= 2025 Muhamet Malo Tournament =

- Host city: Tirana, Albania
- Dates: 26 February-2 March 2025
- Stadium: Tirana Olympic Park

Champions
- Freestyle: Iran
- Greco-Roman: Georgia
- Women: Japan

The 2025 Muhamet Malo Tournament, is a wrestling event will be held in Tirana, Albania between 26 February and 2 March 2025.It will be held as the second of the ranking series of United World Wrestling in 2025. With an aim to reward wrestlers participating in Ranking Series tournaments, the United World Wrestling will award prize money to the medal winners in all weight classes with a total prize money of 390,000 Swiss Francs. The gold medal winners at the four Ranking Series tournaments in 2023 will receive 1500 Swiss Francs with the silver medallists getting 750 Swiss Francs. The two bronze medallists will receive 500 Swiss Francs each.

== Ranking Series ==
Ranking Series Calendar 2025:

- 1st Ranking Series: 5-9 February, Croatia, Zagreb ⇒ 2025 Grand Prix Zagreb Open
- 2nd Ranking Series: 26 February-2 March, Tirana, Albania ⇒ 2025 Muhamet Malo Tournament
- 3rd Ranking Series: 29 May-1 June, Mongolia, Ulaanbaatar ⇒ 2025 Ulaanbaatar Open
- 4th Ranking Series: 17-20 July, Hungary, Budapest ⇒ 2025 Polyák Imre, Varga János & Kozma István Memorial Tournament

== Competition schedule ==
All times are (UTC+2)

Date	Time	Event
26 February	10.30-15.30	Qualification rounds & repechage FS 57-61-65-70-74-86 kg
26 February	18.00-20.30	Final matches and awarding ceremony: FS 57-61-65-70-74-86 kg
27 February	10.30-15.30	Qualification rounds & repechage FS 79-92-97-125 kg & WW 50-55 kg
27 February	18.00-20.30	Final matches and awarding ceremony: Finals FS 79-92-97-125 kg & WW 50-55 kg
28 February	10.30-15.30	Qualification rounds & repechage WW 59-62-65-68 kg & GR 77-87 kg
28 February	18.00-20.30	Final matches and awarding ceremony: Finals WW 59-62-65-68 kg & GR 77-87 kg
1 March	10.30-15.30	Qualification rounds & repechage WW 53-57-72-76kg & GR 63-67 kg
1 March	18.00-20.30	Final matches and awarding ceremony: Finals WW 53-57-72-76kg & GR 63-67 kg
2 March	10.30-15.30	Qualification rounds & repechage GR 55-60-72-82-97-130 kg
2 March	18.00-20.30	Final matches and awarding ceremony: Finals GR 55-60-72-82-97-130 kg

== Medal table ==
* Host nation (Albania)

Rank	Nation	Gold	Silver	Bronze	Total
1	Japan	10	0	2	12
2	Iran	6	1	3	10
3	Turkey	3	3	1	7
4	Kyrgyzstan	2	3	4	9
5	United States	2	0	8	10
–	United World Wrestling	1	5	6	12
6	Georgia	1	5	2	8
7	Kazakhstan	1	1	6	8
8	China	1	1	3	5
9	Bulgaria	1	1	1	3
10	Albania*	1	0	0	1
10	Canada	1	0	0	1
12	Ukraine	0	2	3	5
13	Moldova	0	2	1	3
14	Hungary	0	1	4	5
15	Romania	0	1	1	2
16	Armenia	0	1	0	1
16	Germany	0	1	0	1
16	Slovakia	0	1	0	1
16	Tajikistan	0	1	0	1
20	North Macedonia	0	0	2	2
21	Austria	0	0	1	1
21	Bahrain	0	0	1	1
21	Ecuador	0	0	1	1
21	Estonia	0	0	1	1
21	Netherlands	0	0	1	1
21	Norway	0	0	1	1
21	Poland	0	0	1	1
21	Serbia	0	0	1	1
21	Sweden	0	0	1	1
Totals (29 entries)		30	30	56	116

== Team ranking ==
Rank	Men's freestyle		Men's Greco-Roman		Women's freestyle	
Rank	Team	Points	Team	Points	Team	Points
1	Iran	135	Georgia	141	Japan	158
2	United States	97	Turkey	137	Ukraine	110
3	Japan	93	Kyrgyzstan	125	United States	109
4	Georgia	89	Iran	88	China	88
5	Kazakhstan	63	Kazakhstan	68	Canada	57
6	Kyrgyzstan	61	Bulgaria	66	Kazakhstan	48
7	Armenia	40	Hungary	52	Turkey	46
8	Slovakia	38	Japan	50	Romania	41
9	North Macedonia	38	China	39	Kyrgyzstan	36
10	Moldova	37	Germany	38	Moldova	34

== Medal overview ==
=== Men's freestyle ===
Event	Gold	Silver	Bronze
57 kg	Ali Momeni; Iran	Aiaal Belolyubskii; Tajikistan	Li Weiyu; China
57 kg	Ali Momeni; Iran	Aiaal Belolyubskii; Tajikistan	Almaz Smanbekov; Kyrgyzstan
61 kg	Takara Suda; Japan	Nachyn Mongush; United World Wrestling	Artem Gobaev; United World Wrestling
61 kg	Takara Suda; Japan	Nachyn Mongush; United World Wrestling	Mukhamed Balgabay; Kazakhstan
65 kg	Rahman Amouzad; Iran	Taiyrbek Zhumashbek Uulu; Kyrgyzstan	Real Woods; United States
65 kg	Rahman Amouzad; Iran	Taiyrbek Zhumashbek Uulu; Kyrgyzstan	Bilol Sharip Uulu; Kyrgyzstan
70 kg	Yoshinosuke Aoyagi; Japan	Vazgen Tevanyan; Armenia	William Lewan; United States
70 kg	Yoshinosuke Aoyagi; Japan	Vazgen Tevanyan; Armenia	Vasile Diacon; Moldova
74 kg	Chermen Valiev; Albania	Tajmuraz Salkazanov; Slovakia	Murad Kuramagomedov; Hungary
74 kg	Chermen Valiev; Albania	Tajmuraz Salkazanov; Slovakia	Younes Emami; Iran
79 kg	Gadzhimurad Alikhmaev; United World Wrestling	Vladimeri Gamkrelidze; Georgia	Khidir Saipudinov; Bahrain
79 kg	Gadzhimurad Alikhmaev; United World Wrestling	Vladimeri Gamkrelidze; Georgia	Ahmad Magomedov; North Macedonia
86 kg	Chance Marsteller; United States	Bolat Sakayev; Kazakhstan	Rustem Myrzagaliyev; Kazakhstan
86 kg	Chance Marsteller; United States	Bolat Sakayev; Kazakhstan	Tariel Gaphrindashvili; Georgia
92 kg	Kamran Ghasempour; Iran	Alan Bagaev; United World Wrestling	Michael Macchiavello; United States
92 kg	Kamran Ghasempour; Iran	Alan Bagaev; United World Wrestling	Feyzullah Aktürk; Turkey
97 kg	Arash Yoshida; Japan	Erfan Alizadeh; Iran	Kyle Snyder; United States
97 kg	Arash Yoshida; Japan	Erfan Alizadeh; Iran	Magomedgaji Nurov; North Macedonia
125 kg	Amir Hossein Zare; Iran	Zelimkhan Khizriev; United World Wrestling	Dzianis Khramiankou; United World Wrestling
125 kg	Amir Hossein Zare; Iran	Zelimkhan Khizriev; United World Wrestling	Kamil Kościółek; Poland

=== Men's Greco-Roman ===
Event	Gold	Silver	Bronze
55 kg	Emre Mutlu; Turkey	Vakhtang Lolua; Georgia	Yersin Abyir; Kazakhstan
55 kg	Emre Mutlu; Turkey	Vakhtang Lolua; Georgia	Yerassyl Mamyrbekov; Kazakhstan
60 kg	Yu Shiotani; Japan	Amiran Shavadze; Georgia	Ali Ahmadi Vafa; Iran
60 kg	Yu Shiotani; Japan	Amiran Shavadze; Georgia	Tan Haodong; China
63 kg	Kerem Kamal; Turkey	Doolotbek Choibekov; Kyrgyzstan	Mehdi Mohsennejad; Iran
63 kg	Kerem Kamal; Turkey	Doolotbek Choibekov; Kyrgyzstan	Baiaman Apilov; Kyrgyzstan
67 kg	Razzak Beishekeev; Kyrgyzstan	Valentin Petic; Moldova	Joni Khetsuriani; Georgia
67 kg	Razzak Beishekeev; Kyrgyzstan	Valentin Petic; Moldova	Bagdat Sabaz; Kazakhstan
72 kg	Iuri Lomadze; Georgia	Mehmet Mustafa Şahin; Turkey	Yryskeldi Khamzaev; Kyrgyzstan
72 kg	Iuri Lomadze; Georgia	Mehmet Mustafa Şahin; Turkey	Ali Arsalan; Serbia
77 kg	Yryskeldi Maksatbek Uulu; Kyrgyzstan	Idris Ibaev; Germany	Kodai Sakuraba; Japan
77 kg	Yryskeldi Maksatbek Uulu; Kyrgyzstan	Idris Ibaev; Germany	Albin Olofsson; Sweden
82 kg	Burhan Akbudak; Turkey	Gela Bolkvadze; Georgia	Svetoslav Nikolov; Bulgaria
82 kg	Burhan Akbudak; Turkey	Gela Bolkvadze; Georgia	Erik Szilvássy; Hungary
87 kg	Alireza Mohmadi; Iran	Dávid Losonczi; Hungary	Marcel Sterkenburg; Netherlands
87 kg	Alireza Mohmadi; Iran	Dávid Losonczi; Hungary	Tamás Lévai; Hungary
97 kg	Kiril Milov; Bulgaria	Giorgi Melia; Georgia	Markus Ragginger; Austria
97 kg	Kiril Milov; Bulgaria	Giorgi Melia; Georgia	Alex Szőke; Hungary
130 kg	Amin Mirzazadeh; Iran	Hamza Bakır; Turkey	Heiki Nabi; Estonia
130 kg	Amin Mirzazadeh; Iran	Hamza Bakır; Turkey	Yuta Nara; Japan

=== Women's freestyle ===
Event	Gold	Silver	Bronze
50 kg	Umi Ito; Japan	Oksana Livach; Ukraine	Erin Golston; United States
50 kg	Umi Ito; Japan	Oksana Livach; Ukraine	Nadezhda Sokolova; United World Wrestling
53 kg	Moe Kiyooka; Japan	Andreea Ana; Romania	Li Yuxuan; China
53 kg	Moe Kiyooka; Japan	Andreea Ana; Romania	Natalia Malysheva; United World Wrestling
55 kg	Haruna Murayama; Japan	Olga Khoroshavtseva; United World Wrestling	Ekaterina Verbina; United World Wrestling
55 kg	Haruna Murayama; Japan	Olga Khoroshavtseva; United World Wrestling	Oleksandra Khomenets; Ukraine
57 kg	Samantha Stewart; Canada	Elvira Süleyman Kamaloğlu; Turkey	Amanda Martinez; United States
57 kg	Samantha Stewart; Canada	Elvira Süleyman Kamaloğlu; Turkey	Luisa Valverde; Ecuador
59 kg	Sakura Onishi; Japan	Anastasiia Sidelnikova; United World Wrestling	Solomiia Vynnyk; Ukraine
62 kg	Lili; China	Bilyana Dudova; Bulgaria	Adaugo Nwachukwu; United States
62 kg	Lili; China	Bilyana Dudova; Bulgaria	Grace Bullen; Norway
65 kg	Miwa Morikawa; Japan	Irina Rîngaci; Moldova	Iryna Koliadenko; Ukraine
68 kg	Ami Ishii; Japan	Li Zelu; China	Elizaveta Petliakova; United World Wrestling
68 kg	Ami Ishii; Japan	Li Zelu; China	Kateryna Zelenykh; Romania
72 kg	Zhamila Bakbergenova; Kazakhstan	Alla Belinska; Ukraine	Alexandria Glaudé; United States
76 kg	Dymond Guilford; United States	Aiperi Medet Kyzy; Kyrgyzstan	Elmira Syzdykova; Kazakhstan
76 kg	Dymond Guilford; United States	Aiperi Medet Kyzy; Kyrgyzstan	Anastasiya Alpyeyeva; Ukraine

== Participating nations ==
423 wrestlers from 42 countries:

1. Albania (18) (Host)
2. Argentina (5)
3. Armenia (6)
4. Austria (1)
5. Brazil (3)
6. Bahrain (3)
7. Bulgaria (17)
8. Canada (5)
9. China (42)
10. Croatia (4)
11. Denmark (2)
12. Ecuador (1)
13. Spain (2)
14. Estonia (1)
15. Finland (3)
16. Georgia (32)
17. Germany (7)
18. Hungary (16)
19. Iran (14)
20. Italy (4)
21. Japan (21)
22. Kazakhstan (46)
23. Kyrgyzstan (32)
24. Latvia (1)
25. Lithuania (2)
26. Moldova (7)
27. North Macedonia (3)
28. Netherlands (2)
29. Norway (7)
30. Poland (3)
31. Puerto Rico (1)
32. Qatar (1)
33. Romania (11)
34. Sierra Leone (1)
35. Serbia (4)
36. Switzerland (7)
37. Sweden (5)
38. Slovakia (3)
39. Tajikistan (2)
40. Turkey (20)
41. Ukraine (13)
42. United States (21)
43. United World Wrestling (19)

== Results ==
=== Men's freestyle ===
==== Men's freestyle 57 kg ====
Round of 16
Liu Jianhao (CHN)	1
Thomas Epp (SUI)	5
Li Weiyu (CHN)	10
Liao Hongzhu (CHN)	3
Aiaal Belolyubskii (TJK)	4
Roberti Dingashvili (GEO)	1
Almaz Smanbekov (KGZ)	4
Abdumalik Karachov (KGZ)	1
Kento Yumiya (JPN)	11
Manvel Khndzrtsyan (ARM)	14
Ali Momeni (IRI)	7
Hadi Rezaei (IRI)	3

Quarterfinals
Sultan Kurmanaliyev (KAZ)	2
Thomas Epp (SUI)	1
Li Weiyu (CHN)	1
Aiaal Belolyubskii (TJK)	8
Almaz Smanbekov (KGZ)	10
Manvel Khndzrtsyan (ARM)	0
Ali Momeni (IRI)	4
Merey Bazarbayev (KAZ)	1

Semifinals
Sultan Kurmanaliyev (KAZ)	4
Aiaal Belolyubskii (TJK)	10
Almaz Smanbekov (KGZ)	2
Ali Momeni (IRI)	6

Final
Aiaal Belolyubskii (TJK)	2
Ali Momeni (IRI)	5^{F}

Repechage round 1
Roberti Dingashvili (GEO)	0
Li Weiyu (CHN)	6
Hadi Rezaei (IRI)	1
Merey Bazarbayev (KAZ)	5

Bronze medal match
Li Weiyu (CHN)	9
Sultan Kurmanaliyev (KAZ)	9
Merey Bazarbayev (KAZ)	2
Almaz Smanbekov (KGZ)	3

==== Men's freestyle 61 kg ====
Round of 16
Bekzat Almaz Uulu (KGZ)	3
Bekbolot Myrzanazar Uulu (KGZ)	0
Artem Gobaev (UWW)	4
Meirambek Kartbay (KAZ)	0
Leonid Colesnic (MDA)	8
Dzmitry Shamela (UWW)	4
Takara Suda (JPN)	11
Giorgi Goniashvili (GEO)	0
Mukhamed Balgabay (KAZ)	0
Nachyn Mongush (UWW)	4
Daviti Abdaladze (GEO)	8
Wang Chengtao (CHN)	0
Shynggyskhan Zhantassuly (KAZ)	1
Stilyan Iliev (BUL)	4
Nils Leutert (SUI)	4
Hu Shengjie (CHN)	8

Quarterfinals
Bekzat Almaz Uulu (KGZ)	0
Artem Gobaev (UWW)	7^{F}
Leonid Colesnic (MDA)	1
Takara Suda (JPN)	3
Nachyn Mongush (UWW)	11
Daviti Abdaladze (GEO)	0
Stilyan Iliev (BUL)	8^{F}
Hu Shengjie (CHN)	6

Semifinals
Artem Gobaev (UWW)	2
Takara Suda (JPN)	9
Nachyn Mongush (UWW)	7^{F}
Stilyan Iliev (BUL)	1

Final
Takara Suda (JPN)	8
Nachyn Mongush (UWW)	8

Repechage round 1
Giorgi Goniashvili (GEO)	7
Leonid Colesnic (MDA)	7
Mukhamed Balgabay (KAZ)	6^{F}
Daviti Abdaladze (GEO)	4

Bronze medal match
Leonid Colesnic (MDA)	0
Artem Gobaev (UWW)	3
Mukhamed Balgabay (KAZ)	7
Stilyan Iliev (BUL)	0

==== Men's freestyle 65 kg ====
Final
Rahman Amouzad (IRI)	5
Taiyrbek Zhumashbek Uulu (KGZ)	1

Round of 32
Nursultan Sadyk (KAZ)	0
Rahman Amouzad (IRI)	7
Adlan Askarov (KAZ)	8
Agustín Destribats (ARG)	7
Xie Congbao (CHN)	1
Real Woods (USA)	10

Round of 16
Adilkhan Albaiuly (KAZ)	0
Kaiji Ogino (JPN)	2
Rahman Amouzad (IRI)	13
Goderdzi Dzebisashvili (GEO)	0
Cavit Acar (TUR)	5
Adlan Askarov (KAZ)	8
Real Woods (USA)	10
Mikyay Naim (BUL)	0

Quarterfinals
Kaiji Ogino (JPN)	0
Rahman Amouzad (IRI)	4
Adlan Askarov (KAZ)	0
Real Woods (USA)	10

Semifinals
Rahman Amouzad (IRI)	11
Real Woods (USA)	2

Round of 32
Bilol Sharip Uulu (KGZ)	12
Dmytro Mykhniuk (UKR)	3
Klevis Preçi (ALB)	0
Islam Dudaev (ALB)	12

Round of 16
Taiyrbek Zhumashbek Uulu (KGZ)	7
Chen Shuang (CHN)	1
Bilol Sharip Uulu (KGZ)	14
Ibragim Ibragimov (UWW)	4
Kaisei Tanabe (JPN)	10
Islam Dudaev (ALB)	8
Kamol Begakov (TJK)	2
Sergiu Lupașco (MDA)	10

Quarterfinals
Taiyrbek Zhumashbek Uulu (KGZ)	4
Bilol Sharip Uulu (KGZ)	2
Kaisei Tanabe (JPN)	10
Sergiu Lupașco (MDA)	0

Semifinals
Taiyrbek Zhumashbek Uulu (KGZ)	14
Kaisei Tanabe (JPN)	3

Repechage round 1
Nursultan Sadyk (KAZ)	8
Goderdzi Dzebisashvili (GEO)	1

Repechage round 2
Nursultan Sadyk (KAZ)	2
Kaiji Ogino (JPN)	11
Chen Shuang (CHN)	0
Bilol Sharip Uulu (KGZ)	10

Bronze medals
Kaiji Ogino (JPN)	1
Real Woods (USA)	9
Bilol Sharip Uulu (KGZ)	3
Kaisei Tanabe (JPN)	1

==== Men's freestyle 70 kg ====
Round of 16
Arman Andreasyan (ARM)
Yoshinosuke Aoyagi (JPN)	WO
Eriglent Prizreni (ALB)	0^{R}
William Lewan (USA)	9
Wei Tao (CHN)	2
Fati Vejseli (MKD)	10
James Green (USA)	4
Sanzhar Doszhanov (KAZ)	2
Mihail Georgiev (BUL)	0
Vazgen Tevanyan (ARM)	4
Nachyn Kuular (KAZ)	0
Vasile Diacon (MDA)	11
Omurbek Taalaibek Uulu (KGZ)	2
Akaki Kemertelidze (GEO)	6
Yahya Thomas (USA)	5
Yernur Nurgazy (KAZ)	1

Quarterfinals
Yoshinosuke Aoyagi (JPN)	11
William Lewan (USA)	1
Fati Vejseli (MKD)	0
James Green (USA)	4
Vazgen Tevanyan (ARM)	3
Vasile Diacon (MDA)	2
Akaki Kemertelidze (GEO)	3
Yahya Thomas (USA)	0

Semifinals
Yoshinosuke Aoyagi (JPN)	4
James Green (USA)	1
Vazgen Tevanyan (ARM)	6
Akaki Kemertelidze (GEO)	0

Final
Yoshinosuke Aoyagi (JPN)	4
Vazgen Tevanyan (ARM)	1

Repechage round 1
Arman Andreasyan (ARM)
William Lewan (USA)	WO
Mihail Georgiev (BUL)	0
Vasile Diacon (MDA)	10

Bronze medal match
William Lewan (USA)	4
James Green (USA)	3
Vasile Diacon (MDA)	10
Akaki Kemertelidze (GEO)	0

==== Men's freestyle 74 kg ====
Final
Tajmuraz Salkazanov (SVK)	0
Chermen Valiev (ALB)	2

Round of 32
Murad Kuramagomedov (HUN)	1
Tajmuraz Salkazanov (SVK)	2

Round of 16
Magomedrasul Asluev (BRN)	1
Giorgi Elbakidze (GEO)	6
Tajmuraz Salkazanov (SVK)	5
Ramazan Ramazanov (BUL)	0
Wang Ning (CHN)	0
Hikaru Takata (JPN)	12
Alibek Abdikassymov (KAZ)	0
Magoma Dibirgadzhiev (UWW)	10

Quarterfinals
Giorgi Elbakidze (GEO)	0
Tajmuraz Salkazanov (SVK)	5
Hikaru Takata (JPN)	1
Magoma Dibirgadzhiev (UWW)	8

Semifinals
Tajmuraz Salkazanov (SVK)	5
Magoma Dibirgadzhiev (UWW)	0

Round of 32
Mohammad Mottaghinia (ESP)	2
Narek Harutyunyan (ARM)	4

Round of 16
Younes Emami (IRI)	10
Shen Tao (CHN)	0
Otari Bagauri (GEO)	12
Iakub Shikhdzamalov (ROU)	2
Chermen Valiev (ALB)	9
Narek Harutyunyan (ARM)	0
Orozobek Toktomambetov (KGZ)	4
Quincy Monday (USA)	2

Quarterfinals
Younes Emami (IRI)	10
Otari Bagauri (GEO)	2
Chermen Valiev (ALB)	5
Orozobek Toktomambetov (KGZ)	1

Semifinals
Younes Emami (IRI)	3
Chermen Valiev (ALB)	8

Repechage round 1
Murad Kuramagomedov (HUN)	3
Ramazan Ramazanov (BUL)	0

Repechage round 2
Murad Kuramagomedov (HUN)	8^{F}
Giorgi Elbakidze (GEO)	3
Narek Harutyunyan (ARM)	1
Orozobek Toktomambetov (KGZ)	4

Bronze medals
Murad Kuramagomedov (HUN)	1
Magoma Dibirgadzhiev (UWW)	1
Orozobek Toktomambetov (KGZ)	1
Younes Emami (IRI)	6

==== Men's freestyle 79 kg ====
Round of 16
Hayk Papikyan (ARM)	2
Vladimeri Gamkrelidze (GEO)	9
Ion Laurențiu Marcu (MDA)	7
Shane Jones (PUR)	7
David McFadden (USA)	11^{F}
Petar Petkov (BUL)	0
Tornike Tulashvili (GEO)	0
Khidir Saipudinov (BRN)	10
Cao Nan (CHN)	9^{F}
Alfred Daniel (SLE)	0
Evan Wick (USA)	8
Ryunosuke Kamiya (JPN)	0
Orges Lila (ALB)	0
Gadzhimurad Alikhmaev (UWW)	10
Ahmad Magomedov (MKD)	9
Daulet Yergesh (KAZ)	5

Quarterfinals
Vladimeri Gamkrelidze (GEO)	WO
Ion Laurențiu Marcu (MDA)
David McFadden (USA)	5
Khidir Saipudinov (BRN)	11
Cao Nan (CHN)	0
Evan Wick (USA)	7
Gadzhimurad Alikhmaev (UWW)	5
Ahmad Magomedov (MKD)	2

Semifinals
Vladimeri Gamkrelidze (GEO)	5
Khidir Saipudinov (BRN)	3
Evan Wick (USA)
Gadzhimurad Alikhmaev (UWW)	WO

Final
Vladimeri Gamkrelidze (GEO)	1
Gadzhimurad Alikhmaev (UWW)	4

Repechage round 1
Hayk Papikyan (ARM)	WO
Ion Laurențiu Marcu (MDA)
Orges Lila (ALB)
Ahmad Magomedov (MKD)	WO

Bronze medal match
Hayk Papikyan (ARM)	2
Khidir Saipudinov (BRN)	5
Ahmad Magomedov (MKD)	WO
Evan Wick (USA)

==== Men's freestyle 86 kg ====
Round of 16
Rustem Myrzagaliyev (KAZ)	6
Jorge Llano (ARG)	1
Sebastian Jezierzański (POL)	12
Bekzat Rakhimov (KGZ)	6
Chen Hui (CHN)	5
Tamaz Nikoleishvili (GEO)	8
Daniyar Kaisanov (KAZ)	0
Bolat Sakayev (KAZ)	5

Quarterfinals
Chance Marsteller (USA)	8^{F}
Rustem Myrzagaliyev (KAZ)	0
Sebastian Jezierzański (POL)	WO
Taimuraz Friev (ESP)
Tariel Gaphrindashvili (GEO)	11
Tamaz Nikoleishvili (GEO)	0
Bolat Sakayev (KAZ)	6
Mukhammad Abdullaev (KGZ)	1

Semifinals
Chance Marsteller (USA)	4
Sebastian Jezierzański (POL)	0
Tariel Gaphrindashvili (GEO)	4
Bolat Sakayev (KAZ)	4

Final
Chance Marsteller (USA)	2
Bolat Sakayev (KAZ)	0

Repechage round 1
Daniyar Kaisanov (KAZ)	1
Mukhammad Abdullaev (KGZ)	11

Bronze medal match
Rustem Myrzagaliyev (KAZ)	8
Sebastian Jezierzański (POL)	1
Mukhammad Abdullaev (KGZ)	8
Tariel Gaphrindashvili (GEO)	4^{F}

==== Men's freestyle 92 kg ====
Round of 16
Michael Macchiavello (USA)	10
Nurdaulet Bekenov (KAZ)	0
Akhmed Bataev (BUL)	10^{F}
Teimuraz Kochkiani (GEO)	0
Yaraslau Iadkouski (UWW)	0
Miriani Maisuradze (GEO)	7
Samuel Scherrer (SUI)	1
Feyzullah Aktürk (TUR)	8

Quarterfinals
Narenmanduhai (CHN)	0
Michael Macchiavello (USA)	9
Akhmed Bataev (BUL)	2
Alan Bagaev (UWW)	5
Kamran Ghasempour (IRI)	8
Miriani Maisuradze (GEO)	0
Feyzullah Aktürk (TUR)	7
Boris Makoev (SVK)	5

Semifinals
Michael Macchiavello (USA)	0
Alan Bagaev (UWW)	8
Kamran Ghasempour (IRI)	10
Feyzullah Aktürk (TUR)	0

Final
Alan Bagaev (UWW)	0
Kamran Ghasempour (IRI)	10

Bronze medals
Akhmed Bataev (BUL)	1
Michael Macchiavello (USA)	3
Miriani Maisuradze (GEO)
Feyzullah Aktürk (TUR)	WO

==== Men's freestyle 97 kg ====
Round of 16
Aliaksandr Hushtyn (UWW)	WO
Radosław Baran (POL)
Mojtaba Goleij (IRI)	2
Kyle Snyder (USA)	3
Arash Yoshida (JPN)	10^{F}
Gurgen Simonyan (ARM)	0
Dato Piruzashvili (GEO)	4
Vladislav Baitcaev (HUN)	0
Erfan Alizadeh (IRI)	9
Magomedgaji Nurov (MKD)	1
Richárd Végh (HUN)	3
Bekzat Urkimbay (KAZ)	2
Ricardo Báez (ARG)	4
Radu Lefter (MDA)	15
Batyrbek Tsakulov (SVK)	3
Habila Awusayiman (CHN)	2

Quarterfinals
Aliaksandr Hushtyn (UWW)	0
Kyle Snyder (USA)	3
Arash Yoshida (JPN)	11
Dato Piruzashvili (GEO)	1
Erfan Alizadeh (IRI)	7
Richárd Végh (HUN)	0
Radu Lefter (MDA)	0
Batyrbek Tsakulov (SVK)	10

Semifinals
Kyle Snyder (USA)	5
Arash Yoshida (JPN)	5
Erfan Alizadeh (IRI)	3
Batyrbek Tsakulov (SVK)	2

Final
Arash Yoshida (JPN)	3
Erfan Alizadeh (IRI)	2

Repechage round 1
Gurgen Simonyan (ARM)	0
Dato Piruzashvili (GEO)	3
Magomedgaji Nurov (MKD)	12
Richárd Végh (HUN)	10

Bronze medal match
Dato Piruzashvili (GEO)	0
Kyle Snyder (USA)	11
Magomedgaji Nurov (MKD)	4
Batyrbek Tsakulov (SVK)	0

==== Men's freestyle 125 kg ====
Round of 16
Jordan Wood (USA)	2
Shamil Sharipov (BRN)	4
Dzianis Khramiankou (UWW)	0
Amir Hossein Zare (IRI)	7
Solomon Manashvili (GEO)	4
Omar Sarem (ROU)	0
Nursultan Azov (KAZ)	0
Hakan Büyükçıngıl (TUR)	4
Givi Matcharashvili (GEO)	7
Omarkhan Nadirov (KAZ)	1
Gabriel Silva (BRA)	2
Omar Eyubov (KAZ)	11
Buheeerdun (CHN)	2
Kamil Kościółek (POL)	4
Demetrius Thomas (USA)	4
Zelimkhan Khizriev (UWW)	16

Quarterfinals
Shamil Sharipov (BRN)	0
Amir Hossein Zare (IRI)	3
Solomon Manashvili (GEO)	3
Hakan Büyükçıngıl (TUR)	7
Givi Matcharashvili (GEO)	3
Omar Eyubov (KAZ)	0
Kamil Kościółek (POL)	6
Zelimkhan Khizriev (UWW)	7^{F}

Semifinals
Amir Hossein Zare (IRI)	3
Hakan Büyükçıngıl (TUR)	0
Givi Matcharashvili (GEO)	4
Zelimkhan Khizriev (UWW)	7

Final
Amir Hossein Zare (IRI)	10
Zelimkhan Khizriev (UWW)	0

Repechage round 1
Dzianis Khramiankou (UWW)	2
Shamil Sharipov (BRN)	2
Demetrius Thomas (USA)	0
Kamil Kościółek (POL)	10

Bronze medal match
Dzianis Khramiankou (UWW)	8
Hakan Büyükçıngıl (TUR)	6^{R}
Kamil Kościółek (POL)	3
Givi Matcharashvili (GEO)	1

=== Men's Greco-Roman ===
==== Men's Greco-Roman 55 kg ====
Round of 16
Yersin Abyir (KAZ)	8
Bajram Sina (ALB)	0

Quarterfinals
Artiom Deleanu (MDA)	1
Yersin Abyir (KAZ)	3
Vakhtang Lolua (GEO)	4
Ulan Muratbek Uulu (KGZ)	2
Emre Mutlu (TUR)	9^{F}
Andi Muça (ALB)	0
Nurbolot Berdikulov (KGZ)	2
Yerassyl Mamyrbekov (KAZ)	10

Semifinals
Yersin Abyir (KAZ)	4
Vakhtang Lolua (GEO)	6
Emre Mutlu (TUR)	8
Yerassyl Mamyrbekov (KAZ)	5

Final
Vakhtang Lolua (GEO)	4
Emre Mutlu (TUR)	7

Bronze medals
Ulan Muratbek Uulu (KGZ)	1
Yersin Abyir (KAZ)	9^{F}
Andi Muça (ALB)	0
Yerassyl Mamyrbekov (KAZ)	9

==== Men's Greco-Roman 60 kg ====
Round of 32
	Score	
Yu Shiotani (JPN)	12–6 Fall	Ali Ahmadi Vafa (IRI)

Round of 16
Xi Ziyue (CHN)	5
~~Victor Ciobanu (MDA)~~	1
Yu Shiotani (JPN)	11
Ergi Uku (ALB)	0
Akyl Sulaimanov (KGZ)	3
Pridon Abuladze (GEO)	2
Hu Yunlong (CHN)	9
Marat Garipov (BRA)	0
Amiran Shavadze (GEO)	4^{F}
Ishkar Kurbayev (KAZ)	3
Ekrem Öztürk (TUR)	9
Denis Mihai (ROU)	0
Tan Haodong (CHN)	8^{F}
Enes Başar (TUR)	2
Nedyalko Petrov (BUL)	3
Amangali Bekbolatov (KAZ)	6

Quarterfinals
Xi Ziyue (CHN)	0
Yu Shiotani (JPN)	11
Akyl Sulaimanov (KGZ)	9
Hu Yunlong (CHN)	0
Amiran Shavadze (GEO)	9
Ekrem Öztürk (TUR)	0
Tan Haodong (CHN)	3
Amangali Bekbolatov (KAZ)	1

Semifinals
Yu Shiotani (JPN)	10
Akyl Sulaimanov (KGZ)	0
Amiran Shavadze (GEO)	8
Tan Haodong (CHN)	0

Final
Yu Shiotani (JPN)	9
Amiran Shavadze (GEO)	0

Repechage round 1
Ali Ahmadi Vafa (IRI)	10
Ergi Uku (ALB)	0

Repechage round 2
Ali Ahmadi Vafa (IRI)	11
Xi Ziyue (CHN)	2
Ishkar Kurbayev (KAZ)	WO
Ekrem Öztürk (TUR)

Bronze medals
Ali Ahmadi Vafa (IRI)	12
Akyl Sulaimanov (KGZ)	3
Ishkar Kurbayev (KAZ)	0
Tan Haodong (CHN)	9

==== Men's Greco-Roman 63 kg ====
Round of 16
Nurzat Marat (KAZ)	2
Kerem Kamal (TUR)	5
Beka Guruli (GEO)	6
Baiaman Apilov (KGZ)	7
Nursultan Bazarbayev (KAZ)	0
Dastan Kadyrov (KGZ)	10

Quarterfinals
Mehdi Mohsennejad (IRI)	1
Kerem Kamal (TUR)	5
~~Răzvan Arnăut (ROU)~~	5
Olzhas Sultan (KAZ)	1
Doolotbek Choibekov (KGZ)	3
Baiaman Apilov (KGZ)	1
Dastan Kadyrov (KGZ)	5
Aleksandrs Jurkjans (LAT)	6

Semifinals
Kerem Kamal (TUR)	5
~~Răzvan Arnăut (ROU)~~	1
Doolotbek Choibekov (KGZ)	9
Aleksandrs Jurkjans (LAT)	3

Final
Kerem Kamal (TUR)	10
Doolotbek Choibekov (KGZ)	0

Repechage round 1
Nurzat Marat (KAZ)	0
Mehdi Mohsennejad (IRI)	8

Bronze medal match
Mehdi Mohsennejad (IRI)	3
~~Răzvan Arnăut (ROU)~~	1
Baiaman Apilov (KGZ)	WO
Aleksandrs Jurkjans (LAT)

==== Men's Greco-Roman 67 kg ====
Final
Razzak Beishekeev (KGZ)	11
Valentin Petic (MDA)	0

Round of 32
Xie Dongfu (CHN)	3
Gjete Prenga (ALB)	6

Round of 16
Joni Khetsuriani (GEO)	4
Leri Abuladze (GEO)	1
Gjete Prenga (ALB)	0
Abu Muslim Amaev (BUL)	9
Murat Fırat (TUR)	2
Razzak Beishekeev (KGZ)	7
Ardit Zeneli (ALB)	2
Madiyar Maulitkanov (KAZ)	11

Quarterfinals
Joni Khetsuriani (GEO)	7
Abu Muslim Amaev (BUL)	1
Razzak Beishekeev (KGZ)	4
Madiyar Maulitkanov (KAZ)	0

Semifinals
Joni Khetsuriani (GEO)	2
Razzak Beishekeev (KGZ)	6

Round of 32
Haruto Yabe (JPN)	3
Baiaman Karimov (KGZ)	6
Morten Thoresen (NOR)	5
Sebastian Nađ (SRB)	0

Round of 16
Bagdat Sabaz (KAZ)	5
Andreas Vetsch (SUI)	3
Balaman Karimov (KGZ)	1
Niklas Öhlén (SWE)	1
Valentin Petic (MDA)	6
Morten Thoresen (NOR)	1
Abylaikhan Amzeyev (KAZ)	4
Li Lei (CHN)	6

Quarterfinals
Bagdat Sabaz (KAZ)	7^{F}
Balaman Karimov (KGZ)	3
Valentin Petic (MDA)	4^{F}
Li Lei (CHN)	9

Semifinals
Bagdat Sabaz (KAZ)	8
Valentin Petic (MDA)	14

Repechage round 2
Murat Fırat (TUR)
Madiyar Maulitkanov (KAZ)	WO
Morten Thoresen (NOR)
Li Lei (CHN)	WO

Bronze medal match
Madiyar Maulitkanov (KAZ)	2
Joni Khetsuriani (GEO)	7
Li Lei (CHN)	1
Bagdat Sabaz (KAZ)	9

==== Men's Greco-Roman 72 kg ====
Round of 32
	Score	
Selçuk Can (TUR)	7–3	Mikko Peltokangas (FIN)
Levente Lévai (HUN)	4–4	Ali Arsalan (SRB)

Round of 16
Michael Portmann (SUI)	3
Lars Letvik (NOR)	7
Selçuk Can (TUR)	5
Yryskeldi Khamzaev (KGZ)	5
Ivo Iliev (BUL)	1
Mehmet Mustafa Şahin (TUR)	2
Xhorxh Frrokaj (ALB)	0
Nikolay Khapko (KAZ)	8
Emiljano Tafa (ALB)	0
Otar Abuladze (GEO)	8
Sajjad Imentalab (IRI)	6
István Váncza (HUN)	9
Iuri Lomadze (GEO)	5
Ali Arsalan (SRB)	1
Leng Ji (CHN)	2
Kristupas Šleiva (LTU)	4

Quarterfinals
Lars Letvik (NOR)	3
Yryskeldi Khamzaev (KGZ)	9
Mehmet Mustafa Şahin (TUR)	3
Nikolay Khapko (KAZ)	1
Otar Abuladze (GEO)	7
István Váncza (HUN)	1
Iuri Lomadze (GEO)	13
Kristupas Šleiva (LTU)	2

Semifinals
Yryskeldi Khamzaev (KGZ)	0
Mehmet Mustafa Şahin (TUR)	9
Otar Abuladze (GEO)	3
Iuri Lomadze (GEO)	6

Final
Mehmet Mustafa Şahin (TUR)	3
Iuri Lomadze (GEO)	8

Repechage round 2
Ivo Iliev (BUL)	9
Nikolay Khapko (KAZ)	0
Ali Arsalan (SRB)	9
Kristupas Šleiva (LTU)	0

Bronze medal match
Ivo Iliev (BUL)	0
Yryskeldi Khamzaev (KGZ)	9
Ali Arsalan (SRB)	4
Otar Abuladze (GEO)	3

==== Men's Greco-Roman 77 kg ====
Final
Idris Ibaev (GER)	2
Yryskeldi Maksatbek Uulu (KGZ)	3

Round of 32
Artur Politaiev (UKR)	9
Huang Yuhe (CHN)	0
Iznovr Abayev (KAZ)
Albert Doev (BUL)	WO
Shi Likui (CHN)	1
Aleksa Ilić (SRB)	6

Round of 16
Ahmet Yılmaz (TUR)	8
Samuel Bellscheidt (GER)	1
Artur Politaiev (UKR)	3
Kodai Sakuraba (JPN)	3
Idris Ibaev (GER)	8
Albert Doev (BUL)	0
Aleksa Ilić (SRB)	6
Kevin Kupi (ALB)	5

Quarterfinals
Ahmet Yılmaz (TUR)	3
Kodai Sakuraba (JPN)	5
Idris Ibaev (GER)	9^{F}
Aleksa Ilić (SRB)	0

Semifinals
Kodai Sakuraba (JPN)	0
Idris Ibaev (GER)	8

Round of 32
Albin Olofsson (SWE)	8
Oliver Krüger (DEN)	1
Juan Sebastian Aak (NOR)	0
Adilkhan Nurlanbekov (KGZ)	9
Yryskeldi Maksatbek Uulu (KGZ)	5
Antonio Kamenjašević (CRO)	0
Ramaz Zoidze (GEO)	6
Abolfazl Mohmedi (IRI)	7

Round of 16
Yeldos Kamelov (KAZ)	5
Albin Olofsson (SWE)	8
Adilkhan Nurlanbekov (KGZ)	2
Pavel Puklavec (CRO)	3
Wang Zhihuan (CHN)	2
Yryskeldi Maksatbek Uulu (KGZ)	9
Abolfazl Mohmedi (IRI)	11
Klodjan Shehu (ALB)	3

Quarterfinals
Albin Olofsson (SWE)	7^{F}
Pavel Puklavec (CRO)	0
Yryskeldi Maksatbek Uulu (KGZ)	3
Abolfazl Mohmedi (IRI)	0

Semifinals
Albin Olofsson (SWE)	1
Yryskeldi Maksatbek Uulu (KGZ)	6

Repechage round 1
Antonio Kamenjašević (CRO)	3
Wang Zhihuan (CHN)	1

Repechage round 2
Albert Doev (BUL)	1
Aleksa Ilić (SRB)	7
Antonio Kamenjašević (CRO)	5
Abolfazl Mohmedi (IRI)	2

Bronze medals
Aleksa Ilić (SRB)	4
Kodai Sakuraba (JPN)	7
Antonio Kamenjašević (CRO)	3
Albin Olofsson (SWE)	3

==== Men's Greco-Roman 82 kg ====
Final
Burhan Akbudak (TUR)	WO
Gela Bolkvadze (GEO)

Round of 32
Vasile Cojoc (ROU)	1
Bekzat Orunkul Uulu (KGZ)	9

Round of 16
Karlo Kodrić (CRO)	6
Mihail Bradu (MDA)	5
Bekzat Orunkul Uulu (KGZ)	4
Svetoslav Nikolov (BUL)	3^{F}
Beksultan Nazarbaev (KGZ)	2
Burhan Akbudak (TUR)	11
Boris Frrokaj (ALB)	0
Dias Kaltay (KAZ)	8

Quarterfinals
Karlo Kodrić (CRO)	3
Svetoslav Nikolov (BUL)	5
Burhan Akbudak (TUR)	3^{F}
Dias Kaltay (KAZ)	0

Semifinals
Svetoslav Nikolov (BUL)	3
Burhan Akbudak (TUR)	6^{C}

Round of 32
Shahin Badaghi (QAT)	9
Kelsi Nelaj (ALB)	0
~~Olzhas Yergali (KAZ)~~	9
Talas Ashirkhanov (KAZ)	0

Round of 16
Gela Bolkvadze (GEO)	3
Erik Szilvássy (HUN)	2
Shahin Badaghi (QAT)	2
Per-Anders Kure (NOR)	2
Mykyta Politaiev (UKR)	1
~~Olzhas Yergali (KAZ)~~	1
Ramon Betschart (SUI)	4
Emrah Kuş (TUR)	2

Quarterfinals
Gela Bolkvadze (GEO)	6
Shahin Badaghi (QAT)	4
Mykyta Politaiev (UKR)	1
Ramon Betschart (SUI)	5

Semifinals
Gela Bolkvadze (GEO)	2
Ramon Betschart (SUI)	1

Repechage round 2
Beksultan Nazarbaev (KGZ)	3
Dias Kaltay (KAZ)	1
Erik Szilvássy (HUN)	8
Shahin Badaghi (QAT)	0

Bronze medal match
Beksultan Nazarbaev (KGZ)	1
Svetoslav Nikolov (BUL)	10
Erik Szilvássy (HUN)	3
Ramon Betschart (SUI)	2

==== Men's Greco-Roman 87 kg ====
Final
Dávid Losonczi (HUN)
Alireza Mohmadi (IRI)	WO

Round of 32
Dávid Losonczi (HUN)	5^{F}
Patrik Gordan (ROU)	0
Gurami Khetsuriani (GEO)	5
Martin Ljosåk (NOR)	9
Hannes Wagner (GER)	5
Damian von Euw (SUI)	1
Achiko Bolkvadze (GEO)	7
Soh Sakabe (JPN)	1
Luo Jianwen (CHN)	6
Nurzhan Assan (KAZ)	0

Round of 16
Nursultan Tursynov (KAZ)	0
Dávid Losonczi (HUN)	5
Martin Ljosåk (NOR)	2
Hannes Wagner (GER)	11
Marcel Sterkenburg (NED)	7^{F}
Achiko Bolkvadze (GEO)	0
Luo Jianwen (CHN)	1
Azat Salidinov (KGZ)	7

Quarterfinals
Dávid Losonczi (HUN)	5
Hannes Wagner (GER)	0
Marcel Sterkenburg (NED)	3
Azat Salidinov (KGZ)	1

Semifinals
Dávid Losonczi (HUN)	7
Marcel Sterkenburg (NED)	1

Round of 32
Asan Zhanyshov (KGZ)	2
Muhittin Sarıçiçek (TUR)	6
Huang Jiaxin (CHN)	0
Aleksandr Komarov (SRB)	8
Semen Novikov (BUL)	8
Exauce Mukubu (NOR)	3
István Takács (HUN)	3
Ilimdor Satayev (KAZ)	1
Yaroslav Filchakov (UKR)	3
Tamás Lévai (HUN)	4

Round of 16
Ivan Huklek (CRO)	2
Muhittin Sarıçiçek (TUR)	7
Aleksandr Komarov (SRB)	8
Artur Ovsepyan (UKR)	0
Semen Novikov (BUL)	5
István Takács (HUN)	0
Tamás Lévai (HUN)	0
Alireza Mohmadi (IRI)	8

Quarterfinals
Muhittin Sarıçiçek (TUR)	2
Aleksandr Komarov (SRB)	9
Semen Novikov (BUL)	0
Alireza Mohmadi (IRI)	5

Semifinals
Aleksandr Komarov (SRB)	1
Alireza Mohmadi (IRI)	5

Repechage round 1
Patrik Gordan (ROU)	0
Nursultan Tursynov (KAZ)	9

Repechage round 2
Hannes Wagner (GER)	3
Nursultan Tursynov (KAZ)	11
Tamás Lévai (HUN)	1
Semen Novikov (BUL)	1

Bronze medals
Nursultan Tursynov (KAZ)	1
Marcel Sterkenburg (NED)	3
Tamás Lévai (HUN)	3
Aleksandr Komarov (SRB)	1

==== Men's Greco-Roman 97 kg ====
Final
Giorgi Melia (GEO)	0
Kiril Milov (BUL)	4

Round of 32
Mathias Bak (DEN)	1
Giorgi Melia (GEO)	3

Round of 16
Beytullah Kayışdağ (TUR)	4
Yerzat Yerlanov (KAZ)	0
Giorgi Melia (GEO)	9
Nurmanbet Raimaly Uulu (KGZ)	0
Markus Ragginger (AUT)	WO
Giorgi Katsanashvili (GEO)
Aidos Amirov (KAZ)	1
Zhang Youfang (CHN)	3

Quarterfinals
Beytullah Kayışdağ (TUR)	0
Giorgi Melia (GEO)	8
Markus Ragginger (AUT)	8
Zhang Youfang (CHN)	0

Semifinals
Giorgi Melia (GEO)	5
Markus Ragginger (AUT)	2

Round of 16
Takahiro Tsuruda (JPN)	3
Lucas Lazogianis (GER)	4
Alex Szőke (HUN)	7
Arvi Savolainen (FIN)	3

Quarterfinals
Tyrone Sterkenburg (NED)	1
Kiril Milov (BUL)	6
Lucas Lazogianis (GER)	3
Nikoloz Kakhelashvili (ITA)	1
Nicu Ojog (ROU)	1
Alex Szőke (HUN)	9
Zhang Shange (CHN)	5
Melis Aitbekov (KGZ)	5^{F}

Semifinals
Kiril Milov (BUL)	7
Lucas Lazogianis (GER)	0
Alex Szőke (HUN)	8
Melis Aitbekov (KGZ)	0

Final
Kiril Milov (BUL)	5^{F}
Alex Szőke (HUN)	1

Repechage round 1
Mathias Bak (DEN)	7
Nurmanbet Raimaly Uulu (KGZ)	6

Repechage round 2
Mathias Bak (DEN)	0
Beytullah Kayışdağ (TUR)	10
Tyrone Sterkenburg (NED)	0
Lucas Lazogianis (GER)	4

Bronze medals
Beytullah Kayışdağ (TUR)	0
Markus Ragginger (AUT)	8
Lucas Lazogianis (GER)	2
Alex Szőke (HUN)	8

==== Men's Greco-Roman 130 kg ====
Round of 16
Rigers Kurti (ALB)	0
Jiang Wenhao (CHN)	4^{F}
Heiki Nabi (EST)	0
Amin Mirzazadeh (IRI)	4
Saba Chilashvili (GEO)	1
Mantas Knystautas (LTU)	5
Yuta Nara (JPN)	2
Erlan Manatbekov (KGZ)	2
Hamza Bakır (TUR)	8
Bayilaga (CHN)	0
~~Iakobi Kajaia (GEO)~~	WO
Jello Krahmer (GER)
Olzhas Syrlybay (KAZ)	1
Elias Kuosmanen (FIN)	7

Quarterfinals
Dáriusz Vitek (HUN)
Jiang Wenhao (CHN)	WO
Amin Mirzazadeh (IRI)	3
Mantas Knystautas (LTU)	1
Yuta Nara (JPN)	0
Hamza Bakır (TUR)	8
~~Iakobi Kajaia (GEO)~~	3
Elias Kuosmanen (FIN)	1

Semifinals
Jiang Wenhao (CHN)	1
Amin Mirzazadeh (IRI)	3
Hamza Bakır (TUR)	1
~~Iakobi Kajaia (GEO)~~	1

Final
Amin Mirzazadeh (IRI)	3
Hamza Bakır (TUR)	1

Repechage round 1
Heiki Nabi (EST)	1
Mantas Knystautas (LTU)	1
Bayilaga (CHN)	3
Yuta Nara (JPN)	3

Bronze medal match
Heiki Nabi (EST)	2
Jiang Wenhao (CHN)	2
Yuta Nara (JPN)	1
~~Iakobi Kajaia (GEO)~~	4

== See also ==
- 2025 Muhamet Malo Tournament – Women's freestyle
