= 2023 European Wrestling Championships – Men's Greco-Roman 82 kg =

Wrestling competition

Men's Greco-Roman 82 kg at the 2023 European Wrestling Championships
- Venue: Arena Zagreb
- Location: Zagreb, Croatia
- Dates: 22-23 April
- Competitors: 17

Medalists
gold medal	Burhan Akbudak	Turkey
silver medal	Yaroslav Filchakov	Ukraine
bronze medal	Roland Schwarz	Germany
bronze medal	Filip Šačić	Croatia

The Men's Greco-Roman 82 kg is a competition featured at the 2023 European Wrestling Championships, and will held in Zagreb, Croatia on April 22 and 23.

== Results ==
Legend

- F — Won by fall

Round of 32
	Score	
Michael Wagner (AUT)	3–3	Roland Schwarz (GER)

Round of 16
Burhan Akbudak (TUR)	9
Branko Kovačević (SRB)	0
Roland Schwarz (GER)	4
Rosian Dermanski (BUL)	3
Samvel Grigoryan (ARM)	6^{F}
Exauce Mukubu (NOR)	1
Marc Weber (SUI)	0
Rafig Huseynov (AZE)	8
Yaroslav Filchakov (UKR)	4
Zakarias Berg (SWE)	2
Ranet Kaljola (EST)	1
Filip Šačić (CRO)	9
Mihail Bradu (MDA)	15
Georgios Prevolarakis (GRE)	4
Erik Szilvássy (HUN)	1
Gela Bolkvadze (GEO)	10

Quarterfinals
Burhan Akbudak (TUR)	9
Roland Schwarz (GER)	0
Samvel Grigoryan (ARM)	2
Rafig Huseynov (AZE)	3
Yaroslav Filchakov (UKR)	4
Filip Šačić (CRO)	1
Mihail Bradu (MDA)	3
Gela Bolkvadze (GEO)	1

Semifinals
Burhan Akbudak (TUR)	5^{F}
Rafig Huseynov (AZE)	1
Yaroslav Filchakov (UKR)	3
Mihail Bradu (MDA)	1

Final
Burhan Akbudak (TUR)	3
Yaroslav Filchakov (UKR)	3

Repechage round 2
Branko Kovačević (SRB)	0
Roland Schwarz (GER)	6
Zakarias Berg (SWE)	1
Filip Šačić (CRO)	3

Bronze medal match
Roland Schwarz (GER)	2
Rafig Huseynov (AZE)	1
Filip Šačić (CRO)	5
Mihail Bradu (MDA)	4

== Final standing ==
Rank	Athlete
1st place, gold medalist(s)	Burhan Akbudak (TUR)
2nd place, silver medalist(s)	Yaroslav Filchakov (UKR)
3rd place, bronze medalist(s)	Roland Schwarz (GER)
3rd place, bronze medalist(s)	Filip Šačić (CRO)
5	Rafig Huseynov (AZE)
5	Mihail Bradu (MDA)
7	Samvel Grigoryan (ARM)
8	Gela Bolkvadze (GEO)
9	Zakarias Berg (SWE)
10	Georgios Prevolarakis (GRE)
11	Michael Wagner (AUT)
12	Rosian Dermanski (BUL)
13	Ranet Kaljola (EST)
14	Erik Szilvássy (HUN)
15	Exauce Mukubu (NOR)
16	Marc Weber (SUI)
17	Branko Kovačević (SRB)
