= 2023 World Wrestling Championships – Men's Greco-Roman 82 kg =

Wrestling competitions

Men's Greco-Roman 82 kg at the 2023 World Championships
- Venue: Štark Arena
- Dates: 21–22 September 2023
- Competitors: 24 from 21 nations

Medalists
gold medal	Rafig Huseynov	Azerbaijan
silver medal	Alireza Mohmadi	Iran
bronze medal	Aues Gonibov
bronze medal	Yaroslav Filchakov	Ukraine

The men's Greco-Roman 82 kilograms is a competition featured at the 2023 World Wrestling Championships, and was held in Belgrade, Serbia on 21 and 22 September 2023.

This Greco-Roman wrestling competition consists of a single-elimination tournament, with a repechage used to determine the winner of two bronze medals. The two finalists face off for gold and silver medals. Each wrestler who loses to one of the two finalists moves into the repechage, culminating in a pair of bronze medal matches featuring the semifinal losers each facing the remaining repechage opponent from their half of the bracket.

== Results ==
=== Final ===
Final
Rafig Huseynov (AZE)	2
Alireza Mohmadi (IRI)	1

=== Top half ===
Round of 32
Mukhammadkodir Rasulov (UZB)	8
Artem Shapovalov (FIN)	0
Stanislau Shafarenka (AIN)	5
Spencer Woods (USA)	3
Aues Gonibov (AIN)	5
Beksultan Nazarbaev (KGZ)	1
Erik Szilvássy (HUN)	5
Božo Starčević (CRO)	0

Round of 16
Burhan Akbudak (TUR)	5
Mukhammadkodir Rasulov (UZB)	1
Stanislau Shafarenka (AIN)	2
Zakarias Berg (SWE)	7
Dias Kalen (KAZ)	1
Aues Gonibov (AIN)	3
Erik Szilvássy (HUN)	3
Rafig Huseynov (AZE)	4

Quarterfinals
Burhan Akbudak (TUR)	9
Zakarias Berg (SWE)	1
Aues Gonibov (AIN)	5
Rafig Huseynov (AZE)	10

Semifinals
Burhan Akbudak (TUR)	5
Rafig Huseynov (AZE)	5

=== Bottom half ===
Round of 32
Sajan Bhanwal (UWW)	1
Yang Se-jin (KOR)	3
Branko Kovačević (SRB)	7
Shohei Yabiku (JPN)	6
Michael Wagner (AUT)	9
José Andrés Vargas (MEX)	0
Maksim Manukyan (ARM)	6
Idris Ibaev (GER)	9

Round of 16
Yaroslav Filchakov (UKR)	9
Yang Se-jin (KOR)	0
Branko Kovačević (SRB)	0
Alireza Mohmadi (IRI)	8
Mihail Bradu (MDA)	3
Michael Wagner (AUT)	1
Idris Ibaev (GER)	2
Gela Bolkvadze (GEO)	3

Quarterfinals
Yaroslav Filchakov (UKR)	1
Alireza Mohmadi (IRI)	4
Mihail Bradu (MDA)	4
Gela Bolkvadze (GEO)	3

Semifinals
Alireza Mohmadi (IRI)	5
Mihail Bradu (MDA)	1

=== Repechage ===
Repechage round 2
Erik Szilvássy (HUN)	1
Aues Gonibov (AIN)	3
Branko Kovačević (SRB)	0
Yaroslav Filchakov (UKR)	9

Bronze medals
Aues Gonibov (AIN)	6
Burhan Akbudak (TUR)	3
Yaroslav Filchakov (UKR)	1
Mihail Bradu (MDA)	1

== Final standing ==
Rank	Athlete
1st place, gold medalist(s)	Rafig Huseynov (AZE)
2nd place, silver medalist(s)	Alireza Mohmadi (IRI)
3rd place, bronze medalist(s)	Aues Gonibov (AIN)
3rd place, bronze medalist(s)	Yaroslav Filchakov (UKR)
5	Burhan Akbudak (TUR)
5	Mihail Bradu (MDA)
7	Michael Wagner (AUT)
8	Mukhammadkodir Rasulov (UZB)
9	Erik Szilvássy (HUN)
10	Idris Ibaev (GER)
11	Zakarias Berg (SWE)
12	Stanislau Shafarenka (AIN)
13	Gela Bolkvadze (GEO)
14	Branko Kovačević (SRB)
15	Yang Se-jin (KOR)
16	Shohei Yabiku (JPN)
17	Maksim Manukyan (ARM)
18	Spencer Woods (USA)
19	Dias Kalen (KAZ)
20	Sajan Bhanwal (UWW)
21	Beksultan Nazarbaev (KGZ)
22	Božo Starčević (CRO)
23	Artem Shapovalov (FIN)
24	José Andrés Vargas (MEX)
