= Alperen Berber =

Turkish Greco-Roman wrestler

Personal information
- Born: 28 March 2005 (age 21) Samsun, Turkey
- Education: Gümüşhane University
- Height: 1.80 m (5 ft 11 in)
- Weight: 87 kg (192 lb; 13.7 st)

Sport
- Country: Turkey
- Sport: Amateur wrestling
- Weight class: 87 kg
- Event: Greco-Roman
- Club: Ankara ASKI Sports Club
Medal record
Men's Greco-Roman wrestling
Representing Turkey
European Championships
Gold medal – first place	2024 Bucharest	82 kg
Vehbi Emre & Hamit Kaplan Tournament
Bronze medal – third place	2024 Antalya	87 kg
Grand Prix
Silver medal – second place	2023 Bishkek	82 kg
Silver medal – second place	2024 Zagreb	82 kg
World U23 Championships
Silver medal – second place	2023 Tirana	82 kg
Bronze medal – third place	2026 Las Vegas	87 kg
European U23 Championships
Gold medal – first place	2025 Tirana	87 kg
Bronze medal – third place	2026 Zrenjanin	87 kg
World U20 Championships
Gold medal – first place	2023 Amman	82 kg
Silver medal – second place	2024 Pontevedra	82 kg
Bronze medal – third place	2022 Sofia	82 kg
European U20 Championships
Gold medal – first place	2024 Novi Sad	82 kg
Silver medal – second place	2023 Santiago	82 kg
World U17 Championships
Gold medal – first place	2022 Rome	82 kg
European U17 Championships
Silver medal – second place	2021 Samokov	82 kg

Alperen Berber (born 28 March 2005) is a Turkish Greco-Roman wrestler. He won the gold medal at the 2024 European Wrestling Championships.

== Career ==
He became world junior champion in the 2023 World Junior Wrestling Championships held in Amman, Jordan, defeating Iran's Yasin Ali Yazdi 9–1 in the 82 kg final match.

He won the silver medal at the 2023 U23 World Wrestling Championships in Tirana, Albania, losing to independent wrestler Aues Gonibov in the 82 kg final match.

He won the gold medal at the 2024 European Wrestling Championships in Bucharest, Romania, in the men's Greco-Roman style 82 kg, defeating Russia's Islam Aliev 4–3 in the final match. He defeated Azerbaijani Rafig Huseynov 7–1 in the second round, Georgian Gela Bolkvadze 7–1 in the quarterfinals and Aik Mnatsakanian of Bulgaria in the semifinals to reach the final.

Alperen Berber won the gold medal at the European U23 Wrestling Championships held in Tirana, Albania, in the men's Greco-Roman style 82 kg category, drawing 1–1 with Romanian Patrik Gordan in the first round and with the advantage of the last point, defeating Baskhan Saidov of Russia, who competed as an Individual Independent, 4–2 in the quarter-finals, Ivan Chmyr of Ukraine 4–1 in the semi-finals and Vladimeri Karchaidze of France 3–1 in the final match.
