= 2024 European Wrestling Championships – Men's Greco-Roman 82 kg =

Wrestling competition

Men's Greco-Roman 82 kg at the 2024 European Wrestling Championships
- Venue: Polyvalent Hall
- Location: Bucharest, Romania
- Dates: 13-14 February
- Competitors: 20

Medalists
gold medal	Alperen Berber	Turkey
silver medal	Islam Aliev	Individual Neutral Athletes
bronze medal	Gela Bolkvadze	Georgia
bronze medal	Yaroslav Filchakov	Ukraine

The Men's Greco-Roman 82 kg is a competition featured at the 2024 European Wrestling Championships, and was held in Bucharest, Romania on February 13 and 14.

== Results ==
Legend

- F — Won by fall

=== Final ===
Final
Alperen Berber (TUR)	4
Islam Aliev (AIN)	3

=== Top half ===
Round of 32
Vladimeri Karchaidze (FRA)	3
Gela Bolkvadze (GEO)	6
Vasile Cojoc (ROU)	3
Aik Mnatsakanian (BUL)	3

Round of 16
Rafig Huseynov (AZE)	1
Alperen Berber (TUR)	7
Gela Bolkvadze (GEO)	5
Kelsi Nelaj (ALB)	1
Alexandru Solovei (MDA)	5
Aik Mnatsakanian (BUL)	6
Adam Gardzioła (POL)	9
Michael Wagner (AUT)	5

Quarterfinals
Alperen Berber (TUR)	7
Gela Bolkvadze (GEO)	1
Aik Mnatsakanian (BUL)	8
Adam Gardzioła (POL)	5

Semifinals
Alperen Berber (TUR)	5
Aik Mnatsakanian (BUL)	1

=== Bottom half ===
Round of 32
Filip Šačić (CRO)	9
Evangelos Boukis (GRE)	1
Lukas Ahlgren (SWE)	1
Stanislau Shafarenka (AIN)	3^{F}

Round of 16
Erik Szilvássy (HUN)	1
Islam Aliev (AIN)	6
Filip Šačić (CRO)	6
Karen Khachatryan (ARM)	8
Deni Nakaev (GER)	1
Stanislau Shafarenka (AIN)	5^{F}
Marc Weber (SUI)	3
Yaroslav Filchakov (UKR)	4

Quarterfinals
Islam Aliev (AIN)	8^{F}
Karen Khachatryan (ARM)	0
Stanislau Shafarenka (AIN)	1
Yaroslav Filchakov (UKR)	3

Semifinals
Islam Aliev (AIN)	13
Yaroslav Filchakov (UKR)	2

=== Repechage ===
Repechage round 2
Rafig Huseynov (AZE)	0
Gela Bolkvadze (GEO)	9
Erik Szilvássy (HUN)	10
Karen Khachatryan (ARM)	1

Bronze medal match
Gela Bolkvadze (GEO)	9
Aik Mnatsakanian (BUL)	0
Erik Szilvássy (HUN)	1
Yaroslav Filchakov (UKR)	2

== Final standing ==
Rank	Athlete
1st place, gold medalist(s)	Alperen Berber (TUR)
2nd place, silver medalist(s)	Islam Aliev (AIN)
3rd place, bronze medalist(s)	Gela Bolkvadze (GEO)
3rd place, bronze medalist(s)	Yaroslav Filchakov (UKR)
5	Aik Mnatsakanian (BUL)
5	Erik Szilvássy (HUN)
7	Stanislau Shafarenka (AIN)
8	Filip Šačić (CRO)
9	Adam Gardzioła (POL)
10	Karen Khachatryan (ARM)
11	Alexandru Solovei (MDA)
12	Michael Wagner (AUT)
13	Vasile Cojoc (ROU)
14	Marc Weber (SUI)
15	Vladimeri Karchaidze (FRA)
16	Kelsi Nelaj (ALB)
17	Evangelos Boukis (GRE)
18	Rafig Huseynov (AZE)
19	Lukas Ahlgren (SWE)
20	Deni Nakaev (GER)
