= 2015 World Junior Wrestling Championships =

Junior Wrestling Championships

- Host city: Salvador da Bahia, Brazil
- Dates: August 11–16, 2015

Champions
- Freestyle: Iran
- Greco-Roman: Georgia
- Women: Japan

The 2015 World Junior Wrestling Championships were the 39th edition of the World Junior Wrestling Championships and were held in Salvador da Bahia, Brazil between August 11–16, 2015 .

== Medal table ==
Rank	Nation	Gold	Silver	Bronze	Total
1	Azerbaijan	7	4	3	14
2	Japan	4	3	1	8
3	Georgia	4	1	1	6
4	Iran	3	5	1	9
5	Russia	3	2	9	14
6	Sweden	1	1	2	4
6	Turkey	1	1	2	4
8	United States	1	0	4	5
9	Kazakhstan	0	1	5	6
10	Hungary	0	1	4	5
11	Ukraine	0	1	3	4
12	Belarus	0	1	1	2
12	Bulgaria	0	1	1	2
14	Egypt	0	1	0	1
14	India	0	1	0	1
16	Canada	0	0	2	2
16	Uzbekistan	0	0	2	2
18	Armenia	0	0	1	1
18	Germany	0	0	1	1
18	Honduras	0	0	1	1
18	Italy	0	0	1	1
18	Mexico	0	0	1	1
18	Norway	0	0	1	1
18	Romania	0	0	1	1
Totals (24 entries)		24	24	48	96

== Team ranking ==
Rank	Men's freestyle		Men's Greco-Roman		Women's freestyle	
Rank	Team	Points	Team	Points	Team	Points
1	Iran	62	Georgia	60	Japan	66
2	Azerbaijan	58	Azerbaijan	53	Azerbaijan	47
3	Russia	48	Turkey	44	Russia	47
4	United States	40	Russia	43	Kazakhstan	37
5	India	30	Hungary	34	Ukraine	37

== Medal summary ==
=== Men's freestyle ===
Event	Gold	Silver	Bronze
50 kg	(United States) Spencer Lee	(Iran) Alireza Goodarzi	(Azerbaijan) Arif Huseynov
50 kg	(United States) Spencer Lee	(Iran) Alireza Goodarzi	(Ukraine) Roman Gutsulyak
55 kg	(Azerbaijan) Mahir Amiraslanov	(India) Ravi Kumar Dahiya	(Russia) Khasankhusein Badrudinov
55 kg	(Azerbaijan) Mahir Amiraslanov	(India) Ravi Kumar Dahiya	(United States) Stevan Mićić
60 kg	(Iran) Iman Sadeghikoukandeh	(Egypt) Ibrahim Abdelhamid	(Bulgaria) Dimitar Ivanov
60 kg	(Iran) Iman Sadeghikoukandeh	(Egypt) Ibrahim Abdelhamid	(Russia) Gadzhimurad Rashidov
66 kg	(Azerbaijan) Teymur Mammadov	(Japan) Yuhi Fujinami	(Russia) Zaurbek Sidakov
66 kg	(Azerbaijan) Teymur Mammadov	(Japan) Yuhi Fujinami	(United States) Aaron Pico
74 kg	(Russia) Gadzhi Nabiev	(Iran) Reza Mozaffari Jouybari	(Georgia (country)) Tarzan Maisuradze
74 kg	(Russia) Gadzhi Nabiev	(Iran) Reza Mozaffari Jouybari	(Hungary) Peter Nagy
84 kg	(Iran) Mojtaba Goleij	(Belarus) Dzianis Khramiankou	(Russia) Arsen-Ali Musalaliev
84 kg	(Iran) Mojtaba Goleij	(Belarus) Dzianis Khramiankou	(Kazakhstan) Iliskhan Chilayev
96 kg	(Azerbaijan) Nurmagomed Gadzhiev	(Iran) Seyed Amir Hossini	(Kazakhstan) Bakdaulet Almentay
96 kg	(Azerbaijan) Nurmagomed Gadzhiev	(Iran) Seyed Amir Hossini	(Canada) Nishan Randhawa
120 kg	(Azerbaijan) Said Gamidov	(Iran) Amin Taheri	(Turkey) Yunus Emre Dede
120 kg	(Azerbaijan) Said Gamidov	(Iran) Amin Taheri	(United States) Nathan Butler

=== Men's Greco-Roman ===
Event	Gold	Silver	Bronze
50 kg	(Iran) Reza Khedri	(Georgia (country)) Nugzari Tsurtsumia	(Uzbekistan) Javokhir Mirakhmedov
50 kg	(Iran) Reza Khedri	(Georgia (country)) Nugzari Tsurtsumia	(Kazakhstan) Amangali Bekbolatov
55 kg	(Azerbaijan) Murad Mammadov	(Bulgaria) Yoto Hristov	(Uzbekistan) Islomjon Bakhromov
55 kg	(Azerbaijan) Murad Mammadov	(Bulgaria) Yoto Hristov	(Hungary) Erik Torba
60 kg	(Russia) Sergey Emelin	(Azerbaijan) Karim Jalazov	(Japan) Masuto Kawana
60 kg	(Russia) Sergey Emelin	(Azerbaijan) Karim Jalazov	(Romania) Radu Mihut
66 kg	(Georgia (country)) Ramaz Zoidze	(Russia) Akhmed Kaytsukov	(Azerbaijan) Ruhim Miraiylov
66 kg	(Georgia (country)) Ramaz Zoidze	(Russia) Akhmed Kaytsukov	(Iran) Ali Arsalan
74 kg	(Georgia (country)) Gela Bolkvadze	(Turkey) Burhan Akbudak	(Hungary) Zoltán Lévai
74 kg	(Georgia (country)) Gela Bolkvadze	(Turkey) Burhan Akbudak	(Germany) Hannes Wagner
84 kg	(Turkey) Ali Cengiz	(Azerbaijan) Islam Abbasov	(Sweden) Zakarias Berg
84 kg	(Turkey) Ali Cengiz	(Azerbaijan) Islam Abbasov	(Hungary) Bertlan Papp
96 kg	(Georgia (country)) Nikoloz Kakhelashvili	(Iran) Amir Hossein Hosseini	(Honduras) Kevin Mejia
96 kg	(Georgia (country)) Nikoloz Kakhelashvili	(Iran) Amir Hossein Hosseini	(Russia) Murat Lokyaev
120 kg	(Georgia (country)) Zviadi Pataridze	(Russia) Sergey Semenov	(Turkey) Osman Yıldırım
120 kg	(Georgia (country)) Zviadi Pataridze	(Russia) Sergey Semenov	(Armenia) Edgar Khachatryan

=== Women's freestyle ===
Event	Gold	Silver	Bronze
44 kg	(Azerbaijan) Turkan Nasirova	(Japan) Rina Okuno	(Belarus) Kseniya Stankevich
44 kg	(Azerbaijan) Turkan Nasirova	(Japan) Rina Okuno	(Russia) Nadezhda Sarazhkova
48 kg	(Japan) Miho Igarashi	(Kazakhstan) Irina Borissova	(Russia) Milana Dadasheva
48 kg	(Japan) Miho Igarashi	(Kazakhstan) Irina Borissova	(Ukraine) Oksana Livach
51 kg	(Azerbaijan) Leyla Gurbanova	(Ukraine) Olena Kremzer	(Italy) Arianna Carieri
51 kg	(Azerbaijan) Leyla Gurbanova	(Ukraine) Olena Kremzer	(Russia) Ksenia Nezgovorova
55 kg	(Japan) Nanami Irie	(Hungary) Ramóna Galambos	(Kazakhstan) Marina Sedneva
55 kg	(Japan) Nanami Irie	(Hungary) Ramóna Galambos	(United States) Becka Leathers
59 kg	(Sweden) Elin Nilsson	(Japan) Yoshimi Kayama	(Mexico) Alejandra Bonilla
59 kg	(Sweden) Elin Nilsson	(Japan) Yoshimi Kayama	(Russia) Maria Kuznetsova
63 kg	(Russia) Lyubov Ovcharova	(Azerbaijan) Ragneta Gurbanzade	(Canada) Braxton Stone-Papadopoulos
63 kg	(Russia) Lyubov Ovcharova	(Azerbaijan) Ragneta Gurbanzade	(Sweden) Therese Persson
67 kg	(Japan) Masako Furuichi	(Sweden) Moa Nygren	(Ukraine) Alla Belinska
67 kg	(Japan) Masako Furuichi	(Sweden) Moa Nygren	(Azerbaijan) Elis Manolova
72 kg	(Japan) Rino Abe	(Azerbaijan) Sabira Aliyeva	(Norway) Iselin Moen Solheim
72 kg	(Japan) Rino Abe	(Azerbaijan) Sabira Aliyeva	(Kazakhstan) Gulmaral Yerkebayeva
