= 2022 World Wrestling Championships – Men's Greco-Roman 82 kg =

Wrestling competitions

Men's Greco-Roman 82 kg at the 2022 World Championships
- Venue: Štark Arena
- Dates: 11–12 September 2022
- Competitors: 25 from 25 nations

Medalists
gold medal	Burhan Akbudak	Turkey
silver medal	Jalgasbay Berdimuratov	Uzbekistan
bronze medal	Tamás Lévai	Hungary
bronze medal	Yaroslav Filchakov	Ukraine

The men's Greco-Roman 82 kilograms is a competition featured at the 2022 World Wrestling Championships, and was held in Belgrade, Serbia on 11 and 12 September 2022.

This Greco-Roman wrestling competition consists of a single-elimination tournament, with a repechage used to determine the winner of two bronze medals. The two finalists face off for gold and silver medals. Each wrestler who loses to one of the two finalists moves into the repechage, culminating in a pair of bronze medal matches featuring the semifinal losers each facing the remaining repechage opponent from their half of the bracket.

== Results ==
Legend

- F — Won by fall

=== Final ===
Final
Jalgasbay Berdimuratov (UZB)	6
Burhan Akbudak (TUR)	7

=== Top half ===
Round of 32
Sultan Ali Eid (JOR)	3
Yuya Okajima (JPN)	7
Spencer Woods (USA)	13
Wang Chengwu (CHN)	10^{F}
Jalgasbay Berdimuratov (UZB)	5
Dias Kalen (KAZ)	4
Yang Se-jin (KOR)	0
Tamás Lévai (HUN)	10
David Zhytomyrsky (ISR)	1
Roland Schwarz (GER)	5

Round of 16
Rafig Huseynov (AZE)	7
Yuya Okajima (JPN)	1
Wang Chengwu (CHN)	4
Jalgasbay Berdimuratov (UZB)	8
Ranet Kaljola (EST)	0
Tamás Lévai (HUN)	7
Roland Schwarz (GER)	9
Mihail Bradu (MDA)	7

Quarterfinals
Rafig Huseynov (AZE)	0
Jalgasbay Berdimuratov (UZB)	11
Tamás Lévai (HUN)	4^{F}
Roland Schwarz (GER)	0

Semifinals
Jalgasbay Berdimuratov (UZB)	8
Tamás Lévai (HUN)	0

=== Bottom half ===
Round of 32
Karapet Chalyan (ARM)	3
Filip Šačić (CRO)	1
Yaroslav Filchakov (UKR)	9
Denis Horváth (SVK)	0
Rosian Dermanski (BUL)	2
Petr Novák (CZE)	1
Matteo Maffezzoli (ITA)	2
Daniel Vicente (MEX)	1

Round of 16
Pejman Poshtam (IRI)	2
Karapet Chalyan (ARM)	1
Yaroslav Filchakov (UKR)	3
Harpreet Singh Sandhu (IND)	1
Gela Bolkvadze (GEO)	4
Rosian Dermanski (BUL)	1
Matteo Maffezzoli (ITA)	0
Burhan Akbudak (TUR)	7

Quarterfinals
Pejman Poshtam (IRI)	2
Yaroslav Filchakov (UKR)	5
Gela Bolkvadze (GEO)	0
Burhan Akbudak (TUR)	9

Semifinals
Yaroslav Filchakov (UKR)	1
Burhan Akbudak (TUR)	5

=== Repechage ===
Repechage round 1
Dias Kalen (KAZ)	10
Wang Chengwu (CHN)	2

Repechage round 2
Dias Kalen (KAZ)	0
Rafig Huseynov (AZE)	7^{F}
Matteo Maffezzoli (ITA)	0
Gela Bolkvadze (GEO)	8

Bronze medals
Rafig Huseynov (AZE)	1
Tamás Lévai (HUN)	3
Gela Bolkvadze (GEO)	1
Yaroslav Filchakov (UKR)	3

== Final standing ==
Rank	Athlete
1st place, gold medalist(s)	Burhan Akbudak (TUR)
2nd place, silver medalist(s)	Jalgasbay Berdimuratov (UZB)
3rd place, bronze medalist(s)	Tamás Lévai (HUN)
3rd place, bronze medalist(s)	Yaroslav Filchakov (UKR)
5	Rafig Huseynov (AZE)
5	Gela Bolkvadze (GEO)
7	Wang Chengwu (CHN)
8	Roland Schwarz (GER)
9	Dias Kalen (KAZ)
10	Yuya Okajima (JPN)
11	Karapet Chalyan (ARM)
12	Pejman Poshtam (IRI)
13	Rosian Dermanski (BUL)
14	Matteo Maffezzoli (ITA)
15	Mihail Bradu (MDA)
16	Sultan Ali Eid (JOR)
17	Petr Novák (CZE)
18	Daniel Vicente (MEX)
19	Harpreet Singh Sandhu (IND)
20	Filip Šačić (CRO)
21	David Zhytomyrsky (ISR)
22	Spencer Woods (USA)
23	Ranet Kaljola (EST)
24	Denis Horváth (SVK)
25	Yang Se-jin (KOR)
