= 2016 European U23 Wrestling Championships =

2016 European U23 Wrestling Championship
- Host city: Ruse, Bulgaria
- Dates: 29 March – 3 April 2016

Champions
- Freestyle: Russia
- Greco-Roman: Georgia
- Women: Ukraine

The 2016 European U23 Wrestling Championships was the 2nd edition of European U23 Wrestling Championships of combined events, and took place from 29 March to 3 April in Ruse, Bulgaria.

== Medal table ==
* Host nation (Bulgaria)

Rank	Nation	Gold	Silver	Bronze	Total
1	Russia	7	1	7	15
2	Georgia	4	3	4	11
3	Turkey	4	2	8	14
4	Azerbaijan	3	4	6	13
5	Ukraine	2	4	5	11
6	Hungary	2	0	3	5
7	Germany	1	1	3	5
8	Poland	1	1	2	4
9	Bulgaria*	0	2	1	3
10	Belarus	0	1	3	4
11	Sweden	0	1	2	3
12	Austria	0	1	0	1
12	Croatia	0	1	0	1
12	Czech Republic	0	1	0	1
12	Norway	0	1	0	1
16	Israel	0	0	1	1
16	Lithuania	0	0	1	1
16	Moldova	0	0	1	1
16	Serbia	0	0	1	1
Totals (19 entries)		24	24	48	96

== Team ranking ==
Rank	Men's freestyle		Men's Greco-Roman		Women's freestyle	
Rank	Team	Points	Team	Points	Team	Points
1	Russia	64	Georgia	63	Ukraine	60
2	Georgia	54	Hungary	43	Russia	60
3	Turkey	51	Turkey	38	Turkey	51
4	Azerbaijan	49	Azerbaijan	38	Azerbaijan	49
5	Ukraine	47	Ukraine	33	Belarus	38

== Medal summary ==
=== Men's freestyle ===
Event	Gold	Silver	Bronze
57 kg	(Azerbaijan) Mirjalal Hasanzada	(Turkey) Barış Kaya	(Russia) Ibragim Ilyasov
57 kg	(Azerbaijan) Mirjalal Hasanzada	(Turkey) Barış Kaya	(Moldova) Ivan Zamfirov
61 kg	(Russia) Imam Adzhiev	(Bulgaria) Dimitar Lyubomirov Ivanov	(Azerbaijan) Zalimkhan Valiyev
61 kg	(Russia) Imam Adzhiev	(Bulgaria) Dimitar Lyubomirov Ivanov	(Georgia (country)) Shota Phartenadze
65 kg	(Russia) Murad Nukhkadiev	(Belarus) Surkho Rashytkhanau	(Turkey) Mustafa Zopalı
65 kg	(Russia) Murad Nukhkadiev	(Belarus) Surkho Rashytkhanau	(Germany) Alexander Semisorow
70 kg	(Russia) Rasul Arsanaliev	(Azerbaijan) Gadzhimurad Omarov	(Turkey) Muhammet Akdeniz
70 kg	(Russia) Rasul Arsanaliev	(Azerbaijan) Gadzhimurad Omarov	(Georgia (country)) Davit Buziashvili
74 kg	(Turkey) Muhammet Nuri Kotanoğlu	(Azerbaijan) Murad Suleymanov	(Belarus) Raman Chytadze
74 kg	(Turkey) Muhammet Nuri Kotanoğlu	(Azerbaijan) Murad Suleymanov	(Ukraine) Oleksiy Shcherbak
86 kg	(Russia) Abdulrashid Sadulaev	(Georgia (country)) Irakli Mtsituri	(Turkey) Kadir Yazıcı
86 kg	(Russia) Abdulrashid Sadulaev	(Georgia (country)) Irakli Mtsituri	(Belarus) Aliaksandr Hushtyn
97 kg	(Azerbaijan) Nurmagomed Gadzhiev	(Poland) Mateusz Filipczak	(Russia) Zaynulla Kurbanov
97 kg	(Azerbaijan) Nurmagomed Gadzhiev	(Poland) Mateusz Filipczak	(Georgia (country)) Givi Matcharashvili
125 kg	(Georgia (country)) Geno Petriashvili	(Ukraine) Danylo Kartavyi	(Turkey) Yunus Emre Dede
125 kg	(Georgia (country)) Geno Petriashvili	(Ukraine) Danylo Kartavyi	(Russia) Vitalii Goloev

=== Men's Greco-Roman ===
Event	Gold	Silver	Bronze
59 kg	(Russia) Sergey Emelin	(Azerbaijan) Murad Mammadov	(Israel) Andrey Tsaryuk
59 kg	(Russia) Sergey Emelin	(Azerbaijan) Murad Mammadov	(Germany) Etienne Kinsinger
66 kg	(Poland) Mateusz Bernatek	(Georgia (country)) Tornike Jangavadze	(Serbia) Mate Nemes
66 kg	(Poland) Mateusz Bernatek	(Georgia (country)) Tornike Jangavadze	(Turkey) Enes Başar
71 kg	(Turkey) Yunus Emre Başar	(Croatia) Antonio Kamenjasevic	(Azerbaijan) Ruhin Mikayilov
71 kg	(Turkey) Yunus Emre Başar	(Croatia) Antonio Kamenjasevic	(Georgia (country)) Ramaz Zoidze
75 kg	(Georgia (country)) Gela Bolkvadze	(Sweden) Alex Kessidis	(Poland) Dawid Piotr Klimek
75 kg	(Georgia (country)) Gela Bolkvadze	(Sweden) Alex Kessidis	(Hungary) Zoltán Lévai
80 kg	(Georgia (country)) Lasha Gobadze	(Turkey) Burhan Akbudak	(Ukraine) Yaroslav Filchakov
80 kg	(Georgia (country)) Lasha Gobadze	(Turkey) Burhan Akbudak	(Azerbaijan) Eltun Vazirzade
85 kg	(Hungary) Erik Szilvassy	(Bulgaria) Yoan Danielov Dimitrov	(Sweden) Zakarias Berg
85 kg	(Hungary) Erik Szilvassy	(Bulgaria) Yoan Danielov Dimitrov	(Ukraine) Andrii Gladkykh
98 kg	(Germany) Muhammed Sever	(Georgia (country)) Kukuri Kirtskhalia	(Russia) Musa Evloev
98 kg	(Germany) Muhammed Sever	(Georgia (country)) Kukuri Kirtskhalia	(Hungary) Zsolt Toeroek
130 kg	(Georgia (country)) Iakobi Kajaia	(Ukraine) Vladyslav Voronyi	(Lithuania) Mantas Knystautas
130 kg	(Georgia (country)) Iakobi Kajaia	(Ukraine) Vladyslav Voronyi	(Germany) Christian John

=== Women's freestyle ===
Event	Gold	Silver	Bronze
48 kg	(Turkey) Evin Demirhan	(Norway) Silje Kippernes	(Ukraine) Ilona Semkiv
48 kg	(Turkey) Evin Demirhan	(Norway) Silje Kippernes	(Russia) Milana Dadasheva
53 kg	(Russia) Natalia Malysheva	(Ukraine) Lilya Horishna	(Hungary) Mercedesz Denes
53 kg	(Russia) Natalia Malysheva	(Ukraine) Lilya Horishna	(Azerbaijan) Leyla Gurbanova
55 kg	(Ukraine) Olena Kremzer	(Russia) Alexandra Andreeva	(Turkey) Bediha Gün
55 kg	(Ukraine) Olena Kremzer	(Russia) Alexandra Andreeva	(Azerbaijan) Almaz Ismayilova
58 kg	(Ukraine) Tetyana Kit	(Azerbaijan) Alyona Kolesnik	(Russia) Veronika Chumikova
58 kg	(Ukraine) Tetyana Kit	(Azerbaijan) Alyona Kolesnik	(Turkey) Derya Bayhan
60 kg	(Azerbaijan) Tetiana Omelchenko	(Ukraine) Anhelina Lysak	(Sweden) Therese Lina Persson
60 kg	(Azerbaijan) Tetiana Omelchenko	(Ukraine) Anhelina Lysak	(Poland) Katarzyna Madrowska
63 kg	(Russia) Anzhela Fomenko	(Czech Republic) Adela Hanzlickova	(Turkey) Aslı Tuğcu
63 kg	(Russia) Anzhela Fomenko	(Czech Republic) Adela Hanzlickova	(Ukraine) Solomiya Volska
69 kg	(Turkey) Buse Tosun	(Austria) Martina Kuenz	(Russia) Tatiana Morozova
69 kg	(Turkey) Buse Tosun	(Austria) Martina Kuenz	(Azerbaijan) Elis Manolova
75 kg	(Hungary) Zsanett Nemeth	(Germany) Anna Schell	(Belarus) Natallia Lanko
75 kg	(Hungary) Zsanett Nemeth	(Germany) Anna Schell	(Bulgaria) Gabriela Peycheva
