= 2022 European Wrestling Championships – Men's Greco-Roman 82 kg =

Wrestling competition

Men's Greco-Roman 82 kg at the 2022 European Wrestling Championships
- Venue: BOK Sports Hall
- Location: Budapest, Hungary
- Dates: 2-3 April
- Competitors: 18

Medalists
gold medal	Rafig Huseynov	Azerbaijan
silver medal	Gela Bolkvadze	Georgia
bronze medal	Tamás Lévai	Hungary
bronze medal	Burhan Akbudak	Turkey

The Men's Greco-Roman 82 kg is a competition featured at the 2022 European Wrestling Championships, and was held in Budapest, Hungary on April 2 and 3.

== Results ==
Legend

- F — Won by fall

=== Final ===
Final
Rafig Huseynov (AZE)	2
Gela Bolkvadze (GEO)	1

=== Top half ===
Round of 32
David Zhytomyrsky (ISR)	1
Georgios Prevolarakis (GRE)	10

Round of 16
Rafig Huseynov (AZE)	5
Petr Novák (CZE)	1
Georgios Prevolarakis (GRE)	0
Tamás Lévai (HUN)	8
Johnny Bur (FRA)	4
Marcel Sterkenburg (NED)	4
Karapet Chalyan (ARM)	1
Mihail Bradu (MDA)	1

Quarterfinals
Rafig Huseynov (AZE)	2
Tamás Lévai (HUN)	0
Marcel Sterkenburg (NED)	3
Mihail Bradu (MDA)	10

Semifinals
Rafig Huseynov (AZE)	3
Mihail Bradu (MDA)	1

=== Bottom half ===
Round of 32
Rosian Dermanski (BUL)	1
Yaroslav Filchakov (UKR)	5^{F}

Round of 16
Ranet Kaljola (EST)	3
Filip Šačić (CRO)	11
Pascal Eisele (GER)	7
Matteo Maffezzoli (ITA)	1
Gela Bolkvadze (GEO)	4
Yaroslav Filchakov (UKR)	1
Exauce Mukubu (NOR)	0
Burhan Akbudak (TUR)	5

Quarterfinals
Filip Šačić (CRO)	3
Pascal Eisele (GER)	3
Gela Bolkvadze (GEO)	5
Burhan Akbudak (TUR)	5

Semifinals
Pascal Eisele (GER)	1
Gela Bolkvadze (GEO)	3

=== Repechage ===
Repechage round 1
Petr Novák (CZE)	0
Tamás Lévai (HUN)	9
Yaroslav Filchakov (UKR)	0
Burhan Akbudak (TUR)	8

Bronze medal match
Tamás Lévai (HUN)	4
Mihail Bradu (MDA)	1
Burhan Akbudak (TUR)	6
Pascal Eisele (GER)	1

== Final standing ==
Rank	Wrestler	UWW Points
1st place, gold medalist(s)	Rafig Huseynov (AZE)	15000
2nd place, silver medalist(s)	Gela Bolkvadze (GEO)	13000
3rd place, bronze medalist(s)	Burhan Akbudak (TUR)	11500
3rd place, bronze medalist(s)	Tamás Lévai (HUN)	11500
5	Mihail Bradu (MDA)	10000
5	Pascal Eisele (GER)	10000
7	Yaroslav Filchakov (UKR)	9400
8	Filip Šačić (CRO)	9000
9	Georgios Prevolarakis (GRE)	8500
10	Marcel Sterkenburg (NED)	8100
11	Johnny Bur (FRA)	6000
12	Ranet Kaljola (EST)	5800
13	Karapet Chalyan (ARM)	5600
14	Matteo Maffezzoli (ITA)	5400
15	David Zhytomyrsky (ISR)	5200
16	Petr Novák (CZE)	5100
17	Rosian Dermanski (BUL)	0
18	Exauce Mukubu (NOR)	0
