= 2021 U23 World Wrestling Championships – Men's Greco-Roman 77 kg =

Greco-Roman event at World Wrestling Championship

The men's Greco-Roman 77 kilograms is a competition featured at the 2021 U23 World Wrestling Championships, and was held in Belgrade, Serbia on 1 and 2 November.

== Medalists ==
Gold	Tamás Lévai (HUN)
Silver	Amin Kavianinejad (IRI)
Bronze	Albin Olofsson (SWE)
Bronze	Sergei Stepanov (RUS)

== Results ==
Legend

- F — Won by fall
- WO — Won by walkover

=== Final ===
Final
Tamás Lévai (HUN)	5
Amin Kavianinejad (IRI)	1

=== Top half ===
Round of 32
Dmytro Vasetskyi (UKR)	9
Sajan Bhanwal (IND)	0
Alexandrin Guțu (MDA)	5
Gor Grigoryan (ARM)	11
Gurban Gurbanov (AZE)	9
Zlatomir Emilov (BUL)	0

Round of 16
Tamás Lévai (HUN)	5
Albin Olofsson (SWE)	1
Brandon Calle (COL)	0
Daler Rezazade (TJK)	9
Edvin Kin (EST)	1
Dmytro Vasetskyi (UKR)	7
Gor Grigoryan (ARM)	5
Gurban Gurbanov (AZE)	1

Quarterfinals
Tamás Lévai (HUN)	4
Daler Rezazade (TJK)	0
Dmytro Vasetskyi (UKR)	7
Gor Grigoryan (ARM)	1

Semifinals
Tamás Lévai (HUN)	5
Dmytro Vasetskyi (UKR)	1

=== Bottom half ===
Round of 32
Lamjed Maafi (TUN)	5
Nikoloz Tchikaidze (GEO)	8
Amin Kavianinejad (IRI)	9
Ardit Ndoj (ALB)	0
Dzmitry Bonka (BLR)	8
Jakub Bielesz (CZE)	0
Erkan Ergen (TUR)	7
Akylbek Talantbekov (KGZ)	5
~~Foday Kargbo (SLE)~~
Sergei Stepanov (RUS)	WO
Patryk Bednarz (POL)	3
Per-Anders Kure (NOR)	1
Britton Holmes (USA)	1
Dilshod Omongeldiyev (UZB)	5
Aleksa Ilić (SRB)	5
Azat Sadykov (KAZ)	4

Round of 16
Nikoloz Tchikaidze (GEO)	0
Amin Kavianinejad (IRI)	6
Dzmitry Bonka (BLR)	0
Erkan Ergen (TUR)	2
Sergei Stepanov (RUS)	7
Patryk Bednarz (POL)	1
Dilshod Omongeldiyev (UZB)	2
Aleksa Ilić (SRB)	6

Quarterfinals
Amin Kavianinejad (IRI)	10
Erkan Ergen (TUR)	5
Sergei Stepanov (RUS)	8
Aleksa Ilić (SRB)	0

Semifinals
Amin Kavianinejad (IRI)	8
Sergei Stepanov (RUS)	0

=== Repechage ===
Repechage round 1
Ardit Ndoj (ALB)	0
Nikoloz Tchikaidze (GEO)	10

Repechage round 2
Albin Olofsson (SWE)	7
Daler Rezazade (TJK)	3
Nikoloz Tchikaidze (GEO)	2
Erkan Ergen (TUR)	2

Bronze medals
Albin Olofsson (SWE)	2
Dmytro Vasetskyi (UKR)	1
Nikoloz Tchikaidze (GEO)	0
Sergei Stepanov (RUS)	10
