= 2025 European Wrestling Championships – Men's Greco-Roman 82 kg =

Wrestling competition

Men's Greco-Roman 82 kg at the 2025 European Wrestling Championships
- Venue: X-Bionic Sphere
- Location: Bratislava, Slovakia
- Dates: 12-13 April
- Competitors: 20

Medalists
gold medal	Gurban Gurbanov	Azerbaijan
silver medal	Erik Szilvássy	Hungary
bronze medal	Burhan Akbudak	Turkey
bronze medal	Gela Bolkvadze	Georgia

The men's Greco-Roman 82 kg is a competition featured at the 2025 European Wrestling Championships, and was held in Bratislava, Slovakia on April 12 and 13.

== Results ==
Legend

- F — Won by fall

=== Final ===
Final
Erik Szilvássy (HUN)	0
Gurban Gurbanov (AZE)	6

=== Top half ===
Round of 32
Alexander Johansson (SWE)	3
Denis Horváth (SVK)	0
Michael Wagner (AUT)	1
Filip Šačić (CRO)	8

Round of 16
Erik Szilvássy (HUN)	1
Ruslan Abdiiev (UKR)	1
Alexander Johansson (SWE)	9
Ivo Švígler (CZE)	0
Ilya Bitseyeu (UWW)	0
Filip Šačić (CRO)	3
Burhan Akbudak (TUR)	2
Mihail Bradu (MDA)	1

Quarterfinals
Erik Szilvássy (HUN)	3
Alexander Johansson (SWE)	1
Filip Šačić (CRO)	1
Burhan Akbudak (TUR)	6

Semifinals
Erik Szilvássy (HUN)	5
Burhan Akbudak (TUR)	3

=== Bottom half ===
Round of 32
Artem Shapovalov (FIN)	0
Per-Anders Kure (NOR)	5
Ibrahim Tabaev (BEL)	0
Luca Dariozzi (ITA)	2

Round of 16
Gurban Gurbanov (AZE)	3
Samvel Grigoryan (ARM)	1
Per-Anders Kure (NOR)	1
Islam Aliev (UWW)	5
Svetoslav Nikolov (BUL)	4
Luca Dariozzi (ITA)	0
Ramon Betschart (SUI)	1
Gela Bolkvadze (GEO)	1

Quarterfinals
Gurban Gurbanov (AZE)	2
Islam Aliev (UWW)	1
Svetoslav Nikolov (BUL)	2
Gela Bolkvadze (GEO)	6

Semifinals
Gurban Gurbanov (AZE)	4
Gela Bolkvadze (GEO)	0

=== Repechage ===
Repechage round 2
Ruslan Abdiiev (UKR)	10
Alexander Johansson (SWE)	0
Samvel Grigoryan (ARM)	4
Islam Aliev (UWW)	3

Bronze medal match
Ruslan Abdiiev (UKR)	3
Burhan Akbudak (TUR)	5
Samvel Grigoryan (ARM)	1
Gela Bolkvadze (GEO)	3

== Final standing ==
Rank	Athlete
1st place, gold medalist(s)	Gurban Gurbanov (AZE)
2nd place, silver medalist(s)	Erik Szilvássy (HUN)
3rd place, bronze medalist(s)	Burhan Akbudak (TUR)
3rd place, bronze medalist(s)	Gela Bolkvadze (GEO)
5	Ruslan Abdiiev (UKR)
5	Samvel Grigoryan (ARM)
7	Alexander Johansson (SWE)
8	Filip Šačić (CRO)
9	Islam Aliev (UWW)
10	Per-Anders Kure (NOR)
11	Svetoslav Nikolov (BUL)
12	Luca Dariozzi (ITA)
13	Ramon Betschart (SUI)
14	Mihail Bradu (MDA)
15	Michael Wagner (AUT)
16	Ibrahim Tabaev (BEL)
17	Denis Horváth (SVK)
18	Ilya Bitseyeu (UWW)
19	Artem Shapovalov (FIN)
20	Ivo Švígler (CZE)
