= 2024 European Wrestling Championships =

Wrestling competition held in Bucharest, Romania

2024 European Championships
- Host city: Bucharest, Romania
- Dates: 12–18 February
- Stadium: Polyvalent Hall

Champions
- Freestyle: Turkey
- Greco-Roman: Turkey
- Women: Ukraine

The 2024 European Wrestling Championships was held from 12 to 18 February 2024 in Bucharest, Romania. At the 2024 European Championships, in accordance with sanctions imposed following by the 2022 Russian invasion of Ukraine, wrestlers from Russia and Belarus were not permitted to use the name, flag, or anthem of Russia or Belarus. They instead participated as "Individual Neutral Athletes (AIN)", their medals were not included in the official medal table.

== Competition schedule ==
All times are (UTC+2)

Date	Time	Event
12 February	10.30-14.30	Qualification rounds: GR 55-63-77-87-130 kg
12 February	18:00-19.30	Semi-finals: GR 55-63-77-87-130 kg
13 February	10.30-14.30	Qualification rounds: GR 60-67-72-82-97 kg; Repechage: GR 55-63-77-87-130 kg
13 February	16.45-17.45	Semi-finals: GR 60-67-72-82-97 kg
13 February	18.00-21.00	Finals: GR 55-63-77-87-130 kg
14 February	10.30-14.30	Qualification rounds: WW – 50,55,59,68,76 kg; Repechage: GR 60-67-72-82-97 kg
14 February	16.45-17.45	Semi-finals: WW – 50,55,59,68,76 kg
14 February	18.00-21.00	Finals: GR 60-67-72-82-97 kg
15 February	10.30-14.30	Qualification rounds: WW – 53,57,62,65,72 kg; Repechage: WW – 50,55,59,68,76 kg
15 February	16.45-17.45	Semi-finals: WW – 53,57,62,65,72 kg
15 February	18.00-21.00	Finals: WW – 50,55,59,68,76 kg
16 February	10.30-14.30	Qualification rounds: FS – 57-65-70-79-97 kg; Repechage: WW – 53,57,62,65,72 kg
16 February	16.45-17.45	Semi-finals: FS – 57-65-70-79-97 kg
16 February	18.00-21.00	Finals: WW – 53,57,62,65,72 kg
17 February	10.30-14.00	Qualification rounds: FS – 61-74-86-92-125 kg; Repechage: FS – 57-65-70-79-97 kg
17 February	16.45-17.45	Semi-finals: FS – 61-74-86-92-125 kg
17 February	18.00-21.00	Finals: FS – 57-65-70-79-97 kg
18 February	15.00-16.45	Repechage: FS – 61-74-86-92-125 kg
18 February	17.00-20.00	Finals: FS – 61-74-86-92-125 kg

== Controversies ==
United World Wrestling (UWW) authorized some Russian wrestlers to participate in the European Championships though they are, as claimed by Ukrainian media and Ministry of Youth and Sports of Ukraine, not neutral and support their regime and Russian invasion of Ukraine. Abdulrashid Sadulaev and Zaur Uguev had participated in the pro-war rally and expressed their support for the Russo-Ukrainian war. Other athletes, including Vitali Kabaloev, Anastasiia Sidelnikova, Alina Kasabieva, Nadezhda Sokolova, and Sergey Semenov showed their support of the war by their activities on social media while Artur Naifonov, Aues Gonibov, Aliaksandr Liavonchyk, and Vanesa Kaladzinskaya took part in different propaganda events organized by the Russian and Belarusian regimes.

As a result, Zaur Uguev, Kurban Shiraev, David Baev, Khalid Yakhiev, Artur Naifonov, and Abdulla Kurbanov were denied a visa and Abdulrashid Sadulaev was denied entry to Romania at the Bucharest airport. Imam Ganishov, who managed to compete at the championships, had also visited the occupied territories of Ukraine and published photos with Russian occupying forces.

== Medal table ==
* Host nation (Romania)

Rank	Nation	Gold	Silver	Bronze	Total
1	Turkey	7	6	4	17
–	Individual Neutral Athletes	5	5	11	21
2	Azerbaijan	5	3	8	16
3	Armenia	4	0	2	6
4	Ukraine	1	4	5	10
5	Georgia	1	2	5	8
6	Romania*	1	2	2	5
7	Moldova	1	2	1	4
8	Albania	1	1	0	2
8	Slovakia	1	1	0	2
10	Greece	1	0	1	2
11	Norway	1	0	0	1
11	Serbia	1	0	0	1
13	Bulgaria	0	1	8	9
14	Germany	0	1	2	3
15	San Marino	0	1	0	1
15	Sweden	0	1	0	1
17	Poland	0	0	4	4
18	Hungary	0	0	3	3
18	Italy	0	0	3	3
20	Czech Republic	0	0	1	1
Totals (20 entries)		30	30	60	120

== Team ranking ==
Rank	Men's freestyle		Men's Greco-Roman		Women's freestyle	
Rank	Team	Points	Team	Points	Team	Points
1	Turkey	140	Turkey	147	Ukraine	147
2	Georgia	130	Azerbaijan	142	Turkey	142
3	Azerbaijan	122	Armenia	99	Romania	101
4	Armenia	71	Ukraine	77	Azerbaijan	83
5	Bulgaria	62	Bulgaria	73	Bulgaria	77
6	Ukraine	60	Georgia	66	Moldova	61
7	Slovakia	55	Moldova	63	Poland	60
8	Albania	45	Serbia	35	Germany	53
9	Greece	45	Romania	34	Hungary	39
10	Hungary	40	Hungary	30	France	34

== Medal overview ==
=== Men's freestyle ===
Event	Gold	Silver	Bronze
57 kg	Arsen Harutyunyan; Armenia	Muhammet Karavuş; Turkey	Islam Bazarganov; Azerbaijan
57 kg	Arsen Harutyunyan; Armenia	Muhammet Karavuş; Turkey	Roberti Dingashvili; Georgia
61 kg	Abasgadzhi Magomedov; Individual Neutral Athletes	Zelimkhan Abakarov; Albania	Nuraddin Novruzov; Azerbaijan
61 kg	Abasgadzhi Magomedov; Individual Neutral Athletes	Zelimkhan Abakarov; Albania	Mezhlum Mezhlumyan; Armenia
65 kg	Islam Dudaev; Albania	Gadzhimurad Rashidov; Individual Neutral Athletes	Kizhan Clarke; Germany
65 kg	Islam Dudaev; Albania	Gadzhimurad Rashidov; Individual Neutral Athletes	Ali Rahimzade; Azerbaijan
70 kg	Arman Andreasyan; Armenia	Akaki Kemertelidze; Georgia	Ramazan Ramazanov; Bulgaria
70 kg	Arman Andreasyan; Armenia	Akaki Kemertelidze; Georgia	Ismail Musukaev; Hungary
74 kg	Tajmuraz Salkazanov; Slovakia	Soner Demirtaş; Turkey	Turan Bayramov; Azerbaijan
74 kg	Tajmuraz Salkazanov; Slovakia	Soner Demirtaş; Turkey	Imam Ganishov; Individual Neutral Athletes
79 kg	Akhmed Usmanov; Individual Neutral Athletes	Mahamedkhabib Kadzimahamedau; Individual Neutral Athletes	Avtandil Kentchadze; Georgia
79 kg	Akhmed Usmanov; Individual Neutral Athletes	Mahamedkhabib Kadzimahamedau; Individual Neutral Athletes	Frank Chamizo; Italy
86 kg	Dauren Kurugliev; Greece	Myles Amine; San Marino	Osman Göçen; Turkey
86 kg	Dauren Kurugliev; Greece	Myles Amine; San Marino	Arsenii Dzhioev; Azerbaijan
92 kg	Feyzullah Aktürk; Turkey	Boris Makoev; Slovakia	Magomed Kurbanov; Individual Neutral Athletes
92 kg	Feyzullah Aktürk; Turkey	Boris Makoev; Slovakia	Miriani Maisuradze; Georgia
97 kg	Givi Matcharashvili; Georgia	Magomedkhan Magomedov; Azerbaijan	Vladislav Baitcaev; Hungary
97 kg	Givi Matcharashvili; Georgia	Magomedkhan Magomedov; Azerbaijan	İbrahim Çiftçi; Turkey
125 kg	Taha Akgül; Turkey	Geno Petriashvili; Georgia	Alen Khubulov; Bulgaria
125 kg	Taha Akgül; Turkey	Geno Petriashvili; Georgia	Giorgi Meshvildishvili; Azerbaijan

=== Men's Greco-Roman ===
Event	Gold	Silver	Bronze
55 kg	Artiom Deleanu; Moldova	Rashad Mammadov; Azerbaijan	Denis Mihai; Romania
55 kg	Artiom Deleanu; Moldova	Rashad Mammadov; Azerbaijan	Manvel Khachatryan; Armenia
60 kg	Nihat Mammadli; Azerbaijan	Victor Ciobanu; Moldova	Sadyk Lalaev; Individual Neutral Athletes
60 kg	Nihat Mammadli; Azerbaijan	Victor Ciobanu; Moldova	Răzvan Arnăut; Romania
63 kg	Murad Mammadov; Azerbaijan	Oleksandr Hrushyn; Ukraine	Edmond Nazaryan; Bulgaria
63 kg	Murad Mammadov; Azerbaijan	Oleksandr Hrushyn; Ukraine	Anvar Allakhiarov; Individual Neutral Athletes
67 kg	Hasrat Jafarov; Azerbaijan	Ruslan Bichurin; Individual Neutral Athletes	Abu Muslim Amaev; Bulgaria
67 kg	Hasrat Jafarov; Azerbaijan	Ruslan Bichurin; Individual Neutral Athletes	Murat Fırat; Turkey
72 kg	Selçuk Can; Turkey	Ulvu Ganizade; Azerbaijan	Narek Oganian; Individual Neutral Athletes
72 kg	Selçuk Can; Turkey	Ulvu Ganizade; Azerbaijan	Parviz Nasibov; Ukraine
77 kg	Malkhas Amoyan; Armenia	Yunus Emre Başar; Turkey	Iuri Lomadze; Georgia
77 kg	Malkhas Amoyan; Armenia	Yunus Emre Başar; Turkey	Adlet Tiuliubaev; Individual Neutral Athletes
82 kg	Alperen Berber; Turkey	Islam Aliev; Individual Neutral Athletes	Gela Bolkvadze; Georgia
82 kg	Alperen Berber; Turkey	Islam Aliev; Individual Neutral Athletes	Yaroslav Filchakov; Ukraine
87 kg	Aleksandr Komarov; Serbia	Ali Cengiz; Turkey	Kiryl Maskevich; Individual Neutral Athletes
87 kg	Aleksandr Komarov; Serbia	Ali Cengiz; Turkey	Zhan Beleniuk; Ukraine
97 kg	Artur Aleksanyan; Armenia	Magomed Murtazaliev; Individual Neutral Athletes	Abubakar Khaslakhanau; Individual Neutral Athletes
97 kg	Artur Aleksanyan; Armenia	Magomed Murtazaliev; Individual Neutral Athletes	Kiril Milov; Bulgaria
130 kg	Sergey Semenov; Individual Neutral Athletes	Rıza Kayaalp; Turkey	Beka Kandelaki; Azerbaijan
130 kg	Sergey Semenov; Individual Neutral Athletes	Rıza Kayaalp; Turkey	Danila Sotnikov; Italy

=== Women's freestyle ===
Event	Gold	Silver	Bronze
50 kg	Mariya Stadnik; Azerbaijan	Evin Demirhan Yavuz; Turkey	Miglena Selishka; Bulgaria
50 kg	Mariya Stadnik; Azerbaijan	Evin Demirhan Yavuz; Turkey	Milana Dadasheva; Individual Neutral Athletes
53 kg	Vanesa Kaladzinskaya; Individual Neutral Athletes	Jonna Malmgren; Sweden	Maria Prevolaraki; Greece
53 kg	Vanesa Kaladzinskaya; Individual Neutral Athletes	Jonna Malmgren; Sweden	Zeynep Yetgil; Turkey
55 kg	Andreea Ana; Romania	Mariana Drăguțan; Moldova	Roksana Zasina; Poland
55 kg	Andreea Ana; Romania	Mariana Drăguțan; Moldova	Anastasia Blayvas; Germany
57 kg	Iryna Kurachkina; Individual Neutral Athletes	Evelina Nikolova; Bulgaria	Anhelina Lysak; Poland
57 kg	Iryna Kurachkina; Individual Neutral Athletes	Evelina Nikolova; Bulgaria	Solomiia Vynnyk; Ukraine
59 kg	Alyona Kolesnik; Azerbaijan	Alina Filipovych; Ukraine	Patrycja Gil; Poland
59 kg	Alyona Kolesnik; Azerbaijan	Alina Filipovych; Ukraine	Alesia Hetmanava; Individual Neutral Athletes
62 kg	Grace Bullen; Norway	Luisa Niemesch; Germany	Veranika Ivanova; Individual Neutral Athletes
62 kg	Grace Bullen; Norway	Luisa Niemesch; Germany	Yuliya Tkach; Ukraine
65 kg	Iryna Koliadenko; Ukraine	Kateryna Zelenykh; Romania	Irina Rîngaci; Moldova
65 kg	Iryna Koliadenko; Ukraine	Kateryna Zelenykh; Romania	Elis Manolova; Azerbaijan
68 kg	Buse Tosun Çavuşoğlu; Turkey	Tetiana Rizhko; Ukraine	Adéla Hanzlíčková; Czech Republic
68 kg	Buse Tosun Çavuşoğlu; Turkey	Tetiana Rizhko; Ukraine	Mimi Hristova; Bulgaria
72 kg	Nesrin Baş; Turkey	Alexandra Anghel; Romania	Wiktoria Chołuj; Poland
72 kg	Nesrin Baş; Turkey	Alexandra Anghel; Romania	Yuliana Yaneva; Bulgaria
76 kg	Yasemin Adar Yiğit; Turkey	Anastasiia Osniach; Ukraine	Enrica Rinaldi; Italy
76 kg	Yasemin Adar Yiğit; Turkey	Anastasiia Osniach; Ukraine	Bernadett Nagy; Hungary

== Participating nations ==
519 wrestlers from 36 countries:

1. Albania (6)
2. Armenia (20)
3. Austria (8)
4. Azerbaijan (25)
5. Belgium (2)
6. Bulgaria (29)
7. Croatia (6)
8. Czech Republic (4)
9. Denmark (3)
10. Spain (11)
11. Estonia (7)
12. Finland (6)
13. France (22)
14. United Kingdom (1)
15. Georgia (20)
16. Germany (23)
17. Greece (12)
18. Hungary (18)
19. Israel (8)
20. Italy (17)
21. Kosovo (1)
22. Latvia (5)
23. Lithuania (12)
24. Moldova (25)
25. North Macedonia (9)
26. Netherlands (2)
27. Norway (6)
28. Poland (16)
29. Romania (30) (Host)
30. San Marino (2)
31. Serbia (10)
32. Switzerland (10)
33. Slovakia (6)
34. Sweden (10)
35. Turkey (30)
36. Ukraine (30)
37. Individual Neutral Athletes (57)
38. United World Wrestling (2)

== See also ==
- List of European Championships medalists in wrestling (freestyle)
- List of European Championships medalists in wrestling (Greco-Roman)
- List of European Championships medalists in wrestling (women)
