= Yaroslav Filchakov =

Ukrainian wrestler

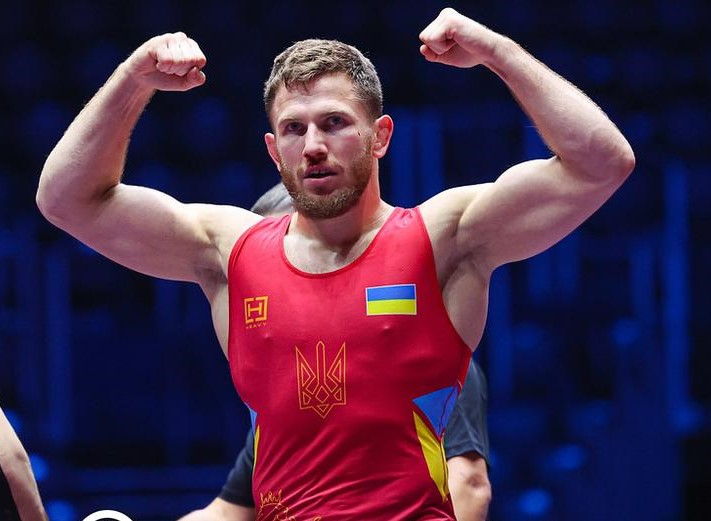
- Filchakov in 2023

Sport
- Country: Ukraine
- Sport: Greco-Roman wrestling
Medal record
Greco-Roman wrestling
Representing Ukraine
World Championships
Bronze medal – third place	2022 Belgrade	82 kg
Bronze medal – third place	2023 Belgrade	82 kg
European Championships
Silver medal – second place	2023 Zagreb	82 kg
Bronze medal – third place	2024 Bucharest	82 kg
Dan Kolov - Nikola Petrov Tournament
Silver medal – second place	2023 Sofia	87 kg
Grand Prix
Gold medal – first place	2022 Zagreb	82 kg
Gold medal – first place	2023 Nice	82 kg
Silver medal – second place	2021 Warsaw	82 kg
Bronze medal – third place	2021 Zagreb	82 kg
European U23 Championships
Silver medal – second place	2018 Istanbul	82 kg
Bronze medal – third place	2016 Ruse	80 kg

Yaroslav Filchakov (Ukrainian: Ярослав Олександрович Фільчаков; born 13 October 1995) is a Ukrainian Greco-Roman wrestler. He competed at the 2022 World Wrestling Championships, winning the bronze medal in the men's Greco-Roman 82 kg event. Filchakov was against Burhan Akbudak for which the score was 5-1, in which he was awarded the bronze medal along with Tamás Lévai.

He competed in the 80 kg event at the 2016 World Wrestling Championships held in Budapest, Hungary. In 2020, he competed in the 82 kg event at the Individual Wrestling World Cup held in Belgrade, Serbia.

He competed in the 82 kg event at the European Wrestling Championships in 2019, 2021 and 2022.

In 2021, he won one of the bronze medals in the 82 kg event at the Grand Prix Zagreb Open held in Zagreb, Croatia. A year later, he won the gold medal in this event at the 2022 Grand Prix Zagreb Open.

He won the silver medal in the 87 kg event at the 2023 Dan Kolov & Nikola Petrov Tournament held in Sofia, Bulgaria. He won one of the bronze medals in the 82 kg event at the 2024 European Wrestling Championships held in Bucharest, Romania.
