= Yunus Emre Dede =

Turkish freestyle wrestler (born 1995)

Personal information
- Born: October 2, 1995 (age 30)
- Height: 1.82 m (6 ft 0 in)
- Weight: 125 kg (276 lb; 19.7 st)

Sport
- Country: Turkey
- Sport: Amateur wrestling
- Event: Freestyle
- Club: Ankara Aski Spor Club
Medal record
Representing Turkey
Men's Freestyle wrestling
Mediterranean Games
Bronze medal – third place	2018 Tarragona	97 kg
Yasar Dogu Tournament
Bronze medal – third place	2014 Istanbul	125 kg
European U23 Championship
Bronze medal – third place	2016 Russe	125 kg
World Juniors Championships
Bronze medal – third place	2015 Salvador da Bahia	120 kg
World University Championship
Silver medal – second place	2016 Çorum	97 kg
World Cadets Championships
Bronze medal – third place	2012 Baku	100 kg
European Cadets Championships
Gold medal – first place	2012 Katowice	100 kg

Yunus Emre Dede is a Turkish freestyle wrestler, competing in the 97 kg division. He is a bronze medalist at the 2018 Mediterranean Games.

== Career ==
In 2015, he won the bronze medal in the men's freestyle 120 kg event at the 2015 World Juniors Wrestling Championships held in Salvador da Bahia, Brazil.

Yunus Emre Dede captured bronze medal in men's freestyle 97 kg at 2018 Mediterranean Games.
