= Aues Gonibov =

Russian Greco-Roman wrestler (born 2001)

Aues Gonibov Ауэс Гонибов
Personal information
- Native name: Russian: Ауэс Муаедович Гонибов
- Full name: Aues Muaedovich Gonibov
- Nationality: (Russia) Russian
- Born: 3 March 2001 (age 25) Tersky District, Kabardino-Balkaria, Russia

Sport
- Country: Russia
- Sport: Wrestling
- Weight class: 82 kg 87 kg
- Rank: International master of sports
- Event: Greco-Roman
- Club: Regional Training Center (Krasnodar krai)
- Coached by: Oleg Shokalov; Timur Umarov; Eduard Belgarokov

Achievements and titles
- World finals: (bronze) (2023)
Medal record
Men's Greco-Roman wrestling
Representing Individual Neutral Athletes
World Championships
Bronze medal – third place	2023 Belgrade	82 kg
U23 World Championships
Gold medal – first place	2024 Tirana	87 kg
U23 European Championships
Gold medal – first place	2024 Baku	87 kg

Aues Muaedovich Gonibov (Russian: Ауэс Муаедович Гонибов; born 3 March 2001) is a Russian Greco-Roman wrestler of Circassian heritage, who competes at 82 kilograms. He is the 2023 world bronze medalist and 2023 Russian national champion.

== Sport career ==
In 2017, he claimed his first Russian silver medal and European title as cadet wrestler at the U17 European championships. In 2018, he won the silver medal at the cadet Russian championships and earned the bronze medal at the cadet European championships, held in North Macedonia. In 2019, he became runner-up at the junior Russian championships and the 2019 World Junior Championships held in Tallinn, Estonia. At the 2020 junior Russian nationals, he came in the first place. In 2021 he competed at the Dumitru Pirvulescu & Vasile Iorga international and earned the silver medal. Twice came in first at the U23 Russian nationals in 2021 and 2022. In 2022, at the senior Russian nationals, he won his first senior bronze medal. In 2023, he came first at the senior Russian championships, where he over Rafael Iunusov of Ulyanovsk Oblast in the final match and made the world team. On September 22, 2023, he competed at the World Championships and lost to Rafig Huseynov of Azerbaijan in quarterfinals, then Huseynov advanced further into the final match and Gonibov offered shot for the bronze medal where he beat world and European champion Burhan Akbudak of Turkey and took his first world bronze medal as an independent neutral athlete. In April 2024, he won the U23 Russian championships. In May 2024, he came first at the U23 European Championships in the men's Greco-Roman 87 kg event.

== Wrestling achievements ==
- 2017 Cadet European championships — 1st.
- 2018 Cadet Russian championships — 2nd.
- 2018 Cadet European championships — 3rd.
- 2019 Junior Russian championships — 2nd.
- 2019 World Junior Championships — 2nd.
- 2020 Junior Russian championships — 1st.
- 2021, 2022 U23 Russian nationals — 2nd.
- 2022, 2024 Senior Russian Championships — 3rd.
- 2023 Senior Russian Championships — 1st.
- 2023 World Championships — 3rd.
- 2021, 2023 CIS Games — 1st.
- 2024 U23 Russian nationals — 1st.
- 2024 U23 European championships — 1st.
