= 2024 U23 World Wrestling Championships – Men's Greco-Roman 87 kg =

Wrestling competitions

Men's Greco-Roman 87 kg at the 2024 U23 World Championships
- Venue: Tirana Olympic Park
- Dates: 22–23 October
- Competitors: 24 from 22 nations

Medalists
gold medal	Aues Gonibov	Authorised Neutral Athletes
silver medal	Marcel Sterkenburg	Netherlands
bronze medal	Achiko Bolkvadze	Georgia
bronze medal	Asan Zhanyshov	Kyrgyzstan

The men's Greco-Roman 87 kilograms is a competition featured at the 2024 U23 World Wrestling Championships, and will be held in Tirana, Albania on 22 and 23 October 2024.

This Greco-Roman wrestling competition consists of a single-elimination tournament, with a repechage used to determine the winner of two bronze medals. The two finalists face off for gold and silver medals. Each wrestler who loses to one of the two finalists moves into the repechage, culminating in a pair of bronze medal matches featuring the semifinal losers each facing the remaining repechage opponent from their half of the bracket.

== Results ==
Legend

- DSQ — Disqualified
- F — Won by fall

=== Final ===
Final
Marcel Sterkenburg (NED)	0
Aues Gonibov (AIN)	4

=== Top half ===
Round of 32
Wang Qimin (CHN)	0
Achiko Bolkvadze (GEO)	9
Baglan Kuanysh (KAZ)	3
Marcel Sterkenburg (NED)	5
Adam Gardzioła (POL)	4
Joju Samadov (AZE)	1
Exauce Mukubu (NOR)	1
Turpal Bisultanov (DEN)	6

Round of 16
Rohit Bura (IND)	4
Achiko Bolkvadze (GEO)	8
Marcel Sterkenburg (NED)	8
Samet Yaldıran (TUR)	7
Yasin Yazdi (IRI)	6
Adam Gardzioła (POL)	1
Turpal Bisultanov (DEN)	4
Péter Dömök (HUN)	0

Quarterfinals
Achiko Bolkvadze (GEO)	2
Marcel Sterkenburg (NED)	11
Yasin Yazdi (IRI)	8
~~Turpal Bisultanov (DEN)~~	2^{DSQ}

Semifinals
Marcel Sterkenburg (NED)	3
Yasin Yazdi (IRI)	1

=== Bottom half ===
Round of 32
Tomislav Brkan (CRO)	1
Payton Jacobson (USA)	3
Ilya Mialeshchyk (AIN)	6
Ivaylo Ivanov (BUL)	1
Asan Zhanyshov (KGZ)	7
Brian Ruíz (VEN)	3
Vladyslav Diahilev (UKR)	8
Julijan Shehu (ALB)	0

Round of 16
Yudai Kobori (JPN)	0
Payton Jacobson (USA)	8
Ilya Mialeshchyk (AIN)	0
Aues Gonibov (AIN)	8
Vigen Nazaryan (ARM)	0
Asan Zhanyshov (KGZ)	6
Vladyslav Diahilev (UKR)	7
Gabriel Lupașco (MDA)	0

Quarterfinals
Payton Jacobson (USA)	1
Aues Gonibov (AIN)	3
Asan Zhanyshov (KGZ)	10
Vladyslav Diahilev (UKR)	2

Semifinals
Aues Gonibov (AIN)	3
Asan Zhanyshov (KGZ)	1

=== Repechage ===
Repechage round 1
Baglan Kuanysh (KAZ)	2
Samet Yaldıran (TUR)	3

Repechage round 2
Samet Yaldıran (TUR)	0
Achiko Bolkvadze (GEO)	9
Ilya Mialeshchyk (AIN)	0
Payton Jacobson (USA)	7

Bronze medals
Achiko Bolkvadze (GEO)	4
Yasin Yazdi (IRI)	4
Payton Jacobson (USA)	0
Asan Zhanyshov (KGZ)	9

== Final standing ==
Rank	Athlete
1st place, gold medalist(s)	Aues Gonibov (AIN)
2nd place, silver medalist(s)	Marcel Sterkenburg (NED)
3rd place, bronze medalist(s)	Achiko Bolkvadze (GEO)
3rd place, bronze medalist(s)	Asan Zhanyshov (KGZ)
5	Yasin Yazdi (IRI)
5	Payton Jacobson (USA)
7	Vladyslav Diahilev (UKR)
8	Samet Yaldıran (TUR)
9	Adam Gardzioła (POL)
10	Ilya Mialeshchyk (AIN)
11	Baglan Kuanysh (KAZ)
12	Rohit Bura (IND)
13	Brian Ruíz (VEN)
14	Tomislav Brkan (CRO)
15	Joju Samadov (AZE)
16	Exauce Mukubu (NOR)
17	Ivaylo Ivanov (BUL)
18	Péter Dömök (HUN)
19	Vigen Nazaryan (ARM)
20	Gabriel Lupașco (MDA)
21	Yudai Kobori (JPN)
22	Julijan Shehu (ALB)
23	Wang Qimin (CHN)
DSQ	Turpal Bisultanov (DEN)
