= Therese Persson =

Swedish footballer

Personal information
- Full name: Therese Hemland fd Persson
- Date of birth: 23 September 1991 (age 35)
- Place of birth: Sweden
- Height: 1.72 m (5 ft 8 in)
- Position: Midfielder

Team information
- Current team: Djurgårdens IF
- Number: 18

Senior career*
Years	Team	Apps	(Gls)
–2014	IFK Täby		
2014	Hammarby IF	25	(1)
2015–2016	Djurgårdens IF	33	(2)
2017–	Täby FK		
- * Club domestic league appearances and goals as of 23:36, 30 January 2025 (UTC)

Therese Persson (born 23 September 1991) is a former Swedish football midfielder. She is currently playing for Täby FK.

Persson started playing football in IFK Täby. She played with Hammarby IF in the 2014 Elitettan and made 15 league appearances and scored one goal.

In April 2015, she joined the then Elitettan side Djurgårdens IF from Hammarby IF. Persson made 26 appearances in her first season in Djurgården and scored two goals. One of them was the finalising 3–1 goal against Östersunds DFF that saw Djurgården win promotion to Damallsvenskan in October 2015. In the following Damallsvenskan season, she made seven appearances and without scoring for Djurgården.

In December 2016, she joined Täby FK.
