= Tamás Lévai =

Hungarian Greco-Roman wrestler

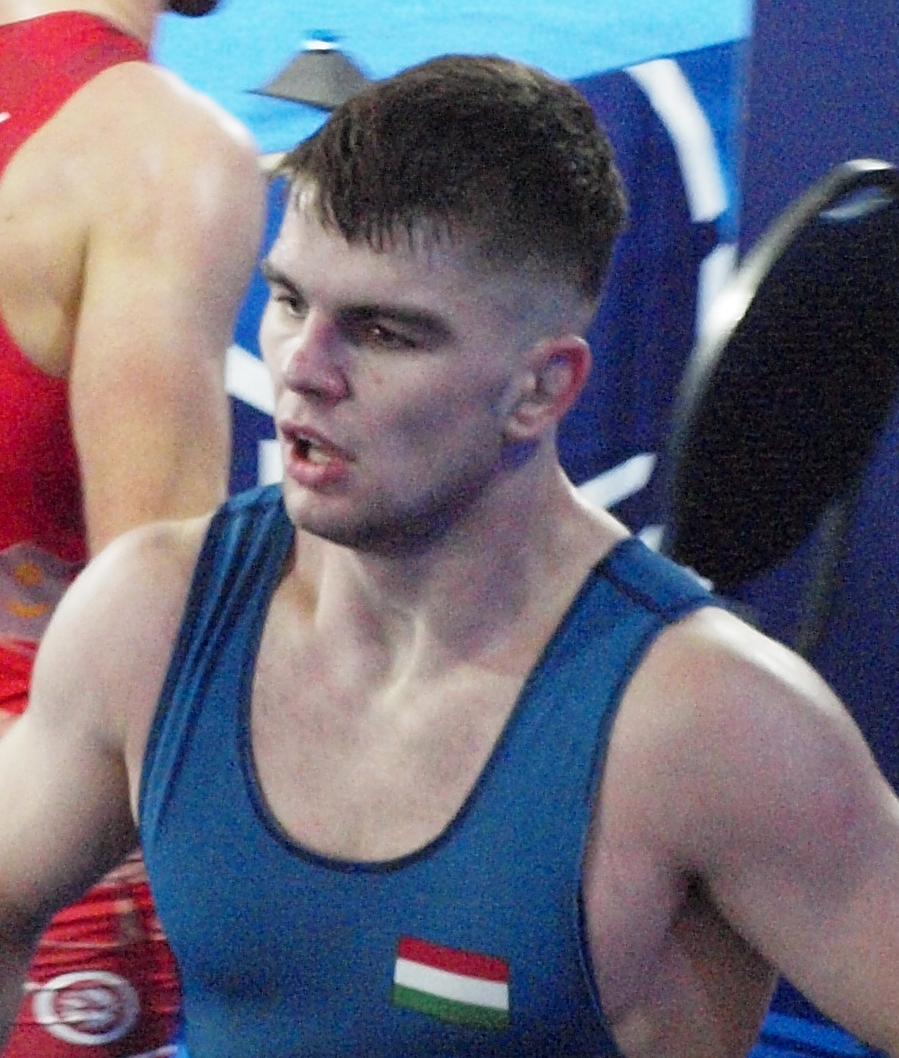

Sport
- Country: Hungary
- Sport: Amateur wrestling
- Event: Greco-Roman
Medal record
Men's Greco-Roman wrestling
Representing Hungary
World Championships
Bronze medal – third place	2022 Belgrade	82 kg
European Championships
Bronze medal – third place	2022 Budapest	82 kg
World Military Championships
Gold medal – first place	2025 Warendorf	87 kg
Vehbi Emre & Hamit Kaplan Tournament
Bronze medal – third place	2023 Istanbul	97 kg
Dan Kolov & Nikola Petrov Tournament
Silver medal – second place	2022 Veliko Tarnovo	82 kg
Grand Prix
Gold medal – first place	2023 Nykoebing	97 kg
Gold medal – first place	2023 Budapest	97 kg
Silver medal – second place	2023 Zagreb	97 kg
Silver medal – second place	2026 Zagreb	87 kg
Bronze medal – third place	2025 Tirana	87 kg
Bronze medal – third place	2025 Budapest	87 kg
World U23 Championships
Gold medal – first place	2021 Belgrade	77 kg
Bronze medal – third place	2018 Bucharest	72 kg
European U23 Championship
Silver medal – second place	2021 Skopje	82 kg
Bronze medal – third place	2019 Novi Sad	77 kg

Tamás Lévai is a Hungarian Greco-Roman wrestler. He won one of the bronze medals in the 82 kg event at the 2022 World Wrestling Championships held in Belgrade, Serbia. He also won one of the bronze medals in the 82 kg event at the 2022 European Wrestling Championships held in Budapest, Hungary.

== Achievements ==
Year	Tournament	Location	Result	Event
2022	European Championships	Budapest, Hungary	3rd	Greco-Roman 82 kg
2022	World Championships	Belgrade, Serbia	3rd	Greco-Roman 82 kg
