= Erkan Ergen =

Turkish Greco-Roman wrestler

Personal information
- Born: May 29, 1998 (age 28) Artvin, Turkey
- Height: 177 cm (5 ft 10 in)
- Weight: 77 kg (170 lb; 12.1 st)

Sport
- Country: Turkey
- Sport: Amateur wrestling
- Event: Greco-Roman
- Club: Bursa BBSK
Medal record
Men's Greco-Roman wrestling
Representing Turkey
European U23 Championship
Bronze medal – third place	2021 Skopje	77 kg
European Juniors Championships
Bronze medal – third place	2018 Trnava	72 kg
Dan Kolov - Nikola Petrov Tournament
Bronze medal – third place	2021 Plovdiv	77 kg

Erkan Ergen (born May 29, 1998) is a Turkish Greco-Roman wrestler competing in the 77 kg division. He is a member of Bursa BBSK.

== Career ==
Erkan Ergen captured bronze medal in men's Greco-Roman 77 kg at 2021 European Wrestling Championships.
