= Islam Aliev =

Russian Greco-Roman wrestler

Personal information
- Full name: Islam Ismailovich Aliev
- Born: Ислам Исмаилович Алиев; 18 September 2001 (age 24) Chechnya, Russia
- Height: 1.80 m (5 ft 11 in)
- Weight: 82 kg (181 lb; 12.9 st)

Sport
- Country: Russia
- Sport: Amateur wrestling
- Event: Greco-Roman
Medal record
Men's Greco-Roman wrestling
Representing Individual Neutral Athletes
European Championships
Silver medal – second place	2024 Bucharest	82 kg
U23 European Championships
Silver medal – second place	2024 Baku	82 kg
Representing Russia
World Juniors Championships
Gold medal – first place	2021 Ufa	77 kg

Islam Aliev (Ислам Алиев; born 18 September 2001) is a Russian Greco-Roman wrestler of Chechen origin who currently competes at 82 kilograms.

== Wrestling career ==
In 2021 in Rostov-on-Don, he won bronze at the Russian Championship in the 72 kg category. In the same year, he became the world junior champion and the winner of the 1st CIS Games.

In 2024, for the first time he became the champion of Russia in the 82 kg weight division. He won the silver medal in the 82 kg event at the 2024 European Wrestling Championships held in Bucharest, Romania.
