= Burhan Akbudak =

Turkish Greco-Roman wrestler

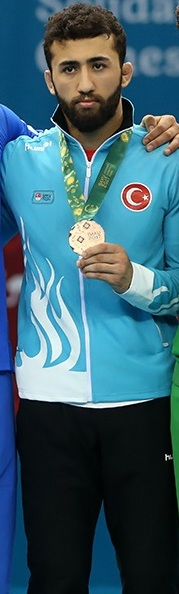

Personal information
- Nationality: Turkish
- Born: 1 June 1995 (age 31) Kahramanmaraş, Turkey
- Education: Bartın University
- Height: 1.80 m (5 ft 11 in)
- Weight: 82 kg (181 lb)

Sport
- Country: Turkey
- Sport: Amateur wrestling
- Event: Greco-Roman - 82 kg
- Team: Istanbul BB SK
Medal record
Men's Greco-Roman wrestling
Representing Turkey
World Championships
Gold medal – first place	2022 Belgrade	82 kg
Silver medal – second place	2021 Oslo	82 kg
European Championships
Gold medal – first place	2023 Zagreb	82 kg
Bronze medal – third place	2022 Budapest	82 kg
Bronze medal – third place	2025 Bratislava	82 kg
Islamic Solidarity Games
Bronze medal – third place	2017 Baku	80 kg
World Military Championships
Silver medal – second place	2024 Yerevan	82 kg
World University Championships
Gold medal – first place	2018 Goiana	82 kg
Vehbi Emre & Hamit Kaplan Tournament
Gold medal – first place	2017 Istanbul	80 kg
Gold medal – first place	2021 Istanbul	82 kg
Gold medal – first place	2022 Istanbul	82 kg
Silver medal – second place	2019 Istanbul	82 kg
Dan Kolov - Nikola Petrov Tournament
Silver medal – second place	2023 Sofia	82 kg
World U23 Championships
Gold medal – first place	2017 Bydgoszcz	80 kg
European U23 Championships
Silver medal – second place	2016 Russe	80 kg
Bronze medal – third place	2018 Istanbul	82 kg
World Juniors Championships
Silver medal – second place	2015 Salvador da Bahia	74 kg

Burhan Akbudak (born 1 June 1995) is a Turkish wrestler competing in the 82 kg division of Greco-Roman wrestling. He is a member of Istanbul BB SK.

== Career ==
Burhan Akbudak, competing in Greco-Roman wrestling 82 kilograms category, won a gold medal in the U23 World Wrestling Championships, which was held in Bydgoszcz, Poland .

Burhan Akbudak won silver at 2021 World Wrestling Championships. Burhan Akbudak, who competed in the World Championship for the first time in the seniors category, faced the European champion and Olympic third runner-up, Azerbaijani Rafig Huseynov, in the final. The Azerbaijani wrestler who won the match 2-1 won the gold medal, while Burhan won the silver medal. Burhan Akbudak, beat Armenian Gegham Torgomyan by 12–0 in the first round, and defeated Hungarian Laszlo Szabo by 11–0 in the second round. Defeating the American Benjamin Provisor in the quarter-finals with a 10-0 point key, the national wrestler won the match with Iranian Pejman Soltanmorad Poshtam 5–2 in the semi-finals and made his mark in the final.

In 2022, he won the gold medal in his event at the Vehbi Emre & Hamit Kaplan Tournament held in Istanbul, Turkey. Burhan Akbudak beat Uzbekistan's Jalgasbay Berdimuratov 7–6 in men's Greco-Roman 82 kg at the 2022 World Wrestling Championships in Belgrade, Serbia, scoring his first-ever gold in the tournament.

Burhan Akbudak became the European champion for the first time at the 2023 European Wrestling Championships in Zagreb, Croatia, by winning the final match of the men's 82 kg wrestling championships with a 3–3 draw with Ukraine's Yaroslav Filchakov and winning with the advantage of the last point. Burhan Akbudak, who started the championship from the last 16 round, defeated his Serbian opponent Branko Kovacevic with 9-0 technical superiority and reached the quarterfinals. In the quarterfinals, Burhan Akbudak met German Roland Schwarz. Burhan defeated his German opponent with the same score of 9-0 technical superiority and made his name in the semifinals. In the semi-final against Azerbaijan's Refik Hüseynov, Burhan Akbudak defeated his opponent with a 5–1 lead and reached the final.

He competed in the 77 kg event at the 2024 Summer Olympics in Paris, France. He was eliminated in his first match by Zoltán Lévai of Hungary.

== Major results ==
Year	Tournament	Location	Result	Event
2017	Islamic Solidarity Games	Baku, Azerbaijan	3rd	Greco-Roman 80 kg
2021	World Championships	Oslo, Norway	2nd	Greco-Roman 82 kg
2022	European Championships	Budapest, Hungary	3rd	Greco-Roman 82 kg
2022	World Championships	Belgrade, Serbia	1st	Greco-Roman 82 kg
2023	European Championships	Zagreb, Croatia	1st	Greco-Roman 82 kg
2025	European Championships	Bratislava, Slovakia	3rd	Greco-Roman 82 kg
