= Zakarias Berg =

Swedish Greco-Roman wrestler

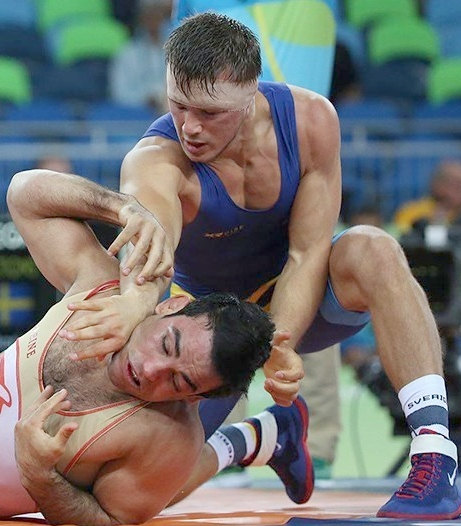
- Berg (top) at the 2016 Olympics

Personal information
- Born: 17 July 1995 (age 31)
- Height: 181 cm (5 ft 11 in)
- Weight: 86 kg (190 lb)

Sport
- Sport: Greco-Roman wrestling
Medal record
European Championships
Bronze medal – third place	2018 Kaspiysk	87 kg

Zakarias Berg (born 17 July 1995) is a Greco-Roman wrestler from Sweden. He competed in the 85 kg weight division at the 2016 Olympics, but was eliminated in the first bout. Then he was the European U23 -85 kg champion, and in 2018, the senior European Championships bronze medalist.

In March 2021, he competed at the European Qualification Tournament in Budapest, Hungary hoping to qualify for the 2020 Summer Olympics in Tokyo, Japan.
