= Gela Bolkvadze =

Georgian freestyle wrestler

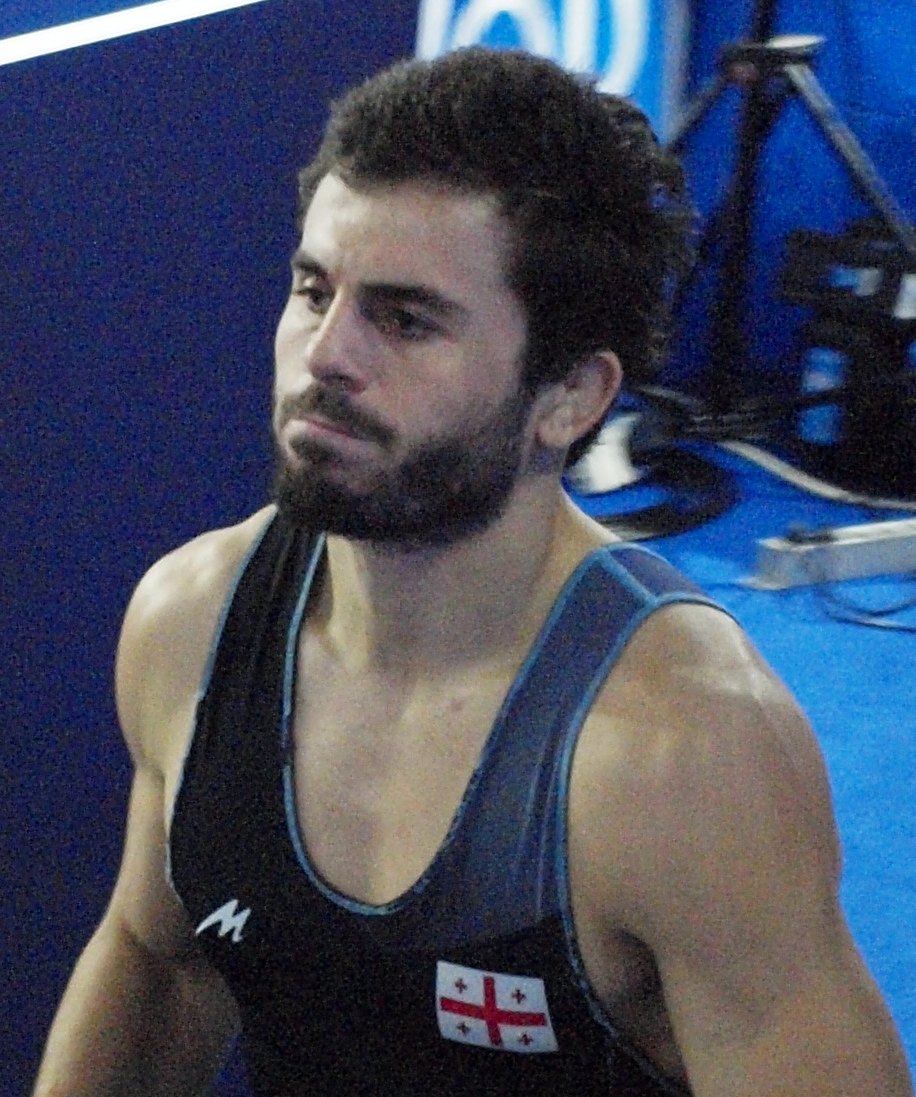

Personal information
- Born: გელა ბოლქვაძე 16 February 1995 (age 31) Batumi, Georgia
- Height: 1.76 m (5 ft 9 in)
- Weight: 82 kg (181 lb; 12.9 st)

Sport
- Country: Georgia
- Sport: Greco-Roman
- Event: 82 kg
Medal record
Men's Greco-Roman wrestling
Representing Georgia
World Championships
| Silver medal – second place | 2025 Zagreb | 82 kg |
| Bronze medal – third place | 2024 Tirana | 82 kg |
European Championships
| Silver medal – second place | 2022 Budapest | 82 kg |
| Bronze medal – third place | 2024 Bucharest | 82 kg |
| Bronze medal – third place | 2025 Bratislava | 82 kg |
| Bronze medal – third place | 2026 Tirana | 82 kg |
Dan Kolov & Nikola Petrov Tournament
| Gold medal – first place | 2022 Veliko Tarnovo | 82 kg |
Grand Prix
| Gold medal – first place | 2023 Alexandria | 82 kg |
| Gold medal – first place | 2024 Nice | 82 kg |
| Silver medal – second place | 2022 Madrid | 82 kg |
| Bronze medal – third place | 2023 Bishkek | 82 kg |
| Bronze medal – third place | 2023 Budapest | 82 kg |
World U23 Championships
| Gold medal – first place | 2018 Bucharest | 82 kg |
| Silver medal – second place | 2017 Bydgoszcz | 75 kg |
European U23 Championship
| Gold medal – first place | 2016 Ruse | 75 kg |
| Silver medal – second place | 2017 Szombathely | 80 kg |
World Juniors Championships
| Gold medal – first place | 2015 Salvador | 74 kg |
European Juniors Championships
| Gold medal – first place | 2014 Katowice | 74 kg |

Gela Bolkvadze (born 16 February 1995) is a Georgian Greco-Roman competing in the 82 kg division.

== Career ==
He won the silver medal at the 2022 European Wrestling Championships in Budapest, Hungary, losing 2–1 to Azerbaijani Rafig Huseynov in the 82 kg freestyle final match.

He won one of the bronze medals in the 82 kg event at the 2024 European Wrestling Championships held in Bucharest, Romania.

== Achievements ==
| Year | Tournament | Location | Result | Event |
|---|---|---|---|---|
| 2022 | European Championships | Budapest, Hungary | 2nd | Greco-Roman 82 kg |
| 2024 | European Championships | Bucharest, Romania | 3rd | Greco-Roman 82 kg |
| 2025 | European Championships | Bratislava, Slovakia | 3rd | Greco-Roman 82 kg |
