= Erik Szilvássy =

Hungarian Greco-Roman wrestler

Personal information
- Born: 21 December 1994 (age 31) Budapest, Hungary
- Height: 1.80 m (5 ft 11 in)
- Weight: 82 kg (181 lb; 12.9 st)

Sport
- Country: Hungary
- Sport: Amateur wrestling
- Event: Greco-Roman
Medal record
Men's Greco-Roman wrestling
Representing Hungary
World Championships
Silver medal – second place	2024 Tirana	82 kg
European Championships
Silver medal – second place	2025 Bratislava	82 kg
Bronze medal – third place	2019 Bucharest	87 kg
Vehbi Emre & Hamit Kaplan Tournament
Bronze medal – third place	2023 Istanbul	82 kg
World University Wrestling Championships
Gold medal – first place	2016 Çorum	85 kg
World U23 Championships
Gold medal – first place	2017 Bydgoszcz	85 kg
European U23 Championships
Gold medal – first place	2016 Russe	85 kg
Grand Prix
Gold medal – first place	2017 Kragujevac	85 kg
Gold medal – first place	2023 Nykoebing	82 kg
Gold medal – first place	2024 Zagreb	82 kg
Silver medal – second place	2017 Paris	85 kg
Silver medal – second place	2018 Zagreb	87 kg
Silver medal – second place	2018 La Habana	87 kg
Silver medal – second place	2020 La Habana	97 kg
Silver medal – second place	2021 Rome	97 kg
Silver medal – second place	2022 Rome	97 kg
Silver medal – second place	2022 Mladenovac	87 kg
Silver medal – second place	2025 Zagreb	82 kg
Bronze medal – third place	2018 Gyoer	87 kg
Bronze medal – third place	2019 Gyoer	87 kg
Bronze medal – third place	2019 Sassari	87 kg
Bronze medal – third place	2022 Warsaw	87 kg
Bronze medal – third place	2025 Budapest	82 kg
Bronze medal – third place	2026 Zagreb	87 kg

Erik Szilvássy is a Hungarian Greco-Roman wrestler. He won one of the bronze medals in the 87 kg event at the 2019 European Wrestling Championships held in Bucharest, Romania.

== Career ==
In 2021, he won the silver medal in the men's 97 kg event at the Matteo Pellicone Ranking Series 2021 held in Rome, Italy.

In 2022, he competed in the 87 kg event at the European Wrestling Championships in Budapest, Hungary where he was eliminated in his first match.
