= Rafig Huseynov =

Azerbaijani Greco-Roman wrestler

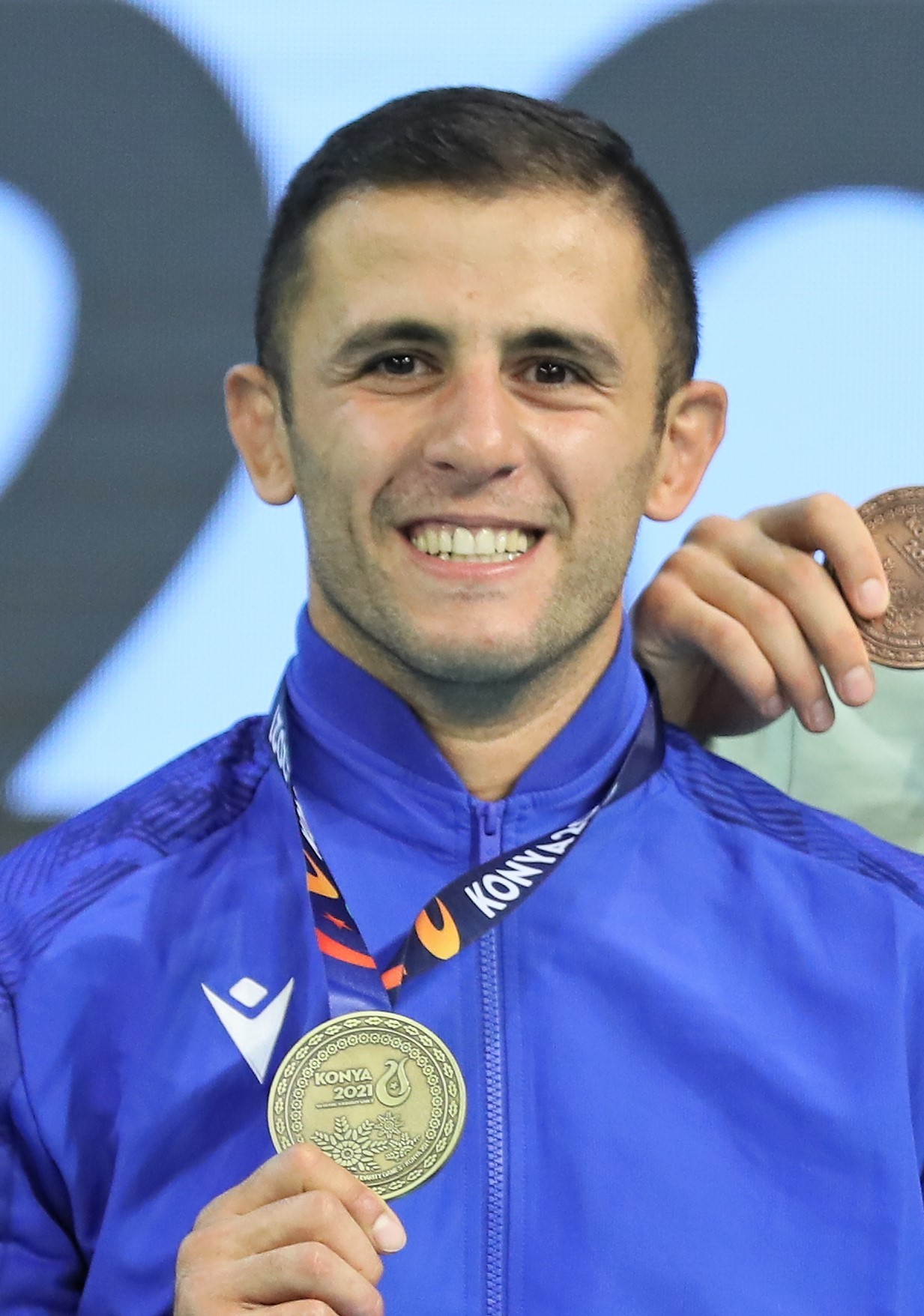
- Huseynov in 2021

Personal information
- Born: 16 May 1988 (age 38) Tashkent, Tashkent Oblast, Uzbek SSR, Soviet Union
Medal record
Men's Greco-Roman wrestling
Representing Azerbaijan
Olympic Games
Bronze medal – third place	2020 Tokyo	77 kg
World Championships
Gold medal – first place	2021 Oslo	82 kg
Gold medal – first place	2023 Belgrade	82 kg
Silver medal – second place	2019 Nur-Sultan	82 kg
European Championships
Gold medal – first place	2022 Budapest	82 kg
Gold medal – first place	2020 Rome	82 kg
Gold medal – first place	2011 Dortmund	74 kg
Bronze medal – third place	2018 Kaspiysk	82 kg
European Games
Silver medal – second place	2015 Baku	80 kg
Islamic Solidarity Games
Silver medal – second place	2017 Baku	80 kg
Gold medal – first place	2021 Konya	82 kg
World Cup
Gold medal – first place	2015 Tehran	Team
Silver medal – second place	2009 Clermont-Ferrand	74 kg
Silver medal – second place	2012 Saransk	74 kg
Bronze medal – third place	2013 Tehran	84 kg

Rafig Huseynov (Azerbaijani: Rafiq Hüseynov; born 16 May 1988) is an Azerbaijani Greco-Roman wrestler. He defeated Hungarian Péter Bácsi for the gold medal in his weight division at the 2011 European Wrestling Championships in Dortmund, Germany.

He won a bronze medal in the men's Greco-Roman 77 kg event at the 2020 Summer Olympics in Tokyo, Japan.

In 2021, Rafig became the world champion; and in 2022 became the European champion for a third time. He competed in the 82 kg event at the 2022 World Wrestling Championships held in Belgrade, Serbia.
