= 2022 Asian Wrestling Championships – Results =

These are the results of the 2022 Asian Wrestling Championships which took place between 19 and 24 April 2022 in Ulaanbaatar, Mongolia.

== Men's freestyle ==
=== 57 kg ===
23 April

Round of 16
~~Ali Aburumaila (PLE)~~
Rikuto Arai (JPN)	WO
Kim Sung-gwon (KOR)	11
Muhammad Bilal (PAK)	0
Rakhat Kalzhan (KAZ)	10
Gayan Ekanayake (SRI)	0

Quarterfinals
Ravi Kumar Dahiya (IND)	15
Rikuto Arai (JPN)	4
Reza Momeni (IRI)	6
Zandanbudyn Zanabazar (MGL)	10
Almaz Smanbekov (KGZ)	4
Kim Sung-gwon (KOR)	1
Rakhat Kalzhan (KAZ)	6
Gulomjon Abdullaev (UZB)	1

Semifinals
Ravi Kumar Dahiya (IND)	12
Zandanbudyn Zanabazar (MGL)	5
Almaz Smanbekov (KGZ)	5
Rakhat Kalzhan (KAZ)	6

Final
Ravi Kumar Dahiya (IND)	12
Rakhat Kalzhan (KAZ)	2

Repechage round 1
Gayan Ekanayake (SRI)	0
Gulomjon Abdullaev (UZB)	4^{F}

Bronze medals
Rikuto Arai (JPN)	9
Zandanbudyn Zanabazar (MGL)	8
Gulomjon Abdullaev (UZB)	7
Almaz Smanbekov (KGZ)	13

=== 61 kg ===
24 April

Round of 16
Jahongirmirza Turobov (UZB)	12
Sampath Nishshanka (SRI)	0
Ali Al-Mohaini (KUW)	0
Rei Higuchi (JPN)	10
Mekan Muhammedow (TKM)	0
Mangal Kadyan (IND)	11
Narmandakhyn Narankhüü (MGL)	14
Muhamad Ikromov (TJK)	4
Dariush Hazratgholizadeh (IRI)	9
Choi In-sang (KOR)	6

Quarterfinals
Ulukbek Zholdoshbekov (KGZ)	6
Jahongirmirza Turobov (UZB)	2
Rei Higuchi (JPN)	10
Mangal Kadyan (IND)	0
Akbar Kurbanov (KAZ)	10
Narmandakhyn Narankhüü (MGL)	0
Dariush Hazratgholizadeh (IRI)	14
Alibeg Alibegov (BRN)	11

Semifinals
Ulukbek Zholdoshbekov (KGZ)	4
Rei Higuchi (JPN)	14
Akbar Kurbanov (KAZ)	5
Dariush Hazratgholizadeh (IRI)	7

Final
Rei Higuchi (JPN)	10
Dariush Hazratgholizadeh (IRI)	0

Repechage round 1
Ali Al-Mohaini (KUW)	0
Mangal Kadyan (IND)	10
Choi In-sang (KOR)	12
Alibeg Alibegov (BRN)	6^{F}

Bronze medals
Mangal Kadyan (IND)	4
Ulukbek Zholdoshbekov (KGZ)	6
Alibeg Alibegov (BRN)	4
Akbar Kurbanov (KAZ)	5

=== 65 kg ===
23 April

Round of 16
Yoo Seon-ho (KOR)	0
Abbos Rakhmonov (UZB)	10
Inayat Ullah (PAK)	0
Rahman Amouzad (IRI)	11
Sanzhar Doszhanov (KAZ)	0
Tseveensürengiin Tsogbadrakh (MGL)	10

Quarterfinals
Bajrang Punia (IND)	3
Abbos Rakhmonov (UZB)	0
Kerim Hojakow (TKM)	2
Haji Mohamad Ali (BRN)	13
Kaiki Yamaguchi (JPN)	0
Rahman Amouzad (IRI)	9
Tseveensürengiin Tsogbadrakh (MGL)	4^{F}
Alibek Osmonov (KGZ)	5

Semifinals
Bajrang Punia (IND)	3
Haji Mohamad Ali (BRN)	1
Rahman Amouzad (IRI)	6
Tseveensürengiin Tsogbadrakh (MGL)	0

Final
Bajrang Punia (IND)	1
Rahman Amouzad (IRI)	3

Repechage round 1
Inayat Ullah (PAK)	0
Kaiki Yamaguchi (JPN)	8^{F}

Bronze medals
Abbos Rakhmonov (UZB)	9
Haji Mohamad Ali (BRN)	0^{R}
Kaiki Yamaguchi (JPN)	8
Tseveensürengiin Tsogbadrakh (MGL)	1

=== 70 kg ===
23 April

Round of 16
Perman Hommadow (TKM)	0
Naveen Malik (IND)	11
Jeong Yong-seok (KOR)	6
Begijon Kuldashev (UZB)	5

Quarterfinals
Ernazar Akmataliev (KGZ)	6
Naveen Malik (IND)	3
Mohammad Abdulkareem (KUW)	0
Enkhtuyaagiin Temüülen (MGL)	10
Mohammad Mehdi Yeganeh (IRI)	2
Taishi Narikuni (JPN)	6
Jeong Yong-seok (KOR)	0
Syrbaz Talgat (KAZ)	11

Semifinals
Ernazar Akmataliev (KGZ)	12
Enkhtuyaagiin Temüülen (MGL)	6
Taishi Narikuni (JPN)	11
Syrbaz Talgat (KAZ)	5

Final
Ernazar Akmataliev (KGZ)	3
Taishi Narikuni (JPN)	4

Bronze medals
Naveen Malik (IND)	8^{F}
Enkhtuyaagiin Temüülen (MGL)	0
Mohammad Mehdi Yeganeh (IRI)	0
Syrbaz Talgat (KAZ)	4

=== 74 kg ===
24 April

Round of 16
Abdullah Abdulkareem (KUW)	0
Daichi Takatani (JPN)	4^{F}
Lakmal Wijesooriya (SRI)	0
Lee Seung-bong (KOR)	10
Ikhtiyor Navruzov (UZB)	11
Yash Tushir (IND)	10
Atamyrat Çarlyýew (TKM)	10
Lou Hong Yeow (SGP)	0

Quarterfinals
Younes Emami (IRI)	7
Daichi Takatani (JPN)	5
Lee Seung-bong (KOR)	4
Bat-Erdeniin Byambadorj (MGL)	5
Nurkozha Kaipanov (KAZ)	11
Ikhtiyor Navruzov (UZB)	0
Atamyrat Çarlyýew (TKM)	0
Islambek Orozbekov (KGZ)	9

Semifinals
Younes Emami (IRI)	10
Bat-Erdeniin Byambadorj (MGL)	0
Nurkozha Kaipanov (KAZ)	15
Islambek Orozbekov (KGZ)	8

Final
Younes Emami (IRI)	5
Nurkozha Kaipanov (KAZ)	2

Bronze medals
Daichi Takatani (JPN)	10
Bat-Erdeniin Byambadorj (MGL)	0
Ikhtiyor Navruzov (UZB)	0
Islambek Orozbekov (KGZ)	11

=== 79 kg ===
23 April

Round of 16
Jasurbek Usmonokhunov (UZB)	4
Seo Bum-gue (KOR)	5
Shuhrat Bozorov (TJK)	1
Yudai Takahashi (JPN)	11
Abdullah Haidar (KUW)	0
Enkhbayaryn Byambadorj (MGL)	10

Quarterfinals
Arsalan Budazhapov (KGZ)	11
Seo Bum-gue (KOR)	0
Gurbanmyrat Öwezberdiýew (TKM)	0
Gourav Baliyan (IND)	10
Zhiger Zakirov (KAZ)	1
Yudai Takahashi (JPN)	8
Enkhbayaryn Byambadorj (MGL)	6
Ali Savadkouhi (IRI)	8

Semifinals
Arsalan Budazhapov (KGZ)	5
Gourav Baliyan (IND)	8
Yudai Takahashi (JPN)	0
Ali Savadkouhi (IRI)	3

Final
Gourav Baliyan (IND)	9
Ali Savadkouhi (IRI)	9

Bronze medals
Gurbanmyrat Öwezberdiýew (TKM)
Arsalan Budazhapov (KGZ)	WO
Enkhbayaryn Byambadorj (MGL)	1
Yudai Takahashi (JPN)	12

=== 86 kg ===
24 April

Round of 16
Gary Chow (SGP)	0
Bobur Islomov (UZB)	10
Shota Shirai (JPN)	6
Mendbilegiin Temüüjin (MGL)	0
Mohsen Mostafavi (IRI)	10
Döwletmyrat Orazgylyjow (TKM)	0

Quarterfinals
Azamat Dauletbekov (KAZ)	11
Bobur Islomov (UZB)	0
Muhammad Inam (PAK)	5
Saiakbai Usupov (KGZ)	6
Kim Gwan-uk (KOR)	12
Shota Shirai (JPN)	1
Mohsen Mostafavi (IRI)	0
Deepak Punia (IND)	6

Semifinals
Azamat Dauletbekov (KAZ)	10
Saiakbai Usupov (KGZ)	0
Kim Gwan-uk (KOR)	0
Deepak Punia (IND)	5

Final
Azamat Dauletbekov (KAZ)	6
Deepak Punia (IND)	1

Bronze medals
Bobur Islomov (UZB)	6
Saiakbai Usupov (KGZ)	5
Mohsen Mostafavi (IRI)	4
Kim Gwan-uk (KOR)	0

=== 92 kg ===
24 April

Quarterfinals		Semifinals		Final
Takuma Otsu (JPN)	5^{F}
Kim Jin-myeong (KOR)	0	Takuma Otsu (JPN)	0
Amir Hossein Firouzpour (IRI)	11	Amir Hossein Firouzpour (IRI)	10
Adilet Davlumbayev (KAZ)	0			Amir Hossein Firouzpour (IRI)	11
Vicky Chahar (IND)	4			Dagvadorjiin Orgilokh (MGL)	0
Mirlan Chynybekov (KGZ)	3	Vicky Chahar (IND)	0
Ajiniyaz Saparniyazov (UZB)	0	Dagvadorjiin Orgilokh (MGL)	11
Dagvadorjiin Orgilokh (MGL)	11

Bronze medals
Adilet Davlumbayev (KAZ)	10^{F}
Takuma Otsu (JPN)	12
Ajiniyaz Saparniyazov (UZB)	3
Vicky Chahar (IND)	5

=== 97 kg ===
23 April

Quarterfinals		Semifinals		Final
Ölziisaikhany Batzul (MGL)	9
Mamed Ibragimov (KAZ)	5	Ölziisaikhany Batzul (MGL)	9^{F}
Mukhammadrasul Rakhimov (UZB)	5	Mukhammadrasul Rakhimov (UZB)	0
Seo Min-won (KOR)	4			Ölziisaikhany Batzul (MGL)	0
Satyawart Kadian (IND)	5			Mohammad Hossein Mohammadian (IRI)	11
Takashi Ishiguro (JPN)	0	Satyawart Kadian (IND)	0
Zyýamuhammet Saparow (TKM)	0	Mohammad Hossein Mohammadian (IRI)	10
Mohammad Hossein Mohammadian (IRI)	10

Bronze medals
Mamed Ibragimov (KAZ)	3
Mukhammadrasul Rakhimov (UZB)	2
Zyýamuhammet Saparow (TKM)	0
Satyawart Kadian (IND)	10

=== 125 kg ===
24 April

Round of 16
Jung Yei-hyun (KOR)	6^{F}
Rustam Iskandari (TJK)	0

Quarterfinals
Anirudh Gulia (IND)	4
Jung Yei-hyun (KOR)	8
Şatlyk Hemelýäýew (TKM)	4
Alisher Yergali (KAZ)	14
Sardorbek Kholmatov (UZB)	2
Yadollah Mohebbi (IRI)	11^{F}
Enkhtüvshingiin Batmagnai (MGL)	5
Taiki Yamamoto (JPN)	1

Semifinals
Jung Yei-hyun (KOR)	6
Alisher Yergali (KAZ)	9
Yadollah Mohebbi (IRI)	12
Enkhtüvshingiin Batmagnai (MGL)	2

Final
Alisher Yergali (KAZ)	1
Yadollah Mohebbi (IRI)	3

Bronze medals
Şatlyk Hemelýäýew (TKM)	0
Jung Yei-hyun (KOR)	4^{F}
Sardorbek Kholmatov (UZB)	12
Enkhtüvshingiin Batmagnai (MGL)	15

== Men's Greco-Roman ==
=== 55 kg ===
19 April

Round of 16
Ali Nourbakhsh (IRI)	5
Arjun Halakurki (IND)	10

Quarterfinals
Amangali Bekbolatov (KAZ)	10
Arjun Halakurki (IND)	1
~~Mostafa Al-Qade (JOR)~~
Mönkh-Erdeniin Davaabandi (MGL)	WO
Jasurbek Ortikboev (UZB)	9
Balbai Dordokov (KGZ)	0
Yu Shiotani (JPN)	6
Jeon Hyeok-jin (KOR)	5

Semifinals
Amangali Bekbolatov (KAZ)	7
Mönkh-Erdeniin Davaabandi (MGL)	1
Jasurbek Ortikboev (UZB)	8
Yu Shiotani (JPN)	10

Final
Amangali Bekbolatov (KAZ)	2
Yu Shiotani (JPN)	13

Bronze medals
Arjun Halakurki (IND)	10
Mönkh-Erdeniin Davaabandi (MGL)	7
Jeon Hyeok-jin (KOR)	0
Jasurbek Ortikboev (UZB)	8

=== 60 kg ===
20 April

Quarterfinals		Semifinals		Final
Zholaman Sharshenbekov (KGZ)	8
Tseveenravdangiin Baljinnyam (MGL)	0	Zholaman Sharshenbekov (KGZ)	6
Chung Han-jae (KOR)	1	Yernur Fidakhmetov (KAZ)	1
Yernur Fidakhmetov (KAZ)	3			Zholaman Sharshenbekov (KGZ)	4
Ayata Suzuki (JPN)	12			Mehdi Mohsennejad (IRI)	0^{R}
Firuz Tukhtaev (UZB)	3	Ayata Suzuki (JPN)	4
Mehdi Mohsennejad (IRI)	9	Mehdi Mohsennejad (IRI)	5
Gyanender Dahiya (IND)	0

Bronze medals
Tseveenravdangiin Baljinnyam (MGL)	6
Yernur Fidakhmetov (KAZ)	12
Gyanender Dahiya (IND)	0
Ayata Suzuki (JPN)	11

- Firuz Tukhtaev of Uzbekistan originally finished seventh, but was disqualified.

=== 63 kg ===
19 April

Round of 16
Iman Mohammadi (IRI)	12
Damjingiin Baljinnyam (MGL)	4

Quarterfinals
Kensuke Shimizu (JPN)	0
Iman Mohammadi (IRI)	2
~~Ahmad Al-Nakdali (SYR)~~
Meirambek Ainagulov (KAZ)	WO
Neeraj Chhikara (IND)	4
Tynar Sharshenbekov (KGZ)	10^{F}
Song Jin-seub (KOR)	1
Islomjon Bakhromov (UZB)	9

Semifinals
Iman Mohammadi (IRI)	3
Meirambek Ainagulov (KAZ)	14
Tynar Sharshenbekov (KGZ)	13^{F}
Islomjon Bakhromov (UZB)	7

Final
Meirambek Ainagulov (KAZ)	0
Tynar Sharshenbekov (KGZ)	5^{F}

Bronze medals
~~Ahmad Al-Nakdali (SYR)~~
Iman Mohammadi (IRI)	WO
Neeraj Chhikara (IND)	7
Islomjon Bakhromov (UZB)	4

=== 67 kg ===
20 April

Round of 16
Shahin Badaghi (IRI)	WO
~~Mohammad Fwaz (SYR)~~

Quarterfinals
Ryu Han-su (KOR)	8
Shahin Badaghi (IRI)	0
Katsuaki Endo (JPN)	6
Eldiiar Satarov (KGZ)	1
Meirzhan Shermakhanbet (KAZ)	8^{F}
Sachin Sahrawat (IND)	0
Battulgyn Nyamdorj (MGL)	5
Makhmud Bakhshilloev (UZB)	14

Semifinals
Ryu Han-su (KOR)	6
Katsuaki Endo (JPN)	2
Meirzhan Shermakhanbet (KAZ)	6
Makhmud Bakhshilloev (UZB)	3

Final
Ryu Han-su (KOR)	3
Meirzhan Shermakhanbet (KAZ)	11

Bronze medals
Shahin Badaghi (IRI)	1
Katsuaki Endo (JPN)	7
Sachin Sahrawat (IND)	7^{F}
Makhmud Bakhshilloev (UZB)	3

=== 72 kg ===
20 April

Quarterfinals		Semifinals		Final
Mohammad Reza Mokhtari (IRI)	9
Adilkhan Nurlanbekov (KGZ)	0	Mohammad Reza Mokhtari (IRI)	9
Mirzobek Rakhmatov (UZB)	8	Mirzobek Rakhmatov (UZB)	0
Vikas Dalal (IND)	0			Mohammad Reza Mokhtari (IRI)	4
Abylaikhan Amzeyev (KAZ)	8			Abylaikhan Amzeyev (KAZ)	1
Shogo Takahashi (JPN)	0	Abylaikhan Amzeyev (KAZ)	5
Gankhuyagiin Khanbürged (MGL)	2	Lee Ji-yeon (KOR)	3
Lee Ji-yeon (KOR)	6

Bronze medals
Adilkhan Nurlanbekov (KGZ)	3
Mirzobek Rakhmatov (UZB)	3
Shogo Takahashi (JPN)	11
Lee Ji-yeon (KOR)	3

=== 77 kg ===
19 April

Quarterfinals		Semifinals		Final
Akzhol Makhmudov (KGZ)	9
Aref Habibollahi (IRI)	1	Akzhol Makhmudov (KGZ)	4
Kim Hyeon-woo (KOR)	7	Kim Hyeon-woo (KOR)	1
Aram Vardanyan (UZB)	1			Akzhol Makhmudov (KGZ)	3
Sajan Bhanwal (IND)	0			Maxat Yerezhepov (KAZ)	1
Maxat Yerezhepov (KAZ)	8	Maxat Yerezhepov (KAZ)	3
Olonbayaryn Süldkhüü (MGL)	0	Kodai Sakuraba (JPN)	2
Kodai Sakuraba (JPN)	9

Bronze medals
Aref Habibollahi (IRI)	WO
Kim Hyeon-woo (KOR)
Sajan Bhanwal (IND)	1
Kodai Sakuraba (JPN)	11

=== 82 kg ===
20 April

Round of 16
Damjingiin Batzul (MGL)	0
Mukhammadkodir Rasulov (UZB)	10
~~Sultan Ali Eid (JOR)~~
Yang Se-jin (KOR)	WO

Quarterfinals
Dias Kalen (KAZ)	9
Mukhammadkodir Rasulov (UZB)	1
Kalidin Asykeev (KGZ)	3
Yuya Okajima (JPN)	5
Jafar Khan (QAT)	0
Rasoul Garmsiri (IRI)	8
Yang Se-jin (KOR)	2
Harpreet Singh Sandhu (IND)	4

Semifinals
Dias Kalen (KAZ)	9
Yuya Okajima (JPN)	0
Rasoul Garmsiri (IRI)	5^{F}
Harpreet Singh Sandhu (IND)	0

Final
Dias Kalen (KAZ)	3
Rasoul Garmsiri (IRI)	4

Bronze medals
Mukhammadkodir Rasulov (UZB)	5
Yuya Okajima (JPN)	1
Jafar Khan (QAT)
Harpreet Singh Sandhu (IND)	WO

=== 87 kg ===
19 April

Quarterfinals		Semifinals		Final
Nursultan Tursynov (KAZ)	9
Kim Jin-hyeok (KOR)	0	Nursultan Tursynov (KAZ)	0
Melis Aitbekov (KGZ)	1	Nasser Alizadeh (IRI)	3
Nasser Alizadeh (IRI)	7			Nasser Alizadeh (IRI)	3
Jalgasbay Berdimuratov (UZB)	11			Jalgasbay Berdimuratov (UZB)	1
Lutbayaryn Batbayar (MGL)	0	Jalgasbay Berdimuratov (UZB)	8
Masato Sumi (JPN)	3	Sunil Kumar (IND)	0
Sunil Kumar (IND)	5

Bronze medals
Melis Aitbekov (KGZ)	2
Nursultan Tursynov (KAZ)	7
Lutbayaryn Batbayar (MGL)	1
Sunil Kumar (IND)	9

=== 97 kg ===
20 April

Quarterfinals		Semifinals		Final
Rustam Assakalov (UZB)	10
Takahiro Tsuruda (JPN)	0	Rustam Assakalov (UZB)	8
Tsogtbayaryn Mönkhbayar (MGL)	0	Sanzhar Serikkan (KAZ)	0
Sanzhar Serikkan (KAZ)	9			Rustam Assakalov (UZB)	1
Park Je-woo (KOR)	4			Mehdi Bali (IRI)	5
Mehdi Bali (IRI)	4^{F}	Mehdi Bali (IRI)	4
Ravi Rathee (IND)	1	Uzur Dzhuzupbekov (KGZ)	1
Uzur Dzhuzupbekov (KGZ)	3

Bronze medals
Takahiro Tsuruda (JPN)	6
Sanzhar Serikkan (KAZ)	6
Park Je-woo (KOR)	1
Uzur Dzhuzupbekov (KGZ)	10

=== 130 kg ===
19 April

Round of 16
Prem Saroha (IND)	0
Amir Ghasemi Monjazi (IRI)	5

Quarterfinals
Muminjon Abdullaev (UZB)	9
Amir Ghasemi Monjazi (IRI)	8
Timothy Loh (SGP)	0
Kim Min-seok (KOR)	4^{F}
Arata Sonoda (JPN)	7
Dorjkhandyn Khüderbulga (MGL)	1
Roman Kim (KGZ)	3
Alimkhan Syzdykov (KAZ)	12

Semifinals
Muminjon Abdullaev (UZB)	1
Kim Min-seok (KOR)	10
Arata Sonoda (JPN)	0
Alimkhan Syzdykov (KAZ)	8

Final
Kim Min-seok (KOR)	0
Alimkhan Syzdykov (KAZ)	9^{F}

Bronze medals
Timothy Loh (SGP)	0
Muminjon Abdullaev (UZB)	4^{F}
Roman Kim (KGZ)	WO
Arata Sonoda (JPN)

== Women's freestyle ==
=== 50 kg ===
21 April

Pos	Athlete	Pld	W	L	CP	TP	JPN	IND	KOR
1	Remina Yoshimoto (JPN)	2	2	0	9	14	—	4–0 Fall	10–0
2	Manisha (IND)	2	1	1	4	12	0–5 FA	—	12–1
3	Cheon Mi-ran (KOR)	2	0	2	1	1	0–4 SU	1–4 SU1	—

Source: UWW

Pos	Athlete	Pld	W	L	CP	TP	MGL	UZB	KAZ
1	Tsogt-Ochiryn Namuuntsetseg (MGL)	2	2	0	8	20	—	10–0	10–0
2	Jasmina Immaeva (UZB)	2	1	1	4	12	0–4 SU	—	12–1
3	Aigul Nuralim (KAZ)	2	0	2	1	1	0–4 SU	1–4 SU1	—

Source: UWW

Semifinals
Remina Yoshimoto (JPN)	10
Jasmina Immaeva (UZB)	0
Tsogt-Ochiryn Namuuntsetseg (MGL)	11^{F}
Manisha (IND)	4

Final
Remina Yoshimoto (JPN)	12^{F}
Tsogt-Ochiryn Namuuntsetseg (MGL)	2
Bronze medal
Jasmina Immaeva (UZB)	10^{F}
Manisha (IND)	0

=== 53 kg ===
22 April

Pos	Athlete	Pld	W	L	CP	TP	JPN	MGL	IND
1	Akari Fujinami (JPN)	2	2	0	8	20	—	10–0	10–0
2	Batkhuyagiin Khulan (MGL)	2	1	1	5	6	0–4 SU	—	6–6 Fall
3	Swati Sanjay Shinde (IND)	2	0	2	0	6	0–4 SU	0–5 FA	—

Source: UWW

Pos	Athlete	Pld	W	L	CP	TP	KAZ	UZB	KOR
1	Zhuldyz Eshimova (KAZ)	2	2	0	6	10	—	1–1	9–8
2	Aktenge Keunimjaeva (UZB)	2	1	1	6	11	1–3 PO1	—	10–0 Fall
3	Oh Hyun-young (KOR)	2	0	2	1	8	1–3 PO1	0–5 FA	—

Source: UWW

Semifinals
Akari Fujinami (JPN)	10
Aktenge Keunimjaeva (UZB)	0
Zhuldyz Eshimova (KAZ)	0
Batkhuyagiin Khulan (MGL)	3

Final
Akari Fujinami (JPN)	11
Batkhuyagiin Khulan (MGL)	0
Bronze medal
Aktenge Keunimjaeva (UZB)	1
Zhuldyz Eshimova (KAZ)	5

=== 55 kg ===
21 April

Pos	Athlete	Pld	W	L	CP	TP	JPN	MGL	IND	KAZ	UZB
1	Umi Imai (JPN)	4	4	0	16	42	—	12–3	10–0	10–0	10–0 Fall
2	Ganbaataryn Otgonjargal (MGL)	4	3	1	14	31	1–3 PO1	—	15–5	11–0	2–2 Fall
3	Sushma Shokeen (IND)	4	2	2	9	22	0–4 SU	1–4 SU1	—	5–0	12–0 Fall
4	Altyn Shagayeva (KAZ)	4	1	3	3	7	0–4 SU	0–4 SU	0–3 PO	—	7–1
5	Sarbinaz Jienbaeva (UZB)	4	0	4	1	3	0–5 FA	0–5 FA	0–5 FA	1–3 PO1	—

Source: UWW

=== 57 kg ===
22 April

Pos	Athlete	Pld	W	L	CP	TP	IND	UZB	SGP
1	Anshu Malik (IND)	2	2	0	8	20	—	10–0	10–0
2	Shokhida Akhmedova (UZB)	2	1	1	4	10	0–4 SU	—	10–0
3	Danielle Lim (SGP)	2	0	2	0	0	0–4 SU	0–4 SU	—

Source: UWW

Pos	Athlete	Pld	W	L	CP	TP	JPN	MGL	KAZ	KOR
1	Tsugumi Sakurai (JPN)	3	3	0	12	22	—	5–0	7–0 Fall	10–0
2	Khürelkhüügiin Bolortuyaa (MGL)	3	2	1	6	14	0–3 PO	—	8–2	6–2
3	Nilufar Raimova (KAZ)	3	1	2	6	8	0–5 FA	1–3 PO1	—	6–0 Fall
4	Kim Hyung-joo (KOR)	3	0	3	1	2	0–4 SU	1–3 PO1	0–5 FA	—

Source: UWW

Semifinals
Anshu Malik (IND)	11
Khürelkhüügiin Bolortuyaa (MGL)	0
Tsugumi Sakurai (JPN)	12
Shokhida Akhmedova (UZB)	2

Final
Anshu Malik (IND)	0
Tsugumi Sakurai (JPN)	4^{F}
Bronze medal
Khürelkhüügiin Bolortuyaa (MGL)	11
Shokhida Akhmedova (UZB)	1

=== 59 kg ===
21 April

Pos	Athlete	Pld	W	L	CP	TP	JPN	MGL	IND	KAZ	UZB
1	Sara Natami (JPN)	4	4	0	15	34	—	4–2	10–0	10–6	10–0 Fall
2	Baatarjavyn Shoovdor (MGL)	4	3	1	11	19	1–3 PO1	—	2–1	5–0	10–0
3	Sarita Mor (IND)	4	2	2	8	17	0–4 SU	1–3 PO1	—	5–2	11–0
4	Diana Kayumova (KAZ)	4	1	3	5	18	1–3 PO1	0–3 PO	1–3 PO1	—	10–4
5	Dilfuza Aimbetova (UZB)	4	0	4	1	4	0–5 FA	0–4 SU	0–4 SU	1–3 PO1	—

Source: UWW

=== 62 kg ===
22 April

Quarterfinals		Semifinals		Final
Aisuluu Tynybekova (KGZ)	7
Boldsaikhan Khongorzul (MGL)	3	Aisuluu Tynybekova (KGZ)	6^{F}
Nabira Esenbaeva (UZB)	4^{F}	Nabira Esenbaeva (UZB)	0
Sachini Umanga (SRI)	0			Aisuluu Tynybekova (KGZ)	1^{R}
Ayaulym Kassymova (KAZ)	0			Nonoka Ozaki (JPN)	9
Manisha Bhanwala (IND)	9	Manisha Bhanwala (IND)	0
Lee Han-bit (KOR)	0	Nonoka Ozaki (JPN)	10
Nonoka Ozaki (JPN)	10

Bronze medals
Boldsaikhan Khongorzul (MGL)	10
Nabira Esenbaeva (UZB)	0
Lee Han-bit (KOR)	2
Manisha Bhanwala (IND)	4^{F}

=== 65 kg ===
22 April

Pos	Athlete	Pld	W	L	CP	TP	JPN	IND	MGL	KAZ	UZB
1	Miwa Morikawa (JPN)	4	4	0	16	30	—	10–0	7–3	10–0	3–0 Fall
2	Radhika Jaglan (IND)	4	3	1	12	22	0–4 SU	—	8–6	10–0	4–2 Fall
3	Ölziisaikhany Pürevsüren (MGL)	4	2	2	11	33	1–3 PO1	1–3 PO1	—	14–5 Fall	10–0
4	Dariga Aben (KAZ)	4	1	3	4	15	0–4 SU	0–4 SU	0–5 FA	—	10–0
5	Ariukhan Jumabaeva (UZB)	4	0	4	0	2	0–5 FA	0–5 FA	0–4 SU	0–4 SU	—

Source: UWW

=== 68 kg ===
21 April

Pos	Athlete	Pld	W	L	CP	TP	KGZ	KAZ	KOR
1	Meerim Zhumanazarova (KGZ)	2	2	0	7	15	—	5–0	10–0
2	Madina Bakbergenova (KAZ)	2	1	1	3	9	0–3 PO	—	9–0
3	Park Su-jin (KOR)	2	0	2	0	0	0–4 SU	0–3 PO	—

Source: UWW

Pos	Athlete	Pld	W	L	CP	TP	JPN	MGL	IND	UZB
1	Naruha Matsuyuki (JPN)	3	3	0	10	15	—	2–1	3–1	10–0
2	Enkhsaikhany Delgermaa (MGL)	3	2	1	9	22	1–3 PO1	—	10–0	11–0
3	Sonika Hooda (IND)	3	1	2	5	11	1–3 PO1	0–4 SU	—	10–0
4	Azoda Esbergenova (UZB)	3	0	3	0	0	0–4 SU	0–4 SU	0–4 SU	—

Source: UWW

Semifinals
Meerim Zhumanazarova (KGZ)	7
Enkhsaikhany Delgermaa (MGL)	2
Naruha Matsuyuki (JPN)	3
Madina Bakbergenova (KAZ)	3

Final
Meerim Zhumanazarova (KGZ)	2
Madina Bakbergenova (KAZ)	3
Bronze medal
Enkhsaikhany Delgermaa (MGL)	4
Naruha Matsuyuki (JPN)	0

=== 72 kg ===
22 April

Pos	Athlete	Pld	W	L	CP	TP	KAZ	JPN	MGL	IND	UZB
1	Zhamila Bakbergenova (KAZ)	4	4	0	13	27	—	4–4	3–3	7–0	13–2
2	Sumire Niikura (JPN)	4	3	1	13	32	1–3 PO1	—	6–6	12–1	10–0 Fall
3	Enkh-Amaryn Davaanasan (MGL)	4	2	2	10	18	1–3 PO1	1–3 PO1	—	5–2	4–2 Fall
4	Nikki Jatain (IND)	4	1	3	5	19	0–3 PO	1–4 SU1	1–3 PO1	—	16–7
5	Svetlana Oknazarova (UZB)	4	0	4	2	11	1–4 SU1	0–5 FA	0–5 FA	1–3 PO1	—

Source: UWW

=== 76 kg ===
21 April

Pos	Athlete	Pld	W	L	CP	TP	KGZ	JPN	IND
1	Aiperi Medet Kyzy (KGZ)	2	2	0	7	17	—	7–3	10–0
2	Yuka Kagami (JPN)	2	1	1	5	14	1–3 PO1	—	11–0
3	Sudesh Kumari (IND)	2	0	2	0	0	0–4 SU	0–4 SU	—

Source: UWW

Pos	Athlete	Pld	W	L	CP	TP	KAZ	MGL	UZB
1	Gulmaral Yerkebayeva (KAZ)	2	2	0	7	16	—	5–3	11–0
2	Ganbatyn Ariunjargal (MGL)	2	1	1	6	7	1–3 PO1	—	4–2 Fall
3	Valentina Toreniyazova (UZB)	2	0	2	0	2	0–4 SU	0–5 FA	—

Source: UWW

Semifinals
Aiperi Medet Kyzy (KGZ)	10
Ganbatyn Ariunjargal (MGL)	0
Gulmaral Yerkebayeva (KAZ)	0
Yuka Kagami (JPN)	11

Final
Aiperi Medet Kyzy (KGZ)	5
Yuka Kagami (JPN)	3
Bronze medal
Ganbatyn Ariunjargal (MGL)	4
Gulmaral Yerkebayeva (KAZ)	7
