= 2024 Vehbi Emre & Hamit Kaplan Tournament =

Vehbi Emre & Hamit Kaplan 2024
- Host city: Antalya, Turkey
- Dates: 7–8 March
- Stadium: Turgut Özal Sports Hall

Champions
- Greco-Roman: Iran

The 41st Vehbi Emre & Hamit Kaplan Tournament 2024 is a wrestling event was held in Antalya, Turkey, from 7 March to 8 June 2023 together with the 2024 Yasar Dogu Tournament.

This international tournament includes competition men's Greco-Roman wrestling. This ranking tournament is held in honor of the Olympic Champion, Hamit Kaplan and Turkish Wrestler and manager Vehbi Emre.

== Competition schedule ==
All times are (UTC+3)

Date	Time	Event
7 March	11.00-14.30	Qualification rounds & repechage GR – 55-63-72-82-97-130 kg & WW – 50-57-65-76 kg
7 March	17.00-19.00	Final matches and awarding ceremony: GR – 55-63-72-82-97-130 kg & WW – 50-57-65-76 kg
8 March	11.00-14.30	Qualification rounds & repechage GR – 60-67-77-87 kg & WW – 53-55-59-62-68-72 kg
8 March	17.00-19.00	Final matches and awarding ceremony: GR – 60-67-77-87 kg & WW – 53-55-59-62-68-72 kg
9 March	11.00-14.30	Qualification rounds & repechage FS – 57-65-74-86-97 kg
9 March	17.00-19.30	Final matches and awarding ceremony: Finals FS – 57-65-74-86-97 kg
10 March	11.00-14.30	Qualification rounds & repechage FS – 61-70-79-92-125 kg
10 March	17.00-19.30	Final matches and awarding ceremony: Finals FS – 61-70-79-92-125 kg

== Medal table ==
* Host nation (Turkey)

Rank	Nation	Gold	Silver	Bronze	Total
1	Iran	4	5	3	12
–	Individual Neutral Athletes	4	0	6	10
2	Kyrgyzstan	1	0	2	3
3	Finland	1	0	0	1
4	Georgia	0	2	0	2
5	Azerbaijan	0	1	1	2
5	Uzbekistan	0	1	1	2
7	Hungary	0	1	0	1
8	Turkey*	0	0	5	5
9	Kazakhstan	0	0	2	2
Totals (9 entries)		10	10	20	40

== Team ranking ==
Rank	Men's Greco-Roman	
Rank	Team	Points
1	Iran	166
2	Turkey	107
3	Kyrgyzstan	97
4	Georgia	72
5	Uzbekistan	66
6	Azerbaijan	51
7	Kazakhstan	48
8	Finland	25
9	Hungary	20
10	Japan	8

== Medal overview ==
=== Men's Greco-Roman ===
Event	Gold	Silver	Bronze
55 kg	Pouya Dadmarz; Iran	Giorgi Tokhadze; Georgia	Tural Mehtiyev; Azerbaijan
55 kg	Pouya Dadmarz; Iran	Giorgi Tokhadze; Georgia	Vitali Kabaloev; Individual Neutral Athletes
60 kg	Zholaman Sharshenbekov; Kyrgyzstan	Amir Reza Dehbozorgi; Iran	Mustafa Sağlam; Turkey
60 kg	Zholaman Sharshenbekov; Kyrgyzstan	Amir Reza Dehbozorgi; Iran	Meirambek Ainagulov; Kazakhstan
63 kg	Zhambolat Lokyaev; Individual Neutral Athletes	Ziya Babashov; Azerbaijan	Enes Başar; Turkey
63 kg	Zhambolat Lokyaev; Individual Neutral Athletes	Ziya Babashov; Azerbaijan	Aftandil Taalaibek Uulu; Kyrgyzstan
67 kg	Saeid Esmaeili; Iran	Makhmud Bakhshilloev; Uzbekistan	Maksim Nehoda; Individual Neutral Athletes
67 kg	Saeid Esmaeili; Iran	Makhmud Bakhshilloev; Uzbekistan	Abror Atabaev; Uzbekistan
72 kg	Dmitrii Adamov; Individual Neutral Athletes	Otar Abuladze; Georgia	Muhammed Ali Göçmen; Turkey
72 kg	Dmitrii Adamov; Individual Neutral Athletes	Otar Abuladze; Georgia	Imran Aliev; Individual Neutral Athletes
77 kg	Amin Kavianinejad; Iran	Ali Oskou; Iran	Amir Abdi; Iran
77 kg	Amin Kavianinejad; Iran	Ali Oskou; Iran	Tamerlan Shadukayev; Kazakhstan
82 kg	Stanislau Shafarenka; Individual Neutral Athletes	Rasoul Garmsiri; Iran	Veli Yılmaz; Turkey
82 kg	Stanislau Shafarenka; Individual Neutral Athletes	Rasoul Garmsiri; Iran	Abbas Mehdizadeh; Iran
87 kg	Milad Alirzaev; Individual Neutral Athletes	Dávid Losonczi; Hungary	Alperen Berber; Turkey
87 kg	Milad Alirzaev; Individual Neutral Athletes	Dávid Losonczi; Hungary	Vaag Margarian; Individual Neutral Athletes
97 kg	Mohammad Hadi Saravi; Iran	Mehdi Bali; Iran	Artur Sargsian; Individual Neutral Athletes
97 kg	Mohammad Hadi Saravi; Iran	Mehdi Bali; Iran	Uzur Dzhuzupbekov; Kyrgyzstan
130 kg	Elias Kuosmanen; Finland	Amin Mirzazadeh; Iran	Fardin Hedayati; Iran
130 kg	Elias Kuosmanen; Finland	Amin Mirzazadeh; Iran	Vitaly Shchur; Individual Neutral Athletes

== Participating nations ==
169 wrestlers from 13 countries:

1. Individual Neutral Athletes (23)
2. Azerbaijan (9)
3. Finland (3)
4. Georgia (9)
5. Hungary (3)
6. Iran (19)
7. Italy (1)
8. Japan (6)
9. Kazakhstan (15)
10. Kyrgyzstan (17)
11. Turkmenistan (3)
12. Turkey (48) (Host)
13. United States (1)
14. Uzbekistan (12)

== Results ==
Legend

- C — Won by 3 cautions given to the opponent
- DSQ — Disqualified
- F — Won by fall
- R — Retired
- WO — Won by walkover

=== Men's Greco-Roman 55 kg ===
Round of 16
Mizuki Araki (JPN)	7
Pouya Dadmarz (IRI)	12
Jasurbek Ortikboev (UZB)	8
Ömer Halis Recep (TUR)	0
Tural Mehtiyev (AZE)	6
Emre Mutlu (TUR)	4
Giorgi Tokhadze (GEO)	6
Engin Kuru (TUR)	1
Farid Sadikhli (AZE)	1
Vitali Kabaloev (AIN)	9

Quarterfinals
Ulan Muratbek Uulu (KGZ)	3
Pouya Dadmarz (IRI)	7
Jasurbek Ortikboev (UZB)	0
Tural Mehtiyev (AZE)	9
Muhammet Emin Çakır (TUR)	0
Giorgi Tokhadze (GEO)	9
Vitali Kabaloev (AIN)	5
Mohammad Hadi Shabani (IRI)	3

Semifinals
Pouya Dadmarz (IRI)	9
Tural Mehtiyev (AZE)	1
Giorgi Tokhadze (GEO)	11
Vitali Kabaloev (AIN)	4

Final
Pouya Dadmarz (IRI)	5
Giorgi Tokhadze (GEO)	2

Repechage round
Mizuki Araki (JPN)	5
Ulan Muratbek Uulu (KGZ)	17
Engin Kuru (TUR)	0
Muhammet Emin Çakır (TUR)	2

Bronze medal match
Ulan Muratbek Uulu (KGZ)	2
Tural Mehtiyev (AZE)	10
Muhammet Emin Çakır (TUR)	3
Vitali Kabaloev (AIN)	3

=== Men's Greco-Roman 60 kg ===
Final
Amir Reza Dehbozorgi (IRI)	0
Zholaman Sharshenbekov (KGZ)	5

Round of 32
Adem Uzun (TUR)	2
Galym Kabdunassarov (KAZ)	11
Elmir Aliyev (AZE)	7
Mohammad Mehdi Gholampour (IRI)	5

Round of 16
Mustafa Sağlam (TUR)	5
Taylor LaMont (USA)	3
Galym Kabdunassarov (KAZ)	11^{F}
Mehdi Mohsennejad (IRI)	7
Nihad Guluzade (AZE)	8
Elmir Aliyev (AZE)	3
Amir Reza Dehbozorgi (IRI)	7
Mert İlbars (TUR)	1

Quarterfinals
Mustafa Sağlam (TUR)	8
Galym Kabdunassarov (KAZ)	5
Nihad Guluzade (AZE)	1
Amir Reza Dehbozorgi (IRI)	1

Semifinals
Mustafa Sağlam (TUR)	1
Amir Reza Dehbozorgi (IRI)	3

Round of 32
Kazım Tikence (TUR)	0
Dastan Zarlykhanov (KAZ)	7
Ekrem Öztürk (TUR)	6
Ilkin Gurbanov (AZE)	5

Round of 16
Umit Durdyýew (TKM)	0
Mehroj Bahramov (UZB)	8
Dastan Zarlykhanov (KAZ)	6
Kemal Sevgili (TUR)	1
Servet Angı (TUR)	3
Ekrem Öztürk (TUR)	6
Zholaman Sharshenbekov (KGZ)	8
Meirambek Ainagulov (KAZ)	0

Quarterfinals
Mehroj Bahramov (UZB)	9
Dastan Zarlykhanov (KAZ)	5
Ekrem Öztürk (TUR)	0
Zholaman Sharshenbekov (KGZ)	9

Semifinals
Mehroj Bahramov (UZB)	0
Zholaman Sharshenbekov (KGZ)	8

Repechage round 2
Mert İlbars (TUR)	7
Nihad Guluzade (AZE)	1
Meirambek Ainagulov (KAZ)	9
Ekrem Öztürk (TUR)	0

Bronze medal match
Mert İlbars (TUR)	3
Mustafa Sağlam (TUR)	5
Meirambek Ainagulov (KAZ)	6^{C}
Mehroj Bahramov (UZB)	0

=== Men's Greco-Roman 63 kg ===
Round of 16
Dastan Kadyrov (KGZ)	1
Enes Başar (TUR)	7
Aftandil Taalaibek Uulu (KGZ)	13
Erhan Karakuş (TUR)	2

Quarterfinals
Ayhan Karakuş (TUR)	1
Enes Başar (TUR)	5
Hakan Kızılarslan (TUR)	1
Zhambolat Lokyaev (AIN)	9
Islomjon Bakhromov (UZB)	5
Anri Khozrevanidze (GEO)	8
Aftandil Taalaibek Uulu (KGZ)	1
Ziya Babashov (AZE)	3

Semifinals
Enes Başar (TUR)	2
Zhambolat Lokyaev (AIN)	4
Anri Khozrevanidze (GEO)	4
Ziya Babashov (AZE)	5

Final
Zhambolat Lokyaev (AIN)	3
Ziya Babashov (AZE)	3

Bronze medals
Hakan Kızılarslan (TUR)	0
Enes Başar (TUR)	8
Aftandil Taalaibek Uulu (KGZ)	10
Anri Khozrevanidze (GEO)	0

=== Men's Greco-Roman 67 kg ===
Final
Saeid Esmaeili (IRI)	1
Makhmud Bakhshilloev (UZB)	0^{R}

Round of 32
Aslan Visaitov (AIN)	3
Saeid Esmaeili (IRI)	4
Diego Chkhikvadze (GEO)	4
Joni Khetsuriani (GEO)	1
Aliaksandr Liavonchyk (AIN)	11
Dinmukhamed Koshkar (KAZ)	0

Round of 16
Serhat Kırık (TUR)	1
Maksim Nehoda (AIN)	7
Saeid Esmaeili (IRI)	7
Tynar Sharshenbekov (KGZ)	3
Röwşen Atdaýew (TKM)	1
Diego Chkhikvadze (GEO)	9
Aliaksandr Liavonchyk (AIN)	1
Azamat Akhmedov (AIN)	3

Quarterfinals
Maksim Nehoda (AIN)	0
Saeid Esmaeili (IRI)	8
Diego Chkhikvadze (GEO)	3
Azamat Akhmedov (AIN)	1

Semifinals
Saeid Esmaeili (IRI)	5
Diego Chkhikvadze (GEO)	1

Round of 32
Almatbek Amanbek (KAZ)	1
Almat Kebispayev (KAZ)	3
Abror Atabaev (UZB)	3
Mustafa Safa Yıldırım (TUR)	1
Razzak Beishekeev (KGZ)	1
Amantur Ismailov (KGZ)	1

Round of 16
Mohammad Javad Rezaei (IRI)	4
Almat Kebispayev (KAZ)	1
Abror Atabaev (UZB)	10
Abdullo Aliev (UZB)	5
Furkan Sonkur (TUR)	2
Razzak Beishekeev (KGZ)	10
Azat Sarıyar (TUR)	2
Makhmud Bakhshilloev (UZB)	4

Quarterfinals
Mohammad Javad Rezaei (IRI)	5
Abror Atabaev (UZB)	5
Razzak Beishekeev (KGZ)	3
Makhmud Bakhshilloev (UZB)	4

Semifinals
Abror Atabaev (UZB)	1
Makhmud Bakhshilloev (UZB)	3

Repechage round 1
Aslan Visaitov (AIN)	7
Tynar Sharshenbekov (KGZ)	3

Repechage round 2
Aslan Visaitov (AIN)	1
Maksim Nehoda (AIN)	3
Azat Sarıyar (TUR)	0
Razzak Beishekeev (KGZ)	12

Bronze medals
Maksim Nehoda (AIN)	6
Diego Chkhikvadze (GEO)	0
Razzak Beishekeev (KGZ)	1
Abror Atabaev (UZB)	1

=== Men's Greco-Roman 72 kg ===
Round of 16
Muhammed Ali Göçmen (TUR)	8
Krisztofer Klányi (HUN)	0
Irfan Hasanli (AZE)	11
Mehmet Duman (TUR)	3
Mustafa Şahin (TUR)	1
Adilkhan Nurlanbekov (KGZ)	5
Mohammad Reza Rostami (IRI)	3
Dmitrii Adamov (AIN)	5

Quarterfinals
Otar Abuladze (GEO)	3
Muhammed Ali Göçmen (TUR)	1
Irfan Hasanli (AZE)	3
Giorgi Chkhikvadze (GEO)	2^{F}
Ensar Karabacak (TUR)	5
Adilkhan Nurlanbekov (KGZ)	12
Dmitrii Adamov (AIN)	3
Imran Aliev (AIN)	1

Semifinals
Otar Abuladze (GEO)	2
Giorgi Chkhikvadze (GEO)	1
Adilkhan Nurlanbekov (KGZ)	0
Dmitrii Adamov (AIN)	8

Final
Otar Abuladze (GEO)	3
Dmitrii Adamov (AIN)	5

Repechage round
Mohammad Reza Rostami (IRI)	5
Imran Aliev (AIN)	7

Bronze medal match
Muhammed Ali Göçmen (TUR)	6
Giorgi Chkhikvadze (GEO)	1
Imran Aliev (AIN)	9
Adilkhan Nurlanbekov (KGZ)	1

=== Men's Greco-Roman 77 kg ===
- Iranian wrestler Mohammad Reza Mokhtari and Turkish wrestler Yüksel Sarıçiçek had several skirmishes and finally Mokhtari hit his opponent with his head eight seconds before the end of the match leading to a physical fight between themselves and involving Turkish coaching staff who assaulted Mokhtari. Both wrestlers were then disqualified, although Sarıçiçek was ahead 7 to 3. Quarterfinal losers Dilshod Omongeldiyev of Uzbekistan and Amin Kavianinejad of Iran played a semifinal match again.

Final
Amin Kavianinejad (IRI)	5
Ali Oskou (IRI)	0

Round of 32
Akzhol Makhmudov (KGZ)	5
Serkan Akkoyun (TUR)	1
Amin Kavianinejad (IRI)	2
Mehmet Can Daşdemir (TUR)	1
Tsimur Berdyieu (AIN)	1
Mohammad Reza Mokhtari (IRI)	3

Round of 16
Dilshod Omongeldiyev (UZB)	4
Jonni Sarkkinen (FIN)	1
Akzhol Makhmudov (KGZ)	1
Yüksel Sarıçiçek (TUR)	5
Amir Abdi (IRI)	1
Amin Kavianinejad (IRI)	4
Mohammad Reza Mokhtari (IRI)	3
Cengiz Arslan (TUR)	1

Quarterfinals
Dilshod Omongeldiyev (UZB)	3
Yüksel Sarıçiçek (TUR)	6
Amin Kavianinejad (IRI)	3
Mohammad Reza Mokhtari (IRI)	4

Semifinals
~~Yüksel Sarıçiçek (TUR)~~	7^{DSQ}
~~Mohammad Reza Mokhtari (IRI)~~	3^{DSQ}

Semifinal (Additional)
Dilshod Omongeldiyev (UZB)	1
Amin Kavianinejad (IRI)	1

Round of 32
Ahmet Altan (TUR)	0
Ali Oskou (IRI)	8^{F}
Róbert Fritsch (HUN)	5
Tamerlan Shadukayev (KAZ)	8
Aram Vardanyan (UZB)	1
Ibragim Magomadov (KAZ)	5

Round of 16
Shu Yamada (JPN)	2
Ali Oskou (IRI)	5
Tamerlan Shadukayev (KAZ)	7
Ismail Barakhoev (AIN)	3
Mikko Peltokangas (FIN)	1
Ibragim Magomadov (KAZ)	1
Pavel Liakh (AIN)	8
Abdiazim Karabaev (KAZ)	5

Quarterfinals
Ali Oskou (IRI)	6
Tamerlan Shadukayev (KAZ)	1
Ibragim Magomadov (KAZ)	3
Pavel Liakh (AIN)	1

Semifinals
Ali Oskou (IRI)	5
Ibragim Magomadov (KAZ)	4

Repechage round 1
Mehmet Can Daşdemir (TUR)	1
Amir Abdi (IRI)	5
Ahmet Altan (TUR)	3
Shu Yamada (JPN)	1

Repechage round 2
Amir Abdi (IRI)	WO
~~Mohammad Reza Mokhtari (IRI)~~	DSQ
Ahmet Altan (TUR)	0
Tamerlan Shadukayev (KAZ)	9

Bronze medals
Amir Abdi (IRI)	3
Dilshod Omongeldiyev (UZB)	2
Tamerlan Shadukayev (KAZ)	7
Ibragim Magomadov (KAZ)	0

=== Men's Greco-Roman 82 kg ===
Round of 16
Veli Yılmaz (TUR)	WO
Bekzat Orunkul Uulu (KGZ)
Abdul Samet Başar (TUR)	5
Reon Kakegawa (JPN)	1
Tunjay Vazirzade (AZE)	3
Abbas Mehdizadeh (IRI)	9
Rasoul Garmsiri (IRI)	WO
Yunus Emre Başar (TUR)

Quarterfinals
Stanislau Shafarenka (AIN)	3
Veli Yılmaz (TUR)	1
Abdul Samet Başar (TUR)	5
Ilya Bitseyeu (AIN)	3
Hasan Berk Kılınç (TUR)	3
Abbas Mehdizadeh (IRI)	12
Rasoul Garmsiri (IRI)	2
Tornike Dzamashvili (GEO)	1

Semifinals
Stanislau Shafarenka (AIN)	6
Abdul Samet Başar (TUR)	1
Abbas Mehdizadeh (IRI)	5
Rasoul Garmsiri (IRI)	8

Final
Stanislau Shafarenka (AIN)	6
Rasoul Garmsiri (IRI)	3

Repechage round
Yunus Emre Başar (TUR)	WO
Tornike Dzamashvili (GEO)

Bronze medal match
Veli Yılmaz (TUR)	WO
Abdul Samet Başar (TUR)
Yunus Emre Başar (TUR)
Abbas Mehdizadeh (IRI)	WO

=== Men's Greco-Roman 87 kg ===
Final
Milad Alirzaev (AIN)	WO
Dávid Losonczi (HUN)

Round of 32
Azamat Kustubayev (KAZ)	5
Ihar Yarashevich (AIN)	7

Round of 16
Lasha Gobadze (GEO)	3
Milad Alirzaev (AIN)	8
Ihar Yarashevich (AIN)	9^{F}
Daisei Isoe (JPN)	0
Azat Salidinov (KGZ)	4
Samet Yaldıran (TUR)	5
Alperen Berber (TUR)	3
Mohammad Hossein Mahmoodi (IRI)	2

Quarterfinals
Milad Alirzaev (AIN)	9
Ihar Yarashevich (AIN)	0
Samet Yaldıran (TUR)	2
Alperen Berber (TUR)	9

Semifinals
Milad Alirzaev (AIN)	11
Alperen Berber (TUR)	0

Round of 32
Melis Aitbekov (KGZ)	0
Dávid Losonczi (HUN)	9

Round of 16
Asan Zhanyshov (KGZ)	4
Doğan Kaya (TUR)	4^{F}
Vaag Margarian (AIN)	5
Lachin Valiyev (AZE)	3
Dias Kalen (KAZ)	1
Dávid Losonczi (HUN)	10
Jalgasbay Berdimuratov (UZB)	10^{F}
Atabek Azisbekov (KGZ)	1

Quarterfinals
Doğan Kaya (TUR)	1
Vaag Margarian (AIN)	7^{F}
Dávid Losonczi (HUN)	13
Jalgasbay Berdimuratov (UZB)	11

Semifinals
Vaag Margarian (AIN)	1
Dávid Losonczi (HUN)	4

Repechage round 1
Melis Aitbekov (KGZ)	4
Dias Kalen (KAZ)	5

Repechage round 2
Lasha Gobadze (GEO)	8
Ihar Yarashevich (AIN)	4
Dias Kalen (KAZ)	0
Jalgasbay Berdimuratov (UZB)	8

Bronze medals
Lasha Gobadze (GEO)	1
Alperen Berber (TUR)	9
Jalgasbay Berdimuratov (UZB)	3
Vaag Margarian (AIN)	8

=== Men's Greco-Roman 97 kg ===
Final
Mohammad Hadi Saravi (IRI)	6
Mehdi Bali (IRI)	1

Round of 32
Mohammad Hadi Saravi (IRI)	3
Doğan Yılmaz (TUR)	1
Muhittin Sarıçiçek (TUR)	3
Mustafa Olgun (TUR)	1
Beytullah Kayışdağ (TUR)	5
Said-Selim Bibulatov (AIN)	7
Beksultan Makhmudov (KGZ)	1
Doğan Göktaş (TUR)	3
Nikolai Khomenko (AIN)	9
Fatih Önvermez (TUR)	0

Round of 16
Artur Sargsian (AIN)	3
Mohammad Hadi Saravi (IRI)	4
Muhittin Sarıçiçek (TUR)	1
Said-Selim Bibulatov (AIN)	2
Yusuf Matsiyev (KAZ)	1
Doğan Göktaş (TUR)	3
Nikolai Khomenko (AIN)	10
Abdullah Arslan (TUR)	0

Quarterfinals
Mohammad Hadi Saravi (IRI)	2
Said-Selim Bibulatov (AIN)	1
Doğan Göktaş (TUR)	1
Nikolai Khomenko (AIN)	4

Semifinals
Mohammad Hadi Saravi (IRI)	7
Nikolai Khomenko (AIN)	6

Round of 32
Mehdi Bali (IRI)	12
Tansel Örtücü (TUR)	2
Amanberdi Agamämmedow (TKM)	0
Giorgi Melia (GEO)	9
Uzur Dzhuzupbekov (KGZ)	11
Abdikodir Jalilov (UZB)	1
Nikoloz Kakhelashvili (ITA)	1
Islam Umayev (KAZ)	1
Rustam Assakalov (UZB)	8
Kyo Kitawaki (JPN)	0
Metehan Başar (TUR)	WO
Ali Cengiz (TUR)

Round of 16
Yerulan Iskakov (KAZ)	1
Mehdi Bali (IRI)	5
Giorgi Melia (GEO)	3
Uzur Dzhuzupbekov (KGZ)	5
Nikoloz Kakhelashvili (ITA)	2
Rustam Assakalov (UZB)	1
Metehan Başar (TUR)	2
Uladzislau Pustashylau (AIN)	1

Quarterfinals
Mehdi Bali (IRI)	4
Uzur Dzhuzupbekov (KGZ)	1
Nikoloz Kakhelashvili (ITA)	1
Metehan Başar (TUR)	4

Semifinals
Mehdi Bali (IRI)	5
Metehan Başar (TUR)	2

Repechage round 1
Doğan Yılmaz (TUR)	0
Artur Sargsian (AIN)	9
Tansel Örtücü (TUR)	1
Yerulan Iskakov (KAZ)	7^{F}

Repechage round 2
Artur Sargsian (AIN)	3
Said-Selim Bibulatov (AIN)	1
Yerulan Iskakov (KAZ)	7
Uzur Dzhuzupbekov (KGZ)	8

Bronze medals
Artur Sargsian (AIN)	3
Nikolai Khomenko (AIN)	1
Uzur Dzhuzupbekov (KGZ)	3
Metehan Başar (TUR)	3

=== Men's Greco-Roman 130 kg ===
Round of 16
Koei Yamada (JPN)	1
Ali Nail Arslan (TUR)	9
Talip Çiftçi (TUR)	1
Roman Kim (KGZ)	3
Elias Kuosmanen (FIN)	5
Mansur Shadukayev (KAZ)	0
Temurbek Nasimov (UZB)	1
Pavel Hlinchuk (AIN)	9
Vitaly Shchur (AIN)	1
Amin Mirzazadeh (IRI)	5^{F}

Quarterfinals
Fardin Hedayati (IRI)	6
Ali Nail Arslan (TUR)	2
Roman Kim (KGZ)	0
Elias Kuosmanen (FIN)	8
Mikhail Laptev (AIN)	1
Pavel Hlinchuk (AIN)	2
Amin Mirzazadeh (IRI)	10
Burak Çakırca (TUR)	0

Semifinals
Fardin Hedayati (IRI)	3
Elias Kuosmanen (FIN)	4
Pavel Hlinchuk (AIN)	1
Amin Mirzazadeh (IRI)	4

Final
Elias Kuosmanen (FIN)	WO
Amin Mirzazadeh (IRI)

Repechage round
Mansur Shadukayev (KAZ)	8
Roman Kim (KGZ)	0
Vitaly Shchur (AIN)	10
Burak Çakırca (TUR)	1

Bronze medal match
Mansur Shadukayev (KAZ)
Fardin Hedayati (IRI)	WO
Vitaly Shchur (AIN)	1
Pavel Hlinchuk (AIN)	1
