= 2022 World Wrestling Championships – Men's Greco-Roman 87 kg =

Wrestling competitions

Men's Greco-Roman 87 kg at the 2022 World Championships
- Venue: Štark Arena
- Dates: 10–11 September 2022
- Competitors: 30 from 30 nations

Medalists
gold medal	Turpal Bisultanov	Denmark
silver medal	Dávid Losonczi	Hungary
bronze medal	Alex Kessidis	Sweden
bronze medal	Ali Cengiz	Turkey

The men's Greco-Roman 87 kilograms was a competition featured at the 2022 World Wrestling Championships, and was held in Belgrade, Serbia on 10 and 11 September 2022.

This Greco-Roman wrestling competition consisted of a single-elimination tournament, with a repechage used to determine the winner of two bronze medals. The two finalists faced off for gold and silver medals. Both wrestlers who lost to the two finalists moved into the repechage, culminating in a pair of bronze medal matches featuring the semifinal losers each facing the remaining repechage opponent from their half of the bracket.

On 21 November 2025, The Anti-doping Section of the Court of Arbitration for Sport ruled that the gold medalist Zurabi Datunashvili violated anti-doping rules by using a prohibited method and falsification and sentenced him to 5 years of ineligibility and disqualification of all results since 27 May 2021. Datunashvili's appeal was rejected by the Court of Arbitration for Sport and he was stripped of his medals.

== Results ==
Legend

- F — Won by fall
- WO — Won by walkover

=== Final ===
Final
Zurabi Datunashvili (SRB)	6
Turpal Bisultanov (DEN)	2

=== Top half ===
Round of 32
Vjekoslav Luburić (CRO)	1
Hannes Wagner (GER)	8
Masato Sumi (JPN)	2
Alex Kessidis (SWE)	12
Nurbek Khashimbekov (UZB)	0
Yoan Dimitrov (BUL)	5
Mohamed Metwally (EGY)	1
Kim Jin-hyeok (KOR)	3
Dávid Losonczi (HUN)	5
Nicu Ojog (ROU)	1
Alan Vera (USA)	3
Qian Haitao (CHN)	5
Szymon Szymonowicz (POL)	0
Nursultan Tursynov (KAZ)	9

Round of 16
Zurabi Datunashvili (SRB)	5
Hannes Wagner (GER)	0
Alex Kessidis (SWE)	5
Yoan Dimitrov (BUL)	1
Kim Jin-hyeok (KOR)	0
Dávid Losonczi (HUN)	10^{F}
Qian Haitao (CHN)	0
Nursultan Tursynov (KAZ)	8

Quarterfinals
Zurabi Datunashvili (SRB)	4
Alex Kessidis (SWE)	1
Dávid Losonczi (HUN)	13
Nursultan Tursynov (KAZ)	3

Semifinals
Zurabi Datunashvili (SRB)	4
Dávid Losonczi (HUN)	3

=== Bottom half ===
Round of 32
Bachir Sid Azara (ALG)	0
Damian von Euw (SUI)	8
Viorel Burduja (MDA)	5
Michael Wagner (AUT)	0
Roberti Kobliashvili (GEO)	2
Andriy Antoniuk (UKR)	4
Ali Cengiz (TUR)	1
Sunil Kumar (IND)	1
Atabek Azisbekov (KGZ)	10^{F}
Ronisson Brandão (BRA)	0
Mirco Minguzzi (ITA)	5
Nasser Alizadeh (IRI)	6
~~Alfonso Leyva (MEX)~~
Barthélémy Tshosha (COD)	WO

Round of 16
Damian von Euw (SUI)	6^{F}
Viorel Burduja (MDA)	0
Andriy Antoniuk (UKR)	1
Ali Cengiz (TUR)	3
Atabek Azisbekov (KGZ)	3
Nasser Alizadeh (IRI)	5
Barthélémy Tshosha (COD)	0
Turpal Bisultanov (DEN)	9

Quarterfinals
Damian von Euw (SUI)	3
Ali Cengiz (TUR)	8
Nasser Alizadeh (IRI)	1
Turpal Bisultanov (DEN)	2

Semifinals
Ali Cengiz (TUR)	0
Turpal Bisultanov (DEN)	6

=== Repechage ===
Repechage round 2
Hannes Wagner (GER)	1
Alex Kessidis (SWE)	6
Barthélémy Tshosha (COD)	0
Nasser Alizadeh (IRI)	9

Bronze medals
Alex Kessidis (SWE)	2
Dávid Losonczi (HUN)	6
Nasser Alizadeh (IRI)	1
Ali Cengiz (TUR)	7

== Final standing ==
Rank	Athlete
1st place, gold medalist(s)	Turpal Bisultanov (DEN)
2nd place, silver medalist(s)	Dávid Losonczi (HUN)
3rd place, bronze medalist(s)	Alex Kessidis (SWE)
3rd place, bronze medalist(s)	Ali Cengiz (TUR)
5	Nasser Alizadeh (IRI)
6	Damian von Euw (SUI)
7	Nursultan Tursynov (KAZ)
8	Atabek Azisbekov (KGZ)
9	Barthélémy Tshosha (COD)
10	Hannes Wagner (GER)
11	Yoan Dimitrov (BUL)
12	Andriy Antoniuk (UKR)
13	Viorel Burduja (MDA)
14	Qian Haitao (CHN)
15	Kim Jin-hyeok (KOR)
16	Mirco Minguzzi (ITA)
17	Alan Vera (USA)
18	Roberti Kobliashvili (GEO)
19	Masato Sumi (JPN)
20	Sunil Kumar (IND)
21	Mohamed Metwally (EGY)
22	Nicu Ojog (ROU)
23	Vjekoslav Luburić (CRO)
24	Nurbek Khashimbekov (UZB)
25	Michael Wagner (AUT)
26	Bachir Sid Azara (ALG)
27	Szymon Szymonowicz (POL)
28	Ronisson Brandão (BRA)
—	Alfonso Leyva (MEX)
DQ	Zurabi Datunashvili (SRB)

- Zurabi Datunashvili of Serbia originally won the gold medal, but was disqualified in 2025 for an anti-doping violation.
