= 2023 World Wrestling Championships – Men's Greco-Roman 87 kg =

Wrestling competitions

Men's Greco-Roman 87 kg at the 2023 World Championships
- Venue: Štark Arena
- Dates: 23–24 September 2023
- Competitors: 42 from 39 nations

Medalists
gold medal	Ali Cengiz	Turkey
gold medal	Dávid Losonczi	Hungary
bronze medal	Zhan Beleniuk	Ukraine
bronze medal	Semen Novikov	Bulgaria

The men's Greco-Roman 87 kilograms is a competition featured at the 2023 World Wrestling Championships, and was held in Belgrade, Serbia on 23 and 24 September 2023.

This freestyle wrestling competition consists of a single-elimination tournament, with a repechage used to determine the winner of two bronze medals. The two finalists face off for gold and silver medals. Each wrestler who loses to one of the two finalists moves into the repechage, culminating in a pair of bronze medal matches featuring the semifinal losers each facing the remaining repechage opponent from their half of the bracket.

== Results ==
Legend

- C — Won by 3 cautions given to the opponent
- F — Won by fall

=== Finals ===
Semifinals		Final
Ali Cengiz (TUR)	5^{F}
Nursultan Tursynov (KAZ)	3	Ali Cengiz (TUR)	8
Semen Novikov (BUL)	0	Dávid Losonczi (HUN)	7
Dávid Losonczi (HUN)	10

- During the final between Ali Cengiz and Dávid Losonczi, Losonczi pinned his opponent but that didn't confirmed by the referees. On 15 November 2023, the United World Wrestling recognized that a serious refereeing mistake had been committed which changed the outcome of this bout. Therefore, the UWW declared both wrestlers as the winners of the contest and award a gold medal to Dávid Losonczi.

=== Top half ===
==== Section 1 ====
Round of 64
Zac Braunagel (USA)	8
Azym Annamämmedow (TKM)	3
Luis Avendaño (VEN)	4
Lukas Staudacher (AUT)	2
Exauce Mukubu (NOR)	7
Milad Alirzaev (AIN)	1

Round of 32
Ali Cengiz (TUR)	7
Toni Metsomäki (FIN)	3
Zhan Beleniuk (UKR)	5
Zac Braunagel (USA)	1
Luis Avendaño (VEN)	0
Exauce Mukubu (NOR)	10
John Omondi (KEN)	0
Jalgasbay Berdimuratov (UZB)	8

Round of 16
Ali Cengiz (TUR)	3
Zhan Beleniuk (UKR)	1
Exauce Mukubu (NOR)	2
Jalgasbay Berdimuratov (UZB)	2

Quarterfinals
Ali Cengiz (TUR)	3
Jalgasbay Berdimuratov (UZB)	3

==== Section 2 ====
Round of 64
Manoj Kumar (UWW)	0
Park Sang-hyeok (KOR)	9
Arkadiusz Kułynycz (POL)	8
Ronisson Brandão (BRA)	0

Round of 32
Nursultan Tursynov (KAZ)	5
Mirco Minguzzi (ITA)	2
Daniel Vicente (MEX)	1
Park Sang-hyeok (KOR)	9
Arkadiusz Kułynycz (POL)	6
Marcel Sterkenburg (NED)	1
Ilias Pagkalidis (GRE)	4
Nasser Alizadeh (IRI)	6

Round of 16
Nursultan Tursynov (KAZ)	6
Park Sang-hyeok (KOR)	1
Arkadiusz Kułynycz (POL)	4
Nasser Alizadeh (IRI)	4

Quarterfinals
Nursultan Tursynov (KAZ)	9
Nasser Alizadeh (IRI)	4

=== Bottom half ===
==== Section 3 ====
Round of 64
Gevorg Tadevosyan (ARM)	5
Daniel Grégorich (CUB)	1
Sultan Ali Eid (JOR)	1
Lasha Gobadze (GEO)	8

Round of 32
Alex Kessidis (SWE)	5
Qian Haitao (CHN)	1
Martynas Nemsevičius (LTU)	0
Gevorg Tadevosyan (ARM)	10^{C}
Lasha Gobadze (GEO)	6
Ivan Huklek (CRO)	2
Mohamed Metwally (EGY)	0
Semen Novikov (BUL)	9

Round of 16
Alex Kessidis (SWE)	4^{F}
Gevorg Tadevosyan (ARM)	7
Lasha Gobadze (GEO)	1
Semen Novikov (BUL)	3

Quarterfinals
Alex Kessidis (SWE)	3
Semen Novikov (BUL)	5

==== Section 4 ====
Round of 64
Carlos Muñoz (COL)	0
Hannes Wagner (GER)	9
Masato Sumi (JPN)	2
Andreas Välis (EST)	0
Viorel Burduja (MDA)	1
Islam Abbasov (AZE)	5

Round of 32
Damian von Euw (SUI)	0
Kiryl Maskevich (AIN)	10
Hannes Wagner (GER)	1
Masato Sumi (JPN)	1
Islam Abbasov (AZE)	1
Bachir Sid Azara (ALG)	1
Azat Salidinov (KGZ)	0
Dávid Losonczi (HUN)	8

Round of 16
Kiryl Maskevich (AIN)	5
Hannes Wagner (GER)	3
Islam Abbasov (AZE)	0
Dávid Losonczi (HUN)	8

Quarterfinals
Kiryl Maskevich (AIN)	1
Dávid Losonczi (HUN)	6

=== Repechage ===
Repechage round 2
Toni Metsomäki (FIN)	1
Zhan Beleniuk (UKR)	5
Azat Salidinov (KGZ)	1
Islam Abbasov (AZE)	5

Repechage round 3
Zhan Beleniuk (UKR)	5
Jalgasbay Berdimuratov (UZB)	3
Islam Abbasov (AZE)	6
Kiryl Maskevich (AIN)	1

Bronze medals
Zhan Beleniuk (UKR)	7
Nursultan Tursynov (KAZ)	2
Islam Abbasov (AZE)	3
Semen Novikov (BUL)	6

Olympic wrestle-off
Nursultan Tursynov (KAZ)	8
Islam Abbasov (AZE)	0

== Final standing ==
Rank	Athlete
1st place, gold medalist(s)	Ali Cengiz (TUR)
1st place, gold medalist(s)	Dávid Losonczi (HUN)
3rd place, bronze medalist(s)	Zhan Beleniuk (UKR)
3rd place, bronze medalist(s)	Semen Novikov (BUL)
5	Nursultan Tursynov (KAZ)
5	Islam Abbasov (AZE)
7	Alex Kessidis (SWE)
8	Park Sang-hyeok (KOR)
9	Kiryl Maskevich (AIN)
10	Jalgasbay Berdimuratov (UZB)
11	Exauce Mukubu (NOR)
12	Arkadiusz Kułynycz (POL)
13	Hannes Wagner (GER)
14	Gevorg Tadevosyan (ARM)
15	Lasha Gobadze (GEO)
16	Nasser Alizadeh (IRI)
17	Zac Braunagel (USA)
18	Masato Sumi (JPN)
19	Luis Avendaño (VEN)
20	Toni Metsomäki (FIN)
21	Ilias Pagkalidis (GRE)
22	Azym Annamämmedow (TKM)
23	Lukas Staudacher (AUT)
24	Mirco Minguzzi (ITA)
25	Ivan Huklek (CRO)
26	Bachir Sid Azara (ALG)
27	Qian Haitao (CHN)
28	Daniel Grégorich (CUB)
29	Viorel Burduja (MDA)
30	Marcel Sterkenburg (NED)
31	Milad Alirzaev (AIN)
32	Sultan Ali Eid (JOR)
33	Daniel Vicente (MEX)
34	Azat Salidinov (KGZ)
35	Andreas Välis (EST)
36	John Omondi (KEN)
37	Ronisson Brandão (BRA)
38	Manoj Kumar (UWW)
39	Mohamed Metwally (EGY)
40	Carlos Muñoz (COL)
41	Damian von Euw (SUI)
42	Martynas Nemsevičius (LTU)

Qualified for the 2024 Summer Olympics
