= 2022 World Wrestling Championships – Men's Greco-Roman 55 kg =

Wrestling competitions

Men's Greco-Roman 55 kg at the 2022 World Championships
- Venue: Štark Arena
- Dates: 10–11 September 2022
- Competitors: 18 from 18 nations

Medalists
gold medal	Eldaniz Azizli	Azerbaijan
silver medal	Nugzari Tsurtsumia	Georgia
bronze medal	Yu Shiotani	Japan
bronze medal	Jasurbek Ortikboev	Uzbekistan

The men's Greco-Roman 55 kilograms is a competition featured at the 2022 World Wrestling Championships, and was held in Belgrade, Serbia on 10 and 11 September 2022.

This Greco-Roman wrestling competition consists of a single-elimination tournament, with a repechage used to determine the winner of two bronze medals. The two finalists face off for gold and silver medals. Each wrestler who loses to one of the two finalists moves into the repechage, culminating in a pair of bronze medal matches featuring the semifinal losers each facing the remaining repechage opponent from their half of the bracket.

== Results ==
Legend

- F — Won by fall

=== Final ===
Final
Eldaniz Azizli (AZE)	8
Nugzari Tsurtsumia (GEO)	0

=== Top half ===
Round of 32
Yu Shiotani (JPN)	8
Liu Jiahao (CHN)	0

Round of 16
Eldaniz Azizli (AZE)	8
Giovanni Freni (ITA)	0
Yu Shiotani (JPN)	9
Koriun Sahradian (UKR)	0
Fabian Schmitt (GER)	3
Artiom Deleanu (MDA)	2
Arjun Halakurki (IND)	3
Max Nowry (USA)	5^{F}

Quarterfinals
Eldaniz Azizli (AZE)	9
Yu Shiotani (JPN)	0
Fabian Schmitt (GER)	1
Max Nowry (USA)	5^{F}

Semifinals
Eldaniz Azizli (AZE)	9
Max Nowry (USA)	0

=== Bottom half ===
Round of 32
Rudik Mkrtchyan (ARM)	8
Jeon Hyeok-jin (KOR)	0

Round of 16
Ekrem Öztürk (TUR)	5
Pouya Dadmarz (IRI)	6
Nedyalko Petrov (BUL)	1
Amangali Bekbolatov (KAZ)	3
Jasurbek Ortikboev (UZB)	9
Rudik Mkrtchyan (ARM)	0
Mostafa Al-Qade (JOR)	0
Nugzari Tsurtsumia (GEO)	10

Quarterfinals
Pouya Dadmarz (IRI)	1
Amangali Bekbolatov (KAZ)	3
Jasurbek Ortikboev (UZB)	2
Nugzari Tsurtsumia (GEO)	5

Semifinals
Amangali Bekbolatov (KAZ)	3
Nugzari Tsurtsumia (GEO)	5

=== Repechage ===
Repechage round 2
Giovanni Freni (ITA)	0
Yu Shiotani (JPN)	9
Mostafa Al-Qade (JOR)	0
Jasurbek Ortikboev (UZB)	11

Bronze medals
Yu Shiotani (JPN)	7
Max Nowry (USA)	0
Jasurbek Ortikboev (UZB)	9
Amangali Bekbolatov (KAZ)	5

== Final standing ==
Rank	Athlete
1st place, gold medalist(s)	Eldaniz Azizli (AZE)
2nd place, silver medalist(s)	Nugzari Tsurtsumia (GEO)
3rd place, bronze medalist(s)	Yu Shiotani (JPN)
3rd place, bronze medalist(s)	Jasurbek Ortikboev (UZB)
5	Max Nowry (USA)
5	Amangali Bekbolatov (KAZ)
7	Rudik Mkrtchyan (ARM)
8	Pouya Dadmarz (IRI)
9	Fabian Schmitt (GER)
10	Ekrem Öztürk (TUR)
11	Artiom Deleanu (MDA)
12	Nedyalko Petrov (BUL)
13	Arjun Halakurki (IND)
14	Liu Jiahao (CHN)
15	Jeon Hyeok-jin (KOR)
16	Koriun Sahradian (UKR)
17	Giovanni Freni (ITA)
18	Mostafa Al-Qade (JOR)
