= Wrestling at the 2022 Asian Games – Men's Greco-Roman 87 kg =

Men's Greco-Roman 87 kg at the 2022 Asian Games
- Venue: Lin'an Sports and Culture Centre
- Date: 4 October 2023
- Competitors: 12 from 12 nations

Medalists
gold medal	Jalgasbay Berdimuratov	Uzbekistan
silver medal	Nasser Alizadeh	Iran
bronze medal	Sunil Kumar	India
bronze medal	Masato Sumi	Japan

The men's Greco-Roman 87 kilograms wrestling competition at the 2022 Asian Games in Hangzhou was held on 4 October 2023 at the Lin'an Sports and Culture Centre.

This Greco-Roman wrestling competition consists of a single-elimination tournament, with a repechage used to determine the winner of two bronze medals. The two finalists face off for gold and silver medals. Each wrestler who loses to one of the two finalists moves into the repechage, culminating in a pair of bronze medal matches featuring the semifinal losers each facing the remaining repechage opponent from their half of the bracket.

== Schedule ==
All times are China Standard Time (UTC+08:00)

Date	Time	Event
Wednesday, 4 October 2023	10:00	1/8 finals
Wednesday, 4 October 2023	10:00	1/4 finals
Wednesday, 4 October 2023	10:00	Semifinals
Wednesday, 4 October 2023	10:00	Repechages
Wednesday, 4 October 2023	17:00	Finals

== Results ==
=== Main bracket ===
1/8 finals
Atabek Azisbekov (KGZ)	1
Nasser Alizadeh (IRI)	7
Sunil Kumar (IND)	4
Peng Fei (CHN)	3
Shin Byeong-cheol (KOR)	1
Masato Sumi (JPN)	2
Nghiêm Đình Hiếu (VIE)	0
Maksat Sailau (KAZ)	11

1/4 finals
Azym Annamämmedow (TKM)	1
Nasser Alizadeh (IRI)	7
Sunil Kumar (IND)	9
Sukhrob Abdulkhaev (TJK)	1
Chhoeung Veasna (CAM)	0
Masato Sumi (JPN)	8
Maksat Sailau (KAZ)	0
Jalgasbay Berdimuratov (UZB)	11

Semifinals
Nasser Alizadeh (IRI)	5
Sunil Kumar (IND)	1
Masato Sumi (JPN)	1
Jalgasbay Berdimuratov (UZB)	3

Gold medal match
Nasser Alizadeh (IRI)	4
Jalgasbay Berdimuratov (UZB)	7

=== Repechage ===
Repechage round 1
Atabek Azisbekov (KGZ)	5
Azym Annamämmedow (TKM)	2

Bronze medal matches
Atabek Azisbekov (KGZ)	1
Sunil Kumar (IND)	2
Maksat Sailau (KAZ)	1
Masato Sumi (JPN)	9

== Final standing ==
Rank	Athlete
1st place, gold medalist(s)	Jalgasbay Berdimuratov (UZB)
2nd place, silver medalist(s)	Nasser Alizadeh (IRI)
3rd place, bronze medalist(s)	Sunil Kumar (IND)
3rd place, bronze medalist(s)	Masato Sumi (JPN)
5	Atabek Azisbekov (KGZ)
5	Maksat Sailau (KAZ)
7	Azym Annamämmedow (TKM)
8	Peng Fei (CHN)
9	Shin Byeong-cheol (KOR)
10	Sukhrob Abdulkhaev (TJK)
11	Chhoeung Veasna (CAM)
12	Nghiêm Đình Hiếu (VIE)
