= Ali Oskou =

Iranian Greco-Roman wrestler

Personal information
- Full name: Ali Oskou
- Nationality: Iran
- Born: 2 February 2001 (age 25) Amol, Mazandaran, Iran
- Height: 175 cm (5 ft 9 in)
- Weight: 77 kg (170 lb)

Sport
- Country: Iran
- Sport: Amateur wrestling
- Weight class: 77 kg
- Event: Greco-Roman
- Club: Fooladin Zob Amol
- Now coaching: Ghasem Rezaei; Hassan Hosseinzadeh
Medal record
Men's Greco-Roman wrestling
Representing Iran
World Championships
Bronze medal – third place	2026 Astana	77 kg
Asian Championships
Silver medal – second place	2026 Bishkek	77 kg
U23 World Championships
Bronze medal – third place	2024 Tirana	77 kg
Grand Prix
Gold medal – first place	2026 Zagreb	77 kg
Silver medal – second place	2024 Antalya	77 kg
Silver medal – second place	2024 Novosibirsk	77 kg

Ali Oskou (Persian: علی اسکو, born 2 February 2001) is an Iranian Greco-Roman wrestler competing in the 77 kg division.

== Career ==
He won the gold medal in the 77 kg event at the 2024 U23 World Wrestling Championships held in Tirana, Albania. He competed in his first world championship in the senior category in 2026 World Wrestling Championships held in Astana, Kazakhstan won a bronze medal.
