= 2022 U23 World Wrestling Championships – Men's Greco-Roman 63 kg =

Wrestling competitions

Men's Greco-Roman 63 kg at the 2022 U23 World Championships
- Venue: Pontevedra Municipal Sports Hall
- Dates: 17–18 October
- Competitors: 19 from 19 nations

Medalists
gold medal	Iman Mohammadi	Iran
silver medal	Giorgi Shotadze	Georgia
bronze medal	Ryuto Ikeda	Japan
bronze medal	Hrachya Poghosyan	Armenia

The men's Greco-Roman 63 kilograms is a competition featured at the 2022 U23 World Wrestling Championships, and was held in Pontevedra, Spain on 17 and 18 October 2022. The qualification rounds were held on 17 October while medal matches were held on the 2nd day of the competition. A total of 19 wrestlers competed in this event, limited to athletes whose body weight was less than 63 kilograms.

This Greco-Roman wrestling competition consists of a single-elimination tournament, with a repechage used to determine the winner of two bronze medals. The two finalists face off for gold and silver medals. Each wrestler who loses to one of the two finalists moves into the repechage, culminating in a pair of bronze medal matches featuring the semifinal losers each facing the remaining repechage opponent from their half of the bracket.

== Results ==
Legend

- F — Won by fall

=== Final ===
Final
Iman Mohammadi (IRI)	8
Giorgi Shotadze (GEO)	0

=== Top half ===
Round of 32
Ahmed Bagdouda (EGY)	6
Mason Carzino-Hartshorn (USA)	0

Round of 16
Ryuto Ikeda (JPN)	4
Krisztián Kecskeméti (HUN)	2
Ahmed Bagdouda (EGY)	1
Iman Mohammadi (IRI)	6
Andrea Setti (ITA)	0
Mustafa Safa Yıldırım (TUR)	9
Andy Juan (ESP)	0
Ziya Babashov (AZE)	9

Quarterfinals
Ryuto Ikeda (JPN)	1
Iman Mohammadi (IRI)	7
Mustafa Safa Yıldırım (TUR)	1
Ziya Babashov (AZE)	3

Semifinals
Iman Mohammadi (IRI)	5
Ziya Babashov (AZE)	1

=== Bottom half ===
Round of 32
Tino Ojala (FIN)	9
Maksym Liu (UKR)	14
Vitalie Eriomenco (MDA)	4
Yerzhet Zharlykassyn (KAZ)	0

Round of 16
Yonaiker Martínez (VEN)	0
Ermek Kanybek Uulu (KGZ)	9
Maksym Liu (UKR)	5
Ilia Mustakov (BUL)	1
Hrachya Poghosyan (ARM)	1
Vitalie Eriomenco (MDA)	1
Abere Fetene (ISR)	0
Giorgi Shotadze (GEO)	5

Quarterfinals
Ermek Kanybek Uulu (KGZ)	1
Maksym Liu (UKR)	5
Hrachya Poghosyan (ARM)	1
Giorgi Shotadze (GEO)	3

Semifinals
Maksym Liu (UKR)	2
Giorgi Shotadze (GEO)	5

=== Repechage ===
Repechage round 2
Ahmed Bagdouda (EGY)	11
Ryuto Ikeda (JPN)	12
Abere Fetene (ISR)	0
Hrachya Poghosyan (ARM)	9

Bronze medals
Ryuto Ikeda (JPN)	1
Ziya Babashov (AZE)	1
Hrachya Poghosyan (ARM)	3
Maksym Liu (UKR)	1

== Final standing ==
Rank	Athlete
1st place, gold medalist(s)	Iman Mohammadi (IRI)
2nd place, silver medalist(s)	Giorgi Shotadze (GEO)
3rd place, bronze medalist(s)	Ryuto Ikeda (JPN)
3rd place, bronze medalist(s)	Hrachya Poghosyan (ARM)
5	Ziya Babashov (AZE)
5	Maksym Liu (UKR)
7	Mustafa Safa Yıldırım (TUR)
8	Ermek Kanybek Uulu (KGZ)
9	Ahmed Bagdouda (EGY)
10	Vitalie Eriomenco (MDA)
11	Tino Ojala (FIN)
12	Krisztián Kecskeméti (HUN)
13	Ilia Mustakov (BUL)
14	Yerzhet Zharlykassyn (KAZ)
15	Mason Carzino-Hartshorn (USA)
16	Andrea Setti (ITA)
17	Andy Juan (ESP)
18	Yonaiker Martínez (VEN)
19	Abere Fetene (ISR)
