= Dávid Losonczi =

Hungarian Greco-Roman wrestler (born 2000)

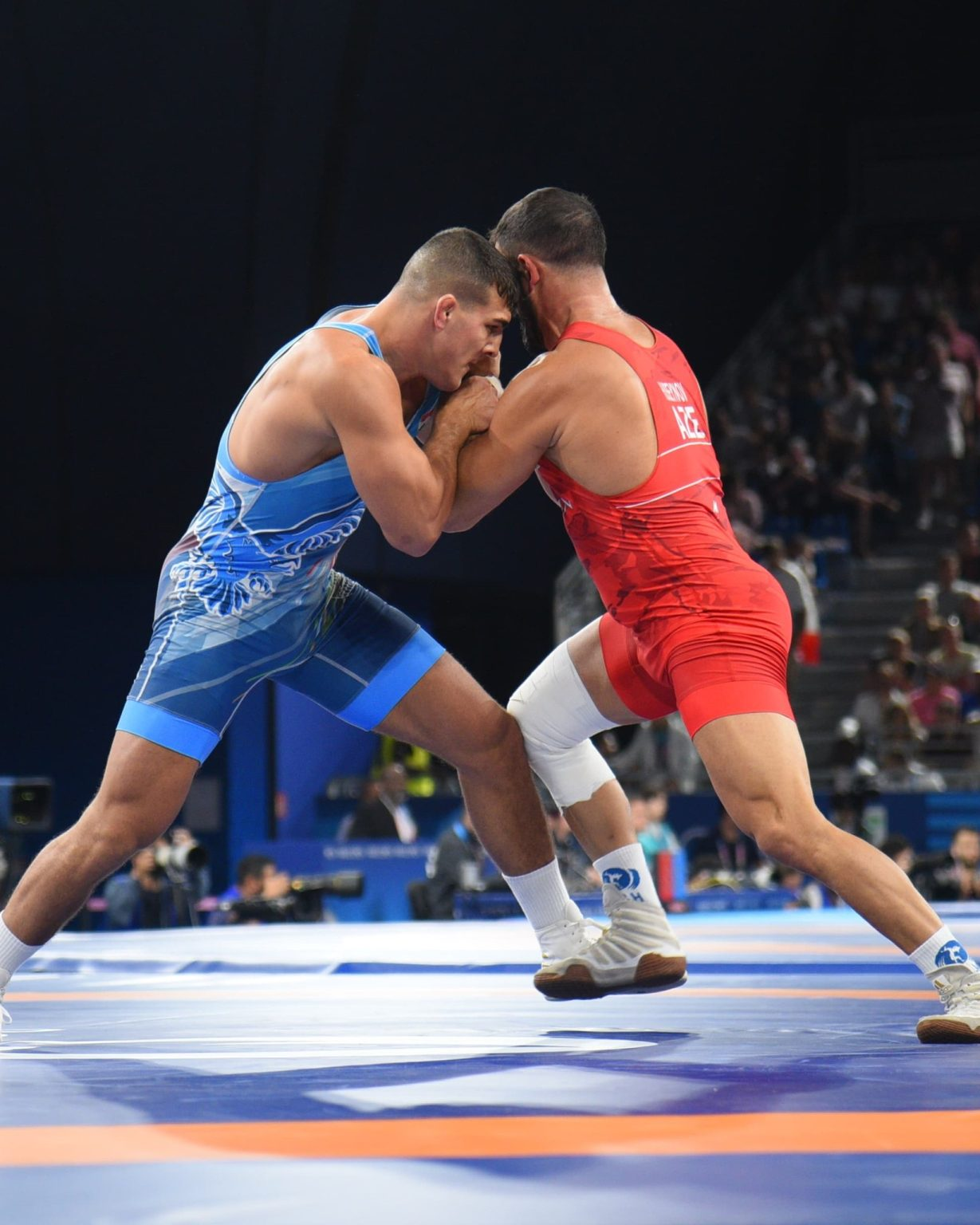

Personal information
- Born: 1 July 2000 (age 26) Hungary
- Height: 1.80 m (5 ft 11 in)
- Weight: 87 kg (192 lb)

Sport
- Country: Hungary
- Sport: Amateur wrestling
- Weight class: 87 kg
- Event: Greco-Roman
Medal record
Men's Greco-Roman wrestling
Representing Hungary
World Championships
Gold medal – first place	2023 Belgrade	87 kg
Silver medal – second place	2022 Belgrade	87 kg
European Championships
Gold medal – first place	2025 Bratislava	87 kg
Vehbi Emre & Hamit Kaplan Tournament
Gold medal – first place	2023 Istanbul	87 kg
Silver medal – second place	2024 Antalya	87 kg
Grand Prix
Gold medal – first place	2022 Warsaw	87 kg
Gold medal – first place	2022 Rome	97 kg
Gold medal – first place	2023 Budapest	87 kg
Silver medal – second place	2021 Rome	87 kg
Silver medal – second place	2024 Budapest	87 kg
Silver medal – second place	2025 Zagreb	87 kg
Silver medal – second place	2025 Tirana	87 kg
Silver medal – second place	2025 Budapest	87 kg
World U23 Championships
Silver medal – second place	2021 Belgrade	87 kg
European U23 Championship
Gold medal – first place	2023 Bucharest	87 kg
European Juniors Championships
Silver medal – second place	2019 Pontevedra	87 kg

Dávid Losonczi (born 1 July 2000) is a Hungarian Greco-Roman wrestler. He won the gold medal in the 87 kg event at the 2023 World Wrestling Championships held in Belgrade, Serbia.

== Wrestling career ==
Losonczi competed in the 2021 World Wrestling Championships for athletes under 23 years of age. He won the silver medal in the men's Greco-Roman 87 kg event after losing to Aleksandr Komarov in the finals.

He represented Hungary at the 2022 World Wrestling Championships, again competing in the 87 kg class. He reached the semi-final stage, in which he lost to Zurab Datunashvili, and subsequently won the bronze match against Alex Bjurberg Kessidis.

He won the silver medal at the 2023 World Wrestling Championships in Belgrade, Serbia, losing 8–7 to his Turkish rival Ali Cengiz in the men's Greco-Roman style 87 kilo final match. On 15 November 2023, the United World Wrestling recognized that a serious refereeing mistake had been committed which changed the outcome of this bout. Therefore, the UWW declared both wrestlers as the winners of the contest and award a gold medal to Dávid Losonczi. Dávid Losonczi defeated Kyrgyz Azat Salidinov 8–0 with a technical superiority in the second round, Azerbaijan's Islam Abbasov 8–0 with a technical superiority in the third round, and in the quarter-finals he defeated Belarusian Kiril Maskevic 6–1, who participated as an independent individual athlete, to reach the semi-finals. In the semi-final, he defeated Semen Novikov of Bulgaria with 10-0 technical superiority and reached the final.

He represented Hungary at the 2024 Summer Olympics in Paris, France. He lost his bronze medal match in the 87 kg event at the Olympics.
