= 2025 U23 World Wrestling Championships – Men's Greco-Roman 72 kg =

Wrestling competitions

Men's Greco-Roman 72 kg at the 2025 U23 World Championships
- Venue: SPC Vojvodina
- Dates: 21–22 October
- Competitors: 26 from 24 nations

Medalists
gold medal	Iman Mohammadi	Iran
silver medal	Abror Atabaev	Uzbekistan
bronze medal	Ruslan Nurullayev	Azerbaijan
bronze medal	Merey Maulitkanov	Kazakhstan

The men's Greco-Roman 72 kilograms is a competition featured at the 2025 U23 World Wrestling Championships, and was held in Novi Sad, Serbia on 21 and 22 October 2025.

This Greco-Roman wrestling competition consists of a single-elimination tournament, with a repechage used to determine the winner of two bronze medals. The two finalists face off for gold and silver medals. Each wrestler who loses to one of the two finalists moves into the repechage, culminating in a pair of bronze medal matches featuring the semifinal losers each facing the remaining repechage opponent from their half of the bracket.

== Results ==
Legend

- C — Won by 3 cautions given to the opponent
- F — Won by fall

=== Final ===
Final
Iman Mohammadi (IRI)	5
Abror Atabaev (UZB)	1

=== Top half ===
Round of 32
Iman Mohammadi (IRI)	6
Oleh Khalilov (UKR)	0
Ruslan Nurullayev (AZE)	8
Hajime Kikuta (JPN)	0
Jakub Šimčik (CZE)	3
Vasile Zabica (MDA)	10^{F}
Simon Borkenhagen (SWE)	0
Gaspar Terteryan (ARM)	2
Mihajlo Alempijević (SRB)	WO
~~Xhorxh Frrokaj (ALB)~~

Round of 16
Máté Végh (HUN)	4
Iman Mohammadi (IRI)	10
Ruslan Nurullayev (AZE)	4
Vasile Zabica (MDA)	0
Anil Dahiya (IND)	1
Gaspar Terteryan (ARM)	6
Mihajlo Alempijević (SRB)	0
Yryskeldi Khamzaev (KGZ)	9

Quarterfinals
Iman Mohammadi (IRI)	5
Ruslan Nurullayev (AZE)	3
Gaspar Terteryan (ARM)	5
Yryskeldi Khamzaev (KGZ)	3

Semifinals
Iman Mohammadi (IRI)	1
Gaspar Terteryan (ARM)	1

=== Bottom half ===
Round of 32
Artur Jeremejev (EST)	1
Sergey Stoev (BUL)	3
Eren Ülkü (TUR)	7
Viachaslau Zhehalau (UWW)	7
Aliaksandr Kikiniou (USA)	0
Danil Grigorev (UWW)	3
Haibier Waili (CHN)	1
Abror Atabaev (UZB)	9
Nika Broladze (GEO)	9
Leonard Iuraşcu (ROU)	3

Round of 16
Merey Maulitkanov (KAZ)	8
Sergey Stoev (BUL)	0
Eren Ülkü (TUR)	8^{C}
Jorge Gómez (MEX)	0
Danil Grigorev (UWW)	1
Abror Atabaev (UZB)	9
Nika Broladze (GEO)	5
Piotr Stolarczyk (POL)	2

Quarterfinals
Merey Maulitkanov (KAZ)	9
Eren Ülkü (TUR)	0
Abror Atabaev (UZB)	9
Nika Broladze (GEO)	0

Semifinals
Merey Maulitkanov (KAZ)	1
Abror Atabaev (UZB)	3

=== Repechage ===
Repechage round 1
Oleh Khalilov (UKR)	10
Máté Végh (HUN)	1
Haibier Waili (CHN)	0
Danil Grigorev (UWW)	10

Repechage round 2
Oleh Khalilov (UKR)	1
Ruslan Nurullayev (AZE)	3
Danil Grigorev (UWW)	2
Nika Broladze (GEO)	1

Bronze medals
Ruslan Nurullayev (AZE)	3
Gaspar Terteryan (ARM)	1
Danil Grigorev (UWW)	0
Merey Maulitkanov (KAZ)	10

== Final standing ==
Rank	Athlete
1st place, gold medalist(s)	Iman Mohammadi (IRI)
2nd place, silver medalist(s)	Abror Atabaev (UZB)
3rd place, bronze medalist(s)	Ruslan Nurullayev (AZE)
3rd place, bronze medalist(s)	Merey Maulitkanov (KAZ)
5	Gaspar Terteryan (ARM)
5	Danil Grigorev (UWW)
7	Eren Ülkü (TUR)
8	Nika Broladze (GEO)
9	Vasile Zabica (MDA)
10	Yryskeldi Khamzaev (KGZ)
11	Oleh Khalilov (UKR)
12	Mihajlo Alempijević (SRB)
13	Sergey Stoev (BUL)
14	Máté Végh (HUN)
15	Viachaslau Zhehalau (UWW)
16	Leonard Iuraşcu (ROU)
17	Piotr Stolarczyk (POL)
18	Artur Jeremejev (EST)
19	Anil Dahiya (IND)
20	Waili Haibier (CHN)
21	Jakub Šimčik (CZE)
22	Simon Borkenhagen (SWE)
23	Aliaksandr Kikiniou (USA)
24	Hajime Kikuta (JPN)
25	Jorge Gómez (MEX)
—	Xhorxh Frrokaj (ALB)
