= Amangali Bekbolatov =

Kazakhstani Greco-Roman wrestler

Sport
- Country: Kazakhstan
- Sport: Amateur wrestling
- Weight class: 55 kg
- Event: Greco-Roman
Medal record
Men's Greco-Roman wrestling
Representing Kazakhstan
Asian Championships
Silver medal – second place	2022 Ulaanbaatar	55 kg
Bronze medal – third place	2023 Astana	55 kg
Islamic Solidarity Games
Bronze medal – third place	2021 Konya	55 kg
World Military Championships
Gold medal – first place	2023 Baku	55 kg
Silver medal – second place	2018 Moscow	55 kg
Vehbi Emre & Hamit Kaplan Tournament
Silver medal – second place	2022 Istanbul	55 kg
Dan Kolov - Nikola Petrov Tournament
Bronze medal – third place	2019 Russe	55 kg
Grand Prix
Gold medal – first place	2020 Nice	55 kg
Gold medal – first place	2023 Alexandria	55 kg
Gold medal – first place	2023 Budapest	55 kg
Bronze medal – third place	2023 Bishkek	55 kg
Bronze medal – third place	2026 Zagreb	60 kg
World U23 Championships
Bronze medal – third place	2018 Bucharest	55 kg
World Juniors Championships
Bronze medal – third place	2015 Bahia	55 kg

Amangali Bekbolatov is a Kazakhstani Greco-Roman wrestler. He is a two-time medalist at the Asian Wrestling Championships. He also won a bronze medal at the 2021 Islamic Solidarity Games held in Konya, Turkey.

Bekbolatov lost his bronze medal match in the 55 kg event at the 2022 World Wrestling Championships held in Belgrade, Serbia. He won one of the bronze medals in his event at the 2023 Asian Wrestling Championships held in Astana, Kazakhstan.

== Achievements ==
Year	Tournament	Location	Result	Event
2022	Asian Championships	Ulaanbaatar, Mongolia	2nd	Greco-Roman 55 kg
2022	Islamic Solidarity Games	Konya, Turkey	3rd	Greco-Roman 55 kg
2023	Asian Championships	Astana, Kazakhstan	3rd	Greco-Roman 55 kg
