= Iman Mohammadi =

Iranian Greco-Roman wrestler

Personal information
- Native name: ایمان محمدی
- Nationality: Iranian
- Born: Izeh, Iran

Sport
- Country: Iran
- Sport: Greco-Roman wrestling
- Weight class: 63 kg
Medal record
Men's Greco-Roman wrestling
Representing Iran
Asian Championships
Gold medal – first place	2023 Astana	63 kg
Bronze medal – third place	2022 Ulaanbaatar	63 kg
Bronze medal – third place	2024 Bishkek	63 kg
World Cup
Gold medal – first place	2022 Baku	Team
World U23 Championships
Gold medal – first place	2022 Pontevedra	63 kg
Gold medal – first place	2025 Novi Sad	72 kg
World Junior Championship
Gold medal – first place	2022 Sofia	63 kg
Bronze medal – third place	2021 Ufa	63 kg
Asian Junior Championship
Gold medal – first place	2022 Manama	63 kg

Iman Mohammadi

Iman Mohammadi (Persian: ایمان محمدی) is an Iranian Greco-Roman wrestler.

In 2022, Mohammadi won a bronze medal in the 63 kg event at Asian Championships.

Mohammadi won gold medal at World U23 Wrestling Championships in category 63 kg.
