= 2024 U23 World Wrestling Championships – Men's Greco-Roman 77 kg =

Wrestling competitions

Men's Greco-Roman 77 kg at the 2024 U23 World Championships
- Venue: Tirana Olympic Park
- Dates: 22–23 October
- Competitors: 29 from 27 nations

Medalists
gold medal	Alexandrin Guțu	Moldova
silver medal	Samuel Bellscheidt	Germany
bronze medal	Ali Oskou	Iran
bronze medal	Khasay Hasanli	Azerbaijan

The men's Greco-Roman 77 kilograms is a competition featured at the 2024 U23 World Wrestling Championships, and was held in Tirana, Albania on 22 and 23 October 2024.

This Greco-Roman wrestling competition consists of a single-elimination tournament, with a repechage used to determine the winner of two bronze medals. The two finalists face off for gold and silver medals. Each wrestler who loses to one of the two finalists moves into the repechage, culminating in a pair of bronze medal matches featuring the semifinal losers each facing the remaining repechage opponent from their half of the bracket.

== Results ==
Legend

- F — Won by fall

=== Final ===
Final
Alexandrin Guțu (MDA)	3
Samuel Bellscheidt (GER)	1

=== Top half ===
Round of 32
Hassan Barnawi (KSA)	1
Frederik Mathiesen (DEN)	5
Klodjan Shehu (ALB)	0
Alexandrin Guțu (MDA)	11
Ali Oskou (IRI)	8
Simon Borkenhagen (SWE)	1
Doniyorkhon Nakibov (UZB)	8
Ludvig Gunheim-Hatland (NOR)	0
Karan (IND)	1
Hunter Garvin (USA)	9
Konrad Kozłowski (POL)	9
Chang Yang (CHN)	0
Attila Tösmagi (HUN)	1
Mykyta Politaiev (UKR)	1

Round of 16
Alonso Parra (COL)	6
Frederik Mathiesen (DEN)	0
Alexandrin Guțu (MDA)	9
Ali Oskou (IRI)	1
Doniyorkhon Nakibov (UZB)	7
Hunter Garvin (USA)	1
Konrad Kozłowski (POL)	1
Attila Tösmagi (HUN)	3

Quarterfinals
Alonso Parra (COL)	0
Alexandrin Guțu (MDA)	8
Doniyorkhon Nakibov (UZB)	9
Attila Tösmagi (HUN)	0

Semifinals
Alexandrin Guțu (MDA)	6
Doniyorkhon Nakibov (UZB)	1

=== Bottom half ===
Round of 32
Temirlan Karatay (KAZ)	6
Islam Barakhoev (AIN)	7
Khasay Hasanli (AZE)	2
Martik Petrosyan (ARM)	2
Ibrahim Tabaev (BEL)	3
Samuel Bellscheidt (GER)	11
Zakhar Yanevich (AIN)	1
Aleksa Ilić (SRB)	7
Ekke Leitham (EST)	13
Aryan Bin Azman (SGP)	4
Yüksel Sarıçiçek (TUR)	1
Temuri Orjonikidze (GEO)	4

Round of 16
Shu Yamada (JPN)	1
Islam Barakhoev (AIN)	7
Khasay Hasanli (AZE)	0
Samuel Bellscheidt (GER)	5
Aleksa Ilić (SRB)	6
Ekke Leitham (EST)	2
Temuri Orjonikidze (GEO)	10
Yryskeldi Maksatbek Uulu (KGZ)	0

Quarterfinals
Islam Barakhoev (AIN)	3
Samuel Bellscheidt (GER)	6
Aleksa Ilić (SRB)	1
Temuri Orjonikidze (GEO)	8

Semifinals
Samuel Bellscheidt (GER)	2
Temuri Orjonikidze (GEO)	1

=== Repechage ===
Repechage round 1
Klodjan Shehu (ALB)	0
Ali Oskou (IRI)	9
Ibrahim Tabaev (BEL)	2
Khasay Hasanli (AZE)	3

Repechage round 2
Ali Oskou (IRI)	10
Alonso Parra (COL)	0
Khasay Hasanli (AZE)	5
Islam Barakhoev (AIN)	3

Bronze medals
Ali Oskou (IRI)	6
Doniyorkhon Nakibov (UZB)	4
Khasay Hasanli (AZE)	7
Temuri Orjonikidze (GEO)	1

== Final standing ==
Rank	Athlete
1st place, gold medalist(s)	Alexandrin Guțu (MDA)
2nd place, silver medalist(s)	Samuel Bellscheidt (GER)
3rd place, bronze medalist(s)	Ali Oskou (IRI)
3rd place, bronze medalist(s)	Khasay Hasanli (AZE)
5	Doniyorkhon Nakibov (UZB)
5	Temuri Orjonikidze (GEO)
7	Islam Barakhoev (AIN)
8	Aleksa Ilić (SRB)
9	Attila Tösmagi (HUN)
10	Ekke Leitham (EST)
11	Konrad Kozłowski (POL)
12	Hunter Garvin (USA)
13	Alonso Parra (COL)
14	Frederik Mathiesen (DEN)
15	Ibrahim Tabaev (BEL)
16	Temirlan Karatay (KAZ)
17	Aryan Bin Azman (SGP)
18	Martik Petrosyan (ARM)
19	Mykyta Politaiev (UKR)
20	Yüksel Sarıçiçek (TUR)
21	Hassan Barnawi (KSA)
22	Shu Yamada (JPN)
23	Zakhar Yanevich (AIN)
24	Simon Borkenhagen (SWE)
25	Karan (IND)
26	Ludvig Gunheim-Hatland (NOR)
27	Chang Yang (CHN)
28	Yryskeldi Maksatbek Uulu (KGZ)
29	Klodjan Shehu (ALB)
