= Nasser Alizadeh =

Iranian Greco-Roman wrestler

Personal information
- Native name: ناصر علیزاده
- Full name: Naser Aizadeh
- Nationality: Iranian
- Born: 20 December 1998 (age 27) Chamestan, Mazandaran, Iran
- Website: Official Instagram Profile

Sport
- Country: Iran
- Sport: Greco-Roman wrestling
- Weight class: 87 kg
Medal record
Men's Greco-Roman wrestling
Representing Iran
Asian Games
Silver medal – second place	2022 Hangzhou	87 kg
Asian Championships
Gold medal – first place	2021 Almaty	87 kg
Gold medal – first place	2022 Ulaanbaatar	87 kg
Gold medal – first place	2023 Astana	87 kg
Gold medal – first place	2024 Bishkek	87 kg
World Military Championships
Gold medal – first place	2023 Baku	87 kg
World U23 Championships
Bronze medal – third place	2021 Belgrade	87 kg

Nasser Alizadeh (Persian: ناصر علیزاده, born 20 December 1998) is an Iranian Greco-Roman wrestler. He won the silver medal in the 87 kg event at the 2022 Asian Games held in Hangzhou, China.

Alizadeh won 4 Gold medals in the 87 kg event at Asian Championships in 2021, 2022, 2023 and 2024 .

Alizadeh placed fifth at 2022 World Wrestling Championships in category 87 kg.
