= Ölziisaikhany Batzul =

Mongolian freestyle wrestler

Personal information
- Native name: Өлзийсайханы Батзул
- Nationality: Mongolia
- Born: 1 August 1994 (age 32) Erdenet, Orkhon, Mongolia
- Height: 178 cm (5 ft 10 in)

Sport
- Country: Mongolia
- Sport: Wrestling
- Weight class: 97 kg
- Event: Freestyle

Achievements and titles
- World finals: 5th(2021)
- Regional finals: (silver) (2019) (silver) (2022)
Medal record
Men's freestyle wrestling
Representing Mongolia
Asian Championships
Silver medal – second place	2022 Ulaanbaatar	97 kg
Silver medal – second place	2019 Xi'an	97 kg
Takhti Cup
Bronze medal – third place	2018 Tabriz	92 kg

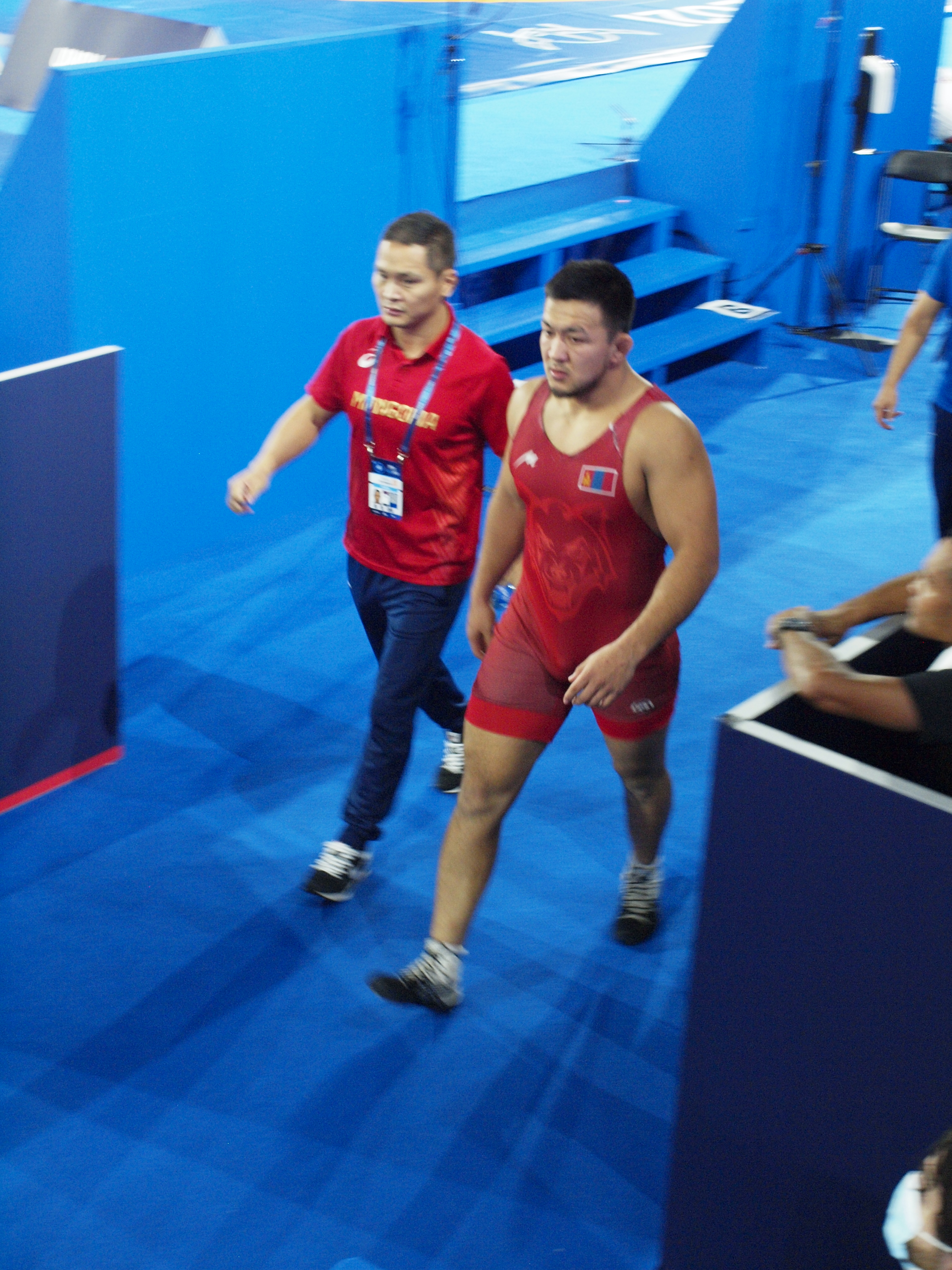

Ölziisaikhany Batzul (Mongolian: Өлзийсайханы Батзул; born 1 August 1994) is a Mongolian wrestler.

== Major results ==
Year	Competition	Venue	Position	Event	Notes
Representing Mongolia
2019	Asian Continental Championships	Xi'an, China	2nd	Freestyle 97 kg	
2022	Asian Continental Championship	Ulaanbaatar, Mongolia	2nd	Freestyle 97 kg	
