= Gourav Baliyan =

Indian freestyle wrestler (born 2001)

Personal information
- Born: 1 October 2001 (age 24) Shoron, Muzaffarnagar district, Uttar Pradesh, India

Sport
- Country: India
- Sport: Freestyle wrestling
- Event: 79 kg
Medal record
Men's freestyle wrestling
Representing India
Junior World Championships
| Bronze medal – third place | 2021 Ufa | 79 kg |
Asian Championships
| Silver medal – second place | 2020 New Delhi | 79 kg |
| Silver medal – second place | 2022 Ulaanbaatar | 79 kg |

Gourav Baliyan is an Indian freestyle wrestler. He won the silver medal at the 2020 Asian Wrestling Championships in the 79 kg category.
