= 2023 World Wrestling Championships – Men's Greco-Roman 55 kg =

Wrestling competitions

Men's Greco-Roman 55 kg at the 2023 World Championships
- Venue: Štark Arena
- Dates: 21–22 September 2023
- Competitors: 20 from 18 nations

Medalists
gold medal	Eldaniz Azizli	Azerbaijan
silver medal	Nugzari Tsurtsumia	Georgia
bronze medal	Pouya Dadmarz	Iran
bronze medal	Jasurbek Ortikboev	Uzbekistan

The men's Greco-Roman 55 kilograms is a competition featured at the 2023 World Wrestling Championships, and was held in Belgrade, Serbia on 21 and 22 September 2023.

This Greco-Roman wrestling competition consists of a single-elimination tournament, with a repechage used to determine the winner of two bronze medals. The two finalists face off for gold and silver medals. Each wrestler who loses to one of the two finalists moves into the repechage, culminating in a pair of bronze medal matches featuring the semifinal losers each facing the remaining repechage opponent from their half of the bracket.

== Results ==
Legend

- C — Won by 3 cautions given to the opponent
- F — Won by fall

=== Final ===
Final
Eldaniz Azizli (AZE)	13^{C}
Nugzari Tsurtsumia (GEO)	4

=== Top half ===
Round of 32
Koriun Sahradian (UKR)	7
Umit Durdyýew (TKM)	5
Adem Uzun (TUR)	8
Davies Oriwa (KEN)	0

Round of 16
Eldaniz Azizli (AZE)	3
Taiga Onishi (JPN)	1
Koriun Sahradian (UKR)	0
Marlan Mukashev (KAZ)	8
Rudik Mkrtchyan (ARM)	0
Adem Uzun (TUR)	8
Sabolč Lošonc (SRB)	0
Pouya Dadmarz (IRI)	8

Quarterfinals
Eldaniz Azizli (AZE)	6
Marlan Mukashev (KAZ)	0
Adem Uzun (TUR)	0
Pouya Dadmarz (IRI)	3

Semifinals
Eldaniz Azizli (AZE)	3
Pouya Dadmarz (IRI)	2

=== Bottom half ===
Round of 32
Jeon Hyeok-jin (KOR)	3
Brady Koontz (USA)	7
Hu Yunfei (CHN)	0
Vitali Kabaloev (AIN)	8

Round of 16
Jasurbek Ortikboev (UZB)	9
Ajay (UWW)	0
Brady Koontz (USA)	0
Denis Mihai (ROU)	9
Artiom Deleanu (MDA)	7
Vitali Kabaloev (AIN)	0
Mohamed Yacine Dridi (ALG)	2
Nugzari Tsurtsumia (GEO)	12

Quarterfinals
Jasurbek Ortikboev (UZB)	9
Denis Mihai (ROU)	0
Artiom Deleanu (MDA)	0
Nugzari Tsurtsumia (GEO)	10

Semifinals
Jasurbek Ortikboev (UZB)	4
Nugzari Tsurtsumia (GEO)	7

=== Repechage ===
Repechage round 2
Taiga Onishi (JPN)	0
Marlan Mukashev (KAZ)	9
Mohamed Yacine Dridi (ALG)	0
Artiom Deleanu (MDA)	4^{F}

Bronze medals
Marlan Mukashev (KAZ)	3
Pouya Dadmarz (IRI)	6
Artiom Deleanu (MDA)	1
Jasurbek Ortikboev (UZB)	6

== Final standing ==
Rank	Athlete
1st place, gold medalist(s)	Eldaniz Azizli (AZE)
2nd place, silver medalist(s)	Nugzari Tsurtsumia (GEO)
3rd place, bronze medalist(s)	Pouya Dadmarz (IRI)
3rd place, bronze medalist(s)	Jasurbek Ortikboev (UZB)
5	Marlan Mukashev (KAZ)
5	Artiom Deleanu (MDA)
7	Adem Uzun (TUR)
8	Denis Mihai (ROU)
9	Vitali Kabaloev (AIN)
10	Brady Koontz (USA)
11	Koriun Sahradian (UKR)
12	Umit Durdyýew (TKM)
13	Jeon Hyeok-jin (KOR)
14	Mohamed Yacine Dridi (ALG)
15	Taiga Onishi (JPN)
16	Rudik Mkrtchyan (ARM)
17	Davies Oriwa (KEN)
18	Sabolč Lošonc (SRB)
19	Hu Yunfei (CHN)
20	Ajay (UWW)
