= 2021 U23 World Wrestling Championships – Men's Greco-Roman 87 kg =

Greco-Roman event at World Wrestling Championship

The men's Greco-Roman 87 kilograms is a competition featured at the 2021 U23 World Wrestling Championships, and was held in Belgrade, Serbia on 1 and 2 November.

== Medalists ==
Gold	Aleksandr Komarov (RUS)
Silver	Dávid Losonczi (HUN)
Bronze	Szymon Szymonowicz (POL)
Bronze	Nasser Alizadeh (IRI)

== Results ==
Legend

- F — Won by fall
- R — Retired
- WO — Won by walkover

=== Final ===
Final
Dávid Losonczi (HUN)	0
Aleksandr Komarov (RUS)	9

=== Top half ===
Round of 32

Round of 16
Andreas Välis (EST)	1
Markus Sihtola (FIN)	1
Gabriel Lupașco (MDA)	0
Dávid Losonczi (HUN)	9
Ruben Been (NOR)	6
Simone Fidelbo (ITA)	1
Spencer Woods (USA)	0
Szymon Szymonowicz (POL)	4^{F}

Quarterfinals
Markus Sihtola (FIN)	2
Dávid Losonczi (HUN)	10
Ruben Been (NOR)	0
Szymon Szymonowicz (POL)	10

Semifinals
Dávid Losonczi (HUN)	6
Szymon Szymonowicz (POL)	0

=== Bottom half ===
Round of 32
Filip Smetko (CRO)	3
Sunil Kumar (IND)	6
Nasser Alizadeh (IRI)	1
Aleksandr Komarov (RUS)	3
Temuri Tchkuaselidze (GEO)	8
Gevorg Tadevosyan (ARM)	0
Illia Laurynovich (BLR)	4
Svetoslav Nikolov (BUL)	4^{F}
Vitalii Andriiovych (UKR)	2
Muhittin Sarıçiçek (TUR)	4
Mario Vuković (SRB)	8
Murad Ahmadiyev (AZE)	3

Round of 16
Azat Salidinov (KGZ)	0
Maksat Sailau (KAZ)	10
Sunil Kumar (IND)	2
Aleksandr Komarov (RUS)	6
Temuri Tchkuaselidze (GEO)	10
Svetoslav Nikolov (BUL)	1
Muhittin Sarıçiçek (TUR)	8
Mario Vuković (SRB)	0

Quarterfinals
Maksat Sailau (KAZ)	2
Aleksandr Komarov (RUS)	10
Temuri Tchkuaselidze (GEO)	8^{F}
Muhittin Sarıçiçek (TUR)	5

Semifinals
Aleksandr Komarov (RUS)	7
Temuri Tchkuaselidze (GEO)	7

=== Repechage ===
Repechage round 1
Nasser Alizadeh (IRI)	8
Sunil Kumar (IND)	0

Repechage round 2
Gabriel Lupașco (MDA)
Markus Sihtola (FIN)	WO
Nasser Alizadeh (IRI)	8
Maksat Sailau (KAZ)	0

Bronze medals
Markus Sihtola (FIN)	2^{R}
Szymon Szymonowicz (POL)	5
Nasser Alizadeh (IRI)	15
Temuri Tchkuaselidze (GEO)	7
