= 2022 Asian Wrestling Championships =

Wrestling competition in Ulaanbaatar, Mongolia

- Host city: Ulaanbaatar, Mongolia
- Dates: 19–24 April 2022
- Stadium: Buyant Ukhaa Sport Palace

Champions
- Freestyle: Iran
- Greco-Roman: Kazakhstan
- Women: Japan

The 2022 Asian Wrestling Championships was the 35th edition of Asian Wrestling Championships of combined events, and took place from April 19 to 24 in Ulaanbaatar, Mongolia.

== Medal table ==
Rank	Nation	Gold	Silver	Bronze	Total
1	Japan	10	2	9	21
2	Iran	10	2	3	15
3	Kazakhstan	5	8	8	21
4	Kyrgyzstan	4	3	7	14
5	India	1	5	11	17
6	Mongolia	0	6	6	12
7	Uzbekistan	0	2	6	8
8	South Korea	0	2	1	3
Totals (8 entries)		30	30	51	111

== Team ranking ==
Rank	Men's freestyle		Men's Greco-Roman		Women's freestyle	
Rank	Team	Points	Team	Points	Team	Points
1	Iran	201	Kazakhstan	190	Japan	227
2	India	152	Iran	176	Mongolia	167
3	Kazakhstan	151	Kyrgyzstan	148	Kazakhstan	142
4	Japan	140	Japan	134	India	137
5	Mongolia	115	Uzbekistan	123	Uzbekistan	107
6	Kyrgyzstan	104	India	113	Kyrgyzstan	65
7	Uzbekistan	100	South Korea	110	South Korea	47
8	South Korea	79	Mongolia	77	Singapore; Sri Lanka	8
9	Turkmenistan	46	Qatar; Singapore	10	Singapore; Sri Lanka	8
10	Bahrain	20	Qatar; Singapore	10		

== Medal summary ==
=== Men's freestyle ===
Event	Gold	Silver	Bronze
57 kg	Ravi Kumar Dahiya; India	Rakhat Kalzhan; Kazakhstan	Rikuto Arai; Japan
57 kg	Ravi Kumar Dahiya; India	Rakhat Kalzhan; Kazakhstan	Almaz Smanbekov; Kyrgyzstan
61 kg	Rei Higuchi; Japan	Dariush Hazratgholizadeh; Iran	Ulukbek Zholdoshbekov; Kyrgyzstan
61 kg	Rei Higuchi; Japan	Dariush Hazratgholizadeh; Iran	Akbar Kurbanov; Kazakhstan
65 kg	Rahman Amouzad; Iran	Bajrang Punia; India	Abbos Rakhmonov; Uzbekistan
65 kg	Rahman Amouzad; Iran	Bajrang Punia; India	Kaiki Yamaguchi; Japan
70 kg	Taishi Narikuni; Japan	Ernazar Akmataliev; Kyrgyzstan	Naveen Malik; India
70 kg	Taishi Narikuni; Japan	Ernazar Akmataliev; Kyrgyzstan	Syrbaz Talgat; Kazakhstan
74 kg	Younes Emami; Iran	Nurkozha Kaipanov; Kazakhstan	Daichi Takatani; Japan
74 kg	Younes Emami; Iran	Nurkozha Kaipanov; Kazakhstan	Islambek Orozbekov; Kyrgyzstan
79 kg	Ali Savadkouhi; Iran	Gourav Baliyan; India	Arsalan Budazhapov; Kyrgyzstan
79 kg	Ali Savadkouhi; Iran	Gourav Baliyan; India	Yudai Takahashi; Japan
86 kg	Azamat Dauletbekov; Kazakhstan	Deepak Punia; India	Bobur Islomov; Uzbekistan
86 kg	Azamat Dauletbekov; Kazakhstan	Deepak Punia; India	Mohsen Mostafavi; Iran
92 kg	Amir Hossein Firouzpour; Iran	Dagvadorjiin Orgilokh; Mongolia	Adilet Davlumbayev; Kazakhstan
92 kg	Amir Hossein Firouzpour; Iran	Dagvadorjiin Orgilokh; Mongolia	Vicky Chahar; India
97 kg	Mohammad Hossein Mohammadian; Iran	Ölziisaikhany Batzul; Mongolia	Mamed Ibragimov; Kazakhstan
97 kg	Mohammad Hossein Mohammadian; Iran	Ölziisaikhany Batzul; Mongolia	Satyawart Kadian; India
125 kg	Yadollah Mohebbi; Iran	Alisher Yergali; Kazakhstan	Jung Yei-hyun; South Korea
125 kg	Yadollah Mohebbi; Iran	Alisher Yergali; Kazakhstan	Enkhtüvshingiin Batmagnai; Mongolia

=== Men's Greco-Roman ===
Event	Gold	Silver	Bronze
55 kg	Yu Shiotani; Japan	Amangali Bekbolatov; Kazakhstan	Arjun Halakurki; India
55 kg	Yu Shiotani; Japan	Amangali Bekbolatov; Kazakhstan	Jasurbek Ortikboev; Uzbekistan
60 kg	Zholaman Sharshenbekov; Kyrgyzstan	Mehdi Mohsennejad; Iran	Yernur Fidakhmetov; Kazakhstan
60 kg	Zholaman Sharshenbekov; Kyrgyzstan	Mehdi Mohsennejad; Iran	Ayata Suzuki; Japan
63 kg	Tynar Sharshenbekov; Kyrgyzstan	Meirambek Ainagulov; Kazakhstan	Iman Mohammadi; Iran
63 kg	Tynar Sharshenbekov; Kyrgyzstan	Meirambek Ainagulov; Kazakhstan	Neeraj Chhikara; India
67 kg	Meirzhan Shermakhanbet; Kazakhstan	Ryu Han-su; South Korea	Katsuaki Endo; Japan
67 kg	Meirzhan Shermakhanbet; Kazakhstan	Ryu Han-su; South Korea	Sachin Sahrawat; India
72 kg	Mohammad Reza Mokhtari; Iran	Abylaikhan Amzeyev; Kazakhstan	Adilkhan Nurlanbekov; Kyrgyzstan
72 kg	Mohammad Reza Mokhtari; Iran	Abylaikhan Amzeyev; Kazakhstan	Shogo Takahashi; Japan
77 kg	Akzhol Makhmudov; Kyrgyzstan	Maxat Yerezhepov; Kazakhstan	Aref Habibollahi; Iran
77 kg	Akzhol Makhmudov; Kyrgyzstan	Maxat Yerezhepov; Kazakhstan	Kodai Sakuraba; Japan
82 kg	Rasoul Garmsiri; Iran	Dias Kalen; Kazakhstan	Mukhammadkodir Rasulov; Uzbekistan
82 kg	Rasoul Garmsiri; Iran	Dias Kalen; Kazakhstan	Harpreet Singh Sandhu; India
87 kg	Nasser Alizadeh; Iran	Jalgasbay Berdimuratov; Uzbekistan	Nursultan Tursynov; Kazakhstan
87 kg	Nasser Alizadeh; Iran	Jalgasbay Berdimuratov; Uzbekistan	Sunil Kumar; India
97 kg	Mehdi Bali; Iran	Rustam Assakalov; Uzbekistan	Takahiro Tsuruda; Japan
97 kg	Mehdi Bali; Iran	Rustam Assakalov; Uzbekistan	Uzur Dzhuzupbekov; Kyrgyzstan
130 kg	Alimkhan Syzdykov; Kazakhstan	Kim Min-seok; South Korea	Muminjon Abdullaev; Uzbekistan
130 kg	Alimkhan Syzdykov; Kazakhstan	Kim Min-seok; South Korea	Roman Kim; Kyrgyzstan

=== Women's freestyle ===
Event	Gold	Silver	Bronze
50 kg	Remina Yoshimoto; Japan	Tsogt-Ochiryn Namuuntsetseg; Mongolia	Jasmina Immaeva; Uzbekistan
50 kg	Remina Yoshimoto; Japan	Tsogt-Ochiryn Namuuntsetseg; Mongolia	None awarded
53 kg	Akari Fujinami; Japan	Batkhuyagiin Khulan; Mongolia	Zhuldyz Eshimova; Kazakhstan
53 kg	Akari Fujinami; Japan	Batkhuyagiin Khulan; Mongolia	None awarded
55 kg	Umi Imai; Japan	Ganbaataryn Otgonjargal; Mongolia	Sushma Shokeen; India
55 kg	Umi Imai; Japan	Ganbaataryn Otgonjargal; Mongolia	None awarded
57 kg	Tsugumi Sakurai; Japan	Anshu Malik; India	Khürelkhüügiin Bolortuyaa; Mongolia
57 kg	Tsugumi Sakurai; Japan	Anshu Malik; India	None awarded
59 kg	Sara Natami; Japan	Baatarjavyn Shoovdor; Mongolia	Sarita Mor; India
59 kg	Sara Natami; Japan	Baatarjavyn Shoovdor; Mongolia	None awarded
62 kg	Nonoka Ozaki; Japan	Aisuluu Tynybekova; Kyrgyzstan	Boldsaikhan Khongorzul; Mongolia
62 kg	Nonoka Ozaki; Japan	Aisuluu Tynybekova; Kyrgyzstan	Manisha Bhanwala; India
65 kg	Miwa Morikawa; Japan	Radhika Jaglan; India	Ölziisaikhany Pürevsüren; Mongolia
65 kg	Miwa Morikawa; Japan	Radhika Jaglan; India	None awarded
68 kg	Madina Bakbergenova; Kazakhstan	Meerim Zhumanazarova; Kyrgyzstan	Enkhsaikhany Delgermaa; Mongolia
68 kg	Madina Bakbergenova; Kazakhstan	Meerim Zhumanazarova; Kyrgyzstan	None awarded
72 kg	Zhamila Bakbergenova; Kazakhstan	Sumire Niikura; Japan	Enkh-Amaryn Davaanasan; Mongolia
72 kg	Zhamila Bakbergenova; Kazakhstan	Sumire Niikura; Japan	None awarded
76 kg	Aiperi Medet Kyzy; Kyrgyzstan	Yuka Kagami; Japan	Gulmaral Yerkebayeva; Kazakhstan
76 kg	Aiperi Medet Kyzy; Kyrgyzstan	Yuka Kagami; Japan	None awarded

== Participating nations ==
250 competitors from 19 nations competed.

- Bahrain (2)
- India (30)
- Iran (20)
- Japan (30)
- Jordan (2)
- Kazakhstan (30)
- Kuwait (4)
- Kyrgyzstan (21)
- Mongolia (30)
- Pakistan (3)
- Palestine (1)
- Qatar (1)
- Singapore (4)
- South Korea (25)
- Sri Lanka (4)
- Syria (2)
- Tajikistan (3)
- Turkmenistan (8)
- Uzbekistan (30)
