= Yu Shiotani =

Japanese Greco-Roman wrestler

Personal information
- Nationality: Japan
- Born: 塩谷優; 27 October 2001 (age 24) Tokyo, Japan
- Height: 158 cm (5 ft 2 in)

Sport
- Country: Japan
- Sport: Amateur wrestling
- Weight class: 55 kg
- Event: Greco-Roman
Medal record
Men's Greco-Roman wrestling
Representing Japan
World Championships
Bronze medal – third place	2022 Belgrade	55 kg
Asian Championships
Gold medal – first place	2021 Almaty	55 kg
Gold medal – first place	2022 Ulaanbaatar	55 kg
Wladyslaw Pytlasinski Cup
Gold medal – first place	2022 Warsaw	55 kg

Yu Shiotani (born 27 October 2001) is a Japanese Greco-Roman wrestler. He won one of the bronze medals in the 55 kg event at the 2022 World Wrestling Championships held in Belgrade, Serbia.

He won the gold medal in the 55 kg event at the 2021 Asian Wrestling Championships held in Almaty, Kazakhstan. He also won the gold medal in his event at the 2022 Asian Wrestling Championships held in Ulaanbaatar, Mongolia.

== Achievements ==
Year	Tournament	Location	Result	Event
2021	Asian Championships	Almaty, Kazakhstan	1st	Greco-Roman 55 kg
2022	Asian Championships	Ulaanbaatar, Mongolia	1st	Greco-Roman 55 kg
2022	World Championships	Belgrade, Serbia	3rd	Greco-Roman 55 kg
