= Boldsaikhan Khongorzul =

Mongolian freestyle wrestler

Personal information
- Native name: Болдсайханы Хонгорзул
- Nationality: Mongolia
- Born: 27 May 2001 (age 25) Bayankhongor, Ölziit, Mongolia

Sport
- Country: Mongolia
- Sport: Amateur wrestling
- Weight class: 62 kg
- Event: Freestyle
- Coached by: Sovd Munkhduuldakh

Achievements and titles
- Olympic finals: 5th(2020)
- Regional finals: (bronze) (2022)
Medal record
Women's freestyle wrestling
Representing Mongolia
Asian Championships
Bronze medal – third place	2022 Ulaanbaatar	62 kg
Golden Grand Prix Ivan Yarygin
Gold medal – first place	2023 Krasnoyarsk	62 kg
Bronze medal – third place	2020 Krasnoyarsk	57 kg
Olympic Qualification Tournament
Gold medal – first place	2021 Sofia	57 kg
Asian U23 Championships
Gold medal – first place	2019 Ulaanbaatar	57 kg
World Cadets Championships
Bronze medal – third place	2017 Athens	52 kg
Asian Cadets Championships
Silver medal – second place	2017 Bangkok	52 kg
Bronze medal – third place	2018 Tashkent	57 kg

Boldsaikhan Khongorzul (Mongolian: Болдсайханы Хонгорзул; born 27 May 2001) is a Mongolian freestyle wrestler. In 2019, she won the gold medal in the 57 kg event at the 2019 Asian U23 Wrestling Championship held in Ulaanbaatar, Mongolia. She also qualified to represent Mongolia at the 2020 Summer Olympics in Tokyo, Japan.

She competed in the women's 57 kg event at the 2024 Summer Olympics in Paris, France.
