= Atabek Azisbekov =

Kyrgyz Greco-Roman wrestler

Personal information
- Nationality: Kyrgyz
- Born: 6 November 1995 (age 30)

Sport
- Sport: Wrestling
- Event: Greco-Roman
Medal record
Men's Greco-Roman wrestling
Representing Kyrgyzstan
Asian Championships
Silver medal – second place	2015 Doha	75 kg
Silver medal – second place	2018 Bishkek	82 kg
Silver medal – second place	2021 Almaty	87 kg
Bolat Turlykhanov Cup
Bronze medal – third place	2022 Almaty	87 kg
- Updated on 5 July 2021

Atabek Azisbekov (born 6 November 1995) is a Kyrgyz Greco-Roman wrestler. He is two time Asian Championships silver medalist

He represented Kyrgyzstan at the 2020 Summer Olympics in the men's Greco-Roman 87 kg weight class.

He competed in the 87 kg event at the 2022 World Wrestling Championships held in Belgrade, Serbia.

== Major results ==
Year	Tournament	Venue	Result	Event
2013	Universiade	Kazan, Russia	19th	Greco-Roman 74 kg
2015	Asian Championships	Doha, Qatar	2nd	Greco-Roman 75 kg
2015	World Championships	Las Vegas, United States	11th	Greco-Roman 75 kg
2016	World Championships	Budapest, Hungary	21st	Greco-Roman 80 kg
2017	Islamic Solidarity Games	Baku, Azerbaijan	5th	Greco-Roman 80 kg
2017	Asian Indoor and Martial Arts Games	Ashgabat, Turkmenistan	2nd	Greco-Roman 80 kg
2018	Asian Championships	Bishkek, Kyrgyzstan	2nd	Greco-Roman 82 kg
2018	World Championships	Budapest, Hungary	5th	Greco-Roman 82 kg
2019	Asian Championships	Xi'an, China	8th	Greco-Roman 87 kg
2019	World Championships	Nur-Sultan, Kazakhstan	5th	Greco-Roman 87 kg
2021	Asian Championships	Almaty, Kazakhstan	2nd	Greco-Roman 87 kg
2021	Olympic Games	Tokyo, Japan	10th	Greco-Roman 87 kg
