= Jasurbek Ortikboev =

Uzbekistani Greco-Roman wrestler

Personal information
- Nationality: Uzbekistan
- Height: 160 cm (5 ft 3 in)

Sport
- Country: Uzbekistan
- Sport: Amateur wrestling
- Weight class: 55 kg
- Event: Greco-Roman
Medal record
Men's Greco-Roman wrestling
Representing Uzbekistan
World Championships
Bronze medal – third place	2022 Belgrade	55 kg
Bronze medal – third place	2023 Belgrade	55 kg
Asian Championships
Silver medal – second place	2020 New Delhi	55 kg
Bronze medal – third place	2022 Ulaanbaatar	55 kg
Islamic Solidarity Games
Silver medal – second place	2021 Konya	55 kg
Grand Prix Zagreb Open
Gold medal – first place	2021 Zagreb	55 kg
Bolat Turlykhanov Cup
Silver medal – second place	2022 Almaty	55 kg
Asian Juniors Championships
Bronze medal – third place	2017 Taichung	50 kg
Asian Cadets Championships
Bronze medal – third place	2014 Bangkok	42 kg

Jasurbek Ortikboev is an Uzbekistani Greco-Roman wrestler. He is a two-time bronze medalist in the 55 kg event at the World Wrestling Championships. He is also a two-time medalist at the Asian Wrestling Championships.

== Career ==
In 2020, Ortikboev won the silver medal in the 55 kg event at the Asian Wrestling Championships held in New Delhi, India. In 2021, he won the gold medal in the 55 kg event at the Grand Prix Zagreb Open held in Zagreb, Croatia.

Ortikboev won one of the bronze medals in his event at the 2022 Asian Wrestling Championships held in Ulaanbaatar, Mongolia. He won the silver medal in his event at the 2021 Islamic Solidarity Games held in Konya, Turkey.

He won one of the bronze medals in the 55 kg event at the 2022 World Wrestling Championships held in Belgrade, Serbia. He also won one of the bronze medals in the 55 kg event at the 2023 World Wrestling Championships held in Belgrade, Serbia.

== Achievements ==
Year	Tournament	Location	Result	Event
2020	Asian Championships	New Delhi, India	2nd	Greco-Roman 55 kg
2022	Asian Championships	Ulaanbaatar, Mongolia	3rd	Greco-Roman 55 kg
2022	Islamic Solidarity Games	Konya, Turkey	2nd	Greco-Roman 55 kg
2022	World Championships	Belgrade, Serbia	3rd	Greco-Roman 55 kg
2023	World Championships	Belgrade, Serbia	3rd	Greco-Roman 55 kg
