= 2022 World Wrestling Championships =

17th edition of the World Wrestling Championships combined events

- Host city: Belgrade, Serbia
- Dates: 10–18 September 2022
- Stadium: Štark Arena

Champions
- Freestyle: United States
- Greco-Roman: Turkey
- Women: Japan

The 2022 World Wrestling Championships was the 17th edition of the World Wrestling Championships of combined events and was held between 10 and 18 September 2022 in Belgrade, Serbia.

The UWW Bureau approved the bidding of Belgrade, Serbia as the host of the 2023 Senior World Championships. However, due to the restrictions on Russia for hosting World Championships in 2021–2022, Belgrade replaced the former city of Krasnoyarsk as the World Championships host for 2022. In addition, Russian and Belarusian athletes have been banned from 2022 World Championships.

== Medal table ==
Rank	Nation	Gold	Silver	Bronze	Total
1	United States	7	6	2	15
2	Japan	7	1	5	13
3	Turkey	4	0	4	8
4	Serbia	3	0	1	4
5	Iran	2	5	3	10
6	Kyrgyzstan	2	0	3	5
7	Azerbaijan	1	1	5	7
8	Armenia	1	0	2	3
9	Moldova	1	0	1	2
10	Albania	1	0	0	1
10	Denmark	1	0	0	1
12	Mongolia	0	3	2	5
13	Georgia	0	2	4	6
14	Hungary	0	2	2	4
15	Slovakia	0	2	1	3
16	Bulgaria	0	2	0	2
17	Ukraine	0	1	5	6
18	China	0	1	3	4
19	Kazakhstan	0	1	2	3
20	Uzbekistan	0	1	1	2
21	Egypt	0	1	0	1
21	Norway	0	1	0	1
23	Poland	0	0	3	3
24	Canada	0	0	2	2
24	India	0	0	2	2
24	Romania	0	0	2	2
27	Estonia	0	0	1	1
27	France	0	0	1	1
27	Greece	0	0	1	1
27	Lithuania	0	0	1	1
27	Sweden	0	0	1	1
Totals (31 entries)		30	30	60	120

== Team ranking ==
Rank	Men's freestyle		Men's Greco-Roman		Women's freestyle	
Rank	Team	Points	Team	Points	Team	Points
1	United States	198	Turkey	125	Japan	190
2	Iran	150	Azerbaijan	118	United States	157
3	Japan	72	Serbia	85	China	84
4	Mongolia	70	Iran	81	Mongolia	72
5	Georgia	68	Kyrgyzstan	79	Ukraine	68
6	Slovakia	55	Georgia	76	Canada	58
7	Turkey	52	Hungary	75	Moldova	50
8	Azerbaijan	42	Uzbekistan	61	Poland	49
9	Bulgaria	42	Armenia	58	India	41
10	India	37	Kazakhstan	53	Turkey	39

== Medal summary ==
=== Men's freestyle ===
Event	Gold	Silver	Bronze
57 kg	Zelimkhan Abakarov; Albania	Thomas Gilman; United States	Zandanbudyn Zanabazar; Mongolia
57 kg	Zelimkhan Abakarov; Albania	Thomas Gilman; United States	Stevan Mićić; Serbia
61 kg	Rei Higuchi; Japan	Reza Atri; Iran	Arsen Harutyunyan; Armenia
61 kg	Rei Higuchi; Japan	Reza Atri; Iran	Narmandakhyn Narankhüü; Mongolia
65 kg	Rahman Amouzad; Iran	Yianni Diakomihalis; United States	Iszmail Muszukajev; Hungary
65 kg	Rahman Amouzad; Iran	Yianni Diakomihalis; United States	Bajrang Punia; India
70 kg	Taishi Narikuni; Japan	Zain Retherford; United States	Ernazar Akmataliev; Kyrgyzstan
70 kg	Taishi Narikuni; Japan	Zain Retherford; United States	Zurabi Iakobishvili; Georgia
74 kg	Kyle Dake; United States	Tajmuraz Salkazanov; Slovakia	Younes Emami; Iran
74 kg	Kyle Dake; United States	Tajmuraz Salkazanov; Slovakia	Soner Demirtaş; Turkey
79 kg	Jordan Burroughs; United States	Mohammad Nokhodi; Iran	Arsalan Budazhapov; Kyrgyzstan
79 kg	Jordan Burroughs; United States	Mohammad Nokhodi; Iran	Vasyl Mykhailov; Ukraine
86 kg	David Taylor; United States	Hassan Yazdani; Iran	Boris Makoev; Slovakia
86 kg	David Taylor; United States	Hassan Yazdani; Iran	Azamat Dauletbekov; Kazakhstan
92 kg	Kamran Ghasempour; Iran	J'den Cox; United States	Miriani Maisuradze; Georgia
92 kg	Kamran Ghasempour; Iran	J'den Cox; United States	Osman Nurmagomedov; Azerbaijan
97 kg	Kyle Snyder; United States	Batyrbek Tsakulov; Slovakia	Magomedkhan Magomedov; Azerbaijan
97 kg	Kyle Snyder; United States	Batyrbek Tsakulov; Slovakia	Givi Matcharashvili; Georgia
125 kg	Taha Akgül; Turkey	Mönkhtöriin Lkhagvagerel; Mongolia	Geno Petriashvili; Georgia
125 kg	Taha Akgül; Turkey	Mönkhtöriin Lkhagvagerel; Mongolia	Amir Hossein Zare; Iran

=== Men's Greco-Roman ===
Event	Gold	Silver	Bronze
55 kg	Eldaniz Azizli; Azerbaijan	Nugzari Tsurtsumia; Georgia	Yu Shiotani; Japan
55 kg	Eldaniz Azizli; Azerbaijan	Nugzari Tsurtsumia; Georgia	Jasurbek Ortikboev; Uzbekistan
60 kg	Zholaman Sharshenbekov; Kyrgyzstan	Edmond Nazaryan; Bulgaria	Aidos Sultangali; Kazakhstan
60 kg	Zholaman Sharshenbekov; Kyrgyzstan	Edmond Nazaryan; Bulgaria	Kenichiro Fumita; Japan
63 kg	Sebastian Nađ; Serbia	Leri Abuladze; Georgia	Tuo Erbatu; China
63 kg	Sebastian Nađ; Serbia	Leri Abuladze; Georgia	Taleh Mammadov; Azerbaijan
67 kg	Mate Nemeš; Serbia	Mohammad Reza Geraei; Iran	Amantur Ismailov; Kyrgyzstan
67 kg	Mate Nemeš; Serbia	Mohammad Reza Geraei; Iran	Hasrat Jafarov; Azerbaijan
72 kg	Ali Arsalan; Serbia	Ulvu Ganizade; Azerbaijan	Andrii Kulyk; Ukraine
72 kg	Ali Arsalan; Serbia	Ulvu Ganizade; Azerbaijan	Selçuk Can; Turkey
77 kg	Akzhol Makhmudov; Kyrgyzstan	Zoltán Lévai; Hungary	Malkhas Amoyan; Armenia
77 kg	Akzhol Makhmudov; Kyrgyzstan	Zoltán Lévai; Hungary	Yunus Emre Başar; Turkey
82 kg	Burhan Akbudak; Turkey	Jalgasbay Berdimuratov; Uzbekistan	Tamás Lévai; Hungary
82 kg	Burhan Akbudak; Turkey	Jalgasbay Berdimuratov; Uzbekistan	Yaroslav Filchakov; Ukraine
87 kg	Turpal Bisultanov; Denmark	Dávid Losonczi; Hungary	Alex Kessidis; Sweden
87 kg	Turpal Bisultanov; Denmark	Dávid Losonczi; Hungary	Ali Cengiz; Turkey
97 kg	Artur Aleksanyan; Armenia	Kiril Milov; Bulgaria	Mohammad Hadi Saravi; Iran
97 kg	Artur Aleksanyan; Armenia	Kiril Milov; Bulgaria	Arif Niftullayev; Azerbaijan
130 kg	Rıza Kayaalp; Turkey	Amin Mirzazadeh; Iran	Mantas Knystautas; Lithuania
130 kg	Rıza Kayaalp; Turkey	Amin Mirzazadeh; Iran	Alin Alexuc-Ciurariu; Romania

=== Women's freestyle ===
Event	Gold	Silver	Bronze
50 kg	Yui Susaki; Japan	Dolgorjavyn Otgonjargal; Mongolia	Sarah Hildebrandt; United States
50 kg	Yui Susaki; Japan	Dolgorjavyn Otgonjargal; Mongolia	Anna Łukasiak; Poland
53 kg	Dominique Parrish; United States	Batkhuyagiin Khulan; Mongolia	Vinesh Phogat; India
53 kg	Dominique Parrish; United States	Batkhuyagiin Khulan; Mongolia	Maria Prevolaraki; Greece
55 kg	Mayu Shidochi; Japan	Oleksandra Khomenets; Ukraine	Xie Mengyu; China
55 kg	Mayu Shidochi; Japan	Oleksandra Khomenets; Ukraine	Karla Godinez; Canada
57 kg	Tsugumi Sakurai; Japan	Helen Maroulis; United States	Anhelina Lysak; Poland
57 kg	Tsugumi Sakurai; Japan	Helen Maroulis; United States	Alina Hrushyna; Ukraine
59 kg	Anastasia Nichita; Moldova	Grace Bullen; Norway	Jowita Wrzesień; Poland
59 kg	Anastasia Nichita; Moldova	Grace Bullen; Norway	Sakura Motoki; Japan
62 kg	Nonoka Ozaki; Japan	Kayla Miracle; United States	Ilona Prokopevniuk; Ukraine
62 kg	Nonoka Ozaki; Japan	Kayla Miracle; United States	Luo Xiaojuan; China
65 kg	Miwa Morikawa; Japan	Long Jia; China	Mallory Velte; United States
65 kg	Miwa Morikawa; Japan	Long Jia; China	Koumba Larroque; France
68 kg	Tamyra Mensah-Stock; United States	Ami Ishii; Japan	Linda Morais; Canada
68 kg	Tamyra Mensah-Stock; United States	Ami Ishii; Japan	Irina Rîngaci; Moldova
72 kg	Amit Elor; United States	Zhamila Bakbergenova; Kazakhstan	Alexandra Anghel; Romania
72 kg	Amit Elor; United States	Zhamila Bakbergenova; Kazakhstan	Masako Furuichi; Japan
76 kg	Yasemin Adar Yiğit; Turkey	Samar Amer; Egypt	Yuka Kagami; Japan
76 kg	Yasemin Adar Yiğit; Turkey	Samar Amer; Egypt	Epp Mäe; Estonia

== Participating nations ==
743 competitors from 75 nations and a refugee team (under UWW name) participated:

- Albania (2)
- Algeria (4)
- Argentina (3)
- Armenia (14)
- Australia (2)
- Austria (4)
- Azerbaijan (24)
- Brazil (11)
- Bulgaria (20)
- Canada (20)
- Cape Verde (1)
- Chad (1)
- Chile (3)
- China (29)
- Colombia (4)
- Congo (1)
- Congo DR (7)
- Costa Rica (1)
- Croatia (5)
- Cuba (12)
- Czech Republic (5)
- Denmark (3)
- Ecuador (3)
- Egypt (6)
- Estonia (5)
- Finland (3)
- France (15)
- Georgia (20)
- Germany (23)
- Ghana (1)
- Greece (3)
- Guatemala (5)
- Guinea-Bissau (3)
- Hungary (19)
- India (30)
- Iran (20)
- Israel (5)
- Italy (13)
- Ivory Coast (4)
- Japan (29)
- Jordan (2)
- Kazakhstan (30)
- Kenya (1)
- Kyrgyzstan (15)
- Latvia (3)
- Lithuania (9)
- Mauritius (1)
- Mexico (12)
- Moldova (18)
- Mongolia (20)
- Nigeria (3)
- North Macedonia (5)
- Norway (5)
- Palestine (1)
- Poland (20)
- Portugal (1)
- Puerto Rico (5)
- Romania (15)
- San Marino (2)
- Serbia (12)
- Slovakia (6)
- South Africa (2)
- South Korea (25)
- Spain (4)
- Sweden (7)
- Switzerland (6)
- Syria (1)
- Tajikistan (2)
- Tunisia (1)
- Turkey (30)
- Turkmenistan (3)
- Ukraine (30)
- United States (30)
- United World Wrestling (1)
- Uzbekistan (25)
- Vietnam (7)
