= Zhan Beleniuk =

Ukrainian Greco-Roman wrestler (born 1991)

- Жан Беленюк
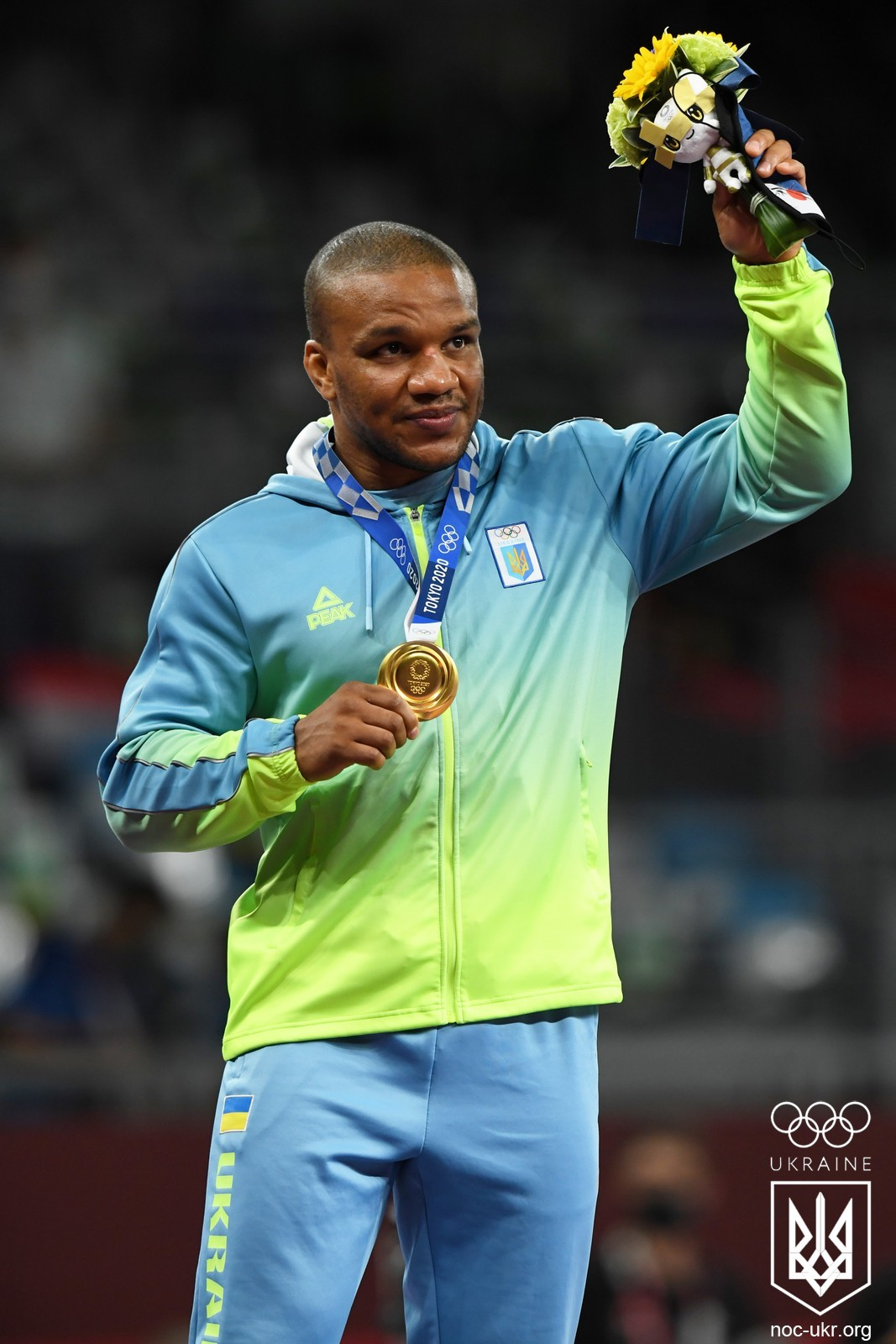
- Beleniuk with his gold medal at the 2020 Summer Olympics

Member of the Ukrainian Parliament
- Incumbent
- Assumed office 29 August 2019

Personal details
- Born: 24 January 1991 (age 35) Kyiv, Ukrainian SSR, Soviet Union
- Party: Servant of the People
- Sports career
- Full name: Zhan Vensanovych Beleniuk
- Nationality: Ukrainian
- Height: 1.75 m (5 ft 9 in)
- Weight: 85 kg (187 lb)
- Sport: Wrestling
- Event: Greco-Roman
- Club: Spartak Kyiv
- Coached by: Vitalyj Kisilisa; Aleksej Dobrovolskyj; Oleg Sazonov
- Retired: yes
Medal record
Men's Greco-Roman wrestling
Representing Ukraine
Event	1st	2nd	3rd
Olympic Games	1	1	1
World Championships	2	1	2
European Championships	3	0	3
European Games	1	1	0
Summer Universiade	0	0	1
Military Games	1	0	0
Total	8	3	7
Olympic Games
Gold medal – first place	2020 Tokyo	87 kg
Silver medal – second place	2016 Rio de Janeiro	85 kg
Bronze medal – third place	2024 Paris	87 kg
World Championships
Gold medal – first place	2015 Las Vegas	85 kg
Gold medal – first place	2019 Nur-Sultan	87 kg
Silver medal – second place	2018 Budapest	87 kg
Bronze medal – third place	2014 Tashkent	85 kg
Bronze medal – third place	2023 Belgrade	87 kg
European Championships
Gold medal – first place	2014 Vantaa	85 kg
Gold medal – first place	2016 Riga	85 kg
Gold medal – first place	2019 Bucharest	87 kg
Bronze medal – third place	2012 Belgrade	84 kg
Bronze medal – third place	2021 Warsaw	87 kg
Bronze medal – third place	2024 Bucharest	87 kg
European Games
Gold medal – first place	2019 Minsk	87 kg
Silver medal – second place	2015 Baku	85 kg
Summer Universiade
Bronze medal – third place	2013 Kazan	84 kg
Military Games
Gold medal – first place	2015 Mungyeong	85 kg

Zhan Vensanovych Beleniuk (Note: Also transliterated Jean Vensanovich Belenyuk) (Ukrainian: Жан Венсанович Беленюк; born 24 January 1991) is a Ukrainian politician and Greco-Roman wrestler. He is a three-time Olympic medalist and won the gold medal in the Greco-Roman 87 kg at the 2020 Summer Olympics, the silver medal in the Greco-Roman 85 kg at the 2016 Summer Olympics and a bronze medal in the Greco-Roman 87 kg at the 2024 Summer Olympics. Beleniuk is also a two-time world champion, a three-time European champion and a European Games champion. In 2019, he became the first black member of the Ukrainian Parliament.

== Early life ==
Beleniuk was born in 1991 in Kyiv to a father from Rwanda and a mother from Ukraine. His father, a Rwandan Hutu, was a pilot who studied in Kyiv at the National Aviation University and died during the Rwandan Civil War when Beleniuk was 3 years old.

Beleniuk began wrestling in 2000 when he was nine years old.

== Career ==
In 2010, Beleniuk won the silver medal at the Junior World Championships. In 2011, he became the Junior European Champion amongst, and won bronze at the World Championship. In 2012, he won the bronze medal at the European Championships. In 2013, he won bronze again at the Summer Universiade.

In 2014, he won a gold medal at the 2014 European Wrestling Championships, and bronze at the World Championships.

In 2015, he won the silver medal at the first European Games in Azerbaijan. On 10 September 2015, after winning against the then-reigning World Champion and then-Champion of Asia, Uzbek Rustam Assakalov scoring 6:0, Beleniuk won gold at the 2015 World Wrestling Championships in the under-85 kg weight category.

In 2016, he won gold at the 2016 European Wrestling Championships, followed by the silver medal at the 2016 Summer Olympics in Rio de Janeiro.

In 2021, he won the gold medal in the men's Greco-Roman 87 kg event at the 2020 Summer Olympics in Tokyo.

Beleniuk was briefly a member of the National Olympic Committee of Ukraine. He left the National Olympic Committee in January 2023 due to disagreement with its new president Vadym Gutzeit. In 2024, Beleniuk won a bronze medal in the men's Greco-Roman 87 kg at the 2024 Summer Olympics in Paris and subsequently retired from competing.

=== Politics ===
Beleniuk was elected a deputy to the Verkhovna Rada in July 2019 Ukrainian parliamentary election as a member of the Servant of the People political party. He was one of the first ten candidates on the party's electoral list.

== Achievements ==
Year	Tournament	Venue	Result	Event
2007	European Cadet Championships	Warsaw, Poland	2nd	Greco-Roman 76 kg
2008	European Cadet Championships	Daugavpils, Latvia	3rd	Greco-Roman 76 kg
2010	European Junior Championships	Samokov, Bulgaria	10th	Greco-Roman 84 kg
2010	World Junior Championships	Budapest, Hungary	3rd	Greco-Roman 84 kg
2011	European Junior Championships	Zrenjanin, Serbia	1st	Greco-Roman 84 kg
2011	World Junior Championships	Bucharest, Romania	2nd	Greco-Roman 84 kg
2012	European Championships	Belgrade, Serbia	3rd	Greco-Roman 84 kg
2013	European Championships	(Georgia (country)) Tbilisi, Georgia	8th	Greco-Roman 84 kg
2013	Summer Universiade	Kazan, Russia	3rd	Greco-Roman 84 kg
2014	European Championships	Vantaa, Finland	1st	Greco-Roman 85 kg
2014	World Championships	Tashkent, Uzbekistan	3rd	Greco-Roman 85 kg
2015	European Games	Baku, Azerbaijan	2nd	Greco-Roman 85 kg
2015	World Championships	Las Vegas, United States	1st	Greco-Roman 85 kg
2015	Military World Games	Mungyeong, South Korea	1st	Greco-Roman 85 kg
2016	European Championships	Riga, Latvia	1st	Greco-Roman 85 kg
2016	Olympic Games	Rio de Janeiro, Brazil	2nd	Greco-Roman 85 kg
2018	World Championships	Budapest, Hungary	2nd	Greco-Roman 87 kg
2019	European Championships	Bucharest, Romania	1st	Greco-Roman 87 kg
2019	European Games	Minsk, Belarus	1st	Greco-Roman 87 kg
2019	World Championships	Nur-Sultan, Kazakhstan	1st	Greco-Roman 87 kg
2021	European Championships	Warsaw, Poland	3rd	Greco-Roman 87 kg
2021	Olympic Games	Tokyo, Japan	1st	Greco-Roman 87 kg
2023	World Championships	Belgrade, Serbia	3rd	Greco-Roman 87 kg
2024	European Championships	Bucharest, Romania	3rd	Greco-Roman 87 kg
2024	Olympic Games	Paris, France	3rd	Greco-Roman 87 kg

== International competition ==
International record
Res.	Record	Opponent	Score	Date	Event	Location	Notes
2021 Olympic Champion (gold) at 87kg
Win	4–0	(Hungary) Viktor Lőrincz	5–1	2021-08-04	2020 Summer Olympics	Tokyo, Japan	
Win	3–0	(Croatia) Ivan Huklek	7–1	2021-08-03	2020 Summer Olympics	Tokyo, Japan	
Win	2–0	(Algeria) Bachir Sid Azara	1–1	2021-08-03	2020 Summer Olympics	Tokyo, Japan	
Win	1–0	(Serbia) Zurab Datunashvili	3–1	2021-08-03	2020 Summer Olympics	Tokyo, Japan	
2021 European Championships (bronze) at 87kg
Win	3–1	(Germany) Denis Kudla	1–1	2021-04-24	2021 European Championships	Warsaw, Poland	
Win	2–1	(Croatia) Vjekoslav Luburić	7–1	2021-04-24	2021 European Championships	Warsaw, Poland	
Loss	1–1	(Serbia) Zurab Datunashvili	1–1	2021-04-23	2021 European Championships	Warsaw, Poland	
Win	1–0	(Sweden) Oskar Johansson	7–1	2021-04-23	2021 European Championships	Warsaw, Poland	
2019 World Champion (gold) at 87kg
Win	5–0	(Hungary) Viktor Lőrincz	2–1	2019-09-16	2019 World Championships	Nur-Sultan, Kazakhstan	
Win	4–0	(Germany) Denis Kudla	2–1	2019-09-15	2019 World Championships	Nur-Sultan, Kazakhstan	
Win	3–0	(Belarus) Mikalai Stadub	3–1	2019-09-15	2019 World Championships	Nur-Sultan, Kazakhstan	
Win	2–0	(Croatia) Ivan Huklek	7–1	2019-09-15	2019 World Championships	Nur-Sultan, Kazakhstan	
Win	1–0	(Mexico) Alfonso Leyva	5–1	2019-09-15	2019 World Championships	Nur-Sultan, Kazakhstan	
2019 European Games Champion (gold) at 87kg
Win	4–0	(Azerbaijan) Islam Abbasov	3–1	2019-06-30	2019 European Games	Minsk, Belarus	
Win	3–0	(Belarus) Radzik Kuliyeu	3–1	2019-06-29	2019 European Games	Minsk, Belarus	
Win	2–0	(Poland) Arkadiusz Kułynycz	9–1	2019-06-29	2019 European Games	Minsk, Belarus	
Win	1–0	(Armenia) Maksim Manukyan	5–1	2019-06-29	2019 European Games	Minsk, Belarus	
2019 European Champion (gold) at 87kg
Win	4–0	(Azerbaijan) Islam Abbasov	5–1	2019-04-13	2019 European Championships	Bucharest, Romania	
Win	3–0	(Lithuania) Eividas Stankevičius	5–1	2019-04-12	2019 European Championships	Bucharest, Romania	
Win	2–0	(Hungary) Erik Szilvássy	3–1	2019-04-12	2019 European Championships	Bucharest, Romania	
Win	1–0	(Croatia) Ivan Huklek	6–1	2019-04-12	2019 European Championships	Bucharest, Romania	
2018 UWW world (silver) at 87kg
Loss	4–1	(Turkey) Metehan Başar	1–2	2018-10-27	2018 World Championships	Budapest, Hungary	
Win	4–0	(Azerbaijan) Islam Abbasov	5–1	2018-10-26	2018 World Championships	Budapest, Hungary	
Win	3–0	(Iran) Hossein Nouri	4–2	2018-10-26	2018 World Championships	Budapest, Hungary	
Win	2–0	(Armenia) Artur Shahinyan	4–1	2018-10-26	2018 World Championships	Budapest, Hungary	
Win	1–0	(Lithuania) Eividas Stankevičius	4–2	2018-10-26	2018 World Championships	Budapest, Hungary	
2016 Olympic (silver) at 85kg
Loss	3–1	(Russia) Davit Chakvetadze	2-9	2016-08-15	2016 Summer Olympics	(Brazil) Rio de Janeiro	
Win	3–0	(Belarus) Javid Hamzatau	6–0	2016-08-15	2016 Summer Olympics	(Brazil) Rio de Janeiro	
Win	2–0	(Bulgaria) Nikolay Bayryakov	10–1	2016-08-15	2016 Summer Olympics	(Brazil) Rio de Janeiro	
Win	1–0	(Egypt) Ahmed Othman	9–0	2016-08-15	2016 Summer Olympics	(Brazil) Rio de Janeiro	
2016 European Champion (gold) at 85kg
Win	4–0	(Georgia (country)) Roberti Kobliashvili	5–2	2016-03-13	European Championships	Riga, Latvia	
Win	3–0	(Lithuania) Laimutis Adomaitis	2–1	2016-03-13	European Championships	Riga, Latvia	
Win	2–0	(Germany) Denis Kudla	6–1	2016-03-13	European Championships	Riga, Latvia	
Win	1–0	(Sweden) Kristofer Johansson	5–0	2016-03-13	European Championships	Riga, Latvia	
2015 UWW world (gold) at 85kg
Win	6–0	(Uzbekistan) Rustam Assakalov	6–0	2015-09-09	2015 World Championships	(United States) Las Vegas, NV	
Win	5–0	(Azerbaijan) Saman Tahmasebi	3–1	2015-09-09	2015 World Championships	(United States) Las Vegas, NV	
Win	4–0	(Poland) Damian Janikowski	2–1	2015-09-09	2015 World Championships	(United States) Las Vegas, NV	
Win	3–0	(Hungary) Viktor Lőrincz	3–1	2015-09-09	2015 World Championships	(United States) Las Vegas, NV	
Win	2–0	(Germany) Ramsin Azizsir	3–0	2015-09-09	2015 World Championships	(United States) Las Vegas, NV	
Win	1–0	(Mexico) Alfonso Leyva	6–2	2015-09-09	2015 World Championships	(United States) Las Vegas, NV	
2015 European Games (silver) at 85kg
Loss	4–1	(Russia) Davit Chakvetadze	2–3	2015-06-14	2015 European Games	Baku, Azerbaijan	
Win	4–0	(Armenia) Maksim Manukyan	12–4	2015-06-14	2015 European Games	Baku, Azerbaijan	
Win	3–0	(Turkey) Metehan Başar	3–1	2015-06-14	2015 European Games	Baku, Azerbaijan	
Win	2–0	(Romania) Attila Tamas	7–0	2015-06-14	2015 European Games	Baku, Azerbaijan	
Win	1–0	(Serbia) Dejan Franjković	8–0	2015-06-14	2015 European Games	Baku, Azerbaijan	
2014 UWW world (bronze) at 85kg
Win	4–1	(Germany) Ramsin Azizsir	3–0	2014-09-12	2014 World Championships	Tashkent, Uzbekistan	
Loss	3–1	(Azerbaijan) Saman Tahmasebi	0–4	2014-09-12	2014 World Championships	Tashkent, Uzbekistan	
Win	3–0	(Egypt) Ahmed Othman	10–1	2014-09-12	2014 World Championships	Tashkent, Uzbekistan	
Win	2–0	(Cuba) Pablo Shorey	6–1	2014-09-12	2014 World Championships	Tashkent, Uzbekistan	
Win	1–0	(Finland) Rami Hietaniemi	1–0	2014-09-12	2014 World Championships	Tashkent, Uzbekistan	
2013 Summer Universiare (bronze) at 84kg
Win	4–1	(Kazakhstan) Nursultan Tursynov	3–1	2013-07-15	2013 Summer Universiade	Kazan, Russia	
Loss	3–1	(Armenia) Maksim Manukyan	0–5	2013-07-15	2013 Summer Universiade	Kazan, Russia	
Win	3–0	(Georgia (country)) Beka Rokva	3–1	2013-07-15	2013 Summer Universiade	Kazan, Russia	
Win	2–0	(Poland) Tadeusz Michalik	3–1	2013-07-15	2013 Summer Universiade	Kazan, Russia	
Win	1–0	(Turkey) Aslan Atem	3–1	2013-07-15	2013 Summer Universiade	Kazan, Russia	

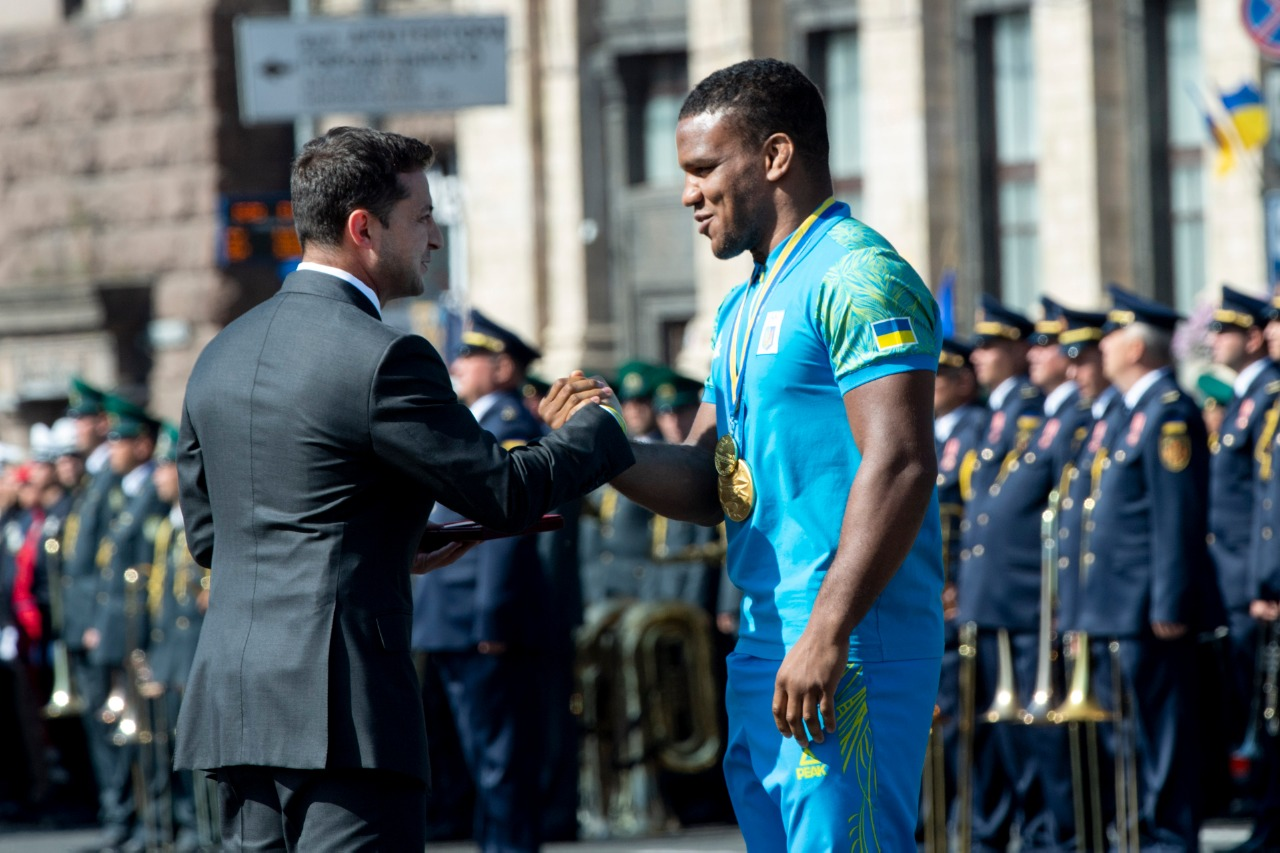
Beleniuk with President Volodymyr Zelenskyy in August 2019.

== See also ==
- List of members of the parliament of Ukraine, 2019–24
