= 2015 World Wrestling Championships – Men's Greco-Roman 85 kg =

Men's Greco-Roman 85 kg at the 2015 World Championships
- Venue: Orleans Arena
- Dates: 9 September 2015
- Competitors: 42 from 42 nations

Medalists
gold medal	Zhan Beleniuk	Ukraine
silver medal	Rustam Assakalov	Uzbekistan
bronze medal	Habibollah Akhlaghi	Iran
bronze medal	Saman Tahmasebi	Azerbaijan

The men's Greco-Roman 85 kilograms is a competition featured at the 2015 World Wrestling Championships, and was held in Las Vegas, United States on 9 September 2015.

== Results ==
Legend

- F — Won by fall

=== Finals ===
Semifinals		Final
Rami Hietaniemi (FIN)	0
Rustam Assakalov (UZB)	10^{F}	Rustam Assakalov (UZB)	0
Saman Tahmasebi (AZE)	1	Zhan Beleniuk (UKR)	6
Zhan Beleniuk (UKR)	3

=== Top half ===
==== Section 1 ====
Round of 64

Round of 32
Rami Hietaniemi (FIN)	10
Manoj Kumar (IND)	0
Artur Omarov (CZE)	8
Fabio Parisi (ITA)	1
Park Jin-sung (KOR)	0
Peng Fei (CHN)	4
Alo Toom (EST)	3
Nursultan Tursynov (KAZ)	7

Round of 16
Rami Hietaniemi (FIN)	8
Artur Omarov (CZE)	0
Peng Fei (CHN)	5
Nursultan Tursynov (KAZ)	9

Quarterfinals
Rami Hietaniemi (FIN)	4
Nursultan Tursynov (KAZ)	3

==== Section 2 ====
Round of 64

Round of 32
Javid Hamzatau (BLR)	3
Jordan Holm (USA)	1
Habibollah Akhlaghi (IRI)	9
Amanaly Ataýew (TKM)	0
Amer Hrustanović (AUT)	4
Janarbek Kenjeev (KGZ)	0
Mélonin Noumonvi (FRA)	0
Rustam Assakalov (UZB)	4^{F}

Round of 16
Javid Hamzatau (BLR)	1
Habibollah Akhlaghi (IRI)	6
Amer Hrustanović (AUT)	1
Rustam Assakalov (UZB)	10

Quarterfinals
Habibollah Akhlaghi (IRI)	7
Rustam Assakalov (UZB)	5^{F}

=== Bottom half ===
==== Section 3 ====
Round of 64
Timur Hamikoev (MKD)	0
Dorin Pârvan (ROU)	5
Rasmus Tjørstad (DEN)	0
Kristofer Johansson (SWE)	3

Round of 32
Ronisson Brandão (BRA)	0
Saman Tahmasebi (AZE)	8
Hristo Marinov (BUL)	2
Dejan Franković (SRB)	0
Maksim Manukyan (ARM)	3
Davit Chakvetadze (RUS)	5
Dorin Pârvan (ROU)	3
Kristofer Johansson (SWE)	1

Round of 16
Saman Tahmasebi (AZE)	7
Hristo Marinov (BUL)	3
Davit Chakvetadze (RUS)	8
Dorin Pârvan (ROU)	0

Quarterfinals
Saman Tahmasebi (AZE)	8
Davit Chakvetadze (RUS)	0

==== Section 4 ====
Round of 64
Nenad Žugaj (CRO)	5
Pedro García (ESP)	0
Querys Pérez (VEN)	3
Ahmed Othman (EGY)	4
Dimitrios Tsekeridis (GRE)	10
Taichi Oka (JPN)	0
Damian Janikowski (POL)	2
Aleksandr Kazakevič (LTU)	0
Alfonso Leyva (MEX)	2
Zhan Beleniuk (UKR)	6
Ramsin Azizsir (GER)	8
Metehan Başar (TUR)	1
Viktor Lőrincz (HUN)	10
Nolan Puletasi (ASA)	0
Dean van Zyl (RSA)	0
Mate Sopadze (GEO)	9

Round of 32
Nenad Žugaj (CRO)	8
Ahmed Othman (EGY)	0
Dimitrios Tsekeridis (GRE)	2
Damian Janikowski (POL)	7
Zhan Beleniuk (UKR)	3
Ramsin Azizsir (GER)	0
Viktor Lőrincz (HUN)	2
Mate Sopadze (GEO)	1

Round of 16
Nenad Žugaj (CRO)	1
Damian Janikowski (POL)	3
Zhan Beleniuk (UKR)	3
Viktor Lőrincz (HUN)	1

Quarterfinals
Damian Janikowski (POL)	1
Zhan Beleniuk (UKR)	2

=== Repechage ===
Repechage round 1
Alfonso Leyva (MEX)	0
Ramsin Azizsir (GER)	8

Repechage round 2
Mélonin Noumonvi (FRA)	3
Amer Hrustanović (AUT)	3
Ramsin Azizsir (GER)	0
Viktor Lőrincz (HUN)	6

Repechage round 3
Amer Hrustanović (AUT)	0
Habibollah Akhlaghi (IRI)	7
Viktor Lőrincz (HUN)	4
Damian Janikowski (POL)	0

Bronze medals
Habibollah Akhlaghi (IRI)	5
Rami Hietaniemi (FIN)	1
Viktor Lőrincz (HUN)	1
Saman Tahmasebi (AZE)	2
