= 2014 World Wrestling Championships – Men's Greco-Roman 85 kg =

Men's Greco-Roman 85 kg at the 2014 World Championships
- Venue: Gymnastics Sport Palace
- Dates: 12 September 2014
- Competitors: 36 from 36 nations

Medalists
gold medal	Mélonin Noumonvi	France
silver medal	Saman Tahmasebi	Azerbaijan
bronze medal	Zhan Beleniuk	Ukraine
bronze medal	Viktor Lőrincz	Hungary

The Men's Greco-Roman 85 kilograms is a competition featured at the 2014 World Wrestling Championships, and was held in Tashkent, Uzbekistan on 12 September 2014.

== Results ==
Legend

- C — Won by 3 cautions given to the opponent
- F — Won by fall

=== Finals ===
Semifinals		Final
Saman Tahmasebi (AZE)	4^{C}
Zhan Beleniuk (UKR)	0	Saman Tahmasebi (AZE)	0
Mélonin Noumonvi (FRA)	1	Mélonin Noumonvi (FRA)	3
Viktor Lőrincz (HUN)	0

=== Top half ===
==== Section 1 ====
Round of 64

Round of 32
Saman Tahmasebi (AZE)	3
Ramsin Azizsir (GER)	2
Andrey Samokhin (KAZ)	1
Kong Liang (CHN)	3
Hristo Marinov (BUL)	3
Vladimer Gegeshidze (GEO)	4
Fanolua Fanolua (ASA)	0
Isfandiyor Latipov (TJK)	7^{F}

Round of 16
Saman Tahmasebi (AZE)	2
Kong Liang (CHN)	0
Vladimer Gegeshidze (GEO)	10
Isfandiyor Latipov (TJK)	1

Quarterfinals
Saman Tahmasebi (AZE)	4
Vladimer Gegeshidze (GEO)	0

==== Section 2 ====
Round of 64

Round of 32
Pablo Shorey (CUB)	6
Azamat Bikbaev (RUS)	3
Zhan Beleniuk (UKR)	1
Rami Hietaniemi (FIN)	0
Laimutis Adomaitis (LTU)	8
Manoj Kumar (IND)	0
Ahmed Othman (EGY)	12
Alfonso Leyva (MEX)	4

Round of 16
Pablo Shorey (CUB)	1
Zhan Beleniuk (UKR)	6
Laimutis Adomaitis (LTU)	1
Ahmed Othman (EGY)	2

Quarterfinals
Zhan Beleniuk (UKR)	10
Ahmed Othman (EGY)	1

=== Bottom half ===
==== Section 3 ====
Round of 64

Round of 32
Alexander Brazón (VEN)	1
Masayuki Amano (JPN)	3
Damian Janikowski (POL)	5
Kang Nae-koo (KOR)	3
Kristofer Johansson (SWE)	9
Attila Tamaș (ROU)	0
Amer Hrustanović (AUT)	0
Mélonin Noumonvi (FRA)	5

Round of 16
Masayuki Amano (JPN)	8
Damian Janikowski (POL)	0
Kristofer Johansson (SWE)	2
Mélonin Noumonvi (FRA)	2

Quarterfinals
Masayuki Amano (JPN)	0
Mélonin Noumonvi (FRA)	2

==== Section 4 ====
Round of 64
Dimitrios Papadopoulos (GRE)	7
Aman Toktogonov (KGZ)	12
Rasmus Tjørstad (NOR)	0
Javid Hamzatau (BLR)	3
Rustam Assakalov (UZB)	5
Jordan Holm (USA)	0
Artur Shahinyan (ARM)	0
Mojtaba Karimfar (IRI)	3

Round of 32
Metehan Başar (TUR)	2
Artur Omarov (CZE)	2
Viktor Lőrincz (HUN)	3
Nenad Žugaj (CRO)	0
Aman Toktogonov (KGZ)	0
Javid Hamzatau (BLR)	9
Rustam Assakalov (UZB)	8
Mojtaba Karimfar (IRI)	4

Round of 16
Artur Omarov (CZE)	0
Viktor Lőrincz (HUN)	2
Javid Hamzatau (BLR)	6
Rustam Assakalov (UZB)	0

Quarterfinals
Viktor Lőrincz (HUN)	2
Javid Hamzatau (BLR)	0

=== Repechage ===
Repechage round 2
Ramsin Azizsir (GER)	6
Kong Liang (CHN)	0
Amer Hrustanović (AUT)	0
Kristofer Johansson (SWE)	5

Repechage round 3
Ramsin Azizsir (GER)	2
Vladimer Gegeshidze (GEO)	0
Kristofer Johansson (SWE)	6
Masayuki Amano (JPN)	4

Bronze medals
Ramsin Azizsir (GER)	0
Zhan Beleniuk (UKR)	3
Kristofer Johansson (SWE)	0
Viktor Lőrincz (HUN)	3
