= 2014 European Wrestling Championships – Men's Greco-Roman 85 kg =

Wrestling competitions

The Men's Greco-Roman 85 kg is a competition featured at the 2014 European Wrestling Championships, and was held in Vantaa, Finland on 6 April 2014.

== Medalists ==
Gold	Zhan Beleniuk; Ukraine
Silver	Rami Hietaniemi; Finland
Bronze	Damian Janikowski; Poland
Bronze	Amer Hrustanović; Austria

== Results ==
Legend

- F — Won by fall

=== Final ===
Final
Zhan Beleniuk (UKR)	2
Rami Hietaniemi (FIN)	1

=== Top half ===
Round of 32

Round of 16
Dimitrios Papadopoulos (GRE)	0
Hristo Marinov (BUL)	8
Nenad Zugaj (CRO)	0
Aleksey Mishin (RUS)	2
Amer Hrustanović (AUT)	0
Zhan Beleniuk (UKR)	2
Saman Tahmasebi (AZE)	3
Laimutis Adomaitis (LTU)	8^{F}

Quarterfinals
Hristo Marinov (BUL)	0
Aleksey Mishin (RUS)	3
Zhan Beleniuk (UKR)	2
Laimutis Adomaitis (LTU)	1

Semifinals
Aleksey Mishin (RUS)	2
Zhan Beleniuk (UKR)	4^{F}

=== Bottom half ===
Round of 32
Jim Pettersson (SWE)	5
Rami Hietaniemi (FIN)	6
Javid Hamzatau (BLR)	2
Damian Janikowski (POL)	4
Pavel Powada (CZE)	0
Roberti Kobliashvili (GEO)	8
Ahmet Yıldırım (TUR)	5
Attila Tamaș (ROU)	0

Round of 16
Maksim Manukyan (ARM)	11
Viktor Lőrincz (HUN)	1
Jan Fisher (GER)	6
Samba Diong (FRA)	3
Rami Hietaniemi (FIN)	4
Damian Janikowski (POL)	1
Roberti Kobliashvili (GEO)	1
Ahmet Yıldırım (TUR)	0

Quarterfinals
Maksim Manukyan (ARM)	0
Jan Fisher (GER)	3
Rami Hietaniemi (FIN)	2
Roberti Kobliashvili (GEO)	1

Semifinals
Jan Fisher (GER)	0
Rami Hietaniemi (FIN)	6

=== Repechage ===
Repechage round 1
Jim Pettersson (SWE)	1
Damian Janikowski (POL)	2

Repechage round 2
Amer Hrustanović (AUT)	3
Laimutis Adomaitis (LTU)	1
Damian Janikowski (POL)	6
Roberti Kobliashvili (GEO)	1

Bronze medals
Amer Hrustanović (AUT)	3
Aleksey Mishin (RUS)	1
Damian Janikowski (POL)	3
Jan Fisher (GER)	0
