= 2018 World Wrestling Championships – Men's Greco-Roman 87 kg =

Men's Greco-Roman 87 kg at the 2018 World Championships
- Venue: László Papp Budapest Sports Arena
- Dates: 26–27 October 2018
- Competitors: 34 from 34 nations

Medalists
gold medal	Metehan Başar	Turkey
silver medal	Zhan Beleniuk	Ukraine
bronze medal	Artur Shahinyan	Armenia
bronze medal	Roberti Kobliashvili	Georgia

The men's Greco-Roman 87 kilograms is a competition featured at the 2018 World Wrestling Championships, and was held in Budapest, Hungary on 26 and 27 October.

== Results ==
Legend

- F — Won by fall

=== Finals ===
Semifinals		Final
Islam Abbasov (AZE)	1
Zhan Beleniuk (UKR)	5	Zhan Beleniuk (UKR)	1
Metehan Başar (TUR)	2	Metehan Başar (TUR)	2
Bekkhan Ozdoev (RUS)	1

=== Top half ===
==== Section 1 ====
Round of 64

Round of 32
Islam Abbasov (AZE)	5
Lesyan Cousin (JAM)	2
Dimitrios Tsekeridis (GRE)	1
Amer Hrustanović (AUT)	1
Radzik Kuliyeu (BLR)	5^{F}
Fabio Parisi (ITA)	5
Tadeusz Michalik (POL)	5
Zakarias Berg (SWE)	2

Round of 16
Islam Abbasov (AZE)	11
Dimitrios Tsekeridis (GRE)	2
Radzik Kuliyeu (BLR)	2^{F}
Tadeusz Michalik (POL)	1

Quarterfinals
Islam Abbasov (AZE)	4
Radzik Kuliyeu (BLR)	1

==== Section 2 ====
Round of 64

Round of 32
Rami Hietaniemi (FIN)	0
Hossein Nouri (IRI)	9
Manjeet (IND)	0
Eerik Aps (EST)	8
Artur Shahinyan (ARM)	9
Roman Zhernovetski (ISR)	0
Zhan Beleniuk (UKR)	4
Eividas Stankevičius (LTU)	2

Round of 16
Hossein Nouri (IRI)	5
Eerik Aps (EST)	0
Artur Shahinyan (ARM)	1
Zhan Beleniuk (UKR)	4

Quarterfinals
Hossein Nouri (IRI)	2
Zhan Beleniuk (UKR)	4

=== Bottom half ===
==== Section 3 ====
Round of 64

Round of 32
Roberti Kobliashvili (GEO)	9
Abbas Shaalan (IRQ)	0
Viktor Lőrincz (HUN)	5
Patrick Martinez (USA)	1
Park Hea-geun (KOR)	0
Adem Boudjemline (ALG)	8
Philip Barreiro (CAN)	0
Metehan Başar (TUR)	9

Round of 16
Roberti Kobliashvili (GEO)	3
Viktor Lőrincz (HUN)	3
Adem Boudjemline (ALG)	2
Metehan Başar (TUR)	3

Quarterfinals
Roberti Kobliashvili (GEO)	1
Metehan Başar (TUR)	1

==== Section 4 ====
Round of 64
Peng Fei (CHN)	5
Khalis Ghilmanou (FRA)	4
Denis Kudla (GER)	10
Nikolaj Dobrev (SRB)	1

Round of 32
Bekkhan Ozdoev (RUS)	9
Azamat Kustubayev (KAZ)	0
Daniel Grégorich (CUB)	10
Yoan Dimitrov (BUL)	2
Rustam Assakalov (UZB)	10
Peng Fei (CHN)	0
Denis Kudla (GER)	2
Masato Sumi (JPN)	1

Round of 16
Bekkhan Ozdoev (RUS)	9
Daniel Grégorich (CUB)	0
Rustam Assakalov (UZB)	5
Denis Kudla (GER)	2

Quarterfinals
Bekkhan Ozdoev (RUS)	6
Rustam Assakalov (UZB)	4

=== Repechage ===
Repechage round 2
Eividas Stankevičius (LTU)	0
Artur Shahinyan (ARM)	9
Philip Barreiro (CAN)	0
Adem Boudjemline (ALG)	9

Repechage round 3
Artur Shahinyan (ARM)	8
Hossein Nouri (IRI)	5
Adem Boudjemline (ALG)	1
Roberti Kobliashvili (GEO)	9

Bronze medals
Artur Shahinyan (ARM)	6
Islam Abbasov (AZE)	1
Roberti Kobliashvili (GEO)	4
Bekkhan Ozdoev (RUS)	2
