= Wrestling at the 2015 European Games – Men's Greco-Roman 85 kg =

Wrestling competition

Men's Greco-Roman 85 kg at the 2015 European Games
- Venue: Heydar Aliyev Arena
- Date: 14 June
- Competitors: 24 from 24 nations

Medalists
gold medal	Davit Chakvetadze	Russia
silver medal	Zhan Beleniuk	Ukraine
bronze medal	Metehan Başar	Turkey
bronze medal	Ramsin Azizsir	Germany

Men's Greco-Roman 85 kg competition at the 2015 European Games in Baku, Azerbaijan, took place on 14 June at the Heydar Aliyev Arena.

== Schedule ==
All times are Azerbaijan Summer Time (UTC+05:00)

Date	Time	Event
Sunday, 14 June 2015	10:00	Qualifications
Sunday, 14 June 2015	11:00	1/8 finals
Sunday, 14 June 2015	13:00	Quarterfinals
Sunday, 14 June 2015	13:00	Semifinals
Sunday, 14 June 2015	15:00	Repechage
Sunday, 14 June 2015	19:00	Finals

== Results ==
Legend

- C — Won by 3 cautions given to the opponent
- F — Won by fall

=== Final ===
Final
(Russia) Davit Chakvetadze (RUS)	3
(Ukraine) Zhan Beleniuk (UKR)	2

=== Top half ===
Qualifications

1/8 finals
(Russia) Davit Chakvetadze (RUS)	4
(Austria) Amer Hrustanović (AUT)	0
(Poland) Damian Janikowski (POL)	0
(Germany) Ramsin Azizsir (GER)	4
(North Macedonia) Timur Khamikoev (MKD)	0
(Croatia) Nenad Žugaj (CRO)	8
(Estonia) Eerik Aps (EST)	3
(Sweden) Emil Sandahl (SWE)	2

Quarterfinals
(Russia) Davit Chakvetadze (RUS)	8
(Germany) Ramsin Azizsir (GER)	0
(Croatia) Nenad Žugaj (CRO)	5
(Estonia) Eerik Aps (EST)	0

Semifinals
(Russia) Davit Chakvetadze (RUS)	6
(Croatia) Nenad Žugaj (CRO)	2

=== Bottom half ===
Qualifications
(Greece) Dimitrios Papadopoulos (GRE)	0
(Romania) Attila Tamaș (ROU)	7^{F}
(Ukraine) Zhan Beleniuk (UKR)	8
(Serbia) Dejan Franjković (SRB)	0
(Norway) Rasmus Tjørstad (NOR)	4
(Bulgaria) Nikolay Bayryakov (BUL)	1
(Turkey) Metehan Başar (TUR)	5
(Georgia (country)) Mate Sopadze (GEO)	2
(Lithuania) Aleksandr Kazakevič (LTU)	5
(Belarus) Javid Hamzatau (BLR)	0
(Hungary) Patrik Szabó (HUN)	3
(Finland) Marko Kivimäki (FIN)	2
(Armenia) Maksim Manukyan (ARM)	8
(Czech Republic) Artur Omarov (CZE)	1
(Azerbaijan) Saman Tahmasebi (AZE)	8
(Italy) Fabio Parisi (ITA)	0

1/8 finals
(Romania) Attila Tamaș (ROU)	0
(Ukraine) Zhan Beleniuk (UKR)	7
(Norway) Rasmus Tjørstad (NOR)	0
(Turkey) Metehan Başar (TUR)	2
(Lithuania) Aleksandr Kazakevič (LTU)	9
(Hungary) Patrik Szabó (HUN)	0
(Armenia) Maksim Manukyan (ARM)	9
(Azerbaijan) Saman Tahmasebi (AZE)	0

Quarterfinals
(Ukraine) Zhan Beleniuk (UKR)	3
(Turkey) Metehan Başar (TUR)	1
(Lithuania) Aleksandr Kazakevič (LTU)	5
(Armenia) Maksim Manukyan (ARM)	5

Semifinals
(Ukraine) Zhan Beleniuk (UKR)	12
(Armenia) Maksim Manukyan (ARM)	4

=== Repechage ===
Repechage round 1
(Serbia) Dejan Franjković (SRB)	5
(Romania) Attila Tamaș (ROU)	6^{C}

Repechage round 2
(Austria) Amer Hrustanović (AUT)	2
(Germany) Ramsin Azizsir (GER)	5
(Romania) Attila Tamaș (ROU)	1
(Turkey) Metehan Başar (TUR)	2

Bronze medal match
(Germany) Ramsin Azizsir (GER)	5
(Croatia) Nenad Žugaj (CRO)	1
(Turkey) Metehan Başar (TUR)	3
(Armenia) Maksim Manukyan (ARM)	0
