= 2019 World Wrestling Championships – Men's Greco-Roman 87 kg =

Men's Greco-Roman 87 kg at the 2019 World Championships
- Venue: Barys Arena
- Dates: 15–16 September 2019
- Competitors: 39 from 39 nations

Medalists
gold medal	Zhan Beleniuk	Ukraine
silver medal	Viktor Lőrincz	Hungary
bronze medal	Denis Kudla	Germany
bronze medal	Rustam Assakalov	Uzbekistan

The men's Greco-Roman 87 kilograms is a competition featured at the 2019 World Wrestling Championships, and was held in Nur-Sultan, Kazakhstan, on 15 and 16 September.

== Results ==
Legend

- F — Won by fall

=== Finals ===
Semifinals		Final
Zhan Beleniuk (UKR)	2
Denis Kudla (GER)	1	Zhan Beleniuk (UKR)	2
Viktor Lőrincz (HUN)	1	Viktor Lőrincz (HUN)	1
Rustam Assakalov (UZB)	1

=== Top half ===
==== Section 1 ====
Round of 64

Round of 32
Zhan Beleniuk (UKR)	5
Alfonso Leyva (MEX)	1
Nicu Ojog (ROU)	0
Ivan Huklek (CRO)	10^{F}
Sunil Kumar (IND)	0
Joe Rau (USA)	6
Mikalai Stadub (BLR)	7
Ramon Betschart (SUI)	1

Round of 16
Zhan Beleniuk (UKR)	7
Ivan Huklek (CRO)	1
Joe Rau (USA)	1
Mikalai Stadub (BLR)	9

Quarterfinals
Zhan Beleniuk (UKR)	3
Mikalai Stadub (BLR)	1

==== Section 2 ====
Round of 64

Round of 32
Amer Hrustanović (AUT)	6
Fabio Parisi (ITA)	0
Denis Kudla (GER)	3
Tarek Abdelslam (BUL)	1
Ramin Taheri (IRI)	2
Zakarias Berg (SWE)	1
Gurami Khetsuriani (GEO)	0
Islam Abbasov (AZE)	4

Round of 16
Amer Hrustanović (AUT)	1
Denis Kudla (GER)	3
Ramin Taheri (IRI)	6
Islam Abbasov (AZE)	0

Quarterfinals
Denis Kudla (GER)	1
Ramin Taheri (IRI)	1

=== Bottom half ===
==== Section 3 ====
Round of 64

Round of 32
Viktor Lőrincz (HUN)	9
Şyhazberdi Öwelekow (TKM)	0
Atabek Azisbekov (KGZ)	4
Laimutis Adomaitis (LTU)	0
Masato Sumi (JPN)	1
Dimitrios Tsekeridis (GRE)	4^{F}
Na Junjie (CHN)	9
Tokhirdzhon Okhonov (TJK)	0

Round of 16
Viktor Lőrincz (HUN)	8^{F}
Atabek Azisbekov (KGZ)	1
Dimitrios Tsekeridis (GRE)	1
Na Junjie (CHN)	2

Quarterfinals
Viktor Lőrincz (HUN)	3
Na Junjie (CHN)	1

==== Section 4 ====
Round of 64
Azamat Kustubayev (KAZ)	5
Luis Avendaño (VEN)	1
Jesús Gasca (ESP)	0
Khalis Ghilmanou (FRA)	2
Park Hea-geun (KOR)	9
Michael Shinohara (GUM)	0
Artur Shahinyan (ARM)	1
Daniel Grégorich (CUB)	4
Aleksandr Komarov (RUS)	4
Bachir Sid Azara (ALG)	0
Arkadiusz Kułynycz (POL)	9
Rami Hietaniemi (FIN)	2
Alvis Almendra (PAN)	0
Rustam Assakalov (UZB)	6^{F}

Round of 32
Azamat Kustubayev (KAZ)	7^{F}
Khalis Ghilmanou (FRA)	1
Park Hea-geun (KOR)	0
Daniel Grégorich (CUB)	5^{F}
Aleksandr Komarov (RUS)	9
Arkadiusz Kułynycz (POL)	0
Rustam Assakalov (UZB)	5^{F}
Metehan Başar (TUR)	0

Round of 16
Azamat Kustubayev (KAZ)	1
Daniel Grégorich (CUB)	1
Aleksandr Komarov (RUS)	5
Rustam Assakalov (UZB)	3^{F}

Quarterfinals
Daniel Grégorich (CUB)	0
Rustam Assakalov (UZB)	4

=== Repechage ===
Repechage round 2
Alfonso Leyva (MEX)	6
Ivan Huklek (CRO)	8
Şyhazberdi Öwelekow (TKM)	0
Atabek Azisbekov (KGZ)	6

Repechage round 3
Ivan Huklek (CRO)	1
Mikalai Stadub (BLR)	5
Atabek Azisbekov (KGZ)	6
Na Junjie (CHN)	1

Bronze medals
Mikalai Stadub (BLR)	1
Denis Kudla (GER)	2
Atabek Azisbekov (KGZ)	2
Rustam Assakalov (UZB)	6
