= Wrestling at the 2016 Summer Olympics – Men's Greco-Roman 85 kg =

Men's Greco-Roman 85 kg at the Games of the XXXI Olympiad
- Venue: Carioca Arena 2
- Date: 15 August 2016
- Competitors: 21 from 21 nations

Medalists
1st place, gold medalist(s)		Davit Chakvetadze	Russia
2nd place, silver medalist(s)		Zhan Beleniuk	Ukraine
3rd place, bronze medalist(s)		Javid Hamzatau	Belarus
3rd place, bronze medalist(s)		Denis Kudla	Germany

Men's Greco-Roman 85 kilograms competition at the 2016 Summer Olympics in Rio de Janeiro, Brazil, took place on 15 August at the Carioca Arena 2 in Barra da Tijuca.

This Greco-Roman wrestling competition consists of a single-elimination tournament, with a repechage used to determine the winner of two bronze medals. The two finalists face off for gold and silver medals. Each wrestler who loses to one of the two finalists moves into the repechage, culminating in a pair of bronze medal matches featuring the semifinal losers each facing the remaining repechage opponent from their half of the bracket.

The medals for the competition were presented by Sir Austin L. Sealy, KT, IOC member, Barbados, and the gifts were presented by Stanley Dziedzic, Vice President of UWW.

== Schedule ==
All times are Brasília Standard Time (UTC−03:00)

Date	Time	Event
15 August 2016	10:00	Qualification rounds
15 August 2016	16:00	Repechage
15 August 2016	17:00	Finals

== Results ==
Legend

- F — Won by fall

=== Final ===
Final
Zhan Beleniuk (UKR)	2
Davit Chakvetadze (RUS)	9

=== Top half ===
Qualifications

1/8 finals
Zhan Beleniuk (UKR)	9
Ahmed Othman (EGY)	0
Adem Boudjemline (ALG)	0
Nikolay Bayryakov (BUL)	4
Rami Hietaniemi (FIN)	3
Amer Hrustanović (AUT)	4
Javid Hamzatau (BLR)	4
Peng Fei (CHN)	0

1/4 finals
Zhan Beleniuk (UKR)	10
Nikolay Bayryakov (BUL)	1
Amer Hrustanović (AUT)	0
Javid Hamzatau (BLR)	9

Semifinals
Zhan Beleniuk (UKR)	6
Javid Hamzatau (BLR)	0

=== Bottom half ===
Qualifications
Maksim Manukyan (ARM)	0
Viktor Lőrincz (HUN)	3
Davit Chakvetadze (RUS)	3
Saman Tahmasebi (AZE)	0
Habibollah Akhlaghi (IRI)	10
Zakarias Berg (SWE)	0
Denis Kudla (GER)	2
Janarbek Kenjeev (KGZ)	0
Roberti Kobliashvili (GEO)	5
Alfonso Leyva (MEX)	0

1/8 finals
Rustam Assakalov (UZB)	6
Ben Provisor (USA)	3
Ravinder Khatri (IND)	0
Viktor Lőrincz (HUN)	9
Davit Chakvetadze (RUS)	9^{F}
Habibollah Akhlaghi (IRI)	2
Denis Kudla (GER)	1
Roberti Kobliashvili (GEO)	1

1/4 finals
Rustam Assakalov (UZB)	1
Viktor Lőrincz (HUN)	2
Davit Chakvetadze (RUS)	8
Denis Kudla (GER)	0

Semifinals
Viktor Lőrincz (HUN)	1
Davit Chakvetadze (RUS)	7

=== Repechage ===
Repechage round 1
Saman Tahmasebi (AZE)	2
Habibollah Akhlaghi (IRI)	3

Repechage round 2
Ahmed Othman (EGY)	1
Nikolay Bayryakov (BUL)	2
Habibollah Akhlaghi (IRI)	1
Denis Kudla (GER)	1

Bronze medals
Nikolay Bayryakov (BUL)	1
Javid Hamzatau (BLR)	4
Denis Kudla (GER)	3
Viktor Lőrincz (HUN)	3

== Final standing ==
Rank	Athlete
1st place, gold medalist(s)	Davit Chakvetadze (RUS)
2nd place, silver medalist(s)	Zhan Beleniuk (UKR)
3rd place, bronze medalist(s)	Javid Hamzatau (BLR)
3rd place, bronze medalist(s)	Denis Kudla (GER)
5	Nikolay Bayryakov (BUL)
5	Viktor Lőrincz (HUN)
7	Habibollah Akhlaghi (IRI)
8	Rustam Assakalov (UZB)
9	Roberti Kobliashvili (GEO)
10	Amer Hrustanović (AUT)
11	Rami Hietaniemi (FIN)
12	Ben Provisor (USA)
13	Saman Tahmasebi (AZE)
14	Ahmed Othman (EGY)
15	Janarbek Kenjeev (KGZ)
16	Maksim Manukyan (ARM)
17	Adem Boudjemline (ALG)
17	Peng Fei (CHN)
19	Alfonso Leyva (MEX)
20	Ravinder Khatri (IND)
21	Zakarias Berg (SWE)
