= 2016 European Wrestling Championships – Men's Greco-Roman 85 kg =

The men's Greco-Roman 85 kg is a competition featured at the 2016 European Wrestling Championships, and was held in Riga, Latvia on March 13.

== Medalists ==
Gold	Zhan Beleniuk; Ukraine
Silver	Roberti Kobliashvili; Georgia
Bronze	Tadeusz Michalik; Poland
Bronze	Denis Kudla; Germany

== Results ==
Legend

- F — Won by fall

=== Final ===
Final
Zhan Beleniuk (UKR)	5
Roberti Kobliashvili (GEO)	2

=== Top half ===
Round of 32

Round of 16
Fabio Parisi (ITA)	0
Nikolay Bayryakov (BUL)	10
Ilja Resetnikovs (LAT)	0
Laimutis Adomaitis (LTU)	8
Zhan Beleniuk (UKR)	5
Kristofer Johansson (SWE)	0
Metehan Başar (TUR)	0
Denis Kudla (GER)	1

Quarterfinals
Nikolay Bayryakov (BUL)	4
Laimutis Adomaitis (LTU)	8
Zhan Beleniuk (UKR)	6
Denis Kudla (GER)	1

Semifinals
Laimutis Adomaitis (LTU)	1
Zhan Beleniuk (UKR)	2

=== Bottom half ===
Round of 32
Viktar Sasunouski (BLR)	5
Amer Hrustanović (AUT)	7
Tadeusz Michalik (POL)	7
Islam Abbasov (AZE)	1
Viktor Lőrincz (HUN)	5
Attila Tamas (ROM)	0
Eerik Aps (EST)	1
Nenad Zugaj (CRO)	3
Artur Omarov (CZE)	0
Maksim Manukyan (ARM)	3
Jon Isaksen (NOR)	0
Evgeny Saleev (RUS)	2

Round of 16
Roberti Kobliashvili (GEO)	9
Petar Balo (SRB)	0
Amer Hrustanović (AUT)	6
Tadeusz Michalik (POL)	7
Viktor Lőrincz (HUN)	1
Nenad Zugaj (CRO)	0
Maksim Manukyan (ARM)	6
Evgeny Saleev (RUS)	11

Quarterfinals
Roberti Kobliashvili (GEO)	3
Tadeusz Michalik (POL)	0
Viktor Lőrincz (HUN)	1
Evgeny Saleev (RUS)	5

Semifinals
Roberti Kobliashvili (GEO)	1
Evgeny Saleev (RUS)	1

=== Repechage ===
Repechage round 2
Kristofer Johansson (SWE)	1
Denis Kudla (GER)	5
Petar Balo (SRB)	0
Tadeusz Michalik (POL)	8

Bronze medals
Denis Kudla (GER)	5
Amer Hrustanovich (AUT)	2
Tadeusz Michalik (POL)	3
Evgeny Saleev (RUS)	2
