= 2017 European Wrestling Championships – Men's Greco-Roman 85 kg =

The Men's Greco-Roman 85 kg is a competition featured at the 2017 European Wrestling Championships, and was held in Novi Sad, Serbia on May 7.

== Medalists ==
Gold	Viktor Lőrincz (HUN)
Silver	Metehan Başar (TUR)
Bronze	Nikolay Bayryakov (BUL)
Bronze	Ramsin Azizsir (GER)

== Results ==
Legend

- F — Won by fall

=== Final ===
Final
Viktor Lőrincz (HUN)	3
Metehan Başar (TUR)	2

=== Top half ===
Round of 32

Round of 16
Tadeusz Michalik (POL)	1
Eerik Aps (EST)	1
Viktor Lőrincz (HUN)	4
Julius Matuzevicius (LTU)	0
Emil Sandahl (SWE)	7
Jesus Gasca Fresnada (ESP)	0
Fabio Parisi (ITA)	1
Nikolay Bayryakov (BUL)	2

Quarterfinals
Eerik Aps (EST)	0
Viktor Lőrincz (HUN)	4
Emil Sandahl (SWE)	1
Nikolay Bayryakov (BUL)	2

Semifinals
Viktor Lőrincz (HUN)	2
Nikolay Bayryakov (BUL)	0

=== Bottom half ===
Round of 32
Maksim Manukyan (ARM)	2
Robert Kobliashvili (GEO)	1
Dejan Franjković (SRB)	7
Davit Chakvetadze (RUS)	4

Round of 16
Metehan Başar (TUR)	2
Arif Niftullayev (AZE)	1
Lukas Staudacher (AUT)	0
Iurii Shkriuba (UKR)	9
Ramsin Azizsir (GER)	4
Andrei Mikhailouski (BLR)	0
Maksim Manukyan (ARM)	2
Dejan Franjković (SRB)	0

Quarterfinals
Metehan Başar (TUR)	2
Iurii Shkriuba (UKR)	2
Ramsin Azizsir (GER)	2
Maksim Manukyan (ARM)	1

Semifinals
Metehan Başar (TUR)	3
Ramsin Azizsir (GER)	3

=== Repechage ===
Repechage round 2
Julius Matuzevicius (LTU)	0
Eerik Aps (EST)	2
Arif Niftullayev (AZE)	2
Iurii Shkriuba (UKR)	10

Bronze medals
Nikolay Bayryakov (BUL)	2
Eerik Aps (EST)	0
Ramsin Azizsir (GER)	1
Iurii Shkriuba (UKR)	0
