= Wrestling at the 2020 Summer Olympics – Men's Greco-Roman 87 kg =

Men's Greco-Roman 87 kg at the Games of the XXXII Olympiad
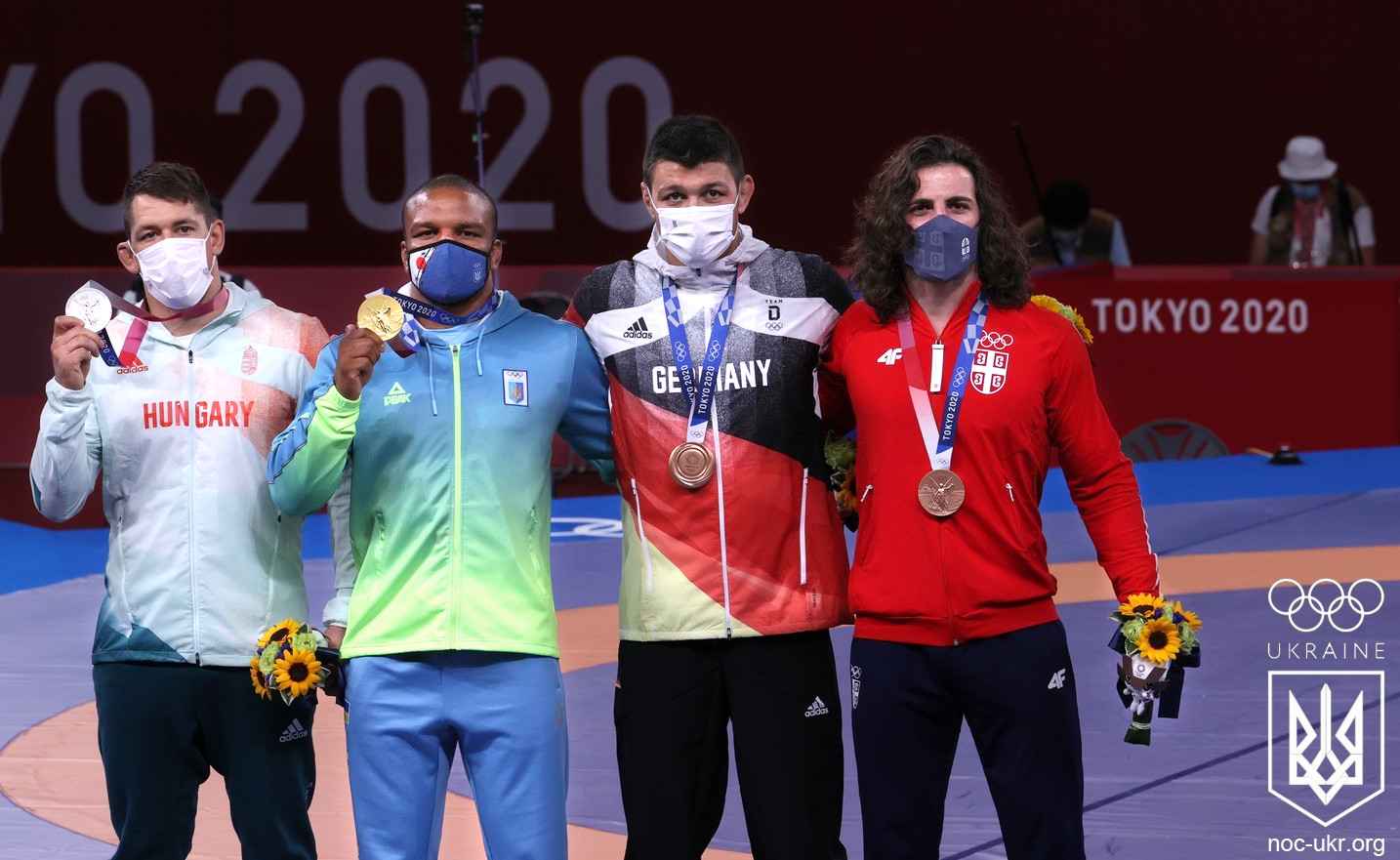
- Venue: Makuhari Messe
- Date: 3–4 August 2021
- Competitors: 16 from 16 nations

Medalists
1st place, gold medalist(s)		Zhan Beleniuk	Ukraine
2nd place, silver medalist(s)		Viktor Lőrincz	Hungary
3rd place, bronze medalist(s)		Denis Kudla	Germany
3rd place, bronze medalist(s)		Ivan Huklek (not yet allocated)	Croatia

The men's Greco-Roman 87 kilograms competition at the 2020 Summer Olympics in Tokyo, Japan, took place on 3–4 August 2021 at the Makuhari Messe in Mihama-ku. The qualification rounds were held on 3 August while medal matches were held on the 2nd day of the competition.

This freestyle wrestling competition consists of a single-elimination tournament, with a repechage used to determine the winner of two bronze medals. The two finalists face off for gold and silver medals. Each wrestler who loses to one of the two finalists moves into the repechage, culminating in a pair of bronze medal matches featuring the semifinal losers each facing the remaining repechage opponent from their half of the bracket.

Zhan Beleniuk from Ukraine won the gold medal after beating Viktor Lőrincz of Hungary 5–1 in the gold medal match. Beleniuk scored two points twice in the second period for the win.

On 21 November 2025, the Anti-Doping Section of the Court of Arbitration for Sport ruled that an original bronze medalist, Zurabi Datunashvili, had violated anti-doping rules by using a prohibited method and the falsification of test results: the Court imposed a five-year ban and ordered that all of Datunashvili's results since 27 May 2021 be deleted from the records.

Datunashvili's appeal was rejected by the Court of Arbitration for Sport, and he was stripped of his medal. According to the IOC database, this bronze medal has not subsequently been reallocated; Croatia's Ivan Huklek stands next in line.

== Schedule ==
All times are Japan Standard Time (UTC+09:00)

Date	Time	Event
3 August 2021	11:00	Qualification rounds
3 August 2021	18:15	Semifinals
4 August 2021	11:00	Repechage
4 August 2021	19:30	Finals

== Results ==
Legend

- F — Won by fall

=== Main bracket ===
1/8 finals
Viktor Lőrincz (HUN)	6
Atabek Azisbekov (KGZ)	1
Denis Kudla (GER)	4
Nursultan Tursynov (KAZ)	1
Kiryl Maskevich (BLR)	1
Mohamed Metwally (EGY)	9
Islam Abbasov (AZE)	1
Daniel Grégorich (CUB)	3
Rustam Assakalov (UZB)	6
Lasha Gobadze (GEO)	5
Ivan Huklek (CRO)	5
John Stefanowicz (USA)	3
Peng Fei (CHN)	1
Bachir Sid Azara (ALG)	11
Zurabi Datunashvili (SRB)	1
Zhan Beleniuk (UKR)	3

1/4 finals
Viktor Lőrincz (HUN)	1
Denis Kudla (GER)	1
Mohamed Metwally (EGY)	4^{F}
Daniel Grégorich (CUB)	0
Rustam Assakalov (UZB)	1
Ivan Huklek (CRO)	4
Bachir Sid Azara (ALG)	1
Zhan Beleniuk (UKR)	1

Semifinals
Viktor Lőrincz (HUN)	9
Mohamed Metwally (EGY)	2
Ivan Huklek (CRO)	1
Zhan Beleniuk (UKR)	7

Final
Viktor Lőrincz (HUN)	1
Zhan Beleniuk (UKR)	5

=== Repechage ===
Repechage
Atabek Azisbekov (KGZ)	2
Denis Kudla (GER)	10
Zurabi Datunashvili (SRB)	5
Bachir Sid Azara (ALG)	1

Bronze medal matches
Denis Kudla (GER)	8^{F}
Mohamed Metwally (EGY)	1
Zurabi Datunashvili (SRB)	6
Ivan Huklek (CRO)	1

== Final standing ==
Rank	Athlete
1st place, gold medalist(s)	Zhan Beleniuk (UKR)
2nd place, silver medalist(s)	Viktor Lőrincz (HUN)
3rd place, bronze medalist(s)	Denis Kudla (GER)
3rd place, bronze medalist(s)	Ivan Huklek (CRO) (not yet allocated)
5	Mohamed Metwally (EGY)
5	Bachir Sid Azara (ALG)
7	Rustam Assakalov (UZB)
8	Daniel Grégorich (CUB)
9	Atabek Azisbekov (KGZ)
10	Lasha Gobadze (GEO)
11	John Stefanowicz (USA)
12	Islam Abbasov (AZE)
13	Nursultan Tursynov (KAZ)
14	Kiryl Maskevich (BLR)
15	Peng Fei (CHN)
DQ	Zurabi Datunashvili (SRB)

- Zurabi Datunashvili of Serbia originally was a bronze medalist, but he was disqualified for anti-doping violations in November 2025.
