= 2021 European Wrestling Championships – Men's Greco-Roman 87 kg =

Wrestling competition

The Men's Greco-Roman 87 kg is a competition featured at the 2021 European Wrestling Championships, and was held in Warsaw, Poland on April 23 and April 24.

== Medalists ==
Gold	Zurabi Datunashvili; Serbia
Silver	Kiryl Maskevich; Belarus
Bronze	Zhan Beleniuk; Ukraine
Bronze	Milad Alirzaev; Russia

== Results ==
Legend

- F — Won by fall

=== Final ===
Final
Zurabi Datunashvili (SRB)	5
Kiryl Maskevich (BLR)	1

=== Top half ===
Round of 32

Round of 16
Vjekoslav Luburić (CRO)	1
Zurabi Datunashvili (SRB)	6
Oskar Johansson (SWE)	1
Zhan Beleniuk (UKR)	7
Dimitrios Papadopoulos (GRE)	2
Michael Wagner (AUT)	4
Martynas Nemsevičius (LTU)	1
Denis Kudla (GER)	4

Quarterfinals
Zurabi Datunashvili (SRB)	1
Zhan Beleniuk (UKR)	1
Michael Wagner (AUT)	0
Denis Kudla (GER)	3

Semifinals
Zurabi Datunashvili (SRB)	2
Denis Kudla (GER)	1

=== Bottom half ===
Round of 32
Tornike Dzamashvili (GEO)	6^{F}
Arkadiusz Kułynycz (POL)	1
Milad Alirzaev (RUS)	6
Doğan Göktaş (TUR)	6
Viktor Lőrincz (HUN)	0
Kiryl Maskevich (BLR)	9

Round of 16
Andreas Välis (EST)	1
Petr Novák (CZE)	9
Turpal Bisultanov (DEN)	6
Viorel Burduja (MDA)	0
Yoan Dimitrov (BUL)	1
Tornike Dzamashvili (GEO)	5
Milad Alirzaev (RUS)	6
Kiryl Maskevich (BLR)	4^{F}

Quarterfinals
Petr Novák (CZE)	0
Turpal Bisultanov (DEN)	8
Tornike Dzamashvili (GEO)	2
Kiryl Maskevich (BLR)	9

Semifinals
Turpal Bisultanov (DEN)	1
Kiryl Maskevich (BLR)	9

=== Repechage ===
Repechage round 1
Viktor Lőrincz (HUN)	1
Milad Alirzaev (RUS)	1

Repechage round 2
Vjekoslav Luburić (CRO)	1
Zhan Beleniuk (UKR)	7
Milad Alirzaev (RUS)	10
Tornike Dzamashvili (GEO)	2

Bronze medal match
Zhan Beleniuk (UKR)	1
Denis Kudla (GER)	1
Milad Alirzaev (RUS)	8
Turpal Bisultanov (DEN)	1

== Final standing ==
Rank	Athlete
1st place, gold medalist(s)	Zurabi Datunashvili (SRB)
2nd place, silver medalist(s)	Kiryl Maskevich (BLR)
3rd place, bronze medalist(s)	Zhan Beleniuk (UKR)
3rd place, bronze medalist(s)	Milad Alirzaev (RUS)
5	Denis Kudla (GER)
5	Turpal Bisultanov (DEN)
7	Tornike Dzamashvili (GEO)
8	Petr Novák (CZE)
9	Michael Wagner (AUT)
10	Vjekoslav Luburić (CRO)
11	Doğan Göktaş (TUR)
12	Dimitrios Papadopoulos (GRE)
13	Martynas Nemsevičius (LTU)
14	Yoan Dimitrov (BUL)
15	Oskar Johansson (SWE)
16	Andreas Välis (EST)
17	Viktor Lőrincz (HUN)
18	Arkadiusz Kułynycz (POL)
19	Viorel Burduja (MDA)
