= 2015 Dan Kolov & Nikola Petrov Tournament =

Dan Kolov & Nikola Petrov 2015
- Host city: Sofia, Bulgaria
- Dates: 24–26 April

Champions
- Freestyle: Bulgaria
- Greco-Roman: Bulgaria
- Women: Turkey

The 53rd Dan Kolov & Nikola Petrov Tournament was a sport wrestling event held in Sofia, Bulgaria between 24 and 26 April 2015.

This international tournament includes competition in both men's and women's freestyle wrestling and men's Greco-Roman wrestling. This tournament is held in honor of Dan Kolov who was the first European freestyle wrestling champion from Bulgaria and European and World Champion Nikola Petroff.

== Event videos ==
The event was aired freely on the Bulgarian Wrestling Federation Live YouTube channel.

Broadcast
24 April 2015-Finals	25 April 2015-Finals	26 April 2015-Finals

== Medal table ==
Rank	Nation	Gold	Silver	Bronze	Total
1	Bulgaria	8	8	9	25
2	Iran	2	2	3	7
3	Armenia	2	2	2	6
4	Romania	2	1	7	10
5	Turkey	2	1	6	9
6	Sweden	2	0	0	2
7	Germany	1	2	2	5
8	Azerbaijan	1	2	1	4
9	Slovakia	1	0	2	3
10	Hungary	1	0	1	2
11	Canada	1	0	0	1
11	Kazakhstan	1	0	0	1
13	Egypt	0	3	3	6
14	Ukraine	0	1	4	5
15	Italy	0	1	1	2
15	Senegal	0	1	1	2
17	Norway	0	0	2	2
18	Algeria	0	0	1	1
18	Belarus	0	0	1	1
18	Latvia	0	0	1	1
18	Macedonia	0	0	1	1
Totals (21 entries)		24	24	48	96

== Medal overview ==
=== Men's freestyle ===
Event	Gold	Silver	Bronze
57 kg	Vladimir Dubov; Bulgaria	Reza Atri; Iran	Andrei Dukov; Romania
57 kg	Vladimir Dubov; Bulgaria	Reza Atri; Iran	Marin Filip; Romania
61 kg	Ivan Guidea; Romania	Shukri Shukriev; Bulgaria	Nikolai Bolotnyuk; Slovakia
61 kg	Ivan Guidea; Romania	Shukri Shukriev; Bulgaria	Stoyan Iliev; Bulgaria
65 kg	Borislav Novachkov; Bulgaria	Nikolay Kurtev; Bulgaria	Aliashgar Jebeli; Iran
65 kg	Borislav Novachkov; Bulgaria	Nikolay Kurtev; Bulgaria	Dejan Mitrov; Macedonia
70 kg	Miroslav Kirov; Bulgaria	Lennard Wickel; Germany	Ibrahim Eyad; Egypt
70 kg	Miroslav Kirov; Bulgaria	Lennard Wickel; Germany	Georgi Zlatov; Bulgaria
74 kg	Ablaikhan Khussainov; Kazakhstan	Marius Atofanin; Romania	Michal Duba; Slovakia
74 kg	Ablaikhan Khussainov; Kazakhstan	Marius Atofanin; Romania	Georgi Ivanov; Bulgaria
86 kg	William Harth; Germany	Georgi Sredkov; Bulgaria	Gheorghiță Ștefan; Romania
86 kg	William Harth; Germany	Georgi Sredkov; Bulgaria	Mohamed Zaghloul; Egypt
97 kg	Dragomir Stoychev; Bulgaria	Georg Gabriel Stark; Germany	Imants Lagodskis; Latvia
97 kg	Dragomir Stoychev; Bulgaria	Georg Gabriel Stark; Germany	Yusup Jalilav; Belarus
125 kg	Alin Alexuc-Ciurariu; Romania	Abdellatif Mohamed; Egypt	Ali Nail Arslan; Turkey
125 kg	Alin Alexuc-Ciurariu; Romania	Abdellatif Mohamed; Egypt	Miloslav Metodiev; Bulgaria

=== Greco-Roman ===
Event	Gold	Silver	Bronze
59 kg	Ivo Angelov; Bulgaria	Aleksandar Kostadinov; Bulgaria	Fatih Üçüncü; Turkey
59 kg	Ivo Angelov; Bulgaria	Aleksandar Kostadinov; Bulgaria	Virgil Munteanu; Romania
66 kg	Konstantin Stas; Bulgaria	Hassan Ibrahim; Egypt	Abdulsamet Uğurlu; Turkey
66 kg	Konstantin Stas; Bulgaria	Hassan Ibrahim; Egypt	Omid Norouzi; Iran
71 kg	Afshin Biabangard; Iran	Rafael Aleksanyan; Armenia	Tomi Hinoveanu; Romania
71 kg	Afshin Biabangard; Iran	Rafael Aleksanyan; Armenia	Petter Karlsen; Norway
75 kg	Arsen Julfalakyan; Armenia	Ilian Georgiev; Bulgaria	Karapet Chalyan; Armenia
75 kg	Arsen Julfalakyan; Armenia	Ilian Georgiev; Bulgaria	Yavor Yanakiev; Bulgaria
80 kg	Daniel Aleksandrov; Bulgaria	Tarek Sheble Mohamed; Egypt	Eduard Sargsyan; Armenia
80 kg	Daniel Aleksandrov; Bulgaria	Tarek Sheble Mohamed; Egypt	Bachir Sid Azara; Algeria
85 kg	Habibollah Akhlaghi; Iran	Maksim Manukyan; Armenia	Hristo Marinov; Bulgaria
85 kg	Habibollah Akhlaghi; Iran	Maksim Manukyan; Armenia	Metehan Başar; Turkey
98 kg	Artur Aleksanyan; Armenia	Daigoro Timoncini; Italy	Seyedmostafa Salehizadeh; Iran
98 kg	Artur Aleksanyan; Armenia	Daigoro Timoncini; Italy	Vladislav Metodiev; Bulgaria
130 kg	Soslan Gagloev; Slovakia	Yadollah Mohebi; Iran	Dimitar Kumchev; Bulgaria
130 kg	Soslan Gagloev; Slovakia	Yadollah Mohebi; Iran	Rareș Chintoan; Romania

=== Women's freestyle ===
Event	Gold	Silver	Bronze
48 kg	Jessica MacDonald; Canada	Natalya Pulkovska; Ukraine	Madalina Linguraru; Romania
48 kg	Jessica MacDonald; Canada	Natalya Pulkovska; Ukraine	Evin Demirhan; Turkey
53 kg	Sofia Mattsson; Sweden	Isabelle Sambou; Senegal	Yuliya Khavaldzhy; Ukraine
53 kg	Sofia Mattsson; Sweden	Isabelle Sambou; Senegal	Olga Shnaider; Ukraine
55 kg	Nataliya Synyshyn; Azerbaijan	Alyona Kolesnik; Azerbaijan	Bilyana Dudova; Bulgaria
55 kg	Nataliya Synyshyn; Azerbaijan	Alyona Kolesnik; Azerbaijan	Laura Mertens; Germany
58 kg	Emese Barka; Hungary	Mimi Hristova; Bulgaria	Marianna Sastin; Hungary
58 kg	Emese Barka; Hungary	Mimi Hristova; Bulgaria	Tatyana Omelchenko; Ukraine
60 kg	Elif Jale Yeşilırmak; Turkey	Viktoria Bobeva; Bulgaria	Karoline Loevik; Norway
60 kg	Elif Jale Yeşilırmak; Turkey	Viktoria Bobeva; Bulgaria	Hafize Şahin; Turkey
63 kg	Buse Tosun; Turkey	Elina Vaseva; Bulgaria	Dalma Caneva; Italy
63 kg	Buse Tosun; Turkey	Elina Vaseva; Bulgaria	Anta Sambou; Senegal
69 kg	Jenny Fransson; Sweden	Nadeshda Mushka; Azerbaijan	Elis Manolova; Azerbaijan
69 kg	Jenny Fransson; Sweden	Nadeshda Mushka; Azerbaijan	Alina Berezhna; Ukraine
76 kg	Stanka Zlateva; Bulgaria	Yasemin Adar; Turkey	Maria Selmaier; Germany
76 kg	Stanka Zlateva; Bulgaria	Yasemin Adar; Turkey	Nadia Antar; Egypt

== Participating nations ==
299 competitors from 28 nations participated.

- Albania (1)
- Algeria (11)
- Armenia (11)
- Azerbaijan (9)
- Belarus (1)
- Bulgaria (66)
- Canada (1)
- Egypt (14)
- France (1)
- Germany (22)
- Greece (1)
- Hungary (5)
- Iran (9)
- Israel (5)
- Italy (15)
- Kazakhstan (3)
- Kosovo (2)
- Latvia (2)
- Macedonia (5)
- Norway (7)
- Romania (24)
- Serbia (3)
- Slovakia (6)
- Sweden (3)
- Tunisia (16)
- Turkey (23)
- Ukraine (14)
- United World Wrestling (9)
