= Chakvetadze =

Chakvetadze (Georgian: ჩაკვეტაძე) is a Georgian surname. Notable people with the surname include:

- Anna Chakvetadze, Russian tennis player with Georgian origin
- Davit Chakvetadze, Georgian-born Russian Greco-Roman wrestler
- Giorgi Chakvetadze, Georgian footballer
