= Wrestling at the 2024 Summer Olympics – Men's Greco-Roman 97 kg =

Men's Greco-Roman 97 kg at the Games of the XXXIII Olympiad
- Venue: Grand Palais Éphémère
- Date: 6–7 August 2024
- Competitors: 16 from 16 nations

Medalists
| 1st place, gold medalist(s) | | Mohammad Hadi Saravi | Iran |
| 2nd place, silver medalist(s) | | Artur Aleksanyan | Armenia |
| 3rd place, bronze medalist(s) | | Gabriel Rosillo | Cuba |
| 3rd place, bronze medalist(s) | | Uzur Dzhuzupbekov | Kyrgyzstan |

Men's Greco-Roman 97 kg competition at the 2024 Summer Olympics in Paris, France, took place on 6–7 August 2024 at the Grand Palais Éphémère in Champ de Mars.

== Background ==
This was the 25th appearance of the men's Greco-Roman heavyweight, debut in 1912 and it has appeared in every games since then

- 1912-28: +82.5kg
- 1932-1960: +87kg
- 1964-1968: +97kg
- 1972-1996: 100kg
- 2000: 97kg
- 2004-2012: 96kg
- 2016:98kg
- 2020-current: 97kg

Returned 2020 bronze medalist Mohammad Hadi Saravi won the event by defeating 2016 Olympic champion Artur Aleksanyan in the final, Uzur Dzhuzupbekov and Gabriel Rosillo won the bronze medals with Dzhuzupbekov going through repechage.

== Format ==
This Greco-Roman competition consists of a single-elimination tournament, with a repechage used to determine the winner of two bronze medals. The two finalists face off for gold and silver medals. Each wrestler who loses to one of the two finalists moves into the repechage, culminating in a pair of bronze medal matches featuring the semifinal losers each facing the remaining repechage opponent from their half of the bracket.

== Rules ==
A typical bout consists of two halves of three minutes each separated by a 30-second break. The two competitors compete on a mat, which is nine meters in diameter. Wrestlers try to score points by executing various legal maneuvers. Points ranging from one to five are awarded by the mat referee depending on the degree of difficulty of the maneuvers. Points are also awarded to the opponent in case of infractions such as illegal holds, passivity etc. A wrestler is automatically disqualified if three cautions are awarded during a bout. Forcing an opponent's shoulders to the mat results in an instant victory by fall.

During the course of a match, if a wrestler builds a 10-point advantage over the opponent, the bout is stopped and the leader is declared as the winner by technical superiority. The total scores are totaled at the end of the stipulated six-minute period, and the wrestler with the maximum points wins. In case of a tie, the wrestler who has scored the last point is declared the winner. A competitor might also be declared a winner if the opponent does not turn up or is medically unfit to compete.

== Qualification ==
Sixteen quota places were available with each nation restricted to a maximum of one spot. Five quota places were awarded at the 2023 World Wrestling Championships, which took place from the 16th to 24th of September in Belgrade, Serbia. The finalists of each category in the four continental qualification tournaments (Asia, Europe, the Americas, and the joint Africa & Oceania) were awarded quota places. The remainder of the total quota was allocated at the 2024 World Wrestling Olympic Qualification Tournament, offering a minimum of three quota places.

== Schedule ==
All times are Central European Time (UTC+02:00)

| Date | Time | Event |
|---|---|---|
| 6 August 2024 | 11:00 | Qualification rounds |
| 6 August 2024 | 18:15 | Semifinals |
| 7 August 2024 | 11:00 | Repechage |
| 7 August 2024 | 18:15 | Finals |

== Results ==
Sixteen athletes qualified for the competition.

Legend

- F — Won by fall
- R — Retired

=== Main bracket ===
Round of 16
Artur Aleksanyan (ARM) | 9
Kim Seung-jun (KOR) | 0
Rustam Assakalov (UZB) | 5
Kevin Mejía (HON) | 3
Arvi Savolainen (FIN) | 4
Fadi Rouabah (ALG) | 0
Lucas Lazogianis (GER) | 5
Gabriel Rosillo (CUB) | 7
Mohammad Hadi Saravi (IRI) | 10
Joe Rau (USA) | 1
Uzur Dzhuzupbekov (KGZ) | 5
Mindaugas Venckaitis (LTU) | 1
Mikheil Kajaia (SRB) | 1
Mohamed Gabr (EGY) | 6
Robert Kobliashvili (GEO) | 1
Abubakar Khaslakhanau (AIN) | 9

Quarterfinals
Artur Aleksanyan (ARM) | 9
Rustam Assakalov (UZB) | 5
Arvi Savolainen (FIN) | 2
Gabriel Rosillo (CUB) | 5
Mohammad Hadi Saravi (IRI) | 8
Uzur Dzhuzupbekov (KGZ) | 0
Mohamed Gabr (EGY) | 4
Abubakar Khaslakhanau (AIN) | 1

Semifinals
Artur Aleksanyan (ARM) | 5
Gabriel Rosillo (CUB) | 3
Mohammad Hadi Saravi (IRI) | 6
Mohamed Gabr (EGY) | 0

Final
Artur Aleksanyan (ARM) | 1
Mohammad Hadi Saravi (IRI) | 4

=== Repechage ===
Repechage
Kim Seung-jun (KOR) | 2
Rustam Assakalov (UZB) | 8
Joe Rau (USA) | 4
Uzur Dzhuzupbekov (KGZ) | 9

Bronze medal matches
Rustam Assakalov (UZB) | 0^{R}
Gabriel Rosillo (CUB) | 2
Uzur Dzhuzupbekov (KGZ) | 2
Mohamed Gabr (EGY) | 1

== Final standing ==
| Rank | Athlete |
|---|---|
| 1st place, gold medalist(s) | Mohammad Hadi Saravi (IRI) |
| 2nd place, silver medalist(s) | Artur Aleksanyan (ARM) |
| 3rd place, bronze medalist(s) | Gabriel Rosillo (CUB) |
| 3rd place, bronze medalist(s) | Uzur Dzhuzupbekov (KGZ) |
| 5 | Rustam Assakalov (UZB) |
| 5 | Mohamed Gabr (EGY) |
| 7 | Abubakar Khaslakhanau (AIN) |
| 8 | Arvi Savolainen (FIN) |
| 9 | Joe Rau (USA) |
| 10 | Lucas Lazogianis (GER) |
| 11 | Kevin Mejía (HON) |
| 12 | Kim Seung-jun (KOR) |
| 13 | Mindaugas Venckaitis (LTU) |
| 14 | Mikheil Kajaia (SRB) |
| 15 | Robert Kobliashvili (GEO) |
| 16 | Fadi Rouabah (ALG) |
