= Nursultan Tursynov =

Kazakhstani Greco-Roman wrestler

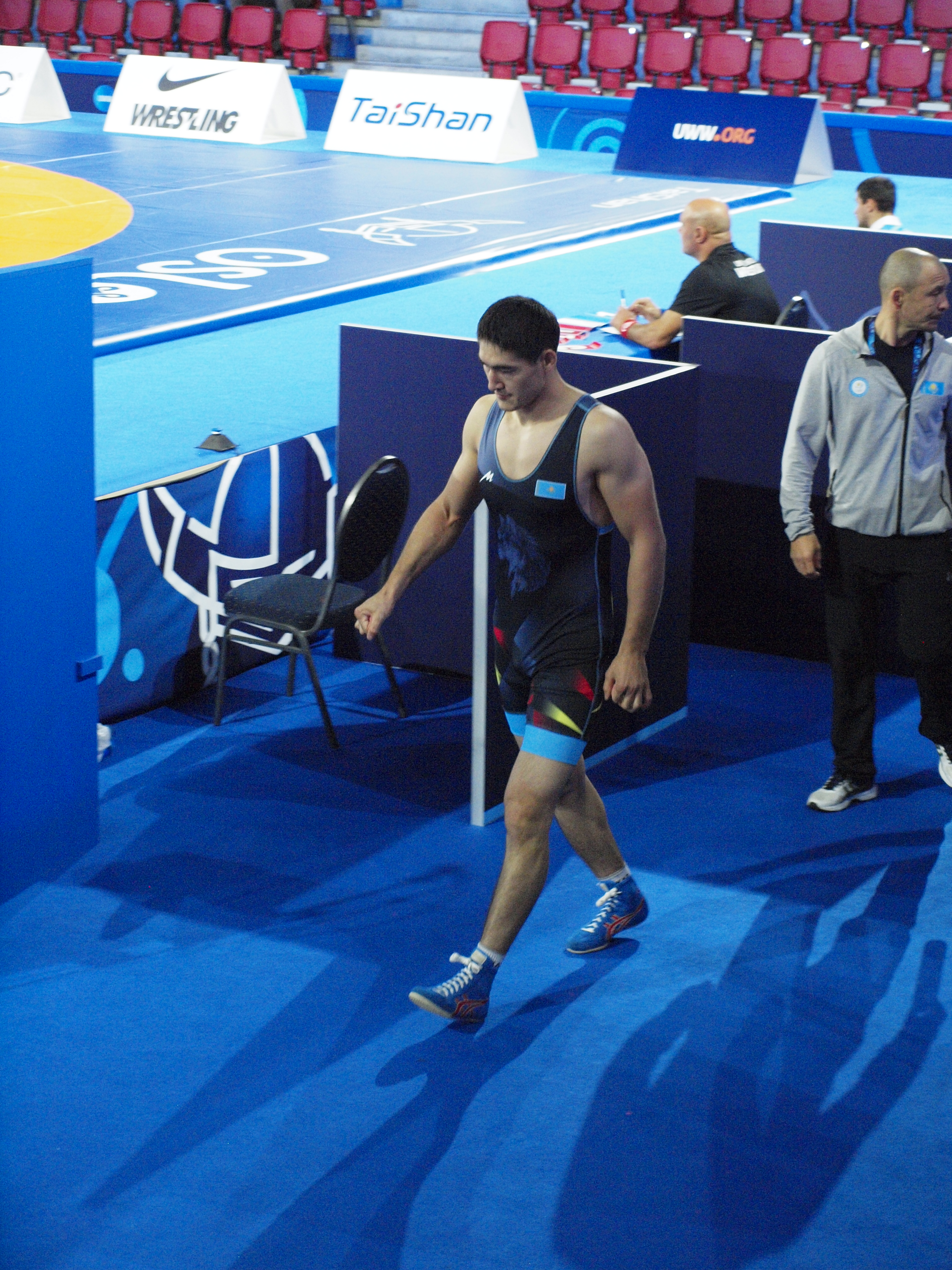
- Tursynov at the 2021 World Wrestling Championships in Oslo, Norway

Personal information
- Native name: Нұрсұлтан Тұрсынов
- Born: 30 January 1991 (age 35) Semipalatinsk, Kazakhstan
- Height: 184 cm (6 ft 0 in)

Sport
- Country: Kazakhstan
- Sport: Amateur wrestling
- Weight class: 87 kg
- Event: Greco-Roman
Medal record
Men's Greco-Roman wrestling
Representing Kazakhstan
Asian Championships
Gold medal – first place	2014 Astana	85 kg
Silver medal – second place	2015 Doha	85 kg
Silver medal – second place	2023 Astana	87 kg
Bronze medal – third place	2022 Ulaanbaatar	87 kg
Bronze medal – third place	2026 Bishkek	87 kg

Nursultan Tursynov (born 30 January 1991) is a Kazakhstani Greco-Roman wrestler. He won the gold medal in the men's 85 kg event at the 2014 Asian Wrestling Championships in Astana, Kazakhstan and the silver medal in this event at the 2015 Asian Wrestling Championships in Doha, Qatar.

Tursynov represented Kazakhstan at the 2020 Summer Olympics in Tokyo, Japan. He competed in the 87 kg event. He also competed at the 2024 Summer Olympics in Paris, France.

== Career ==
Tursynov competed in the 84 kg event at the 2013 World Wrestling Championships held in Budapest, Hungary. In 2014, he lost his bronze medal match in the 85 kg event at the Asian Games held in Incheon, South Korea.

In 2015, Tursynov was eliminated in his third match in the 85 kg event at the World Wrestling Championships held in Las Vegas, United States.

He competed in the 87 kg event at the 2022 World Wrestling Championships held in Belgrade, Serbia. He was eliminated in his third match.

Tursynov competed in the 87 kg event at the 2024 Summer Olympics in Paris, France.

== Achievements ==
Year	Tournament	Location	Result	Event
2014	Asian Championships	Astana, Kazakhstan	1st	Greco-Roman 85 kg
2015	Asian Championships	Doha, Qatar	2nd	Greco-Roman 85 kg
2022	Asian Championships	Ulaanbaatar, Mongolia	3rd	Greco-Roman 87 kg
2023	Asian Championships	Astana, Kazakhstan	2nd	Greco-Roman 87 kg
