= 2014 European Wrestling Championships =

2014 European Championship
- Host city: Vantaa, Finland
- Dates: 1–6 April
- Stadium: Trio Areena

Champions
- Freestyle: Russia
- Greco-Roman: Russia
- Women: Russia

The 2014 European Wrestling Championships was held in Vantaa, Finland, from 1 April to 6 April 2014.

== Medal table ==
| Rank | Nation | Gold | Silver | Bronze | Total |
|---|---|---|---|---|---|
| 1 | Russia (RUS) | 9 | 2 | 5 | 16 |
| 2 | Azerbaijan (AZE) | 3 | 5 | 2 | 10 |
| 3 | Turkey (TUR) | 2 | 4 | 3 | 9 |
| 4 | Bulgaria (BUL) | 2 | 1 | 6 | 9 |
| 5 | Sweden (SWE) | 2 | 0 | 3 | 5 |
| 6 | Hungary (HUN) | 2 | 0 | 2 | 4 |
| 7 | Armenia (ARM) | 1 | 2 | 2 | 5 |
| 8 | Ukraine (UKR) | 1 | 1 | 6 | 8 |
| 9 | Georgia (GEO) | 1 | 0 | 2 | 3 |
| 10 | Latvia (LAT) | 1 | 0 | 1 | 2 |
| 11 | Belarus (BLR) | 0 | 3 | 2 | 5 |
| 12 | Moldova (MDA) | 0 | 1 | 3 | 4 |
| 13 | Poland (POL) | 0 | 1 | 2 | 3 |
| 14 | Finland (FIN) | 0 | 1 | 1 | 2 |
| 15 | Greece (GRE) | 0 | 1 | 0 | 1 |
| 15 | Israel (ISR) | 0 | 1 | 0 | 1 |
| 15 | Monaco (MON) | 0 | 1 | 0 | 1 |
| 18 | Austria (AUT) | 0 | 0 | 1 | 1 |
| 18 | Denmark (DEN) | 0 | 0 | 1 | 1 |
| 18 | France (FRA) | 0 | 0 | 1 | 1 |
| 18 | Germany (GER) | 0 | 0 | 1 | 1 |
| 18 | Great Britain (GBR) | 0 | 0 | 1 | 1 |
| 18 | Norway (NOR) | 0 | 0 | 1 | 1 |
| 18 | Romania (ROU) | 0 | 0 | 1 | 1 |
| 18 | Slovakia (SVK) | 0 | 0 | 1 | 1 |
| Totals (25 entries) | | 24 | 24 | 48 | 96 |

== Team ranking ==
Team qualified for European Nation's Cup

| Rank | Men's freestyle | | Men's Greco-Roman | | Women's freestyle | |
| Rank | Team | Points | Team | Points | Team | Points |
|---|---|---|---|---|---|---|
| 1 | Russia | 68 | Russia | 54 | Russia | 62 |
| 2 | Azerbaijan | 47 | Turkey | 46 | Bulgaria | 45 |
| 3 | Turkey | 40 | Azerbaijan | 38 | Ukraine | 41 |
| 4 | Belarus | 38 | Hungary | 35 | Sweden | 34 |
| 5 | Georgia | 36 | Ukraine | 32 | Belarus | 33 |
| 6 | Armenia | 34 | Sweden | 28 | Azerbaijan | 29 |
| 7 | Ukraine | 31 | Armenia | 26 | Turkey | 29 |
| 8 | Hungary | 26 | Bulgaria | 22 | Poland | 24 |
| 9 | Bulgaria | 24 | Germany | 20 | Romania | 21 |
| 10 | Poland | 18 | Belarus | 19 | Hungary | 21 |

== Medal summary ==
=== Men's freestyle ===
| Event | Gold | Silver | Bronze |
|---|---|---|---|
| 57 kg | Vladimer Khinchegashvili; Georgia | Ghenadie Tulbea; Monaco | Garik Barseghyan; Armenia |
| 57 kg | Vladimer Khinchegashvili; Georgia | Ghenadie Tulbea; Monaco | Zoheir El-Ouarraqe; France |
| 61 kg | Haji Aliyev; Azerbaijan | Bekkhan Goygereyev; Russia | Andrei Perpeliță; Moldova |
| 61 kg | Haji Aliyev; Azerbaijan | Bekkhan Goygereyev; Russia | Vasyl Shuptar; Ukraine |
| 65 kg | Magomed Kurbanaliev; Russia | Servet Coşkun; Turkey | Borislav Novachkov; Bulgaria |
| 65 kg | Magomed Kurbanaliev; Russia | Servet Coşkun; Turkey | Konstantine Khabalashvili; Georgia |
| 70 kg | Ruslan Dibirghadzhiyev; Azerbaijan | Grigor Grigoryan; Armenia | Miroslav Kirov; Bulgaria |
| 70 kg | Ruslan Dibirghadzhiyev; Azerbaijan | Grigor Grigoryan; Armenia | Yakup Gör; Turkey |
| 74 kg | Aniuar Geduev; Russia | Jabrayil Hasanov; Azerbaijan | Soner Demirtaş; Turkey |
| 74 kg | Aniuar Geduev; Russia | Jabrayil Hasanov; Azerbaijan | Krystian Brzozowski; Poland |
| 86 kg | Abdulrashid Sadulaev; Russia | Murad Gaidarov; Belarus | Musa Murtazaliev; Armenia |
| 86 kg | Abdulrashid Sadulaev; Russia | Murad Gaidarov; Belarus | István Veréb; Hungary |
| 97 kg | Abdusalam Gadisov; Russia | Khetag Gazyumov; Azerbaijan | Ivan Yankouski; Belarus |
| 97 kg | Abdusalam Gadisov; Russia | Khetag Gazyumov; Azerbaijan | Nicolai Ceban; Moldova |
| 125 kg | Taha Akgül; Turkey | Alan Khugayev; Russia | Oleksandr Khotsianivskyi; Ukraine |
| 125 kg | Taha Akgül; Turkey | Alan Khugayev; Russia | Dániel Ligeti; Hungary |

=== Men's Greco-Roman ===
| Event | Gold | Silver | Bronze |
|---|---|---|---|
| 59 kg | Aleksandar Kostadinov; Bulgaria | Victor Ciobanu; Moldova | Kamran Mammadov; Azerbaijan |
| 59 kg | Aleksandar Kostadinov; Bulgaria | Victor Ciobanu; Moldova | Ivan Kuylakov; Russia |
| 66 kg | Adam Kurak; Russia | Hasan Aliyev; Azerbaijan | Frank Stäbler; Germany |
| 66 kg | Adam Kurak; Russia | Hasan Aliyev; Azerbaijan | István Lévai; Slovakia |
| 71 kg | Tamás Lőrincz; Hungary | Rasul Chunayev; Azerbaijan | Yunus Özel; Turkey |
| 71 kg | Tamás Lőrincz; Hungary | Rasul Chunayev; Azerbaijan | Aliaksandr Dzemyanovich; Belarus |
| 75 kg | Alexander Chekhirkin; Russia | Arsen Julfalakyan; Armenia | Elvin Mursaliyev; Azerbaijan |
| 75 kg | Alexander Chekhirkin; Russia | Arsen Julfalakyan; Armenia | Mark Madsen; Denmark |
| 80 kg | Péter Bácsi; Hungary | Selçuk Çebi; Turkey | Giorgi Tsirekidze; Georgia |
| 80 kg | Péter Bácsi; Hungary | Selçuk Çebi; Turkey | Oleksandr Shyshman; Ukraine |
| 85 kg | Zhan Beleniuk; Ukraine | Rami Hietaniemi; Finland | Damian Janikowski; Poland |
| 85 kg | Zhan Beleniuk; Ukraine | Rami Hietaniemi; Finland | Amer Hrustanović; Austria |
| 98 kg | Artur Aleksanyan; Armenia | Cenk İldem; Turkey | Fredrik Schön; Sweden |
| 98 kg | Artur Aleksanyan; Armenia | Cenk İldem; Turkey | Marthin Hamlet Nielsen; Norway |
| 130 kg | Rıza Kayaalp; Turkey | Lyubomir Dimitrov; Bulgaria | Johan Eurén; Sweden |
| 130 kg | Rıza Kayaalp; Turkey | Lyubomir Dimitrov; Bulgaria | Vasily Parshin; Russia |

=== Women's freestyle ===
| Event | Gold | Silver | Bronze |
|---|---|---|---|
| 48 kg | Mariya Stadnyk; Azerbaijan | Nataliya Pulkovska; Ukraine | Fredrika Petersson; Sweden |
| 48 kg | Mariya Stadnyk; Azerbaijan | Nataliya Pulkovska; Ukraine | Nadezda Fedorova; Russia |
| 53 kg | Maria Gurova; Russia | Maria Prevolaraki; Greece | Natalia Budu; Moldova |
| 53 kg | Maria Gurova; Russia | Maria Prevolaraki; Greece | Ana Maria Pavăl; Romania |
| 55 kg | Sofia Mattsson; Sweden | Anna Zwirydowska; Poland | Irina Ologonova; Russia |
| 55 kg | Sofia Mattsson; Sweden | Anna Zwirydowska; Poland | Mimi Hristova; Bulgaria |
| 58 kg | Valeria Koblova; Russia | Irina Netreba; Azerbaijan | Viktoria Bobeva; Bulgaria |
| 58 kg | Valeria Koblova; Russia | Irina Netreba; Azerbaijan | Petra Olli; Finland |
| 60 kg | Johanna Mattsson; Sweden | Hafize Şahin; Turkey | Olga Butkevych; Great Britain |
| 60 kg | Johanna Mattsson; Sweden | Hafize Şahin; Turkey | Taybe Yusein; Bulgaria |
| 63 kg | Anastasija Grigorjeva; Latvia | Maria Mamashuk; Belarus | Yuliya Tkach; Ukraine |
| 63 kg | Anastasija Grigorjeva; Latvia | Maria Mamashuk; Belarus | Dzhanan Manolova; Bulgaria |
| 69 kg | Natalia Vorobieva; Russia | Ilana Kratysh; Israel | Laura Skujiņa; Latvia |
| 69 kg | Natalia Vorobieva; Russia | Ilana Kratysh; Israel | Alina Stadnik; Ukraine |
| 75 kg | Stanka Zlateva; Bulgaria | Vasilisa Marzaliuk; Belarus | Kateryna Burmistrova; Ukraine |
| 75 kg | Stanka Zlateva; Bulgaria | Vasilisa Marzaliuk; Belarus | Ekaterina Bukina; Russia |

== Participating nations ==
445 competitors from 39 nations participated:

- Albania (3)
- Armenia (16)
- Austria (11)
- Azerbaijan (24)
- Belarus (24)
- Bulgaria (22)
- Croatia (5)
- Czech Republic (9)
- Denmark (3)
- Estonia (6)
- Spain (10)
- Finland (15)
- France (12)
- Georgia (16)
- Germany (22)
- United Kingdom (1)
- Greece (13)
- Hungary (21)
- Ireland (1)
- Israel (5)
- Italy (10)
- Latvia (12)
- Lithuania (10)
- Moldova (16)
- North Macedonia (7)
- Monaco (1)
- Montenegro (1)
- Norway (5)
- Poland (17)
- Portugal (5)
- Romania (17)
- Russia (24)
- Serbia (6)
- Slovenia (1)
- Slovakia (9)
- Switzerland (6)
- Sweden (12)
- Turkey (23)
- Ukraine (24)
