= Peng Fei =

Chinese Greco-Roman wrestler

Personal information
- Born: March 6, 1992 (age 34) Xi'an, China

Sport
- Country: China
- Sport: Amateur wrestling
Medal record
Men's Greco-Roman wrestling
Representing China
Men's Greco-Roman
Asian Games
Bronze medal – third place	2014 Incheon	85 kg
Asian Championships
Bronze medal – third place	2018 Bishkek	87 kg
Bronze medal – third place	2017 New Delhi	85 kg

Peng Fei (born March 6, 1992) is a Chinese Greco-Roman wrestler. He competed in the men's Greco-Roman 85 kg event at the 2016 Summer Olympics, in which he was eliminated in the round of 16 by Javid Hamzatau.
