= Ivan Huklek =

Croatian Greco-Roman wrestler

Personal information
- Nationality: Croatian
- Born: 12 November 1996 (age 29) Sesvete, Zagreb, Croatia
- Height: 1.80 m (5 ft 11 in)

Sport
- Sport: Wrestling
- Event: Greco-Roman
Medal record
Men's Greco-Roman wrestling
Representing Croatia
Olympic Games
Bronze medal – third place	2020 Tokyo	87 kg
Mediterranean Games
Gold medal – first place	2026 Taranto	87 kg
World U23 Championships
Silver medal – second place	2017 Bydgoszcz	85 kg
European U23 Championships
Silver medal – second place	2018 Istanbul	87 kg

Ivan Huklek (born 12 November 1996) is a Croatian Greco-Roman wrestler.

== Career ==
In 2017, Huklek won the silver medal at the 2017 World U23 Wrestling Championship in Bydgoszcz in the 85 kg category. In 2018, he won the silver medal in the men's 87 kg event at the 2018 European U23 Wrestling Championship held in Istanbul, Turkey. Huklek obtained one of the remaining slots in the men's Greco-Roman 87 kg at the 2021 World Qualification Tournament in Sofia, Bulgaria.

He competed at the 2024 European Wrestling Olympic Qualification Tournament in Baku, Azerbaijan hoping to qualify for the 2024 Summer Olympics in Paris, France. He was eliminated in his first match and he did not qualify for the Olympics. Huklek also competed at the 2024 World Wrestling Olympic Qualification Tournament held in Istanbul, Turkey without qualifying for the Olympics.

On 21 November 2025, Zurabi Datunashvili's appeal was rejected by the Court of Arbitration for Sport and he was stripped of the Olympic bronze medal. The medal was subsequently awarded to Croatia's Ivan Huklek.
