= Damian Janikowski =

Polish wrestler and mixed martial arts (MMA) fighter

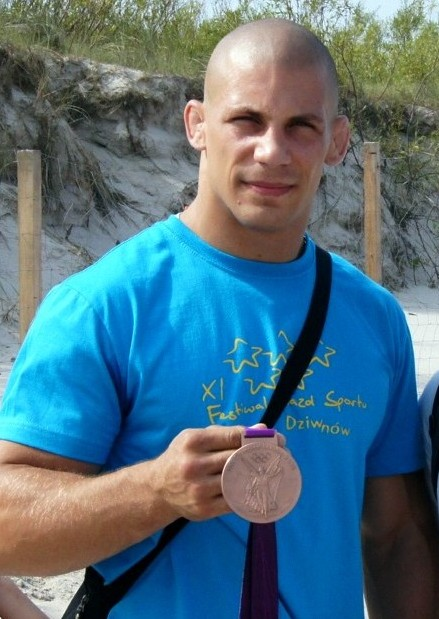
- Janikowski in 2012
- Born: 27 June 1989 (age 37); Wrocław, Poland
- Height: 5 ft 11 in (1.80 m)
- Weight: 186 lb (84 kg; 13.3 st)
- Division: Middleweight
- Reach: 70.9 in (180 cm)
- Style: Wrestling
- Fighting out of: Warsaw, Poland
- Team: WCA Fight Team
- Years active: 2017–present

Mixed martial arts record
- Total: 18
- Wins: 10
- By knockout: 5
- By submission: 1
- By decision: 4
- Losses: 8
- By knockout: 5
- By submission: 1
- By decision: 2

Other information
- Mixed martial arts record from Sherdog

Damian Janikowski (born 27 June 1989) is a Polish mixed martial artist and former wrestler who won the bronze medal at the 2012 London Olympics in the Greco-Roman 84 kg category. He is currently ranked #2 in the KSW Middleweight rankings.

== Wrestling career ==
At the 2011 World Championships, he won the silver medal in the 84 kg men's Greco-Roman division. He beat Pedro Garcia Perez, Alan Khugaev, Eerik Aps and Nazmi Avluca before losing to Alim Selimov in the final.

At the 2012 European Championships, he beat Zhan Belenyuk, Jim Petterson and Andrea Minguzzi, before losing to Hristo Marinov.

Janikowski represented his native Poland at the 2012 Summer Olympics in London where he won the bronze medal. He beat Nazmi Avluca in the first round, Amer Hrustanović in the next and Pablo Shorey in the quarter final before losing to Karam Gaber in the semifinal. Janikowski was entered in to the repechage, where he beat Mélonin Noumonvi to win his bronze medal. He is 180 centimetres (5 ft 11 in) tall and weighs 85 kilograms (187 lb).

At the 2014 European Championships, he beat Javid Hamzatov before losing to Rami Hietaniemi. Because Hietaniemi reached the semifinals, Janikowski was entered into the repechage. In the repechage, he beat Ahmet Yildirim, Jim Petterson and Robert Kobliashvili, before beating Jan Fischer to win his bronze medal.

== Mixed martial arts career ==
In 2017, Janikowski opted to try his hand at mixed martial arts and signed with the Konfrontacja Sztuk Walki organization. He made his debut at KSW 39 on 27 May 2017. He faced Julio Gallegos and won the fight via TKO due to knees and punches in the first round.

Janikowski faced Szymon Kołecki at KSW 52 on 7 December 2019. He lost the fight via a second round knockout.

Damian faced Andreas Gustafsson at KSW 55: Askham vs. Khalidov 2. He won the fight via split decision.

Janikowski faced Jason Radcliffe at KSW 59 on 20 March 2021. He won the bout via TKO in the second round.

Janikowski faced ex-UFC fighter Paweł Pawlak in his KSW debut on 4 September 2021 at KSW 63: Soldić vs. Kincl. He lost the bout via unanimous decision.

Janikowski faced Tomasz Jakubiec on 19 March 2022 at KSW 68: Parnasse vs. Rutkowski. He won the bout in the first round, knocking Jakubiec unconscious.

Janikowski faced Tom Breese on 10 September 2022 at KSW 74, controversially losing via guillotine choke in the second round, with the bout being stopped after the ref thought that Janikowski tapped when he said he didn't.

Janikowski faced Cezary Kęsik on 15 July 2023, at KSW 84: De Fries vs. Bajor. He won the bout via unanimous decision.

Janikowski faced Tomasz Romanowski on 16 December 2023 at KSW 89: Bartosiński vs. Parnasse, winning the bout via unanimous decision.

On 20 July 2024, in the main event of KSW 96: Pawlak vs. Janikowski 2, he had a rematch with Paweł Pawlak, with the KSW Middleweight Championship at stake. He again lost to his rival by unanimous decision on the scorecards.

== Mixed martial arts record ==
Professional record breakdown
20 matches	11 wins	9 losses
By knockout	6	6
By submission	1	1
By decision	4	2

Res.	Record	Opponent	Method	Event	Date	Round	Time	Location	Notes
Win	11–9	Wiktor Zalewski	Submission (scarf hold)	KSW 119	June 20, 2026	1	2:20	Radom, Poland	
Loss	10–9	Michał Michalski	TKO (punches)	KSW 113	20 December 2025	1	4:19	Łódź, Poland	
Loss	10–8	Laïd Zerhouni	KO (punches)	KSW 106	10 May 2025	1	1:54	Lyon, France	
Loss	10–7	Piotr Kuberski	TKO (punches)	KSW 100	16 November 2024	2	0:44	Gliwice, Poland	Fight of the Night.
Loss	10–6	Paweł Pawlak	Decision (unanimous)	KSW 96	20 July 2024	5	5:00	Łódź, Poland	For the KSW Middleweight Championship.
Win	10–5	Tomasz Romanowski	Decision (unanimous)	KSW 89	16 December 2023	3	5:00	Gliwice, Poland	Fight of the Night.
Win	9–5	Cezary Kęsik	Decision (unanimous)	KSW 84	15 July 2023	3	5:00	Gdynia, Poland	
Win	8–5	Mateusz Kubiszyn	Decision (unanimous)	HIGH League 5	10 December 2022	3	3:00	Łódź, Poland	Catchweight (198 lb) bout.
Loss	7–5	Tom Breese	Submission (guillotine choke)	KSW 74	10 September 2022	2	1:53	Ostrów Wielkopolski, Poland	
Win	7–4	Tomasz Jakubiec	KO (punch)	KSW 68	19 March 2022	1	3:42	Radom, Poland	Knockout of the Night. Fight of the Night.
Loss	6–4	Paweł Pawlak	Decision (unanimous)	KSW 63	4 September 2021	3	5:00	Warsaw, Poland	Fight of the Night.
Win	6–3	Jason Radcliffe	TKO (punches)	KSW 59	20 March 2021	2	4:41	Łódź, Poland	
Win	5–3	Andreas Berg Gustafsson	Decision (split)	KSW 55	10 October 2020	3	5:00	Łódź, Poland	
Loss	4–3	Szymon Kołecki	TKO (punches)	KSW 52	7 December 2019	2	3:03	Gliwice, Poland	Catchweight (202 lb) bout.
Win	4–2	Tony Giles	Submission (verbal)	KSW 50	September 2019	1	1:24	London, England	
Loss	3–2	Aleksandar Ilić	KO (head kick)	KSW 47	23 March 2019	3	0:23	Łódź, Poland	
Loss	3–1	Michał Materla	TKO (punches)	KSW 45	6 October 2018	1	3:10	London, England	KSW Middleweight Tournament Semifinal.
Win	3–0	Yannick Bahati	TKO (punches)	KSW 43	14 April 2018	1	0:18	Warsaw, Poland	
Win	2–0	Antoni Chmielewski	TKO (punches)	KSW 41	23 December 2017	2	2:33	Katowice, Poland	
Win	1–0	Julio Gallegos	TKO (knee and punches)	KSW 39	27 May 2017	1	1:26	Warsaw, Poland	Middleweight debut; Gallegos missed weight (187.1 lb).

== See also ==
- List of current KSW fighters
- List of male mixed martial artists
