= Ahmed Othman =

Egyptian wrestler

Sport
- Country: Egypt
- Sport: Greco-Roman wrestling

Ahmed Othman (born February 25, 1989) is an Egyptian Greco-Roman wrestler. He competed in the men's Greco-Roman 85 kg event at the 2016 Summer Olympics, in which he was eliminated in the repechage by Nikolay Bayryakov.
