= Denis Kudla (wrestler) =

German Greco-Roman wrestler

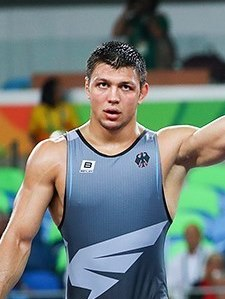
- Kudla at the 2016 Summer Olympics

Personal information
- Full name: Denis Maksymilian Kudla
- Nationality: German
- Born: 24 December 1994 (age 31) Racibórz, Poland
- Height: 1.84 m (6 ft 0 in)
- Weight: 90 kg (198 lb)

Sport
- Sport: Wrestling
- Event: Greco-Roman
- Club: VFK 07 Schifferstadt
- Coached by: Markus Scherer; Michael Carl
Medal record
Men's Greco-Roman wrestling
Representing Germany
Olympic Games
Bronze medal – third place	2016 Rio de Janeiro	85 kg
Bronze medal – third place	2020 Tokyo	87 kg
World Championships
Silver medal – second place	2017 Paris	85 kg
Bronze medal – third place	2019 Nur-Sultan	87 kg
European Championships
Bronze medal – third place	2016 Riga	85 kg
Bronze medal – third place	2018 Kaspiysk	87 kg
Bronze medal – third place	2019 Bucharest	87 kg

Denis Maksymilian Kudla (born 24 December 1994) is a German Greco-Roman wrestler. He won a bronze medal at the 2016 European Wrestling Championships. Kudla won a bronze medal at the 2016 Summer Olympics at 85 kg. He lost to eventual winner Davit Chakvetadze of Russia.
