= Dimitrios Tsekeridis =

Greek Greco-Roman wrestler

Personal information
- Nationality: Greek
- Born: 10 November 1994 (age 31)
- Height: 1.79 m (5 ft 10 in)
- Weight: 88 kg (194 lb)

Sport
- Country: Greece
- Sport: Wrestling
- Event: Greco-Roman
Medal record
Mediterranean Games
Bronze medal – third place	2018 Tarragona	−87 kg

Dimitrios Tsekeridis is a Greek Greco-Roman wrestler. He also won a bronze medal for Greece, at the 2018 Mediterranean Games.
