= Alfonso Leyva =

Mexican wrestler and mixed martial artist

- Born: 6 January 1993 (age 33); Guadalajara, Mexico
- Other names: Alfonso Antonio Leyva Yepez
- Nickname: Sniper
- Height: 5 ft 11 in (180 cm)
- Weight: 170 lb (77 kg; 12 st 2 lb)
- Division: Welterweight (2022–present); Middleweight; Light Heavyweight
- Team: Entram Gym (2020–present)
- Rank: Blue belt in Brazilian jiu-jitsu under Raúl Arvizu
- Wrestling: Olympic Greco-Roman Wrestling
- Years active: 2006–2020 (wrestling); 2020–present (MMA)

Mixed martial arts record
- Total: 13
- Wins: 10
- By knockout: 9
- By decision: 1
- Losses: 3
- By knockout: 2
- By submission: 1

Other information
- Mixed martial arts record from Sherdog

Alfonso Antonio Leyva Yepez (born January 6, 1993) is a Mexican Greco-Roman wrestler and mixed martial artist. He is the current middleweight champion of Ultimate Warrior Challenge Mexico.

== Wrestling career ==
He competed in the men's Greco-Roman 85 kg event at the 2016 Summer Olympics, in which he was eliminated in the round of 32 by Robert Kobliashvili.

After claiming second place in 2019 Pan American Games, Leyva competed in the men's Greco-Roman 77 kg event at the 2020 Summer Olympics. In the round of 16, Leyva was eliminated from the tournament against Aleksandr Chekhirkin.

== Mixed martial arts career ==
After retiring from wrestling after the 2020 Summer Olympics due to lack of support, he announced transition to mixed martial arts. Skipping the amateur career, he went professional and has racked a 5–0 record in the Mexican promotion Ultimate Warrior Challenge Mexico.

Leyva made his stateside debut against Daniel Reis at LFA 135 on July 8, 2022. He won the fight via second-round technical knockout.

On June 7, 2026, Leyva won his first MMA championship after defeating Thales Adriel with a TKO in the first round during a UWC Middleweight Championship fight at the UWC Mexico 58 event.

== Championships and accomplishments ==
- Ultimate Warrior Challenge Mexico
  - UWC Middleweight Championship (One time)

== Mixed martial arts record ==
Professional record breakdown
13 matches	10 wins	3 losses
By knockout	9	2
By submission	0	1
By decision	1	0

Res.	Record	Opponent	Method	Event	Date	Round	Time	Location	Notes
Win	10–3	Nayib López	KO (punches)	UWC Mexico 59	August 30, 2026	1	2:00	Tijuana, Mexico	Won the vacant UWC Welterweight Championship.
Win	9–3	Thales Adriel	TKO (punches)	UWC Mexico 58	June 7, 2026	1	4:05	Tijuana, Mexico	Won the vacant UWC Middleweight Championship.
Loss	8–3	Thales Adriel	Submission (heel hook)	Supreme Fight Night 9	July 18, 2025	1	1:26	Guadalajara, Mexico	Return to Middleweight.
Win	8–2	Ricardo Chávez Villaseñor	Decision (unanimous)	UWC Mexico 56	April 6, 2025	3	5:00	Tijuana, Mexico	Catchweight (203 lb) bout.
Loss	7–2	Shamidkhan Magomedov	KO (punches)	LFA 194	October 18, 2024	1	1:17	Niagara Falls, New York, United States	For the interim LFA Welterweight Championship.
Win	7–1	Sarek Shields	KO (flying knee)	LFA 173	December 15, 2023	2	2:51	Las Vegas, Nevada, United States	
Loss	6–1	Chris Brown	KO (body kick)	LFA 148	December 9, 2022	1	3:02	Commerce, California, United States	For the vacant LFA Welterweight Championship.
Win	6–0	Daniel Reis	TKO (elbows)	LFA 135	July 8, 2022	2	1:10	Phoenix, Arizona, United States	Welterweight debut.
Win	5–0	Alberto Galera	TKO (punches)	UWC Mexico 30	November 26, 2021	2	4:19	Tijuana, Mexico	Catchweight (175 lb) bout.
Win	4–0	Hiram Furukawa	TKO (punches)	UWC Mexico 29	October 1, 2021	2	1:54	Tijuana, Mexico	Catchweight (180 lb) bout.
Win	3–0	Fernando Oliva	TKO (punches)	UWC Mexico 25	February 26, 2021	2	4:20	Tijuana, Mexico	Catchweight (180 lb) bout.
Win	2–0	Luis Guzman	KO (punches)	UWC Mexico 24	November 13, 2020	1	1:48	Tijuana, Mexico	Catchweight (198 lb) bout.
Win	1–0	Yasser Guzman	TKO (punches)	UWC Mexico 23	September 4, 2020	1	0:35	Tijuana, Mexico	Middleweight debut.
