= Amer Hrustanović =

Austrian Greco-Roman wrestler

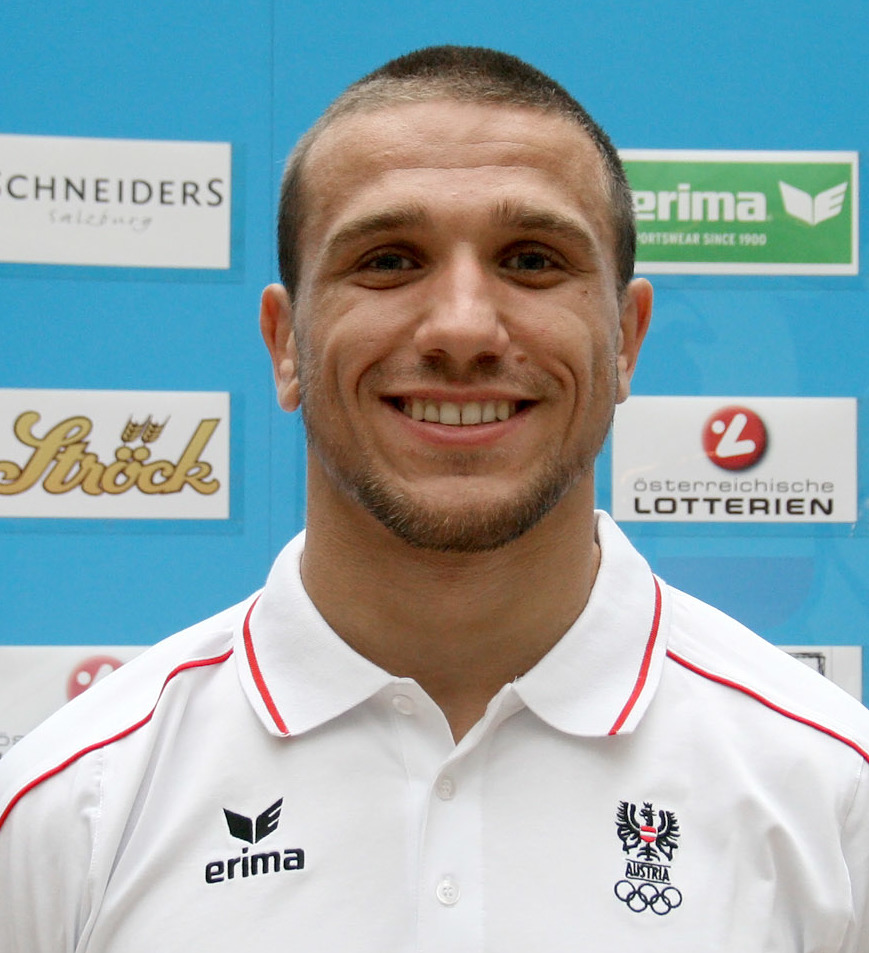

Personal information
- Full name: Amer Hrustanović
- Nationality: Austria
- Born: 11 June 1988 (age 38) Zvornik, SR Bosnia and Herzegovina, SFR Yugoslavia
- Height: 1.80 m (5 ft 11 in)
- Weight: 84 kg (185 lb)

Sport
- Style: Greco-Roman
- Club: AC Wals Salzburg
- Coach: Marco Haring Hannes
Medal record
Men's Greco-Roman wrestling
Representing Austria
European Championships
Bronze medal – third place	2014 Vantaa	85 kg

Amer Hrustanović (born 11 June 1988) is an amateur Austrian Greco-Roman wrestler, who competes in the men's light heavyweight category. He holds both Austrian and Bosnian citizenship in order to compete internationally in wrestling, including the Olympic Games. Hrustanovic is also a member of the wrestling team for AC Wals in Salzburg, and is coached and trained by Marco Haring Hannes.

Representing his adopted nation Austria, Hrustanović qualified for the men's 84 kg class at the 2012 Summer Olympics in London, by placing second in his division from the Olympic Qualification Tournament in Sofia, Bulgaria. He defeated South Korea's Lee Se-Yeol in the qualification rounds, before losing out his next match to Poland's Damian Janikowski, who was able to score a total of five points in two straight periods, leaving Hrustanovic without a single point.

He won the bronze medal at the 2014 European Championships. He lost in the last 16 to eventual champion Zhan Beleniuk. Because Beleniuk reached the final, Hrustanovic participated in the repechage, beating Laimutis Adomaitis and then Aleksey Mishin in his bronze medal match.

At the 2016 Olympics, he again competed in the light heavyweight category, beating Rami Hietaniemi in the last 16, before losing to Javid Hamzatau in the quarterfinals.
