= Nikolay Bayryakov =

Bulgarian Greco-Roman wrestler

Personal information
- Nationality: Bulgarian
- Born: September 5, 1989 (age 36) Bulgaria
- Weight: 85 kg (187 lb; 13.4 st)

Sport
- Sport: Wrestling
- Event: Greco-Roman
- Coached by: Armen Nazaryan
Medal record
Representing Bulgaria
European Championships
Bronze medal – third place	2017 Novi Sad	85 kg

Nikolay Bayryakov (Bulgarian: Николай Байряков) (born September 5, 1989) is a Bulgarian Greco-Roman wrestler. He competed in the men's Greco-Roman 85 kg event at the 2016 Summer Olympics, in which he lost the bronze medal match to Javid Hamzatau.
