= Davit Chakvetadze =

Russian Greco-Roman wrestler

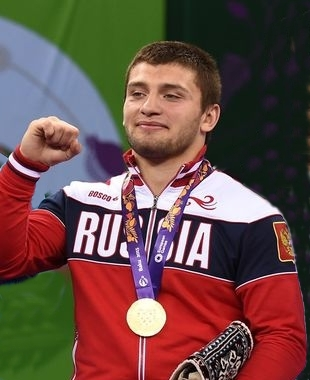
- Chakvetadze at the 2015 European Games.

Personal information
- Full name: Davit Gochaevich Chakvetadze
- Nationality: Georgian → Russian
- Born: 18 October 1992 (age 33) Kutaisi, Georgia
- Home town: Moscow, Russia
- Height: 1.75 m (5 ft 9 in)
- Weight: 85 kg (187 lb)

Sport
- Country: Russia
- Sport: Wrestling
- Event: Greco-Roman
- Club: MGFSO Moscow
- Coached by: Eduard Zadikhanov; Levan Kezevadze; Gogi Koguashvili
Medal record
Men's Greco-Roman wrestling
Representing Russia
Olympic Games
Gold medal – first place	2016 Rio de Janeiro	85 kg
Individual World Cup
Silver medal – second place	2020 Belgrade	87 kg
World Cup
Gold medal – first place	2017 Abadan	85 kg
Silver medal – second place	2015 Tehran	85 kg
European Games
Gold medal – first place	2015 Baku	85 kg

Davit Gochaevich Chakvetadze (Russian: Давит Гочаевич Чакветадзе, Georgian: დავით ჩაკვეტაძე; born 18 October 1992) is a Georgian-born Russian Greco-Roman wrestler. He's the gold medalist of the 2016 Summer Olympics in the 85 kg category.

== Career ==
In 2013, he moved to Russia by the recommendation of Russian national Greco-Roman coach Gogi Koguashvili. At the 2015 Russian National Greco-Roman Wrestling Championships, in a match against Olympic Champion Aleksey Mishin, Davit won the gold medal. He is silver medalist at the 2015 FILA Wrestling World Cup - Men's Greco-Roman and gold medalist at the 2015 European Games in the 85 kg category. Davit won the European Nations' Cup (Moscow Lights) in 2015. Chakvetadze won 9–2 over World Champion Zhan Beleniuk at the Grand Prix Baku. He competed at the 2016 Summer Olympics, where in the final he again beat Ukrainian Zhan Beleniuk.

In 2020, he won the silver medal in the 87 kg event at the 2020 Individual Wrestling World Cup held in Belgrade, Serbia.
