= Roberti Kobliashvili =

Georgian Greco-Roman wrestler

Personal information
- Nationality: Georgian
- Born: 6 December 1993 (age 32)
- Height: 180 cm (5 ft 11 in)
- Weight: 85 kg (187 lb)
- Website: Official Instagram Profile

Sport
- Country: Georgia
- Sport: Wrestling
- Event: Greco-Roman
- Turned pro: 2004
- Coached by: Imeda Precuashvili (since 2004)
Medal record
Men's Greco-Roman wrestling
Representing Georgia
World Championships
Bronze medal – third place	2017 Paris	85 kg
Bronze medal – third place	2018 Budapest	87 kg
European Championships
Gold medal – first place	2018 Kaspiysk	87 kg
Silver medal – second place	2016 Riga	85 kg
Bronze medal – third place	2022 Budapest	87 kg

Roberti Kobliashvili (born 6 December 1993) is a Georgian Greco-Roman wrestler. He won a bronze medal at the 2017 World Wrestling Championships. He is a European Champion (2018). He competed in the men's Greco-Roman 85 kg event at the 2016 Summer Olympics, in which he was eliminated in the round of 16 by Denis Kudla.

He won one of the bronze medals in the 87 kg event at the 2022 European Wrestling Championships held in Budapest, Hungary. He competed in the 87 kg event at the 2022 World Wrestling Championships held in Belgrade, Serbia.

He competed at the 2024 European Wrestling Olympic Qualification Tournament in Baku, Azerbaijan and he earned a quota place for Georgia for the 2024 Summer Olympics in Paris, France. He competed in the 97 kg event at the Olympics.
