= Saman Tahmasebi =

Azerbaijani wrestler

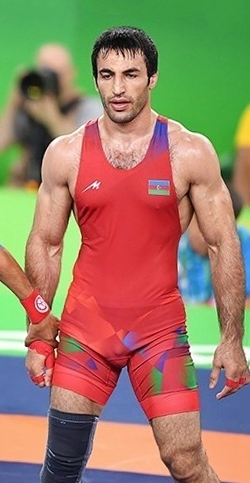
- Tahmasebi at the 2016 Olympics

Personal information
- Born: 26 July 1985 (age 40) Sanandaj, Kurdistan province, Iran
- Height: 180 cm (5 ft 11 in)
- Weight: 85 kg (187 lb)

Sport
- Sport: Greco-Roman wrestling
- Club: Azad University, Tehran; Atasport Baku
- Coached by: Jamshid Kheyrabadi
Medal record
Representing Iran
World Championships
Bronze medal – third place	2006 Guangzhou	84 kg
Bronze medal – third place	2007 Baku	84 kg
Asian Championships
Gold medal – first place	2007 Bishkek	84 kg
Representing Azerbaijan
World Championships
Silver medal – second place	2013 Budapest	84 kg
Silver medal – second place	2014 Tashkent	85 kg
Bronze medal – third place	2015 Las Vegas	85 kg

Saman Tahmasebi (Persian: سامان طهماسبی, born 26 July 1985) is an Iranian-born naturalized Azerbaijani wrestler who formerly represented (from 1995 to 2010) Iran, the country of his birth. Between 2006 and 2015, he won five medals at the world championships. He also took part in the 2008, 2012 and 2016 Olympics.
