= Rustam Assakalov =

Uzbekistani Greco-Roman wrestler

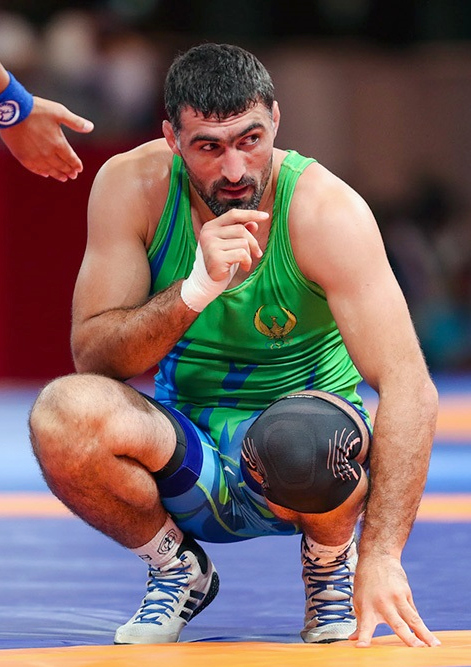
- Assakalov at the 2018 Asian games

Personal information
- Native name: Рустам Ассакалов
- Full name: Rustam Skhatbievich Assakalov
- Nationality: (Russia) Russian (Uzbekistan) Uzbek
- Born: 13 July 1984 (age 42) Novorossiysk, Russian SFSR, Soviet Union
- Education: Kuban State University
- Height: 1.88 m (6 ft 2 in)

Sport
- Country: Russia; Uzbekistan (since 2012)
- Sport: Greco-Roman wrestling
- Club: Dynamo Taskent
- Coached by: Vladimir Kholodaev; Kamil Fatkulin; Ravshan Ruzikulov (national); Salim Abduvaliev (personal)
Medal record
Representing Uzbekistan
World Championships
Silver medal – second place	2015 Las Vegas	85 kg
Bronze medal – third place	2019 Nur-Sultan	87 kg
Asian Games
Gold medal – first place	2014 Incheon	85 kg
Silver medal – second place	2018 Jakarta	87 kg
Bronze medal – third place	2022 Hungzhou	97 kg
Asian Championships
Gold medal – first place	2013 New Delhi	84 kg
Gold medal – first place	2015 Doha	85 kg
Gold medal – first place	2018 Bishkek	97 kg
Silver medal – second place	2014 Almaty	85 kg
Silver medal – second place	2022 Ulaanbaatar	97 kg
Bronze medal – third place	2017 New Delhi	98 kg
Bronze medal – third place	2021 Almaty	87 kg
Islamic Solidarity Games
Bronze medal – third place	2017 Baku	98 kg
Gold medal – first place	2021 Konya	97 kg
Vehbi Emre & Hamit Kaplan Tournament
Gold medal – first place	2022 Istanbul	97 kg
Bolat Turlykhanov Cup
Bronze medal – third place	2022 Almaty	97 kg

Rustam Skhatbievich Assakalov (Russian: Рустам Схатбиевич Ассакалов; born 13 July 1984) is a Russian-born Uzbekistani Greco-Roman wrestler of Adyg heritage. He won gold medals at the 2014 Asian Games and 2013 and 2015 Asian Championships, and silver medals at the 2018 Asian Games, 2015 World Championships and 2014 and 2018 Asian championships.

Assakalov took up wrestling in 1994 in Novorossiysk, Russia, following his father, a former wrestler. He placed third at the 2009 Russian Championships. His younger brother Bislan Assakalov is a World Cadet Champion.

In 2022, he won the gold medal in his event at the Vehbi Emre & Hamit Kaplan Tournament held in Istanbul, Turkey. He competed in the 97 kg event at the 2022 World Wrestling Championships held in Belgrade, Serbia.

Assakalov won one of the bronze medals in the 97 kg event at the 2022 Asian Games held in Hangzhou, China.

He competed at the 2024 Asian Wrestling Olympic Qualification Tournament in Bishkek, Kyrgyzstan and he earned a quota place for Uzbekistan for the 2024 Summer Olympics in Paris, France, finishing in fifth place. He lost his bronze medal match in the 97 kg event at the Olympics.
