= Metehan Başar =

Turkish sport wrestler (born 1991)

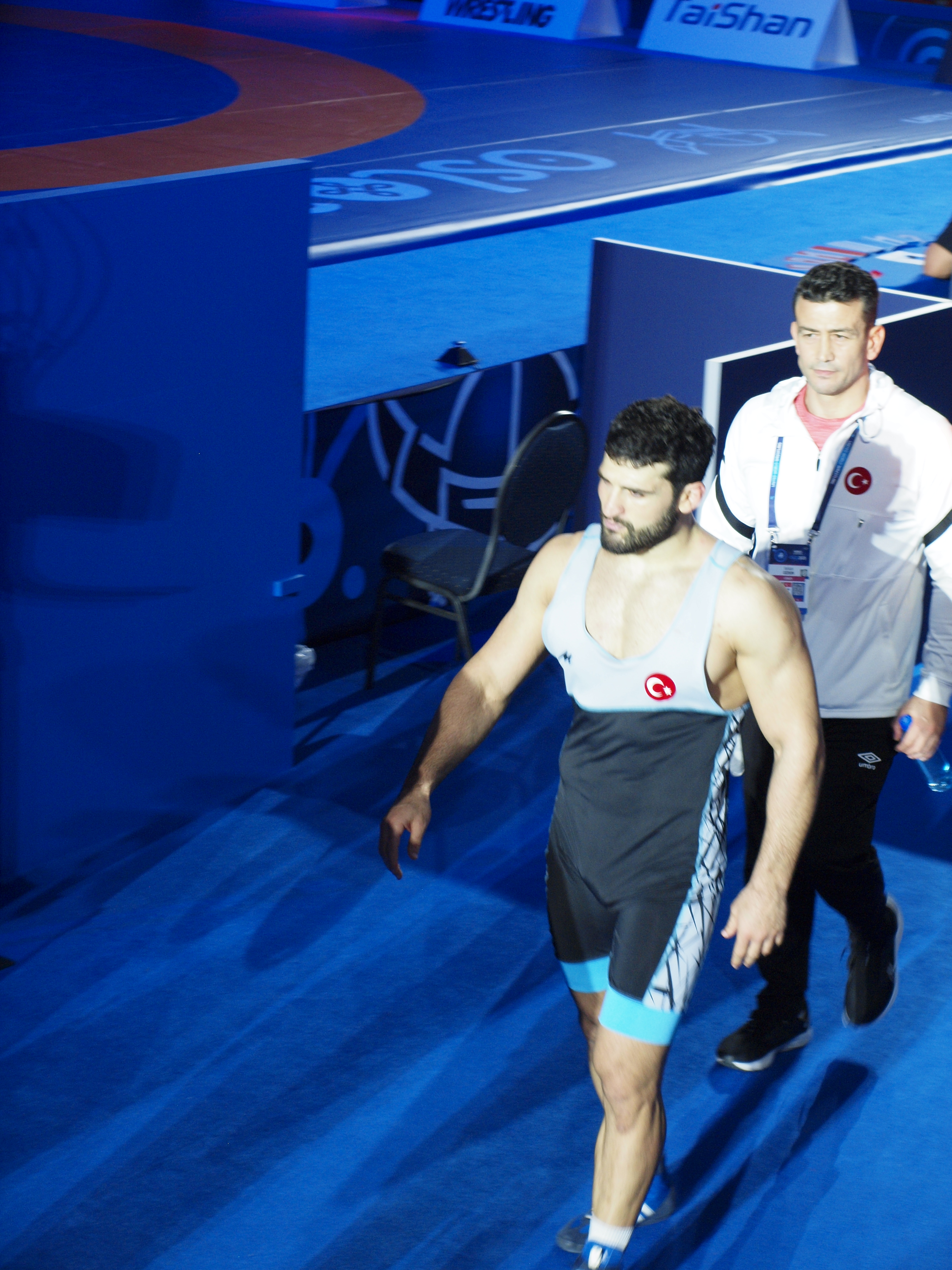

Personal information
- Nationality: Turkish
- Born: February 19, 1991 (age 35) Sakarya, Turkey
- Height: 179 cm (5 ft 10 in)
- Weight: 87 kg (192 lb)

Sport
- Country: Turkey
- Sport: Wrestling
- Event: Greco-Roman
- Team: Istanbul BB SK
- Turned pro: 2004
- Coached by: Yusuf Düzer (since 2006)
Medal record
Men's Greco-Roman wrestling
Representing Turkey
World Championships
| Gold medal – first place | 2017 Paris | 85 kg |
| Gold medal – first place | 2018 Budapest | 87 kg |
European Championships
| Silver medal – second place | 2017 Novi Sad | 85 kg |
European Games
| Bronze medal – third place | 2015 Baku | 85 kg |
Mediterranean Games
| Gold medal – first place | 2018 Tarragona | 87 kg |
Vehbi Emre & Hamit Kaplan Tournament
| Gold medal – first place | 2017 Istanbul | 86 kg |
| Gold medal – first place | 2015 Istanbul | 86 kg |
| Gold medal – first place | 2023 Istanbul | 97 kg |
| Bronze medal – third place | 2022 Istanbul | 87 kg |
| Bronze medal – third place | 2014 Istanbul | 86 kg |
Bolat Turlykhanov Cup
| Gold medal – first place | 2022 Almaty | 97 kg |
World University Championship
| Gold medal – first place | 2014 Pecs | 85 kg |
World Juniors Championships
| Bronze medal – third place | 2011 Bucharest | 96 kg |
European Juniors Championships
| Bronze medal – third place | 2011 Zrenjanin | 96 kg |

Metehan Başar (born February 19, 1991) is a twice world-champion Turkish wrestler competing in the 85 kg division of Greco-Roman wrestling. He is a member of the İstanbul Büyükşehir Belediyesi S.K.

He won the silver medal in the 85 kg event at the 2007 Black Sea Games held in Trabzon, Turkey. Başar became bronze medalist at the 2015 European Games in Baku, Azerbaijan. He won the silver medal at the 2017 European Wrestling Championships in Novi Sad, Serbia. He won the gold medal at the 2017 World Wrestling Championships in Paris, France.

In March 2021, he competed at the European Qualification Tournament in Budapest, Hungary, hoping to qualify for the 2020 Summer Olympics in Tokyo, Japan.

In 2022, he won one of the bronze medals in his event at the Vehbi Emre & Hamit Kaplan Tournament held in Istanbul, Turkey. He lost his bronze medal match in the 97 kg event at the 2022 World Wrestling Championships held in Belgrade, Serbia.
