= Viktor Lőrincz =

Hungarian Greco-Roman wrestler

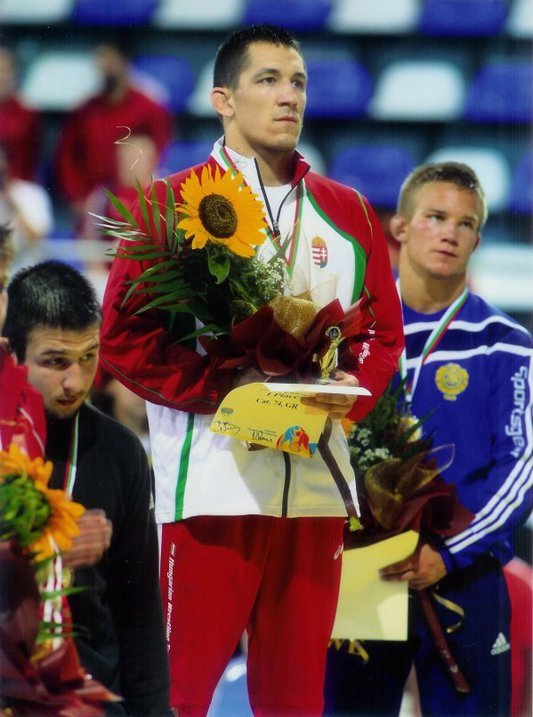
- Lőrincz in 2015

Personal information
- Nationality: Hungarian
- Born: 28 April 1990 (age 36) Cegléd, Hungary

Sport
- Sport: Sport wrestling
- Event: Greco-Roman wrestling
- Club: Ceglédi VSE ( –2017); Bp. Honvéd (2018– )
- Coached by: Ferenc Pap, András Sike, István Majoros (2018– )
Medal record
Men's Greco-Roman wrestling
Representing Hungary
Olympic Games
| Silver medal – second place | 2020 Tokyo | 87 kg |
World Championships
| Silver medal – second place | 2019 Nur-Sultan | 87 kg |
| Bronze medal – third place | 2013 Budapest | 84 kg |
| Bronze medal – third place | 2014 Tashkent | 85 kg |
European Championships
| Gold medal – first place | 2017 Novi Sad | 85 kg |
| Silver medal – second place | 2020 Rome | 87 kg |
| Bronze medal – third place | 2012 Belgrade | 84 kg |
European Games
| Bronze medal – third place | 2019 Minsk | 87 kg |

Viktor Lőrincz (born 28 April 1990) is a Hungarian Greco-Roman wrestler. He won the bronze medal in the 84 kg division at the 2013 World Wrestling Championships.
