= Maksim Manukyan =

Armenian Greco-Roman wrestler

Medal record
Men's Greco-Roman wrestling
Representing Armenia
World Championships
Gold medal – first place	2017 Paris	80 kg
Bronze medal – third place	2018 Budapest	82 kg
European Championships
Gold medal – first place	2018 Kaspiysk	82 kg
Clubs World Championships
Gold medal – first place	2016 Budapest	80 kg
Universiade
Silver medal – second place	2013 Kazan	85 kg

Maksim Manukyan (born 10 December 1987) is an Armenian Greco-Roman wrestler. He competed in the men's Greco-Roman 85 kg event at the 2016 Summer Olympics.

Maksim Manukyan became world Greco-Roman wrestling champion (80 kg) after beating Belarusian Radik Koulin 5–0 at the World Wrestling Championship in Paris on 22 August 2017.

Manukyan European champion 2018 Russia, Kaspisk

== Mixed martial arts record ==
Professional record breakdown
3 matches	3 wins	0 losses
By knockout	1	0
By submission	1	0
By decision	1	0

Res.	Record	Opponent	Method	Event	Date	Round	Time	Location	Notes
Win	2–0	Jeremy Fattorusso	Submission (guillotine choke)	Gladiator Challenge: Underground 2	2 October 2021	2	0:34	Valley Center, California, United States	
Win	1–0	Joseph Keith	TKO (punches)	LXF 5	7 August 2021	1	1:46	Commerce, California, United States	Welterweight debut.
