= Rami Hietaniemi =

Finnish wrestler (born 1982)

Medal record

Men's Greco-Roman wrestling

Representing Finland

World Championships
Bronze medal – third place	2011 Istanbul	84 kg

European Championships
Silver medal – second place	2014 Vantaa	85 kg

Rami Antero Hietaniemi (born 28 December 1982 in Perho) is a Finnish former Greco-Roman wrestler who has competed in the men's -84 kg division.
