= Javid Hamzatau =

Belarusian Greco-Roman wrestler (born 1989)

Javid Hamzatau Джавид Шакирович Гамзатов
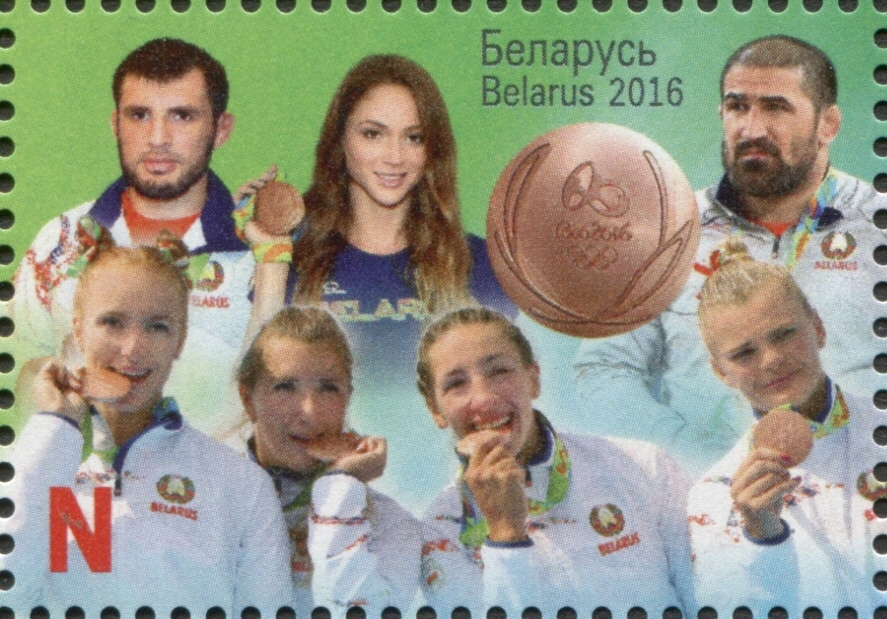
- Hamzatau (top left) on a 2016 stamp of Belarus

Personal information
- Nationality: Russian, Belarusian
- Born: 27 December 1989 (age 36) Kizilyurt, Dagestan, Russia
- Education: Gomel Sporting College
- Height: 176 cm (5 ft 9 in)

Sport
- Sport: Wrestling
- Event: Greco-Roman
- Team: SC Bazarganova
- Coached by: Ihar Piatrenka; Malik Eskanderov (2006–)
Medal record
Representing Belarus
Olympic Games
Bronze medal – third place	2016 Rio de Janeiro	85 kg
World Championships
Bronze medal – third place	2013 Budapest	84 kg
Summer Universiade
Bronze medal – third place	2013 Kazan	84 kg
Hungarian Grand Prix
Silver medal – second place	2017	98 kg
Silver medal – second place	2016	85 kg

Javid Shakirovich Hamzatau (born 27 December 1989) is a Russian-born Belarusian wrestler who competes in the Greco-Roman 84–85 kg division. He won bronze medals at the 2013 World Championships, 2013 Universiade, and 2016 Olympics.
