= 2026 European Wrestling Championships – Men's Greco-Roman 87 kg =

Men's Greco-Roman 87 kg at the 2026 European Wrestling Championships
- Venue: Tirana Olympic Park
- Location: Tirana, Albania
- Dates: 20–21 April
- Competitors: 18 from 16 nations

Medalists
gold medal	Turpal Bisultanov	Denmark
silver medal	Semen Novikov	Bulgaria
bronze medal	Yaroslav Filchakov	Ukraine
bronze medal	Islam Abbasov	Azerbaijan

The men's Greco-Roman 87 kilograms competition at the 2026 European Wrestling Championships was held from 20 to 21 April 2026 at the Tirana Olympic Park in Tirana, Albania.

== Results ==
Legend

- F — Won by fall

=== Final ===
Final
Turpal Bisultanov (DEN)	8^{F}
Semen Novikov (BUL)	4

=== Top half ===
Round of 32
Turpal Bisultanov (DEN)	9
Matej Mandić (CRO)	0

Round of 16
Aleksandr Komarov (SRB)	2
Ihar Yarashevich (UWW)	5
Turpal Bisultanov (DEN)	9
Gevorg Tadevosyan (ARM)	0
Lasha Gobadze (GEO)	10
Damian von Euw (SUI)	0
Alan Ostaev (UWW)	1
Yaroslav Filchakov (UKR)	1

Quarterfinals
Ihar Yarashevich (UWW)	0
Turpal Bisultanov (DEN)	8
Lasha Gobadze (GEO)	1
Yaroslav Filchakov (UKR)	3

Semifinals
Turpal Bisultanov (DEN)	3^{F}
Yaroslav Filchakov (UKR)	1

=== Bottom half ===
Round of 32
Waltteri Latvala (FIN)	2
Semen Novikov (BUL)	7

Round of 16
Islam Abbasov (AZE)	3
Arkadiusz Kułynycz (POL)	1
Gabriel Lupașco (MDA)	1
Exauce Mukubu (NOR)	4
Marjan Kola (ALB)	0
Semen Novikov (BUL)	9
Doğan Kaya (TUR)	6
István Takács (HUN)	1

Quarterfinals
Islam Abbasov (AZE)	4
Exauce Mukubu (NOR)	3
Semen Novikov (BUL)	8
Doğan Kaya (TUR)	0

Semifinals
Islam Abbasov (AZE)	0
Semen Novikov (BUL)	4

=== Repechage ===
Repechage round 1
Matej Mandić (CRO)	1
Gevorg Tadevosyan (ARM)	9
Waltteri Latvala (FIN)	4^{F}
Marjan Kola (ALB)	0

Repechage round 2
Gevorg Tadevosyan (ARM)	0
Ihar Yarashevich (UWW)	4^{F}
Waltteri Latvala (FIN)	2
Doğan Kaya (TUR)	11

Bronze medal matches
Ihar Yarashevich (UWW)	1
Yaroslav Filchakov (UKR)	1
Doğan Kaya (TUR)	1
Islam Abbasov (AZE)	5

== Final standing ==
Rank	Wrestler
1st place, gold medalist(s)	Turpal Bisultanov (DEN)
2nd place, silver medalist(s)	Semen Novikov (BUL)
3rd place, bronze medalist(s)	Yaroslav Filchakov (UKR)
3rd place, bronze medalist(s)	Ihar Yarashevich (UWW)
5	Islam Abbasov (AZE)
5	Doğan Kaya (TUR)
7	Waltteri Latvala (FIN)
8	Lasha Gobadze (GEO)
9	Gevorg Tadevosyan (ARM)
10	Exauce Mukubu (NOR)
11	Aleksandr Komarov (SRB)
12	Alan Ostaev (UWW)
13	Arkadiusz Kułynycz (POL)
14	Gabriel Lupașco (MDA)
15	István Takács (HUN)
16	Matej Mandić (CRO)
17	Damian von Euw (SUI)
18	Marjan Kola (ALB)
