= 2026 World Wrestling Championships – Men's Greco-Roman 87 kg =

Wrestling competitions

Men's Greco-Roman 87 kg at the 2026 World Championships
- Venue: Barys Arena
- Dates: 26–27 October 2026
- Competitors: 32 from 32 nations

Medalists
gold medal	Semen Novikov	Bulgaria
silver medal	Alireza Mohmadi	Iran
bronze medal	Lasha Gobadze	Georgia
bronze medal	Gevorg Tadevosyan	Armenia

The men's Greco-Roman 87 kilograms is a competition featured at the 2026 World Wrestling Championships, and was held in Astana, Kazakhstan on 26 and 27 October 2026.

This Greco-Roman wrestling competition consists of a single-elimination tournament, with a repechage used to determine the winner of two bronze medals. The two finalists face off for gold and silver medals. Each wrestler who loses to one of the two finalists moves into the repechage, culminating in a pair of bronze medal matches, featuring the semifinal losers each facing the remaining repechage opponent from their half of the bracket.

== Results ==
Legend

- F — Won by fall
- WO — Won by walkover

=== Final ===
Final
Semen Novikov (BUL)	4
Alireza Mohmadi (IRI)	0

=== Top half ===
Round of 32
Aleksandr Komarov (SRB)	5
Shi Likui (CHN)	6
Ihar Yarashevich (BLR)	1
Mukhammadkodir Rasulov (UZB)	6
Mohamed El-Kasem (EGY)	9
Daniel Grégorich (CUB)	5
Erion Ramljak (AUS)	0
Tamás Lévai (HUN)	8
Ivan Huklek (CRO)	6^{F}
Beka Melelashvili (USA)	3
Azat Salidinov (KGZ)	0
Lasha Gobadze (GEO)	2
Latana Iuta Sopa (ASA)	0
Semen Novikov (BUL)	7^{F}
Ali Cengiz (TUR)	0
Islam Abbasov (AZE)	6

Round of 16
Shi Likui (CHN)	0
Mukhammadkodir Rasulov (UZB)	9
Mohamed El-Kasem (EGY)	0
Tamás Lévai (HUN)	7
Ivan Huklek (CRO)	0
Lasha Gobadze (GEO)	6
Semen Novikov (BUL)	6
Islam Abbasov (AZE)	5

Quarterfinals
Mukhammadkodir Rasulov (UZB)	1
Tamás Lévai (HUN)	1
Lasha Gobadze (GEO)	0
Semen Novikov (BUL)	3

Semifinals
Mukhammadkodir Rasulov (UZB)	0
Semen Novikov (BUL)	2

=== Bottom half ===
Round of 32
Alireza Mohmadi (IRI)	11
Tsogtbaataryn Batbayar (MGL)	0
Arkadiusz Kułynycz (POL)	3
Bachir Sid Azara (ALG)	1
Luis Avendaño (VEN)	7
Lee Seung-hwan (KOR)	7^{F}
Vladimeri Karchaidze (FRA)	1
Yaroslav Filchakov (UKR)	3
Sunil Kumar (IND)	0
Exauce Mukubu (NOR)	9
Aleksandar Stjepanetic (SWE)	3
So Sakabe (JPN)	1
Jafar Khan (QAT)
Nursultan Tursynov (KAZ)	WO
Gevorg Tadevosyan (ARM)	6
Milad Alirzaev (RUS)	3

Round of 16
Alireza Mohmadi (IRI)	5
Arkadiusz Kułynycz (POL)	0
Lee Seung-hwan (KOR)	1
Yaroslav Filchakov (UKR)	5
Exauce Mukubu (NOR)	8
Aleksandar Stjepanetic (SWE)	3
Nursultan Tursynov (KAZ)	1
Gevorg Tadevosyan (ARM)	4

Quarterfinals
Alireza Mohmadi (IRI)	8
Yaroslav Filchakov (UKR)	5
Exauce Mukubu (NOR)	4
Gevorg Tadevosyan (ARM)	10

Semifinals
Alireza Mohmadi (IRI)	10
Gevorg Tadevosyan (ARM)	1

=== Repechage ===
Repechage round 1
Latana Iuta Sopa (ASA)	0
Islam Abbasov (AZE)	8
Tsogtbaataryn Batbayar (MGL)	0
Arkadiusz Kułynycz (POL)	10^{F}

Repechage round 2
Islam Abbasov (AZE)	3
Lasha Gobadze (GEO)	5
Arkadiusz Kułynycz (POL)	1
Yaroslav Filchakov (UKR)	2

Bronze medals
Lasha Gobadze (GEO)	5
Mukhammadkodir Rasulov (UZB)	1
Yaroslav Filchakov (UKR)	1
Gevorg Tadevosyan (ARM)	4

== Final standing ==
Rank	Athlete
1st place, gold medalist(s)	Semen Novikov (BUL)
2nd place, silver medalist(s)	Alireza Mohmadi (IRI)
3rd place, bronze medalist(s)	Lasha Gobadze (GEO)
3rd place, bronze medalist(s)	Gevorg Tadevosyan (ARM)
5	Mukhammadkodir Rasulov (UZB)
5	Yaroslav Filchakov (UKR)
7	Arkadiusz Kułynycz (POL)
8	Islam Abbasov (AZE)
9	Exauce Mukubu (NOR)
10	Tamás Lévai (HUN)
11	Lee Seung-hwan (KOR)
12	Nursultan Tursynov (KAZ)
13	Ivan Huklek (CRO)
14	Aleksandar Stjepanetic (SWE)
15	Mohamed El-Kasem (EGY)
16	Shi Likui (CHN)
17	Aleksandr Komarov (SRB)
18	Daniel Grégorich (CUB)
19	Milad Alirzaev (RUS)
20	Bachir Sid Azara (ALG)
21	Vladimeri Karchaidze (FRA)
22	So Sakabe (JPN)
23	Ihar Yarashevich (BLR)
24	Luis Avendaño (VEN)
25	Beka Melelashvili (USA)
26	Jafar Khan (QAT)
27	Azat Salidinov (KGZ)
28	Ali Cengiz (TUR)
29	Erion Ramljak (AUS)
30	Sunil Kumar (IND)
31	Latana Iuta Sopa (ASA)
32	Tsogtbaataryn Batbayar (MGL)
