= 2024 European Wrestling Championships – Men's Greco-Roman 87 kg =

Wrestling competition

Men's Greco-Roman 87 kg at the 2024 European Wrestling Championships
- Venue: Polyvalent Hall
- Location: Bucharest, Romania
- Dates: 12-13 February
- Competitors: 22

Medalists
| gold medal | Aleksandr Komarov | Serbia |
| silver medal | Ali Cengiz | Turkey |
| bronze medal | Kiryl Maskevich | Individual Neutral Athletes |
| bronze medal | Zhan Beleniuk | Ukraine |

The Men's Greco-Roman 87 kg is a competition featured at the 2024 European Wrestling Championships, and was held in Bucharest, Romania on February 12 and 13.

== Results ==
Legend

- C — Won by 3 cautions given to the opponent
- F — Won by fall
- WO — Won by walkover

=== Final ===
| Final |
| Ali Cengiz (TUR) | 1 |
| Aleksandr Komarov (SRB) | 4 |

=== Top half ===
Round of 32
Ivan Huklek (CRO) | 12
Lukas Staudacher (AUT) | 3
Pascal Eisele (GER) | 3
Marcel Sterkenburg (NED) | 5
Exauce Mukubu (NOR)
Gevorg Tadevosyan (ARM) | WO

Round of 16
Ali Cengiz (TUR) | 6
Yoan Dimitrov (BUL) | 3
Ivan Huklek (CRO) | 0
Alex Kessidis (SWE) | 8
Tourpal Ali Magamadov (FRA) | 1
Marcel Sterkenburg (NED) | 5
Gevorg Tadevosyan (ARM) | 1
Kiryl Maskevich (AIN) | 3

Quarterfinals
Ali Cengiz (TUR) | 7^{C}
Alex Kessidis (SWE) | 1
Marcel Sterkenburg (NED) | 1
Kiryl Maskevich (AIN) | 5

Semifinals
Ali Cengiz (TUR) | 4
Kiryl Maskevich (AIN) | 1

=== Bottom half ===
Round of 32
Ramon Betschart (SUI) | 3
Szymon Szymonowicz (POL) | 6
Raido Liitmäe (EST) | 0
Alan Ostaev (AIN) | 12^{F}
Martynas Nemsevičius (LTU) | 0
Aleksandr Komarov (SRB) | 7

Round of 16
Islam Abbasov (AZE) | 2
Szymon Szymonowicz (POL) | 1
Alan Ostaev (AIN) | 3
Achiko Bolkvadze (GEO) | 8
István Takács (HUN) | 1
Aleksandr Komarov (SRB) | 1
Nicu Ojog (ROU) | 1
Zhan Beleniuk (UKR) | 3

Quarterfinals
Islam Abbasov (AZE) | 6
Achiko Bolkvadze (GEO) | 3
Aleksandr Komarov (SRB) | 3
Zhan Beleniuk (UKR) | 1

Semifinals
Islam Abbasov (AZE) | 1
Aleksandr Komarov (SRB) | 3

=== Repechage ===
Repechage round 1
Martynas Nemsevičius (LTU) | 1
István Takács (HUN) | 3

Repechage round 2
Yoan Dimitrov (BUL) | 1
Alex Kessidis (SWE) | 4
István Takács (HUN) | 1
Zhan Beleniuk (UKR) | 1

Bronze medal match
Alex Kessidis (SWE) | 1
Kiryl Maskevich (AIN) | 12
Zhan Beleniuk (UKR) | 2
Islam Abbasov (AZE) | 1

== Final standing ==
| Rank | Athlete |
|---|---|
| 1st place, gold medalist(s) | Aleksandr Komarov (SRB) |
| 2nd place, silver medalist(s) | Ali Cengiz (TUR) |
| 3rd place, bronze medalist(s) | Kiryl Maskevich (AIN) |
| 3rd place, bronze medalist(s) | Zhan Beleniuk (UKR) |
| 5 | Islam Abbasov (AZE) |
| 5 | Alex Kessidis (SWE) |
| 7 | Marcel Sterkenburg (NED) |
| 8 | Alan Ostaev (AIN) |
| 9 | Gevorg Tadevosyan (ARM) |
| 10 | István Takács (HUN) |
| 11 | Ivan Huklek (CRO) |
| 12 | Achiko Bolkvadze (GEO) |
| 13 | Szymon Szymonowicz (POL) |
| 14 | Yoan Dimitrov (BUL) |
| 15 | Pascal Eisele (GER) |
| 16 | Ramon Betschart (SUI) |
| 17 | Lukas Staudacher (AUT) |
| 18 | Nicu Ojog (ROU) |
| 19 | Tourpal Ali Magamadov (FRA) |
| 20 | Martynas Nemsevičius (LTU) |
| 21 | Exauce Mukubu (NOR) |
| 22 | Raido Liitmäe (EST) |
