= 2023 European Wrestling Championships – Men's Greco-Roman 87 kg =

Wrestling competition

Men's Greco-Roman 87 kg at the 2023 European Wrestling Championships
- Venue: Arena Zagreb
- Location: Zagreb, Croatia
- Dates: 21-22 April
- Competitors: 25

Medalists
gold medal	István Takács	Hungary
silver medal	Ali Cengiz	Turkey
bronze medal	Semen Novikov	Bulgaria
bronze medal	Lasha Gobadze	Georgia

The Men's Greco-Roman 87 kg is a competition featured at the 2023 European Wrestling Championships, and will held in Zagreb, Croatia on April 21 and 22.

== Results ==
Legend

- F — Won by fall
- WO — Won by walkover

=== Final ===
Final
István Takács (HUN)	5
Ali Cengiz (TUR)	2

=== Top half ===
Round of 32
Hannes Wagner (GER)	0
Semen Novikov (BUL)	9
Nicu Ojog (ROU)	9
Viorel Burduja (MDA)	1
István Takács (HUN)	3
Žarko Dickov (SRB)	1
Arkadiusz Kułynycz (POL)	7
Vigen Nazaryan (ARM)	8
Mirco Minguzzi (ITA)	2
Andreas Välis (EST)	2

Round of 16
Turpal Bisultanov (DEN)	3
Semen Novikov (BUL)	12
Nicu Ojog (ROU)	1
István Takács (HUN)	7
Lukas Staudacher (AUT)	1
Vigen Nazaryan (ARM)	1
Andreas Välis (EST)	1
Damian von Euw (SUI)	9

Quarterfinals
Semen Novikov (BUL)	2
István Takács (HUN)	3
Vigen Nazaryan (ARM)	4
Damian von Euw (SUI)	8

Semifinals
István Takács (HUN)	5
Damian von Euw (SUI)	1

=== Bottom half ===
Round of 32
Waltteri Latvala (FIN)	2
Artem Matiash (UKR)	11
Ivan Huklek (CRO)	5^{F}
Nikolaos Varkas (GRE)	0
Islam Abbasov (AZE)	9
Tourpal Ali Magamadov (FRA)	0
Marcel Sterkenburg (NED)	10
Martynas Nemsevičius (LTU)	0

Round of 16
Alex Bjurberg Kessidis (SWE)	4^{F}
Artem Matiash (UKR)	0
Ivan Huklek (CRO)	0
Lasha Gobadze (GEO)	9
Daniel Herrero (ESP)	0
Islam Abbasov (AZE)	9
Marcel Sterkenburg (NED)
Ali Cengiz (TUR)	WO

Quarterfinals
Alex Bjurberg Kessidis (SWE)	0
Lasha Gobadze (GEO)	6
Islam Abbasov (AZE)	1
Ali Cengiz (TUR)	1

Semifinals
Lasha Gobadze (GEO)	1
Ali Cengiz (TUR)	3

Repechage round 1
Žarko Dickov (SRB)	0
Nicu Ojog (ROU)	9

Repechage round 2
Nicu Ojog (ROU)	0
Semen Novikov (BUL)	8
Marcel Sterkenburg (NED)
Islam Abbasov (AZE)	WO

Bronze medal match
Semen Novikov (BUL)	5
Damian von Euw (SUI)	2
Islam Abbasov (AZE)	0
Lasha Gobadze (GEO)	3

== Final standing ==
Rank	Athlete
1st place, gold medalist(s)	István Takács (HUN)
2nd place, silver medalist(s)	Ali Cengiz (TUR)
3rd place, bronze medalist(s)	Semen Novikov (BUL)
3rd place, bronze medalist(s)	Lasha Gobadze (GEO)
5	Damian von Euw (SUI)
5	Islam Abbasov (AZE)
7	Nicu Ojog (ROU)
8	Vigen Nazaryan (ARM)
9	Ivan Huklek (CRO)
10	Alex Kessidis (SWE)
11	Artem Matiash (UKR)
12	Marcel Sterkenburg (NED)
13	Andreas Välis (EST)
14	Arkadiusz Kułynycz (POL)
15	Turpal Bisultanov (DEN)
16	Mirco Minguzzi (ITA)
17	Waltteri Latvala (FIN)
18	Lukas Staudacher (AUT)
19	Viorel Burduja (MDA)
20	Žarko Dickov (SRB)
21	Nikolaos Varkas (GRE)
22	Hannes Wagner (GER)
23	Daniel Herrero (ESP)
24	Tourpal Ali Magamadov (FRA)
25	Martynas Nemsevičius (LTU)
