= 2020 Individual Wrestling World Cup – Men's Greco-Roman 87 kg =

The Men's Greco-Roman 87 kg is a competition featured at the 2020 Individual Wrestling World Cup, and was held in Belgrade, Serbia on 12 and 13 December 2020.

== Medalists ==
Gold	Kiryl Maskevich; Belarus
Silver	Davit Chakvetadze; Russia
Bronze	Zurabi Datunashvili; Serbia
Bronze	Semen Novikov; Ukraine

== Results ==
Legend

- F — Won by fall

1/8 finals
Sunil Kumar (IND)	0
Fabio Parisi (ITA)	10
Ilias Pagkalidis (GRE)	0
Kiryl Maskevich (BLR)	8
István Takács (HUN)	3
Artur Shahinyan (ARM)	2
Zurabi Datunashvili (SRB)	2
Atabek Azisbekov (KGZ)	1
Islam Abbasov (AZE)	1
Bachir Sid Azara (ALG)	2
Doğan Göktaş (TUR)	5
Hossein Nouri (IRI)	10
Szymon Szymonowicz (POL)	0
Semen Novikov (UKR)	9
Yoan Dimitrov (BUL)	1
Davit Chakvetadze (RUS)	3

Quarterfinals
Fabio Parisi (ITA)	0
Kiryl Maskevich (BLR)	6^{F}
István Takács (HUN)	1
Zurabi Datunashvili (SRB)	2
Bachir Sid Azara (ALG)	2
Hossein Nouri (IRI)	5
Semen Novikov (UKR)	2
Davit Chakvetadze (RUS)	5

Semifinals
Kiryl Maskevich (BLR)	11
Zurabi Datunashvili (SRB)	3
Hossein Nouri (IRI)	0
Davit Chakvetadze (RUS)	7

Final
Kiryl Maskevich (BLR)	10
Davit Chakvetadze (RUS)	0

Repechage round 1
Ilias Pagkalidis (GRE)	3
Fabio Parisi (ITA)	6
Yoan Dimitrov (BUL)	1
Semen Novikov (UKR)	9

Bronze medals
Fabio Parisi (ITA)	1
Zurabi Datunashvili (SRB)	3
Semen Novikov (UKR)	12
Hossein Nouri (IRI)	4
