= 2025 Poland Open =

Poland wrestling tournament

2025 Ziolkowski, Pytlasinski, Poland Open
- Host city: Warsaw, Poland
- Dates: 30 July–3 August 2025
- Stadium: Arena Ursynów

Champions
- Freestyle: Ukraine
- Greco-Roman: Ukraine
- Women: Ukraine

The 2025 Poland Open is a sport wrestling event was held in Warsaw, Poland between 30 July and 3 August 2025. 29th Poland Open in Women's Wrestling, 34th Wacław Ziolkowski Memorial in Freestyle wrestling and 68th Wladyslaw Pytlasiński Memorial in Greco – Roman.

== Event videos ==
The event was aired freely on the SportZona YouTube channel.

Broadcasting
30 July 2025 M1	30 July 2025 M2	30 July 2025 M3
	30 July 2025 M2 Finals	
31 July 2025 M1	31 July 2025 M2	31 July 2025 M3
	31 July 2025 M2 Finals	
1 August 2025 M1	1 August 2025 M2	1 August 2025 M3
	1 August 2025 M2 Finals	
2 August 2025 M1	2 August 2025 M2	2 August 2025 M3
	2 August 2025 M2 Finals	
3 August 2025 M1	3 August 2025 M2	3 August 2025 M3
	3 August 2025 M2 Finals	

== Medal table ==
* Host nation (Poland)

Rank	Nation	Gold	Silver	Bronze	Total
1	Ukraine	8	10	17	35
2	United States	4	3	5	12
3	Sweden	4	2	1	7
4	Georgia	3	1	6	10
5	Kyrgyzstan	3	1	4	8
6	Germany	2	3	7	12
7	Canada	1	1	1	3
7	Hungary	1	1	1	3
9	Poland*	1	0	4	5
10	Armenia	1	0	2	3
11	Azerbaijan	1	0	0	1
11	Brazil	1	0	0	1
13	Kazakhstan	0	2	4	6
14	Lithuania	0	2	0	2
15	Italy	0	1	2	3
16	South Korea	0	1	1	2
17	Latvia	0	1	0	1
17	Slovakia	0	1	0	1
19	Switzerland	0	0	3	3
20	Algeria	0	0	1	1
20	Estonia	0	0	1	1
Totals (21 entries)		30	30	60	120

== Team ranking ==
Rank	Men's freestyle		Men's Greco-Roman		Women's freestyle	
Rank	Team	Points	Team	Points	Team	Points
1	Ukraine	617	Ukraine	375	Ukraine	530
2	Poland	307	Kyrgyzstan	317	United States	292
3	United States	280	Georgia	274	Germany	222
4	Germany	222	Sweden	237	Sweden	205
5	Georgia	185	Kazakhstan	185	Kazakhstan	175

== Medal overview ==
=== Men's freestyle (Waclaw Ziolkowski Memorial) ===
Event	Gold	Silver	Bronze
57 kg	Nikoloz Botchorishvili; Georgia	Garette Saunders; Canada	Thomas Epp; Switzerland
57 kg	Nikoloz Botchorishvili; Georgia	Garette Saunders; Canada	Vladyslav Abramov; Ukraine
61 kg	Kamil Kerymov; Ukraine	Vito Arujau; United States	Devan Turner; United States
61 kg	Kamil Kerymov; Ukraine	Vito Arujau; United States	Andrii Dzhelep; Ukraine
65 kg	Peiman Biabani; Canada	Yun Jun-sik; South Korea	Andrii Biliichuk; Ukraine
65 kg	Peiman Biabani; Canada	Yun Jun-sik; South Korea	Mykyta Honcharov; Ukraine
70 kg	Brayton Lee; United States	Oleksii Boruta; Ukraine	Vasyl Shuptar; Ukraine
70 kg	Brayton Lee; United States	Oleksii Boruta; Ukraine	Jeon Jin-su; South Korea
74 kg	Joey Blaze; United States	Mykyta Morhun; Ukraine	Kamil Rybicki; Poland
74 kg	Joey Blaze; United States	Mykyta Morhun; Ukraine	Otari Bagauri; Georgia
79 kg	Simon Ruiz; United States	Vasyl Mykhailov; Ukraine	Dean Hamiti; United States
79 kg	Simon Ruiz; United States	Vasyl Mykhailov; Ukraine	Otari Adeishvili; Georgia
86 kg	Joshua Morodion; Germany	Ivars Samušonoks; Latvia	Denys Bykov; Ukraine
86 kg	Joshua Morodion; Germany	Ivars Samušonoks; Latvia	Oleksandr Mamrosh; Ukraine
92 kg	Lars Schäfle; Germany	Ivan Chornohuz; Ukraine	Dustin Plott; United States
92 kg	Lars Schäfle; Germany	Ivan Chornohuz; Ukraine	Iuza Tsertsvadze; Georgia
97 kg	Zbigniew Baranowski; Poland	Davit Mchedlidze; Ukraine	Ertuğrul Ağca; Germany
97 kg	Zbigniew Baranowski; Poland	Davit Mchedlidze; Ukraine	Ivan Prymachenko; Ukraine
125 kg	Giorgi Meshvildishvili; Azerbaijan	Volodymyr Kochanov; Ukraine	Robert Baran; Poland
125 kg	Giorgi Meshvildishvili; Azerbaijan	Volodymyr Kochanov; Ukraine	Mohsen Siyar; Germany

=== Men's Greco-Roman (Wladyslaw Pytlasinski Cup) ===
Event	Gold	Silver	Bronze
55 kg	Akyikat Kulzhigit Uulu; Kyrgyzstan	Koriun Sahradian; Ukraine	Ulan Muratbek Uulu; Kyrgyzstan
55 kg	Akyikat Kulzhigit Uulu; Kyrgyzstan	Koriun Sahradian; Ukraine	Ramaz Silagava; Georgia
60 kg	Akyl Sulaimanov; Kyrgyzstan	Vladyslav Kuzko; Ukraine	Olivier Skrzypczak; Poland
60 kg	Akyl Sulaimanov; Kyrgyzstan	Vladyslav Kuzko; Ukraine	Abdelkarim Fergat; Algeria
63 kg	Zholaman Sharshenbekov; Kyrgyzstan	Bakytzhan Kabdyl; Kazakhstan	Saifulla Kurman; Kazakhstan
63 kg	Zholaman Sharshenbekov; Kyrgyzstan	Bakytzhan Kabdyl; Kazakhstan	Oleksandr Hrushyn; Ukraine
67 kg	Diego Chkhikvadze; Georgia	Razzak Beishekeev; Kyrgyzstan	Witalis Lazovski; Germany
67 kg	Diego Chkhikvadze; Georgia	Razzak Beishekeev; Kyrgyzstan	Giorgi Shotadze; Georgia
72 kg	Parviz Nasibov; Ukraine	Kristupas Šleiva; Lithuania	Slavik Galstyan; Armenia
72 kg	Parviz Nasibov; Ukraine	Kristupas Šleiva; Lithuania	Yryskeldi Khamzaev; Kyrgyzstan
77 kg	Malkhas Amoyan; Armenia	Albin Olofsson; Sweden	Yryskeldi Maksatbek Uulu; Kyrgyzstan
77 kg	Malkhas Amoyan; Armenia	Albin Olofsson; Sweden	Artur Politaiev; Ukraine
82 kg	Alexander Johansson; Sweden	Ruslan Abdiiev; Ukraine	Dias Kaltay; Kazakhstan
82 kg	Alexander Johansson; Sweden	Ruslan Abdiiev; Ukraine	Ramon Betschart; Switzerland
87 kg	Lasha Gobadze; Georgia	Aivengo Rikadze; Georgia	Gurami Khetsuriani; Georgia
87 kg	Lasha Gobadze; Georgia	Aivengo Rikadze; Georgia	Asan Zhanyshov; Kyrgyzstan
97 kg	Aleksandar Stjepanetic; Sweden	Mindaugas Venckaitis; Lithuania	Vladlen Kozlyuk; Ukraine
97 kg	Aleksandar Stjepanetic; Sweden	Mindaugas Venckaitis; Lithuania	Yerzat Yerlanov; Kazakhstan
130 kg	Mykola Kuchmii; Ukraine	Franz Richter; Germany	Razmik Kurdyan; Armenia
130 kg	Mykola Kuchmii; Ukraine	Franz Richter; Germany	Heiki Nabi; Estonia

=== Women's freestyle (Poland Open) ===
Event	Gold	Silver	Bronze
50 kg	Oksana Livach; Ukraine	Emanuela Liuzzi; Italy	Svenja Jungo; Switzerland
50 kg	Oksana Livach; Ukraine	Emanuela Liuzzi; Italy	Aida Kerymova; Ukraine
53 kg	Jonna Malmgren; Sweden	Annika Wendle; Germany	Snizhana Onufriieva; Ukraine
53 kg	Jonna Malmgren; Sweden	Annika Wendle; Germany	Liliia Malanchuk; Ukraine
55 kg	Oleksandra Khomenets; Ukraine	Albina Rillia; Ukraine	Amory Andrich; Germany
55 kg	Oleksandra Khomenets; Ukraine	Albina Rillia; Ukraine	Zulfiya Yakhyarova; Kazakhstan
57 kg	Solomiia Vynnyk; Ukraine	Tamara Dollák; Hungary	Evelina Hulthén; Sweden
57 kg	Solomiia Vynnyk; Ukraine	Tamara Dollák; Hungary	Mia Friesen; Canada
59 kg	Mariia Vynnyk; Ukraine	Alexis Janiak; United States	Erika Bognár; Hungary
59 kg	Mariia Vynnyk; Ukraine	Alexis Janiak; United States	Elena Brugger; Germany
62 kg	Iryna Bondar; Ukraine	Johanna Lindborg; Sweden	Aurora Campagna; Italy
62 kg	Iryna Bondar; Ukraine	Johanna Lindborg; Sweden	Alicja Nowosad; Poland
65 kg	Enikő Elekes; Hungary	Jennifer Rogers; United States	Vanja Gersak-Perez; Germany
65 kg	Enikő Elekes; Hungary	Jennifer Rogers; United States	Nina Makem; United States
68 kg	Tindra Sjöberg; Sweden	Gerda Barth; Germany	Manola Skobelska; Ukraine
68 kg	Tindra Sjöberg; Sweden	Gerda Barth; Germany	Sophia Schäfle; Germany
72 kg	Kaylynn Albrecht; United States	Zsuzsanna Molnár; Slovakia	Alexandria Alli; United States
72 kg	Kaylynn Albrecht; United States	Zsuzsanna Molnár; Slovakia	Iryna Zablotska; Ukraine
76 kg	Thamires Machado; Brazil	Elmira Syzdykova; Kazakhstan	Anastasiya Alpyeyeva; Ukraine
76 kg	Thamires Machado; Brazil	Elmira Syzdykova; Kazakhstan	Enrica Rinaldi; Italy

== Participating nations ==
1. Algeria
2. Armenia
3. Azerbaijan
4. Belgium
5. Brazil
6. Canada
7. Costa Rica
8. Czech Republic
9. Denmark
10. Estonia
11. Finland
12. Georgia
13. Germany
14. Hungary
15. Israel
16. Italy
17. Kazakhstan
18. Kyrgyzstan
19. South Korea
20. Latvia
21. Lithuania
22. Netherlands
23. Norway
24. New Zealand
25. Poland (Host)
26. Serbia
27. Switzerland
28. Slovakia
29. Sweden
30. Ukraine
31. United States

== Results ==
Legend

- Ret — Retired
- WO — Won by walkover

=== Men's freestyle (Wacław Ziółkowski Memorial) ===
==== Men's freestyle 57 kg ====
	Score	
Round 1
Vladyslav Abramov (UKR)	5–3	Salaheddine Kateb (ALG)
Peter Hammer (CRC)	2–12	Garette Saunders (CAN)
Round 2
Nikoloz Botchorishvili (GEO)	10–0	Vladyslav Abramov (UKR)
Thomas Epp (SUI)	10–0	Peter Hammer (CRC)
Round 3
Salaheddine Kateb (ALG)	1–10	Nikoloz Botchorishvili (GEO)
Garette Saunders (CAN)	7–2	Thomas Epp (SUI)
Final III–V
Vladyslav Abramov (UKR)	14–3	Peter Hammer (CRC)
Thomas Epp (SUI)	3–2	Salaheddine Kateb (ALG)
Final I–II
Nikoloz Botchorishvili (GEO)	12–1 Fall	Garette Saunders (CAN)

==== Men's freestyle 61 kg ====
	Score	
Round 1
Oussama Laribi (ALG)	0–10	Kamil Kerymov (UKR)
Dario Dittrich (GER)	1–4	Nino Leutert (SUI)
Devan Turner (USA)	3–2	Mykyta Abramov (UKR)
Vito Arujau (USA)	9–6	Andrii Dzhelep (UKR)
Round 2
Oussama Laribi (ALG)	10–0	Dario Dittrich (GER)
Mykyta Abramov (UKR)	1–3 Fall	Andrii Dzhelep (UKR)
Rafał Szewc (POL)	0–8 Fall	Kamil Kerymov (UKR)
Round 3
Oussama Laribi (ALG)	10–0	Rafał Szewc (POL)
Kamil Kerymov (UKR)	12–1	Nino Leutert (SUI)
Devan Turner (USA)	0–2	Vito Arujau (USA)
Final III–V
Nino Leutert (SUI)	0–8 Fall	Andrii Dzhelep (UKR)
Oussama Laribi (ALG)	2–5	Devan Turner (USA)
Final I–II
Kamil Kerymov (UKR)	5–4	Vito Arujau (USA)

==== Men's freestyle 65 kg ====
	Score	
Round 1
Yun Jun-sik (KOR)	6–5	Ayub Musaev (BEL)
Chouaib Sahraoui (ALG)	2–12	Zoltán Mizsei (HUN)
Nico Megerle (GER)	3–6	Andrii Biliichuk (UKR)
Krzysztof Bieńkowski (POL)	4–2	Nino Leutert (SUI)
Dmytro Mykhniuk (UKR)	0–11	Peiman Biabani (CAN)
Mykyta Honcharov (UKR)	13–0	Kaige Brown (NZL)
Round 2
Ayub Musaev (BEL)	15–5	Chouaib Sahraoui (ALG)
Nico Megerle (GER)	5–0	Nino Leutert (SUI)
Dmytro Mykhniuk (UKR)	10–3	Kaige Brown (NZL)
Daniel Kulczyński (POL)	0–8 Fall	Yun Jun-sik (KOR)
Zoltán Mizsei (HUN)	2–4	Andrii Biliichuk (UKR)
Krzysztof Bieńkowski (POL)	0–3	Peiman Biabani (CAN)
Round 3
Ayub Musaev (BEL)	2–3	Nico Megerle (GER)
Dmytro Mykhniuk (UKR)	16–6	Daniel Kulczyński (POL)
Zoltán Mizsei (HUN)	0–3	Krzysztof Bieńkowski (POL)
Mykyta Honcharov (UKR)	6–8	Yun Jun-sik (KOR)
Andrii Biliichuk (UKR)	4–9	Peiman Biabani (CAN)
Round 4
Nico Megerle (GER)	7–0	Dmytro Mykhniuk (UKR)
Final III–V
Mykyta Honcharov (UKR)	5–1	Nico Megerle (GER)
Krzysztof Bieńkowski (POL)	1–6	Andrii Biliichuk (UKR)
Final I–II
Yun Jun-sik (KOR)	4–6	Peiman Biabani (CAN)

==== Men's freestyle 70 kg ====
	Score	
Round 1
Oleksii Boruta (UKR)	4–0	Kevin Henkel (GER)
Jeon Jin-su (KOR)	0–5	Vasyl Shuptar (UKR)
Round 2
Zelimkhan Mutsukhaev (POL)	2–9 Fall	Oleksii Boruta (UKR)
Brayton Lee (USA)	4–1	Jeon Jin-su (KOR)
Round 3
Kevin Henkel (GER)	11–0	Zelimkhan Mutsukhaev (POL)
Vasyl Shuptar (UKR)	2–2	Brayton Lee (USA)
Final III–V
Kevin Henkel (GER)	5–7	Jeon Jin-su (KOR)
Vasyl Shuptar (UKR)	4–2	Zelimkhan Mutsukhaev (POL)
Final I–II
Oleksii Boruta (UKR)	2–4	Brayton Lee (USA)

==== Men's freestyle 74 kg ====
	Score	
Round 1
Joey Blaze (USA)	4–2	Ivan Kusyak (UKR)
Saad Bouguerra (ALG)	0–10	Otari Bagauri (GEO)
Mykyta Morhun (UKR)	10–4	Szymon Wojtkowski (POL)
Kamil Rybicki (POL)	11–0	Fabian Niedźwiedzki (POL)
Round 2
Ivan Kusyak (UKR)	10–0	Saad Bouguerra (ALG)
Szymon Wojtkowski (POL)	10–0	Fabian Niedźwiedzki (POL)
Joey Blaze (USA)	12–6 Fall	Otari Bagauri (GEO)
Mykyta Morhun (UKR)	8–1 Fall	Kamil Rybicki (POL)
Final III–V
Otari Bagauri (GEO)	8–0	Ivan Kusyak (UKR)
Szymon Wojtkowski (POL)	0–3	Kamil Rybicki (POL)
Final I–II
Joey Blaze (USA)	6–2	Mykyta Morhun (UKR)

==== Men's freestyle 79 kg ====
	Score	
Round 1
Dean Hamiti (USA)	0–10	Vasyl Mykhailov (UKR)
Simon Ruiz (USA)	11–1	Codei Khawaja (SRB)
Pouria Taherkhani (GER)	0–4	Otari Adeishvili (GEO)
Umar Mavlaev (SUI)	10–0	Joona Vuoti (FIN)
Mateusz Pędzicki (POL)	9–0	Kimi Käppeli (SUI)
Aleksandre Meladze (GEO)	11–1	Elias Wile (CAN)
Round 2
Dean Hamiti (USA)	10–0	Codei Khawaja (SRB)
Pouria Taherkhani (GER)	7–3	Joona Vuoti (FIN)
Kimi Käppeli (SUI)	11–0	Elias Wile (CAN)
Abdelkader Ikkal (ALG)	0–10	Vasyl Mykhailov (UKR)
Simon Ruiz (USA)	7–4	Otari Adeishvili (GEO)
Umar Mavlaev (SUI)	11–2	Mateusz Pędzicki (POL)
Round 3
Dean Hamiti (USA)	2–0	Pouria Taherkhani (GER)
Kimi Käppeli (SUI)	4–12	Abdelkader Ikkal (ALG)
Otari Adeishvili (GEO)	12–1	Mateusz Pędzicki (POL)
Aleksandre Meladze (GEO)	1–12	Vasyl Mykhailov (UKR)
Simon Ruiz (USA)	8–1	Umar Mavlaev (SUI)
Round 4
Dean Hamiti (USA)	2–0 Fall	Abdelkader Ikkal (ALG)
Final III–V
Aleksandre Meladze (GEO)	0–2	Otari Adeishvili (GEO)
Dean Hamiti (USA)	9–4	Umar Mavlaev (SUI)
Final I–II
Vasyl Mykhailov (UKR)	6–7	Simon Ruiz (USA)

==== Men's freestyle 86 kg ====
	Score	
Round 1
Filip Błaszczyk (POL)	0–10	Oleksandr Mamrosh (UKR)
Fateh Benferdjallah (ALG)	13–2	Paulius Leščauskas (LTU)
Hwang Tae-gyu (KOR)	4–5	Igor Szucki (POL)
Cezary Sadowski (POL)	8–9	Ivars Samušonoks (LAT)
Joshua Morodion (GER)	4–4	Mukhammed Aliiev (UKR)
Miko Elkala (FIN)	2–2	Giorgi Natchkebia (GEO)
Tamaz Nikoleishvili (GEO)	3–4 Fall	Valentyn Babii (UKR)
Round 2
Filip Błaszczyk (POL)	0–7 Fall	Mukhammed Aliiev (UKR)
Paulius Leščauskas (LTU)	4–10	Giorgi Natchkebia (GEO)
Hwang Tae-gyu (KOR)	0–3 Fall	Tamaz Nikoleishvili (GEO)
Denys Bykov (UKR)	1–3	Oleksandr Mamrosh (UKR)
Joshua Morodion (GER)	5–4	Fateh Benferdjallah (ALG)
Miko Elkala (FIN)	7–0	Igor Szucki (POL)
Valentyn Babii (UKR)	6–16	Ivars Samušonoks (LAT)
Round 3
Cezary Sadowski (POL)	6–5	Mukhammed Aliiev (UKR)
Giorgi Natchkebia (GEO)	6–1	Tamaz Nikoleishvili (GEO)
Denys Bykov (UKR)	6–3	Fateh Benferdjallah (ALG)
Igor Szucki (POL)	2–3	Valentyn Babii (UKR)
Oleksandr Mamrosh (UKR)	6–8	Joshua Morodion (GER)
Miko Elkala (FIN)	0–7	Ivars Samušonoks (LAT)
Round 4
Cezary Sadowski (POL)	10–0	Giorgi Natchkebia (GEO)
Denys Bykov (UKR)	8–4	Valentyn Babii (UKR)
Final III–V
Denys Bykov (UKR)	7–1	Miko Elkala (FIN)
Oleksandr Mamrosh (UKR)	5–4	Cezary Sadowski (POL)
Final I–II
Joshua Morodion (GER)	8–2	Ivars Samušonoks (LAT)

==== Men's freestyle 92 kg ====
	Score	
Round 1
Dustin Plott (USA)	8–2 Ret	Filip Rogut (POL)
Joseph De Maio (CAN)	0–10	Iuza Tsertsvadze (GEO)
Krisztián Angyal (HUN)	0–6	Ivan Chornohuz (UKR)
Lars Schäfle (GER)	2–1	Filip Szucki (POL)
Andrew Johnson (CAN)	0–5	Wiktor Hasa (POL)
Round 2
Filip Rogut (POL)	10–0	Joseph De Maio (CAN)
Krisztián Angyal (HUN)	2–13	Filip Szucki (POL)
Dustin Plott (USA)	15–5	Iuza Tsertsvadze (GEO)
Round 3
Andrew Johnson (CAN)	3–9	Filip Rogut (POL)
Filip Szucki (POL)	8–14	Iuza Tsertsvadze (GEO)
Dustin Plott (USA)	6–9	Ivan Chornohuz (UKR)
Lars Schäfle (GER)	2–2	Wiktor Hasa (POL)
Final III–V
Dustin Plott (USA)	12–1	Wiktor Hasa (POL)
Filip Rogut (POL)	3–14	Iuza Tsertsvadze (GEO)
Final I–II
Ivan Chornohuz (UKR)	5–10	Lars Schäfle (GER)

==== Men's freestyle 97 kg ====
	Score	
Round 1
Walieddine Kebir (ALG)	6–13 Fall	Richárd Végh (HUN)
Levan Bazadze (GEO)	2–3	Domantas Pauliuščenko (LTU)
Zbigniew Baranowski (POL)	11–0	Taron Shahinyan (POL)
Ertuğrul Ağca (GER)	11–0	Kim Pu-reun (KOR)
David Mchedlidze (UKR)	1–1	Ivan Prymachenko (UKR)
Round 2
Walieddine Kebir (ALG)	0–10	Levan Bazadze (GEO)
Taron Shahinyan (POL)	4–0 Fall	Kim Pu-reun (KOR)
Richárd Végh (HUN)	8–0 3C	Domantas Pauliuščenko (LTU)
Round 3
Ivan Prymachenko (UKR)	10–0 Fall	Levan Bazadze (GEO)
Taron Shahinyan (POL)	WO	Domantas Pauliuščenko (LTU)
Richárd Végh (HUN)	1–4	Zbigniew Baranowski (POL)
Ertuğrul Ağca (GER)	0–3	David Mchedlidze (UKR)
Final III–V
Richárd Végh (HUN)	0–10	Ivan Prymachenko (UKR)
Taron Shahinyan (POL)	0–9	Ertuğrul Ağca (GER)
Final I–II
Zbigniew Baranowski (POL)	3–1	David Mchedlidze (UKR)

==== Men's freestyle 125 kg ====
	Score	
Round 1
Robert Baran (POL)	4–5	Mohsen Siyar (GER)
Giorgi Meshvildishvili (GEO)	6–2	Roger Li (CAN)
Milán Korcsog (HUN)	5–0	Emil Thiele (GER)
Murazi Mchedlidze (UKR)	2–3	Volodymyr Kochanov (UKR)
Round 2
Robert Baran (POL)	6–1	Roger Li (CAN)
Emil Thiele (GER)	1–2	Murazi Mchedlidze (UKR)
Mohsen Siyar (GER)	2–5	Giorgi Meshvildishvili (AZE)
Milán Korcsog (HUN)	0–2	Volodymyr Kochanov (UKR)
Final III–V
Mohsen Siyar (GER)	7–0	Murazi Mchedlidze (UKR)
Robert Baran (POL)	2–0	Milán Korcsog (HUN)
Final I–II
Giorgi Meshvildishvili (AZE)	8–0	Volodymyr Kochanov (UKR)

=== Men's Greco-Roman (Władysław Pytlasiński Cup) ===
==== Men's Greco-Roman 55 kg ====
	Score	
Round 1
Ulan Muratbek Uulu (KGZ)	1–10	Ramaz Silagava (GEO)
Akyikat Kulzhigit Uulu (KGZ)	6–1	Koriun Sahradian (UKR)
Round 2
Ulan Muratbek Uulu (KGZ)	9–7	Akyikat Kulzhigit Uulu (KGZ)
Ramaz Silagava (GEO)	1–6	Koriun Sahradian (UKR)
Round 3
Ulan Muratbek Uulu (KGZ)	0–9	Koriun Sahradian (UKR)
Ramaz Silagava (GEO)	1–2	Akyikat Kulzhigit Uulu (KGZ)

==== Men's Greco-Roman 60 kg ====
	Score	
Round 1
Georgios Scarpello (GER)	6–7	Giorgi Tokhadze (GEO)
Melkamu Fetene (ISR)	6–5	Aibek Aitbekov (KAZ)
Vladyslav Kuzko (UKR)	9–0	Gracjan Jedut (POL)
Iskhar Kurbayev (KAZ)	1–11 Fall	Akyl Sulaimanov (KGZ)
Manvel Khachatryan (ARM)	2–5	Abdelkarim Fergat (ALG)
Round 2
Georgios Scarpello (GER)	3–1	Aibek Aitbekov (KAZ)
Gracjan Jedut (POL)	1–10	Iskhar Kurbayev (KAZ)
Olivier Skrzypczak (POL)	18–8	Giorgi Tokhadze (GEO)
Melkamu Fetene (ISR)	0–4	Vladyslav Kuzko (UKR)
Round 3
Manvel Khachatryan (ARM)	9–0	Georgios Scarpello (GER)
Iskhar Kurbayev (KAZ)	0–8	Giorgi Tokhadze (GEO)
Olivier Skrzypczak (POL)	2–4	Vladyslav Kuzko (UKR)
Akyl Sulaimanov (KGZ)	10–0	Abdelkarim Fergat (ALG)
Round 4
Melkamu Fetene (ISR)	0–8	Manvel Khachatryan (ARM)
Final III–V
Giorgi Tokhadze (GEO)	4–6	Abdelkarim Fergat (ALG)
Olivier Skrzypczak (POL)	5–3	Manvel Khachatryan (ARM)
Final I–II
Vladyslav Kuzko (UKR)	0–10	Akyl Sulaimanov (KGZ)

==== Men's Greco-Roman 63 kg ====
	Score	
Round 1
Nurdaulet Kapas (KAZ)	8–0	Alexander Vafai (SWE)
Bakytzhan Kabdyl (KAZ)	4–3	Hrachya Poghosyan (ARM)
Beka Guruli (GEO)	1–6	Oleksandr Hrushyn (UKR)
Mateusz Szewczuk (POL)	4–3	Saifulla Kurman (KAZ)
Abdeldjebar Djebbari (ALG)	1–9	Zholaman Sharshenbekov (KGZ)
Round 2
Alexander Vafai (SWE)	1–9	Hrachya Poghosyan (ARM)
Beka Guruli (GEO)	1–6	Saifulla Kurman (KAZ)
Algot Gamelius (SWE)	11–3	Nurdaulet Kapas (KAZ)
Bakytzhan Kabdyl (KAZ)	4–3	Oleksandr Hrushyn (UKR)
Round 3
Abdeldjebar Djebbari (ALG)	1–4	Hrachya Poghosyan (ARM)
Saifulla Kurman (KAZ)	5–0 Ret	Nurdaulet Kapas (KAZ)
Algot Gamelius (SWE)	1–3 Fall	Bakytzhan Kabdyl (KAZ)
Mateusz Szewczuk (POL)	0–8	Zholaman Sharshenbekov (KGZ)
Round 4
Oleksandr Hrushyn (UKR)	5–4	Hrachya Poghosyan (ARM)
Final III–V
Algot Gamelius (SWE)	3–5	Saifulla Kurman (KAZ)
Oleksandr Hrushyn (UKR)	8–0	Mateusz Szewczuk (POL)
Final I–II
Bakytzhan Kabdyl (KAZ)	0–10 Fall	Zholaman Sharshenbekov (KGZ)

==== Men's Greco-Roman 67 kg ====
	Score	
Round 1
Andreas Vetsch (SUI)	0–9	Witalis Lazovski (GER)
Diego Chkhikvadze (GEO)	5–2	Adomas Grigaliūnas (LTU)
Michał Biskupski (POL)	1–1	Dinislam Sagitzhan (KAZ)
Arsenii Pashchenko (UKR)	0–8	Arslanbek Salimov (POL)
Tolegen Amirkhanov (KAZ)	1–5	Niklas Öhlén (SWE)
Giorgi Shotadze (GEO)	0–8	Razzak Beishekeev (KGZ)
Maksym Yevtushenko (UKR)	6–1	Tim Bergfalk (SWE)
Elias Mikko (SWE)	0–9	Marco Stoll (GER)
Round 2
Andreas Vetsch (SUI)	5–3	Adomas Grigaliūnas (LTU)
Dinislam Sagitzhan (KAZ)	3–1	Arsenii Pashchenko (UKR)
Tolegen Amirkhanov (KAZ)	0–8	Giorgi Shotadze (GEO)
Tim Bergfalk (SWE)	12–0	Elias Mikko (SWE)
Fayssal Benfredj (ALG)	1–3	Witalis Lazovski (GER)
Diego Chkhikvadze (GEO)	11–0	Michał Biskupski (POL)
Arslanbek Salimov (POL)	8–5	Niklas Öhlén (SWE)
Razzak Beishekeev (KGZ)	9–0	Maksym Yevtushenko (UKR)
Round 3
Andreas Vetsch (SUI)	2–7 Fall	Dinislam Sagitzhan (KAZ)
Giorgi Shotadze (GEO)	3–2	Tim Bergfalk (SWE)
Fayssal Benfredj (ALG)	7–2	Michał Biskupski (POL)
Niklas Öhlén (SWE)	3–1	Maksym Yevtushenko (UKR)
Marco Stoll (GER)	WO	Witalis Lazovski (GER)
Round 4
Andreas Vetsch (SUI)	2–3	Giorgi Shotadze (GEO)
Fayssal Benfredj (ALG)	WO	Marco Stoll (GER)
Witalis Lazovski (GER)	1–4	Diego Chkhikvadze (GEO)
Arslanbek Salimov (POL)	3–11	Razzak Beishekeev (KGZ)
Round 5
Niklas Öhlén (SWE)	8–0	Fayssal Benfredj (ALG)
Final III–V
Witalis Lazovski (GER)	3–1	Niklas Öhlén (SWE)
Giorgi Shotadze (GEO)	9–4	Arslanbek Salimov (POL)
Final I–II
Diego Chkhikvadze (GEO)	9–1	Razzak Beishekeev (KGZ)

==== Men's Greco-Roman 72 kg ====
	Score	
Round 1
Gor Khachatryan (ARM)	6–11	Yryskeldi Khamzaev (KGZ)
Rokas Čepauskas (LTU)	3–1	Michael Portmann (SUI)
Georgios Barbanos (SWE)	2–2	Artur Jeremejev (EST)
Abdelmalek Merabet (ALG)	0–4 Fall	Kristupas Šleiva (LTU)
Parviz Nasibov (UKR)	7–4	Aleksander Mielewczyk (POL)
Nathaniel Phillips (SWE)	1–1	Christoffer Dahlén (SWE)
Oleksii Kalinichenko (UKR)	8–0	Steve Momilia (ITA)
Slavik Galstyan (ARM)	9–0	Piotr Stolarczyk (POL)
Simon Borkenhagen (SWE)	3–1	Kamil Czarnecki (POL)
Round 2
Gor Khachatryan (ARM)	4–2	Michael Portmann (SUI)
Artur Jeremejev (EST)	0–10	Abdelmalek Merabet (ALG)
Aleksander Mielewczyk (POL)	9–0	Nathaniel Phillips (SWE)
Steve Momilia (ITA)	0–5	Piotr Stolarczyk (POL)
Yryskeldi Khamzaev (KGZ)	3–5	Rokas Čepauskas (LTU)
Georgios Barbanos (SWE)	1–10	Kristupas Šleiva (LTU)
Parviz Nasibov (UKR)	3–1	Christoffer Dahlén (SWE)
Oleksii Kalinichenko (UKR)	0–8	Slavik Galstyan (ARM)
Round 3
Kamil Czarnecki (POL)	2–4	Gor Khachatryan (ARM)
Abdelmalek Merabet (ALG)	4–5	Aleksander Mielewczyk (POL)
Piotr Stolarczyk (POL)	5–8	Yryskeldi Khamzaev (KGZ)
Georgios Barbanos (SWE)	3–3	Christoffer Dahlén (SWE)
Simon Borkenhagen (SWE)	1–7	Rokas Čepauskas (LTU)
Round 4
Oleksii Kalinichenko (UKR)	6–3	Gor Khachatryan (ARM)
Aleksander Mielewczyk (POL)	3–4 Fall	Yryskeldi Khamzaev (KGZ)
Georgios Barbanos (SWE)	1–3	Simon Borkenhagen (SWE)
Rokas Čepauskas (LTU)	1–1	Kristupas Šleiva (LTU)
Parviz Nasibov (UKR)	7–0	Slavik Galstyan (ARM)
Round 5
Oleksii Kalinichenko (UKR)	1–3	Simon Borkenhagen (SWE)
Final III–V
Yryskeldi Khamzaev (KGZ)	3–1	Simon Borkenhagen (SWE)
Slavik Galstyan (ARM)	5–1	Rokas Čepauskas (LTU)
Final I–II
Kristupas Šleiva (LTU)	2–4	Parviz Nasibov (UKR)

==== Men's Greco-Roman 77 kg ====
	Score	
Round 1
Tamerlan Shadukayev (KAZ)	4–6	Adam Strandner (SWE)
Malkhas Amoyan (ARM)	11–0 Fall	Ihor Zakharchuk (POL)
Oscar Pettersson (SWE)	0–10	Idris Ibaev (GER)
Azat Sadykov (KAZ)	1–1	Paulius Galkinas (LTU)
Oliver Krüger (DEN)	4–2 Fall	Abdiazim Karabayev (KAZ)
Kaharman Kissymetov (KAZ)	1–7	Hugo Baff (SWE)
Albin Olofsson (SWE)	12–0	Mateusz Bernatek (POL)
Vilius Savickas (LTU)	0–8	Yryskeldi Maksatbek Uulu (KGZ)
Attila Tösmagi (HUN)	1–2	Fritz Reber (SUI)
Calebe Ferreira (BRA)	0–8	Samuel Bellscheidt (GER)
Benjamin Hansen (NOR)	1–9	Ihor Bychkov (UKR)
Chawki Doulache (ALG)	6–6	Artur Politaiev (UKR)
Maurus Zogg (SUI)	10–4 Fall	Giovanni Alessio (ITA)
Round 2
Tamerlan Shadukayev (KAZ)	9–1	Ihor Zakharchuk (POL)
Oscar Pettersson (SWE)	5–4	Paulius Galkinas (LTU)
Oliver Krüger (DEN)	0–8	Kaharman Kissymetov (KAZ)
Mateusz Bernatek (POL)	6–0	Vilius Savickas (LTU)
Attila Tösmagi (HUN)	8–3	Calebe Ferreira (BRA)
Benjamin Hansen (NOR)	0–2	Chawki Doulache (ALG)
Erik Persson (SWE)	2–0	Adam Strandner (SWE)
Malkhas Amoyan (ARM)	4–2	Idris Ibaev (GER)
Azat Sadykov (KAZ)	8–5	Abdiazim Karabayev (KAZ)
Hugo Baff (SWE)	1–1	Albin Olofsson (SWE)
Yryskeldi Maksatbek Uulu (KGZ)	9–0	Fritz Reber (SUI)
Samuel Bellscheidt (GER)	3–1	Ihor Bychkov (UKR)
Maurus Zogg (SUI)	3–6	Artur Politaiev (UKR)
Round 3
Giovanni Alessio (ITA)	0–9	Tamerlan Shadukayev (KAZ)
Oscar Pettersson (SWE)	1–1	Kaharman Kissymetov (KAZ)
Mateusz Bernatek (POL)	7–2	Attila Tösmagi (HUN)
Chawki Doulache (ALG)	2–1	Adam Strandner (SWE)
Idris Ibaev (GER)	8–0	Abdiazim Karabayev (KAZ)
Hugo Baff (SWE)	8–4	Fritz Reber (SUI)
Ihor Bychkov (UKR)	4–1	Maurus Zogg (SUI)
Erik Persson (SWE)	1–4	Malkhas Amoyan (ARM)
Azat Sadykov (KAZ)	1–8	Albin Olofsson (SWE)
Yryskeldi Maksatbek Uulu (KGZ)	5–3	Samuel Bellscheidt (GER)
Round 4
Tamerlan Shadukayev (KAZ)	3–1	Kaharman Kissymetov (KAZ)
Mateusz Bernatek (POL)	5–2	Chawki Doulache (ALG)
Idris Ibaev (GER)	9–1	Hugo Baff (SWE)
Ihor Bychkov (UKR)	1–3	Erik Persson (SWE)
Azat Sadykov (KAZ)	0–9	Samuel Bellscheidt (GER)
Artur Politaiev (UKR)	2–3	Malkhas Amoyan (ARM)
Albin Olofsson (SWE)	10–2	Yryskeldi Maksatbek Uulu (KGZ)
Round 5
Tamerlan Shadukayev (KAZ)	8–1	Mateusz Bernatek (POL)
Idris Ibaev (GER)	9–0	Erik Persson (SWE)
Round 6
Samuel Bellscheidt (GER)	1–3	Tamerlan Shadukayev (KAZ)
Final III–V
Artur Politaiev (UKR)	10–1 Fall	Idris Ibaev (GER)
Tamerlan Shadukayev (KAZ)	4–6	Yryskeldi Maksatbek Uulu (KGZ)
Final I–II
Malkhas Amoyan (ARM)	4–0	Albin Olofsson (SWE)

==== Men's Greco-Roman 82 kg ====
	Score	
Round 1
Ruslan Abdiiev (UKR)	9–0	Islam Aliev (POL)
Erik Löser (GER)	4–5	Mykyta Politaiev (UKR)
Ramon Betschart (SUI)	6–5	Dias Kaltay (KAZ)
Akrem Boudjemline (ALG)	0–9	Alexander Johansson (SWE)
Iznovr Abayev (KAZ)	0–9	Ekke Leitham (EST)
Round 2
Islam Aliev (POL)	4–2	Erik Löser (GER)
Dias Kaltay (KAZ)	5–1	Akrem Boudjemline (ALG)
Ruslan Abdiiev (UKR)	2–1	Mykyta Politaiev (UKR)
Round 3
Iznovr Abayev (KAZ)	WO	Islam Aliev (POL)
Dias Kaltay (KAZ)	5–3	Mykyta Politaiev (UKR)
Ruslan Abdiiev (UKR)	3–1	Ramon Betschart (SUI)
Alexander Johansson (SWE)	5–0	Ekke Leitham (EST)
Final III–V
Dias Kaltay (KAZ)	11–8	Ekke Leitham (EST)
Ramon Betschart (SUI)	11–0	Islam Aliev (POL)
Final I–II
Ruslan Abdiiev (UKR)	0–2	Alexander Johansson (SWE)

==== Men's Greco-Roman 87 kg ====
	Score	
Round 1
Kauan Gomes (BRA)	0–8	Damian von Euw (SUI)
Szymon Szymonowicz (POL)	5–3	Achiko Bolkvadze (GEO)
Marcel Sterkenburg (NED)	1–8	Lasha Gobadze (GEO)
Vigen Nazaryan (ARM)	12–5	Martin Ljosåk (NOR)
Yaroslav Filchakov (UKR)	3–1	Arkadiusz Kułynycz (POL)
Aivengo Rikadze (GEO)	1–1	István Takács (HUN)
Timur Ospanov (KAZ)	0–6	Hamza Sertcanli (SWE)
Gurami Khetsuriani (GEO)	5–8	Asan Zhanyshov (KGZ)
Round 2
Kauan Gomes (BRA)	0–8	Achiko Bolkvadze (GEO)
Marcel Sterkenburg (NED)	5–1	Martin Ljosåk (NOR)
Arkadiusz Kułynycz (POL)	5–0	István Takács (HUN)
Timur Ospanov (KAZ)	3–4	Gurami Khetsuriani (GEO)
Damian von Euw (SUI)	5–1 Fall	Szymon Szymonowicz (POL)
Lasha Gobadze (GEO)	3–1	Vigen Nazaryan (ARM)
Yaroslav Filchakov (UKR)	1–4	Aivengo Rikadze (GEO)
Hamza Sertcanli (SWE)	1–2 Fall	Asan Zhanyshov (KGZ)
Round 3
Achiko Bolkvadze (GEO)	1–9	Marcel Sterkenburg (NED)
Arkadiusz Kułynycz (POL)	3–6	Gurami Khetsuriani (GEO)
Szymon Szymonowicz (POL)	1–6	Vigen Nazaryan (ARM)
Yaroslav Filchakov (UKR)	3–0	Hamza Sertcanli (SWE)
Damian von Euw (SUI)	1–3	Lasha Gobadze (GEO)
Aivengo Rikadze (GEO)	11–3	Asan Zhanyshov (KGZ)
Round 4
Marcel Sterkenburg (NED)	1–1	Gurami Khetsuriani (GEO)
Vigen Nazaryan (ARM)	2–5	Yaroslav Filchakov (UKR)
Final III–V
Damian von Euw (SUI)	1–8	Gurami Khetsuriani (GEO)
Yaroslav Filchakov (UKR)	1–4	Asan Zhanyshov (KGZ)
Final I–II
Lasha Gobadze (GEO)	2–1	Aivengo Rikadze (GEO)

==== Men's Greco-Roman 97 kg ====
	Score	
Round 1
Yerzat Yerlanov (KAZ)	8–2 Fall	Vladlen Kozlyuk (UKR)
Richard Karelson (EST)	3–0	Artsiom Shumski (POL)
Uzur Dzhuzupbekov (KGZ)	0–3	Aleksandar Stjepanetic (SWE)
Tadeusz Michalik (POL)	9–0	Amine Bendjelloul (ALG)
Algot Källman (SWE)	1–5	Gerard Kurniczak (POL)
Connor Sammet (GER)	5–1	Igor Shepetun (POL)
Round 2
Vladlen Kozlyuk (UKR)	8–7	Artsiom Shumski (POL)
Uzur Dzhuzupbekov (KGZ)	7–1	Amine Bendjelloul (ALG)
Algot Källman (SWE)	3–5	Igor Shepetun (POL)
Mindaugas Venckaitis (LTU)	9–0	Yerzat Yerlanov (KAZ)
Richard Karelson (EST)	1–1	Aleksandar Stjepanetic (SWE)
Tadeusz Michalik (POL)	0–6	Gerard Kurniczak (POL)
Round 3
Vladlen Kozlyuk (UKR)	9–4	Uzur Dzhuzupbekov (KGZ)
Igor Shepetun (POL)	0–10	Yerzat Yerlanov (KAZ)
Richard Karelson (EST)	4–3	Tadeusz Michalik (POL)
Connor Sammet (GER)	2–4	Mindaugas Venckaitis (LTU)
Aleksandar Stjepanetic (SWE)	6–3	Gerard Kurniczak (POL)
Round 4
Vladlen Kozlyuk (UKR)	3–0	Richard Karelson (EST)
Final III–V
Connor Sammet (GER)	WO	Yerzat Yerlanov (KAZ)
Vladlen Kozlyuk (UKR)	5–1	Gerard Kurniczak (POL)
Final I–II
Mindaugas Venckaitis (LTU)	3–3	Aleksandar Stjepanetic (SWE)

==== Men's Greco-Roman 130 kg ====
	Score	
Round 1
Mykola Kuchmii (UKR)	9–0	Erlan Manatbekov (KGZ)
Sulkhan Buidze (GEO)	6–4	Mykhailo Vyshnyvetskyi (UKR)
Heiki Nabi (EST)	1–3	Romas Fridrikas (LTU)
Luka Gabisonia (GEO)	6–8	Jacob Logård (SWE)
Franz Richter (GER)	8–0 Fall	Saba Chilashvili (GEO)
Mantas Knystautas (LTU)	3–3	Razmik Kurdyan (ARM)
Round 2
Erlan Manatbekov (KGZ)	0–8	Mykhailo Vyshnyvetskyi (UKR)
Heiki Nabi (EST)	3–0	Luka Gabisonia (GEO)
Saba Chilashvili (GEO)	WO	Razmik Kurdyan (ARM)
Mykola Kuchmii (UKR)	2–0	Sulkhan Buidze (GEO)
Romas Fridrikas (LTU)	1–1	Jacob Logård (SWE)
Round 3
Mykhailo Vyshnyvetskyi (UKR)	1–3	Heiki Nabi (EST)
Razmik Kurdyan (ARM)	4–3	Sulkhan Buidze (GEO)
Mykola Kuchmii (UKR)	1–1	Jacob Logård (SWE)
Franz Richter (GER)	2–1	Mantas Knystautas (LTU)
Round 4
Romas Fridrikas (LTU)	1–1	Razmik Kurdyan (ARM)
Final III–V
Jacob Logård (SWE)	1–2	Razmik Kurdyan (ARM)
Heiki Nabi (EST)	2–1	Mantas Knystautas (LTU)
Final I–II
Mykola Kuchmii (UKR)	1–1	Franz Richter (GER)

=== Women's freestyle (Poland Open) ===
==== Women's freestyle 50 kg ====
	Score	
Round 1
Gabija Dilytė (LTU)	1–2	Cheima Chebila (ALG)
Nelly Johansson (SWE)	0–11	Svetlana Ankicheva (KAZ)
Agata Walerzak (POL)	0–5	Viktoriia Slobodeniuk (UKR)
Amanda Tomczyk (POL)	2–10	Katie Dutchak (CAN)
Aida Kerymova (UKR)	0–10	Oksana Livach (UKR)
Cheon Ju-young (KOR)	8–8 Fall	Kendra Ryan (USA)
Svenja Jungo (SUI)	1–1	Emanuela Liuzzi (ITA)
Round 2
Gabija Dilytė (LTU)	8–2	Nelly Johansson (SWE)
Agata Walerzak (POL)	2–1	Amanda Tomczyk (POL)
Aida Kerymova (UKR)	6–2 Fall	Kendra Ryan (USA)
Cheima Chebila (ALG)	1–7	Svetlana Ankicheva (KAZ)
Viktoriia Slobodeniuk (UKR)	8–6	Katie Dutchak (CAN)
Oksana Livach (UKR)	10–0	Cheon Ju-young (KOR)
Round 3
Svenja Jungo (SUI)	1–1	Gabija Dilytė (LTU)
Agata Walerzak (POL)	5–2 Fall	Aida Kerymova (UKR)
Cheima Chebila (ALG)	3–6	Katie Dutchak (CAN)
Emanuela Liuzzi (ITA)	6–2	Svetlana Ankicheva (KAZ)
Viktoriia Slobodeniuk (UKR)	0–10	Oksana Livach (UKR)
Round 4
Cheon Ju-young (KOR)	2–4	Svenja Jungo (SUI)
Aida Kerymova (UKR)	4–2 Fall	Katie Dutchak (CAN)
Final III–V
Svetlana Ankicheva (KAZ)	0–5	Svenja Jungo (SUI)
Aida Kerymova (UKR)	WO	Viktoriia Slobodeniuk (UKR)
Final I–II
Emanuela Liuzzi (ITA)	0–5	Oksana Livach (UKR)

==== Women's freestyle 53 kg ====
	Score	
Round 1
Sydney Petzinger (USA)	3–3	Nataliia Klivchutska (UKR)
Laura Stanelytė (LTU)	0–3	Anastasiia Lebedieva (POL)
Ellen Östman (SWE)	3–4	Vestina Danisevičiūtė (LTU)
Roksana Zasina (POL)	1–8	Annika Wendle (GER)
Liliia Malanchuk (UKR)	1–10	Jonna Malmgren (SWE)
Snizhana Onufriieva (UKR)	11–0 Fall	Zeinep Bayanova (KAZ)
Round 2
Sydney Petzinger (USA)	10–0	Laura Stanelytė (LTU)
Ellen Östman (SWE)	1–12	Roksana Zasina (POL)
Liliia Malanchuk (UKR)	WO	Zeinep Bayanova (KAZ)
Nataliia Klivchutska (UKR)	11–0	Anastasiia Lebedieva (POL)
Vestina Danisevičiūtė (LTU)	1–7 Fall	Annika Wendle (GER)
Round 3
Sydney Petzinger (USA)	2–12	Roksana Zasina (POL)
Liliia Malanchuk (UKR)	WO	Anastasiia Lebedieva (POL)
Nataliia Klivchutska (UKR)	0–7 Fall	Annika Wendle (GER)
Jonna Malmgren (SWE)	12–1	Snizhana Onufriieva (UKR)
Round 4
Vestina Danisevičiūtė (LTU)	0–10	Roksana Zasina (POL)
Final III–V
Nataliia Klivchutska (UKR)	1–5 Fall	Liliia Malanchuk (UKR)
Roksana Zasina (POL)	2–5	Snizhana Onufriieva (UKR)
Final I–II
Annika Wendle (GER)	0–11	Jonna Malmgren (SWE)

==== Women's freestyle 55 kg ====
	Score	
Round 1
Zulfiya Yakhyarova (KAZ)	0–11 Fall	Oleksandra Khomenets (UKR)
Amory Andrich (GER)	0–6 Fall	Albina Rillia (UKR)
Round 2
Patrycja Strzelczyk (POL)	1–7	Zulfiya Yakhyarova (KAZ)
Oleksandra Khomenets (UKR)	10–4	Amory Andrich (GER)
Round 3
Albina Rillia (UKR)	6–1	Zulfiya Yakhyarova (KAZ)
Oleksandra Khomenets (UKR)	5–0 Fall	Patrycja Strzelczyk (POL)
Round 4
Amory Andrich (GER)	5–0 Fall	Zulfiya Yakhyarova (KAZ)
Albina Rillia (UKR)	3–2	Patrycja Strzelczyk (POL)
Round 5
Oleksandra Khomenets (UKR)	6–4	Albina Rillia (UKR)
Amory Andrich (GER)	7–0 Fall	Patrycja Strzelczyk (POL)

==== Women's freestyle 57 kg ====
	Score	
Round 1
Inna Alimova (LTU)	1–2	Evelina Hulthén (SWE)
Jenna Hemiä (FIN)	16–6	Alyssa Mahan (USA)
Solomiia Vynnyk (UKR)	4–0 Fall	Laura Almaganbetova (KAZ)
Nikola Wiśniewska (POL)	3–11 Fall	Nilufar Raimova (KAZ)
Marie Trayer (GER)	4–12 Fall	Mia Friesen (CAN)
Magdalena Głodek (POL)	7–11	Tamara Dollák (HUN)
Round 2
Inna Alimova (LTU)	10–4	Alyssa Mahan (USA)
Laura Almaganbetova (KAZ)	4–2 Fall	Nikola Wiśniewska (POL)
Marie Trayer (GER)	4–12 Fall	Magdalena Głodek (POL)
Evelina Hulthén (SWE)	4–1	Jenna Hemiä (FIN)
Solomiia Vynnyk (UKR)	16–6 Fall	Nilufar Raimova (KAZ)
Round 3
Inna Alimova (LTU)	2–4	Laura Almaganbetova (KAZ)
Magdalena Głodek (POL)	5–3	Jenna Hemiä (FIN)
Evelina Hulthén (SWE)	4–15	Solomiia Vynnyk (UKR)
Mia Friesen (CAN)	9–10	Tamara Dollák (HUN)
Round 4
Nilufar Raimova (KAZ)	5–0	Laura Almaganbetova (KAZ)
Final III–V
Nilufar Raimova (KAZ)	6–10	Mia Friesen (CAN)
Evelina Hulthén (SWE)	5–4	Magdalena Głodek (POL)
Final I–II
Solomiia Vynnyk (UKR)	11–1	Tamara Dollák (HUN)

==== Women's freestyle 59 kg ====
	Score	
Round 1
Brenda Reyna (USA)	0–10	Elena Brugger (GER)
Othelie Høie (NOR)	14–15	Olha Padoshyk (POL)
Aleksandra Witos (POL)	1–12	Erika Bognár (HUN)
Yuliia Pakhniuk (UKR)	5–6	Luna Rothenberger (GER)
Anna Michalcová (CZE)	0–10	Alexis Janiak (USA)
Julia Nowicka (POL)	3–1	Marta Gajowniczek (POL)
Mariia Vynnyk (UKR)	10–0	Éda Balázs (HUN)
Round 2
Brenda Reyna (USA)	0–10	Othelie Høie (NOR)
Aleksandra Witos (POL)	4–4 Fall	Yuliia Pakhniuk (UKR)
Anna Michalcová (CZE)	10–2	Marta Gajowniczek (POL)
Elena Brugger (GER)	10–0	Olha Padoshyk (POL)
Erika Bognár (HUN)	10–0	Luna Rothenberger (GER)
Alexis Janiak (USA)	10–0	Julia Nowicka (POL)
Round 3
Éda Balázs (HUN)	1–6	Othelie Høie (NOR)
Yuliia Pakhniuk (UKR)	12–0 Fall	Anna Michalcová (CZE)
Olha Padoshyk (POL)	WO	Luna Rothenberger (GER)
Mariia Vynnyk (UKR)	10–0	Elena Brugger (GER)
Erika Bognár (HUN)	3–6	Alexis Janiak (USA)
Round 4
Julia Nowicka (POL)	0–7 Fall	Yuliia Pakhniuk (UKR)
Othelie Høie (NOR)	11–0	Luna Rothenberger (GER)
Final III–V
Elena Brugger (GER)	4–0	Othelie Høie (NOR)
Yuliia Pakhniuk (UKR)	0–6	Erika Bognár (HUN)
Final I–II
Mariia Vynnyk (UKR)	10–0	Alexis Janiak (USA)

==== Women's freestyle 62 kg ====
	Score	
Round 1
Alara Boyd (USA)	8–6	Tynys Dubek (KAZ)
Hanna Errthum (USA)	15–6 Fall	Nikolett Szabó (HUN)
Johanna Lindborg (SWE)	4–0 Fall	Luisa Scheel (GER)
Agnes Nygren (SWE)	4–0 Fall	Bae Seo-yeon (KOR)
Alicja Nowosad (POL)	4–6	Iryna Bondar (UKR)
Round 2
Tynys Dubek (KAZ)	14–7	Nikolett Szabó (HUN)
Luisa Scheel (GER)	9–8	Bae Seo-yeon (KOR)
Aurora Campagna (ITA)	0–5	Alara Boyd (USA)
Hanna Errthum (USA)	0–10	Johanna Lindborg (SWE)
Round 3
Alicja Nowosad (POL)	8–3 Fall	Tynys Dubek (KAZ)
Luisa Scheel (GER)	0–8 Fall	Aurora Campagna (ITA)
Alara Boyd (USA)	1–8 Fall	Johanna Lindborg (SWE)
Agnes Nygren (SWE)	0–4 Fall	Iryna Bondar (UKR)
Round 4
Hanna Errthum (USA)	0–4 Fall	Alicja Nowosad (POL)
Final III–V
Aurora Campagna (ITA)	10–0	Agnes Nygren (SWE)
Alara Boyd (USA)	6–13	Alicja Nowosad (POL)
Final I–II
Johanna Lindborg (SWE)	0–5	Iryna Bondar (UKR)

==== Women's freestyle 65 kg ====
	Score	
Round 1
Madeline Kubicki (USA)	10–3	Monika Jaskuła (POL)
Bianca Contrafatto (ITA)	0–13	Enikő Elekes (HUN)
Maria Sawiak (CAN)	6–8 Fall	Yelena Shalygina (KAZ)
Nina Makem (USA)	5–16	Jennifer Rogers (USA)
Vanja Gersak-Perez (GER)	2–6	Elma Zeidlere (LAT)
Round 2
Monika Jaskuła (POL)	10–10	Bianca Contrafatto (ITA)
Maria Sawiak (CAN)}	0–10	Nina Makem (USA)
Madeline Kubicki (USA)	0–10	Enikő Elekes (HUN)
Round 3
Vanja Gersak-Perez (GER)	4–2 Fall	Bianca Contrafatto (ITA)
Nina Makem (USA)	10–0	Madeline Kubicki (USA)
Enikő Elekes (HUN)	11–0	Yelena Shalygina (KAZ)
Jennifer Rogers (USA)	10–0	Elma Zeidlere (LAT)
Final III–V
Yelena Shalygina (KAZ)	5–8	Vanja Gersak-Perez (GER)
Nina Makem (USA)	6–0 Fall	Elma Zeidlere (LAT)
Final I–II
Enikő Elekes (HUN)	14–9	Jennifer Rogers (USA)

==== Women's freestyle 68 kg ====
	Score	
Round 1
Alīna Antipova (LAT)	0–10	Laura Godino (ITA)
Adéla Hanzlíčková (CZE)	6–4 Fall	Irina Kazyulina (KAZ)
Manola Skobelska (UKR)	4–1	Beibit Seidualy (KAZ)
Sophia Schäfle (GER)	9–1	Solin Piearcy (USA)
Tindra Sjöberg (SWE)	6–0 Fall	Elleni Johnson (USA)
Gabriela Rocha (BRA)	3–3	Karolina Domaszuk (POL)
Gerda Barth (GER)	6–2 Fall	Daniela Tkachuk (POL)
Round 2
Alīna Antipova (LAT)	4–8	Irina Kazyulina (KAZ)
Beibit Seidualy (KAZ)	4–8 Fall	Solin Piearcy (USA)
Elleni Johnson (USA)	0–11	Gabriela Rocha (BRA)
Laura Godino (ITA)	WO	Adéla Hanzlíčková (CZE)
Manola Skobelska (UKR)	4–6 Fall	Sophia Schäfle (GER)
Tindra Sjöberg (SWE)	3–0 Fall	Karolina Domaszuk (POL)
Round 3
Daniela Tkachuk (POL)	6–0 Fall	Irina Kazyulina (KAZ)
Solin Piearcy (USA)	0–5	Gabriela Rocha (BRA)
Adéla Hanzlíčková (CZE)	WO	Manola Skobelska (UKR)
Gerda Barth (GER)	2–0	Laura Godino (ITA)
Sophia Schäfle (GER)	2–8 Fall	Tindra Sjöberg (SWE)
Round 4
Karolina Domaszuk (POL)	WO	Daniela Tkachuk (POL)
Gabriela Rocha (BRA)	0–2 Fall	Manola Skobelska (UKR)
Final III–V
Laura Godino (ITA)	3–3	Manola Skobelska (UKR)
Karolina Domaszuk (POL)	0–7	Sophia Schäfle (GER)
Final I–II
Gerda Barth (GER)	0–4 Fall	Tindra Sjöberg (SWE)

==== Women's freestyle 72 kg ====
	Score	
Round 1
Kaylynn Albrecht (USA)	2–1	Alexandria Alli (USA)
Augustė Gendvilaitė (LTU)	0–10 Fall	Iryna Zablotska (UKR)
Round 2
Zhamila Bakbergenova (KAZ)	WO	Kaylynn Albrecht (USA)
Zsuzsanna Molnár (SVK)	8–0 Fall	Augustė Gendvilaitė (LTU)
Round 3
Alexandria Alli (USA)	WO	Zhamila Bakbergenova (KAZ)
Iryna Zablotska (UKR)	7–11	Zsuzsanna Molnár (SVK)
Final III–V
Alexandria Alli (USA)	10–0	Augustė Gendvilaitė (LTU)
Iryna Zablotska (UKR)	WO	Zhamila Bakbergenova (KAZ)
Final I–II
Kaylynn Albrecht (USA)	9–2	Zsuzsanna Molnár (SVK)

==== Women's freestyle 76 kg ====
	Score	
Round 1
Joye Levendusky (USA)	1–12	Elmira Syzdykova (KAZ)
Enrica Rinaldi (ITA)	6–0	Elvira Braun (SWE)
Kamilė Gaučaitė (LTU)	0–11	Anastasiya Alpyeyeva (UKR)
Patrycja Cuber (POL)	0–11	Thamires Machado (BRA)
Round 2
Joye Levendusky (USA)	10–0	Elvira Braun (SWE)
Kamilė Gaučaitė (LTU)	WO	Patrycja Cuber (POL)
Shenita Lawson (USA)	0–7 Fall	Elmira Syzdykova (KAZ)
Round 3
Anastasiya Alpyeyeva (UKR)	0–11	Thamires Machado (BRA)
Joye Levendusky (USA)	6–1	Shenita Lawson (USA)
Elmira Syzdykova (KAZ)	11–7 Fall	Enrica Rinaldi (ITA)
Final III–V
Joye Levendusky (USA)	0–9	Anastasiya Alpyeyeva (UKR)
Enrica Rinaldi (ITA)	3–0	Patrycja Cuber (POL)
Final I–II
Elmira Syzdykova (KAZ)	WO	Thamires Machado (BRA)
