= 2020 European Wrestling Championships – Men's Greco-Roman 87 kg =

Wrestling competition

The men's Greco-Roman 87 kg is a competition featured at the 2020 European Wrestling Championships, and was held in Rome, Italy on February 10 and February 11.

== Medalists ==
Gold	Semen Novikov; Ukraine
Silver	Viktor Lőrincz; Hungary
Bronze	Aleksandr Komarov; Russia
Bronze	Islam Abbasov; Azerbaijan

== Results ==
Legend

- F — Won by fall

=== Final ===
Final
Semen Novikov (UKR)	7
Viktor Lőrincz (HUN)	1

=== Top half ===
Round of 32

Round of 16
Tornike Dzamashvili (GEO)	3
Maksim Manukyan (ARM)	1
Aleksandr Komarov (RUS)	8
Ramon Betschart (SUI)	0
Jesús Gasca (ESP)	0
Semen Novikov (UKR)	9
Metehan Başar (TUR)	4
Erik Int (EST)	0

Quarterfinals
Tornike Dzamashvili (GEO)	2
Aleksandr Komarov (RUS)	6
Semen Novikov (UKR)	7
Metehan Başar (TUR)	2

Semifinals
Aleksandr Komarov (RUS)	3
Semen Novikov (UKR)	6

=== Bottom half ===
Round of 32
Tarek Abdelslam (BUL)	3
Petr Novák (CZE)	1
Vjekoslav Luburić (CRO)	0
Arkadiusz Kułynycz (POL)	5
Kiryl Maskevich (BLR)	2
Islam Abbasov (AZE)	3

Round of 16
Eividas Stankevičius (LTU)	8
Zurabi Datunashvili (SRB)	3
Mirco Minguzzi (ITA)	2
Viktor Lőrincz (HUN)	7
Emil Sandahl (SWE)	0
Tarek Abdelslam (BUL)	3
Arkadiusz Kułynycz (POL)	1
Islam Abbasov (AZE)	3

Quarterfinals
Eividas Stankevičius (LTU)	0
Viktor Lőrincz (HUN)	9
Tarek Abdelslam (BUL)	3
Islam Abbasov (AZE)	4^{F}

Semifinals
Viktor Lőrincz (HUN)	6
Islam Abbasov (AZE)	1

=== Repechage ===
Repechage round 2
Jesús Gasca (ESP)	0
Metehan Başar (TUR)	3
Mirco Minguzzi (ITA)	2
Eividas Stankevičius (LTU)	10

Bronze medal match
Metehan Başar (TUR)	1
Aleksandr Komarov (RUS)	3
Eividas Stankevičius (LTU)	2
Islam Abbasov (AZE)	6

== Final standing ==
Rank	Athlete
1st place, gold medalist(s)	Semen Novikov (UKR)
2nd place, silver medalist(s)	Viktor Lőrincz (HUN)
3rd place, bronze medalist(s)	Aleksandr Komarov (RUS)
3rd place, bronze medalist(s)	Islam Abbasov (AZE)
5	Metehan Başar (TUR)
5	Eividas Stankevičius (LTU)
7	Tarek Abdelslam (BUL)
8	Arkadiusz Kułynycz (POL)
9	Tornike Dzamashvili (GEO)
10	Mirco Minguzzi (ITA)
11	Zurabi Datunashvili (SRB)
12	Kiryl Maskevich (BLR)
13	Maksim Manukyan (ARM)
14	Petr Novák (CZE)
15	Emil Sandahl (SWE)
16	Erik Int (EST)
17	Vjekoslav Luburić (CRO)
18	Ramon Betschart (SUI)
19	Jesús Gasca (ESP)
