= Wrestling at the 2022 Mediterranean Games – Men's Greco-Roman 87 kg =

Wrestling competitions

Men's Greco-Roman 87 kg at the 2022 Mediterranean Games
- Venue: EMEC Hall
- Date: 26–27 June
- Competitors: 8 from 8 nations

Medalists
gold medal	Bachir Sid Azara	Algeria
silver medal	Mirco Minguzzi	Italy
bronze medal	Ali Cengiz	Turkey
bronze medal	Noureldin Hassan	Egypt

The Men's Greco-Roman 87 kg competition of the wrestling events at the 2022 Mediterranean Games in Oran, Algeria, was held from 26 June to 27 June at the EMEC Hall.

== Results ==
Legend

- F — Won by fall

Quarterfinals		Semifinals		Final
Johnny Bur (FRA)	0
Bachir Sid Azara (ALG)	3	Bachir Sid Azara (ALG)	4
Vjekoslav Luburić (CRO)	3	Ali Cengiz (TUR)	0
Ali Cengiz (TUR)	6			Bachir Sid Azara (ALG)	5
Mohamed Missaoui (TUN)	0			Mirco Minguzzi (ITA)	0
Noureldin Hassan (EGY)	9	Noureldin Hassan (EGY)	3
Žarko Dickov (SRB)	3	Mirco Minguzzi (ITA)	7
Mirco Minguzzi (ITA)	6

Bronze medals
Johnny Bur (FRA)	0
Ali Cengiz (TUR)	4
Žarko Dickov (SRB)	4
Noureldin Hassan (EGY)	6
