= Wrestling at the 2024 Summer Olympics – Men's Greco-Roman 87 kg =

Men's Greco-Roman 87 kg at the Games of the XXXIII Olympiad
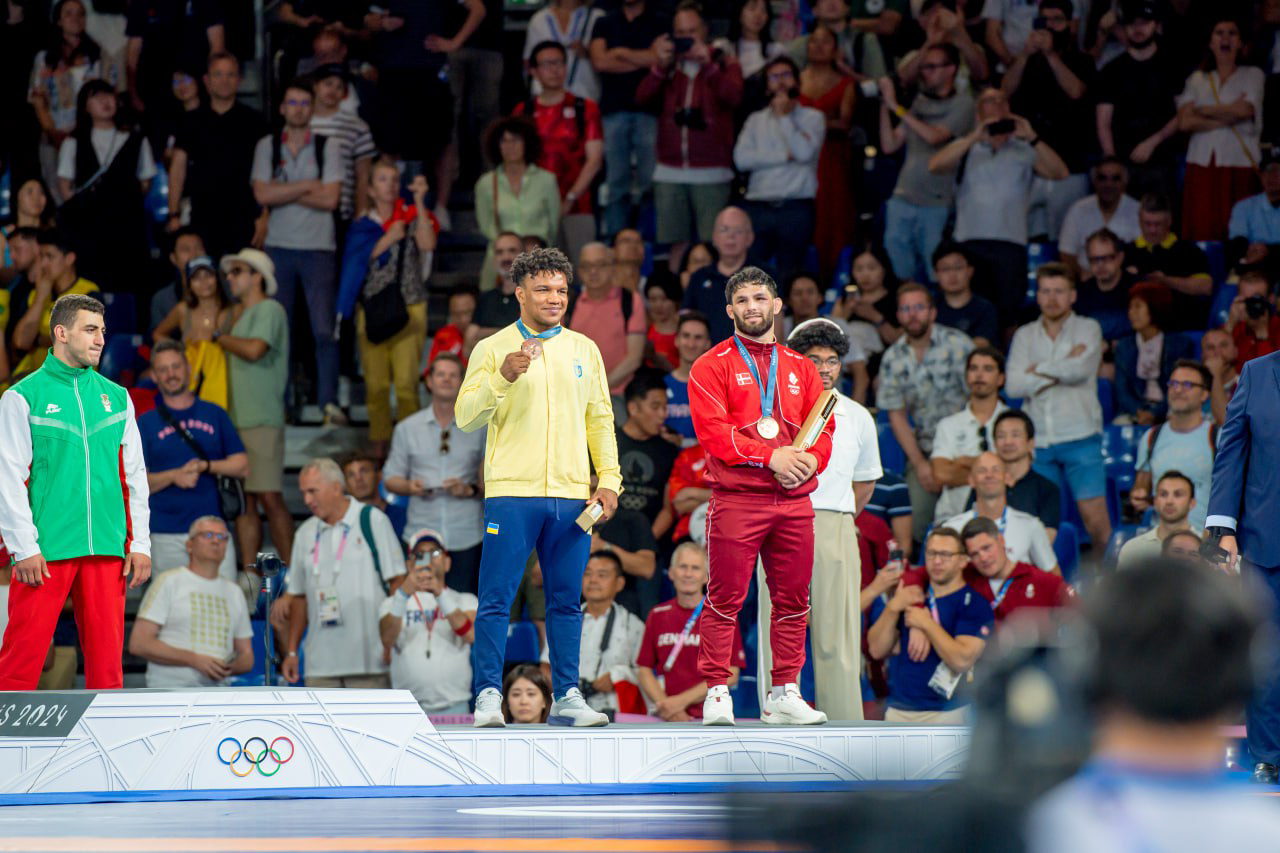
- Victory ceremony
- Venue: Grand Palais Éphémère
- Date: 7-8 August 2024
- Competitors: 16 from 16 nations

Medalists
1st place, gold medalist(s)		Semen Novikov	Bulgaria
2nd place, silver medalist(s)		Alireza Mohmadi	Iran
3rd place, bronze medalist(s)		Zhan Beleniuk	Ukraine
3rd place, bronze medalist(s)		Turpal Bisultanov	Denmark

Men's Greco-Roman 87 kg competition at the 2024 Summer Olympics in Paris, France, took place on 7–8 August 2024 at the Grand Palais Éphémère in Champ de Mars.

== Background ==
Semen Novikov became the Olympic champion, winning over Alireza Mohmadi in the final. The defending champion, Zhan Beleniuk, as well as Turpal Bisultanov, won bronze medals.

== Format ==
This Greco-Roman competition consists of a single-elimination tournament, with a repechage used to determine the winner of two bronze medals. The two finalists face off for gold and silver medals. Each wrestler who loses to one of the two finalists moves into the repechage, culminating in a pair of bronze medal matches featuring the semifinal losers each facing the remaining repechage opponent from their half of the bracket.

== Rules ==
A typical bout consists of two halves of three minutes each separated by a 30-second break. The two competitors compete on a mat, which is nine meters in diameter. Wrestlers try to score points by executing various legal maneuvers. Points ranging from one to five are awarded by the mat referee depending on the degree of difficulty of the maneuvers. Points are also awarded to the opponent in case of infractions such as illegal holds, passivity etc. A wrestler is automatically disqualified if three cautions are awarded during a bout. Forcing an opponent's shoulders to the mat results in an instant victory by fall.

During the course of a match, if a wrestler builds a 10-point advantage over the opponent, the bout is stopped and the leader is declared as the winner by technical superiority. The total scores are totaled at the end of the stipulated six-minute period, and the wrestler with the maximum points wins. In case of a tie, the wrestler who has scored the last point is declared the winner. A competitor might also be declared a winner if the opponent does not turn up or is medically unfit to compete.

== Qualification ==
Sixteen quota places were available with each nation restricted to a maximum of one spot. Five quota places were awarded at the 2023 World Wrestling Championships, which took place from the 16th to 24th of September in Belgrade, Serbia. The finalists of each category in the four continental qualification tournaments (Asia, Europe, the Americas, and the joint Africa & Oceania) were awarded quota places. The remainder of the total quota was allocated at the 2024 World Wrestling Olympic Qualification Tournament, offering a minimum of three quota places.

== Schedule ==
All times are Central European Time (UTC+02:00)

Date	Time	Event
7 August 2024	11:00	Qualification rounds
7 August 2024	18:15	Semifinals
8 August 2024	11:00	Repechage
8 August 2024	18:15	Finals

== Results ==
Sixteen athletes qualified for the competition.

Legend

- F — Won by fall

=== Main bracket ===
Round of 16
Ali Cengiz (TUR)	3
Arkadiusz Kułynycz (POL)	5
Alireza Mohmadi (IRI)	9
Carlos Muñoz (COL)	0
Nursultan Tursynov (KAZ)	10
Mohamed Metwally (EGY)	1
Qian Haitao (CHN)	1
Zhan Beleniuk (UKR)	7
Semen Novikov (BUL)	5
Turpal Bisultanov (DEN)	1
Lasha Gobadze (GEO)	2
Bachir Sid Azara (ALG)	1
Aleksandr Komarov (SRB)	10
Payton Jacobson (USA)	0
Rafig Huseynov (AZE)	2
Dávid Losonczi (HUN)	5

Quarterfinals
Arkadiusz Kułynycz (POL)	1
Alireza Mohmadi (IRI)	10
Nursultan Tursynov (KAZ)	3
Zhan Beleniuk (UKR)	7
Semen Novikov (BUL)	8
Lasha Gobadze (GEO)	3
Aleksandr Komarov (SRB)	2
Dávid Losonczi (HUN)	2

Semifinals
Alireza Mohmadi (IRI)	3
Zhan Beleniuk (UKR)	3
Semen Novikov (BUL)	3
Dávid Losonczi (HUN)	1

Final
Alireza Mohmadi (IRI)	0
Semen Novikov (BUL)	7

=== Repechage ===
Repechage
Carlos Muñoz (COL)	1
Arkadiusz Kułynycz (POL)	3
Turpal Bisultanov (DEN)	6
Lasha Gobadze (GEO)	0

Bronze medal matches
Arkadiusz Kułynycz (POL)	1
Zhan Beleniuk (UKR)	3
Turpal Bisultanov (DEN)	2
Dávid Losonczi (HUN)	1

== Final standing ==
Rank	Athlete
1st place, gold medalist(s)	Semen Novikov (BUL)
2nd place, silver medalist(s)	Alireza Mohmadi (IRI)
3rd place, bronze medalist(s)	Zhan Beleniuk (UKR)
3rd place, bronze medalist(s)	Turpal Bisultanov (DEN)
5	Arkadiusz Kułynycz (POL)
5	Dávid Losonczi (HUN)
7	Nursultan Tursynov (KAZ)
8	Aleksandr Komarov (SRB)
9	Lasha Gobadze (GEO)
10	Ali Cengiz (TUR)
11	Rafig Huseynov (AZE)
12	Bachir Sid Azara (ALG)
13	Qian Haitao (CHN)
14	Mohamed Metwally (EGY)
15	Carlos Muñoz (COL)
16	Payton Jacobson (USA)
