= Noureldin Hassan =

Egyptian wrestler (born 1998)

Personal information
- Full name: Noureldin Hany Mohamed Gomaa Hassan
- Born: 2 March 1998 (age 28)

Sport
- Country: Egypt
- Sport: Amateur wrestling
- Events: Freestyle; Greco-Roman
Medal record
Representing Egypt
Men's Greco-Roman wrestling
African Games
| Silver medal – second place | 2019 Rabat | 97 kg |
African Championships
| Bronze medal – third place | 2020 Algiers | 97 kg |
| Bronze medal – third place | 2022 El Jadida | 87 kg |
Mediterranean Games
| Bronze medal – third place | 2022 Oran | 87 kg |
Men's freestyle wrestling
African Championships
| Bronze medal – third place | 2022 El Jadida | 92 kg |

Noureldin Hany Mohamed Gomaa Hassan (born 2 March 1998) is an Egyptian wrestler competing in both freestyle and Greco-Roman wrestling. He won a silver medal at the African Games, a bronze medal at the Mediterranean Games and several bronze medals at the African Wrestling Championships.

== Career ==
He represented Egypt at the 2019 African Games held in Rabat, Morocco and he won the silver medal in the men's 97 kg event.

In 2020, he won the bronze medal in the men's 97 kg event at the African Wrestling Championships held in Algiers, Algeria.

He won one of the bronze medals in both the men's freestyle 92 kg event and the men's Greco-Roman 87 kg event at the 2022 African Wrestling Championships held in El Jadida, Morocco. He won one of the bronze medals in the men's 87 kg event at the 2022 Mediterranean Games held in Oran, Algeria.

== Achievements ==
| Year | Tournament | Location | Result | Event |
|---|---|---|---|---|
| 2019 | African Games | Rabat, Morocco | 2nd | Greco-Roman 97 kg |
| 2020 | African Wrestling Championships | Algiers, Algeria | 3rd | Greco-Roman 97 kg |
| 2022 | African Wrestling Championships | El Jadida, Morocco | 3rd | Greco-Roman 87 kg |
| 2022 | African Wrestling Championships | El Jadida, Morocco | 3rd | Freestyle 92 kg |
| 2022 | Mediterranean Games | Oran, Algeria | 3rd | Greco-Roman 87 kg |
