= 2022 European Wrestling Championships – Men's Greco-Roman 87 kg =

Wrestling competition

Men's Greco-Roman 87 kg at the 2022 European Wrestling Championships
- Venue: BOK Sports Hall
- Location: Budapest, Hungary
- Dates: 1-2 April
- Competitors: 16

Medalists
gold medal	Turpal Bisultanov	Denmark
silver medal	Nicu Ojog	Romania
bronze medal	Islam Abbasov	Azerbaijan
bronze medal	Robert Kobliashvili	Georgia

The Men's Greco-Roman 87 kg is a competition featured at the 2022 European Wrestling Championships, and was held in Budapest, Hungary on April 1 and 2.

== Results ==
Legend

- F — Won by fall

=== Main Bracket ===
1/8 finals
Zurabi Datunashvili (SRB)	1
Erik Szilvássy (HUN)	1
Matej Mandić (CRO)	4
Islam Abbasov (AZE)	4
Vitalii Andriiovych (UKR)	0
Yoan Dimitrov (BUL)	6
Nicu Ojog (ROU)	5
Metehan Başar (TUR)	5
Turpal Bisultanov (DEN)	9
Damian von Euw (SUI)	0
Robert Kobliashvili (GEO)	7
Raido Liitmäe (EST)	1
Ilias Pagkalidis (GRE)	0
Mirco Minguzzi (ITA)	9
Zakarias Berg (SWE)	8
Arkadiusz Kułynycz (POL)	2

Quarterfinals
Zurabi Datunashvili (SRB)	3
Islam Abbasov (AZE)	5
Yoan Dimitrov (BUL)	2
Nicu Ojog (ROU)	10
Turpal Bisultanov (DEN)	8
Robert Kobliashvili (GEO)	0
Mirco Minguzzi (ITA)	7
Zakarias Berg (SWE)	5

Semifinals
Islam Abbasov (AZE)	0
Nicu Ojog (ROU)	2^{F}
Turpal Bisultanov (DEN)	10
Mirco Minguzzi (ITA)	0

Final
Nicu Ojog (ROU)	0
Turpal Bisultanov (DEN)	8

=== Repechage ===
Repechage round 1
Metehan Başar (TUR)	1
Yoan Dimitrov (BUL)	3
Damian von Euw (SUI)	1
Robert Kobliashvili (GEO)	3

Bronze medal match
Yoan Dimitrov (BUL)	1
Islam Abbasov (AZE)	5
Robert Kobliashvili (GEO)	3
Mirco Minguzzi (ITA)	3

== Final standing ==
Rank	Athlete	UWW Points
1st place, gold medalist(s)	Turpal Bisultanov (DEN)	13000
2nd place, silver medalist(s)	Nicu Ojog (ROU)	11000
3rd place, bronze medalist(s)	Islam Abbasov (AZE)	9500
3rd place, bronze medalist(s)	Robert Kobliashvili (GEO)	9500
5	Yoan Dimitrov (BUL)	8000
5	Mirco Minguzzi (ITA)	8000
7	Zakarias Berg (SWE)	7400
8	Zurabi Datunashvili (SRB)	7000
9	Metehan Başar (TUR)	6500
10	Matej Mandić (CRO)	6100
11	Arkadiusz Kułynycz (POL)	4000
12	Erik Szilvássy (HUN)	3800
13	Raido Liitmäe (EST)	3600
14	Damian von Euw (SUI)	3400
15	Vitalii Andriiovych (UKR)	3200
16	Ilias Pagkalidis (GRE)	3100
