= 2022 U23 World Wrestling Championships – Men's Greco-Roman 87 kg =

Wrestling competitions

Men's Greco-Roman 87 kg at the 2022 U23 World Championships
- Venue: Pontevedra Municipal Sports Hall
- Dates: 17–18 October
- Competitors: 20 from 20 nations

Medalists
gold medal	István Takács	Hungary
silver medal	Gevorg Tadevosyan	Armenia
bronze medal	Szymon Szymonowicz	Poland
bronze medal	Marcel Sterkenburg	Netherlands

The men's Greco-Roman 87 kilograms is a competition featured at the 2022 U23 World Wrestling Championships, and was held in Pontevedra, Spain on 17 and 18 October 2022. The qualification rounds were held on 17 October while medal matches were held on the 2nd day of the competition. A total of 20 wrestlers competed in this event, limited to athletes whose body weight was less than 87 kilograms.

This Greco-Roman wrestling competition consists of a single-elimination tournament, with a repechage used to determine the winner of two bronze medals. The two finalists face off for gold and silver medals. Each wrestler who loses to one of the two finalists moves into the repechage, culminating in a pair of bronze medal matches featuring the semifinal losers each facing the remaining repechage opponent from their half of the bracket.

== Results ==
Legend

- F — Won by fall

=== Final ===
Final
István Takács (HUN)	7
Gevorg Tadevosyan (ARM)	4

=== Top half ===
Round of 32
Vitalii Andriiovych (UKR)	0
István Takács (HUN)	9
Szymon Szymonowicz (POL)	4
Satoki Mukai (JPN)	2

Round of 16
Filip Smetko (CRO)	4
Michial Foy (USA)	0
István Takács (HUN)	6
Beka Melelashvili (GEO)	0
Nikolaos Iosifidis (GRE)	1
Szymon Szymonowicz (POL)	9
Lacin Valiyev (AZE)	4
Andreas Välis (EST)	2

Quarterfinals
Filip Smetko (CRO)	1
István Takács (HUN)	3
Szymon Szymonowicz (POL)	8
Lacin Valiyev (AZE)	0

Semifinals
István Takács (HUN)	4
Szymon Szymonowicz (POL)	1

=== Bottom half ===
Round of 32
Christian Zemp (SUI)	1
Abolfazl Choubani (IRI)	3
Marcel Sterkenburg (NED)	8^{F}
Daniel Véliz (MEX)	0

Round of 16
Maksat Sailau (KAZ)	4^{F}
Sunil Kumar (IND)	0
Abolfazl Choubani (IRI)	4
Muhittin Sarıçiçek (TUR)	4
Zahari Zashev (BUL)	1
Marcel Sterkenburg (NED)	9
Gevorg Tadevosyan (ARM)	9
Azat Salidinov (KGZ)	0

Quarterfinals
Maksat Sailau (KAZ)	9^{F}
Abolfazl Choubani (IRI)	4
Marcel Sterkenburg (NED)	0
Gevorg Tadevosyan (ARM)	4

Semifinals
Maksat Sailau (KAZ)	4
Gevorg Tadevosyan (ARM)	6

== Repechage ==
Repechage round 1
Vitalii Andriiovych (UKR)	3
Beka Melelashvili (GEO)	5

Repechage round 2
Beka Melelashvili (GEO)	4
Filip Smetko (CRO)	4
Azat Salidinov (KGZ)	9
Marcel Sterkenburg (NED)	9

Bronze medals
Beka Melelashvili (GEO)	1
Szymon Szymonowicz (POL)	4
Marcel Sterkenburg (NED)	9
Maksat Sailau (KAZ)	1

== Final standing ==
Rank	Athlete
1st place, gold medalist(s)	István Takács (HUN)
2nd place, silver medalist(s)	Gevorg Tadevosyan (ARM)
3rd place, bronze medalist(s)	Szymon Szymonowicz (POL)
3rd place, bronze medalist(s)	Marcel Sterkenburg (NED)
5	Beka Melelashvili (GEO)
5	Maksat Sailau (KAZ)
7	Abolfazl Choubani (IRI)
8	Filip Smetko (CRO)
9	Lacin Valiyev (AZE)
10	Azat Salidinov (KGZ)
11	Muhittin Sarıçiçek (TUR)
12	Vitalii Andriiovych (UKR)
13	Satoki Mukai (JPN)
14	Andreas Välis (EST)
15	Christian Zemp (SUI)
16	Nikolaos Iosifidis (GRE)
17	Zahari Zashev (BUL)
18	Michial Foy (USA)
19	Sunil Kumar (IND)
20	Daniel Véliz (MEX)
