= 2025 European Wrestling Championships – Men's Greco-Roman 87 kg =

Wrestling competition

Men's Greco-Roman 87 kg at the 2025 European Wrestling Championships
- Venue: X-Bionic Sphere
- Location: Bratislava, Slovakia
- Dates: 11-12 April
- Competitors: 21

Medalists
gold medal	Dávid Losonczi	Hungary
silver medal	Semen Novikov	Bulgaria
bronze medal	Islam Abbasov	Azerbaijan
bronze medal	Aleksandr Komarov	Serbia

The men's Greco-Roman 87 kg is a competition featured at the 2025 European Wrestling Championships, and was held in Bratislava, Slovakia on April 11 and 12.

== Results ==
Legend

- F — Won by fall

=== Final ===
Final
Semen Novikov (BUL)	3
Dávid Losonczi (HUN)	4

=== Top half ===
Round of 32
Yaroslav Filchakov (UKR)	8
Gabriel Lupașco (MDA)	0
Norbert Sipka (SVK)	2
Damian von Euw (SUI)	10
Szymon Szymonowicz (POL)	0
Islam Abbasov (AZE)	4

Round of 16
Semen Novikov (BUL)	6
Karen Khachatryan (ARM)	3
Yaroslav Filchakov (UKR)	9
Ihar Yarashevich (UWW)	3
Exauce Mukubu (NOR)	4
Damian von Euw (SUI)	1
Islam Abbasov (AZE)	4
Marcel Sterkenburg (NED)	1

Quarterfinals
Semen Novikov (BUL)	5
Yaroslav Filchakov (UKR)	3
Exauce Mukubu (NOR)	1
Islam Abbasov (AZE)	3

Semifinals
Semen Novikov (BUL)	5
Islam Abbasov (AZE)	3

=== Bottom half ===
Round of 32
Milad Alirzaev (UWW)	7
Ivan Huklek (CRO)	1
Vladimeri Karchaidze (FRA)	0
Hannes Wagner (GER)	10

Round of 16
Aleksandr Komarov (SRB)	9
Muhittin Sarıçiçek (TUR)	0
Milad Alirzaev (UWW)	6
Achiko Bolkvadze (GEO)	3
Ilias Pagkalidis (GRE)	0
Hannes Wagner (GER)	9
Waltteri Latvala (FIN)	0
Dávid Losonczi (HUN)	5

Quarterfinals
Aleksandr Komarov (SRB)	4
Milad Alirzaev (UWW)	3
Hannes Wagner (GER)	1
Dávid Losonczi (HUN)	2

Semifinals
Aleksandr Komarov (SRB)	1
Dávid Losonczi (HUN)	5

=== Repechage ===
Repechage round 2
Karen Khachatryan (ARM)	1
Yaroslav Filchakov (UKR)	3
Waltteri Latvala (FIN)	0
Hannes Wagner (GER)	4

Bronze medal match
Yaroslav Filchakov (UKR)	1
Islam Abbasov (AZE)	2
Hannes Wagner (GER)	1
Aleksandr Komarov (SRB)	3

== Final standing ==
Rank	Athlete
1st place, gold medalist(s)	Dávid Losonczi (HUN)
2nd place, silver medalist(s)	Semen Novikov (BUL)
3rd place, bronze medalist(s)	Islam Abbasov (AZE)
3rd place, bronze medalist(s)	Aleksandr Komarov (SRB)
5	Yaroslav Filchakov (UKR)
5	Hannes Wagner (GER)
7	Milad Alirzaev (UWW)
8	Damian von Euw (SUI)
9	Exauce Mukubu (NOR)
10	Karen Khachatryan (ARM)
11	Achiko Bolkvadze (GEO)
12	Ihar Yarashevich (UWW)
13	Norbert Sipka (SVK)
14	Marcel Sterkenburg (NED)
15	Ivan Huklek (CRO)
16	Szymon Szymonowicz (POL)
17	Gabriel Lupașco (MDA)
18	Muhittin Sarıçiçek (TUR)
19	Ilias Pagkalidis (GRE)
20	Waltteri Latvala (FIN)
21	Vladimeri Karchaidze (FRA)
