= Semen Novikov =

Bulgarian Greco-Roman wrestler

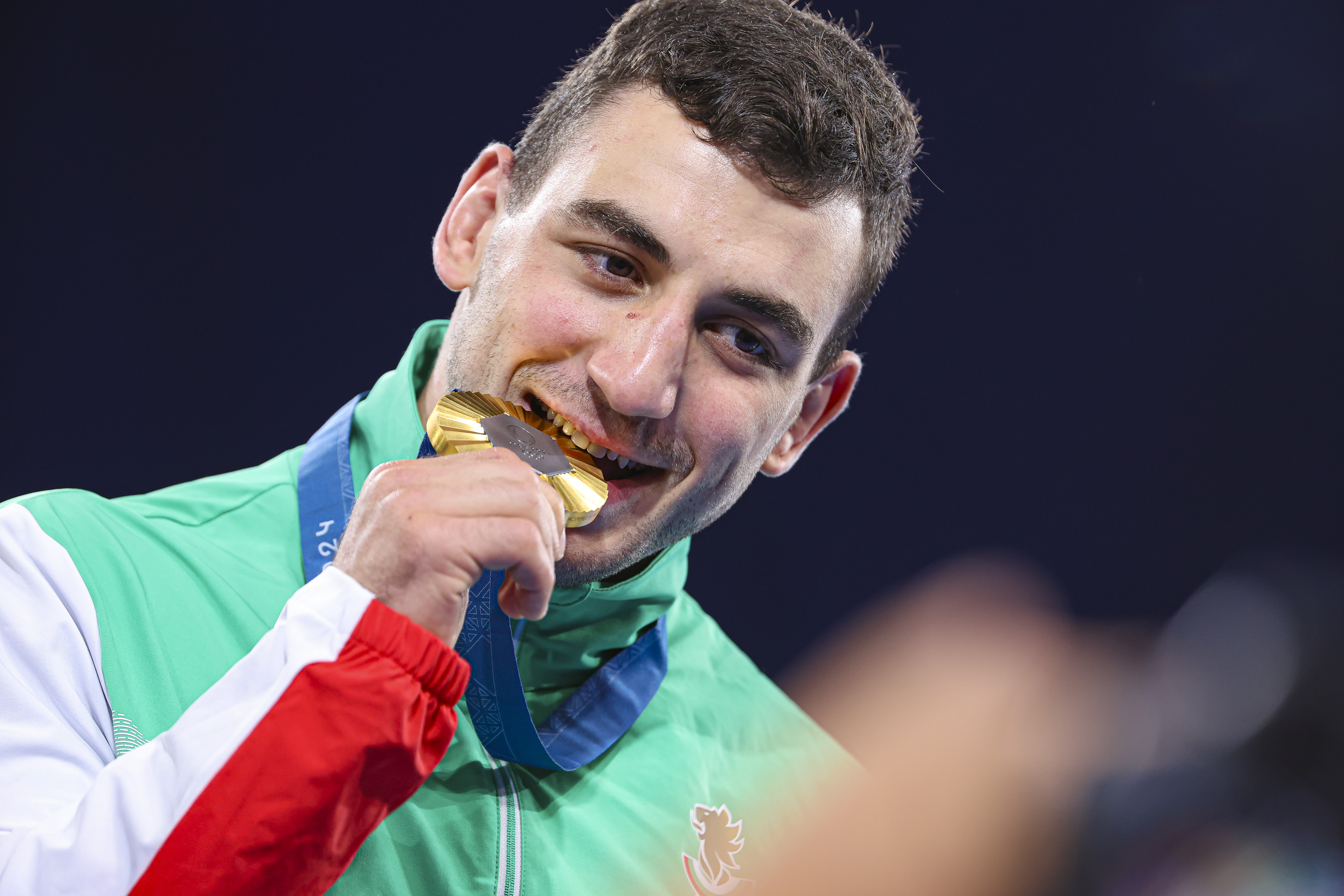
- Novikov in 2024

Personal information
- Born: 11 December 1997 (age 28) Kharkiv, Ukraine

Sport
- Country: Ukraine (2016–2021); Bulgaria (2023–present)
- Sport: Amateur wrestling
- Weight class: 87 kg
- Event: Greco-Roman
- Club: CSKA Sofia
Medal record
Men's Greco-Roman wrestling
Representing Bulgaria
Olympic Games
Gold medal – first place	2024 Paris	87 kg
World Championships
Gold medal – first place	2026 Astana	87 kg
Bronze medal – third place	2023 Belgrade	87 kg
European Championships
Silver medal – second place	2025 Bratislava	87 kg
Bronze medal – third place	2023 Zagreb	87 kg
Grand Prix
Gold medal – first place	2024 Budapest	87 kg
Silver medal – second place	2023 Budapest	87 kg
Dan Kolov - Nikola Petrov Tournament
Gold medal – first place	2023 Sofia	87 kg
Gold medal – first place	2024 Sofia	87 kg
Representing Ukraine
European Championships
Gold medal – first place	2020 Rome	87 kg
Individual World Cup
Bronze medal – third place	2020 Belgrade	87 kg
World U23 Championships
Gold medal – first place	2018 Bucharest	87 kg
Gold medal – first place	2019 Budapest	87 kg

Semen Sergeevich Novikov (Ukrainian: Семен Сергійович Новіков; born 11 December 1997 in Kharkiv) is a Ukrainian and Bulgarian Greco-Roman wrestler. He won the gold medal in Men's Greco-Roman 87 kg at the 2024 Summer Olympic Games.

He won the gold medal in the 87 kg event at the 2020 European Wrestling Championships held in Rome, Italy. He previously represented Ukraine.

== Career ==
In 2019, Novikov won the gold medal in the 87 kg event at the World U23 Wrestling Championship held in Budapest, Hungary. In 2020, he won one of the bronze medals in the 87 kg event at the Individual Wrestling World Cup held in Belgrade, Serbia.

In 2021, Novikov won the gold medal in his event at the Wladyslaw Pytlasinski Cup held in Warsaw, Poland.

He began representing Bulgaria in competitions in 2023. Novikov won the gold medal in his event at the 2023 Dan Kolov & Nikola Petrov Tournament held in Sofia, Bulgaria.

In final at the 2026 European Wrestling Championships in Tirana, Novikov get a silver medal. After defeated in the match for gold by Chechen-born Danish wrestler Turpal Bisultanov.

== Achievements ==
Year	Tournament	Venue	Result	Event
2020	European Championships	Rome, Italy	1st	Greco-Roman 87 kg
2023	European Championships	Zagreb, Croatia	3rd	Greco-Roman 87 kg
2023	World Championships	Belgrade, Serbia	3rd	Greco-Roman 87 kg
2024	Summer Olympic Games	Paris, France	1st	Greco-Roman 87 kg
2025	European Championships	Bratislava, Slovakia	2nd	Greco-Roman 87 kg
