= Aleksandr Komarov (wrestler) =

Russian Greco-Roman wrestler

Personal information
- Native name: Александр Комаров
- Full name: Aleksandr Andreyevich Komarov
- National team: Serbia
- Born: 5 May 1999 (age 27) Saint Petersburg, Leningrad Oblast, Russia
- Height: 180 cm (5 ft 11 in)
- Weight: 87 kg (192 lb)

Sport
- Country: Russia (2015–2021); Serbia (2024–present)
- Sport: Amateur wrestling
- Event: Greco-Roman
- Coached by: D. M. Gabidullin, A. P. Komarov
Medal record
Men's Greco-Roman wrestling
Representing Serbia
World Championships
| Gold medal – first place | 2025 Zagreb | 87 kg |
European Championships
| Gold medal – first place | 2024 Bucharest | 87 kg |
| Bronze medal – third place | 2025 Bratislava | 87 kg |
Grand Prix
| Bronze medal – third place | 2024 Zagreb | 87 kg |
Mediterranean Games
| Gold medal – first place | 2026 Taranto | 97 kg |
Representing Russia
European Championships
| Bronze medal – third place | 2019 Bucharest | 82 kg |
| Bronze medal – third place | 2020 Rome | 87 kg |
Dan Kolov & Nikola Petrov Tournament
| Gold medal – first place | 2019 Russe | 82 kg |
World U23 Championships
| Gold medal – first place | 2021 Belgrade | 87 kg |
World Juniors Championships
| Gold medal – first place | 2017 Tampere | 84 kg |
| Gold medal – first place | 2018 Trnava | 82 kg |
European Juniors Championships
| Gold medal – first place | 2017 Dortmund | 84 kg |
| Gold medal – first place | 2018 Rome | 82 kg |
World Cadets Championships
| Gold medal – first place | 2015 Sarajevo | 69 kg |
| Gold medal – first place | 2016 Tbilisi | 76 kg |
European Cadets Championships
| Gold medal – first place | 2015 Subotica | 69 kg |
| Gold medal – first place | 2016 Stockholm | 85 kg |

Aleksandr Andreyevich Komarov (Russian: Александр Андреевич Комаров, Serbian: Александар Андрејевич Комаров / Aleksandar Andrejevič Komarov; born 5 May 1999) is a Russian and Serbian Greco-Roman wrestler. He won the gold medal at the 2024 European Wrestling Championships and at the 2025 World Wrestling Championships.

== Wrestling career ==
Komarov is a two-time U20 Junior World Champion and two-time U17 Cadet World Champion. In European level, Komarov won four European junior titles. He won his first medal at the European Championships in 2019.

In 2021, Komarov won the gold medal in the 87 kg event at the 2021 U23 World Wrestling Championships held in Belgrade, Serbia.

Komarov won the gold medal in the 87 kg event at the 2024 European Wrestling Championships held in Bucharest, Romania. In the final, he defeated Ali Cengiz of Turkey. Komarov competed at the 2024 European Wrestling Olympic Qualification Tournament in Baku, Azerbaijan and he earned a quota place for Serbia for the 2024 Summer Olympics in Paris, France. He competed in the 87 kg event at the Olympics.

In 2025 he was awarded Sportman of The Year by the Serbian Olympic Committee.
