= Lasha Gobadze =

Georgian amateur wrestler

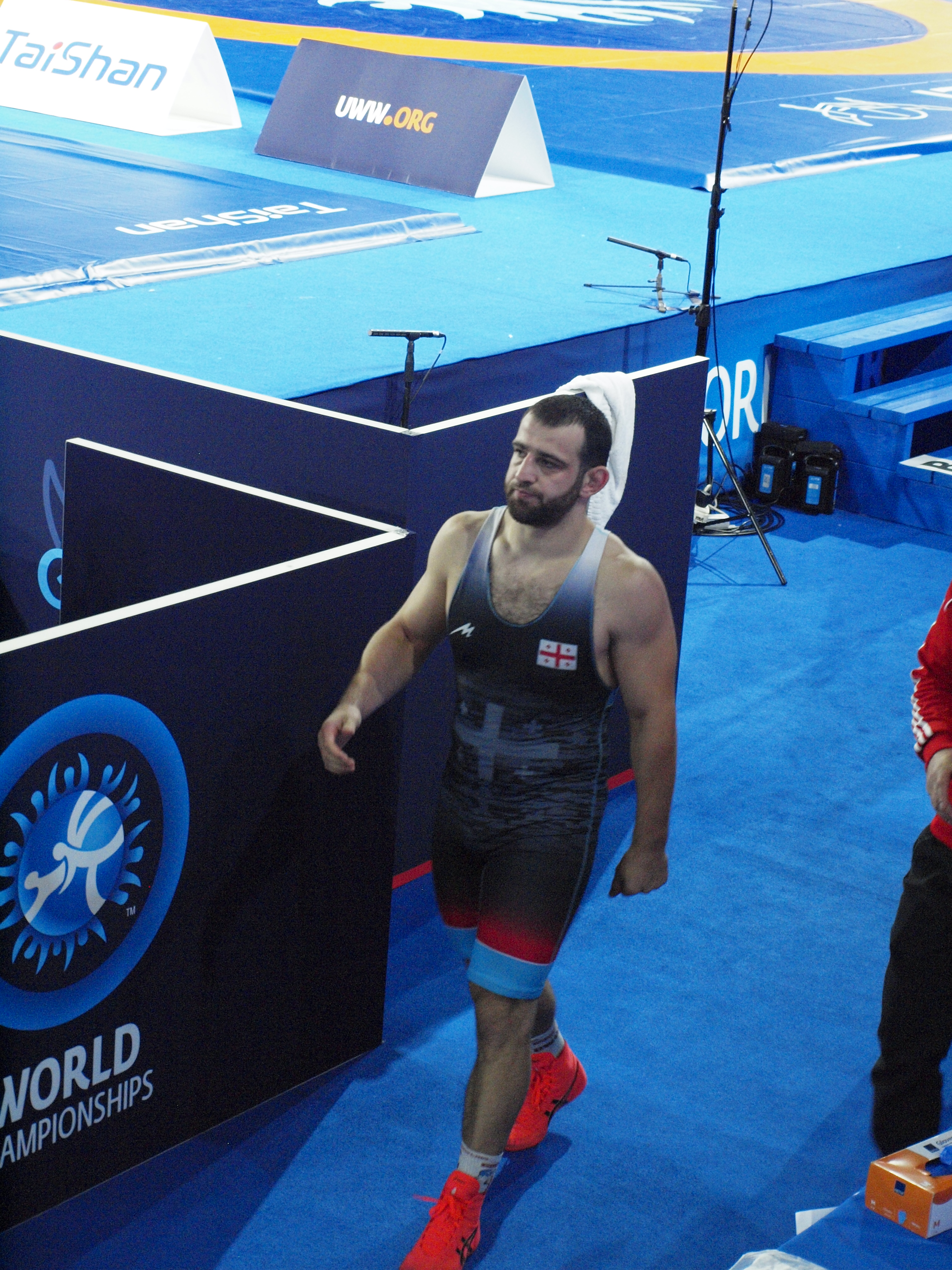
- Gobadze at the 2021 World Wrestling Championships in Oslo, Norway

Personal information
- Nationality: Georgian
- Born: 10 January 1994 (age 32) Khulo, Georgia
- Height: 1.73 m (5 ft 8 in)
- Weight: 86 kg (190 lb)

Sport
- Country: Georgia
- Sport: Wrestling
- Event: Greco-Roman
Medal record
Men's Greco-Roman wrestling
Representing Georgia
World Championships
Gold medal – first place	2019 Nur-Sultan	82 kg
Silver medal – second place	2021 Oslo	87 kg
Bronze medal – third place	2015 Las Vegas	80 kg
Bronze medal – third place	2026 Astana	87 kg
European Championships
Silver medal – second place	2019 Bucharest	82 kg
Bronze medal – third place	2023 Zagreb	87 kg
Vehbi Emre & Hamit Kaplan Tournament
Gold medal – first place	2016 Istanbul	80 kg
Gold medal – first place	2018 Istanbul	82 kg
Golden Grand Prix
Gold medal – first place	2015 Baku	80 kg
Grand Prix
Gold medal – first place	2015 Kermanshah	80 kg
Gold medal – first place	2018 Tbilisi	82 kg
Gold medal – first place	2021 Bucharest	87 kg
Gold medal – first place	2023 Alexandria	87 kg
Gold medal – first place	2025 Warsaw	87 kg
Silver medal – second place	2024 Nice	87 kg
Silver medal – second place	2025 Sassari	97 kg
Silver medal – second place	2026 Tirana	87 kg
Bronze medal – third place	2017 Tbilisi	80 kg
Bronze medal – third place	2017 Almaty	85 kg
Bronze medal – third place	2018 Minsk	87 kg
Bronze medal – third place	2019 Warsaw	87 kg
World U23 Championships
Silver medal – second place	2017 Bydgoszcz	80 kg
European U23 Championship
Gold medal – first place	2015 Walbrzych	80 kg
Gold medal – first place	2016 Ruse	80 kg
Bronze medal – third place	2017 Szombathely	85 kg
World Juniors Championships
Bronze medal – third place	2014 Zagreb	84 kg
European Juniors Championships
Bronze medal – third place	2013 Skopje	74 kg
Bronze medal – third place	2014 Katowice	84 kg
World Cadets Championships
Bronze medal – third place	2011 Szombathely	76 kg
European Cadets Championships
Silver medal – second place	2011 Warsaw	76 kg
Bronze medal – third place	2010 Sarajevo	76 kg

Lasha Gobadze (Georgian: ლაშა გობაძე , born 10 January 1994) is a Georgian sport wrestler who competes in the men's Greco Roman category and a current world champion in the men's 82 kg Greco Roman event. He claimed gold medal in the men's 82 kg event during the 2019 World Wrestling Championships. In March 2021, he qualified at the European Qualification Tournament to compete at the 2020 Summer Olympics in Tokyo, Japan. He competed in the 87 kg event.

He competed in the 87 kg event at the 2024 Summer Olympics in Paris, France.
