= Ali Cengiz =

Turkish Greco-Roman wrestler

Personal information
- Born: 8 April 1996 (age 30) Manisa, Turkey
- Height: 1.87 m (6 ft 2 in)
- Weight: 87 kg (192 lb)

Sport
- Country: Turkey
- Sport: Amateur wrestling
- Event: Greco-Roman
- Team: Ankara Aski Sport Club
Medal record
Men's Greco-Roman wrestling
Representing Turkey
World Championships
Gold medal – first place	2023 Belgrade	87 kg
Bronze medal – third place	2022 Belgrade	87 kg
European Championships
Silver medal – second place	2023 Zagreb	87 kg
Silver medal – second place	2024 Bucharest	87 kg
Mediterranean Games
Bronze medal – third place	2022 Oran	87 kg
Islamic Solidarity Games
Silver medal – second place	2017 Baku	85 kg
World Military Championships
Bronze medal – third place	2024 Yerevan	87 kg
Vehbi Emre & Hamit Kaplan Tournament
Silver medal – second place	2019 Istanbul	87 kg
Bronze medal – third place	2022 Istanbul	87 kg
Grand Prix
Silver medal – second place	2023 Alexandria	87 kg
Bronze medal – third place	2021 Zagreb	87 kg
Bronze medal – third place	2018 Dortmund	87 kg
Bronze medal – third place	2020 Rome	87 kg
Bronze medal – third place	2020 Warsaw	87 kg
World University Championship
Gold medal – first place	2018 Goiana	87 kg
European U23 Championship
Bronze medal – third place	2019 Novi Sad	87 kg
World Juniors Championships
Gold medal – first place	2015 Salvador da Bahia	84 kg
Silver medal – second place	2016 Macon	84 kg
European Juniors Championships
Silver medal – second place	2016 Bucharest	84 kg
Bronze medal – third place	2015 Istanbul	84 kg

Ali Cengiz (born 8 April 1996) is a Turkish wrestler competing in the 87 kg division of Greco-Roman wrestling. He won one of the bronze medals in the 87 kg event at the 2022 World Wrestling Championships held in Belgrade, Serbia. He is a member of the Ankara Aski Sport Club.

== Career ==
Ali Cengiz won a bronze medal at the 2019 FILA U-23 European Wrestling Championship held in Serbia, Novi Sad.

In 2022, he won one of the bronze medals in his event at the Vehbi Emre & Hamit Kaplan Tournament held in Istanbul, Turkey. He won one of the bronze medals in the 87 kg event at the 2022 Mediterranean Games held in Oran, Algeria.

In 2023, he won the silver medal at the 2023 European Wrestling Championships in Zagreb, Croatia, losing 5-2 to Hungarian István Takács in the final match of the 87 kg men's Greco-Roman style. In the second round, he advanced to the quarterfinals after his Dutch opponent Marcel Sterkenburg withdrew from the competition. In the quarterfinals, he drew 1-1 with Azerbaijan's Islam Abbasov and reached the semifinals with the advantage of the last point. In the semifinals, he defeated Georgian Lasha Gobadze 3-1 and reached the final. In June, Cengiz lost to Belorussian Kiryl Maskevich at Poddubny wrestling league 5 held in Vladikavkaz, Russia.

He won the silver medal in the 87 kg event at the 2024 European Wrestling Championships held in Bucharest, Romania. He competed in the 87 kg event at the 2024 Summer Olympics in Paris, France.

== Achievements ==
Year	Tournament	Location	Result	Event
2017	Islamic Solidarity Games	Baku, Azerbaijan	2nd	Greco-Roman 85 kg
2022	Mediterranean Games	Oran, Algeria	3rd	Greco-Roman 87 kg
2022	World Championships	Belgrade, Serbia	3rd	Greco-Roman 87 kg
2023	European Championships	Zagreb, Croatia	2nd	Greco-Roman 87 kg
2023	World Championships	Belgrade, Serbia	1st	Greco-Roman 87 kg
2024	European Championships	Bucharest, Romania	2nd	Greco-Roman 87 kg
