= Turpal Bisultanov =

Danish Greco-Roman wrestler

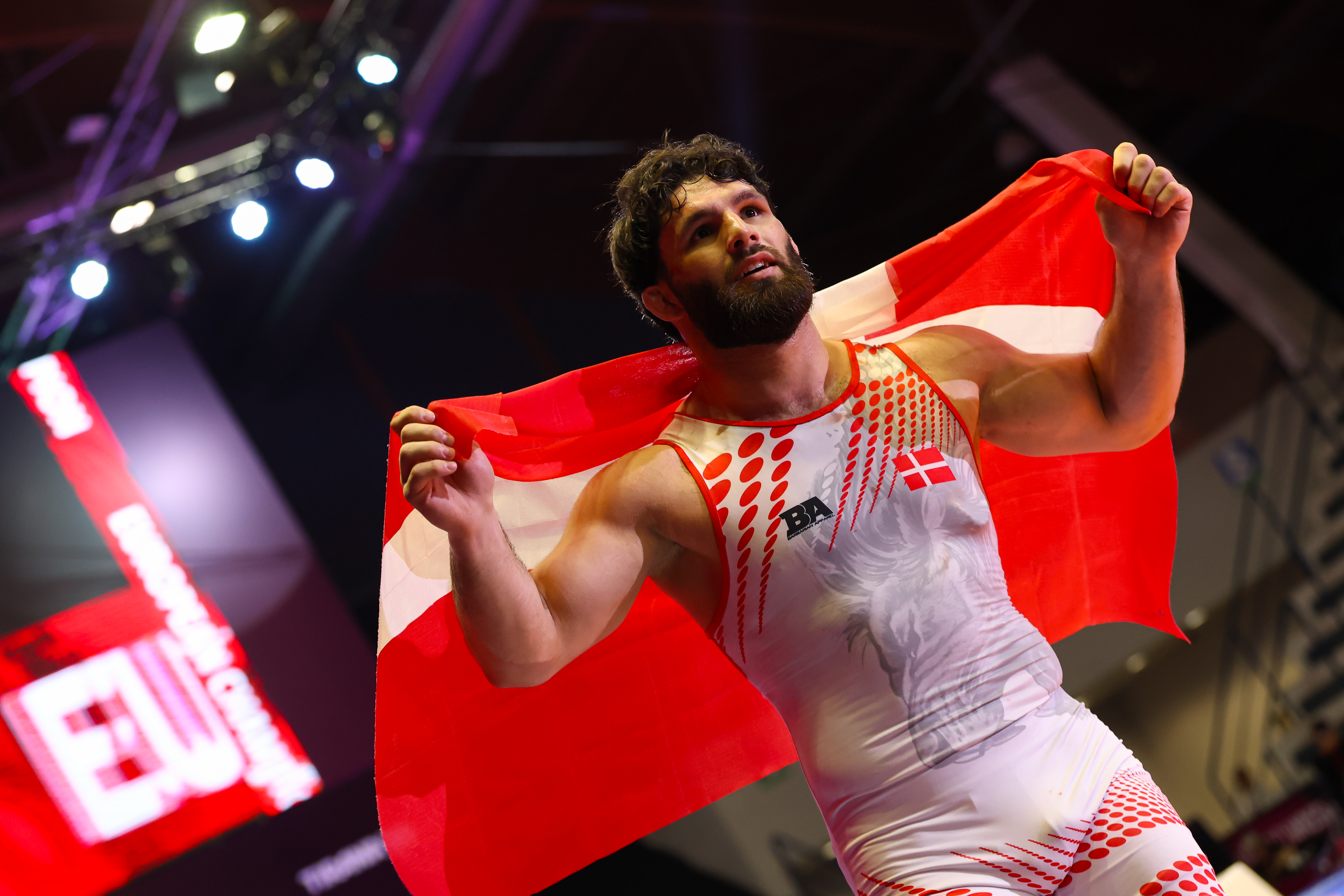
- Bisultanov at the 2026 Senior Wrestling European Championships

Personal information
- Full name: Turpal-Ali Alvievich Bisultanov
- Nationality: Russian; Danish
- Born: 14 October 2001 (age 24) Chechnya, Russia
- Home town: Copenhagen, Denmark
- Weight: 87 kg (192 lb)

Sport
- Country: Russia; Denmark
- Sport: Amateur wrestling
- Event: Greco-Roman
Medal record
Men's Greco-Roman wrestling
Representing Denmark
Olympic Games
Bronze medal – third place	2024 Paris	87 kg
World Championships
Gold medal – first place	2022 Belgrade	87 kg
Bronze medal – third place	2021 Oslo	87 kg
European Championships
Gold medal – first place	2022 Budapest	87 kg
European U23 Championship
Silver medal – second place	2022 Plovdiv	87 kg
Silver medal – second place	2023 Bucharest	87 kg
European Juniors Championships
Gold medal – first place	2021 Dortmund	87 kg

Turpal-Ali Alvievich Bisultanov (Russian: Турпал-Али Альвиевич Бисултанов; born 14 October 2001) is a Danish Greco-Roman wrestler.

== Career ==
He won the silver medal in the 87 kg event at the 2022 World Wrestling Championships held in Belgrade, Serbia. He won the gold medal in the men's 87 kg event at the 2022 European Wrestling Championships held in Budapest, Hungary. He also won the gold medal in the Greco-Roman style 87 kg at the 2021 European Juniors Wrestling Championships in Germany.

He won one of the bronze medals in the 87 kg event at the 2024 Summer Olympics in Paris, France. He defeated Dávid Losonczi of Hungary in his bronze medal match.

== Personal life ==
Bisultanov is the younger brother of Rajbek Bisultanov.
