= István Takács =

Hungarian Greco-Roman wrestler

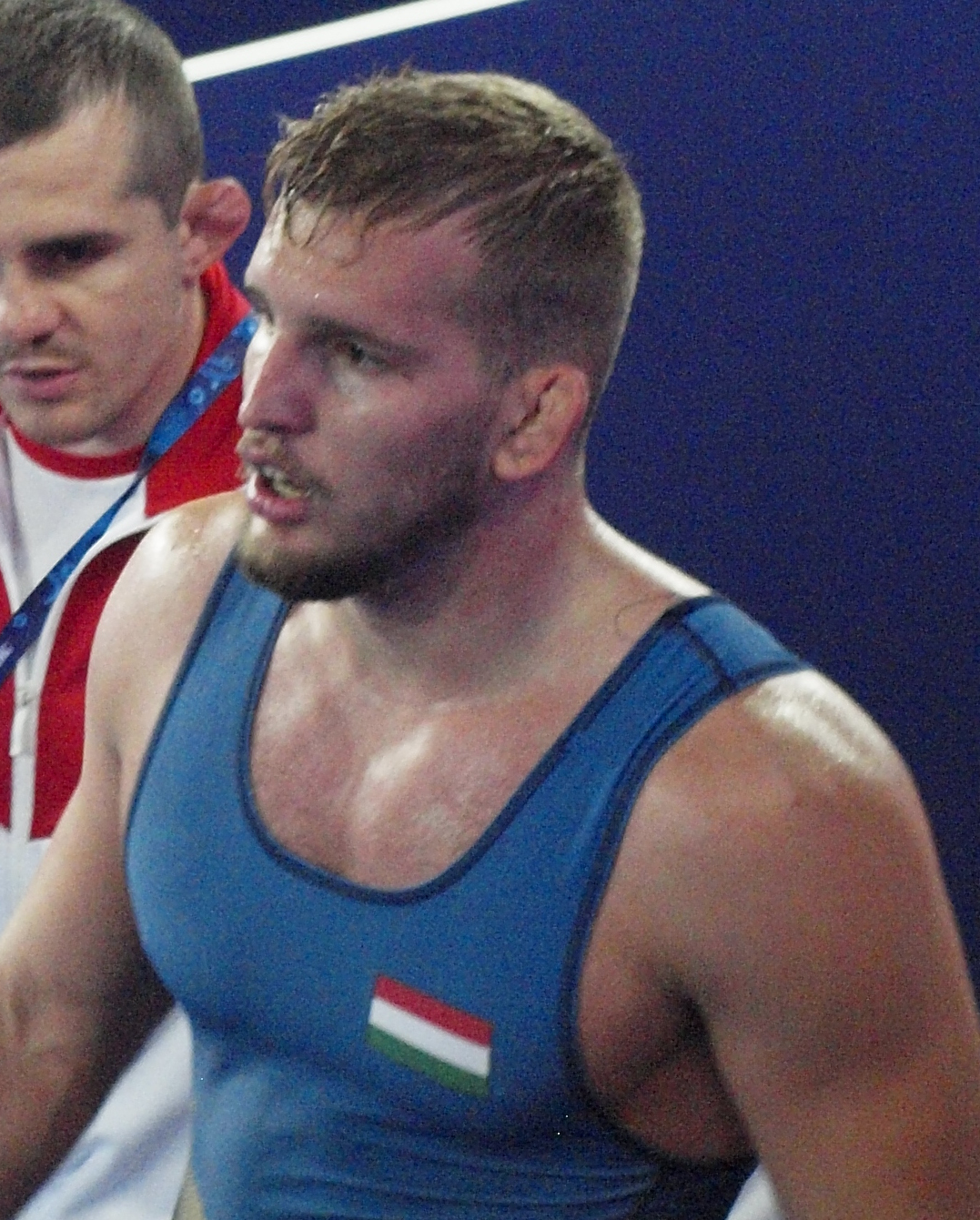
- Takács at the 2021 World Wrestling Championships in Oslo, Norway

Personal information
- Born: 23 November 2000 (age 25) Hungary

Sport
- Country: Hungary
- Sport: Amateur wrestling
- Weight class: 87 kg
- Event: Greco-Roman
Medal record
Men's Greco-Roman wrestling
Representing Hungary
European Championships
| Gold medal – first place | 2023 Zagreb | 87 kg |
Grand Prix
| Gold medal – first place | 2023 Zagreb | 87 kg |
| Gold medal – first place | 2026 Zagreb | 87 kg |
| Bronze medal – third place | 2022 Rome | 87 kg |
| Bronze medal – third place | 2026 Tirana | 87 kg |
Vehbi Emre & Hamit Kaplan Tournament
| Silver medal – second place | 2023 Istanbul | 87 kg |
| Bronze medal – third place | 2025 Kocaeli | 87 kg |
Dan Kolov - Nikola Petrov Tournament
| Bronze medal – third place | 2022 Veliko Tarnovo | 87 kg |
World U23 Championships
| Gold medal – first place | 2022 Pontevedra | 87 kg |
| Bronze medal – third place | 2023 Tirana | 87 kg |
European U23 Championship
| Gold medal – first place | 2022 Plovdiv | 87 kg |
| Bronze medal – third place | 2021 Skopje | 87 kg |
World Juniors Championships
| Gold medal – first place | 2019 Tallinn | 82 kg |
| Bronze medal – third place | 2018 Trnava | 82 kg |
European Juniors Championships
| Gold medal – first place | 2019 Pontevedra | 82 kg |

István Takács (born 23 November 2000) is a Hungarian Greco-Roman wrestler. He won the gold medal in the 87 kg event at the 2023 European Wrestling Championships held in Zagreb, Croatia.

== Career ==
He won the gold medal at the 2023 European Wrestling Championships in Zagreb, Croatia, by defeating Ali Cengiz 5–2 in the men's Greco-Roman style 87 kg final match. He had reached the final by defeating Serbian Žarko Dickov 3–1 in the first round, Romanian Nicu Ojog 7–1 in the second round, Semen Novikov competing for Bulgaria 3–2 in the quarterfinals and Swiss Damian von Euw 5–1 in the semifinals.

== Achievements ==
| Year | Tournament | Location | Result | Event |
|---|---|---|---|---|
| 2023 | European Championships | Zagreb, Croatia | 1st | Greco-Roman 87 kg |
