= Islam Abbasov =

Azerbaijani Greco-Roman wrestler

İslam Abbasov
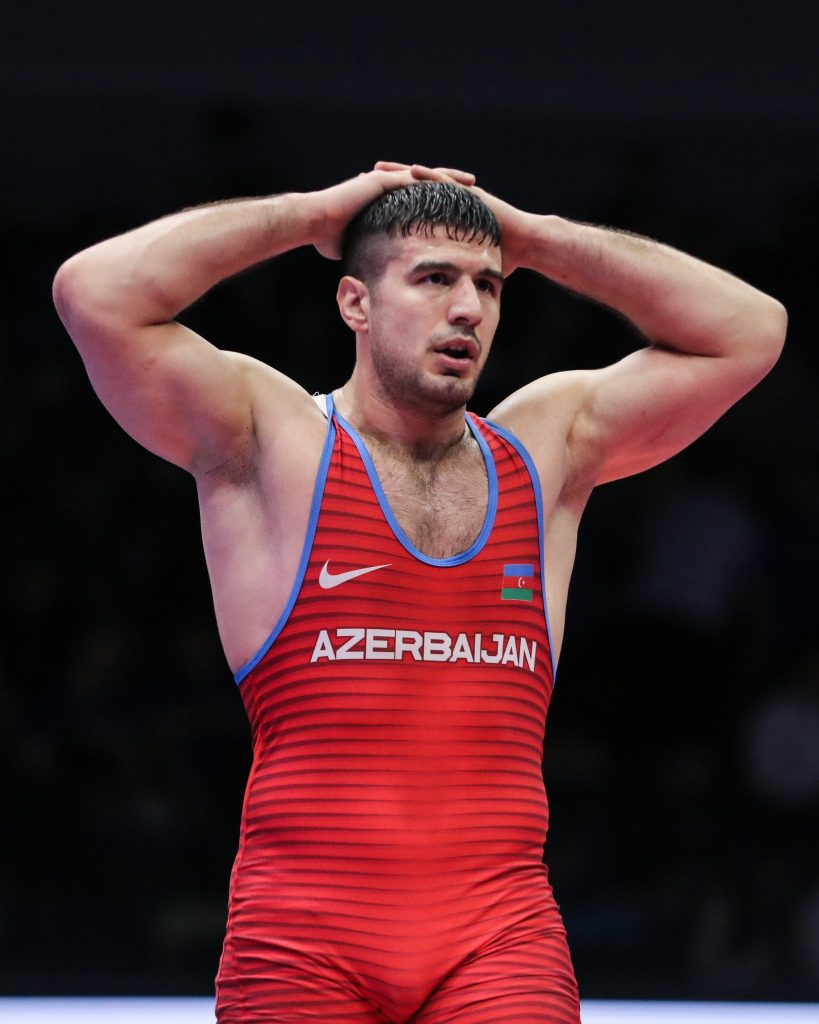
- Abbasov in 2024

Personal information
- Full name: İslam Əzim oğlu Abbasov
- Nationality: Azerbaijani
- Born: 24 March 1996 (age 30)
Medal record
Men's Greco-Roman wrestling
Representing Azerbaijan
European Games
| Silver medal – second place | 2019 Minsk | 87 kg |
European Championships
| Silver medal – second place | 2019 Bucharest | 87 kg |
| Bronze medal – third place | 2022 Budapest | 87 kg |
| Bronze medal – third place | 2020 Rome | 87 kg |
| Bronze medal – third place | 2025 Bratislava | 87 kg |
| Bronze medal – third place | 2026 Tirana | 87 kg |
Islamic Solidarity Games
| Gold medal – first place | 2017 Baku | 85 kg |
World Cup
| Gold medal – first place | 2015 Tehran | Team |
Grand Prix
| Gold medal – first place | 2022 Rome | 87 kg |

İslam Əzim oğlu Abbasov (born 24 March 1996) is an Azerbaijani Greco-Roman wrestler. In March 2021, he qualified at the European Qualification Tournament to compete at the 2020 Summer Olympics in Tokyo, Japan. In June 2021, he won one of the bronze medals in his event at the 2021 Wladyslaw Pytlasinski Cup held in Warsaw, Poland.

In 2022, he won the gold medal in his event at the Vehbi Emre & Hamit Kaplan Tournament held in Istanbul, Turkey. He won one of the bronze medals in the 87 kg event at the European Wrestling Championships held in Budapest, Hungary.

He competed at the 2024 European Wrestling Olympic Qualification Tournament in Baku, Azerbaijan hoping to qualify for the 2024 Summer Olympics in Paris, France. He was eliminated in his first match and he did not qualify for the Olympics.
