= 2020 European Wrestling Championships – Men's Greco-Roman 63 kg =

Wrestling competition

The men's Greco-Roman 63 kg is a competition featured at the 2020 European Wrestling Championships, and was held in Rome, Italy on February 10 and February 11.

== Medalists ==
Gold	Maksim Nehoda; Belarus
Silver	Ibragim Labazanov; Russia
Bronze	Erik Torba; Hungary
Bronze	Lenur Temirov; Ukraine

== Results ==
Legend

- F — Won by fall

1/8 finals
Mihai Mihuț (ROU)	11
Perica Dimitrijević (SRB)	2
Nikalas Sulev (BUL)	0
Rahman Bilici (TUR)	9
Ibragim Labazanov (RUS)	8
Taleh Mammadov (AZE)	0
Erik Torba (HUN)	10
Victor Ciobanu (MDA)	3
Justas Petravičius (LTU)	2
Stig-André Berge (NOR)	2
Sahak Hovhannisyan (ARM)	0
Levani Kavjaradze (GEO)	8
Maksim Nehoda (BLR)	10
Lenur Temirov (UKR)	0
Dawid Kareciński (POL)	9
Christos Theodorakis (GRE)	0

Quarterfinals
Mihai Mihuț (ROU)	7
Rahman Bilici (TUR)	4
Ibragim Labazanov (RUS)	10^{F}
Erik Torba (HUN)	6
Stig-André Berge (NOR)	7
Levani Kavjaradze (GEO)	2
Maksim Nehoda (BLR)	2
Dawid Kareciński (POL)	0

Semifinals
Mihai Mihuț (ROU)	1
Ibragim Labazanov (RUS)	5
Stig-André Berge (NOR)	1
Maksim Nehoda (BLR)	3

Final
Ibragim Labazanov (RUS)	8
Maksim Nehoda (BLR)	9

Repechage round 1
Taleh Mammadov (AZE)	3
Erik Torba (HUN)	9
Lenur Temirov (UKR)	5
Dawid Kareciński (POL)	1

Bronze medal match
Erik Torba (HUN)	6
Mihai Mihuț (ROU)	3
Lenur Temirov (UKR)	3
Stig-André Berge (NOR)	3

== Final standing ==
Rank	Athlete
1st place, gold medalist(s)	Maksim Nehoda (BLR)
2nd place, silver medalist(s)	Ibragim Labazanov (RUS)
3rd place, bronze medalist(s)	Erik Torba (HUN)
3rd place, bronze medalist(s)	Lenur Temirov (UKR)
5	Stig-André Berge (NOR)
5	Mihai Mihuț (ROU)
7	Rahman Bilici (TUR)
8	Levani Kavjaradze (GEO)
9	Dawid Kareciński (POL)
10	Victor Ciobanu (MDA)
11	Taleh Mammadov (AZE)
12	Justas Petravičius (LTU)
13	Perica Dimitrijević (SRB)
14	Sahak Hovhannisyan (ARM)
15	Nikalas Sulev (BUL)
16	Christos Theodorakis (GRE)
