= 2018 World Wrestling Championships – Men's Greco-Roman 63 kg =

Men's Greco-Roman 63 kg at the 2018 World Championships
- Venue: László Papp Budapest Sports Arena
- Dates: 25–26 October 2018
- Competitors: 27 from 27 nations

Medalists
gold medal	Stepan Maryanyan	Russia
silver medal	Elmurat Tasmuradov	Uzbekistan
bronze medal	Lenur Temirov	Ukraine
bronze medal	Rahman Bilici	Turkey

The men's Greco-Roman 63 kilograms is a competition featured at the 2018 World Wrestling Championships, and was held in Budapest, Hungary on 25 and 26 October.

This Greco-Roman wrestling competition consists of a single-elimination tournament, with a repechage used to determine the winner of two bronze medals. The two finalists face off for gold and silver medals. Each wrestler who loses to one of the two finalists moves into the repechage, culminating in a pair of bronze medal matches featuring the semifinal losers each facing the remaining repechage opponent from their half of the bracket.

== Results ==
Legend

- F — Won by fall
- R — Retired

=== Final ===
Final
Elmurat Tasmuradov (UZB)	3
Stepan Maryanyan (RUS)	6

=== Top half ===
Round of 32
Aidyn Nugumanov (KAZ)	1
Lenur Temirov (UKR)	11
Soslan Daurov (BLR)	2
Elmurat Tasmuradov (UZB)	2^{F}
Lin Yu-hung (TPE)	0
Tuo Erbatu (CHN)	11
Germán Díaz (PUR)	0
Mohsen Hajipour (IRI)	9
Donior Islamov (MDA)	8
Jesse Thielke (USA)	7

Round of 16
Urmatbek Amatov (KGZ)	9
Tamaš Nađ (SRB)	0
Nikolay Vichev (BUL)	1
Lenur Temirov (UKR)	9^{F}
Elmurat Tasmuradov (UZB)	7
Tuo Erbatu (CHN)	3
Mohsen Hajipour (IRI)	6
Donior Islamov (MDA)	7

Quarterfinals
Urmatbek Amatov (KGZ)	5
Lenur Temirov (UKR)	8
Elmurat Tasmuradov (UZB)	9
Donior Islamov (MDA)	0

Semifinals
Lenur Temirov (UKR)	3
Elmurat Tasmuradov (UZB)	4

=== Bottom half ===
Round of 32
István Váncza (HUN)	7^{F}
Fouad Fajari (MAR)	2
Katsuaki Endo (JPN)	0
Stepan Maryanyan (RUS)	8
Lasha Mariamidze (GEO)	0
Rahman Bilici (TUR)	9
Stig-André Berge (NOR)	1
Taleh Mammadov (AZE)	2
Jung Young-rok (KOR)	0^{R}
Slavik Galstyan (ARM)	5
Michał Tracz (POL)	7
Gaurav Sharma (IND)	3

Round of 16
Mihai Mihuț (ROU)	4
István Váncza (HUN)	10
Stepan Maryanyan (RUS)	9
Rahman Bilici (TUR)	0
Taleh Mammadov (AZE)	3
Slavik Galstyan (ARM)	1
Michał Tracz (POL)	1
Hassan Hassan Mohamed (EGY)	5

Quarterfinals
István Váncza (HUN)	0
Stepan Maryanyan (RUS)	8
Taleh Mammadov (AZE)	0
Hassan Hassan Mohamed (EGY)	3

Semifinals
Stepan Maryanyan (RUS)	7
Hassan Hassan Mohamed (EGY)	1

=== Repechage ===
Repechage round 1
Soslan Daurov (BLR)	0
Tuo Erbatu (CHN)	8
Katsuaki Endo (JPN)	5
Rahman Bilici (TUR)	7

Repechage round 2
Tuo Erbatu (CHN)	5
Donior Islamov (MDA)	0
Rahman Bilici (TUR)	9
István Váncza (HUN)	0

Bronze medals
Tuo Erbatu (CHN)	1
Lenur Temirov (UKR)	3
Rahman Bilici (TUR)	6
Hassan Hassan Mohamed (EGY)	1
