= 2021 World Wrestling Championships – Men's Greco-Roman 63 kg =

Wrestling competitions

Men's Greco-Roman 63 kg at the 2021 World Championships
- Venue: Nye Jordal Amfi
- Dates: 9–10 October 2021
- Competitors: 21 from 21 nations

Medalists
gold medal	Meisam Dalkhani	Iran
silver medal	Leri Abuladze	Georgia
bronze medal	Kensuke Shimizu	Japan
bronze medal	Lenur Temirov	Ukraine

The men's Greco-Roman 63 kilograms is a competition featured at the 2021 World Wrestling Championships, and was held in Oslo, Norway on 9 and 10 October.

This Greco-Roman wrestling competition consists of a single-elimination tournament, with a repechage used to determine the winner of two bronze medals. The two finalists face off for gold and silver medals. Each wrestler who loses to one of the two finalists moves into the repechage, culminating in a pair of bronze medal matches featuring the semifinal losers each facing the remaining repechage opponent from their half of the bracket.

== Results ==
Legend

- F — Won by fall

=== Final ===
Final
Leri Abuladze (GEO)	4
Meisam Dalkhani (IRI)	5

=== Top half ===
Round of 32

Round of 16
Sultan Assetuly (KAZ)	4
Leri Abuladze (GEO)	5
Kaly Sulaimanov (KGZ)	4
Kensuke Shimizu (JPN)	8
Mihai Mihuț (ROU)	9
Alexander Bica (SWE)	0
Erik Torba (HUN)	12
Mostafa Hassan Mohamed (EGY)	1

Quarterfinals
Leri Abuladze (GEO)	5
Kensuke Shimizu (JPN)	4
Mihai Mihuț (ROU)	5
Erik Torba (HUN)	6

Semifinals
Leri Abuladze (GEO)	7
Erik Torba (HUN)	1

=== Bottom half ===
Round of 32
Chung Han-jae (KOR)	9
Aleksandrs Jurkjans (LAT)	0
Neeraj Chhikara (IND)	0
Ibragim Labazanov (RWF)	8
Perica Dimitrijević (SRB)	0
Lenur Temirov (UKR)	9
Stig-André Berge (NOR)	3
Hrachya Poghosyan (ARM)	3
Deniz Menekse (GER)	3^{F}
Sammy Jones (USA)	3

Round of 16
Taleh Mammadov (AZE)	7
Mehmet Çeker (TUR)	1
Chung Han-jae (KOR)	7
Ibragim Labazanov (RWF)	5
Lenur Temirov (UKR)	3
Stig-André Berge (NOR)	1
Deniz Menekse (GER)	0
Meisam Dalkhani (IRI)	9

Quarterfinals
Taleh Mammadov (AZE)	6
Chung Han-jae (KOR)	2
Lenur Temirov (UKR)	3
Meisam Dalkhani (IRI)	3

Semifinals
Taleh Mammadov (AZE)	0
Meisam Dalkhani (IRI)	9

=== Repechage ===
Repechage round 2
Sultan Assetuly (KAZ)	1
Kensuke Shimizu (JPN)	4
Deniz Menekse (GER)	2
Lenur Temirov (UKR)	9

Bronze medals
Kensuke Shimizu (JPN)	10
Erik Torba (HUN)	1
Lenur Temirov (UKR)	5
Taleh Mammadov (AZE)	4

== Final standing ==
Rank	Athlete
1st place, gold medalist(s)	Meisam Dalkhani (IRI)
2nd place, silver medalist(s)	Leri Abuladze (GEO)
3rd place, bronze medalist(s)	Kensuke Shimizu (JPN)
3rd place, bronze medalist(s)	Lenur Temirov (UKR)
5	Erik Torba (HUN)
5	Taleh Mammadov (AZE)
7	Chung Han-jae (KOR)
8	Deniz Menekse (GER)
9	Mihai Mihuț (ROU)
10	Ibragim Labazanov (RWF)
11	Stig-André Berge (NOR)
12	Sultan Assetuly (KAZ)
13	Kaly Sulaimanov (KGZ)
14	Hrachya Poghosyan (ARM)
15	Mehmet Çeker (TUR)
16	Mostafa Hassan Mohamed (EGY)
17	Sammy Jones (USA)
18	Neeraj Chhikara (IND)
19	Alexander Bica (SWE)
20	Aleksandrs Jurkjans (LAT)
21	Perica Dimitrijević (SRB)
