= 2018 European Wrestling Championships – Men's Greco-Roman 63 kg =

The Men's Greco-Roman 63 kg is a competition featured at the 2018 European Wrestling Championships, and was held in Kaspiysk, Russia on April 30 and May 1.

== Medalists ==
Gold	Mihai Mihuț; Romania
Silver	Stig-André Berge; Norway
Bronze	Donior Islamov; Moldova
Bronze	Zaur Kabaloev; Russia

== Results ==
Legend

- F — Won by fall

=== Main Bracket ===
Round of 16
Dawid Ersetic (POL)	5
Máté Krasznai (HUN)	0
Stig-André Berge (NOR)	3
Ivan Lizatović (CRO)	2
Donior Islamov (MDA)	5
Rahman Bilici (TUR)	2
Rakhmatsikhudo Khaibarau (BLR)	1
Slavik Galstyan (ARM)	4^{F}
Dmytro Dobrev (UKR)	0
Nikolay Vichev (BUL)	12
Léo Tudezca (FRA)	0
Mihai Mihuț (ROU)	10
Levani Kavjaradze (GEO)	4
Taleh Mammadov (AZE)	0
Tamas Nad (SRB)	0
Zaur Kabaloev (RUS)	9

Quarterfinals
Dawid Ersetic (POL)	0
Stig-André Berge (NOR)	10
Donior Islamov (MDA)	6
Slavik Galstyan (ARM)	2
Nikolay Vichev (BUL)	0
Mihai Mihuț (ROU)	9
Levani Kavjaradze (GEO)	4
Zaur Kabaloev (RUS)	12

Semifinals
Stig-André Berge (NOR)	2
Donior Islamov (MDA)	1
Mihai Mihuț (ROU)	7
Zaur Kabaloev (RUS)	5

Final
Stig-André Berge (NOR)	2
Mihai Mihuț (ROU)	3

=== Repechage ===
Repechage round 1
Ivan Lizatović (CRO)	4
Dawid Ersetic (POL)	0
Léo Tudezca (FRA)	0
Nikolay Vichev (BUL)	9

Bronze medal match
Ivan Lizatović (CRO)	1
Donior Islamov (MDA)	2
Nikolay Vichev (BUL)	0
Zaur Kabaloev (RUS)	9
