= 2017 European Wrestling Championships – Men's Greco-Roman 59 kg =

The Men's Greco-Roman 59 kg is a competition featured at the 2017 European Wrestling Championships, and was held in Novi Sad, Serbia on May 6.

== Medalists ==
Gold	Kristijan Fris; Serbia
Silver	Ivo Angelov; Bulgaria
Bronze	Mingiyan Semenov; Russia
Bronze	Ivan Lizatović; Croatia

== Results ==
Legend

- F — Won by fall
- R — Retired

=== Top half ===
Qualification
Zhora Abovian (UKR)	1
Erik Torba (HUN)	2
Ivo Angelov (BUL)	3
Hammet Rüstem (TUR)	0^{R}
Taleh Mammadov (AZE)	3
Gevorg Gharibyan (ARM)	2
Donior Islamov (MDA)	0
Mingiyan Semenov (RUS)	9
Virgil Munteanu (ROU)	1
Ivan Lizatović (CRO)	2
Maksim Kazharski (BLR)	1
Leri Abuladze (GEO)	2
Przemysław Piątek (POL)	2
Christopher Kraemer (GER)	1
Joakim Fagerlund (SWE)	0
Kristijan Fris (SRB)	3

Quarterfinals
Erik Torba (HUN)	1
Ivo Angelov (BUL)	7
Taleh Mammadov (AZE)	0
Mingiyan Semenov (RUS)	3
Ivan Lizatović (CRO)	5
Leri Abuladze (GEO)	1
Przemysław Piątek (POL)	0
Kristijan Fris (SRB)	8

Semifinals
Ivo Angelov (BUL)	3
Mingiyan Semenov (RUS)	2
Ivan Lizatović (CRO)	1
Kristijan Fris (SRB)	2

Final
Ivo Angelov (BUL)	1
Kristijan Fris (SRB)	3

=== Repechage ===
Repechage round 2
Hammet Rüstem (TUR)	5
Erik Torba (HUN)	8
Joakim Fagerlund (SWE)	3
Przemysław Piątek (POL)	1

Bronze medals
Erik Torba (HUN)	0
Mingiyan Semenov (RUS)	5
Joakim Fagerlund (SWE)	1
Ivan Lizatović (CRO)	1
