= 2019 European Wrestling Championships – Men's Greco-Roman 63 kg =

The Men's Greco-Roman 63 kg is a competition featured at the 2019 European Wrestling Championships, and was held in Bucharest, Romania on April 12 and April 13.

== Medalists ==
Gold	Stepan Maryanyan; Russia
Silver	Stig-André Berge; Norway
Bronze	Levani Kavjaradze; Georgia
Bronze	Taleh Mammadov; Azerbaijan

== Results ==
Legend

- F — Won by fall

=== Main Bracket ===
1/8 finals
Michał Tracz (POL)	0
Stepan Maryanyan (RUS)	9
Justas Petravičius (LTU)	9
Enio Kertusha (ALB)	0
Taleh Mammadov (AZE)	8
Donior Islamov (MDA)	3
Mihai Mihuț (ROU)	4
Rahman Bilici (TUR)	3
Maksim Nehoda (BLR)	5
Nasrullakh Nasibov (UKR)	0
Slavik Galstyan (ARM)	2
Stig-André Berge (NOR)	3

Quarterfinals
Levani Kavjaradze (GEO)	10
Bence Kovács (HUN)	0
Stepan Maryanyan (RUS)	10
Justas Petravičius (LTU)	0
Taleh Mammadov (AZE)	8
Mihai Mihuț (ROU)	7
Maksim Nehoda (BLR)	1
Stig-André Berge (NOR)	4

Semifinals
Levani Kavjaradze (GEO)	3
Stepan Maryanyan (RUS)	11
Taleh Mammadov (AZE)	2
Stig-André Berge (NOR)	5

Final
Stepan Maryanyan (RUS)	9
Stig-André Berge (NOR)	0

=== Repechage ===
Repechage round 1
Michał Tracz (POL)	6
Justas Petravičius (LTU)	5
Slavik Galstyan (ARM)	9
Maksim Nehoda (BLR)	0

Bronze medal match
Michał Tracz (POL)	2
Levani Kavjaradze (GEO)	5
Slavik Galstyan (ARM)	2
Taleh Mammadov (AZE)	6
