= 2014 World Wrestling Championships – Men's Greco-Roman 59 kg =

Men's Greco-Roman 59 kg at the 2014 World Championships
- Venue: Gymnastics Sport Palace
- Dates: 14 September 2014
- Competitors: 36 from 36 nations

Medalists
gold medal	Hamid Sourian	Iran
silver medal	Mingiyan Semenov	Russia
bronze medal	Stig-André Berge	Norway
bronze medal	Elmurat Tasmuradov	Uzbekistan

The men's Greco-Roman 59 kilograms is a competition featured at the 2014 World Wrestling Championships, and was held in Tashkent, Uzbekistan on 14 September 2014.

== Results ==
Legend

- F — Won by fall

=== Finals ===
Semifinals		Final
Spenser Mango (USA)	1
Mingiyan Semenov (RUS)	9	Mingiyan Semenov (RUS)	1
Elmurat Tasmuradov (UZB)	1	Hamid Sourian (IRI)	2
Hamid Sourian (IRI)	2

=== Top half ===
==== Section 1 ====
Round of 64

Round of 32
Tobias Fonnesbek (DEN)	1
Péter Módos (HUN)	3
Fatih Üçüncü (TUR)	2
Spenser Mango (USA)	2
Andrey Tsaryuk (ISR)	0
Andrés Montaño (ECU)	8
Kazuma Kuramoto (JPN)	4
Ravinder Singh (IND)	1

Round of 16
Péter Módos (HUN)	0
Spenser Mango (USA)	4
Andrés Montaño (ECU)	2
Kazuma Kuramoto (JPN)	2

Quarterfinals
Spenser Mango (USA)	10
Kazuma Kuramoto (JPN)	0

==== Section 2 ====
Round of 64

Round of 32
Roman Amoyan (ARM)	0
Mingiyan Semenov (RUS)	3
Lee Jung-baik (KOR)	13
Jussi-Pekka Niemistö (FIN)	3
Stig-André Berge (NOR)	5
Manuel López (MEX)	0
Ivo Angelov (BUL)	9
Albert Baghumyan (ESP)	0

Round of 16
Mingiyan Semenov (RUS)	6^{F}
Lee Jung-baik (KOR)	0
Stig-André Berge (NOR)	1
Ivo Angelov (BUL)	1

Quarterfinals
Mingiyan Semenov (RUS)	5
Stig-André Berge (NOR)	0

=== Bottom half ===
==== Section 3 ====
Round of 64

Round of 32
Elmurat Tasmuradov (UZB)	8
Edward Barsegjan (POL)	0
Kristijan Fris (SRB)	4
Tonimir Sokol (CRO)	4
Maksim Kazharski (BLR)	2
Wang Lumin (CHN)	6
Arsen Eraliev (KGZ)	2
Ievgen Miagkyi (UKR)	1

Round of 16
Elmurat Tasmuradov (UZB)	9
Tonimir Sokol (CRO)	0
Wang Lumin (CHN)	12
Arsen Eraliev (KGZ)	3

Quarterfinals
Elmurat Tasmuradov (UZB)	9
Wang Lumin (CHN)	0

==== Section 4 ====
Round of 64
Ismael Borrero (CUB)	5
Yerbol Konyratov (KAZ)	0
Fouad Fajari (MAR)	0
Goderdzi Davitadze (GEO)	5
Haithem Mahmoud (EGY)	8
Suparmanto (INA)	0
Hamid Sourian (IRI)	8
Alex Anechitei (ROU)	0

Round of 32
Taleh Mammadov (AZE)	3
Yasin Özay (FRA)	2
Deniz Menekse (GER)	6^{F}
Victor Ciobanu (MDA)	2
Ismael Borrero (CUB)	7
Goderdzi Davitadze (GEO)	1
Haithem Mahmoud (EGY)	1
Hamid Sourian (IRI)	2

Round of 16
Taleh Mammadov (AZE)	6
Deniz Menekse (GER)	3
Ismael Borrero (CUB)	0
Hamid Sourian (IRI)	5

Quarterfinals
Taleh Mammadov (AZE)	0
Hamid Sourian (IRI)	3

=== Repechage ===
Repechage round 1
Alex Anechitei (ROU)	0
Haithem Mahmoud (EGY)	9

Repechage round 2
Roman Amoyan (ARM)	2
Lee Jung-baik (KOR)	4
Haithem Mahmoud (EGY)	9
Ismael Borrero (CUB)	13

Repechage round 3
Lee Jung-baik (KOR)	0
Stig-André Berge (NOR)	1
Ismael Borrero (CUB)	4
Taleh Mammadov (AZE)	2

Bronze medals
Stig-André Berge (NOR)	1
Spenser Mango (USA)	0
Ismael Borrero (CUB)	0
Elmurat Tasmuradov (UZB)	10
