= 2018 Grand Prix Zagreb Open =

- Host city: Zagreb, Croatia
- Dates: 3–4 February 2018
- Stadium: Dom Sportova

The 2018 Grand Prix Zagreb Open, was a wrestling event held in Zagreb, Croatia between 3–4 February 2018.

== Medal table ==
Rank	Nation	Gold	Silver	Bronze	Total
1	Belarus	2	3	1	6
2	Hungary	2	1	4	7
3	Romania	2	0	2	4
4	Turkey	1	3	2	6
5	Croatia	1	1	2	4
6	France	1	1	1	3
7	Serbia	1	0	2	3
8	Brazil	0	1	0	1
9	Russia	0	0	3	3
10	United States	0	0	1	1
Totals (10 entries)		10	10	18	38

== Team ranking ==
Rank	Men's Greco-Roman	
Rank	Team	Points
1	Turkey	136
2	Hungary	132
3	Belarus	114
4	Croatia	97
5	Romania	90
6	Serbia	87
7	Russia	55
8	France	50
9	United States	33
10	Czech Republic	22

== Greco-Roman ==
Event	Gold	Silver	Bronze
55 kg	Doğuş Ayazcı; Turkey	Marat Garipov; Brazil	Müslüm Alınlı; Turkey
55 kg	Doğuş Ayazcı; Turkey	Marat Garipov; Brazil	Krisztián Kecskeméti; Hungary
60 kg	Virgil Munteanu; Romania	Maksim Kazharski; Belarus	Xavier Johnson; United States
63 kg	Mihai Mihuț; Romania	Rahman Bilici; Turkey	Erik Torba; Hungary
67 kg	Yasin Özay; France	Mamadassa Sylla; France	Volkan Çakıl; Turkey
67 kg	Yasin Özay; France	Mamadassa Sylla; France	Pavel Saleev; Russia
72 kg	Aleksandar Maksimović; Serbia	Yunus Özel; Turkey	Istvan Kozak; Hungary
72 kg	Aleksandar Maksimović; Serbia	Yunus Özel; Turkey	Evrik Nikoghosyan; France
77 kg	Kazbek Kilou; Belarus	Dominik Etlinger; Croatia	Antonio Kamenjašević; Croatia
77 kg	Kazbek Kilou; Belarus	Dominik Etlinger; Croatia	Ruslan Vardanyan; Russia
82 kg	Božo Starčević; Croatia	Viktar Sasunouski; Belarus	Micu Ojog; Romania
82 kg	Božo Starčević; Croatia	Viktar Sasunouski; Belarus	László Szabó; Hungary
87 kg	Viktor Lőrincz; Hungary	Erik Szilvássy; Hungary	Ivan Huklek; Croatia
87 kg	Viktor Lőrincz; Hungary	Erik Szilvássy; Hungary	Ilia Nikiforov; Russia
97 kg	Adam Varga; Hungary	Siarhei Staradub; Belarus	Aleksander Hrabovik; Belarus
97 kg	Adam Varga; Hungary	Siarhei Staradub; Belarus	Mikheil Kajaia; Serbia
130 kg	Ioseb Chugoshvili; Belarus	Ramazan Sarı; Turkey	Alin Alexuc-Ciurariu; Romania
130 kg	Ioseb Chugoshvili; Belarus	Ramazan Sarı; Turkey	Boban Živanović; Serbia

== Participating nations ==
121 competitors from 16 nations participated.

- Argentina (3)
- Austria (4)
- Belarus (8)
- Brazil (1)
- Croatia (16)
- Czech Republic (6)
- France (5)
- Germany (2)
- Hungary (18)
- Puerto Rico (1)
- Romania (6)
- Russia (4)
- Serbia (15)
- Slovakia (3)
- Turkey (22)
- United States (7)
