= Namibia at the 2010 Summer Youth Olympics =

- IOC code: NAM
- NOC: Namibian National Olympic Committee

in Singapore
- Competitors: 6 in 5 sports
- Flag bearer: Abraham Louw

Summer Youth Olympics appearances
- 2010; 2014; 2018

Namibia competed at the 2010 Summer Youth Olympics, the inaugural Youth Olympic Games, held in Singapore from 14 August to 26 August 2010.

== Athletics ==
=== Girls ===
Track and Road Events

Athletes	Event	Qualification		Final	
Athletes	Event	Result	Rank	Result	Rank
Julia Handyene	Girls’ 1000m	3:04.29	17 Q	3:00.64	16
Ndapandula Nghinaunye	Girls’ 3000m	10:04.53	9 Q	10:08.62	8

== Gymnastics ==
=== Rhythmic Gymnastics ===
Individual

Athlete	Event	Qualification						Final					
Athlete	Event	Rope	Hoop	Ball	Clubs	Total	Rank	Rope	Hoop	Ball	Clubs	Total	Rank
Anica Profitt	Girls' Individual All-Around	18.600	19.150	16.450	18.900	73.100	18	Did not advance					

== Swimming ==
Athletes	Event	Heat		Semifinal		Final	
Athletes	Event	Time	Position	Time	Position	Time	Position
Quinton Delie	Boys’ 100m Freestyle	54.40	40	Did not advance			
Quinton Delie	Boys’ 200m Freestyle	1:59.83	39			Did not advance	

== Triathlon ==
Men's

Athlete	Event	Swim (1.5 km)	Trans 1	Bike (40 km)	Trans 2	Run (10 km)	Total	Rank
Abraham Louw	Individual	8:39	0:33	28:40	0:28	17:08	55:28.99	5

Mixed

Athlete	Event	Total Times per Athlete (Swim 250 m, Bike 7 km, Run 1.7 km)	Total Group Time	Rank
Sara Vilic (CRO); Abrahm Louw (NAM); Andrea Brown (ZIM); Wian Sullwald (RSA)	Mixed Team Relay; World Team 1	21:23; 19:07; 23:11; 19:56	1:23:37.79	9

== Wrestling ==
Greco-Roman

Athlete	Event	Pools		Final	Rank
Athlete	Event	Groups	Rank	Final	Rank
Jason Afrikaner	Boys' 58kg	Kranitz (HUN); W Fall (4–0)	2	3rd place match Suleymanov (RUS); L 0–2 (0–1, 0–3)	4
Jason Afrikaner	Boys' 58kg	Amatov (KGZ); L 0–2 (0–7, 0–3)	2	3rd place match Suleymanov (RUS); L 0–2 (0–1, 0–3)	4
