= 2020 Individual Wrestling World Cup – Men's Greco-Roman 63 kg =

The Men's Greco-Roman 63 kg is a competition featured at the 2020 Individual Wrestling World Cup, and was held in Belgrade, Serbia on 13 and 14 December 2020.

== Medalists ==
Gold	Zhambolat Lokyaev; Russia
Silver	Erik Torba; Hungary
Bronze	Soslan Daurov; Belarus
Bronze	Kaly Sulaimanov; Kyrgyzstan

== Results ==
Legend

- F — Won by fall
- WO — Won by walkover

1/8 finals
Soslan Daurov (BLR)	8
Mohammad Al-Ajmi (KUW)	0
Abdeldjebar Djebbari (ALG)	WO
Nikalas Sulev (BUL)
Perica Dimitrijević (SRB)	WO
~~Julinho Dju (POR)~~
Taleh Mammadov (AZE)	9
Oleksii Masyk (UKR)	1
Zhambolat Lokyaev (RUS)	8
Mateusz Szewczuk (POL)	0
Kaly Sulaimanov (KGZ)	2
Mihai Mihuț (ROU)	1
Abdurrahman Altan (TUR)	1
Gevorg Gharibyan (ARM)	3

Quarterfinals
Erik Torba (HUN)	8^{F}
Soslan Daurov (BLR)	5
Abdeldjebar Djebbari (ALG)	2
Perica Dimitrijević (SRB)	1
Taleh Mammadov (AZE)	0
Zhambolat Lokyaev (RUS)	2
Kaly Sulaimanov (KGZ)	4
Gevorg Gharibyan (ARM)	3

Semifinals
Erik Torba (HUN)	4
Abdeldjebar Djebbari (ALG)	1
Zhambolat Lokyaev (RUS)	6
Kaly Sulaimanov (KGZ)	0

Final
Erik Torba (HUN)	1
Zhambolat Lokyaev (RUS)	4

Repechage round 1
Mateusz Szewczuk (POL)	2
Taleh Mammadov (AZE)	10

Bronze medals
Soslan Daurov (BLR)	5
Abdeldjebar Djebbari (ALG)	1
Taleh Mammadov (AZE)	6
Kaly Sulaimanov (KGZ)	7
