= Kyrgyzstan at the 2010 Summer Youth Olympics =

- IOC code: KGZ
- NOC: Kyrgyzstan Olympic Committee
- Website: www.olympic.kg

in Singapore
- Competitors: 8 in 6 sports
- Flag bearer: Bolot Toktogonov
- Medals Ranked 47th: Gold 1 Silver 0 Bronze 2 Total 3

Summer Youth Olympics appearances (overview)
- 2010; 2014; 2018; 2026

Kyrgyzstan participated in the 2010 Summer Youth Olympics in Singapore.

== Medalists ==
Medal	Name	Sport	Event	Date
Gold	Urmatbek Amatov	Wrestling	Men's Greco-Roman 58kg	15 Aug
Bronze	Shadybek Sulaimanov	Wrestling	Men's Greco-Roman 50kg	15 Aug
Bronze	Bolot Toktogonov	Judo	Men's 100kg	23 Aug

== Boxing ==
Boys

Athlete	Event	Preliminaries	Semifinals	Final	Rank
Islomzhon Dalibaev	Welterweight (69kg)	Denis Radovan (GER); W 4-1	David Lourenco (BRA); L 1-2	3rd place Bout; Nursähet Pazzyýew (TKM); L 0-7	4

== Canoeing ==
Boys

Athlete	Event	Time Trial		Round 1	Round 2 (Rep)	Round 3	Round 4	Round 5	Final
Athlete	Event	Time	Rank	Round 1	Round 2 (Rep)	Round 3	Round 4	Round 5	Final
Ruslan Moltaev	Boys’ K1 Slalom	DSQ		Did not advance					
Ruslan Moltaev	Boys’ K1 Sprint	1:40.00	17	Jimenez (CUB); L 1:39.17-1:34.20	Martin (GBR); W 1:41.52-1:52.26	Did not advance			

== Judo ==
Individual

Athlete	Event	Round 1	Round 2	Round 3	Semifinals	Final	Rank
Athlete	Event	Opposition Result	Opposition Result	Opposition Result	Opposition Result	Opposition Result	Rank
Bolot Toktogonov	Boys' -100 kg	Nikiforov (BEL); L 000-021	Repechage; Vanoye (MEX); W 101-001		Repechage; Nasirpourdizaji (IRI); W 001-000	Bronze-medal match Mendoza (CUB); W 010-001	Bronze medal

Team

Team	Event	Round 1	Round 2	Semifinals	Final	Rank
Team	Event	Opposition Result	Opposition Result	Opposition Result	Opposition Result	Rank
Barcelona; Julia Rosso-Richetto (FRA); Subash Yadav (IND); Yu-Chun Wu (TPE); Maxamillian Schneider (USA); Natalia Rak (EST); Michael Greiter (AUT); Gulnoza Matniyazova (UZB); Bolot Toktogonov (KGZ)	Mixed Team	Osaka; L 3-5	Did not advance			9

== Modern pentathlon ==
Athlete	Event	Fencing (épée one touch)			Swimming (200m freestyle)			Running & Shooting (3000m, Laser Pistol)			Total points	Final rank
Athlete	Event	Results	Rank	Points	Time	Rank	Points	Time	Rank	Points	Total points	Final rank
Ilias Baktybekov	Boys' Individual	12-11	7	840	2:18.43	23	1140	12:27.13	22	2012	3992	19
Jihan El Midany (EGY); Ilias Baktybekov (KGZ)	Mixed Relay	46-46	11	820	2:07.74	16	1268	16:23.84	14	2148	4236	15

== Swimming ==
Athletes	Event	Heat		Semifinal		Final	
Athletes	Event	Time	Position	Time	Position	Time	Position
Dmitrii Aleksandrov	Boys’ 100m Breaststroke	1:05.81	19	Did not advance			
Dmitrii Aleksandrov	Boys’ 200m Breaststroke	2:20.52	10			Did not advance	
Ekaterina Lysenko	Girls’ 200m Breaststroke	3:01.50	20			Did not advance	

== Wrestling ==
Greco-Roman

Athlete	Event	Pools		Final	Rank
Athlete	Event	Groups	Rank	Final	Rank
Shadybek Sulaimanov	Boys' 50kg	Khaqqilov (UZB); L 0–2 (0–1, 0–3)	2	3rd place match Banguela (CUB); W 2–1 (0-1, 1–0, 3–0)	Bronze medal
Shadybek Sulaimanov	Boys' 50kg	Boughazi (ALG); W 2–0 (6–0, 1–0)	2	3rd place match Banguela (CUB); W 2–1 (0-1, 1–0, 3–0)	Bronze medal
Shadybek Sulaimanov	Boys' 50kg	Gundersen (NOR); W T. Fall (7–0, 6–0)	2	3rd place match Banguela (CUB); W 2–1 (0-1, 1–0, 3–0)	Bronze medal
Urmatbek Amatov	Boys' 58kg	Kranitz (HUN); W Fall (4–0)	1	Lytvynov (UKR); W Fall (2–0, 5–0)	Gold medal
Urmatbek Amatov	Boys' 58kg	Afrikaner (NAM); W 2–0 (7–0, 3–0)	1	Lytvynov (UKR); W Fall (2–0, 5–0)	Gold medal
