= Sari Ashig memorial =

Building in Azerbaijan

Monument of Sari Ashig
- Sarı Aşığın abidəsi

General information
- Status: Destroyed by the Armenian forces
- Location: Gulabird, Lachin, Azerbaijan
- Completed: 17th century
- Demolished: 1993

Monument of Sari Ashig was a monument and grave of the famous bayati master, Sari Ashig, located in the Lachin District.

The birth and death dates of Sari Ahiq from the 17th century Azerbaijani ashugs are unknown. He was born in Garadaghli village in the 17th–19th centuries on the right bank of the river Hakari, lived there, and was buried in the village of Gulabird near Garadaghli.

His imaginary appearance is engraved on the headstone of the grave. In 1927, archeologists conducted investigations in the Gulabird graveyard and the tomb, where the tomb of Sari Ashig was located, and concluded that the tombs belonged to the 17th century. "A good and the Ashig" epic was created among the people about the life of Sari Ashig. He is known mainly for his bayatis. He preferred this genre against those who said "bayati is women's business". He was also the author of many love poems, often used proverbs and saying them in his poems.

The grave of Sari Ahig was completely destroyed in 1993 by Armenians.
