= Nehoda =

Nehoda (Czech/Slovak feminine: Nehodová) or Negoda (Russian: Негода) is a surname of Slavic-language origin. It may refer to:

- Maksim Nehoda (born 1998), Belarusian wrestler
- Michal Nehoda (born 1976), Czech football forward
- Natalya Negoda (born 1963), Russian actress
- Zdeněk Nehoda (born 1952), Czech football forward
