= 2021 European Wrestling Championships – Men's Greco-Roman 63 kg =

Wrestling competition

The Men's Greco-Roman 63 kg is a competition featured at the 2021 European Wrestling Championships, and was held in Warsaw, Poland on April 23 and April 24. goh khorde

== Medalists ==
Gold	Zhambolat Lokyaev; Russia
Silver	Taleh Mammadov; Azerbaijan
Bronze	Aleksandrs Jurkjans; Latvia
Bronze	Leri Abuladze; Georgia

== Results ==
Legend

- F — Won by fall

Round of 16
Hrachya Poghosyan (ARM)	6
Soslan Daurov (BLR)	0
Taleh Mammadov (AZE)	9
Nikolay Vichev (BUL)	6
Andrea Setti (ITA)	3
Aleksandrs Jurkjans (LAT)	9
Erik Torba (HUN)	9
Yasin Özay (FRA)	1
Mihai Mihuț (ROU)	9
Mateusz Szewczuk (POL)	0
Oleksandr Hrushyn (UKR)	1
Zhambolat Lokyaev (RUS)	5
Perica Dimitrijević (SRB)	3
Andrej Ginc (GER)	5
Abdurrahman Altan (TUR)	2
Leri Abuladze (GEO)	4

Quarterfinals
Hrachya Poghosyan (ARM)	2
Taleh Mammadov (AZE)	2
Aleksandrs Jurkjans (LAT)	11
Erik Torba (HUN)	10
Mihai Mihuț (ROU)	2
Zhambolat Lokyaev (RUS)	3
Andrej Ginc (GER)	0
Leri Abuladze (GEO)	9

Semifinals
Taleh Mammadov (AZE)	7
Aleksandrs Jurkjans (LAT)	1
Zhambolat Lokyaev (RUS)	9
Leri Abuladze (GEO)	5

Final
Taleh Mammadov (AZE)	0
Zhambolat Lokyaev (RUS)	5

Repechage round 1
Nikolay Vichev (BUL)	1
Hrachya Poghosyan (ARM)	2
Oleksandr Hrushyn (UKR)	3
Mihai Mihuț (ROU)	5

Bronze medal match
Hrachya Poghosyan (ARM)	5
Aleksandrs Jurkjans (LAT)	7
Mihai Mihuț (ROU)	1
Leri Abuladze (GEO)	9

== Final standing ==
Rank	Athlete
1st place, gold medalist(s)	Zhambolat Lokyaev (RUS)
2nd place, silver medalist(s)	Taleh Mammadov (AZE)
3rd place, bronze medalist(s)	Aleksandrs Jurkjans (LAT)
3rd place, bronze medalist(s)	Leri Abuladze (GEO)
5	Hrachya Poghosyan (ARM)
5	Mihai Mihuț (ROU)
7	Erik Torba (HUN)
8	Andrej Ginc (GER)
9	Nikolay Vichev (BUL)
10	Oleksandr Hrushyn (UKR)
11	Perica Dimitrijević (SRB)
12	Andrea Setti (ITA)
13	Abdurrahman Altan (TUR)
14	Yasin Özay (FRA)
15	Soslan Daurov (BLR)
16	Mateusz Szewczuk (POL)
