= 2012 Vehbi Emre Tournament =

- Host city: Turkey, Istanbul
- Dates: 28–29 January 2012
- Stadium: Ahmet Comert Sports Complex

The Vehbi Emre Tournament 2012, was a wrestling event held in Istanbul, Turkey between 28 and 29 January 2012. This tournament was held as 32nd. It was held as the first of the ranking series Golden Grand Prix of 2012.

This international tournament includes competition men's Greco-Roman wrestling. This ranking tournament was held in honor of Turkish Wrestler and manager Vehbi Emre.

== Medal table ==
Rank	Nation	Gold	Silver	Bronze	Total
1	Russia	4	2	2	8
2	Turkey	2	0	0	2
3	Kazakhstan	1	1	1	3
4	Georgia	0	2	1	3
5	Iran	0	1	1	2
6	Ukraine	0	1	0	1
7	Azerbaijan	0	0	4	4
8	Belarus	0	0	2	2
8	Japan	0	0	2	2
10	Italy	0	0	1	1
Totals (10 entries)		7	7	14	28

== Greco-Roman ==
Event	Gold	Silver	Bronze
55 kg	Mingiyan Semenov; Russia	Ivan Tatarinov; Russia	Kohei Hasegawa; Japan
55 kg	Mingiyan Semenov; Russia	Ivan Tatarinov; Russia	Elcin Ali; Azerbaijan
60 kg	Ibragim Labazanov; Russia	Ruslan Israfilov; Ukraine	Ryūtarō Matsumoto; Japan
60 kg	Ibragim Labazanov; Russia	Ruslan Israfilov; Ukraine	Kamran Mammadov; Azerbaijan
66 kg	Refik Ayvazoğlu; Turkey	Mohammad Ali Esmaeil; Iran	Mikhail Semenov; Belarus
66 kg	Refik Ayvazoğlu; Turkey	Mohammad Ali Esmaeil; Iran	Vitaliy Rahimov; Azerbaijan
74 kg	Şeref Tüfenk; Turkey	Ilia Gulbatashvili; Georgia	Asset Adilov; Kazakhstan
74 kg	Şeref Tüfenk; Turkey	Ilia Gulbatashvili; Georgia	Bilan Nalgiev; Russia
84 kg	Azamat Bikbaev; Russia	Danyal Gajiev; Kazakhstan	Cavid Hamzatau; Belarus
84 kg	Azamat Bikbaev; Russia	Danyal Gajiev; Kazakhstan	Alan Khugaev; Russia
96 kg	Nikita Melnikov; Russia	Irakli Kajaia; Georgia	Daigoro Timoncini; Italy
96 kg	Nikita Melnikov; Russia	Irakli Kajaia; Georgia	Shalva Gadabadze; Azerbaijan
120 kg	Nurmakhan Tinaliyev; Kazakhstan	Aleksander Anuchin; Russia	Ioseb Chugoshvili; Georgia
120 kg	Nurmakhan Tinaliyev; Kazakhstan	Aleksander Anuchin; Russia	Amir Ghasemi Monjazi; Iran

== Participating nations ==
- Turkey
- Azerbaijan
- Belarus
- Russia
- Iran
- Uzbekistan
- Greece
- Georgia
- Serbia
- Kazakhstan
- Japan
- Ukraine
- Italy
