= 2022 World Wrestling Championships – Men's Greco-Roman 63 kg =

Wrestling competitions

Men's Greco-Roman 63 kg at the 2022 World Championships
- Venue: Štark Arena
- Dates: 11–12 September 2022
- Competitors: 30 from 29 nations

Medalists
gold medal	Sebastian Nađ	Serbia
silver medal	Leri Abuladze	Georgia
bronze medal	Tuo Erbatu	China
bronze medal	Taleh Mammadov	Azerbaijan

The men's Greco-Roman 63 kilograms is a competition featured at the 2022 World Wrestling Championships, and was held in Belgrade, Serbia on 11 and 12 September 2022.

This Greco-Roman wrestling competition consists of a single-elimination tournament, with a repechage used to determine the winner of two bronze medals. The two finalists face off for gold and silver medals. Each wrestler who loses to one of the two finalists moves into the repechage, culminating in a pair of bronze medal matches featuring the semifinal losers each facing the remaining repechage opponent from their half of the bracket.

== Results ==
Legend

- F — Won by fall

=== Final ===
Final
Leri Abuladze (GEO)	1
Sebastian Nađ (SRB)	3

=== Top half ===
Round of 32
Tuo Erbatu (CHN)	3
Alexander Bica (SWE)	0
Galym Kabdunassarov (KAZ)	0
Nikolay Vichev (BUL)	9
Cristóbal Torres (CHI)	0
Tynar Sharshenbekov (KGZ)	9
Ahmet Uyar (TUR)	0
Alireza Nejati (IRI)	5
José Rodríguez (MEX)	0
Abdolmohammad Papi (GER)	8
Emerson Felipe (GUA)	0
Aker Al-Obaidi (UWW)	8
Song Jin-seub (KOR)	3
Victor Ciobanu (MDA)	5

Round of 16
Leri Abuladze (GEO)	4
Tuo Erbatu (CHN)	1
Nikolay Vichev (BUL)	1
Tynar Sharshenbekov (KGZ)	6
Alireza Nejati (IRI)	7
Abdolmohammad Papi (GER)	4
Aker Al-Obaidi (UWW)	0
Victor Ciobanu (MDA)	9

Quarterfinals
Leri Abuladze (GEO)	7
Tynar Sharshenbekov (KGZ)	2
Alireza Nejati (IRI)	5
Victor Ciobanu (MDA)	3

Semifinals
Leri Abuladze (GEO)	2
Alireza Nejati (IRI)	1

=== Bottom half ===
Round of 32
Erik Torba (HUN)	2
Răzvan Arnăut (ROU)	4
Abdeldjebar Djebbari (ALG)	1
Sebastian Nađ (SRB)	7
Turabek Tirkashev (UZB)	1
Ivan Lizatović (CRO)	8
Ryuto Ikeda (JPN)	2
Hrachya Poghosyan (ARM)	5
Neeraj Chhikara (IND)	4
Sammy Jones (USA)	0
Luis Orta (CUB)	10
Oleksandr Hrushyn (UKR)	0
Aleksandrs Jurkjans (LAT)	6^{F}
Jordan Kabongo (COD)	0

Round of 16
Răzvan Arnăut (ROU)	1
Sebastian Nađ (SRB)	5
Ivan Lizatović (CRO)	1
Hrachya Poghosyan (ARM)	1
Neeraj Chhikara (IND)	0
Luis Orta (CUB)	9
Aleksandrs Jurkjans (LAT)	3
Taleh Mammadov (AZE)	7

Quarterfinals
Sebastian Nađ (SRB)	4
Hrachya Poghosyan (ARM)	0
Luis Orta (CUB)	1
Taleh Mammadov (AZE)	3

Semifinals
Sebastian Nađ (SRB)	5
Taleh Mammadov (AZE)	0

=== Repechage ===
Repechage round 1
Abdeldjebar Djebbari (ALG)	1
Răzvan Arnăut (ROU)	3

Repechage round 2
Tuo Erbatu (CHN)	6
Tynar Sharshenbekov (KGZ)	0
Răzvan Arnăut (ROU)	1
Hrachya Poghosyan (ARM)	9

Bronze medals
Tuo Erbatu (CHN)	4
Alireza Nejati (IRI)	1
Hrachya Poghosyan (ARM)	4
Taleh Mammadov (AZE)	10

== Final standing ==
Rank	Athlete
1st place, gold medalist(s)	Sebastian Nađ (SRB)
2nd place, silver medalist(s)	Leri Abuladze (GEO)
3rd place, bronze medalist(s)	Tuo Erbatu (CHN)
3rd place, bronze medalist(s)	Taleh Mammadov (AZE)
5	Alireza Nejati (IRI)
5	Hrachya Poghosyan (ARM)
7	Luis Orta (CUB)
8	Victor Ciobanu (MDA)
9	Tynar Sharshenbekov (KGZ)
10	Răzvan Arnăut (ROU)
11	Aleksandrs Jurkjans (LAT)
12	Abdolmohammad Papi (GER)
13	Nikolay Vichev (BUL)
14	Aker Al-Obaidi (UWW)
15	Ivan Lizatović (CRO)
16	Neeraj Chhikara (IND)
17	Abdeldjebar Djebbari (ALG)
18	Song Jin-seub (KOR)
19	Erik Torba (HUN)
20	Ryuto Ikeda (JPN)
21	Turabek Tirkashev (UZB)
22	Alexander Bica (SWE)
23	Sammy Jones (USA)
24	Ahmet Uyar (TUR)
25	Jordan Kabongo (COD)
26	José Rodríguez (MEX)
27	Emerson Felipe (GUA)
28	Galym Kabdunassarov (KAZ)
29	Cristóbal Torres (CHI)
30	Oleksandr Hrushyn (UKR)
