= 2023 World Wrestling Championships – Men's Greco-Roman 67 kg =

Wrestling competitions

Men's Greco-Roman 67 kg at the 2023 World Championships
- Venue: Štark Arena
- Dates: 23–24 September 2023
- Competitors: 41 from 38 nations

Medalists
gold medal	Luis Orta	Cuba
silver medal	Hasrat Jafarov	Azerbaijan
bronze medal	Mate Nemeš	Serbia
bronze medal	Mohammad Reza Geraei	Iran

The men's Greco-Roman 67 kilograms is a competition featured at the 2023 World Wrestling Championships, and was held in Belgrade, Serbia on 23 and 24 September 2023.

This Greco-Roman wrestling competition consists of a single-elimination tournament, with a repechage used to determine the winner of two bronze medals. The two finalists face off for gold and silver medals. Each wrestler who loses to one of the two finalists moves into the repechage, culminating in a pair of bronze medal matches featuring the semifinal losers each facing the remaining repechage opponent from their half of the bracket.

== Results ==
Legend

- C — Won by 3 cautions given to the opponent

=== Finals ===
Semifinals		Final
Amantur Ismailov (KGZ)	1
Luis Orta (CUB)	9	Luis Orta (CUB)	4
Slavik Galstyan (ARM)	3	Hasrat Jafarov (AZE)	3
Hasrat Jafarov (AZE)	5

=== Top half ===
==== Section 1 ====
Round of 64
Julián Horta (COL)	10
Nilton Soto (PER)	0
Almat Kebispayev (KAZ)	9
Aslan Visaitov (AIN)	0
Ishak Ghaiou (ALG)	1
Mamadassa Sylla (FRA)	3

Round of 32
Joni Khetsuriani (GEO)	7
Ivo Iliev (BUL)	0
Aliaksandr Liavonchyk (AIN)	3
Julián Horta (COL)	1
Almat Kebispayev (KAZ)	9
Mamadassa Sylla (FRA)	10
Kristupas Šleiva (LTU)	0
Amantur Ismailov (KGZ)	10

Round of 16
Joni Khetsuriani (GEO)	5
Aliaksandr Liavonchyk (AIN)	1
Mamadassa Sylla (FRA)	0
Amantur Ismailov (KGZ)	8

Quarterfinals
Joni Khetsuriani (GEO)	0
Amantur Ismailov (KGZ)	10

==== Section 2 ====
Round of 64
Mateusz Bernatek (POL)	1
Souleymen Nasr (TUN)	3
Mansur Nurberdiýew (TKM)	3
Vinayak Patil (UWW)	5

Round of 32
Mihai Mihuț (ROU)	4
Andrés Montaño (ECU)	0
Luis Orta (CUB)	8
Souleymen Nasr (TUN)	0
Vinayak Patil (UWW)	8
Witalis Lazovski (GER)	2
Kwon Min-seong (KOR)	2
Mate Nemeš (SRB)	6

Round of 16
Mihai Mihuț (ROU)	0
Luis Orta (CUB)	8
Vinayak Patil (UWW)	1
Mate Nemeš (SRB)	5

Quarterfinals
Luis Orta (CUB)	3
Mate Nemeš (SRB)	2

=== Bottom half ===
==== Section 3 ====
Round of 64
Valentin Petic (MDA)	6
Andreas Vetsch (SUI)	1
Slavik Galstyan (ARM)	8
Ignazio Sanfilippo (ITA)	0

Round of 32
Husiyuetu (CHN)	5
Morten Thoresen (NOR)	0
Alejandro Sancho (USA)	5
Valentin Petic (MDA)	1
Slavik Galstyan (ARM)	8
Mohamed Ibrahim El-Sayed (EGY)	7
Parviz Nasibov (UKR)	1
Murat Fırat (TUR)	8

Round of 16
Husiyuetu (CHN)	1
Alejandro Sancho (USA)	3
Slavik Galstyan (ARM)	10
Murat Fırat (TUR)	0

Quarterfinals
Alejandro Sancho (USA)	0
Slavik Galstyan (ARM)	9

==== Section 4 ====
Round of 64
Firuz Mirzoradzhabov (TJK)	3
Niklas Öhlén (SWE)	5
István Váncza (HUN)	6
Néstor Almanza (CHI)	0

Round of 32
Mohammad Reza Geraei (IRI)	6
Abror Atabaev (UZB)	3
Kyotaro Sogabe (JPN)	9
Niklas Öhlén (SWE)	0
István Váncza (HUN)	8
Shon Nadorgin (ISR)	0
Edson Olmos (MEX)	0
Hasrat Jafarov (AZE)	8

Round of 16
Mohammad Reza Geraei (IRI)	11
Kyotaro Sogabe (JPN)	10
István Váncza (HUN)	1
Hasrat Jafarov (AZE)	5

Quarterfinals
Mohammad Reza Geraei (IRI)	0
Hasrat Jafarov (AZE)	10

=== Repechage ===
Repechage round 2
Souleymen Nasr (TUN)	3
Mihai Mihuț (ROU)	7
Edson Olmos (MEX)	0
István Váncza (HUN)	9

Repechage round 3
Mihai Mihuț (ROU)	0
Mate Nemeš (SRB)	6
István Váncza (HUN)	5
Mohammad Reza Geraei (IRI)	6

Bronze medals
Mate Nemeš (SRB)	3
Amantur Ismailov (KGZ)	3
Mohammad Reza Geraei (IRI)	8^{C}
Slavik Galstyan (ARM)	0

Olympic wrestle-off
Amantur Ismailov (KGZ)	0
Slavik Galstyan (ARM)	8

== Final standing ==
Rank	Athlete
1st place, gold medalist(s)	Luis Orta (CUB)
2nd place, silver medalist(s)	Hasrat Jafarov (AZE)
3rd place, bronze medalist(s)	Mate Nemeš (SRB)
3rd place, bronze medalist(s)	Mohammad Reza Geraei (IRI)
5	Slavik Galstyan (ARM)
5	Amantur Ismailov (KGZ)
7	István Váncza (HUN)
8	Vinayak Patil (UWW)
9	Mamadassa Sylla (FRA)
10	Joni Khetsuriani (GEO)
11	Mihai Mihuț (ROU)
12	Alejandro Sancho (USA)
13	Kyotaro Sogabe (JPN)
14	Almat Kebispayev (KAZ)
15	Julián Horta (COL)
16	Valentin Petic (MDA)
17	Husiyuetu (CHN)
18	Souleymen Nasr (TUN)
19	Aliaksandr Liavonchyk (AIN)
20	Murat Fırat (TUR)
21	Niklas Öhlén (SWE)
22	Mohamed Ibrahim El-Sayed (EGY)
23	Mansur Nurberdiýew (TKM)
24	Firuz Mirzoradzhabov (TJK)
25	Abror Atabaev (UZB)
26	Kwon Min-seong (KOR)
27	Witalis Lazovski (GER)
28	Ishak Ghaiou (ALG)
29	Mateusz Bernatek (POL)
30	Andreas Vetsch (SUI)
31	Parviz Nasibov (UKR)
32	Andrés Montaño (ECU)
33	Morten Thoresen (NOR)
34	Néstor Almanza (CHI)
35	Ivo Iliev (BUL)
36	Ignazio Sanfilippo (ITA)
37	Shon Nadorgin (ISR)
38	Aslan Visaitov (AIN)
39	Nilton Soto (PER)
40	Kristupas Šleiva (LTU)
41	Edson Olmos (MEX)

Qualified for the 2024 Summer Olympics
