= Wrestling at the 2016 Summer Olympics – Men's Greco-Roman 59 kg =

Men's Greco-Roman 59 kg at the Games of the XXXI Olympiad
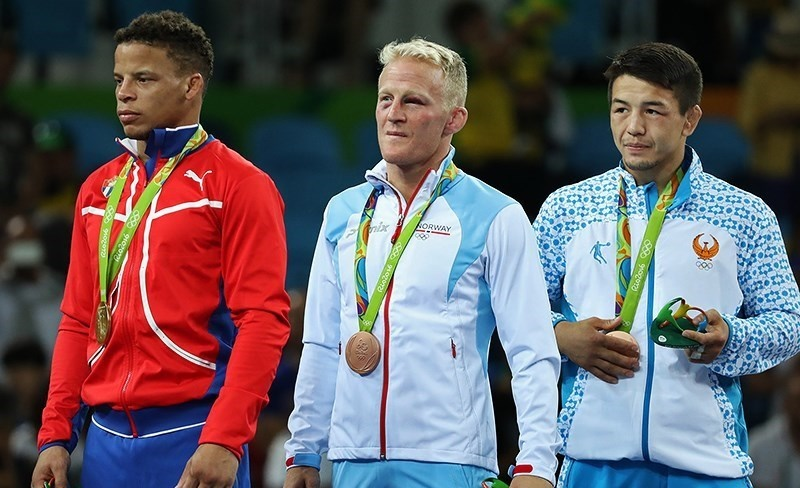
- Medalists
- Venue: Carioca Arena 2
- Date: 14 August 2016
- Competitors: 19 from 19 nations

Medalists
1st place, gold medalist(s)		Ismael Borrero	Cuba
2nd place, silver medalist(s)		Shinobu Ota	Japan
3rd place, bronze medalist(s)		Elmurat Tasmuradov	Uzbekistan
3rd place, bronze medalist(s)		Stig-André Berge	Norway

Men's Greco-Roman 59 kilograms competition at the 2016 Summer Olympics in Rio de Janeiro, Brazil, took place on August 14 at the Carioca Arena 2 in Barra da Tijuca.

This Greco-Roman wrestling competition consists of a single-elimination tournament, with a repechage used to determine the winner of two bronze medals. The two finalists face off for gold and silver medals. Each wrestler who loses to one of the two finalists moves into the repechage, culminating in a pair of bronze medal matches featuring the semifinal losers each facing the remaining repechage opponent from their half of the bracket.

The medals for the competition were presented by Nenad Lalović, IOC member, Serbia, and the gifts were presented by Namig Aliyev, United World Wrestling bureau member.

== Schedule ==
All times are Brasília Standard Time (UTC−03:00)

Date	Time	Event
14 August 2016	10:00	Qualification rounds
14 August 2016	16:00	Repechage
14 August 2016	17:00	Finals

== Results ==
Legend

- F — Won by fall

=== Final ===
Final
Ismael Borrero (CUB)	8
Shinobu Ota (JPN)	0

=== Top half ===
Qualifications

1/8 finals
Ismael Borrero (CUB)	6
Arsen Eraliev (KGZ)	3
Andrés Montaño (ECU)	0
Wang Lumin (CHN)	8
Yun Won-chol (PRK)	8
Haithem Mahmoud (EGY)	3
Elmurat Tasmuradov (UZB)	7
Kristijan Fris (SRB)	2

1/4 finals
Ismael Borrero (CUB)	8
Wang Lumin (CHN)	0
Yun Won-chol (PRK)	0
Elmurat Tasmuradov (UZB)	9

Semifinals
Ismael Borrero (CUB)	4
Elmurat Tasmuradov (UZB)	1

=== Bottom half ===
Qualifications
Stig-André Berge (NOR)	2
Lee Jung-baik (KOR)	0
Shinobu Ota (JPN)	5
Hamid Sourian (IRI)	4
Almat Kebispayev (KAZ)	4
Ibragim Labazanov (RUS)	0

1/8 finals
Rovshan Bayramov (AZE)	8
Raiber Rodríguez (VEN)	0
Mehdi Messaoudi (MAR)	0
Jesse Thielke (USA)	8
Soslan Daurov (BLR)	0
Stig-André Berge (NOR)	3
Shinobu Ota (JPN)	6
Almat Kebispayev (KAZ)	0

1/4 finals
Rovshan Bayramov (AZE)	9
Jesse Thielke (USA)	0
Stig-André Berge (NOR)	0
Shinobu Ota (JPN)	4

Semifinals
Rovshan Bayramov (AZE)	2
Shinobu Ota (JPN)	4^{F}

=== Repechage ===
Repechage round 1
Hamid Sourian (IRI)	7
Almat Kebispayev (KAZ)	6^{F}

Repechage round 2
Arsen Eraliev (KGZ)	4
Wang Lumin (CHN)	2
Almat Kebispayev (KAZ)	0
Stig-André Berge (NOR)	2

Bronze medals
Arsen Eraliev (KGZ)	8
Elmurat Tasmuradov (UZB)	13
Stig-André Berge (NOR)	1
Rovshan Bayramov (AZE)	1

== Final standing ==
Rank	Athlete
1st place, gold medalist(s)	Ismael Borrero (CUB)
2nd place, silver medalist(s)	Shinobu Ota (JPN)
3rd place, bronze medalist(s)	Elmurat Tasmuradov (UZB)
3rd place, bronze medalist(s)	Stig-André Berge (NOR)
5	Arsen Eraliev (KGZ)
5	Rovshan Bayramov (AZE)
7	Almat Kebispayev (KAZ)
8	Wang Lumin (CHN)
9	Jesse Thielke (USA)
10	Yun Won-chol (PRK)
11	Hamid Sourian (IRI)
12	Haithem Mahmoud (EGY)
13	Kristijan Fris (SRB)
14	Lee Jung-baik (KOR)
15	Soslan Daurov (BLR)
16	Ibragim Labazanov (RUS)
17	Mehdi Messaoudi (MAR)
17	Andrés Montaño (ECU)
17	Raiber Rodríguez (VEN)
