= 2021 European Wrestling Championships – Men's Greco-Roman 67 kg =

Wrestling competition

The Men's Greco-Roman 67 kg is a competition featured at the 2021 European Wrestling Championships, and was held in Warsaw, Poland on April 24 and April 25.

== Medalists ==
| Gold | Mate Nemeš; Serbia |
| Silver | Mateusz Bernatek; Poland |
| Bronze | Slavik Galstyan; Armenia |
| Bronze | Murat Fırat; Turkey |

== Results ==
Legend

- F — Won by fall
- WO — Won by walkover

=== Final ===
| Final |
| Mateusz Bernatek (POL) | 2 |
| Mate Nemeš (SRB) | 7 |

=== Top half ===
Round of 32

Round of 16
Edgaras Venckaitis (LTU) | 6^{F}
Ivo Iliev (BUL) | 1
Slavik Galstyan (ARM) | 9
Oleksii Masyk (UKR) | 0
Joni Khetsuriani (GEO) | 1
Artem Surkov (RUS) | 3
Mateusz Bernatek (POL) | 3
Donior Islamov (MDA) | 1

Quarterfinals
Edgaras Venckaitis (LTU) | 0
Slavik Galstyan (ARM) | 9
Artem Surkov (RUS)
Mateusz Bernatek (POL) | WO

Semifinals
Slavik Galstyan (ARM) | 4
Mateusz Bernatek (POL) | 5

=== Bottom half ===
Round of 32
Andreas Vetsch (SUI) | 1
Maksim Nehoda (BLR) | 9
Fredrik Bjerrehuus (DEN) | 9
Máté Krasznai (HUN) | 0

Round of 16
Namaz Rustamov (AZE) | 0
Mate Nemeš (SRB) | 6
Stefan Clément (FRA) | 3
Zaur Kabaloev (ITA) | 5
Witalis Lazovski (GER) | 1
Murat Fırat (TUR) | 5
Maksim Nehoda (BLR) | 0
Fredrik Bjerrehuus (DEN) | 8

Quarterfinals
Mate Nemeš (SRB) | 9
Zaur Kabaloev (ITA) | 0
Murat Fırat (TUR) | 8^{F}
Fredrik Bjerrehuus (DEN) | 1

Semifinals
Mate Nemeš (SRB) | 3
Murat Fırat (TUR) | 3

=== Repechage ===
Repechage round 1
Donior Islamov (MDA) | WO
Artem Surkov (RUS)
Namaz Rustamov (AZE) | 2
Zaur Kabaloev (ITA) | 2

Bronze medal match
Donior Islamov (MDA) | 0
Slavik Galstyan (ARM) | 9
Zaur Kabaloev (ITA) | 1
Murat Fırat (TUR) | 3

== Final standing ==
| Rank | Athlete |
|---|---|
| 1st place, gold medalist(s) | Mate Nemeš (SRB) |
| 2nd place, silver medalist(s) | Mateusz Bernatek (POL) |
| 3rd place, bronze medalist(s) | Slavik Galstyan (ARM) |
| 3rd place, bronze medalist(s) | Murat Fırat (TUR) |
| 5 | Donior Islamov (MDA) |
| 5 | Zaur Kabaloev (ITA) |
| 7 | Fredrik Bjerrehuus (DEN) |
| 8 | Edgaras Venckaitis (LTU) |
| 9 | Maksim Nehoda (BLR) |
| 10 | Artem Surkov (RUS) |
| 11 | Stefan Clément (FRA) |
| 12 | Namaz Rustamov (AZE) |
| 13 | Joni Khetsuriani (GEO) |
| 14 | Witalis Lazovski (GER) |
| 15 | Andreas Vetsch (SUI) |
| 16 | Ivo Iliev (BUL) |
| 17 | Oleksii Masyk (UKR) |
| 18 | Máté Krasznai (HUN) |
