= Meisam Dalkhani =

Iranian Greco-Roman wrestler

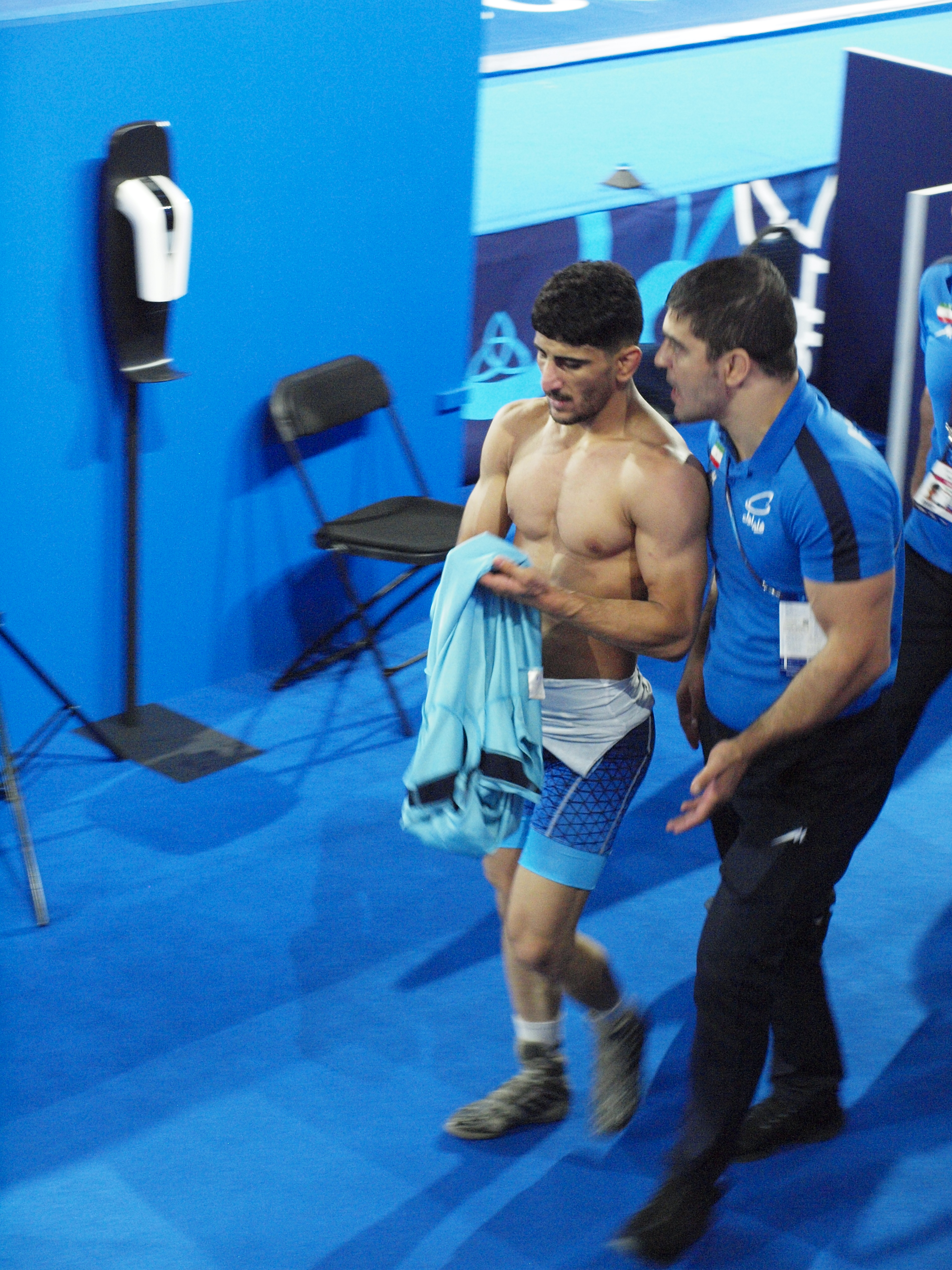

Personal information
- Native name: میثم دلخانی
- Nationality: Iranian
- Born: 5 January 1997 (age 29) Shiraz, Iran

Sport
- Country: Iran
- Sport: Greco-Roman wrestling
- Weight class: 63 kg
Medal record
Men's Greco-Roman wrestling
Representing Iran
World Championships
Gold medal – first place	2021 Oslo	63 kg
Asian Championships
Silver medal – second place	2021 Almaty	63 kg
Bronze medal – third place	2020 New Delhi	63 kg
Vehbi Emre & Hamit Kaplan Tournament
Silver medal – second place	2023 Istanbul	60 kg
Grand Prix
Bronze medal – third place	2024 Budapest	63 kg
Bronze medal – third place	2026 Zagreb	63 kg
World U23 Championships
Gold medal – first place	2019 Budapest	63 kg
Asian U23 Championship
Gold medal – first place	2019 Ulaanbaatar	63 kg
World Junior Championship
Bronze medal – third place	2016 Macon	55 kg
Asian Junior Championship
Bronze medal – third place	2015 Nay Pyi Taw	55 kg
Asian Junior Championship
Bronze medal – third place	2013 Ulaanbaatar	50 kg

Meisam Dalkhani (Persian: میثم دلخانی, born 5 January 1997 in Shiraz, Iran) is an Iranian Greco-Roman wrestler. He won gold medal in the 63 kg event at the 2021 World Wrestling Championships held in Oslo, Norway. In 2019, he won gold medal in the same event at the U23 World Wrestling Championships held in Budapest, Hungary.
