= Tuo Erbatu =

Chinese Greco-Roman wrestler

Personal information
- Born: 10 May 1993 (age 33)

Sport
- Country: China
- Sport: Amateur wrestling
- Weight class: 63 kg
- Event: Greco-Roman
Medal record
Men's Greco-Roman wrestling
Representing China
World Championships
Bronze medal – third place	2022 Belgrade	63 kg
Asian Championships
Gold medal – first place	2019 Xi'an	63 kg

Tuo Erbatu (born 10 May 1993) is a Chinese Greco-Roman wrestler. He won one of the bronze medals in the 63 kg event at the 2022 World Wrestling Championships held in Belgrade, Serbia. He won the gold medal the 63 kg event at the 2019 Asian Wrestling Championships held in Xi'an, China.

== Career ==
He lost his bronze medal match at the 2017 Asian Indoor and Martial Arts Games held in Ashgabat, Turkmenistan. In 2018, he competed at the Asian Wrestling Championships held in Bishkek, Kyrgyzstan. He lost his bronze medal match in the 63 kg event at the 2018 World Wrestling Championships held in Budapest, Hungary.

In 2019, he competed in the 63 kg event at the World Wrestling Championships held in Nur-Sultan, Kazakhstan. He was eliminated in his first match by eventual bronze medalist Almat Kebispayev of Kazakhstan.

== Achievements ==
Year	Tournament	Location	Result	Event
2019	Asian Championships	Xi'an, China	1st	Greco-Roman 63 kg
2022	World Championships	Belgrade, Serbia	3rd	Greco-Roman 63 kg
