= Lee Jung-baik =

South Korean Greco-Roman wrestler

- Hangul: 이정백
- RR: I Jeongbaek
- MR: I Chŏngbaek

Lee Jung-baik (Korean: 이정백; born August 27, 1986) is a South Korean Greco-Roman wrestler. He competed in the men's Greco-Roman 59 kg event at the 2016 Summer Olympics, in which he was eliminated in the round of 32 by Stig-André Berge.
