= Wrestling at the 2010 Summer Youth Olympics – Boys' Greco-Roman 58 kg =

The boys' 58 kg Greco-Roman tournament in wrestling at the 2010 Summer Youth Olympics was held on August 15 at the International Convention Centre.

The event limited competitors to a maximum of 58 kilograms of body mass. The tournament had two groups where wrestlers compete in a round-robin format. The winners of each group would go on to play for the gold medal, second placers played for the bronze medal while everyone else played for classification depending on where they ranked in the group stage.

== Medalists ==
| Gold | Silver | Bronze |
|---|---|---|
| Urmatbek Amatov; Kyrgyzstan | Olexandr Lytvynov; Ukraine | Artur Suleymanov; Russia |

== Group stages ==
=== Group A ===
| Athlete | Pld | C. Points | T. Points |
|---|---|---|---|
| Urmatbek Amatov (KGZ) | 2 | 7 | 14 |
| Jason Afrikaner (NAM) | 2 | 4 | 4 |
| Adrian Krantiz (HUN) | 2 | 0 | 0 |

| Adrian Kranitz (HUN) | Fall (0-4) | Urmatbek Amatov (KGZ) |
| Adrian Kranitz (HUN) | Fall (0-4) | Jason Afrikaner (NAM) |
| Urmatbek Amatov (KGZ) | 2-0 (7–0, 3–0) | Jason Afrikaner (NAM) |

=== Group B ===
| Athlete | Pld | C. Points | T. Points |
|---|---|---|---|
| Olexandr Lytvynov (UKR) | 3 | 9 | 11 |
| Artur Suleymanov (RUS) | 3 | 8 | 25 |
| Pedro Ramirez Camarillo (MEX) | 3 | 5 | 15 |
| Leonard Gregory (RSA) | 3 | 2 | 8 |

| Olexandr Lytvynov (UKR) | 2-1 (0-7, 1–0, 1–0) | Artur Suleymanov (RUS) |
| Leonard Gregory (RSA) | 1-2 (0-6, 3–1, 0-3) | Pedro Ramirez Camarillo (MEX) |
| Olexandr Lytvynov (UKR) | 2-1 (2–0, 3-4, 2–1) | Leonard Gregory (RSA) |
| Artur Suleymanov (RUS) | 2-0 (4–1, 1–0) | Pedro Ramirez Camarillo (MEX) |
| Olexandr Lytvynov (UKR) | 2-1 (0-2, 1–1, 1–1) | Pedro Ramirez Camarillo (MEX) |
| Artur Suleymanov (RUS) | Fall (6–0, 5–0) | Leonard Gregory (RSA) |

== Classification ==
=== 5th-place match ===
| Adrian Kranitz (HUN) | 1-2 (0-1, 5–1, 4-7) | Pedro Ramirez Camarillo (MEX) |

=== Bronze-medal match ===
| Jason Afrikaner (NAM) | 0-2 (0-1, 0-3) | Artur Suleymanov (RUS) |

=== Gold-medal match ===
| Urmatbek Amatov (KGZ) | Fall (2–0, 5–0) | Olexandr Lytvynov (UKR) |

== Final rankings ==
| Rank | Athlete |
|---|---|
| Gold medal | Urmatbek Amatov (KGZ) |
| Silver medal | Olexandr Lytvynov (UKR) |
| Bronze medal | Artur Suleymanov (RUS) |
| 4 | Jason Afrikaner (NAM) |
| 5 | Pedro Ramirez Camarillo (MEX) |
| 6 | Adrian Kranitz (HUN) |
| 7 | Leonard Gregory (RSA) |
