= Lenur Temirov =

Ukrainian Greco-Roman wrestler

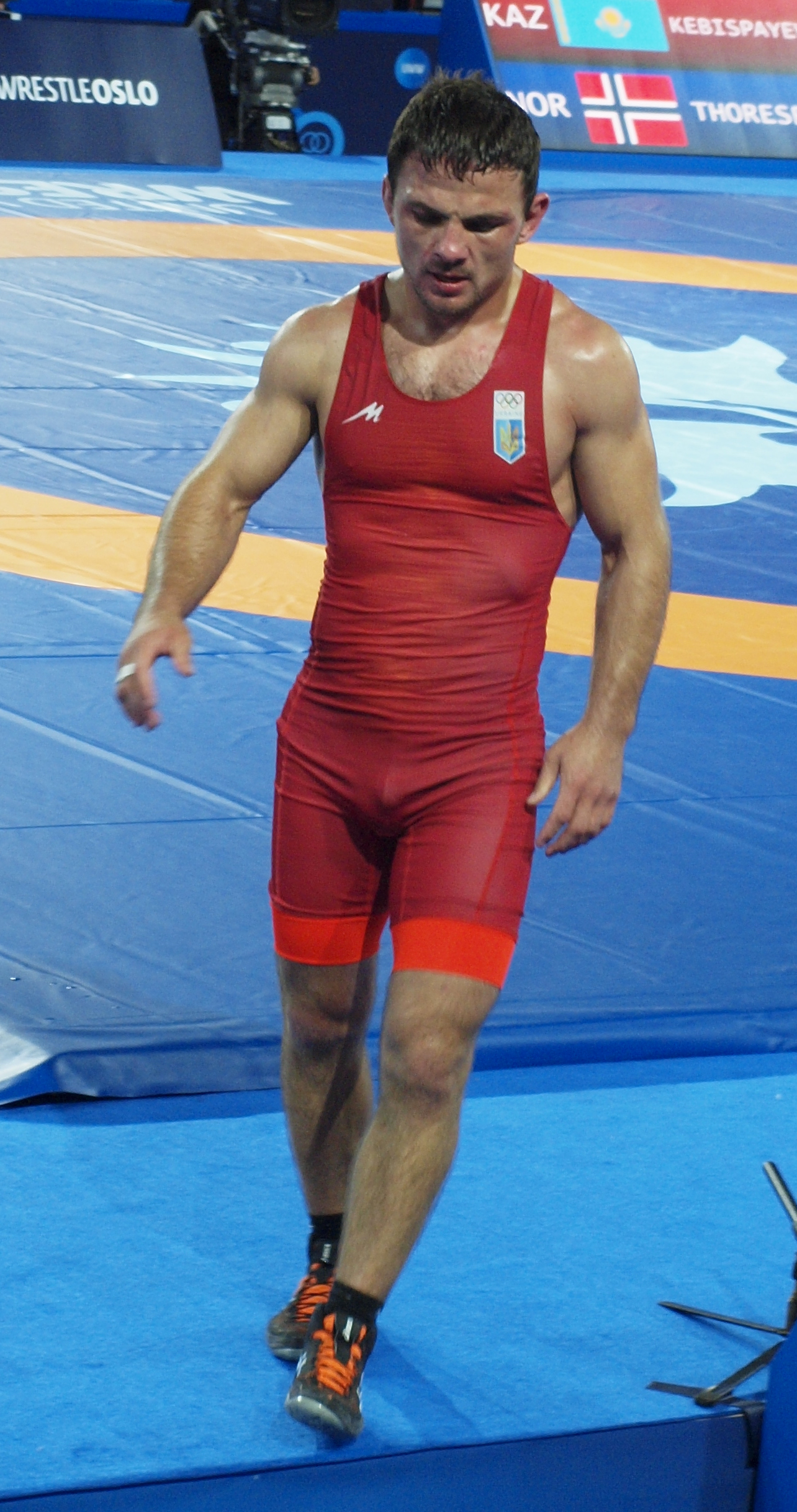

Personal information
- Full name: Lenur Serverovych Temirov
- Nationality: Ukraine
- Born: 1 January 1990 (age 36) Olmaliq, Uzbek SSR, Soviet Union
- Height: 1.67 m (5 ft 5 1/2 in)
- Weight: 66 kg (146 lb)

Sport
- Country: Ukraine (2007-2014, 2018-now); Russia (2014-2017)
- Sport: Wrestling
- Event: Greco-Roman
- Club: Dynamo Simferopol
- Coached by: Ismet Saliev

Achievements and titles
- World finals: 2018 Worlds 3rd at 63 kg.
Medal record
Men's Greco-Roman wrestling
Representing Ukraine
World Championships
Bronze medal – third place	2018 Budapest	63 kg
Bronze medal – third place	2021 Oslo	63 kg
European Championships
Bronze medal – third place	2019 Bucharest	60 kg
Bronze medal – third place	2020 Rome	63 kg

Lenur Serverovych Temirov (Ukrainian: Ленур Серверович Теміров; born 1 January 1990, in Olmaliq, Uzbek SSR) is a Crimean Tatar amateur Greco-Roman wrestler who competes in the men's lightweight category for Ukraine.

== Career ==
He was the 2018 World Championship bronze medalist. He was also a bronze medalist at the 2010 Junior World Championships. Temirov is a member of the wrestling team for Dynamo Simferopol in his current residence Simferopol, and is coached and trained by Ismet Saliev.

Temirov represented his adopted nation Ukraine at the 2012 Summer Olympics in London, where he competed for the men's 60 kg class. However, he lost the qualifying round match to Kazakhstan's Almat Kebispayev, who was able to score eight points in two straight periods, leaving Temirov without a single point.

After the Annexation of Crimea by the Russian Federation Temirov took part in Russian national competitions and was even called to the Russian national team. During that period of his career, he ranked 5th in the Russian National Championships in 2017 and won the All-Russian Wrestling Tournament for Prizes of the Crimean Head Sergei Aksyonov in 2015.
