= Mate Nemeš =

Serbian Greco-Roman wrestler (born 1993)

Personal information
- Born: 21 July 1993 (age 32) Senta, Serbia, FR Yugoslavia

Sport
- Country: Serbia
- Sport: Amateur wrestling
- Weight class: 67 kg
- Event: Greco-Roman
Medal record
Men's Greco-Roman wrestling
Representing Serbia
World Championships
Gold medal – first place	2022 Belgrade	67 kg
Bronze medal – third place	2019 Nur-Sultan	67 kg
Bronze medal – third place	2023 Belgrade	67 kg
European Championships
Gold medal – first place	2021 Warsaw	67 kg
European Games
Bronze medal – third place	2019 Minsk	67 kg
Military World Games
Bronze medal – third place	2019 Wuhan	67 kg

Mate Nemeš (Serbian Cyrillic: Мате Немеш; Hungarian: Nemes Máté; born 21 July 1993) is a Serbian Greco-Roman wrestler. He is a gold medalist at the World Wrestling Championships and the European Wrestling Championships. Nemeš represented Serbia at the 2020 Summer Olympics in Tokyo, Japan and the 2024 Summer Olympics in Paris, France.

== Career ==
Nemeš won one of the bronze medals in the 67 kg event at the 2019 World Wrestling Championships held in Nur-Sultan, Kazakhstan. In the same year, he also represented Serbia at the 2019 European Games in Minsk, Belarus, and he won one of the bronze medals in the 67 kg event.

At the 2019 Military World Games held in Wuhan, China, Nemeš also won one of the bronze medals in the 67 kg event.

Nemeš competed in the 67 kg event at the 2020 Summer Olympics held in Tokyo, Japan. He was eliminated in his first match by Frank Stäbler of Germany. Stäbler went on to win one of the bronze medals.

He competed in the 67 kg event at the 2024 Summer Olympics in Paris, France.

== Personal life ==
Nemeš is a Vojvodina Hungarian. His twin brother Viktor is a fellow wrestler and world champion.

== Achievements ==
Year	Tournament	Location	Result	Event
2019	European Games	Minsk, Belarus	3rd	Greco-Roman 67 kg
2019	World Championships	Nur-Sultan, Kazakhstan	3rd	Greco-Roman 67 kg
2019	Military World Games	Wuhan, China	3rd	Greco-Roman 67 kg
2021	European Championships	Warsaw, Poland	1st	Greco-Roman 67 kg
2022	World Championships	Belgrade, Serbia	1st	Greco-Roman 67 kg
2023	World Championships	Belgrade, Serbia	3rd	Greco-Roman 67 kg
