= Wrestling at the 2019 European Games – Men's Greco-Roman 67 kg =

Men's Greco-Roman 67 kg at the 2019 European Games
- Venue: Minsk Sports Palace
- Date: 28 June and 29 June
- Competitors: 16 from 16 nations

Medalists
gold medal	Zaur Kabaloev	Russia
silver medal	Shmagi Bolkvadze	Georgia
bronze medal	Soslan Daurov	Belarus
bronze medal	Mate Nemeš	Serbia

The Men's Greco-Roman 67 kilogram competition at the 2019 European Games in Minsk was held on 28 and 29 June 2019 at the Minsk Sports Palace.

== Schedule ==
All times are in FET (UTC+03:00)

Date	Time	Event
Friday, 28 June 2019	11:50	1/8 finals
Friday, 28 June 2019	13:00	Quarterfinals
Friday, 28 June 2019	18:10	Semifinals
Saturday, 29 June 2019	11:00	Repechage
Saturday, 29 June 2019	18:30	Finals

== Results ==
Legend

- F — Won by fall
- WO — Won by walkover

=== Main bracket ===
1/8 finals
Oleksii Kalinichenko (UKR)	8
Máté Krasznai (HUN)	0
Mateusz Bernatek (POL)	5
Enes Başar (TUR)	7
Zaur Kabaloev (RUS)	9
Erik Weiß (GER)	0
Soslan Daurov (BLR)	10
Pedro Caldas (POR)	0
Andreas Vetsch (SUI)	0
Mate Nemeš (SRB)	8
Christoph Burger (AUT)	0
Shmagi Bolkvadze (GEO)	8
Svilen Kostadinov (BUL)	0
Karen Aslanyan (ARM)	4^{F}
Karim Jafarov (AZE)	1
Håvard Jørgensen (NOR)	4

Quarterfinals
Oleksii Kalinichenko (UKR)	5^{F}
Enes Başar (TUR)	0
Zaur Kabaloev (RUS)	1
Soslan Daurov (BLR)	1
Mate Nemeš (SRB)	0
Shmagi Bolkvadze (GEO)	2
Karen Aslanyan (ARM)	6
Håvard Jørgensen (NOR)	1

Semifinals
Oleksii Kalinichenko (UKR)	0
Zaur Kabaloev (RUS)	4
Shmagi Bolkvadze (GEO)	5
Karen Aslanyan (ARM)	0

Final
Zaur Kabaloev (RUS)	3
Shmagi Bolkvadze (GEO)	1

=== Repechage ===
Repechage round 1
Erik Weiß (GER)
Soslan Daurov (BLR)	WO
Christoph Burger (AUT)	0
Mate Nemeš (SRB)	9

Bronze medals
Soslan Daurov (BLR)	3
Oleksii Kalinichenko (UKR)	2
Mate Nemeš (SRB)	2
Karen Aslanyan (ARM)	1
