= Zhambolat Lokyaev =

Russian Greco-Roman wrestler

Personal information
- Born: 17 December 1994 (age 31)

Sport
- Country: Russia
- Sport: Amateur wrestling
- Weight class: 63 kg
- Event: Greco-Roman
Medal record
Men's Greco-Roman wrestling
Representing Individual Neutral Athletes
Vehbi Emre & Hamit Kaplan Tournament
Gold medal – first place	2024 Antalya	63 kg
Representing Russia
European Championships
Gold medal – first place	2021 Warsaw	63 kg
Individual World Cup
Gold medal – first place	2020 Belgrade	63 kg

Zhambolat Lokyaev is a Russian Greco-Roman wrestler. He won the gold medal in the 63 kg event at the 2021 European Wrestling Championships held in Warsaw, Poland.

In 2020, he won the gold medal in the 63 kg event at the Individual Wrestling World Cup held in Belgrade, Serbia.

== Achievements ==
Year	Tournament	Location	Result	Event
2021	European Championships	Warsaw, Poland	1st	Greco-Roman 63 kg
