= Qaradağlı, Goranboy =

Qaradağlı
- Municipality
- Location within Azerbaijan
- Coordinates: 40°39′07″N 46°32′48″E
- Country: Azerbaijan
- Rayon: Goranboy

Population
  - Total: 2,928
- Time zone: UTC+4 (AZT)
  - Summer (DST): UTC+5 (AZT)

Qaradağlı (also, Qara-dağlı, and Karadagly) is a village and municipality in the Goranboy Rayon of Azerbaijan. It has a population of 2,928.

== Notable natives ==
- Elman Mukhtarov — 2010 Youth Olympic Games winner.
- Taleh Mammadov — 2022 World Wrestling Championships winner.
- Hasrat Jafarov — 2024 Summer Olimpic Games bronze medalist.
