= Maksim Nehoda =

Belarusian Greco-Roman wrestler

Personal information
- Born: 7 July 1998 (age 28)
- Height: 167 cm (5 ft 6 in)

Sport
- Country: Belarus
- Sport: Amateur wrestling
- Weight class: 63 kg
- Event: Greco-Roman
Medal record
Men's Greco-Roman wrestling
Representing Individual Neutral Athletes
Vehbi Emre & Hamit Kaplan Tournament
Bronze medal – third place	2024 Antalya	67 kg
Representing Belarus
European Championships
Gold medal – first place	2020 Rome	63 kg
World U23 Championships
Bronze medal – third place	2019 Budapest	63 kg

Maksim Nehoda (born 7 July 1998) is a Belarusian Greco-Roman wrestler. He won the gold medal in the 63 kg event at the 2020 European Wrestling Championships held in Rome, Italy.

== Career ==
In 2019, Nehoda won one of the bronze medals in the 63 kg event at the World U23 Wrestling Championship in Budapest, Hungary. Earlier that year, he also competed in the 63 kg event at the 2019 European Wrestling Championships held in Bucharest, Romania and in the 63 kg event at the 2019 World Wrestling Championships held in Nur-Sultan, Kazakhstan.

In April 2021, Nehoda competed in the 67 kg event at the European Wrestling Championships held in Warsaw, Poland. In October 2021, he competed in the 67 kg event at the World Wrestling Championships held in Oslo, Norway.

He competed at the 2024 European Wrestling Olympic Qualification Tournament in Baku, Azerbaijan hoping to qualify for the 2024 Summer Olympics in Paris, France.

== Achievements ==
Year	Tournament	Venue	Result	Event
2020	European Championships	Rome, Italy	1st	Greco-Roman 63 kg
