= Bayati =

Old form of Azerbaijani folk poetry

Bayati (Azerbaijani: Bayatı) is one of the oldest forms of Azerbaijani folk poetry. A bayati consists of four lines, each of which has seven syllables. The rhyme scheme is AABA. Anonymous bayati have been collected as folk wisdom in editions such as Azerbaijani: Xalqımızın deyimləri və duyumları (Our people's sayings and feelings). Bayati can also be strung together in sequence to form longer poems, and there are several bayati dastan, epics, in which all of the verses are bayati; one example is Arzu-Qəmbər.

Some folklorists associate the bayati with women's folk creativity, but male ashigs compose bayati as well. Intriguingly, some scholars argue that the bayati dastan are from a lost repertoire of women's dastan, but so far there is no firm evidence to support this theory. In the Zagatala region of northern Azerbaijan, male and female ashiqs who play the tanbur sing poetry composed only in the bayati meter.
