= Michal Nehoda =

Czech soccer player (born 1976)

Personal information
- Date of birth: 14 November 1976 (age 49)
- Place of birth: Prague, Czechoslovakia
- Height: 1.81 m (5 ft 11 in)
- Position: Forward

Senior career*
Years	Team	Apps	(Gls)
1994–1995	SKP Union Cheb	3	(0)
1995–1996	FK Viktoria Žižkov	24	(2)
1997–1999	FC Petra Drnovice	61	(9)
1999–2000	SK České Budějovice	6	(1)
2000–2001	FC Marila Příbram	23	(0)
2001	Ethnikos Achna FC	11	(3)
2002–2004	FC Tescoma Zlín	34	(6)
2004–2006	SK Hanácká Slavia Kroměříž	25	(3)

International career
1996–1997	Czech Republic U21	6	(3)
- * Club domestic league appearances and goals

Michal Nehoda (born 14 November 1976) is a retired Czech football forward. He played in the Gambrinus liga for numerous clubs, making over 100 league appearances in total. He played football in Cyprus for Ethnikos Achna before returning to the Czech Republic to play for Zlín in 2002.

Nehoda played international football at under-21 level for Czech Republic U21.
