= Wang Lumin =

Chinese Greco-Roman wrestler

Wang Lumin (born December 7, 1990) is a Chinese Greco-Roman wrestler. He competed in the men's Greco-Roman 59 kg event at the 2016 Summer Olympics, in which he was eliminated in the repechage by Arsen Eraliev.
