= Zaur Kabaloev =

Italian Greco-Roman wrestler

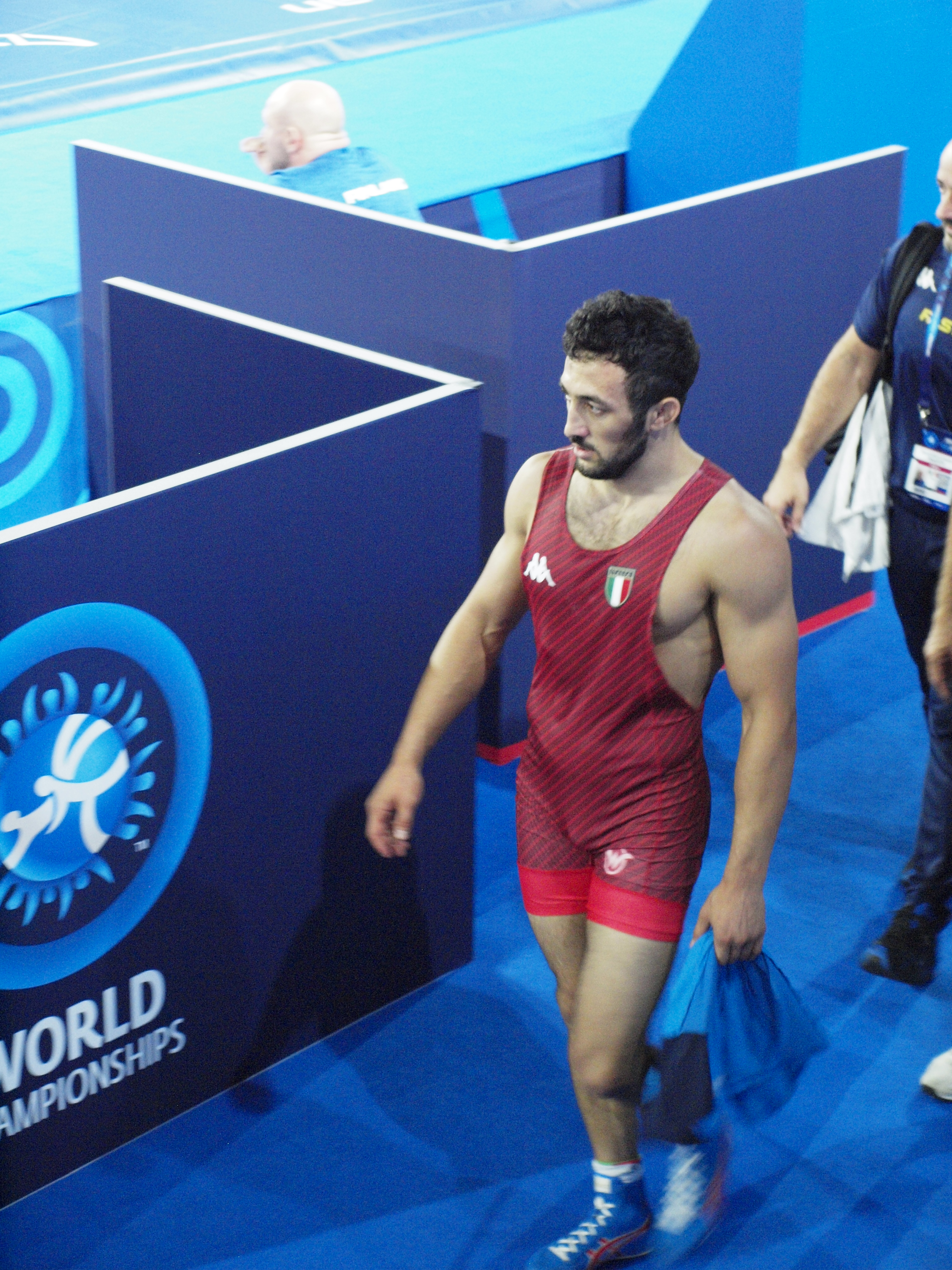
- Zaur Kabaloev at the 2021 World Wrestling Championships in Oslo, Norway

Personal information
- Born: 2 June 1992 (age 34) Ozrek, Kabardino-Balkaria, Russia

Sport
- Country: Italy; Russia
- Sport: Amateur wrestling
- Event: Greco-Roman
Medal record
Men's Greco-Roman wrestling
Representing Russia
European Games
Gold medal – first place	2019 Minsk	67 kg
European Championships
Bronze medal – third place	2018 Kaspiysk	63 kg

Zaur Kabaloev (born 2 June 1992) is a Russian, then Italian Greco-Roman wrestler. In 2019, he won the gold medal in the men's 67 kg event at the European Games held in Minsk, Belarus. In the final, he defeated Shmagi Bolkvadze of Georgia.

In 2018, he won one of the bronze medals in the men's 63 kg event at the European Wrestling Championships held in Kaspiysk, Russia.

== Achievements ==
Year	Tournament	Location	Result	Event
2018	European Championships	Kaspiysk, Russia	3rd	Greco-Roman 63 kg
2019	European Games	Minsk, Belarus	1st	Greco-Roman 67 kg
