= Mingiyan Semenov =

Russian Greco-Roman wrestler

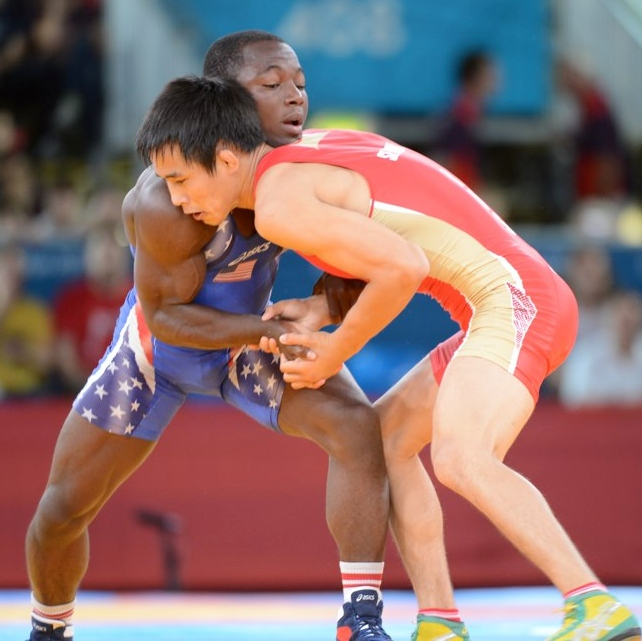
- Semenov (red) vs. Spenser Mango of USA at the 2012 Olympics

Personal information
- Native name: Мингиян Артурович Семенов
- Full name: Mingiyan Arturovich Semyonov
- Nationality: (Russia) Russian
- Born: 11 June 1990 (age 36) Komsomolsky, Kalmykia, Russian SFSR, Soviet Union
- Height: 170 cm (5 ft 7 in)

Sport
- Country: (Russia) Russian
- Sport: Wrestling
- Weight class: 55-59 kg
- Event: Greco-Roman
- Coached by: Buda Zambaiev

Achievements and titles
- Olympic finals: (bronze) (2012)
- World finals: (silver) (2014)
- Regional finals: (gold) (2016) (bronze) (2017)
- National finals: (gold) (2012, 2014, 2018)
Medal record
Men's Greco-Roman wrestling
Representing Russia
Olympic Games
Bronze medal – third place	2012 London	55 kg
World Championships
Silver medal – second place	2014 Tashkent	59 kg
World Cup
Gold medal – first place	2017 Abadan	59 kg
Silver medal – second place	2014 Tehran	59 kg
European Championship
Gold medal – first place	2016 Riga	59 kg
Bronze medal – third place	2017 Novi Sad	59 kg
Representing Kalmykia
Russian National Championships
Gold medal – first place	2018 Odintsovo	60 kg
Gold medal – first place	2014 Ramenskoe	59 kg
Gold medal – first place	2012 Saransk	55 kg
Silver medal – second place	2017 Vladimir	59 kg
Bronze medal – third place	2020 Novosibirsk	60 kg
Bronze medal – third place	2019 Kaliningrad	60 kg
Bronze medal – third place	2016 Grozny	59 kg
Bronze medal – third place	2015 St.Petersburg	59 kg
Bronze medal – third place	2013 St.Petersburg	60 kg
Ivan Poddubny Grand Prix
Gold medal – first place	2017 Moscow	59 kg
Gold medal – first place	2012 Tyumen	55 kg
Silver medal – second place	2018 Krasnodar	60 kg
Bronze medal – third place	2016 Tyumen	59 kg

Mingiyan Arturovich Semyonov (Russian: Мингиян Артурович Семёнов, born 11 June 1990) is a Russian wrestler of Kalmyk descent, who won the bronze medal at the 2012 Summer Olympics in the Greco-Roman 55 kg event. His twin brother Sanal Semenov competes in the same event alongside his brother. He is also the 2016 European Champion and a World Championship silver medalist.
