= Urmatbek Amatov =

Kyrgyz Greco-Roman wrestler

Personal information
- Nationality: Kyrgyz
- Born: 27 May 1993 (age 33)
- Height: 1.66 m (5 ft 5 in)
- Weight: 60 kg (130 lb)

Sport
- Sport: Wrestling
- Event: Greco-Roman
Medal record
Representing Kyrgyzstan
Men's Greco-Roman wrestling
Asian Championships
Silver medal – second place	2018 Bishkek	66 kg
Youth Olympic Games
Gold medal – first place	2010 Singapore	58 kg
- Updated on 19 October 2018

Urmatbek Amatov (born May 27, 1993) is a Kyrgyz Greco-Roman wrestler. He won silver medal at the 2018 Asian Wrestling Championships.

== Major results ==
Year	Tournament	Venue	Result	Event
2010	Youth Olympic Games	Singapore, Singapore	1st	Greco-Roman 58 kg
2018	Asian Championships	Bishkek, Kyrgyzstan	2nd	Greco-Roman 66 kg
2018	World Championships	Budapest, Hungary	12th	Greco-Roman 63 kg
2019	Asian Championships	Xi'an, China	5th	Greco-Roman 66 kg
2021	Asian Championships	Almaty, Kazakhstan	5th	Greco-Roman 63 kg
