= Jesse Thielke =

American Greco-Roman wrestler (born 1992)

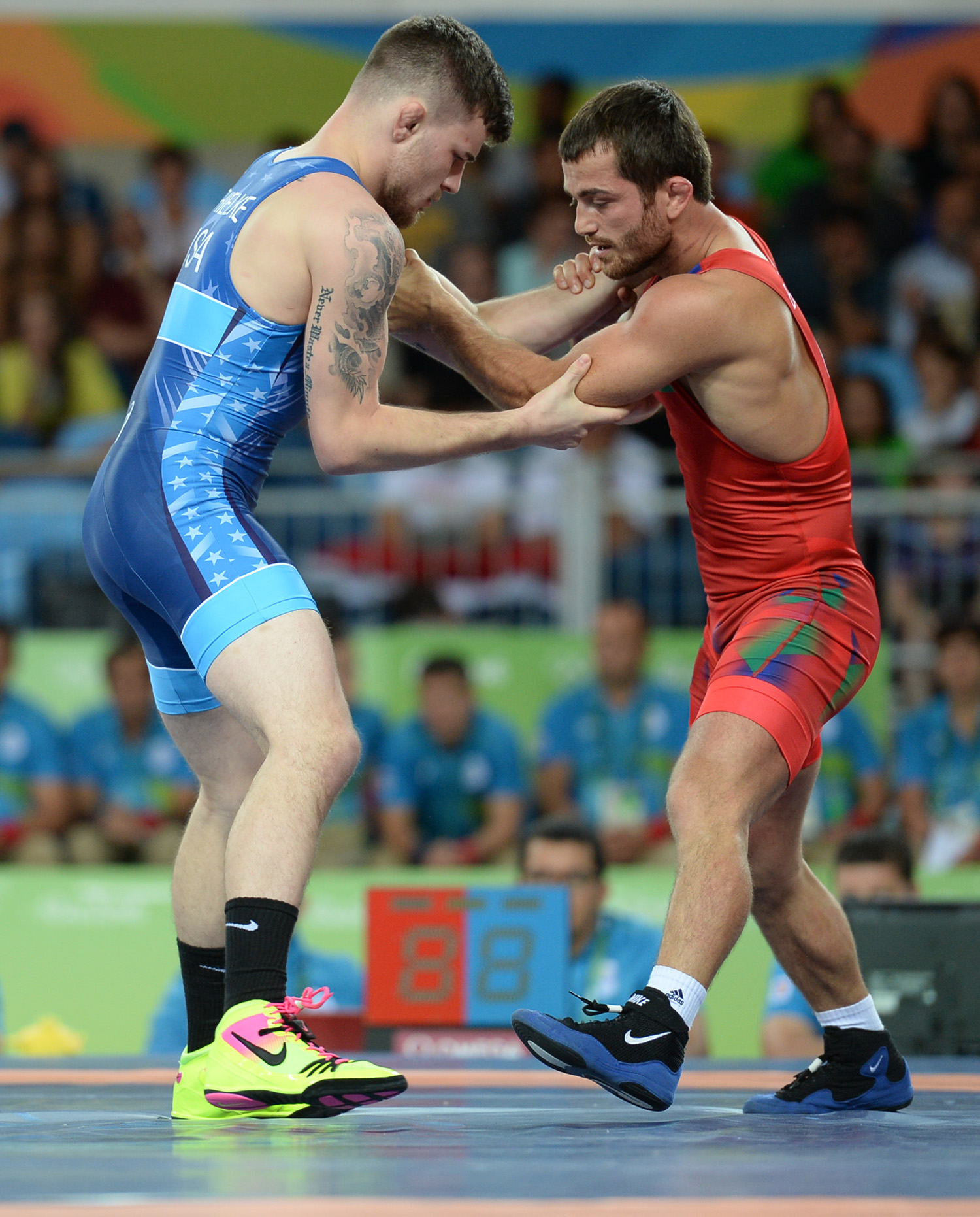
- Thielke (left) against Rovshan Bayramov during the 2016 Olympics

Personal information
- Born: June 9, 1992 (age 34) Kiel, Wisconsin, U.S.
- Home town: Germantown, Wisconsin, U.S.

Sport
- Country: United States
- Sport: Wrestling
- Events: Greco-Roman and Folkstyle
- Club: U.S. Army WCAP; New York Athletic Club
- Team: USA
Medal record
Men's Greco-Roman wrestling
Representing the United States
Grand Prix
Bronze medal – third place	2015 Baku	59 kg
Bronze medal – third place	2016 Zagreb	66 kg
Junior World Championships
Bronze medal – third place	2012 Pattaya	60 kg
Cadet Pan American Championships
Gold medal – first place	2009 Managua	54 kg

Jesse David Thielke (born June 9, 1992) is an American Greco-Roman wrestler who competed at the 2016 Olympics.

== High school career ==
In high school, Thielke was a four-time state champion for Germantown High School in Germantown, Wisconsin. He finished with a record of 186-1, including a victory over eventual Dan Hodge Trophy winner Alex Dieringer.

== College career ==
He wrestled two seasons for the Wisconsin Badgers, before taking an Olympic redshirt in the 2015–2016 season.

== International career ==
He won the 2016 U.S. Olympic Trials, defeating Spenser Mango in the semifinals and Ildar Hafizov in the finals.

Thielke qualified for the 2016 Olympics by finishing second and in the last qualifying spot at the 2016 World Wrestling Olympic Qualification Tournament 2. To qualify he came from behind in the quarterfinals and semifinals.

At the 2016 Olympics, Theilke defeated Mehdi Messaoudi of Morocco in the Round of 16, defeating Messaoudi 8-0. Thielke would then face Rovshan Bayramov, losing 8-0 to the former world champion and two-time Olympic silver medalist.
