= 2018 European Wrestling Championships =

2018 European Championship
- Host city: Kaspiysk, Dagestan, Russia
- Dates: 30 April – 6 May
- Stadium: Ali Aliyev Sport Complex

Champions
- Freestyle: Russia
- Greco-Roman: Russia
- Women: Russia

The 69th UWW European Wrestling Championships was held in Kaspiysk, Dagestan, Russia, between 30 April and 6 May 2018.

== Medal table ==
* Host nation (Russia)

Rank	Nation	Gold	Silver	Bronze	Total
1	Russia*	12	7	4	23
2	Turkey	5	0	8	13
3	Azerbaijan	4	5	9	18
4	Bulgaria	2	1	1	4
5	Armenia	2	0	1	3
6	Belarus	1	4	5	10
7	Georgia	1	3	7	11
8	Romania	1	1	3	5
9	Sweden	1	0	2	3
10	Finland	1	0	1	2
11	Poland	0	2	2	4
12	France	0	2	1	3
12	Serbia	0	2	1	3
14	Germany	0	1	1	2
15	Estonia	0	1	0	1
15	Norway	0	1	0	1
17	Hungary	0	0	5	5
18	Italy	0	0	3	3
19	Moldova	0	0	2	2
19	Ukraine	0	0	2	2
21	Austria	0	0	1	1
21	Greece	0	0	1	1
Totals (22 entries)		30	30	60	120

== Team ranking ==
Rank	Men's freestyle		Men's Greco-Roman		Women's freestyle	
Rank	Team	Points	Team	Points	Team	Points
1	Russia	204	Russia	169	Russia	173
2	Azerbaijan	160	Azerbaijan	113	Belarus	140
3	Turkey	125	Georgia	112	Turkey	117
4	Georgia	110	Armenia	97	Azerbaijan	102
5	Belarus	80	Hungary	71	Bulgaria	92
6	Poland	59	Turkey	67	Poland	75
7	Ukraine	51	Serbia	57	Ukraine	63
8	France	38	Germany	57	Sweden	58
9	Germany	36	Bulgaria	49	Hungary	47
10	Italy	36	Belarus	46	Romania	45

== Medal overview ==
=== Men's freestyle ===
Event	Gold	Silver	Bronze
57 kg	Giorgi Edisherashvili; Azerbaijan	Zaur Uguev; Russia	Stevan Mićić; Serbia
57 kg	Giorgi Edisherashvili; Azerbaijan	Zaur Uguev; Russia	Uladzislau Andreyeu; Belarus
61 kg	Gadzhimurad Rashidov; Russia	Beka Lomtadze; Georgia	Ivan Guidea; Romania
61 kg	Gadzhimurad Rashidov; Russia	Beka Lomtadze; Georgia	Recep Topal; Turkey
65 kg	Haji Aliyev; Azerbaijan	Ilyas Bekbulatov; Russia	Selahattin Kılıçsallayan; Turkey
65 kg	Haji Aliyev; Azerbaijan	Ilyas Bekbulatov; Russia	Vladimer Khinchegashvili; Georgia
70 kg	Magomed Kurbanaliev; Russia	Magomedmurad Gadzhiev; Poland	Zurabi Iakobishvili; Georgia
70 kg	Magomed Kurbanaliev; Russia	Magomedmurad Gadzhiev; Poland	Murtazali Muslimov; Azerbaijan
74 kg	Soner Demirtaş; Turkey	Zelimkhan Khadjiev; France	Andrei Karpach; Belarus
74 kg	Soner Demirtaş; Turkey	Zelimkhan Khadjiev; France	Frank Chamizo; Italy
79 kg	Akhmed Gadzhimagomedov; Russia	Martin Obst; Germany	Mihály Nagy; Hungary
79 kg	Akhmed Gadzhimagomedov; Russia	Martin Obst; Germany	Jabrayil Hasanov; Azerbaijan
86 kg	Artur Naifonov; Russia	Aleksander Gostiyev; Azerbaijan	Sandro Aminashvili; Georgia
86 kg	Artur Naifonov; Russia	Aleksander Gostiyev; Azerbaijan	Shamil Kudiiamagomedov; Italy
92 kg	Abdulrashid Sadulaev; Russia	Sharif Sharifov; Azerbaijan	Serdar Böke; Turkey
92 kg	Abdulrashid Sadulaev; Russia	Sharif Sharifov; Azerbaijan	Kyrylo Mieshkov; Ukraine
97 kg	Vladislav Baitcaev; Russia	Aliaksandr Hushtyn; Belarus	Nurmagomed Gadzhiev; Azerbaijan
97 kg	Vladislav Baitcaev; Russia	Aliaksandr Hushtyn; Belarus	Elizbar Odikadze; Georgia
125 kg	Taha Akgül; Turkey	Geno Petriashvili; Georgia	Robert Baran; Poland
125 kg	Taha Akgül; Turkey	Geno Petriashvili; Georgia	Jamaladdin Magomedov; Azerbaijan

=== Men's Greco-Roman ===
Event	Gold	Silver	Bronze
55 kg	Eldaniz Azizli; Azerbaijan	Helary Mägisalu; Estonia	Ekrem Öztürk; Turkey
55 kg	Eldaniz Azizli; Azerbaijan	Helary Mägisalu; Estonia	Nugzari Tsurtsumia; Georgia
60 kg	Sergey Emelin; Russia	Murad Mammadov; Azerbaijan	Jacopo Sandron; Italy
60 kg	Sergey Emelin; Russia	Murad Mammadov; Azerbaijan	Dato Chkhartishvili; Georgia
63 kg	Mihai Mihuț; Romania	Stig-André Berge; Norway	Donior Islamov; Moldova
63 kg	Mihai Mihuț; Romania	Stig-André Berge; Norway	Zaur Kabaloev; Russia
67 kg	Artem Surkov; Russia	Shmagi Bolkvadze; Georgia	Karen Aslanyan; Armenia
67 kg	Artem Surkov; Russia	Shmagi Bolkvadze; Georgia	Enes Başar; Turkey
72 kg	Adam Kurak; Russia	Rasul Chunayev; Azerbaijan	Daniel Cataraga; Moldova
72 kg	Adam Kurak; Russia	Rasul Chunayev; Azerbaijan	Bálint Korpási; Hungary
77 kg	Roman Vlasov; Russia	Viktor Nemeš; Serbia	Elvin Mursaliyev; Azerbaijan
77 kg	Roman Vlasov; Russia	Viktor Nemeš; Serbia	Tamás Lőrincz; Hungary
82 kg	Maksim Manukyan; Armenia	Viktar Sasunouski; Belarus	Daniel Aleksandrov; Bulgaria
82 kg	Maksim Manukyan; Armenia	Viktar Sasunouski; Belarus	Rafig Huseynov; Azerbaijan
87 kg	Robert Kobliashvili; Georgia	Bekkhan Ozdoev; Russia	Zakarias Berg; Sweden
87 kg	Robert Kobliashvili; Georgia	Bekkhan Ozdoev; Russia	Denis Kudla; Germany
97 kg	Artur Aleksanyan; Armenia	Mikheil Kajaia; Serbia	Elias Kuosmanen; Finland
97 kg	Artur Aleksanyan; Armenia	Mikheil Kajaia; Serbia	Balázs Kiss; Hungary
130 kg	Rıza Kayaalp; Turkey	Vitaly Shchur; Russia	Alin Alexuc-Ciurariu; Romania
130 kg	Rıza Kayaalp; Turkey	Vitaly Shchur; Russia	Iakob Kajaia; Georgia

=== Women's freestyle ===
Event	Gold	Silver	Bronze
50 kg	Mariya Stadnyk; Azerbaijan	Alina Vuc; Romania	Evin Demirhan; Turkey
50 kg	Mariya Stadnyk; Azerbaijan	Alina Vuc; Romania	Milana Dadasheva; Russia
53 kg	Stalvira Orshush; Russia	Vanesa Kaladzinskaya; Belarus	Maria Prevolaraki; Greece
53 kg	Stalvira Orshush; Russia	Vanesa Kaladzinskaya; Belarus	Katarzyna Krawczyk; Poland
55 kg	Iryna Kurachkina; Belarus	Roksana Zasina; Poland	Bediha Gün; Turkey
55 kg	Iryna Kurachkina; Belarus	Roksana Zasina; Poland	Maria Gurova; Russia
57 kg	Bilyana Dudova; Bulgaria	Irina Ologonova; Russia	Emese Barka; Hungary
57 kg	Bilyana Dudova; Bulgaria	Irina Ologonova; Russia	Alyona Kolesnik; Azerbaijan
59 kg	Elif Jale Yeşilırmak; Turkey	Mimi Hristova; Bulgaria	Svetlana Lipatova; Russia
59 kg	Elif Jale Yeşilırmak; Turkey	Mimi Hristova; Bulgaria	Tetiana Omelchenko; Azerbaijan
62 kg	Taybe Yusein; Bulgaria	Inna Trazhukova; Russia	Ilona Prokopevniuk; Ukraine
62 kg	Taybe Yusein; Bulgaria	Inna Trazhukova; Russia	Veranika Ivanova; Belarus
65 kg	Petra Olli; Finland	Elis Manolova; Azerbaijan	Krystsina Fedarashka; Belarus
65 kg	Petra Olli; Finland	Elis Manolova; Azerbaijan	Henna Johansson; Sweden
68 kg	Anastasia Bratchikova; Russia	Koumba Larroque; France	Buse Tosun; Turkey
68 kg	Anastasia Bratchikova; Russia	Koumba Larroque; France	Martina Kuenz; Austria
72 kg	Jenny Fransson; Sweden	Anastasiya Zimiankova; Belarus	Cynthia Vescan; France
72 kg	Jenny Fransson; Sweden	Anastasiya Zimiankova; Belarus	Alexandra Anghel; Romania
76 kg	Yasemin Adar; Turkey	Ekaterina Bukina; Russia	Vasilisa Marzaliuk; Belarus
76 kg	Yasemin Adar; Turkey	Ekaterina Bukina; Russia	Sabira Aliyeva; Azerbaijan

== Participating nations ==
On 3 March 2018, UWW Europe, which includes 48 nations, accepted applications for the championships. On 13 March, Ukraine and Great Britain announced they would not participate at the championships due to political reasons. However, on 16 April the Ukrainian Wrestling Association overruled their decision.

- Armenia (16)
- Austria (10)
- Azerbaijan (29)
- Belarus (29)
- Bulgaria (22)
- Croatia (5)
- Czech Republic (8)
- Denmark (2)
- Estonia (6)
- Finland (8)
- France (11)
- Georgia (20)
- Germany (19)
- Greece (6)
- Hungary (21)
- Israel (7)
- Italy (8)
- Latvia (6)
- Lithuania (10)
- Macedonia (3)
- Moldova (15)
- Norway (4)
- Poland (21)
- Romania (14)
- Russia (30)
- Serbia (9)
- Slovakia (6)
- Slovenia (1)
- Spain (8)
- Sweden (14)
- Switzerland (3)
- Turkey (30)
- Ukraine (30)

== See also ==
- List of European Championships medalists in wrestling (freestyle)
- List of European Championships medalists in wrestling (Greco-Roman)
- List of European Championships medalists in wrestling (women)
