= Jason Afrikaner =

Namibian freestyle wrestler (born 1993)

Personal information
- Full name: Jason Shannon Afrikaner
- Nationality: Namibian
- Born: 23 October 1993 (age 32)
- Height: 1.72 m (5 ft 8 in)
- Weight: 70 kg (150 lb)

Sport
- Sport: Wrestling
- Event: Freestyle
Medal record
Representing Namibia
Men's Freestyle Wrestling
- Updated on 19 October 2018

Jason Afrikaner (born October 23, 1993) is a Namibian freestyle wrestler.

== Major results ==
Year	Tournament	Venue	Result	Event
2010	Youth Olympic Games	Singapore, Singapore	4th	Greco-Roman 58 kg
2015	World Championships	Las Vegas, United States	47th	Freestyle 65 kg
2016	African Championships	Alexandria, Egypt	5th	Freestyle 65 kg
2022	African Championships	El Jadida, Morocco	5th	Freestyle 65 kg
2022	Commonwealth Games	(United Kingdom) Birmingham, Great Britain	10th	Freestyle 65 kg
