= Ibragim Labazanov =

Russian Greco-Roman wrestler

Ibragim Labazanov Ибрагим Лабазанов
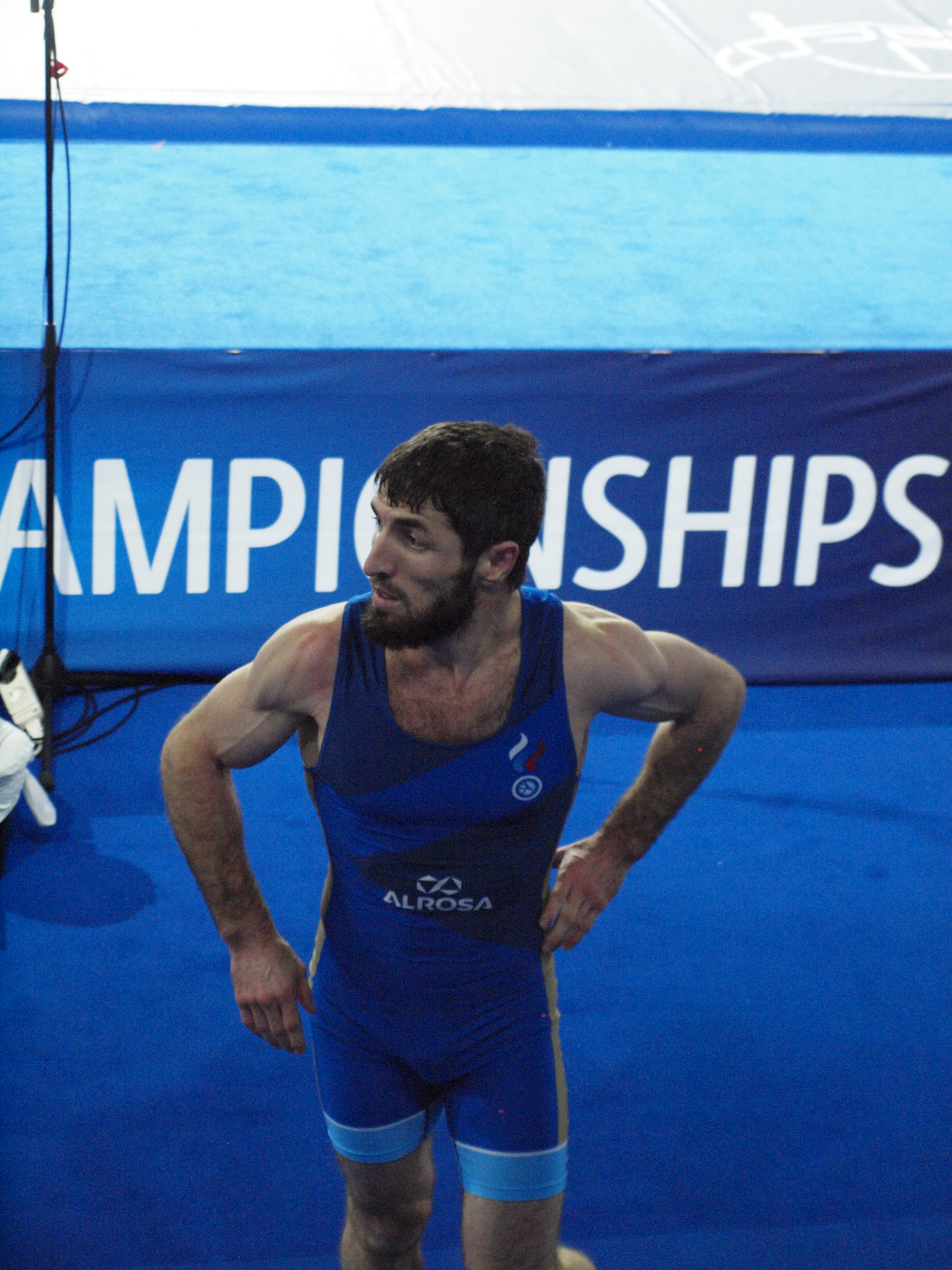
- Labazanov at the 2021 World Championships.

Personal information
- Full name: Ibragim Suleimanovich Labazanov
- National team: Russia
- Born: 15 September 1987 (age 38) Martynovsky District, Rostov Oblast, Russia
- Height: 1.64 m (5 ft 5 in)
- Weight: 59 kg (130 lb)

Sport
- Sport: Wrestling
- Event: Greco-Roman
- Club: KSVSM Power
- Coached by: Islam Dugachev
Medal record
Men's Greco-Roman wrestling
Representing Russia
European Championships
Silver medal – second place	2020 Rome	63 kg
Golden Grand Prix Ivan Poddubny
Gold medal – first place	2016 Tyumen	59 kg
Silver medal – second place	2012 Tyumen	60 kg

Ibragim Suleimanovich Labazanov (Russian: Ибрагим Сулейманович Лабазанов; born 18 April 1991) is a Russian former Greco-Roman wrestler of Chechen descent. He won the national championships in 2016 and 2020, and he competed at the 2016 Summer Olympics in 59 kg, where in the Round of 32 he was eliminated by Almat Kebispayev of Kazakhstan.

He's the older brother of world wrestling champion Chingiz Labazanov.
