= Levani Kavjaradze =

Georgian Greco-Roman wrestler

Personal information
- Born: 21 July 1996 (age 29)
- Height: 166 cm (5 ft 5 in)

Sport
- Country: Georgia
- Sport: Amateur wrestling
- Event: Greco-Roman
Medal record
Men's Greco-Roman wrestling
Representing Georgia
European Championships
Bronze medal – third place	2019 Bucharest	63 kg
World U23 Championships
Silver medal – second place	2019 Budapest	63 kg

Levani Kavjaradze (born 21 July 1996) is a Georgian Greco-Roman wrestler. In 2019, he won one of the bronze medals in the 63 kg event at the 2019 European Wrestling Championships held in Bucharest, Romania.

== Major results ==
Year	Tournament	Location	Result	Event
2019	European Championships	Bucharest, Romania	3rd	Greco-Roman 63 kg
