= Rahman Bilici =

Turkish Greco-Roman wrestler

Personal information
- Nationality: Turkish
- Born: October 28, 1989 (age 36) Aşkale, Erzurum Province, Turkey
- Height: 1.60 m (5 ft 3 in)
- Weight: 63 kg (139 lb)

Sport
- Sport: Sport wrestling
- Event: Greco-Romen
- Club: ASKI, Ankara
- Turned pro: 2007
- Coached by: Mehmet Akif Pirim
Medal record
Men's Greco-Roman wrestling
Representing Turkey
World Championships
Bronze medal – third place	2018 Budapest	63 kg
World Cup
Bronze medal – third place	2010 Yerevan	60 kg
Golden Grand Prix
Silver medal – second place	2014 Szombathely	63 kg
Grand Prix
Silver medal – second place	2018 Zagreb	63 kg
Vehbi Emre & Hamit Kaplan Tournament
Silver medal – second place	2018 Istanbul	63 kg
Bronze medal – third place	2014 Istanbul	63 kg
Dan Kolov & Nikola Petrov Tournament
Gold medal – first place	2013 Plovdiv	63 kg
Bronze medal – third place	2019 Ruse	63 kg
Bronze medal – third place	2014 Sofia	63 kg
World Juniors Championships
Gold medal – first place	2008 Istanbul	60 kg
Gold medal – first place	2007 Beijing	60 kg
Silver medal – second place	2009 Ankara	60 kg
European Juniors Championships
Gold medal – first place	2007 Belgrade	60 kg
Bronze medal – third place	2009 Tbilisi	60 kg
European Cadets Championships
Gold medal – first place	2006 Istanbul	58 kg

Rahman Bilici (pronounced [ˈɾahman ˈbilidʒi]; born October 28, 1989) is a Turkish sport wrestler in the 60 kg division of the Greco-Roman style. The 1.60 m (5.2 ft) tall athlete is a member of ASKI Sports Club in Ankara, where he is coached by Mehmet Akif Pirim.

He was born in Aşkale, Erzurum Province. He began wrestling in the Erzurum Telekom Sports Club, and was admitted in 2000 to the Wrestling Training Center in Yozgat. The successful athlete transferred later to Kayseri Şekerspor. After the closure of the club, he continued to train at the Pansu Sports Club in Kayseri.

Rahman Bilici is the winner of several medals in cadet and junior class at European and World level. He won the gold medal at the World Junior Wrestling Championships in 2007 held in Beijing, China and in 2008 Istanbul, Turkey. He became the silver medalist at the 2009 World Junior Wrestling Championships held in Ankara.

He participated at the 2012 Summer Olympics, where he reached the third round.
