= Donior Islamov =

Moldovan Greco-Roman wrestler

Personal information
- Born: 3 December 1989 (age 36) Tashkent, Uzbek SSR
- Height: 166 cm (5 ft 5 in)

Sport
- Country: Moldova
- Sport: Amateur wrestling
- Event: Greco-Roman
Medal record
Men's Greco-Roman wrestling
Representing Moldova
European Championships
Bronze medal – third place	2016 Riga	59 kg
Bronze medal – third place	2018 Kaspiysk	63 kg

Donior Islamov (born 3 December 1989) is a Moldovan Greco-Roman wrestler. He is a two-time bronze medalist at the European Wrestling Championships.

== Career ==
Islamov competed in the 55 kg event at the 2010 World Wrestling Championships held in Moscow, Russia without winning a medal. He was eliminated in his first match by Péter Módos of Hungary. The following year, he competed in the 55 kg event at the 2011 World Wrestling Championships held in Istanbul, Turkey where he was eliminated in his third match by Bekkhan Mankiev of Russia.

In 2013, Islamov competed in the 60 kg event at the European Wrestling Championships in Tbilisi, Georgia and in the 60 kg at the World Wrestling Championships in Budapest, Hungary. In both competitions he was eliminated in his first match. The following year, he competed in the 66 kg at the 2014 World Wrestling Championships held in Tashkent, Uzbekistan where he was eliminated in his second match.

In 2015, Islamov represented Moldova at the European Games held in Baku, Azerbaijan in the 66 kg event without winning a medal. The following year, he won one of the bronze medals in the 59 kg event at the 2016 European Wrestling Championships held in Riga, Latvia. In his bronze medal match he defeated Kristijan Fris of Serbia. At the 2018 European Wrestling Championships held in Kaspiysk, Russia, he won one of the bronze medals in the 63 kg event. In 2020, he competed in the 67 kg event at the Individual Wrestling World Cup held in Belgrade, Serbia.

In January 2021, Islamov won one of the bronze medals in the 67 kg event at the Grand Prix Zagreb Open held in Zagreb, Croatia. In March 2021, he competed at the European Qualification Tournament in Budapest, Hungary hoping to qualify for the 2020 Summer Olympics in Tokyo, Japan. He reached the semi-finals where he lost against Bálint Korpási of Hungary. In April 2021, he lost his bronze medal match in the 67 kg event at the European Wrestling Championships held in Warsaw, Poland. In May 2021, he also failed to qualify for the Olympics at the World Olympic Qualification Tournament held in Sofia, Bulgaria.

Islamov competed in the 67 kg event at the 2022 World Wrestling Championships held in Belgrade, Serbia.

== Achievements ==
Year	Tournament	Location	Result	Event
2016	European Championships	Riga, Latvia	3rd	Greco-Roman 59 kg
2018	European Championships	Kaspiysk, Russia	3rd	Greco-Roman 63 kg
