= Erik Torba =

Hungarian Greco-Roman wrestler

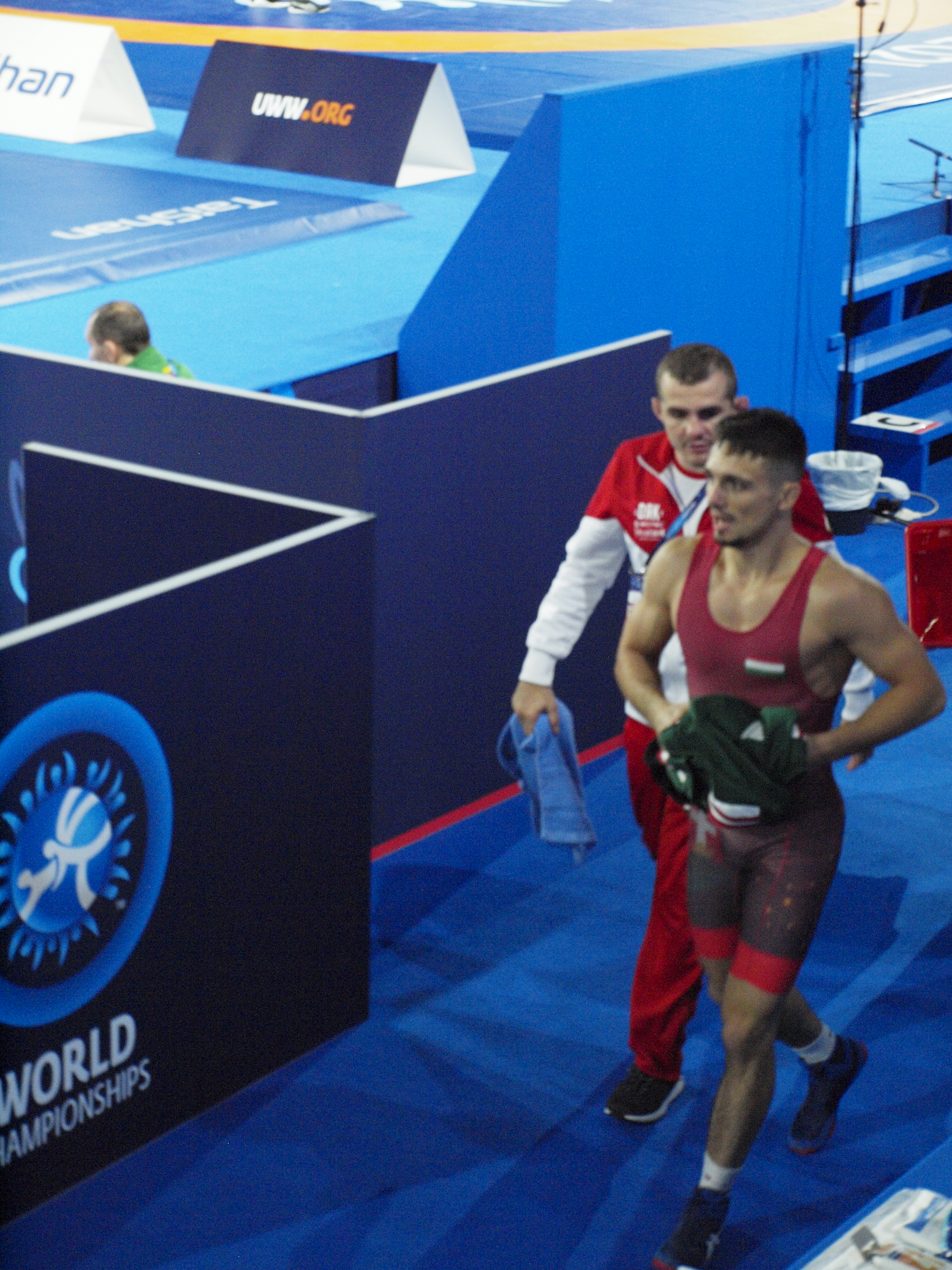
- Erik Torba at the 2021 World Wrestling Championships in Oslo, Norway

Personal information
- Born: 1 February 1996 (age 30)
- Height: 164 cm (5 ft 5 in)

Sport
- Country: Hungary
- Sport: Amateur wrestling
- Weight class: 60 kg; 63 kg
- Event: Greco-Roman
Medal record
Men's Greco-Roman wrestling
Representing Hungary
Individual World Cup
Silver medal – second place	2020 Belgrade	63 kg
European Games
Silver medal – second place	2019 Minsk	60 kg
European Championships
Bronze medal – third place	2020 Rome	63 kg
European U23 Championship
Bronze medal – third place	2019 Novi Sad	63 kg

Erik Torba (born 1 February 1996) is a Hungarian Greco-Roman wrestler. He is a silver medalist at the European Games and a bronze medalist at the European Wrestling Championships.

== Career ==
Torba competed in the men's 59 kg event at the 2017 European Wrestling Championships in Novi Sad, Serbia and the 2017 World Wrestling Championships in Paris, France. At the beginning of 2018, United World Wrestling implemented changes to the weight classes used in wrestling and in that year he began competing in the 60 kg and 63 kg weight classes. He competed in the men's 60 kg event both at the 2018 European Wrestling Championships in Kaspiysk, Russia and the 2018 World Wrestling Championships in Budapest, Hungary.

Torba represented Hungary at the 2019 European Games in Minsk, Belarus and he won the silver medal in the 60 kg event. In the final, he lost against Stepan Maryanyan of Russia. He also competed in the 60 kg event at the 2019 World Wrestling Championships in Nur-Sultan, Kazakhstan.

In 2020, Torba won one of the bronze medals in the 63 kg event at the European Wrestling Championships held in Rome, Italy. In that same year, he also won the silver medal in the 63 kg event at the Individual Wrestling World Cup held in Belgrade, Serbia.

In March 2021, Torba competed at the European Qualification Tournament in Budapest, Hungary hoping to qualify for the 2020 Summer Olympics in Tokyo, Japan. He won his first two matches and he was then unable to qualify as he lost his match in the semi-finals against Kerem Kamal of Turkey.

In 2022, Torba won one of the bronze medals in the 63 kg event at the Dan Kolov & Nikola Petrov Tournament held in Veliko Tarnovo, Bulgaria. He lost his bronze medal match in the 60 kg event at the 2022 European Wrestling Championships held in Budapest, Hungary. A few months later, he competed at the Matteo Pellicone Ranking Series 2022 held in Rome, Italy.

== Achievements ==
Year	Tournament	Venue	Result	Event
2019	European Games	Minsk, Belarus	2nd	Greco-Roman 60 kg
2020	European Championships	Rome, Italy	3rd	Greco-Roman 63 kg
