= Stig-André Berge =

Norwegian Greco-Roman wrestler

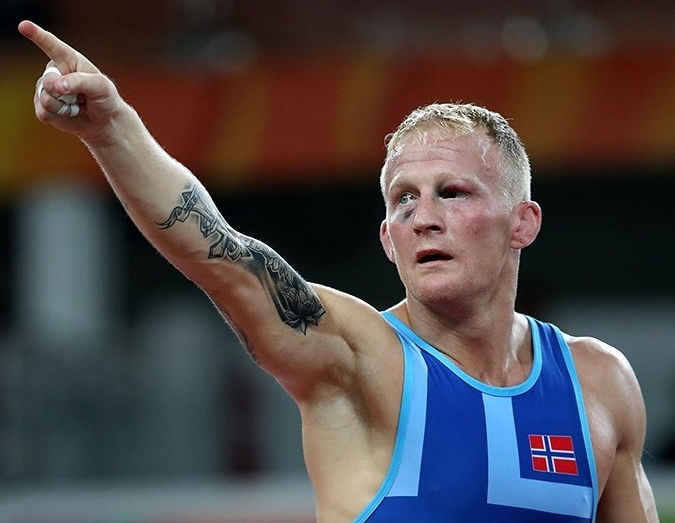
- Berge at the 2016 Summer Olympics

Personal information
- Nationality: Norway
- Born: 20 July 1983 (age 43) Oslo, Norway
- Education: Norwegian University of Science and Technology
- Height: 1.64 m (5 ft 4 1/2 in)
- Weight: 59 kg (130 lb)

Sport
- Sport: Wrestling
- Event: Greco-Roman
- Club: Oslo Bryteklubb
- Coached by: Jimmy Lidberg; Fritz Aanes
Medal record
Representing Norway
Olympic Games
Bronze medal – third place	2016 Rio de Janeiro	59 kg
World Championships
Bronze medal – third place	2014 Tashkent	59 kg
European Championships
Silver medal – second place	2007 Sofia	60 kg
Silver medal – second place	2018 Kaspiysk	63 kg
Silver medal – second place	2019 Bucharest	63 kg

Stig-André Berge (born 20 July 1983) is a Norwegian Greco-Roman wrestling coach and former wrestler, who competed in the categories between 59–63 kg. He is a three-time Olympian and won a bronze medal in the men's Greco-Roman 59 kg at the 2016 Summer Olympics. Berge is also a World Championships bronze medallist and three-time European Championships silver medallist.

Berge retired from wrestling after the 2021 World Championships. Following his retirement, he coached the Norwegian national wrestling team together with Fritz Aanes.

== Early life ==
Berge was born in Oslo on 20 July 1983. He began wrestling at the age of five.

== Career ==
Berge made his senior international championship debut at the 2001 European Championships in Istanbul. He won his first senior international medal when he placed second in the men's Greco-Roman 60 kg event at the 2007 European Championships in Sofia. He made his Olympic Games debut in the men's Greco-Roman 60 kg event at the 2008 Summer Olympics in Beijing. Berge represented Norway at the 2012 Summer Olympics in London, where he placed 13th in the men's Greco-Roman 60 kg event. He won a bronze medal in the men's Greco-Roman 59 kg event at the 2014 World Championships in Tashkent.

Berge won one of the bronze medals in the men's Greco-Roman 59 kg event at the 2016 Summer Olympics in Rio, becoming the first Norwegian since 1992 to win an Olympic medal in wrestling. He won a silver medal in the men's Greco-Roman 63 kg event at the 2018 European Championships in Kaspiysk and 2019 European Championships in Bucharest. Following the 2021 World Championships in Oslo, Berge retired as an active wrestler. He later coached the Norwegian national wrestling team with Fritz Aanes until November 2022.

== Television appearances ==
Berge was among the participants in the 14th season of Mesternes Mester, a NRK series which sees former competitive Norwegian athletes compete in various exercises to earn the title "Master of Masters". He was chosen by Linn Jørum Sulland to take part in the second night test of the season, falling short to the former handball player.

Berge took part in the 19th season of Skal vi danse, the Norwegian version of Dancing with the Stars, alongside professional dancer Norunn Ringvoll. The pair finished fifth.

Summary
Week no.	Dance	Song	Judges' scores	Total	Result
1	Jive	"Take on Me"	6 + 6 + 5	17	No elimination
2	Argentine tango	"Legend"	6 + 7 + 5	18	Doubt
3	Modern	"Another Love"	9 + 10 + 9	28	Safe
4	Pasodoble	"Eye of the Tiger"	8 + 8 + 8	24	Safe
5	Boogie-woogie	"Choo Choo Ch'Boogie"	9 + 7 + 9	26	Safe
6	Salsa	"Everybody (Backstreet's Back)"	7 + 7 + 6	20	Safe
7	Quickstep	"From Now On"	8 + 8 + 8	24	Doubt
8	Foxtrot	"All of Me"	9 + 9 + 8	26	Safe
9	Tango	"Belle"	8 + 9 + 9	26	Duel - eliminated

In 2025, Berge won the third season of Sistemann ut - the Norwegian version of 99 to Beat.

== Personal life ==
Berge is married to fellow former wrestler Rosell Utne. His father Bjørn Berge is a former junior national champion in wrestling. Berge's mother died of cancer in 2016.
