= Taleh Mammadov =

Azerbaijani Greco-Roman wrestler

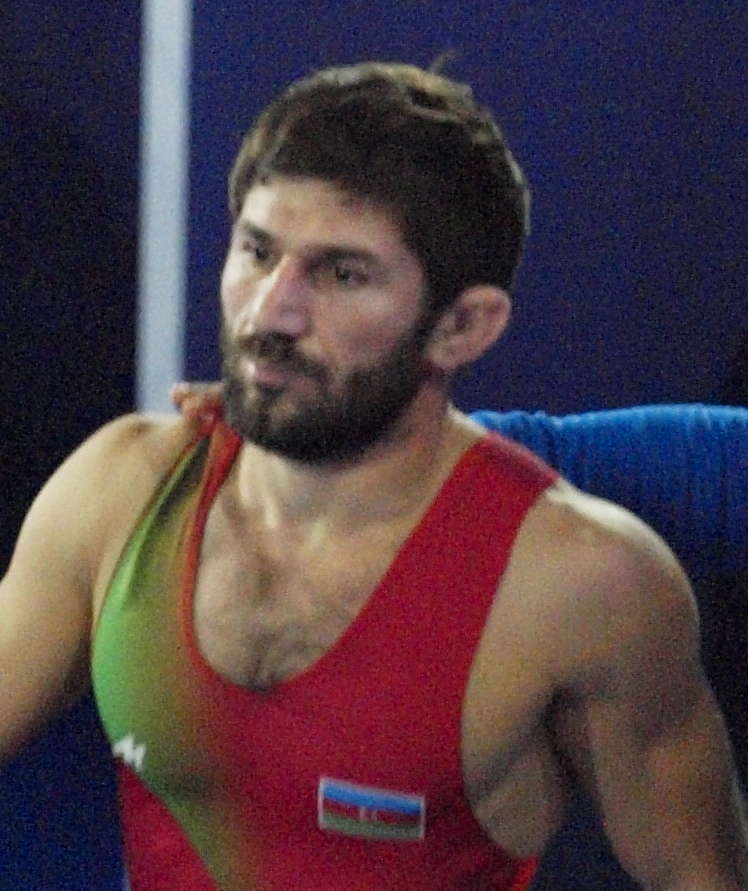
- Mammadov at the 2021 World Wrestling Championships in Oslo, Norway

Personal information
- Native name: Taleh Məmmədov
- Born: 16 August 1989 (age 37) Qaradağlı, Azerbaijan

Sport
- Country: Azerbaijan
- Sport: Amateur wrestling
- Weight class: 63 kg
- Event: Greco-Roman
Medal record
Men's Greco-Roman wrestling
Representing Azerbaijan
World Championships
Bronze medal – third place	2022 Belgrade	63 kg
European Championships
Silver medal – second place	2021 Warsaw	63 kg
Silver medal – second place	2022 Budapest	63 kg
Silver medal – second place	2023 Zagreb	63 kg
Bronze medal – third place	2019 Bucharest	63 kg
Grand Prix
Gold medal – first place	2022 Rome	63 kg
Gold medal – first place	2023 Zagreb	63 kg

Taleh Mammadov (Azerbaijani: Taleh Məmmədov; born 16 August 1989) is a retired Azerbaijani Greco-Roman wrestler. He was born in Qaradağlı, Goranboy, Azerbaijan.

Competing in the 63 kg weight category, Mammadov is a World Championship bronze medalist (2022 Belgrade) and a four-time European Championship medalist, securing three silver medals (2021 Warsaw, 2022 Budapest, 2023 Zagreb) and one bronze medal (2019 Bucharest). He also captured a gold medal at the 2021 Islamic Solidarity Games in Konya and multiple titles at prestigious Grand Prix tournaments.

== Career ==
In 2019, he won one of the bronze medals in the 63 kg event at the European Wrestling Championships held in Bucharest, Romania. In his bronze medal match he defeated Slavik Galstyan of Armenia.

In 2020, he competed in the men's 63 kg event at the Individual Wrestling World Cup held in Belgrade, Serbia. In 2021, he won the silver medal in the 63 kg event at the European Wrestling Championships held in Warsaw, Poland.

In 2022, he won one of the bronze medals in his event at the Vehbi Emre & Hamit Kaplan Tournament held in Istanbul, Turkey. He won the silver medal in the 63 kg event at the European Wrestling Championships held in Budapest, Hungary. A few months later, he won the gold medal in his event at the Matteo Pellicone Ranking Series 2022 held in Rome, Italy.

== Achievements ==
Year	Tournament	Location	Result	Event
2019	European Championships	Bucharest, Romania	3rd	Greco-Roman 63 kg
2021	European Championships	Warsaw, Poland	2nd	Greco-Roman 63 kg
2022	European Championships	Budapest, Hungary	2nd	Greco-Roman 63 kg
2022	World Championships	Belgrade, Serbia	3rd	Greco-Roman 63 kg
2023	European Championships	Zagreb, Croatia	2nd	Greco-Roman 63 kg
