= Mihai Mihuț =

Romanian Greco-Roman wrestler

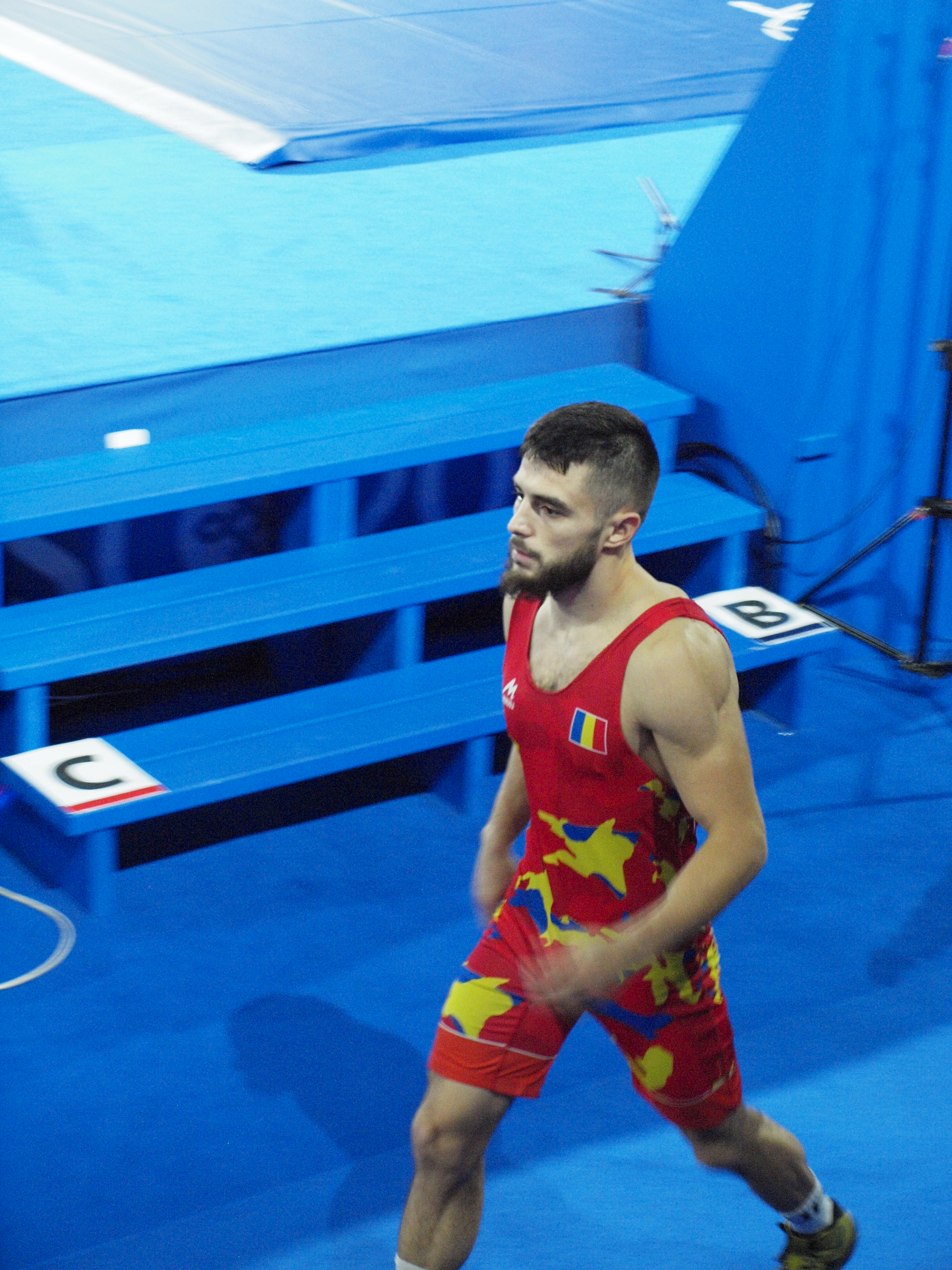
- Mihut at the 2021 World Wrestling Championships in Oslo, Norway

Personal information
- Born: 16 March 1995 (age 31)
- Height: 168 cm (5 ft 6 in)

Sport
- Country: Romania
- Sport: Amateur wrestling
- Weight class: 63 kg
- Event: Greco-Roman
Medal record
Men's Greco-Roman wrestling
Representing Romania
European Championships
Gold medal – first place	2018 Kaspiysk	63 kg
World U23 Championships
Bronze medal – third place	2018 Bucharest	63 kg
European U23 Championship
Gold medal – first place	2018 Istanbul	63 kg

Mihai Radu Mihuț (born 16 March 1995) is a Romanian Greco-Roman wrestler. He is a gold medalist at the European Wrestling Championships.

== Career ==
Mihuț won the gold medal in the 63 kg event at the 2018 European Wrestling Championships held in Kaspiysk, Russia. In the final, he defeated Stig-André Berge of Norway. In that same year, Mihuț also won the gold medal in the men's 63 kg event at the 2018 European U23 Wrestling Championship held in Istanbul, Turkey.

In 2020, Mihuț competed in the men's 63 kg event at the Individual Wrestling World Cup held in Belgrade, Serbia. In March 2021, he competed at the European Qualification Tournament in Budapest, Hungary hoping to qualify for the 2020 Summer Olympics in Tokyo, Japan. He was eliminated in his first match by Islambek Dadov of Azerbaijan.

In 2022, Mihuț competed in the 67 kg event at the European Wrestling Championships in Budapest, Hungary where he was eliminated in his first match. A few months later, he lost his bronze medal match in his event at the Matteo Pellicone Ranking Series 2022 held in Rome, Italy.

Mihuț competed at the 2024 European Wrestling Olympic Qualification Tournament in Baku, Azerbaijan hoping to qualify for the 2024 Summer Olympics in Paris, France. He was eliminated in his second match and he did not qualify for the Olympics. Mihuț also competed at the 2024 World Wrestling Olympic Qualification Tournament held in Istanbul, Turkey without qualifying for the Olympics.

== Achievements ==
Year	Tournament	Location	Result	Event
2018	European Championships	Kaspiysk, Russia	1st	Greco-Roman 63 kg
