= 2024 Polyák Imre & Varga János Memorial Tournament =

- Host city: Budapest, Hungary
- Dates: 6–9 June 2024
- Stadium: SYMA Sports and Conference Centre

Champions
- Freestyle: Georgia
- Greco-Roman: Iran
- Women: Ukraine

The 2024 Polyák Imre & Varga János Memorial Tournament, was a wrestling event held in Budapest, Hungary between 6 and 9 June 2024. With an aim to reward wrestlers participating in Ranking Series tournaments, the United World Wrestling awarded prize money to the medal winners in all weight classes with a total prize money of 390,000 Swiss Francs. The gold medal winners at the four Ranking Series tournaments in 2023 received 1500 Swiss Francs with the silver medallists getting 750 Swiss Francs. The two bronze medallists received 500 Swiss Francs each.

== Ranking Series ==
Ranking Series Calendar 2024:

- 1st Ranking Series: 10–14 January, Croatia, Zagreb ⇒ 2024 Grand Prix Zagreb Open
- 2nd Ranking Series: 6–9 June, Hungary, Budapest ⇒ 2024 Polyák Imre & Varga János Memorial Tournament

== Competition schedule ==
All times are (UTC+1)

| Date | Time | Event |
|---|---|---|
| 6 June | 10.30-15.00 | Qualification rounds & repechage FS 57-61-65-70-79-97-125 kg |
| 6 June | 17.00-20.30 | Final matches and awarding ceremony: FS 57-61-65-70-79-97-125 kg |
| 7 June | 10.30-15.00 | Qualification rounds & repechage FS 74-86-92 kg & WW 50-53-57-59-72 kg |
| 7 June | 17.00-20.30 | Final matches and awarding ceremony: FS 61-70-79 kg & WW 50-53-57-59-72 kg |
| 8 June | 10.30-15.00 | Qualification rounds & repechage WW 55-62-65-68-76 kg & GR 60-63-130 kg |
| 8 June | 17.00-20.30 | Final matches and awarding ceremony: WW 55-62-65-68-76 kg & GR 60-63-130 kg |
| 9 June | 10.30-15.00 | Qualification rounds & repechage GR 55-67-72-77-82-87-97 kg |
| 9 June | 17.00-20.30 | Final matches and awarding ceremony: GR 55-67-72-77-82-87-97 kg |

== Medal table ==
* Host nation (Hungary)

| Rank | Nation | Gold | Silver | Bronze | Total |
|---|---|---|---|---|---|
| 1 | Iran | 3 | 4 | 10 | 17 |
| 2 | Georgia | 3 | 3 | 6 | 12 |
| 3 | Azerbaijan | 3 | 1 | 1 | 5 |
| 4 | Japan | 3 | 0 | 1 | 4 |
| 5 | Kazakhstan | 2 | 2 | 2 | 6 |
| 6 | Armenia | 2 | 1 | 0 | 3 |
| 6 | Ukraine | 2 | 1 | 0 | 3 |
| 8 | China | 2 | 0 | 3 | 5 |
| 9 | Hungary* | 1 | 6 | 2 | 9 |
| 10 | Turkey | 1 | 1 | 2 | 4 |
| 10 | United States | 1 | 1 | 2 | 4 |
| 12 | Bulgaria | 1 | 1 | 0 | 2 |
| 13 | Poland | 1 | 0 | 4 | 5 |
| 14 | Canada | 1 | 0 | 1 | 2 |
| 14 | Cuba | 1 | 0 | 1 | 2 |
| 16 | Colombia | 1 | 0 | 0 | 1 |
| 16 | Sweden | 1 | 0 | 0 | 1 |
| 16 | Uzbekistan | 1 | 0 | 0 | 1 |
| 19 | India | 0 | 4 | 0 | 4 |
| 20 | Kyrgyzstan | 0 | 1 | 3 | 4 |
| 21 | Mongolia | 0 | 1 | 2 | 3 |
| 22 | Moldova | 0 | 1 | 1 | 2 |
| 22 | Venezuela | 0 | 1 | 1 | 2 |
| 24 | Egypt | 0 | 1 | 0 | 1 |
| 25 | South Korea | 0 | 0 | 2 | 2 |
| 26 | Algeria | 0 | 0 | 1 | 1 |
| 26 | Croatia | 0 | 0 | 1 | 1 |
| 26 | Ecuador | 0 | 0 | 1 | 1 |
| 26 | Norway | 0 | 0 | 1 | 1 |
| 26 | Romania | 0 | 0 | 1 | 1 |
| 26 | Slovakia | 0 | 0 | 1 | 1 |
| – | Individual Neutral Athletes | 0 | 0 | 1 | 1 |
| Totals (31 entries) | | 30 | 30 | 51 | 111 |

== Team ranking ==
| Rank | Men's freestyle | | Men's Greco-Roman | | Women's freestyle | |
| Rank | Team | Points | Team | Points | Team | Points |
|---|---|---|---|---|---|---|
| 1 | Georgia | 133 | Iran | 173 | Ukraine | 96 |
| 2 | Iran | 117 | Georgia | 137 | Poland | 85 |
| 3 | United States | 70 | Hungary | 113 | Hungary | 70 |
| 4 | Hungary | 67 | Azerbaijan | 85 | India | 68 |
| 5 | Japan | 65 | Cuba | 48 | Turkey | 64 |
| 6 | Kyrgyzstan | 65 | Bulgaria | 45 | Kazakhstan | 63 |
| 7 | Azerbaijan | 57 | Egypt | 40 | Canada | 62 |
| 8 | Kazakhstan | 55 | Moldova | 37 | China | 50 |
| 9 | Armenia | 50 | Japan | 35 | Mongolia | 50 |
| 10 | Uzbekistan | 43 | South Korea | 35 | Ecuador | 31 |

== Medal overview ==
=== Men's freestyle ===
| Event | Gold | Silver | Bronze |
|---|---|---|---|
| 57 kg | Rei Higuchi; Japan | Aman Sehrawat; India | Almaz Smanbekov; Kyrgyzstan |
| 57 kg | Rei Higuchi; Japan | Aman Sehrawat; India | Aryan Tsiutryn; Individual Neutral Athletes |
| 61 kg | Arsen Harutyunyan; Armenia | Taiyrbek Zhumashbek Uulu; Kyrgyzstan | Nahshon Garrett; United States |
| 61 kg | Arsen Harutyunyan; Armenia | Taiyrbek Zhumashbek Uulu; Kyrgyzstan | Shahdad Khosravi; Iran |
| 65 kg | Kotaro Kiyooka; Japan | Abbas Ebrahimzadeh; Iran | Haji Aliyev; Azerbaijan |
| 70 kg | Arman Andreasyan; Armenia | Vazgen Tevanyan; Armenia | Akaki Kemertelidze; Georgia |
| 70 kg | Arman Andreasyan; Armenia | Vazgen Tevanyan; Armenia | Alibek Osmonov; Kyrgyzstan |
| 74 kg | Razambek Zhamalov; Uzbekistan | Murad Kuramagomedov; Hungary | Ali Rezaei; Iran |
| 74 kg | Razambek Zhamalov; Uzbekistan | Murad Kuramagomedov; Hungary | Orozobek Toktomambetov; Kyrgyzstan |
| 79 kg | Otari Bagauri; Georgia | Adel Panaeian; Iran | Achsarbek Gulajev; Slovakia |
| 86 kg | Hassan Yazdani; Iran | Trent Hidlay; United States | Evsem Shvelidze; Georgia |
| 86 kg | Hassan Yazdani; Iran | Trent Hidlay; United States | Hayato Ishiguro; Japan |
| 92 kg | Miriani Maisuradze; Georgia | Iuza Tsertsvadze; Georgia | Balázs Juhász; Hungary |
| 97 kg | Alisher Yergali; Kazakhstan | Magomedkhan Magomedov; Azerbaijan | İbrahim Çiftçi; Turkey |
| 97 kg | Alisher Yergali; Kazakhstan | Magomedkhan Magomedov; Azerbaijan | Rizabek Aitmukhan; Kazakhstan |
| 125 kg | Mason Parris; United States | Yusup Batirmurzaev; Kazakhstan | Givi Matcharashvili; Georgia |
| 125 kg | Mason Parris; United States | Yusup Batirmurzaev; Kazakhstan | Geno Petriashvili; Georgia |

=== Men's Greco-Roman ===
| Event | Gold | Silver | Bronze |
|---|---|---|---|
| 55 kg | Eldaniz Azizli; Azerbaijan | Pouya Dadmarz; Iran | Nugzari Tsurtsumia; Georgia |
| 60 kg | Pridon Abuladze; Georgia | Mehdi Mohsennejad; Iran | Kim Da-hyun; South Korea |
| 60 kg | Pridon Abuladze; Georgia | Mehdi Mohsennejad; Iran | Amir Reza Dehbozorgi; Iran |
| 63 kg | Murad Mammadov; Azerbaijan | Victor Ciobanu; Moldova | Raiber Rodríguez; Venezuela |
| 63 kg | Murad Mammadov; Azerbaijan | Victor Ciobanu; Moldova | Meisam Dalkhani; Iran |
| 67 kg | Luis Orta; Cuba | Leri Abuladze; Georgia | Mohammad Reza Geraei; Iran |
| 67 kg | Luis Orta; Cuba | Leri Abuladze; Georgia | Saeid Esmaeili; Iran |
| 72 kg | Hasrat Jafarov; Azerbaijan | Moustafa Alameldin; Egypt | István Váncza; Hungary |
| 72 kg | Hasrat Jafarov; Azerbaijan | Moustafa Alameldin; Egypt | Danial Sohrabi; Iran |
| 77 kg | Nao Kusaka; Japan | Aik Mnatsakanian; Bulgaria | Mohammad Reza Mokhtari; Iran |
| 77 kg | Nao Kusaka; Japan | Aik Mnatsakanian; Bulgaria | Yosvanys Peña; Cuba |
| 82 kg | Erik Szilvássy; Hungary | Gela Bolkvadze; Georgia | Mihail Bradu; Moldova |
| 82 kg | Erik Szilvássy; Hungary | Gela Bolkvadze; Georgia | Karlo Kodrić; Croatia |
| 87 kg | Semen Novikov; Bulgaria | Dávid Losonczi; Hungary | Bachir Sid Azara; Algeria |
| 87 kg | Semen Novikov; Bulgaria | Dávid Losonczi; Hungary | Mohammad Hossein Mahmoodi; Iran |
| 97 kg | Mohammad Hadi Saravi; Iran | Alex Szőke; Hungary | Shayan Habibzare; Iran |
| 97 kg | Mohammad Hadi Saravi; Iran | Alex Szőke; Hungary | Giorgi Melia; Georgia |
| 130 kg | Fardin Hedayati; Iran | Dáriusz Vitek; Hungary | Lee Seung-chan; South Korea |
| 130 kg | Fardin Hedayati; Iran | Dáriusz Vitek; Hungary | Alin Alexuc-Ciurariu; Romania |

=== Women's freestyle ===
| Event | Gold | Silver | Bronze |
|---|---|---|---|
| 50 kg | Feng Ziqi; China | Dolgorjavyn Otgonjargal; Mongolia | Zhang Yu; China |
| 50 kg | Feng Ziqi; China | Dolgorjavyn Otgonjargal; Mongolia | Zhu Jiang; China |
| 53 kg | Jonna Malmgren; Sweden | Antim Panghal; India | Katarzyna Krawczyk; Poland |
| 53 kg | Jonna Malmgren; Sweden | Antim Panghal; India | Zeynep Yetgil; Turkey |
| 55 kg | Jowita Wrzesień; Poland | Róza Szenttamási; Hungary | Amanda Martinez; United States |
| 57 kg | Hong Kexin; China | Anshu Malik; India | Anhelina Lysak; Poland |
| 57 kg | Hong Kexin; China | Anshu Malik; India | Zhang Qi; China |
| 59 kg | Alina Filipovych; Ukraine | Diana Kayumova; Kazakhstan | Magdalena Głodek; Poland |
| 62 kg | Ana Godinez; Canada | Iryna Koliadenko; Ukraine | Pürevdorjiin Orkhon; Mongolia |
| 62 kg | Ana Godinez; Canada | Iryna Koliadenko; Ukraine | Grace Bullen; Norway |
| 65 kg | Iryna Bondar; Ukraine | Nesrin Baş; Turkey | Miki Rowbottom; Canada |
| 68 kg | Buse Tosun Çavuşoğlu; Turkey | Soleymi Caraballo; Venezuela | Wiktoria Chołuj; Poland |
| 68 kg | Buse Tosun Çavuşoğlu; Turkey | Soleymi Caraballo; Venezuela | Enkhsaikhany Delgermaa; Mongolia |
| 72 kg | Zhamila Bakbergenova; Kazakhstan | Noémi Szabados; Hungary | Gulmaral Yerkebayeva; Kazakhstan |
| 76 kg | Tatiana Rentería; Colombia | Reetika Hooda; India | Génesis Reasco; Ecuador |

== Participating nations ==
280 wrestlers from 46 countries:

1. Individual Neutral Athletes (10)
2. Algeria (10)
3. Armenia (3)
4. Australia (1)
5. Azerbaijan (11)
6. Brazil (3)
7. Bulgaria (3)
8. Canada (5)
9. Chile (2)
10. China (5)
11. Colombia (4)
12. Croatia (3)
13. Cuba (3)
14. Czech Republic (1)
15. Ecuador (4)
16. Egypt (7)
17. France (4)
18. Germany (1)
19. Georgia (27)
20. Honduras (2)
21. Hungary (33) (Host)
22. India (5)
23. Iran (22)
24. Japan (5)
25. Kazakhstan (16)
26. Kyrgyzstan (5)
27. South Korea (6)
28. Moldova (5)
29. Mongolia (3)
30. Mexico (1)
31. Nigeria (1)
32. Norway (1)
33. New Zealand (1)
34. Poland (6)
35. Puerto Rico (3)
36. Romania (2)
37. Serbia (2)
38. San Marino (1)
39. Switzerland (1)
40. Slovakia (4)
41. Sweden (1)
42. Tunisia (4)
43. Turkey (9)
44. Ukraine (6)
45. United States (14)
46. Uzbekistan (8)
47. Venezuela (3)
48. UWW (1)

== Results ==
=== Men's freestyle ===
==== Men's freestyle 57 kg ====
Round of 16
Ali Momeni (IRI) | 2
Gulomjon Abdullaev (UZB) | 6

Quarterfinals
Aliabbas Rzazade (AZE) | 4^{F}
Gulomjon Abdullaev (UZB) | 0
Rei Higuchi (JPN) | 11
Almaz Smanbekov (KGZ) | 0
Roberti Dingashvili (GEO) | 1
Aman Sehrawat (IND) | 11
Darian Cruz (PUR) | 1
Aryan Tsiutryn (AIN) | 3

Semifinals
Aliabbas Rzazade (AZE) | 8
Rei Higuchi (JPN) | 19
Aman Sehrawat (IND) | 14
Aryan Tsiutryn (AIN) | 4

Final
Rei Higuchi (JPN) | 11
Aman Sehrawat (IND) | 1

Bronze medals
Almaz Smanbekov (KGZ) | WO
Aliabbas Rzazade (AZE)
Roberti Dingashvili (GEO) | 0
Aryan Tsiutryn (AIN) | 10

==== Men's freestyle 61 kg ====
Round of 16
Nika Zakashvili (GEO) | 0
Taiyrbek Zhumashbek Uulu (KGZ) | 13
Giorgi Goniashvili (GEO) | 9
Bekbolot Myrzanazar Uulu (KGZ) | 8

Quarterfinals
Gamal Mohamed (EGY) | 1
Taiyrbek Zhumashbek Uulu (KGZ) | 12
Nahshon Garrett (USA) | WO
~~Abdelhak Kherbache (ALG)~~
Shahdad Khosravi (IRI) | 10
Nils Leutert (SUI) | 0
Giorgi Goniashvili (GEO) | 5
Arsen Harutyunyan (ARM) | 18

Semifinals
Taiyrbek Zhumashbek Uulu (KGZ) | 10^{F}
Nahshon Garrett (USA) | 1
Shahdad Khosravi (IRI) | 3
Arsen Harutyunyan (ARM) | 7

Final
Taiyrbek Zhumashbek Uulu (KGZ) | 1
Arsen Harutyunyan (ARM) | 4

Repechage round 1
Nika Zakashvili (GEO) | 3
Gamal Mohamed (EGY) | 2

Bronze medal match
Nika Zakashvili (GEO) | 3
Nahshon Garrett (USA) | 13
Giorgi Goniashvili (GEO) | 0
Shahdad Khosravi (IRI) | 8

==== Men's freestyle 65 kg ====
| Pos | Athlete | Pld | W | L | CP | TP | JPN | AZE | HUN | UZB |
|---|---|---|---|---|---|---|---|---|---|---|
| 1 | Kotaro Kiyooka (JPN) | 3 | 2 | 1 | 9 | 9 | — | 2–5 | 7–2 | WO |
| 2 | Haji Aliyev (AZE) | 3 | 2 | 1 | 9 | 8 | 3–1 PO1 | — | 3–9 | WO |
| 3 | Ismail Musukaev (HUN) | 3 | 2 | 1 | 7 | 18 | 1–3 PO1 | 3–1 PO1 | — | 7–2 |
| — | Umidjon Jalolov (UZB) | 3 | 0 | 3 | 1 | 2 | 0–5 FO | 0–5 FO | 1–3 PO1 | — |

Source: UWW

| Pos | Athlete | Pld | W | L | CP | TP | IRI | MEX | HUN |
|---|---|---|---|---|---|---|---|---|---|
| 1 | Abbas Ebrahimzadeh (IRI) | 2 | 2 | 0 | 7 | 17 | — | 7–2 | 10–0 |
| 2 | Austin Gomez (MEX) | 2 | 1 | 1 | 5 | 12 | 1–3 PO1 | — | 10–0 |
| 3 | György Szilágyi (HUN) | 2 | 0 | 2 | 0 | 0 | 0–4 SU | 0–4 SU | — |

Source: UWW

Semifinals
Kotaro Kiyooka (JPN) | 12
Austin Gomez (MEX) | 6
Abbas Ebrahimzadeh (IRI) | 6
Haji Aliyev (AZE) | 0

Final
Kotaro Kiyooka (JPN) | 12
Abbas Ebrahimzadeh (IRI) | 8
Bronze medal
Austin Gomez (MEX) | 3
Haji Aliyev (AZE) | 12

==== Men's freestyle 70 kg ====
| Quarterfinals | | Semifinals | | Final |
| Mohammad-Ali Amouzad (IRI) | 0 |
| Akaki Kemertelidze (GEO) | 10 | Akaki Kemertelidze (GEO) | 6 |
| Arman Andreasyan (ARM) | 9 | Arman Andreasyan (ARM) | 7 |
| Evan Henderson (USA) | 2 | | | Arman Andreasyan (ARM) | WO |
| Vazgen Tevanyan (ARM) | 11 | | | Vazgen Tevanyan (ARM) |
| Alibek Osmonov (KGZ) | 0 | Vazgen Tevanyan (ARM) | 2 |
| Marcell Dely (HUN) | 0 | Edemi Bolkvadze (GEO) | 1 |
| Edemi Bolkvadze (GEO) | 7 |

Bronze medals
Evan Henderson (USA) | 4
Akaki Kemertelidze (GEO) | 14
Alibek Osmonov (KGZ) | 3
Edemi Bolkvadze (GEO) | 3

==== Men's freestyle 74 kg ====
Round of 16
Anthony Montero (VEN) | 0
Razambek Zhamalov (UZB) | 5

Quarterfinals
Giorgi Elbakidze (GEO) | 3
Razambek Zhamalov (UZB) | 5
Ali Rezaei (IRI) | 5
Turan Bayramov (AZE) | 0
Bekzod Abdurakhmonov (UZB) | 13
Adam Thomson (CAN) | 1
Murad Kuramagomedov (HUN) | 3
Orozobek Toktomambetov (KGZ) | 0

Semifinals
Razambek Zhamalov (UZB) | 7^{F}
Ali Rezaei (IRI) | 0
Bekzod Abdurakhmonov (UZB) | 4
Murad Kuramagomedov (HUN) | 6

Final
Razambek Zhamalov (UZB) | 7
Murad Kuramagomedov (HUN) | 4

Repechage round 1
Anthony Montero (VEN) | 3
Giorgi Elbakidze (GEO) | 5

Bronze medal match
Giorgi Elbakidze (GEO) | 3
Ali Rezaei (IRI) | 5
Orozobek Toktomambetov (KGZ) | WO
Bekzod Abdurakhmonov (UZB)

==== Men's freestyle 79 kg ====
| Pos | Athlete | Pld | W | L | CP | TP | SVK | GEO | GEO |
|---|---|---|---|---|---|---|---|---|---|
| 1 | Achsarbek Gulajev (SVK) | 2 | 2 | 0 | 7 | 12 | — | 2–2 | 10–0 |
| 2 | Otari Bagauri (GEO) | 2 | 1 | 1 | 4 | 14 | 1–3 PO1 | — | 12–4 |
| 3 | Piruzi Kvlividze (GEO) | 2 | 0 | 2 | 1 | 4 | 0–4 SU | 1–3 PO1 | — |

Source: UWW

| Pos | Athlete | Pld | W | L | CP | TP | ALG | IRI | BUL |
|---|---|---|---|---|---|---|---|---|---|
| 1 | Chemseddine Fetairia (ALG) | 2 | 1 | 1 | 0 | 11 | — | 10–0 | 1–5 |
| 2 | Adel Panaeian (IRI) | 2 | 1 | 1 | 4 | 11 | 0–4 SU | — | 11–0 |
| 3 | Mihail Georgiev (BUL) | 2 | 1 | 1 | 3 | 5 | 3–1 PO1 | 0–4 SU | — |

Source: UWW

Semifinals
Chemseddine Fetairia (ALG) | 0
Otari Bagauri (GEO) | 11
Achsarbek Gulajev (SVK) | 4
Adel Panaeian (IRI) | 6

Final
Otari Bagauri (GEO) | 6
Adel Panaeian (IRI) | 5
Bronze medal
Chemseddine Fetairia (ALG)
Achsarbek Gulajev (SVK) | WO

==== Men's freestyle 86 kg ====
Round of 16
Evsem Shvelidze (GEO) | 12
Fateh Benferdjallah (ALG) | 2
Jayden Lawrence (AUS) | 3
Bobur Islomov (UZB) | 6
Hassan Yazdani (IRI) | 13
Ethan Ramos (PUR) | 2
Myles Amine (SMR) | 1
Azamat Dauletbekov (KAZ) | 3

Quarterfinals
Patrik Mezei (HUN) | 2
Evsem Shvelidze (GEO) | 12
Bobur Islomov (UZB) | 0
Trent Hidlay (USA) | 11
Hayato Ishiguro (JPN) | 2
Hassan Yazdani (IRI) | 12
Azamat Dauletbekov (KAZ) | 3
Patrik Püspöki (HUN) | 0

Semifinals
Evsem Shvelidze (GEO) | 3
Trent Hidlay (USA) | 13
Hassan Yazdani (IRI) | 10
Azamat Dauletbekov (KAZ) | 0

Final
Trent Hidlay (USA) | 2
Hassan Yazdani (IRI) | 12

Repechage round 1
Ethan Ramos (PUR)
Hayato Ishiguro (JPN) | WO

Bronze medal match
Bobur Islomov (UZB) | 3
Evsem Shvelidze (GEO) | 7
Hayato Ishiguro (JPN) | 5
Azamat Dauletbekov (KAZ) | 1

==== Men's freestyle 92 kg ====
| Pos | Athlete | Pld | W | L | CP | TP | GEO | GEO | HUN | HUN |
|---|---|---|---|---|---|---|---|---|---|---|
| 1 | Miriani Maisuradze (GEO) | 3 | 3 | 0 | 7 | 18 | — | 7–2 | 10–0 | 11–0 |
| 2 | Iuza Tsertsvadze (GEO) | 3 | 2 | 1 | 7 | 19 | 1–3 PO1 | — | 8–3 | 8–0 |
| 3 | Balázs Juhász (HUN) | 3 | 1 | 2 | 4 | 8 | 0–4 SU | 1–3 PO1 | — | 5–2 |
| 4 | Krisztián Angyal (HUN) | 3 | 0 | 3 | 1 | 2 | 0–4 SU | 0–3 PO | 1–3 PO1 | — |

Source: UWW

==== Men's freestyle 97 kg ====
Round of 16
Alisher Yergali (KAZ) | 4
İbrahim Çiftçi (TUR) | 1
Batyrbek Tsakulov (SVK) | 10
Aliaksandr Hushtyn (AIN) | 0

Quarterfinals
Zaur Beradze (GEO) | 2
Alisher Yergali (KAZ) | 6
Abolfazl Babaloo (IRI) | 8
Richárd Végh (HUN) | 0
Rizabek Aitmukhan (KAZ) | 13
Mostafa El-Ders (EGY) | 5
Batyrbek Tsakulov (SVK) | 2
Magomedkhan Magomedov (AZE) | 12

Semifinals
Alisher Yergali (KAZ) | 3
Abolfazl Babaloo (IRI) | 2
Rizabek Aitmukhan (KAZ) | 7
Magomedkhan Magomedov (AZE) | 15

Final
Alisher Yergali (KAZ) | WO
Magomedkhan Magomedov (AZE)

Repechage round 1
İbrahim Çiftçi (TUR) | 6
Zaur Beradze (GEO) | 3

Bronze medal match
İbrahim Çiftçi (TUR) | 4
Abolfazl Babaloo (IRI) | 3
Batyrbek Tsakulov (SVK) | 2
Rizabek Aitmukhan (KAZ) | 4

==== Men's freestyle 125 kg ====
Round of 16
Jonovan Smith (PUR) | WO
Georgi Ivanov (BUL)
Geno Petriashvili (GEO) | WO
Milán Korcsog (HUN)

Quarterfinals
Giorgi Meshvildishvili (AZE)
Jonovan Smith (PUR) | WO
Mason Parris (USA) | 9
Givi Matcharashvili (GEO) | 2
Diaaeldin Kamal (EGY) | 1
Yusup Batirmurzaev (KAZ) | 6
Geno Petriashvili (GEO) | 7
Dzianis Khramiankou (AIN) | 0

Semifinals
Jonovan Smith (PUR) | 0
Mason Parris (USA) | 10
Yusup Batirmurzaev (KAZ) | 4^{F}
Geno Petriashvili (GEO) | 2

Final
Mason Parris (USA) | 2^{F}
Yusup Batirmurzaev (KAZ) | 0

Bronze medals
Givi Matcharashvili (GEO) | 11
Jonovan Smith (PUR) | 0
Diaaeldin Kamal (EGY) | 0
Geno Petriashvili (GEO) | 10

=== Men's Greco-Roman ===
==== Men's Greco-Roman 55 kg ====
| Pos | Athlete | Pld | W | L | CP | TP | AZE | IRI | GEO | BRA |
|---|---|---|---|---|---|---|---|---|---|---|
| 1 | Eldaniz Azizli (AZE) | 3 | 3 | 0 | 11 | 23 | — | 6–1 | 8–0 | 9–0 |
| 2 | Pouya Dadmarz (IRI) | 3 | 2 | 1 | 7 | 12 | 1–3 PO1 | — | 6–4 | 5–1 |
| 3 | Nugzari Tsurtsumia (GEO) | 3 | 1 | 2 | 5 | 13 | 0–4 SU | 1–3 PO1 | — | 9–0 |
| 4 | Marat Garipov (BRA) | 3 | 0 | 3 | 1 | 1 | 0–4 SU | 1–3 PO1 | 0–4 SU | — |

Source: UWW

==== Men's Greco-Roman 60 kg ====
| Quarterfinals | | Semifinals | | Final |
| Aidos Sultangali (KAZ) | 8 |
| Kim Da-hyun (KOR) | 9 | Kim Da-hyun (KOR) | 0 |
| Jamal Valizadeh (UWW) | 0 | Mehdi Mohsennejad (IRI) | 8 |
| Mehdi Mohsennejad (IRI) | 11 | | | Mehdi Mohsennejad (IRI) | 5 |
| Amir Reza Dehbozorgi (IRI) | 0 | | | Pridon Abuladze (GEO) | 6 |
| Pridon Abuladze (GEO) | 4 | Pridon Abuladze (GEO) | 9 |
| Abdelkarim Fergat (ALG) | 6 | Abdelkarim Fergat (ALG) | 0 |
| Dalton Roberts (USA) | 3 |

Bronze medals
Jamal Valizadeh (UWW) | 1
Kim Da-hyun (KOR) | 9
Amir Reza Dehbozorgi (IRI) | 7
Abdelkarim Fergat (ALG) | 0

==== Men's Greco-Roman 63 kg ====
Round of 16
Victor Ciobanu (MDA) | 9
Raiber Rodríguez (VEN) | 6

Quarterfinals
Kevin de Armas (CUB) | 1
Victor Ciobanu (MDA) | 10
Răzvan Arnăut (ROU) | 7
Jeong Yeong-woo (KOR) | 0
Levente Tóth (HUN) | 0
Murad Mammadov (AZE) | 11
Enes Başar (TUR) | 0
Meisam Dalkhani (IRI) | 10^{C}

Semifinals
Victor Ciobanu (MDA) | 8
Răzvan Arnăut (ROU) | 3
Murad Mammadov (AZE) | 10
Meisam Dalkhani (IRI) | 1

Final
Victor Ciobanu (MDA) | 0
Murad Mammadov (AZE) | 10

Repechage round 1
Raiber Rodríguez (VEN) | 4^{F}
Kevin de Armas (CUB) | 2

Bronze medal match
Raiber Rodríguez (VEN) | 12
Răzvan Arnăut (ROU) | 4
Levente Tóth (HUN) | 0
Meisam Dalkhani (IRI) | 11

==== Men's Greco-Roman 67 kg ====
Round of 16
Andrés Montaño (ECU) | 9
Ishak Ghaiou (ALG) | 0
Joni Khetsuriani (GEO) | 1
Mamadassa Sylla (FRA) | 1
Mohammad Reza Geraei (IRI) | 4
Souleymen Nasr (TUN) | 2
Dávid Mányik (HUN) | 0
Luis Orta (CUB) | 8
Saeid Esmaeili (IRI) | 10
Néstor Almanza (CHI) | 0

Quarterfinals
Leri Abuladze (GEO) | 10
Andrés Montaño (ECU) | 0
Mamadassa Sylla (FRA) | 1
Mohammad Reza Geraei (IRI) | 5
Kyotaro Sogabe (JPN) | 1
Luis Orta (CUB) | 7
Saeid Esmaeili (IRI) | 6
Valentin Petic (MDA) | 0

Semifinals
Leri Abuladze (GEO) | 6
Mohammad Reza Geraei (IRI) | 1
Luis Orta (CUB) | 9
Saeid Esmaeili (IRI) | 7

Final
Leri Abuladze (GEO) | 0
Luis Orta (CUB) | 4

Repechage round 1
Dávid Mányik (HUN)
Kyotaro Sogabe (JPN) | WO

Bronze medal match
Andrés Montaño (ECU) | 3
Mohammad Reza Geraei (IRI) | 3
Kyotaro Sogabe (JPN) | 5
Saeid Esmaeili (IRI) | 6

==== Men's Greco-Roman 72 kg ====
Round of 16
Kang Hyeon-jin (KOR) | 2
Ulvu Ganizade (AZE) | 3
Moustafa Alameldin (EGY) | 3
Gagik Snjoyan (FRA) | 0
Ibrahim Ghanem (FRA) | 13
Otar Abuladze (GEO) | 12
Shmagi Bolkvadze (GEO) | 7
Ádám Pohilec (HUN) | 0
Hasrat Jafarov (AZE) | 12
Danial Sohrabi (IRI) | 6

Quarterfinals
István Váncza (HUN) | 4
Ulvu Ganizade (AZE) | 2^{R}
Moustafa Alameldin (EGY) | 10
Ibrahim Ghanem (FRA) | 1
Alejandro Sancho (USA) | 2
Shmagi Bolkvadze (GEO) | 3
Hasrat Jafarov (AZE) | 7
Krisztofer Klányi (HUN) | 0

Semifinals
István Váncza (HUN) | 1
Moustafa Alameldin (EGY) | 2
Shmagi Bolkvadze (GEO) | 1
Hasrat Jafarov (AZE) | 7

Final
Moustafa Alameldin (EGY) | 2
Hasrat Jafarov (AZE) | 5

Repechage round 1
Gagik Snjoyan (FRA) | 1
Ibrahim Ghanem (FRA) | 1
Danial Sohrabi (IRI) | 7
Krisztofer Klányi (HUN) | 0

Bronze medal match
Gagik Snjoyan (FRA) | 1
István Váncza (HUN) | 2
Danial Sohrabi (IRI) | 7
Shmagi Bolkvadze (GEO) | 3

==== Men's Greco-Roman 77 kg ====
| Final |
| Nao Kusaka (JPN) | WO |
| Aik Mnatsakanian (BUL) |

Qualification
Nao Kusaka (JPN) | 11
Abdelkrim Ouakali (ALG) | 3

Round of 16
Pavel Puklavec (CRO) | 0
Mohammad Mokhtari (IRI) | 10
Nao Kusaka (JPN) | 6
Iuri Lomadze (GEO) | 0
Sanan Suleymanov (AZE) | WO
Demeu Zhadrayev (KAZ)
Róbert Fritsch (HUN) | 2
Mohammadali Geraei (IRI) | 7

Quarterfinals
Mohammad Reza Mokhtari (IRI) | 0
Nao Kusaka (JPN) | 9
Sanan Suleymanov (AZE) | 6
Mohammadali Geraei (IRI) | 1

Semifinals
Nao Kusaka (JPN) | 2
Sanan Suleymanov (AZE) | 1

Qualification
Levente Lévai (HUN) | 0
Zoltán Lévai (HUN) | 4^{F}
Jair Cuero (COL) | 4
Mahmoud Abdelrahman (EGY) | 7

Round of 16
Burhan Akbudak (TUR)
Jesse Porter (USA) | 0
Zoltán Lévai (HUN) | 6
Denis Horváth (SVK) | 2
Aik Mnatsakanian (BUL) | 1
Mahmoud Abdelrahman (EGY) | 1
Yosvanys Peña (CUB) | 9
Nemanja Kimoski (SRB) | 1

Quarterfinals
Burhan Akbudak (TUR) | WO
Zoltán Lévai (HUN)
Aik Mnatsakanian (BUL) | 3
Yosvanys Peña (CUB) | 1

Semifinals
Burhan Akbudak (TUR) | 1
Aik Mnatsakanian (BUL) | 1

Repechage round 1
Abdelkrim Ouakali (ALG) | 0
Iuri Lomadze (GEO) | 10

Repechage round 2
Iuri Lomadze (GEO) | 4^{R}
Mohammad Reza Mokhtari (IRI) | 10
Mahmoud Abdelrahman (EGY) | 1
Yosvanys Peña (CUB) | 4

Bronze medals
Mohammad Reza Mokhtari (IRI) | WO
Sanan Suleymanov (AZE)
Yosvanys Peña (CUB) | WO
Burhan Akbudak (TUR)

==== Men's Greco-Roman 82 kg ====
| Quarterfinals | | Semifinals | | Final |
| Péter Dömök (HUN) | 1 |
| Erik Szilvássy (HUN) | 3 | Erik Szilvássy (HUN) | 4 |
| Mihail Bradu (MDA) | 9^{F} | Mihail Bradu (MDA) | 3 |
| Miklós Királyházi (HUN) | 1 | | | Erik Szilvássy (HUN) | 3 |
| Spencer Woods (USA) | 10 | | | Gela Bolkvadze (GEO) | 1 |
| Ashkan Saadati (IRI) | 3 | Spencer Woods (USA) | 0 |
| Gela Bolkvadze (GEO) | 3 | Gela Bolkvadze (GEO) | 9 |
| Karlo Kodrić (CRO) | 3 |

Bronze medals
Péter Dömök (HUN) | 0
Mihail Bradu (MDA) | 3
Karlo Kodrić (CRO) | 3^{F}
Spencer Woods (USA) | 0

==== Men's Greco-Roman 87 kg ====
| Final |
| Semen Novikov (BUL) | WO |
| Dávid Losonczi (HUN) |

Qualification
Gurami Khetsuriani (GEO) | 0
Aivengo Rikadze (GEO) | 10

Round of 16
Bachir Sid Azara (ALG) | 3
Carlos Muñoz (COL) | 1
Aivengo Rikadze (GEO) | 2
Semen Novikov (BUL) | 2
István Takács (HUN) | 7
Matej Mandić (CRO) | 2
Vendel Vitai (HUN) | 3
Norbert Sipka (SVK) | 1

Quarterfinals
Bachir Sid Azara (ALG) | 1
Semen Novikov (BUL) | 5
István Takács (HUN) | 8
Vendel Vitai (HUN) | 0

Semifinals
Semen Novikov (BUL) | 4
István Takács (HUN) | 0

Qualification
Lee Seung-hwan (KOR) | 0
Dávid Losonczi (HUN) | 8

Round of 16
Shamil Ozhaev (KAZ) | WO
Ariel Alfonso (HON)
Ali Cengiz (TUR) | 4
Payton Jacobson (USA) | 1
Nursultan Tursynov (KAZ) | 0
Dávid Losonczi (HUN) | 8
Mohammad Hossein Mahmoodi (IRI) | WO
Tornike Dzamashvili (GEO)

Quarterfinals
Shamil Ozhaev (KAZ) | 3
Ali Cengiz (TUR) | 5
Dávid Losonczi (HUN) | 5
Mohammad Hossein Mahmoodi (IRI) | 3

Semifinals
Ali Cengiz (TUR) | 1
Dávid Losonczi (HUN) | 6^{F}

Repechage round 1
Lee Seung-hwan (KOR) | 2
Nursultan Tursynov (KAZ) | 8

Repechage round 2
Aivengo Rikadze (GEO)
Bachir Sid Azara (ALG) | WO
Nursultan Tursynov (KAZ) | 0
Mohammad Hossein Mahmoodi (IRI) | 8

Bronze medals
Bachir Sid Azara (ALG) | WO
István Takács (HUN)
Mohammad Hossein Mahmoodi (IRI) | 10
Ali Cengiz (TUR) | 4

==== Men's Greco-Roman 97 kg ====
Round of 16
Fadi Rouabah (ALG) | 3
Kevin Mejía (HON) | 6
Mohammad Hadi Saravi (IRI) | WO
~~Tamás Lévai (HUN)~~
Giorgi Melia (GEO) | 5
Mohamed Ali Gabr (EGY) | 1

Quarterfinals
Artur Omarov (CZE)
Kevin Mejía (HON) | WO
Alex Szőke (HUN) | 4
Shayan Habibzare (IRI) | 1
Joe Rau (USA) | 1
Mohammad Hadi Saravi (IRI) | 10
Giorgi Melia (GEO) | WO
Kim Seung-jun (KOR)

Semifinals
Kevin Mejía (HON)
Alex Szőke (HUN) | WO
Mohammad Hadi Saravi (IRI) | 6
Giorgi Melia (GEO) | 1

Final
Alex Szőke (HUN) | 1
Mohammad Hadi Saravi (IRI) | 3

Repechage round 1
~~Tamás Lévai (HUN)~~
Joe Rau (USA) | WO

Bronze medal match
Shayan Habibzare (IRI) | WO
Kevin Mejía (HON)
Joe Rau (USA) | 4
Giorgi Melia (GEO) | 11

==== Men's Greco-Roman 130 kg ====
Round of 16
Dáriusz Vitek (HUN) | 2
Yasmani Acosta (CHI) | 1
Abdellatif Mohamed (EGY) | 3
Adam Coon (USA) | 1
Amine Guennichi (TUN) | 3
Alimkhan Syzdykov (KAZ) | 2
~~Rıza Kayaalp (TUR)~~ | 3
Beka Kandelaki (AZE) | 0

Quarterfinals
~~Iakobi Kajaia (GEO)~~ | 10
Dáriusz Vitek (HUN) | 1
Abdellatif Mohamed (EGY) | 6
Lee Seung-chan (KOR) | 7
Alin Alexuc-Ciurariu (ROU) | 5
Amine Guennichi (TUN) | 0
~~Rıza Kayaalp (TUR)~~ | 0
Fardin Hedayati (IRI) | 4

Semifinals
~~Iakobi Kajaia (GEO)~~ | 5
Lee Seung-chan (KOR) | 1
Alin Alexuc-Ciurariu (ROU) | 0
Fardin Hedayati (IRI) | 8

Final
~~Iakobi Kajaia (GEO)~~ | 0
Fardin Hedayati (IRI) | 5

Bronze medals
Dáriusz Vitek (HUN) | 9
Lee Seung-chan (KOR) | 1
~~Rıza Kayaalp (TUR)~~
Alin Alexuc-Ciurariu (ROU) | WO

=== Women's freestyle ===
==== Women's freestyle 50 kg ====
Round of 16
Zhang Yu (CHN) | 4^{F}
Evin Demirhan Yavuz (TUR) | 0
Nadezhda Sokolova (AIN) | 10
Audrey Jimenez (USA) | 0
Madison Parks (CAN) | 10
Ibtissem Doudou (ALG) | 0
Vinesh Phogat (IND) | 10
Alisson Cardozo (COL) | 0

Quarterfinals
Dolgorjavyn Otgonjargal (MGL) | 6
Zhang Yu (CHN) | 3
Nadezhda Sokolova (AIN) | 7
Aktenge Keunimjaeva (UZB) | 5
Feng Ziqi (CHN) | 4^{F}
Madison Parks (CAN) | 0
Vinesh Phogat (IND) | 0
Zhu Jiang (CHN) | 5

Semifinals
Dolgorjavyn Otgonjargal (MGL) | 12
Nadezhda Sokolova (AIN) | 8
Feng Ziqi (CHN) | 4^{F}
Zhu Jiang (CHN) | 0

Final
Dolgorjavyn Otgonjargal (MGL) | 2
Feng Ziqi (CHN) | 12

Bronze medals
Zhang Yu (CHN) | WO
Nadezhda Sokolova (AIN)
Madison Parks (CAN) | 6
Zhu Jiang (CHN) | 10

==== Women's freestyle 53 kg ====
Quarterfinals
Katarzyna Krawczyk (POL) | 7
Milana Dadasheva (AIN) | 4
Antim Panghal (IND) | 10
Sakibjamal Esbosynova (UZB) | 0
Nataliia Klivchutska (UKR) | 2
Lucía Yépez (ECU) | 13
Zeynep Yetgil (TUR)
Jonna Malmgren (SWE) | WO

Semifinals
Katarzyna Krawczyk (POL) | 1
Antim Panghal (IND) | 3
Lucía Yépez (ECU)
Jonna Malmgren (SWE) | WO

Final
Antim Panghal (IND) | 0
Jonna Malmgren (SWE) | 4

Bronze medals
Sakibjamal Esbosynova (UZB) | 9
Katarzyna Krawczyk (POL) | 19
Zeynep Yetgil (TUR) | WO
Lucía Yépez (ECU)

==== Women's freestyle 55 kg ====
| Pos | Athlete | Pld | W | L | CP | TP | MDA | POL | AIN | KAZ |
|---|---|---|---|---|---|---|---|---|---|---|
| 1 | Mariana Drăguțan (MDA) | 3 | 2 | 1 | 11 | 15 | — | 4–11 | 2–6 Fall | 9–4 Fall |
| 2 | Jowita Wrzesień (POL) | 3 | 2 | 1 | 7 | 22 | 3–1 PO1 | — | 2–7 | 9–4 |
| 3 | Ekaterina Verbina (AIN) | 3 | 2 | 1 | 6 | 19 | 0–5 FA | 3–1 PO1 | — | 6–2 |
| 4 | Emma Tissina (KAZ) | 3 | 0 | 3 | 2 | 10 | 0–5 FA | 1–3 PO1 | 1–3 PO1 | — |

Source: UWW

| Pos | Athlete | Pld | W | L | CP | TP | USA | HUN | KAZ |
|---|---|---|---|---|---|---|---|---|---|
| 1 | Amanda Martinez (USA) | 2 | 2 | 0 | 9 | 18 | — | 6–0 Fall | 12–2 |
| 2 | Róza Szenttamási (HUN) | 2 | 1 | 1 | 3 | 6 | 0–5 FA | — | 6–6 |
| 3 | Marina Sedneva (KAZ) | 2 | 0 | 2 | 2 | 8 | 1–4 SU1 | 1–3 PO1 | — |

Source: UWW

Semifinals
Mariana Drăguțan (MDA) | 2
Róza Szenttamási (HUN) | 3^{F}
Amanda Martinez (USA) | 2
Jowita Wrzesień (POL) | 4^{F}

Final
Róza Szenttamási (HUN) | 2
Jowita Wrzesień (POL) | 5
Bronze medal
Mariana Drăguțan (MDA) | 2
Amanda Martinez (USA) | 11

==== Women's freestyle 57 kg ====
Round of 16
Chaimaa Aouissi (ALG) | 0
Anhelina Lysak (POL) | 2^{F}

Quarterfinals
Hong Kexin (CHN) | 10
Anhelina Lysak (POL) | 0
Giullia Penalber (BRA) | 11
Erika Bognár (HUN) | 1
Anastasia Nichita (MDA) | 5
Anshu Malik (IND) | 6
Luisa Valverde (ECU) | 1
Zhang Qi (CHN) | 11

Semifinals
Hong Kexin (CHN) | 14
Giullia Penalber (BRA) | 3
Anshu Malik (IND) | 2
Zhang Qi (CHN) | 1

Final
Hong Kexin (CHN) | 12
Anshu Malik (IND) | 1

Bronze medals
Anhelina Lysak (POL) | WO
Giullia Penalber (BRA)
Anastasia Nichita (MDA)
Zhang Qi (CHN) | WO

==== Women's freestyle 59 kg ====
| Pos | Athlete | Pld | W | L | CP | TP | UKR | KAZ | POL | KAZ | HUN |
|---|---|---|---|---|---|---|---|---|---|---|---|
| 1 | Alina Filipovych (UKR) | 4 | 4 | 0 | 14 | 37 | — | 14–3 | 6–2 | 6–0 | 11–0 |
| 2 | Diana Kayumova (KAZ) | 4 | 3 | 1 | 11 | 26 | 1–4 SU1 | — | 3–1 | 6–4 | 14–4 |
| 3 | Magdalena Głodek (POL) | 4 | 2 | 2 | 10 | 11 | 1–3 PO1 | 1–3 PO1 | — | 2–2 | 6–5 Fall |
| 4 | Irina Kuznetsova (KAZ) | 4 | 1 | 3 | 6 | 18 | 0–3 PO | 1–3 PO1 | 1–3 PO1 | — | 12–2 |
| 5 | Nikolett Szabó (HUN) | 4 | 0 | 4 | 2 | 11 | 0–4 SU | 1–4 SU1 | 0–5 FA | 1–4 SU1 | — |

Source: UWW

==== Women's freestyle 62 kg ====
Round of 16
Anna Shcherbakova (AIN) | 12
Pürevdorjiin Orkhon (MGL) | 8^{F}
Iryna Koliadenko (UKR) | 6
Alina Kasabieva (AIN) | 2
Natalia Kubaty (POL) | 0
Esther Kolawole (NGR) | 10
Luisa Niemesch (GER) | 1
Bilyana Dudova (BUL) | 2
Laís Nunes (BRA) | 5
Siwar Bousetta (TUN) | 4

Quarterfinals
Kayla Miracle (USA) | 10
Pürevdorjiin Orkhon (MGL) | 14
Iryna Koliadenko (UKR) | 13
Esther Kolawole (NGR) | 1
Grace Bullen (NOR) | 8
Bilyana Dudova (BUL) | 2
Laís Nunes (BRA) | 2
Ana Godinez (CAN) | 6

Semifinals
Pürevdorjiin Orkhon (MGL) | 4
Iryna Koliadenko (UKR) | 6
Grace Bullen (NOR) | 7
Ana Godinez (CAN) | 11

Final
Iryna Koliadenko (UKR)
Ana Godinez (CAN) | WO

Repechage round 1
Alina Kasabieva (AIN) | 2^{F}
Esther Kolawole (NGR) | 1

Bronze medal match
Alina Kasabieva (AIN) | 2
Pürevdorjiin Orkhon (MGL) | 8
Laís Nunes (BRA) | 2
Grace Bullen (NOR) | 4^{F}

==== Women's freestyle 65 kg ====
| Pos | Athlete | Pld | W | L | CP | TP | TUR | CAN | KAZ |
|---|---|---|---|---|---|---|---|---|---|
| 1 | Nesrin Baş (TUR) | 2 | 2 | 0 | 8 | 20 | — | 10–0 | 10–0 |
| 2 | Miki Rowbottom (CAN) | 2 | 1 | 1 | 5 | 0 | 0–4 SU | — | WO |
| 3 | Irina Kazyulina (KAZ) | 2 | 0 | 2 | 0 | 0 | 0–4 SU | 0–5 IN | — |

Source: UWW

| Pos | Athlete | Pld | W | L | CP | TP | UKR | HUN | AIN |
|---|---|---|---|---|---|---|---|---|---|
| 1 | Iryna Bondar (UKR) | 2 | 2 | 0 | 8 | 9 | — | 4–2 Fall | 5–4 |
| 2 | Enikő Elekes (HUN) | 2 | 1 | 1 | 3 | 6 | 0–5 FA | — | 4–2 |
| 3 | Dinara Kudaeva (AIN) | 2 | 0 | 2 | 2 | 6 | 1–3 PO1 | 1–3 PO1 | — |

Source: UWW

Semifinals
Nesrin Baş (TUR) | 10
Enikő Elekes (HUN) | 0
Iryna Bondar (UKR) | 4
Miki Rowbottom (CAN) | 3

Final
Nesrin Baş (TUR) | 4
Iryna Bondar (UKR) | 10
Bronze medal
Enikő Elekes (HUN)
Miki Rowbottom (CAN) | WO

==== Women's freestyle 68 kg ====
| Quarterfinals | | Semifinals | | Final |
| Soleymi Caraballo (VEN) | 8 |
| Kseniia Burakova (AIN) | 6 | Soleymi Caraballo (VEN) | 4 |
| Manola Skobelska (UKR) | 3 | Wiktoria Chołuj (POL) | 3 |
| Wiktoria Chołuj (POL) | 4 | | | Soleymi Caraballo (VEN) | 0 |
| Firuza Esenbaeva (UZB) | 0 | | | Buse Tosun Çavuşoğlu (TUR) | 2 |
| Buse Tosun Çavuşoğlu (TUR) | 10 | Buse Tosun Çavuşoğlu (TUR) | 4^{F} |
| Enkhsaikhany Delgermaa (MGL) | 6 | Enkhsaikhany Delgermaa (MGL) | 0 |
| Tayla Ford (NZL) | 0 |

Bronze medals
Kseniia Burakova (AIN) | 2
Wiktoria Chołuj (POL) | 7
Firuza Esenbaeva (UZB) | 4
Enkhsaikhany Delgermaa (MGL) | 13

==== Women's freestyle 72 kg ====
| Pos | Athlete | Pld | W | L | CP | TP | KAZ | HUN | FRA | SRB |
|---|---|---|---|---|---|---|---|---|---|---|
| 1 | Zhamila Bakbergenova (KAZ) | 3 | 3 | 0 | 11 | 15 | — | 5–0 | 4–1 | 6–0 Fall |
| 2 | Noémi Szabados (HUN) | 3 | 2 | 1 | 7 | 16 | 0–3 PO | — | 6–2 | 10–0 |
| 3 | Pauline Lecarpentier (FRA) | 3 | 1 | 2 | 6 | 14 | 1–3 PO1 | 1–3 PO1 | — | 11–0 |
| 4 | Fanni Nađ (SRB) | 3 | 0 | 3 | 0 | 0 | 0–5 FA | 0–4 SU | 0–4 SU | — |

Source: UWW

| Pos | Athlete | Pld | W | L | CP | TP | KAZ | UKR | HUN |
|---|---|---|---|---|---|---|---|---|---|
| 1 | Gulmaral Yerkebayeva (KAZ) | 2 | 2 | 0 | 7 | 13 | — | 3–1 | 10–0 |
| 2 | Iryna Zablotska (UKR) | 2 | 1 | 1 | 6 | 3 | 1–3 PO1 | — | 2–0 Fall |
| 3 | Viktória Felhő (HUN) | 2 | 0 | 2 | 0 | 0 | 0–4 SU | 0–5 FA | — |

Source: UWW

Semifinals
Zhamila Bakbergenova (KAZ) | 2
Iryna Zablotska (UKR) | 1
Gulmaral Yerkebayeva (KAZ) | 6
Noémi Szabados (HUN) | 8

Final
Zhamila Bakbergenova (KAZ) | 12
Noémi Szabados (HUN) | 11
Bronze medal
Iryna Zablotska (UKR) | 1
Gulmaral Yerkebayeva (KAZ) | 4

==== Women's freestyle 76 kg ====
| Pos | Athlete | Pld | W | L | CP | TP | COL | IND | ECU | CAN | TUN |
|---|---|---|---|---|---|---|---|---|---|---|---|
| 1 | Tatiana Rentería (COL) | 4 | 3 | 1 | 12 | 19 | — | 3–2 | 4–2 | 1–5 | 11–1 Fall |
| 2 | Reetika Hooda (IND) | 4 | 3 | 1 | 10 | 21 | 1–3 PO1 | — | 4–0 | 8–0 | 7–0 |
| 3 | Génesis Reasco (ECU) | 4 | 2 | 2 | 7 | 15 | 1–3 PO1 | 0–3 PO | — | 5–2 | 8–4 |
| 4 | Justina Di Stasio (CAN) | 4 | 2 | 2 | 7 | 13 | 3–1 PO1 | 0–3 PO | 1–3 PO1 | — | 6–0 |
| 5 | Zaineb Sghaier (TUN) | 4 | 0 | 4 | 1 | 5 | 0–5 FA | 0–3 PO | 1–3 PO1 | 0–3 PO | — |

Source: UWW
