= 2025 World Wrestling Championships – Men's Greco-Roman 67 kg =

Wrestling competitions

Men's Greco-Roman 67 kg at the 2025 World Championships
- Venue: Arena Zagreb
- Dates: 20–21 September 2025
- Competitors: 34 from 32 nations

Medalists
gold medal	Saeid Esmaeili	Iran
silver medal	Hasrat Jafarov	Azerbaijan
bronze medal	Daniial Agaev
bronze medal	Slavik Galstyan	Armenia

The men's Greco-Roman 67 kilograms is a competition featured at the 2025 World Wrestling Championships, and was held in Zagreb, Croatia on 20 and 21 September 2025.

This Greco-Roman wrestling competition consists of a single-elimination tournament, with a repechage used to determine the winner of two bronze medals. The two finalists face off for gold and silver medals. Each wrestler who loses to one of the two finalists moves into the repechage, culminating in a pair of bronze medal matches, featuring the semifinal losers each facing the remaining repechage opponent from their half of the bracket.

== Results ==
Legend

- F — Won by fall

=== Final ===
Semifinals		Final
Saeid Esmaeili (IRI)	10
Daniial Agaev (UWW)	0	Saeid Esmaeili (IRI)	2
Hasrat Jafarov (AZE)	3	Hasrat Jafarov (AZE)	1
Razzak Beishekeev (KGZ)	1

=== Top half ===
==== Section 1 ====
Round of 64
Andreas Vetsch (SUI)	1
Niklas Öhlén (SWE)	1

Round of 32
Saeid Esmaeili (IRI)	9
Sebastian Nađ (SRB)	0
Son Man-gwang (PRK)	4
Shermukhammad Sharibjanov (UZB)	5^{F}
Andreas Vetsch (SUI)	7
Osvaldo Yáñez (MEX)	1
Hleb Makaranka (UWW)	1
Håvard Jørgensen (NOR)	4

Round of 16
Saeid Esmaeili (IRI)	8
Shermukhammad Sharibjanov (UZB)	0
Andreas Vetsch (SUI)	1
Håvard Jørgensen (NOR)	2

Quarterfinals
Saeid Esmaeili (IRI)	8
Håvard Jørgensen (NOR)	0

==== Section 2 ====
Round of 64

Round of 32
Joni Khetsuriani (GEO)	2
Daniial Agaev (UWW)	5
Kristupas Šleiva (LTU)	7
Julián Horta (COL)	8
Kwon Min-seong (KOR)	2
Murat Fırat (TUR)	4
Maksym Liu (UKR)	0
Luis Orta (CUB)	10

Round of 16
Daniial Agaev (UWW)	9
Julián Horta (COL)	0
Murat Fırat (TUR)	1
Luis Orta (CUB)	2

Quarterfinals
Daniial Agaev (UWW)	4
Luis Orta (CUB)	2

=== Bottom half ===
==== Section 3 ====
Round of 64

Round of 32
Hasrat Jafarov (AZE)	9
Neiser Marimón (VEN)	0
Gjete Prenga (ALB)	0
Tsuchika Shimoyamada (AUS)	9
Gagik Snjoyan (FRA)	7
Anil Dahiya (IND)	0
Dinmukhamed Koshkar (KAZ)	1
Slavik Galstyan (ARM)	10

Round of 16
Hasrat Jafarov (AZE)	9
Tsuchika Shimoyamada (AUS)	0
Gagik Snjoyan (FRA)	3
Slavik Galstyan (ARM)	9

Quarterfinals
Hasrat Jafarov (AZE)	4
Slavik Galstyan (ARM)	3

==== Section 4 ====
Round of 64
Ding Libin (CHN)	9
Néstor Almanza (CHI)	0

Round of 32
Razzak Beishekeev (KGZ)	8
Kyotaro Sogabe (JPN)	0
Aker Al-Obaidi (AUT)	3
Ding Libin (CHN)	12
Alston Nutter (USA)	0
Dominik Etlinger (CRO)	10
Arslanbek Salimov (POL)	3
Valentin Petic (MDA)	6

Round of 16
Razzak Beishekeev (KGZ)	4
Ding Libin (CHN)	1
Dominik Etlinger (CRO)	10
Valentin Petic (MDA)	6

Quarterfinals
Razzak Beishekeev (KGZ)	10
Dominik Etlinger (CRO)	0

=== Repechage ===
Repechage round 2
Sebastian Nađ (SRB)	3
Shermukhammad Sharibjanov (UZB)	1
Neiser Marimón (VEN)	0
Tsuchika Shimoyamada (AUS)	11

Repechage round 3
Sebastian Nađ (SRB)	1
Håvard Jørgensen (NOR)	1
Tsuchika Shimoyamada (AUS)	4
Slavik Galstyan (ARM)	6

Bronze medals
Sebastian Nađ (SRB)	1
Daniial Agaev (UWW)	7
Slavik Galstyan (ARM)	15^{F}
Razzak Beishekeev (KGZ)	5

== Final standing ==
Rank	Athlete
1st place, gold medalist(s)	Saeid Esmaeili (IRI)
2nd place, silver medalist(s)	Hasrat Jafarov (AZE)
3rd place, bronze medalist(s)	Daniial Agaev (UWW)
3rd place, bronze medalist(s)	Slavik Galstyan (ARM)
5	Sebastian Nađ (SRB)
5	Razzak Beishekeev (KGZ)
7	Tsuchika Shimoyamada (AUS)
8	Ding Libin (CHN)
9	Luis Orta (CUB)
10	Dominik Etlinger (CRO)
11	Andreas Vetsch (SUI)
12	Håvard Jørgensen (NOR)
13	Shermukhammad Sharibjanov (UZB)
14	Valentin Petic (MDA)
15	Gagik Snjoyan (FRA)
16	Murat Fırat (TUR)
17	Julián Horta (COL)
18	Kristupas Šleiva (LTU)
19	Arslanbek Salimov (POL)
20	Aker Al-Obaidi (AUT)
21	Kwon Min-seong (KOR)
22	Joni Khetsuriani (GEO)
23	Niklas Öhlén (SWE)
24	Hleb Makaranka (UWW)
25	Osvaldo Yáñez (MEX)
26	Dinmukhamed Koshkar (KAZ)
27	Son Man-gwang (PRK)
28	Anil Dahiya (IND)
29	Kyotaro Sogabe (JPN)
30	Gjete Prenga (ALB)
31	Néstor Almanza (CHI)
32	Maksym Liu (UKR)
33	Alston Nutter (USA)
34	Neiser Marimón (VEN)
