= 2026 European Wrestling Championships – Men's Greco-Roman 67 kg =

Men's Greco-Roman 67 kg at the 2026 European Wrestling Championships
- Venue: Tirana Olympic Park
- Location: Tirana, Albania
- Dates: 21–22 April
- Competitors: 23 from 21 nations

Medalists
gold medal	Hasrat Jafarov	Azerbaijan
silver medal	Murat Fırat	Turkey
bronze medal	Diego Chkhikvadze	Georgia
bronze medal	Slavik Galstyan	Armenia

The men's Greco-Roman 67 kilograms competition at the 2026 European Wrestling Championships was held from 21 to 22 April 2026 at the Tirana Olympic Park in Tirana, Albania.

== Results ==
Legend

- F — Won by fall

=== Final ===
Final
Hasrat Jafarov (AZE)	7
Murat Fırat (TUR)	5

=== Top half ===
Round of 32
Abu Muslim Amaev (BUL)	8
Andrea Setti (ITA)	0
William Reenberg (DEN)	3
Dominik Etlinger (CRO)	7
Valentin Petic (MDA)	1
Hleb Makaranka (UWW)	5

Round of 16
Hasrat Jafarov (AZE)	5
Niklas Öhlén (SWE)	1
Abu Muslim Amaev (BUL)	9
Christopher Kraemer (GER)	3
Gjete Prenga (ALB)	2
Dominik Etlinger (CRO)	7
Hleb Makaranka (UWW)	1
Diego Chkhikvadze (GEO)	3

Quarterfinals
Hasrat Jafarov (AZE)	9^{F}
Abu Muslim Amaev (BUL)	0
Dominik Etlinger (CRO)	1
Diego Chkhikvadze (GEO)	6

Semifinals
Hasrat Jafarov (AZE)	4
Diego Chkhikvadze (GEO)	2

=== Bottom half ===
Round of 32
Aker Al-Obaidi (AUT)	3
Andreas Vetsch (SUI)	3
Håvard Jørgensen (NOR)	1
Murat Fırat (TUR)	3
Adomas Grigaliūnas (LTU)	8
Miguel Santos (POR)	0
Mateusz Szewczuk (POL)	0
Erzu Zakriev (UWW)	8

Round of 16
Slavik Galstyan (ARM)	9
Andreas Vetsch (SUI)	0
Murat Fırat (TUR)	4
Yanis Nifri (FRA)	1
Oleksandr Hrushyn (UKR)	8
Adomas Grigaliūnas (LTU)	0
Erzu Zakriev (UWW)	9
Sebastian Nađ (SRB)	0

Quarterfinals
Slavik Galstyan (ARM)	0
Murat Fırat (TUR)	5
Oleksandr Hrushyn (UKR)	7
Erzu Zakriev (UWW)	1

Semifinals
Murat Fırat (TUR)	4
Oleksandr Hrushyn (UKR)	0

=== Repechage ===
Repechage round 1
Håvard Jørgensen (NOR)	3
Yanis Nifri (FRA)	6

Repechage round 2
Niklas Öhlén (SWE)	3
Abu Muslim Amaev (BUL)	1
Yanis Nifri (FRA)	2
Slavik Galstyan (ARM)	5

Bronze medal matches
Niklas Öhlén (SWE)	1
Diego Chkhikvadze (GEO)	3
Slavik Galstyan (ARM)	5
Oleksandr Hrushyn (UKR)	3

== Final standing ==
Rank	Wrestler
1st place, gold medalist(s)	Hasrat Jafarov (AZE)
2nd place, silver medalist(s)	Murat Fırat (TUR)
3rd place, bronze medalist(s)	Diego Chkhikvadze (GEO)
3rd place, bronze medalist(s)	Slavik Galstyan (ARM)
5	Niklas Öhlén (SWE)
5	Oleksandr Hrushyn (UKR)
7	Erzu Zakriev (UWW)
8	Abu Muslim Amaev (BUL)
9	Dominik Etlinger (CRO)
10	Yanis Nifri (FRA)
11	Adomas Grigaliūnas (LTU)
12	Hleb Makaranka (UWW)
13	Andreas Vetsch (SUI)
14	Håvard Jørgensen (NOR)
15	Aker Al-Obaidi (AUT)
16	William Reenberg (DEN)
17	Christopher Kraemer (GER)
18	Gjete Prenga (ALB)
19	Valentin Petic (MDA)
20	Andrea Setti (ITA)
21	Miguel Santos (POR)
22	Mateusz Szewczuk (POL)
23	Sebastian Nađ (SRB)
