= 2026 World Wrestling Championships – Men's Greco-Roman 67 kg =

Wrestling competitions

Men's Greco-Roman 67 kg at the 2026 World Championships
- Venue: Barys Arena
- Dates: 26–27 October 2026
- Competitors: 31 from 31 nations

Medalists
gold medal	Saeid Esmaeili	Iran
silver medal	Aytjan Khalmakhanov	Uzbekistan
bronze medal	Bagdat Sabaz	Kazakhstan
bronze medal	Luis Orta	Cuba

The men's Greco-Roman 67 kilograms is a competition featured at the 2026 World Wrestling Championships, and was held in Astana, Kazakhstan on 26 and 27 October 2026.

This Greco-Roman wrestling competition consists of a single-elimination tournament, with a repechage used to determine the winner of two bronze medals. The two finalists face off for gold and silver medals. Each wrestler who loses to one of the two finalists moves into the repechage, culminating in a pair of bronze medal matches, featuring the semifinal losers each facing the remaining repechage opponent from their half of the bracket.

== Results ==
Legend

- D — Disqualified
- F — Won by fall
- WO — Won by walkover

=== Final ===
Final
Saeid Esmaeili (IRI)	8^{F}
Aytjan Khalmakhanov (UZB)	0

=== Top half ===
Round of 32
Oleksandr Hrushyn (UKR)	WO
~~Yassine Faraj (MAR)~~
Chung Han-jae (KOR)	6
Sachin Sahrawat (IND)	5
Christopher Kraemer (GER)	6
Daniial Agaev (RUS)	7
Razzak Beishekeev (KGZ)	4
Bagdat Sabaz (KAZ)	8
Abu Muslim Amaev (BUL)	10
Son Man-gwang (PRK)	5
Aker Al-Obaidi (AUT)	1
Jin Xinxin (CHN)	6
Ilias Laaouina (NED)	0
Saeid Esmaeili (IRI)	10

Round of 16
Hasrat Jafarov (AZE)	7
Oleksandr Hrushyn (UKR)	1
Chung Han-jae (KOR)	6
Daniial Agaev (RUS)	3
Bagdat Sabaz (KAZ)	7
Abu Muslim Amaev (BUL)	5
Jin Xinxin (CHN)	0
Saeid Esmaeili (IRI)	11

Quarterfinals
Hasrat Jafarov (AZE)	6
Chung Han-jae (KOR)	1
Bagdat Sabaz (KAZ)	2
Saeid Esmaeili (IRI)	7

Semifinals
Hasrat Jafarov (AZE)	1
Saeid Esmaeili (IRI)	1

=== Bottom half ===
Round of 32
Tsuchika Shimoyamada (AUS)	10
Amer Al-Hammadi (QAT)	0^{D}
Aytjan Khalmakhanov (UZB)	12
Otto Black (USA)	1
Luis Orta (CUB)	9
Fayssal Benfredj (ALG)	0
Katsuaki Endo (JPN)	0
Diego Chkhikvadze (GEO)	9
Murat Fırat (TUR)	1
Håvard Jørgensen (NOR)	6
Andreas Vetsch (SUI)	5
Shokhin Kholnazarov (TJK)	3
Niklas Öhlén (SWE)	1
Valentin Petic (MDA)	3
Gagik Snjoyan (FRA)	1
Slavik Galstyan (ARM)	5

Round of 16
Tsuchika Shimoyamada (AUS)	0
Aytjan Khalmakhanov (UZB)	2^{F}
Luis Orta (CUB)	12
Diego Chkhikvadze (GEO)	8
Håvard Jørgensen (NOR)	3
Andreas Vetsch (SUI)	1
Valentin Petic (MDA)	0
Slavik Galstyan (ARM)	10

Quarterfinals
Aytjan Khalmakhanov (UZB)	6
Luis Orta (CUB)	4
Håvard Jørgensen (NOR)	2
Slavik Galstyan (ARM)	3

Semifinals
Aytjan Khalmakhanov (UZB)	4
Slavik Galstyan (ARM)	0

=== Repechage ===
Repechage round 1
Ilias Laaouina (NED)	1
Jin Xinxin (CHN)	3
Otto Black (USA)	9
Tsuchika Shimoyamada (AUS)	0

Repechage round 2
Jin Xinxin (CHN)	5
Bagdat Sabaz (KAZ)	8
Otto Black (USA)	4
Luis Orta (CUB)	7

Bronze medals
Bagdat Sabaz (KAZ)	8
Hasrat Jafarov (AZE)	5
Luis Orta (CUB)	10
Slavik Galstyan (ARM)	6

== Final standing ==
Rank	Athlete
1st place, gold medalist(s)	Saeid Esmaeili (IRI)
2nd place, silver medalist(s)	Aytjan Khalmakhanov (UZB)
3rd place, bronze medalist(s)	Bagdat Sabaz (KAZ)
3rd place, bronze medalist(s)	Luis Orta (CUB)
5	Hasrat Jafarov (AZE)
5	Slavik Galstyan (ARM)
7	Jin Xinxin (CHN)
8	Chung Han-jae (KOR)
9	Håvard Jørgensen (NOR)
10	Otto Black (USA)
11	Oleksandr Hrushyn (UKR)
12	Diego Chkhikvadze (GEO)
13	Tsuchika Shimoyamada (AUS)
14	Abu Muslim Amaev (BUL)
15	Daniial Agaev (RUS)
16	Andreas Vetsch (SUI)
17	Valentin Petic (MDA)
18	Christopher Kraemer (GER)
19	Sachin Sahrawat (IND)
20	Son Man-gwang (PRK)
21	Razzak Beishekeev (KGZ)
22	Shokhin Kholnazarov (TJK)
23	Niklas Öhlén (SWE)
24	Gagik Snjoyan (FRA)
25	Murat Fırat (TUR)
26	Aker Al-Obaidi (AUT)
27	Ilias Laaouina (NED)
28	Fayssal Benfredj (ALG)
29	Katsuaki Endo (JPN)
—	Yassine Faraj (MAR)
—	Amer Al-Hammadi (QAT)
