= 2024 European Wrestling Championships – Men's Greco-Roman 67 kg =

Wrestling competition

Men's Greco-Roman 67 kg at the 2024 European Wrestling Championships
- Venue: Polyvalent Hall
- Location: Bucharest, Romania
- Dates: 13-14 February
- Competitors: 22

Medalists
gold medal	Hasrat Jafarov	Azerbaijan
silver medal	Ruslan Bichurin	Individual Neutral Athletes
bronze medal	Abu Muslim Amaev	Bulgaria
bronze medal	Murat Fırat	Turkey

The Men's Greco-Roman 67 kg is a competition featured at the 2024 European Wrestling Championships, and was held in Bucharest, Romania on February 13 and 14.

== Results ==
Legend

- F — Won by fall

=== Final ===
Final
Hasrat Jafarov (AZE)	8
Ruslan Bichurin (AIN)	5

=== Top half ===
Round of 32
Shon Nadorgin (ISR)	5
Abu Muslim Amaev (BUL)	16
Artur Politaiev (UKR)	9^{F}
Dávid Mányik (HUN)	0
Andrea Setti (ITA)	0
Diego Chkhikvadze (GEO)	9

Round of 16
Hasrat Jafarov (AZE)	6
Sebastian Nađ (SRB)	1
Abu Muslim Amaev (BUL)	9
Kristupas Šleiva (LTU)	0
Morten Thoresen (NOR)	1
Artur Politaiev (UKR)	1
Diego Chkhikvadze (GEO)	2
Mihai Mihuț (ROU)	1

Quarterfinals
Hasrat Jafarov (AZE)	13
Abu Muslim Amaev (BUL)	4
Morten Thoresen (NOR)	2
Diego Chkhikvadze (GEO)	1

Semifinals
Hasrat Jafarov (AZE)	7
Morten Thoresen (NOR)	1

=== Bottom half ===
Round of 32
Maksim Nehoda (AIN)	2
Valentin Petic (MDA)	3
Mateusz Bernatek (POL)	1
Murat Fırat (TUR)	5
Ruslan Bichurin (AIN)	9
Nestori Mannila (FIN)	0

Round of 16
Gagik Snjoyan (FRA)	6
Valentin Petic (MDA)	4
Murat Fırat (TUR)	10
Gjeta Prenga (ALB)	0
William Reenberg (DEN)	1
Ruslan Bichurin (AIN)	5
Niklas Öhlén (SWE)	4
Slavik Galstyan (ARM)	12

Quarterfinals
Gagik Snjoyan (FRA)	1
Murat Fırat (TUR)	1
Ruslan Bichurin (AIN)	9
Slavik Galstyan (ARM)	0

Semifinals
Murat Fırat (TUR)	4
Ruslan Bichurin (AIN)	5

=== Repechage ===
Repechage round 1
Nestori Mannila (FIN)	8
William Reenberg (DEN)	0

Repechage round 2
Sebastian Nađ (SRB)	1
Abu Muslim Amaev (BUL)	1
Nestori Mannila (FIN)	2
Slavik Galstyan (ARM)	6

Bronze medal match
Abu Muslim Amaev (BUL)	8
Morten Thoresen (NOR)	5
Slavik Galstyan (ARM)	4
Murat Fırat (TUR)	5

== Final standing ==
Rank	Athlete
1st place, gold medalist(s)	Hasrat Jafarov (AZE)
2nd place, silver medalist(s)	Ruslan Bichurin (AIN)
3rd place, bronze medalist(s)	Abu Muslim Amaev (BUL)
3rd place, bronze medalist(s)	Murat Fırat (TUR)
5	Morten Thoresen (NOR)
5	Slavik Galstyan (ARM)
7	Diego Chkhikvadze (GEO)
8	Artur Politaiev (UKR)
9	Nestori Mannila (FIN)
10	Gagik Snjoyan (FRA)
11	Valentin Petic (MDA)
12	Sebastian Nađ (SRB)
13	Shon Nadorgin (ISR)
14	Niklas Öhlén (SWE)
15	Maksim Nehoda (AIN)
16	Mihai Mihuț (ROU)
17	Mateusz Bernatek (POL)
18	William Reenberg (DEN)
19	Kristupas Šleiva (LTU)
20	Dávid Mányik (HUN)
21	Andrea Setti (ITA)
22	Gjeta Prenga (ALB)
