= 2022 World Wrestling Championships – Men's Greco-Roman 67 kg =

Wrestling competitions

Men's Greco-Roman 67 kg at the 2022 World Championships
- Venue: Štark Arena
- Dates: 11–12 September 2022
- Competitors: 30 from 30 nations

Medalists
| gold medal | Mate Nemeš | Serbia |
| silver medal | Mohammad Reza Geraei | Iran |
| bronze medal | Amantur Ismailov | Kyrgyzstan |
| bronze medal | Hasrat Jafarov | Azerbaijan |

The men's Greco-Roman 67 kilograms was a competition at the 2022 World Wrestling Championships. It was held in Belgrade, Serbia on 11 and 12 September 2022.

This Greco-Roman wrestling competition consisted of a single-elimination tournament, with a repechage used to determine the winner of two bronze medals. The two finalists faced off for gold and silver medals. Each wrestler who lost to one of the two finalists moved into the repechage, culminating in a pair of bronze-medal matches featuring the losing semifinalists each facing the remaining repechage opponent from their half of the bracket.

== Results ==
Legend

- R — Retired
- WO — Won by walkover

=== Final ===
| Final |
| Mohammad Reza Geraei (IRI) | 4 |
| Mate Nemeš (SRB) | 5 |

=== Top half ===
Round of 32
István Váncza (HUN) | 7
Amantur Ismailov (KGZ) | 9
Mihai Mihuț (ROU) | 5
Kenedy Pedrosa (BRA) | 3
Néstor Almanza (CHI) | 1^{R}
Ryu Han-su (KOR) | 7
Mohamed Ibrahim El-Sayed (EGY) | 2
Abror Atabaev (UZB) | 4
Joni Khetsuriani (GEO) | 11
Andreas Vetsch (SUI) | 0
Norva Bukasa (COD) | 0
Alejandro Sancho (USA) | 9
Slavik Galstyan (ARM) | 7
Parviz Nasibov (UKR) | 7

Round of 16
Mohammad Reza Geraei (IRI) | 9
Amantur Ismailov (KGZ) | 0
Mihai Mihuț (ROU) | 1
Ryu Han-su (KOR) | 4
Abror Atabaev (UZB) | 1
Joni Khetsuriani (GEO) | 4
Alejandro Sancho (USA) | 0
Parviz Nasibov (UKR) | 5

Quarterfinals
Mohammad Reza Geraei (IRI) | 5
Ryu Han-su (KOR) | 1^{R}
Joni Khetsuriani (GEO) | 7
Parviz Nasibov (UKR) | 0

Semifinals
Mohammad Reza Geraei (IRI) | 8
Joni Khetsuriani (GEO) | 0

=== Bottom half ===
Round of 32
Hasrat Jafarov (AZE) | WO
~~Diego Martínez (MEX)~~
Katsuaki Endo (JPN) | 5
Donior Islamov (MDA) | 1
Husiyuetu (CHN) | 8
Ishak Ghaiou (ALG) | 0
Julián Horta (COL) | 0
Morten Thoresen (NOR) | 4
Mateusz Bernatek (POL) | 9
Pedro Caldas (POR) | 0
Dinmukhamed Koshkar (KAZ) | 5
Mamadassa Sylla (FRA) | 9
Mate Nemeš (SRB) | 9
Ashu Bazard (IND) | 0

Round of 16
Hasrat Jafarov (AZE) | 9
Katsuaki Endo (JPN) | 0
Husiyuetu (CHN) | 3
Morten Thoresen (NOR) | 1
Mateusz Bernatek (POL) | 6
Mamadassa Sylla (FRA) | 3
Mate Nemeš (SRB) | 10
Murat Fırat (TUR) | 2

Quarterfinals
Hasrat Jafarov (AZE) | 7
Husiyuetu (CHN) | 0
Mateusz Bernatek (POL) | 1
Mate Nemeš (SRB) | 3

Semifinals
Hasrat Jafarov (AZE) | 2
Mate Nemeš (SRB) | 5

=== Repechage ===
Repechage round 1
Ashu Bazard (IND) | 0
Murat Fırat (TUR) | 8

Repechage round 2
Amantur Ismailov (KGZ) | WO
Ryu Han-su (KOR)
Murat Fırat (TUR) | 9
Mateusz Bernatek (POL) | 2

Bronze medals
Amantur Ismailov (KGZ) | 17
Joni Khetsuriani (GEO) | 8
Murat Fırat (TUR) | 2
Hasrat Jafarov (AZE) | 8

== Final standing ==
| Rank | Athlete |
|---|---|
| 1st place, gold medalist(s) | Mate Nemeš (SRB) |
| 2nd place, silver medalist(s) | Mohammad Reza Geraei (IRI) |
| 3rd place, bronze medalist(s) | Amantur Ismailov (KGZ) |
| 3rd place, bronze medalist(s) | Hasrat Jafarov (AZE) |
| 5 | Joni Khetsuriani (GEO) |
| 5 | Murat Fırat (TUR) |
| 7 | Mateusz Bernatek (POL) |
| 8 | Ryu Han-su (KOR) |
| 9 | Husiyuetu (CHN) |
| 10 | Parviz Nasibov (UKR) |
| 11 | Alejandro Sancho (USA) |
| 12 | Mamadassa Sylla (FRA) |
| 13 | Mihai Mihuț (ROU) |
| 14 | Morten Thoresen (NOR) |
| 15 | Abror Atabaev (UZB) |
| 16 | Katsuaki Endo (JPN) |
| 17 | Slavik Galstyan (ARM) |
| 18 | István Váncza (HUN) |
| 19 | Dinmukhamed Koshkar (KAZ) |
| 20 | Kenedy Pedrosa (BRA) |
| 21 | Mohamed Ibrahim El-Sayed (EGY) |
| 22 | Donior Islamov (MDA) |
| 23 | Néstor Almanza (CHI) |
| 24 | Julián Horta (COL) |
| 25 | Ishak Ghaiou (ALG) |
| 26 | Norva Bukasa (COD) |
| 27 | Pedro Caldas (POR) |
| 28 | Andreas Vetsch (SUI) |
| 29 | Ashu Bazard (IND) |
| — | Diego Martínez (MEX) |
