= 2025 European Wrestling Championships – Men's Greco-Roman 67 kg =

Wrestling competition

Men's Greco-Roman 67 kg at the 2025 European Wrestling Championships
- Venue: X-Bionic Sphere
- Location: Bratislava, Slovakia
- Dates: 12-13 April
- Competitors: 16

Medalists
gold medal	Hasrat Jafarov	Azerbaijan
silver medal	Abu Muslim Amaev	Bulgaria
bronze medal	Arslanbek Salimov	Poland
bronze medal	Joni Khetsuriani	Georgia

The men's Greco-Roman 67 kg is a competition featured at the 2025 European Wrestling Championships, and was held in Bratislava, Slovakia on April 12 and 13.

== Results ==
Legend

- F — Won by fall

=== Main bracket ===
Round of 16
Valentin Petic (MDA)	0
Ruslan Bichurin (UWW)	5
Arslanbek Salimov (POL)	6
Niklas Öhlén (SWE)	0
Abu Muslim Amaev (BUL)	4
Yanis Nifri (FRA)	0
Sebastian Nađ (SRB)	3
Håvard Jørgensen (NOR)	1
Slavik Galstyan (ARM)	9
Oleksandr Hrushyn (UKR)	0
Murat Fırat (TUR)	9
Gjete Prenga (ALB)	1
Joni Khetsuriani (GEO)	9
Dominik Etlinger (CRO)	0
Andreas Vetsch (SUI)	0
Hasrat Jafarov (AZE)	8

Quarterfinals
Ruslan Bichurin (UWW)	2
Arslanbek Salimov (POL)	3
Abu Muslim Amaev (BUL)	7
Sebastian Nađ (SRB)	1
Slavik Galstyan (ARM)	1
Murat Fırat (TUR)	3
Joni Khetsuriani (GEO)	1
Hasrat Jafarov (AZE)	4

Semifinals
Arslanbek Salimov (POL)	3
Abu Muslim Amaev (BUL)	4
Murat Fırat (TUR)	0
Hasrat Jafarov (AZE)	8

Final
Abu Muslim Amaev (BUL)	1
Hasrat Jafarov (AZE)	7

=== Repechage ===
Repechage round 1
Yanis Nifri (FRA)	8
Sebastian Nađ (SRB)	2
Andreas Vetsch (SUI)	2
Joni Khetsuriani (GEO)	4

Bronze medal match
Yanis Nifri (FRA)	0
Arslanbek Salimov (POL)	5
Joni Khetsuriani (GEO)	3
Murat Fırat (TUR)	1

== Final standing ==
Rank	Athlete
1st place, gold medalist(s)	Hasrat Jafarov (AZE)
2nd place, silver medalist(s)	Abu Muslim Amaev (BUL)
3rd place, bronze medalist(s)	Arslanbek Salimov (POL)
3rd place, bronze medalist(s)	Joni Khetsuriani (GEO)
5	Yanis Nifri (FRA)
5	Murat Fırat (TUR)
7	Slavik Galstyan (ARM)
8	Sebastian Nađ (SRB)
9	Ruslan Bichurin (UWW)
10	Andreas Vetsch (SUI)
11	Håvard Jørgensen (NOR)
12	Gjete Prenga (ALB)
13	Valentin Petic (MDA)
14	Niklas Öhlén (SWE)
15	Oleksandr Hrushyn (UKR)
16	Dominik Etlinger (CRO)
