= 2023 European Wrestling Championships – Men's Greco-Roman 67 kg =

Wrestling competition

Men's Greco-Roman 67 kg at the 2023 European Wrestling Championships
- Venue: Arena Zagreb
- Location: Zagreb, Croatia
- Dates: 22-23 April
- Competitors: 21

Medalists
gold medal	Hasrat Jafarov	Azerbaijan
silver medal	Joni Khetsuriani	Georgia
bronze medal	Parviz Nasibov	Ukraine
bronze medal	Håvard Jørgensen	Norway

The Men's Greco-Roman 67 kg is a competition featured at the 2023 European Wrestling Championships, and will held in Zagreb, Croatia on April 22 and 23.

== Results ==
Legend

- F — Won by fall

=== Final ===
Final
Joni Khetsuriani (GEO)	2
Hasrat Jafarov (AZE)	3

=== Top half ===
Round of 32
Roman Pacurkowski (POL)	0
Parviz Nasibov (UKR)	2
Shon Nadorgin (ISR)	4
Donior Islamov (MDA)	12
Slavik Galstyan (ARM)	2
Tigran Galustyan (FRA)	3

Round of 16
Joni Khetsuriani (GEO)	5
Zaur Kabaloev (ITA)	2
Parviz Nasibov (UKR)	9
Luka Ivančić (CRO)	0
Elmer Mattila (FIN)	2
Donior Islamov (MDA)	8
Tigran Galustyan (FRA)	0
Mihai Mihuț (ROU)	2

Quarterfinals
Joni Khetsuriani (GEO)	8
Parviz Nasibov (UKR)	2
Donior Islamov (MDA)	3
Mihai Mihuț (ROU)	11

Semifinals
Joni Khetsuriani (GEO)	10
Mihai Mihuț (ROU)	1

=== Bottom half ===
Round of 32
Ádám Pohilec (HUN)	2
Niklas Öhlén (SWE)	11
Sebastian Nađ (SRB)	4
Håvard Jørgensen (NOR)	4

Round of 16
Murat Fırat (TUR)	9
Andreas Vetsch (SUI)	1
Niklas Öhlén (SWE)	4
Ivo Iliev (BUL)	5
Witalis Lazovski (GER)	1
Håvard Jørgensen (NOR)	3
Pedro Caldas (POR)	1
Hasrat Jafarov (AZE)	2^{F}

Quarterfinals
Murat Fırat (TUR)	5
Ivo Iliev (BUL)	3
Håvard Jørgensen (NOR)	1
Hasrat Jafarov (AZE)	7

Semifinals
Murat Fırat (TUR)	1
Hasrat Jafarov (AZE)	7

Repechage round 2
Zaur Kabaloev (ITA)	2
Parviz Nasibov (UKR)	2
Pedro Caldas (POR)	0
Håvard Jørgensen (NOR)	8

Bronze medal match
Parviz Nasibov (UKR)	1
Mihai Mihuț (ROU)	1
Håvard Jørgensen (NOR)	3
Murat Fırat (TUR)	2

== Final standing ==
Rank	Athlete
1st place, gold medalist(s)	Hasrat Jafarov (AZE)
2nd place, silver medalist(s)	Joni Khetsuriani (GEO)
3rd place, bronze medalist(s)	Parviz Nasibov (UKR)
3rd place, bronze medalist(s)	Håvard Jørgensen (NOR)
5	Murat Fırat (TUR)
5	Mihai Mihuț (ROU)
7	Donior Islamov (MDA)
8	Niklas Öhlén (SWE)
9	Ivo Iliev (BUL)
10	Tigran Galustyan (FRA)
11	Zaur Kabaloev (ITA)
12	Sebastian Nađ (SRB)
13	Shon Nadorgin (ISR)
14	Slavik Galstyan (ARM)
15	Elmer Mattila (FIN)
16	Ádám Pohilec (HUN)
17	Witalis Lazovski (GER)
18	Andreas Vetsch (SUI)
19	Pedro Caldas (POR)
20	Roman Pacurkowski (POL)
21	Luka Ivančić (CRO)
