= 2022 U23 World Wrestling Championships – Men's Greco-Roman 72 kg =

Wrestling competitions

Men's Greco-Roman 72 kg at the 2022 U23 World Championships
- Venue: Pontevedra Municipal Sports Hall
- Dates: 18–19 October
- Competitors: 24 from 24 nations

Medalists
gold medal	Gurban Gurbanov	Azerbaijan
silver medal	Pavel Puklavec	Croatia
bronze medal	Vikas Dalal	India
bronze medal	Amir Abdi	Iran

The men's Greco-Roman 72 kilograms is a competition featured at the 2022 U23 World Wrestling Championships held in Pontevedra, Spain, on 18 and 19 October 2022. The qualification rounds were held on 18 October, while medal matches were held on the 2nd day of the competition. A total of 24 wrestlers competed in this event, which was limited to athletes whose body weight was less than 72 kilograms.

This Greco-Roman wrestling competition consists of a single-elimination tournament, with a repechage used to determine the winner of two bronze medals. The two finalists face off for gold and silver medals. Each wrestler who loses to one of the two finalists moves into the repechage, culminating in a pair of bronze medal matches featuring the semifinal losers, each facing the remaining repechage opponent from their half of the bracket.

== Results ==
Legend

- F — Won by fall
- R — Retired

=== Final ===
Final
Pavel Puklavec (CRO)	2
Gurban Gurbanov (AZE)	8

=== Top half ===
Round of 32
Marcos Sánchez-Silva (ESP)	3
Miru Olsson (SWE)	2
Eimantas Vilimas (LTU)	6^{R}
Adilkhan Nurlanbekov (KGZ)	7
Muhammetnazar Jumaýew (TKM)	6
Yerassyl Nurbossynov (KAZ)	10
Giorgos Sotiriadis (GRE)	9
Alejandro Varela (GUA)	0

Round of 16
Kamil Czarnecki (POL)	3
Marcos Sánchez-Silva (ESP)	5
Adilkhan Nurlanbekov (KGZ)	0
Vikas Dalal (IND)	11
Daigo Kobayashi (JPN)	8
Yerassyl Nurbossynov (KAZ)	5
Giorgos Sotiriadis (GRE)	2
Pavel Puklavec (CRO)	5

Quarterfinals
Marcos Sánchez-Silva (ESP)	1
Vikas Dalal (IND)	10
Daigo Kobayashi (JPN)	5
Pavel Puklavec (CRO)	11

Semifinals
Vikas Dalal (IND)	0
Pavel Puklavec (CRO)	9

=== Bottom half ===
Round of 32
Irfan Mirzoiev (UKR)	9
Furkan Zırın (TUR)	1
Valentin Petic (MDA)	3
Samuel Bellscheidt (GER)	1
Gurban Gurbanov (AZE)	7
Yanis Nifri (FRA)	2
Shant Khachatryan (ARM)	8
Giorgi Chkhikvadze (GEO)	5

Round of 16
Benji Peak (USA)	0
Irfan Mirzoiev (UKR)	9
Valentin Petic (MDA)	11
Edsson Olmos (MEX)	0
Randel Uibo (EST)	0
Gurban Gurbanov (AZE)	8
Shant Khachatryan (ARM)	0
Amir Abdi (IRI)	6

Quarterfinals
Irfan Mirzoiev (UKR)	6
Valentin Petic (MDA)	1
Gurban Gurbanov (AZE)	1
Amir Abdi (IRI)	1

Semifinals
Irfan Mirzoiev (UKR)	1
Gurban Gurbanov (AZE)	7

=== Repechage ===
Repechage round 1
Yanis Nifri (FRA)	6
Randel Uibo (EST)	1

Repechage round 2
Giorgos Sotiriadis (GRE)	1
Daigo Kobayashi (JPN)	6
Yanis Nifri (FRA)	0
Amir Abdi (IRI)	8

Bronze medals
Daigo Kobayashi (JPN)	0
Vikas Dalal (IND)	6
Amir Abdi (IRI)	3
Irfan Mirzoiev (UKR)	1

== Final standing ==
Rank	Athlete
1st place, gold medalist(s)	Gurban Gurbanov (AZE)
2nd place, silver medalist(s)	Pavel Puklavec (CRO)
3rd place, bronze medalist(s)	Vikas Dalal (IND)
3rd place, bronze medalist(s)	Amir Abdi (IRI)
5	Daigo Kobayashi (JPN)
5	Irfan Mirzoiev (UKR)
7	Valentin Petic (MDA)
8	Marcos Sánchez-Silva (ESP)
9	Giorgos Sotiriadis (GRE)
10	Adilkhan Nurlanbekov (KGZ)
11	Yerassyl Nurbossynov (KAZ)
12	Yanis Nifri (FRA)
13	Shant Khachatryan (ARM)
14	Muhammetnazar Jumaýew (TKM)
15	Giorgi Chkhikvadze (GEO)
16	Kamil Czarnecki (POL)
17	Miru Olsson (SWE)
18	Samuel Bellscheidt (GER)
19	Furkan Zırın (TUR)
20	Randel Uibo (EST)
21	Eimantas Vilimas (LTU)
22	Alejandro Varela (GUA)
23	Benji Peak (USA)
24	Edsson Olmos (MEX)
