= Saeid Esmaeili =

Iranian Greco-Roman wrestler (born 2003)

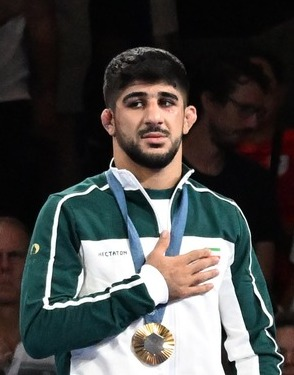
- Esmaeili at the 2024 Summer Olympics

Personal information
- Native name: سعید اسماعیلی لیوسی
- Full name: Saeid Esmaeili Leivesi
- Nationality: Persian
- Born: 15 July 2003 (age 23) Dezful, Iran

Sport
- Sport: Greco-Roman wrestling
- Weight class: 67 kg
Medal record
Men's Greco-Roman wrestling
Event	1st	2nd	3rd
Olympics Games	1	0	0
World Championships	2	0	0
Asian Championships	2	0	0
World U20 Championships	1	1	0
Islamic Solidarity Games	1	0	0
Other	5	0	0
Total	12	1	0
Olympic Games
Gold medal – first place	2024 Paris	67 kg
World Championships
Gold medal – first place	2025 Zagreb	67 kg
Gold medal – first place	2026 Astana	67 kg
Asian Championships
Gold medal – first place	2024 Bishkek	67 kg
Gold medal – first place	2025 Amman	67 kg
Islamic Solidarity Games
Gold medal – first place	2025 Riyadh	67 kg
U20 World Championships
Silver medal – second place	2021 Ufa	60 kg
Gold medal – first place	2022 Sofia	60 kg
U17 World Championships
Gold medal – first place	2019 Sofia	51 kg
U17 Asian Championships
Gold medal – first place	2019 Nur-Sultan	51 kg
Dan Kolov & Nikola Petrov Tournament
Gold medal – first place	2022 Veliko Tarnovo	60 kg
Vehbi Emre & Hamit Kaplan Tournament
Gold medal – first place	2023 Istanbul	67 kg
Gold medal – first place	2024 Antalya	67 kg

Saeid Esmaeili Leivesi (Persian: سعید اسماعیلی لیوسی; born 15 July 2003), commonly known as Saeid Esmaeili, is an Iranian Greco-Roman wrestler. He won the men's 67 kg gold medal at the 2024 Summer Olympics and consecutive 67 kg titles at the 2025 and 2026 World Wrestling Championships. He also won the 67 kg gold medal at the 2024 and 2025 Asian Wrestling Championships and the 2025 Islamic Solidarity Games.

== Early life and training ==
Esmaeili was born in Dezful, Khuzestan province, Iran. In a 2022 interview with the Iranian newspaper Hamshahri, he said he had started wrestling at age ten under the coaching of Hamzeh Arqash (also transliterated Arghash). He named fellow Iranian Greco-Roman wrestler Habib Akhlaghi as an influence on his wrestling style. His early coaches included Karim Kakahaji and Arqash.

In an interview after winning the 2022 World Junior Championships, Esmaeili described the financial difficulty of pursuing wrestling. He said his father was a labourer and that he had worked in construction with Arqash to help pay expenses. He also said the coach helped raise money for his travel and training. In a separate interview in 2024, Arqash recalled that he and Esmaeili had done construction work together and that the wrestlers at his club had at one stage trained on a tiled floor after he rented a space.

== Wrestling career ==
=== Cadet and junior competition (2019–2022) ===
Esmaeili won the Greco-Roman 51 kg gold medal at the 2019 Asian Cadet Championships in Nur-Sultan, Kazakhstan. The following month, he won the same weight class at the 2019 World Cadet Championships in Sofia, Bulgaria. In the world final, he defeated Azerbaijan's Elmir Aliyev 2–1.

Moving to the 60 kg class, he was runner-up at the 2021 World Junior Wrestling Championships in Ufa, Russia, and won gold at the 2022 World Junior Wrestling Championships in Sofia. In an August 2022 interview, Esmaeili said that prolonged national-team training camps had helped him turn his 2021 silver medal into gold. He stated that winning an Olympic gold medal in Paris was his long-term objective. In the same year, he told Hamshahri that he had recovered from trailing positions in the latter stages of his junior world championship matches, including the final against an Armenian opponent.

=== Senior competition and Olympic qualification (2023–2024) ===
Esmaeili moved to the senior 67 kg category and won the gold medal at the 2024 Vehbi Emre tournament in Turkey, defeating Uzbekistan's Mahmud Bakhshilloev 1–0 in the final. At the 2024 Asian Wrestling Championships in Bishkek, he won the 67 kg gold medal, defeating Kyrgyzstan's Razzak Beishekeev 3–1 in the final.

At the June 2024 Ranking Series tournament in Budapest, Esmaeili took a 7–0 lead against Cuba's reigning world champion Luis Orta in the 67 kg semifinal, but lost 9–7 after he turned toward his corner, apparently believing the match was over, and Orta scored a four-point throw with a fraction of a second remaining. Esmaeili recovered to defeat Japan's Kyotaro Sogabe 6–5 in the bronze-medal match. The tournament also determined which Iranian wrestler would be selected for the Paris Olympics. In a subsequent wrestle-off, Esmaeili defeated the reigning Olympic champion, Mohammad Reza Geraei, in two consecutive bouts, 6–0 and 6–4, to earn Iran's 67 kg Olympic berth.

=== 2024 Paris Olympics ===
At the men's 67 kg competition at the Paris Olympics, Esmaeili defeated Algeria's Ishak Ghaiou, Cuba's Luis Orta and Armenia's Slavik Galstyan to reach the final. His quarterfinal victory over Orta reversed the result of their Budapest meeting. He defeated Ukraine's Parviz Nasibov 6–5 in the final on 8 August 2024, overcoming an early 3–0 deficit to win the Olympic gold medal in his debut Games.

=== 2025: Asian, world and Islamic Solidarity Games titles ===
In March 2025, Esmaeili defended his 67 kg title at the Asian Wrestling Championships in Amman, Jordan, defeating Beishekeev 3–0 in the final. Afterward, he told United World Wrestling that public expectations had increased following his Olympic victory, adding to the pressure he felt at competitions.

Esmaeili made his first appearance at the senior World Wrestling Championships in September 2025 in Zagreb, Croatia. He won four matches by technical superiority to reach the final and defeated Azerbaijan's Hasrat Jafarov 2–1 to claim his first senior world title. Speaking after the final, he credited his strategy and said that he had sought to avoid unnecessary risks against Jafarov.

At the 2025 Islamic Solidarity Games in Riyadh, Saudi Arabia, he again defeated Jafarov in the 67 kg final. With the scores level at 3–3 and Jafarov ahead on criteria, Esmaeili scored a four-point throw in the last ten seconds; an unsuccessful Azerbaijani challenge brought the official score to 8–3. He also defeated Uzbekistan's Aytjan Khalmakhanov 9–0 during the event.

=== 2026: Second world title ===
In August 2026, Esmaeili competed at the Władysław Pytlasiński Memorial in Warsaw in the 72 kg class, above his usual 67 kg division. He won gold without conceding a point, defeating his Paris Olympic final opponent Parviz Nasibov 8–0 in the tournament final.

At the 2026 World Wrestling Championships in Astana, Kazakhstan, Esmaeili returned to 67 kg. He defeated the Netherlands' Ilias Laaouina 10–0, China's Jin Xinxin 11–0, and Kazakhstan's Bagdat Sabaz 7–2, before prevailing over Jafarov on criteria after a 1–1 semifinal. On 27 October, he defeated the 2025 world 63 kg champion Aytjan Khalmakhanov of Uzbekistan 8–0 in the final, winning his second consecutive senior world title.

== Recognition ==
United World Wrestling selected Esmaeili as its most dominant Greco-Roman wrestler of 2025. According to the governing body, he finished that season ranked first at 67 kg with an 11–0 record, including eight shutout victories and seven by technical superiority.

== Influence on younger wrestlers ==
In a June 2026 United World Wrestling feature, Esmaeili discussed his two younger cousins, Ali Esmaeili and Vahid Ashiri, who had taken up wrestling after his Olympic victory and subsequently won gold medals at the Asian U17 Championships in Da Nang, Vietnam. He said that he continued to follow their training and helped them with techniques when he returned from the national training camp in Tehran to Dezful.
