= Wrestling at the 2024 Summer Olympics – Men's Greco-Roman 67 kg =

Men's Greco-Roman 67 kg at the Games of the XXXIII Olympiad
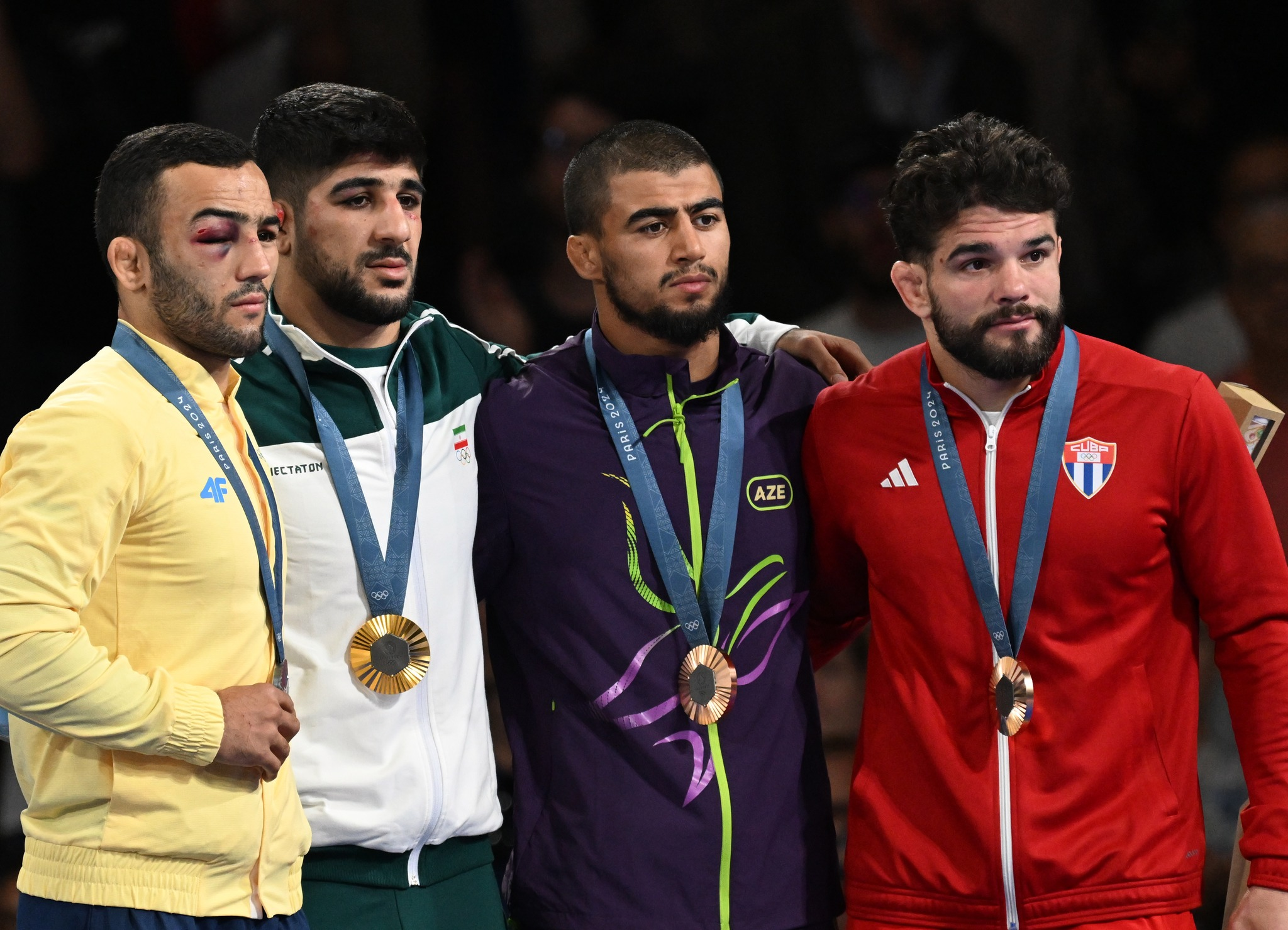
- The championship platform in the weight of 67 kg of Greek wrestling
- Venue: Grand Palais Éphémère
- Date: 7–8 August 2024
- Competitors: 16 from 16 nations

Medalists
1st place, gold medalist(s)		Saeid Esmaeili	Iran
2nd place, silver medalist(s)		Parviz Nasibov	Ukraine
3rd place, bronze medalist(s)		Hasrat Jafarov	Azerbaijan
3rd place, bronze medalist(s)		Luis Orta	Cuba

Men's Greco-Roman 67 kilograms competition at the 2024 Summer Olympics in Paris, France, took place on 7–8 August 2024 at the Grand Palais Éphémère in Champ de Mars.

== Background ==
This is the 27th appearance of men's Greco-Roman lightweight event, this made eventual debut in 1908 and it has participate in every games since then,

- 1908: 66.6kg
- 1912-1920: 67.5 kg
- 1924: 67kg
- 1928: 67.5kg
- 1932-1936: 66 kg
- 1948-1960: 67kg
- 1964-1968: 70kg
- 1972-1996: 68kg
- 2000: 69kg
- 2004-16: 66kg
- 2020-current: 67kg

Saeid Esmaeili won the event by defeating Parviz Nasibov in the final, Defending 2020 champion Luis Orta upgraded to lightweight and Hasrat Jafarov won the bronze medals with Orta going through repechage.

== Format ==
This Greco-Roman competition consists of a single-elimination tournament, with a repechage used to determine the winner of two bronze medals. The two finalists face off for gold and silver medals. Each wrestler who loses to one of the two finalists moves into the repechage, culminating in a pair of bronze medal matches featuring the semifinal losers each facing the remaining repechage opponent from their half of the bracket.

== Rules ==
A typical bout consists of two halves of three minutes each separated by a 30-second break. The two competitors compete on a mat, which is nine meters in diameter. Wrestlers try to score points by executing various legal maneuvers. Points ranging from one to five are awarded by the mat referee depending on the degree of difficulty of the maneuvers. Points are also awarded to the opponent in case of infractions such as illegal holds, passivity etc. A wrestler is automatically disqualified if three cautions are awarded during a bout. Forcing an opponent's shoulders to the mat results in an instant victory by fall.

During the course of a match, if a wrestler builds a 10-point advantage over the opponent, the bout is stopped and the leader is declared as the winner by technical superiority. The total scores are totaled at the end of the stipulated six-minute period, and the wrestler with the maximum points wins. In case of a tie, the wrestler who has scored the last point is declared the winner. A competitor might also be declared a winner if the opponent does not turn up or is medically unfit to compete.

== Qualification ==
Sixteen quota places were available with each nation restricted to a maximum of one spot. Five quota places were awarded at the 2023 World Wrestling Championships, which took place from the 16th to 24th of September in Belgrade, Serbia. The finalists of each category in the four continental qualification tournaments (Asia, Europe, the Americas, and the joint Africa & Oceania) were awarded quota places. The remainder of the total quota was allocated at the 2024 World Wrestling Olympic Qualification Tournament, offering a minimum of three quota places.

== Schedule ==
All times are Central European Time (UTC+02:00)

Date	Time	Event
7 August 2024	11:00	Qualification rounds
7 August 2024	18:15	Semifinals
8 August 2024	11:00	Repechage
8 August 2024	18:15	Finals

== Results ==
Sixteen athletes qualified for the competition.

Legend

- F — Won by fall

=== Main bracket ===
Round of 16
Hasrat Jafarov (AZE)	9
Mohamed Ibrahim El-Sayed (EGY)	0
Néstor Almanza (CHI)	0
Valentin Petic (MDA)	4
Amantur Ismailov (KGZ)	12
Ramaz Zoidze (GEO)	1
Parviz Nasibov (UKR)	3
Mate Nemeš (SRB)	2
Slavik Galstyan (ARM)	3
Andrés Montaño (ECU)	2
Souleymen Nasr (TUN)	1
Mamadassa Sylla (FRA)	1
Saeid Esmaeili (IRI)	10
Ishak Ghaiou (ALG)	0
Kyotaro Sogabe (JPN)	0
Luis Orta (CUB)	8

Quarterfinals
Hasrat Jafarov (AZE)	3
Valentin Petic (MDA)	1
Amantur Ismailov (KGZ)	6
Parviz Nasibov (UKR)	7
Slavik Galstyan (ARM)	3
Mamadassa Sylla (FRA)	2
Saeid Esmaeili (IRI)	9
Luis Orta (CUB)	0

Semifinals
Hasrat Jafarov (AZE)	3
Parviz Nasibov (UKR)	3
Slavik Galstyan (ARM)	4
Saeid Esmaeili (IRI)	10

Final
Parviz Nasibov (UKR)	5
Saeid Esmaeili (IRI)	6

=== Repechage ===
Repechage
Mate Nemeš (SRB)	0
Amantur Ismailov (KGZ)	8
Ishak Ghaiou (ALG)	0
Luis Orta (CUB)	9

Bronze medal matches
Amantur Ismailov (KGZ)	0
Hasrat Jafarov (AZE)	8
Luis Orta (CUB)	7
Slavik Galstyan (ARM)	0

== Final standing ==
Rank	Athlete
1st place, gold medalist(s)	Saeid Esmaeili (IRI)
2nd place, silver medalist(s)	Parviz Nasibov (UKR)
3rd place, bronze medalist(s)	Hasrat Jafarov (AZE)
3rd place, bronze medalist(s)	Luis Orta (CUB)
5	Amantur Ismailov (KGZ)
5	Slavik Galstyan (ARM)
7	Valentin Petic (MDA)
8	Mamadassa Sylla (FRA)
9	Andrés Montaño (ECU)
10	Mate Nemeš (SRB)
11	Souleymen Nasr (TUN)
12	Ramaz Zoidze (GEO)
13	Néstor Almanza (CHI)
14	Kyotaro Sogabe (JPN)
15	Mohamed Ibrahim El-Sayed (EGY)
16	Ishak Ghaiou (ALG)
