= Ishak Ghaiou =

Algerian Greco-Roman wrestler

Personal information
- Nationality: Algerian
- Born: 24 January 1995 (age 31) Annaba, Algeria

Sport
- Country: Algeria
- Sport: Greco-Roman wrestling

Ishak Ghaiou (born 24 January 1995) is an Algerian Greco-Roman wrestler. He competed in the men's 67kg event at the 2024 Summer Olympics, where he lost in the Round of 16 to eventual gold medallist Saeid Esmaeili, then lost in the repechage to Luis Orta.
