= 2019 World Wrestling Championships – Men's Greco-Roman 63 kg =

Men's Greco-Roman 63 kg at the 2019 World Championships
- Venue: Barys Arena
- Dates: 14–15 September 2019
- Competitors: 18 from 18 nations

Medalists
gold medal	Shinobu Ota	Japan
silver medal	Stepan Maryanyan	Russia
bronze medal	Slavik Galstyan	Armenia
bronze medal	Almat Kebispayev	Kazakhstan

The men's Greco-Roman 63 kilograms is a competition featured at the 2019 World Wrestling Championships, and was held in Nur-Sultan, Kazakhstan on 14 and 15 September.

This Greco-Roman wrestling competition consists of a single-elimination tournament, with a repechage used to determine the winner of two bronze medals. The two finalists face off for gold and silver medals. Each wrestler who loses to one of the two finalists moves into the repechage, culminating in a pair of bronze medal matches featuring the semifinal losers each facing the remaining repechage opponent from their half of the bracket.

Shinobu Ota from Japan won the gold medal.

== Results ==
=== Final ===
Final
Stepan Maryanyan (RUS)	4
Shinobu Ota (JPN)	10

=== Top half ===
Round of 32

Round of 16
Stepan Maryanyan (RUS)	4
Meisam Dalkhani (IRI)	2
Levani Kavjaradze (GEO)	6
Jung Jin-woong (KOR)	9
Islomjon Bakhromov (UZB)	5
Oleksandr Hrushyn (UKR)	2
Elman Mukhtarov (AZE)	7
Slavik Galstyan (ARM)	16

Quarterfinals
Stepan Maryanyan (RUS)	8
Jung Jin-woong (KOR)	0
Islomjon Bakhromov (UZB)	3
Slavik Galstyan (ARM)	3

Semifinals
Stepan Maryanyan (RUS)	4
Slavik Galstyan (ARM)	2

=== Bottom half ===
Round of 32
Ryan Mango (USA)	11
Julinho Dju (POR)	0
Sagar (IND)	0
Almat Kebispayev (KAZ)	9

Round of 16
Shinobu Ota (JPN)	10
Maksim Nehoda (BLR)	2
Tynar Sharshenbekov (KGZ)	8
Rumen Savchev (BUL)	1
Rahman Bilici (TUR)	7
Ryan Mango (USA)	4
Almat Kebispayev (KAZ)	2
Tuo Erbatu (CHN)	2

Quarterfinals
Shinobu Ota (JPN)	12
Tynar Sharshenbekov (KGZ)	4
Rahman Bilici (TUR)	4
Almat Kebispayev (KAZ)	7

Semifinals
Shinobu Ota (JPN)	10
Almat Kebispayev (KAZ)	1

=== Repechage ===
Repechage round 2
Meisam Dalkhani (IRI)	5
Jung Jin-woong (KOR)	3
Maksim Nehoda (BLR)	4
Tynar Sharshenbekov (KGZ)	6

Bronze medals
Meisam Dalkhani (IRI)	5
Slavik Galstyan (ARM)	7
Tynar Sharshenbekov (KGZ)	0
Almat Kebispayev (KAZ)	9
