= Kyotaro Sogabe =

Japanese wrestler

Personal information
- Born: 3 July 2001 (age 25)
Medal record
Men's Greco-Roman wrestling
Representing Japan
Asian Games
Silver medal – second place	2026 Aichi–Nagoya	67 kg
Asian Championships
Silver medal – second place	2023 Astana	67 kg
Grand Prix
Bronze medal – third place	2026 Zagreb	67 kg
U23 World Championships
Bronze medal – third place	2022 Pontevedra	67 kg

Kyotaro Sogabe (Japanese: 曽我部 京太郎, born 3 July 2001) is a Japanese wrestler. Sogabe represented Japan at the 2024 Summer Olympics, qualifying by defeating Meiirzhan Shermakhanbet in the Olympic qualifying tournament in Bishkek. In the men's Greco-Roman 67 kg wrestling event, Sogabe lost in the first round to Luis Orta.
