= Abu Muslim Amaev =

Russian Greco-Roman wrestler (born 1999)

Abu Muslim Amaev Абу-Муслим Амаев
Personal information
- Native name: Russian: Абу-Муслим Аптиевич Амаев
- Full name: Abu Muslim Aptievitch Amaev
- Nationality: Russian; Bulgarian
- Born: 11 December 1999 (age 26) Chechnya, Russia

Sport
- Country: Russia (2015—2022); Bulgaria (2023—present)
- Sport: Wrestling
- Weight class: 63kg 67kg
- Rank: International Master of sports
- Event: Greco-Roman
- Club: CSKA Sofia
- Coached by: A. Magomadov; S. Frolovsky
Medal record
Men's Greco-Roman wrestling
Representing Bulgaria
European Championships
Silver medal – second place	2025 Bratislava	67 kg
Bronze medal – third place	2023 Zagreb	63 kg
Bronze medal – third place	2024 Bucharest	67 kg
Dan Kolov - Nikola Petrov Tournament
Gold medal – first place	2023 Sofia	63 kg
Grand Prix
Gold medal – first place	2023 Warsaw	63 kg
Representing Russia
Junior World Championships
Gold medal – first place	2019 Tallinn	63 kg
Junior European Championships
Silver medal – second place	2018 Rome	60 kg
Cadet World Championships
Silver medal – second place	2015 Sarajevo	42 kg

Abu Muslim Aptievitch Amaev (Russian: Абу-Муслим Аптиевич Амаев; born 11 December 1999) is a Russian-born Bulgarian Greco-Roman wrestler of Chechen descent. 2023-2024 European championships bronze medalist.

== Sport career ==
Amaev was the 2015 Cadet World Championships silver medalist and runner-up at the 2018 European Championships in Rome, Italy. In 2019, he finished with the silver medal at the Junior Russian national championships and became junior world champion held in Tallinn, Estonia at 63 kilos. In 2021, he won his first bronze medal at the senior Russian national championships. Since 2023 he started representing Bulgaria in international level and earned the bronze medal for Bulgaria at the 2023 European Championships and finished first at the Dan Kolov - Nikola Petrov tournament. In 2024, Amaev took another bronze medal from the European Championships.

== Wrestling achievements ==
- 2015 Cadet World Championships — 2nd;
- 2018 Junior European Championships — 2nd;
- 2019 Junior Russian National Championships — 2nd;
- 2019 Junior World Championships — 1st;
- 2021 Russian National Championships — 3rd;
- 2023 European Championships — 3rd;
- 2023 Dan Kolov & Nikola Petrov Tournament — 1st;
- 2024 European Championships — 3rd;
