= Parviz Nasibov =

Azerbaijani-Ukrainian Greco-Roman wrestler

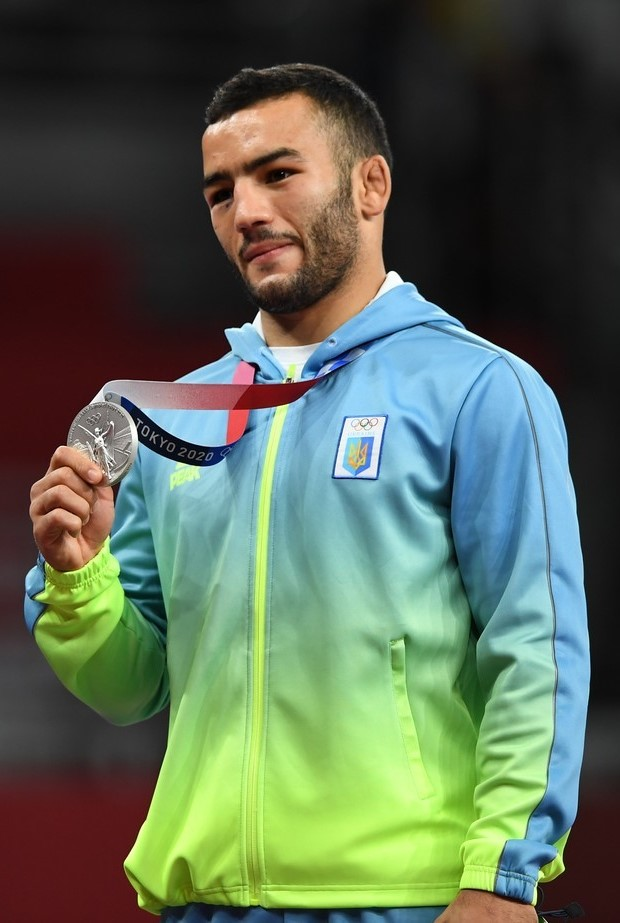
- Nasibov in 2021

Personal information
- Nationality: Ukraine
- Born: 18 August 1998 (age 27) Muganli, Aghstafa District, Azerbaijan
- Weight: 67 kg (148 lb)

Sport
- Sport: Wrestling
- Event: Greco-Roman
Medal record
Men's Greco-Roman wrestling
Representing Ukraine
Olympic Games
Silver medal – second place	2020 Tokyo	67 kg
Silver medal – second place	2024 Paris	67 kg
European Championships
Bronze medal – third place	2023 Zagreb	67 kg
Bronze medal – third place	2024 Bucharest	72 kg
University World Cup
Gold medal – first place	2022 Samsun	72 kg
Dan Kolov & Nikola Petrov Tournament
Gold medal – first place	2026 Plovdiv	72 kg
Grand Prix
Gold medal – first place	2024 Zagreb	67 kg
Gold medal – first place	2025 Nice	72 kg
Silver medal – second place	2026 Nice	67 kg
World Juniors Championships
Bronze medal – third place	2018 Trnava	67 kg
European Juniors Championships
Gold medal – first place	2017 Dortmund	66 kg
Silver medal – second place	2015 Istanbul	60 kg
Silver medal – second place	2016 Bucharest	66 kg

Parviz Nasibov (Ukrainian: Парві́з Паша-огли Насі́бов; Azerbaijani: Pərviz Paşa oğlu Nəsibov; born 18 August 1998) is an Azerbaijani-Ukrainian Greco-Roman wrestler. He represented Ukraine at the 2020 Olympic games in Tokyo 2021 and at the 2024 Olympic games in Paris, competing in Men's Greco-Roman 67 kg. He resides in Zaporizhzhia, Ukraine.

He won one of the bronze medals in the 72 kg event at the 2024 European Wrestling Championships held in Bucharest, Romania. He competed at the 2024 European Wrestling Olympic Qualification Tournament in Baku, Azerbaijan and he earned a quota place for Ukraine for the 2024 Summer Olympics in Paris, France, where he won his second consecutive silver medal in the 67kg weight class.
