= Hasrat Jafarov =

Azerbaijani Greco-Roman wrestler

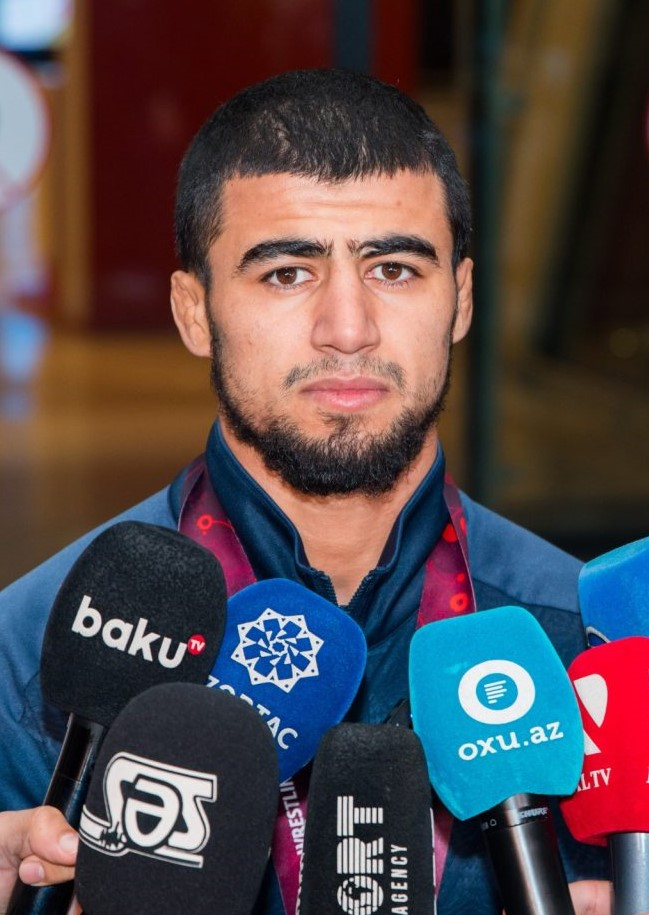
- Jafarov in 2025

Personal information
- Nationality: Azerbaijan
- Born: 5 October 2002 (age 24) Karadagly, Goranboy, Azerbaijan
- Height: 172 cm (5 ft 8 in)

Sport
- Country: Azerbaijan
- Sport: Amateur wrestling
- Weight class: 67 kg
- Event: Greco-Roman
Medal record
Men's Greco-Roman wrestling
Representing Azerbaijan
Olympic Games
Bronze medal – third place	2024 Paris	67 kg
World Championships
Silver medal – second place	2023 Belgrade	67 kg
Silver medal – second place	2025 Zagreb	67 kg
Bronze medal – third place	2022 Belgrade	67 kg
European Championships
Gold medal – first place	2023 Zagreb	67 kg
Gold medal – first place	2024 Bucharest	67 kg
Gold medal – first place	2025 Bratislava	67 kg
Gold medal – first place	2026 Tirana	67 kg
Bronze medal – third place	2022 Budapest	67 kg
Islamic Solidarity Games
Gold medal – first place	2021 Konya	67 kg
Silver medal – second place	2025 Riyadh	67 kg
Grand Prix
Gold medal – first place	2022 Rome	67 kg
Gold medal – first place	2023 Budapest	67 kg
Gold medal – first place	2024 Budapest	72 kg
Bronze medal – third place	2024 Zagreb	67 kg
World U23 Championships
Gold medal – first place	2021 Belgrade	67 kg
European U23 Championship
Bronze medal – third place	2021 Skopje	67 kg
World Junior Championships
Gold medal – first place	2021 Ufa	67 kg
European Juniors Championships
Gold medal – first place	2021 Dortmund	67 kg

Hasrat Jafarov (Azerbaijani: Həsrət Cəfərov; born 5 October 2002 in Karadagly, Goranboy) is an Azerbaijani Greco-Roman wrestler competing in the 67 kg division. He won the gold medal at the 2023 European Wrestling Championships.

== Career ==
Jafarov is a gold medalist of World U23 Championships, the World Junior Championships, and European Junior Championships in 2021. He is the first Greco-Roman wrestler to become a world champion among Azerbaijani U-23 wrestlers. In April 2023, he became the European champion.

Jafarov won a bronze medal in the men's Greco-Roman 67 kg at 2021 European U23 Wrestling Championship. He also won the gold medal in that event at the 2021 World Junior Wrestling Championships in Ufa, Russia.

In November 2021, he won the gold medal in that event at the 2021 U23 World Wrestling Championships held in Belgrade, Serbia.

He won the gold medal in his event at the 2021 Islamic Solidarity Games held in Konya, Turkey.

Jafarov became the European champion for the first time at the 2023 European Wrestling Championships in Zagreb, Croatia by defeating Georgian Joni Khetsuriani 3–2 in the final match of the men's 67 kg wrestling championships. Jafarov, who started the championship from the last 16 round, reached the quarterfinals by defeating his Portuguese rival Pedro Caldas with a pin while leading 2–1. He defeated Norway's Håvard Jørgensen 7–1 in the quarterfinals and Murat Fırat 7–1 in the semifinals to reach the final.

He won the gold medal in the 67 kg event at the 2024 European Wrestling Championships held in Bucharest, Romania. He defeated Ruslan Bichurin in his gold medal match. He won a bronze medal in the 67 kg event at the 2024 Summer Olympics in Paris, France.

As of April 1, 2026, Jafarov leads the ranking of Azerbaijani athletes according to the Ministry of Youth and Sports with a score of 480 points.

On October 26, 2026, at the World Championship in Astana, he won a quarterfinal victory over South Korea's Chon Han-jae, but lost in the semifinal to Iran's Saeed Esmaili.

== Achievements ==
Year	Tournament	Location	Result	Event
2022	World Championships	Belgrade, Serbia	3rd	Greco-Roman 67 kg
2022	European Championships	Budapest, Hungary	3rd	Greco-Roman 67 kg
2022	Islamic Solidarity Games	Konya, Turkey	1st	Greco-Roman 67 kg
2023	European Championships	Zagreb, Croatia	1st	Greco-Roman 67 kg
2023	World Championships	Belgrade, Serbia	2nd	Greco-Roman 67 kg
2024	European Championships	Bucharest, Romania	1st	Greco-Roman 67 kg
2024	Summer Olympics	Paris, France	3rd	Greco-Roman 67 kg
2025	European Championships	Bratislava, Slovakia	1st	Greco-Roman 67 kg
2025	World Championships	Zagreb, Croatia	2nd	Greco-Roman 67 kg
2026	European Championships	Tirana, Albania	1st	Greco-Roman 67 kg
