= Aker Al-Obaidi =

Iraqi Greco-Roman wrestler

Aker Al Obaidi
Personal information
- Born: 21 September 1999 (age 26) Mosul, Iraq

Sport
- Sport: Wrestling
- Event: Greco-Roman

Aker Al Obaidi Schmid (born 21 September 1999) is an Iraqi-born Greco-Roman wrestler who lives in Austria, where he is a citizen. He competes for Austria and was also selected by the International Olympic Committee (IOC) to compete for the Refugee Olympic Team at the 2020 Summer Olympics in Tokyo, Japan. He is the 2019 European junior bronze medalist in 67 kg Greco-Roman wrestling.

== Early life ==
Al Obaidi's father was a wrestler. He started wrestling at age 6 and continued until 14 when he was forced to leave his home in Mosul, Iraq to avoid being recruited by the Islamic State. He became separated from his family. He traveled to Europe and was granted asylum in Austria, where he began learning German and working as a painter. Al Obaidi also resumed wrestling, which helped him transition to living in a new country as he made Austrian friends through the sport.

== Career ==
After two years in Austria, Al Obaidi moved to Inzing for training.

In 2019, he was awarded a Refugee Athlete Scholarship. Competing for Austria, he won the bronze medal at the 2019 European Juniors Championships. He also placed 18th at the 2019 World Junior Championships.

In 2021, he competed at the 2020 Summer Olympics as a member of the Refugee Olympic Team. He competed in the men's Greco-Roman 67 kg event, where he advanced to the quarter finals before losing to Ramaz Zoidze.

Since the Olympics, he has competed in the 63 kg and 60 kg weight categories. He injured his meniscus and underwent surgery for it in 2022.

Al Obaidi attempted to qualify for the 2024 Summer Olympics. However, he was unable to after he injured his left shoulder in May, which required surgery.

== Personal life ==
Al Obaidi obtained Austrian citizenship and married an Austrian woman. He took her surname, Schmid.
