= Néstor Almanza (wrestler, born 2002) =

Chilean-Cuban Greco-Roman wrestler

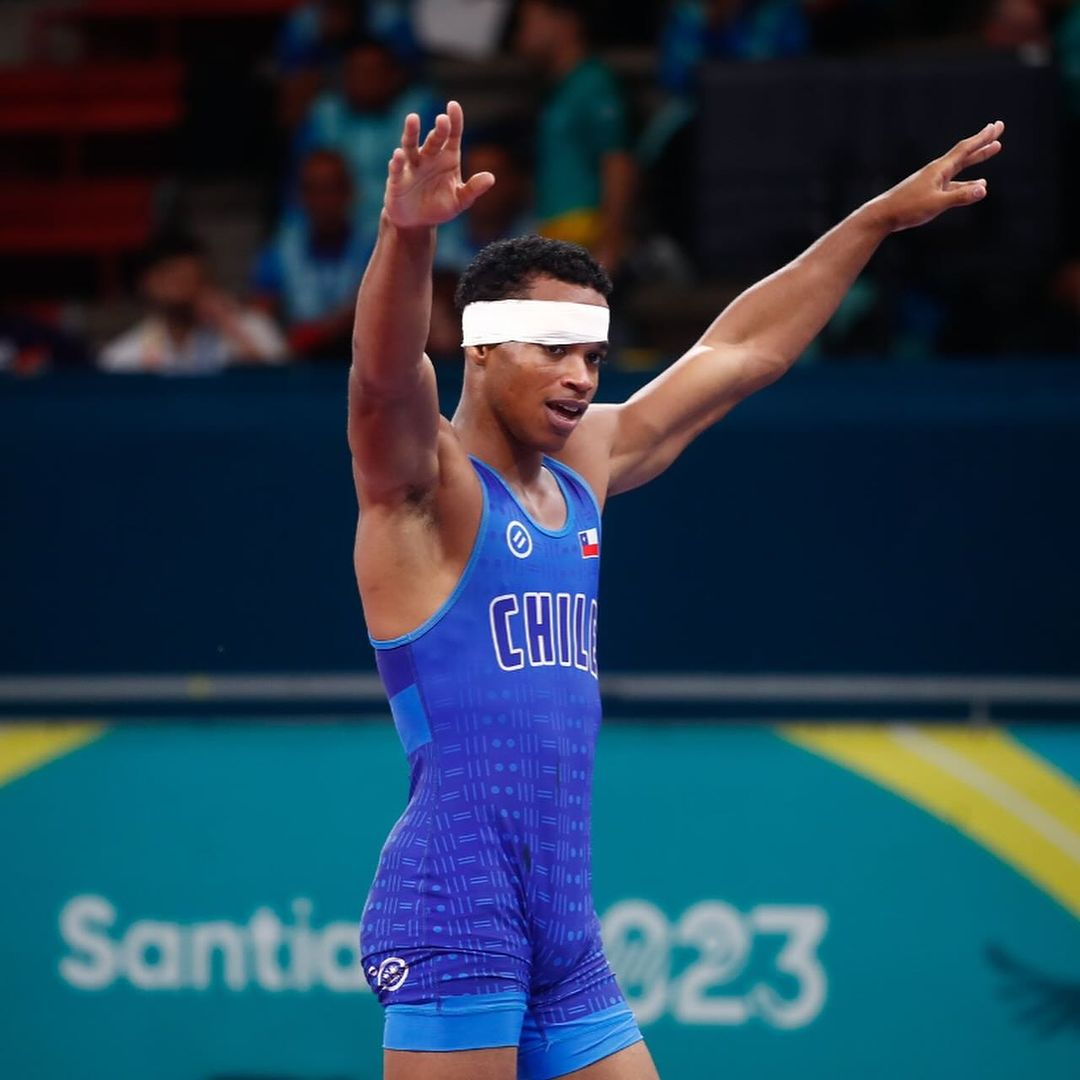

Personal information
- Full name: Néstor Evian Almanza Truyol
- Born: 28 July 2002 (age 23) Havana, Cuba

Sport
- Weight class: 67 kg (148 lb)
Medal record
Men's Greco-Roman wrestling
Representing Chile
Pan American Championships
Silver medal – second place	2023 Buenos Aires	-67 kg
Bronze medal – third place	2024 Acapulco	-67 kg
Silver medal – second place	2025 Monterrey	-67 kg

Néstor Evian Almanza Truyol (Note: In this Spanish name, the first or paternal surname is Almanza and the second or maternal family name is Truyol.) (born 28 July 2002) is a Chilean-Cuban Greco-Roman wrestler. Competing for Chile at the 2024 Summer Olympics, he competed in the men's 67kg Greco-Roman wrestling event. At the Games, he lost in the first round to Valentin Petic of Moldova.

== Personal life ==
Almanza's father Nestor Almanza was a Greco-Roman wrestler who represented Cuba at the 1992 Summer Olympics.
