= Luis Orta (wrestler) =

Cuban wrestler (born 1994)

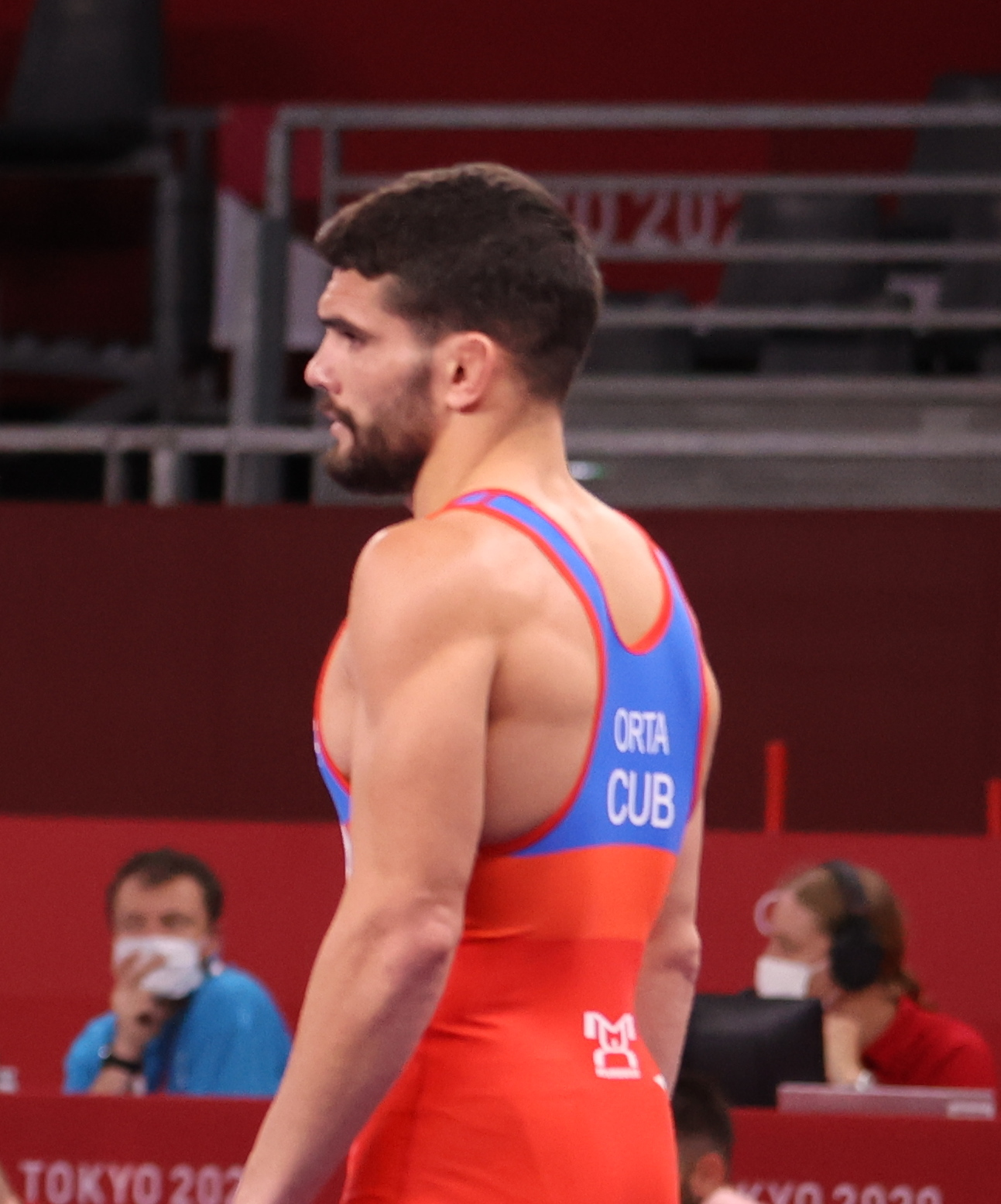
- Orta at the 2020 Summer Olympics

Personal information
- Full name: Luis Alberto Orta Sánchez
- Born: 22 August 1994 (age 32) Havana, Cuba
- Height: 165 cm (5 ft 5 in)
- Weight: 67 kg (148 lb)

Sport
- Sport: Wrestling
Medal record
Men's Greco-Roman wrestling
Representing Cuba
Olympic Games
Gold medal – first place	2020 Tokyo	60 kg
Bronze medal – third place	2024 Paris	67 kg
World Championships
Gold medal – first place	2023 Belgrade	67 kg
Bronze medal – third place	2026 Astana	67 kg
Pan American Games
Gold medal – first place	2023 Santiago	67 kg
Bronze medal – third place	2019 Lima	60 kg
Pan American Championships
Gold medal – first place	2018 Lima	60 kg
Gold medal – first place	2019 Buenos Aires	60 kg
Gold medal – first place	2023 Buenos Aires	67 kg
Gold medal – first place	2025 Monterrey	67 kg
Gold medal – first place	2026 Coralville	67 kg
Central American and Caribbean Games
Gold medal – first place	2018 Barranquilla	60 kg
Gold medal – first place	2023 San Salvador	67 kg
Grand Prix
Bronze medal – third place	2023 Zagreb	67 kg
Bronze medal – third place	2023 Bishkek	67 kg

Luis Alberto Orta Sánchez (Note: In this Spanish name, the first or paternal surname is Orta and the second or maternal family name is Sánchez.) (born 22 August 1994) is a Cuban Greco-Roman wrestler who competes at 60 kilograms. He claimed the 2020 Summer Olympic gold medal in 2021, and had previously claimed continental championships at the 2018 Central American and Caribbean Games and the 2018 and 2019 Pan American Championships.

He won one of the bronze medals in the 67 kg event at the 2024 Summer Olympics in Paris, France.
