= Sebastian Nađ =

Serbian Greco-Roman wrestler

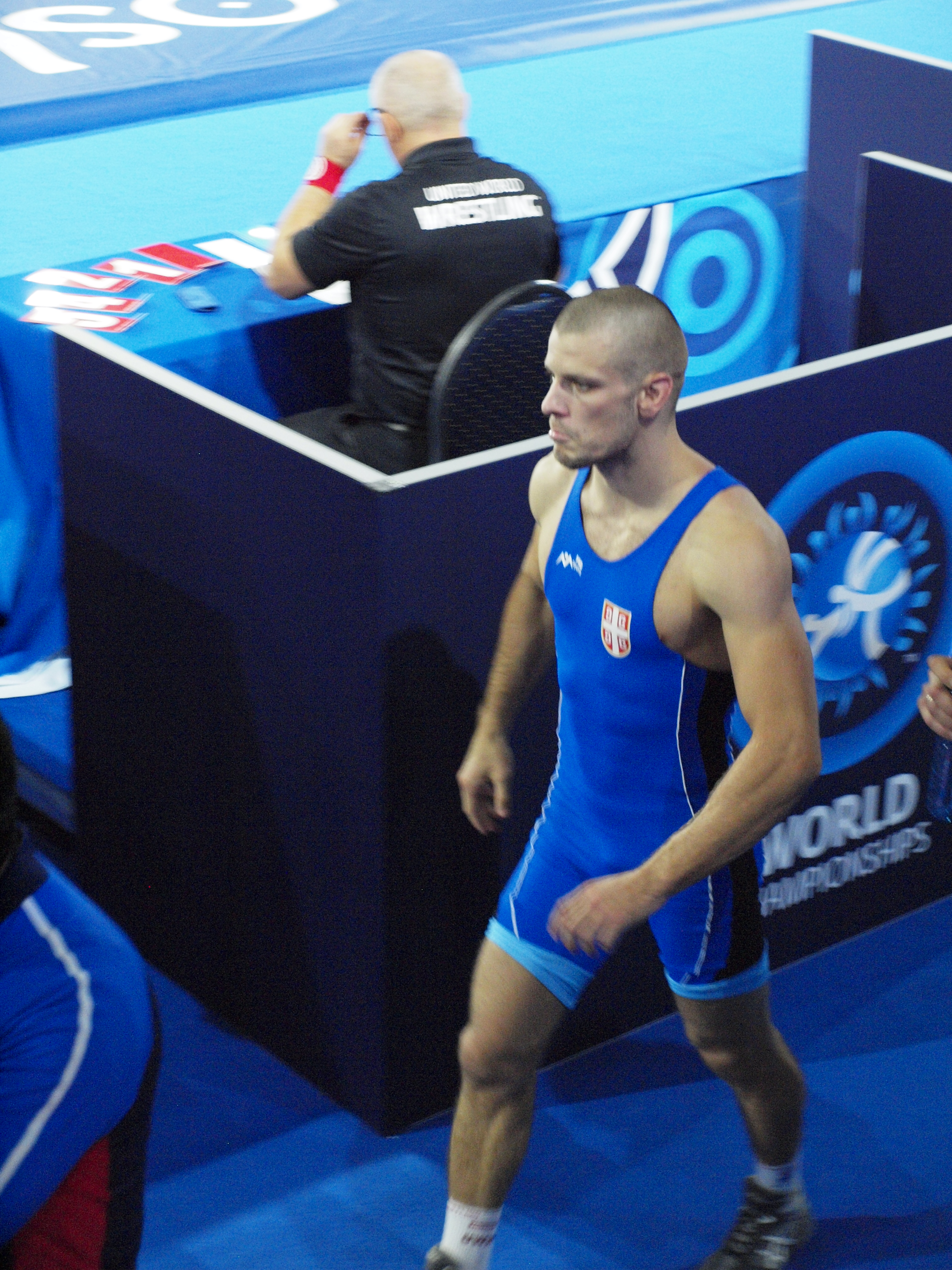
- Nađ at the 2021 World Wrestling Championships in Oslo, Norway

Personal information
- Nationality: Serbia
- Born: Себастијан Нађ; 30 May 1997 (age 29) Senta, Serbia, FR Yugoslavia
- Height: 171 cm (5 ft 7 in)

Sport
- Country: Serbia
- Sport: Amateur wrestling
- Weight class: 63 kg; 67 kg
- Event: Greco-Roman

Achievements and titles
- World finals: (gold) (2022)
- Regional finals: 5th(2022)
Medal record
Men's Greco-Roman wrestling
Representing Serbia
World Championships
Gold medal – first place	2022 Belgrade	63 kg
Vehbi Emre & Hamit Kaplan Tournament
Bronze medal – third place	2025 Kocaeli	67 kg
Dan Kolov & Nikola Petrov Tournament
Silver medal – second place	2021 Plovdiv	67 kg
Silver medal – second place	2022 Veliko Tarnovo	67 kg
Grand Prix Zagreb Open
Bronze medal – third place	2020 Zagreb	67 kg
European U23 Championships
Silver medal – second place	2019 Novi Sad	67 kg
Bronze medal – third place	2017 Szombathely	66 kg

Sebastian Nađ (Serbian Cyrillic: Себастијан Нађ; born 30 May 1997) is a Serbian Greco-Roman wrestler. He won the gold medal in the 63 kg event at the 2022 World Wrestling Championships held in Belgrade, Serbia.

== Career ==
In 2017, Nađ lost his bronze medal match at the U23 European Championships held in Szombathely, Hungary. A few months later, he was awarded the bronze medal after Aslan Visaitov of Russia tested positive for a banned substance.

Nađ competed in the 67 kg event at the 2021 World Wrestling Championships held in Oslo, Norway. He lost his bronze medal match in the 67 kg event at the European Wrestling Championships in Budapest, Hungary.

Nađ won the silver medal in the men's 67 kg at the 2021 Dan Kolov & Nikola Petrov Tournament held in Plovdiv, Bulgaria and the 2022 Dan Kolov & Nikola Petrov Tournament held in Veliko Tarnovo, Bulgaria.

== Achievements ==
Year	Tournament	Location	Result	Event
2022	World Championships	Belgrade, Serbia	1st	Greco-Roman 63 kg
