= Valentin Petic =

Moldovan Greco-Roman wrestler

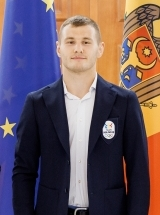
- Petic in 2024

Personal information
- Born: 18 December 1999 (age 25)

Valentin Petic (born 18 December 1999) is a Moldovan wrestler. Petic competed for Moldova at the 2024 Summer Olympics after qualifying at the pre-Olympic tournament in Istanbul. In the men's 67kg Greco-Roman wrestling event, Petic defeated Nestor Almanza in the first round of the tournament before losing to Hasrat Jafarov in the quarterfinals. At the 2025 Zagreb Open, Petic won a silver medal in the men's Greco-Roman 67kg division.
