= Slavik Galstyan =

Armenian sport wrestler

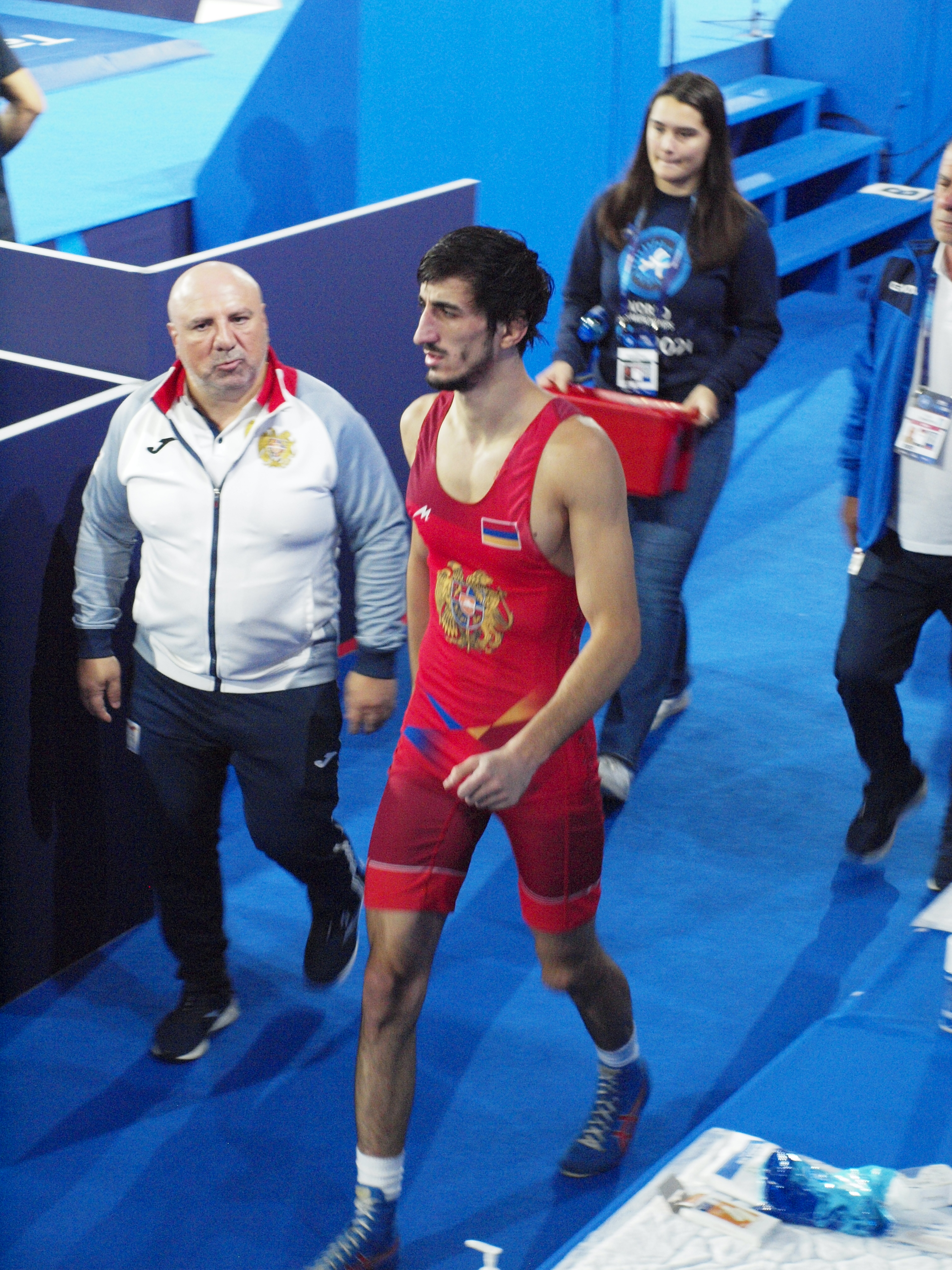
- Slavik Galstyan at the 2021 World Wrestling Championships in Oslo, Norway

Personal information
- Nationality: (Armenia) Armenian
- Born: 21 December 1996 (age 29)
- Height: 1.90 m (6 ft 3 in)
- Weight: 67 kg (148 lb)

Sport
- Country: Armenia
- Sport: Wrestling
- Event: Greco-Roman
Medal record
Men's Greco-Roman wrestling
Representing Armenia
World Championships
Bronze medal – third place	2019 Nur-Sultan	63 kg
Bronze medal – third place	2025 Zagreb	67 kg
European Championships
Bronze medal – third place	2021 Warsaw	67 kg
Bronze medal – third place	2022 Budapest	67 kg
Individual World Cup
Bronze medal – third place	2020 Belgrade	67 kg
Dan Kolov - Nikola Petrov Tournament
Gold medal – first place	2023 Sofia	67 kg

Slavik Galstyan also spelled as Slavik Galstian (born 21 December 1996) is an Armenian sport wrestler who competes in the men's Greco Roman category. He claimed the bronze medal in the men's 63 kg event during the 2019 World Wrestling Championships.

In March 2021, he competed at the European Qualification Tournament in Budapest, Hungary hoping to qualify for the 2020 Summer Olympics in Tokyo, Japan.

He competed in the 67 kg event at the 2022 World Wrestling Championships held in Belgrade, Serbia.

He lost his bronze medal match in the 67 kg event at the 2024 Summer Olympics in Paris, France.
