= 2019 World Wrestling Championships – Men's Greco-Roman 67 kg =

Men's Greco-Roman 67 kg at the 2019 World Championships
- Venue: Barys Arena
- Dates: 15–16 September 2019
- Competitors: 41 from 41 nations

Medalists
gold medal	Ismael Borrero	Cuba
silver medal	Artem Surkov	Russia
bronze medal	Mate Nemeš	Serbia
bronze medal	Frank Stäbler	Germany

The men's Greco-Roman 67 kilograms is a competition featured at the 2019 World Wrestling Championships, and was held in Nur-Sultan, Kazakhstan on 15 and 16 September.

== Results ==
Legend

- F — Won by fall

=== Finals ===
Semifinals		Final
Artem Surkov (RUS)	5^{F}
Fredrik Bjerrehuus (DEN)	0	Artem Surkov (RUS)	1
Mohamed Ibrahim El-Sayed (EGY)	2	Ismael Borrero (CUB)	3
Ismael Borrero (CUB)	6

=== Top half ===
==== Section 1 ====
Round of 64

Round of 32
Artem Surkov (RUS)	8^{F}
Chen Yan-kai (TPE)	0
Matouš Morbitzer (CZE)	0
Andreas Vetsch (SUI)	5
Christoph Burger (AUT)	0
Mate Nemeš (SRB)	8
Leoš Drmola (SVK)	8
Pedro Caldas (POR)	0

Round of 16
Artem Surkov (RUS)	9
Andreas Vetsch (SUI)	0
Mate Nemeš (SRB)	3
Leoš Drmola (SVK)	0

Quarterfinals
Artem Surkov (RUS)	2
Mate Nemeš (SRB)	1

==== Section 2 ====
Round of 64

Round of 32
Manuel López (MEX)	0
Shogo Takahashi (JPN)	5
Fredrik Bjerrehuus (DEN)	7
Aleksandrs Jurkjans (LAT)	0
Deyvid Dimitrov (BUL)	10
Manish (IND)	1
Ellis Coleman (USA)	10
Meirzhan Shermakhanbet (KAZ)	2

Round of 16
Shogo Takahashi (JPN)	5
Fredrik Bjerrehuus (DEN)	13
Deyvid Dimitrov (BUL)	5
Ellis Coleman (USA)	0

Quarterfinals
Fredrik Bjerrehuus (DEN)	6
Deyvid Dimitrov (BUL)	0

=== Bottom half ===
==== Section 3 ====
Round of 64
Shmagi Bolkvadze (GEO)	2
Amantur Ismailov (KGZ)	1
Mohamed Ibrahim El-Sayed (EGY)	11
Soslan Daurov (BLR)	3

Round of 32
Gevorg Sahakyan (POL)	7^{F}
Daniel Soini (SWE)	0
Son Kwon-hwi (PRK)	2
Edgaras Venckaitis (LTU)	4^{F}
Mubinjon Akhmedov (TJK)	1
Karen Aslanyan (ARM)	10
Shmagi Bolkvadze (GEO)	1
Mohamed Ibrahim El-Sayed (EGY)	9

Round of 16
Gevorg Sahakyan (POL)	9
Edgaras Venckaitis (LTU)	0
Karen Aslanyan (ARM)	3
Mohamed Ibrahim El-Sayed (EGY)	6

Quarterfinals
Gevorg Sahakyan (POL)	9
Mohamed Ibrahim El-Sayed (EGY)	9

==== Section 4 ====
Round of 64
Hamed Tab (IRI)	0
Ismael Borrero (CUB)	9
Yasin Özay (FRA)	3
Mihai Mihuț (ROU)	3
Artur Politaiev (UKR)	2
Morten Thoresen (NOR)	3
Mirzobek Rakhmatov (UZB)	1
Frank Stäbler (GER)	9
Atakan Yüksel (TUR)	5
Denis Bolunov (EST)	0
Huang Xin (CHN)	4
Donior Islamov (MDA)	7
Rasul Chunayev (AZE)	8
Máté Krasznai (HUN)	0

Round of 32
Ismael Borrero (CUB)	9
Mihai Mihuț (ROU)	0
Morten Thoresen (NOR)	2
Frank Stäbler (GER)	6
Atakan Yüksel (TUR)	3
Donior Islamov (MDA)	3
Rasul Chunayev (AZE)	1
Ryu Han-su (KOR)	2

Round of 16
Ismael Borrero (CUB)	11
Frank Stäbler (GER)	0
Atakan Yüksel (TUR)	1
Ryu Han-su (KOR)	5

Quarterfinals
Ismael Borrero (CUB)	3
Ryu Han-su (KOR)	1

=== Repechage ===
Repechage round 1
Hamed Tab (IRI)	3
Mihai Mihuț (ROU)	5

Repechage round 2
Chen Yan-kai (TPE)	5
Andreas Vetsch (SUI)	8
Mihai Mihuț (ROU)	1
Frank Stäbler (GER)	9

Repechage round 3
Andreas Vetsch (SUI)	0
Mate Nemeš (SRB)	3
Frank Stäbler (GER)	2
Ryu Han-su (KOR)	1

Bronze medals
Mate Nemeš (SRB)	10
Fredrik Bjerrehuus (DEN)	0
Frank Stäbler (GER)	6
Mohamed Ibrahim El-Sayed (EGY)	5
