= 2017 World Wrestling Championships – Men's Greco-Roman 66 kg =

Men's Greco-Roman 66 kg at the 2017 World Championships
- Venue: AccorHotels Arena
- Dates: 22 August 2017
- Competitors: 36 from 36 nations

Medalists
gold medal	Ryu Han-su	South Korea
silver medal	Mateusz Bernatek	Poland
bronze medal	Artem Surkov	Russia
bronze medal	Atakan Yüksel	Turkey

The men's Greco-Roman 66 kilograms is a competition featured at the 2017 World Wrestling Championships, and was held in Paris, France on 22 August 2017.

== Results ==
Legend

- F — Won by fall

=== Finals ===
Semifinals		Final
Artem Surkov (RUS)	1
Ryu Han-su (KOR)	2	Ryu Han-su (KOR)	2
Mateusz Bernatek (POL)	4	Mateusz Bernatek (POL)	1
Mohammad Eliasi (IRI)	1

=== Top half ===
==== Section 1 ====
Round of 64

Round of 32
Artem Surkov (RUS)	8
Hrachia Malkhasian (FRA)	0
Elmurat Tasmuradov (UZB)	2
Matthias Maasch (GER)	1
Ellis Coleman (USA)	8
Diego Romanelli (BRA)	0
Mate Nemeš (SRB)	2
Donior Islamov (MDA)	1

Round of 16
Artem Surkov (RUS)	9
Elmurat Tasmuradov (UZB)	4
Ellis Coleman (USA)	1
Mate Nemeš (SRB)	3

Quarterfinals
Artem Surkov (RUS)	9
Mate Nemeš (SRB)	0

==== Section 2 ====
Round of 64

Round of 32
Flavio Freuler (SUI)	8
Christos Theodorakis (GRE)	0
Kamran Mammadov (AZE)	1
Ryu Han-su (KOR)	2
Goga Gogiberashvili (GEO)	3
Máté Krasznai (HUN)	3
Mohamed Abouhalima (EGY)	0
Karen Aslanyan (ARM)	8

Round of 16
Flavio Freuler (SUI)	2
Ryu Han-su (KOR)	5
Máté Krasznai (HUN)	2
Karen Aslanyan (ARM)	4

Quarterfinals
Ryu Han-su (KOR)	2
Karen Aslanyan (ARM)	1

=== Bottom half ===
==== Section 3 ====
Round of 64

Round of 32
Atakan Yüksel (TUR)	1
Mateusz Bernatek (POL)	2
Michal Novák (CZE)	2
Jiang Yuan (CHN)	1
Mario Molina (PER)	3
Hung Ying-hua (TPE)	1
Aleksandrs Jurkjans (LAT)	1
Danijel Janečić (CRO)	2

Round of 16
Mateusz Bernatek (POL)	9
Michal Novák (CZE)	1
Mario Molina (PER)	1
Danijel Janečić (CRO)	3

Quarterfinals
Mateusz Bernatek (POL)	2
Danijel Janečić (CRO)	1

==== Section 4 ====
Round of 64
Kristupas Šleiva (LTU)	4
Konstantin Stas (BUL)	11
Soslan Daurov (BLR)	1
Mohammad Eliasi (IRI)	2
Almat Kebispayev (KAZ)	5
Miguel Martínez (CUB)	2
Ravinder Singh (IND)	1
Hussam Omar (SWE)	2

Round of 32
Denys Demyankov (UKR)	2
Zhanat Kyilybaev (KGZ)	1
Fredrik Bjerrehuus (DEN)	2
Shogo Takahashi (JPN)	2
Konstantin Stas (BUL)	1
Mohammad Eliasi (IRI)	10
Almat Kebispayev (KAZ)	6^{F}
Hussam Omar (SWE)	0

Round of 16
Denys Demyankov (UKR)	2
Shogo Takahashi (JPN)	1
Mohammad Eliasi (IRI)	4
Almat Kebispayev (KAZ)	1

Quarterfinals
Denys Demyankov (UKR)	1
Mohammad Eliasi (IRI)	4

=== Repechage ===
Repechage round 2
Kamran Mammadov (AZE)	4
Flavio Freuler (SUI)	1
Atakan Yüksel (TUR)	7
Michal Novák (CZE)	1

Repechage round 3
Kamran Mammadov (AZE)	1
Karen Aslanyan (ARM)	7^{F}
Atakan Yüksel (TUR)	2
Danijel Janečić (CRO)	1

Bronze medals
Karen Aslanyan (ARM)	1
Artem Surkov (RUS)	2
Atakan Yüksel (TUR)	2
Mohammad Eliasi (IRI)	1
