= 2018 World Wrestling Championships – Men's Greco-Roman 67 kg =

Men's Greco-Roman 67 kg at the 2018 World Championships
- Venue: László Papp Budapest Sports Arena
- Dates: 26–27 October 2018
- Competitors: 33 from 33 nations

Medalists
gold medal	Artem Surkov	Russia
silver medal	Davor Štefanek	Serbia
bronze medal	Meirzhan Shermakhanbet	Kazakhstan
bronze medal	Gevorg Sahakyan	Poland

The men's Greco-Roman 67 kilograms is a competition featured at the 2018 World Wrestling Championships, and was held in Budapest, Hungary on 26 and 27 October.

== Results ==
Legend

- F — Won by fall

=== Finals ===
Semifinals		Final
Meirzhan Shermakhanbet (KAZ)	1
Artem Surkov (RUS)	3	Artem Surkov (RUS)	7
Davor Štefanek (SRB)	8	Davor Štefanek (SRB)	0
Gevorg Sahakyan (POL)	0

=== Top half ===
==== Section 1 ====
Round of 64

Round of 32
Ismael Borrero (CUB)	6
Mirzobek Rakhmatov (UZB)	1
Atakan Yüksel (TUR)	0
Meirzhan Shermakhanbet (KAZ)	12
Mohammad Reza Geraei (IRI)	7^{F}
Mostafa Hassan Mohamed (EGY)	0
Amantur Ismailov (KGZ)	2
Shmagi Bolkvadze (GEO)	4

Round of 16
Ismael Borrero (CUB)	6
Meirzhan Shermakhanbet (KAZ)	11^{F}
Mohammad Reza Geraei (IRI)	4
Shmagi Bolkvadze (GEO)	4

Quarterfinals
Meirzhan Shermakhanbet (KAZ)	9
Mohammad Reza Geraei (IRI)	0

==== Section 2 ====
Round of 64

Round of 32
Ryu Han-su (KOR)	2
Denys Demyankov (UKR)	4
Kamran Mammadov (AZE)	2
Karen Aslanyan (ARM)	2
Mamadassa Sylla (FRA)	0
Artem Surkov (RUS)	7
Ellis Coleman (USA)	3^{F}
Edgaras Venckaitis (LTU)	5

Round of 16
Denys Demyankov (UKR)	3
Kamran Mammadov (AZE)	7
Artem Surkov (RUS)	3
Ellis Coleman (USA)	1

Quarterfinals
Kamran Mammadov (AZE)	1
Artem Surkov (RUS)	5

=== Bottom half ===
==== Section 3 ====
Round of 64

Round of 32
Danijel Janečić (CRO)	0
Davor Štefanek (SRB)	9
Seýdylla Täzäýew (TKM)	4
Hung Ying-hua (TPE)	12
Máté Krasznai (HUN)	6
Tian Qiye (CHN)	5
Fredrik Bjerrehuus (DEN)	9
Mario Molina (PER)	0

Round of 16
Davor Štefanek (SRB)	10
Hung Ying-hua (TPE)	0
Máté Krasznai (HUN)	0
Fredrik Bjerrehuus (DEN)	4^{F}

Quarterfinals
Davor Štefanek (SRB)	4^{F}
Fredrik Bjerrehuus (DEN)	0

==== Section 4 ====
Round of 64
Manish (IND)	3
Aleksandrs Jurkjans (LAT)	1

Round of 32
Gevorg Sahakyan (POL)	5
Erik Weiß (GER)	3
Manuel López (MEX)	6
Konstantin Stas (BUL)	4
Ignazio Sanfilippo (ITA)	9
Yerko Castro (BOL)	0
Manish (IND)	0
Tsuchika Shimoyamada (JPN)	9

Round of 16
Gevorg Sahakyan (POL)	9
Manuel López (MEX)	0
Ignazio Sanfilippo (ITA)	0
Tsuchika Shimoyamada (JPN)	8

Quarterfinals
Gevorg Sahakyan (POL)	7^{F}
Tsuchika Shimoyamada (JPN)	0

=== Repechage ===
Repechage round 2
Mamadassa Sylla (FRA)	5
Ellis Coleman (USA)	3
Danijel Janečić (CRO)	13
Hung Ying-hua (TPE)	4

Repechage round 3
Mamadassa Sylla (FRA)	4
Kamran Mammadov (AZE)	3
Danijel Janečić (CRO)	10
Fredrik Bjerrehuus (DEN)	3

Bronze medals
Mamadassa Sylla (FRA)	0
Meirzhan Shermakhanbet (KAZ)	9
Danijel Janečić (CRO)	0
Gevorg Sahakyan (POL)	7
