= 2017 European Wrestling Championships – Men's Greco-Roman 66 kg =

The Men's Greco-Roman 66 kg is a competition featured at the 2017 European Wrestling Championships, and was held in Novi Sad, Serbia on May 6.

== Medalists ==
Gold	Artem Surkov; Russia
Silver	Davor Štefanek; Serbia
Bronze	Goga Gogiberashvili; Georgia
Bronze	Soslan Daurov; Belarus

== Results ==
Legend

- F — Won by fall

=== Final ===
Final
Artem Surkov (RUS)	12
Davor Štefanek (SRB)	1

=== Top half ===
==== Section 1 ====
Round of 32

Round of 16
Atakan Yüksel (TUR)	3
Karen Aslanyan (ARM)	1
Sanan Suleymanov (AZE)	6
Parviz Nasibov (UKR)	1
Hrachia Malkhasian (FRA)	0
Mateusz Bernatek (POL)	6
Artem Surkov (RUS)	7
Goga Gogiberashvili (GEO)	4

Quarterfinals
Atakan Yüksel (TUR)	3
Sanan Suleymanov (AZE)	1
Mateusz Bernatek (POL)	1
Artem Surkov (RUS)	5

Semifinals
Atakan Yüksel (TUR)	0
Artem Surkov (RUS)	2

=== Bottom half ===
Round of 32
Fredrik Bjerrehuus (DEN)	3
Danijel Janečić (CRO)	4
Pål Eirik Gundersen (NOR)	4
Michael Widmayer (GER)	2
Oskar Erlandsson (SWE)	0
Mihai Mihut (ROU)	9
Michal Novák (CZE)	1
Deyvid Dimitrov (BUL)	10
Kristupas Šleiva (LTU)	2
Máté Krasznai (HUN)	10
Valentin Petic (MDA)	0
Aleksandrs Jurkjans (LAT)	4
Davor Štefanek (SRB)	11
Andreas Vetsch (SUI)	0

Round of 16
Soslan Daurov (BLR)	5
Danijel Janečić (CRO)	1
Pål Eirik Gundersen (NOR)	2
Mihai Mihut (ROU)	2
Deyvid Dimitrov (BUL)	1
Máté Krasznai (HUN)	5
Aleksandrs Jurkjans (LAT)	2
Davor Štefanek (SRB)	5

Quarterfinals
Soslan Daurov (BLR)	8
Mihai Mihut (ROU)	0
Máté Krasznai (HUN)	0
Davor Štefanek (SRB)	10^{F}

Semifinals
Soslan Daurov (BLR)	1
Davor Štefanek (SRB)	4

=== Repechage ===
Repechage round 1
Andreas Vetsch (SUI)	1
Aleksandrs Jurkjans (LAT)	3

Repechage round 2
Goga Gogiberashvili (GEO)	4
Mateusz Bernatek (POL)	3
Aleksandrs Jurkjans (LAT)	4
Máté Krasznai (HUN)	7

Bronze medals
Goga Gogiberashvili (GEO)	6
Atakan Yüksel (TUR)	3
Máté Krasznai (HUN)	2
Soslan Daurov (BLR)	8
