= 2019 European Wrestling Championships – Men's Greco-Roman 67 kg =

The Men's Greco-Roman 67 kg is a competition featured at the 2019 European Wrestling Championships, and was held in Bucharest, Romania on April 13 and April 14.

== Medalists ==
Gold	Atakan Yüksel; Turkey
Silver	Gevorg Sahakyan; Poland
Bronze	Karen Aslanyan; Armenia
Bronze	Artem Surkov; Russia

== Results ==
Legend

- F — Won by fall

=== Final ===
Final
Gevorg Sahakyan (POL)	1
Atakan Yüksel (TUR)	5

=== Top half ===
Round of 32
Gevorg Sahakyan (POL)	4
Karen Aslanyan (ARM)	0

Round of 16
Mate Nemeš (SRB)	10
Denis Bolunov (EST)	2
Kamran Mammadov (AZE)	5
Fredrik Bjerrehuus (DEN)	0
Konstantin Stas (BUL)	12
Håvard Jørgensen (NOR)	7
Yaraslau Kardash (BLR)	1
Gevorg Sahakyan (POL)	8^{F}

Quarterfinals
Mate Nemeš (SRB)	2
Kamran Mammadov (AZE)	1
Konstantin Stas (BUL)	0
Gevorg Sahakyan (POL)	2

Semifinals
Mate Nemeš (SRB)	3
Gevorg Sahakyan (POL)	5

=== Bottom half ===
Round of 32
Atakan Yüksel (TUR)	9
Pedro Caldas (POR)	0
Daniel Soini (SWE)	2
Andreas Vetsch (SUI)	4
Artem Surkov (RUS)	10
Kristupas Šleiva (LTU)	0
Christoph Burger (AUT)	12^{F}
Ignazio Sanfilippo (ITA)	3
Parviz Nasibov (UKR)	4
Alexandru Solomon (ROU)	1
Máté Krasznai (HUN)	9
Valentin Petic (MDA)	1
Yasin Özay (FRA)	4
Sachino Davitaia (GEO)	6
Erik Weiß (GER)	3
Aleksandrs Jurkjans (LAT)	2

Round of 16
Atakan Yüksel (TUR)	5
Andreas Vetsch (SUI)	3
Artem Surkov (RUS)	8
Christoph Burger (AUT)	0
Parviz Nasibov (UKR)	3
Máté Krasznai (HUN)	0
Sachino Davitaia (GEO)	9
Erik Weiß (GER)	0

Quarterfinals
Atakan Yüksel (TUR)	2
Artem Surkov (RUS)	2
Parviz Nasibov (UKR)	1
Sachino Davitaia (GEO)	2

Semifinals
Atakan Yüksel (TUR)	3
Sachino Davitaia (GEO)	1

=== Repechage ===
Repechage round 1
Karen Aslanyan (ARM)	11
Yaraslau Kardash (BLR)	1
Pedro Caldas (POR)	2
Andreas Vetsch (SUI)	11

Repechage round 2
Karen Aslanyan (ARM)	8
Konstantin Stas (BUL)	0
Andreas Vetsch (SUI)	0
Artem Surkov (RUS)	10

Bronze medal match
Karen Aslanyan (ARM)	4
Mate Nemeš (SRB)	2
Artem Surkov (RUS)	2
Sachino Davitaia (GEO)	1
