= 2025 World Wrestling Championships – Men's Greco-Roman 63 kg =

Wrestling competitions

Men's Greco-Roman 63 kg at the 2025 World Championships
- Venue: Arena Zagreb
- Dates: 20–21 September 2025
- Competitors: 26 from 25 nations

Medalists
gold medal	Aytjan Khalmakhanov	Uzbekistan
silver medal	Chung Han-jae	South Korea
bronze medal	Mohammad Mehdi Keshtkar	Iran
bronze medal	Vitalie Eriomenco	Moldova

The men's Greco-Roman 63 kilograms is a competition featured at the 2025 World Wrestling Championships, and was held in Zagreb, Croatia on 20 and 21 September 2025.

This Greco-Roman wrestling competition consists of a single-elimination tournament, with a repechage used to determine the winner of two bronze medals. The two finalists face off for gold and silver medals. Each wrestler who loses to one of the two finalists moves into the repechage, culminating in a pair of bronze medal matches, featuring the semifinal losers each facing the remaining repechage opponent from their half of the bracket.

== Results ==
Legend

- F — Won by fall
- WO — Won by walkover

=== Final ===
Final
Chung Han-jae (KOR)	0
Aytjan Khalmakhanov (UZB)	6

=== Top half ===
Round of 32
Sergey Emelin (UWW)	1
Leri Abuladze (GEO)	1
Abdeldjebar Djebbari (ALG)	2
Manato Nakamura (JPN)	8^{F}
Ivan Lizatović (CRO)	1
Chung Han-jae (KOR)	7
Morten Thoresen (NOR)	6
Huang Baosheng (CHN)	8
Murad Mammadov (AZE)	8
Baiaman Karimov (KGZ)	5

Round of 16
Karen Aslanyan (ARM)	3
Sergey Emelin (UWW)	7
Manato Nakamura (JPN)	0
Chung Han-jae (KOR)	6^{F}
Mohammad Mehdi Keshtkar (IRI)	2
Huang Baosheng (CHN)	1
Murad Mammadov (AZE)	5
Kerem Kamal (TUR)	3

Quarterfinals
Sergey Emelin (UWW)	1
Chung Han-jae (KOR)	1
Mohammad Mehdi Keshtkar (IRI)	8
Murad Mammadov (AZE)	0

Semifinals
Chung Han-jae (KOR)	5
Mohammad Mehdi Keshtkar (IRI)	3

=== Bottom half ===
Round of 32
Stefan Clément (FRA)	2
Kim Chan (PRK)	7
Nikolay Vichev (BUL)	0
Oleksandr Hrushyn (UKR)	8
Ellis Coleman (USA)	10
Moamen Ahmed Mohamed (EGY)	2
Héctor Sánchez (MEX)	1
Azatjan Açilow (TKM)	6^{F}
Aref Mohammadi (QAT)	3
Sunny Kumar (IND)	1

Round of 16
Yerzhet Zharlykassyn (KAZ)	4
Kim Chan (PRK)	3
Oleksandr Hrushyn (UKR)	1
Aytjan Khalmakhanov (UZB)	5
Ellis Coleman (USA)	1
Azatjan Açilow (TKM)	12
Aref Mohammadi (QAT)	1
Vitalie Eriomenco (MDA)	4

Quarterfinals
Yerzhet Zharlykassyn (KAZ)	0
Aytjan Khalmakhanov (UZB)	8
Azatjan Açilow (TKM)	1
Vitalie Eriomenco (MDA)	3

Semifinals
Aytjan Khalmakhanov (UZB)	8
Vitalie Eriomenco (MDA)	0

=== Repechage ===
Repechage round 1
Ivan Lizatović (CRO)	WO
Manato Nakamura (JPN)

Repechage round 2
Ivan Lizatović (CRO)	1
Sergey Emelin (UWW)	6
Oleksandr Hrushyn (UKR)	6
Yerzhet Zharlykassyn (KAZ)	3

Bronze medals
Sergey Emelin (UWW)	4
Mohammad Mehdi Keshtkar (IRI)	6
Oleksandr Hrushyn (UKR)	5
Vitalie Eriomenco (MDA)	6

== Final standing ==
Rank	Athlete
1st place, gold medalist(s)	Aytjan Khalmakhanov (UZB)
2nd place, silver medalist(s)	Chung Han-jae (KOR)
3rd place, bronze medalist(s)	Mohammad Mehdi Keshtkar (IRI)
3rd place, bronze medalist(s)	Vitalie Eriomenco (MDA)
5	Sergey Emelin (UWW)
5	Oleksandr Hrushyn (UKR)
7	Azatjan Açilow (TKM)
8	Ivan Lizatović (CRO)
9	Murad Mammadov (AZE)
10	Manato Nakamura (JPN)
11	Ellis Coleman (USA)
12	Kim Chan (PRK)
13	Huang Baosheng (CHN)
14	Yerzhet Zharlykassyn (KAZ)
15	Aref Mohammadi (QAT)
16	Morten Thoresen (NOR)
17	Baiaman Karimov (KGZ)
18	Kerem Kamal (TUR)
19	Karen Aslanyan (ARM)
20	Stefan Clément (FRA)
21	Moamen Ahmed Mohamed (EGY)
22	Leri Abuladze (GEO)
23	Sunny Kumar (IND)
24	Abdeldjebar Djebbari (ALG)
25	Héctor Sánchez (MEX)
26	Nikolay Vichev (BUL)
