= Wrestling at the 2020 Summer Olympics – Men's Greco-Roman 67 kg =

Men's Greco-Roman 67 kg at the Games of the XXXII Olympiad
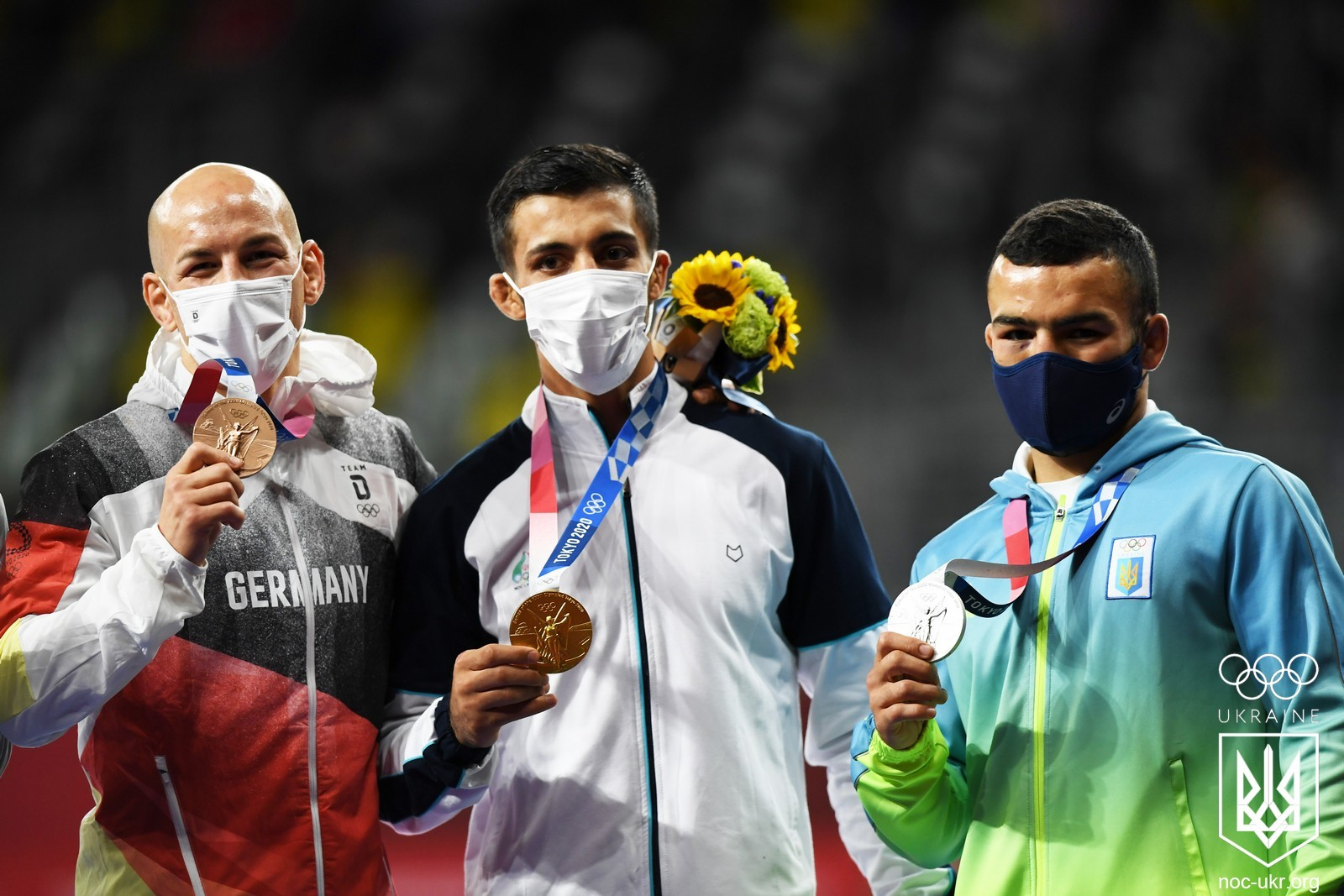
- Venue: Makuhari Messe
- Date: 3–4 August 2021
- Competitors: 17 from 17 nations

Medalists
1st place, gold medalist(s)		Mohammad Reza Geraei	Iran
2nd place, silver medalist(s)		Parviz Nasibov	Ukraine
3rd place, bronze medalist(s)		Frank Stäbler	Germany
3rd place, bronze medalist(s)		Mohamed Ibrahim El-Sayed	Egypt

The men's Greco-Roman 67 kilograms competition at the 2020 Summer Olympics in Tokyo, Japan, took place on 3–4 August 2021 at the Makuhari Messe in Mihama-ku.

This freestyle wrestling competition consists of a single-elimination tournament, with a repechage used to determine the winner of two bronze medals. The two finalists face off for gold and silver medals. Each wrestler who loses to one of the two finalists moves into the repechage, culminating in a pair of bronze medal matches featuring the semifinal losers each facing the remaining repechage opponent from their half of the bracket.

== Schedule ==
All times are Japan Standard Time (UTC+09:00)

Date	Time	Event
3 August 2021	11:00	Qualification rounds
3 August 2021	18:15	Semifinals
4 August 2021	11:00	Repechage
4 August 2021	19:30	Finals

== Results ==
=== Final ===
Final
Mohammad Reza Geraei (IRI)	9
Parviz Nasibov (UKR)	1

=== Top half ===
Qualifications

1/8 finals
Ismael Borrero (CUB)	2
Ramaz Zoidze (GEO)	3
Souleymen Nasr (TUN)	0
Aker Al-Obaidi (EOR)	8
Julián Horta (COL)	0
Mohammad Reza Geraei (IRI)	8
Frank Stäbler (GER)	4
Mate Nemeš (SRB)	1

1/4 finals
Ramaz Zoidze (GEO)	10
Aker Al-Obaidi (EOR)	0
Mohammad Reza Geraei (IRI)	5
Frank Stäbler (GER)	5

Semifinals
Ramaz Zoidze (GEO)	1
Mohammad Reza Geraei (IRI)	6

=== Bottom half ===
Qualifications
Abdelmalek Merabet (ALG)	0
Ryu Han-su (KOR)	8

1/8 finals
Artem Surkov (ROC)	10
Alejandro Sancho (USA)	4
Parviz Nasibov (UKR)	5
Fredrik Bjerrehuus (DEN)	1
Karen Aslanyan (ARM)	1
Bálint Korpási (HUN)	1
Ryu Han-su (KOR)	6
Mohamed Ibrahim El-Sayed (EGY)	7

1/4 finals
Artem Surkov (ROC)	1
Parviz Nasibov (UKR)	1
Karen Aslanyan (ARM)	7
Mohamed Ibrahim El-Sayed (EGY)	7

Semifinals
Parviz Nasibov (UKR)	7
Mohamed Ibrahim El-Sayed (EGY)	6

=== Repechage ===
Repechage round 2
Julián Horta (COL)	0
Frank Stäbler (GER)	8
Fredrik Bjerrehuus (DEN)	0
Artem Surkov (ROC)	7

Bronze medal matches
Frank Stäbler (GER)	5
Ramaz Zoidze (GEO)	4
Artem Surkov (ROC)	1
Mohamed Ibrahim El-Sayed (EGY)	1

== Final standing ==
Rank	Athlete
1st place, gold medalist(s)	Mohammad Reza Geraei (IRI)
2nd place, silver medalist(s)	Parviz Nasibov (UKR)
3rd place, bronze medalist(s)	Frank Stäbler (GER)
3rd place, bronze medalist(s)	Mohamed Ibrahim El-Sayed (EGY)
5	Ramaz Zoidze (GEO)
5	Artem Surkov (ROC)
7	Ryu Han-su (KOR)
8	Aker Al-Obaidi (EOR)
9	Karen Aslanyan (ARM)
10	Alejandro Sancho (USA)
11	Ismael Borrero (CUB)
12	Bálint Korpási (HUN)
13	Mate Nemeš (SRB)
14	Fredrik Bjerrehuus (DEN)
15	Souleymen Nasr (TUN)
16	Abdelmalek Merabet (ALG)
17	Julián Horta (COL)
