= 2018 European Wrestling Championships – Men's Greco-Roman 67 kg =

Wrestling

The Men's Greco-Roman 67 kg is a competition featured at the 2018 European Wrestling Championships, and was held in Kaspiysk, Russia on May 1 and May 2.

== Medalists ==
| Gold | Artem Surkov; Russia |
| Silver | Shmagi Bolkvadze; Georgia |
| Bronze | Karen Aslanyan; Armenia |
| Bronze | Enes Başar; Turkey |

== Results ==
Legend

- C — Won by 3 cautions given to the opponent
- F — Won by fall

=== Final ===
| Final |
| Artem Surkov (RUS) | 8^{F} |
| Shmagi Bolkvadze (GEO) | 0 |

=== Top half ===
Round of 32

Round of 16
Elman Mukhtarov (AZE) | 0
Artem Surkov (RUS) | 9
Mate Nemeš (SRB) | 3
Karen Aslanyan (ARM) | 5
Soslan Daurov (BLR) | 2
Deyvid Dimitrov (BUL) | 11
Valeriu Toderean (MDA) | 0
Dawid Kareciński (POL) | 7

Quarterfinals
Artem Surkov (RUS) | 6
Karen Aslanyan (ARM) | 3
Deyvid Dimitrov (BUL) | 1
Dawid Kareciński (POL) | 3

Semifinals
Artem Surkov (RUS) | 3
Dawid Kareciński (POL) | 1

=== Bottom half ===
Round of 32
István Kozák (HUN) | 2
Fredrik Bjerrehuus (DEN) | 3
Aleksandrs Jurkjans (LAT) | 0
Morten Thoresen (NOR) | 4
Dmytro Tsymbaliuk (UKR) | 0
Yasin Özay (FRA) | 5^{C}
Hussam Omar (SWE) | 2
Erik Weiß (GER) | 10

Round of 16
Edgaras Venckaitis (LTU) | 8
Michal Novák (CZE) | 5
Shmagi Bolkvadze (GEO) | 6
Enes Başar (TUR) | 0
Fredrik Bjerrehuus (DEN) | 5
Morten Thoresen (NOR) | 3
Yasin Özay (FRA) | 4
Erik Weiß (GER) | 4

Quarterfinals
Edgaras Venckaitis (LTU) | 0
Shmagi Bolkvadze (GEO) | 2
Fredrik Bjerrehuus (DEN) | 5
Erik Weiß (GER) | 0

Semifinals
Shmagi Bolkvadze (GEO) | 5
Fredrik Bjerrehuus (DEN) | 0

=== Repechage ===
Repechage round 2
Elman Mukhtarov (AZE) | 3
Karen Aslanyan (ARM) | 5
Enes Başar (TUR) | 5
Edgaras Venckaitis (LTU) | 3

Bronze medals
Karen Aslanyan (ARM) | 7
Dawid Kareciński (POL) | 2
Enes Başar (TUR) | 5
Fredrik Bjerrehuus (DEN) | 4
