= 2019 Dan Kolov & Nikola Petrov Tournament =

- Host city: Ruse, Bulgaria
- Dates: 28 February-03 March 2019

Champions
- Freestyle: United States
- Greco-Roman: Russia
- Women: China

The 57th Dan Kolov & Nikola Petrov Tournament was a sport wrestling event held in Ruse, Bulgaria between 28 February-3 March 2019. It was held as the fourth of the ranking series of United World Wrestling.

This international tournament includes competition in both men's and women's freestyle wrestling and men's Greco-Roman wrestling. This tournament is held in honor of Dan Kolov who was the first European freestyle wrestling champion from Bulgaria and European and World Champion Nikola Petroff.

== Medal table ==
Rank	Nation	Gold	Silver	Bronze	Total
1	Russia	8	4	5	17
2	United States	4	2	6	12
3	India	2	4	0	6
4	China	2	3	5	10
5	Turkey	2	1	5	8
6	Iran	2	0	1	3
6	Poland	2	0	1	3
8	Ukraine	1	3	4	8
9	Kazakhstan	1	2	6	9
10	Bulgaria	1	2	3	6
11	Georgia	1	1	1	3
12	Kyrgyzstan	1	0	5	6
13	Armenia	1	0	0	1
13	Greece	1	0	0	1
13	Sweden	1	0	0	1
16	Japan	0	2	0	2
16	Uzbekistan	0	2	0	2
18	Belarus	0	1	3	4
19	Egypt	0	1	0	1
19	Norway	0	1	0	1
19	Romania	0	1	0	1
22	Germany	0	0	2	2
23	Brazil	0	0	1	1
23	France	0	0	1	1
23	Hungary	0	0	1	1
23	Italy	0	0	1	1
23	Moldova	0	0	1	1
23	Serbia	0	0	1	1
23	Slovakia	0	0	1	1
Totals (29 entries)		30	30	54	114

== Team ranking ==
Rank	Men's freestyle		Men's Greco-Roman		Women's freestyle	
Rank	Team	Points	Team	Points	Team	Points
1	United States	147	Russia	211	China	112
2	Russia	115	Kyrgyzstan	105	Ukraine	92
3	Turkey	100	Bulgaria	99	United States	77
4	Ukraine	88	China	93	Turkey	75
5	Georgia	80	Kazakhstan	91	India	65

== Medal overview ==
=== Men's freestyle ===
Event	Gold	Silver	Bronze
57 kg	Beka Bujiashvili; Georgia	Süleyman Atlı; Turkey	Georgi Vangelov; Bulgaria
57 kg	Beka Bujiashvili; Georgia	Süleyman Atlı; Turkey	Armen Arakelian; Ukraine
61 kg	Nurislam Sanayev; Kazakhstan	Sandeep Tomar; India	Aryan Tsiutryn; Russia
61 kg	Nurislam Sanayev; Kazakhstan	Sandeep Tomar; India	Vladimir Burukov; Ukraine
65 kg	Bajrang Punia; India	Jordan Oliver; United States	Niurgun Skriabin; Belarus
65 kg	Bajrang Punia; India	Jordan Oliver; United States	Bernard Futrell; United States
70 kg	Ilyas Bekbulatov; Russia	Anzor Zakuev; Russia	Viktor Rassadin; Russia
70 kg	Ilyas Bekbulatov; Russia	Anzor Zakuev; Russia	James Green; United States
74 kg	Jordan Burroughs; United States	Bekzod Abdurakhmonov; Uzbekistan	Frank Chamizo; Italy
74 kg	Jordan Burroughs; United States	Bekzod Abdurakhmonov; Uzbekistan	Yakup Gör; Turkey
79 kg	Alex Dieringer; United States	Omarashkab Nazhmudinov; Romania	Nika Kentchadze; Georgia
79 kg	Alex Dieringer; United States	Omarashkab Nazhmudinov; Romania	Atsamaz Sanakoev; Russia
86 kg	Hassan Yazdani; Iran	Ali Shabanau; Belarus	Boris Makoev; Slovakia
86 kg	Hassan Yazdani; Iran	Ali Shabanau; Belarus	Akhmed Aibuev; France
92 kg	Magomed Kurbanov; Russia	Irakli Mtsituri; Georgia	Michael Macchiavello; United States
92 kg	Magomed Kurbanov; Russia	Irakli Mtsituri; Georgia	İbrahim Bölükbaşı; Turkey
97 kg	Kyle Snyder; United States	Valerii Andriitsev; Ukraine	Murazi Mchedlidze; Ukraine
97 kg	Kyle Snyder; United States	Valerii Andriitsev; Ukraine	Reza Yazdani; Iran
125 kg	Parviz Hadi; Iran	Aleksander Khotsianivski; Ukraine	Said Gamidov; Russia
125 kg	Parviz Hadi; Iran	Aleksander Khotsianivski; Ukraine	Dániel Ligeti; Hungary

=== Greco-Roman ===
Event	Gold	Silver	Bronze
55 kg	Vitali Kabaloev; Russia	Khorlan Zhakansha; Kazakhstan	Hasan Sulaimanov; Kyrgyzstan
55 kg	Vitali Kabaloev; Russia	Khorlan Zhakansha; Kazakhstan	Amangali Bekbolatov; Kazakhstan
60 kg	Sergey Emelin; Russia	Walihan Sailike; China	Zholaman Sharshenbekov; Kyrgyzstan
60 kg	Sergey Emelin; Russia	Walihan Sailike; China	Rustam Teiishov; Kyrgyzstan
63 kg	Stepan Maryanyan; Russia	Shinobu Ota; Japan	Rahman Bilici; Turkey
63 kg	Stepan Maryanyan; Russia	Shinobu Ota; Japan	Erbatu Tuo; China
67 kg	Gevorg Sahakyan; Poland	Artem Surkov; Russia	Meirzhan Shermakhanbet; Kazakhstan
67 kg	Gevorg Sahakyan; Poland	Artem Surkov; Russia	Konstantin Stas; Bulgaria
72 kg	Abuyazid Mantsigov; Russia	Aik Mnatsakanian; Bulgaria	Ruslan Tsarev; Kyrgyzstan
72 kg	Abuyazid Mantsigov; Russia	Aik Mnatsakanian; Bulgaria	Hujun Zhang; China
77 kg	Daniel Aleksandrov; Bulgaria	Roman Vlasov; Russia	Daniel Cataraga; Moldova
77 kg	Daniel Aleksandrov; Bulgaria	Roman Vlasov; Russia	Tamerlan Shadukayev; Kazakhstan
82 kg	Aleksandr Komarov; Russia	Qian Haitao; China	Sargis Kocharyan; Brazil
82 kg	Aleksandr Komarov; Russia	Qian Haitao; China	Hasan Berk Kılınç; Turkey
87 kg	Maksim Manukyan; Armenia	Masato Sumi; Japan	Junjie Na; China
87 kg	Maksim Manukyan; Armenia	Masato Sumi; Japan	Khussein Mutsolgov; Kazakhstan
97 kg	Musa Evloev; Russia	Nikita Melnikov; Russia	Uzur Dzhuzupbekov; Kyrgyzstan
97 kg	Musa Evloev; Russia	Nikita Melnikov; Russia	Mikheil Kajaia; Serbia
130 kg	Murat Ramonov; Kyrgyzstan	Abdellatif Mohamed; Egypt	Miloslav Metodiev; Bulgaria
130 kg	Murat Ramonov; Kyrgyzstan	Abdellatif Mohamed; Egypt	Vitali Shchur; Russia

=== Women's freestyle ===
Event	Gold	Silver	Bronze
50 kg	Iwona Matkowska; Poland	Erin Golston; United States	Evin Demirhan; Turkey
50 kg	Iwona Matkowska; Poland	Erin Golston; United States	Whitney Conder; United States
53 kg	Pang Qianyu; China	Vinesh Phogat; India	Sarah Hildebrandt; United States
53 kg	Pang Qianyu; China	Vinesh Phogat; India	Vanesa Kaladzinskaya; Belarus
55 kg	Maria Prevolaraki; Greece	Marina Sedneva; Kazakhstan	Roksana Zasina; Poland
55 kg	Maria Prevolaraki; Greece	Marina Sedneva; Kazakhstan	Zhuldyz Eshimova-Turtbayeva; Kazakhstan
57 kg	Rong Ningning; China	Grace Bullen; Norway	Iryna Kurachkina; Belarus
57 kg	Rong Ningning; China	Grace Bullen; Norway	Odunayo Adekuoroye; Nigeria
59 kg	Pooja Dhanda; India	Sarita Sarita; India	X
62 kg	Yuliya Ostapchuk; Ukraine	Taybe Yusein; Bulgaria	Aisuluu Tynybekova; Kyrgyzstan
62 kg	Yuliya Ostapchuk; Ukraine	Taybe Yusein; Bulgaria	Pei Xingru; China
65 kg	Henna Johansson; Sweden	Sakshi Malik; India	Forrest Molinari; United States
65 kg	Henna Johansson; Sweden	Sakshi Malik; India	Petra Olli; Finland
68 kg	Tamyra Mensah-Stock; United States	Bakhtigul Baltaniyazova; Uzbekistan	Alla Cherkasova; Ukraine
68 kg	Tamyra Mensah-Stock; United States	Bakhtigul Baltaniyazova; Uzbekistan	Adéla Hanzlíčková; Czech Republic
72 kg	Buse Tosun; Turkey	Alina Berezhna; Ukraine	Chuchu Yan; China
72 kg	Buse Tosun; Turkey	Alina Berezhna; Ukraine	Maria Selmaier; Germany
76 kg	Yasemin Adar; Turkey	Paliha; China	Elmira Syzdykova; Kazakhstan
76 kg	Yasemin Adar; Turkey	Paliha; China	Aline Rotter-Focken; Germany

== Participating nations ==
540 competitors from 46 nations participated.

- Algeria (13)
- Argentina (6)
- Armenia (4)
- Azerbaijan (1)
- Austria (4)
- Belarus (13)
- Brazil (2)
- Bulgaria (41)
- Chile (4)
- China (31)
- Czech Republic (2)
- Egypt (18)
- Greece (1)
- Indonesia (5)
- Finland (2)
- France (4)
- Georgia (10)
- Germany (10)
- Hungary (5)
- India (12)
- Iran (4)
- Israel (1)
- Italy (11)
- Japan (12)
- Kazakhstan (29)
- Kyrgyzstan (22)
- South Korea (17)
- Lebanon (1)
- Lithuania (4)
- Moldova (12)
- North Macedonia (3)
- Nigeria (3)
- Norway (3)
- Peru (5)
- Poland (20)
- Romania (16)
- Russia (31)
- Serbia (3)
- Switzerland (1)
- Slovakia (1)
- Sweden (6)
- Tunisia (24)
- Turkey (40)
- Ukraine (29)
- United States (33)
- Uzbekistan (17)

== Ranking Series ==
Ranking Series Calendar 2019:

- 1st Ranking Series: 24–28 January, Russia, Krasnoyarsk ⇒ Golden Grand Prix Ivan Yarygin 2019 (FS, WW)
- 2nd Ranking Series: 9–10 February, Croatia, Zagreb ⇒ 2019 Grand Prix Zagreb Open (GR)
- 3rd Ranking Series: 23–24 February, Hungary, Győr ⇒ Hungarian Grand Prix - Polyák Imre Memorial (GR)
- 4th Ranking Series: 28 February-3 March, Bulgaria, Ruse ⇒ 2019 Dan Kolov & Nikola Petrov Tournament (FS, WW, GR)
- 5th Ranking Series: 23–25 May, Italy, Sassari ⇒ Matteo Pellicone Ranking Series 2019 (FS, WW, GR)
- 6th Ranking Series: 11–14 July, Turkey, Istanbul ⇒ 2019 Yasar Dogu Tournament (FS, WW)
- 7th Ranking Series: 28 February-3 March, Belarus, Minsk ⇒ 2019 Oleg Karavaev Tournament (GR)
