= Katsuaki Endo =

Japanese wrestler (born 1997)

Personal information
- Native name: 遠藤 功章
- Nationality: Japanese
- Citizenship: Japanese
- Born: 13 February 1997 (age 29) Saitama Prefecture, Japan
- Height: 175 cm (5 ft 9 in)
- Weight: 63 kg (139 lb)

Sport
- Country: Japan
- Sport: Greco-Roman wrestling
- Weight class: 67 kg
Medal record
Men's Greco-Roman wrestling
Representing Japan
Asian Championships
Bronze medal – third place	2025 Amman	67 kg
Asian Games
Gold medal – first place	2022 Hangzhou	67 kg
Grand Prix
Bronze medal – third place	2026 Zagreb	67 kg

Katsuaki Endo (遠藤 功章, Endo Katsuaki; born 13 February 1997) is a Japanese Greco-Roman wrestler. He won the gold medal in the 2022 Asian Games. He defeated Meirzhan Shermakhanbet of Kazakhstan in his gold medal match.
