= Wrestling at the 2015 European Games – Men's Greco-Roman 66 kg =

Men's Greco-Roman 66 kg at the 2015 European Games
- Venue: Heydar Aliyev Arena
- Date: 14 June
- Competitors: 29 from 29 nations

Medalists
| gold medal | Artem Surkov | Russia |
| silver medal | Mihran Harutyunyan | Armenia |
| bronze medal | Hasan Aliyev | Azerbaijan |
| bronze medal | István Lévai | Slovakia |

Men's Greco-Roman 66 kg competition at the 2015 European Games in Baku, Azerbaijan, took place on 14 June at the Heydar Aliyev Arena.

== Schedule ==
All times are Azerbaijan Summer Time (UTC+04:00)

| Date | Time | Event |
|---|---|---|
| Sunday, 14 June 2015 | 10:00 | Qualifications |
| Sunday, 14 June 2015 | 11:00 | 1/8 finals |
| Sunday, 14 June 2015 | 13:00 | Quarterfinals |
| Sunday, 14 June 2015 | 13:00 | Semifinals |
| Sunday, 14 June 2015 | 15:00 | Repechage |
| Sunday, 14 June 2015 | 19:00 | Finals |

== Results ==
Legend

- F — Won by fall

=== Final ===
| Final |
| (Armenia) Mihran Harutyunyan (ARM) | 0 |
| (Russia) Artem Surkov (RUS) | 2 |

=== Top half ===
Qualifications
(Georgia (country)) Sachino Davitaia (GEO) | 2
(Azerbaijan) Hasan Aliyev (AZE) | 4
(Spain) Ismael Navarro (ESP) | 0
(Armenia) Mihran Harutyunyan (ARM) | 6
(Moldova) Donior Islamov (MDA) | 0
(Bulgaria) Konstantin Stas (BUL) | 8
(Norway) Marius Thommesen (NOR) | 0
(Serbia) Aleksandar Maksimović (SRB) | 4
(Turkey) Abdulsamet Uğurli (TUR) | 6
(Portugal) Hugo Passos (POR) | 2

1/8 finals
(Czech Republic) Matouš Morbitzer (CZE) | 0
(Belarus) Mikhail Siamionau (BLR) | 8
(Croatia) Danijel Janečić (CRO) | 0
(Azerbaijan) Hasan Aliyev (AZE) | 5
(Armenia) Mihran Harutyunyan (ARM) | 8
(Bulgaria) Konstantin Stas (BUL) | 0
(Serbia) Aleksandar Maksimović (SRB) | 4^{F}
(Turkey) Abdulsamet Uğurli (TUR) | 4

Quarterfinals
(Belarus) Mikhail Siamionau (BLR) | 0
(Azerbaijan) Hasan Aliyev (AZE) | 3
(Armenia) Mihran Harutyunyan (ARM) | 9
(Serbia) Aleksandar Maksimović (SRB) | 1

Semifinals
(Azerbaijan) Hasan Aliyev (AZE) | 5
(Armenia) Mihran Harutyunyan (ARM) | 8

=== Bottom half ===
Qualifications
(Ukraine) Denys Dem'yankov (UKR) | 4
(Finland) Tero Välimäki (FIN) | 3
(Austria) Benedikt Puffer (AUT) | 0
(Hungary) Krisztián Jäger (HUN) | 10
(Germany) Matthias Maasch (GER) | 3
(Lithuania) Edgaras Venckaitis (LTU) | 1
(France) Artak Margaryan (FRA) | 8
(Romania) Georgian Carpen (ROU) | 7
(Russia) Artem Surkov (RUS) | 9
(Denmark) Fredrik Bjerrehuus (DEN) | 0
(Poland) Mateusz Bernatek (POL) | 3
(Sweden) Frunze Harutyunyan (SWE) | 4
(Greece) Vladimiros Matias (GRE) | 0
(Slovakia) István Lévai (SVK) | 8
(Latvia) Kristaps Kalnakārklis (LAT) | 2
(Italy) Davide Cascavilla (ITA) | 4

1/8 finals
(Ukraine) Denys Dem'yankov (UKR) | 4
(Hungary) Krisztián Jäger (HUN) | 3
(Germany) Matthias Maasch (GER) | 10
(France) Artak Margaryan (FRA) | 2
(Russia) Artem Surkov (RUS) | 8
(Sweden) Frunze Harutyunyan (SWE) | 0
(Slovakia) István Lévai (SVK) | 9
(Italy) Davide Cascavilla (ITA) | 1

Quarterfinals
(Ukraine) Denys Dem'yankov (UKR) | 4
(Germany) Matthias Maasch (GER) | 0
(Russia) Artem Surkov (RUS) | 9
(Slovakia) István Lévai (SVK) | 0

Semifinals
(Ukraine) Denys Dem'yankov (UKR) | 0
(Russia) Artem Surkov (RUS) | 2

=== Repechage ===
Repechage round 1
(Spain) Ismael Navarro (ESP) | 12
(Bulgaria) Konstantin Stas (BUL) | 7
(Denmark) Fredrik Bjerrehuus (DEN) | 8
(Sweden) Frunze Harutyunyan (SWE) | 0

Repechage round 2
(Spain) Ismael Navarro (ESP) | 0
(Serbia) Aleksandar Maksimović (SRB) | 4
(Denmark) Fredrik Bjerrehuus (DEN) | 6
(Slovakia) István Lévai (SVK) | 9

Bronze medal match
(Serbia) Aleksandar Maksimović (SRB) | 0
(Azerbaijan) Hasan Aliyev (AZE) | 4
(Slovakia) István Lévai (SVK) | 6
(Ukraine) Denys Dem'yankov (UKR) | 4
