= Wrestling at the 2022 Asian Games – Men's Greco-Roman 67 kg =

Men's Greco-Roman 67 kg at the 2022 Asian Games
- Venue: Lin'an Sports and Culture Centre
- Date: 4 October 2023
- Competitors: 13 from 13 nations

Medalists
gold medal	Katsuaki Endo	Japan
silver medal	Meirzhan Shermakhanbet	Kazakhstan
bronze medal	Danial Sohrabi	Iran
bronze medal	Razzak Beishekeev	Kyrgyzstan

The men's Greco-Roman 67 kilograms wrestling competition at the 2022 Asian Games in Hangzhou was held on 4 October 2023 at the Lin'an Sports and Culture Centre.

This Greco-Roman wrestling competition consists of a single-elimination tournament, with a repechage used to determine the winner of two bronze medals. The two finalists face off for gold and silver medals. Each wrestler who loses to one of the two finalists moves into the repechage, culminating in a pair of bronze medal matches featuring the semifinal losers each facing the remaining repechage opponent from their half of the bracket.

== Schedule ==
All times are China Standard Time (UTC+08:00)

Date	Time	Event
Wednesday, 4 October 2023	10:00	1/8 finals
Wednesday, 4 October 2023	10:00	1/4 finals
Wednesday, 4 October 2023	10:00	Semifinals
Wednesday, 4 October 2023	10:00	Repechages
Wednesday, 4 October 2023	17:00	Finals

== Results ==
Legend

- F — Won by fall

=== Main bracket ===
1/8 finals
Meirzhan Shermakhanbet (KAZ)	10
Nuttapong Hinmee (THA)	0
Danial Sohrabi (IRI)	5
Ro Yong-jin (PRK)	2
Ryu Han-su (KOR)	5
Muhammad Aliansyah (INA)	1
Neeraj Chhikara (IND)	3
Makhmud Bakhshilloev (UZB)	5
Firuz Mirzoradzhabov (TJK)	0
Katsuaki Endo (JPN)	10

1/4 finals
Li Lei (CHN)	8
Meirzhan Shermakhanbet (KAZ)	10
Danial Sohrabi (IRI)	9
Ryu Han-su (KOR)	0
Mansur Nurberdiýew (TKM)	3
Makhmud Bakhshilloev (UZB)	8
Katsuaki Endo (JPN)	5
Razzak Beishekeev (KGZ)	1

Semifinals
Meirzhan Shermakhanbet (KAZ)	6^{F}
Danial Sohrabi (IRI)	9
Makhmud Bakhshilloev (UZB)	1
Katsuaki Endo (JPN)	6

Gold medal match
Meirzhan Shermakhanbet (KAZ)	3
Katsuaki Endo (JPN)	4

=== Repechage ===
Repechage round 1
Nuttapong Hinmee (THA)	2
Li Lei (CHN)	10
Firuz Mirzoradzhabov (TJK)	0
Razzak Beishekeev (KGZ)	5^{F}

Bronze medal matches
Li Lei (CHN)	2
Danial Sohrabi (IRI)	3
Razzak Beishekeev (KGZ)	1
Makhmud Bakhshilloev (UZB)	1

== Final standing ==
Rank	Athlete
1st place, gold medalist(s)	Katsuaki Endo (JPN)
2nd place, silver medalist(s)	Meirzhan Shermakhanbet (KAZ)
3rd place, bronze medalist(s)	Danial Sohrabi (IRI)
3rd place, bronze medalist(s)	Razzak Beishekeev (KGZ)
5	Li Lei (CHN)
5	Makhmud Bakhshilloev (UZB)
7	Ryu Han-su (KOR)
8	Neeraj Chhikara (IND)
9	Mansur Nurberdiýew (TKM)
10	Ro Yong-jin (PRK)
11	Muhammad Aliansyah (INA)
12	Nuttapong Hinmee (THA)
13	Firuz Mirzoradzhabov (TJK)
