= Wrestling at the 2026 Asian Games – Men's Greco-Roman 67 kg =

Men's Greco-Roman 67 kg at the 2026 Asian Games
- Venue: Inae Sports Center
- Date: 30 September 2026
- Competitors: 14 from 14 nations

Medalists
gold medal	Aytjan Khalmakhanov	Uzbekistan
silver medal	Kyotaro Sogabe	Japan
bronze medal	Razzak Beishekeev	Kyrgyzstan
bronze medal	Meirzhan Shermakhanbet	Kazakhstan

The men's Greco-Roman 67 kilograms wrestling competition at the 2026 Asian Games in Nagoya was held on 1 October 2026 at the Inae Sports Center.

This Greco-Roman wrestling competition consists of a single-elimination tournament, with a repechage used to determine the winner of two bronze medals. The two finalists face off for gold and silver medals. Each wrestler who loses to one of the two finalists moves into the repechage, culminating in a pair of bronze medal matches featuring the semifinal losers each facing the remaining repechage opponent from their half of the bracket.

== Schedule ==
All times are Japan Standard Time (UTC+09:00)

Date	Time	Event
Wednesday, 30 September 2026	10:30	1/8 finals
Wednesday, 30 September 2026	10:30	1/4 finals
Wednesday, 30 September 2026	10:30	Semifinals
Wednesday, 30 September 2026	10:30	Repechages
Wednesday, 30 September 2026	18:00	Finals

== Results ==
Legend

- F — Won by fall

=== Main bracket ===
1/8 finals
Aref Mohammadi (QAT)	9
Nuttapong Hinmee (THA)	0
Leng Ji (CHN)	0
Aytjan Khalmakhanov (UZB)	9
Munthir Jandu (KSA)	8
Sunat Abdulloev (TJK)	1
Chung Han-jae (KOR)	3
Son Man-gwang (PRK)	3
Meirzhan Shermakhanbet (KAZ)	14
Mohammad Javad Rezaei (IRI)	5
Muhammad Aliansyah (INA)	8
Namsrain Ganbayar (MGL)	11

1/4 finals
Razzak Beishekeev (KGZ)	4^{F}
Aref Mohammadi (QAT)	0
Aytjan Khalmakhanov (UZB)	8
Munthir Jandu (KSA)	0
Chung Han-jae (KOR)	4
Meirzhan Shermakhanbet (KAZ)	5
Namsrain Ganbayar (MGL)	2
Kyotaro Sogabe (JPN)	10

Semifinals
Razzak Beishekeev (KGZ)	0
Aytjan Khalmakhanov (UZB)	5
Meirzhan Shermakhanbet (KAZ)	0
Kyotaro Sogabe (JPN)	8

Final
Aytjan Khalmakhanov (UZB)	3
Kyotaro Sogabe (JPN)	2

=== Repechage ===
Repechage
Leng Ji (CHN)	3
Munthir Jandu (KSA)	0

Bronze medal matches
Leng Ji (CHN)	1
Razzak Beishekeev (KGZ)	5
Namsrain Ganbayar (MGL)	0
Meirzhan Shermakhanbet (KAZ)	11

== Final standing ==
Rank	Athlete
1st place, gold medalist(s)	Aytjan Khalmakhanov (UZB)
2nd place, silver medalist(s)	Kyotaro Sogabe (JPN)
3rd place, bronze medalist(s)	Razzak Beishekeev (KGZ)
3rd place, bronze medalist(s)	Meirzhan Shermakhanbet (KAZ)
5	Leng Ji (CHN)
5	Namsrain Ganbayar (MGL)
7	Aref Mohammadi (QAT)
8	Chung Han-jae (KOR)
9	Munthir Jandu (KSA)
10	Muhammad Aliansyah (INA)
11	Mohammad Javad Rezaei (IRI)
12	Son Man-gwang (PRK)
13	Sunat Abdulloev (TJK)
14	Nuttapong Hinmee (THA)
