= 2023 U23 World Wrestling Championships – Men's Greco-Roman 63 kg =

Wrestling competitions

Men's Greco-Roman 63 kg at the 2023 U23 World Championships
- Venue: Tirana Olympic Park
- Dates: 28–29 October
- Competitors: 18 from 15 nations

Medalists
gold medal	Rakhman Tavmurzaev	Authorised Neutral Athletes
silver medal	Hleb Makaranka	Authorised Neutral Athletes
bronze medal	Chiezo Maruyama	Japan
bronze medal	Vitalie Eriomenco	Moldova

The men's Greco-Roman 63 kilograms is a competition featured at the 2023 U23 World Wrestling Championships, and was held in Tirana, Albania on 28 and 29 October 2023.

This Greco-Roman wrestling competition consists of a single-elimination tournament, with a repechage used to determine the winner of two bronze medals. The two finalists face off for gold and silver medals. Each wrestler who loses to one of the two finalists moves into the repechage, culminating in a pair of bronze medal matches featuring the semifinal losers each facing the remaining repechage opponent from their half of the bracket.

== Results ==
Legend

- F — Won by fall

=== Final ===
Final
Rakhman Tavmurzaev (ANA)	6
Hleb Makaranka (ANA)	1

=== Top half ===
Round of 32
Rayan Hawsawi (KSA)	0
Pravesh (UWW)	8

Round of 16
Jordan Hamdan (USA)	0
Rakhman Tavmurzaev (ANA)	9
Pravesh (UWW)	9
Yerzhet Zharlykassyn (KAZ)	1
Vitalie Eriomenco (MDA)	8
Tino Ojala (FIN)	0
Andrii Semenchuk (UKR)	4
Baiaman Karimov (KGZ)	11

Quarterfinals
Rakhman Tavmurzaev (ANA)	1
Pravesh (UWW)	1
Vitalie Eriomenco (MDA)	12
Baiaman Karimov (KGZ)	3

Semifinals
Rakhman Tavmurzaev (ANA)	7
Vitalie Eriomenco (MDA)	5

=== Bottom half ===
Round of 32
Daniel Dajani (ALB)	0
Mairbek Salimov (POL)	8

Round of 16
Jonas Urs Müller (SUI)	0
Yurik Hoveyan (ARM)	9
Hleb Makaranka (ANA)	3
Ziya Babashov (AZE)	3
Giorgi Shotadze (GEO)	9
Mairbek Salimov (POL)	0
İsmail Çulfa (TUR)	1
Chiezo Maruyama (JPN)	5

Quarterfinals
Yurik Hoveyan (ARM)	0
Hleb Makaranka (ANA)	8
Giorgi Shotadze (GEO)	4
Chiezo Maruyama (JPN)	5^{F}

Semifinals
Hleb Makaranka (ANA)	3
Chiezo Maruyama (JPN)	3

=== Repechage ===
Repechage round 2
Jordan Hamdan (USA)	0
Pravesh (UWW)	10
Ziya Babashov (AZE)	2
Yurik Hoveyan (ARM)	2

Bronze medals
Pravesh (UWW)	0
Vitalie Eriomenco (MDA)	9
Yurik Hoveyan (ARM)	1
Chiezo Maruyama (JPN)	2
