= 2019 Grand Prix Zagreb Open =

Wrestling event held in Zagreb, Croatia

- Host city: Zagreb, Croatia
- Dates: 9-10 February 2019
- Stadium: Dom Sportova

The 2019 Grand Prix Zagreb Open, was a wrestling event held in Zagreb, Croatia between 9 and 10 February 2019.

It was held as the second of the ranking series of United World Wrestling.

== Medal table ==
Rank	Nation	Gold	Silver	Bronze	Total
1	Uzbekistan	2	1	2	5
2	Iran	2	1	1	4
3	Hungary	2	0	1	3
4	Turkey	1	3	2	6
5	Croatia	1	0	2	3
6	Norway	1	0	0	1
6	Russia	1	0	0	1
8	Bulgaria	0	1	2	3
9	Romania	0	1	1	2
9	United States	0	1	1	2
11	Georgia	0	1	0	1
11	Sweden	0	1	0	1
13	Poland	0	0	4	4
14	Chile	0	0	1	1
14	Italy	0	0	1	1
14	South Korea	0	0	1	1
Totals (16 entries)		10	10	19	39

== Team ranking ==
Rank	Men's Greco-Roman	
Rank	Team	Points
1	Turkey	132
2	Uzbekistan	101
3	Croatia	91
4	Bulgaria	85
5	Hungary	83
6	Iran	74
7	Romania	61
8	United States	51
9	Poland	45
10	Norway	41

== Greco-Roman ==
Event	Gold	Silver	Bronze
55 kg	Poya Marz; Iran	Ekrem Öztürk; Turkey	Alexandru Botez; Romania
60 kg	Kerem Kamal; Turkey	Milad Ali Rezanezhad; Iran	Erik Torba; Hungary
60 kg	Kerem Kamal; Turkey	Milad Ali Rezanezhad; Iran	Ivan Lizatović; Croatia
63 kg	Islomjon Bakhramov; Uzbekistan	Xavier Johnson; United States	Dawid Ersetic; Poland
63 kg	Islomjon Bakhramov; Uzbekistan	Xavier Johnson; United States	Firuz Tukhtaev; Uzbekistan
67 kg	Elmurat Tasmuradov; Uzbekistan	Mihai Mihuț; Romania	Enes Başar; Turkey
67 kg	Elmurat Tasmuradov; Uzbekistan	Mihai Mihuț; Romania	Ignazio Sanfilippo; Italy
72 kg	Robert Fritsch; Hungary	Ramaz Zoidze; Georgia	Aik Mnatsakanian; Bulgaria
72 kg	Robert Fritsch; Hungary	Ramaz Zoidze; Georgia	Mateusz Bernatek; Poland
77 kg	Božo Starčević; Croatia	Yunus Emre Başar; Turkey	Mohammad Naghousi; Iran
77 kg	Božo Starčević; Croatia	Yunus Emre Başar; Turkey	Kim Hyeon-woo; South Korea
82 kg	Daniel Aleksandrov; Iran	Emrah Kuş; Turkey	Burhan Akbudak; Turkey
82 kg	Daniel Aleksandrov; Iran	Emrah Kuş; Turkey	Karlo Kodrič; Croatia
87 kg	Viktor Lőrincz; Hungary	Zakarias Berg; Sweden	Tadeusz Michalik; Poland
87 kg	Viktor Lőrincz; Hungary	Zakarias Berg; Sweden	Arkadiusz Kułynycz; Poland
97 kg	Ilia Borisov; Russia	Kiril Milov; Bulgaria	Jahongir Turdiev; Uzbekistan
97 kg	Ilia Borisov; Russia	Kiril Milov; Bulgaria	G'Angelo Hancock; United States
130 kg	Oskar Marvik; Norway	Muminjon Abdullaev; Uzbekistan	Yasmani Acosta; Chile
130 kg	Oskar Marvik; Norway	Muminjon Abdullaev; Uzbekistan	Miloslav Metodiev; Bulgaria

== Participating nations ==
152 competitors from 23 nations participated.

- Brazil (1)
- Bulgaria (7)
- Chile (2)
- Croatia (18)
- Denmark (3)
- Spain (3)
- Georgia (6)
- Germany (2)
- Hungary (15)
- Iran (8)
- Israel (1)
- Italy (6)
- South Korea (10)
- Norway (4)
- Poland (8)
- Romania (5)
- Russia (3)
- Slovenia (1)
- Serbia (4)
- Sweden (6)
- Turkey (16)
- United States (13)
- Uzbekistan (10)

== Ranking Series ==
Ranking Series Calendar 2019:

- 1st Ranking Series: 24–28 January, Russia, Krasnoyarsk ⇒ Golden Grand Prix Ivan Yarygin 2019 (FS, WW)
- 2nd Ranking Series: 9-10 February, Croatia, Zagreb ⇒ Grand Prix Zagreb Open (GR)
- 3rd Ranking Series: 23-24 February, Hungary, Győr ⇒ Hungarian Grand Prix - Polyák Imre Memorial (GR)
- 4th Ranking Series: 28 February-03 March, Bulgaria, Ruse ⇒ 2019 Dan Kolov & Nikola Petrov Tournament (FS, WW, GR)
- 5th Ranking Series: 23-25 May, Italy, Sassari ⇒ Matteo Pellicone Ranking Series 2019 (FS, WW, GR)
- 6th Ranking Series: 11–14 July, Turkey, Istanbul ⇒ 2019 Yasar Dogu Tournament (FS, WW)
- 7th Ranking Series: 28 February-03 March, Belarus, Minsk ⇒ 2019 Oleg Karavaev Tournament (GR)
