= Aytjan Khalmakhanov =

Uzbekistani Greco-Roman wrestler

Personal information
- Born: 11 January 2006 (age 20) Uzbekistan
- Height: 1.70 m (5 ft 7 in)
- Weight: 63 kg (139 lb; 9.9 st)

Sport
- Country: Uzbekistan
- Sport: Greco-Roman
- Event: 63-67 kg
Medal record
Men's Greco-Roman wrestling
Representing Uzbekistan
World Championships
Gold medal – first place	2025 Zagreb	63 kg
Silver medal – second place	2026 Astana	67 kg
Asian Games
Gold medal – first place	2026 Aichi–Nagoya	67 kg
Asian Championships
Gold medal – first place	2025 Amman	63 kg
Islamic Solidarity Games
Bronze medal – third place	2025 Riyadh	67 kg
Grand Prix
Bronze medal – third place	2025 Zagreb	63 kg
Gold medal – first place	2026 Zagreb	67 kg
U23 Asian Wrestling Championships
Gold medal – first place	2026 Da Nang	67 kg
World U20 Championships
Gold medal – first place	2025 Samokov	63 kg
World U17 Championships
Gold medal – first place	2022 Rome	51 kg
Bronze medal – third place	2023 Istanbul	55 kg
Asian U17 Championships
Bronze medal – third place	2023 Bishkek	51 kg

Aytjan Xalmaxanov (Uzbek: Aytjan Xalmaxanov; born 11 January 2006) is an Uzbekistani Greco-Roman wrestler of Kazakh ethnicity, competing in the 67 kg division. He won the gold medal at the 2025 Asian Wrestling Championships.

== Career ==
In the 2025 Asian Wrestling Championships in Amman, Jordan, after bye in the first round, he defeated North Korea's Kim Chan 9–0 in the quarterfinals and Kazakh Sultan Assetuly 16–7 with technical superiority in the semifinals to reach the final. In the final match, he defeated Iranian Mohammad Mehdi Keshtkar with 13-4 technical superiority and won the gold medal.
