= Wrestling at the 2019 Pan American Games – Men's Greco-Roman 67 kg =

Men's Greco-Roman 67 kg at the 2019 Pan American Games
- Venue: Miguel Grau Coliseum
- Dates: August 7
- Competitors: 8 from 8 nations

Medalists
Gold medal	Ismael Borrero	Cuba
Silver medal	Manuel López	Mexico
Bronze medal	Ellis Coleman	United States
Bronze medal	Nilton Soto	Peru

The Men's Greco-Roman 67 kg competition of the Wrestling events at the 2019 Pan American Games in Lima was held on August 7 at the Miguel Grau Coliseum.

== Results ==
All times are local (UTC−5)

Legend

- F — Won by fall

=== Final ===
Quarterfinals		Semifinals		Finals
Manuel López (MEX)	1
~~Shalom Villegas (VEN)~~	4	~~Shalom Villegas (VEN)~~	8
Cristhian Rivas (ECU)	3	Nilton Soto (PER)	0
Nilton Soto (PER)	3			~~Shalom Villegas (VEN)~~	0
Joílson Júnior (BRA)	3			Ismael Borrero (CUB)	12
Ellis Coleman (USA)	8^{F}	Ellis Coleman (USA)	0
Ismael Borrero (CUB)	8	Ismael Borrero (CUB)	8
Luis de León (DOM)	0

=== Repechage ===
Bronze medal match
Manuel López (MEX)	3
Nilton Soto (PER)	1
Luis de León (DOM)	1
Ellis Coleman (USA)	4^{F}
