= 2024 World Wrestling Championships – Men's Greco-Roman 63 kg =

Wrestling competitions

Men's Greco-Roman 63 kg at the 2024 World Championships
- Venue: Tirana Olympic Park
- Dates: 28–29 October 2024
- Competitors: 21 from 19 nations

Medalists
gold medal	Nihat Mammadli	Azerbaijan
silver medal	Yerzhet Zharlykassyn	Kazakhstan
bronze medal	Karen Aslanyan	Armenia
bronze medal	Sadyk Lalaev

The men's Greco-Roman 63 kilograms is a competition featured at the 2024 World Wrestling Championships, and was held in Tirana Olympic Park, Tirana, Albania on 28 and 29 October 2024.

This Greco-Roman wrestling competition consists of a single-elimination tournament, with a repechage used to determine the winner of two bronze medals. The two finalists face off for gold and silver medals. Each wrestler who loses to one of the two finalists moves into the repechage, culminating in a pair of bronze medal matches, featuring the semifinal losers each facing the remaining repechage opponent from their half of the bracket.

Each bout consists of a single round within a six-minute limit, including two halves of three minutes. The wrestler who scores more points is the winner.

== Results ==
Legend

- F — Won by fall
- WO — Won by walkover

=== Final ===
Final
Nihat Mammadli (AZE)	6
Yerzhet Zharlykassyn (KAZ)	1

=== Top half ===
Round of 32
Vitalie Eriomenco (MDA)	9
Tan Haodong (CHN)	0
Mehmet Çeker (TUR)	1
Hleb Makaranka (AIN)	4
Ildar Hafizov (USA)	0
Nihat Mammadli (AZE)	10

Round of 16
Leri Abuladze (GEO)	2
Karen Aslanyan (ARM)	5
Vitalie Eriomenco (MDA)	4
Ayata Suzuki (JPN)	3
Aleksandrs Jurkjans (LAT)	2
Hleb Makaranka (AIN)	3
Nihat Mammadli (AZE)	4^{F}
Abu Muslim Amaev (BUL)	2

Quarterfinals
Karen Aslanyan (ARM)	6
Vitalie Eriomenco (MDA)	3
Hleb Makaranka (AIN)	0
Nihat Mammadli (AZE)	5

Semifinals
Karen Aslanyan (ARM)	1
Nihat Mammadli (AZE)	6

=== Bottom half ===
Round of 32
Jurgen Uku (ALB)	6
Dastan Kadyrov (KGZ)	14
Michał Tracz (POL)	9
Chetan Sharma (IND)	0

Round of 16
Oleksandr Hrushyn (UKR)	1
Sadyk Lalaev (AIN)	3
Dastan Kadyrov (KGZ)	0
Iman Mohammadi (IRI)	8
Yerzhet Zharlykassyn (KAZ)	9
Michał Tracz (POL)	0
Munthir Jandu (KSA)	0
Stefan Clément (FRA)	10

Quarterfinals
Sadyk Lalaev (AIN)	2
Iman Mohammadi (IRI)	2
Yerzhet Zharlykassyn (KAZ)	10
Stefan Clément (FRA)	0

Semifinals
Sadyk Lalaev (AIN)	0
Yerzhet Zharlykassyn (KAZ)	8

=== Repechage ===
Repechage round 1
Ildar Hafizov (USA)	1
Abu Muslim Amaev (BUL)	7

Repechage round 2
Abu Muslim Amaev (BUL)	9
Hleb Makaranka (AIN)	6
Michał Tracz (POL)	0
Stefan Clément (FRA)	9

Bronze medals
Abu Muslim Amaev (BUL)	0
Karen Aslanyan (ARM)	8
~~Stefan Clément (FRA)~~
Sadyk Lalaev (AIN)	WO

== Final standing ==
Rank	Athlete
1st place, gold medalist(s)	Nihat Mammadli (AZE)
2nd place, silver medalist(s)	Yerzhet Zharlykassyn (KAZ)
3rd place, bronze medalist(s)	Karen Aslanyan (ARM)
3rd place, bronze medalist(s)	Sadyk Lalaev (AIN)
5	Abu Muslim Amaev (BUL)
6	Vitalie Eriomenco (MDA)
7	Hleb Makaranka (AIN)
8	Iman Mohammadi (IRI)
9	Dastan Kadyrov (KGZ)
10	Michał Tracz (POL)
11	Jurgen Uku (ALB)
12	Ayata Suzuki (JPN)
13	Aleksandrs Jurkjans (LAT)
14	Leri Abuladze (GEO)
15	Oleksandr Hrushyn (UKR)
16	Mehmet Çeker (TUR)
17	Ildar Hafizov (USA)
18	Tan Haodong (CHN)
19	Chetan Sharma (IND)
20	Munthir Jandu (KSA)
—	Stefan Clément (FRA)
