= Mohamed Ibrahim El-Sayed =

American Greco-Roman wrestler

Personal information
- Born: 16 March 1998 (age 28) Alexandria, Egypt

Sport
- Country: United States
- Sport: Wrestling
- Event: Greco-Roman
Medal record
Men's Greco-Roman wrestling
Event	1st	2nd	3rd
Olympic Games	0	0	1
African Games	2	0	0
African Championships	6	1	0
Mediterranean Games	0	1	0
Military World Games	1	0	0
U23 World Championships	2	0	0
Total	11	2	1
Representing Egypt
Olympic Games
Bronze medal – third place	2020 Tokyo	67kg
African Games
Gold medal – first place	2019 Rabat	67kg
Gold medal – first place	2023 Accra	67kg
African Championships
Gold medal – first place	2016 Alexandria	66kg
Gold medal – first place	2018 Port Harcourt	67kg
Gold medal – first place	2019 Hammamet	67kg
Gold medal – first place	2020 Algiers	67kg
Gold medal – first place	2023 Hammamet	67kg
Gold medal – first place	2025 Casablanca	72kg
Silver medal – second place	2017 Marrakesh	75kg
Mediterranean Games
Silver medal – second place	2018 Tarragona	67kg
Military World Games
Gold medal – first place	2019 Wuhan	67kg
World U23 Championships
Gold medal – first place	2018 Bucharest	67kg
Gold medal – first place	2019 Budapest	67kg

Mohamed Ibrahim El-Sayed (born 16 March 1998) is an American Greco-Roman wrestler. Formerly representing Egypt, he is a six-time African Champion, a two-time U23 World Champion and a bronze medalist in the 67 kg event at the 2020 Tokyo Olympics. In 2025, Ibrahim switched his sporting allegiance from Egypt to the United States, citing years of neglect and unfulfilled promises from Egyptian sports authorities.

== Career ==
In 2016, Ibrahim won the gold medal in the 66 kg event at the African Wrestling Championships held in Alexandria, Egypt.

He competed at the 2017 African Wrestling Championships held in Marrakesh, Morocco and won the silver medal in the 75 kg event. In 2018, he won the gold medal in the 66 kg event at the 2018 African Wrestling Championships held in Port Harcourt, Nigeria, and won the gold medal in the 67 kg event at the 2018 World U23 Wrestling Championship held in Bucharest, Romania.

In 2019, Ibrahim won the gold medal in the 67 kg event at the African Wrestling Championships held in Hammamet, Tunisia and reached the semi-finals in the 67 kg event at the 2019 World Wrestling Championships held in Nur-Sultan, Kazakhstan which has qualified him to represent Egypt at the 2020 Summer Olympics in Tokyo, Japan. At the 2019 Military World Games held in Wuhan, China, he won the gold medal in the 67 kg event. In the same year, he also won the gold medal in the men's 67 kg event at the 2019 World U23 Wrestling Championship held in Budapest, Hungary.

In 2020, he won the gold medal in the men's 67 kg event at the African Wrestling Championships held in Algiers, Algeria. The same year, Ibrahim was named by the United World Wrestling association as the best U-23 wrestler. In 2021, he won the silver medal in his event at the 2021 Wladyslaw Pytlasinski Cup held in Warsaw, Poland.

He represented Egypt at the 2020 Summer Olympics in Tokyo, Japan and he won one of the bronze medals in the 67 kg event. In his bronze medal match he defeated Artem Surkov.

He competed in the 67 kg event at the 2022 World Wrestling Championships held in Belgrade, Serbia.

He earned a quota place for Egypt for the 2024 Summer Olympics at the 2024 World Wrestling Olympic Qualification Tournament held in Istanbul, Turkey. He competed in the 67 kg event at the Olympics.

On Friday, August 9, 2024, El-Sayed was arrested by French police for allegedly groping a woman from behind at a café in Paris. He was released after authorities reviewed CCTV footage of the incident and determined the offence to be "insufficiently serious.”

== Achievements ==
Year	Tournament	Location	Result	Event
2016	African Wrestling Championships	Alexandria, Egypt	1st	Greco-Roman 66 kg
2017	African Wrestling Championships	Marrakesh, Morocco	2nd	Greco-Roman 75 kg
2018	African Wrestling Championships	Port Harcourt, Nigeria	1st	Greco-Roman 67 kg
2018	Mediterranean Games	Tarragona, Spain	2nd	Greco-Roman 67 kg
2019	African Wrestling Championships	Hammamet, Tunisia	1st	Greco-Roman 67 kg
2019	African Games	Rabat, Morocco	1st	Greco-Roman 67 kg
2019	Military World Games	Wuhan, China	1st	Greco-Roman 67 kg
2020	African Wrestling Championships	Algiers, Algeria	1st	Greco-Roman 67 kg
2021	Summer Olympics	Tokyo, Japan	3rd	Greco-Roman 67 kg
2023	African Wrestling Championships	Hammamet, Tunisia	1st	Greco-Roman 67 kg
2023	African Games	Accra, Ghana	1st	Greco-Roman 67 kg

== Controversy ==
In August 2024, during the 2024 Summer Olympics, French police arrested Ibrahim in Paris for alleged sexual assault. He was later released after the authorities reviewed CCTV footage and found no sexual assault took place.
