= Nilton Soto =

Peruvian Greco-Roman wrestler

Personal information
- Full name: Nilton Gonzalo Marcos Soto Garcia
- Born: 30 December 1997 (age 28)

Sport
- Country: Peru
- Sport: Amateur wrestling
- Weight class: 67 kg
- Event: Greco-Roman
Medal record
Men's Greco-Roman wrestling
Representing Peru
Pan American Games
Bronze medal – third place	2019 Lima	67 kg
Bronze medal – third place	2023 Santiago	67 kg
Pan American Wrestling Championships
Silver medal – second place	2025 Monterrey	72 kg
Bronze medal – third place	2022 Acapulco	67 kg
Bronze medal – third place	2026 Coralville	67 kg

Nilton Gonzalo Marcos Soto Garcia (Note: In this Spanish name, the first or paternal surname is Soto and the second or maternal family name is Garcia.) (born 30 December 1997) is a Peruvian Greco-Roman wrestler. He won one of the bronze medals in the 67 kg event at the 2019 Pan American Games held in Lima, Peru after Shalom Villegas was stripped of his silver medal. He also won a bronze medal at the 2023 Pan American Games held in Santiago, Chile.

== Career ==
In 2020, Soto competed in the Pan American Olympic Qualification Tournament, held in Ottawa, Canada, without qualifying for the 2020 Summer Olympics in Tokyo, Japan. In May 2021, he also failed to qualify for the Olympics at the World Olympic Qualification Tournament held in Sofia, Bulgaria.

Soto won one of the bronze medals in his event at the 2022 Pan American Wrestling Championships held in Acapulco, Mexico. He competed at the 2023 Pan American Wrestling Championships held in Buenos Aires, Argentina.

In 2024, he competed at the Pan American Wrestling Olympic Qualification Tournament held in Acapulco, Mexico hoping to qualify for the 2024 Summer Olympics in Paris, France. He was eliminated in his first match. Soto also competed at the 2024 World Wrestling Olympic Qualification Tournament held in Istanbul, Turkey without qualifying for the Olympics.

== Achievements ==
Year	Tournament	Location	Result	Event
2019	Pan American Games	Lima, Peru	3rd	Greco-Roman 67 kg
2022	Pan American Wrestling Championships	Acapulco, Mexico	3rd	Greco-Roman 67 kg
2023	Pan American Games	Santiago, Chile	3rd	Greco-Roman 67 kg
2025	Pan American Wrestling Championships	Monterrey, Mexico	2nd	Greco-Roman 72 kg
2026	Pan American Wrestling Championships	Coralville, United States	3rd	Greco-Roman 67 kg
