= 2025 European Wrestling Championships – Men's Greco-Roman 63 kg =

Wrestling competition

Men's Greco-Roman 63 kg at the 2025 European Wrestling Championships
- Venue: X-Bionic Sphere
- Location: Bratislava, Slovakia
- Dates: 11-12 April
- Competitors: 14

Medalists
gold medal	Kerem Kamal	Turkey
silver medal	Karen Aslanyan	Armenia
bronze medal	Mairbek Salimov	Poland
bronze medal	Vitalie Eriomenco	Moldova

The men's Greco-Roman 63 kg is a competition featured at the 2025 European Wrestling Championships, and was held in Bratislava, Slovakia on April 11 and 12.

== Results ==
Legend

- F — Won by fall

=== Main bracket ===
Round of 16
Mairbek Salimov (POL)	9
Dinislam Bammatov (UWW)	0
Andrii Semenchuk (UKR)	5
Etienne Kinsinger (GER)	3
Beka Guruli (GEO)	1
Aleksandrs Jurkjans (LAT)	5
Hleb Makaranka (UWW)	1
Murad Mammadov (AZE)	6
Ivan Lizatović (CRO)	3
Léo Tudezca (FRA)	0
Kerem Kamal (TUR)	6
Tino Ojala (FIN)	0

Quarterfinals
Karen Aslanyan (ARM)	8
Mairbek Salimov (POL)	0
Andrii Semenchuk (UKR)	5
Aleksandrs Jurkjans (LAT)	4
Murad Mammadov (AZE)	9
Ivan Lizatović (CRO)	0
Kerem Kamal (TUR)	9
Vitalie Eriomenco (MDA)	0

Semifinals
Karen Aslanyan (ARM)	8
Andrii Semenchuk (UKR)	0
Murad Mammadov (AZE)	4
Kerem Kamal (TUR)	5

Final
Karen Aslanyan (ARM)	2
Kerem Kamal (TUR)	7

=== Repechage ===
Repechage round 1
Tino Ojala (FIN)	0
Vitalie Eriomenco (MDA)	6

Bronze medal match
Mairbek Salimov (POL)	10
Andrii Semenchuk (UKR)	0
Vitalie Eriomenco (MDA)	2^{F}
Murad Mammadov (AZE)	3

== Final standing ==
Rank	Athlete
1st place, gold medalist(s)	Kerem Kamal (TUR)
2nd place, silver medalist(s)	Karen Aslanyan (ARM)
3rd place, bronze medalist(s)	Mairbek Salimov (POL)
3rd place, bronze medalist(s)	Vitalie Eriomenco (MDA)
5	Andrii Semenchuk (UKR)
5	Murad Mammadov (AZE)
7	Aleksandrs Jurkjans (LAT)
8	Ivan Lizatović (CRO)
9	Etienne Kinsinger (GER)
10	Beka Guruli (GEO)
11	Hleb Makaranka (UWW)
12	Léo Tudezca (FRA)
13	Dinislam Bammatov (UWW)
14	Tino Ojala (FIN)
