= Alejandro Sancho =

American Greco-Roman wrestler (born 1994)

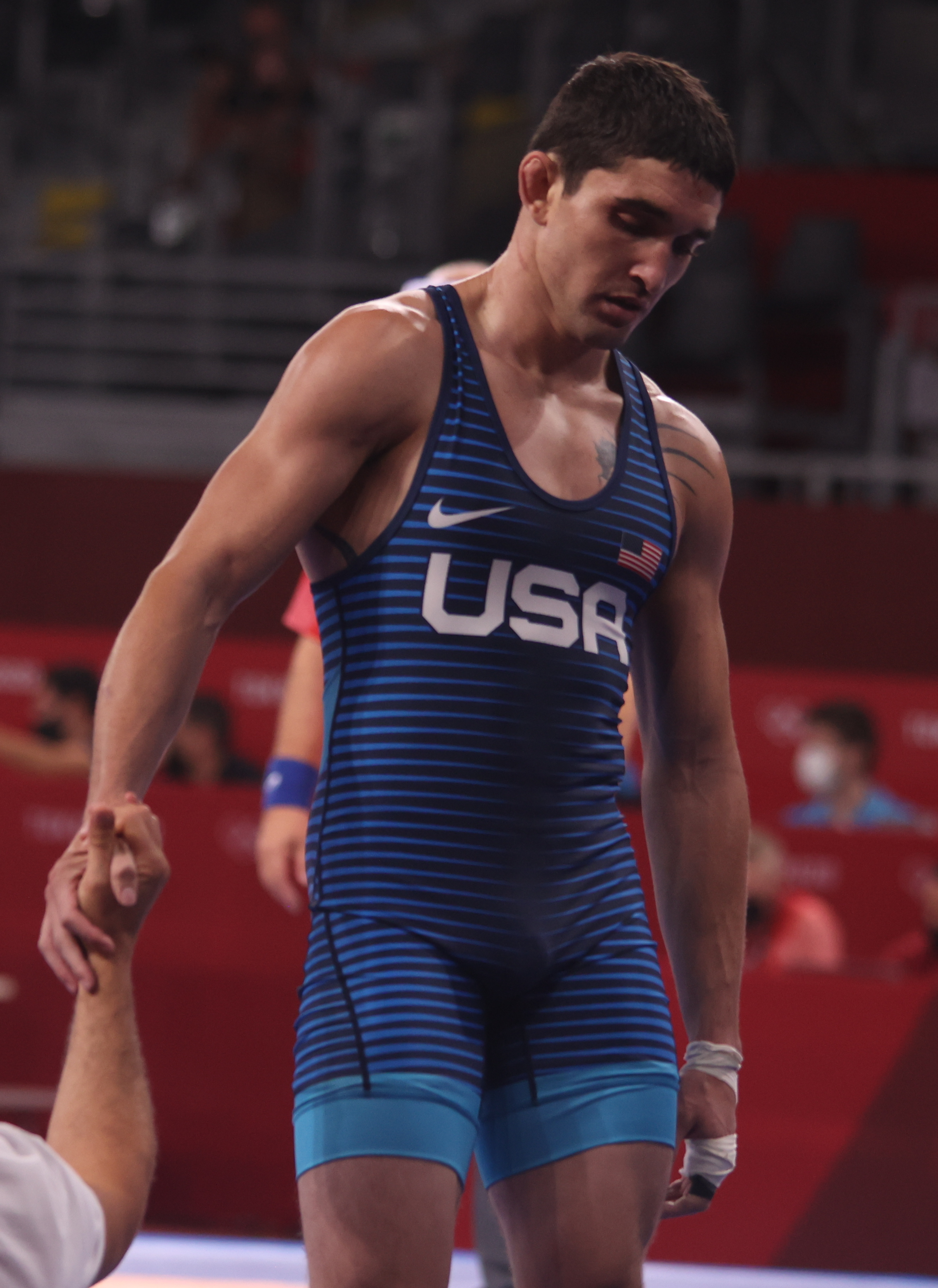
- Sancho at the 2020 Summer Olympic Games

Personal information
- Born: March 18, 1994 (age 32) Miami, Florida, U.S.
- Height: 5 ft 8 in (173 cm)

Sport
- Country: United States
- Sport: Wrestling
- Weight class: 67 kg (148 lb)
- Event: Greco-Roman
- Club: U.S. Army WCAP
Medal record
Men's Greco Roman wrestling
Representing United States
Pan American Championships
Gold medal – first place	2024 Acapulco	67 kg
Gold medal – first place	2025 Monterrey	72 kg
Silver medal – second place	2016 Frisco	66 kg
Bronze medal – third place	2020 Ottawa	67 kg
World Military Championships
Bronze medal – third place	2023 Baku	67 kg

Alejandro Sancho (born March 18, 1994) is an American Greco-Roman wrestler.

== High school ==
Sancho first started wrestling at South Miami High School in South Miami, Florida.

== Greco-Roman wrestling career ==
Sancho defeated 2012 Olympian Ellis Coleman in the U.S. Olympic Trials to qualify for the 2020 Summer Olympics at 67 kg. He entered the Trials as the reigning World Team member, earning qualification for the weight at the 2020 Pan American Wrestling Olympic Qualification Tournament.

At the 2023 Pritchard Companies U.S. Open, Sancho was pinned by high-school athlete and U17 world champion Joel Adams.

Sancho won the gold medal in his event at the 2024 Pan American Wrestling Championships held in Acapulco, Mexico. He defeated Andrés Montaño of Ecuador in his gold medal match. A few days later, he competed at the 2024 Pan American Wrestling Olympic Qualification Tournament held in Acapulco, Mexico hoping to qualify for the 2024 Summer Olympics in Paris, France. He was eliminated in his second match.

Sancho is part of the U.S. Army World Class Athlete Program, holding a rank of Specialist.
