= Artem Surkov =

Russian Greco-Roman wrestler

Artem Surkov Артём Сурков
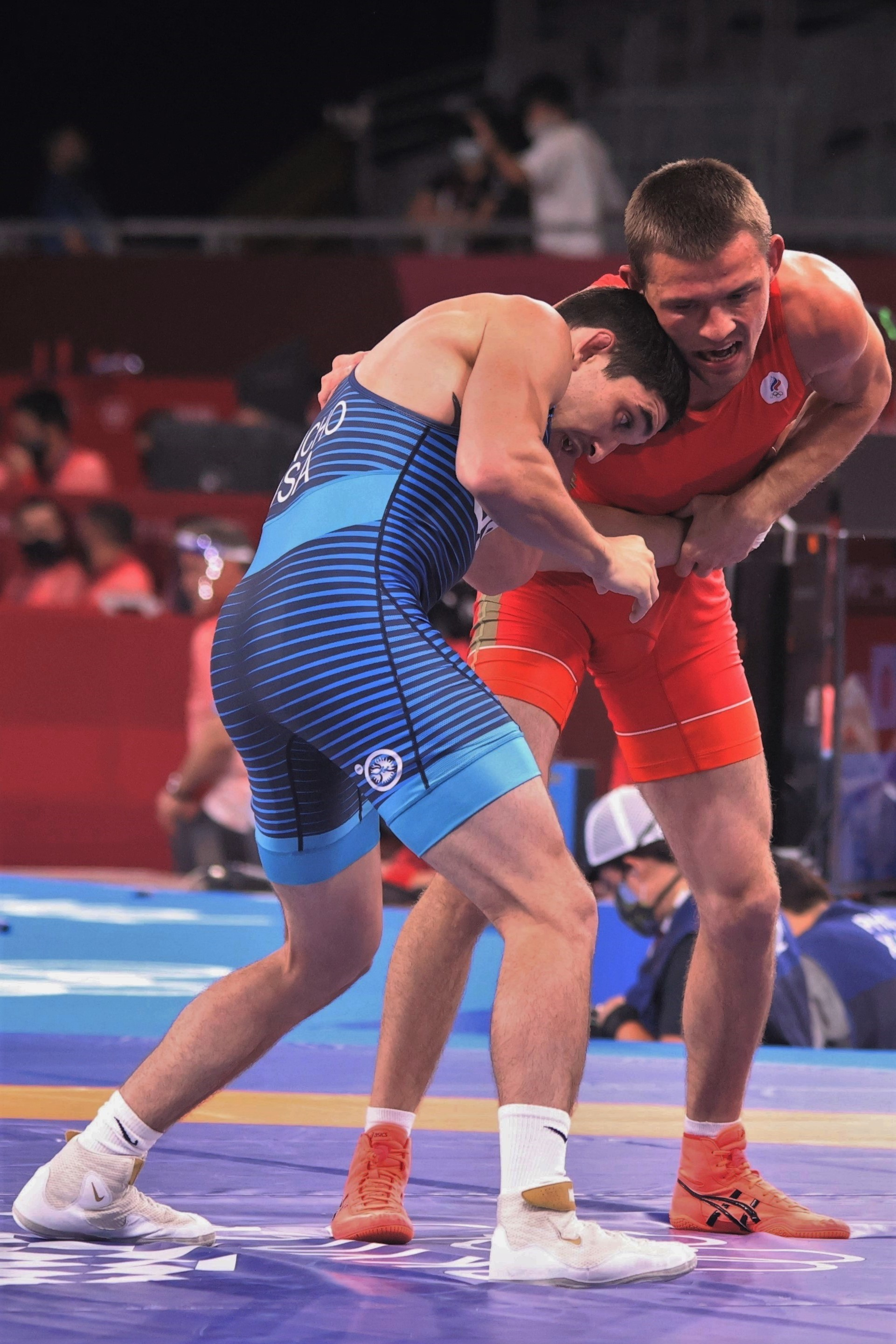
- Artem Surkov (in red) vs. Alejandro Sancho at the 2020 Summer Olympics

Personal information
- Full name: Artem Olegovich Surkov
- National team: Russia
- Born: 15 October 1993 (age 32) Saransk, Republic of Mordovia, Russia
- Height: 1.77 m (5 ft 10 in)
- Weight: 66 kg (146 lb)

Sport
- Country: Russia
- Sport: Wrestling
- Event: Greco-Roman
- Club: Russian Air Force Sport Club; Aleksey Mishin Wrestling Academy
- Coached by: Viktor Ermoshin, Sergey Egorkin and Vasily Ermakov
Medal record
Men's Greco-Roman wrestling
Representing Russia
World Championships
Gold medal – first place	2018 Budapest	67 kg
Silver medal – second place	2019 Nur-Sultan	67 kg
Bronze medal – third place	2015 Las Vegas	66 kg
Bronze medal – third place	2017 Paris	66 kg
European Championships
Gold medal – first place	2017 Novi Sad	66 kg
Gold medal – first place	2018 Kaspiysk	67 kg
Bronze medal – third place	2019 Bucharest	67 kg
World Cup
Gold medal – first place	2017 Abadan	66 kg
Silver medal – second place	2015 Tehran	66 kg
European Games
Gold medal – first place	2015 Baku	66 kg
Military World Games
Silver medal – second place	2019 Wuhan	67 kg
Ivan Poddubny Memorial
Gold medal – first place	2018 Krasnodar	67 kg
Golden Grand Prix Ivan Poddubny
Silver medal – second place	2016 Tyumen	66 kg
Bronze medal – third place	2014 Tyumen	66 kg
Golden Grand Prix Baku
Gold medal – first place	2016 Baku	66 kg
European Nations Cup
Gold medal – first place	2015 Moscow	66 kg
Oleg Karavaev Memorial
Gold medal – first place	2014 Minsk	66 kg
Gold medal – first place	2015 Minsk	66 kg

Artem Olegovich Surkov (Russian: Артём Олегович Сурков; born 15 October 1993) is a Russian Greco-Roman wrestler. Senior World Champion 2018 and runner-up in 2019. He is bronze medalist Golden Grand Prix Ivan Poddubny in the Greco-Roman men's 66 kg event. He competed at the European Games 2015 and in the final match he defeated Migran Arutyunyan of Armenia. Also he won silver medal in World Greco-Roman Cup in Tehran, Islamic Republic of Iran. He was a member of the Russian team in 66 kg at the 2015 World Wrestling Championships in Las Vegas, United States, where he beat Migran Arutyunyan in the bronze medal match.

At the European Wrestling Championships 2018, he won a gold medal. He became world champion at 2018 World Wrestling Championships.

He competed at the 2020 Summer Olympics in Tokyo, Japan and he lost his bronze medal match against Mohamed Ibrahim El-Sayed of Egypt in the 67 kg event.

He is married and has a son.
