= Gevorg Sahakyan =

Polish Greco-Roman wrestler

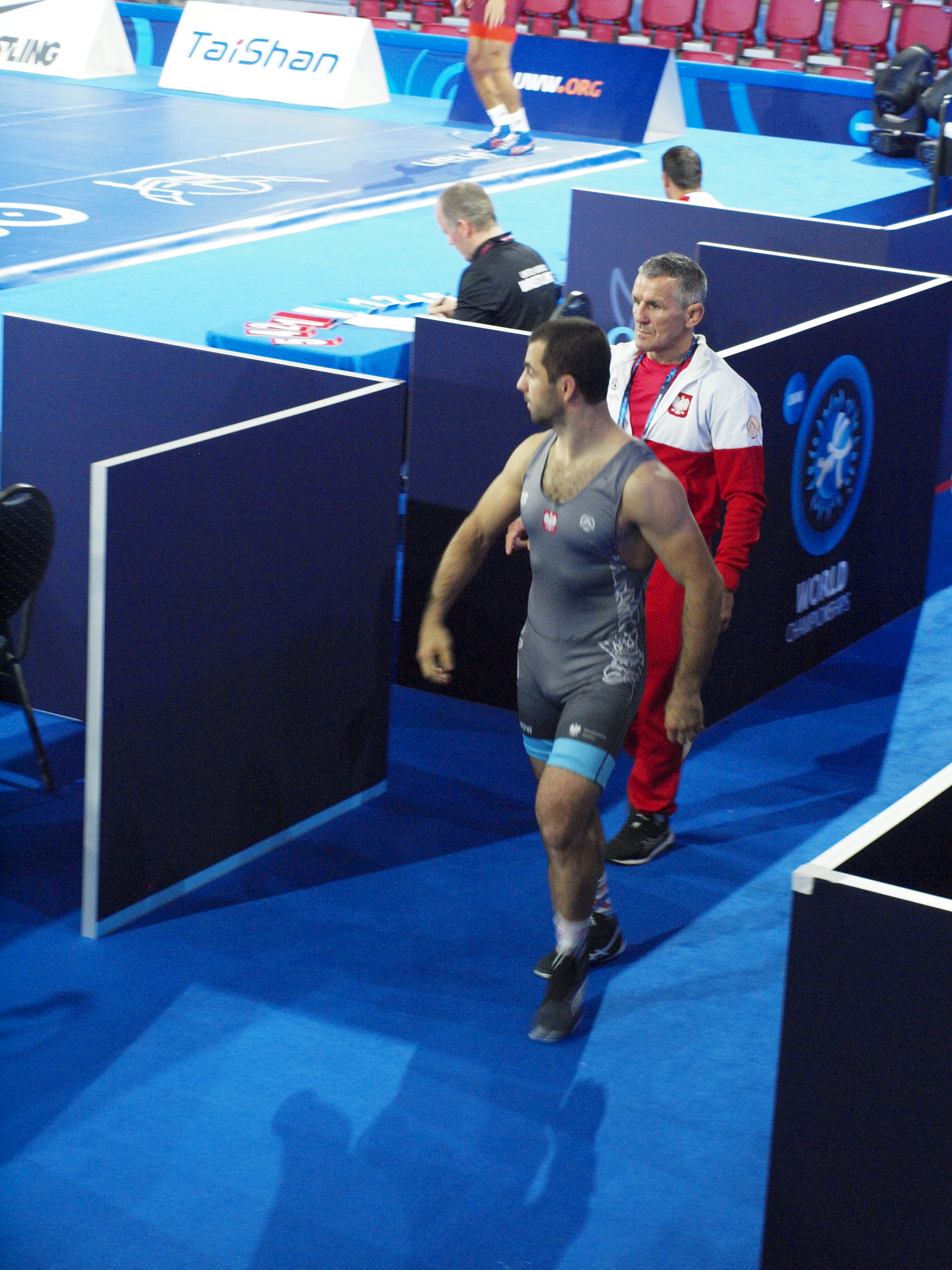
- 2021 World Wrestling Championships

Personal information
- Born: 15 January 1990 (age 36)
- Height: 168 cm (5 ft 6 in)

Sport
- Country: Poland
- Sport: Amateur wrestling
- Weight class: 67 kg
- Event: Greco-Roman
Medal record
Men's Greco-Roman wrestling
Representing Poland
World Championships
Bronze medal – third place	2018 Budapest	67 kg
Bronze medal – third place	2021 Oslo	72 kg
European Championships
Silver medal – second place	2019 Bucharest	67 kg

Gevorg Sahakyan (born 15 January 1990) is a Polish Greco-Roman wrestler of Armenian origin. He is a two-time bronze medalist at the World Wrestling Championships and a silver medalist at the European Wrestling Championships.

== Career ==
In 2018, Sahakyan won one of the bronze medals in the men's Greco-Roman 67 kg event at the World Wrestling Championships held in Budapest, Hungary.

At the 2019 European Wrestling Championships held in Bucharest, Romania, Sahakyan won the silver medal in the 67 kg event. In the final, he lost against Atakan Yüksel of Turkey. In March 2021, he competed at the European Qualification Tournament in Budapest, Hungary hoping to qualify for the 2020 Summer Olympics in Tokyo, Japan. Sahakyan did not qualify at this tournament and he also failed to qualify for the Olympics at the World Olympic Qualification Tournament held in Sofia, Bulgaria.

In January 2021, Sahakyan won the gold medal in the 67 kg event at the Grand Prix Zagreb Open held in Zagreb, Croatia. In June 2021, he won the gold medal in the 72 kg event at the 2021 Wladyslaw Pytlasinski Cup held in Warsaw, Poland.

Sahakyan competed at the 2024 European Wrestling Olympic Qualification Tournament in Baku, Azerbaijan hoping to qualify for the 2024 Summer Olympics in Paris, France. He was eliminated in his fourth match and he did not qualify for the Olympics.

== Achievements ==
Year	Tournament	Location	Result	Event
2018	World Championships	Budapest, Hungary	3rd	Greco-Roman 67 kg
2019	European Championships	Bucharest, Romania	2nd	Greco-Roman 67 kg
2021	World Championships	Oslo, Norway	3rd	Greco-Roman 72 kg
