= Chung Han-jae =

South Korean Greco-Roman wrestler

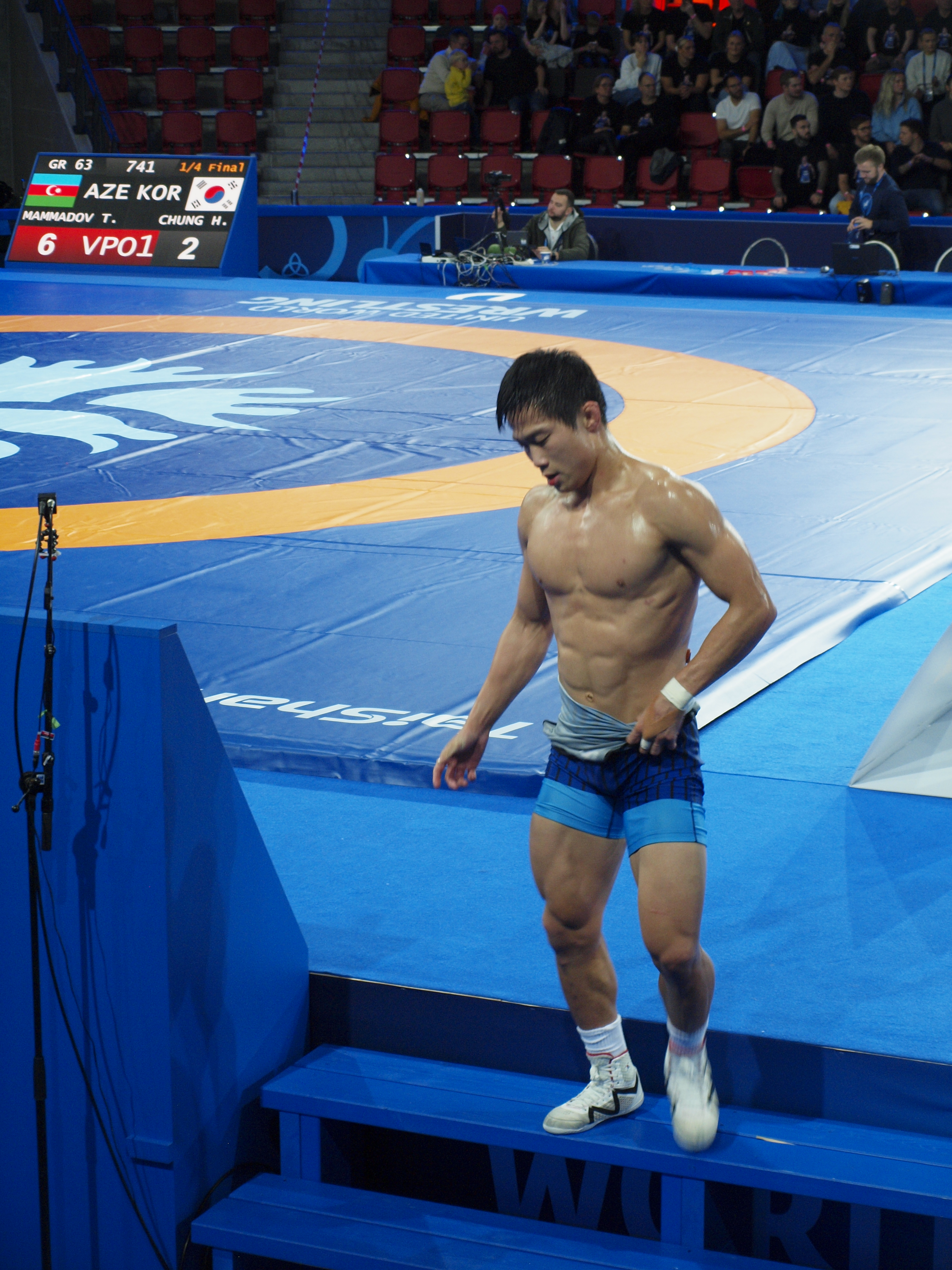

Personal information
- Nationality: South Korea
- Born: September 28, 1995 (age 31) Busan, South Korea
- Height: 1.67 m (5 ft 6 in)

Sport
- Country: South Korea
- Sport: Wrestling
- Weight class: 60–67 kg
- Event: Greco-Roman

Achievements and titles
- World finals: (silver) (2025)
- Regional finals: (bronze) (2023)
Medal record
Men's Greco-Roman wrestling
Representing South Korea
World Championships
Silver medal – second place	2025 Zagreb	63 kg
Asian Games
Bronze medal – third place	2022 Hangzhou	60 kg
Asian Championships
Silver medal – second place	2023 Astana	60 kg
Bronze medal – third place	2021 Almaty	63 kg
Bronze medal – third place	2024 Bishkek	67 kg
Bronze medal – third place	2025 Amman	63 kg
Grand Prix
Silver medal – second place	2025 Ulaanbaatar	63 kg
Bronze medal – third place	2023 Budapest	60 kg

Chung Han-jae (Korean: 정한재, born 28 September 1995) is a South Korean Greco-Roman wrestler. He competed in multiple weight categories between 60 and 67 kg.

== Career ==
He won the bronze medal in the men's Greco-Roman 60 kg event at the 2022 Asian Games held in Hangzhou, China.

Chung claimed the silver medal in the 60 kg category at the 2023 Asian Wrestling Championships in Astana, Kazakhstan. He also won bronze medals at the Asian Wrestling Championships in 2021 (63 kg), 2024 (67 kg), and 2025 (63 kg).

In his youth, he also won a bronze medal at the 2011 Asian Cadet Championships.
