= 2017 World Wrestling Championships =

Wrestling tournament in Paris

- Host city: Paris, France
- Dates: 21–26 August 2017
- Stadium: AccorHotels Arena

Champions
- Freestyle: United States
- Greco-Roman: Russia
- Women: Japan

The 2017 World Wrestling Championships were the 14th edition of World Wrestling Championships of combined events and was held from August 21 to 27 in Paris, France.

== Medal table ==
Rank	Nation	Gold	Silver	Bronze	Total
1	Japan	6	1	2	9
2	United States	3	3	3	9
3	Turkey	3	1	4	8
4	Georgia	2	0	3	5
5	Armenia	2	0	2	4
6	Belarus	1	2	2	5
7	Germany	1	2	1	4
8	Iran	1	0	3	4
9	Azerbaijan	1	0	2	3
10	Mongolia	1	0	1	2
10	South Korea	1	0	1	2
12	Italy	1	0	0	1
12	Serbia	1	0	0	1
14	Russia	0	4	5	9
15	Kazakhstan	0	2	1	3
15	Poland	0	2	1	3
17	Hungary	0	1	2	3
18	Ukraine	0	1	1	2
19	Estonia	0	1	0	1
19	Nigeria	0	1	0	1
19	Romania	0	1	0	1
19	Slovakia	0	1	0	1
19	Tunisia	0	1	0	1
24	Cuba	0	0	3	3
25	Canada	0	0	2	2
26	Chile	0	0	1	1
26	China	0	0	1	1
26	Colombia	0	0	1	1
26	France	0	0	1	1
26	Greece	0	0	1	1
26	Kyrgyzstan	0	0	1	1
26	Latvia	0	0	1	1
26	North Korea	0	0	1	1
26	Sweden	0	0	1	1
Totals (34 entries)		24	24	48	96

== Team ranking ==
Rank	Men's freestyle		Men's Greco-Roman		Women's freestyle	
Rank	Team	Points	Team	Points	Team	Points
1	United States	54	Russia	37	Japan	60
2	Russia	53	Turkey	36	Belarus; United States	38
3	Georgia	40	Iran	36	Belarus; United States	38
4	Turkey	39	Georgia	31	Mongolia	25
5	Azerbaijan	32	Armenia	29	Turkey	24
6	Japan	28	Germany	29	Canada	24
7	Cuba	23	Hungary	29	China	20
8	Kazakhstan	18	Kazakhstan	24	Romania	18
9	Iran	16	South Korea	22	Sweden	18
10	Armenia	16	Azerbaijan	22	Nigeria	17

== Medal summary ==
=== Men's freestyle ===
Event	Gold	Silver	Bronze
57 kg	Yuki Takahashi; Japan	Thomas Gilman; United States	Andriy Yatsenko; Ukraine
57 kg	Yuki Takahashi; Japan	Thomas Gilman; United States	Erdenebatyn Bekhbayar; Mongolia
61 kg	Haji Aliyev; Azerbaijan	Gadzhimurad Rashidov; Russia	Vladimer Khinchegashvili; Georgia
61 kg	Haji Aliyev; Azerbaijan	Gadzhimurad Rashidov; Russia	Yowlys Bonne; Cuba
65 kg	Zurabi Iakobishvili; Georgia	Magomedmurad Gadzhiev; Poland	Alan Gogaev; Russia
65 kg	Zurabi Iakobishvili; Georgia	Magomedmurad Gadzhiev; Poland	Alejandro Valdés; Cuba
70 kg	Frank Chamizo; Italy	James Green; United States	Yuhi Fujinami; Japan
70 kg	Frank Chamizo; Italy	James Green; United States	Akzhurek Tanatarov; Kazakhstan
74 kg	Jordan Burroughs; United States	Khetag Tsabolov; Russia	Soner Demirtaş; Turkey
74 kg	Jordan Burroughs; United States	Khetag Tsabolov; Russia	Ali Shabanau; Belarus
86 kg	Hassan Yazdani; Iran	Boris Makoev; Slovakia	Vladislav Valiev; Russia
86 kg	Hassan Yazdani; Iran	Boris Makoev; Slovakia	J'den Cox; United States
97 kg	Kyle Snyder; United States	Abdulrashid Sadulaev; Russia	Aslanbek Alborov; Azerbaijan
97 kg	Kyle Snyder; United States	Abdulrashid Sadulaev; Russia	Georgy Ketoev; Armenia
125 kg	Geno Petriashvili; Georgia	Taha Akgül; Turkey	Nick Gwiazdowski; United States
125 kg	Geno Petriashvili; Georgia	Taha Akgül; Turkey	Levan Berianidze; Armenia

=== Men's Greco-Roman ===
Event	Gold	Silver	Bronze
59 kg	Kenichiro Fumita; Japan	Meirambek Ainagulov; Kazakhstan	Stepan Maryanyan; Russia
59 kg	Kenichiro Fumita; Japan	Meirambek Ainagulov; Kazakhstan	Kim Seung-hak; South Korea
66 kg	Ryu Han-su; South Korea	Mateusz Bernatek; Poland	Artem Surkov; Russia
66 kg	Ryu Han-su; South Korea	Mateusz Bernatek; Poland	Atakan Yüksel; Turkey
71 kg	Frank Stäbler; Germany	Demeu Zhadrayev; Kazakhstan	Bálint Korpási; Hungary
71 kg	Frank Stäbler; Germany	Demeu Zhadrayev; Kazakhstan	Mohammad Ali Geraei; Iran
75 kg	Viktor Nemeš; Serbia	Tamás Lőrincz; Hungary	Fatih Cengiz; Turkey
75 kg	Viktor Nemeš; Serbia	Tamás Lőrincz; Hungary	Saeid Abdevali; Iran
80 kg	Maksim Manukyan; Armenia	Radzik Kuliyeu; Belarus	Pascal Eisele; Germany
80 kg	Maksim Manukyan; Armenia	Radzik Kuliyeu; Belarus	Elvin Mursaliyev; Azerbaijan
85 kg	Metehan Başar; Turkey	Denis Kudla; Germany	Hossein Nouri; Iran
85 kg	Metehan Başar; Turkey	Denis Kudla; Germany	Roberti Kobliashvili; Georgia
98 kg	Artur Aleksanyan; Armenia	Musa Evloev; Russia	Revaz Nadareishvili; Georgia
98 kg	Artur Aleksanyan; Armenia	Musa Evloev; Russia	Balázs Kiss; Hungary
130 kg	Rıza Kayaalp; Turkey	Heiki Nabi; Estonia	Óscar Pino; Cuba
130 kg	Rıza Kayaalp; Turkey	Heiki Nabi; Estonia	Yasmani Acosta; Chile

=== Women's freestyle ===
Event	Gold	Silver	Bronze
48 kg	Yui Susaki; Japan	Alina Vuc; Romania	Kim Son-hyang; North Korea
48 kg	Yui Susaki; Japan	Alina Vuc; Romania	Evin Demirhan; Turkey
53 kg	Vanesa Kaladzinskaya; Belarus	Mayu Mukaida; Japan	Maria Prevolaraki; Greece
53 kg	Vanesa Kaladzinskaya; Belarus	Mayu Mukaida; Japan	Roksana Zasina; Poland
55 kg	Haruna Okuno; Japan	Odunayo Adekuoroye; Nigeria	Becka Leathers; United States
55 kg	Haruna Okuno; Japan	Odunayo Adekuoroye; Nigeria	Iryna Kurachkina; Belarus
58 kg	Helen Maroulis; United States	Marwa Amri; Tunisia	Michelle Fazzari; Canada
58 kg	Helen Maroulis; United States	Marwa Amri; Tunisia	Aisuluu Tynybekova; Kyrgyzstan
60 kg	Risako Kawai; Japan	Alli Ragan; United States	Anastasija Grigorjeva; Latvia
60 kg	Risako Kawai; Japan	Alli Ragan; United States	Johanna Mattsson; Sweden
63 kg	Pürevdorjiin Orkhon; Mongolia	Yuliya Tkach; Ukraine	Valeria Lazinskaya; Russia
63 kg	Pürevdorjiin Orkhon; Mongolia	Yuliya Tkach; Ukraine	Jackeline Rentería; Colombia
69 kg	Sara Dosho; Japan	Aline Focken; Germany	Koumba Larroque; France
69 kg	Sara Dosho; Japan	Aline Focken; Germany	Han Yue; China
75 kg	Yasemin Adar; Turkey	Vasilisa Marzaliuk; Belarus	Hiroe Suzuki; Japan
75 kg	Yasemin Adar; Turkey	Vasilisa Marzaliuk; Belarus	Justina Di Stasio; Canada

== Participating nations ==
684 competitors from 73 nations participated.

- Albania (1)
- Algeria (3)
- Argentina (2)
- Armenia (12)
- Australia (6)
- Austria (6)
- Azerbaijan (22)
- Bahrain (1)
- Belarus (22)
- Brazil (7)
- Bulgaria (19)
- Canada (16)
- Chile (2)
- China (22)
- Chinese Taipei (3)
- Colombia (9)
- Congo DR (1)
- Croatia (4)
- Cuba (10)
- Czech Republic (7)
- Denmark (3)
- Dominican Republic (8)
- Egypt (8)
- Estonia (5)
- Finland (5)
- France (23)
- Georgia (16)
- Germany (20)
- Greece (7)
- Guam (1)
- Honduras (2)
- Hungary (16)
- India (24)
- Iran (16)
- Israel (5)
- Italy (5)
- Japan (24)
- Kazakhstan (23)
- Kyrgyzstan (19)
- Latvia (3)
- Lithuania (9)
- Macedonia (3)
- Moldova (13)
- Mongolia (16)
- Morocco (5)
- Nauru (1)
- Netherlands (1)
- New Zealand (3)
- Nigeria (6)
- North Korea (6)
- Norway (5)
- Palau (2)
- Palestine (1)
- Peru (8)
- Poland (18)
- Puerto Rico (3)
- Qatar (1)
- Romania (10)
- Russia (24)
- Serbia (5)
- Slovakia (5)
- Slovenia (1)
- South Korea (24)
- Spain (5)
- Sweden (9)
- Switzerland (2)
- Tajikistan (1)
- Tunisia (2)
- Turkey (23)
- Ukraine (24)
- United States (24)
- Uzbekistan (11)
- Vietnam (5)
