= Yerzhet Zharlykassyn =

Kazakhstani Greco-Roman wrestler

Personal information
- Born: 26 August 2000 (age 26) Kazakhstan
- Height: 1.65 m (5 ft 5 in)
- Weight: 63 kg (139 lb; 9.9 st)

Sport
- Country: Kazakhstan
- Sport: Amateur wrestling
- Event: Greco-Roman
- Coached by: Besolt Deziev
Medal record
Men's Greco-Roman wrestling
Representing Kazakhstan
World Championships
Silver medal – second place	2024 Tirana	63 kg
Asian Championships
Gold medal – first place	2024 Bishkek	63 kg
Grand Prix
Bronze medal – third place	2025 Budapest	63 kg
Asian Juniors Championships
Bronze medal – third place	2022 Bishkek	63 kg

Yerzhet Zharlykassyn (born 26 August 2000) is a Kazakh Greco-Roman wrestler competing in the 63 kg division. He won the silver medal at the 2024 World Wrestling Championships.

== Career ==
In 2024, Yerzhet Zharlykassyn competed in the Greco-Roman 63 kg event at the 2024 Asian Wrestling Championships held in Bishkek, Kyrgyzstan and won the gold medal.

Zharlykassyn won the silver medal at the 2024 World Wrestling Championships in Tirana, Albania, losing 6–1 to Azerbaijan's Nihat Mammadli in the final match of the men's 63 kg Greco-Roman 63 kg. Zharlykassyn advanced to the final after defeating Poland's Michał Tracz 9–0 in the second round, France's Stefan Clément 10–0 in the quarterfinals and Individual Independent competing for Russia Sadyk Lalaev 8–0 in the semifinals.
