= Mateusz Bernatek =

Polish Greco-Roman wrestler

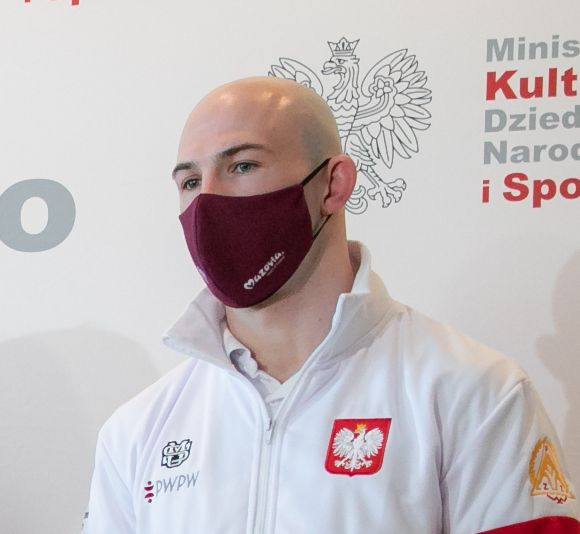

Personal information
- Full name: Mateusz Lucjan Bernatek
- Born: 12 January 1994 (age 32)
- Height: 171 cm (5 ft 7 in)

Sport
- Country: Poland
- Sport: Amateur wrestling
- Weight class: 67 kg
- Event: Greco-Roman
Medal record
Men's Greco-Roman wrestling
Representing Poland
World Championships
Silver medal – second place	2017 Paris	66 kg
European Championships
Silver medal – second place	2021 Warsaw	67 kg
World Military Championships
Bronze medal – third place	2025 Warendorf	77 kg

Mateusz Lucjan Bernatek (born 12 January 1994) is a Polish Greco-Roman wrestler. He won the silver medal in the 66 kg event at the 2017 World Wrestling Championships held in Paris, France. He is also a silver medalist at the 2021 European Wrestling Championships.

== Career ==
In 2015, Bernatek represented Poland at the European Games in the 66 kg event without winning a medal. Four years later, he also competed in the 67 kg event at the 2019 European Games held in Minsk, Belarus.

In 2021, Bernatek won one of the bronze medals in the 72 kg event at the Grand Prix Zagreb Open held in Zagreb, Croatia. In 2022, he won one of the bronze medals in his event at the Vehbi Emre & Hamit Kaplan Tournament held in Istanbul, Turkey. He competed in the 67 kg event at the European Wrestling Championships in Budapest, Hungary.

== Achievements ==
Year	Tournament	Location	Result	Event
2017	World Championships	Paris, France	2nd	Greco-Roman 66 kg
2021	European Championships	Warsaw, Poland	2nd	Greco-Roman 67 kg
