= Meirzhan Shermakhanbet =

Kazakhstani Greco-Roman wrestler

Personal information
- Full name: Meirzhan Anarbayevich Shermakhanbet
- Nationality: Kazakhstan
- Born: Мейіржан Анарбайұлы Шермаханбет; 29 July 1996 (age 30) Karatobe, Kyzylorda Region, Kazakhstan
- Height: 176 cm (5 ft 9 in)

Sport
- Country: Kazakhstan
- Sport: Amateur wrestling
- Weight class: 67 kg
- Event: Greco-Roman
Medal record
Men's Greco-Roman wrestling
Representing Kazakhstan
World Championships
Bronze medal – third place	2018 Budapest	67 kg
Asian Championships
Gold medal – first place	2022 Ulaanbaatar	67 kg
Silver medal – second place	2019 Xi'an	67 kg
Asian Games
Silver medal – second place	2022 Hangzhou	67 kg
Bronze medal – third place	2026 Aichi–Nagoya	67 kg
Vehbi Emre & Hamit Kaplan Tournament
Bronze medal – third place	2022 Istanbul	67 kg
Dan Kolov & Nikola Petrov Tournament
Bronze medal – third place	2019 Russe	67 kg
Grand Prix
Gold medal – first place	2021 Rome	67 kg
Gold medal – first place	2026 Tirana	67 kg
Silver medal – second place	2022 Almaty	72 kg

Meirzhan Shermakhanbet is a Kazakhstani Greco-Roman wrestler. He is a bronze medalist at the World Wrestling Championships and a two-time medalist, including gold, at the Asian Wrestling Championships.

== Career ==
In 2018, Shermakhanbet won one of the bronze medals in the 67 kg event at the World Wrestling Championships held in Budapest, Hungary.

In 2019, Shermakhanbet won the silver medal in the 67 kg event at the Asian Wrestling Championships held in Xi'an, China. In 2021, he won the gold medal in the 67 kg event at the Matteo Pellicone Ranking Series 2021 held in Rome, Italy. A month later, he competed at the Asian Olympic Qualification Tournament hoping to qualify for the 2020 Summer Olympics in Tokyo, Japan.

In 2022, Shermakhanbet won one of the bronze medals in his event at the Vehbi Emre & Hamit Kaplan Tournament held in Istanbul, Turkey. He won the gold medal in his event at the 2022 Asian Wrestling Championships held in Ulaanbaatar, Mongolia.

Shermakhanbet competed at the 2024 Asian Wrestling Olympic Qualification Tournament in Bishkek, Kyrgyzstan hoping to qualify for the 2024 Summer Olympics in Paris, France. He was eliminated in his third match and he did not qualify for the Olympics.

== Achievements ==
Year	Tournament	Location	Result	Event
2018	World Championships	Budapest, Hungary	3rd	Greco-Roman 67 kg
2019	Asian Championships	Xi'an, China	2nd	Greco-Roman 67 kg
2022	Asian Championships	Ulaanbaatar, Mongolia	1st	Greco-Roman 67 kg
2023	Asian Games	Hangzhou, China	2nd	Greco-Roman 67 kg
