= Soslan Daurov =

Belarusian Greco-Roman wrestler

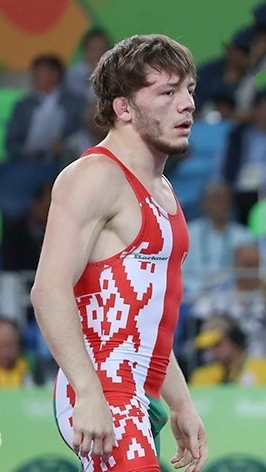
- Daurov at the 2016 Olympics

Personal information
- Born: 15 January 1991 (age 35) Vladikavkaz, Russia
- Education: Hrodna State University
- Height: 164 cm (5 ft 5 in)
- Weight: 59 kg (130 lb)

Sport
- Sport: Greco-Roman wrestling
- Club: Grodno Regional Complex Centre of Olympic Reserve
- Coached by: Vyacheslav Maksimovich
Medal record
Representing Belarus
European Games
| Silver medal – second place | 2015 Baku | -59 kg |
| Bronze medal – third place | 2019 Minsk | -67 kg |
European Championships
| Bronze medal – third place | 2017 Novi Sad | 66 kg |
Individual World Cup
| Bronze medal – third place | 2020 Belgrade | 63 kg |

Soslan Tamazovich Daurov (Russian: Сослан Тамазович Дауров, Belarusian: Саслан Тамазавіч Даураў, born 15 January 1991) is a Russian Greco-Roman wrestler who represents Belarus in the 59 kg and 67 kg category. He won a silver medal at the 2015 European Games, but was eliminated in the first bout at the 2016 Olympics.

Daurov was born in Vladikavkaz, Russia, where he took up wrestling in 2001. In 2011 he moved to Belarus with his family, and in 2012 received Belarusian citizenship. He studies physical education at the Hrodna State University.

In March 2021, he competed at the European Qualification Tournament in Budapest, Hungary hoping to qualify for the 2020 Summer Olympics in Tokyo, Japan.
