= Atakan Yüksel =

Turkish wrestler (born 1985)

Personal information
- Nationality: Turkish
- Born: August 13, 1985 (age 40) Şefaatli, Yozgat Province, Turkey
- Height: 1.72 m (5 ft 8 in) (2012)
- Weight: 66 kg (146 lb) (2012)

Sport
- Sport: Sport wrestling
- Event: Greco-Roman
- Club: ASKİ, Ankara
- Coached by: Mehmet Akif Pirim
Medal record
Men's Greco-Roman wrestling
Representing Turkey
World Championships
Bronze medal – third place	2017 Paris	66 kg
European Championships
Gold medal – first place	2019 Bucharest	67 kg
Mediterranean Games
Gold medal – first place	2013 Mersin	-66 kg

Atakan Yüksel (born August 13, 1985) is a Turkish wrestler competing in the 66 kg division of Greco-Roman style. The 1.72 m (5 ft 8 in) athlete is a member of ASKİ Club in Ankara, where he is coached by Mehmet Akif Pirim.

He qualified for the 2012 Summer Olympics. In March 2021, he competed at the European Qualification Tournament in Budapest, Hungary hoping to qualify for the 2020 Summer Olympics in Tokyo, Japan.

Year	Competition	Venue	Position	Event	Notes
2011	International Vehbi Emre Tournament	Istanbul, Turkey	5th	Greco-Roman	
2012	Golden Grand Prix	Istanbul, Turkey	5th	Greco-Roman	
2013	Mediterranean Games	Mersin, Turkey	1st place, gold medalist(s)	Greco-Roman -66 kg	
