= Karen Aslanyan =

Armenian Greco-Roman wrestler

Personal information
- Born: 22 July 1995 (age 31) Yerevan, Armenia
- Height: 165 cm (5 ft 5 in)

Sport
- Country: Armenia
- Sport: Amateur wrestling
- Event: Greco-Roman
Medal record
Men's Greco-Roman wrestling
Representing Armenia
World Championships
Gold medal – first place	2026 Astana	63 kg
Bronze medal – third place	2024 Tirana	63 kg
European Championships
Silver medal – second place	2025 Bratislava	63 kg
Bronze medal – third place	2018 Kaspiysk	67 kg
Bronze medal – third place	2019 Bucharest	67 kg
Bronze medal – third place	2020 Rome	67 kg
Military World Games
Silver medal – second place	2015 Mungyeong	66 kg

Karen Aslanyan (born 22 July 1995) is an Armenian Greco-Roman wrestler. He won a bronze medal at the European Wrestling Championships in 2018, 2019 and 2020. He also represented Armenia at the 2019 European Games held in Minsk, Belarus where he lost his bronze medal match against Mate Nemeš in the 67 kg event.

Aslanyan competed in the 67 kg event at the 2020 Summer Olympics in Tokyo, Japan.

== Career ==
In 2015, Aslanyan represented Armenia at the Military World Games in Mungyeong, South Korea where he won one of the bronze medals in the 66 kg event.

Aslanyan won one of the bronze medals in the 67 kg event at the 2020 European Wrestling Championships held in Rome, Italy.

== Achievements ==
Year	Tournament	Venue	Result	Event
2015	Military World Games	Mungyeong, South Korea	2nd	Greco-Roman 66 kg
2018	European Championships	Kaspiysk, Russia	3rd	Greco-Roman 67 kg
2019	European Championships	Bucharest, Romania	3rd	Greco-Roman 67 kg
2020	European Championships	Rome, Italy	3rd	Greco-Roman 67 kg
2024	World Championships	Tirana, Albania	3rd	Greco-Roman 63 kg
2025	European Championships	Bratislava, Slovakia	2nd	Greco-Roman 63 kg
