= Ellis Coleman =

American wrestler (born 1991)

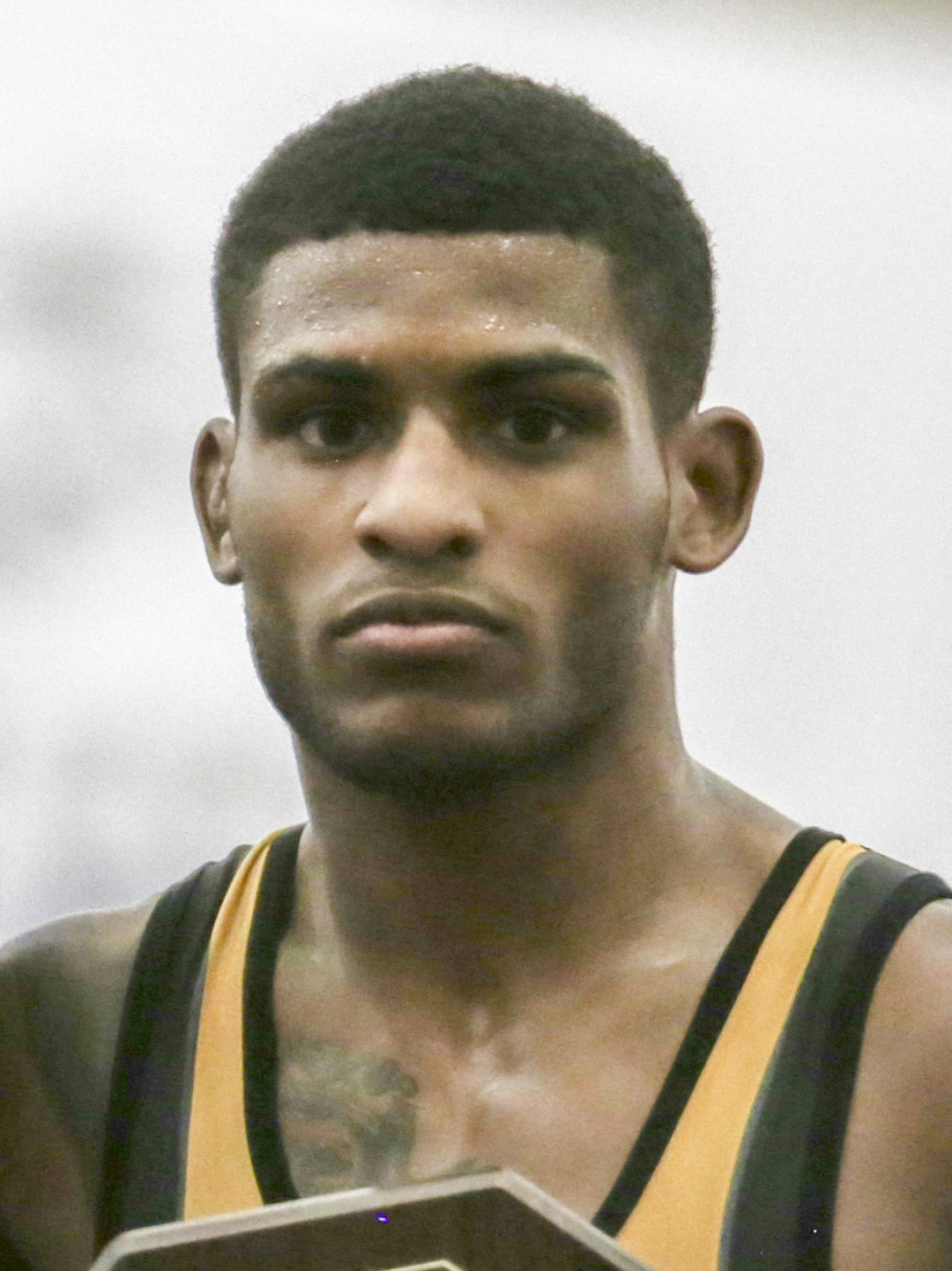
- Coleman in 2018

Personal information
- Born: August 16, 1991 (age 34) Chicago, Illinois, U.S.
- Height: 5 ft 9 in (175 cm)
- Weight: 67 kg (148 lb)

Sport
- Country: United States
- Sport: Wrestling
- Event: Greco-Roman
- Club: U.S. Army WCAP; New York Athletic Club
- Team: USA
Medal record
Men's Greco-Roman wrestling
Representing the United States
Pan American Games
Bronze medal – third place	2019 Lima	67 kg
Pan American Championships
Silver medal – second place	2014 Mexico City	67 kg
Silver medal – second place	2019 Buenos Aires	67 kg
Silver medal – second place	2025 Monterrey	63 kg
Bronze medal – third place	2010 Monterrey	67 kg
Grand Prix
Bronze medal – third place	2025 Zagreb	63 kg
US Open Championships
Gold medal – first place	2013 Las Vegas (OW)	67 kg
Gold medal – first place	2016 Las Vegas	67 kg
Gold medal – first place	2017 Las Vegas	67 kg
Gold medal – first place	2018 Las Vegas	67 kg
Gold medal – first place	2019 Las Vegas	67 kg
Silver medal – second place	2014 Las Vegas	67 kg
Junior World Championships
Bronze medal – third place	2010 Budapest	66 kg
Bronze medal – third place	2011 Bucharest	66 kg

Ellis Coleman (born August 16, 1991) is an American wrestler from Chicago who won the 2012 U.S. Olympic Trials to compete for the United States team in the Greco-Roman 60 kg competition of Wrestling at the 2012 Summer Olympics at the 2012 Olympics. Coleman overcame challenging life conditions after being enrolled in youth wrestling classes. As a high school senior for Oak Park and River Forest High School finished third in the state wrestling championships. On several occasions, Coleman executed a takedown by jumping over his opponent and grabbing him as he flew over his back. Coleman is sometimes referred to as the Flying Squirrel for this takedown move that he has made famous.

== Background ==
Coleman was raised by his single mother, Yolanda Barral, in Chicago, Illinois. Coleman describes his biological father, Lewellis Coleman, as a person who was "in and out of jail [his] whole life." Apart from visiting him in jail, the only memory he has of his father is the time his father sold all the family's televisions and the PlayStation for drugs. Federal records describe his biological father as a "career offender" with 19 aliases.

His mother raised the family, including Coleman's brother (Lillashawn) and sister, in the Humboldt Park community area, then the West Side and finally the suburb Oak Park. Coleman describes his stepfather as a long-time gang member with an extensive criminal record. After enduring formative years with gunfights outside elementary school, home loss due to an apartment fire, and expulsion hearings, his stepfather, Mose Oliver, introduced him to wrestling to keep him out of trouble. Federal records confirm that Oliver is an alleged 1990's gang enforcer who served time from 2004 to 2011 for participation in Operation Day Trader. The wrestling started in about 2001. By sixth grade both his father and stepfather were incarcerated and his father figure was his wrestling coach, Mike Powell. Coleman attended Ella Flagg Young elementary school. Barral raised her family with little assistance away from the gang influences of the West Side. She applied for section 8 assistance. Coleman, who was nearly expelled as a sophomore, graduated from Oak Park and River Forest High School in Oak Park, Illinois in 2009. He studied at Northern Michigan University.

== Wrestling career ==
As a high school senior at the 2009 Illinois High School Association Class 3A tournament, Coleman endured his only loss of the season to Maxamillian Schneider of Lane Technical College Prep High School to finish third and end the season with a 49–1 record. Following the loss, his heart rate reached 225, necessitating treatment by paramedics.

In 2011, a video of Coleman was posted to YouTube. Subsequently, Coleman gained a cult-following for the recording of him performing a move at the 2011 Junior World Championships that he calls "The Flying Squirrel", which involves somersaulting over his opponent just before his takedown. He has performed the move at the 2009 Sunkist Open against Joe Betterman. He also performed the move against Iran's Mehdi Zidvand in the quarter finals at the 2011 Junior World Championships. Coleman claims he has used the "Flying Squirrel" move over a dozen times in competition. His successful attempt of the move at the 2011 Junior World Championships made the number 1 on SportsCenters Top 10 Plays and was ranked third on the ESPN 2011 Best of the Best Highlights. He appeared on ESPN's morning shows, such as ESPN First Take. The move made him so famous that he received lucrative offers to begin a professional wrestling career, but he declined in favor of continuing his Olympic dream. Coleman credits his brother for the move. Ellis is a five-time Greco-Roman US Open champion in (2013, 2016–2019) winning the Outstanding Wrestler Award in 2013.

Ellis defeated Betterman 2 to 0 at the finals of the 2012 U.S. Olympic Trials. Coleman had attended Betterman's wrestling clinics when he was younger. Coleman was the youngest member of the American wrestling delegation at the 2012 Olympics. After Coleman qualified for the Olympics, he realized that his mother, who works in customer service for the Illinois State Toll Highway Authority, could not afford to attend due to financial hardship. Coleman was living at the United States Olympic Training Center in Colorado Springs on a limited monthly stipend from the United States Olympic Committee and could not assist her. Mike Powell, Coleman's coach at Oak Park, rented Coleman's family a one-bedroom flat in London out of personal funds and the Oak Park High School wrestling program subsequently raised $14,000 to ensure that his mother, aunt and siblings could attend. Coleman dropped from the 66 kg division to the 60 kg division for the Olympics. Coleman lost in the first round of Olympic competition to Ivo Angelov of Bulgaria by a 3–1 score.

2012 Olympic American gymnast Gabby Douglas also became known for the nickname "Flying Squirrel". In an attempt to solidify his nickname while training in Colorado Springs, Coleman purchased a pet flying squirrel that he keeps in a cage and feeds apples. His Twitter handle is @daFlyinSquirrel.
