= Ryu Han-su =

South Korean wrestler (born 1988)

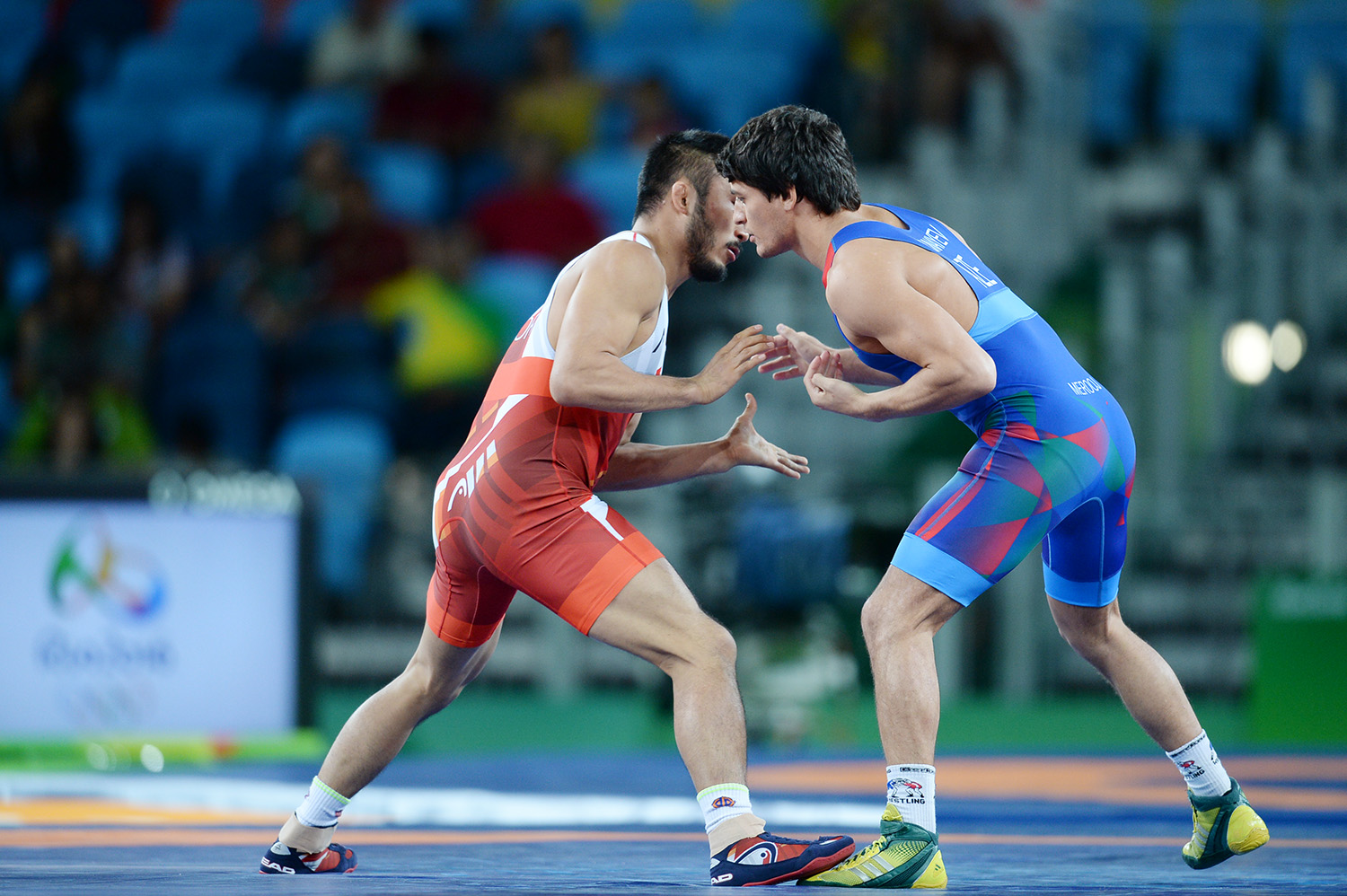
- Ryu Han-su (in red) against Rasul Chunayev from Azerbaijan. Olympics 2016

Personal information
- Nationality: South Korea
- Born: February 1, 1988 (age 38) Daegu, South Korea
- Education: Kyungsung University
- Height: 170 cm (5 ft 7 in)

Korean name
- Hangul: 류한수
- RR: Ryu Hansu
- MR: Ryu Hansu

Sport
- Country: South Korea
- Sport: Wrestling
- Weight class: 66-72 kg
- Event: Greco-Roman

Achievements and titles
- Olympic finals: 5th (2016)
Medal record
Men's Greco-Roman wrestling
Representing South Korea
World Championships
Gold medal – first place	2013 Budapest	66 kg
Gold medal – first place	2017 Paris	66 kg
Silver medal – second place	2015 Las Vegas	66 kg
Asian Games
Gold medal – first place	2014 Incheon	66 kg
Gold medal – first place	2018 Jakarta	67 kg
Asian Championships
Gold medal – first place	2015 Doha	66 kg
Gold medal – first place	2019 Xi'an	67 kg
Gold medal – first place	2020 New Delhi	67 kg
Gold medal – first place	2021 Almaty	72 kg
Silver medal – second place	2022 Ulaanbaatar	67 kg
Bronze medal – third place	2014 Astana	66 kg

Ryu Han-Su (born February 1, 1988) is a South Korean Greco-Roman wrestler who competes in the 66 kg division. He entered Kyungsung University's Department of Sports and Health in 2006. He reached the final of the 2013 World Wrestling Championships in the same division and also won the gold medal.

He competed at the 2024 Asian Wrestling Olympic Qualification Tournament in Bishkek, Kyrgyzstan hoping to qualify for the 2024 Summer Olympics in Paris, France. He was eliminated in his first match and he did not qualify for the Olympics.
