= Fredrik Bjerrehuus =

Danish Greco-Roman wrestler

Personal information
- Full name: Fredrik Holmquist Bjerrehuus
- Nationality: Danish
- Born: 14 January 1990 (age 36) Herning, Denmark

Sport
- Country: Denmark
- Sport: Wrestling
- Event: Greco-Roman
Medal record
Men's Greco-Roman wrestling
Representing Denmark
Nordic Championships
Gold medal – first place	Poniewież 2017	71 kg
Gold medal – first place	Tallinn 2016	66 kg
Silver medal – second place	Bodø 2015	71 kg
Silver medal – second place	Aarhus 2012	66 kg
Bronze medal – third place	Turku 2014	66 kg

Fredrik Holmquist Bjerrehuus (born 14 January 1990) is a Danish Greco-Roman wrestler. He finished in fifth place at the 2019 World Wrestling Championships, thus qualifying for the 2020 Summer Olympics. He also finished fifth at the 2018 European Wrestling Championships, ninth at the 2015 European Games, and won five medals at the Nordic Wrestling Championships between 2012 and 2017.
