= 2020 European Wrestling Championships – Men's Greco-Roman 67 kg =

Wrestling competition

The men's Greco-Roman 67 kg is a competition featured at the 2020 European Wrestling Championships, and was held in Rome, Italy on February 11 and February 12.

== Medalists ==
Gold	Morten Thoresen; Norway
Silver	Nazir Abdullaev; Russia
Bronze	Kristupas Šleiva; Lithuania
Bronze	Karen Aslanyan; Armenia

== Results ==
Legend

- F — Won by fall

=== Final ===
Final
Morten Thoresen (NOR)	2
Nazir Abdullaev (RUS)	2

=== Top half ===
Round of 32

Round of 16
Enes Başar (TUR)	10
Ott Saar (EST)	1
Kristupas Šleiva (LTU)	3
Morten Thoresen (NOR)	4
Aliaksandr Liavonchyk (BLR)	2
Elmer Mattila (FIN)	1
Andreas Vetsch (SUI)	1
Aleksandrs Jurkjans (LAT)	5

Quarterfinals
Enes Başar (TUR)	0
Morten Thoresen (NOR)	2
Aliaksandr Liavonchyk (BLR)	8
Aleksandrs Jurkjans (LAT)	0

Semifinals
Morten Thoresen (NOR)	2
Aliaksandr Liavonchyk (BLR)	1

=== Bottom half ===
Round of 32
István Váncza (HUN)	8
Islambek Dadov (AZE)	7
Roman Pacurkowski (POL)	9
Aker Al-Obaidi (UWW)	0
Nazir Abdullaev (RUS)	4
Deyvid Dimitrov (BUL)	2
Donior Islamov (MDA)	2
Danijel Janečić (CRO)	1
Mate Nemeš (SRB)	3
Yasin Özay (FRA)	1
Denys Demyankov (UKR)	2
Ignazio Sanfilippo (ITA)	1
Witalis Lazovski (GER)	2
Giorgi Shotadze (GEO)	3
Simon Erlandsson (SWE)	1
Karen Aslanyan (ARM)	3

Round of 16
István Váncza (HUN)	6
Roman Pacurkowski (POL)	0
Nazir Abdullaev (RUS)	4
Donior Islamov (MDA)	0
Mate Nemeš (SRB)	2
Denys Demyankov (UKR)	0
Giorgi Shotadze (GEO)	0
Karen Aslanyan (ARM)	9

Quarterfinals
István Váncza (HUN)	0
Nazir Abdullaev (RUS)	4
Mate Nemeš (SRB)	1
Karen Aslanyan (ARM)	10

Semifinals
Nazir Abdullaev (RUS)	4
Karen Aslanyan (ARM)	3

=== Repechage ===
Repechage round 1
Deyvid Dimitrov (BUL)	7
Donior Islamov (MDA)	1

Repechage round 2
Kristupas Šleiva (LTU)	10
Enes Başar (TUR)	0
Deyvid Dimitrov (BUL)	0
István Váncza (HUN)	10

Bronze medal match
Kristupas Šleiva (LTU)	4
Aliaksandr Liavonchyk (BLR)	2
István Váncza (HUN)	5
Karen Aslanyan (ARM)	7

== Final standing ==
Rank	Athlete
1st place, gold medalist(s)	Morten Thoresen (NOR)
2nd place, silver medalist(s)	Nazir Abdullaev (RUS)
3rd place, bronze medalist(s)	Kristupas Šleiva (LTU)
3rd place, bronze medalist(s)	Karen Aslanyan (ARM)
5	István Váncza (HUN)
5	Aliaksandr Liavonchyk (BLR)
7	Mate Nemeš (SRB)
8	Enes Başar (TUR)
9	Roman Pacurkowski (POL)
10	Deyvid Dimitrov (BUL)
11	Donior Islamov (MDA)
12	Aleksandrs Jurkjans (LAT)
13	Giorgi Shotadze (GEO)
14	Denys Demyankov (UKR)
15	Islambek Dadov (AZE)
16	Witalis Lazovski (GER)
17	Elmer Mattila (FIN)
18	Danijel Janečić (CRO)
19	Ignazio Sanfilippo (ITA)
20	Yasin Özay (FRA)
21	Simon Erlandsson (SWE)
22	Andreas Vetsch (SUI)
23	Ott Saar (EST)
24	Aker Al-Obaidi (UWW)
