= 2024 U23 World Wrestling Championships – Men's freestyle 61 kg =

Wrestling competitions

Men's freestyle 61 kg at the 2024 U23 World Championships
- Venue: Tirana Olympic Park
- Dates: 25–26 October
- Competitors: 20 from 18 nations

Medalists
gold medal	Bashir Magomedov	Authorised Neutral Athletes
silver medal	Ruslan Abdullayev	Azerbaijan
bronze medal	Ebrahim Khari	Iran
bronze medal	Abhishek Dhaka	India

The men's freestyle 61 kilograms is a competition featured at the 2024 U23 World Wrestling Championships, and will be held in Tirana, Albania on 25 and 26 October 2024.

This freestyle wrestling competition consists of a single-elimination tournament, with a repechage used to determine the winner of two bronze medals. The two finalists face off for gold and silver medals. Each wrestler who loses to one of the two finalists moves into the repechage, culminating in a pair of bronze medal matches featuring the semifinal losers each facing the remaining repechage opponent from their half of the bracket.

== Results ==
Legend

- F — Won by fall

=== Final ===
Final
Bashir Magomedov (AIN)	4
Ruslan Abdullayev (AZE)	0

=== Top half ===
Round of 32
Simone Piroddu (ITA)	0
Ebrahim Khari (IRI)	10
Nic Bouzakis (USA)	3
Levik Mikayelyan (ARM)	10

Round of 16
Elkin España (COL)	8^{F}
Tai Lok Ming (HKG)	0
Ebrahim Khari (IRI)	12
Adilet Almukhamedov (KAZ)	1
Emre Kural (TUR)	1
Levik Mikayelyan (ARM)	7
Bashir Magomedov (AIN)	3
Bai Jilian (CHN)	2

Quarterfinals
Elkin España (COL)	0
Ebrahim Khari (IRI)	10
Levik Mikayelyan (ARM)	0
Bashir Magomedov (AIN)	11

Semifinals
Ebrahim Khari (IRI)	2
Bashir Magomedov (AIN)	12

=== Bottom half ===
Round of 32
Endrio Avdyli (ALB)	0
Ruslan Abdullayev (AZE)	11
Iukhan Dokturbek Uulu (KGZ)	8
Vasile Marcu (MDA)	2

Round of 16
William Betancourt (PUR)	1
Mykyta Abramov (UKR)	7
Ruslan Abdullayev (AZE)	6^{F}
Fotis Papadopoulos (CAN)	0
Abhishek Dhaka (IND)	6
Iukhan Dokturbek Uulu (KGZ)	1
Meiryu Akamine (JPN)	6
Omar Gazashvili (GEO)	1

Quarterfinals
Mykyta Abramov (UKR)	1
Ruslan Abdullayev (AZE)	3
Abhishek Dhaka (IND)	4
Meiryu Akamine (JPN)	2

Semifinals
Ruslan Abdullayev (AZE)	11
Abhishek Dhaka (IND)	1

=== Repechage ===
Repechage round 1
Endrio Avdyli (ALB)	17
Fotis Papadopoulos (CAN)	8

Repechage round 2
Bai Jilian (CHN)	1
Levik Mikayelyan (ARM)	2
Endrio Avdyli (ALB)	3
Mykyta Abramov (UKR)	14

Bronze medals
Levik Mikayelyan (ARM)	3
Ebrahim Khari (IRI)	4
Mykyta Abramov (UKR)	1
Abhishek Dhaka (IND)	3

== Final standing ==
Rank	Athlete
1st place, gold medalist(s)	Bashir Magomedov (AIN)
2nd place, silver medalist(s)	Ruslan Abdullayev (AZE)
3rd place, bronze medalist(s)	Ebrahim Khari (IRI)
3rd place, bronze medalist(s)	Abhishek Dhaka (IND)
5	Levik Mikayelyan (ARM)
5	Mykyta Abramov (UKR)
7	Elkin España (COL)
8	Endrio Avdyli (ALB)
9	Iukhan Dokturbek Uulu (KGZ)
10	Meiryu Akamine (JPN)
11	Bai Jilian (CHN)
12	Fotis Papadopoulos (CAN)
13	Nic Bouzakis (USA)
14	Vasile Marcu (MDA)
15	Omar Gazashvili (GEO)
16	Emre Kural (TUR)
17	William Betancourt (PUR)
18	Adilet Almukhamedov (KAZ)
19	Tai Lok Ming (HKG)
20	Simone Piroddu (ITA)
