= 2024 U23 World Wrestling Championships – Men's Greco-Roman 55 kg =

Men's Greco-Roman 55 kg at the 2024 U23 World Championships
- Venue: Tirana Olympic Park
- Dates: 22–23 October
- Competitors: 17 from 15 nations

Medalists
gold medal	Ali Ahmadi Vafa	Iran
silver medal	Rashad Mammadov	Azerbaijan
bronze medal	Kohei Yamagiwa	Japan
bronze medal	Vishvajit More	India

The men's Greco-Roman 55 kilograms is a competition featured at the 2024 U23 World Wrestling Championships, and was held in Tirana, Albania on 22 and 23 October 2024.

This Greco-Roman wrestling competition consists of a single-elimination tournament, with a repechage used to determine the winner of two bronze medals. The two finalists face off for gold and silver medals. Each wrestler who loses to one of the two finalists moves into the repechage, culminating in a pair of bronze medal matches featuring the semifinal losers each facing the remaining repechage opponent from their half of the bracket.

== Results ==
Legend

- F — Won by fall

=== Final ===
Final
Rashad Mammadov (AZE)	3
Ali Ahmadi Vafa (IRI)	11

=== Top half ===
Round of 32
Billy Sullivan (USA)	18
Dieymer Rosal (VEN)	10

Round of 16
Shi Huoying (CHN)	8
Cristopher Verástegui (COL)	7^{F}
Billy Sullivan (USA)	4
Rashad Mammadov (AZE)	12
Andi Muça (ALB)	0
Arayik Topalyan (ARM)	8
Kohei Yamagiwa (JPN)	15
Emre Mutlu (TUR)	6

Quarterfinals
Cristopher Verástegui (COL)	0
Rashad Mammadov (AZE)	9
Arayik Topalyan (ARM)	4
Kohei Yamagiwa (JPN)	12

Semifinals
Rashad Mammadov (AZE)	12
Kohei Yamagiwa (JPN)	2

=== Bottom half ===
Round of 32

Round of 16
Adam Ulbashev (AIN)	8
Tamazi Glonti (GEO)	2
Ali Ahmadi Vafa (IRI)	8
Ivan Stefansky (UKR)	0
Maksim Stupakevich (AIN)	3
Yerbol Kamaliyev (KAZ)	4^{F}
Vishvajit More (IND)	13
Leonid Moroz (MDA)	4

Quarterfinals
Adam Ulbashev (AIN)	1
Ali Ahmadi Vafa (IRI)	7
Yerbol Kamaliyev (KAZ)	0
Vishvajit More (IND)	9

Semifinals
Ali Ahmadi Vafa (IRI)	14
Vishvajit More (IND)	5

=== Repechage ===
Repechage round 2
Billy Sullivan (USA)	WO
~~Cristopher Verástegui (COL)~~
Ivan Stefansky (UKR)	2
Adam Ulbashev (AIN)	3

Bronze medals
Billy Sullivan (USA)	1
Kohei Yamagiwa (JPN)	11
Adam Ulbashev (AIN)	10
Vishvajit More (IND)	14

== Final standing ==
Rank	Athlete
1st place, gold medalist(s)	Ali Ahmadi Vafa (IRI)
2nd place, silver medalist(s)	Rashad Mammadov (AZE)
3rd place, bronze medalist(s)	Kohei Yamagiwa (JPN)
3rd place, bronze medalist(s)	Vishvajit More (IND)
5	Billy Sullivan (USA)
5	Adam Ulbashev (AIN)
7	Yerbol Kamaliyev (KAZ)
8	Arayik Topalyan (ARM)
9	Dieymer Rosal (VEN)
10	Emre Mutlu (TUR)
11	Leonid Moroz (MDA)
12	Tamazi Glonti (GEO)
13	Ivan Stefansky (UKR)
14	Shi Huoying (CHN)
15	Maksim Stupakevich (AIN)
16	Andi Muça (ALB)
—	Cristopher Verástegui (COL)
