= 2021 World Wrestling Championships – Men's Greco-Roman 67 kg =

Wrestling competitions

Men's Greco-Roman 67 kg at the 2021 World Championships
- Venue: Nye Jordal Amfi
- Dates: 9–10 October 2021
- Competitors: 27 from 27 nations

Medalists
gold medal	Mohammad Reza Geraei	Iran
silver medal	Nazir Abdullaev	RWF
bronze medal	Ramaz Zoidze	Georgia
bronze medal	Almat Kebispayev	Kazakhstan

The men's Greco-Roman 67 kilograms is a competition featured at the 2021 World Wrestling Championships, and was held in Oslo, Norway on 9 and 10 October.

This Greco-Roman wrestling competition consists of a single-elimination tournament, with a repechage used to determine the winner of two bronze medals. The two finalists face off for gold and silver medals. Each wrestler who loses to one of the two finalists moves into the repechage, culminating in a pair of bronze medal matches featuring the semifinal losers each facing the remaining repechage opponent from their half of the bracket.

== Results ==
Legend

- F — Won by fall

=== Final ===
Final
Mohammad Reza Geraei (IRI)	5
Nazir Abdullaev (RWF)	2

=== Top half ===
Round of 32
Peyton Omania (USA)	0
Hasrat Jafarov (AZE)	10
Gaurav Duhoon (IND)	4
Andreas Vetsch (SUI)	0
Mamadassa Sylla (FRA)	4
Slavik Galstyan (ARM)	5
Elmer Mattila (FIN)	1
Sebastian Nađ (SRB)	3
Zaur Kabaloev (ITA)	8
Gilbert Kaboche (KEN)	0

Round of 16
Mohammad Reza Geraei (IRI)	5^{F}
Tsuchika Shimoyamada (JPN)	6
Hasrat Jafarov (AZE)	8
Gaurav Duhoon (IND)	0
Slavik Galstyan (ARM)	5
Sebastian Nađ (SRB)	8
Zaur Kabaloev (ITA)	2
Ramaz Zoidze (GEO)	11

Quarterfinals
Mohammad Reza Geraei (IRI)	11
Hasrat Jafarov (AZE)	0
Sebastian Nađ (SRB)	1
Ramaz Zoidze (GEO)	8

Semifinals
Mohammad Reza Geraei (IRI)	7
Ramaz Zoidze (GEO)	6

=== Bottom half ===
Round of 32
Konstantin Stas (BUL)	2
Maksim Nehoda (BLR)	11
Morten Thoresen (NOR)	5
Diego Martínez (MEX)	3
Oleksii Masyk (UKR)	4
Marlen Asikeev (KGZ)	7
Ryu Han-su (KOR)	0
Mateusz Bernatek (POL)	7
Nazir Abdullaev (RWF)	4
István Váncza (HUN)	1
Witalis Lazovski (GER)	10
Ott Saar (EST)	0

Round of 16
Almat Kebispayev (KAZ)	9^{F}
Maksim Nehoda (BLR)	0
Morten Thoresen (NOR)	6
Marlen Asikeev (KGZ)	4
Mateusz Bernatek (POL)	0
Nazir Abdullaev (RWF)	5
Witalis Lazovski (GER)	1
Murat Fırat (TUR)	1

Quarterfinals
Almat Kebispayev (KAZ)	9^{F}
Morten Thoresen (NOR)	6
Nazir Abdullaev (RWF)	2
Murat Fırat (TUR)	1

Semifinals
Almat Kebispayev (KAZ)	5
Nazir Abdullaev (RWF)	10

=== Repechage ===
Repechage round 1
István Váncza (HUN)	1
Mateusz Bernatek (POL)	3

Repechage round 2
Tsuchika Shimoyamada (JPN)	0
Hasrat Jafarov (AZE)	7
Mateusz Bernatek (POL)	5
Murat Fırat (TUR)	7

Bronze medals
Hasrat Jafarov (AZE)	0
Ramaz Zoidze (GEO)	8
Murat Fırat (TUR)	4
Almat Kebispayev (KAZ)	7

== Final standing ==
Rank	Athlete
1st place, gold medalist(s)	Mohammad Reza Geraei (IRI)
2nd place, silver medalist(s)	Nazir Abdullaev (RWF)
3rd place, bronze medalist(s)	Ramaz Zoidze (GEO)
3rd place, bronze medalist(s)	Almat Kebispayev (KAZ)
5	Hasrat Jafarov (AZE)
5	Murat Fırat (TUR)
7	Mateusz Bernatek (POL)
8	Sebastian Nađ (SRB)
9	Morten Thoresen (NOR)
10	Witalis Lazovski (GER)
11	Zaur Kabaloev (ITA)
12	Maksim Nehoda (BLR)
13	Marlen Asikeev (KGZ)
14	Slavik Galstyan (ARM)
15	Gaurav Duhoon (IND)
16	István Váncza (HUN)
17	Mamadassa Sylla (FRA)
18	Oleksii Masyk (UKR)
19	Diego Martínez (MEX)
20	Konstantin Stas (BUL)
21	Elmer Mattila (FIN)
22	Tsuchika Shimoyamada (JPN)
23	Andreas Vetsch (SUI)
24	Ryu Han-su (KOR)
25	Gilbert Kaboche (KEN)
26	Peyton Omania (USA)
27	Ott Saar (EST)
