= 2024 U23 World Wrestling Championships – Men's Greco-Roman 67 kg =

Wrestling competitions

Men's Greco-Roman 67 kg at the 2024 U23 World Championships
- Venue: Tirana Olympic Park
- Dates: 21–22 October
- Competitors: 28 from 26 nations

Medalists
gold medal	Razzak Beishekeev	Kyrgyzstan
silver medal	Diego Chkhikvadze	Georgia
bronze medal	Arslanbek Salimov	Poland
bronze medal	Daniial Agaev	Authorised Neutral Athletes

The men's Greco-Roman 67 kilograms is a competition featured at the 2024 U23 World Wrestling Championships, and was held in Tirana, Albania on 21 and 22 October 2024.

This Greco-Roman wrestling competition consists of a single-elimination tournament, with a repechage used to determine the winner of two bronze medals. The two finalists face off for gold and silver medals. Each wrestler who loses to one of the two finalists moves into the repechage, culminating in a pair of bronze medal matches featuring the semifinal losers each facing the remaining repechage opponent from their half of the bracket.

== Results ==
Legend

- F — Won by fall

=== Final ===
Final
Razzak Beishekeev (KGZ)	6
Diego Chkhikvadze (GEO)	1

=== Top half ===
Round of 32
~~Ahmad Reza Mohsennejad (IRI)~~
Shon Nadorgin (ISR)	WO
Arslanbek Salimov (POL)	10
Ádám Pohilec (HUN)	4
Guan Changwei (CHN)	9
Georgi Anachkov (BUL)	0
Daniel Dajani (ALB)	1
Razzak Beishekeev (KGZ)	10
Farid Khalilov (AZE)	4
Niklas Öhlén (SWE)	2
Néstor Almanza (CHI)	3
Robert Perez (USA)	3

Round of 16
Sachin (IND)	10
Shon Nadorgin (ISR)	7
Arslanbek Salimov (POL)	1
Guan Changwei (CHN)	1
Razzak Beishekeev (KGZ)	4
Farid Khalilov (AZE)	1
Robert Perez (USA)	0
Haruto Yabe (JPN)	8

Quarterfinals
Sachin (IND)	1
Arslanbek Salimov (POL)	9
Razzak Beishekeev (KGZ)	9
Haruto Yabe (JPN)	0

Semifinals
Arslanbek Salimov (POL)	0
Razzak Beishekeev (KGZ)	10

=== Bottom half ===
Round of 32
Sahak Hovhannisyan (ARM)	7
Artur Jeremejev (EST)	1
Gavin Eldridge (CAN)	0
Alexandr Gurali (MDA)	8
Yanis Nifri (FRA)	0
Diego Chkhikvadze (GEO)	9
Andrea Setti (ITA)	0
Oleh Khalilov (UKR)	9
Viachaslau Zhehalau (AIN)	3
Azat Sarıyar (TUR)	11
Dinmukhamed Koshkar (KAZ)	5
Adomas Grigaliūnas (LTU)	1

Round of 16
William Reenberg (DEN)	3
Sahak Hovhannisyan (ARM)	4
Alexandr Gurali (MDA)	0
Diego Chkhikvadze (GEO)	8
Oleh Khalilov (UKR)	10
Azat Sarıyar (TUR)	1
Dinmukhamed Koshkar (KAZ)	5
Daniial Agaev (AIN)	7

Quarterfinals
Sahak Hovhannisyan (ARM)	1
Diego Chkhikvadze (GEO)	2
Oleh Khalilov (UKR)	1
Daniial Agaev (AIN)	2

Semifinals
Diego Chkhikvadze (GEO)	4
Daniial Agaev (AIN)	4

=== Repechage ===
Repechage round 1
Daniel Dajani (ALB)	0
Farid Khalilov (AZE)	8
Yanis Nifri (FRA)	12
Alexandr Gurali (MDA)	6

Repechage round 2
Farid Khalilov (AZE)	6
Haruto Yabe (JPN)	4
Yanis Nifri (FRA)	2
Sahak Hovhannisyan (ARM)	2

Bronze medals
Farid Khalilov (AZE)	4
Arslanbek Salimov (POL)	8
Yanis Nifri (FRA)	1
Daniial Agaev (AIN)	2

== Final standing ==
Rank	Athlete
1st place, gold medalist(s)	Razzak Beishekeev (KGZ)
2nd place, silver medalist(s)	Diego Chkhikvadze (GEO)
3rd place, bronze medalist(s)	Arslanbek Salimov (POL)
3rd place, bronze medalist(s)	Daniial Agaev (AIN)
5	Farid Khalilov (AZE)
5	Yanis Nifri (FRA)
7	Oleh Khalilov (UKR)
8	Sahak Hovhannisyan (ARM)
9	Shon Nadorgin (ISR)
10	Alexandr Gurali (MDA)
11	Azat Sarıyar (TUR)
12	Haruto Yabe (JPN)
13	Guan Changwei (CHN)
14	Sachin (IND)
15	Din Koshkar (KAZ)
16	Robert Perez (USA)
17	Ádám Pohilec (HUN)
18	Néstor Almanza (CHI)
19	William Reenberg (DEN)
20	Viachaslau Zhehalau (AIN)
21	Niklas Öhlén (SWE)
22	Adomas Grigaliunas (LTU)
23	Artur Jeremejev (EST)
24	Daniel Dajani (ALB)
25	Gavin Eldridge (CAN)
26	Georgi Anachkov (BUL)
27	Andrea Setti (ITA)
—	Ahmad Reza Mohsennejad (IRI)
