= 2022 U23 World Wrestling Championships – Men's Greco-Roman 67 kg =

Wrestling competitions

Men's Greco-Roman 67 kg at the 2022 U23 World Championships
- Venue: Pontevedra Municipal Sports Hall
- Dates: 18–19 October
- Competitors: 22 from 22 nations

Medalists
gold medal	Danial Sohrabi	Iran
silver medal	Gagik Snjoyan	France
bronze medal	Diego Chkhikvadze	Georgia
bronze medal	Kyotaro Sogabe	Japan

The men's Greco-Roman 67 kilograms is a competition featured at the 2022 U23 World Wrestling Championships, and was held in Pontevedra, Spain on 18 and 19 October 2022. The qualification rounds were held on 18 October while medal matches were held on the 2nd day of the competition. A total of 23 wrestlers competed in this event, limited to athletes whose body weight was less than 77 kilograms.

This Greco-Roman wrestling competition consists of a single-elimination tournament, with a repechage used to determine the winner of two bronze medals. The two finalists face off for gold and silver medals. Each wrestler who loses to one of the two finalists moves into the repechage, culminating in a pair of bronze medal matches featuring the semifinal losers each facing the remaining repechage opponent from their half of the bracket.

== Results ==
Legend

- F — Won by fall

=== Final ===
Final
Danial Sohrabi (IRI)	17
Gagik Snjoyan (FRA)	7

=== Top half ===
Round of 32
Diego Chkhikvadze (GEO)	8
Ashu Bazard (IND)	0
Julián Horta (COL)	0
Danial Sohrabi (IRI)	4^{F}
Elmer Mattila (FIN)	3
Almatbek Amanbek (KAZ)	1

Round of 16
Alexei Hahlovschi (MDA)	0
István Váncza (HUN)	8
Diego Chkhikvadze (GEO)	9
Håvard Jørgensen (NOR)	2
Vilius Savickas (LTU)	0
Danial Sohrabi (IRI)	9
Elmer Mattila (FIN)	0
Amanat Samat Uulu (KGZ)	8

Quarterfinals
István Váncza (HUN)	1
Diego Chkhikvadze (GEO)	3
Danial Sohrabi (IRI)	9^{F}
Amanat Samat Uulu (KGZ)	2

Semifinals
Diego Chkhikvadze (GEO)	3
Danial Sohrabi (IRI)	6

=== Bottom half ===
Round of 32
Ivo Iliev (BUL)	4
Dmitro Miroshnyk (UKR)	4
Sahak Hovhannisyan (ARM)	6
Niklas Öhlén (SWE)	5
Aleksander Mielewczyk (POL)	0
Peyton Omania (USA)	4^{F}

Round of 16
Begmyrat Nobatow (TKM)	0
Ivo Iliev (BUL)	7
Sahak Hovhannisyan (ARM)	1
Gagik Snjoyan (FRA)	3
Abdelrahman Omar (EGY)	0
Peyton Omania (USA)	7
Kyotaro Sogabe (JPN)	9
Ramazan Can Aktaş (TUR)	5

Quarterfinals
Ivo Iliev (BUL)	0
Gagik Snjoyan (FRA)	6
Peyton Omania (USA)	4
Kyotaro Sogabe (JPN)	13

Semifinals
Gagik Snjoyan (FRA)	9
Kyotaro Sogabe (JPN)	1

=== Repechage ===
Repechage round 1
Julián Horta (COL)	8
Vilius Savickas (LTU)	0

Repechage round 2
Julián Horta (COL)	7
Amanat Samat Uulu (KGZ)	3
Sahak Hovhannisyan (ARM)	10
Ivo Iliev (BUL)	0

Bronze medals
Julián Horta (COL)	1
Diego Chkhikvadze (GEO)	3
Sahak Hovhannisyan (ARM)	1
Kyotaro Sogabe (JPN)	3

== Final standing ==
Rank	Athlete
1st place, gold medalist(s)	Danial Sohrabi (IRI)
2nd place, silver medalist(s)	Gagik Snjoyan (FRA)
3rd place, bronze medalist(s)	Diego Chkhikvadze (GEO)
3rd place, bronze medalist(s)	Kyotaro Sogabe (JPN)
5	Julián Horta (COL)
5	Sahak Hovhannisyan (ARM)
7	Peyton Omania (USA)
8	Ivo Iliev (BUL)
9	Amanat Samat Uulu (KGZ)
10	István Váncza (HUN)
11	Elmer Mattila (FIN)
12	Niklas Öhlén (SWE)
13	Ramazan Can Aktaş (TUR)
14	Dmitro Miroshnyk (UKR)
15	Håvard Jørgensen (NOR)
16	Almatbek Amanbek (KAZ)
17	Aleksander Mielewczyk (POL)
18	Begmyrat Nobatow (TKM)
19	Abdelrahman Omar (EGY)
20	Alexei Hahlovschi (MDA)
21	Ashu Bazard (IND)
22	Vilius Savickas (LTU)
