= Mohammad Reza Geraei =

Iranian Greco-Roman wrestler

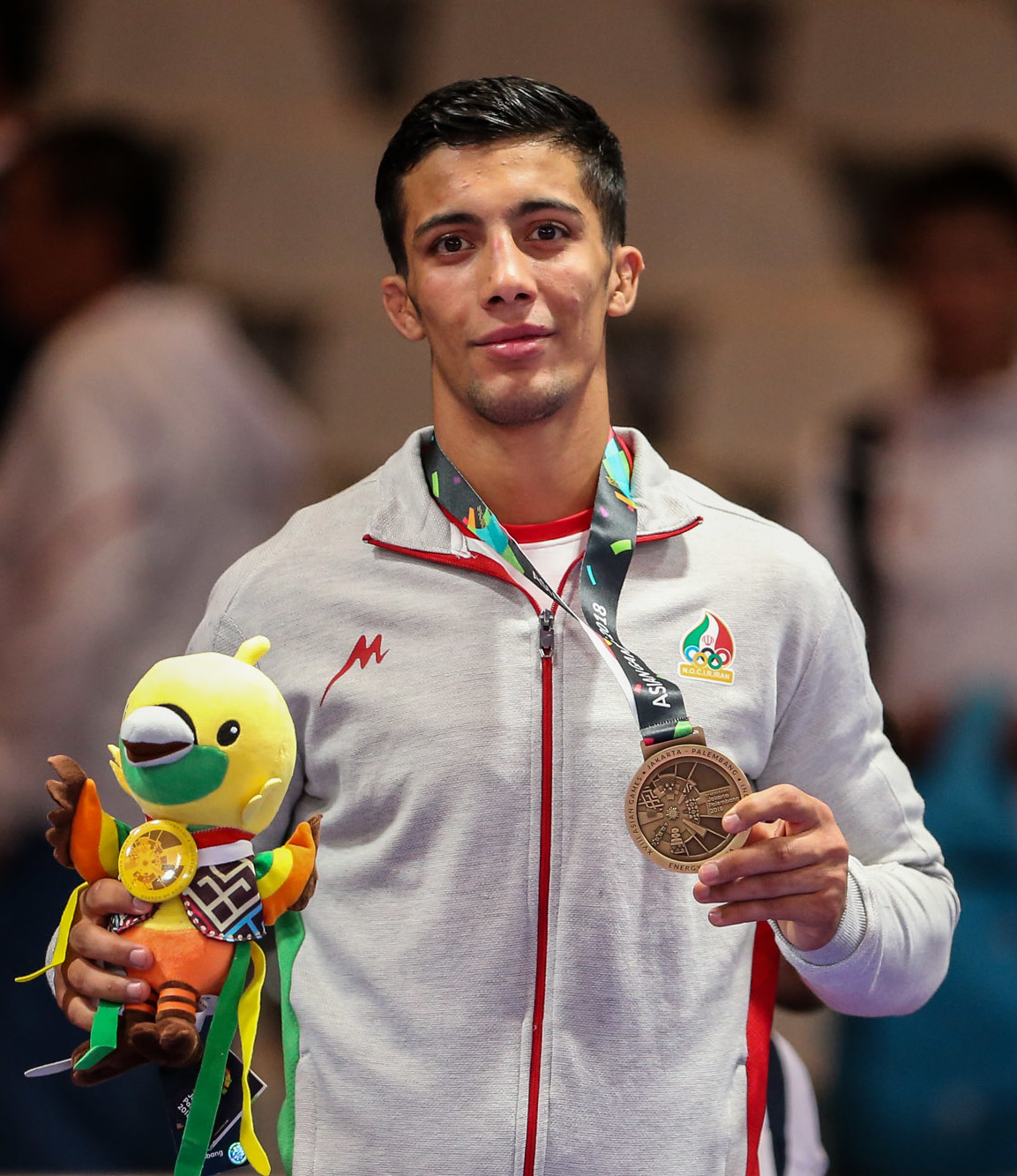
- Geraei at the 2018 Asian Games

Personal information
- Native name: محمدرضا گرایی
- Nickname: The Iceman
- Nationality: Iran
- Born: 25 July 1996 (age 30) Shiraz, Iran
- Height: 182 cm (6 ft 0 in)
- Weight: 70 kg (154 lb)

Sport
- Country: Iran
- Sport: Greco-Roman wrestling
- Weight class: 67 kg
- Coached by: Rahim Givi; Mohammad Bana
Medal record
Men's Greco-Roman wrestling
Representing Iran
Olympic Games
| Gold medal – first place | 2020 Tokyo | 67 kg |
World Championships
| Gold medal – first place | 2021 Oslo | 67 kg |
| Silver medal – second place | 2022 Belgrade | 67 kg |
| Bronze medal – third place | 2023 Belgrade | 67 kg |
Asian Games
| Bronze medal – third place | 2018 Jakarta | 67 kg |
Asian Championships
| Gold medal – first place | 2019 Xi'an | 72 kg |
Olympic Qualification Tournament
| Gold medal – first place | 2021 Almaty | 67 kg |
Bolat Turlykhanov Cup
| Gold medal – first place | 2022 Almaty | 72 kg |
World U23 Championships
| Gold medal – first place | 2019 Budapest | 72 kg |
Asian Junior Championship
| Silver medal – second place | 2016 Manila | 60 kg |

Mohammad Reza Geraei (Persian: محمدرضا گرایی, born 25 July 1996), is an Iranian Greco-Roman wrestler. At the 2020 Summer Olympics held in Tokyo, Japan, he won the gold medal in the men's 67 kg event. In 2018, he won one of the bronze medals in the men's 67 kg event at the Asian Games held in Jakarta, Indonesia.

== Career ==
In 2019, he won the gold medal in the 72 kg event at the 2019 Asian Wrestling Championships held in Xi'an, China. At the 2019 World U23 Wrestling Championship held in Budapest, Hungary, he won the gold medal in the men's 72 kg event. In the final, he defeated Sanan Suleymanov of Azerbaijan. In the same year, he also won the silver medal in the 77 kg event at the 2019 Asian U23 Wrestling Championship held in Ulaanbaatar, Mongolia. At the 2021 Asian Wrestling Olympic Qualification Tournament held in Almaty, Kazakhstan, he won the gold medal in the men's 67 kg. He qualified for the Tokyo Olympics by winning the semi-finals.

== World U23 Championship 2019 ==
In the weight category of 72 kg, Mohammad Reza Garai passed the barrier of last year's champion Genghis Arsalan 10: 3 in the first round with a result of 10: 3. At this stage, Garai defeated Ramaz Zweidze, the silver medalist of the world under-23s from Georgia, with a result of 7: 5 and a technical blow, and reached the semi-finals. In this match, he defeated Maksim Yutoshenko from Ukraine with a result of 6 to 2 and advanced to the final match. In the final match, he defeated Suleimanov of Azerbaijan with a score of 7: 0 and won the gold medal.

== Asian Championship 2019 ==
In the 72 kg weight category, Mohammad Reza Garai, after a break in the first round, won the second round with a score of 8: 0 against Aram Wardanian, an Asian bronze medalist from Uzbekistan, and reached the semi-finals. At this stage, he crossed the barrier of world silver medalist Dimio Jadryev from Kazakhstan with a result of 9: 3 and reached the final match. In the final, Garai defeated Hugh Joon Zhang of China 5–0 in the final to win the gold medal.

== Asian Games 2018 ==
In the first round, Mohammad Reza Garai defeated Abdul Karim al-Hassan Suri in the first round, and in the second round, he defeated Olympic and world bronze medalist Al-Murat Tasmuradov of Uzbekistan to advance to the semifinals. In this match, he competed against the Kazakh Almaty Kabispayev, the silver and bronze medalist of the world, who was defeated by a technical blow at the very beginning of the wrestling and failed to reach the final. In the 67 kg weight class, Garai competed against Taiwan's Hong Ying-hova, defeating his opponent 11–0 in less than a minute to win the bronze medal.

== Personal life ==
His older brother Mohammadali Geraei also competes in the Greco-Roman wrestling.

On 28 December 2025, Geraei publicly supported the 2025–2026 Iranian protests on his Instagram by sharing a picture of a protester's resistance to physical force from armed members of the Police Command of the Islamic Republic of Iran by sitting in front of them and stating: "Protest is not just shouting, sometimes sitting silently is also protest."

== Greco-Roman record ==
International Senior GRECO-ROMAN Matches
| Res. | Record | Opponent | Score | Date | Event | Location |
2021 World Championships (gold) at 67 kg
| Win | 16-0 | (Russia) Nazir Abdullaev | 5-2 | October 9, 2021 | 2021 World Championships | Oslo, Norway |
| Win | 15-0 | (Georgia (country)) Ramaz Zoidze | 7-6 | October 8, 2021 | 2021 World Championships | Oslo, Norway |
| Win | 14-0 | (Azerbaijan) Hasrat Jafarov | TF 11–0 | October 8, 2021 | 2021 World Championships | Oslo, Norway |
| Win | 13-0 | (Japan) Shimoyamada Tsuchika | 6-5 | October 8, 2021 | 2021 World Championships | Oslo, Norway |
2020 Summer Olympics (gold) at 67 kg
| Win | 12-0 | (Ukraine) Parviz Nasibov | 9-1 | August 3–4, 2021 | 2020 Summer Olympics | Tokyo, Japan |
| Win | 11-0 | (Georgia (country)) Ramaz Zoidze | 6-1 | August 3–4, 2021 | 2020 Summer Olympics | Tokyo, Japan |
| Win | 10-0 | (Germany) Frank Stäbler | TF 5-5 | August 3–4, 2021 | 2020 Summer Olympics | Tokyo, Japan |
| Win | 9-0 | (Colombia) Horta Stiven | 9-0 | August 3–4, 2021 | 2020 Summer Olympics | Tokyo, Japan |
2019 U23 World Championships (gold) at 72 kg
| Win | 8-0 | (Azerbaijan) SANAN SOLEYMANOV | TF 7–0 | October 28–30, 2019 | 2019 U23 World Championships | Budapest, Hungary |
| Win | 7–0 | (Ukraine) MAXIM KELASHINKOV | TF 9–3 | October 28–30, 2019 | 2019 U23 World Championships | Budapest, Hungary |
| Win | 6-0 | (Georgia (country)) Ramaz Zoidze | TF 7–5 | October 28–30, 2019 | 2019 U23 World Championships | Budapest, Hungary |
| Win | 5–0 | (Russia) MAGMOD YARBILOV | TF 3–2 | October 28–30, 2019 | 2019 U23 World Championships | Budapest, Hungary |
| Win | 4–0 | (Turkey) CHENGIZ ARSALAN | TF 9–3 | October 28–30, 2019 | 2019 U23 World Championships | Budapest, Hungary |
2019 Asian Championships (gold) at 72 kg
| Win | 3-0 | (China) Zhang hujun | 5–0 | 24 April 2019 | 2019 Asian Continental Championships | Xi'an, China |
| Win | 2-0 | (Kazakhstan) Demo zhadarev | 9–3 | 24 April 2019 | 2019 Asian Continental Championships | Xi'an, China |
| Win | 1-0 | (Uzbekistan) aram vardanian | 9–0 | 24 April 2019 | 2019 Asian Continental Championships | Xi'an, China |

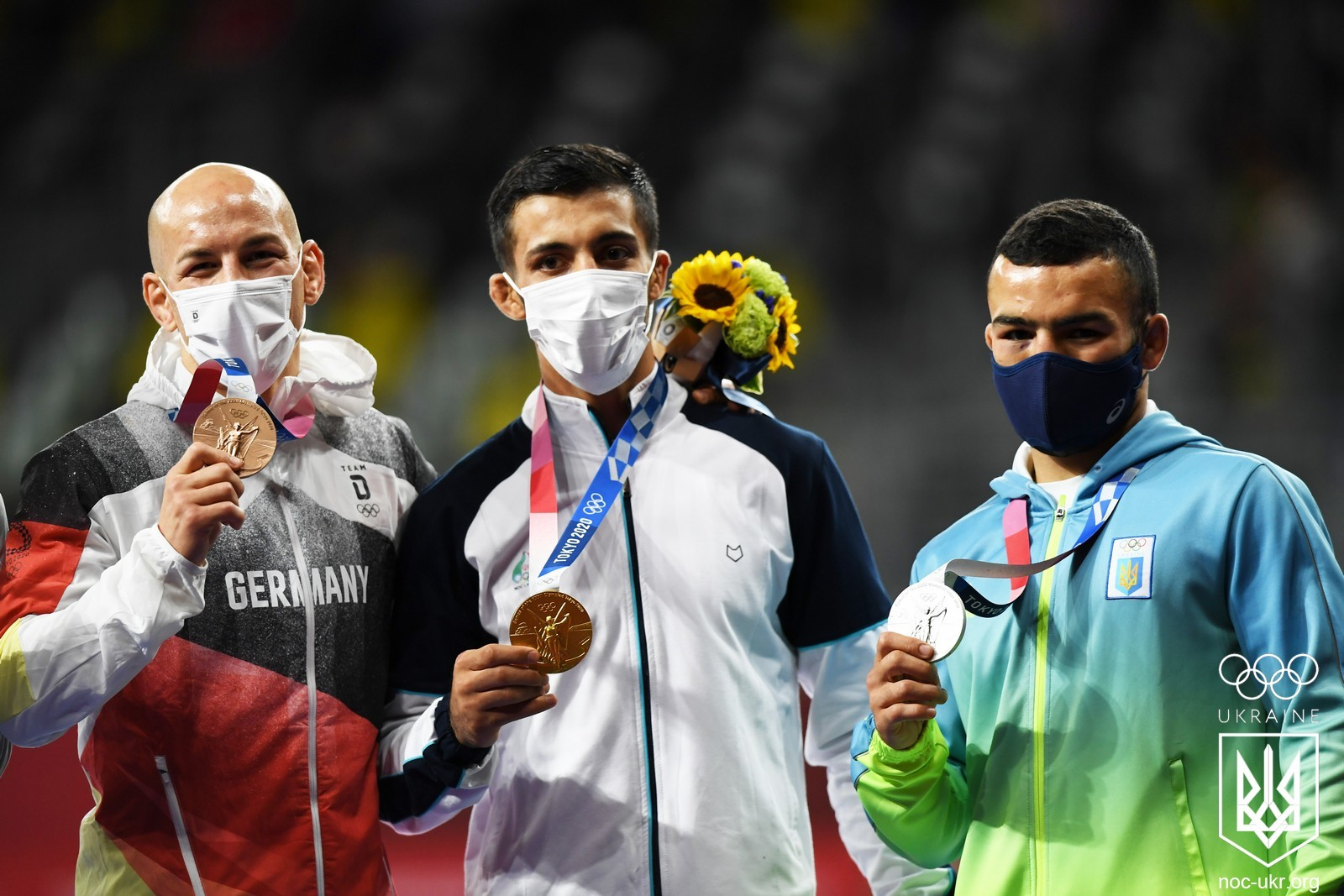
Geraei in Olympic 2020 medal ceremony

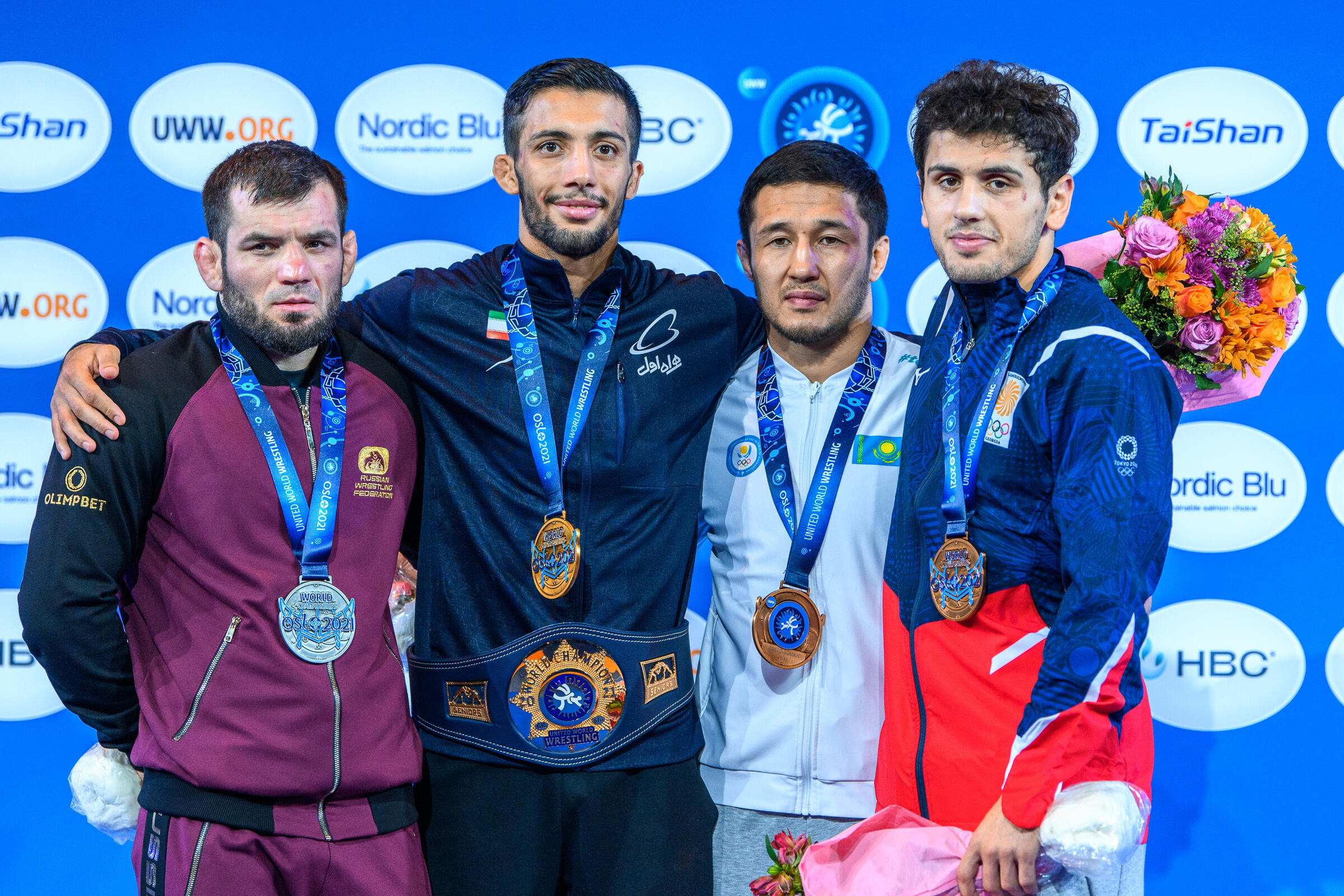
Mohammadreza geraei World champion Norway

== Achievements ==
| Year | Tournament | Location | Result | Event |
|---|---|---|---|---|
| 2018 | Asian Games | Jakarta, Indonesia | 3rd | Greco-Roman 67 kg |
| 2019 | Asian Championships | Xi'an, China | 1st | Greco-Roman 72 kg |
| 2019 | World U23 Wrestling Championships | Budapest, Hungary | 1st | Greco-Roman 72 kg |
| 2021 | Summer Olympics | Tokyo, Japan | 1st | Greco-Roman 67 kg |
| 2021 | World Wrestling Championships | Oslo, Norway | 1st | Greco-Roman 67 kg |
| 2022 | World Wrestling Championships | Belgrade, Serbia | 2nd | Greco-Roman 67 kg |
