= 2020 Individual Wrestling World Cup – Men's Greco-Roman 67 kg =

The Men's Greco-Roman 67 kg is a competition featured at the 2020 Individual Wrestling World Cup, and was held in Belgrade, Serbia on 12 and 13 December 2020.

== Medalists ==
Gold	Nazir Abdullaev; Russia
Silver	Islambek Dadov; Azerbaijan
Bronze	Roman Pacurkowski; Poland
Bronze	Slavik Galstyan; Armenia

== Results ==
Legend

- F — Won by fall
- WO — Won by walkover

1/16 finals
	Score	
Ruben Marvice (ITA)	0–9	Islambek Dadov (AZE)
Alex Pineda (PAN)	0–7	Nilton Soto (PER)

1/8 finals
Khalmurat Ibragimov (KGZ)	11
Gagik Snjoyan (FRA)	5
Ashu Bazard (IND)	3
Atakan Yüksel (TUR)	3
Roman Pacurkowski (POL)	5
Nazir Abdullaev (RUS)	8
Konstantin Stas (BUL)	1
Davor Štefanek (SRB)	11
Artur Politaiev (UKR)	9
Witalis Lazovski (GER)	0
István Váncza (HUN)	1
Donior Islamov (MDA)	2
Slavik Galstyan (ARM)	7
Cristóbal Torres (CHI)	0
Islambek Dadov (AZE)	9
Nilton Soto (PER)	0

Quarterfinals
Khalmurat Ibragimov (KGZ)	8
Ashu Bazard (IND)	0
Nazir Abdullaev (RUS)	8
Davor Štefanek (SRB)	1
Artur Politaiev (UKR)	9
Donior Islamov (MDA)	0
Slavik Galstyan (ARM)	4
Islambek Dadov (AZE)	7

Semifinals
Khalmurat Ibragimov (KGZ)	0
Nazir Abdullaev (RUS)	9
Artur Politaiev (UKR)	2
Islambek Dadov (AZE)	8

Final
Nazir Abdullaev (RUS)	2
Islambek Dadov (AZE)	1

Repechage round 1
Ruben Marvice (ITA)	1
Nilton Soto (PER)	2

Repechage round 2
Roman Pacurkowski (POL)	WO
Davor Štefanek (SRB)
Nilton Soto (PER)	0
Slavik Galstyan (ARM)	9

Bronze medals
Roman Pacurkowski (POL)	6
Khalmurat Ibragimov (KGZ)	3
Slavik Galstyan (ARM)	4^{F}
Artur Politaiev (UKR)	4
