= 2024 U23 World Wrestling Championships – Men's freestyle 97 kg =

Wrestling competitions

Men's freestyle 97 kg at the 2024 U23 World Championships
- Venue: Tirana Olympic Park
- Dates: 26–27 October
- Competitors: 17 from 15 nations

Medalists
gold medal	Rizabek Aitmukhan	Kazakhstan
silver medal	Mahdi Hajiloueian	Iran
bronze medal	Vicky Hooda	India
bronze medal	Uladzislau Kazlou	Authorised Neutral Athletes

The men's freestyle 97 kilograms is a competition featured at the 2024 U23 World Wrestling Championships, and will be held in Tirana, Albania on 25 and 26 October 2024.

This freestyle wrestling competition consists of a single-elimination tournament, with a repechage used to determine the winner of two bronze medals. The two finalists face off for gold and silver medals. Each wrestler who loses to one of the two finalists moves into the repechage, culminating in a pair of bronze medal matches featuring the semifinal losers each facing the remaining repechage opponent from their half of the bracket.

== Results ==
Legend

- F — Won by fall

=== Final ===
Final
Mahdi Hajiloueian (IRI)	6
Rizabek Aitmukhan (KAZ)	11

=== Top half ===
Round of 32
Aslan Abakarov (AZE)	0
Mahdi Hajiloueian (IRI)	10

Round of 16
Sergey Sargsyan (ARM)	0
Ivan Prymachenko (UKR)	3
Mahdi Hajiloueian (IRI)	10
Massoma Endene (USA)	6
Emmanuel Sarfo (GHA)	0
Radu Lefter (MDA)	10
Vicky Hooda (IND)	2^{F}
Merab Suleimanishvili (GEO)	4

Quarterfinals
Ivan Prymachenko (UKR)	2
Mahdi Hajiloueian (IRI)	12
Radu Lefter (MDA)	0
Vicky Hooda (IND)	5

Semifinals
Mahdi Hajiloueian (IRI)	12
Vicky Hooda (IND)	8

=== Bottom half ===
Round of 32

Round of 16
Taron Shahinyan (POL)	2
Uladzislau Kazlou (AIN)	12
Callum Knox (CAN)	0
Rizabek Aitmukhan (KAZ)	11
Rıfat Gıdak (TUR)	0
Shamil Gadzhialiev (AIN)	3
Wulahati Aman (CHN)	0
Yuta Sasaki (JPN)	2

Quarterfinals
Uladzislau Kazlou (AIN)	0
Rizabek Aitmukhan (KAZ)	10
Shamil Gadzhialiev (AIN)	5
Yuta Sasaki (JPN)	2

Semifinals
Rizabek Aitmukhan (KAZ)	7
Shamil Gadzhialiev (AIN)	4

=== Repechage ===
Repechage round 1
Aslan Abakarov (AZE)	7
Massoma Endene (USA)	7

Repechage round 2
Massoma Endene (USA)	2
Ivan Prymachenko (UKR)	2
Callum Knox (CAN)	1
Uladzislau Kazlou (AIN)	11

Bronze medals
Ivan Prymachenko (UKR)	2
Vicky Hooda (IND)	7
Uladzislau Kazlou (AIN)	2
Shamil Gadzhialiev (AIN)	2

== Final standing ==
Rank	Athlete
1st place, gold medalist(s)	Rizabek Aitmukhan (KAZ)
2nd place, silver medalist(s)	Mahdi Hajiloueian (IRI)
3rd place, bronze medalist(s)	Vicky Hooda (IND)
3rd place, bronze medalist(s)	Uladzislau Kazlou (AIN)
5	Ivan Prymachenko (UKR)
5	Shamil Gadzhialiev (AIN)
7	Massoma Endene (USA)
8	Radu Lefter (MDA)
9	Yuta Sasaki (JPN)
10	Aslan Abakarov (AZE)
11	Taron Shahinyan (POL)
12	Callum Knox (CAN)
13	Merab Suleimanishvili (GEO)
14	Wulahati Aman (CHN)
15	Sergey Sargsyan (ARM)
16	Rıfat Gıdak (TUR)
17	Emmanuel Sarfo (GHA)
