= 2024 U23 World Wrestling Championships – Men's Greco-Roman 72 kg =

Wrestling competitions

Men's Greco-Roman 72 kg at the 2024 U23 World Championships
- Venue: Tirana Olympic Park
- Dates: 21–22 October
- Competitors: 30 from 28 nations

Medalists
gold medal	Giorgi Chkhikvadze	Georgia
silver medal	Shant Khachatryan	Armenia
bronze medal	Danial Sohrabi	Iran
bronze medal	Imran Aliev	Authorised Neutral Athletes

The men's Greco-Roman 72 kilograms is a competition featured at the 2024 U23 World Wrestling Championships, and was held in Tirana, Albania on 21 and 22 October 2024.

This Greco-Roman wrestling competition consists of a single-elimination tournament, with a repechage used to determine the winner of two bronze medals. The two finalists face off for gold and silver medals. Each wrestler who loses to one of the two finalists moves into the repechage, culminating in a pair of bronze medal matches featuring the semifinal losers each facing the remaining repechage opponent from their half of the bracket.

== Results ==
Legend

- F — Won by fall

=== Final ===
Final
Shant Khachatryan (ARM)	1
Giorgi Chkhikvadze (GEO)	3

=== Top half ===
Round of 32
Kristo Merilain (EST)	0
Danial Sohrabi (IRI)	8
Shant Khachatryan (ARM)	10
Michael Portmann (SUI)	0
Kensaku Ono (JPN)	13
Ardit Zeneli (ALB)	2
Xu Bin (CHN)	2
Georgios Barbanos (SWE)	4
Junior Benítez (ESP)	0
Luka Ivančić (CRO)	8
Ruslan Nurullayev (AZE)	8
Illia Valeuski (AIN)	7
Abror Atabaev (UZB)	8
Brandon Navarro (PUR)	0

Round of 16
Justus Scott (USA)	1
Danial Sohrabi (IRI)	10
Shant Khachatryan (ARM)	9
Kensaku Ono (JPN)	0
Georgios Barbanos (SWE)	3
Luka Ivančić (CRO)	3
Ruslan Nurullayev (AZE)	2
Abror Atabaev (UZB)	3

Quarterfinals
Danial Sohrabi (IRI)	0
Shant Khachatryan (ARM)	9^{F}
Georgios Barbanos (SWE)	3
Abror Atabaev (UZB)	2

Semifinals
Shant Khachatryan (ARM)	9
Georgios Barbanos (SWE)	0

=== Bottom half ===
Round of 32
Imran Aliev (AIN)	9
Marian Holubovskyi (UKR)	0
Nilson Sinisterra (COL)	3
Vilius Savickas (LTU)	4
Giorgi Chkhikvadze (GEO)	6
Piotr Stolarczyk (POL)	0
Giovanni Alessio (ITA)	1
Arionas Kolitsopoulos (GRE)	4
Aakash Punia (IND)	3
Gagik Snjoyan (FRA)	8
Dimitar Georgiev (BUL)	0
Krisztofer Klányi (HUN)	5^{F}
Muhammed Ali Göçmen (TUR)	1
Adilkhan Nurlanbekov (KGZ)	1

Round of 16
Imran Aliev (AIN)	11
Vilius Savickas (LTU)	0
Giorgi Chkhikvadze (GEO)	14
Arionas Kolitsopoulos (GRE)	5
Gagik Snjoyan (FRA)	4
Krisztofer Klányi (HUN)	1
Adilkhan Nurlanbekov (KGZ)	5
Merey Maulitkanov (KAZ)	2

Quarterfinals
Imran Aliev (AIN)	0
Giorgi Chkhikvadze (GEO)	4
Gagik Snjoyan (FRA)	1
Adilkhan Nurlanbekov (KGZ)	7

Semifinals
Giorgi Chkhikvadze (GEO)	7
Adilkhan Nurlanbekov (KGZ)	0

=== Repechage ===
Repechage round 1
Michael Portmann (SUI)	3
Kensaku Ono (JPN)	1
Piotr Stolarczyk (POL)	1
Arionas Kolitsopoulos (GRE)	3

Repechage round 2
Michael Portmann (SUI)	0
Danial Sohrabi (IRI)	8
Arionas Kolitsopoulos (GRE)	0
Imran Aliev (AIN)	8

Bronze medals
Danial Sohrabi (IRI)	9
Georgios Barbanos (SWE)	0
Imran Aliev (AIN)	11^{F}
Adilkhan Nurlanbekov (KGZ)	1

== Final standing ==
Rank	Athlete
1st place, gold medalist(s)	Giorgi Chkhikvadze (GEO)
2nd place, silver medalist(s)	Shant Khachatryan (ARM)
3rd place, bronze medalist(s)	Danial Sohrabi (IRI)
3rd place, bronze medalist(s)	Imran Aliev (AIN)
5	Georgios Barbanos (SWE)
5	Adilkhan Nurlanbekov (KGZ)
7	Abror Atabaev (UZB)
8	Gagik Snjoyan (FRA)
9	Arionas Kolitsopoulos (GRE)
10	Krisztofer Klányi (HUN)
11	Kensaku Ono (JPN)
12	Luka Ivančić (CRO)
13	Ruslan Nurullayev (AZE)
14	Vilius Savickas (LTU)
15	Michael Portmann (SUI)
16	Illia Valeuski (AIN)
17	Nilson Sinisterra (COL)
18	Aakash Punia (IND)
19	Xu Bin (CHN)
20	Merey Maulitkanov (KAZ)
21	Ardit Zeneli (ALB)
22	Muhammed Ali Göçmen (TUR)
23	Giovanni Alessio (ITA)
24	Piotr Stolarczyk (POL)
25	Justus Scott (USA)
26	Dimitar Georgiev (BUL)
27	Kristo Merilain (EST)
28	Junior Benítez (ESP)
29	Brandon Navarro (PUR)
30	Marian Holubovskyi (UKR)
