= 2024 U23 World Wrestling Championships – Men's Greco-Roman 63 kg =

Wrestling competitions

Men's Greco-Roman 63 kg at the 2024 U23 World Championships
- Venue: Tirana Olympic Park
- Dates: 22–23 October
- Competitors: 23 from 21 nations

Medalists
gold medal	Vitalie Eriomenco	Moldova
silver medal	Komei Sawada	Japan
bronze medal	Mairbek Salimov	Poland
bronze medal	Erfan Jarkani	Iran

The men's Greco-Roman 63 kilograms is a competition featured at the 2024 U23 World Wrestling Championships, and was held in Tirana, Albania on 22 and 23 October 2024.

This Greco-Roman wrestling competition consists of a single-elimination tournament, with a repechage used to determine the winner of two bronze medals. The two finalists face off for gold and silver medals. Each wrestler who loses to one of the two finalists moves into the repechage, culminating in a pair of bronze medal matches featuring the semifinal losers each facing the remaining repechage opponent from their half of the bracket.

== Results ==
Legend

- F — Won by fall
- WO — Won by walkover

=== Final ===
Final
Komei Sawada (JPN)	2
Vitalie Eriomenco (MDA)	10

=== Top half ===
Round of 32
Adrian Anton (ROU)	10
Talibsho Khaibarau (AIN)	0
Vasyl Myshanych (UKR)	9
Héctor Sánchez (MEX)	6
Mairbek Salimov (POL)	9
Jonathan Gurule (USA)	0

Round of 16
Bredi Slinkers (NED)	5
Mukhammed Kalbaev (KGZ)	0
Adrian Anton (ROU)	1
Bekir Ateş (TUR)	10
Komei Sawada (JPN)	7
Vasyl Myshanych (UKR)	0
Mairbek Salimov (POL)	8
Ziya Babashov (AZE)	0

Quarterfinals
Bredi Slinkers (NED)	1
Bekir Ateş (TUR)	3
Komei Sawada (JPN)	3
Mairbek Salimov (POL)	1

Semifinals
Bekir Ateş (TUR)	0
Komei Sawada (JPN)	7

=== Bottom half ===
Round of 32
Arman Vardanyan (ARM)	8
Amarildo Laska (ALB)	0
Romeo Beridze (GEO)	9
Li Quanzhi (CHN)	0
Ankit (IND)	6
Munthir Jandu (KSA)	1
Tino Ojala (FIN)	0
Erfan Jarkani (IRI)	8

Round of 16
Nursultan Bazarbayev (KAZ)	0
Arman Vardanyan (ARM)	10
Romeo Beridze (GEO)	1
Ronaldo Sánchez (COL)	3
Vitalie Eriomenco (MDA)	9
Ankit (IND)	0
Erfan Jarkani (IRI)	6
Astemir Bizhoev (AIN)	2

Quarterfinals
Arman Vardanyan (ARM)	6
Ronaldo Sánchez (COL)	3
Vitalie Eriomenco (MDA)	3
Erfan Jarkani (IRI)	2

Semifinals
Arman Vardanyan (ARM)	5
Vitalie Eriomenco (MDA)	14

=== Repechage ===
Repechage round 2
Vasyl Myshanych (UKR)	6
Mairbek Salimov (POL)	11^{F}
Ankit (IND)
Erfan Jarkani (IRI)	WO

Bronze medals
Mairbek Salimov (POL)	9^{F}
Bekir Ateş (TUR)	4
Erfan Jarkani (IRI)	8
Arman Vardanyan (ARM)	0

== Final standing ==
Rank	Athlete
1st place, gold medalist(s)	Vitalie Eriomenco (MDA)
2nd place, silver medalist(s)	Komei Sawada (JPN)
3rd place, bronze medalist(s)	Mairbek Salimov (POL)
3rd place, bronze medalist(s)	Erfan Jarkani (IRI)
5	Bekir Ateş (TUR)
5	Arman Vardanyan (ARM)
7	Adrian Anton (ROU)
8	Romeo Beridze (GEO)
9	Bredi Slinkers (NED)
10	Ronaldo Sánchez (COL)
11	Vasyl Myshanych (UKR)
12	Ankit (IND)
13	Héctor Sánchez (MEX)
14	Astemir Bizhoev (AIN)
15	Munthir Jandu (KSA)
16	Mukhammed Kalbaev (KGZ)
17	Ziya Babashov (AZE)
18	Amarildo Laska (ALB)
19	Tino Ojala (FIN)
20	Jonathan Gurule (USA)
21	Li Quanzhi (CHN)
22	Talibsho Khaibarau (AIN)
23	Nursultan Bazarbayev (KAZ)
