= 2026 World Wrestling Championships – Men's Greco-Roman 72 kg =

Wrestling competitions

Men's Greco-Roman 72 kg at the 2026 World Championships
- Venue: Barys Arena
- Dates: 25–26 October 2026
- Competitors: 27 from 27 nations

Medalists
gold medal	Danial Sohrabi	Iran
silver medal	István Váncza	Hungary
bronze medal	Iuri Lomadze	Georgia
bronze medal	Amantur Ismailov	Kyrgyzstan

The men's Greco-Roman 72 kilograms is a competition featured at the 2026 World Wrestling Championships, and was held in Astana, Kazakhstan on 25 and 26 October 2026.

This Greco-Roman wrestling competition consists of a single-elimination tournament, with a repechage used to determine the winner of two bronze medals. The two finalists face off for gold and silver medals. Each wrestler who loses to one of the two finalists moves into the repechage, culminating in a pair of bronze medal matches, featuring the semifinal losers each facing the remaining repechage opponent from their half of the bracket.

== Results ==
Legend

- F — Won by fall
- R — Retired

=== Final ===
Final
István Váncza (HUN)	0
Danial Sohrabi (IRI)	4

=== Top half ===
Round of 32
Néstor Almanza (CHI)	7
Dimitar Georgiev (BUL)	3
Mihai Petic (MDA)	3
Ashot Khachatryan (ARM)	8
Alejandro Varela (GUA)	0
Parviz Nasibov (UKR)	8
Julián Horta (COL)	3
Mohamed Ehab Khalil (EGY)	9
Aleksander Mielewczyk (POL)	7
Pavel Puklavec (CRO)	8

Round of 16
István Váncza (HUN)	5
Néstor Almanza (CHI)	3
Ashot Khachatryan (ARM)	0
Parviz Nasibov (UKR)	9
Iuri Lomadze (GEO)	9
Mohamed Ehab Khalil (EGY)	0
Pavel Puklavec (CRO)	4
Almatbek Amanbek (KAZ)	6^{F}

Quarterfinals
István Váncza (HUN)	3
Parviz Nasibov (UKR)	0
Iuri Lomadze (GEO)	6
Almatbek Amanbek (KAZ)	3

Semifinals
István Váncza (HUN)	3
Iuri Lomadze (GEO)	3

=== Bottom half ===
Round of 32
Nilton Soto (PER)	0
Christoffer Dahlén (SWE)	9
Kim Gyeong-tae (KOR)	1
Leng Ji (CHN)	11
Amantur Ismailov (KGZ)	9
Cengiz Arslan (TUR)	1
Benji Peak (USA)	4
Aliaksandr Liavonchyk (BLR)	1
Abror Atabaev (UZB)	6
Mingiian Goriaev (RUS)	15
Karanjit Singh (IND)	2
Rintaro Sogabe (JPN)	3

Round of 16
Danial Sohrabi (IRI)	10
Christoffer Dahlén (SWE)	0
Leng Ji (CHN)	0
Amantur Ismailov (KGZ)	8
Benji Peak (USA)	4
Mingiian Goriaev (RUS)	5
Rintaro Sogabe (JPN)	4
Ulvu Ganizade (AZE)	9

Quarterfinals
Danial Sohrabi (IRI)	9
Amantur Ismailov (KGZ)	0
Mingiian Goriaev (RUS)	7
Ulvu Ganizade (AZE)	6^{R}

Semifinals
Danial Sohrabi (IRI)	9
Mingiian Goriaev (RUS)	0

=== Repechage ===
Repechage round 2
Néstor Almanza (CHI)	0
Parviz Nasibov (UKR)	5
Christoffer Dahlén (SWE)	0
Amantur Ismailov (KGZ)	9

Bronze medals
Parviz Nasibov (UKR)	4
Iuri Lomadze (GEO)	7
Amantur Ismailov (KGZ)	10
Mingiian Goriaev (RUS)	0

== Final standing ==
Rank	Athlete
1st place, gold medalist(s)	Danial Sohrabi (IRI)
2nd place, silver medalist(s)	István Váncza (HUN)
3rd place, bronze medalist(s)	Iuri Lomadze (GEO)
3rd place, bronze medalist(s)	Amantur Ismailov (KGZ)
5	Parviz Nasibov (UKR)
5	Mingiian Goriaev (RUS)
7	Almatbek Amanbek (KAZ)
8	Leng Ji (CHN)
9	Christoffer Dahlén (SWE)
10	Néstor Almanza (CHI)
11	Benji Peak (USA)
12	Rintaro Sogabe (JPN)
13	Ulvu Ganizade (AZE)
14	Pavel Puklavec (CRO)
15	Mohamed Ehab Khalil (EGY)
16	Ashot Khachatryan (ARM)
17	Aleksander Mielewczyk (POL)
18	Abror Atabaev (UZB)
19	Dimitar Georgiev (BUL)
20	Mihai Petic (MDA)
21	Julián Horta (COL)
22	Karanjit Singh (IND)
23	Aliaksandr Liavonchyk (BLR)
24	Cengiz Arslan (TUR)
25	Kim Gyeong-tae (KOR)
26	Alejandro Varela (GUA)
27	Nilton Soto (PER)
