= Navid Zanganeh =

Iranian mixed martial artist and Greco-Roman wrestler (born 1996)

- Born: July 16, 1996 (age 30); Eslamshahr, Iran
- Other names: Cheetah
- Height: 5 ft 7 in (1.70 m)
- Weight: 154.6 lb (70 kg; 11 st 1 lb)
- Division: Lightweight
- Fighting out of: Coquitlam, British Columbia, Canada
- Team: InFight MMA
- Years active: 2022–present

Mixed martial arts record
- Total: 6
- Wins: 5
- By knockout: 1
- By submission: 3
- By decision: 1
- Losses: 1
- By decision: 1

Other information
- Mixed martial arts record from Sherdog

Navid Zanganeh (Persian: نوید زنگنه; born July 16, 1996) is an Iranian mixed martial artist and former wrestler, who competes in the Lightweight division.

== Wrestling career ==
Zanganeh wrestled for club Atrak Khorasan and represented Iran on the world stage.

During the 2018 Senior U23 World Championships in Bucharest Zanganeh earned a bronze medal after defeating Azerbaijani wrestler Ismail Abdullaev.

At the 2019 U-23 Senior Asian Championships Zanganeh won a silver medal after beating opponents from Kyrgyzstan, Turkmenistan, and Kazakhstan before facing defeat in the finals.

The Takhti freestyle wrestling tournament took place on 7 and 8 February 2019 with representatives from Azerbaijan, Turkey, Russia, Armenia, Hungary, the Netherlands, Belarus, Kyrgyzstan and Georgia. Zanganeh placed third and was a part of Iran's overall victory in the tournament.

== Personal life ==
=== Arrest and asylum in Canada ===
Zanganeh was shot at anti-government rally in Tehran and was subsequently arrested after being taken to hospital. He was detained for 15 days and was eventually released from Fashafaviye prison. Zanganeh was immediately released from his club Atrak Khorasan and was unable to wrestle for Iran. After the arrest was made public, Zanganeh emigrated to Canada in the hopes to resume his wrestling career representing Canada.

=== Violation of anti-doping rule and sanction ===
The Canadian Centre for Ethics in Sport (CCES) gave an announcement which stated that Zanganeh was subjected to a four-year suspension due to a violation of anti-doping regulations. The violation stemmed from the detection of oxandrolone, a prohibited anabolic substance, in a urine sample of Zanganeh. The urine sample was collection during an in-competition sampling session on March 11, 2023. The sanction entails an ineligibility to participate in any sport signatory to the Canadian Anti-Doping Program (CADP) at any capacity (including training with teammates), and concludes on April 24, 2027.

=== Criminal Charges ===
A Vancouver Police investigation into alleged drug trafficking at a Marpole nightclub has led to the arrest of Zanganeh. VPD launched the investigation in December 2023 after receiving a tip that drug trafficking was taking place inside Gallery Nightclub located near SW Marine and Hudson Street. Over the course of a 15-month investigation, officers gathered evidence that led to the arrest of Zanganeh, who was the employee of the nightclub. The BC Prosecution Service has approved charges against Zanganeh with four counts of possession of a weapon for a dangerous purpose, three counts of trafficking a controlled substance, one count of possession for the purpose of trafficking, and one count of possession of an unauthorized weapon.

== Mixed martial arts career ==
Navid began his MMA career in Vancouver, Canada. His head coach is currently Achilles Estremadura out of InFight MMA in Coquitlam, British Columbia.

== Mixed martial arts record ==
Professional record breakdown
6 matches	5 wins	1 loss
By knockout	1	0
By submission	3	0
By decision	1	1

Res.	Record	Opponent	Method	Event	Date	Round	Time	Location	Notes
Win	5–1	Jeremy Henry	Decision (unanimous)	Battlefield Fight League 82	January 23, 2025	5	5:00	Vancouver, British Columbia, Canada	Won the vacant BFL Lightweight Championship.
Win	4–1	Javier Cíntora	Submission (arm-triangle choke)	Battlefield Fight League 79	February 8, 2024	1	3:16	Vancouver, British Columbia, Canada	
Win	3–1	David Briones	KO (slam and punches)	Battlefield Fight League 78	October 19, 2023	1	3:25	Vancouver, British Columbia, Canada	
Win	2–1	Daniel Palomares	Submission (guillotine choke)	Battlefield Fight League 77	June 9, 2023	1	0:45	Vancouver, British Columbia, Canada	
Loss	1–1	Xavier Nash	Decision (split)	Battlefield Fight League 76	March 30, 2023	5	5:00	Vancouver, British Columbia, Canada	Lost the interim BFL Lightweight Championship.
Win	1–0	Austin Batra	Submission (rear-naked choke)	Battlefield Fight League 73	July 7, 2022	1	2:34	Vancouver, British Columbia, Canada	Lightweight debut. Won the interim BFL Lightweight Championship.
