= Danial Sohrabi =

Iranian Greco-Roman wrestler

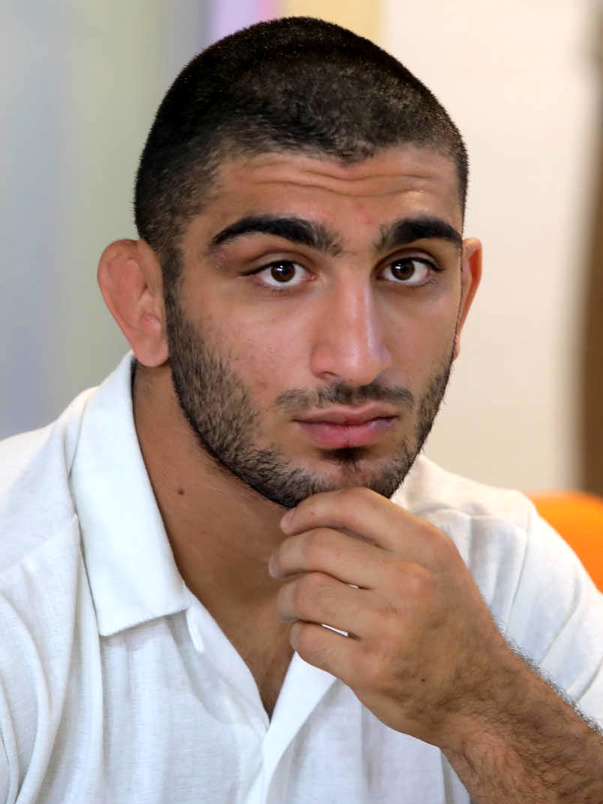
- Sohrabi in 2025

Personal information
- Native name: دانیال سهرابی
- Nationality: Iranian
- Born: 17 June 2003 (age 23) Andimeshk, Khuzestan, Iran

Sport
- Country: Iran
- Sport: Greco-Roman wrestling
- Weight class: 67 kg
Medal record
Men's Greco-Roman wrestling
Representing Iran
World Championships
| Gold medal – first place | 2026 Astana | 72 kg |
| Bronze medal – third place | 2025 Zagreb | 72 kg |
Asian Championships
| Gold medal – first place | 2025 Amman | 72 kg |
Asian Games
| Bronze medal – third place | 2022 Hangzhou | 67 kg |
World Cup
| Gold medal – first place | 2022 Baku | Team |
Grand Prix
| Gold medal – first place | 2023 Budapest | 72 kg |
| Gold medal – first place | 2023 Bishkek | 67 kg |
| Gold medal – first place | 2025 Ulaanbaatar | 72 kg |
| Gold medal – first place | 2026 Ulaanbaatar | 72 kg |
| Silver medal – second place | 2025 Zagreb | 72 kg |
| Bronze medal – third place | 2024 Budapest | 72 kg |
World U23 Championships
| Gold medal – first place | 2022 Pontevedra | 67 kg |
| Bronze medal – third place | 2024 Tirana | 72 kg |
World Junior Championship
| Bronze medal – third place | 2022 Sofia | 67 kg |
Asian Cadet Championship
| Silver medal – second place | 2019 Nur-Sultan | 60 kg |

Seyed Danial Sohrabi (Persian: سید دانیال سهرابی, born 17 June 2003) is an Iranian Greco-Roman wrestler. He won the gold medal at the 2025 Asian Wrestling Championships.

== Wrestling career ==
In 2022, Sohrabi won the bronze medal in the 67 kg event at 2022 World Junior Wrestling Championships held in Sofia, Bulgaria.

Sohrabi won gold medal at 2022 U23 World Wrestling Championships in category 67 kg after being down 7 points and then coming back 17–7 in final match against Gagik Snjoyan.

Sohrabi won one of the bronze medals in the 67 kg event at the 2022 Asian Games held in Hangzhou, China.

In the 2025 Asian Wrestling Championships held in Amman, Jordan, he defeated Jordanian Omar Al-Daraghmeh 11–0 in the first round, Indian Kuldeep Malik 8–0 in the quarterfinals, and Chinese Leng Ji 9–0 in the semifinals and reached the final. In the final match, he defeated Uzbek Abdullo Aliev with 8-0 technical superiority and won the gold medal.

== Personal life ==
On 29 December 2025, Sohrabi publicly supported the 2025–2026 Iranian protests by reposting images of the protests, but deleted the post hours later.
