= Amantur Ismailov =

Kyrgyzstani Greco-Roman wrestler

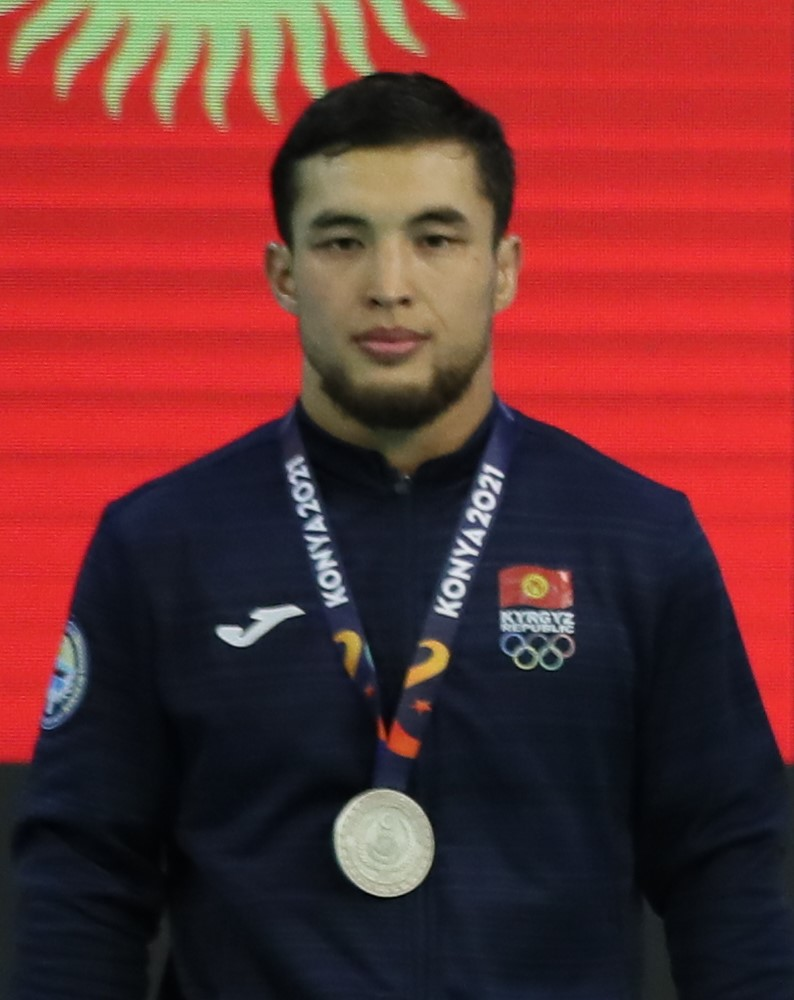
- Ismailov at the 2021 Islamic Solidarity Games in Konya, Turkey

Personal information
- Born: 29 December 1997 (age 28) Bishkek, Kyrgyzstan

Sport
- Country: Kyrgyzstan
- Sport: Amateur wrestling
- Weight class: 67 kg
- Event: Greco-Roman
Medal record
Men's Greco-Roman wrestling
Representing Kyrgyzstan
World Championships
| Bronze medal – third place | 2022 Belgrade | 67 kg |
| Bronze medal – third place | 2026 Astana | 72 kg |
Asian Games
| Bronze medal – third place | 2018 Jakarta | 67 kg |
Asian Championships
| Bronze medal – third place | 2021 Almaty | 67 kg |
Islamic Solidarity Games
| Silver medal – second place | 2021 Konya | 67 kg |
Asian U23 Championship
| Bronze medal – third place | 2019 Ulaanbaatar | 67 kg |

Amantur Ismailov (Kyrgyz: Исмаилов Амантур Туратбекович, born 29 December 1997) is a Kyrgyzstani Greco-Roman wrestler. He won one of the bronze medals in the 67 kg event at the 2018 Asian Games held in Jakarta, Indonesia. Bronze medalist at the 2022 World Wrestling Championships held in Belgrad, Serbia.

== Career ==
At the 2019 Asian U23 Wrestling Championship in Ulaanbaatar, Mongolia, he won the bronze medal in the 67 kg event.

In 2021, Ismailov won one of the bronze medals in the 67 kg event at the Asian Wrestling Championships held in Almaty, Kazakhstan. In May 2021, he failed to qualify for the 2020 Summer Olympics at the World Olympic Qualification Tournament held in Sofia, Bulgaria.

Ismailov won the silver medal in his event at the 2021 Islamic Solidarity Games held in Konya, Turkey. He competed in the 67 kg event at the 2022 World Wrestling Championships held in Belgrade, Serbia and won bronze medal.

He competed at the 2024 Asian Wrestling Olympic Qualification Tournament in Bishkek, Kyrgyzstan and he earned a quota place for Kyrgyzstan for the 2024 Summer Olympics in Paris, France. He lost his bronze medal match in the 67 kg event at the Olympics.

== Achievements ==
| Year | Tournament | Location | Result | Event |
|---|---|---|---|---|
| 2018 | Asian Games | Jakarta, Indonesia | 3rd | Greco-Roman 67 kg |
| 2019 | U23 Senior Asian Championships | Ulaanbaatar, Mongolia | 3rd | Greco-Roman 67 kg |
| 2019 | Grand Prix of V. Balavadze and G. Kartozia | Tbilisi, Georgia | 2nd | Greco-Roman 67 kg |
| 2021 | XXIV Outstanding Ukrainian Wrestlers and Coaches Memorial | Kyiv, Ukraine | 3rd | Greco-Roman 67 kg |
| 2021 | Asian Championships | Almaty, Kazakhstan | 3rd | Greco-Roman 67 kg |
| 2022 | 2021 Islamic Solidarity Games | Konya, Turkey | 2nd | Greco-Roman 67 kg |
| 2022 | World Wrestling Championships | Belgrad, Serbia | 3rd | Greco-Roman 67 kg |
