= 2019 Asian U23 Wrestling Championships =

Wrestling competition in Ulaanbaatar, Mongolia

2019 Asian U23 Championships
- Host city: Ulaanbaatar, Mongolia
- Dates: March 21–24
- Stadium: Buyant Ukhaa Sport Palace

Champions
- Freestyle: Iran
- Greco-Roman: Iran
- Women: Mongolia

The 2019 U23 Senior Asian Wrestling Championship was the 1st edition of Asian U23 Wrestling Championships of combined events, and took place from March 21 to 24 in Ulaanbaatar, Mongolia.

== Medal table ==
Rank	Nation	Gold	Silver	Bronze	Total
1	Iran (IRI)	8	6	4	18
2	Mongolia (MGL)	7	4	9	20
3	India (IND)	5	6	5	16
4	Kyrgyzstan (KGZ)	5	4	3	12
5	Kazakhstan (KAZ)	4	7	9	20
6	Chinese Taipei (TPE)	1	0	0	1
7	Turkmenistan (TKM)	0	2	0	2
8	Tajikistan (TJK)	0	1	0	1
Totals (8 entries)		30	30	30	90

== Team ranking ==
Rank	Men's freestyle		Men's Greco-Roman		Women's freestyle	
Rank	Team	Points	Team	Points	Team	Points
1	Iran	200	Iran	202	Mongolia	200
2	Mongolia	177	Kyrgyzstan	182	India	190
3	Kazakhstan	146	Kazakhstan	167	Kazakhstan	162
4	India	140	India	128	Chinese Taipei	37
5	Kyrgyzstan	114	Mongolia	120	Kyrgyzstan	32

== Medal summary ==
=== Men's freestyle ===
Event	Gold	Silver	Bronze
57 kg	(India) Rahul Deswal	(Kyrgyzstan) Bekbolot Myrzanazar Uulu	(Mongolia) Tsermaagiin Chinzorig
61 kg	(Kyrgyzstan) Ulukbek Zholdoshbekov	(India) Sonba Tanaji Gongane	(Iran) Mohammad Namjoo-Motlagh
65 kg	(Mongolia) Tömör-Ochiryn Tulga	(Iran) Amir Mohammad Yazdani	(Kazakhstan) Ilyas Zhumay
65 kg	(Mongolia) Tömör-Ochiryn Tulga	(Iran) Amir Mohammad Yazdani	(India) Parveen
70 kg	(Mongolia) Enkhtuyaagiin Temüülen	(Iran) Farhad Nouri	(Kazakhstan) Aidyn Tazhigali
74 kg	(Mongolia) Batsuuriin Otgonbayar	(Iran) Navid Zanganeh	(Kazakhstan) Darkhan Yessangali
79 kg	(Iran) Ali Savadkouhi	(India) Veer Dev Gulia	(Kyrgyzstan) Atai Izabekov
86 kg	(Iran) Ahmad Bazri	(Turkmenistan) Döwletmyrat Orazgylyjow	(Mongolia) Ganbaataryn Gankhuyag
92 kg	(Iran) Arashk Mohebbi	(Turkmenistan) Azat Gajyýew	(Mongolia) Mönkhbaataryn Tsogtgerel
97 kg	(Iran) Abbas Foroutan	(Kazakhstan) Zhassulan Yermenbet	(Mongolia) Tömörbatyn Möngönshagai
125 kg	(Kazakhstan) Yusup Batirmurzaev	(Mongolia) Mönkhtöriin Lkhagvagerel	(Iran) Mohammad Moradi

=== Men's Greco-Roman ===
Event	Gold	Silver	Bronze
55 kg	(Kyrgyzstan) Sardarbek Konushbaev	(Iran) Pouya Dadmarz	(Mongolia) Mönkh-Erdeniin Davaabandi
60 kg	(Kyrgyzstan) Zholaman Sharshenbekov	(Kazakhstan) Dastan Zarlykhanov	(Iran) Mehdi Mohsennejad
63 kg	(Iran) Meisam Dalkhani	(Kyrgyzstan) Elmar Talantbek Uulu	(India) Vijay
67 kg	(Kazakhstan) Nurbek Kyzyrov	(Mongolia) Gankhuyagiin Khanbürged	(Kyrgyzstan) Amantur Ismailov
72 kg	(Iran) Amin Kavianinejad	(Tajikistan) Daler Rezazade	(Kyrgyzstan) Bek Konurbaev
77 kg	(Kyrgyzstan) Renat Iliaz Uulu	(Iran) Mohammad Reza Geraei	(Kazakhstan) Kaharman Kissymetov
82 kg	(Iran) Mehdi Ebrahimi	(Kazakhstan) Kuanyshbek Doszhanov	(India) Sanjeet
87 kg	(Iran) Mohammad Hadi Saravi	(Kyrgyzstan) Kalidin Asykeev	(Kazakhstan) Meirbek Kordabay
97 kg	(Kazakhstan) Olzhas Syrlybay	(India) Ravi Rathee	(Iran) Hassan Arianejad
130 kg	(Kyrgyzstan) Roman Kim	(Iran) Ali Akbar Yousefi	(Kazakhstan) Sarkis Pshenichnikov

=== Women's freestyle ===
Event	Gold	Silver	Bronze
50 kg	(Mongolia) Tsogt-Ochiryn Namuuntsetseg	(Kazakhstan) Svetlana Ankicheva	(India) Jyoti
53 kg	(Mongolia) Bayaraagiin Khaliunaa	(India) Reena	(Kazakhstan) Ellada Makhyaddinova
55 kg	(Kazakhstan) Marina Sedneva	(India) Anju	(Mongolia) Bat-Ochiryn Bolortuyaa
57 kg	(Mongolia) Boldsaikhan Khongorzul	(Kyrgyzstan) Nuraida Anarkulova	(Kazakhstan) Yekaterina Firstova
59 kg	(India) Manju Kumari	(Kazakhstan) Madina Bakbergenova	(Mongolia) Püreviin Otgonbayar
62 kg	(Mongolia) Ölziisaikhany Pürevsüren	(Kazakhstan) Irina Kuznetsova	(India) Radhika Jaglan
65 kg	(India) Tina	(Mongolia) Khürelkhüügiin Bolortuyaa	Not awarded as there were only two competitors.
68 kg	(India) Divya Kakran	(Mongolia) Enkhsaikhany Delgermaa	(Kazakhstan) Valeria Goncharova
72 kg	(India) Naina Kanwal	(Kazakhstan) Alexandra Zaitseva	(Mongolia) Dorjsürengiin Tsogzolmaa
76 kg	(Chinese Taipei) Chang Hui-tsz	(India) Pooja Sihag	(Mongolia) Naigalsürengiin Zagardulam

== Participating nations ==
- China (3)
- India (30)
- Iran (20)
- Kazakhstan (29)
- Kyrgyzstan (19)
- Mongolia (30)
- Singapore (1)
- Tajikistan (1)
- Turkmenistan (6)
- Chinese Taipei (2)
- Yemen (1)
