= Wrestling at the 2022 Mediterranean Games – Men's Greco-Roman 67 kg =

Wrestling competitions

Men's Greco-Roman 67 kg at the 2022 Mediterranean Games
- Venue: EMEC Hall
- Date: 26–27 June
- Competitors: 8 from 8 nations

Medalists
gold medal	Murat Fırat	Turkey
silver medal	Ishak Ghaiou	Algeria
bronze medal	Abdelrahman Omar	Egypt
bronze medal	Gagik Snjoyan	France

The Men's Greco-Roman 67 kg competition of the wrestling events at the 2022 Mediterranean Games in Oran, Algeria, was held from 26 June to 27 June at the EMEC Hall.

== Results ==
Legend

- F — Won by fall

Quarterfinals		Semifinals		Final
Ishak Ghaiou (ALG)	7
Pedro Caldas (POR)	1	Ishak Ghaiou (ALG)	3
Abdelrahman Omar (EGY)	9	Abdelrahman Omar (EGY)	1
Gjete Prenga (ALB)	0			Ishak Ghaiou (ALG)	6
Ignazio Sanfilippo (ITA)	8			Murat Fırat (TUR)	7
Mohamad Fawaz (SYR)	0	Ignazio Sanfilippo (ITA)	1
Gagik Snjoyan (FRA)	3	Murat Fırat (TUR)	6
Murat Fırat (TUR)	6

Bronze medals
Pedro Caldas (POR)	1
Abdelrahman Omar (EGY)	3
Gagik Snjoyan (FRA)	4
Ignazio Sanfilippo (ITA)	1
