= Nazir Abdullaev =

Russian Greco-Roman wrestler

Personal information
- Native name: Назир Рашидович Абудллаев
- Full name: Nazir Rashidovich Abdullaev
- Nationality: Russia
- Born: 14 June 1991 (age 35) Krasnodar, Russia
- Height: 167 cm (5 ft 6 in)

Sport
- Country: Russia
- Sport: Amateur wrestling
- Weight class: 67 kg
- Event: Greco-Roman

Achievements and titles
- World finals: (silver) (2021)
Medal record
Men's Greco-Roman wrestling
Representing Russian Wrestling Federation
World Championships
Silver medal – second place	2021 Oslo	67 kg
Representing Russia
Individual World Cup
Gold medal – first place	2020 Belgrade	67 kg
European Championships
Silver medal – second place	2020 Rome	67 kg
Matteo Pellicone Tournament
Bronze medal – third place	2021 Rome	67 kg

Nazir Rachidovitch Abdullaev (Russian: Назир Рашидович Абудллаев; born 14 June 1991) is a Russian Greco-Roman wrestler. He won the silver medal in the men's 67 kg event at both the 2021 World Wrestling Championships held in Oslo, Norway and the 2020 European Wrestling Championships held in Rome, Italy.

== Career ==
In 2020, he won the silver medal in the 67 kg event at the European Wrestling Championships held in Rome, Italy. In the final, he lost against Morten Thoresen of Norway.

In the same year, he won the gold medal in the 67 kg event at the Individual Wrestling World Cup held in Belgrade, Serbia. In 2021, he won one of the bronze medals in the 67 kg event at the Matteo Pellicone Ranking Series 2021 held in Rome, Italy.

== Achievements ==
Year	Tournament	Location	Result	Event
2020	European Championships	Rome, Italy	2nd	Greco-Roman 67 kg
2021	World Championships	Oslo, Norway	2nd	Greco-Roman 67 kg
