= Kohei Yamagiwa =

Japanese Greco-Roman wrestler

Personal information
- Native name: 山際 航平
- Born: 8 January 2003 (age 23) Mie Prefecture, Japan
- Height: 1.60 m (5 ft 3 in)
- Weight: 55 kg (121 lb; 8.7 st)

Sport
- Country: Japan
- Sport: Greco-Roman
- Event: 55 kg
Medal record
Men's Greco-Roman wrestling
Representing Japan
Asian Championships
Gold medal – first place	2025 Amman	55 kg
Dan Kolov - Nikola Petrov Tournament
Bronze medal – third place	2023 Sofia	55 kg
U23 World Championships
Bronze medal – third place	2024 Tirana	55 kg
Asian Cadets Championships
Bronze medal – third place	2019 Nur Sultan	51 kg
Japan National Championships
Silver medal – second place	2023 Tokyo	55 kg

Kohei Yamagiwa (born 8 January 2003) is a Japanese Greco-Roman wrestler competing in the 55 kg division. He won the gold medal at the 2025 Asian Wrestling Championships.

== Career ==
In the 2025 Asian Wrestling Championships held in Amman, Jordan, he reached the final by defeating South Korean Yu Jun-sik 11–1 with technical superiority in the first round, Chinese Lu Yun 6–0 in the quarterfinals, and North Korean Ro Yu-chol 11–9 in the semifinals. He won the gold medal by defeating Iraqi Sajjad Ali 7–1 in the final match.
