= Vishvajit More =

Indian Greco-Roman wrestler (born 2004)

Personal information
- Full name: Vishvajit Ramchandra More
- Born: 1 January 2004 (age 22) Sarawade, Maharashtra, India
- Military career
- Branch: Indian Army
- Service years: 2025–present
- Rank: Havildar
- Unit: Maratha Light Infantry

Sport
- Sport: Wrestling
- Weight class: 55 kg
- Event: Greco-Roman
Medal record
Men's Greco-Roman wrestling
Representing India
U23 World Championships
Silver medal – second place	2026 Las Vegas	55 kg
Bronze medal – third place	2024 Tirana	55 kg
Bronze medal – third place	2025 Novi Sad	55 kg
U23 Asian Championships
Silver medal – second place	2024 Amman	55 kg

Vishvajit Ramchandra More (born 1 January 2004) is an Indian greco-roman wrestler who competes in the 55 kg category. He has won a silver and two bronze medals at the U23 World Championships.

== Early life ==
More was born in Sarawade village near Radhanagari in the Kolhapur district of Maharashtra. He joined the Indian Army in 2025 through the Army Sports Entry Scheme as a Havildar.

== Career ==
More secured a silver medal in the men's Greco-Roman 55 kg category at the 2024 U23 Asian Championships held in Amman. He advanced to the final after defeating Kazakhstan's Azamat Kamilzhan Uulu, but lost to Kazakhstan's Yerbol Kamaliyev in the gold medal match. Later at the 2024 U23 World Championships held in Tirana, he won a bronze medal in the men's Greco-Roman 55 kg category. He defeated AIN (Individual Athlete) Adam Ulbashev in the bronze medal bout, winning 14–10.

At the 2025 U23 World Championships held in Novi Sad, he again won a bronze medal in the 55 kg Greco-Roman event. In the tournament he secured wins over Denis Florin Mihai (Romania) and Kenneth Andrew Crosby (USA) before losing in the quarter-final to Alibek Amirov, after which he advanced via repechage where he defeated Kazakhstan's Yerassyl Mmayrbekov 5–4 to claim bronze.
