= Abbas Foroutan =

Iranian wrestler (born 2000)

Personal information
- Native name: عباس فروتن
- Full name: Abbas Foroutan
- Nationality: Iranian
- Born: Babol, Mazandaran, Iran
- Occupation: Amateur wrestler
- Height: 1.83 m (6 ft 0 in)
- Weight: 96 kg (212 lb)

Sport
- Country: Iran
- Sport: Wrestling
- Event: Freestyle
- Club: Azadgan Babol
- Team: National Iran
- Coached by: Ali Shokripour
Medal record
Representing Iran
Men's freestyle wrestling
U20 World Championships
Silver medal – second place	2017 Athens	85 kg
Gold medal – first place	2018 Trnava	92 kg
Gold medal – first place	2019 Tallinn	97 kg
Asian Championship
Gold medal – first place	2017 Thailand	85 kg
Gold medal – first place	2018 New Delhi	92 kg
U23 Asian Championships
Gold medal – first place	2019 Mongolia	97 kg
International Tournament
Gold medal – first place	2021 Istanbul	125 kg

Abbas Foroutan (from Babol) is an Iranian freestyle wrestler. He won gold medals in the 92 kg and 97 kg weight classes at the 2018 and 2019 World Cadet Wrestling Championships.
