= Murat Fırat =

Turkish Greco-Roman wrestler

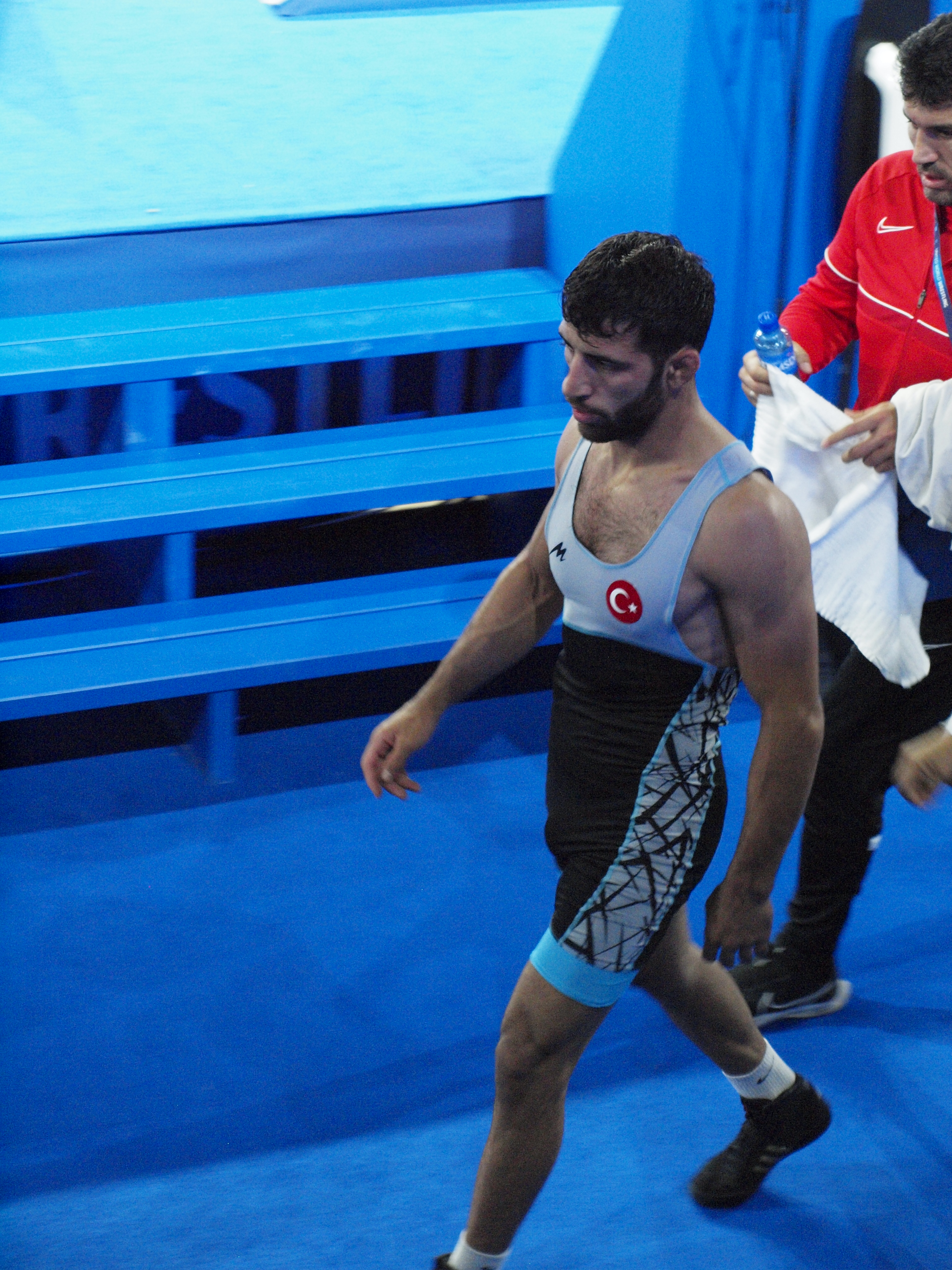

Personal information
- Born: 23 September 1997 (age 29) Şanlıurfa, Turkey

Sport
- Country: Turkey
- Sport: Amateur wrestling
- Event: Greco-Roman
- Club: Ankara Aski Sport Club
Medal record
Men's Greco-Roman wrestling
Representing Turkey
European Championships
Gold medal – first place	2022 Budapest	67 kg
Silver medal – second place	2026 Tirana	67 kg
Bronze medal – third place	2021 Warsaw	67 kg
Bronze medal – third place	2024 Bucharest	67 kg
Mediterranean Games
Gold medal – first place	2022 Oran	67 kg
Bronze medal – third place	2018 Tarragona	67 kg
Bronze medal – third place	2026 Taranto	67 kg
Vehbi Emre & Hamit Kaplan Tournament
Gold medal – first place	2018 Istanbul	67 kg
Gold medal – first place	2025 Kocaeli	67 kg
Bronze medal – third place	2023 Istanbul	67 kg
Bronze medal – third place	2026 Antalya	67 kg
Dan Kolov - Nikola Petrov Tournament
Gold medal – first place	2018 Sofia	67 kg
Grand Prix
Gold medal – first place	2021 Warsaw	67 kg
Gold medal – first place	2022 Zagreb	67 kg
Silver medal – second place	2025 Ulaanbaatar	67 kg
Silver medal – second place	2026 Ulaanbaatar	67 kg
European Juniors Championships
Gold medal – first place	2015 Istanbul	60 kg
Bronze medal – third place	2017 Dortmund	60 kg

Murat Fırat (born 23 September 1997) is a Turkish Greco-Roman wrestler competing in the 67 kg division. He is a member of Ankara ASKI. He won the gold medal at the 2022 European Wrestling Championships.

== Career ==
Murat Fırat captured bronze medal in men's Greco-Roman 67 kg at 2021 European Wrestling Championships.

He won the gold medal in the 67 kg event at the 2022 European Wrestling Championships held in Budapest, Hungary.

== Major results ==
Year	Tournament	Location	Result	Event
2018	Mediterranean Games	Tarragona, Spain	3rd	Greco-Roman 67 kg
2021	European Championships	Warsaw, Poland	3rd	Greco-Roman 67 kg
2021	World Championships	Oslo, Norway	5th	Greco-Roman 67 kg
2022	European Championships	Budapest, Hungary	1st	Greco-Roman 67 kg
2022	Mediterranean Games	Oran, Algeria	1st	Greco-Roman 67 kg
2024	European Championships	Bucharest, Romania	3rd	Greco-Roman 67 kg
2026	European Championships	Tirana, Albania	2nd	Greco-Roman 67 kg
