= 2022 European Wrestling Championships – Men's Greco-Roman 67 kg =

Wrestling competition

Men's Greco-Roman 67 kg at the 2022 European Wrestling Championships
- Venue: BOK Sports Hall
- Location: Budapest, Hungary
- Dates: 2-3 April
- Competitors: 18

Medalists
gold medal	Murat Fırat	Turkey
silver medal	István Váncza	Hungary
bronze medal	Slavik Galstyan	Armenia
bronze medal	Hasrat Jafarov	Azerbaijan

The Men's Greco-Roman 67 kg is a competition featured at the 2022 European Wrestling Championships, and was held in Budapest, Hungary on April 2 and 3.

== Results ==
Legend

- F — Won by fall
- WO — Won by walkover

=== Final ===
Final
István Váncza (HUN)	1
Murat Fırat (TUR)	3

=== Top half ===
Round of 32
Pedro Caldas (POR)	0
István Váncza (HUN)	8

Round of 16
Ramaz Zoidze (GEO)	9
Andreas Vetsch (SUI)	0
István Váncza (HUN)	9
Donior Islamov (MDA)	0
Slavik Galstyan (ARM)	5
Stefan Clément (FRA)	0
Mihai Mihuț (ROU)	0
Morten Thoresen (NOR)	2

Quarterfinals
Ramaz Zoidze (GEO)	2
István Váncza (HUN)	10^{F}
Slavik Galstyan (ARM)	9
Morten Thoresen (NOR)	0

Semifinals
István Váncza (HUN)	4
Slavik Galstyan (ARM)	2

=== Bottom half ===
Round of 32
Christoph Burger (AUT)	0
Mateusz Bernatek (POL)	9

Round of 16
Murat Fırat (TUR)	WO
~~Zelimkhan Abakarov (ALB)~~
Dmytro Miroshnyk (UKR)	0
Sebastian Nađ (SRB)	4
Ivo Iliev (BUL)	0
Mateusz Bernatek (POL)	9
Witalis Lazovski (GER)	1
Hasrat Jafarov (AZE)	9

Quarterfinals
Murat Fırat (TUR)	5
Sebastian Nađ (SRB)	1
Mateusz Bernatek (POL)	2
Hasrat Jafarov (AZE)	5

Semifinals
Murat Fırat (TUR)	2
Hasrat Jafarov (AZE)	0

=== Repechage ===
Repechage round 1
Pedro Caldas (POR)	0
Donior Islamov (MDA)	10

Repechage round 2
Donior Islamov (MDA)	0
Ramaz Zoidze (GEO)	8
~~Zelimkhan Abakarov (ALB)~~
Sebastian Nađ (SRB)	WO

Bronze medal match
Ramaz Zoidze (GEO)	3
Slavik Galstyan (ARM)	6^{F}
Sebastian Nađ (SRB)	1
Hasrat Jafarov (AZE)	8

== Final standing ==
Rank	Wrestler	UWW Points
1st place, gold medalist(s)	Murat Fırat (TUR)	15000
2nd place, silver medalist(s)	István Váncza (HUN)	13000
3rd place, bronze medalist(s)	Hasrat Jafarov (AZE)	11500
3rd place, bronze medalist(s)	Slavik Galstyan (ARM)	11500
5	Ramaz Zoidze (GEO)	10000
5	Sebastian Nađ (SRB)	10000
7	Mateusz Bernatek (POL)	9400
8	Donior Islamov (MDA)	9000
9	Morten Thoresen (NOR)	8500
10	Witalis Lazovski (GER)	8100
11	Mihai Mihuț (ROU)	6000
12	Dmytro Miroshnyk (UKR)	5800
13	Stefan Clément (FRA)	5600
14	Andreas Vetsch (SUI)	5400
15	Ivo Iliev (BUL)	5200
16	Christoph Burger (AUT)	5100
17	Pedro Caldas (POR)	0
18	Zelimkhan Abakarov (ALB)	0
