= Morten Thoresen =

Norwegian Greco-Roman wrestler

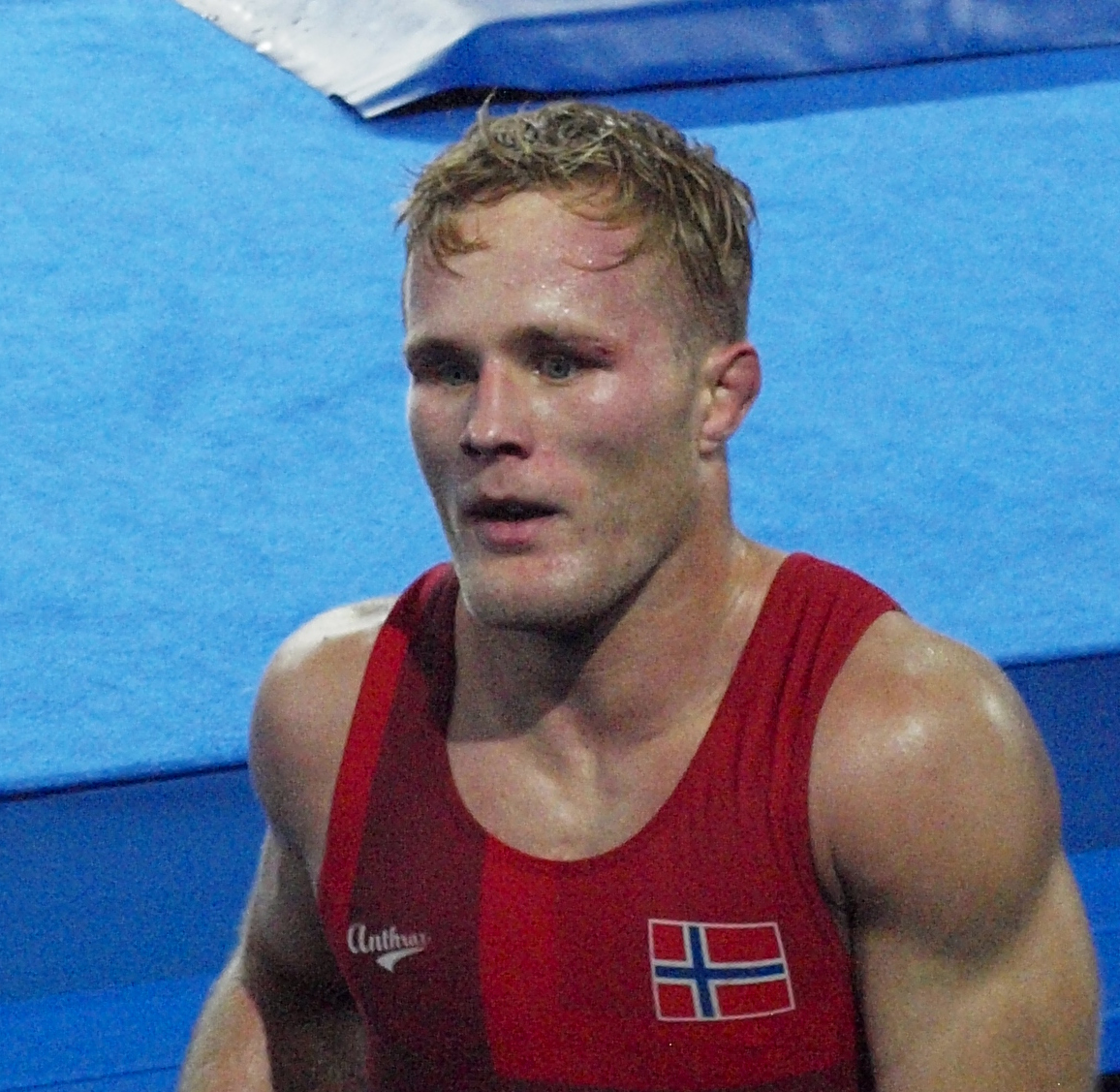
- Thoresen at the 2021 World Wrestling Championships in Oslo, Norway

Personal information
- Born: 2 January 1997 (age 29) Bodø, Norway
- Height: 1.70 m (5 ft 7 in)

Sport
- Country: Norway
- Sport: Amateur wrestling
- Weight class: 67 kg
- Event: Greco-Roman
- Club: Bodø BK
Medal record
Men's Greco-Roman wrestling
Representing Norway
European Championships
Gold medal – first place	2020 Rome	67 kg
Vehbi Emre & Hamit Kaplan Tournament
Silver medal – second place	2022 Istanbul	67 kg
Grand Prix
Gold medal – first place	2023 Warsaw	67 kg
Silver medal – second place	2021 Zagreb	67 kg
Silver medal – second place	2022 Zagreb	67 kg
Bronze medal – third place	2026 Tirana	63 kg
European U23 Championship
Bronze medal – third place	2018 Istanbul	67 kg

Morten Thoresen (born 2 January 1997) is a Norwegian Greco-Roman wrestler. He is a European champion and won the gold medal in the men's Greco-Roman 67 kg event at the 2020 European Championships. He is also a European U23 Championships bronze medallist. Thoresen hails from Bodø Municipality.

== Career ==
In 2018, Thoresen won one of the bronze medals in the men's 67 kg event at the European U23 Wrestling Championship held in Istanbul, Turkey. A month earlier, he competed in the 67 kg event at the European Wrestling Championships without winning a medal. He was eliminated in his second match by Fredrik Bjerrehuus of Denmark. In 2019, Thoresen competed in the 67 kg event at the World Wrestling Championships held in Nur-Sultan, Kazakhstan without winning a medal. He was eliminated in his second match by Frank Stäbler of Germany.

In January 2021, Thoresen won the silver medal in the 67 kg event at the Grand Prix Zagreb Open held in Zagreb, Croatia. In March 2021, he competed at the European Qualification Tournament in Budapest, Hungary hoping to qualify for the 2020 Summer Olympics in Tokyo, Japan. Thoresen did not qualify at this tournament and he also failed to qualify for the Olympics at the World Olympic Qualification Tournament held in Sofia, Bulgaria. In October 2021, Thoresen competed in the 67 kg event at the World Wrestling Championships held in Oslo, Norway. He was eliminated in his third match by eventual bronze medalist Almat Kebispayev of Kazakhstan.

In 2022, Thoresen won the silver medal in his event at the Vehbi Emre & Hamit Kaplan Tournament held in Istanbul, Turkey. He competed in the 67 kg event at the European Wrestling Championships in Budapest, Hungary where he was eliminated in his second match. A few months later, he competed at the Matteo Pellicone Ranking Series 2022 held in Rome, Italy. He competed in the 67 kg event at the 2022 World Wrestling Championships held in Belgrade, Serbia.

Thoresen competed at the 2024 European Wrestling Olympic Qualification Tournament in Baku, Azerbaijan hoping to qualify for the 2024 Summer Olympics in Paris, France. He was eliminated in his third match and he did not qualify for the Olympics.

== Achievements ==
Year	Tournament	Venue	Result	Event
2020	European Championships	Rome, Italy	1st	Greco-Roman 67 kg
