= Islambek Dadov =

Azerbaijani Greco-Roman wrestler

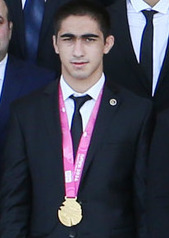

Personal information
- Born: 20 January 1997 (age 29)

Sport
- Country: Azerbaijan
- Sport: Amateur wrestling
- Event: Greco-Roman
Medal record
Men's Greco-Roman wrestling
Representing Azerbaijan
Individual World Cup
Silver medal – second place	2020 Belgrade	67 kg
Summer Youth Olympics
Gold medal – first place	2014 Nanjing	69 kg

Islambek Dadov (born 20 January 1997) is an Azerbaijani Greco-Roman wrestler.

He won the gold medal in the boys' 69 kg event at the 2014 Summer Youth Olympics held in Nanjing, China.

In 2020, he won the silver medal in the 67 kg event at the Individual Wrestling World Cup held in Belgrade, Serbia. In March 2021, he competed at the European Qualification Tournament in Budapest, Hungary hoping to qualify for the 2020 Summer Olympics in Tokyo, Japan. He was eliminated in his third match by Slavik Galstyan of Armenia.
