= István Váncza =

Hungarian Greco-Roman wrestler

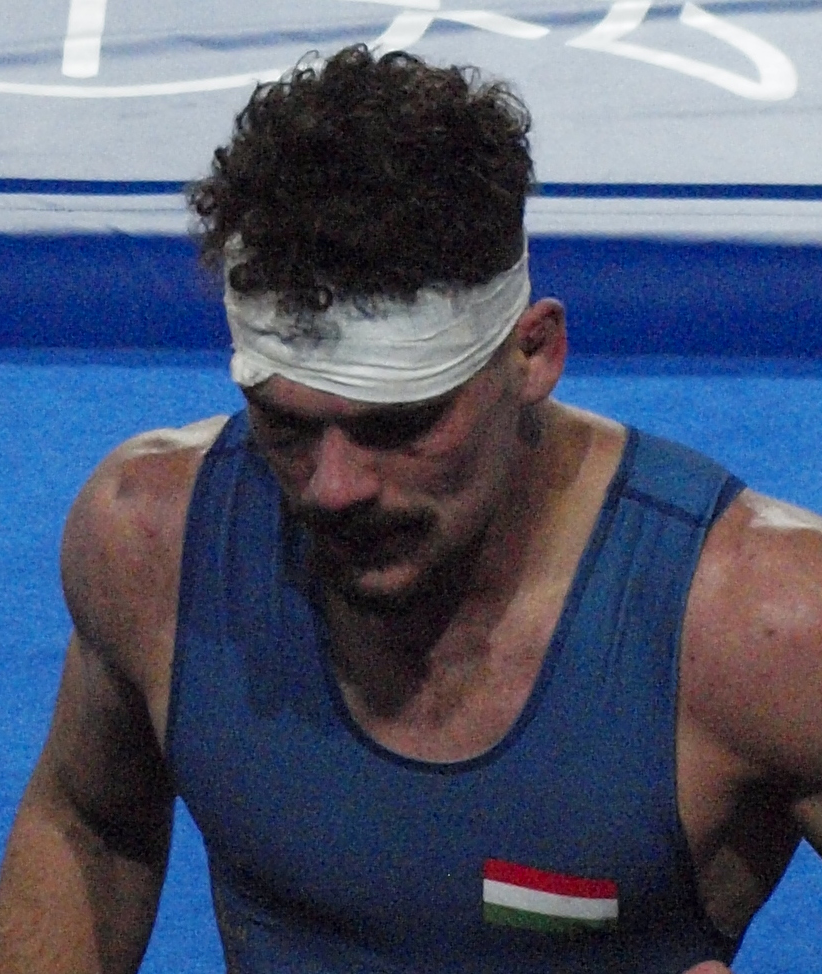

Personal information
- Full name: Krisztian István Váncza
- Born: 28 April 1999 (age 27) Budapest, Hungary
- Height: 1.72 m (5 ft 8 in)
- Weight: 72 kg (159 lb; 11.3 st)

Sport
- Country: Hungary
- Sport: Greco-Roman
- Event: 72 kg
Medal record
Men's Greco-Roman wrestling
Representing Hungary
World Championships
Silver medal – second place	2026 Astana	72 kg
European Championships
Silver medal – second place	2022 Budapest	67 kg
Vehbi Emre & Hamit Kaplan Tournament
Silver medal – second place	2025 Kocaeli	72 kg
Grand Prix
Bronze medal – third place	2024 Budapest	72 kg
Bronze medal – third place	2025 Zagreb	72 kg
European U23 Championship
Gold medal – first place	2021 Skopje	67 kg
World Juniors Championships
Bronze medal – third place	2018 Trnava	63 kg
European Juniors Championships
Bronze medal – third place	2018 Rome	63 kg

István Váncza (born 28 April 1999) is a Hungarian Greco-Roman wrestler competing in the 72 kg division.

== Career ==
He won the silver medal at the 2022 European Wrestling Championships in Budapest, Hungary, losing 3–1 to Turkish Murat Fırat in the final match of 67 kg in the Greco-Roman style.

He competed at the 2024 European Wrestling Olympic Qualification Tournament in Baku, Azerbaijan hoping to qualify for the 2024 Summer Olympics in Paris, France. He was eliminated in his third match and he did not qualify for the Olympics. He also competed at the 2024 World Wrestling Olympic Qualification Tournament held in Istanbul, Turkey without qualifying for the Olympics.

== Achievements ==
Year	Tournament	Location	Result	Event
2022	European Championships	Budapest, Hungary	2nd	Greco-Roman 67 kg
