= 2024 U23 World Wrestling Championships =

- Host city: Tirana, Albania
- Dates: 21-27 October
- Stadium: Tirana Olympic Park

Champions
- Freestyle: Iran
- Greco-Roman: Iran
- Women: United States

The 2024 U23 World Wrestling Championships was the seventh edition of the U23 World Wrestling Championships of combined events and was held from 21 to 27 October 2024 in Tirana, Albania.

== Competition schedule ==
All times are (UTC+2:00)

Date	Time	Event
21 October	10.30-15.00	Qualification rounds: GR – 60-67-72-82-97 kg
21 October	18:00-19.30	Semi-finals: GR – 60-67-72-82-97 kg
22 October	10.30-15.30	Qualification rounds: GR 55-63-77-87-130 kg; Repechage: 60-67-72-82-97 kg
22 October	16.45-17.45	Semi-finals: GR – 55-63-77-87-130 kg
22 October	18.00-20.30	Finals: GR – 60-67-72-82-97 kg
23 October	10.30-13.30	Qualification rounds: WW 50-55-59-68-76 kg; Repechage: GR 55-63-77-87-130 kg
23 October	16.45-17.45	Semi-finals: WW 50-55-59-68-76 kg
23 October	18.00-21.00	Finals: GR 55-63-77-87-130 kg
24 October	10.30-13.30	Qualification rounds: WW 53-57-62-65-72 kg; Repechage: WW 50-55-59-68-76 kg
24 October	16.45-17.45	Semi-finals: WW – 53-57-62-65-72 kg
24 October	18.00-20.30	Finals:WW 50-55-59-68-76 kg
25 October	10.30-15.30	Qualification rounds: FS 61-74-86-92-125 kg; Repechage: WW 53-57-62-65-72 kg
25 October	16.45-17.45	Semi-finals: FS 61-74-86-92-125 kg
25 October	18.00-20.30	Finals: WW 53-57-62-65-72 kg
26 October	10.30-15.30	Qualification rounds: FS 57-65-70-79-97 kg; Repechage: FS 61-74-86-92-125 kg
26 October	16.45-17.45	Semi-finals: FS 57-65-70-79-97 kg
26 October	18.00-21.00	Finals: FS 61-74-86-92-125 kg
27 October	16.00-17.45	Repechage: FS 57-65-70-79-97 kg
27 October	18:00-20.30	Finals: FS 57-65-70-79-97 kg

== Medal table ==
* Host nation (Albania)

Rank	Nation	Gold	Silver	Bronze	Total
1	Iran	6	1	7	14
–	Authorised Neutral Athletes	5	5	11	21
2	Japan	3	3	7	13
3	United States	3	3	2	8
4	Moldova	3	0	2	5
5	Ukraine	2	0	5	7
6	Azerbaijan	1	4	3	8
7	Kyrgyzstan	1	2	2	5
8	India	1	1	7	9
9	Georgia	1	1	4	6
10	Armenia	1	1	0	2
11	Kazakhstan	1	0	0	1
11	Sweden	1	0	0	1
11	Uzbekistan	1	0	0	1
14	China	0	2	1	3
15	Canada	0	2	0	2
16	Germany	0	1	2	3
17	Bulgaria	0	1	0	1
17	Mexico	0	1	0	1
17	Netherlands	0	1	0	1
17	Turkey	0	1	0	1
21	Poland	0	0	3	3
22	Hungary	0	0	1	1
22	Mongolia	0	0	1	1
22	Nigeria	0	0	1	1
22	Romania	0	0	1	1
Totals (25 entries)		30	30	60	120

== Team ranking ==
Rank	Men's freestyle		Men's Greco-Roman		Women's freestyle	
Rank	Team	Points	Team	Points	Team	Points
1	Iran	158	Iran	149	United States	136
2	Japan	102	Georgia	121	Japan	129
3	Azerbaijan	100	Armenia	93	Ukraine	124
4	India	82	Azerbaijan	72	China	95
5	United States	73	Moldova	52	India	84
6	Kyrgyzstan	59	Kyrgyzstan	50	Canada	54
7	Ukraine	47	Poland	50	Turkey	42
8	Kazakhstan	43	Uzbekistan	45	Mongolia	39
9	Moldova	38	Germany	45	Kazakhstan	30
10	Armenia	34	United States	40	Azerbaijan	29

== Medal summary ==
=== Men's freestyle ===
Event	Gold	Silver	Bronze
57 kg	Chirag Chikkara; India	Abdymalik Karachov; Kyrgyzstan	Iunus Iavbatirov; Authorised Neutral Athletes
57 kg	Chirag Chikkara; India	Abdymalik Karachov; Kyrgyzstan	Ali Momeni; Iran
61 kg	Bashir Magomedov; Authorised Neutral Athletes	Ruslan Abdullayev; Azerbaijan	Ebrahim Khari; Iran
61 kg	Bashir Magomedov; Authorised Neutral Athletes	Ruslan Abdullayev; Azerbaijan	Abhishek Dhaka; India
65 kg	Ibragim Ibragimov; Authorised Neutral Athletes	Kaiji Ogino; Japan	Abbas Ebrahimzadeh; Iran
65 kg	Ibragim Ibragimov; Authorised Neutral Athletes	Kaiji Ogino; Japan	Bilol Sharip Uulu; Kyrgyzstan
70 kg	Magomed Khaniev; Azerbaijan	Magomed-Emi Eltemirov; Authorised Neutral Athletes	Sujeet Kalkal; India
70 kg	Magomed Khaniev; Azerbaijan	Magomed-Emi Eltemirov; Authorised Neutral Athletes	Yoshinosuke Aoyagi; Japan
74 kg	Kota Takahashi; Japan	Orozobek Toktomambetov; Kyrgyzstan	Dzhabrail Gadzhiev; Azerbaijan
74 kg	Kota Takahashi; Japan	Orozobek Toktomambetov; Kyrgyzstan	Mitchell Mesenbrink; United States
79 kg	Mehdi Yousefi; Iran	Lu Feng; China	Masaki Sato; Japan
79 kg	Mehdi Yousefi; Iran	Lu Feng; China	Arsen Balaian; Authorised Neutral Athletes
86 kg	Arslan Bagaev; Authorised Neutral Athletes	Arsenii Dzhioev; Azerbaijan	Eugeniu Mihalcean; Moldova
86 kg	Arslan Bagaev; Authorised Neutral Athletes	Arsenii Dzhioev; Azerbaijan	Yudai Takahashi; Japan
92 kg	Amir Hossein Firouzpour; Iran	Jacob Cardenas; United States	Mustafagadzhi Malachdibirov; Authorised Neutral Athletes
92 kg	Amir Hossein Firouzpour; Iran	Jacob Cardenas; United States	Ion Demian; Moldova
97 kg	Rizabek Aitmukhan; Kazakhstan	Mehdi Hajiloueian; Iran	Vicky Hooda; India
97 kg	Rizabek Aitmukhan; Kazakhstan	Mehdi Hajiloueian; Iran	Uladzislau Kazlou; Authorised Neutral Athletes
125 kg	Amir Reza Masoumi; Iran	Alen Khubulov; Bulgaria	Abdulla Kurbanov; Authorised Neutral Athletes
125 kg	Amir Reza Masoumi; Iran	Alen Khubulov; Bulgaria	Volodymyr Kochanov; Ukraine

=== Men's Greco-Roman ===
Event	Gold	Silver	Bronze
55 kg	Ali Ahmadi Vafa; Iran	Rashad Mammadov; Azerbaijan	Kohei Yamagiwa; Japan
55 kg	Ali Ahmadi Vafa; Iran	Rashad Mammadov; Azerbaijan	Vishvajit More; India
60 kg	Alisher Ganiev; Uzbekistan	Dinislam Bammatov; Authorised Neutral Athletes	Nihad Guluzade; Azerbaijan
60 kg	Alisher Ganiev; Uzbekistan	Dinislam Bammatov; Authorised Neutral Athletes	Pridon Abuladze; Georgia
63 kg	Vitalie Eriomenco; Moldova	Komei Sawada; Japan	Mairbek Salimov; Poland
63 kg	Vitalie Eriomenco; Moldova	Komei Sawada; Japan	Erfan Jarkani; Iran
67 kg	Razzak Beishekeev; Kyrgyzstan	Diego Chkhikvadze; Georgia	Arslanbek Salimov; Poland
67 kg	Razzak Beishekeev; Kyrgyzstan	Diego Chkhikvadze; Georgia	Daniial Agaev; Authorised Neutral Athletes
72 kg	Giorgi Chkhikvadze; Georgia	Shant Khachatryan; Armenia	Danial Sohrabi; Iran
72 kg	Giorgi Chkhikvadze; Georgia	Shant Khachatryan; Armenia	Imran Aliev; Authorised Neutral Athletes
77 kg	Alexandrin Guțu; Moldova	Samuel Bellscheidt; Germany	Ali Oskou; Iran
77 kg	Alexandrin Guțu; Moldova	Samuel Bellscheidt; Germany	Khasay Hasanli; Azerbaijan
82 kg	Mohammad Naghousi; Iran	Beka Melelashvili; United States	Deni Nakaev; Germany
82 kg	Mohammad Naghousi; Iran	Beka Melelashvili; United States	Data Chkhaidze; Georgia
87 kg	Aues Gonibov; Authorised Neutral Athletes	Marcel Sterkenburg; Netherlands	Achiko Bolkvadze; Georgia
87 kg	Aues Gonibov; Authorised Neutral Athletes	Marcel Sterkenburg; Netherlands	Asan Zhanyshov; Kyrgyzstan
97 kg	Hayk Khloyan; Armenia	Abubakar Khaslakhanau; Authorised Neutral Athletes	Magomed Murtazaliev; Authorised Neutral Athletes
97 kg	Hayk Khloyan; Armenia	Abubakar Khaslakhanau; Authorised Neutral Athletes	Shayan Habib Zare; Iran
130 kg	Fardin Hedayati; Iran	Dmitrii Baboryko; Authorised Neutral Athletes	Koppány László; Hungary
130 kg	Fardin Hedayati; Iran	Dmitrii Baboryko; Authorised Neutral Athletes	Giorgi Tsopurashvili; Georgia

=== Women's freestyle ===
Event	Gold	Silver	Bronze
50 kg	Sage Mortimer; United States	Natalia Pudova; Authorised Neutral Athletes	Umi Ito; Japan
50 kg	Sage Mortimer; United States	Natalia Pudova; Authorised Neutral Athletes	Natalia Klivchutska; Ukraine
53 kg	Yu Sakamoto; Japan	Serena Di Benedetto; Canada	Chinboldyn Otgontuyaa; Mongolia
53 kg	Yu Sakamoto; Japan	Serena Di Benedetto; Canada	Anastasia Blayvas; Germany
55 kg	Jonna Malmgren; Sweden	Zeltzin Hernández; Mexico	Oleksandra Khomenets; Ukraine
55 kg	Jonna Malmgren; Sweden	Zeltzin Hernández; Mexico	Amani Jones; United States
57 kg	Zhala Aliyeva; Azerbaijan	Ruka Natami; Japan	Neha Sharma; India
57 kg	Zhala Aliyeva; Azerbaijan	Ruka Natami; Japan	Alina Filipovych; Ukraine
59 kg	Solomiia Vynnyk; Ukraine	Anjali Gahlawat; India	Himeka Tokuhara; Japan
59 kg	Solomiia Vynnyk; Ukraine	Anjali Gahlawat; India	Hong Liang; China
62 kg	Iryna Bondar; Ukraine	Macey Kilty; United States	Esther Kolawole; Nigeria
62 kg	Iryna Bondar; Ukraine	Macey Kilty; United States	Olha Padoshyk; Poland
65 kg	Irina Rîngaci; Moldova	Alina Kasabieva; Authorised Neutral Athletes	Shiksha Kharb; India
65 kg	Irina Rîngaci; Moldova	Alina Kasabieva; Authorised Neutral Athletes	Kateryna Zelenykh; Romania
68 kg	Ami Ishii; Japan	Nesrin Baş; Turkey	Monika Sheoran; India
68 kg	Ami Ishii; Japan	Nesrin Baş; Turkey	Alina Shauchuk; Authorised Neutral Athletes
72 kg	Kylie Welker; United States	Vianne Rouleau; Canada	Anastasiya Alpyeyeva; Ukraine
72 kg	Kylie Welker; United States	Vianne Rouleau; Canada	Viktoryia Radzkova; Authorised Neutral Athletes
76 kg	Yelena Makoyed; United States	Cheng Shuiyan; China	Nodoka Yamamoto; Japan
76 kg	Yelena Makoyed; United States	Cheng Shuiyan; China	Valeriia Trifonova; Authorised Neutral Athletes

== Participating nations ==
640 wrestlers from 66 countries:

1. Albania (11) (Host)
2. Algeria (1)
3. Armenia (20)
4. Australia (1)
5. Azerbaijan (25)
6. Bahamas (1)
7. Belgium (3)
8. Brazil (1)
9. Bahrain (2)
10. Bulgaria (7)
11. Canada (17)
12. Chile (4)
13. China (30)
14. Colombia (10)
15. Croatia (5)
16. Czech Republic (2)
17. Denmark (3)
18. Egypt (4)
19. Spain (3)
20. Estonia (7)
21. Finland (3)
22. France (8)
23. Georgia (20)
24. Germany (11)
25. Ghana (1)
26. Greece (6)
27. Guatemala (2)
28. Hong Kong (4)
29. Hungary (11)
30. India (29)
31. Iran (20)
32. Israel (2)
33. Italy (9)
34. Japan (30)
35. Kazakhstan (30)
36. Kyrgyzstan (21)
37. Kosovo (1)
38. Saudi Arabia (3)
39. Latvia (1)
40. Lithuania (5)
41. Morocco (3)
42. Moldova (18)
43. Mexico (3)
44. Mongolia (12)
45. North Macedonia (1)
46. Netherlands (3)
47. Nigeria (1)
48. Norway (4)
49. Panama (2)
50. Poland (20)
51. Puerto Rico (7)
52. Romania (8)
53. South Africa (1)
54. Singapore (1)
55. Serbia (5)
56. Switzerland (4)
57. Slovakia (3)
58. Sweden (7)
59. Syria (1)
60. Tajikistan (1)
61. Chinese Taipei (2)
62. Turkey (30)
63. Ukraine (30)
64. United States (30)
65. Uzbekistan (5)
66. Venezuela (6)
67. Individual Neutral Athletes (58)
