= 2025 U23 World Wrestling Championships – Men's Greco-Roman 67 kg =

Wrestling competitions

Men's Greco-Roman 67 kg at the 2025 U23 World Championships
- Venue: SPC Vojvodina
- Dates: 21–22 October
- Competitors: 33 from 31 nations

Medalists
gold medal	Mohamed Abdelrehim	Egypt
silver medal	Anri Khozrevanidze	Georgia
bronze medal	Ahmad Reza Mohsennejad	Iran
bronze medal	Otto Black	United States

The men's Greco-Roman 67 kilograms is a competition featured at the 2025 U23 World Wrestling Championships, and was held in Novi Sad, Serbia on 21 and 22 October 2025.

This Greco-Roman wrestling competition consists of a single-elimination tournament, with a repechage used to determine the winner of two bronze medals. The two finalists face off for gold and silver medals. Each wrestler who loses to one of the two finalists moves into the repechage, culminating in a pair of bronze medal matches featuring the semifinal losers each facing the remaining repechage opponent from their half of the bracket.

== Results ==
Legend

- F — Won by fall
- R — Retired
- WO — Won by walkover

=== Finals ===
Semifinals		Final
Hleb Makaranka (UWW)	1
Anri Khozrevanidze (GEO)	1	Anri Khozrevanidze (GEO)	0
Mohamed Abdelrehim (EGY)	4	Mohamed Abdelrehim (EGY)	3
Attila Józsa (HUN)	0^{R}

=== Top half ===
==== Section 1 ====
Round of 64
Ruben Miranyan (ARM)	8
Imed Khudzhadze (UKR)	5

Round of 32
Shon Nadorgin (ISR)	0
Baiaman Karimov (KGZ)	8
Nishant (IND)	3
Faraim Mustafayev (AZE)	8
Ruben Miranyan (ARM)	9
Oussama Nasr (TUN)	0
Daniial Agaev (UWW)	1
Hleb Makaranka (UWW)	5

Round of 16
Baiaman Karimov (KGZ)	1
Faraim Mustafayev (AZE)	4
Ruben Miranyan (ARM)	1
Hleb Makaranka (UWW)	2

Quarterfinals
Faraim Mustafayev (AZE)	3
Hleb Makaranka (UWW)	4

==== Section 2 ====
Round of 32

Round of 16
Dejan Berkec (SRB)	0
Andrea Setti (ITA)	8^{F}
Yonat Véliz (CUB)	2
Anri Khozrevanidze (GEO)	2
Brandon Álvarez (MEX)	0
Azat Sarıyar (TUR)	9
Ardit Zeneli (ALB)	0
Ahmad Reza Mohsennejad (IRI)	8

Quarterfinals
Andrea Setti (ITA)	5
Anri Khozrevanidze (GEO)	6
Azat Sarıyar (TUR)	1
Ahmad Reza Mohsennejad (IRI)	7

Semifinals
Anri Khozrevanidze (GEO)	5
Ahmad Reza Mohsennejad (IRI)	4

=== Bottom half ===
==== Section 3 ====
Round of 32

Round of 16
William Reenberg (DEN)	1
Mohamed Abdelrehim (EGY)	1
Néstor Almanza (CHI)	7
Bagdat Sabaz (KAZ)	8
Otto Black (USA)	7
Adomas Grigaliūnas (LTU)	3
Yanis Nifri (FRA)	9
Adrian Anton (ROU)	1

Quarterfinals
Mohamed Abdelrehim (EGY)	3
Bagdat Sabaz (KAZ)	3
Otto Black (USA)	6^{F}
Yanis Nifri (FRA)	1

Semifinals
Mohamed Abdelrehim (EGY)	1
Otto Black (USA)	1

==== Section 4 ====
Round of 32

Round of 16
Alexandr Gurali (MDA)	0
Chiezo Maruyama (JPN)	9
Arslanbek Salimov (POL)	0
Oybek Sharibjonov (UZB)	8
Attila Józsa (HUN)	9
Yong Hanqing (CHN)	4
Dimitar Georgiev (BUL)	7
Nestori Mannila (FIN)	6

Quarterfinals
Chiezo Maruyama (JPN)	1
Oybek Sharibjonov (UZB)	5
Attila Józsa (HUN)	8
Dimitar Georgiev (BUL)	0

Semifinals
Oybek Sharibjonov (UZB)	2
Attila Józsa (HUN)	8

=== Repechage ===
Repechage round 2
Yonat Véliz (CUB)	9
Andrea Setti (ITA)	0
William Reenberg (DEN)	2
Bagdat Sabaz (KAZ)	4

Repechage round 3
Yonat Véliz (CUB)	1
Ahmad Reza Mohsennejad (IRI)	5
Bagdat Sabaz (KAZ)	6
Otto Black (USA)	8

Bronze medals
Ahmad Reza Mohsennejad (IRI)	7
Hleb Makaranka (UWW)	1
Otto Black (USA)	WO
Attila Józsa (HUN)

== Final standing ==
Rank	Athlete
1st place, gold medalist(s)	Mohamed Abdelrehim (EGY)
2nd place, silver medalist(s)	Anri Khozrevanidze (GEO)
3rd place, bronze medalist(s)	Ahmad Reza Mohsennejad (IRI)
3rd place, bronze medalist(s)	Otto Black (USA)
5	Hleb Makaranka (UWW)
5	Attila Józsa (HUN)
7	Ruben Miranyan (ARM)
8	Oybek Sharibjonov (UZB)
9	Bagdat Sabaz (KAZ)
10	Faraim Mustafayev (AZE)
11	Andrea Setti (ITA)
12	Yonat Véliz (CUB)
13	Chiezo Maruyama (JPN)
14	Azat Sarıyar (TUR)
15	Baiaman Karimov (KGZ)
16	Yanis Nifri (FRA)
17	Dimitar Georgiev (BUL)
18	William Reenberg (DEN)
19	Néstor Almanza (CHI)
20	Nestori Mannila (FIN)
21	Imed Khudzhadze (UKR)
22	Yong Hanqing (CHN)
23	Adomas Grigaliūnas (LTU)
24	Nishant (IND)
25	Daniial Agaev (UWW)
26	Adrian Anton (ROU)
27	Shon Nadorgin (ISR)
28	Dejan Berkec (SRB)
29	Ardit Zeneli (ALB)
30	Arslanbek Salimov (POL)
31	Oussama Nasr (TUN)
32	Brandon Álvarez (MEX)
33	Alexandr Gurali (MDA)
