= 2018 Asian Wrestling Championships – Results =

These are the results of the 2018 Asian Wrestling Championships which took place between 27 February and 4 March 2018 in Bishkek, Kyrgyzstan.

== Men's freestyle ==
=== 57 kg ===
3 March

Round of 16
Kang Kum-song (PRK)	7
Meretmuhammet Ataýew (TKM)	2
Aws Wisam (IRQ)	0
Song Hyeon-sik (KOR)	10
Zhandos Ismailov (KAZ)	12
Liu Minghu (CHN)	3
Lin Yuan-jie (TPE)	0
Makhmudjon Shavkatov (UZB)	10
Nader Hajiaghania (IRI)	8
Rahul Aware (IND)	4
Almaz Smanbekov (KGZ)	2
Tseveensürengiin Tsogbadrakh (MGL)	12

Quarterfinals
Toshihiro Hasegawa (JPN)	5^{C}
Hikmatullo Vohidov (TJK)	0
Kang Kum-song (PRK)	4^{F}
Song Hyeon-sik (KOR)	0
Zhandos Ismailov (KAZ)	5
Makhmudjon Shavkatov (UZB)	7
Nader Hajiaghania (IRI)	14
Tseveensürengiin Tsogbadrakh (MGL)	13

Semifinals
Toshihiro Hasegawa (JPN)	0
Kang Kum-song (PRK)	8
Makhmudjon Shavkatov (UZB)	10
Nader Hajiaghania (IRI)	9

Final
Kang Kum-song (PRK)	4
Makhmudjon Shavkatov (UZB)	2

Repechage round 1
Meretmuhammet Ataýew (TKM)	1
Song Hyeon-sik (KOR)	12
Lin Yuan-jie (TPE)	0
Zhandos Ismailov (KAZ)	10

Bronze medals
Song Hyeon-sik (KOR)	0
Toshihiro Hasegawa (JPN)	10
Zhandos Ismailov (KAZ)	10
Nader Hajiaghania (IRI)	3

=== 61 kg ===
4 March

Round of 16
Nurislam Sanayev (KAZ)	9
Tsermaagiin Chinzorig (MGL)	0
Mohammed Al-Jawad (IRQ)	0
Ulukbek Zholdoshbekov (KGZ)	10
Iman Sadeghi (IRI)	8
Gerçek Hemraýew (TKM)	0
Yun Ji-hoon (KOR)	0
Liang Shaofeng (CHN)	7

Quarterfinals
Abbos Rakhmonov (UZB)	8
Dzhamshed Sharifov (TJK)	0
Sharvan Tomar (IND)	0
Kazuya Koyanagi (JPN)	10
Nurislam Sanayev (KAZ)	7
Ulukbek Zholdoshbekov (KGZ)	4
Iman Sadeghi (IRI)	6
Liang Shaofeng (CHN)	3

Semifinals
Abbos Rakhmonov (UZB)	2
Kazuya Koyanagi (JPN)	7
Nurislam Sanayev (KAZ)	5
Iman Sadeghi (IRI)	4

Final
Kazuya Koyanagi (JPN)	2
Nurislam Sanayev (KAZ)	6

Repechage round 1
Tsermaagiin Chinzorig (MGL)	1
Ulukbek Zholdoshbekov (KGZ)	3

Bronze medals
Sharvan Tomar (IND)	6
Abbos Rakhmonov (UZB)	6
Ulukbek Zholdoshbekov (KGZ)	6
Iman Sadeghi (IRI)	0

=== 65 kg ===
3 March

Round of 16
Saparmyrat Myradow (TKM)	5
Bajrang Punia (IND)	16^{F}
Abdulqosim Fayziev (TJK)	0
Daichi Takatani (JPN)	9
Chang Yu-hsuan (TPE)	0
Ernazar Akmataliev (KGZ)	12
Kim Kuk-gwang (PRK)	4
Daulet Niyazbekov (KAZ)	7^{F}
Lee Seung-chul (KOR)	14
Haji Mohamad Ali (BRN)	16^{F}
Hasibagena (CHN)	0
Temurjon Usmonohunov (UZB)	12

Quarterfinals
Enkhsaikhany Nyam-Ochir (MGL)	3
Younes Emami (IRI)	8
Bajrang Punia (IND)	5
Daichi Takatani (JPN)	7
Ernazar Akmataliev (KGZ)	3
Daulet Niyazbekov (KAZ)	6
Haji Mohamad Ali (BRN)	2
Temurjon Usmonohunov (UZB)	2^{F}

Semifinals
Younes Emami (IRI)	4
Daichi Takatani (JPN)	8
Daulet Niyazbekov (KAZ)	10^{F}
Temurjon Usmonohunov (UZB)	0

Final
Daichi Takatani (JPN)	0
Daulet Niyazbekov (KAZ)	11

Repechage round 1
Abdulqosim Fayziev (TJK)	2
Bajrang Punia (IND)	12
Kim Kuk-gwang (PRK)	8
Ernazar Akmataliev (KGZ)	8

Bronze medals
Bajrang Punia (IND)	10
Younes Emami (IRI)	4
Kim Kuk-gwang (PRK)	6
Temurjon Usmonohunov (UZB)	10^{F}

=== 70 kg ===
3 March

Round of 16
Lee Seung-bong (KOR)	8
Bat-Erdeniin Byambadorj (MGL)	5
Ahmad Mohammadi (IRI)	12
Keisuke Otoguro (JPN)	14
Dawood Salman (IRQ)	13
Gulomdzhon Sharipov (TJK)	22
Meirzhan Ashirov (KAZ)	9
Batyr Orazgylyjow (TKM)	6

Quarterfinals
Elaman Dogdurbek Uulu (KGZ)	9
Menghejigan (CHN)	0
Vinod Kumar Omprakash (IND)	3
Ikhtiyor Navruzov (UZB)	6
Lee Seung-bong (KOR)	4
Keisuke Otoguro (JPN)	2
Gulomdzhon Sharipov (TJK)	5
Meirzhan Ashirov (KAZ)	9

Semifinals
Elaman Dogdurbek Uulu (KGZ)	2
Ikhtiyor Navruzov (UZB)	5
Lee Seung-bong (KOR)	4
Meirzhan Ashirov (KAZ)	3

Final
Ikhtiyor Navruzov (UZB)	3
Lee Seung-bong (KOR)	0

Repechage round 1
Bat-Erdeniin Byambadorj (MGL)	WO
Keisuke Otoguro (JPN)

Bronze medals
Vinod Kumar Omprakash (IND)	3
Elaman Dogdurbek Uulu (KGZ)	3
Bat-Erdeniin Byambadorj (MGL)	3
Meirzhan Ashirov (KAZ)	4

=== 74 kg ===
4 March

Round of 16
Wu Wei (CHN)	3
Döwletmyrat Orazgylyjow (TKM)	14
Sorbon Abdulkhaev (TJK)	0
Muslim Evloev (KGZ)	11
Parveen Rana (IND)	0
Mostafa Hosseinkhani (IRI)	5
Bekzod Abdurakhmonov (UZB)	11
Wang Ming-liang (TPE)	0

Quarterfinals
Ganzorigiin Mandakhnaran (MGL)	5
Kim Dai-sung (KOR)	4
Ken Hosaka (JPN)	1
Daniyar Kaisanov (KAZ)	9
Döwletmyrat Orazgylyjow (TKM)	2
Muslim Evloev (KGZ)	12
Mostafa Hosseinkhani (IRI)	3
Bekzod Abdurakhmonov (UZB)	2

Semifinals
Ganzorigiin Mandakhnaran (MGL)	8
Daniyar Kaisanov (KAZ)	6
Muslim Evloev (KGZ)	8
Mostafa Hosseinkhani (IRI)	4

Final
Ganzorigiin Mandakhnaran (MGL)	1
Muslim Evloev (KGZ)	11

Repechage round 1
Sorbon Abdulkhaev (TJK)	2
Döwletmyrat Orazgylyjow (TKM)	12

Bronze medals
Kim Dai-sung (KOR)	8
Daniyar Kaisanov (KAZ)	12
Döwletmyrat Orazgylyjow (TKM)	0
Mostafa Hosseinkhani (IRI)	10

=== 79 kg ===
3 March

Round of 16
Zhang Chongyao (CHN)	1
Tsubasa Asai (JPN)	6
Galymzhan Usserbayev (KAZ)	8
Jitender Kumar (IND)	1
Şähergeldi Saparmyradow (TKM)	4
Atai Izabekov (KGZ)	1
Rashid Kurbanov (UZB)	10
Lee Yun-seok (KOR)	0

Quarterfinals
Ganboldyn Törbold (MGL)	9
Qosim Usmoni (TJK)	0
Adam Batirov (BRN)
Ezzatollah Akbari (IRI)	WO
Tsubasa Asai (JPN)	8
Galymzhan Usserbayev (KAZ)	0
Şähergeldi Saparmyradow (TKM)	0
Rashid Kurbanov (UZB)	11^{F}

Semifinals
Ganboldyn Törbold (MGL)	0
Ezzatollah Akbari (IRI)	10
Tsubasa Asai (JPN)	1
Rashid Kurbanov (UZB)	3

Final
Ezzatollah Akbari (IRI)	5
Rashid Kurbanov (UZB)	0^{R}

Repechage round 1
Lee Yun-seok (KOR)	14
Şähergeldi Saparmyradow (TKM)	3

Bronze medals
Adam Batirov (BRN)
Ganboldyn Törbold (MGL)	WO
Lee Yun-seok (KOR)	1
Tsubasa Asai (JPN)	7

=== 86 kg ===
4 March

Round of 16
Bakhodur Kadirov (TJK)	8
Bi Shengfeng (CHN)	10
Dinislambek Taalaibek Uulu (KGZ)	1
Gwon Hyeok-beom (KOR)	11
Orgodolyn Üitümen (MGL)	10
Shota Shirai (JPN)	3
Deepak Punia (IND)	WO
~~Wisam Shakir (IRQ)~~

Quarterfinals
Hassan Yazdani (IRI)	12
Azamat Dauletbekov (KAZ)	2
Javrail Shapiev (UZB)	11
Arslan Hudaýberdiýew (TKM)	0
Bi Shengfeng (CHN)	12
Gwon Hyeok-beom (KOR)	1
Orgodolyn Üitümen (MGL)	7
Deepak Punia (IND)	0

Semifinals
Hassan Yazdani (IRI)	13
Javrail Shapiev (UZB)	0
Bi Shengfeng (CHN)	1
Orgodolyn Üitümen (MGL)	12

Final
Hassan Yazdani (IRI)	10
Orgodolyn Üitümen (MGL)	0

Repechage round 1
Shota Shirai (JPN)	2
Deepak Punia (IND)	7^{C}

Bronze medals
Azamat Dauletbekov (KAZ)	4
Javrail Shapiev (UZB)	0
Deepak Punia (IND)	0
Bi Shengfeng (CHN)	10

=== 92 kg ===
4 March

Round of 16
Takashi Ishiguro (JPN)	2
Adilet Davlumbayev (KAZ)	9
Azizbek Soliev (UZB)	11
Safarali Komiljoni (TJK)	0

Quarterfinals
Mohammad Javad Ebrahimi (IRI)	10
Sue Chang-jae (KOR)	0
Lin Zushen (CHN)	10
Somveer Kadian (IND)	0
Baktyiar Karagul Uulu (KGZ)	0
Luvsandorjiin Turtogtokh (MGL)	10
Adilet Davlumbayev (KAZ)	9
Azizbek Soliev (UZB)	2

Semifinals
Mohammad Javad Ebrahimi (IRI)	7
Lin Zushen (CHN)	2
Luvsandorjiin Turtogtokh (MGL)	9
Adilet Davlumbayev (KAZ)	10

Final
Mohammad Javad Ebrahimi (IRI)	5
Adilet Davlumbayev (KAZ)	2

Repechage round 1
Takashi Ishiguro (JPN)	2
Azizbek Soliev (UZB)	15

Bronze medals
Sue Chang-jae (KOR)	1
Lin Zushen (CHN)	2
Azizbek Soliev (UZB)	4
Luvsandorjiin Turtogtokh (MGL)	3

=== 97 kg ===
3 March

Round of 16
Takeshi Yamaguchi (JPN)	5
Yang Chaoqiang (CHN)	3
Zyýamuhammet Saparow (TKM)	2
Magomed Ibragimov (UZB)	13
Rustam Iskandari (TJK)	8
Aibek Usupov (KGZ)	21

Quarterfinals
Mamed Ibragimov (KAZ)	0
Mojtaba Goleij (IRI)	4
Boldbaataryn Odsüren (MGL)	0
Kim Jae-gang (KOR)	6
Mausam Khatri (IND)	0
Takeshi Yamaguchi (JPN)	5
Magomed Ibragimov (UZB)	5
Aibek Usupov (KGZ)	0

Semifinals
Mojtaba Goleij (IRI)	11
Kim Jae-gang (KOR)	0
Takeshi Yamaguchi (JPN)	0
Magomed Ibragimov (UZB)	10

Final
Mojtaba Goleij (IRI)	3
Magomed Ibragimov (UZB)	5

Repechage round 1
Zyýamuhammet Saparow (TKM)	0
Aibek Usupov (KGZ)	11

Bronze medals
Mamed Ibragimov (KAZ)	0
Kim Jae-gang (KOR)	11
Aibek Usupov (KGZ)	3
Takeshi Yamaguchi (JPN)	6

- Aibek Usupov of Kyrgyzstan originally finished fifth, but was disqualified after he refused the doping test.

=== 125 kg ===
4 March

Round of 16
Murat Ramonov (KGZ)	WO
~~Ahmed Salah (IRQ)~~
Deng Zhiwei (CHN)	4
Daulet Shabanbay (KAZ)	3
Nobuyoshi Arakida (JPN)	0
Natsagsürengiin Zolboo (MGL)	4
Sumit Malik (IND)	4
Nam Kyung-jin (KOR)	5
Farkhod Anakulov (TJK)	2
Giorgi Sakandelidze (QAT)	12

Quarterfinals
Söhbet Belliýew (TKM)	0
Davit Modzmanashvili (UZB)	10
Amin Taheri (IRI)	10
Murat Ramonov (KGZ)	0
Deng Zhiwei (CHN)	2
Natsagsürengiin Zolboo (MGL)	3
Nam Kyung-jin (KOR)	5
Giorgi Sakandelidze (QAT)	9

Semifinals
Davit Modzmanashvili (UZB)	3
Amin Taheri (IRI)	0
Natsagsürengiin Zolboo (MGL)	1
Giorgi Sakandelidze (QAT)	2

Final
Davit Modzmanashvili (UZB)	5
Giorgi Sakandelidze (QAT)	0

Repechage round 1
Farkhod Anakulov (TJK)	4
Nam Kyung-jin (KOR)	5

Bronze medals
Söhbet Belliýew (TKM)	4
Amin Taheri (IRI)	14
Nam Kyung-jin (KOR)	0
Natsagsürengiin Zolboo (MGL)	10

== Men's Greco-Roman ==
=== 55 kg ===
27 February

Round of 16
Shota Tanokura (JPN)	8
Khasan Sufiev (TJK)	0
Rajender Kumar (IND)	7
Reza Khedri (IRI)	3

Quarterfinals
Zholaman Sharshenbekov (KGZ)	10
Khorlan Zhakansha (KAZ)	2
Cao Liguo (CHN)	WO
~~Hayder Talib (IRQ)~~
Son Hee-dong (KOR)	0
Javokhir Mirakhmedov (UZB)	8
Shota Tanokura (JPN)	5
Rajender Kumar (IND)	2

Semifinals
Zholaman Sharshenbekov (KGZ)	8
Cao Liguo (CHN)	0
Javokhir Mirakhmedov (UZB)	0
Shota Tanokura (JPN)	6

Final
Zholaman Sharshenbekov (KGZ)	4
Shota Tanokura (JPN)	5

Repechage round 1
Khasan Sufiev (TJK)	2
Rajender Kumar (IND)	11

Bronze medals
Khorlan Zhakansha (KAZ)	7
Cao Liguo (CHN)	4
Rajender Kumar (IND)	3
Javokhir Mirakhmedov (UZB)	3

=== 60 kg ===
28 February

Round of 16
Ri Se-ung (PRK)	10
Lin Yu-hung (TPE)	0
Islomjon Bakhromov (UZB)	8^{F}
Gyanender Dahiya (IND)	0
Kim Seung-hak (KOR)	8
Tuo Erbatu (CHN)	0

Quarterfinals
Aidos Sultangali (KAZ)	2
Shirzad Beheshti (IRI)	2
Kanybek Zholchubekov (KGZ)	1
Shinobu Ota (JPN)	7^{F}
Piyabut Wiratul (THA)	0
Ri Se-ung (PRK)	8
Islomjon Bakhromov (UZB)	10
Kim Seung-hak (KOR)	5

Semifinals
Shirzad Beheshti (IRI)	4
Shinobu Ota (JPN)	5
Ri Se-ung (PRK)	8
Islomjon Bakhromov (UZB)	0

Final
Shinobu Ota (JPN)	11
Ri Se-ung (PRK)	2

Repechage round 1
Lin Yu-hung (TPE)	8
Piyabut Wiratul (THA)	0

Bronze medals
Kanybek Zholchubekov (KGZ)	10^{F}
Shirzad Beheshti (IRI)	3
Lin Yu-hung (TPE)	0
Islomjon Bakhromov (UZB)	8

=== 63 kg ===
27 February

Round of 16
Ibrahim Arrar (JOR)	0
Walihan Sailike (CHN)	8

Quarterfinals
Meirambek Ainagulov (KAZ)	10
Keramat Abdevali (IRI)	0
Elmurat Tasmuradov (UZB)	8
Vikram Kurade (IND)	0
Urmatbek Amatov (KGZ)	1
Jung Do-kyung (KOR)	1
Takayuki Inoguchi (JPN)	6
Walihan Sailike (CHN)	0

Semifinals
Meirambek Ainagulov (KAZ)	8
Elmurat Tasmuradov (UZB)	13
Urmatbek Amatov (KGZ)	8
Takayuki Inoguchi (JPN)	7

Final
Elmurat Tasmuradov (UZB)	8
Urmatbek Amatov (KGZ)	0

Bronze medals
Vikram Kurade (IND)	0
Meirambek Ainagulov (KAZ)	9
Jung Do-kyung (KOR)	2
Takayuki Inoguchi (JPN)	0

=== 67 kg ===
28 February

Round of 16
Ryu Han-su (KOR)	6^{F}
Hung Ying-hua (TPE)	0
Tsuchika Shimoyamada (JPN)	9^{F}
Seýdylla Täzäýew (TKM)	2
Roman Tsarev (KGZ)	8
Mohammad Eliasi (IRI)	6
Zhang Gaoquan (CHN)	8
Pongsit Deemark (THA)	0

Quarterfinals
Almat Kebispayev (KAZ)	6
Mirzobek Rakhmatov (UZB)	2
Azizbeki Sharifzoda (TJK)	8
Manish (IND)	9^{F}
Ryu Han-su (KOR)	1^{R}
Tsuchika Shimoyamada (JPN)	7
Roman Tsarev (KGZ)	0
Zhang Gaoquan (CHN)	2

Semifinals
Almat Kebispayev (KAZ)	10
Manish (IND)	1
Tsuchika Shimoyamada (JPN)	6
Zhang Gaoquan (CHN)	5

Final
Almat Kebispayev (KAZ)	5
Tsuchika Shimoyamada (JPN)	1

Repechage round 1
Seýdylla Täzäýew (TKM)	WO
Ryu Han-su (KOR)

Bronze medals
Mirzobek Rakhmatov (UZB)	6
Manish (IND)	4
Seýdylla Täzäýew (TKM)	0
Zhang Gaoquan (CHN)	6

=== 72 kg ===
28 February

Round of 16
Taha Yaseen (IRQ)	8
Lee Jeong-geun (KOR)	0
Majid Khalili (IRI)	5
Tomohiro Inoue (JPN)	6
Apichai Natal (THA)	1
Kuldeep Malik (IND)	9
Akzhol Makhmudov (KGZ)	12
Ahmad Dahshan (JOR)	2

Quarterfinals
Jiang Yuan (CHN)	9
Suhrob Hojiev (TJK)	8
Demeu Zhadrayev (KAZ)	8
Aram Vardanyan (UZB)	0
Taha Yaseen (IRQ)	0
Tomohiro Inoue (JPN)	4
Kuldeep Malik (IND)	0
Akzhol Makhmudov (KGZ)	8

Semifinals
Jiang Yuan (CHN)	0
Demeu Zhadrayev (KAZ)	8
Tomohiro Inoue (JPN)	0
Akzhol Makhmudov (KGZ)	7

Final
Demeu Zhadrayev (KAZ)	6
Akzhol Makhmudov (KGZ)	8

Repechage round 1
Ahmad Dahshan (JOR)	7
Kuldeep Malik (IND)	9

Bronze medals
Aram Vardanyan (UZB)	9
Jiang Yuan (CHN)	0
Kuldeep Malik (IND)	0
Tomohiro Inoue (JPN)	11^{F}

=== 77 kg ===
27 February

Round of 16
Shohei Yabiku (JPN)	7
Sultan Ali Eid (JOR)	6
Lee Seung-hwan (KOR)	1
Esen Asanov (KGZ)	4
Layth Abushraim (PLE)	0
Bakhtovar Khasanov (TJK)	10
Maxat Yerezhepov (KAZ)	0
Mohammad Ali Geraei (IRI)	3

Quarterfinals
Şermet Permanow (TKM)	0
Yang Bin (CHN)	6
Gurpreet Singh (IND)	7
Jalgasbay Berdimuratov (UZB)	7
Shohei Yabiku (JPN)	2
Esen Asanov (KGZ)	1
Bakhtovar Khasanov (TJK)	0
Mohammad Ali Geraei (IRI)	8

Semifinals
Yang Bin (CHN)	5
Jalgasbay Berdimuratov (UZB)	1
Shohei Yabiku (JPN)	0
Mohammad Ali Geraei (IRI)	8

Final
Yang Bin (CHN)	7
Mohammad Ali Geraei (IRI)	6

Repechage round 1
Maxat Yerezhepov (KAZ)	8
Bakhtovar Khasanov (TJK)	0

Bronze medals
Şermet Permanow (TKM)	7
Jalgasbay Berdimuratov (UZB)	3
Maxat Yerezhepov (KAZ)	3
Shohei Yabiku (JPN)	2

=== 82 kg ===
28 February

Round of 16
~~Hussein Ali (IRQ)~~
Harpreet Singh Sandhu (IND)	WO
Yousef Ghaderian (IRI)	1
Na Junjie (CHN)	2

Quarterfinals
Sukhrob Abdulkhaev (TJK)	0
Kim Jin-hyeok (KOR)	9
Askhat Dilmukhamedov (KAZ)	11
Yuya Maeta (JPN)	1
Nurbek Khashimbekov (UZB)	3
Atabek Azisbekov (KGZ)	3
Harpreet Singh Sandhu (IND)	2
Na Junjie (CHN)	0

Semifinals
Kim Jin-hyeok (KOR)	5
Askhat Dilmukhamedov (KAZ)	10
Atabek Azisbekov (KGZ)	5
Harpreet Singh Sandhu (IND)	0

Final
Askhat Dilmukhamedov (KAZ)	5
Atabek Azisbekov (KGZ)	2

Bronze medals
Yuya Maeta (JPN)	1
Kim Jin-hyeok (KOR)	5
Nurbek Khashimbekov (UZB)	3
Harpreet Singh Sandhu (IND)	11

=== 87 kg ===
27 February

Round of 16
Muhammadali Shamsiddinov (UZB)	11
Sharafjon Fayziev (TJK)	0
Khussein Mutsolgov (KAZ)	13^{F}
Park Hea-geun (KOR)	4

Quarterfinals
Hossein Nouri (IRI)	4
Husham Majeed (IRQ)	0
Peng Fei (CHN)	7
Sunil Kumar (IND)	1
Azat Beishebekov (KGZ)	1
Masato Sumi (JPN)	2
Muhammadali Shamsiddinov (UZB)	0
Khussein Mutsolgov (KAZ)	3

Semifinals
Hossein Nouri (IRI)	4
Peng Fei (CHN)	0
Masato Sumi (JPN)	4
Khussein Mutsolgov (KAZ)	2

Final
Hossein Nouri (IRI)	3
Masato Sumi (JPN)	0

Bronze medals
Husham Majeed (IRQ)	0
Peng Fei (CHN)	3
Azat Beishebekov (KGZ)	5
Khussein Mutsolgov (KAZ)	2

- Husham Majeed of Iraq originally finished fifth, but was disqualified after he tested positive for Testosterone.

=== 97 kg ===
28 February

Round of 16
Uzur Dzhuzupbekov (KGZ)	4^{F}
Mirzoamin Safarov (TJK)	0
Rustam Assakalov (UZB)	8
Yuta Nara (JPN)	0

Quarterfinals
Mostafa Salehizadeh (IRI)	9
Ali Majeed (IRQ)	0
Yerulan Iskakov (KAZ)	3
Xiao Di (CHN)	1
Gu Hak-bon (KOR)	1
Hardeep Singh (IND)	1
Uzur Dzhuzupbekov (KGZ)	2
Rustam Assakalov (UZB)	3

Semifinals
Mostafa Salehizadeh (IRI)	5
Yerulan Iskakov (KAZ)	0
Gu Hak-bon (KOR)	0
Rustam Assakalov (UZB)	8

Final
Mostafa Salehizadeh (IRI)	4
Rustam Assakalov (UZB)	0

Repechage round 1
Yuta Nara (JPN)	0
Uzur Dzhuzupbekov (KGZ)	8

Bronze medals
Ali Majeed (IRQ)	0
Yerulan Iskakov (KAZ)	6
Uzur Dzhuzupbekov (KGZ)	6
Gu Hak-bon (KOR)	4

- Mostafa Salehizadeh of Iran originally won the gold medal, but was disqualified after he tested positive for Stanozolol. Rustam Assakalov was upgraded to the gold medal, Yerulan Iskakov to the silver medal and Ali Majeed was raised to third and took the bronze medal.

=== 130 kg ===
27 February

Round of 16
Arata Sonoda (JPN)	0
Behnam Mehdizadeh (IRI)	9
Hamzeh Odtalla (JOR)	1
Naveen Sevlia (IND)	5

Quarterfinals
Muminjon Abdullaev (UZB)	7
Murat Ramonov (KGZ)	1
Lee Seung-chan (KOR)	4
Anton Savenko (KAZ)	3^{F}
Sukhroj Azizov (TJK)	1
Nie Xiaoming (CHN)	2
Behnam Mehdizadeh (IRI)	5
Naveen Sevlia (IND)	0

Semifinals
Muminjon Abdullaev (UZB)	8
Anton Savenko (KAZ)	0
Nie Xiaoming (CHN)	4
Behnam Mehdizadeh (IRI)	6

Final
Muminjon Abdullaev (UZB)	1
Behnam Mehdizadeh (IRI)	3

Repechage round 1
Arata Sonoda (JPN)	1
Naveen Sevlia (IND)	10

Bronze medals
Murat Ramonov (KGZ)	4^{F}
Anton Savenko (KAZ)	0
Naveen Sevlia (IND)	1
Nie Xiaoming (CHN)	3

== Women's freestyle ==
=== 50 kg ===
1 March

Round of 16
Kim Hyung-joo (KOR)	0
Vinesh Phogat (IND)	6
Saiana Baiyzova (KGZ)	6
Marina Zakshevskaya (KAZ)	4^{F}
Chiu Jo-cih (TPE)	3
Manlika Esati (THA)	1
Yuki Irie (JPN)	11
Kim Hye-gyong (PRK)	6

Quarterfinals
Lei Chun (CHN)	10
Aktenge Keunimjaeva (UZB)	0
Erdenesükhiin Narangerel (MGL)	10
Nguyễn Thị Xuân (VIE)	0
Vinesh Phogat (IND)	12
Marina Zakshevskaya (KAZ)	3
Chiu Jo-cih (TPE)	0
Yuki Irie (JPN)	10

Semifinals
Lei Chun (CHN)	11
Erdenesükhiin Narangerel (MGL)	0
Vinesh Phogat (IND)	4
Yuki Irie (JPN)	4

Final
Lei Chun (CHN)	3
Vinesh Phogat (IND)	2

Repechage round 1
Kim Hyung-joo (KOR)	12
Marina Zakshevskaya (KAZ)	10

Bronze medals
Aktenge Keunimjaeva (UZB)	2
Erdenesükhiin Narangerel (MGL)	8
Kim Hyung-joo (KOR)	0^{R}
Yuki Irie (JPN)	8

=== 53 kg ===
2 March

Round of 16
Sevara Eshmuratova (UZB)	0
Erdenechimegiin Sumiyaa (MGL)	10
Madina Nadirova (KGZ)	0
Zhuldyz Eshimova (KAZ)	10

Quarterfinals
Babita Kumari (IND)	0
Yu Miyahara (JPN)	10
Vũ Thị Hằng (VIE)	0
Pak Yong-mi (PRK)	10
Chiu Hsin-ju (TPE)	4^{F}
Lee Shin-hye (KOR)	0
Erdenechimegiin Sumiyaa (MGL)	4
Zhuldyz Eshimova (KAZ)	2

Semifinals
Yu Miyahara (JPN)	3
Pak Yong-mi (PRK)	4
Chiu Hsin-ju (TPE)	1
Erdenechimegiin Sumiyaa (MGL)	2^{F}

Final
Pak Yong-mi (PRK)	11
Erdenechimegiin Sumiyaa (MGL)	5

Repechage round 1
Sevara Eshmuratova (UZB)	1
Zhuldyz Eshimova (KAZ)	3

Bronze medals
Vũ Thị Hằng (VIE)	0
Yu Miyahara (JPN)	6^{F}
Zhuldyz Eshimova (KAZ)	5
Chiu Hsin-ju (TPE)	0

=== 55 kg ===
1 March

Round of 16
Jantima Virangsa (THA)	0
Kiều Thị Ly (VIE)	8^{F}

Quarterfinals
Lalita Sehrawat (IND)	0
Erkhembayaryn Davaachimeg (MGL)	6
Saki Igarashi (JPN)	10
Nazgul Nurakhan (KAZ)	0
Oh Hye-min (KOR)	6
Luo Lannuan (CHN)	5
Amina Alimbetova (UZB)	6^{F}
Kiều Thị Ly (VIE)	4

Semifinals
Erkhembayaryn Davaachimeg (MGL)	0
Saki Igarashi (JPN)	3
Oh Hye-min (KOR)	3
Amina Alimbetova (UZB)	1

Final
Saki Igarashi (JPN)	5
Oh Hye-min (KOR)	0

Bronze medals
Nazgul Nurakhan (KAZ)	4
Erkhembayaryn Davaachimeg (MGL)	14
Luo Lannuan (CHN)	10
Amina Alimbetova (UZB)	0

=== 57 kg ===
2 March

Round of 16
Gulshaharat Talassova (KAZ)	0
Pei Xingru (CHN)	9^{F}
Asem Seydametova (UZB)	0
Altantsetsegiin Battsetseg (MGL)	11

Quarterfinals
Sara Natami (JPN)	8^{F}
Kim Ye-seul (KOR)	0
Orasa Sookdongyor (THA)	1
Đào Thị Hương (VIE)	12
Pooja Dhanda (IND)	0
Jong In-sun (PRK)	11
Pei Xingru (CHN)	11
Altantsetsegiin Battsetseg (MGL)	1

Semifinals
Sara Natami (JPN)	10
Đào Thị Hương (VIE)	0
Jong In-sun (PRK)	2
Pei Xingru (CHN)	2^{F}

Final
Sara Natami (JPN)	1
Pei Xingru (CHN)	3

Repechage round 1
Gulshaharat Talassova (KAZ)	0
Altantsetsegiin Battsetseg (MGL)	8^{F}

Bronze medals
Kim Ye-seul (KOR)	4
Đào Thị Hương (VIE)	3
Altantsetsegiin Battsetseg (MGL)	7
Jong In-sun (PRK)	4

=== 59 kg ===
1 March

Round of 16
Baatarjavyn Shoovdor (MGL)	10
Nguyễn Thị Vinh (VIE)	0
Nazira Amanzholova (KAZ)	0
Yuzuru Kumano (JPN)	10

Quarterfinals
Nuraida Anarkulova (KGZ)	4
Um Ji-eun (KOR)	7
Sangeeta Phogat (IND)	5
Nabira Esenbaeva (UZB)	15
Phimsuphak Ainphen (THA)	0
Rong Ningning (CHN)	10
Baatarjavyn Shoovdor (MGL)	6^{F}
Yuzuru Kumano (JPN)	0

Semifinals
Um Ji-eun (KOR)	1
Nabira Esenbaeva (UZB)	11
Rong Ningning (CHN)	10
Baatarjavyn Shoovdor (MGL)	0

Final
Nabira Esenbaeva (UZB)	0
Rong Ningning (CHN)	10

Bronze medals
Sangeeta Phogat (IND)	9
Um Ji-eun (KOR)	4
Phimsuphak Ainphen (THA)	0
Baatarjavyn Shoovdor (MGL)	10

=== 62 kg ===
2 March

Round of 16
Luo Xiaojuan (CHN)	6
Sakshi Malik (IND)	6
Choi Ji-ae (KOR)	4^{F}
Salinee Srisombat (THA)	1

Quarterfinals
Nguyễn Thị Mỹ Hạnh (VIE)	0
Yurika Ito (JPN)	4^{F}
Pürevdorjiin Orkhon (MGL)	10
Khalbazar Narbaeva (UZB)	0
Hou Min-wen (TPE)	1
Ayaulym Kassymova (KAZ)	12
Luo Xiaojuan (CHN)	10
Choi Ji-ae (KOR)	0

Semifinals
Yurika Ito (JPN)	1
Pürevdorjiin Orkhon (MGL)	9
Ayaulym Kassymova (KAZ)	1
Luo Xiaojuan (CHN)	5

Final
Pürevdorjiin Orkhon (MGL)	12
Luo Xiaojuan (CHN)	4

Repechage round 1
Sakshi Malik (IND)	11
Choi Ji-ae (KOR)	0

Bronze medals
Khalbazar Narbaeva (UZB)	0
Yurika Ito (JPN)	6^{F}
Sakshi Malik (IND)	10
Ayaulym Kassymova (KAZ)	7

=== 65 kg ===
2 March

Pos	Athlete	Pld	W	L	CP	TP	JPN	IND	UZB
1	Miyu Imai (JPN)	2	2	0	7	14	—	4–4	10–0
2	Navjot Kaur (IND)	2	1	1	5	14	1–3 PO1	—	10–0
3	Bakhtigul Baltaniyazova (UZB)	2	0	2	0	0	0–4 SU	0–4 SU	—

Source: UWW

Pos	Athlete	Pld	W	L	CP	TP	MGL	KOR	KAZ
1	Enkhbayaryn Tsevegmid (MGL)	2	2	0	8	12	—	4–4 Fall	8–0
2	Lee Han-bit (KOR)	2	1	1	3	9	0–5 FA	—	5–1
3	Albina Kairgeldinova (KAZ)	2	0	2	1	1	0–3 PO	1–3 PO1	—

Source: UWW

Semifinals
Miyu Imai (JPN)	10
Lee Han-bit (KOR)	0
Enkhbayaryn Tsevegmid (MGL)	1
Navjot Kaur (IND)	2

Final
Miyu Imai (JPN)	1
Navjot Kaur (IND)	9
Bronze medal
Lee Han-bit (KOR)	6
Enkhbayaryn Tsevegmid (MGL)	6

=== 68 kg ===
1 March

Round of 16
Divya Kakran (IND)	2^{F}
Chen Wen-ling (TPE)	0

Quarterfinals
Nilufar Gadaeva (UZB)	0
Irina Kazyulina (KAZ)	2^{F}
Zhou Feng (CHN)	10^{F}
Park Su-jin (KOR)	4
Mai Hayakawa (JPN)	1
Meerim Zhumanazarova (KGZ)	5
Sharkhüügiin Tümentsetseg (MGL)	10
Divya Kakran (IND)	0

Semifinals
Irina Kazyulina (KAZ)	0
Zhou Feng (CHN)	10
Meerim Zhumanazarova (KGZ)	2
Sharkhüügiin Tümentsetseg (MGL)	2

Final
Zhou Feng (CHN)	10
Sharkhüügiin Tümentsetseg (MGL)	0

Bronze medals
Park Su-jin (KOR)	2
Irina Kazyulina (KAZ)	8
Divya Kakran (IND)	6
Meerim Zhumanazarova (KGZ)	12

=== 72 kg ===
2 March

Pos	Athlete	Pld	W	L	CP	TP	MGL	JPN	UZB
1	Ochirbatyn Nasanburmaa (MGL)	2	2	0	10	16	—	12–2 Fall	4–0 Fall
2	Masako Furuichi (JPN)	2	1	1	5	6	0–5 FA	—	4–0 Fall
3	Lalakhan Orinbaeva (UZB)	2	0	2	0	0	0–5 FA	0–5 FA	—

Source: UWW

Pos	Athlete	Pld	W	L	CP	TP	CHN	KAZ	IND
1	Han Yue (CHN)	2	2	0	10	10	—	8–2 Fall	2–0 Fall
2	Zhamila Bakbergenova (KAZ)	2	1	1	4	13	0–5 FA	—	11–1
3	Pinki Malik (IND)	2	0	2	1	1	0–5 FA	1–4 SU1	—

Source: UWW

Semifinals
Ochirbatyn Nasanburmaa (MGL)	9^{F}
Zhamila Bakbergenova (KAZ)	4
Han Yue (CHN)	10
Masako Furuichi (JPN)	0

Final
Ochirbatyn Nasanburmaa (MGL)	0
Han Yue (CHN)	11
Bronze medal
Zhamila Bakbergenova (KAZ)	0
Masako Furuichi (JPN)	10

=== 76 kg ===
1 March

Round of 16
Shakhribonu Ellieva (UZB)	0
Kiran Bishnoi (IND)	10^{F}

Quarterfinals
Hiroe Minagawa (JPN)	2^{F}
Aiperi Medet Kyzy (KGZ)	0
Hwang Eun-ju (KOR)	3
Chang Hui-tsz (TPE)	0
Amgalanbaataryn Chantsalnyamaa (MGL)	1
Zhou Qian (CHN)	6
Elmira Syzdykova (KAZ)	13
Kiran Bishnoi (IND)	3

Semifinals
Hiroe Minagawa (JPN)	10
Hwang Eun-ju (KOR)	0
Zhou Qian (CHN)	2
Elmira Syzdykova (KAZ)	1

Final
Hiroe Minagawa (JPN)	2
Zhou Qian (CHN)	7

Bronze medals
Aiperi Medet Kyzy (KGZ)	0
Hwang Eun-ju (KOR)	12^{F}
Amgalanbaataryn Chantsalnyamaa (MGL)	1
Elmira Syzdykova (KAZ)	11
