= 2019 Asian Wrestling Championships – Results =

These are the results of the 2019 Asian Wrestling Championships which took place between 23 and 28 April 2019 in Xi'an, China.

== Men's freestyle ==
=== 57 kg ===
23 April

Round of 16
Bekbolot Myrzanazar Uulu (KGZ)	5
Kim Sung-gwon (KOR)	7
Yuki Takahashi (JPN)	4
Zou Wanhao (CHN)	1
Liu Chia-tso (TPE)	0
Kang Kum-song (PRK)	10
Ravi Kumar Dahiya (IND)	9
Meirambek Kartbay (KAZ)	4

Quarterfinals
Hikmatullo Vohidov (TJK)	4
Reza Atri (IRI)	14
Makhmudjon Shavkatov (UZB)	7
Narmandakhyn Nasanbuyan (MGL)	2
Kim Sung-gwon (KOR)	0
Yuki Takahashi (JPN)	10
Kang Kum-song (PRK)	10
Ravi Kumar Dahiya (IND)	0

Semifinals
Reza Atri (IRI)	2
Makhmudjon Shavkatov (UZB)	1
Yuki Takahashi (JPN)	1
Kang Kum-song (PRK)	3

Final
Reza Atri (IRI)	9
Kang Kum-song (PRK)	3

Repechage round 1
Liu Chia-tso (TPE)	0
Ravi Kumar Dahiya (IND)	4^{F}

Bronze medals
Hikmatullo Vohidov (TJK)	0
Makhmudjon Shavkatov (UZB)	4
Ravi Kumar Dahiya (IND)	3
Yuki Takahashi (JPN)	5

=== 61 kg ===
24 April

Round of 16
Andy Lau (HKG)	0
Ulukbek Zholdoshbekov (KGZ)	2^{F}
Yudai Fujita (JPN)	WO
~~Mohammed Al-Jawad (IRQ)~~
Bauyrzhan Torebek (KAZ)	3
Ri Kum-song (PRK)	8
Kim Jin-cheol (KOR)	2
Tseveensürengiin Tsogbadrakh (MGL)	1
Behnam Ehsanpour (IRI)	10
Siripong Jumpakam (THA)	0
Jahongirmirza Turobov (UZB)	0
Rahul Aware (IND)	10

Quarterfinals
Liu Minghu (CHN)	12
Dzhamshed Sharifov (TJK)	2
Ulukbek Zholdoshbekov (KGZ)	4
Yudai Fujita (JPN)	6
Ri Kum-song (PRK)	1
Kim Jin-cheol (KOR)	1
Behnam Ehsanpour (IRI)	4^{F}
Rahul Aware (IND)	0

Semifinals
Liu Minghu (CHN)	9
Yudai Fujita (JPN)	2
Kim Jin-cheol (KOR)	1
Behnam Ehsanpour (IRI)	12

Final
Liu Minghu (CHN)	1
Behnam Ehsanpour (IRI)	2

Repechage round 1
Siripong Jumpakam (THA)	2
Rahul Aware (IND)	12

Bronze medals
Dzhamshed Sharifov (TJK)	1
Yudai Fujita (JPN)	3
Rahul Aware (IND)	9
Kim Jin-cheol (KOR)	2

=== 65 kg ===
23 April

Round of 16
Sayatbek Okassov (KAZ)	9
Haji Mohamad Ali (BRN)	1
Ernazar Akmataliev (KGZ)	10
Lo Yu-cheng (TPE)	0
Kim Han-song (PRK)	10
Lim Zi Xyan (SGP)	0
Gerçek Hemraýew (TKM)	2
Yun Jun-sik (KOR)	8
Sirojiddin Khasanov (UZB)	10
Abdulqosim Fayziev (TJK)	0
Tömör-Ochiryn Tulga (MGL)	4
Koki Shimizu (JPN)	4
Charles Fernando (SRI)	0
Bajrang Punia (IND)	10
Yeerlanbieke Katai (CHN)	7
Peyman Biabani (IRI)	7

Quarterfinals
Sayatbek Okassov (KAZ)	10
Ernazar Akmataliev (KGZ)	0
Kim Han-song (PRK)	2
Yun Jun-sik (KOR)	0
Sirojiddin Khasanov (UZB)	4
Koki Shimizu (JPN)	0
Bajrang Punia (IND)	6
Peyman Biabani (IRI)	0

Semifinals
Sayatbek Okassov (KAZ)	4
Kim Han-song (PRK)	4
Sirojiddin Khasanov (UZB)	1
Bajrang Punia (IND)	12^{F}

Final
Sayatbek Okassov (KAZ)	7
Bajrang Punia (IND)	12

Repechage round 1
Haji Mohamad Ali (BRN)	4
Ernazar Akmataliev (KGZ)	4
Charles Fernando (SRI)	0
Peyman Biabani (IRI)	11

Bronze medals
Haji Mohamad Ali (BRN)	0
Kim Han-song (PRK)	10
Peyman Biabani (IRI)	3
Sirojiddin Khasanov (UZB)	2

=== 70 kg ===
23 April

Round of 16
Lou Hong Yeow (SGP)	4^{F}
Leung Tsz Shing (HKG)	0
Abdulrahman Ibrahim (QAT)	0
Kojiro Shiga (JPN)	10
Chang Yu-hsuan (TPE)	0
Mansur Syrgak Uulu (KGZ)	11
Yuan Shaohua (CHN)	8
Han Dae-su (KOR)	2
Younes Emami (IRI)	11
Rajneesh Dalal (IND)	0
Enkhtuyaagiin Temüülen (MGL)	10
Ikhtiyor Navruzov (UZB)	0
Sorbon Abdulkhaev (TJK)	0
Batyr Borjakow (TKM)	10
~~Karam Shakir (IRQ)~~
Nurkozha Kaipanov (KAZ)	WO

Quarterfinals
Lou Hong Yeow (SGP)	0
Kojiro Shiga (JPN)	10
Mansur Syrgak Uulu (KGZ)	5
Yuan Shaohua (CHN)	7
Younes Emami (IRI)	12
Enkhtuyaagiin Temüülen (MGL)	2
Batyr Borjakow (TKM)	0
Nurkozha Kaipanov (KAZ)	11

Semifinals
Kojiro Shiga (JPN)	14
Yuan Shaohua (CHN)	3
Younes Emami (IRI)	2
Nurkozha Kaipanov (KAZ)	12

Final
Kojiro Shiga (JPN)	0
Nurkozha Kaipanov (KAZ)	9

Repechage round 1
Abdulrahman Ibrahim (QAT)	12
Lou Hong Yeow (SGP)	10
~~Karam Shakir (IRQ)~~
Batyr Borjakow (TKM)	WO

Bronze medals
Abdulrahman Ibrahim (QAT)	0
Yuan Shaohua (CHN)	10
Batyr Borjakow (TKM)	0
Younes Emami (IRI)	11

=== 74 kg ===
24 April

Round of 16
Daniyar Kaisanov (KAZ)	8
Batsuuriin Otgonbayar (MGL)	1
Lee Seung-chul (KOR)	7
Gulomdzhon Sharipov (TJK)	1
Ilgiz Dzhakypbekov (KGZ)	10
Yeung Yip Cheuk (HKG)	0
Amit Kumar Dhankar (IND)	2
Mohammad Nokhodi (IRI)	1
Luo Yin (CHN)	7
Yuhi Fujinami (JPN)	11

Quarterfinals
Süleýman Omarow (TKM)	0
Adam Batirov (BRN)	10
Artyom Prisyajnyuk (UZB)	0
Daniyar Kaisanov (KAZ)	12
Lee Seung-chul (KOR)	5
Ilgiz Dzhakypbekov (KGZ)	9
Amit Kumar Dhankar (IND)	WO
Yuhi Fujinami (JPN)

Semifinals
Adam Batirov (BRN)
Daniyar Kaisanov (KAZ)	WO
Ilgiz Dzhakypbekov (KGZ)	0
Amit Kumar Dhankar (IND)	5

Final
Daniyar Kaisanov (KAZ)	5
Amit Kumar Dhankar (IND)	0

Repechage round 1
Batsuuriin Otgonbayar (MGL)	8^{F}
Artyom Prisyajnyuk (UZB)	2
Mohammad Nokhodi (IRI)	WO
Yuhi Fujinami (JPN)

Bronze medals
Batsuuriin Otgonbayar (MGL)	WO
Adam Batirov (BRN)
Mohammad Nokhodi (IRI)	9
Ilgiz Dzhakypbekov (KGZ)	8

- Batsuuriin Otgonbayar of Mongolia originally won the bronze medal, but was disqualified after he tested positive for 19-Norandrosterone at the 2019 Asian U23 Wrestling Championships one month before the competition. Adam Batirov was raised to third and took the bronze medal.

=== 79 kg ===
23 April

Round of 16
Azamjon Yusupov (TJK)	0
Galymzhan Usserbayev (KAZ)	10
Yuta Abe (JPN)	10
Şähergeldi Saparmyradow (TKM)	3
Parveen Rana (IND)	6
Denzensharavyn Tögs-Erdene (MGL)	2

Quarterfinals
Oibek Nasirov (KGZ)	4
Bahman Teymouri (IRI)	11
Jang Woo-min (KOR)	2
Lin Zeping (CHN)	10
Nodirbek Egamberdiev (UZB)	0
Galymzhan Usserbayev (KAZ)	8
Yuta Abe (JPN)	6
Parveen Rana (IND)	6

Semifinals
Bahman Teymouri (IRI)	12^{F}
Lin Zeping (CHN)	2
Galymzhan Usserbayev (KAZ)	2
Parveen Rana (IND)	3

Final
Bahman Teymouri (IRI)	3
Parveen Rana (IND)	0

Repechage round 1
Denzensharavyn Tögs-Erdene (MGL)	2
Yuta Abe (JPN)	12

Bronze medals
Oibek Nasirov (KGZ)	2^{F}
Lin Zeping (CHN)	1
Yuta Abe (JPN)	0
Galymzhan Usserbayev (KAZ)	6

=== 86 kg ===
24 April

Round of 16
Kim Gwan-uk (KOR)	7
Bakhodur Kadirov (TJK)	8
Deepak Punia (IND)	11
Döwletmyrat Orazgylyjow (TKM)	7
Lin Zushen (CHN)	WO
~~Issa Abdul-Salam (IRQ)~~
Takahiro Murayama (JPN)	12
Suresh Fernando (SRI)	1
Aligadzhi Gamidgadzhiev (KGZ)	4
Ganbaataryn Gankhuyag (MGL)	2
Fedaeddin Al-Osta (SYR)	2
Abdurasul Vakhobov (UZB)	13
Domenic Abounader (LBN)	6
Adilet Davlumbayev (KAZ)	9

Quarterfinals
Kamran Ghasempour (IRI)	10
Bakhodur Kadirov (TJK)	0
Deepak Punia (IND)	3
Lin Zushen (CHN)	3
Takahiro Murayama (JPN)	7
Aligadzhi Gamidgadzhiev (KGZ)	15
Abdurasul Vakhobov (UZB)	14
Adilet Davlumbayev (KAZ)	8

Semifinals
Kamran Ghasempour (IRI)	10
Deepak Punia (IND)	0
Aligadzhi Gamidgadzhiev (KGZ)	10
Abdurasul Vakhobov (UZB)	7

Final
Kamran Ghasempour (IRI)	10
Aligadzhi Gamidgadzhiev (KGZ)	0

Repechage round 1
Ganbaataryn Gankhuyag (MGL)	1
Takahiro Murayama (JPN)	1

Bronze medals
Bakhodur Kadirov (TJK)	2
Deepak Punia (IND)	8
Ganbaataryn Gankhuyag (MGL)	4
Abdurasul Vakhobov (UZB)	0

=== 92 kg ===
24 April

Round of 16
Yeraly Abdrashev (KAZ)	7
Azat Gajyýew (TKM)	0
Alireza Karimi (IRI)	10
Chyngyz Kerimkulov (KGZ)	0
Atsushi Matsumoto (JPN)	8
Sue Chang-jae (KOR)	4

Quarterfinals
Sun Xiao (CHN)	7
Baasantsogtyn Ölziisaikhan (MGL)	4
Vicky Chahar (IND)	WO
~~Muhammad Inam (PAK)~~
Azizbek Soliev (UZB)	10
Yeraly Abdrashev (KAZ)	0
Alireza Karimi (IRI)	10
Atsushi Matsumoto (JPN)	0

Semifinals
Sun Xiao (CHN)	2
Vicky Chahar (IND)	3
Azizbek Soliev (UZB)	0
Alireza Karimi (IRI)	10

Final
Vicky Chahar (IND)	0
Alireza Karimi (IRI)	11

Repechage round 1
Chyngyz Kerimkulov (KGZ)	0
Atsushi Matsumoto (JPN)	10

Bronze medals
~~Muhammad Inam (PAK)~~
Sun Xiao (CHN)	WO
Atsushi Matsumoto (JPN)	9
Azizbek Soliev (UZB)	3

=== 97 kg ===
23 April

Round of 16
Leonard Arthur Kong (SGP)	0
Seo Min-won (KOR)	10
Naoya Akaguma (JPN)	0
Magomed Musaev (KGZ)	10
Selimmuhammet Muhadyýew (TKM)	0
Reza Yazdani (IRI)	5

Quarterfinals
Ölziisaikhany Batzul (MGL)	7
Satyawart Kadian (IND)	1
Gao Haobin (CHN)	7^{F}
Rustam Iskandari (TJK)	8
Alisher Yergali (KAZ)	6
Seo Min-won (KOR)	2
Magomed Musaev (KGZ)	4
Reza Yazdani (IRI)	16

Semifinals
Ölziisaikhany Batzul (MGL)	10
Gao Haobin (CHN)	0
Alisher Yergali (KAZ)	3
Reza Yazdani (IRI)	9

Final
Ölziisaikhany Batzul (MGL)	4
Reza Yazdani (IRI)	7

Repechage round 1
Selimmuhammet Muhadyýew (TKM)	0
Magomed Musaev (KGZ)	10

Bronze medals
Satyawart Kadian (IND)	8
Gao Haobin (CHN)	2
Magomed Musaev (KGZ)	2
Alisher Yergali (KAZ)	6

=== 125 kg ===
24 April

Round of 16
Mönkhtöriin Lkhagvagerel (MGL)	0
Oleg Boltin (KAZ)	2
Muzafar Zhappuev (KGZ)	0
Yadollah Mohebbi (IRI)	11
Kim Dong-hwan (KOR)	5
Söhbet Belliýew (TKM)	1

Quarterfinals
Farkhod Anakulov (TJK)	4
Nobuyoshi Arakida (JPN)	2
Sumit Malik (IND)	0
Deng Zhiwei (CHN)	3
Khasanboy Rakhimov (UZB)	2
Oleg Boltin (KAZ)	0
Yadollah Mohebbi (IRI)	10
Kim Dong-hwan (KOR)	0

Semifinals
Farkhod Anakulov (TJK)	0
Deng Zhiwei (CHN)	10
Khasanboy Rakhimov (UZB)	0
Yadollah Mohebbi (IRI)	11

Final
Deng Zhiwei (CHN)	1
Yadollah Mohebbi (IRI)	2

Repechage round 1
Muzafar Zhappuev (KGZ)	2
Kim Dong-hwan (KOR)	7^{F}

Bronze medals
Sumit Malik (IND)	8
Farkhod Anakulov (TJK)	2
Kim Dong-hwan (KOR)	4^{F}
Khasanboy Rakhimov (UZB)	1

== Men's Greco-Roman ==
=== 55 kg ===
27 April

Round of 16
Khorlan Zhakansha (KAZ)	11
Ro Yu-chol (PRK)	9
Mönkh-Erdeniin Davaabandi (MGL)	14
Zhou Yunqiang (CHN)	7

Quarterfinals
Ilkhom Bakhromov (UZB)	4
Reza Khedri (IRI)	4
Manjeet Chahar (IND)	3
Asan Sulaimanov (KGZ)	5
Jeon Hyeok-jin (KOR)	0
Hiromu Katagiri (JPN)	10^{F}
Khorlan Zhakansha (KAZ)	9
Mönkh-Erdeniin Davaabandi (MGL)	0

Semifinals
Ilkhom Bakhromov (UZB)	11
Asan Sulaimanov (KGZ)	3
Hiromu Katagiri (JPN)	9
Khorlan Zhakansha (KAZ)	4

Final
Ilkhom Bakhromov (UZB)	1
Hiromu Katagiri (JPN)	1

Bronze medals
Reza Khedri (IRI)	1
Asan Sulaimanov (KGZ)	3
Jeon Hyeok-jin (KOR)	0
Khorlan Zhakansha (KAZ)	9

=== 60 kg ===
28 April

Round of 16
Mehrdad Mardani (IRI)	2
Kenichiro Fumita (JPN)	3
Ri Se-ung (PRK)	9
Umit Durdyýew (TKM)	1
Meirambek Ainagulov (KAZ)	4
Lee Jung-baik (KOR)	6
Walihan Sailike (CHN)	2
Rustam Teiishov (KGZ)	0

Quarterfinals
Huang Jui-chi (TPE)	0
Islomjon Bakhromov (UZB)	9
Gyanender Dahiya (IND)	9
Ali Abuseif (JOR)	1
Kenichiro Fumita (JPN)	3
Ri Se-ung (PRK)	5
Lee Jung-baik (KOR)	1
Walihan Sailike (CHN)	3

Semifinals
Islomjon Bakhromov (UZB)	9
Gyanender Dahiya (IND)	0
Ri Se-ung (PRK)	5
Walihan Sailike (CHN)	2

Final
Islomjon Bakhromov (UZB)	12
Ri Se-ung (PRK)	4

Repechage round 1
Umit Durdyýew (TKM)	4
Kenichiro Fumita (JPN)	12

Bronze medals
Huang Jui-chi (TPE)	0
Gyanender Dahiya (IND)	9
Kenichiro Fumita (JPN)	WO
Walihan Sailike (CHN)

=== 63 kg ===
27 April

Round of 16
Yoshiki Yamada (JPN)	WO
~~Islomidin Mazitov (TJK)~~

Quarterfinals
Jung Jin-woong (KOR)	8
Vikram Kurade (IND)	0
Elmurat Tasmuradov (UZB)	9
Urmatbek Amatov (KGZ)	0
Tuo Erbatu (CHN)	4
Kudaibergen Tursynov (KAZ)	0
Saman Abdevali (IRI)	11
Yoshiki Yamada (JPN)	2

Semifinals
Jung Jin-woong (KOR)	2
Elmurat Tasmuradov (UZB)	12
Tuo Erbatu (CHN)	6
Saman Abdevali (IRI)	4

Final
Elmurat Tasmuradov (UZB)	3^{R}
Tuo Erbatu (CHN)	4

Bronze medals
Urmatbek Amatov (KGZ)	3
Jung Jin-woong (KOR)	7
Kudaibergen Tursynov (KAZ)	1
Saman Abdevali (IRI)	2

=== 67 kg ===
28 April

Round of 16
Zhang Gaoquan (CHN)	0
Meirzhan Shermakhanbet (KAZ)	9
Nurgazy Asangulov (KGZ)	0
Hamed Tab (IRI)	8
Ahmad Dahshan (JOR)	0
Mirzobek Rakhmatov (UZB)	9
Azatjan Açilow (TKM)	10
Gankhuyagiin Khanbürged (MGL)	12
Ravinder Singh (IND)	4
Mubinjon Akhmedov (TJK)	5
Ryu Han-su (KOR)	3
Shogo Takahashi (JPN)	1

Quarterfinals
Abdulkarim Al-Hasan (SYR)	9
Lin Fu-hao (TPE)	0
Meirzhan Shermakhanbet (KAZ)	7
Hamed Tab (IRI)	5
Mirzobek Rakhmatov (UZB)	8
Gankhuyagiin Khanbürged (MGL)	0
Mubinjon Akhmedov (TJK)	1
Ryu Han-su (KOR)	11

Semifinals
Abdulkarim Al-Hasan (SYR)	2
Meirzhan Shermakhanbet (KAZ)	10
Mirzobek Rakhmatov (UZB)	2
Ryu Han-su (KOR)	7

Final
Meirzhan Shermakhanbet (KAZ)	1
Ryu Han-su (KOR)	5

Repechage round 1
Zhang Gaoquan (CHN)	3
Hamed Tab (IRI)	2
Shogo Takahashi (JPN)	4
Mubinjon Akhmedov (TJK)	1

Bronze medals
Zhang Gaoquan (CHN)	7
Abdulkarim Al-Hasan (SYR)	0
Shogo Takahashi (JPN)	5
Mirzobek Rakhmatov (UZB)	2

=== 72 kg ===
28 April

Round of 16
Tomohiro Inoue (JPN)	3
Lee Ji-yeon (KOR)	7

Quarterfinals
Ruslan Tsarev (KGZ)	10
Khabibdzhon Zukhurov (TJK)	0
Yogesh Sangwan (IND)	0
Zhang Hujun (CHN)	9
Aram Vardanyan (UZB)	0
Mohammad Reza Geraei (IRI)	8
Demeu Zhadrayev (KAZ)	4
Lee Ji-yeon (KOR)	2

Semifinals
Ruslan Tsarev (KGZ)	5
Zhang Hujun (CHN)	5
Mohammad Reza Geraei (IRI)	9
Demeu Zhadrayev (KAZ)	3

Final
Zhang Hujun (CHN)	0
Mohammad Reza Geraei (IRI)	5

Bronze medals
Yogesh Sangwan (IND)	0
Ruslan Tsarev (KGZ)	8
Aram Vardanyan (UZB)	2
Demeu Zhadrayev (KAZ)	3^{F}

=== 77 kg ===
27 April

Round of 16
Rabbia Khalil (PLE)	0
Kim Hyeon-woo (KOR)	5^{F}
Zhang Ridong (CHN)	0
Bilan Nalgiev (UZB)	3
Mohammad Ali Geraei (IRI)	8
Kairatbek Tugolbaev (KGZ)	0

Quarterfinals
Tamerlan Shadukayev (KAZ)	9
Annamuhammet Mosanow (TKM)	0
Gurpreet Singh (IND)	10
Bakhit Sharif Badr (QAT)	0
Naotsugu Shoji (JPN)	0
Kim Hyeon-woo (KOR)	4^{F}
Bilan Nalgiev (UZB)	0
Mohammad Ali Geraei (IRI)	4

Semifinals
Tamerlan Shadukayev (KAZ)	5
Gurpreet Singh (IND)	6^{F}
Kim Hyeon-woo (KOR)	8
Mohammad Ali Geraei (IRI)	0

Final
Gurpreet Singh (IND)	0
Kim Hyeon-woo (KOR)	8

Repechage round 1
Rabbia Khalil (PLE)	0
Naotsugu Shoji (JPN)	9

Bronze medals
Bakhit Sharif Badr (QAT)	0
Tamerlan Shadukayev (KAZ)	8
Naotsugu Shoji (JPN)	0
Mohammad Ali Geraei (IRI)	9

=== 82 kg ===
28 April

Round of 16
Yuya Okajima (JPN)	2
Qian Haitao (CHN)	8

Quarterfinals
Saeid Abdevali (IRI)	9
Maxat Yerezhepov (KAZ)	0
Jalgasbay Berdimuratov (UZB)	WO
~~Sukhrob Abdulkhaev (TJK)~~
Harpreet Singh Sandhu (IND)	5
Burgo Beishaliev (KGZ)	1
Park Sang-hyeok (KOR)	3
Qian Haitao (CHN)	8

Semifinals
Saeid Abdevali (IRI)	10
Jalgasbay Berdimuratov (UZB)	0
Harpreet Singh Sandhu (IND)	10
Qian Haitao (CHN)	1

Final
Saeid Abdevali (IRI)	8
Harpreet Singh Sandhu (IND)	0

Bronze medals
Maxat Yerezhepov (KAZ)	2^{F}
Jalgasbay Berdimuratov (UZB)	5
Burgo Beishaliev (KGZ)	0
Qian Haitao (CHN)	9

=== 87 kg ===
27 April

Round of 16
Park Hea-geun (KOR)	0
Masato Sumi (JPN)	2
Peng Fei (CHN)	1
Hossein Nouri (IRI)	3

Quarterfinals
Atabek Azisbekov (KGZ)	3
Azamat Kustubayev (KAZ)	5
Sunil Kumar (IND)	14
Tokhirdzhon Okhonov (TJK)	7
Rustam Assakalov (UZB)	10
Şyhazberdi Öwelekow (TKM)	1
Masato Sumi (JPN)	2
Hossein Nouri (IRI)	4

Semifinals
Azamat Kustubayev (KAZ)	6
Sunil Kumar (IND)	6^{F}
Rustam Assakalov (UZB)	1
Hossein Nouri (IRI)	3

Final
Sunil Kumar (IND)	0
Hossein Nouri (IRI)	2

Repechage round 1
Peng Fei (CHN)	1
Masato Sumi (JPN)	2

Bronze medals
Tokhirdzhon Okhonov (TJK)	0
Azamat Kustubayev (KAZ)	8
Masato Sumi (JPN)	1
Rustam Assakalov (UZB)	9

=== 97 kg ===
28 April

Round of 16
Mehdi Aliyari (IRI)	8
Yuta Nara (JPN)	0

Quarterfinals
Xiao Di (CHN)	6
Hardeep Singh (IND)	3
Lee Se-yeol (KOR)	1
Jahongir Turdiev (UZB)	2
Uzur Dzhuzupbekov (KGZ)	6
Alimkhan Syzdykov (KAZ)	3
Chen Cheng-hao (TPE)	0
Mehdi Aliyari (IRI)	9

Semifinals
Xiao Di (CHN)	1
Jahongir Turdiev (UZB)	4
Uzur Dzhuzupbekov (KGZ)	7
Mehdi Aliyari (IRI)	5

Final
Jahongir Turdiev (UZB)	2
Uzur Dzhuzupbekov (KGZ)	3

Bronze medals
Lee Se-yeol (KOR)	1
Xiao Di (CHN)	1
Alimkhan Syzdykov (KAZ)	2
Mehdi Aliyari (IRI)	4

=== 130 kg ===
27 April

Quarterfinals		Semifinals		Final
Prem Saroha (IND)	0
Muminjon Abdullaev (UZB)	8	Muminjon Abdullaev (UZB)	3
Meng Lingzhe (CHN)	0	Damir Kuzembayev (KAZ)	3
Damir Kuzembayev (KAZ)	9			Muminjon Abdullaev (UZB)	2
Amir Ghasemi Monjazi (IRI)	2			Amir Ghasemi Monjazi (IRI)	3
Murat Ramonov (KGZ)	1	Amir Ghasemi Monjazi (IRI)	8
Kim Min-seok (KOR)	8	Kim Min-seok (KOR)	0
Ryuta Kono (JPN)	0

Bronze medals
Prem Saroha (IND)	0
Damir Kuzembayev (KAZ)	5^{F}
Murat Ramonov (KGZ)	10
Kim Min-seok (KOR)	2

== Women's freestyle ==
=== 50 kg ===
25 April

Round of 16
Seema Bisla (IND)	0
Yuki Irie (JPN)	10
Oh Hyun-young (KOR)	6^{F}
Dauletbike Yakhshimuratova (UZB)	8
Alvina Lim (SGP)	0
Luknam Bunson (THA)	4^{F}
Nguyễn Thị Xuân (VIE)	0
Hwang Yong-ok (PRK)	10
Sun Yanan (CHN)	WO
~~Asha Niroshani Karunasena (SRI)~~

Quarterfinals
Valentina Islamova (KAZ)	7
Tsogt-Ochiryn Namuuntsetseg (MGL)	4
Hsieh Meng-hsuan (TPE)	0
Yuki Irie (JPN)	10
Oh Hyun-young (KOR)	12
Luknam Bunson (THA)	1
Hwang Yong-ok (PRK)	0
Sun Yanan (CHN)	10^{F}

Semifinals
Valentina Islamova (KAZ)	0
Yuki Irie (JPN)	10
Oh Hyun-young (KOR)	0
Sun Yanan (CHN)	10

Final
Yuki Irie (JPN)	6
Sun Yanan (CHN)	4

Repechage round 1
Seema Bisla (IND)	10
Hsieh Meng-hsuan (TPE)	2
~~Asha Niroshani Karunasena (SRI)~~
Hwang Yong-ok (PRK)	WO

Bronze medals
Seema Bisla (IND)	5
Valentina Islamova (KAZ)	11
Hwang Yong-ok (PRK)	6
Oh Hyun-young (KOR)	3

=== 53 kg ===
26 April

Round of 16
Chiu Jo-cih (TPE)	0
Mayu Mukaida (JPN)	10
Tatyana Akhmetova-Amanzhol (KAZ)	2
Pang Qianyu (CHN)	10
Madina Nadirova (KGZ)	6
Batbaataryn Enkhtsetseg (MGL)	6

Quarterfinals
Aktenge Keunimjaeva (UZB)	0
Pak Yong-mi (PRK)	10
Kim Hyung-joo (KOR)	10
Bùi Thị Đào (VIE)	0
Vinesh Phogat (IND)	0
Mayu Mukaida (JPN)	10
Pang Qianyu (CHN)	4
Batbaataryn Enkhtsetseg (MGL)	0

Semifinals
Pak Yong-mi (PRK)	6^{F}
Kim Hyung-joo (KOR)	0
Mayu Mukaida (JPN)	10
Pang Qianyu (CHN)	4

Final
Pak Yong-mi (PRK)	4
Mayu Mukaida (JPN)	3

Repechage round 1
Chiu Jo-cih (TPE)	0
Vinesh Phogat (IND)	6^{F}

Bronze medals
Aktenge Keunimjaeva (UZB)	9
Kim Hyung-joo (KOR)	3
Vinesh Phogat (IND)	8
Pang Qianyu (CHN)	1

=== 55 kg ===
25 April

Round of 16
Shakhodat Djullibaeva (UZB)	7
Peng Ya-ling (TPE)	4
Kiều Thị Ly (VIE)	3
Mönkhboldyn Dölgöön (MGL)	11^{F}
Lalita Sehrawat (IND)	10
Yap Su Jun (SGP)	0

Quarterfinals
Marina Sedneva (KAZ)	4^{F}
Apinya Taengphonkrang (THA)	0
Kim Hae-yeung (KOR)	0
Xie Mengyu (CHN)	4^{F}
Saki Igarashi (JPN)	13
Shakhodat Djullibaeva (UZB)	2
Mönkhboldyn Dölgöön (MGL)	4
Lalita Sehrawat (IND)	1

Semifinals
Marina Sedneva (KAZ)	0
Xie Mengyu (CHN)	11
Saki Igarashi (JPN)	9
Mönkhboldyn Dölgöön (MGL)	0

Final
Xie Mengyu (CHN)	10
Saki Igarashi (JPN)	0

Bronze medals
Kim Hae-yeung (KOR)	4^{R}
Marina Sedneva (KAZ)	5
Shakhodat Djullibaeva (UZB)	0
Mönkhboldyn Dölgöön (MGL)	11^{F}

=== 57 kg ===
26 April

Round of 16
Danielle Lim (SGP)	0
Emma Tissina (KAZ)	10
Sevara Eshmuratova (UZB)	0
Pooja Dhanda (IND)	10

Quarterfinals
Nguyễn Thị Mỹ Trang (VIE)	0
Jong Myong-suk (PRK)	10
Kaori Icho (JPN)	10
Um Ji-eun (KOR)	0
Rong Ningning (CHN)	4
Sükheegiin Tserenchimed (MGL)	3
Emma Tissina (KAZ)	3
Pooja Dhanda (IND)	7

Semifinals
Jong Myong-suk (PRK)	7
Kaori Icho (JPN)	4
Rong Ningning (CHN)	8
Pooja Dhanda (IND)	4

Final
Jong Myong-suk (PRK)	2
Rong Ningning (CHN)	4

Bronze medals
Nguyễn Thị Mỹ Trang (VIE)	0
Kaori Icho (JPN)	4^{F}
Sükheegiin Tserenchimed (MGL)	5
Pooja Dhanda (IND)	3

=== 59 kg ===
25 April

Quarterfinals		Semifinals		Final
Đào Thị Hương (VIE)	0
Altantsetsegiin Battsetseg (MGL)	10	Altantsetsegiin Battsetseg (MGL)	15
Manju Kumari (IND)	5	Manju Kumari (IND)	6
Madina Bakbergenova (KAZ)	3			Altantsetsegiin Battsetseg (MGL)	0
Nigora Bakirova (UZB)	0			Yuzuka Inagaki (JPN)	10
Zhang Qi (CHN)	8^{F}	Zhang Qi (CHN)	0
Yuzuka Inagaki (JPN)	8^{F}	Yuzuka Inagaki (JPN)	10
Choi Yeon-woo (KOR)	0

Bronze medals
Đào Thị Hương (VIE)	2
Manju Kumari (IND)	11
Choi Yeon-woo (KOR)	0
Zhang Qi (CHN)	6^{F}

=== 62 kg ===
26 April

Round of 16
Ayaulym Kassymova (KAZ)	2
Mun Hyon-gyong (PRK)	12^{F}
Pei Xingru (CHN)	6^{F}
Enkhbatyn Gantuyaa (MGL)	0
Nguyễn Thị Mỹ Hạnh (VIE)	7
Sakshi Malik (IND)	7
Choi Ji-ae (KOR)	0
Yukako Kawai (JPN)	8

Quarterfinals
Aisuluu Tynybekova (KGZ)	10
Nabira Esenbaeva (UZB)	0
Salinee Srisombat (THA)	10
Madeline Wee (SGP)	0
Mun Hyon-gyong (PRK)	6
Pei Xingru (CHN)	1
Sakshi Malik (IND)	0
Yukako Kawai (JPN)	5^{F}

Semifinals
Aisuluu Tynybekova (KGZ)	8^{F}
Salinee Srisombat (THA)	0
Mun Hyon-gyong (PRK)	4
Yukako Kawai (JPN)	5

Final
Aisuluu Tynybekova (KGZ)	8
Yukako Kawai (JPN)	6

Repechage round 1
Choi Ji-ae (KOR)	0
Sakshi Malik (IND)	11

Bronze medals
Nabira Esenbaeva (UZB)	10
Salinee Srisombat (THA)	0
Sakshi Malik (IND)	9
Mun Hyon-gyong (PRK)	6

=== 65 kg ===
26 April

Quarterfinals		Semifinals		Final
Navjot Kaur (IND)	1
Luo Xiaojuan (CHN)	12	Luo Xiaojuan (CHN)	10^{F}
Aina Temirtassova (KAZ)	13	Aina Temirtassova (KAZ)	1
Nguyễn Thị Vinh (VIE)	2			Luo Xiaojuan (CHN)	3
Sakhipjamal Aleuatdinova (UZB)	0			Naomi Ruike (JPN)	0
Naomi Ruike (JPN)	10	Naomi Ruike (JPN)	11
Choi Se-eun (KOR)	4	Zorigtyn Bolortungalag (MGL)	0
Zorigtyn Bolortungalag (MGL)	9^{F}

Bronze medals
Navjot Kaur (IND)	0
Aina Temirtassova (KAZ)	7
Sakhipjamal Aleuatdinova (UZB)	0
Zorigtyn Bolortungalag (MGL)	7^{F}

=== 68 kg ===
25 April

Round of 16
Jeong Eun-sun (KOR)	10
Chen Wen-ling (TPE)	4
Irina Kazyulina (KAZ)	0
Sara Dosho (JPN)	10

Quarterfinals
Nguyễn Hồng Thúy (VIE)	0
Divya Kakran (IND)	10
Zhou Feng (CHN)	10
Soronzonboldyn Battsetseg (MGL)	2
Meerim Zhumanazarova (KGZ)	8
Bakhtigul Baltaniyazova (UZB)	2
Jeong Eun-sun (KOR)	2
Sara Dosho (JPN)	9^{F}

Semifinals
Divya Kakran (IND)	4
Zhou Feng (CHN)	14
Meerim Zhumanazarova (KGZ)	0
Sara Dosho (JPN)	3

Final
Zhou Feng (CHN)	2
Sara Dosho (JPN)	3

Repechage round 1
Irina Kazyulina (KAZ)	3^{F}
Jeong Eun-sun (KOR)	4

Bronze medals
Soronzonboldyn Battsetseg (MGL)	0
Divya Kakran (IND)	4^{F}
Irina Kazyulina (KAZ)	0
Meerim Zhumanazarova (KGZ)	10

=== 72 kg ===
26 April

Quarterfinals		Semifinals		Final
Ganbatyn Ariunjargal (MGL)	6
Nilufar Gadaeva (UZB)	4^{F}	Nilufar Gadaeva (UZB)	2
Li Chia-hsin (TPE)	0	Jeong Seo-yeon (KOR)	12
Jeong Seo-yeon (KOR)	12			Jeong Seo-yeon (KOR)	1
Wang Juan (CHN)	1			Yuka Kagami (JPN)	12
Yuka Kagami (JPN)	2	Yuka Kagami (JPN)	2
Zhamila Bakbergenova (KAZ)	7	Zhamila Bakbergenova (KAZ)	2
Kiran Bishnoi (IND)	4

Bronze medals
Li Chia-hsin (TPE)	0
Nilufar Gadaeva (UZB)	10
Wang Juan (CHN)	6
Zhamila Bakbergenova (KAZ)	13

=== 76 kg ===
25 April

Round of 16
Hiroe Minagawa (JPN)	10
Hwang Eun-ju (KOR)	0

Quarterfinals
Chang Hui-tsz (TPE)	2
Paliha (CHN)	6
Pooja Sihag (IND)	3
Naigalsürengiin Zagardulam (MGL)	14
Aiperi Medet Kyzy (KGZ)	6
Gulmaral Yerkebayeva (KAZ)	5
Shakhribonu Ellieva (UZB)	0
Hiroe Minagawa (JPN)	10

Semifinals
Paliha (CHN)	10
Naigalsürengiin Zagardulam (MGL)	0
Aiperi Medet Kyzy (KGZ)	0
Hiroe Minagawa (JPN)	2^{F}

Final
Paliha (CHN)	2
Hiroe Minagawa (JPN)	1

Repechage round 1
Hwang Eun-ju (KOR)	7
Shakhribonu Ellieva (UZB)	2

Bronze medals
Chang Hui-tsz (TPE)	14
Naigalsürengiin Zagardulam (MGL)	3
Hwang Eun-ju (KOR)	9
Aiperi Medet Kyzy (KGZ)	1
