= 2016 Asian Wrestling Olympic Qualification Tournament =

Wrestling competition held in Astana, Kazakhstan

- Host city: Astana, Kazakhstan
- Dates: 18–20 March 2016

The 2016 Olympic Wrestling Asian Qualification Tournament was the second regional qualifying tournament for the 2016 Summer Olympics The competition was held from 18 to 20 March 2016 in Astana, Kazakhstan.

The top two wrestlers in each weight class earned a qualification spot for their nations.

== Men's freestyle ==
=== 57 kg ===
18 March

Quarterfinals		Semifinals		Final
Rahul Aware (IND)	16
Hikmatullo Vohidov (TJK)	8	Rahul Aware (IND)	0
Berdi Atabaýew (TKM)	0	Rei Higuchi (JPN)	10
Rei Higuchi (JPN)	10			Rei Higuchi (JPN)	4
Li Liang (CHN)	2			Yun Jun-sik (KOR)	0
Yun Jun-sik (KOR)	10	Yun Jun-sik (KOR)	9
Nodirjon Safarov (UZB)	2	Samat Nadyrbek Uulu (KGZ)	8
Samat Nadyrbek Uulu (KGZ)	5

Bronze medals
Berdi Atabaýew (TKM)	0
Rahul Aware (IND)	10
Li Liang (CHN)	0
Samat Nadyrbek Uulu (KGZ)	10

=== 65 kg ===
19 March

Round of 16
Abdulrahman Ibrahim (QAT)	0
Nguyễn Xuân Định (VIE)	10
Yogeshwar Dutt (IND)	8
Kim Ju-song (PRK)	1
Elaman Dogdurbek Uulu (KGZ)	4
Shogo Maeda (JPN)	10
Sodiqkhoja Ismoilov (TJK)	0
Yeerlanbieke Katai (CHN)	10
Meirzhan Ashirov (KAZ)	1
Adam Batirov (BRN)	7
Batyr Borjakow (TKM)	4^{F}
Saksit Janhom (THA)	2

Quarterfinals
Mohammed Waheed (IRQ)	4
Lee Seung-chul (KOR)	10
Nguyễn Xuân Định (VIE)	2
Yogeshwar Dutt (IND)	12^{F}
Shogo Maeda (JPN)	0
Yeerlanbieke Katai (CHN)	10
Adam Batirov (BRN)	11
Batyr Borjakow (TKM)	0

Semifinals
Lee Seung-chul (KOR)	0
Yogeshwar Dutt (IND)	7
Yeerlanbieke Katai (CHN)	6
Adam Batirov (BRN)	1

Final
Yogeshwar Dutt (IND)	WO
Yeerlanbieke Katai (CHN)

Repechage round 1
Kim Ju-song (PRK)	6
Nguyễn Xuân Định (VIE)	1
Sodiqkhoja Ismoilov (TJK)	2
Shogo Maeda (JPN)	5^{F}

Bronze medals
Kim Ju-song (PRK)	WO
Lee Seung-chul (KOR)
Shogo Maeda (JPN)	WO
Adam Batirov (BRN)

=== 74 kg ===
18 March

Round of 16
Sosuke Takatani (JPN)	8
Lee Yun-seok (KOR)	3
Döwletmyrat Orazgylyjow (TKM)	10
Cấn Tất Dự (VIE)	0

Quarterfinals
Galymzhan Usserbayev (KAZ)	8
Azamat Sufiev (TJK)	4
Ilgiz Dzhakypbekov (KGZ)	7
Ahmed Mohsin (IRQ)	3
Wu Wei (CHN)	0
Rashid Kurbanov (UZB)	7
Sosuke Takatani (JPN)	16
Döwletmyrat Orazgylyjow (TKM)	6

Semifinals
Galymzhan Usserbayev (KAZ)	6
Ilgiz Dzhakypbekov (KGZ)	4
Rashid Kurbanov (UZB)	2
Sosuke Takatani (JPN)	4

Final
Galymzhan Usserbayev (KAZ)	1
Sosuke Takatani (JPN)	0^{R}

Repechage round 1
~~Lee Yun-seok (KOR)~~
Döwletmyrat Orazgylyjow (TKM)	WO

Bronze medals
Azamat Sufiev (TJK)	3
Ilgiz Dzhakypbekov (KGZ)	1
Döwletmyrat Orazgylyjow (TKM)
Rashid Kurbanov (UZB)	WO

=== 86 kg ===
20 March

Round of 16
Aligadzhi Gamidgadzhiev (KGZ)	10
Ýusup Melejaýew (TKM)	0
Orgodolyn Üitümen (MGL)	11
Kim Gwan-uk (KOR)	0

Quarterfinals
Bakhodur Kadirov (TJK)	4
Shinya Matsumoto (JPN)	14
Umidjon Ismanov (UZB)	2
Aslan Kakhidze (KAZ)	12
Somveer Kadian (IND)	2^{F}
Bi Shengfeng (CHN)	8
Aligadzhi Gamidgadzhiev (KGZ)	0
Orgodolyn Üitümen (MGL)	10^{F}

Semifinals
Shinya Matsumoto (JPN)	3
Aslan Kakhidze (KAZ)	6
Somveer Kadian (IND)	0
Orgodolyn Üitümen (MGL)	10

Final
Aslan Kakhidze (KAZ)	5
Orgodolyn Üitümen (MGL)	7

Repechage round 1
Kim Gwan-uk (KOR)	WO
~~Aligadzhi Gamidgadzhiev (KGZ)~~

Bronze medals
Umidjon Ismanov (UZB)
Shinya Matsumoto (JPN)	WO
Kim Gwan-uk (KOR)	10
Somveer Kadian (IND)	0

=== 97 kg ===
19 March

Round of 16
Magomed Musaev (KGZ)	1
Takeshi Yamaguchi (JPN)	1
Ahmed Salah (IRQ)	0
Magomed Ibragimov (UZB)	10

Quarterfinals
Mamed Ibragimov (KAZ)	10
Rustam Iskandari (TJK)	0
Kim Jae-gang (KOR)	2
Dorjkhandyn Khüderbulga (MGL)	7
Satyawart Kadian (IND)	4
Zhang Xueyi (CHN)	2
Magomed Musaev (KGZ)	8
Magomed Ibragimov (UZB)	2

Semifinals
Mamed Ibragimov (KAZ)	4
Dorjkhandyn Khüderbulga (MGL)	4
Satyawart Kadian (IND)	3
Magomed Musaev (KGZ)	5

Final
Mamed Ibragimov (KAZ)	2
Magomed Musaev (KGZ)	3

Repechage round 1
Takeshi Yamaguchi (JPN)	WO
Magomed Ibragimov (UZB)

Bronze medals
Rustam Iskandari (TJK)	0
Dorjkhandyn Khüderbulga (MGL)	10
Takeshi Yamaguchi (JPN)	3
Satyawart Kadian (IND)	2

=== 125 kg ===
20 March

Round of 16
Raja Al-Karrad (SYR)	1
Daulet Shabanbay (KAZ)	12
Elnur Açylow (TKM)	0
Hitender Beniwal (IND)	6
Khasanboy Rakhimov (UZB)	0
Aiaal Lazarev (KGZ)	10

Quarterfinals
Deng Zhiwei (CHN)	4^{F}
Taiki Yamamoto (JPN)	0
Komeil Ghasemi (IRI)	11
Nam Kyung-jin (KOR)	0
Farkhod Anakulov (TJK)	0
Daulet Shabanbay (KAZ)	10
Hitender Beniwal (IND)	0
Aiaal Lazarev (KGZ)	5^{F}

Semifinals
Deng Zhiwei (CHN)	0
Komeil Ghasemi (IRI)	3^{F}
Daulet Shabanbay (KAZ)	10
Aiaal Lazarev (KGZ)	8

Final
Komeil Ghasemi (IRI)	11
Daulet Shabanbay (KAZ)	0

Repechage round 1
Raja Al-Karrad (SYR)	6
Farkhod Anakulov (TJK)	6^{F}

Bronze medals
Nam Kyung-jin (KOR)	1
Deng Zhiwei (CHN)	12
Farkhod Anakulov (TJK)	5
Aiaal Lazarev (KGZ)	10^{F}

== Men's Greco-Roman ==
=== 59 kg ===
18 March

Round of 16
Hamid Sourian (IRI)	4
Shinobu Ota (JPN)	7
Ruzador Dzhuganiev (TJK)	0
Firuz Tukhtaev (UZB)	8

Quarterfinals
Ravinder Singh (IND)	0
Wang Lumin (CHN)	7
Karrar Abbas (IRQ)	8
Ritisak Pravan (THA)	0
Kim Seung-hak (KOR)	8
Seýdylla Täzäýew (TKM)	0
Shinobu Ota (JPN)	8
Firuz Tukhtaev (UZB)	4

Semifinals
Wang Lumin (CHN)	10
Karrar Abbas (IRQ)	0
Kim Seung-hak (KOR)	2
Shinobu Ota (JPN)	10

Final
Wang Lumin (CHN)	9
Shinobu Ota (JPN)	7

Repechage round 1
Hamid Sourian (IRI)
Firuz Tukhtaev (UZB)	WO

Bronze medals
Ravinder Singh (IND)	6
Karrar Abbas (IRQ)	9
Firuz Tukhtaev (UZB)	3
Kim Seung-hak (KOR)	0

=== 66 kg ===
20 March

Round of 16
Didar Amannazarow (TKM)	0
Omid Norouzi (IRI)	8

Quarterfinals
Nurbek Kholmukhammatov (UZB)	6
Magomed Chuhalov (KAZ)	10
Tomohiro Inoue (JPN)	4
Pang Jin-chol (PRK)	0
Roman Tsarev (KGZ)	1
Ravinder Singh (IND)	2
Zheng Pan (CHN)	6
Omid Norouzi (IRI)	7

Semifinals
Magomed Chuhalov (KAZ)	1
Tomohiro Inoue (JPN)	2
Ravinder Singh (IND)	1
Omid Norouzi (IRI)	11

Final
Tomohiro Inoue (JPN)	3
Omid Norouzi (IRI)	3

Repechage round 1
Didar Amannazarow (TKM)	WO
Zheng Pan (CHN)

Bronze medals
Pang Jin-chol (PRK)	0
Magomed Chuhalov (KAZ)	8
Didar Amannazarow (TKM)	5
Ravinder Singh (IND)	10

=== 75 kg ===
19 March

Round of 16
Bakhit Sharif Badr (QAT)	0
Harpreet Singh Sandhu (IND)	8

Quarterfinals
Atabek Azisbekov (KGZ)	9
Rabbia Khalil (PLE)	0
Dilshod Turdiev (UZB)	9
Shohei Yabiku (JPN)	0
Yang Bin (CHN)	8
Şermet Permanow (TKM)	0
Kim Hyeon-woo (KOR)	4
Harpreet Singh Sandhu (IND)	0

Semifinals
Atabek Azisbekov (KGZ)	4
Dilshod Turdiev (UZB)	5
Yang Bin (CHN)	2
Kim Hyeon-woo (KOR)	4

Final
Dilshod Turdiev (UZB)	2
Kim Hyeon-woo (KOR)	12^{F}

Bronze medals
Shohei Yabiku (JPN)	0
Atabek Azisbekov (KGZ)	3
Harpreet Singh Sandhu (IND)	2
Yang Bin (CHN)	4

=== 85 kg ===
18 March

Quarterfinals		Semifinals		Final
Adil Ghazi (IRQ)	1
Azamat Kustubayev (KAZ)	10	Azamat Kustubayev (KAZ)	1
Thirayut Bunphet (THA)	0	Peng Fei (CHN)	2
Peng Fei (CHN)	8			Peng Fei (CHN)	6
Ravinder Khatri (IND)	0			Janarbek Kenjeev (KGZ)	2
Janarbek Kenjeev (KGZ)	2	Janarbek Kenjeev (KGZ)	8
Taichi Oka (JPN)	3	Taichi Oka (JPN)	0
Lee Se-yeol (KOR)	1

Bronze medals
Thirayut Bunphet (THA)	0
Azamat Kustubayev (KAZ)	8
Ravinder Khatri (IND)	6
Taichi Oka (JPN)	1

- Janarbek Kenjeev originally qualified for the Olympics, but was later disqualified for doping, giving the spot to Ravinder Khatri. Later that decision was reverted.

=== 98 kg ===
20 March

Round of 16
Uzur Dzhuzupbekov (KGZ)	6^{F}
An Chang-gun (KOR)	2
Jahongir Turdiev (UZB)	7
Norikatsu Saikawa (JPN)	5
Naouzat Saleh (SYR)	0
Xiao Di (CHN)	8

Quarterfinals
Ali Majeed (IRQ)	0
Margulan Assembekov (KAZ)	8
Arslan Saparmämmedow (TKM)	0
Hardeep Singh (IND)	9
Mohamed Abdelfatah (BRN)	5
Uzur Dzhuzupbekov (KGZ)	1
Jahongir Turdiev (UZB)	0
Xiao Di (CHN)	5

Semifinals
Margulan Assembekov (KAZ)	2
Hardeep Singh (IND)	11^{C}
Mohamed Abdelfatah (BRN)	4
Xiao Di (CHN)	8

Final
Hardeep Singh (IND)
Xiao Di (CHN)	WO

Repechage round 1
Naouzat Saleh (SYR)	4
Jahongir Turdiev (UZB)	8^{F}

Bronze medals
Arslan Saparmämmedow (TKM)	WO
Margulan Assembekov (KAZ)
Jahongir Turdiev (UZB)	WO
~~Mohamed Abdelfatah (BRN)~~

=== 130 kg ===
19 March

Round of 16
Naveen Sevlia (IND)	2
Murodjon Tuychiev (TJK)	2

Quarterfinals
Meng Qiang (CHN)	11
Kim Yong-min (KOR)	2
Nurmakhan Tinaliyev (KAZ)	4
Bashir Babajanzadeh (IRI)	1
Muminjon Abdullaev (UZB)	6^{F}
Arata Sonoda (JPN)	0
Murat Ramonov (KGZ)	8
Murodjon Tuychiev (TJK)	0

Semifinals
Meng Qiang (CHN)	1
Nurmakhan Tinaliyev (KAZ)	4
Muminjon Abdullaev (UZB)	0
Murat Ramonov (KGZ)	4

Final
Nurmakhan Tinaliyev (KAZ)	8
Murat Ramonov (KGZ)	0

Bronze medals
Bashir Babajanzadeh (IRI)	WO
Meng Qiang (CHN)
Murodjon Tuychiev (TJK)	0
Muminjon Abdullaev (UZB)	8

== Women's freestyle ==
=== 48 kg ===
20 March

Quarterfinals		Semifinals		Final
Vinesh Phogat (IND)	2^{F}
Wasana Junnoi (THA)	0	Vinesh Phogat (IND)	4
Dauletbike Yakhshimuratova (UZB)	0	Zhuldyz Eshimova (KAZ)	5
Zhuldyz Eshimova (KAZ)	10			Zhuldyz Eshimova (KAZ)	3
Vũ Thị Hằng (VIE)	10			Vũ Thị Hằng (VIE)	2
Lee Yu-mi (KOR)	3	Vũ Thị Hằng (VIE)	3
Erdenesükhiin Narangerel (MGL)	4	So Sim-hyang (PRK)	2
So Sim-hyang (PRK)	14

Bronze medals
Dauletbike Yakhshimuratova (UZB)	0
Vinesh Phogat (IND)	10
Lee Yu-mi (KOR)	7
So Sim-hyang (PRK)	2

=== 53 kg ===
18 March

Quarterfinals		Semifinals		Final
Zulfiya Yakhyarova (KAZ)	0
Babita Kumari (IND)	10	Babita Kumari (IND)	8
Lee Shin-hye (KOR)	3	Erdenechimegiin Sumiyaa (MGL)	15
Erdenechimegiin Sumiyaa (MGL)	14^{F}			Erdenechimegiin Sumiyaa (MGL)	8
Nguyễn Thị Lụa (VIE)	14			Nguyễn Thị Lụa (VIE)	2
Chiu Hsin-ju (TPE)	4	Nguyễn Thị Lụa (VIE)	4^{F}
Aizharkyn Zhenishbek Kyzy (KGZ)	0	Zukhra Mustanova (UZB)	5
Zukhra Mustanova (UZB)	12

Bronze medals
Lee Shin-hye (KOR)	4
Babita Kumari (IND)	4
Chiu Hsin-ju (TPE)	3
Zukhra Mustanova (UZB)	13

- Erdenechimegiin Sumiyaa originally qualified for the Olympics, but was later disqualified for doping, giving the spot to Babita Kumari. Later that decision was reverted.

=== 58 kg ===
19 March

Round of 16
Salomat Kuchimova (UZB)	0
Aisuluu Tynybekova (KGZ)	3^{F}

Quarterfinals
Aiyim Abdildina (KAZ)	2
Pürevdorjiin Orkhon (MGL)	15^{F}
Li Qian (CHN)	2
Sakshi Malik (IND)	8
Jong In-sun (PRK)	6^{F}
Choi Ji-ae (KOR)	0
Phạm Thị Loan (VIE)	0
Aisuluu Tynybekova (KGZ)	4^{F}

Semifinals
Pürevdorjiin Orkhon (MGL)	4^{F}
Sakshi Malik (IND)	0
Jong In-sun (PRK)	7
Aisuluu Tynybekova (KGZ)	7

Final
Pürevdorjiin Orkhon (MGL)	5
Aisuluu Tynybekova (KGZ)	10

Repechage round 1
Salomat Kuchimova (UZB)	0
Phạm Thị Loan (VIE)	10

Bronze medals
Aiyim Abdildina (KAZ)	5
Sakshi Malik (IND)	2
Phạm Thị Loan (VIE)	0
Jong In-sun (PRK)	10

=== 63 kg ===
20 March

Quarterfinals
Yekaterina Larionova (KAZ)	4^{F}
Nilufar Gadaeva (UZB)	0
Anita Sheoran (IND)	4
Seo Hee-jeong (KOR)	2

Semifinals
Kim Ran-mi (PRK)	0
Wang Xiaoqian (CHN)	11
Yekaterina Larionova (KAZ)	8
Anita Sheoran (IND)	2

Final
Wang Xiaoqian (CHN)	6
Yekaterina Larionova (KAZ)	2

Bronze medals
Bye
Kim Ran-mi (PRK)
Nilufar Gadaeva (UZB)	0
Anita Sheoran (IND)	10

=== 69 kg ===
18 March

Pos	Athlete	Pld	W	L	CP	TP	KAZ	TPE	IND	KOR	UZB
1	Elmira Syzdykova (KAZ)	4	4	0	14	21	—	2–0 Fall	8–1 Fall	4–0	7–0
2	Chen Wen-ling (TPE)	4	3	1	9	16	0–4 VT	—	4–0	7–4	5–0
3	Navjot Kaur (IND)	4	2	2	8	13	0–4 VT	0–3 PO	—	4–7 Fall	8–0 Fall
4	Jeong Eun-sun (KOR)	4	1	3	4	20	0–3 PO	1–3 PP	0–4 VT	—	9–2
5	Bakhtigul Baltaniyazova (UZB)	4	0	4	1	2	0–3 PO	0–3 PO	0–4 VT	1–3 PP	—

Source: UWW

=== 75 kg ===
19 March

Quarterfinals		Semifinals		Final
		Chang Hui-tsz (TPE)	0
Kiran Bishnoi (IND)	0	Guzel Manyurova (KAZ)	10
Guzel Manyurova (KAZ)	6^{F}			Guzel Manyurova (KAZ)	1
Lalakhan Orinbaeva (UZB)	0			Rio Watari (JPN)	2
Badrakhyn Odonchimeg (MGL)	7^{F}	Badrakhyn Odonchimeg (MGL)	2
Rio Watari (JPN)	10	Rio Watari (JPN)	5
Park Chae-rin (KOR)	0

Bronze medals
Kiran Bishnoi (IND)	5
Chang Hui-tsz (TPE)	7
Park Chae-rin (KOR)	0
Badrakhyn Odonchimeg (MGL)	7^{F}
