= 2018 World Junior Wrestling Championships =

International Junior Wrestling Tournament

- Host city: Trnava, Slovakia
- Dates: 17–23 September 2018

Champions
- Freestyle: Russia
- Greco-Roman: Iran
- Women: Japan

The 2018 World Junior Wrestling Championships were the 42nd edition of the World Junior Wrestling Championships and were held in Trnava, Slovakia between 17 and 23 September 2018.

== Medal table ==
Rank	Nation	Gold	Silver	Bronze	Total
1	Russia	8	3	11	22
2	Japan	7	1	4	12
3	Iran	5	1	3	9
4	Turkey	2	0	3	5
5	United States	1	4	3	8
6	Armenia	1	2	2	5
7	Azerbaijan	1	1	3	5
8	China	1	1	2	4
9	Moldova	1	0	3	4
10	Kyrgyzstan	1	0	1	2
11	Finland	1	0	0	1
11	France	1	0	0	1
13	India	0	4	3	7
14	Uzbekistan	0	3	1	4
15	Mongolia	0	2	2	4
16	Georgia	0	2	1	3
17	Kazakhstan	0	1	3	4
18	Germany	0	1	1	2
19	Austria	0	1	0	1
19	Canada	0	1	0	1
19	Egypt	0	1	0	1
19	Switzerland	0	1	0	1
23	Ukraine	0	0	6	6
24	Hungary	0	0	4	4
25	Sweden	0	0	2	2
26	Italy	0	0	1	1
26	Norway	0	0	1	1
Totals (27 entries)		30	30	60	120

== Team ranking ==
Rank	Men's freestyle		Men's Greco-Roman		Women's freestyle	
Rank	Team	Points	Team	Points	Team	Points
1	Russia	182	Iran	136	Japan	215
2	United States	113	Russia	131	Russia	160
3	Iran	98	Armenia	83	China	127
4	Azerbaijan	91	Turkey	79	Ukraine	73
5	India	86	India	73	Mongolia	67

== Medal summary ==
=== Men's freestyle ===
Event	Gold	Silver	Bronze
57 kg	(Russia) Akhmed Idrisov	(India) Naveen Sihag	(United States) Daton Fix
57 kg	(Russia) Akhmed Idrisov	(India) Naveen Sihag	(Armenia) Arsen Harutyunyan
61 kg	(Russia) Abasgadzhi Magomedov	(Georgia (country)) Ramaz Turmanidze	(Armenia) Vazgen Tevanyan
61 kg	(Russia) Abasgadzhi Magomedov	(Georgia (country)) Ramaz Turmanidze	(Kazakhstan) Syrbaz Talgat
65 kg	(Russia) Saiyn Kazyryk	(Iran) Amir Hossein Maghsoudi	(Moldova) Nicolai Grahmez
65 kg	(Russia) Saiyn Kazyryk	(Iran) Amir Hossein Maghsoudi	(Ukraine) Erik Arushanian
70 kg	(Azerbaijan) Khadzhimurad Gadzhiyev	(Russia) Razambek Zhamalov	(United States) Brady Berge
70 kg	(Azerbaijan) Khadzhimurad Gadzhiyev	(Russia) Razambek Zhamalov	(Moldova) Vasile Diacon
74 kg	(United States) Mekhi Lewis	(Azerbaijan) Abubakr Abakarov	(Russia) Devid Betanov
74 kg	(United States) Mekhi Lewis	(Azerbaijan) Abubakr Abakarov	(Mongolia) Byambasürengiin Bat-Erdene
79 kg	(Japan) Hayato Ishiguro	(United States) Aaron Brooks	(Ukraine) Adlan Bataev
79 kg	(Japan) Hayato Ishiguro	(United States) Aaron Brooks	(Azerbaijan) Orkhan Abasov
86 kg	(Turkey) Arif Özen	(India) Deepak Punia	(Iran) Abolfazl Hashemi
86 kg	(Turkey) Arif Özen	(India) Deepak Punia	(Hungary) Patrik Szurovszki
92 kg	(Iran) Abbas Foroutan	(Kazakhstan) Alisher Yergali	(Azerbaijan) Askhab Hamzatov
92 kg	(Iran) Abbas Foroutan	(Kazakhstan) Alisher Yergali	(Turkey) Erhan Yaylacı
97 kg	(Russia) Magomedkhan Magomedov	(United States) Zachery Elam	(Georgia (country)) Zuriko Urtashvili
97 kg	(Russia) Magomedkhan Magomedov	(United States) Zachery Elam	(Kazakhstan) Serik Bakytkhanov
125 kg	(Russia) Soslan Khinchagov	(Canada) Aly Barghout	(Uzbekistan) Khasanboy Rakhimov
125 kg	(Russia) Soslan Khinchagov	(Canada) Aly Barghout	(Moldova) Samhan Jabrailov

=== Men's Greco-Roman ===
Event	Gold	Silver	Bronze
55 kg	(Iran) Pouya Nasserpour	(Armenia) Tigran Minasyan	(Russia) Emin Sefershaev
55 kg	(Iran) Pouya Nasserpour	(Armenia) Tigran Minasyan	(India) Vijay Vijay
60 kg	(Turkey) Kerem Kamal	(India) Vijay Vijay	(Japan) Kazuki Yabe
60 kg	(Turkey) Kerem Kamal	(India) Vijay Vijay	(Iran) Alireza Nejati
63 kg	(Kyrgyzstan) Erbol Bakirov	(Egypt) Hassan Mohamed	(Russia) Azamat Kairov
63 kg	(Kyrgyzstan) Erbol Bakirov	(Egypt) Hassan Mohamed	(Hungary) Krisztián Váncza
67 kg	(Armenia) Malkhas Amoyan	(Uzbekistan) Makhmud Bakhshilloev	(Iran) Yousef Hosseinvand
67 kg	(Armenia) Malkhas Amoyan	(Uzbekistan) Makhmud Bakhshilloev	(Ukraine) Parviz Nasibov
72 kg	(Iran) Amin Kavianinejad	(Georgia (country)) Nikoloz Tchikaidze	(Turkey) Erkan Ergen
72 kg	(Iran) Amin Kavianinejad	(Georgia (country)) Nikoloz Tchikaidze	(Russia) Magomed Yarbilov
77 kg	(Russia) Islam Opiev	(India) Sajan Bhanwal	(Kyrgyzstan) Akzhol Makhmudov
77 kg	(Russia) Islam Opiev	(India) Sajan Bhanwal	(Norway) Per-Anders Kure
82 kg	(Russia) Aleksandr Komarov	(United States) Andrew Berreyesa	(Hungary) István Takács
82 kg	(Russia) Aleksandr Komarov	(United States) Andrew Berreyesa	(Turkey) Muhittin Sarıçiçek
87 kg	(Iran) Mohammad Hadi Saravi	(Switzerland) Ramon Betschart	(Russia) Ilya Ermolenko
87 kg	(Iran) Mohammad Hadi Saravi	(Switzerland) Ramon Betschart	(Azerbaijan) Nazarshah Fatullayev
97 kg	(Finland) Arvi Savolainen	(Austria) Markus Ragginger	(Russia) Artur Sargsian
97 kg	(Finland) Arvi Savolainen	(Austria) Markus Ragginger	(Hungary) Bálint Vátzi
130 kg	(Iran) Amin Mirzazadeh	(Armenia) David Ovasapyan	(Germany) Franz Richter
130 kg	(Iran) Amin Mirzazadeh	(Armenia) David Ovasapyan	(United States) Cohlton Schultz

=== Women's freestyle ===
Event	Gold	Silver	Bronze
50 kg	(Japan) Yui Susaki	(Germany) Ellen Riesterer	(Kazakhstan) Marina Zakshevskaya
50 kg	(Japan) Yui Susaki	(Germany) Ellen Riesterer	(Russia) Veronika Gurskaya
53 kg	(Japan) Umi Imai	(Uzbekistan) Aktenge Keunimjaeva	(Mongolia) Batbaataryn Enkhtsetseg
53 kg	(Japan) Umi Imai	(Uzbekistan) Aktenge Keunimjaeva	(Russia) Mariia Tiumerekova
55 kg	(Japan) Saki Igarashi	(Mongolia) Bayaraagiin Khaliunaa	(Russia) Ekaterina Verbina
55 kg	(Japan) Saki Igarashi	(Mongolia) Bayaraagiin Khaliunaa	(China) Hou Jiajing
57 kg	(Japan) Andoriahanako Sawa	(China) Zhang Qi	(Sweden) Sara Lindborg
57 kg	(Japan) Andoriahanako Sawa	(China) Zhang Qi	(India) Mansi Ahlawat
59 kg	(Moldova) Anastasia Nichita	(Japan) Sae Nanjo	(Ukraine) Tetiana Rizhko
59 kg	(Moldova) Anastasia Nichita	(Japan) Sae Nanjo	(India) Anshu Malik
62 kg	(Japan) Atena Kodama	(Uzbekistan) Nabira Esenbaeva	(Italy) Aurora Campagna
62 kg	(Japan) Atena Kodama	(Uzbekistan) Nabira Esenbaeva	(Russia) Daria Bobrulko
65 kg	(Japan) Miyu Imai	(Mongolia) Enkhsaikhany Delgermaa	(Ukraine) Iryna Koliadenko
65 kg	(Japan) Miyu Imai	(Mongolia) Enkhsaikhany Delgermaa	(Russia) Albina Khripkova
68 kg	(Russia) Khanum Velieva	(United States) Macey Kilty	(Japan) Miwa Morikawa
68 kg	(Russia) Khanum Velieva	(United States) Macey Kilty	(Ukraine) Alina Levytska
72 kg	(France) Koumba Larroque	(Russia) Evgeniya Zakharchenko	(China) Shen Fanwen
72 kg	(France) Koumba Larroque	(Russia) Evgeniya Zakharchenko	(Japan) Naruha Matsuyuki
76 kg	(China) Huang Yuanyuan	(Russia) Elmira Khalaeva	(Japan) Yasuha Matsuyuki
76 kg	(China) Huang Yuanyuan	(Russia) Elmira Khalaeva	(Sweden) Denise Makota Ström

Preceded by 2017 Tampere	World Junior Wrestling Championships; 2018	Succeeded by 2019 Tallinn
