= Irina Kazyulina =

Kazakhstani female freestyle wrestler

Personal information
- Native name: Ирина Казюлина

Sport
- Country: Kazakhstan
- Sport: Wrestling
- Weight class: 68 kg
- Event: Freestyle wrestling
Medal record
Women's freestyle wrestling
Representing Kazakhstan
Asian Championships
| Bronze medal – third place | 2018 Bishkek | 68 kg |
Islamic Solidarity Games
| Bronze medal – third place | 2025 Riyadh | 68 kg |

Irina Kazyulina (Russian: Ирина Казюлина) is a Kazakhstani freestyle wrestler. She won the bronze medal at the 2018 Asian Wrestling Championships.
