= Amin Taheri =

Iranian freestyle wrestler (born 1995)

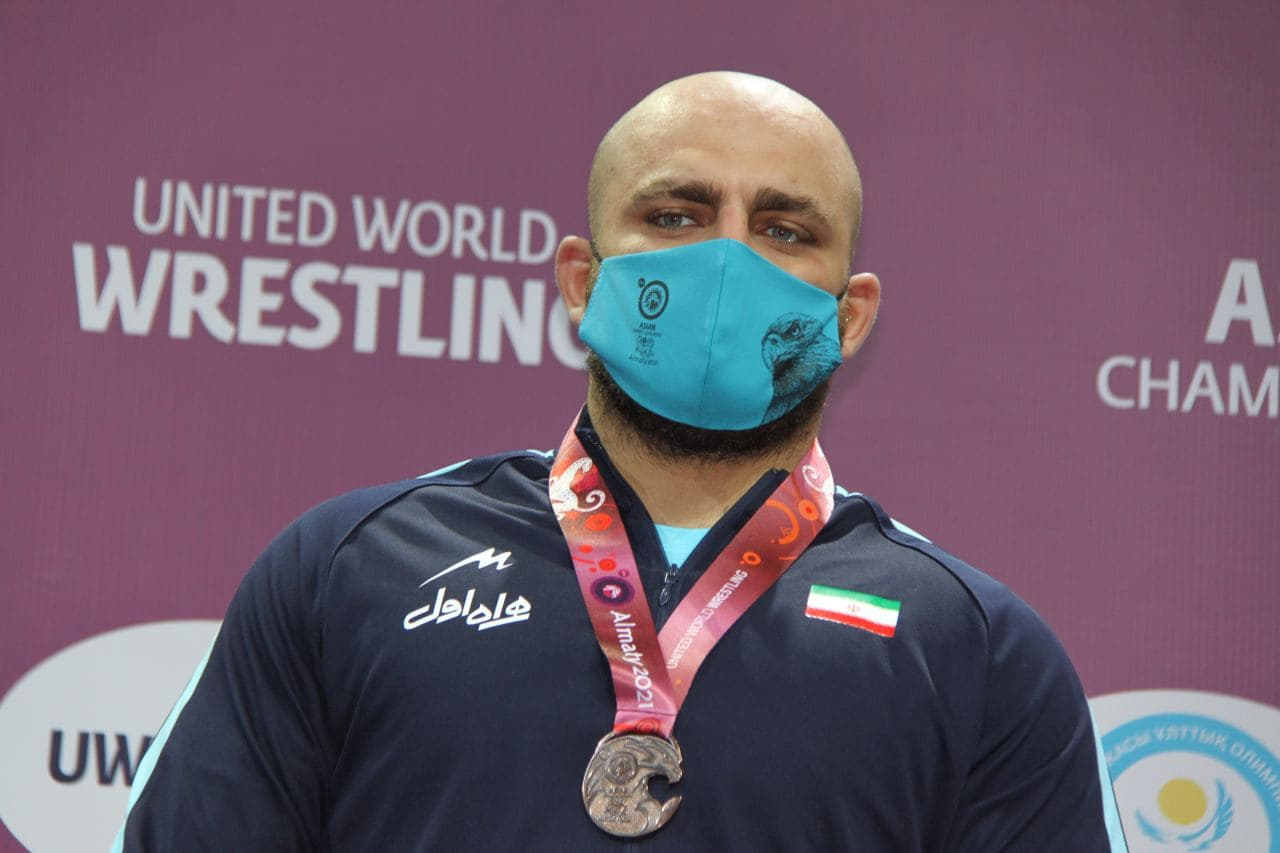
- Taheri at the Asian Championships, Almaty, 2021

Personal information
- Born: 26 June 1995 (age 31) Tehran, Iran
- Height: 1.89 m (6 ft 2 in)
- Website: instagram.com/Amin_thr

Sport
- Country: Iran
- Sport: Freestyle wrestling
- Coached by: Alireza Rezaei
Medal record
Representing Iran
Asian Championships
Bronze medal – third place	2018 Bishkek	125 kg
Bronze medal – third place	2021 Almaty	125 kg
Dan Kolov & Nikola Petrov Tournament
Gold medal – first place	2021 Plovdiv	125 kg
Grand Prix
Silver medal – second place	2017 Madrid	125 kg
Silver medal – second place	2020 Kermanshah	125 kg
Silver medal – second place	2023 Erevan	125 kg
Bronze medal – third place	2015 Kermanshah	125 kg
Bronze medal – third place	2016 Tehran	80 kg
Bronze medal – third place	2019 Kermanshah	125 kg
Bronze medal – third place	2023 Urmia	125 kg
U23 World Championships
Bronze medal – third place	2017 Bydgoszcz	125 kg
Bronze medal – third place	2018 Bucharest	125 kg
World Juniors Championships
Bronze medal – third place	2014 Croatia	125 kg
Silver medal – second place	2015 Brazil	125 kg
Asian Juniors Championships
Gold medal – first place	2015 New Delhi	125 kg
Gold medal – first place	2014 Mongolia	125 kg

Amin Taheri (Persian: امین طاهری, born 26 June 1995) is an Iranian freestyle wrestler. He won his first world title in Zagreb at the Junior Wrestling World Championships, where he won a bronze medal in 120 kg. In the same year he won gold in Asian Junior Wrestling Championships. Next year, 2015, he was able to score a silver medal in the same category at Junior world championships in Brazil. In 2017 and 2018, He was able to win two consecutive bronze medals in Under 23 world championships.

He won a bronze medal at the 2018 Asian Wrestling Championships. He was also a member of the Iranian team in 2019 Wrestling World Cup in which the team came in second.

He Has also attended Takhti international cup a few times, in which he has won two bronze medals in 2015 and 2019, and a silver in 2020.
