= Lee Seung-bong =

South Korean freestyle wrestler

Sport
- Country: South Korea
- Sport: Amateur wrestling
- Event: Freestyle
Medal record
Men's freestyle wrestling
Representing South Korea
Asian Championships
Silver medal – second place	2018 Bishkek	70 kg
Military World Games
Bronze medal – third place	2019 Wuhan	74 kg

Lee Seung-bong is a South Korean freestyle wrestler. He won the silver medal in the men's 70 kg event at the 2018 Asian Wrestling Championships held in Bishkek, Kyrgyzstan.

In 2019, he represented South Korea at the Military World Games held in Wuhan, China and he won one of the bronze medals in the men's freestyle 74 kg event.

He competed in the 74 kg event at the 2022 World Wrestling Championships held in Belgrade, Serbia.

== Achievements ==
Year	Tournament	Location	Result	Event
2018	Asian Wrestling Championships	Bishkek, Kyrgyzstan	2nd	Freestyle 70 kg
2019	Military World Games	Wuhan, China	3rd	Freestyle 74 kg
