= Kim Jin-hyeok =

South Korean Greco-Roman wrestler

Personal information
- Nationality: South Korea
- Born: 15 May 1989 (age 37) Gyeongsangbuk-do, South Korea
- Height: 1.76 m (5 ft 9 1/2 in)
- Weight: 74 kg (163 lb)

Sport
- Sport: Wrestling
- Event: Greco-Roman
- Club: Korea Minting and Security; Printing Corporation
- Coached by: Kim Jin-kyu
Medal record
Representing South Korea
Men's Greco-Roman wrestling
Asian Championships
Bronze medal – third place	2018 Bishkek	82 kg
Silver medal – second place	2011 Tashkent	74 kg
Military World Games
Gold medal – first place	2015 Mungyeong	75 kg

Kim Jin-hyeok (Korean: 김진혁; born 15 May 1989 in Gyeongsangbuk-do) is an amateur South Korean Greco-Roman wrestler, who competes in the men's middleweight category. Kim represented South Korea at the 2012 Summer Olympics in London, where he competed in the men's 74 kg class. Unfortunately, he lost his qualifying round match to Georgia's Zurabi Datunashvili, who was able to score six points in two straight periods, leaving Kim without a single point.

He competed in the 87 kg event at the 2022 World Wrestling Championships held in Belgrade, Serbia.
