= Ilkhom Bakhromov =

Uzbekistani Greco-Roman wrestler

Personal information
- Born: 7 January 1997 (age 29)

Sport
- Country: Uzbekistan
- Sport: Amateur wrestling
- Weight class: 55 kg
- Event: Greco-Roman
Medal record
Men's Greco-Roman wrestling
Representing Uzbekistan
Asian Championships
Gold medal – first place	2019 Xi'an	55 kg
Silver medal – second place	2021 Almaty	55 kg
Summer Youth Olympics
Gold medal – first place	2014 Nanjing	50 kg

Ilkhom Bakhromov (born 7 January 1997) is an Uzbekistani Greco-Roman wrestler. He won the gold medal in the men's 55 kg event at the 2019 Asian Wrestling Championships held in Xi'an, China.

In 2014, Bakhromov won the gold medal in the men's 50 kg event at the Summer Youth Olympics held in Nanjing, China. In 2021, he won the silver medal in the 55 kg event at the Grand Prix Zagreb Open held in Zagreb, Croatia.

He lost his bronze medal match at the 2024 Asian Wrestling Championships held in Bishkek, Kyrgyzstan.

== Achievements ==
Year	Tournament	Location	Result	Event
2014	Summer Youth Olympics	Nanjing, China	1st	Greco-Roman 50 kg
2019	Asian Championships	Xi'an, China	1st	Greco-Roman 55 kg
2021	Asian Championships	Almaty, Kazakhstan	2nd	Greco-Roman 55 kg
