= 2019 Asian Wrestling Championships =

- Host city: Xi'an, China
- Dates: 23–28 April 2019
- Stadium: Xidian University Gymnasium

Champions
- Freestyle: Iran
- Greco-Roman: Iran
- Women: Japan

The 2019 Asian Wrestling Championships was held in Xi'an, China. The event took place from April 23 to April 28, 2019.

== Medal table ==
Rank	Nation	Gold	Silver	Bronze	Total
1	Iran	11	0	6	17
2	China	5	5	6	16
3	Japan	4	7	6	17
4	Uzbekistan	2	3	5	10
5	Kazakhstan	2	2	12	16
6	Kyrgyzstan	2	1	5	8
7	South Korea	2	1	3	6
8	India	1	6	9	16
9	North Korea	1	3	2	6
10	Mongolia	0	2	4	6
11	Bahrain	0	0	1	1
11	Chinese Taipei	0	0	1	1
Totals (12 entries)		30	30	60	120

== Team ranking ==
Rank	Men's freestyle		Men's Greco-Roman		Women's freestyle	
Rank	Team	Points	Team	Points	Team	Points
1	Iran	220	Iran	165	Japan	215
2	India	155	Uzbekistan	163	China	183
3	Kazakhstan	129	Kazakhstan	134	India	113
4	China	104	China	124	Mongolia	107
5	Japan	103	South Korea	121	Kazakhstan	102
6	Kyrgyzstan	87	India	111	South Korea	95
7	South Korea	70	Japan	104	Uzbekistan	77
8	Uzbekistan	59	Kyrgyzstan	100	North Korea	70
9	Mongolia	57	North Korea	26	Kyrgyzstan	56
10	Tajikistan	50	Tajikistan	20	Vietnam	44

== Medal summary ==
=== Men's freestyle ===
Event	Gold	Silver	Bronze
57 kg	Reza Atri; Iran	Kang Kum-song; North Korea	Makhmudjon Shavkatov; Uzbekistan
57 kg	Reza Atri; Iran	Kang Kum-song; North Korea	Yuki Takahashi; Japan
61 kg	Behnam Ehsanpour; Iran	Liu Minghu; China	Yudai Fujita; Japan
61 kg	Behnam Ehsanpour; Iran	Liu Minghu; China	Rahul Aware; India
65 kg	Bajrang Punia; India	Sayatbek Okassov; Kazakhstan	Kim Han-song; North Korea
65 kg	Bajrang Punia; India	Sayatbek Okassov; Kazakhstan	Peyman Biabani; Iran
70 kg	Nurkozha Kaipanov; Kazakhstan	Kojiro Shiga; Japan	Yuan Shaohua; China
70 kg	Nurkozha Kaipanov; Kazakhstan	Kojiro Shiga; Japan	Younes Emami; Iran
74 kg	Daniyar Kaisanov; Kazakhstan	Amit Kumar Dhankar; India	Adam Batirov; Bahrain
74 kg	Daniyar Kaisanov; Kazakhstan	Amit Kumar Dhankar; India	Mohammad Nokhodi; Iran
79 kg	Bahman Teymouri; Iran	Parveen Rana; India	Oibek Nasirov; Kyrgyzstan
79 kg	Bahman Teymouri; Iran	Parveen Rana; India	Galymzhan Usserbayev; Kazakhstan
86 kg	Kamran Ghasempour; Iran	Aligadzhi Gamidgadzhiev; Kyrgyzstan	Deepak Punia; India
86 kg	Kamran Ghasempour; Iran	Aligadzhi Gamidgadzhiev; Kyrgyzstan	Ganbaataryn Gankhuyag; Mongolia
92 kg	Alireza Karimi; Iran	Vicky Chahar; India	Sun Xiao; China
92 kg	Alireza Karimi; Iran	Vicky Chahar; India	Atsushi Matsumoto; Japan
97 kg	Reza Yazdani; Iran	Ölziisaikhany Batzul; Mongolia	Satyawart Kadian; India
97 kg	Reza Yazdani; Iran	Ölziisaikhany Batzul; Mongolia	Alisher Yergali; Kazakhstan
125 kg	Yadollah Mohebbi; Iran	Deng Zhiwei; China	Sumit Malik; India
125 kg	Yadollah Mohebbi; Iran	Deng Zhiwei; China	Kim Dong-hwan; South Korea

=== Men's Greco-Roman ===
Event	Gold	Silver	Bronze
55 kg	Ilkhom Bakhromov; Uzbekistan	Hiromu Katagiri; Japan	Asan Sulaimanov; Kyrgyzstan
55 kg	Ilkhom Bakhromov; Uzbekistan	Hiromu Katagiri; Japan	Khorlan Zhakansha; Kazakhstan
60 kg	Islomjon Bakhromov; Uzbekistan	Ri Se-ung; North Korea	Gyanender Dahiya; India
60 kg	Islomjon Bakhromov; Uzbekistan	Ri Se-ung; North Korea	Kenichiro Fumita; Japan
63 kg	Tuo Erbatu; China	Elmurat Tasmuradov; Uzbekistan	Jung Jin-woong; South Korea
63 kg	Tuo Erbatu; China	Elmurat Tasmuradov; Uzbekistan	Saman Abdevali; Iran
67 kg	Ryu Han-su; South Korea	Meirzhan Shermakhanbet; Kazakhstan	Zhang Gaoquan; China
67 kg	Ryu Han-su; South Korea	Meirzhan Shermakhanbet; Kazakhstan	Shogo Takahashi; Japan
72 kg	Mohammad Reza Geraei; Iran	Zhang Hujun; China	Ruslan Tsarev; Kyrgyzstan
72 kg	Mohammad Reza Geraei; Iran	Zhang Hujun; China	Demeu Zhadrayev; Kazakhstan
77 kg	Kim Hyeon-woo; South Korea	Gurpreet Singh; India	Tamerlan Shadukayev; Kazakhstan
77 kg	Kim Hyeon-woo; South Korea	Gurpreet Singh; India	Mohammad Ali Geraei; Iran
82 kg	Saeid Abdevali; Iran	Harpreet Singh Sandhu; India	Maxat Yerezhepov; Kazakhstan
82 kg	Saeid Abdevali; Iran	Harpreet Singh Sandhu; India	Qian Haitao; China
87 kg	Hossein Nouri; Iran	Sunil Kumar; India	Azamat Kustubayev; Kazakhstan
87 kg	Hossein Nouri; Iran	Sunil Kumar; India	Rustam Assakalov; Uzbekistan
97 kg	Uzur Dzhuzupbekov; Kyrgyzstan	Jahongir Turdiev; Uzbekistan	Xiao Di; China
97 kg	Uzur Dzhuzupbekov; Kyrgyzstan	Jahongir Turdiev; Uzbekistan	Mehdi Aliyari; Iran
130 kg	Amir Ghasemi Monjazi; Iran	Muminjon Abdullaev; Uzbekistan	Damir Kuzembayev; Kazakhstan
130 kg	Amir Ghasemi Monjazi; Iran	Muminjon Abdullaev; Uzbekistan	Murat Ramonov; Kyrgyzstan

=== Women's freestyle ===
Event	Gold	Silver	Bronze
50 kg	Yuki Irie; Japan	Sun Yanan; China	Valentina Islamova; Kazakhstan
50 kg	Yuki Irie; Japan	Sun Yanan; China	Hwang Yong-ok; North Korea
53 kg	Pak Yong-mi; North Korea	Mayu Mukaida; Japan	Aktenge Keunimjaeva; Uzbekistan
53 kg	Pak Yong-mi; North Korea	Mayu Mukaida; Japan	Vinesh Phogat; India
55 kg	Xie Mengyu; China	Saki Igarashi; Japan	Marina Sedneva; Kazakhstan
55 kg	Xie Mengyu; China	Saki Igarashi; Japan	Mönkhboldyn Dölgöön; Mongolia
57 kg	Rong Ningning; China	Jong Myong-suk; North Korea	Kaori Icho; Japan
57 kg	Rong Ningning; China	Jong Myong-suk; North Korea	Sükheegiin Tserenchimed; Mongolia
59 kg	Yuzuka Inagaki; Japan	Altantsetsegiin Battsetseg; Mongolia	Manju Kumari; India
59 kg	Yuzuka Inagaki; Japan	Altantsetsegiin Battsetseg; Mongolia	Zhang Qi; China
62 kg	Aisuluu Tynybekova; Kyrgyzstan	Yukako Kawai; Japan	Nabira Esenbaeva; Uzbekistan
62 kg	Aisuluu Tynybekova; Kyrgyzstan	Yukako Kawai; Japan	Sakshi Malik; India
65 kg	Luo Xiaojuan; China	Naomi Ruike; Japan	Aina Temirtassova; Kazakhstan
65 kg	Luo Xiaojuan; China	Naomi Ruike; Japan	Zorigtyn Bolortungalag; Mongolia
68 kg	Sara Dosho; Japan	Zhou Feng; China	Divya Kakran; India
68 kg	Sara Dosho; Japan	Zhou Feng; China	Meerim Zhumanazarova; Kyrgyzstan
72 kg	Yuka Kagami; Japan	Jeong Seo-yeon; South Korea	Nilufar Gadaeva; Uzbekistan
72 kg	Yuka Kagami; Japan	Jeong Seo-yeon; South Korea	Zhamila Bakbergenova; Kazakhstan
76 kg	Paliha; China	Hiroe Minagawa; Japan	Chang Hui-tsz; Chinese Taipei
76 kg	Paliha; China	Hiroe Minagawa; Japan	Hwang Eun-ju; South Korea

== Participating nations ==
331 competitors from 26 nations competed.

- Bahrain (2)
- China (30)
- Chinese Taipei (12)
- Hong Kong (3)
- India (30)
- Iran (20)
- Iraq (3)
- Japan (30)
- Jordan (2)
- Kazakhstan (30)
- Kyrgyzstan (24)
- Lebanon (1)
- Mongolia (22)
- North Korea (9)
- Pakistan (1)
- Palestine (1)
- Qatar (2)
- Singapore (7)
- South Korea (30)
- Sri Lanka (3)
- Syria (2)
- Tajikistan (14)
- Thailand (4)
- Turkmenistan (12)
- Uzbekistan (29)
- Vietnam (8)
