= Roman Tsarev =

Kyrgyzstani sport wrestler

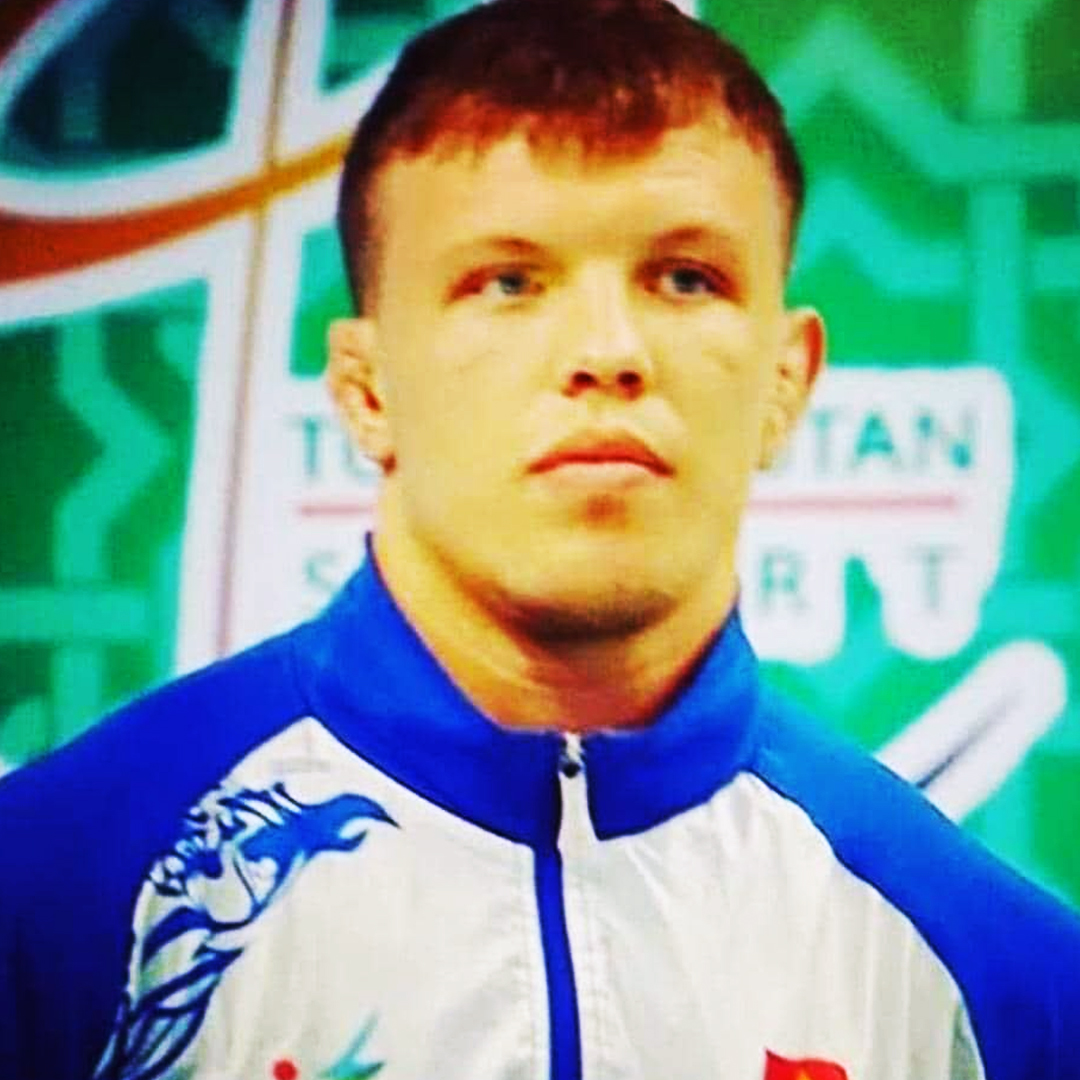

Personal information
- Full name: Roman Alimzhanovich Tsarev
- Nationality: Kyrgyzstani
- Born: 16 July 1991 (age 34) Taraz, Kazakh SSR, USSR
- Height: 173 cm (5 ft 8 in)
- Weight: 67–72 kg (148–159 lb)

Sport
- Country: Kyrgyzstan
- Sport: Greco-Roman wrestling Belt wrestling
- Club: Raatbek Sanatbaev's wrestling club Berkut
- Coached by: Farchad Ushurov, Shuhrat Ushurov
Medal record
Representing Kyrgyzstan
World Belt Wrestling Championships
Silver medal – second place	2016 Naberezhnye Chelny	75 kg
Asian Belt Wrestling Championships
Bronze medal – third place	2016 Ashgabat	75 kg

Roman Alimzhanovich Tsarev (born 16 July 1991) is a Kyrgyzstani Greco-Roman and Belt wrestler of Russian heritage. 2016 Belt Wrestling World Championships silver medalist. He competed at the 2011 Asian Wrestling Championships and 2018 Asian Wrestling Championships.

== Background ==
He was born in Taraz, USSR. As a child, he moved with his twin-brother Ruslan to Kyrgyzstan and started Greco-Roman and belt wrestling at the age of 13 in Bishkek.

== Sport career ==
He was placed at the 2007 Aleksandr Karelin Greco-Roman tournament in Barnaul, Russia. In 2013, he was second at the Kyrgyzstan national championships at 66 kg. In 2016, he competed in the belt wrestling 75kg event at the Asian Championships and won the bronze medal. At the 2016 World Belt Wrestling Championships he earned the silver medal. In 2017, he was runner-up at the Kyrgyzstan Greco-Roman national championships at 71 kilos. In 2020, he won the Kyrgyzstan Greco-Roman national championships.

== Achievements ==
- Greco-Roman:
  - 2013, 2017 Kyrgyzstani Championships — 2nd;
  - 2020 Kyrgyzstani Championships — 1st;
- Belt Wrestling:
  - 2016 Asian Championships — 3rd;
  - 2016 World Championships — 2nd;

== Personal life ==
Roman has a twin-brother Ruslan, who competes in Greco-Roman wrestling.
