= Jahongir Turdiev =

Uzbekistani sport wrestler (born 1993)

Aram Vardanyan
Personal information
- Nationality: (Uzbekistan) Uzbekistani
- Born: 5 June 1993 (age 33)
- Weight: 97 kg (214 lb)

Sport
- Country: Uzbekistan
- Sport: Wrestling
- Event: Greco-Roman
Medal record
Men's Greco-Roman wrestling
Representing Uzbekistan
Asian Championships
Silver medal – second place	2019 Xi'an	97 kg

Jahongir Turdiev (born 5 June 1993) is an Uzbek sport wrestler, who competes in the men's Greco Roman category. He claimed silver medal in the men's 97 kg event during the 2019 Asian Wrestling Championships after losing to Uzur Dzhuzupbekov of Kyrgyzstan.
