= 2018 Asian Wrestling Championships =

- Host city: Bishkek, Kyrgyzstan
- Dates: 27 February – 4 March 2018
- Stadium: Kojomkul Sports Palace

Champions
- Freestyle: Uzbekistan
- Greco-Roman: Kazakhstan
- Women: China

The 2018 Asian Wrestling Championships took place at the Kojomkul Sports Palace, Bishkek in Kyrgyzstan. The event took place from February 27 to March 4, 2018.

== Medal table ==
Rank	Nation	Gold	Silver	Bronze	Total
1	China	7	1	6	14
2	Uzbekistan	5	4	6	15
3	Iran	5	2	2	9
4	Kazakhstan	4	3	10	17
5	Japan	3	7	8	18
6	Kyrgyzstan	2	3	6	11
7	North Korea	2	1	0	3
8	Mongolia	1	5	6	12
9	India	1	1	6	8
10	South Korea	0	2	6	8
11	Qatar	0	1	0	1
12	Iraq	0	0	1	1
12	Turkmenistan	0	0	1	1
Totals (13 entries)		30	30	58	118

== Team ranking ==
Rank	Men's freestyle		Men's Greco-Roman		Women's freestyle	
Rank	Team	Points	Team	Points	Team	Points
1	Uzbekistan	178	Kazakhstan	161	China	185
2	Iran	157	Kyrgyzstan	157	Mongolia	167
3	Kazakhstan	146	Uzbekistan	154	Japan	161
4	Mongolia	110	Japan	143	India	119
5	Japan	105	China	118	South Korea	109
6	South Korea	97	Iran	104	Kazakhstan	101
7	Kyrgyzstan	76	India	95	Uzbekistan	92
8	India	66	South Korea	70	North Korea	39
9	China	60	Tajikistan	40	Kyrgyzstan	35
10	Turkmenistan	42	Turkmenistan	25	Vietnam	34

== Medal summary ==
=== Men's freestyle ===
Event	Gold	Silver	Bronze
57 kg	Kang Kum-song; North Korea	Makhmudjon Shavkatov; Uzbekistan	Zhandos Ismailov; Kazakhstan
57 kg	Kang Kum-song; North Korea	Makhmudjon Shavkatov; Uzbekistan	Toshihiro Hasegawa; Japan
61 kg	Nurislam Sanayev; Kazakhstan	Kazuya Koyanagi; Japan	Abbos Rakhmonov; Uzbekistan
61 kg	Nurislam Sanayev; Kazakhstan	Kazuya Koyanagi; Japan	Ulukbek Zholdoshbekov; Kyrgyzstan
65 kg	Daulet Niyazbekov; Kazakhstan	Daichi Takatani; Japan	Bajrang Punia; India
65 kg	Daulet Niyazbekov; Kazakhstan	Daichi Takatani; Japan	Temurjon Usmonohunov; Uzbekistan
70 kg	Ikhtiyor Navruzov; Uzbekistan	Lee Seung-bong; South Korea	Vinod Kumar Omprakash; India
70 kg	Ikhtiyor Navruzov; Uzbekistan	Lee Seung-bong; South Korea	Meirzhan Ashirov; Kazakhstan
74 kg	Muslim Evloev; Kyrgyzstan	Ganzorigiin Mandakhnaran; Mongolia	Daniyar Kaisanov; Kazakhstan
74 kg	Muslim Evloev; Kyrgyzstan	Ganzorigiin Mandakhnaran; Mongolia	Mostafa Hosseinkhani; Iran
79 kg	Ezzatollah Akbari; Iran	Rashid Kurbanov; Uzbekistan	Ganboldyn Törbold; Mongolia
79 kg	Ezzatollah Akbari; Iran	Rashid Kurbanov; Uzbekistan	Tsubasa Asai; Japan
86 kg	Hassan Yazdani; Iran	Orgodolyn Üitümen; Mongolia	Azamat Dauletbekov; Kazakhstan
86 kg	Hassan Yazdani; Iran	Orgodolyn Üitümen; Mongolia	Bi Shengfeng; China
92 kg	Mohammad Javad Ebrahimi; Iran	Adilet Davlumbayev; Kazakhstan	Lin Zushen; China
92 kg	Mohammad Javad Ebrahimi; Iran	Adilet Davlumbayev; Kazakhstan	Azizbek Soliev; Uzbekistan
97 kg	Magomed Ibragimov; Uzbekistan	Mojtaba Goleij; Iran	Kim Jae-gang; South Korea
97 kg	Magomed Ibragimov; Uzbekistan	Mojtaba Goleij; Iran	Takeshi Yamaguchi; Japan
125 kg	Davit Modzmanashvili; Uzbekistan	Giorgi Sakandelidze; Qatar	Amin Taheri; Iran
125 kg	Davit Modzmanashvili; Uzbekistan	Giorgi Sakandelidze; Qatar	Natsagsürengiin Zolboo; Mongolia

=== Men's Greco-Roman ===
Event	Gold	Silver	Bronze
55 kg	Shota Tanokura; Japan	Zholaman Sharshenbekov; Kyrgyzstan	Khorlan Zhakansha; Kazakhstan
55 kg	Shota Tanokura; Japan	Zholaman Sharshenbekov; Kyrgyzstan	Rajender Kumar; India
60 kg	Shinobu Ota; Japan	Ri Se-ung; North Korea	Kanybek Zholchubekov; Kyrgyzstan
60 kg	Shinobu Ota; Japan	Ri Se-ung; North Korea	Islomjon Bakhromov; Uzbekistan
63 kg	Elmurat Tasmuradov; Uzbekistan	Urmatbek Amatov; Kyrgyzstan	Meirambek Ainagulov; Kazakhstan
63 kg	Elmurat Tasmuradov; Uzbekistan	Urmatbek Amatov; Kyrgyzstan	Jung Do-kyung; South Korea
67 kg	Almat Kebispayev; Kazakhstan	Tsuchika Shimoyamada; Japan	Mirzobek Rakhmatov; Uzbekistan
67 kg	Almat Kebispayev; Kazakhstan	Tsuchika Shimoyamada; Japan	Zhang Gaoquan; China
72 kg	Akzhol Makhmudov; Kyrgyzstan	Demeu Zhadrayev; Kazakhstan	Aram Vardanyan; Uzbekistan
72 kg	Akzhol Makhmudov; Kyrgyzstan	Demeu Zhadrayev; Kazakhstan	Tomohiro Inoue; Japan
77 kg	Yang Bin; China	Mohammad Ali Geraei; Iran	Şermet Permanow; Turkmenistan
77 kg	Yang Bin; China	Mohammad Ali Geraei; Iran	Maxat Yerezhepov; Kazakhstan
82 kg	Askhat Dilmukhamedov; Kazakhstan	Atabek Azisbekov; Kyrgyzstan	Kim Jin-hyeok; South Korea
82 kg	Askhat Dilmukhamedov; Kazakhstan	Atabek Azisbekov; Kyrgyzstan	Harpreet Singh Sandhu; India
87 kg	Hossein Nouri; Iran	Masato Sumi; Japan	Peng Fei; China
87 kg	Hossein Nouri; Iran	Masato Sumi; Japan	Azat Beishebekov; Kyrgyzstan
97 kg	Rustam Assakalov; Uzbekistan	Yerulan Iskakov; Kazakhstan	Ali Majeed; Iraq
97 kg	Rustam Assakalov; Uzbekistan	Yerulan Iskakov; Kazakhstan	Uzur Dzhuzupbekov; Kyrgyzstan
130 kg	Behnam Mehdizadeh; Iran	Muminjon Abdullaev; Uzbekistan	Murat Ramonov; Kyrgyzstan
130 kg	Behnam Mehdizadeh; Iran	Muminjon Abdullaev; Uzbekistan	Nie Xiaoming; China

=== Women's freestyle ===
Event	Gold	Silver	Bronze
50 kg	Lei Chun; China	Vinesh Phogat; India	Erdenesükhiin Narangerel; Mongolia
50 kg	Lei Chun; China	Vinesh Phogat; India	Yuki Irie; Japan
53 kg	Pak Yong-mi; North Korea	Erdenechimegiin Sumiyaa; Mongolia	Yu Miyahara; Japan
53 kg	Pak Yong-mi; North Korea	Erdenechimegiin Sumiyaa; Mongolia	Zhuldyz Eshimova; Kazakhstan
55 kg	Saki Igarashi; Japan	Oh Hye-min; South Korea	Erkhembayaryn Davaachimeg; Mongolia
55 kg	Saki Igarashi; Japan	Oh Hye-min; South Korea	Luo Lannuan; China
57 kg	Pei Xingru; China	Sara Natami; Japan	Kim Ye-seul; South Korea
57 kg	Pei Xingru; China	Sara Natami; Japan	Altantsetsegiin Battsetseg; Mongolia
59 kg	Rong Ningning; China	Nabira Esenbaeva; Uzbekistan	Sangeeta Phogat; India
59 kg	Rong Ningning; China	Nabira Esenbaeva; Uzbekistan	Baatarjavyn Shoovdor; Mongolia
62 kg	Pürevdorjiin Orkhon; Mongolia	Luo Xiaojuan; China	Yurika Ito; Japan
62 kg	Pürevdorjiin Orkhon; Mongolia	Luo Xiaojuan; China	Sakshi Malik; India
65 kg	Navjot Kaur; India	Miyu Imai; Japan	Lee Han-bit; South Korea
65 kg	Navjot Kaur; India	Miyu Imai; Japan	None awarded
68 kg	Zhou Feng; China	Sharkhüügiin Tümentsetseg; Mongolia	Irina Kazyulina; Kazakhstan
68 kg	Zhou Feng; China	Sharkhüügiin Tümentsetseg; Mongolia	Meerim Zhumanazarova; Kyrgyzstan
72 kg	Han Yue; China	Ochirbatyn Nasanburmaa; Mongolia	Masako Furuichi; Japan
72 kg	Han Yue; China	Ochirbatyn Nasanburmaa; Mongolia	None awarded
76 kg	Zhou Qian; China	Hiroe Minagawa; Japan	Hwang Eun-ju; South Korea
76 kg	Zhou Qian; China	Hiroe Minagawa; Japan	Elmira Syzdykova; Kazakhstan

== Participating nations ==
318 competitors from 20 nations competed.

- Bahrain (2)
- China (28)
- Chinese Taipei (10)
- India (30)
- Iran (20)
- Iraq (10)
- Japan (30)
- Jordan (4)
- Kazakhstan (30)
- Kyrgyzstan (24)
- Mongolia (20)
- North Korea (6)
- Palestine (1)
- Qatar (1)
- South Korea (29)
- Tajikistan (18)
- Thailand (8)
- Turkmenistan (11)
- Uzbekistan (30)
- Vietnam (6)
