= Nabira Esenbaeva =

Uzbekistani freestyle wrestler

Personal information
- Born: 9 December 1998 (age 27)

Sport
- Country: Uzbekistan
- Sport: Amateur wrestling
- Event: Freestyle
Medal record
Women's freestyle wrestling
Representing Uzbekistan
Golden Grand Prix Ivan Yarygin
Bronze medal – third place	2024 Krasnoyarsk	68 kg
Asian Championships
Silver medal – second place	2018 Bishkek	59 kg
Bronze medal – third place	2019 Xi'an	62 kg
World Junior Championships
Silver medal – second place	2018 Trnava	62 kg

Nabira Esenbaeva (born 9 December 1998) is an Uzbekistani freestyle wrestler. She won the silver medal in the women's 59 kg event at the 2018 Asian Wrestling Championships held in Bishkek, Kyrgyzstan. In 2019, she won one of the bronze medals in the women's 62 kg event at the Asian Wrestling Championships held in Xi'an, China.

== Career ==
Esenbaeva competed at the first World Olympic Qualification Tournament held in Ulaanbaatar, Mongolia hoping to qualify for the 2016 Summer Olympics in Rio de Janeiro, Brazil. She was eliminated in her first match. In 2018, she competed in the 57 kg event at the Asian Games held in Jakarta, Indonesia. She won her first match against Mutiara Ayuningtias of Indonesia and she was eliminated from the competition in her next match against Pooja Dhanda of India. At the 2018 World Junior Wrestling Championships held in Trnava, Slovakia, she won the silver medal in the 62 kg event.

In 2019, Esenbaeva competed in the 62 kg event at the World Wrestling Championships held in Nur-Sultan, Kazakhstan. She was eliminated in her first match by Kayla Miracle of the United States. In 2021, she competed at the Asian Olympic Qualification Tournament hoping to qualify for the 2020 Summer Olympics in Tokyo, Japan. She did not qualify at this tournament and she also failed to qualify for the Olympics at the World Olympic Qualification Tournament held in Sofia, Bulgaria.

In 2022, Esenbaeva competed at the Yasar Dogu Tournament held in Istanbul, Turkey.

Esenbaeva competed at the 2024 Asian Wrestling Olympic Qualification Tournament in Bishkek, Kyrgyzstan hoping to qualify for the 2024 Summer Olympics in Paris, France. She was eliminated in her third match and she did not qualify for the Olympics. Esenbaeva also competed at the 2024 World Wrestling Olympic Qualification Tournament held in Istanbul, Turkey without qualifying for the Olympics. She was eliminated in her first match.

== Achievements ==
Year	Tournament	Location	Result	Event
2018	Asian Championships	Bishkek, Kyrgyzstan	2nd	Freestyle 59 kg
2019	Asian Championships	Xi'an, China	3rd	Freestyle 62 kg
