= Bi Shengfeng =

Chinese freestyle wrestler (born 1989)

Personal information
- Born: January 28, 1989 (age 37) Xiwennan Village, Gaozhuang, Laiwu, Shandong, China
- Occupation: Wrestler

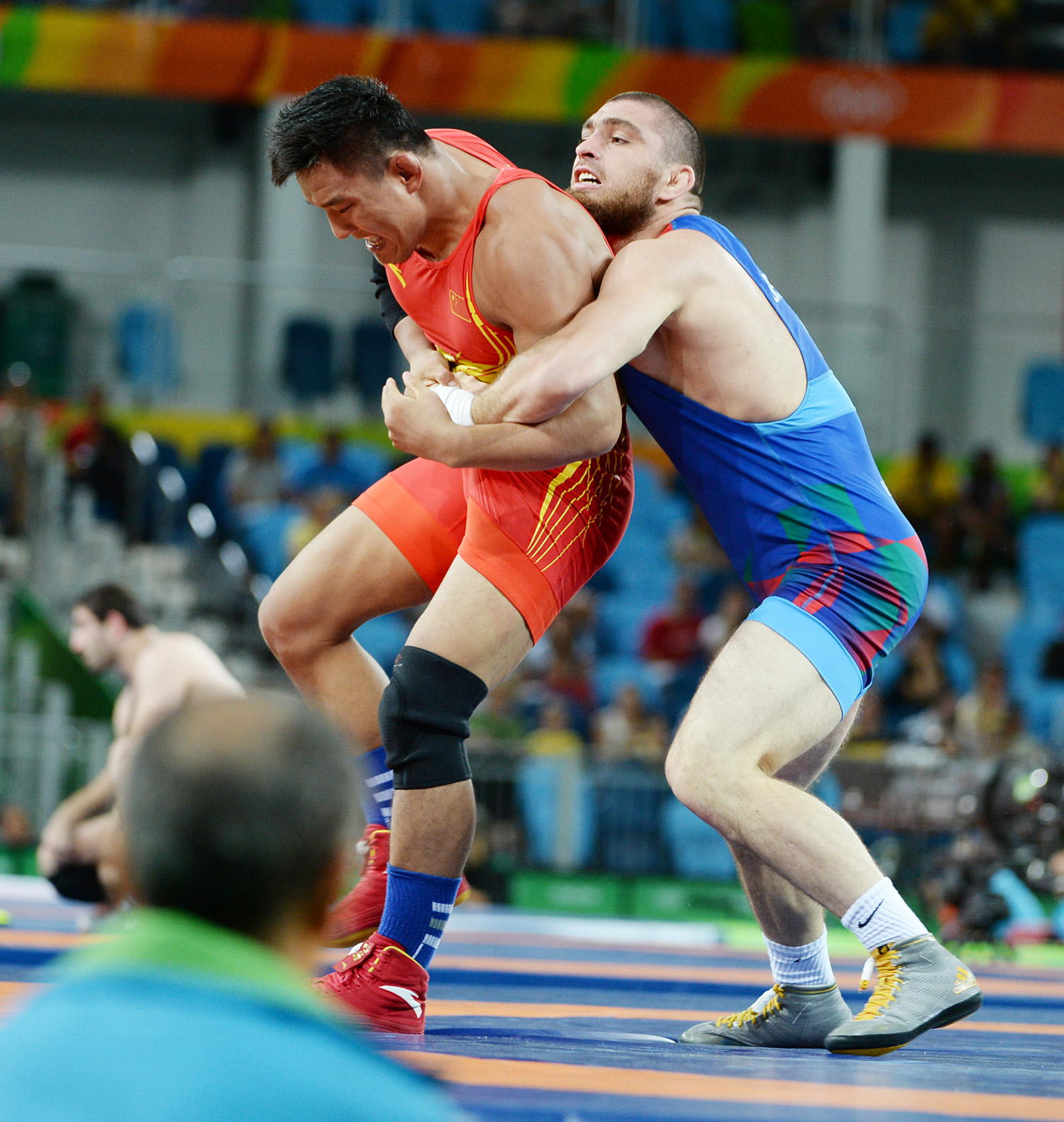
Bi (left) against Sharifov during the 2016 Olympics

Bi Shengfeng
Medal record

Representing China

Men's freestyle

Asian Championships
Bronze medal – third place	2018 Bishkek	86 kg

Bi Shengfeng (Chinese: 毕胜峰; Chinese: 畢勝峰; pinyin: Bì Shèngfēng, born January 28, 1989) is a Chinese freestyle wrestler. He competed in the men's freestyle 86 kg event at the 2016 Summer Olympics, in which he was eliminated in the round of 16 by Sharif Sharifov.
