= Makhmudjon Shavkatov =

Uzbekistani freestyle wrestler

Personal information
- Born: 26 June 1994 (age 32)
- Height: 160 cm (5 ft 3 in)

Sport
- Country: Uzbekistan
- Sport: Amateur wrestling
- Weight class: 57 kg
- Event: Freestyle
Medal record
Men's freestyle wrestling
Representing Uzbekistan
Asian Indoor and Martial Arts Games
Gold medal – first place	2017 Ashgabat	57 kg
Asian Championships
Silver medal – second place	2018 Bishkek	57 kg
Bronze medal – third place	2019 Xi'an	57 kg

Makhmudjon Shavkatov (born 26 June 1994) is an Uzbekistani freestyle wrestler. At the 2017 Asian Indoor and Martial Arts Games held in Ashgabat, Turkmenistan, he won the gold medal in the 57 kg event. He is also a two-time medalist at the Asian Wrestling Championships.

== Career ==
In 2018, Shavkatov competed in the 57 kg event at the Asian Games held in Jakarta, Indonesia without winning a medal. He was eliminated from the competition in his fourth match by Kim Sung-gwon of South Korea.

Shavkatov won one of the bronze medals in the men's 57 kg event at the 2019 Asian Wrestling Championships held in Xi'an, China. In 2021, he won the bronze medal in the men's 57 kg event at the 2021 Waclaw Ziolkowski Memorial held in Warsaw, Poland.

== Achievements ==
Year	Tournament	Location	Result	Event
2017	Asian Indoor and Martial Arts Games	Ashgabat, Turkmenistan	1st	Freestyle 57 kg
2018	Asian Championships	Bishkek, Kyrgyzstan	2nd	Freestyle 57 kg
2019	Asian Championships	Xi'an, China	3rd	Freestyle 57 kg
