= Saki Igarashi =

Japanese freestyle wrestler

Sport
- Country: Japan
- Sport: Amateur wrestling
- Event: Freestyle
Medal record
Women's freestyle wrestling
Representing Japan
Asian Championships
Gold medal – first place	2018 Bishkek	55 kg
Silver medal – second place	2019 Xi'an	55 kg
World U23 Championships
Gold medal – first place	2018 Bucharest	55 kg
Silver medal – second place	2019 Budapest	55 kg

Saki Igarashi is a Japanese freestyle wrestler. At the 2018 Asian Wrestling Championships held in Bishkek, Kyrgyzstan, she won the gold medal in the women's 55 kg event.

In 2018, she won the gold medal at the World U23 Wrestling Championship in the 55 kg event. In 2019, at the World U23 Wrestling Championship held in Budapest, Hungary she won the silver medal in the 55 kg event.

She won the silver medal in the women's 55 kg event at the 2019 Asian Wrestling Championships held in Xi'an, China.
