= Tomohiro Inoue =

Japanese wrestler (born 1987)

Medal record

Representing Japan

Men's Greco-Roman

Asian Championships
Bronze medal – third place	2018 Bishkek	72 kg
Bronze medal – third place	2013 New Delhi	74 kg

Tomohiro Inoue (井上 智裕, Inoue Tomohiro; born July 17, 1987) is a Japanese Greco-Roman wrestler. He competed in the men's Greco-Roman 66 kg event at the 2016 Summer Olympics, in which he lost the bronze medal match to Shmagi Bolkvadze.
