= 2020 Asian Wrestling Championships – Results =

These are the results of the 2020 Asian Wrestling Championships which took place between 18 and 23 February 2020 in New Delhi, India.

== Men's freestyle ==
=== 57 kg ===
22 February

Round of 16
Ravi Kumar Dahiya (IND)	14
Yuki Takahashi (JPN)	5
Nurislam Sanayev (KAZ)	9
Ahmed Jawad (IRQ)	0
Alireza Sarlak (IRI)	10
Chou Chia-wei (TPE)	0

Quarterfinals
Sardor Ruzimov (UZB)	12
Gamal Al-Sabri (YEM)	0
Bekbolot Myrzanazar Uulu (KGZ)	6
Hikmatullo Vohidov (TJK)	7
Batjargalyn Tögs (MGL)	3
Ravi Kumar Dahiya (IND)	6^{F}
Nurislam Sanayev (KAZ)	4
Alireza Sarlak (IRI)	2

Semifinals
Sardor Ruzimov (UZB)	2
Hikmatullo Vohidov (TJK)	3
Ravi Kumar Dahiya (IND)	7
Nurislam Sanayev (KAZ)	2

Final
Hikmatullo Vohidov (TJK)	0
Ravi Kumar Dahiya (IND)	10

Repechage round 1
Yuki Takahashi (JPN)	10
Batjargalyn Tögs (MGL)	0

Bronze medals
Bekbolot Myrzanazar Uulu (KGZ)	7^{F}
Sardor Ruzimov (UZB)	0
Yuki Takahashi (JPN)	14
Nurislam Sanayev (KAZ)	5

=== 61 kg ===
23 February

Round of 16
Yun Ji-hoon (KOR)	4
Alibeg Alibegov (BRN)	0
Rahul Aware (IND)	5
Muhammad Bilal (PAK)	1
Rami Al-Ama (KSA)	2
Jahongirmirza Turobov (UZB)	12
Ulukbek Zholdoshbekov (KGZ)	4
Nurbolat Abdualiyev (KAZ)	1
Namsrain Ganbayar (MGL)	1
Majid Dastan (IRI)	11

Quarterfinals
Ryuto Sakaki (JPN)	10
Egor Dmitriev (PHI)	0
Muhamad Ikromov (TJK)	3
Yun Ji-hoon (KOR)	3
Rahul Aware (IND)	11
Jahongirmirza Turobov (UZB)	9
Ulukbek Zholdoshbekov (KGZ)	4
Majid Dastan (IRI)	2

Semifinals
Ryuto Sakaki (JPN)	4
Muhamad Ikromov (TJK)	4
Rahul Aware (IND)	3
Ulukbek Zholdoshbekov (KGZ)	5

Final
Muhamad Ikromov (TJK)	0
Ulukbek Zholdoshbekov (KGZ)	3^{F}

Repechage round 1
Nurbolat Abdualiyev (KAZ)	2
Majid Dastan (IRI)	12

Bronze medals
Yun Ji-hoon (KOR)	2
Ryuto Sakaki (JPN)	4
Majid Dastan (IRI)	2
Rahul Aware (IND)	5

=== 65 kg ===
22 February

Round of 16
Haji Mohamad Ali (BRN)	2
Daulet Niyazbekov (KAZ)	7
Takuto Otoguro (JPN)	10
Mohammed Al-Jawad (IRQ)	0
Chang Yu-hsuan (TPE)	12
Hussein Al-Azzani (YEM)	0
Nurgazy Abdurazakov (KGZ)	0
Amir Hossein Maghsoudi (IRI)	10
Dzhamshed Sharifov (TJK)	0
Bajrang Punia (IND)	11
Abbos Rakhmonov (UZB)	10
Putawan Senawat (THA)	0

Quarterfinals
Battulgyn Nyamdorj (MGL)	7^{F}
Yun Jun-sik (KOR)	3
Daulet Niyazbekov (KAZ)	3
Takuto Otoguro (JPN)	10
Chang Yu-hsuan (TPE)	0
Amir Hossein Maghsoudi (IRI)	10
Bajrang Punia (IND)	12
Abbos Rakhmonov (UZB)	2

Semifinals
Battulgyn Nyamdorj (MGL)	1
Takuto Otoguro (JPN)	11
Amir Hossein Maghsoudi (IRI)	0
Bajrang Punia (IND)	10

Final
Takuto Otoguro (JPN)	10
Bajrang Punia (IND)	2

Repechage round 1
Mohammed Al-Jawad (IRQ)	2
Daulet Niyazbekov (KAZ)	8^{F}
Dzhamshed Sharifov (TJK)	2
Abbos Rakhmonov (UZB)	7

Bronze medals
Daulet Niyazbekov (KAZ)	4
Battulgyn Nyamdorj (MGL)	1
Abbos Rakhmonov (UZB)	0
Amir Hossein Maghsoudi (IRI)	2

=== 70 kg ===
22 February

Round of 16
Islambek Orozbekov (KGZ)	10
Abdulrahman Ibrahim (QAT)	0

Quarterfinals
Meirzhan Ashirov (KAZ)	4
Amir Hossein Hosseini (IRI)	5
Naveen (IND)	5
Jeon Tae-jin (KOR)	5
Enkhtuyaagiin Temüülen (MGL)	4
Shin Haraguchi (JPN)	1
Ilyas Bekbulatov (UZB)	14
Islambek Orozbekov (KGZ)	3

Semifinals
Amir Hossein Hosseini (IRI)	3
Naveen (IND)	2
Enkhtuyaagiin Temüülen (MGL)	2^{R}
Ilyas Bekbulatov (UZB)	4

Final
Amir Hossein Hosseini (IRI)	6
Ilyas Bekbulatov (UZB)	10

Bronze medals
Meirzhan Ashirov (KAZ)	12
Naveen (IND)	1
Islambek Orozbekov (KGZ)	WO
Enkhtuyaagiin Temüülen (MGL)

=== 74 kg ===
23 February

Round of 16
Parinya Chamnanjan (THA)	0
Jitender Kumar (IND)	10
Mostafa Hosseinkhani (IRI)	3
Bekzhan Dzhambulov (KGZ)	0
Gulomdzhon Sharipov (TJK)	10
Mirzo Khayitov (UZB)	3
Zandanbudyn Sumiyaabazar (MGL)	WO
~~Abdul Rehman (PAK)~~

Quarterfinals
Karam Shakir (IRQ)	0
Daniyar Kaisanov (KAZ)	10
Mohammad Abdulkareem (KUW)	0
Daichi Takatani (JPN)	2^{F}
Jitender Kumar (IND)	2
Mostafa Hosseinkhani (IRI)	2
Gulomdzhon Sharipov (TJK)	4
Zandanbudyn Sumiyaabazar (MGL)	7

Semifinals
Daniyar Kaisanov (KAZ)	9
Daichi Takatani (JPN)	4
Jitender Kumar (IND)	2
Zandanbudyn Sumiyaabazar (MGL)	1

Final
Daniyar Kaisanov (KAZ)	3
Jitender Kumar (IND)	1

Repechage round 1
Parinya Chamnanjan (THA)	0
Mostafa Hosseinkhani (IRI)	10

Bronze medals
Karam Shakir (IRQ)	4
Daichi Takatani (JPN)	15
Mostafa Hosseinkhani (IRI)	5
Zandanbudyn Sumiyaabazar (MGL)	0

=== 79 kg ===
22 February

Quarterfinals		Semifinals		Final
Damjingiin Batzul (MGL)	1
Gourav Baliyan (IND)	3	Gourav Baliyan (IND)	6
Shinkichi Okui (JPN)	3	Shinkichi Okui (JPN)	5
Yun Hwi-seung (KOR)	1			Gourav Baliyan (IND)	5
Galymzhan Usserbayev (KAZ)	2			Arsalan Budazhapov (KGZ)	7
Arsalan Budazhapov (KGZ)	4	Arsalan Budazhapov (KGZ)	3
Ali Savadkouhi (IRI)	10	Ali Savadkouhi (IRI)	1
Sukhrob Sharipov (UZB)	0

Bronze medals
Damjingiin Batzul (MGL)	3
Shinkichi Okui (JPN)	4
Galymzhan Usserbayev (KAZ)	0
Ali Savadkouhi (IRI)	5

=== 86 kg ===
23 February

Round of 16
Shutaro Yamada (JPN)	10
Issa Abdul-Salam (IRQ)	0

Quarterfinals
Bakhodur Kadirov (TJK)	4
Isa Shapiev (UZB)	7
Azamat Dauletbekov (KAZ)	4
Ahmad Bazri (IRI)	5
Deepak Punia (IND)	8
Ganbaataryn Gankhuyag (MGL)	2
Aligadzhi Gamidgadzhiev (KGZ)
Shutaro Yamada (JPN)	WO

Semifinals
Isa Shapiev (UZB)	5
Ahmad Bazri (IRI)	16
Deepak Punia (IND)	1
Shutaro Yamada (JPN)	4

Final
Ahmad Bazri (IRI)	10
Shutaro Yamada (JPN)	10

Repechage round 1
Issa Abdul-Salam (IRQ)	WO
Aligadzhi Gamidgadzhiev (KGZ)

Bronze medals
Azamat Dauletbekov (KAZ)	2
Isa Shapiev (UZB)	4
Issa Abdul-Salam (IRQ)	0
Deepak Punia (IND)	10

=== 92 kg ===
23 February

Quarterfinals		Semifinals		Final
Mönkhbaataryn Tsogtgerel (MGL)	11
Lee Seung-dong (KOR)	0	Mönkhbaataryn Tsogtgerel (MGL)	1
Chyngyz Kerimkulov (KGZ)	2	Takuma Otsu (JPN)	11
Takuma Otsu (JPN)	5			Takuma Otsu (JPN)	0
Somveer Kadian (IND)	0			Mohammad Javad Ebrahimi (IRI)	11
Ajiniyaz Saparniyazov (UZB)	10	Ajiniyaz Saparniyazov (UZB)	2
Mohammad Javad Ebrahimi (IRI)	6	Mohammad Javad Ebrahimi (IRI)	10
Iliskhan Chilayev (KAZ)	2

Bronze medals
Chyngyz Kerimkulov (KGZ)	1
Mönkhbaataryn Tsogtgerel (MGL)	11
Iliskhan Chilayev (KAZ)	4
Ajiniyaz Saparniyazov (UZB)	4

=== 97 kg ===
22 February

Round of 16
Taira Sonoda (JPN)	5
Seo Min-won (KOR)	5
Makhsud Veysalov (UZB)	0
Alisher Yergali (KAZ)	10
Baasantsogtyn Ölziisaikhan (MGL)	0
Mojtaba Goleij (IRI)	11

Quarterfinals
Tayab Raza (PAK)	5
Rustam Iskandari (TJK)	12
Satyawart Kadian (IND)	10
Zaid Shishani (JOR)	0
Magomed Musaev (KGZ)	7
Seo Min-won (KOR)	2
Alisher Yergali (KAZ)	4
Mojtaba Goleij (IRI)	6

Semifinals
Rustam Iskandari (TJK)	0
Satyawart Kadian (IND)	10
Magomed Musaev (KGZ)	2
Mojtaba Goleij (IRI)	12

Final
Satyawart Kadian (IND)	0
Mojtaba Goleij (IRI)	10

Repechage round 1
Baasantsogtyn Ölziisaikhan (MGL)	8
Alisher Yergali (KAZ)	16

Bronze medals
Zaid Shishani (JOR)	0
Rustam Iskandari (TJK)	6^{F}
Alisher Yergali (KAZ)	11
Magomed Musaev (KGZ)	5

=== 125 kg ===
23 February

Round of 16
Omar Sarem (SYR)	4
Parviz Hadi (IRI)	14
Tahar Lutfi (IRQ)	0
Aiaal Lazarev (KGZ)	10
Sukhrobjon Mukaramov (UZB)	4
Satender Malik (IND)	5
Yusup Batirmurzaev (KAZ)	11
Farkhod Anakulov (TJK)	0

Quarterfinals
Zaman Anwar (PAK)	1
Dorjkhandyn Khüderbulga (MGL)	12
Nam Kyung-jin (KOR)	11
Tetsuya Tanaka (JPN)	0
Parviz Hadi (IRI)	10
Aiaal Lazarev (KGZ)	0
Satender Malik (IND)	0
Yusup Batirmurzaev (KAZ)	11

Semifinals
Dorjkhandyn Khüderbulga (MGL)	8
Nam Kyung-jin (KOR)	0
Parviz Hadi (IRI)	0
Yusup Batirmurzaev (KAZ)	4^{F}

Final
Dorjkhandyn Khüderbulga (MGL)	0
Yusup Batirmurzaev (KAZ)	10

Repechage round 1
Farkhod Anakulov (TJK)	12
Satender Malik (IND)	1

Bronze medals
Zaman Anwar (PAK)	0
Nam Kyung-jin (KOR)	10
Farkhod Anakulov (TJK)	0
Parviz Hadi (IRI)	10

== Men's Greco-Roman ==
=== 55 kg ===
18 February

Round of 16
Hiromu Katagiri (JPN)	0
Sardarbek Konushbaev (KGZ)	9

Quarterfinals
Turki Hazazi (KSA)	2
Arjun Halakurki (IND)	10
Pouya Nasserpour (IRI)	9
Won Dong-hyeok (KOR)	0
Sahatsawat Phuangkaeo (THA)	0
Jasurbek Ortikboev (UZB)	10
Khorlan Zhakansha (KAZ)	4^{F}
Sardarbek Konushbaev (KGZ)	5

Semifinals
Arjun Halakurki (IND)	7
Pouya Nasserpour (IRI)	8
Jasurbek Ortikboev (UZB)	8
Khorlan Zhakansha (KAZ)	0

Final
Pouya Nasserpour (IRI)	8
Jasurbek Ortikboev (UZB)	0

Bronze medals
Won Dong-hyeok (KOR)	4
Arjun Halakurki (IND)	7
Sahatsawat Phuangkaeo (THA)	1
Khorlan Zhakansha (KAZ)	10

=== 60 kg ===
19 February

Round of 16
Aidos Sultangali (KAZ)	6
Zholaman Sharshenbekov (KGZ)	7
Nuttapong Hinmee (THA)	0
Mönkh-Erdeniin Davaabandi (MGL)	9

Quarterfinals
Islomjon Bakhromov (UZB)	9^{C}
Firuz Mirzoradzhabov (TJK)	0
Gyanender Dahiya (IND)	0
Kenichiro Fumita (JPN)	9
Karrar Abbas (IRQ)	1
Mehdi Mohsennejad (IRI)	9
Zholaman Sharshenbekov (KGZ)	10
Mönkh-Erdeniin Davaabandi (MGL)	0

Semifinals
Islomjon Bakhromov (UZB)	0
Kenichiro Fumita (JPN)	9
Mehdi Mohsennejad (IRI)	2
Zholaman Sharshenbekov (KGZ)	9

Final
Kenichiro Fumita (JPN)	4
Zholaman Sharshenbekov (KGZ)	0

Repechage round 1
Aidos Sultangali (KAZ)	8
Mönkh-Erdeniin Davaabandi (MGL)	0

Bronze medals
Gyanender Dahiya (IND)	0
Islomjon Bakhromov (UZB)	6
Aidos Sultangali (KAZ)	3
Mehdi Mohsennejad (IRI)	4

=== 63 kg ===
18 February

Round of 16
Tynar Sharshenbekov (KGZ)	0
Sachin Rana (IND)	6
Elmurat Tasmuradov (UZB)	7
Yernur Fidakhmetov (KAZ)	0

Quarterfinals
Rattanachai Chairit (THA)	0
Mohammad Al-Ajmi (KUW)	5^{F}
Song Jin-seub (KOR)	8
Mubinjon Akhmedov (TJK)	7
Meisam Dalkhani (IRI)	9
Yoshiki Yamada (JPN)	0
Sachin Rana (IND)	0
Elmurat Tasmuradov (UZB)	8

Semifinals
Mohammad Al-Ajmi (KUW)	1
Song Jin-seub (KOR)	8
Meisam Dalkhani (IRI)	1
Elmurat Tasmuradov (UZB)	10

Final
Song Jin-seub (KOR)	0
Elmurat Tasmuradov (UZB)	9

Repechage round 1
Yernur Fidakhmetov (KAZ)	6
Sachin Rana (IND)	3

Bronze medals
Mubinjon Akhmedov (TJK)	7^{F}
Mohammad Al-Ajmi (KUW)	2
Yernur Fidakhmetov (KAZ)	0
Meisam Dalkhani (IRI)	2

=== 67 kg ===
19 February

Round of 16
Wael Jasim (IRQ)	0
Tsuchika Shimoyamada (JPN)	4
Marlen Asikeev (KGZ)	4
Adilkhan Satayev (KAZ)	6^{F}
Zaynudin Qamarov (TJK)	1
Hossein Asadi (IRI)	9

Quarterfinals
Lin Fu-hao (TPE)	0
Ashu Bazard (IND)	10
Abdulkarim Al-Hasan (SYR)	1
Makhmud Bakhshilloev (UZB)	4
Ryu Han-su (KOR)	11
Tsuchika Shimoyamada (JPN)	5
Adilkhan Satayev (KAZ)	0
Hossein Asadi (IRI)	8

Semifinals
Ashu Bazard (IND)	4
Makhmud Bakhshilloev (UZB)	4
Ryu Han-su (KOR)	5
Hossein Asadi (IRI)	1

Final
Makhmud Bakhshilloev (UZB)	1
Ryu Han-su (KOR)	4

Bronze medals
Abdulkarim Al-Hasan (SYR)	1
Ashu Bazard (IND)	8
Tsuchika Shimoyamada (JPN)	3
Hossein Asadi (IRI)	5

=== 72 kg ===
19 February

Round of 16
Aditya Kundu (IND)	8
Alijon Khuseynov (UZB)	2

Quarterfinals
Kim Ji-hun (KOR)	1
Ruslan Tsarev (KGZ)	5
Amin Kavianinejad (IRI)	8
Chen Yan-kai (TPE)	0
Nao Kusaka (JPN)	1
Ibragim Magomadov (KAZ)	8
Loiqi Amirkhonzoda (TJK)	0
Aditya Kundu (IND)	9

Semifinals
Ruslan Tsarev (KGZ)	0
Amin Kavianinejad (IRI)	3
Ibragim Magomadov (KAZ)	9
Aditya Kundu (IND)	0

Final
Amin Kavianinejad (IRI)	8
Ibragim Magomadov (KAZ)	0

Bronze medals
Chen Yan-kai (TPE)	0
Ruslan Tsarev (KGZ)	8^{F}
Nao Kusaka (JPN)	0
Aditya Kundu (IND)	8

=== 77 kg ===
18 February

Round of 16
Hussein Ali (IRQ)	6^{F}
Rabbia Khalil (PLE)	2
Sajan Bhanwal (IND)	6
Renat Iliaz Uulu (KGZ)	9
Abdullah Al-Dossary (KSA)	0
Kodai Sakuraba (JPN)	8
Bekzod Umarov (UZB)	1
Pejman Poshtam (IRI)	3
Muslihiddin Uroqov (TJK)	10
Bakhit Sharif Badr (QAT)	1

Quarterfinals
~~Chanwit Aunjai (THA)~~
Sultan Ali Eid (JOR)	WO
Tamerlan Shadukayev (KAZ)	10
Hussein Ali (IRQ)	0
Renat Iliaz Uulu (KGZ)	4
Kodai Sakuraba (JPN)	2
Pejman Poshtam (IRI)	9
Muslihiddin Uroqov (TJK)	0

Semifinals
Sultan Ali Eid (JOR)	0
Tamerlan Shadukayev (KAZ)	8
Renat Iliaz Uulu (KGZ)	0
Pejman Poshtam (IRI)	5

Final
Tamerlan Shadukayev (KAZ)	10
Pejman Poshtam (IRI)	1

Repechage round 1
Bekzod Umarov (UZB)	8
Muslihiddin Uroqov (TJK)	0

Bronze medals
Hussein Ali (IRQ)	12
Sultan Ali Eid (JOR)	4
Bekzod Umarov (UZB)	0
Renat Iliaz Uulu (KGZ)	5

=== 82 kg ===
19 February

Pos	Athlete	Pld	W	L	CP	TP	IRI	KAZ	IND	JPN
1	Mehdi Ebrahimi (IRI)	3	3	0	9	15	—	3–0	7–0	5–2
2	Yevgeniy Polivadov (KAZ)	3	2	1	8	14	0–3 PO	—	5–2	9–3 Fall
3	Harpreet Singh Sandhu (IND)	3	1	2	4	8	0–3 PO	1–3 PO1	—	6–1
4	Satoki Mukai (JPN)	3	0	3	2	6	1–3 PO1	0–5 FA	1–3 PO1	—

Source: UWW

Pos	Athlete	Pld	W	L	CP	TP	KOR	UZB	KGZ
1	Choi Jun-hyeong (KOR)	2	2	0	6	9	—	2–1	7–1
2	Jalgasbay Berdimuratov (UZB)	2	1	1	4	6	1–3 PO1	—	5–1
3	Samatbek Chonoraliev (KGZ)	2	0	2	2	2	1–3 PO1	1–3 PO1	—

Source: UWW

Semifinals
Mehdi Ebrahimi (IRI)	6
Jalgasbay Berdimuratov (UZB)	5
Choi Jun-hyeong (KOR)	3
Yevgeniy Polivadov (KAZ)	0

Final
Mehdi Ebrahimi (IRI)	3
Choi Jun-hyeong (KOR)	1
Bronze medal
Jalgasbay Berdimuratov (UZB)	8^{F}
Yevgeniy Polivadov (KAZ)	2

=== 87 kg ===
18 February

Round of 16
Azat Salidinov (KGZ)	4
Sukhrob Abdulkhaev (TJK)	2

Quarterfinals
Park Hea-geun (KOR)	1
Azamat Kustubayev (KAZ)	2
Takahiro Tsuruda (JPN)	2
Sunil Kumar (IND)	8
Behrouz Hedayat (IRI)	6
Rustam Assakalov (UZB)	6
Abbas Shaalan (IRQ)	0
Azat Salidinov (KGZ)	9

Semifinals
Azamat Kustubayev (KAZ)	8
Sunil Kumar (IND)	12
Behrouz Hedayat (IRI)	7^{R}
Azat Salidinov (KGZ)	0

Final
Sunil Kumar (IND)	5
Azat Salidinov (KGZ)	0

Repechage round 1
~~Sukhrob Abdulkhaev (TJK)~~
~~Abbas Shaalan (IRQ)~~

Bronze medals
Takahiro Tsuruda (JPN)	1
Azamat Kustubayev (KAZ)	3
Bye
~~Behrouz Hedayat (IRI)~~

=== 97 kg ===
19 February

Round of 16
Mirzoamin Safarov (TJK)	0
Yuta Nara (JPN)	9^{F}
Alimkhan Syzdykov (KAZ)	5
Beksultan Makhmudov (KGZ)	8

Quarterfinals
Ali Majeed (IRQ)	4
Muhammadali Shamsiddinov (UZB)	6
Lee Se-yeol (KOR)	4^{F}
Ponlawat Siammai (THA)	0
Mohammad Hadi Saravi (IRI)	9
Hardeep Singh (IND)	1
Yuta Nara (JPN)	4
Beksultan Makhmudov (KGZ)	7

Semifinals
Muhammadali Shamsiddinov (UZB)	1
Lee Se-yeol (KOR)	3
Mohammad Hadi Saravi (IRI)	5^{F}
Beksultan Makhmudov (KGZ)	0

Final
Lee Se-yeol (KOR)	2
Mohammad Hadi Saravi (IRI)	5

Bronze medals
Ponlawat Siammai (THA)	0
Muhammadali Shamsiddinov (UZB)	4^{F}
Hardeep Singh (IND)	3
Beksultan Makhmudov (KGZ)	1

=== 130 kg ===
18 February

Quarterfinals		Semifinals		Final
Kim Min-seok (KOR)	5
Roman Kim (KGZ)	2	Kim Min-seok (KOR)	9
Mehar Singh (IND)	4	Mehar Singh (IND)	1
Daler Rakhmatov (UZB)	0			Kim Min-seok (KOR)	0
Amin Mirzazadeh (IRI)	3			Amin Mirzazadeh (IRI)	9
Mansur Shadukayev (KAZ)	3	Amin Mirzazadeh (IRI)	6
Arata Sonoda (JPN)	9	Arata Sonoda (JPN)	1
Ahmed Shaalan (IRQ)	0

Bronze medals
Roman Kim (KGZ)	3
Mehar Singh (IND)	2
Mansur Shadukayev (KAZ)	9
Arata Sonoda (JPN)	1

== Women's freestyle ==
=== 50 kg ===
20 February

Quarterfinals		Semifinals		Final
Cheon Mi-ran (KOR)	0
Valentina Islamova (KAZ)	10	Valentina Islamova (KAZ)	3
Miho Igarashi (JPN)	8	Miho Igarashi (JPN)	5
Nguyễn Thị Xuân (VIE)	2			Miho Igarashi (JPN)	3
Byambasürengiin Mönkhnar (MGL)	4			Nirmala Devi (IND)	2
Nirmala Devi (IND)	6	Nirmala Devi (IND)	10
Chen Hsiao-ching (TPE)	0^{R}	Dauletbike Yakhshimuratova (UZB)	0
Dauletbike Yakhshimuratova (UZB)	4

Bronze medals
Nguyễn Thị Xuân (VIE)	0
Valentina Islamova (KAZ)	10
Byambasürengiin Mönkhnar (MGL)	3
Dauletbike Yakhshimuratova (UZB)	8

=== 53 kg ===
21 February

Round of 16
Aktenge Keunimjaeva (UZB)	6
Ganbaataryn Otgonjargal (MGL)	5
Vatansulton Shakarshoeva (TJK)	6
Chiu Jo-cih (TPE)	8

Quarterfinals
Oh Jeong-bin (KOR)	0
Kiều Thị Ly (VIE)	4
Mayu Mukaida (JPN)	6
Vinesh Phogat (IND)	2
Chantha Thongart (THA)	0
Tatyana Akhmetova-Amanzhol (KAZ)	10^{F}
Aktenge Keunimjaeva (UZB)	5^{F}
Chiu Jo-cih (TPE)	1

Semifinals
Kiều Thị Ly (VIE)	0
Mayu Mukaida (JPN)	10
Tatyana Akhmetova-Amanzhol (KAZ)	11^{F}
Aktenge Keunimjaeva (UZB)	0

Final
Mayu Mukaida (JPN)	8
Tatyana Akhmetova-Amanzhol (KAZ)	2^{F}

Bronze medals
Vinesh Phogat (IND)	10
Kiều Thị Ly (VIE)	0
Chantha Thongart (THA)	0
Aktenge Keunimjaeva (UZB)	2^{F}

=== 55 kg ===
20 February

Pos	Athlete	Pld	W	L	CP	TP	KAZ	MGL	KOR
1	Marina Zuyeva (KAZ)	2	2	0	8	15	—	11–8	4–0 Fall
2	Mönkhboldyn Dölgöön (MGL)	2	1	1	6	12	1–3 PO1	—	4–0 Fall
3	Kim Jin-hee (KOR)	2	0	2	0	0	0–5 FA	0–5 FA	—

Source: UWW

Pos	Athlete	Pld	W	L	CP	TP	JPN	IND	UZB
1	Kana Higashikawa (JPN)	2	2	0	6	10	—	2–2	8–6
2	Pinki (IND)	2	1	1	6	14	1–3 PO1	—	12–4 Fall
3	Shokhida Akhmedova (UZB)	2	0	2	1	10	1–3 PO1	0–5 FA	—

Source: UWW

Semifinals
Marina Zuyeva (KAZ)	0
Pinki (IND)	6
Kana Higashikawa (JPN)	0
Mönkhboldyn Dölgöön (MGL)	2^{F}

Final
Pinki (IND)	2
Mönkhboldyn Dölgöön (MGL)	1
Bronze medal
Marina Zuyeva (KAZ)	8^{F}
Kana Higashikawa (JPN)	0

=== 57 kg ===
21 February

Quarterfinals		Semifinals		Final
Nuraida Anarkulova (KGZ)	1
Anshu Malik (IND)	11	Anshu Malik (IND)	0
Sevara Eshmuratova (UZB)	0	Risako Kawai (JPN)	10
Risako Kawai (JPN)	7			Risako Kawai (JPN)	10
Đào Thị Hương (VIE)	2			Erkhembayaryn Davaachimeg (MGL)	0
Erkhembayaryn Davaachimeg (MGL)	3^{F}	Erkhembayaryn Davaachimeg (MGL)	4^{F}
Apinya Taengphonkrang (THA)	0	Altynay Satylgan (KAZ)	3
Altynay Satylgan (KAZ)	6^{F}

Bronze medals
Sevara Eshmuratova (UZB)	1
Anshu Malik (IND)	4
Đào Thị Hương (VIE)	2
Altynay Satylgan (KAZ)	4^{F}

=== 59 kg ===
20 February

Pos	Athlete	Pld	W	L	CP	TP	MGL	JPN	UZB	KOR
1	Altantsetsegiin Battsetseg (MGL)	3	3	0	12	20	—	2–0 Fall	10–0	8–2
2	Yumi Kon (JPN)	3	2	1	8	14	0–5 FA	—	6–0 Fall	8–2
3	Gulnora Toshpulatova (UZB)	3	1	2	3	6	0–4 SU	0–5 FA	—	6–4
4	Kwon Young-jin (KOR)	3	0	3	3	8	1–3 PO1	1–3 PO1	1–3 PO1	—

Source: UWW

Pos	Athlete	Pld	W	L	CP	TP	IND	KAZ	KGZ
1	Sarita Mor (IND)	2	2	0	8	21	—	10–0	11–0
2	Madina Bakbergenova (KAZ)	2	1	1	3	5	0–4 SU	—	5–4
3	Nazira Marsbek Kyzy (KGZ)	2	0	2	1	4	0–4 SU	1–3 PO1	—

Source: UWW

Semifinals
Altantsetsegiin Battsetseg (MGL)	5
Madina Bakbergenova (KAZ)	1
Sarita Mor (IND)	10
Yumi Kon (JPN)	3

Final
Altantsetsegiin Battsetseg (MGL)	2
Sarita Mor (IND)	3
Bronze medal
Madina Bakbergenova (KAZ)	2^{F}
Yumi Kon (JPN)	0

=== 62 kg ===
21 February

Quarterfinals		Semifinals		Final
Ayaulym Kassymova (KAZ)	14^{F}
Nguyễn Thị Mỹ Hạnh (VIE)	4	Ayaulym Kassymova (KAZ)	4^{F}
Pürveegiin Nomin-Erdene (MGL)	6^{F}	Pürveegiin Nomin-Erdene (MGL)	0
Ariukhan Jumabaeva (UZB)	0			Ayaulym Kassymova (KAZ)	1
Lee Han-bit (KOR)	0			Yukako Kawai (JPN)	5
Sonam Malik (IND)	11^{F}	Sonam Malik (IND)	2
Yukako Kawai (JPN)	6	Yukako Kawai (JPN)	5
Aisuluu Tynybekova (KGZ)	1

Bronze medals
Nguyễn Thị Mỹ Hạnh (VIE)	1
Pürveegiin Nomin-Erdene (MGL)	4^{F}
Aisuluu Tynybekova (KGZ)	11
Sonam Malik (IND)	0

=== 65 kg ===
21 February

Pos	Athlete	Pld	W	L	CP	TP	JPN	IND	KOR
1	Naomi Ruike (JPN)	2	2	0	7	13	—	2–1	11–0
2	Sakshi Malik (IND)	2	1	1	5	15	1–3 PO1	—	14–4
3	Ha Oh-young (KOR)	2	0	2	1	4	0–4 SU	1–4 SU1	—

Source: UWW

Pos	Athlete	Pld	W	L	CP	TP	UZB	MGL	KAZ
1	Nabira Esenbaeva (UZB)	2	2	0	6	10	—	6–4	4–0
2	Zorigtyn Bolortungalag (MGL)	2	1	1	6	16	1–3 PO1	—	12–2 Fall
3	Gaukhar Mukatay (KAZ)	2	0	2	0	2	0–3 PO	0–5 FA	—

Source: UWW

Semifinals
Naomi Ruike (JPN)	11^{F}
Zorigtyn Bolortungalag (MGL)	3
Nabira Esenbaeva (UZB)	4
Sakshi Malik (IND)	5

Final
Naomi Ruike (JPN)	2
Sakshi Malik (IND)	0
Bronze medal
Zorigtyn Bolortungalag (MGL)	7
Nabira Esenbaeva (UZB)	4

=== 68 kg ===
20 February

Pos	Athlete	Pld	W	L	CP	TP	IND	JPN	MGL	UZB	KAZ
1	Divya Kakran (IND)	4	4	0	20	31	—	6–4 Fall	11–2 Fall	8–0 Fall	6–0 Fall
2	Naruha Matsuyuki (JPN)	4	3	1	12	35	0–5 FA	—	11–0	10–0	10–0
3	Enkhsaikhany Delgermaa (MGL)	4	2	2	9	23	0–5 FA	0–4 SU	—	3–0 Fall	18–6
4	Azoda Esbergenova (UZB)	4	1	3	3	13	0–5 FA	0–4 SU	0–5 FA	—	13–12
5	Albina Kairgeldinova (KAZ)	4	0	4	2	18	0–5 FA	0–4 SU	1–4 SU1	1–3 PO1	—

Source: UWW

=== 72 kg ===
21 February

Pos	Athlete	Pld	W	L	CP	TP	KAZ	IND	UZB
1	Zhamila Bakbergenova (KAZ)	2	2	0	8	13	—	7–4	6–0 Fall
2	Gursharan Preet Kaur (IND)	2	1	1	5	14	1–3 PO1	—	10–0
3	Svetlana Oknazarova (UZB)	2	0	2	0	0	0–5 FA	0–4 SU	—

Source: UWW

Pos	Athlete	Pld	W	L	CP	TP	JPN	MGL	KOR
1	Mei Shindo (JPN)	2	2	0	7	16	—	5–1	11–0
2	Enkhbayaryn Tsevegmid (MGL)	2	1	1	6	7	1–3 PO1	—	6–0 Fall
3	Yun Do-kyung (KOR)	2	0	2	0	0	0–4 SU	0–5 FA	—

Source: UWW

Semifinals
Zhamila Bakbergenova (KAZ)	10
Enkhbayaryn Tsevegmid (MGL)	0
Mei Shindo (JPN)	12^{F}
Gursharan Preet Kaur (IND)	1

Final
Zhamila Bakbergenova (KAZ)	2
Mei Shindo (JPN)	1
Bronze medal
Enkhbayaryn Tsevegmid (MGL)	2
Gursharan Preet Kaur (IND)	5

=== 76 kg ===
20 February

Pos	Athlete	Pld	W	L	CP	TP	KAZ	MGL	IND	VIE
1	Elmira Syzdykova (KAZ)	3	3	0	13	15	—	4–0 Fall	6–6	5–1 Fall
2	Ganbatyn Ariunjargal (MGL)	3	2	1	10	5	0–5 FA	—	3–4 Fall	2–4 Fall
3	Kiran Bishnoi (IND)	3	1	2	4	14	1–3 PO1	0–5 FA	—	4–2
4	Đặng Thị Linh (VIE)	3	0	3	1	7	0–5 FA	0–5 FA	1–3 PO1	—

Source: UWW

Pos	Athlete	Pld	W	L	CP	TP	JPN	KGZ	UZB
1	Hiroe Minagawa (JPN)	2	2	0	7	15	—	3–0	12–1
2	Aiperi Medet Kyzy (KGZ)	2	1	1	4	11	0–3 PO	—	11–0
3	Mukhlisa Normuminova (UZB)	2	0	2	1	1	1–4 SU1	0–4 SU	—

Source: UWW

Semifinals
Elmira Syzdykova (KAZ)	1
Aiperi Medet Kyzy (KGZ)	4^{F}
Hiroe Minagawa (JPN)	5^{F}
Ganbatyn Ariunjargal (MGL)	0

Final
Aiperi Medet Kyzy (KGZ)	1
Hiroe Minagawa (JPN)	4
Bronze medal
Elmira Syzdykova (KAZ)	7^{F}
Ganbatyn Ariunjargal (MGL)	0
