= Wrestling at the 2017 Asian Indoor and Martial Arts Games =

- Venue: Ashgabat Main Indoor Arena
- Dates: 24–26 September 2017

Wrestling was contested at the 2017 Asian Indoor and Martial Arts Games in Ashgabat, Turkmenistan from 24 September to 26 September 2017. The competition took place at Ashgabat Main Indoor Arena.

== Medalists ==
=== Men's freestyle ===
| Event | Gold | Silver | Bronze |
|---|---|---|---|
| 57 kg | Makhmudjon Shavkatov; Uzbekistan | Gabit Tolepbay; Kazakhstan | Nader Hajiaghania; Iran |
| 57 kg | Makhmudjon Shavkatov; Uzbekistan | Gabit Tolepbay; Kazakhstan | Kazuya Koyanagi; Japan |
| 61 kg | Iman Sadeghi; Iran | Saparmyrat Myradow; Turkmenistan | Mekan Orazow; Turkmenistan |
| 61 kg | Iman Sadeghi; Iran | Saparmyrat Myradow; Turkmenistan | Sandeep Tomar; India |
| 65 kg | Bajrang Punia; India | Daichi Takatani; Japan | Farzad Amouzad; Iran |
| 65 kg | Bajrang Punia; India | Daichi Takatani; Japan | Batyr Borjakow; Turkmenistan |
| 70 kg | Adam Batirov; Bahrain | Batyr Orazgylyjow; Turkmenistan | Ikhtiyor Navruzov; Uzbekistan |
| 70 kg | Adam Batirov; Bahrain | Batyr Orazgylyjow; Turkmenistan | Saeid Dadashpour; Iran |
| 74 kg | Bekzod Abdurakhmonov; Uzbekistan | Hossein Eliasi; Iran | Zhiger Zakirov; Kazakhstan |
| 74 kg | Bekzod Abdurakhmonov; Uzbekistan | Hossein Eliasi; Iran | Döwletmyrat Orazgylyjow; Turkmenistan |
| 86 kg | Ezzatollah Akbari; Iran | Umidjon Ismanov; Uzbekistan | Adilet Davlumbayev; Kazakhstan |
| 86 kg | Ezzatollah Akbari; Iran | Umidjon Ismanov; Uzbekistan | Deepak Punia; India |
| 97 kg | Mojtaba Goleij; Iran | Rustam Iskandari; Tajikistan | Noor Ahmad Ahmadi; Afghanistan |
| 97 kg | Mojtaba Goleij; Iran | Rustam Iskandari; Tajikistan | Bakdaulet Almentay; Kazakhstan |
| 125 kg | Davit Modzmanashvili; Uzbekistan | Wurenbilige; China | Yadollah Mohebbi; Iran |
| 125 kg | Davit Modzmanashvili; Uzbekistan | Wurenbilige; China | Raja Al-Karrad; Syria |

=== Men's Greco-Roman ===
| Event | Gold | Silver | Bronze |
|---|---|---|---|
| 59 kg | Kaly Sulaimanov; Kyrgyzstan | Mohsen Hajipour; Iran | Islomjon Bakhromov; Uzbekistan |
| 59 kg | Kaly Sulaimanov; Kyrgyzstan | Mohsen Hajipour; Iran | Aidos Sultangali; Kazakhstan |
| 66 kg | Daniyar Kalenov; Kazakhstan | Amin Souri; Iran | Yamato Ui; Japan |
| 66 kg | Daniyar Kalenov; Kazakhstan | Amin Souri; Iran | Elmurat Tasmuradov; Uzbekistan |
| 71 kg | Farshad Belfakkeh; Iran | Ali Seýhow; Turkmenistan | Mustafa Hussaini; Afghanistan |
| 71 kg | Farshad Belfakkeh; Iran | Ali Seýhow; Turkmenistan | Aram Vardanyan; Uzbekistan |
| 75 kg | Pejman Poshtam; Iran | Zhang Ridong; China | Gurpreet Singh; India |
| 75 kg | Pejman Poshtam; Iran | Zhang Ridong; China | Tamerlan Shadukayev; Kazakhstan |
| 80 kg | Mehdi Ebrahimi; Iran | Atabek Azisbekov; Kyrgyzstan | Sukhrob Abdulkhaev; Tajikistan |
| 80 kg | Mehdi Ebrahimi; Iran | Atabek Azisbekov; Kyrgyzstan | Askhat Dilmukhamedov; Kazakhstan |
| 85 kg | Saman Azizi; Iran | Ravinder Khatri; India | Şyhazberdi Öwelekow; Turkmenistan |
| 85 kg | Saman Azizi; Iran | Ravinder Khatri; India | Khussein Mutsolgov; Kazakhstan |
| 98 kg | Amir Hossein Hosseini; Iran | Uzur Dzhuzupbekov; Kyrgyzstan | Mirzoamin Safarov; Tajikistan |
| 98 kg | Amir Hossein Hosseini; Iran | Uzur Dzhuzupbekov; Kyrgyzstan | Yuta Nara; Japan |
| 130 kg | Behnam Mehdizadeh; Iran | Naveen Sevlia; India | Nurmakhan Tinaliyev; Kazakhstan |
| 130 kg | Behnam Mehdizadeh; Iran | Naveen Sevlia; India | Muminjon Abdullaev; Uzbekistan |

=== Women's freestyle ===
| Event | Gold | Silver | Bronze |
|---|---|---|---|
| 48 kg | Sun Yanan; China | Miho Igarashi; Japan | Dauletbike Yakhshimuratova; Uzbekistan |
| 48 kg | Sun Yanan; China | Miho Igarashi; Japan | Sheetal Tomar; India |
| 53 kg | Yuka Yago; Japan | Zhuldyz Eshimova; Kazakhstan | Sevara Eshmuratova; Uzbekistan |
| 53 kg | Yuka Yago; Japan | Zhuldyz Eshimova; Kazakhstan | Luo Lannuan; China |
| 58 kg | Pei Xingru; China | Aisuluu Tynybekova; Kyrgyzstan | Akie Hanai; Japan |
| 58 kg | Pei Xingru; China | Aisuluu Tynybekova; Kyrgyzstan | Pooja Dhanda; India |
| 63 kg | Xu Rui; China | Ayaulym Kassymova; Kazakhstan | Yurika Ito; Japan |
| 63 kg | Xu Rui; China | Ayaulym Kassymova; Kazakhstan | Nguyễn Thị Vinh; Vietnam |
| 69 kg | Zhou Feng; China | Elmira Syzdykova; Kazakhstan | Meerim Zhumanazarova; Kyrgyzstan |
| 69 kg | Zhou Feng; China | Elmira Syzdykova; Kazakhstan | Navjot Kaur; India |
| 75 kg | Paliha; China | Gulmaral Yerkebayeva; Kazakhstan | Natsumi Baba; Japan |
| 75 kg | Paliha; China | Gulmaral Yerkebayeva; Kazakhstan | Aiperi Medet Kyzy; Kyrgyzstan |

== Medal table ==
| Rank | Nation | Gold | Silver | Bronze | Total |
|---|---|---|---|---|---|
| 1 | Iran (IRI) | 9 | 3 | 4 | 16 |
| 2 | China (CHN) | 5 | 2 | 1 | 8 |
| 3 | Uzbekistan (UZB) | 3 | 1 | 7 | 11 |
| 4 | Kazakhstan (KAZ) | 1 | 5 | 8 | 14 |
| 5 | Kyrgyzstan (KGZ) | 1 | 3 | 2 | 6 |
| 6 | India (IND) | 1 | 2 | 6 | 9 |
| 6 | Japan (JPN) | 1 | 2 | 6 | 9 |
| 8 | Bahrain (BRN) | 1 | 0 | 0 | 1 |
| 9 | Turkmenistan (TKM) | 0 | 3 | 4 | 7 |
| 10 | Tajikistan (TJK) | 0 | 1 | 2 | 3 |
| 11 | Afghanistan (AFG) | 0 | 0 | 2 | 2 |
| 12 | Syria (SYR) | 0 | 0 | 1 | 1 |
| 12 | Vietnam (VIE) | 0 | 0 | 1 | 1 |
| Totals (13 entries) | | 22 | 22 | 44 | 88 |

== Results ==
=== Men's freestyle ===
==== 57 kg ====
24 September

1/16 finals
| Berdi Atabaýew (TKM) | 0–10 | Zou Wanhao (CHN) |
| Jawed Rahimi (AFG) | 10–0 | Alvin Lobreguito (PHI) |
| Makhmudjon Shavkatov (UZB) | 10–0 | Eddy Khidzer (SGP) |

1/8 finals
Meretmuhammet Ataýew (TKM) | 4
Gabit Tolepbay (KAZ) | 7
Eko Roni Saputra (INA) | 10
Petrus Palm (AUS) | 0
Nader Hajiaghania (IRI) | 10
Hamidullah Abdullah (AFG) | 2^{R}
Ulukbek Zholdoshbekov (KGZ) | 9
Dzhamshed Sharifov (TJK) | 4
Drake Torres (GUM) | 10^{F}
Kemmy Betwell (MHL) | 4
Kazuya Koyanagi (JPN) | 12
Muhammad Bilal (PAK) | 1
Charles Fernando (SRI) | 0
Zou Wanhao (CHN) | 11
Jawed Rahimi (AFG) | 2
Makhmudjon Shavkatov (UZB) | 10

Quarterfinals
Gabit Tolepbay (KAZ) | 8
Eko Roni Saputra (INA) | 3
Nader Hajiaghania (IRI) | 18
Ulukbek Zholdoshbekov (KGZ) | 14
Drake Torres (GUM) | 0
Kazuya Koyanagi (JPN) | 10
Zou Wanhao (CHN) | 4
Makhmudjon Shavkatov (UZB) | 12

Semifinals
Gabit Tolepbay (KAZ) | 4^{F}
Nader Hajiaghania (IRI) | 0
Kazuya Koyanagi (JPN) | 2
Makhmudjon Shavkatov (UZB) | 10

Final
Gabit Tolepbay (KAZ) | 2
Makhmudjon Shavkatov (UZB) | 6

Repechage round 1
Eddy Khidzer (SGP) | 0
Jawed Rahimi (AFG) | 10

Repechage round 2
Meretmuhammet Ataýew (TKM) | 10
Eko Roni Saputra (INA) | 0
Jawed Rahimi (AFG) | 4
Zou Wanhao (CHN) | 4

Repechage bronze
Meretmuhammet Ataýew (TKM) | 2
Nader Hajiaghania (IRI) | 6
Zou Wanhao (CHN) | 5
Kazuya Koyanagi (JPN) | 10

==== 61 kg ====
25 September

1/8 finals
Zubaidullah Timori (AFG) | 4^{F}
Cristian Nicolescu (PLW) | 0
Alibek Osmonov (KGZ) | 10
Ahmad Shahir Omary (AFG) | 0
Ethan Aguigui (GUM) | 0
Timur Aitkulov (KAZ) | 10
Lowe Bingham (NRU) | 0
Rustam Ramazonov (TJK) | 10
Iman Sadeghi (IRI) | 4
Sandeep Tomar (IND) | 2

Quarterfinals
Mekan Orazow (TKM) | 2
Saparmyrat Myradow (TKM) | 8
Abdul Wahab (PAK) | 11
Zubaidullah Timori (AFG) | 0
Alibek Osmonov (KGZ) | 4
Timur Aitkulov (KAZ) | 8
Rustam Ramazonov (TJK)
Iman Sadeghi (IRI) | WO

Semifinals
Saparmyrat Myradow (TKM) | 11
Abdul Wahab (PAK) | 6
Timur Aitkulov (KAZ) | 2
Iman Sadeghi (IRI) | 7

Final
Saparmyrat Myradow (TKM) | 0
Iman Sadeghi (IRI) | 11

Repechage round 1
Sandeep Tomar (IND) | WO
Rustam Ramazonov (TJK)

Repechage bronze
Mekan Orazow (TKM) | 12
Abdul Wahab (PAK) | 4
Sandeep Tomar (IND) | 5^{F}
Timur Aitkulov (KAZ) | 9

==== 65 kg ====
24 September

1/8 finals
Mir Aqa Rahimi (AFG) | 0
Abdulqosim Fayziev (TJK) | 10
Aji Hakiki (INA) | 10
Maverick Kun (NRU) | 0
Bajrang Punia (IND) | 12
Jarvis Tarkong (PLW) | 1
Farzad Amouzad (IRI) | 8
Yeerlanbieke Katai (CHN) | 6
Tilek Sharsheev (KGZ) | 12^{F}
Jhonny Morte (PHI) | 2
Batyr Borjakow (TKM) | 10
Liam Neyland (AUS) | 0
Bökebaý Annaýew (TKM) | 2
Saidzhon Amirdzhon (TJK) | 8
Amandyk Bakeyev (KAZ) | 2
Daichi Takatani (JPN) | 12

Quarterfinals
Abdulqosim Fayziev (TJK) | 10
Aji Hakiki (INA) | 0
Bajrang Punia (IND) | 13
Farzad Amouzad (IRI) | 8
Tilek Sharsheev (KGZ) | 3
Batyr Borjakow (TKM) | 11
Saidzhon Amirdzhon (TJK) | 6
Daichi Takatani (JPN) | 10^{F}

Semifinals
Abdulqosim Fayziev (TJK) | 1
Bajrang Punia (IND) | 12^{F}
Batyr Borjakow (TKM) | 2
Daichi Takatani (JPN) | 12

Final
Bajrang Punia (IND) | WO
Daichi Takatani (JPN)

Repechage round 1
Jarvis Tarkong (PLW) | 0
Farzad Amouzad (IRI) | 10
Amandyk Bakeyev (KAZ) | 6^{F}
Saidzhon Amirdzhon (TJK) | 0

Repechage bronze
Farzad Amouzad (IRI) | 3
Abdulqosim Fayziev (TJK) | 0
Amandyk Bakeyev (KAZ) | 5
Batyr Borjakow (TKM) | 15

==== 70 kg ====
25 September

1/8 finals
Daniel Misaalefua (ASA) | 0
Adam Batirov (BRN) | 10
Gulomdzhon Sharipov (TJK) | 0
Saeid Dadashpour (IRI) | 10
Alawedin Shamsi (AFG) | 8
Malik Jan Sadeed (AFG) | 12^{F}
Yazan Eawaid (JOR) | 0
Orazberdi Şaberdiýew (TKM) | 11

Quarterfinals
Elaman Dogdurbek Uulu (KGZ) | 1
Ikhtiyor Navruzov (UZB) | 3
Boldkhüügiin Sükhbat (MGL) | 0
Batyr Orazgylyjow (TKM) | 10
Adam Batirov (BRN) | 4
Saeid Dadashpour (IRI) | 4
Malik Jan Sadeed (AFG) | 5
Orazberdi Şaberdiýew (TKM) | 2

Semifinals
Ikhtiyor Navruzov (UZB) | 2
Batyr Orazgylyjow (TKM) | 12
Adam Batirov (BRN) | 10
Malik Jan Sadeed (AFG) | 0

Final
Batyr Orazgylyjow (TKM) | 4
Adam Batirov (BRN) | 8

Repechage round 1
Daniel Misaalefua (ASA) | 0
Saeid Dadashpour (IRI) | 10

Repechage bronze
Boldkhüügiin Sükhbat (MGL) | 2
Ikhtiyor Navruzov (UZB) | 12
Saeid Dadashpour (IRI) | 10^{F}
Malik Jan Sadeed (AFG) | 0

==== 74 kg ====
24 September

1/16 finals
| Connor Evans (AUS) | 2–12 | Döwletmyrat Orazgylyjow (TKM) |
| Bekzod Abdurakhmonov (UZB) | 11–0 | Isaiah Kramer (MHL) |
| Farhad Malikzada (AFG) | 10–0 | Sealiitu Mauga (ASA) |
| Suthija Maduranga (SRI) | 0–10 | Şähergeldi Saparmyradow (TKM) |
| Pita Fanolua (ASA) | 0–10 | Azamat Sufiev (TJK) |

1/8 finals
Menghejigan (CHN) | 6
Tsubasa Asai (JPN) | 5
Skarlee Renguul (PLW) | 0
Hossein Eliasi (IRI) | 11
Mohammad Nour Al-Asbahi (JOR) | 19
Ryan Ifamilik (FSM) | 15
Zhiger Zakirov (KAZ) | 10
Abdul Ghafar Qaderi (AFG) | 0
Muslim Evloev (KGZ) | 10
Layth Abushraim (PLE) | 0
John Rojas (GUM) | 0
Döwletmyrat Orazgylyjow (TKM) | 10
Bekzod Abdurakhmonov (UZB) | 12
Farhad Malikzada (AFG) | 2
Şähergeldi Saparmyradow (TKM) | 6
Azamat Sufiev (TJK) | 7

Quarterfinals
Menghejigan (CHN) | 4
Hossein Eliasi (IRI) | 9
Mohammad Nour Al-Asbahi (JOR) | 0
Zhiger Zakirov (KAZ) | 10
Muslim Evloev (KGZ) | 6
Döwletmyrat Orazgylyjow (TKM) | 9
Bekzod Abdurakhmonov (UZB) | 4^{F}
Azamat Sufiev (TJK) | 0

Semifinals
Hossein Eliasi (IRI) | 10
Zhiger Zakirov (KAZ) | 0
Döwletmyrat Orazgylyjow (TKM) | 0
Bekzod Abdurakhmonov (UZB) | 10

Final
Hossein Eliasi (IRI) | 6
Bekzod Abdurakhmonov (UZB) | 12

Repechage round 1
Isaiah Kramer (MHL)
Farhad Malikzada (AFG) | WO

Repechage round 2
Skarlee Renguul (PLW) | 0
Menghejigan (CHN) | 10^{F}
Farhad Malikzada (AFG) | 12
Azamat Sufiev (TJK) | 8

Repechage bronze
Menghejigan (CHN) | 4
Zhiger Zakirov (KAZ) | 12
Farhad Malikzada (AFG) | 0
Döwletmyrat Orazgylyjow (TKM) | 10

==== 86 kg ====
25 September

1/16 finals
| Abdul Haia Faqiri (AFG) | 0–10 | Baktyiar Karagul Uulu (KGZ) |
| Takahiro Murayama (JPN) | 0–3 | Didar Baýramow (TKM) |
| Selimmuhammet Muhadyýew (TKM) | 10–0 | Benjamin Teo (SGP) |

1/8 finals
Isaiah Ignacio (GUM) | 0
Adilet Davlumbayev (KAZ) | 11
Paulo Luna (GUM) | 14
Myron Damian (FSM) | 19
Muhammad Inam (PAK) | 11
Nolan Puletasi (ASA) | 0
Lin Zushen (CHN) | 3
Ezzatollah Akbari (IRI) | 13
Umidjon Ismanov (UZB) | 10^{F}
Salim Khodzhaev (TJK) | 0
Bakhodur Kadirov (TJK) | 11
Iafeta Vou (ASA) | 0
Deepak Punia (IND) | 5^{F}
Baktyiar Karagul Uulu (KGZ) | 1
Didar Baýramow (TKM) | 0
Selimmuhammet Muhadyýew (TKM) | 10

Quarterfinals
Adilet Davlumbayev (KAZ) | 10
Myron Damian (FSM) | 0
Muhammad Inam (PAK) | 2
Ezzatollah Akbari (IRI) | 6
Umidjon Ismanov (UZB) | 6
Bakhodur Kadirov (TJK) | 0
Deepak Punia (IND) | 4^{F}
Selimmuhammet Muhadyýew (TKM) | 1

Semifinals
Adilet Davlumbayev (KAZ) | 8
Ezzatollah Akbari (IRI) | 16
Umidjon Ismanov (UZB) | 8
Deepak Punia (IND) | 0

Final
Ezzatollah Akbari (IRI) | 9
Umidjon Ismanov (UZB) | 2

Repechage round 2
Lin Zushen (CHN) | 0
Muhammad Inam (PAK) | 4^{F}
Salim Khodzhaev (TJK)
Bakhodur Kadirov (TJK) | WO

Repechage bronze
Muhammad Inam (PAK) | 5
Adilet Davlumbayev (KAZ) | 8
Bakhodur Kadirov (TJK) | 2
Deepak Punia (IND) | 2

==== 97 kg ====
24 September

1/8 finals
Noor Ahmad Ahmadi (AFG) | 10
Firuz Yakubov (TJK) | 0
Mojtaba Goleij (IRI) | 8
Yang Chaoqiang (CHN) | 1
Sardar Wali Naderi (AFG) | 0
Rustam Iskandari (TJK) | 10
Takashi Ishiguro (JPN) | 12
Söhbet Belliýew (TKM) | 8
Satyawart Kadian (IND) | 6^{F}
Chinbatyn Altangerel (MGL) | 0
Arzuubek Karybekov (KGZ) | 0
Bakdaulet Almentay (KAZ) | 5

Quarterfinals
Ýusup Melejaýew (TKM) | 11
Henri Burns (TAH) | 0
Noor Ahmad Ahmadi (AFG) | 1
Mojtaba Goleij (IRI) | 4
Rustam Iskandari (TJK) | 11
Takashi Ishiguro (JPN) | 0
Satyawart Kadian (IND) | 4
Bakdaulet Almentay (KAZ) | 4

Semifinals
Ýusup Melejaýew (TKM) | 3
Mojtaba Goleij (IRI) | 14
Rustam Iskandari (TJK) | 12
Bakdaulet Almentay (KAZ) | 10

Final
Mojtaba Goleij (IRI) | 10
Rustam Iskandari (TJK) | 0

Repechage round 1
Yang Chaoqiang (CHN) | 0
Noor Ahmad Ahmadi (AFG) | 5
Sardar Wali Naderi (AFG) | 0
Takashi Ishiguro (JPN) | 10

Repechage bronze
Noor Ahmad Ahmadi (AFG) | 5
Ýusup Melejaýew (TKM) | 0
Takashi Ishiguro (JPN) | 0
Bakdaulet Almentay (KAZ) | 5

==== 125 kg ====
25 September

1/8 finals
Davit Modzmanashvili (UZB) | 10
Farkhod Anakulov (TJK) | 0
Yadollah Mohebbi (IRI) | 11
Ahmed Salah (IRQ) | 0
Atajan Rozykulyýew (TKM) | 1
Sumit Malik (IND) | 5
Daulet Shabanbay (KAZ) | 10
Nasir Ahmad Sardarzada (AFG) | 0
Florian Skilang Temengil (PLW) | 3
Raja Al-Karrad (SYR) | 9
Tetsuya Tanaka (JPN) | 10
Zena Iese (ASA) | 0
Wurenbilige (CHN) | 10
Ýazmyrat Gökjäýew (TKM) | 0
Fakhriddini Salimzoda (TJK) | 14
Mushtaq Hussain Khaliqi (AFG) | 11

Quarterfinals
Davit Modzmanashvili (UZB) | 2
Yadollah Mohebbi (IRI) | 1
Sumit Malik (IND) | 2
Daulet Shabanbay (KAZ) | 2
Raja Al-Karrad (SYR) | 10
Tetsuya Tanaka (JPN) | 0
Wurenbilige (CHN) | 2^{F}
Fakhriddini Salimzoda (TJK) | 0

Semifinals
Davit Modzmanashvili (UZB) | 3
Daulet Shabanbay (KAZ) | 1
Raja Al-Karrad (SYR) | 0
Wurenbilige (CHN) | 8^{F}

Final
Davit Modzmanashvili (UZB) | 8
Wurenbilige (CHN) | 0

Repechage round 1
Farkhod Anakulov (TJK) | 4
Yadollah Mohebbi (IRI) | 14
Ýazmyrat Gökjäýew (TKM) | 7
Fakhriddini Salimzoda (TJK) | 4^{R}

Repechage bronze
Yadollah Mohebbi (IRI) | 10
Daulet Shabanbay (KAZ) | 6
Ýazmyrat Gökjäýew (TKM) | 0
Raja Al-Karrad (SYR) | 10

- Ahmed Salah of Iraq originally finished 16th, but was disqualified after he tested positive for Methasterone.

=== Men's Greco-Roman ===
==== 59 kg ====
26 September

1/8 finals
Mohsen Hajipour (IRI) | 2
Islomjon Bakhromov (UZB) | 1
Obaidullah Kakar (AFG) | 1
Hamdian Rachmat Mubaroq (INA) | 2
Kaly Sulaimanov (KGZ) | 5
Karrar Abbas (IRQ) | 4
Azhar Hussain (PAK) | 0
Aidos Sultangali (KAZ) | 8
Gyanender Dahiya (IND) | 4
Hiroki Kuwayama (JPN) | 2
Tuo Erbatu (CHN) | 10
Merdan Allaýarow (TKM) | 0

Quarterfinals
Michael Jay Cater (PHI) | 0
Seýdylla Täzäýew (TKM) | 8
Mohsen Hajipour (IRI) | 8
Hamdian Rachmat Mubaroq (INA) | 0
Kaly Sulaimanov (KGZ) | 12^{F}
Aidos Sultangali (KAZ) | 8
Gyanender Dahiya (IND) | 2
Tuo Erbatu (CHN) | 3

Semifinals
Seýdylla Täzäýew (TKM) | 1
Mohsen Hajipour (IRI) | 5
Kaly Sulaimanov (KGZ) | 10
Tuo Erbatu (CHN) | 0

Final
Mohsen Hajipour (IRI) | 1
Kaly Sulaimanov (KGZ) | 3

Repechage round 1
Islomjon Bakhromov (UZB) | 8
Hamdian Rachmat Mubaroq (INA) | 0
Karrar Abbas (IRQ) | 3
Aidos Sultangali (KAZ) | 4

Repechage bronze
Islomjon Bakhromov (UZB) | 4
Seýdylla Täzäýew (TKM) | 1
Aidos Sultangali (KAZ) | 6
Tuo Erbatu (CHN) | 5

==== 66 kg ====
26 September

1/8 finals
Yamato Ui (JPN) | 12
Jonathan Maquilan (PHI) | 0
Mohammed Abbas (IRQ) | 8
Cristian Nicolescu (PLW) | 0
Elmurat Tasmuradov (UZB) | 14
Mansur Nurberdiýew (TKM) | 8
Dong Jinxin (CHN) | 4
Nurbek Abduganiev (KGZ) | 3
Hoşgeldi Nobatmyradow (TKM) | 0
Daniyar Kalenov (KAZ) | 5

Quarterfinals
Amin Souri (IRI) | 9
Ahmad Dahshan (JOR) | 0
Shoukat Ali (PAK) | 0
Yamato Ui (JPN) | 10
Mohammed Abbas (IRQ) | 0
Elmurat Tasmuradov (UZB) | 6
Dong Jinxin (CHN) | 0
Daniyar Kalenov (KAZ) | 8

Semifinals
Amin Souri (IRI) | 2
Yamato Ui (JPN) | 2
Elmurat Tasmuradov (UZB) | 1
Daniyar Kalenov (KAZ) | 2

Final
Amin Souri (IRI) | 1
Daniyar Kalenov (KAZ) | 2

Repechage round 1
Hoşgeldi Nobatmyradow (TKM) | 1
Dong Jinxin (CHN) | 7

Repechage bronze
Ahmad Dahshan (JOR) | 0
Yamato Ui (JPN) | 10
Dong Jinxin (CHN) | 2
Elmurat Tasmuradov (UZB) | 6

==== 71 kg ====
26 September

1/8 finals
Taha Yaseen (IRQ) | 9
Richard Nakasone (FSM) | 1
Aram Vardanyan (UZB) | 3
Jeýhun Öwezdurdyýew (TKM) | 3
Sayfullo Sultonshokhi (TJK) | 8
Brian Akbar Prahara (INA) | 0
Ruslan Tsarev (KGZ) | 1
Farshad Belfakkeh (IRI) | 4

Quarterfinals
Mustafa Hussaini (AFG) | 11
Jarvis Tarkong (PLW) | 2
Ali Seýhow (TKM) | 8
Daniel Misaalefua (ASA) | 0
Taha Yaseen (IRQ) | 2
Aram Vardanyan (UZB) | 5
Sayfullo Sultonshokhi (TJK) | 0
Farshad Belfakkeh (IRI) | 9

Semifinals
Mustafa Hussaini (AFG) | 1
Ali Seýhow (TKM) | 6
Aram Vardanyan (UZB) | 1
Farshad Belfakkeh (IRI) | 4

Final
Ali Seýhow (TKM) | 2
Farshad Belfakkeh (IRI) | 11

Repechage round 1
Ruslan Tsarev (KGZ) | 8
Sayfullo Sultonshokhi (TJK) | 0

Repechage bronze
Daniel Misaalefua (ASA) | 0
Mustafa Hussaini (AFG) | 8^{F}
Ruslan Tsarev (KGZ) | 2
Aram Vardanyan (UZB) | 3

==== 75 kg ====
26 September

1/16 finals
| Mohamad Mcheik (LBN) | 0–8 | Pejman Poshtam (IRI) |

1/8 finals
Rudi Suandi Syafei (INA) | 2
Sultan Ali Eid (JOR) | 9^{F}
Bakhtovar Khasanov (TJK) | 10
Abdyresul Hümmiýew (TKM) | 7
Zhang Ridong (CHN) | 4
Gurpreet Singh (IND) | 1
Thomas Wichilbuch (FSM) | 0
Kodai Sakuraba (JPN) | 8
Tamerlan Shadukayev (KAZ) | 14
Şermet Permanow (TKM) | 11
Kairatbek Tugolbaev (KGZ) | 11
Sealiitu Mauga (ASA) | 0
Hashmatullah Malikkhil (AFG) | 9^{F}
Skarlee Renguul (PLW) | 0
Jefferson Manatad (PHI) | 0
Pejman Poshtam (IRI) | 8

Quarterfinals
Sultan Ali Eid (JOR) | 0
Bakhtovar Khasanov (TJK) | 7^{C}
Zhang Ridong (CHN) | 7
Kodai Sakuraba (JPN) | 2
Tamerlan Shadukayev (KAZ) | 10
Kairatbek Tugolbaev (KGZ) | 8
Hashmatullah Malikkhil (AFG) | 1
Pejman Poshtam (IRI) | 11

Semifinals
Bakhtovar Khasanov (TJK) | 1
Zhang Ridong (CHN) | 6
Tamerlan Shadukayev (KAZ) | 4
Pejman Poshtam (IRI) | 8

Final
Zhang Ridong (CHN) | 1
Pejman Poshtam (IRI) | 3

Repechage round 1
Mohamad Mcheik (LBN) | 8
Jefferson Manatad (PHI) | 0

Repechage round 2
Gurpreet Singh (IND) | 4
Kodai Sakuraba (JPN) | 2
Mohamad Mcheik (LBN) | 10
Hashmatullah Malikkhil (AFG) | 16

Repechage bronze
Gurpreet Singh (IND) | 14
Bakhtovar Khasanov (TJK) | 5
Hashmatullah Malikkhil (AFG) | 0
Tamerlan Shadukayev (KAZ) | 8

==== 80 kg ====
26 September

| Quarterfinals | | Semifinals | | Final |
| Nepes Kakaliýew (TKM) | 1 |
| Sukhrob Abdulkhaev (TJK) | 10 | Sukhrob Abdulkhaev (TJK) | 1 |
| Amanaly Ataýew (TKM) | 0 | Atabek Azisbekov (KGZ) | 6 |
| Atabek Azisbekov (KGZ) | 4 | | | Atabek Azisbekov (KGZ) | 2 |
| Askhat Dilmukhamedov (KAZ) | 2 | | | Mehdi Ebrahimi (IRI) | 3 |
| Mehdi Ebrahimi (IRI) | 3 | Mehdi Ebrahimi (IRI) | 7 |
| Nurbek Khashimbekov (UZB) | 10 | Nurbek Khashimbekov (UZB) | 0 |
| Baryalai Nazari (AFG) | 0 |

Repechage bronze
Amanaly Ataýew (TKM) | 1
Sukhrob Abdulkhaev (TJK) | 4
Askhat Dilmukhamedov (KAZ) | 5^{F}
Nurbek Khashimbekov (UZB) | 1

==== 85 kg ====
26 September

1/8 finals
Khussein Mutsolgov (KAZ) | 5
Peng Fei (CHN) | 0
Saman Azizi (IRI) | 3
Şageldi Annaýew (TKM) | 1

Quarterfinals
Şyhazberdi Öwelekow (TKM) | 4^{F}
Mohammad Dawood Sultani (AFG) | 0
Ravinder Khatri (IND) | 8
Nolan Puletasi (ASA) | 0
Azat Beishebekov (KGZ) | 2
Kanta Shiokawa (JPN) | 0
Khussein Mutsolgov (KAZ) | 1
Saman Azizi (IRI) | 7

Semifinals
Şyhazberdi Öwelekow (TKM) | 1
Ravinder Khatri (IND) | 3
Azat Beishebekov (KGZ) | 1
Saman Azizi (IRI) | 1

Final
Ravinder Khatri (IND) | 1
Saman Azizi (IRI) | 4

Repechage round 1
Şageldi Annaýew (TKM) | 4
Khussein Mutsolgov (KAZ) | 12

Repechage bronze
Nolan Puletasi (ASA) | 0
Şyhazberdi Öwelekow (TKM) | 8
Khussein Mutsolgov (KAZ) | 4
Azat Beishebekov (KGZ) | 1

==== 98 kg ====
26 September

1/8 finals
Henri Burns (TAH) | 0
Yuta Nara (JPN) | 9
Jaloladdin Jumaniýazow (TKM) | 0
Hardeep Singh (IND) | 8

Quarterfinals
Mirzoamin Safarov (TJK) | 4
Uzur Dzhuzupbekov (KGZ) | 15
Meng Lingzhe (CHN) | 6^{F}
Yerulan Iskakov (KAZ) | 1
Amir Hossein Hosseini (IRI) | 8
Aslan Kuliýew (TKM) | 1
Yuta Nara (JPN) | 2
Hardeep Singh (IND) | 2

Semifinals
Uzur Dzhuzupbekov (KGZ) | WO
Meng Lingzhe (CHN)
Amir Hossein Hosseini (IRI) | 1
Yuta Nara (JPN) | 1

Final
Uzur Dzhuzupbekov (KGZ) | 2
Amir Hossein Hosseini (IRI) | 3

Repechage bronze
Mirzoamin Safarov (TJK) | WO
Meng Lingzhe (CHN)
Aslan Kuliýew (TKM) | 1
Yuta Nara (JPN) | 4

==== 130 kg ====
26 September

1/8 finals
Satoshi Kaizuka (JPN) | 5
Maýyl Bahlulow (TKM) | 2
Nurmakhan Tinaliyev (KAZ) | 2
Behnam Mehdizadeh (IRI) | 3
Mohammad Ramin Rasooli (AFG) | 1
Meng Qiang (CHN) | 3
Süleýman Belliýew (TKM) | 4
Murat Ramonov (KGZ) | 4^{F}
Muhammad Umair (PAK) | 0
Sukhroj Azizov (TJK) | 4
Naveen Sevlia (IND) | 9
Dukay Tairuwepiy (FSM) | 0
Azmuddin Vakhobov (TJK) | 10
Hassan Hamieh (LBN) | 2
Hamzeh Odtalla (JOR) | 0
Muminjon Abdullaev (UZB) | 7

Quarterfinals
Satoshi Kaizuka (JPN) | 3
Behnam Mehdizadeh (IRI) | 7
Meng Qiang (CHN) | 7
Murat Ramonov (KGZ) | 5
Sukhroj Azizov (TJK) | 0
Naveen Sevlia (IND) | 5
Azmuddin Vakhobov (TJK) | 1
Muminjon Abdullaev (UZB) | 10

Semifinals
Behnam Mehdizadeh (IRI) | 1
Meng Qiang (CHN) | 0
Naveen Sevlia (IND) | 2^{F}
Muminjon Abdullaev (UZB) | 2

Final
Behnam Mehdizadeh (IRI) | 2
Naveen Sevlia (IND) | 0

Repechage round 1
Nurmakhan Tinaliyev (KAZ) | 3
Satoshi Kaizuka (JPN) | 1
Dukay Tairuwepiy (FSM) | 0
Sukhroj Azizov (TJK) | 8

Repechage bronze
Nurmakhan Tinaliyev (KAZ) | 2
Meng Qiang (CHN) | 0
Sukhroj Azizov (TJK) | 0
Muminjon Abdullaev (UZB) | 8

=== Women's freestyle ===
==== 48 kg ====
24 September

1/8 finals
Alvina Lim (SGP) | 0
Dauletbike Yakhshimuratova (UZB) | 10
Phạm Thị Hà Phương (VIE) | 6
Chang Yu-syuan (TPE) | 0
Asha Niroshani Karunasena (SRI) | 0
Shintia Eka Arfenda (INA) | 6^{F}
Saiana Baiyzova (KGZ) | 11
Jamilýa Annamuradowa (TKM) | 0
Sheetal Tomar (IND) | 11
Rupinder Kaur Sandhu (AUS) | 0
Grace Loberanes (PHI) | 0^{R}
Sun Yanan (CHN) | 4

Quarterfinals
Irina Borissova (KAZ) | 0
Miho Igarashi (JPN) | 10
Dauletbike Yakhshimuratova (UZB) | 3
Phạm Thị Hà Phương (VIE) | 2
Shintia Eka Arfenda (INA) | 11
Saiana Baiyzova (KGZ) | 10
Sheetal Tomar (IND) | 2
Sun Yanan (CHN) | 8^{F}

Semifinals
Miho Igarashi (JPN) | 12
Dauletbike Yakhshimuratova (UZB) | 0
Shintia Eka Arfenda (INA) | 0
Sun Yanan (CHN) | 10

Final
Miho Igarashi (JPN) | 1
Sun Yanan (CHN) | 2

Repechage round 1
Grace Loberanes (PHI) | 0
Sheetal Tomar (IND) | 2^{F}

Repechage bronze
Irina Borissova (KAZ) | 4
Dauletbike Yakhshimuratova (UZB) | 6
Sheetal Tomar (IND) | 10^{F}
Shintia Eka Arfenda (INA) | 0

==== 53 kg ====
25 September

1/8 finals
Shamika Madushani (SRI) | 0
Vũ Thị Hằng (VIE) | 2^{F}
Bahar Hekimowa (TKM) | 0
Mia-Lahnee Aquino (GUM) | 2^{F}
Yuka Yago (JPN) | 10
Nazira Marsbek Kyzy (KGZ) | 0

Quarterfinals
Sevara Eshmuratova (UZB) | 12^{F}
Mardiatul Anggraini (INA) | 0
Ýulduz Madýarowa (TKM) | 0
Zhuldyz Eshimova (KAZ) | 5^{F}
Luo Lannuan (CHN) | 11^{F}
Vũ Thị Hằng (VIE) | 2
Mia-Lahnee Aquino (GUM) | 1
Yuka Yago (JPN) | 12

Semifinals
Sevara Eshmuratova (UZB) | 0
Zhuldyz Eshimova (KAZ) | 2
Luo Lannuan (CHN) | 0
Yuka Yago (JPN) | 4

Final
Zhuldyz Eshimova (KAZ) | 0
Yuka Yago (JPN) | 10

Repechage round 1
Nazira Marsbek Kyzy (KGZ) | 12
Mia-Lahnee Aquino (GUM) | 2

Repechage bronze
Ýulduz Madýarowa (TKM) | 0
Sevara Eshmuratova (UZB) | 2^{F}
Nazira Marsbek Kyzy (KGZ) | 0
Luo Lannuan (CHN) | 10

==== 58 kg ====
25 September

1/8 finals
Ariadne Burkhart (AUS) | 4
Rckaela Aquino (GUM) | 8^{F}
Merjen Rahiýewa (TKM) | 0
Pei Xingru (CHN) | 8^{F}
Pooja Dhanda (IND) | 4^{F}
Noemi Tener (PHI) | 0
Marina Sedneva (KAZ) | 2^{F}
Deepika Dilhani (SRI) | 0

Quarterfinals
Asem Seydametova (UZB) | 8
Đào Thị Hương (VIE) | 11
Akie Hanai (JPN) | 4
Aisuluu Tynybekova (KGZ) | 4
Rckaela Aquino (GUM) | 0
Pei Xingru (CHN) | 4^{F}
Pooja Dhanda (IND) | 10
Marina Sedneva (KAZ) | 0

Semifinals
Đào Thị Hương (VIE) | 0
Aisuluu Tynybekova (KGZ) | 4^{F}
Pei Xingru (CHN) | 5
Pooja Dhanda (IND) | 2

Final
Aisuluu Tynybekova (KGZ) | 1
Pei Xingru (CHN) | 4

Repechage round 1
Merjen Rahiýewa (TKM) | 0
Rckaela Aquino (GUM) | 6^{F}

Repechage bronze
Akie Hanai (JPN) | 6^{F}
Đào Thị Hương (VIE) | 0
Rckaela Aquino (GUM) | 0
Pooja Dhanda (IND) | 4^{F}

==== 63 kg ====
25 September

1/8 finals
Shilpi Sheoran (IND) | 4
Dewi Atiya (INA) | 8

Quarterfinals
Xu Rui (CHN) | 12
Ilania Keju (MHL) | 2
Oguljan Egemberdiýewa (TKM) | 0
Yurika Ito (JPN) | 10
Nurjahan Altyýewa (TKM) | 0
Nguyễn Thị Vinh (VIE) | 6^{F}
Ayaulym Kassymova (KAZ) | 4^{F}
Dewi Atiya (INA) | 0

Semifinals
Xu Rui (CHN) | 8
Yurika Ito (JPN) | 1
Nguyễn Thị Vinh (VIE) | 2
Ayaulym Kassymova (KAZ) | 11^{F}

Final
Xu Rui (CHN) | 10
Ayaulym Kassymova (KAZ) | 8

Repechage bronze
Ilania Keju (MHL) | 0
Yurika Ito (JPN) | 10
Dewi Atiya (INA) | 5
Nguyễn Thị Vinh (VIE) | 8

==== 69 kg ====
24 September

1/8 finals
Sherin Sultana (BAN) | 0
Mamajan Şaýyýewa (TKM) | 5^{F}
Desi Sinta (INA) | 0
Navjot Kaur (IND) | 12

Quarterfinals
Meerim Zhumanazarova (KGZ) | 6
Elmira Syzdykova (KAZ) | 8
Naruha Matsuyuki (JPN) | 15
Chen Wen-ling (TPE) | 4
Zhou Feng (CHN) | 4^{F}
Solmaz Bozaganowa (TKM) | 0
Mamajan Şaýyýewa (TKM) | 0
Navjot Kaur (IND) | 10

Semifinals
Elmira Syzdykova (KAZ) | 3
Naruha Matsuyuki (JPN) | 0
Zhou Feng (CHN) | 11
Navjot Kaur (IND) | 0

Final
Elmira Syzdykova (KAZ) | 0
Zhou Feng (CHN) | 9

Repechage bronze
Meerim Zhumanazarova (KGZ) | 2
Naruha Matsuyuki (JPN) | 1
Solmaz Bozaganowa (TKM) | 0
Navjot Kaur (IND) | 8^{F}

==== 75 kg ====
25 September

1/8 finals
Pooja Gehlot (IND) | 2
Aiperi Medet Kyzy (KGZ) | 2

Quarterfinals
Paliha (CHN) | 6^{F}
Beatrice Mata (GUM) | 0
Chang Hui-tsz (TPE) | 2
Natsumi Baba (JPN) | 8
Rozanna Kurambaýewa (TKM) | 0
Gulmaral Yerkebayeva (KAZ) | 6^{F}
Gunça Seýitmyradowa (TKM) | 0
Aiperi Medet Kyzy (KGZ) | 10

Semifinals
Paliha (CHN) | 10
Natsumi Baba (JPN) | 0
Gulmaral Yerkebayeva (KAZ) | 2
Aiperi Medet Kyzy (KGZ) | 0

Final
Paliha (CHN) | 4
Gulmaral Yerkebayeva (KAZ) | 1

Repechage bronze
Beatrice Mata (GUM) | 0
Natsumi Baba (JPN) | 10
Rozanna Kurambaýewa (TKM) | 0
Aiperi Medet Kyzy (KGZ) | 10
