= Japan at the 2017 Asian Indoor and Martial Arts Games =

- IOC code: JPN
- NOC: Japanese Olympic Committee
- Website: www.joc.or.jp

in Ashgabat, Turkmenistan September 17 - September 27
- Competitors: 60 in 6 sports
- Medals Ranked 20th: Gold 2 Silver 5 Bronze 10 Total 17

Asian Indoor and Martial Arts Games appearances
- 2005; 2007; 2009; 2013; 2017; 2021; 2025

Japan competed at the 2017 Asian Indoor and Martial Arts Games held in Ashgabat, Turkmenistan from September 17 to 27. Japan sent a delegation consisting of 60 competitors for the event. Japan won a total of 17 medals in the event including 2 gold medals.

== Participants ==
Sport	Men	Women	Total
Futsal	14	14	28
Wrestling	12	6	18
Dancesport	4	4	8
Belt wrestling	3	0	3
Kurash	2	0	2
Weightlifting	0	1	1

== Medal summary ==
=== Medal table ===
Sport	Gold	Silver	Bronze	Total
Wrestling	1	2	6	9
Dancesport	1	2	1	4
Futsal	0	1	1	2
Kurash	0	0	1	1
Weightlifting	0	0	1	1
Totals (5 entries)	2	5	10	17

=== Medalists ===
Medal	Name	Sport	Event	Date
Gold	Takeshi Yamamoto; Tomomi Yamamoto	Dancesport	Vienniese waltz	September 25
Gold	Yuka Yago	Wrestling	Women's freestyle - 53 kg	September 25
Silver	Daichi Takatani	Wrestling	Men's freestyle - 65 kg	September 24
Silver	Miho Igarashi	Wrestling	Women's freestyle - 48 kg	September 24
Silver	Minato Kojima; Megumi Morita	Dancesport	Quick step	September 25
Silver	Takeshi Yamamoto; Tomomi Yamamoto	Dancesport	Slow Foxtrot	September 25
Silver	Ringo Maehara; Masami Kato; Eriko Hotta; Mio Fujita; Ryo Egawa; Chihiro Tanaka; Junko Takemura; Miku Sakurada; Minako Sekinada; Shiori Nakajima; Kana Kitagawa; Ayaka Yamamoto; Akari Takao; Mutsumi Sakata	Futsal	Women's futsal	September 25
Bronze	Motonori Shimada	Kurash	Men's 73 kg	September 21
Bronze	Kamiya Ayumi	Weightlifting	Women's 75 kg	September 23
Bronze	Kazuya Koyanagi	Wrestling	Men's freestyle - 57 kg	September 24
Bronze	Akie Hanai	Wrestling	Women's freestyle - 58 kg	September 25
Bronze	Yurika Ito	Wrestling	Women's freestyle - 63 kg	September 25
Bronze	Natsumi Baba	Wrestling	Women's freestyle - 75 kg	September 25
Bronze	Yamato Ui	Wrestling	Men's Greco-Roman - 66 kg	September 26
Bronze	Yuta Nara	Wrestling	Men's Greco-Roman - 98 kg	September 26
Bronze	Sota Fujii; Ami Yoshikawa	Dancesport	Cha-Cha-Cha	September 26
Bronze	Taku Miura; Daimu Yazawa; Shinsuke Hara; Kasho Tamura; Shota Horigome; Koto Uematsu; Kiyoto Yagi; Koichi Saito; Takashi Morimura; Yuki Murota; Kazuya Shimizu; Takuya Uehara; Masaya Hashimoto; Atsuya Uemura	Futsal	Men's futsal	September 26
