= Wrestling at the 2015 Military World Games =

- Dates: 6–10 October 2015

Wrestling at the 2015 Military World Games was held in Mungyeong, South Korea from 6 to 10 October 2015.

== Medal summary ==
=== Men's freestyle ===
Event	Gold	Silver	Bronze
57 kg	Kim Jin-cheol; South Korea	Vladimir Kudrin; Kazakhstan	Reza Atri; Iran
57 kg	Kim Jin-cheol; South Korea	Vladimir Kudrin; Kazakhstan	Mangal Kadyan; India
61 kg	Dzhamal Otarsultanov; Russia	Mehran Nassiri; Iran	Yeldos Abikenov; Kazakhstan
61 kg	Dzhamal Otarsultanov; Russia	Mehran Nassiri; Iran	Tian Zhenguang; China
65 kg	Magomed Kurbanaliev; Russia	Meisam Heidari; Iran	Aghahuseyn Mustafayev; Azerbaijan
65 kg	Magomed Kurbanaliev; Russia	Meisam Heidari; Iran	Azamat Shagapuly; Kazakhstan
70 kg	Soslan Ramonov; Russia	Joshgun Azimov; Azerbaijan	Ganzorigiin Mandakhnaran; Mongolia
70 kg	Soslan Ramonov; Russia	Joshgun Azimov; Azerbaijan	Mohammad Naderi; Iran
74 kg	Khetag Tsabolov; Russia	Georg Harth; Germany	Galymzhan Usserbayev; Kazakhstan
74 kg	Khetag Tsabolov; Russia	Georg Harth; Germany	Ezzatollah Akbari; Iran
86 kg	Shamil Kudiyamagomedov; Russia	Mohammad Javad Ebrahimi; Iran	Adilet Davlumbayev; Kazakhstan
86 kg	Shamil Kudiyamagomedov; Russia	Mohammad Javad Ebrahimi; Iran	Orgodolyn Üitümen; Mongolia
97 kg	Khadzhimurat Gatsalov; Russia	Dorjkhandyn Khüderbulga; Mongolia	Ivan Yankouski; Belarus
97 kg	Khadzhimurat Gatsalov; Russia	Dorjkhandyn Khüderbulga; Mongolia	Pavlo Oliynyk; Ukraine
125 kg	Vladislav Baitsaev; Russia	Deng Zhiwei; China	Johannes Kessel; Germany
125 kg	Vladislav Baitsaev; Russia	Deng Zhiwei; China	Jafar Shams; Iran

=== Men's Greco-Roman ===
Event	Gold	Silver	Bronze
59 kg	Meirambek Ainagulov; Kazakhstan	Haithem Mahmoud; Egypt	Choi Hyeong-muk; South Korea
59 kg	Meirambek Ainagulov; Kazakhstan	Haithem Mahmoud; Egypt	Mohsen Hajipour; Iran
66 kg	Kim Ji-hun; South Korea	Karen Aslanyan; Armenia	Denys Demyankov; Ukraine
66 kg	Kim Ji-hun; South Korea	Karen Aslanyan; Armenia	Omid Norouzi; Iran
71 kg	Mohammad Ali Geraei; Iran	Lee Jeong-geun; South Korea	Ibrahim El-Desouky; Egypt
71 kg	Mohammad Ali Geraei; Iran	Lee Jeong-geun; South Korea	Mykola Savchenko; Ukraine
75 kg	Kim Jin-hyeok; South Korea	Justin Lester; United States	Ibrahim Ghanem; Egypt
75 kg	Kim Jin-hyeok; South Korea	Justin Lester; United States	Dmytro Pyshkov; Ukraine
80 kg	Rafig Huseynov; Azerbaijan	Evgeny Saleev; Russia	Oleksandr Shyshman; Ukraine
80 kg	Rafig Huseynov; Azerbaijan	Evgeny Saleev; Russia	Sargis Kocharyan; Armenia
85 kg	Zhan Beleniuk; Ukraine	Damian Janikowski; Poland	Laimutis Adomaitis; Lithuania
85 kg	Zhan Beleniuk; Ukraine	Damian Janikowski; Poland	Aleksey Mishin; Russia
98 kg	Nikita Melnikov; Russia	Vilius Laurinaitis; Lithuania	Mostafa Salehizadeh; Iran
98 kg	Nikita Melnikov; Russia	Vilius Laurinaitis; Lithuania	Siarhei Staradub; Belarus
130 kg	Heiki Nabi; Estonia	Oleksandr Chernetskyi; Ukraine	Łukasz Banak; Poland
130 kg	Heiki Nabi; Estonia	Oleksandr Chernetskyi; Ukraine	Bashir Babajanzadeh; Iran

== Medal table ==
Rank	Nation	Gold	Silver	Bronze	Total
1	Russia	8	1	1	10
2	South Korea	3	1	1	5
3	Iran	1	3	8	12
4	Ukraine	1	1	5	7
5	Kazakhstan	1	1	4	6
6	Azerbaijan	1	1	1	3
7	Estonia	1	0	0	1
8	Egypt	0	1	2	3
8	Mongolia	0	1	2	3
10	Armenia	0	1	1	2
10	China	0	1	1	2
10	Germany	0	1	1	2
10	Lithuania	0	1	1	2
10	Poland	0	1	1	2
15	United States	0	1	0	1
16	Belarus	0	0	2	2
17	India	0	0	1	1
Totals (17 entries)		16	16	32	64
