= American Samoa at the 2017 Asian Indoor and Martial Arts Games =

- IOC code: ASA
- NOC: American Samoa National Olympic Committee

in Ashgabat 17–27 September
- Competitors: 7 in 2 sports
- Medals: Gold 0 Silver 0 Bronze 0 Total 0

Asian Indoor and Martial Arts Games appearances
- 2017; 2021; 2025

American Samoa competed at the 2017 Asian Indoor and Martial Arts Games held in Ashgabat, Turkmenistan from September 17 to 27. 7 athletes represented American Samoa in 2 different sports during the event.

American Samoa made its debut in an Asian Indoor and Martial Arts Games event along with other Oceania nations.

== Participants ==
Sport	Men	Women	Total
Indoor Athletics	1	0	1
Wrestling	6	0	6
