= Adilet Davlumbayev =

Kazakhstani freestyle wrestler

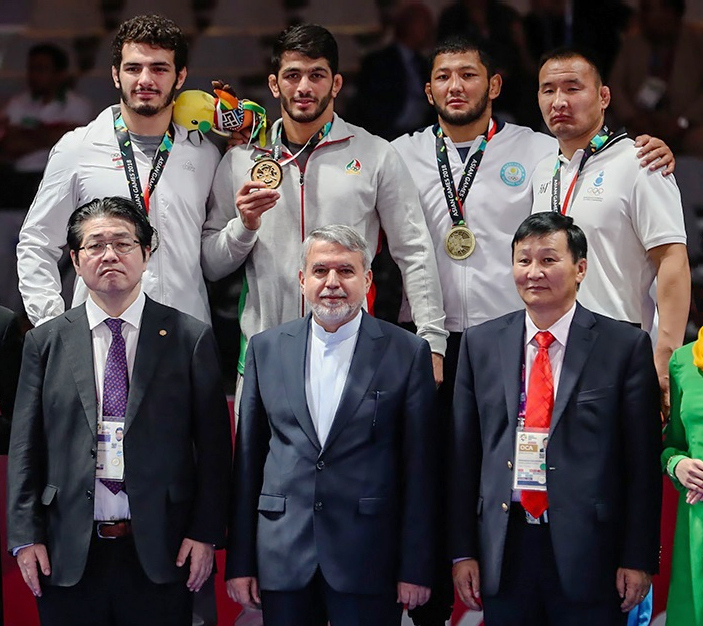
- Davlumbayev in 2018 (top row, second from right)

Personal information
- Born: 6 February 1988 (age 38)

Sport
- Country: Kazakhstan
- Sport: Amateur wrestling
- Event: Freestyle
Medal record
Men's freestyle wrestling
Representing Kazakhstan
Asian Games
Bronze medal – third place	2018 Jakarta	86 kg
Asian Championships
Silver medal – second place	2018 Bishkek	92 kg
Bronze medal – third place	2022 Ulaanbaatar	92 kg
Islamic Solidarity Games
Bronze medal – third place	2017 Baku	86 kg
Asian Indoor and Martial Arts Games
Bronze medal – third place	2017 Ashgabat	86 kg
Military World Games
Bronze medal – third place	2015 Mungyeong	86 kg
Bolat Turlykhanov Cup
Silver medal – second place	2022 Almaty	92 kg

Adilet Davlumbayev (born 6 February 1988) is a Kazakhstani freestyle wrestler. He won one of the bronze medals in the 86 kg event at the 2018 Asian Games held in Jakarta, Indonesia.

== Career ==
In September 2015, Davlumbayev competed in the men's freestyle 86 kg event at the World Wrestling Championships without winning a medal. The following month, he represented Kazakhstan at the 2015 Military World Games in Mungyeong, South Korea where he won one of the bronze medals in the 86 kg event. In 2016, he won one of the bronze medals in the men's 86 kg event at the World University Wrestling Championships held in Çorum, Turkey.

In 2017, Davlumbayev won one of the bronze medals in the 86 kg event at the Asian Indoor and Martial Arts Games held in Ashgabat, Turkmenistan. In his bronze medal match he defeated Muhammad Inam of Pakistan.

In 2018, Davlumbayev won the silver medal in the 86 kg event at the Asian Wrestling Championships held in Bishkek, Kyrgyzstan. In the final, he lost against Mohammad Javad Ebrahimi of Iran.

In 2019, Davlumbayev competed in the men's freestyle 86 kg event at the World Wrestling Championships held in Nur-Sultan, Kazakhstan. He lost his first match against Deepak Punia of India and he was then eliminated in his second repechage match.

Davlumbayev competed in the 92 kg event at the 2022 World Wrestling Championships held in Belgrade, Serbia. He won his first match and he was then eliminated in his next match by eventual bronze medalist Miriani Maisuradze of Georgia.

== Achievements ==
Year	Tournament	Location	Result	Event
2015	Military World Games	Mungyeong, South Korea	3rd	Freestyle 86 kg
2017	Islamic Solidarity Games	Baku, Azerbaijan	3rd	Freestyle 86 kg
2017	Asian Indoor and Martial Arts Games	Ashgabat, Turkmenistan	3rd	Freestyle 86 kg
2018	Asian Championships	Bishkek, Kyrgyzstan	2nd	Freestyle 92 kg
2018	Asian Games	Jakarta, Indonesia	3rd	Freestyle 86 kg
2022	Asian Championships	Ulaanbaatar, Mongolia	3rd	Freestyle 92 kg
