= Ilyas Bekbulatov =

Russian freestyle wrestler

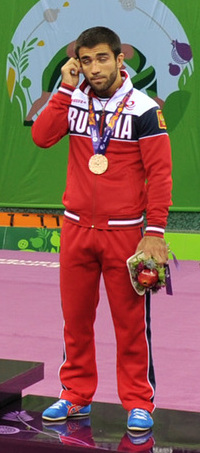
- Bekbulatov at the 2015 European Games

Personal information
- Native name: Ильяс Бекбулатов; Ильяс Идрисович Бекбулатов
- Full name: Ilyas Idrisovich Bekbulatov
- National team: Russia; Uzbekistan
- Born: 12 August 1990 (age 35) Kayakent, Kayakentsky District, Dagestan ASSR, Soviet Union
- Height: 172 cm (5 ft 8 in)

Sport
- Country: Russia (until 2019); Uzbekistan (since 2020)
- Sport: Wrestling
- Weight class: 65 kg 70 kg 74 kg (currently)
- Rank: International master of sport
- Event: Freestyle
- Club: Kayakent WC
- Coached by: Magomed Magomedov; Arsen Gitinov

Achievements and titles
- National finals: (gold) (2015)
Medal record
Representing Uzbekistan
Asian Championships
Gold medal – first place	2022 New Delhi	70 kg
Representing Russia
European Games
Bronze medal – third place	2015 Baku	65 kg
European Wrestling Championships
Bronze medal – third place	2013 Tbilisi	66 kg
Gold medal – first place	2017 Novi Sad	65 kg
Silver medal – second place	2018 Kaspiysk	65 kg
World Cup
Silver medal – second place	2016 Los Angeles	Team
Representing Dagestan
Russian Championships
Gold medal – first place	2015 Kaspiysk	65 kg
Golden Grand Prix Ivan Yarygin
Gold medal – first place	2013 Krasnoyarsk	66 kg
Gold medal – first place	2015 Krasnoyarsk	65 kg
Gold medal – first place	2017 Krasnoyarsk	65 kg
Gold medal – first place	2017 Krasnoyarsk	65 kg

Ilyas Idrisovich Bekbulatov (Russian: Ильяс Идрисович Бекбулатов, Kumyk: Бекболатланы Ильяс Идрисны уланы, romanized: Bekbolatlanı İlyas İdrisnı ulanı; born 12 August 1990) is a Russian-born Uzbekistani freestyle wrestler, who claimed the European title at the 2017 European Wrestling Championships. He wrestles at the 74 kg category on the international circuit. In 2015, he won the gold medal at the senior Russian national championships.

== Career ==
As a junior wrestler, he came in first at the 2008 Russian national championships, 2008 junior European championships and 2007 cadet and junior European championships

In 2013, he won his first senior international title at the 2013 Golden Grand Prix Ivan held in Krasnoyarsk, Russia and bronze medal at 2013 European Championships in Tbilisi, Georgia. In 2015, he won Golden Grand Prix Ivan again, in the final match he over Brent Metcalf of the USA and became the first wrestler who beat Metcalf in freestyle wrestling match, then he won national title at the 2015 Russian National Championships. At the 2015 European Games he lost to Olympic champion Toghrul Asgarov of Azerbaijan, but went on to wrestle back and win a bronze medal against Azamat Nurykau of Belarus. In 2016, he won the silver medal at the World Cup in Los Angeles, California as a Russian team member. Since 2020 he has been representing Uzbekistan in wrestling competition. In February 2020, he earned for Uzbekistan the gold medal at the Asian Championships

== Championships and accomplishments ==
- 2012 Ali Aliev memorial — 1st.
- 2013 Golden Grand Prix Azerbaijan — 3rd.
- 2015 Russian Championships — 1st.
- 2015 European Games — 3rd.
- 2016 World cup — 2nd.
- 2017 European Championships — 1st
- 2020 Asian Championships — 1st
