= Wrestling at the 2018 Asian Games – Men's freestyle 86 kg =

Men's freestyle 86 kg at the 2018 Asian Games
- Venue: Jakarta Convention Center
- Date: 19 August 2018
- Competitors: 19 from 19 nations

Medalists
gold medal	Hassan Yazdani	Iran
silver medal	Domenic Abounader	Lebanon
bronze medal	Adilet Davlumbayev	Kazakhstan
bronze medal	Orgodolyn Üitümen	Mongolia

The men's freestyle 86 kilograms wrestling competition at the 2018 Asian Games in Jakarta was held on 19 August 2018 at the Jakarta Convention Center Assembly Hall.

== Schedule ==
All times are Western Indonesia Time (UTC+07:00)

Date	Time	Event
Sunday, 19 August 2018	13:00	Qualifications
Sunday, 19 August 2018	13:00	1/8 finals
Sunday, 19 August 2018	13:00	Quarterfinals
Sunday, 19 August 2018	13:00	Semifinals
Sunday, 19 August 2018	13:00	Repechages
Sunday, 19 August 2018	20:00	Finals

== Results ==
Legend

- F — Won by fall

=== Main bracket ===
==== Final ====
Final
Domenic Abounader (LBN)	0
Hassan Yazdani (IRI)	10

==== Top half ====
Qualifications

1/8 finals
Domenic Abounader (LBN)	4^{F}
Chiranuwat Chamnanjan (THA)	0
Kim Gwan-uk (KOR)	0
Aligadzhi Gamidgadzhiev (KGZ)	10
Sarot Chandra Ray (BAN)	0
Abdul Haia Faqiri (AFG)	11
Bakhodur Kadirov (TJK)	0
Adilet Davlumbayev (KAZ)	8

Quarterfinals
Domenic Abounader (LBN)	8
Aligadzhi Gamidgadzhiev (KGZ)	7
Abdul Haia Faqiri (AFG)	0
Adilet Davlumbayev (KAZ)	3^{F}

Semifinals
Domenic Abounader (LBN)	10
Adilet Davlumbayev (KAZ)	9

==== Bottom half ====
Qualifications
Bi Shengfeng (CHN)	6
Orgodolyn Üitümen (MGL)	3^{F}
Rashid Kurbanov (UZB)	10
Wael Al-Haj (PLE)	0
Shota Shirai (JPN)	2^{F}
Fedaeddin Al-Osta (SYR)	0

1/8 finals
Fahriansyah (INA)	0
Hassan Yazdani (IRI)	10
Heng Vuthy (CAM)	0
Pawan Kumar (IND)	8^{F}
Azat Gajyýew (TKM)	0
Orgodolyn Üitümen (MGL)	10
Rashid Kurbanov (UZB)	4
Shota Shirai (JPN)	0

Quarterfinals
Hassan Yazdani (IRI)	11
Pawan Kumar (IND)	0
Orgodolyn Üitümen (MGL)	6
Rashid Kurbanov (UZB)	2

Semifinals
Hassan Yazdani (IRI)	12
Orgodolyn Üitümen (MGL)	2

=== Repechage ===
Repechage round 2
Chiranuwat Chamnanjan (THA)	0
Aligadzhi Gamidgadzhiev (KGZ)	2^{F}
Fahriansyah (INA)	0
Pawan Kumar (IND)	11

Bronze medals
Aligadzhi Gamidgadzhiev (KGZ)	0
Adilet Davlumbayev (KAZ)	3
Pawan Kumar (IND)	1
Orgodolyn Üitümen (MGL)	8

== Final standing ==
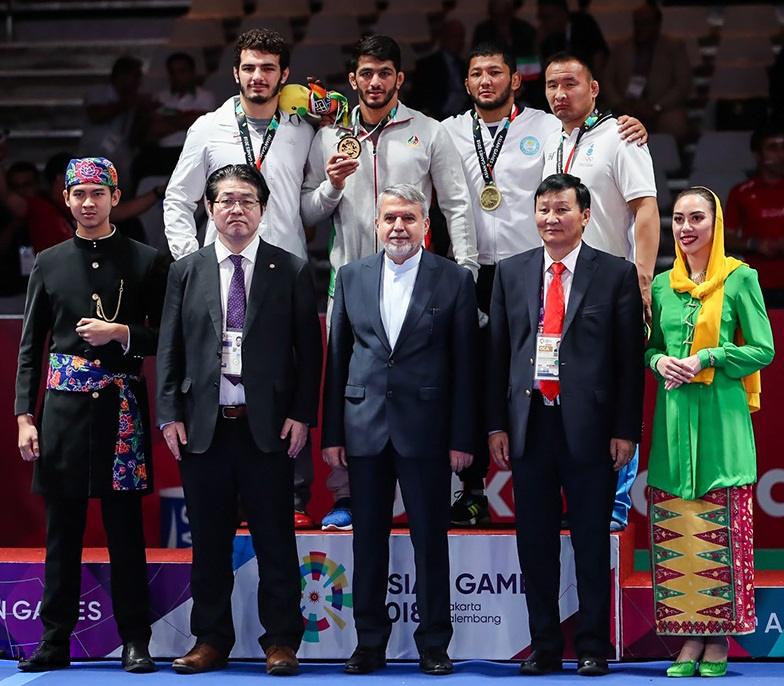
Podium, Left-right: Abounader, Yazdani, Davlumbayev, Üitümen

Rank	Athlete
1st place, gold medalist(s)	Hassan Yazdani (IRI)
2nd place, silver medalist(s)	Domenic Abounader (LBN)
3rd place, bronze medalist(s)	Adilet Davlumbayev (KAZ)
3rd place, bronze medalist(s)	Orgodolyn Üitümen (MGL)
5	Aligadzhi Gamidgadzhiev (KGZ)
5	Pawan Kumar (IND)
7	Rashid Kurbanov (UZB)
8	Shota Shirai (JPN)
9	Abdul Haia Faqiri (AFG)
10	Bi Shengfeng (CHN)
11	Fedaaldin Al-Asta (SYR)
12	Chiranuwat Chamnanjan (THA)
13	Heng Vuthy (CAM)
13	Bakhodur Kadirov (TJK)
15	Wael Al-Haj (PLE)
15	Azat Gajyýew (TKM)
15	Kim Gwan-uk (KOR)
18	Sarot Chandra Ray (BAN)
19	Fahriansyah (INA)
