= Bodia =

- Village
- Location in Haryana, India Bodia (India)
- Country: India
- State: Haryana
- Region: North India
- District: Jhajjar

Languages
  - Official: Hindi
- Time zone: UTC+5:30 (IST)
- PIN: 124507
- ISO 3166 code: IN-HR
- Vehicle registration: HR-14
- Website: haryana.gov.in

Bodia is a village located in Jhajjar district, Haryana, India. It is also called Boria. Olympic wrestler Ravinder Khatri hails from this village.
