= 2020 Asian Wrestling Championships =

- Host city: New Delhi, India
- Dates: 18–23 February 2020
- Stadium: K. D. Jadhav Indoor Stadium

Champions
- Freestyle: Iran
- Greco-Roman: Iran
- Women: Japan

The 2020 Asian Wrestling Championships was held at the KD Jadhav Indoor Stadium, Indira Gandhi Arena, New Delhi in India. The event took place from 18 to 23 February. China was barred from entering into the competition due to the COVID-19 pandemic. North Korea and Turkmenistan were unable to participate in the tournament due to circumstances stemming from the outbreak.

== Medal table ==
Rank	Nation	Gold	Silver	Bronze	Total
1	Japan	8	4	4	16
2	Iran	7	3	7	17
3	India	5	6	9	20
4	Kazakhstan	5	2	12	19
5	Kyrgyzstan	2	3	6	11
6	Uzbekistan	2	2	6	10
7	South Korea	1	4	1	6
8	Mongolia	0	4	4	8
9	Tajikistan	0	2	2	4
10	Iraq	0	0	1	1
Totals (10 entries)		30	30	52	112

== Team ranking ==
Rank	Men's freestyle		Men's Greco-Roman		Women's freestyle	
Rank	Team	Points	Team	Points	Team	Points
1	Iran	168	Iran	190	Japan	209
2	India	159	Uzbekistan	146	India	180
3	Kazakhstan	146	Kazakhstan	136	Kazakhstan	164
4	Japan	140	South Korea	130	Mongolia	143
5	Kyrgyzstan	114	India	127	Uzbekistan	110
6	Uzbekistan	94	Kyrgyzstan	119	Kyrgyzstan	51
7	Mongolia	93	Japan	98	South Korea	51
8	Tajikistan	85	Tajikistan	37	Vietnam	49
9	South Korea	57	Iraq	33	Thailand	16
10	Iraq	24	Thailand	28	Chinese Taipei	16

== Medal summary ==
=== Men's freestyle ===
Event	Gold	Silver	Bronze
57 kg	Ravi Kumar Dahiya; India	Hikmatullo Vohidov; Tajikistan	Bekbolot Myrzanazar Uulu; Kyrgyzstan
57 kg	Ravi Kumar Dahiya; India	Hikmatullo Vohidov; Tajikistan	Yuki Takahashi; Japan
61 kg	Ulukbek Zholdoshbekov; Kyrgyzstan	Muhamad Ikromov; Tajikistan	Ryuto Sakaki; Japan
61 kg	Ulukbek Zholdoshbekov; Kyrgyzstan	Muhamad Ikromov; Tajikistan	Rahul Aware; India
65 kg	Takuto Otoguro; Japan	Bajrang Punia; India	Daulet Niyazbekov; Kazakhstan
65 kg	Takuto Otoguro; Japan	Bajrang Punia; India	Amir Hossein Maghsoudi; Iran
70 kg	Ilyas Bekbulatov; Uzbekistan	Amir Hossein Hosseini; Iran	Meirzhan Ashirov; Kazakhstan
70 kg	Ilyas Bekbulatov; Uzbekistan	Amir Hossein Hosseini; Iran	Islambek Orozbekov; Kyrgyzstan
74 kg	Daniyar Kaisanov; Kazakhstan	Jitender Kumar; India	Daichi Takatani; Japan
74 kg	Daniyar Kaisanov; Kazakhstan	Jitender Kumar; India	Mostafa Hosseinkhani; Iran
79 kg	Arsalan Budazhapov; Kyrgyzstan	Gourav Baliyan; India	Shinkichi Okui; Japan
79 kg	Arsalan Budazhapov; Kyrgyzstan	Gourav Baliyan; India	Ali Savadkouhi; Iran
86 kg	Shutaro Yamada; Japan	Ahmad Bazri; Iran	Isa Shapiev; Uzbekistan
86 kg	Shutaro Yamada; Japan	Ahmad Bazri; Iran	Deepak Punia; India
92 kg	Mohammad Javad Ebrahimi; Iran	Takuma Otsu; Japan	Mönkhbaataryn Tsogtgerel; Mongolia
92 kg	Mohammad Javad Ebrahimi; Iran	Takuma Otsu; Japan	Iliskhan Chilayev; Kazakhstan
97 kg	Mojtaba Goleij; Iran	Satyawart Kadian; India	Rustam Iskandari; Tajikistan
97 kg	Mojtaba Goleij; Iran	Satyawart Kadian; India	Alisher Yergali; Kazakhstan
125 kg	Yusup Batirmurzaev; Kazakhstan	Dorjkhandyn Khüderbulga; Mongolia	Nam Kyung-jin; South Korea
125 kg	Yusup Batirmurzaev; Kazakhstan	Dorjkhandyn Khüderbulga; Mongolia	Parviz Hadi; Iran

=== Men's Greco-Roman ===
Event	Gold	Silver	Bronze
55 kg	Pouya Nasserpour; Iran	Jasurbek Ortikboev; Uzbekistan	Arjun Halakurki; India
55 kg	Pouya Nasserpour; Iran	Jasurbek Ortikboev; Uzbekistan	Khorlan Zhakansha; Kazakhstan
60 kg	Kenichiro Fumita; Japan	Zholaman Sharshenbekov; Kyrgyzstan	Islomjon Bakhromov; Uzbekistan
60 kg	Kenichiro Fumita; Japan	Zholaman Sharshenbekov; Kyrgyzstan	Mehdi Mohsennejad; Iran
63 kg	Elmurat Tasmuradov; Uzbekistan	Song Jin-seub; South Korea	Mubinjon Akhmedov; Tajikistan
63 kg	Elmurat Tasmuradov; Uzbekistan	Song Jin-seub; South Korea	Meisam Dalkhani; Iran
67 kg	Ryu Han-su; South Korea	Makhmud Bakhshilloev; Uzbekistan	Ashu Bazard; India
67 kg	Ryu Han-su; South Korea	Makhmud Bakhshilloev; Uzbekistan	Hossein Asadi; Iran
72 kg	Amin Kavianinejad; Iran	Ibragim Magomadov; Kazakhstan	Ruslan Tsarev; Kyrgyzstan
72 kg	Amin Kavianinejad; Iran	Ibragim Magomadov; Kazakhstan	Aditya Kundu; India
77 kg	Tamerlan Shadukayev; Kazakhstan	Pejman Poshtam; Iran	Hussein Ali; Iraq
77 kg	Tamerlan Shadukayev; Kazakhstan	Pejman Poshtam; Iran	Renat Iliaz Uulu; Kyrgyzstan
82 kg	Mehdi Ebrahimi; Iran	Choi Jun-hyeong; South Korea	Jalgasbay Berdimuratov; Uzbekistan
82 kg	Mehdi Ebrahimi; Iran	Choi Jun-hyeong; South Korea	None awarded
87 kg	Sunil Kumar; India	Azat Salidinov; Kyrgyzstan	Azamat Kustubayev; Kazakhstan
87 kg	Sunil Kumar; India	Azat Salidinov; Kyrgyzstan	None awarded
97 kg	Mohammad Hadi Saravi; Iran	Lee Se-yeol; South Korea	Muhammadali Shamsiddinov; Uzbekistan
97 kg	Mohammad Hadi Saravi; Iran	Lee Se-yeol; South Korea	Hardeep Singh; India
130 kg	Amin Mirzazadeh; Iran	Kim Min-seok; South Korea	Roman Kim; Kyrgyzstan
130 kg	Amin Mirzazadeh; Iran	Kim Min-seok; South Korea	Mansur Shadukayev; Kazakhstan

=== Women's freestyle ===
Event	Gold	Silver	Bronze
50 kg	Miho Igarashi; Japan	Nirmala Devi; India	Valentina Islamova; Kazakhstan
50 kg	Miho Igarashi; Japan	Nirmala Devi; India	Dauletbike Yakhshimuratova; Uzbekistan
53 kg	Tatyana Akhmetova-Amanzhol; Kazakhstan	Mayu Mukaida; Japan	Vinesh Phogat; India
53 kg	Tatyana Akhmetova-Amanzhol; Kazakhstan	Mayu Mukaida; Japan	Aktenge Keunimjaeva; Uzbekistan
55 kg	Pinki; India	Mönkhboldyn Dölgöön; Mongolia	Marina Zuyeva; Kazakhstan
55 kg	Pinki; India	Mönkhboldyn Dölgöön; Mongolia	None awarded
57 kg	Risako Kawai; Japan	Erkhembayaryn Davaachimeg; Mongolia	Anshu Malik; India
57 kg	Risako Kawai; Japan	Erkhembayaryn Davaachimeg; Mongolia	Altynay Satylgan; Kazakhstan
59 kg	Sarita Mor; India	Altantsetsegiin Battsetseg; Mongolia	Madina Bakbergenova; Kazakhstan
59 kg	Sarita Mor; India	Altantsetsegiin Battsetseg; Mongolia	None awarded
62 kg	Yukako Kawai; Japan	Ayaulym Kassymova; Kazakhstan	Pürveegiin Nomin-Erdene; Mongolia
62 kg	Yukako Kawai; Japan	Ayaulym Kassymova; Kazakhstan	Aisuluu Tynybekova; Kyrgyzstan
65 kg	Naomi Ruike; Japan	Sakshi Malik; India	Zorigtyn Bolortungalag; Mongolia
65 kg	Naomi Ruike; Japan	Sakshi Malik; India	None awarded
68 kg	Divya Kakran; India	Naruha Matsuyuki; Japan	Enkhsaikhany Delgermaa; Mongolia
68 kg	Divya Kakran; India	Naruha Matsuyuki; Japan	None awarded
72 kg	Zhamila Bakbergenova; Kazakhstan	Mei Shindo; Japan	Gursharan Preet Kaur; India
72 kg	Zhamila Bakbergenova; Kazakhstan	Mei Shindo; Japan	None awarded
76 kg	Hiroe Minagawa; Japan	Aiperi Medet Kyzy; Kyrgyzstan	Elmira Syzdykova; Kazakhstan
76 kg	Hiroe Minagawa; Japan	Aiperi Medet Kyzy; Kyrgyzstan	None awarded

== Participating nations ==
274 competitors from 23 nations competed.

- Bahrain (2)
- Chinese Taipei (6)
- India (30)
- Iran (20)
- Iraq (11)
- Japan (30)
- Jordan (2)
- Kazakhstan (30)
- Kuwait (2)
- Kyrgyzstan (24)
- Mongolia (21)
- Pakistan (4)
- Palestine (1)
- Philippines (1)
- Qatar (2)
- Saudi Arabia (3)
- South Korea (22)
- Syria (2)
- Tajikistan (15)
- Thailand (9)
- Uzbekistan (30)
- Vietnam (5)
- Yemen (2)
