= Pejman Poshtam =

Iranian Greco-Roman wrestler

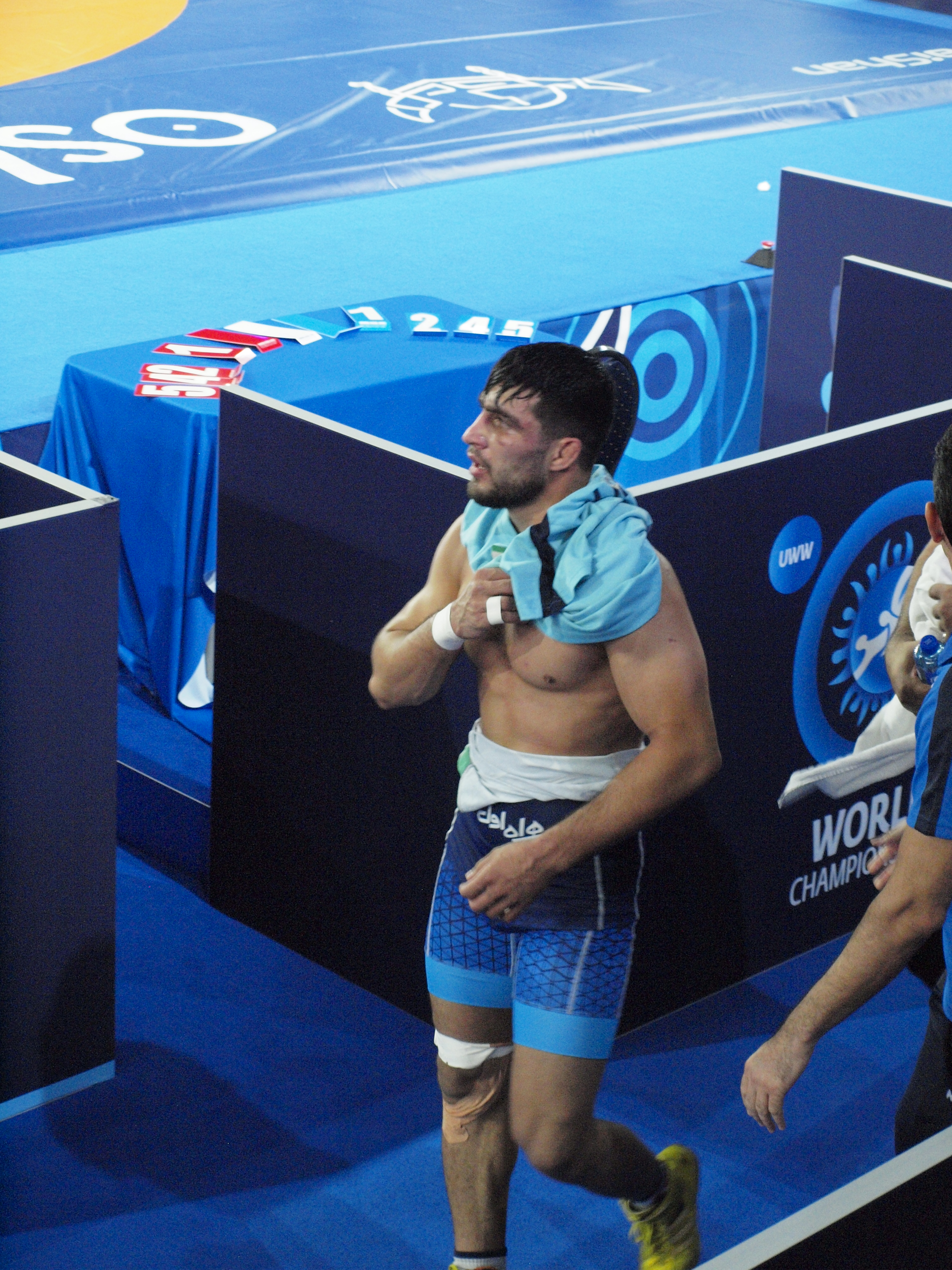
- Pejman Poshtam at the 2021 World Wrestling Championships in Oslo, Norway

Personal information
- Born: 11 January 1994 (age 32) Baqershahr, Ray County
- Height: 178 cm (5 ft 10 in)

Sport
- Country: Iran
- Sport: Amateur wrestling
- Event: Greco-Roman
Medal record
Men's Greco-Roman wrestling
Representing Iran
World Championships
Bronze medal – third place	2021 Oslo	82 kg
Asian Championships
Gold medal – first place	2021 Almaty	77 kg
Silver medal – second place	2020 New Delhi	77 kg
Military World Games
Gold medal – first place	2019 Wuhan	77 kg
Asian Indoor and Martial Arts Games
Gold medal – first place	2017 Ashgabat	75 kg
Vehbi Emre & Hamit Kaplan Tournament
Bronze medal – third place	2023 Istanbul	87 kg

Pejman Poshtam (Persian: پژمان پشتام, born 11 January 1994) is an Iranian Greco-Roman wrestler. He is a bronze medalist at the World Wrestling Championships and a two-time medalist, including gold, at the Asian Wrestling Championships.

== Career ==
At the 2017 Asian Indoor and Martial Arts Games held in Ashgabat, Turkmenistan, he won the gold medal in the 75 kg event. In 2018, he competed in the 77 kg event at the World Wrestling Championships where he was eliminated in his first match by Dmytro Pyshkov of Ukraine.

In 2019, he represented Iran at the Military World Games held in Wuhan, China and he won the gold medal in the 77 kg event. In the final, he defeated Hasan Aliyev of Azerbaijan. In 2020, he won the silver medal in the 77 kg event at the Asian Wrestling Championships held in New Delhi, India.

He competed in the 82 kg event at the 2022 World Wrestling Championships held in Belgrade, Serbia. He was eliminated in his second match by Yaroslav Filchakov of Ukraine.

== Achievements ==
Year	Tournament	Location	Result	Event
2017	Asian Indoor and Martial Arts Games	Ashgabat, Turkmenistan	1st	Greco-Roman 75 kg
2019	Military World Games	Wuhan, China	1st	Greco-Roman 77 kg
2020	Asian Championships	New Delhi, India	2nd	Greco-Roman 77 kg
2021	Asian Championships	Almaty, Kazakhstan	1st	Greco-Roman 77 kg
2021	World Championships	Oslo, Norway	3rd	Greco-Roman 82 kg
