= Tamerlan Shadukayev =

Kazakh Greco-Roman wrestler

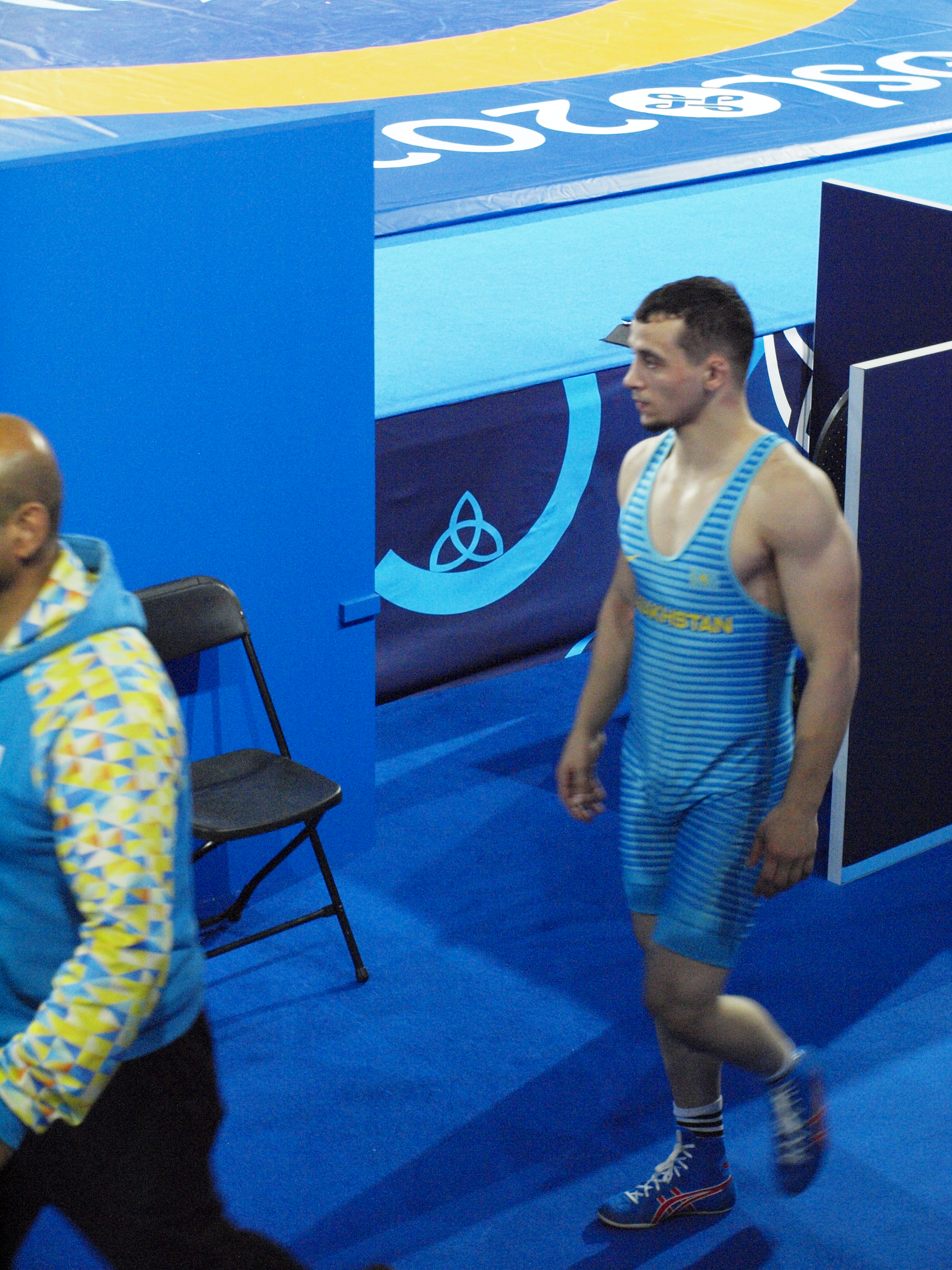
- Shadukayev at the 2021 World Wrestling Championships in Oslo, Norway

Personal information
- Born: 22 January 1996 (age 30)

Sport
- Country: Kazakhstan
- Sport: Amateur wrestling
- Weight class: 77 kg
- Event: Greco-Roman
Medal record
Men's Greco-Roman wrestling
Representing Kazakhstan
Asian Championships
Gold medal – first place	2020 New Delhi	77 kg
Bronze medal – third place	2019 Xi'an	77 kg
Asian Indoor and Martial Arts Games
Bronze medal – third place	2017 Ashgabat	75 kg
Vehbi Emre & Hamit Kaplan Tournament
Bronze medal – third place	2018 Istanbul	77 kg
Bronze medal – third place	2024 Antalya	77 kg
World U23 Championship
Bronze medal – third place	2019 Budapest	77 kg

Tamerlan Shadukayev (born 22 January 1996) is a Kazakh Greco-Roman wrestler. He won the gold medal in the 77 kg event at the 2020 Asian Wrestling Championships held in New Delhi, India.

== Career ==
Shadukayev won one of the bronze medals in the 75 kg event at the 2017 Asian Indoor and Martial Arts Games held in Ashgabat, Turkmenistan.

In 2019, Shadukayev won one of the bronze medals in the 77 kg event at the Asian Wrestling Championships held in Xi'an, China. At the 2019 World U23 Wrestling Championship held in Budapest, Hungary, he also won one of the bronze medals in the 77 kg event.

In 2021, Shadukayev won one of the bronze medals in the 77 kg event at the Matteo Pellicone Ranking Series 2021 held in Rome, Italy.

He competed in the 77 kg event at the 2022 World Wrestling Championships held in Belgrade, Serbia.

== Achievements ==
Year	Tournament	Location	Result	Event
2017	Asian Indoor and Martial Arts Games	Ashgabat, Turkmenistan	3rd	Greco-Roman 75 kg
2019	Asian Championships	Xi'an, China	3rd	Greco-Roman 77 kg
2020	Asian Championships	New Delhi, India	1st	Greco-Roman 77 kg
