= Mohsen Hajipour =

Iranian Greco-Roman wrestler

Personal information
- Full name: Mohsen Hossein Hajipour
- Nationality: Iran
- Born: 29 August 1988 (age 38) Amol, Iran
- Height: 162 cm (5 ft 4 in)
- Weight: 63 kg (139 lb)

Sport
- Country: Iran
- Sport: Amateur wrestling
- Event: Greco-Roman
- Club: Takhti Amol
- Coached by: Bakhtiar Taghavinia; Adel Balitabar
Medal record
Men's Greco-Roman wrestling
Representing Iran
Asian Indoor and Martial Arts Games
Silver medal – second place	2017 Ashgabat	59 kg
Asian Championships
Bronze medal – third place	2011 Tashkent	55 kg
World Military Championships
Gold medal – first place	2008 Split	55 kg
Silver medal – second place	2016 Skopje	59 kg
World University Championships
Gold medal – first place	2010 Torino	55 kg
Military World Games
Bronze medal – third place	2015 Mungyeong	59 kg
Grand Prix
Gold medal – first place	2018 Gyoer	63 kg
Gold medal – first place	2017 Paris	59 kg
Silver medal – second place	2014 Tehran	59 kg
Silver medal – second place	2009 Baku	55 kg
Silver medal – second place	2010 Tbilisi	55 kg
Silver medal – second place	2012 Mariopol	60 kg
Asian Junior Championship
Gold medal – first place	2008 Doha	55 kg

Mohsen Hajipour (Persian: محسن حاجی‌پور, born 29 August 1988) is an Iranian Greco-Roman wrestler. He won the silver medal in the 59 kg event at the Asian Indoor Games held in Ashgabat, Turkmenistan and winner the bronze medal in the 2011 Asian Championships held in Tashkent.
