= Nirmala Devi (wrestler) =

Indian wrestler (born 1984)

Personal information
- Born: 26 June 1984 (age 42) Hisar district, Haryana, India
- Height: 162 cm (5 ft 4 in)
- Weight: 48 kg (106 lb)

Sport
- Sport: Wrestling
- Event: Freestyle
- Club: Centre Sports Club; Hisar
- Coached by: Rajinder Singh
Medal record
Representing India
Women's freestyle wrestling
Asian Championships
Silver medal – second place	2020 New Delhi	50 kg
Commonwealth Games
Silver medal – second place	2010 New Delhi	48 kg
Commonwealth Championship
Gold medal – first place	2013 Johannesburg	48 kg
Gold medal – first place	2007 London	48 kg
Gold medal – first place	2005 Stellenbosch	48 kg
Silver medal – second place	2017 Brakpan	50 kg
Silver medal – second place	2009 Jalandhar	48 kg

Nirmala Devi (born 26 June 1984) is an Indian freestyle wrestler. She won a silver medal in the women's freestyle 48 kg event at the 2010 Commonwealth Games.

She was born to Ishwar Singh and Kitabo Devi. Nirmala is the eldest of Ishwar Singh's five children. Poonam, the youngest, is also a wrestler. Nirmala took up wrestling seriously in 2001 and then went on to win the national championship in the same year.

She hails from Hisar district in Haryana and works for Haryana Police. She became a sub-inspector in 2007 after receiving a gold medal at the 2007 Commonwealth Championship in Canada. She also won a gold medal in international wrestling in Spain in 2010.
