= Ravinder Khatri =

Indian Greco-Roman wrestler

Personal information
- Nationality: India
- Born: 15 May 1992 (age 34) Haryana, India
- Height: 180 cm (5 ft 11 in)

Sport
- Style: Greco-Roman
- Club: Army Sport Institute
- Coach: Hawa Singh

Ravinder Khatri (born 15 May 1992) is an Indian Greco-Roman wrestler who competes in the 85 kg category.

== Early years ==
Khatri was born on 15 May 1992 as the son of a farmer. He began wrestling at the akharas of his village, Bodia, located in Jhajjar district, Haryana. In 2006, he was selected by the Army Institute of Sport in Pune during a talent scouting event. He became a Junior commissioned officer for the Jat Regiment in 2011.

== Career ==
In March 2016, Khatri secured the bronze medal at Men's 85 kg Greco-Roman event at the 2016 Asian Wrestling Olympic Qualification Tournament, missing out on an Olympic berth as top two wrestlers qualified for the 2016 Summer Olympics. However, in May 2016, Khatri gained qualification for the Olympics as the silver medal winner of the tournament, Janarbek Kenjeev of Kyrgyzstan, was disqualified after testing positive.
