= Daichi Takatani =

Japanese freestyle wrestler

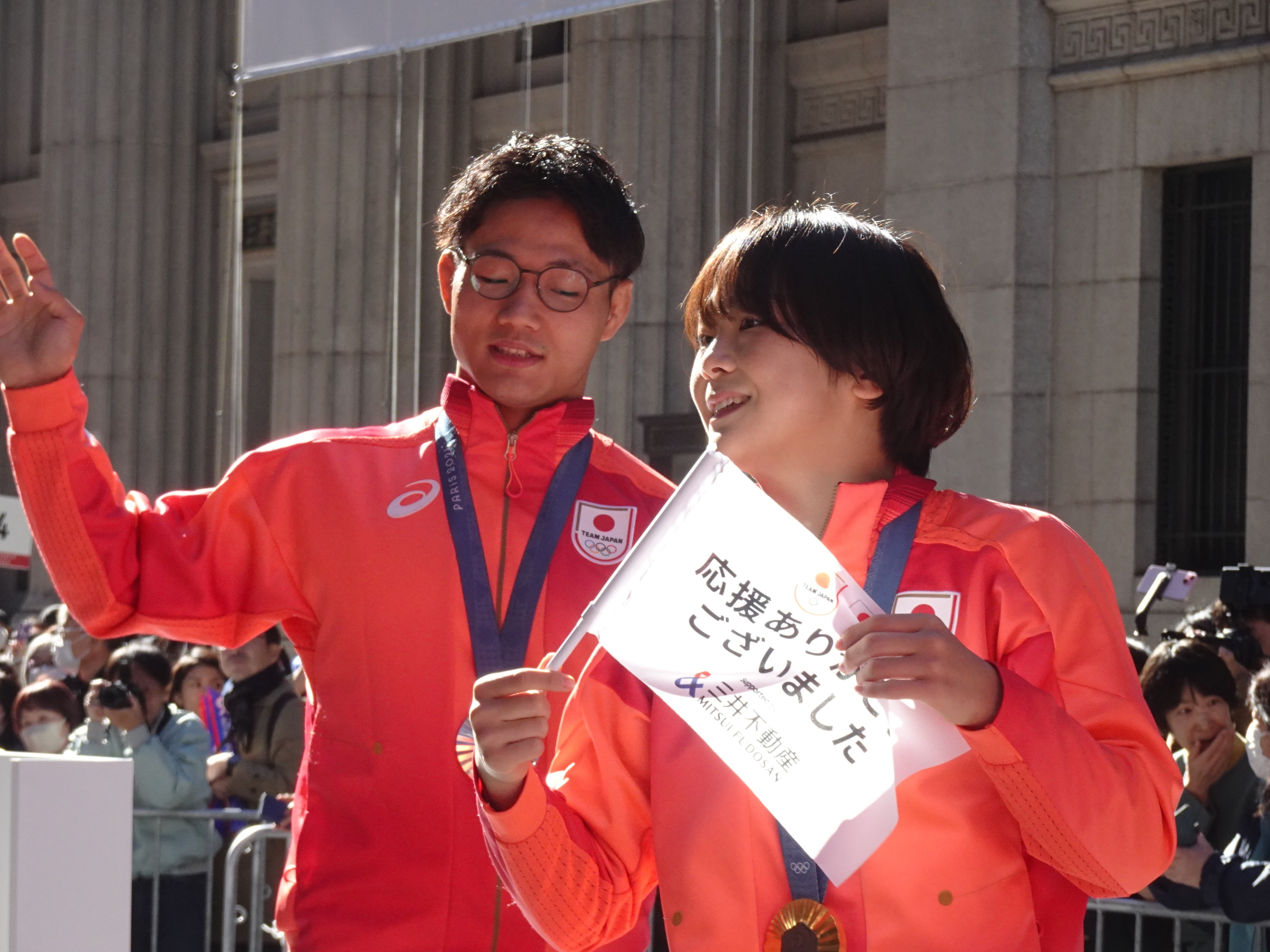
- Takatani (left) at Paris 2024 Summer Olympians and Paralympians Japan National Team parade event on November 30, 2024

Personal information
- Native name: 高谷大地
- Born: 22 November 1994 (age 31) Kyotango, Kyoto Prefecture, Japan
- Height: 169 cm (5 ft 7 in)

Sport
- Country: Japan
- Sport: Wrestling
- Weight class: 74 kg
- Event: Freestyle
- Club: Takushoku University
- Coached by: Shigeki Nishiguchi
Medal record
Men's freestyle wrestling
Representing Japan
Olympic Games
Silver medal – second place	2024 Paris	74 kg
World Championships
Bronze medal – third place	2023 Belgrade	74 kg
World Cup
Bronze medal – third place	2019 Yakutsk	Team
Asian Games
Silver medal – second place	2018 Jakarta	65 kg
Asian Indoor and Martial Arts Games
Silver medal – second place	2017 Ashgabat	65 kg
Asian Championships
Silver medal – second place	2018 Bishkek	65 kg
Bronze medal – third place	2022 Ulan-Baatar	74 kg
Bronze medal – third place	2020 New Delhi	74 kg
Grand Prix
Gold medal – first place	2016 Yakutsk	65 kg
Japan National Championships
Gold medal – first place	2013 Tokyo	60 kg
Gold medal – first place	2017 Tokyo	65 kg
Gold medal – first place	2021 Tokyo	74 kg
Gold medal – first place	2022 Tokyo	74 kg
Gold medal – first place	2023 Tokyo	74 kg
Silver medal – second place	2014 Tokyo	65 kg
Silver medal – second place	2018 Tokyo	65 kg
Silver medal – second place	2019 Tokyo	74 kg
Silver medal – second place	2020 Tokyo	74 kg
Bronze medal – third place	2013 Tokyo	66 kg
Bronze medal – third place	2016 Tokyo	65 kg
Bronze medal – third place	2021 Tokyo	74 kg
U20 World Championships
Bronze medal – third place	2014 Zagreb	66 kg
U17 World Championships
Bronze medal – third place	2011 Szombathely	54 kg

Daichi Takatani (高谷大地, Takatani Daichi; born 22 November 1994) is a Japanese freestyle wrestler. He won the silver medal in the 65 kg event at the 2018 Asian Games in Jakarta, Indonesia. In the same year, he also won the silver medal in the 65 kg event at the 2018 Asian Wrestling Championships held in Bishkek, Kyrgyzstan.

He competed in the 74 kg event at the 2022 World Wrestling Championships held in Belgrade, Serbia.

== Achievements ==
Year	Tournament	Location	Result	Event
2018	Asian Championships	Bishkek, Kyrgyzstan	2nd	Freestyle 65 kg
2018	Asian Games	Jakarta, Indonesia	2nd	Freestyle 65 kg
2020	Asian Championships	New Delhi, India	3rd	Freestyle 74 kg
2022	Asian Championships	Ulaanbaatar, Mongolia	3rd	Freestyle 74 kg
2024	Summer Olympics	Paris, France	2nd	Freestyle 74 kg
