= Muhamad Ikromov =

Tajikistani amateur wrestler

Muhamad Ikromov Мухамад Икромов
Personal information
- Native name: Tajik: Мухамад Фуркатчонович Икромов
- Full name: Muhamad Furkatdzhonovich Ikromov
- Nationality: (Tajikistan) Tajikistani
- Born: 15 October 1998 (age 27) Chorkuh, Sughd Region, Tajikistan
- Height: 168 cm (5 ft 6 in)

Sport
- Country: Tajikistan
- Sport: Wrestling
- Weight class: 61kg
- Rank: International master of sports
- Event: Freestyle
- Club: Olympic training center (Khasavyurt, Dagestan)
- Coached by: Furkat Ikromov; Ali Iskhakov
Medal record
Men's freestyle wrestling
Representing Tajikistan
Asian Championships
| Silver medal – second place | 2020 New Delhi | 61 kg |
CIS Games
| Silver medal – second place | 2021 Kazan | 61 kg |

Muhamad Furkatdzhonovich Ikromov (Tajik: Мухамад Фуркатчонович Икромов; born 15 October 1998) is a Tajik freestyle wrestler and 2020 Asian Championships silver medalist at 61 kilos.

== Background ==
Muhamad was born and raised in Chorkuh village, Tajikistan. He started wrestling at the age of eleven under his father Furkat, then he moved to Khasavyurt, Dagestan, Russia and currently trains there with his countryman Mustafo Akhmedov.

== Sport career ==
Ikromov was twice world team member. In 2019, Muhamad came third at the Grand prix of Spain in the 57 kg event. and was 19th at the 2019 World Championships in Astana, Kazakhstan. In 2020, he became runner-up in the men's freestyle 61 kg event at the Asian Championships in New Delhi, India, also competed at the Individual World Cup in Serbia. In 2021, he took the silver medal at the first CIS Games in Kazan, Tatarstan, Russia In 2022, he finished in 21st place at the World Championships. In 2024, he competed at the Ivan Yarygin cup.

== Achievements ==
- 2019 Grand prix of Spain — 3rd;
- 2020 Asian Championships — 2nd;
- 2021 CIS Games — 2nd;
