= Ayaulym Kassymova =

Kazakhstani freestyle wrestler

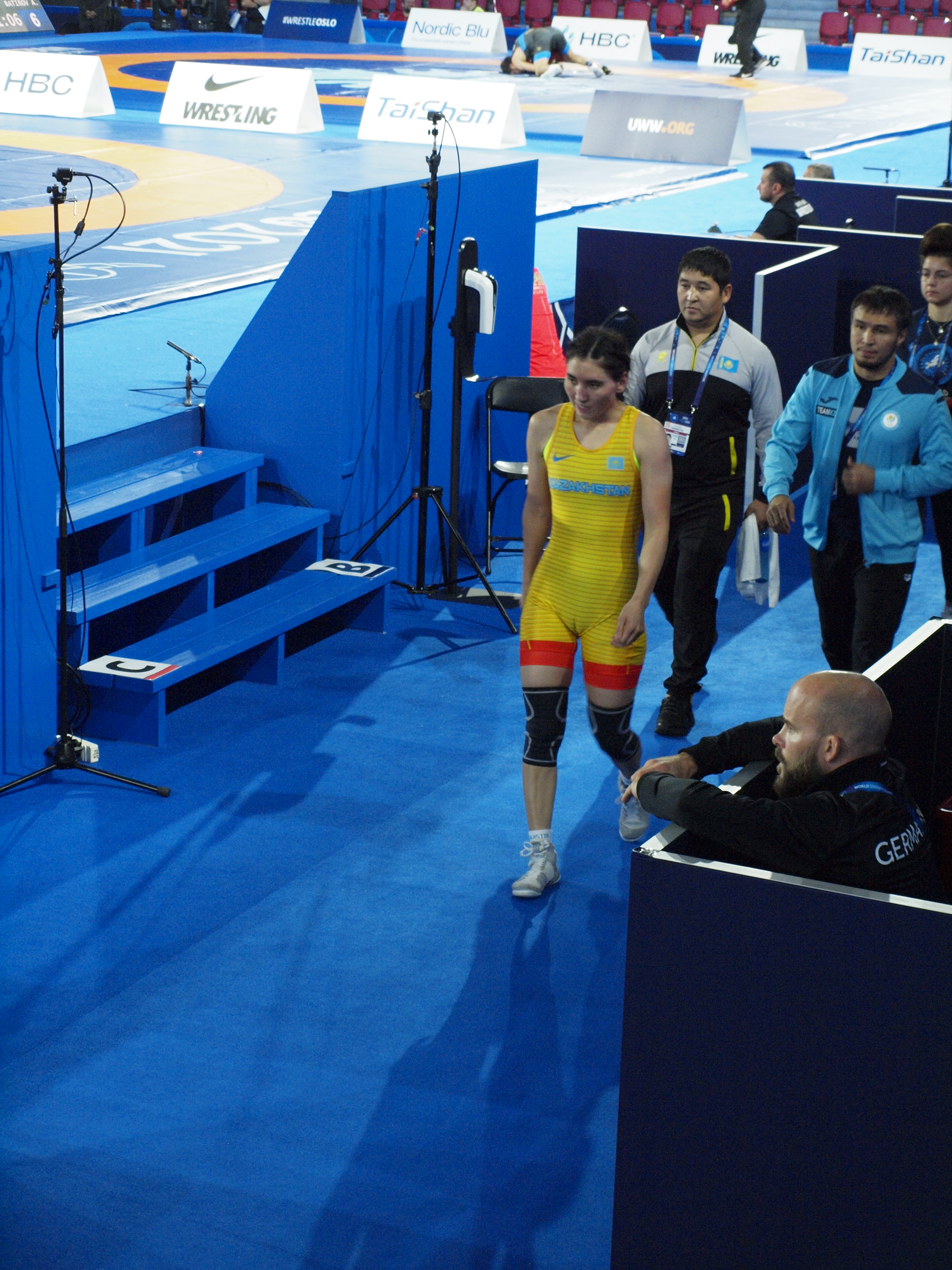

Personal information
- Born: 12 May 1994 (age 32)

Sport
- Country: Kazakhstan
- Sport: Amateur wrestling
- Weight class: 62 kg
- Event: Freestyle
Medal record
Women's freestyle wrestling
Representing Kazakhstan
Asian Championships
Silver medal – second place	2020 New Delhi	62 kg
Bronze medal – third place	2017 New Delhi	60 kg
Asian Indoor and Martial Arts Games
Silver medal – second place	2017 Ashgabat	63 kg

Ayaulym Kassymova (born 12 May 1994) is a Kazakhstani freestyle wrestler. She won the silver medal in the women's 63 kg event at the 2017 Asian Indoor and Martial Arts Games held in Ashgabat, Turkmenistan.

== Career ==
In 2018, Kassymova competed in the women's freestyle 62 kg event at the Asian Games in Jakarta, Indonesia without winning a medal. She was eliminated in her second match by Sakshi Malik of India.

In 2020, Kassymova won the silver medal in the 62 kg event at the Asian Wrestling Championships held in New Delhi, India. In the final, she lost against Yukako Kawai of Japan.

In April 2021, Kassymova competed at the Asian Olympic Qualification Tournament hoping to qualify for the 2020 Summer Olympics in Tokyo, Japan. In October 2021, she competed in the 62 kg event at the World Wrestling Championships held in Oslo, Norway.

In 2022, she competed at the Yasar Dogu Tournament held in Istanbul, Turkey. She competed in the 62 kg event at the 2022 World Wrestling Championships held in Belgrade, Serbia where she was eliminated in her first match.

== Achievements ==
Year	Tournament	Location	Result	Event
2017	Asian Championships	New Delhi, India	3rd	Freestyle 60 kg
2017	Asian Indoor and Martial Arts Games	Ashgabat, Turkmenistan	2nd	Freestyle 63 kg
2020	Asian Championships	New Delhi, India	2nd	Freestyle 62 kg
