= Miho Igarashi =

Japanese freestyle wrestler

Personal information
- Born: 17 January 1997 (age 29)
- Height: 154 cm (5 ft 1 in)

Sport
- Country: Japan
- Sport: Amateur wrestling
- Event: Freestyle
Medal record
Women's freestyle wrestling
Representing Japan
Asian Championships
Gold medal – first place	2020 New Delhi	50 kg
Asian Indoor and Martial Arts Games
Silver medal – second place	2017 Ashgabat	48 kg
World U23 Championships
Gold medal – first place	2017 Bydgoszcz	53 kg
Gold medal – first place	2018 Bucharest	50 kg
Junior World Championships
Gold medal – first place	2015 Salvador da Bahia	48 kg
Gold medal – first place	2016 Mâcon	48 kg

Miho Igarashi (born 17 January 1997) is a Japanese freestyle wrestler. She won the gold medal in the 50 kg event at the 2020 Asian Wrestling Championships in New Delhi, India.

She won the gold medal in the women's 48 kg event at the 2015 World Junior Wrestling Championships held in Salvador da Bahia, Brazil. She also won the gold medal in this event at the 2016 World Junior Wrestling Championships held in Mâcon, France. At the 2017 Asian Indoor and Martial Arts Games held in Ashgabat, Turkmenistan, she won the silver medal in the 48 kg event.

== Achievements ==
Year	Tournament	Location	Result	Event
2017	Asian Indoor and Martial Arts Games	Ashgabat, Turkmenistan	2nd	Freestyle 48 kg
2020	Asian Championships	New Delhi, India	1st	Freestyle 50 kg
