= Rustam Iskandari =

Tajikistani freestyle wrestler

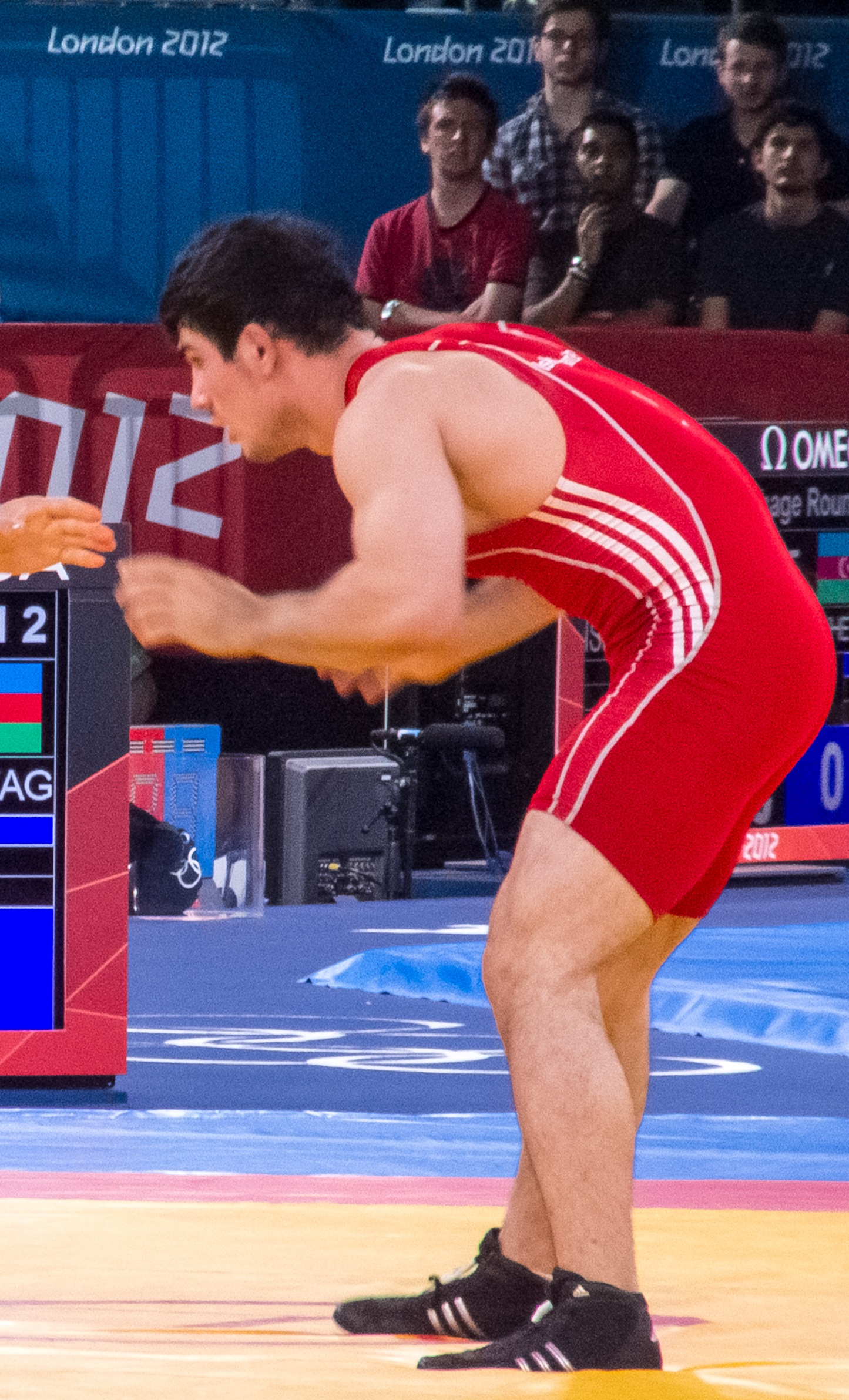
- Rustam Iskandari in 2012

Personal information
- Born: 18 August 1991 (age 34) Kulyab, Tajik SSR, Soviet Union
- Height: 1.84 m (6 ft 0 in)
- Weight: 96 kg (212 lb)

Sport
- Sport: Freestyle wrestling

Rustam Iskandari (born 18 August 1991 in Kulyab) is a Tajikistani freestyle wrestler. He competed in the freestyle 96 kg event at the 2012 Summer Olympics; he was defeated by Valerii Andriitsev in the 1/8 finals and eliminated by Khetag Gazyumov in the repechage round.
