= 2016 Asian Wrestling Championships – Results =

These are the results of the 2016 Asian Wrestling Championships which took place between 17 February and 21 February 2016 in Bangkok, Thailand.

== Men's freestyle ==
=== 57 kg ===
20 February

Round of 16
Sodnomdashiin Batbold (MGL)	3
Sandeep Tomar (IND)	5
Tang Yong Siang (SIN)	0
Wu Chin-fu (TPE)	8
Meretmuhammet Ataýew (TKM)	0
Younes Sarmasti (IRI)	11
Muhammad Bilal (PAK)	0
Yosuke Kawano (JPN)	10
Ulukbek Zholdoshbekov (KGZ)	6
Darkhan Beisenov (KAZ)	3
Liang Shaofeng (CHN)	9
Makhmudjon Shavkatov (UZB)	10
Kritsada Kongsrichai (THA)	1
Kim Sung-gwon (KOR)	14^{F}
Dzhamshed Sharifov (TJK)	0
Jong Hak-jin (PRK)	7

Quarterfinals
Sandeep Tomar (IND)	10
Wu Chin-fu (TPE)	0
Younes Sarmasti (IRI)	13
Yosuke Kawano (JPN)	2
Ulukbek Zholdoshbekov (KGZ)	10
Makhmudjon Shavkatov (UZB)	6
Kim Sung-gwon (KOR)	2
Jong Hak-jin (PRK)	5

Semifinals
Sandeep Tomar (IND)	10
Younes Sarmasti (IRI)	8
Ulukbek Zholdoshbekov (KGZ)	0
Jong Hak-jin (PRK)	10

Final
Sandeep Tomar (IND)	7
Jong Hak-jin (PRK)	5

Repechage round 1
Sodnomdashiin Batbold (MGL)	10
Wu Chin-fu (TPE)	0
Dzhamshed Sharifov (TJK)	0
Kim Sung-gwon (KOR)	8

Bronze medals
Sodnomdashiin Batbold (MGL)	16
Younes Sarmasti (IRI)	8
Kim Sung-gwon (KOR)	0
Ulukbek Zholdoshbekov (KGZ)	4^{F}

=== 61 kg ===
21 February

Round of 16
Tümenbilegiin Tüvshintulga (MGL)	4
Mukhamadsidik Djuraev (UZB)	4
Rahul Aware (IND)	10
Nguyễn Văn Sáng (VIE)	0
Behnam Ehsanpour (IRI)	15
Keisuke Otoguro (JPN)	4

Quarterfinals
Jhonny Morte (PHI)	0
Zhang Buladaoriji (CHN)	10
Charles Fernando (SRI)	0
Daulet Niyazbekov (KAZ)	10
Berdi Atabaýew (TKM)	1
Tümenbilegiin Tüvshintulga (MGL)	8
Rahul Aware (IND)	0
Behnam Ehsanpour (IRI)	10

Semifinals
Zhang Buladaoriji (CHN)	0
Daulet Niyazbekov (KAZ)	10
Tümenbilegiin Tüvshintulga (MGL)	1
Behnam Ehsanpour (IRI)	2

Final
Daulet Niyazbekov (KAZ)	10
Behnam Ehsanpour (IRI)	0

Repechage round 1
Keisuke Otoguro (JPN)	10
Rahul Aware (IND)	0

Bronze medals
Charles Fernando (SRI)	2
Zhang Buladaoriji (CHN)	12
Keisuke Otoguro (JPN)	4
Tümenbilegiin Tüvshintulga (MGL)	9

=== 65 kg ===
20 February

Round of 32
Ulukman Mamatov (KGZ)	2–12	Batchuluuny Batmagnai (MGL)
Jirawat Iamsamang (THA)	0–10	Meisam Nassiri (IRI)
Maruf Nurilloev (UZB)	4–0	Ngô Thế Sao (VIE)

Round of 16
Chang Yu-hsuan (TPE)	0
Abdulqosim Fayziev (TJK)	6^{F}
Abdulrahman Ibrahim (QAT)	2
Ma Cunjun (CHN)	4^{F}
Yang Jae-hoon (KOR)	2
Nurlan Bekzhanov (KAZ)	9
Nadir (PAK)	6
Mohammed Waheed (IRQ)	5^{F}
Bajrang Punia (IND)	3
Jon Kum-su (PRK)	5
Saparmyrat Myradow (TKM)	0
Masakazu Kamoi (JPN)	10
Chamara Perera (SRI)	0
Batchuluuny Batmagnai (MGL)	10
Meisam Nassiri (IRI)	12
Maruf Nurilloev (UZB)	2

Quarterfinals
Abdulqosim Fayziev (TJK)	0
Ma Cunjun (CHN)	10
Nurlan Bekzhanov (KAZ)	10
Mohammed Waheed (IRQ)	0
Jon Kum-su (PRK)	2
Masakazu Kamoi (JPN)	5
Batchuluuny Batmagnai (MGL)	2
Meisam Nassiri (IRI)	13

Semifinals
Ma Cunjun (CHN)	5
Nurlan Bekzhanov (KAZ)	6
Masakazu Kamoi (JPN)	0
Meisam Nassiri (IRI)	11

Final
Nurlan Bekzhanov (KAZ)	0
Meisam Nassiri (IRI)	9

Repechage round 1
Jirawat Iamsamang (THA)	0
Maruf Nurilloev (UZB)	10

Repechage round 2
Yang Jae-hoon (KOR)
Mohammed Waheed (IRQ)	WO
Maruf Nurilloev (UZB)	6
Batchuluuny Batmagnai (MGL)	7

Bronze medals
Mohammed Waheed (IRQ)	0
Ma Cunjun (CHN)	10
Batchuluuny Batmagnai (MGL)	9^{F}
Masakazu Kamoi (JPN)	4

=== 70 kg ===
21 February

Round of 16
Nobuyoshi Takojima (JPN)	0
Adam Batirov (BRN)	7
Azat Sakayev (KAZ)	3
Elaman Dogdurbek Uulu (KGZ)	1
Buyanjavyn Batzorig (MGL)	4^{F}
Suthija Maduranga (SRI)	0
Vinod Kumar Omprakash (IND)	6
Menghejigan (CHN)	4
Davran Avezov (UZB)	9
Cấn Tất Dự (VIE)	10

Quarterfinals
Padipat Wantawong (THA)	0
Mohammad Naderi (IRI)	10
Batyr Borjakow (TKM)	0
Adam Batirov (BRN)	11
Azat Sakayev (KAZ)	4
Buyanjavyn Batzorig (MGL)	5
Vinod Kumar Omprakash (IND)	9
Cấn Tất Dự (VIE)	2

Semifinals
Mohammad Naderi (IRI)	2
Adam Batirov (BRN)	7
Buyanjavyn Batzorig (MGL)	5
Vinod Kumar Omprakash (IND)	8

Final
Adam Batirov (BRN)	5
Vinod Kumar Omprakash (IND)	2

Repechage round 1
Nobuyoshi Takojima (JPN)	WO
Batyr Borjakow (TKM)
Menghejigan (CHN)	10
Cấn Tất Dự (VIE)	0

Bronze medals
Nobuyoshi Takojima (JPN)	7
Mohammad Naderi (IRI)	10
Menghejigan (CHN)	3
Buyanjavyn Batzorig (MGL)	3

=== 74 kg ===
20 February

Round of 16
Dorjvaanchigiin Gombodorj (MGL)	10
Feng Chunfu (CHN)	0
Islomiddin Rakhimov (UZB)	0
Saiakbai Usupov (KGZ)	10
Kohei Kitamura (JPN)	3
Mostafa Hosseinkhani (IRI)	4
Ahmed Mohsin (IRQ)	2
Döwletmyrat Orazgylyjow (TKM)	0
Muhammad Asad Butt (PAK)	0
Jitender Kumar (IND)	10
Azamat Sufiev (TJK)	2
Kim Dai-sung (KOR)	2
Zhiger Zakirov (KAZ)	6^{F}
Ishan Abeyrathna (SRI)	0

Quarterfinals
Mohamed Al-Qubaisi (UAE)	0
Dorjvaanchigiin Gombodorj (MGL)	11
Saiakbai Usupov (KGZ)	1
Mostafa Hosseinkhani (IRI)	12
Ahmed Mohsin (IRQ)	0
Jitender Kumar (IND)	10
Azamat Sufiev (TJK)	0
Zhiger Zakirov (KAZ)	10

Semifinals
Dorjvaanchigiin Gombodorj (MGL)	0
Mostafa Hosseinkhani (IRI)	7
Jitender Kumar (IND)	4
Zhiger Zakirov (KAZ)	7

Final
Mostafa Hosseinkhani (IRI)	WO
Zhiger Zakirov (KAZ)

Repechage round 1
Kohei Kitamura (JPN)	2
Saiakbai Usupov (KGZ)	5
Ishan Abeyrathna (SRI)	0
Azamat Sufiev (TJK)	10

Bronze medals
Saiakbai Usupov (KGZ)	2
Dorjvaanchigiin Gombodorj (MGL)	1
Azamat Sufiev (TJK)	15
Jitender Kumar (IND)	4

=== 86 kg ===
21 February

Round of 16
Nalinda Kumara (SRI)	0
Gwon Hyeok-beom (KOR)	10
Aibek Usupov (KGZ)	12
Looi Yuan Hui (SIN)	0
Kao Ming-hung (TPE)	0
Orgodolyn Üitümen (MGL)	11
Somveer Kadian (IND)	11
Lin Zushen (CHN)	7
Ilfat Radjapov (UZB)	10
Ngô Văn Lâm (VIE)	0
Masao Matsusaka (JPN)	10
Selimmuhammet Muhadyýew (TKM)	0
Ehsan Lashgari (IRI)	5
Aslan Kakhidze (KAZ)	0

Quarterfinals
Bakhodur Kadirov (TJK)	3
Gwon Hyeok-beom (KOR)	5
Aibek Usupov (KGZ)	6
Orgodolyn Üitümen (MGL)	6^{F}
Somveer Kadian (IND)	6
Ilfat Radjapov (UZB)	2
Masao Matsusaka (JPN)	2
Ehsan Lashgari (IRI)	10

Semifinals
Gwon Hyeok-beom (KOR)	0
Orgodolyn Üitümen (MGL)	3
Somveer Kadian (IND)	0
Ehsan Lashgari (IRI)	10

Final
Orgodolyn Üitümen (MGL)	0
Ehsan Lashgari (IRI)	7

Repechage round 1
Kao Ming-hung (TPE)	0
Aibek Usupov (KGZ)	10
Aslan Kakhidze (KAZ)	8
Masao Matsusaka (JPN)	3

Bronze medals
Aibek Usupov (KGZ)	9
Gwon Hyeok-beom (KOR)	11
Aslan Kakhidze (KAZ)	13
Somveer Kadian (IND)	3

=== 97 kg ===
20 February

Round of 16
Hidayat Haron (SIN)	0
Magomed Musaev (KGZ)	10
Mausam Khatri (IND)	6
Koki Yamamoto (JPN)	10
Reza Yazdani (IRI)	10
Ekkapong Jannee (THA)	0
Sukhrobjon Mukaramov (UZB)	5^{F}
Rustam Iskandari (TJK)	2
Chaganzhana (CHN)	0
Dorjkhandyn Khüderbulga (MGL)	2
Ahmed Salah (IRQ)	8
Ýusup Melejaýew (TKM)	9

Quarterfinals
Bakdaulet Almentay (KAZ)	5
Yoon Chan-uk (KOR)	4
Magomed Musaev (KGZ)	6
Koki Yamamoto (JPN)	0
Reza Yazdani (IRI)	11^{F}
Sukhrobjon Mukaramov (UZB)	0
Dorjkhandyn Khüderbulga (MGL)	6^{F}
Ýusup Melejaýew (TKM)	2

Semifinals
Bakdaulet Almentay (KAZ)	4
Magomed Musaev (KGZ)	5
Reza Yazdani (IRI)	7
Dorjkhandyn Khüderbulga (MGL)	0

Final
Magomed Musaev (KGZ)	0
Reza Yazdani (IRI)	5^{F}

Repechage round 1
Hidayat Haron (SIN)	0
Koki Yamamoto (JPN)	10^{F}
Ekkapong Jannee (THA)	0
Sukhrobjon Mukaramov (UZB)	10

Bronze medals
Koki Yamamoto (JPN)	2
Bakdaulet Almentay (KAZ)	5
Sukhrobjon Mukaramov (UZB)	0
Dorjkhandyn Khüderbulga (MGL)	10

=== 125 kg ===
21 February

Round of 16
Shang Hai (CHN)	2^{F}
Francis Villanueva (PHI)	0
Daulet Shabanbay (KAZ)	10
Elnur Açylow (TKM)	0
Sumit Malik (IND)	7
Diyor Aralov (UZB)	1
Dinesh Jayasinghe (SRI)	0
Nam Kyung-jin (KOR)	2^{F}
Natsagsürengiin Zolboo (MGL)	0
Parviz Hadi (IRI)	10
Farkhod Anakulov (TJK)	8
Zaman Anwar (PAK)	11

Quarterfinals
Tetsuya Tanaka (JPN)	0
Aiaal Lazarev (KGZ)	12
Shang Hai (CHN)	0
Daulet Shabanbay (KAZ)	6^{F}
Sumit Malik (IND)	1
Nam Kyung-jin (KOR)	4
Parviz Hadi (IRI)	10
Zaman Anwar (PAK)	0

Semifinals
Aiaal Lazarev (KGZ)	6
Daulet Shabanbay (KAZ)	6
Nam Kyung-jin (KOR)	6
Parviz Hadi (IRI)	12

Final
Daulet Shabanbay (KAZ)	1
Parviz Hadi (IRI)	3

Repechage round 1
Elnur Açylow (TKM)
Shang Hai (CHN)	WO
Natsagsürengiin Zolboo (MGL)	8
Zaman Anwar (PAK)	2

Bronze medals
Shang Hai (CHN)	0
Aiaal Lazarev (KGZ)	10^{F}
Natsagsürengiin Zolboo (MGL)	9
Nam Kyung-jin (KOR)	2

== Men's Greco-Roman ==
=== 59 kg ===
18 February

Round of 16
Khasan Sufiev (TJK)	0
Saman Abdevali (IRI)	9
Gaurav Sharma (IND)	0
Kanybek Zholchubekov (KGZ)	8
Shota Tanokura (JPN)	7
Kwon Un-jin (PRK)	5
Karrar Abbas (IRQ)	8
Liu Shih-shu (TPE)	0
Kim Eun-bin (KOR)	8
Firuz Tukhtaev (UZB)	0

Quarterfinals
Meirambek Ainagulov (KAZ)	8
Seýdylla Täzäýew (TKM)	0
Ritisak Pravan (THA)	0
Saman Abdevali (IRI)	9
Kanybek Zholchubekov (KGZ)	12
Shota Tanokura (JPN)	2
Karrar Abbas (IRQ)	1
Kim Eun-bin (KOR)	4

Semifinals
Meirambek Ainagulov (KAZ)	6
Saman Abdevali (IRI)	10
Kanybek Zholchubekov (KGZ)	8
Kim Eun-bin (KOR)	0

Final
Saman Abdevali (IRI)	4
Kanybek Zholchubekov (KGZ)	9

Repechage round 1
Khasan Sufiev (TJK)	4
Ritisak Pravan (THA)	12
Gaurav Sharma (IND)	2
Shota Tanokura (JPN)	2

Bronze medals
Ritisak Pravan (THA)	0
Meirambek Ainagulov (KAZ)	8^{F}
Gaurav Sharma (IND)	2
Kim Eun-bin (KOR)	1

=== 66 kg ===
17 February

Round of 16
Nurgazy Asangulov (KGZ)	0
Aram Vardanyan (UZB)	8
Mansur Nurberdiýew (TKM)	12^{F}
Apichai Natal (THA)	4
Jon Won-chol (PRK)	0
Askhat Zhanbirov (KAZ)	8
Tsuchika Shimoyamada (JPN)	10
Deepak Kumar (IND)	0

Quarterfinals
Zhang Gaoquan (CHN)	8
Azizbeki Sharifzoda (TJK)	0
Choi Gi-uk (KOR)	3
Mehdi Zeidvand (IRI)	0
Aram Vardanyan (UZB)	8
Mansur Nurberdiýew (TKM)	0
Askhat Zhanbirov (KAZ)	6
Tsuchika Shimoyamada (JPN)	0

Semifinals
Zhang Gaoquan (CHN)	0
Choi Gi-uk (KOR)	2
Aram Vardanyan (UZB)	2
Askhat Zhanbirov (KAZ)	4

Final
Choi Gi-uk (KOR)	1
Askhat Zhanbirov (KAZ)	1

Repechage round 1
Jon Won-chol (PRK)	8
Tsuchika Shimoyamada (JPN)	0

Bronze medals
Mehdi Zeidvand (IRI)	5
Zhang Gaoquan (CHN)	2
Jon Won-chol (PRK)	6
Aram Vardanyan (UZB)	8

=== 71 kg ===
18 February

Round of 16
Yun Jong-gyu (KOR)	13
Takahiro Yamamoto (JPN)	5

Quarterfinals
Darkhan Bayakhmetov (KAZ)	0
Afshin Biabangard (IRI)	1
Manjeet (IND)	0
Didar Amannazarow (TKM)	4^{F}
Nurbek Kholmukhammatov (UZB)	8
Xu Kai-xiang (TPE)	0
Zhang Ridong (CHN)	1
Yun Jong-gyu (KOR)	0

Semifinals
Afshin Biabangard (IRI)	6^{F}
Didar Amannazarow (TKM)	0
Nurbek Kholmukhammatov (UZB)	8
Zhang Ridong (CHN)	0

Final
Afshin Biabangard (IRI)	8
Nurbek Kholmukhammatov (UZB)	0

Bronze medals
Darkhan Bayakhmetov (KAZ)	11
Didar Amannazarow (TKM)	2
Xu Kai-xiang (TPE)	0
Zhang Ridong (CHN)	8

=== 75 kg ===
17 February

Round of 16
Takehiro Kanakubo (JPN)	0
Ruslan Tsarev (KGZ)	2
Park Sang-hyeok (KOR)	5^{F}
Trần Văn Hiếu (VIE)	0
Na Junjie (CHN)	3
Gurpreet Singh (IND)	2
Rabbia Khalil (PLE)	0
Payam Boveiri (IRI)	8
Şermet Permanow (TKM)	3
Hussein Abbas (IRQ)	1
Lin Wen-hsuan (TPE)	2
Doszhan Kartikov (KAZ)	12

Quarterfinals
Dilshod Turdiev (UZB)	4
Bakhit Sharif Badr (QAT)	0
Ruslan Tsarev (KGZ)	5
Park Sang-hyeok (KOR)	5
Na Junjie (CHN)	0
Payam Boveiri (IRI)	2
Şermet Permanow (TKM)	0
Doszhan Kartikov (KAZ)	8

Semifinals
Dilshod Turdiev (UZB)	5
Ruslan Tsarev (KGZ)	2
Payam Boveiri (IRI)	4
Doszhan Kartikov (KAZ)	6

Final
Dilshod Turdiev (UZB)	0
Doszhan Kartikov (KAZ)	4

Repechage round 1
Lin Wen-hsuan (TPE)	2
Şermet Permanow (TKM)	2^{F}

Bronze medals
Bakhit Sharif Badr (QAT)	0
Ruslan Tsarev (KGZ)	8
Şermet Permanow (TKM)	0
Payam Boveiri (IRI)	8

=== 80 kg ===
17 February

Round of 16
Kim Jin-hyeok (KOR)	0
Askhat Dilmukhamedov (KAZ)	4
Ramin Taheri (IRI)	8
Yuya Maeta (JPN)	0

Quarterfinals
Harpreet Singh Sandhu (IND)	6
Samatbek Chonoraliev (KGZ)	1
Aishan Aisha (CHN)	2
Jonibek Otabekov (UZB)	0
Su Wei-zhi (TPE)	0
Nghiêm Đình Hiếu (VIE)	9
Askhat Dilmukhamedov (KAZ)	3
Ramin Taheri (IRI)	3

Semifinals
Harpreet Singh Sandhu (IND)	2
Aishan Aisha (CHN)	4
Nghiêm Đình Hiếu (VIE)	0
Ramin Taheri (IRI)	8

Final
Aishan Aisha (CHN)	0
Ramin Taheri (IRI)	8

Repechage round 1
Yuya Maeta (JPN)	1
Askhat Dilmukhamedov (KAZ)	4

Bronze medals
Jonibek Otabekov (UZB)	1
Harpreet Singh Sandhu (IND)	2
Askhat Dilmukhamedov (KAZ)	8
Nghiêm Đình Hiếu (VIE)	0

=== 85 kg ===
18 February

Round of 16
Khussein Mutsolgov (KAZ)	2
Kong Liang (CHN)	8
Shobhit Kumar (IND)	11^{F}
Thirayut Bunphet (THA)	0
Adil Ghazi (IRQ)	8
Trần Văn Tuấn (VIE)	0

Quarterfinals
Yuya Okajima (JPN)	0
Yousef Ghaderian (IRI)	9
Muhammadali Shamsiddinov (UZB)	8
Park Jin-sung (KOR)	6
Janarbek Kenjeev (KGZ)	7
Kong Liang (CHN)	1
Shobhit Kumar (IND)	6
Adil Ghazi (IRQ)	4

Semifinals
Yousef Ghaderian (IRI)	3
Muhammadali Shamsiddinov (UZB)	5
Janarbek Kenjeev (KGZ)	12
Shobhit Kumar (IND)	0

Final
Muhammadali Shamsiddinov (UZB)	2
Janarbek Kenjeev (KGZ)	3

Bronze medals
Park Jin-sung (KOR)	8
Yousef Ghaderian (IRI)	2
Kong Liang (CHN)	6
Shobhit Kumar (IND)	6

=== 98 kg ===
17 February

Round of 16
Mehdi Aliyari (IRI)	4^{F}
Arslan Saparmämmedow (TKM)	0
Sukhrob Fattoev (UZB)	0
Mohamed Abdelfatah (BRN)	8
Yahia Abutabeekh (JOR)	2
Kim Seung-jun (KOR)	10
Zhanarbek Kabdolov (KAZ)	12
Shi Wenhao (CHN)	2

Quarterfinals
Yasuhiro Yonehira (JPN)	0
Uzur Dzhuzupbekov (KGZ)	4^{F}
Ali Majeed (IRQ)	2
Hardeep Singh (IND)	3
Mehdi Aliyari (IRI)	4
Mohamed Abdelfatah (BRN)	2
Kim Seung-jun (KOR)	6
Zhanarbek Kabdolov (KAZ)	2

Semifinals
Uzur Dzhuzupbekov (KGZ)	3
Hardeep Singh (IND)	5
Mehdi Aliyari (IRI)	8
Kim Seung-jun (KOR)	0

Final
Hardeep Singh (IND)	0
Mehdi Aliyari (IRI)	7^{F}

Repechage round 1
Arslan Saparmämmedow (TKM)	0
Mohamed Abdelfatah (BRN)	8

Bronze medals
Ali Majeed (IRQ)	5
Uzur Dzhuzupbekov (KGZ)	6
Mohamed Abdelfatah (BRN)	5^{F}
Kim Seung-jun (KOR)	4

=== 130 kg ===
17 February

Round of 16
Muminjon Abdullaev (UZB)	8
Hirotake Tsuda (JPN)	0
Kim Min-seok (KOR)	6^{F}
Anucha Yospanya (THA)	2

Quarterfinals
Naveen Sevlia (IND)	2
Murat Ramonov (KGZ)	8
Shodi Bakhromov (TJK)	0
Sun He (CHN)	3^{F}
Amir Ghasemi Monjazi (IRI)	6
Damir Kuzembayev (KAZ)	0
Muminjon Abdullaev (UZB)	10
Kim Min-seok (KOR)	0

Semifinals
Murat Ramonov (KGZ)	7
Sun He (CHN)	4
Amir Ghasemi Monjazi (IRI)	3
Muminjon Abdullaev (UZB)	0

Final
Murat Ramonov (KGZ)	0
Amir Ghasemi Monjazi (IRI)	2^{F}

Bronze medals
Naveen Sevlia (IND)	6
Sun He (CHN)	4
Damir Kuzembayev (KAZ)	9
Muminjon Abdullaev (UZB)	0

== Women's freestyle ==
=== 48 kg ===
19 February

Round of 16
Luknam Bunson (THA)	0
Kim Hyon-gyong (PRK)	10
Ritu Phogat (IND)	1
Eri Tosaka (JPN)	1

Quarterfinals
Kang Eun-ju (KOR)	0
Irina Borissova (KAZ)	3^{F}
Vũ Thị Hằng (VIE)	11
Tsogt-Ochiryn Namuuntsetseg (MGL)	0
Sun Yanan (CHN)	10
Dauletbike Yakhshimuratova (UZB)	0
Kim Hyon-gyong (PRK)	4
Eri Tosaka (JPN)	5

Semifinals
Irina Borissova (KAZ)	16
Vũ Thị Hằng (VIE)	10
Sun Yanan (CHN)	5
Eri Tosaka (JPN)	4

Final
Irina Borissova (KAZ)	2
Sun Yanan (CHN)	12

Bronze medals
Kang Eun-ju (KOR)	0
Vũ Thị Hằng (VIE)	10
Dauletbike Yakhshimuratova (UZB)	2
Eri Tosaka (JPN)	12

=== 53 kg ===
19 February

Round of 16
Minalyn Foy-os (PHI)	0
Zukhra Mustanova (UZB)	11
Rozalia Tilegenova (KGZ)	4
Chiu Hsin-ju (TPE)	2^{F}
Pak Yong-mi (PRK)	12
Nanami Irie (JPN)	1
Zulfiya Yakhyarova (KAZ)	11
Ganbaataryn Otgonjargal (MGL)	1
Vinesh Phogat (IND)	3
Pang Qianyu (CHN)	7

Quarterfinals
Nguyễn Thị Lụa (VIE)	4^{F}
Orasa Sookdongyor (THA)	0
Oh Hyun-young (KOR)	8
Zukhra Mustanova (UZB)	4
Chiu Hsin-ju (TPE)	0
Pak Yong-mi (PRK)	2^{F}
Zulfiya Yakhyarova (KAZ)	1
Pang Qianyu (CHN)	3

Semifinals
Nguyễn Thị Lụa (VIE)	10
Oh Hyun-young (KOR)	0
Pak Yong-mi (PRK)	4
Pang Qianyu (CHN)	5

Final
Nguyễn Thị Lụa (VIE)	6
Pang Qianyu (CHN)	8^{F}

Repechage round 1
Vinesh Phogat (IND)	10
Zulfiya Yakhyarova (KAZ)	0

Bronze medals
Orasa Sookdongyor (THA)	0
Oh Hyun-young (KOR)	6^{F}
Vinesh Phogat (IND)	9^{F}
Pak Yong-mi (PRK)	4

=== 55 kg ===
19 February

Round of 16
Momoka Kadoya (JPN)	10
Sevara Eshmuratova (UZB)	0

Quarterfinals
Priyanka Phogat (IND)	12
Kiều Thị Ly (VIE)	2
Marina Sedneva (KAZ)	9
Bermet Nurlanbek Kyzy (KGZ)	13
Davaasükhiin Otgontsetseg (MGL)	9^{F}
Um Ji-eun (KOR)	9
Rong Ningning (CHN)	0
Momoka Kadoya (JPN)	10

Semifinals
Priyanka Phogat (IND)	2^{F}
Bermet Nurlanbek Kyzy (KGZ)	0
Davaasükhiin Otgontsetseg (MGL)	6
Momoka Kadoya (JPN)	5

Final
Priyanka Phogat (IND)	2
Davaasükhiin Otgontsetseg (MGL)	2

Bronze medals
Kiều Thị Ly (VIE)	14
Bermet Nurlanbek Kyzy (KGZ)	3
Um Ji-eun (KOR)	4
Momoka Kadoya (JPN)	2

=== 58 kg ===
20 February

Round of 16
Enkhbatyn Gantuyaa (MGL)	10
Kanittha Homsung (THA)	0
Aisuluu Tynybekova (KGZ)	4^{F}
Kim Ah-yeong (KOR)	0
Nabira Esenbaeva (UZB)	1
Sarita Mor (IND)	8

Quarterfinals
Aiyim Abdildina (KAZ)	5^{F}
Zhou Zhangting (CHN)	1
Mikako Higuchi (JPN)	14
Phạm Thị Loan (VIE)	3
Ri Yun-sim (PRK)	4
Enkhbatyn Gantuyaa (MGL)	6
Aisuluu Tynybekova (KGZ)	9
Sarita Mor (IND)	0

Semifinals
Aiyim Abdildina (KAZ)	2^{F}
Mikako Higuchi (JPN)	0
Enkhbatyn Gantuyaa (MGL)	4
Aisuluu Tynybekova (KGZ)	5

Final
Aiyim Abdildina (KAZ)	1
Aisuluu Tynybekova (KGZ)	2

Repechage round 1
Kim Ah-yeong (KOR)	2
Sarita Mor (IND)	6

Bronze medals
Zhou Zhangting (CHN)	12
Mikako Higuchi (JPN)	1
Sarita Mor (IND)	0
Enkhbatyn Gantuyaa (MGL)	10

=== 60 kg ===
19 February

Quarterfinals		Semifinals		Final
Ayaka Ito (JPN)	11
Đào Thị Hương (VIE)	0	Ayaka Ito (JPN)	10^{F}
Otgonbatyn Oyuuntuyaa (MGL)	8^{F}	Otgonbatyn Oyuuntuyaa (MGL)	2
Hong Hyang-rae (KOR)	0			Ayaka Ito (JPN)	4
Madina Bakbergenova (KAZ)	1			Han Yingyan (CHN)	6
Han Yingyan (CHN)	8	Han Yingyan (CHN)	10
Sakshi Malik (IND)	6	Sakshi Malik (IND)	0
Salomat Kuchimova (UZB)	0

Bronze medals
Đào Thị Hương (VIE)	0
Otgonbatyn Oyuuntuyaa (MGL)	4^{F}
Madina Bakbergenova (KAZ)	2^{F}
Sakshi Malik (IND)	0

=== 63 kg ===
18 February

Round of 16
Lý Thị Nguyệt (VIE)	6^{F}
Charmayne Hughes (SIN)	0
Olga Kalinina (KAZ)	1
Seo Hee-jeong (KOR)	7

Quarterfinals
Rim Jong-sim (PRK)	10^{F}
Nilufar Gadaeva (UZB)	2
Anita Sheoran (IND)	10
Bürneebaataryn Nyamgerel (MGL)	0
Xu Rui (CHN)	4
Risako Kawai (JPN)	8
Lý Thị Nguyệt (VIE)	2
Seo Hee-jeong (KOR)	12

Semifinals
Rim Jong-sim (PRK)	7
Anita Sheoran (IND)	4
Risako Kawai (JPN)	10
Seo Hee-jeong (KOR)	0

Final
Rim Jong-sim (PRK)	0
Risako Kawai (JPN)	6^{F}

Bronze medals
Nilufar Gadaeva (UZB)	0
Anita Sheoran (IND)	7^{F}
Xu Rui (CHN)	4^{F}
Seo Hee-jeong (KOR)	0

=== 69 kg ===
19 February

Quarterfinals		Semifinals		Final
Sara Dosho (JPN)	10
Park Chae-rin (KOR)	0	Sara Dosho (JPN)	13
Chen Wen-ling (TPE)	0	Zorigtyn Bolortungalag (MGL)	4
Zorigtyn Bolortungalag (MGL)	2^{F}			Sara Dosho (JPN)	11
Wang Jiao (CHN)	11			Elmira Syzdykova (KAZ)	1
Bakhtigul Baltaniyazova (UZB)	0	Wang Jiao (CHN)	6
Navjot Kaur (IND)	0	Elmira Syzdykova (KAZ)	6
Elmira Syzdykova (KAZ)	10

Bronze medals
Park Chae-rin (KOR)	0
Zorigtyn Bolortungalag (MGL)	8^{F}
Navjot Kaur (IND)	0
Wang Jiao (CHN)	7^{F}

=== 75 kg ===
18 February

Quarterfinals		Semifinals		Final
Hwang Eun-ju (KOR)
Kiran Bishnoi (IND)	WO	Kiran Bishnoi (IND)	1
Rino Abe (JPN)	8	Rino Abe (JPN)	3
Qiandegenchagan (CHN)	6			Rino Abe (JPN)	0
Lalakhan Orinbaeva (UZB)	0			Ochirbatyn Burmaa (MGL)	2
Ochirbatyn Burmaa (MGL)	6^{F}	Ochirbatyn Burmaa (MGL)	2^{F}
Chang Hui-tsz (TPE)	0	Gulmaral Yerkebayeva (KAZ)	2
Gulmaral Yerkebayeva (KAZ)	10

Bronze medals
Qiandegenchagan (CHN)	2^{F}
Kiran Bishnoi (IND)	0
Lalakhan Orinbaeva (UZB)	0
Gulmaral Yerkebayeva (KAZ)	10
