= 2015 World Wrestling Championships – Women's freestyle 48 kg =

Women's freestyle 48 kg at the 2015 World Championships
- Venue: Orleans Arena
- Dates: 9 September 2015
- Competitors: 35 from 35 nations

Medalists
gold medal	Eri Tosaka	Japan
silver medal	Mariya Stadnik	Azerbaijan
bronze medal	Jessica Blaszka	Netherlands
bronze medal	Geneviève Morrison	Canada

The women's freestyle 48 kilograms is a competition featured at the 2015 World Wrestling Championships, and was held in Las Vegas, United States on 9 September 2015.

With a bronze medal, Jessica Blaszka became the first wrestler to win a medal for the Netherlands at the World Wrestling Championships after 28 years.

== Results ==
Legend

- F — Won by fall

=== Finals ===
Semifinals		Final
Li Hui (CHN)	0
Mariya Stadnik (AZE)	4^{F}	Mariya Stadnik (AZE)	2
Eri Tosaka (JPN)	6	Eri Tosaka (JPN)	3
Geneviève Morrison (CAN)	4

=== Top half ===
==== Section 1 ====
Round of 64

Round of 32
Vũ Thị Hằng (VIE)	7
Alyssa Lampe (USA)	10^{F}
Kim Hyon-gyong (PRK)	8
Vinesh Phogat (IND)	4
Jaqueline Schellin (GER)	10
Iulia Leorda (MDA)	2
Evin Demirhan (TUR)	1
Li Hui (CHN)	11

Round of 16
Alyssa Lampe (USA)	5
Kim Hyon-gyong (PRK)	5
Jaqueline Schellin (GER)	0
Li Hui (CHN)	6

Quarterfinals
Alyssa Lampe (USA)	0
Li Hui (CHN)	10

==== Section 2 ====
Round of 64

Round of 32
Mayelis Caripá (VEN)	1
Thalía Mallqui (PER)	6^{F}
Jessica Blaszka (NED)	0
Mariya Stadnik (AZE)	11
Tatyana Amanzhol (KAZ)	11
Fredrika Petersson (SWE)	0
Julie Sabatié (FRA)	9
Elitsa Yankova (BUL)	15

Round of 16
Thalía Mallqui (PER)	0
Mariya Stadnik (AZE)	10
Tatyana Amanzhol (KAZ)	9
Elitsa Yankova (BUL)	8

Quarterfinals
Mariya Stadnik (AZE)	11
Tatyana Amanzhol (KAZ)	3

=== Bottom half ===
==== Section 3 ====
Round of 64

Round of 32
Dauletbike Yakhshimuratova (UZB)	8
Mariana Díaz (MEX)	6
Valentina Islamova (RUS)	3
Lee Yu-mi (KOR)	1
Liliana Santos (POR)	0
Yana Rattigan (GBR)	4^{F}
Eri Tosaka (JPN)	10
Erdenesükhiin Narangerel (MGL)	0

Round of 16
Dauletbike Yakhshimuratova (UZB)	0
Valentina Islamova (RUS)	10
Yana Rattigan (GBR)	2
Eri Tosaka (JPN)	13

Quarterfinals
Valentina Islamova (RUS)	0
Eri Tosaka (JPN)	6

==== Section 4 ====
Round of 64
Rebecca Muambo (CMR)	0
Geneviève Morrison (CAN)	10
Nataliya Pulkovska (UKR)	6^{F}
Kamila Barbosa (BRA)	0
Alina Vuc (ROU)	0
Iwona Matkowska (POL)	7^{F}

Round of 32
Carolina Castillo (COL)	12
Silvia Felice (ITA)	0
Viyaleta Chyryk (BLR)	1
Patricia Bermúdez (ARG)	10
Vicmarie Requena (PUR)	0
Geneviève Morrison (CAN)	10
Nataliya Pulkovska (UKR)	7^{F}
Iwona Matkowska (POL)	3

Round of 16
Carolina Castillo (COL)	5
Patricia Bermúdez (ARG)	4
Geneviève Morrison (CAN)	2
Nataliya Pulkovska (UKR)	0

Quarterfinals
Carolina Castillo (COL)	4
Geneviève Morrison (CAN)	6

=== Repechage ===
Repechage round 2
Jessica Blaszka (NED)	10
Thalía Mallqui (PER)	0
Erdenesükhiin Narangerel (MGL)	9^{F}
Yana Rattigan (GBR)	8

Repechage round 3
Jessica Blaszka (NED)	7
Tatyana Amanzhol (KAZ)	5
Erdenesükhiin Narangerel (MGL)	0
Valentina Islamova (RUS)	10

Bronze medals
Jessica Blaszka (NED)	5
Li Hui (CHN)	5
Valentina Islamova (RUS)	2
Geneviève Morrison (CAN)	3
