= Vinesh Phogat =

Indian freestyle wrestler and politician (born 1994)

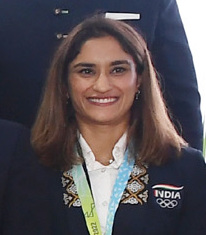
- Phogat in 2022

Personal information
- Born: 25 August 1994 (age 32) Charkhi Dadri district, Haryana, India
- Height: 1.68 m (5 ft 6 in)
- Spouse: Somvir Rathee (m. 2018)
- Relative: Phogat sisters

Member of Haryana Legislative Assembly
- Incumbent
- Assumed office 8 October 2024
- Preceded by: Amarjeet Dhanda
- Constituency: Julana

Personal details
- Party: Indian National Congress

Sport
- Sport: Wrestling
- Event: Freestyle

Achievements and titles
- Highest world ranking: 1
Medal record
Women's freestyle wrestling
Representing India
Event	1st	2nd	3rd
World Championships	0	0	2
Asian Games	1	0	1
Asian Championships	1	3	4
Commonwealth Games	3	0	0
Commonwealth Championships	1	1	0
Grand Prix	4	1	0
Total	10	5	7
World Championships
Bronze medal – third place	2019 Nur-Sultan	53 kg
Bronze medal – third place	2022 Belgrade	53 kg
Asian Games
Gold medal – first place	2018 Jakarta	50 kg
Bronze medal – third place	2014 Incheon	48 kg
Asian Championships
Gold medal – first place	2021 Almaty	53 kg
Silver medal – second place	2015 Doha	48 kg
Silver medal – second place	2017 New Delhi	55 kg
Silver medal – second place	2018 Bishkek	50 kg
Bronze medal – third place	2013 New Delhi	51 kg
Bronze medal – third place	2016 Bangkok	53 kg
Bronze medal – third place	2019 Xi'an	53 kg
Bronze medal – third place	2020 New Delhi	53 kg
Commonwealth Games
Gold medal – first place	2014 Glasgow	48 kg
Gold medal – first place	2018 Gold Coast	50 kg
Gold medal – first place	2022 Birmingham	53 kg
Commonwealth Championships
Gold medal – first place	2017 Johannesburg	55kg
Silver medal – second place	2013 Johannesburg	51kg
Grand Prix
Gold medal – first place	2019 Istanbul	53 kg
Gold medal – first place	2020 Rome	53 kg
Gold medal – first place	2021 Rome	53 kg
Gold medal – first place	2021 Warsaw	53 kg
Silver medal – second place	2019 Ruse	53 kg

Vinesh Phogat (pronounced [ʋɪˈneːʃ ˈpʰoːɡɑːʈ]; born 25 August 1994) is an Indian freestyle wrestler and politician from Haryana. She currently serves as a member of the Haryana Legislative Assembly for Julana constituency, representing the Indian National Congress.

Phogat hails from a family of wrestlers with her sister Priyanka Phogat and several of her cousins also competing in wrestling events. She is trained by her uncle Mahavir Singh Phogat. She is employed by the Indian Railways. In 2018, she married fellow wrestler Somvir Rathee.

Phogat is a two-time World Championships bronze medalist. She has won a gold and a bronze medal at the Asian Games, and eight medals including a gold, three silver, and four bronze in the Asian Championships. She is also a three-time Commonwealth Games gold medalist, and is the only Indian woman wrestler to have won gold at both the Asian and Commonwealth Games. She represented India at the 2016, 2020, and 2024 Summer Olympics. At the 2024 Summer Olympics, she reached the final of 50 kg event, before being disqualified for being above the stipulated weight.

Phogat was part of the 2023 Indian wrestlers' protest against the Wrestling Federation of India and its president Brijbhushan Sharan Singh. She also joined the 2024 Indian farmers' protest demanding a minimum price guarantee for their agricultural produce. She joined the Congress party on 6 September 2024 before contesting in the 2024 Haryana Legislative Assembly election held on 5 October.

== Early and personal life ==
Vinesh Phogat was born on 25 August 1994 in Charkhi Dadri district, Haryana, India. She is the daughter of Rajpal Phogat and Premlata Phogat and hails from a family of wrestlers. Her sister Priyanka Phogat and cousins Geeta Phogat, Ritu Phogat and Babita Kumari also compete in wrestling events. She is trained by her uncle Mahavir Singh Phogat.

During her early years, Phogat's father and uncle faced opposition from members of their village for supporting her and her cousins in pursuing competitive wrestling, as they were seen as going against the traditional morals and values of their community. When she was nine years old, her father was shot dead in front of their house by a relative due to a domestic dispute.

On 13 December 2018, Phogat married fellow wrestler Somvir Rathee from Jind. Both of them worked for the Indian Railways and have known each other since 2011.

== Sports career ==
=== Early career (2013–2016) ===
Phogat won her first international medal in the women's freestyle 51 kg category at the 2013 Asian Wrestling Championships in New Delhi. She defeated Nanami Irie of Japan in the initial bout before losing to Tatyana Amanzhol of Kazakhstan in the quarterfinals. In the repechage rounds, she beat Tho-Kaew Sriprapa of Thailand to win the bronze medal. In the 2013 Commonwealth Wrestling Championships held in Johannesburg, she won the silver medal in the 51 kg category after she lost to Odunayo Adekuoroye of Nigeria in the final. In her first Commonwealth Games appearance in 2014 at Glasgow, she competed in the 48 kg category. She defeated Rosemary Nweke of Nigeria in the quarterfinals and Jasmine Mian of Canada in the semi-finals. In the gold medal bout, she defeated Yana Rattigan of England by a score of 3-1 and won her first gold medal at the Games.

Phogat won a bronze medal in the 48 kg category at the 2014 Asian Games held in Incheon, South Korea. She defeated Pak Yongmi of North Korea in the first round before she overcame Dauletbike Yakhshimuratova of Uzbekistan in the quarterfinals. She lost to Eri Tosaka of Japan in the semi-finals by a scoreline of 1–3 and later won the bronze medal after beating Narangerel Eredenesukh of Mongolia by technical superiority in the repechage bout. She won the silver medal in the 2015 Asian Championships held at Doha after losing to Yuki Irie of Japan in the finals.

=== Injury and comeback (2016–2020) ===
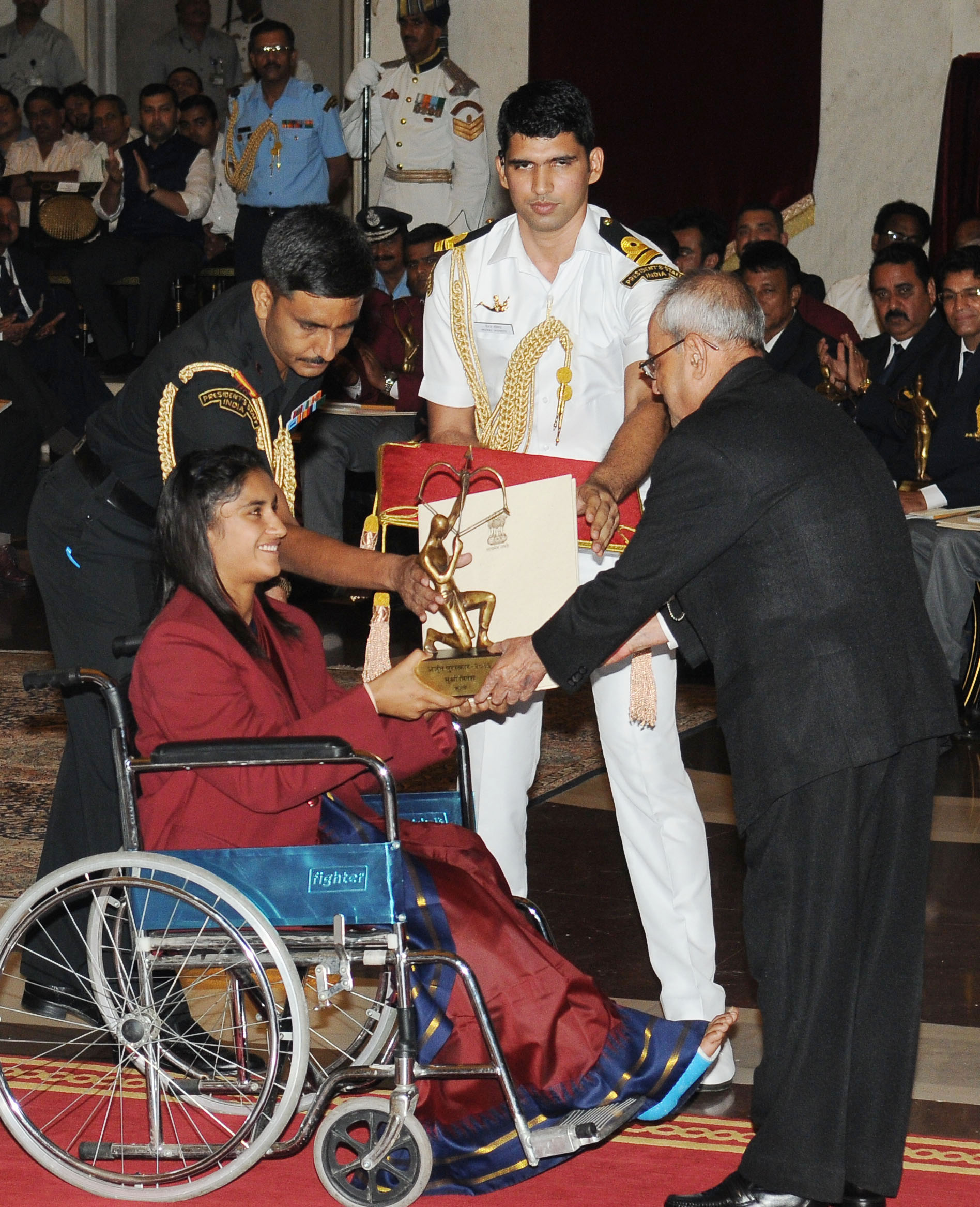
Phogat receives the Arjuna Award from President Pranab Mukherjee in 2016

In April 2016, Phogat was slated to compete at the 2016 World Wrestling Olympic Qualification Tournament 1 at Ulaanbaatar in a bid to qualify for the 2016 Summer Olympics. However, she was disqualified from the competition after she was found to be 100 g (3.5 oz) above the stipulated weight and was let off with a warning. Subsequently, Phogat qualified for the 2016 Summer Olympics at the 2016 World Wrestling Olympic Qualification Tournament 2 held in Istanbul, after she beat Polish wrestler Iwona Matkowska in the final. She competed in the 48 kg category at her first Olympics in 2016 at Rio de Janeiro. At the Olympics, she won the round of 16 bout against Alina Vuc of Romania by technical superiority. During the quarterfinal bout against Sun Yanan of China, she retired midway through the match after she suffered an anterior cruciate ligament injury during the match.

Phogat returned to international competition at the 2018 Commonwealth Games in Gold Coast. In the 50 kg category, which was held in round-robin format, she won all her matches to secure her second gold medal at the Commonwealth Games. At the 2018 Asian Games at Jakarta, she competed in the 50 kg category. She defeated Sun Yanan of China in the round of 16 before beating Kim Hyung-joo of South Korea in the quarterfinals and Dauletbike Yakhshimuratova of Uzbekistan in the semifinals. In the finals, she defeated Japan's Yuki Irie to win the gold medal and thus became the first Indian woman wrestler to win a gold at both the Commonwealth and Asian Games.

In the 2019 Asian Wrestling Championships, Phogat won a bronze medal in the 53 kg category after defeating Qianyu Pang of China. In the 2019 Yasar Dogu Tournament, she won the gold medal after defeating Ekaterina Poleshchuk of Russia in the final. In the 2019 World Wrestling Championships, she won the bronze medal in the 53 kg category after she defeated Maria Prevolaraki in the bronze medal match. She also became the first Indian wrestler to qualify for the wrestling events at the 2020 Summer Olympics by virtue of her top six finish in the tournament. In January 2020, she won the gold medal in the Rome Ranking Series event after she defeated Luisa Valverde in the finals.

=== Later career and retirement (2021–2024) ===
Phogat defeated the 2017 world Champion Vanesa Kaladzinskaya of Belarus to win the gold medal at the Outstanding Ukrainian Wrestlers and Coaches Memorial tournament held in Kyiv in February 2021. In March 2021, she won the gold medal at the 2021 Matteo Pellicone Ranking Series event to become the world number one in the 53 kg weight category. In June 2021, she won the gold medal in the 53 kg category in the Poland Open wrestling tournament in Warsaw after defeating Ukraine's Khrystyna Bereza in the final.

In August 2021, Phogat was seeded first in the women's 53 kg event at the 2020 Summer Olympics. Though she defeated Sofia Mattsson of Sweden in the first round, she was beaten by Vanesa Kaladzinskaya of Belarus in the quarterfinals. After the Olympics, she was suspended by the Wrestling Federation of India (WFI) for indiscipline, on charges that she had refused to train with her Indian teammates in the Olympic Village and had not worn the official Indian kit during the Games. She later apologised to the WFI for the incident. As a consequence, in November 2021, the WFI barred private organisations from signing contracts with or training wrestlers without its approval, resulting in Phogat losing her private contract with JSW Sports.

In the women's 53 kg event at the 2022 Commonwealth Games in Birmingham, Phogat won her third consecutive gold medal at the Commonwealth Games. In the 53 kg event at the 2022 World Wrestling Championships in Belgrade, she won her second World Championship bronze medal. She lost her first round bout against Batkhuyagiin Khulan of Mongolia, but won three straight games in the repechage rounds to win the bronze. As Antim Panghal had secured the quota in the 53 kg weight class for the 2024 Summer Olympics, Phogat competed in the lower 50 kg weight class at the 2024 Asian Wrestling Olympic Qualification Tournament in Bishkek, and earned an Olympic quota place.

In the opening round of the women's 50 kg event at the 2024 Summer Olympics at Paris, she defeated Japan's reigning Olympic and world champion Yui Susaki, who had never previously lost an international bout and had won the gold medal at the 2020 Summer Olympics without conceding a single point to an opponent. The match was a cagey affair with Susaki leading 2–0 through two penalty points until the final few seconds when the Indian effected a takedown and scored an upset win. She beat Oksana Livach of Ukraine in the quarterfinals and Yusneylys Guzmán of Cuba in the semifinals by point decisions to qualify for the final. However, she was later disqualified after exceeding the stipulated weight limit during the weigh-in on the morning of the final, and was relegated to last place in the classification. The following day, she announced her immediate retirement from the sport. India filed an appeal with the Court of Arbitration for Sport requesting that Phogat be awarded a joint silver medal, but the appeal was dismissed on 15 August.

=== Comeback (2025–present) ===
In December 2025, Phogat announced her return to competitive wrestling with the goal of qualifying for the 2028 Summer Olympics, nearly 18 months after retiring from the sport. In announcing her comeback, she said that her time away from wrestling had helped her rediscover her passion for the sport.

== Socio-political activism ==
=== 2023 protests against Wrestling Federation of India ===
In January 2023, Phogat, along with more than 30 Indian wrestlers, including Sakshi Malik, Bajrang Punia, and Anshu Malik, organised a protest demanding the dissolution of the WFI and action against its president, Brijbhushan Sharan Singh, following allegations that coaches associated with the federation had sexually harassed female wrestlers for years. The wrestlers dropped their protests after the Government of India agreed to form an oversight committee to look into the claims. In April 2023, the wrestlers resumed their protests, claiming that the government had failed to honour its commitments. During the protests, Phogat said that she had informed Indian Prime Minister Narendra Modi and Sports Minister Anurag Thakur about alleged mental harassment, torture, and threats to her life following her complaint and accusations against Bhushan.

After a month of protest, the Sports Ministry instructed the Indian Olympic Association (IOA) in May to suspend the WFI and to set up an ad-hoc panel to oversee the functions of Indian wrestling. The panel was also tasked with holding fresh elections for the appointment of a new WFI chief within 45 days. On 28 May 2023, Phogat and the other protesting wrestlers were detained by the Delhi Police when they tried to march towards the Parliament of India demanding the arrest of Brijbhushan Singh. In August 2023, United World Wrestling suspended WFI's membership due to its failure to organise elections for the post of WFI chief, which restricted India's ability to field wrestlers under the Indian flag in international wrestling events.

The election for the WFI president and 14 other posts was held on 21 December 2023. Sanjay Singh, an aide of Brijbhushan Singh, was elected president, while candidates associated with Brijbhushan Singh won 13 of the 15 posts. After Phogat and the wrestlers expressed their outrage on the election results, The Sports Ministry suspended the newly elected WFI body led by Sanjay Singh on 24 December 2023, citing its disregard for established policies and procedures. However, in March 2024, the IOA restored Sanjay Singh, allowing him to assume full charge of the WFI. The decision was challenged in the Delhi High Court by Phogat and the other protesting wrestlers, and on 16 August, the court asked the IOA to put its ad-hoc committee back in charge of the WFI until the central government lifted the suspension on it.

=== 2024 farmers' protests ===
On 31 August 2024, Phogat joined the ongoing farmers' protest at Shambhu border along Punjab's border with Haryana, which had entered its 200th day, in support of a legal guarantee for a minimum support price for all crops. In her speech at the protest, she expressed her admiration for the protesting farmers, saying that she was proud to have been born into a farming family. She commended the farmers' determination to continue their agitation for such a long time, saying that it had inspired others like her to continue fighting for their causes. She also urged the government to address the farmers' issues as a priority.

== Political career ==
Upon her return to India after the 2024 Summer Olympics, Indian National Congress leader Deepender Singh Hooda, who was the Member of Parliament for Rohtak, organised a roadshow for Phogat from the Indira Gandhi International Airport in New Delhi to her village in Haryana. Subsequently, Phogat was felicitated by the local Khap panchayat, during which her supporters urged her to enter politics. On 4 September 2024, she and fellow wrestler Bajrang Punia met with Congress president Mallikarjun Kharge and Rahul Gandhi, after which she officially joined the party on 6 September.

The Congress fielded Phogat as its candidate for the Julana Assembly constituency for the 2024 Haryana Legislative Assembly election. According to Indian Express, the move was aimed at appealing to the Jat community, which had been at the forefront of the farmers' agitation against the Bharatiya Janata Party (BJP)-led government over demands for a price guarantee. Phogat's entry into politics, as a Jat herself, was seen as an attempt to consolidate Jat support. However, the move did not produce the anticipated political gains, as the BJP retained power in the state. However, Vinesh won the elections after defeating the BJP candidate Yogesh Kumar by a margin of about 6,015 votes, and was elected to the Haryana Legislative Assembly.

=== Electoral performance ===
2024 Haryana Legislative Assembly election: Julana
Party	Candidate	Votes	%	±%
INC	Vinesh Phogat	65,080	46.86%	▲37.02
BJP	Yogesh Kumar	59,065	42.53%	▲12.66
INLD	Surender Lather	10,158	7.31%	New
JJP	Amarjeet Dhanda	2,477	1.78%	▼47.23
AAP	Kavita Rani	1,280	0.92%	▲0.16
NOTA	None of the Above	202	0.15%	New
Margin of victory		6,015	4.33%	▼14.81
Turnout		1,38,871	75.20%	▲2.42
Registered electors		1,85,565		▲6.35
INC gain from JJP		Swing	▼2.15	

== Statistics ==
=== Record against select opponents ===
Weight	Opponent	Matches	Won	Lost	Net
53 kg	(North Korea) Pak Yong-mi	3	3	0	+3
53 kg	(Japan) Mayu Mukaida	3	0	3	–3
53 kg	(China) Pang Qianyu	4	2	2	0
53 kg	(China) Lannuan Luo	1	1	0	+1
55 kg	(China) Zhang Qi	1	1	0	+1
53 kg	(Greece) Maria Prevolaraki	1	1	0	+1
53 kg	(Sweden) Sofia Mattsson	1	1	0	+1
53 kg	(Germany) Nina Hemmer	1	1	0	+1
53 kg	(Ukraine) Iryna Husyak	1	1	0	+1
53 kg	(Ukraine) Yuliya Khalvadzhy	1	1	0	+1
53 kg	(Uzbekistan) Aktenge Keunimjaeva	1	1	0	+1
53 kg	(Kazakhstan) Tatyana Amanzhol	2	1	1	0
53 kg	(United States) Sarah Hildebrandt	2	2	0	+2
53 kg	(Belarus) Vanesa Kaladzinskaya	2	1	1	0
53 kg	(Kazakhstan) Zhuldyz Eshimova	1	1	1	0
53 kg	(Netherlands) Jessica Blaszka	1	1	0	+1
53 kg	(Ecuador) Luisa Valverde	1	1	0	+1
53 kg	(Chinese Taipei) Jo Cin Chiu	1	1	0	+1
53 kg	(Russia) Natalia Malysheva	2	1	1	0
53 kg	(United States) Amy Fearnside	2	0	0	+2
53 kg	(Russia) Ekaterina Poleshchuk	2	2	0	+2

Weight	Opponent	Matches	Won	Lost	Net
48 kg	(Japan) Yuki Irie	3	2	1	+1
48 kg	(Japan) Eri Tosaka	2	0	2	–2
48 kg	(Japan) Nanami Irie	3	1	2	–1
48 kg	(Mongolia) Erdenesukh Narangerel	2	1	1	0
48 kg	(Uzbekistan) Dauletbike Yakhshimuratova	4	4	0	+4
48 kg	(Mongolia) Byambazaya Tsogtbaatar	2	2	0	+2
48 kg	(South Korea) Lee yo-mi	2	1	1	0
48 kg	(South Korea) Kim Hyung-joo	2	2	0	+2
48 kg	(Poland) Iwona Matkowska	1	1	0	+1
48 kg	(Turkey) Evin Demirhan	1	1	0	+1
48 kg	(Ukraine) Oksana Livach	1	1	0	+1
48 kg	(Romania) Alina Vuc	1	1	0	+1
48 kg	(Ukraine) Nataliya Pulkovska	1	1	0	+1
48 kg	(United States) Victoria Anthony	1	0	1	-1
48 kg	(China) Chun Lei	1	0	1	-1
48 kg	(North Korea) Kim Hyon-gyong	1	0	1	-1

=== Select results ===
Legend

- W – Win; L – Loss;
- F – Victory by fall
- R - Retired

==== Summer Olympics ====
Year	Venue	Event	Opponent	Score	Round	Rank
2016	Rio de Janeiro	48 kg	Sun Yanan (CHN)	L 1^{R}-2	Quarterfinal	10
2020	Tokyo	53 kg	Vanesa Kaladzinskaya (BLR)	L 3–9^{F}	Quarterfinal	9
2024	Paris	50 kg	Sarah Hildebrandt (USA)	DQ	Final	LFO

==== World Championships ====
Year	Venue	Event	Opponent	Score	Round	Rank
2013	Budapest	51 kg	Isabelle Sambou (SEN)	L 3–6	Round of 16	10
2015	Las Vegas	48 kg	Kim Hyon-gyong (PRK)	L 4–8	Round of 32	22
2017	Paris	48 kg	Victoria Anthony (USA)	L 4-6^{F}	Round of 16	10
2019	Nur-Sultan	53 kg	Maria Prevolaraki (GRE)	W 4–1	Repechage	3rd place, bronze medalist(s)
2022	Belgrade	53 kg	Jonna Malmgren (SWE)	W 8–0	Repechage	3rd place, bronze medalist(s)

==== Asian Games ====
Year	Venue	Event	Opponent	Score	Round	Rank
2014	Incheon	48 kg	Eri Tosaka (JPN)	L 4–6	Repechage	3rd place, bronze medalist(s)
2018	Jakarta	50 kg	Yuki Irie (JPN)	W 6–2	Final	1st place, gold medalist(s)

==== Asian Championships ====
Year	Venue	Event	Opponent	Result	Round	Rank
2014	New Delhi	51 kg	Tho-Kaew Sriprapa (THA)	W 4–2	Repechage	3rd place, bronze medalist(s)
2015	Doha	48 kg	Yuki Irie (JPN)	L 2–3	Final	2nd place, silver medalist(s)
2016	Bangkok	53 kg	Pak Yong-mi (PRK)	W 9^{F}-4	Repechage	3rd place, bronze medalist(s)
2017	New Delhi	55 kg	Sae Nanjo (JPN)	L 4–8	Final	2nd place, silver medalist(s)
2018	Bishkek	50 kg	Lei Chun (CHN)	L 2–3	Final	2nd place, silver medalist(s)
2019	Xi'an	53 kg	Pang Qianyu (CHN)	W 8–1	Repechage	3rd place, bronze medalist(s)
2020	New Delhi	53 kg	Kiều Thị Ly (VIE)	W 10–0	Repechage	3rd place, bronze medalist(s)
2021	Almaty	53 kg	Meng Hsuan (TPE)	W 6^{F}-0	Finals	1st place, gold medalist(s)

==== Commonwealth Games ====
Year	Venue	Event	Opponent	Score	Round	Rank
2014	Glasgow	48 kg	Yana Rattigan (ENG)	W 11–8	Final	1st place, gold medalist(s)
2018	Gold Coast	50 kg	Jessica MacDonald (CAN)	W 13–3	Round-robin	1st place, gold medalist(s)
2022	Birmingham	53 kg	Samantha Stewart (CAN)	W 2–0	Round-robin	1st place, gold medalist(s)

== Awards and honours ==
Phogat was awarded the Arjuna Award by the Government of India in 2016. In 2018, the Sports Authority of India nominated her for the Padma Shri, India's fourth highest civilian honour. In 2020, the government awarded her the Major Dhyan Chand Khel Ratna, India's highest sporting honour.

Phogat was nominated for the Laureus World Sports Award for Comeback of the Year at the Laureus World Sports Awards in 2019 and was the first Indian to get a nomination for the award. She was nominated for the BBC Indian Sportswoman of The Year award for 2022 and 2024. She was also included on the BBC's 100 Women list for 2024.
