= Wrestling at the 2014 Asian Games – Women's freestyle 48 kg =

Women's freestyle 48 kg at the 2014 Asian Games
- Venue: Dowon Gymnasium
- Date: 27 September 2014
- Competitors: 13 from 13 nations

Medalists
| gold medal | Eri Tosaka | Japan |
| silver medal | Sun Yanan | China |
| bronze medal | Tatyana Amanzhol | Kazakhstan |
| bronze medal | Vinesh Phogat | India |

The women's freestyle 48 kilograms wrestling competition at the 2014 Asian Games in Incheon was held on 27 September 2014 at the Dowon Gymnasium.

== Schedule ==
All times are Korea Standard Time (UTC+09:00)

| Date | Time | Event |
|---|---|---|
| Saturday, 27 September 2014 | 13:00 | 1/8 finals |
| Saturday, 27 September 2014 | 13:00 | Quarterfinals |
| Saturday, 27 September 2014 | 13:00 | Semifinals |
| Saturday, 27 September 2014 | 13:00 | Repechages |
| Saturday, 27 September 2014 | 19:00 | Finals |

== Results ==
Legend

- F — Won by fall

=== Main bracket ===
1/8 finals
Sun Yanan (CHN) | 8
Tatyana Amanzhol (KAZ) | 3
Dauletbike Yakhshimuratova (UZB) | 11^{F}
Kyu Kyu Thein (MYA) | 0
Vinesh Phogat (IND) | 4
Pak Yong-mi (PRK) | 3
Nguyễn Thị Lụa (VIE) | 1
Erdenesükhiin Narangerel (MGL) | 3
Eri Tosaka (JPN) | 6
Lee Yu-mi (KOR) | 2

Quarterfinals
Maliwan Muangpor (THA) | 12
Chov Sotheara (CAM) | 5
Margarita Filippowa (TKM) | 2
Sun Yanan (CHN) | 12
Dauletbike Yakhshimuratova (UZB) | 0
Vinesh Phogat (IND) | 10^{F}
Erdenesükhiin Narangerel (MGL) | 0
Eri Tosaka (JPN) | 10

Semifinals
Maliwan Muangpor (THA) | 0
Sun Yanan (CHN) | 10
Vinesh Phogat (IND) | 4
Eri Tosaka (JPN) | 6

Gold medal
Sun Yanan (CHN) | 1
Eri Tosaka (JPN) | 5

=== Repechage ===
Repechage
Tatyana Amanzhol (KAZ) | 10
Margarita Filippowa (TKM) | 0
Lee Yu-mi (KOR) | 5
Erdenesükhiin Narangerel (MGL) | 6

Bronze medals
Tatyana Amanzhol (KAZ) | 10
Maliwan Muangpor (THA) | 0
Erdenesükhiin Narangerel (MGL) | 0
Vinesh Phogat (IND) | 10

== Final standing ==
| Rank | Athlete |
|---|---|
| 1st place, gold medalist(s) | Eri Tosaka (JPN) |
| 2nd place, silver medalist(s) | Sun Yanan (CHN) |
| 3rd place, bronze medalist(s) | Tatyana Amanzhol (KAZ) |
| 3rd place, bronze medalist(s) | Vinesh Phogat (IND) |
| 5 | Maliwan Muangpor (THA) |
| 5 | Erdenesükhiin Narangerel (MGL) |
| 7 | Dauletbike Yakhshimuratova (UZB) |
| 8 | Lee Yu-mi (KOR) |
| 9 | Chov Sotheara (CAM) |
| 10 | Pak Yong-mi (PRK) |
| 11 | Margarita Filippowa (TKM) |
| 12 | Nguyễn Thị Lụa (VIE) |
| 13 | Kyu Kyu Thein (MYA) |
