= 2014 World Wrestling Championships – Women's freestyle 48 kg =

Women's freestyle 48 kg at the 2014 World Championships
- Venue: Gymnastics Sport Palace
- Dates: 10 September 2014
- Competitors: 32 from 32 nations

Medalists
gold medal	Eri Tosaka	Japan
silver medal	Iwona Matkowska	Poland
bronze medal	Mariya Stadnik	Azerbaijan
bronze medal	Kim Hyon-gyong	North Korea

The Women's freestyle 48 kilograms is a competition featured at the 2014 World Wrestling Championships, and was held in Tashkent, Uzbekistan on 10 September 2014.

This freestyle wrestling competition consisted of a single-elimination tournament, with a repechage used to determine the winners of two bronze medals.

== Results ==
Legend

- F — Won by fall

=== Final ===
Final
Iwona Matkowska (POL)	2
Eri Tosaka (JPN)	10

=== Top half ===
Round of 32
Yana Rattigan (GBR)	0
Mariya Stadnik (AZE)	11
Lei Chun (CHN)	4^{F}
Jennifer González (GUA)	0
Jasmine Mian (CAN)	2
Patricia Bermúdez (ARG)	12
Mayelis Caripá (VEN)	0
Angélica Bustos (ECU)	10
Jaqueline Schellin (GER)	0
Iwona Matkowska (POL)	10
Priyanka Singh (IND)	0
Alina Vuc (ROU)	10
Mariana Díaz (MEX)	6
Fredrika Petersson (SWE)	4
Carolina Castillo (COL)	6
Dauletbike Yakhshimuratova (UZB)	1

Round of 16
Mariya Stadnik (AZE)	7
Lei Chun (CHN)	0
Patricia Bermúdez (ARG)	10
Angélica Bustos (ECU)	6
Iwona Matkowska (POL)	6
Alina Vuc (ROU)	1
Mariana Díaz (MEX)	4
Carolina Castillo (COL)	4

Quarterfinals
Mariya Stadnik (AZE)	10
Patricia Bermúdez (ARG)	0
Iwona Matkowska (POL)	10
Mariana Díaz (MEX)	0

Semifinals
Mariya Stadnik (AZE)	3
Iwona Matkowska (POL)	5

=== Bottom half ===
Round of 32
Evin Demirhan (TUR)	12
Rebecca Muambo (CMR)	4
Zulfiya Yakhyarova (KAZ)	0
Kim Hyon-gyong (PRK)	10
Iulia Leorda (MDA)	9
Alina Moreva (RUS)	8
Jessica Blaszka (NED)	8^{F}
Tanoh Benie (CIV)	0
Silvia Felice (ITA)	0
Eri Tosaka (JPN)	10
Vanesa Kaladzinskaya (BLR)	1
Nataliya Pulkovska (UKR)	10
Erdenesükhiin Narangerel (MGL)	6
Alyssa Lampe (USA)	10^{F}
Oh Hyun-young (KOR)	4
Mélanie Lesaffre (FRA)	2

Round of 16
Evin Demirhan (TUR)	0
Kim Hyon-gyong (PRK)	10
Iulia Leorda (MDA)	15
Jessica Blaszka (NED)	4
Eri Tosaka (JPN)	11
Nataliya Pulkovska (UKR)	0
Alyssa Lampe (USA)	13^{F}
Oh Hyun-young (KOR)	8

Quarterfinals
Kim Hyon-gyong (PRK)	10
Iulia Leorda (MDA)	0
Eri Tosaka (JPN)	14
Alyssa Lampe (USA)	4

Semifinals
Kim Hyon-gyong (PRK)	0
Eri Tosaka (JPN)	4

=== Repechage ===
Repechage round 1
Jaqueline Schellin (GER)	4
Alina Vuc (ROU)	8
Silvia Felice (ITA)	8^{F}
Nataliya Pulkovska (UKR)	5

Repechage round 2
Alina Vuc (ROU)	10
Mariana Díaz (MEX)	0
Silvia Felice (ITA)	3
Alyssa Lampe (USA)	6^{F}

Bronze medals
Alina Vuc (ROU)	0
Mariya Stadnik (AZE)	11
Alyssa Lampe (USA)	4
Kim Hyon-gyong (PRK)	4
