= Wrestling at the 2010 Asian Games – Women's freestyle 48 kg =

Women's freestyle 48 kg at the 2010 Asian Games
- Venue: Huagong Gymnasium
- Date: 25 November 2010
- Competitors: 12 from 12 nations

Medalists
gold medal	So Sim-hyang	North Korea
silver medal	Nguyễn Thị Lụa	Vietnam
bronze medal	Hitomi Sakamoto	Japan
bronze medal	Kim Hyung-joo	South Korea

The women's freestyle 48 kilograms wrestling competition at the 2010 Asian Games in Guangzhou was held on 25 November 2010 at the Huagong Gymnasium.

This freestyle wrestling competition consisted of a single-elimination tournament, with a repechage used to determine the winner of two bronze medals. The two finalists faced off for gold and silver medals. Each wrestler who lost to one of the two finalists moved into the repechage, culminating in a pair of bronze medal matches featuring the semifinal losers each facing the remaining repechage opponent from their half of the bracket.

Each bout consisted of up to three rounds, lasting two minutes apiece. The wrestler who scored more points in each round was the winner of that rounds; the bout finished when one wrestler had won two rounds (and thus the match).

== Schedule ==
All times are China Standard Time (UTC+08:00)

Date	Time	Event
Thursday, 25 November 2010	09:30	1/8 finals
Thursday, 25 November 2010	09:30	Quarterfinals
Thursday, 25 November 2010	09:30	Semifinals
Thursday, 25 November 2010	16:00	Repechages
Thursday, 25 November 2010	17:00	Finals

== Results ==
Legend

- F — Won by fall

=== Main bracket ===
1/8 finals
Zhuldyz Eshimova (KAZ)	1	0	1
Nirmala Devi (IND)	0	4	0
Tsogtbazaryn Enkhjargal (MGL)	0	1	3
Kim Hyung-joo (KOR)	1	0	4
Chov Sotheara (CAM)	1	3
Maribel Jambora (PHI)	0	0
Nguyễn Thị Lụa (VIE)	3	6
Sriprapa Thokaew (THA)	1	0

Quarterfinals
Hitomi Sakamoto (JPN)	7^{F}
Zhao Shasha (CHN)	3
So Sim-hyang (PRK)	1	3
Mikhrniso Nurmatova (KGZ)	0	2
Zhuldyz Eshimova (KAZ)	1	0	2
Kim Hyung-joo (KOR)	0	1	3
Chov Sotheara (CAM)	0	0
Nguyễn Thị Lụa (VIE)	4	4^{F}

Semifinals
Hitomi Sakamoto (JPN)	0	2
So Sim-hyang (PRK)	1	5
Kim Hyung-joo (KOR)	5	0
Nguyễn Thị Lụa (VIE)	1	4^{F}

Final
So Sim-hyang (PRK)	4^{F}
Nguyễn Thị Lụa (VIE)	3

=== Repechage ===
Repechage round 1
Sriprapa Thokaew (THA)	0	1
Chov Sotheara (CAM)	6	2

Bronze medals
Mikhrniso Nurmatova (KGZ)	0
Hitomi Sakamoto (JPN)	4^{F}
Chov Sotheara (CAM)	0	0
Kim Hyung-joo (KOR)	2	3

== Final standing ==
Rank	Athlete
1st place, gold medalist(s)	So Sim-hyang (PRK)
2nd place, silver medalist(s)	Nguyễn Thị Lụa (VIE)
3rd place, bronze medalist(s)	Hitomi Sakamoto (JPN)
3rd place, bronze medalist(s)	Kim Hyung-joo (KOR)
5	Mikhrniso Nurmatova (KGZ)
5	Chov Sotheara (CAM)
7	Zhuldyz Eshimova (KAZ)
8	Sriprapa Thokaew (THA)
9	Nirmala Devi (IND)
10	Tsogtbazaryn Enkhjargal (MGL)
11	Zhao Shasha (CHN)
12	Maribel Jambora (PHI)
