= 2015 Asian Wrestling Championships =

- Host city: Doha, Qatar
- Dates: 6–10 May 2015
- Stadium: Aspire Dome

Champions
- Freestyle: Iran
- Greco-Roman: Iran
- Women: Japan

The 2015 Asian Wrestling Championships was held at the Aspire Dome Volleyball Hall in Doha, Qatar. The event took place from 6 to 10 May 2015.

== Medal table ==
Rank	Nation	Gold	Silver	Bronze	Total
1	Iran	7	3	3	13
2	Japan	4	5	9	18
3	China	4	3	5	12
4	Uzbekistan	3	0	6	9
5	Kazakhstan	2	2	8	12
6	South Korea	2	0	2	4
7	Kyrgyzstan	1	6	1	8
8	Mongolia	1	1	5	7
9	North Korea	0	3	1	4
10	India	0	1	4	5
11	Tajikistan	0	0	2	2
12	Chinese Taipei	0	0	1	1
Totals (12 entries)		24	24	47	95

== Team ranking ==
Rank	Men's freestyle		Men's Greco-Roman		Women's freestyle	
Rank	Team	Points	Team	Points	Team	Points
1	Iran	69	Iran	63	Japan	74
2	Japan	60	Kazakhstan	58	China	64
3	Kyrgyzstan	55	China	57	Kazakhstan	61
4	Mongolia	47	Uzbekistan	54	India	53
5	Uzbekistan	41	South Korea	48	Mongolia	46
6	Kazakhstan	35	Kyrgyzstan	45	North Korea	34
7	India	32	Japan	39	South Korea	29
8	China	24	India	21	Kyrgyzstan	13
9	South Korea	20	North Korea	15	Vietnam	13
10	Iraq	20	Tajikistan	14	Chinese Taipei	11

== Medal summary ==
=== Men's freestyle ===
Event	Gold	Silver	Bronze
57 kg	Erdenebatyn Bekhbayar; Mongolia	Samat Nadyrbek Uulu; Kyrgyzstan	Younes Sarmasti; Iran
57 kg	Erdenebatyn Bekhbayar; Mongolia	Samat Nadyrbek Uulu; Kyrgyzstan	Fumitaka Morishita; Japan
61 kg	Daulet Niyazbekov; Kazakhstan	Behnam Ehsanpour; Iran	Masakazu Kamoi; Japan
61 kg	Daulet Niyazbekov; Kazakhstan	Behnam Ehsanpour; Iran	Batboldyn Nomin; Mongolia
65 kg	Masoud Esmaeilpour; Iran	Tomotsugu Ishida; Japan	Ruslan Pliev; Uzbekistan
65 kg	Masoud Esmaeilpour; Iran	Tomotsugu Ishida; Japan	Ganzorigiin Mandakhnaran; Mongolia
70 kg	Bekzod Abdurakhmonov; Uzbekistan	Elaman Dogdurbek Uulu; Kyrgyzstan	Takafumi Kojima; Japan
70 kg	Bekzod Abdurakhmonov; Uzbekistan	Elaman Dogdurbek Uulu; Kyrgyzstan	Gantulgyn Iderkhüü; Mongolia
74 kg	Peyman Yarahmadi; Iran	Daisuke Shimada; Japan	Narsingh Yadav; India
74 kg	Peyman Yarahmadi; Iran	Daisuke Shimada; Japan	Rashid Kurbanov; Uzbekistan
86 kg	Alireza Karimi; Iran	Atsushi Matsumoto; Japan	Umidjon Ismanov; Uzbekistan
86 kg	Alireza Karimi; Iran	Atsushi Matsumoto; Japan	Pürveegiin Ösökhbaatar; Mongolia
97 kg	Mohammad Hossein Mohammadian; Iran	Magomed Musaev; Kyrgyzstan	Kim Jae-gang; South Korea
97 kg	Mohammad Hossein Mohammadian; Iran	Magomed Musaev; Kyrgyzstan	Takeshi Yamaguchi; Japan
125 kg	Aiaal Lazarev; Kyrgyzstan	Komeil Ghasemi; Iran	Deng Zhiwei; China
125 kg	Aiaal Lazarev; Kyrgyzstan	Komeil Ghasemi; Iran	Farkhod Anakulov; Tajikistan

=== Men's Greco-Roman ===
Event	Gold	Silver	Bronze
59 kg	Elmurat Tasmuradov; Uzbekistan	Yun Won-chol; North Korea	Shinobu Ota; Japan
59 kg	Elmurat Tasmuradov; Uzbekistan	Yun Won-chol; North Korea	Arsen Eraliev; Kyrgyzstan
66 kg	Ryu Han-su; South Korea	Mohammad Ali Geraei; Iran	Demeu Zhadrayev; Kazakhstan
66 kg	Ryu Han-su; South Korea	Mohammad Ali Geraei; Iran	Zheng Pan; China
71 kg	Ramin Taheri; Iran	Ruslan Tsarev; Kyrgyzstan	Nurbek Kholmukhammatov; Uzbekistan
71 kg	Ramin Taheri; Iran	Ruslan Tsarev; Kyrgyzstan	Zhang Ridong; China
75 kg	Kim Hyeon-woo; South Korea	Atabek Azisbekov; Kyrgyzstan	Dilshod Turdiev; Uzbekistan
75 kg	Kim Hyeon-woo; South Korea	Atabek Azisbekov; Kyrgyzstan	Payam Boveiri; Iran
80 kg	Yousef Ghaderian; Iran	Aishan Aisha; China	Jonibek Otabekov; Uzbekistan
80 kg	Yousef Ghaderian; Iran	Aishan Aisha; China	Zhassulan Koshanov; Kazakhstan
85 kg	Rustam Assakalov; Uzbekistan	Nursultan Tursynov; Kazakhstan	Taichi Oka; Japan
85 kg	Rustam Assakalov; Uzbekistan	Nursultan Tursynov; Kazakhstan	Park Jin-sung; South Korea
98 kg	Mehdi Aliyari; Iran	Xiao Di; China	Margulan Assembekov; Kazakhstan
98 kg	Mehdi Aliyari; Iran	Xiao Di; China	Norikatsu Saikawa; Japan
130 kg	Nurmakhan Tinaliyev; Kazakhstan	Meng Qiang; China	Murodjon Tuychiev; Tajikistan
130 kg	Nurmakhan Tinaliyev; Kazakhstan	Meng Qiang; China	Bashir Babajanzadeh; Iran

=== Women's freestyle ===
Event	Gold	Silver	Bronze
48 kg	Yuki Irie; Japan	Vinesh Phogat; India	Kim Hyon-gyong; North Korea
48 kg	Yuki Irie; Japan	Vinesh Phogat; India	Tatyana Amanzhol; Kazakhstan
53 kg	Zhong Xuechun; China	Pak Yong-mi; North Korea	Nanami Irie; Japan
53 kg	Zhong Xuechun; China	Pak Yong-mi; North Korea	Zhuldyz Eshimova; Kazakhstan
55 kg	Anri Kimura; Japan	Han Kum-ok; North Korea	Lalita Sehrawat; India
55 kg	Anri Kimura; Japan	Han Kum-ok; North Korea	Li Hui; China
58 kg	Kaori Icho; Japan	Aisuluu Tynybekova; Kyrgyzstan	Aiyim Abdildina; Kazakhstan
58 kg	Kaori Icho; Japan	Aisuluu Tynybekova; Kyrgyzstan	Geeta Phogat; India
60 kg	Luo Xiaojuan; China	Yoshimi Kayama; Japan	Sakshi Malik; India
60 kg	Luo Xiaojuan; China	Yoshimi Kayama; Japan	None awarded
63 kg	Xiluo Zhuoma; China	Kanako Murata; Japan	Yekaterina Larionova; Kazakhstan
63 kg	Xiluo Zhuoma; China	Kanako Murata; Japan	Enkhbayaryn Tsevegmid; Mongolia
69 kg	Zhou Feng; China	Elmira Syzdykova; Kazakhstan	Chen Wen-ling; Chinese Taipei
69 kg	Zhou Feng; China	Elmira Syzdykova; Kazakhstan	Kayoko Kudo; Japan
75 kg	Hiroe Suzuki; Japan	Badrakhyn Odonchimeg; Mongolia	Gulmaral Yerkebayeva; Kazakhstan
75 kg	Hiroe Suzuki; Japan	Badrakhyn Odonchimeg; Mongolia	Zhou Qian; China

== Participating nations ==
256 competitors from 25 nations competed.

- Afghanistan (1)
- Bahrain (1)
- China (24)
- Chinese Taipei (3)
- India (21)
- Iran (16)
- Iraq (12)
- Japan (24)
- Jordan (2)
- Kazakhstan (24)
- Kyrgyzstan (17)
- Mongolia (15)
- North Korea (10)
- Pakistan (6)
- Palestine (1)
- Qatar (5)
- Singapore (2)
- South Korea (22)
- Sri Lanka (3)
- Tajikistan (11)
- Thailand (1)
- Turkmenistan (8)
- United Arab Emirates (2)
- Uzbekistan (20)
- Vietnam (5)
