= Yuki Irie =

Japanese freestyle wrestler

Personal information
- Born: 17 September 1992 (age 33)

Sport
- Country: Japan
- Sport: Amateur wrestling
- Event: Freestyle
Medal record
Women's freestyle wrestling
Representing Japan
Asian Championships
Gold medal – first place	2015 Doha	48 kg
Gold medal – first place	2019 Xi'an	50 kg
Bronze medal – third place	2018 Bishkek	50 kg
Asian Games
Silver medal – second place	2018 Jakarta	50 kg
Golden Grand Prix Ivan Yarygin
Gold medal – first place	2018 Krasnoyarsk	50 kg

Yuki Irie (入江 ゆき, Irie Yuki; born 17 September 1992) is a Japanese freestyle wrestler. Her married name is Yuki Tanaka. In 2018, she won the silver medal in the women's 50 kg event at the 2018 Asian Games held in Jakarta, Indonesia. In the final, she lost to Vinesh Phogat of India.

In 2015, she won the gold medal in the women's 48 kg event at the 2015 Asian Wrestling Championships held in Doha, Qatar. She won the same event at the 2019 Asian Wrestling Championships held in Xi'an, China.

== Achievements ==
Year	Tournament	Location	Result	Event
2018	Asian Games	Jakarta, Indonesia	2nd	Freestyle 50 kg
2019	Asian Wrestling Championships	Xi'an, China	1st	Freestyle 50 kg
