= Wrestling at the 2018 Asian Games – Women's freestyle 50 kg =

Women's freestyle 50 kg at the 2018 Asian Games
- Venue: Jakarta Convention Center
- Date: 20 August 2018
- Competitors: 11 from 11 nations

Medalists
gold medal	Vinesh Phogat	India
silver medal	Yuki Irie	Japan
bronze medal	Kim Son-hyang	North Korea
bronze medal	Kim Hyung-joo	South Korea

The women's freestyle 50 kilograms wrestling competition at the 2018 Asian Games in Jakarta was held on 20 August 2018 at the Jakarta Convention Center Assembly Hall.

== Schedule ==
All times are Western Indonesia Time (UTC+07:00)

Date	Time	Event
Monday, 20 August 2018	13:00	1/8 finals
Monday, 20 August 2018	13:00	Quarterfinals
Monday, 20 August 2018	13:00	Semifinals
Monday, 20 August 2018	13:00	Repechages
Monday, 20 August 2018	19:00	Finals

== Results ==
Legend

- F — Won by fall

=== Main bracket ===
1/8 finals
Vinesh Phogat (IND)	8
Sun Yanan (CHN)	2
Erdenesükhiin Narangerel (MGL)	10^{F}
Manlika Esati (THA)	2
Dauletbike Yakhshimuratova (UZB)	12
Nguyễn Thị Xuân (VIE)	2

Quarterfinals
Kim Son-hyang (PRK)	10
Dit Samnang (CAM)	0
Yuki Irie (JPN)	8^{F}
Eka Setiawati (INA)	0
Kim Hyung-joo (KOR)	0
Vinesh Phogat (IND)	11
Erdenesükhiin Narangerel (MGL)	7
Dauletbike Yakhshimuratova (UZB)	4^{F}

Semifinals
Kim Son-hyang (PRK)	4
Yuki Irie (JPN)	13
Vinesh Phogat (IND)	10
Dauletbike Yakhshimuratova (UZB)	0

Final
Yuki Irie (JPN)	2
Vinesh Phogat (IND)	6

=== Repechage ===
Repechage round 1
Sun Yanan (CHN)	0
Kim Hyung-joo (KOR)	4^{F}

Bronze medals
Eka Setiawati (INA)	0
Kim Son-hyang (PRK)	10
Kim Hyung-joo (KOR)	6
Dauletbike Yakhshimuratova (UZB)	0

== Final standing ==
Rank	Athlete
1st place, gold medalist(s)	Vinesh Phogat (IND)
2nd place, silver medalist(s)	Yuki Irie (JPN)
3rd place, bronze medalist(s)	Kim Son-hyang (PRK)
3rd place, bronze medalist(s)	Kim Hyung-joo (KOR)
5	Eka Setiawati (INA)
5	Dauletbike Yakhshimuratova (UZB)
7	Erdenesükhiin Narangerel (MGL)
8	Nguyễn Thị Xuân (VIE)
8	Sun Yanan (CHN)
10	Manlika Esati (THA)
11	Dit Samnang (CAM)
