= Wrestling at the 2018 Commonwealth Games – Women's freestyle 50 kg =

Wrestling – Women's freestyle 50 kg at the 2018 Commonwealth Games
- Venue: Carrara Sports and Leisure Centre
- Dates: 14 April 2018
- Competitors: 4 from 4 nations

Medalists
gold medal	Vinesh Phogat	India
silver medal	Jessica MacDonald	Canada
bronze medal	Not awarded as there were only 4 competitors.

The women's freestyle 50 kg freestyle wrestling competition at the 2018 Commonwealth Games in Gold Coast, Australia was held on 14 April at the Carrara Sports and Leisure Centre.

== Results ==
As there were less than 6 competitors entered in this event, the competition was contested as a Nordic round with each athlete playing every other athlete. The medallists were determined by the standings after the completion of the Nordic round.

Legend

- F — Won by fall

=== Nordic group ===
Pos	Athlete	Pld	W	L	CP	TP
1	Vinesh Phogat (IND)	3	3	0	11	29
2	Jessica MacDonald (CAN)	3	2	1	9	24
3	Mercy Genesis (NGR)	3	1	2	5	15
4	Rupinder Kaur Sandhu (AUS)	3	0	3	0	0

Source: UWW

	Score		CP
Mercy Genesis (NGR)	5–6	Vinesh Phogat (IND)	1–3 VPO1
Jessica MacDonald (CAN)	10–0	Rupinder Kaur Sandhu (AUS)	4–0 VSU
Mercy Genesis (NGR)	0–11	Jessica MacDonald (CAN)	0–4 VSU
Vinesh Phogat (IND)	10–0	Rupinder Kaur Sandhu (AUS)	4–0 VSU
Mercy Genesis (NGR)	10–0	Rupinder Kaur Sandhu (AUS)	4–0 VSU
Vinesh Phogat (IND)	13–3	Jessica MacDonald (CAN)	4–1 VSU1
