= 2012 World Wrestling Championships – Women's freestyle 48 kg =

Women's freestyle 48 kg at the 2012 World Championships
- Venue: Millennium Place
- Dates: 29 September 2012
- Competitors: 16 from 16 nations

Medalists
| gold medal | Vanesa Kaladzinskaya | Belarus |
| silver medal | Eri Tosaka | Japan |
| bronze medal | Li Xiaomei | China |
| bronze medal | Jaqueline Schellin | Germany |

The women's freestyle 48 kilograms is a competition featured at the 2012 World Wrestling Championships, and was held at the Millennium Place in Strathcona County, Alberta, Canada on 29 September 2012.

This freestyle wrestling competition consisted of a single-elimination tournament, with a repechage used to determine the winners of two bronze medals. The two finalists faced off for gold and silver medals. Each wrestler who lost to one of the two finalists moved into the repechage, culminating in a pair of bronze medal matches featuring the semifinal losers each facing the remaining repechage opponent from their half of the bracket.

Each bout consisted of up to three rounds, lasting two minutes apiece. The wrestler who scored more points in each round was the winner of that rounds; the bout finished when one wrestler had won two rounds (and thus the match).

Vanesa Kaladzinskaya of Belarus won the gold medal after beating Eri Tosaka from Japan in the final.

== Results ==
Legend

- F — Won by fall

=== Main bracket ===
Round of 16
Lubov Salnikova (RUS) | 1 | 0
Li Xiaomei (CHN) | 2 | 3
Anna Łukasiak (POL) | 2 | 1
Priyanka Singh (IND) | 0 | 0
Oleksandra Kohut (UKR) | 0 | 1
Tatyana Amanzhol (KAZ) | 1 | 3
Clarissa Chun (USA) | 4 | 6 | 3
Vanesa Kaladzinskaya (BLR) | 5 | 1 | 4
Guadalupe Pérez (MEX) | 1 | 0 | 0
Estera Dobre (ROU) | 1 | 1 | 4
Patimat Bagomedova (AZE) | 1 | 1
Ashley McKilligan (CAN) | 0 | 0
Lenka Matejová (SVK) | 0 | 0
Eri Tosaka (JPN) | 2 | 1
Jaqueline Schellin (GER) | 0 | 3 | 4
Bayarmagnai Davaasüren (MGL) | 3 | 1 | 0

Quarterfinals
Li Xiaomei (CHN) | 3 | 1
Anna Łukasiak (POL) | 0 | 0
Tatyana Amanzhol (KAZ) | 0 | 4
Vanesa Kaladzinskaya (BLR) | 5 | 6
Estera Dobre (ROU) | 3 | 0
Patimat Bagomedova (AZE) | 3 | 3^{F}
Eri Tosaka (JPN) | 1 | 4^{F}
Jaqueline Schellin (GER) | 1 | 0

Semifinals
Li Xiaomei (CHN) | 1 | 0
Vanesa Kaladzinskaya (BLR) | 0 | 4^{F}
Patimat Bagomedova (AZE) | 0 | 1
Eri Tosaka (JPN) | 1 | 2

Final
Vanesa Kaladzinskaya (BLR) | 0 | 1 | 3
Eri Tosaka (JPN) | 2 | 0 | 2

=== Repechage ===
Repechage round 1
Clarissa Chun (USA) | 3 | 1 | 1
Tatyana Amanzhol (KAZ) | 2 | 1 | 3
Lenka Matejová (SVK) | 1 | 0
Jaqueline Schellin (GER) | 1 | 6

Bronze medals
Tatyana Amanzhol (KAZ) | 0 | 0
Li Xiaomei (CHN) | 3 | 2
Jaqueline Schellin (GER) | 0 | 1 | 2
Patimat Bagomedova (AZE) | 1 | 0 | 2
