= Wrestling at the 2018 Asian Games – Men's Greco-Roman 97 kg =

Men's Greco-Roman 97 kg at the 2018 Asian Games
- Venue: Jakarta Convention Center
- Date: 22 August 2018
- Competitors: 9 from 9 nations

Medalists
| gold medal | Cho Hyo-chul | South Korea |
| silver medal | Xiao Di | China |
| bronze medal | Yerulan Iskakov | Kazakhstan |
| bronze medal | Uzur Dzhuzupbekov | Kyrgyzstan |

The men's Greco-Roman 97 kilograms wrestling competition at the 2018 Asian Games in Jakarta was held on 22 August 2018 at the Jakarta Convention Center Assembly Hall.

== Schedule ==
All times are Western Indonesia Time (UTC+07:00)

| Date | Time | Event |
|---|---|---|
| Wednesday, 22 August 2018 | 13:00 | 1/8 finals |
| Wednesday, 22 August 2018 | 13:00 | Quarterfinals |
| Wednesday, 22 August 2018 | 13:00 | Semifinals |
| Wednesday, 22 August 2018 | 13:00 | Repechages |
| Wednesday, 22 August 2018 | 19:00 | Finals |

== Results ==
Legend

- F — Won by fall

=== Main bracket ===
1/8 finals
Jahongir Turdiev (UZB) | 0
Xiao Di (CHN) | 4

Quarterfinals
Ali Akbar Heidari (IRI) | 8
Ashar Ramadhani (INA) | 0
Cho Hyo-chul (KOR) | 6
Yerulan Iskakov (KAZ) | 1
Uzur Dzhuzupbekov (KGZ) | 7
Yuta Nara (JPN) | 1
Hardeep Singh (IND) | 3
Xiao Di (CHN) | 3

Semifinals
Ali Akbar Heidari (IRI) | 3
Cho Hyo-chul (KOR) | 4
Uzur Dzhuzupbekov (KGZ) | 1
Xiao Di (CHN) | 8^{F}

Final
Cho Hyo-chul (KOR) | 5
Xiao Di (CHN) | 4

=== Repechage ===
Repechage round 1
Jahongir Turdiev (UZB) | 6
Hardeep Singh (IND) | 1

Bronze medals
Yerulan Iskakov (KAZ) | 10
Ali Akbar Heidari (IRI) | 0
Jahongir Turdiev (UZB) | 0
Uzur Dzhuzupbekov (KGZ) | 2

== Final standing ==
| Rank | Athlete |
|---|---|
| 1st place, gold medalist(s) | Cho Hyo-chul (KOR) |
| 2nd place, silver medalist(s) | Xiao Di (CHN) |
| 3rd place, bronze medalist(s) | Yerulan Iskakov (KAZ) |
| 3rd place, bronze medalist(s) | Uzur Dzhuzupbekov (KGZ) |
| 5 | Ali Akbar Heidari (IRI) |
| 5 | Jahongir Turdiev (UZB) |
| 7 | Hardeep Singh (IND) |
| 8 | Yuta Nara (JPN) |
| 9 | Ashar Ramadhani (INA) |
