= Geneviève Morrison =

Canadian freestyle wrestler

Personal information
- Nationality: Canadian
- Born: 24 September 1988 (age 37) Shawville, Québec
- Weight: 48 kg (106 lb)

Sport
- Sport: Freestyle wrestling
- Club: Dinos Wrestling Club
Medal record
Women's freestyle wrestling
Representing Canada
World Championships
| Bronze medal – third place | 2015 Las Vegas | 48 kg |
Pan American Games
| Gold medal – first place | 2015 Toronto | 48 kg |

Geneviève Morrison (September 24, 1988) is a Canadian wrestler who wrestles in the 48 kg and 51 kg weight class and has earned gold medals in international competition, including the 2015 Pan American Championships.

== Career ==
Morrison placed first at the Nordhagen Classics in 2012, 2013 and 2015. She earned two gold medals at the FISU World University Championships in 2010 and 2012. She also won a gold medal at the Dave Schultz Memorial in 2012 and bronze medals in 2013 and 2015. In 2015, Morrison won a gold medal in the 48 kg weight class at the 2015 Pan American Championships.

Morrison competed at the 2024 Pan American Wrestling Olympic Qualification Tournament held in Acapulco, Mexico hoping to qualify for the 2024 Summer Olympics in Paris, France. She was eliminated in her second match by Yusneylys Guzmán of Cuba. Morrison also competed at the 2024 World Wrestling Olympic Qualification Tournament held in Istanbul, Turkey without qualifying for the Olympics.

She trains at the Dinos Wrestling Club in Calgary, Alberta.
