= Uzur Dzhuzupbekov =

Kyrgyzstani Greco-Roman wrestler

Personal information
- Nationality: Kyrgyzstani
- Born: 12 April 1996 (age 30) Bishkek, Kyrgyzstan

Sport
- Country: Kyrgyzstan
- Sport: Amateur wrestling
- Weight class: 97 kg
- Event: Greco-Roman
Medal record
Men's Greco-Roman wrestling
Representing Kyrgyzstan
Olympic Games
Bronze medal – third place	2024 Paris	97 kg
Asian Championships
Gold medal – first place	2019 Xi'an	97 kg
Silver medal – second place	2023 Astana	97 kg
Bronze medal – third place	2016 Astana	97 kg
Bronze medal – third place	2018 Bishkek	97 kg
Bronze medal – third place	2022 Ulaanbaatar	97 kg
Asian Games
Bronze medal – third place	2018 Jakarta	97 kg
Islamic Solidarity Games
Silver medal – second place	2017 Baku	98 kg
Silver medal – second place	2021 Konya	97 kg
Asian Indoor Games
Silver medal – second place	2017 Ashgabat	98 kg
Vehbi Emre & Hamit Kaplan Tournament
Bronze medal – third place	2021 Istanbul	97 kg
Bronze medal – third place	2024 Antalya	97 kg
Dan Kolov - Nikola Petrov Tournament
Silver medal – second place	2017 Russe	98 kg
Bronze medal – third place	2019 Russe	97 kg
Bronze medal – third place	2022 Veliko Tarnovo	97 kg
Grand Prix
Gold medal – first place	2021 Kiev	97 kg
Gold medal – first place	2025 Ulaanbaatar	97 kg
Bronze medal – third place	2023 Mladenovac	97 kg
Bronze medal – third place	2024 Warsaw	97 kg
Bronze medal – third place	2026 Tirana	97 kg
Asian Junior Championships
Bronze medal – third place	2014 Ulaanbaatar	96 kg
Bronze medal – third place	2015 Nay Pyi Taw	96 kg
Bronze medal – third place	2016 Manila	120 kg

Uzur Dzhuzupbekov (Kyrgyz: Үзүр Жусупбеков; born 12 April 1996) is a Kyrgyzstani Greco-Roman wrestler. He won one of the bronze medals in the 97 kg event at the 2024 Summer Olympics in Paris, France. He is a bronze medalist at the Asian Games and a two-time silver medalist at the Islamic Solidarity Games.

Dzhuzupbekov won the gold medal in the men's 97 kg event at the 2019 Asian Wrestling Championships held in Xi'an, China. He represented Kyrgyzstan at the 2020 Summer Olympics in Tokyo, Japan.

== Career ==
At the 2016 Asian Wrestling Championships held in Bangkok, Thailand, Dzhuzupbekov won one of the bronze medals in the men's 98 kg event.

In 2017, Dzhuzupbekov won the silver medal in the men's 98 kg event at the Islamic Solidarity Games in Baku, Azerbaijan. A few months later, at the 2017 Asian Indoor and Martial Arts Games held in Ashgabat, Turkmenistan, he also won the silver medal in the 98 kg event. In that same year, Dzhuzupbekov competed in the 98 kg event at the 2017 World Wrestling Championships in Paris, France. He lost his first match against Musa Evloev of Russia and in the repechage he lost his match against Balázs Kiss of Hungary.

At the 2018 Asian Wrestling Championships held in Bishkek, Kyrgyzstan, Dzhuzupbekov won one of the bronze medals in the men's 97 kg event. In that same year, he won one of the bronze medals in the men's 97 kg event at the 2018 Asian Games held in Jakarta, Indonesia. In his bronze medal match he defeated Jahongir Turdiev of Uzbekistan.

In 2019, Dzhuzupbekov competed in the 97 kg event at the World Wrestling Championships held in Nur-Sultan, Kazakhstan. He did not advance far as he was eliminated from the competition in his first match, against Cenk İldem of Turkey. In 2020, Dzhuzupbekov competed in the men's 97 kg event at the Individual Wrestling World Cup held in Belgrade, Serbia.

Dzhuzupbekov competed in the 97 kg event at the 2020 Summer Olympics held in Tokyo, Japan. He lost his first match against Artur Aleksanyan of Armenia and he was then eliminated in the repechage by Arvi Savolainen of Finland.

In 2022, Dzhuzupbekov won one of the bronze medals in the 97 kg event at the Dan Kolov & Nikola Petrov Tournament held in Veliko Tarnovo, Bulgaria. He won the silver medal in his event at the 2021 Islamic Solidarity Games held in Konya, Turkey.

Dzhuzupbekov won the silver medal in his event at the 2023 Asian Wrestling Championships held in Astana, Kazakhstan. He competed at the 2024 Asian Wrestling Olympic Qualification Tournament in Bishkek, Kyrgyzstan hoping to qualify for the 2024 Summer Olympics in Paris, France. Dzhuzupbekov was eliminated in his second match and he did not qualify for the Olympics. A few weeks later, he earned a quota place for Kyrgyzstan for the Olympics at the 2024 World Wrestling Olympic Qualification Tournament held in Istanbul, Turkey. Dzhuzupbekov won one of the bronze medals in the 97 kg event at the Olympics. He defeated Mohamed Gabr of Egypt in his bronze medal match.

== Achievements ==
Year	Tournament	Location	Result	Event
2016	Asian Championships	Bangkok, Thailand	3rd	Greco-Roman 98 kg
2017	Islamic Solidarity Games	Baku, Azerbaijan	2nd	Greco-Roman 98 kg
2017	Asian Indoor and Martial Arts Games	Ashgabat, Turkmenistan	2nd	Greco-Roman 98 kg
2018	Asian Championships	Bishkek, Kyrgyzstan	3rd	Greco-Roman 97 kg
2018	Asian Games	Jakarta, Indonesia	3rd	Greco-Roman 97 kg
2019	Asian Championships	Xi'an, China	1st	Greco-Roman 97 kg
2022	Asian Championships	Ulaanbaatar, Mongolia	3rd	Greco-Roman 97 kg
2022	Islamic Solidarity Games	Konya, Turkey	2nd	Greco-Roman 97 kg
2023	Asian Championships	Astana, Kazakhstan	2nd	Greco-Roman 97 kg
2024	Summer Olympics	Paris, France	3rd	Greco-Roman 97 kg
