= Turdiev (surname) =

Turdiev is a surname. Notable people with the surname include:

- Jahongir Turdiev (born 1993), Uzbek sport wrestler
- Dilshod Turdiev (born 1991), Uzbekistani Greco-Roman wrestler
