= Gulmaral Yerkebayeva =

Kazakhstani freestyle wrestler

Personal information
- Nationality: Kazakhstan
- Born: 4 November 1995 (age 30) Almaty Region, Kazakhstan
- Height: 174 cm (5 ft 9 in)

Sport
- Country: Kazakhstan
- Sport: Amateur wrestling
- Weight class: 76 kg
- Event: Freestyle
Medal record
Women's freestyle wrestling
Representing Kazakhstan
Asian Championships
Bronze medal – third place	2015 Doha	75 kg
Bronze medal – third place	2016 Bangkok	75 kg
Bronze medal – third place	2017 New Delhi	75 kg
Bronze medal – third place	2022 Ulaanbaatar	76 kg
Bronze medal – third place	2026 Bishkek	76 kg
Military World Games
Bronze medal – third place	2019 Wuhan	76 kg
Asian Indoor Games
Silver medal – second place	2017 Ashgabat	75 kg
World Military Championships
Silver medal – second place	2018 Moscow	76 kg
Yasar Dogu Tournament
Gold medal – first place	2023 Istanbul	76 kg
Silver medal – second place	2017 Istanbul	75 kg
Bronze medal – third place	2022 Istanbul	76 kg
Golden Grand Prix Ivan Yarygin
Bronze medal – third place	2020 Krasnoyarsk	76 kg
Dan Kolov - Nikola Petrov Tournament
Silver medal – second place	2018 Sofia	76 kg
Bronze medal – third place	2017 Ruse	75 kg
Grand Prix
Bronze medal – third place	2016 Dormagen	75 kg
Bronze medal – third place	2018 Ulaanbaatar	76 kg
Bronze medal – third place	2024 Budapest	72 kg
Bronze medal – third place	2026 Tirana	76 kg
World U23 Championships
Bronze medal – third place	2018 Bucharest	76 kg
World Juniors Championships
Bronze medal – third place	2015 Bahia	72 kg

Gulmaral Yerkebayeva (born 4 November 1995) is a Kazakhstani freestyle wrestler. She is a four-time bronze medalist at the Asian Wrestling Championships.

== Career ==
Yerkebayeva won the bronze medal in the women's 75 kg event at the 2017 Asian Wrestling Championships held in New Delhi, India. In the same year, she also won the silver medal in the women's 75 kg event at the 2017 Asian Indoor and Martial Arts Games held in Ashgabat, Turkmenistan.

In 2019, Yerkebayeva represented Kazakhstan at the Military World Games held in Wuhan, China and she won one of the bronze medals in the 76 kg event.

In 2022, Yerkebayeva won one of the bronze medals in the 76 kg event at the Yasar Dogu Tournament held in Istanbul, Turkey. She also won the bronze medal in her event at the 2022 Asian Wrestling Championships held in Ulaanbaatar, Mongolia. She competed in the 76 kg event at the 2022 World Wrestling Championships held in Belgrade, Serbia.

== Achievements ==
Year	Tournament	Location	Result	Event
2015	Asian Championships	Doha, Qatar	3rd	Freestyle 75 kg
2016	Asian Championships	Bangkok, Thailand	3rd	Freestyle 75 kg
2017	Asian Championships	New Delhi, India	3rd	Freestyle 75 kg
2017	Asian Indoor and Martial Arts Games	Ashgabat, Turkmenistan	2nd	Freestyle 75 kg
2019	Military World Games	Wuhan, China	3rd	Freestyle 76 kg
2022	Asian Championships	Ulaanbaatar, Mongolia	3rd	Freestyle 76 kg
