= Cho Hyo-chul =

South Korean Greco-Roman wrestler

Personal information
- Born: 1 September 1986 (age 39)

Sport
- Country: South Korea
- Sport: Amateur wrestling
- Event: Greco-Roman

Korean name
- Hangul: 조효철
- RR: Jo Hyocheol
- MR: Cho Hyoch'ŏl
Medal record
Asian Games
Gold medal – first place	2018 Jakarta	97 kg
Asian Championships
Silver medal – second place	2007 Bishkek	84 kg
Silver medal – second place	2011 Tashkent	84 kg
Bronze medal – third place	2008 Jeju City	84 kg

Cho Hyo-chul (born 1 September 1986) is a South Korean Greco-Roman wrestler. He won the gold medal in the 97 kg event at the 2018 Asian Games held in Jakarta, Indonesia.

Cho attended Gwangju Physical Education High School.
