= 2016 Asian Wrestling Championships =

- Host city: Bangkok, Thailand
- Dates: 17–21 February 2016
- Stadium: Bangkok Youth Center

Champions
- Freestyle: Iran
- Greco-Roman: Iran
- Women: China

The 2016 Asian Wrestling Championships was held at the Bangkok Youth Center in Bangkok, Thailand. The event took place from February 17 to February 21, 2016.

== Medal table ==
Rank	Nation	Gold	Silver	Bronze	Total
1	Iran	9	2	3	14
2	Kyrgyzstan	3	2	5	10
3	China	3	1	8	12
4	Kazakhstan	2	7	8	17
5	Japan	2	2	1	5
6	Mongolia	2	1	9	12
7	India	1	3	5	9
8	South Korea	1	0	4	5
9	Bahrain	1	0	1	2
10	Uzbekistan	0	3	1	4
11	North Korea	0	2	0	2
12	Vietnam	0	1	2	3
13	Tajikistan	0	0	1	1
Totals (13 entries)		24	24	48	96

== Team ranking ==
Rank	Men's freestyle		Men's Greco-Roman		Women's freestyle	
Rank	Team	Points	Team	Points	Team	Points
1	Iran	73	Iran	71	China	65
2	Mongolia	63	Kazakhstan	58	Japan	58
3	Kazakhstan	56	Kyrgyzstan	49	Kazakhstan	53
4	India	41	Uzbekistan	47	India	52
5	Kyrgyzstan	40	South Korea	44	Mongolia	47
6	Japan	35	China	42	South Korea	43
7	China	31	India	42	Vietnam	38
8	South Korea	23	Turkmenistan	16	Uzbekistan	30
9	Uzbekistan	22	Japan	15	North Korea	23
10	Tajikistan	14	Iraq	14	Kyrgyzstan	16

== Medal summary ==
=== Men's freestyle ===
Event	Gold	Silver	Bronze
57 kg	Sandeep Tomar; India	Jong Hak-jin; North Korea	Sodnomdashiin Batbold; Mongolia
57 kg	Sandeep Tomar; India	Jong Hak-jin; North Korea	Ulukbek Zholdoshbekov; Kyrgyzstan
61 kg	Daulet Niyazbekov; Kazakhstan	Behnam Ehsanpour; Iran	Zhang Buladaoriji; China
61 kg	Daulet Niyazbekov; Kazakhstan	Behnam Ehsanpour; Iran	Tümenbilegiin Tüvshintulga; Mongolia
65 kg	Meisam Nassiri; Iran	Nurlan Bekzhanov; Kazakhstan	Ma Cunjun; China
65 kg	Meisam Nassiri; Iran	Nurlan Bekzhanov; Kazakhstan	Batchuluuny Batmagnai; Mongolia
70 kg	Adam Batirov; Bahrain	Vinod Kumar Omprakash; India	Mohammad Naderi; Iran
70 kg	Adam Batirov; Bahrain	Vinod Kumar Omprakash; India	Buyanjavyn Batzorig; Mongolia
74 kg	Mostafa Hosseinkhani; Iran	Zhiger Zakirov; Kazakhstan	Saiakbai Usupov; Kyrgyzstan
74 kg	Mostafa Hosseinkhani; Iran	Zhiger Zakirov; Kazakhstan	Azamat Sufiev; Tajikistan
86 kg	Ehsan Lashgari; Iran	Orgodolyn Üitümen; Mongolia	Gwon Hyeok-beom; South Korea
86 kg	Ehsan Lashgari; Iran	Orgodolyn Üitümen; Mongolia	Aslan Kakhidze; Kazakhstan
97 kg	Reza Yazdani; Iran	Magomed Musaev; Kyrgyzstan	Bakdaulet Almentay; Kazakhstan
97 kg	Reza Yazdani; Iran	Magomed Musaev; Kyrgyzstan	Dorjkhandyn Khüderbulga; Mongolia
125 kg	Parviz Hadi; Iran	Daulet Shabanbay; Kazakhstan	Aiaal Lazarev; Kyrgyzstan
125 kg	Parviz Hadi; Iran	Daulet Shabanbay; Kazakhstan	Natsagsürengiin Zolboo; Mongolia

=== Men's Greco-Roman ===
Event	Gold	Silver	Bronze
59 kg	Kanybek Zholchubekov; Kyrgyzstan	Saman Abdevali; Iran	Meirambek Ainagulov; Kazakhstan
59 kg	Kanybek Zholchubekov; Kyrgyzstan	Saman Abdevali; Iran	Gaurav Sharma; India
66 kg	Choi Gi-uk; South Korea	Askhat Zhanbirov; Kazakhstan	Mehdi Zeidvand; Iran
66 kg	Choi Gi-uk; South Korea	Askhat Zhanbirov; Kazakhstan	Aram Vardanyan; Uzbekistan
71 kg	Afshin Biabangard; Iran	Nurbek Kholmukhammatov; Uzbekistan	Darkhan Bayakhmetov; Kazakhstan
71 kg	Afshin Biabangard; Iran	Nurbek Kholmukhammatov; Uzbekistan	Zhang Ridong; China
75 kg	Doszhan Kartikov; Kazakhstan	Dilshod Turdiev; Uzbekistan	Ruslan Tsarev; Kyrgyzstan
75 kg	Doszhan Kartikov; Kazakhstan	Dilshod Turdiev; Uzbekistan	Payam Boveiri; Iran
80 kg	Ramin Taheri; Iran	Aishan Aisha; China	Harpreet Singh Sandhu; India
80 kg	Ramin Taheri; Iran	Aishan Aisha; China	Askhat Dilmukhamedov; Kazakhstan
85 kg	Janarbek Kenjeev; Kyrgyzstan	Muhammadali Shamsiddinov; Uzbekistan	Park Jin-sung; South Korea
85 kg	Janarbek Kenjeev; Kyrgyzstan	Muhammadali Shamsiddinov; Uzbekistan	Kong Liang; China
98 kg	Mehdi Aliyari; Iran	Hardeep Singh; India	Uzur Dzhuzupbekov; Kyrgyzstan
98 kg	Mehdi Aliyari; Iran	Hardeep Singh; India	Mohamed Abdelfatah; Bahrain
130 kg	Amir Ghasemi Monjazi; Iran	Murat Ramonov; Kyrgyzstan	Naveen Sevlia; India
130 kg	Amir Ghasemi Monjazi; Iran	Murat Ramonov; Kyrgyzstan	Damir Kuzembayev; Kazakhstan

=== Women's freestyle ===
Event	Gold	Silver	Bronze
48 kg	Sun Yanan; China	Irina Borissova; Kazakhstan	Vũ Thị Hằng; Vietnam
48 kg	Sun Yanan; China	Irina Borissova; Kazakhstan	Eri Tosaka; Japan
53 kg	Pang Qianyu; China	Nguyễn Thị Lụa; Vietnam	Oh Hyun-young; South Korea
53 kg	Pang Qianyu; China	Nguyễn Thị Lụa; Vietnam	Vinesh Phogat; India
55 kg	Davaasükhiin Otgontsetseg; Mongolia	Priyanka Phogat; India	Kiều Thị Ly; Vietnam
55 kg	Davaasükhiin Otgontsetseg; Mongolia	Priyanka Phogat; India	Um Ji-eun; South Korea
58 kg	Aisuluu Tynybekova; Kyrgyzstan	Aiyim Abdildina; Kazakhstan	Zhou Zhangting; China
58 kg	Aisuluu Tynybekova; Kyrgyzstan	Aiyim Abdildina; Kazakhstan	Enkhbatyn Gantuyaa; Mongolia
60 kg	Han Yingyan; China	Ayaka Ito; Japan	Otgonbatyn Oyuuntuyaa; Mongolia
60 kg	Han Yingyan; China	Ayaka Ito; Japan	Madina Bakbergenova; Kazakhstan
63 kg	Risako Kawai; Japan	Rim Jong-sim; North Korea	Anita Sheoran; India
63 kg	Risako Kawai; Japan	Rim Jong-sim; North Korea	Xu Rui; China
69 kg	Sara Dosho; Japan	Elmira Syzdykova; Kazakhstan	Zorigtyn Bolortungalag; Mongolia
69 kg	Sara Dosho; Japan	Elmira Syzdykova; Kazakhstan	Wang Jiao; China
75 kg	Ochirbatyn Burmaa; Mongolia	Rino Abe; Japan	Qiandegenchagan; China
75 kg	Ochirbatyn Burmaa; Mongolia	Rino Abe; Japan	Gulmaral Yerkebayeva; Kazakhstan

== Participating nations ==
285 competitors from 25 nations competed.

- Bahrain (2)
- China (23)
- Chinese Taipei (10)
- India (24)
- Iran (16)
- Iraq (7)
- Japan (24)
- Jordan (1)
- Kazakhstan (24)
- Kyrgyzstan (17)
- Mongolia (16)
- North Korea (8)
- Pakistan (4)
- Palestine (1)
- Philippines (3)
- Qatar (2)
- Singapore (4)
- South Korea (22)
- Sri Lanka (6)
- Tajikistan (9)
- Thailand (11)
- Turkmenistan (13)
- United Arab Emirates (1)
- Uzbekistan (24)
- Vietnam (13)
