= Younes Sarmasti =

Iranian wrestler (born 1994)

Personal information
- Full name: Younes Sarmasti
- Nationality: Iran
- Born: 4 April 1994 (age 32) Malekan, Iran
- Height: 1.68 m (5 ft 6 in)
- Weight: 57

Sport
- Style: Freestyle
- Club: Samen-alhojaj Sabzevar
- Coach: Amirali Aliyarimaleki
Medal record
Men's Freestyle wrestling
Representing Iran
Wrestling World Cup
Gold medal – first place	2017 Kermanshah	57 kg
World University Championships
Gold medal – first place	2016 Corum	57 kg
Asian Championships
Bronze medal – third place	2015 Doha	57 kg
World Junior Championships
Bronze medal – third place	2011 Budapest	58 kg
Gold medal – first place	2013 Sofia	55 kg
Asian Junior Championships
Bronze medal – third place	2011 Pattaya	55 kg
Takhti Cup
Gold medal – first place	2014 Kermanshah	57 kg
Gold medal – first place	2015 Tehran	57 kg
Gold medal – first place	2016 Mashhad	57 kg
International tournament
Bronze medal – third place	2016 Russia	57 kg
Bronze medal – third place	2014 Russia	57 kg

Younes Sarmasti (Persian: یونس سرمستی, born 4 April 1994 in Malekan, East Azerbaijan) is an Iranian freestyle wrestler. He won a bronze in the Asian Championships 2015. Sarmasti also won a gold medal in Junior Worlds 2013 and Takhti Cup 2015.

== Sporting career ==
=== Wrestling World Cup ===
- Gold: Iran, Kermanshah, 2017

=== FISU World University Championships ===
- Gold: Turkey, Çorum, 2016

=== Asian Championships ===
- Bronze: Qatar, Doha, 2015

=== World Junior Championships ===
- Bronze, Hungary, Budapest, 2011
- Gold, Bulgaria, Sofia, 2013

=== Asian Junior Championships ===
- Bronze, Thailand, Pattaya, 2011

=== Takhti Cup ===
- Gold: Kermanshah, 2014
- Gold: Tehran, 2015
- Gold: Mashhad, 2016

=== Dmitry Korkin International Tournament ===
- Bronze: Russia, Yakutsk, 2014
- Bronze: Russia, Yakutsk, 2016

== See also ==
- Iran national freestyle wrestling athletes
