= Alyssa Lampe =

American freestyle wrestler

Personal information
- Full name: Alyssa Rae Nicole Lampe
- Born: March 10, 1988 (age 38) United States
- Height: 5 ft 1 in (155 cm)
- Weight: 105.5 lb (48 kg)

Sport
- Sport: Sport wrestling
- Event: Freestyle
- Club: Sunkist Kids
- Coached by: Terry Steiner; Erin Tomeo
Medal record
Women's freestyle wrestling
Representing United States
World Championships
Bronze medal – third place	2013 Budapest	48 kg (106 lb)
Bronze medal – third place	2012 Strathcona	51 kg (112 lb)
Pan American Games
Bronze medal – third place	2015 Toronto	48 kg (106 lb)
Pan American Championships
Gold medal – first place	2009 Venezuela	48 kg (106 lb)

Alyssa Rae Nicole Lampe (born March 10, 1988) is an American freestyle wrestler. She won bronze medals in the 48 and 51 kg (106 and 112 lb) weight classes at the 2012 and 2013 Women's World Championships. She competes with the Sunkist Kids Wrestling Club. Lampe has been a member of Team USA from 2009–16 and then returned in 2021–22. She has been a member of the United States's World team a total of five times.

== Career ==
=== High school ===
Originally from Tomahawk, Wisconsin, Lampe wrestled for Tomahawk High School. She was the first female wrestler to qualify for the state wrestling meet, and the first girl to wrestle for a Wisconsin state championship. She competed at state three times and placed second at the 2006 State Championships. During her senior year, she won 47 of 53 matches, but lost the Division 2 state title to Thane Antczak of Chetek/Prairie Farm by a score of 6–3 after defeating Antczak 2–1 in the individual sectional finals. She finished her high school career 133-21 for a .811 winning percentage competing against boys.

=== Collegiate ===
After high school, she attended Northern Michigan University, where she was part of the U.S. Olympic Education Program and trained with coaches Shannyn Gillespie and Tony De Anda. In May 2007, Lampe was recognized as the women's freestyle athlete of the semester at the U.S. Olympic Education Center. She eventually decided to move to Colorado Springs, Colorado, to join the U.S. Olympic Training Center resident program. At the training center, she trained with coaches Terry Steiner and Izzy Iboinikov.

=== Age-group programs (2004–2006) ===
Lampe's first successes came at national level in 2004. She would eventually earn bronze at the 2007 and 2008 Junior Worlds.

=== Senior-level career (2007–2016) ===
Lampe began her Senior career in 2007 and would go on to be a six-time National Team member at the 48 kg (106 lb) weight class. She represented the United States at five World Championships and earned bronze twice. Her first bronze and first international medal win was on at the Junior World Championships in Beijing in 2007. She again won a bronze medal in the 48 kg (106 lb) weight class at the 2008 Junior World Championships in Istanbul.

She came close to making the U.S. Senior World Team in both 2008 and 2009, placing second to 2008 World Champion and Olympian Clarissa Chun. She would eventually beat Chun in 2010 to win the title at the World Team Trials and qualify for her first Senior World Team.

In 2009, after placing third at the U.S. Championships in 51 kg (112 lb) weight class, Lampe won the title in that same weight class at the Pan American Championships in Maracaibo. She won the title against competitors Terri McNutt (Canada) and Romina Gonzalez (Argentina). In 2010, Lampe was the U.S. champion in the 48 kg (106 lb) weight class ahead of Mary Kelly, Sara Fulp-Allen and Victoria Anthony. She also won the World Championship Trials ahead of Clarissa Chun and Sara Fulp-Allen. At the 2010 World Championships in Moscow, she lost her first match against Iwona Matkowska, Poland, on points. Since Matkowska did not reach the final, Lampe was eliminated and came in 20th place.

In 2011, Lampe took second place behind Chun at the World Championship Trials and the U.S. Olympic Trials. She competed in the 51 kg (112 lb) weight class at the 2012 Women's World Championships, beating Angela Dorogan (Azerbaijan) and Roksanan Zasina (Poland), before losing to Sun Yanan (China). She would eventually earn a bronze medal by Elenora Abutalipowa of Kazakhstan.

Lampe won back-to-back bronze medals at the 2012 and 2013 Senior World Championships.

In 2013, Lampe became USA champion for the second time in the 48 kg (106 lb) weight class and also won the World Championship Trials. At the 2013 World Championships in Budapest, she won another bronze medal with a win against Davi Nirmala (India), a loss against Eri Tosaka (Japan) and victories over Madalina Linguraru (Romania) Tatjana Amanschol-Bakatschuk (Kazakhstan) and Melanie LeSaffre (France).

==== Individual placings and medals ====
Year	Place	Contest	Weight Class
2004	2nd	USA Wrestling Junior Nationals and Cadet National Championships in Fargo, North Dakota	46 kg (101 lb)
2004	1st	Body Bar	
2005	3rd	Junior Nationals	
2005	1st	Body Bar Women's FILA Cadet Nationals in El Cajon, California	46 kg (101 lb)
2005	3rd	FILA Junior Body Bar	
2006	2nd	Junior Nationals	
2007	1st	Missouri Valley Showcase in Marshall, Missouri (senior division)	48 kg (106 lb)
2007	5th	Senior National Championships in Las Vegas, Nevada	48 kg (106 lb)
2007	1st	Body Bar FILA Junior National Championships in Colorado Springs, Colorado	48 kg (106 lb)
2007	3rd	Junior World Championships (U 20) in Beijing, China	48 kg (106 lb)
2007	5th	U.S. World Team Trials	
2008	1st	New York Athletic Club International Open	
2008	4th	Dave Schultz Memorial in Colorado Springs, Colorado	48 kg (106 lb)
2008	2nd	U.S. World Team Trials	
2008	3rd	Junior World Championships (U 20) in Istanbul, Turkey	48 kg (106 lb)
2008	7th	U.S. Nationals	
2009	5th	Dave Schultz Memorial in Colorado Springs, Colorado	48 kg (106 lb)
2009	1st	Pan American Championship in Maracaibo, Venezuela	48 kg (106 lb)
2009	1st	New York Athletic Club International Open	
2009	3rd	Sunkist Kids International Open	
2009	2nd	U.S. World Team Trials	
2009	3rd	U.S. Nationals	
2010	1st	World Team Trials in Council Bluffs, Iowa	48 kg (106 lb)
2010	1st	U.S. Open	48 kg (106 lb)
2010	3rd	Dave Schultz Memorial in Colorado Springs, Colorado	48 kg (106 lb)
2010	4th	World Cup in Nanjing, China	48 kg (106 lb)
2010	3rd	Heydar Aliyev Golden Grand Prix in Baku, Azerbaijan	48 kg (106 lb)
2010	20th	World Cup in Moscow, Russia	48 kg (106 lb)
2010	2nd	New York Athletic Club International Open	48 kg (106 lb)
2011	5th	World Cup in Lievin, France	48 kg (106 lb)
2011	4th	Sunkist Kids International Open in Phoenix, Arizona	48 kg (106 lb)
2011	2nd	U.S. World Team Trials	
2011	1st	Guelph Open in Canada	
2012	1st	Dave Schultz Memorial in Colorado Springs, Colorado	48 kg (106 lb)
2012	3rd	Pan American Championship in Colorado Springs	48 kg (106 lb)
2012	5th	World Cup in Tokyo, Japan	51 kg (112 lb)
2012	1st	Canada Cup in Guelph, Canada	48 kg (106 lb)
2012	1st	Hargobind International in Burnaby Mountain, Canada	48 kg (106 lb)
2012	1st	U.S. Women's World Team Wrestle-Off in Colorado Springs, Colorado	51 kg (112 lb)
2012	2nd	U.S. Olympic Team Trials	48 kg (106 lb)
2012	4th	U.S. Open	
2012	3rd	World Championships in Strathcona County, Canada	51 kg (112 lb)
2012	1st	New York Athletic Club International Open	48 kg (106 lb)
2013	3rd	Dave Schultz Memorial in Colorado Springs, Colorado	48 kg (106 lb)
2013	1st	Ukrainian Memorial International Tournament in Kyiv, Ukraine	48 kg (106 lb)
2013	1st	Spanish Grand Prix	48 kg (106 lb)
2013	3rd	World Cup in Budapest, Hungary	48 kg (106 lb)
2013	1st	Poland Open in Spala, Poland	48 kg (106 lb)
2013	1st	U.S. World Team Trials	
2013	1st	U.S. Open	
2014	5th	World Championships in Tashkent, Uzbekistan	48 kg (106 lb)
2014	2nd	Open Cup of Russia	48 kg (106 lb)
2014	1st	Bill Farrell International in New York	48 kg (106 lb)
2014	3rd	Spanish Grand Prix	48 kg (106 lb)
2014	2nd	Dave Schultz Memorial in Colorado Springs, Colorado	48 kg (106 lb)
2014	1st	U.S. World Team Trials at Madison, Wisconsin	48 kg (106 lb)
2014	1st	U.S. Open at Las Vegas, Nevada	48 kg (106 lb)
2014	3rd	Klippan Lady Open	48 kg (106 lb)
2015	3rd	Pan American Games in Toronto, Canada	48 kg (106 lb)
2015	9th	World Championships in Las Vegas, Nevada	48 kg (106 lb)
2015	3rd	Cerro Pelado International in Cuba	48 kg (106 lb)
2015	1st	U.S. World Team Trials	
2015	2nd	U.S. Open	
2016	3rd	Pan American Olympic Games Qualifier	
2016	3rd	Olympic test event in Brazil	
2019	13th	Poland Open	50 kg (110 lb)
2019	1st	Senior Nationals in Fort Worth, Texas	50 kg (110 lb)
2020	3rd	Senior Nationals	50 kg (110 lb)
2021	4th	World Team Trials	
2021	3rd	U.S. Olympic Team Trials	50 kg (110 lb)
2022	1st	World Team Trials Challenge Tournament in Coralville, Iowa	50 kg (110 lb)

=== Retirement (2016–2019) ===
Lampe took a hiatus from the sport in 2016. In December 2019, she returned to wrestling with a No. 1 finish at the 2019 Senior Nationals.

=== Return to wrestling (2019–present) ===
Lampe returned to wrestling in 2019 to train for the 2020 Tokyo Olympics, training with fellow Team USA member Erin Clodgo. While training in Vermont, Lampe joined Clodgo as a coach at Norwich University, which began her professional coaching career.

In her first competition back, Lampe won the December 2019 Senior Nationals title at the 50 kg (110 lb) weight class in Fort Worth, Texas. She started training at the Beaver Dam Regional Training Center in December 2020.

During the 2021–22 season, Lampe was ranked No. 3 at the 50 kg (110 lb) weight class. She was named a member of the 2022 U.S. World Cup team for the freestyle event in Coralville, Iowa, December 10–11, 2022.

== Coaching ==
Lampe started coaching as a volunteer assistant coach at Norwich University in 2019. She continued there until 2021 when she was hired as a full-time assistant coach at Linfield University.

== Awards ==
Lampe was named the 2013 USA Wrestling Women's Wrestler of the Year and 2013 U.S. Open Outstanding Wrestler. She was the first female athlete inducted into the George Martin Wrestling Hall of Fame in Wisconsin. Other accolades include:

- USA Wrestling Athlete of the Week in 2019 after winning the Senior Nationals in her first return competition.
- TheMat.com Wrestler of the Week in 2014 after winning the U.S. Open on April 19, 2014, earning her a spot at the World Team Trials.
- TheMat.com Wrestler of the Week in 2013 after winning the Poland Open championship.
- USOC Athlete of the Month, November 2012.
- TheMat.com Wrestler of the Week in 2012 after winning the U.S. Women's World Team Wrestle-off.
- TheMat.com Wrestler of the Week for June 8–14, 2010, after winning th 48 kg (106 lb) title at the World Team Trials.
- Women's Freestyle Athlete of the Semester at the U.S. Olympic Education Center, May 2007
- Outstanding Wrestler at the 2005 Body Bar Women's FILA Cadet Nationals.
