= Nguyễn Thị Lụa =

Vietnamese freestyle wrestler (born 1991)

Personal information
- Full name: Nguyễn Thị Lụa
- Nationality: Vietnamese
- Born: 24 July 1991 (age 35) Quốc Oai, Vietnam
- Height: 1.53 m (5 ft 0 in)
- Weight: 48 kg (106 lb)

Sport
- Country: Vietnam
- Sport: Wrestling
- Event: Women's freestyle -48 kg
- Coached by: Trần Văn Sơn

Achievements and titles
- National finals: Vietnam
Medal record
Women's freestyle wrestling
Representing Vietnam
Asian Games
Silver medal – second place	2010 Guangzhou	-48 kg
Asian Championships
Silver medal – second place	2014 Astana	-53 kg
Silver medal – second place	2016 Bangkok	-53 kg
Bronze medal – third place	2010 New Delhi	-48 kg
Bronze medal – third place	2009 Pattaya	-48 kg

Nguyễn Thị Lụa (born 24 July 1991; living in Hanoi) is a Vietnamese freestyle wrestler.

She is the first Vietnamese wrestler to qualify for the Olympics since the return of Vietnam to the Olympics in 1992. She competed in the women's 48 kg freestyle at the 2012 Summer Olympics. At the 2016 Summer Olympics she competed in the women's 53 kg freestyle.
