= Jessica Blaszka =

Dutch wrestler (born 1992)

Personal information
- Full name: Jessica Cornelia Francisca Blaszka
- Nationality: Netherlands
- Born: 5 August 1992 (age 33) Heerlen, Netherlands
- Height: 160 cm (5 ft 3 in)
- Weight: 52 kg (115 lb)

Sport
- Sport: Freestyle wrestling
- Club: Sportcentrum Kops Amsterdam
Medal record
Women's freestyle wrestling
Representing Netherlands
World Championships
| Bronze medal – third place | 2015 Las Vegas | 48 kg |
European Championships
| Silver medal – second place | 2020 Rome | 53 kg |
| Bronze medal – third place | 2019 Bucharest | 53 kg |

Jessica Blaszka (born 5 August 1992 in Heerlen) is a retired Dutch wrestler who wrestled mainly in the 48 kg weight class. She is a bronze medalist at the World Wrestling Championships and a two-time medalist at the European Wrestling Championships.

== Career ==
In the youth category she became European Champion in 2007 (43 kg), 2008 (46 kg) and 2009 (46 kg) and won the silver medal as a junior in 2010 (48 kg). She represented the Netherlands at the 2015 European Games in Baku, Azerbaijan, where she lost in the quarter-finals and finished in 9th position. She won the bronze medal in the women's freestyle 48 kg at the 2015 World Wrestling Championships in Las Vegas, United States. It was the first medal for the Netherlands at a senior international wrestling championship (World, European) after 28 years. With this third place she met the Dutch qualification standard to compete at the 2016 Summer Olympics.

In March 2021, she competed at the European Qualification Tournament in Budapest, Hungary hoping to qualify for the 2020 Summer Olympics in Tokyo, Japan. She failed to qualify at this tournament and she also failed to qualify for the Olympics at the World Olympic Qualification Tournament held in Sofia, Bulgaria. A few days after her result at the World Olympic Qualification Tournament, she decided to end her wrestling career.

== Personal ==
As of 2015 she lives together with her parents and sister Virginia and dog Emo in Landgraaf. She went to the Herle-College and Arcus-College.

== Results ==
=== Senior results ===
European Games

9th 2015 European Games

World Championships

- 16th 2010 World Wrestling Championships
- 12th 2011 World Wrestling Championships
- 9th 2014 World Wrestling Championships
- (bronze) 2015 World Wrestling Championships

European Championships

- 10th 2010 European Wrestling Championships (48 kg)
- 12th 2011 European Wrestling Championships (48 kg)
- 7th 2012 European Wrestling Championships (51 kg)

Because she was injured she did not participate at the 2012 World Wrestling Championships, 2013 World Wrestling Championships, 2013 European Wrestling Championships and 2014 European Wrestling Championships.
