= Dauletbike Yakhshimuratova =

Uzbekistani freestyle wrestler

Personal information
- Born: 4 December 1991 (age 34)

Sport
- Country: Uzbekistan
- Sport: Amateur wrestling
- Event: Freestyle
Medal record
Women's freestyle wrestling
Representing Uzbekistan
Asian Championships
Bronze medal – third place	2020 New Delhi	50 kg
Asian Indoor and Martial Arts Games
Bronze medal – third place	2017 Ashgabat	48 kg
Golden Grand Prix Ivan Yarygin
Bronze medal – third place	2019 Krasnoyarsk	50 kg

Dauletbike Yakhshimuratova (born 4 December 1991) is an Uzbekistani freestyle wrestler. She won one of the bronze medals in the women's 48 kg event at the 2017 Asian Indoor and Martial Arts Games held in Ashgabat, Turkmenistan.

== Career ==
In 2014, Yakhshimuratova competed in the women's freestyle 48 kg event at the World Wrestling Championships held in Tashkent, Uzbekistan. She was eliminated from the competition in her first match, against Carolina Castillo of Colombia. In that same year, she also represented Uzbekistan at the 2014 Asian Games in the women's freestyle 48 kg event but failed to win a medal; she was eliminated from the competition by Vinesh Phogat of India.

Yakhshimuratova lost her bronze medal match against Kim Hyung-joo of South Korea in the women's freestyle 50 kg event at the 2018 Asian Games in Jakarta, Indonesia. The following year, Yakhshimuratova competed in the women's freestyle 50 kg event at the 2019 World Wrestling Championships held in Nur-Sultan, Kazakhstan. She was eliminated from the competition in her second match, against Oksana Livach of Ukraine.

In 2019, at the Golden Grand Prix Ivan Yarygin held in Krasnoyarsk, Russia, she won one of the bronze medals in the women's 50 kg event. In 2020, she won one of the bronze medals in the women's 50 kg event at the Asian Wrestling Championships held in New Delhi, India. In 2021, she competed at the Asian Olympic Qualification Tournament hoping to qualify for the 2020 Summer Olympics in Tokyo, Japan. Yakhshimuratova did not qualify at this tournament and she also failed to qualify for the Olympics at the World Olympic Qualification Tournament held in Sofia, Bulgaria.

== Achievements ==
Year	Tournament	Location	Result	Event
2017	Asian Indoor and Martial Arts Games	Ashgabat, Turkmenistan	3rd	Freestyle 48 kg
2020	Asian Championships	New Delhi, India	3rd	Freestyle 50 kg
