= Kim Hyon-gyong =

North Korean sport wrestler (born 1995)

Personal information
- Born: April 17, 1995 (age 31)

Sport
- Country: North Korea
- Sport: Freestyle wrestling
Medal record
Women's freestyle wrestling
Representing North Korea
World Championships
Bronze medal – third place	2014 Tashkent	48 kg

- Kim Hyon-gyong
- Hangul: 김현경
- RR: Gim Hyeongyeong
- MR: Kim Hyŏn'gyŏng

Kim Hyon-gyong (Korean pronunciation: [kim.ɦjʌn.ɡjʌŋ] or [kim] [hjʌn.ɡjʌŋ]) is a wrestler from North Korea. She won a bronze medal at the 2014 World Wrestling Championships.
