= Eri Tosaka =

Japanese freestyle wrestler

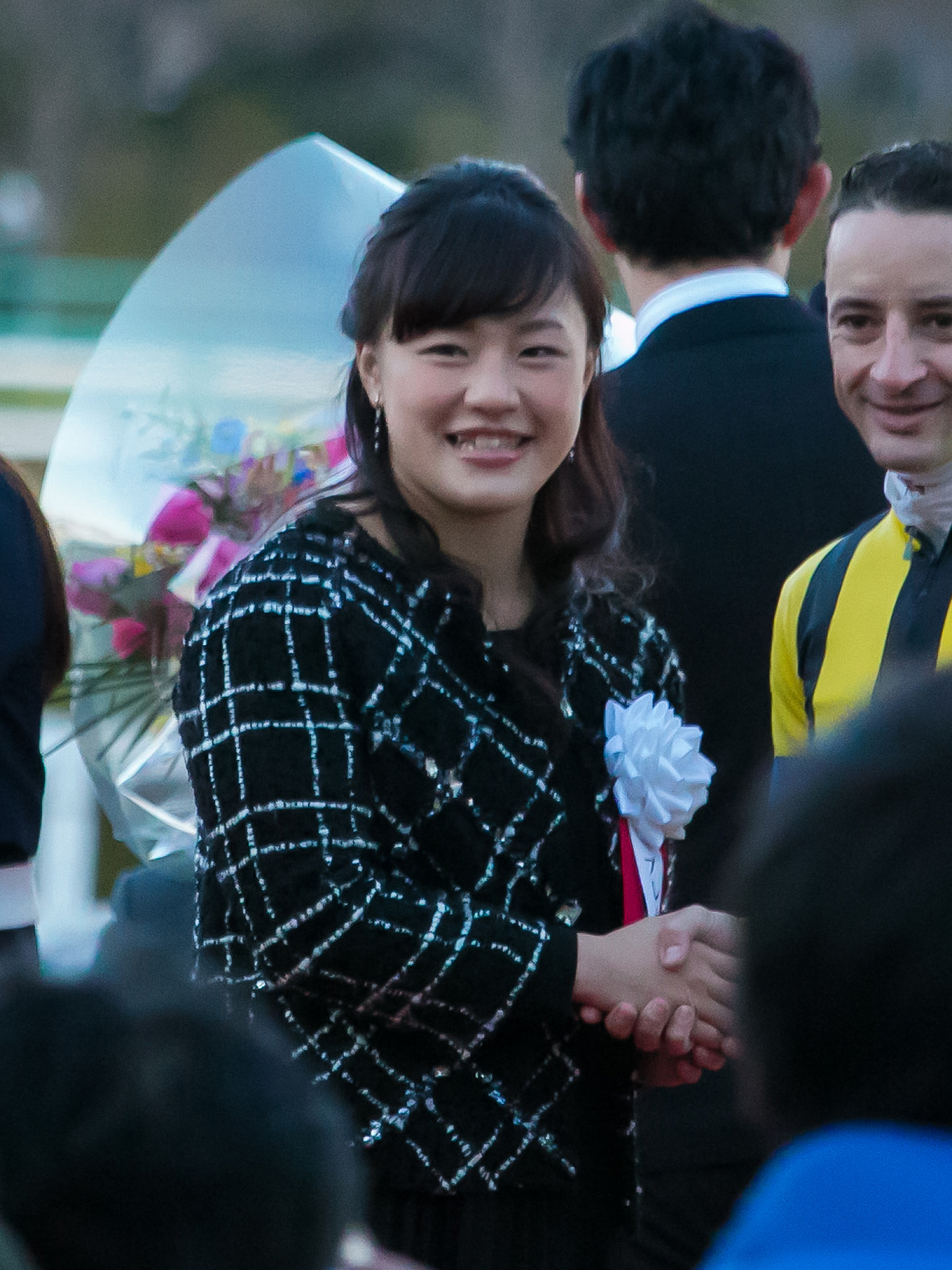
- Tosaka in 2016

Personal information
- Native name: 登坂 絵莉
- Born: 30 August 1993 (age 33) Takaoka, Toyama, Japan
- Height: 152 cm (5 ft 0 in)
- Weight: 48 kg (106 lb)

Sport
- Country: Japan
- Sport: Wrestling
- Event: Freestyle
- College team: Shigakkan University Wrestling Team
- Coached by: Kazuhito Sakae
Medal record
Women's freestyle wrestling
Representing Japan
Olympic Games
Gold medal – first place	2016 Rio de Janeiro	48 kg
World Championships
Gold medal – first place	2015 Las Vegas	48 kg
Gold medal – first place	2014 Tashkent	48 kg
Gold medal – first place	2013 Budapest	48 kg
Silver medal – second place	2012 Strathcona County	48 kg
Asian Championships
Bronze medal – third place	2016 Bangkok	48 kg
Summer Universiade
Gold medal – first place	2013 Kazan	48 kg

Eri Tosaka (登坂 絵莉, Tōsaka Eri; born 30 August 1993) is a Japanese freestyle wrestler.

== Background ==
She competes in the 48 kg division and won the silver medal in the same division at the 2012 World Wrestling Championships. At the 2013 World Wrestling Championships, she won the gold medal after defeating Mayelis Caripá of Venezuela. She also won the gold medal at the 2016 Rio Olympic in the 48 kg division by a 3-2 decision over Mariya Stadnik of Azerbaijan. She was trailing by a point till very late in the match. She was successful in converting a takedown with two seconds remaining on the clock to win the gold medal bout.

She graduated from Shigakkan Uni's Department of health and sports science. In 2016, she went on to Shigakkan University's Graduate school and became a member of the women's wrestling team.

She had started wrestling in elementary school with the Takaoka Junior Class on her father's recommendation who competed and won in the national polity's Greco-Roman wrestling competitions' 48kg weight class.

By the time she entered middle school, she transferred to MIYAHARA GYM run by her father where the members are known to train more intensely. Come her 3rd year, the Takaoka Junior Class began to catch up and practice more intensely too, prompting her to return to the team again. Then, she won the national middle school championship.

After she entered high school, she won twice consecutively at the national high school girls' championship. In her 3rd year, she competed in the All Japan wrestling championship where she defeated Miyu Yamamoto in the 2nd round and advanced to the next round where she lost to Hitomi Obara (both famous female wrestlers).

After enrolling in Shigakkan University, she participated in the Junior Olympics and won in the 51kg weight class, one class higher. At the Wrestling World Cup, her name was included in the list of winning members despite not attending. At the Japanese National Wrestling Championship, she won and was chosen to be a representative of the 48kg weight class.

In 2012, the World Wrestling Championship was held in Strathcona County, Canada, where Tosaka competed against Belarusian Vanessa Kaladzinskaya. During the final competition, the third period ended in a tie when Kaladzinskaya pushed Tosaka out of the ring just before the end of the round, earning a score of 2 to 2. Tosaka's team called for a video replay to check what happen, and it was then announced that the point would go to Tosaka, declaring her the winner. However, Kaladzinskaya 's team then challenged the ruling and noted that she backed Tosaka before she pushed her out of the ring. This then gave Kaladzinskaya the final point and the win, once again overturning the ruling. Normally, participants aren't allowed to challenge the rulings after a match. Even though Mario Saletnig who worked as the head judge for the match recognized this, he lied and stated that Kaladzinskaya's team was the one that challenged the ruling, ignoring protests from Tosaka's team. After that, Tosaka destroyed second year Irie Yuki in the Japanese National Wrestling Championship and won.

In June 2013, she won at the Japanese National Wrestling Championship and was once again selected to be a representative. In July, she also won in Universiade. In September, she proceeded to win favorably at the Wrestling World Championship, and she defeated Venezuelan Mayelis Caripa, avenging herself from her second place finish in the previous tournament.

In 2014, she won the World Cup, and beat Japanese Miyahara who dropped from the 51kg weight class, marking her third consecutive victory. She was then chosen to be a world championship representative. At the World Championship, she beat Polish Iwona Matkowka by a huge difference with a score of 10 to 2, achieving her second consecutive win. Then she went on to the Asian Games where she beat the 2013 51kg weight class world champion Sun Yanan from China with a score of 5 to 1. In December, she achieved her third consecutive win at the Japanese National Wrestling Championship.

In June 2015, she achieved four consecutive wins at the Japanese National Championship, and was chosen to be a representative at the World Championship. In September at the World Championship finals, she went up against London Olympic gold medalist Mariya Stadnik from Azerbaijan. Tosaka was given two points due to an activity time (AT) warning, but was able to tie the score in the last ten seconds with a one-legged tackle. In order to declare a winner from this tie, Stadnik challenged the judge's ruling, saying that the point where she was pushed out of the ring was just one point, but this was not approved. The score became 3 to 2 and Tosaka achieved her third consecutive victory at the World Championship. With this win, as long as she participated in the Japanese National Championship in December, she would be offered to be a representative at the 2016 Olympics in Rio de Janeiro. As a measure against strong foreign athletes, she competed in the 53kg weight class at the Japanese National Championship in December, and competed against third year Irie Nanami from Kyushu Kyoritsu University. While it was a close match, Tosaka won the competition and became an Olympic representative.

In February 2016, she lost 4 to 5 against Sun Yanan at the Asian Championship semifinals for the first time in three and a half years since the 2012 World Championship. Her winning streak ended at 59 wins. In June, she visit the Toyama Prefecture Office and expressed her determination for the Olympics saying " I want to win the gold metal no matter what". On August 17 at the Olympics in Rio, she defeated Kazakhstan's Zhuldyz Eshimova in the second round 6 to 0, American Haley Augello 11 to 2 in the quarterfinals, and China’s Sun Yanan 8 to 3 in the semifinals. In the finals, Azerbaijan's Stadnik had a lead of 2 to 1 until just before the end of the match when Tosaka performed a one-legged tackle, giving her the win at 3 to 2 and earning her the gold medal. In September, she received the Prefectural Honor Award for her performance at the Olympics, and in November, she received the Medal of Honor with a Purple Ribbon.

In January 2017, she made surgery on the big toe of her foot due to an old injury. Because of this, she did not compete later in August as a World Championship Representative. In September, she returned to compete in the National Japanese Women's Open Wrestling Championship after over a year in the 53kg weight class and won. At the National Japanese Wrestling Championship in December, she competed in the new 50kg weight class, but withdrew after winning the quarterfinals in order to not worsen the injuries on her left knee and ankle.

In June of 2018, she lost 2 to 6 at the National Japanese Invitaional Championship against Irie Yuki from the Japan Self-Defense Force's Physical Training School, placing in third. Because of this, she wasn't able to be a World Championship representative. In December, she lost to Irie Yuki in the semifinals at the National Japanese Invitational Championship, finishing in third place.

On June 16, 2019, she competed against Susaki Yui in the 50kg weight class of the National Japanese Invitational Championship semifinals and was defeated. In September of the same year, she lost the chance to compete in the World Championship. in December, she lost 0 to 6 against Susaki in the National Japanese Championship semifinals, and was therefore unable to become a representative for the Tokyo Olympics.

On August 5, 2020, she married mixed martial artist Kuramoto Kazuma.

On August 21, 2021, she announced on social media that she gave birth to her first child, a boy, on August 10 the same year.

On April 1, 2022, it was confirmed that she retired from the front line.

== Personal life ==
Tosaka is married to Kazuma Kuramoto, a Japanese mixed martial artist.

== Championships and accomplishments ==
- Tokyo Sports
  - Wrestling Special Award (2013, 2014, 2015, 2016)
