= 2017 Asian Wrestling Championships – Results =

These are the results of the 2017 Asian Wrestling Championships which took place between 10 May and 14 May 2017 in New Delhi, India.

== Men's freestyle ==
=== 57 kg ===
13 May

Round of 16
Kim Sung-gwon (KOR)	3^{F}
Wu Chin-fu (TPE)	0
Reza Atri (IRI)	8
Makhmudjon Shavkatov (UZB)	6
Pinai Nuyson (THA)	0
Yuki Takahashi (JPN)	12
Zou Wanhao (CHN)	0
Nurislam Sanayev (KAZ)	10
Berdi Atabaýew (TKM)	0
Ri Kum-song (PRK)	6
Dzhamshed Sharifov (TJK)	0
Zandanbudyn Zanabazar (MGL)	13
Ulukbek Zholdoshbekov (KGZ)	6^{F}
Sandeep Tomar (IND)	5

Quarterfinals
Tharindu Priyanath (SRI)	0
Kim Sung-gwon (KOR)	10
Reza Atri (IRI)	2
Yuki Takahashi (JPN)	5
Nurislam Sanayev (KAZ)	3
Ri Kum-song (PRK)	2
Zandanbudyn Zanabazar (MGL)	15
Ulukbek Zholdoshbekov (KGZ)	4

Semifinals
Kim Sung-gwon (KOR)	0
Yuki Takahashi (JPN)	10
Nurislam Sanayev (KAZ)	0
Zandanbudyn Zanabazar (MGL)	8

Final
Yuki Takahashi (JPN)	7
Zandanbudyn Zanabazar (MGL)	1

Repechage round 1
Pinai Nuyson (THA)	0
Reza Atri (IRI)	6^{F}
Dzhamshed Sharifov (TJK)	6
Ulukbek Zholdoshbekov (KGZ)	8

Bronze medals
Reza Atri (IRI)	5
Kim Sung-gwon (KOR)	4
Ulukbek Zholdoshbekov (KGZ)	2
Nurislam Sanayev (KAZ)	7

=== 61 kg ===
14 May

Round of 16
Liu Minghu (CHN)	0
Rei Higuchi (JPN)	9
Charles Fernando (SRI)	0
Harphool Gulia (IND)	11
Tömör-Ochiryn Tulga (MGL)	9
Alibek Osmonov (KGZ)	9
Kim Han-song (PRK)	16
Temurjon Usmonohunov (UZB)	8

Quarterfinals
Abdulqosim Fayziev (TJK)	0
Daulet Niyazbekov (KAZ)	11
Yun Ji-hoon (KOR)	0
Behnam Ehsanpour (IRI)	11
Rei Higuchi (JPN)	7
Harphool Gulia (IND)	6
Alibek Osmonov (KGZ)	0
Kim Han-song (PRK)	11

Semifinals
Daulet Niyazbekov (KAZ)	4
Behnam Ehsanpour (IRI)	9
Rei Higuchi (JPN)	14
Kim Han-song (PRK)	7^{F}

Final
Behnam Ehsanpour (IRI)	8
Kim Han-song (PRK)	6

Repechage round 1
Temurjon Usmonohunov (UZB)	1
Alibek Osmonov (KGZ)	9

Bronze medals
Yun Ji-hoon (KOR)	1
Daulet Niyazbekov (KAZ)	2
Alibek Osmonov (KGZ)	4
Rei Higuchi (JPN)	9

=== 65 kg ===
13 May

Round of 16
Sirojiddin Khasanov (UZB)	3
Bajrang Punia (IND)	4
Meirzhan Ashirov (KAZ)	5
Meisam Nassiri (IRI)	8
Kim Kuk-gwang (PRK)	13
Batsuuriin Naranbold (MGL)	2
Abdulrahman Ibrahim (QAT)	2
Saidzhon Amirdzhon (TJK)	12

Quarterfinals
Masakazu Kamoi (JPN)	11
Adilet Mamataev (KGZ)	4
Chamara Perera (SRI)	0
Lee Seung-chul (KOR)	10
Bajrang Punia (IND)	7
Meisam Nassiri (IRI)	5
Kim Kuk-gwang (PRK)	10
Saidzhon Amirdzhon (TJK)	0

Semifinals
Masakazu Kamoi (JPN)	2
Lee Seung-chul (KOR)	8
Bajrang Punia (IND)	3
Kim Kuk-gwang (PRK)	2

Final
Lee Seung-chul (KOR)	2
Bajrang Punia (IND)	6

Repechage round 1
Sirojiddin Khasanov (UZB)	3
Meisam Nassiri (IRI)	8

Bronze medals
Chamara Perera (SRI)	0
Masakazu Kamoi (JPN)	10
Meisam Nassiri (IRI)	7
Kim Kuk-gwang (PRK)	2

=== 70 kg ===
14 May

Round of 16
Somsak Jindapan (THA)	2
Saman Hettige (SRI)	12
Lee Gun-woo (KOR)	2
Ikhtiyor Navruzov (UZB)	10
Hamed Rashidi (IRI)	10
Luo Yin (CHN)	0

Quarterfinals
Vinod Kumar Omprakash (IND)	2
Momojiro Nakamura (JPN)	12
Akzhurek Tanatarov (KAZ)	12
Davaatserengiin Khatanbaatar (MGL)	1
Gulomdzhon Sharipov (TJK)	10
Saman Hettige (SRI)	0
Ikhtiyor Navruzov (UZB)	9
Hamed Rashidi (IRI)	8

Semifinals
Momojiro Nakamura (JPN)	7
Akzhurek Tanatarov (KAZ)	11
Gulomdzhon Sharipov (TJK)	4
Ikhtiyor Navruzov (UZB)	9

Final
Akzhurek Tanatarov (KAZ)	11
Ikhtiyor Navruzov (UZB)	7

Repechage round 1
Lee Gun-woo (KOR)	0
Hamed Rashidi (IRI)	10

Bronze medals
Davaatserengiin Khatanbaatar (MGL)	1
Momojiro Nakamura (JPN)	11
Hamed Rashidi (IRI)	10
Gulomdzhon Sharipov (TJK)	0

=== 74 kg ===
13 May

Round of 16
Galymzhan Usserbayev (KAZ)	8
Gong Byung-min (KOR)	10
Bahman Teymouri (IRI)	5
Muslim Evloev (KGZ)	5
Tsubasa Asai (JPN)	10
Padipat Wantawong (THA)	0
Şähergeldi Saparmyradow (TKM)	0
Jitender Kumar (IND)	7

Quarterfinals
Ganboldyn Törbold (MGL)	5
Zhang Chongyao (CHN)	10
Bekzod Abdurakhmonov (UZB)	4^{F}
Panadurage Fernando (SRI)	0
Gong Byung-min (KOR)	4
Muslim Evloev (KGZ)	6
Tsubasa Asai (JPN)	8
Jitender Kumar (IND)	7

Semifinals
Zhang Chongyao (CHN)	0
Bekzod Abdurakhmonov (UZB)	11
Muslim Evloev (KGZ)	6
Tsubasa Asai (JPN)	2

Final
Bekzod Abdurakhmonov (UZB)	6
Muslim Evloev (KGZ)	0

Repechage round 1
Bahman Teymouri (IRI)	12
Gong Byung-min (KOR)	2

Bronze medals
Panadurage Fernando (SRI)	0
Zhang Chongyao (CHN)	4^{F}
Bahman Teymouri (IRI)	10
Tsubasa Asai (JPN)	0

=== 86 kg ===
14 May

Round of 16
Wang Shao-wen (TPE)	10
Lasantha Priyankara (SRI)	0
Heng Vuthy (CAM)	0
Umidjon Ismanov (UZB)	4^{F}
Nairisiga (CHN)	0
Alireza Karimi (IRI)	11
Somveer Kadian (IND)	0
Kim Gwan-uk (KOR)	11
Saiakbai Usupov (KGZ)	6
Bakhodur Kadirov (TJK)	10
Masao Matsusaka (JPN)	2
Pürevjavyn Önörbat (MGL)	3

Quarterfinals
Azamat Dauletbekov (KAZ)	10
Aşot Maşurýan (TKM)	0
Wang Shao-wen (TPE)	0
Umidjon Ismanov (UZB)	4^{F}
Alireza Karimi (IRI)	7
Kim Gwan-uk (KOR)	0
Bakhodur Kadirov (TJK)	0
Pürevjavyn Önörbat (MGL)	4

Semifinals
Azamat Dauletbekov (KAZ)	9
Umidjon Ismanov (UZB)	8
Alireza Karimi (IRI)	11
Pürevjavyn Önörbat (MGL)	0

Final
Azamat Dauletbekov (KAZ)	1
Alireza Karimi (IRI)	12

Repechage round 1
Nairisiga (CHN)	0
Kim Gwan-uk (KOR)	4^{F}

Bronze medals
Aşot Maşurýan (TKM)	1
Umidjon Ismanov (UZB)	6^{F}
Kim Gwan-uk (KOR)	6
Pürevjavyn Önörbat (MGL)	7

=== 97 kg ===
13 May

Round of 16
Magomed Musaev (KGZ)	12
Ekkapong Jannee (THA)	0
Yeraly Abdrashev (KAZ)	4
Qing Gelebaya (CHN)	3
Satyawart Kadian (IND)	2
Magomed Ibragimov (UZB)	2
Ölziisaikhany Batzul (MGL)	10
Dilan Rangana Gedara (SRI)	0

Quarterfinals
Seo Min-won (KOR)	0
Hossein Shahbazi (IRI)	10
Naoya Akaguma (JPN)	12
Rustam Iskandari (TJK)	2
Magomed Musaev (KGZ)	7
Yeraly Abdrashev (KAZ)	0
Magomed Ibragimov (UZB)	10
Ölziisaikhany Batzul (MGL)	5

Semifinals
Hossein Shahbazi (IRI)	6
Naoya Akaguma (JPN)	2
Magomed Musaev (KGZ)	1
Magomed Ibragimov (UZB)	3

Final
Hossein Shahbazi (IRI)	4
Magomed Ibragimov (UZB)	6

Repechage round 1
Satyawart Kadian (IND)	5
Ölziisaikhany Batzul (MGL)	8

Bronze medals
Seo Min-won (KOR)	4
Naoya Akaguma (JPN)	3
Ölziisaikhany Batzul (MGL)	2
Magomed Musaev (KGZ)	7

=== 125 kg ===
14 May

Round of 16
Shang Hai (CHN)	0
Yadollah Mohebbi (IRI)	11
Yermukambet Inkar (KAZ)	6
Natsagsürengiin Zolboo (MGL)	12

Quarterfinals
Farkhod Anakulov (TJK)	9
Sardorbek Kholmatov (UZB)	2
Sumit Malik (IND)	6
Taiki Yamamoto (JPN)	3
Aibek Kasmanbetov (KGZ)	0
Nam Kyung-jin (KOR)	7
Yadollah Mohebbi (IRI)	5
Natsagsürengiin Zolboo (MGL)	1

Semifinals
Farkhod Anakulov (TJK)	2
Sumit Malik (IND)	7
Nam Kyung-jin (KOR)	8
Yadollah Mohebbi (IRI)	8^{F}

Final
Sumit Malik (IND)	2
Yadollah Mohebbi (IRI)	6

Repechage round 1
Shang Hai (CHN)	0
Natsagsürengiin Zolboo (MGL)	10

Bronze medals
Taiki Yamamoto (JPN)	8
Farkhod Anakulov (TJK)	2
Natsagsürengiin Zolboo (MGL)	5^{F}
Nam Kyung-jin (KOR)	2

== Men's Greco-Roman ==
=== 59 kg ===
11 May

Round of 16
Firuz Tukhtaev (UZB)	8
Ritisak Pravan (THA)	0
Ruzador Dzhuganiev (TJK)	1
Saman Abdevali (IRI)	3
Gyanender Dahiya (IND)	1
Kaly Sulaimanov (KGZ)	5
Lee Han-eul (KOR)	3
Kenichiro Fumita (JPN)	5

Quarterfinals
Meirambek Ainagulov (KAZ)	9
Ri Sin-myong (PRK)	0
Lin Yu-hung (TPE)	6
Jiang Li (CHN)	15
Firuz Tukhtaev (UZB)	1
Saman Abdevali (IRI)	2
Kaly Sulaimanov (KGZ)	2
Kenichiro Fumita (JPN)	11^{F}

Semifinals
Meirambek Ainagulov (KAZ)	9
Jiang Li (CHN)	0
Saman Abdevali (IRI)	4
Kenichiro Fumita (JPN)	9

Final
Meirambek Ainagulov (KAZ)	1
Kenichiro Fumita (JPN)	2

Repechage round 1
Lee Han-eul (KOR)	7
Kaly Sulaimanov (KGZ)	7

Bronze medals
Ri Sin-myong (PRK)	5
Jiang Li (CHN)	2
Kaly Sulaimanov (KGZ)	2
Saman Abdevali (IRI)	5

=== 66 kg ===
10 May

Round of 16
Pang Jin-chol (PRK)	0
Ali Arsalan (IRI)	2
Oh Sang-hun (KOR)	10
Hung Ying-hua (TPE)	1
Nurbek Abduganiev (KGZ)	1
Elmurat Tasmuradov (UZB)	2

Quarterfinals
Dong Jinxin (CHN)	0
Almat Kebispayev (KAZ)	8
Shogo Takahashi (JPN)	11
Jakkit Butjamrual (THA)	0
Ravinder Singh (IND)	3
Ali Arsalan (IRI)	5
Oh Sang-hun (KOR)	4
Elmurat Tasmuradov (UZB)	3

Semifinals
Almat Kebispayev (KAZ)	6
Shogo Takahashi (JPN)	4
Ali Arsalan (IRI)	5
Oh Sang-hun (KOR)	9

Final
Almat Kebispayev (KAZ)	1
Oh Sang-hun (KOR)	1

Repechage round 1
Hung Ying-hua (TPE)	0
Elmurat Tasmuradov (UZB)	6^{F}

Bronze medals
Dong Jinxin (CHN)	2
Shogo Takahashi (JPN)	1
Elmurat Tasmuradov (UZB)	1
Ali Arsalan (IRI)	11^{F}

=== 71 kg ===
11 May

Round of 16
Abunassyr Omirzak (KAZ)	2
Kim Ji-hun (KOR)	3
Fazliddin Nomozov (UZB)	8
Suhrob Hojiev (TJK)	0

Quarterfinals
Deepak Kumar (IND)	1
Afshin Biabangard (IRI)	3
Nurgazy Asangulov (KGZ)	10
Zhang Hujun (CHN)	5
Takeshi Izumi (JPN)	9
Peerapol Sirithong (THA)	0
Kim Ji-hun (KOR)	6
Fazliddin Nomozov (UZB)	5

Semifinals
Afshin Biabangard (IRI)	5
Nurgazy Asangulov (KGZ)	4
Takeshi Izumi (JPN)	2
Kim Ji-hun (KOR)	1

Final
Afshin Biabangard (IRI)	1
Takeshi Izumi (JPN)	2

Bronze medals
Deepak Kumar (IND)	1
Nurgazy Asangulov (KGZ)	8
Peerapol Sirithong (THA)	0
Kim Ji-hun (KOR)	8

=== 75 kg ===
10 May

Round of 16
Gurpreet Singh (IND)	6
Dilshod Turdiev (UZB)	4
Burgo Beishaliev (KGZ)	0
Maxat Yerezhepov (KAZ)	5
Yang Bin (CHN)	8
Bakhit Sharif Badr (QAT)	0
Rabbia Khalil (PLE)	0
Pejman Poshtam (IRI)	8

Quarterfinals
Rai Hayashi (JPN)	4
Bakhtovar Khasanov (TJK)	12
Park Dae-seung (KOR)	10
Chen Yu-ching (TPE)	0
Gurpreet Singh (IND)	6
Maxat Yerezhepov (KAZ)	8
Yang Bin (CHN)	2
Pejman Poshtam (IRI)	2

Semifinals
Bakhtovar Khasanov (TJK)	0
Park Dae-seung (KOR)	8
Maxat Yerezhepov (KAZ)	6
Yang Bin (CHN)	1

Final
Park Dae-seung (KOR)	0
Maxat Yerezhepov (KAZ)	5

Repechage round 1
Burgo Beishaliev (KGZ)	0
Gurpreet Singh (IND)	4

Bronze medals
Chen Yu-ching (TPE)	0
Bakhtovar Khasanov (TJK)	8
Gurpreet Singh (IND)	0
Yang Bin (CHN)	8

=== 80 kg ===
10 May

Round of 16
Harpreet Singh Sandhu (IND)	2
Yuya Maeta (JPN)	1

Quarterfinals
Daniyal Gadzhiyev (KAZ)	9
Sukhrob Abdulkhaev (TJK)	0
Samat Shirdakov (KGZ)	0
Ramin Taheri (IRI)	8
Jonibek Otabekov (UZB)	1
Na Junjie (CHN)	2
Kim June-hyoung (KOR)	8
Harpreet Singh Sandhu (IND)	0

Semifinals
Daniyal Gadzhiyev (KAZ)	1
Ramin Taheri (IRI)	3
Na Junjie (CHN)	1
Kim June-hyoung (KOR)	2

Final
Ramin Taheri (IRI)	3
Kim June-hyoung (KOR)	1

Bronze medals
Samat Shirdakov (KGZ)	2
Daniyal Gadzhiyev (KAZ)	2
Harpreet Singh Sandhu (IND)	3
Na Junjie (CHN)	2

=== 85 kg ===
11 May

Round of 16
Hossein Nouri (IRI)	6
Kang Nae-koo (KOR)	0
Thawatchai Phatho (THA)	0
Peng Fei (CHN)	9

Quarterfinals
Atsushi Matsumoto (JPN)	7
Anil Kumar (IND)	0
Muhammadali Shamsiddinov (UZB)	9
Kao Ming-hung (TPE)	0
Askat Beishebekov (KGZ)	3
Azamat Kustubayev (KAZ)	5
Hossein Nouri (IRI)	5
Peng Fei (CHN)	2

Semifinals
Atsushi Matsumoto (JPN)	11
Muhammadali Shamsiddinov (UZB)	4
Azamat Kustubayev (KAZ)	2
Hossein Nouri (IRI)	3

Final
Atsushi Matsumoto (JPN)	2
Hossein Nouri (IRI)	4

Repechage round 1
Kang Nae-koo (KOR)	1
Peng Fei (CHN)	9

Bronze medals
Anil Kumar (IND)	7
Muhammadali Shamsiddinov (UZB)	6
Peng Fei (CHN)	2
Azamat Kustubayev (KAZ)	1

=== 98 kg ===
10 May

Round of 16
Yerulan Iskakov (KAZ)	1
Mostafa Salehizadeh (IRI)	7

Quarterfinals
Kim Seung-jun (KOR)	8
Azizdzhon Zaripov (TJK)	0
Rustam Assakalov (UZB)	6^{F}
Yuta Nara (JPN)	0
Chinnawet Kanchalee (THA)	0
Xiao Di (CHN)	8
Hardeep Singh (IND)	0
Mostafa Salehizadeh (IRI)	5

Semifinals
Kim Seung-jun (KOR)	2
Rustam Assakalov (UZB)	0
Xiao Di (CHN)	0
Mostafa Salehizadeh (IRI)	2

Final
Kim Seung-jun (KOR)	4
Mostafa Salehizadeh (IRI)	14

Repechage round 1
Yerulan Iskakov (KAZ)	9
Hardeep Singh (IND)	0

Bronze medals
Azizdzhon Zaripov (TJK)	0
Rustam Assakalov (UZB)	8^{F}
Yerulan Iskakov (KAZ)	5
Xiao Di (CHN)	1

=== 130 kg ===
10 May

Quarterfinals		Semifinals		Final
		Damir Kuzembayev (KAZ)	2
Muminjon Abdullaev (UZB)	2	Muminjon Abdullaev (UZB)	2
Naveen Sevlia (IND)	1			Damir Kuzembayev (KAZ)	1
Sun He (CHN)	4			Behnam Mehdizadeh (IRI)	3
Arata Sonoda (JPN)	4	Arata Sonoda (JPN)	0
Behnam Mehdizadeh (IRI)	3	Behnam Mehdizadeh (IRI)	9
Kim Min-seok (KOR)	1

Bronze medals
Bye
Muminjon Abdullaev (UZB)
Kim Min-seok (KOR)	4^{F}
Arata Sonoda (JPN)	2

== Women's freestyle ==
=== 48 kg ===
12 May

Round of 16
Manlika Esati (THA)	WO
Shriyanthika Niroshani (SRI)
Sun Yanan (CHN)	11
Phạm Thị Hà Phương (VIE)	0
Yui Susaki (JPN)	10
Dauletbike Yakhshimuratova (UZB)	0
Erdenesükhiin Narangerel (MGL)	4
Ritu Phogat (IND)	11
Chang Yu-syuan (TPE)	0
Kim Yeo-jin (KOR)	4^{F}

Quarterfinals
Kim Son-hyang (PRK)	10
Saiana Baiyzova (KGZ)	0
Irina Borissova (KAZ)	10
Manlika Esati (THA)	0
Sun Yanan (CHN)	4
Yui Susaki (JPN)	9
Ritu Phogat (IND)	10
Kim Yeo-jin (KOR)	0

Semifinals
Kim Son-hyang (PRK)	10
Irina Borissova (KAZ)	0
Yui Susaki (JPN)	9
Ritu Phogat (IND)	0

Final
Kim Son-hyang (PRK)	0
Yui Susaki (JPN)	10

Repechage round 1
Dauletbike Yakhshimuratova (UZB)	0
Sun Yanan (CHN)	10

Bronze medals
Saiana Baiyzova (KGZ)	4
Irina Borissova (KAZ)	10
Sun Yanan (CHN)
Ritu Phogat (IND)	WO

=== 53 kg ===
12 May

Round of 16
Davaasükhiin Otgontsetseg (MGL)	4
Jong Myong-suk (PRK)	5
Anusha Kumari (SRI)
Mayu Mukaida (JPN)	WO
Pang Qianyu (CHN)	5^{F}
Rozalia Tilegenova (KGZ)	0
Vũ Thị Hằng (VIE)	1
Pinki (IND)	6^{F}

Quarterfinals
Chiu Hsin-ju (TPE)	1
Zhuldyz Eshimova (KAZ)	12
Kim Hyung-joo (KOR)	3
Shakhodat Djullibaeva (UZB)	0
Jong Myong-suk (PRK)	0
Mayu Mukaida (JPN)	10
Pang Qianyu (CHN)	10
Pinki (IND)	0

Semifinals
Zhuldyz Eshimova (KAZ)	3^{F}
Kim Hyung-joo (KOR)	4
Mayu Mukaida (JPN)	2
Pang Qianyu (CHN)	0

Final
Zhuldyz Eshimova (KAZ)	0
Mayu Mukaida (JPN)	10^{F}

Repechage round 1
Anusha Kumari (SRI)
Jong Myong-suk (PRK)	WO

Bronze medals
Chiu Hsin-ju (TPE)	0
Kim Hyung-joo (KOR)	8
Jong Myong-suk (PRK)	8
Pang Qianyu (CHN)	1

=== 55 kg ===
12 May

Round of 16
Nazira Marsbek Kyzy (KGZ)	0
Zhang Qi (CHN)	6
Marina Sedneva (KAZ)	10
Lo Szu-chieh (TPE)	0

Quarterfinals
Lee Shin-hye (KOR)	8^{F}
Kiều Thị Ly (VIE)	1
Sae Nanjo (JPN)	9
Erkhembayaryn Davaachimeg (MGL)	0
Vinesh Phogat (IND)	10
Sevara Eshmuratova (UZB)	0
Zhang Qi (CHN)	12
Marina Sedneva (KAZ)	1

Semifinals
Lee Shin-hye (KOR)	0
Sae Nanjo (JPN)	10
Vinesh Phogat (IND)	4
Zhang Qi (CHN)	0

Final
Sae Nanjo (JPN)	8
Vinesh Phogat (IND)	4

Bronze medals
Erkhembayaryn Davaachimeg (MGL)	4
Lee Shin-hye (KOR)	0
Sevara Eshmuratova (UZB)	0
Zhang Qi (CHN)	10

=== 58 kg ===
13 May

Round of 16
Katsuki Sakagami (JPN)	4^{F}
Um Ji-eun (KOR)	0
Jong In-sun (PRK)	5
Enkhbatyn Gantuyaa (MGL)	4

Quarterfinals
Asem Seydametova (UZB)	0
Sarita Mor (IND)	10
Deepika Dilhani (SRI)	0
Đào Thị Hương (VIE)	10
Aisuluu Tynybekova (KGZ)	10
Gulshaharat Talassova (KAZ)	0
Katsuki Sakagami (JPN)	6
Jong In-sun (PRK)	2

Semifinals
Sarita Mor (IND)	12
Đào Thị Hương (VIE)	0
Aisuluu Tynybekova (KGZ)	6^{F}
Katsuki Sakagami (JPN)	4

Final
Sarita Mor (IND)	0
Aisuluu Tynybekova (KGZ)	6

Bronze medals
Asem Seydametova (UZB)	0
Đào Thị Hương (VIE)	7
Gulshaharat Talassova (KAZ)	0
Katsuki Sakagami (JPN)	10

=== 60 kg ===
12 May

Quarterfinals		Semifinals		Final
Risako Kawai (JPN)	10
Zhou Zhangting (CHN)	0	Risako Kawai (JPN)	10
Baatarjavyn Shoovdor (MGL)	10	Baatarjavyn Shoovdor (MGL)	0
Nguyễn Thị Vinh (VIE)	0			Risako Kawai (JPN)	10
Ayaulym Kassymova (KAZ)	4			Sakshi Malik (IND)	0
Kim Kyeong-eun (KOR)	0	Ayaulym Kassymova (KAZ)	3
Sakshi Malik (IND)	6	Sakshi Malik (IND)	15
Nabira Esenbaeva (UZB)	2

Bronze medals
Zhou Zhangting (CHN)	15
Baatarjavyn Shoovdor (MGL)	12
Nabira Esenbaeva (UZB)	3
Ayaulym Kassymova (KAZ)	13

=== 63 kg ===
11 May

Round of 16
Nellya Gyulnazaryan (KAZ)	0
Ayana Gempei (JPN)	10

Quarterfinals
Soronzonboldyn Battsetseg (MGL)	4^{F}
Hang Jin-young (KOR)	0
Ritu Malik (IND)	5
Hou Min-wen (TPE)	4
Khalbazar Narbaeva (UZB)	0
Ri Yun-sim (PRK)	11
Wang Xiaoqian (CHN)	8
Ayana Gempei (JPN)	14

Semifinals
Soronzonboldyn Battsetseg (MGL)	12^{F}
Ritu Malik (IND)	2
Ri Yun-sim (PRK)	0
Ayana Gempei (JPN)	6

Final
Soronzonboldyn Battsetseg (MGL)	7^{F}
Ayana Gempei (JPN)	2

Repechage round 1
Nellya Gyulnazaryan (KAZ)	0
Wang Xiaoqian (CHN)	8^{F}

Bronze medals
Hang Jin-young (KOR)	1
Ritu Malik (IND)	1
Wang Xiaoqian (CHN)	6
Ri Yun-sim (PRK)	5

=== 69 kg ===
12 May

Quarterfinals		Semifinals		Final
Sharkhüügiin Tümentsetseg (MGL)	2
Zhou Feng (CHN)	8	Zhou Feng (CHN)	7
Sara Dosho (JPN)	3	Sara Dosho (JPN)	7
Elmira Syzdykova (KAZ)	1			Sara Dosho (JPN)	8^{F}
Huang Chen-chi (TPE)	0			Divya Kakran (IND)	0
Divya Kakran (IND)	2^{F}	Divya Kakran (IND)	12
Park Hyeon-yeong (KOR)	6^{F}	Park Hyeon-yeong (KOR)	4
Bakhtigul Baltaniyazova (UZB)	0

Bronze medals
Elmira Syzdykova (KAZ)	2
Zhou Feng (CHN)	7^{F}
Huang Chen-chi (TPE)	0
Park Hyeon-yeong (KOR)	8^{F}

=== 75 kg ===
11 May

Quarterfinals		Semifinals		Final
		Masako Furuichi (JPN)	10
Jyoti (IND)	5	Jyoti (IND)	0
Jeong Seo-yeon (KOR)	1			Masako Furuichi (JPN)	1
Gan-Ochiryn Urtnasan (MGL)	10			Paliha (CHN)	8
Nilufar Gadaeva (UZB)	0	Gan-Ochiryn Urtnasan (MGL)	2
Gulmaral Yerkebayeva (KAZ)	2	Paliha (CHN)	4^{F}
Paliha (CHN)	8

Bronze medals
Bye
Jyoti (IND)
Gulmaral Yerkebayeva (KAZ)	4^{F}
Gan-Ochiryn Urtnasan (MGL)	0
