= Yevloyev =

Yevloyev or Evloev is an Ingush surname. People with the surname include:

- Movsar Evloev (born 1994), Russian mixed martial artist
- Musa Evloev (born 1993), Russian Greco-Roman wrestler
- Muslim Evloev (1995-2020), Russian-Kyrgyz freestyle wrestler
- Magomed Yevloyev (1971-2008), Russian-Ingush journalist
- Zurab Yevloyev (born 1980), Russian footballer
