= Satyawart Kadian =

Indian freestyle wrestler

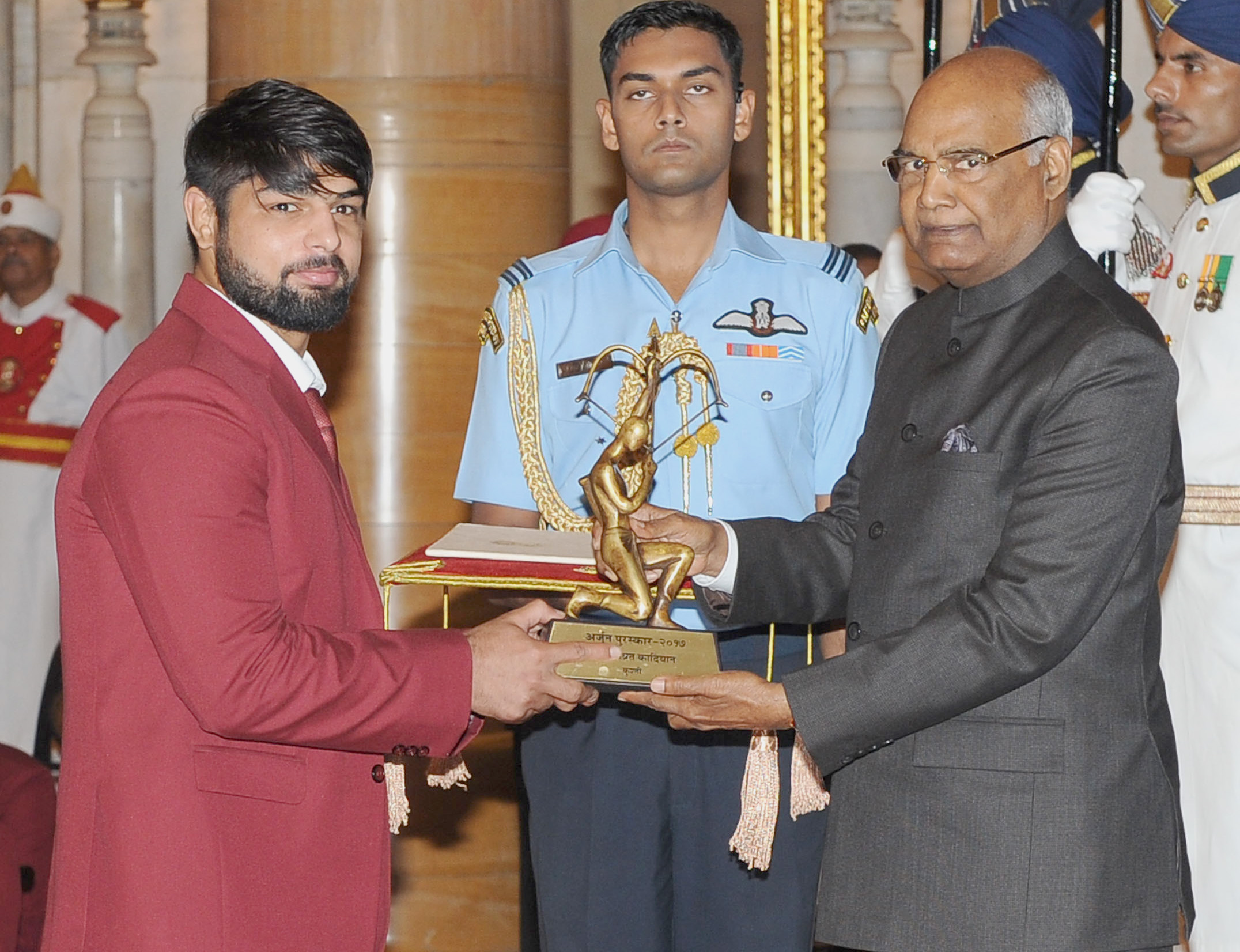
- Kadian (left) receiving the Arjuna Award in 2017

Personal information
- Nationality: Indian
- Born: 9 November 1993 (age 32) Majra, Haryana, India
- Height: 5 ft 11 in (1.80 m)
- Weight: 97 kg (214 lb)
- Spouse: Sakshi Malik

Sport
- Sport: Freestyle wrestling
- Event: 97 kg
Medal record
Representing India
Men's Freestyle Wrestling
Commonwealth Games
Silver medal – second place	2014 Glasgow	97 kg
Asian Championships
Bronze medal – third place	2014 Astana	97 kg
Bronze medal – third place	2019 Xi'an	97 kg
Bronze medal – third place	2021 Almaty	97 kg
Silver medal – second place	2022 Ulaanbaatar	97 kg
Commonwealth Championships
Gold medal – first place	2016 Singapore	97 kg
World Junior Championships
Bronze medal – third place	2013 Sofia	96 kg
Youth Olympic Games
Bronze medal – third place	2010 Singapore	100 kg

Satyawart Kadian (born 9 November 1993) is an Indian wrestler. He first represented India at the inaugural 2010 Youth Olympics where he won a bronze medal in the boys' freestyle 100 kg category. He then represented India in the 2014 Commonwealth Games and won a silver medal in the 97 kg weight class.

== Personal life ==
Kadian was born in Majra village of present-day Jhajjar district, Haryana. At the age of 6 years, he shifted to Rohtak where his father had a wrestling school. He is the son of Satyawan Kadian, an Arjuna Awardee and 1988 Summer Olympics Olympian. Having trained in the akhada run by his father, he broke into the national camp in 2012 after a stellar performance at the 2012 Nationals in Gonda, Uttar Pradesh. In 2014, Chief coach Vinod Kumar, who was a teammate of his father's during the 1988 Olympics, was confident that Kadian competing in a higher weight category would ensure him medals. "It is rare for us to get a wrestler who is competing for medals regularly in the higher weight divisions. We are very lucky to have Satyawart. And the best part is he is only 20 years old. If we keep working on him we are sure he will become one of the mainstays of this team in the years to come."

Satyawart dreams of emulating Olympic wrestler Sushil Kumar in the future.

He is married to Sakshi Malik - another freestyle female wrestler who has represented India at multiple international competitions.

== Career ==
=== 2010 Youth Olympic Games ===
Kadian's first major medal at an international event was when he won the bronze medal in the boys' freestyle 100 kg category at the debut Youth Olympics in Singapore, announcing himself to the Indian wrestling community and to the world.

=== 2013 World Junior Wrestling Championships ===
Kadian rose to prominence in the 2013 World Youth Wrestling Championships in Sofia, Bulgaria when he became the only Indian wrestler to return home with a medal, albeit the bronze one. It was a tough road for the Indian to the semis, having beaten an Iranian and a Kazakh to line up against Viktor Kazishvili of the United States of America. The young wrestler was unable to overcome the American and came up against Ali Bonceoglu of Turkey in the bronze medal match where he succeeded in overcoming the wily Turkish wrestler.

Battling an ankle injury during the semi-final and bronze medal bouts, Kadian said his motivation to win a meal was the lean returns from the wrestling contingent. "The first few days were not good for us. We didn't win a medal in freestyle and Greco-Roman. I wanted to end this barren spell and win a medal at any cost. After the first round I felt in good form. In the bronze-medal match I desperately wanted to register a victory," said the 18 year old in an interview with the Times of India.

In the build-up to the tournament, Kadian trained with Olympic medallists Sushil Kumar and Yogeshwar Dutt at the senior national wrestling camp in Sonepat. Raj Singh, the then secretary general of the Wrestling Federation of India, attributed Kadian's success in Sofia to his eagerness to learn and easy interaction with senior wrestlers.

=== 2014 Asian Wrestling Championships ===
Kadian's first foray into the senior wrestling team earned him immediate rewards. His Round of 16 match-up was against Umidjon Ismanov of Uzbekistan whom he beat 7-3 in the first period itself. He then lost to Magomed Musaev of Kyrgyzstan 3-0 but qualified for the repechage round to face Chanuk Yook of South Korea whom he beat 7-0 in a thumping contest. In the bronze medal match, he was able to overcome Alihan Djumaev of Kazakhstan and won the bronze medal, beating the Kazakh grappler 6-6, with the Indian winning because of last point scored.

=== 2014 Commonwealth Games ===
Competing in the 97 kg weight class, Kadian's first opponent was Manjula Uduwila Arachchige of Sri Lanka, beating him 4-0 in the Round of 16. He faced Soso Tamarau of Nigeria in the quarter-finals and won 3-1 in a close match. Reaching the semi-finals, Kadian was up against home favourite Leon Rattigan of England whom he closed out with an easy 3-1 win. The finals bout was an exciting clash against Arjun Gill of Canada where the Indian disappointingly lost 1-3 to settle for the silver medal.

=== 2014 Asian Games ===
Kadian continued to compete in the 97 kg weight class and began his Asian Games campaign with a match-up against Magomed Musaev of Kyrgyzstan, losing 1-3 in the first round itself. He was able to redeem himself in the repêchage round, beating his opponent Bilal Hussain Awad of Pakistan 4-0 there. That pushed him into the bronze medal match where he lost 3-0 to Mamed Ibragimov of Kazakhstan.

=== Other events ===
==== Rustam-e-International Dangal Wrestling tournament ====
In honour of the Indian festival of Navratri, the 1st Rustam-e-International tournament was held in Katra, Jammu and ended on 22 October 2015. Participants from England, Belarus and Ukraine competed in the tournament which took place in the Vivekanand Stadium in Katra.

Kadian was the 3rd Indian wrestler taking part in the tournament along with Binia Bin and Parvindra. The latter wrestlers beat Ukrainian wrestler Myhailo Datsenko and English wrestler Leon Rattigan respectively, whom Kadian had beaten last year at the 2014 Commonwealth Games. The 21 year old won the title along with a cash prize, a trophy belt and a medal, beating Belarusian wrestler Ihor Didyk.
