= 2016 Wrestling World Cup – Men's Greco-Roman =

Men's Greco-Roman at the 2016 Wrestling World Cup
- Venue: Shahid Dastgheib Stadium
- Location: Shiraz, Iran
- Dates: 19–20 May

Medalists
gold medal	Iran
silver medal	Russia
bronze medal	Turkey

The 2016 Wrestling World Cup - Men's Greco-Roman was the first of a set of three FILA Wrestling World Cups in 2016. Will be held in Shiraz, Iran at the Shahid Dastgheib Stadium On May 19 to May 20, 2016.

== Pool stage ==
Team competes for 1st place
Team competes for 3rd place
Team competes for 5th place
Team competes for 7th place

=== Pool A ===
Team	Pld	W	L
Russia	3	3	0
Kazakhstan	3	2	1
Belarus	2	1	2
Germany	2	0	3

POOL A
Round I

Russia 7 - 1 Belarus
Weight	Russia	result	Belarus
59 kg	Sergey Emelin	8 – 0	Elbek Tazhyieu
66 kg	Zaur Kabaloev	8 – 0	Nikita Zinevich
71 kg	Abuyazid Mantsigov	7 – 3	Pavel Liakh
75 kg	Irakli Kalandiya	7 – 4	Tsimur Berdyev
80 kg	Alan Igorevitch Khugaev	16 – 8	Pavel Paminchuk
85 kg	Sosruko Kodzokov	7 – 0	Hoha Hahnidze
98 kg	Kantemir Magomedov	2 – 6	Sergey Starodub
130 kg	'Sergey Semenov	4 – 2	Georgi Chuhashvili

Kazakhstan 5 - 3 Germany
Weight	Kazakhstan	result	Germany
59 kg	Ruslan Itemgenov	0 – 5	Dustin Scherf
66 kg	Askhat Zhanbirov	9 – 0	Muhammet Yeter
71 kg	Darkhan Bayakhmetov	2 – 1	Maximilian Schwabe
75 kg	Miras Barshylykov	11 – 2	Jan Rotter
80 kg	Askhat Dilmukhamedov	2 – 0	Hannes Wagner
85 kg	Khussein Mutsolgov	1 – 3	Florian Neumaier
98 kg	Alimkhan Syzdykov	2 – 11	Muhammed Sever
130 kg	Nurmakhan Tinaliyev	4^{F} – 0	Christian John

Round II

Russia 7 - 1 Germany
Weight	Russia	result	Germany
59 kg	Zhanbolat Lokaev	5 – 0	Dustin Scherf
66 kg	Azamat Akhmedov	7 – 4	Muhammet Yeter
71 kg	Denis Murtazin	2 – 0	Maximilian Schwabe
75 kg	Irakli Kalandiya	9 – 3	Jan Rotter
80 kg	Ramazan Abacharaev	8 – 0	Hannes Wagner
85 kg	Imil Sharafetdinov	3 – 0	Florian Neumaier
98 kg	Aleksander Golovin	2 – 3	Muhammed Sever
130 kg	Zurabi Gedekhauri	4 – 3	Christian John

Belarus 3 - 5 Kazakhstan
Weight	Belarus	result	Kazakhstan
59 kg	Elbek Tazhyieu	0 – 8	Mirambek Ainagulov
66 kg	Nikita Zinevich	2 – 10	Askhat Zhanbirov
71 kg	Pavel Liakh	4 – 1	Aibek Yensekhanov
75 kg	Tsimur Berdyev	0 – 8	Doszhan Kartikov
80 kg	Pavel Paminchuk	1 – 4	Askhat Dilmukhamedov
85 kg	Hoha Hahnidze	13 – 4	Khussein Mutsolgov
98 kg	Sergey Starodub	9 – 4	Zhanarbek Kabdolov
130 kg	Georgi Chuhashvili	0 – 3	Damir Kuzembayev

Round III

Russia 7 - 1 Kazakhstan
Weight	Russia	result	Kazakhstan
59 kg	Sergey Emelin	9 – 0	Mirambek Ainagulov
66 kg	Zaur Kabaloev	9 – 0	Askhat Zhanbirov
71 kg	Abuyazid Mantsigov	5 – 2	Darkhan Bayakhmetov
75 kg	Irakli Kalandiya	0 – 3	Doszhan Kartikov
80 kg	Alan Igorevitch Khugaev	4^{F} – 3	Askhat Dilmukhamedov
85 kg	Sosruko Kodzokov	5 – 0	Khussein Mutsolgov
98 kg	Kantemir Magomedov	8 – 0	Zhanarbek Kabdolov
130 kg	'Sergey Semenov	3 – 2	Nurmakhan Tinaliyev

Belarus 6 - 2 Germany
Weight	Belarus	result	Germany
59 kg	Elbek Tazhyieu	0 – 3	Dustin Scherf
66 kg	Nikita Zinevich	4 – 2	Muhammet Yeter
71 kg	Pavel Liakh	0 – 5	Maximilian Schwabe
75 kg	Tsimur Berdyev	8 – 0	Jan Rotter
80 kg	Pavel Paminchuk	4 – 0	Hannes Wagner
85 kg	Hoha Hahnidze	5 – 0	Florian Neumaier
98 kg	Sergey Starodub	4 – 0	Muhammed Sever
130 kg	Georgi Chuhashvili	8 – 0	Christian John

=== Pool B ===
Team	Pld	W	L
Iran	3	3	0
Turkey	3	2	1
Azerbaijan	3	1	2
Ukraine	3	0	3

POOL B
Round I

Turkey 5 - 3 Azerbaijan
Weight	Turkey	result	Azerbaijan
59 kg	Fatih Üçüncü	1 – 2	Taleh Mammadov
66 kg	Abdulsamet Günal	9 – 0	Elman Mukhtarov
71 kg	Selçuk Gürsel	0 – 9	Rustam Aliyev
75 kg	Furkan Bayrak	7 – 4	Shamistan Guluzade
80 kg	Burhan Akbudak	9 – 7	Emin Ahmadov
85 kg	İldem Kansu	0 – 5	Islam Abbasov
98 kg	Fatih Başköy	2 – 0	Orkhan Nuriyev
130 kg	Atilla Güzel	2 – 0	Oyan Nazariani

Iran 8 - 0 Ukraine
Weight	Iran	result	Ukraine
59 kg	Mehrdad Mardani	7 – 3	Ievgen Miagkyi
66 kg	Mehdi Zeidvand	8 – 0	Artur Politaev
71 kg	Afshin Biabangard	8 – 0	Olexandr Lytvynov
75 kg	Saeed Abdevali	9 – 0	Ievgen Pyshkov
80 kg	Ramin Taheri	1 – 1	Yaroslav Filchakov
85 kg	Habibollah Akhlaghi	6 – 0	Oleksandr Shyshman
98 kg	Ghasem Rezaei	9 – 1	Zelimkhan Dzigasov
130 kg	Bashir Babajanzadeh	4 – 0	Igor Didyk

Round II

Iran 7 - 1 Azerbaijan
Weight	Iran	result	Azerbaijan
59 kg	Saman Abdevali	3 – 1	Sakit Guliev
66 kg	Omid Norouzi	8 – 0	Azad Aliyev
71 kg	Afshin Biabangard	4 – 0	Ruhin Mikhailov
75 kg	Payam Bouyeri	8 – 0	Shamistan Guluzade
80 kg	Yousef Ghaderian	5 – 0	Emin Ahmadov
85 kg	Hossein Nouri	4 – 6	Islam Abbasov
98 kg	Mehdi Aliyari	8 – 0	Turman Eyubov
130 kg	Behnam Mehdizadeh	3 – 2	Oyan Nazariani

Turkey 6 - 2 Ukraine
Weight	Turkey	result	Ukraine
59 kg	Şerif Kılıç	9 – 0	Ievgen Miagkyi
66 kg	Enes Başar	6^{F} – 0	Artur Politaev
71 kg	Murat Dağ	6 – 2	Olexandr Lytvynov
75 kg	Yunus Emre Başar	7 – 4	Ievgen Pyshkov
80 kg	Doğan Göktaş	2 – 4	Yaroslav Filchakov
85 kg	İldem Kansu	1 – 2	Andrii Gladkykh
98 kg	Doğan Yılmaz	3 – 0	Zelimkhan Dzigasov
130 kg	Atilla Güzel	8^{F} – 0	Vladislav Voronin

Round III

Azerbaijan 5 - 3 Ukraine
Weight	Azerbaijan	result	Ukraine
59 kg	Taleh Mammadov	4 – 2	Ievgen Miagkyi
66 kg	Azad Aliyev	8 – 3	Artur Politaev
71 kg	Ruhin Mikhailov	2 – 0	Olexandr Lytvynov
75 kg	'Rustam Aliyev	3 – 0	Ievgen Pyshkov
80 kg	Emin Ahmadov	2 – 4	Yaroslav Filchakov
85 kg	Islam Abbasov	1 – 3	Oleksandr Shyshman
98 kg	Orkhan Nuriyev	2 – 0	Zelimkhan Dzigasov
130 kg	Oyan Nazariani	2 – 4	Igor Didyk

Iran 7 - 1 Turkey
Weight	Iran	result	Turkey
59 kg	Mehrdad Mardani	8 – 0	Şerif Kılıç
66 kg	Mehdi Zeidvand	10 – 1	Abdulsamet Günal
71 kg	Azim Garmsiri	5 – 1	Selçuk Gürsel
75 kg	Saeed Abdevali	8 – 0	Osman Köse
80 kg	Ramin Taheri	4 – 0	Doğan Göktaş
85 kg	Hossein Nouri	3 – 0	İldem Kansu
98 kg	Mehdi Aliyari	2 – 4	Doğan Yılmaz
130 kg	Bashir Babajanzadeh	8 – 0	Ali Nail Arslan

== Medal Matches ==
Medal Matches
First-Place Match

Iran 8 - 0 Russia
Weight	Iran	result	Russia
59 kg	Saman Abdevali	2 – 1	Sergey Emelin
66 kg	Omid Norouzi	7 – 2	Zaur Kabaloev
71 kg	Afshin Biabangard	3 – 2	Abuyazid Mantsigov
75 kg	Saeed Abdevali	0^{R} – 0	Irakli Kalandiya
80 kg	Ramin Taheri	6 – 4	Ramazan Abacharaev
85 kg	Habibollah Akhlaghi	3 – 0	Sosruko Kodzokov
98 kg	Ghasem Rezaei	2 – 1	Kantemir Magomedov
130 kg	Bashir Babajanzadeh	7 – 2	Sergey Semenov

Third-Place Match

Turkey 4 df - 4 Kazakhstan
Weight	Turkey	result	Kazakhstan
59 kg	Fatih Üçüncü	3 – 0	Mirambek Ainagulov
66 kg	Enes Başar	0 – 3	Askhat Zhanbirov
71 kg	Murat Dağ	2 – 3	Darkhan Bayakhmetov
75 kg	Furkan Bayrak	0 – 2	Doszhan Kartikov
80 kg	Burhan Akbudak	8 – 0	Askhat Dilmukhamedov
85 kg	İldem Kansu	5 – 2	Khussein Mutsolgov
98 kg	Fatih Başköy	10 – 2	Alimkhan Syzdykov
130 kg	Atilla Güzel	4 – 6	Nurmakhan Tinaliyev

Fifth-Place Match

Belarus 4.df - 4 Azerbaijan
Weight	Belarus	result	Azerbaijan
59 kg	Elbek Tazhyieu	0 – 8	Sakit Guliev
66 kg	Nikita Zinevich	0 – 9	Elman Mukhtarov
71 kg	Pavel Liakh	4 – 1	Ruhin Mikhailov
75 kg	Tsimur Berdyev	4^{F} – 0	Shamistan Guluzade
80 kg	Pavel Paminchuk	1 – 0	Emin Ahmadov
85 kg	Hoha Hahnidze	2 – 3	Islam Abbasov
98 kg	Sergey Starodub	5 – 2	Orkhan Nuriyev
130 kg	Georgi Chuhashvili	7 – 8	Oyan Nazariani

Seventh-Place Match

Ukraine 5 - 3 Germany
Weight	Ukraine	result	Germany
59 kg	Ievgen Miagkyi	8 – 0	Dustin Scherf
66 kg	Artur Politaev	8 – 0	Muhammet Yeter
71 kg	Olexandr Lytvynov	2 – 11	Maximilian Schwabe
75 kg	Ievgen Pyshkov	1 – 4	Jan Rotter
80 kg	Yaroslav Filchakov	5 – 0	Hannes Wagner
85 kg	Andrii Gladkykh	2 – 1	Florian Neumaier
98 kg	Zelimkhan Dzigasov	0 – 9	Muhammed Sever
130 kg	Igor Didyk	11 – 0	Christian John

== Final classement ==
Team	Pld	W	L
Iran	4	4	0
Russia	4	3	1
Turkey	4	3	1
Kazakhstan	4	2	2
Belarus	4	2	2
Azerbaijan	4	1	3
Ukraine	4	1	3
Germany	4	0	4

== See also ==
- 2016 Wrestling World Cup - Men's freestyle
- 2016 World wrestling clubs Cup - Men's freestyle
