= 2012 European Juniors Wrestling Championships =

- Host city: Croatia, Zagreb
- Dates: June 19–24, 2012

Champions
- Freestyle: Russia
- Greco-Roman: Russia
- Women: Russia

The 2012 European Juniors Wrestling Championships was held in Zagreb, Croatia between June 19–24, 2012.

== Medal table ==
* Host nation (Croatia)

Rank	Nation	Gold	Silver	Bronze	Total
1	Russia	9	3	3	15
2	Azerbaijan	4	3	7	14
3	Turkey	2	4	5	11
4	Germany	2	1	1	4
5	Belarus	1	4	3	8
6	Armenia	1	2	1	4
7	Bulgaria	1	1	1	3
8	Sweden	1	0	1	2
9	Croatia*	1	0	0	1
9	Estonia	1	0	0	1
9	Finland	1	0	0	1
12	Moldova	0	1	5	6
12	Ukraine	0	1	5	6
14	Georgia	0	1	3	4
14	Poland	0	1	3	4
16	France	0	1	1	2
17	Norway	0	1	0	1
18	Romania	0	0	5	5
19	Greece	0	0	1	1
19	Hungary	0	0	1	1
19	Israel	0	0	1	1
19	Lithuania	0	0	1	1
Totals (22 entries)		24	24	48	96

== Team ranking ==
Rank	Men's freestyle		Men's Greco-Roman		Women's freestyle	
Rank	Team	Points	Team	Points	Team	Points
1	Russia	67	Russia	61	Russia	43
2	Azerbaijan	56	Azerbaijan	49	Turkey	42
3	Turkey	47	Turkey	48	Romania	38
4	Ukraine	36	Georgia	40	Ukraine	37
5	Armenia	35	Germany	31	Belarus	36

== Medal summary ==
=== Men's freestyle ===
Event	Gold	Silver	Bronze
50 kg	(Russia) Aldar Balzhinimayev	(Germany) Marc Luithle	(Belarus) Mahsad Hasanau
50 kg	(Russia) Aldar Balzhinimayev	(Germany) Marc Luithle	(Ukraine) Armen Arakeliyan
55 kg	(Azerbaijan) Galib Aliyev	(Armenia) Artak Hovhannisyan	(Russia) Said Gazimagomedov
55 kg	(Azerbaijan) Galib Aliyev	(Armenia) Artak Hovhannisyan	(Romania) Raul Donu
60 kg	(Azerbaijan) Akhmednabi Gvarzatilov	(Turkey) Selahattin Kılıçsallayan	(Russia) Bulat Batoev
60 kg	(Azerbaijan) Akhmednabi Gvarzatilov	(Turkey) Selahattin Kılıçsallayan	(Armenia) Valodya Frangulyan
66 kg	(Turkey) Mustafa Kaya	(Armenia) Davit Apoyan	(Germany) Kevin Henkel
66 kg	(Turkey) Mustafa Kaya	(Armenia) Davit Apoyan	(Ukraine) Ivan Petriv
74 kg	(Russia) Atsamaz Sanakoev	(Turkey) Abdulkadir Özmen	(Georgia (country)) Jumber Kvelashvili
74 kg	(Russia) Atsamaz Sanakoev	(Turkey) Abdulkadir Özmen	(Azerbaijan) Eljan Usubzadev
84 kg	(Belarus) Aliaksandr Hushtyn	(Russia) Albert Tsipinov	(Azerbaijan) Parviz Akhundov
84 kg	(Belarus) Aliaksandr Hushtyn	(Russia) Albert Tsipinov	(Moldova) Evgheni Eremiev
96 kg	(Russia) Magomedkamil Guseynov	(Belarus) Dzmitry Harbunou	(Turkey) Ali Bönceoğlu
96 kg	(Russia) Magomedkamil Guseynov	(Belarus) Dzmitry Harbunou	(Azerbaijan) Said Gamidov
120 kg	(Azerbaijan) Ali Magomedabirov	(Russia) Vitaliy Gagiev	(Greece) Viktor Svetlichkin
120 kg	(Azerbaijan) Ali Magomedabirov	(Russia) Vitaliy Gagiev	(Turkey) Hamza Özkaradeniz

=== Men's Greco-Roman ===
Event	Gold	Silver	Bronze
50 kg	(Turkey) Tolgahan Karataş	(Russia) Artur Labazanov	(Israel) Andriy Tsaryuk
50 kg	(Turkey) Tolgahan Karataş	(Russia) Artur Labazanov	(Azerbaijan) Murad Bazarov
55 kg	(Armenia) Gevorg Gharibyan	(Azerbaijan) Sakit Guliyev	(France) Yasin Özay
55 kg	(Armenia) Gevorg Gharibyan	(Azerbaijan) Sakit Guliyev	(Moldova) Victor Ciobanu
60 kg	(Russia) Artur Suleymanov	(Belarus) Andrei Pikuza	(Lithuania) Ramunas Dagys
60 kg	(Russia) Artur Suleymanov	(Belarus) Andrei Pikuza	(Moldova) Maxim Mamulat
66 kg	(Croatia) Dominik Etlinger	(Azerbaijan) Jeyhun Aliyev	(Poland) Michal Kosla
66 kg	(Croatia) Dominik Etlinger	(Azerbaijan) Jeyhun Aliyev	(Ukraine) Dmytro Pynkov
74 kg	(Russia) Islam Charaev	(Belarus) Kazbek Kilou	(Poland) Arkadiusz Kułynycz
74 kg	(Russia) Islam Charaev	(Belarus) Kazbek Kilou	(Azerbaijan) Shamil Ertuganov
84 kg	(Russia) Sosruko Kodzokov	(Bulgaria) Nikolay Dobrev	(Georgia (country)) Robert Kobliashvili
84 kg	(Russia) Sosruko Kodzokov	(Bulgaria) Nikolay Dobrev	(Azerbaijan) Fuad Aliyev
96 kg	(Russia) Musa Evloev	(Norway) Felix Baldauf	(Turkey) Süleyman Demirci
96 kg	(Russia) Musa Evloev	(Norway) Felix Baldauf	(Georgia (country)) Iakobi Kajaia
120 kg	(Germany) John Christian	(Georgia (country)) Levan Arabuli	(Turkey) Ali Nail Arslan
120 kg	(Germany) John Christian	(Georgia (country)) Levan Arabuli	(Hungary) Bálint Lám

=== Women's freestyle ===
Event	Gold	Silver	Bronze
44 kg	(Sweden) Josefine Frederiksen	(Turkey) Evin Demirhan	(Romania) Madalina Lingurar
44 kg	(Sweden) Josefine Frederiksen	(Turkey) Evin Demirhan	(Moldova) Emilia Budeanu
48 kg	(Azerbaijan) Kamala Aliyeva	(Moldova) Doina Roscovanu	(Russia) Milana Dadasheva
48 kg	(Azerbaijan) Kamala Aliyeva	(Moldova) Doina Roscovanu	(Turkey) Büşra Kenger
51 kg	(Germany) Nina Hemmer	(Azerbaijan) Patimat Bagomedova	(Moldova) Elena Turcan
51 kg	(Germany) Nina Hemmer	(Azerbaijan) Patimat Bagomedova	(Romania) Simona Pricop
55 kg	(Finland) Petra Olli	(Poland) Karolina Krawczyk	(Azerbaijan) Yarina Dubovska
55 kg	(Finland) Petra Olli	(Poland) Karolina Krawczyk	(Belarus) Zalina Sidakova
59 kg	(Bulgaria) Mimi Hristova	(Turkey) Hafize Şahin	(Sweden) Lisa Holgersson
59 kg	(Bulgaria) Mimi Hristova	(Turkey) Hafize Şahin	(Belarus) Krystina Tsan
63 kg	(Russia) Maria Lulkova	(Belarus) Maria Mamashuk	(Romania) Laura Gavriliuc
63 kg	(Russia) Maria Lulkova	(Belarus) Maria Mamashuk	(Ukraine) Tetyana Lavrenchuk
67 kg	(Russia) Svetlana Babushkina	(Ukraine) Karyna Stankova	(Poland) Daria Osocka
67 kg	(Russia) Svetlana Babushkina	(Ukraine) Karyna Stankova	(Bulgaria) Dzhanan Manolova
72 kg	(Estonia) Epp Mäe	(France) Cynthia Vescan	(Romania) Denisa Macovei
72 kg	(Estonia) Epp Mäe	(France) Cynthia Vescan	(Ukraine) Yuliya Lavrenyuk
