= 2017 World Wrestling Championships – Men's Greco-Roman 85 kg =

Men's Greco-Roman 85 kg at the 2017 World Championships
- Venue: AccorHotels Arena
- Dates: 21 August 2017
- Competitors: 34 from 34 nations

Medalists
gold medal	Metehan Başar	Turkey
silver medal	Denis Kudla	Germany
bronze medal	Hossein Nouri	Iran
bronze medal	Roberti Kobliashvili	Georgia

The men's Greco-Roman 85 kilograms is a competition featured at the 2017 World Wrestling Championships, and was held in Paris, France on 21 August 2017.

== Results ==
Legend

- C — Won by 3 cautions given to the opponent
- F — Won by fall
- WO — Won by walkover

=== Finals ===
Semifinals		Final
Hossein Nouri (IRI)	1
Denis Kudla (GER)	4	Denis Kudla (GER)	1
Davit Chakvetadze (RUS)	2	Metehan Başar (TUR)	2
Metehan Başar (TUR)	4

=== Top half ===
==== Section 1 ====
Round of 64

Round of 32
Viktor Lőrincz (HUN)	8
Ravinder Khatri (IND)	0
Ben Provisor (USA)	2
Oleksandr Shyshman (UKR)	6
Hossein Nouri (IRI)	7
Eividas Stankevičius (LTU)	5
Valid Deschiyev (FRA)	0
Eerik Aps (EST)	2

Round of 16
Viktor Lőrincz (HUN)	4
Oleksandr Shyshman (UKR)	0
Hossein Nouri (IRI)	3
Eerik Aps (EST)	1

Quarterfinals
Viktor Lőrincz (HUN)	4
Hossein Nouri (IRI)	6

==== Section 2 ====
Round of 64

Round of 32
Hou Shuai (CHN)	1
Denis Kudla (GER)	3
Ivan Huklek (CRO)	2
Daniel Grégorich (CUB)	5^{F}
Atsushi Matsumoto (JPN)	4
Fabio Parisi (ITA)	1
Ricardo Cárdenas (PER)	1
Islam Abbasov (AZE)	7^{C}

Round of 16
Denis Kudla (GER)	2
Daniel Grégorich (CUB)	2
Atsushi Matsumoto (JPN)	1
Islam Abbasov (AZE)	4

Quarterfinals
Denis Kudla (GER)	4
Islam Abbasov (AZE)	1

=== Bottom half ===
==== Section 3 ====
Round of 64

Round of 32
Davit Chakvetadze (RUS)	3
Ahmed Othman (EGY)	0
Adem Boudjemline (ALG)	2
Zakarias Berg (SWE)	4
Azamat Kustubayev (KAZ)	2
Dorin Pârvan (ROU)	1
Carlos Muñoz (COL)	9
Kao Ming-hung (TPE)	0

Round of 16
Davit Chakvetadze (RUS)	5
Zakarias Berg (SWE)	2
Azamat Kustubayev (KAZ)	2
Carlos Muñoz (COL)	0

Quarterfinals
Davit Chakvetadze (RUS)	4
Azamat Kustubayev (KAZ)	1

==== Section 4 ====
Round of 64
Javid Hamzatau (BLR)	0
Metehan Başar (TUR)	7
Park Je-woo (KOR)	0
Artur Shahinyan (ARM)	8

Round of 32
Nikolaj Dobrev (SRB)	1
Tadeusz Michalik (POL)	2
Roberti Kobliashvili (GEO)	2
Amer Hrustanović (AUT)	1
Azat Beishebekov (KGZ)	1
Metehan Başar (TUR)	4
Artur Shahinyan (ARM)	1
Nikolay Bayryakov (BUL)	2

Round of 16
Tadeusz Michalik (POL)	0
Roberti Kobliashvili (GEO)	4
Metehan Başar (TUR)	4
Nikolay Bayryakov (BUL)	1

Quarterfinals
Roberti Kobliashvili (GEO)	2
Metehan Başar (TUR)	4

=== Repechage ===
Repechage round 1
Javid Hamzatau (BLR)	1
Azat Beishebekov (KGZ)	3

Repechage round 2
Hou Shuai (CHN)	0
Daniel Grégorich (CUB)	4
Azat Beishebekov (KGZ)	1
Nikolay Bayryakov (BUL)	4

Repechage round 3
Daniel Grégorich (CUB)	2
Islam Abbasov (AZE)	2
Nikolay Bayryakov (BUL)	1
Roberti Kobliashvili (GEO)	2

Bronze medals
Islam Abbasov (AZE)	0
Hossein Nouri (IRI)	4
Roberti Kobliashvili (GEO)	WO
Davit Chakvetadze (RUS)
