= 2021 World Wrestling Championships – Men's Greco-Roman 87 kg =

Wrestling competitions

Men's Greco-Roman 87 kg at the 2021 World Championships
- Venue: Nye Jordal Amfi
- Dates: 9–10 October 2021
- Competitors: 25 from 25 nations

Medalists
| gold medal | Kiryl Maskevich | Belarus |
| silver medal | Lasha Gobadze | Georgia |
| bronze medal | Turpal Bisultanov | Denmark |
| bronze medal | Arkadiusz Kułynycz | Poland |

The men's Greco-Roman 87 kilograms is a competition featured at the 2021 World Wrestling Championships, and was held in Oslo, Norway on 9 and 10 October.

This Greco-Roman wrestling competition consists of a single-elimination tournament, with a repechage used to determine the winner of two bronze medals. The two finalists face off for gold and silver medals. Each wrestler who loses to one of the two finalists moves into the repechage, culminating in a pair of bronze medal matches featuring the semifinal losers each facing the remaining repechage opponent from their half of the bracket.

On 21 November 2025, The Anti-doping Section of the Court of Arbitration for Sport ruled that the gold medalist Zurabi Datunashvili violated anti-doping rules by using a prohibited method and falsification and sentenced him to 5 years of ineligibility and disqualification of all results since 27 May 2021. Datunashvili's appeal was rejected by the Court of Arbitration for Sport and he was stripped of his medals.

== Results ==
Legend

- F — Won by fall

=== Final ===
| Final |
| Zurabi Datunashvili (SRB) | 9 |
| Kiryl Maskevich (BLR) | 1 |

=== Top half ===
Round of 32
Turpal Bisultanov (DEN) | 8
Alan Vera (USA) | 0
Mihail Bradu (MDA) | 2
Ramin Taheri (IRI) | 3
Julius Matuzevičius (LTU) | 1
Artur Shahinyan (ARM) | 5

Round of 16
Zurabi Datunashvili (SRB) | 4
Milad Alirzaev (RWF) | 3
Islam Abbasov (AZE) | 0
Lasha Gobadze (GEO) | 11
Turpal Bisultanov (DEN) | 3
Ramin Taheri (IRI) | 1
Artur Shahinyan (ARM) | 7
Daniel Vicente (MEX) | 0

Quarterfinals
Zurabi Datunashvili (SRB) | 2
Lasha Gobadze (GEO) | 1
Turpal Bisultanov (DEN) | 5^{F}
Artur Shahinyan (ARM) | 0

Semifinals
Zurabi Datunashvili (SRB) | 5
Turpal Bisultanov (DEN) | 1

=== Bottom half ===
Round of 32
Takahiro Tsuruda (JPN) | 1
Arkadiusz Kułynycz (POL) | 4
Ruben Been (NOR) | 1
Vjekoslav Luburić (CRO) | 3
Metehan Başar (TUR) | 3
Raido Liitmäe (EST) | 1
Yoan Dimitrov (BUL) | 7
Lee Seung-hwan (KOR) | 0
Zakarias Berg (SWE) | 7
Sunil Kumar (IND) | 3
Iurii Shkriuba (UKR) | 0
Nursultan Tursynov (KAZ) | 10

Round of 16
Kiryl Maskevich (BLR) | 7
Arkadiusz Kułynycz (POL) | 5
Vjekoslav Luburić (CRO) | 1
Metehan Başar (TUR) | 1
Yoan Dimitrov (BUL) | 1
Zakarias Berg (SWE) | 11
Nursultan Tursynov (KAZ) | 1
István Takács (HUN) | 3

Quarterfinals
Kiryl Maskevich (BLR) | 8
Metehan Başar (TUR) | 0
Zakarias Berg (SWE) | 1
István Takács (HUN) | 3

Semifinals
Kiryl Maskevich (BLR) | 12^{F}
István Takács (HUN) | 6

=== Repechage ===
Repechage round 2
Milad Alirzaev (RWF) | 3
Lasha Gobadze (GEO) | 5
Arkadiusz Kułynycz (POL) | 6
Metehan Başar (TUR) | 1

Bronze medals
Lasha Gobadze (GEO) | 5
Turpal Bisultanov (DEN) | 2
Arkadiusz Kułynycz (POL) | 5^{F}
István Takács (HUN) | 2

== Final standing ==
| Rank | Athlete |
|---|---|
| 1st place, gold medalist(s) | Kiryl Maskevich (BLR) |
| 2nd place, silver medalist(s) | Lasha Gobadze (GEO) |
| 3rd place, bronze medalist(s) | Turpal Bisultanov (DEN) |
| 3rd place, bronze medalist(s) | Arkadiusz Kułynycz (POL) |
| 5 | István Takács (HUN) |
| 6 | Zakarias Berg (SWE) |
| 7 | Metehan Başar (TUR) |
| 8 | Artur Shahinyan (ARM) |
| 9 | Nursultan Tursynov (KAZ) |
| 10 | Yoan Dimitrov (BUL) |
| 11 | Vjekoslav Luburić (CRO) |
| 12 | Ramin Taheri (IRI) |
| 13 | Milad Alirzaev (RWF) |
| 14 | Sunil Kumar (IND) |
| 15 | Mihail Bradu (MDA) |
| 16 | Ruben Been (NOR) |
| 17 | Raido Liitmäe (EST) |
| 18 | Takahiro Tsuruda (JPN) |
| 19 | Julius Matuzevičius (LTU) |
| 20 | Daniel Vicente (MEX) |
| 21 | Lee Seung-hwan (KOR) |
| 22 | Alan Vera (USA) |
| 23 | Iurii Shkriuba (UKR) |
| 24 | Islam Abbasov (AZE) |
| DQ | Zurabi Datunashvili (SRB) |

- Zurabi Datunashvili of Serbia originally won the gold medal, but was disqualified in 2025 for an anti-doping violation.
