= Azamat Akhmedov =

Russian Greco-Roman wrestler

Азамат Ахмедов Azamat Akhmedov
Personal information
- Native name: Russian: Азамат Гаджимурадович Ахмедов; Kumyk: Гьажимурадны уланы Азамат;
- Full name: Azamat Gadjimuradovich Akhmedov
- Born: 10 October 1990 (age 35) Kandauraul, Khasavyurtovsky District, Dagestan, Russia

Sport
- Country: Russia
- Sport: Wrestling
- Weight class: 67 kg
- Rank: International Master of sports
- Event: Greco-Roman
- Club: Victoria WC (Tarko-Sale, YNAO)
- Coached by: Aleksey Fomin; Geidar Mamedaliyev
Medal record
Men's Greco-Roman
Representing Russia
World Cup
Silver medal – second place	2016 Shiraz	Team

Azamat Gadjimuradovich Akhmedov (Russian: Азамат Гаджимурадович Ахмедов, Kumyk: Гьажимурадны уланы Азамат, romanized: Hajimuradnı ulanı Azamat; born 11 October 1990) is a Russian Greco-Roman wrestler of Kumyk descent ethnicity, who claimed the silver medal at the 2016 World Cup and the 2024 Russian Championships.

== Background ==
Akhmedov was born on October 10, 1990, into a Kumyk family. He started Greco-Roman wrestling in the local sport club "Victoria" as a child. He currently lives and trains in Yekaterinburg under Olympic silver medalist Geidar Mamedaliyev.

== Sport career ==
Azamat received six bronze medals at the Russian national championships. In 2014, he was finalist of the German Grand Prix. In 2016, he took the silver medal from the 2016 World Cup held in Iran as a Russian team member. In 2017, he won the Haparanda Cup held in Sweden. During 2018, he was first at the Sassari tournament in Italy, Grand Prix of Spain and third at the Ivan Poddubny Tournament at 67 kilos. In 2022, he won the Russian cup. In 2024, he took second place at the Russian Championships.

== Achievements ==
- 2014, 2015, 2017, 2018, 2020, 2021 Russian championships — 3rd;
- 2017 Haparanda Cup — 1st;
- 2018 Ivan Poddubny Tournament — 3rd;
- 2018, 2019, 2022 Sassari tournament — 1st;
- 2022 Russian cup — 1st;
- 2024 Russian championships — 2nd;

== Personal life ==
He is a graduate of the Ural Federal University.
