= 2014 Asian Wrestling Championships =

- Host city: Astana, Kazakhstan
- Dates: 23–27 April 2014
- Stadium: Daulet Sport Complex

Champions
- Freestyle: Iran
- Greco-Roman: Kazakhstan
- Women: Japan

The 2014 Asian Wrestling Championships was held at the Daulet Sport Complex in Astana, Kazakhstan. The event took place from April 23 to April 27, 2014.

== Medal table ==
Rank	Nation	Gold	Silver	Bronze	Total
1	Iran	7	1	3	11
2	Kazakhstan	5	2	7	14
3	Japan	3	3	7	13
4	Kyrgyzstan	2	3	4	9
5	China	2	2	6	10
6	South Korea	2	0	4	6
7	Mongolia	1	7	4	12
8	Uzbekistan	1	1	4	6
9	North Korea	1	1	3	5
10	Tajikistan	0	2	1	3
11	India	0	1	5	6
12	Vietnam	0	1	0	1
Totals (12 entries)		24	24	48	96

== Team ranking ==
Rank	Men's freestyle		Men's Greco-Roman		Women's freestyle	
Rank	Team	Points	Team	Points	Team	Points
1	Iran	70	Kazakhstan	63	Japan	66
2	Mongolia	63	Kyrgyzstan	57	China	64
3	Kazakhstan	51	Iran	53	Mongolia	57
4	Uzbekistan	41	South Korea	52	Kazakhstan	54
5	Japan	40	Uzbekistan	51	India	39
6	Kyrgyzstan	37	Japan	40	Vietnam	37
7	Tajikistan	32	China	39	Uzbekistan	33
8	India	29	India	30	North Korea	32
9	China	28	Tajikistan	23	Kyrgyzstan	26
10	South Korea	19	North Korea	12	Chinese Taipei	20

== Medal summary ==
=== Men's freestyle ===
Event	Gold	Silver	Bronze
57 kg	Rassul Kaliyev; Kazakhstan	Damdinbazaryn Tsogtbaatar; Mongolia	Samat Nadyrbek Uulu; Kyrgyzstan
57 kg	Rassul Kaliyev; Kazakhstan	Damdinbazaryn Tsogtbaatar; Mongolia	Fumitaka Morishita; Japan
61 kg	Masoud Esmaeilpour; Iran	Bajrang Punia; India	Daulet Niyazbekov; Kazakhstan
61 kg	Masoud Esmaeilpour; Iran	Bajrang Punia; India	Narmandakhyn Lkhamgarmaa; Mongolia
65 kg	Ahmad Mohammadi; Iran	Kang Jin-hyok; North Korea	Furkat Farmanov; Uzbekistan
65 kg	Ahmad Mohammadi; Iran	Kang Jin-hyok; North Korea	Batchuluuny Batmagnai; Mongolia
70 kg	Mostafa Hosseinkhani; Iran	Somirsho Vokhidov; Tajikistan	Ken Hosaka; Japan
70 kg	Mostafa Hosseinkhani; Iran	Somirsho Vokhidov; Tajikistan	Ikhtiyor Navruzov; Uzbekistan
74 kg	Reza Afzali; Iran	Pürevjavyn Önörbat; Mongolia	Ryoichi Yamanaka; Japan
74 kg	Reza Afzali; Iran	Pürevjavyn Önörbat; Mongolia	Innokenti Innokentev; Kyrgyzstan
86 kg	Meisam Mostafa-Jokar; Iran	Aslan Kakhidze; Kazakhstan	Orgodolyn Üitümen; Mongolia
86 kg	Meisam Mostafa-Jokar; Iran	Aslan Kakhidze; Kazakhstan	Rashid Kurbanov; Uzbekistan
97 kg	Dorjkhandyn Khüderbulga; Mongolia	Magomed Musaev; Kyrgyzstan	Rustam Iskandari; Tajikistan
97 kg	Dorjkhandyn Khüderbulga; Mongolia	Magomed Musaev; Kyrgyzstan	Satyawart Kadian; India
125 kg	Komeil Ghasemi; Iran	Natsagsürengiin Zolboo; Mongolia	Shang Hai; China
125 kg	Komeil Ghasemi; Iran	Natsagsürengiin Zolboo; Mongolia	Daulet Shabanbay; Kazakhstan

=== Men's Greco-Roman ===
Event	Gold	Silver	Bronze
59 kg	Elmurat Tasmuradov; Uzbekistan	Shinobu Ota; Japan	Yun Won-chol; North Korea
59 kg	Elmurat Tasmuradov; Uzbekistan	Shinobu Ota; Japan	Kanybek Zholchubekov; Kyrgyzstan
66 kg	Ruslan Tsarev; Kyrgyzstan	Khusrav Obloberdiev; Tajikistan	Aibek Yensekhanov; Kazakhstan
66 kg	Ruslan Tsarev; Kyrgyzstan	Khusrav Obloberdiev; Tajikistan	Ryu Han-su; South Korea
71 kg	Jung Ji-hyun; South Korea	Maxat Yerezhepov; Kazakhstan	Krishan Kant Yadav; India
71 kg	Jung Ji-hyun; South Korea	Maxat Yerezhepov; Kazakhstan	Zhang Ridong; China
75 kg	Kim Hyeon-woo; South Korea	Takehiro Kanakubo; Japan	Saeid Abdevali; Iran
75 kg	Kim Hyeon-woo; South Korea	Takehiro Kanakubo; Japan	Yang Bin; China
80 kg	Janarbek Kenjeev; Kyrgyzstan	Yousef Ghaderian; Iran	Kim June-hyoung; South Korea
80 kg	Janarbek Kenjeev; Kyrgyzstan	Yousef Ghaderian; Iran	Azamat Kustubayev; Kazakhstan
85 kg	Nursultan Tursynov; Kazakhstan	Rustam Assakalov; Uzbekistan	Manoj Kumar; India
85 kg	Nursultan Tursynov; Kazakhstan	Rustam Assakalov; Uzbekistan	Mojtaba Karimfar; Iran
98 kg	Yerulan Iskakov; Kazakhstan	Akira Osaka; Japan	Ali Aliyari; Iran
98 kg	Yerulan Iskakov; Kazakhstan	Akira Osaka; Japan	Xiao Di; China
130 kg	Behnam Mehdizadeh; Iran	Murat Ramonov; Kyrgyzstan	Abror Mamasoliev; Uzbekistan
130 kg	Behnam Mehdizadeh; Iran	Murat Ramonov; Kyrgyzstan	Kim Yong-min; South Korea

=== Women's freestyle ===
Event	Gold	Silver	Bronze
48 kg	Tatyana Amanzhol; Kazakhstan	Erdenesükhiin Narangerel; Mongolia	Anna Iwamure; Japan
48 kg	Tatyana Amanzhol; Kazakhstan	Erdenesükhiin Narangerel; Mongolia	Lee Yu-mi; South Korea
53 kg	Zhong Xuechun; China	Nguyễn Thị Lụa; Vietnam	Rozalia Tilegenova; Kyrgyzstan
53 kg	Zhong Xuechun; China	Nguyễn Thị Lụa; Vietnam	Hikari Sugawara; Japan
55 kg	Jong In-sun; North Korea	Pürevdorjiin Orkhon; Mongolia	Aiyim Abdildina; Kazakhstan
55 kg	Jong In-sun; North Korea	Pürevdorjiin Orkhon; Mongolia	Guan Yajing; China
58 kg	Risako Kawai; Japan	Baatarjavyn Shoovdor; Mongolia	Pooja Dhanda; India
58 kg	Risako Kawai; Japan	Baatarjavyn Shoovdor; Mongolia	Han Kum-ok; North Korea
60 kg	Zhang Lan; China	Aisuluu Tynybekova; Kyrgyzstan	Sükheegiin Tserenchimed; Mongolia
60 kg	Zhang Lan; China	Aisuluu Tynybekova; Kyrgyzstan	Haruka Sato; Japan
63 kg	Yurika Ito; Japan	Han Yingyan; China	Kim Ran-mi; North Korea
63 kg	Yurika Ito; Japan	Han Yingyan; China	Yekaterina Larionova; Kazakhstan
69 kg	Sara Dosho; Japan	Sharkhüügiin Tümentsetseg; Mongolia	Elmira Syzdykova; Kazakhstan
69 kg	Sara Dosho; Japan	Sharkhüügiin Tümentsetseg; Mongolia	Yang Bin; China
75 kg	Guzel Manyurova; Kazakhstan	Zhou Feng; China	Jyoti; India
75 kg	Guzel Manyurova; Kazakhstan	Zhou Feng; China	Hiroe Suzuki; Japan

== Participating nations ==
257 competitors from 17 nations competed.

- China (23)
- Chinese Taipei (10)
- India (22)
- Iran (16)
- Iraq (9)
- Japan (24)
- Jordan (1)
- Kazakhstan (24)
- Kyrgyzstan (19)
- Mongolia (16)
- North Korea (10)
- Qatar (3)
- South Korea (20)
- Tajikistan (15)
- Turkmenistan (10)
- Uzbekistan (24)
- Vietnam (11)
