= 2017 Asian Wrestling Championships =

- Host city: New Delhi, India
- Dates: 10–14 May 2017
- Stadium: K. D. Jadhav Indoor Stadium

Champions
- Freestyle: Iran
- Greco-Roman: Iran
- Women: Japan

The 2017 Asian Wrestling Championships was held at the KD Jadhav Indoor Stadium, Indira Gandhi Arena, New Delhi in India. The event took place from 10 to 14 May 2017.

== Medal table ==
Rank	Nation	Gold	Silver	Bronze	Total
1	Japan	8	3	5	16
2	Iran	7	2	6	15
3	Kazakhstan	2	5	6	13
4	Uzbekistan	2	1	3	6
5	India	1	5	4	10
6	South Korea	1	4	6	11
7	Kyrgyzstan	1	1	3	5
7	Mongolia	1	1	3	5
9	China	1	0	8	9
10	North Korea	0	2	2	4
11	Tajikistan	0	0	1	1
11	Vietnam	0	0	1	1
Totals (12 entries)		24	24	48	96

== Team ranking ==
Rank	Men's freestyle		Men's Greco-Roman		Women's freestyle	
Rank	Team	Points	Team	Points	Team	Points
1	Iran	71	Iran	69	Japan	76
2	Japan	55	South Korea	59	India	62
3	Uzbekistan	49	Kazakhstan	59	China	54
4	Kazakhstan	47	Japan	51	Kazakhstan	51
5	South Korea	46	China	50	South Korea	45
6	Mongolia	40	Uzbekistan	43	Mongolia	42
7	Kyrgyzstan	34	India	38	Uzbekistan	28
8	India	33	Kyrgyzstan	30	North Korea	27
9	Tajikistan	22	Tajikistan	18	Kyrgyzstan	18
10	North Korea	19	Chinese Taipei	12	Chinese Taipei	17

== Medal summary ==
=== Men's freestyle ===
Event	Gold	Silver	Bronze
57 kg	Yuki Takahashi; Japan	Zandanbudyn Zanabazar; Mongolia	Reza Atri; Iran
57 kg	Yuki Takahashi; Japan	Zandanbudyn Zanabazar; Mongolia	Nurislam Sanayev; Kazakhstan
61 kg	Behnam Ehsanpour; Iran	Kim Han-song; North Korea	Daulet Niyazbekov; Kazakhstan
61 kg	Behnam Ehsanpour; Iran	Kim Han-song; North Korea	Rei Higuchi; Japan
65 kg	Bajrang Punia; India	Lee Seung-chul; South Korea	Masakazu Kamoi; Japan
65 kg	Bajrang Punia; India	Lee Seung-chul; South Korea	Meisam Nassiri; Iran
70 kg	Akzhurek Tanatarov; Kazakhstan	Ikhtiyor Navruzov; Uzbekistan	Momojiro Nakamura; Japan
70 kg	Akzhurek Tanatarov; Kazakhstan	Ikhtiyor Navruzov; Uzbekistan	Hamed Rashidi; Iran
74 kg	Bekzod Abdurakhmonov; Uzbekistan	Muslim Evloev; Kyrgyzstan	Zhang Chongyao; China
74 kg	Bekzod Abdurakhmonov; Uzbekistan	Muslim Evloev; Kyrgyzstan	Bahman Teymouri; Iran
86 kg	Alireza Karimi; Iran	Azamat Dauletbekov; Kazakhstan	Umidjon Ismanov; Uzbekistan
86 kg	Alireza Karimi; Iran	Azamat Dauletbekov; Kazakhstan	Pürevjavyn Önörbat; Mongolia
97 kg	Magomed Ibragimov; Uzbekistan	Hossein Shahbazi; Iran	Seo Min-won; South Korea
97 kg	Magomed Ibragimov; Uzbekistan	Hossein Shahbazi; Iran	Magomed Musaev; Kyrgyzstan
125 kg	Yadollah Mohebbi; Iran	Sumit Malik; India	Taiki Yamamoto; Japan
125 kg	Yadollah Mohebbi; Iran	Sumit Malik; India	Natsagsürengiin Zolboo; Mongolia

=== Men's Greco-Roman ===
Event	Gold	Silver	Bronze
59 kg	Kenichiro Fumita; Japan	Meirambek Ainagulov; Kazakhstan	Ri Sin-myong; North Korea
59 kg	Kenichiro Fumita; Japan	Meirambek Ainagulov; Kazakhstan	Saman Abdevali; Iran
66 kg	Oh Sang-hun; South Korea	Almat Kebispayev; Kazakhstan	Dong Jinxin; China
66 kg	Oh Sang-hun; South Korea	Almat Kebispayev; Kazakhstan	Ali Arsalan; Iran
71 kg	Takeshi Izumi; Japan	Afshin Biabangard; Iran	Nurgazy Asangulov; Kyrgyzstan
71 kg	Takeshi Izumi; Japan	Afshin Biabangard; Iran	Kim Ji-hun; South Korea
75 kg	Maxat Yerezhepov; Kazakhstan	Park Dae-seung; South Korea	Bakhtovar Khasanov; Tajikistan
75 kg	Maxat Yerezhepov; Kazakhstan	Park Dae-seung; South Korea	Yang Bin; China
80 kg	Ramin Taheri; Iran	Kim June-hyoung; South Korea	Samat Shirdakov; Kyrgyzstan
80 kg	Ramin Taheri; Iran	Kim June-hyoung; South Korea	Harpreet Singh Sandhu; India
85 kg	Hossein Nouri; Iran	Atsushi Matsumoto; Japan	Anil Kumar; India
85 kg	Hossein Nouri; Iran	Atsushi Matsumoto; Japan	Peng Fei; China
98 kg	Mostafa Salehizadeh; Iran	Kim Seung-jun; South Korea	Rustam Assakalov; Uzbekistan
98 kg	Mostafa Salehizadeh; Iran	Kim Seung-jun; South Korea	Yerulan Iskakov; Kazakhstan
130 kg	Behnam Mehdizadeh; Iran	Damir Kuzembayev; Kazakhstan	Muminjon Abdullaev; Uzbekistan
130 kg	Behnam Mehdizadeh; Iran	Damir Kuzembayev; Kazakhstan	Kim Min-seok; South Korea

=== Women's freestyle ===
Event	Gold	Silver	Bronze
48 kg	Yui Susaki; Japan	Kim Son-hyang; North Korea	Irina Borissova; Kazakhstan
48 kg	Yui Susaki; Japan	Kim Son-hyang; North Korea	Ritu Phogat; India
53 kg	Mayu Mukaida; Japan	Zhuldyz Eshimova; Kazakhstan	Kim Hyung-joo; South Korea
53 kg	Mayu Mukaida; Japan	Zhuldyz Eshimova; Kazakhstan	Jong Myong-suk; North Korea
55 kg	Sae Nanjo; Japan	Vinesh Phogat; India	Erkhembayaryn Davaachimeg; Mongolia
55 kg	Sae Nanjo; Japan	Vinesh Phogat; India	Zhang Qi; China
58 kg	Aisuluu Tynybekova; Kyrgyzstan	Sarita Mor; India	Đào Thị Hương; Vietnam
58 kg	Aisuluu Tynybekova; Kyrgyzstan	Sarita Mor; India	Katsuki Sakagami; Japan
60 kg	Risako Kawai; Japan	Sakshi Malik; India	Zhou Zhangting; China
60 kg	Risako Kawai; Japan	Sakshi Malik; India	Ayaulym Kassymova; Kazakhstan
63 kg	Soronzonboldyn Battsetseg; Mongolia	Ayana Gempei; Japan	Hang Jin-young; South Korea
63 kg	Soronzonboldyn Battsetseg; Mongolia	Ayana Gempei; Japan	Wang Xiaoqian; China
69 kg	Sara Dosho; Japan	Divya Kakran; India	Zhou Feng; China
69 kg	Sara Dosho; Japan	Divya Kakran; India	Park Hyeon-yeong; South Korea
75 kg	Paliha; China	Masako Furuichi; Japan	Jyoti; India
75 kg	Paliha; China	Masako Furuichi; Japan	Gulmaral Yerkebayeva; Kazakhstan

== Participating nations ==
255 competitors from 19 nations competed.

- Cambodia (1)
- China (22)
- Chinese Taipei (11)
- India (24)
- Iran (16)
- Japan (24)
- Kazakhstan (24)
- Kyrgyzstan (17)
- Mongolia (16)
- North Korea (9)
- Palestine (1)
- Qatar (2)
- South Korea (24)
- Sri Lanka (10)
- Tajikistan (12)
- Thailand (10)
- Turkmenistan (3)
- Uzbekistan (24)
- Vietnam (5)
