= Sosruko Kodzokov =

Russian-Brazilian Greco-Roman wrestler

Сосруко Кодзоков Sosruko Kodzokov
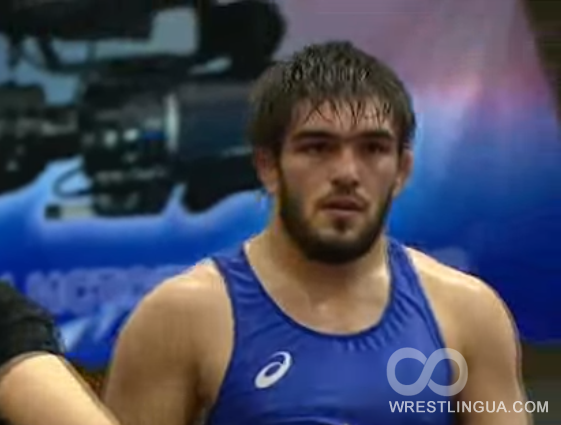

Personal information
- Native name: Russian: Сосруко Каральбиевич Кодзоков
- Full name: Sosruko Karalbievich Kodzokov
- Nationality: Russian; Brazilian
- Born: 17 November 1993 (age 32) Atazhukino, Kabardino-Balkaria, Russia
- Height: 177 cm (5 ft 10 in)

Sport
- Country: Russia (2012-2021); Brazil (2023 — present)
- Sport: Wrestling
- Weight class: 87 kg
- Rank: International Master of sports
- Event: Greco-Roman
- Club: Yarygin's martial arts palace (Moscow); Olympic training center Nº 64 (Moscow)
- Coached by: Anzor Kardanov; Sergey Shevyrev; Samvel Danielyan
Medal record
Men's Greco-Roman
Representing Brazil
Pan American Championships
Gold medal – first place	2024 Acapulco	82 kg
Representing Russia
World Military Championships
Gold medal – first place	2018 Moscow	87 kg
World Cup
Silver medal – second place	2016 Shiraz	Team
Junior World Championships
Gold medal – first place	2013 Sofia	84 kg
Junior European Championships
Gold medal – first place	2012 Zagreb	84 kg

Sosruko Karalbievich Kodzokov (Russian: Сосруко Каральбиевич Кодзоков; born 17 November 1993) is a Russian-Brazilian Greco-Roman wrestler of Circassian ethnicity, who competes at 87 kilograms. 2024 Pan American champion, 2016 World cup silver medalist. 2017 Russian national champion.

== Background ==
Kodzokov was born on 17 November 1993 into a Circassian family in Atazhukino village, Kabardino-Balkaria, Russia. He started wrestling as a child in 2004 under his first coach Khasan Tezadov.

== Sport career ==
He made the European team in 2012, where he competed at the Junior European championships at 84 kilos and won the gold medal. In 2013, he won the gold medal at the Junior world championships, in the final match he defeated Yousef Ghaderian of Iran. During 2016, he took the bronze medal from the Ivan Poddubny grand prix, was runner-up at the World Cup as a Russian team member, bronze medalist in the senior Greco-Roman 85 kg event at the Russian national championships and placer of the Al Rosa tournament in Moscow. In 2017, he became Russian national champion at 85 kilograms, finished with gold medal at the Al Rosa (Moscow lights) tournament and was the finalist at the Oleg Karavayev Memorial in Minsk, Belarus. In 2018, he won the World Military Championship in 87 kg In 2019, he finished with silver medals at the Russian National Championships and Grand Prix of Germany. In 2020, he was third at the Russian cup. Since 2023, he started competing for Brazil in international level. In November 2023, he took the third place at the Ivan Poddubny ranking series as a Brazilian athlete. In 2024, he won the Pan American Championships, in the final match he beat american Mahmoud Fawzy.

== Achievements ==
- 2012 Junior European Championships — 1st;
- 2013 Junior World Championships — 1st;
- 2016, 2018 Ivan Poddubny grand prix — 3rd;
- 2016 World Cup — 2nd;
- 2016 Russian National Championships — 3rd;
- 2016 Al Rosa — 1st;
- 2017 Russian National Championships — 1st;
- 2017 Al Rosa — 1st;
- 2017 Oleg Karavayev Memorial — 2nd;
- 2018 World Military Championship — 1st;
- 2019 Russian National Championships — 2nd;
- 2019 Grand Prix of Germany — 2nd;
- 2020 Russian Cup — 3rd;
- 2023 Brazilian National Championships — 1st;
- 2023 Ivan Poddubny ranking series — 3rd;
- 2024 Pan American Championships — 1st;

== Personal life ==
He has a younger brother Alikhan, that competes in Greco-Roman wrestling as well.
