= Zandanbudyn Zanabazar =

Mongolian freestyle wrestler

Personal information
- Native name: Занданбудын Занабазар
- Nationality: Mongolia
- Born: 15 February 1996 (age 30) Dalanzadgad, Ömnögovi, Mongolia
- Height: 160 cm (5 ft 3 in)
- Website: Instagram Profile

Sport
- Country: Mongolia
- Sport: Amateur wrestling
- Weight class: 57 kg
- Event: Freestyle

Achievements and titles
- World finals: (bronze) (2022)
- Regional finals: (silver) (2017)
- National finals: (gold) (2022) (gold) (2023)
Medal record
Men's freestyle wrestling
Representing Mongolia
World Championships
Bronze medal – third place	2022 Belgrade	57 kg
Asian Championships
Silver medal – second place	2017 New Delhi	57 kg
Dinmukhamed Kunaev Tournament
Bronze medal – third place	2022 Taraz	57 kg
U20 Asian Championships
Bronze medal – third place	2014 Ulaanbaatar	55 kg
U17 World Championships
Bronze medal – third place	2013 Zrenjanin	54 kg
U17 Asian Championships
Gold medal – first place	2013 Ulaanbaatar	54 kg

Zandanbudyn Zanabazar (born 15 February 1996) is a Mongolian freestyle wrestler. He won one of the bronze medals in the men's 57 kg event at the 2022 World Wrestling Championships held in Belgrade, Serbia. He won the silver medal in his event at the 2017 Asian Wrestling Championships held in New Delhi, India.

He also competed at the 2021 Asian Wrestling Championships, the 2022 Yasar Dogu Tournament and the 2022 Asian Wrestling Championships.

== Achievements ==
Year	Tournament	Location	Result	Event
2017	Asian Championships	New Delhi, India	2nd	Freestyle 57 kg
2022	World Championships	Belgrade, Serbia	3rd	Freestyle 57 kg
