= Hossein Nouri (wrestler, born 1990) =

Iranian Greco-Roman wrestler

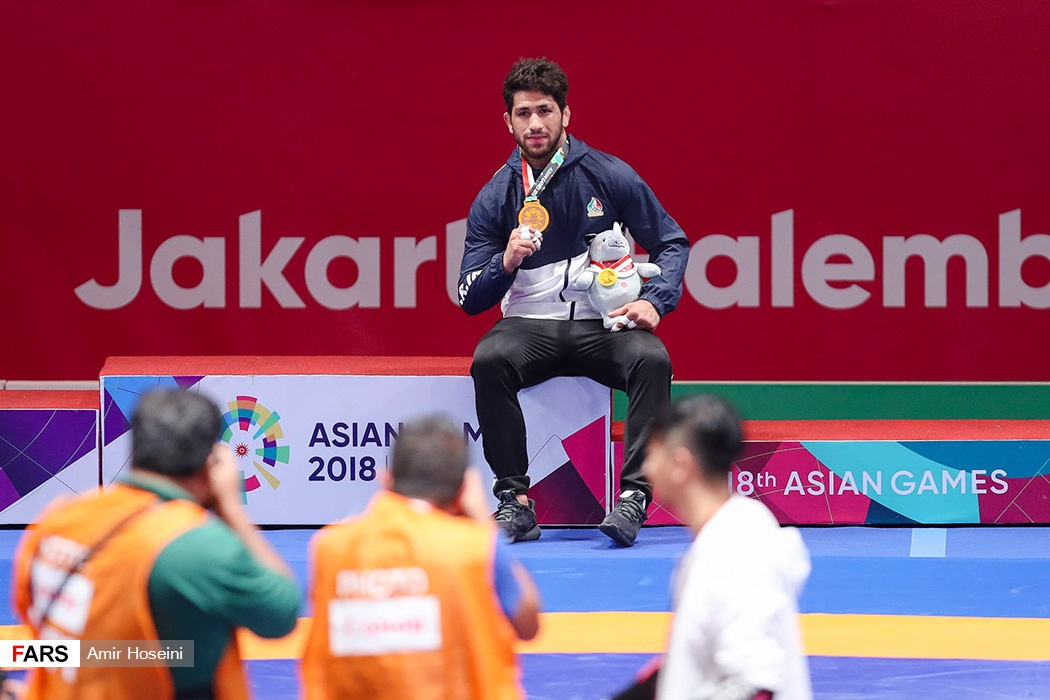
- 2018 Asian Games

Personal information
- Native name: حسین نوری
- Full name: Hossein Nouri
- Nationality: Iran
- Born: 4 August 1990 (age 36) Zanjan, Iran
- Height: 1.80 m (5 ft 11 in)
- Weight: 87 kg (192 lb)
- Website: Official Instagram Profile

Sport
- Country: Iran
- Sport: Wrestling
- Event: Greco-Roman
- Coached by: Ali Ashkani (national); Rezae Almasi (personal)
- Now coaching: Mohammad Bana (national)
Medal record
Representing Iran Men's Greco-Roman wrestling
World Championships
Bronze medal – third place	2017 Paris	85 kg
Asian Games
Gold medal – first place	2018 Jakarta	87 kg
Asian Championships
Gold medal – first place	2017 New Delhi	85 kg
Gold medal – first place	2018 Bishkek	87 kg
Gold medal – first place	2019 Xi'an	87 kg

Hossein Nouri (Persian: حسین نوری, born 4 August 1990) is a professional Iranian wrestler of the Iranian national team. He has won the bronze medal of the World Championships, the gold medal of the Asian Games in 2018 and also 3 championship titles in the Asian Championships.

== Career ==
In 2010 he won the silver Known as Hossein Nouri He won the gold medal at the 2018 Asian Wrestling Championships He won the bronze medalist at the 2017 World Wrestling Championships He won the gold medal at the 2017 Asian Wrestling Championship He won the gold medal at the 2019 Asian Wrestling Championship He won the gold medal at the Wrestling at the 2018 Asian Games – Men's Greco-Roman 87 kg.He won gold medal 2016 Wrestling World Cup - Men's Creco-Roman

He won bronze medal 2017 Wrestling World Cup - Men's Greco-Roman.

== World Championship 2017 ==
Nouri was able to obtain a license to participate in the 2017 World Wrestling Championship by beating his rivals in the selection tests of the Iranian team. He won the first World Cup 7–5 against Ividas Stankovicius of Lithuania, and then finished third in Estonia with a score of 3–1 at Eric Ops, fifth in Europe, to reach the quarter-finals. At this stage, Nouri competed against Victor Lawrence, the 2014 world bronze medalist, the 2017 European champion and the fifth person of the Rio 2016 Olympics from Hungary, and won 6-4 and reached the semifinals. Nouri lost to Denis Kodella of Germany 4–1 in the semifinals. Nouri lost to Denis Kodella of Germany 4–1 in the semifinals and went on to compete against Islam Abbasov of Azerbaijan for a bronze medal in the qualifying match, winning the medal 4–0.

== 2018 Asian Games ==
At the 2018 Asian Games in Jakarta, Nouri defeated Turkmenistan's Shihaz Avilikov 3-4 and Yemen's Mohammad Al-Quhali 8–0 to compete for the gold medal, with Rustam Asakalov of Uzbekistan competing for the gold medal. Defeated 6–1 to win the Asian Games.

== 2019 Asian Championship ==
Nouri competed in the 87 kg category on April 27, 2019, as part of the Asian Championships. In defending the title, he first defeated Phi Peng of China 3–1, and then defeated Matsu III of Japan 4–2 in the second leg to advance to the semifinals. Nouri defeated Uzbekistan's Rostam Asakalov 3–0 in a close match to win the gold medal for the third year in a row, defeating India's Sunil Kumar 2–0 in the final.

== Honours ==
=== National ===
- World Championship
  - Bronze : 2017, Greco-Roman 85 kg
- Asian Gemes
  - Gold: 2018, Greco-Roman 87 kg
  - Asian Championship Gold:2017, delhi
  - Asian Championship Gold: 2018,Biskhek
  - Asian Championship Gold: 2019, Xian
  - World Cup Gold: 2016 Shiraz
  - World Cup Bronze : 2017 Abadan
