= 2022 World Wrestling Championships – Men's freestyle 57 kg =

Wrestling competitions

Men's freestyle 57 kg at the 2022 World Championships
- Venue: Štark Arena
- Dates: 16–17 September 2022
- Competitors: 31 from 31 nations

Medalists
gold medal	Zelimkhan Abakarov	Albania
silver medal	Thomas Gilman	United States
bronze medal	Zandanbudyn Zanabazar	Mongolia
bronze medal	Stevan Mićić	Serbia

The men's freestyle 57 kilograms is a competition featured at the 2022 World Wrestling Championships, and was held in Belgrade, Serbia on 16 and 17 September 2022.

This freestyle wrestling competition consists of a single-elimination tournament, with a repechage used to determine the winner of two bronze medals. The two finalists face off for gold and silver medals. Each wrestler who loses to one of the two finalists moves into the repechage, culminating in a pair of bronze medal matches featuring the semifinal losers each facing the remaining repechage opponent from their half of the bracket.

== Results ==
Legend

- F — Won by fall

=== Final ===
Final
Thomas Gilman (USA)	2
Zelimkhan Abakarov (ALB)	7

=== Top half ===
Round of 32
Georgii Okorokov (AUS)	6^{F}
Edwin Segura (GUA)	0
Zandanbudyn Zanabazar (MGL)	5
Darthe Capellan (CAN)	1
Bekbolot Myrzanazar Uulu (KGZ)	3
Muhammet Karavuş (TUR)	10
Vladimir Egorov (MKD)	7
Manvel Khndzrtsyan (ARM)	5
Muhamad Ikromov (TJK)	3
Darian Cruz (PUR)	5
Aliabbas Rzazade (AZE)	4
Kim Sung-gwon (KOR)	4
Zou Wanhao (CHN)	6
Alireza Sarlak (IRI)	2

Round of 16
Thomas Gilman (USA)	11
Georgii Okorokov (AUS)	0
Zandanbudyn Zanabazar (MGL)	8^{F}
Muhammet Karavuş (TUR)	4
Vladimir Egorov (MKD)	0
Darian Cruz (PUR)	3
Aliabbas Rzazade (AZE)	3
Zou Wanhao (CHN)	5

Quarterfinals
Thomas Gilman (USA)	5
Zandanbudyn Zanabazar (MGL)	1
Darian Cruz (PUR)	1
Zou Wanhao (CHN)	3

Semifinals
Thomas Gilman (USA)	8
Zou Wanhao (CHN)	2

=== Bottom half ===
Round of 32
Horst Lehr (GER)	3
Rakhat Kalzhan (KAZ)	4
Roberto Alejandro (MEX)	2
Stevan Mićić (SRB)	12
Toshihiro Hasegawa (JPN)	16
Kamil Kerymov (UKR)	9
Levan Metreveli (ESP)	0
Beka Bujiashvili (GEO)	6
Óscar Tigreros (COL)	0
Zelimkhan Abakarov (ALB)	10
Reineri Andreu (CUB)	10
Jakobo Tau (RSA)	0
Diamantino Iuna Fafé (GBS)	1
Gulomjon Abdullaev (UZB)	11
Răzvan Kovacs (ROU)	0
Ravi Kumar Dahiya (IND)	10

Round of 16
Rakhat Kalzhan (KAZ)	1
Stevan Mićić (SRB)	12
Toshihiro Hasegawa (JPN)	8
Beka Bujiashvili (GEO)	2
Zelimkhan Abakarov (ALB)	10
Reineri Andreu (CUB)	0
Gulomjon Abdullaev (UZB)	10
Ravi Kumar Dahiya (IND)	0

Quarterfinals
Stevan Mićić (SRB)	7
Toshihiro Hasegawa (JPN)	1
Zelimkhan Abakarov (ALB)	13
Gulomjon Abdullaev (UZB)	2

Semifinals
Stevan Mićić (SRB)	1
Zelimkhan Abakarov (ALB)	6

=== Repechage ===
Repechage round 1
Óscar Tigreros (COL)	0
Reineri Andreu (CUB)	10

Repechage round 2
Georgii Okorokov (AUS)	2
Zandanbudyn Zanabazar (MGL)	12
Reineri Andreu (CUB)	4
Gulomjon Abdullaev (UZB)	3

Bronze medals
Zandanbudyn Zanabazar (MGL)	3^{F}
Zou Wanhao (CHN)	1
Reineri Andreu (CUB)	1
Stevan Mićić (SRB)	7

== Final standing ==
Rank	Athlete
1st place, gold medalist(s)	Zelimkhan Abakarov (ALB)
2nd place, silver medalist(s)	Thomas Gilman (USA)
3rd place, bronze medalist(s)	Zandanbudyn Zanabazar (MGL)
3rd place, bronze medalist(s)	Stevan Mićić (SRB)
5	Zou Wanhao (CHN)
5	Reineri Andreu (CUB)
7	Gulomjon Abdullaev (UZB)
8	Toshihiro Hasegawa (JPN)
9	Darian Cruz (PUR)
10	Georgii Okorokov (AUS)
11	Ravi Kumar Dahiya (IND)
12	Beka Bujiashvili (GEO)
13	Aliabbas Rzazade (AZE)
14	Rakhat Kalzhan (KAZ)
15	Muhammet Karavuş (TUR)
16	Vladimir Egorov (MKD)
17	Kamil Kerymov (UKR)
18	Manvel Khndzrtsyan (ARM)
19	Kim Sung-gwon (KOR)
20	Horst Lehr (GER)
21	Muhamad Ikromov (TJK)
22	Bekbolot Myrzanazar Uulu (KGZ)
23	Alireza Sarlak (IRI)
24	Roberto Alejandro (MEX)
25	Darthe Capellan (CAN)
26	Diamantino Iuna Fafé (GBS)
27	Edwin Segura (GUA)
28	Levan Metreveli (ESP)
29	Jakobo Tau (RSA)
30	Răzvan Kovacs (ROU)
31	Óscar Tigreros (COL)
