= Kim Seung-jun (wrestler) =

South Korean wrestler (born 1994)

Personal information
- Born: 12 September 1994 (age 32) Busan
Medal record
Men's Greco-Roman wrestling
Representing South Korea
Asian Championships
Silver medal – second place	2017 New Delhi	98 kg
Silver medal – second place	2021 Almaty	97 kg

Kim Seung-jun (Korean: 김승준; born 12 September 1994) is a South Korean Greco-Roman wrestler. Kim competed for South Korea at the 2024 Summer Olympics in the men's Greco-Roman 97 kg event. He lost 0-9 to Armenian Artur Aleksanyan. In the repechage, Kim lost 8-2 to Rustam Assakalov of Uzbekistan.
