= 2013 World Junior Wrestling Championships =

Junior Wrestling Championships

- Host city: Sofia, Bulgaria
- Dates: August 12 - 18, 2013

Champions
- Freestyle: Russia
- Greco-Roman: Russia
- Women: Japan

The 2013 World Junior Wrestling Championships were the 37th edition of the World Junior Wrestling Championships and were held in Sofia, Bulgaria between August 12 - 18, 2013.

== Medal table ==
| Rank | Nation | Gold | Silver | Bronze | Total |
|---|---|---|---|---|---|
| 1 | Russia | 7 | 4 | 4 | 15 |
| 2 | Turkey | 3 | 2 | 2 | 7 |
| 3 | Japan | 3 | 0 | 3 | 6 |
| 4 | Iran | 2 | 2 | 3 | 7 |
| 5 | Armenia | 2 | 1 | 1 | 4 |
| 6 | Georgia | 1 | 2 | 2 | 5 |
| 6 | United States | 1 | 2 | 2 | 5 |
| 8 | Azerbaijan | 1 | 1 | 9 | 11 |
| 9 | Bulgaria | 1 | 1 | 2 | 4 |
| 9 | Mongolia | 1 | 1 | 2 | 4 |
| 11 | Canada | 1 | 1 | 1 | 3 |
| 12 | Moldova | 1 | 0 | 0 | 1 |
| 13 | Ukraine | 0 | 3 | 1 | 4 |
| 14 | Israel | 0 | 1 | 1 | 2 |
| 14 | Kazakhstan | 0 | 1 | 1 | 2 |
| 14 | Romania | 0 | 1 | 1 | 2 |
| 17 | Austria | 0 | 1 | 0 | 1 |
| 18 | Hungary | 0 | 0 | 2 | 2 |
| 19 | China | 0 | 0 | 1 | 1 |
| 19 | Egypt | 0 | 0 | 1 | 1 |
| 19 | Finland | 0 | 0 | 1 | 1 |
| 19 | Germany | 0 | 0 | 1 | 1 |
| 19 | India | 0 | 0 | 1 | 1 |
| 19 | Italy | 0 | 0 | 1 | 1 |
| 19 | Kyrgyzstan | 0 | 0 | 1 | 1 |
| 19 | Lithuania | 0 | 0 | 1 | 1 |
| 19 | South Korea | 0 | 0 | 1 | 1 |
| 19 | Sweden | 0 | 0 | 1 | 1 |
| 19 | Uzbekistan | 0 | 0 | 1 | 1 |
| Totals (29 entries) | | 24 | 24 | 48 | 96 |

== Medal summary ==
=== Men's freestyle ===
| Event | Gold | Silver | Bronze |
|---|---|---|---|
| 50 kg | Süleyman Atlı; Turkey | Yernur Kabataev; Kazakhstan | Mehmed Feraim; Bulgaria |
| 50 kg | Süleyman Atlı; Turkey | Yernur Kabataev; Kazakhstan | Makhmudjon Shavkatov; Uzbekistan |
| 55 kg | Younes Sarmasti; Iran | Iszmail Muszukajev; Russia | Beka Bujiashvili; Georgia |
| 55 kg | Younes Sarmasti; Iran | Iszmail Muszukajev; Russia | Artak Hovhannisyan; Armenia |
| 60 kg | Akhmednabi Gvarzatilov; Azerbaijan | Batboldyn Nomin; Mongolia | Gamlet Ramonov; Russia |
| 60 kg | Akhmednabi Gvarzatilov; Azerbaijan | Batboldyn Nomin; Mongolia | Shota Phartenadze; Georgia |
| 66 kg | Selahattin Kılıçsallayan; Turkey | David Buziashvili; Georgia | Gadzhimurad Omarov; Azerbaijan |
| 66 kg | Selahattin Kılıçsallayan; Turkey | David Buziashvili; Georgia | Peiman Yarahmadi; Iran |
| 74 kg | Alan Zaseev; Russia | Alex Dieringer; United States | Bakhtiyar Israfilli; Azerbaijan |
| 74 kg | Alan Zaseev; Russia | Alex Dieringer; United States | Mostafa Ghiyasi; Iran |
| 84 kg | Vladislav Valiev; Russia | Ophir Bernstein; Israel | Magomed Abdulkhalikov; Azerbaijan |
| 84 kg | Vladislav Valiev; Russia | Ophir Bernstein; Israel | Wladimir Remel; Germany |
| 96 kg | Kyle Snyder; United States | Viktor Kazishvili; Armenia | Satyawart Kadian; India |
| 96 kg | Kyle Snyder; United States | Viktor Kazishvili; Armenia | Yusup Malachmagomedov; Russia |
| 120 kg | Geno Petriashvili; Georgia | Abdollah Avili; Iran | Ali Magomedabirov; Azerbaijan |
| 120 kg | Geno Petriashvili; Georgia | Abdollah Avili; Iran | Sunny Dhinsa; Canada |

=== Greco-Roman ===
| Event | Gold | Silver | Bronze |
|---|---|---|---|
| 50 kg | Farshad Isvandmahmoudi; Iran | Alexander Trifonov; Ukraine | Bence Juhasz; Hungary |
| 50 kg | Farshad Isvandmahmoudi; Iran | Alexander Trifonov; Ukraine | Alexandru-Vasile Botez; Romania |
| 55 kg | Şerif Kılıç; Turkey | Ruben Minasyan; Russia | Andrei Tsaryuk; Israel |
| 55 kg | Şerif Kılıç; Turkey | Ruben Minasyan; Russia | Akan Baimaganbetov; Kazakhstan |
| 60 kg | Karen Aslanyan; Armenia | Enes Başar; Turkey | Radoslav Vasilev; Bulgaria |
| 60 kg | Karen Aslanyan; Armenia | Enes Başar; Turkey | Elman Mukhtarov; Azerbaijan |
| 66 kg | Abuyazid Mantsigov; Russia | Shmagi Bolkvadze; Georgia | Shohei Yabiku; Japan |
| 66 kg | Abuyazid Mantsigov; Russia | Shmagi Bolkvadze; Georgia | Ramin Taherisartang; Iran |
| 74 kg | Karapet Chalyan; Armenia | Andrii Antoniuk; Ukraine | Jeyhun Aliyev; Azerbaijan |
| 74 kg | Karapet Chalyan; Armenia | Andrii Antoniuk; Ukraine | Bekkhan Ozdoev; Russia |
| 84 kg | Sosruko Kodzokov; Russia | Yousef Ghaderian; Iran | Tarek Abdelsalam; Egypt |
| 84 kg | Sosruko Kodzokov; Russia | Yousef Ghaderian; Iran | Orkhan Nuriev; Azerbaijan |
| 96 kg | Musa Evloev; Russia | Daniel Gastl; Austria | Fatih Başköy; Turkey |
| 96 kg | Musa Evloev; Russia | Daniel Gastl; Austria | Romas Fridrikas; Lithuania |
| 120 kg | Sergey Semenov; Russia | Abas Abdullaev; Azerbaijan | Samuel Stoll; United States |
| 120 kg | Sergey Semenov; Russia | Abas Abdullaev; Azerbaijan | Kim Min-seok; South Korea |

=== Women's freestyle ===
| Event | Gold | Silver | Bronze |
|---|---|---|---|
| 44 kg | Emilia Budeanu; Moldova | Erin Golston; United States | Rina Okuno; Japan |
| 44 kg | Emilia Budeanu; Moldova | Erin Golston; United States | Evin Demirhan; Turkey |
| 48 kg | Elitsa Yankova; Bulgaria | Alina Vuc; Romania | Mercédesz Dénes; Hungary |
| 48 kg | Elitsa Yankova; Bulgaria | Alina Vuc; Romania | Fredrika Petersson; Sweden |
| 51 kg | Yu Miyahara; Japan | Stalvira Orshush; Russia | Lilya Horishna; Ukraine |
| 51 kg | Yu Miyahara; Japan | Stalvira Orshush; Russia | Erkhembayaryn Davaachimeg; Mongolia |
| 55 kg | Risako Kawai; Japan | Larisa Skoblyuk; Ukraine | Pürevdorjiin Orkhon; Mongolia |
| 55 kg | Risako Kawai; Japan | Larisa Skoblyuk; Ukraine | Olga Khoroshavtseva; Russia |
| 59 kg | Sükheegiin Tserenchimed; Mongolia | Braxton Stone-Papadopoulos; Canada | Aisuluu Tynybekova; Kyrgyzstan |
| 59 kg | Sükheegiin Tserenchimed; Mongolia | Braxton Stone-Papadopoulos; Canada | Petra Olli; Finland |
| 63 kg | Svetlana Lipatova; Russia | Buse Tosun; Turkey | Ragneta Gurbanzade; Azerbaijan |
| 63 kg | Svetlana Lipatova; Russia | Buse Tosun; Turkey | Jennifer Rogers; United States |
| 67 kg | Dorothy Yeats; Canada | Dzhanan Manolova; Bulgaria | Dalma Caneva; Italy |
| 67 kg | Dorothy Yeats; Canada | Dzhanan Manolova; Bulgaria | Kona Suzuki; Japan |
| 72 kg | Rino Abe; Japan | Tatyana Kolesnikova; Russia | Xu Rui; China |
| 72 kg | Rino Abe; Japan | Tatyana Kolesnikova; Russia | Sabira Aliyeva; Azerbaijan |
