= Jyoti (wrestler) =

Indian wrestler (born 1985)

Personal information
- Nationality: Indian
- Born: 17 December 1985 (age 40) Delhi, India
- Weight: 75 kg (165 lb)

Sport
- Sport: Sport wrestling
- Event: Freestyle
Medal record
Women's freestyle wrestling
Representing India
Asian Championships
Bronze medal – third place	2013 New Delhi	72 kg
Bronze medal – third place	2014 Astana	75 kg
Bronze medal – third place	2017 New Delhi	75 kg
World Military Championships
Gold medal – first place	2025 Warendorf	50 kg
Commonwealth Championship
Silver medal – second place	2005 Stellenbosch	72 kg
Gold medal – first place	2007 London	67 kg

Jyoti (born 17 December 1985) is an Indian wrestler. She represented India in the women's freestyle 75 kg category at the 2014 Commonwealth Games in Glasgow in which she placed fourth. 2014 Asian Games in (INCHEON) She placed fourth
