= Zurab Yevloyev =

Russian footballer

Personal information
- Full name: Zurab Magomedovich Yevloyev
- Date of birth: 20 February 1980 (age 46)
- Height: 1.75 m (5 ft 9 in)
- Position: Striker

Senior career*
Years	Team	Apps	(Gls)
1999–2002	FC Neftyanik Malgobek		
2003	FC Spartak-Naur Naurskaya		
2003–2006	FC Angusht Nazran	54	(5)
2010	FC Angusht Nazran	0	(0)
- * Club domestic league appearances and goals

Zurab Magomedovich Yevloyev (Russian: Зураб Магомедович Евлоев; born 20 February 1980) is a former Russian professional football player.

== Club career ==
He played in the Russian Football National League for FC Angusht Nazran in 2006.
