= Arkadiusz Kułynycz =

Polish Greco-Roman wrestler

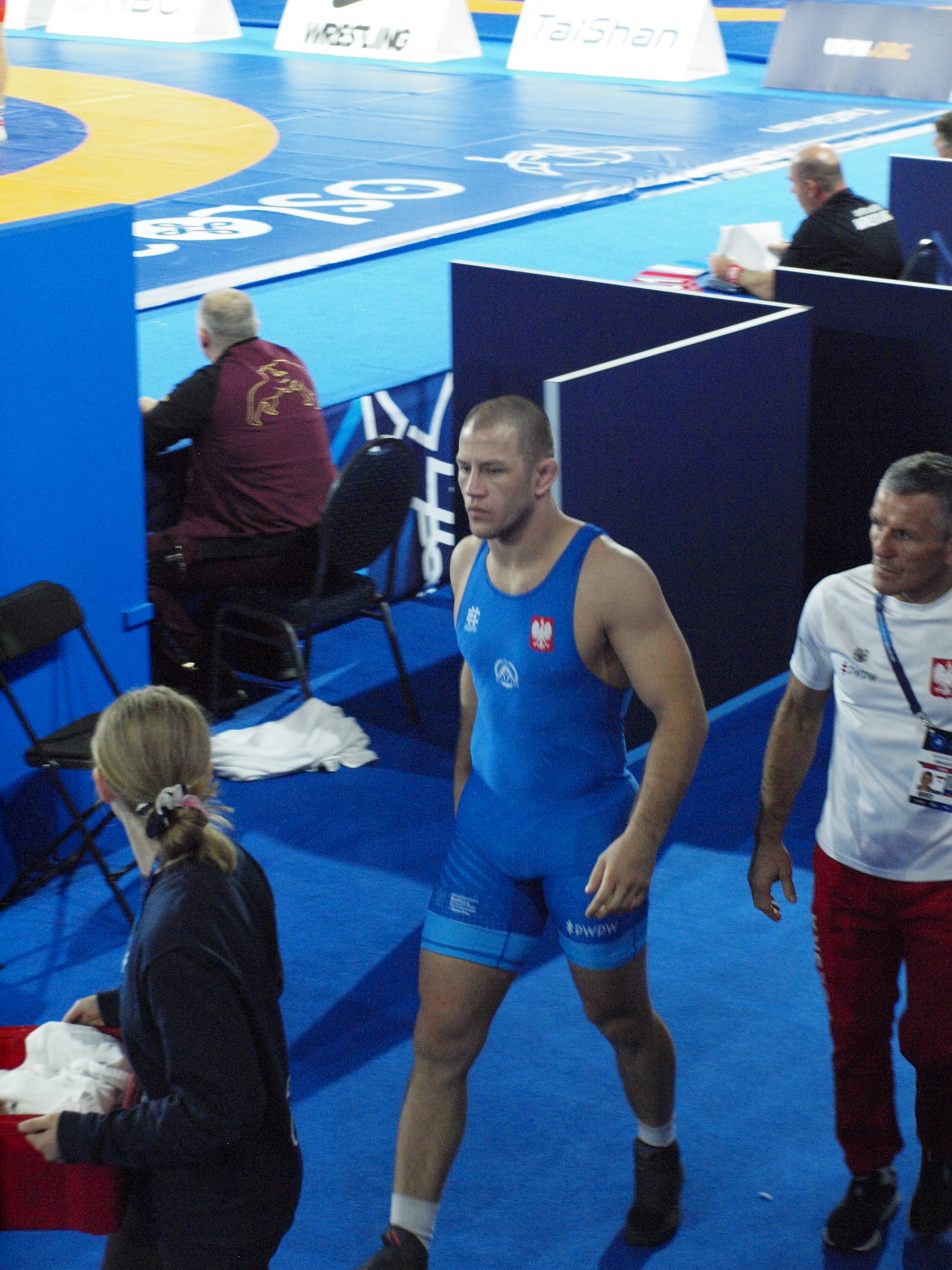
- Arkadiusz Kułynycz at the 2021 World Wrestling Championships in Oslo, Norway

Personal information
- Full name: Arkadiusz Marcin Kułynycz
- Born: 26 December 1992 (age 33) Miastko, Poland
- Height: 180 cm (5 ft 11 in)

Sport
- Country: Poland
- Sport: Amateur wrestling
- Weight class: 87 kg
- Event: Greco-Roman
Medal record
Men's Greco-Roman wrestling
Representing Poland
World Championships
Bronze medal – third place	2021 Oslo	87 kg
European Games
Bronze medal – third place	2019 Minsk	87 kg

Arkadiusz Marcin Kułynycz (born 26 December 1992) is a Polish Greco-Roman wrestler. He won one of the bronze medals in the 87 kg event at the 2021 World Wrestling Championships held in Oslo, Norway.

He represented Poland at the 2019 European Games in Minsk, Belarus and he won one of the bronze medals in the 87 kg event.

Kułynycz represented Poland at the 2024 Summer Olympics in Paris, France. He lost his bronze medal match in the 87 kg event at the Olympics.

== Achievements ==
Year	Tournament	Venue	Result	Event
2019	European Games	Minsk, Belarus	3rd	Greco-Roman 87 kg
2021	World Championships	Oslo, Norway	3rd	Greco-Roman 87 kg
