= Majra =

- Village
- Location in Haryana, India Majra (India)
- Coordinates: 28.667°N 76.456°E
- Country: India
- State: Haryana
- District: Jhajjar
- Tehsil: Beri

Government
  - Body: Village panchayat

Population (2011)
  - Total: 16,888

Languages
  - Official: Hindi
- Time zone: UTC+5:30 (IST)
- PIN: 124202
- Vehicle registration: HR

Majra is a village in the Jhajjar district of the Indian state of Haryana. It is part of the town of Beri. As per 2011 Census of India, the village had 1,804 households, with a total population of 11,488, of which 6,380 were males and 5,108 were females. This village was established by baba Mohan Dasji And is it famous for Swami Nitanand mandir (jatela dham). This village has 3 panchayat.
