= Yang Bin (wrestler) =

Chinese Greco-Roman wrestler

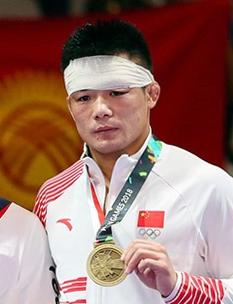
- Yang at the 2018 Asian Games

Personal information
- Born: July 10, 1989 (age 37) Tengzhou, China
- Education: Shandong Sport University
- Height: 181 cm (5 ft 11 in)

Sport
- Sport: Greco-Roman wrestling
- Coached by: Sheng Zetian
Medal record
Representing China
Asian Games
Bronze medal – third place	2018 Jakarta	77 kg
Asian Championships
Gold medal – first place	2018 Bishkek	77 kg
Bronze medal – third place	2017 New Delhi	75 kg
Bronze medal – third place	2014 Astana	75 kg

Yang Bin (born July 10, 1989) is a Chinese Greco-Roman wrestler. He competed in the 75 kg event at the 2016 Summer Olympics and was eliminated in the repechage by Kim Hyeon-woo. Yang won one gold and two bronze medals at the Asian championships in 2014–2018. He also won a bronze medal at the 2018 Asian Games.
