= Bilal Hussein =

Bilal Hussein may refer to:

- Bilal Hussein (photojournalist)
- Bilal Hussein (footballer)

== See also ==
- Bilal Hussain (cricketer), Pakistani cricketer
