= Ramin Taheri =

Iranian Greco-Roman wrestler

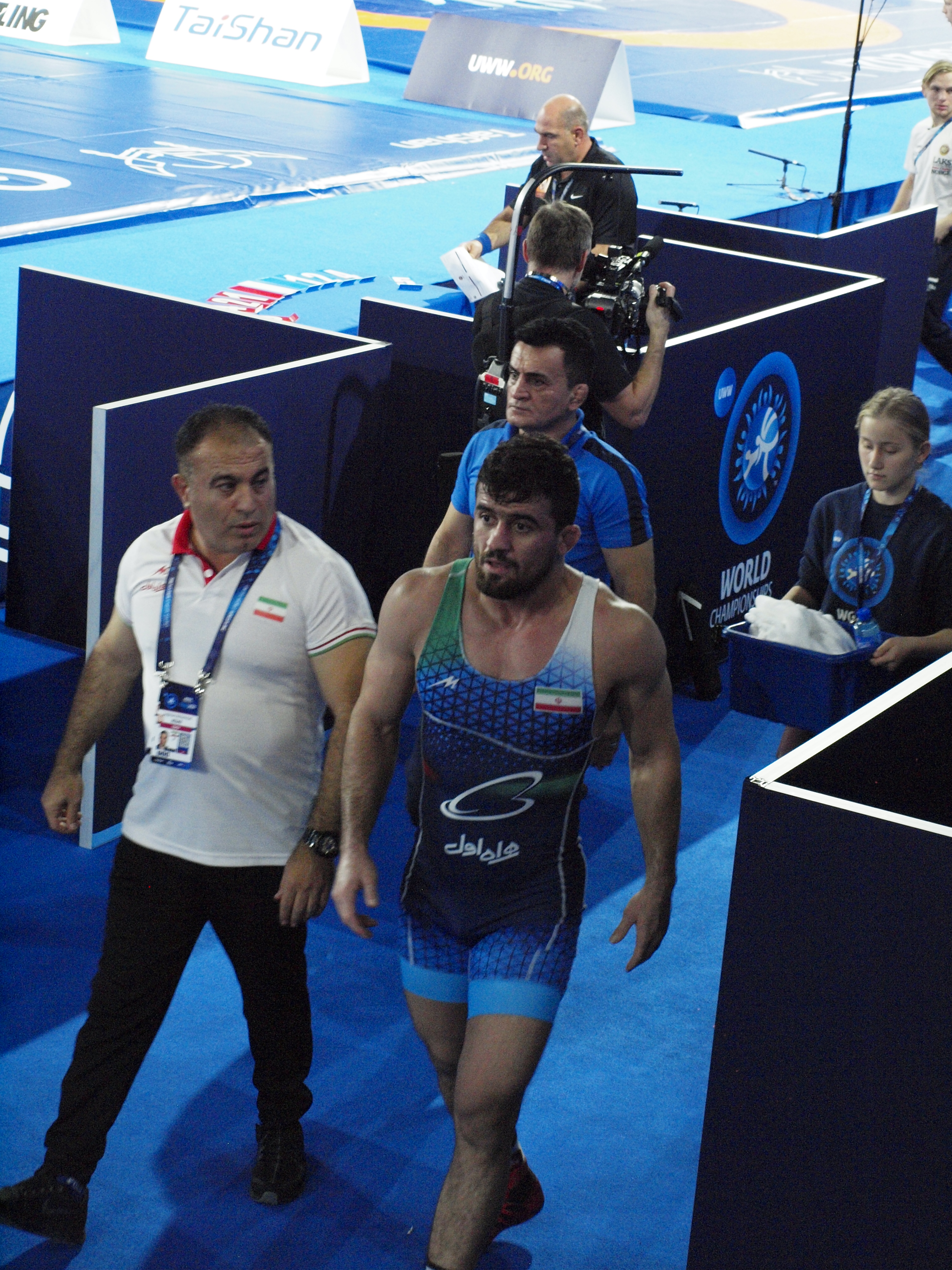
- 2021 World Wrestling Championships

Personal information
- Native name: رامین طاهری
- Nationality: Iranian
- Born: 23 October 1994 (age 31) Izeh, Iran

Sport
- Country: Iran
- Sport: Greco-Roman wrestling
- Weight class: 87 kg
Medal record
Men's Greco-Roman wrestling
Representing Iran
Asian Championships
| Gold medal – first place | 2015 Doha | 71 kg |
| Gold medal – first place | 2016 Bangkok | 80 kg |
| Gold medal – first place | 2017 New Delhi | 80 kg |
Islamic Solidarity Games
| Silver medal – second place | 2021 Konya | 87 kg |
Bolat Turlykhanov Cup
| Gold medal – first place | 2022 Almaty | 87 kg |

Ramin Taheri (Persian: رامین طاهری) is an Iranian Greco-Roman wrestler. He presented in the 87 kg event at the 2021 World Wrestling Championships held in Oslo, Norway.

He won 3 gold medals in Asian Wrestling Championships.
