= Azamat Kustubayev =

Kazakhstani Greco-Roman wrestler

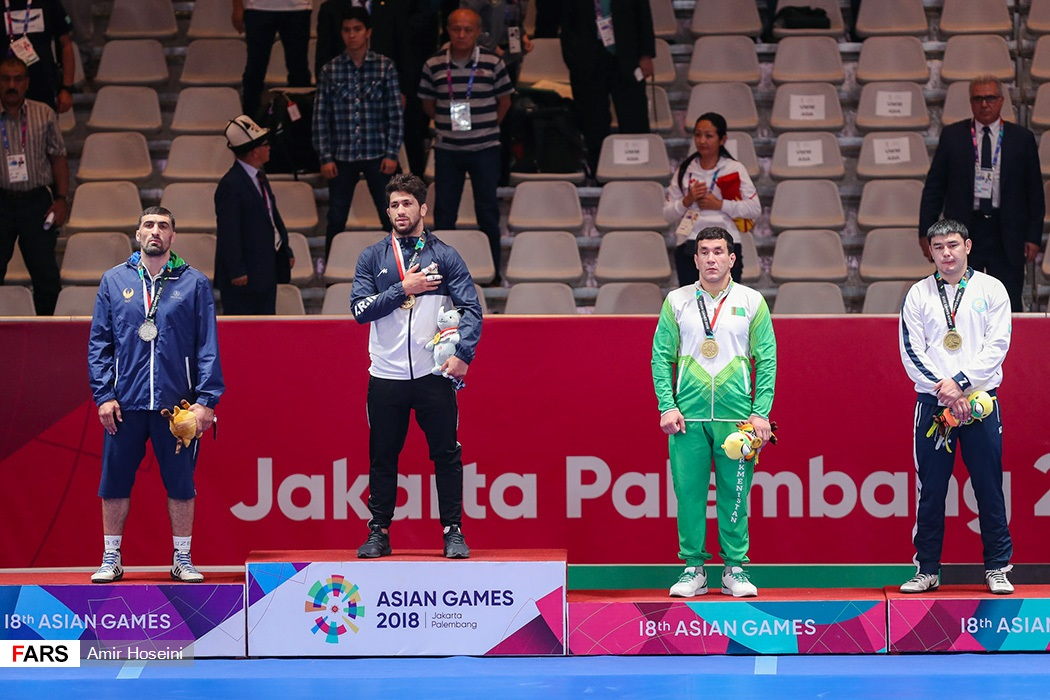
- Azamat Kustubayev (2018, far right)

Sport
- Country: Kazakhstan
- Sport: Amateur wrestling
- Weight class: 87 kg
- Event: Greco-Roman
Medal record
Men's Greco-Roman wrestling
Representing Kazakhstan
Asian Games
Bronze medal – third place	2018 Jakarta	87 kg
Asian Championships
Bronze medal – third place	2014 Astana	80 kg
Bronze medal – third place	2019 Xi'an	87 kg
Bronze medal – third place	2020 New Delhi	87 kg

Azamat Kustubayev is a Kazakhstani Greco-Roman wrestler. He won one of the bronze medals in the 87 kg event at the 2018 Asian Games held in Jakarta, Indonesia.

In 2019, he won the bronze medal in the 87 kg event at the Asian Wrestling Championships held in Xi'an, China. He repeated this at the 2020 Asian Wrestling Championships held in New Delhi, India.

== Achievements ==
Year	Tournament	Location	Result	Event
2014	Asian Championships	Astana, Kazakhstan	3rd	Greco-Roman 80 kg
2018	Asian Games	Jakarta, Indonesia	3rd	Greco-Roman 87 kg
2019	Asian Championships	Xi'an, China	3rd	Greco-Roman 87 kg
2020	Asian Championships	New Delhi, India	3rd	Greco-Roman 87 kg
