= Magomed Musaev =

Russian-Kyrgyzstani wrestler (born 1989)

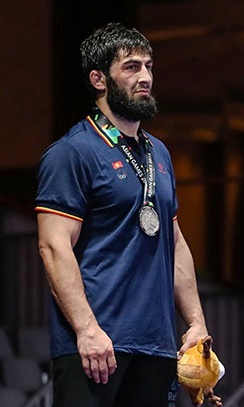
- Musaev at the 2018 Asian Games

Personal information
- Native name: Магомед Мусаев
- Born: 11 March 1989 (age 37) Malgobek, Chechen-Ingushetia, Russian SFSR, Soviet Union
- Height: 180 cm (5 ft 11 in)

Sport
- Sport: Freestyle wrestling
- Club: Berkut, Bishkek
- Coached by: Ruslan Madzhinov
Medal record
Representing Kyrgyzstan
Asian Games
Silver medal – second place	2014 Incheon	97 kg
Silver medal – second place	2018 Jakarta	97 kg
Asian Championships
Gold medal – first place	2012 Gumi	96 kg
Silver medal – second place	2014 Astana	97 kg
Silver medal – second place	2015 Doha	97 kg
Silver medal – second place	2016 Bangkok	97 kg
Bronze medal – third place	2017 New Delhi	97 kg

Magomed Savarbekovich Musaev (Russian: Магомед Саварбекович Мусаев; born 11 March 1989) is a Russian-Kyrgyzstani heavyweight freestyle wrestler of Ingush origin. He competed at the 2012 and 2016 Olympics and placed seventh and ninth, respectively. Musaev won silver medals at the 2014 and 2018 Asian Games.

Musaev has degrees from the Kyrgyz State University of Physical Education and the Moscow Institute of Entrepreneurship and Law. He took up Greco-Roman wrestling at age 14, and later changed to freestyle.
