= Muslim Evloev =

Russian-Kyrgyzstani freestyle wrestler (1995–2020)

Personal information
- Born: 11 June 1995 Malgobek, Russia
- Died: 6 August 2020 (aged 25) Nazran, Russia

Sport
- Country: Kyrgyzstan
- Sport: Amateur wrestling
- Weight class: 74 kg
- Event: Freestyle
Medal record
Men's freestyle wrestling
Representing Kyrgyzstan
Asian Championships
Gold medal – first place	2018 Bishkek	74 kg
Silver medal – second place	2017 New Delhi	74 kg
Islamic Solidarity Games
Gold medal – first place	2017 Baku	74 kg

Muslim Evloev (11 June 1995 – 6 August 2020) was a Russian-Kyrgyzstani freestyle wrestler. He won a gold medal in the men's 74 kg event at the Asian Wrestling Championships and at the Islamic Solidarity Games.

== Career ==
In 2017, Evloev won the gold medal in the men's 74 kg event at the Islamic Solidarity Games held in Baku, Azerbaijan. In the final, he defeated Soner Demirtaş of Turkey. In that same year, he also competed in the men's 74 kg event at the 2017 Asian Indoor and Martial Arts Games held in Ashgabat, Turkmenistan without winning a medal. He was eliminated in his second match by Döwletmyrat Orazgylyjow of Turkmenistan.

In 2018, Evloev won the gold medal in the men's 74 kg event at the Asian Wrestling Championships held in Bishkek, Kyrgyzstan. In the final, he defeated Ganzorigiin Mandakhnaran of Mongolia. A year earlier, he won the silver medal in this event after losing against Bekzod Abdurakhmonov of Uzbekistan.

Evloev failed an out of competition drug test in July 2018 and was banned from competitive sports until August 2022.

He was killed in August 2020 during a shoot out in a counter-terrorism operation in Nazran, Russia.

== Achievements ==
Year	Tournament	Location	Result	Event
2017	Asian Championships	New Delhi, India	2nd	Freestyle 74 kg
2017	Islamic Solidarity Games	Baku, Azerbaijan	1st	Freestyle 74 kg
2018	Asian Championships	Bishkek, Kyrgyzstan	1st	Freestyle 74 kg
