= Kim Ji-hun (wrestler) =

South Korean Greco-Roman wrestler

Kim Ji-Hun
Personal information
- Full name: Kim Ji-Hun
- Nationality: South Korea
- Born: 3 January 1992 (age 34) South Korea
- Weight: 66 kg (146 lb)

Korean name
- Hangul: 김지훈
- RR: Gim Jihun
- MR: Kim Chihun

Sport
- Sport: Wrestling
- Event: Greco-Roman
Medal record
Men's Greco-Roman wrestling
Representing South Korea
Asian Championships
Gold medal – first place	2013 New Delhi	66 kg

Kim Ji-Hun (born 3 January 1992) is a South Korean Greco-Roman wrestler who won the gold medal in the 66 kg weight division at the 2013 Asian Wrestling Championships. In the final he defeated Mehdi Zeidvand of Iran 1–0, 1–0.
