= Wrestling in Armenia =

Wrestling (Armenian: ըմբշամարտ, pronounced [əmbʃɑmɑɾt]) has deep historical roots in Armenia. Wrestling was practiced in the Armenian Highlands since ancient times. Armenians have their own variant of the sport called Kokh. It was recorded that King Tiridates III of Armenia won the Ancient Olympic Games in wrestling in 281 AD. During the Soviet era, wrestling became one of the most practiced sports in Armenia and remained popular after Armenia's independence in 1991. Armenian athletes have been successful at international competitions in the last two decades. Many have become World and European champions, both in Greco-Roman and Freestyle wrestling. Over half of the fifteen Armenian Olympic medalists and the two gold medal winners have been wrestlers. The sport is overseen by the Wrestling Federation of Armenia.

== History ==
=== Ancient history ===
At the 265th Olympiad (281 AD) the Armenian King Tiridates III (286–342 AD), who in 301 AD adopted Christianity as the state religion, making Armenia the first Christian nation, became an Olympic Champion in wrestling.

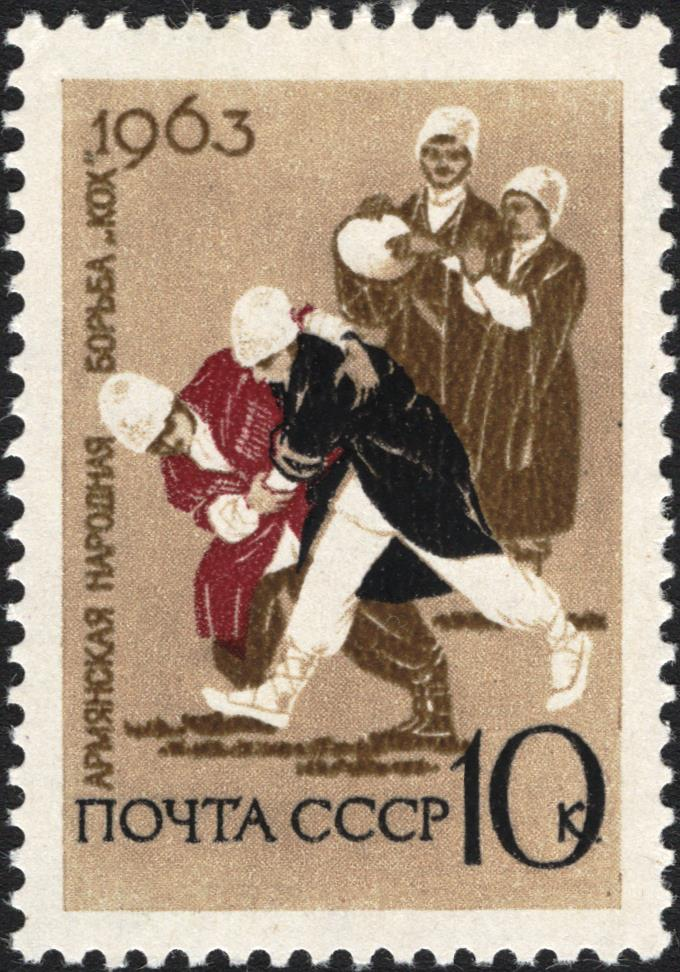
A 1963 Soviet stamp depicting traditional Armenian Kokh

=== Kokh ===
Kokh (Armenian: Կոխ) is the Armenian national wrestling, known since the Early Middle Ages. It's considered to be one of the oldest forms of wrestling. It had influenced the Soviet martial sport Sambo.

The winner is the one who throws the opponent on the mat without boosting and/or turning him. Pushing the opponent out of the mat, which has a radius of 7–9 meters, also results in winning. A Kokh fight usually lasts from 5 to 10 minutes. The Kokh fights are often accompanied with Armenian folk music and before the beginning of a fight wrestlers do folk dances.

Two varieties of Kokh are Lori Kokh and Shirak Kokh. The main difference between two styles is between the clothing. In Shirak Kokh, wrestlers wear shalvar pants and are topless and were allowed to grab the legs of the opponent. In Lori Kokh, they wear chokha (traditional Caucasian costume) and have to grab the opponent's dress to throw or push them out. Until the late 1980s, Kokh was practiced in rural areas of Armenia, although no professional Kokh athletes existed. Today, about 700 children in Armenia practice Kokh.

=== Soviet period ===
Sports in general and wrestling, particularly, became popular in Armenia in the 1920s and 1930s, but it wasn't until the end of the World War II, when Armenian and Soviet athletes started to appear on international competitions. Sargis Vardanyan became the Soviet champion of Greco-Roman wrestling twice, in 1940 and 1944. In later years, Armenian Greco-Roman wrestlers had significant role in Soviet wrestling. Notable ones included Ruben Karapetyan (1969 first junior world champion), Artem Teryan (First wrestling Olympic medalist), Suren Nalbandyan (1976 Olympic champion), Sanasar Oganisyan (1980 Olympic champion), Norayr Musheghian (1958 World Champion), Benur Pashayan (1982 and 1983 World Champion), Levon Julfalakyan (1986 World Champion), Mnatsakan Iskandaryan (1990, 1991, 1994 World Champion).

=== Independent Armenia ===
The Federation of Freestyle Wrestling of Armenia and the Federation of Greco-Roman Wrestling Federation were founded in 1992 and were merged in 1996 forming the Wrestling Federation of Armenia. It is the national governing body of the sport in the country. According to Razmik Stepanyan, secretary of the Armenian Olympic Committee, as of 2009, there were 25 wrestling schools in 10 provinces of Armenia, 304 coaches and 7,454 athletes practicing wrestling.

In 2021, government statistics showed 7,800 wrestlers in Armenia, including 4,000 in freestyle wrestling and 3,800 Greco-Roman wrestling. There were over 700 coaches and trainers in both. A little more than 1,000 people practiced Sambo and 126 practiced Kokh.

== Records ==
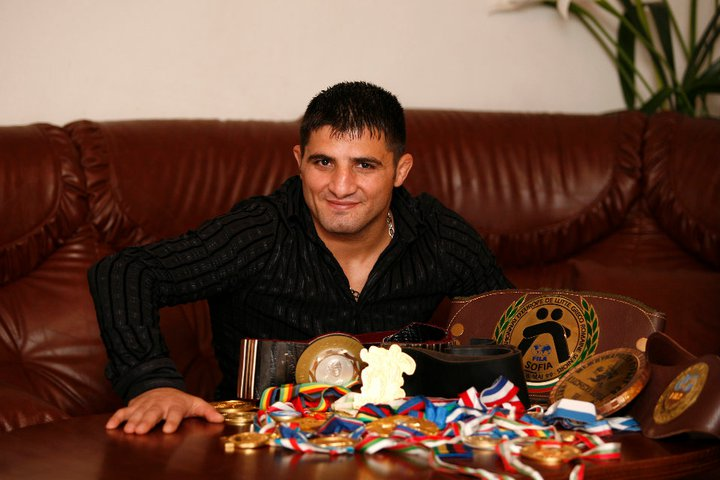
Wrestler Armen Nazaryan is Armenia's first Olympic champion

=== Olympics ===
9 of the 18 Olympic medals of Armenia are from wrestling.

Games	Athlete	Style and weight	Position	Ref
(United States) 1996 Atlanta	Armen Nazaryan	Greco-Roman 52 kg	Gold	
(United States) 1996 Atlanta	Armen Mkrtchyan	Freestyle 48 kg	Silver	
(China) 2008 Beijing	Roman Amoyan	Greco-Roman 55 kg	Bronze	
(China) 2008 Beijing	Yury Patrikeyev	Greco-Roman 120 kg	Bronze	
(United Kingdom) 2012 London	Arsen Julfalakyan	Greco-Roman 74 kg	Silver	
(United Kingdom) 2012 London	Artur Aleksanyan	Greco-Roman 96 kg	Bronze	
(Brazil) 2016 Rio	Migran Arutyunyan	Greco-Roman 66 kg	Silver	
(Brazil) 2016 Rio	Artur Aleksanyan	Greco-Roman 98 kg	Gold	
(Japan) 2020 Tokyo	Artur Aleksanyan	Greco-Roman 97 kg	Silver	
(France) 2024 Paris	Artur Aleksanyan	Greco-Roman 97 kg	Silver	
(France) 2024 Paris	Malkhas Amoyan	Greco-Roman 77 kg	Bronze	

=== World Championships ===
==== Greco-Roman ====
Year	Athlete	Weight	Position	Ref
(Sweden) 1993 Stockholm	Armen Nazaryan	52 kg	Silver	
(Sweden) 1993 Stockholm	Aghasi Manukyan	57 kg	Gold	
(Czech Republic) 1995 Prague	Armen Nazaryan	52 kg	Silver	
(Czech Republic) 1995 Prague	Mkhitar Manukyan	62 kg	Bronze	
(Poland) 1997 Wrocław	Vahan Juharyan	54 kg	Silver	
(Greece) 2001 Patras	Karen Mnatsakanyan	58 kg	Silver	
(Greece) 2001 Patras	Vaghinak Galstyan	63 kg	Gold	
(Azerbaijan) 2007 Baku	Yury Patrikeyev	120 kg	Bronze	
(Denmark) 2009 Herning	Roman Amoyan	55 kg	Silver	
(Russia) 2010 Moscow	Roman Amoyan	55 kg	Bronze	
(Russia) 2010 Moscow	Arsen Julfalakyan	74 kg	Silver	
(Russia) 2010 Moscow	Yury Patrikeyev	120 kg	Silver	
(Turkey) 2011 Istanbul	Arsen Julfalakyan	74 kg	Bronze	
(Hungary) 2013 Budapest	Roman Amoyan	55 kg	Bronze	
(Hungary) 2013 Budapest	Arsen Julfalakyan	74 kg	Bronze	
(Hungary) 2013 Budapest	Artur Aleksanyan	96 kg	Silver	
(Uzbekistan) 2014 Tashkent	Arsen Julfalakyan	75 kg	Gold	
(Uzbekistan) 2014 Tashkent	Artur Aleksanyan	98 kg	Gold	
(United States) 2015 Las Vegas	Artur Aleksanyan	98 kg	Gold	
(France) 2017 Paris	Maksim Manukyan	80 kg	Gold	
(France) 2017 Paris	Artur Aleksanyan	98 kg	Gold	
(Hungary) 2018 Budapest	Maksim Manukyan	82 kg	Bronze	
(Hungary) 2018 Budapest	Artur Shahinyan	87 kg	Bronze	
(Kazakhstan) 2019 Nur-Sultan	Slavik Galstyan	63 kg	Bronze	
(Kazakhstan) 2019 Nur-Sultan	Artur Aleksanyan	97 kg	Silver	
(Norway) 2021 Oslo	Malkhas Amoyan	72 kg	Gold	
(Serbia) 2022 Belgrade	Artur Aleksanyan	97 kg	Gold	
(Serbia) 2022 Belgrade	Malkhas Amoyan	77 kg	Bronze	
(Serbia) 2023 Belgrade	Malkhas Amoyan	77 kg	Bronze	
(Serbia) 2023 Belgrade	Artur Aleksanyan	97 kg	Silver	
(Albania) 2024 Tirana	Karen Aslanyan	63 kg	Bronze	
(Croatia) 2025 Zagreb	Malkhas Amoyan	77 kg	Gold	
(Croatia) 2025 Zagreb	Hrachya Poghosyan	60 kg	Bronze	
(Croatia) 2025 Zagreb	Slavik Galstyan	67 kg	Bronze	
(Kazakhstan) 2026 Astana	Karen Aslanyan	63 kg	Gold	
(Kazakhstan) 2026 Astana	Gevorg Tadevosyan	87 kg	Bronze	

==== Freestyle ====
Year	Athlete	Weight	Position	Ref
(United States) 1995 Atlanta	Armen Mkrtchyan	48 kg	Bronze	
(United States) 1995 Atlanta	Arayik Gevorgyan	68 kg	Gold	
(Russia) 1997 Krasnoyarsk	Arayik Gevorgyan	69 kg	Gold	
(Iran) 1998 Tehran	Arayik Gevorgyan	69 kg	Gold	
(Iran) 2002 Tehran	Aram Margaryan	60 kg	Gold	
(Hungary) 2005 Budapest	Martin Berberyan	60 kg	Bronze	
(China) 2006 Guangzhou	Ruslan Basiev	120 kg	Bronze	
(Hungary) 2013 Budapest	David Safaryan	66 kg	Gold	
(France) 2017 Paris	Georgy Ketoyev	97 kg	Bronze	
(France) 2017 Paris	Levan Berianidze	125 kg	Bronze	
(Norway) 2021 Oslo	Arsen Harutyunyan (wrestler)	61 kg	Bronze	
(Serbia) 2022 Belgrade	Arsen Harutyunyan (wrestler)	61 kg	Bronze	
(Serbia) 2023 Belgrade	Arsen Harutyunyan (wrestler)	57 kg	Bronze	
(Serbia) 2023 Belgrade	Vazgen Tevanyan	65 kg	Bronze	
(Serbia) 2023 Belgrade	Arman Andreasyan	70 kg	Bronze	
(Croatia) 2025 Zagreb	Arsen Harutyunyan	57 kg	Bronze	

=== European Championships ===
==== Greco-Roman ====
Year	Athlete	Weight	Position	Ref
(Greece) 1994 Athens	Armen Nazaryan	52 kg	Gold	
(Greece) 1994 Athens	Aghasi Manukyan	62 kg	Silver	
(France) 1995 Besançon	Armen Nazaryan	52 kg	Gold	
(France) 1995 Besançon	Aghasi Manukyan	57 kg	Silver	
(Hungary) 1996 Budapest	Armen Nazaryan	52 kg	Silver	
(Hungary) 1996 Budapest	Mkhitar Manukyan	62 kg	Bronze	
(Finland) 1997 Kouvola	Karen Mnatsakanyan	58 kg	Gold	
(Bulgaria) 1999 Sofia	Karen Mnatsakanyan	58 kg	Bronze	
(Russia) 2000 Moscow	Movses Karapetyan	69 kg	Bronze	
(Turkey) 2001 Istanbul	Movses Karapetyan	69 kg	Bronze	
(Socialist Federal Republic of Yugoslavia) 2003 Belgrade	Roman Amoyan	55 kg	Silver	
(Socialist Federal Republic of Yugoslavia) 2003 Belgrade	Levon Geghamyan	84 kg	Silver	
(Sweden) 2004 Haparanda	Vahan Juharyan	60 kg	Gold	
(Bulgaria) 2005 Varna	Roman Amoyan	55 kg	Silver	
(Bulgaria) 2005 Varna	Movses Karapetyan	74 kg	Gold	
(Russia) 2006 Moscow	Roman Amoyan	55 kg	Gold	
(Russia) 2006 Moscow	Karen Mnatsakanyan	60 kg	Gold	
(Russia) 2006 Moscow	Denis Forov	84 kg	Silver	
(Finland) 2008 Tampere	Roman Amoyan	55 kg	Silver	
(Finland) 2008 Tampere	Yury Patrikeyev	120 kg	Gold	
(Lithuania) 2009 Vilnius	Arsen Julfalakyan	74 kg	Gold	
(Lithuania) 2009 Vilnius	Yury Patrikeyev	120 kg	Gold	
(Germany) 2011 Dortmund	Roman Amoyan	55 kg	Gold	
(Germany) 2011 Dortmund	Artur Shahinyan	84 kg	Bronze	
(Germany) 2011 Dortmund	Artur Aleksanyan	96 kg	Silver	
(Germany) 2011 Dortmund	Yury Patrikeyev	96 kg	Bronze	
(Serbia) 2012 Belgrade	Arsen Julfalakyan	74 kg	Bronze	
(Serbia) 2012 Belgrade	Artur Aleksanyan	96 kg	Gold	
(Serbia) 2012 Belgrade	Yury Patrikeyev	120 kg	Bronze	
(Georgia (country)) 2013 Tbilisi	Artur Aleksanyan	96 kg	Gold	
(Georgia (country)) 2013 Tbilisi	Vachik Yeghiazaryan	120 kg	Bronze	
(Georgia (country)) 2013 Tbilisi	Artur Shahinyan	84 kg	Bronze	
(Finland) 2014 Vantaa	Arsen Julfalakyan	75 kg	Silver	
(Finland) 2014 Vantaa	Artur Aleksanyan	98 kg	Gold	
(Latvia) 2016 Riga	Varsham Boranyan	71 kg	Gold	
(Latvia) 2016 Riga	Roman Amoyan	59 kg	Silver	
(Latvia) 2016 Riga	Karapet Chalyan	75 kg	Bronze	
(Latvia) 2016 Riga	Artur Aleksanyan	98 kg	Silver	
(Serbia) 2017 Novi Sad	Artur Aleksanyan	98 kg	Bronze	
(Russia) 2018 Kaspiysk	Karen Aslanyan	67 kg	Bronze	
(Russia) 2018 Kaspiysk	Maksim Manukyan	82 kg	Gold	
(Russia) 2018 Kaspiysk	Artur Aleksanyan	97 kg	Gold	
(Romania) 2019 Bucharest	Karen Aslanyan	67 kg	Bronze	
(Romania) 2019 Bucharest	Arsen Julfalakyan	77 kg	Bronze	
(Italy) 2020 Rome	Gevorg Gharibyan	60 kg	Gold	
(Italy) 2020 Rome	Karen Aslanyan	67 kg	Bronze	
(Italy) 2020 Rome	Karapet Chalyan	77 kg	Bronze	
(Italy) 2020 Rome	Artur Aleksanyan	97 kg	Gold	
(Poland) 2021 Warsaw	Rudik Mkrtchyan	55 kg	Bronze	
(Poland) 2021 Warsaw	Slavik Galstyan	67 kg	Bronze	
(Poland) 2021 Warsaw	Malkhas Amoyan	72 kg	Silver	
(Hungary) 2022 Budapest	Rudik Mkrtchyan	55 kg	Bronze	
(Hungary) 2022 Budapest	Gevorg Gharibyan	60 kg	Bronze	
(Hungary) 2022 Budapest	Slavik Galstyan	67 kg	Bronze	
(Hungary) 2022 Budapest	Malkhas Amoyan	77 kg	Gold	
(Hungary) 2022 Budapest	Malkhas Amoyan	77 kg	Gold	
(Croatia) 2023 Zagreb	Hrachya Poghosyan	63 kg	Bronze	
(Croatia) 2023 Zagreb	Malkhas Amoyan	77 kg	Gold	
(Croatia) 2023 Zagreb	Artur Aleksanyan	97 kg	Gold	
(Romania) 2024 Bucharest	Manvel Khachatryan	55 kg	Bronze	
(Romania) 2024 Bucharest	Malkhas Amoyan	77 kg	Gold	
(Romania) 2024 Bucharest	Artur Aleksanyan	97 kg	Gold	
(Slovakia) 2025 Bratislava	Karen Aslanyan	63 kg	Silver	
(Slovakia) 2025 Bratislava	Malkhas Amoyan	77 kg	Gold	
(Albania) 2026 Tirana	Suren Aghajanyan	60 kg	Silver	
(Albania) 2026 Tirana	Karen Aslanyan	63 kg	Bronze	
(Albania) 2026 Tirana	Slavik Galstyan	67 kg	Bronze	
(Albania) 2026 Tirana	Gaspar Terteryan	72 kg	Bronze	
(Albania) 2026 Tirana	Malkhas Amoyan	77 kg	Gold	

==== Freestyle ====
Year	Athlete	Weight	Position	Ref
(Turkey) 1993 Istanbul	Arayik Gevorgyan	68 kg	Silver	
(Italy) 1994 Rome	Armen Mkrtchyan	48 kg	Gold	
(Italy) 1994 Rome	Anushavan Sahakyan	57 kg	Gold	
(Italy) 1994 Rome	Araik Baghdadyan	62 kg	Silver	
(Italy) 1994 Rome	Arayik Gevorgyan	68 kg	Silver	
(Switzerland) 1995 Fribourg	Arayik Gevorgyan	68 kg	Bronze	
(Hungary) 1996 Budapest	Armen Mkrtchyan	48 kg	Silver	
(Hungary) 1996 Budapest	Arayik Gevorgyan	68 kg	Silver	
(Poland) 1997 Warsaw	Arayik Gevorgyan	69 kg	Gold	
(Slovenia) 1998 Bratislava	Arayik Gevorgyan	76 kg	Silver	
(Hungary) 2001 Budapest	Armen Mkrtchyan	54 kg	Bronze	
(Latvia) 2003 Riga	Mahmed Aghaev	84 kg	Silver	
(Turkey) 2004 Ankara	Martin Berberyan	55 kg	Gold	
(Russia) 2006 Moscow	Ruslan Kokaev	74 kg	Silver	
(Russia) 2006 Moscow	Vadim Laliev	84 kg	Bronze	
(Russia) 2006 Moscow	Shamil Gitinov	96 kg	Silver	
(Bulgaria) 2007 Sofia	Shamil Gitinov	96 kg	Bronze	
(Lithuania) 2009 Vilnius	Zhirayr Hovhannisyan	66 kg	Bronze	
(Lithuania) 2009 Vilnius	Edgar Yenokyan	96 kg	Bronze	
(Lithuania) 2009 Vilnius	Ruslan Basiev	120 kg	Silver	
(Germany) 2011 Dortmund	Musa Murtazaliev	74 kg	Silver	
(Serbia) 2012 Belgrade	David Safaryan	66 kg	Bronze	
(Georgia (country)) 2013 Tbilisi	David Safaryan	66 kg	Gold	
(Georgia (country)) 2013 Tbilisi	Musa Murtazaliev	84 kg	Silver	
(Finland) 2014 Vantaa	Garik Barseghyan	57 kg	Bronze	
(North Macedonia) 2021 Skopje	Razmik Papikyan	61 kg	Silver	
(Finland) 2014 Vantaa	Musa Murtazaliev	86 kg	Bronze	
(Serbia) 2017 Novi Sad	Valodya Frangulyan	61 kg	Bronze	
(Serbia) 2017 Novi Sad	Grigor Grigoryan	74 kg	Bronze	
(Serbia) 2017 Novi Sad	Levan Berianidze	125 kg	Bronze	
(Romania) 2019 Bucharest	Arsen Harutyunyan	61 kg	Gold	
(Italy) 2020 Rome	Arsen Harutyunyan	61 kg	Bronze	
(Poland) 2021 Warsaw	Arman Andreasyan	70 kg	Bronze	
(Hungary) 2022 Budapest	Manvel Khndzrtsyan	57 kg	Bronze	
(Hungary) 2022 Budapest	Arsen Harutyunyan	61 kg	Gold	
(Hungary) 2022 Budapest	Arman Andreasyan	70 kg	Silver	
(Croatia) 2023 Zagreb	Arsen Harutyunyan	61 kg	Gold	
(Croatia) 2023 Zagreb	Vazgen Tevanyan	65 kg	Gold	
(Romania) 2024 Bucharest	Arsen Harutyunyan	57 kg	Gold	
(Romania) 2024 Bucharest	Mezhlum Mezhlumyan	61 kg	Bronze	
(Romania) 2024 Bucharest	Arman Andreasyan	70 kg	Gold	
(Slovakia) 2025 Bratislava	Arsen Harutyunyan	61 kg	Silver	
(Slovakia) 2025 Bratislava	Vazgen Tevanyan	65 kg	Bronze	
(Slovakia) 2025 Bratislava	Arman Andreasyan	70 kg	Silver	
(Albania) 2026 Tirana	Manvel Khndzrtsyan	57 kg	Bronze	
(Albania) 2026 Tirana	Arsen Harutyunyan	61 kg	Bronze	
(Albania) 2026 Tirana	Vazgen Tevanyan	65 kg	Bronze	

=== European Championships (Women) ===
Year	Athlete	Style and weight	Position	Ref
(Russia) 2006 Moscow	Karine Shadoyan	Freestyle 72 kg	Bronze	

=== World Cup ===
Year	Position	Style	Member athletes	Ref
(France) 2009 Clermont-Ferrand	Bronze	Greco-Roman		
(Armenia) 2010 Yerevan	Bronze	Greco-Roman	55 kg: Roman Amoyan (gold) & Harutyun Hovhannisyan; 60 kg: Artak Harutyunyan & Vahan Juharyan; 66 kg: Arman Adikyan (silver) & Hovhannes Varderesyan; 74 kg: Varsham Boranyan & Arsen Julfalakyan (gold); 84 kg: Denis Forov & Tigran Sahakyan; 96 kg: Arman Geghamyan (silver) & Sargis Tonoyan; 120 kg: Yury Patrikeyev (gold) & Vachik Yeghiazaryan	

== See also ==
- Mas-Wrestling Federation of Armenia
