= 2026 European Wrestling Championships – Men's Greco-Roman 77 kg =

Men's Greco-Roman 77 kg at the 2026 European Wrestling Championships
- Venue: Tirana Olympic Park
- Location: Tirana, Albania
- Dates: 20–21 April
- Competitors: 21 from 19 nations

Medalists
gold medal	Malkhas Amoyan	Armenia
silver medal	Ramaz Zoidze	Georgia
bronze medal	Róbert Fritsch	Hungary
bronze medal	Hugo Baff	Sweden

The men's Greco-Roman 77 kilograms competition at the 2026 European Wrestling Championships was held from 20 to 21 April 2026 at the Tirana Olympic Park in Tirana, Albania.

== Results ==
Legend

- F — Won by fall

=== Final ===
Final
Ramaz Zoidze (GEO)	1
Malkhas Amoyan (ARM)	1

=== Top half ===
Round of 32
Stoyan Kubatov (BUL)	1
Shuai Mamedau (UWW)	1
Tigran Galustyan (FRA)	6
Giovanni Alessio (ITA)	1
Marcos Sánchez-Silva (ESP)	2
Ramaz Zoidze (GEO)	8

Round of 16
Róbert Fritsch (HUN)	4
Kevin Kupi (ALB)	0
Shuai Mamedau (UWW)	0
Sanan Suleymanov (AZE)	9
Aleksa Ilić (SRB)	6
Tigran Galustyan (FRA)	5
Ramaz Zoidze (GEO)	9
Antonio Kamenjašević (CRO)	3

Quarterfinals
Róbert Fritsch (HUN)	6
Sanan Suleymanov (AZE)	5
Aleksa Ilić (SRB)	2
Ramaz Zoidze (GEO)	5

Semifinals
Róbert Fritsch (HUN)	0
Ramaz Zoidze (GEO)	8

=== Bottom half ===
Round of 32
Mateusz Bernatek (POL)	0
Alexandrin Guțu (MDA)	4
Samuel Bellscheidt (GER)	5
Sergey Stepanov (UWW)	4

Round of 16
Ahmet Yılmaz (TUR)	4
Akseli Yli-Hannuksela (FIN)	0
Alexandrin Guțu (MDA)	10
Vilius Savickas (LTU)	0
Irfan Mirzoiev (UKR)	10
Samuel Bellscheidt (GER)	1
Hugo Baff (SWE)	0
Malkhas Amoyan (ARM)	4

Quarterfinals
Ahmet Yılmaz (TUR)	2
Alexandrin Guțu (MDA)	10
Irfan Mirzoiev (UKR)	0
Malkhas Amoyan (ARM)	10

Semifinals
Alexandrin Guțu (MDA)	1
Malkhas Amoyan (ARM)	3

=== Repechage ===
Repechage round 1
Marcos Sánchez-Silva (ESP)	2
Antonio Kamenjašević (CRO)	8

Repechage round 2
Antonio Kamenjašević (CRO)	2
Aleksa Ilić (SRB)	1
Hugo Baff (SWE)	7
Irfan Mirzoiev (UKR)	3

Bronze medal matches
Antonio Kamenjašević (CRO)	1
Róbert Fritsch (HUN)	1
Hugo Baff (SWE)	2
Alexandrin Guțu (MDA)	1

== Final standing ==
Rank	Wrestler
1st place, gold medalist(s)	Malkhas Amoyan (ARM)
2nd place, silver medalist(s)	Ramaz Zoidze (GEO)
3rd place, bronze medalist(s)	Róbert Fritsch (HUN)
3rd place, bronze medalist(s)	Hugo Baff (SWE)
5	Antonio Kamenjašević (CRO)
5	Alexandrin Guțu (MDA)
7	Sanan Suleymanov (AZE)
8	Irfan Mirzoiev (UKR)
9	Aleksa Ilić (SRB)
10	Tigran Galustyan (FRA)
11	Ahmet Yılmaz (TUR)
12	Samuel Bellscheidt (GER)
13	Shuai Mamedau (UWW)
14	Marcos Sánchez-Silva (ESP)
15	Sergey Stepanov (UWW)
16	Stoyan Kubatov (BUL)
17	Giovanni Alessio (ITA)
18	Kevin Kupi (ALB)
19	Akseli Yli-Hannuksela (FIN)
20	Mateusz Bernatek (POL)
21	Vilius Savickas (LTU)
