= 2026 World Wrestling Championships – Men's Greco-Roman 77 kg =

Wrestling competition

Men's Greco-Roman 77 kg at the 2026 World Championships
- Venue: Barys Arena
- Dates: 24–25 October 2026
- Competitors: 31 from 31 nations

Medalists
gold medal	Sanan Suleymanov	Azerbaijan
silver medal	Alexandrin Guțu	Moldova
bronze medal	Ali Oskoo	Iran
bronze medal	Shuai Mamedau	Belarus

The men's Greco-Roman 77 kilograms is a competition featured at the 2026 World Wrestling Championships, and was held in Astana, Kazakhstan on 24 and 25 October 2026.

This Greco-Roman wrestling competition consists of a single-elimination tournament, with a repechage used to determine the winner of two bronze medals. The two finalists face off for gold and silver medals. Each wrestler who loses to one of the two finalists moves into the repechage, culminating in a pair of bronze medal matches, featuring the semifinal losers each facing the remaining repechage opponent from their half of the bracket.

== Results ==
Legend

- F — Won by fall

=== Final ===
Final
Sanan Suleymanov (AZE)	8
Alexandrin Guțu (MDA)	3

=== Top half ===
Round of 32
Ibrahim Ghanem (FRA)	4
Hu Wenhao (CHN)	0
Yryskeldi Maksatbek Uulu (KGZ)	6
Samuel Bellscheidt (GER)	3
Rokas Čepauskas (LTU)	0
Ali Oskoo (IRI)	11
Sanan Suleymanov (AZE)	8
Isami Horikita (JPN)	0
David Choc (GUA)	1
Yao Lai-hsing (TPE)	3
Lovepreet Singh (IND)	0
Doniyorkhon Nakibov (UZB)	8
Jonni Sarkkinen (FIN)	5
Antonio Kamenjašević (CRO)	3

Round of 16
Róbert Fritsch (HUN)	6
Ibrahim Ghanem (FRA)	1
Yryskeldi Maksatbek Uulu (KGZ)	1
Ali Oskoo (IRI)	12
Sanan Suleymanov (AZE)	9
Yao Lai-hsing (TPE)	0
Doniyorkhon Nakibov (UZB)	7
Jonni Sarkkinen (FIN)	2

Quarterfinals
Róbert Fritsch (HUN)	1
Ali Oskoo (IRI)	5
Sanan Suleymanov (AZE)	5
Doniyorkhon Nakibov (UZB)	1

Semifinals
Ali Oskoo (IRI)	0
Sanan Suleymanov (AZE)	2

=== Bottom half ===
Round of 32
Ahmet Yılmaz (TUR)	6
Jair Cuero (COL)	0
Shuai Mamedau (BLR)	8
Chawki Doulache (ALG)	0
Ramaz Zoidze (GEO)	5
Hugo Baff (SWE)	0
Joílson Júnior (BRA)	0
Alexandrin Guțu (MDA)	8
Stoyan Kubatov (BUL)	3
Joel Adams (USA)	1
Ali Arsalan (SRB)	7
Oleh Khalilov (UKR)	3
Kang Hyeon-jin (KOR)	0
Merey Maulitkanov (KAZ)	9
Sergey Kutuzov (RUS)	1
Malkhas Amoyan (ARM)	1

Round of 16
Ahmet Yılmaz (TUR)	3
Shuai Mamedau (BLR)	4
Ramaz Zoidze (GEO)	2
Alexandrin Guțu (MDA)	6
Stoyan Kubatov (BUL)	10
Ali Arsalan (SRB)	1
Merey Maulitkanov (KAZ)	4
Malkhas Amoyan (ARM)	2

Quarterfinals
Shuai Mamedau (BLR)	4
Alexandrin Guțu (MDA)	6
Stoyan Kubatov (BUL)	4
Merey Maulitkanov (KAZ)	3

Semifinals
Alexandrin Guțu (MDA)	5^{F}
Stoyan Kubatov (BUL)	0

=== Repechage ===
Repechage round 1
Isami Horikita (JPN)	5
Yao Lai-hsing (TPE)	5
Joílson Júnior (BRA)	0
Ramaz Zoidze (GEO)	9

Repechage round 2
Isami Horikita (JPN)	1
Doniyorkhon Nakibov (UZB)	6
Ramaz Zoidze (GEO)	2
Shuai Mamedau (BLR)	3

Bronze medals
Doniyorkhon Nakibov (UZB)	3
Ali Oskoo (IRI)	4
Shuai Mamedau (BLR)	6^{F}
Stoyan Kubatov (BUL)	1

== Final standing ==
Rank	Athlete
1st place, gold medalist(s)	Sanan Suleymanov (AZE)
2nd place, silver medalist(s)	Alexandrin Guțu (MDA)
3rd place, bronze medalist(s)	Ali Oskoo (IRI)
3rd place, bronze medalist(s)	Shuai Mamedau (BLR)
5	Doniyorkhon Nakibov (UZB)
5	Stoyan Kubatov (BUL)
7	Ramaz Zoidze (GEO)
8	Merey Maulitkanov (KAZ)
9	Ahmet Yılmaz (TUR)
10	Ali Arsalan (SRB)
11	Yao Lai-hsing (TPE)
12	Róbert Fritsch (HUN)
13	Jonni Sarkkinen (FIN)
14	Yryskeldi Maksatbek Uulu (KGZ)
15	Isami Horikita (JPN)
16	Ibrahim Ghanem (FRA)
17	Malkhas Amoyan (ARM)
18	Antonio Kamenjašević (CRO)
19	Samuel Bellscheidt (GER)
20	Oleh Khalilov (UKR)
21	Sergey Kutuzov (RUS)
22	David Choc (GUA)
23	Joel Adams (USA)
24	Hu Wenhao (CHN)
25	Hugo Baff (SWE)
26	Jair Cuero (COL)
27	Lovepreet Singh (IND)
28	Chawki Doulache (ALG)
29	Kang Hyeon-jin (KOR)
30	Rokas Čepauskas (LTU)
31	Joílson Júnior (BRA)
