= 2025 World Wrestling Championships – Men's Greco-Roman 77 kg =

Wrestling competitions

Men's Greco-Roman 77 kg at the 2025 World Championships
- Venue: Arena Zagreb
- Dates: 18–19 September 2025
- Competitors: 33 from 31 nations

Medalists
gold medal	Malkhas Amoyan	Armenia
silver medal	Nao Kusaka	Japan
bronze medal	Róbert Fritsch	Hungary
bronze medal	Ahmet Yılmaz	Turkey

The men's Greco-Roman 77 kilograms is a competition featured at the 2025 World Wrestling Championships, and was held in Zagreb, Croatia on 18 and 19 September 2025.

This Greco-Roman wrestling competition consists of a single-elimination tournament, with a repechage used to determine the winner of two bronze medals. The two finalists face off for gold and silver medals. Each wrestler who loses to one of the two finalists moves into the repechage, culminating in a pair of bronze medal matches, featuring the semifinal losers each facing the remaining repechage opponent from their half of the bracket.

== Results ==
Legend

- WO — Won by walkover

=== Final ===
Semifinals		Final
Róbert Fritsch (HUN)	1
Nao Kusaka (JPN)	3	Nao Kusaka (JPN)	1
Malkhas Amoyan (ARM)	5	Malkhas Amoyan (ARM)	10
Alireza Abdevali (IRI)	1

=== Top half ===
==== Section 1 ====
Round of 64
Ramaz Zoidze (GEO)
Kang Hyeon-jin (KOR)	WO

Round of 32
Aram Vardanyan (UZB)	2
Róbert Fritsch (HUN)	5
Yao Lai-hsing (TPE)	0
Alexandrin Guțu (MDA)	12
Kang Hyeon-jin (KOR)	0
Antonio Kamenjašević (CRO)	9
Samuel Bellscheidt (GER)	2
Sergey Kutuzov (UWW)	5

Round of 16
Róbert Fritsch (HUN)	3
Alexandrin Guțu (MDA)	2
Antonio Kamenjašević (CRO)	1
Sergey Kutuzov (UWW)	1

Quarterfinals
Róbert Fritsch (HUN)	2
Antonio Kamenjašević (CRO)	1

==== Section 2 ====
Round of 64

Round of 32
Demeu Zhadrayev (KAZ)	5
Jonni Sarkkinen (FIN)	2
Aleksa Ilić (SRB)	3
Chawki Doulache (ALG)	1
Calebe Ferreira (BRA)	4
Ihor Bychkov (UKR)	8
Aman Baroniya (IND)	0
Nao Kusaka (JPN)	8

Round of 16
Demeu Zhadrayev (KAZ)	8
Aleksa Ilić (SRB)	6
Ihor Bychkov (UKR)	0
Nao Kusaka (JPN)	7

Quarterfinals
Demeu Zhadrayev (KAZ)	2
Nao Kusaka (JPN)	4

=== Bottom half ===
==== Section 3 ====
Round of 64

Round of 32
Malkhas Amoyan (ARM)	2
Kamal Bey (USA)	1
Arman Karapetyan (UWW)	1
Mateusz Bernatek (POL)	6
Stoyan Kubatov (BUL)	4
Tigran Galustyan (FRA)	1
Saoud Al-Mefqaey (QAT)	0
Ahmet Yılmaz (TUR)	10

Round of 16
Malkhas Amoyan (ARM)	10
Mateusz Bernatek (POL)	0
Stoyan Kubatov (BUL)	3
Ahmet Yılmaz (TUR)	5

Quarterfinals
Malkhas Amoyan (ARM)	3
Ahmet Yılmaz (TUR)	1

==== Section 4 ====
Round of 64

Round of 32
Yryskeldi Maksatbek Uulu (KGZ)	10
Emmanuel Benítez (MEX)	2
Alireza Abdevali (IRI)	5
Marcos Sánchez-Silva (ESP)	0
Vilius Savickas (LTU)	0
Pan Chunyang (CHN)	8
Albin Olofsson (SWE)	0
Sanan Suleymanov (AZE)	5

Round of 16
Yryskeldi Maksatbek Uulu (KGZ)	0
Alireza Abdevali (IRI)	6
Pan Chunyang (CHN)	0
Sanan Suleymanov (AZE)	8

Quarterfinals
Alireza Abdevali (IRI)	3
Sanan Suleymanov (AZE)	1

=== Repechage ===
Repechage round 2
Aman Baroniya (IND)	0
Ihor Bychkov (UKR)	10
Kamal Bey (USA)	11
Mateusz Bernatek (POL)	2

Repechage round 3
Ihor Bychkov (UKR)	1
Demeu Zhadrayev (KAZ)	3
Kamal Bey (USA)	2
Ahmet Yılmaz (TUR)	4

Bronze medals
Demeu Zhadrayev (KAZ)	5
Róbert Fritsch (HUN)	6
Ahmet Yılmaz (TUR)	6
Alireza Abdevali (IRI)	3

== Final standing ==
Rank	Athlete
1st place, gold medalist(s)	Malkhas Amoyan (ARM)
2nd place, silver medalist(s)	Nao Kusaka (JPN)
3rd place, bronze medalist(s)	Róbert Fritsch (HUN)
3rd place, bronze medalist(s)	Ahmet Yılmaz (TUR)
5	Demeu Zhadrayev (KAZ)
5	Alireza Abdevali (IRI)
7	Ihor Bychkov (UKR)
8	Sanan Suleymanov (AZE)
9	Antonio Kamenjašević (CRO)
10	Kamal Bey (USA)
11	Alexandrin Guțu (MDA)
12	Kang Hyeon-jin (KOR)
13	Yryskeldi Maksatbek Uulu (KGZ)
14	Pan Chunyang (CHN)
15	Aleksa Ilić (SRB)
16	Mateusz Bernatek (POL)
17	Stoyan Kubatov (BUL)
18	Sergey Kutuzov (UWW)
19	Calebe Ferreira (BRA)
20	Aram Vardanyan (UZB)
21	Samuel Bellscheidt (GER)
22	Jonni Sarkkinen (FIN)
23	Emmanuel Benítez (MEX)
24	Chawki Doulache (ALG)
25	Tigran Galustyan (FRA)
26	Arman Karapetyan (UWW)
27	Ramaz Zoidze (GEO)
28	Marcos Sánchez-Silva (ESP)
29	Albin Olofsson (SWE)
30	Vilius Savickas (LTU)
31	Saoud Al-Mefqaey (QAT)
32	Yao Lai-hsing (TPE)
33	Aman Baroniya (IND)
