= 2024 European Wrestling Championships – Men's Greco-Roman 77 kg =

Wrestling competition

Men's Greco-Roman 77 kg at the 2024 European Wrestling Championships
- Venue: Polyvalent Hall
- Location: Bucharest, Romania
- Dates: 12-13 February
- Competitors: 25

Medalists
gold medal	Malkhas Amoyan	Armenia
silver medal	Yunus Emre Başar	Turkey
bronze medal	Iuri Lomadze	Georgia
bronze medal	Adlet Tiuliubaev	Individual Neutral Athletes

The Men's Greco-Roman 77 kg is a competition featured at the 2024 European Wrestling Championships, and was held in Bucharest, Romania on February 12 and 13.

== Results ==
Legend

- F — Won by fall

=== Final ===
Final
Yunus Emre Başar (TUR)	0
Malkhas Amoyan (ARM)	7

=== Top half ===
Round of 32
Shuai Mamedau (AIN)	0
Idris Ibaev (GER)	6
Marcos Sánchez-Silva (ESP)	5
Denis Horváth (SVK)	4
Antonio Kamenjašević (CRO)	5
Patryk Bednarz (POL)	1
Stoyan Kubatov (BUL)	3
Oldřich Varga (CZE)	1
Yunus Emre Başar (TUR)	3
Ibrahim Ghanem (FRA)	1

Round of 16
Sanan Suleymanov (AZE)	10
Idris Ibaev (GER)	0
Marcos Sánchez-Silva (ESP)	0
Antonio Kamenjašević (CRO)	8
Paulius Galkinas (LTU)	0
Stoyan Kubatov (BUL)	9
Yunus Emre Başar (TUR)	5
Iuri Lomadze (GEO)	1

Quarterfinals
Sanan Suleymanov (AZE)	1
Antonio Kamenjašević (CRO)	3
Stoyan Kubatov (BUL)	0
Yunus Emre Başar (TUR)	4

Semifinals
Antonio Kamenjašević (CRO)	1
Yunus Emre Başar (TUR)	3

=== Bottom half ===
Round of 32
Ali Arsalan (SRB)	0
Sebastian Aak (NOR)	8
Róbert Fritsch (HUN)	2
Ilie Cojocari (ROU)	0
Albin Olofsson (SWE)	7
Fabio Dietsche (SUI)	1
Riccardo Abbrescia (ITA)	12
Igor Bychkov (UKR)	2

Round of 16
Alexandrin Guțu (MDA)	9
Juan Sebastian Aak (NOR)	1
Róbert Fritsch (HUN)	7
Akseli Yli-Hannuksela (FIN)	5
Adlet Tiuliubaev (AIN)	6
Albin Olofsson (SWE)	1
Riccardo Abbrescia (ITA)	1
Malkhas Amoyan (ARM)	10^{F}

Quarterfinals
Alexandrin Guțu (MDA)	5
Róbert Fritsch (HUN)	3
Adlet Tiuliubaev (AIN)	2
Malkhas Amoyan (ARM)	3

Semifinals
Alexandrin Guțu (MDA)	1
Malkhas Amoyan (ARM)	2

=== Repechage ===
Repechage round 1
Ibrahim Ghanem (FRA)
Iuri Lomadze (GEO)	WO

Repechage round 2
Iuri Lomadze (GEO)	7
Stoyan Kubatov (BUL)	5
Riccardo Abbrescia (ITA)	1
Adlet Tiuliubaev (AIN)	5

Bronze medal match
Iuri Lomadze (GEO)	8
Antonio Kamenjašević (CRO)	0
Adlet Tiuliubaev (AIN)	13
Alexandrin Guțu (MDA)	4

== Final standing ==
Rank	Athlete
1st place, gold medalist(s)	Malkhas Amoyan (ARM)
2nd place, silver medalist(s)	Yunus Emre Başar (TUR)
3rd place, bronze medalist(s)	Iuri Lomadze (GEO)
3rd place, bronze medalist(s)	Adlet Tiuliubaev (AIN)
5	Alexandrin Guțu (MDA)
5	Antonio Kamenjašević (CRO)
7	Stoyan Kubatov (BUL)
8	Róbert Fritsch (HUN)
9	Riccardo Abbrescia (ITA)
10	Sanan Suleymanov (AZE)
11	Juan Sebastian Aak (NOR)
12	Albin Olofsson (SWE)
13	Idris Ibaev (GER)
14	Marcos Sánchez-Silva (ESP)
15	Akseli Yli-Hannuksela (FIN)
16	Denis Horváth (SVK)
17	Igor Bychkov (UKR)
18	Oldřich Varga (CZE)
19	Ibrahim Ghanem (FRA)
20	Patryk Bednarz (POL)
21	Fabio Dietsche (SUI)
22	Ilie Cojocari (ROU)
23	Shuai Mamedau (AIN)
24	Ali Arsalan (SRB)
25	Paulius Galkinas (LTU)
