= 2025 European Wrestling Championships – Men's Greco-Roman 77 kg =

Wrestling competition

Men's Greco-Roman 77 kg at the 2025 European Wrestling Championships
- Venue: X-Bionic Sphere
- Location: Bratislava, Slovakia
- Dates: 11-12 April
- Competitors: 22

Medalists
gold medal	Malkhas Amoyan	Armenia
silver medal	Ramaz Zoidze	Georgia
bronze medal	Ahmet Yılmaz	Turkey
bronze medal	Alexandru Solovei	Moldova

The men's Greco-Roman 77 kg is a competition featured at the 2025 European Wrestling Championships, and was held in Bratislava, Slovakia on April 11 and 12.

== Results ==
Legend

- F — Won by fall

=== Final ===
Final
Ramaz Zoidze (GEO)	1
Malkhas Amoyan (ARM)	3

=== Top half ===
Round of 32
Marcos Sánchez-Silva (ESP)	1
Ramaz Zoidze (GEO)	7
Albin Olofsson (SWE)	8
Georgios Sotiriadis (GRE)	0
Jonni Sarkkinen (FIN)	7
Irfan Mirzoiev (UKR)	1

Round of 16
Sanan Suleymanov (AZE)	1
Ahmet Yılmaz (TUR)	2
Ramaz Zoidze (GEO)	2^{F}
Michal Zelenka (CZE)	0
Oliver Oláh (SVK)	1
Albin Olofsson (SWE)	5^{F}
Jonni Sarkkinen (FIN)	1
Antonio Kamenjašević (CRO)	5

Quarterfinals
Ahmet Yılmaz (TUR)	1
Ramaz Zoidze (GEO)	10
Albin Olofsson (SWE)	5
Antonio Kamenjašević (CRO)	0

Semifinals
Ramaz Zoidze (GEO)	10
Albin Olofsson (SWE)	2

=== Bottom half ===
Round of 32
Sergey Stepanov (UWW)	9
Kevin Kupi (ALB)	0
Maksim Shedz (UWW)	1
Aik Mnatsakanian (BUL)	3
Aleksa Ilić (SRB)	2
Paulius Galkinas (LTU)	1

Round of 16
Zoltán Lévai (HUN)	5
Sergey Stepanov (UWW)	0
Aik Mnatsakanian (BUL)	5
Idris Ibaev (GER)	1
Alexandru Solovei (MDA)	3
Aleksa Ilić (SRB)	0
Mateusz Bernatek (POL)	0
Malkhas Amoyan (ARM)	9

Quarterfinals
Zoltán Lévai (HUN)	1
Aik Mnatsakanian (BUL)	6
Alexandru Solovei (MDA)	2
Malkhas Amoyan (ARM)	7

Semifinals
Aik Mnatsakanian (BUL)	1
Malkhas Amoyan (ARM)	5

=== Repechage ===
Repechage round 1
Marcos Sánchez-Silva (ESP)	3
Michal Zelenka (CZE)	7

Repechage round 2
Michal Zelenka (CZE)	0
Ahmet Yılmaz (TUR)	7
Mateusz Bernatek (POL)	8
Alexandru Solovei (MDA)	10

Bronze medal match
Ahmet Yılmaz (TUR)	7^{F}
Albin Olofsson (SWE)	0
Alexandru Solovei (MDA)	3
Aik Mnatsakanian (BUL)	1

== Final standing ==
Rank	Athlete
1st place, gold medalist(s)	Malkhas Amoyan (ARM)
2nd place, silver medalist(s)	Ramaz Zoidze (GEO)
3rd place, bronze medalist(s)	Ahmet Yılmaz (TUR)
3rd place, bronze medalist(s)	Alexandru Solovei (MDA)
5	Albin Olofsson (SWE)
5	Aik Mnatsakanian (BUL)
7	Sergey Stepanov (UWW)
8	Jonni Sarkkinen (FIN)
9	Zoltán Lévai (HUN)
10	Michal Zelenka (CZE)
11	Antonio Kamenjašević (CRO)
12	Aleksa Ilić (SRB)
13	Marcos Sánchez-Silva (ESP)
14	Mateusz Bernatek (POL)
15	Sanan Suleymanov (AZE)
16	Paulius Galkinas (LTU)
17	Maksim Shedz (UWW)
18	Idris Ibaev (GER)
19	Irfan Mirzoiev (UKR)
20	Oliver Oláh (SVK)
21	Georgios Sotiriadis (GRE)
22	Kevin Kupi (ALB)
