= Grappling Federation of Armenia =

Sports organization of Armenia

Grappling Federation of Armenia logo

The Grappling Federation of Armenia (Armenian: Հայաստանի Գրափլինգի Ֆեդերացիա) is the regulating body of grappling in Armenia, governed by the Armenian Olympic Committee. The headquarters of the federation is located in Yerevan.

== History ==
The Grappling Federation of Armenia is currently led by president Sargis Bazinyan. The Federation oversees the training of grappling specialists (known as grapplers) and organizes Armenia's participation in European and international level grappling competitions, including in the World Grappling Championships and World Junior Grappling Championships. In 2015, the Federation hosted the ADCC Submission Fighting World Championships in Yerevan.

The Federation also manages several grappling clubs throughout Armenia and hosts national tournaments. The Federation cooperates closely with the Wrestling Federation of Armenia, which itself is a member of United World Wrestling.

== See also ==
- Sport in Armenia
- Wrestling in Armenia
