= 2023 World Cadet Wrestling Championships – Men's Greco-Roman =

The men's Greco-Roman competitions at the 2023 World Cadet Wrestling Championships were held in Istanbul, Turkey between 31 July to 2 August 2023.

== Men's Greco-Roman ==
=== Men's Greco-Roman 45 kg ===
1 August

Legend

- F — Won by fall

Round of 16
Turan Dashdamirov (AZE)	10
Kaisei Yamamoto (JPN)	0
Kadyrbek Almanbetov (KGZ)	6
Mehmet Sarp (TUR)	1
Henry Aslikyan (USA)	0
Alireza Ghasroddashti (IRI)	11
Khojiakbar Kuchkarov (UZB)	12
Igor Cazac (MDA)	14
Pranjl Kangra (IND)	0
Zharas Sovetov (KAZ)	8
Zoltán Both (SVK)	0
Yurik Mkhitaryan (ARM)	8
Nika Tsetskhladze (GEO)	5
Kaloyan Ivanov (BUL)	0
Rustem Abatsiev (ANA)	10
Athanasios Tsinias (GRE)	0

Quarterfinals
Turan Dashdamirov (AZE)	9
Kadyrbek Almanbetov (KGZ)	1
Alireza Ghasroddashti (IRI)	8
Igor Cazac (MDA)	1
Zharas Sovetov (KAZ)	0
Yurik Mkhitaryan (ARM)	8
Nika Tsetskhladze (GEO)	0
Rustem Abatsiev (ANA)	4

Semifinals
Turan Dashdamirov (AZE)	5
Alireza Ghasroddashti (IRI)	1
Yurik Mkhitaryan (ARM)	2
Rustem Abatsiev (ANA)	10

Final
Turan Dashdamirov (AZE)	4
Rustem Abatsiev (ANA)	4

Repechage round 1
Kaisei Yamamoto (JPN)	7
Kadyrbek Almanbetov (KGZ)	13^{F}
Athanasios Tsinias (GRE)	1
Nika Tsetskhladze (GEO)	12

Bronze medal match
Kadyrbek Almanbetov (KGZ)	1
Alireza Ghasroddashti (IRN)	5
Nika Tsetskhladze (GEO)	0
Yurik Mkhitaryan (ARM)	9

=== Men's Greco-Roman 48 kg ===
31 July

Legend

- F — Won by fall

Round of 32
	Score	
Maksim Bradziak (ANA)	0-8	Payam Balootaki (IRI)
Karim Elemary (EGY)	WO	Ivan Seibel (GER)
Ezekiel Witt (USA)	0-8	Edgar Petrosyan (ARM)

Round of 16
Elnar Ziyadov (AZE)	8
Iuri Chapidze (GEO)	0
Payam Balootaki (IRI)	10
Haruki Shiina (JPN)	3
Beknur Mukan (KAZ)	8
Pedro Henrique Rodrigues (BRA)	3
Murat Khatit (ANA)	5
Petro Zhytovoz (HUN)	0
Ionut Mereuta (ROU)	0
Shakhzod Ruziokhunov (UZB)	9
Ivan Seibel (GER)	10
Elmar Ishenbekov (KGZ)	3
Abdulsamet Uçar (TUR)	0
Edgar Petrosyan (ARM)	7
Maksat Seytiyev (TKM)
Siddhanath Patil (IND)	WO

Quarterfinals
Elnar Ziyadov (AZE)	2
Payam Balootaki (IRI)	4
Beknur Mukan (KAZ)	0
Murat Khatit (ANA)	8
Shakhzod Ruziokhunov (UZB)	8
Ivan Seibel (GER)	0
Edgar Petrosyan (ARM)	8
Siddhanath Patil (IND)	0

Semifinals
Payam Balootaki (IRI)	3
Murat Khatit (ANA)	2
Shakhzod Ruziokhunov (UZB)	4
Edgar Petrosyan (ARM)	1

Final
Payam Balootaki (IRI)	4
Shakhzod Ruziokhunov (UZB)	0

Repechage round 1
Maksim Bradziak (ANA)	11
Haruki Shiina (JPN)	5

Repechage round 2
Maksim Bradziak (ANA)	0
Elnar Ziyadov (AZE)	10
Ionut Mereuta (ROU)	3
Ivan Seibel (GER)	8^{F}

Bronze medal match
Elnar Ziyadov (AZE)	5
Murat Khatit (ANA)	4
Ivan Seibel (GER)	0
Edgar Petrosyan (ARM)	8^{F}

=== Men's Greco-Roman 51 kg ===
1 August

Legend

- F — Won by fall

Round of 32
	Score	
Cholponbek Torobekov (KGZ)	4-13	Manu Yadav (IND)
Koba Karumidze (GEO)	9-0	Nolan Pissocher (FRA)

Round of 16
Rasim Ibrahimau (ANA)	5
Omar Mohamed Ibrahim (EGY)	1
Manu Yadav (IND)	6
Moises González (ECU)	2
Mohammad Meraj Mohmadi (IRI)	0
Artur Broyan (ARM)	4^{F}
Hudson Loges (USA)	1
Husniddin Ulugbekov (TKM)	4
Dostonbek Oripov (UZB)	7
Dragos Draga🇺🇿 (ROU)	1
Zhanbolat Saparbek (KAZ)	14
Futo Fukasawa (JPN)	4
Ömer Altaş (TUR)	0
Koba Karumidze (GEO)	11
Ali Seyidalili (AZE)	3
Ilia Kandalin (ANA)	8

Quarterfinals
Rasim Ibrahimau (ANA)	0
Manu Yadav (IND)	3
Artur Broyan (ARM)	8
Husniddin Ulugbekov (TKM)	0
Dostonbek Oripov (UZB)	9
Zhanbolat Saparbek (KAZ)	0
Koba Karumidze (GEO)	1
Ilia Kandalin (ANA)	5

Semifinals
Manu Yadav (IND)	0
Artur Broyan (ARM)	2^{F}
Dostonbek Oripov (UZB)	7
Ilia Kandalin (ANA)	11

Final
Artur Broyan (ARM)	0
Ilia Kandalin (ANA)	9

Repechage round 1
Mohammad Meraj Mohmadi (IRN)	0
Husniddin Ulugbekov (TKM)	4^{F}
Ali Seyidalili (AZE)	5
Koba Karumidze (GEO)	9

Bronze medal match
Husniddin Ulugbekov (TKM)	0
Manu Yadav (IND)	9
Koba Karumidze (GEO)	3
Dostonbek Oripov (UZB)	1

=== Men's Greco-Roman 55 kg ===
31 July

Legend

- F — Won by fall

Final

Final
Jordyn Raney (USA)	12
Suraj (IND)	2

Top half

Round of 32
Ahmed Abdelbary Shaban (EGY)	0
Jordyn Raney (USA)	8
Levente Fige (HUN)	0
Alpamys Bolatuly (KAZ)	4
Aytjan Khalmakhanov (UZB)	9
Daniel Struzinski (AUT)	0
Yuri Karapetyan (ARM)	5
Aykhan Javadov (AZE)	2
Bayramgeldi Yagmyrov (TKM)
Shu Takahashi (JPN)	WO

Round of 16
Shu-Wei Chung (TPE)	0
Jordyn Raney (USA)	8
Alpamys Bolatuly (KAZ)	3
Aytjan Khalmakhanov (UZB)	11
Mario Mariut (NOR)	6
Yuri Karapetyan (ARM)	10
Shu Takahashi (JPN)	1
Mohammadreza Gholami (IRI)	6

Quarterfinals
Jordyn Raney (USA)	8
Aytjan Khalmakhanov (UZB)	6
Yuri Karapetyan (ARM)	1
Mohammadreza Gholami (IRI)	1

Semifinals
Jordyn Raney (USA)	8
Mohammadreza Gholami (IRI)	7

Bottom half

Round of 32
Maxim Sarmanov (MDA)	2
Alyosha Iliev (BUL)	1
Halil Çınar (TUR)	9
Danila Charapenka (ANA)	0
Airat Salikhov (ANA)	8
Richard Pajuviidik (EST)	0
Vakhtang Lolua (GEO)	4
Kuttubek Rysmatov (KGZ)	9
Mustafa Ahmed Al Saeedi (IRQ)	3
Nodirjon Sangov (TJK)	3
David Shevchenko (ISR)	10
Dawid Sztajkowski (POL)	9

Round of 16
Atte Suhonen (FIN)	0
Maxim Sarmanov (MDA)	9
Halil Çınar (TUR)	5
Airat Salikhov (ANA)	3
Kuttubek Rysmatov (KGZ)	9
Mustafa Ahmed Al Saeedi (IRQ)	1
David Shevchenko (ISR)	0
Suraj (IND)	8

Quarterfinals
Maxim Sarmanov (MDA)	3
Halil Çınar (TUR)	5
Kuttubek Rysmatov (KGZ)	6
Suraj (IND)	9

Semifinals
Halil Çınar (TUR)	0
Suraj (IND)	6

Repechage round 1
Ahmed Abdelbary Shaban (EGY)	8
Shu-Wei Chung (TPE)	0

Repechage round 2
Ahmed Abdelbary Shaban (EGY)	4
Aytjan Khalmakhanov (UZB)	9
David Shevchenko (ISR)	0
Kuttubek Rysmatov (KGZ)	4^{F}

Bronze medal match
Aytjan Khalmakhanov (UZB)	11
Mohammadreza Gholami (IRN)	2
Kuttubek Rysmatov (KGZ)	11
Halil Çınar (TUR)	1

=== Men's Greco-Roman 60 kg ===
1 August

Legend

- F — Won by fall

Round of 32
	Score	
Daichi Sakashita (JPN)	2-3	Varun (IND)
Ogabek Muqimov (UZB)	5-1	Kristiyan Milenkov (BUL)
Eimantas Andriuska (LTU)	0-9	Mingiian Goriaev (ANA)
Alin Muraru (MDA)	9-0	Nikita Muradov (EST)
Kemal Şahbaz (TUR)	0-10	Ali Amir Nezhad (IRI)
Bekzhan Esenbek (KGZ)	9-0	Aviv Voloch (ISR)
Samuel Herring (USA)	3-6	Yerdaulet Lassim (KAZ)

Round of 16
Clisman Veliz (ECU)	9
Kemal Kakabayev (TKM)	0
Varun (IND)	2
Roman Karimov (AZE)	5
Samvel Terteryan (ARM)	4
Ogabek Muqimov (UZB)	1
Mingiian Goriaev (ANA)	8
Sokratis Konstantinidis (GRE)	0
Kiryl Valeuski (ANA)	8
Alin Muraru (MDA)	0
Ali Amir Nezhad (IRI)	3
Krzysztof Jakubowski (POL)	2
Saba Surmanidze (GEO)	3
Bekzhan Esenbek (KGZ)	1
Yerdaulet Lassim (KAZ)	9
Mohamed Ayman Ibrahim (EGY)	0

Quarterfinals
Clisman Veliz (ECU)	1
Roman Karimov (AZE)	8
Samvel Terteryan (ARM)	1
Mingiian Goriaev (ANA)	7
Kiryl Valeuski (ANA)	8
Ali Amir Nezhad (IRI)	4
Saba Surmanidze (GEO)	11
Yerdaulet Lassim (KAZ)	9

Semifinals
Roman Karimov (AZE)	9
Mingiian Goriaev (ANA)	5
Kiryl Valeuski (ANA)	5
Saba Surmanidze (GEO)	7

Final
Roman Karimov (AZE)	4
Saba Surmanidze (GEO)	3

Repechage round 1
Varun (IND)	7
Clisman Veliz (ECU)	1
Bekzhan Esenbek (KGZ)	0
Yerdaulet Lassim (KAZ)	9

Bronze medal match
Varun (IND)	6
Mingiian Goriaev (ANA)	15
Yerdaulet Lassim (KAZ)	8
Kiryl Valeuski (ANA)	12

=== Men's Greco-Roman 65 kg ===
31 July

Legend

- F — Won by fall

Final

Final
Yusif Ahmadli (AZE)	1
Zaur Beslekoev (ANA)	5

Top half

Round of 32
William Greenwood (USA)	0
Yusif Ahmadli (AZE)	8
Amir Radzibob (ISR)	5
Daniel Jeremejev (EST)	1
Ali Faris Al Taiee (IRQ)	1
Octavian Cernetchi (MDA)	4^{F}
Mohamed Hassan Abdelrehim (EGY)	9
Hubert Wysoczański (POL)	0
Zalán Pék (SRB)	6
Amir Mahdi Nava (IRI)	1
Attila Józsa (HUN)	10
Nelson Giovani González (MEX)	0

Round of 16
Athanasios Efthymiadis (GRE)	0
Yusif Ahmadli (AZE)	8
Amir Radzibob (ISR)	2
Octavian Cernetchi (MDA)	11
Mohamed Hassan Abdelrehim (EGY)	6
Zalán Pék (SRB)	0
Attila Józsa (HUN)	2
Islombek Karimjonov (UZB)	4

Quarterfinals
Yusif Ahmadli (AZE)	15
Octavian Cernetchi (MDA)	6
Mohamed Hassan Abdelrehim (EGY)	2
Islombek Karimjonov (UZB)	3

Semifinals
Yusif Ahmadli (AZE)	12
Islombek Karimjonov (UZB)	4

Bottom half

Round of 32
Taeyong Kwon (KOR)	0
Constantin Lungu (ROU)	9
Giorgi Tchikaidze (GEO)	5
Ihar Anoshka (ANA)	1
Petros Ashkaryan (ARM)	9
İbrahim Hayri Aydemir (TUR)	1
Antonio Hristov (BUL)	4
Zaur Beslekoev (ANA)	7
Erjan Akylbek Uulu (KGZ)	1
Alibek Turlygazy (KAZ)	4
Kumar Sachin (IND)	7
Shatlyk Yunusov (TKM)	6

Round of 16
Jure Rajković (CRO)	0
Constantin Lungu (ROU)	8
Giorgi Tchikaidze (GEO)	7
Petros Ashkaryan (ARM)	6
Zaur Beslekoev (ANA)	7
Alibek Turlygazy (KAZ)	4
Kumar Sachin (IND)	9
Tsubasa Eguchi (JPN)	0

Quarterfinals
Constantin Lungu (ROU)	2
Giorgi Tchikaidze (GEO)	5
Zaur Beslekoev (ANA)	7
Kumar Sachin (IND)	0

Semifinals
Giorgi Tchikaidze (GEO)	1
Zaur Beslekoev (ANA)	5

Repechage round 1
William Greenwood (USA)	6
Athanasios Efthymiadis (GRE)	9
Antonio Hristov (BUL)	0
Alibek Turlygazy (KAZ)	10

Repechage round 2
Athanasios Efthymiadis (GRE)	2
Octavian Cernetchi (MDA)	2^{F}
Alibek Turlygazy (KAZ)	0
Kumar Sachin (IND)	6

Bronze medal match
Octavian Cernetchi (MDA)	0
Islombek Karimjonov (UZB)	8
Kumar Sachin (IND)	6
Giorgi Tchikaidze (GEO)	2

=== Men's Greco-Roman 71 kg ===
1 August

Legend

- F — Won by fall

Final

Final
Arionas Kolitsopoulos (GRE)	6
Ahmadreza Mohamadian (IRI)	5

Top half

Round of 32
Javad Mammadov (AZE)	7
Severi Mäenpää (FIN)	10
Sohamraj More (IND)	0
Seongmin Jang (KOR)	8
Arionas Kolitsopoulos (GRE)	2
Cristian Risca (MDA)	1
Minijus Leonavičius (LTU)	4
Lars Matt (AUT)	9^{F}
Arvin Khosravy (USA)	1
Ivan Bialiayeu (ANA)	4
Sergey Stoev (BUL)	0
Abdurakhman Abdulkadyrov (ANA)	9
Timur Nadorgin (ISR)	9
Dominik Hervai (SVK)	4

Round of 16
Dias Seitkaliyev (KAZ)	8
Severi Mäenpää (FIN)	0
Seongmin Jang (KOR)	6
Arionas Kolitsopoulos (GRE)	7^{F}
Lars Matt (AUT)	3
Ivan Bialiayeu (ANA)	7
Abdurakhman Abdulkadyrov (ANA)	9
Timur Nadorgin (ISR)	0

Quarterfinals
Dias Seitkaliyev (KAZ)	3
Arionas Kolitsopoulos (GRE)	7
Ivan Bialiayeu (ANA)	0
Abdurakhman Abdulkadyrov (ANA)	10

Semifinals
Arionas Kolitsopoulos (GRE)	2
Abdurakhman Abdulkadyrov (ANA)	1

Bottom half

Round of 32
Temirbek Abdullaev (UZB)	3
Isodzhon Nurakhmedov (TJK)	9
Shuya Miura (JPN)	9
Ognjen Todosijević (SRB)	0
Nikita Mezov (EST)	6^{F}
Dominik Czuczor (HUN)	2
Marko Klarić (CRO)	4
Alkan Akar (TUR)	14
Ahmadreza Mohamadian (IRI)	9
Anthony Tretter (POL)	0
Youssef Ahmed Badawy (EGY)	1
Gor Khachatryan (ARM)	6
Luka Lomadze (GEO)	9
Elkhan Choenbekov (KGZ)	0

Round of 16
Isodzhon Nurakhmedov (TJK)	8^{F}
Shuya Miura (JPN)	4
Nikita Mezov (EST)	1
Alkan Akar (TUR)	11
Ahmadreza Mohamadian (IRI)	5
Gor Khachatryan (ARM)	2
Luka Lomadze (GEO)	5
Idrees Jaf (IRQ)	5

Quarterfinals
Isodzhon Nurakhmedov (TJK)	5
Alkan Akar (TUR)	15
Ahmadreza Mohamadian (IRI)	4
Luka Lomadze (GEO)	3

Semifinals
Alkan Akar (TUR)	0
Ahmadreza Mohamadian (IRI)	4

Repechage round 1
Cristian Risca (MDA)	0
Seongmin Jang (KOR)	8^{F}
Anthony Tretter (POL)	1
Gor Khachatryan (ARM)	3

Repechage round 2
Seongmin Jang (KOR)	0
Dias Seitkaliyev (KAZ)	8
Gor Khachatryan (ARM)	4
Luka Lomadze (GEO)	5

Bronze medal match
Dias Seitkaliyev (KAZ)	0
Abdurakhman Abdulkadyrov (ANA)	10
Luka Lomadze (GEO)	1
Alkan Akar (TUR)	5

=== Men's Greco-Roman 80 kg ===
31 July

Legend

- F — Won by fall

Final

Final
Mikhail Shkarin (ANA)	6
Taizo Yoshida (JPN)	8

Top half

Round of 32
Marin Zovko (CRO)	1
Eleftherios Pappas (GRE)	5
Aman (IND)	5
Saba Gaprindashvili (GEO)	5
Miguel Angel Salazar (COL)	1
Adam Scott Waters (USA)	6
Erik Ter-Matevosyan (ARM)	5
Seef Sameh Abdalaziz (EGY)	0
Bekmurod Rustamov (UZB)	4
Bakyt Dzhakupbekov (KGZ)	1

Round of 16
Szabolcs Szinay (HUN)	1
Eleftherios Pappas (GRE)	2^{F}
Aman (IND)	0
Adam Scott Waters (USA)	9
Mikhail Shkarin (ANA)	8
Erik Ter-Matevosyan (ARM)	4
Bekmurod Rustamov (UZB)	1
Elmin Aliyev (AZE)	3

Quarterfinals
Eleftherios Pappas (GRE)	8
Adam Scott Waters (USA)	1
Mikhail Shkarin (ANA)	4
Elmin Aliyev (AZE)	3

Semifinals
Eleftherios Pappas (GRE)	0
Mikhail Shkarin (ANA)	9

Bottom half

Round of 32
Paul Maier (AUT)	2
Alexandr Plescan (MDA)	7
Dušan Stokić (SRB)	2
Stanisław Fussy (POL)	10
Itzhak Nemsadze (ISR)	3
Marcus Uhtjaerv (EST)	1
Taizo Yoshida (JPN)	12
Emir Tuğra Dayal (TUR)	2
Alireza Abghar Abbasi (IRI)	9
Mohamed El-Naggar (PLE)	0

Round of 16
Uladzislau Dubrouski (ANA)	9
Alexandr Plescan (MDA)	0
Stanisław Fussy (POL)	10
Haik Sargsyan (FRA)	1
Itzhak Nemsadze (ISR)	0
Taizo Yoshida (JPN)	10
Alireza Abghar Abbasi (IRI)	6
Shymyrbek Beibarys (KAZ)	3

Quarterfinals
Uladzislau Dubrouski (ANA)	9
Stanisław Fussy (POL)	0
Taizo Yoshida (JPN)	11
Alireza Abghar Abbasi (IRI)	2

Semifinals
Uladzislau Dubrouski (ANA)	2
Taizo Yoshida (JPN)	10

Repechage round 1
Itzhak Nemsadze (ISR)	2
Emir Tuğra Dayal (TUR)	3

Repechage round 2
Erik Ter-Matevosyan (ARM)	8
Elmin Aliyev (AZE)	4
Alireza Abghar Abbasi (IRI)	3
Emir Tuğra Dayal (TUR)	0

Bronze medal match
Eleftherios Pappas (GRE)	2
Erik Ter-Matevosyan (ARM)	8
Uladzislau Dubrouski (ANA)	2
Alireza Abghar Abbasi (IRI)	1

=== Men's Greco-Roman 92 kg ===
1 August

Legend

- F — Won by fall

Round of 32
	Score	
Ole Ayke Sterning (GER)	F 5-3	Pavel Savitsky (ANA)
Radostin Vasilev (BUL)	8-9	Dorian Olguin (MEX)
Maxim Ukraintsev (KAZ)	7-1	Ramandeep (IND)
Grisha Voskanyan (ARM)	1-2	Alihan Bereket (TUR)
Rondo Kodama (JPN)	0-8	Nurbolot Syrgabai Uulu (KGZ)
Pieter Lafras Uys (NAM)	F 8-0	Sardorbek Rustamov (UZB)
Andrej Rodin (CRO)	1-1	Aliakbar Valadi (IRI)

Round of 16
Stevan Kojić (SRB)	0
Aiden Cash Cooley (USA)	9
Ole Ayke Sterning (GER)	0
Gabriel Eduardo Stan (ROU)	4^{F}
Saipula Gadzhimagomedov (ANA)	9
Dorian Olguin (MEX)	0
Maxim Ukraintsev (KAZ)	9
Vendel Vitai (HUN)	0
Mikayil Ismayilov (AZE)	5
Alihan Bereket (TUR)	1
Nurbolot Syrgabai Uulu (KGZ)	13^{F}
Abdelfattah Abdelzaher (EGY)	5
Dimitrios Pappas (GRE)	5
Sardorbek Rustamov (UZB)	10
Aliakbar Valadi (IRI)	0
Saba Purtseladze (GEO)	2

Quarterfinals
Aiden Cash Cooley (USA)	0
Gabriel Eduardo Stan (ROU)	11
Saipula Gadzhimagomedov (ANA)	8
Maxim Ukraintsev (KAZ)	6
Mikayil Ismayilov (AZE)	1
Nurbolot Syrgabai Uulu (KGZ)	1
Sardorbek Rustamov (UZB)	1
Saba Purtseladze (GEO)	5

Semifinals
Gabriel Eduardo Stan (ROU)	0
Saipula Gadzhimagomedov (ANA)	9
Mikayil Ismayilov (AZE)	1
Saba Purtseladze (GEO)	3

Final
Saipula Gadzhimagomedov (ANA)	7
Saba Purtseladze (GEO)	7

Repechage round 1
Dorian Olguin (MEX)	0
Maxim Ukraintsev (KAZ)	9
Aliakbar Valadi (IRI)	3
Sardorbek Rustamov (UZB)	1

Bronze medal match
Maxim Ukraintsev (KAZ)	0
Gabriel Eduardo Stan (ROU)	9
Aliakbar Valadi (IRI)	1
Mikayil Ismayilov (AZE)	3

=== Men's Greco-Roman 110 kg ===
31 July

Legend

- F — Won by fall

Round of 32
	Score	
Saba Chilashvili (GEO)	7-0	Renar Joonas (EST)
Pawel Janzen (POL)	0-8	Daniel Szilagyi (HUN)
Amirhossein Abdevali (IRI)	12-3	Danila Zubcov (MDA)
Bekzhan Ismagulov (KAZ)	6-0 Fall	Iliyan Dimitrov (BUL)

Round of 16
Eldar Emirov (ANA)	5^{F}
Talasbek Boobekov (KGZ)	6
Saba Chilashvili (GEO)	2
Mahir Gurbanli (AZE)	0
Nicholas Sahakian (USA)	3
Daniel Szilagyi (HUN)	1
Tomas Rusi (FIN)	0
Ronak (IND)	8
Andreas Kern (SVK)	2
Ryosei Takamatsu (JPN)	0
Amirhossein Abdevali (IRI)	8
Tsimafei Lazar (ANA)	0
Cemal Yusuf Bakır (TUR)	10
Bekzhan Ismagulov (KAZ)	0
Jaloliddin Sayfiddinov (UZB)	4
Mohamed Abdelnaby Ahmed (EGY)	7

Quarterfinals
Eldar Emirov (ANA)	4^{F}
Saba Chilashvili (GEO)	0
Nicholas Sahakian (USA)	0
Ronak (IND)	9
Andreas Kern (SVK)	0
Amirhossein Abdevali (IRI)	8
Cemal Yusuf Bakır (TUR)	4
Mohamed Abdelnaby Ahmed (EGY)	1

Semifinals
Eldar Emirov (ANA)	3
Ronak (IND)	6
Amirhossein Abdevali (IRI)	2
Cemal Yusuf Bakır (TUR)	4

Final
Ronak (IND)	0
Cemal Yusuf Bakır (TUR)	2

Repechage round 1
Tomas Rusi (FIN)	1
Nicholas Sahakian (USA)	5
Bekzhan Ismagulov (KAZ)	3
Mohamed Abdelnaby Ahmed (EGY)	11

Bronze medal match
Eldar Emirov (ANA)	7^{F}
Nicholas Sahakian (USA)	1
Amirhossein Abdevali (IRI)	2
Mohamed Abdelnaby Ahmed (EGY)	0
