= 2024 World Wrestling Championships – Men's Greco-Roman 82 kg =

Wrestling competitions

Men's Greco-Roman 82 kg at the 2024 World Championships
- Venue: Tirana Olympic Park
- Dates: 28–29 October 2024
- Competitors: 28 from 26 nations

Medalists
| gold medal | Mohammad Ali Geraei | Iran |
| silver medal | Erik Szilvássy | Hungary |
| bronze medal | Ahmet Yılmaz | Turkey |
| bronze medal | Gela Bolkvadze | Georgia |

The men's Greco-Roman 82 kilograms is a competition featured at the 2024 World Wrestling Championships, and was held in Tirana Olympic Park, Tirana, Albania on 28 and 29 October 2024.

This Greco-Roman wrestling competition consists of a single-elimination tournament, with a repechage used to determine the winner of two bronze medals. The two finalists face off for gold and silver medals. Each wrestler who loses to one of the two finalists moves into the repechage, culminating in a pair of bronze medal matches, featuring the semifinal losers each facing the remaining repechage opponent from their half of the bracket.

Each bout consists of a single round within a six-minute limit, including two halves of three minutes. The wrestler who scores more points is the winner.

== Results ==
Legend

- F — Won by fall
- R — Retired

=== Final ===
| Final |
| Erik Szilvássy (HUN) | 0 |
| Mohammad Ali Geraei (IRI) | 8 |

=== Top half ===
Round of 32
Gurban Gurbanov (AZE) | 9
Kevin Kupi (ALB) | 0
Artem Shapovalov (FIN) | 0
Yevgeniy Polivadov (KAZ) | 7
Jalgasbay Berdimuratov (UZB) | 6
Karen Khachatryan (ARM) | 0
Islam Aliev (AIN) | 3
Rosian Dermanski (BUL) | 1
Pascal Eisele (GER) | 4
Ruslan Abdiiev (UKR) | 3
Azat Salidinov (KGZ) | 4
Ahmet Yılmaz (TUR) | 7

Round of 16
Erik Szilvássy (HUN) | 2
Gurban Gurbanov (AZE) | 1
Yevgeniy Polivadov (KAZ) | 0
Jalgasbay Berdimuratov (UZB) | 9
Islam Aliev (AIN) | 12^{F}
Pascal Eisele (GER) | 0
Ahmet Yılmaz (TUR) | 5
Stanislau Shafarenka (AIN) | 3

Quarterfinals
Erik Szilvássy (HUN) | 6
Jalgasbay Berdimuratov (UZB) | 1
Islam Aliev (AIN) | 5
Ahmet Yılmaz (TUR) | 7

Semifinals
Erik Szilvássy (HUN) | 3
Ahmet Yılmaz (TUR) | 2

=== Bottom half ===
Round of 32
Matteo Maffezzoli (ITA) | 1
Ramon Betschart (SUI) | 3
Aliaksandr Kikiniou (USA) | 1
Albin Olofsson (SWE) | 5
Patryk Bednarz (POL) | 0
Karlo Kodrić (CRO) | 7
Taizo Yoshida (JPN) | 10
Wang Zhihuan (CHN) | 0
Hassan Barnawi (KSA) | 1
Sosruko Kodzokov (BRA) | 9
Rohit Dahiya (IND) | 0
Mohammad Ali Geraei (IRI) | 8

Round of 16
Gela Bolkvadze (GEO) | 1
Ramon Betschart (SUI) | 1
Albin Olofsson (SWE) | 9
Karlo Kodrić (CRO) | 9
Taizo Yoshida (JPN) | 9
Sosruko Kodzokov (BRA) | 0
Mohammad Ali Geraei (IRI) | 7
Mihail Bradu (MDA) | 2

Quarterfinals
Gela Bolkvadze (GEO) | 9
Karlo Kodrić (CRO) | 1
Taizo Yoshida (JPN) | 6
Mohammad Ali Geraei (IRI) | 14

Semifinals
Gela Bolkvadze (GEO) | 0
Mohammad Ali Geraei (IRI) | 2

=== Repechage ===
Repechage round 1
Rohit Dahiya (IND) | 0
Mihail Bradu (MDA) | 8

Repechage round 2
Gurban Gurbanov (AZE) | 5
Jalgasbay Berdimuratov (UZB) | 0
Mihail Bradu (MDA) | 0^{R}
Taizo Yoshida (JPN) | 5

Bronze medals
Gurban Gurbanov (AZE) | 1
Ahmet Yılmaz (TUR) | 8
Taizo Yoshida (JPN) | 2
Gela Bolkvadze (GEO) | 10

== Final standing ==
| Rank | Athlete |
|---|---|
| 1st place, gold medalist(s) | Mohammad Ali Geraei (IRI) |
| 2nd place, silver medalist(s) | Erik Szilvássy (HUN) |
| 3rd place, bronze medalist(s) | Ahmet Yılmaz (TUR) |
| 3rd place, bronze medalist(s) | Gela Bolkvadze (GEO) |
| 5 | Gurban Gurbanov (AZE) |
| 5 | Taizo Yoshida (JPN) |
| 7 | Islam Aliev (AIN) |
| 8 | Jalgasbay Berdimuratov (UZB) |
| 9 | Karlo Kodrić (CRO) |
| 10 | Mihail Bradu (MDA) |
| 11 | Sosruko Kodzokov (BRA) |
| 12 | Albin Olofsson (SWE) |
| 13 | Ramon Betschart (SUI) |
| 14 | Yevgeniy Polivadov (KAZ) |
| 15 | Pascal Eisele (GER) |
| 16 | Azat Salidinov (KGZ) |
| 17 | Ruslan Abdiiev (UKR) |
| 18 | Stanislau Shafarenka (AIN) |
| 19 | Rosian Dermanski (BUL) |
| 20 | Matteo Maffezzoli (ITA) |
| 21 | Aliaksandr Kikiniou (USA) |
| 22 | Hassan Barnawi (KSA) |
| 23 | Karen Khachatryan (ARM) |
| 24 | Artem Shapovalov (FIN) |
| 25 | Patryk Bednarz (POL) |
| 26 | Kevin Kupi (ALB) |
| 27 | Wang Zhihuan (CHN) |
| 28 | Rohit Dahiya (IND) |
