= Adlet Tiuliubaev =

Russian Greco-Roman wrestler

Adlet Tiuliubaev Адлет Тюлюбаев
Personal information
- Native name: Russian: Адлет Амангельдиевич Тюлюбаев
- Full name: Adlet Amangeldievitch Tiuliubaev
- Nationality: (Russia) Russian
- Born: 27 November 1995 (age 30) Russkaya Polyana, Omsk Oblast, Russia

Sport
- Country: Russia
- Sport: Wrestling
- Weight class: 72kg 77kg
- Rank: International Master of sports
- Event: Greco-Roman
- Coached by: Sergey Suvorov; Synzhigit Etekbaev
Medal record
Men's Greco-Roman
Representing UWW
European Championships
Silver medal – second place	2026 Tirana	82 kg
Grand Prix
Gold medal – first place	2025 Budapest	82 kg
Silver medal – second place	2026 Tirana	82 kg
Representing Individual Neutral Athletes
European Championships
Bronze medal – third place	2024 Bucharest	77 kg
Grand Prix
Gold medal – first place	2024 Cairo	77 kg
Gold medal – first place	2024 Mladenovac	77 kg
Silver medal – second place	2023 Mladenovac	77 kg
Representing Russia
Grand Prix
Gold medal – first place	2019 Madrid	72 kg
Gold medal – first place	2019 Tallinn	72 kg

Adlet Tiuliubaev (Russian: Адлет Амангельдиевич Тюлюбаев; born 27 November 1995) is a Russian Greco-Roman wrestler of Kazakh origin, who competes at 77 kilograms. He is the 2024 European Championships bronze medalist and 2022 Russian National Championships finalist.

== Biography ==
He was born into a Kazakh family on 27 November 1995 in township Russkaya Polyana, Omsk Oblast, Russia. He started playing ice hockey in primary school, but later changed this sport to Greco-Roman wrestling. His first coach was Synzhigit Etekbaev. At the age of 17 he moved to Omsk, where he currently lives and trains.

== Sport career ==
Adlet has some medals at senior national championships. In 2016, he won the bronze medal in the Greco-Roman event 72 kg at the Russian Championships. Adlet has also won distinction in international competition. In 2017, he competed at the U23 European championships in Hungary In 2018, Tiuliubaev was third at the Nesterenko memorial in Berdsk. In 2019, he took home gold at the Spanish Grand Prix. In October 2020, he finished with bronze medal at the Russian cup in Saint-Petersburg. In 2021, he won the Nesterenko memorial at 77 kilos. In February 2022, he was runner-up at the Russian Championships, where he lost to world champion Abuyazid Mantsigov of Vladimir Oblast in the final match. In May 2022, he earned the silver medal at the Poddubny wrestling league 1. In August 2022, Adlet competed at the All-Russian Spartakiad in Kazan and was finalist. In October 2022, he won the Poddubny wrestling league 2, in the final defeating world runner-up Sergey Kutuzov. In December 2022, he beat world champion Malkhas Amoyan of Armenia at the Poddubny wrestling league 3 in Bishkek, Kyrgyzstan In February 2023, Tiuliubaev took the bronze medal from the Russian Championships. In 2024, he was bronze medalist at the Russian Championships in Naro-Fominsk. After the Russian Championships his most notable international finish occurred at the 2024 European Championships held in Bucharest, Romania, where he won the bronze medal.

He competed at the 2024 European Wrestling Olympic Qualification Tournament in Baku, Azerbaijan hoping to qualify for the 2024 Summer Olympics in Paris, France. He was eliminated in his third match and he did not qualify for the Olympics.

== Wrestling Achievements ==
- 2018 Nesterenko memorial — 3rd;
- 2020 Russian cup — 3rd;
- 2021 Nesterenko memorial — 1st;
- 2016, 2023, 2024 Russian Championships — 3rd;
- 2022 Russian Championships — 2nd;
- 2022 All-Russian Spartakiad — 2nd;
- 2024 European Championships — 3rd;
