= Mas-Wrestling Federation of Armenia =

Sports organization of Armenia

Mas-Wrestling Federation of Armenia logo

The Mas-Wrestling Federation of Armenia (Armenian: Հայաստանի մաս-ըմբշամարտի ֆեդերացիա), is the regulating body of mas-wrestling in Armenia, governed by the Armenian Olympic Committee. The headquarters of the federation is located in Yerevan.

== History ==
The Mas-Wrestling Federation of Armenia is currently led by president Artavazd Nalbandyan. The Federation oversees the training of mas-wrestling specialists and organizes Armenia's participation in European and international level mas-wrestling competitions, including the Mas-Wrestling World Cup. The Federation also organizes national tournaments such as the "Armenian Mas-Wrestling Championships". The Federation is a full member of the International Mas-Wrestling Federation, within the "European Confederation".

== Activities ==
In 2015, the Mas-Wrestling World Cup and the European Championships were held in Armenia, where the Armenia national team came in second place in the team competitions, 37 countries participated in the events.

== See also ==
- Sport in Armenia
- Wrestling Federation of Armenia
- Wrestling in Armenia
