= Wrestling Federation of Armenia =

Sporting Organization

Wrestling Federation of Armenia logo

The Wrestling Federation of Armenia (Armenian: Հայաստանի ըմբշամարտի ֆեդերացիա), is the regulating body of wrestling in Armenia, governed by the Armenian Olympic Committee. The headquarters of the federation is located in Yerevan.

== History ==
The Federation is currently led by president Hrachya Rostomyan. The Federation is a full member of United World Wrestling and the European Council of Associated Wrestling.

The Federation oversees freestyle wrestling, Greco-Roman, women's wrestling, beach wrestling, and grappling in Armenia. The Federation sends competitors to participate in the Wrestling World Cup, the World Wrestling Championships, and the European Wrestling Championships. Armenian wrestlers have won several medals participating in wrestling at the Summer Olympics.

State funding for the Federation increased in 2018. The Armenian government approved the increase in order to help Armenian wrestlers to successfully participate in international tournaments and gain ratings ahead of the 2020 Olympic Games.

In February 2021, the Wrestling Federation of Armenia signed a memorandum of cooperation with the Grappling Federation of Armenia.

== See also ==
- Mas-Wrestling Federation of Armenia
- Professional wrestling
- Sport in Armenia
- Wrestling in Armenia
