= 2022 European Wrestling Championships – Men's Greco-Roman 77 kg =

Wrestling competition

Men's Greco-Roman 77 kg at the 2022 European Wrestling Championships
- Venue: BOK Sports Hall
- Location: Budapest, Hungary
- Dates: 1–2 April
- Competitors: 18

Medalists
gold medal	Malkhas Amoyan	Armenia
silver medal	Yunus Emre Başar	Turkey
bronze medal	Sanan Suleymanov	Azerbaijan
bronze medal	Aik Mnatsakanian	Bulgaria

The Men's Greco-Roman 77 kg is a competition featured at the 2022 European Wrestling Championships, and was held in Budapest, Hungary on April 1 and 2.

== Results ==
Legend

- F — Won by fall

=== Final ===
Final
Malkhas Amoyan (ARM)	4
Yunus Emre Başar (TUR)	3

=== Top half ===
Round of 32
Malkhas Amoyan (ARM)	9
Mantas Sinkevičius (LTU)	0

Round of 16
Sanan Suleymanov (AZE)	9
Ilie Cojocari (ROU)	0
Malkhas Amoyan (ARM)	5
Denis Horváth (SVK)	1
Matias Lipasti (FIN)	2
Albin Olofsson (SWE)	6^{F}
Ciro Russo (ITA)	4
Oliver Krüger (DEN)	1

Quarterfinals
Sanan Suleymanov (AZE)	5
Malkhas Amoyan (ARM)	6
Albin Olofsson (SWE)	4^{F}
Ciro Russo (ITA)	0

Semifinals
Malkhas Amoyan (ARM)	9
Albin Olofsson (SWE)	0

=== Bottom half ===
Round of 32
Aik Mnatsakanian (BUL)	7
Beka Mamukashvili (GEO)	1

Round of 16
Yunus Emre Başar (TUR)	9
Ibrahim Ghanem (FRA)	0
Yasaf Zeinalov (UKR)	1
Antonio Kamenjašević (CRO)	3
Patryk Bednarz (POL)	0
Aik Mnatsakanian (BUL)	9
Zoltán Lévai (HUN)	3
Viktor Nemeš (SRB)	1

Quarterfinals
Yunus Emre Başar (TUR)	9
Antonio Kamenjašević (CRO)	0
Aik Mnatsakanian (BUL)	5
Zoltán Lévai (HUN)	1

Semifinals
Yunus Emre Başar (TUR)	7
Aik Mnatsakanian (BUL)	3

=== Repechage ===
Repechage round 1
Mantas Sinkevičius (LTU)	10
Denis Horváth (SVK)	3

Repechage round 2
Mantas Sinkevičius (LTU)	0
Sanan Suleymanov (AZE)	8
Ibrahim Ghanem (FRA)	1
Antonio Kamenjašević (CRO)	5

Bronze medal match
Sanan Suleymanov (AZE)	5
Albin Olofsson (SWE)	0
Antonio Kamenjašević (CRO)	0
Aik Mnatsakanian (BUL)	4

== Final standing ==
Rank	Wrestler	UWW Points
1st place, gold medalist(s)	Malkhas Amoyan (ARM)	15000
2nd place, silver medalist(s)	Yunus Emre Başar (TUR)	13000
3rd place, bronze medalist(s)	Sanan Suleymanov (AZE)	11500
3rd place, bronze medalist(s)	Aik Mnatsakanian (BUL)	11500
5	Albin Olofsson (SWE)	10000
5	Antonio Kamenjašević (CRO)	10000
7	Zoltán Lévai (HUN)	9400
8	Mantas Sinkevičius (LTU)	9000
9	Ciro Russo (ITA)	8500
10	Denis Horváth (SVK)	8100
11	Viktor Nemeš (SRB)	6000
12	Yasaf Zeinalov (UKR)	5800
13	Oliver Krüger (DEN)	5600
14	Beka Mamukashvili (GEO)	5400
15	Ibrahim Ghanem (FRA)	5200
16	Matias Lipasti (FIN)	5100
17	Ilie Cojocari (ROU)	0
18	Patryk Bednarz (POL)	0
