= Aik Mnatsakanian =

Bulgarian sport wrestler (born 1995)

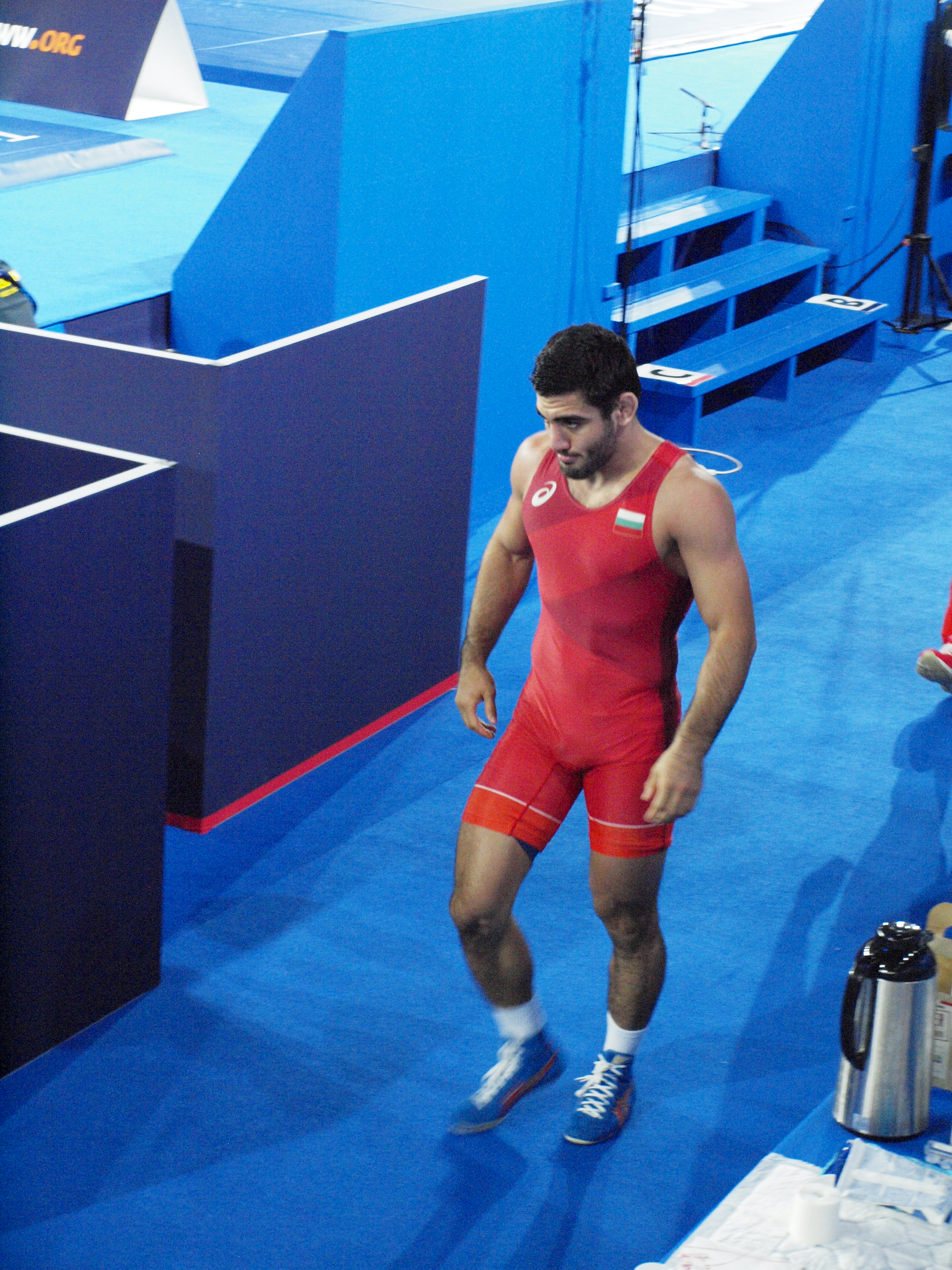
- Aik Mnatsakanian at the 2021 World Wrestling Championships in Oslo, Norway

Personal information
- Born: 14 October 1995 (age 31) Akhalkalaki, Georgia
- Height: 1.70 m (5 ft 7 in)
- Weight: 72 kg (159 lb)

Sport
- Country: Bulgaria
- Sport: Wrestling
- Event: Greco-Roman
- Club: CSKA Sofia
Medal record
Men's Greco-Roman wrestling
Representing Bulgaria
World Championships
| Bronze medal – third place | 2018 Budapest | 72 kg |
| Bronze medal – third place | 2019 Nur-Sultan | 72 kg |
European Championships
| Bronze medal – third place | 2022 Budapest | 77 kg |
| Bronze medal – third place | 2019 Bucharest | 72 kg |
Grand Prix
| Silver medal – second place | 2026 Ulaanbaatar | 82 kg |

Aik Mnatsakanian (Armenian: Հայկ Մնացականյան; Bulgarian: Айк Мнацаканян; born 14 October 1995) is a Georgian-born Bulgarian sport wrestler of Armenian descent who competes in the men's Greco Roman category. He has claimed two bronze medals in the World Wrestling Championships both in the men's 72 kg category in 2018 and in 2019. He competed in the men's 77 kg event at the 2020 Summer Olympics in Tokyo, Japan.

In March 2021, he competed at the European Qualification Tournament in Budapest, Hungary hoping to qualify for the 2020 Summer Olympics in Tokyo, Japan. He did not qualify at this tournament but he was able to qualify at the World Olympic Qualification Tournament held in Sofia, Bulgaria.

He won one of the bronze medals in the 77 kg event at the European Wrestling Championships held in Budapest, Hungary. He competed in the 77 kg event at the 2022 World Wrestling Championships held in Belgrade, Serbia.

He earned a quota place for Bulgaria for the 2024 Summer Olympics at the 2024 World Wrestling Olympic Qualification Tournament held in Istanbul, Turkey. He competed in the 77 kg event at the Olympics in Paris, France.
