= 2021 European Wrestling Championships – Men's Greco-Roman 72 kg =

Wrestling competition

The Men's Greco-Roman 72 kg is a competition featured at the 2021 European Wrestling Championships, and was held in Warsaw, Poland on April 24 and April 25.

== Medalists ==
Gold	Shmagi Bolkvadze; Georgia
Silver	Malkhas Amoyan; Armenia
Bronze	Maksym Yevtushenko; Ukraine
Bronze	Róbert Fritsch; Hungary

== Results ==
Legend

- F — Won by fall

=== Final ===
Final
Malkhas Amoyan (ARM)	1
Shmagi Bolkvadze (GEO)	4

=== Top half ===
Round of 32

Round of 16
Selçuk Can (TUR)	6
Frank Stäbler (GER)	6
Roman Pacurkowski (POL)	9
Christoph Burger (AUT)	0
Malkhas Amoyan (ARM)	9
Alen Fodor (CRO)	0
Maksym Yevtushenko (UKR)	7^{F}
Anton Korabau (BLR)	1

Quarterfinals
Selçuk Can (TUR)	3
Roman Pacurkowski (POL)	11
Malkhas Amoyan (ARM)	5
Maksym Yevtushenko (UKR)	0

Semifinals
Roman Pacurkowski (POL)	0
Malkhas Amoyan (ARM)	6

=== Bottom half ===
Round of 32
Ibrahim Ghanem (FRA)	3
Róbert Fritsch (HUN)	4
Khasay Hasanli (AZE)	5
Valentin Petic (MDA)	3
Aleksandar Maksimović (SRB)	8
Sebastian Aak (NOR)	0

Round of 16
Daniel Soini (SWE)	0
Shmagi Bolkvadze (GEO)	4
Leoš Drmola (SVK)	1
Chingiz Labazanov (RUS)	6
Mikko Peltokangas (FIN)	3
Róbert Fritsch (HUN)	5
Khasay Hasanli (AZE)	2
Aleksandar Maksimović (SRB)	3

Quarterfinals
Shmagi Bolkvadze (GEO)	2
Chingiz Labazanov (RUS)	0
Róbert Fritsch (HUN)	5
Aleksandar Maksimović (SRB)	1

Semifinals
Shmagi Bolkvadze (GEO)	3
Róbert Fritsch (HUN)	1

=== Repechage ===
Repechage round 2
Alen Fodor (CRO)	0
Maksym Yevtushenko (UKR)	11
Daniel Soini (SWE)	1
Chingiz Labazanov (RUS)	5

Bronze medal match
Maksym Yevtushenko (UKR)	11
Roman Pacurkowski (POL)	0
Chingiz Labazanov (RUS)	0
Róbert Fritsch (HUN)	3

== Final standing ==
Rank	Athlete
1st place, gold medalist(s)	Shmagi Bolkvadze (GEO)
2nd place, silver medalist(s)	Malkhas Amoyan (ARM)
3rd place, bronze medalist(s)	Maksym Yevtushenko (UKR)
3rd place, bronze medalist(s)	Róbert Fritsch (HUN)
5	Roman Pacurkowski (POL)
5	Chingiz Labazanov (RUS)
7	Aleksandar Maksimović (SRB)
8	Selçuk Can (TUR)
9	Khasay Hasanli (AZE)
10	Frank Stäbler (GER)
11	Ibrahim Ghanem (FRA)
12	Mikko Peltokangas (FIN)
13	Valentin Petic (MDA)
14	Leoš Drmola (SVK)
15	Daniel Soini (SWE)
16	Anton Korabau (BLR)
17	Sebastian Aak (NOR)
18	Christoph Burger (AUT)
19	Alen Fodor (CRO)
