= 2025 World Wrestling Championships =

2025 World Championships
- Host city: Zagreb, Croatia
- Dates: 13–21 September 2025
- Stadium: Arena Zagreb

Champions
- Freestyle: Iran
- Greco-Roman: Iran
- Women: Japan

The 2025 World Wrestling Championships was held from 13 to 21 September 2025 in Zagreb, Croatia. The venue of the competition was Arena Zagreb. It was the first World Wrestling Championships hosted by Croatia. 776 wrestlers from 76 countries participated. Host country Croatia competed with 14 wrestlers.

Organization of the Championship was supported by the Government of Croatia (Ministry of Finance and Ministry of Tourism and Sports) with €4 million. Organization costs of the tournament were estimated at €8 million. Around 1200 wrestlers from around a hundred countries were expected to compete. Championship is supported by the City of Zagreb, Ministry of Tourism and Sports, Zagreb and Croatia Tourist Boards, Croatian Olympic Committee, Croatian Post, JANAF and HEP. The event was opened on 13 September 2025 in Arena Zagreb by the prime minister of Croatia Andrej Plenković.

The competition ended with a long-awaited dominant display by the Iranian team, resulting in their conquering of this competition across the board with 325 Team Points and making history by sweeping both freestyle and Greco-Roman categories, while Japan won in women's.

== Competition schedule ==
All times are (UTC+2:00)

Date	Time	Event
13 September	10.30–15.00	Qualification rounds: FS 61–70–86–125 kg
13 September	19:00–20.30	Semi-finals: FS 61–70–86–125 kg
14 September	10.30–14.30	Qualification rounds: FS 79–92–57–74 kg; Repechage: FS 61–70–86–125 kg
14 September	16.45–17.45	Semi-finals: FS 79–92–57–74 kg
14 September	18.00–21.00	Finals: FS 61–70–86–125 kg
15 September	10.30–15.00	Qualification rounds: FS 65–97 kg / WW 55–59 kg; Repechage: FS 79–92–57–74 kg
15 September	17.00–18.00	Semi-finals: FS 65–97 kg / WW 55–59 kg
15 September	18.00–21.00	Finals: FS 79–92–57–74 kg
16 September	10.30–14.30	Qualification rounds: WW 65–50–57–76 kg; Repechage: FS 65–97 kg / WW 55–59 kg
16 September	16.45–17.45	Semi-finals: WW 65–50–57–76 kg
16 September	18.00–21.00	Finals: FS 65–97 kg / WW 55–59 kg
17 September	10.30–14.00	Qualification rounds: WW 72–53–62–68 kg; Repechage: WW 65–50–57–76 kg
17 September	16.45–17.45	Semi-finals: WW 72–53–62–68 kg
17 September	18.00–21.00	Finals: WW 65–50–57–76 kg
18 September	10.30–14.00	Qualification rounds: GR 55–82–77–130 kg; Repechage: WW 72–53–62–68 kg
18 September	16.45–17.45	Semi-finals: GR 55–82–77–130 kg
18 September	18.00–21.00	Finals: WW 72–53–62–68 kg
19 September	10.30–14.00	Qualification rounds: GR 72–60–97 kg; Repechage: GR 55–82–77–130 kg
19 September	17.00–17.45	Semi-finals: GR 72–60–97 kg
19 September	18.00–21.00	Finals: GR 55–82–77–130 kg
20 September	10.30–14.00	Qualification rounds: GR 63–67–87 kg; Repechage: GR 72–60–97 kg
20 September	17.00–17.45	Semi-finals: GR 63–67–87 kg
20 September	18.00–20.30	Finals: GR 72–60–97 kg
21 September	16.30–17.30	Repechage: GR 63–67–87 kg
21 September	18:00–20.30	Finals: GR 63–67–87 kg

== Medal table ==
* Host nation (Croatia)

Rank	Nation	Gold	Silver	Bronze	Total
1	Japan	7	3	3	13
2	Iran	6	4	5	15
3	United States	4	1	3	8
4	North Korea	3	2	2	7
–	United World Wrestling	1	4	8	13
5	Azerbaijan	1	2	5	8
6	Uzbekistan	1	1	3	5
7	Ecuador	1	1	0	2
7	Georgia	1	1	0	2
7	Ukraine	1	1	0	2
10	Armenia	1	0	3	4
11	Kazakhstan	1	0	2	3
12	Greece	1	0	0	1
12	Serbia	1	0	0	1
14	Kyrgyzstan	0	2	3	5
15	China	0	1	4	5
16	Mongolia	0	1	3	4
17	Turkey	0	1	2	3
18	Hungary	0	1	1	2
19	Albania	0	1	0	1
19	Bulgaria	0	1	0	1
19	France	0	1	0	1
19	South Korea	0	1	0	1
23	Bahrain	0	0	3	3
24	Moldova	0	0	2	2
25	Canada	0	0	1	1
25	Croatia*	0	0	1	1
25	Cuba	0	0	1	1
25	Finland	0	0	1	1
25	India	0	0	1	1
25	Poland	0	0	1	1
25	Romania	0	0	1	1
25	Slovakia	0	0	1	1
Totals (32 entries)		30	30	60	120

== Team ranking ==
Rank	Men's freestyle		Men's Greco-Roman		Women's freestyle	
Rank	Team	Points	Team	Points	Team	Points
1	Iran	145	Iran	180	Japan	162
2	United States	134	Azerbaijan	89	North Korea	115
3	Japan	111	Uzbekistan	72	China	87
4	Azerbaijan	83	Georgia	65	United States	83
5	Bahrain	53	Armenia	63	Ukraine	75
6	Kazakhstan	48	Kazakhstan	57	Turkey	67
7	Kyrgyzstan	41	Hungary	57	Mongolia	65
8	North Korea	35	Serbia	45	Ecuador	47
9	Mongolia	30	Kyrgyzstan	45	Kyrgyzstan	35
10	Uzbekistan	30	Ukraine	42	India	35

== Medal summary ==
=== Men's freestyle ===
Event	Gold	Silver	Bronze
57 kg	Han Chong-song; North Korea	Bekzat Almaz Uulu; Kyrgyzstan	Arsen Harutyunyan; Armenia
57 kg	Han Chong-song; North Korea	Bekzat Almaz Uulu; Kyrgyzstan	Gulomjon Abdullaev; Uzbekistan
61 kg	Zaur Uguev; United World Wrestling	Ahmad Javan; Iran	Assylzhan Yessengeldi; Kazakhstan
61 kg	Zaur Uguev; United World Wrestling	Ahmad Javan; Iran	Nuraddin Novruzov; Azerbaijan
65 kg	Rahman Amouzad; Iran	Kotaro Kiyooka; Japan	Real Woods; United States
65 kg	Rahman Amouzad; Iran	Kotaro Kiyooka; Japan	Umidjon Jalolov; Uzbekistan
70 kg	Yoshinosuke Aoyagi; Japan	Tömör-Ochiryn Tulga; Mongolia	Ernazar Akmataliev; Kyrgyzstan
70 kg	Yoshinosuke Aoyagi; Japan	Tömör-Ochiryn Tulga; Mongolia	Nurkozha Kaipanov; Kazakhstan
74 kg	Kota Takahashi; Japan	Chermen Valiev; Albania	Zaurbek Sidakov; United World Wrestling
74 kg	Kota Takahashi; Japan	Chermen Valiev; Albania	Tajmuraz Salkazanov; Slovakia
79 kg	Georgios Kougioumtsidis; Greece	Levi Haines; United States	Mohammad Nokhodi; Iran
79 kg	Georgios Kougioumtsidis; Greece	Levi Haines; United States	Khidir Saipudinov; Bahrain
86 kg	Zahid Valencia; United States	Hayato Ishiguro; Japan	Kamran Ghasempour; Iran
86 kg	Zahid Valencia; United States	Hayato Ishiguro; Japan	Arsenii Dzhioev; Azerbaijan
92 kg	Trent Hidlay; United States	Amanula Gadzhimagomedov; United World Wrestling	Osman Nurmagomedov; Azerbaijan
92 kg	Trent Hidlay; United States	Amanula Gadzhimagomedov; United World Wrestling	Amir Hossein Firouzpour; Iran
97 kg	Kyle Snyder; United States	Amir Ali Azarpira; Iran	Akhmed Tazhudinov; Bahrain
97 kg	Kyle Snyder; United States	Amir Ali Azarpira; Iran	Arash Yoshida; Japan
125 kg	Amir Hossein Zare; Iran	Giorgi Meshvildishvili; Azerbaijan	Robert Baran; Poland
125 kg	Amir Hossein Zare; Iran	Giorgi Meshvildishvili; Azerbaijan	Shamil Sharipov; Bahrain

=== Men's Greco-Roman ===
Event	Gold	Silver	Bronze
55 kg	Vakhtang Lolua; Georgia	Payam Ahmadi; Iran	Eldaniz Azizli; Azerbaijan
55 kg	Vakhtang Lolua; Georgia	Payam Ahmadi; Iran	Shi Huoying; China
60 kg	Aidos Sultangali; Kazakhstan	Alisher Ganiev; Uzbekistan	Ri Se-ung; North Korea
60 kg	Aidos Sultangali; Kazakhstan	Alisher Ganiev; Uzbekistan	Hrachya Poghosyan; Armenia
63 kg	Aytjan Khalmakhanov; Uzbekistan	Chung Han-jae; South Korea	Mohammad Mehdi Keshtkar; Iran
63 kg	Aytjan Khalmakhanov; Uzbekistan	Chung Han-jae; South Korea	Vitalie Eriomenco; Moldova
67 kg	Saeid Esmaeili; Iran	Hasrat Jafarov; Azerbaijan	Daniial Agaev; United World Wrestling
67 kg	Saeid Esmaeili; Iran	Hasrat Jafarov; Azerbaijan	Slavik Galstyan; Armenia
72 kg	Ulvu Ganizade; Azerbaijan	Ibrahim Ghanem; France	Abdullo Aliev; Uzbekistan
72 kg	Ulvu Ganizade; Azerbaijan	Ibrahim Ghanem; France	Danial Sohrabi; Iran
77 kg	Malkhas Amoyan; Armenia	Nao Kusaka; Japan	Róbert Fritsch; Hungary
77 kg	Malkhas Amoyan; Armenia	Nao Kusaka; Japan	Ahmet Yılmaz; Turkey
82 kg	Gholamreza Farrokhi; Iran	Gela Bolkvadze; Georgia	Karlo Kodrić; Croatia
82 kg	Gholamreza Farrokhi; Iran	Gela Bolkvadze; Georgia	Taizo Yoshida; Japan
87 kg	Aleksandr Komarov; Serbia	Alireza Mohmadi; Iran	Milad Alirzaev; United World Wrestling
87 kg	Aleksandr Komarov; Serbia	Alireza Mohmadi; Iran	Asan Zhanyshov; Kyrgyzstan
97 kg	Mohammad Hadi Saravi; Iran	Artur Sargsian; United World Wrestling	Kiryl Maskevich; United World Wrestling
97 kg	Mohammad Hadi Saravi; Iran	Artur Sargsian; United World Wrestling	Murad Ahmadiyev; Azerbaijan
130 kg	Amin Mirzazadeh; Iran	Dárius Vitek; Hungary	Elias Kuosmanen; Finland
130 kg	Amin Mirzazadeh; Iran	Dárius Vitek; Hungary	Pavel Hlinchuk; United World Wrestling

=== Women's freestyle ===
Event	Gold	Silver	Bronze
50 kg	Won Myong-gyong; North Korea	Zhang Yu; China	Elizaveta Smirnova; United World Wrestling
50 kg	Won Myong-gyong; North Korea	Zhang Yu; China	Evin Demirhan Yavuz; Turkey
53 kg	Haruna Murayama; Japan	Lucía Yépez; Ecuador	Choe Hyo-gyong; North Korea
53 kg	Haruna Murayama; Japan	Lucía Yépez; Ecuador	Antim Panghal; India
55 kg	Oh Kyong-ryong; North Korea	Ekaterina Verbina; United World Wrestling	Sowaka Uchida; Japan
55 kg	Oh Kyong-ryong; North Korea	Ekaterina Verbina; United World Wrestling	Andreea Ana; Romania
57 kg	Helen Maroulis; United States	Son Il-sim; North Korea	Olga Khoroshavtseva; United World Wrestling
57 kg	Helen Maroulis; United States	Son Il-sim; North Korea	Hong Kexin; China
59 kg	Sakura Onishi; Japan	Mariia Vynnyk; Ukraine	Togtokhyn Altjin; Mongolia
59 kg	Sakura Onishi; Japan	Mariia Vynnyk; Ukraine	Laurence Beauregard; Canada
62 kg	Sakura Motoki; Japan	Kim Ok-ju; North Korea	Pürevdorjiin Orkhon; Mongolia
62 kg	Sakura Motoki; Japan	Kim Ok-ju; North Korea	Amina Tandelova; United World Wrestling
65 kg	Miwa Morikawa; Japan	Alina Kasabieva; United World Wrestling	Irina Rîngaci; Moldova
65 kg	Miwa Morikawa; Japan	Alina Kasabieva; United World Wrestling	Tüvshinjargalyn Enkhjin; Mongolia
68 kg	Ami Ishii; Japan	Yuliana Yaneva; Bulgaria	Kennedy Blades; United States
68 kg	Ami Ishii; Japan	Yuliana Yaneva; Bulgaria	Long Jia; China
72 kg	Alla Belinska; Ukraine	Nesrin Baş; Turkey	Nurzat Nurtaeva; Kyrgyzstan
72 kg	Alla Belinska; Ukraine	Nesrin Baş; Turkey	Li Zelu; China
76 kg	Génesis Reasco; Ecuador	Aiperi Medet Kyzy; Kyrgyzstan	Kylie Welker; United States
76 kg	Génesis Reasco; Ecuador	Aiperi Medet Kyzy; Kyrgyzstan	Milaimys Marín; Cuba

== Participating nations ==
776 wrestlers from 76 countries participated:

1. Albania (5)
2. Algeria (8)
3. Armenia (15)
4. American Samoa (1)
5. Australia (4)
6. Austria (6)
7. Azerbaijan (23)
8. Bahamas (1)
9. Belgium (3)
10. Brazil (6)
11. Bahrain (6)
12. Bulgaria (14)
13. Canada (15)
14. Chile (3)
15. China (30)
16. Cape Verde (2)
17. Colombia (1)
18. Costa Rica (1)
19. Croatia (14) (Host)
20. Cuba (7)
21. Czech Republic (4)
22. Denmark (1)
23. Ecuador (5)
24. Egypt (3)
25. Spain (6)
26. Estonia (2)
27. Finland (5)
28. France (9)
29. Georgia (20)
30. Germany (14)
31. Greece (4)
32. Honduras (2)
33. Hungary (14)
34. India (30)
35. Iran (20)
36. Iraq (4)
37. Israel (2)
38. Italy (10)
39. Japan (30)
40. Kazakhstan (29)
41. Kyrgyzstan (19)
42. South Korea (28)
43. Kosovo (1)
44. Latvia (3)
45. Lithuania (11)
46. Moldova (18)
47. Mexico (12)
48. Mongolia (21)
49. North Macedonia (6)
50. Netherlands (1)
51. Nigeria (3)
52. Norway (5)
53. Philippines (2)
54. Palestine (2)
55. Poland (15)
56. North Korea (14)
57. Puerto Rico (6)
58. Qatar (4)
59. Romania (10)
60. Singapore (2)
61. Sri Lanka (1)
62. Sierra Leone (1)
63. Serbia (7)
64. Switzerland (8)
65. Slovakia (6)
66. Sweden (10)
67. Tajikistan (4)
68. Turkmenistan (5)
69. Chinese Taipei (2)
70. Tunisia (2)
71. Turkey (30)
72. Ukraine (30)
73. United States (30)
74. Uzbekistan (19)
75. Venezuela (5)
76. Yemen (1)
77. United World Wrestling (Russia+Belarus) (50)

== See also ==
- List of World Championships medalists in wrestling (freestyle)
- List of World Championships medalists in wrestling (Greco-Roman)
- List of World Championships medalists in wrestling (women)
