= Ahmet Yılmaz =

Turkish Greco-Roman wrestler

Personal information
- Born: 2 February 1996 (age 30) Muş, Turkey
- Height: 1.77 m (5 ft 10 in)
- Weight: 82 kg (181 lb; 12.9 st)

Sport
- Country: Turkey
- Sport: Amateur wrestling
- Event: Greco-Roman
Medal record
Men's Greco-Roman wrestling
Representing Turkey
World Championships
Bronze medal – third place	2024 Tirana	82 kg
Bronze medal – third place	2025 Zagreb	77 kg
European Championships
Bronze medal – third place	2025 Bratislava	77 kg
Vehbi Emre & Hamit Kaplan Tournament
Gold medal – first place	2026 Antalya	77 kg
Dan Kolov - Nikola Petrov Tournament
Bronze medal – third place	2023 Sofia	77 kg
Grand Prix
Gold medal – first place	2025 Ulaanbaatar	77 kg
Silver medal – second place	2021 Zagreb	72 kg
Bronze medal – third place	2020 Warsaw	72 kg

Ahmet Yılmaz (born 2 February 1996) is a Turkish Greco-Roman wrestler competing in the 82 kg division.

== Career ==
At the 2024 World Wrestling Championships in Tirana, Albania, he reached the semifinals of the men's Greco-Roman 82 kg category by defeating Kyrgyz Azat Salidinov 7–4 in the first round, Belarusian Stanislau Shafarenka 5–3 in the second round, and Russia's Islam Aliev 7–5 in the quarterfinals. He lost 3–2 to Hungarian Erik Szilvássy in the semifinals. In the bronze medal match, he defeated Azerbaijan's Gurban Gurbanov 8-1 and won the bronze medal.

At the 2025 World Wrestling Championships in Zagreb, Croatia, Yılmaz competed in the men's Greco-Roman 77 kg event. In his opening match, he defeated Qatar's Saoud Berak Almefoaey by technical superiority, 10–0. In the subsequent round, he overcame Bulgaria's Stoyan Kubatov 5–3 to reach the quarterfinals. In the quarterfinal, he was defeated by Armenian wrestler Malkhas Amoyan, but as Amoyan advanced to the final, Yılmaz qualified for the repechage. In the repechage round, he defeated American Kamal Bey 4–2 to gain entry into the bronze medal match. There, Yılmaz faced Iran's Alireza Abdevali and secured the bronze medal with a 6–3 victory.
