= Taizo Yoshida =

Japanese Greco-Roman wrestler

Personal information
- Nationality: Japanese
- Born: 24 April 2006 Kanagawa Prefecture, Japan

Professional wrestling career
- Sport: Amateur wrestling
- Weight class: 82 kg, 87 kg
Medal record
Representing Japan
World Wrestling Championships
Bronze medal – third place	2025 Zagreb	82 kg
Asian Wrestling Championships
Gold medal – first place	2024 Bishkek	82 kg
U20 World Championships
Gold medal – first place	2026 Bratislava	87 kg
Bronze medal – third place	2024 Pontevedra	82 kg
Bronze medal – third place	2025 Samokov	82 kg
U17 World Championships
Gold medal – first place	2023 Istanbul	80 kg
Asian Games
Gold medal – first place	2026 Aichi-Nagoya	87 kg

Taizo Yoshida (Japanese: 吉田 泰造, born 24 April 2006) is a Japanese Greco-Roman wrestler. He won the gold medal in the men's 87 kg event at the 2026 Asian Games in Aichi-Nagoya, Japan. He is also a world champion at both the under-17 and under-20 levels and won a bronze medal at the 2025 World Wrestling Championships.

== Career ==
Yoshida emerged as one of Japan's leading young Greco-Roman wrestlers in 2023, when he won the gold medal in the 80 kg category at the U17 World Championships in Istanbul, Turkey. In 2024, he won the 82 kg title at the 2024 Asian Wrestling Championships in Bishkek, Kyrgyzstan. Later that year, he became one of the few high school students to win a men's title at Japan's Emperor's Cup All-Japan Championships, taking the Greco-Roman 82 kg title.

At the 2025 World Wrestling Championships in Zagreb, Croatia, Yoshida won the bronze medal in the men's Greco-Roman 82 kg event. He defeated Adlet Tiuliubaev of Russia in the bronze-medal match, earning his first senior world championship medal. He also won bronze medals at the 2024 and 2025 U20 World Championships in the 82 kg category.

In August 2026, Yoshida won the gold medal in the 87 kg category at the U20 World Championships in Bratislava, Slovakia. He defeated Iurik Petrosian of Armenia 8–0 in the final, becoming Japan's first U20 world champion in Greco-Roman wrestling.

At the 2026 Asian Games in Aichi-Nagoya, Yoshida competed in the men's Greco-Roman 87 kg event. He defeated Callum Roberts of the Philippines 10–0 in the second round and Sunil Kumar of India 11–0 in the semi-final. In the final, he defeated defending Asian champion Asan Zhanyshov of Kyrgyzstan 11–1 to win the gold medal. The victory made him the youngest Japanese men's Greco-Roman Asian Games champion at the time.
