= Ramaz Zoidze =

Georgian Greco-Roman wrestler

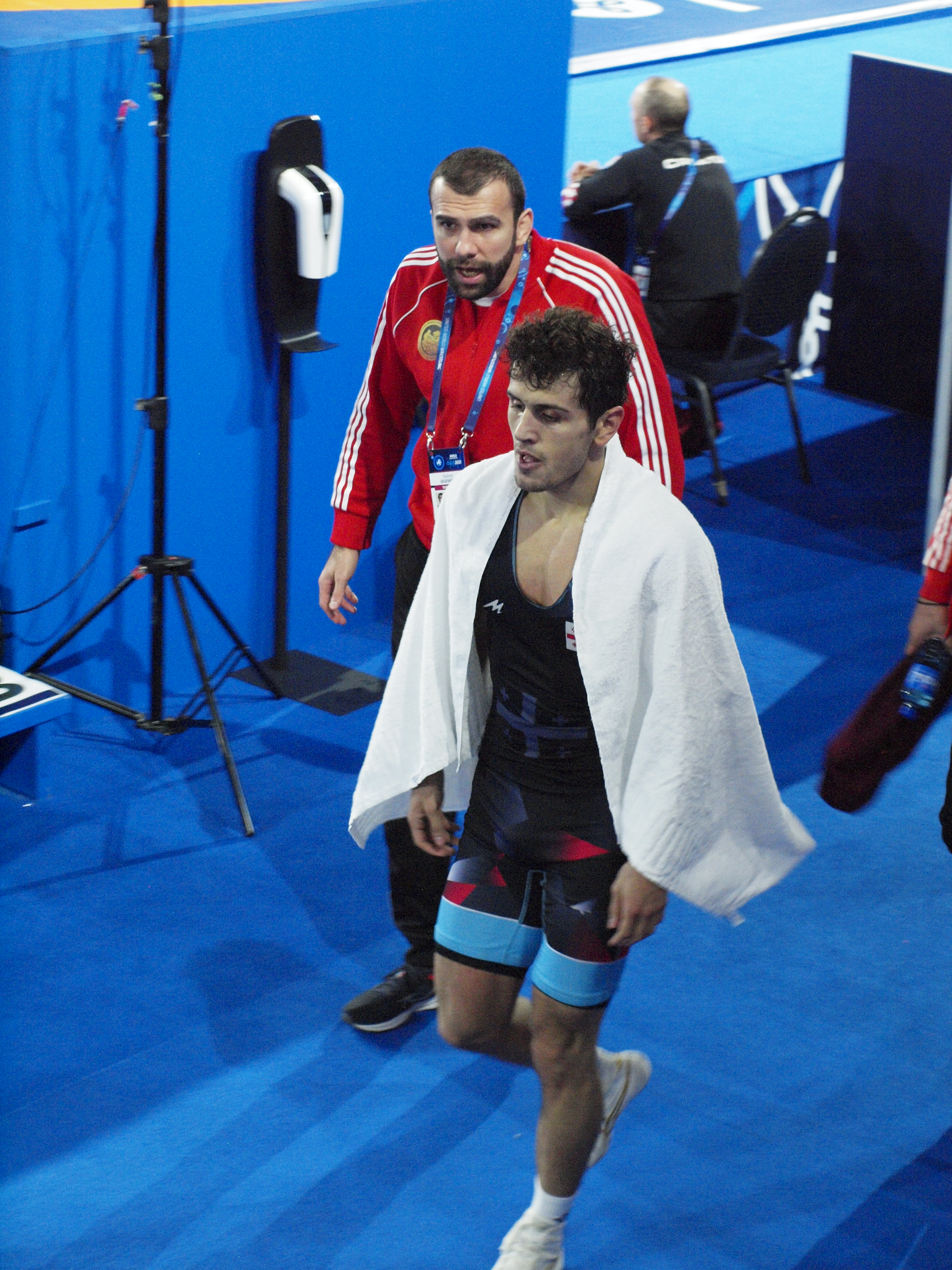
- Ramaz Zoidze at the 2021 World Wrestling Championships in Oslo, Norway

Personal information
- Native name: რამაზ ზოიძე
- Nationality: Georgia
- Born: 13 February 1996 (age 30) Batumi, Georgia
- Height: 175 cm (5 ft 9 in)

Sport
- Country: Georgia
- Sport: Amateur wrestling
- Weight class: 72 kg
- Event: Greco-Roman
Medal record
Men's Greco-Roman wrestling
Representing Georgia
World Championships
Bronze medal – third place	2021 Oslo	67 kg
European Championships
Silver medal – second place	2025 Bratislava	77 kg
World U23 Championship
Silver medal – second place	2018 Bucharest	72 kg
European U23 Championship
Gold medal – first place	2019 Novi Sad	72 kg
Gold medal – first place	2018 Istanbul	72 kg
Gold medal – first place	2017 Szombathely	71 kg
Bronze medal – third place	2016 Russe	71 kg

Ramaz Zoidze (Georgian: რამაზ ზოიძე, born 13 February 1996) is a Georgian Greco-Roman wrestler. He won one of the bronze medals in the 67 kg event at the 2021 World Wrestling Championships held in Oslo, Norway. He also represented Georgia at the 2020 Summer Olympics held in Tokyo, Japan.

== Career ==
In 2018, Zoidze won the gold medal in the men's 72 kg event at the European U23 Wrestling Championship held in Istanbul, Turkey. In the same year, he won the silver medal in his event at the 2018 World U23 Wrestling Championship held in Bucharest, Romania.

In 2019, he was eliminated in his first match in the 72 kg event at the European Wrestling Championships held in Bucharest, Romania.

In March 2021, Zoidze qualified at the European Qualification Tournament to compete at the 2020 Summer Olympics in Tokyo, Japan. At the Olympics, he lost his bronze medal match in the 67 kg event.

Zoidze competed in the 67 kg event at the 2024 Summer Olympics in Paris, France.
