= Malkhas Amoyan =

Armenian Greco-Roman wrestler

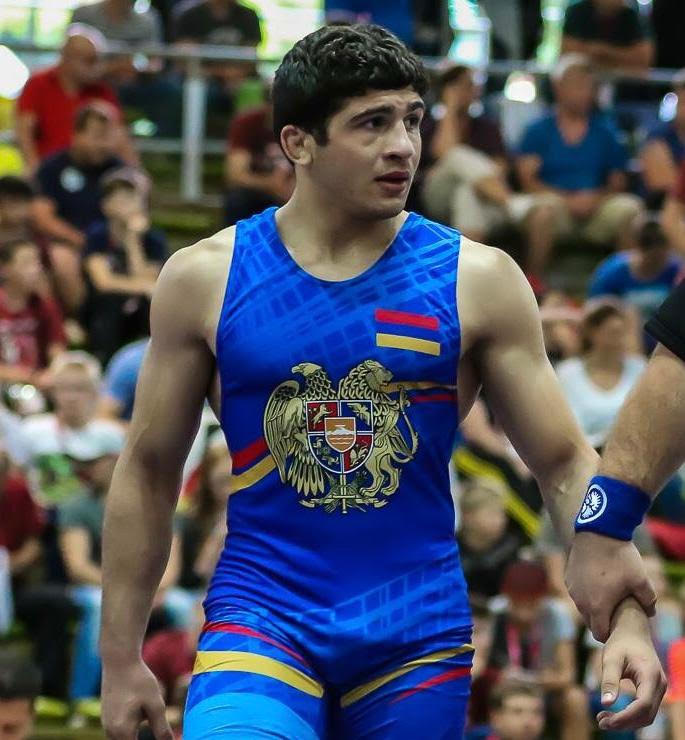
- Amoyan in 2018

Personal information
- Born: 22 January 1999 (age 27) Yerevan, Armenia
- Height: 1.68 m (5 ft 6 in)

Sport
- Country: Armenia
- Sport: Greco-Roman
- Weight class: 72-77 kg
- Event: Greco-Roman
- Club: Dinamo
Medal record
Men's Greco-Roman wrestling
Representing Armenia
Olympic Games
Bronze medal – third place	2024 Paris	77 kg
World Championships
Gold medal – first place	2021 Oslo	72 kg
Gold medal – first place	2025 Zagreb	77 kg
Bronze medal – third place	2022 Belgrade	77 kg
Bronze medal – third place	2023 Belgrade	77 kg
European Championships
Gold medal – first place	2022 Budapest	77 kg
Gold medal – first place	2023 Zagreb	77 kg
Gold medal – first place	2024 Bucharest	77 kg
Gold medal – first place	2025 Bratislava	77 kg
Gold medal – first place	2026 Tirana	77 kg
Silver medal – second place	2021 Warsaw	72 kg
Individual World Cup
Silver medal – second place	2020 Belgrade	72 kg

Malkhas Amoyan (born 22 January 1999) is an Armenian Greco-Roman wrestler. He won the gold medal in the men's 72 kg event at the 2021 World Wrestling Championships held in Oslo, Norway, and earned his second gold medal at the 2025 World Wrestling Championships held in Zagreb, Croatia. He has also won the gold medal in the men's 77 kg event at the European Wrestling Championships consecutively for the years 2022, 2023, 2024, 2025, and 2026.

== Career ==
In 2020, Amoyan won the silver medal in the 72 kg event at the Individual Wrestling World Cup held in Belgrade, Serbia.

Amoyan won the gold medal in the 72 kg event at the 2021 World Wrestling Championships held in Oslo, Norway. In 2021, he also won the silver medal in the 72 kg event at the European Wrestling Championships held in Warsaw, Poland.

Amoyan won the gold medal in the 77 kg event at the 2022 European Wrestling Championships held in Budapest, Hungary. He won one of the bronze medals in the 77 kg event at the 2022 World Wrestling Championships held in Belgrade, Serbia. Amoyan also won one of the bronze medals in the 77 kg event at the 2023 World Wrestling Championships held in Belgrade, Serbia.

He won the gold medal in the 77 kg event at the 2024 European Wrestling Championships held in Bucharest, Romania. In the final, he defeated Yunus Emre Başar of Turkey. He won one of the bronze medals in the 77 kg event at the 2024 Summer Olympics in Paris, France.

== Personal life ==
Malkhas was born in Yerevan, Armenia to Yazidi parents. His uncle Roman Amoyan is a retired competitive wrestler.

== Achievements ==
Year	Tournament	Location	Result	Event
2021	European Championships	Warsaw, Poland	2nd	Greco-Roman 72 kg
2021	World Championships	Oslo, Norway	1st	Greco-Roman 72 kg
2022	European Championships	Budapest, Hungary	1st	Greco-Roman 77 kg
2022	World Championships	Belgrade, Serbia	3rd	Greco-Roman 77 kg
2023	European Championships	Zagreb, Croatia	1st	Greco-Roman 77 kg
2023	World Championships	Belgrade, Serbia	3rd	Greco-Roman 77 kg
2024	European Championships	Bucharest, Romania	1st	Greco-Roman 77 kg
2024	Summer Olympics	Paris, France	3rd	Greco-Roman 77 kg
2025	European Championships	Bratislava, Slovakia	1st	Greco-Roman 77 kg
2025	World Championships	Zagreb, Croatia	1st	Greco-Roman 77 kg
2026	European Championships	Tirana, Albania	1st	Greco-Roman 77 kg
