= Róbert Fritsch =

Hungarian Greco-Roman wrestler

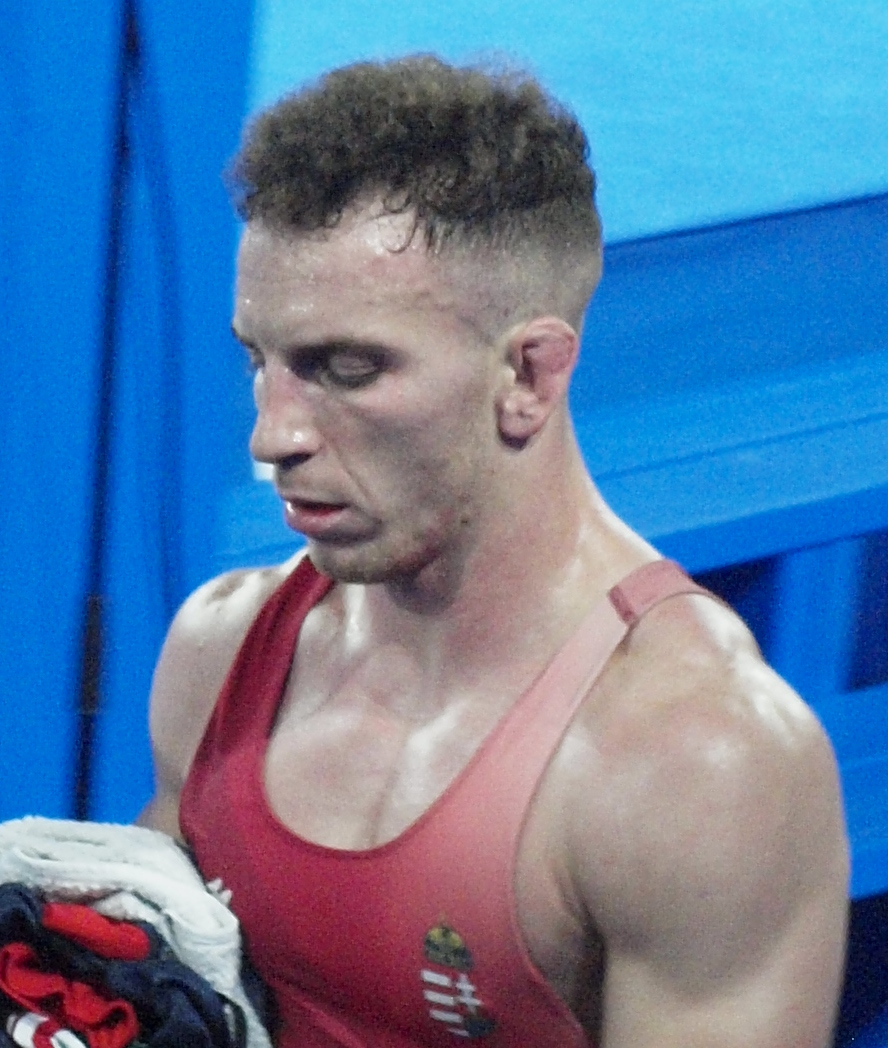
- Fritsch at the 2021 World Wrestling Championships in Oslo, Norway

Sport
- Country: Hungary
- Sport: Amateur wrestling
- Weight class: 72 kg
- Event: Greco-Roman
Medal record
Men's Greco-Roman wrestling
Representing Hungary
World Championships
Silver medal – second place	2023 Belgrade	72 kg
Bronze medal – third place	2025 Zagreb	77 kg
European Championships
Gold medal – first place	2022 Budapest	72 kg
Bronze medal – third place	2021 Warsaw	72 kg
Vehbi Emre & Hamit Kaplan Tournament
Gold medal – first place	2023 Istanbul	72 kg
Dan Kolov - Nikola Petrov Tournament
Silver medal – second place	2022 Veliko Tarnovo	72 kg
Grand Prix
Gold medal – first place	2019 Zagreb	72 kg
Bronze medal – third place	2022 Rome	72 kg
World U23 Championships
Silver medal – second place	2017 Bydgoszcz	71 kg
European U23 Championship
Bronze medal – third place	2017 Szombathely	71 kg
World University Championship
Bronze medal – third place	2018 Goiana	72 kg

Róbert Fritsch is a Hungarian Greco-Roman wrestler. He won the silver medal in the 72 kg event at the 2023 World Wrestling Championships held in Belgrade, Serbia. He won the gold medal in the 72 kg event at the 2022 European Wrestling Championships held in Budapest, Hungary.

== Career ==
In 2021, Fritsch won the gold medal in the 72 kg event at the Matteo Pellicone Ranking Series 2021 held in Rome, Italy.

Fritsch won one of the bronze medals in the 72 kg event at the 2021 European Wrestling Championships held in Warsaw, Poland. He defeated Chingiz Labazanov of Russia in his bronze medal match.

Fritsch won the gold medal in the 72 kg event at the 2022 European Wrestling Championships held in Budapest, Hungary. In 2023, he won the silver medal in the 72 kg event at the World Wrestling Championships held in Belgrade, Serbia.

== Achievements ==
Year	Tournament	Location	Result	Event
2021	European Championships	Warsaw, Poland	3rd	Greco-Roman 72 kg
2022	European Championships	Budapest, Hungary	1st	Greco-Roman 72 kg
2023	World Championships	Belgrade, Serbia	2nd	Greco-Roman 72 kg
2025	World Championships	Zagreb, Croatia	3rd	Greco-Roman 77 kg
