= Sanan Suleymanov =

Azerbaijani Greco-Roman wrestler

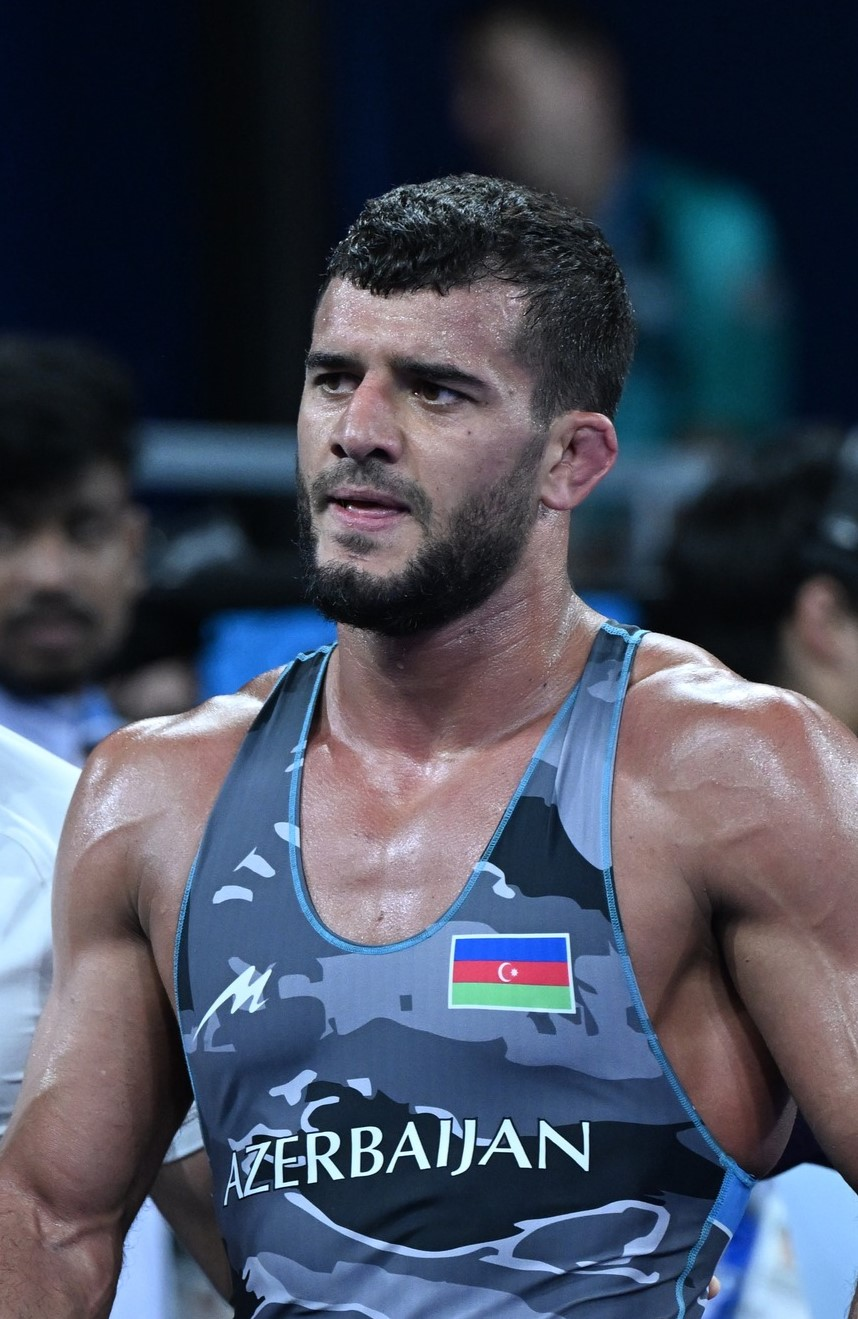
- Suleymanov at the 2024 Summer Olympics

Personal information
- Native name: Sənan Əmrah oğlu Süleymanov
- Born: December 15, 1996 (age 29) Dmanisi, Georgia

Sport
- Country: Azerbaijan
- Sport: Amateur wrestling
- Weight class: 77 kg
- Event: Greco-Roman
Medal record
Men's Greco-Roman wrestling
Representing Azerbaijan
World Championships
Gold medal – first place	2026 Astana	77 kg
Silver medal – second place	2021 Oslo	77 kg
Silver medal – second place	2023 Belgrade	77 kg
European Championships
Gold medal – first place	2020 Rome	77 kg
Bronze medal – third place	2022 Budapest	77 kg
Bronze medal – third place	2021 Warsaw	77 kg
Islamic Solidarity Games
Silver medal – second place	2021 Konya	77 kg
Grand Prix
Gold medal – first place	2023 Budapest	77 kg
World U23 Championships
Silver medal – second place	2019 Budapest	72 kg

Sanan Suleymanov (Azerbaijani: Sənan Süleymanov; born 15 December 1996) is an Azerbaijani Greco-Roman wrestler. He won the silver medal in the 77 kg event at the 2021 World Wrestling Championships held in Oslo, Norway. In 2020, he won the gold medal in the 77 kg event at the European Wrestling Championships held in Rome, Italy.

== Career ==
Suleymanov competed in the 66 kg event at the 2017 European Wrestling Championships held in Novi Sad, Serbia without winning a medal. He won his first match against Parviz Nasibov of Ukraine but he was eliminated from the competition by Atakan Yüksel of Turkey.

In 2019, Suleymanov competed in the 72 kg event at the World Wrestling Championships held in Nur-Sultan, Kazakhstan without winning a medal. At the 2019 World U23 Wrestling Championship held in Budapest, Hungary, he won the silver medal in the 72 kg event. In the final, he lost against Mohammad Reza Geraei of Iran. In 2020, Suleymanov competed in the men's 77 kg event at the Individual Wrestling World Cup held in Belgrade, Serbia.

In March 2021, Suleymanov competed at the European Qualification Tournament in Budapest, Hungary hoping to qualify for the 2020 Summer Olympics in Tokyo, Japan. In April 2021, he won one of the bronze medals in the 77 kg event at the European Wrestling Championships held in Warsaw, Poland.

In 2022, Suleymanov won the silver medal in his event at the Vehbi Emre & Hamit Kaplan Tournament held in Istanbul, Turkey. He won one of the bronze medals in the 77 kg event at the European Wrestling Championships held in Budapest, Hungary. He won the silver medal in his event at the 2021 Islamic Solidarity Games held in Konya, Turkey.

Suleymanov competed in the 77 kg event at the 2022 World Wrestling Championships held in Belgrade, Serbia where he was eliminated in his first match.

He represented Azerbaijan at the 2024 Summer Olympics in Paris, France. He lost his bronze medal match in the 77 kg event at the Olympics.

On October 25, 2026, at the World Championship in Astana, Sanan Suleymanov defeated Alexandrin Guțu of Moldova in the final in the up to 77 kg weight category and won the gold medal.

== Achievements ==
Year	Tournament	Venue	Result	Event
2020	European Championships	Rome, Italy	1st	Greco-Roman 77 kg
2021	European Championships	Warsaw, Poland	3rd	Greco-Roman 77 kg
2021	World Championships	Oslo, Norway	2nd	Greco-Roman 77 kg
2022	European Championships	Budapest, Hungary	3rd	Greco-Roman 77 kg
2022	Islamic Solidarity Games	Konya, Turkey	2nd	Greco-Roman 77 kg
2023	World Championships	Belgrade, Serbia	2nd	Greco-Roman 77 kg
