= Antonio Kamenjašević =

Croatian Greco-Roman wrestler

Aleksandr Komarov
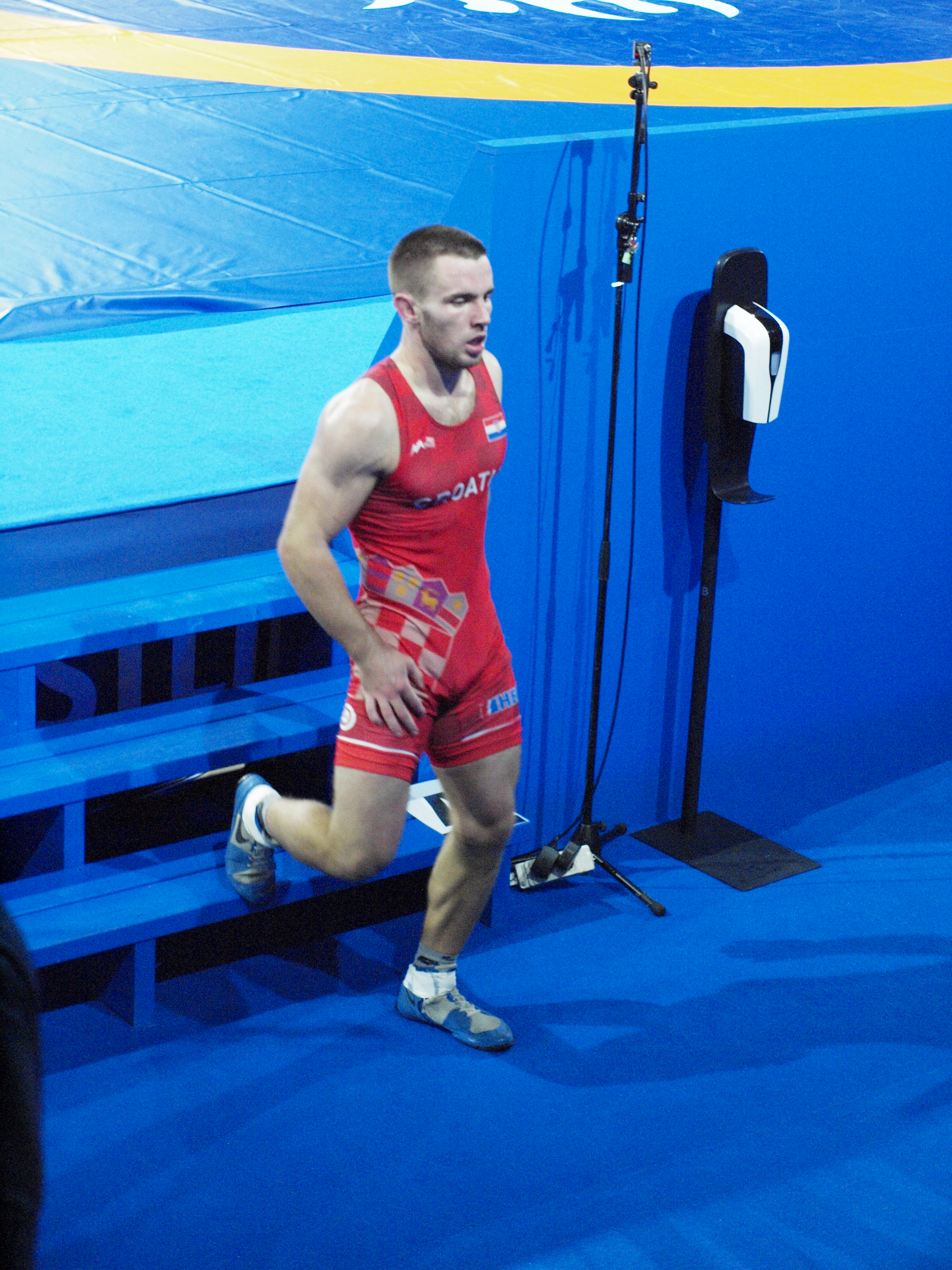

Personal information
- Born: 5 May 1999 (age 27)

Sport
- Sport: Amateur wrestling
- Event: Greco-Roman
Medal record
Men's Greco-Roman wrestling
Representing Croatia
European Championships
Bronze medal – third place	2021 Warsaw	77 kg
Mediterranean Games
Silver medal – second place	2026 Taranto	77 kg

Antonio Kamenjašević (born January 29, 1997, in Zagreb) is a male Greco-Roman wrestler from Croatia. He is a member of HK Herkul.

His best achievement is the bronze medal at the 2021 European Wrestling Championships – Men's Greco-Roman 77 kg in Warsaw, Poland.

== Early life ==
Kamenjašević started wrestling at the age of 9 in wrestling club "Metalac" in Zagreb. He attended elementary school in Klinča Sela and Sport Gymnasium in Zagreb. Currently, he studies at the Faculty of Kinesiology of the University of Zagreb.

== Career ==
In 2016, he won silver medal at the European U-23 Championships in Bulgaria in 71 kg category. Following year, he won silver medal at the same competition in Hungary, but this time in 75 kg category, as well as fifth place in Turkey in 2018 in 77 kg category.

Kamenjašević competed in the 77 kg event at the 2022 World Wrestling Championships held in Belgrade, Serbia. He competed at the 2024 European Wrestling Olympic Qualification Tournament in Baku, Azerbaijan hoping to qualify for the 2024 Summer Olympics in Paris, France. He was eliminated in his second match and he did not qualify for the Olympics. Kamenjašević also competed at the 2024 World Wrestling Olympic Qualification Tournament held in Istanbul, Turkey without qualifying for the Olympics.
