= 2019 World Wrestling Championships – Men's Greco-Roman 77 kg =

Men's Greco-Roman 77 kg at the 2019 World Championships
- Venue: Barys Arena
- Dates: 16–17 September 2019
- Competitors: 38 from 38 nations

Medalists
gold medal	Tamás Lőrincz	Hungary
silver medal	Alex Kessidis	Sweden
bronze medal	Mohammad Ali Geraei	Iran
bronze medal	Jalgasbay Berdimuratov	Uzbekistan

The men's Greco-Roman 77 kilograms is a competition featured at the 2019 World Wrestling Championships, and was held in Nur-Sultan, Kazakhstan on 16 and 17 September.

== Results ==
Legend

- C — Won by 3 cautions given to the opponent
- F — Won by fall

=== Finals ===
Semifinals		Final
Alex Kessidis (SWE)	5
Karapet Chalyan (ARM)	2	Alex Kessidis (SWE)	0
Tamás Lőrincz (HUN)	1	Tamás Lőrincz (HUN)	8
Askhat Dilmukhamedov (KAZ)	1

=== Top half ===
==== Section 1 ====
Round of 64

Round of 32
Kim Hyeon-woo (KOR)	0
Mohammad Ali Geraei (IRI)	8
Elvin Mursaliyev (AZE)	8^{C}
Gela Bolkvadze (GEO)	0
Roman Zhernovetski (ISR)	0
Edgar Babayan (POL)	9
Daniel Cataraga (MDA)	4
Alex Kessidis (SWE)	5

Round of 16
Mohammad Ali Geraei (IRI)	7
Elvin Mursaliyev (AZE)	0
Edgar Babayan (POL)	0
Alex Kessidis (SWE)	4

Quarterfinals
Mohammad Ali Geraei (IRI)	1
Alex Kessidis (SWE)	9

==== Section 2 ====
Round of 64

Round of 32
Karapet Chalyan (ARM)	4
Shohei Yabiku (JPN)	2
Zied Ayet Ikram (MAR)	1
Wuileixis Rivas (VEN)	7^{F}
Fatih Cengiz (TUR)	3
Božo Starčević (CRO)	1
Riccardo Abbrescia (ITA)	3
Pavel Liakh (BLR)	10

Round of 16
Karapet Chalyan (ARM)	9
Wuileixis Rivas (VEN)	0
Fatih Cengiz (TUR)	1
Pavel Liakh (BLR)	9

Quarterfinals
Karapet Chalyan (ARM)	5
Pavel Liakh (BLR)	4

=== Bottom half ===
==== Section 3 ====
Round of 64

Round of 32
Tamás Lőrincz (HUN)	3
Jalgasbay Berdimuratov (UZB)	0
Volodymyr Yakovliev (UKR)	10
Bakhit Sharif Badr (QAT)	0
Roland Schwarz (GER)	5
Pat Smith (USA)	3
Şermet Permanow (TKM)	1
Paulius Galkinas (LTU)	7^{F}

Round of 16
Tamás Lőrincz (HUN)	5
Volodymyr Yakovliev (UKR)	2
Roland Schwarz (GER)	0
Paulius Galkinas (LTU)	10

Quarterfinals
Tamás Lőrincz (HUN)	5
Paulius Galkinas (LTU)	0

==== Section 4 ====
Round of 64
Oldřich Varga (CZE)	12
Rabbia Khalil (PLE)	0
Yang Bin (CHN)	0
Roman Vlasov (RUS)	8
Daniel Aleksandrov (BUL)	6
Jair Cuero (COL)	3
Evrik Nikoghosyan (FRA)	2
Abdelkrim Ouakali (ALG)	0
Niko Erkkola (FIN)	0
Kairatbek Tugolbaev (KGZ)	7
Michael Wagner (AUT)	0
Gurpreet Singh (IND)	6^{F}

Round of 32
Askhat Dilmukhamedov (KAZ)	9
Oldřich Varga (CZE)	0
Roman Vlasov (RUS)	11
Daniel Aleksandrov (BUL)	0
Evrik Nikoghosyan (FRA)	3
Kairatbek Tugolbaev (KGZ)	1
Gurpreet Singh (IND)	1
Viktor Nemeš (SRB)	3

Round of 16
Askhat Dilmukhamedov (KAZ)	3
Roman Vlasov (RUS)	0
Evrik Nikoghosyan (FRA)	1
Viktor Nemeš (SRB)	4

Quarterfinals
Askhat Dilmukhamedov (KAZ)	4
Viktor Nemeš (SRB)	3

=== Repechage ===
Repechage round 2
Daniel Cataraga (MDA)	8
Edgar Babayan (POL)	0
Jalgasbay Berdimuratov (UZB)	3
Volodymyr Yakovliev (UKR)	3

Repechage round 3
Daniel Cataraga (MDA)	5
Mohammad Ali Geraei (IRI)	5
Jalgasbay Berdimuratov (UZB)	9
Paulius Galkinas (LTU)	0

Bronze medals
Mohammad Ali Geraei (IRI)	9
Karapet Chalyan (ARM)	6
Jalgasbay Berdimuratov (UZB)	3
Askhat Dilmukhamedov (KAZ)	1
