= 2017 World Wrestling Championships – Men's Greco-Roman 75 kg =

Men's Greco-Roman 75 kg at the 2017 World Championships
- Venue: AccorHotels Arena
- Dates: 21 August 2017
- Competitors: 34 from 34 nations

Medalists
gold medal	Viktor Nemeš	Serbia
silver medal	Tamás Lőrincz	Hungary
bronze medal	Fatih Cengiz	Turkey
bronze medal	Saeid Abdevali	Iran

The men's Greco-Roman 75 kilograms is a competition featured at the 2017 World Wrestling Championships, and was held in Paris, France on 21 August 2017.

== Results ==
Legend

- F — Won by fall

=== Finals ===
Semifinals		Final
Tamás Lőrincz (HUN)	2
Aleksandr Chekhirkin (RUS)	3^{F}	Aleksandr Chekhirkin (RUS)	1
Viktor Nemeš (SRB)	7	Viktor Nemeš (SRB)	4
Kazbek Kilou (BLR)	0

=== Top half ===
==== Section 1 ====
Round of 64

Round of 32
Kim Hyeon-woo (KOR)	5^{F}
Ângelo Moreira (BRA)	0
Hasan Aliyev (AZE)	0
Shohei Yabiku (JPN)	4
Rabbia Khalil (PLE)	0
Tamás Lőrincz (HUN)	9
Kairatbek Tugolbaev (KGZ)	8
Ahmed Ibrahim Gomaa (EGY)	0

Round of 16
Kim Hyeon-woo (KOR)	3
Shohei Yabiku (JPN)	2
Tamás Lőrincz (HUN)	2
Kairatbek Tugolbaev (KGZ)	0

Quarterfinals
Kim Hyeon-woo (KOR)	1
Tamás Lőrincz (HUN)	3

==== Section 2 ====
Round of 64

Round of 32
Fatih Cengiz (TUR)	5
Aleksandr Chekhirkin (RUS)	8
Oldřich Varga (CZE)	5
Paulius Galkinas (LTU)	1
Damian Dietsche (SUI)	1
Dawid Klimek (POL)	7
Khalid Sahli (MAR)	1
Zhang Gang (CHN)	3

Round of 16
Aleksandr Chekhirkin (RUS)	3^{F}
Oldřich Varga (CZE)	1
Dawid Klimek (POL)	6
Zhang Gang (CHN)	13

Quarterfinals
Aleksandr Chekhirkin (RUS)	5^{F}
Zhang Gang (CHN)	0

=== Bottom half ===
==== Section 3 ====
Round of 64

Round of 32
Saeid Abdevali (IRI)	1
Viktor Nemeš (SRB)	2
George Mariea (ROU)	0
Maxat Yerezhepov (KAZ)	4
Yurisandy Hernández (CUB)	0
Karapet Chalyan (ARM)	9
Yevhen Pyshkov (UKR)	1
Florian Neumaier (GER)	2

Round of 16
Viktor Nemeš (SRB)	3
Maxat Yerezhepov (KAZ)	1
Karapet Chalyan (ARM)	3
Florian Neumaier (GER)	1

Quarterfinals
Viktor Nemeš (SRB)	2
Karapet Chalyan (ARM)	1

==== Section 4 ====
Round of 64
Mason Manville (USA)	4
Manfred Edsberg (SWE)	2
Mindia Tsulukidze (GEO)	5
Gurpreet Singh (IND)	1

Round of 32
Georgios Prevolarakis (GRE)	0
Rajbek Bisultanov (DEN)	8
Francisco Barrio (ARG)	0
Kazbek Kilou (BLR)	8
Sami Slama (FRA)	6
Tero Halmesmäki (FIN)	3
Mason Manville (USA)	2
Mindia Tsulukidze (GEO)	4

Round of 16
Rajbek Bisultanov (DEN)	3
Kazbek Kilou (BLR)	5
Sami Slama (FRA)	3
Mindia Tsulukidze (GEO)	10

Quarterfinals
Kazbek Kilou (BLR)	9
Mindia Tsulukidze (GEO)	2

=== Repechage ===
Repechage round 2
Fatih Cengiz (TUR)	2
Oldřich Varga (CZE)	1
Saeid Abdevali (IRI)	4
Maxat Yerezhepov (KAZ)	0

Repechage round 3
Fatih Cengiz (TUR)	3
Zhang Gang (CHN)	3
Saeid Abdevali (IRI)	3
Karapet Chalyan (ARM)	0

Bronze medals
Fatih Cengiz (TUR)	1
Tamás Lőrincz (HUN)	2
Saeid Abdevali (IRI)	8
Kazbek Kilou (BLR)	0

- Aleksandr Chekhirkin of Russia originally won the silver medal, but was disqualified after he tested positive for doping. Tamás Lőrincz was upgraded to the silver medal and Fatih Cengiz was raised to third and took the bronze medal.
