= 2018 World Wrestling Championships – Men's Greco-Roman 77 kg =

Wrestling competition

Men's Greco-Roman 77 kg at the 2018 World Championships
- Venue: László Papp Budapest Sports Arena
- Dates: 27–28 October 2018
- Competitors: 37 from 37 nations

Medalists
gold medal	Aleksandr Chekhirkin	Russia
silver medal	Tamás Lőrincz	Hungary
bronze medal	Kim Hyeon-woo	South Korea
bronze medal	Viktor Nemeš	Serbia

The men's Greco-Roman 77 kilograms is a competition featured at the 2018 World Wrestling Championships, and was held in Budapest, Hungary on 27 and 28 October.

== Results ==
Legend

- F — Won by fall

=== Finals ===
Semifinals		Final
Kim Hyeon-woo (KOR)	1
Tamás Lőrincz (HUN)	3	Tamás Lőrincz (HUN)	1
Alex Kessidis (SWE)	0	Aleksandr Chekhirkin (RUS)	3
Aleksandr Chekhirkin (RUS)	11

=== Top half ===
==== Section 1 ====
Round of 64

Round of 32
Kazbek Kilou (BLR)	1
Tornike Dzamashvili (GEO)	7
Tamerlan Shadukayev (KAZ)	4
Fatih Cengiz (TUR)	5
Božo Starčević (CRO)	8^{F}
Pascal Eisele (GER)	7
Karapet Chalyan (ARM)	0
Kim Hyeon-woo (KOR)	4

Round of 16
Tornike Dzamashvili (GEO)	4
Fatih Cengiz (TUR)	7
Božo Starčević (CRO)	0
Kim Hyeon-woo (KOR)	9

Quarterfinals
Fatih Cengiz (TUR)	0
Kim Hyeon-woo (KOR)	8

==== Section 2 ====
Round of 64

Round of 32
Paulius Galkinas (LTU)	4
Jair Cuero (COL)	3
George Mariea (ROU)	0
Tamás Lőrincz (HUN)	8
Ângelo Moreira (BRA)	8
Rajbek Bisultanov (DEN)	8
Georgios Prevolarakis (GRE)	0
Bilan Nalgiev (UZB)	9

Round of 16
Paulius Galkinas (LTU)	0
Tamás Lőrincz (HUN)	8
Ângelo Moreira (BRA)	0
Bilan Nalgiev (UZB)	9

Quarterfinals
Tamás Lőrincz (HUN)	3
Bilan Nalgiev (UZB)	0

=== Bottom half ===
==== Section 3 ====
Round of 64

Round of 32
Shohei Yabiku (JPN)	10
Oldřich Varga (CZE)	0
Alex Kessidis (SWE)	8
Matias Lipasti (FIN)	1
Dmytro Pyshkov (UKR)	4
Pejman Poshtam (IRI)	3
Igor Beşleaga (MDA)	9
Rabbia Khalil (PLE)	0

Round of 16
Shohei Yabiku (JPN)	4
Alex Kessidis (SWE)	7
Dmytro Pyshkov (UKR)	0
Igor Beşleaga (MDA)	2

Quarterfinals
Alex Kessidis (SWE)	4
Igor Beşleaga (MDA)	4

==== Section 4 ====
Round of 64
Reinier Jiménez (GUA)	8
Şermet Permanow (TKM)	0
Kamal Bey (USA)	9
Zhang Ridong (CHN)	0
Gurpreet Singh (IND)	0
Kairatbek Tugolbaev (KGZ)	9
Aleksandr Chekhirkin (RUS)	11
Igor Petrishin (ISR)	0
Sultan Ali Eid (JOR)	0
Viktor Nemeš (SRB)	9

Round of 32
Iwan Nylypiuk (POL)	0
Elvin Mursaliyev (AZE)	9
Reinier Jiménez (GUA)	1
Kamal Bey (USA)	8
Kairatbek Tugolbaev (KGZ)	0
Aleksandr Chekhirkin (RUS)	5
Viktor Nemeš (SRB)	4
Ariel Fis (CUB)	1

Round of 16
Elvin Mursaliyev (AZE)	6
Kamal Bey (USA)	2
Aleksandr Chekhirkin (RUS)	2
Viktor Nemeš (SRB)	1

Quarterfinals
Elvin Mursaliyev (AZE)	0
Aleksandr Chekhirkin (RUS)	3

=== Repechage ===
Repechage round 1
Igor Petrisnin (ISR)	0
Kairatbek Tugolbaev (KGZ)	5

Repechage round 2
George Mariea (ROU)	2
Paulius Galkinas (LTU)	1
Kairatbek Tugolbaev (KGZ)	2
Viktor Nemeš (SRB)	9

Repechage round 3
George Mariea (ROU)	1
Bilan Nalgiev (UZB)	2^{F}
Viktor Nemeš (SRB)	5
Elvin Mursaliyev (AZE)	1

Bronze medals
Bilan Nalgiev (UZB)	1
Kim Hyeon-woo (KOR)	3
Viktor Nemeš (SRB)	6
Alex Kessidis (SWE)	2
