= 2020 European Wrestling Championships – Men's Greco-Roman 77 kg =

Wrestling competition

The men's Greco-Roman 77 kg is a competition featured at the 2020 European Wrestling Championships, and was held in Rome, Italy on February 10 and February 11.

== Medalists ==
Gold	Sanan Suleymanov; Azerbaijan
Silver	Zoltán Lévai; Hungary
Bronze	Alex Kessidis; Sweden
Bronze	Karapet Chalyan; Armenia

== Results ==
Legend

- F — Won by fall
- R — Retired

=== Final ===
Final
Zoltán Lévai (HUN)	1
Sanan Suleymanov (AZE)	3

=== Top half ===
Round of 32
Zoltán Lévai (HUN)	4
Alex Kessidis (SWE)	0
Pavel Puklavec (CRO)	6
Edgar Babayan (POL)	14
Islam Opiev (RUS)	3
Demuri Kavtaradze (GEO)	1

Round of 16
Oldřich Varga (CZE)	0
Evrik Nikoghosyan (FRA)	11
Volodymyr Yakovliev (UKR)	4
Marcel Sterkenburg (NED)	0
Denis Horváth (SVK)	0
Zoltán Lévai (HUN)	9
Edgar Babayan (POL)	2
Islam Opiev (RUS)	3

Quarterfinals
Evrik Nikoghosyan (FRA)	4
Volodymyr Yakovliev (UKR)	11
Zoltán Lévai (HUN)	8
Islam Opiev (RUS)	1

Semifinals
Volodymyr Yakovliev (UKR)	0
Zoltán Lévai (HUN)	7

=== Bottom half ===
Round of 32
Karapet Chalyan (ARM)	11
Nicolas Christen (SUI)	2
Viktor Nemeš (SRB)	2
Pascal Eisele (GER)	1
Daniel Cataraga (MDA)	2
Yunus Emre Başar (TUR)	2
Ranet Kaljola (EST)	0
Pavel Liakh (BLR)	7
Matteo Maffezzoli (ITA)	3
Roman Zhernovetski (ISR)	1
Aik Mnatsakanian (BUL)	3
Sanan Suleymanov (AZE)	5
Paulius Galkinas (LTU)	1
Georgios Prevolarakis (GRE)	5
Tero Halmesmäki (FIN)	4
Per-Anders Kure (NOR)	0

Round of 16
Karapet Chalyan (ARM)	3
Viktor Nemeš (SRB)	1
Yunus Emre Başar (TUR)	5
Pavel Liakh (BLR)	12
Matteo Maffezzoli (ITA)	0
Sanan Suleymanov (AZE)	7
Georgios Prevolarakis (GRE)	7
Tero Halmesmäki (FIN)	3

Quarterfinals
Karapet Chalyan (ARM)	4
Pavel Liakh (BLR)	0
Sanan Suleymanov (AZE)	8^{F}
Georgios Prevolarakis (GRE)	4

Semifinals
Karapet Chalyan (ARM)	0
Sanan Suleymanov (AZE)	3

=== Repechage ===
Repechage round 1
Alex Kessidis (SWE)	9
Denis Horváth (SVK)	0
Aik Mnatsakanian (BUL)	5
Matteo Maffezzoli (ITA)	1

Repechage round 2
Alex Kessidis (SWE)	2
Islam Opiev (RUS)	2
Aik Mnatsakanian (BUL)	4
Georgios Prevolarakis (GRE)	1

Bronze medal match
Alex Kessidis (SWE)	5
Volodymyr Yakovliev (UKR)	2
Aik Mnatsakanian (BUL)	0^{R}
Karapet Chalyan (ARM)	3

== Final standing ==
Rank	Athlete
1st place, gold medalist(s)	Sanan Suleymanov (AZE)
2nd place, silver medalist(s)	Zoltán Lévai (HUN)
3rd place, bronze medalist(s)	Alex Kessidis (SWE)
3rd place, bronze medalist(s)	Karapet Chalyan (ARM)
5	Volodymyr Yakovliev (UKR)
5	Aik Mnatsakanian (BUL)
7	Islam Opiev (RUS)
8	Pavel Liakh (BLR)
9	Georgios Prevolarakis (GRE)
10	Edgar Babayan (POL)
11	Evrik Nikoghosyan (FRA)
12	Tero Halmesmäki (FIN)
13	Yunus Emre Başar (TUR)
14	Matteo Maffezzoli (ITA)
15	Viktor Nemeš (SRB)
16	Pavel Puklavec (CRO)
17	Daniel Cataraga (MDA)
18	Nicolas Christen (SUI)
19	Pascal Eisele (GER)
20	Demuri Kavtaradze (GEO)
21	Roman Zhernovetski (ISR)
22	Paulius Galkinas (LTU)
23	Marcel Sterkenburg (NED)
24	Per-Anders Kure (NOR)
25	Ranet Kaljola (EST)
26	Oldřich Varga (CZE)
27	Denis Horváth (SVK)
