= 2021 World Wrestling Championships – Men's Greco-Roman 77 kg =

Wrestling competitions

Men's Greco-Roman 77 kg at the 2021 World Championships
- Venue: Nye Jordal Amfi
- Dates: 7–8 October 2021
- Competitors: 31 from 31 nations

Medalists
gold medal	Roman Vlasov	RWF
silver medal	Sanan Suleymanov	Azerbaijan
bronze medal	Roland Schwarz	Germany
bronze medal	Mohammad Ali Geraei	Iran

The men's Greco-Roman 77 kilograms is a competition featured at the 2021 World Wrestling Championships, and was held in Oslo, Norway on 7 and 8 October.

This Greco-Roman wrestling competition consists of a single-elimination tournament, with a repechage used to determine the winner of two bronze medals. The two finalists face off for gold and silver medals. Each wrestler who loses to one of the two finalists moves into the repechage, culminating in a pair of bronze medal matches featuring the semifinal losers each facing the remaining repechage opponent from their half of the bracket.

== Results ==
Legend

- F — Won by fall

=== Final ===
Final
Sanan Suleymanov (AZE)	1
Roman Vlasov (RWF)	2

=== Top half ===
Round of 32
Tsimur Berdyieu (BLR)	7
Patryk Bednarz (POL)	1
Bogdan Kourinnoi (SWE)	3
Jesse Porter (USA)	1
Matias Lipasti (FIN)	0
Kodai Sakuraba (JPN)	9
Alexandrin Guțu (MDA)	7
Emmanuel Benítez (MEX)	4
Roland Schwarz (GER)	5
Noh Yeong-hun (KOR)	4
Sanan Suleymanov (AZE)	9
Kairatbek Tugolbaev (KGZ)	0
Mathayo Mahabila (KEN)	0
Daler Rezazade (TJK)	8

Round of 16
Yunus Emre Başar (TUR)	2
Tsimur Berdyieu (BLR)	3
Bogdan Kourinnoi (SWE)	6
Kodai Sakuraba (JPN)	7
Alexandrin Guțu (MDA)	1
Roland Schwarz (GER)	7
Sanan Suleymanov (AZE)	9
Daler Rezazade (TJK)	0

Quarterfinals
Tsimur Berdyieu (BLR)	15
Kodai Sakuraba (JPN)	3
Roland Schwarz (GER)	2
Sanan Suleymanov (AZE)	10

Semifinals
Tsimur Berdyieu (BLR)	4
Sanan Suleymanov (AZE)	5

=== Bottom half ===
Round of 32
Antonio Kamenjašević (CRO)	5
Tamás Lévai (HUN)	5
Sajan Bhanwal (IND)	11
Exauce Mukubu (NOR)	6
Viktor Nemeš (SRB)	8
Boris Frrokaj (ALB)	0
Oliver Krüger (DEN)	9
Rabbia Khalil (PLE)	0
Bakhit Sharif Badr (QAT)	0
Dmytro Pyshkov (UKR)	8
Roman Vlasov (RWF)	11
Tamerlan Shadukayev (KAZ)	0
Joílson Júnior (BRA)	0
Gela Bolkvadze (GEO)	5
Aik Mnatsakanian (BUL)	1
Mohammad Ali Geraei (IRI)	6

Round of 16
Tamás Lévai (HUN)	7^{F}
Sajan Bhanwal (IND)	0
Viktor Nemeš (SRB)	8
Oliver Krüger (DEN)	0
Dmytro Pyshkov (UKR)	3
Roman Vlasov (RWF)	10
Gela Bolkvadze (GEO)	1
Mohammad Ali Geraei (IRI)	6

Quarterfinals
Tamás Lévai (HUN)	1
Viktor Nemeš (SRB)	1
Roman Vlasov (RWF)	10
Mohammad Ali Geraei (IRI)	1

Semifinals
Tamás Lévai (HUN)	0
Roman Vlasov (RWF)	7

=== Repechage ===
Repechage round 1
Kairatbek Tugolbaev (KGZ)	5
Daler Rezazade (TJK)	1
Tamerlan Shadukayev (KAZ)	7
Dmytro Pyshkov (UKR)	0

Repechage round 2
Kairatbek Tugolbaev (KGZ)	1
Roland Schwarz (GER)	2^{F}
Tamerlan Shadukayev (KAZ)	0
Mohammad Ali Geraei (IRI)	9

Bronze medals
Roland Schwarz (GER)	10
Tsimur Berdyieu (BLR)	5
Mohammad Ali Geraei (IRI)	9
Tamás Lévai (HUN)	0

== Final standing ==
Rank	Athlete
1st place, gold medalist(s)	Roman Vlasov (RWF)
2nd place, silver medalist(s)	Sanan Suleymanov (AZE)
3rd place, bronze medalist(s)	Roland Schwarz (GER)
3rd place, bronze medalist(s)	Mohammad Ali Geraei (IRI)
5	Tsimur Berdyieu (BLR)
5	Tamás Lévai (HUN)
7	Viktor Nemeš (SRB)
8	Kodai Sakuraba (JPN)
9	Dmytro Pyshkov (UKR)
10	Daler Rezazade (TJK)
11	Oliver Krüger (DEN)
12	Bogdan Kourinnoi (SWE)
13	Alexandrin Guțu (MDA)
14	Gela Bolkvadze (GEO)
15	Sajan Bhanwal (IND)
16	Tamerlan Shadukayev (KAZ)
17	Kairatbek Tugolbaev (KGZ)
18	Exauce Mukubu (NOR)
19	Antonio Kamenjašević (CRO)
20	Noh Yeong-hun (KOR)
21	Emmanuel Benítez (MEX)
22	Yunus Emre Başar (TUR)
23	Jesse Porter (USA)
24	Aik Mnatsakanian (BUL)
25	Patryk Bednarz (POL)
26	Joílson Júnior (BRA)
27	Mathayo Mahabila (KEN)
28	Boris Frrokaj (ALB)
29	Bakhit Sharif Badr (QAT)
30	Matias Lipasti (FIN)
31	Rabbia Khalil (PLE)
