= World University Wrestling Championships =

The World University Wrestling Championships, an international competition in Wrestling, have been held in alternate years since 1968 each time in a different host city.

== Editions ==
Number	Year	Host city	N° of Countries
1	1968	Istanbul, Turkey	7
2	1996	Tehran, Iran	18
3	1998	Ankara, Turkey	16
4	2000	Tokyo, Japan	23
5	2002	Edmonton, Canada	27
6	2004	Łódź, Poland	26
7	2005	İzmir, Turkey	
8	2006	Ulaanbaatar, Mongolia	30
9	2008	Thessaloniki, Greece	27
10	2010	Turin, Italy	32
11	2012	Kuortane, Finland	24
12	2014	Pécs, Hungary	27
13	2016	Çorum, Turkey	24
14	2018	Goiânia, Brazil	12

== Champions ==
=== Men's freestyle ===
Year	Host city	55 kg	60 kg	66 kg	74 kg	84 kg	96 kg	120 kg	Team
2012	Kuortane, Finland	(Russia) Khuresh; Donduk-Ool	(Ukraine) Vasyl; Shuptar	(Turkey) Mustaf; Kaya	(Iran) Reza; Afzali	(Iran) Meisam; Mostafa-Jokar	No Medal	(Turkey) Taha; Akgül	

Year	Host city	57 kg	61 kg	65 kg	70 kg	74 kg	79 kg	86 kg	92 kg	97 kg	125 kg	Team
2014	Pécs, Hungary	(Japan) Fumitaka; Morishita	(Mongolia) Tuvshintulga; Tumenbileg	(Turkey) Selahattin; Kilicsallayan	(Moldova) Evgheni; Nedealco	(United States) Tyler; Caldwell	No Participant	(Moldova) Piotr; Ianulov	No Participant	(Turkey) Fatih; Yasarli	(United States) Tyrell; Fortune	United States
2016	Çorum, Turkey	(Iran) Younes; Sarmasti	(Russia) Viktor; Rassadin	(Kazakhstan) Meirzhan; Ashirov	(Russia) Nadirbeg; Khizriev	(Iran) Reza; Afzali	No Participant	(Iran) Mohammad; Javad Ebrahimi	No Participant	(Iran) Amir; Mohammadi	(Iran) Seyyed Reza; Mousavi Kani	Iran
2018	Goiânia, Brazil	(Japan) Yudai; Fujita	(Russia) Eduard; Grigorev	(Japan) Kei; Yonezawa	(Japan) Kirin; Kinoshita	(Turkey) Muhammet; Akdeniz	(Russia) Tazhitin; Akaev	(Turkey) Osman; Göçen	(Turkey) Mustafa; Sessiz	(Russia) Asadula; Ibragimov	(Hungary) Balint; Borsos	Japan

=== Men's Greco-Roman ===
Year	Host city	55 kg	60 kg	66 kg	74 kg	84 kg	96 kg	120 kg	Team
2012	Kuortane, Finland	(United States) Max; Nowry	(Moldova) Donior; Islamov	(Hungary) Istvan; Kozak	(Iran) Hadi; Alizadeh	(Iran) Taleb; Nematpour	(Russia) Nikita; Melnikov	(Iran) Bashir; Babajanzadeh	

Year	Host city	59 kg	66 kg	71 kg	75 kg	80 kg	86 kg	98 kg	130 kg	Team
2014	Pécs, Hungary	(Kyrgyzstan) Kanybek; Zholchubekov	(Hungary) Jäger; Krisztián	(Hungary) Tamás; Lőrincz	(Hungary) László; Szabó	(Turkey) Aslan; Atem	(Turkey) Metehan; Başar	(Hungary) Ivan; Nemeth	(Hungary) Bálint; Lám	Hungary
2016	Çorum, Turkey	(Kyrgyzstan) Kanybek; Zholchubekov	No; Participant	(Belarus) Pavel; Liakh	No; Participant	(Hungary) Peter; Nagy	No; Participant	(Turkey) Fatih; Baskoy	No; Participant	Turkey

Year	Host city	55 kg	60 kg	63 kg	67 kg	72 kg	77 kg	82 kg	87 kg	97 kg	130 kg	Team
2018	Goiânia, Brazil	(Turkey) Ekrem; Öztürk	(Russia) Rodoslav; Vasilev	(Japan) Yusuke; Kitaoka	(Russia) Arten; Manasov	(Turkey) Murat; Dag	(Russia) Fatih; Cengiz	(Turkey) Burhan; Akbudak	(Turkey) Ali; Cengiz	(Turkey) Fatih; Baskoy	(Turkey) Osman; Yildirim	Turkey

=== Women's freestyle ===
Year	Host city	55 kg	59 kg	63 kg	67 kg	72 kg	Team
2012	Kuortane, Finland	(Ukraine) Iryna; Husyak	(Japan) Yurika; Ito	(Ukraine) Yuliya; Ostapchuk	(Russia) Yulia; Prontsevich	(United States) Adeline; Gray	

Year	Host city	48 kg	53 kg	55 kg	58 kg	60 kg	63 kg	69 kg	75 kg	Team
2014	Pécs, Hungary	(Canada) Jasmine; Mian	(Moldova) Iulia; Leorda	(Japan) Chiho; Hamada	(Hungary) Emese; Barka	(Russia) Mariia; Liulkova	(Canada) Danielle; Lappage	(Canada) Dorothy; Yeats	(Canada) Erica; Wiebe	Canada
2016	Çorum, Turkey	Allyssa Cleaves Canada	(Russia) Milana; Dadasheva	(Turkey) Bediha; Gün	(Russia) Veronika; Chumikova	(Canada) Linda; Morais	(Russia) Anzhela; Fomenko	(Turkey) Buse; Tosun	(Canada) Justina; Di Stasio	Canada

Year	Host city	50 kg	53 kg	55 kg	57 kg	59 kg	62 kg	65 kg	68 kg	72 kg	76 kg	Team
2018	Goiânia, Brazil	(Canada) Jade; Dufour	(Japan) Miho; Igarashi	(Germany) Elena; Brugger	(Hungary) Ramóna; Galambos	(Canada) Laurence; Beauregard	(Canada) Linda; Morais	(Japan) Misuzu; Enomoto	(Canada) Indira; Moores	(Japan) Mei; Shindo	(Germany) Francy; Rädelt	Canada
