= Wrestling at the 2020 Summer Olympics – Men's Greco-Roman 77 kg =

Men's Greco-Roman 77 kg at the Games of the XXXII Olympiad
- Venue: Makuhari Messe
- Date: 2–3 August 2021
- Competitors: 16 from 16 nations

Medalists
1st place, gold medalist(s)		Tamás Lőrincz	Hungary
2nd place, silver medalist(s)		Akzhol Makhmudov	Kyrgyzstan
3rd place, bronze medalist(s)		Shohei Yabiku	Japan
3rd place, bronze medalist(s)		Rafig Huseynov	Azerbaijan

The men's Greco-Roman 77 kilograms competition at the 2020 Summer Olympics in Tokyo, Japan, took place on 2–3 August 2021 at the Makuhari Messe in Mihama-ku.

This freestyle wrestling competition consists of a single-elimination tournament, with a repechage used to determine the winner of two bronze medals. The two finalists face off for gold and silver medals. Each wrestler who loses to one of the two finalists moves into the repechage, culminating in a pair of bronze medal matches featuring the semifinal losers each facing the remaining repechage opponent from their half of the bracket.

== Schedule ==
All times are Japan Standard Time (UTC+09:00)

Date	Time	Event
2 August 2021	11:00	Qualification rounds
2 August 2021	18:15	Semifinals
3 August 2021	11:00	Repechage
3 August 2021	19:30	Finals

== Results ==
Legend

- WO — Won by walkover

=== Main bracket ===
1/8 finals
Tamás Lőrincz (HUN)	WO
Zied Ayet Ikram (MAR)
Demeu Zhadrayev (KAZ)	3
Shohei Yabiku (JPN)	5
Aik Mnatsakanian (BUL)	1
Božo Starčević (CRO)	3
Yosvanys Peña (CUB)	3
Mohammad Ali Geraei (IRI)	7
Karapet Chalyan (ARM)	5
Jalgasbay Berdimuratov (UZB)	0
Alfonso Leyva (MEX)	0
Aleksandr Chekhirkin (ROC)	7
Lamjed Maafi (TUN)	0
Akzhol Makhmudov (KGZ)	11
Rafig Huseynov (AZE)	1
Alex Kessidis (SWE)	1

1/4 finals
Tamás Lőrincz (HUN)	3
Shohei Yabiku (JPN)	1
Božo Starčević (CRO)	5
Mohammad Ali Geraei (IRI)	5
Karapet Chalyan (ARM)	2
Aleksandr Chekhirkin (ROC)	1
Akzhol Makhmudov (KGZ)	9
Rafig Huseynov (AZE)	1

Semifinals
Tamás Lőrincz (HUN)	6
Mohammad Ali Geraei (IRI)	5
Karapet Chalyan (ARM)	2
Akzhol Makhmudov (KGZ)	6

Final
Tamás Lőrincz (HUN)	2
Akzhol Makhmudov (KGZ)	1

=== Repechage ===
Repechage
Zied Ayet Ikram (MAR)
Shohei Yabiku (JPN)	WO
Lamjed Maafi (TUN)	1
Rafig Huseynov (AZE)	11

Bronze medal matches
Shohei Yabiku (JPN)	13
Mohammad Ali Geraei (IRI)	3
Rafig Huseynov (AZE)	4
Karapet Chalyan (ARM)	1

== Final standing ==
Rank	Athlete
1st place, gold medalist(s)	Tamás Lőrincz (HUN)
2nd place, silver medalist(s)	Akzhol Makhmudov (KGZ)
3rd place, bronze medalist(s)	Shohei Yabiku (JPN)
3rd place, bronze medalist(s)	Rafig Huseynov (AZE)
5	Mohammad Ali Geraei (IRI)
5	Karapet Chalyan (ARM)
7	Aleksandr Chekhirkin (ROC)
8	Božo Starčević (CRO)
9	Demeu Zhadrayev (KAZ)
10	Yosvanys Peña (CUB)
11	Alex Kessidis (SWE)
12	Aik Mnatsakanian (BUL)
13	Lamjed Maafi (TUN)
14	Jalgasbay Berdimuratov (UZB)
15	Alfonso Leyva (MEX)
—	Zied Ayet Ikram (MAR)
