= Zurabi Gedekhauri =

Russian Greco-Roman wrestler

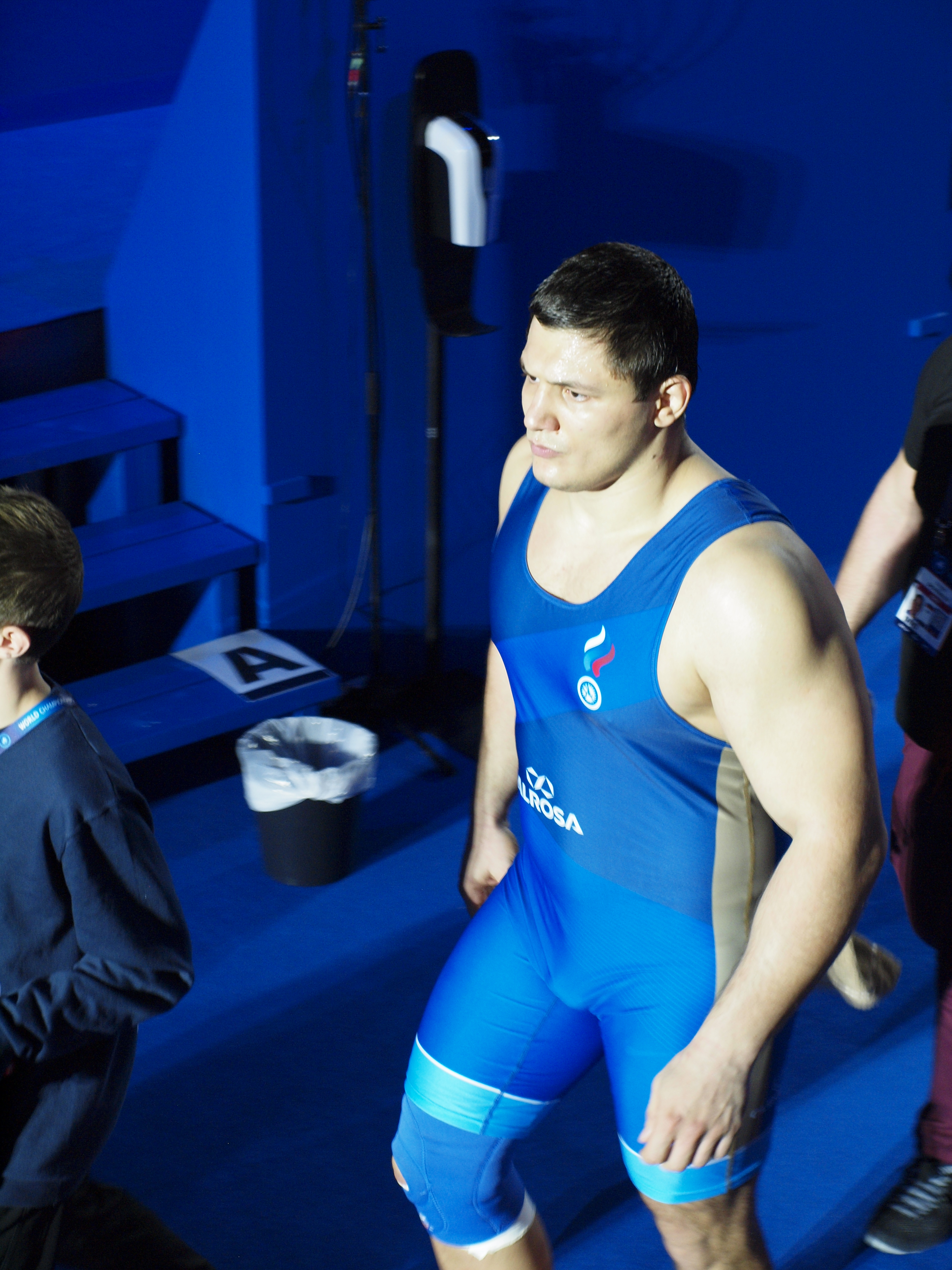

Personal information
- Born: 30 July 1994 (age 31) Tbilisi, Georgia

Sport
- Country: Russia
- Sport: Amateur wrestling
- Weight class: 130 kg
- Event: Greco-Roman
Medal record
Men's Greco-Roman wrestling
Representing Russian Wrestling Federation
World Championships
Silver medal – second place	2021 Oslo	130 kg
Representing Russia
European Championships
Bronze medal – third place	2021 Warsaw	130 kg
World Cup
Silver medal – second place	2016 Tehran	130 kg
World University Wrestling Championships
Silver medal – second place	2018 Goiânia	130 kg

Zurabi Guramovich Gedekhauri (Russian: Зураби Гурамович Гедехаури; born 30 July 1994) is a Georgian-born Russian Greco-Roman wrestler. He won a bronze medal in the 130 kg event at the 2021 European Wrestling Championships. He also won a silver medal at the 2016 Wrestling World Cup and 2018 World University Wrestling Championships. In addition, he finished second at the Russian Championships in 2020 and third in 2018, 2019 and 2021.

== Early life ==
Gedekhauri was born on 30 July 1994 in Tbilisi, Georgia. He is the son of Greco-Roman wrestler Guram Gedekhauri.
