= 2018 European Wrestling Championships – Men's Greco-Roman 77 kg =

The Men's Greco-Roman 77 kg is a competition featured at the 2018 European Wrestling Championships, and was held in Kaspiysk, Russia on April 30 and May 1.

== Medalists ==
Gold	Roman Vlasov; Russia
Silver	Viktor Nemeš; Serbia
Bronze	Elvin Mursaliyev; Azerbaijan
Bronze	Tamás Lőrincz; Hungary

== Results ==
Legend

- F — Won by fall

=== Final ===
Final
Roman Vlasov (RUS)	5
Viktor Nemeš (SRB)	1

=== Top half ===
Round of 32

Round of 16
Tornike Dzamashvili (GEO)	7
Serkan Akkoyun (TUR)	5
Igor Beşleaga (MDA)	0
Roman Vlasov (RUS)	10
Mateusz Wolny (POL)	5
Matias Lipasti (FIN)	2
Elvin Mursaliyev (AZE)	12
Riccardo Abbrescia (ITA)	8

Quarterfinals
Tornike Dzamashvili (GEO)	0
Roman Vlasov (RUS)	4
Mateusz Wolny (POL)	2
Elvin Mursaliyev (AZE)	7

Semifinals
Roman Vlasov (RUS)	4
Elvin Mursaliyev (AZE)	0

=== Bottom half ===
Round of 32
Dominik Etlinger (CRO)	0
Viktor Nemeš (SRB)	4
Kazbek Kilou (BLR)	8
Georgios Prevolarakis (GRE)	0
Ruslan Pashkulskiy (BUL)	3
Mykola Daragan (UKR)	7
Igor Petrisnin (ISR)	0
Karapet Chalyan (ARM)	8
Nicolas Christen (SUI)	8
Oldřich Varga (CZE)	5
Alex Bjurberg Kessidis (SWE)	3
Florian Neumaier (GER)	1

Round of 16
Tamás Lőrincz (HUN)	4
Paulius Galkinas (LTU)	2
Viktor Nemeš (SRB)	6
Kazbek Kilou (BLR)	0
Mykola Daragan (UKR)	1
Karapet Chalyan (ARM)	9
Nicolas Christen (SUI)	0
Alex Bjurberg Kessidis (SWE)	5

Quarterfinals
Tamás Lőrincz (HUN)	1
Viktor Nemeš (SRB)	5
Karapet Chalyan (ARM)	3
Alex Bjurberg Kessidis (SWE)	6

Semifinals
Viktor Nemeš (SRB)	2
Alex Bjurberg Kessidis (SWE)	0

=== Repechage ===
Repechage round 1
Dominik Etlinger (CRO)	0
Kazbek Kilou (BLR)	8

Repechage round 2
Igor Beşleaga (MDA)	4
Tornike Dzamashvili (GEO)	5
Kazbek Kilou (BLR)	0
Tamás Lőrincz (HUN)	10

Bronze medals
Tornike Dzamashvili (GEO)	2
Elvin Mursaliyev (AZE)	6
Tamás Lőrincz (HUN)	7
Alex Bjurberg Kessidis (SWE)	2
