= 2014 European Wrestling Championships – Men's Greco-Roman 75 kg =

Wrestling competitions

The Men's Greco-Roman 75 kg is a competition featured at the 2014 European Wrestling Championships, and was held in Vantaa, Finland on 5 April 2014.

== Medalists ==
Gold	Alexander Chekhirkin; Russia
Silver	Arsen Julfalakyan; Armenia
Bronze	Elvin Mursaliyev; Azerbaijan
Bronze	Mark Madsen; Denmark

== Results ==
Legend

- C — Won by 3 cautions given to the opponent
- F — Won by fall

=== Final ===
Final
Alexander Chekhirkin (RUS)	4
Arsen Julfalakyan (ARM)	3

=== Top half ===
Round of 32
Zurabi Datunashvili (GEO)	7
Jan Rotter (GER)	2
Evgeni Pentorets (GRE)	0
Şeref Tüfenk (TUR)	6
László Szabó (HUN)	4
Valtteri Moisio (FIN)	2
Vojtech Jakus (SVK)	0
Valery Palenski (BLR)	6

Round of 16
Alexander Chekhirkin (RUS)	9
Elvin Mursaliyev (AZE)	1
Mateusz Wolny (POL)	6
Jonas Bossert (SUI)	0
Zurabi Datunashvili (GEO)	2
Şeref Tüfenk (TUR)	6^{C}
László Szabó (HUN)	3
Valery Palenski (BLR)	1

Quarterfinals
Alexander Chekhirkin (RUS)	7
Mateusz Wolny (POL)	4
Şeref Tüfenk (TUR)	4
László Szabó (HUN)	5

Semifinals
Alexander Chekhirkin (RUS)	6
László Szabó (HUN)	0

=== Bottom half ===
Round of 32
Neven Žugaj (CRO)	1
Arsen Julfalakyan (ARM)	1
Florian Marchl (AUT)	14
Ciro Russo (ITA)	4
Robert Rosengren (SWE)	2^{C}
Jure Kuhar (SLO)	0
Rafael Samurgashaev (MNE)	2
Petr Novák (CZE)	2
Aleksandrs Višņakovs (LAT)	5
Dmytro Pyshkov (UKR)	5
Mark Madsen (DEN)	8
Evrik Nikoghosyan (FRA)	0
Juan José Ruiz (ESP)	0
Viktor Nemeš (SRB)	8
Igor Beşleaga (MDA)	4^{F}
Ilian Georgiev (BUL)	0

Round of 16
Arsen Julfalakyan (ARM)	8
Florian Marchl (AUT)	0
Robert Rosengren (SWE)	10
Petr Novák (CZE)	5
Dmytro Pyshkov (UKR)	0
Mark Madsen (DEN)	8
Viktor Nemeš (SRB)	5
Igor Beşleaga (MDA)	2

Quarterfinals
Arsen Julfalakyan (ARM)	5
Robert Rosengren (SWE)	0
Mark Madsen (DEN)	4
Viktor Nemeš (SRB)	0

Semifinals
Arsen Julfalakyan (ARM)	2
Mark Madsen (DEN)	2

=== Repechage ===
Repechage round 1
Neven Žugaj (CRO)	6
Florian Marchl (AUT)	1

Repechage round 2
Elvin Mursaliyev (AZE)	3
Mateusz Wolny (POL)	2
Neven Žugaj (CRO)	0
Robert Rosengren (SWE)	8

Bronze medals
Elvin Mursaliyev (AZE)	8
László Szabó (HUN)	0
Robert Rosengren (SWE)	0
Mark Madsen (DEN)	2
