= 2019 European Wrestling Championships – Men's Greco-Roman 77 kg =

The Men's Greco-Roman 77 kg competition was featured at the 2019 European Wrestling Championships, and held in Bucharest, Romania on April 12 and 13.

== Medalists ==
Gold	Roman Vlasov; Russia
Silver	Roland Schwarz; Germany
Bronze	Viktor Nemeš; Serbia
Bronze	Arsen Julfalakyan; Armenia

== Results ==
Legend

- F — Won by fall

=== Final ===
Final
Roman Vlasov (RUS)	10
Roland Schwarz (GER)	0

=== Top half ===
Round of 32
Fatih Cengiz (TUR)	9
Leoš Drmola (SVK)	0
László Szabó (HUN)	3
Oldřich Varga (CZE)	0
Viktor Nemeš (SRB)	5
Igor Petrisnin (ISR)	1
Mykola Daragan (UKR)	6
Matias Lipasti (FIN)	5
Roman Vlasov (RUS)	9^{F}
Božo Starčević (CRO)	2

Round of 16
Evrik Nikoghosyan (FRA)	10
Per-Anders Kure (NOR)	0
Georgios Prevolarakis (GRE)	0
Fatih Cengiz (TUR)	3
László Szabó (HUN)	0
Viktor Nemeš (SRB)	4
Mykola Daragan (UKR)	0
Roman Vlasov (RUS)	9

Quarterfinals
Evrik Nikoghosyan (FRA)	0
Fatih Cengiz (TUR)	5
Viktor Nemeš (SRB)	3
Roman Vlasov (RUS)	5

Semifinals
Fatih Cengiz (TUR)	1
Roman Vlasov (RUS)	3

=== Bottom half ===
Round of 32
Alex Bjurberg Kessidis (SWE)	11
Pavel Liakh (BLR)	3
Daniel Cataraga (MDA)	3
Riccardo Abbrescia (ITA)	0
Roland Schwarz (GER)	6
Elvin Mursaliyev (AZE)	0
Arsen Julfalakyan (ARM)	5
Marcel Sterkenburg (NED)	3
Paulius Galkinas (LTU)	0
Daniel Aleksandrov (BUL)	9
Nicolas Christen (SUI)	3
Jevgēņijs Koļcovs (LAT)	1
Beka Mamukashvili (GEO)	6
Michael Wagner (AUT)	5
George Mariea (ROU)	1
Edgar Babayan (POL)	4

Round of 16
Alex Bjurberg Kessidis (SWE)	1
Daniel Cataraga (MDA)	9
Roland Schwarz (GER)	7
Arsen Julfalakyan (ARM)	3
Daniel Aleksandrov (BUL)	8
Nicolas Christen (SUI)	0
Beka Mamukashvili (GEO)	2
Edgar Babayan (POL)	7

Quarterfinals
Daniel Cataraga (MDA)	0
Roland Schwarz (GER)	6
Daniel Aleksandrov (BUL)	3
Edgar Babayan (POL)	3

Semifinals
Roland Schwarz (GER)	10
Daniel Aleksandrov (BUL)	2

=== Repechage ===
Repechage round 1
Božo Starčević (CRO)	6
Mykola Daragan (UKR)	1
Elvin Mursaliyev (AZE)	1
Arsen Julfalakyan (ARM)	2

Repechage round 2
Božo Starčević (CRO)	0
Viktor Nemeš (SRB)	4
Arsen Julfalakyan (ARM)	5
Daniel Cataraga (MDA)	1

Bronze medal match
Viktor Nemeš (SRB)	3
Fatih Cengiz (TUR)	1
Arsen Julfalakyan (ARM)	5
Daniel Aleksandrov (BUL)	1
