= Wrestling at the 2019 European Games – Men's Greco-Roman 77 kg =

Men's Greco-Roman 77 kg at the 2019 European Games
- Venue: Minsk Sports Palace
- Date: 28 June and 29 June
- Competitors: 16 from 16 nations

Medalists
gold medal	Aleksandr Chekhirkin	Russia
silver medal	Karapet Chalyan	Armenia
bronze medal	Alex Bjurberg Kessidis	Sweden
bronze medal	Tamás Lőrincz	Hungary

The Men's Greco-Roman 77 kilograms competition at the 2019 European Games in Minsk was held on 28 and 29 June 2019 at the Minsk Sports Palace.

== Schedule ==
All times are in FET (UTC+03:00)

Date	Time	Event
Friday, 28 June 2019	12:20	1/8 finals
Friday, 28 June 2019	13:10	Quarterfinals
Friday, 28 June 2019	18:20	Semifinals
Saturday, 29 June 2019	11:10	Repechage
Saturday, 29 June 2019	19:20	Finals

== Results ==
Legend

- F — Won by fall

=== Main bracket ===
1/8 finals
Aleksandar Maksimović (SRB)	3
Edgar Babayan (POL)	1
Yunus Emre Başar (TUR)	4
Nicolas Christen (SUI)	0
Daniel Aleksandrov (BUL)	3
Aleksandr Chekhirkin (RUS)	3
Alex Bjurberg Kessidis (SWE)	3
Gela Bolkvadze (GEO)	1
Pavel Liakh (BLR)	3
Florian Neumaier (GER)	1
Tamás Lőrincz (HUN)	10
Gil Nugues (FRA)	2
Karapet Chalyan (ARM)	9
Elmar Nuraliiev (UKR)	0
Igor Beşleaga (MDA)	4
Božo Starčević (CRO)	3

Quarterfinals
Aleksandar Maksimović (SRB)	4
Yunus Emre Başar (TUR)	6
Aleksandr Chekhirkin (RUS)	6
Alex Bjurberg Kessidis (SWE)	0
Pavel Liakh (BLR)	1
Tamás Lőrincz (HUN)	3
Karapet Chalyan (ARM)	2
Igor Beşleaga (MDA)	1

Semifinals
Yunus Emre Başar (TUR)	0
Aleksandr Chekhirkin (RUS)	8
Tamás Lőrincz (HUN)	1
Karapet Chalyan (ARM)	4

Final
Aleksandr Chekhirkin (RUS)	7
Karapet Chalyan (ARM)	6

=== Repechage ===
Repechage round 1
Daniel Aleksandrov (BUL)	5
Alex Bjurberg Kessidis (SWE)	4^{F}
Elmar Nuraliiev (UKR)	0
Igor Beşleaga (MDA)	7

Bronze medals
Alex Bjurberg Kessidis (SWE)	12^{F}
Yunus Emre Başar (TUR)	3
Igor Beşleaga (MDA)	1
Tamás Lőrincz (HUN)	5
