= 2020 Individual Wrestling World Cup – Men's Greco-Roman 77 kg =

The Men's Greco-Roman 77 kg is a competition featured at the 2020 Individual Wrestling World Cup, and was held in Belgrade, Serbia on 12 and 13 December 2020.

== Medalists ==
Gold	Roman Vlasov; Russia
Silver	Zoltán Lévai; Hungary
Bronze	Alexandrin Guțu; Moldova
Bronze	Viktor Nemeš; Serbia

== Results ==
Legend

- F — Won by fall
- WO — Won by walkover

1/16 finals
	Score	
Abdelkrim Ouakali (ALG)	4–7	Akzhol Makhmudov (KGZ)
Roman Zhernovetski (ISR)	0–8	Viktor Nemeš (SRB)
Matteo Maffezzoli (ITA)	3–2	Johnny Bur (FRA)
Karapet Chalyan (ARM)	4–0	Iwan Nylypiuk (POL)
Sanan Suleymanov (AZE)	0–9	Pascal Eisele (GER)
Roman Vlasov (RUS)	10–0	Georgios Prevolarakis (GRE)

1/8 finals
Alexandrin Guțu (MDA)	4
Zoltán Lévai (HUN)	7
Denis Horváth (SVK)	4
Rosian Dermanski (BUL)	1
Sajan Bhanwal (IND)	0
Pavel Liakh (BLR)	9
Yasaf Zeinalov (UKR)	4
Ilie Cojocari (ROU)	1
Furkan Bayrak (TUR)	3
Jakub Bielesz (CZE)	1
Akzhol Makhmudov (KGZ)	0
Viktor Nemeš (SRB)	3
Matteo Maffezzoli (ITA)	2
Karapet Chalyan (ARM)	4
Pascal Eisele (GER)	6
Roman Vlasov (RUS)	8

Quarterfinals
Zoltán Lévai (HUN)	5
Denis Horváth (SVK)	1
Pavel Liakh (BLR)	2
Yasaf Zeinalov (UKR)	3
Furkan Bayrak (TUR)	0
Viktor Nemeš (SRB)	4
Karapet Chalyan (ARM)	1
Roman Vlasov (RUS)	3

Semifinals
Zoltán Lévai (HUN)	1
Yasaf Zeinalov (UKR)	1
Viktor Nemeš (SRB)	1
Roman Vlasov (RUS)	2

Final
Zoltán Lévai (HUN)	1
Roman Vlasov (RUS)	6

Repechage round 1
Georgios Prevolarakis (GRE)
Pascal Eisele (GER)	WO

Repechage round 2
Alexandrin Guțu (MDA)	13
Denis Horváth (SVK)	3
Pascal Eisele (GER)	1
Karapet Chalyan (ARM)	4

Bronze medals
Alexandrin Guțu (MDA)	6
Yasaf Zeinalov (UKR)	4
Karapet Chalyan (ARM)	1
Viktor Nemeš (SRB)	4
