= 2026 European Wrestling Championships – Men's Greco-Roman 82 kg =

Men's Greco-Roman 82 kg at the 2026 European Wrestling Championships
- Venue: Tirana Olympic Park
- Location: Tirana, Albania
- Dates: 21–22 April
- Competitors: 14 from 13 nations

Medalists
gold medal	Gurban Gurbanov	Azerbaijan
silver medal	Adlet Tiuliubaev
bronze medal	Gela Bolkvadze	Georgia
bronze medal	Zoltán Lévai	Hungary

The men's Greco-Roman 82 kilograms competition at the 2026 European Wrestling Championships was held from 21 to 22 April 2026 at the Tirana Olympic Park in Tirana, Albania.

== Results ==
Legend

- F — Won by fall
- R — Retired
- WO — Won by walkover

=== Main bracket ===
Round of 16
~~Klodjan Shehu (ALB)~~
Yüksel Sarıçiçek (TUR)	WO
Gurban Gurbanov (AZE)	7
Svetoslav Nikolov (BUL)	3
Ibrahim Tabaev (BEL)	0
Mihail Bradu (MDA)	10
Karlo Kodrić (CRO)	3
Ruslan Abdiiev (UKR)	1
Samvel Grigoryan (ARM)	1
Viktor Nemeš (SRB)	0^{R}
Zoltán Lévai (HUN)	3
Michal Zelenka (CZE)	0

Quarterfinals
Gela Bolkvadze (GEO)	9
Yüksel Sarıçiçek (TUR)	2
Gurban Gurbanov (AZE)	5
Mihail Bradu (MDA)	4
Karlo Kodrić (CRO)	8
Samvel Grigoryan (ARM)	5
Zoltán Lévai (HUN)	1
Adlet Tiuliubaev (UWW)	9

Semifinals
Gela Bolkvadze (GEO)	1
Gurban Gurbanov (AZE)	2
Karlo Kodrić (CRO)	3
Adlet Tiuliubaev (UWW)	7

Final
Gurban Gurbanov (AZE)	4
Adlet Tiuliubaev (UWW)	2

=== Repechage ===
Repechage round 1
Svetoslav Nikolov (BUL)	3
Mihail Bradu (MDA)	12

Bronze medal matches
Mihail Bradu (MDA)	1
Gela Bolkvadze (GEO)	1
Zoltán Lévai (HUN)	11
Karlo Kodrić (CRO)	2

== Final standing ==
Rank	Wrestler
1st place, gold medalist(s)	Gurban Gurbanov (AZE)
2nd place, silver medalist(s)	Adlet Tiuliubaev (UWW)
3rd place, bronze medalist(s)	Gela Bolkvadze (GEO)
3rd place, bronze medalist(s)	Zoltán Lévai (HUN)
5	Mihail Bradu (MDA)
5	Karlo Kodrić (CRO)
7	Samvel Grigoryan (ARM)
8	Yüksel Sarıçiçek (TUR)
9	Svetoslav Nikolov (BUL)
10	Ruslan Abdiiev (UKR)
11	Viktor Nemeš (SRB)
12	Michal Zelenka (CZE)
13	Ibrahim Tabaev (BEL)
—	Klodjan Shehu (ALB)
