= 2018 World University Wrestling Championships =

- Host city: Goiânia, Brazil
- Dates: 4-9 September

Champions
- Freestyle: Japan
- Greco-Roman: Turkey
- Women: Canada

The 2018 World University Wrestling Championships were the 13th edition of World University Wrestling Championships of combined events and were held from 4 to 9 September in Goiânia, Brazil.

Turkey claimed 10 gold medals, 1 silver medal and 4 bronze medals. In total 12 nations participated in this event.

== Medal table ==
Rank	Nation	Gold	Silver	Bronze	Total
1	Turkey (TUR)	10	1	4	15
2	Japan (JPN)	7	11	1	19
3	Canada (CAN)	4	5	4	13
4	Russia (RUS)	4	3	3	10
5	Hungary (HUN)	2	4	5	11
6	Germany (GER)	2	1	3	6
7	Bulgaria (BUL)	1	0	1	2
8	Poland (POL)	0	2	8	10
9	Brazil (BRA)	0	1	10	11
10	Mexico (MEX)	0	1	8	9
11	Belarus (BLR)	0	1	2	3
12	Slovakia (SVK)	0	0	1	1
Totals (12 entries)		30	30	50	110

== Team ranking ==
Rank	Men's freestyle		Men's Greco-Roman		Women's freestyle	
Rank	Team	Points	Team	Points	Team	Points
1	Japan	180	Turkey	190	Canada	175
2	Turkey	140	Japan	130	Japan	135
3	Russia	116	Brazil	100	Germany	82
4	Canada	100	Russia	80	Poland	77
5	Hungary	95	Hungary	79	Brazil	71
6	Brazil	83	Poland	57	Mexico	54
7	Mexico	71	Bulgaria	50	Hungary	25
8	Poland	32	Mexico	49	Russia	15
9	Germany	12	Belarus	47		
10	Slovakia	10	Slovakia	12		

== Medal summary ==
=== Men's freestyle ===
Event	Gold	Silver	Bronze
57 kg	Yudai Fujita Japan	Samuel Jagas Canada	John Garcia Parra Mexico
57 kg	Yudai Fujita Japan	Samuel Jagas Canada	Diego Rodrigues Brazil
61 kg	Eduard Grigorev Russia	Raimu Maeda Japan	Mehmet Ali Daylak Turkey
61 kg	Eduard Grigorev Russia	Raimu Maeda Japan	Cruz Estrada Mexico
65 kg	Kei Yonezawa Japan	Selim Kozan Turkey	Vincent Demarinis Canada
65 kg	Kei Yonezawa Japan	Selim Kozan Turkey	Mateusz Nejman Poland
70 kg	Kirin Kinoshita Japan	Murad Nukhkadiev Russia	László Gergely Hungary
70 kg	Kirin Kinoshita Japan	Murad Nukhkadiev Russia	Haydar Yavuz Turkey
74 kg	Muhammet Akdeniz Turkey	Mao Okui Japan	Tyler Rowe Canada
79 kg	Tazhitin Akaev Russia	Yajuro Yamasaki Japan	Muhammed Lütfi Küçükyıldırım Turkey
79 kg	Tazhitin Akaev Russia	Yajuro Yamasaki Japan	Matthias Schmidt Germany
86 kg	Osman Göçen Turkey	Mihály Nagy Hungary	Alex Moore Canada
86 kg	Osman Göçen Turkey	Mihály Nagy Hungary	Andrey Purikhov Russia
92 kg	Mustafa Sessiz Turkey	Bendegúz Tóth Hungary	Takashi Ishiguro Japan
92 kg	Mustafa Sessiz Turkey	Bendegúz Tóth Hungary	Gabriel Lira Brazil
97 kg	Asadula Ibragimov Russia	Taira Sonoda Japan	Márton Tóth Hungary
97 kg	Asadula Ibragimov Russia	Taira Sonoda Japan	Carlos López Pérez Mexico
125 kg	Balint Borsos Hungary	Sean Molle Canada	Felipe Danese Brazil

=== Men's Greco-Roman ===
Event	Gold	Silver	Bronze
55 kg	Ekrem Öztürk Turkey	Hiromu Katagiri Japan	No medal
60 kg	Rodoslav Vasilev Bulgaria	Kiyoshi Kawaguchi Japan	Şerif Kılıç Turkey
60 kg	Rodoslav Vasilev Bulgaria	Kiyoshi Kawaguchi Japan	Roberto Queiroz Brazil
63 kg	Yusuke Kitaoka Japan	Ruben Minasian Russia	Oliveres Banuelos Mexico
63 kg	Yusuke Kitaoka Japan	Ruben Minasian Russia	Calebe Ferreira Brazil
67 kg	Arten Manasov Russia	Bence Balatoni Hungary	Danilo Aquino Brazil
67 kg	Arten Manasov Russia	Bence Balatoni Hungary	Rodolfo Salazar Guijarro Mexico
72 kg	Murat Dağ Turkey	Takahiro Yamamoto Japan	Robert Fritsch Hungary
72 kg	Murat Dağ Turkey	Takahiro Yamamoto Japan	Nasario Suaste Torres Mexico
77 kg	Fatih Cengiz Turkey	Iwan Nylypiuk Poland	Shuai Mamedau Belarus
77 kg	Fatih Cengiz Turkey	Iwan Nylypiuk Poland	Leos Drmola Slovakia
82 kg	Burhan Akbudak Turkey	Tatsuya Fujii Japan	Rosian Dermanski Bulgaria
82 kg	Burhan Akbudak Turkey	Tatsuya Fujii Japan	Maksym Zakharchuk Poland
87 kg	Ali Cengiz Turkey	Lllia Laurynovich Belarus	André Pinto Brazil
87 kg	Ali Cengiz Turkey	Lllia Laurynovich Belarus	Mihály Nagy Hungary
97 kg	Fatih Başköy Turkey	Bendegúz Tóth Hungary	Andemir Tenov Russia
97 kg	Fatih Başköy Turkey	Bendegúz Tóth Hungary	Anton Dzmitrychenka Belarus
130 kg	Osman Yıldırım Turkey	Zurabi Gedekhauri Russia	Marcin Luto Poland
130 kg	Osman Yıldırım Turkey	Zurabi Gedekhauri Russia	Balint Borsos Hungary

=== Women's freestyle ===
Event	Gold	Silver	Bronze
50 kg	Jade Dufour Canada	Kika Kagata Japan	Weronika Sikora Poland
50 kg	Jade Dufour Canada	Kika Kagata Japan	Muñoz Diaz Mexico
53 kg	Miho Igarashi Japan	Annika Wendle Germany	Evelyn Santos Brazil
55 kg	Elena Brugger Germany	Momoka Kadoya Japan	Katarzyna Michalak Poland
55 kg	Elena Brugger Germany	Momoka Kadoya Japan	Selma Rojas Mondragon Mexico
57 kg	Ramóna Galambos Hungary	Alexandria Town Canada	Alexandra Andreeva Russia
57 kg	Ramóna Galambos Hungary	Alexandria Town Canada	Jowita Wrzesien Poland
59 kg	Laurence Beauregard Canada	Beatriz Andrade Brazil	No medal
62 kg	Linda Morais Canada	Honoka Imagawa Japan	Katarzyna Madrowska Poland
62 kg	Linda Morais Canada	Honoka Imagawa Japan	Luzie Manzke Germany
65 kg	Misuzu Enomoto Japan	Haley Heffel Canada	No medal
68 kg	Indira Moores Canada	Robles Castellanos Mexico	Gabriela Rocha Brazil
72 kg	Mei Shindo Japan	Natalia Strzalka Poland	Shauna Kuebeck Canada
72 kg	Mei Shindo Japan	Natalia Strzalka Poland	Kauanny Ramos Brazil
76 kg	Francy Rädelt Germany	Taylor Follensbee Canada	No medal

== Participating nations ==
139 competitors from 12 nations participated.

- Belarus (3)
- Brazil (22)
- Bulgaria (3)
- Canada (15)
- Germany (6)
- Hungary (11)
- Japan (23)
- Mexico (15)
- Poland (12)
- Russia (12)
- Slovakia (2)
- Turkey (15)
