= Zoltán Lévai =

Hungarian Greco-Roman wrestler

Personal information
- Born: 30 January 1996 (age 30)
- Height: 173 cm (5 ft 8 in)
- Weight: 75 kg (165 lb)

Sport
- Country: Hungary
- Sport: Amateur wrestling
- Weight class: 77 kg
- Event: Greco-Roman
Medal record
Men's Greco-Roman wrestling
Representing Hungary
World Championships
Silver medal – second place	2022 Belgrade	77 kg
European Championships
Silver medal – second place	2020 Rome	77 kg
Bronze medal – third place	2023 Zagreb	77 kg
Bronze medal – third place	2026 Tirana	82 kg
Individual World Cup
Silver medal – second place	2020 Belgrade	77 kg
World Military Championships
Gold medal – first place	2025 Warendorf	77 kg
Grand Prix
Gold medal – first place	2015 Zagreb	71 kg
Gold medal – first place	2020 Rome	77 kg
Gold medal – first place	2021 Rome	77 kg
Gold medal – first place	2022 Rome	77 kg
Silver medal – second place	2024 Zagreb	77 kg
Silver medal – second place	2025 Zagreb	77 kg
Silver medal – second place	2025 Budapest	82 kg
Silver medal – second place	2026 Zagreb	77 kg
European U23 Championships
Gold medal – first place	2017 Szombathely	75 kg
Gold medal – first place	2019 Novi Sad	82 kg
Bronze medal – third place	2015 Walbrzych	71 kg
Bronze medal – third place	2016 Russe	75 kg
World Junior Championship
Bronze medal – third place	2014 Zagreb	66 kg
Bronze medal – third place	2015 Bahia	74 kg
Bronze medal – third place	2016 Macon	74 kg
European Juniors Championships
Gold medal – first place	2016 Bucharest	74 kg
Bronze medal – third place	2015 Istanbul	74 kg
World Cadets Championships
Bronze medal – third place	2011 Szombathely	46 kg
European Cadets Championships
Bronze medal – third place	2011 Warsaw	46 kg
Bronze medal – third place	2013 Bar	63 kg
Representing All-World Team
World Cup
Bronze medal – third place	2022 Baku	Team

Zoltán Lévai (born 30 January 1996) is a Hungarian Greco-Roman wrestler. He won the silver medal in the 77 kg event at the 2022 World Wrestling Championships held in Belgrade, Serbia. He also won the silver medal in the 77 kg event at the 2020 European Wrestling Championships held in Rome, Italy.

== Career ==
He competed in the 82 kg event at the 2019 World Wrestling Championships held in Nur-Sultan, Kazakhstan. He was eliminated in his second match by Rajbek Bisultanov of Denmark.

In 2020, he won the silver medal in the 77 kg event at the European Wrestling Championships held in Rome, Italy. He also won the silver medal in this event at the 2020 Individual Wrestling World Cup held in Belgrade, Serbia.

In 2021, he won the gold medal in the 77 kg event at the Matteo Pellicone Ranking Series 2021 held in Rome, Italy. He won the silver medal in the 77 kg event at the 2022 World Wrestling Championships held in Belgrade, Serbia.

He competed in the 77 kg event at the 2024 Summer Olympics in Paris, France.

== Achievements ==
Year	Tournament	Location	Result	Event
2020	European Championships	Rome, Italy	2nd	Greco-Roman 77 kg
2022	World Championships	Belgrade, Serbia	2nd	Greco-Roman 77 kg
2023	European Championships	Zagreb, Croatia	3rd	Greco-Roman 77 kg
