= Alex Kessidis =

Swedish Greco-Roman wrestler

Alex Bjurberg Kessidis
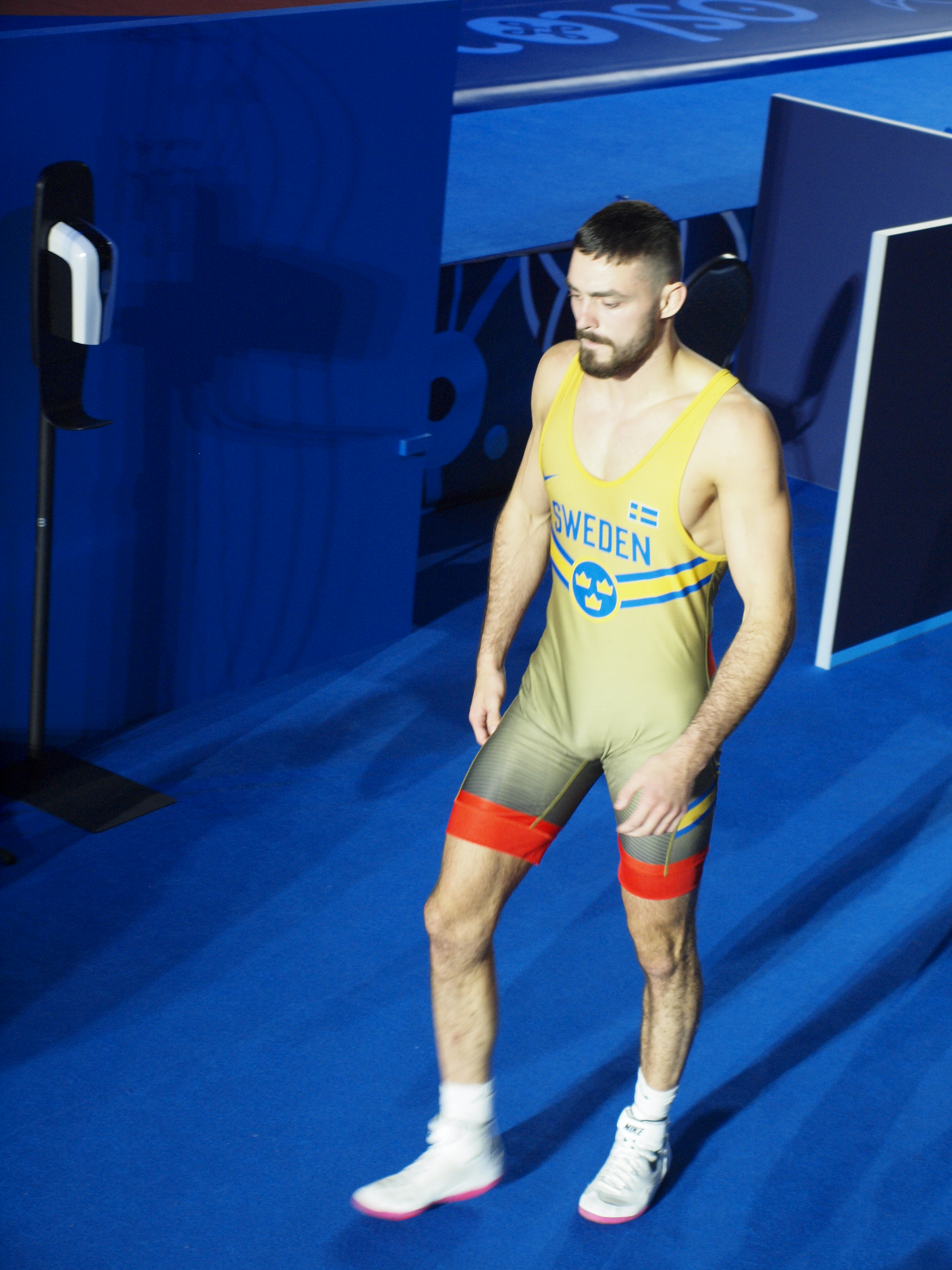
- Kessidis at the 2021 World Wrestling Championships in Oslo, Norway

Personal information
- Full name: Alex Michel Bjurberg Kessidis
- Born: 23 March 1995 (age 31)
- Height: 187 cm (6 ft 2 in)

Sport
- Country: Sweden
- Sport: Amateur wrestling
- Weight class: 77 kg
- Event: Greco-Roman
Medal record
Men's Greco-Roman wrestling
Representing Sweden
World Championships
Silver medal – second place	2019 Nur-Sultan	77 kg
Bronze medal – third place	2022 Belgrade	87 kg
European Championships
Bronze medal – third place	2020 Rome	77 kg
European Games
Bronze medal – third place	2019 Minsk	77 kg
Representing All-World Team
World Cup
Bronze medal – third place	2022 Baku	Team

Alex Michel Bjurberg Kessidis (born 23 March 1995) is a Swedish Greco-Roman wrestler. He is a silver medalist at the 2019 World Wrestling Championships and a bronze medalist at the 2020 European Wrestling Championships and the 2019 European Games. He represented Sweden at the 2020 Summer Olympics in Tokyo, Japan.

== Early life ==
Kessidis and his brother Laokratis Kessidis, also a Greco-Roman wrestler, were born and raised in Sweden by a Greek father and a Swedish mother. In wrestling competitions his brother had chosen to represent Greece whereas Alex Kessidis represents Sweden.

== Career ==
He competed in the 80 kg event at the 2016 World Wrestling Championships held in Budapest, Hungary and in the same event at the 2017 World Wrestling Championships held in Paris, France. The following year, he competed in the 77 kg event at the 2018 European Wrestling Championships held in Kaspiysk, Russia. In the same year, he reached the semi-finals in the 77 kg event at the 2018 World Wrestling Championships held in Budapest, Hungary where he lost against Aleksandr Chekhirkin of Russia. He then also lost his bronze medal match against Viktor Nemeš of Serbia.

He won the silver medal at the 77 kg event at the 2019 World Wrestling Championships held in Nur-Sultan, Kazakhstan. In the same year, he also competed at the 2019 European Games held in Minsk, Belarus and he won one of the bronze medals in the 77 kg event.

In 2020, he won one of the bronze medals in the 77 kg event at the European Wrestling Championships held in Rome, Italy. In his bronze medal match he defeated Volodymyr Yakovliev of Ukraine.

In January 2021, he won the gold medal in the 82 kg event at the 2021 Grand Prix Zagreb Open held in Zagreb, Croatia. In April 2021, he was eliminated in his second match in the 82 kg event at the European Wrestling Championships in Warsaw, Poland. In June 2021, he won one of the bronze medals in his event at the 2021 Wladyslaw Pytlasinski Cup held in Warsaw, Poland.

He competed in the 77 kg event at the 2020 Summer Olympics held in Tokyo, Japan where he was eliminated in his first match by Rafig Huseynov of Azerbaijan. Two months after the Olympics, he lost his bronze medal match in the 82 kg event at the 2021 World Wrestling Championships held in Oslo, Norway.

In 2022, he competed at the Matteo Pellicone Ranking Series held in Rome, Italy. He lost his bronze medal match in the 87 kg event at the 2022 World Wrestling Championships held in Belgrade, Serbia.

He competed at the 2024 European Wrestling Olympic Qualification Tournament in Baku, Azerbaijan hoping to qualify for the 2024 Summer Olympics in Paris, France. He was eliminated in his first match and he did not qualify for the Olympics.

== Achievements ==
Year	Tournament	Location	Result	Event
2019	European Games	Minsk, Belarus	3rd	Greco-Roman 77 kg
2019	World Championships	Nur-Sultan, Kazakhstan	2nd	Greco-Roman 77 kg
2020	European Championships	Rome, Italy	3rd	Greco-Roman 77 kg
