= Jalgasbay Berdimuratov =

Uzbekistani Greco-Roman wrestler

Personal information
- Nationality: Uzbekistan
- Born: 27 March 1997 (age 29) Nukus, Uzbekistan

Sport
- Country: Uzbekistan
- Sport: Amateur wrestling
- Weight class: 87 kg
- Event: Greco-Roman
Medal record
Men's Greco-Roman wrestling
Representing Uzbekistan
World Championships
Silver medal – second place	2022 Belgrade	82 kg
Bronze medal – third place	2019 Nur-Sultan	77 kg
Asian Championships
Gold medal – first place	2021 Almaty	82 kg
Gold medal – first place	2025 Amman	87 kg
Silver medal – second place	2022 Ulaanbaatar	87 kg
Bronze medal – third place	2020 New Delhi	82 kg
Bronze medal – third place	2023 Astana	87 kg
Asian Games
Gold medal – first place	2022 Hangzhou	87 kg
Bronze medal – third place	2026 Aichi-Nagoya	87 kg
Islamic Solidarity Games
Gold medal – first place	2021 Konya	87 kg
Grand Prix
Gold medal – first place	2021 Warsaw	82 kg
Gold medal – first place	2023 Bishkek	87 kg
Bronze medal – third place	2022 Almaty	87 kg
Bronze medal – third place	2025 Budapest	82 kg
Representing All-World Team
World Cup
Bronze medal – third place	2022 Baku	Team

Jalgasbay Berdimuratov (born 27 March 1997) is an Uzbekistani Greco-Roman wrestler. He is a two-time medalist at the World Wrestling Championships. He is a four-time medalist, including gold, at the Asian Wrestling Championships. He is also a gold medalist at the 2021 Islamic Solidarity Games.

== Career ==
Berdimuratov won one of the bronze medals in the 77 kg at the 2019 World Wrestling Championships held in Nur-Sultan, Kazakhstan. He represented Uzbekistan at the 2020 Summer Olympics in Tokyo, Japan. He competed in the men's 77 kg event where he was eliminated in his first match.

In 2021, Berdimuratov won the gold medal in his event at the Wladyslaw Pytlasinski Cup held in Warsaw, Poland.

Berdimuratov won the silver medal in his event at the 2022 Asian Wrestling Championships held in Ulaanbaatar, Mongolia. He won the gold medal in his event at the 2021 Islamic Solidarity Games held in Konya, Turkey.

In 2023, Berdimuratov won the gold medal in the 87 kg event at the 2022 Asian Games held in Hangzhou, China. He defeated Nasser Alizadeh of Iran in his gold medal match.

He competed at the 2024 Asian Wrestling Olympic Qualification Tournament in Bishkek, Kyrgyzstan hoping to qualify for the 2024 Summer Olympics in Paris, France. He was eliminated in his second match and he did not qualify for the Olympics. Berdimuratov also competed at the 2024 World Wrestling Olympic Qualification Tournament held in Istanbul, Turkey without qualifying for the Olympics.

== Achievements ==
Year	Tournament	Location	Result	Event
2019	World Championships	Nur-Sultan, Kazakhstan	3rd	Greco-Roman 77 kg
2020	Asian Championships	New Delhi, India	3rd	Greco-Roman 82 kg
2021	Asian Championships	Almaty, Kazakhstan	1st	Greco-Roman 82 kg
2022	Asian Championships	Ulaanbaatar, Mongolia	2nd	Greco-Roman 87 kg
2022	Islamic Solidarity Games	Konya, Turkey	1st	Greco-Roman 87 kg
2022	World Championships	Belgrade, Serbia	2nd	Greco-Roman 82 kg
2023	Asian Championships	Astana, Kazakhstan	3rd	Greco-Roman 87 kg
2023	Asian Games	Hangzhou, China	1st	Greco-Roman 87 kg
