= 2021 European Wrestling Championships – Men's Greco-Roman 77 kg =

Wrestling competition

The Men's Greco-Roman 77 kg is a competition featured at the 2021 European Wrestling Championships, and was held in Warsaw, Poland on April 23 and April 24.

== Medalists ==
Gold	Tamás Lőrincz; Hungary
Silver	Yunus Emre Başar; Turkey
Bronze	Sanan Suleymanov; Azerbaijan
Bronze	Antonio Kamenjašević; Croatia

== Results ==
Legend

- F — Won by fall

=== Final ===
Final
Yunus Emre Başar (TUR)	0
Tamás Lőrincz (HUN)	8

=== Top half ===
Round of 32
Fabio Dietsche (SUI)	1
Daniel Cataraga (MDA)	9
Abuyazid Mantsigov (RUS)	9
Denis Horváth (SVK)	0

Round of 16
Waltteri Latvala (FIN)	0
Sanan Suleymanov (AZE)	10
Varuzhan Grigoryan (ARM)	0
Yunus Emre Başar (TUR)	9
Jakub Bielesz (CZE)	0
Dmytro Pyshkov (UKR)	10
Daniel Cataraga (MDA)	1
Abuyazid Mantsigov (RUS)	10

Quarterfinals
Sanan Suleymanov (AZE)	5
Yunus Emre Başar (TUR)	8
Dmytro Pyshkov (UKR)	12
Abuyazid Mantsigov (RUS)	3

Semifinals
Yunus Emre Başar (TUR)	4
Dmytro Pyshkov (UKR)	0

=== Bottom half ===
Round of 32
Iwan Nylypiuk (POL)	3
Stoyan Kubatov (BUL)	1
Michael Widmayer (GER)	9
Exauce Mukubu (NOR)	0
Mantas Sinkevičius (LTU)	4
Aleksa Erski (SRB)	0
Roman Zhernovetski (ISR)	0
Riccardo Abbrescia (ITA)	9
Tsimur Berdyieu (BLR)	11
Johnny Bur (FRA)	2
Bogdan Kourinnoi (SWE)	0
Sachino Davitaia (GEO)	9
Antonio Kamenjašević (CRO)	3
Georgios Prevolarakis (GRE)	1
Ilie Cojocari (ROU)	0
Tamás Lőrincz (HUN)	7

Round of 16
Iwan Nylypiuk (POL)	0
Michael Widmayer (GER)	5
Mantas Sinkevičius (LTU)	0
Riccardo Abbrescia (ITA)	8
Tsimur Berdyieu (BLR)	6
Sachino Davitaia (GEO)	5
Antonio Kamenjašević (CRO)	4
Tamás Lőrincz (HUN)	6

Quarterfinals
Michael Widmayer (GER)	9
Riccardo Abbrescia (ITA)	1
Tsimur Berdyieu (BLR)	0
Tamás Lőrincz (HUN)	9

Semifinals
Michael Widmayer (GER)	0
Tamás Lőrincz (HUN)	5

=== Repechage ===
Repechage round 1
Ilie Cojocari (ROU)	1
Antonio Kamenjašević (CRO)	5

Repechage round 2
Varuzhan Grigoryan (ARM)	0
Sanan Suleymanov (AZE)	11
Antonio Kamenjašević (CRO)	9
Tsimur Berdyieu (BLR)	1

Bronze medals
Sanan Suleymanov (AZE)	6
Dmytro Pyshkov (UKR)	0
Antonio Kamenjašević (CRO)	5
Michael Widmayer (GER)	1

== Final standing ==
Rank	Athlete
1st place, gold medalist(s)	Tamás Lőrincz (HUN)
2nd place, silver medalist(s)	Yunus Emre Başar (TUR)
3rd place, bronze medalist(s)	Sanan Suleymanov (AZE)
3rd place, bronze medalist(s)	Antonio Kamenjašević (CRO)
5	Dmytro Pyshkov (UKR)
5	Michael Widmayer (GER)
7	Abuyazid Mantsigov (RUS)
8	Riccardo Abbrescia (ITA)
9	Tsimur Berdyieu (BLR)
10	Sachino Davitaia (GEO)
11	Daniel Cataraga (MDA)
12	Mantas Sinkevičius (LTU)
13	Iwan Nylypiuk (POL)
14	Johnny Bur (FRA)
15	Stoyan Kubatov (BUL)
16	Georgios Prevolarakis (GRE)
17	Fabio Dietsche (SUI)
18	Ilie Cojocari (ROU)
19	Aleksa Erski (SRB)
20	Denis Horváth (SVK)
21	Exauce Mukubu (NOR)
22	Roman Zhernovetski (ISR)
23	Bogdan Kourinnoi (SWE)
24	Waltteri Latvala (FIN)
25	Jakub Bielesz (CZE)
26	Varuzhan Grigoryan (ARM)
