= 2018 Dan Kolov & Nikola Petrov Tournament =

- Host city: Sofia, Bulgaria
- Dates: 22–25 March 2018

Champions
- Freestyle: Russia
- Greco-Roman: Turkey
- Women: Russia

The 56th Dan Kolov & Nikola Petrov Tournament was a sport wrestling event held in Sofia, Bulgaria between 22 and 25 March 2018.

This international tournament includes competition in both men's and women's freestyle wrestling and men's Greco-Roman wrestling. This tournament is held in honor of Dan Kolov who was the first European freestyle wrestling champion from Bulgaria and European and World Champion Nikola Petroff.

== Event videos ==
The event was aired freely on the Bulgarian Wrestling Federation Live YouTube channel.

Broadcast
22 March 2018-Qualification Mat A	22 March 2018-Qualification Mat B	22 March 2018-Qualification Mat C	22 March 2018-Qualification Mat D
22 March 2018-1/2 Finals Mat A	22 March 2018-1/2 Finals Mat B	22 March 2018-1/2 Finals Mat C	22 March 2018-1/2 Finals Mat D
23 March 2018-Qualification Mat A	23 March 2018-Qualification Mat B	23 March 2018-Qualification Mat C	23 March 2018-Qualification Mat D
23 March 2018-Finals Mat A	23 March 2018-Finals Mat B	23 March 2018-Finals Mat C	23 March 2018-Finals Mat D
24 March 2018-Qualification Mat A	24 March 2018-Qualification Mat B	24 March 2018-Qualification Mat C	24 March 2018-Qualification Mat D
24 March 2018-Finals Mat A	24 March 2018-Finals Mat B	24 March 2018-Finals Mat C	24 March 2018-Finals Mat D
25 March 2018-Qualification Mat B	25 March 2018-Qualification Mat C		
25 March 2018-Finals Mat A	25 March 2018-Finals Mat B	25 March 2018-Finals Mat C	

== Medal table ==
Rank	Nation	Gold	Silver	Bronze	Total
1	Russia	8	10	7	25
2	Turkey	5	3	11	19
3	Bulgaria	4	1	6	11
4	Poland	4	0	2	6
5	Azerbaijan	2	0	2	4
6	Georgia	1	3	5	9
7	Japan	1	2	1	4
8	Serbia	1	1	1	3
9	Czech Republic	1	0	1	2
9	Germany	1	0	1	2
9	Hungary	1	0	1	2
12	Italy	1	0	0	1
13	France	0	3	2	5
14	Ukraine	0	2	6	8
15	Romania	0	2	2	4
16	Kazakhstan	0	1	1	2
17	Mongolia	0	1	0	1
17	Spain	0	1	0	1
19	Moldova	0	0	6	6
20	Greece	0	0	1	1
20	Latvia	0	0	1	1
20	Norway	0	0	1	1
20	Slovakia	0	0	1	1
20	Tunisia	0	0	1	1
Totals (24 entries)		30	30	60	120

== Team ranking ==
Rank	Men's freestyle		Men's Greco-Roman		Women's freestyle	
Rank	Team	Points	Team	Points	Team	Points
1	Russia	210	Turkey	165	Russia	184
2	Turkey	152	Bulgaria	129	Poland	130
3	Georgia	120	Japan	109	Bulgaria	106
4	Bulgaria	95	Ukraine	99	Turkey	88
5	Ukraine	94	Romania	93	Germany	72

== Medal overview ==
=== Men's freestyle ===
Event	Gold	Silver	Bronze
57 kg	Zaur Uguev; Russia	Zoheir El-Ouarraqe; France	Barış Kaya; Turkey
57 kg	Zaur Uguev; Russia	Zoheir El-Ouarraqe; France	Ahmet Peker; Turkey
61 kg	Vladimir Dubov; Bulgaria	Shingo Arimoto; Japan	Otari Gogava; Georgia
61 kg	Vladimir Dubov; Bulgaria	Shingo Arimoto; Japan	Recep Topal; Turkey
65 kg	Gadzhimurad Rashidov; Russia	Vasyl Shuptar; Ukraine	Selahattin Kılıçsallayan; Turkey
65 kg	Gadzhimurad Rashidov; Russia	Vasyl Shuptar; Ukraine	Gor Oganesyan; Ukraine
70 kg	Ilyas Bekbulatov; Russia	Haydar Yavuz; Turkey	Miroslav Kirov; Bulgaria
70 kg	Ilyas Bekbulatov; Russia	Haydar Yavuz; Turkey	Tajmuraz Salkazanov; Slovakia
74 kg	Frank Chamizo; Italy	Soner Demirtaş; Turkey	Mahamedkhabib Kadzimahamedau; Russia
74 kg	Frank Chamizo; Italy	Soner Demirtaş; Turkey	Vasyl Mykhailov; Ukraine
79 kg	Akhmed Gadzhimagomedov; Russia	Alan Zaseev; Russia	Nika Kentchadze; Georgia
79 kg	Akhmed Gadzhimagomedov; Russia	Alan Zaseev; Russia	Jumber Kvelashvili; Georgia
86 kg	Artur Naifonov; Russia	Taimuraz Friev; Spain	Gheorghe Rubaev; Moldova
86 kg	Artur Naifonov; Russia	Taimuraz Friev; Spain	Denis Balaur; Moldova
92 kg	Abdulrashid Sadulaev; Russia	Irakli Mtsituri; Georgia	Serdar Böke; Turkey
92 kg	Abdulrashid Sadulaev; Russia	Irakli Mtsituri; Georgia	Nicolai Ceban; Moldova
97 kg	Vladislav Baitcaev; Russia	Rıza Yıldırım; Turkey	Murazi Mchedlidze; Ukraine
97 kg	Vladislav Baitcaev; Russia	Rıza Yıldırım; Turkey	Rasul Magomedov; Russia
125 kg	Geno Petriashvili; Georgia	Muradin Kushkhov; Russia	Aleksander Koldovski; Ukraine
125 kg	Geno Petriashvili; Georgia	Muradin Kushkhov; Russia	Ioannis Kargiotakis; Greece

=== Greco-Roman ===
Event	Gold	Silver	Bronze
55 kg	Doğuş Ayazcı; Turkey	Shota Tanokura; Japan	Hakan Murat Çankaya; Turkey
55 kg	Doğuş Ayazcı; Turkey	Shota Tanokura; Japan	Nedialko Petrov; Bulgaria
60 kg	Kenichiro Fumita; Japan	Virgil Munteanu; Romania	Kerem Kamal; Turkey
60 kg	Kenichiro Fumita; Japan	Virgil Munteanu; Romania	Ivo Iliev; Bulgaria
63 kg	Nikolay Vichev; Bulgaria	Mihai Mihuț; Romania	Donior Islamov; Moldova
63 kg	Nikolay Vichev; Bulgaria	Mihai Mihuț; Romania	Shinobu Ota; Japan
67 kg	Murat Fırat; Turkey	Denys Dem'Yankov; Ukraine	Dawid Karecinski; Poland
67 kg	Murat Fırat; Turkey	Denys Dem'Yankov; Ukraine	Elman Mukhtarov; Azerbaijan
72 kg	Rasul Chunayev; Azerbaijan	Evrik Nikoghosyan; France	Ramaz Zoidze; Georgia
72 kg	Rasul Chunayev; Azerbaijan	Evrik Nikoghosyan; France	Cengiz Arslan; Turkey
77 kg	Viktor Nemeš; Serbia	Dmitriy Petaikin; Russia	Igor Besleaga; Moldova
77 kg	Viktor Nemeš; Serbia	Dmitriy Petaikin; Russia	Yunus Emre Başar; Turkey
82 kg	Edgar Babayan; Poland	Tornike Dzamashvili; Georgia	Nicu Samuel Ojog; Romania
82 kg	Edgar Babayan; Poland	Tornike Dzamashvili; Georgia	Andrii Antoniuk; Ukraine
87 kg	Tarek Abdelsalam; Bulgaria	Evgeny Saleev; Russia	Nikolai Dobrev; Serbia
87 kg	Tarek Abdelsalam; Bulgaria	Evgeny Saleev; Russia	Kiril Milov; Bulgaria
97 kg	Süleyman Demirci; Turkey	Mikheil Kajaia; Serbia	Giorgi Melia; Georgia
97 kg	Süleyman Demirci; Turkey	Mikheil Kajaia; Serbia	Mélonin Noumonvi; France
130 kg	Rıza Kayaalp; Turkey	Zviadi Pataridze; Georgia	Alin Alexuc-Ciurariu; Romania
130 kg	Rıza Kayaalp; Turkey	Zviadi Pataridze; Georgia	Mykola Kuchmii; Ukraine

=== Women's freestyle ===
Event	Gold	Silver	Bronze
50 kg	Mariya Stadnik; Azerbaijan	Milana Dadasheva; Russia	Nadezhda Sokolova; Russia
50 kg	Mariya Stadnik; Azerbaijan	Milana Dadasheva; Russia	Anna Łukasiak; Poland
53 kg	Katarzyna Krawczyk; Poland	Ekaterina Poleshchuk; Russia	Kseniya Nezgovorova; Russia
53 kg	Katarzyna Krawczyk; Poland	Ekaterina Poleshchuk; Russia	Mercédesz Dénes; Hungary
55 kg	Roksana Zasina; Poland	Marina Sedneva; Kazakhstan	Nina Menkenova; Russia
55 kg	Roksana Zasina; Poland	Marina Sedneva; Kazakhstan	Lenka Martinakova; Czech Republic
57 kg	Emese Barka; Hungary	Olga Khoroshavtseva; Russia	Bilyana Dudova; Bulgaria
57 kg	Emese Barka; Hungary	Olga Khoroshavtseva; Russia	Mathilde Rivière; France
59 kg	Svetlana Lipatova; Russia	Mimi Hristova; Bulgaria	Elif Jale Yeşilırmak; Turkey
59 kg	Svetlana Lipatova; Russia	Mimi Hristova; Bulgaria	Marwa Amri; Tunisia
62 kg	Taybe Yusein; Bulgaria	Soronzonboldyn Battsetseg; Mongolia	Tatiana Smoliak; Russia
62 kg	Taybe Yusein; Bulgaria	Soronzonboldyn Battsetseg; Mongolia	Luzie Manzke; Germany
65 kg	Adéla Hanzlíčková; Czech Republic	Svetlana Babushkina; Russia	Elis Manolova; Azerbaijan
65 kg	Adéla Hanzlíčková; Czech Republic	Svetlana Babushkina; Russia	Valeria Suvorova; Russia
69 kg	Buse Tosun; Turkey	Anastasia Bratchikova; Russia	Laura Skujiņa; Latvia
69 kg	Buse Tosun; Turkey	Anastasia Bratchikova; Russia	Sofiya Georgieva; Bulgaria
72 kg	Agnieszka Wieszczek; Poland	Cynthia Vescan; France	Signe Marie Store; Norway
72 kg	Agnieszka Wieszczek; Poland	Cynthia Vescan; France	Burcu Örskaya Üğdüler; Turkey
76 kg	Aline Rotter-Focken; Germany	Ekaterina Bukina; Russia	Gulmaral Yerkebayeva; Kazakhstan
76 kg	Aline Rotter-Focken; Germany	Ekaterina Bukina; Russia	Svetlana Saenko; Moldova

== Participating nations ==
464 competitors from 33 nations participated.

- Austria (6)
- Azerbaijan (4)
- Belarus (4)
- Bulgaria (66)
- Czech Republic (2)
- Egypt (1)
- Spain (15)
- Finland (1)
- France (17)
- Georgia (24)
- Germany (9)
- Greece (14)
- Hungary (7)
- Italy (16)
- Japan (28)
- Kazakhstan (8)
- South Korea (7)
- Latvia (1)
- Macedonia (6)
- Moldova (19)
- Mongolia (1)
- Norway (5)
- Peru (4)
- Poland (22)
- Romania (18)
- Russia (46)
- Serbia (13)
- Switzerland (1)
- Slovakia (6)
- Tunisia (1)
- Turkey (57)
- Ukraine (30)
- United States (5)
