= 2016 European Wrestling Championships – Men's Greco-Roman 75 kg =

The men's Greco-Roman 75 kg is a competition featured at the 2016 European Wrestling Championships, and was held in Riga, Latvia on March 13.

== Medalists ==
Gold	Zurab Datunashvili; Georgia
Silver	Viktor Nemeš; Serbia
Bronze	László Szabó; Hungary
Bronze	Karapet Chalyan; Armenia

== Results ==
Legend

- F — Won by fall

=== Final ===
Final
Zurab Datunashvili (GEO)	2
Viktor Nemeš (SRB)	2

=== Top half ===
==== Section 1 ====
Qualification
Robert Rosengren (SWE)	2
László Szabó (HUN)	5

Round of 16
Jure Kuhar (SLO)	7
Igor Besleaga (MDA)	2
Neven Zugaj (CRO)	10
Georgios Prevolarakis (GRE)	2
Viktor Nemeš (SRB)	6
Ilie Cojocari (ROM)	0
Silver Togen (EST)	0
László Szabó (HUN)	8

Quarterfinals
Jure Kuhar (SLO)	0
Neven Zugaj (CRO)	2
Viktor Nemeš (SRB)	3
László Szabó (HUN)	0

Semifinals
Neven Zugaj (CRO)	3
Viktor Nemeš (SRB)	3

=== Bottom half ===
==== Section 2 ====
Qualification
Pavel Powada (GEO)	2
Iliyan Georgiev (BUL)	5
Karapet Chalyan (ARM)	7
Jan Rotter (GER)	6
Dmytro Arabadzhy (UKR)	0
Emrah Kuş (TUR)	9
Zurab Datunashvili (GEO)	8
Evrik Nikoghosyan (FRA)	0
Ciro Russo (ITA)	0
Aliaksandr Dzemyanovich (BLR)	8
Miguel Salvador Miguez (ESP)	0
Tobias Johansen (NOR)	4^{F}
Elvin Mursaliyev (AZE)	8
Jevgenijs Kolcovs (LAT)	0
Arkadiusz Kułynycz (POL)	3
Chingiz Labazanov (RUS)	5

Round of 16
Iliyan Georgiev (BUL)	5
Karapet Chalyan (ARM)	10
Emrah Kuş (TUR)	3
Zurab Datunashvili (GEO)	3
Aliaksandr Dzemyanovich (BLR)	8
Tobias Johansen (NOR)	0
Elvin Mursaliyev (AZE)	5
Chingiz Labazanov (RUS)	2

Quarterfinals
Karapet Chalyan (ARM)	0
Zurab Datunashvili (GEO)	8
Aliaksandr Dzemyanovich (BLR)	6
Elvin Mursaliyev (AZE)	9

Semifinals
Zurab Datunashvili (GEO)	3
Elvin Mursaliyev (AZE)	1

=== Repechage ===
Repechage round 1
Evrik Nikoghosyan (FRA)	0
Emrah Kuş (TUR)	6

Repechage round 2
Ilie Cojocari (ROM)	0
László Szabó (HUN)	9
Emrah Kuş (TUR)	0
Karapet Chalyan (ARM)	8

Bronze medals
László Szabó (HUN)	4
Neven Zugaj (CRO)	2
Karapet Chalyan (ARM)	4
Elvin Mursaliyev (AZE)	1
