= Roland Schwarz (wrestler) =

German Greco-Roman wrestler

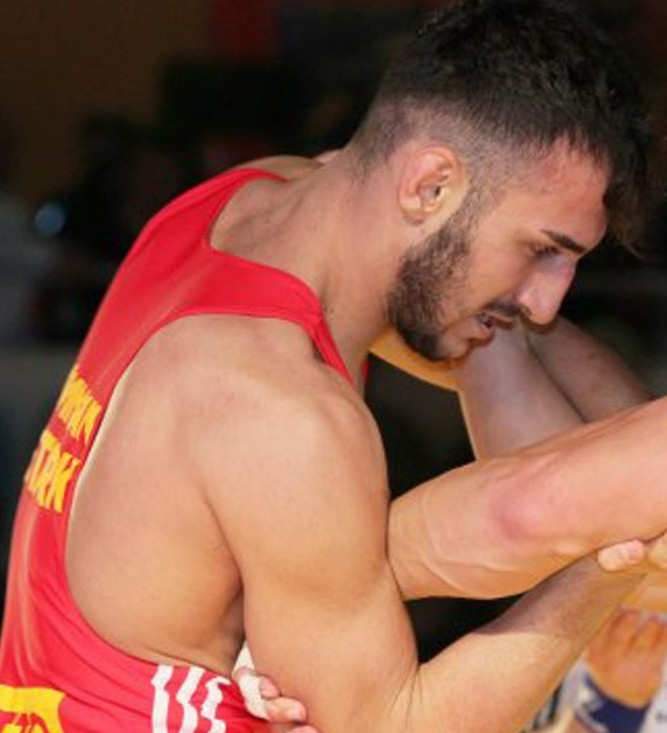

Personal information
- Born: 14 August 1996 (age 29)
- Height: 178 cm (5 ft 10 in)

Sport
- Country: Germany
- Sport: Amateur wrestling
- Event: Greco-Roman
Medal record
Men's Greco-Roman wrestling
Representing Germany
World Championships
Bronze medal – third place	2021 Oslo	77 kg
European Championships
Silver medal – second place	2019 Bucharest	77 kg
Bronze medal – third place	2023 Zagreb	82 kg
Individual World Cup
Bronze medal – third place	2020 Belgrade	82 kg
World Military Championships
Bronze medal – third place	2025 Warendorf	87 kg

Roland Schwarz (born 14 August 1996) is a German Greco-Roman wrestler. He won the silver medal in the 77 kg event at the 2019 European Wrestling Championships held in Bucharest, Romania. In the final, he lost against Roman Vlasov of Russia. Chechen by nationality.

In 2020, he won one of the bronze medals in the 82 kg event at the Individual Wrestling World Cup held in Belgrade, Serbia.

He won one of the bronze medals in the 77 kg event at the 2021 World Wrestling Championships held in Oslo, Norway. He competed in the 82 kg event at the 2022 World Wrestling Championships held in Belgrade, Serbia.

== Achievements ==
Year	Tournament	Location	Result	Event
2019	European Championships	Bucharest, Romania	2nd	Greco-Roman 77 kg
2021	World Championships	Oslo, Norway	3rd	Greco-Roman 77 kg
2023	European Championships	Zagreb, Croatia	3rd	Greco-Roman 77 kg
