= 2022 World Wrestling Championships – Men's Greco-Roman 77 kg =

Wrestling competitions

Men's Greco-Roman 77 kg at the 2022 World Championships
- Venue: Štark Arena
- Dates: 10–19 September 2022
- Competitors: 33 from 33 nations

Medalists
| gold medal | Akzhol Makhmudov | Kyrgyzstan |
| silver medal | Zoltán Lévai | Hungary |
| bronze medal | Malkhas Amoyan | Armenia |
| bronze medal | Yunus Emre Başar | Turkey |

The men's Greco-Roman 77 kilograms is a competition featured at the 2022 World Wrestling Championships, and was held in Belgrade, Serbia on 10 and 11 September 2022.

== Results ==
Legend

- WO — Won by walkover

=== Finals ===
| Semifinals | | Final |
| Zoltán Lévai (HUN) | 3 |
| Viktor Nemeš (SRB) | 1 | Zoltán Lévai (HUN) | 0 |
| Akzhol Makhmudov (KGZ) | 4 | Akzhol Makhmudov (KGZ) | 8 |
| Kim Hyeon-woo (KOR) | 1 |

=== Top half ===
==== Section 1 ====
Round of 64
Malkhas Amoyan (ARM) | 3
Zoltán Lévai (HUN) | 3

Round of 32
Sanan Suleymanov (AZE) | 7
Idris Ibaev (GER) | 8
Per-Anders Kure (NOR) | 3
Tamerlan Shadukayev (KAZ) | 8
Zoltán Lévai (HUN) | 4
Iuri Lomadze (GEO) | 1
Albin Olofsson (SWE) | 5
Aik Mnatsakanian (BUL) | 1

Round of 16
Idris Ibaev (GER) | 2
Tamerlan Shadukayev (KAZ) | 11
Zoltán Lévai (HUN) | 3
Albin Olofsson (SWE) | 1

Quarterfinals
Tamerlan Shadukayev (KAZ) | 0
Zoltán Lévai (HUN) | 9

==== Section 2 ====
Round of 64

Round of 32
Shohei Yabiku (JPN) | 4
Oliver Krüger (DEN) | 3
Paulius Galkinas (LTU) | 3
Liu Rui (CHN) | 14
Yasaf Zeinalov (UKR) | 8
Rohan Kalisch (AUS) | 0
Kamal Bey (USA) | 0
Viktor Nemeš (SRB) | 4

Round of 16
Shohei Yabiku (JPN) | 5
Liu Rui (CHN) | 6
Yasaf Zeinalov (UKR) | 2
Viktor Nemeš (SRB) | 6

Quarterfinals
Liu Rui (CHN) | 0
Viktor Nemeš (SRB) | 7

=== Bottom half ===
==== Section 3 ====
Round of 64

Round of 32
Akzhol Makhmudov (KGZ) | 11
Joílson Júnior (BRA) | 1
Riccardo Abbrescia (ITA) | 2
Emmanuel Benítez (MEX) | 4
Oldřich Varga (CZE) | 3
Fabio Dietsche (SUI) | 1
David Choc (GUA) | 1
Yunus Emre Başar (TUR) | 5

Round of 16
Akzhol Makhmudov (KGZ) | 8
Emmanuel Benítez (MEX) | 0
Oldřich Varga (CZE) | 1
Yunus Emre Başar (TUR) | 5

Quarterfinals
Akzhol Makhmudov (KGZ) | 9
Yunus Emre Başar (TUR) | 7

==== Section 4 ====
Round of 64

Round of 32
Yosvanys Peña (CUB) | 5
Georgios Prevolarakis (GRE) | 7
Aram Vardanyan (UZB) | 8
Sachin (IND) | 0
Kim Hyeon-woo (KOR) | 1
Johnny Bur (FRA) | 1
Antonio Kamenjašević (CRO) | 4
Mohammad Ali Geraei (IRI) | 5

Round of 16
Georgios Prevolarakis (GRE) | 2
Aram Vardanyan (UZB) | 12
Kim Hyeon-woo (KOR) | 6
Mohammad Ali Geraei (IRI) | 1

Quarterfinals
Aram Vardanyan (UZB) | 0
Kim Hyeon-woo (KOR) | 6

=== Repechage ===
Repechage round 1
Malkhas Amoyan (ARM) | WO
Iuri Lomadze (GEO)

Repechage round 2
Malkhas Amoyan (ARM) | 5
Albin Olofsson (SWE) | 2
Joílson Júnior (BRA) | 3
Emmanuel Benítez (MEX) | 3

Repechage round 3
Malkhas Amoyan (ARM) | 2
Tamerlan Shadukayev (KAZ) | 2
Joílson Júnior (BRA) | 0
Yunus Emre Başar (TUR) | 8

Bronze medals
Malkhas Amoyan (ARM) | 7
Viktor Nemeš (SRB) | 1
Yunus Emre Başar (TUR) | 4
Kim Hyeon-woo (KOR) | 1

== Final standing ==
| Rank | Athlete |
|---|---|
| 1st place, gold medalist(s) | Akzhol Makhmudov (KGZ) |
| 2nd place, silver medalist(s) | Zoltán Lévai (HUN) |
| 3rd place, bronze medalist(s) | Malkhas Amoyan (ARM) |
| 3rd place, bronze medalist(s) | Yunus Emre Başar (TUR) |
| 5 | Viktor Nemeš (SRB) |
| 5 | Kim Hyeon-woo (KOR) |
| 7 | Aram Vardanyan (UZB) |
| 8 | Tamerlan Shadukayev (KAZ) |
| 9 | Liu Rui (CHN) |
| 10 | Yasaf Zeinalov (UKR) |
| 11 | Albin Olofsson (SWE) |
| 12 | Idris Ibaev (GER) |
| 13 | Shohei Yabiku (JPN) |
| 14 | Georgios Prevolarakis (GRE) |
| 15 | Emmanuel Benítez (MEX) |
| 16 | Mohammad Ali Geraei (IRI) |
| 17 | Oldřich Varga (CZE) |
| 18 | Joílson Júnior (BRA) |
| 19 | Sanan Suleymanov (AZE) |
| 20 | Yosvanys Peña (CUB) |
| 21 | Antonio Kamenjašević (CRO) |
| 22 | Oliver Krüger (DEN) |
| 23 | Per-Anders Kure (NOR) |
| 24 | Paulius Galkinas (LTU) |
| 25 | Riccardo Abbrescia (ITA) |
| 26 | Johnny Bur (FRA) |
| 27 | Fabio Dietsche (SUI) |
| 28 | Iuri Lomadze (GEO) |
| 29 | Aik Mnatsakanian (BUL) |
| 30 | David Choc (GUA) |
| 31 | Kamal Bey (USA) |
| 32 | Rohan Kalisch (AUS) |
| 33 | Sachin (IND) |
