= 2021 European Wrestling Championships – Men's Greco-Roman 130 kg =

Wrestling competition

The Men's Greco-Roman 130 kg is a competition featured at the 2021 European Wrestling Championships, and was held in Warsaw, Poland on April 23 and April 24.

== Medalists ==
Gold	Rıza Kayaalp; Turkey
Silver	Iakob Kajaia; Georgia
Bronze	Zurabi Gedekhauri; Russia
Bronze	Eduard Popp; Germany

== Results ==
Legend

- F — Won by fall

Round of 16
Štěpán David (CZE)	0
Iakob Kajaia (GEO)	9
Eduard Popp (GER)	4
Rafał Krajewski (POL)	3
Marko Koščević (CRO)	9
Pavel Rudakou (BLR)	0
Oleksandr Chernetskyi (UKR)	1
Rıza Kayaalp (TUR)	10
Alexandros Papadatos (GRE)	0
Alin Alexuc-Ciurariu (ROU)	9

Quarterfinals
Konsta Mäenpää (FIN)	1
Romas Fridrikas (LTU)	4
Zurabi Gedekhauri (RUS)	1
Iakob Kajaia (GEO)	3
Eduard Popp (GER)	6
Marko Koščević (CRO)	0
Rıza Kayaalp (TUR)	8
Alin Alexuc-Ciurariu (ROU)	0

Semifinals
Romas Fridrikas (LTU)	0
Iakob Kajaia (GEO)	9
Eduard Popp (GER)	0
Rıza Kayaalp (TUR)	5^{F}

Final
Iakob Kajaia (GEO)	1
Rıza Kayaalp (TUR)	3

Repechage round 1
Štěpán David (CZE)	1
Zurabi Gedekhauri (RUS)	9
Oleksandr Chernetskyi (UKR)	6
Alin Alexuc-Ciurariu (ROU)	2

Bronze medal match
Zurabi Gedekhauri (RUS)	3
Romas Fridrikas (LTU)	2
Oleksandr Chernetskyi (UKR)	1
Eduard Popp (GER)	2

== Final standing ==
Rank	Athlete
1st place, gold medalist(s)	Rıza Kayaalp (TUR)
2nd place, silver medalist(s)	Iakob Kajaia (GEO)
3rd place, bronze medalist(s)	Zurabi Gedekhauri (RUS)
3rd place, bronze medalist(s)	Eduard Popp (GER)
5	Romas Fridrikas (LTU)
5	Oleksandr Chernetskyi (UKR)
7	Alin Alexuc-Ciurariu (ROU)
8	Marko Koščević (CRO)
9	Rafał Krajewski (POL)
10	Konsta Mäenpää (FIN)
11	Štěpán David (CZE)
12	Pavel Rudakou (BLR)
13	Alexandros Papadatos (GRE)
