= 2015 Grand Prix Zagreb Open =

- Host city: Zagreb, Croatia
- Dates: 21–22 February 2015
- Stadium: Dom Sportova

The 2015 Grand Prix Zagreb Open, was a wrestling event held in Zagreb, Croatia between 21–22 February 2015.

== Medal table ==
| Rank | Nation | Gold | Silver | Bronze | Total |
|---|---|---|---|---|---|
| 1 | Belarus | 4 | 2 | 1 | 7 |
| 2 | Croatia | 2 | 3 | 0 | 5 |
| 3 | United States | 1 | 0 | 4 | 5 |
| 4 | Hungary | 1 | 0 | 3 | 4 |
| 5 | Serbia | 0 | 1 | 3 | 4 |
| 6 | Israel | 0 | 1 | 0 | 1 |
| 6 | Slovenia | 0 | 1 | 0 | 1 |
| 8 | Ukraine | 0 | 0 | 2 | 2 |
| 9 | Austria | 0 | 0 | 1 | 1 |
| 9 | France | 0 | 0 | 1 | 1 |
| 9 | Tunisia | 0 | 0 | 1 | 1 |
| Totals (11 entries) | | 8 | 8 | 16 | 32 |

== Team ranking ==
| Rank | Men's Greco-Roman | |
| Rank | Team | Points |
|---|---|---|
| 1 | Croatia | 77 |
| 2 | Belarus | 66 |
| 3 | Serbia | 61 |
| 4 | United States | 54 |
| 5 | Hungary | 47 |

== Greco-Roman ==
| Event | Gold | Silver | Bronze |
|---|---|---|---|
| 59 kg | Maksim Kazharski; Belarus | Ivan Lizatović; Croatia | Ryan Mango; United States |
| 59 kg | Maksim Kazharski; Belarus | Ivan Lizatović; Croatia | Csongor Knipli; Hungary |
| 66 kg | Dominik Etlinger; Croatia | Mikhail Siamionau; Belarus | Istvan Kozak; Hungary |
| 66 kg | Dominik Etlinger; Croatia | Mikhail Siamionau; Belarus | Artak Margaryan; France |
| 71 kg | Zoltan Levai; Hungary | Aleksandar Maksimović; Serbia | Trabelsi Hakim; Tunisia |
| 71 kg | Zoltan Levai; Hungary | Aleksandar Maksimović; Serbia | Mason Manville; United States |
| 75 kg | Božo Starčević; Croatia | Jure Kuhar; Slovenia | Geordan Speiller; United States |
| 75 kg | Božo Starčević; Croatia | Jure Kuhar; Slovenia | Valery Palenski; Belarus |
| 80 kg | Josef Rau; United States | Viktar Sasunouski; Belarus | Oleksii Chekalenko; Ukraine |
| 80 kg | Josef Rau; United States | Viktar Sasunouski; Belarus | Viktor Nemeš; Serbia |
| 85 kg | Javid Hamzatov; Belarus | Nenad Žugaj; Croatia | Oleksandr Shyshman; Ukraine |
| 85 kg | Javid Hamzatov; Belarus | Nenad Žugaj; Croatia | Vladimir Stankić; Serbia |
| 98 kg | Aleksander Hrabovik; Belarus | Robert Avanesyan; Israel | Daniel Gastl; Austria |
| 98 kg | Aleksander Hrabovik; Belarus | Robert Avanesyan; Israel | Adam Varga; Hungary |
| 130 kg | oseb Chugoshvili; Belarus | Stjepan Lavrić; Croatia | Nemanja Pavlović; Serbia |
| 130 kg | oseb Chugoshvili; Belarus | Stjepan Lavrić; Croatia | David Arendt; United States |

== Participating nations ==
- Austria
- Belarus
- Croatia
- Czech Republic
- France
- Hungary
- Israel
- Italy
- Serbia
- Slovakia
- Slovenia
- Tunisia
- Ukraine
- United States
