= Mason Manville =

American wrestler (born 1997)

Personal information
- Full name: Mason Tyler Manville
- Born: May 6, 1997 (age 29) Fort Bragg, North Carolina, U.S.
- Home town: Lorton, Virginia, U.S.

Sport
- Country: United States
- Sport: Wrestling
- Events: Greco-Roman, Freestyle and Folkstyle
- College team: Penn State
- Club: U.S. Army WCAP, Nittany Lion Wrestling Club
- Team: USA
- Coached by: Matt Lindland, Shon Lewis, Cael Sanderson
Medal record
Representing the United States
Men's Greco-Roman wrestling
Grand Prix
Bronze medal – third place	2015 Zagreb	71 kg
Dave Schultz Memorial International
Silver medal – second place	2019 Colorado Springs	77 kg
Men's freestyle wrestling
Cadet World Championships
Gold medal – first place	2014 Snina	69 kg

Mason Tyler Manville (born May 5, 1997) is an American former Greco-Roman, freestyle, and folkstyle wrestler. He represented the United States on the Senior level in Greco-Roman wrestling at 75 kg, at the 2017 World Championships. Manville attended college and wrestled collegiately at Penn State.

== Early life ==
A Virginia native, Manville moved his eighth-grade year to Apple Valley, Minnesota, to wrestle for Apple Valley High School. He would then attend Blair Academy in Blairstown, New Jersey his freshman through junior years, before attending Wyoming Seminary in Kingston, Pennsylvania his senior year. Manville's wrestling accomplishments in high school included winning a Cadet freestyle World title, being a three-time prep state champion, two-time prep national champion, winning double Fargo titles, Beast of the East, Walsh Ironman, and Super 32.

== College ==
Manville wrestled collegiately at Penn State, where he competed at 165 and 174-pounds. Manville was a history major while at Penn State.

== Greco-Roman wrestling ==
In 2017, Manville captured the United States Senior level World Team 75 kg spot in Greco-Roman wrestling, with back-to-back wins over Kamal Bey in the wrestle-off. Manville finished 16th at 75 kg at the 2017 Greco-Roman World Championships held in Paris, France.
