= Mohammadali Geraei =

Iranian Greco-Roman wrestler

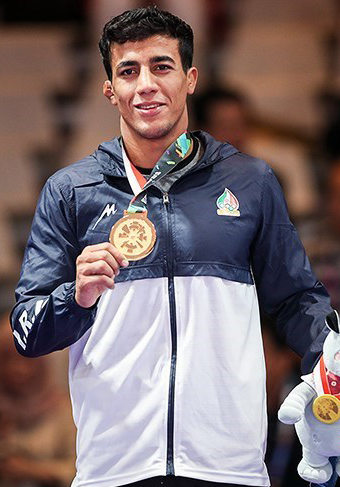
- Geraei at the 2018 Asian Games

Personal information
- Full name: Mohammad Ali Geraei
- Nickname: The Falcon
- Nationality: Iranian
- Born: 2 May 1994 (age 32) Shiraz, Iran
- Height: 180 cm (5 ft 11 in)

Sport
- Country: Iran
- Sport: Greco-Roman wrestling
- Weight class: 77 kg
Medal record
Men's Greco-Roman wrestling
Representing Iran
World Championships
Gold medal – first place	2024 Tirana	82 kg
Bronze medal – third place	2017 Paris	71 kg
Bronze medal – third place	2019 Nur-Sultan	77 kg
Bronze medal – third place	2021 Oslo	77 kg
Asian Games
Gold medal – first place	2018 Jakarta	77 kg
Asian Championships
Silver medal – second place	2015 Doha	66 kg
Silver medal – second place	2018 Bishkek	77 kg
Bronze medal – third place	2019 Xi'an	77 kg
Islamic Solidarity Games
Gold medal – first place	2017 Baku	71 kg
Military World Games
Gold medal – first place	2015 Mungyeong	71 kg

Mohammad Ali Geraei (Persian: محمدعلی گرایی; born 2 May 1994) is a Greco-Roman wrestler from Iran. He won a gold medal at the 2018 Asian Games and a bronze medal at the 2017, 2019 and 2021 World Championships.

He competed in the 77 kg event at the 2022 World Wrestling Championships held in Belgrade, Serbia.

His brother Mohammad Reza Geraei also competes in the Greco-Roman wrestling.

During the 2025–2026 Iranian protests, Geraei publicly opposed the Iranian government's internet blackouts in response to the protests.
