= Tamás Lőrincz =

Hungarian wrestler (born 1986)

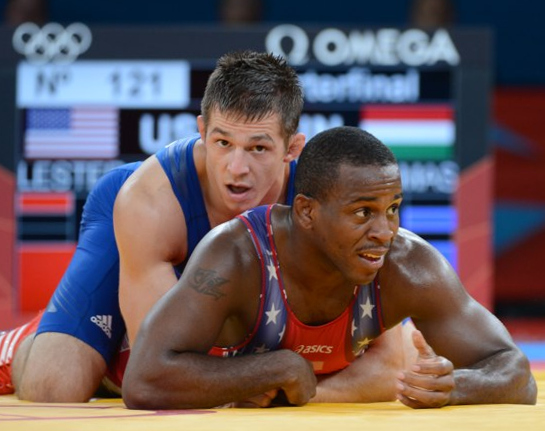
- Lőrincz (left) vs Justin Lester at the 2012 Summer Olympics

Personal information
- Born: 20 December 1986 (age 39) Cegléd, Hungary
- Height: 1.73 m (5 ft 8 in)
- Weight: 66 kg (146 lb)

Sport
- Sport: Wrestling
- Event: Greco-Roman
- Club: Ceglédi VSE ( –2017); Bp. Honvéd (2018– )
- Coached by: Ferenc Pap, Ferenc Takács, István Majoros (2018– )

Achievements and titles
- Olympic finals: 2008, 2012, 2016, 2020
Medal record
Men's Greco-Roman wrestling
Representing Hungary
Event	1st	2nd	3rd
Olympic Games	1	1	0
World Championships	1	2	1
European Championships	4	1	3
European Games	0	0	1
Total	6	4	5
Olympic Games
Gold medal – first place	2020 Tokyo	77 kg
Silver medal – second place	2012 London	66 kg
World Championships
Gold medal – first place	2019 Nur-Sultan	77 kg
Silver medal – second place	2017 Paris	75 kg
Silver medal – second place	2018 Budapest	77 kg
Bronze medal – third place	2014 Tashkent	66 kg
European Games
Bronze medal – third place	2019 Minsk	77 kg
European Championships
Gold medal – first place	2006 Moscow	66 kg
Gold medal – first place	2013 Tbilisi	66 kg
Gold medal – first place	2014 Vantaa	71 kg
Gold medal – first place	2021 Warwaw	77 kg
Silver medal – second place	2011 Dortmund	66 kg
Bronze medal – third place	2010 Baku	66 kg
Bronze medal – third place	2017 Novi Sad	75 kg
Bronze medal – third place	2018 Kaspiysk	77 kg

Tamás Lőrincz (born 20 December 1986) is a Hungarian wrestler. He won the silver medal at the 2012 Summer Olympics in the Greco-Roman 66 kg event and a gold medal in the men's 77 kg event at the 2020 Summer Olympics held in Tokyo, Japan.
