= Fatih Cengiz =

Turkish Greco-Roman wrestler

Personal information
- Born: 26 September 1995 (age 30)
- Height: 170 cm (5 ft 7 in)

Sport
- Country: Turkey
- Sport: Amateur wrestling
- Event: Greco-Roman
- Club: Istanbul BB SK
Medal record
Men's Greco-Roman wrestling
Representing Turkey
World Championships
| Bronze medal – third place | 2017 Paris | 75 kg |
World U23 Championships
| Gold medal – first place | 2017 Bydgoszcz | 75 kg |
| Bronze medal – third place | 2018 Bucharest | 77 kg |
European U23 Championship
| Bronze medal – third place | 2018 Istanbul | 77 kg |
World University Championship
| Gold medal – first place | 2018 Goiana | 77 kg |
Vehbi Emre & Hamit Kaplan Tournament
| Gold medal – first place | 2019 Istanbul | 77 kg |
| Gold medal – first place | 2018 Istanbul | 77 kg |
| Gold medal – first place | 2017 Istanbul | 75 kg |

Fatih Cengiz (born 26 September 1995) is a Turkish Greco-Roman wrestler. He was awarded one of the bronze medals in the 75 kg event at the 2017 World Wrestling Championships after Aleksandr Chekhirkin tested positive for doping.

He is a member of İstanbul Büyükşehir Belediyesi S.K.

== Career ==
In 2018, he won one of the bronze medals in the men's 77 kg event at the European U23 Wrestling Championship held in Istanbul, Turkey.

In 2019, he lost his bronze medal match against Viktor Nemeš in the 77 kg event at the European Wrestling Championships held in Bucharest, Romania. In March 2021, he competed at the European Qualification Tournament in Budapest, Hungary hoping to qualify for the 2020 Summer Olympics in Tokyo, Japan. He was eliminated in his first match by Aik Mnatsakanian of Bulgaria.

== Major results ==
| Year | Tournament | Location | Result | Event |
|---|---|---|---|---|
| 2017 | World Championships | Paris, France | 3rd | Greco-Roman 75 kg |
