= 2023 European Wrestling Championships – Men's Greco-Roman 77 kg =

Wrestling competition

Men's Greco-Roman 77 kg at the 2023 European Wrestling Championships
- Venue: Arena Zagreb
- Location: Zagreb, Croatia
- Dates: 21-22 April
- Competitors: 23

Medalists
gold medal	Malkhas Amoyan	Armenia
silver medal	Viktor Nemeš	Serbia
bronze medal	Zoltán Lévai	Hungary
bronze medal	Yunus Emre Başar	Turkey

The Men's Greco-Roman 77 kg is a competition featured at the 2023 European Wrestling Championships, and was held in Zagreb, Croatia on April 21 and 22.

== Results ==
Legend

- F — Won by fall
- R — Retired

=== Final ===
Final
Viktor Nemeš (SRB)	4
Malkhas Amoyan (ARM)	6

=== Top half ===
Round of 32
Luca Dariozzi (ITA)	0
Iuri Lomadze (GEO)	9
Mikko Peltokangas (FIN)	6
Sebastian Aak (NOR)	12
Paulius Galkinas (LTU)	5
Christos Koutsouridis (GRE)	2

Round of 16
Zoltán Lévai (HUN)	9
Sanan Suleymanov (AZE)	0
Iuri Lomadze (GEO)	10
Marcos Sánchez-Silva (ESP)	0
Alexandrin Guțu (MDA)	14
Sebastian Aak (NOR)	8
Paulius Galkinas (LTU)	1
Viktor Nemeš (SRB)	5

Quarterfinals
Zoltán Lévai (HUN)	3
Iuri Lomadze (GEO)	1
Alexandrin Guțu (MDA)	1
Viktor Nemeš (SRB)	6

Semifinals
Zoltán Lévai (HUN)	1
Viktor Nemeš (SRB)	1

=== Bottom half ===
Round of 32
Antonio Kamenjašević (CRO)	0
Albin Olofsson (SWE)	1^{R}
Denis Horváth (SVK)	1
Oliver Krüger (DEN)	7
Aik Mnatsakanian (BUL)	8
Kevin Kupi (ALB)	0
Serhii Kozub (UKR)	0
Samuel Bellscheidt (GER)	9

Round of 16
Malkhas Amoyan (ARM)	10
Antonio Kamenjašević (CRO)	0
Oliver Krüger (DEN)	2
Johnny Bur (FRA)	0
Patryk Bednarz (POL)	1
Aik Mnatsakanian (BUL)	1
Samuel Bellscheidt (GER)	1
Yunus Emre Başar (TUR)	3

Quarterfinals
Malkhas Amoyan (ARM)	7^{F}
Oliver Krüger (DEN)	0
Aik Mnatsakanian (BUL)	1
Yunus Emre Başar (TUR)	6

Semifinals
Malkhas Amoyan (ARM)	6
Yunus Emre Başar (TUR)	1

Repechage round 2
Paulius Galkinas (LTU)	0
Alexandrin Guțu (MDA)	11
Antonio Kamenjašević (CRO)	5
Oliver Krüger (DEN)	5

Bronze medal match
Alexandrin Guțu (MDA)
Zoltán Lévai (HUN)	WO
Oliver Krüger (DEN)	0
Yunus Emre Başar (TUR)	8

== Final standing ==
Rank	Athlete
1st place, gold medalist(s)	Malkhas Amoyan (ARM)
2nd place, silver medalist(s)	Viktor Nemeš (SRB)
3rd place, bronze medalist(s)	Zoltán Lévai (HUN)
3rd place, bronze medalist(s)	Yunus Emre Başar (TUR)
5	Alexandrin Guțu (MDA)
5	Oliver Krüger (DEN)
7	Iuri Lomadze (GEO)
8	Aik Mnatsakanian (BUL)
9	Antonio Kamenjašević (CRO)
10	Samuel Bellscheidt (GER)
11	Sebastian Aak (NOR)
12	Paulius Galkinas (LTU)
13	Mikko Peltokangas (FIN)
14	Christos Koutsouridis (GRE)
15	Patryk Bednarz (POL)
16	Denis Horváth (SVK)
17	Albin Olofsson (SWE)
18	Johnny Bur (FRA)
19	Kevin Kupi (ALB)
20	Sanan Suleymanov (AZE)
21	Luca Dariozzi (ITA)
22	Serhii Kozub (UKR)
23	Marcos Sánchez-Silva (ESP)
