= Indira Moores =

Canadian wrestler

Indira Moores is a Canadian wrestler.

== Biography ==
Moores' hometown is Whitefish, Ontario. She attended Lo-Ellen Park Secondary School, where she was coached by Andy Lalonde. Moores was named Ontario University Athletics first team all-star (2015, 2016) and was a Canadian Interuniversity Sport (CIS) gold medalist (2015) and silver medalist (2016). Moores measured 5 foot 2 inches in her junior year and 5 foot 5 inches in her senior year.

Moores won the bronze medal at the Pan American championships in 2015, won the academic World Cup in 2018, and was part of the team taking Brock Badgers to double Canadian national victory (men's and women's) in 2018. Later that year Moores was a member of the Canadian team that won gold in the World University Wrestling Championships in Brazil.
