= Yunus Emre Başar =

Turkish Greco-Roman wrestler (born 1995)

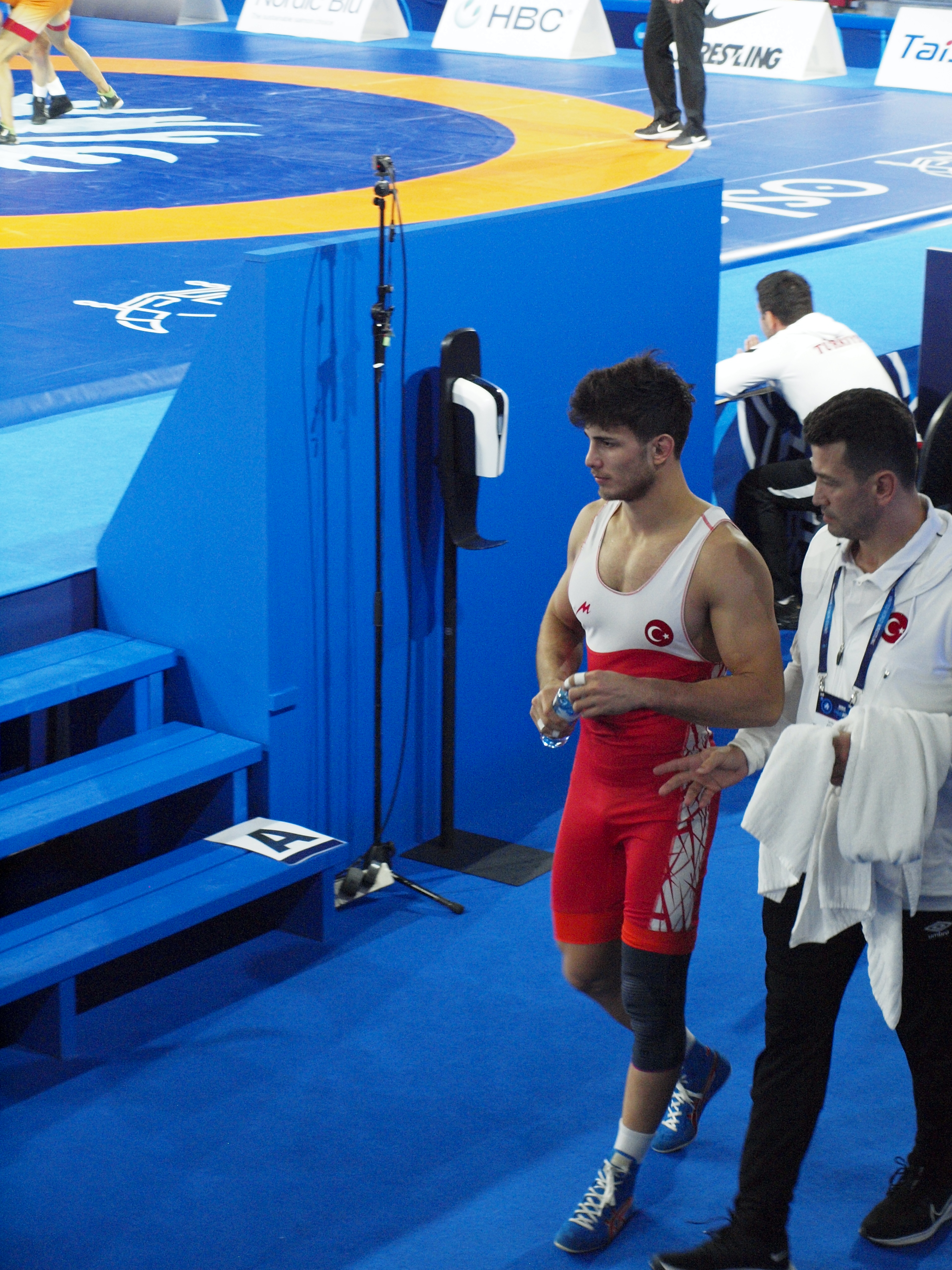
- Başar at the 2021 World Wrestling Championships

Personal information
- Born: November 5, 1995 (age 31) Sakarya, Turkey
- Height: 1.78 m (5 ft 10 in)
- Weight: 77 kg (170 lb; 12.1 st)

Sport
- Country: Turkey
- Sport: Amateur wrestling
- Event: Greco-Roman
- Team: Istanbul BB SK
Medal record
Men's Greco-Roman wrestling
Representing Turkey
World Championships
Bronze medal – third place	2022 Belgrade	77 kg
European Championships
Silver medal – second place	2021 Warsaw	77 kg
Silver medal – second place	2022 Budapest	77 kg
Silver medal – second place	2024 Bucharest	77 kg
Bronze medal – third place	2023 Zagreb	77 kg
Mediterranean Games
Gold medal – first place	2018 Tarragona	77 kg
Gold medal – first place	2026 Taranto	77 kg
World Military Championships
Bronze medal – third place	2024 Yerevan	77 kg
Vehbi Emre & Hamit Kaplan Tournament
Gold medal – first place	2016 Istanbul	71 kg
Gold medal – first place	2022 Istanbul	77 kg
Gold medal – first place	2025 Kocaeli	77 kg
Bronze medal – third place	2018 Istanbul	77 kg
Dan Kolov - Nikola Petrov Tournament
Bronze medal – third place	2017 Ruse	77 kg
Bronze medal – third place	2018 Sofia	77 kg
Bronze medal – third place	2026 Plovdiv	77 kg
Grand Prix
Silver medal – second place	2014 Dortmund	71 kg
Silver medal – second place	2019 Zagreb	77 kg
Silver medal – second place	2021 Nice	77 kg
Silver medal – second place	2021 Rome	77 kg
Bronze medal – third place	2023 Alexandria	77 kg
European U23 Championships
Gold medal – first place	2016 Ruse	71 kg
European Cadets Championships
Gold medal – first place	2012 Katowice	69 kg

Yunus Emre Basar (born November 5, 1995) competing in the 77 kg division of Greco-Roman wrestling. He won one of the bronze medals in the 77 kg event at the 2022 World Wrestling Championships held in Belgrade, Serbia. He is a member of the İstanbul Büyükşehir Belediyesi S.K.

== Career ==
Turkey's Yunus Emre Basar earned a silver medal at the 2021 European Wrestling Championships.

In 2022, he won the gold medal in his event at the Vehbi Emre & Hamit Kaplan Tournament held in Istanbul, Turkey.

In 2023, he won one of the bronze medals in the men's 77 kg event at the 2023 European Wrestling Championships held in Zagreb, Croatia. Starting the championship from the qualifying round, Yunus Emre Başar defeated German Samuel Bellscheidt 3-1 and reached the quarterfinals. In the quarterfinals, he defeated Bulgarian Aik Mnatsakanian 6-1 and advanced to the semifinals. In the semifinals, he defeated his Armenian opponent Malkhas Amoyan 6-1 and reached the bronze medal match. In the bronze medal match, Başar defeated Danish Oliver Marco Krueger 8–0 with technical superiority and won the bronze medal.

He won the silver medal in the 77 kg event at the 2024 European Wrestling Championships held in Bucharest, Romania.

== Achievements ==
Year	Tournament	Location	Result	Event
2018	Mediterranean Games	Tarragona, Spain	1st	Greco-Roman 77 kg
2021	European Championships	Warsaw, Poland	2nd	Greco-Roman 77 kg
2022	European Championships	Budapest, Hungary	2nd	Greco-Roman 77 kg
2022	World Championships	Belgrade, Serbia	3rd	Greco-Roman 77 kg
2023	European Championships	Zagreb, Croatia	3rd	Greco-Roman 77 kg
2024	European Championships	Bucharest, Romania	2nd	Greco-Roman 77 kg
