= Shohei Yabiku =

Japanese Greco-Roman wrestler

Personal information
- Nationality: Japan
- Born: January 4, 1995 (age 31) Okinawa, Japan
- Height: 174 cm (5 ft 9 in)

Sport
- Country: Japan
- Sport: Wrestling
- Weight class: 77 kg
- Event: Greco-Roman
Medal record
Men's Greco-Roman wrestling
Representing Japan
Olympic Games
Bronze medal – third place	2020 Tokyo	77 kg
Olympic Qualification Tournament
Silver medal – second place	2021 Almaty	77 kg
Japan National Championships
Gold medal – first place	2020 Tokyo	77 kg
Gold medal – first place	2019 Tokyo	77 kg
Bronze medal – third place	2018 Tokyo	77 kg
All-Japan Invitational Championships
Gold medal – first place	2018 Tokyo	77 kg
Junior World Championships
Bronze medal – third place	2013 Sofia	66 kg

Shohei Yabiku (屋比久翔平, Yabiku Shōhei; born January 4, 1995) is a Japanese Greco-Roman wrestler. He qualified for the 2020 Summer Olympics, having finished runner-up to Akzhol Makhmudov in men's Greco-Roman 77 kg at the 2021 Asian Qualification Tournament in Almaty, Kazakhstan. In the 77 kg event, Yabiku won a bronze medal.

He competed in the 77 kg event at the 2022 World Wrestling Championships held in Belgrade, Serbia.
