= Karapet Chalyan =

Armenian Greco-Roman wrestler

Personal information
- Born: 7 August 1993 (age 33) Gyumri, Armenia
- Height: 172 cm (5 ft 8 in)

Sport
- Country: Armenia
- Sport: Amateur wrestling
- Event: Greco-Roman
Medal record
Men's Greco-Roman wrestling
Representing Armenia
European Games
Silver medal – second place	2019 Minsk	77 kg
European Championships
Bronze medal – third place	2016 Riga	75 kg
Bronze medal – third place	2020 Rome	77 kg

Karapet Chalyan (born 7 August 1993) is an Armenian Greco-Roman wrestler. He is a silver medalist at the European Games and a two-time bronze medalist at the European Wrestling Championships. He also represented Armenia at the 2020 Summer Olympics held in Tokyo, Japan.

== Career ==
In 2019, Chalyan represented Armenia at the European Games in Minsk, Belarus and he won the silver medal in the 77 kg event. In the final, he lost against Aleksandr Chekhirkin of Russia.

Chalyan won one of the bronze medals in the 77 kg event at the 2020 European Wrestling Championships held in Rome, Italy. In the same year, he competed in the men's 77 kg event at the 2020 Individual Wrestling World Cup held in Belgrade, Serbia. In 2021, he lost his bronze medal match in the 82 kg event at the 2021 European Wrestling Championships in Warsaw, Poland.

Chalyan competed in the men's 77 kg event at the 2020 Summer Olympics held in Tokyo, Japan. He lost his bronze medal match against Rafig Huseynov of Azerbaijan.

Chalyan competed in the 82 kg event at the 2022 World Wrestling Championships held in Belgrade, Serbia.

== Achievements ==
Year	Tournament	Venue	Result	Event
2016	European Championships	Riga, Latvia	3rd	Greco-Roman 75 kg
2019	European Games	Minsk, Belarus	2nd	Greco-Roman 77 kg
2020	European Championships	Rome, Italy	3rd	Greco-Roman 77 kg
