= Aleksandr Chekhirkin =

Russian Greco-Roman wrestler

Personal information
- Full name: Aleksandr Konstantinovich Chekhirkin
- Nationality: (Russia) Russian
- Born: 13 March 1986 (age 40) Rostov-on-Don, RSFSR, USSR (now Russia)
- Height: 1.75 m (5 ft 9 in)
- Weight: 78 kg (172 lb)

Sport
- Country: Russia
- Sport: Wrestling
- Event: Greco-Roman
- Club: Radnik
- Coached by: R. A. Boltunov
Medal record
Men's Greco-Roman wrestling
Representing Russia
World Championships
Gold medal – first place	2018 Budapest	77 kg
European Games
Gold medal – first place	2019 Minsk	77 kg
European Championships
Gold medal – first place	2014 Vantaa	75 kg
World Cup
Silver medal – second place	2015 Tehran	75 kg

Aleksandr Konstantinovich Chekhirkin (Russian: Александр Константинович Чехиркин; born 13 March 1986) is a Russian former Greco-Roman wrestler. He is a three-times national champion, having won in 2009, 2017 and 2018. Internationally, Chekhirkin won the 2014 European Wrestling Championships in Vantaa, Finland, defeating 2012 Olympic silver medallist Arsen Julfalakyan in the final. He was originally runner-up at the 2017 World Wrestling Championships, losing to Serbian wrestler Viktor Nemeš, but his medal was later stripped off due to doping (glucocorticoid). At the 2018 World Wrestling Championships he earned the gold medal for the Russian Federation at 77 kilos.

In March 2021, he qualified at the European Qualification Tournament to compete at the 2020 Summer Olympics in Tokyo, Japan.
