= Viktor Nemeš =

Serbian Greco-Roman wrestler

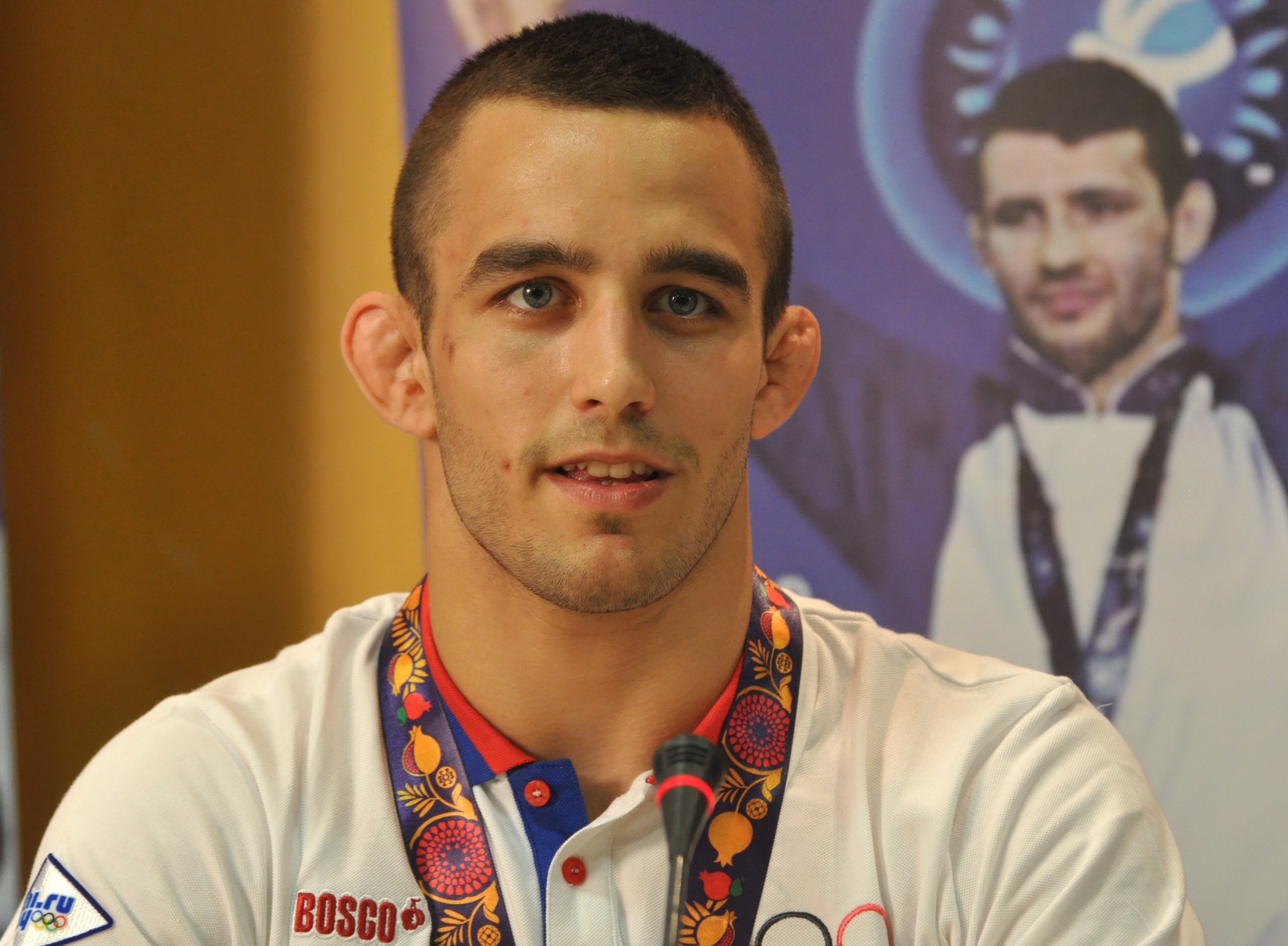
- Nemeš in 2015

Personal information
- Born: 21 July 1993 (age 33) Senta, Serbia, FR Yugoslavia
- Height: 1.75 m (5 ft 9 in)
- Weight: 77 kg (170 lb)

Sport
- Country: Serbia
- Sport: Wrestling
- Event: Greco-Roman
Medal record
Men's Greco-Roman wrestling
Representing Serbia
World Championships
Gold medal – first place	2017 Paris	75 kg
Bronze medal – third place	2018 Budapest	77 kg
European Championships
Silver medal – second place	2016 Riga	75 kg
Silver medal – second place	2018 Kaspiysk	77 kg
Silver medal – second place	2023 Zagreb	77 kg
Bronze medal – third place	2019 Bucharest	77 kg
Individual World Cup
Bronze medal – third place	2020 Belgrade	77 kg
European Games
Silver medal – second place	2015 Baku	75 kg
Mediterranean Games
Gold medal – first place	2022 Oran	77 kg
Silver medal – second place	2026 Taranto	87 kg
Military World Games
Bronze medal – third place	2019 Wuhan	77 kg
Dan Kolov & Nikola Petrov Tournament
Gold medal – first place	2018 Sofia	77 kg
Grand Prix
Bronze medal – third place	2026 Tirana	82 kg

Viktor Nemeš (Serbian Cyrillic: Виктор Немеш; Hungarian: Nemes Viktor, born 21 July 1993) is a Serbian Greco-Roman wrestler. His twin brother Mate Nemeš is also a wrestler.

== Biography ==
Nemeš represented Serbia at the first ever European Games and was the first competitor for Serbia to win a medal at the 2015 European Games when he won his silver medal, losing to the Azerbaijani Elvin Mursaliyev.

Nemeš won a silver medal at the 2016 Riga European Championships in March. He also represented Serbia at the 2016 Summer Olympics in Rio de Janeiro, Brasil but he lost in the quarterfinals to the eventual silver medallist Mark Madsen of Denmark.

At the 2017 World Wrestling Championships in Paris, Nemeš edged the 2016 Summer Olympics bronze medallist Saeid Abdevali of Iran in the opening round and later defeated the Russian wrestler Aleksandr Chekhirkin in the gold medal final, with a score of 4–1. This triumph brought him his first world medal and Nemeš became the second world wrestling champion from the independent Serbia, after Davor Štefanek's world title in 2014.

Nemeš won his second European silver medal at the 2018 European Wrestling Championships in Russia. He faced the two-time Olympic champion and home favourite Roman Vlasov in the final, where he eventually lost 1–5. At the 2018 World Wrestling Championships in Budapest, Nemeš met Chekhirkin again in the third round. But this time, in the rematch of the last year's final, Nemeš lost to Chekhirkin 1–2. He later went on winning in repechage rounds and the bronze medal match to claim his second senior world medal.

At the 2019 Euros in Romania, Nemeš lost to the defending champion Roman Vlasov but later went on winning a bronze medal. In 2020, he won one of the bronze medals in the 77 kg event at the 2020 Individual Wrestling World Cup held in Belgrade, Serbia. In March 2021, he competed at the European Qualification Tournament in Budapest, Hungary hoping to qualify for the 2020 Summer Olympics in Tokyo, Japan.

In 2022, he competed in the 77 kg event at the European Wrestling Championships in Budapest, Hungary where he was eliminated in his first match. He competed in the 77 kg event at the 2022 World Wrestling Championships held in Belgrade, Serbia.

Nemeš competed at the 2024 European Wrestling Olympic Qualification Tournament in Baku, Azerbaijan hoping to qualify for the 2024 Summer Olympics in Paris, France. He was eliminated in his first match and he did not qualify for the Olympics. Nemeš also competed at the 2024 World Wrestling Olympic Qualification Tournament held in Istanbul, Turkey without qualifying for the Olympics.
