= 2017 European Wrestling Championships – Men's Greco-Roman 71 kg =

The Men's Greco-Roman 71 kg is a competition featured at the 2017 European Wrestling Championships, and was held in Novi Sad, Serbia on May 7.

== Medalists ==
Gold	Bálint Korpási (HUN)
Silver	Pavel Liakh (BLR)
Bronze	Aleksandar Maksimović (SRB)
Bronze	Abuyazid Mantsigov (RUS)

== Results ==
Legend

- F — Won by fall

=== Final ===
Final
Pavel Liakh (BLR)	0
Bálint Korpási (HUN)	4

=== Top half ===
Round of 32
Aleksandar Maksimović (SRB)	9
Dawid Kareciński (POL)	1
Ruslan Pashkulskiy (BUL)	3^{F}
Ismael Navarro Sánchez (ESP)	1
Leoš Drmola (SVK)	0
Pavel Liakh (BLR)	8

Round of 16
Timo Badusch (GER)	0
Riccardo Abbrescia (ITA)	8
Jan Zizka (CZE)	2
Evrik Nikoghosyan (FRA)	6
Gievgkeni Pentorets (GRE)	1
Aleksandar Maksimović (SRB)	4
Ruslan Pashkulskiy (BUL)	5
Pavel Liakh (BLR)	11

Quarterfinals
Riccardo Abbrescia (ITA)	2
Evrik Nikoghosyan (FRA)	5
Aleksandar Maksimović (SRB)	1
Pavel Liakh (BLR)	3

Semifinals
Evrik Nikoghosyan (FRA)	2
Pavel Liakh (BLR)	4

=== Bottom half ===
Round of 32
Hugo Passos (POR)	0
Petter Karlsen (NOR)	9
Abuyazid Mantsigov (RUS)	3
Dominik Etlinger (CRO)	1
Hasan Aliyev (AZE)	8
Nikita Masjuks (LAT)	0
Goga Apriamashvili (GEO)	1
Zakarias Tallroth (SWE)	2
Christoph Burger (AUT)	0
Bálint Korpási (HUN)	8
Carl Ekstrom (DEN)	1
Nicolas Christen (SUI)	6^{F}
Murat Dağ (TUR)	6
Rafayel Aleksanyan (ARM)	1
Artur Politaiev (UKR)	6
Ilie Cojocari (ROU)	9

Round of 16
Petter Karlsen (NOR)	0
Abuyazid Mantsigov (RUS)	5
Hasan Aliyev (AZE)	3
Zakarias Tallroth (SWE)	2
Bálint Korpási (HUN)	4
Nicolas Christen (SUI)	0
Murat Dağ (TUR)	5
Ilie Cojocari (ROU)	2

Quarterfinals
Abuyazid Mantsigov (RUS)	2
Hasan Aliyev (AZE)	1
Bálint Korpási (HUN)	5
Murat Dağ (TUR)	0

Semifinals
Abuyazid Mantsigov (RUS)	1
Bálint Korpási (HUN)	2

=== Repechage ===
Repechage round 1
Leoš Drmola (SVK)	8
Ruslan Pashkulskiy (BUL)	2
Christoph Burger (AUT)	2
Nicolas Christen (SUI)	0

Repechage round 2
Leoš Drmola (SVK)	0
Aleksandar Maksimović (SRB)	7^{F}
Christoph Burger (AUT)	0
Murat Dağ (TUR)	3

Bronze medals
Aleksandar Maksimović (SRB)	2
Evrik Nikoghosyan (FRA)	1
Murat Dağ (TUR)	1
Abuyazid Mantsigov (RUS)	9
