= 2018 World Wrestling Championships – Men's Greco-Roman 72 kg =

Men's Greco-Roman 72 kg at the 2018 World Championships
- Venue: László Papp Budapest Sports Arena
- Dates: 25–26 October 2018
- Competitors: 29 from 29 nations

Medalists
gold medal	Frank Stäbler	Germany
silver medal	Bálint Korpási	Hungary
bronze medal	Aik Mnatsakanian	Bulgaria
bronze medal	Rasul Chunayev	Azerbaijan

The men's Greco-Roman 72 kilograms is a competition featured at the 2018 World Wrestling Championships, and was held in Budapest, Hungary on 25 and 26 October.

This Greco-Roman wrestling competition consists of a single-elimination tournament, with a repechage used to determine the winner of two bronze medals. The two finalists face off for gold and silver medals. Each wrestler who loses to one of the two finalists moves into the repechage, culminating in a pair of bronze medal matches featuring the semifinal losers each facing the remaining repechage opponent from their half of the bracket.

== Results ==
Legend

- C — Won by 3 cautions given to the opponent
- F — Won by fall

=== Final ===
Final
Bálint Korpási (HUN)	1
Frank Stäbler (GER)	2

=== Top half ===
Round of 32
Tarek Benaissa (ALG)	8
Matouš Morbitzer (CZE)	4
Leoš Drmola (SVK)	7^{F}
Benedikt Puffer (AUT)	0
Joílson Júnior (BRA)	8
Jarvis Tarkong (PLW)	0
Roman Pacurkowski (POL)	0
Aleksandar Maksimović (SRB)	9
Aik Mnatsakanian (BUL)	9
Aziz Boualem (MAR)	0
Taha Yaseen (IRQ)	4
Zhang Hujun (CHN)	6
Ņikita Masjuks (LAT)	0
Daniel Soini (SWE)	2

Round of 16
Bálint Korpási (HUN)	11^{C}
Tarek Benaissa (ALG)	0
Leoš Drmola (SVK)	7
Joílson Júnior (BRA)	15
Aleksandar Maksimović (SRB)	3
Aik Mnatsakanian (BUL)	5
Zhang Hujun (CHN)	9
Daniel Soini (SWE)	1

Quarterfinals
Bálint Korpási (HUN)	8
Joílson Júnior (BRA)	0
Aik Mnatsakanian (BUL)	9
Zhang Hujun (CHN)	4

Semifinals
Bálint Korpási (HUN)	3
Aik Mnatsakanian (BUL)	1

=== Bottom half ===
Round of 32
Kuldeep Malik (IND)	0
Tomohiro Inoue (JPN)	9
RaVaughn Perkins (USA)	7
Murat Dağ (TUR)	8
Park Dae-kun (KOR)	1
Mohammad Ali Geraei (IRI)	3
Abuyazid Mantsigov (RUS)	10^{F}
Pavel Liakh (BLR)	2
Frank Stäbler (GER)	12
Giorgi Khutchua (GEO)	3
Aram Vardanyan (UZB)	4
Parviz Nasibov (UKR)	3

Round of 16
Rasul Chunayev (AZE)	3
Tomohiro Inoue (JPN)	1
Murat Dağ (TUR)	2
Mohammad Ali Geraei (IRI)	7
Abuyazid Mantsigov (RUS)	3
Frank Stäbler (GER)	3
Aram Vardanyan (UZB)	2
Demeu Zhadrayev (KAZ)	3

Quarterfinals
Rasul Chunayev (AZE)	6
Mohammad Ali Geraei (IRI)	4
Frank Stäbler (GER)	10
Demeu Zhadrayev (KAZ)	6

Semifinals
Rasul Chunayev (AZE)	1
Frank Stäbler (GER)	9

=== Repechage ===
Repechage round 1
Giorgi Khutchua (GEO)	0
Abuyazid Mantsigov (RUS)	8

Repechage round 2
Tarek Benaissa (ALG)	4
Joílson Júnior (BRA)	1
Abuyazid Mantsigov (RUS)	8
Demeu Zhadrayev (KAZ)	1

Bronze medals
Tarek Benaissa (ALG)	0
Aik Mnatsakanian (BUL)	9
Abuyazid Mantsigov (RUS)	3
Rasul Chunayev (AZE)	4
