= 2016 World Wrestling Championships – Men's Greco-Roman 71 kg =

Men's Greco-Roman 71 kg at the 2016 World Championships
- Venue: SYMA Sports and Conference Centre
- Dates: 10 December 2016
- Competitors: 29 from 29 nations

Medalists
gold medal	Bálint Korpási	Hungary
silver medal	Daniel Cataraga	Moldova
bronze medal	Hasan Aliyev	Azerbaijan
bronze medal	Ilie Cojocari	Romania

The men's Greco-Roman 71 kilograms is a competition featured at the 2016 World Wrestling Championships, and was held in Budapest, Hungary on 10 December.

== Results ==
=== Final ===
Final
Daniel Cataraga (MDA)	1
Bálint Korpási (HUN)	2

=== Top half ===
Round of 32
Varsham Boranyan (ARM)	2
Afshin Biabangard (IRI)	2
Hasan Aliyev (AZE)	2
Dominik Etlinger (CRO)	1
Mindia Tsulukidze (GEO)	2
Tero Halmesmäki (FIN)	1
Timo Badusch (GER)	2
Fazliddin Nomozov (UZB)	1
Deyvid Dimitrov (BUL)	1
Pavel Liakh (BLR)	5

Round of 16
Takahiro Umeno (JPN)	1
Adam Kurak (RUS)	5
Daniel Cataraga (MDA)	6
Varsham Boranyan (ARM)	0
Hasan Aliyev (AZE)	3
Mindia Tsulukidze (GEO)	1
Timo Badusch (GER)	2
Pavel Liakh (BLR)	5

Quarterfinals
Adam Kurak (RUS)	0
Daniel Cataraga (MDA)	6
Hasan Aliyev (AZE)	8
Pavel Liakh (BLR)	0

Semifinals
Daniel Cataraga (MDA)	3
Hasan Aliyev (AZE)	3

=== Bottom half ===
Round of 32
Filip Dubský (CZE)	0
Chris Gonzalez (USA)	8
Denys Demyankov (UKR)	1
Ilie Cojocari (ROU)	2
Artak Margaryan (FRA)	6
Stefan Steigl (AUT)	1
Zhang Ridong (CHN)	5
Leoš Drmola (SVK)	5
Bálint Korpási (HUN)	4
Kairatbek Tugolbaev (KGZ)	1
Aleksandar Maksimović (SRB)	5
Akrem Boudjemline (ALG)	2
Askhat Zhanbirov (KAZ)	3
Mohammed Rafiq Holi (IND)	10
Yunus Özel (TUR)	1
Dawid Kareciński (POL)	2

Round of 16
Chris Gonzalez (USA)	2
Ilie Cojocari (ROU)	2
Artak Margaryan (FRA)	10
Leoš Drmola (SVK)	1
Bálint Korpási (HUN)	2
Aleksandar Maksimović (SRB)	0
Mohammed Rafiq Holi (IND)	1
Dawid Kareciński (POL)	2

Quarterfinals
Ilie Cojocari (ROU)	5
Artak Margaryan (FRA)	2
Bálint Korpási (HUN)	11
Dawid Kareciński (POL)	0

Semifinals
Ilie Cojocari (ROU)	0
Bálint Korpási (HUN)	8

=== Repechage ===
Repechage round 1
Kairatbek Tugolbaev (KGZ)	1
Aleksandar Maksimović (SRB)	1

Repechage round 2
Varsham Boranyan (ARM)	1
Adam Kurak (RUS)	5
Aleksandar Maksimović (SRB)	4
Dawid Kareciński (POL)	2

Bronze medals
Adam Kurak (RUS)	1
Hasan Aliyev (AZE)	2
Aleksandar Maksimović (SRB)	2
Ilie Cojocari (ROU)	5
