= 2017 World Wrestling Championships – Men's Greco-Roman 71 kg =

Men's Greco-Roman 71 kg at the 2017 World Championships
- Venue: AccorHotels Arena
- Dates: 21 August 2017
- Competitors: 37 from 37 nations

Medalists
gold medal	Frank Stäbler	Germany
silver medal	Demeu Zhadrayev	Kazakhstan
bronze medal	Bálint Korpási	Hungary
bronze medal	Mohammad Ali Geraei	Iran

The men's Greco-Roman 71 kilograms is a competition featured at the 2017 World Wrestling Championships, and was held in Paris, France on 21 August 2017.

== Results ==
Legend

- F — Won by fall

=== Finals ===
Semifinals		Final
Bálint Korpási (HUN)	1
Demeu Zhadrayev (KAZ)	1	Demeu Zhadrayev (KAZ)	3
Daniel Cataraga (MDA)	2	Frank Stäbler (GER)	8
Frank Stäbler (GER)	4

=== Top half ===
==== Section 1 ====
Round of 64

Round of 32
Bálint Korpási (HUN)	9
Benedikt Puffer (AUT)	0
Leoš Drmola (SVK)	9
Riccardo Abbrescia (ITA)	7
Ibrahim Ghanem (EGY)	3
Varsham Boranyan (ARM)	2
Aram Vardanyan (UZB)	2
Ilie Cojocari (ROU)	3

Round of 16
Bálint Korpási (HUN)	10
Leoš Drmola (SVK)	0
Ibrahim Ghanem (EGY)	2
Ilie Cojocari (ROU)	1

Quarterfinals
Bálint Korpási (HUN)	3
Ibrahim Ghanem (EGY)	2

==== Section 2 ====
Round of 64

Round of 32
Demeu Zhadrayev (KAZ)	2
Petter Karlsen (NOR)	1
Adam Kurak (RUS)	4
Grzegorz Wanke (POL)	1
Matouš Morbitzer (CZE)	0
Pat Smith (USA)	5
Jair Cuero (COL)	7
Nurgazy Asangulov (KGZ)	9

Round of 16
Demeu Zhadrayev (KAZ)	6
Adam Kurak (RUS)	2
Pat Smith (USA)	2
Nurgazy Asangulov (KGZ)	8

Quarterfinals
Demeu Zhadrayev (KAZ)	6
Nurgazy Asangulov (KGZ)	4

=== Bottom half ===
==== Section 3 ====
Round of 64

Round of 32
Daniel Cataraga (MDA)	9
Ismael Navarro (ESP)	0
Lee Chang-min (KOR)	2
Svilen Kostadinov (BUL)	2
Yogesh Sangwan (IND)	1
Takeshi Izumi (JPN)	3
Sun Longxi (CHN)	6
Murat Dağ (TUR)	12

Round of 16
Daniel Cataraga (MDA)	8
Svilen Kostadinov (BUL)	0
Takeshi Izumi (JPN)	2
Murat Dağ (TUR)	1

Quarterfinals
Daniel Cataraga (MDA)	11
Takeshi Izumi (JPN)	1

==== Section 4 ====
Round of 64
Tarek Benaissa (ALG)	4
Parviz Nasibov (UKR)	1
Zakarias Tallroth (SWE)	0
Evrik Nikoghosyan (FRA)	6^{F}
Rasul Chunayev (AZE)	8
Jefrin Mejía (HON)	0
Frank Stäbler (GER)	9
Luis de León (DOM)	0
Joílson Júnior (BRA)	1
Ņikita Masjuks (LAT)	2^{F}

Round of 32
Shmagi Bolkvadze (GEO)	2
Mohammad Ali Geraei (IRI)	3
Tarek Benaissa (ALG)	1
Evrik Nikoghosyan (FRA)	2
Rasul Chunayev (AZE)	1
Frank Stäbler (GER)	2
Ņikita Masjuks (LAT)	2
Pavel Liakh (BLR)	5

Round of 16
Mohammad Ali Geraei (IRI)	7
Evrik Nikoghosyan (FRA)	1
Frank Stäbler (GER)	7
Pavel Liakh (BLR)	1

Quarterfinals
Mohammad Ali Geraei (IRI)	3
Frank Stäbler (GER)	6

=== Repechage ===
Repechage round 1
Luis de León (DOM)	0
Rasul Chunayev (AZE)	8

Repechage round 2
Petter Karlsen (NOR)	2
Adam Kurak (RUS)	3
Rasul Chunayev (AZE)	8
Pavel Liakh (BLR)	4

Repechage round 3
Adam Kurak (RUS)	5
Nurgazy Asangulov (KGZ)	2
Rasul Chunayev (AZE)	7
Mohammad Ali Geraei (IRI)	8

Bronze medals
Adam Kurak (RUS)	1
Bálint Korpási (HUN)	2
Mohammad Ali Geraei (IRI)	10
Daniel Cataraga (MDA)	8
