= 2019 World Wrestling Championships – Men's Greco-Roman 72 kg =

Men's Greco-Roman 72 kg at the 2019 World Championships
- Venue: Barys Arena
- Dates: 14–15 September 2019
- Competitors: 25 from 25 nations

Medalists
gold medal	Abuyazid Mantsigov	Russia
silver medal	Aram Vardanyan	Uzbekistan
bronze medal	Aik Mnatsakanian	Bulgaria
bronze medal	Bálint Korpási	Hungary

The men's Greco-Roman 72 kilograms is a competition featured at the 2019 World Wrestling Championships, and was held in Nur-Sultan, Kazakhstan on 14 and 15 September.

This Greco-Roman wrestling competition consists of a single-elimination tournament, with a repechage used to determine the winner of two bronze medals. The two finalists face off for gold and silver medals. Each wrestler who loses to one of the two finalists moves into the repechage, culminating in a pair of bronze medal matches featuring the semifinal losers each facing the remaining repechage opponent from their half of the bracket.

Abuyazid Mantsigov from Russia won the gold medal.

== Results ==
=== Final ===
Final
Aram Vardanyan (UZB)	0
Abuyazid Mantsigov (RUS)	9

=== Top half ===
Round of 32
Lin Ming-dian (TPE)	0
Michael Widmayer (GER)	8
Demeu Zhadrayev (KAZ)	9
Jarvis Tarkong (PLW)	0
Ruslan Ahamalyieu (BLR)	1
Aram Vardanyan (UZB)	9

Round of 16
Aik Mnatsakanian (BUL)	6
Tomohiro Inoue (JPN)	0
Yogesh Sangwan (IND)	5
Raymond Bunker (USA)	6
Michael Widmayer (GER)	4
Demeu Zhadrayev (KAZ)	3
Aram Vardanyan (UZB)	8
Zhang Hujun (CHN)	0

Quarterfinals
Aik Mnatsakanian (BUL)	6
Raymond Bunker (USA)	2
Michael Widmayer (GER)	3
Aram Vardanyan (UZB)	4

Semifinals
Aik Mnatsakanian (BUL)	1
Aram Vardanyan (UZB)	4

=== Bottom half ===
Round of 32
Maksym Yevtushenko (UKR)	1
Lee Ji-yeon (KOR)	5
Cengiz Arslan (TUR)	1
Mateusz Bernatek (POL)	3
Malkhas Amoyan (ARM)	8
Aleksa Erski (SRB)	0
Amin Kavianinejad (IRI)	1
Iuri Lomadze (GEO)	9
Sanan Suleymanov (AZE)	2
Dominik Etlinger (CRO)	0
Ruslan Tsarev (KGZ)	9
Hassan Hassan Mohamed (EGY)	1

Round of 16
Abuyazid Mantsigov (RUS)	8
Lee Ji-yeon (KOR)	0
Mateusz Bernatek (POL)	0
Malkhas Amoyan (ARM)	7
Iuri Lomadze (GEO)	5
Sanan Suleymanov (AZE)	11
Ruslan Tsarev (KGZ)	0
Bálint Korpási (HUN)	6

Quarterfinals
Abuyazid Mantsigov (RUS)	4
Malkhas Amoyan (ARM)	0
Sanan Suleymanov (AZE)	0
Bálint Korpási (HUN)	6

Semifinals
Abuyazid Mantsigov (RUS)	8
Bálint Korpási (HUN)	0

=== Repechage ===
Repechage round 1
Ruslan Ahamalyieu (BLR)	1
Zhang Hujun (CHN)	3

Repechage round 2
Zhang Hujun (CHN)	0
Michael Widmayer (GER)	2
Lee Ji-yeon (KOR)	7
Malkhas Amoyan (ARM)	4

Bronze medals
Michael Widmayer (GER)	3
Aik Mnatsakanian (BUL)	3
Lee Ji-yeon (KOR)	0
Bálint Korpási (HUN)	9
