= 2013 World Wrestling Championships – Men's Greco-Roman 66 kg =

Men's Greco-Roman 66 kg at the 2013 World Championships
- Venue: László Papp Budapest Sports Arena
- Dates: 22 September 2013
- Competitors: 39 from 39 nations

Medalists
gold medal	Ryu Han-su	South Korea
silver medal	Islambek Albiev	Russia
bronze medal	Sandeep Tulsi Yadav	India
bronze medal	Frank Stäbler	Germany

The men's Greco-Roman 66 kilograms is a competition featured at the 2013 World Wrestling Championships, and was held at the László Papp Budapest Sports Arena in Budapest, Hungary on 22 September 2013.

== Results ==
Legend

- C — Won by 3 cautions given to the opponent
- F — Won by fall

=== Finals ===
Semifinals		Final
Aleksandar Maksimović (SRB)	0
Ryu Han-su (KOR)	5^{C}	Ryu Han-su (KOR)	5^{C}
Islambek Albiev (RUS)	10^{F}	Islambek Albiev (RUS)	3
Hasan Aliyev (AZE)	1

=== Top half ===
==== Section 1 ====
Round of 64

Round of 32
Jefrin Mejía (HON)	6
Kao Shih-min (TPE)	0
Joseph Lopez (GUM)	0
Vladimiros Matias (GRE)	8
André Feitosa (BRA)	0
Alexis Cuero (COL)	8
Benedikt Puffer (AUT)	0
Aleksandar Maksimović (SRB)	7

Round of 16
Jefrin Mejía (HON)	7
Vladimiros Matias (GRE)	10
Alexis Cuero (COL)	4
Aleksandar Maksimović (SRB)	11

Quarterfinals
Vladimiros Matias (GRE)	1
Aleksandar Maksimović (SRB)	6

==== Section 2 ====
Round of 64

Round of 32
Mihai Cosniceanu (MDA)	4^{C}
Georgian Carpen (ROU)	2
Ismael Navarro (ESP)	0
Sandeep Tulsi Yadav (IND)	5
Tarek Benaissa (ALG)	0
Matouš Morbitzer (CZE)	7
Sharur Vardanyan (SWE)	0
Ryu Han-su (KOR)	7

Round of 16
Mihai Cosniceanu (MDA)	2
Sandeep Tulsi Yadav (IND)	6
Matouš Morbitzer (CZE)	1
Ryu Han-su (KOR)	9

Quarterfinals
Sandeep Tulsi Yadav (IND)	0
Ryu Han-su (KOR)	10

=== Bottom half ===
==== Section 3 ====
Round of 64

Round of 32
Pedro Mulens (CUB)	1
Islambek Albiev (RUS)	4^{F}
Sasun Ghambaryan (ARM)	8
Plamen Petrov (BUL)	0
Yerbol Konyratov (KAZ)	2
Frank Stäbler (GER)	3
Edgaras Venckaitis (LTU)	7
Hiroyuki Shimizu (JPN)	3

Round of 16
Islambek Albiev (RUS)	6
Sasun Ghambaryan (ARM)	5
Frank Stäbler (GER)	6
Edgaras Venckaitis (LTU)	1

Quarterfinals
Islambek Albiev (RUS)	8
Frank Stäbler (GER)	0

==== Section 4 ====
Round of 64
Marius Thommesen (NOR)	3
Sachino Davitaia (GEO)	2
Yan Pengfei (CHN)	2
Alan Dzakayev (UKR)	4
Attila Lévai (SVK)	0
Afshin Biabangard (IRI)	8
Nurbek Kholmukhammatov (UZB)	5
Ruslan Tyumenbayev (KGZ)	5
Dominik Etlinger (CRO)	0
Hasan Aliyev (AZE)	3
Atakan Yüksel (TUR)	2
Ellis Coleman (USA)	2
Mikhail Siamionau (BLR)	0
Dawid Kareciński (POL)	3

Round of 32
Tamás Lőrincz (HUN)	5
Marius Thommesen (NOR)	0
Alan Dzakayev (UKR)	1
Afshin Biabangard (IRI)	4
Ruslan Tyumenbayev (KGZ)	0
Hasan Aliyev (AZE)	7
Atakan Yüksel (TUR)	6
Dawid Kareciński (POL)	0

Round of 16
Tamás Lőrincz (HUN)	2
Afshin Biabangard (IRI)	0
Hasan Aliyev (AZE)	3
Atakan Yüksel (TUR)	1

Quarterfinals
Tamás Lőrincz (HUN)	2
Hasan Aliyev (AZE)	5

=== Repechage ===
Repechage round 2
Sharur Vardanyan (SWE)	6
Matouš Morbitzer (CZE)	0
Pedro Mulens (CUB)	3
Sasun Ghambaryan (ARM)	2

Repechage round 3
Sharur Vardanyan (SWE)	4
Sandeep Tulsi Yadav (IND)	6
Pedro Mulens (CUB)	2
Frank Stäbler (GER)	3

Bronze medals
Sandeep Tulsi Yadav (IND)	4
Aleksandar Maksimović (SRB)	0
Frank Stäbler (GER)	5
Hasan Aliyev (AZE)	2
