= 2013 European Wrestling Championships – Men's Greco-Roman 66 kg =

The men's Greco-Roman 66 kg is a competition featured at the 2013 European Wrestling Championships, and was held at the Tbilisi Sports Palace in Tbilisi, Georgia on 24 March 2013.

== Medalists ==
| Gold | Tamás Lőrincz; Hungary |
| Silver | Adam Kurak; Russia |
| Bronze | Artak Margaryan; France |
| Bronze | Hasan Aliyev; Azerbaijan |

== Results ==
Legend

- F — Won by fall

=== Final ===
| Final |
| Tamás Lőrincz (HUN) | 1 | 3 |
| Adam Kurak (RUS) | 0 | 1 |

=== Top Half ===
Round of 32

Round of 16
Atakan Yüksel (TUR) | 6 | 5^{F}
Sharur Vardanyan (SWE) | 0 | 0
Sasun Ghambaryan (ARM) | 2 | 4
Tero Välimäki (FIN) | 0 | 1
Filip Dubský (CZE) | 0 | 0
Artak Margaryan (FRA) | 3 | 1
Benedikt Puffer (AUT) | 0 | 0
Tamás Lőrincz (HUN) | 1 | 2

Quarterfinals
Atakan Yüksel (TUR) | 3 | 1
Sasun Ghambaryan (ARM) | 0 | 1
Artak Margaryan (FRA) | 0 | 0
Tamás Lőrincz (HUN) | 1 | 8^{F}

Semifinals
Atakan Yüksel (TUR) | 0 | 0
Tamás Lőrincz (HUN) | 7 | 4

=== Bottom Half ===
Round of 32
Hasan Aliyev (AZE) | 2 | 1
Yaraslau Kardash (BLR) | 0 | 0
Georgian Carpen (ROU) | 0 | 0
Aleksandar Maksimović (SRB) | 1 | 2
Mykola Savchenko (UKR) | 2 | 1
Attila Lévai (SVK) | 0 | 0
Davide Cascavilla (ITA) | 0 | 0
Sven Dürrmeier (GER) | 1 | 1
Adam Kurak (RUS) | 3 | 2
Oscar Parra (ESP) | 0 | 0
Ion Luchiţă (MDA) | 4 | 0 | 3^{F}
Vladimiros Matias (GRE) | 1 | 3 | 2
Tomasz Świerk (POL) | 0 | 0
Manuchar Tskhadaia (GEO) | 1 | 1
Dominik Etlinger (CRO) | 1 | 1
Hugo Passos (POR) | 0 | 0

Round of 16
Hasan Aliyev (AZE) | 1 | 1
Aleksandar Maksimović (SRB) | 0 | 0
Mykola Savchenko (UKR) | 2 | 5
Sven Dürrmeier (GER) | 0 | 1
Adam Kurak (RUS) | 1 | 2
Ion Luchiţă (MDA) | 0 | 0
Manuchar Tskhadaia (GEO) | 5 | 0 | 4^{F}
Dominik Etlinger (CRO) | 0 | 1 | 0

Quarterfinals
Hasan Aliyev (AZE) | 2 | 5
Mykola Savchenko (UKR) | 0 | 0
Adam Kurak (RUS) | 3 | 3 | 3
Manuchar Tskhadaia (GEO) | 6 | 1 | 1

Semifinals
Hasan Aliyev (AZE) | 6 | 0 | 0
Adam Kurak (RUS) | 0 | 3 | 1

=== Repechage ===
Repechage round 1
Oscar Parra (ESP) | 0 | 0
Ion Luchiţă (MDA) | 1 | 6^{F}

Repechage round 2
Benedikt Puffer (AUT) | 0 | 0
Artak Margaryan (FRA) | 1 | 4
Ion Luchiţă (MDA) | 0 | 1 | 0
Manuchar Tskhadaia (GEO) | 1 | 0 | 1

Bronze medals
Artak Margaryan (FRA) | 1 | 1 | 7
Atakan Yüksel (TUR) | 1 | 0 | 0
Manuchar Tskhadaia (GEO) | 1 | 2 | 0
Hasan Aliyev (AZE) | 1 | 1 | 3
