= 2018 European Wrestling Championships – Men's Greco-Roman 72 kg =

The Men's Greco-Roman 72 kg is a competition featured at the 2018 European Wrestling Championships, and was held in Kaspiysk, Russia on May 1 and May 2.

== Medalists ==
| Gold | Adam Kurak (RUS) |
| Silver | Rasul Chunayev (AZE) |
| Bronze | Bálint Korpási (HUN) |
| Bronze | Daniel Cataraga (MDA) |

Iuri Lomadze won a bronze medal but he was stripped of his medal after a doping violation. As a result Daniel Cataraga was awarded the bronze medal.

== Results ==
Legend

- F — Won by fall

=== Final ===
| Final |
| Adam Kurak (RUS) | 9 |
| Rasul Chunayev (AZE) | 5 |

=== Top half ===
Round of 32

Round of 16
Danijel Janečić (CRO) | 0
Evrik Nikoghosyan (FRA) | 4
Maximilian Schwabe (GER) | 4
Gevorg Sahakyan (POL) | 7
Bálint Korpási (HUN) | 3
Adam Kurak (RUS) | 3
Jan Žižka (CZE) | 6
Ņikita Masjuks (LAT) | 0

Quarterfinals
Evrik Nikoghosyan (FRA) | 1
Gevorg Sahakyan (POL) | 5
Adam Kurak (RUS) | 8
Jan Žižka (CZE) | 0

Semifinals
Gevorg Sahakyan (POL) | 2
Adam Kurak (RUS) | 5

=== Bottom half ===
Round of 32
Murat Dağ (TUR) | 1
Rasul Chunayev (AZE) | 4
Pål Eirik Gundersen (NOR) | 0
Aleksandar Maksimović (SRB) | 8
Denis Horváth (SVK) | 4
Christoph Burger (AUT) | 2
Iuri Lomadze (GEO) | 7
Ilie Cojocari (ROU) | 3
Toni Ojala (FIN) | 9
Bohdan Kabyn (UKR) | 4

Round of 16
Daniel Soini (SWE) | 0
Daniel Cataraga (MDA) | 4
Yury Kankou (BLR) | 0
Rasul Chunayev (AZE) | 9
Aleksandar Maksimović (SRB) | 8
Denis Horváth (SVK) | 0
Iuri Lomadze (GEO) | 16
Toni Ojala (FIN) | 6

Quarterfinals
Daniel Cataraga (MDA) | 2
Rasul Chunayev (AZE) | 3
Aleksandar Maksimović (SRB) | 0
Iuri Lomadze (GEO) | 5

Semifinals
Rasul Chunayev (AZE) | 11
Iuri Lomadze (GEO) | 3

=== Repechage ===
Repechage round 1
Murat Dağ (TUR) | 6
Yury Kankou (BLR) | 0

Repechage round 2
Bálint Korpási (HUN) | 9
Jan Žižka (CZE) | 1
Murat Dağ (TUR) | 0
Daniel Cataraga (MDA) | 3

Bronze medals
Bálint Korpási (HUN) | 10
Gevorg Sahakyan (POL) | 0
Daniel Cataraga (MDA) | 6
Iuri Lomadze (GEO) | 15
