= 2016 European Wrestling Championships – Men's Greco-Roman 71 kg =

The men's Greco-Roman 71 kg is a competition featured at the 2016 European Wrestling Championships, and was held in Riga, Latvia on March 13.

== Medalists ==
Gold	Varsham Boranyan; Armenia
Silver	Aleksandar Maksimović; Serbia
Bronze	Hasan Aliyev; Azerbaijan
Bronze	Bálint Korpási; Hungary

== Results ==
Legend

- F — Won by fall

=== Final ===
Final
Varsham Boranyan (ARM)	3
Aleksandar Maksimović (SRB)	0

=== Top half ===
==== Section 1 ====
Qualification
Hasan Aliyev (AZE)	8
Kristaps Kalnakārklis (LAT)	0

Round of 16
Lari Hirvi (FIN)	1
Vojtech Jakus (SVK)	4
Yunus Özel (TUR)	1
Brage Ringmeim (NOR)	0
Zakarias Tallroth (SWE)	3
Aleksandar Maksimović (SRB)	3
Jan Žižka (CZE)	0
Hasan Aliyev (AZE)	8

Quarterfinals
Vojtech Jakus (SVK)	0
Yunus Özel (TUR)	3
Aleksandar Maksimović (SRB)	3
Hasan Aliyev (AZE)	1

Semifinals
Yunus Özel (TUR)	1
Aleksandar Maksimović (SRB)	2

=== Bottom half ===
==== Section 2 ====
Qualification
Mindia Tsulukidze (GEO)	2
Daniel Cataraga (MDA)	6
Benedikt Puffer (AUT)	2
Svilen Kostadinov (BUL)	11
Tomi Hinoveanu (ROM)	0
Varsham Boranyan (ARM)	8
Nicolas Christen (SUI)	1
Hugo Passos (POR)	3
Frank Stäbler (GER)	5
Dominik Etlinger (CRO)	5
Davide Cascavilla (ITA)	0
Gievgkeni Pentorets (GRE)	9
Pavel Liakh (BLR)	1
Bálint Korpási (HUN)	5
Narek Grigoryan (RUS)	8
Mykola Savchenko (UKR)	5

Round of 16
Daniel Cataraga (MDA)	1
Svilen Kostadinov (BUL)	3
Varsham Boranyan (ARM)	8
Hugo Passos (POR)	0
Dominik Etlinger (CRO)	9
Gievgkeni Pentorets (GRE)	0
Bálint Korpási (HUN)	3
Narek Grigoryan (RUS)	0

Quarterfinals
Svilen Kostadinov (BUL)	2
Varsham Boranyan (ARM)	8
Dominik Etlinger (CRO)	0
Bálint Korpási (HUN)	3

Semifinals
Varsham Boranyan (ARM)	2
Bálint Korpási (HUN)	1

=== Repechage ===
Repechage round 1
Tomi Hinoveanu (ROM)	8
Hugo Passos (POR)	0

Repechage round 2
Zakarias Tallroth (SWE)	1
Hasan Aliyev (AZE)	8^{F}
Tomi Hinoveanu (ROM)	2
Svilen Kostadinov (BUL)	2

Bronze medals
Hasan Aliyev (AZE)	8
Yunus Özel (TUR)	1
Tomi Hinoveanu (ROM)	0
Bálint Korpási (HUN)	9
