= 2020 Individual Wrestling World Cup – Men's Greco-Roman 72 kg =

The Men's Greco-Roman 72 kg is a competition featured at the 2020 Individual Wrestling World Cup, and was held in Belgrade, Serbia on 12 and 13 December 2020.

== Medalists ==
Gold	Bálint Korpási; Hungary
Silver	Malkhas Amoyan; Armenia
Bronze	Ruslan Tsarev; Kyrgyzstan
Bronze	Cengiz Arslan; Turkey

== Results ==
Legend

- F — Won by fall
- WO — Won by walkover

1/8 finals
Ruslan Tsarev (KGZ)	1
Bálint Korpási (HUN)	2
Maksym Yevtushenko (UKR)	9
Luka Malobabić (CRO)	0
Aik Mnatsakanian (BUL)	8
Andreas Vetsch (SUI)	0
Idris Ibaev (GER)	10
Leoš Drmola (SVK)	2
Cengiz Arslan (TUR)	6
Narek Oganian (RUS)	3
Ibrahim Ghanem (FRA)	2
Ulvu Ganizade (AZE)	1
Valentin Petic (MDA)	WO
~~Aditya Kundu (IND)~~
Malkhas Amoyan (ARM)	6
Aleksandar Maksimović (SRB)	0

Quarterfinals
Bálint Korpási (HUN)	3
Maksym Yevtushenko (UKR)	0
Aik Mnatsakanian (BUL)	3
Idris Ibaev (GER)	0
Cengiz Arslan (TUR)	4
Ibrahim Ghanem (FRA)	3
Valentin Petic (MDA)	0
Malkhas Amoyan (ARM)	12

Semifinals
Bálint Korpási (HUN)	3
Aik Mnatsakanian (BUL)	1
Cengiz Arslan (TUR)	0
Malkhas Amoyan (ARM)	7

Final
Bálint Korpási (HUN)	1
Malkhas Amoyan (ARM)	1

Repechage round 1
Ruslan Tsarev (KGZ)	4
Maksym Yevtushenko (UKR)	0
Aleksandar Maksimović (SRB)	1
Valentin Petic (MDA)	2

Bronze medals
Ruslan Tsarev (KGZ)	3
Aik Mnatsakanian (BUL)	1
Valentin Petic (MDA)	1
Cengiz Arslan (TUR)	5
