= Sandeep Tulsi Yadav =

Indian wrestler

Sandeep Yadav
Personal information
- Nationality: India
- Born: Sandeep Tulsi Yadav; 4 January 1988 (age 38) Jaunpur, Uttarpradesh, India
- Occupation: Wrestler
- Spouse: Priyanka Yadav
Medal record
Men's Greco-Roman wrestling
Representing India
World Championships
Bronze medal – third place	2013 Budapest	66 kg
Commonwealth Wrestling Championship
Silver medal – second place	2011 Melbourne	66kg

Sandeep Tulsi Yadav is an Indian Greco-Roman wrestler who competes in the 66 kg division. He became the first Indian to win a medal in Greco-Roman wrestling at the world level when he won bronze at the 2013 World Wrestling Championships in the same division. He defeated Aleksandar Maksimović of Serbia in the bronze medal match. He also won silver medal in 2011 Commonwealth Wrestling Championship held in Melbourne, Australia. Sandeep Yadav has won gold medal in 2011 and bronze medal in 2015 National Championship.He also won bronze medal in Junior National championships 2006.

Yadav competed in Asian championship in the year off 2011,2012 and 2013. He also competed in the World Wrestling Championships in 2011,2013 and 2014.
