= Cengiz Arslan =

Turkish Greco-Roman wrestler

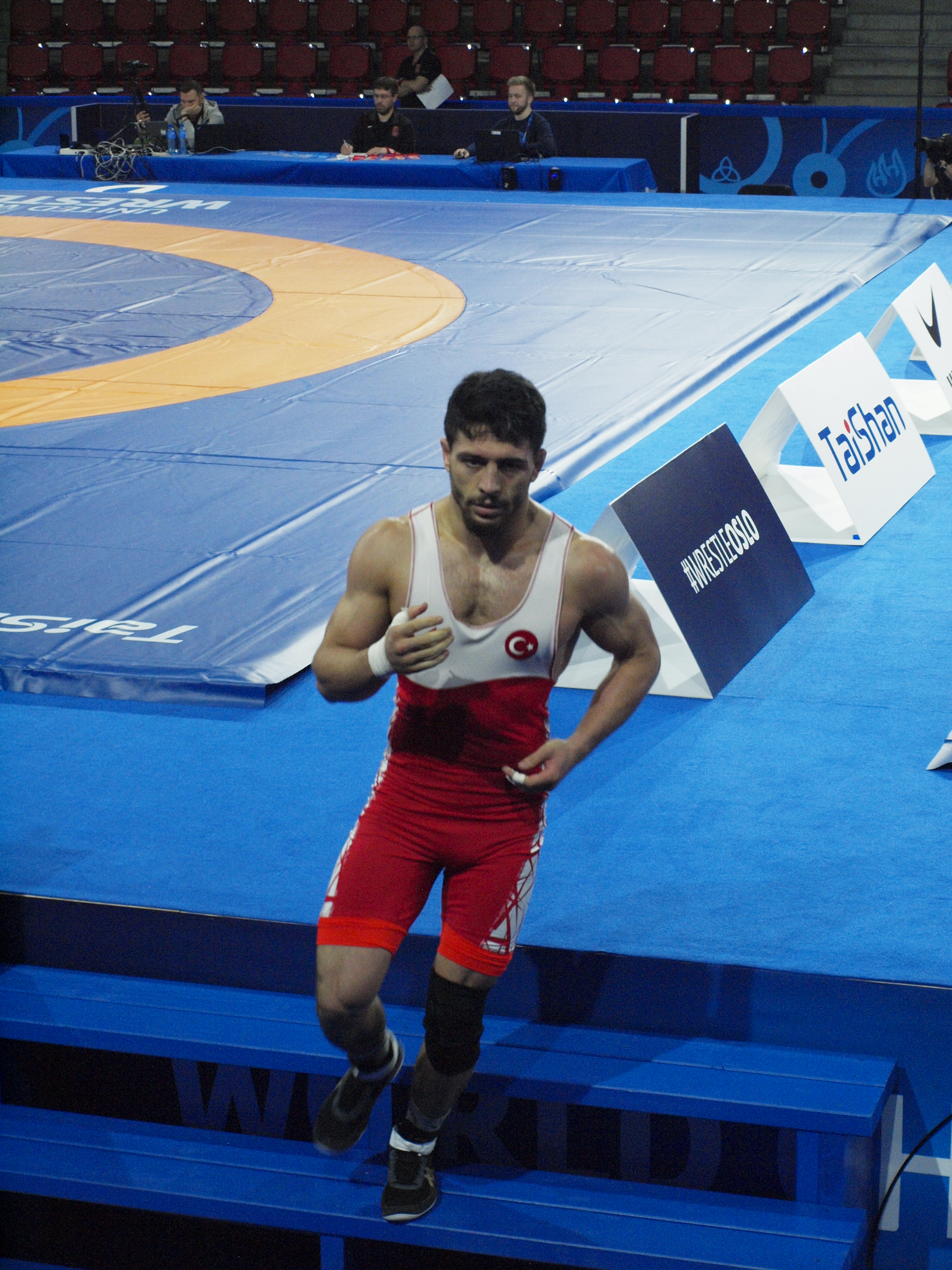

Personal information
- Born: 1 June 1996 (age 30)
- Height: 172 cm (5 ft 8 in)

Sport
- Country: Turkey
- Sport: Amateur wrestling
- Event: Greco-Roman
Medal record
Men's Greco-Roman wrestling
Representing Turkey
European Championships
Silver medal – second place	2019 Bucharest	72 kg
Bronze medal – third place	2026 Tirana	72 kg
Individual World Cup
Bronze medal – third place	2020 Belgrade	72 kg
Vehbi Emre & Hamit Kaplan Tournament
Gold medal – first place	2023 Istanbul	77 kg
Silver medal – second place	2019 Istanbul	72 kg
Silver medal – second place	2026 Antalya	72 kg
Bronze medal – third place	2015 Istanbul	66 kg
Bronze medal – third place	2025 Kocaeli	72 kg
Dan Kolov - Nikola Petrov Tournament
Gold medal – first place	2018 Sofia	72 kg
World U23 Championships
Gold medal – first place	2018 Bucharest	72 kg
European U23 Championship
Silver medal – second place	2018 Istanbul	72 kg
Bronze medal – third place	2019 Novi Sad	72 kg
World University Championship
Bronze medal – third place	2016 Çorum	71 kg
European Juniors Championships
Gold medal – first place	2015 İstanbul	66 kg

Cengiz Arslan (born 1 June 1996) is a Turkish Greco-Roman wrestler. He won the silver medal in the 72 kg event at the 2019 European Wrestling Championships held in Bucharest, Romania. In the final, he lost against Abuyazid Mantsigov of Russia.

== Career ==
In 2018, he won the silver medal in the men's 72 kg event at the European U23 Wrestling Championship held in Istanbul, Turkey.

In 2020, he won one of the bronze medals in the 72 kg event at the Individual Wrestling World Cup held in Belgrade, Serbia. He also won one of the bronze medals in his event at the 2021 Wladyslaw Pytlasinski Cup held in Warsaw, Poland.

== Achievements ==
Year	Tournament	Location	Result	Event
2019	European Championships	Bucharest, Romania	2nd	Greco-Roman 72 kg
2026	European Championships	Tirana, Albania	3rd	Greco-Roman 72 kg
