= 2010 World Wrestling Championships – Men's Greco-Roman 60 kg =

Men's Greco-Roman 60 kg at the 2010 World Championships
- Venue: Olympic Stadium
- Dates: 7 September 2010
- Competitors: 31 from 31 nations

Medalists
| gold medal | Hasan Aliyev | Azerbaijan |
| silver medal | Ryutaro Matsumoto | Japan |
| bronze medal | Almat Kebispayev | Kazakhstan |
| bronze medal | Jung Ji-hyun | South Korea |

The men's Greco-Roman 60 kilograms is a competition featured at the 2010 World Wrestling Championships, and was held at the Olympic Stadium in Moscow, Russia on 7 September.

This Greco-Roman wrestling competition consists of a single-elimination tournament, with a repechage used to determine the winner of two bronze medals.

== Results ==
Legend

- F — Won by fall
- R — Retired

=== Final ===
| Final |
| Hasan Aliyev (AZE) | 0 | 1 | 1 |
| Ryutaro Matsumoto (JPN) | 1 | 0 | 0 |

=== Top half ===
Round of 32
Dilshod Aripov (UZB) | 0 | 2 | 3
Jeremiah Davis (USA) | 2 | 1 | 0
Ravinder Singh (IND) | 2 | 6
Dawid Kareciński (POL) | 1 | 4
Patrick Stadelmann (SUI) | 0 | 0
Almat Kebispayev (KAZ) | 1 | 6
Hasan Aliyev (AZE) | 1 | 6
Tonimir Sokol (CRO) | 0 | 2
Ivo Angelov (BUL) | 1 | 7
Jansel Ramírez (DOM) | 0 | 0
Andrés Montaño (ECU) | 2 | 3
Agamyrat Orazsähedow (TKM) | 0 | 0
Ruslan Tyumenbayev (KGZ) | 0 | 0
Jarkko Ala-Huikku (FIN) | 1 | 0^{R}

Round of 16
Davor Štefanek (SRB) | 0 | 0
Dilshod Aripov (UZB) | 1 | 4
Ravinder Singh (IND) | 1 | 0
Almat Kebispayev (KAZ) | 3 | 1
Hasan Aliyev (AZE) | 1 | 3
Ivo Angelov (BUL) | 0 | 0
Andrés Montaño (ECU) | 0 | 0
Ruslan Tyumenbayev (KGZ) | 1 | 1

Quarterfinals
Dilshod Aripov (UZB) | 0 | 0
Almat Kebispayev (KAZ) | 2 | 1
Hasan Aliyev (AZE) | 1 | 4
Ruslan Tyumenbayev (KGZ) | 0 | 3

Semifinals
Almat Kebispayev (KAZ) | 2 | 0
Hasan Aliyev (AZE) | 2 | 2

=== Bottom half ===
Round of 32
Tarik Belmadani (FRA) | 4 | 6
Sayed Abdelmoneim (EGY) | 0 | 0
Jung Ji-hyun (KOR) | 1 | 3
Ondřej Ulip (CZE) | 0 | 0
Omid Norouzi (IRI) | 2 | 7
Aurelian Leciu (ROU) | 0 | 0
Wan Feihu (CHN) | 0 | 0
Zaur Kuramagomedov (RUS) | 1 | 2
Lenur Temirov (UKR) | 2 | 1
Vahan Juharyan (ARM) | 0 | 0
Albert Baghumyan (ESP) | 0 | 0
Ryutaro Matsumoto (JPN) | 1 | 3
Dzmitry Alenski (BLR) | 1 | 0 | 0
Edgaras Venckaitis (LTU) | 0 | 3 | 1
Abdülsamet Uğurlu (TUR) | 2 | 0 | 0
Revaz Lashkhi (GEO) | 0 | 3 | 2

Round of 16
Tarik Belmadani (FRA) | 0 | 0
Jung Ji-hyun (KOR) | 1 | 1
Omid Norouzi (IRI) | 2 | 2
Zaur Kuramagomedov (RUS) | 0 | 0
Lenur Temirov (UKR) | 0 | 0
Ryutaro Matsumoto (JPN) | 1 | 4
Edgaras Venckaitis (LTU) | 2 | 0
Revaz Lashkhi (GEO) | 3 | 2

Quarterfinals
Jung Ji-hyun (KOR) | 1 | 1
Omid Norouzi (IRI) | 0 | 0
Ryutaro Matsumoto (JPN) | 1 | 0 | 2^{F}
Revaz Lashkhi (GEO) | 0 | 2 | 0

Semifinals
Jung Ji-hyun (KOR) | 1 | 3 | 0
Ryutaro Matsumoto (JPN) | 6 | 0 | 2

=== Repechage ===
Repechage round 1
Tonimir Sokol (CRO) | 0 | 0
Ivo Angelov (BUL) | 1 | 2
Albert Baghumyan (ESP) | 0 | 0
Lenur Temirov (UKR) | 2 | 4

Repechage round 2
Ivo Angelov (BUL) | 2 | 2
Ruslan Tyumenbayev (KGZ) | 0 | 0
Lenur Temirov (UKR) | 0 | 1 | 0
Revaz Lashkhi (GEO) | 1 | 0 | 1

Bronze medals
Ivo Angelov (BUL) | 1 | 0
Almat Kebispayev (KAZ) | 0 | 3^{F}
Revaz Lashkhi (GEO) | 0 | 0
Jung Ji-hyun (KOR) | 1 | 3
