= Bálint Korpási =

Hungarian wrestler (born 1987)

Personal information
- Nationality: Hungarian
- Born: 30 March 1987 (age 39) Esztergom, Hungarian People's Republic
- Height: 170 cm (5 ft 7 in)
- Weight: 76 kg (168 lb)

Sport
- Sport: Olympic wrestling
- Event: Greco-Roman wrestling
Medal record
Men's Greco-Roman wrestling
Representing Hungary
World Championships
Gold medal – first place	2016 Budapest	71 kg
Silver medal – second place	2018 Budapest	72 kg
Bronze medal – third place	2019 Nur-Sultan	72 kg
Bronze medal – third place	2017 Paris	71 kg
European Wrestling Championships
Gold medal – first place	2017 Novi Sad	71 kg
Bronze medal – third place	2018 Kaspiysk	72 kg
Bronze medal – third place	2016 Riga	71 kg
Individual World Cup
Gold medal – first place	2020 Belgrade	72 kg

Bálint Korpási (born 30 March 1987) is a Hungarian Greco-Roman wrestler competing in the 72 kg division. He won gold medal in 2016 world championships in Budapest.

In 2020, he won the gold medal in the 72 kg event at the 2020 Individual Wrestling World Cup held in Belgrade, Serbia. In March 2021, he qualified at the European Qualification Tournament to compete at the 2020 Summer Olympics in Tokyo, Japan. He competed in the 67 kg event.
