= Akhuryan =

Village in Shirak, Armenia

Akhuryan Ախուրյան
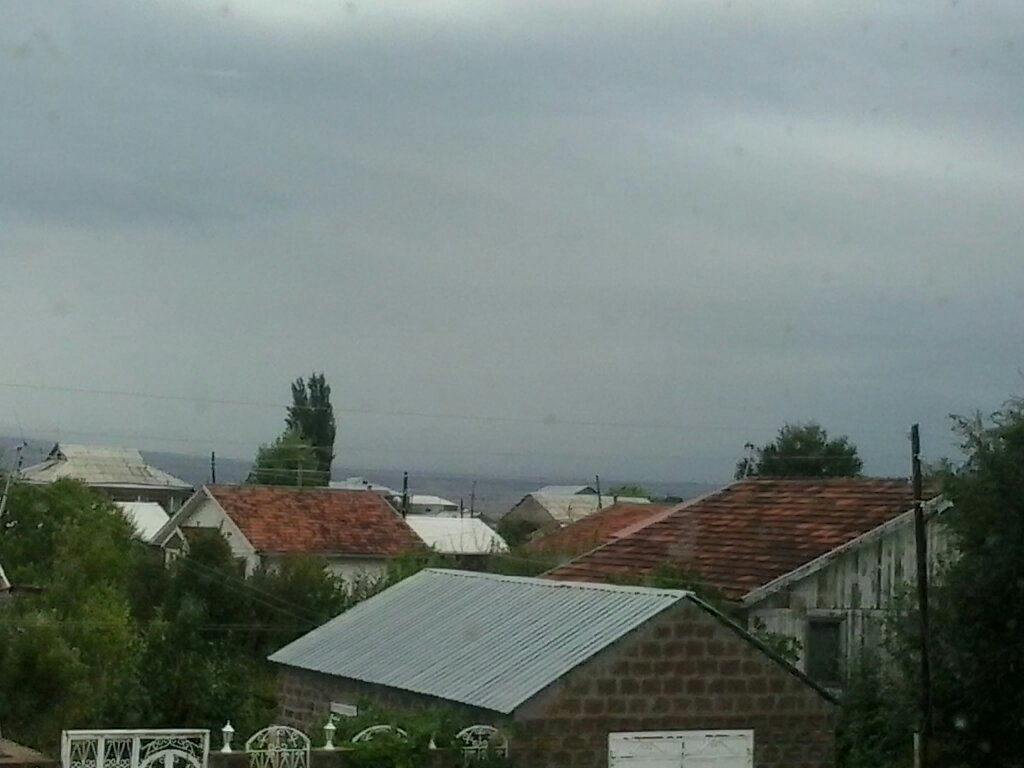

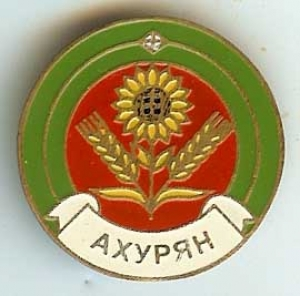
- Coat of arms

- Location within Armenia Location within Shirak
- Coordinates: 40°46′53″N 43°53′47″E
- Country: Armenia
- Province: Shirak
- Municipality: Akhuryan
- Elevation: 1,500 m (4,900 ft)

Population (2011)
  - Total: 7,113
- Time zone: UTC+4
  - Summer (DST): UTC+5
- Climate: Dfb

Akhuryan (Armenian: Ախուրյան) is a village in the Akhuryan Municipality of the Shirak Province of Armenia. The Statistical Committee of Armenia reported its population was 7,113 as per the 2011 official census down from 9,696 at the 2001 census.

== Demographics ==
Historical population
Year	Pop.	±% p.a.
1831	456	—
1897	1,635	+1.95%
1926	2,447	+1.40%
1939	2,320	−0.41%
1959	2,966	+1.24%
1970	3,812	+2.31%
1979	6,364	+5.86%
2001	9,696	+1.93%
2011	7,113	−3.05%

== Notable people ==
- Varsham Boranyan, European champion in Greco-Roman wrestling
- Levon Geghamyan, Greco-Roman wrestler
