= Ruslan Tsarev =

Kyrgyzstani sport wrestler

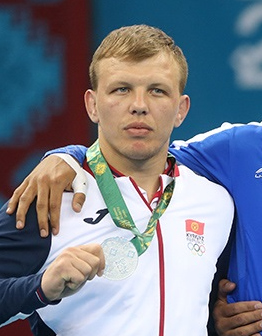
- Tsarev at the 2017 Islamic Solidarity Games

Personal information
- Born: 16 July 1991 (age 35)
- Height: 170 cm (5 ft 7 in)

Sport
- Sport: Greco-Roman wrestling
- Club: Berkut, Bishkek
- Coached by: Farchad Ushurov
Medal record
Representing Kyrgyzstan
Asian Championships
Gold medal – first place	2014 Astana	66 kg
Silver medal – second place	2015 Doha	71 kg
Silver medal – second place	2021 Almaty	72 kg
Bronze medal – third place	2016 Bangkok	75 kg
Individual World Cup
Bronze medal – third place	2020 Belgrade	72 kg
Islamic Solidarity Games
Silver medal – second place	2017 Baku	71 kg

Ruslan Tsarev (born 16 July 1991) is a Russian Greco-Roman wrestler from Kyrgyzstan. He competed at the 2016 Olympics, where he was eliminated in the round of 16 by Tarek Benaissa. At the Asian championships he won a gold, a silver and a bronze medal in 2014–2016.

In 2020, he won one of the bronze medals in the 72 kg event at the 2020 Individual Wrestling World Cup held in Belgrade, Serbia.

He has a twin brother, Roman Tsarev.
