= 2025 in Legacy Fighting Alliance =

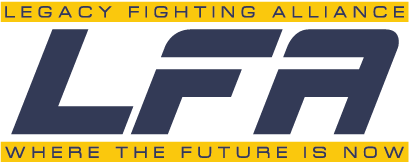

Information
- Promotion: Legacy Fighting Alliance
- First date: January 10, 2025
- Last date: November 21, 2025

Events
- Total events: 24

Fights
- Total fights: 296
- Title fights: 20

The year 2025 was the ninth year in the history of Legacy Fighting Alliance (LFA) a mixed martial arts promotion based in the United States.

== List of events ==
#	Event	Date	Venue	Location
1	LFA 199: Farias vs. Visconde	January 10, 2025	Tachi Palace Casino Resort	Lemoore, California, U.S.
2	LFA 200: Johns vs. Douglas	January 25, 2025	Mystic Lake Casino Hotel	Prior Lake, Minnesota, U.S.
3	LFA 201: Conceição vs. Silva	February 7, 2025	Ginásio do Povilho	Cajamar, Brazil
4	LFA 202: Nkuta vs. Garcia	February 21, 2025	Seneca Niagara Casino & Hotel	Niagara Falls, New York, U.S.
5	LFA 203: Satybaldiev vs. Soares	March 6, 2025	Palms Casino Resort	Las Vegas, Nevada, U.S.
6	LFA 204: Cunha vs. Freeman	March 22, 2025	Foxwoods Resort Casino	Mashantucket, Connecticut, U.S.
7	LFA 205: Pires vs. Abojer	March 28, 2025	ASBAC Brasília	Brasília, Brazil
8	LFA 206: Gennrich vs. Lebosnoyani	April 11, 2025	Mystic Lake Casino Hotel	Prior Lake, Minnesota, U.S.
9	LFA 207: Lewis vs. Miranda	April 18, 2025	Sanford Pentagon	Sioux Falls, South Dakota, U.S.
10	LFA 208: Mecate vs. Reyes	May 9, 2025	Kaiser Permanente Arena	Santa Cruz, California, U.S.
11	LFA 209: De Lara vs. Henrique	May 24, 2025	Malai Manso Resort	Chapada dos Guimarães, Brazil
12	LFA 210: Lawrence vs. Reyes	June 13, 2025	Freedom Hall	Louisville, Kentucky, U.S.
13	LFA 211: Mesquita vs. Dinwoodie	June 20, 2025	Seneca Allegany Resort and Casino	Salamanca, New York, U.S.
14	LFA 212: Degli vs. Severino	July 11, 2025	Ulysses Guimarães Convention Center	Brasília, Brazil
15	LFA 213: Gonzalez vs. Rosales	July 26, 2025	Tachi Palace Casino Resort	Lemoore, California, U.S.
16	LFA 214: Fernando vs. Latu	August 15, 2025	Sanford Pentagon	Sioux Falls, South Dakota, U.S.
17	LFA 215: Miranda vs. Barzilay	August 22, 2025	Ventura County Fairgrounds	Ventura, California, U.S.
18	LFA 216: Silva vs. Bertolso	September 5, 2025	Musiva Cuiabá	Cuiabá, Brazil
19	LFA 217: McKee vs. Nobre	September 12, 2025	Mystic Lake Casino Hotel	Prior Lake, Minnesota, U.S.
20	LFA 218: Nascimento vs. Makaev	September 27, 2025	Pabellón Insular Santiago Martín	Tenerife, Spain
21	LFA 219: Thomson vs. Islomboev	October 10, 2025	F&M Bank Arena	Clarksville, Tennessee, U.S.
21	LFA 220: Tanner vs. Cyr	October 25, 2025	Arizona Financial Theatre	Phoenix, Arizona, U.S.
22	LFA 221: Clark vs. Consuli	November 7, 2025	Nilson Nelson Gymnasium	Brasília, Brazil
23	LFA 222: Pires vs. Belakh	November 14, 2025	Foxwoods Resort Casino	Mashantucket, Connecticut, U.S.
24	LFA 223: Francischinelli vs. Piersma	November 21, 2025	Seneca Niagara Casino & Hotel	Niagara Falls, New York, U.S.

== LFA 199: Farias vs. Visconde ==
LFA 199: Farias vs. Visconde
- Promotion: Legacy Fighting Alliance
- Date: January 10, 2025
- Venue: Tachi Palace Casino Resort
- City: Lemoore, California, United States

LFA 199: Farias vs. Visconde was a mixed martial arts event promoted by Legacy Fighting Alliance that took place on January 12, 2025 in Lemoore, California, United States.

=== Background ===
A featherweight bout between Ary Farias and Sabit Zhusupov was expected to headline the event. However, Zhusupov pulled out for unknown reasons and was replaced by Erick Visconde.

=== Results ===
Main card (UFC Fight Pass)
Weight class				Method	Round	Time	Notes
Featherweight	Erick Visconde	def.	Ary Farias	KO (spinning back elbow)	2	1:08
Heavyweight	Josh Hokit	def.	John Lopez	TKO (punches)	1	2:53
Featherweight	Rafael do Nascimento	def.	Brandon Altomore	Submission (calf slicer)	1	2:06
Catchweight (160 lb)	Shovkhal Churchaev	def.	Enkhtur Bayartsogt	Decision (unanimous) (30–27, 29–28, 29–28)	3	5:00
Middleweight	Theo Haig	def.	Said-Magomed Abdulgaziev	Submission (rear-naked choke)	1	1:49
Heavyweight	Billy Ray Valdez	def.	Larry Gonzales	Decision (unanimous) (30–27, 30–27, 30–27)	3	5:00
Lightweight	Edmund Kwan	def.	Shelden Struble	TKO (elbows)	2	4:33
Preliminary card (LFA Fight Network)
Welterweight	Sczar Charles	def.	Ueslei Alves	Decision (majority) (29–28, 28–28, 29–28)	3	5:00
Women's Flyweight	Gabrielle McComb	def.	Esmira Mammadova	Submission (rear-naked choke)	1	3:16	(Note: Mammadova missed weight (126.6 lb).)
Light Heavyweight	Shealor Ladd	def.	Tylando Mattress	TKO (punches)	2	1:43
Postliminary card (Begins after the Main card)
Catchweight (150 lb)	Jermaine Edwards	def.	Abraham Del Toro	Submission (rear-naked choke)	1	1:22
Bantamweight	Julio Larrave	def.	Allen Silhanek	TKO (arm injury)	1	2:21

== LFA 200: Johns vs. Douglas ==
LFA 200: Johns vs. Douglas
- Promotion: Legacy Fighting Alliance
- Date: January 25, 2025
- Venue: Mystic Lake Casino Hotel
- City: Prior Lake, Minnesota, United States

LFA 200: Johns vs. Douglas was a mixed martial arts event promoted by Legacy Fighting Alliance that took place on January 25, 2025, in Prior Lake, Minnesota, United States.

=== Background ===
The event featured the three titles fight unification bout:

- LFA Featherweight Championship bout between current champion Elijah Johns and interim champion Lerryan Douglas.
- LFA Women's Flyweight Championship bout between current champion Shannon Clark and interim champion Cheyanne Bowers.
- LFA Welterweight Championship bout between current champion Vanilton Antunes and interim champion Shamidkhan Magomedov.

=== Results ===
Main card (UFC Fight Pass)
Weight class				Method	Round	Time	Notes
Featherweight	Lerryan Douglas (ic)	def.	Elijah Johns (c)	TKO (punches)	2	2:35	(Note: For the LFA Featherweight Championship.)
Women's Flyweight	Shannon Clark (c)	def.	Cheyanne Bowers (ic)	Decision (split) (47–48, 48–47, 48–47)	5	5:00	(Note: For the LFA Women's Flyweight Championship.)
Welterweight	Shamidkhan Magomedov (ic)	def.	Vanilton Antunes (c)	Submission (rear-naked choke)	1	4:36	(Note: For the LFA Welterweight Championship.)
Welterweight	Chris Mixan	def.	Joey Hart	TKO (punches)	1	2:10
Catchweight (130 lb)	Devon Lozej	def.	Enrique Pacheco Parra	KO (body kick)	2	1:44
Heavyweight	Alvin Hines	def.	Mark Currier	TKO (punches)	1	1:48
Preliminary card (LFA Fight Network)
Bantamweight	Ethyn Ewing	def.	Santos Verdinez	KO (head kick)	1	1:47
Heavyweight	Steven Asplund	def.	Hammer Morton	TKO (punches)	3	1:29
Bantamweight	Jeremy Strobel Jr.	def.	Shad Walters	Decision (unanimous) (29–28, 29–28, 29–28)	3	5:00
Lightweight	Steve Collins	def.	Kelton Sneve	Decision (split) (29–28, 28–29, 29–28)	3	5:00
Lightweight	Canon Swanson	def.	Jake Bower	TKO (punches)	1	3:17
Featherweight	Alex Coover	def.	Felipe Martinez Donis	TKO (knees and punches)	1	2:19
Amateur bouts
Middleweight	Brett Wittmann	def.	Mac Kukowski	TKO (punches)	2	0:41
Lightweight	Mitchell Wilson	def.	Brok Hopwood	Submission (arm-triangle choke)	2	1:41

== LFA 201: Conceição vs. Silva ==
LFA 201: Conceição vs. Silva
- Promotion: Legacy Fighting Alliance
- Date: February 7, 2025
- Venue: Ginásio do Povilho
- City: Cajamar, Brazil

LFA 201: Conceição vs. Silva was a mixed martial arts event promoted by Legacy Fighting Alliance that will take place on February 7, 2025, in Cajamar, Brazil.

=== Background ===
A LFA Women's Strawweight Championship bout between current champion Rose Conceição and Edilania da Silva headlined the event. While, an interim LFA Flyweight Championship between Marcos Degli and Lincon Santos took place at the co-main event.

=== Results ===
Main card (UFC Fight Pass)
Weight class				Method	Round	Time	Notes
Women's Strawweight	Edilania da Silva	def.	Rose Conceição (c)	KO (head kick)	5	2:54	(Note: For the LFA Women's Strawweight Championship.)
Flyweight	Marcos Degli	def.	Lincon Santos	KO (punch)	1	0:41	(Note: For the interim LFA Flyweight Championship.)
Featherweight	José Mauro Delano	def.	Abu-Muslim Alikhanov	KO (punch)	1	3:46
Lightweight	Vladimir Kanunnikov	vs.	Paulo Henrique Laia	No Contest (illegal choke)	1	2:57	(Note: Henrique missed weight (160.8 lb). Accidental illegal choke knocked Henrique unconscious.)
Heavyweight	Vladimir Dayneko	def.	André Vieira	Decision (unanimous) (30–24, 30–26, 30–27)	3	5:00
Bantamweight	Rafael Pereira	def.	Janderson Barreto Correia	Decision (unanimous) (30–27, 30–27, 30–27)	3	5:00
Preliminary card (YouTube)
Featherweight	Cássio Barão Jr.	def.	Kauê Luiz Vaz	Decision (unanimous) (30–27, 30–27, 30–27)	3	5:00	(Note: Barão missed weight (149.6 lb))
Bantamweight	Mackson Lee	def.	Filipe Zacaron	TKO (leg kicks)	2	2:03	(Note: Zacaron missed weight (139 lb).)
Featherweight	João Pedro Dantas	def.	Gustavo Henrique Silva	TKO (knee to the body)	1	4:34	(Note: Silva missed weight (146.8 lb).)
Women's Strawweight	Natalia Alves	def.	Nawira Ferreira	Decision (unanimous) (29–28, 30–26, 30–27)	3	5:00
Heavyweight	Guilherme Uriel	def.	Hyago Silva	KO (punches)	1	1:27
Preliminary card (OnlyFans)
Bantamweight	Marcos Aurélio	def.	Victor Gabriel	Decision (unanimous) (30–27, 30–27, 30–27)	3	5:00
Heavyweight	Seyed Mostafa Salehizadeh	def.	Welerson Oliveira	Decision (unanimous) (30–27, 30–27, 30–26)	3	5:00
Women's Flyweight	Leidiane Fernandes	def.	Ruth Pereira	Decision (unanimous) (29–28, 29–28, 29–28)	3	5:00
Featherweight	Eduardo Fiuza Dutra	def.	Sergio Murilo	TKO (elbows and punches)	1	1:50

== LFA 202: Nkuta vs. Garcia ==
LFA 202: Nkuta vs. Garcia
- Promotion: Legacy Fighting Alliance
- Date: February 21, 2025
- Venue: Seneca Niagara Casino & Hotel
- City: Niagara Falls, New York, United States

LFA 202: Nkuta vs. Garcia was a mixed martial arts event promoted by Legacy Fighting Alliance that took place on February 21, 2025, in Niagara Falls, New York, United States.

=== Background ===
A flyweight bout between undefeated prospect Phumi Nkuta and Adrian Garcia headlined the event.

=== Results ===
Main card (UFC Fight Pass)
Weight class				Method	Round	Time	Notes
Flyweight	Phumi Nkuta	def.	Adrian Garcia	Decision (unanimous) (30–27, 30–27, 30–27)	3	5:00
Catchweight (140 lb)	Shuya Kamikubo	def.	Mateus Santos	Submission (twister)	1	4:37
Heavyweight	Phillip Latu	def.	Joe Taylor	Decision (unanimous) (29–28, 29–28, 29–28)	3	5:00
Women's Bantamweight	Sierra Dinwoodie	def.	Nikol Aguirre	Decision (unanimous) (30–27, 30–27, 29–28)	3	5:00	(Note: Dinwoodie missed weight (138.2 lb).)
Bantamweight	Ferdaws Nayimi	def.	Jacob Wiggins	Decision (unanimous) (30–27, 30–27, 29–28)	3	5:00
Women's Strawweight	Cristina Brador	def.	Jayde Sheeley	Decision (unanimous) (30–27, 30–27, 30–27)	3	5:00
Preliminary card (LFA Fight Network)
Featherweight	Elias Rodriguez	def.	Peter Lucitt	TKO (knee and punches)	2	2:22
Amateur bouts
Catchweight (150 lb)	Devon Coates	def.	Antonio Viscomi	Submission (brabo choke)	1	1:29

== LFA 203: Satybaldiev vs. Soares ==
LFA 203: Satybaldiev vs. Soares
- Promotion: Legacy Fighting Alliance
- Date: March 6, 2025
- Venue: Palms Casino Resort
- City: Las Vegas, Nevada, United States

LFA 203: Satybaldiev vs. Soares was a mixed martial arts event promoted by Legacy Fighting Alliance that took place on March 6, 2025, in Las Vegas, Nevada, United States.

=== Background ===
The event marked the promotion's second visit to Las Vegas and first since LFA 173 in December 2023.

A LFA Light Heavyweight Championship bout between current champion Uran Satybaldiev and Leon Soares headlined the event.

=== Results ===
Main card (UFC Fight Pass)
Weight class				Method	Round	Time	Notes
Light Heavyweight	Uran Satybaldiev (c)	def.	Leon Soares	Submission (kimura)	3	2:20	(Note: For the LFA Light Heavyweight Championship)
Middleweight	Sharaf Davlatmurodov	def.	Christiano Frohlich	Decision (unanimous) (30–27, 30–27, 29–28)	3	5:00
Women's Bantamweight	Beatriz Mesquita	def.	Hope Chase	DQ (illegal upkick)	2	2:20
Flyweight	Jose Sandoval	def.	Braden Aupuni Pagaoa	Submission (heel hook)	1	4:57
Heavyweight	Josh Hokit	def.	Ezekiel Latu	Submission (rear-naked choke)	1	0:42
Bantamweight	Stav Koren	def.	Chase Whitmer	Decision (unanimous) (30–27, 30–27, 30–26)	3	5:00
Preliminary card (LFA Fight Network)
Bantamweight	Daniel Araújo Figueiredo	def.	Azizbek Temirov	Decision (unanimous) (30–27, 30–27, 30–27)	3	5:00
Bantamweight	Cameron Sandoval	def.	Victor Santos	Decision (unanimous) (30–27, 30–27, 30–27)	3	5:00
Bantamweight	Ezra Elliott	def.	Jose Vasquez-Lopez	Submission (face crank)	1	1:42

== LFA 204: Cunha vs. Freeman ==
LFA 204: Cunha vs. Freeman
- Promotion: Legacy Fighting Alliance
- Date: March 22, 2025
- Venue: Foxwoods Resort Casino
- City: Mashantucket, Connecticut, United States

LFA 204: Cunha vs. Freeman was a mixed martial arts event promoted by Legacy Fighting Alliance that took place on March 22, 2025, in Mashantucket, Connecticut, United States.

=== Background ===
The event marked the promotion's first visit to Mashantucket.

A LFA Heavyweight Championship bout between current champion Hugo Cunha and Denzel Freeman headlined the event.

=== Results ===
Main card (UFC Fight Pass)
Weight class				Method	Round	Time	Notes
Heavyweight	Denzel Freeman	def.	Hugo Cunha (c)	TKO (punches)	2	2:10	(Note: For the LFA Heavyweight Championship.)
Lightweight	Dylan Mantello	def.	Ednilson Santos	KO (punch)	2	2:36
Lightweight	Joe Giannetti	def.	Leonardo Limberger	TKO (elbows and punches)	1	4:10
Light Heavyweight	Luis Henrique	def.	Justin Sumter	Submission (kimura)	2	4:45
Flyweight	An Tuan Ho	def.	Jimi Natividad	TKO (front kick and punches)	1	0:16
Preliminary card (LFA Fight Network)
Lightweight	Kyle Pufahl	def.	Kevin Carrier	Decision (unanimous) (29–28, 29–28, 29–28)	3	5:00	(Note: Pufahl missed weight (158 lb).)
Light Heavyweight	Quentin Pasley	def.	Reylan Gracie	TKO (flying knee and punches)	1	1:31
Featherweight	Rodrigo Brauna	def.	Kelvin Sterling	Decision (unanimous) (30–27, 30–27, 29–28)	3	5:00
Amateur bouts
Welterweight	Melvin Jovel	def.	Gates Cook	Decision (unanimous) (29–28, 29–28, 29–27)	3	3:00

== LFA 205: Pires vs. Abojer ==
LFA 205: Pires vs. Abojer
- Promotion: Legacy Fighting Alliance
- Date: March 28, 2025
- Venue: ASBAC Brasília
- City: Brasília, Brazil

LFA 205: Pires vs. Abojer was a mixed martial arts event promoted by Legacy Fighting Alliance that took place on March 6, 2025, in Brasília, Brazil.

=== Background ===
A LFA Bantamweight Championship for the vacant title between Vinicius Pires and Lionel Abojer headlined the event.

=== Results ===
Main card (UFC Fight Pass)
Weight class				Method	Round	Time	Notes
Bantamweight	Vinicius Pires	def.	Lionel Abojer	Technical Submission (rear-naked choke)	3	2:44	(Note: For the vacant LFA Bantamweight Championship.)
Lightweight	Manoel Sousa	def.	Lucas Barros Oliveira	Decision (unanimous) (30–27, 30–27, 30–25)	3	5:00
Middleweight	Diego Dias	def.	Pedro Henrique Santos	Submission (rear-naked choke)	1	4:23
Women's Strawweight	Gabriela Fujimoto	def.	Xiomara Piriz	Submission (guillotine choke)	1	2:27	(Note: Piriz missed weight (120.8 lb).)
Catchweight (140 lb)	Herbeth Sousa	def.	Meijy Portela	Submission (guillotine choke)	1	0:52
Featherweight	Luan Pedroso	def.	Aristides Vinícius	Decision (unanimous) (29–28, 29–28, 29–28)	3	5:00
Preliminary card (LFA Fight Network)
Catchweight (138 lb)	Giovanni Garcia	def.	Emerson Oliveira Costa	Decision (unanimous) (30–27, 30–27, 30–27)	3	5:00	(Note: Garcia missed weight (140 lb).)
Featherweight	João Pedro Moreira	def.	Gustavo Ribeiro	KO (punches)	1	1:30
Middleweight	Neemias Santana	def.	Marcos Rezende	KO (punches)	2	1:44
Bantamweight	Diego Paiva	def.	Jeovanny de Oliveira	Decision (majority) (30–27, 28–28, 29–27)	3	5:00
Featherweight	Eduardo Fiuza Dutra	def.	Luis Carlos Dietrich	Submission (rear-naked choke)	1	3:50
Bantamweight	Wellington Mourão	def.	Igor Taylon	Decision (majority) (28–27, 28–28, 29–27)	3	5:00
Flyweight	Thiago Taveira	def.	Douglas Silva	KO (punch and elbow)	2	2:48

== LFA 206: Gennrich vs. Lebosnoyani ==
LFA 206: Gennrich vs. Lebosnoyani
- Promotion: Legacy Fighting Alliance
- Date: April 11, 2025
- Venue: Mystic Lake Casino Hotel
- City: Prior Lake, Minnesota, United States

LFA 206: Gennrich vs. Lebosnoyani was a mixed martial arts event promoted by Legacy Fighting Alliance that took place on April 11, 2025, in Prior Lake, Minnesota, United States.

=== Background ===
A welterweight bout between former LFA Lightweight Champion Kegan Gennrich and Jean-Paul Lebosnoyani headlined the event.

=== Results ===
Main card (UFC Fight Pass)
Weight class				Method	Round	Time	Notes
Welterweight	Jean-Paul Lebosnoyani	def.	Kegan Gennrich	Submission (triangle choke)	1	4:00
Heavyweight	Alvin Hines	def.	Billy Ray Valdez	KO (head kick)	3	2:09
Light Heavyweight	Adam Vigil	def.	Starling Simmons	KO (punches)	1	1:09
Welterweight	Martin Camilo	def.	Perry Stargel	KO (elbow and punch)	1	0:35
Heavyweight	Steven Asplund	def.	Raiden Kovacs	TKO (elbow and punches)	2	1:53
Welterweight	Joey Hart	def.	Omoyele Gonzalez	TKO (doctor stoppage)	2	5:00
Preliminary card (LFA Fight Network)
Featherweight	Taner Trembley	def.	Kyle Zimick	KO (punch)	1	3:13
Featherweight	Santos Verdinez	def.	Timothy Bender	KO (punches)	2	1:22	(Note: Originally a Catchweight (140 lb) bout; Verdinez missed weight (141.8 lb) and the bout was moved to Featherweight.)
Catchweight (130 lb)	Lizzy Gevers	def.	Natalya Speece	Submission (scarf hold armlock)	2	1:25	(Note: Speece missed weight (130.2 lb).)
Welterweight	Noah Gasho	def.	Todd Box	KO (knee)	1	0:51
Amateur bouts
Heavyweight	Ezayah Gomez Oropeza	def.	Christian Porter	TKO (punches)	2	1:39
Catchweight (190 lb)	Mac Kukowski	def.	Blair Phillips	TKO (punches)	1	1:45

== LFA 207: Lewis vs. Miranda ==
LFA 207: Lewis vs. Miranda
- Promotion: Legacy Fighting Alliance
- Date: April 18, 2025
- Venue: Sanford Pentagon
- City: Sioux Falls, South Dakota, United States

LFA 207: Lewis vs. Miranda was a mixed martial arts event promoted by Legacy Fighting Alliance that took place on April 18, 2025, in Sioux Falls, South Dakota, United States.

=== Background ===
A LFA Lightweight Championship bout between current champion Richie Lewis and Richie Miranda headlined the event.

=== Results ===
Main card (UFC Fight Pass)
Weight class				Method	Round	Time	Notes
Lightweight	Richie Miranda	def.	Richie Lewis (c)	TKO (elbows and punches)	5	2:04	(Note: For the LFA Lightweight Championship.)
Featherweight	Mitchell McKee	def.	Greg Fischer	Decision (unanimous) (30–27, 30–27, 30–27)	3	5:00
Lightweight	Landry Ward	def.	Bryce Logan	KO (punches)	1	0:59
Lightweight	Nikita Kulshin	def.	Rudson Caliocane	Decision (unanimous) (30–27, 30–27, 30–27)	3	5:00
Women's Flyweight	Cheyanne Bowers	def.	Elizabeth Rodríguez	Submission (armbar)	1	4:41
Lightweight	Dzhamal Mavliudov	def.	Jordon Tague	Submission (guillotine choke)	2	1:07
Preliminary card (LFA Fight Network)
Featherweight	Ansar Khamzaev	def.	Abbas Abasov	Technical Submission (rear-naked choke)	1	1:17
Women's Strawweight	Cara Greenwell	def.	Leslie Hernandez	Submission (rear-naked choke)	2	3:40
Featherweight	Jordan Oliver	def.	Calob Ramirez	Decision (unanimous) (30–27, 30–27, 30–27)	3	5:00
Amateur bouts
Catchweight (160 lb)	Gift Harding	vs.	Juan Velasquez Jr.	No Contest (accidental knee to groin)	1	1:01

== LFA 208: Mecate vs. Reyes ==
LFA 208: Mecate vs. Reyes
- Promotion: Legacy Fighting Alliance
- Date: May 9, 2025
- Venue: Kaiser Permanente Arena
- City: Santa Cruz, California, United States

LFA 208: Mecate vs. Reyes was a mixed martial arts event promoted by Legacy Fighting Alliance that took place on May 9, 2025, in Santa Cruz, California, United States.

=== Background ===
The event marked the promotion's fourth visit to Santa Cruz and first since LFA 192 in September 2024.

A lightweight bout between Chris Mecate and Javier Reyes headlined the event. Despite originally scheduled as a lightweight, but the bout was moved to 150 pounds instead.

=== Results ===
Main card (UFC Fight Pass)
Weight class				Method	Round	Time	Notes
Catchweight (150 lb)	Chris Mecate	def.	Javier Reyes	Decision (unanimous) (30–27, 29–28, 29–28)	3	5:00
Catchweight (150 lb)	Jacob Rosales	def.	Georgii Eivas	Submission (neck crank)	1	2:13	(Note: Rosales missed weight (151 lb).)
Heavyweight	Josh Hokit	def.	Eric Lunsford	TKO (punches)	1	2:00	(Note: Lunsford missed weight (269.6 lb).)
Welterweight	Luis Francischinelli	def.	Angelo Rivera Jr.	TKO (punches)	1	1:59
Middleweight	Joseph Kropschot	def.	Adland Benson	Submission (rear-naked choke)	2	3:58
Bantamweight	Allan Begosso	def.	Davaajamts Batsuren	Technical Submission (ninja choke)	2	2:28
Light Heavyweight	Isaiah Pinson	def.	Tony Charles	TKO (elbows)	2	2:44
Preliminary card (LFA Fight Network)
Lightweight	Jermaine Edwards	def.	Temuujin Ulzii-Orshikh	Decision (split) (29–28, 28–29, 29–28)	3	5:00
Women Strawweight	Aline David	def.	Stephanie Nayen	KO (front kick and punches)	1	0:12
Lightweight	BeyNoah	def.	Kohl Laren	Decision (unanimous) (29–28, 29–28, 29–28)	3	5:00
Catchweight (140 lb)	Shane Torres	def.	Shadland Walters	TKO (punches)	1	3:44
Catchweight (140 lb)	Vinny Dias	def.	Roger Severson	Decision (unanimous) (30–27, 30–27, 30–27)	3	5:00
Light Heavyweight	Shealor Ladd	def.	Roman Kiziuk	TKO (punches)	2	4:01

== LFA 209: De Lara vs. Henrique ==
LFA 209: De Lara vs. Henrique
- Promotion: Legacy Fighting Alliance
- Date: May 24, 2025
- Venue: Malai Manso Resort
- City: Chapada dos Guimarães, Brazil

LFA 209: De Lara vs. Henrique was a mixed martial arts event promoted by Legacy Fighting Alliance that took place on May 24, 2025, in Chapada dos Guimarães, Brazil.

=== Background ===
The event marked the promotion's first visit to Chapada dos Guimarães.

A featherweight bout between Inglesson de Lara and Bruno Henrique headlined the event.

=== Results ===
Main card (UFC Fight Pass)
Weight class				Method	Round	Time	Notes
Featherweight	Bruno Henrique	def.	Inglesson de Lara	Decision (split) (29–28, 28–29, 29–28)	3	5:00
Welterweight	Joseilton Santos	def.	Carlos Petruzzella	KO (punches)	1	4:24
Lightweight	Juan Pablo Vieira	def.	Carlos Cavalcante	Submission (armbar)	1	3:56
Flyweight	Paulo Henrique da Silva	def.	Hugo Paiva	Decision (split) (30–27, 28–29, 30–27)	3	5:00
Welterweight	Reginaldo Geraldo Jr.	def.	Gilberto Sousa	TKO (punches)	1	1:28
Women's Strawweight	Aieza Ramos Bertolso	def.	Samara Santos	Submission (rear-naked choke)	3	4:05
Preliminary card (LFA Fight Network)
Flyweight	Matheus da Silva Severino	def.	Alan Gabriel	TKO (punches)	1	0:47
Featherweight	Rodrigo Vera	def.	Jonathan Caetano	Decision (unanimous) (30–27, 30–27, 29–28)	3	5:00
Welterweight	Wellington Madeira	def.	Dallys Moraes Gama	Decision (split) (29–28, 27–29, 29–28)	3	5:00
Featherweight	Wily Pereira	def.	Ricardo Leite de Almeida	Decision (unanimous) (30–27, 30–27, 30–27)	3	5:00
Bantamweight	Abraham Racho	def.	Lazaro Junior	KO (punches)	1	1:59
Light Heavyweight	Alan Ribeiro	def.	José Carlos Lima	KO (punch)	1	2:11
Catchweight (130 lb)	Neto Lopes	def.	Lucas Farias	KO (spinning wheel kick and punches)	1	1:20

== LFA 210: Lawrence vs. Reyes ==
LFA 210: Lawrence vs. Reyes
- Promotion: Legacy Fighting Alliance
- Date: June 13, 2025
- Venue: Freedom Hall
- City: Louisville, Kentucky, United States

LFA 210: Lawrence vs. Reyes was a mixed martial arts event promoted by Legacy Fighting Alliance that took place on June 13, 2025, in Louisville, Kentucky, United States.

=== Background ===
The event marked the promotion's second visit to Louisville and first since LFA 180 in March 2024.

A featherweight bout between Lance Lawrence and Willian Lima was scheduled to headline the event. However, Lima withdrew from the bout due to injury and was replaced by Javier Reyes.

=== Results ===
Main card (UFC Fight Pass)
Weight class				Method	Round	Time	Notes
Featherweight	Javier Reyes	def.	Lance Lawrence	Submission (rear-naked choke)	2	3:29
Flyweight	Christian Natividad	def.	Jose Sandoval	Decision (unanimous) (30–27, 30–27, 30–27)	3	5:00
Featherweight	Dakota Hope	def.	Jeremy Henry	Decision (unanimous) (30–27, 30–27, 30–27)	3	5:00
Women's Strawweight	Mackenzie Stiller	def.	Sidney Trillo	Submission (scarf hold armlock)	2	1:44
Middleweight	Jackson McVey	def.	Mataeo Garner	TKO (knee and punches)	1	1:28
Lightweight	Canon Swanson	def.	Amirkhan Buchaev	Submission (arm-triangle choke)	1	3:52
Light Heavyweight	Pedro Lay Jr.	def.	Emilio Vallecillo	TKO (punches)	1	4:49
Preliminary card (LFA Fight Network)
Flyweight	Tyler Forsythe	def.	Erik Calvert	Decision (unanimous) (29–28, 29–28, 29–28)	3	5:00
Featherweight	Taner Trembley	def.	Gabe Eurit	Submission (rear-naked choke)	1	2:45
Catchweight (152 lb)	Steve Collins	def.	Gaberial Brown	KO (slam)	1	2:30
Catchweight (148 lb)	Roland Pruden	def.	Alexander Schenk	Decision (unanimous) (29–28, 29–28, 29–28)	3	5:00
Bantamweight	Angelo Robles	def.	Dalton Goins	TKO (body kick and punches)	1	1:01
Amateur bouts
Welterweight	Todd Pickett	def.	Gates Cook	Submission (arm-triangle choke)	1	1:45
Catchweight (130 lb)	Eden Hall	def.	Kinnedy Hundley	Submission (arm-triangle choke)	1	1:43	(Note: Hundley missed weight (130.6 lb).)
Welterweight	Anthony McCormick	def.	Zachery Powell	TKO (punches)	2	2:40
Flyweight	Scott Calvert	def.	Eric Sanchez	TKO (ankle injury)	2	1:15

== LFA 211: Mesquita vs. Dinwoodie ==
LFA 211: Mesquita vs. Dinwoodie
- Promotion: Legacy Fighting Alliance
- Date: June 20, 2025
- Venue: Seneca Allegany Resort and Casino
- City: Salamanca, New York, United States

LFA 211: Mesquita vs. Dinwoodie was a mixed martial arts event promoted by Legacy Fighting Alliance that took place on June 20, 2025, in Salamanca, New York, United States.

=== Background ===
The event marked the promotion's second visit to Salamanca and first since LFA 189 in August 2024.

A LFA Women's Bantamweight Championship bout for the vacant title between multiple-time World Jiu-jitsu Champion Beatriz Mesquita and Sierra Dinwoodie headlined the event.

=== Results ===
Main card (UFC Fight Pass)
Weight class				Method	Round	Time	Notes
Women's Bantamweight	Beatriz Mesquita	def.	Sierra Dinwoodie	TKO (punches)	2	3:05	(Note: For the vacant LFA Women's Bantamweight Championship.)
Flyweight	Phumi Nkuta	def.	Cody Davis	Decision (unanimous) (29–28, 29–28, 29–28)	3	5:00
Women's Strawweight	Giovanna Canuto	def.	Flor Hernandez	Submission (armbar)	1	1:49
Lightweight	JaCobi Jones	def.	Shovkhal Churchaev	Decision (unanimous) (30–26, 30–26, 30–27)	3	5:00
Lightweight	Adam Livingston	def.	Hugo Oyarzún	TKO (doctor stoppage)	2	5:00
Bantamweight	Lucas Seibert	def.	Gustavo Kruger	TKO (elbow and punches)	1	2:24	(Note: Seibert missed weight (137.6 lb).)
Preliminary card (LFA Fight Network)
Welterweight	Farman Hasanov	def.	Marc-Ari Lewis	TKO (punches)	2	3:28
Middleweight	Jake Woodley	def.	David Gladfelter	Decision (unanimous) (30–27, 30–27, 30–27)	3	5:00
Lightweight	Kevin Carrier	def.	Dey McIntosh	Submission (guillotine choke)	3	4:34	(Note: McIntosh missed weight (157 lb).)
Featherweight	Soufiane Kabil	def.	Derrick Patterson	Decision (unanimous) (30–27, 30–27, 30–27)	3	5:00
Catchweight (165 lb)	Elton Dedaj	def.	Zaki Mohsin	Submission (triangle choke)	2	2:16

== LFA 212: Degli vs. Severino ==
LFA 212: Degli vs. Severino
- Promotion: Legacy Fighting Alliance
- Date: July 11, 2025
- Venue: Ulysses Guimarães Convention Center
- City: Brasília, Brazil

LFA 212: Degli vs. Severino was a mixed martial arts event promoted by Legacy Fighting Alliance that took place on July 11, 2025, in Brasília, Brazil.

=== Background ===
An interim LFA Flyweight Championship bout between the title holder Marcos Degli and Oscar Miguel was scheduled to headline the event. However, Miguel pulled out from the bout and was replaced by Matheus da Silva Severino.

=== Results ===
Main card (UFC Fight Pass)
Weight class				Method	Round	Time	Notes
Flyweight	Marcos Degli (ic)	def.	Matheus da Silva Severino	KO (punches)	3	2:44	(Note: For the interim LFA Flyweight Championship.)
Middleweight	Claudio Ribeiro	def.	Diego Dias	TKO (punches)	1	4:32
Lightweight	Juliano Prescendo	def.	Samuel Dias	Decision (unanimous) (29–28, 29–28, 29–28)	3	5:00
Women's Strawweight	Nawira Ferreira	def.	Marina Monteiro	Decision (unanimous) (30–27, 30–26, 30–25)	3	5:00
Flyweight	Lucas Gouveia	def.	Luiz Felipe Herculano	KO (punch)	1	1:54
Featherweight	Leonardo Cerboni	def.	João Pedro Moreira	Decision (unanimous) (29–28, 29–28, 29–28)	3	5:00
Preliminary card (LFA Fight Network)
Middleweight	Marcio Augusto Cabral	def.	Mailton Azavedo	KO (knee)	1	0:42
Women's Flyweight	Beatriz Consuli Diniz	def.	Naiane Silva Sá	TKO (punches)	1	3:08
Welterweight	Gabriel Vinicius	def.	Lucas Matheus Tenorio	Submission (anaconda choke)	1	1:08
Featherweight	Aristides Vinícius	def.	Jhonatan Santos Cordeiro	TKO (knee and punches)	2	2:16
Flyweight	Cláudio Bento de Meireles	def.	Neto Pinheiro	TKO (punches)	2	4:36
Women's Bantamweight	Ramana Toscanelli	def.	Karol Pereira Silva	Submission (arm-triangle choke)	2	4:28
Women's Strawweight	Júlia Barros	def.	Radija Aquino	Decision (unanimous) (29–28, 29–28, 29–28)	3	5:00

== LFA 213: Gonzalez vs. Rosales ==
LFA 213: Gonzalez vs. Rosales
- Promotion: Legacy Fighting Alliance
- Date: July 26, 2025
- Venue: Tachi Palace Casino Resort
- City: Lemoore, California, United States

LFA 213: Gonzalez vs. Rosales was a mixed martial arts event promoted by Legacy Fighting Alliance that took place on July 26, 2025, in Lemoore, California, United States.

=== Background ===
A featherweight bout between Erick Visconde and Chris Mecate was scheduled to headline the event. However, Mecate withdrew from the event due to an emergency procedure to correct a minor medical concern. As a results, a bantamweight bout between Rafael do Nascimento and Arnold Jimenez was promoted to new main event instead. In turn, Jiminez withdrew from the event before the event started due to illness. Therefore, a lightweight bout between Bellator veterans Chris Gonzalez and Jacob Rosales was elevated to the new main event instead.

=== Results ===
Main card (UFC Fight Pass)
Weight class				Method	Round	Time	Notes
Lightweight	Chris Gonzalez	def.	Jacob Rosales	Decision (unanimous) (30–27, 30–27, 29–28)	3	5:00
Catchweight (150 lb)	Isaac Thomson	def.	Jeremy Henry	Submission (rear-naked choke)	1	2:34
Lightweight	Loai Abushaar	def.	Edmund Kwan	KO (knee)	1	0:51
Lightweight	BeyNoah	def.	Cedric Manhoef	KO (punch)	3	0:49
Light Heavyweight	Shealor Ladd	def.	Pedro Lay Jr.	TKO (punches)	1	4:23
Catchweight (140 lb)	Corvan Allen	def.	José Alejandro Avalos	Decision (unanimous) (30–27, 30–27, 29–28)	3	5:00
Women's Strawweight	Gabrielle McComb	def.	Cara Greenwell	Submission (armbar)	2	4:28
Preliminary card (LFA Fight Network)
Lightweight	Benjamin Orozco	def.	Sczar Charles	Submission (rear-naked choke)	1	2:20
Women's Strawweight	Naomie Young	def.	Alandria Rosales	Submission (armbar)	1	4:02	(Note: Young missed weight (116.4 lb).)

== LFA 214: Fernando vs. Latu ==
LFA 214: Fernando vs. Latu
- Promotion: Legacy Fighting Alliance
- Date: August 15, 2025
- Venue: Sanford Pentagon
- City: Sioux Falls, South Dakota, United States

LFA 214: Fernando vs. Latu was a mixed martial arts event promoted by Legacy Fighting Alliance that took place on August 15, 2025, in Sioux Falls, South Dakota, United States.

=== Background ===
A LFA Light Heavyweight Championship for the vacant title between former LFA Middleweight Champion Lucas Fernando and Phillip Latu headlined the event. In addition, a LFA Middleweight Championship bout for the vacant title between undefeated prospects David Allakhverdiev and John Moore served as the co-main event.

=== Results ===
Main card (UFC Fight Pass)
Weight class				Method	Round	Time	Notes
Light Heavyweight	Lucas Fernando	def.	Phillip Latu	TKO (punches)	1	1:03	(Note: For the vacant LFA Light Heavyweight Championship.)
Middleweight	David Allakhverdiev	def.	John Moore	KO (punch)	1	1:03	(Note: For the vacant LFA Middleweight Championship.)
Lightweight	Abdisalam Kubanychbek	def.	André Borges	Decision (unanimous) (30–27, 30–27, 30–27)	3	5:00
Heavyweight	Bevon Lewis	def.	Devin Clark	Decision (split) (29–28, 28–29, 29–28)	3	5:00
Lightweight	Dzhamal Mavliudov	def.	Triston Gwaltney	TKO (punches)	1	2:25
Featherweight	Ansar Khamzaev	def.	Andy Waters	Decision (unanimous) (30–27, 30–26, 29–27)	3	5:00
Preliminary card (LFA Fight Network)
Middleweight	Brady Minner	def.	Dylan Diebitz	Submission (triangle choke)	2	1:57
Women's Bantamweight	Nikola Kacperska	def.	Lizzy Gevers	Decision (split) (30–27, 28–29, 30–27)	3	5:00	(Note: Kacperska missed weight (137 lb).)
Amateur bouts
Catchweight (160 lb)	Brett Bye	def.	Isaiah Skidmore	TKO (punches)	2	1:36
Lightweight	Gift Harding	def.	Reed Bleymeyer	Submission (ninja choke)	1	2:45
Welterweight	Anyuon Atem	def.	Steve Larson	Decision (unanimous) (30–27, 30–27, 29–28)	3	3:00

== LFA 215: Miranda vs. Barzilay ==
LFA 215: Miranda vs. Barzilay
- Promotion: Legacy Fighting Alliance
- Date: August 22, 2025
- Venue: Ventura County Fairgrounds
- City: Ventura, California, United States

LFA 215: Miranda vs. Barzilay was a mixed martial arts event promoted by Legacy Fighting Alliance that took place on August 22, 2025, in Ventura, California, United States.

=== Background ===
The event marked the promotion's first visit to Ventura.

A LFA Lightweight Championship bout between current champion Richie Miranda and undefeated prospect Ilay Barzilay headlined the event. In addition, a LFA Flyweight Championship bout between current champion Eduardo Henrique and Devon Lozej served as the co-main event.

=== Results ===
Main card (UFC Fight Pass)
Weight class				Method	Round	Time	Notes
Lightweight	Richie Miranda (c)	def.	Ilay Barzilay	Decision (unanimous) (49–46, 49–46, 49–46)	5	5:00	(Note: For the LFA Lightweight Championship.)
Flyweight	Eduardo Henrique (c)	def.	Devon Lozej	KO (punch)	1	2:57	(Note: For the LFA Flyweight Championship.)
Bantamweight	Shuya Kamikubo	def.	Eric Shelton	Submission (rear-naked choke)	2	1:46	(Note: Shelton missed weight (136.4 lb).)
Catchweight (150 lb)	Erick Visconde	def.	Chris Mecate	TKO (doctor stoppage)	2	5:00
Flyweight	Adrian Garcia	def.	Michael Reyes	Decision (unanimous) (29–28, 29–28, 29–28)	3	5:00
Catchweight (140 lb)	Rafael do Nascimento	def.	Arnold Jimenez	Submission (ninja choke)	1	1:08
Preliminary card (LFA Fight Network)
Featherweight	Roman Puga	def.	Raul Navarrette	TKO (punches)	1	1:10
Women's Flyweight	Nejra Repp	def.	Lídia Helena	KO (punch)	2	0:55
Catchweight (130 lb)	Mariana Poltronieri Piccolo	def.	Natalya Speece	Submission (rear-naked choke)	1	3:15	(Note: Speece missed weight (133.4 lb).)

== LFA 216: Silva vs. Bertolso ==
LFA 216: Silva vs. Bertolso
- Promotion: Legacy Fighting Alliance
- Date: September 5, 2025
- Venue: Musiva Cuiabá
- City: Cuiabá, Brazil

LFA 216: Silva vs. Bertolso was a mixed martial arts event promoted by Legacy Fighting Alliance that took place on September 5, 2025, in Cuiabá, Brazil.

=== Background ===
A LFA Women's Strawweight Championship bout between current champion Edilania da Silva and undefeated prospect Aieza Ramos Bertolso headlined the event.

=== Results ===
Main card (UFC Fight Pass)
Weight class				Method	Round	Time	Notes
Women's Strawweight	Aieza Ramos Bertolso	def.	Edilania da Silva (c)	Submission (armbar)	2	4:14	(Note: For the LFA Women's Strawweight Championship.)
Lightweight	Marcelo Marques	def.	Luis Felipe de Oliveira	Decision (unanimous) (30–27, 30–27, 30–27)	3	5:00
Women's Strawweight	Natalia Alves	def.	Aleksandra Savicheva	Submission (rear-naked choke)	1	4:28
Bantamweight	Rafael Pereira	def.	Felipe Pereira	Decision (unanimous) (29–28, 29–28, 29–28)	3	5:00
Middleweight	Douglas da Lapa	def.	Jonathan Elias Machado	TKO (punches)	2	1:43
Bantamweight	Daniel Araújo	def.	Thomas Bryan	TKO (punches)	1	1:28	(Note: Bryan missed weight (139 lb).)
Preliminary card (LFA Fight Network)
Featherweight	Eduardo Fiuza Dutra	def.	Jeferson Santos Barbosa	Submission (rear-naked choke)	2	1:53
Light Heavyweight	Levi Rodrigues	def.	Alan Ribeiro	KO (punches)	1	2:47
Bantamweight	Marcos Aurélio	def.	André Luis Rodrigues	TKO (elbow and punches)	1	4:27
Featherweight	Henrique Barbosa Castro	def.	Wily Pereira	TKO (punches)	1	3:24
Lightweight	Italo Cruz	def.	Rodrigo Cirino Paiva	TKO (punches)	1	1:54
Bantamweight	Neto Lopes	def.	Thiago Pereira de Oliveira	TKO (spinning backfist and punches)	2	0:17
Bantamweight	Maycon Douglas Siqueira	def.	Joseph Yohan	Submission (rear-naked choke)	1	4:54	(Note: Yohan missed weight (138 lb).)

== LFA 217: McKee vs. Nobre ==
LFA 217: McKee vs. Nobre
- Promotion: Legacy Fighting Alliance
- Date: September 12, 2025
- Venue: Mystic Lake Casino Hotel
- City: Prior Lake, Minnesota, United States

LFA 217: McKee vs. Nobre was a mixed martial arts event promoted by Legacy Fighting Alliance that took place on September 12, 2025, in Prior Lake, Minnesota, United States.

=== Background ===
A bantamweight bout between undefeated prospect Mitchell McKee and Christian Strong was scheduled to headline the event. However, Strong pulled out from the event and was replaced by Pedro Nobre.

In addition, 2020 Olympic gold medalist in freestyle wrestling Gable Steveson made his MMA debut against Braden Peterson in a heavyweight bout at this event.

=== Results ===
Main card (UFC Fight Pass)
Weight class				Method	Round	Time	Notes
Catchweight (140 lb)	Mitchell McKee	def.	Pedro Nobre	KO (punch)	2	3:02
Heavyweight	Gable Steveson	def.	Braden Peterson	TKO (punches)	1	1:38
Women's Flyweight	Cheyanne Bowers	def.	Maritza Sanchez	Submission (rear-naked choke)	1	4:30
Lightweight	Nikita Kulshin	def.	Bobby Lee	Decision (unanimous) (30–27, 30–27, 30–27)	3	5:00
Welterweight	Christian Turner	def.	Joey Hart	Submission (ninja choke)	1	3:51
Featherweight	Santos Verdinez	def.	Alex Coover	Decision (unanimous) (30–27, 29–28, 29–28)	3	5:00
Women's Strawweight	Mackenzie Stiller	def.	Cristina Brador	Submission (bulldog choke)	1	4:33
Preliminary card (LFA Fight Network)
Light Heavyweight	Glendal Whitney	def.	Isaiah Pinson	TKO (submission to punches)	1	0:55
Lightweight	Kelton Sneve	def.	David McKinney	Submission (armbar)	1	1:03
Heavyweight	Ezayah Gomez Oropeza	def.	Adam Poulin	Decision (unanimous) (30–27, 29–28, 29–28)	3	5:00
Lightweight	Mitchell Wilson	def.	Alex Alejendre	Submission (rear-naked choke)	1	1:30
Amateur bouts
Middleweight	Tyree Overton	def.	Eli Pokorny	TKO (punches)	2	0:29
Lightweight	Xavier Judge	def.	Tommy Nabity	TKO (head kick and punches)	1	0:28
Featherweight	Clay Larsen	def.	Luke Powers	TKO (corner stoppage)	2	3:00

== LFA 218: Nascimento vs. Makaev ==
LFA 218: Nascimento vs. Makaev
- Promotion: Legacy Fighting Alliance
- Date: September 27, 2025
- Venue: Pabellón Insular Santiago Martín
- City: Tenerife, Spain

LFA 218: Nascimento vs. Makaev was a mixed martial arts event promoted by Legacy Fighting Alliance that took place on September 27, 2025, in Tenerife, Spain.

=== Background ===
The event marked the promotion's debut in Spain, which made his first event to held in European region.

An interim LFA Lightweight Championship bout between the title holder Jefferson Nascimento and Baysangur Makaev headlined the event.

=== Results ===
Main card (UFC Fight Pass)
Weight class				Method	Round	Time	Notes
Lightweight	Jefferson Nascimento (ic)	def.	Baysangur Makaev	Decision (unanimous) (48–47, 48–47, 49–46)	5	5:00	(Note: For the interim LFA Lightweight Championship.)
Catchweight (150 lb)	Lucas Almeida	def.	Walter Cogliandro	Submission (rear-naked choke)	1	3:01	(Note: Cogliandro missed weight (151 lb).)
Welterweight	Alvi Dasuyev	def.	Danila Prikaza	TKO (flying switch kick and punches)	3	2:56
Bantamweight	Gocha Shainidze	def.	Magomed Nazurov	Decision (split) (29–28, 28–29, 30–27)	3	5:00
Middleweight	Guilherme Soares	def.	Robin Roos	Decision (unanimous) (29–28, 29–28, 29–28)	3	5:00
Lightweight	Daniel Holt	def.	Oscar Mendez	TKO (spinning back kick and punches)	1	2:49
Preliminary card (LFA Fight Network)
Bantamweight	Reda Abdellaoui	def.	Alexandre Carole	TKO (elbows)	2	0:36
Bantamweight	Gheorghe Grozav	def.	Santhiago Paiva da Frota	Technical Submission (rear-naked choke)	1	3:33
Heavyweight	Malick Badiane	def.	Bruno Susano	TKO (punches)	1	1:00
Featherweight	Ole Hetleflåt	def.	Joan Rodriguez	Submission (north-south choke)	1	3:13

== LFA 219: Thomson vs. Islomboev ==
LFA 219: Thomson vs. Islomboev
- Promotion: Legacy Fighting Alliance
- Date: October 10, 2025
- Venue: F&M Bank Arena
- City: Clarksville, Tennessee, United States

LFA 219: Thomson vs. Islomboev was a mixed martial arts event promoted by Legacy Fighting Alliance that took place on October 10, 2025, in Clarksville, Tennessee, United States.

=== Background ===
The event marked the promotion's first visit to Clarksville.

A featherweight bout between Isaac Thomson and Akbarjon Islomboev headlined the event.

=== Results ===
Main card (UFC Fight Pass)
Weight class				Method	Round	Time	Notes
Featherweight	Isaac Thomson	def.	Akbarjon Islomboev	Decision (split) (29–28, 28–29, 29–28)	3	5:00
Welterweight	Martin Camilo	def.	Raheam Forest	KO (elbows and punches)	1	3:39	(Note: Forest missed weight (172.4 lb).)
Lightweight	Dedrek Sanders	def.	Dzhamal Mavliudov	TKO (punches and elbows)	3	2:36	(Note: Mavliudov missed weight (157 lb))
Welterweight	Andrew Stewart	def.	Johnathan Waid	Decision (unanimous) (30–27, 30–27, 30–27)	3	5:00
Heavyweight	Matt Adams	def.	Ben Wunder	TKO (punches)	1	4:01
Welterweight	Ronald Humphrey	def.	Dupree Stewart	TKO (punches)	1	3:11
Featherweight	Elias Rodriguez	def.	Dylan Booker	KO (punch)	1	3:43
Preliminary card (LFA Fight Network)
Flyweight	Bryce Woerner	def.	Trevor Grice	Submission (rear-naked choke)	2	4:50
Light Heavyweight	Finn Martin	def.	Trevor Linderman	TKO (punches)	1	4:22
Featherweight	Carter Beekman	def.	Adrian Thomas	Technical Submission (ninja choke)	2	0:37
Lightweight	Lane Roe	def.	Sergio Martinez	TKO (corner stoppage)	1	5:00
Amateur bouts
Flyweight	Jaime Lloyd	def.	Tyler Hilliard	TKO (punches)	2	2:08
Catchweight (140 lb)	Sammy Shires	def.	Hunter Anderson	KO (punches)	2	0:23

== LFA 220: Tanner vs. Cyr ==
LFA 220: Tanner vs. Cyr
- Promotion: Legacy Fighting Alliance
- Date: October 25, 2025
- Venue: Arizona Financial Theatre
- City: Phoenix, Arizona, United States

LFA 220: Tanner vs. Cyr was a mixed martial arts event promoted by Legacy Fighting Alliance that took place on October 25, 2025, in Phoenix, Arizona, United States.

=== Background ===
A bantamweight bout between Kasey Tanner and Michael Cyr headlined the event.

=== Results ===
Main card (UFC Fight Pass)
Weight class				Method	Round	Time	Notes
Bantamweight	Kasey Tanner	def.	Michael Cyr	Decision (unanimous) (30–27, 30–27, 30–27)	3	5:00
Flyweight	Christian Natividad	def.	Jostin Quilca	TKO (punches)	1	3:07
Flyweight	Ernesto Ibarra	def.	Kyle Estrada	TKO (knee and punches)	1	4:02	(Note: Estrada missed weight (128.6 lb).)
Bantamweight	Ryan Kuse	def.	Kevin Natividad	Decision (unanimous) (29–28, 29–28, 29–28)	3	5:00
Flyweight	Chance Ikei	def.	Jordan Burkholder	Submission (rear-naked choke)	1	4:50	(Note: Ikei missed weight (126.4 lb).)
Women's Strawweight	Leslie Hernandez	def.	Flor Hernandez	Decision (unanimous) (30–27, 30–27, 30–27)	3	5:00
Preliminary card (LFA Fight Network)
Flyweight	Lívio Ribeiro	def.	Richard Mahan	Submission (rear-naked choke)	1	2:36
Middleweight	Jarom Woodbury	def.	David Gladfelter	Decision (unanimous) (29–28, 29–28, 29–28)	3	5:00
Middleweight	Delton Kaufmann	def.	Caleb Jensen	TKO (elbows and punches)	1	3:08
Bantamweight	Nolan Linebaugh	def.	Will Hughes	Decision (unanimous) (30–27, 30–27, 29–28)	3	5:00
Amateur bouts
Lightweight	Alex Ortiz	def.	Matthew Chenault	TKO (punches)	3	1:13	(Note: Ortiz missed weight (157.6 lb).)
Catchweight (180 lb)	Quayshan Randelson	def.	Issouf Doumbia	KO (punches)	2	0:56
Heavyweight	Brayan Mancilla	def.	Emmanuel Hill	TKO (punches)	1	0:28

== LFA 221: Clark vs. Consuli ==
LFA 221: Clark vs. Consuli
- Promotion: Legacy Fighting Alliance
- Date: November 7, 2025
- Venue: Nilson Nelson Gymnasium
- City: Brasília, Brazil

LFA 221: Clark vs. Consuli was a mixed martial arts event promoted by Legacy Fighting Alliance that took place on November 7, 2025, in Brasília, Brazil.

=== Background ===
A LFA Women's Flyweight Championship bout between current champion Shannon Clark and undefeated prospect Beatriz Consuli headlined the event.

In addition, a LFA Women's Bantamweight Championship bout for the vacant title between undefeated prospect Nicoly Pedroza and Myllena Messias was scheduled to co-headline the event, but it never materialized after Messias' illness.

=== Results ===
Main card (UFC Fight Pass)
Weight class				Method	Round	Time	Notes
Women's Flyweight	Shannon Clark (c)	def.	Beatriz Consuli	Decision (unanimous) (48–47, 49–46, 49–46)	5	5:00	(Note: For the LFA Women's Flyweight Championship.)
Welterweight	Richard Martins	def.	Argemiro Delmandes	TKO (retirement)	1	5:00	(Note: Delmandes missed weight (174 lb).)
Welterweight	Reginaldo Geraldo Jr.	def.	Natanael de Souza Mota	Submission (brabo choke)	3	4:46
Featherweight	Luan Pedroso	def.	Diogo Sotero	Decision (unanimous) (30–27, 30–27, 30–25)	3	5:00
Flyweight	Lucas Gouveia	def.	Jean Sevalho	Decision (majority) (29–27, 29–27, 28–28)	3	5:00
Middleweight	Gustavo Guilherme Canuto	def.	Gustavo Sousa	TKO (punches)	1	0:14
Preliminary card (LFA Fight Network)
Welterweight	Gabriel Vinicius	def.	Yuri Anselmo	Submission (rear-naked choke)	1	4:33
Bantamweight	Mateus Soares	def.	Luiz Henrique Pacífico	TKO (punches)	1	4:52	(Note: Pacífico missed weight (137.8 lb).)
Bantamweight	Anderson Xavier	def.	Leandro Antunez	Decision (unanimous) (30–27, 30–27, 29–28)	3	5:00
Women's Bantamweight	Milena Galvão	def.	Ramana Toscanelli	Decision (unanimous) (30–27, 30–27, 30–27)	3	5:00
Bantamweight	Breno Yuri Santos	def.	Thiago Horácio	TKO (punches)	2	3:43	(Note: Horácio missed weight (138 lb).)
Middleweight	Helisson Cardoso	def.	Wender Batista	Decision (unanimous) (29–28, 29–28, 29–28)	3	5:00
Flyweight	Cláudio Bento de Meireles	def.	Matheus da Silva	TKO (punches to the body)	3	3:46
Lightweight	Pedro Victor de Souza	def.	Kauan Leopoldina	Decision (unanimous) (30–27, 30–27, 30–27)	3	5:00

== LFA 222: Pires vs. Belakh ==
LFA 222: Pires vs. Belakh
- Promotion: Legacy Fighting Alliance
- Date: November 14, 2025
- Venue: Foxwoods Resort Casino
- City: Mashantucket, Connecticut, United States

LFA 222: Pires vs. Belakh was a mixed martial arts event promoted by Legacy Fighting Alliance that took place on November 14, 2025, in Mashantucket, Connecticut, United States.

=== Background ===
A LFA Bantamweight Championship bout between current champion Vinicius Pires and Artem Belakh headlined the event.

=== Results ===
Main card (UFC Fight Pass)
Weight class				Method	Round	Time	Notes
Bantamweight	Artem Belakh	def.	Vinicius Pires (c)	Decision (unanimous) (49–46, 48–47, 48–47)	5	5:00	(Note: For the LFA Bantamweight Championship.)
Lightweight	Joe Giannetti	vs.	José Ferreira Muñoz	No Contest (accidental eye poke)	2	0:41	(Note: Accidental eye poke rendered Giannetti unable to continue.)
Featherweight	Gustavo Pintos	def.	Regivaldo Carvalho	Decision (unanimous) (30–27, 30–27, 30–27)	3	5:00
Lightweight	Nathan Ghareeb	def.	Josh Harvey	TKO (knee to the body and elbows)	2	2:58
Women's Flyweight	Aline Pereira	def.	Nejra Repp	Decision (unanimous) (30–27, 30–27, 30–27)	3	5:00
Preliminary card (LFA Fight Network)
Catchweight (130 lb)	Adrian Garcia	def.	Yermakhan Oryntaev	KO (punch)	1	0:36
Lightweight	Ansar Khamzaev	def.	Edens Charles	KO (punches)	1	0:35
Welterweight	Jonathan Di Lorenzo	def.	Elton Dedaj	Submission (arm-triangle choke)	1	3:45
Welterweight	Melvin Jovel	def.	Tyler Peterick	TKO (punches)	1	0:47

== LFA 223: Francischinelli vs. Piersma ==
LFA 223: Francischinelli vs. Piersma
- Promotion: Legacy Fighting Alliance
- Date: November 21, 2025
- Venue: Seneca Niagara Casino & Hotel
- City: Niagara Falls, New York, United States

LFA 223: Francischinelli vs. Piersma was a mixed martial arts event promoted by Legacy Fighting Alliance that took place on November 21, 2025, in Niagara Falls, New York, United States.

=== Background ===
A LFA Welterweight Championship bout for the vacant title between Luis Francischinelli and Jonathan Piersma headlined the event.

=== Results ===
Main card (UFC Fight Pass)
Weight class				Method	Round	Time	Notes
Welterweight	Jonathan Piersma	def.	Luis Francischinelli	Submission (rear-naked choke)	3	1:22	(Note: For the vacant LFA Welterweight Championship.)
Welterweight	Jeff Creighton	def.	Diego Bianchini	Decision (unanimous) (29–28, 29–28, 29–28)	3	5:00
Lightweight	Steve Collins	def.	Kyle Pufahl	TKO (punches)	1	4:01
Light Heavyweight	Joe Taylor	def.	Shealor Ladd	KO (punch)	1	0:35
Featherweight	Taner Trembley	def.	Cole Alaxanian	Submission (guillotine choke)	3	3:57
Lightweight	Kelton Sneve	def.	Kevin Carrier	Decision (unanimous) (29–28, 30–27, 30–27)	3	5:00
Women's Strawweight	Jayde Sheeley	vs.	Aline David	Draw (unanimous) (28–28, 28–28, 28–28)	3	5:00	(Note: David was deducted one point in round 1 due to an illegal elbow to back of the head.)
Preliminary card (LFA Fight Network)
Welterweight	Farman Hasanov	def.	Abdurakhmon Fazilov	TKO (doctor stoppage)	1	4:58
Middleweight	Jake Woodley	def.	Adland Benson	TKO (punches and elbows)	1	4:37
Heavyweight	Richard Harris	def.	Alex Marro	KO (punch)	1	2:17
Bantamweight	Sebastian Ruiz	def.	Nick Eldridge	TKO (punch)	2	1:26
Catchweight (190 lb)	Travon Eller	def.	Mus'Aib Baiyina	TKO (slam and punches)	1	0:29	(Note: Baiyina missed weight (196.2 lb).)
Women's Bantamweight	Hope Chase	def.	Nikola Kacperska	Decision (split) (29–28, 28–29, 29–28)	3	5:00	(Note: Kacperska missed weight (138.8 lb).)

== See also ==
- 2025 in UFC
- 2025 in Professional Fighters League
- 2025 in ONE Championship
- 2025 in Absolute Championship Akhmat
- 2025 in Konfrontacja Sztuk Walki
- 2025 in Rizin Fighting Federation
- 2025 in LUX Fight League
- 2025 in Oktagon MMA
- 2025 in Brave Combat Federation
- 2025 in UAE Warriors
- 2025 in Cage Warriors
