= Chris Gonzalez =

American mixed martial arts (MMA) fighter

Christopher Gonzalez
- Born: July 29, 1991 (age 35); Chicago, Illinois, U.S.
- Height: 5 ft 11 in (1.80 m)
- Weight: 155 lb (70 kg; 11.1 st)
- Division: Lightweight
- Reach: 73 in (185 cm)
- Fighting out of: Sacramento, California, U.S.
- Team: Team Alpha Male (2017–present); NYAC (wrestling)
- Wrestling: Greco-Roman wrestling NJCAA wrestling
- Years active: 2018–present

Mixed martial arts record
- Total: 12
- Wins: 8
- By knockout: 3
- By submission: 1
- By decision: 4
- Losses: 4
- By knockout: 1
- By submission: 1
- By decision: 2

Other information
- Mixed martial arts record from Sherdog

Matthew Christopher Gonzalez (born July 29, 1991) is an American mixed martial artist and former Greco–Roman wrestler who currently competes in the lightweight division. He has previously had a 10 bout stint in Bellator MMA. As a wrestler, Gonzalez won the 2016 senior Greco-Roman World Team Trials and went on to represent the United States at the 2016 World Championships at 71 kilograms and placed second at the 2017 US Open.

== Background ==
Gonzalez was born and raised in Chicago, Illinois, where he attended Bloom Trail High School. As a high schooler, he was a multi-sport athlete, competing in wrestling, basketball, football and track and field. Despite never qualifying for the state championships as a wrestler, being sidetracked by injuries as a junior and senior and also being a late starter in the sport, Gonzalez decided to pursue college wrestling.

After bouncing from Northern Illinois University to Harper College, Gonzalez became an NJCAA All–American in 2012. Gonzalez then accepted a scholarship to wrestle at the Northern Michigan University, which offered a Greco-Roman program. Throughout his international career, Gonzalez, who represented the New York Athletic Club, went on to make the 2016 US World Team, placing 10th at the 2016 World Championships, placed multiple times at the US Open and claimed medals from tournaments such as the Dave Schultz and Bill Farrell Memorial Internationals.

== Mixed martial arts career ==
=== Early career ===
After his performance at the 2016 US Olympic Team Trials, Gonzalez considered transitioning over to mixed martial arts, however, it was not until 2018 when he made his professional debut in the sport, winning by submission at the Gladiator Challenge.

=== Bellator MMA ===
In December 2018, it was announced that Gonzalez had signed with Bellator MMA. In January 2019 it was announced that he was scheduled to make his promotional debut against Henry Mendez at Bellator 214 on January 26, 2019. After Mendez withdrew from the bout, Gonzalez eventually made his promotional debut at Bellator 221 on May 11, 2019, defeating Charles Radtke by unanimous decision.

Gonzalez had his third professional fight at Bellator 226 when he faced Luis Vargas on September 7, 2019. He dominated the bout, heavily utilizing his wrestling to claim the win by unanimous decision.

To start off 2020, Gonzalez competed at Bellator 239 in February 21, defeating Aaron McKenzie by split decision. He then continued his win streak when he defeated Vladimir Tokov by the same method in August 21 at Bellator 244.

His first finish in the promotion came when he knocked out former UFC veteran Roger Huerta on April 2, 2021, at Bellator 255.

Gonzalez faced Goiti Yamauchi on July 31, 2021, at Bellator 263. He lost the bout via TKO in the first round.

Gonzalez faced Saad Awad on January 29, 2022, at Bellator 273. He won the bout via knockout 36 seconds into the first round.

Gonzalez faced Usman Nurmagomedov on July 22, 2022, at Bellator 283. He lost the bout via guillotine choke in the first round.

Gonzalez was scheduled to face Shamil Nikaev on December 9, 2022, at Bellator 289. However, the bout was scrapped for unknown reasons.

Gonzalez faced Max Rohskopf on February 4, 2023, at Bellator 290. He won the bout via TKO in the second round.

Gonzalez faced Tim Wilde on May 12, 2023, at Bellator 296. He lost the fight by unanimous decision.

On February 2, 2024, Gonzalez announced that he was no longer with the promotion.

== Personal life ==
Christopher's father, Gaspar Gonzalez, was born and raised in Havana, Cuba and immigrated to the United States in 1961.

== Mixed martial arts record ==
Professional record breakdown
13 matches	9 wins	4 losses
By knockout	3	1
By submission	1	1
By decision	5	2

Res.	Record	Opponent	Method	Event	Date	Round	Time	Location	Notes
Loss	9–4	Raul Tutarauli	Decision (unanimous)	Rkena FC 3	May 16, 2026	3	5:00	Tbilisi, Georgia	
Win	9–3	Jacob Rosales	Decision (unanimous)	LFA 213	July 25, 2025	3	5:00	Lemoore, California, United States	
Loss	8–3	Tim Wilde	Decision (unanimous)	Bellator 296	May 12, 2023	3	5:00	Paris, France	
Win	8–2	Max Rohskopf	TKO (punches)	Bellator 290	February 4, 2023	2	1:22	Inglewood, California, United States	
Loss	7–2	Usman Nurmagomedov	Submission (guillotine choke)	Bellator 283	July 22, 2022	1	2:54	Tacoma, Washington, United States	
Win	7–1	Saad Awad	KO (head kick and punches)	Bellator 273	January 29, 2022	1	0:36	Phoenix, Arizona, United States	
Loss	6–1	Goiti Yamauchi	TKO (punches)	Bellator 263	July 30, 2021	1	3:53	Los Angeles, California, United States	
Win	6–0	Roger Huerta	TKO (submission to punches)	Bellator 255	April 2, 2021	2	3:01	Uncasville, Connecticut, United States	Catchweight (160 lb) bout.
Win	5–0	Vladimir Tokov	Decision (split)	Bellator 244	August 21, 2020	3	2:09	Uncasville, Connecticut, United States	
Win	4–0	Aaron McKenzie	Decision (split)	Bellator 239	February 21, 2020	3	5:00	Thackerville, Oklahoma, United States	
Win	3–0	Luis Vargas	Decision (unanimous)	Bellator 226	September 7, 2019	3	5:00	San Jose, California, United States	
Win	2–0	Charlie Radtke	Decision (unanimous)	Bellator 221	May 11, 2019	3	5:00	Rosemont, Illinois, United States	
Win	1–0	Tyrese McCloud	Submission	Gladiator Challenge: Avalanche	October 20, 2018	1	1:30	Lincoln, California, United States	Lightweight debut.

== See also ==
- List of male mixed martial artists
