= 2026 European Wrestling Championships – Men's Greco-Roman 72 kg =

Men's Greco-Roman 72 kg at the 2026 European Wrestling Championships
- Venue: Tirana Olympic Park
- Location: Tirana, Albania
- Dates: 21–22 April
- Competitors: 15 from 13 nations

Medalists
gold medal	Ibrahim Ghanem	France
silver medal	Iuri Lomadze	Georgia
bronze medal	Gaspar Terteryan	Armenia
bronze medal	Cengiz Arslan	Turkey

The men's Greco-Roman 72 kilograms competition at the 2026 European Wrestling Championships was held from 21 to 22 April 2026 at the Tirana Olympic Park in Tirana, Albania.

== Results ==
Legend

- F — Won by fall

=== Main bracket ===
Round of 16
Aliaksandr Liavonchyk (UWW)	3
Kamil Czarnecki (POL)	1
Gaspar Terteryan (ARM)	6
Christoffer Dahlén (SWE)	0
Dmytro Vasyliev (UKR)	5
Ruslan Nurullayev (AZE)	9
Iuri Lomadze (GEO)	6
Kamil Akhmetvaleev (UWW)	0
Dimitar Georgiev (BUL)	0
Pavel Puklavec (CRO)	8
Cengiz Arslan (TUR)	6^{F}
João Simões (POR)	0
Mihai Petic (MDA)	0
István Váncza (HUN)	6

Quarterfinals
Ibrahim Ghanem (FRA)	4
Aliaksandr Liavonchyk (UWW)	1
Gaspar Terteryan (ARM)	1
Ruslan Nurullayev (AZE)	1
Iuri Lomadze (GEO)	11
Pavel Puklavec (CRO)	0
Cengiz Arslan (TUR)	4
István Váncza (HUN)	3

Semifinals
Ibrahim Ghanem (FRA)	6
Gaspar Terteryan (ARM)	1
Iuri Lomadze (GEO)	3
Cengiz Arslan (TUR)	2

Final
Ibrahim Ghanem (FRA)	4
Iuri Lomadze (GEO)	0

=== Repechage ===
Repechage round 1
Kamil Akhmetvaleev (UWW)	1
Pavel Puklavec (CRO)	3

Bronze medal matches
Aliaksandr Liavonchyk (UWW)	1
Gaspar Terteryan (ARM)	1
Pavel Puklavec (CRO)	6
Cengiz Arslan (TUR)	7

== Final standing ==
Rank	Wrestler
1st place, gold medalist(s)	Ibrahim Ghanem (FRA)
2nd place, silver medalist(s)	Iuri Lomadze (GEO)
3rd place, bronze medalist(s)	Gaspar Terteryan (ARM)
3rd place, bronze medalist(s)	Cengiz Arslan (TUR)
5	Aliaksandr Liavonchyk (UWW)
5	Pavel Puklavec (CRO)
7	Ruslan Nurullayev (AZE)
8	István Váncza (HUN)
9	Dmytro Vasyliev (UKR)
10	Kamil Czarnecki (POL)
11	Kamil Akhmetvaleev (UWW)
12	Christoffer Dahlén (SWE)
13	João Simões (POR)
14	Mihai Petic (MDA)
15	Dimitar Georgiev (BUL)
