= Almat Kebispayev =

Kazakhstani Greco-Roman wrestler

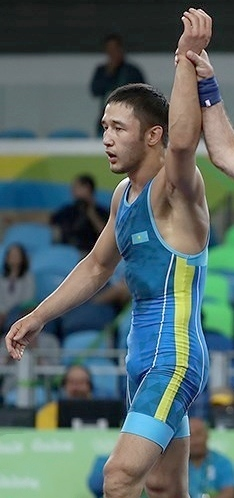
- Kebispayev at the 2016 Olympics

Personal information
- Nationality: Kazakhstan
- Born: 12 December 1987 (age 38) Urzhar, Kazakh SSR, Soviet Union
- Height: 1.66 m (5 ft 5 in)
- Weight: 65 kg (143 lb)

Sport
- Sport: Wrestling
- Event: Greco-Roman wrestling
- Coached by: Boranbek Konyratov; Rysbek Nurgazin
Medal record
Representing Kazakhstan
World Championships
Silver medal – second place	2011 Istanbul	60 kg
Bronze medal – third place	2010 Moscow	60 kg
Bronze medal – third place	2015 Las Vegas	59 kg
Bronze medal – third place	2019 Nur-Sultan	63 kg
Bronze medal – third place	2021 Oslo	67 kg
Asian Games
Silver medal – second place	2018 Jakarta	67 kg
Bronze medal – third place	2014 Incheon	59 kg
Asian Championships
Gold medal – first place	2011 Tashkent	60 kg
Gold medal – first place	2018 Bishkek	67 kg
Silver medal – second place	2009 Pattaya	60 kg
Silver medal – second place	2017 New Delhi	66 kg
Silver medal – second place	2021 Almaty	67 kg
Bronze medal – third place	2023 Astana	67 kg
Summer Universiade
Bronze medal – third place	Kazan 2013	60 kg

Almat Kabdrashevich Kebispayev (born 12 December 1987) is a Greco-Roman wrestler from Kazakhstan who competes in the 67 kg weight division. He won five medals at the world championships in 2010–2021 and competed at the 2012 and 2016 Olympics.

In 2021, he won one of the bronze medals in the 67 kg event at the Matteo Pellicone Ranking Series 2021 held in Rome, Italy.
