= 2019 European Wrestling Championships – Men's Greco-Roman 72 kg =

Van40.exe

The Men's Greco-Roman 72 kg is a competition featured at the 2019 European Wrestling Championships, and was held in Bucharest, Romania on April 13 and April 14.

== Medalists ==
Gold	Abuyazid Mantsigov; Russia
Silver	Cengiz Arslan; Turkey
Bronze	Aik Mnatsakanian; Bulgaria
Bronze	Dominik Etlinger; Croatia

== Results ==
Legend

- F — Won by fall
- WO — Won by walkover

=== Final ===
Final
Cengiz Arslan (TUR)	6
Abuyazid Mantsigov (RUS)	9

=== Top half ===
Round of 32

Round of 16
Ilie Cojocari (ROU)	4
Anton Korabau (BLR)	0
Cengiz Arslan (TUR)	9
Simon Erlandsson (SWE)	0
Mamadassa Sylla (FRA)	1
Aik Mnatsakanian (BUL)	2
Michael Widmayer (GER)	WO
Denis Horváth (SVK)

Quarterfinals
Ilie Cojocari (ROU)	4
Cengiz Arslan (TUR)	5
Aik Mnatsakanian (BUL)	1
Michael Widmayer (GER)	1

Semifinals
Cengiz Arslan (TUR)	2
Aik Mnatsakanian (BUL)	1

=== Bottom half ===
Round of 32
Mateusz Bernatek (POL)	14
Ramaz Zoidze (GEO)	5
Anatolie Popov (MDA)	0
Ulvu Ganizade (AZE)	9
Dominik Etlinger (CRO)	9
Sebastian Nađ (SRB)	1

Round of 16
Dmytro Pynkov (UKR)	0
Róbert Fritsch (HUN)	9
Abuyazid Mantsigov (RUS)	13
Hrant Kalachyan (ARM)	2
Ņikita Masjuks (LAT)	2
Mateusz Bernatek (POL)	7
Ulvu Ganizade (AZE)	2
Dominik Etlinger (CRO)	7

Quarterfinals
Róbert Fritsch (HUN)	0
Abuyazid Mantsigov (RUS)	8
Mateusz Bernatek (POL)	2
Dominik Etlinger (CRO)	4

Semifinals
Abuyazid Mantsigov (RUS)	9
Dominik Etlinger (CRO)	0

=== Repechage ===
Repechage round 1
Simon Erlandsson (SWE)	1
Ilie Cojocari (ROU)	4
Hrant Kalachyan (ARM)	8
Róbert Fritsch (HUN)	4

Bronze medal match
Ilie Cojocari (ROU)	1
Aik Mnatsakanian (BUL)	2
Hrant Kalachyan (ARM)	3
Dominik Etlinger (CRO)	4
