= Aram Vardanyan =

Uzbekistani sport wrestler (born 1995)

Personal information
- Born: 11 November 1995 (age 30) Tashkent, Uzbekistan
- Height: 1.78 m (5 ft 10 in)
- Weight: 77 kg (170 lb)

Sport
- Country: Uzbekistan
- Sport: Wrestling
- Event: Greco-Roman
Medal record
Men's Greco-Roman wrestling
Representing Uzbekistan
World Championships
Silver medal – second place	2019 Nur-Sultan	72 kg
Asian Championships
Gold medal – first place	2025 Amman	77 kg
Bronze medal – third place	2016 Bangkok	66 kg
Bronze medal – third place	2018 Bishkek	72 kg
Asian Indoor and Martial Arts Games
Bronze medal – third place	2017 Ashgabat	71kg

Aram Vardanyan (born 11 November 1995) is an Uzbek sport wrestler of Armenian descent, who competes in the men's Greco Roman category. He won the gold medal at the 2025 Asian Wrestling Championships

== Career ==
Aram Vardanyan claimed silver medal in the men's 72 kg event during the 2019 World Wrestling Championships after losing to Russia's Abuyazid Mantsigov.

He competed in the 77 kg event at the 2022 World Wrestling Championships held in Belgrade, Serbia.

He lost his bronze medal match in the 77 kg event at the 2024 Summer Olympics in Paris, France. He is cousin of Eduard Vartanyan.

In the 2025 Asian Wrestling Championships held in Amman, Jordan, after passing the first round bye, he reached the final by defeating Kazakh Ibragim Magomadov in the quarterfinals and Jordanian Amro Sadeh in the semifinals with 9-0 technical superiority. In the final match, he defeated Iranian Alireza Abdevali 4-2 and won the gold medal.
