= Tarek Benaissa =

Algerian Greco-Roman wrestler

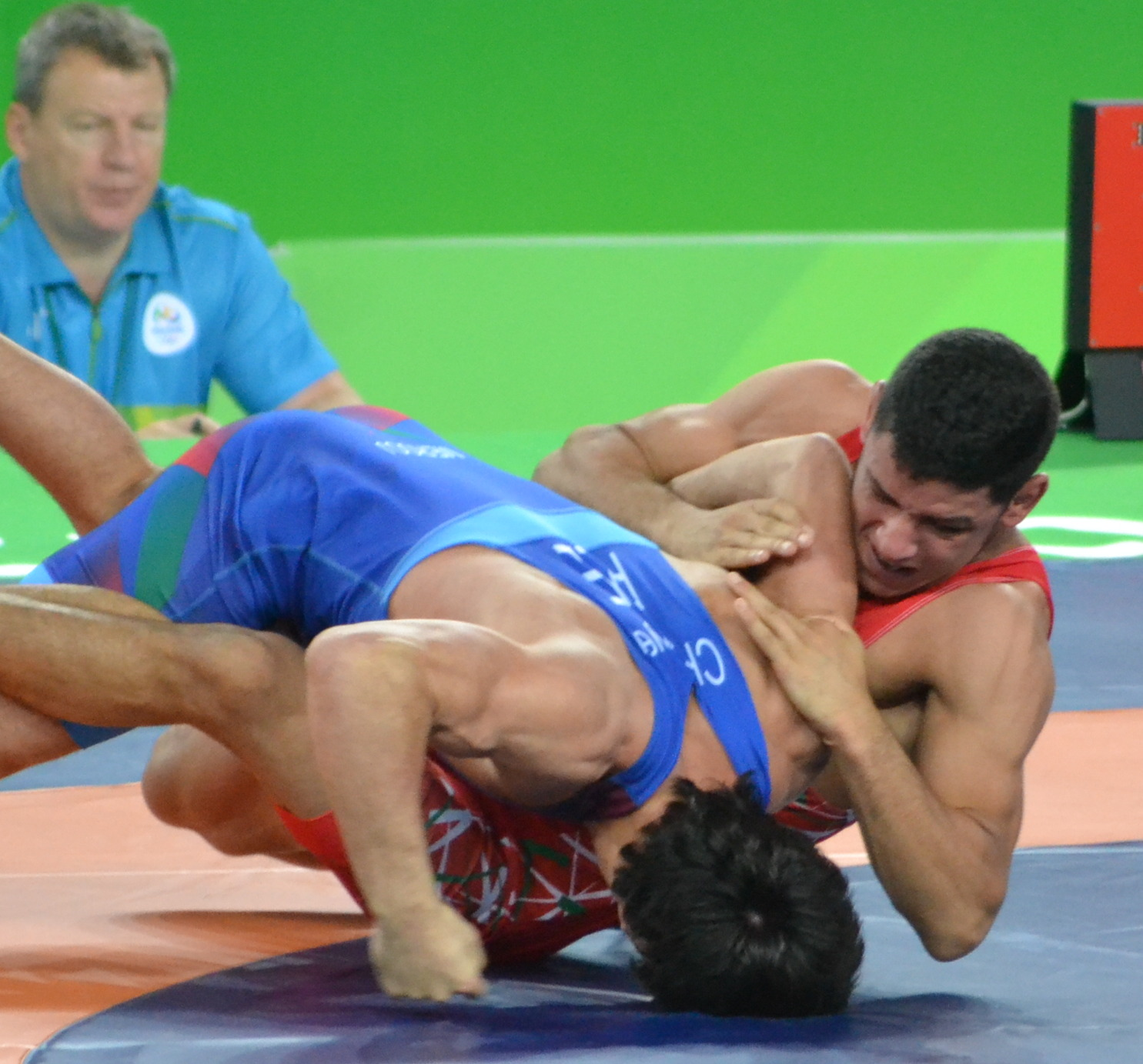
- Benaissa (red) at the 2016 Olympics

Personal information
- Full name: Tarek Aziz Benaissa
- Nationality: Algeria
- Born: 7 April 1991 (age 35) Bordj Bou Arréridj, Algeria
- Height: 170 cm (5 ft 7 in)

Sport
- Sport: Wrestling
- Event: Greco-Roman
- Club: Centre Arbee
- Coached by: Rabbah Chebbah; Bendjada Maazouz; Aoune Faycal

Tarek Aziz Benaissa (Arabic: طارق عزيز بن عيسى; born 7 April 1991) is a lightweight Greco-Roman wrestler from Algeria who competed at the 2012 and 2016 Olympics. In 2012 he received a bye for the preliminary round of sixteen, before losing out to Zaur Kuramagomedov, who scored one point each in two straight periods, leaving Benaissa without a single point. At the 2016 Rio Olympics Benaissa was eliminated in quarterfinals. At the 2015 World Wrestling Championships he lost a bronze medal match to Davor Štefanek.

== Major results ==
Year	Tournament	Venue	Result	Event
2011	Pan Arab Games	Doha, Qatar	3rd	Greco-Roman 60 kg
2012	African Championships	Marrakesh, Morocco	4th	Greco-Roman 60 kg
2012	Mediterranean Championships	Larissa, Greece	3rd	Greco-Roman 60 kg
2012	Olympic Games	(United Kingdom) London, Great Britain	15th	Greco-Roman 60 kg
2013	Mediterranean Games	Mersin, Turkey	8th	Greco-Roman 66 kg
2013	World Championships	Budapest, Hungary	34th	Greco-Roman 66 kg
2014	African Championships	Tunis, Tunisia	1st	Greco-Roman 66 kg
2014	Mediterranean Championships	Kanjiža, Serbia	3rd	Greco-Roman 66 kg
2015	African Championships	Alexandria, Egypt	3rd	Greco-Roman 66 kg
2015	World Championships	Las Vegas, United States	5th	Greco-Roman 66 kg
2015	African Games	(Republic of the Congo) Brazzaville, Congo	1st	Greco-Roman 66 kg
2015	Military World Games	Mungyeong, South Korea	13th	Greco-Roman 66 kg
2016	African Championships	Alexandria, Egypt	2nd	Greco-Roman 66 kg
2016	Olympic Games	Rio de Janeiro, Brazil	8th	Greco-Roman 66 kg
2017	African Championships	Marrakesh, Morocco	2nd	Greco-Roman 66 kg
2017	World Championships	Paris, France	16th	Greco-Roman 71 kg
2018	Mediterranean Championships	Algiers, Algeria	1st	Greco-Roman 72 kg
2018	World Championships	Budapest, Hungary	5th	Greco-Roman 72 kg
2019	African Championships	Hammamet, Tunisia	1st	Greco-Roman 72 kg
2020	African Championships	Algiers, Algeria	3rd	Greco-Roman 72 kg
