= Varsham Boranyan =

Armenian Greco-Roman wrestler (born 1988)

Varsham Boranyan Վարշամ Բորանյան
Personal information
- National team: Armenia
- Born: 4 April 1988 (age 38) Akhuryan, Armenian SSR, USSR
- Height: 1.74 m (5 ft 9 in)
- Weight: 73 kg (161 lb)

Sport
- Country: Armenia
- Sport: Wrestling
- Event: Greco-Roman
- Coached by: Aram Gasparyan
Medal record
Men's Greco-Roman wrestling
Representing Armenia
European Championships
Gold medal – first place	2016 Riga	71 kg

Varsham Boranyan (Armenian: Վարշամ Բորանյան; born 4 April 1988) is an Armenian Greco-Roman wrestler who won the gold medal at 2016 European Wrestling Championships.
