= Hasan Aliyev (wrestler) =

Azerbaijani Greco-Roman wrestler

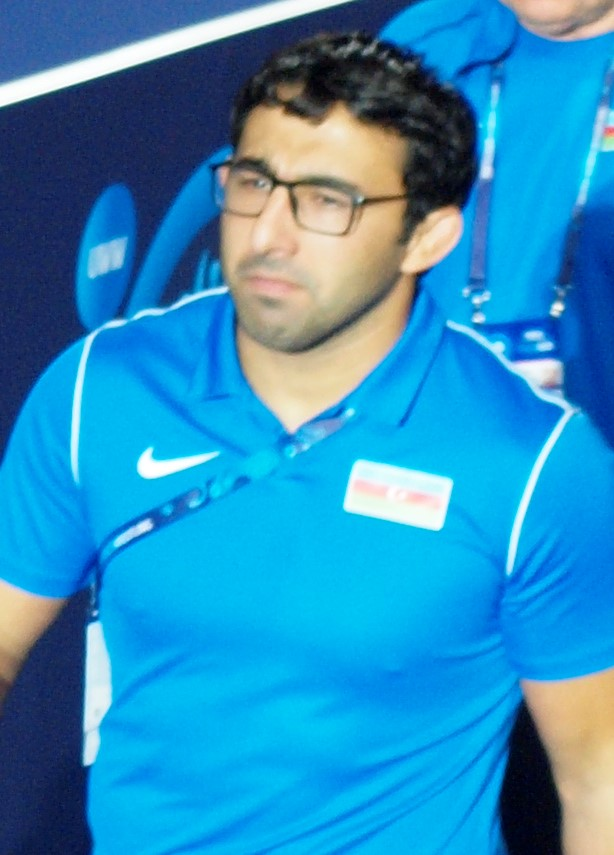

Medal record

Men's Greco-Roman wrestling

Representing Azerbaijan

World Championships
Gold medal – first place	2010 Moscow	60 kg
Bronze medal – third place	2016 Budapest	71 kg

European Championships
Gold medal – first place	2010 Baku	60 kg
Bronze medal – third place	2011 Dortmund	60 kg
Bronze medal – third place	2013 Tbilisi	66 kg
Silver medal – second place	2014 Vantaa	66 kg
Bronze medal – third place	2016 Riga	71 kg

World Cup
Gold medal – first place	2015 Tehran	Team
Bronze medal – third place	2011 Minsk	60 kg

European Games
Bronze medal – third place	2015 Baku	66 kg

Hasan Aliyev (Azerbaijani: Həsən Əliyev, born 14 November 1989 in Qazakh) is an Azerbaijani World and European champion Greco-Roman wrestler. He competed at the 2012 Summer Olympics in the men's Greco-Roman 60 kg division. At the 2012 Olympics, he beat Stig-André Berge in the last 16 and Jung Ji-hyun in the quarterfinals before losing to Revaz Lashkhi in the semifinal. He was entered into the repechage, where he lost his bronze medal match to Zaur Kuramagomedov.
