= Murat Dağ =

Turkish Greco-Roman wrestler (born 1994)

Personal information
- Nationality: Turkish
- Born: 25 May 1994 (age 32) Acıpayam, Denizli, Turkey

Sport
- Country: Turkey
- Sport: Wrestling
- Event: Greco-Roman
- Club: Ankara ASKİ
Medal record
Men's Greco-Roman wrestling
Representing Turkey
World U23 Championships
Bronze medal – third place	2023	71 kg
Islamic Solidarity Games
Bronze medal – third place	2021 Konya	72 kg

Murat Dağ (born 25 May 1994) is a Turkish Greco-Roman wrestler. He won a bronze medal at the 2021 Islamic Solidarity Games in Konya and a bronze at the World U23 Championships.

== Career ==
Dağ was born in Acıpayam, Denizli, and wrestled for Ankara ASKİ. Competing at 72 kg, he took the bronze medal at the 2021 Islamic Solidarity Games on home mat in Konya.

At the World U23 Championships in Poland he won a bronze medal at 71 kg, beating a Russian opponent in the bronze-medal bout.
