= Abuyazid Mantsigov =

Russian sport wrestler

Personal information
- Full name: Abuyazid Ruslanovich Mantsigov
- Nationality: (Russia) Russian
- Born: 28 July 1993 (age 32) Vladimir, Vladimir Oblast, Russia
- Height: 1.75 m (5 ft 9 in)
- Weight: 72 kg (159 lb)

Sport
- Country: Russia
- Sport: Wrestling
- Event: Greco-Roman
- Coached by: Bislan Albukaev and Nadir Magomedov
Medal record
Men's Greco-Roman wrestling
Representing Russia
World Championships
Gold medal – first place	2019 Nur-Sultan	72 kg
European Championships
Gold medal – first place	2019 Bucharest	72 kg
World Cup
Gold medal – first place	2017 Abadan	Team
Silver medal – second place	2014 Tehran	Team
Silver medal – second place	2016 Shiraz	Team

Abuyazid Ruslanovich Mantsigov (Russian: Абуязид Русланович Манцигов; born 28 July 1993 in Vladimir, Vladimir Oblast) is a Russian former greco-roman wrestler of Chechen descent, who competes in the men's Greco Roman category and a current world champion in the men's 72 kg Greco Roman event. He claimed gold medal in the men's 72 kg event during the 2019 World Wrestling Championships.
