= Dominik Etlinger =

Croatian Greco-Roman wrestler

Personal information
- Born: 19 February 1992 (age 34)
- Height: 170 cm (5 ft 7 in)

Sport
- Country: Croatia
- Sport: Amateur wrestling
- Event: Greco-Roman
Medal record
Men's Greco-Roman wrestling
Representing Croatia
European Games
Bronze medal – third place	2015 Baku	71 kg
European Championships
Bronze medal – third place	2019 Bucharest	72 kg
Grand Prix
Bronze medal – third place	2025 Zagreb	67 kg

Dominik Etlinger (born 19 February 1992) is a Croatian Greco-Roman wrestler. He won one of the bronze medals in the 72 kg event at the 2019 European Wrestling Championships held in Bucharest, Romania.

In 2015, Etlinger won one of the bronze medals in the 71 kg event at the European Games held in Baku, Azerbaijan.

He competed at the 2024 European Wrestling Olympic Qualification Tournament in Baku, Azerbaijan hoping to qualify for the 2024 Summer Olympics in Paris, France. He was eliminated in his first match and he did not qualify for the Olympics. Etlinger also competed at the 2024 World Wrestling Olympic Qualification Tournament held in Istanbul, Turkey without qualifying for the Olympics.

== Achievements ==
Year	Tournament	Location	Result	Event
2015	European Games	Baku, Azerbaijan	3rd	Greco-Roman 71 kg
2019	European Championships	Bucharest, Romania	3rd	Greco-Roman 72 kg
