= Aleksandar Maksimović =

Serbian Greco-Roman wrestler (born 1988)

Personal information
- Born: 26 February 1988 (age 38) Belgrade, SR Serbia, Yugoslavia
Medal record
Men's Greco-Roman wrestling
Representing Serbia
European Championships
Silver medal – second place	2016 Riga	71 kg
Bronze medal – third place	2011 Dortmund	66 kg
Bronze medal – third place	2012 Belgrade	66 kg
Bronze medal – third place	2017 Novi Sad	71 kg
Mediterranean Games
Silver medal – second place	2009 Pescara	66 kg
Silver medal – second place	2013 Mersin	66 kg

Aleksandar Maksimović (Serbian: Александар Максимовић, born 26 February 1988) is a Serbian Greco-Roman wrestler who has competed in the 66 and 71 kg weight divisions.

== Biography ==
Maksimović has won three bronze medals at the European Wrestling Championships in 2011, 2012, and 2017. At the 2009 Mediterranean Games in Pescara, Maksimović won a silver medal. He represented Serbia at the 2012 Summer Olympics and soon won another silver medal at the 2013 Mediterranean Games in Mersin. Maksimović participated at the 2016 European Wrestling Championships, winning the silver medal after a loss by a one-point difference against Armenia.

On 5 June 2016, Maksimović switched from sports to politics, being elected as a member of Serbian People's Party.
