= 2017 World Wrestling Championships – Men's Greco-Roman 80 kg =

Men's Greco-Roman 80 kg at the 2017 World Championships
- Venue: AccorHotels Arena
- Dates: 22 August 2017
- Competitors: 29 from 29 nations

Medalists
gold medal	Maksim Manukyan	Armenia
silver medal	Radzik Kuliyeu	Belarus
bronze medal	Pascal Eisele	Germany
bronze medal	Elvin Mursaliyev	Azerbaijan

The men's Greco-Roman 80 kilograms is a competition featured at the 2017 World Wrestling Championships, and was held in Paris, France on 22 August 2017.

This freestyle wrestling competition consisted of a single-elimination tournament, with a repechage used to determine the winners of two bronze medals.

== Results ==
Legend

- F — Won by fall

=== Final ===
Final
Maksim Manukyan (ARM)	5
Radzik Kuliyeu (BLR)	0

=== Top half ===
Round of 32
Maksim Manukyan (ARM)	10
Yousef Ghaderian (IRI)	1
Petr Novák (CZE)	3
Alex Kessidis (SWE)	5
Božo Starčević (CRO)	2
Kim June-hyoung (KOR)	1
Bachir Sid Azara (ALG)	2
Zurabi Datunashvili (GEO)	2
Samat Shirdakov (KGZ)	4
Dmytro Pyshkov (UKR)	3
Michael Wagner (AUT)	9
Anis Gharbi (FRA)	0

Round of 16
Aslan Atem (TUR)	2
Pascal Eisele (GER)	6^{F}
Maksim Manukyan (ARM)	8
Alex Kessidis (SWE)	4
Božo Starčević (CRO)	2
Zurabi Datunashvili (GEO)	3
Samat Shirdakov (KGZ)	2
Michael Wagner (AUT)	2

Quarterfinals
Pascal Eisele (GER)	0
Maksim Manukyan (ARM)	3
Zurabi Datunashvili (GEO)	3
Michael Wagner (AUT)	2

Semifinals
Maksim Manukyan (ARM)	7^{F}
Zurabi Datunashvili (GEO)	0

=== Bottom half ===
Round of 32
Mark Madsen (DEN)	9
Daniel Aleksandrov (BUL)	9
Radzik Kuliyeu (BLR)	6
Zhao Guohao (CHN)	1
Harpreet Singh Sandhu (IND)	1
Askhat Dilmukhamedov (KAZ)	3
László Szabó (HUN)	11^{F}
Cheney Haight (USA)	2
Žarko Dickov (SRB)	0
Zied Ayet Ikram (MAR)	8
Yuya Maeta (JPN)	2
Johan Batista (DOM)	4
Roman Vlasov (RUS)	2
Elvin Mursaliyev (AZE)	2

Round of 16
Daniel Aleksandrov (BUL)	1
Radzik Kuliyeu (BLR)	2
Askhat Dilmukhamedov (KAZ)	2
László Szabó (HUN)	1
Zied Ayet Ikram (MAR)	7^{F}
Johan Batista (DOM)	2
Elvin Mursaliyev (AZE)	8
Edgar Babayan (POL)	0

Quarterfinals
Radzik Kuliyeu (BLR)	2
Askhat Dilmukhamedov (KAZ)	1
Zied Ayet Ikram (MAR)	0
Elvin Mursaliyev (AZE)	2

Semifinals
Radzik Kuliyeu (BLR)	3
Elvin Mursaliyev (AZE)	3

=== Repechage ===
Repechage round 1
Yousef Ghaderian (IRI)	3
Alex Kessidis (SWE)	3
Zhao Guohao (CHN)	1
Daniel Aleksandrov (BUL)	2

Repechage round 2
Alex Kessidis (SWE)	1
Pascal Eisele (GER)	8
Daniel Aleksandrov (BUL)	2
Askhat Dilmukhamedov (KAZ)	1

Bronze medals
Pascal Eisele (GER)	5^{F}
Zurabi Datunashvili (GEO)	2
Daniel Aleksandrov (BUL)	1
Elvin Mursaliyev (AZE)	2
