= 2017 Wrestling World Cup – Men's Greco-Roman =

Men's Greco-Roman at the 2017 Wrestling World Cup
- Location: Abadan, Iran
- Dates: 16–17 May

Medalists
| gold medal | Russia |
| silver medal | Azerbaijan |
| bronze medal | Iran |

The 2017 Wrestling World Cup - Men's Greco-Roman was held in Abadan, Iran at the Kowsar Sport Complex On March 16 to March 17, 2017.

Russia won the tournament after a three years absence of titles on the World Cups.

== Pool stage ==
| Team competes for 1st place |
| Team competes for 3rd place |
| Team competes for 5th place |
| Team competes for 7th place |

=== Pool A ===
| Team | Pld | W | L |
|---|---|---|---|
| Russia | 3 | 3 | 0 |
| Iran | 3 | 2 | 1 |
| Germany | 3 | 1 | 2 |
| Kazakhstan | 3 | 0 | 3 |

POOL A
Round I

Kazakhstan 0 - 8 Russia
| Weight | Kazakhstan | result | Russia |
|---|---|---|---|
| 59 kg | Zhanserik Sarsenbaev | 0 – 3 | Stepan Maryanyan |
| 66 kg | Daniar Kalenov | 1 – 2 | Aleksey Kiyankin |
| 71 kg | Demeu Zhadrayev | 2 – 4 | Yury Denisov |
| 75 kg | Maxat Yerezhepov | 1 – 5 | Chingiz Labazanov |
| 80 kg | Daulet Zhaksylykov | 1 – 5 | Adlan Akiev |
| 85 kg | Azamat Kustubayev | 1 – 1 | Evgeny Saleev |
| 98 kg | Alimkhan Syzdykov | 1 – 8 | Maksim Safarian |
| 130 kg | Damir Kuzembayev | 1 – 5 | Boris Vainsteyn |

Germany 1 - 7 Iran
| Weight | Germany | result | Iran |
|---|---|---|---|
| 59 kg | Christoph Kraemer | 0 – 2 | Mohsen Hajipour |
| 66 kg | Erik Weiss | 0 – 2 | Mehdi Zeidvand |
| 71 kg | Maximilian Schwabe | 0 – 7 | Mohammad Ali Geraei |
| 75 kg | Florian Neumaier | 2 – 7 | Saeed Abdevali |
| 80 kg | Pascal Eisele | 2 – 11 | Yousef Ghaderian |
| 85 kg | Ramsin Azizsir | 1 – 2 | Hossein Nouri |
| 98 kg | Oliver Hassler | 0 – 5 | Seyed mostafa Salehizadeh |
| 130 kg | Eduard Popp | 5 – 2 | Amir Ghasemi |

Round II

Iran 3 - 5 Russia
| Weight | Iran | result | Russia |
|---|---|---|---|
| 59 kg | Saman Abdevali | 1 – 3 | Mingiyan Semenov |
| 66 kg | Ali Arsalan | 4 – 7 | Artem Surkov |
| 71 kg | Mohammad Ali Geraei | 4 – 0 | Abuyazid Mantsigov |
| 75 kg | Saeed Abdevali | 1 – 5 | Roman Vlasov |
| 80 kg | Yousef Ghaderian | 3 – 0 | Ramazan Abacharaev |
| 85 kg | Hossein Nouri | 0 – 9 | Davit Chakvetadze |
| 98 kg | Seyed mostafa Salehizadeh | 2 – 0 | Maksim Safarian |
| 130 kg | Behnam Mehdizadeh | 1 – 2 | Sergey Semenov |

Germany 6 - 2 Kazakhstan
| Weight | Germany | result | Kazakhstan |
|---|---|---|---|
| 59 kg | Christoph Kraemer | 4 – 3 | Zhanserik Sarsenbaev |
| 66 kg | Erik Weiss | 0 – 5 | Daniar Kalenov |
| 71 kg | Maximilian Schwabe | 0 – 1 | Demeu Zhadrayev |
| 75 kg | Florian Neumaier | 3 – 0 | Tamerlan Shadukaev |
| 80 kg | Pascal Eisele | 5 – 1 | Daulet Zhaksylykov |
| 85 kg | Ramsin Azizsir | 2 – 1 | Azamat Kustubayev |
| 98 kg | Oliver Hassler | 4 – 2 | Alimkhan Syzdykov |
| 130 kg | Eduard Popp | 6 – 3 | Damir Kuzembayev |

Round III

Germany 1 - 7 Russia
| Weight | Germany | result | Russia |
|---|---|---|---|
| 59 kg | Christoph Kraemer | 1 – 3 | Stepan Maryanyan |
| 66 kg | Erik Weiss | 1 – 5 | Aleksey Kiyankin |
| 71 kg | Maximilian Schwabe | 0 – 4^{F} | Yury Denisov |
| 75 kg | Florian Neumaier | 1 – 6 | Chingiz Labazanov |
| 80 kg | Pascal Eisele | 4 – 10 | Adlan Akiev |
| 85 kg | Ramsin Azizsir | 1 – 2 | Evgeny Saleev |
| 98 kg | Peter Öhler | 1 – 1 | Maksim Safarian |
| 130 kg | Christian John | 0 – 4^{F} | Sergey Semenov |

Iran 6 - 2 Kazakhstan
| Weight | Iran | result | Kazakhstan |
|---|---|---|---|
| 59 kg | Mohsen Hajipour | 2 – 1 | Zhanserik Sarsenbaev |
| 66 kg | Ali Arsalan | 3 – 2 | Daniar Kalenov |
| 71 kg | Afshin Biabangard | 1 – 1 | Demeu Zhadrayev |
| 75 kg | Rasoul Garmsiri | 0 – 3 | Maxat Yerezhepov |
| 80 kg | Ramin Taheri | 3 – 0 | Daulet Zhaksylykov |
| 85 kg | Mahdi Fallah | 1 – 1 | Azamat Kustubayev |
| 98 kg | Mehdi Aliyari | 10 – 1 | Alimkhan Syzdykov |
| 130 kg | Behnam Mehdizadeh | 2 – 0 | Damir Kuzembayev |

=== Pool B ===
| Team | Pld | W | L |
|---|---|---|---|
| Azerbaijan | 3 | 3 | 0 |
| Turkey | 3 | 2 | 1 |
| Ukraine | 3 | 1 | 2 |
| Belarus | 3 | 0 | 3 |

POOL B
Round I

Turkey 3 - 5 Azerbaijan
| Weight | Turkey | result | Azerbaijan |
|---|---|---|---|
| 59 kg | Hammet Rüstem | 6^{F} – 0 | Rovshan Bayramov |
| 66 kg | Atakan Yüksel | 5 – 2 | Kamran Mammadov |
| 71 kg | İlker Sönmez | 1 – 1 | Hasan Aliyev |
| 75 kg | Emrah Kuş | 1 – 3 | Elvin Mursaliyev |
| 80 kg | Aslan Atem | 4 – 2 | Rafig Huseynov |
| 85 kg | Metehan Başar | 0 – 7 | Islam Abbasov |
| 98 kg | Cenk İldem | 1 – 3 | Orkhan Nuriyev |
| 130 kg | Ali Nail Arslan | 0 – 2 | Sabah Shariati |

Ukraine 6 - 2 Belarus
| Weight | Ukraine | result | Belarus |
|---|---|---|---|
| 59 kg | Zhora Abovian | 8 – 4 | Maksim Kazharski |
| 66 kg | Parviz Nasibov | 3 – 2 | Yaraslau Kardash |
| 71 kg | Ruslan Israfilov | 0 – 2 | Pavel Liakh |
| 75 kg | Mykola Daragan | 9^{F} – 1 | Yegor Kasiankov |
| 80 kg | Dmytro Pyshkov | 3 – 0 | Radik Kuliev |
| 85 kg | Yuri Shkriuba | 2 – 1 | Nikolai Stadub |
| 98 kg | Vladimir Vasilev | 7 – 1 | Egor Yaskavets |
| 130 kg | Oleksandr Chernetskyi | 4 – 4 | Georgi Chuhashvili |

Round II

Belarus 3 - 5 Azerbaijan
| Weight | Belarus | result | Azerbaijan |
|---|---|---|---|
| 59 kg | Maksim Kazharski | 2 – 1 | Taleh Mammadov |
| 66 kg | Yaraslau Kardash | 0 – 8 | Nofal Babayev |
| 71 kg | Pavel Liakh | 0 – 9 | Hasan Aliyev |
| 75 kg | Yegor Kasiankov | 2 – 10 | Elvin Mursaliyev |
| 80 kg | Radik Kuliev | 0 – 2 | Rafig Huseynov |
| 85 kg | Nikolai Stadub | 0 – 3 | Islam Abbasov |
| 98 kg | Egor Yaskavets | 8 – 7 | Orkhan Nuriyev |
| 130 kg | Georgi Chuhashvili | W – | Sabah Shariati |

Ukraine 3 - 5 Turkey
| Weight | Ukraine | result | Turkey |
|---|---|---|---|
| 59 kg | Zhora Abovian | 0 – 9 | Hammet Rüstem |
| 66 kg | Parviz Nasibov | 2 – 1 | Atakan Yüksel |
| 71 kg | Ruslan Israfilov | 1 – 2 | İlker Sönmez |
| 75 kg | Mykola Daragan | 1 – 5 | Emrah Kuş |
| 80 kg | Dmytro Pyshkov | 4 – 1 | Aslan Atem |
| 85 kg | Yuri Shkriuba | 1 – 4 | Metehan Başar |
| 98 kg | Vladimir Vasilev | 0 – 8 | Süleyman Demirci |
| 130 kg | Oleksandr Chernetskyi | 8 – 0 | Ali Nail Arslan |

Round III

Ukraine 3 - 5 Azerbaijan
| Weight | Ukraine | result | Azerbaijan |
|---|---|---|---|
| 59 kg | Zhora Abovian | 1 – 9 | Taleh Mammadov |
| 66 kg | Parviz Nasibov | 2 – 2 | Kamran Mammadov |
| 71 kg | Ruslan Israfilov | 0 – 7 | Rasul Chunayev |
| 75 kg | Artem Matiash | 1 – 11 | Elvin Mursaliyev |
| 80 kg | Dmytro Pyshkov | 3 – 1 | Rafig Huseynov |
| 85 kg | Yuri Shkriuba | 1 – 3 | Islam Abbasov |
| 98 kg | Vladimir Vasilev | 1 – 1 | Orkhan Nuriyev |
| 130 kg | Mykola Kuchmii | 2 – 1 | Oyan Nazariani |

Belarus 2 - 6 Turkey
| Weight | Belarus | result | Turkey |
|---|---|---|---|
| 59 kg | Maksim Kazharski | 1 – 2 | Hammet Rüstem |
| 66 kg | Yaraslau Kardash | – W | Enes Başar |
| 71 kg | Pavel Liakh | 1 – 2 | İlker Sönmez |
| 75 kg | Yegor Kasiankov | 1 – 2 | Emrah Kuş |
| 80 kg | Radik Kuliev | 2 – 1 | Aslan Atem |
| 85 kg | Nikolai Stadub | 2 – 1 | Metehan Başar |
| 98 kg | Egor Yaskavets | 0 – 8 | Süleyman Demirci |
| 130 kg | Georgi Chuhashvili | 0 – 2 | Ali Nail Arslan |

== Medal Matches ==
Medal Matches
First-Place Match

Azerbaijan 3 - 5 Russia
| Weight | | result | |
|---|---|---|---|
| 59 kg | Taleh Mammadov | 2 – 9 | Mingiyan Semenov |
| 66 kg | Nofal Babayev | 0 – 10 | Artem Surkov |
| 71 kg | Rasul Chunayev | 2 – 1 | Abuyazid Mantsigov |
| 75 kg | Elvin Mursaliyev | 0 – 2 | Roman Vlasov |
| 80 kg | Rafig Huseynov | 1 – 1 | Adlan Akiev |
| 85 kg | Islam Abbasov | 1 – 2 | Davit Chakvetadze |
| 98 kg | Orkhan Nuriyev | 3 – 0 | Maksim Safarian |
| 130 kg | Sabah Shariati | 1 – 1 | Sergey Semenov |

Third-Place Match

Turkey 2 - 6 Iran
| Weight | | result | |
|---|---|---|---|
| 59 kg | Hammet Rüstem | 0 – 9 | Saman Abdevali |
| 66 kg | Atakan Yuksel | 0 – 4 | Mehdi Zeidvand |
| 71 kg | İlker Sönmez | 0 – 9 | Mohammadali Geraei |
| 75 kg | Emrah Kuş | 2 – 1 | Rasoul Garmsiri |
| 80 kg | Aslan Atem | 1 – 2 | Yousef Ghaderian |
| 85 kg | Metehan Basar | 2 – ^{DQ}1 | Mahdi Fallah |
| 98 kg | Cenk Ildem | 1 – 7 | Mehdi Aliyari |
| 130 kg | Ali Nail Arslan | 1 – 2 | Behnam Mehdizadeh |

Fifth-Place Match

Ukraine 3 - 5 Germany
| Weight | Ukraine | result | Germany |
|---|---|---|---|
| 59 kg | Zhora Abovian | 3 – 2 | Christoph Kraemer |
| 66 kg | Parviz Nasibov | 2 – 1 | Erik Weiss |
| 71 kg | Ruslan Israfilov | 0 – 2^{F} | Maximilian Schwabe |
| 75 kg | Mykola Daragan | 1 – 2 | Florian Neumaier |
| 80 kg | Dmytro Pyshkov | 3 – 7 | Pascal Eisele |
| 85 kg | Yuri Shkriuba | 0 – 2 | Ramsin Azizsir |
| 98 kg | Vladimir Vasilev | 0 – 7 | Peter Öhler |
| 130 kg | Oleksandr Chernetskyi | 8 – 0 | Christian John |

Seventh-Place Match

Belarus 2 - 6 Kazakhstan
| Weight | Belarus | result | Kazakhstan |
|---|---|---|---|
| 59 kg | Maksim Kazharski | 3 – 7 | Zhanserik Sarsenbaev |
| 66 kg | Yaraslau Kardash | 0^{DQ} – 0 | Daniar Kalenov |
| 71 kg | Pavel Liakh | 4 – 2 | Demeu Zhadrayev |
| 75 kg | Yegor Kasiankov | 9 – 1 | Maxat Yerezhepov |
| 80 kg | Radik Kuliev | 1 – 6 | Daulet Zhaksylykov |
| 85 kg | Nikolai Stadub | 1 – 4 | Azamat Kustubayev |
| 98 kg | Egor Yaskavets | 0 – 8 | Alimkhan Syzdykov |
| 130 kg | Georgi Chuhashvili | 0 – 6^{F} | Damir Kuzembayev |

== Final classement ==
| Team | Pld | W | L |
|---|---|---|---|
| Russia | 4 | 4 | 0 |
| Azerbaijan | 4 | 3 | 1 |
| Iran | 4 | 3 | 1 |
| Turkey | 4 | 2 | 2 |
| Germany | 4 | 2 | 2 |
| Ukraine | 4 | 1 | 3 |
| Kazakhstan | 4 | 1 | 3 |
| Belarus | 4 | 0 | 4 |

== See also ==
- 2017 Wrestling World Cup - Men's freestyle
