= 2021 World Wrestling Championships – Men's Greco-Roman 82 kg =

Wrestling competitions

Men's Greco-Roman 82 kg at the 2021 World Championships
- Venue: Nye Jordal Amfi
- Dates: 7–8 October 2021
- Competitors: 27 from 27 nations

Medalists
gold medal	Rafig Huseynov	Azerbaijan
silver medal	Burhan Akbudak	Turkey
bronze medal	Adlan Akiev	RWF
bronze medal	Pejman Poshtam	Iran

The men's Greco-Roman 82 kilograms is a competition featured at the 2021 World Wrestling Championships, and was held in Oslo, Norway on 7 and 8 October.

This Greco-Roman wrestling competition consists of a single-elimination tournament, with a repechage used to determine the winner of two bronze medals. The two finalists face off for gold and silver medals. Each wrestler who loses to one of the two finalists moves into the repechage, culminating in a pair of bronze medal matches featuring the semifinal losers each facing the remaining repechage opponent from their half of the bracket.

== Results ==
Legend

- C — Won by 3 cautions given to the opponent
- F — Won by fall

=== Final ===
Final
Rafig Huseynov (AZE)	2
Burhan Akbudak (TUR)	1

=== Top half ===
Round of 32
Per-Anders Kure (NOR)	3
Božo Starčević (CRO)	4
Aivengo Rikadze (GEO)	3
Hannes Wagner (GER)	4
Alex Kessidis (SWE)	9
Maxat Yerezhepov (KAZ)	3
Dmytro Gardubei (UKR)	2
Branko Kovačević (SRB)	1
Rafig Huseynov (AZE)	9
Ranet Kaljola (EST)	0

Round of 16
Adlan Akiev (RWF)	10
Arminas Lygnugaris (LTU)	1
Božo Starčević (CRO)	0
Hannes Wagner (GER)	3
Alex Kessidis (SWE)	5
Dmytro Gardubei (UKR)	1
Rafig Huseynov (AZE)	11
Kalidin Asykeev (KGZ)	1

Quarterfinals
Adlan Akiev (RWF)	9^{F}
Hannes Wagner (GER)	0
Alex Kessidis (SWE)	6
Rafig Huseynov (AZE)	7

Semifinals
Adlan Akiev (RWF)	1
Rafig Huseynov (AZE)	2

=== Bottom half ===
Round of 32
Edgar Babayan (POL)	5^{F}
Rohan Kalisch (AUS)	0
Harpreet Singh Sandhu (IND)	3
Pejman Poshtam (IRI)	4
Igor Petrishin (ISR)	2
Tarek Abdelslam (BUL)	5
Shin Byeong-cheol (KOR)	1
László Szabó (HUN)	7
Burhan Akbudak (TUR)	12
Gegham Torgomyan (ARM)	0
Petr Novák (CZE)	3
Satoki Mukai (JPN)	5

Round of 16
Radzik Kuliyeu (BLR)	4
Edgar Babayan (POL)	1
Pejman Poshtam (IRI)	7
Tarek Abdelslam (BUL)	2
László Szabó (HUN)	0
Burhan Akbudak (TUR)	11^{F}
Satoki Mukai (JPN)	1
Ben Provisor (USA)	2

Quarterfinals
Radzik Kuliyeu (BLR)	1
Pejman Poshtam (IRI)	3
Burhan Akbudak (TUR)	10^{C}
Ben Provisor (USA)	0

Semifinals
Pejman Poshtam (IRI)	2
Burhan Akbudak (TUR)	5

=== Repechage ===
Repechage round 1
Ranet Kaljola (EST)	4^{F}
Kalidin Asykeev (KGZ)	1
Gegham Torgomyan (ARM)	1
László Szabó (HUN)	3

Repechage round 2
Ranet Kaljola (EST)	1
Alex Kessidis (SWE)	10
László Szabó (HUN)	2
Ben Provisor (USA)	1

Bronze medals
Alex Kessidis (SWE)	0
Adlan Akiev (RWF)	8
László Szabó (HUN)	0
Pejman Poshtam (IRI)	4

== Final standing ==
Rank	Athlete
1st place, gold medalist(s)	Rafig Huseynov (AZE)
2nd place, silver medalist(s)	Burhan Akbudak (TUR)
3rd place, bronze medalist(s)	Adlan Akiev (RWF)
3rd place, bronze medalist(s)	Pejman Poshtam (IRI)
5	Alex Kessidis (SWE)
5	László Szabó (HUN)
7	Edgar Babayan (POL)
8	Ranet Kaljola (EST)
9	Hannes Wagner (GER)
10	Tarek Abdelslam (BUL)
11	Satoki Mukai (JPN)
12	Radzik Kuliyeu (BLR)
13	Dmytro Gardubei (UKR)
14	Ben Provisor (USA)
15	Božo Starčević (CRO)
16	Per-Anders Kure (NOR)
17	Aivengo Rikadze (GEO)
18	Harpreet Singh Sandhu (IND)
19	Petr Novák (CZE)
20	Maxat Yerezhepov (KAZ)
21	Igor Petrishin (ISR)
22	Branko Kovačević (SRB)
23	Shin Byeong-cheol (KOR)
24	Arminas Lygnugaris (LTU)
25	Gegham Torgomyan (ARM)
26	Kalidin Asykeev (KGZ)
27	Rohan Kalisch (AUS)
