= 2018 European Wrestling Championships – Men's Greco-Roman 82 kg =

The Men's Greco-Roman 82 kg is a competition featured at the 2018 European Wrestling Championships, and was held in Kaspiysk, Russia on May 1 and May 2.

== Medalists ==
Gold	Maksim Manukyan; Armenia
Silver	Viktar Sasunouski; Belarus
Bronze	Daniel Aleksandrov; Bulgaria
Bronze	Rafig Huseynov; Azerbaijan

== Results ==
Legend

- F — Won by fall
- R — Retired

=== Final ===
Final
Maksim Manukyan (ARM)	9
Viktar Sasunouski (BLR)	0

=== Top half ===
Round of 32

Round of 16
Maksim Manukyan (ARM)	6^{F}
Božo Starčević (CRO)	0
Daniel Aleksandrov (BUL)	5
Emrah Kuş (TUR)	3
Petr Novák (CZE)	3
Ramazan Abacharaev (RUS)	4
László Szabó (HUN)	5^{F}
Michael Wagner (AUT)	0

Quarterfinals
Maksim Manukyan (ARM)	5
Daniel Aleksandrov (BUL)	2
Ramazan Abacharaev (RUS)	0^{R}
László Szabó (HUN)	7

Semifinals
Maksim Manukyan (ARM)	8
László Szabó (HUN)	0

=== Bottom half ===
Round of 32
Edgar Babayan (POL)	0
Zurabi Datunashvili (GEO)	1

Round of 16
Dmytro Arabadzhy (UKR)	3
Roland Schwarz (GER)	6
Viktar Sasunouski (BLR)	4
Alexander Jersgren (SWE)	2
Viorel Burduja (MDA)	3
Žarko Dickov (SRB)	6
Rafig Huseynov (AZE)	4
Zurabi Datunashvili (GEO)	3

Quarterfinals
Roland Schwarz (GER)	3
Viktar Sasunouski (BLR)	4
Žarko Dickov (SRB)	1
Rafig Huseynov (AZE)	3

Semifinals
Viktar Sasunouski (BLR)	9
Rafig Huseynov (AZE)	0

=== Repechage ===
Repechage round 2
Božo Starčević (CRO)	1
Daniel Aleksandrov (BUL)	1
Alexander Jersgren (SWE)	1
Roland Schwarz (GER)	3

Bronze medals
Daniel Aleksandrov (BUL)	3
László Szabó (HUN)	2
Roland Schwarz (GER)	3
Rafig Huseynov (AZE)	4
