= 2016 European Wrestling Championships – Men's Greco-Roman 80 kg =

The men's Greco-Roman 80 kg is a competition featured at the 2016 European Wrestling Championships, and was held in Riga, Latvia on March 13.

== Medalists ==
Gold	Pascal Eisele; Germany
Silver	Edgar Babayan; Poland
Bronze	Aslan Atem; Turkey
Bronze	Daniel Aleksandrov; Bulgaria

== Results ==
Legend

- F — Won by fall

=== Final ===
Final
Pascal Eisele (GER)	8
Edgar Babayan (POL)	0

=== Top half ===
==== Section 1 ====
Round of 32

Round of 16
Edgar Babayan (POL)	2
Aslan Atem (TUR)	1
Oleksii Chekalenko (UKR)	2
Rafik Manukyan (ARM)	4
Nikoloz Kelasov (GEO)	0
Ramazan Abacharaev (RUS)	5
Bozo Starcevic (CRO)	11
Aleksandrs Višņakovs (LAT)	0

Quarterfinals
Edgar Babayan (POL)	2
Rafik Manukyan (ARM)	2
Ramazan Abacharaev (RUS)	5
Bozo Starcevic (CRO)	1

Semifinals
Edgar Babayan (POL)	4
Ramazan Abacharaev (RUS)	2

=== Bottom half ===
==== Section 1 ====
Round of 32
Nikolaos Varkas (GRE)	0
Rajbek Bisultanov (DEN)	11^{F}
Daniel Aleksandrov (BUL)	6
Julius Matuzevicius (LTU)	0
Jim Eric Pettersson (SWE)	6
Patrik Szabo (HUN)	0
Michael Wagner (AUT)	0
Pavel Paminchuk (BLR)	4^{F}
Rafael Samurgashev (MNE)	0
Rafig Huseynov (AZE)	4^{F}

Round of 16
Pascal Eisele (GER)	8
Jarno Ålander (FIN)	0
Jonas Bossert (SUI)	2
Rajbek Bisultanov (DEN)	7
Daniel Aleksandrov (BUL)	4
Jim Eric Pettersson (SWE)	4
Pavel Paminchuk (BLR)	4
Rafig Huseynov (AZE)	5

Quarterfinals
Pascal Eisele (GER)	4^{F}
Rajbek Bisultanov (DEN)	0
Daniel Aleksandrov (BUL)	8
Rafig Huseynov (AZE)	4

Semifinals
Pascal Eisele (GER)	8
Daniel Aleksandrov (BUL)	0

=== Repechage ===
Repechage round 2
Aslan Atem (TUR)	3
Rafik Manukyan (ARM)	0
Jarno Ålander (FIN)	4
Rajbek Bisultanov (DEN)	5

Bronze medals
Aslan Atem (TUR)	4
Ramazan Abacharaev (RUS)	2
Rajbek Bisultanov (DEN)	0
Daniel Aleksandrov (BUL)	9
