= 2017 European Wrestling Championships – Men's Greco-Roman 80 kg =

The Men's Greco-Roman 80 kg competition at the 2017 European Wrestling Championships was held in Novi Sad, Serbia on May 7, 2017.

== Medalists ==
Gold	Zurabi Datunashvili (GEO)
Silver	Radik Kuliyeu (BLR)
Bronze	Aslan Atem (TUR)
Bronze	Adlan Akiev (RUS)

== Results ==
Legend

- F — Won by fall

=== Final ===
Final
Radzik Kuliyeu (BLR)	2
Zurabi Datunashvili (GEO)	4

=== Top half ===
Round of 32

Round of 16
Bogdan Kourinnoi (SWE)	0
Radik Kuliyeu (BLR)	8
Michale Wagner (AUT)	5
Edgar Babayan (POL)	6
Dmytro Pyshkov (UKR)	2
Sargis Kocharyan (ARM)	1
Aslan Atem (TUR)	8
Emin Ahmadov (AZE)	0

Quarterfinals
Radik Kuliyeu (BLR)	5
Edgar Babayan (POL)	1
Dmytro Pyshkov (UKR)	1
Aslan Atem (TUR)	3

Semifinals
Radik Kuliyeu (BLR)	2
Aslan Atem (TUR)	0

=== Bottom half ===
Round of 32
Božo Starčević (CRO)	1
Péter Bácsi (HUN)	1

Round of 16
Petr Novák (CZE)	3
Pascal Eisele (GER)	1
Zurabi Datunashvili (GEO)	3
Daniel Aleksandrov (BUL)	2
Petar Balo (SRB)	0
Adlan Akiev (RUS)	2
Nikolaos Varkas (GRE)	0
Božo Starčević (CRO)	4

Quarterfinals
Petr Novák (CZE)	0
Zurabi Datunashvili (GEO)	8
Adlan Akiev (RUS)	3
Božo Starčević (CRO)	1

Semifinals
Zurabi Datunashvili (GEO)	2
Adlan Akiev (RUS)	1

=== Repechage ===
Repechage round 2
Bogdan Kourinnoi (SWE)	1
Edgar Babayan (POL)	4
Daniel Aleksandrov (BUL)	5
Petr Novák (CZE)	2

Bronze medals
Edgar Babayan (POL)	5
Aslan Atem (TUR)	6
Daniel Aleksandrov (BUL)	1
Adlan Akiev (RUS)	3
