= 2016 World Wrestling Championships – Men's Greco-Roman 80 kg =

Men's Greco-Roman 80 kg at the 2016 World Championships
- Venue: SYMA Sports and Conference Centre
- Dates: 11 December 2016
- Competitors: 27 from 27 nations

Medalists
gold medal	Ramazan Abacharaev	Russia
silver medal	Aslan Atem	Turkey
bronze medal	Jonibek Otabekov	Uzbekistan
bronze medal	László Szabó	Hungary

The men's Greco-Roman 80 kilograms is a competition featured at the 2016 World Wrestling Championships, and was held in Budapest, Hungary on 11 December.

== Results ==
Legend

- F — Won by fall

=== Final ===
Final
Ramazan Abacharaev (RUS)	3
Aslan Atem (TUR)	1

=== Top half ===
Round of 32
Alex Kessidis (SWE)	11
Yousef Ghaderian (IRI)	2
Ramazan Abacharaev (RUS)	5
Nikoloz Kelasov (GEO)	3
Pavel Powada (CZE)	6
George Mariea (ROU)	11

Round of 16
Harpreet Singh Sandhu (IND)	4
So Sakabe (JPN)	6^{F}
Jonibek Otabekov (UZB)	6
Nenad Žugaj (CRO)	4
Rafig Huseynov (AZE)	11
Alex Kessidis (SWE)	2
Ramazan Abacharaev (RUS)	2
George Mariea (ROU)	0

Quarterfinals
So Sakabe (JPN)	3
Jonibek Otabekov (UZB)	6
Rafig Huseynov (AZE)	1
Ramazan Abacharaev (RUS)	1

Semifinals
Jonibek Otabekov (UZB)	0
Ramazan Abacharaev (RUS)	6

=== Bottom half ===
Round of 32
Petar Balo (SRB)	1
Na Junjie (CHN)	5
Nikolaos Varkas (GRE)	0
László Szabó (HUN)	11
Edgar Babayan (POL)	9
Michael Wagner (AUT)	1
Viktar Sasunouski (BLR)	2
Yaroslav Filchakov (UKR)	1
Patrick Martinez (USA)	0
Askhat Dilmukhamedov (KAZ)	8
Sargis Kocharyan (ARM)	4
Igor Beşleaga (MDA)	1
Pascal Eisele (GER)	2
Atabek Azisbekov (KGZ)	1
Ilian Georgiev (BUL)	1
Aslan Atem (TUR)	2

Round of 16
Na Junjie (CHN)	3
László Szabó (HUN)	5
Edgar Babayan (POL)	3
Viktar Sasunouski (BLR)	1
Askhat Dilmukhamedov (KAZ)	1
Sargis Kocharyan (ARM)	1
Pascal Eisele (GER)	1
Aslan Atem (TUR)	1

Quarterfinals
László Szabó (HUN)	8
Edgar Babayan (POL)	0
Askhat Dilmukhamedov (KAZ)	2
Aslan Atem (TUR)	3

Semifinals
László Szabó (HUN)	5
Aslan Atem (TUR)	5

=== Repechage ===
Repechage round 1
Nikoloz Kelasov (GEO)	2
George Mariea (ROU)	1
Ilian Georgiev (BUL)	1
Pascal Eisele (GER)	2

Repechage round 2
Nikoloz Kelasov (GEO)	2
Rafig Huseynov (AZE)	1
Pascal Eisele (GER)	4
Askhat Dilmukhamedov (KAZ)	12

Bronze medals
Nikoloz Kelasov (GEO)	1
Jonibek Otabekov (UZB)	1
Askhat Dilmukhamedov (KAZ)	1
László Szabó (HUN)	2
