= 2019 European Wrestling Championships – Men's Greco-Roman 82 kg =

The Men's Greco-Roman 82 kg is a competition featured at the 2019 European Wrestling Championships, and was held in Bucharest, Romania on April 13 and April 14.

== Medalists ==
Gold	Rajbek Bisultanov; Denmark
Silver	Lasha Gobadze; Georgia
Bronze	Aleksandr Komarov; Russia
Bronze	Emrah Kuş; Turkey

== Results ==
Legend

- F — Won by fall
- WO — Won by walkover

=== Final ===
Final
Lasha Gobadze (GEO)	3
Rajbek Bisultanov (DEN)	4

=== Top half ===
Round of 32

Round of 16
Vili Ropponen (FIN)	5
Matteo Maffezzoli (ITA)	3
Petr Novák (CZE)	11
Roman Zhernovetski (ISR)	4
Lasha Gobadze (GEO)	5
Mihail Bradu (MDA)	4
Aleksandr Komarov (RUS)	9
Sargis Kocharyan (ARM)	0

Quarterfinals
Vili Ropponen (FIN)	3
Petr Novák (CZE)	1
Lasha Gobadze (GEO)	5
Aleksandr Komarov (RUS)	0

Semifinals
Vili Ropponen (FIN)	0
Lasha Gobadze (GEO)	11

=== Bottom half ===
Round of 32
Viktar Sasunouski (BLR)	9
Dimitrios Papadopoulos (GRE)	0
Bogdan Kourinnoi (SWE)	3
Yaroslav Filchakov (UKR)	2

Round of 16
Filip Šačić (CRO)	5
Emrah Kuş (TUR)	7
Péter Nagy (HUN)	4
Rafig Huseynov (AZE)	2
Hannes Wagner (GER)	4
Rajbek Bisultanov (DEN)	5
Viktar Sasunouski (BLR)	4
Bogdan Kourinnoi (SWE)	3

Quarterfinals
Emrah Kuş (TUR)	2
Péter Nagy (HUN)	1
Rajbek Bisultanov (DEN)	8
Viktar Sasunouski (BLR)	1

Semifinals
Emrah Kuş (TUR)	5
Rajbek Bisultanov (DEN)	5

=== Repechage ===
Repechage round 2
Mihail Bradu (MDA)	1
Aleksandr Komarov (RUS)	5
Hannes Wagner (GER)	3
Viktar Sasunouski (BLR)	0

Bronze medal match
Aleksandr Komarov (RUS)	8
Vili Ropponen (FIN)	0
Hannes Wagner (GER)	1
Emrah Kuş (TUR)	2
