= 2021 European Wrestling Championships – Men's Greco-Roman 82 kg =

Wrestling competition

The Men's Greco-Roman 82 kg is a competition featured at the 2021 European Wrestling Championships, and was held in Warsaw, Poland on April 24 and April 25.

== Medalists ==
Gold	Adlan Akiev; Russia
Silver	Radzik Kuliyeu; Belarus
Bronze	Hannes Wagner; Germany
Bronze	Aivengo Rikadze; Georgia

== Results ==
Legend

- F — Won by fall
- WO — Won by walkover

=== Final ===
Final
Radzik Kuliyeu (BLR)	1
Adlan Akiev (RUS)	11

=== Top half ===
Round of 32

Round of 16
Ranet Kaljola (EST)	3
Radzik Kuliyeu (BLR)	7
Rosian Dermanski (BUL)	1
Hannes Wagner (GER)	5
Branko Kovačević (SRB)	1
Filip Šačić (CRO)	11
Igor Petrishin (ISR)
Rajbek Bisultanov (DEN)	WO

Quarterfinals
Radzik Kuliyeu (BLR)	3
Hannes Wagner (GER)	1
Filip Šačić (CRO)	1
Rajbek Bisultanov (DEN)	3

Semifinals
Radzik Kuliyeu (BLR)	1
Rajbek Bisultanov (DEN)	1

=== Bottom half ===
Round of 32
Adlan Akiev (RUS)	8
Marc Weber (SUI)	0
Mikko Lyttinen (FIN)	0
Karapet Chalyan (ARM)	9
Burhan Akbudak (TUR)	4
Alex Kessidis (SWE)	6
Yaroslav Filchakov (UKR)	9
Edgar Babayan (POL)	0

Round of 16
Mihail Bradu (MDA)	3
Tunjay Vazirzade (AZE)	6
László Szabó (HUN)	2
Aivengo Rikadze (GEO)	3
Adlan Akiev (RUS)	5
Karapet Chalyan (ARM)	3
Alex Kessidis (SWE)	1
Yaroslav Filchakov (UKR)	5

Quarterfinals
Tunjay Vazirzade (AZE)	2
Aivengo Rikadze (GEO)	5
Adlan Akiev (RUS)	9^{F}
Yaroslav Filchakov (UKR)	2

Semifinals
Aivengo Rikadze (GEO)	1
Adlan Akiev (RUS)	6

=== Repechage ===
Repechage round 1
Marc Weber (SUI)	0
Karapet Chalyan (ARM)	8

Repechage round 2
Ranet Kaljola (EST)	3
Hannes Wagner (GER)	3
Karapet Chalyan (ARM)	5
Yaroslav Filchakov (UKR)	4

Bronze medal match
Hannes Wagner (GER)	3
Rajbek Bisultanov (DEN)	1
Karapet Chalyan (ARM)	2
Aivengo Rikadze (GEO)	3

== Final standing ==
Rank	Athlete
1st place, gold medalist(s)	Adlan Akiev (RUS)
2nd place, silver medalist(s)	Radzik Kuliyeu (BLR)
3rd place, bronze medalist(s)	Hannes Wagner (GER)
3rd place, bronze medalist(s)	Aivengo Rikadze (GEO)
5	Rajbek Bisultanov (DEN)
5	Karapet Chalyan (ARM)
7	Yaroslav Filchakov (UKR)
8	Filip Šačić (CRO)
9	Tunjay Vazirzade (AZE)
10	Alex Kessidis (SWE)
11	Ranet Kaljola (EST)
12	Burhan Akbudak (TUR)
13	Mihail Bradu (MDA)
14	László Szabó (HUN)
15	Rosian Dermanski (BUL)
16	Branko Kovačević (SRB)
17	Mikko Lyttinen (FIN)
18	Edgar Babayan (POL)
19	Marc Weber (SUI)
20	Igor Petrishin (ISR)
