= 2019 World Wrestling Championships – Men's Greco-Roman 82 kg =

Men's Greco-Roman 82 kg at the 2019 World Championships
- Venue: Barys Arena
- Dates: 14–15 September 2019
- Competitors: 23 from 23 nations

Medalists
gold medal	Lasha Gobadze	Georgia
silver medal	Rafig Huseynov	Azerbaijan
bronze medal	Qian Haitao	China
bronze medal	Saeid Abdevali	Iran

The men's Greco-Roman 82 kilograms is a competition featured at the 2019 World Wrestling Championships, and was held in Nur-Sultan, Kazakhstan on 14 and 15 September.

This Greco-Roman wrestling competition consists of a single-elimination tournament, with a repechage used to determine the winner of two bronze medals. The two finalists face off for gold and silver medals. Each wrestler who loses to one of the two finalists moves into the repechage, culminating in a pair of bronze medal matches featuring the semifinal losers each facing the remaining repechage opponent from their half of the bracket.

== Results ==
Legend

- F — Won by fall
- R — Retired
- WO — Won by walkover

=== Final ===
Final
Lasha Gobadze (GEO)	5
Rafig Huseynov (AZE)	3

=== Top half ===
Round of 32
Bogdan Kourinnoi (SWE)	0
Zoltán Lévai (HUN)	9

Round of 16
Emrah Kuş (TUR)	2
Qian Haitao (CHN)	6^{F}
Lasha Gobadze (GEO)	7
John Stefanowicz (USA)	0
Nurbek Khashimbekov (UZB)	3
Park Sang-hyeok (KOR)	2
Zoltán Lévai (HUN)	3
Rajbek Bisultanov (DEN)	3

Quarterfinals
Qian Haitao (CHN)	0
Lasha Gobadze (GEO)	9
Nurbek Khashimbekov (UZB)	6^{F}
Rajbek Bisultanov (DEN)	0

Semifinals
Lasha Gobadze (GEO)	3
Nurbek Khashimbekov (UZB)	1

=== Bottom half ===
Round of 32
Harpreet Singh Sandhu (IND)	0
Petr Novák (CZE)	7
Maksim Manukyan (ARM)	4
Kalidin Asykeev (KGZ)	1
Adlan Akiev (RUS)	7
Pascal Eisele (GER)	0
Rafig Huseynov (AZE)	6
Mihail Bradu (MDA)	0
Iurii Shkriuba (UKR)	6
Igor Petrishin (ISR)	5
Maxat Yerezhepov (KAZ)	4
Yuya Okajima (JPN)	0

Round of 16
Saeid Abdevali (IRI)	9
Petr Novák (CZE)	0
Maksim Manukyan (ARM)	3
Adlan Akiev (RUS)	7^{F}
Rafig Huseynov (AZE)	7
Iurii Shkriuba (UKR)	0
Maxat Yerezhepov (KAZ)	2
Viktar Sasunouski (BLR)	1

Quarterfinals
Saeid Abdevali (IRI)	2
Adlan Akiev (RUS)	1
Rafig Huseynov (AZE)	7
Maxat Yerezhepov (KAZ)	1^{R}

Semifinals
Saeid Abdevali (IRI)	5
Rafig Huseynov (AZE)	8

=== Repechage ===
Repechage round 1
Mihail Bradu (MDA)	1
Iurii Shkriuba (UKR)	2

Repechage round 2
John Stefanowicz (USA)	0
Qian Haitao (CHN)	9
Iurii Shkriuba (UKR)	WO
Maxat Yerezhepov (KAZ)

Bronze medals
Qian Haitao (CHN)	4^{F}
Nurbek Khashimbekov (UZB)	4
Iurii Shkriuba (UKR)	0
Saeid Abdevali (IRI)	7
