= 2015 World Wrestling Championships – Men's Greco-Roman 80 kg =

Las Vegas Wrestling Championships

Men's Greco-Roman 80 kg at the 2015 World Championships
- Venue: Orleans Arena
- Dates: 8 September 2015
- Competitors: 28 from 28 nations

Medalists
gold medal	Selçuk Çebi	Turkey
silver medal	Viktar Sasunouski	Belarus
bronze medal	Yousef Ghaderian	Iran
bronze medal	Lasha Gobadze	Georgia

The men's Greco-Roman 80 kilograms is a competition featured at the 2015 World Wrestling Championships, and was held in Las Vegas, United States on 8 September 2015.

This Greco-Roman wrestling competition consisted of a single-elimination tournament, with a repechage used to determine the winners of two bronze medals.

== Results ==
Legend

- F — Won by fall

=== Final ===
Final
Viktar Sasunouski (BLR)	0
Selçuk Çebi (TUR)	2

=== Top half ===
Round of 32
Julius Matuzevičius (LTU)	4
Yuya Maeta (JPN)	3
Patrick Martinez (USA)	2
Viktar Sasunouski (BLR)	4
Aishan Aisha (CHN)	0
Pavel Powada (CZE)	8
Askhat Dilmukhamedov (KAZ)	2
Harpreet Singh Sandhu (IND)	0

Round of 16
Kim Jin-hyeok (KOR)	8
Zied Ayet Ikram (MAR)	0
Schey McMoore (ASA)	0
Yousef Ghaderian (IRI)	11
Julius Matuzevičius (LTU)	0
Viktar Sasunouski (BLR)	5
Pavel Powada (CZE)	0
Askhat Dilmukhamedov (KAZ)	9

Quarterfinals
Kim Jin-hyeok (KOR)	0
Yousef Ghaderian (IRI)	8
Viktar Sasunouski (BLR)	3
Askhat Dilmukhamedov (KAZ)	2

Semifinals
Yousef Ghaderian (IRI)	3
Viktar Sasunouski (BLR)	3

=== Bottom half ===
Round of 32
Ahmed Abdelsadek (EGY)	0
Selçuk Çebi (TUR)	9
Florian Neumaier (GER)	0
Samat Shirdakov (KGZ)	2
Daniel Aleksandrov (BUL)	3
Oleksandr Shyshman (UKR)	6
László Szabó (HUN)	8
Neven Žugaj (CRO)	0
Rafig Huseynov (AZE)	3
Evgeny Saleev (RUS)	9
Michael Wagner (AUT)	5
Eduard Sargsyan (ARM)	6
Besiki Saldadze (UZB)	2
Petar Balo (SRB)	3
Nikolaos Varkas (GRE)	0
Lasha Gobadze (GEO)	11

Round of 16
Selçuk Çebi (TUR)	7
Samat Shirdakov (KGZ)	2
Oleksandr Shyshman (UKR)	5
László Szabó (HUN)	10
Evgeny Saleev (RUS)	7
Eduard Sargsyan (ARM)	2
Petar Balo (SRB)	2
Lasha Gobadze (GEO)	8

Quarterfinals
Selçuk Çebi (TUR)	3
László Szabó (HUN)	2
Evgeny Saleev (RUS)	0
Lasha Gobadze (GEO)	4^{F}

Semifinals
Selçuk Çebi (TUR)	4^{F}
Lasha Gobadze (GEO)	2

=== Repechage ===
Repechage round 1
Patrick Martinez (USA)	5
Julius Matuzevičius (LTU)	0
Ahmed Abdelsadek (EGY)	0
Samat Shirdakov (KGZ)	6

Repechage round 2
Patrick Martinez (USA)	0
Askhat Dilmukhamedov (KAZ)	4
Samat Shirdakov (KGZ)	6
László Szabó (HUN)	1

Bronze medals
Askhat Dilmukhamedov (KAZ)	0
Yousef Ghaderian (IRI)	2
Samat Shirdakov (KGZ)	0
Lasha Gobadze (GEO)	8
