= 2020 Individual Wrestling World Cup – Men's Greco-Roman 82 kg =

The Men's Greco-Roman 82 kg is a competition featured at the 2020 Individual Wrestling World Cup, and was held in Belgrade, Serbia on 13 and 14 December 2020.

== Medalists ==
| Gold | Milad Alirzaev; Russia |
| Silver | Salih Aydın; Turkey |
| Bronze | Radzik Kuliyeu; Belarus |
| Bronze | Roland Schwarz; Germany |

== Results ==
Legend

- F — Won by fall
- WO — Won by walkover

1/16 finals
| | Score | |
|---|---|---|
| Ruben Gharibyan (ARM) | 1–9 | George Mariea (ROU) |
| Salih Aydın (TUR) | 3–0 | Igor Petrishin (ISR) |

1/8 finals
Milad Alirzaev (RUS) | 9
Yaroslav Filchakov (UKR) | 1
Radzik Kuliyeu (BLR) | 2
Tamás Lévai (HUN) | 1
Filip Šačić (CRO) | 0
Mihail Bradu (MDA) | 5
~~Zied Ayet Ikram (MAR)~~
Ranet Kaljola (EST) | WO
Daniel Aleksandrov (BUL) | 5
Kairatbek Tugolbaev (KGZ) | 3
Roland Schwarz (GER) | 10
Alvis Almendra (PAN) | 0
Oldřich Varga (CZE) | 5
Chawki Doulache (ALG) | 1
George Mariea (ROU) | 6
Salih Aydın (TUR) | 9

Quarterfinals
Milad Alirzaev (RUS) | 3
Radzik Kuliyeu (BLR) | 0
Mihail Bradu (MDA) | 2^{F}
Ranet Kaljola (EST) | 2
Daniel Aleksandrov (BUL) | 1
Roland Schwarz (GER) | 6
Oldřich Varga (CZE) | 3
Salih Aydın (TUR) | 8

Semifinals
Milad Alirzaev (RUS) | 7
Mihail Bradu (MDA) | 4
Roland Schwarz (GER) | 1
Salih Aydın (TUR) | 4

Final
Milad Alirzaev (RUS) | 11
Salih Aydın (TUR) | 0

Repechage round 1
Igor Petrishin (ISR) | 2
George Mariea (ROU) | 4^{F}

Repechage round 2
Yaroslav Filchakov (UKR) | 1
Radzik Kuliyeu (BLR) | 1
George Mariea (ROU) | 0
Oldřich Varga (CZE) | 10

Bronze medals
Radzik Kuliyeu (BLR) | 5
Mihail Bradu (MDA) | 1
Oldřich Varga (CZE) | 1
Roland Schwarz (GER) | 9
