= Wrestling at the 2015 European Games – Men's Greco-Roman 75 kg =

Men's Greco-Roman 75 kg at the 2015 European Games
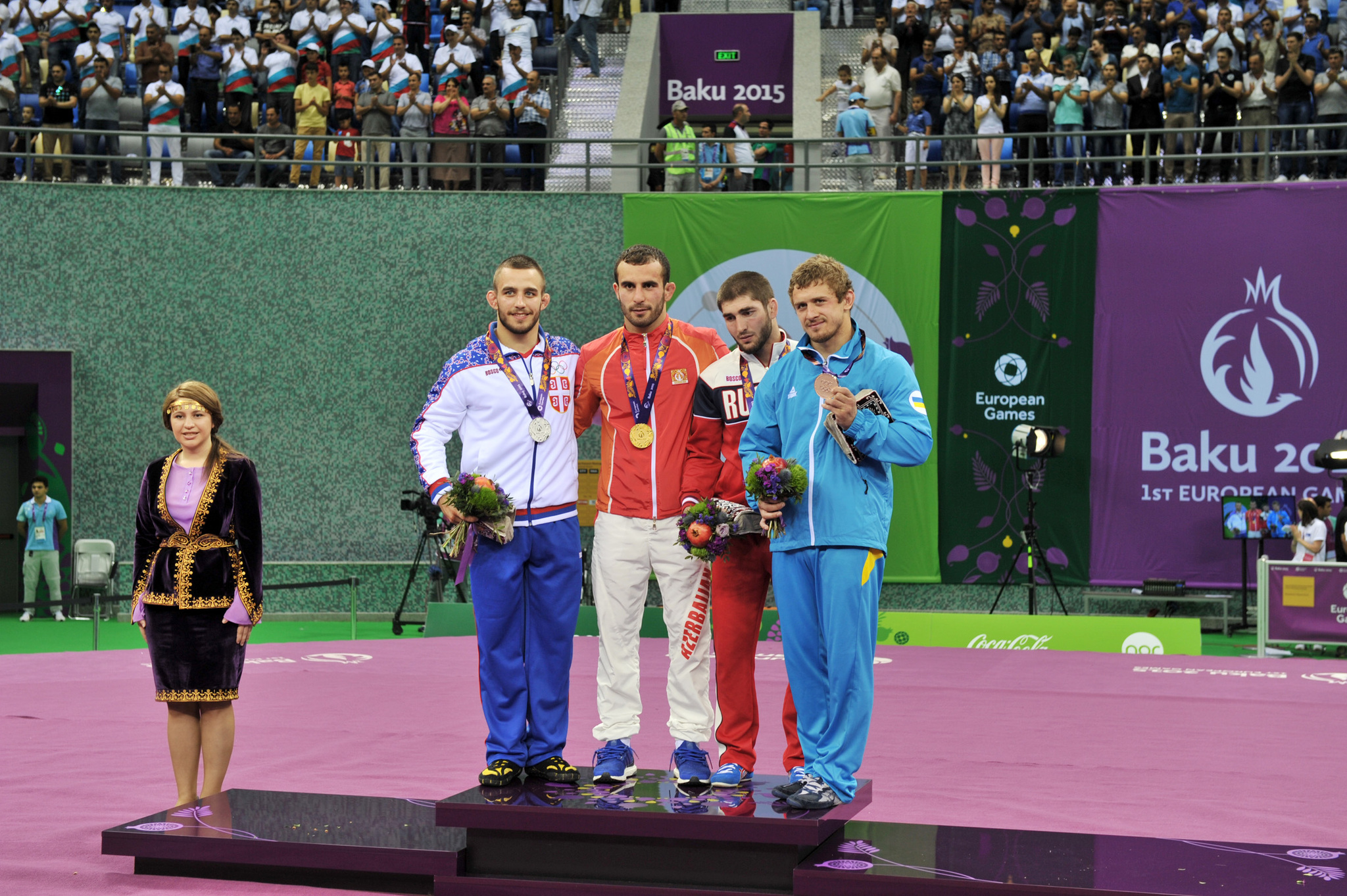
- The medal ceremony.
- Venue: Heydar Aliyev Arena
- Date: 14 June
- Competitors: 29 from 29 nations

Medalists
gold medal	Elvin Mursaliyev	Azerbaijan
silver medal	Viktor Nemeš	Serbia
bronze medal	Chingiz Labazanov	Russia
bronze medal	Dmytro Pyshkov	Ukraine

Men's Greco-Roman 75 kg competition at the 2015 European Games in Baku, Azerbaijan, took place on 14 June at the Heydar Aliyev Arena.

== Schedule ==
All times are Azerbaijan Summer Time (UTC+05:00)

Date	Time	Event
Sunday, 14 June 2015	10:00	Qualifications
Sunday, 14 June 2015	11:00	1/8 finals
Sunday, 14 June 2015	13:00	Quarterfinals
Sunday, 14 June 2015	13:00	Semifinals
Sunday, 14 June 2015	15:00	Repechage
Sunday, 14 June 2015	19:00	Finals

== Results ==
Legend

- F — Won by fall
- WO — Won by walkover

=== Final ===
Final
(Serbia) Viktor Nemeš (SRB)	1
(Azerbaijan) Elvin Mursaliyev (AZE)	5

=== Top half ===
Qualifications
(Serbia) Viktor Nemeš (SRB)	3
(Sweden) Christoffer Nilsson (SWE)	0
(Croatia) Neven Žugaj (CRO)	7
(Austria) Florian Marchl (AUT)	0
(Greece) Petros Manouilidis (GRE)	0
(Ukraine) Dmytro Pyshkov (UKR)	8
(Armenia) Karapet Chalyan (ARM)	0
(Denmark) Mark Madsen (DEN)	8
(Switzerland) Damian Dietsche (SUI)	6^{F}
(Spain) Ricardo Gil (ESP)	3

1/8 finals
(Belarus) Kazbek Kilou (BLR)	0
(Germany) Pascal Eisele (GER)	10
(Italy) Ciro Russo (ITA)	0
(Serbia) Viktor Nemeš (SRB)	8
(Croatia) Neven Žugaj (CRO)	5
(Ukraine) Dmytro Pyshkov (UKR)	6
(Denmark) Mark Madsen (DEN)	10
(Switzerland) Damian Dietsche (SUI)	0

Quarterfinals
(Germany) Pascal Eisele (GER)	1
(Serbia) Viktor Nemeš (SRB)	1
(Ukraine) Dmytro Pyshkov (UKR)	9
(Denmark) Mark Madsen (DEN)	5

Semifinals
(Serbia) Viktor Nemeš (SRB)	5
(Ukraine) Dmytro Pyshkov (UKR)	2

=== Bottom half ===
Qualifications
(Hungary) Martin Szabó (HUN)	0
(Russia) Chingiz Labazanov (RUS)	6
(France) Evrik Nikoghosyan (FRA)	5
(Slovenia) Jure Kuhar (SLO)	0
(Slovakia) Richard Rigó (SVK)	0
(Azerbaijan) Elvin Mursaliyev (AZE)	8
(Poland) Mateusz Wolny (POL)	0
(Romania) Ionel Puşcaşu (ROU)	2
(Czech Republic) Petr Novák (CZE)	1
(Georgia (country)) Zurabi Datunashvili (GEO)	2
(Turkey) Emrah Kuş (TUR)	12
(Latvia) Jevgēņijs Koļcovs (LAT)	2
(Bulgaria) Yavor Yanakiev (BUL)	9
(Finland) Henri Välimäki (FIN)	0
(Moldova) Petru Sevciuc (MDA)	10
(Estonia) Silver Tõgen (EST)	2

1/8 finals
(Russia) Chingiz Labazanov (RUS)	8
(France) Evrik Nikoghosyan (FRA)	0
(Azerbaijan) Elvin Mursaliyev (AZE)	2
(Romania) Ionel Puşcaşu (ROU)	2
(Georgia (country)) Zurabi Datunashvili (GEO)	12
(Turkey) Emrah Kuş (TUR)	10
(Bulgaria) Yavor Yanakiev (BUL)	10
(Moldova) Petru Sevciuc (MDA)	0

Quarterfinals
(Russia) Chingiz Labazanov (RUS)	2
(Azerbaijan) Elvin Mursaliyev (AZE)	4
(Georgia (country)) Zurabi Datunashvili (GEO)	3
(Bulgaria) Yavor Yanakiev (BUL)	1

Semifinals
(Azerbaijan) Elvin Mursaliyev (AZE)	3
(Georgia (country)) Zurabi Datunashvili (GEO)	2

=== Repechage ===
Repechage round 1
(Sweden) Christoffer Nilsson (SWE)	WO
(Italy) Ciro Russo (ITA)
(Slovakia) Richard Rigó (SVK)	2
(Romania) Ionel Puscasu (ROU)	4

Repechage round 2
(Sweden) Christoffer Nilsson (SWE)	2
(Germany) Pascal Eisele (GER)	4
(Romania) Ionel Puşcaşu (ROU)	0
(Russia) Chingiz Labazanov (RUS)	4^{F}

Bronze medal match
(Germany) Pascal Eisele (GER)	2
(Ukraine) Dmytro Pyshkov (UKR)	6
(Russia) Chingiz Labazanov (RUS)	3
(Georgia (country)) Zurabi Datunashvili (GEO)	2
