= 2018 World Wrestling Championships – Men's Greco-Roman 82 kg =

Men's Greco-Roman 82 kg at the 2018 World Championships
- Venue: László Papp Budapest Sports Arena
- Dates: 25–26 October 2018
- Competitors: 26 from 26 nations

Medalists
gold medal	Péter Bácsi	Hungary
silver medal	Emrah Kuş	Turkey
bronze medal	Maksim Manukyan	Armenia
bronze medal	Viktar Sasunouski	Belarus

The men's Greco-Roman 82 kilograms is a competition featured at the 2018 World Wrestling Championships, and was held in Budapest, Hungary on 25 and 26 October.

This Greco-Roman wrestling competition consists of a single-elimination tournament, with a repechage used to determine the winner of two bronze medals. The two finalists face off for gold and silver medals. Each wrestler who loses to one of the two finalists moves into the repechage, culminating in a pair of bronze medal matches featuring the semifinal losers each facing the remaining repechage opponent from their half of the bracket.

== Results ==
Legend

- F — Won by fall
- R — Retired

=== Final ===
Final
Emrah Kuş (TUR)	3
Péter Bácsi (HUN)	4

=== Top half ===
Round of 32
Edgar Babayan (POL)	3
Saeid Abdevali (IRI)	5^{F}
Kim Jin-hyeok (KOR)	4
Andriy Antoniuk (UKR)	2
Maksim Manukyan (ARM)	5
Imil Sharafetdinov (RUS)	1
Luis Avendaño (VEN)	8
Geordan Speiller (USA)	5^{R}

Round of 16
Daniel Aleksandrov (BUL)	3
Rafig Huseynov (AZE)	4
Lasha Gobadze (GEO)	2
Saeid Abdevali (IRI)	6^{F}
Kim Jin-hyeok (KOR)	1
Maksim Manukyan (ARM)	7^{F}
Luis Avendaño (VEN)	0
Emrah Kuş (TUR)	6

Quarterfinals
Rafig Huseynov (AZE)	0
Saeid Abdevali (IRI)	3
Maksim Manukyan (ARM)	1
Emrah Kuş (TUR)	2

Semifinals
Saeid Abdevali (IRI)	4
Emrah Kuş (TUR)	6

=== Bottom half ===
Round of 32
Michael Wagner (AUT)	1
Péter Bácsi (HUN)	2
Maxat Yerezhepov (KAZ)	3
Petr Novák (CZE)	1
Harpreet Singh Sandhu (IND)	5
Zied Ayet Ikram (MAR)	14
Carlos Muñoz (COL)	2
Yuya Maeta (JPN)	3
Roland Schwarz (GER)	12
Viorel Burduja (MDA)	1
Nurbek Khashimbekov (UZB)	1
Na Junjie (CHN)	1

Round of 16
Viktar Sasunouski (BLR)	1
Péter Bácsi (HUN)	2
Maxat Yerezhepov (KAZ)	3
Zied Ayet Ikram (MAR)	1
Yuya Maeta (JPN)	0
Roland Schwarz (GER)	11
Na Junjie (CHN)	6
Atabek Azisbekov (KGZ)	7

Quarterfinals
Péter Bácsi (HUN)	2
Maxat Yerezhepov (KAZ)	1
Roland Schwarz (GER)	2
Atabek Azisbekov (KGZ)	8

Semifinals
Péter Bácsi (HUN)	12
Atabek Azisbekov (KGZ)	4

=== Repechage ===
Repechage round 1
Michael Wagner (AUT)	3
Viktar Sasunouski (BLR)	4^{F}

Repechage round 2
Luis Avendaño (VEN)	2
Maksim Manukyan (ARM)	4
Viktar Sasunouski (BLR)	9
Maxat Yerezhepov (KAZ)	0

Bronze medals
Maksim Manukyan (ARM)	4
Saeid Abdevali (IRI)	1
Viktar Sasunouski (BLR)	5
Atabek Azisbekov (KGZ)	1
