= 2020 European Wrestling Championships – Men's Greco-Roman 82 kg =

Wrestling competition

The men's Greco-Roman 82 kg is a competition featured at the 2020 European Wrestling Championships, and was held in Rome, Italy on February 11 and February 12.

== Medalists ==
| Gold | Rafig Huseynov; Azerbaijan |
| Silver | Daniel Aleksandrov; Bulgaria |
| Bronze | Bogdan Kourinnoi; Sweden |
| Bronze | Hannes Wagner; Germany |

== Results ==
Legend

- F — Won by fall

=== Final ===
| Final |
| Rafig Huseynov (AZE) | 2 |
| Daniel Aleksandrov (BUL) | 1 |

=== Top half ===
Round of 32

Round of 16
Ciro Russo (ITA) | 6
Shamil Ozhaev (RUS) | 4
Ruben Gharibyan (ARM) | 8
Igor Petrishin (ISR) | 0
Rafig Huseynov (AZE) | 8
Tyrone Sterkenburg (NED) | 0
Mihail Bradu (MDA) | 5
Bogdan Kourinnoi (SWE) | 10

Quarterfinals
Ciro Russo (ITA) | 5
Ruben Gharibyan (ARM) | 3
Rafig Huseynov (AZE) | 3
Bogdan Kourinnoi (SWE) | 2

Semifinals
Ciro Russo (ITA) | 1
Rafig Huseynov (AZE) | 7

=== Bottom half ===
Round of 32
Rajbek Bisultanov (DEN) | 0
László Szabó (HUN) | 9
Michael Wagner (AUT) | 3
Daniel Aleksandrov (BUL) | 3
Mateusz Wolny (POL) | 0
Burhan Akbudak (TUR) | 6
Lasha Gobadze (GEO) | 0
Stanislau Shafarenka (BLR) | 4

Round of 16
Andrii Antoniuk (UKR) | 11
Ilias Pagkalidis (GRE) | 0
Hannes Wagner (GER) | 8
Filip Šačić (CRO) | 0
László Szabó (HUN) | 1
Daniel Aleksandrov (BUL) | 5
Burhan Akbudak (TUR) | 5
Stanislau Shafarenka (BLR) | 6

Quarterfinals
Andrii Antoniuk (UKR) | 2
Hannes Wagner (GER) | 3
Daniel Aleksandrov (BUL) | 2
Stanislau Shafarenka (BLR) | 1

Semifinals
Hannes Wagner (GER) | 3
Daniel Aleksandrov (BUL) | 7

=== Repechage ===
Repechage round 1
Michael Wagner (AUT) | 1
László Szabó (HUN) | 4

Repechage round 2
Tyrone Sterkenburg (NED) | 3
Bogdan Kourinnoi (SWE) | 7
László Szabó (HUN) | 1
Stanislau Shafarenka (BLR) | 3

Bronze medal match
Bogdan Kourinnoi (SWE) | 6
Ciro Russo (ITA) | 4
Stanislau Shafarenka (BLR) | 3
Hannes Wagner (GER) | 8

== Final standing ==
| Rank | Athlete |
|---|---|
| 1st place, gold medalist(s) | Rafig Huseynov (AZE) |
| 2nd place, silver medalist(s) | Daniel Aleksandrov (BUL) |
| 3rd place, bronze medalist(s) | Bogdan Kourinnoi (SWE) |
| 3rd place, bronze medalist(s) | Hannes Wagner (GER) |
| 5 | Ciro Russo (ITA) |
| 5 | Stanislau Shafarenka (BLR) |
| 7 | László Szabó (HUN) |
| 8 | Andrii Antoniuk (UKR) |
| 9 | Ruben Gharibyan (ARM) |
| 10 | Burhan Akbudak (TUR) |
| 11 | Michael Wagner (AUT) |
| 12 | Mihail Bradu (MDA) |
| 13 | Shamil Ozhaev (RUS) |
| 14 | Tyrone Sterkenburg (NED) |
| 15 | Lasha Gobadze (GEO) |
| 16 | Mateusz Wolny (POL) |
| 17 | Igor Petrishin (ISR) |
| 18 | Filip Šačić (CRO) |
| 19 | Rajbek Bisultanov (DEN) |
| 20 | Ilias Pagkalidis (GRE) |
