= Qian Haitao =

Chinese Greco-Roman wrestler

Sport
- Country: China
- Sport: Amateur wrestling
- Event: Greco-Roman
Medal record
Men's Greco-Roman wrestling
Representing China
World Championships
Bronze medal – third place	2019 Nur-Sultan	82 kg
Asian Championships
Bronze medal – third place	2019 Xi'an	82 kg

Qian Haitao is a Chinese Greco-Roman wrestler. He won a bronze medal at the 82 kg event at the 2019 World Wrestling Championships held in Nur-Sultan, Kazakhstan.

In 2019, he won a bronze medal in the 82 kg event at the Asian Wrestling Championships held in Xi'an, China.

He competed in the 87 kg event at the 2022 World Wrestling Championships held in Belgrade, Serbia.

He competed at the 2024 Asian Wrestling Olympic Qualification Tournament in Bishkek, Kyrgyzstan and he earned a quota place for China for the 2024 Summer Olympics in Paris, France. He competed in the 87 kg event at the Olympics.

== Achievements ==
Year	Tournament	Location	Result	Event
2019	World Championships	Nur-Sultan, Kazakhstan	3rd	Greco-Roman 82 kg
