= Salih Aydın =

Turkish freestyle wrestler

Personal information
- Full name: Salih Ahmet Aydın
- Born: 25 October 1997 (age 28) Rize, Turkey

Sport
- Country: Turkey
- Sport: Amateur wrestling
- Event: Greco-Roman
- Club: Caykur Sport Club
Medal record
Men's Greco-Roman wrestling
Representing Turkey
Individual World Cup
Silver medal – second place	2020 Belgrade	82 kg
Vehbi Emre & Hamit Kaplan Tournament
Bronze medal – third place	2021 Istanbul	82 kg

Salih Aydın (born 25 October 1997) is a Turkish Greco-Roman wrestler. He is a silver medalist at the 2020 Individual Wrestling World Cup.

== Career ==
Salih Ahmet Aydın clinches silver medal in men's Greco-Roman 82 kg at 2020 Individual World Cup.
