= 2013 European Wrestling Championships – Men's Greco-Roman 74 kg =

The men's Greco-Roman 74 kg is a competition featured at the 2013 European Wrestling Championships, and was held at the Tbilisi Sports Palace in Tbilisi, Georgia on 24 March 2013.

== Medalists ==
Gold	Roman Vlasov; Russia
Silver	Zurabi Datunashvili; Georgia
Bronze	Božo Starčević; Croatia
Bronze	Yavor Yanakiev; Bulgaria

== Results ==
Legend

- F — Won by fall

=== Final ===
Final
Zurabi Datunashvili (GEO)	0	0
Roman Vlasov (RUS)	1	2

=== Top Half ===
Round of 32
Jonas Bossert (SUI)	4	0	2
Yuri Vechshev (ISR)	2	2	1
Rafig Huseynov (AZE)	0	2
Pascal Eisele (GER)	1	3
Şeref Tüfenk (TUR)	6	2
Vojtech Jakus (SVK)	0	0
Alexander Jersgren (SWE)	1	0
Rafik Manukyan (ARM)	4	2

Round of 16
Bálint Korpási (HUN)	0	1
Zurabi Datunashvili (GEO)	2	3
Božo Starčević (CRO)	1	1
Viktor Nemeš (SRB)	0	0
Jonas Bossert (SUI)	0	1
Pascal Eisele (GER)	2	3
Şeref Tüfenk (TUR)	0	2	1
Rafik Manukyan (ARM)	1	1	0

Quarterfinals
Zurabi Datunashvili (GEO)	2	1
Božo Starčević (CRO)	0	0
Pascal Eisele (GER)	4	1	2
Şeref Tüfenk (TUR)	5	0	0

Semifinals
Zurabi Datunashvili (GEO)	2	7
Pascal Eisele (GER)	0	2

=== Bottom Half ===
Round of 32
Ciro Russo (ITA)	0	3	0
Steeve Guénot (FRA)	3	1	7
Yavor Yanakiev (BUL)	2	1
Petr Novák (CZE)	0	0
Roman Vlasov (RUS)	6	6
Artūras Sekus (LTU)	0	0
Valtteri Moisio (FIN)	0	0
Piotr Przepiórka (POL)	1	1
Florian Marchl (AUT)	0	0
Tudor Gaivan (MDA)	4	2
Aliaksandr Dzemyanovich (BLR)	6^{F}
Konstantinos Papadopoulos (GRE)	0
Glebs Silovs (LAT)	0	0
Mykola Daragan (UKR)	1	1
Ionel Puşcaşu (ROU)	1	2	0
Mark Madsen (DEN)	1	0	2

Round of 16
Steeve Guénot (FRA)	1	0	0
Yavor Yanakiev (BUL)	0	1	1
Roman Vlasov (RUS)	3	1
Piotr Przepiórka (POL)	0	1
Tudor Gaivan (MDA)	1	2
Aliaksandr Dzemyanovich (BLR)	3	4
Mykola Daragan (UKR)	0	1	1
Mark Madsen (DEN)	1	0	0

Quarterfinals
Yavor Yanakiev (BUL)	1	0	0
Roman Vlasov (RUS)	0	5	2
Aliaksandr Dzemyanovich (BLR)	2	0	4
Mykola Daragan (UKR)	0	2	0

Semifinals
Roman Vlasov (RUS)	4	5^{F}
Aliaksandr Dzemyanovich (BLR)	0	0

=== Repechage ===
Repechage round 1
Artūras Sekus (LTU)	0	0
Piotr Przepiórka (POL)	1	1

Repechage round 2
Bálint Korpási (HUN)	0	0
Božo Starčević (CRO)	1	1
Piotr Przepiórka (POL)	0	0
Yavor Yanakiev (BUL)	1	1

Bronze medals
Božo Starčević (CRO)	3	1
Pascal Eisele (GER)	0	1
Yavor Yanakiev (BUL)	1	1	3
Aliaksandr Dzemyanovich (BLR)	0	2	0
