= 2021 U23 World Wrestling Championships – Men's Greco-Roman 82 kg =

Greco-Roman event at World Wrestling Championship

The men's Greco-Roman 82 kilograms is a competition featured at the 2021 U23 World Wrestling Championships, and was held in Belgrade, Serbia on 2 and 3 November.

== Medalists ==
Gold	Aivengo Rikadze (GEO)
Silver	Ramon Betschart (SUI)
Bronze	Branko Kovačević (SRB)
Bronze	Shamil Ozhaev (RUS)

== Results ==
Legend

- F — Won by fall

=== Final ===
Final
Ramon Betschart (SUI)	1
Aivengo Rikadze (GEO)	5

=== Top half ===
Round of 32

Round of 16
Mukhammadkodir Rasulov (UZB)	8
Thomas Brackett (USA)	3
Móric Kismóni (HUN)	5
Ilya Bitseyeu (BLR)	3
Branko Kovačević (SRB)	5
Beksultan Nazarbaev (KGZ)	3
Ramon Betschart (SUI)	9
José Mosquera (COL)	0

Quarterfinals
Mukhammadkodir Rasulov (UZB)	1
Móric Kismóni (HUN)	3
Branko Kovačević (SRB)	2
Ramon Betschart (SUI)	2

Semifinals
Móric Kismóni (HUN)	1
Ramon Betschart (SUI)	6

=== Bottom half ===
Round of 32
Arminas Lygnugaris (LTU)	0
Dmytro Gardubei (UKR)	4
Rohit Dahiya (IND)	0
Mohammad Naghousi (IRI)	5
Exauce Mukubu (NOR)	5
Karlo Kodrić (CRO)	3
Ranet Kaljola (EST)	0
Aivengo Rikadze (GEO)	3
Samet Yaldıran (TUR)	1
Otto Ketonen (FIN)	1
Lukas Ahlgren (SWE)	12
Daulet Zhalgassov (KAZ)	1
Shamil Ozhaev (RUS)	9
Ilias Pagkalidis (GRE)	0

Round of 16
Gagik Hakobyan (ARM)	1
Dmytro Gardubei (UKR)	5
Mohammad Naghousi (IRI)	7
Exauce Mukubu (NOR)	5
Aivengo Rikadze (GEO)	9
Otto Ketonen (FIN)	0
Lukas Ahlgren (SWE)	0
Shamil Ozhaev (RUS)	6

Quarterfinals
Dmytro Gardubei (UKR)	1
Mohammad Naghousi (IRI)	4
Aivengo Rikadze (GEO)	5
Shamil Ozhaev (RUS)	3

Semifinals
Mohammad Naghousi (IRI)	3
Aivengo Rikadze (GEO)	5

=== Repechage ===
Repechage round 1
Ranet Kaljola (EST)	7
Otto Ketonen (FIN)	2

Repechage round 2
José Mosquera (COL)	0
Branko Kovačević (SRB)	9
Ranet Kaljola (EST)	1
Shamil Ozhaev (RUS)	2

Bronze medals
Branko Kovačević (SRB)	9
Móric Kismóni (HUN)	1
Shamil Ozhaev (RUS)	8
Mohammad Naghousi (IRI)	0
