= 2021 European Wrestling Championships =

Wrestling competition held in Warsaw, Poland

2021 European Championships
- Host city: Warsaw, Poland
- Dates: 19–25 April
- Stadium: Arena COS Torwar

Champions
- Freestyle: Russia
- Greco-Roman: Russia
- Women: Russia

The 2021 European Wrestling Championships was held from 19 to 25 April 2021 in Warsaw, Poland. 428 athletes from 36 countries competed for continental gold at the European Championship. There were 168 Greco-Roman tournament entries, 155 freestyle competitors and 105 women's wrestlers.

== Medal table ==
* Host nation (Poland)

Rank	Nation	Gold	Silver	Bronze	Total
1	Russia	13	5	4	22
2	Turkey	3	4	1	8
3	Ukraine	2	2	9	13
4	Serbia	2	0	0	2
4	Slovakia	2	0	0	2
6	Bulgaria	1	3	1	5
7	Georgia	1	2	6	9
8	Azerbaijan	1	2	5	8
9	Belarus	1	2	4	7
10	Hungary	1	2	1	4
11	France	1	1	1	3
12	Moldova	1	0	3	4
13	Estonia	1	0	0	1
14	Poland*	0	4	5	9
15	Armenia	0	1	3	4
16	Greece	0	1	0	1
16	Switzerland	0	1	0	1
18	Germany	0	0	4	4
18	Romania	0	0	4	4
20	Italy	0	0	3	3
21	Latvia	0	0	2	2
22	Croatia	0	0	1	1
22	Czech Republic	0	0	1	1
22	Israel	0	0	1	1
22	San Marino	0	0	1	1
Totals (25 entries)		30	30	60	120

== Team ranking ==
Rank	Men's freestyle		Men's Greco-Roman		Women's freestyle	
Rank	Team	Points	Team	Points	Team	Points
1	Russia	206	Russia	175	Russia	168
2	Ukraine	113	Turkey	106	Ukraine	145
3	Georgia	96	Georgia	101	Poland	111
4	Azerbaijan	95	Ukraine	85	Bulgaria	88
5	Turkey	90	Belarus	83	Moldova	77
6	Poland	82	Armenia	78	Belarus	72
7	Belarus	80	Azerbaijan	72	Turkey	67
8	Bulgaria	62	Hungary	68	Azerbaijan	63
9	Slovakia	60	Germany	68	Romania	61
10	Moldova	59	Serbia	58	Germany	56

== Medal summary ==
=== Men's freestyle ===
Event	Gold	Silver	Bronze
57 kg	Süleyman Atlı; Turkey	Nachyn Mongush; Russia	Kamil Kerymov; Ukraine
57 kg	Süleyman Atlı; Turkey	Nachyn Mongush; Russia	Afgan Khashalov; Azerbaijan
61 kg	Abasgadzhi Magomedov; Russia	Andrii Dzhelep; Ukraine	Beka Lomtadze; Georgia
61 kg	Abasgadzhi Magomedov; Russia	Andrii Dzhelep; Ukraine	Eduard Grigorev; Poland
65 kg	Zagir Shakhiev; Russia	Krzysztof Bieńkowski; Poland	Ali Rahimzade; Azerbaijan
65 kg	Zagir Shakhiev; Russia	Krzysztof Bieńkowski; Poland	Maxim Saculțan; Moldova
70 kg	Israil Kasumov; Russia	Turan Bayramov; Azerbaijan	Ihor Nykyforuk; Ukraine
70 kg	Israil Kasumov; Russia	Turan Bayramov; Azerbaijan	Arman Andreasyan; Armenia
74 kg	Tajmuraz Salkazanov; Slovakia	Miroslav Kirov; Bulgaria	Frank Chamizo; Italy
74 kg	Tajmuraz Salkazanov; Slovakia	Miroslav Kirov; Bulgaria	Mitch Finesilver; Israel
79 kg	Achsarbek Gulajev; Slovakia	Saifedine Alekma; France	Nika Kentchadze; Georgia
79 kg	Achsarbek Gulajev; Slovakia	Saifedine Alekma; France	Alans Amirovs; Latvia
86 kg	Artur Naifonov; Russia	Sandro Aminashvili; Georgia	Myles Amine; San Marino
86 kg	Artur Naifonov; Russia	Sandro Aminashvili; Georgia	Ali Shabanau; Belarus
92 kg	Magomed Kurbanov; Russia	Samuel Scherrer; Switzerland	Osman Nurmagomedov; Azerbaijan
92 kg	Magomed Kurbanov; Russia	Samuel Scherrer; Switzerland	Gadzhi Radzhabov; Belarus
97 kg	Alikhan Zhabrailov; Russia	Süleyman Karadeniz; Turkey	Radosław Baran; Poland
97 kg	Alikhan Zhabrailov; Russia	Süleyman Karadeniz; Turkey	Elizbar Odikadze; Georgia
125 kg	Taha Akgül; Turkey	Sergey Kozyrev; Russia	Geno Petriashvili; Georgia
125 kg	Taha Akgül; Turkey	Sergey Kozyrev; Russia	Oleksandr Khotsianivskyi; Ukraine

=== Men's Greco-Roman ===
Event	Gold	Silver	Bronze
55 kg	Emin Sefershaev; Russia	Ekrem Öztürk; Turkey	Rudik Mkrtchyan; Armenia
55 kg	Emin Sefershaev; Russia	Ekrem Öztürk; Turkey	Eldaniz Azizli; Azerbaijan
60 kg	Sergey Emelin; Russia	Kerem Kamal; Turkey	Viktor Petryk; Ukraine
60 kg	Sergey Emelin; Russia	Kerem Kamal; Turkey	Răzvan Arnăut; Romania
63 kg	Zhambolat Lokyaev; Russia	Taleh Mammadov; Azerbaijan	Aleksandrs Jurkjans; Latvia
63 kg	Zhambolat Lokyaev; Russia	Taleh Mammadov; Azerbaijan	Leri Abuladze; Georgia
67 kg	Mate Nemeš; Serbia	Mateusz Bernatek; Poland	Slavik Galstyan; Armenia
67 kg	Mate Nemeš; Serbia	Mateusz Bernatek; Poland	Murat Fırat; Turkey
72 kg	Shmagi Bolkvadze; Georgia	Malkhas Amoyan; Armenia	Maksym Yevtushenko; Ukraine
72 kg	Shmagi Bolkvadze; Georgia	Malkhas Amoyan; Armenia	Róbert Fritsch; Hungary
77 kg	Tamás Lőrincz; Hungary	Yunus Emre Başar; Turkey	Sanan Suleymanov; Azerbaijan
77 kg	Tamás Lőrincz; Hungary	Yunus Emre Başar; Turkey	Antonio Kamenjašević; Croatia
82 kg	Adlan Akiev; Russia	Radzik Kuliyeu; Belarus	Hannes Wagner; Germany
82 kg	Adlan Akiev; Russia	Radzik Kuliyeu; Belarus	Aivengo Rikadze; Georgia
87 kg	Zurab Datunashvili; Serbia	Kiryl Maskevich; Belarus	Zhan Beleniuk; Ukraine
87 kg	Zurab Datunashvili; Serbia	Kiryl Maskevich; Belarus	Milad Alirzaev; Russia
97 kg	Musa Evloev; Russia	Balázs Kiss; Hungary	Mikalai Stadub; Belarus
97 kg	Musa Evloev; Russia	Balázs Kiss; Hungary	Nikoloz Kakhelashvili; Italy
130 kg	Rıza Kayaalp; Turkey	Iakob Kajaia; Georgia	Zurabi Gedekhauri; Russia
130 kg	Rıza Kayaalp; Turkey	Iakob Kajaia; Georgia	Eduard Popp; Germany

=== Women's freestyle ===
Event	Gold	Silver	Bronze
50 kg	Mariya Stadnik; Azerbaijan	Miglena Selishka; Bulgaria	Anna Łukasiak; Poland
50 kg	Mariya Stadnik; Azerbaijan	Miglena Selishka; Bulgaria	Ekaterina Poleshchuk; Russia
53 kg	Olga Khoroshavtseva; Russia	Maria Prevolaraki; Greece	Annika Wendle; Germany
53 kg	Olga Khoroshavtseva; Russia	Maria Prevolaraki; Greece	Iulia Leorda; Moldova
55 kg	Stalvira Orshush; Russia	Roksana Zasina; Poland	Andreea Ana; Romania
55 kg	Stalvira Orshush; Russia	Roksana Zasina; Poland	Khrystyna-Zoryana Demko; Ukraine
57 kg	Iryna Kurachkina; Belarus	Anhelina Lysak; Poland	Alina Hrushyna; Ukraine
57 kg	Iryna Kurachkina; Belarus	Anhelina Lysak; Poland	Evelina Nikolova; Bulgaria
59 kg	Bilyana Dudova; Bulgaria	Veronika Chumikova; Russia	Kateryna Zhydachevska; Romania
59 kg	Bilyana Dudova; Bulgaria	Veronika Chumikova; Russia	Anastasia Nichita; Moldova
62 kg	Iryna Koliadenko; Ukraine	Marianna Sastin; Hungary	Veranika Ivanova; Belarus
62 kg	Iryna Koliadenko; Ukraine	Marianna Sastin; Hungary	Katarzyna Mądrowska; Poland
65 kg	Irina Rîngaci; Moldova	Tetiana Rizhko; Ukraine	Aleksandra Wólczyńska; Poland
65 kg	Irina Rîngaci; Moldova	Tetiana Rizhko; Ukraine	Kriszta Incze; Romania
68 kg	Koumba Larroque; France	Khanum Velieva; Russia	Adéla Hanzlíčková; Czech Republic
68 kg	Koumba Larroque; France	Khanum Velieva; Russia	Alina Berezhna; Ukraine
72 kg	Alla Belinska; Ukraine	Yuliana Yaneva; Bulgaria	Evgenia Zakharchenko; Russia
72 kg	Alla Belinska; Ukraine	Yuliana Yaneva; Bulgaria	Dalma Caneva; Italy
76 kg	Epp Mäe; Estonia	Natalia Vorobieva; Russia	Cynthia Vescan; France
76 kg	Epp Mäe; Estonia	Natalia Vorobieva; Russia	Aline Rotter-Focken; Germany

== Participating nations ==
428 competitors from 36 nations participated.

- Albania (2)
- Armenia (11)
- Austria (7)
- Azerbaijan (22)
- Belarus (28)
- Bulgaria (25)
- Croatia (5)
- Czech Republic (5)
- Denmark (3)
- Estonia (6)
- Finland (7)
- France (12)
- United Kingdom (3)
- Georgia (20)
- Germany (20)
- Greece (5)
- Hungary (17)
- Israel (6)
- Italy (14)
- Kosovo (1)
- Latvia (4)
- Lithuania (11)
- Moldova (21)
- North Macedonia (4)
- Netherlands (1)
- Norway (5)
- Poland (28)
- Romania (15)
- Russia (30)
- San Marino (2)
- Serbia (10)
- Switzerland (6)
- Slovakia (6)
- Sweden (6)
- Turkey (30)
- Ukraine (30)
