= Aivengo Rikadze =

Georgian Greco-Roman wrestler

Sport
- Country: Georgia
- Sport: Amateur wrestling
- Event: Greco-Roman
Medal record
Men's Greco-Roman wrestling
Representing Georgia
European Championships
Bronze medal – third place	2021 Warsaw	82 kg
Bolat Turlykhanov Cup
Silver medal – second place	2022 Almaty	87 kg
World U23 Championships
Gold medal – first place	2021 Belgrade	82 kg
Bronze medal – third place	2019 Budapest	82 kg
European U23 Championships
Bronze medal – third place	2021 Skopje	82 kg

Aivengo Rikadze is a Georgian Greco-Roman wrestler. He won the gold medal in the 82 kg event at the 2021 U23 World Wrestling Championships held in Belgrade, Serbia. He also won one of the bronze medals in the 82 kg event at the 2021 European Wrestling Championships held in Warsaw, Poland.

In 2019, he won one of the bronze medals in the 82 kg event at the World U23 Wrestling Championship held in Budapest, Hungary.
