= Rajbek Bisultanov =

Danish Greco-Roman wrestler

Rajbek Bisultanov Райбек Бисултанов
Personal information
- National team: Denmark
- Citizenship: Russian; Danish
- Born: 29 May 1995 (age 31) Urus-Martan, Chechnya, Russia
- Height: 172 cm (5 ft 8 in)
- Weight: 82 kg (181 lb)

Sport
- Country: Russia; Denmark
- Sport: Amateur wrestling
- Event: Greco-Roman
Medal record
Men's Greco-Roman wrestling
Representing Denmark
European Championships
| Gold medal – first place | 2019 Bucharest | 82 kg |
World U23 Championships
| Silver medal – second place | 2018 Bucharest | 77 kg |
European U23 Championship
| Gold medal – first place | 2018 Istanbul | 77 kg |

Rajbek Alvievich Bisultanov (Russian: Райбек Альвиевич Бисултанов; born 29 May 1995) is a Danish Greco-Roman wrestler. He won the gold medal in the 82 kg event at the 2019 European Wrestling Championships held in Bucharest, Romania.

== Wrestling career ==
In 2018, he won the gold medal in the men's 77 kg event at the European U23 Wrestling Championship held in Istanbul, Turkey.

In 2019, he competed in the 82 kg event at the World Wrestling Championships held in Nur-Sultan, Kazakhstan. He won his first match against Zoltán Lévai of Hungary and he was eliminated from the competition in his next match against Nurbek Khashimbekov of Uzbekistan. In 2021, he lost his bronze medal match in the 82 kg event at the European Wrestling Championships in Warsaw, Poland.

== Mixed martial arts career ==
Bisultanov made his professional mixed martial arts debut at the inaugural Dominance FC event on 21 September 2024.

== Personal life ==
Bisultanov is the older brother of Turpal Bisultanov.

== Achievements ==
| Year | Tournament | Location | Result | Event |
|---|---|---|---|---|
| 2019 | European Championships | Bucharest, Romania | 1st | Greco-Roman 82 kg |
