= Hannes Wagner =

German Greco-Roman wrestler

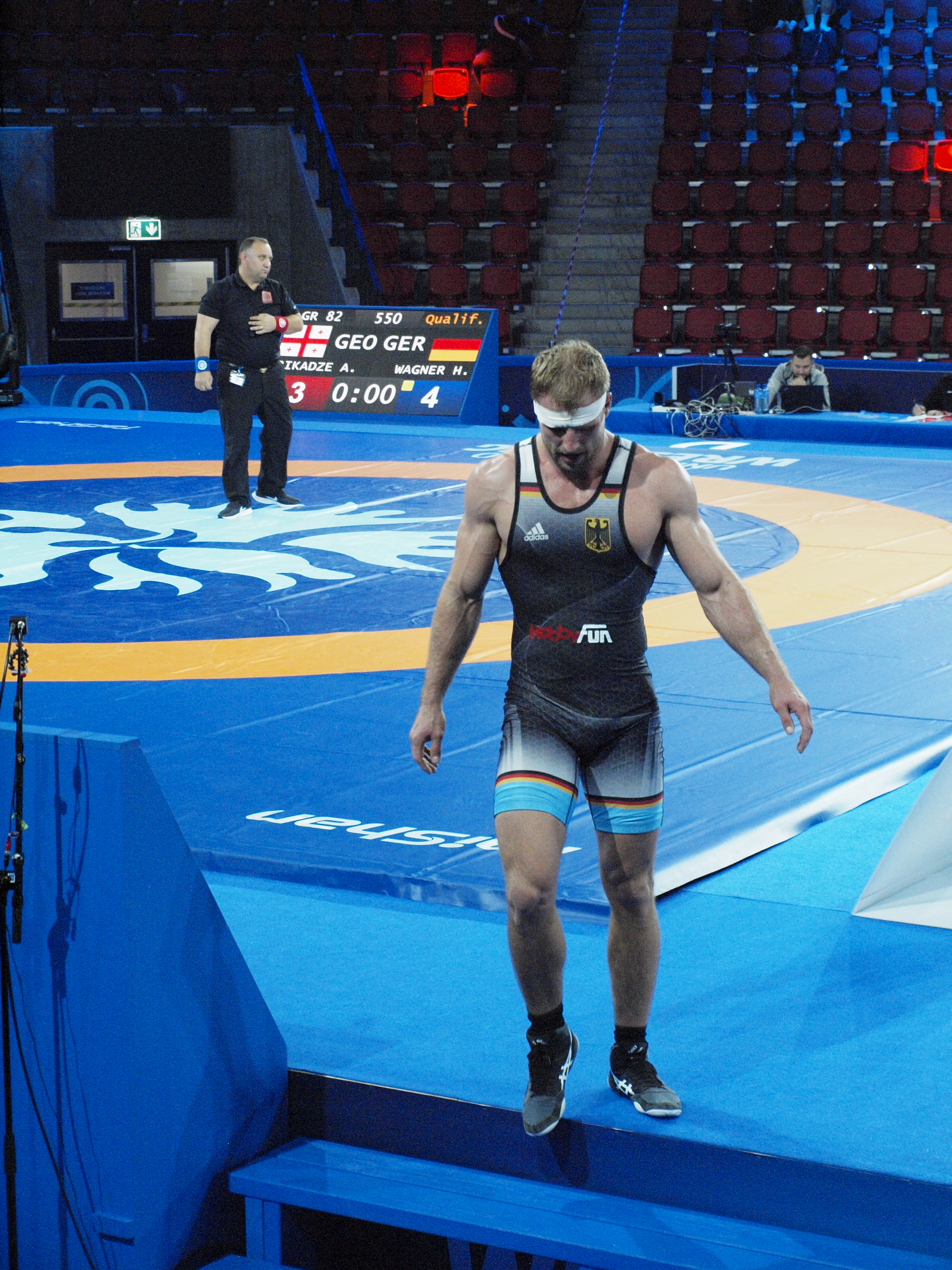
- 2021 World Wrestling Championships in Oslo, Norway – Day 6

Sport
- Country: Germany
- Sport: Amateur wrestling
- Weight class: 82 kg
- Event: Greco-Roman
Medal record
Men's Greco-Roman wrestling
Representing Germany
European Championships
Bronze medal – third place	2020 Rome	82 kg
Bronze medal – third place	2021 Warsaw	82 kg

Hannes Wagner is a German Greco-Roman wrestler. He is a two-time bronze medalist at the European Wrestling Championships.

== Career ==
Wagner lost his bronze medal match in the 82 kg event at the 2019 European Wrestling Championships held in Bucharest, Romania. In 2020, Wagner won one of the bronze medals in the 82 kg event at the European Wrestling Championships held in Rome, Italy.

In January 2021, Wagner won the silver medal in the 82 kg event at the 2021 Grand Prix Zagreb Open held in Zagreb, Croatia. In April 2021, he also won one of the bronze medals in the 82 kg event at the European Wrestling Championships held in Warsaw, Poland.

Wagner competed in the 87 kg event at the 2022 World Wrestling Championships held in Belgrade, Serbia. He competed at the 2024 European Wrestling Olympic Qualification Tournament in Baku, Azerbaijan hoping to qualify for the 2024 Summer Olympics in Paris, France. He was eliminated in his second match and he did not qualify for the Olympics. Wagner also competed at the 2024 World Wrestling Olympic Qualification Tournament held in Istanbul, Turkey without qualifying for the Olympics. He was eliminated in his first match by Jalgasbay Berdimuratov of Uzbekistan.

== Achievements ==
Year	Tournament	Location	Result	Event
2020	European Championships	Rome, Italy	3rd	Greco-Roman 82 kg
2021	European Championships	Warsaw, Poland	3rd	Greco-Roman 82 kg
