= Bogdan Kourinnoi =

Swedish Greco-Roman wrestler

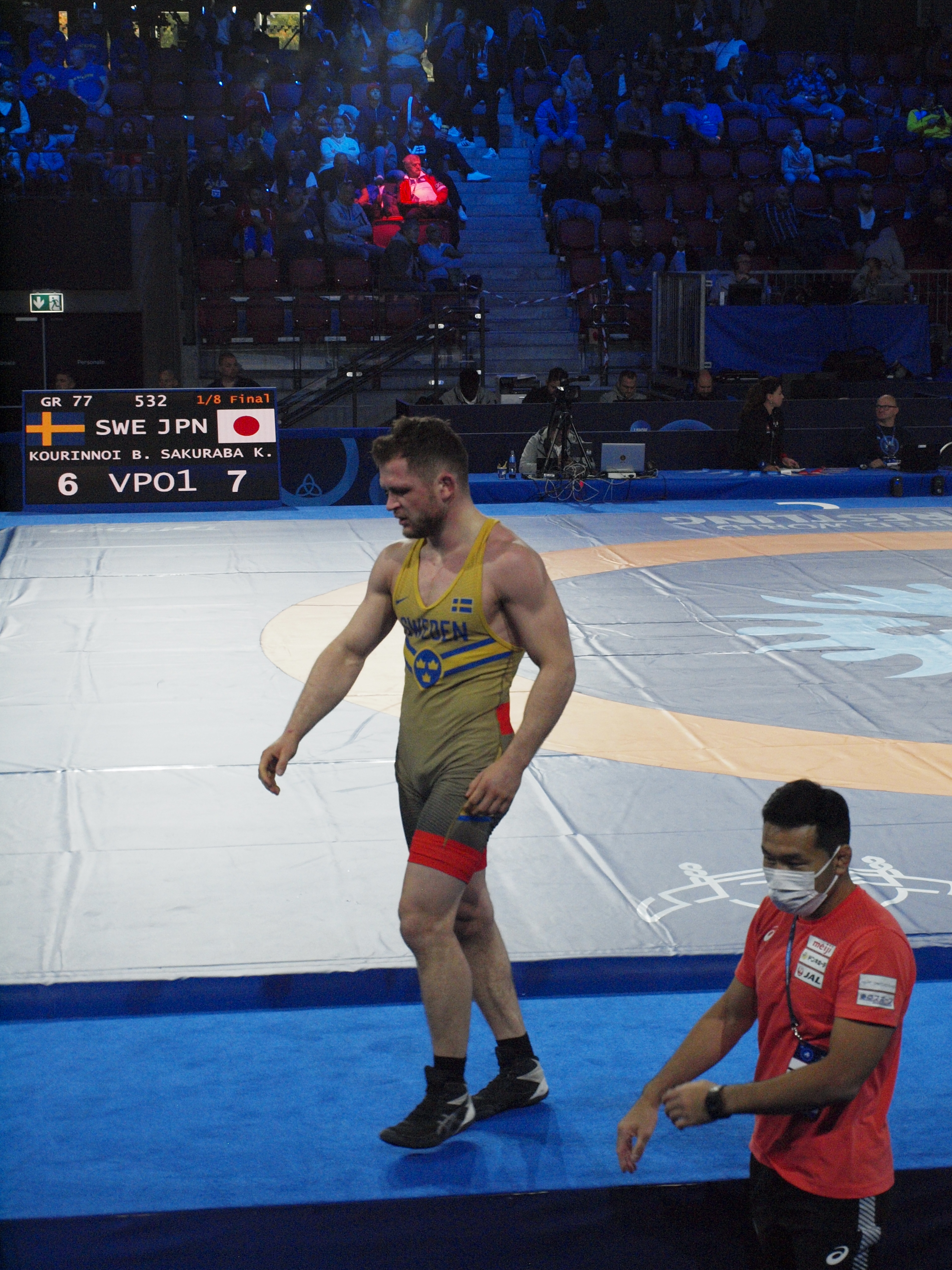
- Bogdan Kourinnoi at the 2021 World Wrestling Championships in Oslo, Norway

Personal information
- Born: 15 December 1993 (age 32)
- Height: 173 cm (5 ft 8 in)

Sport
- Country: Sweden
- Sport: Amateur wrestling
- Event: Greco-Roman
Medal record
Men's Greco-Roman wrestling
Representing Sweden
European Championships
Bronze medal – third place	2020 Rome	82 kg

Bogdan Kourinnoi (born 15 December 1993) is a Swedish Greco-Roman wrestler. He won one of the bronze medals in the 82 kg event at the 2020 European Wrestling Championships held in Rome, Italy.

== Career ==
Kourinnoi competed in the 80 kg event at the 2017 European Wrestling Championships held in Novi Sad, Serbia.

In 2019, Kourinnoi competed in the 82 kg event at the World Wrestling Championships held in Nur-Sultan, Kazakhstan. He was eliminated in his first match by Zoltán Lévai of Hungary.

== Achievements ==
Year	Tournament	Location	Result	Event
2020	European Championships	Rome, Italy	3rd	Greco-Roman 82 kg
