= Adlan Akiev =

Russian Greco-Roman wrestler

Adlan Akiev Адлан Акиев
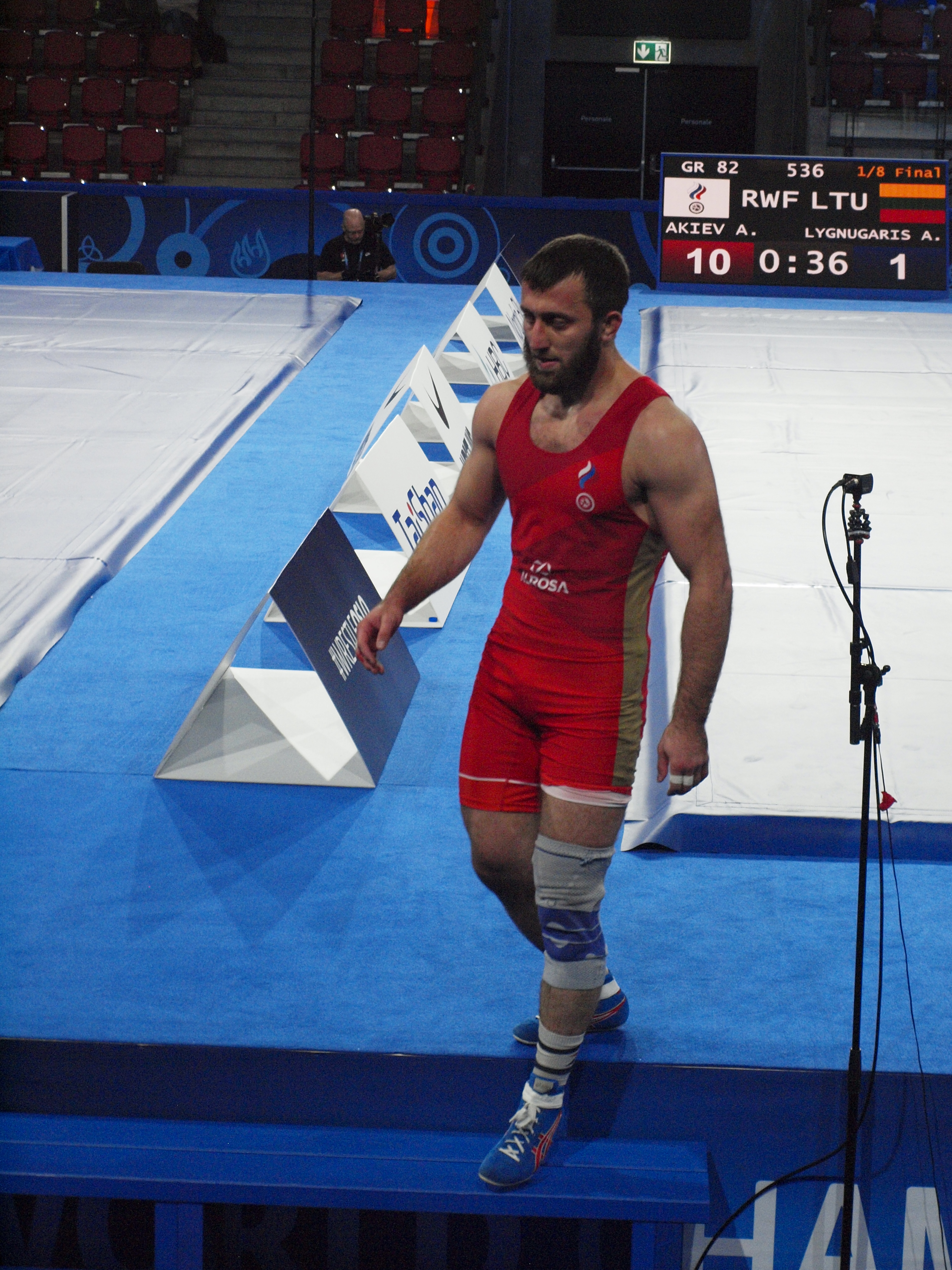

Personal information
- National team: Russia
- Born: March 30, 1993 (age 33) Chechnya, Russia
- Height: 176 cm (5 ft 9 in)
- Weight: 82 kg (181 lb)

Sport
- Country: Russia
- Sport: Amateur wrestling
- Event: Greco-Roman
- Club: Dmitry Mindiashvili's wrestling academy
Medal record
Men's Greco-Roman wrestling
Representing Russian Wrestling Federation
World Championships
Bronze medal – third place	2021 Oslo	82 kg
Representing Russia
European Championships
Gold medal – first place	2021 Warsaw	82 kg
Bronze medal – third place	2017 Novi Sad	80 kg

Adlan Dzhunidovich Akiev (Russian: Адлан Джунидович Акиев), is a Russian Greco-Roman wrestler. He won one of the bronze medals in the 82 kg event at the 2021 World Wrestling Championships held in Oslo, Norway. In 2021, he also won the gold medal in the 82 kg event at the European Wrestling Championships held in Warsaw, Poland.

== Career ==
At the 2017 European Wrestling Championships held in Novi Sad, Serbia, he won one of the bronze medals in the 80 kg event. In his bronze medal match he defeated Daniel Aleksandrov of Bulgaria.

In March 2021, he won the gold medal in the 82 kg event at the Matteo Pellicone Ranking Series 2021 held in Rome, Italy.

== Achievements ==
Year	Tournament	Location	Result	Event
2017	European Championships	Novi Sad, Serbia	3rd	Greco-Roman 80 kg
2021	European Championships	Warsaw, Poland	1st	Greco-Roman 82 kg
2021	World Championships	Oslo, Norway	3rd	Greco-Roman 82 kg
