= Ben Provisor =

American Greco-Roman wrestler

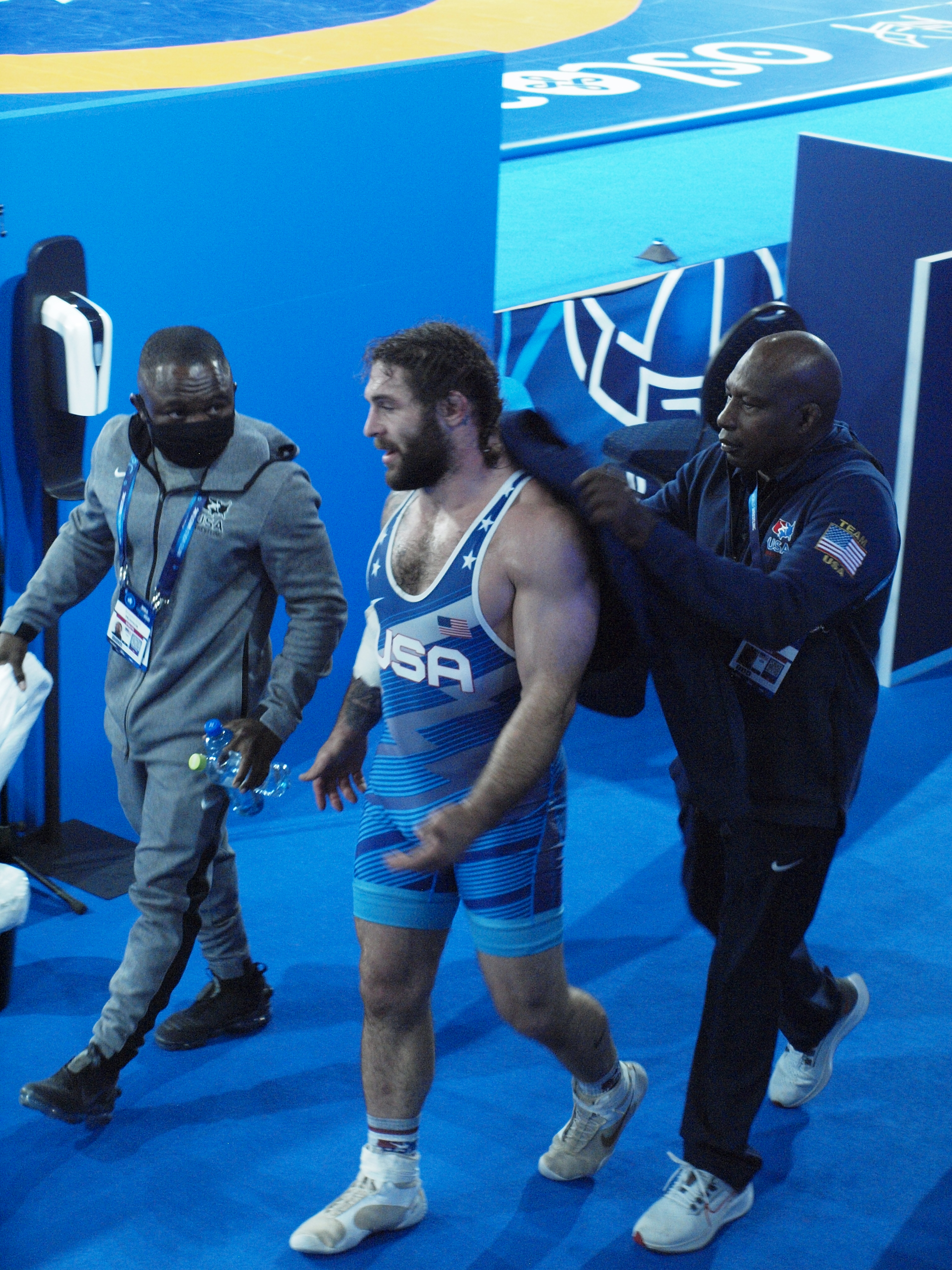
- Provisor in 2021

Personal information
- Born: June 26, 1990 (age 36) Stevens Point, Wisconsin, U.S.
- Height: 5 ft 8 in (173 cm)
- Weight: 187 lb (85 kg)

Sport
- Style: Greco-Roman, Freestyle and Folkstyle
- Club: New York Athletic Club; Sunkist Kids Wrestling Club
- College team: Northern Michigan (Greco); Grand View (Folkstyle)
Medal record
Men's Greco-Roman wrestling
Representing United States
Pan American Games
Silver medal – second place	2011 Guadalajara	74 kg
Pan American Championships
Gold medal – first place	2017 Salvador	85 kg
Gold medal – first place	2021 Guatemala City	82 kg
Bronze medal – third place	2018 Lima	87 kg
Men's freestyle wrestling
Representing United States
Pan American Championships
Gold medal – first place	2018 Lima	92 kg

Ben Provisor (born June 26, 1990) is an American wrestler. He won the 2012 U.S. Olympic Trials at 74 kg in Greco-Roman, and competed at the 2012 Olympics. He also competed at the 2016 Olympics as a Greco-Roman wrestler.

== Wrestling career ==
Provisor is a three-time U.S. Open champion (2011, 2013, and 2018).

He defeated Aaron Sieracki 2 to 1 at the finals of the 2012 U.S. Olympic Trials in Greco-Roman wrestling. In the 1/8 finals at the 2012 Summer Olympics, Provisor was defeated by Zurab Datunashvili of Georgia (0-1, 0-6). Provisor was coached by Olympic silver-medalist and Greco-Roman World Champion Dennis Hall.

At the 2016 Summer Olympics, he competed in the men's light-heavyweight (85 kg) division in Greco-Roman wrestling. He lost to Rustam Assakalov in the second round.

In 2021, Provisor signed to wrestle for the collegiate wrestling NAIA powerhouse Grand View Vikings.

== Personal life ==
Provisor is the son of musician Dennis Provisor, former keyboard player for the rock band The Grass Roots.

He was married to wrestler Leigh Jaynes.

He has one living child. Provisor attended SPASH high school in Stevens Point, Wisconsin.
