= Elvin Mursaliyev =

Azerbaijani Greco-Roman wrestler

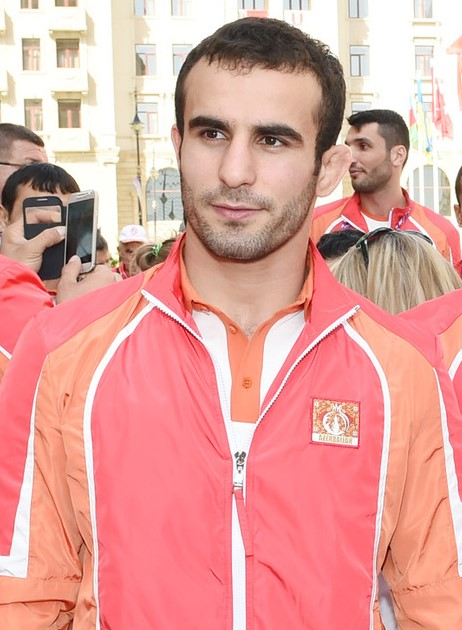

Medal record

Men's Greco-Roman wrestling

Representing Azerbaijan

World Championships
Bronze medal – third place	2014 Tashkent	75 kg
Bronze medal – third place	2017 Paris	80 kg

European Championships
Silver medal – second place	2010 Baku	74 kg
Bronze medal – third place	2014 Vantaa	75 kg
Bronze medal – third place	2018 Kaspiysk	77 kg

European Games
Gold medal – first place	2015 Baku	75 kg

Islamic Solidarity Games
Gold medal – first place	2017 Baku	75 kg

World Cup
Gold medal – first place	2015 Tehran	Team

Elvin Mursaliyev (Azerbaijani: Elvin Mürsəliyev, born 17 August 1988 in Baku) is an Azerbaijani Greco-Roman wrestler who won the silver medal at the 2010 European Wrestling Championships, also he won bronze medal at the 2014 European Wrestling Championships.
