= Zurabi Datunashvili =

Georgian-Serbian wrestler

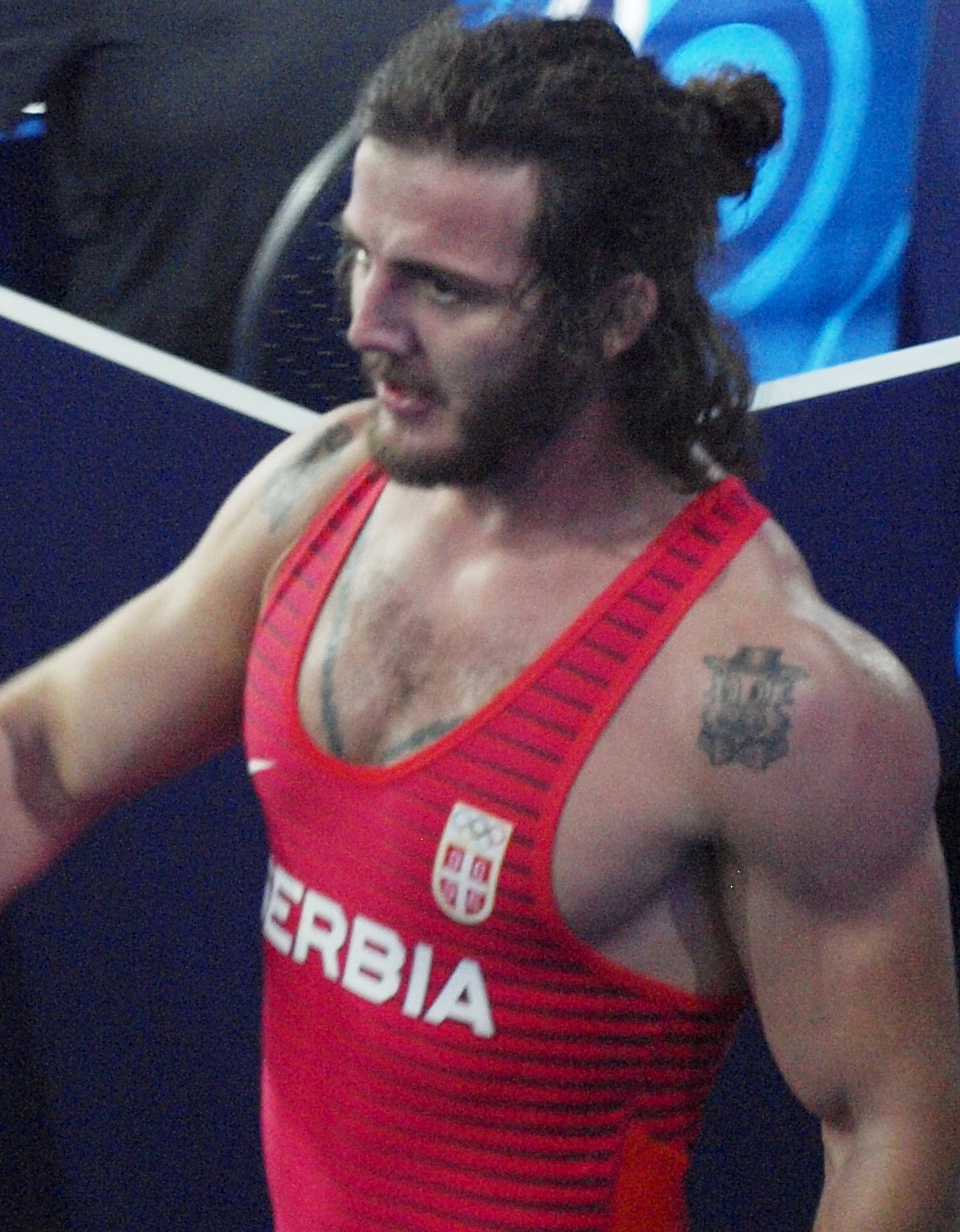
- Datunashvili at 2021 World Wrestling Championships

Personal information
- Nationality: Georgia; Serbia
- Born: 18 June 1991 (age 35) Tbilisi, Georgia, Soviet Union
- Height: 1.83 m (6 ft 0 in)
- Weight: 87 kg (192 lb)

Sport
- Style: Greco-Roman
- Club: National Club of Georgia
- Coach: Viliam Kharazov
Medal record
Men's Greco-Roman wrestling
Representing Serbia
Olympic Games
Disqualified	2020 Tokyo	87 kg
World Championships
Disqualified	2021 Oslo	87 kg
Disqualified	2022 Belgrade	87 kg
European Championships
Gold medal – first place	2021 Warsaw	87 kg
Individual World Cup
Bronze medal – third place	2020 Belgrade	87 kg
Vehbi Emre & Hamit Kaplan Tournament
Disqualified	2022 Istanbul	87 kg
Representing Georgia
European Championships
Gold medal – first place	2016 Riga	75 kg
Gold medal – first place	2017 Novi Sad	80 kg
Silver medal – second place	2013 Tbilisi	74 kg

Zurabi Datunashvili (Georgian: ზურაბ დათუნაშვილი, Serbian: Зураб Датунашвили / Zurab Datunašvili; born 18 June 1991) is a Georgian-born Serbian former Greco-Roman wrestler who competed in the men's middleweight category.

== Career ==
He won a silver medal in the same weight division at the 2013 European Wrestling Championships, coincidentally in his home city Tbilisi, losing out to defending Olympic champion Roman Vlasov of Russia.

Datunashvili represented Georgia at the 2012 Summer Olympics in London, where he competed in the men's 74 kg class. He defeated South Korea's Kim Jin-Hyeok, and United States' Ben Provisor in the preliminary rounds, before losing out the quarterfinal match to Azerbaijan's Emin Ahmadov, with a three-set technical score (3–0, 0–3, 0–4), and a classification point score of 1–3.

In World Wrestling Championships 2014 for bronze medal in the 75 kg he lost to Elvin Mursaliyev of Azerbaijan (1—1).

At the 2016 Summer Olympics, he was knocked out in the first round by Doszhan Kartikov. In November 2016, Datunashvili was disqualified from the 2016 European Cup of Nations after engaging in a mid-match fist fight with his Russian opponent, Imil Sharafetdinov, who was also disqualified. The fist fight descended into a brawl after the two wrestlers' coaches, as well as several fans, joined the melee. "The guys just failed to cope with their emotions, but they swiftly calmed themselves down and were shaking hands several minutes afterward," Gogi Koguashvili, the head coach of the Russian national wrestling team, later remarked.

In 2018, Datunashvili accused the Georgian Wrestling Federation of favouritism and corruption. On 11 January 2019, he was assaulted by Gega Gegeshidze, the president of the Georgian Wrestling Federation, following a match with Robert Kobliashvili which Datunashvili lost by referee's decision. The incident was captured on video. "I don't want him [Gegeshidze] to be arrested, I want him to resign," Datunashvili later told Radio Free Europe/Radio Liberty. "He's not man enough to speak the truth, but I feel that truth will prevail. Everyone saw that he hit me with a blunt metal object of some kind." On 20 January, the Georgian Police announced they were opening an investigation into the incident.

In 2020, he won one of the bronze medals in the 87 kg event at the Individual Wrestling World Cup held in Belgrade, Serbia. In 2021, he won a bronze medal in Tokyo, at the Olympic games for the Serbian national team (although this was later disqualified due to doping.)

In 2022, he won the silver medal in his event at the Vehbi Emre & Hamit Kaplan Tournament held in Istanbul, Turkey. He won the gold medal in the 87 kg event at the 2022 World Wrestling Championships held in Belgrade, Serbia.

In November 2023, Datunashvili was issued with a five-year ban backdated to April 2023 for anti-doping rule violations relating to "use of a prohibited method (urine substitution) and of the tampering with any part of doping control (use of fabricated evidence)". In addition all of his results from May 2021 to April 2023 were disqualified (including the bronze medal won at the 2020 Tokyo Olympics and the gold medals won at the 2021 and 2022 UWW World Championships). An appeal to the ruling by Datunashvili was dismissed by the Court of Arbitration for Sport in November 2025.

== Personal life ==
A supporter of the former president Mikheil Saakashvili, Datunashvili dedicated him his 2021 World Championship medal. Datunashvili was arrested on 4 December 2024 during the ongoing pro-European protests in Georgia. He was released on 7 December. He is a member of the political council of the Ahali party.
