= Aslan Atem =

Turkish wrestler (born 1991)

Personal information
- Nationality: Turkish
- Born: January 7, 1991 (age 35)
- Height: 177 cm (5 ft 10 in)
- Weight: 80 kg (180 lb)

Sport
- Country: Turkey
- Sport: Wrestling
- Event: Greco-Roman
- Team: Istanbul BB SK
- Turned pro: 1998
- Coached by: Yusuf Düzer (since 2009)
Medal record
Men's Greco-Roman wrestling
Representing Turkey
World Championships
Silver medal – second place	2016 Budapest	80 kg
European Championships
Bronze medal – third place	2017 Novi Sad	80 kg
Bronze medal – third place	2016 Riga	80 kg
World University Championship
Silver medal – second place	2016 Çorum	80 kg

Aslan Atem (born January 7, 1991) is a Turkish wrestler of Turkish Meskhetian origin, competing in the 80 kg division of Greco-Roman wrestling. He is a member of the İstanbul Büyükşehir Belediyesi S.K.

Atem debuted internationally at the 2008 European Championships for Cadets and won the gold medal in the 76 kg division in Daugavpils, Latvia. At the 2010 Mediterranean Championship held in Istanbul, Turkey, he became bronze medalist in the 84 kg division. Atem won the gold medal in the 84 kg division at the 2010 European Championships for Juniors in Samokov, Bulgaria. He became bronze medalist at the 2016 European Wrestling Championships in Riga, Latvia. He won the silver medal at the 2016 World University Wrestling Championship held in Çorum, Turkey. He was silver medalist at the Golden Grand Prix 2016 in Baju, Azerbaijan. He captured the silver medal at the 2016 World Wrestling Championships held in Budapest, Hungary. He became bronze medalist at the 2017 European Wrestling Championships in Novi Sad, Serbia.
