= Dmytro Pyshkov =

Ukrainian Greco-Roman wrestler

Personal information
- Full name: Dmytro Pyshkov
- Nationality: Ukraine
- Born: August 8, 1986 (age 39) Luhansk, Ukraine
- Weight: 75 kg (165 lb)

Sport
- Sport: Wrestling
- Event: Greco-Roman
Medal record
Men's Greco-Roman wrestling
Representing Ukraine
European Championships
Bronze medal – third place	2010 Baku	74 kg
Summer Universiade
Bronze medal – third place	2013 Kazan	74 kg
European Games
Bronze medal – third place	2015 Baku	75 kg
Military Games
Bronze medal – third place	2015 Mungyeong	75 kg

Dmytro Pyshkov (Ukrainian: Дмитро Пишков; born August 8, 1986, in Luhansk) is an amateur Ukrainian Greco-Roman wrestler.

Pyshkov won a bronze medal in the 2010 European Wrestling Championships.
