= Yousef Ghaderian =

Iranian Greco-Roman wrestler

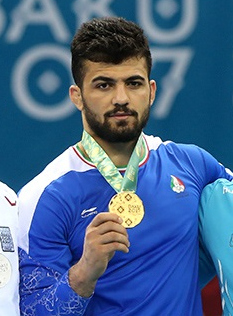
- Ghaderian at the 2017 Islamic Solidarity Games

Personal information
- Full name: Yousef Ghaderian
- Nationality: Iranian
- Born: February 14, 1993 (age 33) Saqqez, Kurdistan Province, Iran
- Height: 180 cm (5 ft 11 in)

Sport
- Country: Iran
- Sport: Greco-Roman wrestling
- Coached by: Farhin Esmailnejad; Mohammad Reza Vezmouradi
Medal record
Representing Iran
World Championships
Bronze medal – third place	2015 Las Vegas	80 kg
Asian Championships
Gold medal – first place	2015 Doha	80 kg
Silver medal – second place	2014 Astana	80 kg
Islamic Solidarity Games
Gold medal – first place	2017 Baku	80 kg
Youth Olympic Games
Bronze medal – third place	2010 Singapore	69 kg

Yousef Ghaderian (Persian: یوسف قادریان, born 14 February 1993) is a Greco-Roman wrestler from Iran. Competing in the 80 kg division he won a bronze medal at the 2015 World Championships and a gold medal at the 2015 Asian Championships.
