= Radzik Kuliyeu =

Russian-Belarusian wrestler

Radik Kuliev Радик Кулиев
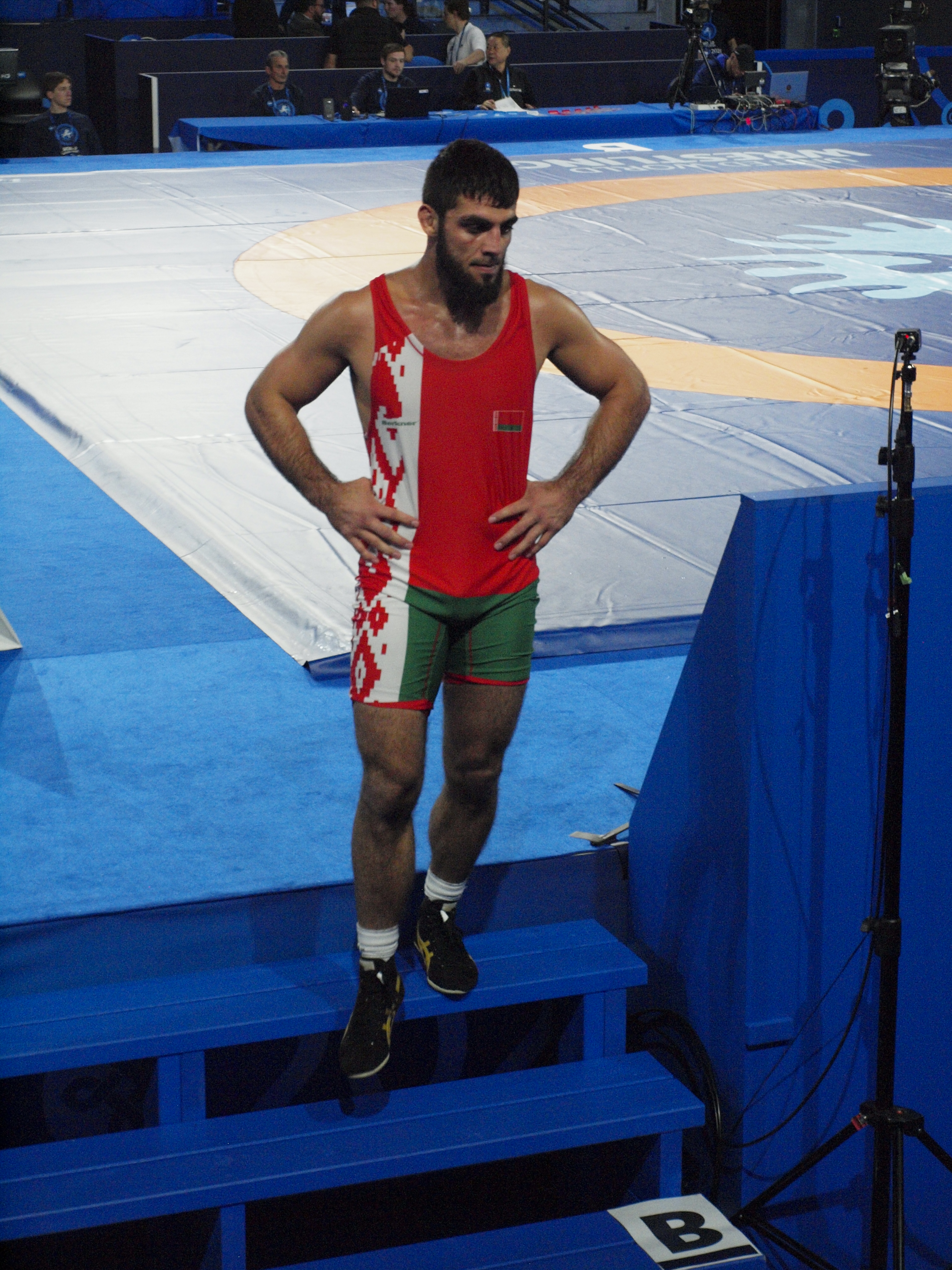

Personal information
- Full name: Radik Nebievich Kuliev
- Nationality: Russian; Belarusian
- Born: July 10, 1992 (age 34) Kurush village, Khasavyurtovsky District, Dagestan, Russia
- Weight: 85 kg (187 lb); 80 kg (176 lb)

Sport
- Country: Russia; Belarus
- Sport: Wrestling
- Rank: International master of sports
- Event: Greco-Roman
- Coached by: Malik Eskanderov, Vyacheslav Maksimovich, Alim Selimov
Medal record
Men's Greco-Roman wrestling
Representing Belarus
World Championships
Silver medal – second place	2017 Paris	80 kg
European Championships
Silver medal – second place	2017 Novi Sad	80 kg
Individual World Cup
Bronze medal – third place	2020 Belgrade	82 kg

Radzik Nebievich Kuliyeu (Russian: Радик Небиевич Кулиев; born July 10, 1992, in Dagestan) also known as Radik Kuliev is a Russian-Belarusian Greco-Roman wrestler of Lezgin heritage, who competed for the 2017 European Wrestling Championships and won silver medal at 80 kilos. At the 2017 World Wrestling Championships he became runner-up.

In 2020, he won one of the bronze medals in the 82 kg event at the 2020 Individual Wrestling World Cup held in Belgrade, Serbia.
