= Viktar Sasunouski =

Belarusian Greco-Roman wrestler

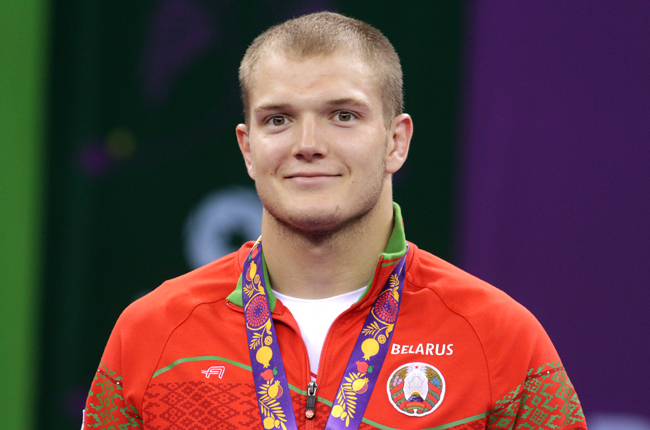

Personal information
- Born: 29 June 1989 (age 37) Barysaw, Byelorussian SSR, Soviet Union
- Height: 1.80 m (5 ft 11 in)
- Weight: 80 kg (180 lb)

Sport
- Sport: Greco-Roman wrestling
- Club: Dynamo
- Coached by: Aleh Azhyhau
Medal record
Representing Belarus
World Championships
Silver medal – second place	2015 Las Vegas	-80 kg
Bronze medal – third place	2018 Budapest	82 kg
European Games
Bronze medal – third place	2015 Baku	-80 kg

Viktar Sasunouski (born 29 June 1989) is a Greco-Roman wrestler from Belarus. He competed in the 80 kg weight category at the 2014 and 2015 World Championships and won a silver medal in 2015.

In March 2021, he competed at the European Qualification Tournament in Budapest, Hungary hoping to qualify for the 2020 Summer Olympics in Tokyo, Japan.
