= Božo Starčević =

Croatian Greco-Roman wrestler

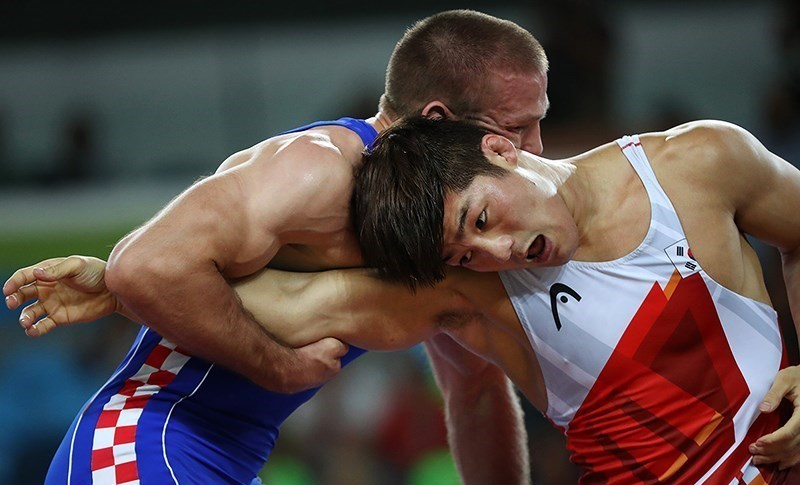
- Starčević (left) at 2016 Olympics

Personal information
- Born: 11 December 1988 (age 37) Zagreb, SR Croatia, SFR Yugoslavia
- Height: 172 cm (5 ft 8 in)

Sport
- Sport: Greco-Roman wrestling
- Weight class: 77 kg (170 lb)
- Club: Metalac
- Coached by: Nikola Starčević
Medal record
Men's Greco-Roman wrestling
Representing Croatia
European Championships
Bronze medal – third place	2013 Tbilisi	74 kg
Mediterranean Games
Bronze medal – third place	2018 Tarragona	77 kg

Božo Starčević (born 11 December 1988 in Zagreb) is a male Greco-Roman wrestler from Croatia.

His best achievement is the bronze medal at the 2013 European Wrestling Championships – Men's Greco-Roman 74 kg in Tbilisi, Georgia.

== Early life ==
Already at the young age, everybody noticed his talent and spirit for sport activities. Before he started wrestling at age 10, he had been training gymnastics. He started training wrestling at wrestling club "Metalac" in Zagreb. His first coach was Mario Baić.

In 1999, just after one week of training, he won his first gold medal in wrestling, in the 29 kg category. It was at an international boys tournament in Slovenia.

== Career ==
Božo, at age 18, competed in the 2007 World Junior Championship in Beijing. He finished at 5th place in the 60 kg category.

At the 2008 European Junior Championship in Slovakia, he finished 5th again in the 66 kg category.

Shortly after changing his weight category (74 kg) and entering in seniors, he managed to win the Croatian national championship in 2009, 2010 and 2011.

In 2010, he was finally invited to his first senior 2010 European Wrestling Championships in Baku, Azerbaijan. He ended on 8th place with 2 wins and 2 defeats.

In 2012, he got an invitation for the 2012 European Wrestling Championships in Belgrade, and he repeated his result from 2010, ending on 8th place.

In 2013 he won a bronze medal at the 2013 European Wrestling Championships – Men's Greco-Roman 74 kg in Tbilisi, Georgia.

In March 2021, he qualified at the European Qualification Tournament to compete at the 2020 Summer Olympics in Tokyo, Japan.

He is a member of wrestling club "Metalac" from Zagreb. His coach is his brother - Nikola Starčević.
