= Daniel Aleksandrov (wrestler) =

Bulgarian Greco-Roman wrestler

Daniel Alexandrov
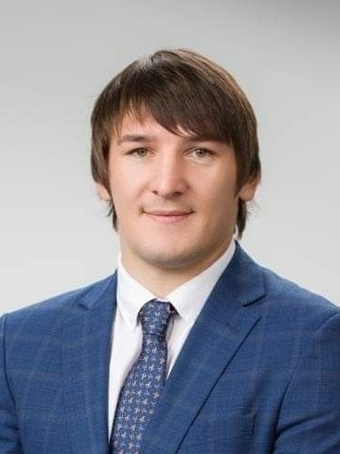

Personal information
- Nationality: Bulgarian
- Born: September 13, 1991 (age 34) Bulgaria
- Weight: 80 kg (180 lb; 13 st)

Sport
- Sport: Wrestling
- Event: Greco-Roman
- Coached by: Denislav Chamishki
Medal record
Representing Bulgaria
European Championships
Silver medal – second place	2020 Rome	82 kg
Bronze medal – third place	2016 Riga	80 kg
Bronze medal – third place	2018 Kaspiysk	82 kg
European Games
Bronze medal – third place	2015 Baku	80 kg

Daniel Tihomirov Aleksandrov (born September 13, 1991) is a Bulgarian Greco-Roman wrestler. He competed in the men's Greco-Roman 75 kg event at the 2016 Summer Olympics, in which he was eliminated in the round of 16 by Péter Bácsi.

In March 2021, he competed at the European Qualification Tournament in Budapest, Hungary hoping to qualify for the 2020 Summer Olympics in Tokyo, Japan.
