= 2011 World Wrestling Championships – Men's freestyle 84 kg =

Men's freestyle 84 kg at the 2011 World Championships
- Venue: Sinan Erdem Dome
- Dates: 17 September 2011
- Competitors: 46 from 46 nations

Medalists
gold medal	Sharif Sharifov	Azerbaijan
silver medal	Ibragim Aldatov	Ukraine
bronze medal	Dato Marsagishvili	Georgia
bronze medal	Albert Saritov	Russia

The men's freestyle 84 kilograms is a competition featured at the 2011 World Wrestling Championships, and was held at the Sinan Erdem Dome in Istanbul, Turkey on 17 September 2011.

== Results ==
Legend

- F — Won by fall

=== Finals ===
Semifinals				Final
Armands Zvirbulis (LAT)	2	0	1
Ibragim Aldatov (UKR)	0	2	4	Ibragim Aldatov (UKR)	0	0
Albert Saritov (RUS)	1	3		Sharif Sharifov (AZE)	1	2
Sharif Sharifov (AZE)	3	4

=== Top half ===
==== Section 1 ====
Round of 64

Round of 32
Siriguleng (CHN)	1	0	1
Jeff Adamson (CAN)	0	1	0
Armands Zvirbulis (LAT)	1	1
Nate Ackerman (GBR)	0	0
Jaime Espinal (PUR)	5	2
Pürveegiin Ösökhbaatar (MGL)	1	1
Radosław Marcinkiewicz (POL)	3	6
Andreas Sitanaris (CYP)	0	0

Round of 16
Siriguleng (CHN)	0	0
Armands Zvirbulis (LAT)	1	2
Jaime Espinal (PUR)	1	2
Radosław Marcinkiewicz (POL)	0	1

Quarterfinals
Armands Zvirbulis (LAT)	2	2	5
Jaime Espinal (PUR)	0	2	1

==== Section 2 ====
Round of 64

Round of 32
Dato Marsagishvili (GEO)	3	1
Emzarios Bentinidis (GRE)	2	0
Marco Riesen (SUI)	1	2	0
Gheorghiță Ștefan (ROU)	0	3	1
Amarhajy Mahamedau (BLR)	1	1
Aibek Usupov (KGZ)	0	0
Piotr Ianulov (MDA)	0	0
Ibragim Aldatov (UKR)	1	4

Round of 16
Dato Marsagishvili (GEO)	3	1
Gheorghiță Ștefan (ROU)	1	0
Amarhajy Mahamedau (BLR)	0	0
Ibragim Aldatov (UKR)	1	2

Quarterfinals
Dato Marsagishvili (GEO)	1	5	0
Ibragim Aldatov (UKR)	1	3	5

=== Bottom half ===
==== Section 3 ====
Round of 64
Egzon Shala (ALB)	2	2
Yusup Abdusalomov (TJK)	4	6^{F}
Jarlis Mosquera (COL)	0	0
Albert Saritov (RUS)	2	1
Adrian Jaoude (BRA)	0	0
Shinya Matsumoto (JPN)	2	2
Waylon Muller (MHL)	0	0
Andrea Sorbello (ITA)	7	6
Alex Dolly (IRL)	3	6
Óscar Martínez (HON)	1	0
René Matejov (SVK)	0	2
Dejan Bogdanov (MKD)	6	4

Round of 32
Zaurbek Sokhiev (UZB)	3	7
Jason Balabal (PHI)	1	0
Yusup Abdusalomov (TJK)	0	0
Albert Saritov (RUS)	1	1
Shinya Matsumoto (JPN)	1	0	3
Andrea Sorbello (ITA)	0	1	0
Alex Dolly (IRL)	3	6
Dejan Bogdanov (MKD)	0	0

Round of 16
Zaurbek Sokhiev (UZB)	0	0
Albert Saritov (RUS)	1	1
Shinya Matsumoto (JPN)	0	2	4
Alex Dolly (IRL)	1	0	3

Quarterfinals
Albert Saritov (RUS)	1	3
Shinya Matsumoto (JPN)	0	0

==== Section 4 ====
Round of 64
István Veréb (HUN)	7	0	0
Mihail Ganev (BUL)	5	1	2
Gadzhimurad Nurmagomedov (ARM)	1	1	0
Serdar Böke (TUR)	0	1	2
Davyd Bichinashvili (GER)	3	3
Adnan Rhimi (TUN)	0	0
José Daniel Díaz (VEN)	0	1
Alireza Goudarzi (IRI)	2	2
Yermek Baiduashov (KAZ)	3	7
Pawan Kumar (IND)	0	0
Sergey Kolesnikov (ISR)	0	0
Boris Andonov (ESP)	1	2
Sharif Sharifov (AZE)	6	2
Yoon Chan-uk (KOR)	0	0
Alejandro Gallardo (MEX)	0	0
Cael Sanderson (USA)	6	7

Round of 32
Mihail Ganev (BUL)	3	2
Serdar Böke (TUR)	0	1
Davyd Bichinashvili (GER)	0	1
Alireza Goudarzi (IRI)	1	2
Yermek Baiduashov (KAZ)	5	8
Boris Andonov (ESP)	0	3
Sharif Sharifov (AZE)	3	4
Cael Sanderson (USA)	1	1

Round of 16
Mihail Ganev (BUL)	0	0
Alireza Goudarzi (IRI)	2	2
Yermek Baiduashov (KAZ)	0	0
Sharif Sharifov (AZE)	3	3

Quarterfinals
Alireza Goudarzi (IRI)	1	1
Sharif Sharifov (AZE)	2	3

=== Repechage ===
Repechage round 1
Yoon Chan-uk (KOR)	0
Cael Sanderson (USA)	3^{F}

Repechage round 2
Piotr Ianulov (MDA)	1	0
Amarhajy Mahamedau (BLR)	3	6
Cael Sanderson (USA)	4	0	2
Yermek Baiduashov (KAZ)	3	1	1

Repechage round 3
Amarhajy Mahamedau (BLR)	0	0
Dato Marsagishvili (GEO)	4	6
Cael Sanderson (USA)	6	1
Alireza Goudarzi (IRI)	0	0

Bronze medals
Dato Marsagishvili (GEO)	6	4
Armands Zvirbulis (LAT)	0	0
Cael Sanderson (USA)	0	0
Albert Saritov (RUS)	1	3
