= Mohammad Hossein Mohammadian =

Iranian freestyle wrestler

Personal information
- Born: August 19, 1992 (age 33) Sari, Iran
- Website: Official Instagram Profile

Sport
- Country: Iran
- Sport: Freestyle wrestling
Medal record
Men's freestyle wrestling
Representing Iran
World Championships
Bronze medal – third place	2014 Tashkent	86 kg
Asian Championships
Gold medal – first place	2015 Doha	97 kg
Gold medal – first place	2022 Ulaanbaatar	97 kg
Bronze medal – third place	2024 Bishkek	97 kg
Military World Games
Gold medal – first place	2019 Wuhan	97 kg
Summer Universiade
Bronze medal – third place	2013 Kazan	84 kg
Yasar Dogu Tournament
Gold medal – first place	2022 Istanbul	97 kg

Mohammad Hossein Mohammadian (Persian: محمدحسین محمدیان, born August 19, 1992) is an Iranian freestyle wrestler who competes at 97 kilograms. He was a bronze medalist at the 2014 World Championships and at the 2013 Summer Universiade and the 2015 Asian Continental Champion, before receiving a four-year suspension handed by United World Wrestling due to performance-enhancing drugs use in December 2015.

He came back after his suspension in 2019, and has since claimed championships from the 2019 Military World Games and represented Iran at the 2020 Summer Olympics.

== Major results ==
Year	Competition	Venue	Position	Event	Notes
Representing Iran
2013	Summer Universiade	Kazan, Russia	3rd	Freestyle 84 kg	
2014	World Championships	Tashkent, Uzbekistan	3rd	Freestyle 86 kg	
2015	Asian Continental Championships	Doha, Qatar	1st	Freestyle 97 kg	
2019	Military World Games	Wuhan, China	1st	Freestyle 97 kg	
2021	Asian Olympic Qualification Tournament	Almaty, Kazakhstan	1st	Freestyle 97 kg	

== Freestyle record ==
International Senior Freestyle Matches
Res.	Record	Opponent	Score	Date	Event	Location
2022 Yasar Dogu (gold) at 97 kg
Win	68–8	(Russia) Alikhan Zhabrailov	4–3	February 24–27, 2022	2022 Yasar Dogu	Istanbul, Turkey
Win	67–8	(Turkey) Mustafa Sessiz	TF 10–0	February 24–27, 2022	2022 Yasar Dogu	Istanbul, Turkey
Win	66–8	(Kazakhstan) Mamed Ibragimov	TF 16–4	February 24–27, 2022	2022 Yasar Dogu	Istanbul, Turkey
Win	65–8	(Uzbekistan) Mukhammadrasul Rakhimov	TF 11–0	February 24–27, 2022	2022 Yasar Dogu	Istanbul, Turkey
2022 Iran Nationals (gold) at 97 kg
Win	64–8	(Iran) Esmaiil Eejatian	3–1	2022	2022 Iran Nationals	(Iran) Gorgan
Win	63–8	(Iran) FF	FF	2022	2022 Iran Nationals	(Iran) Gorgan
Win	62–8	(Iran) FF	Fall	2022	2022 Iran Nationals	(Iran) Gorgan
Win	61–8	(Iran) Ali Shabani	5–4	2022	2022 Iran Nationals	(Iran) Gorgan
Win	60–8	(Iran) FF	TF 10–0	2022	2022 Iran Nationals	(Iran) Gorgan
2021 Imam Memorial Premier Cup (silver) for Fuladin Zob Amol at 97 kg
Win	59–8	(Iran) Mojtaba Goleij	2–2	12 November 2021	2021 Imam Memorial Premier Cup	Tehran, Iran
Win	58–8	(Iran) Amirali Azarpira	TF 10–0	29 October 2021	2021 Imam Memorial Premier Cup	Tehran, Iran
2021 World Military Championships (gold) at 97 kg
Win	57–8	(Russia) Erik Dzioev	TF 10–0	November 21–24, 2021	2021 CISM World Military Championships	Tehran, Iran
Win	56–8	(Algeria) Mohammed Fardj	INJ (8–0)	November 21–24, 2021	2021 CISM World Military Championships	Tehran, Iran
Win	55–8	(Russia) Erik Dzioev	TF 10–0	November 21–24, 2021	2021 CISM World Military Championships	Tehran, Iran
Win	54–8	(Guinea) Thomas Aboubacar Sylia	TF 12–0	November 21–24, 2021	2021 CISM World Military Championships	Tehran, Iran
2020 Summer Olympics DNP at 97 kg
Loss	53–8	(Georgia (country)) Elizbar Odikadze	3–6	August 6, 2021	2020 Summer Olympics	Tokyo, Japan
2021 Poland Open (gold) at 97 kg
Win	53–7	(Iran) Ali Shabani	1–1	June 8, 2021	2021 Poland Open	Warsaw, Poland
Win	52–7	(Iran) Alireza Karimi	2–2	June 8, 2021	2021 Poland Open	Warsaw, Poland
Win	51–7	(Kazakhstan) Bakytkhanovs	TF 10–0	June 8, 2021	2021 Poland Open	Warsaw, Poland
Win	50–7	(United States) Kollin Moore	TF 11–0	June 8, 2021	2021 Poland Open	Warsaw, Poland
2021 Asian Olympic Qualification Tournament (gold) at 97 kg
Win	49–7	(Uzbekistan) Magomed Ibragimov	Forfeit	April 11, 2021	2021 Asian Olympic Qualification Tournament	Almaty, Kazakhstan
Win	48–7	(India) Satyawart Kadian	TF 10–0	April 11, 2021	2021 Asian Olympic Qualification Tournament	Almaty, Kazakhstan
Win	47–7	(Turkmenistan) Zyýamuhammet Saparow	TF 15–4	April 11, 2021	2021 Asian Olympic Qualification Tournament	Almaty, Kazakhstan
Win	46–7	(Japan) Naoya Akaguma	TF 11–0	April 11, 2021	2021 Asian Olympic Qualification Tournament	Almaty, Kazakhstan
2020 IRI World Team Trials (silver) at 97 kg
Loss	45–7	(Iran) Ali Shabani	0–4	November 5, 2020	2020 Iranian World Team Trials	Tehran, Iran
Loss	45–6	(Iran) Ali Shabani	4–8	November 5, 2020	2020 Iranian World Team Trials	Tehran, Iran
Win	45–5	(Iran) Mojtaba Goleij	2–1	November 5, 2020	2020 Iranian World Team Trials	Tehran, Iran
Win	44–5	(Iran) Danial Shariati	5–0	November 5, 2020	2020 Iranian World Team Trials	Tehran, Iran
2020 Imam Memorial Premier Cup (gold) for Iranmal at 97 kg
Win	43–5	(Iran) FF	FF	12 November 2020	2020 Imam Memorial Premier Cup	Tehran, Iran
Win	42–5	(Iran) Ali Shabani	3–3			Tehran, Iran
Win	41–5	(Iran) FF	FF			Tehran, Iran
2020 Matteo Pellicone Ranking Series (gold) at 97 kg
Win	40–5	(Belarus) Aliaksandr Hushtyn	9–0	January 15–18, 2020	Matteo Pellicone Ranking Series 2020	Rome, Italy
Win	39–5	(Italy) Abraham Conyedo	TF 11–0	January 15–18, 2020	Matteo Pellicone Ranking Series 2020	Rome, Italy
Win	38–5	(United States) Kyle Snyder	Fall	January 15–18, 2020	Matteo Pellicone Ranking Series 2020	Rome, Italy
Win	37–5	(United States) Bo Nickal	TF 10–0	January 15–18, 2020	Matteo Pellicone Ranking Series 2020	Rome, Italy
Win	36–5	(Kazakhstan) Alisher Yergali	TF 11–0	January 15–18, 2020	Matteo Pellicone Ranking Series 2020	Rome, Italy
2019 World Clubs Cup (gold) as Team IRI at 97 kg
Win	35–5	(Iran) Hossein Shahbazi	9–0	December 17–21, 2019	2019 World Clubs Cup	Bojnord, Iran
Win	34–5	(India) FF	FF	December 17–21, 2019	2019 World Clubs Cup	Bojnord, Iran
Win	33–5	(Georgia (country)) Givi Gogoberishvili	TF 13–2	December 17–21, 2019	2019 World Clubs Cup	Bojnord, Iran
2019 Military World Games (gold) at 97 kg
Win	32–5	(Belarus) Aliaksandr Hushtyn	3–2	October 21–24, 2019	2019 Military World Games	Wuhan, China
Win	31–5	(Russia) Vladislav Baitcaev	TF 11–0	October 21–24, 2019	2019 Military World Games	Wuhan, China
Win	30–5	(Algeria) Mohammed Fardj	TF 12–0	October 21–24, 2019	2019 Military World Games	Wuhan, China
Win	29–5	(Ukraine) Andry Vlasov	TF 13–2	October 21–24, 2019	2019 Military World Games	Wuhan, China
2015 Poland Open (bronze) at 97 kg
Win	28–5	(Turkey) İbrahim Bölükbaşı	FF	July 24–26, 2015	2015 Poland Open	Warsaw, Poland
Win	27–5	(Japan) Toshihiro Yamaguchi	10–1	July 24–26, 2015	2015 Poland Open	Warsaw, Poland
Loss	26–5	(Georgia (country)) Elizbar Odikadze	2–5	July 24–26, 2015	2015 Poland Open	Warsaw, Poland
Win	26–4	(Belarus) Ivan Yankovsk	FF	July 24–26, 2015	2015 Poland Open	Warsaw, Poland
Win	25–4	(Spain) Héctor Rodríguez Iglesias	TF 11–0	July 24–26, 2015	2015 Poland Open	Warsaw, Poland
2015 Stepan Sargsyan Cup (gold) at 97 kg
Win	24–4	(Ukraine) Pavlo Oliynyk	2–1	July 18–19, 2015	2015 Stepan Sargsyan Cup	Yerevan, Armenia
Win	23–4	(United States) Wynn Michalak	9–3	July 18–19, 2015	2015 Stepan Sargsyan Cup	Yerevan, Armenia
Win	22–4	(Russia) Evgeniy Kolomiets	7–0	July 18–19, 2015	2015 Stepan Sargsyan Cup	Yerevan, Armenia
Win	21–4	(North Macedonia) Magomedgadzhi Nurov	12–10	July 18–19, 2015	2015 Stepan Sargsyan Cup	Yerevan, Armenia
2015 Asian Championships (gold) at 97 kg
Win	20–4	(Kyrgyzstan) Magomed Musaev	10–3	May 6–10, 2015	2015 Asian Continental Championships	Doha, Qatar
Win	19–4	(Japan) Takeshi Yamaguchi	14–9	May 6–10, 2015	2015 Asian Continental Championships	Doha, Qatar
Win	18–4	(Tajikistan) Rustam Iskandari	TF 13–2	May 6–10, 2015	2015 Asian Continental Championships	Doha, Qatar
Win	17–4	(Kazakhstan) Alikhan Jumayev	5–2	May 6–10, 2015	2015 Asian Continental Championships	Doha, Qatar
2015 World Cup (gold) as Team IRI at 97 kg
Loss	16–4	(United States) Jake Varner	3–3	April 11–12, 2015	2015 World Cup	(United States) Los Angeles, California
Win	16–3	(Turkey) İbrahim Bölükbaşı	4–4	April 11–12, 2015	2015 World Cup	(United States) Los Angeles, California
2015 Paris Grand Prix (silver) at 97 kg
Loss	15–3	(Azerbaijan) Sharif Sharifov	4–6	January 31 – February 1, 2015	2015 Grand Prix of Paris	Paris, France
Win	15–2	(Ukraine) Pavlo Oliynyk	6–2	January 31 – February 1, 2015	2015 Grand Prix of Paris	Paris, France
Win	14–2	(France) Milliere Quentin	TF 10–0	January 31 – February 1, 2015	2015 Grand Prix of Paris	Paris, France
Win	13–2	(China) Cui Xiaocheng	TF 11–0	January 31 – February 1, 2015	2015 Grand Prix of Paris	Paris, France
2014 World Championships (bronze) at 86 kg
Win	12–2	(Azerbaijan) Gamzat Osmanov	11–2	September 8, 2014	2014 World Championships	Tashkent, Uzbekistan
Win	11–2	(Japan) Shinya Matsumoto	TF 10–0	September 8, 2014	2014 World Championships	Tashkent, Uzbekistan
Loss	10–2	(Cuba) Reineris Salas	2–4	September 8, 2014	2014 World Championships	Tashkent, Uzbekistan
Win	10–1	(Venezuela) Pedro Ceballos	8–6	September 8, 2014	2014 World Championships	Tashkent, Uzbekistan
Win	9–1	(United States) Ed Ruth	7–4	September 8, 2014	2014 World Championships	Tashkent, Uzbekistan
Win	8–1	(Brazil) Adrian Jaoude	TF 10–0	September 8, 2014	2014 World Championships	Tashkent, Uzbekistan
2014 Poland Open (gold) at 84 kg
Win	7–1	(Turkey) Amarhajy Mahamedau	FF	August 2–3, 2014	2014 Poland Open	Dąbrowa Górnicza, Poland
Win	6–1	(Japan) Shinya Matsumoto	TF 10–0	August 2–3, 2014	2014 Poland Open	Dąbrowa Górnicza, Poland
Win	5–1	(Turkey) Ahmet Bilici	8–7	August 2–3, 2014	2014 Poland Open	Dąbrowa Górnicza, Poland
Win	4–1	(Hungary) Gábor Hatos	1–1	August 2–3, 2014	2014 Poland Open	Dąbrowa Górnicza, Poland
2013 Universidae Games (bronze) at 84 kg
Win	3–1	(Kazakhstan) Aslan Kakhidze	10–6	July 11–16, 2013	2013 World University Games	Kazan, Russia
Loss	2–1	(Russia) Shamil Kudiyamagomedov	5–7	July 11–16, 2013	2013 World University Games	Kazan, Russia
Win	2–0	(Armenia) Musa Murtazaliev	8–4	July 11–16, 2013	2013 World University Games	Kazan, Russia
Win	1–0	(United States) Ed Ruth	TF 10–0	July 11–16, 2013	2013 World University Games	Kazan, Russia
