= 2014 World Wrestling Championships – Men's freestyle 86 kg =

Men's freestyle 86 kg at the 2014 World Championships
- Venue: Gymnastics Sport Palace
- Dates: 8 September 2014
- Competitors: 38 from 38 nations

Medalists
gold medal	Abdulrashid Sadulaev	Russia
silver medal	Reineris Salas	Cuba
bronze medal	Selim Yaşar	Turkey
bronze medal	Mohammad Hossein Mohammadian	Iran

The men's freestyle 86 kilograms is a competition featured at the 2014 World Wrestling Championships, and was held in Tashkent, Uzbekistan on 8 September 2014.

== Results ==
Legend

- F — Won by fall
- WO — Won by walkover

=== Finals ===
Semifinals		Final
Aslan Kakhidze (KAZ)	0
Abdulrashid Sadulaev (RUS)	10	Abdulrashid Sadulaev (RUS)	10
Gamzat Osmanov (AZE)	0	Reineris Salas (CUB)	0
Reineris Salas (CUB)	1

=== Top half ===
==== Section 1 ====
Round of 64

Round of 32
Orgodolyn Üitümen (MGL)	4
Timofei Xenidis (GRE)	11
Aslan Kakhidze (KAZ)	10
Taimuraz Friev (ESP)	4
Dato Marsagishvili (GEO)	12
Dominic Peter (AUT)	2
Bi Shengfeng (CHN)	12
Denis Balaur (MDA)	2

Round of 16
Timofei Xenidis (GRE)	7
Aslan Kakhidze (KAZ)	14
Dato Marsagishvili (GEO)	13
Bi Shengfeng (CHN)	2

Quarterfinals
Aslan Kakhidze (KAZ)	10
Dato Marsagishvili (GEO)	9

==== Section 2 ====
Round of 64

Round of 32
Selim Yaşar (TUR)	2
Abdulrashid Sadulaev (RUS)	9
Michal Bodnár (SVK)	0
Dzhambuli Tsotadze (UKR)	10
Daniel Villanueva (MEX)	4
Ilfat Rajapov (UZB)	8
Musa Murtazaliev (ARM)	3
Mihail Ganev (BUL)	5

Round of 16
Abdulrashid Sadulaev (RUS)	11
Dzhambuli Tsotadze (UKR)	1
Ilfat Rajapov (UZB)	0
Mihail Ganev (BUL)	7^{F}

Quarterfinals
Abdulrashid Sadulaev (RUS)	11
Mihail Ganev (BUL)	0

=== Bottom half ===
==== Section 3 ====
Round of 64

Round of 32
Jaime Espinal (PUR)	8
Tudor Zuz (ITA)	0
Alex Dolly (IRL)	0
Gamzat Osmanov (AZE)	6
Amarhajy Mahamedau (BLR)	2
István Veréb (HUN)	6^{F}
Lee Dong-wook (KOR)	4
Gheorghiță Ștefan (ROU)	8

Round of 16
Jaime Espinal (PUR)	3
Gamzat Osmanov (AZE)	4
István Veréb (HUN)	0
Gheorghiță Ștefan (ROU)	2

Quarterfinals
Gamzat Osmanov (AZE)	10
Gheorghiță Ștefan (ROU)	0

==== Section 4 ====
Round of 64
Armando Hietbrink (RSA)	2
Reineris Salas (CUB)	12
Quintino Intipe (GBS)	1
Naresh Kumar (IND)	2^{F}
Mohamed Zaghloul (EGY)	7
Pedro Ceballos (VEN)	14
Nathaniel Tuamoheloa (ASA)
Zbigniew Baranowski (POL)	WO
Ýusup Melejaýew (TKM)	2
Ed Ruth (USA)	12
Mohammad Hossein Mohammadian (IRI)	10
Adrian Jaoude (BRA)	0

Round of 32
Tamerlan Tagziev (CAN)	4
Shinya Matsumoto (JPN)	5
Reineris Salas (CUB)	10
Naresh Kumar (IND)	3
Pedro Ceballos (VEN)	5
Zbigniew Baranowski (POL)	1
Ed Ruth (USA)	4
Mohammad Hossein Mohammadian (IRI)	7

Round of 16
Shinya Matsumoto (JPN)	3
Reineris Salas (CUB)	6
Pedro Ceballos (VEN)	6
Mohammad Hossein Mohammadian (IRI)	8

Quarterfinals
Reineris Salas (CUB)	4
Mohammad Hossein Mohammadian (IRI)	2

=== Repechage ===
Repechage round 1
Armando Hietbrink (RSA)	0
Naresh Kumar (IND)	10

Repechage round 2
Selim Yaşar (TUR)	6
Dzhambuli Tsotadze (UKR)	0
Naresh Kumar (IND)	0
Shinya Matsumoto (JPN)	5

Repechage round 3
Selim Yaşar (TUR)	11
Mihail Ganev (BUL)	1
Shinya Matsumoto (JPN)	0
Mohammad Hossein Mohammadian (IRI)	10

Bronze medals
Selim Yaşar (TUR)	5
Aslan Kakhidze (KAZ)	2
Mohammad Hossein Mohammadian (IRI)	11
Gamzat Osmanov (AZE)	2
