= Ed Ruth =

American collegiate wrestler and mixed martial artist (born 1990)

Edward Lee Ruth
- Born: October 21, 1990 (age 36); Harrisburg, Pennsylvania, U.S.
- Other names: Easy
- Height: 5 ft 11 in (1.80 m)
- Weight: 170 lb (77 kg; 12 st)
- Division: Welterweight (170) (2018–present); Middleweight (185) (2016–2018, 2020–present)
- Reach: 79 in (201 cm)
- Stance: Orthodox
- Fighting out of: San Jose, California, U.S.
- Team: Dethrone Mixed Martial Arts (2016–2018); Alliance MMA (2018–2019); American Kickboxing Academy (2019–present)
- Rank: Purple belt in Brazilian Jiu-Jitsu
- Wrestling: NCAA Division I Wrestling; Freestyle Wrestling
- Years active: 2016–2020

Mixed martial arts record
- Total: 11
- Wins: 8
- By knockout: 6
- By decision: 2
- Losses: 3
- By submission: 2
- By decision: 1

Other information
- Mixed martial arts record from Sherdog
Medal record
Men's collegiate wrestling
Representing the Penn State Nittany Lions
NCAA Division I Championships
Gold medal – first place	2012 St. Louis	174 lb
Gold medal – first place	2013 Des Moines	184 lb
Gold medal – first place	2014 Oklahoma City	184 lb
Bronze medal – third place	2011 Philadelphia	174 lb
Big Ten Championships
Gold medal – first place	2011 Evanston	174 lb
Gold medal – first place	2012 West Lafayette	174 lb
Gold medal – first place	2013 Illinois	184 lb
Gold medal – first place	2014 Madison	184 lb
Brazilian Jiu-Jitsu
Pan American Jiu-Jitsu Championships
Silver medal – second place	2017 Irvine	Heavyweight (207.5 lb)
Bronze medal – third place	2018 Irvine	Medium Heavyweight (194.5 lb)

Edward Lee Ruth (born October 21, 1990) is an American former professional mixed martial artist and freestyle and folkstyle wrestler. He competed in the Middleweight division of Bellator MMA. As a folkstyle wrestler, he was a three-time NCAA Division I national champion.

== Early life and education ==
Ruth was born in Harrisburg, Pennsylvania. He wrestled at Susquehanna Township High School prior to transferring to Blair Academy in Blairstown, New Jersey for his senior year, graduating in 2009.

== Wrestling ==
As a collegiate wrestler, Ruth competed for Pennsylvania State University from 2010 to 2014. While there, Ruth was a three-time NCAA Division I national champion.

In freestyle wrestling, Ruth represented the United States at the 2014 World Championships and the 2015 World Cup.

In July 2021, Ruth joined the University of Illinois wrestling program as an assistant coach.

== Mixed martial arts career ==
In December 2014, Ruth trained with mixed martial arts (MMA) fighter Jon Jones. While living in State College, Pennsylvania, Ruth trained at Central PA Mixed Martial Arts with head instructor Ryan Gruhn.

=== Bellator MMA ===
He signed with Bellator MMA in May 2015. Due to his focus on competing in the 2016 Summer Olympics, Ruth declared that it would "be a little while" before his MMA debut.

Ruth made his professional MMA debut in November 2016 on the undercard of Bellator 163 against Dustin Collins-Miles, fighting in the middleweight division. He won the fight via TKO in the first round.'

In his second professional MMA bout, Ruth faced Emanuele Palombi at Bellator 168 on December 10, 2016. He again won via TKO in the first round.

Ruth was expected to face Aaron Goodwine at Bellator 178 on April 21, 2017 but the bout did not materialize. Ruth instead fought and defeated David Mundell.

Ruth faced UFC veteran Chris Dempsey on November 3, 2017 at Bellator 186. He won the fight via knockout in the second round.

Ruth was originally scheduled to make his welterweight debut and face Lazslo Furko of Hungary, but Furko pulled out due to injury. Ruth then faced Ion Pascu of Romania, who took the fight on two weeks notice at Bellator 196 held in Budapest, Hungary. This fight was agreed at a catchweight of 175 lbs. He won the fight by unanimous decision after taking Pascu down numerous times and landing heavy ground and pound.

Ruth made his welterweight debut against Andy Murad at Bellator 201 in Temecula, California. He won the fight by TKO in round two.

Ruth next entered the Bellator Welterweight Grand Prix. He faced Neiman Gracie in the quarterfinals at Bellator 213 on December 15, 2018. He lost the fight via rear-naked choke submission in the fourth round. After the loss, Ruth decided to leave Alliance MMA and join American Kickboxing Academy.

Ruth faced Kiichi Kunimoto at Bellator 224 on July 12, 2019 and won the fight via TKO in the second round.

On August 15, 2019, it was announced that Ruth had signed an exclusive multi-fight, multi-year contract extension with Bellator. As the first fight of his new contract, Ruth faced Jason Jackson at Bellator 231 on October 25, 2019. He won the back-and-forth fight by split decision. 4 out of 6 media scores gave it to Jackson.

Ruth faced Yaroslav Amosov in the main event of Bellator 239, on February 21, 2020. He lost the fight via unanimous decision.

Ruth faced Taylor Johnson at Bellator 245 on September 11, 2020. He lost the bout due to an inverted heel hook submission early in the first round.

In July 2021, Ruth retired from MMA and took a job as assistant coach with the University of Illinois wrestling program, joining head coach Mike Poeta in his first year at the helm of the program.

== Championships and accomplishments ==
=== Freestyle wrestling ===
- United World Wrestling
  - 2015 Henri Deglane Challenge Silver Medalist
  - 2015 Bill Farrell International Open Gold Medalist
  - 2014 Heydar Aliyev Memorial Golden Grand Prix Bronze Medalist
- USA Wrestling
  - 2015 U.S World Team Trials Silver Medalist
  - 2015 U.S ASICS National Championships Bronze Medalist
  - 2014 U.S World Team Member
  - 2014 U.S Open Bronze Medalist
  - 2013 U.S University National Championships Gold Medalist

=== Folkstyle wrestling ===
- National Collegiate Athletic Association
  - NCAA Division I All-American out of Pennsylvania State University (2011, 2012, 2013, 2014)
  - NCAA Division I 174 lb Third Place out of Pennsylvania State University (2011)
  - NCAA Division I 174 lb National Champion out of Pennsylvania State University (2012)
  - NCAA Division I 184 lb National Champion out of Pennsylvania State University (2013)
  - NCAA Division I 184 lb National Champion out of Pennsylvania State University (2014)
- Big Ten Conference
  - Big Ten 174 lb Champion out of Pennsylvania State University (2011)
  - Big Ten 174 lb Champion out of Pennsylvania State University (2012)
  - Big Ten 184 lb Champion out of Pennsylvania State University (2013)
  - Big Ten 184 lb Champion out of Pennsylvania State University (2014)

== Mixed martial arts record ==
Professional record breakdown
11 matches	8 wins	3 losses
By knockout	6	0
By submission	0	2
By decision	2	1

Res.	Record	Opponent	Method	Event	Date	Round	Time	Location	Notes
Loss	8–3	Taylor Johnson	Submission (inverted heel hook)	Bellator 245	September 11, 2020	1	0:59	Uncasville, Connecticut, United States	Return to Middleweight.
Loss	8–2	Yaroslav Amosov	Decision (unanimous)	Bellator 239	February 21, 2020	3	5:00	Thackerville, Oklahoma, United States	
Win	8–1	Jason Jackson	Decision (split)	Bellator 231	October 25, 2019	3	5:00	Uncasville, Connecticut, United States	
Win	7–1	Kiichi Kunimoto	TKO (punches)	Bellator 224	July 12, 2019	2	3:49	Thackerville, Oklahoma, United States	
Loss	6–1	Neiman Gracie	Submission (rear-naked choke)	Bellator 213	December 15, 2018	4	2:17	Honolulu, Hawaii, United States	Bellator Welterweight World Grand Prix Quarterfinal.
Win	6–0	Andy Murad	TKO (punches)	Bellator 201	June 29, 2018	2	4:59	Temecula, California, United States	Welterweight debut.
Win	5–0	Ion Pascu	Decision (unanimous)	Bellator 196	April 6, 2018	3	5:00	Budapest, Hungary	Catchweight (175 lb) bout.
Win	4–0	Chris Dempsey	KO (punch)	Bellator 186	November 3, 2017	2	0:27	University Park, Pennsylvania, United States	
Win	3–0	David Mundell	TKO (knee to the body)	Bellator 178	April 21, 2017	2	3:13	Uncasville, Connecticut, United States	
Win	2–0	Emanuele Palombi	TKO (punches)	Bellator 168	December 10, 2016	1	1:33	Florence, Italy	Catchweight (189 lb) bout.
Win	1–0	Dustin Collins-Miles	TKO (punches)	Bellator 163	November 4, 2016	1	3:19	Uncasville, Connecticut, United States	Catchweight (192 lb) bout.

== NCAA record ==
NCAA Championships Matches
Res.	Record	Opponent	Score	Date	Event
2014 NCAA Championships (gold) at 184 lbs
Win	20-1	Jimmy Sheptock	7-2	March 20–22, 2014	2014 NCAA Division I Wrestling Championships
Win	19-1	Gabe Dean	5-3	March 20–22, 2014	2014 NCAA Division I Wrestling Championships
Win	18-1	Kevin Steinhaus	MD 10-2	March 20–22, 2014	2014 NCAA Division I Wrestling Championships
Win	17-1	Lazarus Reyes	TF 15-0	March 20–22, 2014	2014 NCAA Division I Wrestling Championships
Win	16-1	Jackson Hein	Fall	March 20–22, 2014	2014 NCAA Division I Wrestling Championships
2013 NCAA Championships (gold) at 184 lbs
Win	15-1	Robert Hamlin	MD 12-4	March 21–23, 2013	2013 NCAA Division I Wrestling Championships
Win	14-1	Steve Bosak	4-1	March 21–23, 2013	2013 NCAA Division I Wrestling Championships
Win	13-1	Josh Ihnen	MD 11-1	March 21–23, 2013	2013 NCAA Division I Wrestling Championships
Win	12-1	Kevin Radford	Fall	March 21–23, 2013	2013 NCAA Division I Wrestling Championships
Win	11-1	Fred Garcia	Fall	March 21–23, 2013	2013 NCAA Division I Wrestling Championships
2012 NCAA Championships (gold) at 174 lbs
Win	10-1	Nick Amuchastegui	MD 13-2	March 15–17, 2012	2012 NCAA Division I Wrestling Championships
Win	9-1	Logan Storley	TF 17-1	March 15–17, 2012	2012 NCAA Division I Wrestling Championships
Win	8-1	Nick Heflin	11-4	March 15–17, 2012	2012 NCAA Division I Wrestling Championships
Win	7-1	Dorian Henderson	Fall	March 15–17, 2012	2012 NCAA Division I Wrestling Championships
Win	6-1	Jim Resnick	Fall	March 15–17, 2012	2012 NCAA Division I Wrestling Championships
2011 NCAA Championships (bronze) at 174 lbs
Win	5-1	Chris Henrich	7-2	March 17–19, 2011	2011 NCAA Division I Wrestling Championships
Win	4-1	Ben Bennett	Fall	March 17–19, 2011	2011 NCAA Division I Wrestling Championships
Win	3-1	Luke Manuel	7-6	March 17–19, 2011	2011 NCAA Division I Wrestling Championships
Lose	2-1	Nick Amuchastegui	WDF	March 17–19, 2011	2011 NCAA Division I Wrestling Championships
Win	2-0	Scott Glasser	5-3	March 17–19, 2011	2011 NCAA Division I Wrestling Championships
Win	1-0	Royal Bettrager	Fall	March 17–19, 2011	2011 NCAA Division I Wrestling Championships

== Freestyle record ==
Res.	Record	Opponent	Score	Date	Event	Location
2015 US Nationals 8th at 86kg
Loss	42-14	(United States) Clayton Foster	8-15	December 18, 2015	2015 US Senior National Championships	(United States) Las Vegas, Nevada
Win	42-13	(United States) Ethen Lofthouse	TF 10-0	December 18, 2015	2015 US Senior National Championships	(United States) Las Vegas, Nevada
Loss	41-13	(United States) David Taylor	TF 0-13	December 18, 2015	2015 US Senior National Championships	(United States) Las Vegas, Nevada
Win	41-12	(United States) Anthony Jones	Fall	December 18, 2015	2015 US Senior National Championships	(United States) Las Vegas, Nevada
Win	40-12	(United States) Frank Richmond	TF 11-0	December 18, 2015	2015 US Senior National Championships	(United States) Las Vegas, Nevada
2015 Henri Deglane (silver) at 86kg
Loss	39-12	(Romania) Gheorghiță Ștefan	TF 0-10	November 27, 2015	2015 Henri Deglane Challenge	Nice, France
Win	39-11	(Iran) Armin Rezazadehbabaei	TF 10-0	November 27, 2015	2015 Henri Deglane Challenge	Nice, France
Win	38-11	(Georgia (country)) Giorgi Tigishvili	9-1	November 27, 2015	2015 Henri Deglane Challenge	Nice, France
2015 Bill Farrell (gold) at 86kg
Win	37-11	(United States) Jon Reader	TF 13-0	November 7, 2015	2015 Bill Farrell International Open	(United States) New York City, New York
Win	36-11	(United States) Richard Perry	5-4	November 7, 2015	2015 Bill Farrell International Open	(United States) New York City, New York
Win	35-11	(United States) Robert Hamlin	TF 14-3	November 7, 2015	2015 Bill Farrell International Open	(United States) New York City, New York
Win	34-11	(United States) Timmy McCall	TF 12-2	November 7, 2015	2015 Bill Farrell International Open	(United States) New York City, New York
2015 World Cup at 86kg
Loss	33-11	(Russia) Dauren Kurugliev	Fall	July 24, 2015	2015 Wrestling World Cup	Baku, Azerbaijan
Win	33-10	(Cuba) Reineris Salas	22-13	July 24, 2015	2015 Wrestling World Cup	Baku, Azerbaijan
2015 US World Team Trials (silver) at 86 kg
Loss	32-10	(United States) Jake Herbert	2-10	July 13, 2015	2015 US World Team Trials	(United States) Madison, Wisconsin
Loss	32-9	(United States) Jake Herbert	TF 3-13	July 13, 2015	2015 US World Team Trials	(United States) Madison, Wisconsin
Win	32-8	(United States) Keith Gavin	TF 12-2	July 13, 2015	2015 US World Team Trials Challenge Tournament	(United States) Madison, Wisconsin
Win	31-8	(United States) Jon Reader	24-18	July 13, 2015	2015 US World Team Trials Challenge Tournament	(United States) Madison, Wisconsin
Win	30-8	(United States) Phillip Keddy	TF 14-3	July 13, 2015	2015 US World Team Trials Challenge Tournament	(United States) Madison, Wisconsin
2015 ASICS US Nationals (bronze) at 86kg
Win	29-8	(United States) Deron Winn	TF 12-2	May 7, 2015	2015 Las Vegas/ASICS US Senior National Championships	(United States) Las Vegas, Nevada
Win	28-8	(United States) Jon Reader	TF 10-0	May 7, 2015	2015 Las Vegas/ASICS US Senior National Championships	(United States) Las Vegas, Nevada
Loss	27-8	(United States) Jake Herbert	11-13	May 7, 2015	2015 Las Vegas/ASICS US Senior National Championships	(United States) Las Vegas, Nevada
Win	27-7	(United States) Ryan Loder	TF 10-0	May 7, 2015	2015 Las Vegas/ASICS US Senior National Championships	(United States) Las Vegas, Nevada
Win	26-7	(United States) Austin Morehead	TF 13-2	May 7, 2015	2015 Las Vegas/ASICS US Senior National Championships	(United States) Las Vegas, Nevada
Win	25-7	(United States) Adam Fierro	TF 10-0	May 7, 2015	2015 Las Vegas/ASICS US Senior National Championships	(United States) Las Vegas, Nevada
2014 World Championship 15th at 86kg
Loss	24-7	(Iran) Mohammad Hossein Mohammadian	4-7	September 8, 2014	2014 World Wrestling Championships	Tashkent, Uzbekistan
Win	24-6	(Turkmenistan) Yusup Melejayev	TF 12-2	September 8, 2014	2014 World Wrestling Championships	Tashkent, Uzbekistan
2014 Heydar Aliyev Memorial (bronze) at 86kg
Win	23-6	(Spain) Taimuraz Friev	5-0	July 24, 2014	2014 Heydar Aliyev Memorial Golden Grand Prix	Baku, Azerbaijan
Loss	22-6	(Russia) Shamil Kudiyamagomedov	2-3	July 24, 2014	2014 Heydar Aliyev Memorial Golden Grand Prix	Baku, Azerbaijan
Win	22-5	(Azerbaijan) Magomiedgadży Chatijew	4-1	July 24, 2014	2014 Heydar Aliyev Memorial Golden Grand Prix	Baku, Azerbaijan
Win	21-5	(Latvia) Armands Zvirbulis	TF 18-4	July 24, 2014	2014 Heydar Aliyev Memorial Golden Grand Prix	Baku, Azerbaijan
2014 US World Team Trials (gold) at 86 kg
Win	20-5	(United States) Keith Gavin	11-7	June 1, 2014	2014 US World Team Trials	(United States) Madison, Wisconsin
Win	19-5	(United States) Keith Gavin	Fall	June 1, 2014	2014 US World Team Trials	(United States) Madison, Wisconsin
Loss	18-5	(United States) Keith Gavin	5-7	June 1, 2014	2014 US World Team Trials	(United States) Madison, Wisconsin
Win	18-4	(United States) Clayton Foster	7-3	June 1, 2014	2014 US World Team Trials Challenge Tournament	(United States) Madison, Wisconsin
Win	17-4	(United States) Phillip Keddy	TF 14-4	June 1, 2014	2014 US World Team Trials Challenge Tournament	(United States) Madison, Wisconsin
Win	16-4	(United States) Robert Hamlin	TF 13-3	June 1, 2014	2014 US World Team Trials Challenge Tournament	(United States) Madison, Wisconsin
2014 US Open (bronze) at 86kg
Win	15-4	(United States) Jon Reader	12-11	April 18, 2014	2014 U.S Open Wrestling Championships	(United States) Las Vegas, Nevada
Win	14-4	(United States) Robert Hamlin	6-2	April 18, 2014	2014 U.S Open Wrestling Championships	(United States) Las Vegas, Nevada
Loss	13-4	(United States) Clayton Foster	13-14	April 18, 2014	2014 U.S Open Wrestling Championships	(United States) Las Vegas, Nevada
Win	13-3	(United States) Phillip Keddy	14-10	April 18, 2014	2014 U.S Open Wrestling Championships	(United States) Las Vegas, Nevada
Win	12-3	(United States) Richard Perry	TF 11-1	April 18, 2014	2014 U.S Open Wrestling Championships	(United States) Las Vegas, Nevada
Win	11-3	(United States) Kane Hobbs	TF 10-0	April 18, 2014	2014 U.S Open Wrestling Championships	(United States) Las Vegas, Nevada
2013 Universiade Games 23rd at 86kg
Loss	10-3	(Iran) Mohammad Hossein Mohammadian	TF 0-10	July 11, 2013	2013 Summer Universiade	Tashkent, Uzbekistan
2013 University Nationals (gold) at 86kg
Win	10-2	(United States) Cameron Simaz	TF 10-0	May 25, 2013	2013 US University National Championships	(United States) Akron, Ohio
Win	9-2	(United States) Cameron Simaz	6-4	May 25, 2013	2013 US University National Championships	(United States) Akron, Ohio
Win	8-2	(United States) Max Thomusseit	9-8	May 25, 2013	2013 US University National Championships	(United States) Akron, Ohio
Win	7-2	(United States) Kenneth Courts	14-9	May 25, 2013	2013 US University National Championships	(United States) Akron, Ohio
Win	6-2	(United States) Michael Dessino	TF 10-0	May 25, 2013	2013 US University National Championships	(United States) Akron, Ohio
Win	5-2	(United States) David Chenevey	TF 10-0	May 25, 2013	2013 US University National Championships	(United States) Akron, Ohio
Win	4-2	(United States) Nolan Boyd	TF 17-7	May 25, 2013	2013 US University National Championships	(United States) Akron, Ohio
2013 US Open 4th at 86kg
Loss	3-2	(United States) Jon Reader	7-3	April 18, 2013	2013 US Open Wrestling Championships	(United States) Las Vegas, Nevada
Win	3-1	(United States) Austin Trotman	7-3	April 18, 2013	2013 US Open Wrestling Championships	(United States) Las Vegas, Nevada
Loss	2-1	(United States) Clayton Foster	1-7	April 18, 2013	2013 US Open Wrestling Championships	(United States) Las Vegas, Nevada
Win	2-0	(United States) Enock Francois	5-0	April 18, 2013	2013 US Open Wrestling Championships	(United States) Las Vegas, Nevada
Win	1-0	(United States) Daniel Bedoy	10-4	April 18, 2013	2013 US Open Wrestling Championships	(United States) Las Vegas, Nevada

== Submission grappling record ==
12 Matches, 9 Wins (4 Submissions), 3 Losses (1 Submission)
Result	Rec.	Opponent	Method	Event	Division	Type	Year	Location
Loss	9–3	(Australia) Louis Edward Kelly Ryan	Points (7-8)	2019 IBJJF World No-Gi Championships	91.5 kg	Nogi	December 14, 2019	(United States) Anaheim, CA
Win	9–2	(Brazil) Christopher Diaz Jr	Points (2-0)	2019 IBJJF World No-Gi Championships	91.5 kg	Nogi	December 14, 2019	(United States) Anaheim, CA
Win	8–2	(United States) Vincent M. Valenzuela	Submission (anaconda choke)	2019 IBJJF World No-Gi Championships	91.5 kg	Nogi	December 14, 2019	(United States) Anaheim, CA
Loss	7–2	(Brazil) Mateus Rodrigues	Submission (armbar)	2018 IBJJF Pan American Jiu-jitsu Championships	74 kg	Gi (blue)	March 11, 2018	(United States) Irvine, CA
Win	7–1	(Brazil) Felipe Porto Shiavon	Submission (arm-triangle choke)	2018 IBJJF Pan American Jiu-jitsu Championships	74 kg	Gi (blue)	March 11, 2018	(United States) Irvine, CA
Win	6–1	(United States) Logan Ross	Points (6-0)	2018 IBJJF Pan American Jiu-jitsu Championships	74 kg	Gi (blue)	March 11, 2018	(United States) Irvine, CA
Win	5–1	(United States) Derek Young	Points (14-0)	2018 IBJJF Pan American Jiu-jitsu Championships	74 kg	Gi (blue)	March 11, 2018	(United States) Irvine, CA
Loss	4–1	(United States) Conner DeAngelis	Points (0-2)	2017 IBJJF Pan American Jiu-jitsu Championships	94 kg	Gi (blue)	March 16, 2017	(United States) Irvine, CA
Win	4–0	(United States) Alex Sterner	Points (16-0)	2017 IBJJF Pan American Jiu-jitsu Championships	94 kg	Gi (blue)	March 16, 2017	(United States) Irvine, CA
Win	3–0	(United States) Jerome Harris Jr	Points (13-0)	2017 IBJJF Pan American Jiu-jitsu Championships	94 kg	Gi (blue)	March 16, 2017	(United States) Irvine, CA
Win	2–0	(United States) Kevin Fusiler	Submission (kimura)	2017 IBJJF Pan American Jiu-jitsu Championships	94 kg	Gi (blue)	March 16, 2017	(United States) Irvine, CA
Win	1–0	(United States) Kristien Ruffin	Submission (armbar)	2017 IBJJF Pan American Jiu-jitsu Championships	94 kg	Gi (blue)	March 16, 2017	(United States) Irvine, CA
