= 2015 Wrestling World Cup – Men's freestyle =

Men's freestyle at the 2015 Wrestling World Cup
- Location: Los Angeles, United States
- Dates: 11–12 April

Medalists
gold medal	Iran
silver medal	United States
bronze medal	Azerbaijan

The 2015 Wrestling World Cup – Men's freestyle was The last of a set of three Wrestling World Cups in 2015 .

== Pool stage ==
Team competes for 1st place
Team competes for 3rd place
Team competes for 5th place
Team competes for 7th place

=== Pool A ===
Team	Pld	W	L
Iran	3	3	0
Azerbaijan	3	2	1
Belarus	3	1	2
Turkey	3	0	3

POOL A
Round I

Iran 8 - Belarus 0
Weight	Iran	result	Belarus
57 kg	Hassan Rahimi	5 – 2	Vladislav Andreev
61 kg	Behnam Ehsanpour	7 – 0	Dzianis Maksimov
65 kg	Ahmad Mohammadi	11 – 0	Azamat Nurykau
70 kg	Hassan Yazdani	12 – 1	Zhan Safian
74 kg	Morteza Rezaei Ghaleh	4 – 4	Ali Shabanau
86 kg	Alireza Karimi	7 – 4	Amarhajy Mahamedav
97 kg	Reza Yazdani	10 – 0	Ivan Yankouski
125 kg	Parviz Hadi	6 – 0	Aleksey Shemarov

Azerbaijan 7 - Turkey 1
Weight	Azerbaijan	result	Turkey
57 kg	Yashar Aliyev	9 – 4	Sezar Akgül
61 kg	Haji Aliyev	17 – 4	Münir Recep Aktaş
65 kg	Toghrul Asgarov	11 – 0	Safa Aksoy
70 kg	Ruslan Dibirgadjiyev	–	by forfeit
74 kg	Jabrayil Hasanov	6 – 3	Soner Demirtaş
86 kg	Aleksander Gostiev	4 – 2	Serdar Böke
97 kg	Sharif Sharifov	2 – 0	İbrahim Bölükbaşı
125 kg	Jamaladdin Magomedov	8 – 4^{F}	Tanju Gemici

Round II

Iran 7 - Turkey 1
Weight	Iran	result	Turkey
57 kg	Younes Sarmasti	10 – 13	Sezar Akgül
61 kg	Behnam Ehsanpour	5 – 0	Münir Recep Aktaş
65 kg	Masoud Esmaeilpour	10 – 0	Safa Aksoy
70 kg	Hassan Yazdani	–	by forfeit
74 kg	Peyman Yarahmadi	–	by forfeit
86 kg	Meisam Mostafa-Jokar	10 – 0	Serdar Böke
97 kg	Mohammad Hossein Mohammadian	4 – 4	İbrahim Bölükbaşı
125 kg	Komeil Ghasemi	4^{F} – 0	Tanju Gemici

Belarus 2 - Azerbaijan 6
Weight	Belarus	result	Azerbaijan
57 kg	Vladislav Andreev	2 – 12	Jalal Suleymanov
61 kg	Dzianis Maksimov	2 – 12	Haji Aliyev
65 kg	Azamat Nurykau	2 – 6	Toghrul Asgarov
70 kg	Zhan Safian	0 – 8	Ruslan Dibirgadjiyev
74 kg	Ali Shabanau	1 – 1	Jabrayil Hasanov
86 kg	Amarhajy Mahamedav	1 – 1	Aleksander Gostiev
97 kg	Ivan Yankouski	1 – 11	Sharif Sharifov
125 kg	Aleksey Shemarov	5 – 3	Jamaladdin Magomedov

Round III

Belarus 5 - Turkey 3
Weight	Belarus	result	Turkey
57 kg	'Vladislav Andreev	5 – 3	Sezar Akgül
61 kg	Dzianis Maksimov	4 – 14	Münir Recep Aktaş
65 kg	Azamat Nurykau	11 – 0	Mustafa Kartal
70 kg	Zhan Safian	–	by forfeit
74 kg	Ali Shabanau	3 – 4	Soner Demirtaş
86 kg	Serdar Böke	7 – 8	Aleksander Gostiev
97 kg	Ivan Yankouski	20 – 9	İbrahim Bölükbaşı
125 kg	Aleksey Shemarov	10 – 0	Tanju Gemici

Iran 7- Azerbaijan 1
Weight	Iran	result	Azerbaijan
57 kg	Hassan Rahimi	8 – 2	Jalal Suleymanov
61 kg	Behnam Ehsanpour	5 – 5	Haji Aliyev
65 kg	Ahmad Mohammadi	14 – 10	Toghrul Asgarov
70 kg	Hassan Yazdani	10 – 8	Ruslan Dibirgadjiyev
74 kg	Morteza Rezaei Ghaleh	12 – 2	Jabrayil Hasanov
86 kg	Meisam Mostafa-Jokar	12 – 1	Aleksander Gostiev
97 kg	Reza Yazdani	1 – 9	Sharif Sharifov
125 kg	Parviz Hadi	12 – 2	Jamaladdin Magomedov

=== Pool B ===
Team	Pld	W	L
United States	3	3	0
Russia	3	2	1
Mongolia	3	1	2
Cuba	3	0	3

POOL B
Round I

United States 6 - Cuba 2
Weight	United States	result	Cuba
57 kg	Tony Ramos	2 – 4^{F}	Yowlys Bonne
61 kg	Coleman Scott	1 – 8	Maikel Pérez
65 kg	Brent Metcalf	7 – 2	Franklin Marén
70 kg	Nick Marable	10 – 0	Andy Morena González
74 kg	Jordan Burroughs	6 – 2	Liván López
86 kg	Ed Ruth	22 – 13	Reineris Salas
97 kg	Jake Varner	3 – 0	Javier Cortina
125 kg	Zach Rey	3 – 0	Eduardo Mesa Rabi

Russia 5 - Mongolia 3
Weight	Russia	result	Mongolia
57 kg	Omak Syuryun	8 – 1	Tsogtbaatar Damdinbazar
61 kg	Egor Ponomarev	3 – 1	Nemekhbayar Batsaikhan
65 kg	Zaurbek Sidakov	4 – 6	Ganzorigiin Mandakhnaran
70 kg	Israil Kasumov	8^{F} – 10	Ankhbayar Batchuluun
74 kg	Isa Daudov	6 – 6	Pürevjavyn Önörbat
86 kg	Dauren Kurugliev	10 – 0	Usukhbaatar Purevee
97 kg	Yuri Belonovski	2 – 0	Khuderbulga Dorjkhand
125 kg	Timur Kotsoev	1 – 8	Chuluunbat Jargalsaikhan

Round II

United States 4 df. - Russia 4
Weight	United States	result	Russia
57 kg	'Tony Ramos	4 – 2	Omak Syuryun
61 kg	Coleman Scott	1 – 10	Murshid Mutalimov
65 kg	Brent Metcalf	13 – 3	Akhmed Chakaev
70 kg	Nick Marable	4 – 6	Israil Kasumov
74 kg	Jordan Burroughs	12 – 0	Iakub Shikhdzamalov
86 kg	Ed Ruth	0 – 5^{F}	Dauren Kurugliev
97 kg	Jake Varner	0 – 4	Yuri Belonovski
125 kg	Tervel Dlagnev	10 – 0	Timur Kotsoev

Mongolia 5 - Cuba 3
Weight	Mongolia	result	Cuba
57 kg	Tsogtbaatar Damdinbazar	5 – 15	Yowlys Bonne
61 kg	Nemekhbayar Batsaikhan	9 – 5	Maikel Pérez
65 kg	Ganzorigiin Mandakhnaran	11 – 0	Franklin Marén
70 kg	Ankhbayar Batchuluun	11 – 0	Andy Morena González
74 kg	Pürevjavyn Önörbat	4 – 6	Liván López
86 kg	Usukhbaatar Purevee	–	by forfeit
97 kg	Khuderbulga Dorjkhand	1 – 3	Javier Cortina
125 kg	Chuluunbat Jargalsaikhan	10 – 0	Eduardo Mesa Rabi

Round III

United States 8 - Mongolia 0
Weight	United States	result	Mongolia
57 kg	'Tony Ramos	1 – 1	Tsogtbaatar Damdinbazar
61 kg	Coleman Scott	8 – 5	Nemekhbayar Batsaikhan
65 kg	Brent Metcalf	8 – 2	Ganzorigiin Mandakhnaran
70 kg	Nick Marable	4 – 1	Ankhbayar Batchuluun
74 kg	Jordan Burroughs	6 – 0	Pürevjavyn Önörbat
86 kg	Clayton Foster	2 – 2	Usukhbaatar Purevee
97 kg	Jake Varner	3 – 0	Khuderbulga Dorjkhand
125 kg	Tervel Dlagnev	10 – 0	Chuluunbat Jargalsaikhan

Cuba4 - Russia 4.df
Weight	Cuba	result	Russia
57 kg	Yowlys Bonne	12 – 6	Viktor Rassadin
61 kg	by forfeit	–	Murshid Mutalimov
65 kg	Franklin Marén	4 – 3	Zaurbek Sidakov
70 kg	Andy Morena González	2 – 2	Israil Kasumov
74 kg	Liván López	7 – 2	Isa Daudov
86 kg	Reineris Salas	R –	Akhmed Magomedov
97 kg	Javier Cortina	8 – 2	Asret Shogenov
125 kg	Eduardo Mesa Rabi	2 – 5^{F}	Yuri Belonovski

== Medal Matches ==
Medal Matches
First-Place Match

Iran 5 - United States 3
Weight	Iran	result	United States
57 kg	Hassan Rahimi	6 – 5	Tony Ramos
61 kg	Behnam Ehsanpour	9 – 7	Coleman Scott
65 kg	Masoud Esmaeilpour	1 – 3	Brent Metcalf
70 kg	Hassan Yazdani	3 – 1	Nick Marable
74 kg	Morteza Rezaei Ghaleh	0 – 10	Jordan Burroughs
86 kg	Meisam Mostafa-Jokar	12 – 2	Clayton Foster
97 kg	Mohammad Hossein Mohammadian	3 – 3	Jake Varner
125 kg	Komeil Ghasemi	3 – 1	Zach Rey

Third-Place Match

Azerbaijan 4.df - Russia 4
Weight	Azerbaijan	result	Russia
57 kg	Yashar Aliyev	1 – 8	Viktor Rassadin
61 kg	Haji Aliyev	9 – 4	Murshid Mutalimov
65 kg	Magomed Muslimov	6 – 0	Zaurbek Sidakov
70 kg	Ruslan Dibirgadjiyev	4 – 6	Israil Kasumov
74 kg	Murad Suleymanov	1 – 4	Iakub Shikhdzamalov
86 kg	Aleksander Gostiev	0 – 4	Dauren Kurugliev
97 kg	Sharif Sharifov	1 – 1	Yuri Belonovski
125 kg	Jamaladdin Magomedov	12 – 1	Timur Kotsoev

Fifth-Place Match

Belarus 5 - Mongolia 3
Weight	Belarus	result	Mongolia
57 kg	Vladislav Andreev	3 – 6^{F}	Tsogtbaatar Damdinbazar
61 kg	Dzianis Maksimov	10 – 7	Nemekhbayar Batsaikhan
65 kg	Azamat Nurykau	5 – 5	Ganzorigiin Mandakhnaran
70 kg	Zhan Safian	9 – 11	Ankhbayar Batchuluun
74 kg	Ali Shabanau	8 – 2	Pürevjavyn Önörbat
86 kg	Amarhajy Mahamedav	8 – 5	Usukhbaatar Purevee
97 kg	Ivan Yankouski	7 – 2	Khuderbulga Dorjkhand
125 kg	Aleksey Shemarov	9 – 1	Chuluunbat Jargalsaikhan

Seventh-Place Match

Cuba 5 - Turkey 3
Weight	Cuba	result	Turkey
57 kg	Yowlys Bonne	10 – 0	Sezar Akgül
61 kg	by forfeit	–	Münir Recep Aktaş
65 kg	Franklin Marén	10 – 0	Mustafa Kartal
70 kg	Andy Morena González	4 – 2	Safa Aksoy
74 kg	Liván López	–	by forfeit
86 kg	by forfeit	–	Serdar Böke
97 kg	Javier Cortina	3^{F} – 0	İbrahim Bölükbaşı
125 kg	by forfeit	–	Tanju Gemici

== Final classement ==
Team	Pld	W	L
Iran	4	4	0
United States	4	3	1
Azerbaijan	4	3	1
Russia	4	2	2
Belarus	4	2	2
Mongolia	4	1	3
Cuba	4	1	3
Turkey	4	0	4

== See also ==
- 2015 Wrestling World Cup - Men's Greco-Roman
