= 2016 European Wrestling Championships – Men's freestyle 86 kg =

The men's freestyle 86 kg is a competition featured at the 2016 European Wrestling Championships, and was held in Riga, Latvia on March 8.

== Medalists ==
Gold	Shamil Kudiyamagomedov; Russia
Silver	Aleksander Gostiyev; Azerbaijan
Bronze	Dato Marsagishvili; Georgia
Bronze	Ibragim Aldatov; Ukraine

== Results ==
Legend

- R — Retired
- F — Won by fall

=== Final ===
Final
Shamil Kudiyamagomedov (RUS)	6
Aleksander Gostiyev (AZE)	2

=== Top half ===
==== Section 1 ====
Round of 32

Round of 16
Timofei Xenidis (GRE)	6
Ibragim Aldatov (UKR)	9
Ion Gurmuzachi (MDA)	1
Selim Yaşar (TUR)	6
Shamil Kudiyamagomedov (RUS)	11
Rene Matejov (SVK)	0
Shamir Atyan (ARM)	10
Marco Riesen (SUI)	0

Quarterfinals
Ibragim Aldatov (UKR)	2
Selim Yaşar (TUR)	2
Shamil Kudiyamagomedov (RUS)	10
Shamir Atyan (ARM)	0

Semifinals
Shamil Kudiyamagomedov (RUS)	11
Ibragim Aldatov (UKR)	0

=== Bottom half ===
Round of 32
Armands Zvirbulis (LAT)	3
Aliaksandr Hushtyn (BLR)	7
William Harth (GER)	10
Michael Tsotselashvili (ISR)	0
Miroslav Geshev (BUL)	6
Aron Caneva (ITA)	0

Round of 16
Dato Marsagishvili (GEO)	6
Gheorghiță Ștefan (ROU)	0
Zbigniew Baranowski (POL)	0^{R}
Aleksander Gostiyev (AZE)	0
István Veréb (HUN)	4
Aliaksandr Hushtyn (BLR)	4
William Harth (GER)	8
Miroslav Geshev (BUL)	0

Quarterfinals
Dato Marsagishvili (GEO)	3
Aleksander Gostiyev (AZE)	4
Aliaksandr Hushtyn (BLR)	7
William Harth (GER)	3

Semifinals
Aleksander Gostiyev (AZE)	3
Aliaksandr Hushtyn (BLR)	1

=== Repechage ===
Repechage round 2
Rene Matejov (SVK)	5
Shamir Atyan (ARM)	8
Zbigniew Baranowski (POL)	0^{R}
Dato Marsagishvili (GEO)	0

Bronze medals
Ibragim Aldatov (UKR)	10
Shamir Atyan (ARM)	2
Dato Marsagishvili (GEO)	5
Aliaksandr Hushtyn (BLR)	2
