= Wrestling at the 2020 Summer Olympics – Men's freestyle 97 kg =

Men's freestyle 97 kg at the Games of the XXXII Olympiad
- Venue: Makuhari Messe
- Date: 6–7 August 2021
- Competitors: 16 from 16 nations

Medalists
1st place, gold medalist(s)		Abdulrashid Sadulaev	ROC
2nd place, silver medalist(s)		Kyle Snyder	United States
3rd place, bronze medalist(s)		Reineris Salas	Cuba
3rd place, bronze medalist(s)		Abraham Conyedo	Italy

The men's freestyle 97 kilograms competition at the 2020 Summer Olympics in Tokyo, Japan, took place on 6–7 August 2021 at the Makuhari Messe in Mihama-ku.

This freestyle wrestling competition consists of a single-elimination tournament, with a repechage used to determine the winner of two bronze medals. The two finalists face off for gold and silver medals. Each wrestler who loses to one of the two finalists moves into the repechage, culminating in a pair of bronze medal matches featuring the semifinal losers each facing the remaining repechage opponent from their half of the bracket.

== Schedule ==
All times are Japan Standard Time (UTC+9:00)

Date	Time	Event
6 August 2021	11:00	Qualification rounds
6 August 2021	18:15	Semifinals
7 August 2021	18:45	Repechage
7 August 2021	19:30	Finals

== Results ==
Legend

- WO — Won by walkover

=== Main bracket ===
1/8 finals
Abdulrashid Sadulaev (ROC)	5
Sharif Sharifov (AZE)	0
Mohammad Hossein Mohammadian (IRI)	3
Elizbar Odikadze (GEO)	6
Aliaksandr Hushtyn (BLR)	3
Reineris Salas (CUB)	4
Mohamed Saadaoui (TUN)	0
Magomedgaji Nurov (MKD)	5
Alisher Yergali (KAZ)	WO
Mohammed Fardj (ALG)
Magomed Ibragimov (UZB)	3
Süleyman Karadeniz (TUR)	3
Abraham Conyedo (ITA)	6
Albert Saritov (ROU)	1
Jordan Steen (CAN)	2
Kyle Snyder (USA)	12

1/4 finals
Abdulrashid Sadulaev (ROC)	10
Elizbar Odikadze (GEO)	0
Reineris Salas (CUB)	6
Magomedgaji Nurov (MKD)	4
Alisher Yergali (KAZ)	7
Süleyman Karadeniz (TUR)	8
Abraham Conyedo (ITA)	0
Kyle Snyder (USA)	6

Semifinals
Abdulrashid Sadulaev (ROC)	4
Reineris Salas (CUB)	0
Süleyman Karadeniz (TUR)	0
Kyle Snyder (USA)	5

Final
Abdulrashid Sadulaev (ROC)	6
Kyle Snyder (USA)	3

=== Repechage ===
Repechage
Sharif Sharifov (AZE)	7
Elizbar Odikadze (GEO)	5
Jordan Steen (CAN)	2
Abraham Conyedo (ITA)	4

Bronze medal matches
Sharif Sharifov (AZE)	3
Reineris Salas (CUB)	3
Abraham Conyedo (ITA)	6
Süleyman Karadeniz (TUR)	2

== Final standing ==
Rank	Athlete
1st place, gold medalist(s)	Abdulrashid Sadulaev (ROC)
2nd place, silver medalist(s)	Kyle Snyder (USA)
3rd place, bronze medalist(s)	Reineris Salas (CUB)
3rd place, bronze medalist(s)	Abraham Conyedo (ITA)
5	Sharif Sharifov (AZE)
5	Süleyman Karadeniz (TUR)
7	Alisher Yergali (KAZ)
8	Elizbar Odikadze (GEO)
9	Magomedgaji Nurov (MKD)
10	Jordan Steen (CAN)
11	Magomed Ibragimov (UZB)
12	Aliaksandr Hushtyn (BLR)
13	Mohammad Hossein Mohammadian (IRI)
14	Albert Saritov (ROU)
15	Mohamed Saadaoui (TUN)
—	Mohammed Fardj (ALG)
