= Ali Shabani =

Iranian freestyle wrestler

Personal information
- Native name: علی شعبانی
- Full name: Ali Shabanibengar
- Born: علی شعبانی بنگر; 18 May 1995 (age 31) Babol, Mazandaran Province, Iran
- Height: 182 cm ( 5 ft 11.5 in )
- Weight: 97 kg (214 lb)
- Spouse: Zahra Yazdani Cherati
- Website: Official Instagram Profile

Sport
- Country: Iran
- Sport: Amateur wrestling
- Event: Freestyle
- Coached by: Gholamreza Mohammadi
Medal record
Men's freestyle wrestling
Representing Iran
Asian Championships
Gold medal – first place	2021 Almaty	97 kg
U23 World Championships
Bronze medal – third place	2018 Bucharest	97 kg

Ali Shabanibengar (Persian: علی شعبانی بنگر, born 18 May 1995) is an Iranian freestyle wrestler who competes at 97 kilograms. Shabani has claimed the 2021 Asian Continental Championship as well as a bronze medal from the 2018 U23 World Championships. He was also the World Championship representative for Iran in 2019 and is a two–time IRI World Team Member.

== Career ==
=== 2018–2019 ===
After winning the U23 Iranian World Team Trials, Shabani made his international debut at the 2018 U23 World Championships, where he claimed a bronze medal. In 2019, he competed at the World Championships (Reza Yazdani, who had beaten Shabani was forced to pull out of the event, and as Shabani had been the '19 IRI World Team Trials runner–up, he was a replacement), helped his homeland place first at the Clubs World Cup and also claimed silver from the Yasar Dogu.

=== 2020–2021 ===
After the COVID-19 outbreak slowed down, Shabani competed at the Iranian World Team Trials in November 2020, in an attempt to qualify for the Individual World Cup. After notably defeating Mojtaba Goleij, he went on to violently upset the dominant Mohammad Hossein Mohammadian twice in a row to claim the spot, although he ended up not being sent to the Individual World Cup.

To start off 2021, Shabani claimed the Asian Continental Championship. Days before, Mohammadian qualified the weight for the 2020 Summer Olympics for Iran with a dominant run at the Asian Olympic Qualification Tournament. The Iranian Wrestling Federation decided that the Poland Open (which took place on June 8) would decide the country's representative at the Summer Olympics, contested between Shabani, Alireza Karimi and Mohammad Hossein Mohammadian. After wins over '19 World Championship medalist Magomedgadzhi Nurov and multiple–time Asian Championship medalist Alisher Yergali, he was defeated by Mohammad Hossein Mohammadian in a closely contested two–point final bout. This result determined Mohammadian as the representative for Iran at the 2020 Summer Olympics.

== Major results ==
Year	Competition	Venue	Position	Event	Notes
Representing Iran
2018	U23 World Championships	Bucharest, Romania	3rd	Freestyle 97 kg	
2021	Asian Championships	Almaty, Kazakhstan	1st	Freestyle 97 kg	

== Freestyle record ==
International Senior Freestyle Matches
Res.	Record	Opponent	Score	Date	Event	Location
2021 Poland Open (silver) at 97 kg
Loss	22–6	(Iran) Mohammad Hossein Mohammadian	1–1	June 8, 2021	2021 Poland Open	Warsaw, Poland
Win	22–5	(Kazakhstan) Alisher Yergali	7–2	June 8, 2021	2021 Poland Open	Warsaw, Poland
Win	21–5	(North Macedonia) Magomedgadzhi Nurov	9–2	June 8, 2021	2021 Poland Open	Warsaw, Poland
2021 Asian Championships (gold) at 97 kg
Win	20–5	(Kazakhstan) Alisher Yergali	TF 12–2	April 13–18, 2021	2021 Asian Continental Championships	Almaty, Kazakhstan
Win	19–5	(India) Satyawart Kadian	TF 10–0	April 13–18, 2021	2021 Asian Continental Championships	Almaty, Kazakhstan
Win	18–5	(South Korea) Minwon Seo	TF 11–0	April 13–18, 2021	2021 Asian Continental Championships	Almaty, Kazakhstan
2020 Iranian Premier Wrestling League 4th as Team Ghaemshahr at 97 kg
Win	17–5	(Iran) Hossein Shahbazi	5–0	December 17, 2020	2020 Iranian Premier Wrestling League	Tehran, Iran
Win	16–5	(Iran) Alireza Safar		December 17, 2020	2020 Iranian Premier Wrestling League	Tehran, Iran
2020 IRI World Team Trials (gold) at 97 kg
Win	15–5	(Iran) Mohammad Hossein Mohammadian	4–0	November 5, 2020	2020 Iranian World Team Trials	Tehran, Iran
Win	14–5	(Iran) Mohammad Hossein Mohammadian	8–4	November 5, 2020	2020 Iranian World Team Trials	Tehran, Iran
Win	13–5	(Iran) Danial Shariati	6–2	November 5, 2020	2020 Iranian World Team Trials	Tehran, Iran
Win	12–5	(Iran) Mojtaba Goleij	7–3	November 5, 2020	2020 Iranian World Team Trials	Tehran, Iran
2020 Takhti Cup (bronze) at 97 kg
Win	11–5	(Iran) Esmaeil Nejatian	FF	January 7–8, 2020	2020 Takhti Cup	Kermanshah, Iran
Loss	10–5	(Iran) Mojtaba Goleij	4–6	January 7–8, 2020	2020 Takhti Cup	Kermanshah, Iran
2019 World Clubs Cup (gold) as Team Bazar-e Bozorg at 97 kg
Win	10–4	(China) Rusidanmu Reheman	TF 11–0	December 19, 2019	2019 World Clubs Cup	Isfahan, Iran
2019 World Championships 10th at 97 kg
Loss	9–4	(Georgia (country)) Elizbar Odikadze	8–11	September 21, 2019	2019 World Championships	Nur-Sultan, Kazakhstan
Win	8–3	(Turkey) İbrahim Çiftçi	9–1	September 21, 2019	2019 World Championships	Nur-Sultan, Kazakhstan
2019 Yasar Dogu (silver) at 97 kg
Loss	7–3	(United States) Kyle Snyder	1–2	July 11, 2019	2019 Yasar Dogu International	Istanbul, Turkey
Win	7–2	(Azerbaijan) Aslanbek Alborov	TF 10–0	July 11, 2019	2019 Yasar Dogu International	Istanbul, Turkey
Win	6–2	(Turkey) Fatih Yaşarlı	TF 10–0	July 11, 2019	2019 Yasar Dogu International	Istanbul, Turkey
Win	5–2	(Italy) Abraham Conyedo	6–2	July 11, 2019	2019 Yasar Dogu International	Istanbul, Turkey
2019 IRI World Team Trials (silver) at 97 kg
Loss	4–2	(Iran) Reza Yazdani	1–2	July 1, 2019	2019 IRI World Team Trials	Mazandaran Province, Iran
Win	4–1	(Iran) Hamed Talebi Zarrinkamar	3–2	July 1, 2019	2019 IRI World Team Trials	Mazandaran Province, Iran
2018 U23 World Championships (bronze) at 97 kg
Win	3–1	(China) Chaoqiang Yang	TF 11–0	November 12–18, 2018	2018 U23 World Championships	Bucharest, Romania
Loss	2–1	(Georgia (country)) Givi Matcharashvili	TF 0–10	November 12–18, 2018	2018 U23 World Championships	Bucharest, Romania
Win	2–0	(Germany) Erik Thiele	8–0	November 12–18, 2018	2018 U23 World Championships	Bucharest, Romania
Win	1–0	(Italy) Simone Iannattoni	TF 11–0	November 12–18, 2018	2018 U23 World Championships	Bucharest, Romania
