= Andrew Dick (wrestler) =

Nigerian freestyle wrestler

Personal information
- Full name: Andrew Adibo Dick
- Nationality: Nigeria
- Born: 11 May 1976 (age 50) Abeokuta, Ogun, Nigeria
- Weight: 84 kg (185 lb)

Sport
- Sport: Wrestling
- Event: Freestyle
- Coached by: Daniel Igali

Andrew Adibo Dick (born 11 May 1976 in Abeokuta, Ogun) is an amateur freestyle wrestler from Nigeria, who competes in the men's light heavyweight category. At the age of thirty-six, Dick made his Olympic debut in the 2012 Summer Olympics in London, where he competed in the 84 kg class in men's freestyle wrestling. He lost his first match in the preliminary round to Puerto Rico's Jaime Espinal, with a technical score of 1–9, and a classification score of 1–3. Because Espinal advanced further into the final match against Azerbaijan's Sharif Sharifov, Dick was offered another shot for the bronze medal through the repechage bouts. He withdrew from the competition because of a serious injury, allowing his opponent Dato Marsagishvili of Georgia to qualify directly for the bronze medal bout.
