= Latvia at the 2012 Summer Olympics =

- IOC code: LAT
- NOC: Latvian Olympic Committee
- Website: www.olimpiade.lv (in Latvian and English)

in London
- Competitors: 46 in 12 sports
- Flag bearers: Mārtiņš Pļaviņš (opening); Ineta Radēviča (closing)
- Medals Ranked 49th: Gold 1 Silver 0 Bronze 1 Total 2

Summer Olympics appearances (overview)
- 1924; 1928; 1932; 1936; 1948–1988; 1992; 1996; 2000; 2004; 2008; 2012; 2016; 2020; 2024; 2028

Other related appearances
- Russian Empire (1908–1912); Soviet Union (1952–1988)

Latvia competed at the 2012 Summer Olympics in London, United Kingdom from July 27 to August 12, 2012. This was the nation's tenth appearance at the Summer Olympics.

The Latvian Olympic Committee sent a total of 46 athletes to the Games, 32 men and 14 women, to compete in 12 sports. Sixteen athletes had competed in Beijing, including silver medalist Ainārs Kovals in the men's javelin throw, and defending Olympic champion Māris Štrombergs in men's BMX cycling. Pistol shooter and Olympic gold medalist Afanasijs Kuzmins, the oldest of the team, at age 65, became the first Latvian athlete to compete in nine Olympic games (including three of his appearances under the Soviet Union), tying the record set by Austria's Hubert Raudaschl. Meanwhile, Jeļena Rubļevska, who won silver in Athens, became the first female modern pentathlete to compete at four Olympics, since the sport's introduction to women in 2000. Among the twelve sports played by the athletes, Latvia marked its Olympic debut in table tennis.

Latvia left London with only one gold and one bronze medal. Māris Štrombergs, who managed to successfully defend his Olympic title in the men's BMX cycling, became the first Latvian athlete to win two Olympic gold medals in the post-Soviet era. Meanwhile, Mārtiņš Pļaviņš, who became Latvia's flag bearer at the opening ceremony, and his partner Jānis Šmēdiņš won the nation's first-ever Olympic medal in men's beach volleyball.

== Medalists ==
Medal	Name	Sport	Event	Date
Gold	Māris Štrombergs	Cycling	Men's BMX	10 August
Bronze	Mārtiņš Pļaviņš; Jānis Šmēdiņš	Volleyball	Men's beach volleyball	9 August

== Athletics ==
Latvian athletes have so far achieved qualifying standards in the following athletics events (up to a maximum of 3 athletes in each event at the 'A' Standard, and 1 at the 'B' Standard):

Key

- Note – Ranks given for track events are within the athlete's heat only
- Q = Qualified for the next round
- q = Qualified for the next round as a fastest loser or, in field events, by position without achieving the qualifying target
- NR = National record
- N/A = Round not applicable for the event
- Bye = Athlete not required to compete in round

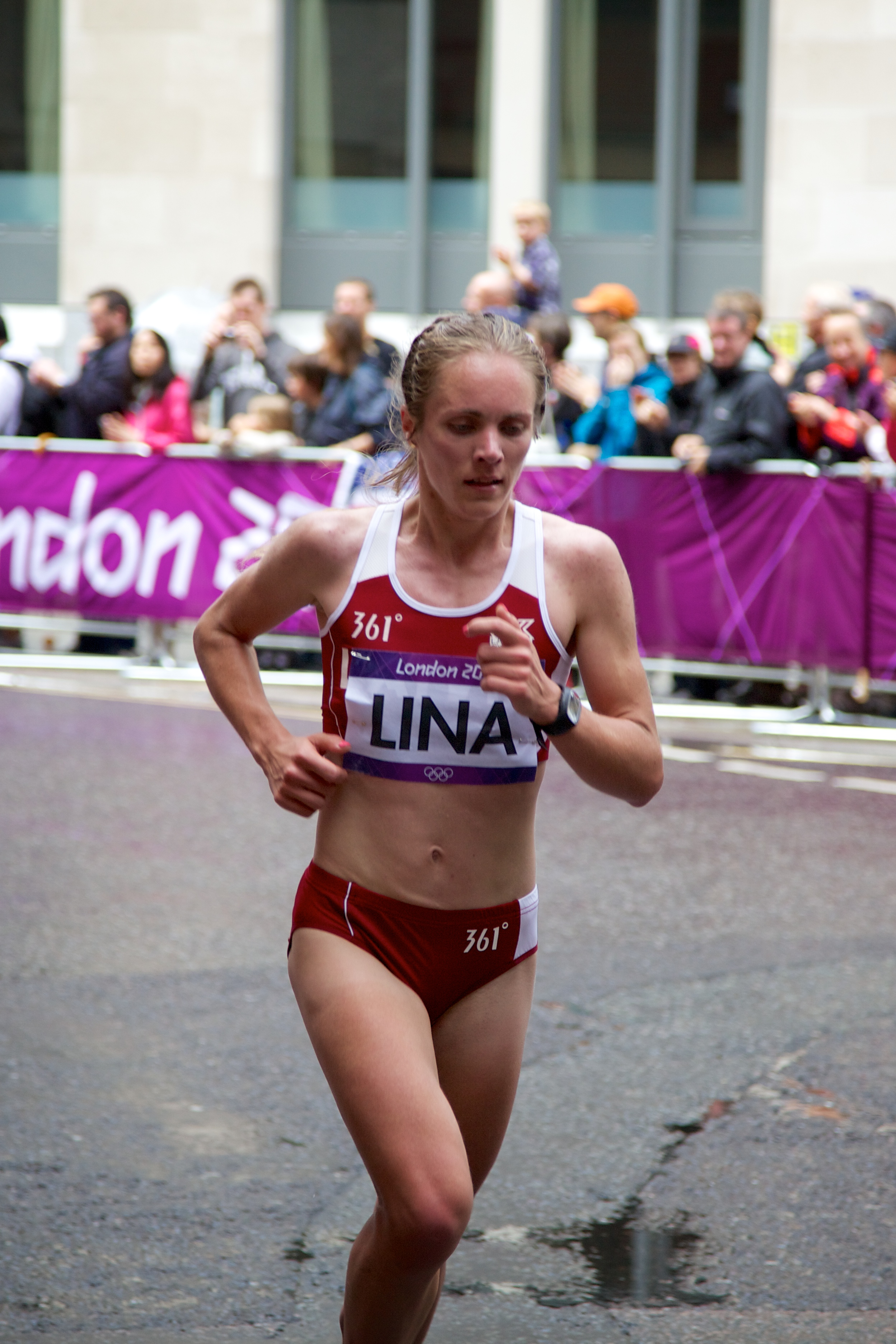
Dace Lina in women's marathon.

Men
Track & road events

Athlete	Event	Heat		Quarterfinal		Semifinal		Final	
Athlete	Event	Result	Rank	Result	Rank	Result	Rank	Result	Rank
Ronalds Arājs	100 m	Withdrew due to injury							
Dmitrijs Jurkevičs	1500 m	3:41.40	9	—N/a		Did not advance			
Igors Kazakēvičs	50 km walk	—N/a						4:06:47	45
Jānis Leitis	400 m	46.41	5	—N/a		Did not advance			
Arnis Rumbenieks	20 km walk	—N/a						1:26:26	45
Valērijs Žolnerovičs	Marathon	—N/a						DNF	

Field events

Athlete	Event	Qualification		Final	
Athlete	Event	Distance	Position	Distance	Position
Mareks Ārents	Pole vault	5.35	22	Did not advance	
Ainārs Kovals	Javelin throw	79.19	17	Did not advance	
Zigismunds Sirmais	Javelin throw	NM	—	Did not advance	
Igors Sokolovs	Hammer throw	72.76	21	Did not advance	
Māris Urtāns	Shot put	19.13	27	Did not advance	
Vadims Vasiļevskis	Javelin throw	72.81	38	Did not advance	

Combined events – Decathlon

Athlete	Event	100 m	LJ	SP	HJ	400 m	110H	DT	PV	JT	1500 m	Final	Rank
Edgars Eriņš	Result	10.99	6.98	13.45	1.93	50.62	15.22	45.10	4.50	57.35	4:35.88	7649	22
Edgars Eriņš	Points	863	809	695	740	786	823	769	760	698	706	7649	22

Women
Track & road events

Athlete	Event	Heat		Final	
Athlete	Event	Result	Rank	Result	Rank
Dace Lina	Marathon	—N/a		2:47:47	98
Poļina Jeļizarova	3000 m steeplechase	9:27.21	4 Q	9:38.56	11
Agnese Pastare	20 km walk	—N/a		1:31:54	24

Field events

Athlete	Event	Qualification		Final	
Athlete	Event	Distance	Position	Distance	Position
Lauma Grīva	Long jump	6.10	28	Did not advance	
Līna Mūze	Javelin throw	59.91	13	Did not advance	
Sinta Ozoliņa-Kovala	Javelin throw	58.86	20	Did not advance	
Madara Palameika	Javelin throw	60.62	10 q	60.73	8
Ineta Radēviča	Long jump	~~6.68~~ DQ	~~5 q~~ DQ	~~6.88~~ DQ	~~4~~ DQ

Combined events – Heptathlon

Athlete	Event	100H	HJ	SP	200 m	LJ	JT	800 m	Final	Rank
Aiga Grabuste	Result	13.65	1.77	13.52	DNS	—	—	—	DNF	
Aiga Grabuste	Points	1028	941	762	0	—	—	—	DNF	
Laura Ikauniece	Result	13.71	1.83	12.64	24.16	6.13	51.27	2:12.13	6414	7
Laura Ikauniece	Points	1020	1016	704	965	890	885	934	6414	7

== Canoeing ==
=== Sprint ===
Athlete	Event	Heats		Semifinals		Final	
Athlete	Event	Time	Rank	Time	Rank	Time	Rank
Aleksejs Rumjancevs; Krists Straume	Men's K-2 200 m	34.447	5 Q	34.140	5 FB	36.110	11

Qualification Legend: FA = Qualify to final (medal); FB = Qualify to final B (non-medal)

== Cycling ==
=== Road ===
Athlete	Event	Time	Rank
Aleksejs Saramotins	Men's road race	5:46:37	56

=== BMX ===
Athlete	Event	Seeding		Quarterfinal		Semifinal		Final	
Athlete	Event	Result	Rank	Points	Rank	Points	Rank	Result	Rank
Māris Štrombergs	Men's BMX	38.697	11	8	2 Q	10	3 Q	37.576	1st place, gold medalist(s)
Edžus Treimanis	Men's BMX	DNF	32	12	2 Q	14	5	Did not advance	
Rihards Veide	Men's BMX	38.753	13	19	3 q	18	7	Did not advance	
Sandra Aleksejeva	Women's BMX	41.752	13	—N/a		19	7	Did not advance	

== Gymnastics ==
=== Artistic ===
Men

Athlete	Event	Qualification								Final							
Athlete	Event	Apparatus						Total	Rank	Apparatus						Total	Rank
Athlete	Event	F	PH	R	V	PB	HB	Total	Rank	F	PH	R	V	PB	HB	Total	Rank
Dmitrijs Trefilovs	All-around	12.900	14.233	13.133	14.733	13.533	14.033	82.565	38	Did not advance							

== Judo ==
Athlete	Event	Round of 32	Round of 16	Quarterfinals	Semifinals	Repechage	Final / BM	
Athlete	Event	Opposition Result	Opposition Result	Opposition Result	Opposition Result	Opposition Result	Opposition Result	Rank
Konstantīns Ovčiņņikovs	Men's −81 kg	Guilheiro (BRA); L 0002–0010	Did not advance					
Jevgeņijs Borodavko	Men's −100 kg	Liu (ASA); W 0100–0000	Peters (GER); L 0000–0011	Did not advance				

== Modern pentathlon ==
Athlete	Event	Fencing (épée one touch)			Swimming (200 m freestyle)			Riding (show jumping)			Combined: shooting/running (10 m air pistol)/(3000 m)			Total points	Final rank
Athlete	Event	Results	Rank	MP points	Time	Rank	MP points	Penalties	Rank	MP points	Time	Rank	MP Points	Total points	Final rank
Deniss Čerkovskis	Men's	23–12	4	952	2:10.78	28	1232	224	32	976	10:46.88	13	2416	5576	19
Jeļena Rubļevska	Women's	25–10	1	1000	2:26.93	32	1040	64	16	1136	12:17.22	15	2052	5228	8

== Shooting ==
Men

Athlete	Event	Qualification		Final	
Athlete	Event	Points	Rank	Points	Rank
Afanasijs Kuzmins	25 m rapid fire pistol	569	17	Did not advance	

== Swimming ==
Latvian swimmers have so far achieved qualifying standards in the following events (up to a maximum of 2 swimmers in each event at the Olympic Qualifying Time (OQT), and potentially 1 at the Olympic Selection Time (OST)):

Men

Athlete	Event	Heat		Semifinal		Final	
Athlete	Event	Time	Rank	Time	Rank	Time	Rank
Uvis Kalniņš	100 m freestyle	49.96	30	Did not advance			

Women

Athlete	Event	Heat		Semifinal		Final	
Athlete	Event	Time	Rank	Time	Rank	Time	Rank
Gabriela Ņikitina	50 m freestyle	26.26	39	Did not advance			

== Table tennis ==
Latvia has qualified the following players.

Athlete	Event	Preliminary round	Round 1	Round 2	Round 3	Round 4	Quarterfinals	Semifinals	Final / BM	
Athlete	Event	Opposition Result	Opposition Result	Opposition Result	Opposition Result	Opposition Result	Opposition Result	Opposition Result	Opposition Result	Rank
Matīss Burģis	Men's singles	Bye	Hinse (CAN); W 4–3	Smirnov (RUS); L 0–4	Did not advance					

== Volleyball ==
=== Beach ===
Athlete	Event	Preliminary round	Standing	Round of 16	Quarterfinals	Semifinals	Final / BM	
Athlete	Event	Opposition Score	Standing	Opposition Score	Opposition Score	Opposition Score	Opposition Score	Rank
Mārtiņš Pļaviņš; Jānis Šmēdiņš	Men's	Pool E Erdmann – Matysik (GER); W 2 – 1 (19–21, 23–21, 15–9); Hernández – Villafañe (VEN); W 2 – 0 (21–14, 21–16); Nummerdor – Schuil (NED); W 2 – 0 (21–14, 21–18)	1 Q	Skarlund – Spinnangr (NOR); W 2 – 0 (21–18, 21–16)	Gibb – Rosenthal (USA); W 2 – 1 (19–21, 21–18, 15–11)	Alison – Emanuel (BRA); L 0 – 2 (15–21, 20–22)	Nummerdor – Schuil (NED); W 2 – 1 (19–21, 21–19, 15–11)	3rd place, bronze medalist(s)
Aleksandrs Samoilovs; Ruslans Sorokins	Men's	Pool D Fijałek – Prudel (POL); W 2 – 1 (12–21, 21–15, 15–12); Chiya – Goldschmidt (RSA); W 2 – 0 (21–13, 21–10); Gibb – Rosenthal (USA); L 0 – 2 (10–21, 16–21)	3 Q	Brink – Reckermann (GER); L 0 – 2 (12–21, 17–21)	Did not advance			9

== Weightlifting ==
Latvia has qualified the following athletes.

Athlete	Event	Snatch		Clean & Jerk		Total	Rank
Athlete	Event	Result	Rank	Result	Rank	Total	Rank
Artūrs Plēsnieks	Men's −105 kg	175	10	215	5	390	7

== Wrestling ==
Latvia has qualified the following quota places.

Key

- VT - Victory by Fall.
- PP - Decision by Points - the loser with technical points.
- PO - Decision by Points - the loser without technical points.

Men's freestyle

Athlete	Event	Qualification	Round of 16	Quarterfinal	Semifinal	Repechage 1	Repechage 2	Final / BM	
Athlete	Event	Opposition Result	Opposition Result	Opposition Result	Opposition Result	Opposition Result	Opposition Result	Opposition Result	Rank
Armands Zvirbulis	−84 kg	Bye	Díaz (VEN); W 3–1 ^{PP}	Gattsiev (BLR); L 1–3 ^{PP}	Did not advance				10

Women's freestyle

Athlete	Event	Qualification	Round of 16	Quarterfinal	Semifinal	Repechage 1	Repechage 2	Final / BM	
Athlete	Event	Opposition Result	Opposition Result	Opposition Result	Opposition Result	Opposition Result	Opposition Result	Opposition Result	Rank
Anastasija Grigorjeva	−63 kg	Bye	Pirozhkova (USA); W 3–1 ^{PP}	Battsetseg (MGL); L 0–3 ^{PO}	Did not advance				9
