= Wrestling at the 2012 Summer Olympics – Men's freestyle 84 kg =

Men's freestyle 84 kg at the Games of the XXX Olympiad
- Venue: ExCeL London
- Date: 11 August 2012
- Competitors: 19 from 19 nations

Medalists
1st place, gold medalist(s)		Sharif Sharifov	Azerbaijan
2nd place, silver medalist(s)		Jaime Espinal	Puerto Rico
3rd place, bronze medalist(s)		Dato Marsagishvili	Georgia
3rd place, bronze medalist(s)		Ehsan Lashgari	Iran

Men's freestyle 84 kilograms competition at the 2012 Summer Olympics in London, United Kingdom, took place on 11 August at ExCeL London. This freestyle wrestling competition consisted of a single-elimination tournament, with a repechage used to determine the winners of two bronze medals. The two finalists faced off for gold and silver medals. Each wrestler who lost to one of the two finalists moved into the repechage, culminating in a pair of bronze medal matches featuring the semifinal losers each facing the remaining repechage opponent from their half of the bracket.

Each bout consisted of up to three rounds, lasting two minutes apiece. The wrestler who scored more points in each round was the winner of that rounds; the bout finished when one wrestler had won two rounds (and thus the match).

== Schedule ==
All times are British Summer Time (UTC+01:00)

Date	Time	Event
11 August 2012	13:00	Qualification rounds
11 August 2012	17:45	Repechage
11 August 2012	18:30	Finals

== Results ==
Legend

- D — Disqualified
- WO — Won by walkover

=== Final ===
Final
Jaime Espinal (PUR)	1	0
Sharif Sharifov (AZE)	6	2

=== Top half ===
Qualifications

1/8 finals
Andrew Dick (NGR)	0	1
Jaime Espinal (PUR)	7	2
Orgodolyn Üitümen (MGL)	1	4
Dato Marsagishvili (GEO)	9	7
Mohamed Riad Louafi (ALG)	0	3
Soslan Gattsiev (BLR)	2	4
José Daniel Díaz (VEN)	1	0	0
Armands Zvirbulis (LAT)	0	1	1

1/4 finals
Jaime Espinal (PUR)	6	7
Dato Marsagishvili (GEO)	4	1
Soslan Gattsiev (BLR)	1	2
Armands Zvirbulis (LAT)	0	2

Semifinals
Jaime Espinal (PUR)	7	8
Soslan Gattsiev (BLR)	2	0

=== Bottom half ===
Qualifications
Zaurbek Sokhiev (UZB)	5	2	0
Ibragim Aldatov (UKR)	1	3	2
Ehsan Lashgari (IRI)	1	4
Yermek Baiduashov (KAZ)	0	0
Yusup Abdusalomov (TJK)	4	0	0
Gadzhimurad Nurmagomedov (ARM)	0	2	2

1/8 finals
Humberto Arencibia (CUB)	4	0	1
Jake Herbert (USA)	1	8	1
İbrahim Bölükbaşı (TUR)	1	3
Sharif Sharifov (AZE)	3	5
Anzor Urishev (RUS)	3	3	4
Ibragim Aldatov (UKR)	0	4	1
Ehsan Lashgari (IRI)	1	4
Gadzhimurad Nurmagomedov (ARM)	0	0^{D}

1/4 finals
Jake Herbert (USA)	1	0
Sharif Sharifov (AZE)	4	6
Anzor Urishev (RUS)	0	1
Ehsan Lashgari (IRI)	3	3

Semifinals
Sharif Sharifov (AZE)	1	0	2
Ehsan Lashgari (IRI)	0	2	1

=== Repechage ===
Repechage round 2
Andrew Dick (NGR)
Dato Marsagishvili (GEO)	W	O
İbrahim Bölükbaşı (TUR)	1	1	5
Jake Herbert (USA)	0	4	4

Bronze medals
Dato Marsagishvili (GEO)	3	3
Soslan Gattsiev (BLR)	0	1
İbrahim Bölükbaşı (TUR)	2	0
Ehsan Lashgari (IRI)	3	3

== Final standing ==
Rank	Athlete
1st place, gold medalist(s)	Sharif Sharifov (AZE)
2nd place, silver medalist(s)	Jaime Espinal (PUR)
3rd place, bronze medalist(s)	Dato Marsagishvili (GEO)
3rd place, bronze medalist(s)	Ehsan Lashgari (IRI)
5	Soslan Gattsiev (BLR)
5	İbrahim Bölükbaşı (TUR)
7	Jake Herbert (USA)
8	Anzor Urishev (RUS)
9	Ibragim Aldatov (UKR)
10	Armands Zvirbulis (LAT)
11	Gadzhimurad Nurmagomedov (ARM)
12	Zaurbek Sokhiev (UZB)
13	Humberto Arencibia (CUB)
14	Orgodolyn Üitümen (MGL)
15	Yusup Abdusalomov (TJK)
16	Mohamed Riad Louafi (ALG)
17	José Daniel Díaz (VEN)
18	Andrew Dick (NGR)
19	Yermek Baiduashov (KAZ)
