= Nurmagomedov =

Nurmagomedov (Russian: Нурмагомедов) is a North Caucasian masculine surname originating from the Dagestan area, its feminine counterpart is Nurmagomedova from the Arabic Nur Muhammad (Light of/from Muhammad). It may refer to

- Abdulmanap Nurmagomedov (1962–2020), Russian martial arts coach (father of Khabib)
- Abubakar Nurmagomedov (born 1989), Russian mixed martial artist (cousin of Khabib)
- Gadzhimurad Nurmagomedov (born 1987), Armenian freestyle wrestler of Dagestani descent
- Khabib Nurmagomedov (born 1988), Russian mixed martial artist (son of Abdulmanap and former UFC lightweight champion)
- Said Nurmagomedov (born 1992), Russian mixed martial artist
- Umar Nurmagomedov (born 1996), Russian mixed martial artist (cousin of Khabib, Elder brother of Bellator lightweight champion Usman)
- Usman Nurmagomedov (born 1998), Russian mixed martial artist (cousin of Khabib, Younger brother of Umar, PFL Lightweight champion)
