= Gadzhimurad =

Gadzhimurad (Russian: Гаджимурад) is a masculine given name common for the Dagestan region of Russia. It may refer to the following notable people:

- Gadzhimurad Antigulov (born 1987), Russian mixed martial artist
- Gadzhimurad Nurmagomedov (born 1987), Armenian freestyle wrestler of Dagestani descent
- Gadzhimurad Rashidov (born 1995), Russian freestyle wrestler
