= 2019 World Wrestling Championships – Men's freestyle 97 kg =

Men's freestyle 97 kg at the 2019 World Championships
- Venue: Barys Arena
- Dates: 21–22 September 2019
- Competitors: 26 from 26 nations

Medalists
gold medal	Abdulrashid Sadulaev	Russia
silver medal	Sharif Sharifov	Azerbaijan
bronze medal	Kyle Snyder	United States
bronze medal	Magomedgaji Nurov	North Macedonia

The men's freestyle 97 kilograms is a competition featured at the 2019 World Wrestling Championships, and was held in Nur-Sultan, Kazakhstan on 21 and 22 September.

This freestyle wrestling competition consists of a single-elimination tournament, with a repechage used to determine the winner of two bronze medals. The two finalists face off for gold and silver medals. Each wrestler who loses to one of the two finalists moves into the repechage, culminating in a pair of bronze medal matches featuring the semifinal losers each facing the remaining repechage opponent from their half of the bracket.

Abdulrashid Sadulaev from Russia won the gold medal.

== Results ==
=== Final ===
Final
Sharif Sharifov (AZE)	0
Abdulrashid Sadulaev (RUS)	4

=== Top half ===
Round of 32
Magomed Ibragimov (UZB)	10
Radosław Baran (POL)	0
Seo Min-won (KOR)	4
Sharif Sharifov (AZE)	11
Valeriy Andriytsev (UKR)	8
Aliaksandr Hushtyn (BLR)	7
İbrahim Çiftçi (TUR)	1
Ali Shabani (IRI)	9

Round of 16
Kyle Snyder (USA)	10
Mausam Khatri (IND)	0
Albert Saritov (ROU)	5
Magomed Ibragimov (UZB)	6
Sharif Sharifov (AZE)	4
Valeriy Andriytsev (UKR)	0
Ali Shabani (IRI)	8
Elizbar Odikadze (GEO)	11

Quarterfinals
Kyle Snyder (USA)	13
Magomed Ibragimov (UZB)	3
Sharif Sharifov (AZE)	6
Elizbar Odikadze (GEO)	0

Semifinals
Kyle Snyder (USA)	2
Sharif Sharifov (AZE)	5

=== Bottom half ===
Round of 32
Lukas Krasauskas (LTU)	0
Magomed Musaev (KGZ)	11
Naoya Akaguma (JPN)	1
Alisher Yergali (KAZ)	11
Erik Thiele (GER)	6
Jordan Steen (CAN)	0
José Daniel Díaz (VEN)	4
Rustam Iskandari (TJK)	2
Magomedgaji Nurov (MKD)	9
Hosam Merghany (EGY)	1
Nicolae Ceban (MDA)	11
Maxwell Lacey (CRC)	1

Round of 16
Ölziisaikhany Batzul (MGL)	4
Magomed Musaev (KGZ)	4
Alisher Yergali (KAZ)	2
Erik Thiele (GER)	1
José Daniel Díaz (VEN)	2
Magomedgaji Nurov (MKD)	7
Nicolae Ceban (MDA)	2
Abdulrashid Sadulaev (RUS)	12

Quarterfinals
Ölziisaikhany Batzul (MGL)	0
Alisher Yergali (KAZ)	10
Magomedgaji Nurov (MKD)	0
Abdulrashid Sadulaev (RUS)	6

Semifinals
Alisher Yergali (KAZ)	1
Abdulrashid Sadulaev (RUS)	8

=== Repechage ===
Repechage round 1
Seo Min-won (KOR)	6
Valeriy Andriytsev (UKR)	4

Repechage round 2
Seo Min-won (KOR)	0
Elizbar Odikadze (GEO)	4
Nicolae Ceban (MDA)	1
Magomedgaji Nurov (MKD)	2

Bronze medals
Elizbar Odikadze (GEO)	0
Kyle Snyder (USA)	5
Magomedgaji Nurov (MKD)	8
Alisher Yergali (KAZ)	5
