= Kyrylo Mieshkov =

Ukrainian freestyle wrestler

Personal information
- Nationality: Ukraine

Sport
- Sport: Wrestling
- Event: Freestyle
Medal record
Men's freestyle wrestling
Representing Ukraine
FILA European Wrestling Championships
Bronze medal – third place	2018 Kaspiysk	92 kg

Kyrylo Mieshkov (Ukrainian: Кирило Мєшков) is a male wrestler from Ukraine, who competes in the men's -92 kg freestyle division.

== Career ==
Kyrylo represented Ukraine at the 2018 European Championships in Kaspiysk, Russia, and won bronze medal.
