= 2018 European Wrestling Championships – Men's freestyle 92 kg =

The men's freestyle 125 kg is a competition featured at the 2018 European Wrestling Championships, and was held in Kaspiysk, Russia on May 5 and May 6.

== Medalists ==
Gold	Abdulrashid Sadulaev; Russia
Silver	Sharif Sharifov; Azerbaijan
Bronze	Serdar Böke; Turkey
Bronze	Kyrylo Mieshkov; Ukraine

== Results ==
Legend

- F — Won by fall

=== Main Bracket ===
Round of 16
Gabriel Seregelyi (GER)	4
Serdar Böke (TUR)	6
Sebastian Jezierzański (POL)	3
Edgaras Voitechovskis (LTU)	2
Irakli Mtsituri (GEO)	4
Ivan Yankouski (BLR)	4
Shamir Atyan (ARM)	4^{F}
Albin Frid (SWE)	0
Kyrylo Mieshkov (UKR)	14
Boban Savev (MKD)	4
Dominic Peter (AUT)	0
Abdulrashid Sadulaev (RUS)	10

Quarterfinals
Nicolae Ceban (MDA)	0
Sharif Sharifov (AZE)	10
Serdar Böke (TUR)	6
Sebastian Jezierzański (POL)	4
Irakli Mtsituri (GEO)	3
Shamir Atyan (ARM)	0
Kyrylo Mieshkov (UKR)	0
Abdulrashid Sadulaev (RUS)	11

Semifinals
Sharif Sharifov (AZE)	10
Serdar Böke (TUR)	0
Irakli Mtsituri (GEO)	2
Abdulrashid Sadulaev (RUS)	12

Final
Sharif Sharifov (AZE)	1
Abdulrashid Sadulaev (RUS)	2

=== Repechage ===
Repechage round 1
Dominic Peter (AUT)	0
Kyrylo Mieshkov (UKR)	4

Bronze medal match
Nicolae Ceban (MDA)	4
Serdar Böke (TUR)	6
Kyrylo Mieshkov (UKR)	6
Irakli Mtsituri (GEO)	6
