= 2021 Poland Open =

2021 Ziolkowski, Pytlasinski, Poland Open
- Host city: Warsaw, Poland
- Dates: 8–13 June, 2021
- Stadium: Arena Ursynów

Champions
- Freestyle: United States
- Greco-Roman: Uzbekistan
- Women: Ukraine

The 2021 Poland Open was an amateur wrestling event held in Warsaw, Poland between 8 and 13 June 2021. It served as the last United World Wrestling Ranking Series event of the year and played a role with regard to the 2020 Summer Olympics and 2021 World Championships' seeding. The event consisted of three competitions: the Waclaw Ziolkowski Memorial (men's freestyle wrestling), Wladyslaw Pytlasinski Cup (men's Greco-Roman wrestling) and Poland Open (women's wrestling).

== Medal table ==
| Rank | Nation | Gold | Silver | Bronze | Total |
|---|---|---|---|---|---|
| 1 | Iran | 5 | 3 | 1 | 9 |
| 2 | United States | 4 | 2 | 4 | 10 |
| 3 | Poland | 4 | 1 | 6 | 11 |
| 4 | Uzbekistan | 3 | 2 | 5 | 10 |
| 5 | Ukraine | 2 | 6 | 7 | 15 |
| 6 | Russia | 2 | 0 | 2 | 4 |
| 7 | Turkey | 1 | 2 | 2 | 5 |
| 8 | India | 1 | 1 | 0 | 2 |
| 8 | Nigeria | 1 | 1 | 0 | 2 |
| 10 | Azerbaijan | 1 | 0 | 2 | 3 |
| 11 | Kyrgyzstan | 1 | 0 | 1 | 2 |
| 12 | France | 1 | 0 | 0 | 1 |
| 12 | Germany | 1 | 0 | 0 | 1 |
| 12 | Serbia | 1 | 0 | 0 | 1 |
| 12 | Slovakia | 1 | 0 | 0 | 1 |
| 12 | Sweden | 1 | 0 | 0 | 1 |
| 17 | Georgia | 0 | 2 | 0 | 2 |
| 17 | Hungary | 0 | 2 | 0 | 2 |
| 19 | Canada | 0 | 1 | 1 | 2 |
| 20 | Belarus | 0 | 1 | 0 | 1 |
| 20 | Egypt | 0 | 1 | 0 | 1 |
| 20 | Estonia | 0 | 1 | 0 | 1 |
| 20 | Italy | 0 | 1 | 0 | 1 |
| 20 | Japan | 0 | 1 | 0 | 1 |
| 20 | Mongolia | 0 | 1 | 0 | 1 |
| 26 | Kazakhstan | 0 | 0 | 7 | 7 |
| 27 | Bulgaria | 0 | 0 | 1 | 1 |
| 27 | San Marino | 0 | 0 | 1 | 1 |
| Totals (28 entries) | | 30 | 29 | 40 | 99 |

=== Team ranking ===
| Rank | Men's freestyle | | Men's Greco-Roman | | Women's freestyle | |
| Rank | Team | Points | Team | Points | Team | Points |
|---|---|---|---|---|---|---|
| 1 | United States | 130 | Uzbekistan | 130 | Ukraine | 158 |
| 2 | Iran | 87 | Poland | 108 | Russia | 122 |
| 3 | Poland | 85 | Turkey | 85 | Poland | 94 |
| 4 | Ukraine | 80 | Hungary | 76 | United States | 168 |
| 5 | Uzbekistan | 79 | Ukraine | 75 | Kyrgyzstan | 59 |

== Medal overview ==
=== Men's freestyle (Waclaw Ziolkowski Memorial) ===
June 8–9

| Event | Gold | Silver | Bronze |
|---|---|---|---|
| 57 kg | Stevan Mićić; Serbia | Beka Bujiashvili; Georgia | Makhmudjon Shavkatov; Uzbekistan |
| 61 kg | Gulomjon Abdullaev; Uzbekistan | Ravi Kumar Dahiya; India | Nurislam Sanayev; Kazakhstan |
| 65 kg | Yianni Diakomihalis; United States | Eduard Grigorew; Poland | Joseph McKenna; United States |
| 70 kg | Alec Pantaleo; United States | James Green; United States | Haji Aliyev; Azerbaijan |
| 74 kg | Mostafa Hosseinkhani; Iran | Frank Chamizo; Italy | Daniyar Kaisanov; Kazakhstan |
| 74 kg | Mostafa Hosseinkhani; Iran | Frank Chamizo; Italy | Khadzhimurad Gadzhiyev; Azerbaijan |
| 79 kg | Akhsarbek Gulaev; Slovakia | Rashid Kurbanov; Uzbekistan | Mateusz Kampik; Poland |
| 79 kg | Akhsarbek Gulaev; Slovakia | Rashid Kurbanov; Uzbekistan | Vasyl Mykhailov; Ukraine |
| 86 kg | Zahid Valencia; United States | Sandro Aminashvili; Georgia | Cezary Sadowski; Poland |
| 86 kg | Zahid Valencia; United States | Sandro Aminashvili; Georgia | Myles Amine; San Marino |
| 92 kg | Zbigniew Baranowski; Poland | Illia Archaia; Ukraine | Nathan Jackson; United States |
| 92 kg | Zbigniew Baranowski; Poland | Illia Archaia; Ukraine | Krzysztof Sadowik; Poland |
| 97 kg | Mohammad Hossein Mohammadian; Iran | Ali Shabani; Iran | Alisher Yergali; Kazakhstan |
| 97 kg | Mohammad Hossein Mohammadian; Iran | Ali Shabani; Iran | Alireza Karimi; Iran |
| 125 kg | Amir Hossein Zare; Iran | Nick Gwiazdowski; United States | Yusup Batirmurzaev; Kazakhstan |
| 125 kg | Amir Hossein Zare; Iran | Nick Gwiazdowski; United States | Oleksandr Koldovskyi; Ukraine |

=== Men's Greco-Roman (Wladyslaw Pytlasinski Cup) ===
12–13 June

| Event | Gold | Silver | Bronze |
|---|---|---|---|
| 55 kg | Max Nowry; United States | Not awarded | Not awarded |
| 55 kg | Max Nowry; United States | Not awarded | Not awarded |
| 60 kg | Michal Jacek Tracz; Poland | Ekrem Öztürk; Turkey | Mukhammadkodir Yusupov; Uzbekistan |
| 63 kg | Islomjon Bakhramov; Uzbekistan | Ayata Suzuki; Japan | Christoph Kraemer; Germany |
| 63 kg | Islomjon Bakhramov; Uzbekistan | Ayata Suzuki; Japan | Krisztián Kecskeméti; Hungary |
| 67 kg | Murat Firat; Turkey | Mohamed Ibrahim El-Sayed; Egypt | Bogdan Kovernyuk; Ukraine |
| 67 kg | Murat Firat; Turkey | Mohamed Ibrahim El-Sayed; Egypt | Elmurat Tasmuradov; Uzbekistan |
| 72 kg | Gevorg Sahakyan; Poland | Mirzobek Rakhmatov; Uzbekistan | Krisztian Vancza; Hungary |
| 72 kg | Gevorg Sahakyan; Poland | Mirzobek Rakhmatov; Uzbekistan | Cengiz Arslan; Turkey |
| 77 kg | Abuyazid Mantsigov; Russia | Tamas Levai; Hungary | Yasaf Zeinalov; Ukraine |
| 77 kg | Abuyazid Mantsigov; Russia | Tamas Levai; Hungary | Roman Vlasov; Russia |
| 82 kg | Jalgasbay Berdimuratov; Uzbekistan | Yaroslav Filchakov; Ukraine | Alex Bjurberg Kessidis; Sweden |
| 82 kg | Jalgasbay Berdimuratov; Uzbekistan | Yaroslav Filchakov; Ukraine | Rafig Huseynov; Azerbaijan |
| 87 kg | Semen Novikov; Ukraine | Istvan Takacs; Hungary | Rustam Assakalov; Uzbekistan |
| 87 kg | Semen Novikov; Ukraine | Istvan Takacs; Hungary | Metehan Başar; Turkey |
| 97 kg | Mohammad Hadi Saravi; Iran | Mehdi Bali; Iran | Islam Abbasov; Azerbaijan |
| 97 kg | Mohammad Hadi Saravi; Iran | Mehdi Bali; Iran | Arvi Savolainen; Finland |
| 130 kg | Amin Mirzazadeh; Iran | Ali Akbar Yousefi; Iran | Eduard Popp; Germany |
| 130 kg | Amin Mirzazadeh; Iran | Ali Akbar Yousefi; Iran | Muminjon Abdullaev; Uzbekistan |

=== Women's freestyle (Poland Open) ===
10–11 June

| Event | Gold | Silver | Bronze |
|---|---|---|---|
| 50 kg | Mariya Stadnik; Azerbaijan | Oksana Livach; Ukraine | Valentina Islamova; Kazakhstan |
| 50 kg | Mariya Stadnik; Azerbaijan | Oksana Livach; Ukraine | Maria Tyumerekova; Russia |
| 53 kg | Vinesh Phogat; India | Khrystyna Bereza; Ukraine | Amy Fearnside; United States |
| 53 kg | Vinesh Phogat; India | Khrystyna Bereza; Ukraine | Katarzyna Krawczyk; Poland |
| 55 kg | Olga Khoroshavtseva; Russia | Erdenechimegiin Sumiyaa; Mongolia | Iryna Chykhradze; Ukraine |
| 57 kg | Odunayo Adekuoroye; Nigeria | Iryna Kurachkina; Belarus | Tetyana Kit; Ukraine |
| 57 kg | Odunayo Adekuoroye; Nigeria | Iryna Kurachkina; Belarus | Jowita Wrzesień; Poland |
| 59 kg | Anhelina Lysak; Poland | Yulia Lisovska; Ukraine | Diana Kayumova; Kazakhstan |
| 62 kg | Aisuluu Tynybekova; Kyrgyzstan | Ana Godinez; Canada | Ilona Prokopevniuk; Ukraine |
| 62 kg | Aisuluu Tynybekova; Kyrgyzstan | Ana Godinez; Canada | Lyubov Ovcharova; Russia |
| 65 kg | Henna Johansson; Sweden | Anastasia Lavrenchuk; Ukraine | Taybe Yusein; Bulgaria |
| 65 kg | Henna Johansson; Sweden | Anastasia Lavrenchuk; Ukraine | Aleksandra Wólczyńska; Poland |
| 68 kg | Koumba Larroque; France | Blessing Oborududu; Nigeria | Forrest Molinari; United States |
| 68 kg | Koumba Larroque; France | Blessing Oborududu; Nigeria | Meerim Zhumanazarova; Kyrgyzstan |
| 72 kg | Alla Belinska; Ukraine | Buse Tosun; Turkey | Zhamila Bakbergenova; Kazakhstan |
| 76 kg | Aline Rotter-Focken; Germany | Epp Mäe; Estonia | Erica Wiebe; Canada |
| 76 kg | Aline Rotter-Focken; Germany | Epp Mäe; Estonia | Natalia Vorobieva; Russia |

== Participating nations ==
284 competitors from 40 nations participated.

- Algeria (8)
- Azerbaijan (6)
- Azerbaijan (2)
- Brazil (3)
- Bulgaria (1)
- Canada (5)
- Chile (1)
- Croatia (2)
- Denmark (4)
- Egypt (8)
- Estonia (6)
- France (2)
- Georgia (4)
- Germany (9)
- Hungary (9)
- India (1)
- Iran (13)
- Italy (2)
- Japan (1)
- Kazakhstan (14)
- Kyrgyzstan (5)
- Lithuania (4)
- Mongolia (3)
- North Macedonia (1)
- Nigeria (4)
- Norway (6)
- Peru (1)
- Poland (39)
- Romania (22)
- Russia (17)
- San Marino (1)
- Serbia (2)
- Switzerland (1)
- Slovakia (2)
- Sweden (3)
- Tunisia (1)
- Turkey (20)
- Ukraine (23)
- United States (21)
- Uzbekistan (17)
