= Yermek Baiduashov =

Kazakh wrestler (born 1982)

Personal information
- Full name: Yermek Satybaldyyevich; Baiduashov
- Nationality: Kazakhstan
- Born: 20 July 1982 (age 44) Shymkent, Kazakh SSR, Soviet Union
- Weight: 84 kg (185 lb)

Sport
- Sport: Wrestling
- Event: Freestyle
Medal record
Men's freestyle wrestling
Representing Kazakhstan
Asian Games
| Bronze medal – third place | 2010 Guangzhou | 84 kg |

Yermek Satybaldyyevich Baiduashov (Kazakh: Ермек Сатыбалдыұлы Байдуашов, Ermek Satybaldyūly Baiduaşov; born July 20, 1982, in Shymkent) is an amateur Kazakh freestyle wrestler, who competed in the men's light heavyweight category. He won a bronze medal at the 2010 Asian Games in Guangzhou, China.

Baiduashov represented Kazakhstan at the 2012 Summer Olympics in London, where he competed in the men's 84 kg class. He lost the qualifying match to Iran's Ehsan Lashgari, who was able to score five points in two straight periods, leaving Baiduashov without a single point.
