= Dato Marsagishvili =

Georgian wrestler

Medal record

Men's freestyle wrestling

Representing Georgia

Olympic Games
Bronze medal – third place	2012 London	84 kg

World Championships
Bronze medal – third place	2011 Istanbul	84 kg

European Championships
Silver medal – second place	2011 Dortmund	84 kg
Gold medal – first place	2012 Belgrade	84 kg
Gold medal – first place	2013 Tbilisi	84 kg
Bronze medal – third place	2016 Riga	86 kg

Dato Marsagishvili (Georgian: დათო მარსაგიშვილი; born March 30, 1991) is a male wrestler from Georgia, born in Stepantsminda.

At the 2012 Summer Olympics, despite losing the quarterfinals against Jaime Espinal of Puerto Rico, he was offered another shot in the repechage rounds, winning against Nigeria's Andrew Dick via walkout and defeating Soslan Gattsiev of Belarus, thus winning the bronze medal at the 2012 Summer Olympics in the men's 84 kg category.

Dato Marsagishvili retired from Olympic wrestling in 2021 and stopped competing for a spot in the Tokyo Olympics.
