= Alisher Yergali =

Kazakhstani freestyle wrestler

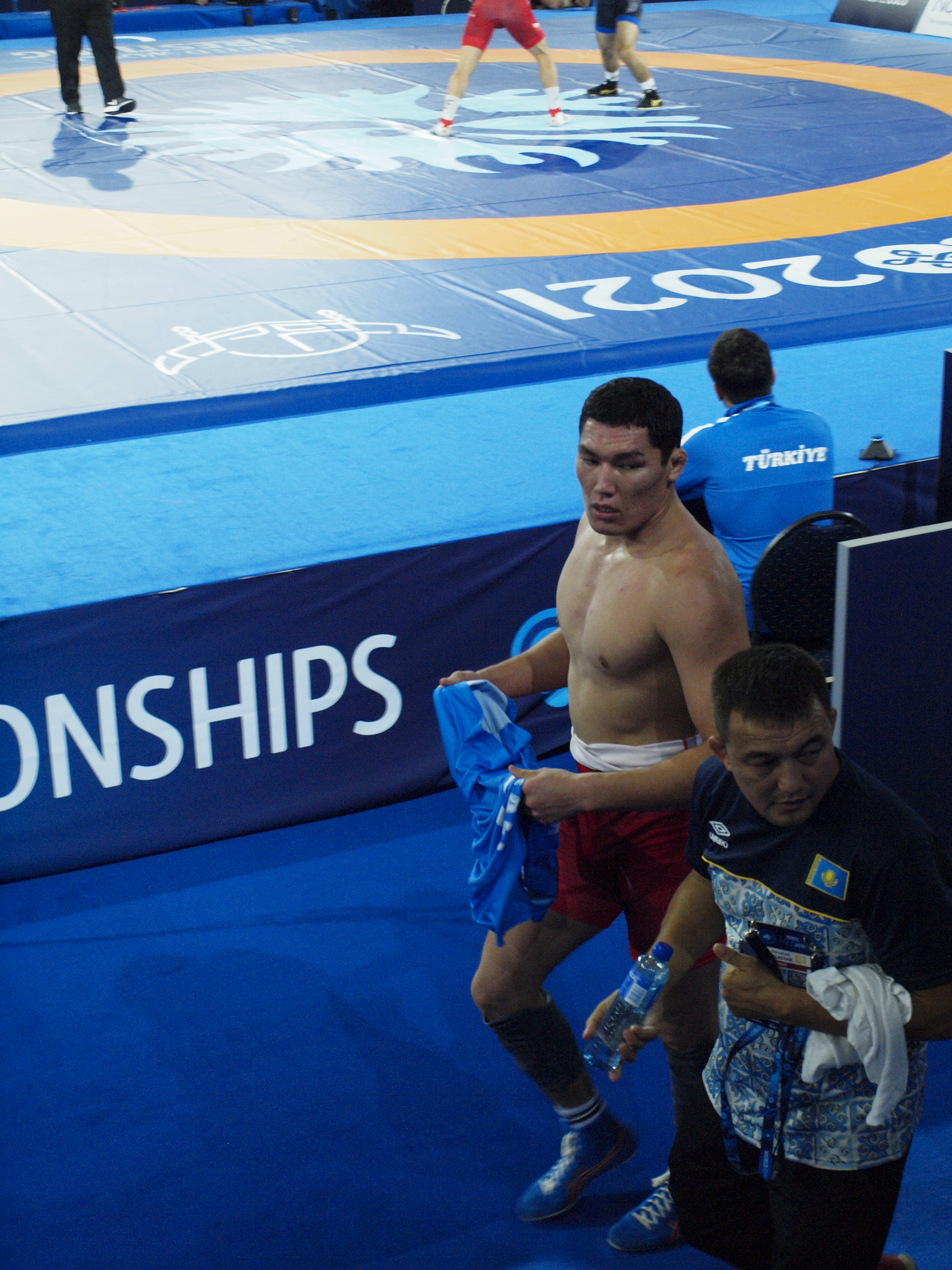
- Yergali at the 2021 World Wrestling Championships in Oslo, Norway

Personal information
- Born: 12 April 1999 (age 27)

Sport
- Country: Kazakhstan
- Sport: Amateur wrestling
- Weight class: 97 kg; 125 kg
- Event: Freestyle
Medal record
Men's freestyle wrestling
Representing Kazakhstan
Asian Championships
Silver medal – second place	2022 Ulaanbaatar	125 kg
Silver medal – second place	2021 Almaty	97 kg
Bronze medal – third place	2019 Xi'an	97 kg
Bronze medal – third place	2020 New Delhi	97 kg
Yasar Dogu Tournament
Silver medal – second place	2025 Kocaeli	125 kg
Grand Prix
Gold medal – first place	2019 Warsaw	125 kg
Gold medal – first place	2022 Taraz	125 kg
Gold medal – first place	2021 Rome	97 kg
Gold medal – first place	2024 Budapest	97 kg
Bronze medal – third place	2022 Tunisia	125 kg
Bronze medal – third place	2023 Budapest	97 kg
World U23 Championships
Bronze medal – third place	2022 Pontevedra	125 kg
World Juniors Championships
Silver medal – second place	2018 Trnava	92 kg

Alisher Yergali (born 12 April 1999) is a Kazakh freestyle wrestler. He is a four-time medalist at the Asian Wrestling Championships. He represented Kazakhstan at the 2020 Summer Olympics in Tokyo, Japan and the 2024 Summer Olympics in Paris, France.

== Career ==
Yergali won the bronze medal at the Asian Wrestling Championships, both in 2019 and in 2020.

In 2019, Yergali competed in the men's freestyle 97 kg event at the World Wrestling Championships held in Nur-Sultan, Kazakhstan. He lost his bronze medal match against Magomedgadzhi Nurov of North Macedonia.

In 2021, Yergali won one of the bronze medals in the men's 97 kg event at the Poland Open held in Warsaw. He competed in the men's freestyle 97 kg event at the 2020 Summer Olympics held in Tokyo, Japan. He won his first match against Mohammed Fardj of Algeria by walkover and he was then eliminated by Süleyman Karadeniz of Turkey.

Yergali competed at the 2022 Yasar Dogu Tournament held in Istanbul, Turkey. He won the silver medal in the men's 125 kg event at the 2022 Asian Wrestling Championships held in Ulaanbaatar, Mongolia.

He competed at the 2024 Asian Wrestling Olympic Qualification Tournament in Bishkek, Kyrgyzstan and he earned a quota place for Kazakhstan for the 2024 Summer Olympics in Paris, France. He competed in the men's freestyle 97 kg event at the Olympics. He was eliminated in the repechage by Amir Ali Azarpira of Iran.

== Achievements ==
Year	Tournament	Location	Result	Event
2019	Asian Championships	Xi'an, China	3rd	Freestyle 97 kg
2020	Asian Championships	New Delhi, India	3rd	Freestyle 97 kg
2021	Asian Championships	Almaty, Kazakhstan	2nd	Freestyle 97 kg
2022	Asian Championships	Ulaanbaatar, Mongolia	2nd	Freestyle 125 kg
