= Soslan Gattsiev =

Belarusian freestyle wrestler

Personal information
- Full name: Soslan Magometovich Gattsiev
- Nationality: Belarus
- Born: 27 September 1985 (age 40) Andijan, Uzbekistan
- Height: 1.76 m (5 ft 9 1/2 in)
- Weight: 84 kg (185 lb)

Sport
- Sport: Wrestling
- Event: Freestyle
- Club: SHVSM Homel
- Coached by: Aleksandr Khotilov

Achievements and titles
- Olympic finals: London 2012 5-th place
- World finals: Military World Champion 2008
- Regional finals: Cadet European Champion 2002

Soslan Magometovich Gattsiev (Uzbek: Сослан Магометович Гатциев; born September 27, 1985, in Andijan, Uzbekistan) is an amateur Belarusian freestyle wrestler of Uzbek origin, who competes in the men's light heavyweight category. Gattsiev represented Belarus at the 2012 Summer Olympics in London, where he competed in the 84 kg class. He lost the semifinal match to Puerto Rico's Jaime Espinal, with a score of 2–15. Gattsiev, however, was offered another shot for the bronze medal bout in the repechage, where he was eventually outclassed and beaten by reigning European champion Dato Marsagishvili of Georgia, with a set-score of 0–3 and 1–3.
