= Jaime Espinal =

Puerto Rican freestyle wrestler

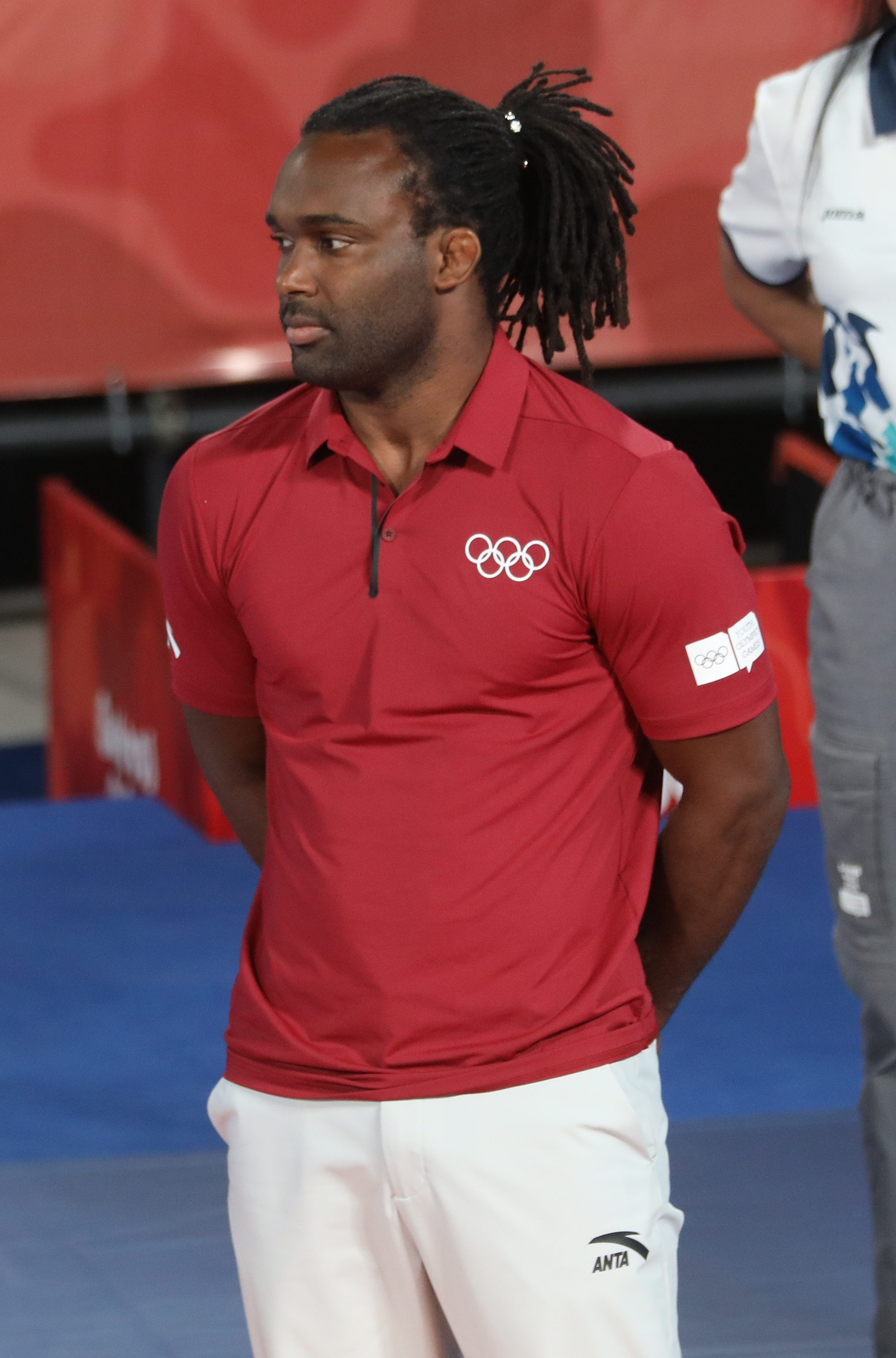
- Espinal at the 2018 Summer Youth Olympics

Personal information
- Nationality: Dominican; Puerto Rican
- Born: October 14, 1984 (age 41) Santo Domingo, Dominican Republic
- Height: 1.78 m (5 ft 10 in)
- Weight: 86 kg (190 lb)

Sport
- Sport: Wrestling
- Event: Freestyle
- Club: Sparta; Nittany Lion Wrestling Club
- Coached by: Pedro Rojas
Medal record
Men's freestyle wrestling
Representing Puerto Rico
Olympic Games
Silver medal – second place	2012 London	84 kg
Pan American Games
Bronze medal – third place	2015 Toronto	86 kg
Central American and Caribbean Games
Gold medal – first place	2010 Mayagüez	84 kg
Bronze medal – third place	2014 Veracruz	86 kg

Jaime Yusept Espinal Fajardo (born October 14, 1984) is a Dominican-born Puerto Rican freestyle wrestler. In 2012 he became the first Olympic medalist in wrestling for Puerto Rico by winning a silver medal in the 84 kg division. He also became the first Puerto Rican who was born somewhere else to win an Olympic medal for the country, and the second person to win a silver medal for Puerto Rico at an Olympic Games, after boxer Luis Francisco Ortiz, who won his in 1984.

== Early years and education ==
Espinal was born to Jaime Felix Espinal and Alejandrina Fajardo Hernández. He has two siblings: Stanley and Rose Marie. When he was 5 years old, his family moved to Puerto Rico. Espinal studied at the Baptist College and then Gabriela Mistral High School. He began wrestling when he was nine years old when coach Pedro Rojas approached him and other kids and invited them to Club Sparta in Río Piedras along with Franklin Gómez.

When he was 15 years old, Espinal and his mother moved to Brooklyn, New York. Espinal stated he had to deal with racism and fights "every two or three days". After a real bad fight, his mother decided to send him back to Puerto Rico alone. Espinal stop wrestling and began cheerleading and dancing. He received a scholarship in cheerleading from the University of Puerto Rico at Bayamón. Espinal continued college at Walden University in Pennsylvania. He completed a Bachelor's degree in computer design.

Before his international wrestling career, Espinal spent three years as a breakdancer for the Time Machine Squad, entering the group after winning a contest. In 2008, he went by the name of "Olimpic Jumps" as part of the group. During that time, he served as a backup dancer for hip hop artists like Daddy Yankee and Tego Calderón. He also practiced baseball and worked as a model. However, convinced by coach Rojas, Espinal returned to wrestling.

== Wrestling career ==
To prepare for the 2010 Central American and Caribbean Games, his coach, Pedro Rojas, sent Espinal to train in Cuba for nine months. As a result, Espinal won gold at the Central American and Caribbean Games in Mayagüez, Puerto Rico.

In 2011, Espinal finished in fifth place at the 2011 Pan American Games in Guadalajara, Mexico. That same year, he won silver at the Pan American Wrestling Qualifying Tournament in Florida.

The next year, Espinal continued to excel in the sport finishing third at the Romanian International Tournament, and winning gold at the Città di Sassari Wrestling Championship in Italy. That year, at the 2012 Panamerican Wrestling Tournament in Kissimmee, Florida, Espinal qualified for the 2012 Summer Olympics.

=== 2012 Olympics ===
At the 2012 Summer Olympics in London, England, Espinal began the first rounds by defeating Nigeria Andrew Dick and Georgian Dato Marsagishvili. On the semi-finals, he defeated Soslan Gattsiev, from Belarus, to advance to the final round against Sharif Sharifov, from Azerbaijan. In the match, Sharifov defeated Espinal 3–1 to earn the gold. Espinal finished with the silver medal. His medal was Puerto Rico's second silver in 17 Summer Olympics, and their second medal as a country in London.

=== 2016 Olympics ===
At the 2016 Summer Olympics in Rio de Janeiro, Espinal was defeated in the first round of the 86 kg division by Selim Yaşar of Turkey. He was then defeated in the repechage by Reineris Salas of Cuba. Espinal was the flag bearer for Puerto Rico during the Parade of Nations.

== Personal life ==
Espinal is in a relationship with Mexican wrestler Jane Valencia. Their first daughter Joy Espinal Valencia was born on May 31, 2017.

== See also ==
- Dominican Republic immigration to Puerto Rico
- List of people from the Dominican Republic
- List of Puerto Ricans

Olympic Games
Preceded by Javier Culson	Flagbearer for Puerto Rico; Rio de Janeiro 2016	Succeeded by Charles Flaherty
