= Serdar Böke =

Turkish freestyle wrestler

Personal information
- Born: 17 September 1986 (age 40)
- Height: 174 cm (5 ft 9 in)

Sport
- Country: Turkey
- Sport: Amateur wrestling
- Event: Freestyle
Medal record
Men's freestyle wrestling
Representing Turkey
European Championships
Bronze medal – third place	2018 Kaspiysk	92 kg
Mediterranean Games
Gold medal – first place	2013 Mersin	84 kg

Serdar Böke (born 17 September 1986) is a Turkish freestyle wrestler. He won one of the bronze medals in the 92 kg event at the 2018 European Wrestling Championships held in Kaspiysk, Russia.

== Career ==
He won the gold medal in the men's freestyle 84 kg event at the 2013 Mediterranean Games held in Mersin, Turkey. In the same year, he also competed in the men's freestyle 84 kg event at the 2013 World Wrestling Championships held in Budapest, Hungary. He was eliminated in his third match by Taimuraz Friev of Spain.

In 2018, he also competed in the men's freestyle 92 kg at the World Wrestling Championships in Budapest, Hungary. He was eliminated in his first match by Atsushi Matsumoto of Japan.

== Achievements ==
Year	Tournament	Location	Result	Event
2013	Mediterranean Games	Mersin, Turkey	1st	Freestyle 84 kg
2018	European Championships	Kaspiysk, Russia	3rd	Freestyle 92 kg
