= Gadzhimurad Nurmagomedov =

Armenian Olympic wrestler

Personal information
- Born: 1 May 1987 (age 39) Makhachkala, Dagestan Autonomous Soviet Socialist Republic, Soviet Union
- Height: 1.73 m (5 ft 8 in)
- Weight: 84 kg (185 lb)

Sport
- Sport: Wrestling
- Event: Freestyle
- Coached by: Nasir Gadzhihanov; Araik Baghdadyan

Gadzhimurad Nurmagomedov (Armenian: Հաջիմուրադ Նուրմոհամեդով, born 1 May 1987) is an Armenian Freestyle wrestler of Dagestani descent. He competed at the 2012 Summer Olympics in the men's freestyle 84 kg division. Nurmagomedov first defeated former Olympic silver medalist Yusup Abdusalomov in the first preliminary match, with a technical score of 4–4, and a classification score of 1–3. For the second preliminary match, Nurmagomedov, however, was defeated by Ehsan Lashgari, who scored a total of five points in two successive periods, while also being disqualified in the process.

== Mixed martial arts record ==
Professional record breakdown
5 matches	2 wins	3 losses
By knockout	0	1
By submission	2	2

Res.	Record	Opponent	Method	Event	Date	Round	Time	Location	Notes
Loss	2–3	Arsen Abdulkerimov	Submission (armbar)	M-1 Fighter 2010: Stage 1	July 10, 2010	1	3:30	Saint Petersburg, Russia	
Loss	2–2	Maxim Grishin	TKO (punches)	M-1 Selection 2010: Eastern Europe Round 2	April 10, 2010	1	2:05	Kyiv, Ukraine	M-1 Global Eastern Europe Heavyweight Tournament Opening Round.
Win	2–1	Vladimir Kuchenko	Submission (rear-naked choke)	M-1 Challenge: 2009 Selections 8	October 4, 2009	1	1:40	Moscow, Russia	
Loss	1–1	Ibragim Magomedov	Submission (rear-naked choke)	M-1 Challenge: 2009 Selections 6	September 5, 2009	1	1:30	Makhachkala, Russia	
Win	1–0	Rashid Karimov	Submission (rear-naked choke)	Combat Fighting Club 2007: International MMA Tournament	December 9, 2007	2	3:55	Tyumen, Russia	
