= Sharif Sharifov =

Azerbaijani freestyle wrestler

Sharif Sharifov Şərif Şərifov
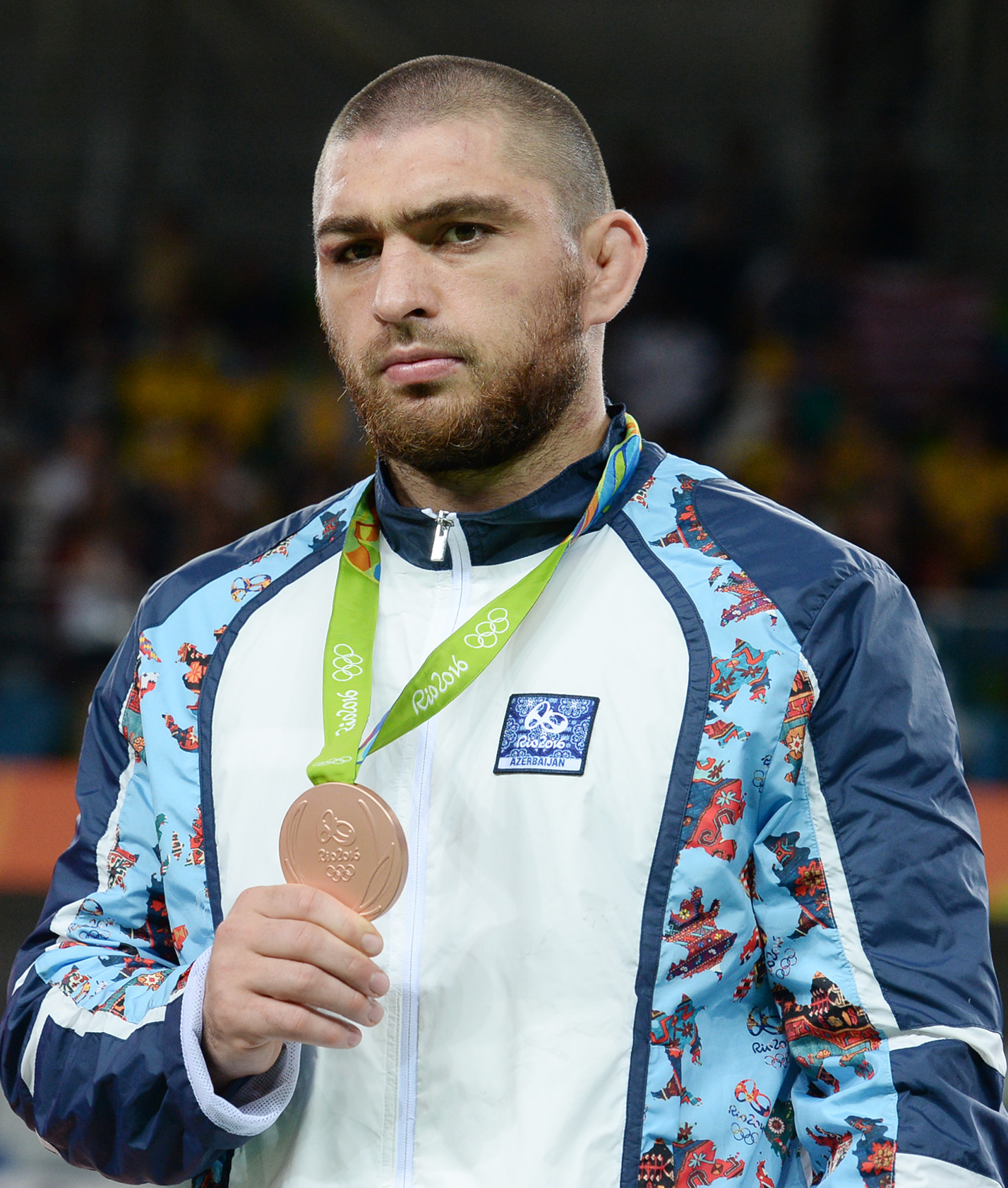

Personal information
- Full name: Sharif Naidhajavovich Sharifov
- National team: Azerbaijan
- Born: 11 November 1988 (age 37) Gunukh, Charodinsky District, Dagestan, Russia
- Height: 1.80 m (5 ft 11 in)
- Weight: 86 kg (190 lb); 97 kg (214 lb)

Sport
- Country: Russia; Azerbaijan
- Sport: Wrestling
- Event: Freestyle
- Club: Gamidov WC; Atasport (AZE)
- Coached by: Anvar Magomedgadzhiev, Omar Kuramagomedov (RUS)
Medal record
Men's freestyle wrestling
Representing Azerbaijan
Olympic Games
Gold medal – first place	2012 London	84 kg
Bronze medal – third place	2016 Rio de Janeiro	86 kg
World Championships
Gold medal – first place	2011 Istanbul	84 kg
Silver medal – second place	2019 Nur-Sultan	97 kg
Bronze medal – third place	2009 Herning	84 kg
European Championships
Gold medal – first place	2019 Bucharest	92 kg
Silver medal – second place	2010 Baku	84 kg
Silver medal – second place	2018 Kaspiysk	92 kg
Bronze medal – third place	2011 Dortmund	84 kg
Islamic Solidarity Games
Bronze medal – third place	2017 Baku	86 kg

Sharif Naidhajavovich Sharifov (Russian: Шариф Наидгаджавович Шарифов, Azerbaijani: Şərif Şərifov; born 11 November 1988, in Gunukh, Charodinsky District, Dagestan) is a Russian-Azerbaijani former wrestler. Sharifov finished first in the World Championships and won a bronze in the European Championships. At the 2012 Summer Olympics Sharifov won a gold medal in the 84 kg event after defeating Puerto Rican Jaime Espinal.

He won a bronze medal at the 2016 Summer Olympics, where he beat Bi Shengfeng and Zbigniew Baranowski before losing to Abdulrashid Sadulaev. Sharifov won the bronze medal after beating Pedro Ceballos in the repechage.
