= Magomedgaji Nurov =

Macedonian freestyle wrestler

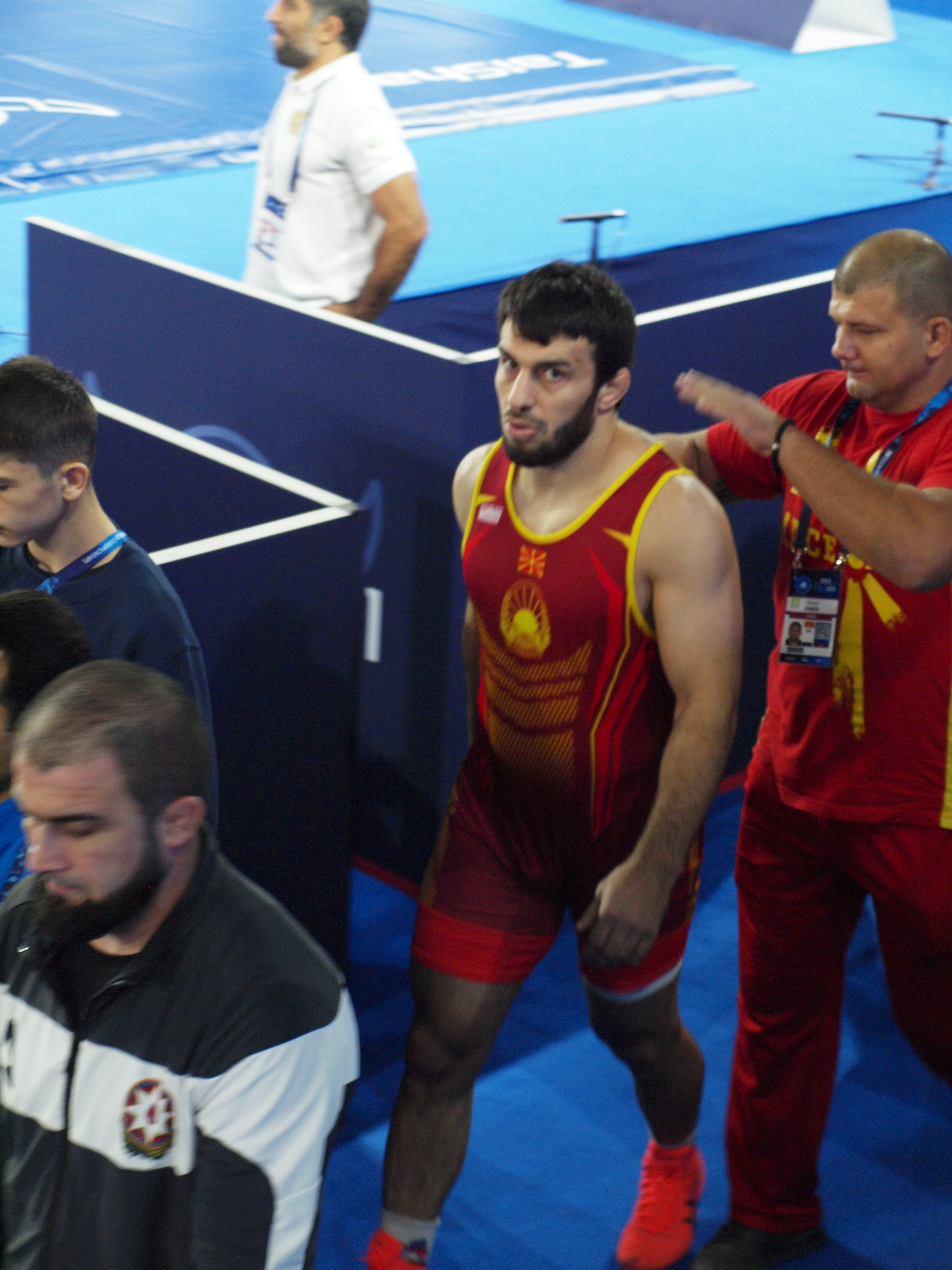
- Magomedgaji Nurov at the 2021 World Wrestling Championships in Oslo, Norway

Personal information
- Native name: Магомедгаджи Омардибирович Нуров
- Full name: Magomedgadji Omardibirovich Nurov
- Nationality: Russian; Macedonian
- Born: 19 April 1993 (age 33) Makhachkala, Dagestan, Russia
- Home town: Skopje, North Macedonia
- Height: 183 cm (6 ft 0 in)

Sport
- Country: North Macedonia
- Sport: Amateur wrestling
- Weight class: 97 kg
- Event: Freestyle
Medal record
Men's freestyle wrestling
Representing North Macedonia
World Championships
Bronze medal – third place	2019 Nur-Sultan	97 kg
Mediterranean Games
Gold medal – first place	2018 Tarragona	97 kg
Gold medal – first place	2022 Oran	97 kg

Magomedgaji Nurov, sometimes written as Magomedgadzhi Nurov (Macedonian: Магомедгаџи Омардибирович Нуров, born 19 April 1993) is a Russian-Macedonian freestyle wrestler. He won one of the bronze medals in the men's 97 kg event at the 2019 World Wrestling Championships held in Nur-Sultan, Kazakhstan. He represented North Macedonia at the 2020 Summer Olympics in Tokyo, Japan.

== Career ==
Nurov won the gold medal in the men's freestyle 97 kg event at the 2018 Mediterranean Games held in Tarragona, Spain.

In 2019, Nurov competed in the men's freestyle 97 kg event at the European Games held in Minsk, Belarus. He lost his bronze medal match against Aliaksandr Hushtyn of Belarus.

Nurov won the gold medal in the men's freestyle 97 kg event at the 2022 Mediterranean Games held in Oran, Algeria. He competed in the 97 kg event at the 2022 World Wrestling Championships held in Belgrade, Serbia.

Nurov competed at the 2024 European Wrestling Olympic Qualification Tournament in Baku, Azerbaijan hoping to qualify for the 2024 Summer Olympics in Paris, France. He was eliminated in his first match and he did not qualify for the Olympics. Nurov also competed at the 2024 World Wrestling Olympic Qualification Tournament held in Istanbul, Turkey without qualifying for the Olympics.

== Achievements ==
Year	Tournament	Location	Result	Event
2018	Mediterranean Games	Tarragona, Spain	1st	Freestyle 97 kg
2019	World Championships	Nur-Sultan, Kazakhstan	3rd	Freestyle 97 kg
2022	Mediterranean Games	Oran, Algeria	1st	Freestyle 97 kg
