= Armands Zvirbulis =

Latvian freestyle wrestler (born 1987)

Personal information
- Nationality: Latvian
- Born: 11 September 1987 (age 39) Gulbene, Latvian SSR, Soviet Union
- Height: 1.77 m (5 ft 10 in)
- Weight: 84 kg (185 lb)

Sport
- Country: Latvia
- Sport: Freestyle wrestling

Armands Zvirbulis (born 11 September 1987) is a Latvian freestyle wrestler. He qualified for 2012 Summer Olympics in London in the men's 84 kg freestyle division. There he reached the quarterfinals, where he lost to Soslan Gattsiyev. He was 5th at the 2011 World Championships. Zvirbulis has won European U-20 Championships in 2007.
