= Gheorghiță Ștefan =

Romanian freestyle wrestler

Personal information
- Nationality: Romanian
- Born: 17 January 1986 (age 40) Bucharest, Romania
- Height: 178 cm (5 ft 10 in)
- Weight: 89 kg (196 lb)
- Spouse: Corina Căprioriu (m. 2016)

Sport
- Club: Rapid; Bucharest
- Coached by: Cornel Zaharia (since 2000); Aurel Cimpoeru (since 2013); Anatoli Guidea (since 2015)
Medal record
Men's freestyle wrestling
Representing Romania
Olympic Games
Bronze medal – third place	2008 Beijing	74 kg
European Championships
Bronze medal – third place	2011 Dortmund	84 kg
Universiade
Gold medal – first place	2013 Kazan	84 kg

Gheorghiță Ștefan (born 17 January 1986 in Bucharest), also known as Ștefan Gheorghiță, is a freestyle wrestler from Romania. He participated in men's freestyle 74 kg at the 2008 Summer Olympics. He lost the bronze medal fight against Murad Gaidarov of Belorussia. However, after a positive doping test Soslan Tigiev of Uzbekistan was in November 2016 stripped of the silver medal. Ștefan Gheorghiță, therefore, moved up to a bronze medal position.

In 2016, he married Romanian judoka Corina Căprioriu.
