= Reineris Salas =

Cuban freestyle wrestler (born 1987)

Personal information
- Full name: Reineris Salas Pérez
- Born: 17 March 1987 (age 39) Havana, Cuba
- Height: 180 cm (5 ft 11 in)

Sport
- Sport: Freestyle wrestling
Medal record
Men's freestyle wrestling
Representing Cuba
Olympic Games
Bronze medal – third place	2020 Tokyo	97 kg
World Championships
Silver medal – second place	2013 Budapest	84 kg
Silver medal – second place	2014 Tashkent	86 kg
Bronze medal – third place	2010 Moscow	84 kg
Pan American Games
Gold medal – first place	2015 Toronto	86 kg
Bronze medal – third place	2019 Lima	97 kg

Reineris Salas Pérez (Note: In this Spanish name, the first or paternal surname is Salas and the second or maternal family name is Pérez.) (born March 17, 1987) is a male freestyle wrestler from Cuba. He is a two time World Freestyle Wrestling Championships silver medalist.

He represented Cuba at the 2020 Summer Olympics. He won the bronze medal in the men's freestyle 97 kg event.

He competed in the 125 kg event at the 2022 World Wrestling Championships held in Belgrade, Serbia.
