= Amir Hossein Zare =

Iranian freestyle wrestler (born 2001)

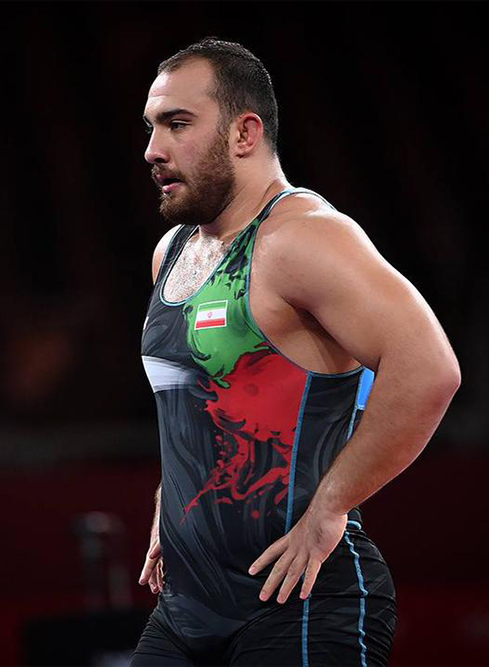
- Zare at 2020 Summer Olympics

Personal information
- Full name: Amir Hossein Zare
- Nicknames: Heavyweight King; Rostam of Iran; The Iranian Giant; Iranian Warrior
- Nationality: Iranian
- Born: 16 January 2001 (age 25) Amol, Mazandaran, Iran
- Education: Islamic Azad University Ayatollah Amoli
- Height: 185 cm (6 ft 1 in)
- Weight: 125 kg (276 lb)

Sport
- Country: (Iran)
- Sport: Wrestling
- Event: Freestyle
- Club: Shahr Bank; Iran Mall; Fooladin Zob Amol; Petro Palayesh Bilish
- Turned pro: 2018
- Coached by: Hamid Aghajani; Ebrahim Mehraban; Gholamreza Mohammadi; Pejman Dorostkar
Medal record
Event	1st	2nd	3rd
Olympic Games	0	1	1
World Championships	4	0	1
Youth Olympic Games	0	1	0
Asian Championships	2	0	0
Asian Games	2	0	0
World U23 Championships	1	0	0
Other	14	1	1
Total	23	3	3
Men's freestyle wrestling
Representing Iran
Olympic Games
Silver medal – second place	2024 Paris	125 kg
Bronze medal – third place	2020 Tokyo	125 kg
World Championships
Gold medal – first place	2021 Oslo	125 kg
Gold medal – first place	2023 Belgrade	125 kg
Gold medal – first place	2025 Zagreb	125 kg
Gold medal – first place	2026 Astana	125 kg
Bronze medal – third place	2022 Belgrade	125 kg
Asian Championships
Gold medal – first place	2024 Bishkek	125 kg
Gold medal – first place	2026 Bishkek	125 kg
Asian Games
Gold medal – first place	2022 Hangzhou	125 kg
Gold medal – first place	2026 Nagoya	125 kg
Islamic Solidarity Games
Gold medal – first place	2025 Riyadh	125 kg
Grand Prix
Gold medal – first place	2020 Rome	125 kg
Gold medal – first place	2021 Warsaw	125 kg
Gold medal – first place	2022 Almaty	125 kg
Gold medal – first place	2023 Zagreb	125 kg
Gold medal – first place	2023 Urmia	125 kg
Gold medal – first place	2024 Zagreb	125 kg
Gold medal – first place	2025 Tirana	125 kg
Gold medal – first place	2025 Shiraz	125 kg
Bronze medal – third place	2019 Vladikavkaz	125 kg
Poddubny wrestling league
Gold medal – first place	2022 Bishkek	125 kg
Gold medal – first place	2024 Moscow	Team
World Club Championship
Gold medal – first place	2019 Bojnourd	Team
World U23 Championships
Gold medal – first place	2019 Budapest	125 kg
World Junior Championships
Silver medal – second place	2019 Tallinn	125 kg
Asian Junior Championships
Gold medal – first place	2019 Chon Buri	125 kg
Youth Olympic Games
Silver medal – second place	2018 Buenos Aires	110 kg
World Cadet Championships
Gold medal – first place	2018 Zagreb	110 kg
Asian Cadet Championships
Gold medal – first place	2018 Tashkent	110 kg

Amir Hossein Zare (Persian: امیرحسین زارع; born 16 January 2001) is an Iranian freestyle wrestler who currently competes in the heavyweight division. Zare became World Championships in 2021, 2023, 2025 and 2026. He was the 2019 U23 World Champion at age 18. He claimed a Tokyo Olympic Games bronze medal in 2021. In the age-group, he was the 2018 Cadet World Champion and claimed silver medals from the 2019 Junior World Championships and the 2018 Youth Summer Olympics.

== Early life ==
Zare started in Pahlevani and zoorkhaneh rituals with his uncle and father from elementary school, then entered wrestling during middle school and he attended the national youth team camp at the age of fourteen. He studied at Governmental leading high school.

== Career ==
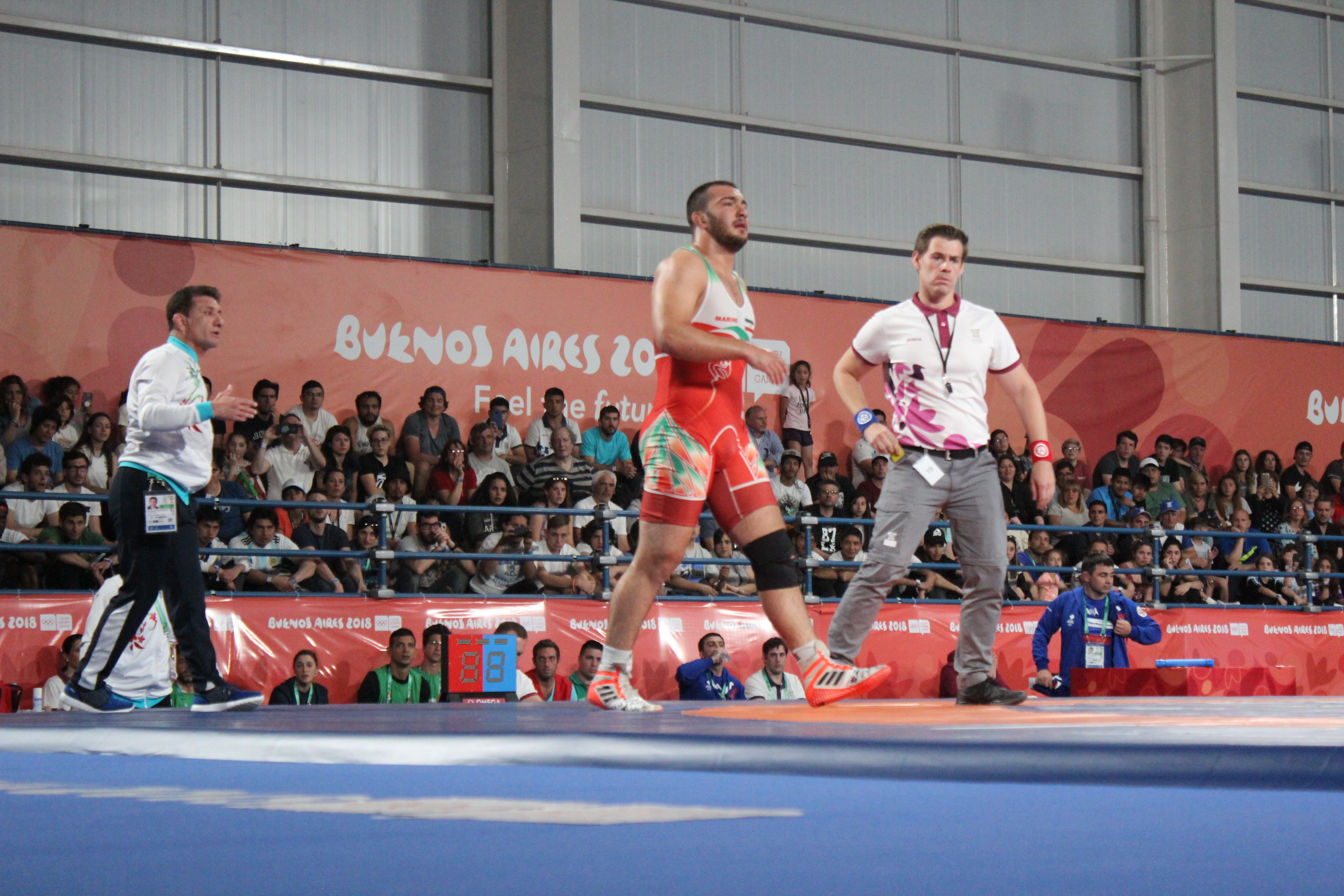
Zare at the 2018 Youth Olympic Games

=== 2018–2019 ===
He competed in his first world competition in 2018 Cadet World Champion won the gold medal. That same year, he won a silver medal in the 110 kg weight class at the 2018 Summer Youth Olympics. Zare made his senior level debut in October 2019 at the age of 18, going 4–0 at the Iranian Premier League with a notable victory over two–time and reigning Asian Continental champion Yadollah Mohebbi. He followed up with his international debut, claiming the 2019 U23 World Championship after cleaning out the bracket with technical falls. Next, he took out reigning World Champion Geno Petriashvili in the final match of the Premier League, claiming gold for the team. He won against Geno Petriashvili in the Iranian Premier League and was a surprise, the result of this match was 15–11. His first loss came at the Alans International, where he placed third with notable and dominant technical falls over the accomplished Khasanboy Rakhimov and Nick Gwiazdowski. To close out the year, he helped Iran reach the gold medal at the World Clubs Cup.

=== 2020–2021 ===
In 2020, Zare only competed twice, claiming the Matteo Pellicone Ranking Series crown with notable wins over 2012 Olympic champion Bilyal Makhov and Nick Matuhin, and placing second at the Team Trials for the Individual World Cup. In 2021, Zare claimed the 2021 Poland Open by beating Nick Gwiazdowski via disqualification after the later refused to engage due to Zare's pressure. In the 2020 Summer Olympics, Zare won a bronze medal by defeating Deng Zhiwei in the Bronze Medal match. After 32 years, Zare won Iran's freestyle wrestling gold medal in the heavyweight division of the World Championships in Norway by defeating Geno Petriashvili.

=== 2022 ===
He won one of the bronze medals in the men's 125 kg event at the 2022 World Wrestling Championships held in Belgrade, Serbia. Zare faced the Canadian Amar Dhesi who has the Pan American gold and silver medals, and beat him wisely 8–0 to win the bronze medal. Zare continued in the tournament 2022 Bolat Turlykhanov Cup held in Almaty, Kazakhstan won the gold medal by defeating Yusup Batirmurzaev.

=== 2023 ===
He won the gold medal in the men's 125 kg event at the 2023 World Wrestling Championships held in Belgrade, Serbia. This was Zare's second gold medal in the world championship., triumphing over Geno Petriashvili from Georgia with a decisive score of 11–0. Referring to this fight, the World Wrestling Federation wrote: Petriashvili had no answer for the tremendous pressure that Zare applied. Zare, who won bronze last year and gold in 2021, added another gold medal to his record. Zare won 4–0 against Taha Akgül in the semifinals.Zare scored a total of 43 points by the end of the tournament. Amir Hossein Zare at the end of the tournament, have secured their spots in the 2024 Summer Olympics in Paris. Zare In the continuation of this year's competitions, won the gold medal at the 2022 Asian Games. He first defeated Zaman Anwar from Pakistan 10-0 and then beat China Buheeerdun 10–0. Zare defeated Yusup Batirmurzaev 11–0 to secure his place in the final. He defeated Mongolia's Mönkhtöriin Lkhagvagerel 7–0 in the men's 125 kg final bout. His gold medal was Iran's 12th gold medal in the 2022 Asian Games.

=== 2024 ===
He started the year by winning a gold medal in Zagreb Open. Zare competed with Amir Reza Masoumi in the final. The bout was a playoff for the Olympic spot as Masoumi had won the national championships. Like their previous encounters, Zare was in control of the bout which he won 5–0. He defeated Aiaal Lazarev, Amar Dhesi, and Taha Akgül, respectively to reach the final. Zare fought his traditional rival, Geno Petriashvili in the final and lost by a close score 10-9 and won the silver medal in the men's freestyle 125 kg event at the 2024 Summer Olympics in Grand Palais Éphémère Paris, France. Zare in year won the gold medal at the 2024 Asian Wrestling Championships by outdoing his opponents without conceding points.

=== 2025 ===
Zare started the new year by winning gold medal in 2025 Takhti Cup, where he defeated Amir Reza Masoumi 8-2 for the fourth consecutive time. Zare In his first international competition, he won a gold medal at the 2025 Muhamet Malo Tournament. Zare in the first major tournament of 2025 won the gold medal in the men's 125 kg event at the 2025 World Wrestling Championships held in Zagreb, Croatia. Zare the final match faced Giorgi Meshvildishvili of Azerbaijan and defeated his opponent 5–0. He had defeated Puerto Rico Jonovan Smith 11–0, Georgian Solomon Manashvili 10–0, and Russian wrestler from Bahrain Shamil Sharipov 7–3 on his way to the final. After winning this gold medal, Zare has become the fourth most decorated Iranian freestyle wrestler in World Competitions, with three World Championship titles and one bronze in his career.

=== 2026 ===
Zare started began the year 2026 by securing two consecutive gold medals in Asia. one at the 2026 Asian Games in Nagoya and another at the Asian Championships in Bishkek.Zare in the first major world tournament of 2026 won the gold medal in the men's 125 kg event at the 2026 World Wrestling Championships held in Astana, Kazakhstan. Zare the final match faced Abdulla Kurbanov of Russia and defeated his opponent 11–0.He defeated Jaspooran Singh 11-0 in the Round of 16, followed by a 10-0 victory over Aaron Johnson in the quarterfinals. Zare then edged Wyatt Hendrickson of United States 10-0 in the semifinals. In edition of the World Championships, Zare scored a total of 42 points against his opponents, without conceding a single point.

== Personal life ==
On 28 December 2025, Zare publicly supported the 2025–2026 Iranian protests on his Instagram by sharing a picture of a protester sitting in front of armed Police Command of the Islamic Republic of Iran and stating: "The response to the people's resistance and unity during the war should not have been like this. If only the homeland was not likened to the mother..."

== Freestyle record ==
International Senior Freestyle Matches
Res.	Record	Opponent	Score	Date	Event	Location
2026 Asian Championships (gold) at 125 kg
Win	60–6	(China) Shamil Sharipov	4-0	12 April 2026	2026 Asian Championships	Bishkek, Kyrgyzstan
Win	59–6	(China) Buheeerdun	5-0	12 April 2026	2026 Asian Championships	Bishkek, Kyrgyzstan
Win	58–6	(Kazakhstan) Yedige Kassimbek	7-0	12 April 2026	2026 Asian Championships	Bishkek, Kyrgyzstan
2026 Asian Games (gold) at 125 kg
Win	57–6	(China) Buheeerdun	12-2	2 October 2026	2026 Asian Games	Nagoya, Japan
Win	56–6	(Kazakhstan) Yedige Kassimbek	3-3	2 October 2026	2026 Asian Games	Nagoya, Japan
Win	55–6	(Turkmenistan) Ziyamuhammet Saparov	11-0	2 October 2026	2026 Asian Games	Nagoya, Japan
Win	54–6	(Japan) Taiki Yamamoto	10-0	2 October 2026	2026 Asian Games	Nagoya, Japan
2025 World Championships (gold) at 125 kg
Win	53–6	(Azerbaijan) Giorgi Meshvildishvili	5-0	14 September 2025	2025 World Championships	Zagreb, Croatia
Win	52–6	(Bahrain) Shamil Sharipov	7-3	13 September 2025	2025 World Championships	Zagreb, Croatia
Win	51–6	(Georgia (country)) Solomon Manashvili	10-0	13 September 2025	2025 World Championships	Zagreb, Croatia
Win	50–6	(Puerto Rico) Jonovan Smith	11-0	13 September 2025	2025 World Championships	Zagreb, Croatia
2025 Takhti Cup (gold) at 125 kg
Win	49–6	(Iran) Amir Reza Masoumi	8–2	9 May 2025	2025 Iranian World Team Trials	Isfahan, Iran
Win	48–6	(Iran) Abolfazl Mohammadnejad	11–0	9 May 2025	2025 Iranian World Team Trials	Isfahan, Iran
Win	47–6	(Iran) Yadollah Mohebbi	5–0	9 May 2025	2025 Iranian World Team Trials	Isfahan, Iran
PWL 2024 (gold) at 125 kg
Win	46–6	(Russia) Shamil Musaev	12–2	24 November 2024	Poddubny Professional Wrestling League	Moscow, Russia
2024 Olympic Games (silver) at 125 kg
Loss	45-6	(Georgia (country)) Geno Petriashvili	9-10	10 August 2024	2024 Olympic Games	Paris, France
Win	45-5	(Turkey) Taha Akgül	2-1	9 August 2024	2024 Olympic Games	Paris, France
Win	44-5	(Canada) Amar Dhesi	10-0	9 August 2024	2024 Olympic Games	Paris, France
Win	43-5	(Kyrgyzstan) Aiaal Lazarev	5–0	9 August 2024	2024 Olympic Games	Paris, France
2022 Asian Games (gold) at 125 kg
Win	42–5	(Mongolia) Mönkhtöriin Lkhagvagerel	7-0	7 October 2023	2022 Asian Games	Hangzhou, China
Win	41–5	(Kazakhstan) Yusup Batirmurzaev	11-0	7 October 2023	2022 Asian Games	Hangzhou, China
Win	40–5	(China) Buheeerdun	10-0	7 October 2023	2022 Asian Games	Hangzhou, China
Win	39–5	(Pakistan) Zaman Anwar	10-0	7 October 2023	2022 Asian Games	Hangzhou, China
2023 World Championships (gold) at 125 kg
Win	38–5	(Georgia (country)) Geno Petriashvili	11-0	17 September 2023	2023 World Championships	Belgrade, Serbia
Win	37–5	(Turkey) Taha Akgül	4-0	17 September 2023	2023 World Championships	Belgrade, Serbia
Win	36–5	(Hungary) Dániel Ligeti	11-4	16 September 2022	2023 World Championships	Belgrade, Serbia
Win	35–5	(Puerto Rico) Jonovan Smith	10-0	16 September 2022	2023 World Championships	Belgrade, Serbia
Win	34–5	(Belarus) Dzianis Khramiankou	7-2	16 September 2022	2023 World Championships	Belgrade, Serbia
2022 World Championships (bronze) at 125 kg
Win	33–5	(Canada) Amar Dhesi	8–0	16 September 2022	2022 World Championships	Belgrade, Serbia
Loss	32–5	(Turkey) Taha Akgül	2–4	15 September 2022	2022 World Championships	Belgrade, Serbia
Win	32–4	(Ukraine) Oleksandr Khotsianivskyi	TF 10–0	15 September 2022	2022 World Championships	Belgrade, Serbia
Win	32–4	(China) Deng Zhiwei	3–0	15 September 2022	2022 World Championships	Belgrade, Serbia
2021 World Championships (gold) at 125 kg
Win	31–4	(Georgia (country)) Geno Petriashvili	9–2	3 October 2021	2021 World Championships	Oslo, Norway
Win	30–4	(Turkey) Taha Akgül	4–0	2 October 2021	2021 World Championships	Oslo, Norway
Win	29–4	(United States) Nick Gwiazdowski	TF 10–0	2 October 2021	2021 World Championships	Oslo, Norway
Win	28–4	(Belarus) Dzianis Khramiankou	6–0	2 October 2021	2021 World Championships	Oslo, Norway
2020 Summer Olympics (bronze) at 125 kg
Win	27–4	(China) Deng Zhiwei	5–0	5 August–6, 2021	2020 Summer Olympics	Tokyo, Japan
Loss	26–4	(Georgia (country)) Geno Petriashvili	3–6	5 August–6, 2021	2020 Summer Olympics	Tokyo, Japan
Win	26–3	(Kosovo) Egzon Shala	TF 13–2	5 August–6, 2021	2020 Summer Olympics	Tokyo, Japan
Win	25–3	(Ukraine) Oleksandr Khotsianivskyi	7–0	5 August–6, 2021	2020 Summer Olympics	Tokyo, Japan
2021 Poland Open (gold) at 125 kg
Win	24–3	(United States) Nick Gwiazdowski	DQ (6–1)	9 June 2021	2021 Poland Open	Warsaw, Poland
Win	22–3	(Ukraine) Oleksandr Kalinovskyi	TF 10–0	9 June 2021	2021 Poland Open	Warsaw, Poland
Win	21–3	(Egypt) Diaaeldin Kamal	TF 10–0	9 June 2021	2021 Poland Open	Warsaw, Poland
2020 IRI World Team Trials (silver) at 125 kg
Loss	20–3	(Iran) Amin Taheri	3–4	5 November 2020	2020 Iranian World Team Trials	Tehran, Iran
Win	20–2	(Iran) Amin Taheri	3–1	5 November 2020	2020 Iranian World Team Trials	Tehran, Iran
Loss	19–2	(Iran) Amin Taheri	0–2	5 November 2020	2020 Iranian World Team Trials	Tehran, Iran
Win	19–1	(Iran) Parviz Hadi	4–0	5 November 2020	2020 Iranian World Team Trials	Tehran, Iran
Win	18–1	(Iran) Yadollah Mohebbi	4–1	5 November 2020	2020 Iranian World Team Trials	Tehran, Iran
2020 Matteo Pellicone Ranking Series (gold) at 125 kg
Win	17–1	(Russia) Bilyal Makhov	5–3	15 January–18, 2020	Matteo Pellicone Ranking Series 2020	Rome, Italy
Win	16–1	(Germany) Nick Matuhin	8–0	15 January–18, 2020	Matteo Pellicone Ranking Series 2020	Rome, Italy
Win	15–1	(Kazakhstan) Yusup Batirmurzaev	Fall	15 January–18, 2020	Matteo Pellicone Ranking Series 2020	Rome, Italy
2019 World Clubs Cup (gold) for Team Bazar-e Bozorg at 125 kg
Win	14–1	(Georgia (country)) FF	FF	17 December–21, 2019	2019 World Clubs Cup	Bojnoord, Iran
Win	13–1	(Canada) Amir Bazrafshan	10–2	17 December–21, 2019	2019 World Clubs Cup	Bojnoord, Iran
2019 Alans International (bronze) at 125 kg
Win	12–1	(United States) Nick Gwiazdowski	TF 10–0	7 December–8, 2019	2019 Alans International	Vladikavkaz, Russia
Loss	11–1	(Russia) Batradz Gazzaev	2–3	7 December–8, 2019	2019 Alans International	Vladikavkaz, Russia
Win	11–0	(Russia) Atsamaz Tebloev	FF	7 December–8, 2019	2019 Alans International	Vladikavkaz, Russia
Win	10–0	(Uzbekistan) Khasanboy Rakhimov	TF 12–2	7 December–8, 2019	2019 Alans International	Vladikavkaz, Russia
2019 Iranian Premier League (gold) for Team Grand Bazaar at 125 kg
Win	9–0	(Georgia (country)) Geno Petriashvili	15–11	22 November 2019	2019 Iranian Premier League	Tehran, Iran
2019 U23 World Championships (gold) at 125 kg
Win	8–0	(Russia) Vitaly Goloev	TF 10–0	28–30 October 2019	2019 U23 World Championships	Budapest, Hungary
Win	7–0	(Georgia (country)) Zuriko Urtashvili	TF 11–0	28–30 October 2019	2019 U23 World Championships	Budapest, Hungary
Win	6–0	(Kazakhstan) Yusup Batirmurzaev	TF 17–7	28–30 October 2019	2019 U23 World Championships	Budapest, Hungary
Win	5–0	(Moldova) Samhan Jabrailov	TF 11–0	28–30 October 2019	2019 U23 World Championships	Budapest, Hungary
Win	4–0	(Iran) Soheil Yousefi		6 October–7, 2019	2019 Iranian Premier League	Tehran, Iran
Win	3–0	(Iran) Vahid Yousefvand		6 October–7, 2019	2019 Iranian Premier League	Tehran, Iran
Win	2–0	(Iran) Yadollah Mohebbi		6 October–7, 2019	2019 Iranian Premier League	Tehran, Iran
Win	1–0	(Iran) Soheil Gholipour Safar		6 October–7, 2019	2019 Iranian Premier League	Tehran, Iran
