= Wyatt Hendrickson =

American wrestler (born 2001)

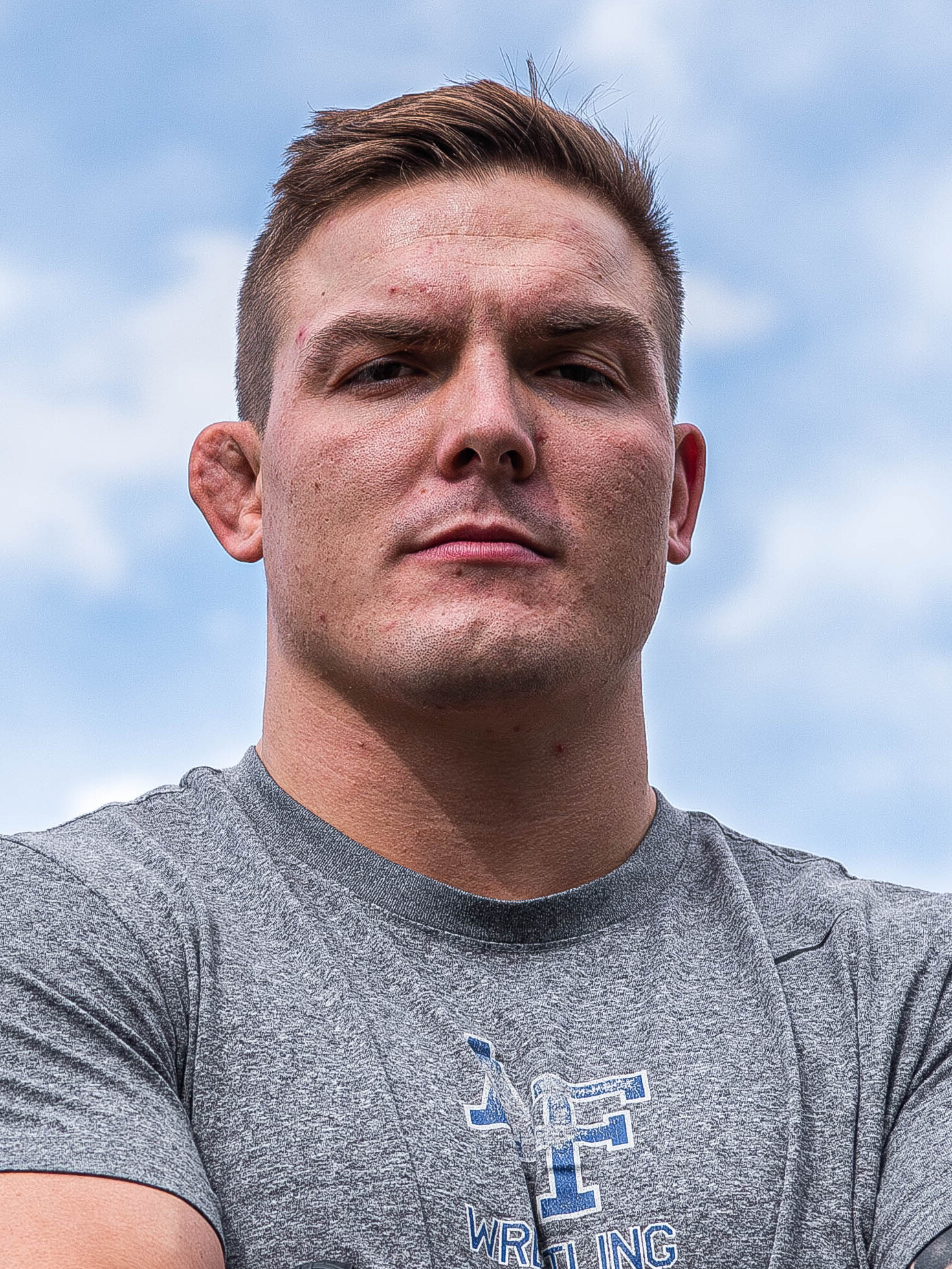
- Hendrickson in 2024

Personal information
- Born: January 13, 2001 (age 25) Newton, Kansas, U.S.
- Education: United States Air Force Academy, Oklahoma State University
- Height: 6 ft 2 in (188 cm)
- Weight: 250 lb (113 kg)
- Spouse: Emily Hendrickson

Sport
- Country: United States
- Sport: Wrestling
- Event: Folkstyle wrestling
- College team: Oklahoma State Cowboys; Air Force Falcons
- Club: Cowboy RTC
- Coached by: David Taylor
Medal record
Men's freestyle wrestling
Representing the United States
World Championships
Bronze medal – third place	2026 Astana	125 kg
Pan American Championships
Gold medal – first place	2025 Monterrey	125 kg
Gold medal – first place	2026 Coralville	125 kg
Grand Prix
Silver medal – second place	2026 Zagreb	125 kg
Bronze medal – third place	2026 Tirana	125 kg
U23 World Championships
Gold medal – first place	2023 Tirana	125 kg
Men's collegiate wrestling
NCAA Division I Championships
Gold medal – first place	2025 Philadelphia	285 lb
Bronze medal – third place	2023 Tulsa	285 lb
Bronze medal – third place	2024 Kansas City	285 lb
Big 12 Championships
Gold medal – first place	2022 Tulsa	285 lb
Gold medal – first place	2023 Tulsa	285 lb
Gold medal – first place	2025 Tulsa	285 lb
Silver medal – second place	2024 Tulsa	285 lb
Bronze medal – third place	2021 Tulsa	285 lb

Wyatt Hendrickson (born January 13, 2001) is an American wrestler. He currently competes in the Heavyweight division of Real American Freestyle (RAF), where he is the current RAF Heavyweight Champion.

He competed in collegiate wrestling for the Air Force Falcons and Oklahoma State Cowboys. A heavyweight, he won the 2025 NCAA national championship, defeating Gable Steveson in a major upset. He was also the recipient of the 2025 Dan Hodge Trophy. Hendrickson represented the US at the 2025 World Wrestling Championships.

== Biography ==
Hendrickson is from Newton, Kansas. He competed in wrestling while attending Newton High School, where he was a four-time All-American in the freestyle and Greco-Roman styles and won a Kansas state championship twice. He was ranked the number three recruit in his weight class nationally and after graduating, enrolled at the United States Air Force Academy. He had received offers to join numerous collegiate wrestling teams and initially threw a letter from Air Force away, before being convinced by his father to enroll there.

As a freshman at Air Force in 2020–21, Hendrickson compiled a record of 16–5 and qualified for the NCAA Championships. He then was the national pins leader as a sophomore and won the Big 12 Conference championship, compiling a record of 26–2 while returning to the NCAA Championships. He won another Big 12 title in the 2022–23 season and finished third at the NCAA Championships, having compiled a record of 31–2 during the season. He was an All-American, the first from Air Force in 20 years. As a senior in 2023–24, he repeated as the third-place finisher at the NCAA Championships. In his career with the Air Force Falcons, Hendrickson went 103–11 while being a two-time All-American.

With an extra year of eligibility due to the COVID-19 pandemic, Hendrickson was selected for the World Class Athlete Program at Air Force, allowing him to delay his military service to continue his career. He transferred to the Oklahoma State Cowboys for his final season of collegiate wrestling since military academies do not allow graduate students to compete. He compiled an undefeated record of 27–0 during the 2024–25 season, qualifying for the NCAA Championships. There, he advanced to the finals and defeated Gable Steveson, an Olympic gold medalist who had won 70-consecutive matches, with a takedown in the final seconds. The commentators for the match described Hendrickson's win as the "biggest upset in NCAA history". He celebrated his win with President Donald Trump, who was in attendance. With the win, he became the 145th national champion from Oklahoma State and third wrestler from the university to win the Hodge, narrowly winning one of the most competitive Dan Hodge Trophy votes in history.

He won the 2026 US Open at 125 kg, qualifying him for Final X in June.

Hendrickson holds the rank of second lieutenant in the United States Air Force.

== Freestyle record ==
Senior Freestyle Matches
Res.	Record	Opponent	Score	Date	Event	Location
2026 Pan American Championships (gold) at 125 kg
Win	36-11	(Canada) Jorawar Dhinsa	Fall	May 10, 2026	2026 Pan American Wrestling Championships	(United States) Coralville, Iowa
Win	35-11	(Brazil) Gabriel Silva	TF 10-0	May 10, 2026	2026 Pan American Wrestling Championships	(United States) Coralville, Iowa
Win	34-11	(Mexico) Brandon Anguiano	Fall	May 10, 2026	2026 Pan American Wrestling Championships	(United States) Coralville, Iowa
2026 US Open (gold) at 125 kg
Win	33–11	(United States) Demetrius Thomas	Fall	April 24–25, 2026	2026 US Open National Championships	(United States) Las Vegas, Nevada
Win	32–11	(United States) Greg Kerkvliet	TF 11–1	April 24–25, 2026	2026 US Open National Championships	(United States) Las Vegas, Nevada
Win	31–11	(United States) Anthony Cassioppi	TF 12–2	April 24–25, 2026	2026 US Open National Championships	(United States) Las Vegas, Nevada
Win	30–11	(United States) Carter Neves	TF 10–0	April 24–25, 2026	2026 US Open National Championships	(United States) Las Vegas, Nevada
RAF 07 UNL kg (Retained RAF Heavyweight Championship)
Win	29-11	(United States) Trent Hillger	6-2	March 28, 2026	RAF 07	(United States) Tampa, Florida
2026 Muhamet Malo Ranking Series (bronze) at 125 kg
Win	28-11	(Turkey) Hakan Büyükçıngıl	Fall	February 25, 2026	2026 Muhamet Malo Tournament	Tirana, Albania
Loss	27-11	(United States) Mason Parris	TF 3-14	February 25, 2026	2026 Muhamet Malo Tournament	Tirana, Albania
Win	27-10	(Azerbaijan) Giorgi Meshvildishvili	TF 15-4	February 25, 2026	2026 Muhamet Malo Tournament	Tirana, Albania
Win	26-10	(Uzbekistan) Khasanboy Rakhimov	TF 10-0	February 25, 2026	2026 Muhamet Malo Tournament	Tirana, Albania
2026 Grand Prix Zagreb Open (silver) at 125 kg
Loss	25-10	(Bahrain) Shamil Sharipov	Fall	February 5, 2026	2026 Grand Prix Zagreb Open	Zagreb, Croatia
Win	25-9	(Poland) Robert Baran	TF 11-1	February 5, 2026	2026 Grand Prix Zagreb Open	Zagreb, Croatia
Win	24-9	(Iran) Morteza Jan Mohammadzadeh	Fall	February 5, 2026	2026 Grand Prix Zagreb Open	Zagreb, Croatia
RAF 04 UNL kg (Retained RAF Heavyweight Championship)
Win	23-9	(United States) Mason Parris	TF 13-2	December 20, 2025	RAF 04	(United States) Fishers, Indiana
Win	22-9	(France) Levan Lagvilava	TF 16-6	November 29, 2025	Cowboy RTC vs France	(United States) Durant, Oklahoma
2025 World Championships DNP at 125 kg
Loss	21-9	Abdulla Kurbanov	TF 4-14	September 13, 2025	2025 World Championships	Zagreb, Croatia
RAF 01 UNL kg (Won Inaugural RAF Heavyweight Championship)
Win	21-8	(Egypt) Mostafa Elders	TF 14-1	August 30, 2025	RAF 01	(United States) Cleveland, Ohio
2025 US World Team Trials (gold) at 125 kg
Win	20-8	(United States) Trent Hillger	20-14	June 14, 2025	2025 Final X	(United States) Newark, New Jersey
Win	19-8	(United States) Trent Hillger	TF 10–0	June 14, 2025	2025 Final X	(United States) Newark, New Jersey
2025 Pan American Championships (gold) at 125 kg
Win	18-8	(Canada) Richard DesChatelets	Fall	May 11, 2025	2025 Pan American Championships	Monterrey, Mexico
Win	17-8	(Venezuela) Jose Daniel Diaz	TF 11-0	May 11, 2025	2025 Pan American Championships	Monterrey, Mexico
Win	16-8	(Costa Rica) Maxwell Lacey	Fall	May 11, 2025	2025 Pan American Championships	Monterrey, Mexico
2025 US Open (gold) at 125 kg
Win	15-8	(United States) Demetrius Thomas	TF 14-3	April 25–26, 2025	2025 US Open National Championships	(United States) Las Vegas, Nevada
Win	14-8	(United States) Trent Hillger	10-4	April 25–26, 2025	2025 US Open National Championships	(United States) Las Vegas, Nevada
Win	13-8	(United States) Lucas Stoddard	TF 11-0	April 25–26, 2025	2025 US Open National Championships	(United States) Las Vegas, Nevada
Win	12-8	(United States) Devon Dawson	TF 10-0	April 25–26, 2025	2025 US Open National Championships	(United States) Las Vegas, Nevada
2024 US Olympic Trials DNP 125 kg
Loss	11-8	(United States) Greg Kerkvliet	TF 0-11	April 19–20, 2024	2024 US Olympic Trials	(United States) State College, Pennsylvania
Win	11-7	(United States) Gary Traub	TF 16-5	April 19–20, 2024	2024 US Olympic Trials	(United States) State College, Pennsylvania
Loss	10-7	(United States) Dom Bradley	8-12	April 19–20, 2024	2024 US Olympic Trials	(United States) State College, Pennsylvania
2023 U23 World Championships (gold) at 125 kg
Win	10-6	(Turkey) Adil Misirci	TF 13-3	October 23–29, 2023	2023 U23 World Championships	Tirana, Albania
Win	9-6	(Greece) Azamat Khosonov	4-2	October 23–29, 2023	2023 U23 World Championships	Tirana, Albania
Win	8-6	(Moldova) Nicolae Stratulat	TF 14-1	October 23–29, 2023	2023 U23 World Championships	Tirana, Albania
Win	7-6	(Authorised Neutral Athletes) Abdulla Kurbanov	Fall	October 23–29, 2023	2023 U23 World Championships	Tirana, Albania
2023 Senior World Team Trials 4th at 125 kg
Loss	6-6	(United States) Dom Bradley	4-5	May 20, 2023	2023 US Senior World Team Trials	(United States) Colorado Springs, Colorado
Win	6-5	(United States) Ty Walz	6-0	May 20, 2023	2023 US Senior World Team Trials	(United States) Colorado Springs, Colorado
Loss	5-5	(United States) Mason Parris	11-12	May 20, 2023	2023 US Senior World Team Trials	(United States) Colorado Springs, Colorado
Win	5-4	(United States) Demertius Thomas	TF 10-0	May 20, 2023	2023 US Senior World Team Trials	(United States) Colorado Springs, Colorado
2023 US Open 4th at 125 kg
Loss	4-4	(United States) Mason Parris	TF 7-20	April 30, 2023	2023 US Open	(United States) Las Vegas, Nevada
Win	4-3	(United States) Dom Bradley	TF 12-1	April 30, 2023	2023 US Open	(United States) Las Vegas, Nevada
Win		(United States) Ty Walz	FF	April 30, 2023	2023 US Open	(United States) Las Vegas, Nevada
Win	3-3	(United States) Owen Trephan	TF 12-0	April 30, 2023	2023 US Open	(United States) Las Vegas, Nevada
Loss	2-3	(United States) Gable Steveson	TF 12-0	April 30, 2023	2023 US Open	(United States) Las Vegas, Nevada
2022 US Open DNP at 125 kg
Loss	2-2	(United States) Sam Schuyler	6-12	April 27, 2022	2022 US Open	(United States) Las Vegas, Nevada
Loss	2-1	(United States) Hayden Zilmer	5-8	April 27, 2022	2022 US Open	(United States) Las Vegas, Nevada
Win	2-0	(United States) Tate Orndoff	16-11	April 27, 2022	2022 US Open	(United States) Las Vegas, Nevada
Win	1-0	(United States) Ryan Vasbinder	TF 10-0	April 27, 2022	2022 US Open	(United States) Las Vegas, Nevada
