= 2026 World Wrestling Championships – Men's freestyle 125 kg =

Men's freestyle 125 kg at the 2026 World Championships
- Venue: Barys Arena
- Dates: 30–31 October 2026
- Competitors: 30 from 30 nations

Medalists
gold medal	Amir Hossein Zare	Iran
silver medal	Abdulla Kurbanov	Russia
bronze medal	Giorgi Meshvildishvili	Azerbaijan
bronze medal	Wyatt Hendrickson	United States

The men's freestyle 125 kilograms is a competition featured at the 2026 World Wrestling Championships, and was held in Astana, Kazakhstan on 30 and 31 October 2026.

This freestyle wrestling competition consists of a single-elimination tournament, with a repechage used to determine the winner of two bronze medals. The two finalists face off for gold and silver medals. Each wrestler who loses to one of the two finalists moves into the repechage, culminating in a pair of bronze medal matches, featuring the semifinal losers each facing the remaining repechage opponent from their half of the bracket.

== Results ==
Legend

- C — Won by 3 cautions given to the opponent
- F — Won by fall
- WO — Won by walkover

=== Final ===
Final
Abdulla Kurbanov (RUS)	0
Amir Hossein Zare (IRI)	11

=== Top half ===
Round of 32
Batbayaryn Nambardagva (MGL)	4
Dzianis Khramiankou (BLR)	1
Yedige Kassimbek (KAZ)	10
Aleksandre Abramishvili (GEO)	0
Sardorbek Kholmatov (UZB)	2
Hakan Büyükçıngıl (TUR)	13
Vladislav Baitsaev (HUN)	2
José Daniel Díaz (VEN)	2
Abdulla Kurbanov (RUS)	11
Joel Tukai (KEN)	0
Taiki Yamamoto (JPN)	WO
~~Issah Fuseini (GHA)~~
Kim Gwan-uk (KOR)	0
Robert Baran (POL)	4

Round of 16
Giorgi Meshvildishvili (AZE)	10
Batbayaryn Nambardagva (MGL)	0
Yedige Kassimbek (KAZ)	1
Hakan Büyükçıngıl (TUR)	11
Vladislav Baitsaev (HUN)	0
Abdulla Kurbanov (RUS)	7
Taiki Yamamoto (JPN)	1
Robert Baran (POL)	12

Quarterfinals
Giorgi Meshvildishvili (AZE)	10
Hakan Büyükçıngıl (TUR)	1
Abdulla Kurbanov (RUS)	9
Robert Baran (POL)	1

Semifinals
Giorgi Meshvildishvili (AZE)	0
Abdulla Kurbanov (RUS)	5

=== Bottom half ===
Round of 32
Shamil Sharipov (BRN)	0
Wyatt Hendrickson (USA)	11
Gheorghe Erhan (MDA)	2
Buheeerdun (CHN)	11^{F}
Georgi Ivanov (BUL)	4^{F}
Gabriel Silva (BRA)	0
Oussama Assad (MAR)	0
Mohsen Siyar (GER)	11
Jonovan Smith (PUR)	2
Karanveer Mahil (CAN)	2
Aaron Johnson (JAM)	4
Yurii Idzinskyi (UKR)	4
Jaspooran Singh (IND)	8
Omar Sarem (ROU)	4

Round of 16
Wyatt Hendrickson (USA)	11
Buheeerdun (CHN)	1
Georgi Ivanov (BUL)	5
Mohsen Siyar (GER)	5^{F}
Jonovan Smith (PUR)	1
Aaron Johnson (JAM)	2
Jaspooran Singh (IND)	0
Amir Hossein Zare (IRI)	11

Quarterfinals
Wyatt Hendrickson (USA)	12
Mohsen Siyar (GER)	2
Aaron Johnson (JAM)	0
Amir Hossein Zare (IRI)	10

Semifinals
Wyatt Hendrickson (USA)	0
Amir Hossein Zare (IRI)	10

=== Repechage ===
Repechage round 1
~~Joel Tukai (KEN)~~
Vladislav Baitsaev (HUN)	WO

Repechage round 2
Vladislav Baitsaev (HUN)	4
Robert Baran (POL)	2
Jaspooran Singh (IND)	10
Aaron Johnson (JAM)	0

Bronze medals
Vladislav Baitsaev (HUN)	0
Giorgi Meshvildishvili (AZE)	10^{C}
Jaspooran Singh (IND)	0
Wyatt Hendrickson (USA)	10

== Final standing ==
Rank	Athlete
1st place, gold medalist(s)	Amir Hossein Zare (IRI)
2nd place, silver medalist(s)	Abdulla Kurbanov (RUS)
3rd place, bronze medalist(s)	Giorgi Meshvildishvili (AZE)
3rd place, bronze medalist(s)	Wyatt Hendrickson (USA)
5	Vladislav Baitsaev (HUN)
5	Jaspooran Singh (IND)
7	Mohsen Siyar (GER)
8	Hakan Büyükçıngıl (TUR)
9	Robert Baran (POL)
10	Buheeerdun (CHN)
11	Aaron Johnson (JAM)
12	Taiki Yamamoto (JPN)
13	Georgi Ivanov (BUL)
14	Yedige Kassimbek (KAZ)
15	Jonovan Smith (PUR)
16	Batbayaryn Nambardagva (MGL)
17	Yurii Idzinskyi (UKR)
18	Omar Sarem (ROU)
19	José Daniel Díaz (VEN)
20	Karanveer Mahil (CAN)
21	Sardorbek Kholmatov (UZB)
22	Dzianis Khramiankou (BLR)
23	Gheorghe Erhan (MDA)
24	Kim Gwan-uk (KOR)
25	Gabriel Silva (BRA)
26	Aleksandre Abramishvili (GEO)
27	Shamil Sharipov (BRN)
28	Oussama Assad (MAR)
—	Joel Tukai (KEN)
—	Issah Fuseini (GHA)
