= 2024 Asian Wrestling Championships – Results =

These are the results of the 2024 Asian Wrestling Championships which took place between 11 and 16 April 2024 in Bishkek, Kyrgyzstan.

== Men's freestyle ==
=== 57 kg ===
11 April

Round of 16
Nodirbek Jumanazarov (UZB)	13
Käbe Mätjanow (TKM)	0
Gayan Ekanayake (SRI)	0
Park Chang-jun (KOR)	5
Kento Yumiya (JPN)	12
Li Weiyu (CHN)	2
Zandanbudyn Zanabazar (MGL)	8
Muhammad Bilal (PAK)	2
Aiaal Belolyubskii (TJK)	2
Kim Kum-hyok (PRK)	4
Ebrahim Khari (IRI)	8
Udit Kumar (IND)	10
Khattab Umer (IRQ)
Almaz Smanbekov (KGZ)	WO

Quarterfinals
Meirambek Kartbay (KAZ)	3
Nodirbek Jumanazarov (UZB)	0
Park Chang-jun (KOR)	1
Kento Yumiya (JPN)	10
Zandanbudyn Zanabazar (MGL)	0
Kim Kum-hyok (PRK)	5
Udit Kumar (IND)	6
Almaz Smanbekov (KGZ)	4

Semifinals
Meirambek Kartbay (KAZ)	2
Kento Yumiya (JPN)	4
Kim Kum-hyok (PRK)	3
Udit Kumar (IND)	4

Final
Kento Yumiya (JPN)	5
Udit Kumar (IND)	4

Repechage round 1
Li Weiyu (CHN)	5
Park Chang-jun (KOR)	2
Ebrahim Khari (IRI)	6
Almaz Smanbekov (KGZ)	4

Bronze medals
Li Weiyu (CHN)	2
Meirambek Kartbay (KAZ)	7
Ebrahim Khari (IRI)	4
Kim Kum-hyok (PRK)	7

=== 61 kg ===
12 April

Round of 16
Ibrahim Guzan (YEM)	0
Ri Kum-chol (PRK)	10
Dzhamshed Sharifov (TJK)	11
Tharindu Priyanath (SRI)	0
Kaisei Tanabe (JPN)	4
Reza Atri (IRI)	4
Assyl Aitakyn (KAZ)	7
Ali Aburumaila (PLE)	0
Enkhbatyn Enkhbold (MGL)	6
Jiang Zhipeng (CHN)	5
Amir Hamaýun (TKM)	1
Son Sang-hyeon (KOR)	2
Sardor Ruzimov (UZB)	8
Akash Dahiya (IND)	10

Quarterfinals
Taiyrbek Zhumashbek Uulu (KGZ)	5
Ri Kum-chol (PRK)	0
Dzhamshed Sharifov (TJK)	0
Reza Atri (IRI)	5
Assyl Aitakyn (KAZ)	11
Enkhbatyn Enkhbold (MGL)	0
Son Sang-hyeon (KOR)	3
Akash Dahiya (IND)	7

Semifinals
Taiyrbek Zhumashbek Uulu (KGZ)	11
Reza Atri (IRI)	7
Assyl Aitakyn (KAZ)	11
Akash Dahiya (IND)	0

Final
Taiyrbek Zhumashbek Uulu (KGZ)	3
Assyl Aitakyn (KAZ)	1

Repechage round 1
Ali Aburumaila (PLE)	0
Enkhbatyn Enkhbold (MGL)	10

Bronze medals
Ri Kum-chol (PRK)	11
Reza Atri (IRI)	0
Enkhbatyn Enkhbold (MGL)	18
Akash Dahiya (IND)	7

=== 65 kg ===
11 April

Round of 16
Rahman Amouzad (IRI)	4
Ulukbek Zholdoshbekov (KGZ)	2
Charles Fernando (SRI)	0
Yoo Seon-ho (KOR)	10
Jelaletdin Seýidow (TKM)	7
Mohammed Al-Jawad (IRQ)	3
Abbos Rakhmonov (UZB)	4
Muhammad Abdullah (PAK)	2
Sanzhar Mukhtar (KAZ)	10
Abdullah Assaf (PLE)	0
Rohit Singh (IND)	11^{F}
Kamol Begakov (TJK)	0
Masanosuke Ono (JPN)	0
Tömör-Ochiryn Tulga (MGL)	4^{F}
Han Hyon-song (PRK)	14
Wei Baowen (CHN)	3

Quarterfinals
Rahman Amouzad (IRI)	7
Yoo Seon-ho (KOR)	0
Jelaletdin Seýidow (TKM)	2
Abbos Rakhmonov (UZB)	12
Sanzhar Mukhtar (KAZ)	1
Rohit Singh (IND)	2^{F}
Tömör-Ochiryn Tulga (MGL)	3
Han Hyon-song (PRK)	0

Semifinals
Rahman Amouzad (IRI)	10
Abbos Rakhmonov (UZB)	0
Rohit Singh (IND)	0
Tömör-Ochiryn Tulga (MGL)	7

Final
Rahman Amouzad (IRI)	2
Tömör-Ochiryn Tulga (MGL)	1

Repechage round 1
Ulukbek Zholdoshbekov (KGZ)	14
Yoo Seon-ho (KOR)	4
Masanosuke Ono (JPN)	10
Han Hyon-song (PRK)	0

Bronze medals
Ulukbek Zholdoshbekov (KGZ)	6
Abbos Rakhmonov (UZB)	4
Masanosuke Ono (JPN)	5
Rohit Singh (IND)	3

=== 70 kg ===
11 April

Round of 16
Zhou Shijian (CHN)	3
Alibek Osmonov (KGZ)	11
Meirzhan Ashirov (KAZ)	6
Perman Hommadow (TKM)	1
Begijon Kuldashev (UZB)	8
Tsermaagiin Chinzorig (MGL)	0
Ursus Lee (SGP)	0
Lee Seung-chul (KOR)	11

Quarterfinals
Amir Mohammad Yazdani (IRI)	9
Alibek Osmonov (KGZ)	4
Meirzhan Ashirov (KAZ)	1
Mustafo Akhmedov (TJK)	5
Yoshinosuke Aoyagi (JPN)	11
Begijon Kuldashev (UZB)	0
Lee Seung-chul (KOR)	0
Abhimanyou Mandwal (IND)	10

Semifinals
Amir Mohammad Yazdani (IRI)	8
Mustafo Akhmedov (TJK)	3
Yoshinosuke Aoyagi (JPN)	10
Abhimanyou Mandwal (IND)	0

Final
Amir Mohammad Yazdani (IRI)	13
Yoshinosuke Aoyagi (JPN)	9

Bronze medals
Alibek Osmonov (KGZ)	3
Mustafo Akhmedov (TJK)	3
Begijon Kuldashev (UZB)	5
Abhimanyou Mandwal (IND)	6

=== 74 kg ===
12 April

Round of 16
Hossein Abouzari (IRI)	10
Zafarbek Otakhonov (UZB)	0
Muhammad Asad Ullah (PAK)	3
So Yong-nam (PRK)	8
Kota Takahashi (JPN)	9
Syrbaz Talgat (KAZ)	9
Li Yi (CHN)	1
Yash Tushir (IND)	6
Viktor Rassadin (TJK)	11
Han Sang-ho (KOR)	0
Kanat Kerimbekov (KGZ)	11
Batsükhiin Batbayar (MGL)	5
Fierre Afan (PHI)	4^{F}
Lakmal Wijesooriya (SRI)	2
Mark Maxwell Peter (SGP)	0
Alp Arslan Begenjow (TKM)	10

Quarterfinals
Hossein Abouzari (IRI)	12
So Yong-nam (PRK)	1
Kota Takahashi (JPN)	11
Yash Tushir (IND)	0
Viktor Rassadin (TJK)	9
Kanat Kerimbekov (KGZ)	0
Fierre Afan (PHI)	0
Alp Arslan Begenjow (TKM)	8^{F}

Semifinals
Hossein Abouzari (IRI)	2
Kota Takahashi (JPN)	4
Viktor Rassadin (TJK)	14
Alp Arslan Begenjow (TKM)	4

Final
Kota Takahashi (JPN)	6
Viktor Rassadin (TJK)	3

Repechage round 1
Syrbaz Talgat (KAZ)	10
Yash Tushir (IND)	0
Han Sang-ho (KOR)	11
Kanat Kerimbekov (KGZ)	4

Bronze medals
Syrbaz Talgat (KAZ)	2
Hossein Abouzari (IRI)	5
Han Sang-ho (KOR)	17
Alp Arslan Begenjow (TKM)	7

- Syrbaz Talgat of Kazakhstan and Alp Arslan Begenjow of Turkmenistan originally finished fifth, but both were disqualified.

=== 79 kg ===
11 April

Round of 16
Gurbanmyrat Öwezberdiýew (TKM)	0
Khidir Saipudinov (BRN)	11
Cao Nan (CHN)	6
Erzo Isakov (JOR)	4
Adilet Maratbaev (KGZ)	5
Magomet Evloev (TJK)	6
Ryunosuke Kamiya (JPN)	3
Parvinder Singh (IND)	0
Enkhbayaryn Byambadorj (MGL)	12^{F}
Azamat Omurzhanov (KAZ)	7
Muhammad Sharif Tahir (PAK)	3
Seo Bum-gue (KOR)	7

Quarterfinals
Mohammad Nokhodi (IRI)	5
Khidir Saipudinov (BRN)	4
Cao Nan (CHN)	3
Magomet Evloev (TJK)	5
Ryunosuke Kamiya (JPN)	3
Enkhbayaryn Byambadorj (MGL)	5
Seo Bum-gue (KOR)	4
Asomiddin Khasanov (UZB)	7

Semifinals
Mohammad Nokhodi (IRI)	11
Magomet Evloev (TJK)	0
Enkhbayaryn Byambadorj (MGL)	10
Asomiddin Khasanov (UZB)	0

Final
Mohammad Nokhodi (IRI)	12
Enkhbayaryn Byambadorj (MGL)	2

Repechage round 1
Azamat Omurzhanov (KAZ)	6
Ryunosuke Kamiya (JPN)	2

Bronze medals
Khidir Saipudinov (BRN)	10
Magomet Evloev (TJK)	2
Azamat Omurzhanov (KAZ)	6
Asomiddin Khasanov (UZB)	9

- Azamat Omurzhanov of Kazakhstan originally finished fifth, but was disqualified.

=== 86 kg ===
12 April

Round of 16
Heng Vuthy (CAM)	0
Hadi Vafaeipour (IRI)	10
Mustafa Abdul-Basit (IRQ)	5
Li Peilong (CHN)	10^{F}
Naadambatyn Batbilgüün (MGL)	8
Lee Gyeong-yeon (KOR)	6
Sandeep Singh Mann (IND)	0
Tatsuya Shirai (JPN)	5

Quarterfinals
Azamat Dauletbekov (KAZ)	3
Hadi Vafaeipour (IRI)	1
Li Peilong (CHN)	6^{F}
Haider Ali Butt (PAK)	0
Atai Izabekov (KGZ)	7
Naadambatyn Batbilgüün (MGL)	4
Tatsuya Shirai (JPN)	1
Javrail Shapiev (UZB)	4

Semifinals
Azamat Dauletbekov (KAZ)	11
Li Peilong (CHN)	0
Atai Izabekov (KGZ)	1
Javrail Shapiev (UZB)	2

Final
Azamat Dauletbekov (KAZ)	5
Javrail Shapiev (UZB)	2

Bronze medals
Hadi Vafaeipour (IRI)	10
Li Peilong (CHN)	0
Tatsuya Shirai (JPN)	3
Atai Izabekov (KGZ)	0

=== 92 kg ===
12 April

Round of 16
Adilet Davlumbayev (KAZ)	6^{F}
Vinay (IND)	0
Satoshi Miura (JPN)	0
Amir Hossein Firouzpour (IRI)	11
Damjingiin Batzul (MGL)	5
Orazmuhammet Hojalyýew (TKM)	0
Issa Abdul-Salam (IRQ)	10
Kim Jin-myeong (KOR)	0

Quarterfinals
Magomed Sharipov (BRN)	7
Adilet Davlumbayev (KAZ)	4
Amir Hossein Firouzpour (IRI)	11
Gangsuhe (CHN)	0
Sherzod Poyonov (UZB)	12
Damjingiin Batzul (MGL)	2
Issa Abdul-Salam (IRQ)	1
Nurtilek Karypbaev (KGZ)	6

Semifinals
Magomed Sharipov (BRN)	0
Amir Hossein Firouzpour (IRI)	10
Sherzod Poyonov (UZB)	5
Nurtilek Karypbaev (KGZ)	3

Final
Amir Hossein Firouzpour (IRI)	8
Sherzod Poyonov (UZB)	3

Repechage round 1
Satoshi Miura (JPN)	2
Gangsuhe (CHN)	10

Bronze medals
Gangsuhe (CHN)	0
Magomed Sharipov (BRN)	10
Damjingiin Batzul (MGL)	2
Nurtilek Karypbaev (KGZ)	2

=== 97 kg ===
11 April

Round of 16
Park Jeong-woo (KOR)	1
Hibiki Ito (JPN)	2
Rizabek Aitmukhan (KAZ)	6
Andrey Aronov (KGZ)	0
Muheite Tuerxunbieke (CHN)	11
Şatlyk Hemelýäýew (TKM)	3

Quarterfinals
Akhmed Tazhudinov (BRN)	10
Hibiki Ito (JPN)	0
Ölziisaikhany Batzul (MGL)	0
Mohammad Hossein Mohammadian (IRI)	10
Makhsud Veysalov (UZB)	0
Rizabek Aitmukhan (KAZ)	11
Muheite Tuerxunbieke (CHN)	6
Vicky Hooda (IND)	9

Semifinals
Akhmed Tazhudinov (BRN)	8
Mohammad Hossein Mohammadian (IRI)	2
Rizabek Aitmukhan (KAZ)	13
Vicky Hooda (IND)	0

Final
Akhmed Tazhudinov (BRN)	4
Rizabek Aitmukhan (KAZ)	2

Repechage round 1
Andrey Aronov (KGZ)	6
Makhsud Veysalov (UZB)	0

Bronze medals
Hibiki Ito (JPN)	0
Mohammad Hossein Mohammadian (IRI)	7
Andrey Aronov (KGZ)	1
Vicky Hooda (IND)	10

=== 125 kg ===
12 April

Round of 16
Zaman Anwar (PAK)	0
Anirudh Gulia (IND)	3
Batkhishigiin Odgerel (MGL)	2
Omar Sarem (SYR)	0
Buheeerdun (CHN)	5
Koki Yamamoto (JPN)	2

Quarterfinals
Amir Hossein Zare (IRI)	10
Anirudh Gulia (IND)	0
Abylay Sovet (KAZ)	0
Shamil Sharipov (BRN)	10
Sardorbek Kholmatov (UZB)	0
Batkhishigiin Odgerel (MGL)	6
Buheeerdun (CHN)	6
Aiaal Lazarev (KGZ)	10

Semifinals
Amir Hossein Zare (IRI)	5
Shamil Sharipov (BRN)	0
Batkhishigiin Odgerel (MGL)	0
Aiaal Lazarev (KGZ)	10

Final
Amir Hossein Zare (IRI)	11
Aiaal Lazarev (KGZ)	0

Bronze medals
Anirudh Gulia (IND)	2
Shamil Sharipov (BRN)	8^{F}
Buheeerdun (CHN)	10
Batkhishigiin Odgerel (MGL)	0

== Men's Greco-Roman ==
=== 55 kg ===
15 April

Round of 16
Nurzat Kabdyrakhimov (KAZ)	8
Kagetora Okamoto (JPN)	7
Huang Baosheng (CHN)	2
Ro Yu-chol (PRK)	10
Alexander Cuevas (SGP)	0
Kim Tae-min (KOR)	9
Arjun Halakurki (IND)	0
Sajjad Ali (IRQ)	8

Quarterfinals
Jasurbek Ortikboev (UZB)	10
Nurzat Kabdyrakhimov (KAZ)	1
Ro Yu-chol (PRK)	10
Ulan Muratbek Uulu (KGZ)	2
Abduwali Rahimbaýew (TKM)	0
Kim Tae-min (KOR)	8
Sajjad Ali (IRQ)	2
Pouya Dadmarz (IRI)	7

Semifinals
Jasurbek Ortikboev (UZB)	1
Ro Yu-chol (PRK)	10
Kim Tae-min (KOR)	2
Pouya Dadmarz (IRI)	3

Final
Ro Yu-chol (PRK)	9
Pouya Dadmarz (IRI)	0

Repechage round 1
Huang Baosheng (CHN)	4
Ulan Muratbek Uulu (KGZ)	10

Bronze medals
Ulan Muratbek Uulu (KGZ)	5
Jasurbek Ortikboev (UZB)	2
Sajjad Ali (IRQ)	9^{F}
Kim Tae-min (KOR)	0

=== 60 kg ===
16 April

Round of 32
Song Hyok (PRK)	8–1 Fall	Ali Abbas (IRQ)

Round of 16
Zholaman Sharshenbekov (KGZ)	11
Suparmanto (INA)	0
Song Hyok (PRK)	3
Ilkhom Bakhromov (UZB)	8
Huang Jui-chi (TPE)	0
Amir Reza Dehbozorgi (IRI)	9
Aslamjon Azizov (TJK)	8
Hassan Al-Harthi (KSA)	0
Kim Seung-hak (KOR)	8
Umit Durdyýew (TKM)	0
Pravesh (IND)	0
Galym Kabdunassarov (KAZ)	9
Kaito Inaba (JPN)	8
Mark Ervin Oliveros (PHI)	0
Tseveenravdangiin Baljinnyam (MGL)	1
Cao Liguo (CHN)	9

Quarterfinals
Zholaman Sharshenbekov (KGZ)	8
Ilkhom Bakhromov (UZB)	0
Amir Reza Dehbozorgi (IRI)	8
Aslamjon Azizov (TJK)	5
Kim Seung-hak (KOR)	0
Galym Kabdunassarov (KAZ)	9
Kaito Inaba (JPN)	11
Cao Liguo (CHN)	1

Semifinals
Zholaman Sharshenbekov (KGZ)	11
Amir Reza Dehbozorgi (IRI)	0
Galym Kabdunassarov (KAZ)	4
Kaito Inaba (JPN)	8

Final
Zholaman Sharshenbekov (KGZ)	11
Kaito Inaba (JPN)	0

Repechage round 2
Suparmanto (INA)	0
Ilkhom Bakhromov (UZB)	11
Mark Ervin Oliveros (PHI)	0
Cao Liguo (CHN)	8

Bronze medals
Ilkhom Bakhromov (UZB)	0
Amir Reza Dehbozorgi (IRI)	9
Cao Liguo (CHN)	7
Galym Kabdunassarov (KAZ)	3

=== 63 kg ===
15 April

Round of 16
Umesh (IND)	0
Karrar Abbas (IRQ)	7
Tan Haodong (CHN)	9
Walid Khaled Hindi (QAT)	0
Dastan Kadyrov (KGZ)	5
Islomjon Bakhromov (UZB)	8
Jung Do-kyung (KOR)	4
Yerzhet Zharlykassyn (KAZ)	6

Quarterfinals
Iman Mohammadi (IRI)	9
Karrar Abbas (IRQ)	0
Tan Haodong (CHN)	0
Ayata Suzuki (JPN)	9
Kim Chan (PRK)	3
Islomjon Bakhromov (UZB)	1
Yerzhet Zharlykassyn (KAZ)	8
Rayan Hawsawi (KSA)	0

Semifinals
Iman Mohammadi (IRI)	4
Ayata Suzuki (JPN)	11
Kim Chan (PRK)	3
Yerzhet Zharlykassyn (KAZ)	5

Final
Ayata Suzuki (JPN)	6
Yerzhet Zharlykassyn (KAZ)	6

Repechage round 1
Jung Do-kyung (KOR)	7
Rayan Hawsawi (KSA)	4

Bronze medals
Tan Haodong (CHN)	0
Iman Mohammadi (IRI)	10
Jung Do-kyung (KOR)	2^{R}
Kim Chan (PRK)	9

=== 67 kg ===
16 April

Round of 16
Haruto Yabe (JPN)	1
Chung Han-jae (KOR)	3
Namsrain Ganbayar (MGL)	0
Razzak Beishekeev (KGZ)	14
Saud Al-Subaie (KSA)	0
Almatbek Amanbek (KAZ)	7^{F}
Son Man-gwang (PRK)	4
Shermukhammad Sharibjanov (UZB)	1
Röwşen Atdaýew (TKM)	8
Muhammad Aliansyah (INA)	4
Firuz Mirzoradzhabov (TJK)	9
Jason Baucas (PHI)	0
Saeid Esmaeili (IRI)	11
Li Lei (CHN)	0

Quarterfinals
Vinayak Patil (IND)	1
Chung Han-jae (KOR)	7
Razzak Beishekeev (KGZ)	7
Almatbek Amanbek (KAZ)	1
Son Man-gwang (PRK)	6
Röwşen Atdaýew (TKM)	9
Firuz Mirzoradzhabov (TJK)	0
Saeid Esmaeili (IRI)	8

Semifinals
Chung Han-jae (KOR)	1
Razzak Beishekeev (KGZ)	2
Röwşen Atdaýew (TKM)	0
Saeid Esmaeili (IRI)	10

Final
Razzak Beishekeev (KGZ)	1
Saeid Esmaeili (IRI)	3

Repechage round 1
Namsrain Ganbayar (MGL)	2
Almatbek Amanbek (KAZ)	4
Li Lei (CHN)	6^{F}
Firuz Mirzoradzhabov (TJK)	4

Bronze medals
Almatbek Amanbek (KAZ)	1
Chung Han-jae (KOR)	1
Li Lei (CHN)	4
Röwşen Atdaýew (TKM)	2

=== 72 kg ===
16 April

Round of 16
Lee Ji-yeon (KOR)	2
Adilkhan Nurlanbekov (KGZ)	4
Leng Ji (CHN)	3
Mohamad Al-Obeid (SYR)	1
Adilkhan Satayev (KAZ)	4^{F}
Ankit Gulia (IND)	0

Quarterfinals
Shingo Harada (JPN)	7
Adilkhan Nurlanbekov (KGZ)	2
Abdullo Aliev (UZB)	9
Begmyrat Nobatow (TKM)	0
Mohammad Reza Rostami (IRI)	5
Leng Ji (CHN)	3
Adilkhan Satayev (KAZ)	4^{F}
Ahmed Barahmah (KSA)	0

Semifinals
Shingo Harada (JPN)	9
Abdullo Aliev (UZB)	2
Mohammad Reza Rostami (IRI)	10
Adilkhan Satayev (KAZ)	0

Final
Shingo Harada (JPN)	9
Mohammad Reza Rostami (IRI)	5

Bronze medals
Adilkhan Nurlanbekov (KGZ)	2
Abdullo Aliev (UZB)	2
Leng Ji (CHN)	4
Adilkhan Satayev (KAZ)	2

=== 77 kg ===
15 April

Round of 16
Enkhtuyaagiin Temüülen (MGL)	0
Ibragim Magomadov (KAZ)	7
Amir Abdi (IRI)	9
Ali Mohammed (IRQ)	0
Gadiel Raid (SGP)	0
Sajan Bhanwal (IND)	9
Noh Yeong-hun (KOR)	9
Chen Tongyu (CHN)	0
Doniyorkhon Nakibov (UZB)	9
Bazargeldi Ezimow (TKM)	0

Quarterfinals
Akzhol Makhmudov (KGZ)	3
Ibragim Magomadov (KAZ)	3
Amir Abdi (IRI)	8
Sajan Bhanwal (IND)	0
Yao Lai-hsing (TPE)	6
Noh Yeong-hun (KOR)	11
Doniyorkhon Nakibov (UZB)	0
Nao Kusaka (JPN)	10

Semifinals
Akzhol Makhmudov (KGZ)	12
Amir Abdi (IRI)	2
Noh Yeong-hun (KOR)	4
Nao Kusaka (JPN)	13

Final
Akzhol Makhmudov (KGZ)	2
Nao Kusaka (JPN)	4

Bronze medals
Ibragim Magomadov (KAZ)	4
Amir Abdi (IRI)	3
Doniyorkhon Nakibov (UZB)	8
Noh Yeong-hun (KOR)	3

=== 82 kg ===
16 April

Round of 16
Sultan Ali Eid (JOR)	5
Yevgeniy Polivadov (KAZ)	1

Quarterfinals
Mukhammadkodir Rasulov (UZB)	9
Sultan Ali Eid (JOR)	0
Rohit Dahiya (IND)	2
Taizo Yoshida (JPN)	7
Bekzat Orunkul Uulu (KGZ)	8
Aryan Azman (SGP)	0
Rasoul Garmsiri (IRI)	8
Yang Se-jin (KOR)	0

Semifinals
Mukhammadkodir Rasulov (UZB)	2
Taizo Yoshida (JPN)	9
Bekzat Orunkul Uulu (KGZ)	7
Rasoul Garmsiri (IRI)	7

Final
Taizo Yoshida (JPN)	9
Rasoul Garmsiri (IRI)	0

Bronze medals
Rohit Dahiya (IND)	1
Mukhammadkodir Rasulov (UZB)	3
Yang Se-jin (KOR)	1
Bekzat Orunkul Uulu (KGZ)	3

=== 87 kg ===
15 April

Round of 16
Lee Seung-hwan (KOR)	7
Ajay (IND)	0
Yhlas Abdurazakow (TKM)	0
Masato Sumi (JPN)	9
Atabek Azisbekov (KGZ)	9
Ganboldyn Törbold (MGL)	0

Quarterfinals
Nursultan Tursynov (KAZ)	9
Lee Seung-hwan (KOR)	0
Rahimjon Uzokov (UZB)	10
Sukhrob Abdulkhaev (TJK)	2
Wang Chengwu (CHN)	0
Masato Sumi (JPN)	5
Atabek Azisbekov (KGZ)	1
Nasser Alizadeh (IRI)	8

Semifinals
Nursultan Tursynov (KAZ)	9
Rahimjon Uzokov (UZB)	0
Masato Sumi (JPN)	1
Nasser Alizadeh (IRI)	1

Final
Nursultan Tursynov (KAZ)	0
Nasser Alizadeh (IRI)	5

Bronze medals
Lee Seung-hwan (KOR)	0
Rahimjon Uzokov (UZB)	6
Atabek Azisbekov (KGZ)	3
Masato Sumi (JPN)	7

=== 97 kg ===
16 April

Round of 16
Abdikodir Jalilov (UZB)	1
Baltmönkhiin Badamdorj (MGL)	4
Iussuf Matsiyev (KAZ)	9
Amanberdi Agamämmedow (TKM)	1

Quarterfinals
Mohammad Hadi Saravi (IRI)	9
Baltmönkhiin Badamdorj (MGL)	0
Mirzoamin Safarov (TJK)	0
Kwon Jeong-yul (KOR)	10
Hao Houzhi (CHN)	5^{F}
Masayuki Amano (JPN)	3
Iussuf Matsiyev (KAZ)	11^{F}
Beksultan Makhmudov (KGZ)	4

Semifinals
Mohammad Hadi Saravi (IRI)	8
Kwon Jeong-yul (KOR)	0
Hao Houzhi (CHN)	0
Iussuf Matsiyev (KAZ)	8

Final
Mohammad Hadi Saravi (IRI)	9
Iussuf Matsiyev (KAZ)	0

Repechage round 1
Amanberdi Agamämmedow (TKM)	0
Beksultan Makhmudov (KGZ)	9

Bronze medals
Baltmönkhiin Badamdorj (MGL)	2
Kwon Jeong-yul (KOR)	2
Beksultan Makhmudov (KGZ)	3
Hao Houzhi (CHN)	5

=== 130 kg ===
15 April

Round of 16
Islomjon Rakhmatov (UZB)	3
Mehar Singh (IND)	2
Mansur Shadukayev (KAZ)	5
Aýbegşazada Kürräýew (TKM)	2
Eduard Babenoshev (TJK)	9^{R}
Buyantogtokhyn Ganzolboo (MGL)	8
Keita Kobayashi (JPN)	3
Ali Yaseen (IRQ)	12

Quarterfinals
Amin Mirzazadeh (IRI)	8
Islomjon Rakhmatov (UZB)	0
Mansur Shadukayev (KAZ)	1
Erlan Manatbekov (KGZ)	9^{F}
Kim Min-seok (KOR)	5
Buyantogtokhyn Ganzolboo (MGL)	1
Ali Yaseen (IRQ)	0
Meng Lingzhe (CHN)	6

Semifinals
Amin Mirzazadeh (IRI)	9
Erlan Manatbekov (KGZ)	0
Kim Min-seok (KOR)	1
Meng Lingzhe (CHN)	1

Final
Amin Mirzazadeh (IRI)	5
Kim Min-seok (KOR)	0

Bronze medals
Islomjon Rakhmatov (UZB)	0
Erlan Manatbekov (KGZ)	3
Buyantogtokhyn Ganzolboo (MGL)	0
Meng Lingzhe (CHN)	8

== Women's freestyle ==
=== 50 kg ===
13 April

Round of 16
Hwang Yong-ok (PRK)	6
Jasmina Immaeva (UZB)	0
Nipuni Wasana (SRI)	0
Nguyễn Thị Xuân (VIE)	5
Jiah Pingot (PHI)	1
Kwon Mi-seon (KOR)	11
Shivani Pawar (IND)	8^{F}
Dit Samnang (CAM)	6
Li Ciao-yun (TPE)	0
Irina Zhanibekova (KAZ)	8^{F}

Quarterfinals
Yui Susaki (JPN)	4
Hwang Yong-ok (PRK)	1
Nguyễn Thị Xuân (VIE)	6^{F}
Kwon Mi-seon (KOR)	0
Feng Ziqi (CHN)	4^{F}
Shivani Pawar (IND)	0
Irina Zhanibekova (KAZ)	5
Dolgorjavyn Otgonjargal (MGL)	12

Semifinals
Yui Susaki (JPN)	10
Nguyễn Thị Xuân (VIE)	0
Feng Ziqi (CHN)	11
Dolgorjavyn Otgonjargal (MGL)	0

Final
Yui Susaki (JPN)	8
Feng Ziqi (CHN)	4

Bronze medals
Hwang Yong-ok (PRK)	4
Nguyễn Thị Xuân (VIE)	2
Shivani Pawar (IND)	9
Dolgorjavyn Otgonjargal (MGL)	7

=== 53 kg ===
14 April

Round of 16
Chinboldyn Otgontuyaa (MGL)	0
Kim Ji-hyang (PRK)	10
Chen Yi-jing (TPE)	10^{F}
Min Ye-ji (KOR)	0
Nguyễn Thị Mỹ Trang (VIE)	4^{F}
Laçyn Annamyradowa (TKM)	0
Nagisa Harada (JPN)	0
Lei Chun (CHN)	4
Vatansulton Shakarshoeva (TJK)	3
Aizhan Sabyrbek Kyzy (KGZ)	5
Aliah Rose Gavalez (PHI)	1
Anju Kumari (IND)	12
Nethmi Ahinsa (SRI)	12
Ayazhan Markasheva (KAZ)	1

Quarterfinals
Dilshoda Matnazarova (UZB)	2
Kim Ji-hyang (PRK)	12
Chen Yi-jing (TPE)	1
Nguyễn Thị Mỹ Trang (VIE)	4
Lei Chun (CHN)	10
Aizhan Sabyrbek Kyzy (KGZ)	0
Anju Kumari (IND)	14
Nethmi Ahinsa (SRI)	4

Semifinals
Kim Ji-hyang (PRK)	8^{F}
Nguyễn Thị Mỹ Trang (VIE)	0
Lei Chun (CHN)	6
Anju Kumari (IND)	9

Final
Kim Ji-hyang (PRK)	10
Anju Kumari (IND)	0

Repechage round 1
Chinboldyn Otgontuyaa (MGL)	10
Dilshoda Matnazarova (UZB)	0
Aliah Rose Gavalez (PHI)	1
Nethmi Ahinsa (SRI)	12

Bronze medals
Chinboldyn Otgontuyaa (MGL)	4^{F}
Nguyễn Thị Mỹ Trang (VIE)	0
Nethmi Ahinsa (SRI)	0
Lei Chun (CHN)	2

=== 55 kg ===
13 April

Round of 16
Tamanna (IND)	0
Moe Kiyooka (JPN)	9
Lee Jung-eun (KOR)	10^{F}
Madina Aripowa (TKM)	1

Quarterfinals
Zhang Min (CHN)	1
Moe Kiyooka (JPN)	5
Madina Usmonjonova (UZB)	0
Bolormaagiin Dölgöön (MGL)	4
Aruuke Kadyrbek Kyzy (KGZ)	0
Oh Kyong-ryong (PRK)	10
Lee Jung-eun (KOR)	0
Zulfiya Yakhyarova (KAZ)	8^{F}

Semifinals
Moe Kiyooka (JPN)	10
Bolormaagiin Dölgöön (MGL)	0
Oh Kyong-ryong (PRK)	11
Zulfiya Yakhyarova (KAZ)	0

Final
Moe Kiyooka (JPN)	7
Oh Kyong-ryong (PRK)	0

Repechage round 1
Tamanna (IND)	0
Zhang Min (CHN)	4

Bronze medals
Zhang Min (CHN)	15
Bolormaagiin Dölgöön (MGL)	5
Aruuke Kadyrbek Kyzy (KGZ)	5
Zulfiya Yakhyarova (KAZ)	3

=== 57 kg ===
14 April

Round of 16
Ulmeken Esenbaeva (UZB)	4
Sezim Zhumanazarova (KGZ)	10

Quarterfinals
Tsugumi Sakurai (JPN)	10
Sezim Zhumanazarova (KGZ)	0
Kim Bo-gyeong (KOR)	0
Laura Almaganbetova (KAZ)	8^{F}
Sarita Mor (IND)	4
Enkhbatyn Gantuyaa (MGL)	8
Yun Hyon-ju (PRK)	0
Feng Yongxin (CHN)	10

Semifinals
Tsugumi Sakurai (JPN)	11^{F}
Laura Almaganbetova (KAZ)	0
Enkhbatyn Gantuyaa (MGL)	0
Feng Yongxin (CHN)	10

Final
Tsugumi Sakurai (JPN)	2
Feng Yongxin (CHN)	5

Bronze medals
Sezim Zhumanazarova (KGZ)	0
Laura Almaganbetova (KAZ)	4^{F}
Yun Hyon-ju (PRK)	12
Enkhbatyn Gantuyaa (MGL)	1

=== 59 kg ===
13 April

Quarterfinals		Semifinals		Final
Zhang Qi (CHN)	1
Risako Kinjo (JPN)	1	Zhang Qi (CHN)	10
Tancholpon Kybalbekova (KGZ)	5	Dilfuza Aimbetova (UZB)	0
Dilfuza Aimbetova (UZB)	7			Zhang Qi (CHN)	10
Pushpa Yadav (IND)	3			Batkhuyagiin Anudari (MGL)	0
Batkhuyagiin Anudari (MGL)	8^{F}	Batkhuyagiin Anudari (MGL)	14
Jeong Eun-su (KOR)		Diana Kayumova (KAZ)	3
Diana Kayumova (KAZ)	WO

Bronze medals
Risako Kinjo (JPN)	13
Dilfuza Aimbetova (UZB)	2
Pushpa Yadav (IND)	8
Diana Kayumova (KAZ)	11

=== 62 kg ===
14 April

Round of 16
Tynys Dubek (KAZ)	1
Jo Su-been (KOR)	9^{F}
Miyasar Kushmuratova (UZB)	2
Arian Carpio (PHI)	6

Quarterfinals
Aisuluu Tynybekova (KGZ)	6^{F}
Jo Su-been (KOR)	0
Sükheegiin Tserenchimed (MGL)	5
Lili (CHN)	0
Manisha Bhanwala (IND)	14^{C}
Choe Su-gyong (PRK)	13
Arian Carpio (PHI)	0
Sakura Motoki (JPN)	10

Semifinals
Aisuluu Tynybekova (KGZ)	13
Sükheegiin Tserenchimed (MGL)	3
Manisha Bhanwala (IND)	0
Sakura Motoki (JPN)	3^{F}

Final
Aisuluu Tynybekova (KGZ)	9
Sakura Motoki (JPN)	6

Bronze medals
Jo Su-been (KOR)	0
Sükheegiin Tserenchimed (MGL)	4^{F}
Arian Carpio (PHI)	0
Manisha Bhanwala (IND)	5^{F}

=== 65 kg ===
14 April

Round of 16
Dilnaz Sazanova (KGZ)	12
Naziýa Joraýewa (TKM)	0

Quarterfinals
Antim Kundu (IND)	11
Dilnaz Sazanova (KGZ)	0
Mahiro Yoshitake (JPN)	0
Kim Soo-bin (KOR)	0^{R}
Tüvshinjargalyn Enkhjin (MGL)	6
Wu Yaru (CHN)	4
Dinora Rustamova (UZB)	3
Irina Kazyulina (KAZ)	4

Semifinals
Antim Kundu (IND)	0
Mahiro Yoshitake (JPN)	6^{F}
Tüvshinjargalyn Enkhjin (MGL)	6
Irina Kazyulina (KAZ)	4

Final
Mahiro Yoshitake (JPN)	7^{F}
Tüvshinjargalyn Enkhjin (MGL)	0

Bronze medals
Kim Soo-bin (KOR)
Antim Kundu (IND)	WO
Wu Yaru (CHN)	10^{F}
Irina Kazyulina (KAZ)	2

=== 68 kg ===
13 April

Round of 16
Park Hyeon-yeong (KOR)	4^{F}
Ariukhan Jumabaeva (UZB)	1

Quarterfinals
Enkhsaikhany Delgermaa (MGL)	4^{F}
Park Hyeon-yeong (KOR)	0
Nonoka Ozaki (JPN)	10
Li Zelu (CHN)	0
Ri Po-gyong (PRK)	6
Gulnura Tashtanbekova (KGZ)	5^{F}
Albina Kairgeldinova (KAZ)	2
Radhika Jaglan (IND)	12

Semifinals
Enkhsaikhany Delgermaa (MGL)	0
Nonoka Ozaki (JPN)	10
Gulnura Tashtanbekova (KGZ)	0
Radhika Jaglan (IND)	2^{F}

Final
Nonoka Ozaki (JPN)	15
Radhika Jaglan (IND)	2

Bronze medals
Li Zelu (CHN)	1
Enkhsaikhany Delgermaa (MGL)	2
Albina Kairgeldinova (KAZ)	2
Gulnura Tashtanbekova (KGZ)	7^{F}

=== 72 kg ===
14 April

Round of 16
Oguljan Egemberdiýewa (TKM)	0
Jiang Qian (CHN)	4^{F}

Quarterfinals
Nurzat Nurtaeva (KGZ)	8
Jiang Qian (CHN)	10
Zorigtyn Bolortungalag (MGL)	10
Sumire Niikura (JPN)	6
Ozoda Zaripboeva (UZB)	3
Harshita Mor (IND)	13
Anastassiya Panassovich (KAZ)	3
Lee Ji-seon (KOR)	2

Semifinals
Jiang Qian (CHN)	8^{F}
Zorigtyn Bolortungalag (MGL)	2
Harshita Mor (IND)	5
Anastassiya Panassovich (KAZ)	0

Final
Jiang Qian (CHN)	5
Harshita Mor (IND)	2

Repechage round 1
~~Oguljan Egemberdiýewa (TKM)~~
Nurzat Nurtaeva (KGZ)	WO

Bronze medals
Nurzat Nurtaeva (KGZ)	0
Zorigtyn Bolortungalag (MGL)	7^{F}
Ozoda Zaripboeva (UZB)	0
Anastassiya Panassovich (KAZ)	10

=== 76 kg ===
13 April

Round of 16
Priya Malik (IND)	10
Valentina Toreniyazova (UZB)	0

Quarterfinals
Aiperi Medet Kyzy (KGZ)	3
Priya Malik (IND)	1
Elmira Syzdykova (KAZ)	4^{F}
Jeong Seo-yeon (KOR)	0
Naigalsürengiin Zagardulam (MGL)	4
Yasuha Matsuyuki (JPN)	4
Chang Hui-tsz (TPE)	0
Huang Yuanyuan (CHN)	2

Semifinals
Aiperi Medet Kyzy (KGZ)	5
Elmira Syzdykova (KAZ)	1
Yasuha Matsuyuki (JPN)	0
Huang Yuanyuan (CHN)	4

Final
Aiperi Medet Kyzy (KGZ)	10
Huang Yuanyuan (CHN)	7

Bronze medals
Priya Malik (IND)	4
Elmira Syzdykova (KAZ)	2^{F}
Chang Hui-tsz (TPE)	8
Yasuha Matsuyuki (JPN)	6
