= Wrestling at the 2022 Asian Games – Men's freestyle 125 kg =

Men's freestyle 125 kg at the 2022 Asian Games
- Venue: Lin'an Sports and Culture Centre
- Date: 7 October 2023
- Competitors: 15 from 15 nations

Medalists
gold medal	Amir Hossein Zare	Iran
silver medal	Mönkhtöriin Lkhagvagerel	Mongolia
bronze medal	Aiaal Lazarev	Kyrgyzstan
bronze medal	Buheeerdun	China

The men's 125 kilograms freestyle wrestling competition at the 2022 Asian Games was held on 7 October 2023 at the Lin'an Sports and Culture Centre in Hangzhou. The event was competed by 15 competitors from 15 nations. Amir Hossein Zare of Iran won the gold medal after defeating Mönkhtöriin Lkhagvagerel of Mongolia in the final. Aiaal Lazarev of Kyrgyzstan and Buheeerdun of China won the bronze medals.

== Background ==
Men's freestyle wrestling was first contested at the 1954 Asian Games in Manila. It has been contested at every edition of the Asian Games since then.

Iran's Parviz Hadi was the defending champion, having won the gold medal in the same weight category at the 2018 Asian Games in Jakarta. China's Deng Zhiwei won the silver medal, while South Korea's Nam Kyung-jin and Uzbekistan's Davit Modzmanashvili won the bronze medals. None of the medalists from the previous Asian Games returned to compete in the 2022 Asian Games.

Iran's Amir Hossein Zare was a bronze medalist from the 2020 Summer Olympics. He also won a gold medal in the 2023 World Wrestling Championships and a bronze medal in the 2021 World Wrestling Championships. Mongolia's Mönkhtöriin Lkhagvagerel was a silver medalist at the 2022 World Wrestling Championships and had also won the bronze medal at the 2021 World Wrestling Championships. He had also won the 2023 Asian Wrestling Championships in Astana defeating Kazakhstan's Yusup Batirmurzaev in teh final. Batirmurzaev had previously won a gold medal at the 2021 Asian Wrestling Championships.

Other competitors included China's Buheeerdun, who was the bronze medallist in the 125 kg category at the 2023 Asian Wrestling Championships, Kyrgyzstan's Aiaal Lazarev, who was a silver medalist in the 2021 Asian Wrestling Championships, and Uzbekistan's Khasanboy Rakhimov, who was a multiple medalist in the Asian Junior Wrestling Championships.

== Format ==
The freestyle wrestling competition was competed as a single-elimination tournament. The two finalists competed against each other for the gold and silver medals. Each wrestler who loses to one of the two finalists moves into the repechage rounds, which is used to determine the bronze medals. The losers of the semifinals compete against the remaining repechage opponent from their half of the bracket in the bronze medal bout.

== Schedule ==
The men's freestyle 125 kg event was held on 7 October 2023 held at the Lin'an Sports and Culture Centre in Hangzhou.

All times are China Standard Time (UTC+08:00)

Date	Time	Event
Saturday, 7 October 2023	10:00	1/8 finals
Saturday, 7 October 2023	10:00	1/4 finals
Saturday, 7 October 2023	10:00	Semifinals
Saturday, 7 October 2023	10:00	Repechages
Saturday, 7 October 2023	17:00	Finals

== Summary ==
The event was competed by 15 competitors from 15 nations. Zare defeated Zaman Anwar and Buheeerdun in his first two rounds by technical superiority to advance to the semifinals. In the semifinas, he defeated Batirmurzaev 11–0 by technical superiority to qualify for the finals. The other finalist, Lkhagvagerel, received a bye in the opening round before defeating Lazarev 6–0 in the quarterfinals to reach the semifinals. In the semifinals, he defeated Rakhimov by a fall to qualify for the final against Zare.

In the final, Zare defeated Lkhagvagerel by a score of 7–0 to win the gold medal. He first forced a step-out before scoring two takedowns to score the points. Lazarev and Buheeerdun won the bronze medals. Lazarev defeated Rakhimov 7–6 in his bronze-medal bout while Buheeerdun defeated Batirmurzaev 5–2 to win the other bronze medal. Initially, Rakhimov led 6-3 before Lazarev scored a takedown and turned Rakhimov to score four points and win the match.

== Results ==
Legend

- F — Won by fall

=== Main bracket ===
1/8 finals
Aiaal Lazarev (KGZ)	10
Sumit Malik (IND)	0
Taiki Yamamoto (JPN)	7
Omar Sarem (SYR)	5
Jung Yei-hyun (KOR)	0
Khasanboy Rakhimov (UZB)	9
Raj Yadav (NEP)	0
Sou Bali (CAM)	10
Yusup Batirmurzaev (KAZ)	10
Farkhod Anakulov (TJK)	0
Zaman Anwar (PAK)	0
Amir Hossein Zare (IRI)	10
Zyýamuhammet Saparow (TKM)	4
Buheeerdun (CHN)	8

1/4 finals
Mönkhtöriin Lkhagvagerel (MGL)	6
Aiaal Lazarev (KGZ)	0
Taiki Yamamoto (JPN)	0
Khasanboy Rakhimov (UZB)	5
Sou Bali (CAM)	2
Yusup Batirmurzaev (KAZ)	5
Amir Hossein Zare (IRI)	10
Buheeerdun (CHN)	0

Semifinals
Mönkhtöriin Lkhagvagerel (MGL)	2^{F}
Khasanboy Rakhimov (UZB)	0
Yusup Batirmurzaev (KAZ)	0
Amir Hossein Zare (IRI)	11

Gold medal match
Mönkhtöriin Lkhagvagerel (MGL)	0
Amir Hossein Zare (IRI)	7

=== Repechage ===
Repechage round 1
Zaman Anwar (PAK)	2
Buheeerdun (CHN)	3

Bronze medal matches
Aiaal Lazarev (KGZ)	7
Khasanboy Rakhimov (UZB)	6
Buheeerdun (CHN)	5^{F}
Yusup Batirmurzaev (KAZ)	3

== Final standing ==
Rank	Athlete
1st place, gold medalist(s)	Amir Hossein Zare (IRI)
2nd place, silver medalist(s)	Mönkhtöriin Lkhagvagerel (MGL)
3rd place, bronze medalist(s)	Aiaal Lazarev (KGZ)
3rd place, bronze medalist(s)	Buheeerdun (CHN)
5	Khasanboy Rakhimov (UZB)
5	Yusup Batirmurzaev (KAZ)
7	Sou Bali (CAM)
8	Taiki Yamamoto (JPN)
9	Omar Sarem (SYR)
10	Zyýamuhammet Saparow (TKM)
11	Zaman Anwar (PAK)
12	Jung Yei-hyun (KOR)
13	Sumit Malik (IND)
14	Raj Yadav (NEP)
15	Farkhod Anakulov (TJK)
