= 2025 World Wrestling Championships – Men's freestyle 125 kg =

Wrestling competitions

Men's freestyle 125 kg at the 2025 World Championships
- Venue: Arena Zagreb
- Dates: 13–14 September 2025
- Competitors: 27 from 25 nations

Medalists
gold medal	Amir Hossein Zare	Iran
silver medal	Giorgi Meshvildishvili	Azerbaijan
bronze medal	Robert Baran	Poland
bronze medal	Shamil Sharipov	Bahrain

The men's freestyle 125 kilograms is a competition featured at the 2025 World Wrestling Championships, and was held in Zagreb, Croatia on 13 and 14 September 2025.

This freestyle wrestling competition consists of a single-elimination tournament, with a repechage used to determine the winner of two bronze medals. The two finalists face off for gold and silver medals. Each wrestler who loses to one of the two finalists moves into the repechage, culminating in a pair of bronze medal matches, featuring the semifinal losers each facing the remaining repechage opponent from their half of the bracket.

== Results ==
Legend

- F — Won by fall
- R — Retired

=== Final ===
Final
Giorgi Meshvildishvili (AZE)	0
Amir Hossein Zare (IRI)	5

=== Top half ===
Round of 32
Murazi Mchedlidze (UKR)	0
Khasanboy Rakhimov (UZB)	4
Alisher Yergali (KAZ)	6
Alen Khubulov (BUL)	10
Rajat Ruhal (IND)	2
Vladislav Baitsaev (HUN)	5
Gabriel Silva (BRA)	2
Mohsen Siyar (GER)	12
Omar Sarem (ROU)	7
Taiki Yamamoto (JPN)	1

Round of 16
Giorgi Meshvildishvili (AZE)	7
Khasanboy Rakhimov (UZB)	0
Alen Khubulov (BUL)	2
Vladislav Baitsaev (HUN)	4
Mönkhtöriin Lkhagvagerel (MGL)	2
Mohsen Siyar (GER)	5
Omar Sarem (ROU)	0
Robert Baran (POL)	10

Quarterfinals
Giorgi Meshvildishvili (AZE)	7
Vladislav Baitsaev (HUN)	0
Mohsen Siyar (GER)	3
Robert Baran (POL)	6

Semifinals
Giorgi Meshvildishvili (AZE)	2
Robert Baran (POL)	0

=== Bottom half ===
Round of 32
Abdulla Kurbanov (UWW)	14
Wyatt Hendrickson (USA)	4
Johannes Ludescher (AUT)	1
Buheeerdun (CHN)	3
Filip Koščić (CRO)	0
Shamil Sharipov (BRN)	11
Solomon Manashvili (GEO)	5
Azamat Khosonov (GRE)	2
Hakan Büyükçıngıl (TUR)	5
Kim Gyeong-min (KOR)	6
Jonovan Smith (PUR)	6
Dmitrii Dușcov (MDA)	1

Round of 16
Dzianis Khramiankou (UWW)	0
Abdulla Kurbanov (UWW)	5
Buheeerdun (CHN)	6
Shamil Sharipov (BRN)	4^{F}
Solomon Manashvili (GEO)	10
Kim Gyeong-min (KOR)	0
Jonovan Smith (PUR)	0
Amir Hossein Zare (IRI)	11

Quarterfinals
Abdulla Kurbanov (UWW)	0
Shamil Sharipov (BRN)	4^{F}
Solomon Manashvili (GEO)	0
Amir Hossein Zare (IRI)	10

Semifinals
Shamil Sharipov (BRN)	3
Amir Hossein Zare (IRI)	7

=== Repechage ===
Repechage round 2
Khasanboy Rakhimov (UZB)	2
Vladislav Baitsaev (HUN)	3
Jonovan Smith (PUR)	2
Solomon Manashvili (GEO)	5^{R}

Bronze medals
Vladislav Baitsaev (HUN)	0
Robert Baran (POL)	5
Jonovan Smith (PUR)	0
Shamil Sharipov (BRN)	5^{F}

== Final standing ==
Rank	Athlete
1st place, gold medalist(s)	Amir Hossein Zare (IRI)
2nd place, silver medalist(s)	Giorgi Meshvildishvili (AZE)
3rd place, bronze medalist(s)	Robert Baran (POL)
3rd place, bronze medalist(s)	Shamil Sharipov (BRN)
5	Vladislav Baitsaev (HUN)
5	Jonovan Smith (PUR)
7	Mohsen Siyar (GER)
8	Solomon Manashvili (GEO)
9	Abdulla Kurbanov (UWW)
10	Alen Khubulov (BUL)
11	Khasanboy Rakhimov (UZB)
12	Buheeerdun (CHN)
13	Omar Sarem (ROU)
14	Kim Gyeong-min (KOR)
15	Alisher Yergali (KAZ)
16	Hakan Büyükçıngıl (TUR)
17	Wyatt Hendrickson (USA)
18	Mönkhtöriin Lkhagvagerel (MGL)
19	Rajat Ruhal (IND)
20	Azamat Khosonov (GRE)
21	Gabriel Silva (BRA)
22	Johannes Ludescher (AUT)
23	Dmitrii Dușcov (MDA)
24	Taiki Yamamoto (JPN)
25	Murazi Mchedlidze (UKR)
26	Dzianis Khramiankou (UWW)
27	Filip Koščić (CRO)
