= Harati High School =

Boys' public high school in Isfahan, Iran

- دبیرستان هراتی
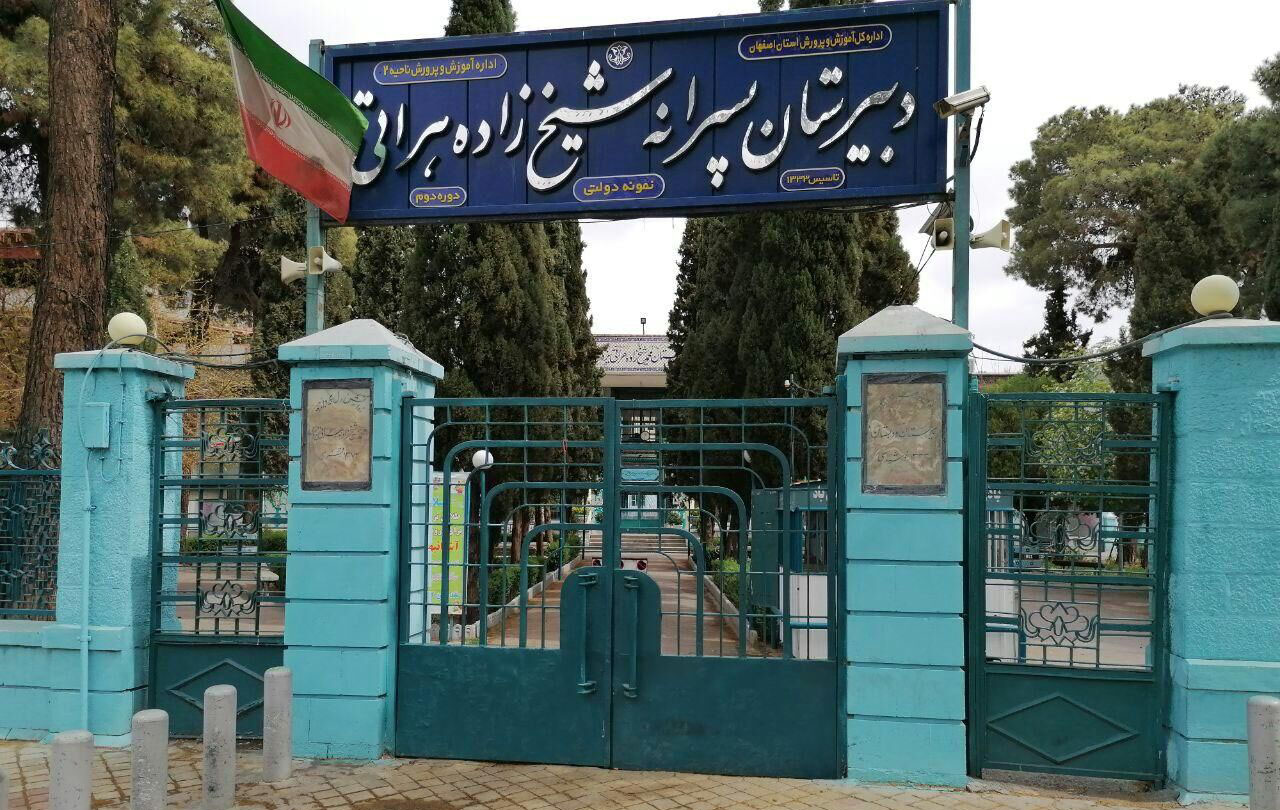

Location
- Kamal Esmaeel Avenue, between Khaju and Si-o-se-pol bridges Isfahan; Iran

Information
- Type: Public; Mandegar (legacy) and Nemooneh (selective)
- Opened: 1954
- Founder: Mohammad Sheikhzadeh Harati Yazdi
- Principal: Mohammad Ali Pourbafarani
- Grades: 10, 11, 12
- Campus size: approx. 8750 m²
- Website: https://www.haratischool.ir/

Harati High School (Persian: دبیرستان هراتی) is a boys' public high school in Isfahan, Iran. It was established more than half a century ago through the initiative and funding of Mohammad Sheikhzadeh Herati Yazdi. The two-storey mid-20th-century campus on Kamal Esmaeel Avenue occupies about approx. 8750 m² near the Zayandeh River and features decorative tilework by master craftsman Mohammad Ali Maghzi; the building is listed on Iran's register of national heritage sites.

== History ==
In 1951, the construction of the primary school and high school began under the initiative of Sheikhzadeh Herati Yazdi in Isfahan. The construction operations spanned three years, and the official inauguration took place in 1954.

In 2015, Harati High School was registered as a "Mandegar" (Persian: ماندگار, meaning: lasting) school by the Provincial and National Council of Education. "Mandegar" schools are old educational establishments or units with a history of at least 50 years, and they are deemed suitable for educational activities in terms of their structural integrity.

Harati High School holds a coveted "Nemooneh" license from the Ministry of Education, indicating its commitment to superior education quality. Governed by the government, Nemooneh high schools, like Harati, admit students through a competitive entrance exam. These institutions focus on nurturing students' talents and abilities, aiming to empower them to reach their full potential.

== Status ==
Harati is designated both a Mandegar (legacy) and Nemooneh (selective) public high school by the Ministry of Education. In 2015 it was reported as the first school in Isfahan Province registered with the Mandegar status; the school is also described as Nemooneh (admission by competitive entrance exam).

== Campus and architecture ==
The two-storey plan aligns east–west along the river; classrooms receive natural southern light, and the façade bears Maghzi's mosaic tilework. The site area is approximately approx. 8750 m² with significant open space compared to typical contemporary schools in Iran.

== Honors and Alumni ==
Every year, a considerable number of students from Harati High School achieve excellent ranks in Khwarizmi Award, national Olympiads, cultural and educational competitions, sports events, and nationwide university entrance exams (known as کنکور).

== See also ==
- Education in Iran
- Isfahan
