= 2020 Individual Wrestling World Cup – Men's freestyle 125 kg =

The men's freestyle 125 kilograms is a competition featured at the 2020 Individual Wrestling World Cup, and was held in Belgrade, Serbia on 16 and 17 December 2020.

== Medalists ==
Gold	Shamil Sharipov; Russia
Silver	Robert Baran; Poland
Bronze	Dzianis Khramiankou; Belarus
Bronze	Aiaal Lazarev; Kyrgyzstan

== Results ==
Legend

- F — Won by fall
- WO — Won by walkover

1/8 finals
Shamil Sharipov (RUS)	WO
~~Paris Karepi (ALB)~~
Oleksandr Khotsianivskyi (UKR)	5
Islam Adizov (BUL)	0
Amar Dhesi (CAN)	8
Aiaal Lazarev (KGZ)	11
Sumit Malik (IND)	2
Egor Olar (MDA)	4
Oktay Güngör (TUR)	2
Jamaladdin Magomedov (AZE)	4
Catriel Muriel (ARG)	1
Robert Baran (POL)	9

Quarterfinals
Dzianis Khramiankou (BLR)	10
Hovhannes Maghakyan (ARM)	0
Shamil Sharipov (RUS)	6
Oleksandr Khotsianivskyi (UKR)	0
Aiaal Lazarev (KGZ)	4^{F}
Egor Olar (MDA)	2
Jamaladdin Magomedov (AZE)	0
Robert Baran (POL)	4

Semifinals
Dzianis Khramiankou (BLR)	2
Shamil Sharipov (RUS)	13
Aiaal Lazarev (KGZ)	0
Robert Baran (POL)	6

Final
Shamil Sharipov (RUS)	4
Robert Baran (POL)	1

Repechage round 1
~~Paris Karepi (ALB)~~
Oleksandr Khotsianivskyi (UKR)	WO
Catriel Muriel (ARG)	0
Jamaladdin Magomedov (AZE)	10

Bronze medals
Oleksandr Khotsianivskyi (UKR)	5
Dzianis Khramiankou (BLR)	6
Jamaladdin Magomedov (AZE)	0
Aiaal Lazarev (KGZ)	11
