= 2024 Asian Wrestling Championships =

- Host city: Bishkek, Kyrgyzstan
- Dates: 11–16 April 2024
- Stadium: Bishkek Arena

Champions
- Freestyle: Iran
- Greco-Roman: Iran
- Women: Japan

The 2024 Asian Wrestling Championships is the 20th edition of Asian Wrestling Championships of combined events, and took place from 11 to 16 April in Bishkek, Kyrgyzstan.

== Medal table ==
Rank	Nation	Gold	Silver	Bronze	Total
1	Japan	9	5	4	18
2	Iran	9	3	5	17
3	Kyrgyzstan	4	3	7	14
4	China	3	2	9	14
5	Kazakhstan	2	4	6	12
6	North Korea	2	1	5	8
7	Bahrain	1	0	3	4
8	Mongolia	0	4	6	10
9	India	0	4	5	9
10	Uzbekistan	0	2	5	7
11	South Korea	0	1	3	4
12	Tajikistan	0	1	0	1
13	Chinese Taipei	0	0	1	1
13	Iraq	0	0	1	1
Totals (14 entries)		30	30	60	120

== Team ranking ==
Rank	Men's freestyle		Men's Greco-Roman		Women's freestyle	
Rank	Team	Points	Team	Points	Team	Points
1	Iran	190	Iran	200	Japan	173
2	Japan	131	Kyrgyzstan	144	China	172
3	Kyrgyzstan	126	Japan	142	Mongolia	138
4	Kazakhstan	98	Kazakhstan	130	India	135
5	Mongolia	96	South Korea	112	Kyrgyzstan	122
6	India	88	Uzbekistan	106	Kazakhstan	102
7	Uzbekistan	85	China	97	North Korea	87
8	Bahrain	70	North Korea	54	South Korea	64
9	China	65	Iraq	31	Uzbekistan	52
10	South Korea	61	Mongolia	28	Chinese Taipei	23

== Medal summary ==
=== Men's freestyle ===
Event	Gold	Silver	Bronze
57 kg	Kento Yumiya; Japan	Udit Kumar; India	Meirambek Kartbay; Kazakhstan
57 kg	Kento Yumiya; Japan	Udit Kumar; India	Kim Kum-hyok; North Korea
61 kg	Taiyrbek Zhumashbek Uulu; Kyrgyzstan	Assyl Aitakyn; Kazakhstan	Ri Kum-chol; North Korea
61 kg	Taiyrbek Zhumashbek Uulu; Kyrgyzstan	Assyl Aitakyn; Kazakhstan	Enkhbatyn Enkhbold; Mongolia
65 kg	Rahman Amouzad; Iran	Tömör-Ochiryn Tulga; Mongolia	Ulukbek Zholdoshbekov; Kyrgyzstan
65 kg	Rahman Amouzad; Iran	Tömör-Ochiryn Tulga; Mongolia	Masanosuke Ono; Japan
70 kg	Amir Mohammad Yazdani; Iran	Yoshinosuke Aoyagi; Japan	Alibek Osmonov; Kyrgyzstan
70 kg	Amir Mohammad Yazdani; Iran	Yoshinosuke Aoyagi; Japan	Abhimanyou Mandwal; India
74 kg	Kota Takahashi; Japan	Viktor Rassadin; Tajikistan	Hossein Abouzari; Iran
74 kg	Kota Takahashi; Japan	Viktor Rassadin; Tajikistan	Han Sang-ho; South Korea
79 kg	Mohammad Nokhodi; Iran	Enkhbayaryn Byambadorj; Mongolia	Khidir Saipudinov; Bahrain
79 kg	Mohammad Nokhodi; Iran	Enkhbayaryn Byambadorj; Mongolia	Asomiddin Khasanov; Uzbekistan
86 kg	Azamat Dauletbekov; Kazakhstan	Javrail Shapiev; Uzbekistan	Hadi Vafaeipour; Iran
86 kg	Azamat Dauletbekov; Kazakhstan	Javrail Shapiev; Uzbekistan	Tatsuya Shirai; Japan
92 kg	Amir Hossein Firouzpour; Iran	Sherzod Poyonov; Uzbekistan	Magomed Sharipov; Bahrain
92 kg	Amir Hossein Firouzpour; Iran	Sherzod Poyonov; Uzbekistan	Damjingiin Batzul; Mongolia
97 kg	Akhmed Tazhudinov; Bahrain	Rizabek Aitmukhan; Kazakhstan	Mohammad Hossein Mohammadian; Iran
97 kg	Akhmed Tazhudinov; Bahrain	Rizabek Aitmukhan; Kazakhstan	Vicky Hooda; India
125 kg	Amir Hossein Zare; Iran	Aiaal Lazarev; Kyrgyzstan	Shamil Sharipov; Bahrain
125 kg	Amir Hossein Zare; Iran	Aiaal Lazarev; Kyrgyzstan	Buheeerdun; China

=== Men's Greco-Roman ===
Event	Gold	Silver	Bronze
55 kg	Ro Yu-chol; North Korea	Pouya Dadmarz; Iran	Ulan Muratbek Uulu; Kyrgyzstan
55 kg	Ro Yu-chol; North Korea	Pouya Dadmarz; Iran	Sajjad Ali; Iraq
60 kg	Zholaman Sharshenbekov; Kyrgyzstan	Kaito Inaba; Japan	Amir Reza Dehbozorgi; Iran
60 kg	Zholaman Sharshenbekov; Kyrgyzstan	Kaito Inaba; Japan	Cao Liguo; China
63 kg	Yerzhet Zharlykassyn; Kazakhstan	Ayata Suzuki; Japan	Iman Mohammadi; Iran
63 kg	Yerzhet Zharlykassyn; Kazakhstan	Ayata Suzuki; Japan	Kim Chan; North Korea
67 kg	Saeid Esmaeili; Iran	Razzak Beishekeev; Kyrgyzstan	Chung Han-jae; South Korea
67 kg	Saeid Esmaeili; Iran	Razzak Beishekeev; Kyrgyzstan	Li Lei; China
72 kg	Shingo Harada; Japan	Mohammad Reza Rostami; Iran	Abdullo Aliev; Uzbekistan
72 kg	Shingo Harada; Japan	Mohammad Reza Rostami; Iran	Leng Ji; China
77 kg	Nao Kusaka; Japan	Akzhol Makhmudov; Kyrgyzstan	Ibragim Magomadov; Kazakhstan
77 kg	Nao Kusaka; Japan	Akzhol Makhmudov; Kyrgyzstan	Doniyorkhon Nakibov; Uzbekistan
82 kg	Taizo Yoshida; Japan	Rasoul Garmsiri; Iran	Mukhammadkodir Rasulov; Uzbekistan
82 kg	Taizo Yoshida; Japan	Rasoul Garmsiri; Iran	Bekzat Orunkul Uulu; Kyrgyzstan
87 kg	Nasser Alizadeh; Iran	Nursultan Tursynov; Kazakhstan	Rahimjon Uzokov; Uzbekistan
87 kg	Nasser Alizadeh; Iran	Nursultan Tursynov; Kazakhstan	Masato Sumi; Japan
97 kg	Mohammad Hadi Saravi; Iran	Iussuf Matsiyev; Kazakhstan	Kwon Jeong-yul; South Korea
97 kg	Mohammad Hadi Saravi; Iran	Iussuf Matsiyev; Kazakhstan	Hao Houzhi; China
130 kg	Amin Mirzazadeh; Iran	Kim Min-seok; South Korea	Erlan Manatbekov; Kyrgyzstan
130 kg	Amin Mirzazadeh; Iran	Kim Min-seok; South Korea	Meng Lingzhe; China

=== Women's freestyle ===
Event	Gold	Silver	Bronze
50 kg	Yui Susaki; Japan	Feng Ziqi; China	Hwang Yong-ok; North Korea
50 kg	Yui Susaki; Japan	Feng Ziqi; China	Shivani Pawar; India
53 kg	Kim Ji-hyang; North Korea	Anju Kumari; India	Chinboldyn Otgontuyaa; Mongolia
53 kg	Kim Ji-hyang; North Korea	Anju Kumari; India	Lei Chun; China
55 kg	Moe Kiyooka; Japan	Oh Kyong-ryong; North Korea	Zhang Min; China
55 kg	Moe Kiyooka; Japan	Oh Kyong-ryong; North Korea	Aruuke Kadyrbek Kyzy; Kyrgyzstan
57 kg	Feng Yongxin; China	Tsugumi Sakurai; Japan	Laura Almaganbetova; Kazakhstan
57 kg	Feng Yongxin; China	Tsugumi Sakurai; Japan	Yun Hyon-ju; North Korea
59 kg	Zhang Qi; China	Batkhuyagiin Anudari; Mongolia	Risako Kinjo; Japan
59 kg	Zhang Qi; China	Batkhuyagiin Anudari; Mongolia	Diana Kayumova; Kazakhstan
62 kg	Aisuluu Tynybekova; Kyrgyzstan	Sakura Motoki; Japan	Sükheegiin Tserenchimed; Mongolia
62 kg	Aisuluu Tynybekova; Kyrgyzstan	Sakura Motoki; Japan	Manisha Bhanwala; India
65 kg	Mahiro Yoshitake; Japan	Tüvshinjargalyn Enkhjin; Mongolia	Antim Kundu; India
65 kg	Mahiro Yoshitake; Japan	Tüvshinjargalyn Enkhjin; Mongolia	Wu Yaru; China
68 kg	Nonoka Ozaki; Japan	Radhika Jaglan; India	Enkhsaikhany Delgermaa; Mongolia
68 kg	Nonoka Ozaki; Japan	Radhika Jaglan; India	Gulnura Tashtanbekova; Kyrgyzstan
72 kg	Jiang Qian; China	Harshita Mor; India	Zorigtyn Bolortungalag; Mongolia
72 kg	Jiang Qian; China	Harshita Mor; India	Anastassiya Panassovich; Kazakhstan
76 kg	Aiperi Medet Kyzy; Kyrgyzstan	Huang Yuanyuan; China	Elmira Syzdykova; Kazakhstan
76 kg	Aiperi Medet Kyzy; Kyrgyzstan	Huang Yuanyuan; China	Chang Hui-tsz; Chinese Taipei

== Participating nations ==
357 competitors from 28 nations competed.

- Bahrain (4)
- Cambodia (2)
- China (29)
- Chinese Taipei (5)
- India (29)
- Indonesia (2)
- Iran (20)
- Iraq (9)
- Japan (30)
- Jordan (2)
- Kazakhstan (30)
- Kyrgyzstan (29)
- Mongolia (26)
- North Korea (14)
- Pakistan (6)
- Palestine (2)
- Philippines (6)
- Qatar (1)
- Saudi Arabia (4)
- Singapore (5)
- South Korea (29)
- Sri Lanka (6)
- Syria (2)
- Tajikistan (12)
- Turkmenistan (20)
- Uzbekistan (30)
- Vietnam (2)
- Yemen (1)
