= 2023 U23 World Wrestling Championships – Men's freestyle 125 kg =

Wrestling competitions

Men's freestyle 125 kg at the 2023 U23 World Championships
- Venue: Tirana Olympic Park
- Dates: 23–24 October
- Competitors: 15 from 12 nations

Medalists
| gold medal | Wyatt Hendrickson | United States |
| silver medal | Adil Mısırcı | Turkey |
| bronze medal | Azamat Khosonov | Greece |
| bronze medal | Vakhit Galayev | Azerbaijan |

The men's freestyle 125 kg competition was held at the 2023 U23 World Wrestling Championships in Tirana, Albania, on 23 and 24 October 2023.

This freestyle wrestling competition consists of a single-elimination tournament, with a repechage used to determine the winner of two bronze medals. The two finalists face off for gold and silver medals. Each wrestler who loses to one of the two finalists moves into the repechage, culminating in a pair of bronze medal matches featuring the semifinal losers each facing the remaining repechage opponent from their half of the bracket.

== Results ==
Legend

- F — Won by fall

=== Main Bracket ===
Round of 16
Azamat Khosonov (GRE) | 9
Solomon Manashvili (GEO) | 0
Nicolae Stratulat (MDA) | 10
Kai Shutto (JPN) | 0
Wyatt Hendrickson (USA) | 17^{F}
Abdulla Kurbanov (ANA) | 9
Adil Mısırcı (TUR) | 9
Aliaksei Parkhomenka (ANA) | 1
Vakhit Galayev (AZE) | 4
Karanveer Mahil (CAN) | 0
Volodymyr Kochanov (UKR) | 12
Khachatur Khachatryan (ARM) | 1
Anirudh Kumar (UWW) | 9
Omarkhan Nadirov (KAZ) | 0

Quarterfinals
Georgi Velev (BUL) | 1
Azamat Khosonov (GRE) | 12
Nicolae Stratulat (MDA) | 1
Wyatt Hendrickson (USA) | 14
Adil Mısırcı (TUR) | 11
Vakhit Galayev (AZE) | 0
Volodymyr Kochanov (UKR) | 1
Anirudh Kumar (UWW) | 11

Semifinals
Azamat Khosonov (GRE) | 2
Wyatt Hendrickson (USA) | 4
Adil Mısırcı (TUR) | 3
Anirudh Kumar (UWW) | 0

Final
Wyatt Hendrickson (USA) | 13
Adil Mısırcı (TUR) | 3

=== Repechage ===
Repechage round 1
Abdulla Kurbanov (ANA) | 11
Nicolae Stratulat (MDA) | 0
Aliaksei Parkhomenka (ANA) | 0
Vakhit Galayev (AZE) | 10

Bronze medals
Abdulla Kurbanov (ANA) | 4
Azamat Khosonov (GRE) | 5
Vakhit Galayev (AZE) | 10
Anirudh Kumar (UWW) | 0

== Final standing ==
| Rank | Athlete |
|---|---|
| 1st place, gold medalist(s) | Wyatt Hendrickson (USA) |
| 2nd place, silver medalist(s) | Adil Mısırcı (TUR) |
| 3rd place, bronze medalist(s) | Azamat Khosonov (GRE) |
| 3rd place, bronze medalist(s) | Vakhit Galayev (AZE) |
| 5 | Abdulla Kurbanov (ANA) |
| 5 | Anirudh Kumar (UWW) |
| 7 | Volodymyr Kochanov (UKR) |
| 8 | Nicolae Stratulat (MDA) |
| 9 | Georgi Velev (BUL) |
| 10 | Khachatur Khachatryan (ARM) |
| 11 | Aliaksei Parkhomenka (ANA) |
| 12 | Karanveer Mahil (CAN) |
| 13 | Solomon Manashvili (GEO) |
| 14 | Omarkhan Nadirov (KAZ) |
| 15 | Kai Shutto (JPN) |
