= Aiaal Lazarev =

Kyrgyzstani freestyle wrestler

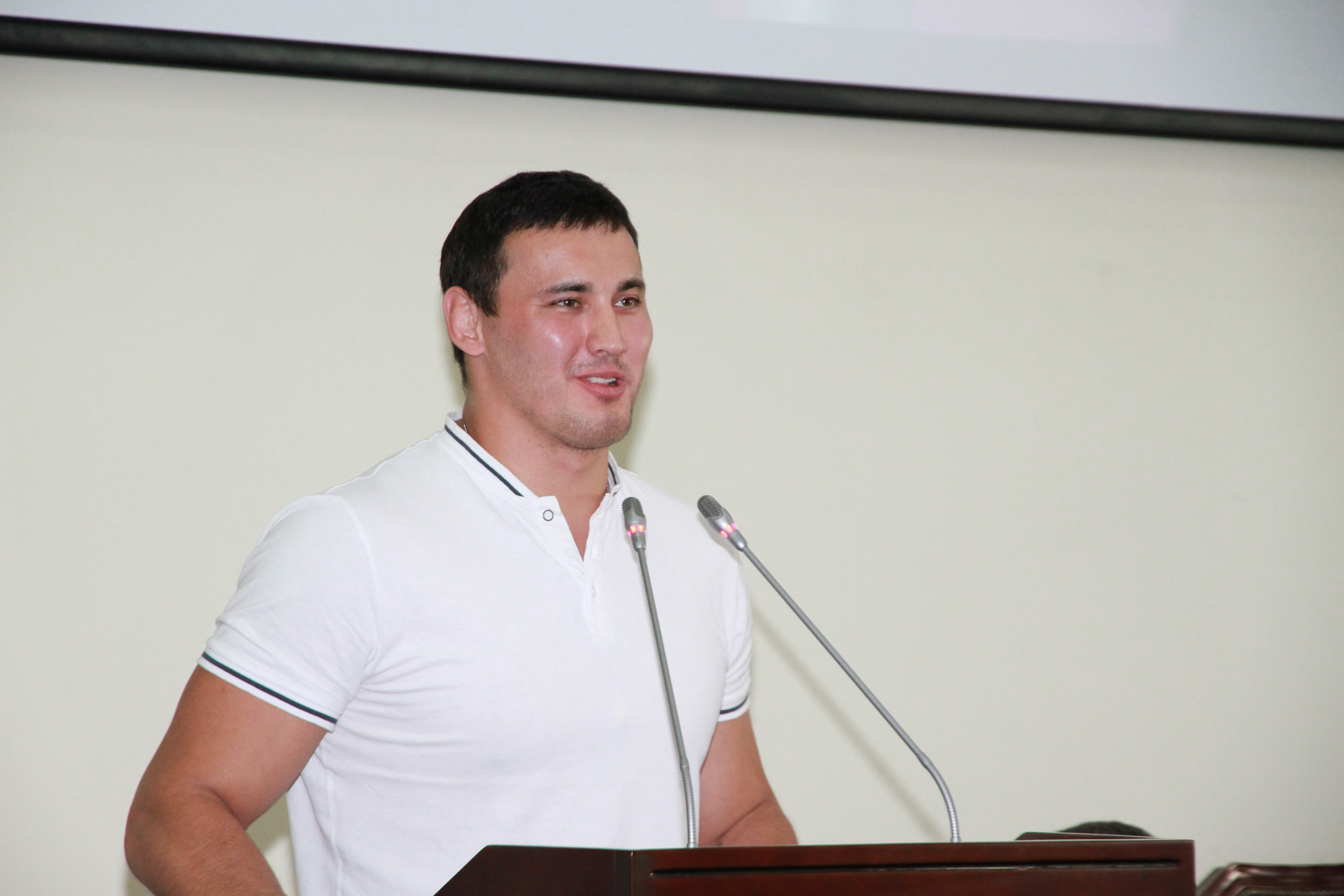
- Lazarev in 2018

Personal information
- Full name: Aiaal Petrovich Lazarev
- Nationality: Russia; Kyrgyzstan
- Born: 19 March 1986 (age 40) Verkhnevilyuysk, Yakutia, Russia
- Height: 195 cm (6 ft 5 in)

Sport
- Country: Kyrgyzstan
- Sport: Amateur wrestling
- Weight class: 125 kg
- Event: Freestyle
Medal record
Men's freestyle wrestling
Representing Kyrgyzstan
Asian Championships
Gold medal – first place	2015 Doha	125 kg
Silver medal – second place	2021 Almaty	125 kg
Silver medal – second place	2024 Bishkek	125 kg
Bronze medal – third place	2010 New Delhi	120 kg
Bronze medal – third place	2013 New Delhi	120 kg
Bronze medal – third place	2016 Bangkok	125 kg
Asian Games
Bronze medal – third place	2022 Hangzhou	125 kg
Individual World Cup
Bronze medal – third place	2020 Belgrade	125 kg
Yasar Dogu Tournament
Silver medal – second place	2015 Istanbul	125 kg
Grand Prix
Gold medal – first place	2011 Yakutsk	120 kg
Silver medal – second place	2020 Moscow	125 kg
Bronze medal – third place	2012 Yakutsk	120 kg
Bronze medal – third place	2013 Vanadzor	120 kg

Aiaal Petrovich Lazarev (Russian: Айаал Петрович Лазарев; born 19 March 1986 in Verkhnevilyuysk, Yakutia, Russia) is a Russian and Kyrgyz freestyle wrestler, champion and multiple medalist of the Asian Championships, World Cup medalist, participant in two Olympics (2016 and 2020). International Master of Sports of Kyrgyzstan. By nationality - Yakut. freestyle wrestler. He is a three-time bronze medalist (2010, 2013, 2016), silver medalist (2021), and an Asian Champion (2015).

He competed in the men's freestyle 125 kg event at the 2016 Summer Olympics. and 2020 Summer Olympics. the first wrestler who was able to achieve such results in history from Russian region Yakutia.

In 2020, he won one of the bronze medals in the men's 125 kg event at the 2020 Individual Wrestling World Cup held in Belgrade, Serbia.

He earned a quota place for Kyrgyzstan for the 2024 Summer Olympics at the 2024 World Wrestling Olympic Qualification Tournament held in Istanbul, Turkey. He lost his bronze medal match in the men's freestyle 125 kg event at the 2024 Summer Olympics in Paris, France.
