= Shivani Pawar =

Indian wrestler (born 1998)

Shivani Pawar (born 11 December 1998) is an Indian wrestler from Umreth Village, Chhindwara district, Madhya Pradesh, India.

== Early life ==
Shivani Pawar is a resident of Umreth Village in the Chhindwara district of Madhya Pradesh. The child of farmers, her interest in sports began with football and later shifted to wrestling.

== Career ==
In 2021, Pawar won the silver medal in the women's 50 kg category in the U-23 World Wrestling Championship held in Belgrade, Serbia, becoming the first Indian to win a medal at the tournament. She also took home the gold medal in the 50 kg category during the World Police and Fire Games in Canada. In 2024, she placed third in the 50 kg category at the Asian Wrestling Championship.

== See also ==
- Wrestling Federation of India
