= Giorgi Meshvildishvili =

Georgian-Azerbaijani freestyle wrestler

Giorgi Meshvildishvili გიორგი მეშვილდიშვილი
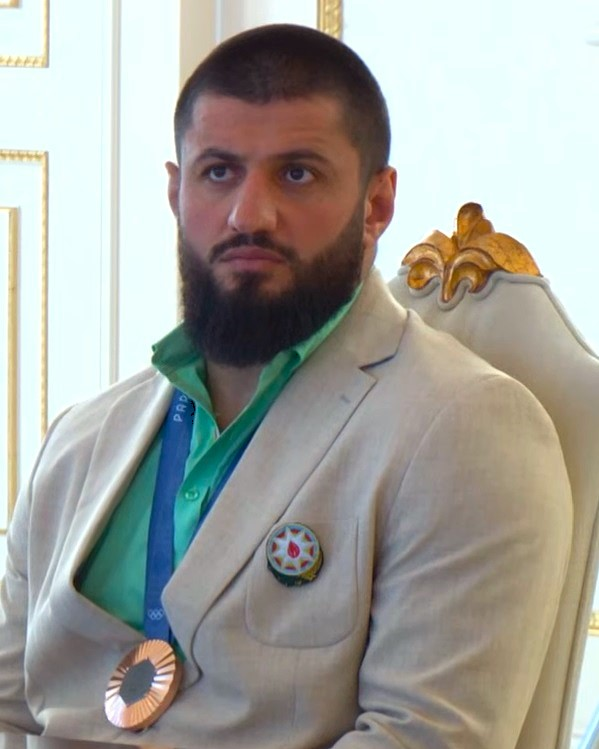
- Meshvildishvili, bronze medallist at the 2024 Summer Olympics

Personal information
- National team: Azerbaijan
- Born: 13 May 1992 (age 34) Tbilisi, Georgia
- Height: 184 cm (6 ft 0 in)
- Weight: 125 kg (276 lb)

Sport
- Country: Georgia (2012–2018); Azerbaijan (2023–present)
- Sport: Amateur wrestling
- Event: Freestyle
- Coached by: Zelimkhan Khuseynov
Medal record
Men's freestyle wrestling
Representing Azerbaijan
Olympic Games
Bronze medal – third place	2024 Paris	125 kg
World Championships
Silver medal – second place	2025 Zagreb	125 kg
Bronze medal – third place	2026 Astana	125 kg
European Championships
Gold medal – first place	2025 Bratislava	125 kg
Gold medal – first place	2026 Tirana	125 kg
Bronze medal – third place	2023 Zagreb	125 kg
Bronze medal – third place	2024 Bucharest	125 kg
Islamic Solidarity Games
Bronze medal – third place	2025 Riyadh	125 kg
Dan Kolov & Nikola Petrov Tournament
Gold medal – first place	2023 Sofia	125 kg
Grand Prix
Gold medal – first place	2025 Warsaw	125 kg
Gold medal – first place	2026 Vladikavkaz	125 kg
Silver medal – second place	2023 Zagreb	125 kg
Silver medal – second place	2023 Warsaw	125 kg
Silver medal – second place	2026 Baku	125 kg
Representing Georgia
Golden Grand Prix
Gold medal – first place	2014 Paris	125 kg
Grand Prix
Gold medal – first place	2014 Yakutsk	125 kg
Silver medal – second place	2017 Vanadzor	125 kg
Bronze medal – third place	2012 Vanadzor	120 kg
Bronze medal – third place	2016 Vanadzor	125 kg
Bronze medal – third place	2017 Tbilisi	97 kg
Bronze medal – third place	2017 Warsaw	125 kg
Bronze medal – third place	2018 Kiev	125 kg
European U23 Championships
Silver medal – second place	2015 Walbrzych	92 kg

Giorgi Meshvildishvili (Azerbaijani: Giorgi Meşvildişvili, Georgian: გიორგი მეშვილდიშვილი; born 13 May 1992) is a Georgian-Azerbaijani freestyle wrestler who currently competes at 125 kilograms. He won one of the bronze medals in the men's freestyle 125 kg event at the 2024 Summer Olympics in Paris, France.

== Wrestling career ==
Meshvildishvili, representing Georgia, won the European Sumo Championship. In 2015 European U23 Wrestling Championships, he won a silver medal at the European U23 Wrestling Championships in Poland, losing in the final to Muradin Kushkhov of Russia. In 2021, Meshvildishvili won the Azerbaijani Open Championship. He also won international tournaments in Kyiv, Vladikavkaz, Poland, Armenia and Kazakhstan. The way of the athlete to the world and European championships in freestyle wrestling was often blocked by the leader of the Georgian team, two-time Olympic medalist Geno Petriashvili.

Meshvildishvili made his debut as a member of the Azerbaijani team in early February at a ranking tournament in Croatia. At this tournament in Zagreb, Meshvildishvili reached the final, where he was to fight with Amir Husein Abbas of Iran, but didn't appear on the mat because of an injury. As a result, Meshvildishvili suffered a technical defeat and settled for the silver medal.

In April 2023 he took part in the 2023 European Wrestling Championships in Zagreb. Meshvildishvili defeated Gennady Chudinovich of Germany in qualification, but lost in the quarterfinals to Taha Akgul of Turkey. In the bronze medal he defeated Abraham Conyedo of Italy.

He competed at the 2024 European Wrestling Olympic Qualification Tournament in Baku, Azerbaijan and he earned a quota place for Azerbaijan for the 2024 Summer Olympics in Paris, France. He won one of the bronze medals in the men's freestyle 125 kg event at the Olympics.

As of April 1, 2026, with a score of 460 points, holds second place in the ranking of Azerbaijani athletes according to the Ministry of Youth and Sports.

On April 25, 2026, at the European Wrestling Championship in Tirana, he defeated Turkish athlete Hakan Büyükçıngıl with a score of 3:1 and advanced to the final, where he overcame Vladislav Baytsaev (Hungary) and won the gold medal.
