= Governmental leading high school =

Type of school in Iran

Nemouneh Dolati Schools (Persian: مدارس نمونه دولتی) are selective public schools in Iran that admit top-performing students through a competitive nationwide entrance exam. These schools aim to provide a higher level of academic education, preparing students for national university entrance exams and fostering talent across various fields.

== Entrance exam ==
The entrance exams for these schools are usually held at the end of each academic year and talented students with high IQ are accepted from the ninth grade to enter the tenth grade based on the test score. Passing the entrance exam of Nemouneh Dolati Schools requires high IQ, perseverance, strong skills and scientific support, and mastery of testing. In the past these tests were also held for sixth grade students
