= Shamil Sharipov =

Russian-Bahraini freestyle wrestler (born 1997)

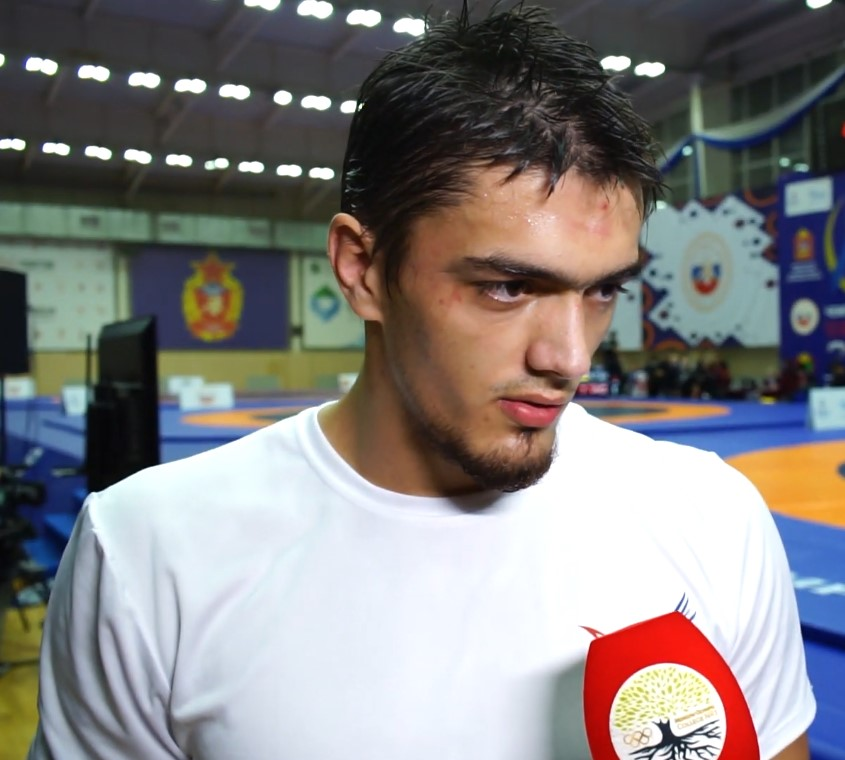
- Sharipov in 2020

Personal information
- Full name: Shamil Magomedovich Sharipov
- Born: Шамиль Магомедович Шарипов; 10 August 1997 (age 29) Makhachkala, Dagestan, Russia
- Height: 1.93 m (6 ft 4 in)

Sport
- Country: Russia (2019–2021); Bahrain (2024–present)
- Sport: Amateur wrestling
- Weight class: 125 kg
- Event: Freestyle
- Club: Abdulrashid Sadulaev Wrestling Club
- Coached by: Shamil Omarov
Medal record
Men's freestyle wrestling
Representing Bahrain
World Championships
| Bronze medal – third place | 2025 Zagreb | 125 kg |
Asian Championships
| Silver medal – second place | 2026 Bishkek | 125 kg |
| Bronze medal – third place | 2024 Bishkek | 125 kg |
| Bronze medal – third place | 2025 Amman | 125 kg |
Asian Games
| Bronze medal – third place | 2026 Nagoya | 125 kg |
Yasar Dogu Tournament
| Bronze medal – third place | 2024 Antalya | 125 kg |
Grand Prix
| Gold medal – first place | 2025 Madrid | 125 kg |
| Gold medal – first place | 2025 Budapest | 125 kg |
| Gold medal – first place | 2026 Zagreb | 125 kg |
| Silver medal – second place | 2026 Quba | 125 kg |
Men's Beach wrestling
Asian Beach Games
| Bronze medal – third place | 2026 Sanya | +90 kg |
Representing Russia
Individual World Cup
| Gold medal – first place | 2020 Belgrade | 125 kg |
Grand Prix
| Gold medal – first place | 2020 Moscow | 125 kg |
| Bronze medal – third place | 2019 Khasavyurt | 125 kg |
Representing Dagestan
Golden Grand Prix Ivan Yarygin
| Bronze medal – third place | 2020 Krasnoyarsk | 125 kg |
Russian Wrestling Championships
| Silver medal – second place | 2020 Naro-Fominsk | 125 kg |
Representing SC Siegfried Kleinostheim
Bundesliga
| Silver medal – second place | 2024/25 | Team |

Shamil Sharipov (Russian: Шамиль Магомедович Шарипов; born 10 August 1997) is a Russian-born Bahraini wrestler. He won the gold medal in the 125 kg event at 2020 Individual Wrestling World Cup.

== Career ==
He is the brother of wrestler Magomed Sharipov. He is a trainee of the Makhachkala School of Sports and Recreation, trained by Shamil Omarov. In September 2019 he won a tournament in honour of Khizri Shikhsaidov in Buglen, beating Zelimkhan Khizriev, Rasul Magomedov and Magomedamin Dibirov on his way.

In October 2020, he lost in the final of the Russian Championship to Alan Khugaev under controversial refereeing. In December 2020, he won the individual World Cup in Belgrade, defeating Poland's Robert Baran in the finals.

On 2 February 2024, it was announced that Sharipov would compete for Bahrain.

Sharipov debuted for Real American Freestyle with a pinfall victory over Anthony Cassioppi at RAF 08 on 18 April 2026.

He defeated Yonger Bastida by decision at RAF 10 on 13 June 2026.
