= Buheeerdun =

Chinese freestyle wrestler (born 2000)

Personal information
- Native name: 布和额尔敦
- Nationality: China
- Born: 15 June 2000 (age 26) Sonid Right Banner, Xilingol League, Inner Mongolia, China
- Height: 190 cm (6 ft 3 in)
- Weight: 125 kg (276 lb; 19.7 st)

Sport
- Country: China
- Sport: Amateur wrestling
- Weight class: 125 kg
- Event: Freestyle
Medal record
Men's freestyle wrestling
Representing China
Asian Championships
| Bronze medal – third place | 2023 Astana | 125 kg |
| Bronze medal – third place | 2024 Bishkek | 125 kg |
Asian Games
| Silver medal – second place | 2026 Nagoya | 125 kg |
| Bronze medal – third place | 2022 Hangzhou | 125 kg |
Grand Prix
| Gold medal – first place | 2024 Xi'an | 125 kg |
| Gold medal – first place | 2026 Xi'an | 125 kg |
| Bronze medal – third place | 2023 Bishkek | 125 kg |
| Bronze medal – third place | 2026 Budapest | 125 kg |
National Games of China
| Silver medal – second place | 2021 Shaanxi | 125 kg |
| Bronze medal – third place | 2025 Guangdong | 125 kg |
Asian Junior Championships
| Silver medal – second place | 2019 Chon Buri | 125 kg |

Buheeerdun (also called Buhe'e'erdun and Buheerdun; born 15 June 2000) is a Chinese Freestyle wrestler of Mongol ethnicity. He is a bronze medalist in the 125 kg event at both the 2023 Asian Wrestling Championships and the 2022 Asian Games.

== Background ==
Buheeerdun was born on 15 June 2000 in Inner Mongolia, China. He is of Mongol ethnicity.

In 2015 he was admitted to the Inner Mongolia Sports Management Center.

Buheeerdun has an older brother named Bu Hebilige who is a judoka that won a bronze medal at the 2019 Asian-Pacific Judo Championships and a gold medal at the 2021 National Games of China which were both in the 90 kg category. In the 2022 Asian Games he won a bronze medal at the mixed team event.

== Career ==
In September 2021, Buheeerdun participated in the Freestyle wrestling 125 kg event of the 2021 National Games of China where he represented Inner Mongolia province. He reached the final where he obtained a silver medal after losing to Deng Zhiwei of Shandong province in the final.

In April 2023, Buheeerdun participated in the 2023 Asian Wrestling Championships where he obtained a bronze medal after defeating Amir Reza Masoumi of Iran in the bronze medal bout.

In June 2023, Buheeerdun participated in the 2023 Kaba Uulu Kozhomkul & Raatbek Sanatbaev Tournament where he obtained a bronze medal after defeating fellow Chinese wrestler, Reheman Rusidanmu in the bronze medal bout.

In October 2023, Buheeerdun participated in the 2022 Asian Games where he obtained a bronze medal after defeating Yusup Batirmurzaev of Kazakhstan in the bronze medal bout.
