= Yusup Batirmurzaev =

Kazakhstani freestyle wrestler

Personal information
- Born: 13 April 1996 (age 30) Sulak, Dagestan, Russia
- Height: 197 cm (6 ft 6 in)
- Weight: 125 kg (276 lb)

Sport
- Country: Kazakhstan
- Sport: Amateur wrestling
- Weight class: 125 kg
- Event: Freestyle
Medal record
Men's freestyle wrestling
Representing Kazakhstan
Asian Championships
Gold medal – first place	2020 New Delhi	125 kg
Silver medal – second place	2023 Astana	125 kg
Yasar Dogu Tournament
Bronze medal – third place	2022 Istanbul	125 kg
Grand Prix
Silver medal – second place	2021 Rome	125 kg
Silver medal – second place	2022 Bucharest	125 kg
Silver medal – second place	2022 Taraz	125 kg
Silver medal – second place	2022 Almaty	125 kg
Silver medal – second place	2024 Budapest	125 kg
Bronze medal – third place	2015 Taras	125 kg
Bronze medal – third place	2020 Rome	125 kg
Bronze medal – third place	2021 Warsaw	125 kg
Bronze medal – third place	2021 Kaspisk	125 kg
Bronze medal – third place	2023 Alexandria	125 kg
Bronze medal – third place	2025 Grozny	125 kg
U23 World Championships
Bronze medal – third place	2019 Budapest	125 kg
Asian U23 Championship
Gold medal – first place	2019 Ulaanbaatar	125 kg

Yusup Batirmurzaev (Kazakh: Юсуп Сұлтанмагомадұлы Батырмұрзаев; born 13 April 1996) is a Kazakhstani freestyle wrestler. He won the gold medal in the men's 125 kg event at the 2020 Asian Wrestling Championships held in New Delhi, India. He represented Kazakhstan at the 2020 Summer Olympics in Tokyo, Japan and the 2024 Summer Olympics in Paris, France.

== Career ==
In 2019, Batirmurzaev won one of the bronze medals in the men's 125 kg event at the World U23 Wrestling Championship in Budapest, Hungary. He won the gold medal in the men's 125 kg event at the 2020 Asian Wrestling Championships held in New Delhi, India.

In 2021, Batirmurzaev won one of the bronze medals in the men's 125 kg event at the 2021 Waclaw Ziolkowski Memorial held in Warsaw, Poland. A few months later, Batirmurzaev competed in the men's 125 kg event at the 2020 Summer Olympics in Tokyo, Japan where he was eliminated in his first match by Gennadij Cudinovic of Germany.

In 2022, Batirmurzaev won one of the bronze medals in his event at the Yasar Dogu Tournament held in Istanbul, Turkey. He won the silver medal in his event at the 2023 Asian Wrestling Championships held in Astana, Kazakhstan.

Batirmurzaev competed at the 2024 Asian Wrestling Olympic Qualification Tournament in Bishkek, Kyrgyzstan and he earned a quota place for Kazakhstan for the 2024 Summer Olympics in Paris, France. He competed in the men's 125 kg event at the Olympics.

== Achievements ==
Year	Tournament	Location	Result	Event
2020	Asian Championships	New Delhi, India	1st	Freestyle 125 kg
2023	Asian Championships	Astana, Kazakhstan	2nd	Freestyle 125 kg
