= Robert Baran =

Polish freestyle wrestler

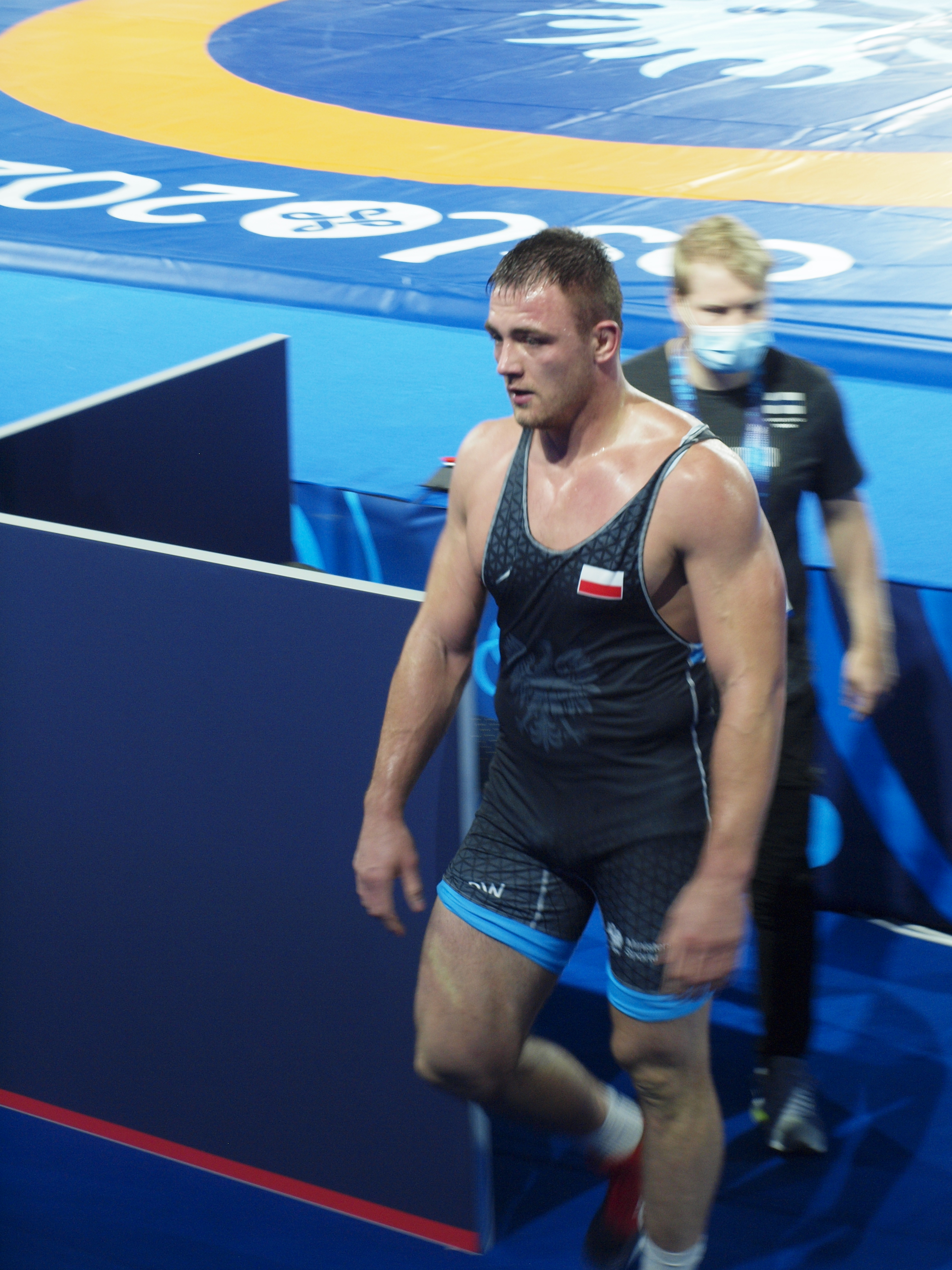
- Robert Baran at the 2021 World Wrestling Championships in Oslo, Norway

Personal information
- Nationality: Poland
- Born: 3 July 1992 (age 34) Jarocin, Poland
- Height: 183 cm (6 ft 0 in)

Sport
- Country: Poland
- Sport: Wrestling
- Weight class: 125 kg
- Event: Freestyle
Medal record
Men's freestyle wrestling
Representing Poland
World Championships
Bronze medal – third place	2025 Zagreb	125 kg
Individual World Cup
Silver medal – second place	2020 Belgrade	125 kg
European Championships
Silver medal – second place	2020 Rome	125 kg
Silver medal – second place	2016 Riga	125 kg
Bronze medal – third place	2022 Budapest	125 kg
Bronze medal – third place	2018 Kaspiysk	125 kg
Military World Games
Silver medal – second place	2019 Wuhan	125 kg
World Military Championships
Gold medal – first place	2025 Warendorf	125 kg
Silver medal – second place	2021 Tehran	125 kg
Yasar Dogu Tournament
Bronze medal – third place	2017 Istanbul	125 kg
Dan Kolov & Nikola Petrov Tournament
Bronze medal – third place	2016 Sofia	125 kg
Grand Prix
Gold medal – first place	2015 Tunis	125 kg
Gold medal – first place	2020 Warsaw	125 kg
Gold medal – first place	2022 Madrid	125 kg
Gold medal – first place	2024 Warsaw	125 kg
Gold medal – first place	2024 Madrid	125 kg
Gold medal – first place	2026 Warsaw	125 kg
Silver medal – second place	2018 Warsaw	125 kg
Silver medal – second place	2018 Grozny	125 kg
Silver medal – second place	2019 Kyiv	125 kg
Silver medal – second place	2021 Nice	125 kg
Silver medal – second place	2022 Rome	125 kg
Bronze medal – third place	2016 Sassari	125 kg
Bronze medal – third place	2017 Tbilisi	125 kg
Bronze medal – third place	2017 Khasavyurt	125 kg
Bronze medal – third place	2018 Kiev	125 kg
Bronze medal – third place	2019 Warsaw	125 kg
Bronze medal – third place	2023 Zagreb	125 kg
Bronze medal – third place	2023 Warsaw	125 kg
Bronze medal – third place	2025 Budapest	125 kg
Bronze medal – third place	2025 Warsaw	125 kg
Bronze medal – third place	2026 Ulaanbaatar	125 kg
Bronze medal – third place	2026 Yerevan	125 kg
European Juniors Championships
Bronze medal – third place	2010 Samokov	84 kg
European Cadets Championships
Bronze medal – third place	2009 Zrenjanin	85 kg
Representing Maharashtra Kesari
Pro Wrestling League
Bronze medal – third place	2026 Noida	Team

Robert Baran (born 3 July 1992, in Jarocin) is a Polish freestyle wrestler. He reached the quarter-finals in the men's freestyle 125 kg event at the 2016 Summer Olympics, and finished fifth in the same competition at the 2024 Summer Olympics.

In 2020, Baran won the silver medal in the men's 125 kg event at the 2020 Individual Wrestling World Cup held in Belgrade, Serbia. In March 2021, he competed at the European Qualification Tournament in Budapest, Hungary hoping to qualify for the 2020 Summer Olympics in Tokyo, Japan.

In 2022, Baran won one of the bronze medals in the 125 kg event at the European Wrestling Championships held in Budapest, Hungary. A few months later, he won the silver medal in his event at the Matteo Pellicone Ranking Series 2022 held in Rome, Italy. He competed in the 125 kg event at the 2022 World Wrestling Championships held in Belgrade, Serbia.

He lost his bronze medal match in the men's freestyle 125 kg event at the 2024 Summer Olympics in Paris, France.

His brother Radosław is also a freestyle wrestler.
