= Khasanboy Rakhimov =

Uzbekistani freestyle wrestler

Sport
- Country: Uzbekistan
- Sport: Amateur wrestling
- Weight class: 125 kg
- Event: Freestyle
Medal record
Men's freestyle wrestling
Representing Uzbekistan
World Championships
Disqualified	2019 Nur-Sultan	125 kg
Islamic Solidarity Games
Bronze medal – third place	2021 Konya	125 kg
Yasar Dogu Tournament
Bronze medal – third place	2020 Istanbul	125 kg
Grand Prix
Gold medal – first place	2019 Minsk	125 kg
Bronze medal – third place	2023 Alexandria	125 kg
World Juniors Championships
Bronze medal – third place	2018 Trnava	125 kg
Asian Juniors Championships
Gold medal – first place	2017 Taichung	120 kg
Silver medal – second place	2018 New Delhi	125 kg
World Cadets Championships
Silver medal – second place	2015 Sarajevo	110 kg

Khasanboy Rakhimov is an Uzbekistani freestyle wrestler. He won one of the bronze medals in the men's 125 kg event at the 2019 World Wrestling Championships but his medal was stripped as he tested positive for a banned substance. He would have been scheduled to represent Uzbekistan at the 2020 Summer Olympics in Tokyo, Japan, but the Olympic quota for that spot was given to a runner up.

He also won first place in the 2019 Medved International competition.

In 2022, he competed at the Yasar Dogu Tournament held in Istanbul, Turkey.

He won the bronze medal in the men's 125 kg event at the 2021 Islamic Solidarity Games held in Konya, Turkey. He competed in the 125 kg event at the 2022 World Wrestling Championships held in Belgrade, Serbia.

== Achievements ==
Year	Tournament	Location	Result	Event
2019	~~World Championships~~	~~Nur-Sultan, Kazakhstan~~	~~3rd~~	~~Freestyle 125 kg~~
2022	Islamic Solidarity Games	Konya, Turkey	2nd	Freestyle 125 kg
