= Wrestling at the 2016 Summer Olympics – Qualification =

This article details the qualifying phase for wrestling at the 2016 Summer Olympics. The competition at these Games comprised a total of 344 athletes coming from the different nations; each had been allowed to enter a maximum of 18 (1 per event).

Four places had been reserved for the host nation Brazil, and four more for the Tripartite Commission to invite wrestlers. The remaining spots were allocated through the qualification process, wherein the athletes earn places for their respective nation. For each place obtained by the host country in the qualification phase, one of these three reserved places was allocated to the Tripartite Commission.

== Timeline ==
Event	Date	Venue
2015 World Championships	September 7–15, 2015	Las Vegas, United States
Pan American Qualification Tournament	March 4–6, 2016	Frisco, United States
Asian Qualification Tournament	March 18–20, 2016	Astana, Kazakhstan
African & Oceania Qualification Tournament	April 1–3, 2016	Algiers, Algeria
European Qualification Tournament	April 15–17, 2016	Zrenjanin, Serbia
1st World Qualification Tournament	April 22–24, 2016	Ulaanbaatar, Mongolia
2nd World Qualification Tournament	May 6–8, 2016	Istanbul, Turkey

== Qualification summary ==
NOC	Men's freestyle						Men's Greco-Roman						Women's freestyle						Total
NOC	57	65	74	86	97	125	59	66	75	85	98	130	48	53	58	63	69	75	Total
Algeria								X		X	X								3
Argentina													X						1
Armenia	X	X			X	X		X	X	X	X								8
Australia		X	X									X							3
Austria										X									1
Azerbaijan	X	X	X	X	X	X	X	X	X	X		X	X	X	X				14
Bahrain		X																	1
Belarus	X			X		X	X			X	X					X		X	8
Brazil												X			X	X	X	X	5
Bulgaria	X	X	X	X		X			X	X	X		X		X	X			11
Cambodia													X						1
Cameroon													X	X				X	3
Canada		X				X							X	X	X	X	X	X	8
China		X		X		X	X		X	X	X	X	X	X		X	X	X	13
Chinese Taipei																	X		1
Colombia			X						X				X		X			X	5
Croatia									X										1
Cuba	X	X	X	X	X		X	X	X		X	X							10
Czech Republic																X			1
Denmark									X										1
Ecuador							X								X				2
Egypt				X		X	X	X	X	X	X	X					X	X	10
Estonia											X	X						X	3
Finland								X		X					X				3
France			X															X	2
Georgia	X	X	X	X	X	X		X	X	X	X	X							11
Germany								X		X		X		X	X		X	X	7
Greece														X					1
Guinea-Bissau			X		X														2
Haiti			X																1
Honduras													X						1
Hungary				X		X		X	X	X	X					X		X	8
India	X	X	X							X	X		X	X	X				8
Iran	X	X	X	X	X	X	X	X	X	X	X	X							12
Israel																	X		1
Italy		X									X								2
Japan	X		X				X	X					X	X	X	X	X	X	10
Kazakhstan	X		X	X	X	X	X		X			X	X			X	X	X	12
Kyrgyzstan					X	X	X	X		X		X			X				7
Latvia																X			1
Lithuania								X											1
Mexico										X									1
Moldova			X		X										X				3
Mongolia	X	X	X	X	X	X								X	X	X	X		10
Morocco	X						X		X										3
Netherlands													X						1
New Zealand								X											1
Nigeria		X			X								X	X	X	X	X		7
North Korea	X						X						X	X					4
Norway							X										X		2
Palau						X													1
Peru															X				1
Poland		X		X	X	X							X	X		X	X		8
Puerto Rico		X		X															2
Romania	X				X			X			X		X						5
Russia	X	X	X	X	X	X	X	X	X	X	X	X	X		X	X	X	X	17
Senegal	X													X					2
Serbia							X	X	X										3
South Korea	X			X			X	X	X										5
Spain			X																1
Sweden										X	X	X		X	X	X	X		7
Tunisia				X		X									X	X			4
Turkey	X	X	X	X	X	X			X		X	X		X	X	X	X	X	14
Ukraine		X			X	X				X	X	X		X	X	X	X	X	11
United States	X	X	X	X	X	X	X		X	X		X	X	X		X		X	14
Uzbekistan	X	X	X		X		X		X	X		X							8
Venezuela				X	X		X	X			X	X		X			X	X	9
Vietnam													X	X					2
Total: 68 NOCs	20	21	20	19	19	20	19	19	20	21	19	19	20	19	20	19	18	18	350

== Men's freestyle events ==
=== 57 kg ===
Competition	Places	Qualified wrestlers
2015 World Championships	6+1	Vladimer Khinchegashvili (GEO); Hassan Rahimi (IRI); Erdenebatyn Bekhbayar (MGL); Viktor Lebedev (RUS) (Note: Russia's Viktor Lebedev originally earned a quota place at the 2015 World Championships, but because of new regulations set by the IOC, he was not allowed to participate due to a positive doping test at the 2006 Junior World Championships. His spot has been replaced by Belarus, the nation of the next best-ranked wrestler from the 2015 World Championships. Later that decision was reverted by CAS.); Artas Sanaa (KAZ); Jong Hak-jin (PRK); Asadulla Lachinau (BLR)
Pan American Qualification Tournament	2	Yowlys Bonne (CUB); Tony Ramos (USA)
Asian Qualification Tournament	2	Rei Higuchi (JPN); Yun Jun-sik (KOR)
African & Oceania Qualification Tournament	2	Adama Diatta (SEN); Chakir Ansari (MAR)
European Qualification Tournament	2	Vladimir Dubov (BUL); Garnik Mnatsakanyan (ARM)
1st World Qualification Tournament	3	Ivan Guidea (ROU); Mirjalal Hasanzada (AZE); Sandeep Tomar (IND)
2nd World Qualification Tournament	2	Süleyman Atlı (TUR); Abbos Rakhmonov (UZB)
Invitational / Host Country	0	—
Total	20	

=== 65 kg ===
Competition	Places	Qualified wrestlers
2015 World Championships	6	Frank Chamizo (ITA); Ikhtiyor Navruzov (UZB); Soslan Ramonov (RUS); Ahmad Mohammadi (IRI); Ganzorigiin Mandakhnaran (MGL); Toghrul Asgarov (AZE)
Pan American Qualification Tournament	2	Alejandro Valdés (CUB); Franklin Gómez (PUR)
Asian Qualification Tournament	2	Yogeshwar Dutt (IND); Yeerlanbieke Katai (CHN)
African & Oceania Qualification Tournament	2	Amas Daniel (NGR); Sahit Prizreni (AUS)
European Qualification Tournament	2+2	Magomedmurad Gadzhiev (POL) (Note: Poland's Magomedmurad Gadzhiev and Ukraine's Andriy Kviatkovskyi initially secured quota places for their respective countries in men's freestyle 65 kg at the European Qualification Tournament, but have had their results nullified and associate Olympic licenses revoked due to doping violations for meldonium. As a result, the Olympic licenses were redistributed to Georgia and Armenia. but on 9 July 2016, United World Wrestling, following new meldonium guidelines has announced the reinstatement of NOC qualification spots for Gadzhiev and Kviatkovskyi.); Andriy Kviatkovskyi (UKR); David Safaryan (ARM); Zurabi Iakobishvili (GEO)
1st World Qualification Tournament	3	Adam Batirov (BRN); Yakup Gör (TUR); Borislav Novachkov (BUL) (Note: Georgia (Zurabi Iakobishvili) initially secured a quota place in men's freestyle 65 kg at the first World Olympic Qualifier. Following the adjustment of Olympic qualifying nations as a response to doping violations, the nation's license was transferred to Bulgaria. Moreover, the unused license won by Bulgaria at the final World Olympic Qualifier was awarded to the United States.)
2nd World Qualification Tournament	2	Haislan Garcia (CAN); Frank Molinaro (USA)
Invitational / Host Country	0	—
Total	21	

=== 74 kg ===
Competition	Places	Qualified wrestlers
2015 World Championships	6	Jordan Burroughs (USA); Pürevjavyn Önörbat (MGL); Narsingh Yadav (IND); Aniuar Geduev (RUS); Zelimkhan Khadjiev (FRA); Alireza Ghasemi (IRI)
Pan American Qualification Tournament	2	Liván López (CUB); Carlos Izquierdo (COL)
Asian Qualification Tournament	2	Galymzhan Usserbayev (KAZ); Sosuke Takatani (JPN)
African & Oceania Qualification Tournament	2	Augusto Midana (GBS); Talgat Ilyasov (AUS)
European Qualification Tournament	2	Jabrayil Hasanov (AZE); Jakob Makarashvili (GEO)
1st World Qualification Tournament	3	Soner Demirtaş (TUR); Georgi Ivanov (BUL); Evgheni Nedealco (MDA)
2nd World Qualification Tournament	2	Bekzod Abdurakhmonov (UZB); Taimuraz Friev (ESP)
Invitational / Host Country	1	Asnage Castelly (HAI)
Total	20	

=== 86 kg ===
Competition	Places	Qualified wrestlers
2015 World Championships	6	Abdulrashid Sadulaev (RUS); Selim Yaşar (TUR); Sandro Aminashvili (GEO); Alireza Karimi (IRI); Magomedgadzhi Khatiyev (AZE); Mihail Ganev (BUL)
Pan American Qualification Tournament	2	Reineris Salas (CUB); Jaime Espinal (PUR)
Asian Qualification Tournament	2	Orgodolyn Üitümen (MGL); Aslan Kakhidze (KAZ)
African & Oceania Qualification Tournament	2	Mohamed Zaghloul (EGY); Mohamed Saadaoui (TUN)
European Qualification Tournament	2	István Veréb (HUN); Amarhajy Mahamedau (BLR)
1st World Qualification Tournament	3	J'den Cox (USA); Pedro Ceballos (VEN); Zbigniew Baranowski (POL)
2nd World Qualification Tournament	2	Bi Shengfeng (CHN); Kim Gwan-uk (KOR)
Invitational / Host Country	0	—
Total	19	

=== 97 kg ===
Competition	Places	Qualified wrestlers
2015 World Championships	6	Kyle Snyder (USA); Abdusalam Gadisov (RUS); Khetag Gazyumov (AZE); Pavlo Oliynyk (UKR); Elizbar Odikadze (GEO); Abbas Tahan (IRI)
Pan American Qualification Tournament	2	Javier Cortina (CUB); José Daniel Díaz (VEN)
Asian Qualification Tournament	2	Magomed Musaev (KGZ); Mamed Ibragimov (KAZ)
African & Oceania Qualification Tournament	2	Soso Tamarau (NGR); Bedopassa Buassat (GBS) (Note: Egypt (Aly Hamdy) originally earned a quota place in men's freestyle 97 kg at the African & Oceania Qualification Tournament, but have had its results nullified and associate Olympic license revoked for failing the doping test. The Olympic license was transferred to Guinea-Bissau.)
European Qualification Tournament	2	Radosław Baran (POL); İbrahim Bölükbaşı (TUR)
1st World Qualification Tournament	3	Georgy Ketoev (ARM); Magomed Ibragimov (UZB); Nicolae Ceban (MDA)
2nd World Qualification Tournament	2	Albert Saritov (ROU); Dorjkhandyn Khüderbulga (MGL)
Invitational / Host Country	0	—
Total	19	

=== 125 kg ===
Competition	Places	Qualified wrestlers
2015 World Championships	6	Taha Akgül (TUR); Jamaladdin Magomedov (AZE); Geno Petriashvili (GEO); Bilyal Makhov (RUS); Jargalsaikhany Chuluunbat (MGL); Levan Berianidze (ARM)
Pan American Qualification Tournament	2	Tervel Dlagnev (USA); Korey Jarvis (CAN)
Asian Qualification Tournament	2	Komeil Ghasemi (IRI); Daulet Shabanbay (KAZ)
African & Oceania Qualification Tournament	2	Diaaeldin Kamal (EGY); Slim Trabelsi (TUN)
European Qualification Tournament	2	Lyuben Iliev (BUL) (Note: Belarus' Yusup Jalilau and Ukraine's Alen Zaseyev initially secured quota places for their respective countries in the men's freestyle 125 kg at the European Qualification Tournament, but have had their results nullified and associate Olympic licenses revoked due to doping violations for meldonium. As a result, the Olympic licenses were redistributed to Bulgaria and Hungary. Moreover, the unused license won by Hungary at the first World Olympic Qualifier was awarded to Kyrgyzstan.); Dániel Ligeti (HUN)
1st World Qualification Tournament	3	Deng Zhiwei (CHN); Robert Baran (POL); Aiaal Lazarev (KGZ)
2nd World Qualification Tournament	2	Oleksandr Khotsianivskyi (UKR); Ibrahim Saidau (BLR)
Invitational / Host Country	1	Florian Skilang Temengil (PLW)
Total	20	

== Men's Greco-Roman events ==
=== 59 kg ===
Competition	Places	Qualified wrestlers
2015 World Championships	6	Ismael Borrero (CUB); Rovshan Bayramov (AZE); Yun Won-chol (PRK); Almat Kebispayev (KAZ); Arsen Eraliev (KGZ); Soslan Daurov (BLR)
Pan American Qualification Tournament	2	Andrés Montaño (ECU); Raiber Rodríguez (VEN)
Asian Qualification Tournament	2	Wang Lumin (CHN); Shinobu Ota (JPN)
African & Oceania Qualification Tournament	2	Haithem Mahmoud (EGY); Mehdi Messaoudi (MAR)
European Qualification Tournament	2	Sanal Semenov (RUS); Kristijan Fris (SRB)
1st World Qualification Tournament	3	Kim Seung-hak (KOR); Stig-André Berge (NOR); Elmurat Tasmuradov (UZB)
2nd World Qualification Tournament	2	Hamid Sourian (IRI); Jesse Thielke (USA)
Invitational / Host Country	0	—
Total	19	

=== 66 kg ===
Competition	Places	Qualified wrestlers
2015 World Championships	6	Frank Stäbler (GER); Ryu Han-su (KOR); Davor Štefanek (SRB); Artem Surkov (RUS); Tarek Benaissa (ALG); Mihran Harutyunyan (ARM)
Pan American Qualification Tournament	2	Wuileixis Rivas (VEN); Miguel Martínez (CUB)
Asian Qualification Tournament	2	Tomohiro Inoue (JPN); Omid Norouzi (IRI)
African & Oceania Qualification Tournament	2	Adham Ahmed Saleh (EGY); Craig Miller (NZL) (Note: Australian Vinod Kumar Dahiya originally earned a quota place in men's Greco-Roman 66 kg at the African & Oceania Qualification Tournament, but tested positive for doping, giving his nation's Olympic license to New Zealand.) (Note: A late injury prevented Brenda Bailey, Craig Miller and Vũ Thị Hằng to participate at the games, the quotas remained unused.)
European Qualification Tournament	2	Tamás Lőrincz (HUN); Shmagi Bolkvadze (GEO)
1st World Qualification Tournament	3	Ion Panait (ROU); Tero Välimäki (FIN); Edgaras Venckaitis (LTU)
2nd World Qualification Tournament	2	Rasul Chunayev (AZE); Ruslan Tsarev (KGZ)
Invitational / Host Country	0	—
Total	19	

=== 75 kg ===
Competition	Places	Qualified wrestlers
2015 World Championships	6	Roman Vlasov (RUS); Mark Madsen (DEN); Andy Bisek (USA); Doszhan Kartikov (KAZ); Saeid Abdevali (IRI); Elvin Mursaliyev (AZE)
Pan American Qualification Tournament	2	Yurisandy Hernández (CUB); Carlos Muñoz (COL)
Asian Qualification Tournament	2	Kim Hyeon-woo (KOR); Dilshod Turdiev (UZB)
African & Oceania Qualification Tournament	2	Zied Ayet Ikram (MAR); Mahmoud Fawzy (EGY)
European Qualification Tournament	2	Viktor Nemeš (SRB); Zurabi Datunashvili (GEO)
1st World Qualification Tournament	3	Péter Bácsi (HUN); Yang Bin (CHN); Arsen Julfalakyan (ARM)
2nd World Qualification Tournament	2	Selçuk Çebi (TUR); Daniel Aleksandrov (BUL)
Invitational / Host Country	1	Božo Starčević (CRO)
Total	20	

=== 85 kg ===
Competition	Places	Qualified wrestlers
2015 World Championships	6	Zhan Beleniuk (UKR); Rustam Assakalov (UZB); Habibollah Akhlaghi (IRI); Saman Tahmasebi (AZE); Rami Hietaniemi (FIN); Viktor Lőrincz (HUN)
Pan American Qualification Tournament	2	Jordan Holm (USA); Alfonso Leyva (MEX)
Asian Qualification Tournament	2+1	Peng Fei (CHN); Janarbek Kenjeev (KGZ) (Note: Kyrgyzstan's Janarbek Kenjeev originally earned a quota place in men's Greco-Roman 85 kg at the Asian Qualification Tournament, but tested positive for doping, giving his nation's Olympic license to India. but on 9 July 2016, United World Wrestling, following new meldonium guidelines has announced the reinstatement of NOC qualification spot for Kenjeev.); Ravinder Khatri (IND)
African & Oceania Qualification Tournament	2	Ahmed Othman (EGY); Adem Boudjemline (ALG)
European Qualification Tournament	2	Aleksey Mishin (RUS); Nikolay Bayryakov (BUL)
1st World Qualification Tournament	3	Javid Hamzatau (BLR); Maksim Manukyan (ARM); Zakarias Berg (SWE)
2nd World Qualification Tournament	2	Denis Kudla (GER); Roberti Kobliashvili (GEO)
Invitational / Host Country	1	Amer Hrustanović (AUT)
Total	21	

=== 98 kg ===
Competition	Places	Qualified wrestlers
2015 World Championships	6	Artur Aleksanyan (ARM); Ghasem Rezaei (IRI); Islam Magomedov (RUS); Dimitriy Timchenko (UKR); Elis Guri (BUL); Alin Alexuc-Ciurariu (ROU)
Pan American Qualification Tournament	2	Yasmany Lugo (CUB); Luillys Pérez (VEN)
Asian Qualification Tournament	2	Xiao Di (CHN); Hardeep Singh (IND)
African & Oceania Qualification Tournament	2	Hamdy Abdelwahab (EGY); Hamza Haloui (ALG)
European Qualification Tournament	2	Ardo Arusaar (EST); Ádám Varga (HUN)
1st World Qualification Tournament	3	Aliaksandr Hrabovik (BLR); Revaz Nadareishvili (GEO); Fredrik Schön (SWE)
2nd World Qualification Tournament	2	Cenk İldem (TUR); Daigoro Timoncini (ITA)
Invitational / Host Country	0	—
Total	19	

=== 130 kg ===
Competition	Places	Qualified wrestlers
2015 World Championships	6	Rıza Kayaalp (TUR); Mijaín López (CUB); Oleksandr Chernetskyi (UKR); Bilyal Makhov (RUS); Sabah Shariati (AZE); Robby Smith (USA)
Pan American Qualification Tournament	2	Erwin Caraballo (VEN); Antoine Jaoude (BRA)
Asian Qualification Tournament	2	Nurmakhan Tinaliyev (KAZ); Murat Ramonov (KGZ)
African & Oceania Qualification Tournament	2	Abdellatif Mohamed (EGY); Ivan Popov (AUS)
European Qualification Tournament	2	Heiki Nabi (EST); Eduard Popp (GER)
1st World Qualification Tournament	3	Amir Ghasemi Monjazi (IRI); Meng Qiang (CHN); Muminjon Abdullaev (UZB)
2nd World Qualification Tournament	2	Johan Eurén (SWE); Iakobi Kajaia (GEO)
Invitational / Host Country	0	—
Total	19	

== Women's freestyle events ==
=== 48 kg ===
Competition	Places	Qualified wrestlers
2015 World Championships	6	Eri Tosaka (JPN); Mariya Stadnik (AZE); Jessica Blaszka (NED); Geneviève Morrison (CAN); Li Hui (CHN); Valentina Islamova (RUS)
Pan American Qualification Tournament	2	Carolina Castillo (COL); Patricia Bermúdez (ARG)
Asian Qualification Tournament	2	Zhuldyz Eshimova (KAZ); Vũ Thị Hằng (VIE)
African & Oceania Qualification Tournament	2	Mercy Genesis (NGR); Rebecca Muambo (CMR)
European Qualification Tournament	2	Elitsa Yankova (BUL); Alina Vuc (ROU)
1st World Qualification Tournament	2	Kim Hyon-gyong (PRK); Haley Augello (USA)
2nd World Qualification Tournament	2	Vinesh Phogat (IND); Iwona Matkowska (POL)
Invitational / Host Country	2	Chov Sotheara (CAM); Brenda Bailey (HON)
Total	20	

=== 53 kg ===
Competition	Places	Qualified wrestlers
2015 World Championships	6	Saori Yoshida (JPN); Sofia Mattsson (SWE); Jong Myong-suk (PRK); Odunayo Adekuoroye (NGR); Anzhela Dorogan (AZE); Zhong Xuechun (CHN)
Pan American Qualification Tournament	2	Jillian Gallays (CAN); Betzabeth Argüello (VEN)
Asian Qualification Tournament	2+1	Erdenechimegiin Sumiyaa (MGL) (Note: Mongolia's Erdenechimegiin Sumiyaa originally earned a quota place in women's freestyle 53 kg at the Asian Qualification Tournament, but tested positive for doping, giving her nation's Olympic license to India. but on 9 July 2016, United World Wrestling, following new meldonium guidelines has announced the reinstatement of NOC qualification spot for Sumiyaa.); Nguyễn Thị Lụa (VIE); Babita Kumari (IND)
African & Oceania Qualification Tournament	2	Isabelle Sambou (SEN); Joseph Essombe (CMR)
European Qualification Tournament	2	Katarzyna Krawczyk (POL); Nina Hemmer (GER)
1st World Qualification Tournament	2	Helen Maroulis (USA); Maria Prevolaraki (GRE)
2nd World Qualification Tournament	2	Yuliya Khavaldzhy (UKR); Bediha Gün (TUR)
Invitational / Host Country	0	—
Total	19	

=== 58 kg ===
Competition	Places	Qualified wrestlers
2015 World Championships	6	Kaori Icho (JPN); Petra Olli (FIN); Elif Jale Yeşilırmak (TUR); Yuliya Ratkevich (AZE); Jackeline Rentería (COL); Johanna Mattsson (SWE)
Pan American Qualification Tournament	2	Michelle Fazzari (CAN); Joice Silva (BRA)
Asian Qualification Tournament	2	Aisuluu Tynybekova (KGZ); Pürevdorjiin Orkhon (MGL)
African & Oceania Qualification Tournament	2	Marwa Amri (TUN); Aminat Adeniyi (NGR)
European Qualification Tournament	2+1	Mimi Hristova (BUL); Oksana Herhel (UKR) (Note: Ukraine's Oksana Herhel originally earned a quota place in women's freestyle 58 kg at the European Qualification Tournament, but tested positive for doping, giving her nation's Olympic license to Moldova. but on 9 July 2016, United World Wrestling, following new meldonium guidelines has announced the reinstatement of NOC qualification spot for Herhel.); Mariana Cherdivara (MDA)
1st World Qualification Tournament	2	Lissette Antes (ECU); Luisa Niemesch (GER)
2nd World Qualification Tournament	2	Valeria Koblova (RUS); Sakshi Malik (IND)
Invitational / Host Country	1	Yanet Sovero (PER)
Total	20	

=== 63 kg ===
Competition	Places	Qualified wrestlers
2015 World Championships	6	Soronzonboldyn Battsetseg (MGL); Risako Kawai (JPN); Yuliya Tkach (UKR); Taybe Yusein (BUL); Braxton Stone-Papadopoulos (CAN); Anastasija Grigorjeva (LAT)
Pan American Qualification Tournament	2	Erin Clodgo (USA); Laís Nunes (BRA)
Asian Qualification Tournament	2	Wang Xiaoqian (CHN); Yekaterina Larionova (KAZ)
African & Oceania Qualification Tournament	2	Hela Riabi (TUN); Blessing Oborududu (NGR)
European Qualification Tournament	2	Maryia Mamashuk (BLR); Anastasia Bratchikova (RUS)
1st World Qualification Tournament	2	Hafize Şahin (TUR); Marianna Sastin (HUN)
2nd World Qualification Tournament	2	Monika Michalik (POL); Henna Johansson (SWE)
Invitational / Host Country	1	Adéla Hanzlíčková (CZE)
Total	19	

=== 69 kg ===
Competition	Places	Qualified wrestlers
2015 World Championships	6	Natalia Vorobieva (RUS); Zhou Feng (CHN); Sara Dosho (JPN); Aline Focken (GER); Ochirbatyn Nasanburmaa (MGL); Jenny Fransson (SWE)
Pan American Qualification Tournament	2	Dorothy Yeats (CAN); Gilda Oliveira (BRA)
Asian Qualification Tournament	2	Elmira Syzdykova (KAZ); Chen Wen-ling (TPE)
African & Oceania Qualification Tournament	2	Hannah Reuben (NGR); Enas Mostafa (EGY)
European Qualification Tournament	2	Agnieszka Wieszczek (POL); Buse Tosun (TUR)
1st World Qualification Tournament	2	Ilana Kratysh (ISR); María Acosta (VEN)
2nd World Qualification Tournament	2	Alina Stadnyk (UKR); Signe Marie Store (NOR)
Invitational / Host Country	0	—
Total	18	

=== 75 kg ===
Competition	Places	Qualified wrestlers
2015 World Championships	6	Adeline Gray (USA); Zhou Qian (CHN); Epp Mäe (EST); Vasilisa Marzaliuk (BLR); Andrea Olaya (COL); Aline Ferreira (BRA)
Pan American Qualification Tournament	2	Erica Wiebe (CAN); Jaramit Weffer (VEN)
Asian Qualification Tournament	2	Rio Watari (JPN); Guzel Manyurova (KAZ)
African & Oceania Qualification Tournament	2	Annabelle Ali (CMR); Samar Amer (EGY)
European Qualification Tournament	2	Yasemin Adar (TUR); Alla Cherkasova (UKR)
1st World Qualification Tournament	2	Cynthia Vescan (FRA); Zsanett Németh (HUN)
2nd World Qualification Tournament	2	Ekaterina Bukina (RUS); Maria Selmaier (GER)
Invitational / Host Country	0	—
Total	18	
