= 2014 World Wrestling Championships – Men's freestyle 97 kg =

Wrestling event

Men's freestyle 97 kg at the 2014 World Championships
- Venue: Gymnastics Sport Palace
- Dates: 9 September 2014
- Competitors: 31 from 31 nations

Medalists
gold medal	Abdusalam Gadisov	Russia
silver medal	Khetag Gazyumov	Azerbaijan
bronze medal	Javier Cortina	Cuba
bronze medal	Valeriy Andriytsev	Ukraine

The men's freestyle 97 kilograms is a competition featured at the 2014 World Wrestling Championships, and was held in Tashkent, Uzbekistan on 9 September 2014.

This freestyle wrestling competition consisted of a single-elimination tournament, with a repechage used to determine the winners of two bronze medals.

== Results ==
Legend

- F — Won by fall
- WO — Won by walkover

=== Final ===
Final
Abdusalam Gadisov (RUS)	2
Khetag Gazyumov (AZE)	1

=== Top half ===
Round of 32
Zhang Xueyi (CHN)	8
Jozef Jaloviar (SVK)	0
Abdusalam Gadisov (RUS)	12
Arjun Gill (CAN)	2
Yuri Maier (ARG)	4
Javier Cortina (CUB)	14
Seiji Suzuki (JPN)	0
Radosław Baran (POL)	6
Imants Lagodskis (LAT)	4
Şamil Erdoğan (TUR)	4^{F}
Reza Yazdani (IRI)	10
Sumit Malik (IND)	0
Philipp Hutter (SUI)	1
Magomed Musaev (KGZ)	9

Round of 16
Attila Szmik (HUN)	0
Zhang Xueyi (CHN)	6
Abdusalam Gadisov (RUS)	8
Javier Cortina (CUB)	0
Radosław Baran (POL)	0
Şamil Erdoğan (TUR)	10
Reza Yazdani (IRI)	9
Magomed Musaev (KGZ)	3

Quarterfinals
Zhang Xueyi (CHN)	0
Abdusalam Gadisov (RUS)	10
Şamil Erdoğan (TUR)	8
Reza Yazdani (IRI)	0

Semifinals
Abdusalam Gadisov (RUS)	4
Şamil Erdoğan (TUR)	2

=== Bottom half ===
Round of 32
Rustam Iskandari (TJK)	11
Koo Tae-hyun (KOR)	0
Egzon Shala (ALB)	7^{F}
Yusup Jalilau (BLR)	4
Valeriy Andriytsev (UKR)	10
Nurýagdy Karataýew (TKM)	0
Jake Varner (USA)	7
William Harth (GER)	0
Omar Omarov (UZB)
Dorjkhandyn Khüderbulga (MGL)	WO
Yermukambet Inkar (KAZ)	7
Johannes Ludescher (AUT)	1
Nicolae Ceban (MDA)	0
Khetag Gazyumov (AZE)	6
Jesse Ruíz (MEX)	0
Elizbar Odikadze (GEO)	10

Round of 16
Rustam Iskandari (TJK)	2
Egzon Shala (ALB)	9^{F}
Valeriy Andriytsev (UKR)	5
Jake Varner (USA)	3
Dorjkhandyn Khüderbulga (MGL)	12
Yermukambet Inkar (KAZ)	2
Khetag Gazyumov (AZE)	2
Elizbar Odikadze (GEO)	1

Quarterfinals
Egzon Shala (ALB)	2
Valeriy Andriytsev (UKR)	9
Dorjkhandyn Khüderbulga (MGL)	0
Khetag Gazyumov (AZE)	6

Semifinals
Valeriy Andriytsev (UKR)	1
Khetag Gazyumov (AZE)	5

=== Repechage ===
Repechage round 1
Arjun Gill (CAN)	2
Javier Cortina (CUB)	4
Nicolae Ceban (MDA)	2
Elizbar Odikadze (GEO)	2

Repechage round 2
Javier Cortina (CUB)	WO
Zhang Xueyi (CHN)
Elizbar Odikadze (GEO)	3
Dorjkhandyn Khüderbulga (MGL)	2

Bronze medals
Javier Cortina (CUB)	0
Şamil Erdoğan (TUR)	10
Elizbar Odikadze (GEO)	0
Valeriy Andriytsev (UKR)	2^{F}

- Şamil Erdoğan of Turkey originally won the bronze medal, but was disqualified after he tested positive for Stanozolol. Javier Cortina was raised to third and took the bronze medal.
