= 2015 World Wrestling Championships – Men's freestyle 97 kg =

Men's freestyle 97 kg at the 2015 World Championships
- Venue: Orleans Arena
- Dates: 11 September 2015
- Competitors: 37 from 37 nations

Medalists
gold medal	Kyle Snyder	United States
silver medal	Khetag Gazyumov	Azerbaijan
bronze medal	Elizbar Odikadze	Georgia
bronze medal	Pavlo Oliynyk	Ukraine

The men's freestyle 97 kilograms is a competition featured at the 2015 World Wrestling Championships, and was held in Las Vegas, United States on 11 September 2015.

== Results ==
Legend

- F — Won by fall
- WO — Won by walkover

=== Finals ===
Semifinals		Final
Abdusalam Gadisov (RUS)	7
Elizbar Odikadze (GEO)	2	Abdusalam Gadisov (RUS)	5
Kyle Snyder (USA)	6	Kyle Snyder (USA)	5
Abbas Tahan (IRI)	3

Abdusalam Gadisov of Russia originally won the silver medal but was disqualified in 2023 due to doping offenses.

=== Top half ===
==== Section 1 ====
Round of 64

Round of 32
Nicolae Ceban (MDA)	4^{F}
Rustam Iskandari (TJK)	0
Khetag Gazyumov (AZE)	8
Ivan Yankouski (BLR)	0
Stefan Kehrer (GER)	5^{F}
Georgi Sredkov (BUL)	1
Abdusalam Gadisov (RUS)	10
Mausam Khatri (IND)	0

Round of 16
Nicolae Ceban (MDA)	1
Khetag Gazyumov (AZE)	3
Stefan Kehrer (GER)	0
Abdusalam Gadisov (RUS)	10

Quarterfinals
Khetag Gazyumov (AZE)	0
Abdusalam Gadisov (RUS)	5

==== Section 2 ====
Round of 64

Round of 32
Edgar Yenokyan (ARM)	0
Kim Jae-gang (KOR)	5
Attila Szmik (HUN)	3
Ragnar Kaasik (EST)	0
Egzon Shala (ALB)	2
Arjun Gill (CAN)	13
Elizbar Odikadze (GEO)	10^{F}
Yuri Maier (ARG)	0

Round of 16
Kim Jae-gang (KOR)	1
Attila Szmik (HUN)	1
Arjun Gill (CAN)	3
Elizbar Odikadze (GEO)	5

Quarterfinals
Kim Jae-gang (KOR)	2
Elizbar Odikadze (GEO)	4

=== Bottom half ===
==== Section 3 ====
Round of 64

Round of 32
Philipp Hutter (SUI)	0
Alikhan Zhumayev (KAZ)	10
Takeshi Yamaguchi (JPN)	2
José Daniel Díaz (VEN)	4
Radosław Baran (POL)	9
Edon Shala (KOS)	2
Kyle Snyder (USA)	2
Pavlo Oliynyk (UKR)	1

Round of 16
Alikhan Zhumayev (KAZ)	1
José Daniel Díaz (VEN)	3
Radosław Baran (POL)	0
Kyle Snyder (USA)	8

Quarterfinals
José Daniel Díaz (VEN)	1
Kyle Snyder (USA)	11

==== Section 4 ====
Round of 64
Javier Cortina (CUB)	5
Micheil Tsikovani (GRE)	0
Nathanael Rose (TTO)	10
Aurelio Valdez (MEX)	0
Dorjkhandyn Khüderbulga (MGL)	1
İbrahim Bölükbaşı (TUR)	8
Rodney Wilson (ASA)	0
Zhang Xueyi (CHN)	2^{F}
Abbas Tahan (IRI)	4
Jozef Jaloviar (SVK)	0

Round of 32
Imants Lagodskis (LAT)	10
Héctor Rodríguez (ESP)	0
Magomed Musaev (KGZ)	10
Javier Cortina (CUB)	0
Nathanael Rose (TTO)	0
İbrahim Bölükbaşı (TUR)	12
Zhang Xueyi (CHN)	0
Abbas Tahan (IRI)	11

Round of 16
Imants Lagodskis (LAT)	0
Magomed Musaev (KGZ)	5
İbrahim Bölükbaşı (TUR)	2
Abbas Tahan (IRI)	12

Quarterfinals
Magomed Musaev (KGZ)	4
Abbas Tahan (IRI)	5

=== Repechage ===
Repechage round 2
Mausam Khatri (IND)	5
Stefan Kehrer (GER)	6
Pavlo Oliynyk (UKR)	WO
Radosław Baran (POL)

Repechage round 3
Stefan Kehrer (GER)	0
Khetag Gazyumov (AZE)	10
Pavlo Oliynyk (UKR)	10
José Daniel Díaz (VEN)	0

Bronze medals
Khetag Gazyumov (AZE)	4
Elizbar Odikadze (GEO)	1
Pavlo Oliynyk (UKR)	3
Abbas Tahan (IRI)	2
