= Iran at the 2016 Summer Olympics =

- IOC code: IRI
- NOC: National Olympic Committee of the Islamic Republic of Iran
- Website: www.olympic.ir (in Persian and English)

in Rio de Janeiro, Brazil
- Competitors: 63 in 15 sports
- Flag bearer: Zahra Nemati
- Medals Ranked 24th: Gold 3 Silver 1 Bronze 4 Total 8

Summer Olympics appearances (overview)
- 1900; 1904–1936; 1948; 1952; 1956; 1960; 1964; 1968; 1972; 1976; 1980–1984; 1988; 1992; 1996; 2000; 2004; 2008; 2012; 2016; 2020; 2024; 2028

Iran competed at the 2016 Summer Olympics in Rio de Janeiro, from 5 to 21 August 2016. Since the nation's return in 1948 after having made their debut in 1900, Iranian athletes had attended in every Summer Olympic Games of the modern era, with the exception of the 1980 and 1984 Summer Olympics.

The National Olympic Committee of the Islamic Republic of Iran fielded a team of 63 athletes, 54 men and 9 women, across 15 sports at the Games. It was the nation's second-largest delegation sent to the Olympics, and featured Iran's highest female participation in history. Men's volleyball was the only team-based sport in which Iran was represented at the Games, the nation's Olympic debut. Wrestling accounted for the largest number of athletes by an individual-based sport with 12 entries; there was only a single competitor each in archery, boxing, flatwater canoeing, rowing, and swimming.

The Iranian roster featured a number of past Olympic medalists, including discus thrower Ehsan Haddadi, who won the nation's first ever athletics medal with a silver, and four defending champions from London: weightlifter Behdad Salimi, and Greco-Roman wrestlers Hamid Sourian, Omid Norouzi, and Ghasem Rezaei. Other notable Iranian athletes included table tennis player Noshad Alamian and his younger brother Nima in the men's singles, rifle shooter and London 2012 finalist Elaheh Ahmadi, and paraplegic archer Zahra Nemati, who significantly became the nation's first ever female athlete to earn an Olympic or Paralympic title four years earlier. Consequently, Nemati's story and sporting success prompted her to lead the Iranian delegation as the nation's third female flag bearer in Olympic history during the opening ceremony.

Iran left Rio de Janeiro with a total of 8 medals (3 gold, 1 silver, and 4 bronze), finishing twenty-fourth in the overall standings. Five of these medals were awarded to the team in wrestling, two in weightlifting, and one in taekwondo. Among the nation's medalists were taekwondo fighter Kimia Alizadeh, who became the first Iranian woman to stand on the podium by taking the bronze, and weightlifter Kianoush Rostami, who bested his runner-up feat from London, lifting a new world record for gold in the men's 85 kg category.

== Medalists ==
Medal	Name	Sport	Event	Date
Gold	Kianoush Rostami	Weightlifting	Men's 85 kg	August 12
Gold	Sohrab Moradi	Weightlifting	Men's 94 kg	August 13
Gold	Hassan Yazdani	Wrestling	Men's freestyle 74 kg	August 19
Silver	Komeil Ghasemi	Wrestling	Men's freestyle 125 kg	August 20
Bronze	Saeid Abdevali	Wrestling	Men's Greco-Roman 75 kg	August 14
Bronze	Ghasem Rezaei	Wrestling	Men's Greco-Roman 98 kg	August 16
Bronze	Kimia Alizadeh	Taekwondo	Women's 57 kg	August 18
Bronze	Hassan Rahimi	Wrestling	Men's freestyle 57 kg	August 19

Medals by sport
Sport	1st place, gold medalist(s)	2nd place, silver medalist(s)	3rd place, bronze medalist(s)	Total
Weightlifting	2	0	0	2
Wrestling	1	1	3	5
Taekwondo	0	0	1	1
Total	3	1	4	8

Medals by date
Day	Date	1st place, gold medalist(s)	2nd place, silver medalist(s)	3rd place, bronze medalist(s)	Total
Day 1	6 August	0	0	0	0
Day 2	7 August	0	0	0	0
Day 3	8 August	0	0	0	0
Day 4	9 August	0	0	0	0
Day 5	10 August	0	0	0	0
Day 6	11 August	0	0	0	0
Day 7	12 August	1	0	0	1
Day 8	13 August	1	0	0	1
Day 9	14 August	0	0	1	1
Day 10	15 August	0	0	0	0
Day 11	16 August	0	0	1	1
Day 12	17 August	0	0	0	0
Day 13	18 August	0	0	1	1
Day 14	19 August	1	0	1	2
Day 15	20 August	0	1	0	1
Day 16	21 August	0	0	0	0
Total		3	1	4	8

== Competitors ==
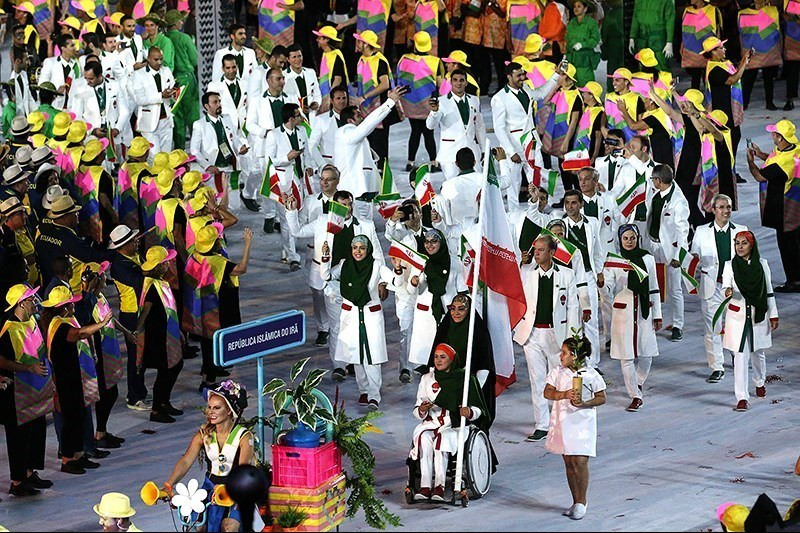
Iranian delegation at the 2016 Summer Olympics

Sport	Men	Women	Total
Archery	0	1	1
Athletics	9	1	10
Boxing	1	0	1
Canoeing	1	0	1
Cycling	3	0	3
Fencing	2	0	2
Judo	2	0	2
Rowing	0	1	1
Shooting	1	4	5
Swimming	1	0	1
Table tennis	2	1	3
Taekwondo	3	1	4
Volleyball	12	0	12
Weightlifting	5	0	5
Wrestling	12	0	12
Total	54	9	63

== Archery ==
One Iranian archer qualified for the women's individual recurve by obtaining one of the three Olympic places available from the 2015 Asian Archery Championships in Bangkok, Thailand.

Athlete	Event	Ranking round		Round of 64	Round of 32	Round of 16	Quarterfinals	Semifinals	Final / BM	
Athlete	Event	Score	Seed	Opposition Score	Opposition Score	Opposition Score	Opposition Score	Opposition Score	Opposition Score	Rank
Zahra Nemati	Women's individual	609	49	Stepanova (RUS); L 2–6	did not advance					

== Athletics ==
Iranian athletes have so far achieved qualifying standards in the following athletics events (up to a maximum of 3 athletes in each event):

Key

- Note–Ranks given for track events are within the athlete's heat only
- Q = Qualified for the next round
- q = Qualified for the next round as a fastest loser or, in field events, by position without achieving the qualifying target
- NR = National record
- N/A = Round not applicable for the event
- Bye = Athlete not required to compete in round

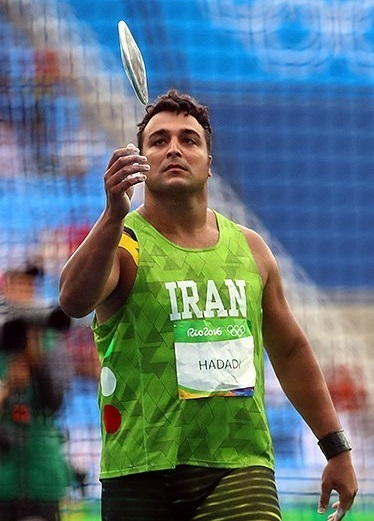
Ehsan Haddadi in men's discus throw.

Track & road events

Athlete	Event	Heat		Quarterfinal		Semifinal		Final	
Athlete	Event	Result	Rank	Result	Rank	Result	Rank	Result	Rank
Reza Ghasemi	Men's 100 m	Bye		10:47	7	did not advance			
Hassan Taftian	Men's 100 m	Bye		10:17	3 q	10:23	8	did not advance	
Mohammad Jafar Moradi	Men's marathon	—N/a						2:31:58	129
Hamid Reza Zouravand	Men's 20 km walk	—N/a						1:27:45	54

Field events

Athlete	Event	Qualification		Final	
Athlete	Event	Distance	Position	Distance	Position
Mohammad Arzandeh	Men's long jump	7.31	29	did not advance	
Ehsan Haddadi	Men's discus throw	60.15	24	did not advance	
Mahmoud Samimi	Men's discus throw	56.94	30	did not advance	
Pezhman Ghalehnoei	Men's hammer throw	69.15	28	did not advance	
Kaveh Mousavi	Men's hammer throw	65.03	29	did not advance	
Leila Rajabi	Women's shot put	16.34	32	did not advance	

== Boxing ==
Iran has entered one boxer to compete in the men's light heavyweight division into the Olympic boxing tournament. 2012 Olympian Ehsan Rouzbahani was the only Iranian finishing among the top two of his respective division in the AIBA Pro Boxing series.

Athlete	Event	Round of 32	Round of 16	Quarterfinals	Semifinals	Final	
Athlete	Event	Opposition Result	Opposition Result	Opposition Result	Opposition Result	Opposition Result	Rank
Ehsan Rouzbahani	Men's light heavyweight	Müllenberg (NED); L 0–3	did not advance				

== Canoeing ==
=== Sprint ===
Iran has received a spare berth from the International Canoe Federation to enter a boat in the men's C-1 200 m to the Olympics, as the next highest-ranked nation, not yet qualified, at the 2015 Canoe Sprint World Championships, and as a response to the forfeiture of five boats held by the Russians due to their previous doping bans and their implications in the "disappearing positive methodology" set out in the McClaren Report on Russia's state-sponsored doping.

Athlete	Event	Heats		Semifinals		Final	
Athlete	Event	Time	Rank	Time	Rank	Time	Rank
Adel Mojallali	Men's C-1 200 m	41.650	4 Q	42.386	6	did not advance	

Qualification Legend: FA = Qualify to final (medal); FB = Qualify to final B (non-medal)

== Cycling ==
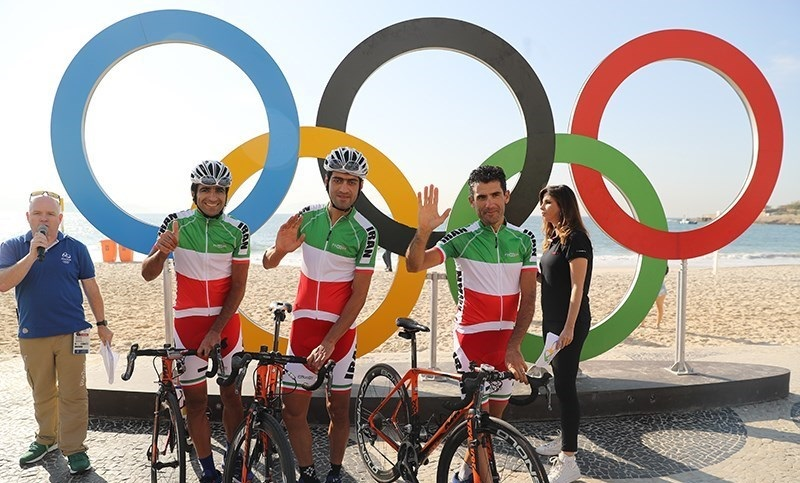
Iranian cycling team at the 2016 Summer Olympics.

=== Road ===
Iranian riders qualified for a maximum of three quota places in the men's Olympic road race by virtue of their top 4 national ranking in the 2015 UCI Asia Tour.

Athlete	Event	Time	Rank
Ghader Mizbani	Men's road race	did not finish	
Ghader Mizbani	Men's time trial	1:21:39.45	31
Arvin Moazzami	Men's road race	did not finish	
Samad Pourseyedi	Men's road race	did not finish	

== Fencing ==
Following the completion of the Grand Prix finals, Iran has entered two fencers into the Olympic competition. Sabre fencers Ali Pakdaman and 2012 Olympian Mojtaba Abedini had claimed their spots on the Iranian team by finishing among the top 14 individuals in the FIE Adjusted Official Rankings.

Athlete	Event	Round of 32	Round of 16	Quarterfinal	Semifinal	Final / BM	
Athlete	Event	Opposition Score	Opposition Score	Opposition Score	Opposition Score	Opposition Score	Rank
Mojtaba Abedini	Men's sabre	Yahodka (UKR); W 15–9	Gu B-g (KOR); W 15–12	Anstett (FRA); W 15–13	Homer (USA); L 14–15	Kim J-h (KOR); L 8–15	4
Ali Pakdaman	Men's sabre	Szabo (GER); L 11–15	did not advance				

== Judo ==
Iran has qualified three judokas for each of the following weight classes at the Games. London 2012 Olympian Javad Mahjoub was ranked among the top 22 eligible judokas for men in the IJF World Ranking List of May 30, 2016, while Alireza Khojasteh at men's half-lightweight (66 kg) earned a continental quota spot from the Asian region, as the highest-ranked Iranian judoka outside of direct qualifying position. Khojasteh subsequently withdrew from the Olympics before the opening ceremony.

Athlete	Event	Round of 64	Round of 32	Round of 16	Quarterfinals	Semifinals	Repechage	Final / BM	
Athlete	Event	Opposition Result	Opposition Result	Opposition Result	Opposition Result	Opposition Result	Opposition Result	Opposition Result	Rank
Saeid Mollaei	Men's −81 kg	Bye	Khalmurzaev (RUS); L 000–000 S	did not advance					
Javad Mahjoub	Men's −100 kg	Bye	Nikiforov (BEL); L 000–100	did not advance					

== Rowing ==
Iran has qualified one boat in the women's single sculls for the Olympics at the 2016 Asia & Oceania Continental Qualification Regatta in Chungju, South Korea.

Athlete	Event	Heats		Repechage		Quarterfinals		Semifinals		Final	
Athlete	Event	Time	Rank	Time	Rank	Time	Rank	Time	Rank	Time	Rank
Mahsa Javar	Women's single sculls	8:39.28	4 R	8:06.57	3 SE/F	Bye		8:45.54	2 FE	8:43.34	28

Qualification Legend: FA=Final A (medal); FB=Final B (non-medal); FC=Final C (non-medal); FD=Final D (non-medal); FE=Final E (non-medal); FF=Final F (non-medal); SA/B=Semifinals A/B; SC/D=Semifinals C/D; SE/F=Semifinals E/F; QF=Quarterfinals; R=Repechage

== Shooting ==
Iranian shooters have achieved quota places for the following events by virtue of their best finishes at the 2015 ISSF World Cup series, and Asian Championships, as long as they obtained a minimum qualifying score (MQS) by March 31, 2016.

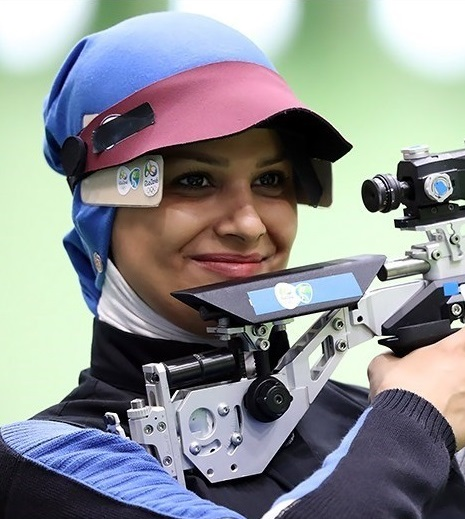
Elaheh Ahmadi finished sixth in women's 10 m air rifle final.

Athlete	Event	Qualification		Semifinal		Final	
Athlete	Event	Points	Rank	Points	Rank	Points	Rank
Pouria Norouzian	Men's 10 m air rifle	622.2	22	—N/a		did not advance	
Pouria Norouzian	Men's 50 m rifle 3 positions	1168	26	—N/a		did not advance	
Elaheh Ahmadi	Women's 10 m air rifle	417.8	3 Q	—N/a		122.5	6
Mahlagha Jambozorg	Women's 50 m rifle 3 positions	574	27	—N/a		did not advance	
Najmeh Khedmati	Women's 10 m air rifle	415.7	11	—N/a		did not advance	
Najmeh Khedmati	Women's 50 m rifle 3 positions	583	6 Q	—N/a		402.3	8
Golnoush Sebghatollahi	Women's 10 m air pistol	379	21	—N/a		did not advance	
Golnoush Sebghatollahi	Women's 25 m pistol	572	28	did not advance			

Qualification Legend: Q = Qualify for the next round; q = Qualify for the bronze medal (shotgun)

== Swimming ==
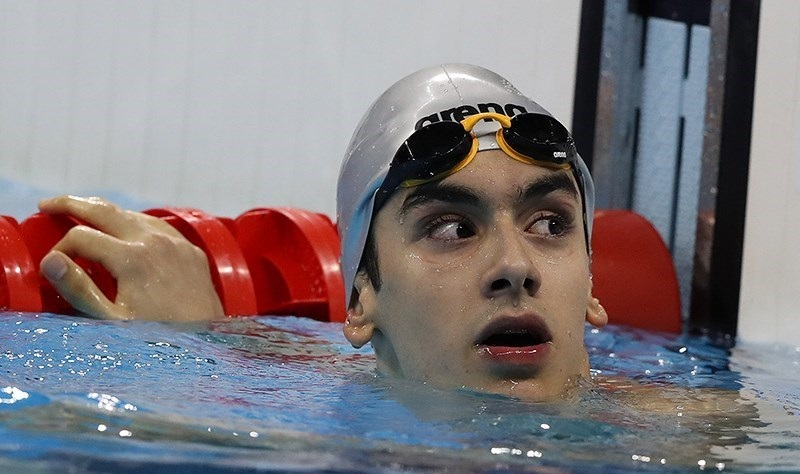
Iran's only swimmer in Rio 2016, Arya Nasimi Shad.

Iran has received a Universality invitation from FINA to send a male swimmer to the Olympics.

Athlete	Event	Heat		Semifinal		Final	
Athlete	Event	Time	Rank	Time	Rank	Time	Rank
Arya Nasimi Shad	Men's 200 m breaststroke	2:20.18	39	did not advance			

== Table tennis ==
Iran has entered three athletes into the table tennis competition at the Games. Nima Alamian and 2012 Olympian Neda Shahsavari secured the Olympic spot each in the men's and women's singles as the highest-ranked table tennis player coming from the Middle Asia zone, while Nima's elder brother Noshad Alamian scored a second-stage victory to take the remaining spot on the Iranian team at the Asian Qualification Tournament in Hong Kong.

Athlete	Event	Preliminary	Round 1	Round 2	Round 3	Round of 16	Quarterfinals	Semifinals	Final / BM	
Athlete	Event	Opposition Result	Opposition Result	Opposition Result	Opposition Result	Opposition Result	Opposition Result	Opposition Result	Opposition Result	Rank
Nima Alamian	Men's singles	Jha (USA); W 4–1	Ionescu (ROU); L 1–4	did not advance						
Noshad Alamian	Men's singles	Bye	Tokič (SLO); L 1–4	did not advance						
Neda Shahsavari	Women's singles	Bye	Privalova (BLR); L 3–4	did not advance						

== Taekwondo ==
Iran entered four athletes into the taekwondo competition at the Olympics. Farzan Ashourzadeh, Mehdi Khodabakhshi, and Sajjad Mardani qualified automatically for their respective weight classes by finishing in the top 6 WTF Olympic rankings. Meanwhile, Kimia Alizadeh was the only Iranian female finishing among the top two in the women's lightweight category (57 kg) at the 2016 Asian Qualification Tournament in Manila, Philippines.

Athlete	Event	Round of 16	Quarterfinals	Semifinals	Repechage	Final / BM	
Athlete	Event	Opposition Result	Opposition Result	Opposition Result	Opposition Result	Opposition Result	Rank
Farzan Ashourzadeh	Men's −58 kg	Hajjami (MAR); L 3–4	did not advance				
Mehdi Khodabakhshi	Men's −80 kg	Ferrera (HON); W 13–1 PTG	Beigi (AZE); L 5–17 PTG	did not advance			
Sajjad Mardani	Men's +80 kg	Taufatofua (TGA); W 16–1 PTG	Cho (GBR); L 3–4 SUD	did not advance			
Kimia Alizadeh	Women's −57 kg	Zaninović (CRO); W 7–6	Calvo (ESP); L 7–8	Did not advance	Harnsujin (THA); W 14–10	Glasnović (SWE); W 5–1	3rd place, bronze medalist(s)

== Volleyball ==
=== Indoor ===
==== Men's tournament ====
Iran men's volleyball team qualified for the Olympics by picking up the continental spot as the highest-ranked Asian team at the first meet of the World Olympic Qualifying Tournament in Tokyo, Japan, signifying the nation's Olympic debut in the sport.

Team roster

The following is the Iran roster in the men's volleyball tournament of the 2016 Summer Olympics.

Head coach: (Argentina) Raúl Lozano

No.	Name	Date of birth	Height	Weight	Spike	Block	2015–16 club
1	Shahram Mahmoudi	20 July 1988	1.98 m (6 ft 6 in)	95 kg (209 lb)	347 cm (137 in)	332 cm (131 in)	(Iran) Sarmayeh Bank Tehran
2	Milad Ebadipour	17 October 1993	1.96 m (6 ft 5 in)	78 kg (172 lb)	350 cm (140 in)	310 cm (120 in)	(Iran) Shahrdari Urmia
4	Saeid Marouf (c)	20 October 1985	1.89 m (6 ft 2 in)	81 kg (179 lb)	331 cm (130 in)	311 cm (122 in)	(Iran) Shahrdari Urmia
5	Farhad Ghaemi	28 August 1989	1.97 m (6 ft 6 in)	73 kg (161 lb)	355 cm (140 in)	335 cm (132 in)	(Iran) Paykan Tehran
6	Mohammad Mousavi	22 August 1987	2.03 m (6 ft 8 in)	86 kg (190 lb)	362 cm (143 in)	344 cm (135 in)	(Iran) Sarmayeh Bank Tehran
7	Hamzeh Zarini	18 October 1985	1.98 m (6 ft 6 in)	98 kg (216 lb)	351 cm (138 in)	330 cm (130 in)	(Iran) Kalleh Mazandaran
9	Adel Gholami	9 February 1986	1.95 m (6 ft 5 in)	88 kg (194 lb)	341 cm (134 in)	330 cm (130 in)	(Iran) Sarmayeh Bank Tehran
10	Amir Ghafour	6 June 1991	2.02 m (6 ft 8 in)	90 kg (200 lb)	354 cm (139 in)	334 cm (131 in)	(Iran) Paykan Tehran
12	Mojtaba Mirzajanpour	7 October 1991	2.05 m (6 ft 9 in)	88 kg (194 lb)	355 cm (140 in)	348 cm (137 in)	(Iran) Paykan Tehran
13	Mehdi Mahdavi	13 February 1984	1.91 m (6 ft 3 in)	96 kg (212 lb)	330 cm (130 in)	310 cm (120 in)	(Iran) Sarmayeh Bank Tehran
15	Mostafa Sharifat	16 September 1987	2.04 m (6 ft 8 in)	85 kg (187 lb)	332 cm (131 in)	313 cm (123 in)	(Iran) Matin Varamin
19	Mehdi Marandi (L)	12 May 1986	1.72 m (5 ft 8 in)	69 kg (152 lb)	295 cm (116 in)	280 cm (110 in)	(Iran) Paykan Tehran

Group play

Pos	Team	Pld	W	L	Pts	SW	SL	SR	SPW	SPL	SPR	Qualification
1	Argentina	5	4	1	12	12	4	3.000	394	335	1.176	Quarterfinals
2	Poland	5	4	1	12	14	5	2.800	447	389	1.149	Quarterfinals
3	Russia	5	4	1	11	13	6	2.167	432	367	1.177	Quarterfinals
4	Iran	5	2	3	7	8	9	0.889	389	392	0.992	Quarterfinals
5	Egypt	5	1	4	3	3	12	0.250	286	362	0.790	
6	Cuba	5	0	5	0	1	15	0.067	300	403	0.744	

Source: FIVB
Rules for classification: Tiebreakers

7 August 2016; 22:35	Argentina	3–0	Iran	Ginásio do Maracanãzinho, Rio de Janeiro; Attendance: 6,460; Referees: Fabrizio Pasquali (ITA), Liu Jiang (CHN)
7 August 2016; 22:35	(25–23, 26–24, 25–18); Results Statistics			Ginásio do Maracanãzinho, Rio de Janeiro; Attendance: 6,460; Referees: Fabrizio Pasquali (ITA), Liu Jiang (CHN)

9 August 2016; 17:35	Poland	3–2	Iran	Ginásio do Maracanãzinho, Rio de Janeiro; Attendance: 7,227; Referees: Paulo Turci (BRA), Susana Rodríguez (ESP)
9 August 2016; 17:35	(25–17, 25–23, 23–25, 20–25, 18–16); Results Statistics			Ginásio do Maracanãzinho, Rio de Janeiro; Attendance: 7,227; Referees: Paulo Turci (BRA), Susana Rodríguez (ESP)

11 August 2016; 09:30	Iran	3–0	Cuba	Ginásio do Maracanãzinho, Rio de Janeiro; Attendance: 6,625; Referees: Fabrizio Pasquali (ITA), Juray Mokrý (SVK)
11 August 2016; 09:30	(25–21, 31–29, 25–16); Results Statistics			Ginásio do Maracanãzinho, Rio de Janeiro; Attendance: 6,625; Referees: Fabrizio Pasquali (ITA), Juray Mokrý (SVK)

13 August 2016; 09:30	Iran	3–0	Egypt	Ginásio do Maracanãzinho, Rio de Janeiro; Attendance: 6,262; Referees: Andrey Zenovich (RUS), Rogerio Espicalsky (BRA)
13 August 2016; 09:30	(28–26, 25–22, 25–16); Results Statistics			Ginásio do Maracanãzinho, Rio de Janeiro; Attendance: 6,262; Referees: Andrey Zenovich (RUS), Rogerio Espicalsky (BRA)

15 August 2016; 15:00	Russia	3–0	Iran	Ginásio do Maracanãzinho, Rio de Janeiro; Attendance: 7,387; Referees: Liu Jiang (CHN), Fabrizio Pasquali (ITA)
15 August 2016; 15:00	(25–23, 25–16, 25–20); Results Statistics			Ginásio do Maracanãzinho, Rio de Janeiro; Attendance: 7,387; Referees: Liu Jiang (CHN), Fabrizio Pasquali (ITA)

Quarterfinal

17 August 2016; 18:00	Italy	3–0	Iran	Ginásio do Maracanãzinho, Rio de Janeiro; Attendance: 7,213; Referees: Denny Cespedes (DOM), Juraj Mokrý (SVK)
17 August 2016; 18:00	(31–29, 25–19, 25–17); Results Statistics			Ginásio do Maracanãzinho, Rio de Janeiro; Attendance: 7,213; Referees: Denny Cespedes (DOM), Juraj Mokrý (SVK)

== Weightlifting ==
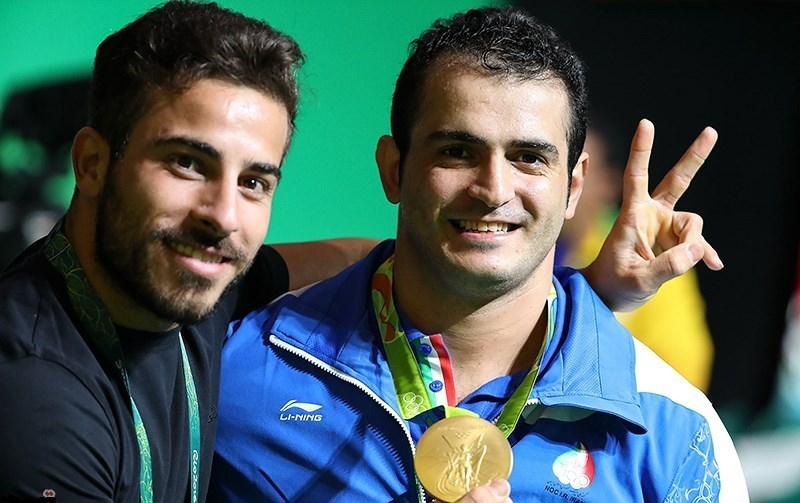
Iran's gold medalists Kianoush Rostami and Sohrab Moradi in weightlifting

Iranian weightlifters have qualified five men's quota places for the Rio Olympics based on their combined team standing by points at the 2014 and 2015 IWF World Championships. The team must allocate these places to individual athletes by June 20, 2016.

Athlete	Event	Snatch		Clean & Jerk		Total	Rank
Athlete	Event	Result	Rank	Result	Rank	Total	Rank
Kianoush Rostami	Men's −85 kg	179	1	217	1	396 WR	1st place, gold medalist(s)
Ali Hashemi	Men's −94 kg	173	7	210	7	383	7
Sohrab Moradi	Men's −94 kg	182	1	221	1	403	1st place, gold medalist(s)
Mohammad Reza Barari	Men's −105 kg	186	6	220	6	406	6
Behdad Salimi	Men's +105 kg	216 WR	1	~~245~~	DNF	216	DNF

== Wrestling ==
Iran has qualified a total of twelve wrestlers for each the following weight classes into the Olympic competition. Majority of Olympic berths were awarded to Iranian wrestlers, who finished among the top six at the 2015 World Championships, while two other wrestlers progressed to the top two finals to book Olympic spots each in the men's freestyle 130 kg and men's Greco-Roman 66 kg at the 2016 Asian Qualification Tournament.

Two further wrestlers had claimed the remaining Olympic slots to round out the Iranian roster in separate World Qualification Tournaments; one of them in men's Greco Roman 120 kg at the initial meet in Ulaanbaatar, and the other in men's Greco-Roman 59 kg at the final meet in Istanbul.

Key:

- VT – Victory by fall.
- PP – Decision by points – the loser with technical points.
- PO – Decision by points – the loser without technical points.
- ST – Great superiority – the loser without technical points and a margin of victory of at least 8 (Greco-Roman) or 10 (freestyle) points.

Men's freestyle

Athlete	Event	Qualification	Round of 16	Quarterfinal	Semifinal	Repechage 1	Repechage 2	Final / BM	
Athlete	Event	Opposition Result	Opposition Result	Opposition Result	Opposition Result	Opposition Result	Opposition Result	Opposition Result	Rank
Hassan Rahimi	−57 kg	Bye	Mnatsakanyan (ARM); W 4–0 ^{ST}	Lebedev (RUS); W 3–1 ^{PP}	Higuchi (JPN); L 1–3 ^{PP}	Bye		Bonne (CUB); W 5–0 ^{VT}	3rd place, bronze medalist(s)
Meisam Nasiri	−65 kg	Novachkov (BUL); L 1–3 ^{PP}	did not advance						15
Hassan Yazdani	−74 kg	Bye	Castelly (HAI); W 4–0 ^{ST}	Demirtaş (TUR); W 3–0 ^{PO}	Usserbayev (KAZ); W 4–0 ^{ST}	Bye		Geduev (RUS); W 3–1 ^{PP}	1st place, gold medalist(s)
Alireza Karimi	−86 kg	Saadaoui (TUN); W 3–0 ^{PO}	Ganev (BUL); W 3–1 ^{PP}	Cox (USA); L 1–3 ^{PP}	did not advance				7
Reza Yazdani	−97 kg	Bölükbaşı (TUR); W 4–0 ^{ST}	Gazyumov (AZE); L 1–3 ^{PP}	did not advance		Baran (POL); W 3–1 ^{PP}	Ibragimov (UZB); L 0–5 ^{VT}	Did not advance	7
Komeil Ghasemi	−125 kg	Jarvis (CAN); W 3–1 ^{PP}	Kamal (EGY); W 3–0 ^{PO}	Petriashvili (GEO); W 3–1 ^{PP}	Dlagnev (USA); W 4–0 ^{ST}	Bye		Akgül (TUR); L 1–3 ^{PP}	2nd place, silver medalist(s)

Men's Greco-Roman

Athlete	Event	Qualification	Round of 16	Quarterfinal	Semifinal	Repechage 1	Repechage 2	Final / BM	
Athlete	Event	Opposition Result	Opposition Result	Opposition Result	Opposition Result	Opposition Result	Opposition Result	Opposition Result	Rank
Hamid Sourian	−59 kg	Ota (JPN); L 1–3 ^{PP}	did not advance			Kebispayev (KAZ); L 0–5 ^{VT}	did not advance		11
Omid Norouzi	−66 kg	Bye	Rivas (VEN); W 3–1 ^{PP}	Bolkvadze (GEO); L 0–3 ^{PO}	did not advance				10
Saeid Abdevali	−75 kg	Bye	Madsen (DEN); L 1–3 ^{PP}	did not advance		Bye	Nemeš (SRB); W 3–1 ^{PP}	Bácsi (HUN); W 3–1 ^{PP}	3rd place, bronze medalist(s)
Habibollah Akhlaghi	−85 kg	Berg (SWE); W 4–0 ^{ST}	Chakvetadze (RUS); L 0–5 ^{VT}	did not advance		Tahmasebi (AZE); W 3–1 ^{PP}	Kudla (GER); L 1–3 ^{PP}	Did not advance	7
Ghasem Rezaei	−98 kg	Bye	Pérez (VEN); W 4–0 ^{ST}	Lugo (CUB); L 0–3 ^{PO}	Did not advance	Bye	Xiao D (CHN); W 3–0 ^{PO}	Schön (SWE); W 3–1 ^{PP}	3rd place, bronze medalist(s)
Bashir Babajanzadeh	−130 kg	Bye	Meng Q (CHN); W 3–1 ^{PP}	Popp (GER); L 3–1 ^{PP}	did not advance				10

== Referees and Officials ==
Among the Iranian representatives in Rio 2016 Olympics, Alireza Faghani, Reza Sokhandan and Mohammadreza Mansouri were the Football referees, and Iman Farzin appointed as the only Iranian official in Press Operations for Badminton Games.

== See also ==
- Iran at the 2016 Summer Paralympics
