= Wrestling at the 2016 Summer Olympics – Men's freestyle 97 kg =

Men's freestyle 97 kg at the Games of the XXXI Olympiad
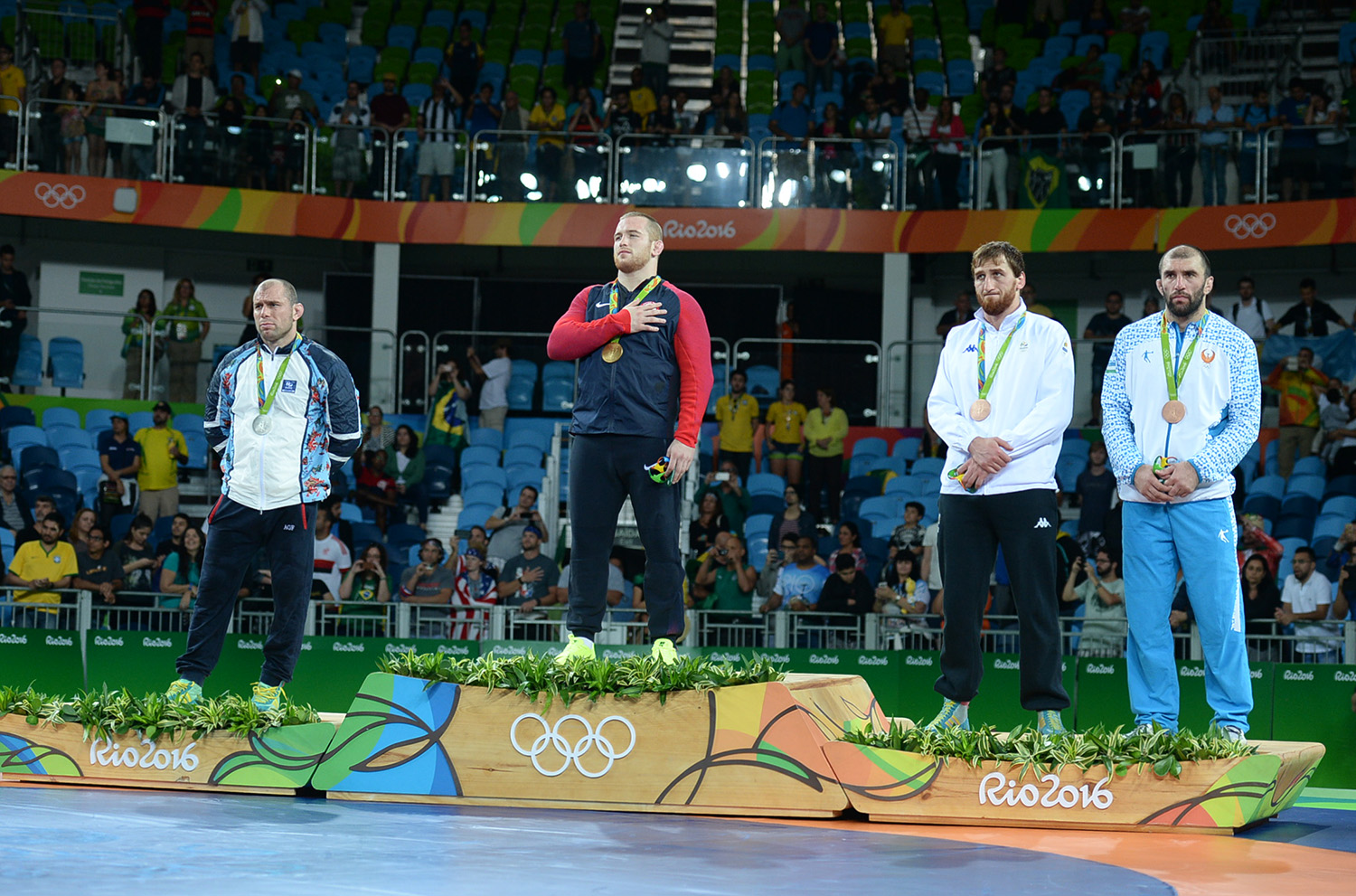
- Medalists
- Venue: Carioca Arena 2
- Date: 21 August 2016
- Competitors: 19 from 19 nations

Medalists
1st place, gold medalist(s)		Kyle Snyder	United States
2nd place, silver medalist(s)		Khetag Gazyumov	Azerbaijan
3rd place, bronze medalist(s)		Albert Saritov	Romania
3rd place, bronze medalist(s)		Magomed Ibragimov	Uzbekistan

Men's freestyle 97 kilograms competition at the 2016 Summer Olympics in Rio de Janeiro, Brazil, took place on August 21 at the Carioca Arena 2 in Barra da Tijuca.

This freestyle wrestling competition consists of a single-elimination tournament, with a repechage used to determine the winner of two bronze medals. The two finalists face off for gold and silver medals. Each wrestler who loses to one of the two finalists moves into the repechage, culminating in a pair of bronze medal matches featuring the semifinal losers each facing the remaining repechage opponent from their half of the bracket.

Each bout consists of a single round within a six-minute limit. The wrestler who scores more points is the winner.

== Schedule ==
All times are Brasília Standard Time (UTC−03:00)

Date	Time	Event
21 August 2016	08:30	Qualification rounds
21 August 2016	13:00	Repechage
21 August 2016	13:45	Finals

== Results ==
Legend

- F — Won by fall
- WO — Won by walkover

=== Final ===
Final
Kyle Snyder (USA)	2
Khetag Gazyumov (AZE)	1

=== Top half ===
Qualifications

1/8 finals
Kyle Snyder (USA)	10
Javier Cortina (CUB)	3
Albert Saritov (ROU)	5
Nicolae Ceban (MDA)	2
José Daniel Díaz (VEN)	0
Mamed Ibragimov (KAZ)	11
Elizbar Odikadze (GEO)	8
Georgy Ketoev (ARM)	1

1/4 finals
Kyle Snyder (USA)	7
Albert Saritov (ROU)	0
Mamed Ibragimov (KAZ)	1
Elizbar Odikadze (GEO)	6

Semifinals
Kyle Snyder (USA)	9
Elizbar Odikadze (GEO)	4

=== Bottom half ===
Qualifications
Magomed Ibragimov (UZB)	WO
Bedopassa Buassat (GBS)
Reza Yazdani (IRI)	10
İbrahim Bölükbaşı (TUR)	0
Radosław Baran (POL)	0
Khetag Gazyumov (AZE)	3

1/8 finals
Dorjkhandyn Khüderbulga (MGL)	0
Magomed Musaev (KGZ)	9
Valeriy Andriytsev (UKR)	8
Anzor Boltukaev (RUS)	5
Soso Tamarau (NGR)	0
Magomed Ibragimov (UZB)	13
Reza Yazdani (IRI)	1
Khetag Gazyumov (AZE)	2

1/4 finals
Magomed Musaev (KGZ)	2
Valeriy Andriytsev (UKR)	5
Magomed Ibragimov (UZB)	3
Khetag Gazyumov (AZE)	12

Semifinals
Valeriy Andriytsev (UKR)	0
Khetag Gazyumov (AZE)	11

=== Repechage ===
Repechage round 1
Radosław Baran (POL)	2
Reza Yazdani (IRI)	5

Repechage round 2
Javier Cortina (CUB)	1
Albert Saritov (ROU)	8
Reza Yazdani (IRI)	0
Magomed Ibragimov (UZB)	5^{F}

Bronze medals
Albert Saritov (ROU)	10
Elizbar Odikadze (GEO)	0
Magomed Ibragimov (UZB)	6
Valeriy Andriytsev (UKR)	4

== Final standing ==
Rank	Athlete
1st place, gold medalist(s)	Kyle Snyder (USA)
2nd place, silver medalist(s)	Khetag Gazyumov (AZE)
3rd place, bronze medalist(s)	Albert Saritov (ROU)
3rd place, bronze medalist(s)	Magomed Ibragimov (UZB)
5	Elizbar Odikadze (GEO)
5	Valeriy Andriytsev (UKR)
7	Reza Yazdani (IRI)
8	Mamed Ibragimov (KAZ)
9	Magomed Musaev (KGZ)
10	Javier Cortina (CUB)
11	Anzor Boltukaev (RUS)
12	Nicolae Ceban (MDA)
13	Radosław Baran (POL)
14	Georgy Ketoev (ARM)
15	Bedopassa Buassat (GBS)
16	Dorjkhandyn Khüderbulga (MGL)
17	İbrahim Bölükbaşı (TUR)
18	José Daniel Díaz (VEN)
19	Soso Tamarau (NGR)
