= Wrestling at the 2015 European Games – Men's freestyle 97 kg =

Men's freestyle 97 kg at the 2015 European Games
- Venue: Heydar Aliyev Arena
- Date: 17 June
- Competitors: 20 from 20 nations

Medalists
gold medal	Khetag Gazyumov	Azerbaijan
silver medal	Elizbar Odikadze	Georgia
bronze medal	Valeriy Andriytsev	Ukraine
bronze medal	Abdusalam Gadisov	Russia

Men's freestyle 97 kg competition at the 2015 European Games in Baku, Azerbaijan, took place on 17 June at the Heydar Aliyev Arena.

== Schedule ==
All times are Azerbaijan Summer Time (UTC+05:00)

Date	Time	Event
Wednesday, 17 June 2015	10:00	Qualifications
Wednesday, 17 June 2015	11:00	1/8 finals
Wednesday, 17 June 2015	13:00	Quarterfinals
Wednesday, 17 June 2015	13:00	Semifinals
Wednesday, 17 June 2015	15:00	Repechage
Wednesday, 17 June 2015	19:00	Finals

== Results ==
Legend

- F — Won by fall

=== Final ===
Final
Elizbar Odikadze (GEO)	1
Khetag Gazyumov (AZE)	3

=== Top half ===
Qualifications

1/8 finals
Dragomir Stoychev (BUL)	1
İbrahim Bölükbaşı (TUR)	7
Valeriy Andriytsev (UKR)	10
Micheil Tsikovani (GRE)	3
Philipp Hutter (SUI)	3
Jozef Jaloviar (SVK)	8
Elizbar Odikadze (GEO)	13
Mindaugas Rumbutis (LTU)	3

Quarterfinals
İbrahim Bölükbaşı (TUR)	1
Valeriy Andriytsev (UKR)	5
Jozef Jaloviar (SVK)	2
Elizbar Odikadze (GEO)	6

Semifinals
Valeriy Andriytsev (UKR)	3
Elizbar Odikadze (GEO)	4

=== Bottom half ===
Qualifications
Nicolai Ceban (MDA)	11
Johannes Ludescher (AUT)	1
Radosław Baran (POL)	0
Khetag Gazyumov (AZE)	10
Attila Szmik (HUN)	3
Georg Seregelyi (GER)	1
Ragnar Kaasik (EST)	0
Ibrahim Saidov (BLR)	10

1/8 finals
Abdusalam Gadisov (RUS)	11
Edon Shala (KOS)	0
Jere Heino (FIN)	1
Imants Lagodskis (LAT)	4
Nicolai Ceban (MDA)	0
Khetag Gazyumov (AZE)	4
Attila Szmik (HUN)	0
Ibrahim Saidov (BLR)	5

Quarterfinals
Abdusalam Gadisov (RUS)	10
Imants Lagodskis (LAT)	0
Khetag Gazyumov (AZE)	2
Ibragim Saidov (BLR)	1

Semifinals
Abdusalam Gadisov (RUS)	2
Khetag Gazyumov (AZE)	4

=== Repechage ===
Repechage round 1
Radosław Baran (POL)	6
Nicolai Ceban (MDA)	0

Repechage round 2
Mindaugas Rumbutis (LTU)	2
Jozef Jaloviar (SVK)	5
Radosław Baran (POL)	4
Ibragim Saidov (BLR)	3

Bronze medal match
Jozef Jaloviar (SVK)	0
Valeriy Andriytsev (UKR)	10
Radosław Baran (POL)	0
Abdusalam Gadisov (RUS)	4
