= 2014 European Wrestling Championships – Men's freestyle 97 kg =

The men's freestyle 97 kg is a competition featured at the 2014 European Wrestling Championships, and was held in Vantaa, Finland on April 1.

== Medalists ==
| Gold | Abdusalam Gadisov; Russia |
| Silver | Khetag Gazyumov; Azerbaijan |
| Bronze | Ivan Yankouski; Belarus |
| Bronze | Nicolai Ceban; Moldova |

== Results ==
Legend

- F — Won by fall

=== Final ===
| Final |
| Khetag Gazyumov (AZE) | 1 |
| Abdusalam Gadisov (RUS) | 5 |

=== Top half ===
Round of 32

Round of 16
Kamil Skaskiewicz (POL) | 6
Imants Lagodskis (LAT) | 3
Ivan Yankouski (BLR) | 0
Khetag Gazyumov (AZE) | 7
Edgar Yenokyan (ARM) | 10
Jozef Jaloviar (SVK) | 0
Simus Norkus (LTU) | 0
Pavlo Oliinyk (UKR) | 12

Quarterfinals
Kamil Skaskiewicz (POL) | 2
Khetag Gazyumov (AZE) | 6
Edgar Yenokyan (ARM) | 1
Pavlo Oliinyk (UKR) | 2

Semifinals
Khetag Gazyumov (AZE) | 4
Pavlo Oliinyk (UKR) | 0

=== Bottom half ===
Round of 32
Philipp Ludescher (AUT) | 1
Héctor Rodríguez (ESP) | 10
Attila Szmik (HUN) | 8
Egzon Shala (ALB) | 1
Jere Heino (FIN) | 1
Abdusalam Gadisov (RUS) | 12
Dato Kerashvili (GEO) | 1
William Harth (GER) | 2

Round of 16
Nicolai Ceban (MDA) | 10
Philipp Hutter (SUI) | 1
Rıza Yıldırım (TUR) | 2
Lyuben Iliev (BUL) | 5
Héctor Rodríguez (ESP) | 0
Attila Szmik (HUN) | 10
Abdusalam Gadisov (RUS) | 10
William Harth (GER) | 0

Quarterfinals
Nicolai Ceban (MDA) | 9
Lyuben Iliev (BUL) | 6
Attila Szmik (HUN) | 1
Abdusalam Gadisov (RUS) | 8

Semifinals
Nicolai Ceban (MDA) | 0
Abdusalam Gadisov (RUS) | 11

=== Repechage ===
Repechage round 1
Jere Heino (FIN) | 1
William Harth (GER) | 4

Repechage round 2
Ivan Yankouski (BLR) | 10
Kamil Skaskiewicz (POL) | 0
William Harth (GER) | 3
Attila Szmik (HUN) | 1

Bronze medals
Ivan Yankouski (BLR) | 3
Pavlo Oliinyk (UKR) | 1
William Harth (GER) | 3
Nicolai Ceban (MDA) | 9
