= 2016 European Wrestling Olympic Qualification Tournament =

The 2016 Olympic Wrestling European Qualification Tournament was the fourth regional qualifying tournament for the 2016 Olympics. It was held between 15–17 April 2016 in Zrenjanin, Serbia.

The top two wrestlers in each weight class earn a qualification spot for their nation.

== Men's freestyle ==
=== 57 kg ===
15 April

Round of 32
Marcel Ewald (GER)	1–8	Labazan Askerbiev (MKD)

Round of 16
James Mancini (ITA)	4
Garnik Mnatsakanyan (ARM)	6
Vasyl Shuptar (UKR)	7
Süleyman Atlı (TUR)	10
Asadulla Lachinau (BLR)	6
Makhmud Magomedov (AZE)	8
Yuriy Holub (ISR)	4
Anatolii Buruian (MDA)	4
József Molnár (HUN)	3
Andrei Dukov (ROU)	7
Adrian Hajduk (POL)	1
Zoheir El-Ouarraqe (FRA)	6
Levan Metreveli (ESP)	8
Randy Vock (SUI)	0
Vladimir Dubov (BUL)	10
Labazan Askerbiev (MKD)	0

Quarterfinals
Garnik Mnatsakanyan (ARM)	10^{F}
Süleyman Atlı (TUR)	6
Makhmud Magomedov (AZE)	7
Anatolii Buruian (MDA)	8
Andrei Dukov (ROU)	0
Zoheir El-Ouarraqe (FRA)	3
Levan Metreveli (ESP)	0
Vladimir Dubov (BUL)	10

Semifinals
Garnik Mnatsakanyan (ARM)	5
Anatolii Buruian (MDA)	3
Zoheir El-Ouarraqe (FRA)	0
Vladimir Dubov (BUL)	12

Final
Garnik Mnatsakanyan (ARM)	0
Vladimir Dubov (BUL)	10

Repechage round 2
James Mancini (ITA)
Süleyman Atlı (TUR)	WO
Labazan Askerbiev (MKD)	4
Levan Metreveli (ESP)	5

Bronze medals
Süleyman Atlı (TUR)	12
Anatolii Buruian (MDA)	0
Levan Metreveli (ESP)	4
Zoheir El-Ouarraqe (FRA)	1

=== 65 kg ===
15 April

Round of 16
Andrei Prepeliţă (MDA)	0
Mustafa Kaya (TUR)	6
Zurabi Iakobishvili (GEO)	6
Alexander Semisorow (GER)	5
Azamat Nurykau (BLR)	4
David Habat (SLO)	4
Andriy Kviatkovskyi (UKR)	10
Nikos Arzoumanidis (GRE)	0
Dejan Mitrov (MKD)	4
George Bucur (ROU)	13
Norbert Lukács (HUN)	0
David Safaryan (ARM)	10
Borislav Novachkov (BUL)	10
Steven Graf (SUI)	0
Magomedmurad Gadzhiev (POL)	10
Maximilian Ausserleitner (AUT)	0

Quarterfinals
Mustafa Kaya (TUR)	10
Zurabi Iakobishvili (GEO)	11
Azamat Nurykau (BLR)	4
Andriy Kviatkovskyi (UKR)	6
George Bucur (ROU)	0
David Safaryan (ARM)	9
Borislav Novachkov (BUL)	0
Magomedmurad Gadzhiev (POL)	7

Semifinals
Zurabi Iakobishvili (GEO)	2
Andriy Kviatkovskyi (UKR)	3
David Safaryan (ARM)	2
Magomedmurad Gadzhiev (POL)	7

Final
Andriy Kviatkovskyi (UKR)	0
Magomedmurad Gadzhiev (POL)	4

Repechage round 1
Nikos Arzoumanidis (GRE)	WO
Azamat Nurykau (BLR)
Maximilian Ausserleitner (AUT)	WO
Borislav Novachkov (BUL)

Bronze medals
Nikos Arzoumanidis (GRE)	2
Zurabi Iakobishvili (GEO)	13
Maximilian Ausserleitner (AUT)	0
David Safaryan (ARM)	10

- Andriy Kviatkovskyi and Magomedmurad Gadzhiev originally qualified for the Olympics, but were later disqualified for doping, giving their spots to David Safaryan and Zurabi Iakobishvili respectively. Later that decision was reverted.

=== 74 kg ===
16 April

Round of 32
Martin Obst (GER)	9–0	Robert Ollé (SVK)

Round of 16
Jabrayil Hasanov (AZE)	10
Alexandru Burcă (MDA)	0
Rasul Tsikhayeu (BLR)	5
Krystian Brzozowski (POL)	5
Marius Atofani (ROU)	2^{R}
Amirkhan Visalimov (AUT)	8
Suren Khachatryan (ARM)	15
Carmelo Lumia (ITA)	2
Oleg Zakharevych (UKR)	0
Soner Demirtaş (TUR)	11
Taimuraz Friev (ESP)	13
Miroslav Kirov (BUL)	9
Jakob Makarashvili (GEO)	10
Alexandros Samanidis (GRE)	0
Zsombor Gulyás (HUN)	0
Martin Obst (GER)	10

Quarterfinals
Jabrayil Hasanov (AZE)	10
Krystian Brzozowski (POL)	0
Amirkhan Visalimov (AUT)	4
Suren Khachatryan (ARM)	8
Soner Demirtaş (TUR)	2
Taimuraz Friev (ESP)	4^{F}
Jakob Makarashvili (GEO)	7
Martin Obst (GER)	6

Semifinals
Jabrayil Hasanov (AZE)	10
Suren Khachatryan (ARM)	0
Taimuraz Friev (ESP)	8
Jakob Makarashvili (GEO)	12

Final
Jabrayil Hasanov (AZE)	11
Jakob Makarashvili (GEO)	0

Repechage round 2
Alexandru Burcă (MDA)	WO
Krystian Brzozowski (POL)
Alexandros Samanidis (GRE)	6
Martin Obst (GER)	4

Bronze medals
Alexandru Burcă (MDA)	4
Suren Khachatryan (ARM)	2
Alexandros Samanidis (GRE)	WO
Taimuraz Friev (ESP)

=== 86 kg ===
16 April

Round of 16
Denis Balaur (MDA)	0
Ibragim Aldatov (UKR)	6
Timofei Xenidis (GRE)	6
Ville Heino (FIN)	2
Amarhajy Mahamedau (BLR)	8
Armands Zvirbulis (LAT)	0
René Matejov (SVK)	0
István Veréb (HUN)	11
Aron Caneva (ITA)	8
Dominic Peter (AUT)	3
Radosław Marcinkiewicz (POL)	3
Musa Murtazaliev (ARM)	1
William Harth (GER)	2
Andrei Franț (ROU)	1

Quarterfinals
Stefan Reichmuth (SUI)	1
Ibragim Aldatov (UKR)	7
Timofei Xenidis (GRE)	6
Amarhajy Mahamedau (BLR)	12
István Veréb (HUN)	10
Aron Caneva (ITA)	0
Radosław Marcinkiewicz (POL)	6
William Harth (GER)	3

Semifinals
Ibragim Aldatov (UKR)	3
Amarhajy Mahamedau (BLR)	3
István Veréb (HUN)	8
Radosław Marcinkiewicz (POL)	3

Final
Amarhajy Mahamedau (BLR)
István Veréb (HUN)	WO

Repechage round 1
Armands Zvirbulis (LAT)	WO
Timofei Xenidis (GRE)
René Matejov (SVK)	WO
Aron Caneva (ITA)

Bronze medals
Armands Zvirbulis (LAT)	WO
Ibragim Aldatov (UKR)
René Matejov (SVK)	1
Radosław Marcinkiewicz (POL)	3

=== 97 kg ===
17 April

Round of 16
Ivan Yankouski (BLR)	3
Egzon Shala (ALB)	4^{F}
Erik Thiele (GER)	3
Attila Szmik (HUN)	1
Edgar Yenokyan (ARM)	4
Michael Manea (ROU)	4
Radosław Baran (POL)	4
Magomedgaji Nurov (MKD)	2
Imants Lagodskis (LAT)	0
Nicolae Ceban (MDA)	10
Micheil Tsikovani (GRE)	8
Philipp Hutter (SUI)	0

Quarterfinals
İbrahim Bölükbaşı (TUR)	6
Jozef Jaloviar (SVK)	0
Egzon Shala (ALB)	6^{F}
Erik Thiele (GER)	4
Michael Manea (ROU)	0
Radosław Baran (POL)	10
Nicolae Ceban (MDA)	11
Micheil Tsikovani (GRE)	0

Semifinals
İbrahim Bölükbaşı (TUR)	12
Egzon Shala (ALB)	4
Radosław Baran (POL)	5
Nicolae Ceban (MDA)	2

Final
İbrahim Bölükbaşı (TUR)	1
Radosław Baran (POL)	3

Repechage round 1
Magomedgaji Nurov (MKD)	5
Michael Manea (ROU)	1

Bronze medals
Jozef Jaloviar (SVK)	6
Egzon Shala (ALB)	3
Magomedgaji Nurov (MKD)	WO
Nicolae Ceban (MDA)

=== 125 kg ===
17 April

Round of 16
Dániel Ligeti (HUN)	12
Rareș Chintoan (ROU)	2
Robert Baran (POL)	12
Andrei Romanov (MDA)	2

Quarterfinals
Yusup Jalilau (BLR)	4^{F}
Ioannis Arzoumanidis (GRE)	1
Boban Danov (MKD)	1
Lyuben Iliev (BUL)	5
Alen Zaseyev (UKR)	1
Soslan Gaglojev (SVK)	1
Dániel Ligeti (HUN)	10
Robert Baran (POL)	3

Semifinals
Yusup Jalilau (BLR)	3
Lyuben Iliev (BUL)	0
Alen Zaseyev (UKR)	7
Dániel Ligeti (HUN)	3

Final
Yusup Jalilau (BLR)
Alen Zaseyev (UKR)	WO

Bronze medals
Ioannis Arzoumanidis (GRE)
Lyuben Iliev (BUL)	WO
Soslan Gaglojev (SVK)
Dániel Ligeti (HUN)	WO

- Alen Zaseyev and Yusup Jalilau originally qualified for the Olympics, but were later disqualified for doping, giving their spots to Dániel Ligeti and Lyuben Iliev respectively.

== Men's Greco-Roman ==
=== 59 kg ===
15 April

Round of 32
Roman Amoyan (ARM)	8–0 Fall	Virgil Munteanu (ROU)
Fatih Üçüncü (TUR)	6–1	Csongor Knipli (HUN)
Federico Manea (ITA)	2–11	Erik Weiß (GER)

Round of 16
Stig-André Berge (NOR)	8
Joaquín Martínez (ESP)	0
Revaz Lashkhi (GEO)	2
Dawid Ersetic (POL)	1
Tobias Fonnesbek (DEN)	4
Jani Haapamäki (FIN)	4
Kostyantyn Balitskyi (UKR)	0
Kristijan Fris (SRB)	5
Ivan Lončarić (CRO)	0
Donior Islamov (MDA)	10
Sanal Semenov (RUS)	8^{F}
Ardit Fazljija (SWE)	0
Aleksandar Kostadinov (BUL)	5
Roman Amoyan (ARM)	0
Fatih Üçüncü (TUR)	4
Erik Weiß (GER)	0

Quarterfinals
Stig-André Berge (NOR)	6
Revaz Lashkhi (GEO)	2
Jani Haapamäki (FIN)	0
Kristijan Fris (SRB)	9
Donior Islamov (MDA)	0
Sanal Semenov (RUS)	10
Aleksandar Kostadinov (BUL)	4
Fatih Üçüncü (TUR)	2

Semifinals
Stig-André Berge (NOR)	0
Kristijan Fris (SRB)	8
Sanal Semenov (RUS)	11
Aleksandar Kostadinov (BUL)	2

Final
Kristijan Fris (SRB)	0
Sanal Semenov (RUS)	8

Repechage round 2
Kostyantyn Balitskyi (UKR)
Jani Haapamäki (FIN)	WO
Ardit Fazljija (SWE)	WO
Donior Islamov (MDA)

Bronze medals
Jani Haapamäki (FIN)	0
Stig-André Berge (NOR)	2
Ardit Fazljija (SWE)	2
Aleksandar Kostadinov (BUL)	6

=== 66 kg ===
15 April

Round of 32
Kamran Mammadov (AZE)	0–6	Dominik Etlinger (CRO)
Volkan Çakıl (TUR)	0–8	Edgaras Venckaitis (LTU)
Benedikt Puffer (AUT)	3–0	Ņikita Masjuks (LAT)
Yaraslau Kardash (BLR)	2–1	Armen Vardanyan (UKR)

Round of 16
Konstantin Stas (BUL)	6
Danielo Di Feola (SWE)	5
Shmagi Bolkvadze (GEO)	6
Marius Thommesen (NOR)	0
Anders Ekstrøm (DEN)	4
Tomi Hinoveanu (ROU)	4
Dawid Kareciński (POL)	8
Davide Cascavilla (ITA)	0
Hugo Passos (POR)	0
Artak Margaryan (FRA)	8
Matias Lipasti (FIN)	0
Tamás Lőrincz (HUN)	9
Dominik Etlinger (CRO)	8
Edgaras Venckaitis (LTU)	0
Benedikt Puffer (AUT)	1
Yaraslau Kardash (BLR)	7

Quarterfinals
Konstantin Stas (BUL)	0
Shmagi Bolkvadze (GEO)	9
Tomi Hinoveanu (ROU)	0
Dawid Kareciński (POL)	2
Artak Margaryan (FRA)	0
Tamás Lőrincz (HUN)	4
Dominik Etlinger (CRO)	3
Yaraslau Kardash (BLR)	2

Semifinals
Shmagi Bolkvadze (GEO)	5
Dawid Kareciński (POL)	0
Tamás Lőrincz (HUN)	6
Dominik Etlinger (CRO)	2

Final
Shmagi Bolkvadze (GEO)	1
Tamás Lőrincz (HUN)	4

Repechage round 2
Marius Thommesen (NOR)	4
Konstantin Stas (BUL)	0
Matias Lipasti (FIN)	3
Artak Margaryan (FRA)	8

Bronze medals
Marius Thommesen (NOR)	7
Dawid Kareciński (POL)	1
Artak Margaryan (FRA)	WO
Dominik Etlinger (CRO)

=== 75 kg ===
16 April

Round of 32
Vojtech Jakus (SVK)	0–5	Florian Neumaier (GER)
Mykola Daragan (UKR)	5–4	Arkadiusz Kułynycz (POL)
László Szabó (HUN)	5–4	Jim Pettersson (SWE)
Božo Starčević (CRO)	2–3	Viktor Nemeš (SRB)

Round of 16
Florian Marchl (AUT)	0
Emrah Kuş (TUR)	7
Zurabi Datunashvili (GEO)	3
Ilian Georgiev (BUL)	2
Petros Manouilidis (GRE)	0
Karapet Chalyan (ARM)	9
Ciro Russo (ITA)	0
Valery Palenski (BLR)	4
Igor Beşleaga (MDA)	2
Rafael Samurgashev (MNE)	0
Ilie Cojocari (ROU)	3
Jonas Bossert (SUI)	2
Florian Neumaier (GER)	4
Mykola Daragan (UKR)	5
László Szabó (HUN)	0
Viktor Nemeš (SRB)	4^{F}

Quarterfinals
Emrah Kuş (TUR)	2
Zurabi Datunashvili (GEO)	3
Karapet Chalyan (ARM)	7
Valery Palenski (BLR)	0
Igor Beşleaga (MDA)	4
Ilie Cojocari (ROU)	0
Mykola Daragan (UKR)	0
Viktor Nemeš (SRB)	12

Semifinals
Zurabi Datunashvili (GEO)	2
Karapet Chalyan (ARM)	1
Igor Beşleaga (MDA)	0
Viktor Nemeš (SRB)	3

Final
Zurabi Datunashvili (GEO)
Viktor Nemeš (SRB)	WO

Repechage round 1
Božo Starčević (CRO)	5
László Szabó (HUN)	0

Repechage round 2
Ilian Georgiev (BUL)
Emrah Kuş (TUR)	WO
Božo Starčević (CRO)	9
Mykola Daragan (UKR)	8

Bronze medals
Emrah Kuş (TUR)	0
Karapet Chalyan (ARM)	3
Božo Starčević (CRO)	9
Igor Beşleaga (MDA)	4

=== 85 kg ===
16 April

Round of 32
Laimutis Adomaitis (LTU)	0–2	Mélonin Noumonvi (FRA)
Nenad Žugaj (CRO)	3–0	Alo Toom (EST)
Pedro García (ESP)	4–0 Fall	Ilias Boukis (GRE)
Metehan Başar (TUR)	0–1	Aleksey Mishin (RUS)

Round of 16
Nikolay Bayryakov (BUL)	3
Attila Tamaș (ROU)	2
Maksim Manukyan (ARM)	14
Fabio Parisi (ITA)	3
Roberti Kobliashvili (GEO)	1
Artur Omarov (CZE)	6
Zakarias Berg (SWE)	8
Damian Janikowski (POL)	0
Denis Kudla (GER)	6
Nikolaj Dobrev (SRB)	0
Amer Hrustanović (AUT)	6
Aliaksandr Kikiniou (BLR)	2
Mélonin Noumonvi (FRA)	1
Nenad Žugaj (CRO)	0
Pedro García (ESP)	1
Aleksey Mishin (RUS)	5

Quarterfinals
Nikolay Bayryakov (BUL)	3
Maksim Manukyan (ARM)	2
Artur Omarov (CZE)	5
Zakarias Berg (SWE)	3
Denis Kudla (GER)	2
Amer Hrustanović (AUT)	0
Mélonin Noumonvi (FRA)	0
Aleksey Mishin (RUS)	2

Semifinals
Nikolay Bayryakov (BUL)	4^{F}
Artur Omarov (CZE)	2
Denis Kudla (GER)	0
Aleksey Mishin (RUS)	3

Final
Nikolay Bayryakov (BUL)	1
Aleksey Mishin (RUS)	3

Repechage round 1
Metehan Başar (TUR)	WO
Pedro García (ESP)

Repechage round 2
Attila Tamaș (ROU)	WO
Maksim Manukyan (ARM)
Metehan Başar (TUR)	WO
Mélonin Noumonvi (FRA)

Bronze medals
Attila Tamaș (ROU)
Artur Omarov (CZE)	WO
Metehan Başar (TUR)	WO
Denis Kudla (GER)

=== 98 kg ===
17 April

Round of 16
David Vála (CZE)	2
Ádám Varga (HUN)	5
Radosław Grzybicki (POL)	1
Daigoro Timoncini (ITA)	1
Peter Öhler (GER)	9
Cenk İldem (TUR)	1
Tuomas Lahti (FIN)	6
Daniel Gastl (AUT)	3
Shalva Gadabadze (AZE)	2
Ardo Arusaar (EST)	3
Tsimafei Dzeinichenka (BLR)	8
Vasil Imerlishvili (GEO)	0
Vilius Laurinaitis (LTU)	3
Felix Baldauf (NOR)	6

Quarterfinals
Georgios Koutsioumpas (GRE)	0
Ádám Varga (HUN)	2
Daigoro Timoncini (ITA)	1
Peter Öhler (GER)	4
Tuomas Lahti (FIN)	2
Ardo Arusaar (EST)	6
Tsimafei Dzeinichenka (BLR)	2
Felix Baldauf (NOR)	1

Semifinals
Ádám Varga (HUN)	1
Peter Öhler (GER)	0
Ardo Arusaar (EST)	1
Tsimafei Dzeinichenka (BLR)	1

Final
Ádám Varga (HUN)	1
Ardo Arusaar (EST)	3

Repechage round 1
David Vála (CZE)	WO
Georgios Koutsioumpas (GRE)
Shalva Gadabadze (AZE)	6
Tuomas Lahti (FIN)	1

Bronze medals
David Vála (CZE)	WO
Peter Öhler (GER)
Shalva Gadabadze (AZE)	1
Tsimafei Dzeinichenka (BLR)	1

=== 130 kg ===
17 April

Round of 16
Tamás Soós (SVK)	0
Eduard Popp (GER)	8
Mindaugas Mizgaitis (LTU)	5
Stjepan Lavrić (CRO)	2
Ioseb Chugoshvili (BLR)	8
Lyubomir Dimitrov (BUL)	0
Jalmar Sjöberg (SWE)	6
Lukas Hörmann (AUT)	0
Nemanja Pavlović (SRB)	1
Heiki Nabi (EST)	4
Edgar Khachatryan (ARM)	0
Bálint Lám (HUN)	5

Quarterfinals
Xenofon Koutsioumpas (GRE)	2
Sandro Dikhaminjia (GEO)	3
Eduard Popp (GER)	4
Mindaugas Mizgaitis (LTU)	0
Ioseb Chugoshvili (BLR)	8
Jalmar Sjöberg (SWE)	0
Heiki Nabi (EST)	3
Bálint Lám (HUN)	0

Semifinals
Sandro Dikhaminjia (GEO)	0
Eduard Popp (GER)	2
Ioseb Chugoshvili (BLR)	1
Heiki Nabi (EST)	3

Final
Eduard Popp (GER)	0
Heiki Nabi (EST)	3

Repechage round 1
Tamás Soós (SVK)	WO
Mindaugas Mizgaitis (LTU)
Nemanja Pavlović (SRB)	WO
Bálint Lám (HUN)

Bronze medals
Tamás Soós (SVK)	0
Sandro Dikhaminjia (GEO)	4^{F}
Nemanja Pavlović (SRB)	WO
Ioseb Chugoshvili (BLR)

== Women's freestyle ==
=== 48 kg ===
15 April

Round of 16
Silvia Felice (ITA)	6
Maryna Markevich (BLR)	9
Liliana Santos (POR)	0
Evin Demirhan (TUR)	2^{F}
Elitsa Yankova (BUL)	14
Yana Rattigan (GBR)	2

Quarterfinals
Iwona Matkowska (POL)	5
Nataliya Pulkovska (UKR)	5
Alina Vuc (ROU)	11
Jaqueline Schellin (GER)	1
Eugenia Bustabad (ESP)	1
Maryna Markevich (BLR)	2
Evin Demirhan (TUR)	2
Elitsa Yankova (BUL)	8

Semifinals
Nataliya Pulkovska (UKR)	5
Alina Vuc (ROU)	6
Maryna Markevich (BLR)	2
Elitsa Yankova (BUL)	6

Final
Alina Vuc (ROU)	2
Elitsa Yankova (BUL)	3

Repechage round 1
Yana Rattigan (GBR)	0
Evin Demirhan (TUR)	10

Bronze medals
Jaqueline Schellin (GER)	0
Nataliya Pulkovska (UKR)	3
Evin Demirhan (TUR)	2
Maryna Markevich (BLR)	1

=== 53 kg ===
15 April

Round of 16
Katarzyna Krawczyk (POL)	10
Bilyana Dudova (BUL)	0
Irina Ologonova (RUS)	6
Bediha Gün (TUR)	0
Yuliya Khavaldzhy (UKR)	10^{F}
Mercédesz Dénes (HUN)	0
Natalia Budu (MDA)	0
Estera Dobre (ROU)	2
Lenka Hocková (CZE)	0
Maria Prevolaraki (GRE)	11
Vanesa Kaladzinskaya (BLR)	2
Nina Hemmer (GER)	2^{F}

Quarterfinals
Francesca Mori (ITA)	9
Vânia Guerreiro (POR)	3
Katarzyna Krawczyk (POL)	10
Irina Ologonova (RUS)	7
Yuliya Khavaldzhy (UKR)	12
Estera Dobre (ROU)	6
Maria Prevolaraki (GRE)	1
Nina Hemmer (GER)	1

Semifinals
Francesca Mori (ITA)	1
Katarzyna Krawczyk (POL)	11
Yuliya Khavaldzhy (UKR)	8
Nina Hemmer (GER)	10

Final
Katarzyna Krawczyk (POL)	10
Nina Hemmer (GER)	0

Repechage round 1
Bilyana Dudova (BUL)	3
Irina Ologonova (RUS)	4
Vanesa Kaladzinskaya (BLR)	WO
Maria Prevolaraki (GRE)

Bronze medals
Irina Ologonova (RUS)	8
Francesca Mori (ITA)	2
Vanesa Kaladzinskaya (BLR)
Yuliya Khavaldzhy (UKR)	WO

=== 58 kg ===
16 April

Round of 16
Emese Barka (HUN)	3^{F}
Carola Rainero (ITA)	0
Oksana Herhel (UKR)	2^{F}
Agnieszka Król (POL)	0

Quarterfinals
Grace Bullen (NOR)	2
Mimi Hristova (BUL)	4
Karima Sánchez (ESP)	0
Luisa Niemesch (GER)	6^{F}
Anastasiya Huchok (BLR)	0
Mariana Cherdivara (MDA)	7
Emese Barka (HUN)	6
Oksana Herhel (UKR)	6^{F}

Semifinals
Mimi Hristova (BUL)	4^{F}
Luisa Niemesch (GER)	0
Mariana Cherdivara (MDA)	2
Oksana Herhel (UKR)	6^{F}

Final
Mimi Hristova (BUL)	5^{F}
Oksana Herhel (UKR)	2

Repechage round 1
Agnieszka Król (POL)	0
Emese Barka (HUN)	11

Bronze medals
Grace Bullen (NOR)	4
Luisa Niemesch (GER)	2
Emese Barka (HUN)	2
Mariana Cherdivara (MDA)	3

- Oksana Herhel originally qualified for the Olympics, but was later disqualified for doping, giving the spot to Mariana Cherdivara. Later that decision was reverted.

=== 63 kg ===
16 April

Quarterfinals		Semifinals		Final
Adéla Hanzlíčková (CZE)	4
Irina Netreba (AZE)	10	Irina Netreba (AZE)	2
Anastasia Bratchikova (RUS)	10	Anastasia Bratchikova (RUS)	7
Agoro Papavasileiou (GRE)	0			Anastasia Bratchikova (RUS)	2
Hafize Şahin (TUR)	0			Maryia Mamashuk (BLR)	4
Maryia Mamashuk (BLR)	11	Maryia Mamashuk (BLR)	4
Marianna Sastin (HUN)	2	Marianna Sastin (HUN)	2
Monika Michalik (POL)	1

Bronze medals
Agoro Papavasileiou (GRE)	9
Irina Netreba (AZE)	9
Hafize Şahin (TUR)	4
Marianna Sastin (HUN)	8

=== 69 kg ===
17 April

Round of 16
Elis Manolova (AZE)	0
Agnieszka Wieszczek (POL)	5
Maria Vryoni (GRE)	0
Alina Stadnyk (UKR)	10
Ilana Kratysh (ISR)	4
Martina Kuenz (AUT)	7^{F}

Quarterfinals
Laura Skujiņa (LAT)	7
Danutė Domikaitytė (LTU)	0
Vanessa Wilson (HUN)	0
Buse Tosun (TUR)	13
Adina Popescu (ROU)	0
Agnieszka Wieszczek (POL)	4
Alina Stadnyk (UKR)	6^{F}
Martina Kuenz (AUT)	6

Semifinals
Laura Skujiņa (LAT)	1
Buse Tosun (TUR)	13
Agnieszka Wieszczek (POL)	4
Alina Stadnyk (UKR)	2

Final
Buse Tosun (TUR)	5
Agnieszka Wieszczek (POL)	9

Repechage round 1
Elis Manolova (AZE)	3
Adina Popescu (ROU)	0

Bronze medals
Vanessa Wilson (HUN)	2
Laura Skujiņa (LAT)	7
Elis Manolova (AZE)	0
Alina Stadnyk (UKR)	5

=== 75 kg ===
17 April

Round of 16
Alla Cherkasova (UKR)	7
Svetlana Saenko (MDA)	3
Alena Starodubtseva (RUS)	2
Fanny Gradin (SWE)	2

Quarterfinals
Cynthia Vescan (FRA)	6^{F}
Daria Osocka (POL)	0
Yasemin Adar (TUR)	10
Maider Unda (ESP)	0
Maria Selmaier (GER)	3
Zsanett Németh (HUN)	1
Alla Cherkasova (UKR)	8
Fanny Gradin (SWE)	0

Semifinals
Cynthia Vescan (FRA)	3
Yasemin Adar (TUR)	7
Maria Selmaier (GER)	6
Alla Cherkasova (UKR)	10

Final
Yasemin Adar (TUR)	WO
Alla Cherkasova (UKR)

Repechage round 1
Svetlana Saenko (MDA)	4
Fanny Gradin (SWE)	11

Bronze medals
Maider Unda (ESP)	1
Cynthia Vescan (FRA)	3
Fanny Gradin (SWE)	2
Maria Selmaier (GER)	9
