= 2020 Poland Open =

Amateur wrestling in Poland

2020 Ziolkowski, Pytlasinski, Poland Open
- Host city: Warsaw, Poland
- Dates: 2–8 November
- Stadium: Arena Ursynow

Champions
- Freestyle: Turkey
- Greco-Roman: Poland
- Women: Russia

The 2020 Ziolkowski, Pytlasinski, Poland Open, was an amateur wrestling event held in Warsaw, Poland between 2 and 8 November 2020. The event consisted of three competitions: the Waclaw Ziolkowski Memorial (men's freestyle wrestling), Wladyslaw Pytlasinski Cup (men's Greco-Roman wrestling) and Poland Open (women's wrestling).

== Event videos ==
The event was aired freely on the SportZona YouTube channel.

Broadcast
4 November 2020-Qualification Mat 1	4 November 2020-Qualification Mat 2	4 November 2020-Finals Mat 1	4 November 2020-Finals Mat 2
5 November 2020-Qualification Mat 1	5 November 2020-Qualification Mat 2	5 November 2020-Finals Mat 1	5 November 2020-Finals Mat 2
6 November 2020-Qualification Mat 1	6 November 2020-Qualification Mat 2	6 November 2020-Finals Mat 1	6 November 2020-Finals Mat 2
7 November 2020-Qualification Mat 1	7 November 2020-Qualification Mat 2	7 November 2020-Finals Mat 1	7 November 2020-Finals Mat 2
8 November 2020-Qualification Mat 1	8 November 2020-Qualification Mat 2	8 November 2020-Finals Mat 1	8 November 2020-Finals Mat 2

== Medal table ==
Rank	Nation	Gold	Silver	Bronze	Total
1	Turkey	10	6	18	34
2	Poland	6	7	14	27
3	Russia	6	5	4	15
4	France	3	2	3	8
5	Kyrgyzstan	2	0	0	2
6	Moldova	1	2	7	10
7	Romania	1	1	1	3
8	Netherlands	1	1	0	2
9	Estonia	0	2	2	4
10	Hungary	0	2	1	3
11	Sweden	0	1	1	2
12	Latvia	0	1	0	1
13	Greece	0	0	3	3
Totals (13 entries)		30	30	54	114

=== Team ranking ===
Rank	Men's freestyle		Men's Greco-Roman		Women's freestyle	
Rank	Team	Points	Team	Points	Team	Points
1	Turkey	299	Poland	341	Russia	318
2	Poland	177	Turkey	320	Poland	285
3	Moldova	134	France	82	Turkey	131
4	France	96	Estonia	65	Kyrgyzstan	54
5	Romania	74	Netherlands	45	Moldova	50

== Medal overview ==
=== Men's freestyle (Waclaw Ziolkowski Memorial) ===
Event	Gold	Silver	Bronze
57 kg	Razvan Kovacs; Romania	Petru Craciun; Moldova	Ali Karaboğa; Turkey
61 kg	Ahmet Duman; Turkey	Recep Topal; Turkey	Ivan Guidea; Romania
61 kg	Ahmet Duman; Turkey	Recep Topal; Turkey	Georgios Pilidis; Greece
65 kg	Krzysztof Bienkowski; Poland	Ilman Mukhtarov; France	Selahattin Kılıçsallayan; Turkey
65 kg	Krzysztof Bienkowski; Poland	Ilman Mukhtarov; France	Nicolai Grahmez; Moldova
70 kg	Magomedmurad Gadzhiev; Poland	Haydar Yavuz; Turkey	Servet Coşkun; Turkey
70 kg	Magomedmurad Gadzhiev; Poland	Haydar Yavuz; Turkey	Mihail Sava; Moldova
74 kg	Fazlı Eryılmaz; Turkey	Maxim Vasilioglo; Romania	Andrzej Sokalski; Poland
74 kg	Fazlı Eryılmaz; Turkey	Maxim Vasilioglo; Romania	Charles Afa; France
79 kg	Saifedine Alekma; France	Alans Amirovs; Latvia	Muhammet Nuri Kotanoğlu; Turkey
79 kg	Saifedine Alekma; France	Alans Amirovs; Latvia	Ramazan Sarı; Turkey
86 kg	Piotr Ianulov; Moldova	Zbigniew Baranowski; Poland	Selim Yaşar; Turkey
86 kg	Piotr Ianulov; Moldova	Zbigniew Baranowski; Poland	Fatih Erdin; Turkey
92 kg	Erhan Yaylacı; Turkey	Arif Özen; Turkey	Georgii Rubaev; Moldova
92 kg	Erhan Yaylacı; Turkey	Arif Özen; Turkey	Michal Bielawski; Poland
97 kg	Süleyman Karadeniz; Turkey	Radosław Baran; Poland	Sven Engstrom; Sweden
97 kg	Süleyman Karadeniz; Turkey	Radosław Baran; Poland	Radu Lefter; Moldova
125 kg	Robert Baran; Poland	Daniel Ligeti; Hungary	Samhan Jabrailov; Moldova

=== Men's Greco-Roman (Wladyslaw Pytlasinski Cup) ===
Event	Gold	Silver	Bronze
55 kg	(Turkey) Ali Elçin	(Poland) Mairbek Salimov	
60 kg	(Poland) Dawid Andrzej Ersetic	(Poland) Grzegorz Kunkel	(Estonia) Helary Mägisalu
60 kg	(Poland) Dawid Andrzej Ersetic	(Poland) Grzegorz Kunkel	(Turkey) Ahmet Uyar
63 kg	(Turkey) Abdurahman Altan	(Turkey) Mehmet Çeker	(Turkey) Fatih Üçüncü
63 kg	(Turkey) Abdurahman Altan	(Turkey) Mehmet Çeker	(Poland) Mateusz Szewczuk
67 kg	(Poland) Gevorg Sahakyan	(Turkey) Enes Başar	(Turkey) Hacı Karakuş
67 kg	(Poland) Gevorg Sahakyan	(Turkey) Enes Başar	(Poland) Mateusz Bernatek
72 kg	(Turkey) Cengiz Arslan	(France) Mahmoud Ghanem	(Turkey) Ahmet Yılmaz
77 kg	(Poland) Edgar Babayan	(Netherlands) Marcel Sterkenburg	(Poland) Iwan Nylypiuk
77 kg	(Poland) Edgar Babayan	(Netherlands) Marcel Sterkenburg	(Poland) Patryk Bednarz
82 kg	(Netherlands) Tyrone Sterkenburg	(Estonia) Ranet Kaljola	(France) Joseph Dacher
87 kg	(Turkey) Doğan Göktaş	(Poland) Szymon Szymonowicz	(Turkey) Ali Cengiz
87 kg	(Turkey) Doğan Göktaş	(Poland) Szymon Szymonowicz	(Poland) Kacper Kaźmierczak
97 kg	(France) Mélonin Noumonvi	(Turkey) Süleyman Demirci	(Turkey) Doğan Yılmaz
97 kg	(France) Mélonin Noumonvi	(Turkey) Süleyman Demirci	(Greece) Laokratis Kessidis
130 kg	(Turkey) Hamza Bakır	(Estonia) Heiki Nabi	(Turkey) Osman Yıldırım
130 kg	(Turkey) Hamza Bakır	(Estonia) Heiki Nabi	(Poland) Rafał Płowiec

=== Women's freestyle (Poland Open) ===
Event	Gold	Silver	Bronze
50 kg	Ekaterina Poleshchuk; Russia	Maria Tyumerekova; Russia	Nadezhda Sokolova; Russia
50 kg	Ekaterina Poleshchuk; Russia	Maria Tyumerekova; Russia	Evin Demirhan; Turkey
53 kg	Angela Vetoshkina; Russia	Katarzyna Krawczyk; Poland	Roksana Zasina; Poland
53 kg	Angela Vetoshkina; Russia	Katarzyna Krawczyk; Poland	Maria Prevolaraki; Greece
55 kg	Olga Khoroshavtseva; Russia	Marina Simonyan; Russia	Mehlika Öztürk; Turkey
55 kg	Olga Khoroshavtseva; Russia	Marina Simonyan; Russia	Angelika Mytkowska; Poland
57 kg	Veronika Chumikova; Russia	Barka Emese; Hungary	Jowita Wrzesień; Poland
57 kg	Veronika Chumikova; Russia	Barka Emese; Hungary	Anastasia Nichita; Moldova
59 kg	Svetlana Lipatova; Russia	Johanna Lindborg; Sweden	Anastasia Lakovleva; Russia
59 kg	Svetlana Lipatova; Russia	Johanna Lindborg; Sweden	Mariana Cherdivara; Moldova
62 kg	Aisuluu Tynybekova; Kyrgyzstan	Anzhela Fomenko; Russia	Cansu Aksoy; Turkey
62 kg	Aisuluu Tynybekova; Kyrgyzstan	Anzhela Fomenko; Russia	Anna Szel; Hungary
65 kg	Maria Kuznetsova; Russia	Irina Rîngaci; Moldova	Zuzanna Wólczyńska; Poland
65 kg	Maria Kuznetsova; Russia	Irina Rîngaci; Moldova	Aslı Demir; Turkey
68 kg	Meerim Zhumanazarova; Kyrgyzstan	Agnieszka Wieszczek-Kordus; Poland	Velleva Khanum; Russia
68 kg	Meerim Zhumanazarova; Kyrgyzstan	Agnieszka Wieszczek-Kordus; Poland	Natalia Strzalka; Poland
72 kg	Koumba Larroque; France	Marina Surovtseva; Russia	Evgeniia Zakharchenko; Russia
72 kg	Koumba Larroque; France	Marina Surovtseva; Russia	Anna Urbanowicz; Poland
76 kg	Yasemin Adar; Turkey	Ekaterina Bukina; Russia	Epp Mäe; Estonia
76 kg	Yasemin Adar; Turkey	Ekaterina Bukina; Russia	Pauline Lecarpentier; France

== Participating nations ==
205 competitors from 17 nations participated.

- Poland (69)
- Turkey (47)
- Estonia (5)
- Netherlands (2)
- France (21)
- Greece (4)
- Russia (16)
- Kyrgyzstan (4)
- Hungary (4)
- Sweden (4)
- Tunisia (1)
- United Kingdom (2)
- Spain (7)
- Latvia (1)
- Ukraine (1)
- Moldova (12)
- Romania (5)
