= Bedopassa Buassat =

Bissau-Guinean sport wrestler

Personal information
- Born: 20 September 1992 (age 33)

Sport
- Sport: Freestyle wrestling

Bedopassa Buassat Djonde (born 20 September 1992) is a Bissau-Guinean freestyle wrestler. He competed in the men's freestyle 97 kg event at the 2016 Summer Olympics, in which he was eliminated in the round of 32 by Magomed Ibragimov.

In 2021, he competed at the 2021 African & Oceania Wrestling Olympic Qualification Tournament hoping to qualify for the 2020 Summer Olympics in Tokyo, Japan.
