= Magomed Ibragimov (wrestler, born 1985) =

Uzbekistani wrestler

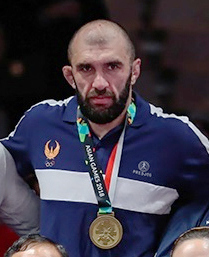
- Ibragimov at the 2018 Asian Games

Personal information
- Native name: Магомед Ибрагимов
- Full name: Magomed Idrisovitch Ibragimov
- Nationality: (Russia) Russian (Uzbekistan) Uzbekistani
- Born: 2 June 1985 (age 41) Irib, Dagestan ASSR, Soviet Union
- Height: 1.90 m (6 ft 3 in)
- Weight: 97 kg (214 lb)

Sport
- Country: Uzbekistan
- Sport: Wrestling
- Event: Freestyle
- Coached by: Alim Khikmatov; Akhroljan Ruziev; Mairbek Yusupov; Kasum Nasrudinov
Medal record
Men's freestyle wrestling
Representing Uzbekistan
Olympic Games
Bronze medal – third place	2016 Rio de Janeiro	97 kg
Asian Games
Bronze medal – third place	2018 Jakarta	97 kg
Asian Championships
Gold medal – first place	2018 Bishkek	97 kg
Gold medal – first place	2017 New Delhi	97 kg
Islamic Solidarity Games
Bronze medal – third place	2021 Konya	97 kg
Bolat Turlykhanov Cup
Bronze medal – third place	2022 Almaty	97 kg
Representing Russia
Alexander Medved International
Gold medal – first place	2010 Minsk	96 kg
Ali Aliyev memorial
Silver medal – second place	2010 Kaspiysk	96 kg
Silver medal – second place	2011 Kaspiysk	96 kg
Gold medal – first place	2021 Kaspiysk	97kg

Magomed Idrisovich Ibragimov (Russian: Магомед Идрисович Ибрагимов; born 2 June 1985) is a Russian-born naturalized Uzbekistani former wrestler of Avar descent, who competes in the heavyweight freestyle division. He is the 2016 Olympic and 2018 Asian Games bronze medalist.

Ibragimov took up wrestling at age 12 in Makhachkala, Russia, and studied at the Dagestan State Pedagogical University there.

Ibragimov initially represented Russia, but in 2016 received Uzbekistani citizenship. He was selected for the 2016 Olympics in May 2016 by winning the second place at the qualification tournament in Ulaanbaatar. He won bronze medal at the 2016 Olympics, with victories over the two-time World champion Reza Yazdani (fall), 2012 Olympic medalist Valeriy Andriytsev (6-4) in the repechage rounds.
