= Pavlo Oliynyk =

Ukrainian freestyle wrestler (born 1989)

Pavlo Oliinyk
Personal information
- Full name: Pavlo Oliinyk
- Nationality: Ukraine
- Born: February 21, 1989 (age 37) Khmelnytskyi, Ukraine
- Weight: 96 kg (212 lb)

Sport
- Sport: Wrestling
- Event: Freestyle
Medal record
Men's freestyle wrestling
Representing Ukraine
World Championships
Bronze medal – third place	2013 Budapest	96 kg
Bronze medal – third place	2015 Las Vegas	97 kg
European Championships
Bronze medal – third place	2011 Dortmund	96 kg
Gold medal – first place	2013 Tbilisi	96 kg
Summer Universiade
Silver medal – second place	2013 Kazan	96 kg
Military Games
Bronze medal – third place	2015 Mungyeong	97 kg

Pavlo Oliinyk (born 1989) is a Ukrainian freestyle wrestler currently representing Hungary, who won the gold medal at the 2013 European Wrestling Championships defeating Kamil Skaskiewicz of Poland 1–0, 4–0.
