= Abdusalam Gadisov =

Russian freestyle wrestler

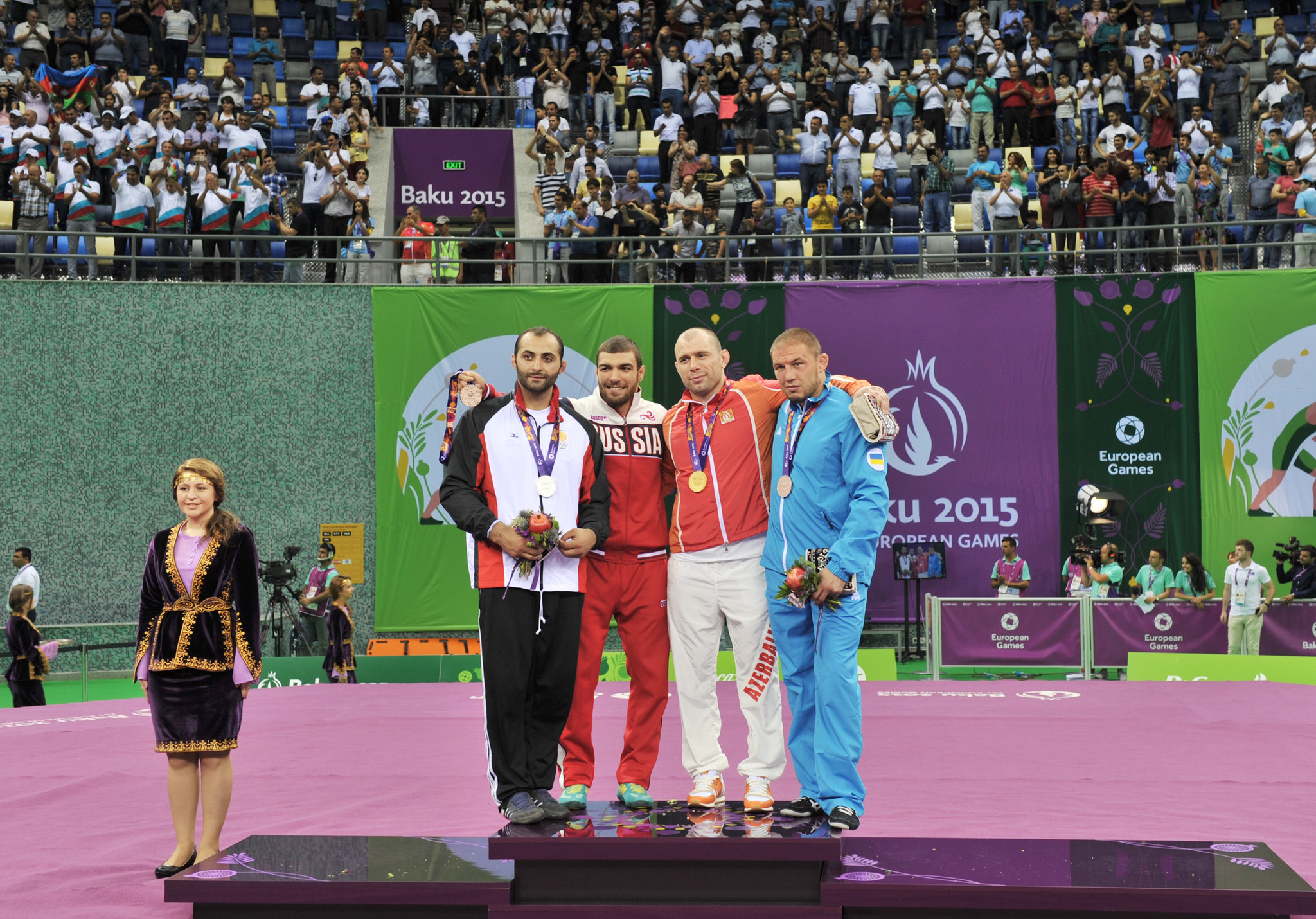
- gold medal to the freestyle wrestler Khetag Gazyumov, Wrestling at the 2015 European Games

Personal information
- Nickname: Mr Olympia
- Born: Abdusalam Mamatkhanovich Gadisov; 26 March 1989 (age 37) Makhachkala, Dagestan ASSR, Russian SFSR, Soviet Union
- Height: 1.81 m (5 ft 11 in)
- Weight: Light Heavyweight (97 kg); Middleweight (formally, 86 kg)

Sport
- Rank: Grand Master of Sports in Freestyle Wrestling
- Club: Dynamo wrestling club Armor Functional Training Center
- Coached by: Magomed Magomedov, Gaidar Gaidarov, Imanmurza Aliev
Medal record
Men's Freestyle wrestling
Representing Russia
World Championships
Gold medal – first place	2014 Tashkent	97 kg
Disqualified	2015 Las Vegas	97 kg
European Games
Disqualified	2015 Baku	97 kg
Summer Universiade
Gold medal – first place	2013 Kazan	96 kg
European Championships
Gold medal – first place	2012 Belgrade	96 kg
Gold medal – first place	2014 Vantaa	97 kg

Abdusalam Mamatkhanovich Gadisov (born 26 March 1989) is a Russian former freestyle wrestler. He competed in the freestyle 96 kg event at the 2012 Summer Olympics; after defeating Taimuraz Tigiyev in the qualification round, he was eliminated by Reza Yazdani in the 1/8 finals.

In 2014 he became World freestyle wrestling champion at the 97 kg division, and was the runner-up in 2015.

At the national level, he became Russian national champion in 2012. In the final he defeated Olympic Champion and five time World Champion Khadzhimurat Gatsalov. He won the Russian National Freestyle Wrestling Championships again in 2015.

He is a devout Sunni Muslim.
