= Dorjkhandyn Khüderbulga =

Mongolian freestyle wrestler

Personal information
- Native name: Доржханд Хүдэрбулга
- Nationality: Mongolia
- Born: 7 May 1992 (age 34) Tuv, Mongolia
- Height: 187 cm (6 ft 2 in)

Sport
- Country: Mongolia
- Sport: Wrestling
- Weight class: 125 kg
- Event: Freestyle
- Club: Khuch sport club
- Coached by: Dandar

Achievements and titles
- Olympic finals: 16th(2016)
- World finals: 7th(2014)
- Regional finals: (gold) (2014)
Medal record
Men's freestyle wrestling
Representing Mongolia
Asian Games
| Bronze medal – third place | 2014 Incheon | 97 kg |
Asian Championships
| Gold medal – first place | 2014 Astana | 97 kg |
| Silver medal – second place | 2020 New Delhi | 125 kg |
| Bronze medal – third place | 2012 Gumi | 96 kg |
| Bronze medal – third place | 2013 Delhi | 96 kg |
| Bronze medal – third place | 2016 Bangkok | 97 kg |
| Bronze medal – third place | 2021 Almaty | 125 kg |
Military World Games
| Silver medal – second place | 2015 Mungyeong | 97 kg |
Summer Universiade
| Bronze medal – third place | 2013 Kazan | 96 kg |
Olympic Qualification Tournament
| Silver medal – second place | 2016 Istanbul | 97 kg |
| Bronze medal – third place | 2016 Ulaanbaatar | 97 kg |
| Bronze medal – third place | 2016 Astana | 97 kg |
Yasar Dogu Tournament
| Silver medal – second place | 2016 Istanbul | 97 kg |
- Updated on 5 July 2021

Dorjkhandyn Khüderbulga is a Mongolian freestyle wrestler.

== 2012 season ==
Khüderbulga took bronze at the 2012 Asian Wrestling Championships.

== 2013 season ==
He took bronze at the 2013 Asian Wrestling Championships and the 2013 Summer Universiade. He also competed at the 2013 World Wrestling Championships, losing in the first round.

== 2014 season ==
Khüderbulga won the 2014 Asian Wrestling Championships and took bronze at the 2014 Asian Games. He was also made it to the quarterfinals at the 2014 World Wrestling Championships.

== 2015 season ==
He lost in the first round at the 2015 World Wrestling Championships.

== 2016 season ==
Khüderbulga qualified for the 2016 Olympics by making the finals at the 2016 World Wrestling Olympic Qualification Tournament 2 after losing the Olympic wrestle-off at the 2016 World Wrestling Olympic Qualification Tournament 1.
