= Khetag Gazyumov =

Azerbaijani wrestler

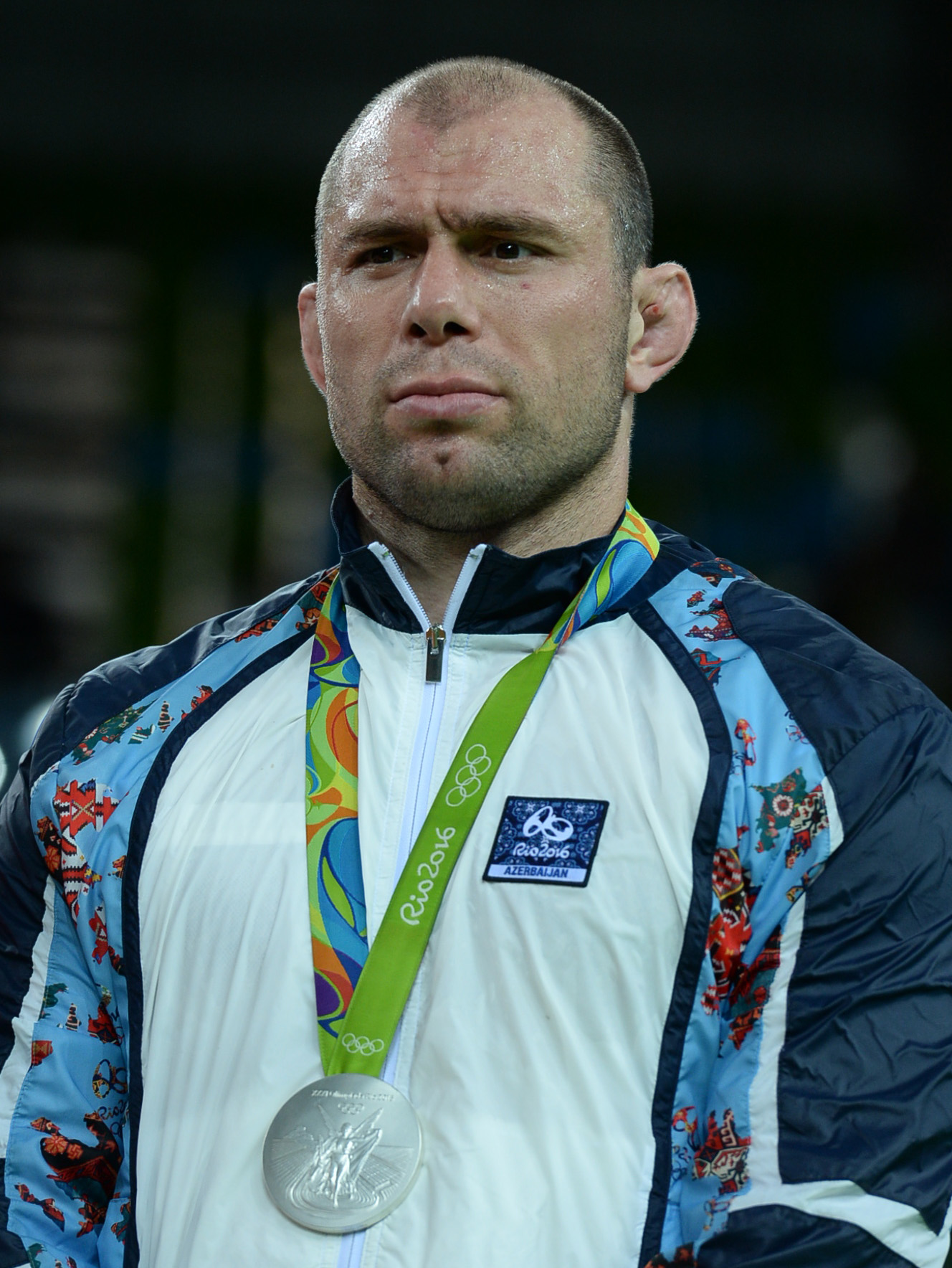
- Gazyumov at the 2016 Olympics

Personal information
- Nickname: Mustang
- Born: 24 April 1981 (age 45) Suadag, North Ossetian ASSR, Russian SFSR, Soviet Union
- Education: Gorsky State Agrarian University
- Height: 180 cm (5 ft 11 in) (2016)
- Weight: 97 kg (214 lb) (2016)

Sport
- Sport: Wrestling
- Weight class: 96–97 kg
- Event: Freestyle
- Club: Atasport
- Coached by: Firdovsi Umudov; Marik Tedeyev; Magomed Aliomarov
Medal record
Men's freestyle wrestling
Representing Azerbaijan
Olympic Games
Silver medal – second place	2016 Rio de Janeiro	97 kg
Bronze medal – third place	2008 Beijing	96 kg
Bronze medal – third place	2012 London	96 kg
World Championships
Gold medal – first place	Moscow 2010	96 kg
Silver medal – second place	Herning 2009	96 kg
Silver medal – second place	Budapest 2013	96 kg
Silver medal – second place	Tashkent 2014	97 kg
Silver medal – second place	Las Vegas 2015	97 kg
European Games
Gold medal – first place	Baku 2015	97 kg
European Championship
Gold medal – first place	Vilnius 2009	96 kg
Gold medal – first place	Baku 2010	96 kg
Gold medal – first place	Dortmund 2011	96 kg
Silver medal – second place	Vantaa 2014	97 kg

Khetag Gazyumov (also Gozyumov, Iron Ossetic: Гозымты Русланы фырт Хетæг, Gozymty Ruslany fyrt Xetæg; Russian: Хетаг Русланович Гозюмов, Khetag Ruslanovich Gozyumov; Azerbaijani: Xetaq Qazümov; born 24 April 1981) is a retired Russian and Azerbaijani freestyle wrestler of Ossetian origin. Competing in the 96 some kg weight category he won bronze medals at the 2008 and 2012 Summer Olympics and a silver at the 2016 Rio Games. He also won four gold and four silver medal at the European and world championships in 2009–2014 and a gold medal at the 2015 European Games.

Gazyumov took up wrestling in 1990 and started competing in 1994. He eventually developed a cardiac arrhythmia, which led to his collapse after the quarterfinal match at the 2012 Olympics.
