= Reza Yazdani =

Iranian sport wrestler (born 1984)

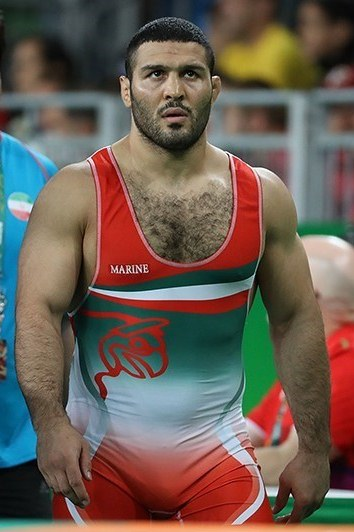
- Reza Yazdani in 2016 Summer Olympics

Personal information
- Full name: Reza Yazdani Cherati
- Nickname: The Leopard of Juybar
- Nationality: Iran
- Born: August 25, 1984 (age 42) Juybar, Mazandaran, Iran
- Height: 174 cm (5 ft 9 in)
- Weight: 97 kg (214 lb)
- Website: Official Instagram Profile

Sport
- Country: Iran
- Sport: Wrestling
Medal record
Representing Iran
Men's freestyle wrestling
World Championships
Gold medal – first place	2011 Istanbul	96 kg
Gold medal – first place	2013 Budapest	96 kg
Bronze medal – third place	2006 Guangzhou	84 kg
Bronze medal – third place	2007 Baku	84 kg
Asian Games
Gold medal – first place	2006 Doha	84 kg
Gold medal – first place	2010 Guangzhou	96 kg
Gold medal – first place	2014 Incheon	97 kg
Asian Championships
Gold medal – first place	2010 New Delhi	96 kg
Gold medal – first place	2016 Bangkok	97 kg
Gold medal – first place	2019 Xi'an	97 kg
Grand Prix
Gold medal – first place	2006 Baku	84 kg
Gold medal – first place	2012 Madrid	96 kg
Gold medal – first place	2016 Tehran	97 kg
Bronze medal – third place	2019 Ruse	97 kg

Reza Yazdani (Persian: رضا یزدانی, born August 25, 1984, in Juybar, Iran), nicknamed The Leopard of Juybar, is an Iranian wrestler and two-time world champion who won gold in the 2011 World Wrestling Championships and 2013 World Wrestling Championships in the 96 kg division. He also won the gold medal in 2006 Asian Games in the 84 kg division and the gold medal in 2010 Asian Games in the 96 kg division, as well as the gold medal in 2014 Asian Games in 97 kg division. He competed in the London 2012 Olympics and also defeated Abdusalam Gadisov but was injured in the semi-final versus his Ukrainian competitor, Valeriy Andriytsev. Yazdani came back from injury for the 2013 World Wrestling Championships in Budapest, where he won the gold medal in the 96 kg division by defeating Khetag Gazyumov of Azerbaijan in the finals by a score of 4–2.

As of May 2022, Yazdani was appointed as the head coach of the Turkmenistan National Freestyle team.

== See also ==
- List of World and Olympic Champions in men's freestyle wrestling
