= Valeriy Andriytsev =

Ukrainian freestyle wrestler

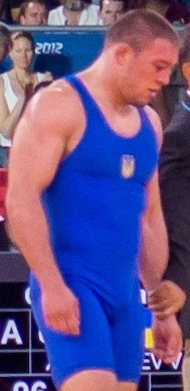

Personal information
- Full name: Valerii Andriitsev
- Nationality: Ukrainian
- Born: February 27, 1987 (age 39) Kozelets, Ukrainian SSR, Soviet Union
- Height: 6 ft 2 in (1.88 m)
- Weight: 225 lb (102 kg)

Sport
- Sport: Wrestling
- Event: Freestyle
- Club: Dynamo
Medal record
Men's freestyle wrestling
Representing Ukraine
Olympic Games
Silver medal – second place	2012 London	96 kg
World Championships
Bronze medal – third place	Tashkent 2014	97 kg
European Games
Bronze medal – third place	2015 Baku	97 kg
European Championships
Silver medal – second place	2012 Belgrade	96 kg
U20 World Championships
Gold medal – first place	Beijing 2007	96 kg
- Updated on September 7, 2012

Valerii Oleksandrovych Andriitsev (Ukrainian: Валерій Олександрович Андрійцев; born 27 February 1987 in Kozelets) is a male freestyle wrestler from Ukraine. He won the silver medal in the Men's freestyle 96 kg at 2012 Summer Olympics. He won the silver in the 2012 European Wrestling Championships. At the 2014 World Wrestling Championships he took the bronze medal after winning a rematch against American Jake Varner, who beat him in the gold medal match at the 2012 Olympics. In June 2015, he earned bronze at the inaugural European Games for Ukraine in wrestling, more specifically, in the men's freestyle in the - 97 kg division.
