= Javier Cortina =

Cuban freestyle wrestler

Personal information
- Born: 12 April 1987 (age 39) Santiago de Cuba, Cuba

Sport
- Sport: Freestyle wrestling
Medal record
Representing Cuba
Men's Freestyle Wrestling
World Wrestling Championships
Bronze medal – third place	2014 Tashkent	97 kg

Javier Cortina Lacerra (born 12 April 1987) is a Cuban freestyle wrestler. He competed in the freestyle 96 kg event at the 2012 Summer Olympics and was eliminated by Khetag Pliev in the 1/8 finals. He was a bronze medalist at the 2014 World Wrestling Championships after Şamil Erdoğan of Turkey tested positive; Javier Cortina was raised to third and took the bronze medal.
