= İbrahim Bölükbaşı =

Turkish freestyle wrestler and Paralympic judoka (born 1990)

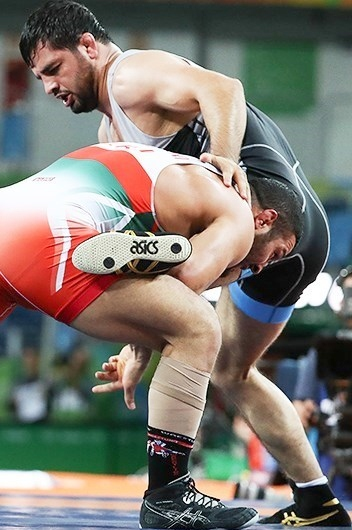
- Bölükbaşı (top) at the 2016 Olympics

Personal information
- Nationality: Turkish
- Born: 1 December 1990 (age 35) Pasinler, Erzurum, Turkey
- Height: 1.87 m (6 ft 2 in)

Sport
- Sport: Wrestling; Paralympic judo
- Event: Freestyle wrestling
- Club: Şekerspor Club, Ankara
- Coached by: Nasrullah Baysal
Medal record
Representing Turkey
Wrestling
Mediterranean Championship
Gold medal – first place	2010 Istanbul	84 kg
European Junior Championships
Silver medal – second place	2010 Samokov	84 kg
Paralympic judo
Paralympic Games
Gold medal – first place	2024 Paris	+90 kg
European Para Championships
Gold medal – first place	2023 Rotterdam	73 kg

İbrahim Bölükbaşı (born 1 December 1990) is a Turkish freestyle wrestler and judoka. He competed in freestyle wrestling in the 84 kg event at the 2012 Summer Olympics and the 97 kg event at the 2016 Summer Olympics, and was eliminated in early rounds. He took up wrestling aged 11. He also competed in Paralympic judo in the 100 kg event at the 2016 Summer Paralympics.
