= Radosław Baran =

Polish freestyle wrestler

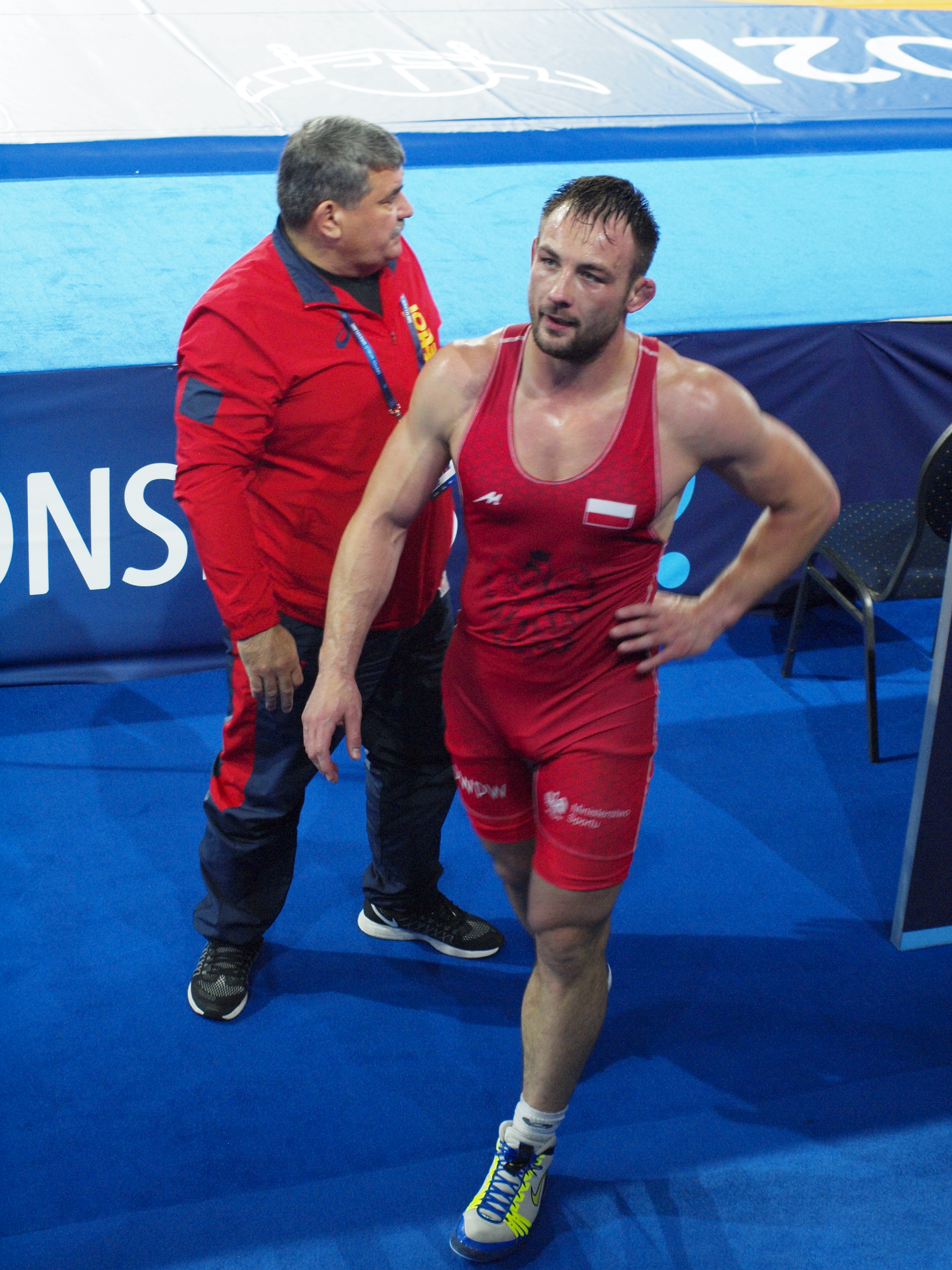
- Radosław Baran at the 2021 World Wrestling Championships in Oslo, Norway

Personal information
- Born: 5 November 1989 (age 36) Krotoszyn, Poland

Sport
- Country: Poland
- Sport: Amateur wrestling
- Event: Freestyle
Medal record
European Championships
Bronze medal – third place	2021 Warsaw	97 kg
Poland Open (Wacław Ziółkowski Memorial)
Silver medal – second place	2023 Warsaw	97 kg
Bronze medal – third place	2020 Warsaw	97 kg
Grand Prix
Gold medal – first place	2016 Sofia	97 kg
Bronze medal – third place	2022 Madrid	97 kg
Bronze medal – third place	2021 Nice	97 kg

Radosław Baran (born 5 November 1989 in Krotoszyn, Poland) is a Polish freestyle wrestler. He competed in the men's freestyle 97 kg event at the 2016 Summer Olympics, in which he was eliminated in the repechage by Reza Yazdani.

In March 2021, he competed at the European Qualification Tournament in Budapest, Hungary hoping to qualify for the 2020 Summer Olympics in Tokyo, Japan. He won his first match against Samuel Scherrer of Switzerland but he was then eliminated from the competition in his next match against Erik Thiele of Germany.

He competed at the 2024 European Wrestling Olympic Qualification Tournament in Baku, Azerbaijan hoping to qualify for the 2024 Summer Olympics in Paris, France. He was eliminated in his second match and he did not qualify for the Olympics.

His brother Robert is also a freestyle wrestler.
