= Nicolae Ceban =

Moldovan freestyle wrestler

Nicolai Ceban (born 30 March 1986) is a Moldovan freestyle wrestler. At the 2008 Summer Olympics in the freestyle 96 kg event, he was knocked out in the first round by Gergely Kiss.

He competed in the freestyle 96 kg event at the 2012 Summer Olympics; after defeating Sinivie Boltic in the 1/8 finals, he was eliminated by Giorgi Gogshelidze in the quarterfinals.

Ceban competed in the freestyle 97 kg event at the 2016 Summer Olympics in Rio de Janeiro. He was defeated by Albert Saritov of Romania in the first elimination round. He was the flagbearer for Moldova during the Parade of Nations.
