= 2018 European Wrestling Championships – Men's freestyle 97 kg =

The men's freestyle 97 kg is a competition featured at the 2018 European Wrestling Championships, and was held in Kaspiysk, Russia on May 4 and May 5.

== Medalists ==
Gold	Vladislav Baitcaev; Russia
Silver	Aliaksandr Hushtyn; Belarus
Bronze	Nurmagomed Gadzhiev; Azerbaijan
Bronze	Elizbar Odikadze; Georgia

== Results ==
Legend

- F — Won by fall

=== Main Bracket ===
1/8 finals
Aliaksandr Hushtyn (BLR)	5
Gennadij Cudinovic (GER)	0
Elizbar Odikadze (GEO)	9
Georgii Rubaev (MDA)	0
Abraham Conyedo (ITA)	0
Vladislav Baitcaev (RUS)	10
Murazi Mchedlidze (UKR)	10
Ragnar Kaasik (EST)	0
Pavlo Oliynyk (HUN)	5
Rıza Yıldırım (TUR)	2

Quarterfinals
Nurmagomed Gadzhiev (AZE)	3
Georgy Ketoev (ARM)	0
Magomedgadzhi Nurov (MKD)	2
Aliaksandr Hushtyn (BLR)	6
Elizbar Odikadze (GEO)	0
Vladislav Baitcaev (RUS)	4^{F}
Murazi Mchedlidze (UKR)	6
Pavlo Oliynyk (HUN)	0

Semifinals
Nurmagomed Gadzhiev (AZE)	7
Aliaksandr Hushtyn (BLR)	7
Vladislav Baitcaev (RUS)	11
Murazi Mchedlidze (UKR)	0

Final
Aliaksandr Hushtyn (BLR)	0
Vladislav Baitcaev (RUS)	7

=== Repechage ===
Repechage round 1
Gennadij Cudinovic (GER)	0
Magomedgadzhi Nurov (MKD)	11^{F}
Abraham Conyedo (ITA)	4
Elizbar Odikadze (GEO)	5

Bronze medal match
Magomedgadzhi Nurov (MKD)	0
Nurmagomed Gadzhiev (AZE)	4
Elizbar Odikadze (GEO)	5^{F}
Murazi Mchedlidze (UKR)	2
