= 2020 European Wrestling Championships – Men's freestyle 97 kg =

Wrestling competition

The men's freestyle 97 kg is a competition featured at the 2020 European Wrestling Championships, and was held in Rome, Italy on February 14 and February 15.

== Medalists ==
Gold	Abdulrashid Sadulaev; Russia
Silver	Albert Saritov; Romania
Bronze	Abraham Conyedo; Italy
Bronze	Elizbar Odikadze; Georgia

== Results ==
Legend

- F — Won by fall

=== Final ===
Final
Albert Saritov (ROU)	0
Abdulrashid Sadulaev (RUS)	6

=== Top half ===
Round of 32

Round of 16
Nicolai Ceban (MDA)	2
Radosław Baran (POL)	4
Abraham Conyedo (ITA)	4
Albert Saritov (ROU)	6
Christos Petridis (GRE)	11
Alejandro Cañada (ESP)	4
Gennadij Cudinovic (GER)	14
Lukas Krasauskas (LTU)	6

Quarterfinals
Radosław Baran (POL)	1
Albert Saritov (ROU)	5
Christos Petridis (GRE)	2
Gennadij Cudinovic (GER)	13

Semifinals
Albert Saritov (ROU)	10
Gennadij Cudinovic (GER)	0

=== Bottom half ===
Round of 32
Murazi Mchedlidze (UKR)	6
İbrahim Bölükbaşı (TUR)	11
Magomedgaji Nurov (MKD)	2
Abdulrashid Sadulaev (RUS)	8

Round of 16
Georgi Dimitrov (BUL)	2
Dzianis Khramiankou (BLR)	11
Elizbar Odikadze (GEO)	5
Sargis Hovsepyan (ARM)	0
Nurmagomed Gadzhiev (AZE)	7
Pavel Olejnyik (HUN)	2
İbrahim Bölükbaşı (TUR)	4
Abdulrashid Sadulaev (RUS)	9

Quarterfinals
Dzianis Khramiankou (BLR)	3
Elizbar Odikadze (GEO)	6
Nurmagomed Gadzhiev (AZE)	4
Abdulrashid Sadulaev (RUS)	10

Semifinals
Elizbar Odikadze (GEO)	0
Abdulrashid Sadulaev (RUS)	6

=== Repechage ===
Repechage round 1
Magomedgadzhi Nurov (MKD)	7^{F}
İbrahim Bölükbaşı (TUR)	0

Repechage round 2
Abraham Conyedo (ITA)	8
Radosław Baran (POL)	2
Magomedgadzhi Nurov (MKD)	4
Nurmagomed Gadzhiev (AZE)	7

Bronze medal match
Abraham Conyedo (ITA)	4
Gennadij Cudinovic (GER)	0
Nurmagomed Gadzhiev (AZE)	2
Elizbar Odikadze (GEO)	3

== Final standing ==
Rank	Athlete
1st place, gold medalist(s)	Abdulrashid Sadulaev (RUS)
2nd place, silver medalist(s)	Albert Saritov (ROU)
3rd place, bronze medalist(s)	Abraham Conyedo (ITA)
3rd place, bronze medalist(s)	Elizbar Odikadze (GEO)
5	Gennadij Cudinovic (GER)
5	Nurmagomed Gadzhiev (AZE)
7	Magomedgadzhi Nurov (MKD)
8	Radosław Baran (POL)
9	İbrahim Bölükbaşı (TUR)
10	Dzianis Khramiankou (BLR)
11	Christos Petridis (GRE)
12	Murazi Mchedlidze (UKR)
13	Lukas Krasauskas (LTU)
14	Alejandro Cañada (ESP)
15	Nicolai Ceban (MDA)
16	Pavel Olejnyik (HUN)
17	Georgi Dimitrov (BUL)
18	Sargis Hovsepyan (ARM)
