= 2017 European Wrestling Championships – Men's freestyle 97 kg =

The men's freestyle 97 kg is a competition featured at the 2017 European Wrestling Championships, and was held in Novi Sad, Serbia on May 3.

== Medalists ==
Gold	Rıza Yıldırım; Turkey
Silver	Aliaksandr Hushtyn; Belarus
Bronze	Mihail Ganev; Bulgaria
Bronze	Elizbar Odikadze; Georgia

- The winner of the silver medal in the 97 kg category, Anzor Boltukaev from Russia, was disqualified and deprived of the medal due to doping.

== Results ==
Legend

- F — Won by fall

=== Final ===
Final
~~Anzor Boltukaev (RUS)~~	2
Rıza Yıldırım (TUR)	4

=== Top half ===
==== Section 1 ====
Round of 32

Round of 16
Héctor Rodríguez (ESP)	0
Timofei Xenidis (GRE)	10
Jozef Jaloviar (SVK)	0
Mihail Ganev (BUL)	4
Aliaksandr Hushtyn (BLR)	10
Alexios Kaouslidis (CYP)	0
Murazi Mchedlidze (UKR)	3
~~Anzor Boltukaev (RUS)~~	5

Quarterfinals
Timofei Xenidis (GRE)	5
Mihail Ganev (BUL)	6
Aliaksandr Hushtyn (BLR)	5
~~Anzor Boltukaev (RUS)~~	8

Semifinals
Mihail Ganev (BUL)	0
~~Anzor Boltukaev (RUS)~~	11

=== Bottom half ===
Round of 32
Andris Ozoliņš-Ozols (LAT)	0
Ragnar Kaasik (EST)	11
Nicolae Ceban (MDA)	9
Attila Szmik (HUN)	0
Elizbar Odikadze (GEO)	4
Gabriel Seregelyi (GER)	1
Egzon Shala (ALB)	0
Aslanbek Alborov (AZE)	10
Tarik Azouzzi (BEL)	0
Georgy Ketoyev (ARM)	10

Round of 16
Marko Jovanović (SRB)	0
Magomedgadzhi Nurov (MKD)	10
Rıza Yıldırım (TUR)	10
Ragnar Kaasik (EST)	0
Nicolae Ceban (MDA)	3
Elizbar Odikadze (GEO)	4
Aslanbek Alborov (AZE)	11
Georgy Ketoyev (ARM)	1

Quarterfinals
Magomedgadzhi Nurov (MKD)	4
Rıza Yıldırım (TUR)	7
Elizbar Odikadze (GEO)	4
Aslanbek Alborov (AZE)	1

Semifinals
Rıza Yıldırım (TUR)	8
Elizbar Odikadze (GEO)	2

=== Repechage ===
Repechage round 2
Murazi Mchedlidze (UKR)	0
Aliaksandr Hushtyn (BLR)	10
Ragnar Kaasik (EST)	0
Magomedgadzhi Nurov (MKD)	10

Bronze medals
Aliaksandr Hushtyn (BLR)	7
Mihail Ganev (BUL)	0
Magomedgadzhi Nurov (MKD)	0
Elizbar Odikadze (GEO)	10
