= 2019 European Wrestling Championships – Men's freestyle 97 kg =

The men's freestyle 97 kg is a competition featured at the 2019 European Wrestling Championships, and was held in Bucharest, Romania on April 8–9, 2019.

== Medalists ==
Gold	Abdulrashid Sadulaev; Russia
Silver	Aliaksandr Hushtyn; Belarus
Bronze	Nurmagomed Gadzhiev; Azerbaijan
Bronze	Elizbar Odikadze; Georgia

== Results ==
Legend

- F — Won by fall
- WO — Won by walkover

=== Final ===
Final
Abdulrashid Sadulaev (RUS)	3
Aliaksandr Hushtyn (BLR)	1

=== Top half ===
Round of 32

Round of 16
Gennadij Cudinovic (GER)	6
Sargis Hovsepyan (ARM)	1
Abdulrashid Sadulaev (RUS)	3
Nurmagomed Gadzhiev (AZE)	0
Simone Iannattoni (ITA)	0
Magomedgadzhi Nurov (NMK)	11
Murazi Mchedlidze (UKR)	WO
Alexios Kaouslidis (CYP)

Quarterfinals
Gennadij Cudinovic (GER)	2
Abdulrashid Sadulaev (RUS)	12
Magomedgadzhi Nurov (NMK)	5
Murazi Mchedlidze (UKR)	4

Semifinals
Abdulrashid Sadulaev (RUS)	12
Magomedgadzhi Nurov (NMK)	0

=== Bottom half ===
Round of 32
Christos Samartsidis (GRE)	0
Nikolay Chterev (BUL)	4
Elizbar Odikadze (GEO)	9
Radosław Baran (POL)	5

Round of 16
Michael Manea (ROU)	0
Nicolae Ceban (MDA)	10
Mihály Szabó (HUN)	2
Aliaksandr Hushtyn (BLR)	13
Fatih Yaşarlı (TUR)	6
Lukas Krasauskas (LTU)	1
Nikolay Chterev (BUL)	1
Elizbar Odikadze (GEO)	7

Quarterfinals
Nicolae Ceban (MDA)	0
Aliaksandr Hushtyn (BLR)	3
Fatih Yaşarlı (TUR)	0
Elizbar Odikadze (GEO)	2

Semifinals
Aliaksandr Hushtyn (BLR)	2
Elizbar Odikadze (GEO)	1

=== Repechage ===
Repechage round 1
Nurmagomed Gadzhiev (AZE)	10
Gennadij Cudinovic (GER)	0
Mihály Szabó (HUN)	2
Nicolae Ceban (MDA)	8

Bronze medal match
Nurmagomed Gadzhiev (AZE)	5
Magomedgadzhi Nurov (NMK)	0
Nicolae Ceban (MDA)	0
Elizbar Odikadze (GEO)	3
