= 2018 World Wrestling Championships – Men's freestyle 97 kg =

Men's freestyle 97 kg at the 2018 World Championships
- Venue: László Papp Budapest Sports Arena
- Dates: 22–23 October 2018
- Competitors: 25 from 25 nations

Medalists
gold medal	Abdulrashid Sadulaev	Russia
silver medal	Kyle Snyder	United States
bronze medal	Abraham Conyedo	Italy
bronze medal	Elizbar Odikadze	Georgia

The men's freestyle 97 kilograms is a competition featured at the 2018 World Wrestling Championships, and was held in Budapest, Hungary on 22 and 23 October.

This freestyle wrestling competition consists of a single-elimination tournament, with a repechage used to determine the winner of two bronze medals. The two finalists face off for gold and silver medals. Each wrestler who loses to one of the two finalists moves into the repechage, culminating in a pair of bronze medal matches featuring the semifinal losers each facing the remaining repechage opponent from their half of the bracket.

== Results ==
Legend

- F — Won by fall
- WO — Won by walkover

=== Final ===
Final
Kyle Snyder (USA)	0
Abdulrashid Sadulaev (RUS)	2^{F}

=== Top half ===
Round of 32
Kyle Snyder (USA)	8
Ölziisaikhany Batzul (MGL)	3
Takeshi Yamaguchi (JPN)	10
Zach Merrill (PUR)	0
Abraham Conyedo (ITA)	2
Erik Thiele (GER)	0

Round of 16
Murazi Mchedlidze (UKR)	2
Jordan Steen (CAN)	5
Pavlo Oliynyk (HUN)	WO
~~Ricardo Báez (ARG)~~
Nathaniel Tuamoheloa (ASA)	0
Kyle Snyder (USA)	10
Takeshi Yamaguchi (JPN)	2
Abraham Conyedo (ITA)	7

Quarterfinals
Jordan Steen (CAN)	0
Pavlo Oliynyk (HUN)	10
Kyle Snyder (USA)	11
Abraham Conyedo (ITA)	2

Semifinals
Pavlo Oliynyk (HUN)	0
Kyle Snyder (USA)	3

=== Bottom half ===
Round of 32
José Daniel Díaz (VEN)	12
Mausam Khatri (IND)	2
Kim Jae-gang (KOR)	3
Yang Chaoqiang (CHN)	1
Aslanbek Alborov (AZE)	10
Mojtaba Goleij (IRI)	0
Mamed Ibragimov (KAZ)	2
Georgy Ketoev (ARM)	2
Abdulrashid Sadulaev (RUS)	11
Magomedgaji Nurov (MKD)	0
Fatih Yaşarlı (TUR)	3
Magomed Ibragimov (UZB)	6

Round of 16
Elizbar Odikadze (GEO)	10
José Daniel Díaz (VEN)	0
Kim Jae-gang (KOR)	0
Aslanbek Alborov (AZE)	11^{F}
Mamed Ibragimov (KAZ)	3
Abdulrashid Sadulaev (RUS)	14
Magomed Ibragimov (UZB)	11
Aliaksandr Hushtyn (BLR)	7

Quarterfinals
Elizbar Odikadze (GEO)	4
Aslanbek Alborov (AZE)	3
Abdulrashid Sadulaev (RUS)	10
Magomed Ibragimov (UZB)	0

Semifinals
Elizbar Odikadze (GEO)	0
Abdulrashid Sadulaev (RUS)	10

=== Repechage ===
Repechage round 1
Ölziisaikhany Batzul (MGL)	WO
Nathaniel Tuamoheloa (ASA)
Magomedgaji Nurov (MKD)	5
Mamed Ibragimov (KAZ)	2

Repechage round 2
Ölziisaikhany Batzul (MGL)	4
Abraham Conyedo (ITA)	8
Magomedgaji Nurov (MKD)	0
Magomed Ibragimov (UZB)	5

Bronze medals
Abraham Conyedo (ITA)	2
Pavlo Oliynyk (HUN)	2
Magomed Ibragimov (UZB)	2
Elizbar Odikadze (GEO)	5^{F}
