= 2013 European Wrestling Championships – Men's freestyle 96 kg =

The men's freestyle 96 kg is a competition featured at the 2013 European Wrestling Championships, and was held at the Tbilisi Sports Palace in Tbilisi, Georgia on 19 March 2013.

== Medalists ==
Gold	Pavlo Oliinyk; Ukraine
Silver	Kamil Skaskiewicz; Poland
Bronze	Lyuben Iliev; Bulgaria
Bronze	Vladislav Baitcaev; Russia

== Results ==
Legend

- F — Won by fall
- R — Retired

=== Final ===
Final
Pavlo Oliinyk (UKR)	1	4
Kamil Skaskiewicz (POL)	0	0

=== Top half ===
Round of 32

Round of 16
Jozef Jaloviar (SVK)	1	3
Vratislav Chotaš (CZE)	0	0
Pavlo Oliinyk (UKR)	3	2
Lyuben Iliev (BUL)	0	1
Egzon Shala (ALB)	2	6	1
Michael Manea (ROU)	3	0	0
Nicolae Ceban (MDA)	1	0	1
Edgar Yenokyan (ARM)	0	1	0

Quarterfinals
Jozef Jaloviar (SVK)	1	0	0
Pavlo Oliinyk (UKR)	0	6	6
Egzon Shala (ALB)	7	3
Nicolae Ceban (MDA)	2	0

Semifinals
Pavlo Oliinyk (UKR)	2	3	8
Egzon Shala (ALB)	8	0	0

=== Bottom half ===
Round of 32
Ivan Yankouski (BLR)	1	0
Elizbar Odikadze (GEO)	2	1
William Harth (GER)	6	5
Stefano Trapani (ITA)	0	0
Khetag Gazyumov (AZE)	1	3
Müren Mutlu (TUR)	0	0^{R}

Round of 16
Kamil Skaskiewicz (POL)	1	5
Imants Lagodskis (LAT)	0	1
Attila Szmik (HUN)	1	0	0
Micheil Tsikovani (GRE)	0	1	1
Vladislav Baitcaev (RUS)	1	2	1
Elizbar Odikadze (GEO)	1	0	0
William Harth (GER)	1	0
Khetag Gazyumov (AZE)	4	3

Quarterfinals
Kamil Skaskiewicz (POL)	1	5
Micheil Tsikovani (GRE)	0	0
Vladislav Baitcaev (RUS)	1	0	2
Khetag Gazyumov (AZE)	0	1	2

Semifinals
Kamil Skaskiewicz (POL)	1	2
Vladislav Baitcaev (RUS)	0	1

=== Repechage ===
Repechage round 2
Lyuben Iliev (BUL)	2	3
Jozef Jaloviar (SVK)	0	0
Imants Lagodskis (LAT)	1	0	2
Micheil Tsikovani (GRE)	0	2	0

Bronze medals
Lyuben Iliev (BUL)	2	3
Egzon Shala (ALB)	0	0
Imants Lagodskis (LAT)	2	0	0
Vladislav Baitcaev (RUS)	2	1	2
