= 2014 European Juniors Wrestling Championships =

- Host city: Warsaw, Poland
- Dates: June 17–22, 2014

Champions
- Freestyle: Turkey
- Greco-Roman: Russia
- Women: Russia

The 2014 European Juniors Wrestling Championships was held in Warsaw, Poland between June 17–22, 2014.

== Medal table ==
Rank	Nation	Gold	Silver	Bronze	Total
1	Russia	5	3	9	17
2	Georgia	5	2	4	11
3	Azerbaijan	4	2	2	8
4	Turkey	2	2	8	12
5	Armenia	2	0	2	4
6	Ukraine	1	3	6	10
7	Belarus	1	2	3	6
8	Bulgaria	1	1	1	3
9	Finland	1	1	0	2
10	Italy	1	0	0	1
10	Norway	1	0	0	1
12	Germany	0	2	2	4
12	Romania	0	2	2	4
14	Lithuania	0	2	0	2
14	Moldova	0	2	0	2
16	Hungary	0	1	3	4
17	France	0	1	0	1
18	Poland	0	0	4	4
19	Czech Republic	0	0	1	1
19	Sweden	0	0	1	1
Totals (20 entries)		24	26	48	98

== Team ranking ==
Rank	Men's freestyle		Men's Greco-Roman		Women's freestyle	
Rank	Team	Points	Team	Points	Team	Points
1	Turkey	63	Russia	59	Russia	52
2	Georgia	62	Georgia	58	Ukraine	52
3	Russia	47	Azerbaijan	45	Turkey	44
4	Ukraine	46	Armenia	37	Belarus	42
5	Azerbaijan	45	Turkey	29	Azerbaijan	38

== Medal summary ==
=== Men's freestyle ===
Event	Gold	Silver	Bronze
50 kg	(Russia) Abdulgav Shakhbanov	(Moldova) Ivan Zamfirov	(Belarus) Yauheni Rebikau
50 kg	(Russia) Abdulgav Shakhbanov	(Moldova) Ivan Zamfirov	(Turkey) Emre Demircan
55 kg	(Turkey) Barış Kaya	(Russia) Tamir Garmaev	(Poland) Tomasz Ogonowski
55 kg	(Turkey) Barış Kaya	(Russia) Tamir Garmaev	(Ukraine) Taras Markovych
60 kg	(Russia) Imam Adzhiev	(Georgia (country)) Giorgi Bergadze	(Ukraine) Ivan Bileichuk
60 kg	(Russia) Imam Adzhiev	(Georgia (country)) Giorgi Bergadze	(Armenia) Gor Grigoryan
66 kg	(Georgia (country)) Omari Gurjidze	(Bulgaria) Valentin Dimitrov	(Belarus) Surko Rashytkhanau
66 kg	(Georgia (country)) Omari Gurjidze	(Bulgaria) Valentin Dimitrov	(Poland) Kamil Rybicki
74 kg	(Georgia (country)) Tarzan Maisuradze	(Ukraine) Oleksiy Shcherbak	(Turkey) Murat Ertürk
74 kg	(Georgia (country)) Tarzan Maisuradze	(Ukraine) Oleksiy Shcherbak	(Romania) Gheorghe Bodisteanu
84 kg	(Azerbaijan) Nurmagomed Gadzhiev	(Georgia (country)) Giorgi Chkhartishvili	(Turkey) Fatih Erdin
84 kg	(Azerbaijan) Nurmagomed Gadzhiev	(Georgia (country)) Giorgi Chkhartishvili	(Ukraine) Mraz Dzhafaryan
96 kg	(Ukraine) Murazi Mchedlidze	(Russia) Zaynulla Kurbanov	(Turkey) Yusuf Can Zeybek
96 kg	(Ukraine) Murazi Mchedlidze	(Russia) Zaynulla Kurbanov	(Germany) Gennadij Cudinovic
120 kg	(Georgia (country)) Geno Petriashvili	(Turkey) Yunus Emre Dede	(Hungary) Mihaly Nagy
120 kg	(Georgia (country)) Geno Petriashvili	(Turkey) Yunus Emre Dede	(Russia) Kazbek Khubulov

=== Men's Greco-Roman ===
Event	Gold	Silver	Bronze
50 kg	(Azerbaijan) Ibrahim Nurullayev	(Romania) Alexandru Botez	(Russia) Aleksei Kinzhigaliev
50 kg	(Azerbaijan) Ibrahim Nurullayev	(Romania) Alexandru Botez	(Turkey) Doğuş Ayazcı
55 kg	(Azerbaijan) Murad Mammadov	(Lithuania) Kristupas Sleiva	(Georgia (country)) Gizo Meladze
55 kg	(Azerbaijan) Murad Mammadov	(Lithuania) Kristupas Sleiva	(Russia) Arif Mirzaev
60 kg	(Armenia) Gevorg Gharibyan	(France) Yasin Ozay	(Germany) Etienne Kinsinger
60 kg	(Armenia) Gevorg Gharibyan	(France) Yasin Ozay	(Russia) Zhambolat Lokyaev
66 kg	(Armenia) Hrant Kalachyan	(Russia) Aleksei Tadykin	(Georgia (country)) Shamagi Bolkvadze
66 kg	(Armenia) Hrant Kalachyan	(Russia) Aleksei Tadykin	(Poland) Mateusz Bernatek
74 kg	(Georgia (country)) Gela Bolkvadze	(Moldova) Mihail Bradu	(Turkey) Furkan Bayrak
74 kg	(Georgia (country)) Gela Bolkvadze	(Moldova) Mihail Bradu	(Russia) Ali Bobotaev
84 kg	(Azerbaijan) Islam Abbasov	(Germany) Denis Kudla	(Georgia (country)) Lasha Gobadze
84 kg	(Azerbaijan) Islam Abbasov	(Germany) Denis Kudla	(Russia) Gadzhimurad Dzhalalov
96 kg	(Norway) Felix Baldauf	(Belarus) Dzmitry Kaminski	(Armenia) Karen Abgaryan
96 kg	(Norway) Felix Baldauf	(Belarus) Dzmitry Kaminski	(Georgia (country)) Kukuri Kirtskhalia
120 kg	(Georgia (country)) Beka Kandelaki	(Lithuania) Mantas Knystautas	(Ukraine) Vladyslav Voronyi
120 kg	(Georgia (country)) Beka Kandelaki	(Lithuania) Mantas Knystautas	(Russia) Sergey Semenov

=== Women's freestyle ===
Event	Gold	Silver	Bronze
44 kg	(Bulgaria) Miglena Selishka	(Belarus) Kseniya Stankevich	(Azerbaijan) Turkan Nasirova
44 kg	(Bulgaria) Miglena Selishka	(Belarus) Kseniya Stankevich	(Russia) Aziyata Khomushku
48 kg	(Belarus) Viyaleta Chyryk	(Turkey) Evin Demirhan	(Poland) Paula Kozłow
48 kg	(Belarus) Viyaleta Chyryk	(Turkey) Evin Demirhan	(Bulgaria) Elitsa Yankova
51 kg	(Russia) Natalia Malysheva	(Romania) Simona Pricob	(Hungary) Mercedesz Denes
51 kg	(Russia) Natalia Malysheva	(Romania) Simona Pricob	(Ukraine) Lilya Horishna
55 kg	(Russia) Olga Khoroshavtseva	(Germany) Jenny Singer	(Turkey) Bediha Gün
55 kg	(Russia) Olga Khoroshavtseva	(Germany) Jenny Singer	(Belarus) Sviatlana Lamashevich
59 kg	(Finland) Petra Olli	(Ukraine) Oksana Herhel	(Romania) Kriszta Incze
59 kg	(Finland) Petra Olli	(Ukraine) Oksana Herhel	(Hungary) Ramóna Galambos
63 kg	(Turkey) Buse Tosun	(Azerbaijan) Elmira Gambarova	(Russia) Liubov Ovcharova
63 kg	(Turkey) Buse Tosun	(Azerbaijan) Elmira Gambarova	(Czech Republic) Adela Hanzlickova
67 kg	(Italy) Dalma Caneva	(Ukraine) Nataliya Mazur	(Azerbaijan) Ragneta Gurbanzade
67 kg	(Italy) Dalma Caneva	(Ukraine) Nataliya Mazur	(Sweden) Moa Nygren
72 kg	(Russia) Anzhela Kataeva	(Hungary) Zsanett Nemeth	(Turkey) Gamze Durukan
72 kg	(Russia) Anzhela Kataeva	(Hungary) Zsanett Nemeth	(Ukraine) Anastasiia Shustova

Preceded by 2013 Skopje	European Juniors Wrestling Championships; 2014	Succeeded by 2015 Istanbul
