= 2013 World Wrestling Championships – Men's freestyle 96 kg =

Men's freestyle 96 kg at the 2013 World Championships
- Venue: László Papp Budapest Sports Arena
- Dates: 16 September 2013
- Competitors: 33 from 33 nations

Medalists
gold medal	Reza Yazdani	Iran
silver medal	Khetag Gazyumov	Azerbaijan
bronze medal	Anzor Boltukaev	Russia
bronze medal	Pavlo Oliynyk	Ukraine

The men's freestyle 96 kilograms is a competition featured at the 2013 World Wrestling Championships, and was held at the László Papp Budapest Sports Arena in Budapest, Hungary on 16 September 2013.

== Results ==
Legend

- F — Won by fall

=== Finals ===
Semifinals		Final
Anzor Boltukaev (RUS)	2
Khetag Gazyumov (AZE)	4	Khetag Gazyumov (AZE)	2
Reza Yazdani (IRI)	8	Reza Yazdani (IRI)	4
Pavlo Oliynyk (UKR)	1

=== Top half ===
==== Section 1 ====
Round of 64

Round of 32
Anzor Boltukaev (RUS)	6
William Harth (GER)	4
Dorjkhandyn Khüderbulga (MGL)	0
Taimuraz Tigiyev (KAZ)	8
Takeshi Yamaguchi (JPN)	9
Attila Szmik (HUN)	1
Jhosser González (VEN)	0
Micheil Tsikovani (GRE)	4^{F}

Round of 16
Anzor Boltukaev (RUS)	6
Taimuraz Tigiyev (KAZ)	0
Takeshi Yamaguchi (JPN)	7
Micheil Tsikovani (GRE)	0

Quarterfinals
Anzor Boltukaev (RUS)	14
Takeshi Yamaguchi (JPN)	6

==== Section 2 ====
Round of 64

Round of 32
J. D. Bergman (USA)	3
Aleksey Krupnyakov (KGZ)	4^{F}
Michael Manea (ROU)	0
Jozef Jaloviar (SVK)	7
Kamil Skaskiewicz (POL)	8
Simas Asačiovas (LTU)	0
Khetag Gazyumov (AZE)	8
Yuri Maier (ARG)	0

Round of 16
Aleksey Krupnyakov (KGZ)	13
Jozef Jaloviar (SVK)	5
Kamil Skaskiewicz (POL)	1
Khetag Gazyumov (AZE)	4

Quarterfinals
Aleksey Krupnyakov (KGZ)	0
Khetag Gazyumov (AZE)	8

=== Bottom half ===
==== Section 3 ====
Round of 64

Round of 32
Manjot Sandhu (CAN)	12
Rıza Yıldırım (TUR)	8
Ivan Yankouski (BLR)	3
Reza Yazdani (IRI)	7
Egzon Shala (ALB)	12^{F}
Edgar Yenokyan (ARM)	3
Dato Kerashvili (GEO)	2
Kim Jae-gang (KOR)	1

Round of 16
Manjot Sandhu (CAN)	0
Reza Yazdani (IRI)	7
Egzon Shala (ALB)	5
Dato Kerashvili (GEO)	12

Quarterfinals
Reza Yazdani (IRI)	8
Dato Kerashvili (GEO)	2

==== Section 4 ====
Round of 64
Juan Izidoro (BRA)	0
Imants Lagodskis (LAT)	7

Round of 32
Satyawart Kadian (IND)	10^{F}
Gamini Achchillage (SRI)	0
Zhang Xueyi (CHN)	2
Nicolae Ceban (MDA)	9
Pavlo Oliynyk (UKR)	7
Vratislav Chotaš (CZE)	0
Lyuben Iliev (BUL)	7
Imants Lagodskis (LAT)	1

Round of 16
Satyawart Kadian (IND)	2
Nicolae Ceban (MDA)	5
Pavlo Oliynyk (UKR)	7
Lyuben Iliev (BUL)	0

Quarterfinals
Nicolae Ceban (MDA)	2
Pavlo Oliynyk (UKR)	5

=== Repechage ===
Repechage round 2
Yuri Maier (ARG)	2
Kamil Skaskiewicz (POL)	11
Ivan Yankouski (BLR)	8
Manjot Sandhu (CAN)	0

Repechage round 3
Kamil Skaskiewicz (POL)	1
Aleksey Krupnyakov (KGZ)	8
Ivan Yankouski (BLR)	7
Dato Kerashvili (GEO)	9

Bronze medals
Aleksey Krupnyakov (KGZ)	5
Anzor Boltukaev (RUS)	8
Dato Kerashvili (GEO)	2
Pavlo Oliynyk (UKR)	10
