= Wrestling at the 2019 European Games – Men's freestyle 97 kg =

Men's freestyle 97 kg at the 2019 European Games
- Venue: Minsk Sports Palace
- Date: 26 June and 27 June
- Competitors: 15 from 15 nations

Medalists
| gold medal | Abdulrashid Sadulaev | Russia |
| silver medal | Nurmagomed Gadzhiev | Azerbaijan |
| bronze medal | Aliaksandr Hushtyn | Belarus |
| bronze medal | Elizbar Odikadze | Georgia |

The men's freestyle 97 kilograms wrestling competition at the 2019 European Games in Minsk was held on 26 to 27 June 2019 at the Minsk Sports Palace.

== Schedule ==
All times are in FET (UTC+03:00)

| Date | Time | Event |
|---|---|---|
| Wednesday, 26 June 2019 | 12:20 | 1/8 finals |
| Wednesday, 26 June 2019 | 13:40 | Quarterfinals |
| Wednesday, 26 June 2019 | 18:20 | Semifinals |
| Thursday, 27 June 2019 | 11:10 | Repechage |
| Thursday, 27 June 2019 | 19:30 | Finals |

== Results ==
Legend

- F — Won by fall
- WO — Won by Walkover

=== Main bracket ===
1/8 finals
Nikolay Chterev (BUL) | 0
Aliaksandr Hushtyn (BLR) | 9
Magomedgadzhi Nurov (MKD) | 10
Lukas Krasauskas (LTU) | 0
Mihály Szabó (HUN) | 0
Abdulrashid Sadulaev (RUS) | 11
Nurmagomed Gadzhiev (AZE) | 8
Radosław Baran (POL) | 0
Sargis Hovsepyan (ARM) | 2
Elizbar Odikadze (GEO) | 13
Christos Samartsidis (GRE) | 2
Nicolae Ceban (MDA) | 10^{F}
Baki Şahin (TUR) | 0
Murazi Mchedlidze (UKR) | 6

Quarterfinals
Gennadij Cudinovic (GER) | 0
Aliaksandr Hushtyn (BLR) | 10
Magomedgadzhi Nurov (MKD) | 0
Abdulrashid Sadulaev (RUS) | 6
Nurmagomed Gadzhiev (AZE) | 7
Elizbar Odikadze (GEO) | 3
Nicolae Ceban (MDA) | 5
Murazi Mchedlidze (UKR) | 6

Semifinals
Aliaksandr Hushtyn (BLR) | 0
Abdulrashid Sadulaev (RUS) | 6
Nurmagomed Gadzhiev (AZE) | 7
Murazi Mchedlidze (UKR) | 0

Final
Abdulrashid Sadulaev (RUS) | WO
Nurmagomed Gadzhiev (AZE)

=== Repechage ===
Repechage round 1
Mihály Szabó (HUN) | 0
Magomedgadzhi Nurov (MKD) | 11
Radosław Baran (POL) | 2
Elizbar Odikadze (GEO) | 3

Bronze medals
Magomedgadzhi Nurov (MKD) | 1
Aliaksandr Hushtyn (BLR) | 3
Elizbar Odikadze (GEO) | 5
Murazi Mchedlidze (UKR) | 0
