= Egzon Shala =

Kosovo-Albanian freestyle wrestler

Personal information
- Nationality: Albanian / Kosovan
- Born: 23 November 1990 (age 35) Suva Reka, SFR Yugoslavia (present-day Kosovo)
- Height: 192 cm (6 ft 4 in)
- Weight: 100 kg (220 lb)

Sport
- Sport: Wrestling
- Event: Freestyle
Medal record
Men's freestyle wrestling
Representing Albania
Mediterranean Games
Bronze medal – third place	2013 Mersin	96 kg
Mediterranean Championships
Gold medal – first place	2014 Kanjiža	97 kg
- Updated on 31 March 2021

Egzon Shala (born 23 November 1990) is a Kosovan-Albanian freestyle wrestler. Representing Albania, he earned a bronze medal at the 2013 Mediterranean Games. Representing Kosovo, he qualified for the 2020 Summer Olympics from the 2019 World Wrestling Championships after he was promoted from 5th place as two athlete (Syrian Badzha Khutaba and Uzbek Khasanboy Rakhimov) were disqualified due to doping violations.

== Major results ==
Year	Tournament	Venue	Result	Event
Representing Albania
2011	World Championships	Istanbul, Turkey	35th	Freestyle 84 kg
2012	European Championships	Belgrade, Serbia	21st	Freestyle 84 kg
2013	European Championships	(Georgia (country)) Tbilisi, Georgia	5th	Freestyle 96 kg
2013	Mediterranean Games	Mersin, Turkey	3rd	Freestyle 96 kg
2013	World Championships	Budapest, Hungary	10th	Freestyle 96 kg
2014	European Championships	Vantaa, Finland	13th	Freestyle 97 kg
2014	Mediterranean Championships	Kanjiža, Serbia	1st	Freestyle 97 kg
2014	World Championships	Tashkent, Uzbekistan	6th	Freestyle 97 kg
2015	European Games	Baku, Azerbaijan	17th	Freestyle 125 kg
2015	World Championships	Las Vegas, United States	24th	Freestyle 97 kg
2016	European Championships	Riga, Latvia	14th	Freestyle 97 kg
2017	European Championships	Novi Sad, Serbia	15th	Freestyle 97 kg
Representing Kosovo
2019	European Championships	Bucharest, Romania	7th	Freestyle 125 kg
2019	World Championships	Nur-Sultan, Kazakhstan	5th	Freestyle 125 kg
2021	European Championships	Warsaw, Poland	12th	Freestyle 125 kg
2021	Olympic Games	Tokyo, Japan	7th	Freestyle 125 kg
2022	Mediterranean Games	Oran, Algeria	9th	Freestyle 125 kg
