= 2013 European Juniors Wrestling Championships =

- Host city: North Macedonia, Skopje
- Dates: July 2–7, 2013

Champions
- Freestyle: Azerbaijan
- Greco-Roman: Russia
- Women: Russia

The 2013 European Juniors Wrestling Championships was held in Skopje, North Macedonia between July 2–7, 2013.

== Medal table ==
* Host nation (North Macedonia)

Rank	Nation	Gold	Silver	Bronze	Total
1	Russia	5	3	9	17
2	Azerbaijan	4	4	5	13
3	Turkey	4	1	1	6
4	Ukraine	3	3	3	9
5	Georgia	2	1	5	8
6	Moldova	1	2	2	5
7	Bulgaria	1	1	3	5
8	Poland	1	1	0	2
9	Germany	1	0	5	6
10	Armenia	1	0	4	5
11	Finland	1	0	0	1
12	Belarus	0	2	3	5
13	Lithuania	0	2	1	3
14	Hungary	0	2	0	2
15	Romania	0	1	3	4
16	Sweden	0	1	1	2
17	Croatia	0	0	1	1
17	France	0	0	1	1
17	Serbia	0	0	1	1
Totals (19 entries)		24	24	48	96

== Team ranking ==
Rank	Men's freestyle		Men's Greco-Roman		Women's freestyle	
Rank	Team	Points	Team	Points	Team	Points
1	Azerbaijan	57	Russia	60	Russia	59
2	Russia	53	Azerbaijan	52	Ukraine	57
3	Turkey	52	Georgia	51	Bulgaria	49
4	Armenia	51	Hungary	31	Azerbaijan	40
5	Georgia	44	Moldova	28	Romania	34

== Medal summary ==
=== Men's freestyle ===
Event	Gold	Silver	Bronze
50 kg	(Turkey) Süleyman Atlı	(Azerbaijan) Ruslan Gasimov	(Russia) Aryian Tiutrin
50 kg	(Turkey) Süleyman Atlı	(Azerbaijan) Ruslan Gasimov	(Belarus) Dimchik Rinchinov
55 kg	(Azerbaijan) Ruslan Surkhayev	(Turkey) Nebi Uzun	(Armenia) Artak Hovhannisyan
55 kg	(Azerbaijan) Ruslan Surkhayev	(Turkey) Nebi Uzun	(Russia) Stepan Sorkomov
60 kg	(Ukraine) Gor Oganesyan	(Azerbaijan) Akhmednabi Gvarzatilov	(Russia) Viktor Stepanov
60 kg	(Ukraine) Gor Oganesyan	(Azerbaijan) Akhmednabi Gvarzatilov	(Bulgaria) Valentin Dimitrov
66 kg	(Turkey) Selahattin Kılıçsallayan	(Azerbaijan) Gadzhimurad Omarov	(Georgia (country)) Davit Buziashvili
66 kg	(Turkey) Selahattin Kılıçsallayan	(Azerbaijan) Gadzhimurad Omarov	(Armenia) Aren Alekyan
74 kg	(Russia) Khabib Batyrov	(Azerbaijan) Bakhtiyar Israfilli	(Georgia (country)) Lasha Gigashvili
74 kg	(Russia) Khabib Batyrov	(Azerbaijan) Bakhtiyar Israfilli	(France) Zelimkhan Khadjiev
84 kg	(Russia) Vladislav Valiev	(Belarus) Aliaksandr Hushtyn	(Germany) Erik Thiele Sven
84 kg	(Russia) Vladislav Valiev	(Belarus) Aliaksandr Hushtyn	(Armenia) Shamir Atyan
96 kg	(Turkey) Ali Bönceoğlu	(Ukraine) Murazi Mchedlidze	(Armenia) Viktor Kazishvili
96 kg	(Turkey) Ali Bönceoğlu	(Ukraine) Murazi Mchedlidze	(Romania) Vasile Vlad Caras
120 kg	(Georgia (country)) Geno Petriashvili	(Ukraine) Andriy Vlasov	(Bulgaria) Mariyan Todorov
120 kg	(Georgia (country)) Geno Petriashvili	(Ukraine) Andriy Vlasov	(Azerbaijan) Ali Magomedabirov

=== Men's Greco-Roman ===
Event	Gold	Silver	Bronze
50 kg	(Ukraine) Yevgen Udynskyy	(Georgia (country)) Irakli Shavadze	(Azerbaijan) Ramiz Mammadov
50 kg	(Ukraine) Yevgen Udynskyy	(Georgia (country)) Irakli Shavadze	(Croatia) Tony Brala
55 kg	(Azerbaijan) Sakit Quliyev	(Moldova) Alexandru Biciu	(Belarus) Yahor Beliak
55 kg	(Azerbaijan) Sakit Quliyev	(Moldova) Alexandru Biciu	(Russia) Aram Akopyan
60 kg	(Russia) Artur Suleymanov	(Azerbaijan) Elman Mukhtarov	(Moldova) Daniel Cataraga
60 kg	(Russia) Artur Suleymanov	(Azerbaijan) Elman Mukhtarov	(Germany) Deniz Menekşe
66 kg	(Poland) Mateusz Bernatek	(Russia) Artem Surkov	(Azerbaijan) Ruhin Mikhailov
66 kg	(Poland) Mateusz Bernatek	(Russia) Artem Surkov	(Serbia) Mate Nemeš
74 kg	(Armenia) Karapet Chalyan	(Russia) Adlan Akiev	(Georgia (country)) Lasha Gobadze
74 kg	(Armenia) Karapet Chalyan	(Russia) Adlan Akiev	(Moldova) Petru Sevciuc
84 kg	(Germany) Denis Kudla	(Romania) Dorian Pârvan	(Azerbaijan) Orkhan Nuriyev
84 kg	(Germany) Denis Kudla	(Romania) Dorian Pârvan	(Georgia (country)) Robert Kobliashvili
96 kg	(Russia) Musa Evloev	(Hungary) Zsolt Torok	(Georgia (country)) Kukuri Kirtskhalia
96 kg	(Russia) Musa Evloev	(Hungary) Zsolt Torok	(Lithuania) Romas Fridrikas
120 kg	(Georgia (country)) Iakobi Kajaia	(Lithuania) Mantas Knystautas	(Russia) Sergey Semenov
120 kg	(Georgia (country)) Iakobi Kajaia	(Lithuania) Mantas Knystautas	(Romania) Tiberiu Barbazan

=== Women's freestyle ===
Event	Gold	Silver	Bronze
44 kg	(Bulgaria) Miglena Selishka	(Moldova) Emilia Budeanu	(Belarus) Fatsima Sidakova
44 kg	(Bulgaria) Miglena Selishka	(Moldova) Emilia Budeanu	(Turkey) Evin Demirhan
48 kg	(Ukraine) Ilona Semkiv	(Bulgaria) Elitsa Yankova	(Romania) Emilia Alina Vuc
48 kg	(Ukraine) Ilona Semkiv	(Bulgaria) Elitsa Yankova	(Germany) Katrin Henke
51 kg	(Azerbaijan) Patimat Bagomedova	(Russia) Stalvira Orshush	(Ukraine) Lilya Horishna
51 kg	(Azerbaijan) Patimat Bagomedova	(Russia) Stalvira Orshush	(Germany) Nina Hemmer
55 kg	(Moldova) Elena Turcan	(Ukraine) Larysa Skoblyuk	(Bulgaria) Evelina Nikolova
55 kg	(Moldova) Elena Turcan	(Ukraine) Larysa Skoblyuk	(Russia) Olga Khoroshavtseva
59 kg	(Finland) Petra Olli	(Poland) Katarzyna Mądrowska	(Ukraine) Oksana Herhel
59 kg	(Finland) Petra Olli	(Poland) Katarzyna Mądrowska	(Russia) Anzhela Titenko
63 kg	(Turkey) Buse Tosun	(Sweden) Therese Persson	(Germany) Nadine Weinauge
63 kg	(Turkey) Buse Tosun	(Sweden) Therese Persson	(Russia) Anzhela Fomenko
67 kg	(Russia) Svetlana Lipatova	(Lithuania) Danutė Domikaitytė	(Sweden) Moa Nygren
67 kg	(Russia) Svetlana Lipatova	(Lithuania) Danutė Domikaitytė	(Bulgaria) Dzhanan Manolova
72 kg	(Azerbaijan) Sabira Aliyeva	(Hungary) Zsanett Nemeth	(Ukraine) Liudmyla Tychyna
72 kg	(Azerbaijan) Sabira Aliyeva	(Hungary) Zsanett Nemeth	(Russia) Tatiana Morozova

Preceded by 2012	European Juniors Wrestling Championships; 2013	Succeeded by 2014
