= Sergey Kozyrev =

Russian freestyle wrestler (born 2002)

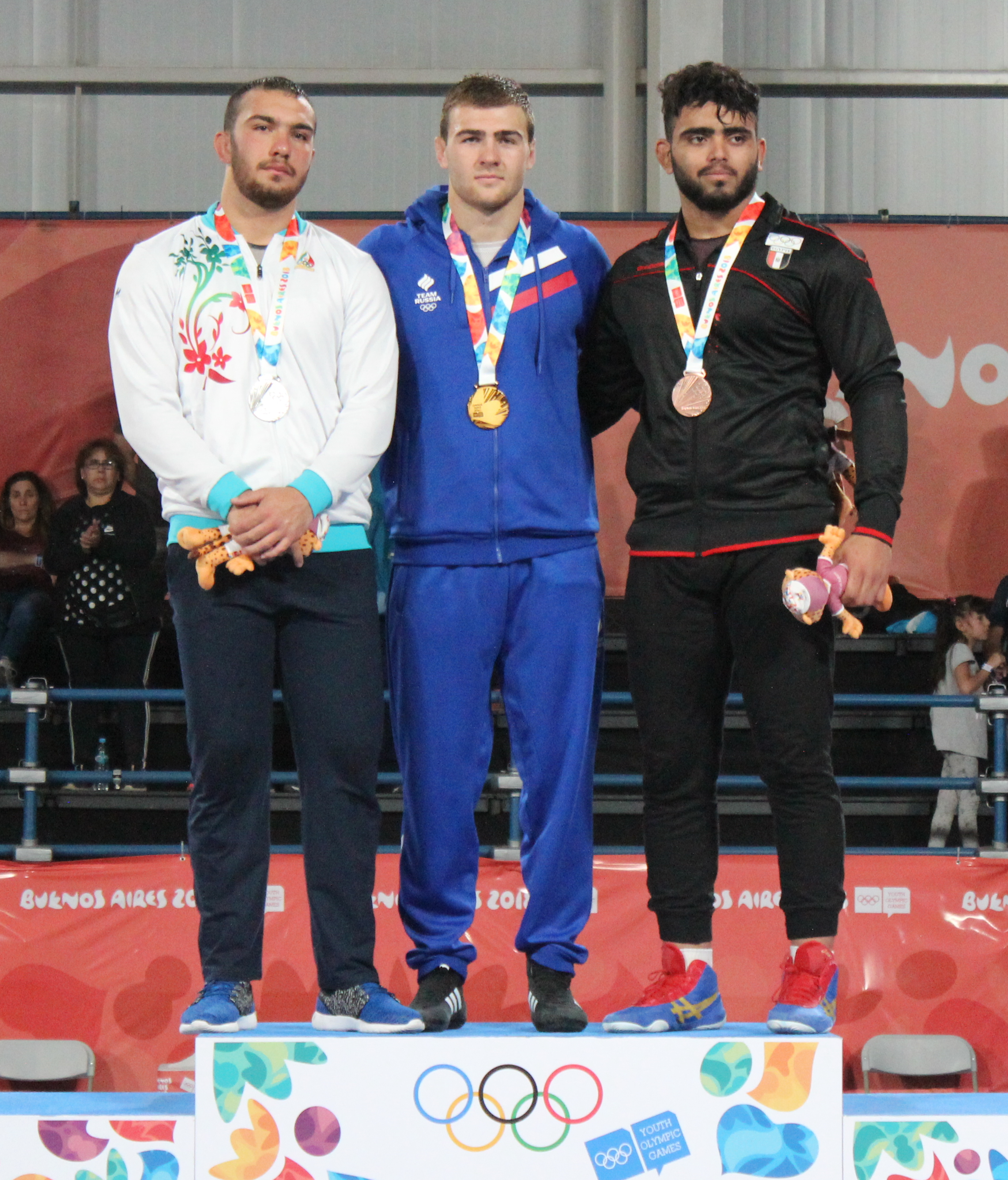
- Sergey Kozyrev in 2018 (in blue)

Personal information
- Native name: Сергей Вадимович Козырев
- Full name: Sergey Vadimovich Kozyrev
- Born: 18 September 2002 (age 23)

Sport
- Country: Russia
- Sport: Amateur wrestling
- Event: Freestyle
Medal record
Men's freestyle wrestling
Representing Russia
European Championships
Silver medal – second place	2021 Warsaw	125 kg
Youth Olympic Games
Gold medal – first place	2018 Buenos Aires	110 kg
Cadet World Championships
Bronze medal – third place	2018 Zagreb	110 kg
Representing North Ossetia–Alania
Russian Wrestling Championships
Gold medal – first place	2021 Buryatia	125 kg
Bronze medal – third place	2021 Tuva	97 kg

Sergey Vadimovich Kozyrev (Russian: Сергей Вадимович Козырев; born 18 September 2002) is a Russian freestyle wrestler who competes at 125 kilograms. He broke into the senior level scene in 2021, when he claimed the Russian National Championship, earned silver at the European Continental Championships and qualified to compete at the 2020 Summer Olympics by winning the World Olympic Qualification Tournament. In the age–group, he became the 2018 Youth Olympic champion at 110 kilograms.

== Career ==
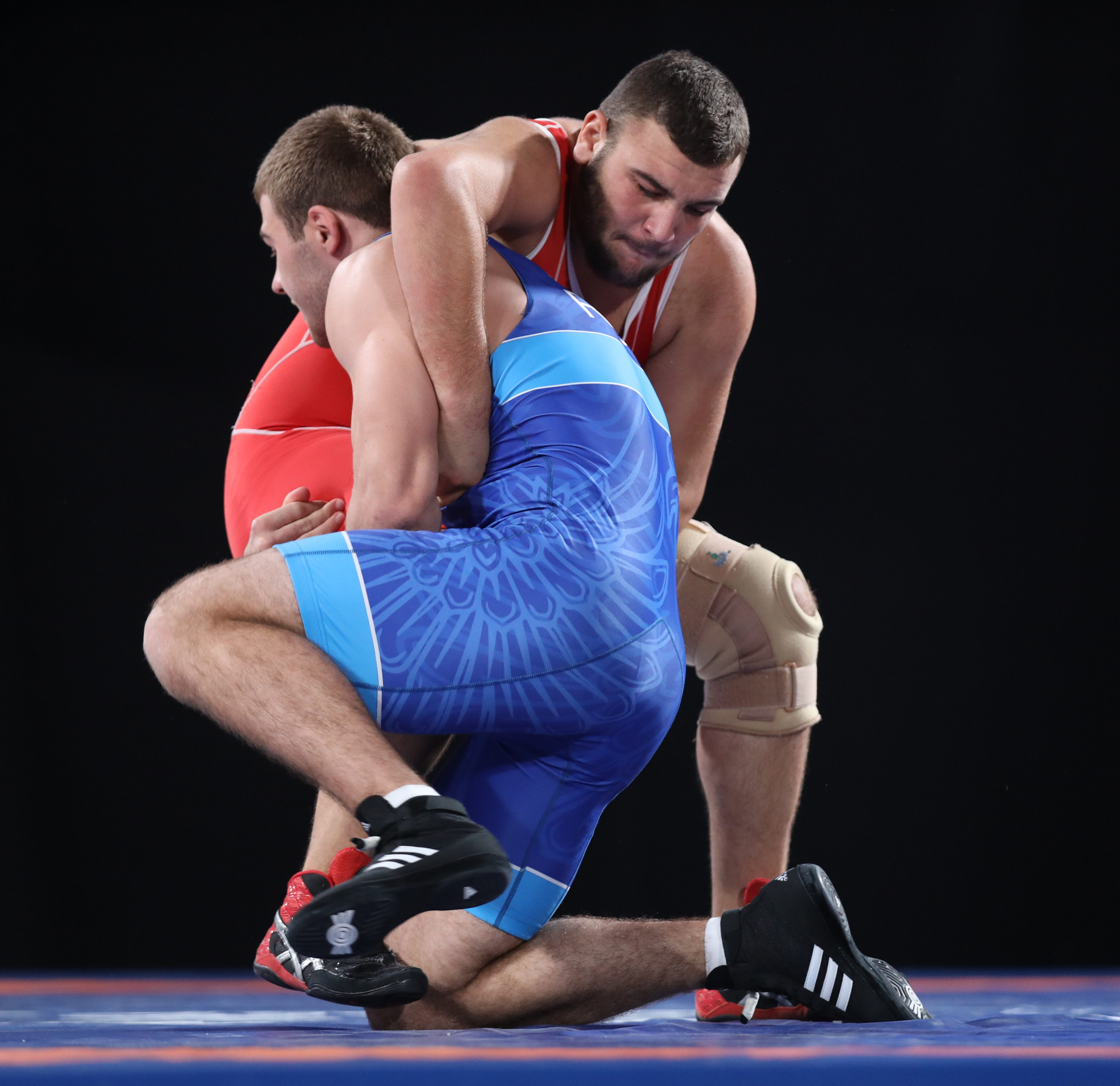
Kozyrev (in the blue singlet) at the 2018 Summer Youth Olympics.

In 2018, Kozyrev claimed the Cadet European Championship, placed third at the Cadet World Championships and most notably claimed the Youth Olympic championship when he defeated Iranian phenom and reigning Cadet World Champion Amir Hossein Zare in the finale. He made his international senior level debut by placing eleventh at the Golden Grand Prix Ivan Yarygin 2020, and later in the year went on to place tenth at the 2020 Russian National Championships at 97 kilograms. The following year, he burst into the scene by claiming the 2021 Russian National Championship, upsetting two–time National champion and '19 European Games gold medalist from Chechnya Anzor Khizriev in the semifinals and beating Atsamaz Tebloev in the finale. Next, he competed at the 2021 European Championships, where after wins over Oleksandr Khotsianivskyi and Dániel Ligeti, he went on to lose to three–time Olympic and World Champion from Turkey Taha Akgül, who claimed his tenth European Continental Championship, claiming silver.

Kozyrev competed at the 2021 World Olympic Qualification Tournament, and after consecutive wins over '20 Bulgarian National runner–up Georgi Ivanov, '20 Individual World Cup runner–up Robert Baran and two–time European Championship medalist Dániel Ligeti, he was able to cruise to the finals, thus qualifying for the 2020 Summer Olympics. He won his match against '18 Commonwealth Games gold medalist from India Sumit Malik by walkover on May 7. Malik then tested positive for doping and was disqualified.

On 5 August, Kozyrev competed as an independent athlete due to Russia's ban from the Olympic Games, on the first date of the men's freestyle 125 kg event of the 2020 Summer Olympics. In the first match, he was downed by two-time World medalist Deng Zhiwei from China, who lost his next match, being eliminated from the Games and placing eleventh.

== Major results ==
Year	Tournament	Venue	Result	Event
2021	European Championships	Warsaw, Poland	2nd	Freestyle 125 kg
2021	World Olympic Qualification Tournament	Sofia, Bulgaria	1st	Freestyle 125 kg

== Freestyle record ==
Senior Freestyle Matches
Res.	Record	Opponent	Score	Date	Event	Location
Win	15–5	(Mongolia) Mönkhtöriin Lkhagvagerel	9–3 Fall	December 3, 2021	2021 Alrosa Cup	Moscow, Russia
2020 Summer Olympics 11th at 125 kg
Loss	14–5	(China) Deng Zhiwei	1–4	August 5, 2021	2020 Summer Olympics	Tokyo, Japan
2021 World Olympic Qualification Tournament (gold) at 125 kg
Win	14–4	(India) Sumit Malik	WO	May 6–7, 2021	2021 World Olympic Qualification Tournament	Sofia, Bulgaria
Win	13–4	(Hungary) Dániel Ligeti	3–2	May 6–7, 2021	2021 World Olympic Qualification Tournament	Sofia, Bulgaria
Win	12–4	(Poland) Robert Baran	7–1	May 6–7, 2021	2021 World Olympic Qualification Tournament	Sofia, Bulgaria
Win	11–4	(Bulgaria) Georgi Ivanov	TF 12–2	May 6–7, 2021	2021 World Olympic Qualification Tournament	Sofia, Bulgaria
2021 European Championships (silver) at 125 kg
Loss	10–4	(Turkey) Taha Akgül	DQ (2–9)	April 20–21, 2021	2021 European Continental Championships	Warsaw, Poland
Win	10–3	(Hungary) Dániel Ligeti	TF 10–0	April 20–21, 2021	2021 European Continental Championships	Warsaw, Poland
Win	9–3	(Ukraine) Oleksandr Khotsianivskyi	9–7	April 20–21, 2021	2021 European Continental Championships	Warsaw, Poland
2021 Russian Nationals (gold) at 125 kg
Win	8–3	(North Ossetia–Alania) Azamat Tebloev	3–3	March 11–14, 2021	2021 Russian National Championships	Ulan-Ude, Russia
Win	7–3	(Russia) Zelimkhan Khizriev	5–1	March 11–14, 2021	2021 Russian National Championships	Ulan-Ude, Russia
Win	6–3	(Chechnya) Anzor Khizriev	2–2	March 11–14, 2021	2021 Russian National Championships	Ulan-Ude, Russia
Win	5–3	(Russia) Khasan Khubaev	8–5	March 11–14, 2021	2021 Russian National Championships	Ulan-Ude, Russia
Win	4–3	(Russia) Erik Dzhioev	2–1	March 11–14, 2021	2021 Russian National Championships	Ulan-Ude, Russia
2020 Russian Nationals 10th at 97 kg
Loss	3–3	(Russia) Rasul Magomedov	3–5	October 16–18, 2020	2020 Russian National Championships	Naro-Fominsk, Russia
2020 Ivan Yarygin Golden Grand Prix 11th at 125 kg
Loss	3–2	(Russia) Said Gamidov	6–13	January 23–26, 2020	Golden Grand Prix Ivan Yarygin 2020	Krasnoyarsk, Russia
2019 U23 All–Russian Yuri Gusov Memorial (silver) at 97 kg
Loss	3–1	(Dagestan) Magomedkhan Magomedov	5–10	September 27–28, 2019	2019 U23 All–Russian Yuri Gusov Memorial	Vladikavkaz, Russia
Win	3–0	(North Ossetia–Alania) David Dzugaev	7–5	September 27–28, 2019	2019 U23 All–Russian Yuri Gusov Memorial	Vladikavkaz, Russia
Win	2–0	(Chechnya) Askhab Boltukaev	TF 10–0	September 27–28, 2019	2019 U23 All–Russian Yuri Gusov Memorial	Vladikavkaz, Russia
Win	1–0	(Dagestan) Magomed Tagirov	TF 12–1	September 27–28, 2019	2019 U23 All–Russian Yuri Gusov Memorial	Vladikavkaz, Russia
