= Russian National Freestyle 2016 – Men's freestyle 97 kg =

Freestyle wrestling event

The men's freestyle 97 kg is a competition featured at the 2016 Russian National Freestyle Wrestling Championships, and was held in Yakutsk, Russia on May 29.

== Medalists ==
Gold	(Chechnya) Anzor Boltukaev
Silver	(North Ossetia–Alania) Khadzhimurat Gatsalov
Bronze	(Moscow) Yevgeny Kolomiets
Bronze	(North Ossetia–Alania) Vladislav Baytsaev

== Results ==
Legend

- F — Won by fall
- WO — Won by walkover

=== Finals ===
Final
(Chechnya) Anzor Boltukaev	10
(North Ossetia–Alania) Khadzhimurat Gatsalov	0

=== Top half ===
Round of 32

Round of 16
(Krasnodar Krai) Azret Shogenov	3
(Chechnya) Tamerlan Rasuev	0
(Chechnya) Akhmed Bataev	10
(Krasnoyarsk Krai) Ramazi Kharebashvili	0
(Chechnya) Anzor Boltukaev	WO
(North Ossetia–Alania) Marat Khaev
(Moscow) Yevgeny Kolomiets	WO
(Saint Petersburg) Stanislav Gadzhiev

Quarterfinals
(Krasnodar Krai) Azret Shogenov	2
(Chechnya) Akhmed Bataev	2
(Chechnya) Anzor Boltukaev	11
(Moscow) Yevgeny Kolomiets	0

Semifinals
(Chechnya) Akhmed Bataev	0
(Chechnya) Anzor Boltukaev	3

=== Bottom half ===
Round of 32
(Moscow Oblast) Magomedrasul Magomedov	0
(North Ossetia–Alania) Vladislav Baitcaev	10
(North Ossetia–Alania) Guram Chertkoev	6
(Saint Petersburg) Tembulat Kambolov	4
(Khabarovsk Krai) Valentin Gruzdev	8^{F}
(Khanty-Mansi Autonomous Okrug) Murad Tazhudinov	0
(Voronezh Oblast) Yevgeny Kinishov	0
(North Ossetia–Alania) Khadzhimurat Gatsalov	11
(Saint Petersburg) Yusup Malachmagomedov	6
(Krasnoyarsk Krai) Igor Ovsyannikov	8

Round of 16
(Kabardino-Balkaria) Astemir Nakov	1
(Chechnya) Adlan Ibragimov	7
(Krasnoyarsk Krai) Yuri Belonovskiy	4
(North Ossetia–Alania) Vladislav Baitcaev	5
(North Ossetia–Alania) Guram Chertkoev	10
(Khabarovsk Krai) Valentin Gruzdev	0
(North Ossetia–Alania) Khadzhimurat Gatsalov	5
(Krasnoyarsk Krai) Igor Ovsyannikov	0

Quarterfinals
(Chechnya) Adlan Ibragimov	0
(North Ossetia–Alania) Vladislav Baitcaev	2^{F}
(North Ossetia–Alania) Guram Chertkoev	0
(North Ossetia–Alania) Khadzhimurat Gatsalov	6

Semifinals
(North Ossetia–Alania) Vladislav Baitcaev	3
(North Ossetia–Alania) Khadzhimurat Gatsalov	7

=== Repechage ===
Repechage round 1
(Voronezh Oblast) Yevgeny Kinishov	1
(Krasnoyarsk Krai) Igor Ovsyannikov	6

Repechage round 2
(Moscow) Yevgeny Kolomiets	WO
(North Ossetia–Alania) Marat Khaev
(Krasnoyarsk Krai) Igor Ovsyannikov	6
(North Ossetia–Alania) Guram Chertkoev	2

Bronze medals
(Moscow) Yevgeny Kolomiets	9
(Chechnya) Akhmed Bataev	4
(Krasnoyarsk Krai) Igor Ovsyannikov	0
(North Ossetia–Alania) Vladislav Baitcaev	10
