= Hakan Büyükçıngıl =

Turkish freestyle wrestler (born 2004)

Personal information
- Nationality: Turkish
- Weight: 125 kg (276 lb)

Sport
- Sport: Wrestling
- Event: Freestyle
- Club: Ankara ASKI Sports Club
Medal record
Men's freestyle wrestling
Representing Turkey
European Championships
Bronze medal – third place	2026 Tirana	125 kg
Islamic Solidarity Games
Bronze medal – third place	2025 Riyadh	125 kg
Mediterranean Games
Gold medal – first place	2026 Taranto	125 kg
World U23 Championships
Bronze medal – third place	2025 Novi Sad	125 kg
European U23 Championships
Bronze medal – third place	2026 Zrenjanin	125 kg
World U20 Championships
Bronze medal – third place	2023 Amman	125 kg
Bronze medal – third place	2024 Pontevedra	125 kg
European U20 Championships
Gold medal – first place	2023 Santiago	125 kg
Silver medal – second place	2024 Novi Sad	125 kg
European U17 Championships
Bronze medal – third place	2021 Samokov	110 kg

Hakan Büyükçıngıl is a Turkish freestyle wrestler who competes in the 125 kg division. He represents Ankara ASKİ Sports Club and is part of the Turkey national team.

== Career ==
In 2021, Büyükçıngıl won a bronze medal in the freestyle 110 kg category at the European Cadet Wrestling Championships held in Samokov, Bulgaria.

He was the Turkish national champion after defeating Adil Mısırcı in the final at the 2025 Turkish Wrestling Championships held at Taha Akgül Sports Hall in Ankara.
