= Manjot Sandhu =

Canadian wrestler (born 1990)

Personal information
- Nationality: Canadian
- Born: 19 August 1990 (age 35)
- Height: 1.93 m (6 ft 4 in)
- Weight: 96 kg (212 lb)

Sport
- Sport: Freestyle wrestling
Medal record
Representing Canada

Manjot Sandhu (born August 19, 1990) is a Canadian wrestler. He finished in 18th place in the 96kg event at the 2013 World Wrestling Championships. He won a bronze medal in the 84 kg freestyle at the Commonwealth Wrestling Championship in Jalandhar 2009.
