= Wrestling at the 2022 Mediterranean Games – Men's freestyle 125 kg =

Wrestling competitions

Men's Freestyle 125 kg at the 2022 Mediterranean Games
- Venue: EMEC Hall
- Date: 27–28 June
- Competitors: 9 from 9 nations

Medalists
gold medal	Magomedgadzhi Nurasulov	Serbia
silver medal	Abraham Conyedo	Italy
bronze medal	Salim Ercan	Turkey
bronze medal	Youssif Hemida	Egypt

The men's freestyle 125 kg competition of the wrestling events at the 2022 Mediterranean Games in Oran, Algeria, was held from 27 June to 28 June at the EMEC Hall.

== Results ==
Legend

- F — Won by fall

Round of 16
Alexios Kaouslidis (CYP)	4
Omar Sarem (SYR)	0

Quarterfinals
Salim Ercan (TUR)	10
Egzon Shala (KOS)	0
Muhammed Bilal Khalil (ALG)	0
Magomedgadzhi Nurasulov (SRB)	10
Abraham Conyedo (ITA)	12
Konstantinos Alexandridis (GRE)	1
Youssif Hemida (EGY)	11
Alexios Kaouslidis (CYP)	0

Semifinals
Salim Ercan (TUR)	2
Magomedgadzhi Nurasulov (SRB)	10
Abraham Conyedo (ITA)	6
Youssif Hemida (EGY)	0

Final
Magomedgadzhi Nurasulov (SRB)	8
Abraham Conyedo (ITA)	1

Bronze medals
Muhammed Bilal Khalil (ALG)	0
Salim Ercan (TUR)	10
Konstantinos Alexandridis (GRE)	0
Youssif Hemida (EGY)	12
