= Russian National Freestyle 2017 – Men's freestyle 97 kg =

Russian wrestling competition

The men's freestyle 97 kg is a competition featured at the 2017 Russian National Freestyle Wrestling Championships, and was held in Nazran, Ingushetia, Russia on June 14.

== Medalists ==
Gold	(Dagestan) Abdulrashid Sadulaev
Silver	(North Ossetia–Alania) Vladislav Baitcaev
Bronze	(Krasnoyarsk Krai) Yuri Belonovskiy
Bronze	(Dagestan) Rasul Magomedov

== Results ==
Legend

- F — Won by fall
- WO — Won by walkover (bye)

=== Finals ===
Final
(North Ossetia–Alania) Vladislav Baitcaev	7
(Dagestan) Abdulrashid Sadulaev	8

- Semifinals: Abdulrashid Sadulaev def. Tamerla Rasuev by tech. superiority. (12–0)

=== Top half ===
==== Section 1 ====
Round of 32
(Dagestan) Rasul Magomedov	10
(Dagestan) Gasan Shamkhalov	0
(Dagestan) Magomedkhan Magomedov	10
(Orenburg Oblast) Arman Igityan	0
(Dagestan) Zaynullah Kurbanov	4
(North Ossetia–Alania) Georgy Gogaev	4
(Krasnodar Krai) Alan Gubzhev	1
(Moscow Oblast) Evgeny Kolomiets	12
(Dagestan) Tadzhudin Mukhtarov	10
(Krasnodar Krai) Azret Shogenov	0
(Leningrad Oblast) Shamsudin Bulataliev	0
(North Ossetia–Alania) Vladislav Baitcaev	10
(Republic of Crimea (Russia)) Guram Chertkoev	9
(Krasnoyarsk Krai) Igor Ovsyannikov	7
(North Ossetia–Alania) Batraz Gazzaev	12
(Leningrad Oblast) Shamil Ibragimov	2

Round of 16
(Dagestan) Rasul Magomedov	4
(Dagestan) Magomedkhan Magomedov	2
(North Ossetia–Alania) Georgy Gogaev	12
(Moscow Oblast) Evgeny Kolomiets	10
(Dagestan) Tadzhudin Mukhtarov	0
(North Ossetia–Alania) Vladislav Baitcaev	10
(Republic of Crimea (Russia)) Guram Chertkoev	0
(North Ossetia–Alania) Batraz Gazzaev	10

Quarterfinals
(Dagestan) Rasul Magomedov	5
(North Ossetia–Alania) Georgy Gogaev	1
(North Ossetia–Alania) Vladislav Baitcaev	2
(North Ossetia–Alania) Batraz Gazzaev	0

Semifinals
(Dagestan) Rasul Magomedov	1
(North Ossetia–Alania) Vladislav Baitcaev	3

=== Bottom half ===
==== Section 1 ====
Round of 64

Round of 32
(Tatarstan) Adam Abdulvakhabov	4
(Moscow Oblast) David Margiev	1
(Moscow Oblast) Magomed Murtazaliev	2
(Leningrad Oblast) Stanislav Gadzhiev	6
(Dagestan) Abdulrashid Sadulaev	10
(Krasnoyarsk Krai) Yuri Belonovskiy	0
(North Ossetia–Alania) Khasan Khubaev	3
(Dagestan) Umar Kudliev	3

Round of 16
(Tatarstan) Adam Abdulvakhabov	1
(Leningrad Oblast) Stanislav Gadzhiev	1
(Dagestan) Abdulrashid Sadulaev	12
(Dagestan) Umar Kudliev	0

Quarterfinals
(Leningrad Oblast) Stanislav Gadzhiev	0
(Dagestan) Abdulrashid Sadulaev	10

==== Section 2 ====
Round of 64
(Krasnoyarsk Krai) Erik Dzhioev	0
(Chechnya) Adam-Khadzhi Beterbiev	10
(Orenburg Oblast) Nikita Strokin	0
(Chechnya) Tamerlan Rasuev	10
(Sakhalin Oblast) Badavi Magomedov	0
(Republic of Crimea (Russia)) Georgy Dzhukaev	10

Round of 34
(Moscow Oblast) Magomedsu Magomedov
(Moscow Oblast) Aslanbek Gazzaev	^{WO}
(Chechnya) Akhmed Bataev	6
(North Ossetia–Alania) Inal Tasoev	0
(North Ossetia–Alania) David Dzugaev	14
(Chechnya) Adam-Khadzhi Beterbiev	10
(Chechnya) Tamerlan Rasuev	8^{F}
(Republic of Crimea (Russia)) Georgy Dzhukaev	2

Round of 16
(Moscow Oblast) Aslanbek Gazzaev	3
(Chechnya) Akhmed Bataev	10
(North Ossetia–Alania) David Dzugaev	2
(Chechnya) Tamerlan Rasuev	14

Quarterfinals
(Chechnya) Akhmed Bataev	2
(Chechnya) Tamerlan Rasuev	2

=== Repechage ===
Repechage round 1
(Krasnoyarsk Krai) Yuri Belonovskiy	4
(Dagestan) Umar Kudliev	0
(Leningrad Oblast) Shamsudin Bulataliev	9
(Dagestan) Tadzhudin Mukhtarov	6

Repechage round 2
(Krasnoyarsk Krai) Yuri Belonovskiy	5
(Leningrad Oblast) Stanislav Gadzhiev	0
(Leningrad Oblast) Shamsudin Bulataliev	2
(North Ossetia–Alania) Batraz Gazzaev	9^{F}

Bronze medals
(Krasnoyarsk Krai) Yuri Belonovskiy	4
(Chechnya) Tamerlan Rasuev	3
(North Ossetia–Alania) Batraz Gazzaev	1
(Dagestan) Rasul Magomedov	2
