= 2026 European Wrestling Championships – Men's freestyle 125 kg =

Wrestling competition

Men's freestyle 125 kg at the 2026 European Wrestling Championships
- Venue: Tirana Olympic Park
- Location: Tirana, Albania
- Dates: 25-26 April
- Competitors: 15

Medalists
gold medal	Giorgi Meshvildishvili	Azerbaijan
silver medal	Vladislav Baitcaev	Hungary
bronze medal	Hakan Büyükçıngıl	Turkey
bronze medal	Mohsen Siyar	Germany

The men's freestyle 125 kg is a competition featured at the 2026 European Wrestling Championships, and was held in Tirana, Albania on April 25 and 26.

== Results ==
Legend

- F — Won by fall
- R — Retired

=== Main bracket ===
Round of 16
Khachatur Khachatryan (ARM)	6^{F}
Kamil Kościółek (POL)	1
Volodymyr Kochanov (UKR)	0
Hakan Büyükçıngıl (TUR)	10^{F}
Shamil Musaev (UWW)	8
Solomon Manashvili (GEO)	3
Mohsen Siyar (GER)	4
Omar Sarem (ROU)	0
Johannes Ludescher (AUT)	5
Alen Khubulov (BUL)	0^{R}
Gheorghe Erhan (MDA)	2
Magomedgadji Nurov (MKD)	2
Azamat Khosonov (GRE)	0
Vladislav Baitcaev (HUN)	2

Quarterfinals
Giorgi Meshvildishvili (AZE)	5
Khachatur Khachatryan (ARM)	5
Hakan Büyükçıngıl (TUR)	6
Shamil Musaev (UWW)	5
Mohsen Siyar (GER)	4
Johannes Ludescher (AUT)	0
Magomedgadji Nurov (MKD)	2
Vladislav Baitcaev (HUN)	4^{F}

Semifinals
Giorgi Meshvildishvili (AZE)	3
Hakan Büyükçıngıl (TUR)	1
Mohsen Siyar (GER)	3
Vladislav Baitcaev (HUN)	4

Final
Giorgi Meshvildishvili (AZE)	8
Vladislav Baitcaev (HUN)	0

=== Repechage ===
Repechage round 1
Azamat Khosonov (GRE)	2
Magomedgadji Nurov (MKD)	1

Bronze medal matches
Khachatur Khachatryan (ARM)	2
Hakan Büyükçıngıl (TUR)	6
Azamat Khosonov (GRE)	1
Mohsen Siyar (GER)	2

== Final standing ==
Rank	Athlete
1st place, gold medalist(s)	Giorgi Meshvildishvili (AZE)
2nd place, silver medalist(s)	Vladislav Baitcaev (HUN)
3rd place, bronze medalist(s)	Hakan Büyükçıngıl (TUR)
3rd place, bronze medalist(s)	Mohsen Siyar (GER)
5	Khachatur Khachatryan (ARM)
5	Azamat Khosonov (GRE)
7	Johannes Ludescher (AUT)
8	Shamil Musaev (UWW)
9	Magomedgadji Nurov (MKD)
10	Solomon Manashvili (GEO)
11	Gheorghe Erhan (MDA)
12	Kamil Kościółek (POL)
13	Volodymyr Kochanov (UKR)
14	Omar Sarem (ROU)
15	Alen Khubulov (BUL)
