= 2021 European Wrestling Championships – Men's freestyle 125 kg =

Wrestling competition

The men's freestyle 125 kg is a competition featured at the 2021 European Wrestling Championships, and was held in Warsaw, Poland on April 20 and April 21.

== Medalists ==
Gold	Taha Akgül; Turkey
Silver	Sergey Kozyrev; Russia
Bronze	Oleksandr Khotsianivskyi; Ukraine
Bronze	Geno Petriashvili; Georgia

== Results ==
Legend

- C — Won by 3 cautions given to the opponent
- F — Won by fall

Round of 16
Islam Adizov (BUL)	0
Dzianis Khramiankou (BLR)	11
Johannes Ludescher (AUT)	1
Jere Heino (FIN)	2
Egzon Shala (KOS)	0
Kamil Kościółek (POL)	12
Taha Akgül (TUR)	6
Geno Petriashvili (GEO)	1

Quarterfinals
Oleksandr Khotsianivskyi (UKR)	7
Sergey Kozyrev (RUS)	9
Dániel Ligeti (HUN)	6
Şamhan Jabrailov (MDA)	0
Dzianis Khramiankou (BLR)	7^{F}
Jere Heino (FIN)	0
Kamil Kościółek (POL)	1
Taha Akgül (TUR)	6

Semifinals
Sergey Kozyrev (RUS)	10
Dániel Ligeti (HUN)	0
Dzianis Khramiankou (BLR)	0
Taha Akgül (TUR)	4

Final
Sergey Kozyrev (RUS)	2
Taha Akgül (TUR)	9^{C}

Repechage round 1
Geno Petriashvili (GEO)	9
Kamil Kościółek (POL)	0

Bronze medal match
Oleksandr Khotsianivskyi (UKR)	5
Dániel Ligeti (HUN)	0
Geno Petriashvili (GEO)	12
Dzianis Khramiankou (BLR)	9

== Final standing ==
Rank	Athlete
1st place, gold medalist(s)	Taha Akgül (TUR)
2nd place, silver medalist(s)	Sergey Kozyrev (RUS)
3rd place, bronze medalist(s)	Oleksandr Khotsianivskyi (UKR)
3rd place, bronze medalist(s)	Geno Petriashvili (GEO)
5	Dániel Ligeti (HUN)
5	Dzianis Khramiankou (BLR)
7	Kamil Kościółek (POL)
8	Jere Heino (FIN)
9	Johannes Ludescher (AUT)
10	Şamhan Jabrailov (MDA)
11	Islam Adizov (BUL)
12	Egzon Shala (KOS)
