= 2016 European Wrestling Championships – Men's freestyle 97 kg =

The men's freestyle 97 kg is a competition featured at the 2016 European Wrestling Championships, and was held in Riga, Latvia on March 9.

== Medalists ==
Gold	Anzor Boltukaev; Russia
Silver	Ivan Yankouski; Belarus
Bronze	Erik Thiele; Germany
Bronze	Elizbar Odikadze; Georgia

== Results ==
Legend

- R — Retired
- F — Won by fall

=== Final ===
Final
Anzor Boltukaev (RUS)	11
Ivan Yankouski (BLR)	0

=== Top half ===
Round of 32

Round of 16
Magomedgadzhi Nurov (MKD)	4
Erik Thiele (GER)	6
Egzon Shala (ALB)	2
Nicolai Ceban (MDA)	14
Micheil Tsikovani (GRE)	9
Christian Valenzuela (ESP)	1
Sharif Sharifov (AZE)	0^{R}
Ivan Yankouski (BLR)	0

Quarterfinals
Erik Thiele (GER)	5
Nicolai Ceban (MDA)	1
Micheil Tsikovani (GRE)	0
Ivan Yankouski (BLR)	9

Semifinals
Erik Thiele (GER)	2
Ivan Yankouski (BLR)	3

=== Bottom half ===
Round of 32
Michael Manea (ROM)	0
Valeriy Andriytsev (UKR)	6
Anzor Boltukaev (RUS)	11
Imants Lagodskis (LAT)	0
Dragomir Stoychev (BUL)	0
Radosław Baran (POL)	11
Edon Shala (KOS)	3
Jozef Jaloviar (SVK)	13
Philipp Hutter (SUI)	0
Elizbar Odikadze (GEO)	10

Round of 16
Fatih Yaşarlı (TUR)	10
Andranik Galstyan (ARM)	4
Ragnar Kaasik (EST)	0
Valeriy Andriytsev (UKR)	10
Anzor Boltukaev (RUS)	11
Radosław Baran (POL)	0
Jozef Jaloviar (SVK)	0
Elizbar Odikadze (GEO)	11

Quarterfinals
Fatih Yaşarlı (TUR)	0
Valeriy Andriytsev (UKR)	10
Anzor Boltukaev (RUS)	12
Elizbar Odikadze (GEO)	0

Semifinals
Anzor Boltukaev (RUS)	8
Valeriy Andriytsev (UKR)	5

=== Repechage ===
Repechage round 1
Imants Lagodskis (LAT)	1
Radosław Baran (POL)	12

Repechage round 2
Sharif Sharifov (AZE)	0^{R}
Micheil Tsikovani (GRE)	0
Radosław Baran (POL)	1
Elizbar Odikadze (GEO)	5

Bronze medals
Erik Thiele (GER)	5
Micheil Tsikovani (GRE)	1
Elizbar Odikadze (GEO)	3
Valeriy Andriytsev (UKR)	1
