= 2025 U23 World Wrestling Championships – Men's freestyle 125 kg =

Wrestling competitions

Men's freestyle 125 kg at the 2025 U23 World Championships
- Venue: SPC Vojvodina
- Dates: 25–26 October
- Competitors: 19 from 17 nations

Medalists
gold medal	Abolfazl Mohammadnejad	Iran
silver medal	Khetag Karsanov	Azerbaijan
bronze medal	Khabib Davudgadzhiev
bronze medal	Hakan Büyükçıngıl	Turkey

The men's freestyle 125 kilograms is a competition featured at the 2025 U23 World Wrestling Championships, and was held in Novi Sad, Serbia on 25 and 26 October 2025.

This freestyle wrestling competition consists of a single-elimination tournament, with a repechage used to determine the winner of two bronze medals. The two finalists face off for gold and silver medals. Each wrestler who loses to one of the two finalists moves into the repechage, culminating in a pair of bronze medal matches featuring the semifinal losers each facing the remaining repechage opponent from their half of the bracket.

== Results ==
Legend

- F — Won by fall
- R — Retired

=== Final ===
Final
Abolfazl Mohammadnejad (IRI)	11
Khetag Karsanov (AZE)	0

=== Top half ===
Round of 32
Alessandro Scaramella (ITA)	0
Dmitrii Dușcov (MDA)	11

Round of 16
Khachatur Khachatryan (ARM)	6
Namoz Abdurashidov (UZB)	0
Dmitrii Dușcov (MDA)	2
Abolfazl Mohammadnejad (IRI)	12
Jorawar Dhinsa (CAN)	1
Khabib Davudgadzhiev (UWW)	5
Zhuang Yiwei (CHN)	0
Volodymyr Kochanov (UKR)	8^{F}

Quarterfinals
Khachatur Khachatryan (ARM)	0
Abolfazl Mohammadnejad (IRI)	8
Khabib Davudgadzhiev (UWW)	12
Volodymyr Kochanov (UKR)	1

Semifinals
Abolfazl Mohammadnejad (IRI)	5
Khabib Davudgadzhiev (UWW)	0

=== Bottom half ===
Round of 32
Bauyrzhan Sovetov (KAZ)	0
Batbayaryn Nambardagva (MGL)	3
Pavel Dziatlau (UWW)	2
Khetag Karsanov (AZE)	12

Round of 16
Ryusei Fujita (JPN)	2
Daniel Herrera (USA)	10
Batbayaryn Nambardagva (MGL)	11
Konstantine Petriashvili (GEO)	8
Abdelrahman Sheyatan (EGY)	0
Khetag Karsanov (AZE)	11
Georgi Ivanov (BUL)	4
Hakan Büyükçıngıl (TUR)	7

Quarterfinals
Daniel Herrera (USA)	6^{F}
Batbayaryn Nambardagvar (MGL)	5
Khetag Karsanov (AZE)	7
Hakan Büyükçıngıl (TUR)	5

Semifinals
Daniel Herrera (USA)	2
Khetag Karsanov (AZE)	12

=== Repechage ===
Repechage round 1
Pavel Dziatlau (UWW)	5^{R}
Abdelrahman Sheyatan (EGY)	5

Repechage round 2
Dmitrii Dușcov (MDA)	0
Khachatur Khachatryan (ARM)	10
Abdelrahman Sheyatan (EGY)	7
Hakan Büyükçıngıl (TUR)	13

Bronze medals
Khachatur Khachatryan (ARM)	5
Khabib Davudgadzhiev (UWW)	9
Hakan Büyükçıngıl (TUR)	14
Daniel Herrera (USA)	3

== Final standing ==
Rank	Athlete
1st place, gold medalist(s)	Abolfazl Mohammadnejad (IRI)
2nd place, silver medalist(s)	Khetag Karsanov (AZE)
3rd place, bronze medalist(s)	Khabib Davudgadzhiev (UWW)
3rd place, bronze medalist(s)	Hakan Büyükçıngıl (TUR)
5	Khachatur Khachatryan (ARM)
5	Daniel Herrera (USA)
7	Volodymyr Kochanov (UKR)
8	Batbayaryn Nambardagva (MGL)
9	Abdelrahman Sheyatan (EGY)
10	Dmitrii Dușcov (MDA)
11	Konstantine Petriashvili (GEO)
12	Pavel Dziatlau (UWW)
13	Georgi Ivanov (BUL)
14	Ryusei Fujita (JPN)
15	Jorawar Dhinsa (CAN)
16	Bauyrzhan Sovetov (KAZ)
17	Namoz Abdurashidov (UZB)
18	Zhuang Yiwei (CHN)
19	Alessandro Scaramella (ITA)
