= Abraham Conyedo =

Italian freestyle wrestler

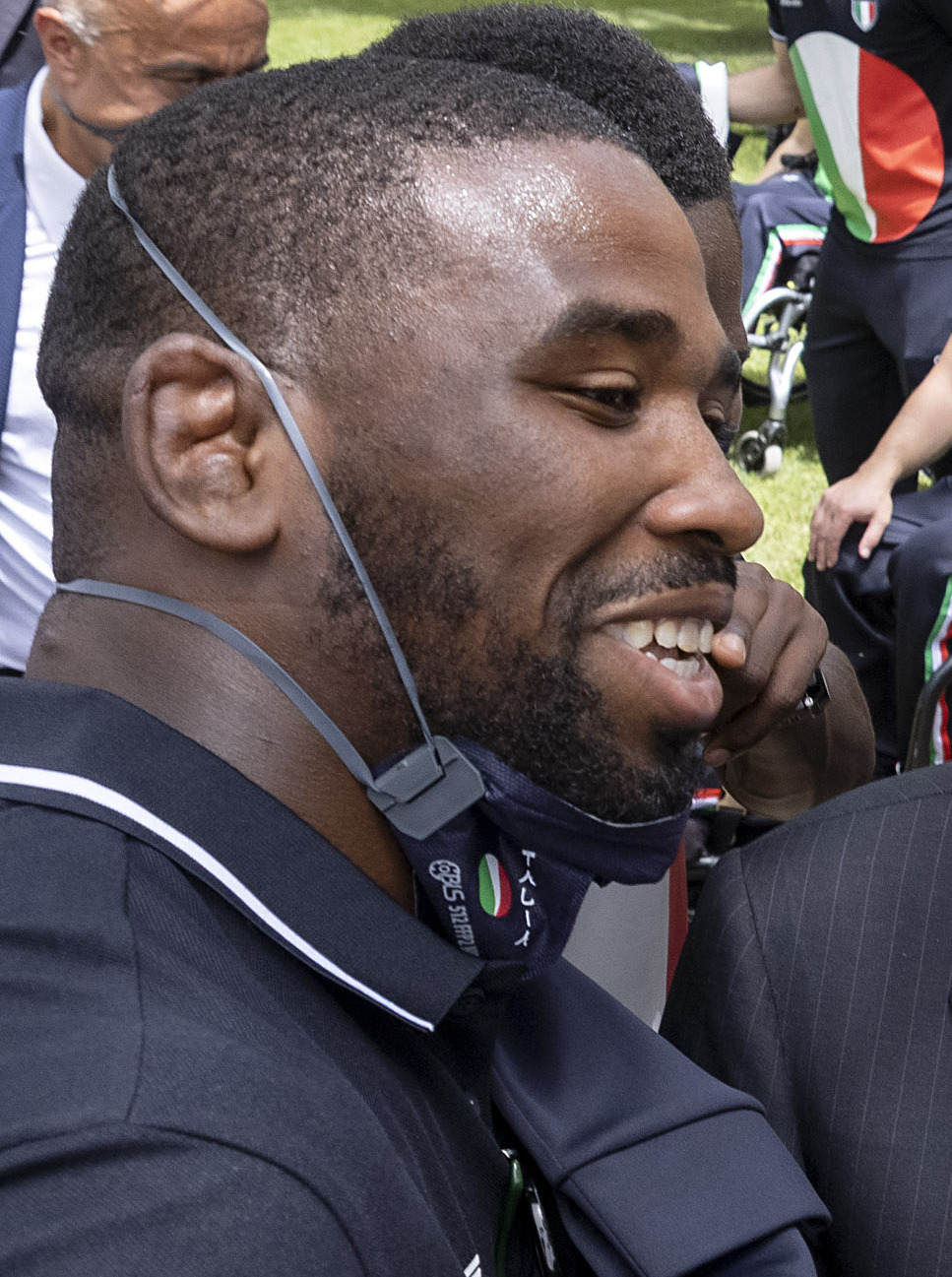
- Conyedo in 2021

Personal information
- Full name: Abraham de Jesús Conyedo Ruano
- Nickname: Abramo
- Nationality: Cuban-Italian
- Born: 7 October 1993 (age 33) Santa Clara, Cuba
- Height: 1.80 m (5 ft 11 in)
- Life partner: Tiziana Corona

Sport
- Country: Italy
- Sport: Amateur wrestling
- Weight class: 97 kg; 125 kg
- Event: Freestyle
Medal record
Men's freestyle wrestling
Representing Italy
Olympic Games
Bronze medal – third place	2020 Tokyo	97 kg
World Championships
Bronze medal – third place	2018 Budapest	97 kg
European Championships
Bronze medal – third place	2020 Rome	97 kg
Mediterranean Games
Silver medal – second place	2022 Oran	125 kg
World Military Championships
Bronze medal – third place	2025 Warendorf	125 kg
Grand Prix
Gold medal – first place	2022 Tirana	125 kg
Representing Cuba
Pan American Championships
Silver medal – second place	2015 Santiago	97 kg
Youth Olympic Games
Silver medal – second place	2010 Singapore	100 kg

Abraham de Jesús "Abramo" Conyedo Ruano (born 7 October 1993) is a Cuban-born freestyle wrestler representing Italy. He represented Italy at the 2020 Summer Olympics in Tokyo, Japan, winning a bronze medal in the men's freestyle 97 kg event. He is also a bronze medalist at the World Wrestling Championships and the European Wrestling Championships.

== Career ==
In 2018, Conyedo won one of the bronze medals in the men's 97 kg event at the World Wrestling Championships held in Budapest, Hungary. In 2020, he won one of the bronze medals in the 97 kg event at the European Wrestling Championships held in Rome, Italy.

In March 2021, Conyedo competed at the European Qualification Tournament in Budapest, Hungary, qualifying for the 2020 Summer Olympics in Tokyo, Japan. A month later, he competed in the 97 kg event at the 2021 European Wrestling Championships in Warsaw, Poland where he was eliminated in his first match.

In 2022, Conyedo lost his bronze medal match in the 125 kg event at the European Wrestling Championships held in Budapest, Hungary. He won the silver medal in the 125 kg event at the 2022 Mediterranean Games held in Oran, Algeria.

Conyedo competed at the 2024 European Wrestling Olympic Qualification Tournament in Baku, Azerbaijan hoping to qualify for the 2024 Summer Olympics in Paris, France. He was eliminated in his second match and he did not qualify for the Olympics. Conyedo also competed at the 2024 World Wrestling Olympic Qualification Tournament held in Istanbul, Turkey without qualifying for the Olympics.

== Achievements ==
Year	Tournament	Location	Result	Event
2018	World Championships	Budapest, Hungary	3rd	Freestyle 97 kg
2020	European Championships	Rome, Italy	3rd	Freestyle 97 kg
2021	Summer Olympics	Tokyo, Japan	3rd	Freestyle 97 kg
2022	Mediterranean Games	Oran, Algeria	2nd	Freestyle 125 kg
