= Vladislav Baitcaev =

Russian freestyle wrestler

Vladislav Baitcaev Владислав Байцаев
Personal information
- Full name: Valdislav Borisovich Baitcaev
- Nationality: Russia; Hungary
- Born: Владислав Борисович Байцаев; August 17, 1990 (age 36) Digora, Republic of North Ossetia–Alania, Soviet Union
- Height: 188 cm (6 ft 2 in)

Sport
- Country: Russia; Hungary (since 2022)
- Sport: Wrestling
- Weight class: 97 kg
- Rank: International Master of Sports.
- Event: Freestyle
- Club: CSKA WC (Moscow)
- Coached by: Cesar Tibilov, Georgy Berishvili, Anatoly Margiev

Achievements and titles
- World finals: 5th(2022)
- Regional finals: (gold) (2018)
Medal record
Men's freestyle wrestling
Representing Hungary
European Championships
| Silver medal – second place | 2022 Budapest | 97 kg |
| Silver medal – second place | 2026 Tirana | 125 kg |
| Bronze medal – third place | 2023 Zagreb | 97 kg |
| Bronze medal – third place | 2024 Bucharest | 97 kg |
Grand Prix
| Silver medal – second place | 2025 Vladikavkaz | 125 kg |
| Bronze medal – third place | 2023 Alexandria | 97 kg |
| Bronze medal – third place | 2022 Rome | 97 kg |
Representing Russia
World Cup
| Gold medal – first place | 2019 Yakutsk | 97 kg |
| Silver medal – second place | 2014 Los Angeles | 97 kg |
European Championships
| Gold medal – first place | 2018 Kaspiysk | 97 kg |
| Silver medal – second place | 2011 Dortmund | 96 kg |
| Bronze medal – third place | 2013 Tbilisi | 96 kg |
Military World Games
| Gold medal – first place | 2015 Moungyeong | 125 kg |
| Bronze medal – third place | 2019 Wuhan | 97 kg |
Military World Championships
| Gold medal – first place | 2018 Moscow | 97 kg |
Representing (North Ossetia–Alania) North Ossetia
Russian Championships
| Gold medal – first place | 2019 Sochi | 97 kg |
| Silver medal – second place | 2018 Odintsovo | 97 kg |
| Silver medal – second place | 2017 Nazran | 97 kg |
| Silver medal – second place | 2015 Kaspiysk | 97 kg |
| Bronze medal – third place | 2016 Yakutsk | 97 kg |
| Bronze medal – third place | 2014 Yakutsk | 97 kg |
Golden Grand Prix Ivan Yarygin
| Gold medal – first place | 2020 Krasnoyarsk | 97 kg |
| Gold medal – first place | 2016 Krasnoyarsk | 125 kg |
| Gold medal – first place | 2013 Krasnoyarsk | 96 kg |
| Silver medal – second place | 2011 Krasnoyarsk | 96 kg |
| Bronze medal – third place | 2018 Krasnoyarsk | 97 kg |
Grand Prix
| Gold medal – first place | 2015 Moscow | 125 kg |
| Gold medal – first place | 2017 Yakutsk | 125 kg |
| Gold medal – first place | 2019 Kaspisk | 125 kg |
| Silver medal – second place | 2016 Taraz | 125 kg |

Vladislav Borisovich Baitcaev (Russian: Владислав Борисович Байцаев; born August 17, 1990) is a Russian freestyle wrestler. European champion 2018, twice Ivan Yarygin winner, he was runner-up at the 2011 European Championships and third at the 2013 European Championships, both times in the 96 kg classification. Also, he is a bronze medalist of 2016 Russian Nationals Championships at 97 kg and runner-up at the 2017 Russian National Freestyle Wrestling Championships.

Baitcaev won his first European Championships in Kaspiysk in the 97 kg category.

He competed at the 2024 European Wrestling Olympic Qualification Tournament in Baku, Azerbaijan hoping to qualify for the 2024 Summer Olympics in Paris, France. He was eliminated in his first match and he did not qualify for the Olympics.

== Biography ==
Vladislav Baitcaev was born in the village of Digora, North Ossetia-Alania, Soviet Union. He started to train in freestyle wrestling at the age of nine, but after one month he decided to stop training. Three years later he returned to wrestling. His first coach was Alan Dzagkoev. In 2005, he moved to Vladikavkaz where he was coached by Cesar Tibilov. Baitcaev represents the CSKA wrestling club in Moscow.

== Championships and achievements ==
- 2013, 2016 2020 Ivan Yarygin GP – 1st (96 kg, 97 kg)
- 2011 Ivan Yarygin GP – 2nd (96 kg)
- 2018 Ivan Yarygin GP – 3rd (97 kg)
- 2014 World Cup – 2nd (97 kg)
- 2019 World Cup – 1st (97 kg)
- 2011, 2022 European Championships – 2nd (96 kg, 97 kg)
- 2013, 2023, 2024 European Championships – 3rd (96 kg, 97 kg)
- 2018 European Championships – 1st (97 kg)
- 2018 Military World Championships – 1st (97 kg)
- 2022 World Championships – 5th (97 kg)
