= Albert Saritov =

Russian-born Romanian wrestler

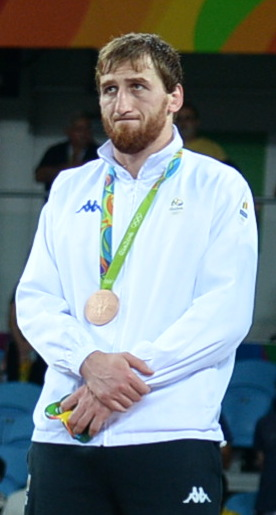
- Saritov at the 2016 Summer Olympics

Personal information
- Full name: Albert Ramazanovich Saritov
- Born: July 8, 1985 (age 41) Khasavyurt, Dagestan,Russia
- Height: 188 cm (6 ft 2 in)

Sport
- Weight class: 84–97 kg (185–214 lb)
Medal record
Men's freestyle wrestling
Representing Romania
Olympic Games
Bronze medal – third place	2016 Rio de Janeiro	97 kg
European Championships
Silver medal – second place	2020 Rome	97 kg
Representing Russia
World Championships
Bronze medal – third place	2011 Istanbul	84 kg
Ali Aliyev Memorial
Gold medal – first place	2014 Kaspiysk	84 kg
Golden Grand Prix Ivan Yarygin
Silver medal – second place	2014 Krasnoyarsk	84 kg
Ramzan Kadyrov and Adlan Varayev Cup
Gold medal – first place	2012 Grozny	84 kg

Albert Ramazanovich Saritov (Russian: Альберт Рамазанович Саритов; born July 8, 1985, in Khasavyurt) is a Russian-born naturalized Romanian freestyle wrestler of Chechen descent. 2016 Olympics bronze medalist, bronze medalist World Wrestling Championships 2011 in Istanbul, Turkey. Ramzan Kadyrov & Adlan Varayev cup 2012 winner, Golden Grand Prix Ivan Yarygin 2011 runner-up and winner Ali Aliyev Memorial 2014. He is representing Mindiashvili wrestling academy.

In March 2021, he competed at the European Qualification Tournament in Budapest, Hungary and qualified for the 2020 Summer Olympics in Tokyo, Japan.

== Personal life ==
Saritov is a Muslim.
