= Oleksandr Khotsianivskyi =

Ukrainian freestyle wrestler

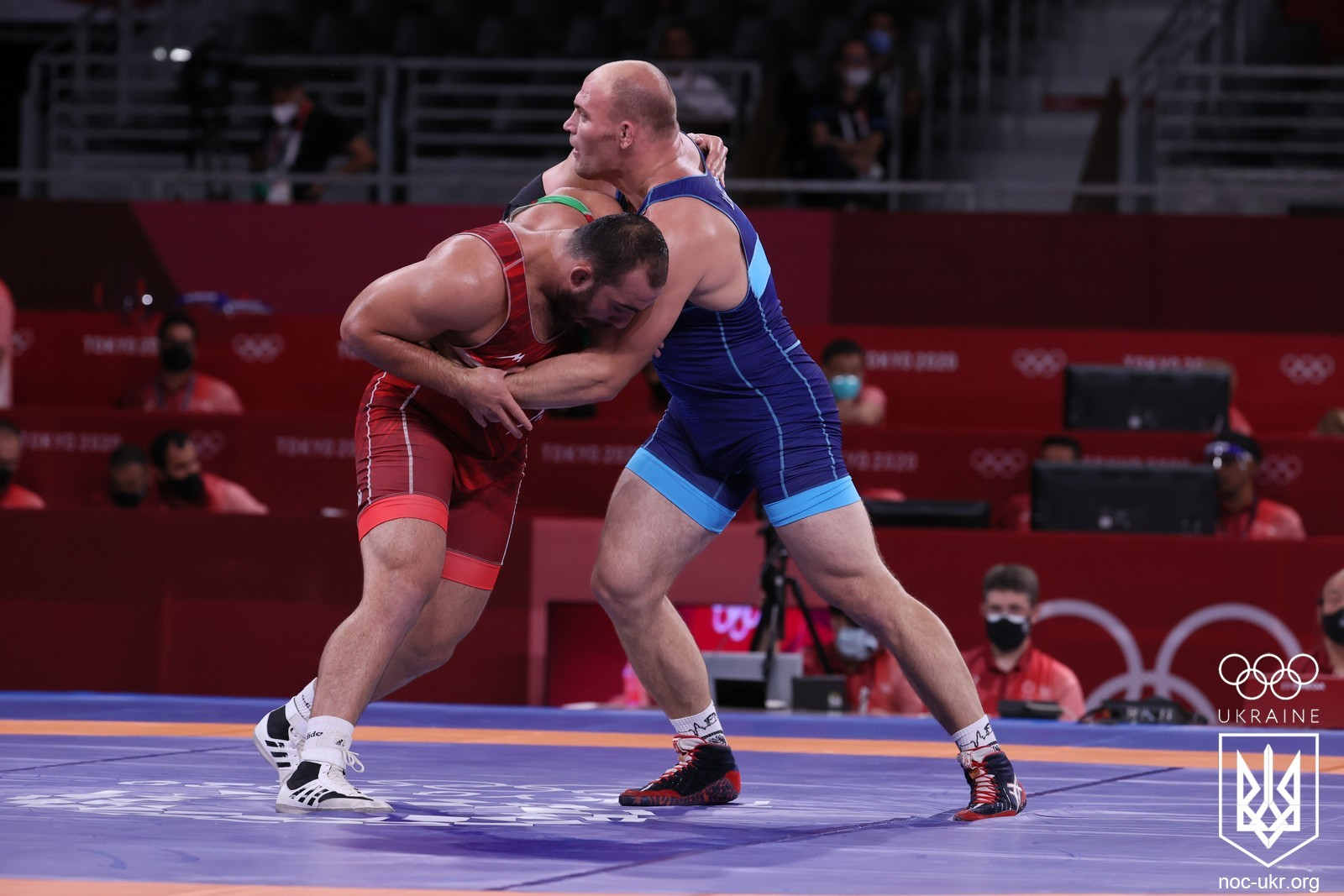
- Oleksandr Khotsianivskyi vs Amir Hossein Zare at the 2020 Summer Olympics

Personal information
- Full name: Oleksandr Iosypovych; Khotsianivskyi
- Nationality: Ukraine
- Born: 20 July 1990 (age 35) Andreyevka, Donetsk Oblast, Ukrainian SSR, Soviet Union
- Height: 1.91 m (6 ft 3 in)
- Weight: 110 kg (243 lb)

Sport
- Style: Freestyle
- Club: Dynamo Donetsk
- Coach: Grigory Danko
Medal record
Representing Ukraine
World Championships
Bronze medal – third place	2019 Nur-Sultan	125 kg
European Games
Bronze medal – third place	2019 Minsk	125 kg
European Championships
Bronze medal – third place	2014 Vantaa	125 kg
Bronze medal – third place	2019 Bucharest	125 kg
Bronze medal – third place	2021 Warsaw	125 kg
Yasar Dogu Tournament
Gold medal – first place	2018 Istanbul	125 kg
Dan Kolov & Nikola Petrov Tournament
Silver medal – second place	2019 Ruse	125 kg
Golden Grand Prix
Gold medal – first place	2013 Baku	120 kg
Gold medal – first place	2014 Baku	125 kg
Grand Prix
Gold medal – first place	2013 Odessa	120 kg
Gold medal – first place	2014 Minsk	125 kg
Gold medal – first place	2014 Grozniy	125 kg
Gold medal – first place	2015 Paris	125 kg
Gold medal – first place	2017 Minsk	125 kg
Gold medal – first place	2018 Kiev	125 kg
Gold medal – first place	2019 Kiev	125 kg
Silver medal – second place	2013 Kiev	120 kg
Silver medal – second place	2014 Khasavjurt	125 kg
Silver medal – second place	2018 Tbilisi	125 kg
Silver medal – second place	2021 Kiev	125 kg
Bronze medal – third place	2011 Kiev	120 kg
Bronze medal – third place	2012 Kiev	120 kg
Bronze medal – third place	2012 Dortmund	120 kg
Bronze medal – third place	2013 Krasnoyarsk	120 kg
Bronze medal – third place	2014 Makhachkala	125 kg
Bronze medal – third place	2014 Moscow	125 kg
Bronze medal – third place	2015 Grosny	125 kg
Bronze medal – third place	2016 Yakutsk	125 kg
Bronze medal – third place	2017 Kiev	125 kg
Bronze medal – third place	2017 Vanadzor	125 kg
Bronze medal – third place	2022 Rome	125 kg
Summer Universiade
Silver medal – second place	2013 Kazan	120 kg
Representing All-World Team
World Cup
Bronze medal – third place	2022 Coralville	Team

Oleksandr Iosypovych Khotsianivskyi (Ukrainian: Олександр Йосипович Хоцянівський; born 20 July 1990 in Donetsk) is a Ukrainian freestyle wrestler, who competes in the men's super heavyweight category.

== Career ==
He is two-time bronze European medalist and silver Universiade medalist. Khotsianivskyi represented Ukraine at the 2012 Summer Olympics in London, where he competed in the men's 120 kg category. He lost the qualifying round match to Turkey's Taha Akgül, who was able to score three points in two straight periods, leaving Khotsianivskyi without a single point.

Khotsianivskyi competed in the 125 kg event at the 2022 World Wrestling Championships held in Belgrade, Serbia. He competed at the 2024 European Wrestling Olympic Qualification Tournament in Baku, Azerbaijan hoping to qualify for the 2024 Summer Olympics in Paris, France. He was eliminated in his first match and he did not qualify for the Olympics. Khotsianivskyi also competed at the 2024 World Wrestling Olympic Qualification Tournament held in Istanbul, Turkey without qualifying for the Olympics. He was able to compete at the Olympics and he competed in the men's 125 kg event.
