= Aliaksandr Hushtyn =

Belarusian freestyle wrestler

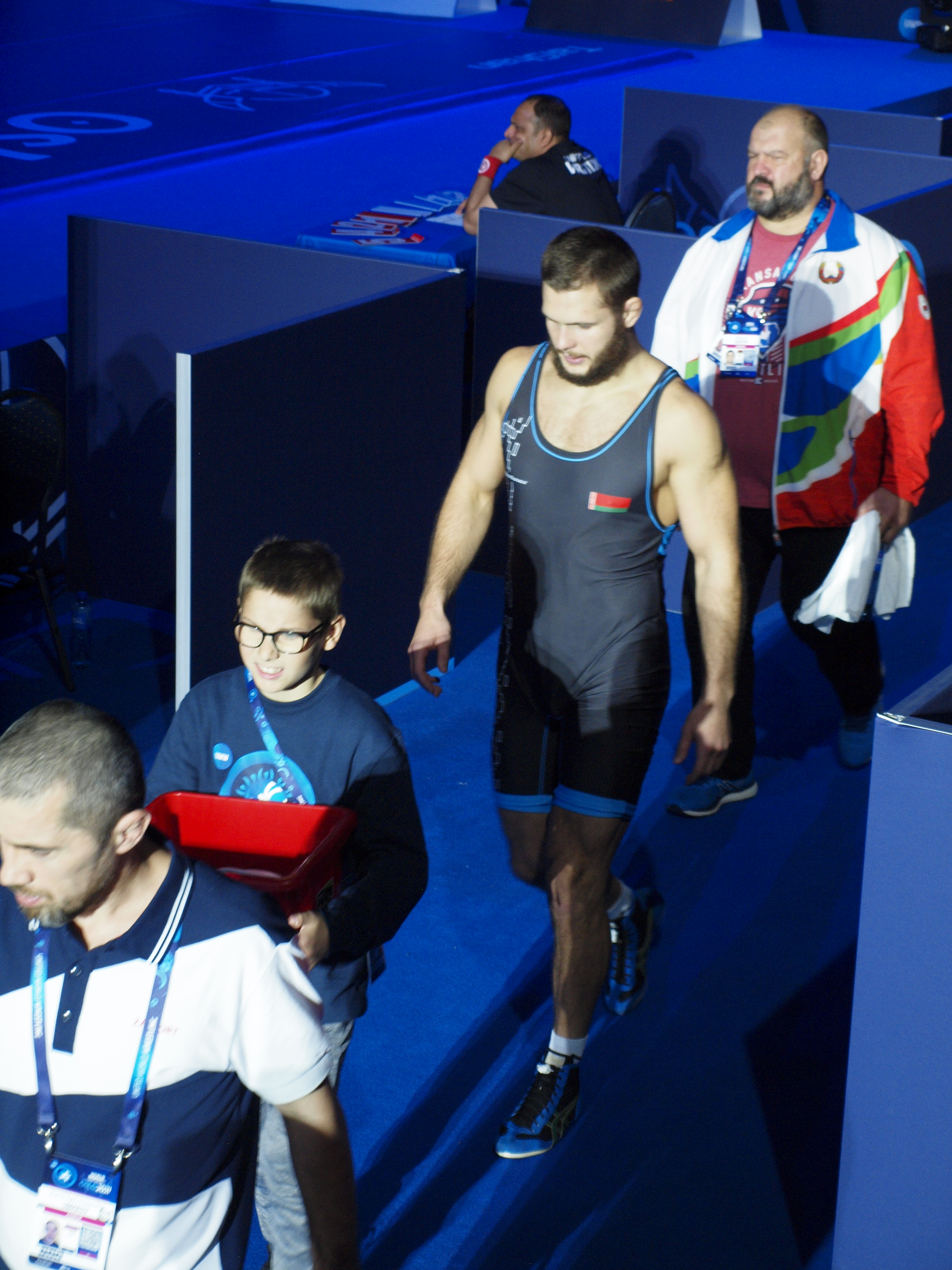
- Aliaksandr Hushtyn at the 2021 World Wrestling Championships in Oslo, Norway

Personal information
- Full name: Aliaksandr Siarheyevich Hushtyn
- Nationality: Belarus
- Born: Аляксандр Сяргеевіч Гуштын; 16 August 1993 (age 32) Svislach, Belarus
- Height: 187 cm (6 ft 2 in)

Sport
- Country: Belarus
- Sport: Amateur wrestling
- Weight class: 97 kg
- Event: Freestyle

Achievements and titles
- World finals: 5th (2021)
Medal record
Men's freestyle wrestling
Representing Belarus
Individual World Cup
Silver medal – second place	2020 Belgrade	97 kg
European Games
Bronze medal – third place	2019 Minsk	97 kg
European Championships
Silver medal – second place	2017 Novi Sad	97 kg
Silver medal – second place	2018 Kaspiysk	97 kg
Silver medal – second place	2019 Bucharest	97 kg
Military World Games
Silver medal – second place	2019 Wuhan	97 kg
Golden Grand Prix Ivan Yarygin
Silver medal – second place	2019 Krasnoyarsk	97 kg
Poddubny wrestling league
Bronze medal – third place	2022 Moscow	97 kg

Aliaksandr Siarheyevich Hushtyn (Belarusian: Аляксандр Сяргеевіч Гуштын; born 16 August 1993) is a Belarusian freestyle wrestler. He is a three-time silver medalist at the European Wrestling Championships. He represented Belarus at the 2019 European Games held in Minsk, Belarus and he won a bronze medal in the men's 97 kg event.

== Career ==
Hushtyn competed in the boys' 76 kg event at the 2010 Summer Youth Olympics held in Singapore without winning a medal. He finished in 5th place. He competed in the men's 86 kg event at the 2015 European Games held in Baku, Azerbaijan. In the same year, Hushtyn also competed in the men's 86 kg event at the 2015 World Wrestling Championships held in Las Vegas, United States where he was eliminated in his first match by Armands Zvirbulis of Latvia. A year later, he won one of the bronze medals in the men's 97 kg event at the 2016 World University Wrestling Championships held in Çorum, Turkey.

In 2017, Hushtyn initially won one of the bronze medals in the 97 kg event at the European Wrestling Championships; this became a silver medal after the original winner of the silver medal, Anzor Boltukayev from Russia, was disqualified and deprived of the medal due to doping. In 2018, he did win the silver medal in the 97 kg event at the European Wrestling Championships held in Kaspiysk, Russia. He repeated this with the silver medal in the 97 kg event at the 2019 European Wrestling Championships held in Bucharest, Romania.

Hushtyn represented Belarus at the 2019 Military World Games held in Wuhan, China and he won the silver medal in the 97 kg event. In the final, he lost against Mohammad Hossein Mohammadian of Iran. In 2020, Hushtyn won the silver medal in the men's 97 kg event at the Individual Wrestling World Cup held in Belgrade, Serbia. In the final, he lost against Abdulrashid Sadulaev of Russia. In March 2021, he qualified at the European Qualification Tournament to compete at the 2020 Summer Olympics in Tokyo, Japan. He was eliminated in his first match in the men's 97 kg event.

Two months after the Olympics, Hushtyn lost his bronze medal match in the men's 97 kg event at the 2021 World Wrestling Championships held in Oslo, Norway.

Hushtyn lost his bronze medal match in the men's 97 kg event at the 2024 European Wrestling Championships held in Bucharest, Romania. He competed at the 2024 European Wrestling Olympic Qualification Tournament in Baku, Azerbaijan and he earned a quota place for the Individual Neutral Athletes for the 2024 Summer Olympics in Paris, France.

== Major results ==
Year	Tournament	Location	Result	Event
2017	European Championships	Novi Sad, Serbia	2nd	Freestyle 97 kg
2018	European Championships	Kaspiysk, Russia	2nd	Freestyle 97 kg
2019	European Championships	Bucharest, Romania	2nd	Freestyle 97 kg
2019	European Games	Minsk, Belarus	3rd	Freestyle 97 kg
2019	Military World Games	Wuhan, China	2nd	Freestyle 97 kg
