= Anzor Boltukaev =

Russian freestyle wrestler (born 1986)

Anzor Boltukayev
Personal information
- Native name: Анзор Болтукаев
- Full name: Anzor Adamovich Boltukayev
- Nicknames: The Giant Slayer; The God of Thunder
- Nationality: Russia
- Born: 5 April 1986 (age 40) Grozny, Chechnya, Russia
- Height: 1.80 m (5 ft 11 in)

Sport
- Country: Russia
- Sport: Wrestling
- Weight class: 97-125 kg
- Event: Freestyle
- Coached by: Jaa Umarov, Ali Davudov
Medal record
Men's freestyle wrestling
Representing Russia
World Championships
Bronze medal – third place	2013 Budapest	96 kg
European Championships
Disqualified	2017 Novi Sad	97 kg
Gold medal – first place	2016 Riga	97 kg
Representing Chechnya
Russian National Championships
Gold medal – first place	2016 Yakutsk	97 kg
Gold medal – first place	2013 Krasnoyarsk	96 kg
Silver medal – second place	2014 Yakutsk	97 kg
Bronze medal – third place	2008 St.Petersburg	96 kg
Golden Grand Prix Ivan Yarygin
Gold medal – first place	2016 Krasnoyarsk	97 kg
Silver medal – second place	2017 Krasnoyarsk	125 kg
Silver medal – second place	2013 Krasnoyarsk	96 kg

Anzor Adamovich Boltukayev (Russian: Анзор Адамович Болтукаев; born 5 April 1986 in Chechnya) is a Russian freestyle wrestler of Chechen descent. He competes in the 96 kg division and won the bronze medal in the same division at the 2013 World Wrestling Championships defeated Aleksey Krupnyakov of Kyrgyzstan.

At the "Ivan Yarygin 2016" he beat the current World Champion Kyle Snyder and Olympic gold medalist Jake Varner of USA.

In the 2016 European Wrestling Championships he won the gold medal against Ivan Yankouski of Belarus.

He competed at Olympics 2016 in the freestyle 97 kg event and was eliminated by Valerii Andriitsev of Ukraine in the 1/8 final.

Boltukayev failed a drugs test at the 2017 European Wrestling Championships testing positive for higenamine. His subsequent result was disqualified and his silver medal was revoked, he was also banned for two years from 13 September 2018.
