= Rıza Yıldırım =

Turkish wrestler (born 1987)

Personal information
- Nationality: Turkish
- Born: May 6, 1987 (age 39)
- Height: 1.83 m (6 ft 0 in)
- Weight: 97 kg (214 lb)

Sport
- Country: Turkey
- Sport: Wrestling
- Event: Freestyle
- Club: Bursa BB SK
- Turned pro: 1998
- Coached by: Ismail Faikoglu
- Retired: 2019
Medal record
Men's Freestyle wrestling
Representing Turkey
European Championships
Gold medal – first place	2017 Novi Sad	97 kg
Mediterranean Games
Gold medal – first place	2013 Mersin	96 kg
Yasar Dogu Tournament
Silver medal – second place	2017 Istanbul	97 kg
World Juniors Championships
Silver medal – second place	2005 Tashkent	96 kg
Bronze medal – third place	2006 Guatemala City	96 kg
Bronze medal – third place	2007 Beijing	96 kg
World University Championship
Silver medal – second place	2008 Thessaloniki	120 kg
European Juniors Championships
Gold medal – first place	2005 Szombathely	96 kg
Bronze medal – third place	2006 Subotica	96 kg
European Cadets Championships
Gold medal – first place	2004 Istanbul	85 kg

Rıza Yıldırım (born May 6, 1987) is a European champion Turkish wrestler competing in the 97 kg division of freestyle wrestling. He is a member of Bursa Büyükşehir Belediyesi Spor Kulübü.

Yıldırım won the gold medal in the 96 kg division at the 2013 Mediterranean Games in Mersin, Turkey. He became champion at the 2017 European Wrestling Championships held in Novi Sad, Serbia.
