= Nurmagomed Gadzhiev =

Azerbaijani freestyle wrestler

Nurmagomed Gadzhiyev Нурмагомед Гаджиев
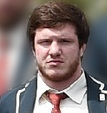

Personal information
- Full name: Nurmagomed Mutazalievich Gadzhiyev
- Nationality: Russian; Azerbaijani
- Born: 9 January 1996 (age 30) Urada village, Dagestan, Russia.
- Height: 1.81 m (5 ft 11 in)
- Weight: 97 kg (214 lb)

Sport
- Country: Azerbaijan (since 2013); Russia
- Sport: Wrestling
- Event: Freestyle
- Club: Gamid Gamidov WC
- Coached by: Sadrudin Aigubov
Medal record
Men's Freestyle Wrestling
Representing Azerbaijan
European Games
Silver medal – second place	2019 Minsk	97 kg
European Championships
Bronze medal – third place	2018 Kaspiysk	97 kg
Bronze medal – third place	2019 Bucharest	97 kg

Nurmagomed Murtazalievich Gadzhiyev (Russian: Нурмагомед Муртазалиевич Гаджиев; born 9 January 1996 in Dagestan) is a Russian former freestyle wrestler of Avar descent who represented Azerbaijan in the light heavyweight division (97 kg). Two-time European championships wrestling bronze medalist. He is a silver medalist of the second European Games in men's freestyle in 97 kg

In 2020, he was declared wanted by Russian Ministry of Internal Affairs on suspicion of murder.
