= Elizbar Odikadze =

Georgian freestyle wrestler

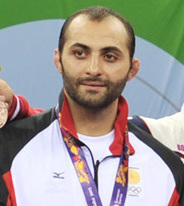
- Odikadze at the 2015 European Games

Personal information
- Nickname: Mr. Bronze
- Nationality: (Georgia (country)) Georgian
- Born: 14 June 1989 (age 37) Tbilisi, Georgian SSR, Soviet Union
- Height: 182 cm (6 ft 0 in)

Sport
- Country: Georgia
- Sport: Wrestling
- Event: Freestyle
- Coached by: Amiran Maisuradze - David Khurtsia - David Lejava
Medal record
Representing Georgia
World Championships
Bronze medal – third place	2018 Budapest	97 kg
European Games
Silver medal – second place	2015 Baku	-97 kg
Bronze medal – third place	2019 Minsk	97kg
European Championships
Bronze medal – third place	2016 Riga	-97 kg
Bronze medal – third place	2017 Novi Sad	-97 kg
Bronze medal – third place	2018 Kaspiysk	-97 kg
Bronze medal – third place	2019 Bucharest	97 kg
Bronze medal – third place	2020 Rome	97 kg
Bronze medal – third place	2021 Warsaw	97 kg
Golden Grand Prix Ivan Yarygin
Bronze medal – third place	2022 Krasnoyarsk	97 kg
Grand Prix
Bronze medal – third place	2022 Rome	97 kg
Bronze medal – third place	2022 Warsaw	97 kg

Elizbar Odikadze (Georgian: ელიზბარ ოდიკაძე, born 14 June 1989) is a Georgian freestyle wrestler. He competed in the men's freestyle 97 kg event at the 2016 Summer Olympics and 2020 Summer Olympics, at the former of which he lost the bronze medal match to Albert Saritov.
