= 2017 European Wrestling Championships =

2017 European Championship
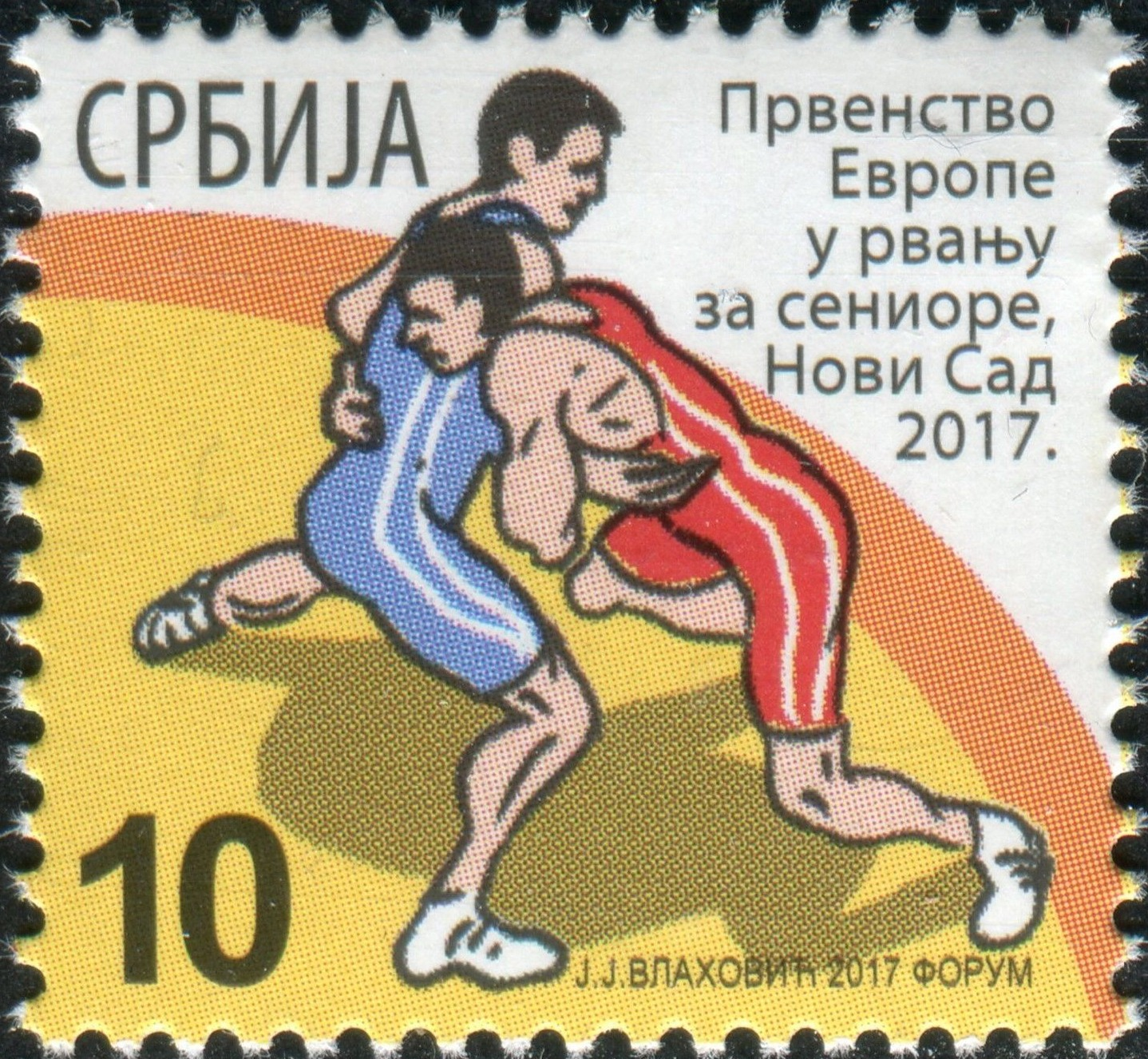
- Host city: Novi Sad, Serbia
- Dates: 2–7 May
- Stadium: SPC Vojvodina

Champions
- Freestyle: Azerbaijan
- Greco-Roman: Hungary
- Women: Russia

The 2017 European Wrestling Championships was held in Novi Sad, Serbia, from 2 to 7 May 2017. The winner of the silver medal in the 97 kg category, Anzor Boltukayev from Russia, was disqualified and deprived of the medal due to doping.

== Medal table ==
* Host nation (Serbia)

Rank	Nation	Gold	Silver	Bronze	Total
1	Russia	5	3	7	15
2	Turkey	5	1	3	9
3	Azerbaijan	2	3	3	8
4	Bulgaria	2	3	2	7
5	Hungary	2	2	4	8
6	Georgia	2	0	5	7
7	Norway	2	0	0	2
8	Belarus	1	6	2	9
9	Serbia*	1	1	1	3
10	Poland	1	1	0	2
11	Italy	1	0	1	2
12	Moldova	0	1	2	3
12	Ukraine	0	1	2	3
14	Romania	0	1	1	2
15	Latvia	0	1	0	1
16	Armenia	0	0	4	4
17	Germany	0	0	3	3
18	France	0	0	2	2
18	Sweden	0	0	2	2
20	Croatia	0	0	1	1
20	Estonia	0	0	1	1
20	Greece	0	0	1	1
20	Slovenia	0	0	1	1
Totals (23 entries)		24	24	48	96

== Team ranking ==
Rank	Men's freestyle		Women's freestyle		Men's Greco-Roman	
Rank	Team	Points	Team	Points	Team	Points
1	Azerbaijan	58	Russia	55	Hungary	57
2	Turkey	53	Azerbaijan	45	Russia	51
3	Russia	53	Belarus	43	Belarus	43
4	Georgia	44	Ukraine	40	Turkey	41
5	Armenia	30	Germany	26	Bulgaria	38
6	Bulgaria	29	Bulgaria	24	Georgia	32
7	Poland	21	Sweden	24	Serbia	31
8	Ukraine	21	Turkey	24	Ukraine	21
9	Romania	19	Moldova	23	Germany	20
10	Hungary	17	Poland	23	Armenia	19

== Medal overview ==
=== Men's freestyle ===
Event	Gold	Silver	Bronze
57 kg	Giorgi Edisherashvili; Azerbaijan	Andrei Dukov; Romania	Zaur Uguev; Russia
57 kg	Giorgi Edisherashvili; Azerbaijan	Andrei Dukov; Romania	Süleyman Atlı; Turkey
61 kg	Vladimer Khinchegashvili; Georgia	Akhmed Chakaev; Russia	Valodya Frangulyan; Armenia
61 kg	Vladimer Khinchegashvili; Georgia	Akhmed Chakaev; Russia	Andrei Perpeliță; Moldova
65 kg	Ilyas Bekbulatov; Russia	Borislav Novachkov; Bulgaria	David Habat; Slovenia
65 kg	Ilyas Bekbulatov; Russia	Borislav Novachkov; Bulgaria	Zurabi Iakobishvili; Georgia
70 kg	Frank Chamizo; Italy	Magomedmurad Gadzhiev; Poland	Ruslan Dibirgadzhiyev; Azerbaijan
70 kg	Frank Chamizo; Italy	Magomedmurad Gadzhiev; Poland	Israil Kasumov; Russia
74 kg	Soner Demirtaş; Turkey	Murad Suleymanov; Azerbaijan	Akhmed Gadzhimagomedov; Russia
74 kg	Soner Demirtaş; Turkey	Murad Suleymanov; Azerbaijan	Armen Azaryan; Armenia
86 kg	Dauren Kurugliev; Russia	Aleksander Gostiyev; Azerbaijan	Selim Yaşar; Turkey
86 kg	Dauren Kurugliev; Russia	Aleksander Gostiyev; Azerbaijan	István Veréb; Hungary
97 kg	Rıza Yıldırım; Turkey	Aliaksandr Hushtyn; Belarus	Mihail Ganev; Bulgaria
97 kg	Rıza Yıldırım; Turkey	Aliaksandr Hushtyn; Belarus	Elizbar Odikadze; Georgia
125 kg	Taha Akgül; Turkey	Jamaladdin Magomedov; Azerbaijan	Levan Berianidze; Armenia
125 kg	Taha Akgül; Turkey	Jamaladdin Magomedov; Azerbaijan	Geno Petriashvili; Georgia

=== Men's Greco-Roman ===
Event	Gold	Silver	Bronze
59 kg	Kristijan Fris; Serbia	Ivo Angelov; Bulgaria	Mingiyan Semenov; Russia
59 kg	Kristijan Fris; Serbia	Ivo Angelov; Bulgaria	Ivan Lizatović; Croatia
66 kg	Artem Surkov; Russia	Davor Štefanek; Serbia	Goga Gogiberashvili; Georgia
66 kg	Artem Surkov; Russia	Davor Štefanek; Serbia	Soslan Daurov; Belarus
71 kg	Bálint Korpási; Hungary	Pavel Liakh; Belarus	Abuyazid Mantsigov; Russia
71 kg	Bálint Korpási; Hungary	Pavel Liakh; Belarus	Aleksandar Maksimović; Serbia
75 kg	Tarek Abdelslam; Bulgaria	Chingiz Labazanov; Russia	Kazbek Kilou; Belarus
75 kg	Tarek Abdelslam; Bulgaria	Chingiz Labazanov; Russia	Tamás Lőrincz; Hungary
80 kg	Zurab Datunashvili; Georgia	Radik Kuliyeu; Belarus	Aslan Atem; Turkey
80 kg	Zurab Datunashvili; Georgia	Radik Kuliyeu; Belarus	Adlan Akiev; Russia
85 kg	Viktor Lőrincz; Hungary	Metehan Başar; Turkey	Nikolay Bayryakov; Bulgaria
85 kg	Viktor Lőrincz; Hungary	Metehan Başar; Turkey	Ramsin Azizsir; Germany
98 kg	Felix Baldauf; Norway	Aliaksandr Hrabovik; Belarus	Balázs Kiss; Hungary
98 kg	Felix Baldauf; Norway	Aliaksandr Hrabovik; Belarus	Artur Aleksanyan; Armenia
130 kg	Rıza Kayaalp; Turkey	Bálint Lám; Hungary	Vitaly Shchur; Russia
130 kg	Rıza Kayaalp; Turkey	Bálint Lám; Hungary	Levan Arabuli; Georgia

=== Women's freestyle ===
Event	Gold	Silver	Bronze
48 kg	Mariya Stadnyk; Azerbaijan	Ilona Semkiv; Ukraine	Fredrika Petersson; Sweden
48 kg	Mariya Stadnyk; Azerbaijan	Ilona Semkiv; Ukraine	Alina Vuc; Romania
53 kg	Vanesa Kaladzinskaya; Belarus	Natalia Malysheva; Russia	Nina Hemmer; Germany
53 kg	Vanesa Kaladzinskaya; Belarus	Natalia Malysheva; Russia	Maria Prevolaraki; Greece
55 kg	Bilyana Dudova; Bulgaria	Katsiaryna Hanchar; Belarus	Mathilde Rivière; France
55 kg	Bilyana Dudova; Bulgaria	Katsiaryna Hanchar; Belarus	Alyona Kolesnik; Azerbaijan
58 kg	Grace Bullen; Norway	Mariana Cherdivara; Moldova	Laura Mertens; Germany
58 kg	Grace Bullen; Norway	Mariana Cherdivara; Moldova	Emese Barka; Hungary
60 kg	Lyubov Ovcharova; Russia	Anastasija Grigorjeva; Latvia	Johanna Mattsson; Sweden
60 kg	Lyubov Ovcharova; Russia	Anastasija Grigorjeva; Latvia	Tetiana Omelchenko; Azerbaijan
63 kg	Monika Michalik; Poland	Taybe Yusein; Bulgaria	Sara da Col; Italy
63 kg	Monika Michalik; Poland	Taybe Yusein; Bulgaria	Yuliya Tkach; Ukraine
69 kg	Anastasia Bratchikova; Russia	Maryia Mamashuk; Belarus	Alla Cherkasova; Ukraine
69 kg	Anastasia Bratchikova; Russia	Maryia Mamashuk; Belarus	Koumba Larroque; France
75 kg	Yasemin Adar; Turkey	Zsanett Németh; Hungary	Svetlana Saenko; Moldova
75 kg	Yasemin Adar; Turkey	Zsanett Németh; Hungary	Epp Mäe; Estonia

== Participating nations ==
403 competitors from 38 nations participated:

- Albania (1)
- Armenia (16)
- Austria (7)
- Azerbaijan (23)
- Belgium (2)
- Belarus (24)
- Bulgaria (21)
- Croatia (4)
- Cyprus (1)
- Czech Republic (7)
- Denmark (3)
- Spain (6)
- Estonia (5)
- Finland (7)
- France (9)
- Georgia (16)
- Germany (20)
- Greece (10)
- Hungary (18)
- Israel (6)
- Italy (7)
- Latvia (6)
- Lithuania (7)
- Moldova (14)
- North Macedonia (4)
- Netherlands (1)
- Norway (7)
- Poland (18)
- Portugal (1)
- Romania (14)
- Russia (24)
- Slovenia (1)
- Serbia (20)
- Switzerland (5)
- Sweden (12)
- Slovakia (6)
- Turkey (24)
- Ukraine (24)

== See also ==
- List of European Championships medalists in wrestling (freestyle)
- List of European Championships medalists in wrestling (Greco-Roman)
- List of European Championships medalists in wrestling (women)
