= Murazi Mchedlidze =

Ukrainian freestyle wrestler (born 1994)

Murazi Mchedlidze Муразі Мчедлідзе
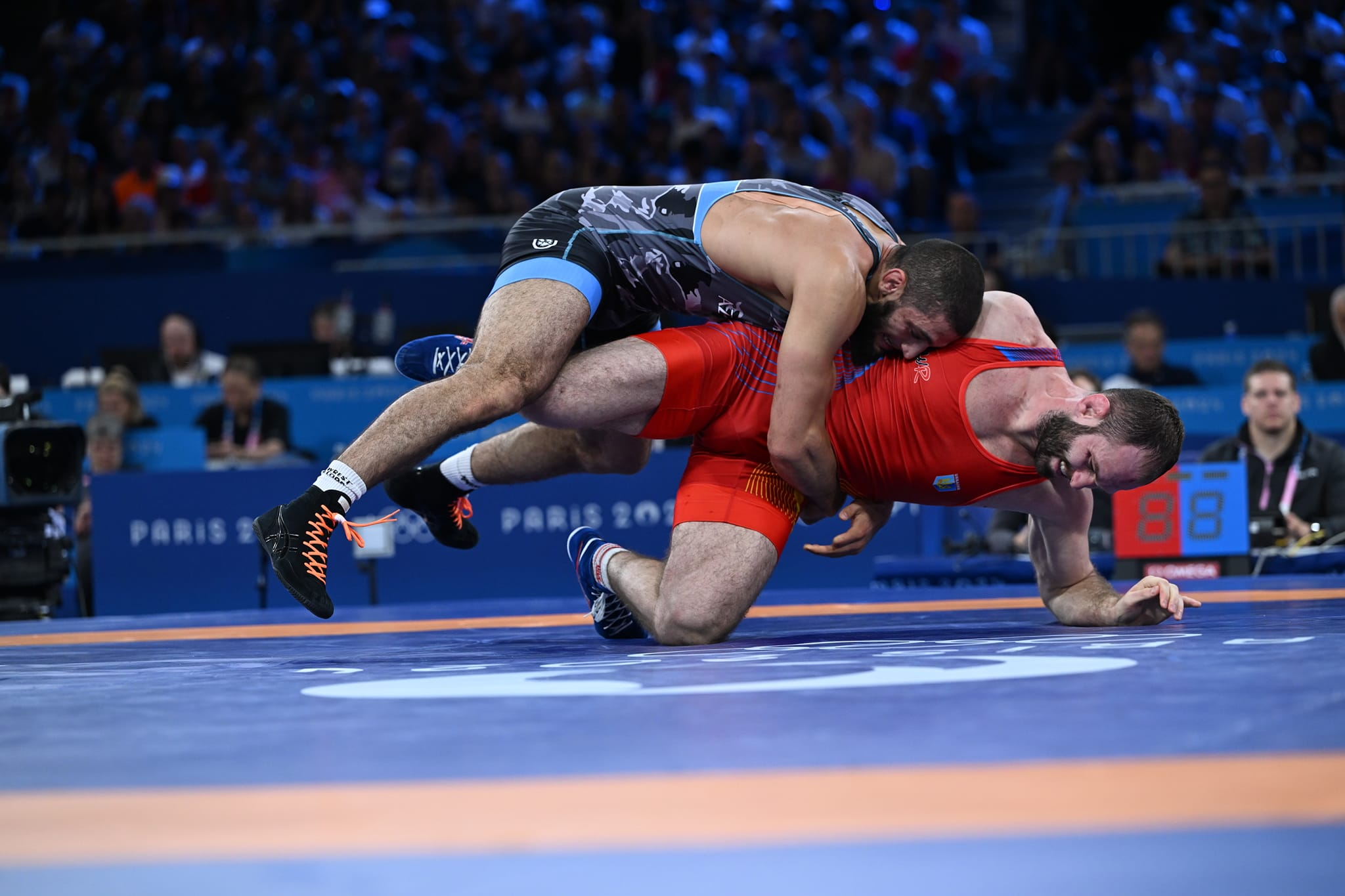

Personal information
- Full name: Muraz Guramovych Mchedlidze
- National team: Ukraine
- Born: 21 June 1994 (age 32) Dnipro, Ukraine
- Weight: 97 kg (214 lb)

Sport
- Country: Ukraine
- Sport: Sport wrestling
- Event: Freestyle
Medal record
Men's freestyle wrestling
Representing Ukraine
Grand Prix
Bronze medal – third place	2025 Zagreb	125 kg
World U23 Championships
Bronze medal – third place	2017 Bydgoszcz	97 kg
European U23 Championships
Bronze medal – third place	2017 Szombathely	97 kg
European Juniors Championships
Gold medal – first place	2014 Katowice	96 kg
Silver medal – second place	2013 Skopje	96 kg
Cadet European Championships
Bronze medal – third place	2011 Warsaw	85 kg

Muraz Guramovych Mchedlidze (Ukrainian: Мураз Гурамович Мчедлідзе; born 21 June 1994) is a Ukrainian freestyle wrestler who currently competes at 97 kilograms.

== Career ==
On 6 July 2013, in Skopje, having lost to Ali Bonceoğlu in the final, Mchedlidze won the silver medal of the European Junior Championships. In August 2013, he took part in the World Junior Championships in Sofia, but did not bring home a medal. In mid-November 2013, he won the Solidarity International Junior Tournament in Dnipropetrovsk. On 17 June 2014, in Katowice, Poland, having defeated Russian Zaynulla Kurbanov in the final, he won the gold medal at the European Junior Championship.

In early April 2015, at the Ukrainian Championships in Kharkiv, Mchedlidze reached the final, where he lost to Pavlo Oleynyk, becoming the silver medalist. In early April 2016, in Ruse, Bulgaria, he took part in the European U23 Championship, where he lost to Zainulla Kurbanov from Russia, leaving without a medal. On 23 September 2016, in Kemerovo, he won the bronze medal at the Shakhtarskaya Slava international tournament. On 1 October 2016, in Yakutsk, having lost in the final to Russian Yuri Belonovsky, he won the silver medal at the Dmitry Korkin Memorial International Tournament. In mid-November 2016, in Bucharest, as part of the Ukrainian national team, Mchedlidze won the bronze medal at the European Nations Cup. In early March 2017, in Kyiv, Mchedlidze won a bronze medal at an international tournament. On 28 March 2017, in Szombathely, Hungary, he finished in third place at the European U23 Championships. On 3 May 2017, Mchedlidze took part in the European Championships in Novi Sad, Serbia, where he lost to Anzor Boltukaev from Russia in the round of 16. Since his opponent reached the final, he took part in one of the repechage matches, in the which he was defeated by Aliaksandr Hushtyn from Belarus. On 16 September 2017, in Minsk, he won the bronze medal at the Alexander Medved Prize Grand Prix. On 26 November 2017, in Bydgoszcz, Poland, he won a bronze medal in the podium at the World U23 Wrestling Championships.

In early July 2024, it was announced that Mchedlidze would take part in the 2024 Summer Olympics in Paris, France. He competed in the men's freestyle 97 kg event at the Olympics.

== Personal life ==
Mchedlidze is the son of Guram Mchedlidze, a native of Abkhazia, a Ukrainian and Georgian freestyle wrestler, bronze medalist of the 2000 European Championship and participant of the 2000 Summer Olympics as part of the Georgian national team. His younger brother, Davyd, was mainly involved in football and switched to freestyle wrestling.
