= Artur Naifonov =

Russian freestyle wrestler (born 1997)

Artur Naifonov Артур Найфонов
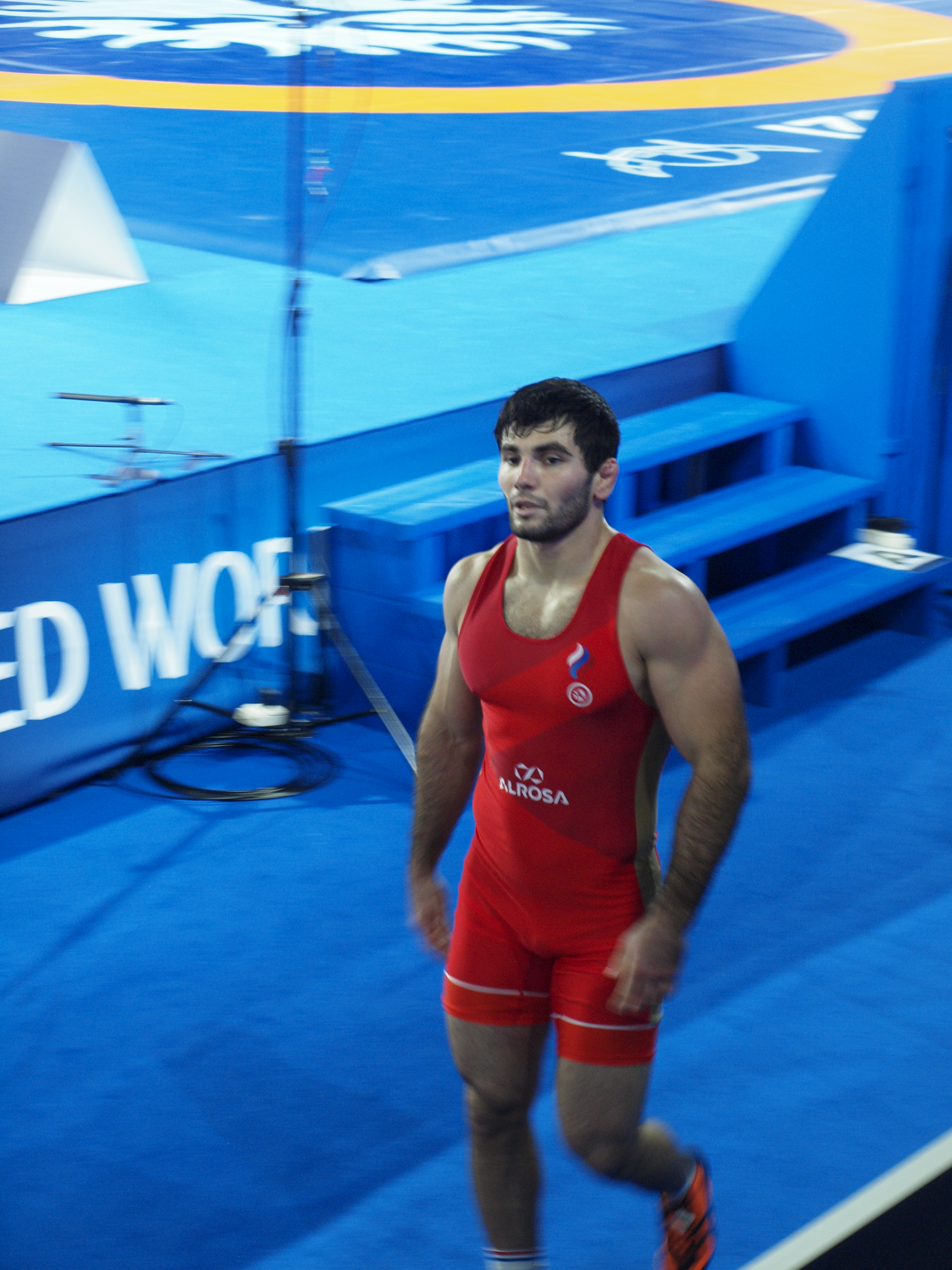
- Naifonov at the 2021 World Wrestling Championships

Personal information
- Native name: Артур Эдикович Найфонов
- Full name: Artur Edikovich Naifonov
- Nationality: Russia
- Born: 10 May 1997 (age 29) Nizhnevartovsk, Khanty-Mansi Autonomous Okrug, Russia
- Height: 175 cm (5 ft 9 in)

Sport
- Country: Russia
- Sport: Wrestling
- Weight class: 86 kg
- Rank: International Master of Sport in Freestyle wrestling
- Event: Freestyle
- Club: Wrestling Academy of Aslan Khadarstev
- Coached by: Totraz Archegov, Viktor Rozhkov, Elbrus Dudaev
Medal record
Men's Freestyle Wrestling
Representing UWW
European Championships
| Bronze medal – third place | 2025 Bratislava | 86 kg |
Representing (Russia) ROC
Olympic Games
| Bronze medal – third place | 2020 Tokyo | 86 kg |
Representing Russian Wrestling Federation
World Championships
| Bronze medal – third place | 2021 Oslo | 86 kg |
Representing Russia
World Championships
| Bronze medal – third place | 2019 Nur-Sultan | 86 kg |
European Championships
| Gold medal – first place | 2021 Warsaw | 86 kg |
| Gold medal – first place | 2020 Rome | 86 kg |
| Gold medal – first place | 2018 Kaspiysk | 86 kg |
Russian Championships
| Bronze medal – third place | 2023 Kaspiysk | 86 kg |
| Gold medal – first place | 2022 Kyzyl | 86 kg |
| Gold medal – first place | 2021 Ulan-Ude | 86 kg |
| Silver medal – second place | 2020 Naro-Fominsk | 86 kg |
| Gold medal – first place | 2019 Sochi | 86 kg |
| Silver medal – second place | 2018 Odintsovo | 86 kg |
Golden Grand Prix Ivan Yarygin
| Gold medal – first place | 2025 Krasnoyarsk | 86 kg |
| Gold medal – first place | 2024 Krasnoyarsk | 86 kg |
| Gold medal – first place | 2020 Krasnoyarsk | 86 kg |
| Silver medal – second place | 2026 Krasnoyarsk | 65 kg |
| Bronze medal – third place | 2018 Krasnoyarsk | 86 kg |
Military World Games
| Gold medal – first place | 2019 Wuhan | 86 kg |
World U23 Championships
| Silver medal – second place | 2018 Bucharest | 86 kg |
Junior World Championships
| Gold medal – first place | 2017 Tampere | 86 kg |

Artur Naifonov (Russian: Артур Эдикович Найфонов, IPA: [ɐrˈtur nɐɪ̯ˈfonəf], Iron Ossetic: Найфонты Эдичы фырт Артур; born 10 May 1997) is a Russian freestyle wrestler, who competes at 86 kilograms. Naifonov is an Olympic Games medalist, World Championship medalist, three-time European Continental champion and a three-time Russian National champion (four-time finalist).

Naifonov is a survivor of the 2004 Beslan school siege along with his sister, both receiving shrapnel wounds. His mother was killed in crossfire.

== Road to Olympic Games ==
After coming up short and taking second place at the 2020 Russian National Championships, Naifonov wasn't able to compete at the Individual World Cup and did not wrestle again until March 2021.

In order to achieve a place on the Olympic Team, Naifonov would have to take first place at the 2021 Russian National Freestyle Wrestling Championships in Ulan-Ude. Winning all of his matches, including against 2020 European Silver Medallist, Magomed Ramazanov whom Naifonov defeated in the semi-final. At one point, Ramazanov was winning with the score 8–1, before Naifonov made a comeback to win 10–8.

Naifonov would then meet his main rival in Russia, Dauren Kurugliev, representing Dagestan, in the final. Naifonov defeated Kurugliev with the score 2–1, which won Naifonov the first place on the podium, gold medal and be invited to compete for his country at the Olympic games in Tokyo.

== 2020 Olympic Games ==
Following his Russian National Championships win, Naifonov wrestled at the Olympic Games held in Tokyo. Naifonov made his Olympic debut with a win over Ossetian-Slovak transfer, Boris Makoev and defeated him 6–0, followed by a 12–1, technical fall over Turkey's Osman Göçen, advancing Naifonov into the semi-final opposite Hassan Yazdani. Yazdani won the match 7–1; however as this match was the semi-final, Naifonov was automatically placed into a third place, bronze-medal match against Dagestan-Uzbekistan transfer, Javrail Shapiev. After controlling all six minutes in a low scoring match, Naifonov won the match 2–0, securing an Olympic bronze medal.

== 2021 World Championships ==
Following his Bronze medal Olympic debut, Naifonov wanted to finish the year wrestling at the 2021 World Wrestling Championships, held in Norway. Naifonov faced Japan's Hayato Ishiguro in the round of 16 and defeated the Japanese wrestler 11–0 with advancement to the quarter-final match against Spanish representative, Taiumuraz Friev, who Naifonov beat 5–2. In the semi-final, Naifonov would, again, Yazdani and lost again, by the score 8-2 and ruining his hopes for gold.

Naifonov faced Kazakh wrestler, Azamat Dauletbekov in the bronze medal match, beating the Kazakh by 3-0 and winning his second world bronze medal.

== 2024 Olympic Games ==
He competed at the 2024 European Wrestling Olympic Qualification Tournament in Baku, Azerbaijan and he earned a quota place for the Individual Neutral Athletes for the 2024 Summer Olympics in Paris, France, but he missed these games, due to replacements by other NOCs.

== Freestyle record ==
Senior Freestyle Matches
| Res. | Record | Opponent | Score | Date | Event | Location | | | | | | | | |
|---|---|---|---|---|---|---|---|---|---|---|---|---|---|---|
| Win | 112-10 | (Kazakhstan) Azamat Dauletbekov | 3:1 | December 20, 2022 | Poddubny Wrestling League 3 | Bishkek, Kyrgyzstan | | | | | | | | |
| Semenov Championship 2022 (gold) | | | | December 20, 2022 | Poddubny Wrestling League 3 | Bishkek, Kyrgyzstan | | | | | | | | |
| Win | 111-10 | (North Ossetia–Alania) Tamerlan Tapsiev | Walkover | December 20, 2022 | Poddubny Wrestling League 3 | Bishkek, Kyrgyzstan | November 13, 2022 | Semenov Championship | Nefteyugansk, Russia | | | | | |
| Win | 110-10 | (Dagestan) Arsen-Ali Musalaliev | | November 12, 2022 | Poddubny Wrestling League 3 | Bishkek, Kyrgyzstan | November 13, 2022 | Semenov Championship | Nefteyugansk, Russia | Semenov Championship | Nefteyugansk, Russia | | | |
| Win | 109-10 | (Dagestan) Zaur Umalatov | 12:1 | November 12, 2022 | November 12, 2022 | Semenov Championship | November 13, 2022 | Semenov Championship | Nefteyugansk, Russia | Semenov Championship | Nefteyugansk, Russia | Nefteyugansk, Russia | | |
| Win | 108-10 | (Moldova) Georgy Rubaev | Fall | November 12, 2022 | November 12, 2022 | Semenov Championship | November 12, 2022 | Semenov Championship | Nefteyugansk, Russia | Semenov Championship | Nefteyugansk, Russia | Nefteyugansk, Russia | Semenov Championship | Nefteyugansk, Russia |
| Soslan Andiev Memorial 2022 (gold) | | | | | November 12, 2022 | Semenov Championship | November 12, 2022 | | | Semenov Championship | Nefteyugansk, Russia | Nefteyugansk, Russia | Semenov Championship | Nefteyugansk, Russia |
| Win | 107-10 | (North Ossetia–Alania) Zaur Makiev | 6:0 | November 5, 2022 | Soslan Andiev Memorial | Semenov Championship | November 12, 2022 | (North Ossetia–Alania) Vladikavkaz, Russia | | | | Nefteyugansk, Russia | Semenov Championship | Nefteyugansk, Russia |
| Win | 106-10 | (North Ossetia–Alania) Tamerlan Tapsiev | 10:0 | November 5, 2022 | Soslan Andiev Memorial | November 5, 2022 | Soslan Andiev Memorial | (North Ossetia–Alania) Vladikavkaz, Russia | Vladikavkaz, Russia | | | | Semenov Championship | Nefteyugansk, Russia |
| Win | 105-10 | (North Ossetia–Alania) Avetik Vereschagin | 11:0 | November 5, 2022 | Soslan Andiev Memorial | November 5, 2022 | Soslan Andiev Memorial | (North Ossetia–Alania) Vladikavkaz, Russia | Vladikavkaz, Russia | November 5, 2022 | Soslan Andiev Memorial | Vladikavkaz, Russia | | |
| Win | 104-10 | (Dagestan) Ramazan Abuzagidov | 3:9 | November 5, 2022 | Soslan Andiev Memorial | November 5, 2022 | Soslan Andiev Memorial | (North Ossetia–Alania) Vladikavkaz, Russia | Vladikavkaz, Russia | November 5, 2022 | Soslan Andiev Memorial | Vladikavkaz, Russia | Soslan Andiev Memorial | Vladikavkaz, Russia |
| Dmitry Korkin Memorial 2022 (gold) | | | | November 5, 2022 | | | Soslan Andiev Memorial | | Vladikavkaz, Russia | November 5, 2022 | Soslan Andiev Memorial | Vladikavkaz, Russia | Soslan Andiev Memorial | Vladikavkaz, Russia |
| Loss | 103-11 | (North Ossetia–Alania) Vladislav Valiev | 1:2 | November 5, 2022 | October 29, 2022 | Dmitry Korkin Memorial | (Sakha Republic) Yakutsk, Russia | | | | Soslan Andiev Memorial | Vladikavkaz, Russia | Soslan Andiev Memorial | Vladikavkaz, Russia |
| Win | 103-10 | (North Ossetia–Alania) Slavil Naniev | 11:0 | October 28, 2022 | October 29, 2022 | Dmitry Korkin Memorial | (Sakha Republic) Yakutsk, Russia | Dmitry Korkin Memorial | (Sakha Republic) Yakutsk, Russia | | | | Soslan Andiev Memorial | Vladikavkaz, Russia |
| Win | 102-10 | (Dagestan) Zaur Umalatov | 13:2 | October 28, 2022 | October 29, 2022 | Dmitry Korkin Memorial | (Sakha Republic) Yakutsk, Russia | Dmitry Korkin Memorial | (Sakha Republic) Yakutsk, Russia | October 28, 2022 | Dmitry Korkin Memorial | (Sakha Republic) Yakutsk, Russia | | |
| Poddubny Wrestling League 2 (gold) | | | | October 28, 2022 | | Dmitry Korkin Memorial | (Sakha Republic) Yakutsk, Russia | Dmitry Korkin Memorial | (Sakha Republic) Yakutsk, Russia | October 28, 2022 | Dmitry Korkin Memorial | (Sakha Republic) Yakutsk, Russia | | |
| Win | 101-10 | (North Ossetia–Alania) Vladislav Valiev | 6:0 | October 14, 2022 | Poddubny Wrestling League 2 | Moscow, Russia | | Dmitry Korkin Memorial | (Sakha Republic) Yakutsk, Russia | October 28, 2022 | Dmitry Korkin Memorial | (Sakha Republic) Yakutsk, Russia | | |
| Win | 100-10 | (Dagestan) Arsen-Ali Musalaliev | 13:0 | October 14, 2022 | Poddubny Wrestling League 2 | Moscow, Russia | October 13, 2022 | Poddubny Wrestling League 2 | Moscow, Russia | | Dmitry Korkin Memorial | (Sakha Republic) Yakutsk, Russia | | |
| Win | 99-10 | (Belarus) Roman Chitadze | 10:0 | October 14, 2022 | Poddubny Wrestling League 2 | Moscow, Russia | October 13, 2022 | Poddubny Wrestling League 2 | Moscow, Russia | October 13, 2022 | Poddubny Wrestling League 2 | (Poland) Moscow, Russia | | |
| Spartakiada (gold) | | | | | Poddubny Wrestling League 2 | Moscow, Russia | October 13, 2022 | Poddubny Wrestling League 2 | Moscow, Russia | October 13, 2022 | Poddubny Wrestling League 2 | (Poland) Moscow, Russia | | |
| Win | 98-10 | (Kabardino-Balkaria) Malik Shavaev | 2:0 | August 26, 2022 | Spartakiada | Kazan, Tatarstan | | Poddubny Wrestling League 2 | Moscow, Russia | October 13, 2022 | Poddubny Wrestling League 2 | (Poland) Moscow, Russia | | |
| Win | 97-10 | (North Ossetia–Alania) Slavik Naniev | 6:0 | August 26, 2022 | Spartakiada | Kazan, Tatarstan | August 25, 2022 | Spartakiada | Kazan, Tatarstan | | Poddubny Wrestling League 2 | (Poland) Moscow, Russia | | |
| Win | 96-10 | (North Ossetia–Alania) Arslan Bagaev | 10:0 | August 26, 2022 | Spartakiada | Kazan, Tatarstan | August 25, 2022 | Spartakiada | Kazan, Tatarstan | August 25, 2022 | Spartakiada | Kazan, Tatarstan | | |
| Russian National Championships 2022 (gold) | | | | | Spartakiada | Kazan, Tatarstan | August 25, 2022 | Spartakiada | Kazan, Tatarstan | August 25, 2022 | Spartakiada | Kazan, Tatarstan | | |
| Win | 95-10 | (Dagestan) Amanula Rasulov | 3:0 | June 26, 2022 | Russian National Championships | (Poland) Kyzyl, Tuva | | Spartakiada | Kazan, Tatarstan | August 25, 2022 | Spartakiada | Kazan, Tatarstan | | |
| Win | 95-10 | (Dagestan) Arsen-Ali Musalaliev | 6:0 | June 25, 2022 | Russian National Championships | (Poland) Kyzyl, Tuva | Russian National Championships | Kyzyl, Tuva | | | Spartakiada | Kazan, Tatarstan | | |
| Win | 94-10 | (North Ossetia–Alania) Arslan Bagaev | 3:0 | June 25, 2022 | Russian National Championships | (Poland) Kyzyl, Tuva | Russian National Championships | Kyzyl, Tuva | June 25, 2022 | Russian National Championships | Kyzyl, Tuva | | | |
| Win | 93-10 | (North Ossetia–Alania) Slavik Naniev | 4:2 | June 25, 2022 | Russian National Championships | (Poland) Kyzyl, Tuva | Russian National Championships | Kyzyl, Tuva | June 25, 2022 | Russian National Championships | Kyzyl, Tuva | June 25, 2022 | Russian National Championships | Kyzyl, Tuva |
| Poddubny Wrestling League (gold) | | | | June 25, 2022 | | | Russian National Championships | Kyzyl, Tuva | June 25, 2022 | Russian National Championships | Kyzyl, Tuva | June 25, 2022 | Russian National Championships | Kyzyl, Tuva |
| Win | 92–10 | (Russia) Dauren Kurugliev | 3-2 | May 20, 2022 | | | | | June 25, 2022 | Russian National Championships | Kyzyl, Tuva | June 25, 2022 | Russian National Championships | Kyzyl, Tuva |
| Win | 91–10 | (Belarus) Roman Chitadze | 10-0 | May 20, 2022 | May 19, 2022 | | | | | | | June 25, 2022 | Russian National Championships | Kyzyl, Tuva |
| 2021 World Championships (bronze) at 86 kg | | | | May 20, 2022 | May 19, 2022 | | | | | | | | | |
| Win | 90–10 | (Kazakhstan) Azamat Dauletbekov | 3-0 | October 3, 2021 | May 19, 2022 | | | | | | | | | |
| Loss | 89–10 | (Iran) Hassan Yazdani | 2-8 | October 3, 2021 | October 2, 2021 | | | | | | | | | |
| Win | 89–9 | (Spain) Taimuraz Friev | 5–2 | October 3, 2021 | October 2, 2021 | | | | | | | | | |
| Win | 88–9 | (Japan) Hayato Ishiguro | TF 11–0 | | October 2, 2021 | | | | | | | | | |
2020 Summer Olympics (bronze) at 86 kg
| Win | 87–9 | (Uzbekistan) Javrail Shapiev | 2–0 | August 5, 2021 | 2020 Summer Olympics | Tokyo, Japan | | | | | | | | |
| Loss | 86–9 | (Iran) Hassan Yazdani | 1–7 | August 4, 2021 | 2020 Summer Olympics | Tokyo, Japan | | | | | | | | |
| Win | 86–8 | (Turkey) Osman Göçen | TF 12–1 | August 4, 2021 | 2020 Summer Olympics | Tokyo, Japan | | | | | | | | |
| Win | 85–8 | (Slovakia) Boris Makoev | 6–0 | August 4, 2021 | 2020 Summer Olympics | Tokyo, Japan | | | | | | | | |
2021 European Championships (gold) at 86 kg
| Win | 84–8 | (Georgia (country)) Sandro Aminashvili | 8–0 | AprIl 19–21, 2021 | 2021 European Continental Championships | Warsaw, Poland | | | | | | | | |
| Win | 83–8 | (Slovakia) Boris Makoev | 9–0 | AprIl 19–21, 2021 | 2021 European Continental Championships | Warsaw, Poland | | | | | | | | |
| Win | 82–8 | (San Marino) Myles Amine | 2–0 | AprIl 19–21, 2021 | 2021 European Continental Championships | Warsaw, Poland | | | | | | | | |
| Win | 81–8 | (Azerbaijan) Gadzhimurad Magomedsaidov | 10–2 | AprIl 19–21, 2021 | 2021 European Continental Championships | Warsaw, Poland | | | | | | | | |
2021 Russian Nationals (gold) at 86 kg
| Win | 80–8 | (Dagestan) Dauren Kurugliev | 2–1 | March 11–14, 2021 | 2021 Russian National Freestyle Wrestling Championships | Ulan-Ude, Russia | | | | | | | | |
| Win | 79–8 | (Dagestan) Magomed Ramazanov | 10–8 | March 11–14, 2021 | 2021 Russian National Freestyle Wrestling Championships | Ulan-Ude, Russia | | | | | | | | |
| Win | 78–8 | (Moscow Oblast) Khabi Khashpakov | 2–1 | March 11–14, 2021 | 2021 Russian National Freestyle Wrestling Championships | Ulan-Ude, Russia | | | | | | | | |
| Win | 77–8 | (Russia) Nikita Sofronov | TF 11–0 | March 11–14, 2021 | 2021 Russian National Freestyle Wrestling Championships | Ulan-Ude, Russia | | | | | | | | |
| Win | 76–8 | (Russia) Magomed Gusbanov | | March 11–14, 2021 | 2021 Russian National Freestyle Wrestling Championships | Ulan-Ude, Russia | | | | | | | | |
2020 Russian Nationals (silver) at 86 kg
| Loss | 75–8 | (Dagestan) Dauren Kurugliev | 1–2 | October 16–18, 2020 | 2020 Russian National Freestyle Wrestling Championships | Naro-Fominsk, Russia | | | | | | | | |
| Win | 75–7 | (Dagestan) Arsen-Ali Musalaliev | 8–0 | October 16–18, 2020 | 2020 Russian National Freestyle Wrestling Championships | Naro-Fominsk, Russia | | | | | | | | |
| Win | 74–7 | (Dagestan) Magomedsharif Biyakaev | 4–0 | October 16–18, 2020 | 2020 Russian National Freestyle Wrestling Championships | Naro-Fominsk, Russia | | | | | | | | |
| Win | 73–7 | (Russia) Aslanbek Gvaramia | TF 11–0 | October 16–18, 2020 | 2020 Russian National Freestyle Wrestling Championships | Naro-Fominsk, Russia | | | | | | | | |
| Win | 72–7 | (Russia) Magomed Gusbanov | 8–2 | October 16–18, 2020 | 2020 Russian National Freestyle Wrestling Championships | Naro-Fominsk, Russia | | | | | | | | |
2020 European Championships (gold) at 86 kg
| Win | 71–7 | (San Marino) Myles Amine | 4–0 | February 15–16, 2020 | 2020 European Continental Championships | Rome, Italy | | | | | | | | |
| Win | 70–7 | (Slovakia) Boris Makoev | 3–0 | February 15–16, 2020 | 2020 European Continental Championships | Rome, Italy | | | | | | | | |
| Win | 69–7 | (Poland) Radosław Marcinkiewicz | TF 10–0 | February 15–16, 2020 | 2020 European Continental Championships | Rome, Italy | | | | | | | | |
| Win | 68–7 | (Azerbaijan) Abubakr Abakarov | 8–2 | February 15–16, 2020 | 2020 European Continental Championships | Rome, Italy | | | | | | | | |
| Win | 67–7 | (Bulgaria) Akhmed Magamaev | 5–0 | February 15–16, 2020 | 2020 European Continental Championships | Rome, Italy | | | | | | | | |
2020 Ivan Yarygin Golden Grand Prix (gold) at 86 kg
| Win | 66–7 | (Dagestan) Dauren Kurugliev | 2–1 | January 23–26, 2020 | Golden Grand Prix Ivan Yarygin 2020 | Krasnoyarsk, Russia | | | | | | | | |
| Win | 65–7 | (Dagestan) Arsen-Ali Musalaliev | 2–0 | January 23–26, 2020 | Golden Grand Prix Ivan Yarygin 2020 | Krasnoyarsk, Russia | | | | | | | | |
| Win | 64–7 | (North Ossetia–Alania) Zaur Makiev | 2–2 | January 23–26, 2020 | Golden Grand Prix Ivan Yarygin 2020 | Krasnoyarsk, Russia | | | | | | | | |
| Win | 63–7 | (United States) Brett Pfarr | 6–0 | January 23–26, 2020 | Golden Grand Prix Ivan Yarygin 2020 | Krasnoyarsk, Russia | | | | | | | | |
| Win | 62–7 | (Mongolia) Shinetur Narmandakh | TF 10–0 | January 23–26, 2020 | Golden Grand Prix Ivan Yarygin 2020 | Krasnoyarsk, Russia | | | | | | | | |
2019 Military World Games (gold) at 86 kg
| Win | 61–7 | (Germany) Ahmed Dudarov | TF 10–0 | October 21–24, 2019 | 2019 Military World Games | Warsaw, Poland | | | | | | | | |
| Win | 60–7 | (Kazakhstan) Adilet Davlumbaev | TF 13–2 | October 21–24, 2019 | 2019 Military World Games | Warsaw, Poland | | | | | | | | |
| Win | 59–7 | (France) Akhmed Aibuev | 7–0 | October 21–24, 2019 | 2019 Military World Games | Warsaw, Poland | | | | | | | | |
| Win | 58–7 | (South Korea) Lee Seungdong | TF 11–0 | October 21–24, 2019 | 2019 Military World Games | Warsaw, Poland | | | | | | | | |
| Win | 57–7 | (Iran) Ahmad Yousef Bazrighaleh | 6–3 | October 21–24, 2019 | 2019 Military World Games | Warsaw, Poland | | | | | | | | |
2019 World Championships (bronze) at 86 kg
| Win | 56–7 | (San Marino) Myles Amine | 6–0 | September 21–22, 2019 | 2019 World Wrestling Championships | Nur-Sultan, Kazakhstan | | | | | | | | |
| Win | 55–7 | (Hungary) István Veréb | TF 11–1 | September 21–22, 2019 | 2019 World Wrestling Championships | Nur-Sultan, Kazakhstan | | | | | | | | |
| Loss | 54–7 | (Iran) Hassan Yazdani | Fall | September 21–22, 2019 | 2019 World Wrestling Championships | Nur-Sultan, Kazakhstan | | | | | | | | |
| Win | 54–6 | (Uzbekistan) Javrail Shapiev | 6–0 | September 21–22, 2019 | 2019 World Wrestling Championships | Nur-Sultan, Kazakhstan | | | | | | | | |
| Win | 53–6 | (Moldova) Piotr Ianulov | 4–0 | September 21–22, 2019 | 2019 World Wrestling Championships | Nur-Sultan, Kazakhstan | | | | | | | | |
| Win | 52–6 | (Greece) Ville Heino | 5–1 | September 21–22, 2019 | 2019 World Wrestling Championships | Nur-Sultan, Kazakhstan | | | | | | | | |
2019 Poland Open (gold) at 86 kg
| Win | 51–6 | (Poland) Zbigniew Baranowski | 4–1 | August 2–4, 2019 | 2019 Ziolkowski, Pytlasinski Memorial | Warsaw, Poland | | | | | | | | |
| Win | 50–6 | (Turkey) Fatih Erdin | Fall | August 2–4, 2019 | 2019 Ziolkowski, Pytlasinski Memorial | Warsaw, Poland | | | | | | | | |
| Win | 49–6 | (Kazakhstan) Adilet Davlmbayev | 8–2 | August 2–4, 2019 | 2019 Ziolkowski, Pytlasinski Memorial | Warsaw, Poland | | | | | | | | |
| Win | 48–6 | (Poland) Radosław Marcinkiewicz | 8–1 | August 2–4, 2019 | 2019 Ziolkowski, Pytlasinski Memorial | Warsaw, Poland | | | | | | | | |
2019 Russian Nationals (gold) at 86 kg
| Win | 47–6 | (North Ossetia–Alania) Vladislav Valiev | 4–2 | July 5–7, 2019 | 2019 Russian National Freestyle Wrestling Championships | Sochi, Russia | | | | | | | | |
| Win | 46–6 | (North Ossetia–Alania) Soslan Ktsoyev | 4–0 | July 5–7, 2019 | 2019 Russian National Freestyle Wrestling Championships | Sochi, Russia | | | | | | | | |
| Win | 45–6 | (North Ossetia–Alania) Zaur Makiev | 4–0 | July 5–7, 2019 | 2019 Russian National Freestyle Wrestling Championships | Sochi, Russia | | | | | | | | |
| Win | 44–6 | (Dagestan) Magomed Ramazanov | 7–3 | July 5–7, 2019 | 2019 Russian National Freestyle Wrestling Championships | Sochi, Russia | | | | | | | | |
| Win | 43–6 | (Novosibirsk) Matvey Yakomaskin | TF 10–0 | July 5–7, 2019 | 2019 Russian National Freestyle Wrestling Championships | Sochi, Russia | | | | | | | | |
2019 Ali Aliev Memorial (gold) at 86 kg
| Win | 42–6 | (Russia) Dauren Kurugliev | 2–2 | May 1–3, 2019 | 2019 Ali Aliev Memorial | Kaspiysk, Russia | | | | | | | | |
| Win | 41–6 | (Russia) Arsen-Ali Musalaliev | 4–2 | May 1–3, 2019 | 2019 Ali Aliev Memorial | Kaspiysk, Russia | | | | | | | | |
| Win | 40–6 | (Uzbekistan) Javrail Shapiev | 3–1 | May 1–3, 2019 | 2019 Ali Aliev Memorial | Kaspiysk, Russia | | | | | | | | |
| Win | 39–6 | (Belarus) Rasul Tsikhayeu | 4–3 | May 1–3, 2019 | 2019 Ali Aliev Memorial | Kaspiysk, Russia | | | | | | | | |
| Win | 38–6 | (Moldova) Denis Balaur | 3–1 | May 1–3, 2019 | 2019 Ali Aliev Memorial | Kaspiysk, Russia | | | | | | | | |
2018 Alans International 8th at 86 kg
| Loss | 37–6 | (Russia) Slavik Naniev | Fall | December 7–9, 2018 | 2018 Alans International | Vladikavkaz, Russia | | | | | | | | |
| Win | 37–5 | (Russia) Arseniy Khubaev | 6–0 | December 7–9, 2018 | 2018 Alans International | Vladikavkaz, Russia | | | | | | | | |
2018 U23 World Championships (silver) at 86 kg
| Loss | 36–5 | (Iran) Kamran Ghasempour | 1–4 | November 12–18, 2018 | 2018 U23 World Wrestling Championships | Bucharest, Romania | | | | | | | | |
| Win | 36–4 | (Azerbaijan) Murad Süleymanov | TF 14–4 | November 12–18, 2018 | 2018 U23 World Wrestling Championships | Bucharest, Romania | | | | | | | | |
| Win | 35–4 | (Canada) Alex Moore | TF 11–0 | November 12–18, 2018 | 2018 U23 World Wrestling Championships | Bucharest, Romania | | | | | | | | |
| Win | 34–4 | (India) Uphar Sharma | TF 10–0 | November 12–18, 2018 | 2018 U23 World Wrestling Championships | Bucharest, Romania | | | | | | | | |
| Win | 33–4 | (Poland) Michał Bielawski | TF 10–0 | November 12–18, 2018 | 2018 U23 World Wrestling Championships | Bucharest, Romania | | | | | | | | |
2018 Dmitry Korkin Memorial (gold) at 92 kg
| Win | 32–4 | (Russia) Anzor Urishev | 4–3 | September 6–8, 2018 | 2018 Dmitry Korkin International Memorial | Yakutsk, Russia | | | | | | | | |
| Win | 31–4 | (Mongolia) Turtogtokh Luvsandorj | 6–0 | September 6–8, 2018 | 2018 Dmitry Korkin International Memorial | Yakutsk, Russia | | | | | | | | |
| Win | 30–4 | (Ecuador) Paredes Villagómez | TF 10–0 | September 6–8, 2018 | 2018 Dmitry Korkin International Memorial | Yakutsk, Russia | | | | | | | | |
2018 Russian Nationals (silver) at 86 kg
| Loss | 29–4 | (Dagestan) Dauren Kurugliev | 1–2 | August 3–5, 2018 | 2018 Russian National Freestyle Wrestling Championships | Odintsovo, Russia | | | | | | | | |
| Win | 29–3 | (Chechnya) Zelimkhan Minkailov | 3–0 | August 3–5, 2018 | 2018 Russian National Freestyle Wrestling Championships | Odintsovo, Russia | | | | | | | | |
| Win | 28–3 | (Moscow Oblast) Alik Shebzukhov | TF 10–0 | August 3–5, 2018 | 2018 Russian National Freestyle Wrestling Championships | Odintsovo, Russia | | | | | | | | |
2018 European Championships (gold) at 86 kg
| Win | 27–3 | (Azerbaijan) Alexander Gostiev | 1–1 | May 5–6, 2018 | 2018 European Continental Championships | Kaspiysk, Russia | | | | | | | | |
| Win | 26–3 | (Turkey) Fatih Erdin | 4–2 | May 5–6, 2018 | 2018 European Continental Championships | Kaspiysk, Russia | | | | | | | | |
| Win | 25–3 | (Italy) Shamil Kudiyamagomedov | 7–6 | May 5–6, 2018 | 2018 European Continental Championships | Kaspiysk, Russia | | | | | | | | |
| Win | 24–3 | (Poland) Zbigniew Baranowski | 9–2 | May 5–6, 2018 | 2018 European Continental Championships | Kaspiysk, Russia | | | | | | | | |
| Win | 23–3 | (Hungary) István Veréb | 5–0 | May 5–6, 2018 | 2018 European Continental Championships | Kaspiysk, Russia | | | | | | | | |
2018 Dan Kolov - Nikola Petrov Memorial (gold) at 86 kg
| Win | 22–3 | (Spain) Taimuraz Friev | INJ | March 22–25, 2018 | 2018 Dan Kolov - Nikola Petrov Memorial | Sofia, Bulgaria | | | | | | | | |
| Win | 21–3 | (Moldova) Georgy Rubaev | DQ | March 22–25, 2018 | 2018 Dan Kolov - Nikola Petrov Memorial | Sofia, Bulgaria | | | | | | | | |
| Win | 20–3 | (Italy) Shamil Kudiyamagomedov | 5–4 | March 22–25, 2018 | 2018 Dan Kolov - Nikola Petrov Memorial | Sofia, Bulgaria | | | | | | | | |
| Win | 19–3 | (Turkey) Ahmet Bilici | TF 10–0 | March 22–25, 2018 | 2018 Dan Kolov - Nikola Petrov Memorial | Sofia, Bulgaria | | | | | | | | |
| Win | 18–3 | (Russia) Vladislav Valiev | 3–2 | March 22–25, 2018 | 2018 Dan Kolov - Nikola Petrov Memorial | Sofia, Bulgaria | | | | | | | | |
2018 Ivan Yarygin Golden Grand Prix (bronze) at 86 kg
| Win | 17–3 | (Cuba) Yurieski Torreblanca | 2–1 | January 28, 2018 | Golden Grand Prix Ivan Yarygin 2018 | Krasnoyarsk, Russia | | | | | | | | |
| Loss | 16–3 | (United States) David Taylor | Fall | January 28, 2018 | Golden Grand Prix Ivan Yarygin 2018 | Krasnoyarsk, Russia | | | | | | | | |
| Win | 16–2 | (Dagestan) Dauren Kurugliev | 3–2 | January 28, 2018 | Golden Grand Prix Ivan Yarygin 2018 | Krasnoyarsk, Russia | | | | | | | | |
| Win | 15–2 | (China) Zushen Lin | TF 10–0 | January 28, 2018 | Golden Grand Prix Ivan Yarygin 2018 | Krasnoyarsk, Russia | | | | | | | | |
2017 Alans International (gold) at 86 kg
| Win | 14–2 | (Russia) Vladislav Valiev | 1–1 | November 17–19, 2017 | 2017 Alans International | Vladikavkaz, Russia | | | | | | | | |
| Win | 13–2 | (Azerbaijan) Alexander Gostiev | 4–4 | November 17–19, 2017 | 2017 Alans International | Vladikavkaz, Russia | | | | | | | | |
| Win | 12–2 | (Russia) Batyrbek Tsakulov | 11–4 | November 17–19, 2017 | 2017 Alans International | Vladikavkaz, Russia | | | | | | | | |
| Win | 11–2 | (Slovakia) Gulaev Akhsarbek | FF | November 17–19, 2017 | 2017 Alans International | Vladikavkaz, Russia | | | | | | | | |
2017 Alrosa Cup (gold) as Team RUS at 86 kg
| Win | 10–2 | (Azerbaijan) Alexander Gostiev | PP | November 9–13, 2017 | 2017 Alrosa Team Cup | Moscow, Russia | | | | | | | | |
| Win | 9–2 | (Moldova) Pavel Untila | TF | November 9–13, 2017 | 2017 Alrosa Team Cup | Moscow, Russia | | | | | | | | |
| Win | 8–2 | (Georgia (country)) Davit Khutsishvili | PP | November 9–13, 2017 | 2017 Alrosa Team Cup | Moscow, Russia | | | | | | | | |
2017 Yugra Cup (bronze) at 86 kg
| Win | 7–2 | (Russia) Arseni Khubaev | 6–2 | October 28–29, 2017 | 2017 Yugra Cup | Nefteyugansk, Russia | | | | | | | | |
| Loss | 6–2 | (Russia) Zaur Makiev | 5–12 | October 28–29, 2017 | 2017 Yugra Cup | Nefteyugansk, Russia | | | | | | | | |
| Win | 6–1 | (Russia) Aleksandr Zelenkov | 6–1 | October 28–29, 2017 | 2017 Yugra Cup | Nefteyugansk, Russia | | | | | | | | |
| Win | 5–1 | (Kazakhstan) Kanat Berdiyev | TF 10–0 | October 28–29, 2017 | 2017 Yugra Cup | Nefteyugansk, Russia | | | | | | | | |
2017 Stepan Sargsyan Cup (gold) at 86 kg
| Win | 4–1 | (Russia) Batyrbek Tsakulov | 4–0 | October 7–8, 2017 | 2017 Stepan Sargsyan Cup | Vanadzor, Armenia | | | | | | | | |
| Win | 3–1 | (Georgia (country)) David Khutsishvili | TF 10–0 | October 7–8, 2017 | 2017 Stepan Sargsyan Cup | Vanadzor, Armenia | | | | | | | | |
| Win | 2–1 | (Georgia (country)) Saba Chikhradze | TF 12–2 | October 7–8, 2017 | 2017 Stepan Sargsyan Cup | Vanadzor, Armenia | | | | | | | | |
| Win | 1–1 | (Armenia) Vahe Tamrazyan | 8–1 | October 7–8, 2017 | 2017 Stepan Sargsyan Cup | Vanadzor, Armenia | | | | | | | | |
2017 Ivan Yarygin Golden Grand Prix 17th at 86 kg
| Loss | 0–1 | (Chechnya) Akhmed Magamaev | 1–6 | January 28, 2017 | Golden Grand Prix Ivan Yarygin 2017 | Krasnoyarsk, Russia | | | | | | | | |
