= 2019 World Wrestling Championships – Men's freestyle 86 kg =

Men's freestyle 86 kg at the 2019 World Championships
- Venue: Barys Arena
- Dates: 21–22 September 2019
- Competitors: 43 from 43 nations

Medalists
gold medal	Hassan Yazdani	Iran
silver medal	Deepak Punia	India
bronze medal	Stefan Reichmuth	Switzerland
bronze medal	Artur Naifonov	Russia

The men's freestyle 86 kilograms is a competition featured at the 2019 World Wrestling Championships, and was held in Nur-Sultan, Kazakhstan on 21 and 22 September.

== Results ==
Legend

- F — Won by fall
- WO — Won by walkover

=== Finals ===
Semifinals		Final
Stefan Reichmuth (SUI)	2
Deepak Punia (IND)	8	Deepak Punia (IND)
Hassan Yazdani (IRI)	11	Hassan Yazdani (IRI)	WO
Myles Amine (SMR)	0

=== Top half ===
==== Section 1 ====
Round of 64

Round of 32
Fatih Erdin (TUR)	7
Alex Moore (CAN)	2
Taimuraz Friev (ESP)	12
Döwletmyrat Orazgylyjow (TKM)	2
~~Domenic Abounader (LBN)~~
Uri Kalashnikov (ISR)	WO
Stefan Reichmuth (SUI)	6
Edgaras Voitechovskis (LTU)	1

Round of 16
Fatih Erdin (TUR)	9
Taimuraz Friev (ESP)	9
Uri Kalashnikov (ISR)	0
Stefan Reichmuth (SUI)	10

Quarterfinals
Taimuraz Friev (ESP)	1
Stefan Reichmuth (SUI)	2

==== Section 2 ====
Round of 64

Round of 32
Michael Shinohara (GUM)	0
Carlos Izquierdo (COL)	10
Angus Arthur (JAM)	4
Pool Ambrocio (PER)	6
Oussama Regani (MAR)	0
Bakhodur Kadirov (TJK)	12
Adilet Davlumbayev (KAZ)	6
Deepak Punia (IND)	8

Round of 16
Carlos Izquierdo (COL)	3
Pool Ambrocio (PER)	1
Bakhodur Kadirov (TJK)	0
Deepak Punia (IND)	6

Quarterfinals
Carlos Izquierdo (COL)	6
Deepak Punia (IND)	7

=== Bottom half ===
==== Section 3 ====
Round of 64
Gwon Hyeok-beom (KOR)	2
Piotr Ianulov (MDA)	12
Artur Naifonov (RUS)	5
Ville Heino (FIN)	0
Aleksandr Gostiyev (AZE)	1
Javrail Shapiev (UZB)	4
Sandro Aminashvili (GEO)	9
Georgios Savvoulidis (GRE)	0

Round of 32
Hassan Yazdani (IRI)	10
Jaime Espinal (PUR)	0
István Veréb (HUN)	4
Oleksii Domanytskyi (UKR)	3
Piotr Ianulov (MDA)	0
Artur Naifonov (RUS)	4
Javrail Shapiev (UZB)	6
Sandro Aminashvili (GEO)	3

Round of 16
Hassan Yazdani (IRI)	9^{F}
István Veréb (HUN)	2
Artur Naifonov (RUS)	6
Javrail Shapiev (UZB)	0

Quarterfinals
Hassan Yazdani (IRI)	4^{F}
Artur Naifonov (RUS)	2

==== Section 4 ====
Round of 64
Ali Shabanau (BLR)	1
Myles Amine (SMR)	5
Lin Zushen (CHN)	1
Yurieski Torreblanca (CUB)	2
Sosuke Takatani (JPN)	13
Aligadzhi Gamidgadzhiev (KGZ)	6
Pedro Ceballos (VEN)	2
Svetoslav Dimitrov (BUL)	3
Orgodolyn Üitümen (MGL)	3
Zbigniew Baranowski (POL)	3
Pat Downey (USA)	11
Hovhannes Mkhitaryan (ARM)	1
Akhmed Aibuev (FRA)	1
Ahmed Dudarov (GER)	12

Round of 32
Myles Amine (SMR)	3
Yurieski Torreblanca (CUB)	2
Sosuke Takatani (JPN)	8
Svetoslav Dimitrov (BUL)	1
Zbigniew Baranowski (POL)	2
Pat Downey (USA)	8
Ahmed Dudarov (GER)	4
Boris Makoev (SVK)	4

Round of 16
Myles Amine (SMR)	5
Sosuke Takatani (JPN)	2
Pat Downey (USA)	0
Ahmed Dudarov (GER)	13

Quarterfinals
Myles Amine (SMR)	4
Ahmed Dudarov (GER)	2

=== Repechage ===
Repechage round 2
Adilet Davlumbayev (KAZ)	3
Bakhodur Kadirov (TJK)	0
Jaime Espinal (PUR)	2
István Veréb (HUN)	10

Repechage round 3
Adilet Davlumbayev (KAZ)	13
Carlos Izquierdo (COL)	21
István Veréb (HUN)	1
Artur Naifonov (RUS)	11

Bronze medals
Carlos Izquierdo (COL)	0
Stefan Reichmuth (SUI)	3
Artur Naifonov (RUS)	6
Myles Amine (SMR)	0
