= 2018 World Wrestling Championships – Men's freestyle 86 kg =

Men's freestyle 86 kg at the 2018 World Championships
- Venue: László Papp Budapest Sports Arena
- Dates: 20–21 October 2018
- Competitors: 31 from 31 nations

Medalists
gold medal	David Taylor	United States
silver medal	Fatih Erdin	Turkey
bronze medal	Taimuraz Friev	Spain
bronze medal	Hassan Yazdani	Iran

The men's freestyle 86 kilograms is a competition featured at the 2018 World Wrestling Championships, and was held in Budapest, Hungary on 20 and 21 October.

This freestyle wrestling competition consists of a single-elimination tournament, with a repechage used to determine the winner of two bronze medals. The two finalists face off for gold and silver medals. Each wrestler who loses to one of the two finalists moves into the repechage, culminating in a pair of bronze medal matches featuring the semifinal losers each facing the remaining repechage opponent from their half of the bracket.

== Results ==
Legend

- F — Won by fall

=== Final ===
Final
Fatih Erdin (TUR)	2
David Taylor (USA)	12

=== Top half ===
Round of 32
Ahmed Dudarov (GER)	4
Boris Makoev (SVK)	5^{F}
Kim Gwan-uk (KOR)	10
Akhmed Aibuev (FRA)	0
Pawan Kumar (IND)	0
Mraz Dzhafarian (UKR)	6
Ville Heino (FIN)	10
Domenic Abounader (LBN)	0
Edgaras Voitechovskis (LTU)	7
István Veréb (HUN)	4
Stefan Reichmuth (SUI)	4
Shota Shirai (JPN)	1
Pool Ambrocio (PER)	0
Taimuraz Friev (ESP)	8

Round of 16
Fatih Erdin (TUR)	8
Boris Makoev (SVK)	7
Kim Gwan-uk (KOR)	9
Mraz Dzhafarian (UKR)	3
Ville Heino (FIN)	9
Edgaras Voitechovskis (LTU)	2
Stefan Reichmuth (SUI)	1
Taimuraz Friev (ESP)	4

Quarterfinals
Fatih Erdin (TUR)	10
Kim Gwan-uk (KOR)	0
Ville Heino (FIN)	10
Taimuraz Friev (ESP)	10

Semifinals
Fatih Erdin (TUR)	7
Taimuraz Friev (ESP)	4

=== Bottom half ===
Round of 32
Sandro Aminashvili (GEO)	6
Carlos Izquierdo (COL)	2
Piotr Ianulov (MDA)	2
Zbigniew Baranowski (POL)	5
Pedro Ceballos (VEN)	11
Guma Babiker Bashir (SUD)	0
Murad Suleymanov (AZE)	0
Dauren Kurugliev (RUS)	7
Lin Zushen (CHN)	0
Orgodolyn Üitümen (MGL)	10
Abdurasul Vakhobov (UZB)	2
Yurieski Torreblanca (CUB)	6
Hajy Rajabau (BLR)	9
Adilet Davlumbayev (KAZ)	2
Hassan Yazdani (IRI)	6
David Taylor (USA)	11

Round of 16
Sandro Aminashvili (GEO)	0
Zbigniew Baranowski (POL)	9
Pedro Ceballos (VEN)	0
Dauren Kurugliev (RUS)	7
Orgodolyn Üitümen (MGL)	2
Yurieski Torreblanca (CUB)	4
Hajy Rajabau (BLR)	0
David Taylor (USA)	10

Quarterfinals
Zbigniew Baranowski (POL)	1
Dauren Kurugliev (RUS)	5
Yurieski Torreblanca (CUB)	0
David Taylor (USA)	8

Semifinals
Dauren Kurugliev (RUS)	5
David Taylor (USA)	7

=== Repechage ===
Repechage round 1
Hassan Yazdani (IRI)	10
Hajy Rajabau (BLR)	0

Repechage round 2
Boris Makoev (SVK)	1
Kim Gwan-uk (KOR)	2
Hassan Yazdani (IRI)	10
Yurieski Torreblanca (CUB)	0

Bronze medals
Kim Gwan-uk (KOR)	2
Taimuraz Friev (ESP)	7
Hassan Yazdani (IRI)	11
Dauren Kurugliev (RUS)	5
