= 2010 World Wrestling Championships – Men's freestyle 84 kg =

Wrestling competition held in Moscow, Russia

Men's freestyle 84 kg at the 2010 World Championships
- Venue: Olympic Stadium
- Dates: 11 September 2010
- Competitors: 33 from 33 nations

Medalists
gold medal	Mihail Ganev	Bulgaria
silver medal	Zaurbek Sokhiev	Uzbekistan
bronze medal	Soslan Ktsoev	Russia
bronze medal	Reineris Salas	Cuba

The men's freestyle 84 kilograms is a competition featured at the 2010 World Wrestling Championships, and was held at the Olympic Stadium in Moscow, Russia on 11 September.

== Results ==
Legend

- C — Won by 3 cautions given to the opponent
- F — Won by fall
- WO — Won by walkover

=== Finals ===
Semifinals			Final
Soslan Ktsoev (RUS)	0	3
Mihail Ganev (BUL)	6	4	Mihail Ganev (BUL)	1	0	4
Zaurbek Sokhiev (UZB)	1	1	Zaurbek Sokhiev (UZB)	0	4	2
Ibragim Aldatov (UKR)	0	0

=== Top half ===
==== Section 1 ====
Round of 64

Round of 32
Donald Brown (CAN)	0	0
Soslan Ktsoev (RUS)	1	7
Yuri Maier (ARG)	0	0
Davyd Bichinashvili (GER)	3	5
Emzarios Bentinidis (GRE)	7	4
Anthony Fasugba (ITA)	0	0
Novruz Temrezov (AZE)	2	3
Gökhan Yavaşer (TUR)	0	0

Round of 16
Soslan Ktsoev (RUS)	1	6
Davyd Bichinashvili (GER)	0	0
Emzarios Bentinidis (GRE)	1	0
Novruz Temrezov (AZE)	3	1

Quarterfinals
Soslan Ktsoev (RUS)	2	1	2
Novruz Temrezov (AZE)	1	1	1

==== Section 2 ====
Round of 64

Round of 32
Stephen Hill (NZL)	0	0
Mihail Ganev (BUL)	4	3
Piotr Ianulov (MDA)	3	1
Lee Jae-sung (KOR)	0	1
Dejan Bogdanov (MKD)	1
Maciej Balawender (POL)	4^{F}
Atsushi Matsumoto (JPN)	3	6	3^{C}
Gerald Meyer (RSA)	5	0	1

Round of 16
Mihail Ganev (BUL)	0	1	1
Piotr Ianulov (MDA)	1	0	0
Maciej Balawender (POL)	5	4
Atsushi Matsumoto (JPN)	3	1

Quarterfinals
Mihail Ganev (BUL)	0	1	5
Maciej Balawender (POL)	1	1	2

=== Bottom half ===
==== Section 3 ====
Round of 64

Round of 32
Vadim Laliev (ARM)	4	6
Abraham Vassallo (MLT)	0	0
Ehsan Lashgari (IRI)	1	1
Gheorghiță Ștefan (ROU)	2	2
Zaurbek Sokhiev (UZB)	1	3
Dorjvaanchigiin Tügjdorj (MGL)	0	0
Reineris Salas (CUB)	4	2
Jake Herbert (USA)	0	0

Round of 16
Vadim Laliev (ARM)	0	4	1
Gheorghiță Ștefan (ROU)	1	0	0
Zaurbek Sokhiev (UZB)	2	2
Reineris Salas (CUB)	1	1

Quarterfinals
Vadim Laliev (ARM)	0	0
Zaurbek Sokhiev (UZB)	3	1

==== Section 4 ====
Round of 64
Amarhajy Mahamedau (BLR)	4	0	0
Kanat Berdiyev (KAZ)	0	2	4

Round of 32
Jaime Espinal (PUR)	0	2
Ibragim Aldatov (UKR)	3	8
Ricardo Roberty (VEN)	1	7
Boris Andonov (ESP)	0	0
Dato Marsagishvili (GEO)	7	6
István Veréb (HUN)	0	0
Armands Zvirbulis (LAT)	1	0	0
Kanat Berdiyev (KAZ)	0	1	1

Round of 16
Ibragim Aldatov (UKR)	2	6
Ricardo Roberty (VEN)	0	0
Dato Marsagishvili (GEO)	5^{F}
Kanat Berdiyev (KAZ)	1

Quarterfinals
Ibragim Aldatov (UKR)	1	1
Dato Marsagishvili (GEO)	0	0

=== Repechage ===
Repechage round 2
Stephen Hill (NZL)	0	0
Piotr Ianulov (MDA)	6	7
Dorjvaanchigiin Tügjdorj (MGL)	0	0
Reineris Salas (CUB)	3	1

Repechage round 3
Piotr Ianulov (MDA)	1	2
Maciej Balawender (POL)	0	1
Reineris Salas (CUB)	7	2
Vadim Laliev (ARM)	4	0

Bronze medals
Piotr Ianulov (MDA)	0	3
Soslan Ktsoev (RUS)	1	6
Reineris Salas (CUB)	W	O
Ibragim Aldatov (UKR)
