= 2015 World Wrestling Championships – Men's freestyle 86 kg =

Men's freestyle 86 kg at the 2015 World Championships
- Venue: Orleans Arena
- Dates: 11 September 2015
- Competitors: 43 from 43 nations

Medalists
| gold medal | Abdulrashid Sadulaev | Russia |
| silver medal | Selim Yaşar | Turkey |
| bronze medal | Sandro Aminashvili | Georgia |
| bronze medal | Alireza Karimi | Iran |

The men's freestyle 86 kilograms is a competition featured at the 2015 World Wrestling Championships, and was held in Las Vegas, United States on 11 September 2015.

== Results ==
Legend

- F — Won by fall
- R — Retired
- WO — Won by walkover

=== Finals ===
| Semifinals | | Final |
| Selim Yaşar (TUR) | 5 |
| Magomedgadzhi Khatiyev (AZE) | 4 | Selim Yaşar (TUR) | 0 |
| Abdulrashid Sadulaev (RUS) | 6 | Abdulrashid Sadulaev (RUS) | 6 |
| Alireza Karimi (IRI) | 2 |

=== Top half ===
==== Section 1 ====
Round of 64

Round of 32
Selim Yaşar (TUR) | 11
Jaime Espinal (PUR) | 0
Jake Herbert (USA) | 1
Sandro Aminashvili (GEO) | 6
Marco Riesen (SUI) | 10^{F}
Naresh Kumar (IND) | 0
Reineris Salas (CUB) | 4
Pedro Ceballos (VEN) | 4

Round of 16
Selim Yaşar (TUR) | 2
Sandro Aminashvili (GEO) | 0
Marco Riesen (SUI) | 3
Pedro Ceballos (VEN) | 6

Quarterfinals
Selim Yaşar (TUR) | 10
Pedro Ceballos (VEN) | 0

==== Section 2 ====
Round of 64

Round of 32
Aron Caneva (ITA) | 10
Connor Evans (AUS) | 0
Armands Zvirbulis (LAT) | 4
Aliaksandr Hushtyn (BLR) | 3
Halil Zubairov (MKD) | 0
Magomedgadzhi Khatiyev (AZE) | 10
Alex Dolly (IRL) | 10
Nathaniel Tuamoheloa (ASA) | 0

Round of 16
Aron Caneva (ITA) | 1
Armands Zvirbulis (LAT) | 14
Magomedgadzhi Khatiyev (AZE) | 10
Alex Dolly (IRL) | 0

Quarterfinals
Armands Zvirbulis (LAT) | 1
Magomedgadzhi Khatiyev (AZE) | 12

=== Bottom half ===
==== Section 3 ====
Round of 64
Radosław Marcinkiewicz (POL) | 3
Orgodolyn Üitümen (MGL) | 6^{F}
David Radchenko (ISR) | 12
Vratislav Chotaš (CZE) | 2
Abdulrashid Sadulaev (RUS) | 11
Shinya Matsumoto (JPN) | 0

Round of 32
Pool Ambrocio (PER) | 0
Mihail Ganev (BUL) | 3
Adilet Davlumbayev (KAZ) | 12
Taimuraz Friev (ESP) | 9
Daniar Kobonov (KGZ)
Orgodolyn Üitümen (MGL) | WO
David Radchenko (ISR) | 0
Abdulrashid Sadulaev (RUS) | 4^{F}

Round of 16
Mihail Ganev (BUL) | 13
Adilet Davlumbayev (KAZ) | 9
Orgodolyn Üitümen (MGL) | 0
Abdulrashid Sadulaev (RUS) | 10

Quarterfinals
Mihail Ganev (BUL) | 0
Abdulrashid Sadulaev (RUS) | 10

==== Section 4 ====
Round of 64
Alireza Karimi (IRI) | 11
Umidjon Ismanov (UZB) | 0
István Veréb (HUN) | 4
Piotr Ianulov (MDA) | 9
Ville Heino (FIN) | 3
Musa Murtazaliev (ARM) | 2
Dominic Peter (AUT) | 1
Adrian Jaoude (BRA) | 3
Muhammad Inam (PAK) | 2
Ibragim Aldatov (UKR) | 12
Tamerlan Tagziev (CAN) | 0
Gheorghiță Ștefan (ROU) | 2
Bi Shengfeng (CHN) | 9
Kim Gwan-uk (KOR) | 15
Bakhodur Kadirov (TJK) | 1
William Harth (GER) | 5

Round of 32
Alireza Karimi (IRI) | 14
Piotr Ianulov (MDA) | 7
Ville Heino (FIN) | 3
Adrian Jaoude (BRA) | 2
Ibragim Aldatov (UKR) | 12
Gheorghiță Ștefan (ROU) | 0
Kim Gwan-uk (KOR) | 2
William Harth (GER) | 3

Round of 16
Alireza Karimi (IRI) | 10
Ville Heino (FIN) | 0
Ibragim Aldatov (UKR) | 10
William Harth (GER) | 0

Quarterfinals
Alireza Karimi (IRI) | 16
Ibragim Aldatov (UKR) | 4

=== Repechage ===
Repechage round 1
Shinya Matsumoto (JPN) | 12
David Radchenko (ISR) | 2

Repechage round 2
Jaime Espinal (PUR) | 1
Sandro Aminashvili (GEO) | 5
Shinya Matsumoto (JPN) | 4
Orgodolyn Üitümen (MGL) | 5

Repechage round 3
Sandro Aminashvili (GEO) | 5
Pedro Ceballos (VEN) | 3
Orgodolyn Üitümen (MGL) | 0
Mihail Ganev (BUL) | 11

Bronze medals
Sandro Aminashvili (GEO) | 0
Magomedgadzhi Khatiyev (AZE) | 1^{R}
Mihail Ganev (BUL) | 0
Alireza Karimi (IRI) | 12
