= 2017 World Wrestling Championships – Men's freestyle 86 kg =

Men's freestyle 86 kg at the 2017 World Championships
- Venue: AccorHotels Arena
- Dates: 25 August 2017
- Competitors: 34 from 34 nations

Medalists
gold medal	Hassan Yazdani	Iran
silver medal	Boris Makoev	Slovakia
bronze medal	Vladislav Valiev	Russia
bronze medal	J'den Cox	United States

The men's freestyle 86 kilograms is a competition featured at the 2017 World Wrestling Championships, and was held in Paris, France on 25 August 2017.

== Results ==
=== Finals ===
Semifinals		Final
Vladislav Valiev (RUS)	0
Hassan Yazdani (IRI)	4	Hassan Yazdani (IRI)	10
Boris Makoev (SVK)	6	Boris Makoev (SVK)	0
J'den Cox (USA)	3

=== Top half ===
==== Section 1 ====
Round of 64

Round of 32
Selim Yaşar (TUR)	10
Wang Shao-wen (TPE)	0
Toby Fitzpatrick (NZL)	3
Jaime Espinal (PUR)	13
David Radchenko (ISR)	1
Kim Gwan-uk (KOR)	12
Saifedine Alekma (FRA)	2
Vladislav Valiev (RUS)	11

Round of 16
Selim Yaşar (TUR)	8
Jaime Espinal (PUR)	0
Kim Gwan-uk (KOR)	7
Vladislav Valiev (RUS)	9

Quarterfinals
Selim Yaşar (TUR)	1
Vladislav Valiev (RUS)	3

==== Section 2 ====
Round of 64

Round of 32
Piotr Ianulov (MDA)	8
Pool Ambrocio (PER)	0
Hassan Yazdani (IRI)	12
Azamat Dauletbekov (KAZ)	2
Baktyiar Karagul Uulu (KGZ)	0
Aleksandr Gostiyev (AZE)	10
Davit Khutsishvili (GEO)	6
Jordan Steen (CAN)	0

Round of 16
Piotr Ianulov (MDA)	0
Hassan Yazdani (IRI)	10
Aleksandr Gostiyev (AZE)	4
Davit Khutsishvili (GEO)	0

Quarterfinals
Hassan Yazdani (IRI)	10
Aleksandr Gostiyev (AZE)	0

=== Bottom half ===
==== Section 3 ====
Round of 64

Round of 32
Boris Makoev (SVK)	10
Rachid Ouribi (MAR)	0
Carlos Izquierdo (COL)	2
Mihail Ganev (BUL)	6
Daniel Rama (ESP)	1
Edgaras Voitechovskis (LTU)	5
Umidjon Ismanov (UZB)	3
Yurieski Torreblanca (CUB)	3

Round of 16
Boris Makoev (SVK)	8
Mihail Ganev (BUL)	1
Edgaras Voitechovskis (LTU)	0
Yurieski Torreblanca (CUB)	2

Quarterfinals
Boris Makoev (SVK)	7
Yurieski Torreblanca (CUB)	3

==== Section 4 ====
Round of 64
Orgodolyn Üitümen (MGL)	3
Liubomyr Sagaliuk (UKR)	6
Deepak Punia (IND)	2
Masao Matsusaka (JPN)	5

Round of 32
Ahmed Dudarov (GER)	1
J'den Cox (USA)	6
Loma Luyeye (COD)	0
Ville Heino (FIN)	10
István Veréb (HUN)	7
Liubomyr Sagaliuk (UKR)	3
Masao Matsusaka (JPN)	2
Zbigniew Baranowski (POL)	3

Round of 16
J'den Cox (USA)	9
Ville Heino (FIN)	6
István Veréb (HUN)	5
Zbigniew Baranowski (POL)	9

Quarterfinals
J'den Cox (USA)	3
Zbigniew Baranowski (POL)	2

=== Repechage ===
Repechage round 2
Azamat Dauletbekov (KAZ)	1
Piotr Ianulov (MDA)	4
Rachid Ouribi (MAR)	0
Mihail Ganev (BUL)	10

Repechage round 3
Piotr Ianulov (MDA)	2
Aleksandr Gostiyev (AZE)	5
Mihail Ganev (BUL)	6
Yurieski Torreblanca (CUB)	4

Bronze medals
Aleksandr Gostiyev (AZE)	1
Vladislav Valiev (RUS)	3
Mihail Ganev (BUL)	0
J'den Cox (USA)	8
