= 2018 European Wrestling Championships – Men's freestyle 86 kg =

The men's freestyle 86 kg is a competition featured at the 2018 European Wrestling Championships, and was held in Kaspiysk, Russia on May 5 and May 6.

== Medalists ==
Gold	Artur Naifonov; Russia
Silver	Aleksander Gostiyev; Azerbaijan
Bronze	Sandro Aminashvili; Georgia
Bronze	Shamil Kudiiamagomedov; Italy

== Results ==
Legend

- F — Won by fall

=== Final ===
Final
Aleksander Gostiyev (AZE)	1
Artur Naifonov (RUS)	1

=== Top half ===
Round of 32

Round of 16
Aleksander Gostiyev (AZE)	10
Mehmed Gazi (BUL)	0
Ahmed Dudarov (GER)	5
Ville Heino (FIN)	1
Denis Balaur (MDA)	1
Stefan Reichmuth (SUI)	3
Sandro Aminashvili (GEO)	9
Mraz Dzhafarian (UKR)	2

Quarterfinals
Aleksander Gostiyev (AZE)	6
Ahmed Dudarov (GER)	0
Stefan Reichmuth (SUI)	0
Sandro Aminashvili (GEO)	4

Semifinals
Aleksander Gostiyev (AZE)	6
Sandro Aminashvili (GEO)	0

=== Bottom half ===
Round of 32
István Veréb (HUN)	0
Artur Naifonov (RUS)	5
Raman Chytadze (BLR)	0
Zbigniew Baranowski (POL)	10

Round of 16
Marzpet Galstyan (ARM)	2
Fatih Erdin (TUR)	8
Naib Ilaldayev (SWE)	1
Taimuraz Friev (ESP)	12
Shamil Kudiiamagomedov (ITA)	4
Boris Makoev (SVK)	0
Artur Naifonov (RUS)	9
Zbigniew Baranowski (POL)	2

Quarterfinals
Fatih Erdin (TUR)	5
Taimuraz Friev (ESP)	3
Shamil Kudiiamagomedov (ITA)	6
Artur Naifonov (RUS)	7

Semifinals
Fatih Erdin (TUR)	2
Artur Naifonov (RUS)	4

=== Repechage ===
Repechage round 1
István Veréb (HUN)	2
Zbigniew Baranowski (POL)	9

Repechage round 2
Mehmed Gazi (BUL)	0
Ahmed Dudarov (GER)	10
Zbigniew Baranowski (POL)	4
Shamil Kudiiamagomedov (ITA)	4

Bronze medal match
Ahmed Dudarov (GER)	4
Sandro Aminashvili (GEO)	4
Shamil Kudiiamagomedov (ITA)	8
Fatih Erdin (TUR)	4
