= 2019 European Wrestling Championships – Men's freestyle 86 kg =

The men's freestyle 86 kg is a competition featured at the 2019 European Wrestling Championships, and was held in Bucharest, Romania on April 9 and April 10.

== Medalists ==
Gold	Vladislav Valiev; Russia
Silver	Piotr Ianulov; Moldova
Bronze	Fatih Erdin; Turkey
Bronze	Ali Shabanau; Belarus

== Results ==
Legend

- F — Won by fall
- WO — Won by walkover

=== Final ===
Final
Piotr Ianulov (MDA)	0
Vladislav Valiev (RUS)	4

=== Top half ===
Round of 32
Edgaras Voitechovskis (LTU)
Uri Kalashnikov (ISR)	WO

Round of 16
Mraz Dzhafarian (UKR)	0
Fatih Erdin (TUR)	10
Ville Heino (FIN)	12
Akhmed Aibuev (FRA)	1
Piotr Ianulov (MDA)	10
Mihai Palaghia (ROU)	2
Stefan Reichmuth (SUI)	9
Uri Kalashnikov (ISR)	9

Quarterfinals
Fatih Erdin (TUR)	8
Ville Heino (FIN)	0
Piotr Ianulov (MDA)	10
Uri Kalashnikov (ISR)	0

Semifinals
Fatih Erdin (TUR)	1
Piotr Ianulov (MDA)	2^{F}

=== Bottom half ===
Round of 32
Boris Makoev (SVK)	1
Sandro Aminashvili (GEO)	4
Ivars Samušonoks (LAT)	0
Myles Amine (SMR)	4
Hovhannes Mkhitaryan (ARM)	2
Georgios Savvoulidis (GRE)	4
Vladislav Valiev (RUS)	11
Ali Shabanau (BLR)	0
Radosław Marcinkiewicz (POL)	1
Svetoslav Dimitrov (BUL)	2
Naib Ilaldayev (SWE)	2
Taimuraz Friev (ESP)	6^{F}
Richárd Ligeti (HUN)	0
Murad Suleymanov (AZE)	5
Carmelo Lumia (ITA)	2
Ahmed Dudarov (GER)	13

Round of 16
Sandro Aminashvili (GEO)	2
Myles Amine (SMR)	3
Georgios Savvoulidis (GRE)	1
Vladislav Valiev (RUS)	3
Svetoslav Dimitrov (BUL)	3
Taimuraz Friev (ESP)	4
Murad Suleymanov (AZE)	10
Ahmed Dudarov (GER)	1

Quarterfinals
Myles Amine (SMR)	0
Vladislav Valiev (RUS)	5
Taimuraz Friev (ESP)	2
Murad Suleymanov (AZE)	7

Semifinals
Vladislav Valiev (RUS)	7
Murad Suleymanov (AZE)	0

=== Repechage ===
Repechage round 1
Ali Shabanau (BLR)	4
Georgios Savvoulidis (GRE)	0

Repechage round 2
Mihai Palaghia (ROU)	8
Uri Kalashnikov (ISR)	7
Ali Shabanau (BLR)	6
Myles Amine (SMR)	2

Bronze medal match
Mihai Palaghia (ROU)	2
Fatih Erdin (TUR)	8
Ali Shabanau (BLR)	11
Murad Suleymanov (AZE)	2
