= 2020 European Wrestling Championships – Men's freestyle 86 kg =

Wrestling competition

The men's freestyle 86 kg is a competition featured at the 2020 European Wrestling Championships, and was held in Rome, Italy on February 15 and February 16.

== Medalists ==
Gold	Artur Naifonov; Russia
Silver	Myles Amine; San Marino
Bronze	Rasul Tsikhayeu; Belarus
Bronze	Boris Makoev; Slovakia

== Results ==
Legend

- F — Won by fall
- WO — Won by walkover

=== Final ===
Final
Myles Amine (SMR)	0
Artur Naifonov (RUS)	4

=== Top half ===
Round of 32

Round of 16
Myles Amine (SMR)	10
Lars Schäfle (GER)	0
Illia Archaia (UKR)	5
Hovhannes Mkhitaryan (ARM)	7
Aron Caneva (ITA)	0
Georgios Savvoulidis (GRE)	7
Taimuraz Friev (ESP)	2
Rasul Tsikhayeu (BLR)	4

Quarterfinals
Myles Amine (SMR)	6
Hovhannes Mkhitaryan (ARM)	2
Georgios Savvoulidis (GRE)	0
Rasul Tsikhayeu (BLR)	7

Semifinals
Myles Amine (SMR)	2
Rasul Tsikhayeu (BLR)	1

=== Bottom half ===
Round of 32
Boris Makoev (SVK)	WO
Stefan Reichmuth (SUI)
Mihály Nagy (HUN)	4
Uri Kalashnikov (ISR)	3
Akhmed Magamaev (BUL)	0
Artur Naifonov (RUS)	5
Abubakr Abakarov (AZE)	10
Ivars Samušonoks (LAT)	0
Akhmed Aibuev (FRA)	4
Piotr Ianulov (MDA)	8
Radosław Marcinkiewicz (POL)	3
Ville Heino (FIN)	1

Round of 16
Fatih Erdin (TUR)	4
Dato Marsagishvili (GEO)	4
Boris Makoev (SVK)	10
Mihály Nagy (HUN)	0
Artur Naifonov (RUS)	8
Abubakr Abakarov (AZE)	2
Piotr Ianulov (MDA)	1
Radosław Marcinkiewicz (POL)	3

Quarterfinals
Dato Marsagishvili (GEO)	2
Boris Makoev (SVK)	2
Artur Naifonov (RUS)	10
Radosław Marcinkiewicz (POL)	0

Semifinals
Boris Makoev (SVK)	0
Artur Naifonov (RUS)	3

=== Repechage ===
Repechage round 1
Akhmed Magamaev (BUL)	4
Abubakr Abakarov (AZE)	4

Repechage round 2
Lars Schäfle (GER)	7
Hovhannes Mkhitaryan (ARM)	2
Akhmed Magamaev (BUL)	4
Radosław Marcinkiewicz (POL)	1

Bronze medal match
Lars Schäfle (GER)	4
Rasul Tsikhayeu (BLR)	5
Akhmed Magamaev (BUL)	6
Boris Makoev (SVK)	7

== Final standing ==
Rank	Athlete
1st place, gold medalist(s)	Artur Naifonov (RUS)
2nd place, silver medalist(s)	Myles Amine (SMR)
3rd place, bronze medalist(s)	Rasul Tsikhayeu (BLR)
3rd place, bronze medalist(s)	Boris Makoev (SVK)
5	Lars Schäfle (GER)
5	Akhmed Magamaev (BUL)
7	Radosław Marcinkiewicz (POL)
8	Abubakr Abakarov (AZE)
9	Hovhannes Mkhitaryan (ARM)
10	Piotr Ianulov (MDA)
11	Dato Marsagishvili (GEO)
12	Georgios Savvoulidis (GRE)
13	Mihály Nagy (HUN)
14	Illia Archaia (UKR)
15	Fatih Erdin (TUR)
16	Akhmed Aibuev (FRA)
17	Uri Kalashnikov (ISR)
18	Taimuraz Friev (ESP)
19	Ville Heino (FIN)
20	Stefan Reichmuth (SUI)
21	Aron Caneva (ITA)
22	Ivars Samušonoks (LAT)
