= 2013 European Wrestling Championships – Men's freestyle 84 kg =

The men's freestyle 84 kg is a competition featured at the 2013 European Wrestling Championships, and was held at the Tbilisi Sports Palace in Tbilisi, Georgia on 22 March 2013.

== Medalists ==
Gold	Dato Marsagishvili; Georgia
Silver	Musa Murtazaliev; Armenia
Bronze	Ibragim Aldatov; Ukraine
Bronze	Anzor Urishev; Russia

== Results ==
Legend

- F — Won by fall

=== Final ===
Final
Musa Murtazaliev (ARM)	0	0
Dato Marsagishvili (GEO)	2	2

=== Top Half ===
Round of 32

Round of 16
Armands Zvirbulis (LAT)	2	2
Hakkı Ceylan (TUR)	0	0
Piotr Ianulov (MDA)	1	1
Taimuraz Friev (ESP)	0	1
Ibragim Aldatov (UKR)	0	4	3
Magomedgadzhi Khatiyev (AZE)	2	1	0
Michal Bodnár (SVK)	0	0
Musa Murtazaliev (ARM)	3	7

Quarterfinals
Armands Zvirbulis (LAT)	0	1
Piotr Ianulov (MDA)	2	2
Ibragim Aldatov (UKR)	0	3	1
Musa Murtazaliev (ARM)	3	0	2

Semifinals
Piotr Ianulov (MDA)	1	0	1
Musa Murtazaliev (ARM)	0	1	1

=== Bottom Half ===
Round of 32
Andrei Franț (ROU)	3	2
Meelis Sillat (EST)	0	0
Murad Gaidarov (BLR)	1	0	4
Anthony Fasugba (ITA)	0	1	0
Radoslaw Marcinkiewicz (POL)	2	2
Timofei Xenidis (GRE)	0	0
István Veréb (HUN)	1	0
Anzor Urishev (RUS)	2	6
Ivan Deliverski (BUL)	0	0
Georg Seregelyi (GER)	7	1

Round of 16
Dato Marsagishvili (GEO)	7	6
Dominic Peter (AUT)	0	0
Marco Riesen (SUI)	1	0
Andrei Franț (ROU)	4	1
Murad Gaidarov (BLR)	2	0	1
Radoslaw Marcinkiewicz (POL)	0	1	0
Anzor Urishev (RUS)	1	4
Georg Seregelyi (GER)	0	0

Quarterfinals
Dato Marsagishvili (GEO)	1	6
Andrei Franț (ROU)	0	0
Murad Gaidarov (BLR)	1	0
Anzor Urishev (RUS)	1	1

Semifinals
Dato Marsagishvili (GEO)	1	4
Anzor Urishev (RUS)	0	2

=== Repechage ===
Repechage round 2
Michal Bodnár (SVK)	0	1
Ibragim Aldatov (UKR)	5	5
Dominic Peter (AUT)	0	0
Andrei Franț (ROU)	2	1

Bronze medals
Ibragim Aldatov (UKR)	4	3
Piotr Ianulov (MDA)	0	0
Andrei Franț (ROU)	0	0
Anzor Urishev (RUS)	8	6
