= 2014 European Wrestling Championships – Men's freestyle 86 kg =

Wrestling competitions

The men's freestyle 86 kg is a competition featured at the 2014 European Wrestling Championships, and was held in Vantaa, Finland on April 4.

== Medalists ==
| Gold | Abdulrashid Sadulaev; Russia |
| Silver | Murad Gaidarov; Belarus |
| Bronze | Musa Murtazaliev; Armenia |
| Bronze | István Veréb; Hungary |

== Results ==
Legend

- F — Won by fall

=== Final ===
| Final |
| Murad Gaidarov (BLR) | 2 |
| Abdulrashid Sadulaev (RUS) | 5 |

=== Top half ===
Round of 32

Round of 16
Murad Gaidarov (BLR) | 14
Alexander Dolly (IRL) | 3
Lyubomir Sagaliuk (UKR) | 15
Miroslav Geshev (BUL) | 4
René Matejov (SVK) | 1
Musa Murtazaliev (ARM) | 7
Timofei Xenidis (GRE) | 11
Michael Tsotselashvili (ISR) | 0

Quarterfinals
Murad Gaidarov (BLR) | 10
Lyubomir Sagaliuk (UKR) | 6
Musa Murtazaliev (ARM) | 6
Timofei Xenidis (GRE) | 3

Semifinals
Murad Gaidarov (BLR) | 7
Musa Murtazaliev (ARM) | 2

=== Bottom half ===
Round of 32
Taimuraz Friev (ESP) | 12
Edon Shala (ALB) | 2
Fırat Binici (TUR) | 8
Akhmed Aibuev (FRA) | 0
Piotr Ianulov (MDA) | 4
Gamzat Osmanov (AZE) | 4
Gheorghiță Ștefan (ROU) | 2
Armands Zvirbulis (LAT) | 1
Abdulrashid Sadulaev (RUS) | 10
Sebastian Jezierzański (POL) | 0
Ville Heino (FIN) | 5
Georg Stark (GER) | 5
Dominic Peter (AUT) | 2
Dato Marsagishvili (GEO) | 6^{F}

Round of 16
István Veréb (HUN) | 5
Taimuraz Friev (ESP) | 2
Fırat Binici (TUR) | 0
Gamzat Osmanov (AZE) | 10
Gheorghiță Ștefan (ROU) | 1
Abdulrashid Sadulaev (RUS) | 14
Ville Heino (FIN) | 0
Dato Marsagishvili (GEO) | 11

Quarterfinals
István Veréb (HUN) | 4
Gamzat Osmanov (AZE) | 1
Abdulrashid Sadulaev (RUS) | 11
Dato Marsagishvili (GEO) | 0

Semifinals
István Veréb (HUN) | 0
Abdulrashid Sadulaev (RUS) | 10

=== Repechage ===
Repechage round 1
Sebastian Jezierzański (POL) | 7^{F}
Gheorghiță Ștefan (ROU) | 0

Repechage round 2
Alex Dolly (IRL) | 6
Lyubomir Sagaliuk (UKR) | 0
Sebastian Jezierzański (POL) | 4
Dato Marsagishvili (GEO) | 11

Bronze medals
Alex Dolly (IRL) | 6
Musa Murtazaliev (ARM) | 6
István Veréb (HUN) | 5^{F}
Dato Marsagishvili (GEO) | 5
