= Golden Grand Prix Ivan Yarygin 2018 – Men's freestyle 86 kg =

The men's freestyle 86 kg is a competition featured at the Golden Grand Prix Ivan Yarygin 2018, and was held in Krasnoyarsk, Russia, on 28 January.

== Medalists ==
Gold	(United States) David Taylor
Silver	(Turkey) Fatih Erdin
Bronze	(North Ossetia–Alania) Artur Naifonov
Bronze	(North Ossetia–Alania) Vladislav Valiev

== Results ==
Legend

- F — Won by fall

=== Final ===
Final
(United States) David Taylor	6^{F}
(Turkey) Fatih Erdin	2

=== Top half ===
- qualification: Alikhan Dzhabrailov of Chechnya vs Artur Naifonov of North Ossetia-Alania def. (0–3)
- qualification: Dauren Kurugliev of Dagestan def Soslan Ktsoev of North Ossetia-Alania (7–0)

==== Section 1 ====
Round of 16

Round of 8
(United States) David Taylor	4
(Cuba) Yurieski Torreblanca	4
(Georgia (country)) Sandro Aminashvili	1
(Turkey) Koloi Kartoev	6
(China) Zushen Lin	0
(North Ossetia–Alania) Artur Naifonov	10
(Dagestan) Dauren Kurugliev	6
(Mongolia) Gankhuyag Ganbaatar	0

Quarterfinals
(United States) David Taylor	4
(Turkey) Koloi Kartoev	1
(North Ossetia–Alania) Artur Naifonov	3
(Dagestan) Dauren Kurugliev	2

Semifinals
(United States) David Taylor	14^{F}
(North Ossetia–Alania) Artur Naifonov	4

=== Bottom half ===
==== Section 2 ====
Round of 16
(United States) Travis Stefanik	0
(Mongolia) Pürevjavyn Önörbat	4^{F}
(Uzbekistan) Javrail Shapiev	4
(Finland) Ville Heino	3
(Mongolia) Orgodolyn Üitümen	4
(North Ossetia–Alania) Vladislav Valiev	8

Round of 8
(Ukraine) Rustam Dudaiev	1
(Kazakhstan) Almas Zhunis	7
(Turkey) Fatih Erdin	10
(Georgia (country)) Zaur Beradze	0
(Turkmenistan) Selimmuhammet Muhadyyv	0
(Mongolia) Pürevjavyn Önörbat	10
(Uzbekistan) Javrail Shapiev	0
(North Ossetia–Alania) Vladislav Valiev	10

Quarterfinals
(Kazakhstan) Almas Zhunis	1
(Turkey) Fatih Erdin	6
(Mongolia) Pürevjavyn Önörbat	0
(North Ossetia–Alania) Vladislav Valiev	8

Semifinals
(Turkey) Fatih Erdin	2^{R}
(North Ossetia–Alania) Vladislav Valiev	1

== Repechage ==
Repechage round 1
-
-
-
-

Repechage round 2
(Cuba) Yurieski Torreblanca	1
(Turkey) Koloi Kartoev	1
(Georgia (country)) Zaur Beradze	9
(Kazakhstan) Almas Zhunis	6

Bronze medals
(Cuba) Yurieski Torreblanca	1
(North Ossetia–Alania) Artur Naifonov	2
(Georgia (country)) Zaur Beradze	0
(North Ossetia–Alania) Vladislav Valiev	2
