= Russian National Freestyle 2017 – Men's freestyle 86 kg =

The men's freestyle 86 kg is a competition featured at the 2017 Russian National Freestyle Wrestling Championships, and was held in Nazran, Ingushetia, Russia on June 14.

== Medalists ==
Gold	(North Ossetia–Alania) Vladislav Valiev
Silver	(Dagestan) Shamil Kudiyamagomedov
Bronze	(Krasnoyarsk Krai) Anzor Urishev
Bronze	(Dagestan) Arsen-Ali Musalaliev

== Results ==
Legend

- F — Won by fall
- R — Retired
- WO — Won by walkover (bye)

=== Finals ===
Semifinals
(North Ossetia–Alania) Vladislav Valiev	4
(Dagestan) Shamil Kudiyamagomedov	1

Semifinals: Shamil Kudiyamagomedov def. Anzor Urishev 2–1

=== Top half ===
Round of 32
(Dagestan) Dauren Kurugliev	1
(Dagestan) Arsen-Ali Musalaliev	1
(Buryatia) Aleksey Sabidaev	1
(Republic of Crimea (Russia)) Azamat Zakuev	4
(Kemerovo Oblast) Nikita Kinstler	10
(Tula Oblast) Suleiman Omarov	0
(Sakha Republic) Nuyrgun Sergin	1
(Chechnya) Muslim Dadaev	8
(Moscow) Islam Garunov	1
(Dagestan) Magomed Kurbanov	8
(Saint Petersburg) Soslan Khumarov	2
(North Ossetia–Alania) Vladislav Valiev	13
(Tatarstan) Umakhan Magomedkhanov	10
(North Ossetia–Alania) Ermak Kardanov	0
(Dagestan) Alikhan Dzhabrailov	10
(Dagestan) Muslim Magomedov	0

Round of 16
(Dagestan) Arsen-Ali Musalaliev	5
(Republic of Crimea (Russia)) Azamat Zakuev	2
(Kemerovo Oblast) Nikita Kinstler	6
(Chechnya) Muslim Dadaev	10
(Dagestan) Magomed Kurbanov	2
(North Ossetia–Alania) Vladislav Valiev	8
(Tatarstan) Umakhan Magomedkhanov	2
(Dagestan) Alikhan Dzhabrailov	4

Quarterfinals
(Dagestan) Arsen-Ali Musalaliev	10
(Chechnya) Muslim Dadaev	0
(North Ossetia–Alania) Vladislav Valiev	11
(Dagestan) Alikhan Dzhabrailov	0

Semifinals
(Dagestan) Arsen-Ali Musalaliev	1
(North Ossetia–Alania) Vladislav Valiev	2

=== Bottom half ===
==== Section 1 ====
Round of 64

Round of 32
(North Ossetia–Alania) Soslan Ktsoev	7
(Dagestan) Khabib Gadzhiev	2^{R}
(Chechnya) Zelimkhan Minkailov	7
(Tatarstan) Zubair-Khadzhi Eselaev	0
(Dagestan) Shamil Kudiyamagomedov	13
(Krasnoyarsk Krai) Aleksandr Zelenkov	2
(Khanty-Mansi Autonomous Okrug) Artur Naifonov	4
(North Ossetia–Alania) Zaur Makiev	1

Round of 16
(North Ossetia–Alania) Soslan Ktsoev	3
(Chechnya) Zelimkhan Minkailov	1
(Dagestan) Shamil Kudiyamagomedov	11
(Khanty-Mansi Autonomous Okrug) Artur Naifonov	4

Quarterfinals
(North Ossetia–Alania) Soslan Ktsoev	3
(Dagestan) Shamil Kudiyamagomedov	7
Third place
(Dagestan) Shamil Kudiyamagomedov	2
(Krasnoyarsk Krai) Anzor Urishev	2

==== Section 2 ====
Round of 64
(Khanty-Mansi Autonomous Okrug) Radik Nartikoev	WO
(Leningrad Oblast) Magasharip Ibragimov
(Krasnoyarsk Krai) Anzor Urishev	10
(Voronezh Oblast) Aleksandr Kondratov	0
(Dagestan) Saigidpasha Yusupov
(Dagestan) Abdul-Bek Ibragimov	WO
(Ingushetia) Adam Gagiev
(Moscow Oblast) Mger Kochoyan	WO
(Krasnoyarsk Krai) Artur Khachaturyan	WO
(Dagestan) Kanzula Magomedov

Round of 32
(Dagestan) Magomedsaid Ibragimov	7
(Sakhalin Oblast) Shamil Abdurakhmanov	11
(Moscow) Akhmed Magamaev	7
(Leningrad Oblast) Magasharip Ibragimov	6
(Krasnoyarsk Krai) Anzor Urishev	8
(Dagestan) Saigidpasha Yusupov	2
(Ingushetia) Adam Gagiev	5
(Dagestan) Kanzula Magomedov	3

Round of 16
(Sakhalin Oblast) Shamil Abdurakhmanov	9
(Moscow) Akhmed Magamaev	14
(Krasnoyarsk Krai) Anzor Urishev	10
(Ingushetia) Adam Gagiev	5

Quarterfinals
(Moscow) Akhmed Magamaev	1
(Krasnoyarsk Krai) Anzor Urishev	3

=== Repechage ===
Repechage round 1
(Krasnoyarsk Krai) Aleksandr Zelenkov	1
(Khanty-Mansi Autonomous Okrug) Artur Naifonov	6
(Saint Petersburg) Soslan Khumarov	0
(Dagestan) Magomed Kurbanov	7

Repechage round 2
(Khanty-Mansi Autonomous Okrug) Artur Naifonov	3
(North Ossetia–Alania) Soslan Ktsoev	5
(Dagestan) Magomed Kurbanov	4
(Dagestan) Alikhan Dzhabrailov	8

Bronze medals
(North Ossetia–Alania) Soslan Ktsoev	2
(Krasnoyarsk Krai) Anzor Urishev	3
(Dagestan) Alikhan Dzhabrailov	6
(Dagestan) Arsen-Ali Musalaliev	6^{F}
