= Golden Grand Prix Ivan Yarygin 2017 – Men's freestyle 86 kg =

The men's freestyle 86 kg is a competition featured at the Golden Grand Prix Ivan Yarygin 2017, and was held in Krasnoyarsk, Russia on January 28.

== Medalists ==
Gold	(Dagestan) Dauren Kurugliev
Silver	(Iran) Javad Mohammad Ebrahimi
Bronze	(North Ossetia–Alania) Vladislav Valiev
Bronze	(Chechnya) Akhmed Magamaev

== Results ==
Legend

- F — Won by fall
- D — Won by disqualification

=== Final ===
Final
(Iran) Javad Mohammad Ebrahimi	3
(Dagestan) Dauren Kurugliev	4

=== Top half ===
Round of 32

Round of 16
(Dagestan) Shamil Kudiyamagomedov	11
(Krasnoyarsk Krai) Eduard Arutunyan	0
(Mongolia) Nyambayar Baatar	0
(Iran) Javad Mohammad Ebrahimi	11
(Chechnya) Muslim Dadaev	5
(Kazakhstan) Timur Oskenbaev	1
(Buryatia) Alexey Sabidaev	4
(North Ossetia–Alania) Vladislav Valiev	6

Quarterfinals
(Dagestan) Shamil Kudiyamagomedov	4
(Iran) Javad Mohammad Ebrahimi	4
(Chechnya) Muslim Dadaev	2
(North Ossetia–Alania) Vladislav Valiev	4

Semifinals
(Iran) Javad Mohammad Ebrahimi	3
(North Ossetia–Alania) Vladislav Valiev	2

=== Bottom half ===
Round of 32
(North Ossetia–Alania) Artur Naifonov	1
(Chechnya) Akhmed Magamaev	6
(Dagestan) Zelimkhan Minkailov	2
(Krasnoyarsk Krai) Aleksander Zelenkov	4
(North Ossetia–Alania) Batyrbek Tsakulov	5
(China) Altangalida	1
(Dagestan) Arsen-Ali Musalaliev	11
(Kemerovo Oblast) Nikita Kinstler	0
(Kabardino-Balkaria) Anzor Urishev	3
(Dagestan) Akhmed Magomedov	3

Round of 16
(Dagestan) Dauren Kurugliev	10
(Moscow Oblast) Ashab Geriev	0
(Mongolia) Purovzhav Unurbat	0
(Chechnya) Akhmed Magamaev	1
(Krasnoyarsk Krai) Aleksander Zelenkov	8
(North Ossetia–Alania) Batyrbek Tsakulov	2
(Dagestan) Arsen-Ali Musalaliev	6
(Dagestan) Akhmed Magomedov	0

Quarterfinals
(Dagestan) Dauren Kurugliev	3
(Chechnya) Akhmed Magamaev	0
(Krasnoyarsk Krai) Aleksander Zelenkov	5
(Dagestan) Arsen-Ali Musalaliev	1

Semifinals
(Dagestan) Dauren Kurugliev	5
(Krasnoyarsk Krai) Aleksander Zelenkov	0

=== Repechage ===
Repechage round 1
-
-
-
-

Repechage round 2
(Mongolia) Nyambayar Baatar	0^{D}
(Dagestan) Shamil Kudiyamagomedov	6
(Moscow Oblast) Askhab Geriev	2
(Chechnya) Akhmed Magamaev	5

Bronze medals
(Dagestan) Shamil Kudiyamagomedov	0
(North Ossetia–Alania) Vladislav Valiev	7
(Chechnya) Akhmed Magamaev	10
(Krasnoyarsk Krai) Aleksander Zelenkov	0
