= 2013 World Wrestling Championships – Men's freestyle 84 kg =

Men's freestyle 84 kg at the 2013 World Championships
- Venue: László Papp Budapest Sports Arena
- Dates: 17 September 2013
- Competitors: 37 from 37 nations

Medalists
| gold medal | Ibragim Aldatov | Ukraine |
| silver medal | Reineris Salas | Cuba |
| bronze medal | István Veréb | Hungary |
| bronze medal | Ehsan Lashgari | Iran |

The men's freestyle 84 kilograms is a competition featured at the 2013 World Wrestling Championships, and was held at the László Papp Budapest Sports Arena in Budapest, Hungary on 17 September 2013.

== Results ==
Legend

- C — Won by 3 cautions given to the opponent
- F — Won by fall
- R — Retired

=== Finals ===
| Semifinals | | Final |
| Ibragim Aldatov (UKR) | 6 |
| Murad Gaidarov (BLR) | 0 | Ibragim Aldatov (UKR) | 8 |
| Taimuraz Friev (ESP) | 1 | Reineris Salas (CUB) | 1 |
| Reineris Salas (CUB) | 5 |

=== Top half ===
==== Section 1 ====
Round of 64

Round of 32
Piotr Ianulov (MDA) | 4
Musa Murtazaliev (ARM) | 4
Dejan Bogdanov (MKD) | 0^{R}
Marco Riesen (SUI) | 3
José Daniel Díaz (VEN) | 7
István Veréb (HUN) | 6^{C}
Ibragim Aldatov (UKR) | 8
Jevgeni Soltruk (EST) | 0

Round of 16
Musa Murtazaliev (ARM) | 9
Marco Riesen (SUI) | 4
István Veréb (HUN) | 1
Ibragim Aldatov (UKR) | 6

Quarterfinals
Musa Murtazaliev (ARM) | 11
Ibragim Aldatov (UKR) | 13

==== Section 2 ====
Round of 64

Round of 32
Murad Gaidarov (BLR) | 9
Lee Jae-sung (KOR) | 1
Aleksandr Gostiyev (AZE) | 6
Aslan Kakhidze (KAZ) | 4
Jaime Espinal (PUR) | 0
Gheorghiță Ștefan (ROU) | 4
Orgodolyn Üitümen (MGL) | 8
Armands Zvirbulis (LAT) | 1

Round of 16
Murad Gaidarov (BLR) | 4
Aleksandr Gostiyev (AZE) | 1
Gheorghiță Ștefan (ROU) | 1
Orgodolyn Üitümen (MGL) | 4

Quarterfinals
Murad Gaidarov (BLR) | 7
Orgodolyn Üitümen (MGL) | 4

=== Bottom half ===
==== Section 3 ====
Round of 64

Round of 32
Zhang Feng (CHN) | 9
Pawan Kumar (IND) | 8
Tamerlan Tagziev (CAN) | 6
Taimuraz Friev (ESP) | 7
Shinya Matsumoto (JPN) | 0
Serdar Böke (TUR) | 8
Luis Miguel Pérez (DOM) | 2
Maciej Balawender (POL) | 10

Round of 16
Zhang Feng (CHN) | 0
Taimuraz Friev (ESP) | 8
Serdar Böke (TUR) | 12
Maciej Balawender (POL) | 5

Quarterfinals
Taimuraz Friev (ESP) | 9
Serdar Böke (TUR) | 0

==== Section 4 ====
Round of 64
Kelvin Joseph (NZL) | 0
Gabriel Seregelyi (GER) | 8
Michael Tsotsiashvili (ISR) | 2
Keith Gavin (USA) | 9
Nikolay Paslar (BUL) | 0
Dato Marsagishvili (GEO) | 5
Shamil Kudiyamagomedov (RUS) | 8
Adrian Jaoude (BRA) | 0
Ehsan Lashgari (IRI) | 8
Juan Esteban Martínez (COL) | 0

Round of 32
Reineris Salas (CUB) | 8
Zaurbek Sokhiev (UZB) | 0
Timofei Xenidis (GRE) | 3
Gabriel Seregelyi (GER) | 4
Keith Gavin (USA) | 0
Dato Marsagishvili (GEO) | 8
Shamil Kudiyamagomedov (RUS) | 0
Ehsan Lashgari (IRI) | 7

Round of 16
Reineris Salas (CUB) | 5
Gabriel Seregelyi (GER) | 3
Dato Marsagishvili (GEO) | 3
Ehsan Lashgari (IRI) | 8^{F}

Quarterfinals
Reineris Salas (CUB) | 9
Ehsan Lashgari (IRI) | 6

=== Repechage ===
Repechage round 2
Jevgeni Soltruk (EST) | 0
István Veréb (HUN) | 8
Zaurbek Sokhiev (UZB) | 10
Gabriel Seregelyi (GER) | 3

Repechage round 3
István Veréb (HUN) | 3^{C}
Musa Murtazaliev (ARM) | 1
Zaurbek Sokhiev (UZB) | 2
Ehsan Lashgari (IRI) | 9

Bronze medals
István Veréb (HUN) | 2
Murad Gaidarov (BLR) | 1
Ehsan Lashgari (IRI) | 6
Taimuraz Friev (ESP) | 4
