= Wrestling at the 2015 European Games – Men's freestyle 86 kg =

Men's freestyle 86 kg at the 2015 European Games
- Venue: Heydar Aliyev Arena
- Date: 18 June
- Competitors: 24 from 24 nations

Medalists
gold medal	Abdulrashid Sadulaev	Russia
silver medal	Piotr Ianulov	Moldova
bronze medal	Radosław Marcinkiewicz	Poland
bronze medal	Sandro Aminashvili	Georgia

Men's freestyle 86 kg competition at the 2015 European Games in Baku, Azerbaijan, took place on 18 June at the Heydar Aliyev Arena.

== Schedule ==
All times are Azerbaijan Summer Time (UTC+05:00)

Date	Time	Event
Tuesday, 18 June 2015	11:00	1/8 finals
Tuesday, 18 June 2015	13:00	Quarterfinals
Tuesday, 18 June 2015	13:00	Semifinals
Tuesday, 18 June 2015	15:00	Repechage
Tuesday, 18 June 2015	19:00	Finals

== Results ==
Legend

=== Final ===
Final
Abdulrashid Sadulaev (RUS)	11
Piotr Ianulov (MDA)	0

=== Top half ===
Qualifications

1/8 finals
Nurmaqomed Qadjiyev (AZE)	14
Georgi Sredkov (BUL)	2
Tudor Vasile Ziz (ITA)	0
Abdulrashid Sadulaev (RUS)	10
Radosław Marcinkiewicz (POL)	4
Halil Zubairov (MKD)	2
Timofei Xenidis (GRE)	8
Akhmed Aibuev (FRA)	10

Quarterfinals
Nurmaqomed Qadjiyev (AZE)	1
Abdulrashid Sadulaev (RUS)	11
Radosław Marcinkiewicz (POL)	8
Akhmed Aibuev (FRA)	1

Semifinals
Abdulrashid Sadulaev (RUS)	10
Radosław Marcinkiewicz (POL)	0

=== Bottom half ===
Qualifications
Ahmet Bilici (TUR)	4
Musa Murtazaliev (ARM)	5
Taimuraz Friev (ESP)	11
Alex Dolly (IRL)	0
Dmytro Rochniak (UKR)	11
Michael Kaufmehl (GER)	4
Sandro Aminashvili (GEO)	8
Gheorghiță Ștefan (ROU)	0
Ville Heino (FIN)	1
Piotr Ianulov (MDA)	5
Aliaksandr Hushtyn (BLR)	10
Vratislav Chotaš (CZE)	0
Armands Zvirbulis (LAT)	10
Dominic Peter (AUT)	0
Marco Riesen (SUI)	2
István Veréb (HUN)	7

1/8 finals
Musa Murtazaliev (ARM)	3
Taimuraz Friev (ESP)	2
Dmytro Rochniak (UKR)	1
Sandro Aminashvili (GEO)	8
Piotr Ianulov (MDA)	8
Aliaksandr Hushtyn (BLR)	0
Armands Zvirbulis (LAT)	2
István Veréb (HUN)	5

Quarterfinals
Musa Murtazaliev (ARM)	1
Sandro Aminashvili (GEO)	4
Piotr Ianulov (MDA)	8
István Veréb (HUN)	1

Semifinals
Sandro Aminashvili (GEO)	3
Piotr Ianulov (MDA)	5

=== Repechage ===
Repechage round 1
Ville Heino (FIN)	5
Aliaksandr Hushtyn (BLR)	8

Repechage round 2
Tudor Vasile Ziz (ITA)	0
Nurmaqomed Qadjiyev (AZE)	10
Aliaksandr Hushtyn (BLR)	1
István Veréb (HUN)	5

Bronze medal match
Nurmaqomed Qadjiyev (AZE)	3
Radosław Marcinkiewicz (POL)	5
István Veréb (HUN)	2
Sandro Aminashvili (GEO)	3
