= 2011 Dan Kolov & Nikola Petrov Tournament =

Dan Kolov & Nikola Petrov 2011
- Host city: Burgas, Bulgaria
- Dates: 25–27 February

Champions
- Freestyle: Bulgaria
- Greco-Roman: Bulgaria
- Women: Bulgaria

The 49th Dan Kolov & Nikola Petrov Tournament was a sport wrestling event held in Sofia, Bulgaria between 25 and 27 February 2011.

This international tournament includes competition in both men's and women's freestyle wrestling and men's Greco-Roman wrestling. This tournament is held in honor of Dan Kolov who was the first European freestyle wrestling champion from Bulgaria and European and World Champion Nikola Petroff.

== Medal table ==
Rank	Nation	Gold	Silver	Bronze	Total
1	Bulgaria	9	5	8	22
2	Turkey	3	3	5	11
3	Romania	3	2	0	5
4	Azerbaijan	2	1	5	8
5	United States	1	2	5	8
6	Greece	1	1	1	3
7	Moldova	1	0	1	2
8	Senegal	1	0	0	1
9	Tunisia	0	2	3	5
10	Ukraine	0	2	0	2
11	Georgia	0	1	4	5
12	Russia	0	1	1	2
13	Poland	0	1	0	1
14	South Korea	0	0	2	2
14	Switzerland	0	0	2	2
16	Japan	0	0	1	1
16	Spain	0	0	1	1
Totals (17 entries)		21	21	39	81

== Medal overview ==
=== Men's freestyle ===
Event	Gold	Silver	Bronze
55 kg	Namiq Sovdumzade; Azerbaijan	Vladislav Petrov; Russia	Radoslav Velikov; Bulgaria
55 kg	Namiq Sovdumzade; Azerbaijan	Vladislav Petrov; Russia	Yashar Aliyev; Azerbaijan
60 kg	George Bucur; Romania	Khaibulla Shaalov; Azerbaijan	Ismail Emin Redzhep; Bulgaria
60 kg	George Bucur; Romania	Khaibulla Shaalov; Azerbaijan	Anatolie Guidea; Bulgaria
66 kg	Leonid Bazan; Bulgaria	Georgi Zlatov; Ukraine	Nikolay Kurtev; Bulgaria
66 kg	Leonid Bazan; Bulgaria	Georgi Zlatov; Ukraine	Kōtarō Tanaka; Japan
74 kg	Agil Guliev; Azerbaijan	Kiril Terziev; Bulgaria	Muhammed İlkhan; Turkey
74 kg	Agil Guliev; Azerbaijan	Kiril Terziev; Bulgaria	İbrahim Yusubov; Azerbaijan
84 kg	Lyuben Iliev; Bulgaria	Maciej Balawender; Poland	Fırat Binici; Turkey
84 kg	Lyuben Iliev; Bulgaria	Maciej Balawender; Poland	Ilya Khakimkoev; Azerbaijan
96 kg	Nicolai Ceban; Moldova	Gyurai Hamdiev; Bulgaria	Aslanbek Alborov; Azerbaijan
96 kg	Nicolai Ceban; Moldova	Gyurai Hamdiev; Bulgaria	Krasimir Kochev; Bulgaria
120 kg	Nikolay Shterev; Bulgaria	Petr Raichev; Ukraine	Aslan Dzebishov; Azerbaijan
120 kg	Nikolay Shterev; Bulgaria	Petr Raichev; Ukraine	Jose Vazquez; Spain

=== Greco-Roman ===
Event	Gold	Silver	Bronze
55 kg	Aleksandar Kostadinov; Bulgaria	Venelin Venkov; Bulgaria	Victor Ciobanu; Moldova
55 kg	Aleksandar Kostadinov; Bulgaria	Venelin Venkov; Bulgaria	Bayram Garip; Turkey
60 kg	Ivo Angelov; Bulgaria	Uğur Tüfenk; Turkey	Oleg Drozdo; Russia
60 kg	Ivo Angelov; Bulgaria	Uğur Tüfenk; Turkey	Ryu Han-su; South Korea
66 kg	Yunus Özel; Turkey	Georgian Carpen; Romania	Manuchar Turmanidze; Georgia
66 kg	Yunus Özel; Turkey	Georgian Carpen; Romania	Antoni Mamageishvili; Georgia
74 kg	Ionel Puscasu; Romania	Manuchar Kvirkvelia; Georgia	Ilian Georgiev; Bulgaria
74 kg	Ionel Puscasu; Romania	Manuchar Kvirkvelia; Georgia	Nae-Koo Kang; South Korea
84 kg	Hristo Marinov; Bulgaria	Haykel Achouri; Tunisia	Chad Gable; United States
84 kg	Hristo Marinov; Bulgaria	Haykel Achouri; Tunisia	Aslan Atem; Turkey
96 kg	Elis Guri; Bulgaria	Georgios Koutsioumpas; Greece	Justin Ruiz; United States
96 kg	Elis Guri; Bulgaria	Georgios Koutsioumpas; Greece	Soso Jabidze; Georgia
120 kg	Xenofon Koutsioubas; Greece	Bayram Nigar; Turkey	Ivan Ivanov; Bulgaria
120 kg	Xenofon Koutsioubas; Greece	Bayram Nigar; Turkey	Dimitri Javakhishvili; Georgia

=== Women's freestyle ===
Event	Gold	Silver	Bronze
48 kg	Burcu Kebiç; Turkey	Sümeyye Zeybek; Turkey	Gratsiela Dragoeva; Bulgaria
48 kg	Burcu Kebiç; Turkey	Sümeyye Zeybek; Turkey	Maroi Mezien; Tunisia
51 kg	Isabelle Sambou; Senegal	Sara Fulp-Allen; United States	Nadine Tokar; Switzerland
55 kg	Hafize Şahin; Turkey	Sharon Jacobson; United States	Marwa Amri; Tunisia
55 kg	Hafize Şahin; Turkey	Sharon Jacobson; United States	Katherine Shai; United States
59 kg	Georgiana Filip; Romania	Rim Ayari; Tunisia	Tamara Wittenwiler; Switzerland
59 kg	Georgiana Filip; Romania	Rim Ayari; Tunisia	Maria Prevolaraki; Greece
63 kg	Taybe Yusein; Bulgaria	Elina Vaseva; Bulgaria	Sabrine Trabelsi; Tunisia
63 kg	Taybe Yusein; Bulgaria	Elina Vaseva; Bulgaria	Othella Lucas; United States
67 kg	Adeline Gray; United States	Ralitza Ivanova; Bulgaria	Burcu Örskaya; Turkey
72 kg	Stanka Zlateva; Bulgaria	Ana Otvos; Romania	Iris Smith; United States

== Participating nations ==
291 competitors from 26 nations participated.

- Algeria (2)
- Azerbaijan (14)
- Bulgaria (71)
- Spain (6)
- France (10)
- United Kingdom (2)
- Georgia (8)
- Germany (2)
- Greece (8)
- Honduras (4)
- Israel (2)
- Jordan (3)
- Japan (15)
- South Korea (5)
- Macedonia (3)
- Moldova (13)
- Poland (7)
- Romania (23)
- Russia (11)
- Senegal (2)
- Serbia (3)
- Switzerland (8)
- Tunisia (13)
- Turkey (31)
- Ukraine (2)
- United States (24)
