= Russian National Freestyle 2016 – Men's freestyle 86 kg =

The men's freestyle 86 kg is a competition featured at the 2016 Russian National Freestyle Wrestling Championships, and was held in Yakutsk, Russia on May 28.

== Medalists ==
Gold	(Kabardino-Balkaria) Anzor Urishev
Silver	(Krasnoyarsk Krai) Aleksandr Zelenkov
Bronze	(North Ossetia–Alania) Vladislav Valiev
Bronze	(Sakhalin Oblast) Shamil Abdurakhmanov

== Results ==
Legend

- F — Won by fall
- R — Retired
- WO — Won by walkover

=== Finals ===
Final
(Kabardino-Balkaria) Anzor Urishev	5
(Krasnoyarsk Krai) Aleksandr Zelenkov	0

=== Top half ===
Round of 32
(Tatarstan) Umakhan Magomedkhanov	WO
(Dagestan) Arsen-Ali Musalaliev
(Dagestan) Daniyal Malikov
(Zabaykalsky Krai) Baras Bazarov	WO
(North Ossetia–Alania) Vladislav Valiev	WO
(Vologda Oblast) Ruslan Seferbekov
(Khanty-Mansi Autonomous Okrug) Radik Nartikoev	WO
(Dagestan) Dauren Kurugliev
(Kaliningrad Oblast) Vyacheslav Sugako
(Krasnodar Krai) Igor Sargsyan	WO
(Ingushetia) Magomed Kartoev
(Kabardino-Balkaria) Anzor Urishev	WO

Round of 16
(North Ossetia–Alania) Andrey Valiev	2
(Komi Republic) Tagir Davletov	0
(Tatarstan) Umakhan Magomedkhanov	3
(Zabaykalsky Krai) Baras Bazarov	0
(North Ossetia–Alania) Vladislav Valiev	2
(Khanty-Mansi Autonomous Okrug) Radik Nartikoev	2
(Krasnodar Krai) Igor Sargsyan	0
(Kabardino-Balkaria) Anzor Urishev	12

Quarterfinals
(North Ossetia–Alania) Andrey Valiev	6^{F}
(Tatarstan) Umakhan Magomedkhanov	5
(North Ossetia–Alania) Vladislav Valiev	0
(Kabardino-Balkaria) Anzor Urishev	3

Semifinals
(North Ossetia–Alania) Andrey Valiev	0
(Kabardino-Balkaria) Anzor Urishev	4

=== Bottom half ===
Round of 32
(North Ossetia–Alania) Georgii Rubaev	WO
(North Ossetia–Alania) Boris Makoev
(Moscow) Khabi Khashpakov	WO
(Moscow) Askhab Geriev
(Saint Petersburg) Makasharip Ibragimov	4
(Smolensk Oblast) Anton Vlasenkov	3
(Tula Oblast) Suleiman Omarov	WO
(Dagestan) Akhmed Magamaev
(Dagestan) Akhmed Magomedov	WO
(Dagestan) Gadzhi Radzhabov
(Voronezh Oblast) Zhamulat Medzhidov	WO
(Dagestan) Shamil Kudiyamagomedov
(Krasnoyarsk Krai) Aleksandr Zelenkov	14
(North Ossetia–Alania) Georgy Gogichaev	4
(Moscow) Albert Ikaev	1
(Sakhalin Oblast) Shamil Abdurakhmanov	3

Round of 16
(North Ossetia–Alania) Georgii Rubaev	10
(Moscow) Khabi Khashpakov	0
(Saint Petersburg) Makasharip Ibragimov	WO
(Tula Oblast) Suleiman Omarov
(Dagestan) Akhmed Magomedov
(Voronezh Oblast) Zhamulat Medzhidov	WO
(Krasnoyarsk Krai) Aleksandr Zelenkov	9
(Sakhalin Oblast) Shamil Abdurakhmanov	6

Quarterfinals
(North Ossetia–Alania) Georgii Rubaev	0
(Saint Petersburg) Makasharip Ibragimov	5
(Voronezh Oblast) Zhamulat Medzhidov	6
(Krasnoyarsk Krai) Aleksandr Zelenkov	14

Semifinals
(Saint Petersburg) Makasharip Ibragimov	2
(Krasnoyarsk Krai) Aleksandr Zelenkov	6

=== Repechage ===
Repechage round 1
(North Ossetia–Alania) Georgy Gogichaev	2^{R}
(Sakhalin Oblast) Shamil Abdurakhmanov	8
(Ingushetia) Magomed Kartoev	0
(Krasnodar Krai) Igor Sargsyan	4

Repechage round 2
(Sakhalin Oblast) Shamil Abdurakhmanov	10
(Voronezh Oblast) Zhamulat Medzhidov	0
(Krasnodar Krai) Igor Sargsyan	0
(North Ossetia–Alania) Vladislav Valiev	10

Bronze medals
(Sakhalin Oblast) Shamil Abdurakhmanov	6
(Saint Petersburg) Makasharip Ibragimov	3
(North Ossetia–Alania) Vladislav Valiev	6
(North Ossetia–Alania) Andrey Valiev	4
