= Rasul Tsikhayeu =

Belarusian freestyle wrestler

Personal information
- Native name: Расул Магамедавіч Ціхаеў

Sport
- Country: Belarus
- Sport: Amateur wrestling
- Weight class: 86 kg
- Event: Freestyle
Medal record
Men's freestyle wrestling
Representing Belarus
European Championships
Bronze medal – third place	2020 Rome	86 kg

Rasul Tsikhayeu is a Belarusian freestyle wrestler. He won one of the bronze medals in the 86 kg event at the 2020 European Wrestling Championships held in Rome, Italy.

== Career ==
In 2016, he competed at the European Olympic Qualification Tournament hoping to qualify for the 2016 Summer Olympics in Rio de Janeiro, Brazil. In 2020, he competed in the men's 86 kg event at the Individual Wrestling World Cup held in Belgrade, Serbia.

In 2021, he competed in the men's 86 kg event at the World Wrestling Championships held in Oslo, Norway where he was eliminated in his first match.

== Major results ==
Year	Tournament	Venue	Result	Event
2020	European Championships	Rome, Italy	3rd	Freestyle 86 kg
