= Anzor Urishev =

Russian wrestler (born 1987)

Personal information
- Full name: Anzor Suadinovich Urishev
- Nickname: The Silver Fox
- Born: January 23, 1987 (age 39) Kabardino-Balkaria, Russia
- Height: 1.77 m (5 ft 9 1/2 in)
- Weight: 86 kg (190 lb)

Sport
- Country: Russia
- Sport: Wrestling
- Event: Freestyle
- Club: SC Gladiator
- Coached by: Anzor Tembotov; Vladimir Modosyan (RUS)
Medal record
Men's freestyle wrestling
Representing Russia
World Cup
Silver medal – second place	2014 Los Angeles	86 kg
European Championships
Gold medal – first place	2010 Baku	84 kg
Gold medal – first place	2011 Dortmund	84 kg
Bronze medal – third place	2012 Belgrad	84 kg
Bronze medal – third place	2013 Tbilisi	84 kg
Golden Grand Prix Ivan Yarygin
Silver medal – second place	2018 Krasnoyarsk	92 kg
Gold medal – first place	2015 Krasnoyarsk	86 kg
Russian Championships
Silver medal – second place	2018 Odintsovo	92 kg
Bronze medal – third place	2017 Nazran	86 kg
Gold medal – first place	2016 Yakutsk	86 kg
- Updated on November 18, 2012

Anzor Suadinovich Urishev (Russian: Анзор Суадинович Уришев; born January 23, 1987) is a Russian former freestyle wrestler, who competed for the men's freestyle 84 kg at the 2012 Summer Olympics in London. He was eliminated in the quarterfinal rounds, after being defeated by Iran's Ehsan Lashgari, based on the technical score.

Urishev won gold medals each at the 2010 European Wrestling Championships in Baku, Azerbaijan, and at the 2011 European Wrestling Championships in Dortmund, Germany. He is also was a member of SC Gladiator in his hometown Nalchik and was coached and trained by Anzor Tembotov.
