= Shamil Kudiyamagomedov =

Russian wrestler (born 1993)

Personal information
- Native name: Шамиль Кудиямагомедов
- Full name: Shamil Magomedovich Kudiyamagomedov
- Nationality: Russian; Italian
- Born: May 9, 1993 (age 33) Kizlyar, Dagestan, Russia
- Weight: 86 kg (190 lb)

Sport
- Country: Russia (2011–2018); Italy (2018–2020)
- Sport: Wrestling
- Event: Freestyle
- Club: Sagid Murtazaliev wrestling academy Gamid Gamidov wrestling club
- Coached by: Anvar Magomedgadzhiev, Arsen Gitinov; Gaidar Gaidarov (main coach)
Medal record
Representing Russia
Men's Freestyle wrestling
European Championships
Gold medal – first place	2016 Riga	86 kg
World Cup
Silver medal – second place	2014 Los Angeles	86 kg
Silver medal – second place	2016 Los Angeles	86 kg
Summer Universiade
Silver medal – second place	2013 Kazan	84 kg
Golden Grand Prix Ivan Yarygin
Silver medal – second place	2014 Krasnoyarsk	86 kg
Gold medal – first place	2016 Krasnoyarsk	86 kg
Ramzan Kadyrov and Adlan Varayev Cup
Gold medal – first place	2014 Grozny	86 kg
Ali Aliyev memorial
Gold medal – first place	2012 Kaspiysk	84 kg
Gold medal – first place	2014 Makhachkala	86 kg
Gold medal – first place	2015 Kaspiysk	86 kg
Golden Grand Prix Baku
Gold medal – first place	2014 Baku	86 kg
Gold medal – first place	2016 Baku	86 kg
Military World Games
Gold medal – first place	2015 Mungyeong	86 kg
European Championships U23
Bronze medal – third place	2015 Wałbrzych	86 kg
Junior World Championships
Bronze medal – third place	2012 Pattaya	84 kg
Representing Italy
European Championships
Bronze medal – third place	2018 Kaspiysk	86 kg
Italian Championships
Gold medal – first place	2018 Rome	86 kg
Dan Kolov & Nikola Petrov
Bronze medal – third place	2018 Sofia	86 kg

Shamil Magomedovich Kudiyamagomedov (Russian: Шамиль Магомедович Кудиямагомедов, Italian: Šhamil Kudiyamagomedov; born 9 May 1993) is a Russian/naturalized Italian former amateur wrestler of Avar heritage, who claimed the European senior title (2016), Russian national champion (2013), Italian national champion (2018), 2013 Summer Universiade silver medalist in Kazan. International Master of Sports in Freestyle Wrestling.

== Career ==
Shamil is the 2012 Junior World Championships bronze medalist. He handed Abdulrashid Sadulaev his first senior loss in 2012. He competed in the freestyle 84 kg event at the 2013 World Wrestling Championships, after defeated Adrian Jaoude from Brazil in the round of 64, he was eliminated by Olympic bronze medalist Ehsan Lashgari of Iran in the round of 32. At the 2014 Memorial Heydar Aliyev (Golden Grand Prix Baku) in the rematch, he beat Ehsan Lashgari in the final match. At the 2015 U23 European Championships, he lost to his teammate of Magomedgadzhi Khatiyev in the semifinals, but went on to wrestle back and win a bronze medal against Fatih Erdin of Turkey. He won the gold medal in men's freestyle 86 kg at the 2015 Military World Games.

In 2016, he won European Championships. In 2020, Shamil announced his retirement.

== Championships and accomplishments ==
- Junior level:
  - 2012 Junior World Championships bronze medalist – 84 kg
- (Russia) Senior level:
  - 2012 Ali Aliyev Memorial – 84 kg
  - 2013 Russian Nationals – 86 kg
  - 2013 Kazan Summer Universiade 2013 runner-up – 84 kg
  - 2014 World Cup silver medalist – 86 kg
  - 2014 Russian Nationals runner-up – 86 kg
  - 2014 Golden Grand Prix Ivan Yarygin runner-up – 86 kg
  - 2014 Ali Aliyev Memorial - 86 kg
  - 2014 Ramzan Kadyrov Cup - 86 kg
  - 2014, 2016 Golden Grand-prix Baku - 86 kg
  - 2015 European Championships U23 bronze medalist – 86 kg
  - 2015 Russian Nationals runner-up – 86 kg
  - 2015 Ali Aliyev Memorial – 86 kg
  - 2015 Military World Games gold medalist – 86 kg
  - 2016 Golden Grand Prix Ivan Yarygin winner – 86 kg
  - 2016 European Wrestling Championships - gold medal – 86 kg
  - 2016 World Cup silver medalist – 86 kg
  - 2016 Military World Championship Gold Medalist – 86 kg
- (Italy) Senior level:
  - 2018 Italian National Freestyle Wrestling Championships – 86 kg
  - 2018 XXII Outstanding Ukrainian Wrestlers and Coaches Memorial 3rd – 86 kg
  - Dan Kolov & Nikola Petrov 3rd – 86 kg
  - 2018 European Wrestling Championships - bronze medalist – 86 kg
