= Fırat Binici =

Turkish freestyle wrestler and coach

Personal information
- Born: Narman, Erzurum, Turkey

Sport
- Country: Turkey
- Sport: Wrestling
- Event: Freestyle wrestling
Medal record
Men's freestyle wrestling
Representing Turkey
European Championships
Silver medal – second place	2009 Vilnius	74 kg

Fırat Binici is a Turkish former freestyle wrestler and wrestling coach. He competed at the 2009 European Wrestling Championships, winning the silver medal in the 74 kg event.
