= Ibragim Aldatov =

Ukrainian freestyle wrestler

Medal record

Men's Freestyle Wrestling

Representing Ukraine

World Championships
Gold medal – first place	2006 Guangzhou	74 kg
Gold medal – first place	2013 Budapest	84 kg
Silver medal – second place	2007 Baku	74 kg
Silver medal – second place	2011 Istanbul	84 kg
Bronze medal – third place	2009 Herning	84 kg

European Championships
Silver medal – second place	2009 Vilnius	84 kg
Bronze medal – third place	2013 Tbilisi	84 kg
Bronze medal – third place	2016 Riga	86 kg

Ibrahim Erikovych Aldatov (born November 4, 1983, in Beslan, North Ossetian ASSR, Russian SFSR) is a Russian freestyle wrestler of Ossetian heritage who represents Ukraine. He won a gold medal in the 2006 FILA Wrestling World Championships and 2013 FILA Wrestling World Championships and won medals at three other World Championships. He participated at the 2008 Summer Olympics and the 2012 Summer Olympics.
