= Ehsan Lashgari =

Iranian wrestler (born 1985)

Medal record

Men's freestyle wrestling

Representing Iran

Olympic Games
Bronze medal – third place	2012 London	84 kg

World Championships
Bronze medal – third place	2013 Budapest	84 kg

Asian Championships
Gold medal – first place	2009 Pattaya	84 kg
Gold medal – first place	2010 New Delhi	84 kg
Gold medal – first place	2012 Gumi	84 kg
Gold medal – first place	2016 Bangkok	86 kg

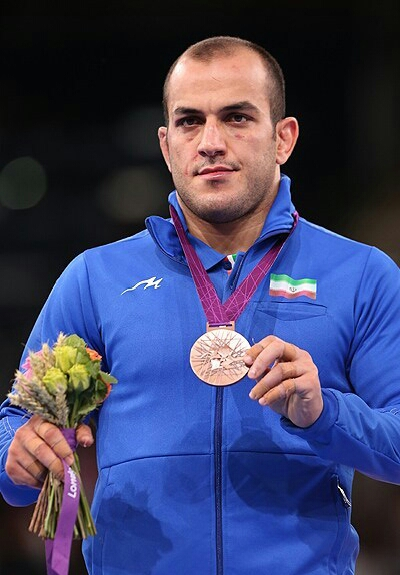
Lashgari at the 2012 summer Olympics

Ehsan Lashgari (Persian: احسان لشگرى, born August 30, 1985, in Qazvin) is an Iranian former freestyle wrestler. He won the bronze medal in the 84 kg Freestyle competition at the 2012 Summer Olympics.

== Personal life ==
On 5 January 2026, Lashgari publicly supported the 2025–2026 Iranian protests on his Instagram, stating: "The main force of foreign diplomacy in any country is the people of that country. Now, you don't listen to the people again."
