= Stefan Reichmuth =

Swiss freestyle wrestler (born 1994)

Personal information
- Nickname: Stifi
- Born: 20 September 1994 (age 31)

Sport
- Country: Switzerland
- Sport: Amateur wrestling
- Weight class: 86 kg
- Event: Freestyle
Medal record
Men's freestyle wrestling
Representing Switzerland
World Championships
Bronze medal – third place	2019 Nur-Sultan	86 kg

Stefan Reichmuth (born 20 September 1994) is a Swiss freestyle wrestler. He won one of the bronze medals in the men's 86 kg event at the 2019 World Wrestling Championships held in Nur-Sultan, Kazakhstan. As a result, he became the first Swiss competitor to win a medal at the World Wrestling Championships.

Reichmuth represented Switzerland at the 2020 Summer Olympics held in Tokyo, Japan. He competed in the men's 86 kg event.

== Career ==
In 2015, Reichmuth represented Switzerland at the European Games in the men's freestyle 74 kg event without winning a medal. In the same year, he also competed in the men's freestyle 74 kg event at the 2015 World Wrestling Championships held in Las Vegas, United States without winning a medal. He was eliminated in his first match by Jabrayil Hasanov of Azerbaijan. The following year, he competed at the 2016 European Wrestling Olympic Qualification Tournament hoping to qualify for the 2016 Summer Olympics in Rio de Janeiro, Brazil. He did not advance far as he was eliminated in his first match by Ibragim Aldatov of Ukraine.

Reichmuth competed in the men's 86 kg event at the 2023 World Wrestling Championships held in Belgrade, Serbia. He competed at the 2024 World Wrestling Olympic Qualification Tournament held in Istanbul, Turkey without qualifying for the 2024 Summer Olympics in Paris, France.

== Achievements ==
Year	Tournament	Location	Result	Event
2019	World Championships	Nur-Sultan, Kazakhstan	3rd	Freestyle 86 kg
