= Orgodolyn Üitümen =

Mongolian freestyle wrestler

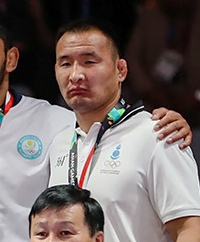
- Orgodolyn Üitümen at the 2018 Asian Games

Personal information
- Native name: Оргодолын Үйтүмэн
- Nationality: Mongolia
- Born: 29 April 1989 (age 37) Övörkhangai, Mongolia
- Height: 174 cm (5 ft 9 in)

Sport
- Country: Mongolia
- Sport: Wrestling
- Weight class: 86 kg
- Event: Freestyle

Achievements and titles
- World finals: 8th (2013) 8th (2015)
Medal record
Men's Freestyle wrestling
Representing Mongolia
Asian Games
Bronze medal – third place	2018 Jakarta	86 kg
Asian Championships
Silver medal – second place	2018 Bishkek	86 kg
Silver medal – second place	2016 Bangkok	86 kg
Bronze medal – third place	2014 Astana	86 kg
Military World Games
Bronze medal – third place	2015 Mungyeong	86 kg
World Military Championships
Gold medal – first place	2014 New Jersey	86 kg
Golden Grand Prix Ivan Yarygin
Silver medal – second place	2015 Krasnoyarsk	86 kg
Bronze medal – third place	2019 Krasnoyarsk	86 kg

Orgodolyn Üitümen (born 29 April 1989) is a Mongolian freestyle wrestler who won a bronze medal at the 2018 Asian Games. He competed in the freestyle 84 kg event at the 2012 Summer Olympics and was eliminated by Dato Marsagishvili in the 1/8 finals. At the 2015 World Wrestling Championships, he lost to Abdulrashid Sadulaev in round of 16. At the 2016 Olympics, he lost his first bout to Mihail Ganev.

Üitümen took up wrestling in 2007. He is married and has a child.
