= Vladislav Valiev =

Russian freestyle wrestler

Personal information
- Native name: Владислав Валиев
- Nationality: Russia
- Born: 25 April 1993 (age 33) Moscow, Russia
- Height: 174 cm (5 ft 9 in)

Sport
- Country: Russia
- Sport: Amateur wrestling
- Weight class: 86 kg
- Event: Freestyle
Medal record
Men's freestyle wrestling
Representing Russia
World Championships
Bronze medal – third place	2017 Paris	86 kg
World Cup
Gold medal – first place	2019 Yakutsk	86 kg
European Championships
Gold medal – first place	2019 Bucharest	86 kg
Russian National Championships
Gold medal – first place	2017 Nazran	86 kg
Silver medal – second place	2019 Sochi	86 kg
Bronze medal – third place	2022 Kyzyl	92 kg
Bronze medal – third place	2018 Odintsovo	86 kg
Bronze medal – third place	2016 Yakutsk	86 kg
Golden Grand Prix Ivan Yarygin
Bronze medal – third place	2021 Krasnoyarsk	86 kg
Bronze medal – third place	2019 Krasnoyarsk	86 kg
Bronze medal – third place	2018 Krasnoyarsk	86 kg
Bronze medal – third place	2017 Krasnoyarsk	86 kg
Junior World Championships
Gold medal – first place	2013 Sofia	84 kg
Junior European Championships
Gold medal – first place	2013 Skopje	84 kg
Cadet European Championships
Gold medal – first place	2010 Sarajevo	85 kg

Vladislav Valiev (born 25 April 1993) is a Russian freestyle wrestler. He won the gold medal in the men's freestyle 86 kg event at the 2019 European Wrestling Championships held in Bucharest, Romania. He also won one of the bronze medals at the 2017 World Wrestling Championships held in Paris, France.

== Career ==
In 2015, he competed in the 86 kg event at the Russian National Freestyle Wrestling Championships without winning a medal.

He won one of the bronze medals in the men's freestyle 86 kg event at the 2016 Russian National Freestyle Wrestling Championships held in Yakutsk, Sakha-Yakutia, Russia.

The following year, he won one of the bronze medals in the men's freestyle 86 kg event at the Golden Grand Prix Ivan Yarygin 2017 held in Krasnoyarsk, Russia. Later in 2017, he won the gold medal in the men's freestyle 86 kg event at the 2017 Russian National Freestyle Wrestling Championships held in Nazran, Ingushetia, Russia.

== Achievements ==
Year	Tournament	Location	Result	Event
2017	World Championships	Paris, France	3rd	Freestyle 86 kg
2019	European Championships	Bucharest, Romania	1st	Freestyle 86 kg
