= Musa Murtazaliev =

Armenian freestyle wrestler

Personal information
- Born: 26 May 1988 (age 38) Khasavyurt, Dagestan
- Height: 1.76 m (5 ft 9 1/2 in)
- Weight: 86 kg (190 lb)

Sport
- Sport: Wrestling
- Event: Freestyle
- Coached by: Abdurahman Mirzaev; Araik Baghdadyan
Medal record
Men's freestyle wrestling
Representing Armenia
European Championships
Silver medal – second place	2011 Dortmund	74 kg
Silver medal – second place	2013 Tbilisi	84 kg
Bronze medal – third place	2014 Vantaa	86 kg

Musa Murtazaliev (born 26 May 1988) is an Armenian Freestyle wrestler. Although he is from Dagestan, Musa represents Armenia.

Murtazaliev won a silver medal at the 2011 European Wrestling Championships. He won another silver medal at the 2013 European Wrestling Championships. Murtazaliev had moved up in weight from 74 kg to 84 kg. Murtazaliev won a bronze medal at the 2014 European Wrestling Championships.

He is married.
