= Soslan Ktsoev =

Russian wrestler (born 1982)

Soslan Ktsoev Сослан Кцоев
Personal information
- Full name: Soslan Mairbekovich Ktsoev
- Nationality: Russian
- Born: July 10, 1982 (age 44) Beslan, North Ossetia-Alania, Soviet Union
- Weight: 86 kg (190 lb)

Sport
- Country: Russia
- Sport: Wrestling
- Rank: Grand master of sports
- Event: Freestyle
- Coached by: Khasan Apaev, Artur Bazaev, Khazbi Buguloev
Medal record
Men's Freestyle wrestling
Representing Russia
World Championships
Bronze medal – third place	2010 Moscow	84 kg
European Championships
Gold medal – first place	2009 Vilnius	84 kg

Soslan Mairbekovich Ktsoev (Ossetian:Кцойты Мæирбеджы фырт Сослан, Russian: Сослан Маирбекович Кцоев; born October 7, 1982, in Beslan) is a Russian male freestyle wrestler. He was a bronze medalist in the Freestyle Wrestling World Championships 2010 and the 2009 European Championships. He was a Russian National champion in 2010, and a 6 times Russian nationals bronze medalist.
