= Fatih Erdin =

Turkish freestyle wrestler

Personal information
- Nationality: Turkey
- Born: 1 February 1994 (age 32) Çorum, Turkey
- Height: 1.77 m (5 ft 10 in)
- Weight: 92 kg (203 lb; 14.5 st)

Sport
- Country: Turkey
- Sport: Wrestling
- Weight class: 92 kg
- Event: Freestyle
- Club: Ankara İlbank
- Turned pro: 2011
Medal record
Men's freestyle wrestling
Representing Turkey
World Championships
Silver medal – second place	2018 Budapest	86 kg
European Championships
Bronze medal – third place	2019 Bucharest	86 kg
Mediterranean Games
Silver medal – second place	2022 Oran	86 kg
Yasar Dogu Tournament
Gold medal – first place	2023 Istanbul	86 kg
Gold medal – first place	2026 Antalya	92 kg
Silver medal – second place	2022 Istanbul	86 kg
Bronze medal – third place	2021 Istanbul	86 kg
Bronze medal – third place	2018 Istanbul	86 kg
Bronze medal – third place	2017 Istanbul	86 kg
Ivan Yarygin Golden Grand Prix
Silver medal – second place	2018 Krasnoyarsk	86 kg
Silver medal – second place	2019 Krasnoyarsk	86 kg
Dan Kolov & Nikola Petrov Tournament
Silver medal – second place	2023 Sofia	86 kg
Grand Prix
Gold medal – first place	2018 Tbilisi	86 kg
Silver medal – second place	2014 Yakutsk	86 kg
Silver medal – second place	2020 Rome	86 kg
Bronze medal – third place	2018 Minsk	86 kg
Bronze medal – third place	2019 Warsaw	86 kg
Bronze medal – third place	2020 Warsaw	86 kg
Bronze medal – third place	2022 Almaty	86 kg
European Juniors Championships
Bronze medal – third place	2014 Katowice	84 kg
European Cadets Championships
Gold medal – first place	2011 Warsaw	76 kg

Fatih Erdin (born February 1, 1994) is a Turkish freestyle wrestler competing in the 86 kg division. He is a member of Ankara İlbank. He qualified for the final match of 2018 World Wrestling Championships which was held in Budapest, Hungary on 20 and 21 October 2018 and won the silver medal.

== Career ==
Fatih Erdin participated in the 2018 Ivan Yargyin Grand-Prix competition, where he successfully obtained a silver medal. He defeated Zaur Beradze, Almas Zhunis and Vladislav Valiev to reach the finals, where he lost to the American champion David Taylor.

Fatih Erdin also won a silver medal in the 2014 Dmitri Korkin Tournament in Russia, a gold medal in the 2011 Poland Cadets European Championship, a silver medal in 2019 Ivan Yargyin Grand-Prix, a gold medal in G. Kartozia & V. Balavadze Price in Georgia, a bronze medal in the 2018 Alexander Medved Prizes and a bronze medal in the 2018 Yaşar Doğu.

He won the silver medal in the 86 kg event at the 2022 Mediterranean Games held in Oran, Algeria, losing to Myles Amine from San Marino. He advanced to the finals by defeating Choiras Charalambos from Cyprus in the quarter finales and Osman Hajdari from Albania in the semi finals with a score of 10-0.

He competed in the 86 kg event at the 2022 World Wrestling Championships held in Belgrade, Serbia.
