= Mihail Ganev =

Bulgarian freestyle wrestler

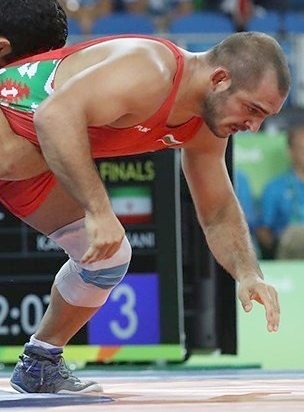
- Ganev at the 2016 Olympics

Personal information
- Nationality: (Bulgaria) Bulgarian
- Born: January 5, 1985 (age 41) Veliko Tarnovo, Bulgaria
- Height: 1.72 m (5 ft 8 in)
- Weight: 86 kg (190 lb)

Sport
- Sport: Freestyle wrestling
- Club: SK Levski
- Coached by: Simeon Shterev; Petar Kasabov; Valentin Raichev
Medal record
Representing Bulgaria
World Championships
Gold medal – first place	2010 Moscow	84 kg
European Championships
Bronze medal – third place	2010 Baku	84 kg
Silver medal – second place	2012 Belgrade	84 kg
Bronze medal – third place	2017 Novi Sad	97 kg

Mihail Petrov Ganev (Bulgarian: Михаил Петров Ганев, born January 5, 1985) is a freestyle wrestler from Bulgaria who won the world title in the 84 kg division in 2010. He was eliminated in the second bout at the 2016 Olympics.

In December 2010 he was stabbed in the stomach with a knife and was out of training for a month. He lost another four months from March to July 2015 due to an injury. He withdrew from the 2016 European Championships due to another injury, to a knee ligament.
