= Sandro Aminashvili =

Georgian freestyle wrestler

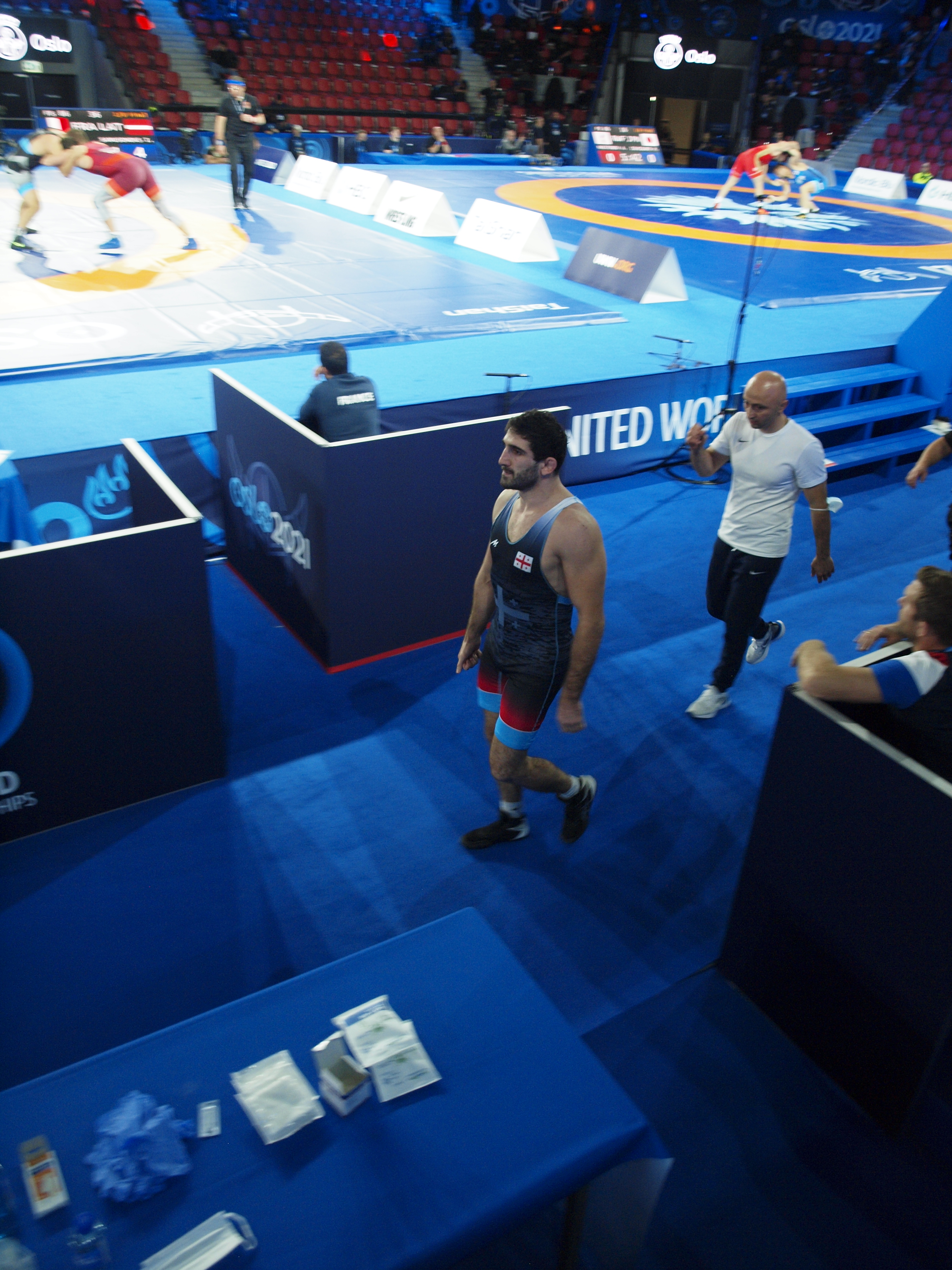

Personal information
- Native name: სანდრო ამინაშვილი
- Nationality: Georgia
- Born: February 21, 1992 (age 34) Tbilisi, Georgia
- Height: 180 cm (5 ft 11 in)

Sport
- Country: Georgia
- Sport: Wrestling
- Weight class: 86 kg
- Event: Freestyle

Achievements and titles
- World finals: (bronze) (2015)
- Regional finals: (bronze) (2018) (silver) (2021)
Medal record
Men's Freestyle wrestling
Representing Georgia
World Championships
Bronze medal – third place	2015 Las Vegas	86 kg
World Cup
Bronze medal – third place	2016 Los Angeles	86 kg
European Games
Bronze medal – third place	2015 Baku	86 kg
European Championships
Silver medal – second place	2021 Warsaw	86 kg
Bronze medal – third place	2018 Kaspiysk	86 kg

Sandro Aminashvili (born February 21, 1992) is a Georgian freestyle wrestler. He competed in the men's freestyle 86 kg event at the 2016 Summer Olympics, in which he was eliminated in the round of 16 by Zbigniew Baranowski. 2015 World Wrestling Championships bronze medalist. At the 2018 European Wrestling Championships, Aminashvili won bronze medal in men's freestyle 86 kg event. In March 2021, he competed at the European Qualification Tournament in Budapest, Hungary hoping to qualify for the 2020 Summer Olympics in Tokyo, Japan.
