= Radosław Marcinkiewicz =

Polish freestyle wrestler

Personal information
- Born: 1 March 1986 (age 40)
- Height: 176 cm (5 ft 9 in)

Sport
- Country: Poland
- Sport: Amateur wrestling
- Event: Freestyle
Medal record
Men's freestyle wrestling
Representing Poland
European Games
Bronze medal – third place	2015 Baku	86 kg

Radosław Marcinkiewicz (born 1 March 1986) is a Polish freestyle wrestler. He won one of the bronze medals in the 86 kg event at the 2015 European Games held in Baku, Azerbaijan.

He competed in the 92 kg event at the 2022 World Wrestling Championships held in Belgrade, Serbia.

== Achievements ==
Year	Tournament	Location	Result	Event
2015	European Games	Baku, Azerbaijan	3rd	Freestyle 86 kg
