= Ahmed Dudarov =

German freestyle wrestler

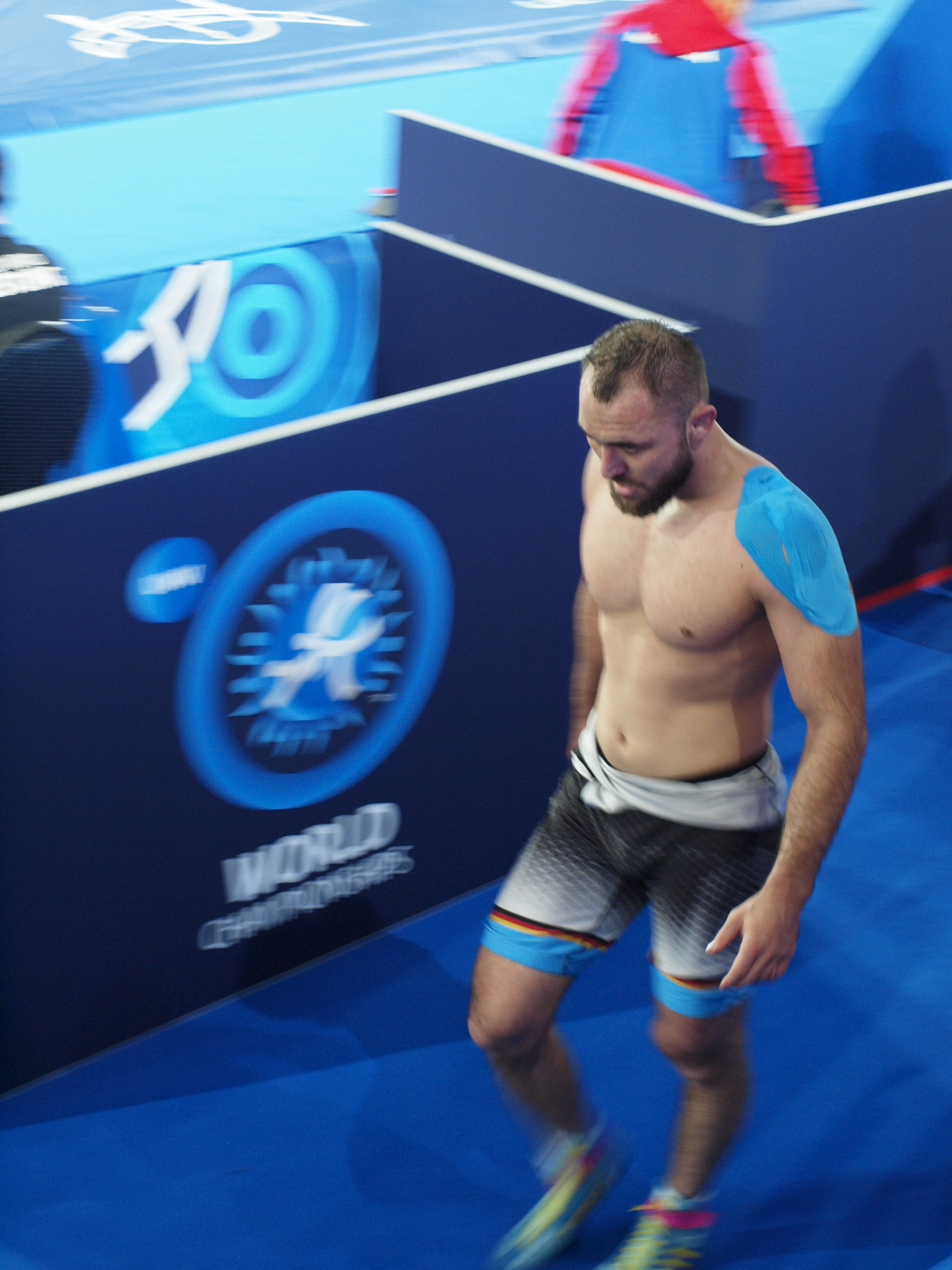
- Dudarov at the 2021 World Wrestling Championships in Oslo, Norway

Personal information
- Full name: Ahmed Ruslanovich Dudarov
- Nationality: Russian; German
- Born: 6 July 1992 (age 34) Grozny, Chechnya, Russia
- Height: 181 cm (5 ft 11 in)

Sport
- Country: Germany
- Sport: Amateur wrestling
- Weight class: 86 kg
- Event: Freestyle
Medal record
Men's freestyle wrestling
Representing Germany
European Games
Bronze medal – third place	2019 Minsk	86 kg
Military World Games
Silver medal – second place	2019 Wuhan	86 kg

Ahmed Ruslanovich Dudarov (born 6 July 1992 in Chechnya) is a Russian-born German freestyle wrestler of Chechen heritage. He won one of the bronze medals in the men's 86 kg event at the 2019 European Games held in Minsk, Belarus.

== Career ==
In 2019, he won the silver medal in the men's freestyle 86 kg event at the Military World Games held in Wuhan, China. In the final, he lost against Artur Naifonov of Russia.

In March 2021, he competed at the European Qualification Tournament in Budapest, Hungary hoping to qualify for the 2020 Summer Olympics in Tokyo, Japan. He did not qualify at this tournament and he also failed to qualify for the Olympics at the World Olympic Qualification Tournament held in Sofia, Bulgaria. In October 2021, he competed in the men's 86 kg event at the World Wrestling Championships held in Oslo, Norway.

== Achievements ==
Year	Tournament	Location	Result	Event
2019	European Games	Minsk, Belarus	3rd	Freestyle 86 kg
2019	Military World Games	Wuhan, China	2nd	Freestyle 86 kg
