= Piotr Ianulov =

Moldovan freestyle wrestler

Personal information
- Born: 27 February 1986 (age 40)
- Height: 180 cm (5 ft 11 in)

Sport
- Country: Moldova
- Sport: Amateur wrestling
- Event: Freestyle
Medal record
Men's freestyle wrestling
Representing Moldova
Individual World Cup
Bronze medal – third place	2020 Belgrade	86 kg
European Games
Silver medal – second place	2015 Baku	86 kg
European Championships
Silver medal – second place	2019 Bucharest	86 kg
Summer Universiade
Bronze medal – third place	2013 Kazan	84 kg

Piotr Ianulov (born 27 February 1986) is a Moldovan freestyle wrestler. He is a silver medalist at both the European Games and European Wrestling Championships.

== Career ==
In 2015, at the European Games held in Baku, Azerbaijan, Ianulov won the silver medal in the 86 kg event. In the same year, he also competed in the men's freestyle 86 kg event at the 2015 World Wrestling Championships held in Las Vegas, United States where he was eliminated in his second match by Alireza Karimi of Iran.

At the 2019 European Wrestling Championships held in Bucharest, Romania, Ianulov won the silver medal in the 86 kg event. In the final, he lost against Vladislav Valiev of Russia. In 2020, he won one of the bronze medals in the men's 86 kg event at the 2020 Individual Wrestling World Cup held in Belgrade, Serbia. In March 2021, Ianulov competed at the European Qualification Tournament in Budapest, Hungary hoping to qualify for the 2020 Summer Olympics in Tokyo, Japan. He did not qualify at this tournament and he also failed to qualify for the Olympics at the World Olympic Qualification Tournament held in Sofia, Bulgaria.

== Achievements ==
Year	Tournament	Location	Result	Event
2013	Summer Universiade	Kazan, Russia	3rd	Freestyle 84 kg
2015	European Games	Baku, Azerbaijan	2nd	Freestyle 86 kg
2019	European Championships	Bucharest, Romania	2nd	Freestyle 86 kg
