= István Veréb =

Hungarian sport wrestler

Personal information
- Born: 8 October 1987 (age 39) Szombathely, Hungary
Medal record
Representing Hungary
Men's freestyle wrestling
World Championships
Bronze medal – third place	2013 Budapest	84 kg
European Championships
Bronze medal – third place	2019 Bucharest	92 kg
Bronze medal – third place	2017 Novi Sad	86 kg
Bronze medal – third place	2014 Vantaa	86 kg

Istvan Vereb
- Other names: Jimmy
- Height: 5 ft 11 in (1.80 m)
- Weight: 185 lb (84 kg)
- Division: Middleweight
- Style: Greco-Roman wrestling
- Fighting out of: Budapest, Hungary
- Team: Budapest Top Team
- Trainer: Ferenc Peszlen
- Rank: Blue Belt in Brazilian Jiu-Jitsu
- Years active: 2017–present (MMA)

Mixed martial arts record
- Total: 3
- Wins: 2
- By submission: 1
- By decision: 1
- Losses: 1
- By submission: 1

Other information
- Mixed martial arts record from Sherdog

István Veréb (born 8 October 1987) is a Hungarian freestyle wrestler. He participated in Men's freestyle 74 kg at the 2008 Summer Olympics. He was eliminated from the competition after he lost to Ben Askren in the 1/16 finals.

In March 2021, he competed at the European Qualification Tournament in Budapest, Hungary hoping to qualify for the 2020 Summer Olympics in Tokyo, Japan.

== Mixed martial arts career ==
Vereb made his professional debut on a Fight Arena Hungary card on September 9, 2017. He won the fight via decision against Kalman Kovacs.

Vereb faced Zarko Golubovic on Real Fight Arena 4 on October 9, 2022, he won the fight in the first round via submission.

Vereb faced Michal Dobiaš on February 4, 2023, at Real Fight Arena 8, losing the bout via guillotine choke in the second round.

== Mixed martial arts record ==
Professional record breakdown
3 matches	2 wins	1 loss
By submission	1	1
By decision	1	0

Res.	Record	Opponent	Method	Event	Date	Round	Time	Location	Notes
Loss	2–1	Michal Dobiaš	Submission (guillotine choke)	Real Fight Arena 8	February 4, 2023	2	1:05	Budapest, Hungary	
Win	2–0	Zarko Golubovic	Submission (neck crank)	Real Fight Arena 4	October 8, 2022	1	3:31	Košice, Slovakia	
Win	1–0	Kalman Kovacs	Decision (split)	Fight Arena Hungary	October 9, 2017	3	5:00	Székesfehérvár, Hungary	Middleweight debut.
