= 2019 World Wrestling Championships – Men's freestyle 92 kg =

Men's freestyle 92 kg at the 2019 World Championships
- Venue: Barys Arena
- Dates: 20–21 September 2019
- Competitors: 18 from 18 nations

Medalists
gold medal	J'den Cox	United States
silver medal	Alireza Karimi	Iran
bronze medal	Irakli Mtsituri	Georgia
bronze medal	Alikhan Zhabrailov	Russia

The men's freestyle 92 kilograms is a competition featured at the 2019 World Wrestling Championships, and was held in Nur-Sultan, Kazakhstan on 20 and 21 September.

This freestyle wrestling competition consists of a single-elimination tournament, with a repechage used to determine the winner of two bronze medals. The two finalists face off for gold and silver medals. Each wrestler who loses to one of the two finalists moves into the repechage, culminating in a pair of bronze medal matches featuring the semifinal losers each facing the remaining repechage opponent from their half of the bracket.

== Results ==
Legend

- F — Won by fall

=== Final ===
Final
J'den Cox (USA)	4
Alireza Karimi (IRI)	0

=== Top half ===
Round of 32

Round of 16
J'den Cox (USA)	11
Mohammed Fardj (ALG)	0
Nurgali Nurgaipuly (KAZ)	2
Dominic Peter (AUT)	0
Baataryn Nyambayar (MGL)	2
Takuma Otsu (JPN)	9
Bendegúz Tóth (HUN)	0
Irakli Mtsituri (GEO)	8

Quarterfinals
J'den Cox (USA)	8
Nurgali Nurgaipuly (KAZ)	0
Takuma Otsu (JPN)	0
Irakli Mtsituri (GEO)	5

Semifinals
J'den Cox (USA)	3
Irakli Mtsituri (GEO)	0

=== Bottom half ===
Round of 32
Parveen (IND)	12
Sue Chang-jae (KOR)	1
Sun Xiao (CHN)	0
Georgii Rubaev (MDA)	10

Round of 16
Ivan Yankouski (BLR)	1
Alikhan Zhabrailov (RUS)	8
Süleyman Karadeniz (TUR)	7
Shamil Zubairov (AZE)	6
Liubomyr Sagaliuk (UKR)	8
Parveen (IND)	0
Georgii Rubaev (MDA)	1
Alireza Karimi (IRI)	12

Quarterfinals
Alikhan Zhabrailov (RUS)	4
Süleyman Karadeniz (TUR)	3
Liubomyr Sagaliuk (UKR)	2
Alireza Karimi (IRI)	12

Semifinals
Alikhan Zhabrailov (RUS)	0
Alireza Karimi (IRI)	10

=== Repechage ===
Repechage round 2
Mohammed Fardj (ALG)	1
Nurgali Nurgaipuly (KAZ)	7^{F}
Georgii Rubaev (MDA)	7
Liubomyr Sagaliuk (UKR)	0

Bronze medals
Nurgali Nurgaipuly (KAZ)	1
Irakli Mtsituri (GEO)	2
Georgii Rubaev (MDA)	2
Alikhan Zhabrailov (RUS)	3
