= J'den Cox =

American wrestler (born 1995)

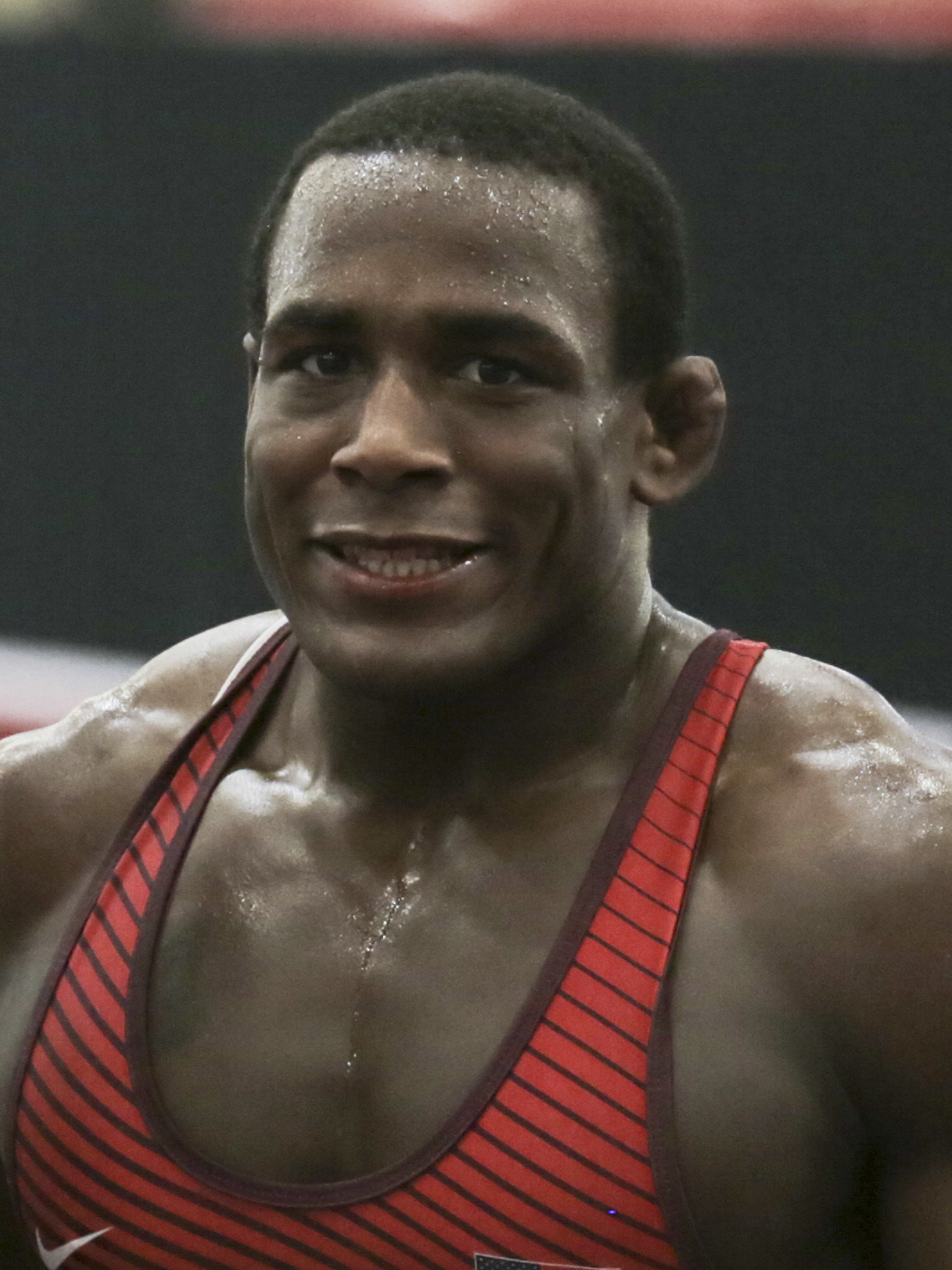
- Cox in 2018

Personal information
- Full name: J'den Cox
- Nickname: The Matrix
- National team: USA
- Born: March 3, 1995 (age 31) Columbia, Missouri, U.S.
- Height: 6 ft 0 in (183 cm)
- Weight: 86 kg (190 lb); 92 kg (203 lb); 97 kg (214 lb)

Sport
- Country: United States
- Sport: Wrestling
- Event: Freestyle (International) Folkstyle (College)
- College team: University of Missouri
- Club: Cliff Keen Wrestling Club; Titan Mercury Wrestling Club
Medal record
Men's freestyle wrestling
Representing the United States
Olympic Games
Bronze medal – third place	2016 Rio de Janeiro	86 kg
World Championships
Gold medal – first place	2018 Budapest	92 kg
Gold medal – first place	2019 Nur-Sultan	92 kg
Silver medal – second place	2022 Belgrade	92 kg
Bronze medal – third place	2017 Paris	86 kg
Bronze medal – third place	2021 Oslo	92 kg
Pan American Championships
Gold medal – first place	2019 Buenos Aires	92 kg
Gold medal – first place	2022 Acapulco	92 kg
Yasar Dogu Tournament
Gold medal – first place	2019 Istanbul	92 kg
US Open Championships
Gold medal – first place	2018 Las Vegas	92 kg
Men's collegiate wrestling
Representing the Missouri Tigers
NCAA Division I Championships
Gold medal – first place	2014 Oklahoma City	197 lb
Gold medal – first place	2016 New York	197 lb
Gold medal – first place	2017 St. Louis	197 lb
MAC Championships
Gold medal – first place	2014 Kent	197 lb
Gold medal – first place	2015 Columbia	197 lb
Gold medal – first place	2016 Ypsilanti	197 lb
Gold medal – first place	2017 Cedar Falls	197 lb

J'den Michael Tbory Cox (/ˈdʒeɪdən/ JAY-dən, born March 3, 1995) is an American retired freestyle wrestler and folkstyle wrestler who competed at 92 kilograms. In freestyle, Cox was a two-time World Champion (bronze medalist in 2021) at 92 kilos, and while competing at 86 kilos, he claimed a bronze medal from the 2016 Summer Olympics and a 2017 World Championship bronze medal. During college, Cox wrestled for the Missouri Tigers, and was a three-time NCAA Division I national champion and four-time Mid-American Conference champion, becoming one of the most accomplished Tigers in the program's history.

== Early life ==
Cox was born and raised in Columbia, Missouri and began wrestling at the age of four. The first youth state tournament Cox entered is the last state tournament at any level he did not win. Cox began training with Mike Eierman (Jaydin Eierman's father) in 2006 and continued training with Eierman until his move to the United States Olympic Training Center in Colorado Springs, Colorado in 2018.

Cox attended Hickman High School, where he was an all–state linebacker in addition to a standout high school wrestler. He was a four–time Missouri state champion, and one of the first wrestlers in Missouri to win titles at four different weight classes. Cox compiled a 205–3 record in his high school career, suffering all three losses his freshman season.

Cox also had success on the national level. In 2011 he won a Cadet National Championship in Greco-Roman, and took third place in freestyle. A rivalry developed between Cox and fellow future multiple-time World Champion Kyle Snyder. Cox defeated Snyder in the Greco-Roman final while losing to Snyder in pool competition in freestyle. In 2012, Cox won a Junior National Championship in freestyle and took third in Greco-Roman. Again Cox and Snyder traded victories between styles, with Cox defeating Snyder in pool competition in freestyle and Snyder defeating Cox in Greco-Roman pool competition.

Cox was ranked the third-overall recruit in the 2013 class by FloWrestling and sixth overall by InterMat.

== College career ==
Cox stayed at home in Columbia and wrestled collegiately for the Missouri Tigers. Cox bypassed a redshirt year and wrestled right away for the Tigers at 197 lbs. in the 2013–14 season. He was a MAC champion and entered the 2014 NCAA Championships as the #2 seed. Cox defeated Nick Heflin of Ohio State in final to become a national champion. At the time Cox became just the 14th true freshman national champion in NCAA Division 1 history. Cox finished the season with a 38–2 record and was recognized as both the 2014 MAC Wrestler of the Year and Freshman of the Year.

In his sophomore season, Cox again took home All-American honors by virtue of his 5th-place finish at the 2015 NCAA Championships. Cox entered the tournament undefeated on the season and earned the #1 seed in the 197 lb. bracket. Cox suffered his first loss of the year in the semifinal to Kyle Snyder and suffered another loss to Morgan McIntosh in consolations before finishing 5th. He was a MAC champion again and finished the year with a 37–2 record.

Cox returned to the top of the podium in 2016. After becoming a MAC champion for the third time, he entered the NCAA Championships as the #2 seed. Cox defeated Morgan McIntosh in the final 4–2, avenging his loss from the previous year. He joined Ben Askren as the only other two-time national champion in school history. Cox finished the season with a 33–1 record and was recognized as the MAC Wrestler of the Year for the second time.

In 2017, Cox finished off his collegiate career with another national championship. He was a perfect 28–0 on the season and finished second in Hodge Trophy voting. Cox was a MAC champion for the fourth time and was honored as the MAC Wrestler of the Year for the third time.

Cox was the first three-time national champion in program history. Among program records, he finished his career ranked first in winning percentage (.965, 136–5) and tied for second in wins (136).

== Freestyle career ==
=== 2014–2015 ===
Cox was an accomplished freestyle wrestler growing up, claiming multiple US National Championships, despite never competing overseas. In 2014, the newly crowned freshman NCAA champion at 197 pounds, decided to compete at 97 kilograms (214 pounds) despite being undersized for the weight class, and made his senior level debut by placing third at the US University National Championships, and later in the month competing at the US World Team Trials, but failing to place. In 2015, he placed fourth at the US Senior Nationals, falling to eventual 2015 World Champion Kyle Snyder by one point throughout the bracket.

=== 2016 ===
As a 2016 NCAA champion, Cox qualified to compete at the 2016 US Olympic Team Trials, and chose to trim down to 86 kilograms. Despite being the ninth seed, Cox was able to upset multiple high–level opponents to make the best–of–three, beating '11 NCAA runner–up from Oklahoma State Clayton Foster, '09 World Championship runner–up Jake Herbert and two–time US Open and NCAA champion Keith Gavin to reach the finale. There, he defeated four–time NCAA champion Kyle Dake, who was bumping up from 74 kilograms, two matches to one to claim the 2016 US Olympic Team spot.

However, the weight had not been qualified for the Summer Olympics for the United States, which meant Cox would have overcome a field at one of the qualification tournaments to qualify. Cox did just that when he comfortably won gold at the 2016 World Olympic Qualification Tournament I, his first tournament overseas. After defeating '12 University World Champion from Iran Meisam Mostafa-Jokar at Beat the Streets, Cox competed for Team USA at the 2016 World Cup, beating two–time Commonwealth champion Pawan Kumar, returning World Championship bronze medalist from Iran Alireza Karimi and 2016 European Championship runner–up Aleksander Gostiev, before being defeated himself by '12 Olympic bronze medalist from Georgia Dato Marsagishvili, helping Team USA reach fourth place. To warm up for the Summer Olympics, Cox placed third at the Grand Prix of Germany, suffering his lone loss to World and reigning Olympic champion from Azerbaijan Sharif Sharifov.

At the Summer Olympics, Cox claimed victories over Amarhajy Mahamedau and Alireza Karimi before suffering a loss to '09 Junior World Champion Selim Yaşar in the semifinals, getting knocked off to the consolation bracket, where he posted a victory over reigning Pan American Games champion Reineris Salas, in a match were the Cuban refused to continue after suffering a takedown from Cox. This result drove Cox to becoming a bronze medalist at the 2016 Summer Olympics.

=== 2017 ===
After collegiate graduation, the three–time NCAA champion went on to defend his US World Team spot against reigning US National champion and eventual '18 World Champion David Taylor at the 2017 US World Team Trials in June. After losing the first match, Cox rallied to defeat Taylor twice in a row despite a knee injury to retain the spot, although controversially due to his excessive sweat and alleged passivity. At the 2017 World Championships, he most notably went on to defeat '12 Junior World Championship runner–up Ahmed Dudarov and Dan Kolov International champion Zbigniew Baranowski before losing to Boris Makoev, coming back and defeating 2010 World Champion Mihail Ganev for bronze.

=== 2018–2019 ===
Cox made his return by moving up to 92 kilograms in February 2018, claiming a silver medal from the Ukrainian Open after losing to World and Olympic champion Sharif Sharifov in the finale. He then went 1–2 at the World Cup, helping Team USA reach the team championship for the first time in 15 years. Cox then went on to claim the US National Championship and retain the US World Team spot at Final X. Before the World Championships, Cox went 0–1 at the Yasar Dogu.

Despite his low international success at the new weight class earlier in the year, Cox went on to claim his first World Championship for the United States, defeating two–time European Continental champion from Georgia Dato Marsagishvili, three–time Olympian from Moldova Nicolai Ceban, '18 Asian Games gold medalist from Iran Alireza Karimi and '16 European Championship runner–up from Belarus Ivan Yankouski.

The returning World Champion, Cox claimed his first Pan American Continental Championship in his first tournament of the year, helping the US reach gold in all of the 10 freestyle categories in the competition. Cox then went on to defend his US World Team spot once again, headlining Final X Rutgers, where he shut down reigning US National champion, recently graduated three–time NCAA champion and Dan Hodge Trophy winner Bo Nickal twice in a row. He then swept past the prestigious Yasar Dogu field with all technical falls to claim the championship.

At the World Championships, the defending champion was able to retain his spot on top of the podium and claim his second World Championship, most notably defeating Irakli Mtsituri and Alireza Karimi.

=== 2020–2021 ===
To start off the 2020 Summer Olympic year, Cox moved up to 97 kilograms to fit the weight class requirements for the Olympics. In his first tournament, he most notably downed '15 Pan American Games champion (86kg) Reineris Salas and returning Junior World Championship runner–up Yonger Bastida to claim gold at the Cerro Pelado International. Cox was then scheduled to compete at the US Olympic Team Trials, however, the COVID-19 outbreak postponed both the US Team Trials and the Summer Olympics for a year later.

Cox did not come back to action until a year later when he competed at a series of FloWrestling events, compiling six more wins in total during January and February 2021. Cox was then expected to compete at the rescheduled US Olympic Team Trials, as the favorite to challenge reigning Olympic champion Kyle Snyder in the best–of–three. However, it was announced on the day of the event that Cox had missed weight, therefore he had been removed from competition. Days later, more detail was given to the public, and it was explained that Cox had arrived to the weight-ins on time, but once he had stepped on the scale and successfully made the weight limit of 97 kg, it had been thirteen minutes past the 8:00 AM deadline, therefore, it was ruled as invalid by USA Wrestling. Cox explained that he was misinformed of the weight-ins schedule by his coach Kevin Jackson, who is part of USA Wrestling.

Cox protested the decision and him and his coach Kevin Jackson decided to appeal, however, nothing came to fruition. A month later, Cox dropped the appeal and announced he had moved past the incident, stating;

"I don't think I could have taken it any better. My only issue when it came to what happened at the trials was there were people who in the light of things, when things were all good, turned their backs, literally." said Cox, "I think I told this to Bill Zadick when he called me, just like a week ago, I told him.; 'I'm here to destroy people's lives now. That's what I'm here to do. I'm here to take people out. I'm here to tear up the world.' It's not out of spite, it's not out of vengeance. It's just what will be. It's to prove to everyone what I've known and to prove and show what's been shown in the last two years, that I'm the best wrestler in the world. And I truly believe that and I'm going to do even more to showcase it."

After the incidents, Cox moved back down to 92 kilograms and competed at the Poland Open on June 9. In an upset, Cox was defeated in the semifinals by a regional circuit wrestler from Ukraine, and forfeited his next bout.

Cox came back and competed at the 2021 US World Team Trials as the top-seed on September 11–12, intending to represent the country at the World Championships for the third straight time. He was once again able to show off his signature movements and went unscored throughout his championship run, downing NCAA champions Drew Foster and Myles Martin, as well as powerhouse Kollin Moore.

At the 2021 World Championships, Cox ran through his first three opponents on the first date, before being downed in a frenetic match by two-time U23 World Champion Kamran Ghasempour in the semifinals. The former champion defeated Ukraine in the bronze medal match to claim third place instead.

=== 2022 ===
In late 2021, it was announced that the brand RUDIS would organize an event headlined by a super match between Olympic, World and NCAA champion Kyle Snyder and Cox, which took place on March 16, 2022, in a best of three format. Cox was defeated in two straight bouts via decision.

=== 2024 ===
On April 19, 2024 Cox competed in the United States Olympic Team Trials for the 2024 Paris Olympics. He won his quarterfinal match over Christian Carrol by a 1-1 criteria decision. In the semifinals, he lost to Kollin Moore by a 2-2 criteria decision. Following the match, Cox left his wrestling shoes in the center of the mat to indicate that he was retiring from wrestling competition.

== Personal life ==
J'den is the son of Michael and Cathy Cox, both musicians. Cathy has long been associated with Mizzou athletics herself: she regularly performs the national anthem at Tiger basketball games. He has two older brothers Zach and Drae, and a younger sister Chai. Cox's uncle Phil Arnold was a two-time Missouri state champion for Hickman High School. The headgear Arnold used in winning his two titles is the same Cox and his older brothers wore during their high school careers.

Cox has lost most of the hearing in his left ear and some of the hearing in his right. Even before he started losing his hearing in college, he was interested in sign language. He took classes on sign language in both high school and college and one day would like to teach those who are hearing impaired. Cox posts videos teaching basic elements of sign language on social media, and Nike apparel supporting him includes the spelling of “Cox” in sign language.

== Freestyle record ==
Senior Freestyle Matches
Res.	Record	Opponent	Score	Date	Event	Location
2022 US World Team Trials (gold) at 92 kg
Win	88–19	(United States) Nate Jackson	3–0	June 3, 2022	2022 Final X: Stillwater	(United States) Stillwater, Oklahoma
Loss	87–19	(United States) Nate Jackson	2–3	June 3, 2022	2022 Final X: Stillwater	(United States) Stillwater, Oklahoma
Win	87–18	(United States) Nate Jackson	4–2	June 3, 2022	2022 Final X: Stillwater	(United States) Stillwater, Oklahoma
2022 Pan American Championships (gold) at 92 kg
Win	86–18	(Mexico) Cristian Sánchez Hernández	TF 10–0	May 8, 2022	2022 Pan American Continental Championships	Acapulco, Mexico
Win	85–18	(Venezuela) Gilberto Ayala Rodriguez	TF 11–0	May 8, 2022	2022 Pan American Continental Championships	Acapulco, Mexico
Win	84–18	(Canada) Jérémy Poirier	TF 11–0	May 8, 2022	2022 Pan American Continental Championships	Acapulco, Mexico
RUDIS+ Super Match (silver) at 97 kg
Loss	83–18	(United States) Kyle Snyder	2–7	March 16, 2022	RUDIS+ Super Match: Snyder vs. Cox	(United States) Detroit, Michigan
Loss	83–17	(United States) Kyle Snyder	5–5	March 16, 2022	RUDIS+ Super Match: Snyder vs. Cox	(United States) Detroit, Michigan
2021 World Championships (bronze) at 92 kg
Win	83–16	(Ukraine) Andriy Vlasov	TF 11–0	October 4, 2021	2021 World Championships	Oslo, Norway
Loss	82–16	(Iran) Kamran Ghasempour	3–3	October 3, 2021	2021 World Championships	Oslo, Norway
Win	82–15	(Canada) Jérémy Poirier	TF 10–0	October 3, 2021	2021 World Championships	Oslo, Norway
Win	81–15	(Italy) Simone Iannattoni	TF 10–0	October 3, 2021	2021 World Championships	Oslo, Norway
Win	80–15	(Mongolia) Dagvadorjiin Orgilokh	TF 13–2	October 3, 2021	2021 World Championships	Oslo, Norway
2021 US World Team Trials (gold) at 92 kg
Win	79–15	(United States) Kollin Moore	4–0	September 12, 2021	2021 US World Team Trials	(United States) Lincoln, Nebraska
Win	78–15	(United States) Kollin Moore	5–0	September 12, 2021	2021 US World Team Trials	(United States) Lincoln, Nebraska
Win	77–15	(United States) Myles Martin	8–0	September 11, 2021	2021 US World Team Trials	(United States) Lincoln, Nebraska
Win	76–15	(United States) Drew Foster	TF 11–0	September 11, 2021	2021 US World Team Trials	(United States) Lincoln, Nebraska
2021 Poland Open 5th at 92 kg
Loss	75–15	(Ukraine) Illia Archaia	1–2	June 9, 2021	2021 Poland Open	Warsaw, Poland
Win	75–14	(Germany) Ilja Matuhin	4–2	June 9, 2021	2021 Poland Open	Warsaw, Poland
2021 America's Cup (bronze) as TCA at 97 kg
Win	74–14	(United States) Scottie Boykin	TF 11–0	February 10–11, 2021	2021 America's Cup	(United States) Concord, North Carolina
Win	73–14	(United States) Benjamin Honis	TF 12–0	February 10–11, 2021	2021 America's Cup	(United States) Concord, North Carolina
Win	72–14	(United States) Hayden Zillmer	5–0	February 10–11, 2021	2021 America's Cup	(United States) Concord, North Carolina
Win	71–14	(United States) Benjamin Honis	TF 10–0	February 10–11, 2021	2021 America's Cup	(United States) Concord, North Carolina
Win	70-14	(United States) Nate Jackson	6-1	January 13, 2021	FloWrestling: Burroughs vs. Taylor	(United States) Lincoln, Nebraska
Win	69-14	(United States) Hayden Zillmer	6-2	January 9, 2021	FloWrestling: Mensah-Stock vs. Gray	(United States) Austin, Texas
2020 Granma y Cerro Pelado (gold) at 97 kg
Win	68-14	(Cuba) Yonger Bastida	TF 11-1	February 9–17, 2020	2020 Granma y Cerro Pelado	Habana, Cuba
Win	67-14	(United States) Jacob Kasper	4-0	February 9–17, 2020	2020 Granma y Cerro Pelado	Habana, Cuba
Win	66-14	(Cuba) Reineris Salas	5-3	February 9–17, 2020	2020 Granma y Cerro Pelado	Habana, Cuba
2019 World Championships (gold) at 92 kg
Win	65-14	(Iran) Alireza Karimi	4-0	September 20–21, 2019	2019 World Wrestling Championships	Nur-Sultan, Kazakhstan
Win	64-14	(Georgia (country)) Irakli Mtsituri	3-0	September 20–21, 2019	2019 World Wrestling Championships	Nur-Sultan, Kazakhstan
Win	63-14	(Kazakhstan) Nurgali Nurgaipuly	8-0	September 20–21, 2019	2019 World Wrestling Championships	Nur-Sultan, Kazakhstan
Win	62-14	(Algeria) Mohammed Fardj	TF 11-0	September 20–21, 2019	2019 World Wrestling Championships	Nur-Sultan, Kazakhstan
2019 Yaşar Doğu (gold) at 92 kg
Win	61-14	(Hungary) Bendegúz Tóth	TF 10-0	July 11–14, 2019	2019 Yaşar Doğu	Istanbul, Turkey
Win	60-14	(Azerbaijan) Shamil Zubairov	TF 11-0	July 11–14, 2019	2019 Yaşar Doğu	Istanbul, Turkey
Win	59-14	(Algeria) Mohammed Fardj	TF 11-0	July 11–14, 2019	2019 Yaşar Doğu	Istanbul, Turkey
Win	58-14	(Kazakhstan) Abubakar Turgayev	TF 11-0	July 11–14, 2019	2019 Yaşar Doğu	Istanbul, Turkey
2019 US World Team Trials (gold) at 92 kg
Win	57-14	(United States) Bo Nickal	5-0	June 8, 2019	2019 Final X: Rutgers	(United States) New Brunswick, New Jersey
Win	56-14	(United States) Bo Nickal	4-2	June 8, 2019	2019 Final X: Rutgers	(United States) New Brunswick, New Jersey
Win	55-14	(United States) Pat Brucki	TF 13-0	May 6, 2019	2019 Beat The Streets: Grapple at the Garden	(United States) New York City, New York
2019 Pan American Championship (gold) at 92 kg
Win	54-14	(Paraguay) Diego Ramírez	Fall	April 19–21, 2019	2019 Pan American Wrestling Championships	Buenos Aires, Argentina
Win	53-14	(Puerto Rico) Jaime Espinal	8-0	April 19–21, 2019	2019 Pan American Wrestling Championships	Buenos Aires, Argentina
2018 World Championships (gold) at 92 kg
Win	52-14	(Belarus) Ivan Yankouski	4-1	October 21–22, 2018	2018 World Wrestling Championships	Budapest, Hungary
Win	51-14	(Iran) Alireza Karimi	5-2	October 21–22, 2018	2018 World Wrestling Championships	Budapest, Hungary
Win	50-14	(Moldova) Nicolai Ceban	6-0	October 21–22, 2018	2018 World Wrestling Championships	Budapest, Hungary
Win	49-14	(Georgia (country)) Dato Marsagishvili	6-2	October 21–22, 2018	2018 World Wrestling Championships	Budapest, Hungary
2018 Yaşar Doğu DNP at 92 kg
Loss	48-14	(Turkey) Serdar Böke	2-2	July 27–29, 2018	2018 Yaşar Doğu	Istanbul, Turkey
2018 Final X: Lehigh (gold) at 92 kg
Win	48-13	(United States) Hayden Zillmer	TF 10-0	June 22–23, 2018	2018 US World Team Trials	(United States) Lincoln, Nebraska
Win	47-13	(United States) Hayden Zillmer	5–2	June 22–23, 2018	2018 US World Team Trials	(United States) Lincoln, Nebraska
Win	46-13	(Cuba) Yurieski Torreblanca	2-1	May 17, 2018	2018 Beat The Streets: Team USA vs. Team Cuba	(United States) New York City, New York
2018 US Open (gold) at 92 kg
Win	45-13	(United States) Hayden Zillmer	2-0	April 24–28, 2018	2018 US Open National Wrestling Championships	(United States) Las Vegas, Nevada
Win	44-13	(United States) Deron Winn	3-0	April 24–28, 2018	2018 US Open National Wrestling Championships	(United States) Las Vegas, Nevada
Win	43-13	(United States) Tanner Orndorff	TF 10-0	April 24–28, 2018	2018 US Open National Wrestling Championships	(United States) Las Vegas, Nevada
Win	42-13	(United States) Jeremiah Imonode	TF 10-0	April 24–28, 2018	2018 US Open National Wrestling Championships	(United States) Las Vegas, Nevada
2018 World Cup (gold) as Team USA
Loss	41-13	(Azerbaijan) Aslanbek Alborov	4-4	April 7–8, 2018	2018 Wrestling World Cup - Men's freestyle	(United States) Iowa City, Iowa
Loss	41-12	(Georgia (country)) Dato Marsagishvili	0-5	April 7–8, 2018	2018 Wrestling World Cup - Men's freestyle	(United States) Iowa City, Iowa
Win	41-11	(Japan) Takashi Ishiguro	TF 11-0	April 7–8, 2018	2018 Wrestling World Cup - Men's freestyle	(United States) Iowa City, Iowa
2018 International Ukrainian Tournament (silver) at 92 kg
Loss	40-11	(Azerbaijan) Sharif Sharifov	7-8	February 23–25, 2018	XXII Outstanding Ukrainian Wrestlers and Coaches Memorial	Kyiv, Ukraine
Win	40-10	(United States) Riley Lefever	2-0	February 23–25, 2018	XXII Outstanding Ukrainian Wrestlers and Coaches Memorial	Kyiv, Ukraine
Win	39-10	(Lithuania) Edgarus Voitechovskij	7-1	February 23–25, 2018	XXII Outstanding Ukrainian Wrestlers and Coaches Memorial	Kyiv, Ukraine
Win	38-10	(Armenia) Shamir Atyan	TF 11-0	February 23–25, 2018	XXII Outstanding Ukrainian Wrestlers and Coaches Memorial	Kyiv, Ukraine
2017 World Championships (bronze) at 86 kg
Win	37-10	(Bulgaria) Mihail Ganev	8-0	August 25, 2017	2017 World Wrestling Championships	Paris, France
Loss	36-10	(Slovakia) Boris Makoev	3-6	August 25, 2017	2017 World Wrestling Championships	Paris, France
Win	36-9	(Poland) Zbigniew Baranowski	3-2	August 25, 2017	2017 World Wrestling Championships	Paris, France
Win	35-9	(Finland) Ville Heino	9-6	August 25, 2017	2017 World Wrestling Championships	Paris, France
Win	34-9	(Germany) Ahmed Dudarov	6-1	August 25, 2017	2017 World Wrestling Championships	Paris, France
2017 US World Team Trials (gold) at 86 kg
Win	33-9	(United States) David Taylor	5-3	June 10, 2017	2017 US World Team Trials	(United States) Lincoln, Nebraska
Win	32-9	(United States) David Taylor	4-3	June 10, 2017	2017 US World Team Trials	(United States) Lincoln, Nebraska
Loss	31-9	(United States) David Taylor	3-9	June 10, 2017	2017 US World Team Trials	(United States) Lincoln, Nebraska
2016 Summer Olympics (bronze) at 86 kg
Win	31-8	(Cuba) Reineris Salas	FF (3-1)	August 20, 2016	2016 Summer Olympics	Rio de Janeiro, Brazil
Loss	30-8	(Turkey) Selim Yaşar	1-2	August 20, 2016	2016 Summer Olympics	Rio de Janeiro, Brazil
Win	30-7	(Iran) Alireza Karimi	5-1	August 20, 2016	2016 Summer Olympics	Rio de Janeiro, Brazil
Win	29-7	(Belarus) Amarhajy Mahamedau	7-1	August 20, 2016	2016 Summer Olympics	Rio de Janeiro, Brazil
2016 Germany Grand Prix (bronze) at 86 kg
Win	28-7	(Kazakhstan) Adilet Davlumbayev	10-5	July 2–3, 2016	2016 Grand Prix of Germany	Dortmund, Germany
Win	27-7	(Germany) Konstantin Voelk	Fall	July 2–3, 2016	2016 Grand Prix of Germany	Dortmund, Germany
Loss	26-7	(Azerbaijan) Sharif Sharifov	2-6	July 2–3, 2016	2016 Grand Prix of Germany	Dortmund, Germany
Win	26-6	(Kazakhstan) Kanat Berdiyev	TF 10–0	July 2–3, 2016	2016 Grand Prix of Germany	Dortmund, Germany
2016 World Cup 4th as Team USA
Loss	25-6	(Georgia (country)) Dato Marsagishvili	4-7	June 11–12, 2016	2016 Wrestling World Cup – Men's freestyle	(United States) Los Angeles, California
Win	25-5	(Azerbaijan) Aleksander Gostiev	3-2	June 11–12, 2016	2016 Wrestling World Cup – Men's freestyle	(United States) Los Angeles, California
Win	24-5	(Iran) Alireza Karimi	6-2	June 11–12, 2016	2016 Wrestling World Cup – Men's freestyle	(United States) Los Angeles, California
Win	23-5	(India) Pawan Kumar	TF 10-0	June 11–12, 2016	2016 Wrestling World Cup – Men's freestyle	(United States) Los Angeles, California
Win	22-5	(Iran) Meisam Mostafa-Jokar	10-5	May 19, 2016	2016 Beat The Streets: United In The Square	(United States) New York City, New York
2016 World Olympic Qualification I (gold) at 86 kg
Win	21-5	(Venezuela) Pedro Ceballos	6-0	April 24, 2016	2016 World Wrestling Olympic Qualification Tournament 1	Ulaanbaatar, Mongolia
Win	20-5	(Uzbekistan) Umidjon Ismanov	5-2	April 24, 2016	2016 World Wrestling Olympic Qualification Tournament 1	Ulaanbaatar, Mongolia
Win	19-5	(Poland) Zbigniew Baranowski	4-1	April 24, 2016	2016 World Wrestling Olympic Qualification Tournament 1	Ulaanbaatar, Mongolia
Win	18-5	(Greece) Timofei Xenidis	TF 10-0	April 24, 2016	2016 World Wrestling Olympic Qualification Tournament 1	Ulaanbaatar, Mongolia
Win	17-5	(Armenia) Shamir Atyan	TF 11-0	April 24, 2016	2016 World Wrestling Olympic Qualification Tournament 1	Ulaanbaatar, Mongolia
2016 US Olympic Team Trials (gold) 86 kg
Win	16-5	(United States) Kyle Dake	5-3	April 10, 2016	2016 US Olympic Team Trials	(United States) Iowa City, Iowa
Loss	15-5	(United States) Kyle Dake	3-5	April 10, 2016	2016 US Olympic Team Trials	(United States) Iowa City, Iowa
Win	15-4	(United States) Kyle Dake	8-1	April 10, 2016	2016 US Olympic Team Trials	(United States) Iowa City, Iowa
Win	14-4	(United States) Keith Gavin	3-1	April 10, 2016	2016 US Olympic Team Trials Challenge	(United States) Iowa City, Iowa
Win	13-4	(United States) Jake Herbert	8-1	April 10, 2016	2016 US Olympic Team Trials Challenge	(United States) Iowa City, Iowa
Win	12-4	(United States) Clayton Foster	7-7	April 10, 2016	2016 US Olympic Team Trials Challenge	(United States) Iowa City, Iowa
2015 US Senior Nationals 4th at 97 kg
Win	11-4	(United States) Wynn Michalak	4-1	May 7–9, 2015	2015 US Senior National Championships	(United States) Las Vegas, Nevada
Loss	10-4	(United States) Kyle Snyder	3-4	May 7–9, 2015	2015 US Senior National Championships	(United States) Las Vegas, Nevada
Win	10-3	(United States) Cayle Byers	4-0	May 7–9, 2015	2015 US Senior National Championships	(United States) Las Vegas, Nevada
Win	9-3	(United States) David Zabriskie	9-5	May 7–9, 2015	2015 US Senior National Championships	(United States) Las Vegas, Nevada
Win	8-3	(United States) Josh Manu	11-4	May 7–9, 2015	2015 US Senior National Championships	(United States) Las Vegas, Nevada
2014 US World Team Trials at 97 kg
Loss	7-3	(United States) J. D. Bergman	2-4	May 29, 2014	2014 US World Team Trials Challenge	(United States) Madison, Wisconsin
Loss	7-2	(United States) Deron Winn	2-10	May 29, 2014	2014 US World Team Trials Challenge	(United States) Madison, Wisconsin
Win	7-1	(United States) Wynn Michalak	5-0	May 29, 2014	2014 US World Team Trials Challenge	(United States) Madison, Wisconsin
Win	6-1	(United States) Jack Jensen	8-0	May 29, 2014	2014 US World Team Trials Challenge	(United States) Madison, Wisconsin
2014 US University Nationals (bronze) at 97 kg
Win	5-1	(United States) Alex Polizzi	TF 12-2	May 22–25, 2014	2014 US University National Championships	(United States) Akron, Ohio
Loss	4-1	(United States) Lucas Sheridan	Fall	May 22–25, 2014	2014 US University National Championships	(United States) Akron, Ohio
Win	4-0	(United States) Matt Meadows	TF 11-0	May 22–25, 2014	2014 US University National Championships	(United States) Akron, Ohio
Win	3-0	(United States) Mike Fetchet	TF 10-0	May 22–25, 2014	2014 US University National Championships	(United States) Akron, Ohio
Win	2-0	(United States) Brandon Litten	TF 10-0	May 22–25, 2014	2014 US University National Championships	(United States) Akron, Ohio
Win	1-0	(United States) Alec Brown	TF 11-0	May 22–25, 2014	2014 US University National Championships	(United States) Akron, Ohio
