= 2022 Wrestling World Cup – Men's freestyle =

Men's freestyle at the 2022 Wrestling World Cup
- Venue: Xtream Arena
- Location: Coralville, Iowa, United States
- Dates: 10–11 December
- Competitors: 74
- Teams: 6

Medalists
gold medal	United States
silver medal	Iran
bronze medal	All-World Team

The 2022 Wrestling World Cup - Men's freestyle was the first Wrestling World Cup in 2022 which took place in Coralville, Iowa, United States on December 10–11, 2022.

== Pool stage ==
Teams qualified for the 1st place match
Teams qualified for the 3rd place match

=== Pool A ===
Pos	Team	Pld	W	L	CP	TP
1	United States	2	2	0	67	130
2	Georgia	2	1	1	36	64
3	Mongolia	2	0	2	24	57

Source: UWW

POOL A
Round I

United States 7 – 3 Mongolia
Weight	United States	result	Mongolia
57 kg	Zane Richards	10 – 0	Zandanbudyn Zanabazar
61 kg	Daniel DeShazer	WO –	-none 61 kg-
65 kg	Yianni Diakomihalis	3 – 10	Tömör-Ochiryn Tulga
70 kg	Tyler Berger	10 – 0	Züünbayangiin Mönkhtulga
74 kg	Vincenzo Joseph	0 – 8	Zandanbudyn Sumiyaabazar
79 kg	Jordan Burroughs	10 – 0	Mendbilegiin Temüüjin
86 kg	Zahid Valencia	10 – 0	Bayasgalangiin Bat-Erdene
92 kg	Nate Jackson	WO –	-none 92 kg-
97 kg	Kyle Snyder	WO –	Ölziisaikhany Batzul
125 kg	Hayden Zillmer	1 – 3	Mönkhtöriin Lkhagvagerel

Round II

Mongolia 3 – 7 Georgia
Weight	Mongolia	result	Georgia
57 kg	Zandanbudyn Zanabazar	9 – 6	Beka Bujiashvili
61 kg	-none 61 kg-	– WO	Teimuraz Vanishvili
65 kg	Tömör-Ochiryn Tulga	11 – 0	Beka Lomtadze
70 kg	Damdinbazaryn Tsogtbaatar	1 – 11	Giorgi Elbakidze
74 kg	Zandanbudyn Sumiyaabazar	4 – 9^{F}	Giorgi Sulava
79 kg	Batchuluuny Batmagnai	2 – 12	Vladimer Gamkrelidze
86 kg	Bayasgalangiin Bat-Erdene	1 – 8	Sandro Aminashvili
92 kg	-none 92 kg-	– WO	Miriani Maisuradze
97 kg	Ölziisaikhany Batzul	– WO	Givi Matcharashvili
125 kg	Mönkhtöriin Lkhagvagerel	8^{F} – 1	Solomon Manashvili

Round III

Georgia 0 – 10 United States
Weight	Georgia	result	United States
57 kg	Beka Bujiashvili	3 – 6	Nick Suriano
61 kg	Teimuraz Vanishvili	0 – 11	Seth Gross
65 kg	Beka Lomtadze	0 – 11	Yianni Diakomihalis
70 kg	Giorgi Elbakidze	0 – 8	Alec Pantaleo
74 kg	Giorgi Sulava	0 – 10	Jason Nolf
79 kg	Vladimer Gamkrelidze	3 – 5	Jordan Burroughs
86 kg	Sandro Aminashvili	0 – 11	Zahid Valencia
92 kg	Miriani Maisuradze	4 – 10	Nate Jackson
97 kg	Givi Matcharashvili	0 – 6	Kyle Snyder
125 kg	Solomon Manashvili	7 – 8	Hayden Zillmer

=== Pool B ===
Pos	Team	Pld	W	L	CP	TP
1	Iran	2	2	0	57	143
2	All-World Team	1	1	0	48	120
3	Japan	2	0	2	15	41

Source: UWW

POOL B
Round I

Iran 9 – 1 Japan
Weight	Iran	result	Japan
57 kg	Reza Momeni	6 – 5	Taichi Yamaguchi
61 kg	Ebrahim Elahi	2 – 13	Kaito Morikawa
65 kg	Mohammad Reza Bagheri	2 – 1	Ryoma Anraku
70 kg	Ali Akbar Fazli	9 – 6	Keitaro Ono
74 kg	Mohammad Sadegh Firouzpour	3 – 1	Kirin Kinoshita
79 kg	Ali Savadkouhi	11 – 0	Yajuro Yamasaki
86 kg	Alireza Karimi	11 – 0	Tatsuya Shirai
92 kg	Kamran Ghasempour	10 – 0	Satoshi Miura
97 kg	Amir Ali Azarpira	13 – 2	Yohei Shinada
125 kg	Amir Reza Masoumi	10 – 0	Hiroto Ninomiya

Round II

Japan 1 – 9 All-World Team
Weight	Japan	result	All-World Team
57 kg	Taichi Yamaguchi	0 – 3	Zelimkhan Abakarov
61 kg	Kaito Morikawa	10 – 0	Georgi Vangelov
65 kg	Ryoma Anraku	1 – 4	Taiyrbek Zhumashbek Uulu
70 kg	Keitaro Ono	0 – 11	Ernazar Akmataliev
74 kg	Kirin Kinoshita	0 – 10	Tajmuraz Salkazanov
79 kg	Yajuro Yamasaki	2 – 5	Arsalan Budazhapov
86 kg	Tatsuya Shirai	0 – 11	Azamat Dauletbekov
92 kg	Satoshi Miura	0 – 10	Osman Nurmagomedov
97 kg	Yohei Shinada	0 – 10	Batyrbek Tsakulov
125 kg	Hiroto Ninomiya	0 – 11	Oleksandr Khotsianivskyi

Round III

All-World Team 4 – 6 Iran
Weight	All-World Team	result	Iran
57 kg	Zelimkhan Abakarov	12 – 2	Reza Momeni
61 kg	Georgi Vangelov	5 – 1	Ebrahim Elahi
65 kg	Taiyrbek Zhumashbek Uulu	0 – 5	Rahman Amouzad
70 kg	Ernazar Akmataliev	7 – 10	Amir Mohammad Yazdani
74 kg	Tajmuraz Salkazanov	9 – 0	Mohammad Sadegh Firouzpour
79 kg	Arsalan Budazhapov	2 – 12	Mohammad Nokhodi
86 kg	Azamat Dauletbekov	0 – 4	Alireza Karimi
92 kg	Osman Nurmagomedov	10 – 10	Amir Hossein Firouzpour
97 kg	Batyrbek Tsakulov	0 – 10	Amir Ali Azarpira
125 kg	Oleksandr Khotsianivskyi	0 – 12	Amir Reza Masoumi

== Medal Matches ==
Medal Matches
First-Place Match

United States 6 – 4 Iran
Weight	United States	result	Iran
57 kg	Zane Richards	6 – 2	Reza Momeni
61 kg	Seth Gross	10 – 0	Ebrahim Elahi
65 kg	Yianni Diakomihalis	4 – 5	Rahman Amouzad
70 kg	Alec Pantaleo	4 – 3	Amir Mohammad Yazdani
74 kg	Jason Nolf	1 – 2	Mohammad Sadegh Firouzpour
79 kg	Jordan Burroughs	6 – 6	Ali Savadkouhi
86 kg	Zahid Valencia	5 – 3	Alireza Karimi
92 kg	Nate Jackson	8 – 4	Amir Hossein Firouzpour
97 kg	Kyle Snyder	5 – 0	Kamran Ghasempour
125 kg	Hayden Zillmer	1 – 6	Amir Reza Masoumi

Third-Place Match

Georgia 2 – 8 All-World Team
Weight	Georgia	result	All-World Team
57 kg	Beka Bujiashvili	1 – 4	Zelimkhan Abakarov
61 kg	Teimuraz Vanishvili	– WO	Georgi Vangelov
65 kg	Beka Lomtadze	4 – 14	Taiyrbek Zhumashbek Uulu
70 kg	Giorgi Elbakidze	3 – 4	Ernazar Akmataliev
74 kg	Giorgi Sulava	0 – 10	Tajmuraz Salkazanov
79 kg	Vladimer Gamkrelidze	12 – 2	Arsalan Budazhapov
86 kg	Sandro Aminashvili	1 – 4	Azamat Dauletbekov
92 kg	Miriani Maisuradze	0 – 3	Osman Nurmagomedov
97 kg	Givi Matcharashvili	7 – 7	Batyrbek Tsakulov
125 kg	Solomon Manashvili	WO –	Oleksandr Khotsianivskyi

== Final ranking ==
Team	Pld	W	L
United States	3	3	0
Iran	3	2	1
All-World Team	3	2	1
Georgia	3	1	2
Mongolia	2	0	2
Japan	2	0	2

== See also ==
- 2022 Wrestling World Cup - Men's Greco-Roman
- 2022 Wrestling World Cup - Women's freestyle
