= 2021 World Wrestling Championships – Men's freestyle 92 kg =

Wrestling competitions

Men's freestyle 92 kg at the 2021 World Championships
- Venue: Nye Jordal Amfi
- Dates: 3–4 October 2021
- Competitors: 20 from 20 nations

Medalists
gold medal	Kamran Ghasempour	Iran
silver medal	Magomed Kurbanov	RWF
bronze medal	Osman Nurmagomedov	Azerbaijan
bronze medal	J'den Cox	United States

The men's freestyle 92 kilograms is a competition featured at the 2021 World Wrestling Championships, and was held in Oslo, Norway on 3 and 4 October.

This freestyle wrestling competition consists of a single-elimination tournament, with a repechage used to determine the winner of two bronze medals. The two finalists face off for gold and silver medals. Each wrestler who loses to one of the two finalists moves into the repechage, culminating in a pair of bronze medal matches featuring the semifinal losers each facing the remaining repechage opponent from their half of the bracket.

== Results ==
Legend

- F — Won by fall
- WO — Won by walkover

=== Final ===
Final
Magomed Kurbanov (RWF)	4
Kamran Ghasempour (IRI)	8

=== Top half ===
Round of 32

Round of 16
Magomed Kurbanov (RWF)	WO
Gwon Hyeok-beom (KOR)
Georgii Rubaev (MDA)	3
Amarhajy Mahamedau (BLR)	6
Zbigniew Baranowski (POL)	8
Erhan Yaylacı (TUR)	1
Pruthviraj Patil (IND)	0
Osman Nurmagomedov (AZE)	10

Quarterfinals
Magomed Kurbanov (RWF)	9
Amarhajy Mahamedau (BLR)	0
Zbigniew Baranowski (POL)	3
Osman Nurmagomedov (AZE)	7

Semifinals
Magomed Kurbanov (RWF)	7
Osman Nurmagomedov (AZE)	4

=== Bottom half ===
Round of 32
Dagvadorjiin Orgilokh (MGL)	2
J'den Cox (USA)	13
Irakli Mtsituri (GEO)	4
Takuma Otsu (JPN)	4
Akhmed Magamaev (BUL)	10
John Omondi (KEN)	0
Andriy Vlasov (UKR)	10
Heriberto Sandi (CRC)	0

Round of 16
Jérémy Poirier (CAN)	5^{F}
Gilberto Ayala (VEN)	0
Simone Iannattoni (ITA)	0
J'den Cox (USA)	10
Irakli Mtsituri (GEO)	2
Akhmed Magamaev (BUL)	0
Andriy Vlasov (UKR)	0
Kamran Ghasempour (IRI)	7

Quarterfinals
Jérémy Poirier (CAN)	0
J'den Cox (USA)	10
Irakli Mtsituri (GEO)	1
Kamran Ghasempour (IRI)	8

Semifinals
J'den Cox (USA)	3
Kamran Ghasempour (IRI)	3

=== Repechage ===
Repechage round 2
Gwon Hyeok-beom (KOR)
Amarhajy Mahamedau (BLR)	WO
Andriy Vlasov (UKR)	8
Irakli Mtsituri (GEO)	2

Bronze medals
Amarhajy Mahamedau (BLR)	0
Osman Nurmagomedov (AZE)	2
Andriy Vlasov (UKR)	0
J'den Cox (USA)	11

== Final standing ==
Rank	Athlete
1st place, gold medalist(s)	Kamran Ghasempour (IRI)
2nd place, silver medalist(s)	Magomed Kurbanov (RWF)
3rd place, bronze medalist(s)	Osman Nurmagomedov (AZE)
3rd place, bronze medalist(s)	J'den Cox (USA)
5	Amarhajy Mahamedau (BLR)
5	Andriy Vlasov (UKR)
7	Irakli Mtsituri (GEO)
8	Jérémy Poirier (CAN)
9	Akhmed Magamaev (BUL)
10	Zbigniew Baranowski (POL)
11	Takuma Otsu (JPN)
12	Georgii Rubaev (MDA)
13	Dagvadorjiin Orgilokh (MGL)
14	Erhan Yaylacı (TUR)
15	Gwon Hyeok-beom (KOR)
16	Gilberto Ayala (VEN)
17	Pruthviraj Patil (IND)
18	Simone Iannattoni (ITA)
19	John Omondi (KEN)
20	Heriberto Sandi (CRC)
