= Kamran Ghasempour =

Iranian freestyle wrestler

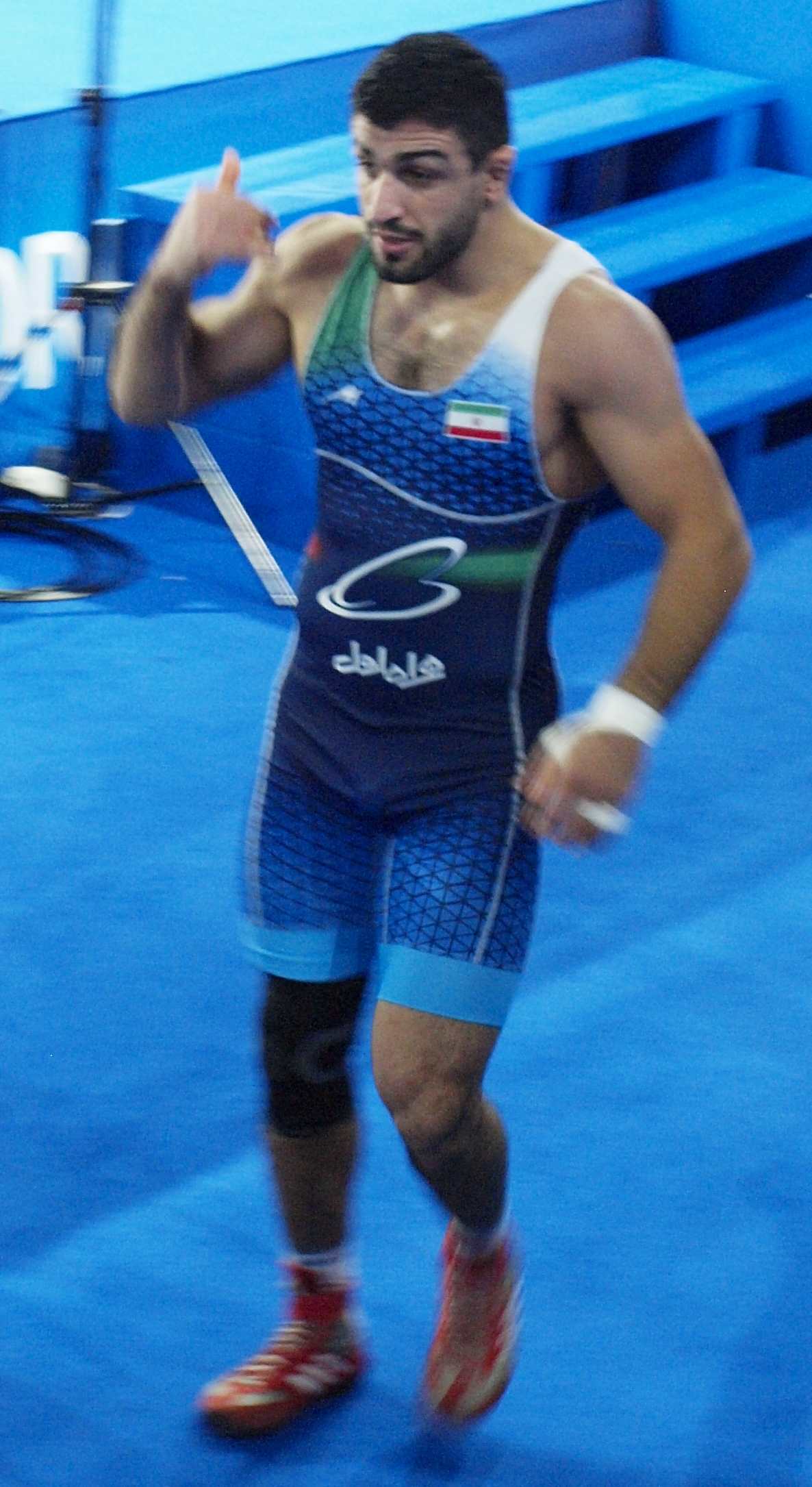
- Kamran Ghasempour at the 2024 World Wrestling Championships in Tirana, Norway

Personal information
- Native name: کامران قاسم پور
- Nickname: Gladiator
- Nationality: Iran
- Born: 16 December 1996 (age 29) Jouybar, Mazandaran, Iran
- Home town: Bizaki, Jouybar
- Height: 181 cm (5 ft 11 in)
- Weight: 91 kg (201 lb)

Sport
- Country: Iran
- Sport: Wrestling
- Weight class: 92 kg
- Rank: 1
- Event: Freestyle
- Club: Sanaye Mazandaran
- Coached by: Hossein Naghibi
Medal record
Men's freestyle wrestling
Representing Iran
World Championships
Gold medal – first place	2021 Oslo	92 kg
Gold medal – first place	2022 Belgrade	92 kg
Bronze medal – third place	2025 Zagreb	86 kg
Asian Championships
Gold medal – first place	2019 Xi'an	86 kg
Gold medal – first place	2021 Almaty	92 kg
Gold medal – first place	2026 Bishkek	86 kg
Islamic Solidarity Games
Bronze medal – third place	2025 Riyadh	86 kg
World Cup
Silver medal – second place	2022 Coralville	Team
Bolat Turlykhanov Cup
Gold medal – first place	2022 Almaty	92 kg
World U23 Championships
Gold medal – first place	2018 Bucharest	86 kg
Gold medal – first place	2019 Budapest	86 kg
World Cadets Championships
Silver medal – second place	2013 Zrenjanin	69 kg
Asian Cadets Championships
Gold medal – first place	2013 Ulaanbaatar	69 kg

Kamran Ghasempour (Persian: کامران قاسمپور, born 16 Dec 1996) is an Iranian freestyle wrestler who competes at 92 kilograms, where he is a former world champion. He is also a two-time Asian Continental champion and a two-time World U23 Champion at 86 kilograms.

== Career ==
He won the gold medal in the men's 86 kg event at the 2018 World U23 Wrestling Championship in Bucharest, Romania and at the 2019 World U23 Wrestling Championship in Budapest, Hungary.

In 2019, he won the gold medal in the 86 kg event at the Asian Wrestling Championships held in Xi'an, China. He also secured the gold medal in the 92 kg event at the 2021 Asian Wrestling Championships held in Almaty, Kazakhstan.

He won the gold medal in the men's 92 kg event at the 2021 World Wrestling Championships held in Oslo, Norway. He also won the gold medal in the men's 92 kg event at the 2022 World Wrestling Championships held in Belgrade, Serbia.

On 30 December 2025, Ghasempour publicly supported the 2025–2026 Iranian protests on his Instagram, stating he did so "In the hope of resolving the people's problems and achieving a dignified life that is worthy of the name of Iran and Iranians."

== Achievements ==
Year	Tournament	Location	Result	Event
2019	Asian Championships	Xi'an, China	1st	Freestyle 86 kg
2021	Asian Championships	Almaty, Kazakhstan	1st	Freestyle 92 kg
2021	World Championships	Oslo, Norway	1st	Freestyle 92 kg
2022	World Championships	Belgrade, Serbia	1st	Freestyle 92 kg
2025	World Championships	Zagreb, Croatia	3rd	Freestyle 86 kg

== Freestyle record ==
Senior Freestyle Matches
Res.	Record	Opponent	Score	Date	Event	Location
2022 Imam Memorial Premier Cup (bronze) for Anbuh sazane Hutan at 92 kg
Win	75–4	(Iran) Mehdi Hajiluiian	11–0	18 November 2022	2022 Imam Memorial Premier Cup	(Iran) Tehran
Win	74–4	(Iran) Mohammad Javad Ebrahimi	2–1	18 November 2022	2022 Imam Memorial Premier Cup	(Iran) Tehran
Win	73–4	(Iran) Ahmad Bazri	8–0	10 November 2022	2022 Imam Memorial Premier Cup	(Iran) Qaem Shahr
2022 World Championships (gold) at 92 kg
Win	72–4	(United States) J'den Cox	2–0	17 September 2022	2022 World Championships	Belgrade, Serbia
Win	71–4	(Georgia (country)) Miriani Maisuradze	5–0	16 September 2022	2022 World Championships	Belgrade, Serbia
Win	70–4	(Bulgaria) Akhmed Bataev	8–1	16 September 2022	2022 World Championships	Belgrade, Serbia
Win	69–4	(France) Adlan Viskhanov	TF 10–0	16 September 2022	2022 World Championships	Belgrade, Serbia
2022 Iran World Team Trials (gold) at 92 kg
Win	68–4	(Iran) Amir Hossein Firouzpour	4–0	10 July 2022	2022 Iranian World Team Trials	Tehran, Iran
2022 Bolat Turlykhanov Cup (gold) at 92 kg
Win	67–4	(Kazakhstan) Adilet Davlumbayev	TF 11–0	6 June 2022	Bolat Turlykhanov Cup	Almaty, Kazakhstan
Win	66–4	(Kazakhstan) Abdimanap Baigenzheyev	TF 11–0	6 June 2022	Bolat Turlykhanov Cup	Almaty, Kazakhstan
Win	65–4	(Kazakhstan) Islyambek Ilyassov	10-0, Fall	6 June 2022	Bolat Turlykhanov Cup	Almaty, Kazakhstan
Win	64–4	(India) Viky	TF 10–0	6 June 2022	Bolat Turlykhanov Cup	Almaty, Kazakhstan
2021 Imam Memorial Premier Cup (gold) for sanaye mazandaran at 86 kg
Win	63–4	(Iran) Reza Mozafari	7–2	12 November 2021	2021 Imam Memorial Premier Cup	Sari, Iran
Win	62–4	(Iran) Arash Nirabadi	7–0	29 October 2021	2021 Imam Memorial Premier Cup	Juybar, Iran
2021 World Championships (gold) at 92 kg
Win	61–4	(Russia) Magomed Kurbanov	8–4	4 October 2021	2021 World Championships	Oslo, Norway
Win	60–4	(United States) J'den Cox	3–3	3 October 2021	2021 World Championships	Oslo, Norway
Win	59–4	(Georgia (country)) Irakli Mtsituri	8–1	3 October 2021	2021 World Championships	Oslo, Norway
Win	58–4	(Ukraine) Andriy Vlasov	7–0	3 October 2021	2021 World Championships	Oslo, Norway
2021 Iran World Team Trials (gold) at 92 kg
Win	57–4	(Iran) Mohammad Javad Ebrahimi	4–0	26 September 2021	2021 Iranian World Team Trials	Tehran, Iran
Win	56–4	(Iran) Mohammad Javad Ebrahimi	3–2	26 September 2021	2021 Iranian World Team Trials	Tehran, Iran
Loss	55–4	(Iran) Mohammad Javad Ebrahimi	1–2	26 September 2021	2021 Iranian World Team Trials	Tehran, Iran
2021 Asian Championships (gold) at 92 kg
Win	55–3	(Mongolia) Tsogtgerel Munkhbaatar	TF 10–0	18 April 2021	2021 Asian Continental Championships	Almaty, Kazakhstan
Win	54–3	(Uzbekistan) Rustam Shodiev	TF 11–0	18 April 2021	2021 Asian Continental Championships	Almaty, Kazakhstan
Win	53–3	(India) Sanjeet	TF 10–0	18 April 2021	2021 Asian Continental Championships	Almaty, Kazakhstan
2021 Iran Olympic Team Trials (silver) at 86 kg
Loss	52–3	(Iran) Hassan Yazdani	2–5	9 March 2021	2021 Iranian Olympic Team Trials	Tehran, Iran
2020 Imam Memorial Premier Cup (gold) for Grand Bazaar at 92 kg
Win		(Iran) Ali Mojerlou	inj 0-0	10–11 December 2020	2020 Imam Memorial Premier Cup	
Win	52–2	(Iran) Mohammad Ali Tabar	4–2	10–11 December 2020	2020 Imam Memorial Premier Cup	
2020 Iran World Cup Trials (gold) at 92 kg
Win	51–2	(Iran) Arashk Mohebi	6–2	4 November 2020	2020 Iranian Individual World Cup Trials	Tehran, Iran
Win	50–2	(Iran) Hossein Jalalinejad	6–0	4 November 2020	2020 Iranian Individual World Cup Trials	Tehran, Iran
Win	49–2	(Iran) Hossein Shahbazi	4–0	4 November 2020	2020 Iranian Individual World Cup Trials	Tehran, Iran
2020 Imam Memorial Premier Cup (gold) for Grand Bazaar at 86 kg
Win	48–2	(Iran) Hossein Nouri Safar	TF 10–0	6–7 October 2020	2020 Imam Memorial Premier Cup	Tehran, Iran
Win	47–2	(Iran) Arash Nirabadi	5–1	6–7 October 2020	2020 Imam Memorial Premier Cup	Tehran, Iran
Win	46–2	(Iran) Masoud Saedi Safar	TF 10–0	6–7 October 2020	2020 Imam Memorial Premier Cup	Tehran, Iran
2019 Iran Premier League at 86 kg
Win	45–2	(Iran) Jalal Zaman	2–0	December 2019	2019 Iranian Premier League	Tehran, Iran
Win	44–2	(Iran) Ali Mojerlou	3–0	December 2019	2019 Iranian Premier League	Tehran, Iran
2019 World Clubs Cup (gold) for Iran Mall at 86 kg
Win	43–2	(Iran) Mersad Morghzari	TF 11–0	19–20 December 2019	2019 World Clubs Cup	Bojnord, Iran
Win		(India) Deepak Punia	inj 0-0	19–20 December 2019	2019 World Clubs Cup	Bojnord, Iran
Win	42–2	(China) Alatangalida	TF 10–0	19–20 December 2019	2019 World Clubs Cup	Bojnord, Iran
Win	41–2	(Georgia (country)) Maisuradze Tarzan	9–0	19–20 December 2019	2019 World Clubs Cup	Bojnord, Iran
2019 World U23 Championships (gold) at 86 kg
Win	40–2	(Azerbaijan) Gadzhimurad Magomedsaidov	9–3	30 October 2019	2019 World U23 Championships	Bucharest, Romania
Win	39–2	(Turkey) Osman Göçen	4–4	29 October 2019	2019 World U23 Championships	Bucharest, Romania
Win	38–2	(Mongolia) Ganbaataryn Gankhuyag	3–0	29 October 2019	2019 World U23 Championships	Bucharest, Romania
Win	37–2	(Poland) Krzysztof Sadowik	6–0	29 October 2019	2019 World U23 Championships	Bucharest, Romania
Win	36–2	(Armenia) Hovhannes Mkhitaryan	5–0	29 October 2019	2019 World U23 Championships	Bucharest, Romania
2019 Tbilisi Grand Prix (gold) at 86 kg
Win	35–2	(Azerbaijan) Gadzhimurad Magomedsaidov	TF 10–0	10 August 2019	2019 Tbilisi Grand Prix of Balavadze and Kartozia	(Georgia (country)) Tbilisi, Georgia
Win	34–2	(Georgia (country)) Tarzan Maisuradze	8–1	9 August 2019	2019 Tbilisi Grand Prix of Balavadze and Kartozia	(Georgia (country)) Tbilisi, Georgia
Win	33–2	(Georgia (country)) Sandro Aminashvili	TF 11–1	9 August 2019	2019 Tbilisi Grand Prix of Balavadze and Kartozia	(Georgia (country)) Tbilisi, Georgia
Win	32–2	(Azerbaijan) Ozkhan Abasov	TF 10–0	9 August 2019	2019 Tbilisi Grand Prix of Balavadze and Kartozia	(Georgia (country)) Tbilisi, Georgia
2019 Iran World Team Trials (silver) at 86 kg
Loss	31–2	(Iran) Hassan Yazdani	3–6	1 July 2019	2019 Iranian World Team Trials	Tehran, Iran
2019 Asian Championships (gold) at 86 kg
Win	31–1	(Kyrgyzstan) Aligadzhi Gamidgadzhiev	TF 10–0	24 April 2019	2019 Asian Continental Championships	Xi'an, China
Win	30–1	(India) Deepak Punia	TF 10–0	24 April 2019	2019 Asian Continental Championships	Xi'an, China
Win	29–1	(Tajikistan) Bakhodur Kodirov	TF 10–0	24 April 2019	2019 Asian Continental Championships	Xi'an, China
2019 Takhti Cup (gold) at 86 kg
Win	28–1	(Iran) Ahmad Bazri	6–0	7–8 February 2019	2019 Takhi Cup	Kermanshah, Iran
Win	27–1	(Iran) Masoud Madadi	INJ (3–0)	7–8 February 2019	2019 Takhi Cup	Kermanshah, Iran
Win	26–1	(Iran) Mersad Marghzari	TF 10–0	7–8 February 2019	2019 Takhi Cup	Kermanshah, Iran
Win	25–1	(Azerbaijan) Magomedgadzhi Khatiyev	6–0	7–8 February 2019	2019 Takhi Cup	Kermanshah, Iran
2018 World Clubs Cup (gold) for Bimeh Razi at 86 kg
Win	24–1	(Ukraine) Andrii Gyka	TF 10–0	7 December 2018	2018 World Clubs Cup	Babol, Iran
2018 World U23 Championships (gold) at 86 kg
Win	23–1	(Russia) Artur Naifonov	4–1	18 November 2018	2018 World U23 Championships	Bucharest, Romania
Win	22–1	(Mongolia) Ganbaataryn Gankhuyag	4–0	17 November 2018	2018 World U23 Championships	Bucharest, Romania
Win	21–1	(Turkey) Arif Özen	TF 10–0	17 November 2018	2018 World U23 Championships	Bucharest, Romania
Win	20–1	(Germany) Lars Schaefle	TF 10–0	17 November 2018	2018 World U23 Championships	Bucharest, Romania
2018 Iran World Team Trials (silver) at 86 kg
Loss	19–1	(Iran) Hassan Yazdani	2–8	10 May 2018	2018 Iran World Team Trials	(Iran) Tehran
Win	19–0	(Iran) Ahmad Bazri	7–4	10 May 2018	2018 Iran World Team Trials	(Iran) Tehran
Win	18–0	(Iran) Alireza Karimi	5–0	10 May 2018	2018 Iran World Team Trials	(Iran) Tehran
2018 Ukrainian Memorial (gold) at 86 kg
Win	17–0	(United States) Richard Perry	4–1	23–25 February 2018	XXII Outstanding Ukrainian Wrestlers and Coaches Memorial	Kyiv, Ukraine
Win	16–0	(Italy) Shamil Kudiyamagomedov	6–2	23–25 February 2018	XXII Outstanding Ukrainian Wrestlers and Coaches Memorial	Kyiv, Ukraine
Win	15–0	(Switzerland) Stefan Reichmuth	9–0	23–25 February 2018	XXII Outstanding Ukrainian Wrestlers and Coaches Memorial	Kyiv, Ukraine
Win	14–0	(Azerbaijan) Aleksandr Gostiyev	5–3	23–25 February 2018	XXII Outstanding Ukrainian Wrestlers and Coaches Memorial	Kyiv, Ukraine
Win	13–0	(Azerbaijan) Kanan Aliyev	TF 11–0	23–25 February 2018	XXII Outstanding Ukrainian Wrestlers and Coaches Memorial	Kyiv, Ukraine
2018 Takhi Cup (gold) at 86 kg
Win	12–0	(Turkey) Ahmet Bilici	5–4	8–9 February 2018	2018 Takhi Cup	Tabriz, Iran
Win	11–0	(Turkey) Osman Göçen	10–4	8–9 February 2018	2018 Takhi Cup	Tabriz, Iran
Win	10–0	(Azerbaijan) Gadzhimurad Magomedsaidov	8–5	8–9 February 2018	2018 Takhi Cup	Tabriz, Iran
Win	9–0	(Kazakhstan) Saken Aitzhanov	7–4	8–9 February 2018	2018 Takhi Cup	Tabriz, Iran
2017 Iran Premier League DNP for at 86 kg
Win	8–0	(Iran) Ezzatollah Akbari	8–6	2017	2017 Iran League	(Iran) Kiasar
2017 Dmitri Korkin (gold) at 86 kg
Win	7–0	(India) Deepak Punia	6–0	1 October 2017	2017 Dmitri Korkin Grand Prix	Yakutsk, Russia
Win	6–0	(Iran) Ismail Mahmoudi	2–1	1 October 2017	2017 Dmitri Korkin Grand Prix	Yakutsk, Russia
Win	5–0	(Uzbekistan) Solif Dam	TF 10–0	1 October 2017	2017 Dmitri Korkin Grand Prix	Yakutsk, Russia
2017 Iran Nationals (gold) at 86 kg
Win	4–0	(Iran) Ezzatollah Akbari	6–0	2017	2017 Iran Nationals	(Iran) Tehran
Win	3–0	(Iran) Massoud Madadi	5–4	2017	2017 Iran Nationals	(Iran) Tehran
Win	2–0	(Iran) Dezi Rupileh Yarmaz	Fall	2017	2017 Iran Nationals	(Iran) Tehran
Win	1–0	(Iran) Hashnamark Rima	5–4	2017	2017 Iran Nationals	(Iran) Tehran
