= 2018 World Wrestling Championships – Men's freestyle 92 kg =

Men's freestyle 92 kg at the 2018 World Championships
- Venue: László Papp Budapest Sports Arena
- Dates: 21–22 October 2018
- Competitors: 21 from 21 nations

Medalists
gold medal	J'den Cox	United States
silver medal	Ivan Yankouski	Belarus
bronze medal	Atsushi Matsumoto	Japan
bronze medal	Alireza Karimi	Iran

The men's freestyle 92 kilograms is a competition featured at the 2018 World Wrestling Championships, and was held in Budapest, Hungary on 21 and 22 October.

This freestyle wrestling competition consists of a single-elimination tournament, with a repechage used to determine the winner of two bronze medals. The two finalists face off for gold and silver medals. Each wrestler who loses to one of the two finalists moves into the repechage, culminating in a pair of bronze medal matches featuring the semifinal losers each facing the remaining repechage opponent from their half of the bracket.

J'den Cox from the United States won the gold medal.

== Results ==
=== Final ===
Final
Ivan Yankouski (BLR)	1
J'den Cox (USA)	4

=== Top half ===
Round of 32

Round of 16
Serdar Böke (TUR)	5
Atsushi Matsumoto (JPN)	7
Liubomyr Sagaliuk (UKR)	4
Deepak Punia (IND)	0
Lee Jong-ku (KOR)	0
Ivan Yankouski (BLR)	7
Luvsandorjiin Turtogtokh (MGL)	2
Nurgali Nurgaipuly (KAZ)	1

Quarterfinals
Atsushi Matsumoto (JPN)	3
Liubomyr Sagaliuk (UKR)	2
Ivan Yankouski (BLR)	10
Luvsandorjiin Turtogtokh (MGL)	0

Semifinals
Atsushi Matsumoto (JPN)	0
Ivan Yankouski (BLR)	11

=== Bottom half ===
Round of 32
Nicolae Ceban (MDA)	6
Gábor Hatos (HUN)	0
Jacob Luczak (CAN)	12
Dominic Peter (AUT)	6
Batyrbek Tsakulov (RUS)	10
Sun Xiao (CHN)	0
Sebastian Jezierzański (POL)	11
Azizbek Soliev (UZB)	6
Alireza Karimi (IRI)	13
Ricardo Báez (ARG)	0

Round of 16
Dato Marsagishvili (GEO)	2
J'den Cox (USA)	6
Nicolae Ceban (MDA)	10
Jacob Luczak (CAN)	0
Batyrbek Tsakulov (RUS)	8
Sebastian Jezierzański (POL)	0
Alireza Karimi (IRI)	7
Sharif Sharifov (AZE)	0

Quarterfinals
J'den Cox (USA)	6
Nicolae Ceban (MDA)	0
Batyrbek Tsakulov (RUS)	1
Alireza Karimi (IRI)	12

Semifinals
J'den Cox (USA)	5
Alireza Karimi (IRI)	2

=== Repechage ===
Repechage round 2
Lee Jong-ku (KOR)	0
Luvsandorjiin Turtogtokh (MGL)	4
Dato Marsagishvili (GEO)	8
Nicolae Ceban (MDA)	0

Bronze medals
Luvsandorjiin Turtogtokh (MGL)	5
Atsushi Matsumoto (JPN)	6
Dato Marsagishvili (GEO)	1
Alireza Karimi (IRI)	12
