= 2022 World Wrestling Championships – Men's freestyle 92 kg =

Men's freestyle 92 kg at the 2022 World Championships
- Venue: Štark Arena
- Dates: 16–17 September 2022
- Competitors: 23 from 23 nations

Medalists
gold medal	Kamran Ghasempour	Iran
silver medal	J'den Cox	United States
bronze medal	Miriani Maisuradze	Georgia
bronze medal	Osman Nurmagomedov	Azerbaijan

The men's freestyle 92 kilograms was a competition at the 2022 World Wrestling Championships. It was held in Belgrade, Serbia on 16 and 17 September 2022.

This freestyle wrestling competition consisted of a single-elimination tournament, with a repechage used to determine the winner of two bronze medals. The two finalists faced off for gold and silver medals. Each wrestler who lost to one of the two finalists moved into the repechage, culminating in a pair of bronze medal matches featuring the two semifinal losers, each facing the remaining repechage opponent from their half of the bracket.

== Results ==
Legend

- F — Won by fall
- WO — Won by walkover

=== Final ===
Final
Kamran Ghasempour (IRI)	2
J'den Cox (USA)	0

=== Top half ===
Round of 32
Richard DesChatelets (CAN)	0
Ganbaataryn Gankhuyag (MGL)	11
Kim Jin-myeong (KOR)	0
Sosuke Takatani (JPN)	10
Johannes Mayer (GER)	0
Illia Archaia (UKR)	13

Round of 16
Kamran Ghasempour (IRI)	10
Adlan Viskhanov (FRA)	0
Ganbaataryn Gankhuyag (MGL)	4
Akhmed Bataev (BUL)	5
Miriani Maisuradze (GEO)	2
Sosuke Takatani (JPN)	1
Illia Archaia (UKR)	4
Adilet Davlumbayev (KAZ)	5

Quarterfinals
Kamran Ghasempour (IRI)	7
Akhmed Bataev (BUL)	2
Miriani Maisuradze (GEO)	12
Adilet Davlumbayev (KAZ)	2

Semifinals
Kamran Ghasempour (IRI)	5
Miriani Maisuradze (GEO)	0

=== Bottom half ===
Round of 32
Johan Mostert (RSA)	2
Bi Yuxiang (CHN)	7
Vicky Hooda (IND)	3
Radosław Marcinkiewicz (POL)	4
Barthélémy Tshosha (COD)	0
Simone Iannattoni (ITA)	6^{F}
Strahinja Despić (SRB)	2
Maxwell Lacey (CRC)	12

Round of 16
J'den Cox (USA)	10
Bi Yuxiang (CHN)	0
Radosław Marcinkiewicz (POL)	WO
~~Georgii Rubaev (MDA)~~
Feyzullah Aktürk (TUR)	6
Simone Iannattoni (ITA)	0
Maxwell Lacey (CRC)	0
Osman Nurmagomedov (AZE)	10

Quarterfinals
J'den Cox (USA)	11
Radosław Marcinkiewicz (POL)	0
Feyzullah Aktürk (TUR)	0
Osman Nurmagomedov (AZE)	11

Semifinals
J'den Cox (USA)	7
Osman Nurmagomedov (AZE)	0

=== Repechage ===
Repechage round 2
Adlan Viskhanov (FRA)	0
Akhmed Bataev (BUL)	10
Bi Yuxiang (CHN)	0
Radosław Marcinkiewicz (POL)	11

Bronze medals
Akhmed Bataev (BUL)	10
Miriani Maisuradze (GEO)	12
Radosław Marcinkiewicz (POL)	0
Osman Nurmagomedov (AZE)	11

== Final standing ==
Rank	Athlete
1st place, gold medalist(s)	Kamran Ghasempour (IRI)
2nd place, silver medalist(s)	J'den Cox (USA)
3rd place, bronze medalist(s)	Osman Nurmagomedov (AZE)
3rd place, bronze medalist(s)	Miriani Maisuradze (GEO)
5	Akhmed Bataev (BUL)
5	Radosław Marcinkiewicz (POL)
7	Simone Iannattoni (ITA)
8	Illia Archaia (UKR)
9	Ganbaataryn Gankhuyag (MGL)
10	Sosuke Takatani (JPN)
11	Maxwell Lacey (CRC)
12	Adilet Davlumbayev (KAZ)
13	Bi Yuxiang (CHN)
14	Feyzullah Aktürk (TUR)
15	Vicky Hooda (IND)
16	Johan Mostert (RSA)
17	Strahinja Despić (SRB)
18	Barthélémy Tshosha (COD)
19	Kim Jin-myeong (KOR)
20	Richard DesChatelets (CAN)
21	Johannes Mayer (GER)
22	Adlan Viskhanov (FRA)
—	Georgii Rubaev (MDA)
