= Aslan Kakhidze =

Kazakhstani freestyle wrestler

Personal information
- Native name: Аслан Байрамалийович Кахидзе
- Full name: Kakhidze Aslan Bayramaliyevich
- National team: Kazakhstan
- Born: 28 October 1988 (age 37) Almaty Region, KazSSR, USSR
- Height: 183 cm (6 ft 0 in)
- Weight: 88 kg (194 lb)

Sport
- Country: Kazakhstan
- Sport: Wrestling
- Event: Freestyle wrestling
- Coached by: Atabek Aliyev (since 2003)
Medal record
Representing Kazakhstan
Asian Wrestling Championships
Silver medal – second place	Almaty 2014	Freestyle wrestling, 86 kg
Bronze medal – third place	Bangkok 2016	Freestyle wrestling, 86 kg

Aslan Kakhidze (Kazakh: Аслан Байрамалийович Кахидзе) (born October 28, 1988) is a Kazakhstani freestyle wrestler. He competed in the men's freestyle 86 kg event at the 2016 Summer Olympics, in which he was eliminated in the round of 32 by Amarhajy Mahamedau.
