= Ali Nazari Juybari =

Iranian football executive

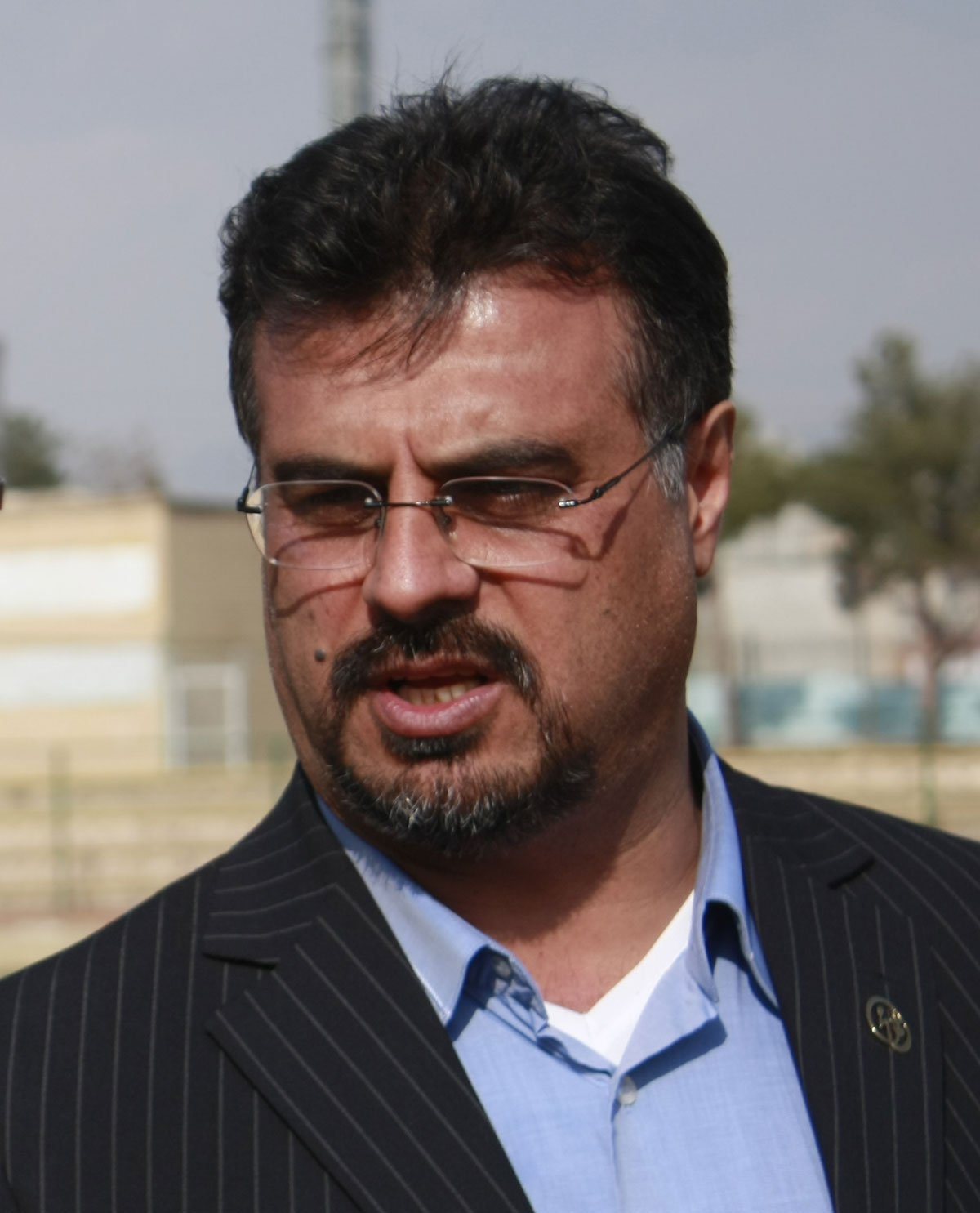
- Born: August 11, 1964 (age 61); Juybar, Iran
- Occupation: Football Administrator
- Title: Deputy Chairman of Esteghlal FC

Ali Nazari Juybari (born in Juybar, Mazandaran province, Iran) is the general manager of Esteghlal Tehran football club, and the current former technical director of the club. He was director of the club when Amir Ghalenoi was head coach. He left Esteghlal after Ghalenoi resigns as his position. He was appointed deputy chairman of the club in June 2008 by Ali Fathollahzadeh. He was also acting president of the Esteghlal from May to June 2010.
