= Osman Nurmagomedov =

Azerbaijani freestyle wrestler

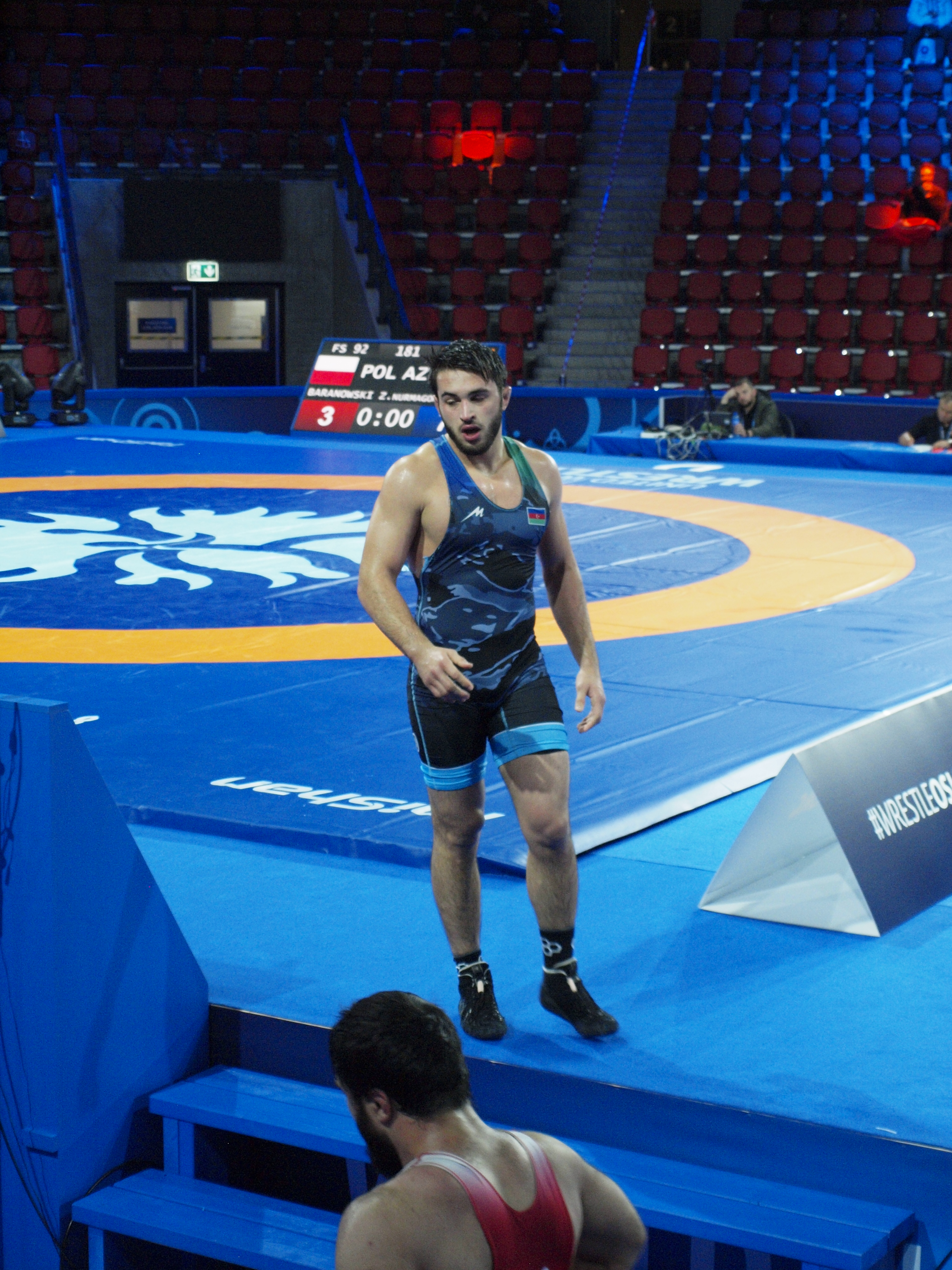
- Osman Nurmagomedov at the 2021 World Wrestling Championships in Oslo, Norway

Personal information
- Native name: Osman Əbdülvahaboviç Nurməhəmmədov
- Full name: Osman Abdulvagabovich Nurmagomedov
- Nationality: Azerbaijan; Russia
- Born: 21 May 1998 (age 28) Makhachkala, Dagestan, Russia
- Height: 180 cm (5 ft 11 in)

Sport
- Country: Azerbaijan
- Sport: Amateur wrestling
- Weight class: 92 kg
- Event: Freestyle

Achievements and titles
- World finals: (bronze) (2021) (bronze) (2022)
- Regional finals: (silver) (2025)
Medal record
Men's freestyle wrestling
Representing Azerbaijan
World Championships
Silver medal – second place	2023 Belgrade	92 kg
Bronze medal – third place	2021 Oslo	92 kg
Bronze medal – third place	2022 Belgrade	92 kg
Bronze medal – third place	2025 Zagreb	92 kg
European Championships
Silver medal – second place	2025 Bratislava	92 kg
Bronze medal – third place	2021 Warsaw	92 kg
Bronze medal – third place	2022 Budapest	92 kg
Islamic Solidarity Games
Bronze medal – third place	2021 Konya	92 kg
Yasar Dogu Tournament
Bronze medal – third place	2020 Istanbul	86 kg
Dan Kolov & Nikola Petrov Tournament
Bronze medal – third place	2022 Veliko Tarnovo	92 kg
Grand Prix
Gold medal – first place	2022 Madrid	92 kg
Gold medal – first place	2023 Warsaw	92 kg
Silver medal – second place	2021 Nice	92 kg
Silver medal – second place	2025 Zagreb	92 kg
Bronze medal – third place	2023 Zagreb	92 kg
World U23 Championships
Gold medal – first place	2021 Belgrade	92 kg
European U23 Championships
Silver medal – second place	2021 Skopje	92 kg
Representing All-World Team
World Cup
Bronze medal – third place	2022 Coralville	Team

Osman Abdulvagabovich Nurmagomedov (Azerbaijani: Osman Abdulvahaboviç Nurməhəmmədov, born 21 May 1998) is a Russian-born Azerbaijani freestyle wrestler who currently competes at 92 kilograms. Nurmagomedov has medaled at the 2021 European Championships as well as the U23 edition also in 2021.

He competed at the 2024 European Wrestling Olympic Qualification Tournament in Baku, Azerbaijan and he earned a quota place for Azerbaijan for the 2024 Summer Olympics in Paris, France. He competed in the men's freestyle 86 kg event at the Olympics.

As of April 1, 2026, with a score of 320 points, holds ninth place in the ranking of Azerbaijani athletes according to the Ministry of Youth and Sports.

== Achievements ==
Year	Competition	Venue	Position	Event	Notes
Representing Azerbaijan
2021	European Championships	Warsaw, Poland	3rd	Freestyle 92 kg	
2021	U23 European Championships	Skopje, North Macedonia	2nd	Freestyle 92 kg	
2021	World Championships	Oslo, Norway	3rd	Freestyle 92 kg	
2021	World U23 Championships	Belgrade, Serbia	1st	Freestyle 92 kg	
2022	European Championships	Budapest, Hungary	3rd	Freestyle 92 kg	
2022	World Championships	Belgrade, Serbia	3rd	Freestyle 92 kg	
