= Juybar =

City in Mazandaran province, Iran

Juybar Persian: جويبار
- City
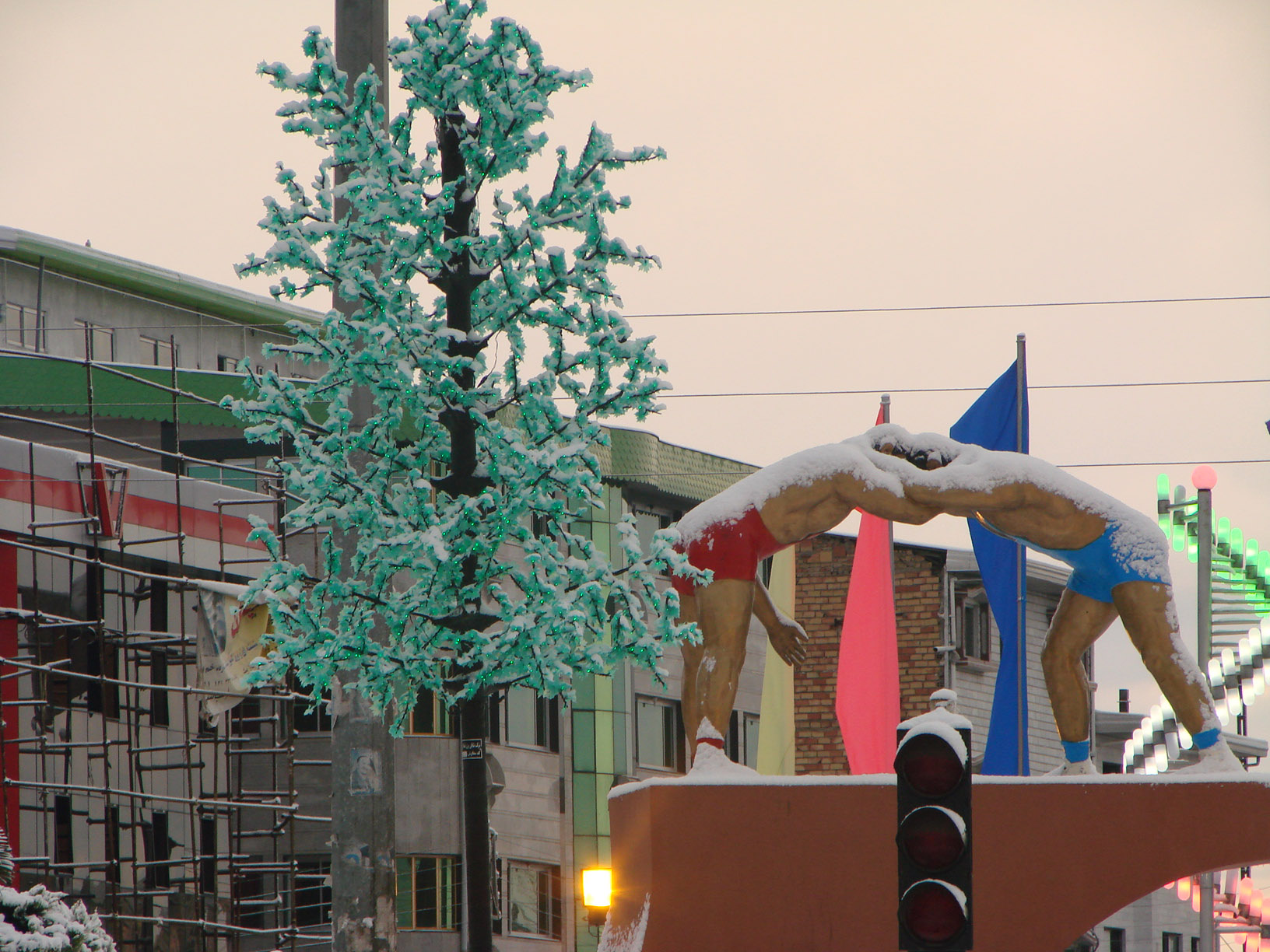
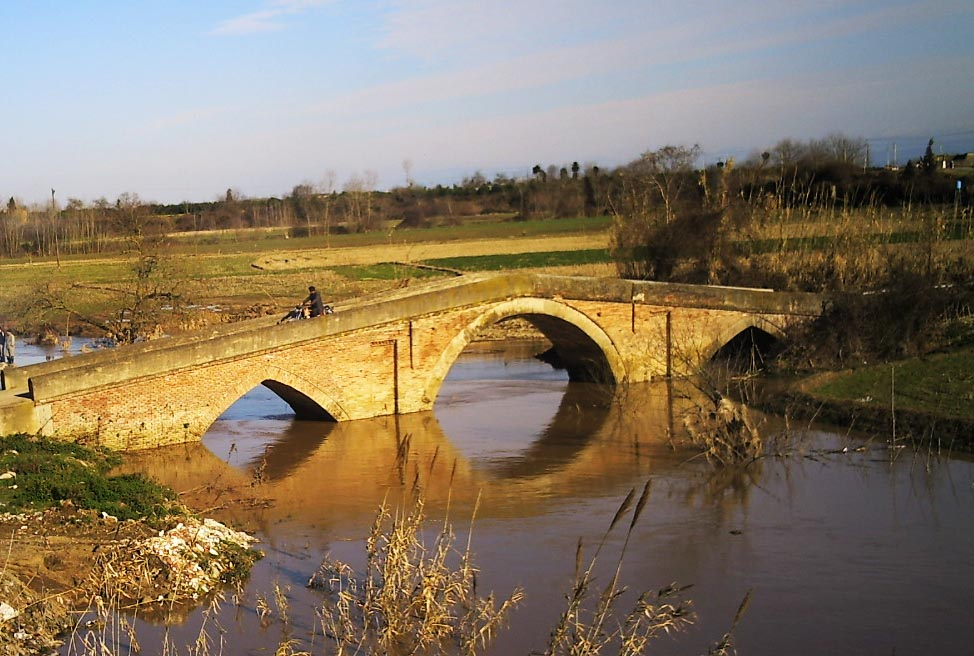
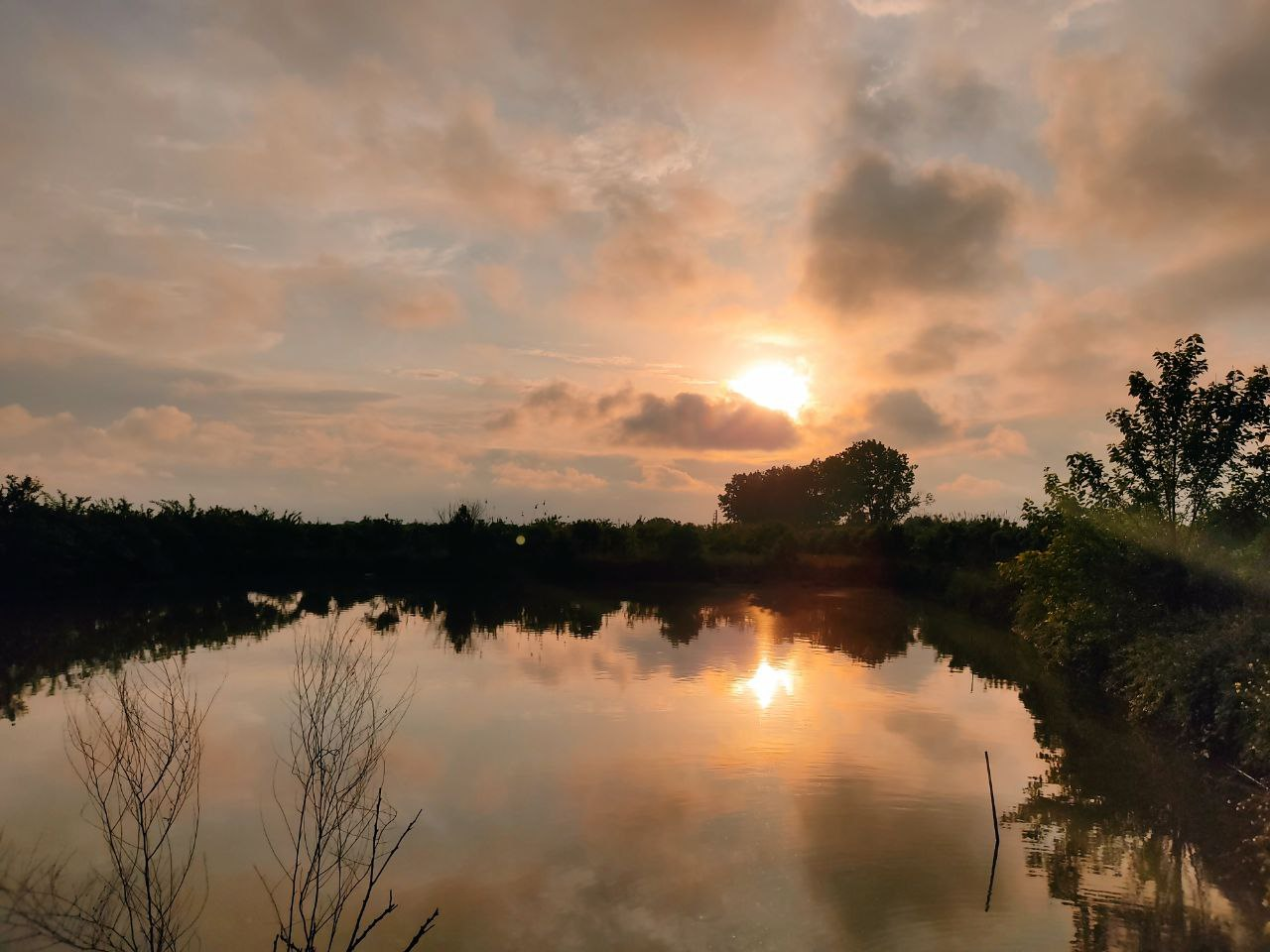
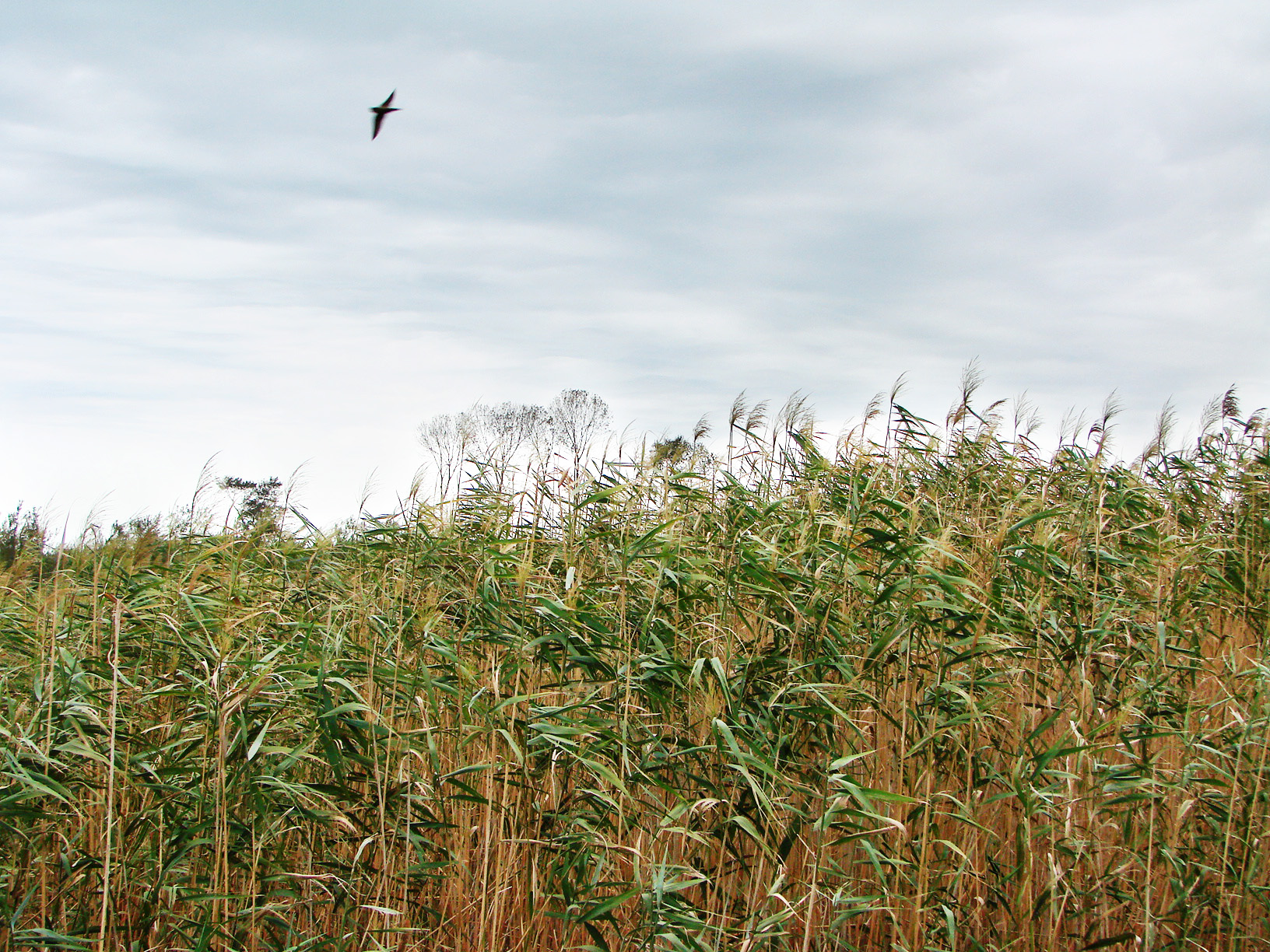
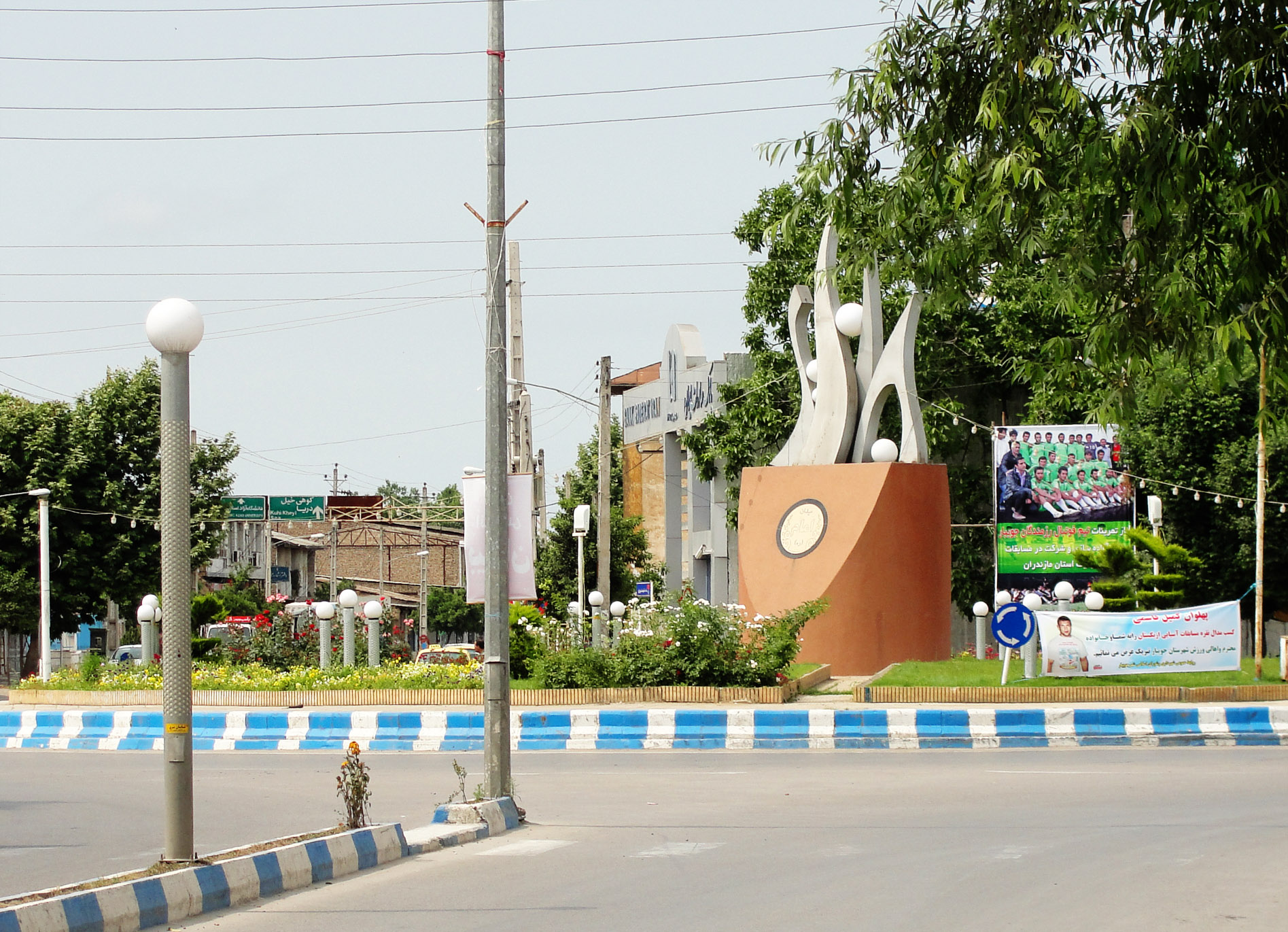
- Wrestling Square

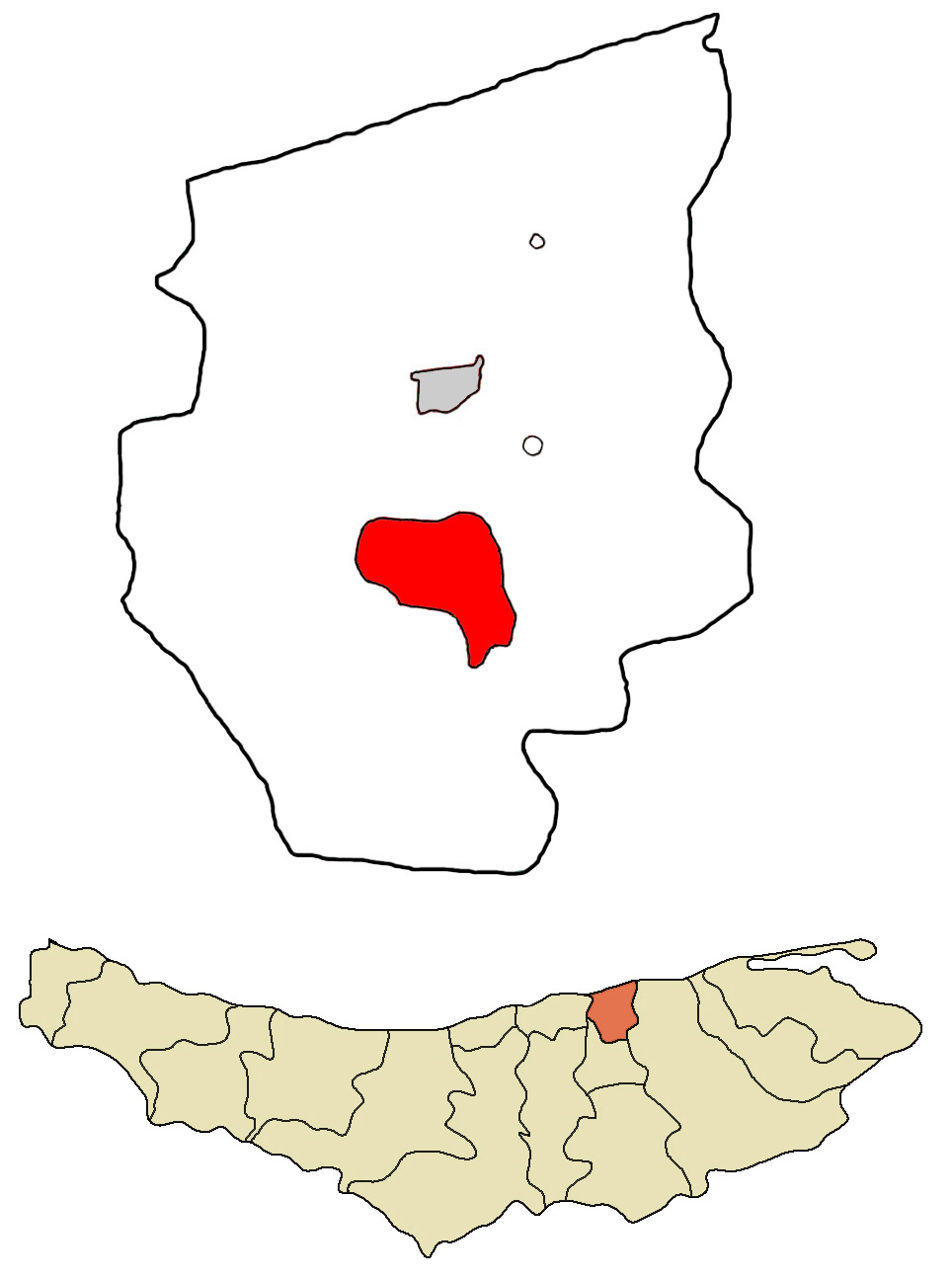
- Location in Juybar County and Mazandaran Province

- Location within Iran
- Coordinates: 36°38′15″N 52°54′02″E
- Country: Iran
- Province: Mazandaran
- County: Juybar
- District: Central
- Founded: Antiquity
- Refoundation: By Farrukhan, Daboyans Dynasty of Tapuria

Government
  - Mayor: Ramezan Seyfi Juybari
- Highest elevation: 50 m (160 ft)
- Lowest elevation: 5 m (16 ft)

Population (2016)
  - Total: 32,924
- Time zone: UTC+3:30 (IRST)
- Area code: 011

Juybar (Persian: جويبار) (Note: Also romanized as Jūybār; also known as Bāghlū) is a city in the Central District of Juybar County, Mazandaran province, Iran, serving as capital of both the county and the district. Juybar is known as the wrestling capital of Iran.

== Demographics ==
=== Population ===
At the time of the 2006 National Census, the city's population was 22,117 in 7,052 households. The following census in 2011 counted 29,122 people in 8,443 households. The 2016 census measured the population of the city as 32,924 people in 10,480 households.

== Climate ==
Juybar has a hot-summer Mediterranean climate (Csa) according to the Köppen climate classification.

Climate data for Juybar
Month	Jan	Feb	Mar	Apr	May	Jun	Jul	Aug	Sep	Oct	Nov	Dec	Year
Mean daily maximum °C (°F)	12.1 (53.8)	12.5 (54.5)	15 (59)	20.3 (68.5)	25.5 (77.9)	29.9 (85.8)	32.3 (90.1)	31.9 (89.4)	29.3 (84.7)	24.3 (75.7)	19.3 (66.7)	14.5 (58.1)	22.2 (72.0)
Mean daily minimum °C (°F)	3.4 (38.1)	4.2 (39.6)	7.1 (44.8)	11.7 (53.1)	16.7 (62.1)	21.1 (70.0)	23.6 (74.5)	23.2 (73.8)	20.1 (68.2)	14.5 (58.1)	10.4 (50.7)	5.3 (41.5)	13.4 (56.2)
Average rainfall mm (inches)	82.9 (3.26)	72.2 (2.84)	67.2 (2.65)	41.6 (1.64)	23.6 (0.93)	15.9 (0.63)	20.0 (0.79)	17.2 (0.68)	54.1 (2.13)	91.5 (3.60)	90.9 (3.58)	57.6 (2.27)	634.7 (25)
Average snowfall cm (inches)	0.8 (0.3)	3.0 (1.2)	0.9 (0.4)	0.0 (0.0)	0.0 (0.0)	0.0 (0.0)	0.0 (0.0)	0.0 (0.0)	0.0 (0.0)	0.0 (0.0)	2.2 (0.9)	0.0 (0.0)	6.9 (2.8)
Average relative humidity (%)	83	80	79	76	73	69	71	73	74	76	80	83	76
Mean daily sunshine hours	4.8	5.1	4.9	6.3	7.9	9.4	9	8.1	7.4	6.4	5.6	4.8	6.6
Average ultraviolet index	3	3	3	5	6	7	7	7	6	5	4	3	5
Source: Weather2visit, World weather online (rainfall-snowfall-UV 2009-2023)

== Tourist attractions ==
- Jom'e Bazaar Bridge
- Sikan Bridge
- Juybar Bazaar
- Chapakrud
- Bizaki Saqanefar
- Adham Ancient Site
- Azaan Bridge
- Kord Kola Lagoon

== Notable people ==
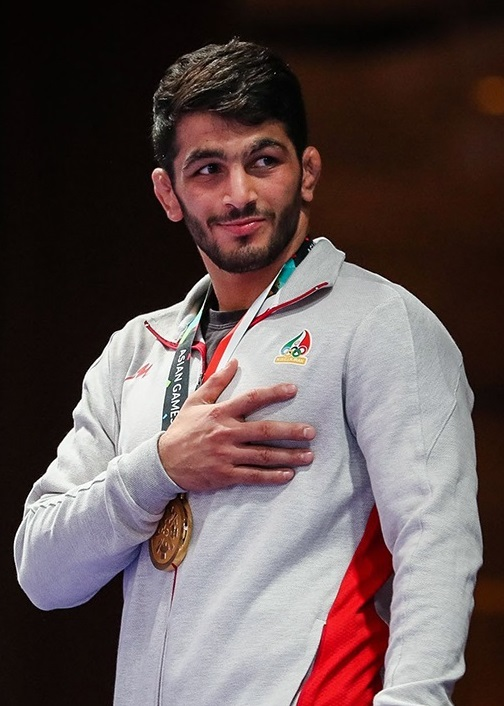
Hassan Yazdani

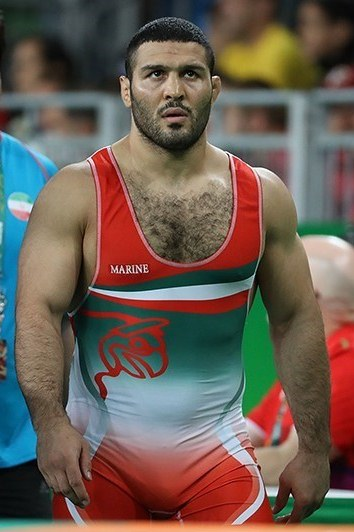
Reza Yazdani

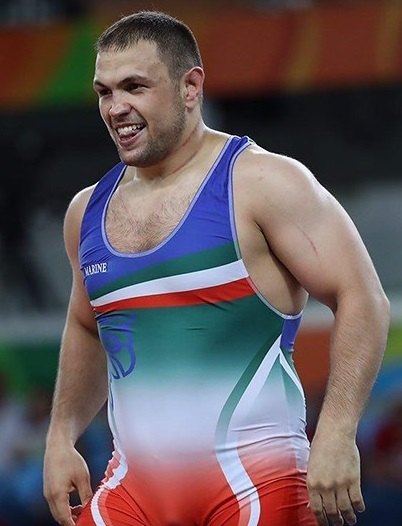
Komeil Ghasemi

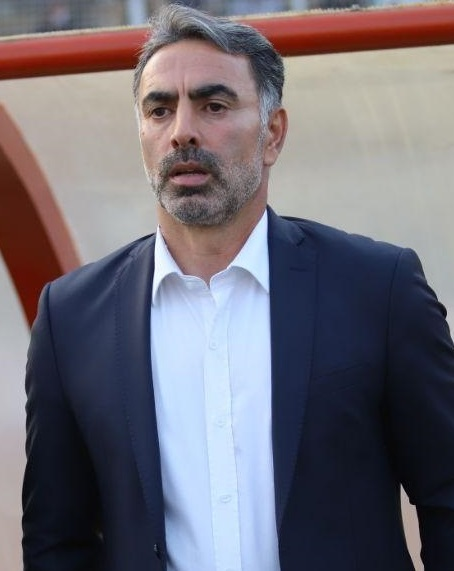
Mahmoud Fekri

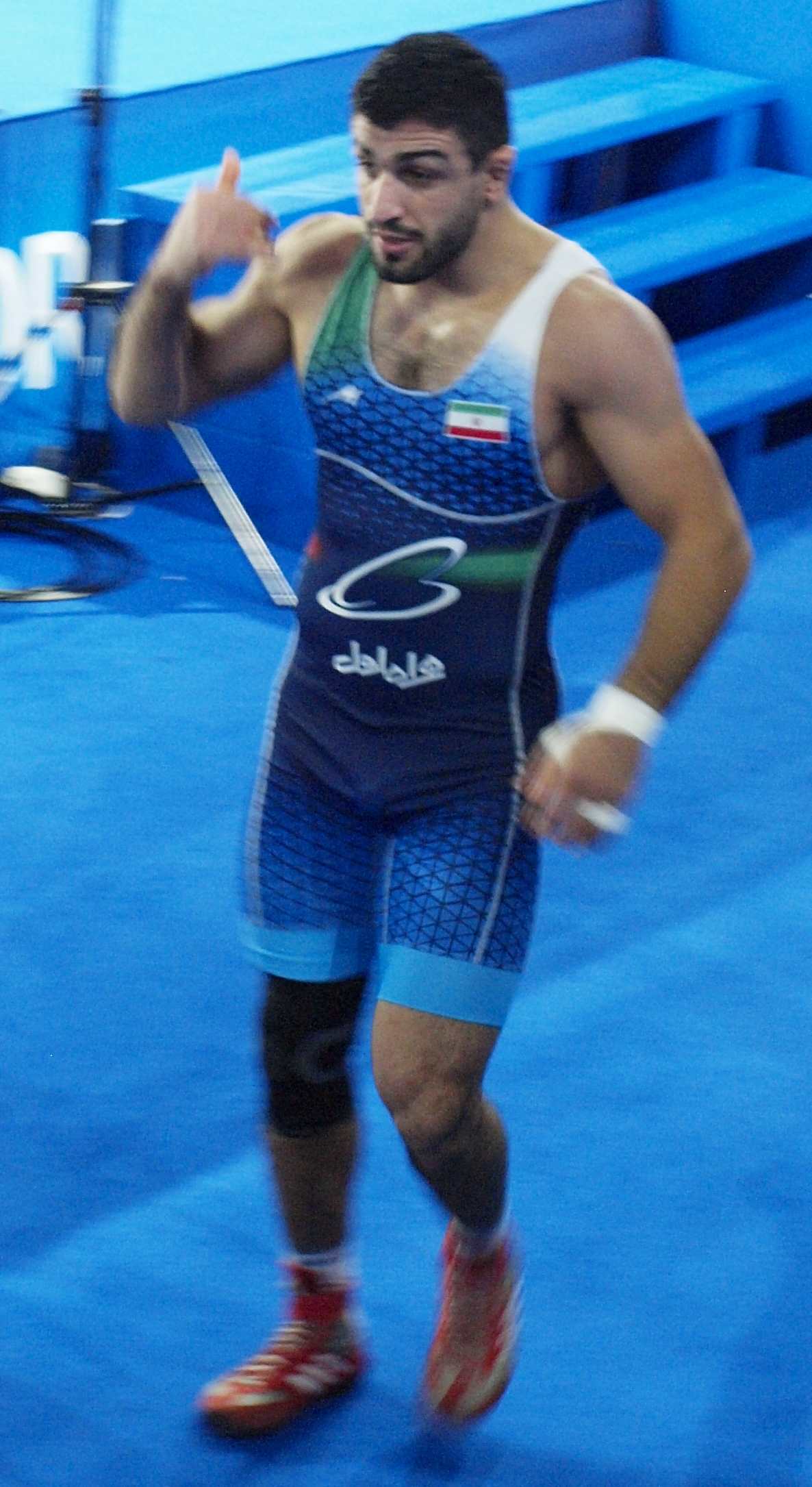
Kamran Ghasempour

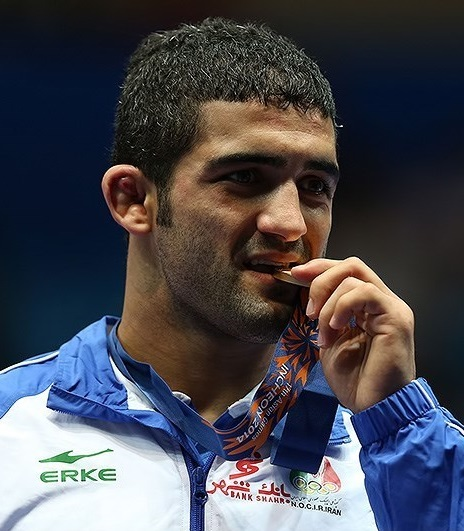
Masoud Esmaeilpour

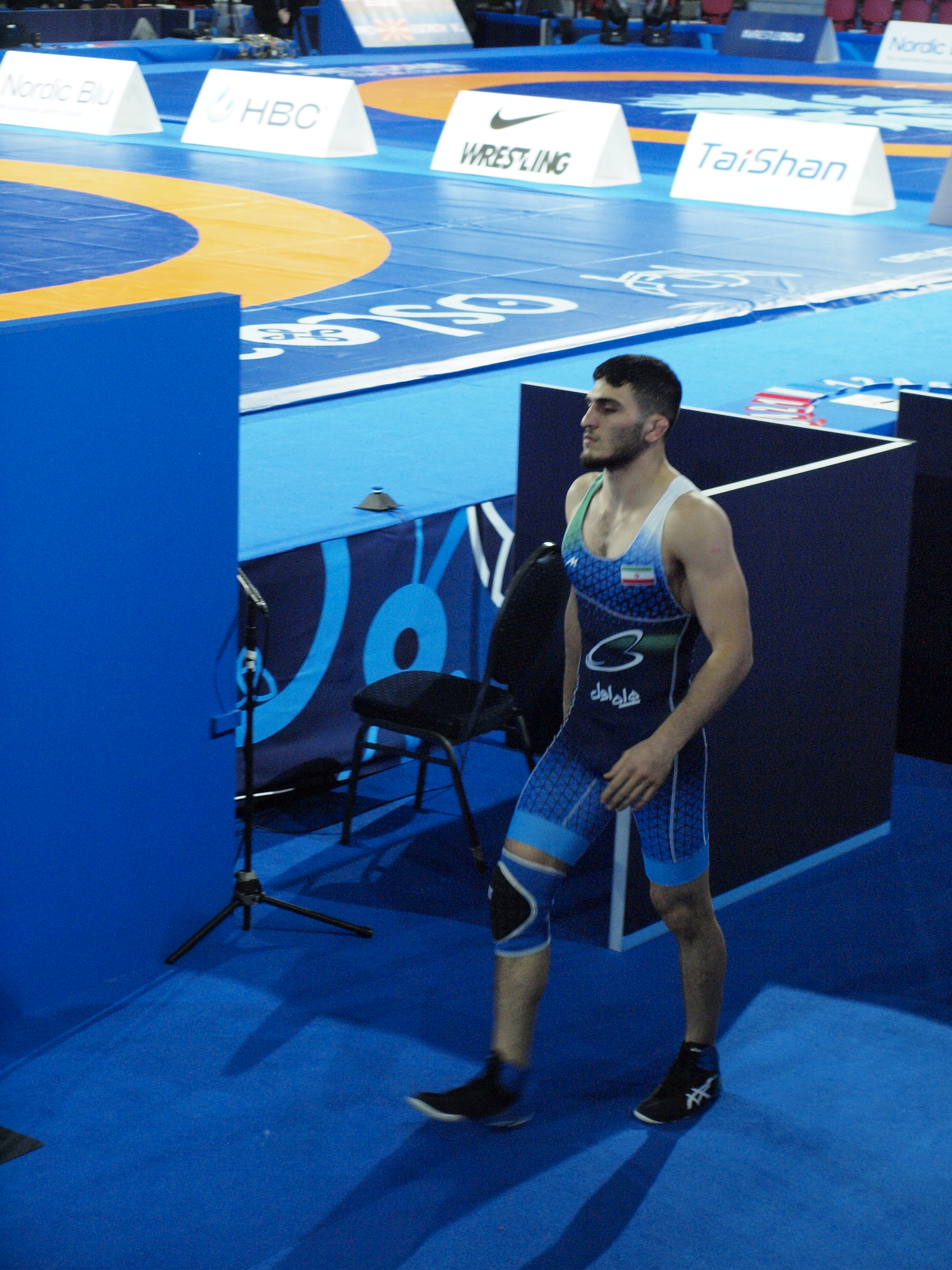
Mohammad Nokhodi

- Hassan Yazdani
- Reza Yazdani
- Masoud Esmaeilpour
- Komeil Ghasemi
- Sobhan Rouhi
- Ezzatollah Akbari
- Mehdi Hajizadeh
- Ayat Vagozari
- Kamran Ghasempour
- Bijan Mortazavi
- Amir Hossein Firouzpour
- Yasubedin Rastegar Jooybari
- Mohammad Nokhodi
- Amir Mohammad Yazdani
- Shahab Gordan
- Mahmoud Fekri
- Soroush Ahmadi
- Ali Nazari Juybari
- Mohammad Javad Hosseinnejad
- Mohammad Sadegh Firouzpour

== See also ==
Media related to Juybar at Wikimedia Commons
