= Wrestling at the 2016 Summer Olympics – Men's freestyle 86 kg =

Men's freestyle 86 kg at the Games of the XXXI Olympiad
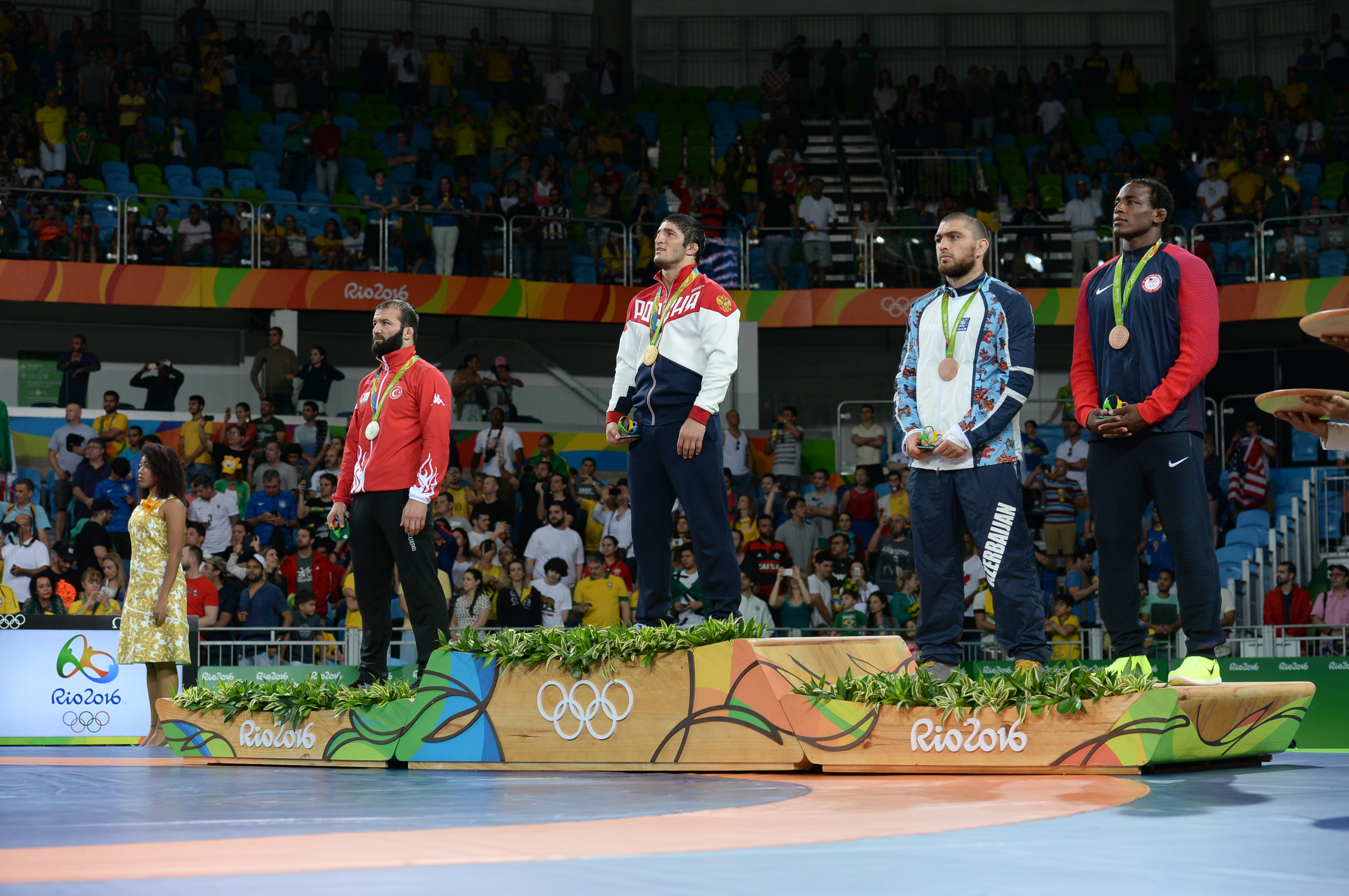
- Medalists
- Venue: Carioca Arena 2
- Date: 20 August 2016
- Competitors: 19 from 19 nations

Medalists
| 1st place, gold medalist(s) | | Abdulrashid Sadulaev | Russia |
| 2nd place, silver medalist(s) | | Selim Yaşar | Turkey |
| 3rd place, bronze medalist(s) | | Sharif Sharifov | Azerbaijan |
| 3rd place, bronze medalist(s) | | J'den Cox | United States |

Men's freestyle 86 kilograms competition at the 2016 Summer Olympics in Rio de Janeiro, Brazil, took place on August 20 at the Carioca Arena 2 in Barra da Tijuca.

This freestyle wrestling competition consists of a single-elimination tournament, with a repechage used to determine the winner of two bronze medals. The two finalists face off for gold and silver medals. Each wrestler who loses to one of the two finalists moves into the repechage, culminating in a pair of bronze medal matches featuring the semifinal losers each facing the remaining repechage opponent from their half of the bracket.

Each bout consists of a single round within a six-minute limit. The wrestler who scores more points is the winner.

== Schedule ==
All times are Brasília Standard Time (UTC−03:00)

| Date | Time | Event |
|---|---|---|
| 20 August 2016 | 10:00 | Qualification rounds |
| 20 August 2016 | 16:00 | Repechage |
| 20 August 2016 | 17:00 | Finals |

== Results ==
Legend

- D — Disqualified
- F — Won by fall

=== Final ===
| Final |
| Abdulrashid Sadulaev (RUS) | 5 |
| Selim Yaşar (TUR) | 0 |

=== Top half ===
Qualifications

1/8 finals
Abdulrashid Sadulaev (RUS) | 10
István Veréb (HUN) | 0
Pedro Ceballos (VEN) | 6
Mohamed Zaghloul (EGY) | 0
Bi Shengfeng (CHN) | 0
Sharif Sharifov (AZE) | 10
Zbigniew Baranowski (POL) | 2
Sandro Aminashvili (GEO) | 2

1/4 finals
Abdulrashid Sadulaev (RUS) | 5
Pedro Ceballos (VEN) | 0
Sharif Sharifov (AZE) | 7
Zbigniew Baranowski (POL) | 0

Semifinals
Abdulrashid Sadulaev (RUS) | 8
Sharif Sharifov (AZE) | 1

=== Bottom half ===
Qualifications
Aslan Kakhidze (KAZ) | 7
Amarhajy Mahamedau (BLR) | 11
Orgodolyn Üitümen (MGL) | 6
Mihail Ganev (BUL) | 4^{F}
Alireza Karimi (IRI) | 9
Mohamed Saadaoui (TUN) | 0

1/8 finals
Selim Yaşar (TUR) | 5
Jaime Espinal (PUR) | 2
Reineris Salas (CUB) | 4^{F}
Kim Gwan-uk (KOR) | 1
J'den Cox (USA) | 7
Amarhajy Mahamedau (BLR) | 1
Mihail Ganev (BUL) | 2
Alireza Karimi (IRI) | 7

1/4 finals
Selim Yaşar (TUR) | 5
Reineris Salas (CUB) | 2
J'den Cox (USA) | 5
Alireza Karimi (IRI) | 1

Semifinals
Selim Yaşar (TUR) | 2
J'den Cox (USA) | 1

=== Repechage ===
Repechage round 2
István Veréb (HUN) | 6
Pedro Ceballos (VEN) | 7
Jaime Espinal (PUR) | 4
Reineris Salas (CUB) | 6

Bronze medals
Pedro Ceballos (VEN) | 1
Sharif Sharifov (AZE) | 5
Reineris Salas (CUB) | 1^{D}
J'den Cox (USA) | 3

== Final standing ==
| Rank | Athlete |
|---|---|
| 1st place, gold medalist(s) | Abdulrashid Sadulaev (RUS) |
| 2nd place, silver medalist(s) | Selim Yaşar (TUR) |
| 3rd place, bronze medalist(s) | Sharif Sharifov (AZE) |
| 3rd place, bronze medalist(s) | J'den Cox (USA) |
| 5 | Pedro Ceballos (VEN) |
| 5 | Reineris Salas (CUB) |
| 7 | Alireza Karimi (IRI) |
| 8 | Mihail Ganev (BUL) |
| 9 | Amarhajy Mahamedau (BLR) |
| 10 | Zbigniew Baranowski (POL) |
| 11 | Jaime Espinal (PUR) |
| 12 | Aslan Kakhidze (KAZ) |
| 13 | István Veréb (HUN) |
| 14 | Sandro Aminashvili (GEO) |
| 15 | Orgodolyn Üitümen (MGL) |
| 16 | Kim Gwan-uk (KOR) |
| 17 | Mohamed Zaghloul (EGY) |
| 18 | Mohamed Saadaoui (TUN) |
| 19 | Bi Shengfeng (CHN) |
