= Atsushi Matsumoto =

Japanese freestyle wrestler

Personal information
- Born: 24 March 1988 (age 38)
- Height: 181 cm (5 ft 11 in)

Sport
- Country: Japan
- Sport: Amateur wrestling
- Events: Freestyle; Greco-Roman
Medal record
Men's freestyle wrestling
Representing Japan
World Championships
Bronze medal – third place	2018 Budapest	92 kg
Asian Championships
Silver medal – second place	2015 Doha	86 kg
Bronze medal – third place	2019 Xi'an	92 kg
Men's Greco-Roman wrestling
Representing Japan
Silver medal – second place	2017 New Delhi	85 kg

Atsushi Matsumoto (born 24 March 1988) is a Japanese freestyle wrestler. In 2018, he won one of the bronze medals in the 92 kg event at the 2018 World Wrestling Championships held in Budapest, Hungary. He also competed in Greco-Roman wrestling in 2017, winning the silver medal in the 85 kg event at the 2017 Asian Wrestling Championships held in New Delhi, India.

== Career ==
In 2010, he competed in the men's freestyle 84 kg event at the Asian Games in Guangzhou, China without winning a medal. He was eliminated from the competition in his first match by Muhammad Inam of Pakistan.

He won one of the bronze medals in the men's 92 kg event at the 2019 Asian Wrestling Championships held in Xi'an, China.

== Major results ==
Year	Tournament	Location	Result	Event
2015	Asian Championships	Doha, Qatar	2nd	Freestyle 86 kg
2017	Asian Championships	New Delhi, India	2nd	Greco-Roman 85 kg
2018	World Championships	Budapest, Hungary	3rd	Freestyle 92 kg
2019	Asian Championships	Xi'an, China	3rd	Freestyle 92 kg
