= 2021 U23 World Wrestling Championships – Men's freestyle 92 kg =

Wrestling Championship

The men's freestyle 92 kilograms is a competition featured at the 2021 U23 World Wrestling Championships, and was held in Belgrade, Serbia on 6 and 7 November.

== Medalists ==
| Gold | Osman Nurmagomedov (AZE) |
| Silver | Azamat Zakuev (RUS) |
| Bronze | Amir Hossein Firouzpour (IRI) |
| Bronze | Erhan Yaylacı (TUR) |

== Results ==
Legend

- F — Won by fall

=== Final ===
| Final |
| Osman Nurmagomedov (AZE) | 4 |
| Azamat Zakuev (RUS) | 2 |

=== Top half ===
Round of 32

Round of 16
Luka Khutchua (GEO) | 1
Johannes Mayer (GER) | 4
Andrian Grosul (MDA) | 0
Osman Nurmagomedov (AZE) | 8
Bekzat Urkimbay (KAZ) | 10
Viliam Oross (SVK) | 0
Amir Hossein Firouzpour (IRI) | 11
Kolyo Dimitrov (BUL) | 0

Quarterfinals
Johannes Mayer (GER) | 0
Osman Nurmagomedov (AZE) | 7
Bekzat Urkimbay (KAZ) | 0
Amir Hossein Firouzpour (IRI) | 11

Semifinals
Osman Nurmagomedov (AZE) | 10
Amir Hossein Firouzpour (IRI) | 7

=== Bottom half ===
Round of 32
Dagvadorjiin Orgilokh (MGL) | 0
Erhan Yaylacı (TUR) | 11
Guradeshwar Singh (IND) | 0
Arkadzi Pahasian (BLR) | 10
Julien Choquette (CAN) | 0
Denys Sahaliuk (UKR) | 6

Round of 16
Stole Eftimov (MKD) | 0
Azamat Zakuev (RUS) | 10
Rustam Shodiev (UZB) | 10
Davide Cossu (ITA) | 0
Nino Bonaccorsi (USA) | 6
Erhan Yaylacı (TUR) | 12
Arkadzi Pahasian (BLR) | 6^{F}
Denys Sahaliuk (UKR) | 0

Quarterfinals
Azamat Zakuev (RUS) | 10
Rustam Shodiev (UZB) | 0
Erhan Yaylacı (TUR) | 12
Arkadzi Pahasian (BLR) | 4

Semifinals
Azamat Zakuev (RUS) | 9
Erhan Yaylacı (TUR) | 1

=== Repechage ===
Repechage round 1
Andrian Grosul (MDA) | 2
Johannes Mayer (GER) | 5
Stole Eftimov (MKD) | 0
Rustam Shodiev (UZB) | 10

Bronze medals
Johannes Mayer (GER) | 0
Amir Hossein Firouzpour (IRI) | 10
Rustam Shodiev (UZB) | 2
Erhan Yaylacı (TUR) | 13^{F}
