= Amarhajy Mahamedau =

Belarusian freestyle wrestler

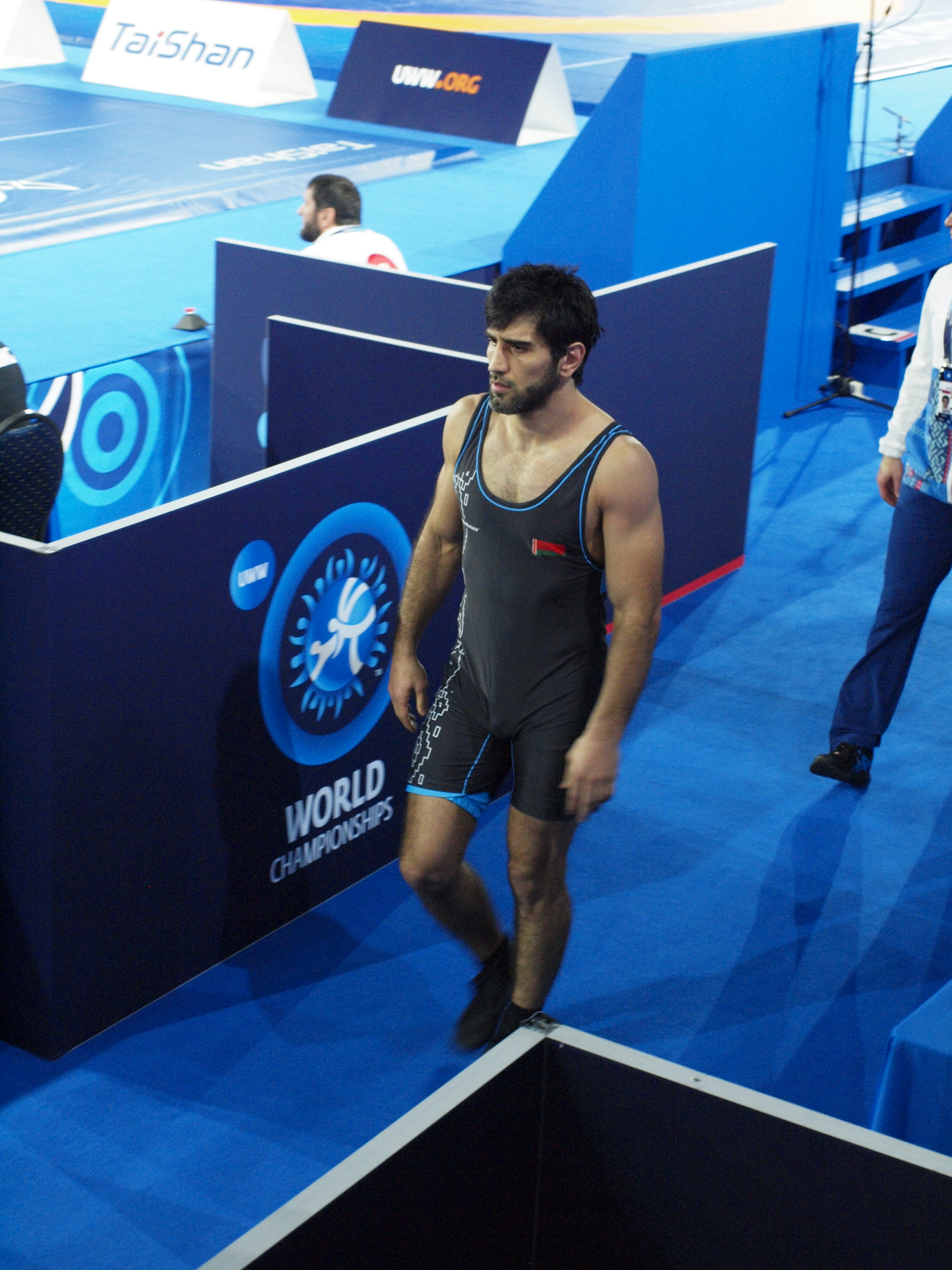

Personal information
- Full name: Amarhajy Abdulgadzhievich Mahamedau
- Nationality: Russia; Belarus
- Born: 12 April 1990 (age 36) Makhachkala, Dagestan ASSR, RSFSR, USSR
- Years active: 2000 – present
- Height: 184 cm (6 ft 0 in)
- Weight: 84–92 kg (185–203 lb)

Sport
- Club: SHVSM (Minsk)
- Coached by: Valentin Murzinkov
Medal record
European Wrestling Championships
Bronze medal – third place	Rome 2020	up to 92 kg

Amarhajy Mahamedau (born April 12, 1990, in Dagestan) is a Belarusan and Russian freestyle wrestler. He competed in the men's freestyle 86 kg event at the 2016 Summer Olympics, in which he was eliminated in the round of 16 by J'den Cox.

== Sports career ==
Amarhajy graduated from the Dagestan wrestling school. Since 2008, he has been competing in major international tournaments for Belarus. After the 2014 World Championships in Tashkent, where he finished 32nd, he was excluded from the national team. However, in October 2015, Alexander Lasitsa was appointed head coach of the national team, who returned him to the team. In April 2016, when at the European Qualifying Tournament for the Olympics he won a license for the Rio de Janeiro. At the 2016 Olympic Games, in the octofinals, he won with a score of 11:7 against Aslan Kakhidze, and in the quarterfinals finals, he lost to J'den Cox with a score of 1:7.

In February 2020, at the continental championship, in the weight category up to 92 kg, Omargadzhi defeated the athlete from Armenia, Marzpet Galstyan, in the fight for the bronze medal and won the bronze medal of the European championship.
