= Alireza Karimi =

Iranian freestyle wrestler

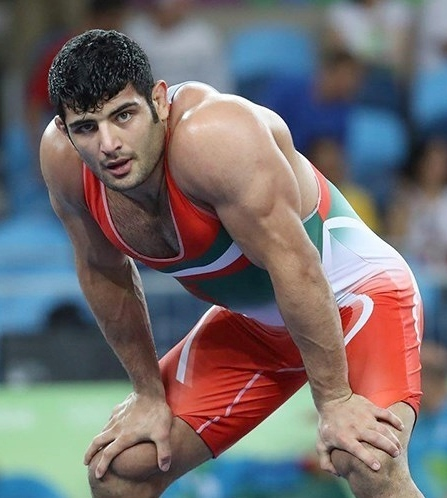
- Karimi at the 2016 Summer Olympics

Personal information
- Native name: علیرضا کریمی ماچیانی
- Full name: Alireza Karimi Machiani
- Nationality: Iran
- Born: 21 March 1994 (age 32) Karaj, Iran
- Height: 1.75 m (5 ft 9 in)
- Weight: 198 lb (90 kg)

Sport
- Country: Iran
- Sport: Freestyle wrestling
- Coached by: Mohammad Kermani
Medal record
Representing Iran
World Championships
Silver medal – second place	2019 Nur-Sultan	92 kg
Bronze medal – third place	2015 Las Vegas	86 kg
Bronze medal – third place	2018 Budapest	92 kg
Asian Games
Gold medal – first place	2018 Jakarta	97 kg
Asian Championships
Gold medal – first place	2015 Doha	86 kg
Gold medal – first place	2017 New Delhi	86 kg
Gold medal – first place	2019 Xi'an	92 kg
Silver medal – second place	2023 Astana	86 kg
Islamic Solidarity Games
Gold medal – first place	2021 Konya	86 kg

Alireza Karimi Machiani (Persian: علیرضا کریمی ماچیانی; born 21 March 1994) is an Iranian freestyle wrestler. He won a bronze medal at the 2015 World Championships in the 86 kg division. He was eliminated by J'den Cox of the United States in the third bout at the 2016 Olympics. He is the 2018 Asian Games Champion in the 97 kg division and also won gold medals in the Asian Championships in 2015, 2017 and 2019.

In February 2018 the United World Wrestling banned Karimi for six months for deliberately throwing a match to avoid having to face an Israeli opponent, Uri Kalashnikov who went on to win the bronze medal. He thereby violated International Wrestling Rules and the UWW Disciplinary Regulations, by intentionally losing to a Russian competitor in the quarterfinal of the U-23 World Championship in Bydgoszcz, Poland, in the 86-kilogram category, in November 2017. Karimi was then supposed to face the Israeli, Kalashnikov, in the repechage (to compete for the bronze medal), but he forfeited that match. Karimi's coach, Hamidreza Jamshidi, was also banned, in his case for two years, for instructing Karimi to lose, shouting from the sidelines: "Ali Reza, lose." Karimi told the Iranian Students News Agency that he purposefully lost to avoid the risk of competing against the Israeli. Iran's wrestling federation had praised Karimi for throwing the match.

Israeli Prime Minister Benjamin Netanyahu criticized the Iranian regime for its actions, and accused it of interfering in sports and pressuring its athletes to not compete against the Israelis, saying "hating others will never make you a champion. It only makes you a pathetic and insecure loser." Iran Wrestling Federation president Rasoul Khadem said: "The federation will protest the verdict ... During his six-month ban, Karimi Mashiani can take part in domestic competitions and in the final stage of the national team selection. His ban will be over before the 2018 Jakarta Asian Games and the World Championship."

== See also ==
- Boycotts of Israel in individual sports
