= Ivan Yankouski =

Belarusian freestyle wrestler

Sport
- Country: Belarus
- Sport: Amateur wrestling
- Event: Freestyle
Medal record
Men's freestyle wrestling
Representing Belarus
World Championships
Silver medal – second place	2018 Budapest	92 kg
European Championships
Silver medal – second place	2016 Riga	97 kg
Bronze medal – third place	2012 Belgrade	96 kg
Bronze medal – third place	2014 Vantaa	97 kg
Military World Games
Bronze medal – third place	2015 Mungyeong	97 kg

Ivan Yankouski is a Belarusian freestyle wrestler. He is a silver medalist at the World Wrestling Championships and a three-time medalist at the European Wrestling Championships.

== Career ==
In 2016, Yankouski won the silver medal in the men's 97 kg event at the 2016 European Wrestling Championships held in Riga, Latvia.

In 2018, he won the silver medal in the men's 92 kg event at the 2018 World Wrestling Championships held in Budapest, Hungary.

== Achievements ==
Year	Tournament	Location	Result	Event
2012	European Championships	Riga, Latvia	3rd	Freestyle 96 kg
2014	European Championships	Vantaa, Finland	3rd	Freestyle 97 kg
2015	Military World Games	Mungyeong, South Korea	3rd	Freestyle 97 kg
2016	European Championships	Riga, Latvia	2nd	Freestyle 97 kg
2018	World Championships	Budapest, Hungary	2nd	Freestyle 92 kg
