= 2026 World Wrestling Championships – Men's freestyle 92 kg =

Men's freestyle 92 kg at the 2026 World Championships
- Venue: Barys Arena
- Dates: 31 October – 1 November 2026
- Competitors: 23 from 23 nations

Medalists
gold medal	Amanula Gadzhimagomedov	Russia
silver medal	Trent Hidlay	United States
bronze medal	Ali Tcokaev	Azerbaijan
bronze medal	Miriani Maisuradze	Georgia

The men's freestyle 92 kilograms is a competition featured at the 2026 World Wrestling Championships, and was held in Astana, Kazakhstan on 31 October and 1 November 2026.

This freestyle wrestling competition consists of a single-elimination tournament, with a repechage used to determine the winner of two bronze medals. The two finalists face off for gold and silver medals. Each wrestler who loses to one of the two finalists moves into the repechage, culminating in a pair of bronze medal matches, featuring the semifinal losers each facing the remaining repechage opponent from their half of the bracket.

== Results ==
Legend

- F — Won by fall
- WO — Won by walkover

=== Final ===
Final
Trent Hidlay (USA)	2
Amanula Gadzhimagomedov (RUS)	3

=== Top half ===
Round of 32
Domantas Pauliuščenko (LTU)	4
Redjep Hajdari (MKD)	7
Mukhammed Aliiev (UKR)	14
Koen Poirier (CAN)	4
Fatih Altunbaş (TUR)	4
Iakov Chaplin (KGZ)	6

Round of 16
Trent Hidlay (USA)	8^{F}
Jesaia Uera (NRU)	0
Redjep Hajdari (MKD)	0
Ali Tcokaev (AZE)	10
Akhmed Bataev (BUL)	7
Mukhammed Aliiev (UKR)	5
Iakov Chaplin (KGZ)	1
Amir Hossein Firouzpour (IRI)	12

Quarterfinals
Trent Hidlay (USA)	5
Ali Tcokaev (AZE)	1
Akhmed Bataev (BUL)	4
Amir Hossein Firouzpour (IRI)	7

Semifinals
Trent Hidlay (USA)	11
Amir Hossein Firouzpour (IRI)	8

=== Bottom half ===
Round of 32
Ion Demian (MDA)	10
Tserenpuntsagiin Ganbat (MGL)	0
Sugela (CHN)	10
Cha Seo-hyun (KOR)	0
Sachin (IND)	0
Dauren Kurugliev (GRE)	10
Magomed Sharipov (BRN)	13
Sorato Kanazawa (JPN)	5

Round of 16
Amanula Gadzhimagomedov (RUS)	11
Ion Demian (MDA)	1
Sugela (CHN)	2
Samuel Scherrer (SUI)	5^{F}
Azamat Dauletbekov (KAZ)	2
Dauren Kurugliev (GRE)	2
Magomed Sharipov (BRN)	1
Miriani Maisuradze (GEO)	4

Quarterfinals
Amanula Gadzhimagomedov (RUS)	11
Samuel Scherrer (SUI)	4
Azamat Dauletbekov (KAZ)	3
Miriani Maisuradze (GEO)	4

Semifinals
Amanula Gadzhimagomedov (RUS)	3
Miriani Maisuradze (GEO)	2

=== Repechage ===
Repechage round 2
~~Jesaia Uera (NRU)~~
Ali Tcokaev (AZE)	WO
Ion Demian (MDA)	2
Samuel Scherrer (SUI)	6

Bronze medals
Ali Tcokaev (AZE)	6
Amir Hossein Firouzpour (IRI)	0
Samuel Scherrer (SUI)	3
Miriani Maisuradze (GEO)	6

== Final standing ==
Rank	Athlete
1st place, gold medalist(s)	Amanula Gadzhimagomedov (RUS)
2nd place, silver medalist(s)	Trent Hidlay (USA)
3rd place, bronze medalist(s)	Ali Tcokaev (AZE)
3rd place, bronze medalist(s)	Miriani Maisuradze (GEO)
5	Amir Hossein Firouzpour (IRI)
5	Samuel Scherrer (SUI)
7	Ion Demian (MDA)
8	Mukhammed Aliiev (UKR)
9	Dauren Kurugliev (GRE)
10	Sugela (CHN)
11	Magomed Sharipov (BRN)
12	Akhmed Bataev (BUL)
13	Iakov Chaplin (KGZ)
14	Azamat Dauletbekov (KAZ)
15	Redjep Hajdari (MKD)
16	Sorato Kanazawa (JPN)
17	Fatih Altunbaş (TUR)
18	Domantas Pauliuščenko (LTU)
19	Koen Poirier (CAN)
20	Tserenpuntsagiin Ganbat (MGL)
21	Cha Seo-hyun (KOR)
22	Sachin (IND)
—	Jesaia Uera (NRU)
