= Feyzullah Aktürk =

Turkish freestyle wrestler

Personal information
- Born: 1 January 1999 (age 27) Manisa, Turkey
- Height: 1.80 m (5 ft 11 in)
- Weight: 92 kg (203 lb; 14.5 st)

Sport
- Country: Turkey
- Sport: Amateur wrestling
- Event: Freestyle
- Club: Ankara Aski Sport Club
Medal record
Men's freestyle wrestling
Representing Turkey
World Championships
Bronze medal – third place	2023 Belgrade	92 kg
European Championships
Gold medal – first place	2022 Budapest	92 kg
Gold medal – first place	2023 Zagreb	92 kg
Gold medal – first place	2024 Bucharest	92 kg
Bronze medal – third place	2025 Bratislava	92 kg
Mediterranean Games
Silver medal – second place	2022 Oran	97 kg
Grand Prix
Bronze medal – third place	2023 Alexandria	92 kg
Bronze medal – third place	2025 Tirana	92 kg
World U23 Championships
Bronze medal – third place	2022 Pontevedra	92 kg
European U23 Championships
Gold medal – first place	2022 Plovdiv	92 kg
World Juniors Championships
Bronze medal – third place	2017 Tampere	120 kg
Bronze medal – third place	2019 Tallinn	97 kg
European Juniors Championships
Gold medal – first place	2019 Pontevedra	97 kg
Silver medal – second place	2018 Rome	97 kg
Bronze medal – third place	2016 Bucharest	97 kg
European Cadets Championships
Gold medal – first place	2016 Stockholm	100 kg

Feyzullah Aktürk (born 1 January 1999) is a Turkish freestyle wrestler competing in the 92 kg division. He is a 3 time (2022, 2023, 2024) European champion. He is a member of Ankara ASKI.

== Wrestling career ==
In 2022, he won the gold medal in the men's 92 kg event at the 2022 European Wrestling Championships held in Budapest, Hungary. Akturk claimed a 6–1 victory over Ahmed Sultanovich Bataev from Bulgaria in the 92 kg freestyle division in Hungary's capital. The honor marked Turkiye's landmark 100th gold medal in the history of the European wrestling championships. He won the gold medal in his event at the 2022 European U23 Wrestling Championship held in Plovdiv, Bulgaria.

He won the silver medal in the 97 kg event at the 2022 Mediterranean Games held in Oran, Algeria. He competed in the 92 kg event at the 2022 World Wrestling Championships held in Belgrade, Serbia.

He became the European champion for the second time at the 2023 European Wrestling Championships in Zagreb, Croatia by defeating Osman Nurmagomedov, competing for Azerbaijan, 5-2 in the men's freestyle 92 kg final match. He defeated Moldovan Andrian Grosul 8-0 in the first round, Ukrainian Illia Archaia 6-0 in the quarterfinals and Georgian Mirian Maisuradze 11-1 with technical superiority in the semifinals. Feyzullah Aktürk won a bronze medal by defeating his Georgian rival Mirian Maisuradze 5-3 with 2 points in the last seconds in the men's freestyle 92 kg third place match at the 2023 World Wrestling Championships in Belgrade, Serbia. In the second round, Feyzullah Aktürk forfeited the match against Akhmed Magamaev, who competed for Bulgaria, because he did not show up for the match due to his injury and reached the quarterfinals. In the quarterfinals, he lost to Kazakh Rizabek Aitmukhan with 11-0 technical superiority. He qualified for the repechage after his opponent reached the final. In the first round of the repechage, he defeated his Hungarian opponent Balázs Juhász with a 10-0 technical superiority and advanced to the bronze medal match.

Feyzullah Aktürk became for the third time European champion for the third time in a row by defeating Boris Makoev, competing for Slovakia, 8-0 in the men's freestyle men's 92 kg final match at the 2024 European Wrestling Championships in Bucharest, Romania. After bypassing the first round, Feyzullah Aktürk reached the final by beating Polish Michal Bielawski 10-0 with technical superiority in the second round, Moldovan Andrian Grosul 8-1 in the quarterfinals and Georgian Miriani Maisuradze 8-0 in the semifinals.

At the 2025 European Wrestling Championships held in Bratislava, Slovakia, in the men's 92 kg competition, after bypassing the first round, he reached the semifinals by defeating Rahmatullah Moradi competing for Germany 7-0 in the second round and Italian Ben Honis 12-2 in the quarterfinals. In the semifinal, he drew 3-3 with Dauren Kurugliev competing on behalf of Greece and lost with the first point disadvantage. In the third place medal match, he defeated Akhmed Bataev from Bulgaria 8-6 and won the bronze medal.

== Achievements ==
Year	Tournament	Location	Result	Event
2022	European Championships	Budapest, Hungary	1st	Freestyle 92 kg
2022	Mediterranean Games	Oran, Algeria	2nd	Freestyle 97 kg
2023	World Championships	Belgrade, Serbia	3rd	Freestyle 92 kg
2023	European Championships	Budapest, Hungary	1st	Freestyle 92 kg
2024	European Championships	Bucharest, Romania	1st	Freestyle 92 kg
2025	European Championships	Bratislava, Slovakia	3rd	Freestyle 92 kg
