= 2024 World Wrestling Championships – Men's freestyle 92 kg =

Wrestling competitions

Men's freestyle 92 kg at the 2024 World Championships
- Venue: Tirana Olympic Park
- Dates: 30–31 October 2024
- Competitors: 29 from 27 nations

Medalists
gold medal	Abdulrashid Sadulaev
silver medal	Miriani Maisuradze	Georgia
bronze medal	David Taylor	United States
bronze medal	Batyrbek Tsakulov	Slovakia

The men's freestyle 92 kilograms is a competition featured at the 2024 World Wrestling Championships, and was held in Tirana, Albania on 30 and 31 October.

This freestyle wrestling competition consists of a single-elimination tournament, with a repechage used to determine the winner of two bronze medals. The two finalists face off for gold and silver medals. Each wrestler who loses to one of the two finalists moves into the repechage, culminating in a pair of bronze medal matches, featuring the semifinal losers each facing the remaining repechage opponent from their half of the bracket.

Each bout consists of a single round within a six-minute limit, including two halves of three minutes. The wrestler who scores more points is the winner.

== Results ==
Legend

- F — Won by fall

=== Final ===
Final
Abdulrashid Sadulaev (AIN)	6
Miriani Maisuradze (GEO)	0

=== Top half ===
Round of 32
Kamran Ghasempour (IRI)	6
Takashi Ishiguro (JPN)	0
Samuel Scherrer (SUI)	11
Egzon Shala (KOS)	0
Ivan Ichizli (MDA)	11
Ivars Samušonoks (LAT)	1
Redjep Hajdari (MKD)	0
Abubakr Abakarov (AZE)	10
David Taylor (USA)	0
Abdulrashid Sadulaev (AIN)	7
Lars Schäfle (GER)	3
Domantas Pauliuščenko (LTU)	0
Igor Sarkisian (ARM)	0
Akhmed Magamaev (BUL)	10

Round of 16
Feyzullah Aktürk (TUR)	0
Kamran Ghasempour (IRI)	11
Samuel Scherrer (SUI)	3
Ivan Ichizli (MDA)	8
Abubakr Abakarov (AZE)	1
Abdulrashid Sadulaev (AIN)	3
Lars Schäfle (GER)	2
Akhmed Magamaev (BUL)	2

Quarterfinals
Kamran Ghasempour (IRI)	10^{F}
Ivan Ichizli (MDA)	0
Abdulrashid Sadulaev (AIN)	10
Lars Schäfle (GER)	0

Semifinals
Kamran Ghasempour (IRI)	3
Abdulrashid Sadulaev (AIN)	5

=== Bottom half ===
Round of 32
Ben Honis (ITA)	7
Lin Zushen (CHN)	3
Matt Finesilver (ISR)	7
Andrew Johnson (CAN)	10
Cezary Sadowski (POL)	0
Ganbaataryn Gankhuyag (MGL)	5
Yaraslau Iadkouski (AIN)	0
Illia Archaia (UKR)	2
Batyrbek Tsakulov (SVK)	10
Marjus Malko (ALB)	0
Sandeep Singh Mann (IND)	8
Nurdaulet Bekenov (KAZ)	4

Round of 16
Balázs Juhász (HUN)	0
Ben Honis (ITA)	11
Andrew Johnson (CAN)	0
Ganbaataryn Gankhuyag (MGL)	6
Illia Archaia (UKR)	0
Batyrbek Tsakulov (SVK)	10
Sandeep Singh Mann (IND)	0
Miriani Maisuradze (GEO)	10

Quarterfinals
Ben Honis (ITA)	7
Ganbaataryn Gankhuyag (MGL)	5
Batyrbek Tsakulov (SVK)	2
Miriani Maisuradze (GEO)	4

Semifinals
Ben Honis (ITA)	2
Miriani Maisuradze (GEO)	9

=== Repechage ===
Repechage round 1
David Taylor (USA)	3
Abubakr Abakarov (AZE)	1

Repechage round 2
David Taylor (USA)	11
Lars Schäfle (GER)	1
Sandeep Singh Mann (IND)	0
Batyrbek Tsakulov (SVK)	10

Bronze medals
David Taylor (USA)	6
Kamran Ghasempour (IRI)	2
Batyrbek Tsakulov (SVK)	8
Ben Honis (ITA)	6

== Final standing ==
Rank	Athlete
1st place, gold medalist(s)	Abdulrashid Sadulaev (AIN)
2nd place, silver medalist(s)	Miriani Maisuradze (GEO)
3rd place, bronze medalist(s)	David Taylor (USA)
3rd place, bronze medalist(s)	Batyrbek Tsakulov (SVK)
5	Kamran Ghasempour (IRI)
5	Ben Honis (ITA)
7	Ivan Ichizli (MDA)
8	Ganbaataryn Gankhuyag (MGL)
9	Lars Schäfle (GER)
10	Abubakr Abakarov (AZE)
11	Samuel Scherrer (SUI)
12	Akhmed Magamaev (BUL)
13	Andrew Johnson (CAN)
14	Sandeep Singh Mann (IND)
15	Illia Archaia (UKR)
16	Matt Finesilver (ISR)
17	Nurdaulet Bekenov (KAZ)
18	Lin Zushen (CHN)
19	Ivars Samušonoks (LAT)
20	Yaraslau Iadkouski (AIN)
21	Domantas Pauliuščenko (LTU)
22	Cezary Sadowski (POL)
23	Takashi Ishiguro (JPN)
24	Redjep Hajdari (MKD)
25	Igor Sarkisian (ARM)
26	Marjus Malko (ALB)
27	Feyzullah Aktürk (TUR)
28	Balázs Juhász (HUN)
29	Egzon Shala (KOS)
