= 2025 European Wrestling Championships – Men's freestyle 92 kg =

Wrestling competition

Men's freestyle 92 kg at the 2025 European Wrestling Championships
- Venue: X-Bionic Sphere
- Location: Bratislava, Slovakia
- Dates: 8-9 April
- Competitors: 18

Medalists
gold medal	Dauren Kurugliev	Greece
silver medal	Osman Nurmagomedov	Azerbaijan
bronze medal	Miriani Maisuradze	Georgia
bronze medal	Feyzullah Aktürk	Turkey

The men's freestyle 92 kg is a competition featured at the 2025 European Wrestling Championships, and was held in Bratislava, Slovakia on April 8 and 9.

== Results ==
Legend

- F — Won by fall

=== Final ===
Final
Osman Nurmagomedov (AZE)	4
Dauren Kurugliev (GRE)	5

=== Top half ===
Round of 32
Adlan Viskhanov (FRA)	7
Azamat Zakuev (UWW)	6

Round of 16
Miriani Maisuradze (GEO)	11
Cezary Sadowski (POL)	0
Adlan Viskhanov (FRA)	4
Benjamin Greil (AUT)	2
Osman Nurmagomedov (AZE)	11
Denys Sahaliuk (UKR)	0
Yaraslau Iadkouski (UWW)	4
Boris Makoev (SVK)	2

Quarterfinals
Miriani Maisuradze (GEO)	4
Adlan Viskhanov (FRA)	1
Osman Nurmagomedov (AZE)	10
Yaraslau Iadkouski (UWW)	0

Semifinals
Miriani Maisuradze (GEO)	2
Osman Nurmagomedov (AZE)	5

=== Bottom half ===
Round of 32

Round of 16
Ivan Ichizli (MDA)	8
Redjep Hajdari (MKD)	2
Akhmed Bataev (BUL)	0
Dauren Kurugliev (GRE)	5
Rahmatullah Moradi (GER)	0
Feyzullah Aktürk (TUR)	7
Uri Kalashnikov (ISR)	0
Ben Honis (ITA)	2

Quarterfinals
Ivan Ichizli (MDA)	0
Dauren Kurugliev (GRE)	10
Feyzullah Aktürk (TUR)	12
Ben Honis (ITA)	2

Semifinals
Dauren Kurugliev (GRE)	3
Feyzullah Aktürk (TUR)	3

Repechage round 2
Denys Sahaliuk (UKR)	2
Yaraslau Iadkouski (UWW)	5
Akhmed Bataev (BUL)	7
Ivan Ichizli (MDA)	0

Bronze medal match
Yaraslau Iadkouski (UWW)	0
Miriani Maisuradze (GEO)	5
Akhmed Bataev (BUL)	6
Feyzullah Aktürk (TUR)	8

== Final standing ==
Rank	Athlete
1st place, gold medalist(s)	Dauren Kurugliev (GRE)
2nd place, silver medalist(s)	Osman Nurmagomedov (AZE)
3rd place, bronze medalist(s)	Miriani Maisuradze (GEO)
3rd place, bronze medalist(s)	Feyzullah Aktürk (TUR)
5	Yaraslau Iadkouski (UWW)
5	Akhmed Bataev (BUL)
7	Adlan Viskhanov (FRA)
8	Ben Honis (ITA)
9	Ivan Ichizli (MDA)
10	Azamat Zakuev (UWW)
11	Boris Makoev (SVK)
12	Benjamin Greil (AUT)
13	Redjep Hajdari (MKD)
14	Denys Sahaliuk (UKR)
15	Uri Kalashnikov (ISR)
16	Rahmatullah Moradi (GER)
17	Cezary Sadowski (POL)
