= David Taylor (wrestler, born 1990) =

American wrestler (born 1990)

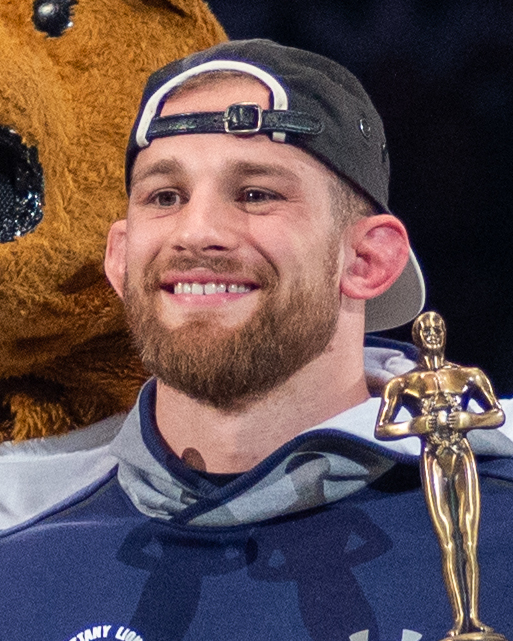
- Taylor in 2020

Personal information
- Full name: David Morris Taylor III
- Nickname: Magic Man
- Born: December 5, 1990 (age 35) Reno, Nevada, U.S.
- Home town: St. Paris, Ohio, U.S.
- Height: 6 ft 0 in (183 cm)
- Weight: 86 kg (190 lb)

Sport
- Country: United States
- Sport: Wrestling
- Events: Freestyle and Folkstyle
- College team: Penn State
- Club: Cowboy Wrestling Club
- Team: USA
- Coached by: Cael Sanderson
Medal record
Men's freestyle wrestling
Representing the United States
Olympic Games
Gold medal – first place	2020 Tokyo	86 kg
World Championships
Gold medal – first place	2018 Budapest	86 kg
Gold medal – first place	2022 Belgrade	86 kg
Gold medal – first place	2023 Belgrade	86 kg
Silver medal – second place	2021 Oslo	86 kg
Bronze medal – third place	2024 Tirana	92 kg
World Cup
Gold medal – first place	2018 Iowa City	Team
Silver medal – second place	2017 Kermanshah	Team
Pan American Championships
Gold medal – first place	2018 Lima	86 kg
Gold medal – first place	2019 Buenos Aires	86 kg
Gold medal – first place	2021 Guatemala	86 kg
Golden Grand Prix Ivan Yarygin
Gold medal – first place	2018 Krasnoyarsk	86 kg
World University Games
Bronze medal – third place	2013 Kazan	74 kg
US Open Championships
Gold medal – first place	2015 Las Vegas	74 kg
Gold medal – first place	2017 Las Vegas	86 kg
Gold medal – first place	2018 Las Vegas	86 kg
Silver medal – second place	2013 Las Vegas	74 kg
Silver medal – second place	2014 Las Vegas	74 kg
Silver medal – second place	2015 Las Vegas (SN)	86 kg
Men's collegiate wrestling
Representing the Penn State Nittany Lions
NCAA Division I Championships
Gold medal – first place	2012 St. Louis	165 lb
Gold medal – first place	2014 Oklahoma City	165 lb
Silver medal – second place	2011 Philadelphia	157 lb
Silver medal – second place	2013 Des Moines	165 lb
Big Ten Championships
Gold medal – first place	2011 Evanston	157 lb
Gold medal – first place	2012 West Lafayette	165 lb
Gold medal – first place	2013 Illinois	165 lb
Gold medal – first place	2014 Madison	165 lb

David Morris Taylor III (born December 5, 1990) is an American former freestyle and folkstyle wrestler who competed in the 74, 86, and 92-kilogram categories. He is the current head coach of the Oklahoma State Cowboys.

With his most prestigious accolades coming at 86 kilograms, Taylor was most notably the 2020 Summer Olympic gold medalist; a world champion in 2018, 2022, and 2023; and held one of the biggest rivalries in the sport's history against Hassan Yazdani.

One of the most accomplished Nittany Lions in the history of the Penn State program, Taylor was twice the NCAA Division I national champion at 165 pounds, and twice earned the Dan Hodge Trophy.

== Early life and education ==
Taylor was born in Reno, Nevada, on December 5, 1990. His family moved to Wyoming before he was five. His mother saw an ad in the newspaper for youth wrestling at Evanston High School in Evanston, Wyoming, where Taylor started wrestling. Although initially not having much success his first year, Taylor developed a passion to keep improving and eventually started winning local and national tournaments as a youth wrestler.

At age nine, he attended the Jeff Jordan State Champ Camp in Ohio, and kept coming back to attend the camp each fall. By the time he was in sixth grade, his family moved to Ohio. Taylor attended Graham High School in St. Paris, Ohio, where he wrestled for coach Jeff Jordan. As a high schooler, Taylor became a four-time OHSAA state champion with an outstanding 180–2 record and graduated with a 4.0 GPA. He received the Dave Schultz High School Excellence Award in 2009 as the nation's top high school wrestler.

During his time at Penn State from 2009 to 2014, Taylor was a two-time NCAA Division I national champion (four-time finalist), a four-time Big Ten Conference champion, and two-time Dan Hodge Trophy winner. After a perfect freshman year to that point, Taylor was pinned by Arizona State's Bubba Jenkins at the NCAA finals. As a sophomore, he moved up from 157 pounds (71 kg) to 165 lb (75 kg), winning the NCAA title and being named the best college wrestler in the US as the Dan Hodge Trophy winner with a 70–1 overall record.

As a junior, he faced Kyle Dake from Cornell in the NCAA finals, who moved up to attempt to become the third four-time NCAA champion and the first to win titles at four different weight classes in the history of the NCAA. After a back-and-forth battle, Taylor was defeated 5–4. As a senior, he once again had an undefeated campaign, claimed his second NCAA title, helped clinch the team title for the Nittany Lions, and became the third multiple-time Dan Hodge Trophy winner in history. Taylor graduated with 134 wins and three losses, 50 pins, 42 technical falls, and 29 major decisions.

== Career ==
=== 2010–2012 ===
Taylor made his freestyle debut in April 2010, when he claimed a university U.S. national title. In 2012, he competed at the US Olympic Team Trials, where he went 3–2.

=== 2013–2014 ===
In 2013, Taylor claimed runner-up honors at the U.S. Open in April, defeating Nick Marable to reach the finals and then being downed by defending Olympic champion Jordan Burroughs. After pinning 2012 junior world champion Magomed Kurbanaliev from Russia at Beat the Streets, Taylor became a two-time U.S. university national champion and made the US University World Team on May. At the 2013 US World Team Trials Challenge in June, Taylor went 4–1 with a lone loss to four-time NCAA Division I national champion Kyle Dake to claim third place. At the 2013 Summer Universiade, he claimed a bronze medal for the United States.

In 2014, the prior year's U.S. Open result was repeated when Taylor fell to Jordan Burroughs, this rematch being closer and forcing the now defending world champion to come from behind for a last-minute comeback. After dominating the eventual 2016 Olympic bronze medalist and then-two-time world bronze medalist and two-time European champion Jabrayil Hasanov at Beat the Streets, Taylor made the U.S. World Team Trials final, but was defeated twice in a row by Burroughs.

=== 2015–2016 ===
Now focusing on freestyle full time after graduating from college, Taylor opened 2015 with a fifth-place finish at the Yasar Dogu, where he went 3–2. He then claimed his first US Open National title in May, followed up by a technical fall over Cuba's Liván López at Beat the Streets. In his fourth attempt to make the US World Team, Taylor was once again overpowered by Kyle Dake in the challenge tournament, but he came back and claimed the third place when he beat veteran Andrew Howe. Taylor then claimed Grand Prix of Spain and Stepan Sargsyan Cup gold medals in July, before making the decision to bulk up to the 86 kilogram division on September. Taylor took fifth-place at the Golden Grand Prix of November, and seemed overpowered in his first tournament at a new weight class. In December, Taylor competed at the US Senior Nationals, and after running through '14 US World Team member and teammate Ed Ruth, Taylor was defeated by long-time rival Kyle Dake.

In 2016, Taylor was unable to make the US Olympic Team, as he was defeated by Dake for the fifth time in the senior level, forcing Taylor to battle for the bronze medal, which he comfortably earned. He then claimed his second Spain Grand Prix title on July, and competed again at the World Clubs Cup of December, where he went 3-1 and helped TMWC reach the first-place, while also defeating the accomplished Alireza Karimi.

=== 2017 ===
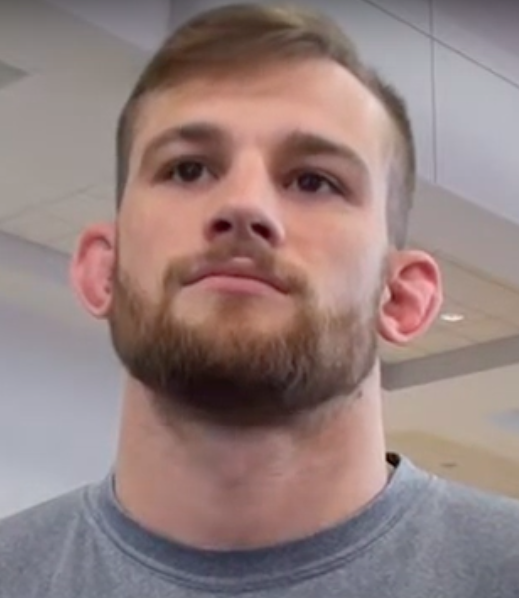
Taylor in 2017

In his first competition of the year, Taylor dominated the Grand Prix of Paris in January, and despite being initially banned by the Government of the Islamic Republic of Iran, he competed at the World Cup in February in Iran. At the World Cup, he defeated four top-level opponents: '12 Olympic bronze medalist and two-time European Champion Dato Marsagishvili in the first round (8-3), that year's World Championship bronze medalist Vladislav Valiev (TF 14–4), '12 Olympic Gold medalist Sharif Sharifov (TF 12–2), and '16 Olympic Gold medalist Hassan Yazdani (fall).

Taylor claimed his second US national title in April, with an overall score of 40–4 against five opponents. After a quick win at Beat the Streets, Taylor made the World Team Trials finals when he ran through '16 US OTT Greco-Roman champion Joe Rau and '12 Junior World Championship runner-up Pat Downey, and defeated three-time NCAA Division I All-American Nick Heflin to make the best-of-three, where he faced returning Olympic Bronze medalist J'den Cox. In the first match, Taylor rallied comfortably with a 9–3 win, but was closely defeated in the second match 4–3, leading to a controversial third bout due to Cox's sweat and alleged passivity, which caused Taylor to kick the challenge cube and his cornerman Cael Sanderson to throw items at the official and a chair onto the mat after losing 5–3.

He came back to competition at the World Clubs Cup on December, where he helped the TMWC to second place with notable victories over Alireza Karimi and Pawan Kumar.

=== 2018 ===
To start off the year, Taylor became only the 12th American to claim a gold medal at the Ivan Yarygin Golden Grand Prix, considered the toughest open tournament in the world. He opened with a win over two-time (and defending) Pan American champion Yurieski Torreblanca, followed by Selim Yaşar on points and a fall over '17 Junior World Champion Artur Naifonov to make the finals. In the finals, he got another fall, this time over Fatih Erdin, to claim the gold medal. On April, he claimed his second consecutive World Cup championship, recording four technical falls to help secure the gold medal for the United States. He also clinched his third US National title, with four victories over fellow Americans.

On May, he claimed his first Pan American title, with notable wins over Yurieski Torreblanca, Pool Ambrocio and Eduardo Gajardo. On his seventh attempt to make the US World/Olympic Team, Taylor finally and dominantly was able to punch tickets to the World Championships, when he defeated '18 Bill Farrell Memorial medalist Nick Reenan twice via technical fall on May, at Final X: State College. He then warmed up at the Yasar Dogu of July, with four dominant pins over foreigners.

At the World Championships, Taylor had a tough start, as he faced his biggest threat of the tournament in the first round, '16 Olympic Gold medalist and defending World champion Hassan Yazdani from Iran. After being down two points to six at the end of the first period, Taylor was able to overcome adversity and put on nine points on his side, finishing the legendary match 11–6. In the next round, he tech'd '18 Alexander Medved champion Hajy Rajabau from Belarus, to advance to the quarterfinals. Next, he picked apart the accomplished Cuban Yurieski Torreblanca, to pick up an 8–0 victory. In the semifinals, he had it harder, as he went to the distance against the '17 European Champion and Russia's best Dauren Kurugliev, but was able to score the comeback win 7–5. During the match, Taylor got briefly knocked out after Kurugliev accidentally wheel kicked him on the chin when escaping a single leg attempt by Taylor. In the finals, he dismantled Fatih Erdin from Turkey, overwhelming his opposition with 12 points to two, to claim the World Championship and help Team USA reach third place.

After the year was over, Taylor was named the UWW International Freestyle wrestler of the Year, and was awarded the John Smith Award winner as USA's Freestyle wrestler of the Year.

=== 2019–2020 ===
After time off competition, the returning World Champion came back in April 2019, when he claimed his second straight Pan American title, tournament in where he scored 34 points to none against his four opponents and Team USA claimed all ten medals in freestyle. On May, he competed at the annual Beat the Streets for charity, against Drew Foster, where he suffered a severe knee injury which led him to forfeit out of the match, and ultimately, forced him to stay inactive during the whole year, missing the opportunity to make his second US World Team (forfeiting it to Pat Downey instead, whom he had tech'd twice), to represent the United States at the 2019 Pan American Games or to defend his title at the World Championships.

After almost a full year of no competition, Taylor came back to wrestle in March 2020, at the Pan American Olympic Qualification Tournament. He comfortably got three wins to win the bracket and internationally qualify for the 2020 Summer Olympics. Taylor was then scheduled to compete at the US Olympic Team Trials on April 4 at State College, Pennsylvania, where he was a heavy favorite. However, the event was postponed for 2021 along with the Summer Olympics due to the COVID-19 pandemic, leaving all the qualifiers unable to compete.

Taylor was unable to compete for a couple of months due to the pandemic, but was scheduled to wrestle Pat Downey (whom he was unable to wrestle at the '19 US World Trials) on July 25, at FloWrestling: Dake vs. Chamizo. After Downey pulled out of the bout due to problems with the organization, Taylor wrestled and tech'd the accomplished Myles Martin. After more months of inactiveness, Taylor defeated two-time NCAA champion Gabe Dean by points on November 24, at the NLWC III.

=== 2021 ===
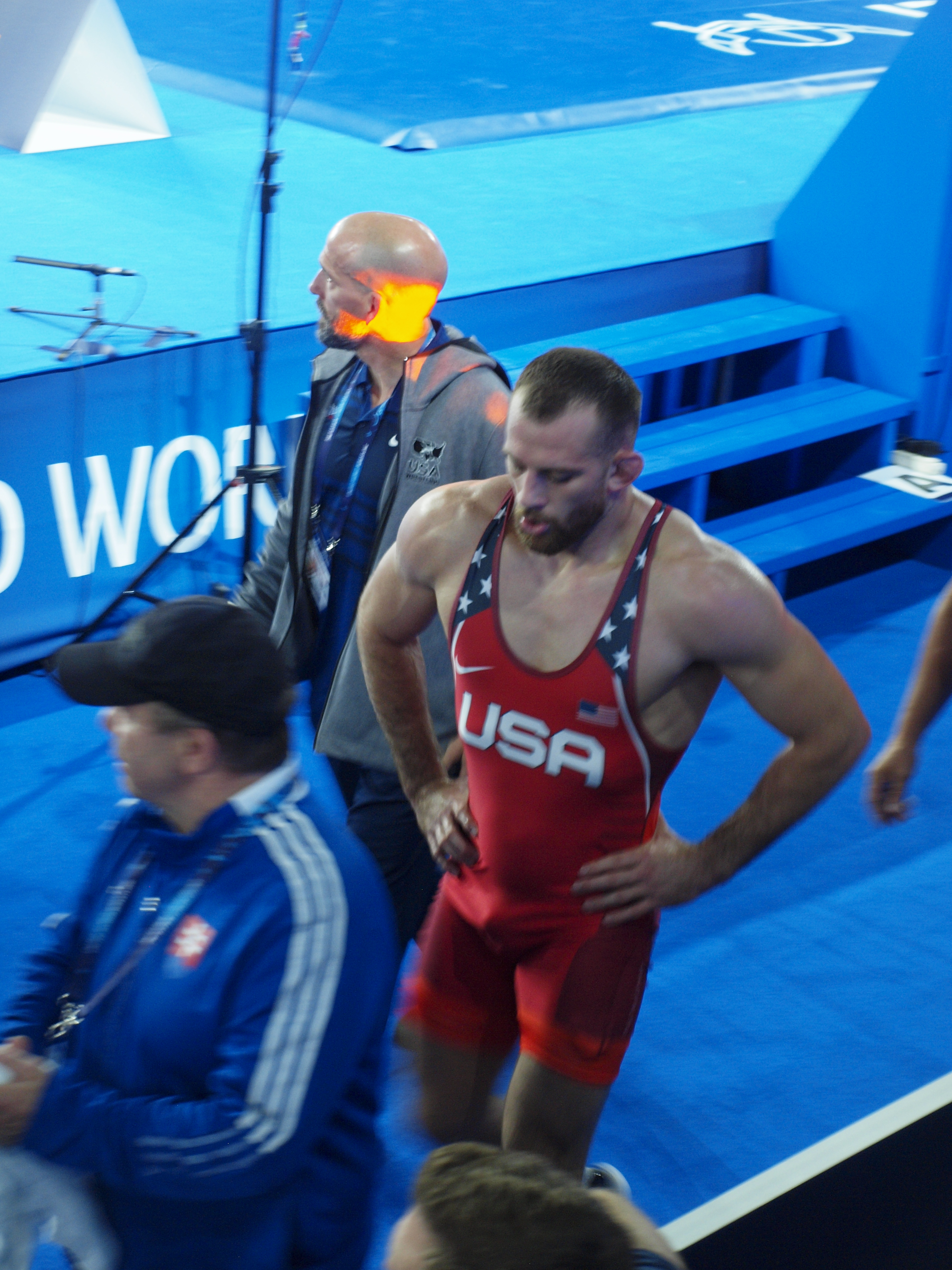
Taylor at the 2021 World Championships

To start the year, Taylor was scheduled to face his former rival and five-time World and Olympic champion (at 74 kg) Jordan Burroughs, at 86 kilos, on January 9, while headlining FloWrestling: Burroughs vs. Taylor. However, it was announced on January 8 that Taylor was unable to travel to Austin, Texas due to COVID-19 restrictions and the bout was subsequently postponed for four days later and changed its location for Lincoln, Nebraska, thus moving to a different card also named FloWrestling: Burroughs vs. Taylor. After a 4–0 lead for Taylor in the first period, Burroughs rallied late to score four points of his own, but was unable to secure the victory as Taylor had criteria, defeating Burroughs for the first time in five matches. Taylor was also scheduled to compete at the Grand Prix de France Henri Deglane on January 16, but was not able to travel due to the postponement of his match against Burroughs.

During April 2 to 3, Taylor competed at the rescheduled US Olympic Team Trials as the heavy favorite and top–seed. After cleaning out All–American Brett Pfarr in the quarterfinal round, Taylor flawlessly knocked off reigning US National champion Gabe Dean in a rematch from their match at the NLWC III, advancing to the best–of–three finals. In the finale, Taylor faced reigning U23 World Champion and Penn State legend Bo Nickal, whom he is close with as a friend and teammate at the Nittany Lion Wrestling Club. He defeated Nickal twice and did not allow him to score any points while scoring ten combined points of his own, becoming the US Olympic Team Member at 86 kilograms, and qualifying him to represent the United States at the 2020 Summer Olympics. In regards to his close relationship with Nickal, Taylor then stated:

"It was a weird emotion," Taylor said. "We had a discussion leading up to it, and we have such a deep room in the wrestling club, especially at 86 kilos, so we're challenged every single day and none of us would be where we are without each other. Bo's amazing, and I wouldn't be where I am without Bo."

As a result, Taylor also competed at the Pan American Continental Championships on May 30. Taylor racked up 30 points against his three opponents while not getting scored on to claim the crown and help the USA reach all 10 freestyle medals.

On August 4, Taylor competed in the first date of men's freestyle 86 kg of the 2020 Summer Olympics, where he looked dominant enough to score technical falls over all of his three opponents on his way to the finals; four-time World Championship medalist Ali Shabanau from Belarus, '20 European Championship runner-up Myles Amine from San Marino and defending World silver medalist Deepak Punia from India. On the other side of the finale awaited rival and reigning Olympic and World Champion Hassan Yazdani from Iran, Taylor meeting him in a rubber match on August 5 after downing him twice earlier in his career. Down 0–2 to a step-out and a passivity point in the second period, Taylor scored the first takedown to tie it up, though Yazdani scored another step-out to make it 2–3 on his favor, before being blasted by Taylor for two points late in the match, resulting in the stunning upset comeback win, shocking the world as the underdog going into the match. This result gained Taylor the 2020 Summer Olympic Games gold medal and extended his win-streak to 54 matches.

As an Olympic medalist, Taylor earned the right to automatically represent the United States at the 2021 World Championships without having to compete domestically to make the US World Team, and did do so in October 2–3. On the first date, Taylor once again ran through his competition, dominating the likes of World Championship runner-ups Boris Makoev and Abubakr Abakarov to cruise to the finale. A fourth match with rival and reigning World Champion Hassan Yazdani took place in the finals, but this time the Iranian came up on top for the first time, nullifying Taylor and snapping his 57-match win streak, marking the series 3–1 in favor of Taylor and the latter leaving with a silver medal.

=== 2022 ===
In June, Taylor stopped two-time NCAA champion Zahid Valencia twice to make the US World Team once again, at Final X NYC. In September, after dominantly cruising to the finals, Taylor avenged his loss to Hassan Yazdani and claimed his second World championship.

=== 2023 ===
Repeating as Final X champion to become the US World Team member at the weight, Taylor defeated US National champion and teammate Aaron Brooks twice in a row in June. At the World Championships, Taylor dominated once again, defeating everyone on his way either by fall or technical fall, including Hassan Yazdani, leading 5–1 in the series.

=== 2024 ===
Competing at the US Olympic Trials in April, Taylor sat in the best-of-three finals as a 2023 World medalist, where he was upset twice in a row by now U23 World and four-time NCAA champion, as well as teammate, Aaron Brooks, losing the series and staying out of the 2024 Summer Olympics. In May, after becoming the head coach at Oklahoma State, Taylor expressed at a press conference that he had retired from the sport as a competitor, at the age of 33.

In September, Taylor, now the head coach of the Cowboys, announced he would come out of retirement to compete at the US World Team Trials up at 92 kilograms. After notorious wins on the first day over NCAA champion Michael Macchiavello and All-Americans Trent Hidlay and Marcus Coleman, Taylor made the best-of-three finals, where he faced returning World medalist Zahid Valencia. Then, after consecutive victories over Valencia, Taylor was back on the US World Team.

In October, he competed at his last World Championships, and in his first at 92 kilograms. In a battle of Tokyo Olympic champions, Taylor fell to seven–time World and Olympic champion Abdulrashid Sadulaev from Russia, in the first round. After being pulled back into repechage, Taylor bounced back defeating World medalist Abubakr Abakarov from Azerbaijan and Lars Schäfle from Germany to earn the right to contend for a bronze medal. In a battle of 2022 World champions, Taylor beat two-time World champion Kamran Ghasempour from Iran to earn the bronze medal, and subsequently retired from the sport as an athlete.

== Coaching career ==
=== Oklahoma State University ===
In May, a month after a runner-up finish at the 2024 U.S. Olympic Trials, Taylor was announced as the head coach at Oklahoma State University, following John Smith's retirement. During his first year, the Cowboys had a 13-1 dual-meet record; clinched the Big 12 Conference title with one individual champion; and finished third in the nation with six All-Americans and two individual national champions, Dean Hamiti at 174 and Wyatt Hendrickson at 285.

== Freestyle record ==
Senior Freestyle Matches
Res.	Record	Opponent	Score	Date	Event	Location
2024 World Championships (bronze) at 92 kg
Win	161–22	(Iran) Kamran Ghasempour	6–2	October 31, 2024	2024 World Championships	Tirana, Albania
Win	160–22	(Germany) Lars Schäfle	TF 11–1	October 30, 2024	2024 World Championships	Tirana, Albania
Win	159–22	(Azerbaijan) Abubakr Abakarov	3–1	October 30, 2024	2024 World Championships	Tirana, Albania
Loss	158–22	Abdulrashid Sadulaev	0–7	October 30, 2024	2024 World Championships	Tirana, Albania
2024 US World Team Trials (gold) at 92 kg
Win	158–21	(United States) Zahid Valencia	Fall	September 15, 2024	2024 US World Team Trials	(United States) Lincoln, Nebraska
Win	157–21	(United States) Zahid Valencia	3–3	September 15, 2024	2024 US World Team Trials	(United States) Lincoln, Nebraska
Win	156–21	(United States) Trent Hidlay	10–6	September 14, 2024	2024 US World Team Trials	(United States) Lincoln, Nebraska
Win	155–21	(United States) Michael Macchiavello	TF 10–0	September 14, 2024	2024 US World Team Trials	(United States) Lincoln, Nebraska
Win	154–21	(United States) Marcus Coleman	Fall	September 14, 2024	2024 US World Team Trials	(United States) Lincoln, Nebraska
Win	153–21	(United States) Aidan Brenot	TF 10–0	September 14, 2024	2024 US World Team Trials	(United States) Lincoln, Nebraska
2024 US Olympic Team Trials (silver) at 86 kg
Loss	152–21	(United States) Aaron Brooks	1–3	April 20, 2024	2024 US Olympic Team Trials	(United States) State College, Pennsylvania
Loss	152–20	(United States) Aaron Brooks	1–4	April 20, 2024	2024 US Olympic Team Trials	(United States) State College, Pennsylvania
2023 World Championships (gold) at 86 kg
Win	152–19	(Iran) Hassan Yazdani	Fall	September 17, 2023	2023 World Championships	Belgrade, Serbia
Win	151–19	(Kazakhstan) Azamat Dauletbekov	Fall	September 16, 2023	2023 World Championships	Belgrade, Serbia
Win	150–19	(Bahrain) Magomed Sharipov	TF 12–2	September 16, 2023	2023 World Championships	Belgrade, Serbia
Win	149–19	(Austria) Benjamin Greil	TF 10–0	September 16, 2023	2023 World Championships	Belgrade, Serbia
Win	148–19	(Morocco) Sofiane Padiou Belmir	Fall	September 16, 2023	2023 World Championships	Belgrade, Serbia
2023 US World Team Trials (gold) at 86 kg
Win	147–19	(United States) Aaron Brooks	5–4	June 10, 2023	2023 Final X Newark	(United States) Newark, New Jersey
Win	146–19	(United States) Aaron Brooks	6–0	June 10, 2023	2023 Final X Newark	(United States) Newark, New Jersey
2022 World Championships (gold) at 86 kg
Win	145–19	(Iran) Hassan Yazdani	7-1	September 16, 2022	2022 World Championships	Belgrade, Serbia
Win	144–19	(Kazakhstan) Azamat Dauletbekov	TF 12–0	September 15, 2022	2022 World Championships	Belgrade, Serbia
Win	143–19	(Puerto Rico) Ethan Ramos	TF 11–0	September 15, 2022	2022 World Championships	Belgrade, Serbia
Win	142–19	(Italy) Aron Caneva	TF 10–0	September 15, 2022	2022 World Championships	Belgrade, Serbia
2022 US World Team Trials (gold) at 86 kg
Win	141–19	(United States) Zahid Valencia	TF 10–0	June 8, 2022	2022 Final X NYC	(United States) New York City, New York
Win	140–19	(United States) Zahid Valencia	4–2	June 8, 2022	2022 Final X NYC	(United States) New York City, New York
2021 World Championships (silver) at 86 kg
Loss	139–19	(Iran) Hassan Yazdani	2–6	October 3, 2021	2021 World Championships	Oslo, Norway
Win	139–18	(Azerbaijan) Abubakr Abakarov	Fall	October 2, 2021	2021 World Championships	Oslo, Norway
Win	138–18	(France) Akhmed Aibuev	Fall	October 2, 2021	2021 World Championships	Oslo, Norway
Win	137–18	(Slovakia) Boris Makoev	TF 11–0	October 2, 2021	2021 World Championships	Oslo, Norway
2020 Summer Olympics (gold) at 86 kg
Win	136–18	(Iran) Hassan Yazdani	4–3	August 5, 2021	2020 Summer Olympics	Tokyo, Japan
Win	135–18	(India) Deepak Punia	TF 10–0	August 4, 2021	2020 Summer Olympics	Tokyo, Japan
Win	134–18	(San Marino) Myles Amine	TF 12–2	August 4, 2021	2020 Summer Olympics	Tokyo, Japan
Win	133–18	(Belarus) Ali Shabanau	TF 11–0	August 4, 2021	2020 Summer Olympics	Tokyo, Japan
2021 Pan American Championships (gold) at 86 kg
Win	132–18	(Canada) Clayton Pye	TF 10–0	May 30, 2021	2021 Pan American Continental Championships	Guatemala City, Guatemala
Win	131–18	(Colombia) Juan Sebastián Rivera	TF 10–0	May 30, 2021	2021 Pan American Continental Championships	Guatemala City, Guatemala
Win	130–18	(Mexico) Noel Alfonso Torres	TF 10–0	May 30, 2021	2021 Pan American Continental Championships	Guatemala City, Guatemala
2020 US Olympic Team Trials (gold) at 86 kg
Win	129–18	(United States) Bo Nickal	6–0	April 2–3, 2021	2020 US Olympic Team Trials	(United States) Fort Worth, Texas
Win	128–18	(United States) Bo Nickal	4–0	April 2–3, 2021	2020 US Olympic Team Trials	(United States) Fort Worth, Texas
Win	127–18	(United States) Gabe Dean	4–0	April 2–3, 2021	2020 US Olympic Team Trials	(United States) Fort Worth, Texas
Win	126–18	(United States) Brett Pfarr	TF 11–0	April 2–3, 2021	2020 US Olympic Team Trials	(United States) Fort Worth, Texas
Win	125–18	(United States) Jordan Burroughs	4–4	January 13, 2021	FloWrestling: Burroughs vs. Taylor	(United States) Lincoln, Nebraska
Win	124–18	(United States) Gabe Dean	6–2	November 24, 2020	NLWC III	(United States) State College, Pennsylvania
Win	123–18	(United States) Myles Martin	TF 11–0	July 25, 2020	FloWrestling: Dake vs. Chamizo	(United States) Austin, Texas
2020 Pan American Olympic Qualification Tournament (gold) at 86 kg
Win	122–18	(Peru) Pool Ambrocio	FF	March 15, 2020	2020 Pan American Olympic Qualification Tournament	Ottawa, Canada
Win	121–18	(Cuba) Yurieski Torreblanca	8–0	March 15, 2020	2020 Pan American Olympic Qualification Tournament	Ottawa, Canada
Win	120–18	(Venezuela) Pedro Ceballos	Fall	March 15, 2020	2020 Pan American Olympic Qualification Tournament	Ottawa, Canada
2019 Pan American Championships (gold) at 86 kg
Win	119–18	(Venezuela) Pedro Ceballos	TF 10–0	April 19–21, 2019	2019 Pan American Continental Championships	Buenos Aires, Argentina
Win	118–18	(Cuba) Lazaro Hernandez	TF 10–0	April 19–21, 2019	2019 Pan American Continental Championships	Buenos Aires, Argentina
Win	117–18	(Argentina) Meruzhan Nikoyan	6–0	April 19–21, 2019	2019 Pan American Continental Championships	Buenos Aires, Argentina
Win	116–18	(The Bahamas) Rashji Mackey	8–0	April 19–21, 2019	2019 Pan American Continental Championships	Buenos Aires, Argentina
2018 World Championships (gold) at 86 kg
Win	115–18	(Turkey) Fatih Erdin	TF 12–2	October 20–21, 2018	2018 World Championships	Budapest, Hungary
Win	114–18	(Russia) Dauren Kurugliev	7–5	October 20–21, 2018	2018 World Championships	Budapest, Hungary
Win	113–18	(Cuba) Yurieski Torreblanca	8–0	October 20–21, 2018	2018 World Championships	Budapest, Hungary
Win	112–18	(Belarus) Hajy Rajabau	TF 10–0	October 20–21, 2018	2018 World Championships	Budapest, Hungary
Win	111–18	(Iran) Hassan Yazdani	11–6	October 20–21, 2018	2018 World Championships	Budapest, Hungary
2018 Yaşar Doğu International (gold) at 86 kg
Win	110–18	(Azerbaijan) Murad Suleymanov	Fall	July 27–29, 2018	2018 Yaşar Doğu International	Istanbul, Turkey
Win	109–18	(Turkey) Ahmet Bilici	Fall	July 27–29, 2018	2018 Yaşar Doğu International	Istanbul, Turkey
Win	108–18	(Slovakia) Boris Makoev	Fall	July 27–29, 2018	2018 Yaşar Doğu International	Istanbul, Turkey
Win	107–18	(Kazakhstan) Azamat Dauletbekov	Fall	July 27–29, 2018	2018 Yaşar Doğu International	Istanbul, Turkey
2018 US World Team Trials (gold) at 86 kg
Win	106–18	(United States) Nick Reenan	TF 12–0	June 15–16, 2018	2018 Final X: State College	(United States) State College, Pennsylvania
Win	105–18	(United States) Nick Reenan	TF 13–2	June 15–16, 2018	2018 Final X: State College	(United States) State College, Pennsylvania
2018 Pan American Championships (gold) at 86 kg
Win	104–18	(Cuba) Yurieski Torreblanca	3–2	May 3–6, 2018	2018 Pan American Continental Championships	Lima, Peru
Win	103–18	(Dominican Republic) Julio Rodriguez Romero	3–0	May 3–6, 2018	2018 Pan American Continental Championships	Lima, Peru
Win	102–18	(Peru) Pool Ambrocio	TF 11–0	May 3–6, 2018	2018 Pan American Continental Championships	Lima, Peru
Win	101–18	(Chile) Eduardo Gajardo	TF 12–2	May 3–6, 2018	2018 Pan American Continental Championships	Lima, Peru
2018 US Open (gold) at 86 kg
Win	100–18	(United States) Richard Perry	8–0	April 24–28, 2018	2018 US Open National Championships	(United States) Las Vegas, Nevada
Win	99–18	(United States) T.J. Dudley	TF 12–2	April 24–28, 2018	2018 US Open National Championships	(United States) Las Vegas, Nevada
Win	98–18	(United States) Noe Garcia	2–0	April 24–28, 2018	2018 US Open National Championships	(United States) Las Vegas, Nevada
Win	97–18	(United States) Austin Coburn	TF 10–0	April 24–28, 2018	2018 US Open National Championships	(United States) Las Vegas, Nevada
Win	96–18	(United States) Evan Hansen	TF 10–0	April 24–28, 2018	2018 US Open National Championships	(United States) Las Vegas, Nevada
2018 World Cup (gold) at 86 kg
Win	95–18	(Azerbaijan) Aleksandr Gostiyev	TF 12–2	April 7, 2018	2018 World Cup	(United States) Iowa City, Iowa
Win	94–18	(Georgia (country)) Davit Khutsishvili	TF 11–1	April 7, 2018	2018 World Cup	(United States) Iowa City, Iowa
Win	93–18	(Japan) Masao Matsusaka	TF 12–2	April 7, 2018	2018 World Cup	(United States) Iowa City, Iowa
Win	92–18	(India) Pawan Kumar	TF 10–0	April 7, 2018	2018 World Cup	(United States) Iowa City, Iowa
2018 Ivan Yarygin Gran Prix (gold) at 86 kg
Win	91–18	(Turkey) Fatih Erdin	Fall	January 28, 2018	Golden Grand Prix Ivan Yarygin 2018	Krasnoyarsk, Russia
Win	90–18	(Russia) Artur Naifonov	Fall	January 28, 2018	Golden Grand Prix Ivan Yarygin 2018	Krasnoyarsk, Russia
Win	89–18	(Turkey) Koloi Kartoev	4–1	January 28, 2018	Golden Grand Prix Ivan Yarygin 2018	Krasnoyarsk, Russia
Win	88–18	(Cuba) Yurieski Torreblanca	4–4	January 28, 2018	Golden Grand Prix Ivan Yarygin 2018	Krasnoyarsk, Russia
2017 World Clubs Cup (silver) for TMWC at 86 kg
Win	87–18	(Iran) Alireza Karimi	3–1	December 7–8, 2017	2017 World Clubs Cup	Tehran, Iran
Win	86–18	(Mongolia) Gankhuyag Ganbaatar	Fall	December 7–8, 2017	2017 World Clubs Cup	Tehran, Iran
Win	85–18	(Bulgaria) Petar Savakov	4–0	December 7–8, 2017	2017 World Clubs Cup	Tehran, Iran
Win	84–18	(India) Pawan Kumar	TF 10–0	December 7–8, 2017	2017 World Clubs Cup	Tehran, Iran
Win	83–18	(Canada) Alexander Moore	TF 14–4	December 7–8, 2017	2017 World Clubs Cup	Tehran, Iran
2017 US World Team Trials (silver) at 86 kg
Loss	82–18	(United States) J'den Cox	3–5	June 9–10, 2017	2017 US World Team Trials	(United States) Lincoln, Nebraska
Loss	82–17	(United States) J'den Cox	3–4	June 9–10, 2017	2017 US World Team Trials	(United States) Lincoln, Nebraska
Win	82–16	(United States) J'den Cox	9–3	June 9–10, 2017	2017 US World Team Trials	(United States) Lincoln, Nebraska
Win	81–16	(United States) Nick Heflin	13–9	June 9–10, 2017	2017 US World Team Trials Challenge Tournament	(United States) Lincoln, Nebraska
Win	80–16	(United States) Pat Downey	TF 10–0	June 9–10, 2017	2017 US World Team Trials Challenge Tournament	(United States) Lincoln, Nebraska
Win	79–16	(United States) Joe Rau	TF 13–0	June 9–10, 2017	2017 US World Team Trials Challenge Tournament	(United States) Lincoln, Nebraska
Win	78–16	(Japan) Takahiro Murayama	Fall	May 17, 2017	2017 Beat The Streets: Times Square	(United States) New York City, New York
2017 US Open (gold) at 86 kg
Win	77–16	(United States) Richard Perry	TF 10–0	April 26–29, 2017	2017 US Open National Championships	(United States) Las Vegas, Nevada
Win	76–16	(United States) Nick Heflin	TF 15–4	April 26–29, 2017	2017 US Open National Championships	(United States) Las Vegas, Nevada
Win	75–16	(United States) Pat Downey	TF 10–0	April 26–29, 2017	2017 US Open National Championships	(United States) Las Vegas, Nevada
Win	74–16	(United States) Chance McClure	TF 10–0	April 26–29, 2017	2017 US Open National Championships	(United States) Las Vegas, Nevada
Win	73–16	(United States) Anthony Cress	5–0	April 26–29, 2017	2017 US Open National Championships	(United States) Las Vegas, Nevada
2017 World Cup (gold) at 86 kg
Win	72–16	(Iran) Hassan Yazdani	Fall	February 16–17, 2017	2017 World Cup	Kermanshah, Iran
Win	71–16	(Azerbaijan) Sharif Sharifov	TF 12–2	February 16–17, 2017	2017 World Cup	Kermanshah, Iran
Win	70–16	(Russia) Vladislav Valiev	TF 14–4	February 16–17, 2017	2017 World Cup	Kermanshah, Iran
Win	69–16	(Georgia (country)) Dato Marsagishvili	8–3	February 16–17, 2017	2017 World Cup	Kermanshah, Iran
2017 Paris Grand Prix (gold) at 86 kg
Win	68–16	(United States) Richard Perry	8–5	January 28–29, 2017	2017 International Paris Grand Prix	Paris, France
Win	67–16	(France) Akhmed Aibuev	TF 12–2	January 28–29, 2017	2017 International Paris Grand Prix	Paris, France
Win	66–16	(Hungary) István Veréb	TF 10–0	January 28–29, 2017	2017 International Paris Grand Prix	Paris, France
Win	65–16	(Hungary) Mihaly Nagy	TF 10–0	January 28–29, 2017	2017 International Paris Grand Prix	Paris, France
2016 World Clubs Cup (gold) for TMWC at 86 kg
Win	64–16	(Iran) Alireza Karimi	12–6	November 30 – December 1, 2016	2016 World Clubs Cup	Kharkiv, Ukraine
Win	63–16	(Ukraine) Bohdan Hrytsay	TF 19–6	November 30 – December 1, 2016	2016 World Clubs Cup	Kharkiv, Ukraine
Loss	62–16	(Ukraine) Dmytro Rochniak	2–6	November 30 – December 1, 2016	2016 World Clubs Cup	Kharkiv, Ukraine
Win	62–15	(Georgia (country)) Nika Kentchadze	Fall	November 30 – December 1, 2016	2016 World Clubs Cup	Kharkiv, Ukraine
2016 Spain Grand Prix (gold) at 86 kg
Win	61–15	(Hungary) István Veréb	8–6	July 9–10, 2016	2016 Grand Prix of Spain	Madrid, Spain
Win	60–15	(Mongolia) Orgodolyn Üitümen	14–7	July 9–10, 2016	2016 Grand Prix of Spain	Madrid, Spain
Win	59–15	(United States) Anthony Valencia	10–3	July 9–10, 2016	2016 Grand Prix of Spain	Madrid, Spain
Win	58–15	(Iran) Vahid Shahmohammadiizad	6–2	July 9–10, 2016	2016 Grand Prix of Spain	Madrid, Spain
2016 US Olympic Team Trials (bronze) at 86 kg
Win	57–15	(United States) Andrew Howe	5–2	April 8–10, 2016	2016 US Olympic Team Trials	(United States) Iowa City, Iowa
Loss	56–15	(United States) Kyle Dake	4–11	April 8–10, 2016	2016 US Olympic Team Trials	(United States) Iowa City, Iowa
Win	56–14	(United States) Austin Trotman	5–2	April 8–10, 2016	2016 US Olympic Team Trials	(United States) Iowa City, Iowa
2015 US Nationals (silver) at 86 kg
Loss	55–14	(United States) Kyle Dake	4–11	December 18–19, 2015	2015 US Nationals – US Olympic Trials Qualifier	(United States) Las Vegas, Nevada
Win	55–13	(United States) Richard Perry	TF 11–0	December 18–19, 2015	2015 US Nationals – US Olympic Trials Qualifier	(United States) Las Vegas, Nevada
Win	54–13	(United States) Ed Ruth	TF 13–0	December 18–19, 2015	2015 US Nationals – US Olympic Trials Qualifier	(United States) Las Vegas, Nevada
2015 Golden Grand Prix 5th at 86 kg
Loss	53–13	(Iran) Ehsan Lashgari	TF 0–10	November 27–29, 2015	2015 Golden Grand Prix	Baku, Azerbaijan
Loss	53–12	(Azerbaijan) Gardiiyev Nurmagomed	0–6	November 27–29, 2015	2015 Golden Grand Prix	Baku, Azerbaijan
Win	53–11	(Uzbekistan) Umidjon Ismanov	8–4	November 27–29, 2015	2015 Golden Grand Prix	Baku, Azerbaijan
2015 Stepan Sargsyan Cup (gold) at 74 kg
Win	52–11	(Russia) Kakhaber Khubezhty	TF 12–2	July 18–19, 2015	2015 Stepan Sargsyan Tournament	Yerevan, Armenia
Win	51–11	(Ukraine) Giya Chikhladze	Fall	July 18–19, 2015	2015 Stepan Sargsyan Tournament	Yerevan, Armenia
Win	50–11	(Russia) Ruslan Rubaev	Fall	July 18–19, 2015	2015 Stepan Sargsyan Tournament	Yerevan, Armenia
2015 Spain Grand Prix (gold) at 74 kg
Win	49–11	(Italy) Carmelo Lumia	12–6	July 11, 2015	2015 Grand Prix of Spain	Madrid, Spain
Win	48–11	(China) Zhang Chongyao	9–1	July 11, 2015	2015 Grand Prix of Spain	Madrid, Spain
Win	47–11	(South Korea) Gong Byung-min	10–1	July 11, 2015	2015 Grand Prix of Spain	Madrid, Spain
Win	46–11	(Spain) Rafael Mota	TF 13–0	July 11, 2015	2015 Grand Prix of Spain	Madrid, Spain
2015 US World Team Trials (bronze) at 74 kg
Win	45–11	(United States) Andrew Howe	6–0	June 12–14, 2015	2015 US World Team Trials Challenge	(United States) Madison, Wisconsin
Loss	44–11	(United States) Kyle Dake	2–8	June 12–14, 2015	2015 US World Team Trials Challenge	(United States) Madison, Wisconsin
Win	44–10	(United States) Tyler Caldwell	5–2	June 12–14, 2015	2015 US World Team Trials Challenge	(United States) Madison, Wisconsin
Win	43–10	(Cuba) Liván López	TF 18–7	May 12, 2015	2015 Beat The Streets: Salsa in the Square	(United States) New York City, New York
2015 US Open (gold) at 74 kg
Win	42–10	(United States) Andre Howe	2–0	May 5–9, 2015	2015 US Open National Championships	(United States) Las Vegas, Nevada
Win	41–10	(United States) Tyler Caldwell	TF 12–2	May 5–9, 2015	2015 US Open National Championships	(United States) Las Vegas, Nevada
Win	40–10	(Colombia) Nestor Tafur	TF 10–0	May 5–9, 2015	2015 US Open National Championships	(United States) Las Vegas, Nevada
Win	39–10	(United States) Jacob Butenhoff	Fall	May 5–9, 2015	2015 US Open National Championships	(United States) Las Vegas, Nevada
2015 Grand Prix Yaşar Doğu 5th at 74 kg
Loss	38–10	(Russia) Khetag Tsabolov	3–9	March 28–29, 2015	2015 Grand Prix Yaşar Doğu	Istanbul, Turkey
Loss	38–9	(Russia) Denis Tsargush	3–6	March 28–29, 2015	2015 Grand Prix Yaşar Doğu	Istanbul, Turkey
Win	38–8	(Iran) Bahman Teymouri	Fall	March 28–29, 2015	2015 Grand Prix Yaşar Doğu	Istanbul, Turkey
Win	37–8	(Turkey) Abdullah Arslan	12–4	March 28–29, 2015	2015 Grand Prix Yaşar Doğu	Istanbul, Turkey
Win	36–8	(Georgia (country)) Marad Zoidze	6–5	March 28–29, 2015	2015 Grand Prix Yaşar Doğu	Istanbul, Turkey
2014 US World Team Trials (silver) at 74 kg
Loss	35–8	(United States) Jordan Burroughs	5–6	May 30–31, 2014	2014 US World Team Trials	(United States) Madison, Wisconsin
Loss	35–7	(United States) Jordan Burroughs	2–6	May 30–31, 2014	2014 US World Team Trials	(United States) Madison, Wisconsin
Win	35–6	(United States) Andre Howe	3–1	May 30–31, 2014	2014 US World Team Trials Challenge Tournament	(United States) Madison, Wisconsin
Win	34–6	(United States) Quinton Godley	TF 10–0	May 30–31, 2014	2014 US World Team Trials Challenge Tournament	(United States) Madison, Wisconsin
Win	33–6	(Azerbaijan) Jabrayil Hasanov	6–0	May 7, 2014	2014 Beat The Streets: USA vs. The World	(United States) New York City, New York
2014 US Open (silver) at 74 kg
Loss	32–6	(United States) Jordan Burroughs	6–7	April 16–19, 2014	2014 US Open National Championships	(United States) Las Vegas, Nevada
Win	32–5	(United States) Tyler Caldwell	6–0	April 16–19, 2014	2014 US Open National Championships	(United States) Las Vegas, Nevada
Win	31–5	(United States) Paul Rademacher	Fall	April 16–19, 2014	2014 US Open National Championships	(United States) Las Vegas, Nevada
Win	30–5	(United States) Marcus Bausaman	TF 13–0	April 16–19, 2014	2014 US Open National Championships	(United States) Las Vegas, Nevada
2013 Universidae Games (bronze) at 74 kg
Win	29–5	(Mongolia) Gombodorj Dorjvaanchig	10–3	July 11–16, 2013	2013 Summer Universiade	Kazan, Russia
Win	28–5	(Iran) Reza Afzali Paemami	7–5	July 11–16, 2013	2013 Summer Universiade	Kazan, Russia
Loss	27–5	(Russia) Denis Tsargush	4–7	July 11–16, 2013	2013 Summer Universiade	Kazan, Russia
Win	27–4	(Greece) Apostolos Taskoudis	Fall	July 11–16, 2013	2013 Summer Universiade	Kazan, Russia
Win	26–4	(Georgia (country)) Zurab Erbotsonashvili	8–4	July 11–16, 2013	2013 Summer Universiade	Kazan, Russia
2013 US World Team Trials (bronze) at 74 kg
Win	25–4	(United States) Andrew Howe	TF 9-–	June 20–22, 2013	2013 US World Team Trials Challenge	(United States) Stillwater, Oklahoma
Win	24–4	(United States) Trent Paulson	4–0	June 20–22, 2013	2013 US World Team Trials Challenge	(United States) Stillwater, Oklahoma
Win	23–4	(United States) Ryan Morningstar	4–2	June 20–22, 2013	2013 US World Team Trials Challenge	(United States) Stillwater, Oklahoma
Loss	22–4	(United States) Kyle Dake	4–7	June 20–22, 2013	2013 US World Team Trials Challenge	(United States) Stillwater, Oklahoma
Win	22–3	(United States) Moza Fay	TF 9–1	June 20–22, 2013	2013 US World Team Trials Challenge	(United States) Stillwater, Oklahoma
2013 US University Nationals (gold) at 74 kg
Win	21–3	(United States) Quinton Godley	Fall	May 24–26, 2013	2013 US University National Championships	(United States) Akron, Ohio
Win	20–3	(United States) Quinton Godley	3–0	May 24–26, 2013	2013 US University National Championships	(United States) Akron, Ohio
Win	19–3	(United States) Ian Miller	TF 14–4	May 24–26, 2013	2013 US University National Championships	(United States) Akron, Ohio
Win	18–3	(United States) Logan Molina	Fall	May 24–26, 2013	2013 US University National Championships	(United States) Akron, Ohio
Win	17–3	(United States) Geno Morelli	TF 13–3	May 24–26, 2013	2013 US University National Championships	(United States) Akron, Ohio
Win	16–3	(United States) Jesse Stafford	Fall	May 24–26, 2013	2013 US University National Championships	(United States) Akron, Ohio
Win	15–3	(United States) Robert Schlitt	TF 10–0	May 24–26, 2013	2013 US University National Championships	(United States) Akron, Ohio
Win	14–3	(United States) Santonio Cathery	TF 11–0	May 24–26, 2013	2013 US University National Championships	(United States) Akron, Ohio
Win	13–3	(Russia) Magomed Kurbanaliev	Fall	May 15, 2013	2013 Beat The Streets: Rumble on the Rails	(United States) New York City, New York
2013 US Open (silver) at 74 kg
Loss	12–3	(United States) Jordan Burroughs	1–3, 0–1	April 17–20, 2013	2013 US Open National Championships	(United States) Las Vegas, Nevada
Win	12–2	(United States) Nick Marable	2–0, 4–0	April 17–20, 2013	2013 US Open National Championships	(United States) Las Vegas, Nevada
Win	11–2	(United States) Ryan Morningstar	1–0, 1–0	April 17–20, 2013	2013 US Open National Championships	(United States) Las Vegas, Nevada
Win	10–2	(United States) Holden Packard	TF 9–0, 7–0	April 17–20, 2013	2013 US Open National Championships	(United States) Las Vegas, Nevada
2012 US Olympic Team Trials DNP at 74 kg
Loss	9–2	(United States) Kyle Dake	Fall	April 21, 2012	2012 US Olympic Team Trials	(United States) Iowa City, Iowa
Win	9–1	(United States) Colt Sponseller	2–0, 1–1, 4–2	April 21, 2012	2012 US Olympic Team Trials	(United States) Iowa City, Iowa
Win	8–1	(United States) Mike Poeta	4–3, 3–1	April 21, 2012	2012 US Olympic Team Trials	(United States) Iowa City, Iowa
Loss	7–1	(United States) Andrew Howe	0–1, 0–5	April 21, 2012	2012 US Olympic Team Trials	(United States) Iowa City, Iowa
Win	7–0	(United States) Moza Fay	0–4, 5–3, 3–1	April 21, 2012	2012 US Olympic Team Trials	(United States) Iowa City, Iowa
2010 US University Nationals (gold) at 70 kg
Win	6–0	(United States) Matt Lester	3–0, 5–1	April 8–11, 2010	2010 US University National Championships	(United States) Akron, Ohio
Win	5–0	(United States) Dean Pavlou	TF 7–0, 6–0	April 8–11, 2010	2010 US University National Championships	(United States) Akron, Ohio
Win	4–0	(United States) Seth Vernon	1–0, 4–3	April 8–11, 2010	2010 US University National Championships	(United States) Akron, Ohio
Win	3–0	(United States) Matt Ballweg	2–1, 1–1, 3–1	April 8–11, 2010	2010 US University National Championships	(United States) Akron, Ohio
Win	2–0	(United States) Timmy Boone	2–2, 3–0, 8–2	April 8–11, 2010	2010 US University National Championships	(United States) Akron, Ohio
Win	1–0	(United States) Nathan Millman	TF 7–0, 6–0	April 8–11, 2010	2010 US University National Championships	(United States) Akron, Ohio

== NCAA record ==
NCAA Championships Matches
Res.	Record	Opponent	Score	Date	Event
2014 NCAA Championships (gold) at 165 lbs
Win	18-2	Tyler Caldwell	6-0	March 20–22, 2014	2014 NCAA Division I Wrestling Championships
Win	17-2	Steve Monk	MD 13-5	March 20–22, 2014	2014 NCAA Division I Wrestling Championships
Win	16-2	Michael Moreno	Fall	March 20–22, 2014	2014 NCAA Division I Wrestling Championships
Win	15-2	Jim Wilson	Fall	March 20–22, 2014	2014 NCAA Division I Wrestling Championships
Win	14-2	Joe Brewster	Fall	March 20–22, 2014	2014 NCAA Division I Wrestling Championships
2013 NCAA Championships (silver) at 165 lbs
Loss	13-2	Kyle Dake	4-5	March 21–23, 2013	2013 NCAA Division I Wrestling Championships
Win	13-1	Peter Yates	Fall	March 21–23, 2013	2013 NCAA Division I Wrestling Championships
Win	12-1	Conrad Polz	Fall	March 21–23, 2013	2013 NCAA Division I Wrestling Championships
Win	11-1	Zachary Strickland	Fall	March 21–23, 2013	2013 NCAA Division I Wrestling Championships
Win	10-1	John Staudenmayer	Fall	March 21–23, 2013	2013 NCAA Division I Wrestling Championships
2012 NCAA Championships (gold) at 165 lbs
Win	9-1	Brandon Hatchett	TF 22-7	March 15–17, 2012	2012 NCAA Division I Wrestling Championships
Win	8-1	Bekzod Abdurakhmonov	Fall	March 15–17, 2012	2012 NCAA Division I Wrestling Championships
Win	7-1	Robert Kokesh	Fall	March 15–17, 2012	2012 NCAA Division I Wrestling Championships
Win	6-1	Brandon Wright	Fall	March 15–17, 2012	2012 NCAA Division I Wrestling Championships
Win	5-1	Corey Lear	Fall	March 15–17, 2012	2012 NCAA Division I Wrestling Championships
2011 NCAA Championships (silver) at 157 lbs
Loss	4-1	Bubba Jenkins	Fall	March 17–20, 2011	2011 NCAA Division I Wrestling Championships
Win	4-0	Steven Fittery	7-1	March 17–20, 2011	2011 NCAA Division I Wrestling Championships
Win	3-0	Derek St. John	6-3	March 17–20, 2011	2011 NCAA Division I Wrestling Championships
Win	2-0	David Bonin	TF 20-5	March 17–20, 2011	2011 NCAA Division I Wrestling Championships
Win	1-0	Neil Erisman	MD 13-2	March 17–20, 2011	2011 NCAA Division I Wrestling Championships

== Head coaching record ==
Year by year
Year	Team	Record	Conference	National
2025	Oklahoma State	13-1	1st	3rd
2026	Oklahoma State	15-1	1st	2nd

Overall record
Dual Record	Conference Champions	All-Americans	National Champions
28-2	5	14	5

Record against rivals
Rival	Record
Oklahoma	2-0
Iowa	1-2

== Awards and honors ==
2021

- (gold) Olympic games
- (gold) Pan American Championships

2019

- (gold) Pan American Championships

2018

- UWW Best Wrestler of the Year
- John Smith Award as the Freestyle Wrestler of the Year
- (gold) World Wrestling Championships
- (gold) World Cup Championships
- (gold) Pan American Championships
- (gold) Ivan Yarygin Grand Prix
- (gold) Yasar Dogu

2017

- (gold) World Cup Championships
- (gold) Grand Prix of Paris

2016

- (gold) Grand Prix of Spain

2015

- (gold) Stepan Sargsyan Tournament
- (gold) Grand Prix of Spain

2014

- Dan Hodge Trophy winner
- NCAA Division I Championships Outstanding Wrestler
- (gold) NCAA Division I
- (gold) Big Ten Conference

2013

- (bronze) World University Games
- (silver) NCAA Division I
- (gold) Big Ten Conference

2012

- Dan Hodge Trophy winner
- NCAA Division I Championships Outstanding Wrestler
- (gold) NCAA Division I
- (gold) Big Ten Conference

2011

- (silver) NCAA Division I
- (gold) Big Ten Conference

== Endorsements ==
In 2015, Taylor and Adidas released a line of wrestling apparel labeled "M2" after Taylor's college nickname "Magic Man". Taylor received the nickname after a collegiate match in which he turned an unfavorable situation for himself into an advantage. The apparel line began with wrestling shoes and has since expanded to clothing, posters and Adidas sponsored events.

== See also ==
List of Pennsylvania State University Olympians
