= Trent Hidlay =

American wrestler (born 1999)

Personal information
- Full name: Trent Niemond Hidlay
- Born: April 7, 1999 (age 27) Lewistown, Pennsylvania, U.S.
- Weight: 86 kg (190 lb)

Sport
- Country: United States
- Sport: Wrestling
- Events: Freestyle and Folkstyle
- College team: NC State
- Club: Wolfpack Wrestling Club; Titan Mercury Wrestling Club
- Coached by: Pat Popolizio; Jamill Kelly
Medal record
Men's freestyle wrestling
Representing the United States
World Championships
Gold medal – first place	2025 Zagreb	92 kg
Silver medal – second place	2026 Astana	92 kg
Pan American Championships
Gold medal – first place	2025 Monterrey	92 kg
Gold medal – first place	2026 Coralville	92 kg
Grand Prix
Gold medal – first place	2023 New York City	86 kg
Gold medal – first place	2025 Budapest	92 kg
Silver medal – second place	2024 Budapest	86 kg
Silver medal – second place	2026 Zagreb	92 kg
Bronze medal – third place	2025 Zagreb	86 kg
US National Championships
Gold medal – first place	2025 Las Vegas	92 kg
Silver medal – second place	2021 Coralville	86 kg
Bronze medal – third place	2020 Coralville	86 kg
U23 World Championships
Silver medal – second place	2022 Pontevedra	86 kg
Junior World Championships
Bronze medal – third place	2019 Tallinn	86 kg
Men's collegiate wrestling
Representing the NC State Wolfpack
NCAA Division I Championships
Silver medal – second place	2021 St. Louis	184 lb
Silver medal – second place	2024 Kansas City	197 lb
ACC Championships
Gold medal – first place	2021 Raleigh	184 lb
Gold medal – first place	2022 Charlottesville	184 lb
Gold medal – first place	2023 Raleigh	184 lb
Gold medal – first place	2024 Chapel Hill	197 lb
Silver medal – second place	2020 Pittsburgh	184 lb

Trent Niemond Hidlay (born April 7, 1999) is an American freestyle and graduated folkstyle wrestler who competes at 92 kilograms. As a folkstyle wrestler, he was a five-time NCAA Division I All-American, a four-time ACC Conference champion and a two-time NCAA Division I runner-up. In freestyle, Hidlay was the 2025 World Champion and a two-time Pan American champion.

== Career ==
=== High school ===
Hidlay finished his high school career with a record of 154–14, winning two Pennsylvania Class AAA state titles at Mifflin County High School in Lewistown, Pennsylvania. Hidlay was also a 2017 FloNationals Champion, two-time Powerade Champion in 2016 and 2017, and three-time Super 32 placer. He also placed third at the 2018 UWW Junior World Team Trials at 79 kg and 2017 Junior National Freestyle and Greco-Roman Runner-Up.

=== NC State ===
==== 2019-2020 ====
After redshirting during the 2018–19 season, Hidlay made his college wrestling debut at 184 lb for NC State. Hidlay won ACC Freshman of the year finishing second at the ACC Championships falling to Hunter Bolen of Virginia Tech in the finals 2–1. The NCAA tournament was cancelled due to coronavirus, Hidlay was slated to be the five seed.

==== 2020-2021 ====
During the 2020–21 season Hidlay won his first ACC title, avenging the previous year's final loss with a 3–1 win against Hunter Bolen. Hidlay then capped off his 10–2 season with a runner up finish at the NCAA tournament, losing to Penn State's Aaron Brooks in the finals 3–2.

==== 2021-2022 ====
Hidlay finished the regular season with a perfect record and ultimately finished the season with a 21–2 record, his third ACC title and a fifth-place finish at the NCAA tournament. Hidlay started the tournament strong with three straight wins capped by a 6-2 decision of Oregon State's Trey Munoz. Hidlay then ran into familiar foe Penn State's Aaron Brooks in the semis, falling 6–4 in overtime. Hidlay then lost to Northern Iowa's Parker Kecheisen 7–5 in tiebreakers. Hidlay finished the tournament with a win over Ohio State's Kaleb Romero 3–2 to finish in 5th place.

==== 2022-2023 ====
During the 2022 season, Hiday captured his third ACC title with a 5-0 decision over Hunter Bolen. Hidlay finished in fourth place at the NCAA tournament with losses to rivals Aaron Brooks 6–3 in the semifinals and Kaleb Romero 3–1 in the third place bout. Hidlay finished the season 23–3.

==== 2023-2024 ====
Hidlay wrapped up his final season of college wrestling moving up to 197 lb and finished with a 28–1 record and capturing his fourth ACC title. Hidlay made his second NCAA finals after defeating South Dakota State's Tanner Solan 4–1 in the semi finals. Hidlay finished second after a 6–1 loss to Aaron Brooks in his final match of his college career.

=== Freestyle ===
==== Age Level Freestyle ====
In 2019, Hidlay captured a bronze medal at the World Junior Wrestling Championships at 86 kg. In 2022, Hidlay took silver at the 2022 U23 World Wrestling Championships, falling in the 86 kg finals to Japan's Tatsuya Shirai.

==== 2023 ====
In 2023, Hidlay won the Bill Farrell Memorial International defeating former three-time NCAA champ Alex Dieringer from Oklahoma State in the finals.

==== 2024 ====
Hidlay made the U.S. national team with his third-place performance at the 2024 United States Olympic trials. In 2024, Hidlay took silver at the Polyak & Varga Memorial Ranking Event losing to world champion Hassan Yazdani in the finals.

==== 2025 ====
Hidlay captured a gold medal at the 2025 Zagreb ranking series going 2–1 at 86 kg.

== Folkstyle record ==
Season	Year	School	NCAA	Weight Class	Record	Win
2024	Senior+	North Carolina State University	2nd	197	28-1	96.55%
2023	Junior+	North Carolina State University	4th	184	23-3	88.46%
2022	Sophomore+	North Carolina State University	5th	184	21-2	91.30%
2021	Sophomore	North Carolina State University	2nd	184	10-2	83.33
2020	Freshman	North Carolina State University	Qualified (Cancelled COVID-19)	184	19-4	94.44%
2019	Redshirt	North Carolina State University		174	22-2	91.67%
Career		North Carolina State University			123-14	89.78%

== Freestyle record ==
Senior Freestyle Matches
Res.	Record	Opponent	Score	Date	Event	Location
2026 US World Team Trials (gold) at 92 kg
Win	73-13	(United States) Michael Macchiavello	8-3	June 13, 2026	2026 Final X	(United States) Chantilly, Virginia
Win	72-13	(United States) Michael Macchiavello	2-1	June 13, 2026	2026 Final X	(United States) Chantilly, Virginia
2026 Pan American Championships (gold) at 92 kg
Win	71-13	(Canada) Andrew Johnson	TF 11-0	May 10, 2026	2026 Pan American Wrestling Championships	(United States) Coralville, Iowa
Win	70-13	(Peru) Pool Ambrocio	TF 11-0	May 10, 2026	2026 Pan American Wrestling Championships	(United States) Coralville, Iowa
Win	69-13	(Brazil) Lucas Alvan	TF 11-0	May 10, 2026	2026 Pan American Wrestling Championships	(United States) Coralville, Iowa
Win	68-13	(Puerto Rico) Shane Jones	TF 13-2	May 10, 2026	2026 Pan American Wrestling Championships	(United States) Coralville, Iowa
Win	67-13	(United States) Pat Downey	TF 12-0	March 28, 2026	RAF 07	(United States) Tampa, Florida
2026 Grand Prix Zagreb Open (silver) at 92 kg
Loss		(Iran) Mohammad Mobin Azimi	FF	February 5, 2026	2026 Grand Prix Zagreb Open	Zagreb, Croatia
Win	66-13	(United States) Michael Macchiavello	3-3	February 5, 2026	2026 Grand Prix Zagreb Open	Zagreb, Croatia
Win	65-13	(Iran) Abolfazl Rahmani	12-9	February 5, 2026	2026 Grand Prix Zagreb Open	Zagreb, Croatia
Win	64-13	(Iran) Mohammad Mobin Azimi	5-5	February 5, 2026	2026 Grand Prix Zagreb Open	Zagreb, Croatia
Win	63-13	(United States) Jacob Cardenas	5-3	December 20, 2025	RAF 04	(United States) Fishers, Indiana
2025 World Championships (gold) at 92 kg
Win	62-13	Amanula Gadzhimagomedov	13-10	September 14–15, 2025	2025 World Championships	Zagreb, Croatia
Win	61-13	(Azerbaijan) Osman Nurmagomedov	TF 15–4	September 14–15, 2025	2025 World Championships	Zagreb, Croatia
Win	60-13	(Georgia (country)) Miriani Maisuradze	6-1	September 14–15, 2025	2025 World Championships	Zagreb, Croatia
Win	59-13	(Switzerland) Samuel Scherrer	TF 10–0	September 14–15, 2025	2025 World Championships	Zagreb, Croatia
Win	58-13	(North Macedonia) Redjep Hajdari	TF 11–1	September 14–15, 2025	2025 World Championships	Zagreb, Croatia
2025 Polyák Imre & Varga János Memorial Tournament (gold) 92 kg
Win	57-13	(Georgia (country)) Miriani Maisuradze	7-2	Jul 17–18, 2025	2025 Polyák Imre & Varga János Memorial Tournament	Budapest, Hungary
Win	56-13	(Greece) Dauren Kurugliev	INJ	Jul 17–18, 2025	2025 Polyák Imre & Varga János Memorial Tournament	Budapest, Hungary
Win	55-13	(Hungary) Krisztian Angyal	TF 10–0	Jul 17–18, 2025	2025 Polyák Imre & Varga János Memorial Tournament	Budapest, Hungary
Win	54-13	(Azerbaijan) Abubakr Abakarov	7-2	Jul 17–18, 2025	2025 Polyák Imre & Varga János Memorial Tournament	Budapest, Hungary
2025 US World Team Trials (gold) at 92 kg
Win	53-13	(United States) Josh Barr	3-2	June 14, 2025	2025 Final X	(United States) Newark, New Jersey
Win	52-13	(United States) Josh Barr	6-1	June 14, 2025	2025 Final X	(United States) Newark, New Jersey
2025 Pan American Championships (gold) at 92 kg
Win	51-13	(Mexico) Miguel Lavielle Ramierez	TF 10–0	May 11, 2025	2025 Pan American Championships	Monterrey, Mexico
Win	50-13	(Puerto Rico) Edwin Morales	TF 12–1	May 11, 2025	2025 Pan American Championships	Monterrey, Mexico
Win		(Panama) Eduardo Vega Garcia	FF	May 11, 2025	2025 Pan American Championships	Monterrey, Mexico
Win	49-13	(Canada) Andrew Johnson	TF 11–0	May 11, 2025	2025 Pan American Championships	Monterrey, Mexico
2025 US Open (gold) at 92 kg
Win	48-13	(United States) Aeoden Sinclair	7-1	April 25–26, 2025	2025 US Open National Championships	(United States) Las Vegas, Nevada
Win	47-13	(United States) Eric Schultz	7-4	April 25–26, 2025	2025 US Open National Championships	(United States) Las Vegas, Nevada
Win	46-13	(United States) Kalob Runyan	TF 10–0	April 25–26, 2025	2025 US Open National Championships	(United States) Las Vegas, Nevada
Win	45-13	(United States) Braden Homsey	TF 11–0	April 25–26, 2025	2025 US Open National Championships	(United States) Las Vegas, Nevada
Loss	44-13	(United States) Zahid Valencia	0-5	February 26, 2025	FloWrestling: Night in America – 88 kg	(United States) Coralville, Iowa
2025 Grand Prix Zagreb Open (bronze) at 86 kg
Win	44-12	(Georgia (country)) Tariel Gaphrindashvili	10-4	February 5, 2025	2025 Grand Prix Zagreb Open	Zagreb, Croatia
Loss	43-12	(Azerbaijan) Arsenii Dzhioev	0-5	February 5, 2025	2025 Grand Prix Zagreb Open	Zagreb, Croatia
Win	43-11	(Moldova) Eugeniu Mihalcean	3-2	February 5, 2025	2025 Grand Prix Zagreb Open	Zagreb, Croatia
2024 US Senior World Team Trials (silver) 92 kg
Loss	42-11	(United States) David Taylor	6-10	September 14–15, 2024	2024 US Senior World Team Trials	(United States) Lincoln, Nebraska
Win	42-10	(United States) Jonathan Aiello	TF 12–1	September 14–15, 2024	2024 US Senior World Team Trials	(United States) Lincoln, Nebraska
Win	41-10	(United States) Max Hale	TF 10–0	September 14–15, 2024	2024 US Senior World Team Trials	(United States) Lincoln, Nebraska
Win	40-10	(United States) Eze Chukwuezi	TF 12–2	September 14–15, 2024	2024 US Senior World Team Trials	(United States) Lincoln, Nebraska
2024 Polyák Imre & Varga János Memorial Tournament (silver) 86 kg
Loss	39-10	(Iran) Hassan Yazdani	TF 2–12	June 6, 2024	2024 Polyák Imre & Varga János Memorial Tournament	Budapest, Hungary
Win	39-8	(Georgia (country)) Evsem Shvelidze	TF 13–3	June 6, 2024	2024 Polyák Imre & Varga János Memorial Tournament	Budapest, Hungary
Win	38-8	(Uzbekistan) Bobur Islomov	TF 11–0	June 6, 2024	2024 Polyák Imre & Varga János Memorial Tournament	Budapest, Hungary
2024 US Olympic Trials (bronze) 86 kg
Win		(United States) Zahid Valencia	FF	April 19–20, 2024	2024 US Olympic Trials	(United States) State College, Pennsylvania
Win	37-9	(United States) Alex Dieringer	5-4	April 19–20, 2024	2024 US Olympic Trials	(United States) State College, Pennsylvania
Win	36-9	(United States) Mark Hall	9-4	April 19–20, 2024	2024 US Olympic Trials	(United States) State College, Pennsylvania
Loss	35-9	(United States) Chance Marsteller	2-4	April 19–20, 2024	2024 US Olympic Trials	(United States) State College, Pennsylvania
Win	35-8	(United States) Carter Starocci	6-4	April 19–20, 2024	2024 US Olympic Trials	(United States) State College, Pennsylvania
2023 Bill Farrell Memorial International (gold) at 86 kg
Win	34-8	(United States) Alex Dieringer	2-1	November 17, 2023	2023 Bill Farrell Memorial International	(United States) New York City, New York
Win	33-8	(Georgia (country)) Avtandil Kentchadze	14-10	November 17, 2023	2023 Bill Farrell Memorial International	(United States) New York City, New York
Win	32-8	(United States) Taylor Lujan	4-1	November 17, 2023	2023 Bill Farrell Memorial International	(United States) New York City, New York
Win	31-8	(Canada) Ahmed Shamiya	TF 10–0	November 17, 2023	2023 Bill Farrell Memorial International	(United States) New York City, New York
Win	30-8	(Japan) Taisei Matsuyuki	5-2	November 17, 2023	2023 Bill Farrell Memorial International	(United States) New York City, New York
2023 US Open 4th at 86 kg
Loss	29-8	(United States) Mark Hall	TF 2–13	April 30, 2023	2023 US Open	(United States) Las Vegas, Nevada
Win	29-7	(United States) Dylan Fishback	8-1	April 30, 2023	2023 US Open	(United States) Las Vegas, Nevada
Loss	28-7	(United States) Zahid Valencia	3-8	April 30, 2023	2023 US Open	(United States) Las Vegas, Nevada
Win	28-6	(United States) Andrew Morgan	TF 11–0	April 30, 2023	2023 US Open	(United States) Las Vegas, Nevada
Win	27-6	(United States) Nathan Haas	16-7	April 30, 2023	2023 US Open	(United States) Las Vegas, Nevada
Win	26-6	(United States) Jack Jessen	TF 14–1	April 30, 2023	2023 US Open	(United States) Las Vegas, Nevada
2022 U23 World Championships (silver) at 86 kg
Loss	25-6	(Japan) Tatsuya Shirai	3-3	October 22–23, 2022	2022 U23 World Championships	Pontevedra, Spain
Win	25-5	(Moldova) Ivan Ichizli	TF 11–1	October 22–23, 2022	2022 U23 World Championships	Pontevedra, Spain
Win	24-5	(Kazakhstan) Maksat Satybaldy	6-0	October 22–23, 2022	2022 U23 World Championships	Pontevedra, Spain
Win	23-5	(Kyrgyzstan) Nurtilek Karypbaev	6-0	October 22–23, 2022	2022 U23 World Championships	Pontevedra, Spain
Win	22-5	(Iran) Sajjad Gholami	15-6	October 22–23, 2022	2022 U23 World Championships	Pontevedra, Spain
2022 US Senior World Team Trials Challenge Tournament (bronze) at 86 kg
Loss	21-5	(United States) Mark Hall	4-6	June 8, 2022	2022 Final X	(United States) New York City, New York
Win	21-4	(United States) Drew Foster	6-2	May 21–22, 2022	2022 US Senior World Team Trials Challenge Tournament	(United States) Coralville, Iowa
Win	20-4	(United States) Marcus Coleman	TF 10–0	May 21–22, 2022	2022 US Senior World Team Trials Challenge Tournament	(United States) Coralville, Iowa
Loss	19-4	(United States) Zahid Valencia	4-9	May 21–22, 2022	2022 US Senior World Team Trials Challenge Tournament	(United States) Coralville, Iowa
Win	19-3	(United States) Owen Webster	7-0	May 21–22, 2022	2022 US Senior World Team Trials Challenge Tournament	(United States) Coralville, Iowa
2021 US Senior World Team Trials (bronze) at 92 kg
Win	18-3	(United States) Drew Foster	8-1	September 11–12, 2021	2021 US Senior World Team Trials	(United States) Lincoln, Nebraska
Win	17-3	(United States) Myles Martin	9-5	September 11–12, 2021	2021 US Senior World Team Trials	(United States) Lincoln, Nebraska
Win	16-3	(United States) Scottie Boykin	TF 11–1	September 11–12, 2021	2021 US Senior World Team Trials	(United States) Lincoln, Nebraska
Win	15-3	(United States) Jack Jessen	TF 13–2	September 11–12, 2021	2021 US Senior World Team Trials	(United States) Lincoln, Nebraska
Loss	14-3	(United States) Kollin Moore	4-5	September 11–12, 2021	2021 US Senior World Team Trials	(United States) Lincoln, Nebraska
Win	14-2	(United States) Christopher Smith	TF 10–0	September 11–12, 2021	2021 US Senior World Team Trials	(United States) Lincoln, Nebraska
2021 US Senior Nationals (silver) at 86 kg
Loss	13-2	(United States) Mark Hall	4-5	April 17, 2021	2021 Senior Nationals	(United States) Coralville, Iowa
Win	13-1	(United States) Drew Foster	6-4	April 17, 2021	2021 Senior Nationals	(United States) Coralville, Iowa
Win	12-1	(United States) Calvin Sund	TF 10–0	April 17, 2021	2021 Senior Nationals	(United States) Coralville, Iowa
Win	11-1	(United States) Andrew Morgan	7-4	April 17, 2021	2021 Senior Nationals	(United States) Coralville, Iowa
2020 RTC Cup at 86 kg
Win	10-1	(United States) Drew Foster	12-9	December 4–5, 2020	2020 RTC Cup	(United States) Cincinnati, Ohio
Win	9-1	(San Marino) Myles Amine	4-3	December 4–5, 2020	2020 RTC Cup	(United States) Cincinnati, Ohio
Win	8-1	(United States) Sam Brooks	14-7	December 4–5, 2020	2020 RTC Cup	(United States) Cincinnati, Ohio
Win	7-1	(United States) Brett Pfarr	6-2	December 4–5, 2020	2020 RTC Cup	(United States) Cincinnati, Ohio
Win	6-1	(Lebanon) Domenic Abounader	10-6	December 4–5, 2020	2020 RTC Cup	(United States) Cincinnati, Ohio
2020 US Senior Nationals (bronze) at 86 kg
Win	5-1	(United States) Drew Foster	7-4	October 9–11, 2020	2020 Senior Nationals	(United States) Coralville, Iowa
Win	4-1	(United States) Rocky Elam	8-0	October 9–11, 2020	2020 Senior Nationals	(United States) Coralville, Iowa
Loss	3-1	(United States) Gabe Dean	1-2	October 9–11, 2020	2020 Senior Nationals	(United States) Coralville, Iowa
Win	3-0	(United States) David McFadden	7-6	October 9–11, 2020	2020 Senior Nationals	(United States) Coralville, Iowa
Win	2-0	(United States) Garrett Joles	TF 13–2	October 9–11, 2020	2020 Senior Nationals	(United States) Coralville, Iowa
Win	1-0	(United States) Austin Clayton	TF 11-0	October 9–11, 2020	2020 Senior Nationals	(United States) Coralville, Iowa

== Personal life ==
Trent's brother Hayden, was an NCAA Division I wrestling finalist and a five-time All-American at NC State.
