= Mohamed Saadaoui =

Tunisian freestyle wrestler

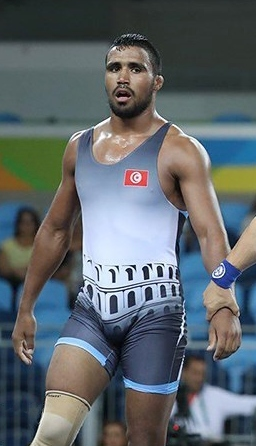
- Saadaoui at the 2016 Olympics

Personal information
- Born: 11 May 1995 (age 31) Tunis, Tunisia
- Height: 176 cm (5 ft 9 in)
- Weight: 86 kg (190 lb)

Sport
- Sport: Freestyle wrestling
Medal record
Representing Tunisia
African Games
Silver medal – second place	2015 Brazzaville	-86 kg
Mediterranean Games
Bronze medal – third place	2022 Oran	97 kg
- Updated on 25 August 2016

Mohamed Saadaoui (Arabic: محمد السعداوي, born 11 May 1995) is a Tunisian freestyle wrestler. He competed in the 86 kg division at the 2016 Summer Olympics, but was eliminated in the first bout. He took up wrestling in 2005.

He qualified at the 2021 African & Oceania Wrestling Olympic Qualification Tournament to represent Tunisia at the 2020 Summer Olympics in Tokyo, Japan.

He won the bronze medal in the 97 kg event at the 2022 Mediterranean Games held in Oran, Algeria.
