= 2022 European Wrestling Championships – Men's freestyle 92 kg =

Wrestling competition

Men's freestyle 92 kg at the 2022 European Wrestling Championships
- Venue: BOK Sports Hall
- Location: Budapest, Hungary
- Dates: 29-30 March
- Competitors: 10

Medalists
gold medal	Feyzullah Aktürk	Turkey
silver medal	Akhmed Bataev	Bulgaria
bronze medal	Osman Nurmagomedov	Azerbaijan
bronze medal	Miriani Maisuradze	Georgia

The men's freestyle 92 kg was a competition featured at the 2022 European Wrestling Championships, and was held in Budapest, Hungary on March 29 and 30.

== Results ==
Legend

- F — Won by fall

=== Main Bracket ===
1/8 finals
Radosław Marcinkiewicz (POL)	10
Simone Iannattoni (ITA)	0
Benjamin Greil (AUT)	1
Feyzullah Aktürk (TUR)	11

Quarterfinals
Osman Nurmagomedov (AZE)	10
Radosław Marcinkiewicz (POL)	0
Damian Iglesias (ESP)	1
Akhmed Bataev (BUL)	7
Miriani Maisuradze (GEO)	10
Hovhannes Mkhitaryan (ARM)	0
Feyzullah Aktürk (TUR)	8
Georgii Rubaev (MDA)	0

Semifinals
Osman Nurmagomedov (AZE)	4
Akhmed Bataev (BUL)	4
Miriani Maisuradze (GEO)	2
Feyzullah Aktürk (TUR)	5

Final
Akhmed Bataev (BUL)	1
Feyzullah Aktürk (TUR)	6

=== Repechage ===
Repechage round 1
Benjamin Greil (AUT)	4
Georgii Rubaev (MDA)	7

Bronze medal match
Damian Iglesias (ESP)	0
Osman Nurmagomedov (AZE)	11
Georgii Rubaev (MDA)	2
Miriani Maisuradze (GEO)	7

== Final standing ==
Rank	Wrestler	UWW Points
1st place, gold medalist(s)	Feyzullah Aktürk (TUR)	10000
2nd place, silver medalist(s)	Akhmed Bataev (BUL)	8000
3rd place, bronze medalist(s)	Osman Nurmagomedov (AZE)	6500
3rd place, bronze medalist(s)	Miriani Maisuradze (GEO)	6500
5	Georgii Rubaev (MDA)	5000
5	Damian Iglesias (ESP)	5000
7	Radosław Marcinkiewicz (POL)	4400
8	Benjamin Greil (AUT)	4000
9	Simone Iannattoni (ITA)	3500
10	Hovhannes Mkhitaryan (ARM)	3100
