= 2023 European Wrestling Championships – Men's freestyle 92 kg =

Wrestling competition

Men's freestyle 92 kg at the 2023 European Wrestling Championships
- Venue: Arena Zagreb
- Location: Zagreb, Croatia
- Dates: 18-19 April
- Competitors: 12

Medalists
gold medal	Feyzullah Aktürk	Turkey
silver medal	Osman Nurmagomedov	Azerbaijan
bronze medal	Miriani Maisuradze	Georgia
bronze medal	Ermak Kardanov	Slovakia

The Men's Freestyle 92 kg is a competition featured at the 2023 European Wrestling Championships, and was held in Zagreb, Croatia on April 18 and 19.

== Results ==
Legend

- F — Won by fall

Round of 16
Adlan Viskhanov (FRA)	10
Strahinja Despić (SRB)	0
Andrian Grosul (MDA)	2
Feyzullah Aktürk (TUR)	5
Joshua Morodion (GER)	0
Ermak Kardanov (SVK)	10
Matt Finesilver (ISR)	5
Redjep Hajdari (MKD)	0

Quarterfinals
Miriani Maisuradze (GEO)	7
Adlan Viskhanov (FRA)	0
Feyzullah Aktürk (TUR)	6
Illia Archaia (UKR)	0
Radosław Marcinkiewicz (POL)	0
Ermak Kardanov (SVK)	3
Matt Finesilver (ISR)	0
Osman Nurmagomedov (AZE)	10

Semifinals
Miriani Maisuradze (GEO)	1
Feyzullah Aktürk (TUR)	11
Ermak Kardanov (SVK)	0
Osman Nurmagomedov (AZE)	6

Final
Feyzullah Aktürk (TUR)	5
Osman Nurmagomedov (AZE)	2

Repechage round 1
Andrian Grosul (MDA)	5
Illia Archaia (UKR)	7

Bronze medal match
Illia Archaia (UKR)	2
Miriani Maisuradze (GEO)	7
Matt Finesilver (ISR)	0
Ermak Kardanov (SVK)	6

== Final standing ==
Rank	Athlete
1st place, gold medalist(s)	Feyzullah Aktürk (TUR)
2nd place, silver medalist(s)	Osman Nurmagomedov (AZE)
3rd place, bronze medalist(s)	Miriani Maisuradze (GEO)
3rd place, bronze medalist(s)	Ermak Kardanov (SVK)
5	Illia Archaia (UKR)
5	Matt Finesilver (ISR)
7	Adlan Viskhanov (FRA)
8	Andrian Grosul (MDA)
9	Radosław Marcinkiewicz (POL)
10	Redjep Hajdari (MKD)
11	Strahinja Despić (SRB)
12	Joshua Morodion (GER)
