= 2019 World Junior Wrestling Championships =

Athletic competition

- Host city: Tallinn, Estonia
- Dates: August 12–18, 2019

Champions
- Freestyle: Russia
- Greco-Roman: Russia
- Women: Japan

The 2019 World Junior Wrestling Championships were the 43rd edition of the World Junior Wrestling Championships and were held in Tallinn, Estonia between 12 and 18 August 2019.

== Medal table ==
Rank	Nation	Gold	Silver	Bronze	Total
1	Japan	10	1	3	14
2	Russia	6	7	8	21
3	Iran	4	1	4	9
4	United States	2	4	4	10
5	Cuba	2	1	0	3
6	Georgia	1	3	0	4
7	Ukraine	1	2	5	8
8	Turkey	1	0	7	8
9	Hungary	1	0	3	4
9	Poland	1	0	3	4
11	India	1	0	2	3
12	Azerbaijan	0	2	4	6
13	Moldova	0	2	2	4
14	Armenia	0	2	0	2
15	China	0	1	3	4
16	Germany	0	1	1	2
16	Kyrgyzstan	0	1	1	2
18	Chinese Taipei	0	1	0	1
18	Mongolia	0	1	0	1
20	Belarus	0	0	3	3
21	Canada	0	0	2	2
21	Kazakhstan	0	0	2	2
23	Bulgaria	0	0	1	1
23	Italy	0	0	1	1
23	Uzbekistan	0	0	1	1
Totals (25 entries)		30	30	60	120

== Team ranking ==
Rank	Men's freestyle		Men's Greco-Roman		Women's freestyle	
Rank	Team	Points	Team	Points	Team	Points
1	Russia	168	Russia	157	Japan	230
2	United States	120	Iran	121	Russia	115
3	Iran	119	Turkey	117	Ukraine	91
4	Japan	84	Georgia	91	Poland	86
5	India	80	Hungary	62	China	85

== Medal summary ==
=== Men's freestyle ===
Event	Gold	Silver	Bronze
57 kg	(Japan) Toshiya Abe	(United States) Vito Arujau	(Kazakhstan) Adlan Askarov
57 kg	(Japan) Toshiya Abe	(United States) Vito Arujau	(Russia) Akhmed Idrisov
61 kg	(Japan) Kaiki Yamaguchi	(Ukraine) Andrii Dzhelep	(United States) Gabriel Tagg
61 kg	(Japan) Kaiki Yamaguchi	(Ukraine) Andrii Dzhelep	(Russia) Alik Khadartsev
65 kg	(Iran) Amir Hossein Maghsoudi	(Russia) Kurban Shiraev	(Azerbaijan) Turan Bayramov
65 kg	(Iran) Amir Hossein Maghsoudi	(Russia) Kurban Shiraev	(Kazakhstan) Syrbaz Talgat
70 kg	(Ukraine) Erik Arushanian	(Moldova) Vasile Diacon	(Iran) Mohammad Sadegh Firouzpour
70 kg	(Ukraine) Erik Arushanian	(Moldova) Vasile Diacon	(Russia) Alan Kudzoev
74 kg	(United States) David Carr	(Japan) Jintaro Motoyama	(Turkey) Abdulvasi Balta
74 kg	(United States) David Carr	(Japan) Jintaro Motoyama	(Azerbaijan) Khadzhimurad Gadzhiyev
79 kg	(Russia) Amkhad Tashukhadzhiev	(Georgia (country)) Bagrati Gagnidze	(Azerbaijan) Abubakr Abakarov
79 kg	(Russia) Amkhad Tashukhadzhiev	(Georgia (country)) Bagrati Gagnidze	(Hungary) Milan Mester
86 kg	(India) Deepak Punia	(Russia) Alik Shebzukhov	(United States) Trent Hidlay
86 kg	(India) Deepak Punia	(Russia) Alik Shebzukhov	(Canada) Hunter Jeffery Lee
92 kg	(Russia) Alan Bagaev	(United States) Lucas Davison	(Germany) Ertugrul Ağca
92 kg	(Russia) Alan Bagaev	(United States) Lucas Davison	(India) Vicky Chahar
97 kg	(Iran) Abbas Foroutan	(Cuba) Yonger Bastida	(Uzbekistan) Makhsud Veysalov
97 kg	(Iran) Abbas Foroutan	(Cuba) Yonger Bastida	(Turkey) Feyzullah Aktürk
125 kg	(United States) Mason Parris	(Iran) Amir Hossein Zare	(Russia) Alen Khubulov
125 kg	(United States) Mason Parris	(Iran) Amir Hossein Zare	(Turkey) Paşa Ekrem Karabulut

=== Men's Greco-Roman ===
Event	Gold	Silver	Bronze
55 kg	(Russia) Anvar Allakhiarov	(Azerbaijan) Zaur Aliyev	(Japan) Ken Matsui
55 kg	(Russia) Anvar Allakhiarov	(Azerbaijan) Zaur Aliyev	(Iran) Pouya Dadmarz
60 kg	(Turkey) Kerem Kamal	(Armenia) Sahak Hovhannisyan	(Russia) Georgii Tibilov
60 kg	(Turkey) Kerem Kamal	(Armenia) Sahak Hovhannisyan	(Azerbaijan) Asgar Alizada
63 kg	(Russia) Abu Muslim Amaev	(Georgia (country)) Leri Abuladze	(Iran) Shahin Bodaghi
63 kg	(Russia) Abu Muslim Amaev	(Georgia (country)) Leri Abuladze	(United States) Alston Nutter
67 kg	(Georgia (country)) Giorgi Shotadze	(Armenia) Shant Khachatryan	(United States) Peyton Omania
67 kg	(Georgia (country)) Giorgi Shotadze	(Armenia) Shant Khachatryan	(Moldova) Valentin Petic
72 kg	(Russia) Sergei Stepanov	(Azerbaijan) Ulvu Ganizade	(Ukraine) Ihor Bychkov
72 kg	(Russia) Sergei Stepanov	(Azerbaijan) Ulvu Ganizade	(Iran) Mohammad Reza Rostami
77 kg	(Iran) Mohammad Naghousi	(Russia) Damir Rakhimov	(Ukraine) Dmytro Vasetskyi
77 kg	(Iran) Mohammad Naghousi	(Russia) Damir Rakhimov	(India) Sajan Bhanwal
82 kg	(Hungary) Istvan Takacs	(Russia) Aues Gonibov	(Belarus) Maksim Bandarenka
82 kg	(Hungary) Istvan Takacs	(Russia) Aues Gonibov	(Turkey) Doğan Kaya
87 kg	(Russia) Ilia Ermolenko	(Georgia (country)) Giorgi Katsanashvili	(Belarus) Ihar Yarashevich
87 kg	(Russia) Ilia Ermolenko	(Georgia (country)) Giorgi Katsanashvili	(Turkey) Bedirhan Tan
97 kg	(Cuba) Gabriel Rosillo	(Germany) Patrick Neumaier	(Turkey) Beytullah Kayışdağ
97 kg	(Cuba) Gabriel Rosillo	(Germany) Patrick Neumaier	(Belarus) Uladzislau Pustashylau
130 kg	(Iran) Ali Akbar Yousefi	(United States) Cohlton Schultz	(Hungary) Dáriusz Vitek
130 kg	(Iran) Ali Akbar Yousefi	(United States) Cohlton Schultz	(Turkey) Hamza Bakır

=== Women's freestyle ===
Event	Gold	Silver	Bronze
50 kg	(Japan) Yui Susaki	(Russia) Daria Khvostova	(Moldova) Maria Leorda
50 kg	(Japan) Yui Susaki	(Russia) Daria Khvostova	(Ukraine) Mariia Vynnyk
53 kg	(Japan) Haruna Okuno	(Mongolia) Nandintsetsegiin Anudari	(Russia) Mariia Tiumerekova
53 kg	(Japan) Haruna Okuno	(Mongolia) Nandintsetsegiin Anudari	(China) Meiduolaji
55 kg	(Poland) Patrycja Gil	(Russia) Ekaterina Verbina	(Bulgaria) Sezen Belberova
55 kg	(Poland) Patrycja Gil	(Russia) Ekaterina Verbina	(Japan) Saki Igarashi
57 kg	(Japan) Akie Hanai	(Ukraine) Alina Hrushyna	(Kyrgyzstan) Nuraida Anarkulova
57 kg	(Japan) Akie Hanai	(Ukraine) Alina Hrushyna	(Poland) Magdalena Głodek
59 kg	(Japan) Sae Nanjo	(Moldova) Anastasia Nichita	(Ukraine) Kateryna Zelenykh
59 kg	(Japan) Sae Nanjo	(Moldova) Anastasia Nichita	(Italy) Morena De Vita
62 kg	(Japan) Yuzuka Inagaki	(China) Wu Yaru	(Russia) Maria Lachugina
62 kg	(Japan) Yuzuka Inagaki	(China) Wu Yaru	(Canada) Ana Godinez
65 kg	(Japan) Miwa Morikawa	(United States) Macey Kilty	(Poland) Wiktoria Chołuj
65 kg	(Japan) Miwa Morikawa	(United States) Macey Kilty	(China) Zhang Yue
68 kg	(Japan) Naruha Matsuyuki	(Kyrgyzstan) Meerim Zhumanazarova	(Poland) Ewelina Ciunek
68 kg	(Japan) Naruha Matsuyuki	(Kyrgyzstan) Meerim Zhumanazarova	(Russia) Khanum Velieva
72 kg	(Japan) Yuka Kagami	(Russia) Evgeniya Zakharchenko	(China) Cheng Shuiyan
72 kg	(Japan) Yuka Kagami	(Russia) Evgeniya Zakharchenko	(Ukraine) Anastasiya Alpyeyeva
76 kg	(Cuba) Milaimys Marín	(Chinese Taipei) Chang Hui-tsz	(Japan) Yasuha Matsuyuki
76 kg	(Cuba) Milaimys Marín	(Chinese Taipei) Chang Hui-tsz	(Hungary) Bernadett Nagy
