= 2022 U23 World Wrestling Championships =

17th edition of the World Wrestling Championships combined events

- Host city: Pontevedra, Spain
- Dates: 17–23 October
- Stadium: Pontevedra Municipal Sports Hall

Champions
- Freestyle: Georgia
- Greco-Roman: Iran
- Women: Japan

The 2022 U23 World Wrestling Championships was the fifth edition of the U23 World Wrestling Championships of combined events and it was held from 17 to 23 October 2022 in Pontevedra, Spain.

== Competition schedule ==
All times are (UTC+2:00)

Date	Time	Event
17 October	10.30-15.00	Qualification rounds: GR – 55-63-77-87-130 kg
17 October	18:00-19.30	Semi-finals: GR – 55-63-77-87-130 kg
18 October	10.30-15.30	Qualification rounds: GR – 60-67-72-82-97 kg; Repechage: GR – 55-63-77-87-130 kg
18 October	16.45-17.45	Semi-finals: GR – 60-67-72-82-97 kg
18 October	18.00-20.30	Finals: GR – 55-63-77-87-130 kg
19 October	10.30-13.30	Qualification rounds: WW – 50-55-59-68-76 kg; Repechage: GR – 60-67-72-82-97 kg
19 October	16.45-17.45	Semi-finals: WW – 50-55-59-68-76 kg
19 October	18.00-21.00	Finals: GR – 60-67-72-82-97 kg
20 October	10.30-13.30	Qualification rounds: WW – 53-57-62-65-72 kg; Repechage: WW – 50-55-59-68-76 kg
20 October	16.45-17.45	Semi-finals: WW – 53-57-62-65-72 kg
20 October	18.00-20.30	Finals: WW – 50-55-59-68-76 kg
21 October	10.30-15.30	Qualification rounds: FS – 57-65-70-79-97 kg; Repechage: WW – 53-57-62-65-72 kg
21 October	16.45-17.45	Semi-finals: FS – 57-65-70-79-97 kg
21 October	18.00-20.30	Finals: WW – 53-57-62-65-72 kg
22 October	10.30-15.30	Qualification rounds: FS – 61-74-86-92-125 kg; Repechage: FS – 57-65-70-79-97 kg
22 October	16.45-17.45	Semi-finals: FS – 61-74-86-92-125 kg
22 October	18.00-21.00	Finals: FS – 57-65-70-79-97 kg
23 October	16.00-17.45	Repechage: FS – 61-74-86-92-125 kg
23 October	18:00-20.30	Finals: FS – 61-74-86-92-125 kg

== Medal table ==
* Host nation (Spain)

Rank	Nation	Gold	Silver	Bronze	Total
1	Japan	8	1	7	16
2	Iran	7	1	3	11
3	Turkey	3	2	6	11
4	Armenia	3	1	2	6
5	Georgia	2	2	4	8
6	Hungary	2	0	1	3
7	United States	1	4	4	9
8	Azerbaijan	1	4	2	7
9	India	1	1	4	6
10	Colombia	1	0	0	1
10	Norway	1	0	0	1
12	Poland	0	3	1	4
13	Ukraine	0	2	9	11
14	Moldova	0	2	3	5
15	Croatia	0	2	0	2
16	Kazakhstan	0	1	3	4
17	France	0	1	1	2
17	Kyrgyzstan	0	1	1	2
19	Austria	0	1	0	1
19	Ecuador	0	1	0	1
21	Canada	0	0	1	1
21	Egypt	0	0	1	1
21	Germany	0	0	1	1
21	Israel	0	0	1	1
21	Italy	0	0	1	1
21	Netherlands	0	0	1	1
21	Sweden	0	0	1	1
21	Tunisia	0	0	1	1
21	Venezuela	0	0	1	1
Totals (29 entries)		30	30	60	120

== Team ranking ==
Rank	Men's freestyle		Men's Greco-Roman		Women's freestyle	
Rank	Team	Points	Team	Points	Team	Points
1	Georgia	141	Iran	138	Japan	225
2	Iran	134	Georgia	101	United States	107
3	United States	112	Turkey	93	Ukraine	107
4	Ukraine	104	Azerbaijan	89	Turkey	93
5	Turkey	95	Japan	89	Poland	74
6	Kazakhstan	92	Armenia	70	Colombia	43
7	Armenia	85	Hungary	67	Moldova	43
8	Japan	72	Ukraine	58	Kazakhstan	40
9	Azerbaijan	60	Croatia	46	India	35
10	Kyrgyzstan	55	India	45	Germany	35

== Medal summary ==
=== Men's freestyle ===
Event	Gold	Silver	Bronze
57 kg	Aman Sehrawat; India	Ahmet Duman; Turkey	Kamil Kerymov; Ukraine
57 kg	Aman Sehrawat; India	Ahmet Duman; Turkey	Bekzat Almaz Uulu; Kyrgyzstan
61 kg	Arsen Harutyunyan; Armenia	Taiyrbek Zhumashbek Uulu; Kyrgyzstan	Assyl Aitakyn; Kazakhstan
61 kg	Arsen Harutyunyan; Armenia	Taiyrbek Zhumashbek Uulu; Kyrgyzstan	Emrah Ormanoğlu; Turkey
65 kg	Vazgen Tevanyan; Armenia	Hamza Alaca; Turkey	Erik Arushanian; Ukraine
65 kg	Vazgen Tevanyan; Armenia	Hamza Alaca; Turkey	Ryoma Anraku; Japan
70 kg	Giorgi Elbakidze; Georgia	Amir Mohammad Yazdani; Iran	Kota Takahashi; Japan
70 kg	Giorgi Elbakidze; Georgia	Amir Mohammad Yazdani; Iran	Kanan Heybatov; Azerbaijan
74 kg	Mohammad Sadegh Firouzpour; Iran	Khadzhimurad Gadzhiyev; Azerbaijan	Vadym Kurylenko; Ukraine
74 kg	Mohammad Sadegh Firouzpour; Iran	Khadzhimurad Gadzhiyev; Azerbaijan	Vasile Diacon; Moldova
79 kg	Vladimeri Gamkrelidze; Georgia	Daulet Yergesh; Kazakhstan	Arman Avagyan; Armenia
79 kg	Vladimeri Gamkrelidze; Georgia	Daulet Yergesh; Kazakhstan	Carter Starocci; United States
86 kg	Tatsuya Shirai; Japan	Trent Hidlay; United States	Ivan Ichizli; Moldova
86 kg	Tatsuya Shirai; Japan	Trent Hidlay; United States	Emre Çiftçi; Turkey
92 kg	Amir Hossein Firouzpour; Iran	Jacob Cardenas; United States	Miriani Maisuradze; Georgia
92 kg	Amir Hossein Firouzpour; Iran	Jacob Cardenas; United States	Feyzullah Aktürk; Turkey
97 kg	Amir Ali Azarpira; Iran	Tanner Sloan; United States	Islam Ilyasov; Azerbaijan
97 kg	Amir Ali Azarpira; Iran	Tanner Sloan; United States	Vasyl Sova; Ukraine
125 kg	Amir Reza Masoumi; Iran	Solomon Manashvili; Georgia	Alisher Yergali; Kazakhstan
125 kg	Amir Reza Masoumi; Iran	Solomon Manashvili; Georgia	Anthony Cassioppi; United States

=== Men's Greco-Roman ===
Event	Gold	Silver	Bronze
55 kg	Pouya Dadmarz; Iran	Nihad Guluzade; Azerbaijan	Ahmet Taşkınoğlu; Turkey
55 kg	Pouya Dadmarz; Iran	Nihad Guluzade; Azerbaijan	Giorgi Tokhadze; Georgia
60 kg	Kerem Kamal; Turkey	Nihat Mammadli; Azerbaijan	Olzhas Sultan; Kazakhstan
60 kg	Kerem Kamal; Turkey	Nihat Mammadli; Azerbaijan	Melkamu Fetene; Israel
63 kg	Iman Mohammadi; Iran	Giorgi Shotadze; Georgia	Ryuto Ikeda; Japan
63 kg	Iman Mohammadi; Iran	Giorgi Shotadze; Georgia	Hrachya Poghosyan; Armenia
67 kg	Danial Sohrabi; Iran	Gagik Snjoyan; France	Diego Chkhikvadze; Georgia
67 kg	Danial Sohrabi; Iran	Gagik Snjoyan; France	Kyotaro Sogabe; Japan
72 kg	Gurban Gurbanov; Azerbaijan	Pavel Puklavec; Croatia	Vikas Dalal; India
72 kg	Gurban Gurbanov; Azerbaijan	Pavel Puklavec; Croatia	Amir Abdi; Iran
77 kg	Malkhas Amoyan; Armenia	Alexandrin Guțu; Moldova	Sajan Bhanwal; India
77 kg	Malkhas Amoyan; Armenia	Alexandrin Guțu; Moldova	Nao Kusaka; Japan
82 kg	Exauce Mukubu; Norway	Karlo Kodrić; Croatia	Lukas Ahlgren; Sweden
82 kg	Exauce Mukubu; Norway	Karlo Kodrić; Croatia	Beka Guruli; Georgia
87 kg	István Takács; Hungary	Gevorg Tadevosyan; Armenia	Szymon Szymonowicz; Poland
87 kg	István Takács; Hungary	Gevorg Tadevosyan; Armenia	Marcel Sterkenburg; Netherlands
97 kg	Alex Szőke; Hungary	Markus Ragginger; Austria	Ali Abedi; Iran
97 kg	Alex Szőke; Hungary	Markus Ragginger; Austria	Nitesh Siwach; India
130 kg	Fatih Bozkurt; Turkey	Mykhailo Vyshnyvetskyi; Ukraine	Dáriusz Vitek; Hungary
130 kg	Fatih Bozkurt; Turkey	Mykhailo Vyshnyvetskyi; Ukraine	Ali Akbar Yousefi; Iran

=== Women's freestyle ===
Event	Gold	Silver	Bronze
50 kg	Yui Susaki; Japan	Ankush Panghal; India	Nada Medani; Egypt
50 kg	Yui Susaki; Japan	Ankush Panghal; India	Sarra Hamdi; Tunisia
53 kg	Haruna Okuno; Japan	Lucía Yépez; Ecuador	Anastasia Blayvas; Germany
53 kg	Haruna Okuno; Japan	Lucía Yépez; Ecuador	Zeynep Yetgil; Turkey
55 kg	Moe Kiyooka; Japan	Mihaela Samoil; Moldova	Alisha Howk; United States
55 kg	Moe Kiyooka; Japan	Mihaela Samoil; Moldova	Elvira Kamaloğlu; Turkey
57 kg	Sae Nanjo; Japan	Patrycja Gil; Poland	Alina Hrushyna; Ukraine
57 kg	Sae Nanjo; Japan	Patrycja Gil; Poland	Alexandra Hedrick; United States
59 kg	Himeka Tokuhara; Japan	Magdalena Głodek; Poland	Solomiia Vynnyk; Ukraine
59 kg	Himeka Tokuhara; Japan	Magdalena Głodek; Poland	Mansi Ahlawat; India
62 kg	Nonoka Ozaki; Japan	Iryna Bondar; Ukraine	Ana Godinez; Canada
62 kg	Nonoka Ozaki; Japan	Iryna Bondar; Ukraine	Astrid Montero; Venezuela
65 kg	Miwa Morikawa; Japan	Nigar Mirzazada; Azerbaijan	Kateryna Zelenykh; Ukraine
65 kg	Miwa Morikawa; Japan	Nigar Mirzazada; Azerbaijan	Elena Esposito; Italy
68 kg	Nesrin Baş; Turkey	Naruha Matsuyuki; Japan	Irina Rîngaci; Moldova
68 kg	Nesrin Baş; Turkey	Naruha Matsuyuki; Japan	Manola Skobelska; Ukraine
72 kg	Amit Elor; United States	Wiktoria Chołuj; Poland	Kendra Dacher; France
72 kg	Amit Elor; United States	Wiktoria Chołuj; Poland	Sumire Niikura; Japan
76 kg	Tatiana Rentería; Colombia	Dymond Guilford; United States	Anastasiya Alpyeyeva; Ukraine
76 kg	Tatiana Rentería; Colombia	Dymond Guilford; United States	Yasuha Matsuyuki; Japan

== Participating nations ==
551 wrestlers from 56 countries:

1. Angola (3)
2. Armenia (17)
3. Australia (1)
4. Austria (3)
5. Azerbaijan (19)
6. Belgium (1)
7. Brazil (2)
8. Bulgaria (12)
9. Canada (19)
10. Chile (2)
11. Colombia (9)
12. Croatia (4)
13. Czech Republic (1)
14. Ecuador (1)
15. Egypt (5)
16. Spain (24) (Host)
17. Estonia (6)
18. Finland (5)
19. France (13)
20. United Kingdom (1)
21. Georgia (20)
22. Germany (17)
23. Greece (11)
24. Guatemala (2)
25. Hungary (17)
26. India (10)
27. Iran (20)
28. Israel (7)
29. Italy (6)
30. Japan (30)
31. Kazakhstan (30)
32. Kyrgyzstan (15)
33. Latvia (4)
34. Lithuania (4)
35. Moldova (17)
36. Mexico (10)
37. Mongolia (1)
38. Netherlands (2)
39. Norway (4)
40. Philippines (3)
41. Poland (17)
42. Puerto Rico (8)
43. Romania (8)
44. South Africa (2)
45. Serbia (3)
46. Sri Lanka (8)
47. Switzerland (7)
48. Slovakia (1)
49. Sweden (5)
50. Turkmenistan (9)
51. Chinese Taipei (5)
52. Tunisia (3)
53. Turkey (30)
54. Ukraine (30)
55. United States (30)
56. Venezuela (6)
