= 2024 European Wrestling Championships – Men's freestyle 92 kg =

Wrestling competition

Men's freestyle 92 kg at the 2024 European Wrestling Championships
- Venue: Polyvalent Hall
- Location: Bucharest, Romania
- Dates: 17-18 February
- Competitors: 17

Medalists
gold medal	Feyzullah Aktürk	Turkey
silver medal	Boris Makoev	Slovakia
bronze medal	Magomed Kurbanov	Individual Neutral Athletes
bronze medal	Miriani Maisuradze	Georgia

The men's freestyle 92 kg is a competition featured at the 2024 European Wrestling Championships, and was held in Bucharest, Romania on February 17 and 18.

== Results ==
Legend

- F — Won by fall

=== Final ===
Final
Boris Makoev (SVK)	0
Feyzullah Aktürk (TUR)	8

=== Top half ===
Round of 32
Yaraslau Iadkouski (AIN)	10
Zoltan Szep (ROU)	7

Round of 16
Osman Nurmagomedov (AZE)	1
Magomed Kurbanov (AIN)	5
Yaraslau Iadkouski (AIN)	1
Knyaz Iboyan (ARM)	2
Redjep Hajdari (MKD)	7
Balázs Juhász (HUN)	6
Boris Makoev (SVK)	12
Denys Sahaliuk (UKR)	1

Quarterfinals
Magomed Kurbanov (AIN)	9
Knyaz Iboyan (ARM)	0
Redjep Hajdari (MKD)	4
Boris Makoev (SVK)	8

Semifinals
Magomed Kurbanov (AIN)	1
Boris Makoev (SVK)	2

=== Bottom half ===
Round of 32

Round of 16
Miriani Maisuradze (GEO)	10
Ivars Samušonoks (LAT)	2
Joshua Morodion (GER)	3
Akhmed Magamaev (BUL)	6
Uri Kalashnikov (ISR)	2
Andrian Grosul (MDA)	7
Michał Bielawski (POL)	0
Feyzullah Aktürk (TUR)	10

Quarterfinals
Miriani Maisuradze (GEO)	7
Akhmed Magamaev (BUL)	4
Andrian Grosul (MDA)	1
Feyzullah Aktürk (TUR)	8

Semifinals
Miriani Maisuradze (GEO)	0
Feyzullah Aktürk (TUR)	8

=== Repechage ===
Repechage round 2
Denys Sahaliuk (UKR)	7
Redjep Hajdari (MKD)	2
Michał Bielawski (POL)	4
Andrian Grosul (MDA)	6^{F}

Bronze medal match
Denys Sahaliuk (UKR)	0
Magomed Kurbanov (AIN)	8^{F}
Andrian Grosul (MDA)	0
Miriani Maisuradze (GEO)	7

== Final standing ==
Rank	Athlete
1st place, gold medalist(s)	Feyzullah Aktürk (TUR)
2nd place, silver medalist(s)	Boris Makoev (SVK)
3rd place, bronze medalist(s)	Magomed Kurbanov (AIN)
3rd place, bronze medalist(s)	Miriani Maisuradze (GEO)
5	Denys Sahaliuk (UKR)
5	Andrian Grosul (MDA)
7	Redjep Hajdari (MKD)
8	Yaraslau Iadkouski (AIN)
9	Akhmed Magamaev (BUL)
10	Knyaz Iboyan (ARM)
11	Zoltan Szep (ROU)
12	Balázs Juhász (HUN)
13	Joshua Morodion (GER)
14	Uri Kalashnikov (ISR)
15	Ivars Samušonoks (LAT)
16	Osman Nurmagomedov (AZE)
17	Michał Bielawski (POL)
