= Wrestling at the 2022 Mediterranean Games – Men's freestyle 97 kg =

Men's Freestyle 97 kg at the 2022 Mediterranean Games
- Venue: EMEC Hall
- Date: 27–28 June
- Competitors: 7 from 7 nations

Medalists
gold medal	Magomedgaji Nurov	North Macedonia
silver medal	Feyzullah Aktürk	Turkey
bronze medal	Mohamed Saadaoui	Tunisia

The men's freestyle 97 kg competition of the wrestling events at the 2022 Mediterranean Games in Oran, Algeria, was held from 27 June to 28 June at the EMEC Hall.

== Results ==
27 June

=== Elimination groups ===
==== Group A ====
Pos	Athlete	Pld	W	L	CP	TP
1	Magomedgaji Nurov (MKD)	3	3	0	13	33
2	Mohamed Saadaoui (TUN)	3	2	1	7	13
3	Alejandro Cañada (ESP)	3	1	2	4	6
4	Mohammed Fardj (ALG)	3	0	3	1	3

Source: Oran 2022

	Score		CP
Magomedgaji Nurov (MKD)	13–2	Mohamed Saadaoui (TUN)	4–1 VSU1
Mohammed Fardj (ALG)	0–4	Alejandro Cañada (ESP)	0–3 VPO
Magomedgaji Nurov (MKD)	10–0 Fall	Mohammed Fardj (ALG)	5–0 VFA
Mohamed Saadaoui (TUN)	6–2	Alejandro Cañada (ESP)	3–1 VPO1
Alejandro Cañada (ESP)	0–10	Magomedgaji Nurov (MKD)	0–4 VSU
Mohamed Saadaoui (TUN)	5–3	Mohammed Fardj (ALG)	3–1 VPO1

==== Group B ====
Pos	Athlete	Pld	W	L	CP	TP
1	Feyzullah Aktürk (TUR)	2	2	0	7	17
2	Mostafa El-Ders (EGY)	2	1	1	3	4
3	Simone Iannattoni (ITA)	2	0	2	0	0

Source: Oran 2022

	Score		CP
Simone Iannattoni (ITA)	0–10	Feyzullah Aktürk (TUR)	0–4 VSU
Mostafa El-Ders (EGY)	4–0	Simone Iannattoni (ITA)	3–0 VPO
Feyzullah Aktürk (TUR)	7–0	Mostafa El-Ders (EGY)	3–0 VPO

Semifinals
Magomedgaji Nurov (MKD)	6
Mostafa El-Ders (EGY)	1
Mohamed Saadaoui (TUN)	2
Feyzullah Aktürk (TUR)	10

Final
Magomedgaji Nurov (MKD)	4
Feyzullah Aktürk (TUR)	3
Bronze medal
Mostafa El-Ders (EGY)	8
Mohamed Saadaoui (TUN)	12
