= 2023 World Wrestling Championships – Men's freestyle 92 kg =

Wrestling competitions

Men's freestyle 92 kg at the 2023 World Championships
- Venue: Štark Arena
- Dates: 17–18 September 2023
- Competitors: 24 from 21 nations

Medalists
gold medal	Rizabek Aitmukhan	Kazakhstan
silver medal	Osman Nurmagomedov	Azerbaijan
bronze medal	Feyzullah Aktürk	Turkey
bronze medal	Zahid Valencia	United States

The men's freestyle 92 kilograms is a competition featured at the 2023 World Wrestling Championships, and was held in Belgrade, Serbia on 17 and 18 September 2023.

This freestyle wrestling competition consists of a single-elimination tournament, with a repechage used to determine the winner of two bronze medals. The two finalists face off for gold and silver medals. Each wrestler who loses to one of the two finalists moves into the repechage, culminating in a pair of bronze medal matches featuring the semifinal losers each facing the remaining repechage opponent from their half of the bracket.

== Results ==
Legend

- F — Won by fall
- WO — Won by walkover

=== Final ===
Final
Rizabek Aitmukhan (KAZ)	5
Osman Nurmagomedov (AZE)	2

=== Top half ===
Round of 32
Rustam Shodiev (UZB)	10
Michał Bielawski (POL)	2
Pruthviraj Patil (UWW)	6
Ion Demian (MDA)	4
Balázs Juhász (HUN)	4
Sun Xiao (CHN)	4
Akhmed Magamaev (BUL)	5
Arturo Silot (CUB)	2

Round of 16
Miriani Maisuradze (GEO)	10
Rustam Shodiev (UZB)	0
Pruthviraj Patil (UWW)	6
Ermak Kardanov (SVK)	1
Rizabek Aitmukhan (KAZ)	13
Balázs Juhász (HUN)	3
Akhmed Magamaev (BUL)
Feyzullah Aktürk (TUR)	WO

Quarterfinals
Miriani Maisuradze (GEO)	3^{F}
Pruthviraj Patil (UWW)	0
Rizabek Aitmukhan (KAZ)	11
Feyzullah Aktürk (TUR)	0

Semifinals
Miriani Maisuradze (GEO)	1
Rizabek Aitmukhan (KAZ)	8

=== Bottom half ===
Round of 32
Uri Kalashnikov (ISR)	0
Hajy Rajabau (AIN)	5
Dan Cheptai (KEN)	0
Vladislav Valiev (AIN)	10
Jang Woo-min (KOR)	0
Amir Ali Azarpira (IRI)	11
Tejvir Boal (CAN)	2
Denys Sahaliuk (UKR)	12

Round of 16
Ganbaataryn Gankhuyag (MGL)	7
Hajy Rajabau (AIN)	0
Vladislav Valiev (AIN)	0
Arash Yoshida (JPN)	7
Zahid Valencia (USA)	12
Amir Ali Azarpira (IRI)	9
Denys Sahaliuk (UKR)	0
Osman Nurmagomedov (AZE)	10

Quarterfinals
Ganbaataryn Gankhuyag (MGL)	1
Arash Yoshida (JPN)	11
Zahid Valencia (USA)	1
Osman Nurmagomedov (AZE)	5

Semifinals
Arash Yoshida (JPN)	0
Osman Nurmagomedov (AZE)	10

=== Repechage ===
Repechage round 2
Balázs Juhász (HUN)	0
Feyzullah Aktürk (TUR)	10
Denys Sahaliuk (UKR)	0
Zahid Valencia (USA)	6

Bronze medals
Feyzullah Aktürk (TUR)	5
Miriani Maisuradze (GEO)	3
Zahid Valencia (USA)	11
Arash Yoshida (JPN)	0

== Final standing ==
Rank	Athlete
1st place, gold medalist(s)	Rizabek Aitmukhan (KAZ)
2nd place, silver medalist(s)	Osman Nurmagomedov (AZE)
3rd place, bronze medalist(s)	Feyzullah Aktürk (TUR)
3rd place, bronze medalist(s)	Zahid Valencia (USA)
5	Miriani Maisuradze (GEO)
5	Arash Yoshida (JPN)
7	Pruthviraj Patil (UWW)
8	Amir Ali Azarpira (IRI)
9	Denys Sahaliuk (UKR)
10	Vladislav Valiev (AIN)
11	Ganbaataryn Gankhuyag (MGL)
12	Balázs Juhász (HUN)
13	Rustam Shodiev (UZB)
14	Akhmed Magamaev (BUL)
15	Hajy Rajabau (AIN)
16	Sun Xiao (CHN)
17	Ion Demian (MDA)
18	Arturo Silot (CUB)
19	Michał Bielawski (POL)
20	Tejvir Boal (CAN)
21	Ermak Kardanov (SVK)
22	Uri Kalashnikov (ISR)
23	Dan Cheptai (KEN)
24	Jang Woo-min (KOR)
