= 2026 European Wrestling Championships – Men's freestyle 92 kg =

Wrestling competition

Men's freestyle 92 kg at the 2026 European Wrestling Championships
- Venue: Tirana Olympic Park
- Location: Tirana, Albania
- Dates: 25-26 April
- Competitors: 13

Medalists
| gold medal | Ali Tcokaev | Azerbaijan |
| silver medal | Akhmed Bataev | Bulgaria |
| bronze medal | Amanula Gadzhimagomedov |
| bronze medal | Mirian Maisuradze | Georgia |

The men's freestyle 92 kg is a competition featured at the 2026 European Wrestling Championships, and was held in Tirana, Albania on April 25 and 26.

== Results ==
Legend

- F — Won by fall
- R — Retired

=== Main bracket ===
Round of 16
Şamhan Jabrailov (MDA) | 4
Mukhammed Aliiev (UKR) | 10
Fatih Altunbaş (TUR) | 10
Igor Szucki (POL) | 5
Mushegh Mkrtchyan (ARM) | 1
Akhmed Bataev (BUL) | 4
Albin Peposhi (ALB) | 0
Shaqir Bislimi (KOS) | 10
Yaraslau Iadkouski (UWW) | 0
Ali Tcokaev (AZE) | 10

Quarterfinals
Amanula Gadzhimagomedov (UWW) | 13
Mukhammed Aliiev (UKR) | 2
Fatih Altunbaş (TUR) | 3
Akhmed Bataev (BUL) | 6
Samuel Scherrer (SUI) | 12
Shaqir Bislimi (KOS) | 2
Ali Tcokaev (AZE) | 5
Mirian Maisuradze (GEO) | 0

Semifinals
Amanula Gadzhimagomedov (UWW) | 2
Akhmed Bataev (BUL) | 3
Samuel Scherrer (SUI) | 0
Ali Tcokaev (AZE) | 6

Final
Akhmed Bataev (BUL) | 3
Ali Tcokaev (AZE) | 5

=== Repechage ===
Repechage round 1
Mushegh Mkrtchyan (ARM) | 0^{R}
Fatih Altunbaş (TUR) | 9
Yaraslau Iadkouski (UWW) | 0
Mirian Maisuradze (GEO) | 5

Bronze medal matches
Fatih Altunbaş (TUR) | 4
Amanula Gadzhimagomedov (UWW) | 7
Mirian Maisuradze (GEO) | 4
Samuel Scherrer (SUI) | 0

== Final standing ==
| Rank | Athlete |
|---|---|
| 1st place, gold medalist(s) | Ali Tcokaev (AZE) |
| 2nd place, silver medalist(s) | Akhmed Bataev (BUL) |
| 3rd place, bronze medalist(s) | Amanula Gadzhimagomedov (UWW) |
| 3rd place, bronze medalist(s) | Mirian Maisuradze (GEO) |
| 5 | Fatih Altunbaş (TUR) |
| 5 | Samuel Scherrer (SUI) |
| 7 | Shaqir Bislimi (KOS) |
| 8 | Mukhammed Aliiev (UKR) |
| 9 | Igor Szucki (POL) |
| 10 | Şamhan Jabrailov (MDA) |
| 11 | Mushegh Mkrtchyan (ARM) |
| 12 | Albin Peposhi (ALB) |
| 13 | Yaraslau Iadkouski (UWW) |
