= Mirian Maisuradze =

Georgian freestyle wrestler

Personal information
- Nationality: Georgia
- Born: მირიან მაისურაძე 7 December 1999 (age 26) Oni, Georgia
- Height: 180 cm (5 ft 11 in)

Sport
- Country: Georgia
- Sport: Amateur wrestling
- Weight class: 92 kg
- Event: Freestyle

Achievements and titles
- World finals: (silver) (2024)
- Regional finals: (bronze) (2022, 2024)
Medal record
Men's freestyle wrestling
Representing Georgia
World Championships
Silver medal – second place	2024 Tirana	92 kg
Bronze medal – third place	2022 Belgrade	92 kg
Bronze medal – third place	2026 Astana	92 kg
European Championships
Bronze medal – third place	2022 Budapest	92 kg
Bronze medal – third place	2023 Zagreb	92 kg
Bronze medal – third place	2024 Bucharest	92 kg
Bronze medal – third place	2025 Bratislava	92 kg
Bronze medal – third place	2026 Tirana	92 kg
Dan Kolov & Nikola Petrov Tournament
Gold medal – first place	2021 Plovdiv	92 kg
Grand Prix
Gold medal – first place	2024 Budapest	92 kg
Silver medal – second place	2022 Rome	92 kg
Silver medal – second place	2023 Zagreb	92 kg
Silver medal – second place	2025 Budapest	92 kg
Silver medal – second place	2026 Tirana	92 kg
World U23 Championships
Bronze medal – third place	2022 Pontevedra	92 kg
European Juniors Championships
Gold medal – first place	2019 Pontevedra	86 kg
World Cadets Championships
Gold medal – first place	2016 Tbilisi	76 kg

Mirian Maisuradze (born 7 December 1999) is a Georgian freestyle wrestler. He won one of the bronze medals in the men's 92 kg event at the 2022 World Wrestling Championships held in Belgrade, Serbia. He also won one of the bronze medals in the men's 92 kg event at the 2022 European Wrestling Championships held in Budapest, Hungary.

He won the gold medal in the men's 92 kg at the 2021 Dan Kolov & Nikola Petrov Tournament held in Plovdiv, Bulgaria. In 2022, he competed at the Yasar Dogu Tournament held in Istanbul, Turkey. He won the silver medal in his event at the Matteo Pellicone Ranking Series 2022 held in Rome, Italy.

He won one of the bronze medals in the men's 92 kg event at the 2024 European Wrestling Championships held in Bucharest, Romania.

== Achievements ==
Year	Tournament	Location	Result	Event
2022	European Championships	Budapest, Hungary	3rd	Freestyle 92 kg
2022	World Championships	Belgrade, Serbia	3rd	Freestyle 92 kg
2024	European Championships	Bucharest, Romania	3rd	Freestyle 92 kg
2024	World Championships	Tirana, Albania	2nd	Freestyle 92 kg
2025	European Championships	Bratislava, Slovakia	3rd	Freestyle 92 kg
