= Akhmed Bataev =

Bulgarian freestyle wrestler

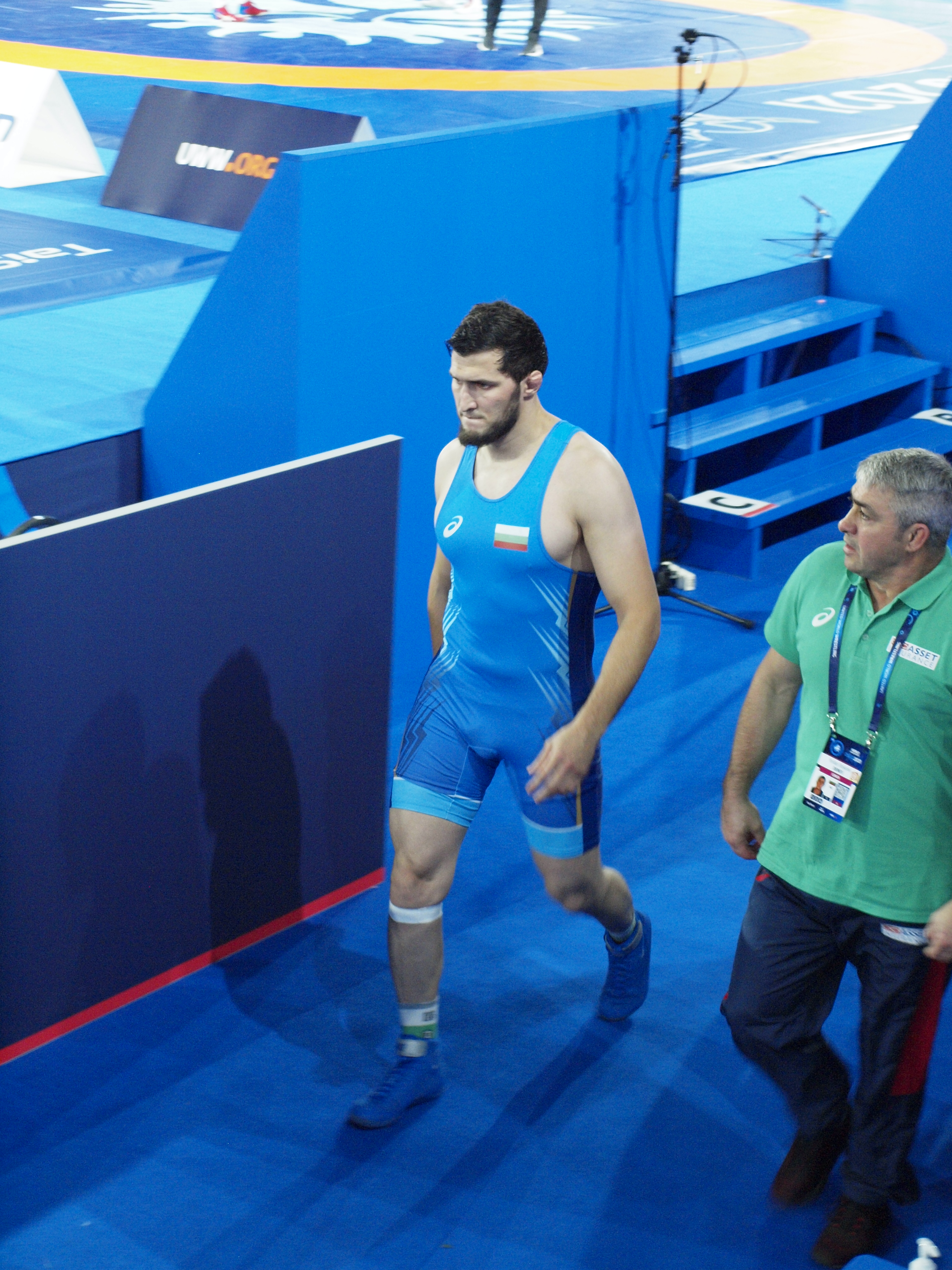
- Bataev at the 2021 World Wrestling Championships in Oslo, Norway

Personal information
- Full name: Ahmed Sultanovich Bataev
- Born: Ахмед Султанович Батаев; 23 September 1991 (age 35) Khasavyurt, Russia
- Height: 1.78 m (5 ft 10 in)

Sport
- Country: Russia (2013–2019); Bulgaria (2020–present)
- Sport: Amateur wrestling
- Weight class: 92 kg
- Event: Freestyle
Medal record
Men's freestyle wrestling
Representing Bulgaria
European Championships
Silver medal – second place	2022 Budapest	92 kg
Silver medal – second place	2026 Tirana	92 kg
Individual World Cup
Bronze medal – third place	2020 Belgrade	97 kg
Dan Kolov & Nikola Petrov Tournament
Silver medal – second place	2023 Sofia	92 kg
Silver medal – second place	2022 Veliko Tarnovo	92 kg
Yasar Dogu Tournament
Poland Open (Wacław Ziółkowski Memorial)
Bronze medal – third place	2023 Warsaw	97 kg

Akhmed Bataev (Russian: Ахмед Султанович Батаев; born 23 September 1991) is a Russian-born Bulgarian wrestler. He won the silver medal in the 92 kg event at the 2022 European Wrestling Championships held in Budapest, Hungary.

== Career ==
Early in his career, he represented Russia and he switched to represent Bulgaria in 2020.

In 2020, he won one of the bronze medals in the men's 97 kg event at the Individual Wrestling World Cup held in Belgrade, Serbia.

In March 2021, he competed at the European Qualification Tournament in Budapest, Hungary hoping to qualify for the 2020 Summer Olympics in Tokyo, Japan. In May 2021, he failed to qualify for the Olympics at the World Qualification Tournament held in Sofia, Bulgaria. He competed in the 97 kg event at the 2021 World Wrestling Championships held in Oslo, Norway.

He competed in the 92 kg event at the 2022 World Wrestling Championships held in Belgrade, Serbia.

== Achievements ==
Year	Tournament	Location	Result	Event
2022	European Championships	Budapest, Hungary	2nd	Freestyle 92 kg
