= Alikhan Zhabrailov =

Russian freestyle wrestler

Personal information
- Full name: Alikhan Lukmanovich Zhabrailov
- Nationality: Russia
- Born: Алихан Лукманович Жабраилов; 14 September 1994 (age 31) Makhachkala, Dagestan, Russia

Sport
- Country: Russia
- Sport: Amateur wrestling
- Weight class: 97 kg
- Event: Freestyle
- Club: Dynamo Wrestling Club
- Coached by: Lukman Zhabrailov; Imanmurza Aliev
Medal record
Men's freestyle wrestling
Representing Russia
World Championships
Bronze medal – third place	2019 Nur-Sultan	92 kg
Individual World Cup
Gold medal – first place	2020 Belgrade	92 kg
European Championships
Gold medal – first place	2021 Warsaw	97 kg
Russian National Championships
Gold medal – first place	2021 Ulan-Ude	97 kg
Gold medal – first place	2020 Naro-Fominsk	92 kg
Gold medal – first place	2019 Sochi	92 kg
Golden Grand Prix Ivan Yarygin
Silver medal – second place	2020 Krasnoyarsk	92 kg
Yasar Dogu Tournament
Silver medal – second place	2022 Istanbul	97 kg
World U23 Championships
Gold medal – first place	2017 Bydgoszcz	86 kg

Alikhan Lukmanovich Zhabrailov (Russian: Алихан Лукманович Жабраилов; born 14 April 1994) is a Russian freestyle wrestler of Chechen ethnicity who competes at 97 and 92 kilograms. At 92, Zhabrailov was the 2020 Individual World Cup champion, a 2019 World Championship bronze medalist, the Golden Grand Prix Ivan Yarygin 2020 silver medalist and a two–time Russian National champion (2019 and 2020). In 2021, he made the move up to 97 kilos, and has claimed the 2021 European Continental Championship and the 2021 Russian National Championship. He also competed at 86 kilos earlier in his career, claiming the 2017 U23 World Championship.

== Career ==
At the 2017 World U23 Wrestling Championship held in Bydgoszcz, Poland, he won the gold medal in the 86 kg event.

In 2020, he won the gold medal in the men's 92 kg event at the Individual Wrestling World Cup held in Belgrade, Serbia.

Zhabrailov came in first at the 2021 European Wrestling Championships in the 97 kg event.

In 2022, he won the silver medal in his event at the Yasar Dogu Tournament held in Istanbul, Turkey.

He competed at the 2024 European Wrestling Olympic Qualification Tournament in Baku, Azerbaijan and he earned a quota place for the Individual Neutral Athletes for the 2024 Summer Olympics in Paris, France, he missed these games due to the reallocations by the other NOCs.

== Achievements ==
Year	Tournament	Location	Result	Event
2019	World Championships	Nur-Sultan, Kazakhstan	3rd	Freestyle 92 kg
2021	European Championships	Warsaw, Poland	1st	Freestyle 97 kg

== Freestyle record ==
Senior Freestyle Matches
Res.	Record	Opponent	Score	Date	Event	Location
2022 Yasar Dogu (silver) at 97 kg
Loss	68–18	(Iran) Mohammad Hossein Mohammadian	3–4	26 February 2022	2022 Yasar Dogu International	Istanbul, Turkey
Win	68–17	(United States) Kollin Moore	8–2	26 February 2022	2022 Yasar Dogu International	Istanbul, Turkey
Win	67–17	(Russia) Shamil Musaev	7–3	26 February 2022	2022 Yasar Dogu International	Istanbul, Turkey
Win	66–17	(Turkey) Burak Şahin	TF 10–0	26 February 2022	2022 Yasar Dogu International	Istanbul, Turkey
2021 European Championships (gold) at 97 kg
Win	65–17	(Turkey) Süleyman Karadeniz	6–4	19–20 April 2021	2021 European Continental Championships	Warsaw, Poland
Win	64–17	(Poland) Radosław Baran	3–3	19–20 April 2021	2021 European Continental Championships	Warsaw, Poland
Win	63–17	(Ukraine) Murazi Mchedlidze	TF 13–0	19–20 April 2021	2021 European Continental Championships	Warsaw, Poland
2021 Russian Nationals (gold) at 97 kg
Win	62–17	(North Ossetia–Alania) Aslanbek Sotiev	5–0	10–15 March 2021	2021 Russian National Championships	(Russia) Ulan-Ude, Buryatia
Win	61–17	(Stavropol Krai) Khokh Khugaev	TF 10–0	10–15 March 2021	2021 Russian National Championships	(Russia) Ulan-Ude, Buryatia
Win	60–17	(Kabardino-Balkaria) Azret Shogenov	TF 10–0	10–15 March 2021	2021 Russian National Championships	(Russia) Ulan-Ude, Buryatia
Win	59–17	(Moscow Oblast) Asadula Ibragimov	5–2	10–15 March 2021	2021 Russian National Championships	(Russia) Ulan-Ude, Buryatia
Win	58–17	(Moscow Oblast) Georgy Gogaev	Fall	10–15 March 2021	2021 Russian National Championships	(Russia) Ulan-Ude, Buryatia
2020 Individual World Cup (gold) at 92 kg
Win	64–17	(Moldova) Georgii Rubaev	6–0	12–18 December 2020	2020 Individual World Cup	Belgrade, Serbia
Win	63–17	(Belarus) Arkadzi Pahasian	TF 10–0	12–18 December 2020	2020 Individual World Cup	Belgrade, Serbia
Win	62–17	(Switzerland) Samuel Scherrer	7–2	12–18 December 2020	2020 Individual World Cup	Belgrade, Serbia
2020 Russian Nationals (gold) at 92 kg
Win	61–17	(Dagestan) Magomed Kurbanov	3–2	15–18 October 2020	2020 Russian National Championships	(Russia) Naro-Fominsk, Moscow Oblast
Win	60–17	(Kabardino-Balkaria) Anzor Urishev	4–0	15–18 October 2020	2020 Russian National Championships	(Russia) Naro-Fominsk, Moscow Oblast
Win	59–17	(Irkutsk Oblast) Yuri Ivanov	9–0	15–18 October 2020	2020 Russian National Championships	(Russia) Naro-Fominsk, Moscow Oblast
Win	58–17	(Dagestan) Gadzhimagomed Nazhmudinov	5–1	15–18 October 2020	2020 Russian National Championships	(Russia) Naro-Fominsk, Moscow Oblast
2020 Ivan Yarygin Golden Grand Prix (silver) at 92 kg
Loss	57–17	(North Ossetia–Alania) Batyrbek Tsakulov	3–6	23–26 January 2020	Golden Grand Prix Ivan Yarygin 2020	(Russia) Krasnoyarsk, Krasnoyarsk Krai
Win	57–16	(Kabardino-Balkaria) Anzor Urishev	TF 12–1	23–26 January 2020	Golden Grand Prix Ivan Yarygin 2020	(Russia) Krasnoyarsk, Krasnoyarsk Krai
Win	56–16	(Kazakhstan) Abdimanap Baigenzheyev	TF 10–0	23–26 January 2020	Golden Grand Prix Ivan Yarygin 2020	(Russia) Krasnoyarsk, Krasnoyarsk Krai
Win	55–16	(Mongolia) Tsogtgerel Munkhbaatar	Fall	23–26 January 2020	Golden Grand Prix Ivan Yarygin 2020	(Russia) Krasnoyarsk, Krasnoyarsk Krai
2019 Alrosa Cup (gold) as Team RUS at 97 kg
Win	54–16	(Azerbaijan) Sharif Sharifov	5–2	29–30 November 2019	2019 Alrosa Cup Prix	Moscow, Russia
Win	53–16	(Cuba) Reineris Salas	7–6	29–30 November 2019	2019 Alrosa Cup Prix	Moscow, Russia
Win	52–16	(Russia) Anzor Urishev	5–3	29–30 November 2019	2019 Alrosa Cup Prix	Moscow, Russia
2019 Ugra Cup (silver) at 92 kg
Loss	51–16	(Dagestan) Magomed Kurbanov	1–6	24–28 October 2019	2019 Vladimir Semenov's Ugra Cup	Nefteyugansk, Russia
Win	51–15	(Russia) Alan Bagaev	TF 11–0	24–28 October 2019	2019 Vladimir Semenov's Ugra Cup	Nefteyugansk, Russia
Win	50–15	(Russia) Tazhudin Mukhtarov	TF 11–0	24–28 October 2019	2019 Vladimir Semenov's Ugra Cup	Nefteyugansk, Russia
Win	49–15	(Russia) Vsevolod Grigoryev	TF 10–0	24–28 October 2019	2019 Vladimir Semenov's Ugra Cup	Nefteyugansk, Russia
2019 World Championships (bronze) at 92 kg
Win	48–15	(Moldova) Georgii Rubaev	3–2	20–21 September 2019	2019 World Championships	Nur-Sultan, Kazakhstan
Loss	47–15	(Iran) Alireza Karimi	TF 0–10	20–21 September 2019	2019 World Championships	Nur-Sultan, Kazakhstan
Win	47–14	(Turkey) Süleyman Karadeniz	4–3	20–21 September 2019	2019 World Championships	Nur-Sultan, Kazakhstan
Win	46–14	(Belarus) Ivan Yankouski	8–1	20–21 September 2019	2019 World Championships	Nur-Sultan, Kazakhstan
2019 Russian Nationals (gold) at 92 kg
Win	45–14	(Dagestan) Magomed Kurbanov	2–1	4–8 July 2019	2019 Russian National Championships	Sochi, Russia
Win	44–14	(Kabardino-Balkaria) Anzor Urishev	5–4	4–8 July 2019	2019 Russian National Championships	Sochi, Russia
Win	43–14	(North Ossetia–Alania) Radik Nartikoev	4–1	4–8 July 2019	2019 Russian National Championships	Sochi, Russia
Win	42–14	(Buryatia) Tsedashi Dugarov	TF 10–0	4–8 July 2019	2019 Russian National Championships	Sochi, Russia
Win	41–14	(Moscow Oblast) Magomedmurad Baibekov	4–0	4–8 July 2019	2019 Russian National Championships	Sochi, Russia
2019 Ali Aliev Memorial International (silver) at 92 kg
Loss	40–14	(Azerbaijan) Sharif Sharifov	4–7	1–3 May 2019	2019 Ali Aliev Memorial International	(Russia) Kaspiysk, Dagestan
Win	40–13	(Belarus) Ivan Yankouski	3–1	1–3 May 2019	2019 Ali Aliev Memorial International	(Russia) Kaspiysk, Dagestan
Win	39–13	(Russia) Anzor Urishev	7–5	1–3 May 2019	2019 Ali Aliev Memorial International	(Russia) Kaspiysk, Dagestan
Win	38–13	(Azerbaijan) Javid Sadigov	TF 10–0	1–3 May 2019	2019 Ali Aliev Memorial International	(Russia) Kaspiysk, Dagestan
2019 World Cup (gold) as Team RUS at 92 kg
Win	37–13	(Turkey) Süleyman Karadeniz	4–0	16–17 March 2019	2019 World Cup	(Russia) Yakutsk, Sakha
Win	36–13	(Japan) Atsushi Matsumoto	TF 10–0	16–17 March 2019	2019 World Cup	(Russia) Yakutsk, Sakha
2019 Ivan Yarygin Golden Grand Prix 4th at 92 kg
Win	35–13	(China) Danan Xu	INJ	24–27 January 2019	Golden Grand Prix Ivan Yarygin 2019	(Russia) Krasnoyarsk, Krasnoyarsk Krai
Loss	34–13	(Mongolia) Ulziisaikhan Baasantsogt	TF 0–12	24–27 January 2019	Golden Grand Prix Ivan Yarygin 2019	(Russia) Krasnoyarsk, Krasnoyarsk Krai
Loss	34–12	(Russia) Magomed Kurbanov	0–3	24–27 January 2019	Golden Grand Prix Ivan Yarygin 2019	(Russia) Krasnoyarsk, Krasnoyarsk Krai
Win	34–11	(Russia) Batyrbek Tsakulov	7–3	24–27 January 2019	Golden Grand Prix Ivan Yarygin 2019	(Russia) Krasnoyarsk, Krasnoyarsk Krai
2018 Alans International (bronze) at 92 kg
Win	33–11	(Georgia (country)) Irakli Mtsituri	6–0	7–9 December 2018	2018 Alans International	(Russia) Vladikavkas, North Ossetia–Alania
Loss	32–11	(Russia) Magomed Kurbanov	5–6	7–9 December 2018	2018 Alans International	(Russia) Vladikavkas, North Ossetia–Alania
Win	32–10	(Russia) Muslim Magomedov	Fall	7–9 December 2018	2018 Alans International	(Russia) Vladikavkas, North Ossetia–Alania
Win	31–10	(Azerbaijan) Magomedgadzhi Khatiyev	TF 12–2	7–9 December 2018	2018 Alans International	(Russia) Vladikavkas, North Ossetia–Alania
2018 Akhmat Kadyrov Cup (silver) as Team EUR at 92 kg
Win	30–10	(Russia) Ahmed Bataev	4–0	23–26 November 2018	2018 Akhmat Kadyrov Cup	(Russia) Grozny, Chechnya
Loss	29–10	(Azerbaijan) Sharif Sharifov	TF 2–13	23–26 November 2018	2018 Akhmat Kadyrov Cup	(Russia) Grozny, Chechnya
Win	29–9	(Mongolia) Chinbat Altangerel	TF 12–0	23–26 November 2018	2018 Akhmat Kadyrov Cup	(Russia) Grozny, Chechnya
2018 Intercontinental Cup 9th at 92 kg
Loss	28–9	(Russia) Azamat Zakuev	1–3	15–19 November 2018	2018 Intercontinental Cup	(Russia) Khasavyurt, Dagestan
2018 Aleksander Medved Prizes (silver) at 92 kg
Loss	28–8	(Azerbaijan) Sharif Sharifov	4–6	14–16 September 2018	2018 Alexandr Medved Prizes	Minsk, Belarus
Win	28–7	(Russia) Magomed Kurbanov	5–0	14–16 September 2018	2018 Alexandr Medved Prizes	Minsk, Belarus
Win	27–7	(Belarus) Ivan Yankouski	INJ (4–0)	14–16 September 2018	2018 Alexandr Medved Prizes	Minsk, Belarus
2018 Russian Nationals (bronze) at 92 kg
Win	26–7	(North Ossetia–Alania) Guram Chertkoev	TF 10–0	3–5 August 2018	2018 Russian National Championships	(Russia) Odintsovo, Moscow Oblast
Win	25–7	(Dagestan) Sharap Alikhanov	TF 10–0	3–5 August 2018	2018 Russian National Championships	(Russia) Odintsovo, Moscow Oblast
Loss	24–7	(Kabardino-Balkaria) Anzor Urishev	4–4	3–5 August 2018	2018 Russian National Championships	(Russia) Odintsovo, Moscow Oblast
Win	24–6	(Moscow Oblast) Ahmed Hasanov	TF 10–0	3–5 August 2018	2018 Russian National Championships	(Russia) Odintsovo, Moscow Oblast
Win	23–6	(Irkutsk Oblast) Yuri Ivanov	TF 10–0	3–5 August 2018	2018 Russian National Championships	(Russia) Odintsovo, Moscow Oblast
2018 Ali Aliev Memorial International (bronze) at 92 kg
Win	22–6	(Russia) Kanzula Magomedov	TF 10–0	10–14 May 2018	2018 Ali Aliev Memorial International	(Russia) Kaspiysk, Dagestan
Loss	21–6	(Azerbaijan) Aslanbek Alborov	1–4	10–14 May 2018	2018 Ali Aliev Memorial International	(Russia) Kaspiysk, Dagestan
Win	21–5	(Mongolia) Baasantsegt Ulzisaikhan	TF 11–0	10–14 May 2018	2018 Ali Aliev Memorial International	(Russia) Kaspiysk, Dagestan
2018 Prix of Buryatia Republic's President (bronze) at 92 kg
Win	20–5	(Mongolia) Chinbat Altangerel	TF 10–0	10–11 March 2018	2018 Prix of Buryatia Republic's President	(Russia) Ulan-Ude, Buryatia
Loss	19–5	(Russia) Anzor Urishev	2–6	10–11 March 2018	2018 Prix of Buryatia Republic's President	(Russia) Ulan-Ude, Buryatia
Win	19–4	(Kazakhstan) Abubakar Turgayev	Fall	10–11 March 2018	2018 Prix of Buryatia Republic's President	(Russia) Ulan-Ude, Buryatia
Win	18–4	(Kazakhstan) Abdimanap Baigenzheyev	TF 11–0	10–11 March 2018	2018 Prix of Buryatia Republic's President	(Russia) Ulan-Ude, Buryatia
2017 U23 World Championships (gold) at 86 kg
Win	17–4	(Kazakhstan) Azamat Dauletbekov	8–7	25 November 2017	2017 U23 World Championships	Bydgoszcz, Poland
Win	16–4	(Belarus) Raman Chytadze	TF 10–0	25 November 2017	2017 U23 World Championships	Bydgoszcz, Poland
Win	15–4	(Israel) Uri Kalashnikov	TF 10–0	25 November 2017	2017 U23 World Championships	Bydgoszcz, Poland
Win	14–4	(Iran) Alireza Karimi	TF 14–3	25 November 2017	2017 U23 World Championships	Bydgoszcz, Poland
2017 Intercontinental Cup (gold) at 86 kg
Win	13–4	(Poland) Zbigniew Baranowski	5–4	12–13 October 2017	2017 Intercontinental Cup	(Russia) Khasavyurt, Dagestan
Win	12–4	(Belarus) Amarhajy Mahamedau	3–2	12–13 October 2017	2017 Intercontinental Cup	(Russia) Khasavyurt, Dagestan
Win	11–4	(Azerbaijan) Aleksander Gostiev	Fall	12–13 October 2017	2017 Intercontinental Cup	(Russia) Khasavyurt, Dagestan
Win	10–4	(Poland) Sebastian Jezierzański	6–3	12–13 October 2017	2017 Intercontinental Cup	(Russia) Khasavyurt, Dagestan
2017 Akhmat Kadyrov Cup (silver) as Team RUS at 86 kg
Loss	9–4	(Russia) Dauren Kurugliev	PP	23 November 2017	2017 Akhmat Kadyrov Cup	(Russia) Grozny, Chechnya
Win	9–3	(Uzbekistan) Rashid Kurbanov	8–2	23 November 2017	2017 Akhmat Kadyrov Cup	(Russia) Grozny, Chechnya
Loss	8–3	(Europe) Zbigniew Baranowski	3–6	23 November 2017	2017 Akhmat Kadyrov Cup	(Russia) Grozny, Chechnya
Win	8–2	(Kyrgyzstan) Dinislambek Taalaibek Uulu	TF 10–0	23 November 2017	2017 Akhmat Kadyrov Cup	(Russia) Grozny, Chechnya
2017 Ali Aliev Memorial International (gold) at 86 kg
Win	7–2	(Azerbaijan) Aleksander Gostiev	5–1	6–10 July 2017	2017 Ali Aliev Memorial International	(Russia) Kaspiysk, Dagestan
Win	6–2	(Russia) Tamerlan Akhmedov	10–4	6–10 July 2017	2017 Ali Aliev Memorial International	(Russia) Kaspiysk, Dagestan
Win	5–2	(Russia) Elkhan Asadov	Fall	6–10 July 2017	2017 Ali Aliev Memorial International	(Russia) Kaspiysk, Dagestan
Win	4–2	(Russia) Suleyman Omarov	8–0	6–10 July 2017	2017 Ali Aliev Memorial International	(Russia) Kaspiysk, Dagestan
2017 Russian Nationals 5th at 86 kg
Loss	3–2	(Dagestan) Arsen-Ali Musalaliev	Fall	14 June 2017	2017 Russian National Championships	(Russia) Nazran, Ingushetia
Win	3–1	(Dagestan) Magomed Kurbanov	8–4	14 June 2017	2017 Russian National Championships	(Russia) Nazran, Ingushetia
Loss	2–1	(North Ossetia–Alania) Vladislav Valiev	TF 0–11	14 June 2017	2017 Russian National Championships	(Russia) Nazran, Ingushetia
Win	2–0	(Chechnya) Umakhan Magomedkhanov	4–2	14 June 2017	2017 Russian National Championships	(Russia) Nazran, Ingushetia
Win	1–0	(Dagestan) Muslim Magomedov	TF 10–0	14 June 2017	2017 Russian National Championships	(Russia) Nazran, Ingushetia
