= Abdulrashid Sadulaev =

Russian freestyle wrestler (born 1996)

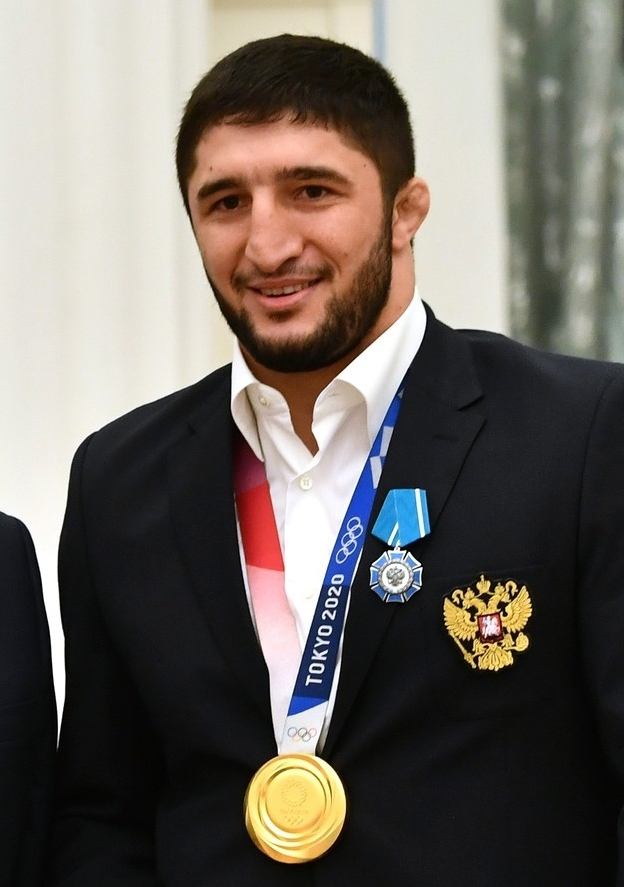
- Sadulaev in 2021

Personal information
- Native name: Абдулрашид Садулаев; ГІабдулрашид Садулаев
- Full name: Abdulrashid Bulachevich Sadulaev
- Nickname: The Russian Tank
- Born: 9 May 1996 (age 30) Tsurib, Dagestan, Russia
- Education: Dagestan State University
- Height: 1.77 m (5 ft 10 in)
- Weight: 97 kg (214 lb)

Sport
- Country: Russia
- Sport: Wrestling
- Rank: No. 1 UWW ranking at 92kg No. 1 at 97kg No. 1 P4P FloWrestling (2015); Grand Master of Sports
- Event: Freestyle
- Club: Gamid Gamidov Wrestling Club; Urojai Wrestling Club; Sadulaev Sport School
- Coached by: Shamil Omarov, Magomed Magomedov, Anvar Magomedgadzhiev, Sazhid Sazhidov
Medal record
| Event | 1st | 2nd | 3rd |
|---|---|---|---|
| Olympic Games | 2 | 0 | 0 |
| World Championship | 6 | 1 | 1 |
| European Championships | 5 | 0 | 0 |
| European Games | 2 | 0 | 0 |
| Ivan Yarygin Tournament | 3 | 0 | 0 |
| Other | 10 | 1 | 2 |
| Total | 27 | 2 | 2 |
Men's freestyle wrestling
Representing Russia, ROC and Individual Neutral Athletes
Olympic Games
| Gold medal – first place | 2016 Rio de Janeiro | 86 kg |
| Gold medal – first place | 2020 Tokyo | 97 kg |
World Championships
| Gold medal – first place | 2014 Tashkent | 86 kg |
| Gold medal – first place | 2015 Las Vegas | 86 kg |
| Gold medal – first place | 2018 Budapest | 97 kg |
| Gold medal – first place | 2019 Nur-Sultan | 97 kg |
| Gold medal – first place | 2021 Oslo | 97 kg |
| Gold medal – first place | 2024 Tirana | 92 kg |
| Silver medal – second place | 2017 Paris | 97 kg |
| Bronze medal – third place | 2026 Astana | 97 kg |
European Championships
| Gold medal – first place | 2014 Vantaa | 86 kg |
| Gold medal – first place | 2018 Kaspiysk | 92 kg |
| Gold medal – first place | 2019 Bucharest | 97 kg |
| Gold medal – first place | 2020 Rome | 97 kg |
| Gold medal – first place | 2026 Tirana | 97 kg |
Individual World Cup
| Gold medal – first place | 2020 Belgrade | 97 kg |
European Games
| Gold medal – first place | 2015 Baku | 86 kg |
| Gold medal – first place | 2019 Minsk | 97 kg |
European Nations Cup
| Gold medal – first place | 2015 Moscow | 97 kg |
Golden Grand Prix Ivan Yarygin
| Gold medal – first place | 2014 Krasnoyarsk | 86 kg |
| Gold medal – first place | 2018 Krasnoyarsk | 92 kg |
| Gold medal – first place | 2024 Krasnoyarsk | 97 kg |
Yasar Dogu Tournament
| Gold medal – first place | 2014 Istanbul | 86 kg |
Dan Kolov - Nikola Petrov Tournament
| Gold medal – first place | 2018 Sofia | 92 kg |
Golden Grand Prix
| Bronze medal – third place | 2013 Baku | 84 kg |
Grand Prix
| Gold medal – first place | 2014 Dabrowa | 86 kg |
| Gold medal – first place | 2015 Minsk | 86 kg |
| Gold medal – first place | 2016 Spala | 86 kg |
| Silver medal – second place | 2021 Kaspisk | 97 kg |
| Bronze medal – third place | 2012 Makhachkala | 84 kg |
European U23 Championship
| Gold medal – first place | 2016 Russe | 86 kg |
World Cadets Championships
| Gold medal – first place | 2012 Baku | 76 kg |
| Gold medal – first place | 2013 Zrenjanin | 85 kg |

Abdulrashid Bulachevich Sadulaev (Russian: Абдулрашид Булачевич Садулаев, IPA: [ɐbdʊɫrɐˈʂɨts sədʊˈɫa(ɪ̯)ɪf]; born 9 May 1996) is a Russian freestyle wrestler who competes at 92 kilograms and formerly at 97 and 86 kilograms. Sadulaev is widely regarded as one of the most dominant active freestyle wrestlers in the world as well as one of the greatest freestyle wrestlers of all time. He is currently signed to an exclusive contract with Real American Freestyle (RAF).

Nicknamed the "Russian Tank," he is a two time Olympic gold medalist (2016, 2020), a six–time World Champion (2014, 2015, 2018, 2019, 2021, 2024), the Individual World Cup champion (2020), a five–time European Champion (2014, 2018, 2019, 2020, 2026), three-time Ivan Yarygin Grand Prix winner (2014, 2018, 2024), a two-time European Games Champion (2015, 2019) and also a two–time Cadet World Champion (2012, 2013). He is also a seven-time Russian national champion. Sadulaev is one of two wrestlers to win world titles in three different weight classes.

== Background and personal life ==
Sadulaev was born in 1996 in the village of Tsurib, Charodinsky District, Dagestan, Russia. In 2016, he described himself as a devout Muslim, said he began wrestling seriously at age 13, and recalled winning a district title with a 300-ruble prize. He is the youngest of four siblings. He also stated that he does not have a Twitter account and uses Instagram, saying that accounts on Twitter using his identity are fake. After finishing 11th grade, he began training and won his first Cadet World Championship at age 16.

He graduated from the Law Institute of Dagestan State University.

== Career ==
=== 2012-14: World Champion, European Champion ===
Sadulaev's senior level debut was at the 2012 XLIII Ali Aliyev Memorial when he was 16 years old. He was defeated in the semifinals by Shamil Kudiyamagomedov, but ended up winning bronze. At the 2013 Memorial Heydar Aliyev, he lost by technical fall to Gamzat Osmanov. At the 2014 Russian National Championships, Sadulaev defeated Kudiyamagomedov and won his first national title. After the Russian Nationals, he participated at the 2014 World Wrestling Championships, where Sadulaev defeated Reineris Salas of Cuba 11–0 by technical fall.

=== 2015: World Champion ===
On 8 May 2015, Sadulaev won the Russian Freestyle Wrestling Nationals again and took part in the European Games in Baku, Azerbaijan, and World Championships in Las Vegas, Nevada. In the Games he outscored four opponents 42–1 (4–0) by technical fall and won gold medal. On 11 September 2015, he won World Championships, in the final knocking down Koloi Kartoev (Selim Yaşar) of Turkey, overall scoring 47–2 (6–0) in the championships. As a result, he was given a Mercedes-Benz G-Class G63 and Toyota Land Cruiser 200 by Dagestani business magnate Gadzhiev brothers and Ziyavudin Magomedov.

Sadulaev faced on 7 November wrestlers from Belarus, Turkey, Azerbaijan, Georgia and Poland at the European Nations Cup (Alrosa Cup). He beat number one Georgian wrestler Elizbar Odikadze via technical fall (11–0).

=== 2016: Olympic Champion ===
On 29 January, Sadulaev was expected to participate at the international tournament Golden Grand-Prix Ivan Yarygin 2016, but he pulled out in late January citing a minor shoulder injury.

Sadulaev returned to wrestling in the U23 European Championships in Ruse, Bulgaria on 3 April, and then he participated at the Wenceslas Ziolkowski Memorial XXV on 18 June 2016. At the European Championships he defeated Stefan Reichmuth of Switzerland in the eightfinals, Hungarian Gergely Gyrits in the quarterfinals, Belarusian Aliaksandr Hushtyn in the semifinals and finally Georgian Irakli Mtsituri; all victories were by technical superiority. On 18 June, Sadulaev won the Wenceslas Ziolkowski Memorial LII, beating Aleksey Mushtin, teammate Omargadzhi Magomedov, István Veréb of Hungary, Sebastian Jezierzanski and Zbigniew Baranowski, both from Poland, by technical superiority.

Sadulaev competed at the 2016 Summer Olympics without Russian Olympic Trials, that news was announced by the head coach of the Russian freestyle wrestling team Dzhambolat Tedeyev. Sadualev beat István Veréb by technical superiority, then Pedro Ceballos of Venezuela by points, fellow countryman Sharif Sharifov of Azerbaijan and in the gold medal match Selim Yasar, 5–0.

After Sadulaev's return to Russia, he was greeted by a rowdy welcome victory in Moscow. The Olympic athletes were also given a reception of the Russian medalists in the Kremlin, with the traditional ceremonial meeting being presided by President Vladimir Putin. The champions received BMW luxury crossovers, with the BMW X6 luxury crossovers being awarded for the gold medalists. Sadulaev was also greeted as a national hero in his native Dagestan. Aside from receiving financial reward for his Olympic achievements, Dagestan's Head of the Region Ramazan Abdulatipov presented Sadulaev an Akhal-Teke horse (native to Turkmenistan), which has a reputation for having speed, endurance and intelligence, and is highly valued in Dagestan.

=== 2017: Weight class changes, WC runner-up, European Champion ===
In an interview with Russian media, Sadulaev stated that after the Olympics he completely stopped training until 3 months before the 2017 world championships. Due to this he decided to move up a weight class, however 92 kilograms was not an Olympic weight class, so he moved to 97 kilograms. The total jump in weight was 11 kg or about 24.25 pounds.

Sadulaev competed in the Russian Nationals, defeating 2011 European runner-up Vladislav Baitcaev by decision (8–7). Sadulaev became the new Russian national champion in the 97 kg weight category. Before the final match he easily beat Yuri Belonovskiy, Umar Kudliev, Stanislav Gadzhiev and Tamerlan Rasuev by technical superiority. As a result, Ingushetian president Yunus-bek Yevkurov bestowed him a Toyota Land Cruiser 200.

At the 2017 World Championships, Sadulaev participated in the 97 kg weight category. En route he defeated Reineris Salas, Mateusz Filipczak, Elizbar Odikadze and Georgy Ketoyev. In the final he lost to Kyle Snyder in a close match.

=== 2018: World Champion, rematch against Snyder ===
After that he debuted in the weight category 92 kg at the Golden Grand Prix Ivan Yarygin 2018. In the final match, he beat 2012 Olympian and countryman Anzor Urishev.

On 3 August 2018, Sadulaev won his fourth national title at the Russian Nationals, knocking down Vladislav Baitcaev for gold by score (8–1).

Sadulaev was chosen to represent Russia in his weight class for the World Championships in Budapest, Hungary, facing countrymen Magomedgadzhi Nurov, Mamed Ibragimov, Magomed Ibragimov, who he all beat by technical fall. In the semi-final he defeated Elizbar Odikadze from Georgia, and in the final in a rematch he faced American Kyle Snyder, finishing him by pin fall.

=== 2019: European Games gold medalist and World Championships ===
Sadulaev won European Games in Minsk, Belarus where he didn't give up a single point. After made world team trials, he repeated the success of last year at the world championships in Nur-Sultan, Kazakhstan, in the final match he beat Azerbaijan's Sharif Sharifov by score (4–0). The rematch against USA's Kyle Snyder did not take place due to the loss of the American to Sharif Sharifov in the semifinals.

=== 2020 ===
Due to the pandemic, the 2020 World Wrestling Championships were canceled, and the Individual Wrestling World Cup was created as a placeholder. However, major wrestling nations like America and Japan did not participate due to restrictions. In 2020, he won the gold medal in the men's 97 kg event at the 2020 Individual Wrestling World Cup held in Belgrade, Serbia.

=== 2021 ===
Sadulaev clinched gold at the 2020 Summer Olympics by defeating his rival Snyder in the final. For that achievement, a member of the Russian State Duma rewarded him with a $1 million. Sadulaev once again defeated his rival Snyder to claim gold at the 2021 World Wrestling Championships.

=== 2022 ===
On 15 October 2022, Sadulaev faced Belarusian Aliaksandr Hushtyn at Poddubny wrestling league 2. He won this match by score (7–0). In 2022, Russian athletes were banned by the United World Wrestling Federation from competing. This led to Sadulaev being banned from the 2022 World Wrestling Championships in which he was considered by many to be the heavy favorite. Sadulaev's rival, Kyle Snyder, would go on to win the competition.

=== 2023 ===
On 18 September 2023, he competed at the 2023 World Championships held in Belgrade, Serbia. In the quarterfinals, he got a neck injury against his opponent Akhmed Tazhudinov of Bahrain and retired from the championships, being down 2–9 prior to retirement. It was only Sadulaev's fourth loss at the senior level, and the first since his loss in the final of the 2017 World Championships to Snyder.

=== 2024 ===
On 28 January 2024, Sadulaev won the Ivan Yarygin cup held in Krasnoyarsk, Russia. A few months later, he won the Russian Nationals for a sixth time at 97 kg. After he was barred from competing at the 2024 Olympics, Sadulaev defeated the 92 kg Russian Nationals champion Alan Bagaev in a special wrestle-off to qualify for the 2024 World Wrestling Championships. There, he won his 6th world title at 92 kilos, defeating World and Olympic champion David Taylor 7-0 and World champion Kamran Ghasempour 5–3. With this victory, he became the second wrestler in history to win world titles in three different weight classes.

=== 2026 ===
Sadulaev signed an exclusive contract with Real American Freestyle (RAF) on 15 January 2026.

He won gold at the 2026 European Wrestling Championships, defeating Batyrbek Tsakulov in the final.

He challenged Kyle Snyder for the RAF Light Heavyweight Championship in the co-main event of RAF Georgia on 11 July 2026. He lost via pin and suffered a knee injury.

At the 2026 World Wrestling Championships, Sadulaev was defeated by rival Kyle Snyder in the quarterfinals of the men's freestyle 97 kg event, losing 4–4 on criteria after leading 4–1 in the second period. The result reduced Sadulaev's lead in their head-to-head record to 3–2. He would end up winning bronze at the event.

== Championships and accomplishments ==
- 2012 Cadet World Champion – 76 kg
- 2012 Ali Aliyev Memorial Bronze Medalist – 84 kg
- 2013 Cadet World Champion – 85 kg
- 2013 Heydar Aliyev Memorial Bronze Medalist – 84 kg
- 2014 Golden Grand Prix Ivan Yarygin – 86 kg
- 2014 Golden Grand-Prix Yaşar Doğu – 86 kg
- 2014, 2015 Russian National Freestyle Wrestling Champion – 86 kg
- 2014 European Champion – 86 kg
- 2014 Wenceslas Ziolkowski Memorial XXIII – 86 kg
- 2014 World Champion – 86 kg
- 2015 Alexander Medved International – 86 kg
- 2015 European Games – 86 kg
- 2015 World Champion – 86 kg
- 2015 European Nations Cup (Moscow Lights-Alrosa Cup) – 97 kg
- 2016 European Championships U23 – 86 kg
- 2016 Wenceslas Ziolkowski Memorial LII – 86 kg
- 2016 Summer Olympics – 86 kg
- 2017 Russian National Freestyle Wrestling Champion – 97 kg
- 2017 World Championships Silver Medalist – 97 kg
- 2018 Golden Grand-Prix Ivan Yarygin – 92 kg
- 2018 Dan Kolov & Nikola Petrov international – 92 kg
- 2018 World Champion – 97 kg
- 2019 European Champion – 97 kg
- 2019 European Games Champion – 97 kg
- 2019 World Champion – 97 kg
- 2020 European Champion – 97 kg
- 2020 Russian National Freestyle Wrestling Champion – 97 kg
- 2020 Summer Olympics – 97 kg
- 2021 World Champion – 97 kg
- 2024 Golden Grand Prix Ivan Yarygin – 97 kg
- 2024 World Champion – 92 kg
- 2026 European Champion – 97 kg

== Freestyle wrestling record ==
| Res. | Record | Opponent | Score | Date | Event | Location |
RAF Georgia at 215 lb for the RAF Light Heavyweight Championship
| Loss | 160–4 | (United States) Kyle Snyder | Fall | 11 July 2026 | RAF Georgia | (Georgia (country)) Tbilisi, Georgia |
| Win | 160–3 | (Georgia (country)) Miriani Maisuradze | 6–0 | 31 October 2024 | 2024 World Championships | (Albania) Tirana |
| Win | 159–3 | (Iran) Kamran Ghasempour | 5–3 | 30 October 2024 | 2024 World Championships | (Albania) Tirana |
| Win | 158–3 | (Germany) Lars Schäfle | TF 10–0 | 30 October 2024 | 2024 World Championships | (Albania) Tirana |
| Win | 157–3 | (Azerbaijan) Abubakr Abakarov | 3–1 | 30 October 2024 | 2024 World Championships | (Albania) Tirana |
| Win | 156–3 | (United States) David Taylor | 7–0 | 30 October 2024 | 2024 World Championships | (Albania) Tirana |
| Win | 155–3 | (Russia) Arslan Bagaev | 10–7 | 2 October 2024 | 2024 Russian World Team Wrestle-offs | (Russia) Vladikavkaz |
| Win | 154–3 | (Russia) Shamil Musaev | 5–2 | 28 January 2024 | 2024 Golden Grand Prix Ivan Yarygin | (Russia) Krasnoyarsk |
| Win | 153–3 | (China) Awusayiman Habila | 6–0 | 27 January 2024 | 2024 Golden Grand Prix Ivan Yarygin | (Russia) Krasnoyarsk |
| Win | 152–3 | (Russia) Shakhman Nukhaev | TF 12–0 | 27 January 2024 | 2024 Golden Grand Prix Ivan Yarygin | (Russia) Krasnoyarsk |
| Win | 151–3 | (Russia) Ramazan Shabanov | 8–1 | 27 January 2024 | 2024 Golden Grand Prix Ivan Yarygin | (Russia) Krasnoyarsk |
| Loss | 150-3 | (Turkey) İbrahim Çiftçi | Forfeit | 20 September 2023 | 2023 World Wrestling Championships | (Serbia) Belgrade |
| Loss | 150-3 | (United States) Kyle Snyder | Forfeit | 20 September 2023 | 2023 World Wrestling Championships | (Serbia) Belgrade |
| Loss | 150–3 | (Bahrain) Akhmed Tazhudinov | 2–9 (injury default) | 19 September 2023 | 2023 World Wrestling Championships | (Serbia) Belgrade |
| Win | 150–2 | (Iran) Mojtaba Goleij | 4–4 (fall) | 19 September 2023 | 2023 World Wrestling Championships | (Serbia) Belgrade |
| Win | 149–2 | (Hungary) Vladislav Baitsaev | 4–2 | 19 September 2023 | 2023 World Wrestling Championships | (Serbia) Belgrade |
| Win | 148–2 | (South Africa) Nicolaas de Lange | 7–0 | 19 September 2023 | 2023 World Wrestling Championships | (Serbia) Belgrade |
| Win | 147–2 | (Russia) Sergey Kozyrev | 5–2 | 28 July 2023 | 2023 Poddubny wrestling league | (Russia) Vladikavkaz |
| Win | 146–2 | (Russia) Shamil Musaev | 6–1 | 28 July 2023 | 2023 Poddubny wrestling league | (Russia) Vladikavkaz |
| Win | 145–2 | (Belarus) Aliaksandr Hushtyn | 7–0 | 15 October 2022 | 2022 Poddubny wrestling league 2 | (Russia) Moscow |
| Win | 144–2 | (North Macedonia) Magomedgaji Nurov | 5–1 | 2 December 2021 | 2021 Alrosa Cup | (Russia) Moscow |
| Win | 143–2 | (United States) Kyle Snyder | 6–0 | 5 October 2021 | 2021 World Wrestling Championships | (Norway) Oslo |
| Win | 142–2 | (Ukraine) Mahamed Zakariiev | TF 11–0 | 4 October 2021 | 2021 World Wrestling Championships | (Norway) Oslo |
| Win | 141–2 | (Belarus) Aliaksandr Hushtyn | 9–4 | 4 October 2021 | 2021 World Wrestling Championships | (Norway) Oslo |
| Win | 140–2 | (Japan) Takashi Ishiguro | TF 10–0 | 4 October 2021 | 2021 World Wrestling Championships | (Norway) Oslo |
| Win | 139–2 | (United States) Kyle Snyder | 6–3 | 7 August 2021 | 2020 Summer Olympics | (Japan) Tokyo |
| Win | 138–2 | (Cuba) Reineris Salas | 4–0 | 6 August 2021 | 2020 Summer Olympics | (Japan) Tokyo |
| Win | 137–2 | (Georgia (country)) Elizbar Odikadze | TF 10–0 | 6 August 2021 | 2020 Summer Olympics | (Japan) Tokyo |
| Win | 136–2 | (Azerbaijan) Sharif Sharifov | 5–0 | 6 August 2021 | 2020 Summer Olympics | (Japan) Tokyo |
| Loss | 135-2 | (Uzbekistan) Magomed Ibragimov | Forfeit | 25 June 2021 | 2021 Ali Aliev Memorial | (Russia) Kaspiysk |
| Win | 135–2 | (Russia) Vladislav Baitcaev | 5–1 | 25 June 2021 | 2021 Ali Aliev Memorial | (Russia) Kaspiysk |
| Win | 134–2 | (Russia) Magomedkhan Magomedov | 9–6 | 25 June 2021 | 2021 Ali Aliev Memorial | (Russia) Kaspiysk |
| Win | 133–2 | (Iran) Mojtaba Goleij | 4–0 | 25 June 2021 | 2021 Ali Aliev Memorial | (Russia) Kaspiysk |
| Win | 132–2 | (Russia) David Kabisov | TF 12–2 | 25 June 2021 | 2021 Ali Aliev Memorial | (Russia) Kaspiysk |
| Win | 131–2 | (Belarus) Aliaksandr Hushtyn | Forfeit | 18 December 2020 | 2020 Individual World Cup | (Serbia) Belgrade |
| Win | 130–2 | (Ukraine) Valeriy Andriytsev | TF 12–1 | 17 December 2020 | 2020 Individual World Cup | (Serbia) Belgrade |
| Win | 129–2 | (Poland) Radosław Baran | TF 12–2 | 17 December 2020 | 2020 Individual World Cup | (Serbia) Belgrade |
| Win | 128–2 | (Turkey) Süleyman Karadeniz | 8–0 | 17 December 2020 | 2020 Individual World Cup | (Serbia) Belgrade |
| Win | 127–2 | (North Ossetia–Alania) Aslanbek Sotiev | 8–2 | 18 October 2020 | 2020 Russian Nationals | (Russia) Naro-Fominsk |
| Win | 126–2 | (Dagestan) Rasul Magomedov | TF 10–0 | 18 October 2020 | 2020 Russian Nationals | (Russia) Naro-Fominsk |
| Win | 125–2 | (North Ossetia–Alania) David Dzugaev | TF 10–0 | 18 October 2020 | 2020 Russian Nationals | (Russia) Naro-Fominsk |
| Win | 124–2 | (North Ossetia–Alania) Erik Dzhioev | TF 15–2 | 18 October 2020 | 2020 Russian Nationals | (Russia) Naro-Fominsk |
| Win | 123–2 | (Romania) Albert Saritov | 6–0 | 15 February 2020 | 2020 European Championships | (Italy) Rome |
| Win | 122–2 | (Georgia (country)) Elizbar Odikadze | 6–0 | 14 February 2020 | 2020 European Championships | (Italy) Rome |
| Win | 121–2 | (Azerbaijan) Nurmagomed Gadzhiev | 10–4 | 14 February 2020 | 2020 European Championships | (Italy) Rome |
| Win | 120–2 | (Turkey) İbrahim Bölükbaşı | 9–4 | 14 February 2020 | 2020 European Championships | (Italy) Rome |
| Win | 119–2 | (North Macedonia) Magomedgadzhi Nurov | 8–2 | 14 February 2020 | 2020 European Championships | (Italy) Rome |
| Win | 118–2 | (Azerbaijan) Sharif Sharifov | 4–0 | 22 September 2019 | 2019 World Championships | (Kazakhstan) Nur-Sultan |
| Win | 117–2 | (Kazakhstan) Alisher Yergali | 8–1 | 21 September 2019 | 2019 World Championships | (Kazakhstan) Nur-Sultan |
| Win | 116–2 | (North Macedonia) Magomedgadzhi Nurov | 6–0 | 21 September 2019 | 2019 World Championships | (Kazakhstan) Nur-Sultan |
| Win | 115–2 | (Moldova) Nicolae Ceban | Tech Fall | 21 September 2019 | 2019 World Championships | (Kazakhstan) Nur-Sultan |
| Win | 114–2 | (North Ossetia–Alania) Vladislav Baitcaev | Tech Fall | 16 August 2019 | 2019 Russian World Team Wrestle-offs | Sochi, Krasnodar Krai |
| Win | 113–2 | (Azerbaijan) Nurmagomed Gadzhiev | Injury | 27 June 2019 | 2019 European Games | (Belarus) Minsk |
| Win | 112–2 | (Belarus) Aliaksandr Hushtyn | 6–0 | 26 June 2019 | 2019 European Games | (Belarus) Minsk |
| Win | 111–2 | (North Macedonia) Magomedgadzhi Nurov | 6–0 | 26 June 2019 | 2019 European Games | (Belarus) Minsk |
| Win | 110–2 | (Hungary) Mihaly Szabo | Tech Fall | 26 June 2019 | 2019 European Games | (Belarus) Minsk |
| Win | 109–2 | (Belarus) Aliaksandr Hushtyn | 3–1 | 9 April 2019 | 2019 European Championships | (Romania) Bucharest |
| Win | 108–2 | (North Macedonia) Magomedgadzhi Nurov | Tech.Fall; 4:39 | 8 April 2019 | 2019 European Championships | (Romania) Bucharest |
| Win | 107–2 | (Germany) Gennadij Cudinovic | Tech.Fall; 0:21 | 8 April 2019 | 2019 European Championships | (Romania) Bucharest |
| Win | 106–2 | (Azerbaijan) Nurmagomed Gadzhiev | 3–0 | 8 April 2019 | 2019 European Championships | (Romania) Bucharest |
| Win | 105–2 | (United States) Kyle Snyder | Fall; 1:10 | 23 October 2018 | 2018 World Championships | (Hungary) Budapest |
| Win | 104–2 | (Georgia (country)) Elizbar Odikadze | Tech.Fall; 2:35 | 22 October 2018 | 2018 World Championships | (Hungary) Budapest |
| Win | 103–2 | (Uzbekistan) Magomed Ibragimov | Tech.Fall; 4:51 | 22 October 2018 | 2018 World Championships | (Hungary) Budapest |
| Win | 102–2 | (Kazakhstan) Mamed Ibragimov | Tech.Fall; 3:23 | 22 October 2018 | 2018 World Championships | (Hungary) Budapest |
| Win | 101–2 | (North Macedonia) Magomedgadzhi Nurov | Tech.Fall; 1:42 | 22 October 2018 | 2018 World Championships | (Hungary) Budapest |
| Win | 100–2 | (North Ossetia–Alania) Vladislav Baitcaev | 8–1 | 3 August 2018 | 2018 Russian Nationals | Odintsovo, Moscow Oblast |
| Win | 99–2 | (North Ossetia–Alania) Batraz Gazzaev | 11–2 | 3 August 2018 | 2018 Russian Nationals | Odintsovo, Moscow Oblast |
| Win | 98–2 | (North Ossetia–Alania) Georgy Gogaev | Tech. Fall | 3 August 2018 | 2018 Russian Nationals | Odintsovo, Moscow Oblast |
| Win | 97–2 | (Dagestan) Zaynulla Kurbanov | 5–0 | 3 August 2018 | 2018 Russian Nationals | Odintsovo, Moscow Oblast |
| Win | 96–2 | (Azerbaijan) Sharif Sharifov | 2–1 | 5 May 2018 | 2018 European Championships | (Russia) Kaspiysk |
| Win | 95–2 | (Georgia (country)) Irakli Mtsituri | Tech. Fall; 5:10 | 5 May 2018 | 2018 European Championships | (Russia) Kaspiysk |
| Win | 94–2 | (Ukraine) Kyrylo Mieshkov | Tech. Fall; 3:39 | 5 May 2018 | 2018 European Championships | (Russia) Kaspiysk |
| Win | 93–2 | (Austria) Dominic Peter | Tech. Fall; 3:15 | 5 May 2018 | 2018 European Championships | (Russia) Kaspiysk |
| Win | 92–2 | (Georgia (country)) Irakli Mtsituri | Tech. Fall; 3:36 | 23 March 2018 | Nikola Petrov and Dan Kolov international | (Bulgaria) Sofia |
| Win | 91–2 | (Belarus) Ivan Yankouski | Tech. Fall; 3:25 | 23 March 2018 | Nikola Petrov and Dan Kolov international | (Bulgaria) Sofia |
| Win | 90–2 | (Hungary) Pavel Oleynik | Tech. Fall; 4:44 | 23 March 2018 | Nikola Petrov and Dan Kolov international | (Bulgaria) Sofia |
| Win | 89–2 | (Moldova) Nicolae Ceban | 6–0 | 23 March 2018 | Nikola Petrov and Dan Kolov international | (Bulgaria) Sofia |
| Win | 88–2 | (Russia) Anzor Urishev | 6–0 | 28 January 2018 | 2018 Golden Grand Prix Ivan Yarygin | (Russia) Krasnoyarsk |
| Win | 87–2 | (United States) Nicholas Heflin | Tech. Fall; 2:17 | 28 January 2018 | 2018 Golden Grand Prix Ivan Yarygin | (Russia) Krasnoyarsk |
| Win | 86–2 | (Mongolia) Turtogtokh Luvsandorj | Tech. Fall; 1:26 | 28 January 2018 | 2018 Golden Grand Prix Ivan Yarygin | (Russia) Krasnoyarsk |
| Win | 85–2 | (Iran) Abzar Eslami | Tech. Fall | 7 December 2017 | World Clubs Cup 2017 | (Iran) Teheran |
| Win | 84–2 | (Kazakhstan) Alisher Yergali | Fall | 7 December 2017 | World Clubs Cup 2017 | (Iran) Teheran |
| Loss | 83–2 | (United States) Kyle Snyder | 6–5 | 26 August 2017 | 2017 World Championships | (France) Paris |
| Win | 83–1 | (Armenia) Georgy Ketoyev | 2–0 | 26 August 2017 | 2017 World Championships | (France) Paris |
| Win | 82–1 | (Georgia (country)) Elizbar Odikadze | Tech. Fall; 4:59 | 26 August 2017 | 2017 World Championships | (France) Paris |
| Win | 81–1 | (Poland) Mateusz Filipczak | Tech. Fall; 4:10 | 26 August 2017 | 2017 World Championships | (France) Paris |
| Win | 80–1 | (Cuba) Reineris Salas | 3–0 | 26 August 2017 | 2017 World Championships | (France) Paris |
| Win | 79–1 | (North Ossetia–Alania) Vladislav Baitcaev | 8–7 | 14 June 2017 | 2017 Russian Nationals | Nazran, Ingushetia |
| Win | 78–1 | (Chechnya) Tamerlan Rasuev | Tech. Fall; 2:51 | 14 June 2017 | 2017 Russian Nationals | Nazran, Ingushetia |
| Win | 77–1 | (Leningrad Oblast) Stanislav Gadzhiev | Tech. Fall; 1:27 | 14 June 2017 | 2017 Russian Nationals | Nazran, Ingushetia |
| Win | 76–1 | (Dagestan) Umar Kudliev | Tech. Fall; 0:57 | 14 June 2017 | 2017 Russian Nationals | Nazran, Ingushetia |
| Win | 75–1 | (Krasnoyarsk Krai) Yuri Belonovskiy | Tech. Fall; 5:07 | 14 June 2017 | 2017 Russian Nationals | Nazran, Ingushetia |
| Win | 74–1 | (Turkey) Selim Yasar | 5–0 | 20 August 2016 | 2016 Summer Olympics | (Brazil) Rio de Janeiro |
| Win | 73–1 | (Azerbaijan) Sharif Sharifov | 8–1 | 20 August 2016 | 2016 Summer Olympics | (Brazil) Rio de Janeiro |
| Win | 72–1 | (Venezuela) Pedro Ceballos | 5–0 | 20 August 2016 | 2016 Summer Olympics | (Brazil) Rio de Janeiro |
| Win | 71–1 | (Hungary) István Veréb | Tech. Fall; 3:34 | 20 August 2016 | 2016 Summer Olympics | (Brazil) Rio de Janeiro |
| Win | 70–1 | (Poland) Zbigniew Baranowski | Tech. Fall; 1:36 | 18 June 2016 | Wenceslas Ziolkowski Memorial LII | (Poland) Dąbrowa Górnicza |
| Win | 69–1 | (Poland) Sebastian Jezierzanski | Tech. Fall; 2:41 | 18 June 2016 | Wenceslas Ziolkowski Memorial LII | (Poland) Dąbrowa Górnicza |
| Win | 68–1 | (Hungary) István Veréb | Tech. Fall; 4:25 | 18 June 2016 | Wenceslas Ziolkowski Memorial LII | (Poland) Dąbrowa Górnicza |
| Win | 67–1 | (Belarus) Omargadzhi Magomedov | 7–1 | 18 June 2016 | Wenceslas Ziolkowski Memorial LII | (Poland) Dąbrowa Górnicza |
| Win | 66–1 | (Belarus) Aleksey Mushtin | Tech. Fall; 3:25 | 18 June 2016 | Wenceslas Ziolkowski Memorial LII | (Poland) Dąbrowa Górnicza |
| Win | 65–1 | (Georgia (country)) Irakli Mtsituri | Tech. Fall; 5:01 | 3 April 2016 | European Championship U23 | (Bulgaria) Ruse |
| Win | 64–1 | (Belarus) Aliaksandr Hushtyn | Tech. Fall; 3:27 | 3 April 2016 | European Championship U23 | (Bulgaria) Ruse |
| Win | 63–1 | (Hungary) Gergely Gyrits | Tech. Fall; 3:26 | 3 April 2016 | European Championship U23 | (Bulgaria) Ruse |
| Win | 62–1 | (Switzerland) Stefan Reichmuth | Tech. Fall; 1:59 | 3 April 2016 | European Championship U23 | (Bulgaria) Ruse |
| Win | 61–1 | (Georgia (country)) Elizbar Odikadze | Tech. Fall; 5:33 | 7 November 2015 | European Nations Cup 2015 (Moscow Lights) | (Russia) Moscow |
| Win | 60–1 | (Turkey) Selim Yasar | 6–0 | 11 September 2015 | 2015 World Championships | (United States) Las Vegas, NV |
| Win | 59–1 | (Iran) Alireza Karimi | 6–2 | 11 September 2015 | 2015 World Championships | (United States) Las Vegas, NV |
| Win | 58–1 | (Bulgaria) Mihail Ganev | Tech. Fall; 2:34 | 11 September 2015 | 2015 World Championships | (United States) Las Vegas, NV |
| Win | 57–1 | (Mongolia) Orgodolyn Üitümen | Tech. Fall; 2:15 | 11 September 2015 | 2015 World Championships | (United States) Las Vegas, NV |
| Win | 56–1 | (Israel) David Radchenko | Fall; 0:30 | 11 September 2015 | 2015 World Championships | (United States) Las Vegas, NV |
| Win | 55–1 | (Japan) Shinya Matsumoto | Tech. Fall; 3:33 | 11 September 2015 | 2015 World Championships | (United States) Las Vegas, NV |
| Win | 54–1 | (Moldova) Piotr Ianulov | Tech. Fall; 1:38 | 18 June 2015 | 2015 European Games | (Azerbaijan) Baku |
| Win | 53–1 | (Poland) Radosław Marcinkiewicz | Tech. Fall; 2:59 | 18 June 2015 | 2015 European Games | (Azerbaijan) Baku |
| Win | 52–1 | (Azerbaijan) Nurmagomed Gadzhiev | Tech. Fall; 5:28 | 18 June 2015 | 2015 European Games | (Azerbaijan) Baku |
| Win | 51–1 | (Italy) Tudor Zuz | Tech. Fall; 0:46 | 18 June 2015 | 2015 European Games | (Azerbaijan) Baku |
| Win | 50–1 | (Dagestan) Shamil Kudiyamagomedov | 4–0 | 8 May 2015 | 2015 Russian Nationals | Makhachkala, Dagestan |
| Win | 49–1 | (Dagestan) Akhmed Magomedov | 3–0 | 8 May 2015 | 2015 Russian Nationals | Makhachkala, Dagestan |
| Win | 48–1 | (Kabardino-Balkaria) Anzor Urishev | 7–0 | 8 May 2015 | 2015 Russian Nationals | Makhachkala, Dagestan |
| Win | 47–1 | (Kaliningrad Oblast) Vyacheslav Sugako | Tech. Fall | 8 May 2015 | 2015 Russian Nationals | Makhachkala, Dagestan |
| Win | 46–1 | (North Ossetia–Alania) Georgy Rubaev | 5–0 | 8 May 2015 | 2015 Russian Nationals | Makhachkala, Dagestan |
| Win | 45–1 | (Belarus) Aliaksandr Hushtyn | Fall; 0:54 | 7 March 2015 | Alexander Medved International | (Belarus) Minsk |
| Win | 44–1 | (United States) Richard Perry | Tech. Fall; 1:55 | 7 March 2015 | Alexander Medved International | (Belarus) Minsk |
| Win | 43–1 | (Moldova) Piotr Ianulov | Tech. Fall; 4:02 | 7 March 2015 | Alexander Medved International | (Belarus) Minsk |
| Win | 42–1 | (Azerbaijan) Haji Alijanov | 5–0 | 7 March 2015 | Alexander Medved International | (Belarus) Minsk |
| Win | 41–1 | (Belarus) Evgeny Aliashkevich | Tech. Fall; 3:10 | 7 March 2015 | Alexander Medved International | (Belarus) Minsk |
| Win | 40–1 | (Cuba) Reineris Salas | Tech. Fall; 1:25 | 8 September 2014 | 2014 World Championships | (Uzbekistan) Tashkent |
| Win | 39–1 | (Kazakhstan) Aslan Kakhidze | Tech. Fall; 0:59 | 8 September 2014 | 2014 World Championships | (Uzbekistan) Tashkent |
| Win | 38–1 | (Bulgaria) Mihail Ganev | Tech. Fall; 0:28 | 8 September 2014 | 2014 World Championships | (Uzbekistan) Tashkent |
| Win | 37–1 | (Ukraine) Dzhambul Tsitadze | Tech. Fall; 2:27 | 8 September 2014 | 2014 World Championships | (Uzbekistan) Tashkent |
| Win | 36–1 | (Turkey) Selim Yasar | 9–2 | 8 September 2014 | 2014 World Championships | (Uzbekistan) Tashkent |
| Win | 35–1 | (Hungary) István Veréb | 12–4 | 3 August 2014 | Wenceslas Ziolkowski Memorial XXIII | (Poland) Dąbrowa Górnicza |
| Win | 34–1 | (Belarus) Aliaksandr Hushtyn | 8–3 | 3 August 2014 | Wenceslas Ziolkowski Memorial XXIII | (Poland) Dąbrowa Górnicza |
| Win | 33–1 | (Poland) Zbigniew Baranowski | 8–3 | 3 August 2014 | Wenceslas Ziolkowski Memorial XXIII | (Poland) Dąbrowa Górnicza |
| Win | 32–1 | (Iran) Javad Mohammad Ebrahimi | 9–3 | 3 August 2014 | Wenceslas Ziolkowski Memorial XXIII | (Poland) Dąbrowa Górnicza |
| Win | 31–1 | (Poland) Radosław Marcinkiewicz | 3–2 | 3 August 2014 | Wenceslas Ziolkowski Memorial XXIII | (Poland) Dąbrowa Górnicza |
| Win | 30–1 | (Dagestan) Shamil Kudiyamagomedov | 3–1 | 22 June 2014 | 2014 Russian Nationals | (Sakha Republic) Yakutsk, Sakha |
| Win | 29–1 | (North Ossetia–Alania) Soslan Ktsoyev | 4–3 | 22 June 2014 | 2014 Russian Nationals | (Sakha Republic) Yakutsk, Sakha |
| Win | 28–1 | (Dagestan) Dauren Kurugliev | 4–0 | 22 June 2014 | 2014 Russian Nationals | (Sakha Republic) Yakutsk, Sakha |
| Win | 27–1 | (North Ossetia–Alania) Albert Ikaev | Tech. Fall | 22 June 2014 | 2014 Russian Nationals | (Sakha Republic) Yakutsk, Sakha |
| Win | 26–1 | (Ingushetia) Said Dakhkilgov | Tech. Fall | 22 June 2014 | 2014 Russian Nationals | (Sakha Republic) Yakutsk, Sakha |
| Win | 25–1 | (Belarus) Murad Gaidarov | 5–2 | 4 April 2014 | 2014 European Championships | (Finland) Vantaa |
| Win | 24–1 | (Hungary) István Veréb | Tech. Fall; 2:05 | 4 April 2014 | 2014 European Championships | (Finland) Vantaa |
| Win | 23–1 | (Georgia (country)) Dato Marsagishvili | Tech. Fall; 4:52 | 4 April 2014 | 2014 European Championships | (Finland) Vantaa |
| Win | 22–1 | (Romania) Ștefan Gheorghiță | Tech. Fall; 1:34 | 4 April 2014 | 2014 European Championships | (Finland) Vantaa |
| Win | 21–1 | (Poland) Sebastian Jezierzanski | Tech. Fall; 1:29 | 4 April 2014 | 2014 European Championships | (Finland) Vantaa |
| Win | 20–1 | (United States) Phil Keddy | Tech. Fall; 2:44 | 16 February 2014 | Golden Grand Prix Yaşar Doğu 2014 | (Turkey) Istanbul |
| Win | 19–1 | (United States) Clayton Foster | 6–2 | 16 February 2014 | Golden Grand Prix Yaşar Doğu 2014 | (Turkey) Istanbul |
| Win | 18–1 | (Turkey) Ahmet Bilici | 10–10 | 16 February 2014 | Golden Grand Prix Yaşar Doğu 2014 | (Turkey) Istanbul |
| Win | 17–1 | (Iran) Jalal Zaman | Tech. Fall; 5:59 | 16 February 2014 | Golden Grand Prix Yaşar Doğu 2014 | (Turkey) Istanbul |
| Win | 16–1 | (Iran) Javad Mohammad Ebrahimi | 8–2 | 16 February 2014 | Golden Grand Prix Yaşar Doğu 2014 | (Turkey) Istanbul |
| Win | 15–1 | (Russia) Shamil Kudiyamagomedov | 13–7 | 26 January 2014 | Golden Grand-Prix Ivan Yarygin 2014 | (Russia) Krasnoyarsk |
| Win | 14–1 | (Russia) Soslan Ktsoyev | 4–2 | 26 January 2014 | Golden Grand-Prix Ivan Yarygin 2014 | (Russia) Krasnoyarsk |
| Win | 13–1 | (Russia) Anzor Urishev | 4–2 | 26 January 2014 | Golden Grand-Prix Ivan Yarygin 2014 | (Russia) Krasnoyarsk |
| Win | 12–1 | (Russia) Dauren Kurugliev | 4–0 | 26 January 2014 | Golden Grand-Prix Ivan Yarygin 2014 | (Russia) Krasnoyarsk |
| Win | 11–1 | (Russia) Shamil Katinovasov | Tech. Fall | 26 January 2014 | Golden Grand-Prix Ivan Yarygin 2014 | (Russia) Krasnoyarsk |
| Win | 10–1 | (Azerbaijan) Alexander Gostiev | 5–4 | 22 November 2013 | Memorial Heydar Aliyev 2013 | (Azerbaijan) Baku |
| Win | 9–1 | (United States) Keith Gavin | Tech. Fall; 5:05 | 22 November 2013 | Memorial Heydar Aliyev 2013 | (Azerbaijan) Baku |
| Loss | 8–1 | (Azerbaijan) Gamzat Osmanov | Tech. Fall; 1:42 | 22 November 2013 | Memorial Heydar Aliyev 2013 | (Azerbaijan) Baku |
| Win | 8–0 | (Turkey) Muhammed Enes Altun | Fall; 0:46 | 24 August 2013 | 2013 Cadet World Championships | (Serbia) Zrenjanin |
| Win | 7–0 | (Azerbaijan) Nurmagomed Gadzhiev | Tech. Fall; 0:20 (2) | 24 August 2013 | 2013 Cadet World Championships | (Serbia) Zrenjanin |
| Win | 6–0 | (Iran) Hossein Shahbazi-Gazvar | Tech. Fall; 1:51 | 24 August 2013 | 2013 Cadet World Championships | (Serbia) Zrenjanin |
| Win | 5–0 | (India) Peaveen Praveen | Tech. Fall; 0:59 | 24 August 2013 | 2013 Cadet World Championships | (Serbia) Zrenjanin |
| Win | 4–0 | (Ukraine) Ruslan Ruchko | 12–9 | 22 August 2012 | 2012 Cadet World Championships | (Azerbaijan) Baku |
| Win | 3–0 | (Mongolia) Turmunkh Ganbold | Tech. Fall; 1:35 (2) | 22 August 2012 | 2012 Cadet World Championships | (Azerbaijan) Baku |
| Win | 2–0 | (Japan) Shota Shirai | 9–2 | 22 August 2012 | 2012 Cadet World Championships | (Azerbaijan) Baku |
| Win | 1–0 | (Tajikistan) Faruh Sharipov | Tech. Fall; 0:23 (2) | 22 August 2012 | 2012 Cadet World Championships | (Azerbaijan) Baku |

== Awards ==
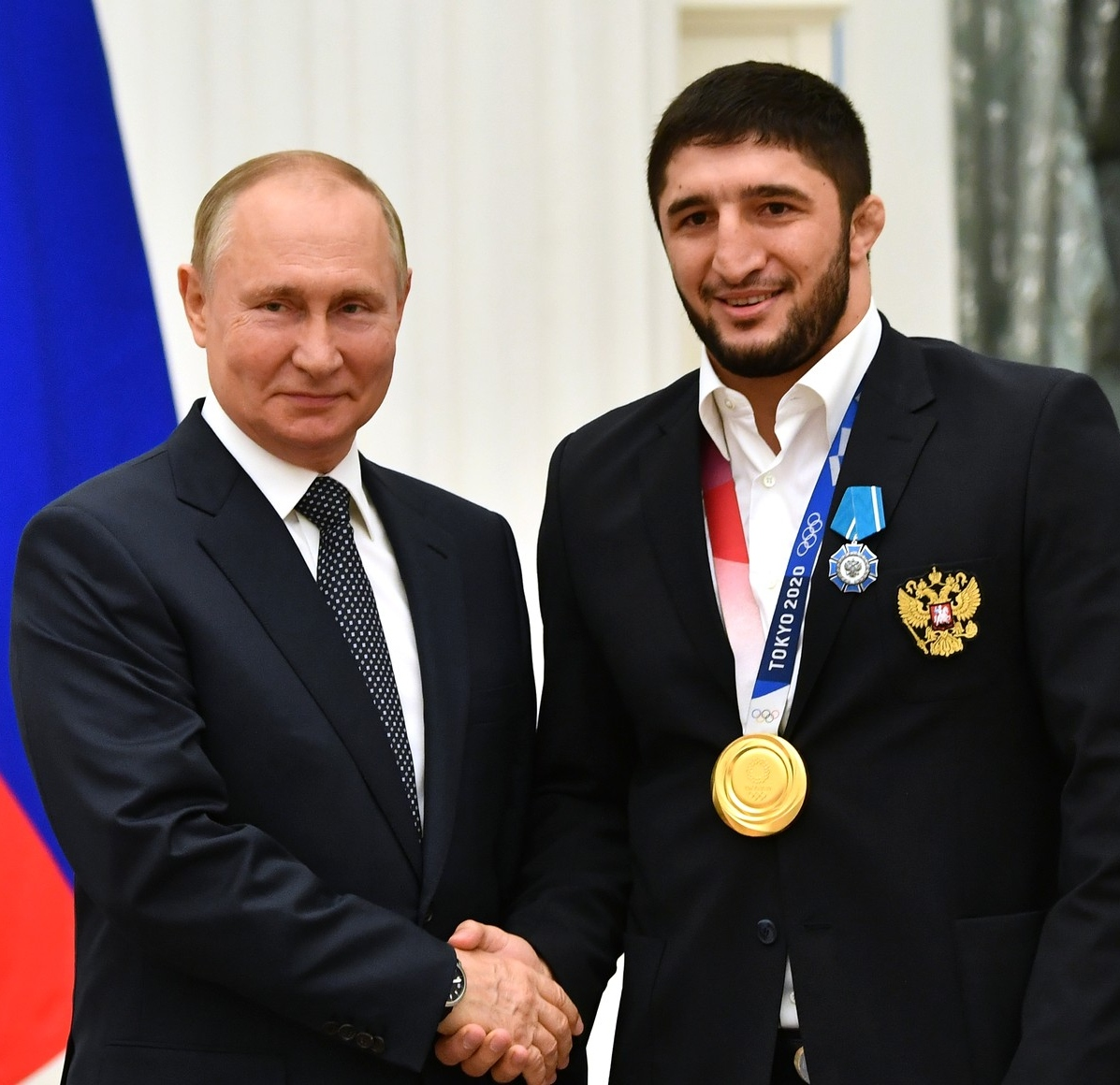
Sadulaev receives the Order of Honour from Vladimir Putin in 2021

- Order of Honour (11 September 2021)
- Master of Sports of International Class (25 March 2019)
- Hero of Dagestan (18 November 2018)
- Master of Sports (17 October 2016)
- Order of Friendship (25 August 2016)
- Order of Merit for the Republic of Dagestan (26 August 2016)
- Order of Honour "Al-Fakhr" (26 August 2016)
- Merited Master of Sports (11 April 2016)
- Master of Sports of International Class (5 August 2015)
- Master of Sports of International Class (18 September 2014)

In June 2015, Sadulaev was voted best Russian sportsman of June at the TV project "Golden Pedestal" (on the now-defunct Rossiya 2), earning 55.6% of votes and trumping Aliya Mustafina, who got 44.4% of votes.
