= 2026 European Wrestling Championships – Men's freestyle 97 kg =

Wrestling competition

Men's freestyle 97 kg at the 2026 European Wrestling Championships
- Venue: Tirana Olympic Park
- Location: Tirana, Albania
- Dates: 24-25 April
- Competitors: 15

Medalists
gold medal	Abdulrashid Sadulaev
silver medal	Batyrbek Tsakulov	Slovakia
bronze medal	Akhmed Magamaev	Bulgaria
bronze medal	Givi Matcharashvili	Georgia

The men's freestyle 97 kg is a competition featured at the 2026 European Wrestling Championships, and was held in Tirana, Albania on April 24 and 25.

== Results ==
Legend

- F — Won by fall

=== Main bracket ===
Round of 16
Theodoros Kyriakidis (GRE)	2
Aliaksandr Hushtyn (UWW)	4
Ben Honis (ITA)	2
Radu Lefter (MDA)	11
Benjamin Greil (AUT)	0
Abdulrashid Sadulaev (UWW)	10
Richárd Végh (HUN)	0
Batyrbek Tsakulov (SVK)	10
Redjep Hajdari (MKD)	0
Denys Sahaliuk (UKR)	5
Givi Matcharashvili (GEO)	3
Osman Nurmagomedov (AZE)	2
Rıfat Gıdak (TUR)	4
Zbigniew Baranowski (POL)	13

Quarterfinals
Akhmed Magamaev (BUL)	4
Aliaksandr Hushtyn (UWW)	1
Radu Lefter (MDA)	0
Abdulrashid Sadulaev (UWW)	10
Batyrbek Tsakulov (SVK)	5
Denys Sahaliuk (UKR)	2
Givi Matcharashvili (GEO)	2
Zbigniew Baranowski (POL)	1

Semifinals
Akhmed Magamaev (BUL)	2
Abdulrashid Sadulaev (UWW)	12
Batyrbek Tsakulov (SVK)	12
Givi Matcharashvili (GEO)	1

Final
Abdulrashid Sadulaev (UWW)	14
Batyrbek Tsakulov (SVK)	3

=== Repechage ===
Repechage round 1
Benjamin Greil (AUT)	2
Radu Lefter (MDA)	12
Richárd Végh (HUN)	6
Denys Sahaliuk (UKR)	3

Bronze medal matches
Radu Lefter (MDA)	2
Akhmed Magamaev (BUL)	4^{F}
Richárd Végh (HUN)	3
Givi Matcharashvili (GEO)	5

== Final standing ==
Rank	Athlete
1st place, gold medalist(s)	Abdulrashid Sadulaev (UWW)
2nd place, silver medalist(s)	Batyrbek Tsakulov (SVK)
3rd place, bronze medalist(s)	Akhmed Magamaev (BUL)
3rd place, bronze medalist(s)	Givi Matcharashvili (GEO)
5	Radu Lefter (MDA)
5	Richárd Végh (HUN)
7	Denys Sahaliuk (UKR)
8	Zbigniew Baranowski (POL)
9	Aliaksandr Hushtyn (UWW)
10	Rıfat Gıdak (TUR)
11	Osman Nurmagomedov (AZE)
12	Theodoros Kyriakidis (GRE)
13	Ben Honis (ITA)
14	Benjamin Greil (AUT)
15	Redjep Hajdari (MKD)
