= 2021 European Wrestling Championships – Men's freestyle 92 kg =

Wrestling competition

The men's freestyle 92 kg is a competition featured at the 2021 European Wrestling Championships, and was held in Warsaw, Poland on April 20 and April 21.

== Medalists ==
Gold	Magomed Kurbanov; Russia
Silver	Samuel Scherrer; Switzerland
Bronze	Hajy Rajabau; Belarus
Bronze	Osman Nurmagomedov; Azerbaijan

== Results ==
Legend

- F — Won by fall

Round of 16
Radosław Marcinkiewicz (POL)	2
Erhan Yaylacı (TUR)	2
Andriy Vlasov (UKR)	0
Magomed Kurbanov (RUS)	8
Irakli Mtsituri (GEO)	2
Akhmed Magamaev (BUL)	5
Osman Nurmagomedov (AZE)	10
Robin Ferdinand (GER)	4

Quarterfinals
Hajy Rajabau (BLR)	3
Georgii Rubaev (MDA)	2
Samuel Scherrer (SUI)	6
Ivars Samušonoks (LAT)	3
Radosław Marcinkiewicz (POL)	0
Magomed Kurbanov (RUS)	8
Akhmed Magamaev (BUL)	2
Osman Nurmagomedov (AZE)	7

Semifinals
Hajy Rajabau (BLR)	4
Samuel Scherrer (SUI)	5
Magomed Kurbanov (RUS)	6
Osman Nurmagomedov (AZE)	3

Final
Samuel Scherrer (SUI)	1
Magomed Kurbanov (RUS)	4

Repechage round 1
Andriy Vlasov (UKR)	4
Radosław Marcinkiewicz (POL)	2

Bronze medal match
Ivars Samušonoks (LAT)	0
Hajy Rajabau (BLR)	8
Andriy Vlasov (UKR)	0
Osman Nurmagomedov (AZE)	5

== Final standing ==
Rank	Athlete
1st place, gold medalist(s)	Magomed Kurbanov (RUS)
2nd place, silver medalist(s)	Samuel Scherrer (SUI)
3rd place, bronze medalist(s)	Hajy Rajabau (BLR)
3rd place, bronze medalist(s)	Osman Nurmagomedov (AZE)
5	Ivars Samušonoks (LAT)
5	Andriy Vlasov (UKR)
7	Akhmed Magamaev (BUL)
8	Radosław Marcinkiewicz (POL)
9	Robin Ferdinand (GER)
10	Erhan Yaylacı (TUR)
11	Georgii Rubaev (MDA)
12	Irakli Mtsituri (GEO)
