= 2020 Individual Wrestling World Cup – Men's freestyle 97 kg =

The men's freestyle 97 kilograms is a competition featured at the 2020 Individual Wrestling World Cup, and was held in Belgrade, Serbia on 17 and 18 December 2020.

== Medalists ==
Gold	Abdulrashid Sadulaev; Russia
Silver	Aliaksandr Hushtyn; Belarus
Bronze	Akhmed Bataev; Bulgaria
Bronze	Süleyman Karadeniz; Turkey

== Results ==
Legend

- F — Won by fall
- WO — Won by walkover

1/8 finals
Abraham Conyedo (ITA)	0
Valeriy Andriytsev (UKR)	3
Satyawart Kadian (IND)	1
Ertugrul Ağca (GER)	4
Abdulrashid Sadulaev (RUS)	8
Süleyman Karadeniz (TUR)	0
Michael Manea (ROU)	0
Radosław Baran (POL)	9

Quarterfinals
Shamil Zubairov (AZE)	8
Şamhan Jabrailov (MDA)	1
Akhmed Bataev (BUL)	0
Aliaksandr Hushtyn (BLR)	3
Valeriy Andriytsev (UKR)	5
Ertugrul Ağca (GER)	0
Abdulrashid Sadulaev (RUS)	12
Radosław Baran (POL)	2

Semifinals
Shamil Zubairov (AZE)	0
Aliaksandr Hushtyn (BLR)	8
Valeriy Andriytsev (UKR)	1
Abdulrashid Sadulaev (RUS)	12

Final
Aliaksandr Hushtyn (BLR)
Abdulrashid Sadulaev (RUS)	WO

Repechage round 1
Süleyman Karadeniz (TUR)	10
Radosław Baran (POL)	5

Bronze medals
Akhmed Bataev (BUL)	8
Shamil Zubairov (AZE)	1
Süleyman Karadeniz (TUR)	2
Valeriy Andriytsev (UKR)	1
