= 2021 European Wrestling Championships – Men's freestyle 97 kg =

Wrestling competition

The men's freestyle 97 kg is a competition featured at the 2021 European Wrestling Championships, and was held in Warsaw, Poland on April 19 and April 20.

== Medalists ==
Gold	Alikhan Zhabrailov; Russia
Silver	Süleyman Karadeniz; Turkey
Bronze	Radosław Baran; Poland
Bronze	Elizbar Odikadze; Georgia

== Results ==
Legend

- F — Won by fall
- WO — Won by walkover

Round of 16
Lukas Krasauskas (LTU)	0
Murazi Mchedlidze (UKR)	7
Süleyman Karadeniz (TUR)	10
Radu Lefter (MDA)	0
Shamil Zubairov (AZE)	WO
Albert Saritov (ROU)
Magomedgaji Nurov (MKD)	0
Elizbar Odikadze (GEO)	5^{F}
Aliaksandr Hushtyn (BLR)	5
Abraham Conyedo (ITA)	0

Quarterfinals
Radosław Baran (POL)	5
Akhmed Bataev (BUL)	3
Alikhan Zhabrailov (RUS)	13
Murazi Mchedlidze (UKR)	0
Süleyman Karadeniz (TUR)	6
Shamil Zubairov (AZE)	4
Elizbar Odikadze (GEO)	2
Aliaksandr Hushtyn (BLR)	2

Semifinals
Radosław Baran (POL)	3
Alikhan Zhabrailov (RUS)	3
Süleyman Karadeniz (TUR)	7
Elizbar Odikadze (GEO)	5

Final
Alikhan Zhabrailov (RUS)	6
Süleyman Karadeniz (TUR)	4

Repechage round 1
Radu Lefter (MDA)	9
Shamil Zubairov (AZE)	14

Bronze medal match
Murazi Mchedlidze (UKR)	1
Radosław Baran (POL)	8
Shamil Zubairov (AZE)	0
Elizbar Odikadze (GEO)	5^{F}

== Final standing ==
Rank	Athlete
1st place, gold medalist(s)	Alikhan Zhabrailov (RUS)
2nd place, silver medalist(s)	Süleyman Karadeniz (TUR)
3rd place, bronze medalist(s)	Radosław Baran (POL)
3rd place, bronze medalist(s)	Elizbar Odikadze (GEO)
5	Murazi Mchedlidze (UKR)
5	Shamil Zubairov (AZE)
7	Aliaksandr Hushtyn (BLR)
8	Radu Lefter (MDA)
9	Akhmed Bataev (BUL)
10	Albert Saritov (ROU)
11	Magomedgaji Nurov (MKD)
12	Abraham Conyedo (ITA)
13	Lukas Krasauskas (LTU)
