= 2019 European Wrestling Championships – Men's freestyle 92 kg =

The men's freestyle 92 kg is a competition featured at the 2019 European Wrestling Championships, and was held in Bucharest, Romania on April 9 and April 10.

== Medalists ==
Gold	Sharif Sharifov; Azerbaijan
Silver	Zbigniew Baranowski; Poland
Bronze	Irakli Mtsituri; Georgia
Bronze	István Veréb; Hungary

== Results ==
Legend

- F — Won by fall

=== Main Bracket ===
Round of 16
Akhmed Magamaev (BUL)	5
Hajy Rajabau (BLR)	4
Dominic Peter (AUT)	0
İbrahim Bölükbaşı (TUR)	6
Egor Olar (MDA)	0
Bohdan Hrytsay (UKR)	10
István Veréb (HUN)	2
Zbigniew Baranowski (POL)	7

Quarterfinals
Adrian Recorean (ROU)	0
Irakli Mtsituri (GEO)	7
Magomed Kurbanov (RUS)	2
Sharif Sharifov (AZE)	6
Akhmed Magamaev (BUL)	0
İbrahim Bölükbaşı (TUR)	6
Bohdan Hrytsay (UKR)	2
Zbigniew Baranowski (POL)	11

Semifinals
Irakli Mtsituri (GEO)	2
Sharif Sharifov (AZE)	8
İbrahim Bölükbaşı (TUR)	5
Zbigniew Baranowski (POL)	6

Final
Sharif Sharifov (AZE)	9
Zbigniew Baranowski (POL)	1

=== Repechage ===
Repechage round 1
István Veréb (HUN)	9
Bohdan Hrytsay (UKR)	2

Bronze medal match
Magomed Kurbanov (RUS)	3
Irakli Mtsituri (GEO)	3
István Veréb (HUN)	4
İbrahim Bölükbaşı (TUR)	2
