= 2020 European Wrestling Championships – Men's freestyle 92 kg =

Wrestling competition

The men's freestyle 92 kg is a competition featured at the 2020 European Wrestling Championships, and was held in Rome, Italy on February 15 and February 16.

== Medalists ==
Gold	Süleyman Karadeniz; Turkey
Silver	Samuel Scherrer; Switzerland
Bronze	Amarhajy Mahamedau; Belarus
Bronze	Aslanbek Alborov; Azerbaijan

== Results ==
Legend

- F — Won by fall

1/8 finals
Roman Rychko (UKR)	2
Marzpet Galstyan (ARM)	15
Aslanbek Alborov (AZE)	11
Bendegúz Tóth (HUN)	0
Süleyman Karadeniz (TUR)	10
Simone Iannattoni (ITA)	0
Batyrbek Tsakulov (RUS)	4
Gheorghe Rubaev (MDA)	6
Edon Shala (KOS)	0
Irakli Mtsituri (GEO)	12

Quarterfinals
Samuel Scherrer (SUI)	3
Amarhajy Mahamedau (BLR)	1
Angelos Kouklaris (GRE)	0
Marzpet Galstyan (ARM)	10
Aslanbek Alborov (AZE)	1
Süleyman Karadeniz (TUR)	11
Gheorghe Rubaev (MDA)	5
Irakli Mtsituri (GEO)	7

Semifinals
Samuel Scherrer (SUI)	7
Marzpet Galstyan (ARM)	0
Süleyman Karadeniz (TUR)	6^{F}
Irakli Mtsituri (GEO)	1

Final
Samuel Scherrer (SUI)	0
Süleyman Karadeniz (TUR)	3

Repechage round
Simone Iannattoni (ITA)	0
Aslanbek Alborov (AZE)	11

Bronze medal match
Amarhajy Mahamedau (BLR)	7
Marzpet Galstyan (ARM)	1
Aslanbek Alborov (AZE)	2
Irakli Mtsituri (GEO)	0

== Final standing ==
Rank	Athlete
1st place, gold medalist(s)	Süleyman Karadeniz (TUR)
2nd place, silver medalist(s)	Samuel Scherrer (SUI)
3rd place, bronze medalist(s)	Amarhajy Mahamedau (BLR)
3rd place, bronze medalist(s)	Aslanbek Alborov (AZE)
5	Marzpet Galstyan (ARM)
5	Irakli Mtsituri (GEO)
7	Gheorghe Rubaev (MDA)
8	Batyrbek Tsakulov (RUS)
9	Roman Rychko (UKR)
10	Angelos Kouklaris (GRE)
11	Bendegúz Tóth (HUN)
12	Edon Shala (KOS)
13	Simone Iannattoni (ITA)
