= 2021 World Wrestling Championships – Men's freestyle 97 kg =

Wrestling competitions

Men's freestyle 97 kg at the 2021 World Championships
- Venue: Nye Jordal Amfi
- Dates: 4–5 October 2021
- Competitors: 22 from 22 nations

Medalists
gold medal	Abdulrashid Sadulaev	RWF
silver medal	Kyle Snyder	United States
bronze medal	Mahamed Zakariiev	Ukraine
bronze medal	Mojtaba Goleij	Iran

The men's freestyle 97 kilograms is a competition featured at the 2021 World Wrestling Championships, and was held in Oslo, Norway on 4 and 5 October.

This freestyle wrestling competition consists of a single-elimination tournament, with a repechage used to determine the winner of two bronze medals. The two finalists face off for gold and silver medals. Each wrestler who loses to one of the two finalists moves into the repechage, culminating in a pair of bronze medal matches featuring the semifinal losers each facing the remaining repechage opponent from their half of the bracket.

== Results ==
Legend

- F — Won by fall

=== Final ===
Final
Abdulrashid Sadulaev (RWF)	6
Kyle Snyder (USA)	0

=== Top half ===
Round of 32

Round of 16
Abdulrashid Sadulaev (RWF)	10
Takashi Ishiguro (JPN)	0
Islam Ilyasov (AZE)	3
Aliaksandr Hushtyn (BLR)	4
Mahamed Zakariiev (UKR)	10
Maxwell Lacey (CRC)	3
Sumir Kumar Sah (NEP)	0
Süleyman Karadeniz (TUR)	10

Quarterfinals
Abdulrashid Sadulaev (RWF)	9
Aliaksandr Hushtyn (BLR)	4
Mahamed Zakariiev (UKR)	6
Süleyman Karadeniz (TUR)	3

Semifinals
Abdulrashid Sadulaev (RWF)	11
Mahamed Zakariiev (UKR)	0

=== Bottom half ===
Round of 32
Seo Min-won (KOR)	6
Satyawart Kadian (IND)	6
Mojtaba Goleij (IRI)	4
Elizbar Odikadze (GEO)	0
Radu Lefter (MDA)	9^{F}
Dan Cheptai (KEN)	0
Magomedgaji Nurov (MKD)	17
Lukas Krasauskas (LTU)	6
Radosław Baran (POL)	4
Akhmed Bataev (BUL)	2
Ölziisaikhany Batzul (MGL)	10
Nishan Randhawa (CAN)	0

Round of 16
Alisher Yergali (KAZ)	10
Seo Min-won (KOR)	0
Mojtaba Goleij (IRI)	10
Radu Lefter (MDA)	0
Magomedgaji Nurov (MKD)	3
Radosław Baran (POL)	1
Ölziisaikhany Batzul (MGL)	4
Kyle Snyder (USA)	14

Quarterfinals
Alisher Yergali (KAZ)	1
Mojtaba Goleij (IRI)	6
Magomedgaji Nurov (MKD)	0
Kyle Snyder (USA)	11

Semifinals
Mojtaba Goleij (IRI)	2
Kyle Snyder (USA)	3

=== Repechage ===
Repechage round 2
Takashi Ishiguro (JPN)	4
Aliaksandr Hushtyn (BLR)	5
Ölziisaikhany Batzul (MGL)	6
Magomedgaji Nurov (MKD)	0

Bronze medals
Aliaksandr Hushtyn (BLR)	3
Mahamed Zakariiev (UKR)	9
Ölziisaikhany Batzul (MGL)	0
Mojtaba Goleij (IRI)	10

== Final standing ==
Rank	Athlete
1st place, gold medalist(s)	Abdulrashid Sadulaev (RWF)
2nd place, silver medalist(s)	Kyle Snyder (USA)
3rd place, bronze medalist(s)	Mahamed Zakariiev (UKR)
3rd place, bronze medalist(s)	Mojtaba Goleij (IRI)
5	Aliaksandr Hushtyn (BLR)
5	Ölziisaikhany Batzul (MGL)
7	Magomedgaji Nurov (MKD)
8	Radu Lefter (MDA)
9	Süleyman Karadeniz (TUR)
10	Alisher Yergali (KAZ)
11	Seo Min-won (KOR)
12	Radosław Baran (POL)
13	Satyawart Kadian (IND)
14	Lukas Krasauskas (LTU)
15	Takashi Ishiguro (JPN)
16	Islam Ilyasov (AZE)
17	Maxwell Lacey (CRC)
18	Akhmed Bataev (BUL)
19	Elizbar Odikadze (GEO)
20	Dan Cheptai (KEN)
21	Sumir Kumar Sah (NEP)
22	Nishan Randhawa (CAN)
