= Golden Grand Prix Ivan Yarygin 2018 – Men's freestyle 92 kg =

The men's freestyle 92 kg is a competition featured at the Golden Grand Prix Ivan Yarygin 2018, and was held in Krasnoyarsk, Russia, on 28 January.

== Medalists ==
Gold
Silver
Bronze

== Results ==
Legend

- F — Won by fall

=== Final ===
Final
(Dagestan) Abdulrashid Sadulaev	6
(Kabardino-Balkaria) Anzor Urishev	0

=== Top half ===
- qualification: Yuri Belonovskiy of Krasnoyarsk Krai def. Akhmed Bataev of Chechnya (3–1)
- qualification: Anzor Urishev of Kabardino-Balkaria def. Guram Chartekoev of Crimea (10–0)

==== Section 1 ====
Qualification
(United States) Nicholas Heflin	10
(Kazakhstan) Beka Jvaridze	0
(Kabardino-Balkaria) Anzor Urishev	10
(Turkmenistan) Azat Gadzhiev	0
(Mongolia) Bat Bayasgalan	0
(Turkey) Serda Boke	10
(Krasnoyarsk Krai) Yuri Belonovskiy	10
(Georgia (country)) Nodar Egadze	0
(Mongolia) Ulziisaikhan Baasantsogt	6
(United States) Jake Varner	6

Quarterfinals
(Mongolia) Turtogtokh Luvsandorj	0
(Dagestan) Abdulrashid Sadulaev	10
(Kazakhstan) Abdimanap Baigenzheyev	8
(United States) Nicholas Heflin	14
(Kabardino-Balkaria) Anzor Urishev	10
(Turkey) Serda Boke	0
(Krasnoyarsk Krai) Yuri Belonovskiy	10
(United States) Jake Varner	0

Semifinals
(Dagestan) Abdulrashid Sadulaev	10
(United States) Nicholas Heflin	0
(Kabardino-Balkaria) Anzor Urishev	6
(Krasnoyarsk Krai) Yuri Belonovskiy	4

Final
-
-

== Repechage ==
Repechage round 1
-
-
-
-

Repechage round 2
-
-
(Turkmenistan) Azat Gadzhiev
(Turkey) Serda Boke	WO

Bronze medals
(Mongolia) Turtogtokh Luvsandorj	4
(United States) Nicholas Heflin	2
(Turkey) Serda Boke	3
(Krasnoyarsk Krai) Yuri Belonovskiy	9
