= 2020 Individual Wrestling World Cup – Men's freestyle 92 kg =

The men's freestyle 92 kilograms is a competition featured at the 2020 Individual Wrestling World Cup, and was held in Belgrade, Serbia on 16 and 17 December 2020.

== Medalists ==
Gold	Alikhan Zhabrailov; Russia
Silver	Georgii Rubaev; Moldova
Bronze	Samuel Scherrer; Switzerland
Bronze	Erhan Yaylacı; Turkey

== Results ==
Legend

- F — Won by fall

1/8 finals
Georgii Rubaev (MDA)	4
Erhan Yaylacı (TUR)	2
Gadzhimurad Magomedsaidov (AZE)	11
Strahinja Despić (SRB)	0
Alejandro Cañada (ESP)	5
Ilja Matuhin (GER)	2

Quarterfinals
Alikhan Zhabrailov (RUS)	7
Samuel Scherrer (SUI)	2
Arkadzi Pahasian (BLR)	8
Vasyl Sova (UKR)	2
Mihai Palaghia (ROU)	0
Georgii Rubaev (MDA)	11
Gadzhimurad Magomedsaidov (AZE)	5
Alejandro Cañada (ESP)	2

Semifinals
Alikhan Zhabrailov (RUS)	10
Arkadzi Pahasian (BLR)	0
Georgii Rubaev (MDA)	5
Gadzhimurad Magomedsaidov (AZE)	5

Final
Alikhan Zhabrailov (RUS)	6
Georgii Rubaev (MDA)	0

Repechage round 1
Erhan Yaylacı (TUR)	12
Mihai Palaghia (ROU)	2

Bronze medals
Samuel Scherrer (SUI)	8
Arkadzi Pahasian (BLR)	4
Erhan Yaylacı (TUR)	4
Gadzhimurad Magomedsaidov (AZE)	2
