= 2025 European Wrestling Championships – Men's freestyle 97 kg =

Wrestling competition

Men's freestyle 97 kg at the 2025 European Wrestling Championships
- Venue: X-Bionic Sphere
- Location: Bratislava, Slovakia
- Dates: 7-8 April
- Competitors: 13

Medalists
| gold medal | Givi Matcharashvili | Georgia |
| silver medal | Magomed Kurbanov |
| bronze medal | Richárd Végh | Hungary |
| bronze medal | Batyrbek Tsakulov | Slovakia |

The men's freestyle 97 kg is a competition featured at the 2025 European Wrestling Championships, and was held in Bratislava, Slovakia on April 7 and 8.

== Results ==
Legend

- F — Won by fall

=== Main bracket ===
Round of 16
Ertuğrul Ağca (GER) | 1
Radosław Baran (POL) | 4
Abubakr Abakarov (AZE) | 9^{F}
Vasyl Sova (UKR) | 5
Nikolaos Karavanos (GRE) | 0
Richárd Végh (HUN) | 11
Magomed Kurbanov (UWW) | 10
Gurgen Simonyan (ARM) | 0
Aliaksandr Hushtyn (UWW) | 5
Resul Güne (TUR) | 2

Quarterfinals
Givi Matcharashvili (GEO) | 11
Radosław Baran (POL) | 0
Abubakr Abakarov (AZE) | 2
Richárd Végh (HUN) | 5
Batyrbek Tsakulov (SVK) | 1
Magomed Kurbanov (UWW) | 9
Aliaksandr Hushtyn (UWW) | 2
Radu Lefter (MDA) | 7

Semifinals
Givi Matcharashvili (GEO) | 10
Richárd Végh (HUN) | 0
Magomed Kurbanov (UWW) | 5
Radu Lefter (MDA) | 2

Final
Givi Matcharashvili (GEO) | 3
Magomed Kurbanov (UWW) | 2

=== Repechage ===
Repechage round 1
Gurgen Simonyan (ARM) | 0
Batyrbek Tsakulov (SVK) | 10

Bronze medal match
Radosław Baran (POL) | 6
Richárd Végh (HUN) | 10
Batyrbek Tsakulov (SVK) | 11
Radu Lefter (MDA) | 0

== Final standing ==
| Rank | Athlete |
|---|---|
| 1st place, gold medalist(s) | Givi Matcharashvili (GEO) |
| 2nd place, silver medalist(s) | Magomed Kurbanov (UWW) |
| 3rd place, bronze medalist(s) | Richárd Végh (HUN) |
| 3rd place, bronze medalist(s) | Batyrbek Tsakulov (SVK) |
| 5 | Radosław Baran (POL) |
| 5 | Radu Lefter (MDA) |
| 7 | Abubakr Abakarov (AZE) |
| 8 | Aliaksandr Hushtyn (UWW) |
| 9 | Resul Güne (TUR) |
| 10 | Ertuğrul Ağca (GER) |
| 11 | Vasyl Sova (UKR) |
| 12 | Nikolaos Karavanos (GRE) |
| 13 | Gurgen Simonyan (ARM) |
