= 2022 World Wrestling Championships – Men's freestyle 97 kg =

Wrestling competitions

Men's freestyle 97 kg at the 2022 World Championships
- Venue: Štark Arena
- Dates: 17–18 September 2022
- Competitors: 23 from 23 nations

Medalists
gold medal	Kyle Snyder	United States
silver medal	Batyrbek Tsakulov	Slovakia
bronze medal	Magomedkhan Magomedov	Azerbaijan
bronze medal	Givi Matcharashvili	Georgia

The men's freestyle 97 kilograms is a competition featured at the 2022 World Wrestling Championships, and was held in Belgrade, Serbia on 17 and 18 September 2022.

This freestyle wrestling competition consists of a single-elimination tournament, with a repechage used to determine the winner of two bronze medals. The two finalists face off for gold and silver medals. Each wrestler who loses to one of the two finalists moves into the repechage, culminating in a pair of bronze medal matches featuring the semifinal losers each facing the remaining repechage opponent from their half of the bracket.

== Results ==
Legend

- F — Won by fall
- R — Retired

=== Final ===
Final
Kyle Snyder (USA)	6
Batyrbek Tsakulov (SVK)	0

=== Top half ===
Round of 32
Nishan Randhawa (CAN)	0
Erik Thiele (GER)	10
Vicky Chahar (IND)	2
Samuel Scherrer (SUI)	2
Ulrich Manouan (CIV)	0
Şamhan Jabrailov (MDA)	10

Round of 16
Kyle Snyder (USA)	4
Zbigniew Baranowski (POL)	1
Erik Thiele (GER)	4
Magomedkhan Magomedov (AZE)	11
Mohammad Hossein Mohammadian (IRI)	10
Samuel Scherrer (SUI)	0
Şamhan Jabrailov (MDA)	1^{R}
Mahamed Zakariiev (UKR)	4

Quarterfinals
Kyle Snyder (USA)	10
Magomedkhan Magomedov (AZE)	0
Mohammad Hossein Mohammadian (IRI)	8
Mahamed Zakariiev (UKR)	5

Semifinals
Kyle Snyder (USA)	4
Mohammad Hossein Mohammadian (IRI)	1

=== Bottom half ===
Round of 32
Vladislav Baitsaev (HUN)	5
Seo Min-won (KOR)	0
Takashi Ishiguro (JPN)	5
Mücahit Çelik (TUR)	6
Lukas Krasauskas (LTU)	0
Givi Matcharashvili (GEO)	10
Ben Honis (ITA)	4
Muheite Tuerxunbieke (CHN)	6

Round of 16
Ölziisaikhany Batzul (MGL)	0
Vladislav Baitsaev (HUN)	6
Mücahit Çelik (TUR)	0
Batyrbek Tsakulov (SVK)	10
Mamed Ibragimov (KAZ)	2
Givi Matcharashvili (GEO)	8
Muheite Tuerxunbieke (CHN)	4
Magomedgaji Nurov (MKD)	14

Quarterfinals
Vladislav Baitsaev (HUN)	2
Batyrbek Tsakulov (SVK)	4
Givi Matcharashvili (GEO)	6
Magomedgaji Nurov (MKD)	4

Semifinals
Batyrbek Tsakulov (SVK)	10
Givi Matcharashvili (GEO)	0

=== Repechage ===
Repechage round 2
Zbigniew Baranowski (POL)	0
Magomedkhan Magomedov (AZE)	11
Mücahit Çelik (TUR)	0
Vladislav Baitsaev (HUN)	11

Bronze medals
Magomedkhan Magomedov (AZE)	6^{F}
Mohammad Hossein Mohammadian (IRI)	4
Vladislav Baitsaev (HUN)	3
Givi Matcharashvili (GEO)	5

== Final standing ==
Rank	Athlete
1st place, gold medalist(s)	Kyle Snyder (USA)
2nd place, silver medalist(s)	Batyrbek Tsakulov (SVK)
3rd place, bronze medalist(s)	Magomedkhan Magomedov (AZE)
3rd place, bronze medalist(s)	Givi Matcharashvili (GEO)
5	Mohammad Hossein Mohammadian (IRI)
5	Vladislav Baitsaev (HUN)
7	Mahamed Zakariiev (UKR)
8	Magomedgaji Nurov (MKD)
9	Erik Thiele (GER)
10	Şamhan Jabrailov (MDA)
11	Muheite Tuerxunbieke (CHN)
12	Mücahit Çelik (TUR)
13	Samuel Scherrer (SUI)
14	Takashi Ishiguro (JPN)
15	Ben Honis (ITA)
16	Vicky Chahar (IND)
17	Mamed Ibragimov (KAZ)
18	Zbigniew Baranowski (POL)
19	Seo Min-won (KOR)
20	Ölziisaikhany Batzul (MGL)
21	Nishan Randhawa (CAN)
22	Ulrich Manouan (CIV)
23	Lukas Krasauskas (LTU)
