= Samuel Scherrer =

Swiss freestyle wrestler

Personal information
- Born: 15 March 1997 (age 29)
- Height: 184 cm (6 ft 0 in)

Sport
- Country: Switzerland
- Sport: Amateur wrestling
- Weight class: 92 kg
- Event: Freestyle
Medal record
Men's freestyle wrestling
Representing Switzerland
Individual World Cup
Bronze medal – third place	2020 Belgrade	92 kg
European Championships
Silver medal – second place	2020 Rome	92 kg
Silver medal – second place	2021 Warsaw	92 kg
Dan Kolov & Nikola Petrov Tournament
Bronze medal – third place	2026 Plovdiv	92 kg

Samuel Scherrer (born 15 March 1997) is a Swiss freestyle wrestler. He is a two-time silver medalist at the European Wrestling Championships. He also won a bronze medal at the 2020 Individual Wrestling World Cup held in Belgrade, Serbia.

== Career ==
In 2020, Scherrer won the silver medal in the 92 kg event at the European Wrestling Championships held in Rome, Italy. In the final, he lost against Süleyman Karadeniz of Turkey.

In the same year, Scherrer also won one of the bronze medals in the men's 92 kg event at the 2020 Individual Wrestling World Cup held in Belgrade, Serbia. In March 2021, he competed at the European Qualification Tournament in Budapest, Hungary hoping to qualify for the 2020 Summer Olympics in Tokyo, Japan. He was eliminated in his first match by Radosław Baran of Poland. A month later, Scherrer won the silver medal in the men's 92 kg event at the 2021 European Wrestling Championships held in Warsaw, Poland. In May 2021, he also failed to qualify for the Olympics at the World Olympic Qualification Tournament held in Sofia, Bulgaria.

Scherrer competed in the 97 kg event at the 2022 World Wrestling Championships held in Belgrade, Serbia. He also competed at the 2023 Dan Kolov & Nikola Petrov Tournament in Sofia, Bulgaria and in the 97 kg event at the 2023 European Wrestling Championships held in Zagreb, Croatia. In the same year, Scherrer also competed in the 97 kg event at the World Wrestling Championships held in Belgrade, Serbia.

Scherrer competed at the 2024 European Wrestling Olympic Qualification Tournament in Baku, Azerbaijan hoping to qualify for the 2024 Summer Olympics in Paris, France. He was eliminated in his first match and he did not qualify for the Olympics. Scherrer also competed at the 2024 World Wrestling Olympic Qualification Tournament held in Istanbul, Turkey without qualifying for the Olympics.

== Achievements ==
Year	Tournament	Venue	Result	Event
2020	European Championships	Rome, Italy	2nd	Freestyle 92 kg
2021	European Championships	Warsaw, Poland	2nd	Freestyle 92 kg
