= 2022 European Wrestling Championships – Men's freestyle 97 kg =

Wrestling competition

Men's freestyle 97 kg at the 2022 European Wrestling Championships
- Venue: BOK Sports Hall
- Location: Budapest, Hungary
- Dates: 28-29 March
- Competitors: 11

Medalists
gold medal	Magomedkhan Magomedov	Azerbaijan
silver medal	Vladislav Baitcaev	Hungary
bronze medal	Batyrbek Tsakulov	Slovakia
bronze medal	Zbigniew Baranowski	Poland

The men's freestyle 97 kg was a competition featured at the 2022 European Wrestling Championships, and was held in Budapest, Hungary on March 28 and 29.

== Results ==
Legend

- F — Won by fall

=== Main Bracket ===
1/8 finals
Vladislav Baitcaev (HUN)	3
Batyrbek Tsakulov (SVK)	1
Magomedkhan Magomedov (AZE)	12
Lukas Krasauskas (LTU)	2
Zbigniew Baranowski (POL)	10
Alejandro Cañada (ESP)	0

Quarterfinals
Magomedgadji Nurov (MKD)	4
Vladislav Baitcaev (HUN)	6
Erik Thiele (GER)	4
Burak Şahin (TUR)	2
Elizbar Odikadze (GEO)	7
Magomedkhan Magomedov (AZE)	14
Zbigniew Baranowski (POL)	10
Radu Lefter (MDA)	0

Semifinals
Vladislav Baitcaev (HUN)	8
Erik Thiele (GER)	1
Magomedkhan Magomedov (AZE)	6
Zbigniew Baranowski (POL)	4

Final
Vladislav Baitcaev (HUN)	5
Magomedkhan Magomedov (AZE)	11

=== Repechage ===
Repechage round 1
Batyrbek Tsakulov (SVK)	5
Magomedgadji Nurov (MKD)	0
Lukas Krasauskas (LTU)	0
Elizbar Odikadze (GEO)	10

Bronze medal match
Batyrbek Tsakulov (SVK)	7
Erik Thiele (GER)	0
Elizbar Odikadze (GEO)	2
Zbigniew Baranowski (POL)	4

== Final standing ==
Rank	Wrestler	UWW Points
1st place, gold medalist(s)	Magomedkhan Magomedov (AZE)	10000
2nd place, silver medalist(s)	Vladislav Baitcaev (HUN)	8000
3rd place, bronze medalist(s)	Batyrbek Tsakulov (SVK)	6500
3rd place, bronze medalist(s)	Zbigniew Baranowski (POL)	6500
5	Elizbar Odikadze (GEO)	5000
5	Erik Thiele (GER)	5000
7	Magomedgadji Nurov (MKD)	4400
8	Burak Şahin (TUR)	4000
9	Lukas Krasauskas (LTU)	3500
10	Radu Lefter (MDA)	3100
11	Alejandro Cañada (ESP)	1000
