= Mahamed Zakariiev =

Ukrainian freestyle wrestler

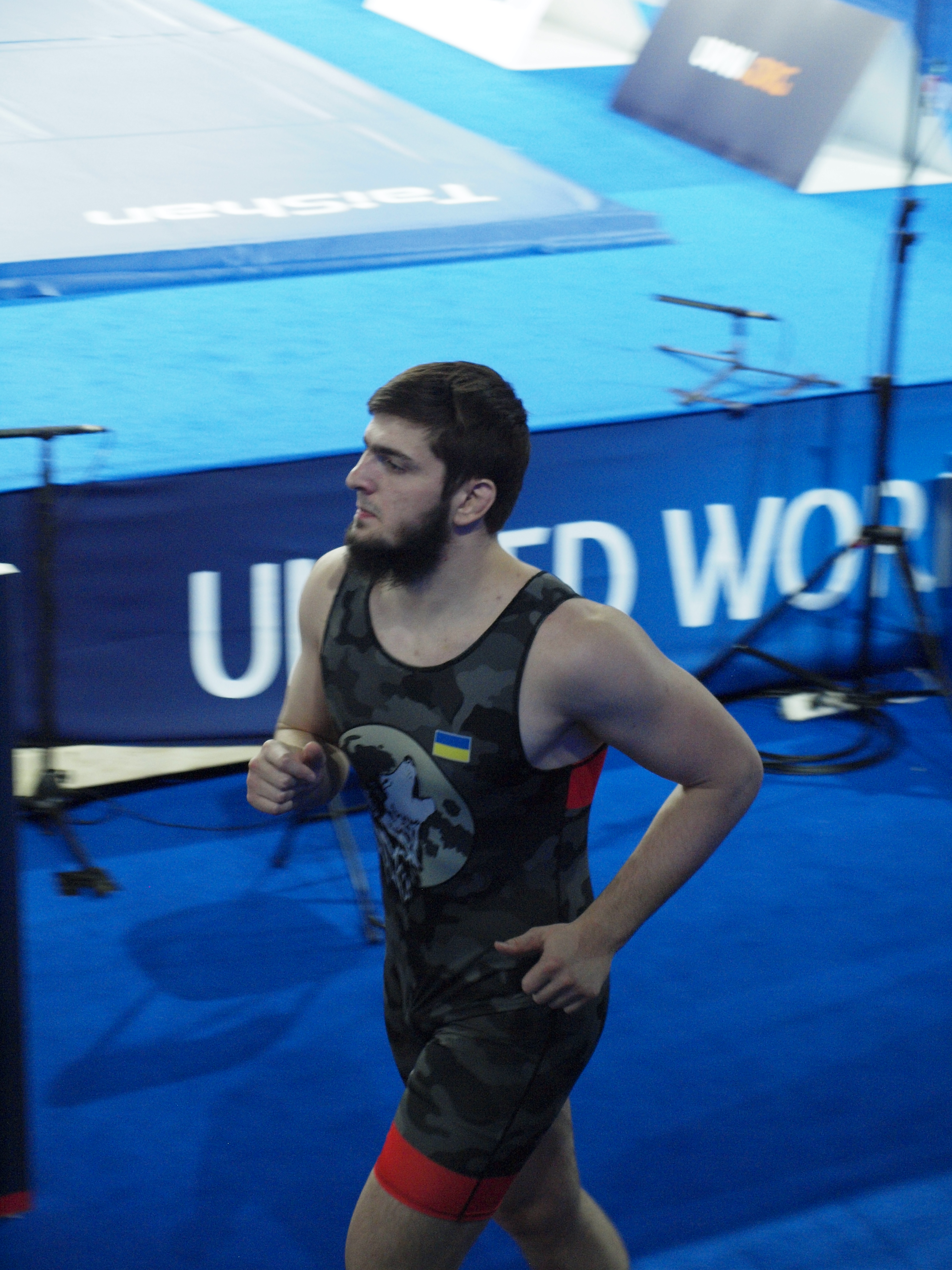
- Mahamed Zakariiev at the 2021 World Wrestling Championships in Oslo, Norway

Personal information
- Native name: Магомед Ахмедович Закариев
- Nationality: Ukraine
- Born: 19 July 1997 (age 29) Chechnya, Russia
- Home town: Grozny, Chechnya, Russia
- Height: 187 cm (6 ft 2 in)
- Weight: 97 kg (214 lb)

Sport
- Country: Ukraine
- Sport: Amateur wrestling
- Weight class: 97 kg
- Event: Freestyle
Medal record
Men's freestyle wrestling
Representing Ukraine
World Championships
Bronze medal – third place	2021 Oslo	97 kg
Dan Kolov & Nikola Petrov Tournament
Bronze medal – third place	2023 Sofia	97 kg

Mahamed Zakariiev is a Russian and Ukrainian freestyle wrestler. He won one of the bronze medals in the men's 97 kg event at the 2021 World Wrestling Championships held in Oslo, Norway.

He competed in the 97 kg event at the 2022 World Wrestling Championships held in Belgrade, Serbia.
