= Erhan Yaylacı =

Turkish freestyle wrestler

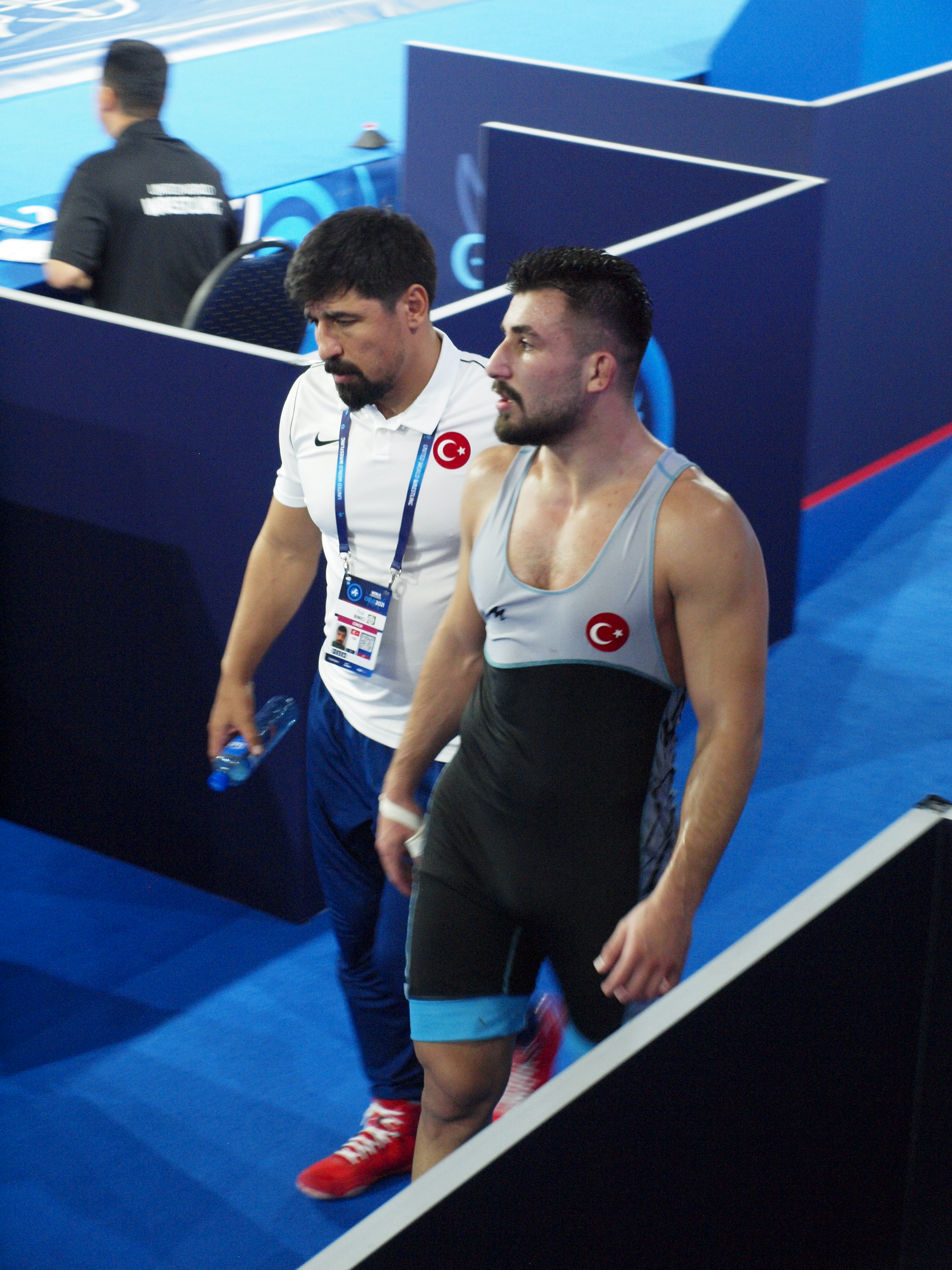

Personal information
- Full name: Erhan Yaylacı
- Born: August 29, 1998 (age 27) Tokat
- Education: Niğde Ömer Halisdemir University
- Height: 1.85 m (6 ft 1 in)
- Weight: 92 kg (203 lb; 14.5 st)

Sport
- Country: Türkiye
- Sport: Amateur wrestling
- Weight class: 92 kg
- Event: Freestyle
- Club: Istanbul BB SK
Medal record
Men's freestyle wrestling
Representing Turkey
Individual World Cup
Bronze medal – third place	2020 Belgrade	92 kg
Islamic Solidarity Games
Silver medal – second place	2021 Konya	92 kg
Yasar Dogu Tournament
Silver medal – second place	2022 Istanbul	92 kg
Silver medal – second place	2021 Istanbul	92 kg
World U23 Championships
Bronze medal – third place	2021 Belgrade	92 kg
European U23 Championship
Gold medal – first place	2021 Skopje	92 kg
Bronze medal – third place	2019 Novi Sad	92 kg
World Juniors Championships
Bronze medal – third place	2018 Trnava	92 kg
European Juniors Championships
Bronze medal – third place	2018 Dortmund	92 kg

Erhan Yaylacı (born August 29, 1998) is a Turkish freestyle wrestler competing in the 92 kg division. He is a member of İstanbul Büyükşehir Belediyesi S.K.

== Career ==
In 2020, he won the bronze medal in the men's 92 kg event at the 2020 Individual Wrestling World Cup held in Belgrade, Serbia.

In 2021, he won the gold medal in the men's 92 kg event at the 2021 European U23 Wrestling Championship held in Skopje, North Macedonia.

In 2022, he won the bronze medal in his event at the Matteo Pellicone Ranking Series 2022 held in Rome, Italy. He won the silver medal in the men's 92 kg event at the 2021 Islamic Solidarity Games held in Konya, Turkey.

== Achievements ==
Year	Tournament	Location	Result	Event
2020	Individual World Cup	Budapest, Hungary	3rd	Freestyle 92 kg
2022	Islamic Solidarity Games	Konya, Türkiye	2nd	Freestyle 92 kg
