= Magomed Kurbanov (wrestler) =

Russian freestyle wrestler

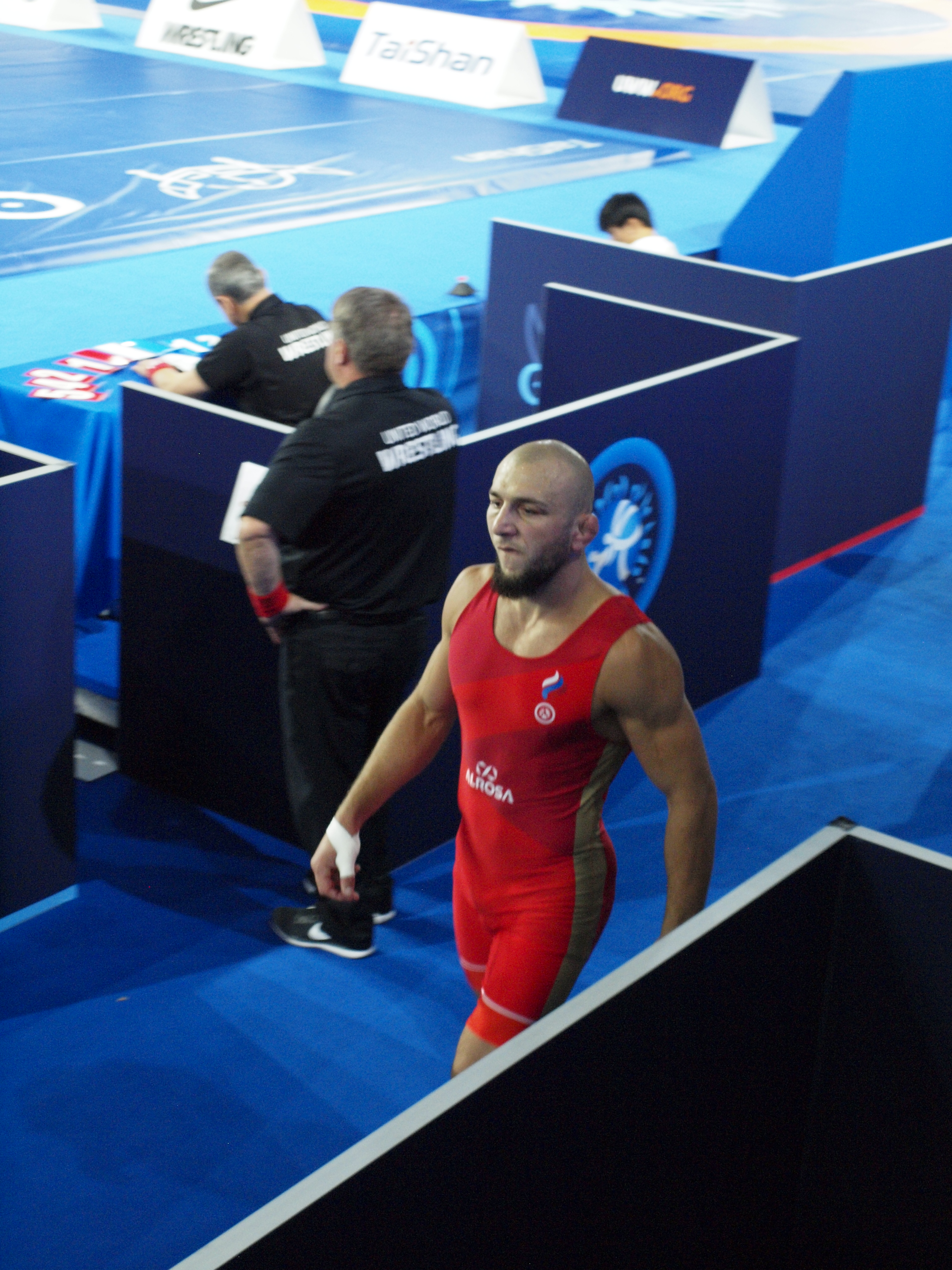
- Magomed Kurbanov at the 2021 World Wrestling Championships in Oslo, Norway

Personal information
- Native name: Магомед Курбанов
- National team: Russia
- Born: 2 August 1993 (age 33) Zibirkhali, Dagestan, Russia
- Weight: 97 kg (214 lb)

Sport
- Country: Russia
- Sport: Amateur wrestling
- Event: Freestyle
- Coached by: Gadzhi Rashidov
Medal record
Men's freestyle wrestling
Representing UWW
European Championships
Silver medal – second place	2025 Bratislava	97 kg
Representing Individual Neutral Athletes
European Championships
Bronze medal – third place	2024 Bucharest	92 kg
Representing Russian Wrestling Federation
World Championships
Silver medal – second place	2021 Oslo	92 kg
Representing Russia
European Championships
Gold medal – first place	2021 Warsaw	92 kg
Representing Dagestan
Golden Grand Prix Ivan Yarygin
Gold medal – first place	2019 Krasnoyarsk	92 kg
Gold medal – first place	2023 Krasnoyarsk	97 kg
Gold medal – first place	2024 Krasnoyarsk	92 kg
Gold medal – first place	2025 Krasnoyarsk	97 kg
Silver medal – second place	2026 Krasnoyarsk	97 kg
Russian National Championships
Gold medal – first place	2021 Ulan-Ude	92 kg
Gold medal – first place	2022 Kyzyl	92 kg
Silver medal – second place	2019 Sochi	92 kg
Silver medal – second place	2020 Naro-Fominsk	92 kg
Silver medal – second place	2023 Kaspiysk	97 kg
Silver medal – second place	2025 Moscow	97 kg

Magomed Guseynovich Kurbanov (Russian: Магомед Гусейнович Курбанов; born 8 February 1993) is a Russian freestyle wrestler.

== Career ==
Magomed Kurbanov won the silver medal in the men's 92 kg event at the 2021 World Wrestling Championships held in Oslo, Norway. In 2021, he also won the gold medal in the men's 92 kg event at the European Wrestling Championships held in Warsaw, Poland. He is also a three-time medalist at the Russian National Freestyle Wrestling Championships.

He won one of the bronze medals in the men's 92 kg event at the 2024 European Wrestling Championships held in Bucharest, Romania. He defeated Denys Sahaliuk of Ukraine in his bronze medal match.

== Achievements ==
Year	Tournament	Venue	Result	Event
2021	European Championships	Warsaw, Poland	1st	Freestyle 92 kg
2021	World Championships	Oslo, Norway	2nd	Freestyle 92 kg
2024	European Championships	Bucharest, Romania	3rd	Freestyle 92 kg
2025	European Championships	Bratislava, Slovakia	2nd	Freestyle 97 kg
