= Shamil Zubairov =

Azerbaijani freestyle wrestler

Personal information
- National team: Azerbaijan
- Born: Dagestan, Russia
- Weight: 92 kg (203 lb)

Sport
- Country: Azerbaijan
- Sport: Amateur wrestling
- Event: Freestyle
Medal record
Men's freestyle wrestling
Representing Azerbaijan
U23 World Championships
Gold medal – first place	2018 Bucharest	92 kg
U23 European Championships
Bronze medal – third place	2019 Novi Sad	92 kg
Gold medal – first place	2018 Istanbul	92 kg

Shamil Zubairov is an Azerbaijani freestyle wrestler who currently competes at 92 kilograms. In 2018, Zubairov went on to become the World and European Champion in the U23 level. In 2019, he once again medaled at the U23 European Championship.

== Major results ==
Year	Competition	Venue	Position	Event	Notes
Representing Azerbaijan
2018	U23 World Championships	Bucharest, Romania	1st	Freestyle 92 kg	
2018	U23 European Championships	Istanbul, Turkey	1st	Freestyle 92 kg	
2019	U23 European Championships	Novi Sad, Serbia	3rd	Freestyle 92 kg	
