= Zbigniew Baranowski =

Polish wrestler (born 1991)

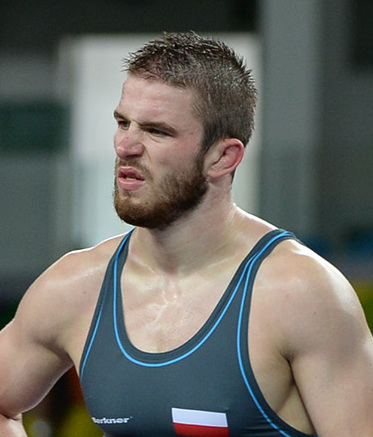
- Baranowski at the 2016 Olympics

Personal information
- Born: 2 July 1991 (age 35) Białogard, Poland

Sport
- Sport: Wrestling
- Event: Freestyle Wrestling
Medal record
Men's freestyle wrestling
Representing Poland
European Championships
Silver medal – second place	2019 Bucharest	92 kg
Bronze medal – third place	2022 Budapest	97 kg
World Cup
Silver medal – second place	2020 Belgrade	86 kg
World Military Championships
Gold medal – first place	2025 Warendorf	97 kg
Grand Prix
Gold medal – first place	2023 Warsaw	97 kg
Silver medal – second place	2025 Budapest	97 kg

Zbigniew Baranowski (born 2 July 1991 in Białogard) is a Polish wrestler who competed at the 2016 Summer Olympics.

He took silver at the 2016 Dan Kolov & Nikola Petrov international wrestling tournament.

At the 2016 World Wrestling Olympic Qualification Tournament 1 he lost in the quarterfinals to eventual winner J'den Cox. However, due to Cox making the finals, he was able to compete in the Repechage where he won both a bronze medal and the final Olympic qualifying spot in the tournament 4–3.

He has been ranked as high as 19th in the world.

In 2020, he won the silver medal in the men's 86 kg event at the Individual Wrestling World Cup held in Belgrade, Serbia.

In 2022, Baranowski won one of the bronze medals in the 97 kg event at the European Wrestling Championships held in Budapest, Hungary. He competed in the 97 kg event at the 2022 World Wrestling Championships held in Belgrade, Serbia.

Baranowski earned a quota place for Poland for the 2024 Summer Olympics at the 2024 World Wrestling Olympic Qualification Tournament held in Istanbul, Turkey.
