= Batyrbek Tsakulov =

Russian freestyle wrestler (born 1998)

Personal information
- Full name: Batyrbek Kazbekovich Tsakulov
- Nationality: Russia; Slovakia
- Born: Батырбек Казбекович Цакулов; October 20, 1998 (age 27) North Ossetia-Alania, Russia
- Home town: Vladikavkaz, North Ossetia-Alania, Russia
- Height: 187 cm (6 ft 2 in)

Sport
- Country: Russia; Slovakia (since 2022)
- Sport: Sport wrestling
- Weight class: 97 kg
- Event: Freestyle
- Coached by: Dzhambolat Olisaev, Kazbek Dedegkaev, Dzhambolat Tedeyev

Achievements and titles
- World finals: (silver) (2022)
- Regional finals: (bronze) (2022)
Medal record
Men's freestyle wrestling
Representing Slovakia
World Championships
Silver medal – second place	2022 Belgrade	97 kg
Bronze medal – third place	2024 Tirana	92 kg
European Championships
Bronze medal – third place	2022 Budapest	97 kg
Bronze medal – third place	2025 Bratislava	97 kg
Grand Prix
Gold medal – first place	2023 Alexandria	97 kg
Gold medal – first place	2022 Almaty	97 kg
Gold medal – first place	2022 Rome	97 kg
Representing All-World Team
World Cup
Bronze medal – third place	2022 Coralville	Team
Representing Russia
World U23 Championships
Silver medal – second place	2019 Budapest	92 kg
European U23 Championships
Gold medal – first place	2019 Novi Sad	92 kg
Bronze medal – third place	2018 Istanbul	92 kg
World Cadets Championships
Gold medal – first place	2013 Zrenjanin	76 kg
Representing (North Ossetia–Alania) North Ossetia
Golden Grand Prix Ivan Yarygin
Gold medal – first place	2020 Krasnoyarsk	92 kg
Silver medal – second place	2019 Krasnoyarsk	92 kg
Russian National Championships
Gold medal – first place	2018 Odintsovo	92 kg
Bronze medal – third place	2019 Sochi	92 kg
Bronze medal – third place	2020 Naro-Fominsk	92 kg

Batyrbek Kazbekovich Tsakulov (Russian: Батырбек Казбекович Цакулов; Iron Ossetic: Цæкулаты Хъазыбеджы фырт Батырбег; born October 20, 1998) is a Russian-Slovak freestyle wrestler. He is a 2019 U23 World Championship finalist, 2020 Ivan Yarygin champion (finalist in 2019), 2019 U23 European Champion (bronze medalist in 2018) and 2018 Russian National Champion (bronze medalist in 2019).

== Major results ==
Year	Tournament	Location	Result	Event
2018	U23 European Championships	Istanbul, Turkey	3rd	Freestyle 92 kg
2018	Russian National Championships	Odintsovo, Russia	1st	Freestyle 92 kg
2018	World Championships	Budapest, Hungary	7th	Freestyle 92 kg
2019	Golden Grand Prix Ivan Yarygin	Krasnoyarsk, Russia	2nd	Freestyle 92 kg
2019	Russian National Championships	Sochi, Russia	3rd	Freestyle 92 kg
2019	U23 World Championships	Budapest, Hungary	2nd	Freestyle 92 kg
2020	Golden Grand Prix Ivan Yarygin	Krasnoyarsk, Russia	1st	Freestyle 92 kg
2020	European Championships	Rome, Italy	8th	Freestyle 92 kg
2020	Russian National Championships	Naro-Fominsk, Russia	3rd	Freestyle 92 kg
2022	European Championships	Budapest, Hungary	3rd	Freestyle 97 kg
2022	World Championships	Belgrade, Serbia	2nd	Freestyle 97 kg
