= Süleyman Karadeniz =

Turkish freestyle wrestler

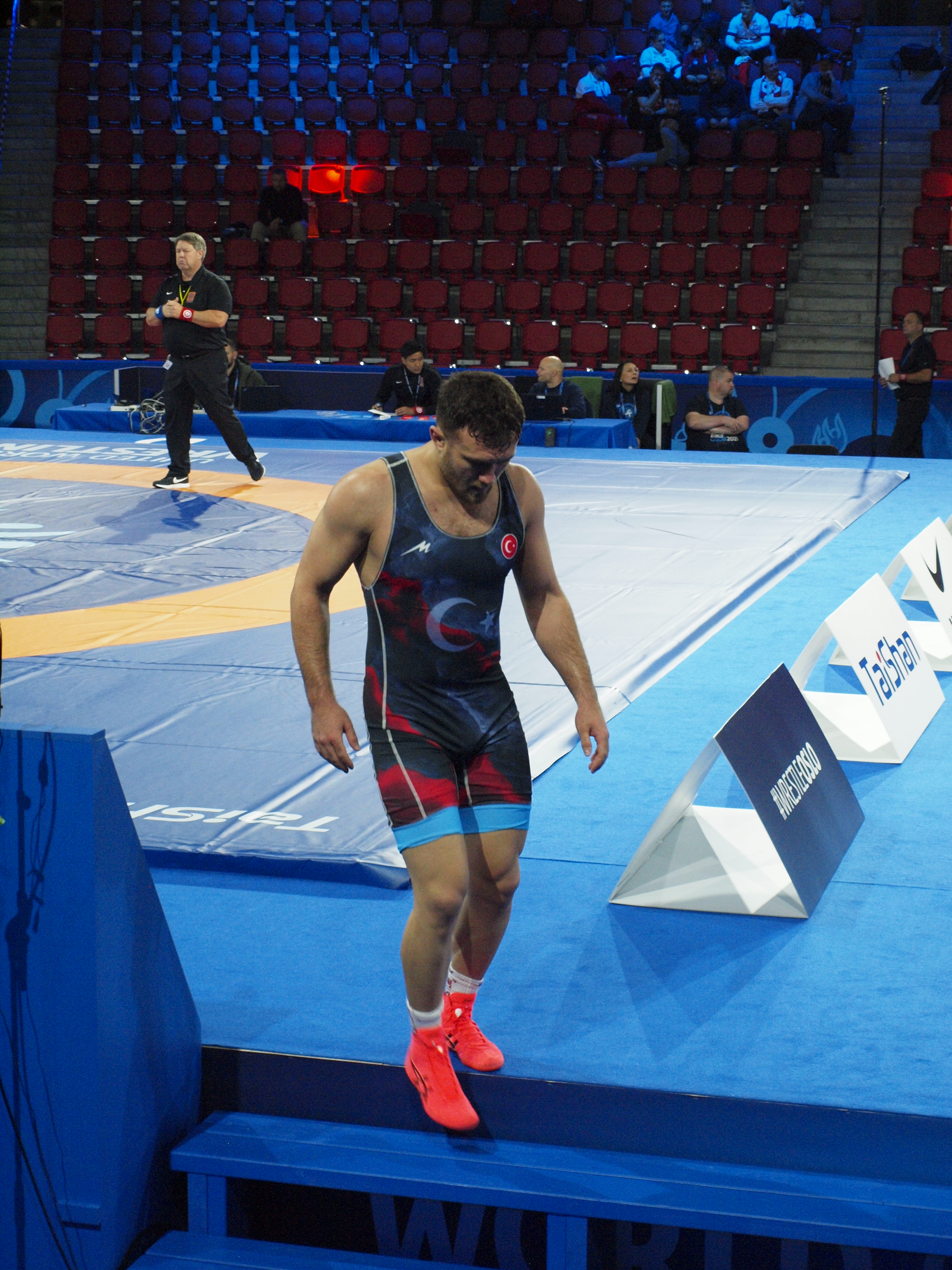
- Karadeniz at the 2021 World Wrestling Championships in Oslo, Norway

Personal information
- Full name: Süleyman Mustafa Karadeniz
- Born: 12 July 1995 (age 31) Denizli, Turkey

Sport
- Country: Turkey
- Sport: Amateur wrestling
- Event: Freestyle
Medal record
Men's freestyle wrestling
Representing Turkey
European Championships
Gold medal – first place	2020 Rome	92 kg
Silver medal – second place	2021 Warsaw	97 kg
Individual World Cup
Bronze medal – third place	2020 Belgrade	97 kg
Yasar Dogu Tournament
Bronze medal – third place	2019 Istanbul	92 kg
Bronze medal – third place	2026 Antalya	92 kg
Grand Prix
Gold medal – first place	2019 Warsaw	97 kg
Gold medal – first place	2020 Warsaw	97 kg
Gold medal – first place	2021 Kiev	97 kg
Gold medal – first place	2025 Grozny	97 kg
Silver medal – second place	2017 Tbilisi	97 kg
Bronze medal – third place	2017 Bucharest	97 kg
Bronze medal – third place	2019 Kiev	97 kg

Süleyman Karadeniz (born 12 July 1995) is a Turkish freestyle wrestler. He won the gold medal in the 92 kg event at the 2020 European Wrestling Championships held in Rome, Italy.

== Career ==
In 2019, Karadeniz competed in the men's freestyle event of the 2019 Wrestling World Cup. In the same year, he also competed at the 2019 World Wrestling Championships held in Nur-Sultan, Kazakhstan in the 92 kg event without winning a medal. He won his first match against Shamil Zubairov of Azerbaijan but lost his next match against Alikhan Zhabrailov of Russia. Zhabrailov went on to win one of the bronze medals.

In 2020, Karadeniz won one of the bronze medals in the men's 97 kg event at the Individual Wrestling World Cup held in Belgrade, Serbia. In March 2021, he qualified at the European Qualification Tournament to compete at the 2020 Summer Olympics in Tokyo, Japan. A month later, he secured the silver medal in the 97 kg event at the 2021 European Wrestling Championships held in Warsaw, Poland.

At the 2025 Akhmat Kadyrov Memorial Tournament held in Grozny, Russia, he defeated his Dagestani opponent Shamil-Imam Gadzhaliev 2–1 to win the gold medal.

== Achievements ==
Year	Tournament	Venue	Result	Event
2020	European Championships	Rome, Italy	1st	Freestyle 92 kg
2021	European Championships	Warsaw, Poland	2nd	Freestyle 97 kg
