= Irakli Mtsituri =

Georgian freestyle wrestler

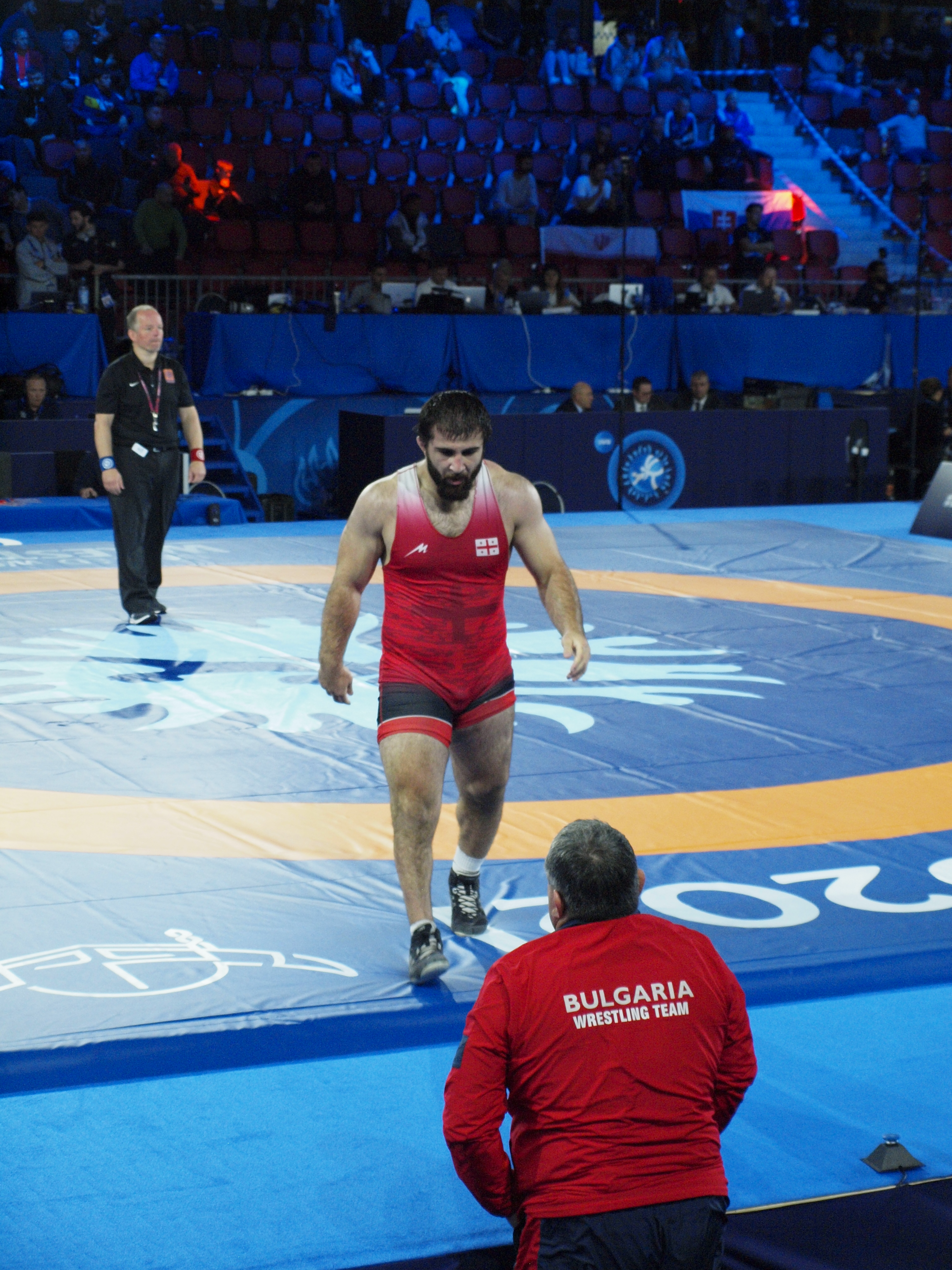
- Irakli Mtsituri at the 2021 World Wrestling Championships in Oslo, Norway

Personal information
- Born: 13 August 1995 (age 30)
- Height: 171 cm (5 ft 7 in)

Sport
- Country: Georgia
- Sport: Amateur wrestling
- Event: Freestyle
Medal record
Men's freestyle wrestling
Representing Georgia
World Championships
Bronze medal – third place	2019 Nur-Sultan	92 kg
European Championships
Bronze medal – third place	2019 Bucharest	92 kg
World U23 Championships
Bronze medal – third place	2017 Bydgoszcz	86 kg
European U23 Championship
Silver medal – second place	2018 Istanbul	92 kg

Irakli Mtsituri (Georgian: ირაკლი მწითური; born 13 August 1995) is a Georgian freestyle wrestler. In 2019, he won one of the bronze medals in the men's 92 kg event at the 2019 World Wrestling Championships held in Nur-Sultan, Kazakhstan. Earlier that year, he also won a bronze medal in the 92 kg event at the 2019 European Wrestling Championships held in Bucharest, Romania.

== Major results ==
Year	Tournament	Location	Result	Event
2019	European Championships	Bucharest, Romania	3rd	Freestyle 92 kg
2019	World Championships	Nur-Sultan, Kazakhstan	3rd	Freestyle 92 kg
