= Wrestling at the 2026 Asian Games – Men's freestyle 97 kg =

Men's freestyle 97 kg at the 2026 Asian Games
- Venue: Inae Sports Center
- Date: 3 October 2026
- Competitors: 14 from 14 nations

Medalists
gold medal	Amir Ali Azarpira	Iran
silver medal	Sherzod Poyonov	Uzbekistan
bronze medal	Deepak Punia	India
bronze medal	Arash Yoshida	Japan

The men's 97 kilograms freestyle wrestling competition at the 2026 Asian Games was held on 3 October 2026 at the Inae Sports Center in Nagoya. The event was competed by 14 competitors. Amir Ali Azarpira of Iran won the gold medal after defeating Sherzod Poyonov of Uzbekistan in the final. Deepak Punia of India and Arash Yoshida of Japan won the bronze medals.

== Background ==
Men's freestyle wrestling was first contested at the 1954 Asian Games in Manila. It has been contested at every edition of the Asian Games since then.

Bahrain's Akhmed Tazhudinov was the defending champion, having won the gold medal in the men's freestyle 97 kg event at the 2022 Asian Games in Hangzhou. He was also the reigning Olympic champion, having subsequently won the gold medal in the same weight category at the 2024 Summer Olympics. Mojtaba Goleij of Iran won the silver medal while China's Habila Awusayiman and Mongolia's Ganbaataryn Gankhuyag won the bronze medals. Apart from Ganbaataryn, none of the other medalists returned to take part in the 2026 edition.

Iran's Amir Ali Azarpira was the bronze medallist at the 2024 Summer Olympics. He also won the silver medal at the 2025 World Wrestling Championships, losing to Snyder in the final. He had also won the silver medal at the 2026 Asian Wrestling Championships in Bishkek, losing to Japan's Arash Yoshida in the final. Yoshida was a two-time Asian champion in the 97 kg category, having won gold medals at the 2025 and the 2026 Asian Wrestling Championships. He also won a bronze medal at the 2025 World Under-23 Wrestling Championships. Uzbekistan's Sherzod Poyonov was the bronze medalist in the 97 kg category at the 2026 Asian Wrestling Championships.

Kazakhstan's Rizabek Aitmukhan won the gold medal in the 92 kg category at the 2023 World Wrestling Championships and 2024 World Under-23 Wrestling Championships. He subsequently won silver medals in the 97 kg category at the 2024 and 2025 Asian Wrestling Championships, losing to Tazhudinov and Yoshida in the finals respectively. India's Deepak Punia was the silver medalist in the 86 kg category at the 2022 Asian Games in Hangzhou. He had also won a silver medal in the 86 kg category at the 2019 World Wrestling Championships. He moved on to compete in the higher weight class while Mukul Dahiya represented India in the 86 kg category.

== Format ==
The freestyle wrestling competition was competed as a single-elimination tournament. The two finalists competed against each other for the gold and silver medals. Each wrestler who loses to one of the two finalists moves into the repechage rounds, which is used to determine the bronze medals. The losers of the semifinals compete against the remaining repechage opponent from their half of the bracket in the bronze medal bout.

== Schedule ==
The men's freestyle 97 kg event was held on 3 October 2026 held at the Inae Sports Center in Nagoya.

All times are Japan Standard Time (UTC+09:00)

Date	Time	Event
Saturday, 3 October 2026	10:30	1/8 finals
Saturday, 3 October 2026	10:30	1/4 finals
Saturday, 3 October 2026	10:30	Semifinals
Saturday, 3 October 2026	10:30	Repechages
Saturday, 3 October 2026	18:00	Finals

== Summary ==
The event was competed by 14 competitors. Azarpira won his first two bouts by technical superiority to reach the semifinals, where he defeated Yoshida 4–3 via a takedown in the first period and two stepouts in the second period, to reach the final. Poyonov advanced to the final after defeating Magomed Sharipov of Bahrain in the qualifying round and Ganbaataryn of Mongolia in the quarterfinals, before overcoming Punia 9–8 in the semifinals.

In the final, Azarpira dominated Poyonov, and won ten straight points to secure a win through technical superiority. Azarpira scored most of his points through stepouts. Thus, Azarpira claimed the gold medal, while Poyonov settled for the silver medal.

Punia and Yoshida won the two bronze medals. Punia defeated Ganbaataryn 2–1 in his bronze-medal bout, He took a two point lead in the first period and defended it despite conceding a point in the second period. Yoshida defeated Şatlyk Hemelýäýew of Turkmenistan 12–1 in his bronze-medal match.

== Results ==
Legend

- F — Won by fall
- WO — Won by walkover

=== Main bracket ===
1/8 finals
Zhou Junpeng (CHN)	2
Deepak Punia (IND)	12
Sherzod Poyonov (UZB)	3
Magomed Sharipov (BRN)	3
Seo Ju-hwan (KOR)	0
Ganbaataryn Gankhuyag (MGL)	3
Rizabek Aitmukhan (KAZ)	WO
Ismail Kartoev (TJK)
Arash Yoshida (JPN)	10^{F}
Heng Rottha (CAM)	0
Amir Ali Azarpira (IRI)	10
Muhammad Gulzar (PAK)	0

1/4 finals
Vincent Li (HKG)
Deepak Punia (IND)	WO
Sherzod Poyonov (UZB)	2
Ganbaataryn Gankhuyag (MGL)	1
Rizabek Aitmukhan (KAZ)	1
Arash Yoshida (JPN)	11
Amir Ali Azarpira (IRI)	10
Şatlyk Hemelýäýew (TKM)	0

Semifinals
Deepak Punia (IND)	8
Sherzod Poyonov (UZB)	9
Arash Yoshida (JPN)	3
Amir Ali Azarpira (IRI)	4

Final
Sherzod Poyonov (UZB)	0
Amir Ali Azarpira (IRI)	10

=== Repechage ===
Repechage
Magomed Sharipov (BRN)	1
Ganbaataryn Gankhuyag (MGL)	3
Muhammad Gulzar (PAK)	0
Şatlyk Hemelýäýew (TKM)	12

Bronze medal matches
Ganbaataryn Gankhuyag (MGL)	1
Deepak Punia (IND)	2
Şatlyk Hemelýäýew (TKM)	1
Arash Yoshida (JPN)	12

== Final standing ==
Rank	Athlete
1st place, gold medalist(s)	Amir Ali Azarpira (IRI)
2nd place, silver medalist(s)	Sherzod Poyonov (UZB)
3rd place, bronze medalist(s)	Deepak Punia (IND)
3rd place, bronze medalist(s)	Arash Yoshida (JPN)
5	Ganbaataryn Gankhuyag (MGL)
5	Şatlyk Hemelýäýew (TKM)
7	Rizabek Aitmukhan (KAZ)
8	Magomed Sharipov (BRN)
9	Zhou Junpeng (CHN)
10	Seo Ju-hwan (KOR)
11	Heng Rottha (CAM)
12	Muhammad Gulzar (PAK)
—	Vincent Li (HKG)
—	Ismail Kartoev (TJK)
