= 2025 World Wrestling Championships – Men's freestyle 97 kg =

Wrestling competitions

Men's freestyle 97 kg at the 2025 World Championships
- Venue: Arena Zagreb
- Dates: 15–16 September 2025
- Competitors: 29 from 27 nations

Medalists
gold medal	Kyle Snyder	United States
silver medal	Amir Ali Azarpira	Iran
bronze medal	Akhmed Tazhudinov	Bahrain
bronze medal	Arash Yoshida	Japan

The men's freestyle 97 kilograms is a competition featured at the 2025 World Wrestling Championships, and was held in Zagreb, Croatia on 15 and 16 September 2025.

This freestyle wrestling competition consists of a single-elimination tournament, with a repechage used to determine the winner of two bronze medals. The two finalists face off for gold and silver medals. Each wrestler who loses to one of the two finalists moves into the repechage, culminating in a pair of bronze medal matches, featuring the semifinal losers each facing the remaining repechage opponent from their half of the bracket.

== Results ==
Legend

- F — Won by fall
- R — Retired

=== Final ===
Final
Amir Ali Azarpira (IRI)	2
Kyle Snyder (USA)	4

=== Top half ===
Round of 32
Nishan Randhawa (CAN)	3
Magomedgaji Nurov (MKD)	5
Rizabek Aitmukhan (KAZ)	4
Magomed Kurbanov (UWW)	5
Habila Awusayiman (CHN)	4
Richárd Végh (HUN)	7
Amir Ali Azarpira (IRI)	2
Ganbaataryn Gankhuyag (MGL)	2
Akhmed Magamaev (BUL)	7
Radu Lefter (MDA)	3
Aliaksandr Hushtyn (UWW)	6
Seo Ju-hwan (KOR)	5
Vicky Hooda (IND)	9
Magomedkhan Magomedov (AZE)	11^{R}

Round of 16
Akhmed Tazhudinov (BRN)	10
Magomedgaji Nurov (MKD)	0
Magomed Kurbanov (UWW)	8
Richárd Végh (HUN)	0
Amir Ali Azarpira (IRI)	6
Akhmed Magamaev (BUL)	3
Aliaksandr Hushtyn (UWW)	1
Vicky Hooda (IND)	11

Quarterfinals
Akhmed Tazhudinov (BRN)	10
Magomed Kurbanov (UWW)	9
Amir Ali Azarpira (IRI)	10
Vicky Hooda (IND)	0

Semifinals
Akhmed Tazhudinov (BRN)	2
Amir Ali Azarpira (IRI)	5

=== Bottom half ===
Round of 32
Adam Jakšík (SVK)	1
Cristian Sarco (VEN)	2
Arturo Silot (CUB)	6
Resul Güne (TUR)	4
David Mchedlidze (UKR)	3
Zbigniew Baranowski (POL)	5
Arash Yoshida (JPN)	7^{F}
Domantas Pauliuščenko (LTU)	0
Filip Huklek (CRO)	0
Ertuğrul Ağca (GER)	11
Şatlyk Hemelýäýew (TKM)	4
Adlan Viskhanov (FRA)	1

Round of 16
Kyle Snyder (USA)	10
Cristian Sarco (VEN)	0
Arturo Silot (CUB)	1
Zbigniew Baranowski (POL)	1
Arash Yoshida (JPN)	10
Ertuğrul Ağca (GER)	0
Şatlyk Hemelýäýew (TKM)	0
Givi Matcharashvili (GEO)	4

Quarterfinals
Kyle Snyder (USA)	5
Zbigniew Baranowski (POL)	0
Arash Yoshida (JPN)	6
Givi Matcharashvili (GEO)	2

Semifinals
Kyle Snyder (USA)	9
Arash Yoshida (JPN)	1

=== Repechage ===
Repechage round 1
Ganbaataryn Gankhuyag (MGL)	2
Akhmed Magamaev (BUL)	5

Repechage round 2
Akhmed Magamaev (BUL)	4^{F}
Vicky Hooda (IND)	0
Cristian Sarco (VEN)	1
Zbigniew Baranowski (POL)	6

Bronze medals
Akhmed Magamaev (BUL)	10
Akhmed Tazhudinov (BRN)	13
Zbigniew Baranowski (POL)	0
Arash Yoshida (JPN)	6

== Final standing ==
Rank	Athlete
1st place, gold medalist(s)	Kyle Snyder (USA)
2nd place, silver medalist(s)	Amir Ali Azarpira (IRI)
3rd place, bronze medalist(s)	Akhmed Tazhudinov (BRN)
3rd place, bronze medalist(s)	Arash Yoshida (JPN)
5	Akhmed Magamaev (BUL)
5	Zbigniew Baranowski (POL)
7	Vicky Hooda (IND)
8	Magomed Kurbanov (UWW)
9	Ertuğrul Ağca (GER)
10	Arturo Silot (CUB)
11	Aliaksandr Hushtyn (UWW)
12	Givi Matcharashvili (GEO)
13	Cristian Sarco (VEN)
14	Richárd Végh (HUN)
15	Magomedgaji Nurov (MKD)
16	Şatlyk Hemelýäýew (TKM)
17	Ganbaataryn Gankhuyag (MGL)
18	Seo Ju-hwan (KOR)
19	Rizabek Aitmukhan (KAZ)
20	Resul Güne (TUR)
21	Habila Awusayiman (CHN)
22	Nishan Randhawa (CAN)
23	David Mchedlidze (UKR)
24	Radu Lefter (MDA)
25	Adam Jakšík (SVK)
26	Adlan Viskhanov (FRA)
27	Magomedkhan Magomedov (AZE)
28	Domantas Pauliuščenko (LTU)
29	Filip Huklek (CRO)
