= 2026 World Wrestling Championships – Men's freestyle 97 kg =

Wrestling competitions

Men's freestyle 97 kg at the 2026 World Championships
- Venue: Barys Arena
- Dates: 29–30 October 2026
- Competitors: 29 from 29 nations

Medalists
gold medal	Kyle Snyder	United States
silver medal	Arash Yoshida	Japan
bronze medal	Abdulrashid Sadulaev	Russia
bronze medal	Hassan Yazdani	Iran

The men's freestyle 97 kilograms was a competition featured at the 2026 World Wrestling Championships, and was held in Astana, Kazakhstan on 29 and 30 October 2026.

This freestyle wrestling competition consists of a single-elimination tournament, with a repechage used to determine the winner of two bronze medals. The two finalists face off for gold and silver medals. Each wrestler who loses to one of the two finalists moves into the repechage, culminating in a pair of bronze medal matches, featuring the semifinal losers each facing the remaining repechage opponent from their half of the bracket.

== Results ==
Legend

- F — Won by fall
- WO — Won by walkover

=== Final ===
Final
Kyle Snyder (USA)	4
Arash Yoshida (JPN)	4

=== Top half ===
Round of 32
Alperen Tokgöz (TUR)	7
Tömörbaataryn Demchigdorj (MGL)	0
Batyrbek Tsakulov (SVK)	7
Gennadij Cudinovic (GER)	0
Rizabek Aitmukhan (KAZ)	1
Abdulrashid Sadulaev (RUS)	4
Zbigniew Baranowski (POL)	6
Harrison Onovwiomogbohwo (NGR)	1
Ben Honis (ITA)	7
Vasyl Sova (UKR)	10
Givi Matcharashvili (GEO)	12
Thomas Barns (AUS)	1
~~Triloki Yadav (NEP)~~
Akhmed Magamaev (BUL)	WO

Round of 16
Kyle Snyder (USA)	10
Alperen Tokgöz (TUR)	0
Batyrbek Tsakulov (SVK)	1
Abdulrashid Sadulaev (RUS)	10
Zbigniew Baranowski (POL)	10
Vasyl Sova (UKR)	0
Givi Matcharashvili (GEO)	5
Akhmed Magamaev (BUL)	4

Quarterfinals
Kyle Snyder (USA)	4
Abdulrashid Sadulaev (RUS)	4
Zbigniew Baranowski (POL)	8
Givi Matcharashvili (GEO)	3

Semifinals
Kyle Snyder (USA)	5
Zbigniew Baranowski (POL)	0

=== Bottom half ===
Round of 32
Hassan Yazdani (IRI)	11
Kim Pu-reun (KOR)	0
Radu Lefter (MDA)	10
Benjamin Greil (AUT)	3
Cristian Sarco (VEN)	2
Vicky Hooda (IND)	8
Richárd Végh (HUN)	3
Arturo Silot (CUB)	8
Magomedkhan Magomedov (AZE)	17
Aliaksandr Hushtyn (BLR)	7
Shao Pengfei (CHN)	2^{F}
Boymurod Azimov (UZB)	9

Round of 16
Arash Yoshida (JPN)	7
Hassan Yazdani (IRI)	5
Radu Lefter (MDA)	0
Vicky Hooda (IND)	10
Arturo Silot (CUB)	16
Magomedkhan Magomedov (AZE)	18
Shao Pengfei (CHN)	0
Akhmed Tazhudinov (BRN)	10

Quarterfinals
Arash Yoshida (JPN)	12
Vicky Hooda (IND)	2
Magomedkhan Magomedov (AZE)	7
Akhmed Tazhudinov (BRN)	12

Semifinals
Arash Yoshida (JPN)	3^{F}
Akhmed Tazhudinov (BRN)	6

=== Repechage ===
Repechage round 2
Alperen Tokgöz (TUR)	3
Abdulrashid Sadulaev (RUS)	7
Hassan Yazdani (IRI)	10
Vicky Hooda (IND)	0

Bronze medals
Abdulrashid Sadulaev (RUS)	5
Zbigniew Baranowski (POL)	0
Hassan Yazdani (IRI)	5
Akhmed Tazhudinov (BRN)	0

== Final standing ==
Rank	Athlete
1st place, gold medalist(s)	Kyle Snyder (USA)
2nd place, silver medalist(s)	Arash Yoshida (JPN)
3rd place, bronze medalist(s)	Abdulrashid Sadulaev (RUS)
3rd place, bronze medalist(s)	Hassan Yazdani (IRI)
5	Zbigniew Baranowski (POL)
5	Akhmed Tazhudinov (BRN)
7	Magomedkhan Magomedov (AZE)
8	Givi Matcharashvili (GEO)
9	Vicky Hooda (IND)
10	Akhmed Magamaev (BUL)
11	Shao Pengfei (CHN)
12	Arturo Silot (CUB)
13	Alperen Tokgöz (TUR)
14	Batyrbek Tsakulov (SVK)
15	Radu Lefter (MDA)
16	Vasyl Sova (UKR)
17	Ben Honis (ITA)
18	Aliaksandr Hushtyn (BLR)
19	Richárd Végh (HUN)
20	Benjamin Greil (AUT)
21	Cristian Sarco (VEN)
22	Rizabek Aitmukhan (KAZ)
23	Harrison Onovwiomogbohwo (NGR)
24	Thomas Barns (AUS)
25	Boymurod Azimov (UZB)
26	Tömörbaataryn Demchigdorj (MGL)
27	Gennadij Cudinovic (GER)
28	Kim Pu-reun (KOR)
—	Triloki Yadav (NEP)
