= 2023 Asian Wrestling Championships – Results =

These are the results of the 2023 Asian Wrestling Championships which took place between 9 and 14 April 2023 in Astana, Kazakhstan.

== Men's freestyle ==
=== 57 kg ===
13 April

Round of 16
Nodirjon Safarov (UZB)	11
Kim Sung-gwon (KOR)	7
Alireza Sarlak (IRI)	1
Rikuto Arai (JPN)	12
Almaz Smanbekov (KGZ)	WO
~~Muhammad Bilal (PAK)~~
Sunatullo Boboev (TJK)	8^{F}
Gayan Ekanayake (SRI)	2

Quarterfinals
Zou Wanhao (CHN)	3
Nodirjon Safarov (UZB)	0
Rikuto Arai (JPN)	1
Aman Sehrawat (IND)	7
Rakhat Kalzhan (KAZ)	2
Almaz Smanbekov (KGZ)	4
Sunatullo Boboev (TJK)	0
Zandanbudyn Zanabazar (MGL)	9

Semifinals
Zou Wanhao (CHN)	4
Aman Sehrawat (IND)	7
Almaz Smanbekov (KGZ)	8
Zandanbudyn Zanabazar (MGL)	6

Final
Aman Sehrawat (IND)	9
Almaz Smanbekov (KGZ)	4

Repechage round 1
~~Muhammad Bilal (PAK)~~
Rakhat Kalzhan (KAZ)	WO

Bronze medals
Rikuto Arai (JPN)	6
Zou Wanhao (CHN)	1
Rakhat Kalzhan (KAZ)	6
Zandanbudyn Zanabazar (MGL)	4

=== 61 kg ===
14 April

Round of 16
Sardor Ruzimov (UZB)	10
Ibrahim Guzan (YEM)	0
Muhamad Ikromov (TJK)
Liu Minghu (CHN)	WO
Tümenbilegiin Tüvshintulga (MGL)	3
Nurbolat Abdualiyev (KAZ)	1
Song Hyeon-sik (KOR)	10
Eddy Khidzer (SGP)	0
Kodai Ogawa (JPN)	10
Myrat Hojanepesow (TKM)	0

Quarterfinals
Pankaj Malik (IND)	2
Sardor Ruzimov (UZB)	4
Liu Minghu (CHN)	8
Tümenbilegiin Tüvshintulga (MGL)	1
Yasin Rezaei (IRI)	6^{F}
Song Hyeon-sik (KOR)	6
Kodai Ogawa (JPN)	1
Taiyrbek Zhumashbek Uulu (KGZ)	4

Semifinals
Sardor Ruzimov (UZB)	2
Liu Minghu (CHN)	8
Yasin Rezaei (IRI)	2
Taiyrbek Zhumashbek Uulu (KGZ)	11

Final
Liu Minghu (CHN)	2
Taiyrbek Zhumashbek Uulu (KGZ)	4

Repechage round 1
Muhamad Ikromov (TJK)
Tümenbilegiin Tüvshintulga (MGL)	WO

Bronze medals
Tümenbilegiin Tüvshintulga (MGL)	4
Sardor Ruzimov (UZB)	4
Kodai Ogawa (JPN)	4
Yasin Rezaei (IRI)	7

=== 65 kg ===
13 April

Round of 16
Sanzhar Mukhtar (KAZ)	5
Mohammed Al-Jawad (IRQ)	0
Kim Chang-su (KOR)	5
Gurbanmuhammet Çaryýew (TKM)	8
Abdulmazhid Kudiev (TJK)	2
Ryoma Anraku (JPN)	3
Umidjon Jalolov (UZB)	6^{F}
Charles Fernando (SRI)	0
Anuj Kumar (IND)	16
Yuan Shaohua (CHN)	5
Ulukbek Zholdoshbekov (KGZ)	WO
~~Chlovelle Van Adolfo (PHI)~~

Quarterfinals
Rahman Amouzad (IRI)	6
Sanzhar Mukhtar (KAZ)	0
Gurbanmuhammet Çaryýew (TKM)	1
Ryoma Anraku (JPN)	7
Umidjon Jalolov (UZB)	10
Anuj Kumar (IND)	0
Ulukbek Zholdoshbekov (KGZ)	0
Tömör-Ochiryn Tulga (MGL)	4

Semifinals
Rahman Amouzad (IRI)	2
Ryoma Anraku (JPN)	1
Umidjon Jalolov (UZB)	2
Tömör-Ochiryn Tulga (MGL)	5

Final
Rahman Amouzad (IRI)	3
Tömör-Ochiryn Tulga (MGL)	1

Bronze medals
Sanzhar Mukhtar (KAZ)	0
Ryoma Anraku (JPN)	10
Ulukbek Zholdoshbekov (KGZ)	2
Umidjon Jalolov (UZB)	2

=== 70 kg ===
13 April

Round of 16
Orozobek Toktomambetov (KGZ)	12
Perman Hommadow (TKM)	1
Sanzhar Doszhanov (KAZ)	11
Park Su-hyeon (KOR)	0
Qayyum Yusoff (SGP)	0
Mustafo Akhmedov (TJK)	10
~~Inayat Ullah (PAK)~~
Morteza Ghiasi (IRI)	WO
Zafarbek Otakhonov (UZB)	10
Mulayam Yadav (IND)	0
Gankhuyagiin Khanbürged (MGL)	9
Yoshinosuke Aoyagi (JPN)	19
Orts Isakov (JOR)	12^{F}
Ali Isam (IRQ)	4
Anil Munasinghe (SRI)	0
Agudamu (CHN)	10

Quarterfinals
Orozobek Toktomambetov (KGZ)	4
Sanzhar Doszhanov (KAZ)	4
Mustafo Akhmedov (TJK)	2
Morteza Ghiasi (IRI)	4
Zafarbek Otakhonov (UZB)	3
Yoshinosuke Aoyagi (JPN)	1
Orts Isakov (JOR)	20
Agudamu (CHN)	7

Semifinals
Sanzhar Doszhanov (KAZ)	4
Morteza Ghiasi (IRI)	1
Zafarbek Otakhonov (UZB)	10
Orts Isakov (JOR)	0

Final
Sanzhar Doszhanov (KAZ)	2
Zafarbek Otakhonov (UZB)	0

Repechage round 1
Park Su-hyeon (KOR)	0
Orozobek Toktomambetov (KGZ)	11
Mulayam Yadav (IND)	4
Yoshinosuke Aoyagi (JPN)	14

Bronze medals
Orozobek Toktomambetov (KGZ)	2
Morteza Ghiasi (IRI)	1
Yoshinosuke Aoyagi (JPN)	12
Orts Isakov (JOR)	2

=== 74 kg ===
14 April

Round of 16
Olonbayaryn Süldkhüü (MGL)	11
Abdulrahman Ibrahim (QAT)	0
Magomet Evloev (TJK)	9^{F}
Jumadurdy Mamyşow (TKM)	0
Gong Byung-min (KOR)	11
Panadurage Fernando (SRI)	0
Yash Tushir (IND)	2
Kirin Kinoshita (JPN)	8
Xia Shengsong (CHN)	0
Magomedrasul Asluev (BRN)	7
Hossein Abouzari (IRI)	9
Erzo Isakov (JOR)	0
Jafar Chuliboyev (UZB)	1
Adilet Zhaparkulov (KGZ)	9
Lou Hong Yeow (SGP)	0
Darkhan Yessengali (KAZ)	10

Quarterfinals
Olonbayaryn Süldkhüü (MGL)	8
Magomet Evloev (TJK)	3
Gong Byung-min (KOR)	3
Kirin Kinoshita (JPN)	6
Magomedrasul Asluev (BRN)	5
Hossein Abouzari (IRI)	3
Adilet Zhaparkulov (KGZ)	0
Darkhan Yessengali (KAZ)	4

Semifinals
Olonbayaryn Süldkhüü (MGL)	2
Kirin Kinoshita (JPN)	12
Magomedrasul Asluev (BRN)	1
Darkhan Yessengali (KAZ)	2

Final
Kirin Kinoshita (JPN)	2
Darkhan Yessengali (KAZ)	7

Repechage round 1
Yash Tushir (IND)	1
Gong Byung-min (KOR)	11
Lou Hong Yeow (SGP)	0
Adilet Zhaparkulov (KGZ)	10

Bronze medals
Gong Byung-min (KOR)	0
Olonbayaryn Süldkhüü (MGL)	6
Adilet Zhaparkulov (KGZ)	2
Magomedrasul Asluev (BRN)	3

=== 79 kg ===
13 April

Round of 16
Lee Gun-woo (KOR)	0
Shuhrat Bozorov (TJK)	6
Li Peilong (CHN)	1
Bat-Erdeniin Byambadorj (MGL)	6^{F}
Wepa Hemenekow (TKM)	0
Yajuro Yamasaki (JPN)	10
Adilet Maratbaev (KGZ)	4
Khidir Saipudinov (BRN)	13

Quarterfinals
Bekzod Abdurakhmonov (UZB)	11
Shuhrat Bozorov (TJK)	0
Bat-Erdeniin Byambadorj (MGL)	1
Deepak Mirka (IND)	4
Bolat Sakayev (KAZ)	8
Yajuro Yamasaki (JPN)	1
Khidir Saipudinov (BRN)	2
Amir Hossein Kavousi (IRI)	12

Semifinals
Bekzod Abdurakhmonov (UZB)	10
Deepak Mirka (IND)	0
Bolat Sakayev (KAZ)	8^{F}
Amir Hossein Kavousi (IRI)	5

Final
Bekzod Abdurakhmonov (UZB)	4
Bolat Sakayev (KAZ)	7

Bronze medals
Shuhrat Bozorov (TJK)	1
Deepak Mirka (IND)	12
Yajuro Yamasaki (JPN)	0
Amir Hossein Kavousi (IRI)	6

=== 86 kg ===
14 April

Round of 16
~~Nouman Zaka (PAK)~~
Gary Chow (SGP)	WO
Jonty Bhati (IND)	5
Nurtilek Karypbaev (KGZ)	2
Döwletmyrat Orazgylyjow (TKM)	8
Bobur Islomov (UZB)	10
Mustafa Abdul-Basit (IRQ)	4
Byambasürengiin Bat-Erdene (MGL)	14
Kim Gwan-uk (KOR)	2
Alireza Karimi (IRI)	5

Quarterfinals
Azamat Dauletbekov (KAZ)	10
Gary Chow (SGP)	0
Jonty Bhati (IND)	0
Bobur Islomov (UZB)	10
Hayato Ishiguro (JPN)	12
Byambasürengiin Bat-Erdene (MGL)	2
Alireza Karimi (IRI)	10
Lin Zushen (CHN)	0

Semifinals
Azamat Dauletbekov (KAZ)	10
Bobur Islomov (UZB)	0
Hayato Ishiguro (JPN)	2
Alireza Karimi (IRI)	9

Final
Azamat Dauletbekov (KAZ)	4
Alireza Karimi (IRI)	1

Repechage round 1
Kim Gwan-uk (KOR)	3
Lin Zushen (CHN)	7

Bronze medals
Gary Chow (SGP)	0
Bobur Islomov (UZB)	10
Lin Zushen (CHN)	0
Hayato Ishiguro (JPN)	11

=== 92 kg ===
14 April

Round of 16
Arashk Mohebbi (IRI)	0
Arash Yoshida (JPN)	10
Ajiniyaz Saparniyazov (UZB)	6^{F}
Jang Woo-min (KOR)	0
Sun Xiao (CHN)	1
Deepak Punia (IND)	8
Mirlan Chynybekov (KGZ)	5
Issa Abdul-Salam (IRQ)	0

Quarterfinals
Ganbaataryn Gankhuyag (MGL)	7
Arash Yoshida (JPN)	9
Ajiniyaz Saparniyazov (UZB)	13
Abdulkareem Abuidaij (JOR)	0
Magomed Sharipov (BRN)	5
Deepak Punia (IND)	0
Mirlan Chynybekov (KGZ)	3
Rizabek Aitmukhan (KAZ)	14

Semifinals
Arash Yoshida (JPN)	13
Ajiniyaz Saparniyazov (UZB)	2
Magomed Sharipov (BRN)	1
Rizabek Aitmukhan (KAZ)	6

Final
Arash Yoshida (JPN)	11
Rizabek Aitmukhan (KAZ)	4

Repechage round 1
Arashk Mohebbi (IRI)	4
Ganbaataryn Gankhuyag (MGL)	6

Bronze medals
Ganbaataryn Gankhuyag (MGL)	10
Ajiniyaz Saparniyazov (UZB)	0
Mirlan Chynybekov (KGZ)	0
Magomed Sharipov (BRN)	10

=== 97 kg ===
13 April

Round of 16
Arslanbek Turdubekov (KGZ)	2
Deepak Nehra (IND)	8^{F}
Şatlyk Hemelýäýew (TKM)	1
Bekzat Urkimbay (KAZ)	2
Baasantsogtyn Ölziisaikhan (MGL)	0
Mojtaba Goleij (IRI)	12

Quarterfinals
Habila Awusayiman (CHN)	5
Deepak Nehra (IND)	2
Seo Ju-hwan (KOR)	3
Makhsud Veysalov (UZB)	6
Akhmed Tazhudinov (BRN)	7^{F}
Bekzat Urkimbay (KAZ)	0
Mojtaba Goleij (IRI)	11
Takashi Ishiguro (JPN)	0

Semifinals
Habila Awusayiman (CHN)	10
Makhsud Veysalov (UZB)	0
Akhmed Tazhudinov (BRN)	13
Mojtaba Goleij (IRI)	8

Final
Habila Awusayiman (CHN)	0
Akhmed Tazhudinov (BRN)	11

Bronze medals
Deepak Nehra (IND)	9
Makhsud Veysalov (UZB)	12
Bekzat Urkimbay (KAZ)	0
Mojtaba Goleij (IRI)	11

=== 125 kg ===
14 April

Round of 16
Buheeerdun (CHN)	6
Ahmed Salah (IRQ)	3
Jung Yei-hyun (KOR)	6
Muzafar Zhappuev (KGZ)	4
Taiki Yamamoto (JPN)	2
Anirudh Gulia (IND)	8

Quarterfinals
Mönkhtöriin Lkhagvagerel (MGL)	10
Buheeerdun (CHN)	0
Amir Reza Masoumi (IRI)	10
Zyýamuhammet Saparow (TKM)	0
Sardorbek Kholmatov (UZB)	10
Jung Yei-hyun (KOR)	0
Anirudh Gulia (IND)	0
Yusup Batirmurzaev (KAZ)	2^{F}

Semifinals
Mönkhtöriin Lkhagvagerel (MGL)	8
Amir Reza Masoumi (IRI)	6
Sardorbek Kholmatov (UZB)	0
Yusup Batirmurzaev (KAZ)	7^{F}

Final
Mönkhtöriin Lkhagvagerel (MGL)	1
Yusup Batirmurzaev (KAZ)	1

Bronze medals
Buheeerdun (CHN)	4^{F}
Amir Reza Masoumi (IRI)	2
Anirudh Gulia (IND)	12
Sardorbek Kholmatov (UZB)	2

== Men's Greco-Roman ==
=== 55 kg ===
9 April

Round of 16
Sardarbek Konushbaev (KGZ)	7
Rupin Gahlawat (IND)	16
Taiga Onishi (JPN)	5
Mostafa Al-Qade (JOR)	0

Quarterfinals
Amangali Bekbolatov (KAZ)	4
Rupin Gahlawat (IND)	6
Zhang Haifeng (CHN)	8
Jeon Hyeok-jin (KOR)	3
Ikhtiyor Botirov (UZB)	9
Abduwali Rahimbaýew (TKM)	4
Taiga Onishi (JPN)	0
Pouya Dadmarz (IRI)	8

Semifinals
Rupin Gahlawat (IND)	3
Zhang Haifeng (CHN)	1
Ikhtiyor Botirov (UZB)	1
Pouya Dadmarz (IRI)	8

Final
Rupin Gahlawat (IND)	1
Pouya Dadmarz (IRI)	3

Repechage round 1
Sardarbek Konushbaev (KGZ)	0
Amangali Bekbolatov (KAZ)	9

Bronze medals
Amangali Bekbolatov (KAZ)	9
Zhang Haifeng (CHN)	0
Taiga Onishi (JPN)	0
Ikhtiyor Botirov (UZB)	9

- Sardarbek Konushbaev of Kyrgyzstan originally finished seventh, but was disqualified after he tested positive for Methasterone.

=== 60 kg ===
10 April

Round of 16
Umit Durdyýew (TKM)	0
Sumit Dalal (IND)	9
Yernur Fidakhmetov (KAZ)	8
Huang Jui-chi (TPE)	1
Chung Han-jae (KOR)	10
Aslamjon Azizov (TJK)	0

Quarterfinals
Zholaman Sharshenbekov (KGZ)	10
Sumit Dalal (IND)	0
Akmal Khamroev (UZB)	10
Maito Kawana (JPN)	17
Mehdi Mohsennejad (IRI)	3
Yernur Fidakhmetov (KAZ)	4
Chung Han-jae (KOR)	3
Cao Liguo (CHN)	1

Semifinals
Zholaman Sharshenbekov (KGZ)	4
Maito Kawana (JPN)	0
Yernur Fidakhmetov (KAZ)	5
Chung Han-jae (KOR)	7

Final
Zholaman Sharshenbekov (KGZ)	10
Chung Han-jae (KOR)	0

Repechage round 1
Aslamjon Azizov (TJK)	1
Cao Liguo (CHN)	3

Bronze medals
Sumit Dalal (IND)	6
Maito Kawana (JPN)	14^{C}
Cao Liguo (CHN)	4
Yernur Fidakhmetov (KAZ)	2

=== 63 kg ===
9 April

Round of 16
Neeraj Chhikara (IND)	7
Dastan Kadyrov (KGZ)	6

Quarterfinals
Iman Mohammadi (IRI)	9
Neeraj Chhikara (IND)	0
Siyovush Achilov (TJK)	1
Song Jin-seub (KOR)	9
Shermukhammad Sharibjanov (UZB)	9
Chiezo Maruyama (JPN)	3
Tan Haodong (CHN)	0
Mukhamedali Mamurbek (KAZ)	9

Semifinals
Iman Mohammadi (IRI)	9
Song Jin-seub (KOR)	0
Shermukhammad Sharibjanov (UZB)	6^{F}
Mukhamedali Mamurbek (KAZ)	5

Final
Iman Mohammadi (IRI)	9
Shermukhammad Sharibjanov (UZB)	0

Bronze medals
Neeraj Chhikara (IND)	5
Song Jin-seub (KOR)	2
Chiezo Maruyama (JPN)	0
Mukhamedali Mamurbek (KAZ)	9

=== 67 kg ===
10 April

Round of 16
Kyotaro Sogabe (JPN)	8^{F}
Razzak Beishekeev (KGZ)	0
Abror Atabaev (UZB)	10
Firuz Mirzoradzhabov (TJK)	1
Chen Hong-yu (TPE)	5
Almat Kebispayev (KAZ)	7

Quarterfinals
Husiyuetu (CHN)	0
Kyotaro Sogabe (JPN)	5
Begmyrat Nobatow (TKM)	0
Reza Abbasi (IRI)	8
Ryu Han-su (KOR)
Abror Atabaev (UZB)	WO
Almat Kebispayev (KAZ)	9
Ashu Bazard (IND)	1

Semifinals
Kyotaro Sogabe (JPN)	5
Reza Abbasi (IRI)	1
Abror Atabaev (UZB)	10
Almat Kebispayev (KAZ)	2

Final
Kyotaro Sogabe (JPN)	0
Abror Atabaev (UZB)	10

Repechage round 1
Razzak Beishekeev (KGZ)	5
Husiyuetu (CHN)	1
Firuz Mirzoradzhabov (TJK)	WO
Ryu Han-su (KOR)

Bronze medals
Razzak Beishekeev (KGZ)	9
Reza Abbasi (IRI)	0
Firuz Mirzoradzhabov (TJK)	3
Almat Kebispayev (KAZ)	7

=== 72 kg ===
10 April

Round of 16
Adilkhan Nurlanbekov (KGZ)	9
Loiqi Amirkhonzoda (TJK)	0
Lim Zi Xyan (SGP)	0
Ali Mohammed (IRQ)	14
Taishi Horie (JPN)	3
Jamol Jumabaev (UZB)	8
Lee Ji-yeon (KOR)	0
Vikas Dalal (IND)	11
Hekim Gurbanmyradow (TKM)	7^{F}
Jason Baucas (PHI)	0

Quarterfinals
Ibragim Magomadov (KAZ)	5
Adilkhan Nurlanbekov (KGZ)	1
Ali Mohammed (IRQ)	5
Jamol Jumabaev (UZB)	3
Sajjad Imentalab (IRI)	6
Vikas Dalal (IND)	1
Hekim Gurbanmyradow (TKM)	0
Tan Jian (CHN)	8

Semifinals
Ibragim Magomadov (KAZ)	6
Ali Mohammed (IRQ)	0
Sajjad Imentalab (IRI)	9
Tan Jian (CHN)	0

Final
Ibragim Magomadov (KAZ)	5
Sajjad Imentalab (IRI)	2

Bronze medals
Adilkhan Nurlanbekov (KGZ)	2
Ali Mohammed (IRQ)	1
Vikas Dalal (IND)	8
Tan Jian (CHN)	0

=== 77 kg ===
9 April

Round of 16
Gadiel Raid (SGP)	1
Jeýhun Owezdurdyýew (TKM)	10
Kodai Sakuraba (JPN)	10
Yao Lai-hsing (TPE)	1
Amro Sadeh (JOR)	0
Demeu Zhadrayev (KAZ)	9
Sajan Bhanwal (IND)	1
Amin Kavianinejad (IRI)	3

Quarterfinals
Akzhol Makhmudov (KGZ)	9
Jeýhun Owezdurdyýew (TKM)	0
Kodai Sakuraba (JPN)	7
Kim Hyeon-woo (KOR)	5
Aram Vardanyan (UZB)	2
Demeu Zhadrayev (KAZ)	7
Amin Kavianinejad (IRI)	1
Liu Rui (CHN)	1

Semifinals
Akzhol Makhmudov (KGZ)	9
Kodai Sakuraba (JPN)	1
Demeu Zhadrayev (KAZ)	1
Amin Kavianinejad (IRI)	3

Final
Akzhol Makhmudov (KGZ)	WO
Amin Kavianinejad (IRI)

Repechage round 1
Sajan Bhanwal (IND)	1
Liu Rui (CHN)	4

Bronze medals
Jeýhun Owezdurdyýew (TKM)	0
Kodai Sakuraba (JPN)	9
Liu Rui (CHN)	5
Demeu Zhadrayev (KAZ)	2

=== 82 kg ===
10 April

Round of 16
Mukhammadkodir Rasulov (UZB)	9
Sukhrob Abdulkhaev (TJK)	0
Rohit Dahiya (IND)	12
Aryan Azman (SGP)	4
Bahejiang Halishan (CHN)	9
Yang Se-jin (KOR)	0

Quarterfinals
Dias Kalen (KAZ)	3
Mukhammadkodir Rasulov (UZB)	1
Yuya Maeta (JPN)	3
Sultan Ali Eid (JOR)	1
Akylbek Talantbekov (KGZ)	7
Rohit Dahiya (IND)	1
Bahejiang Halishan (CHN)	0
Alireza Mohmadi (IRI)	7

Semifinals
Dias Kalen (KAZ)	7
Yuya Maeta (JPN)	1
Akylbek Talantbekov (KGZ)	8
Alireza Mohmadi (IRI)	0

Final
Dias Kalen (KAZ)	2
Akylbek Talantbekov (KGZ)	3

Bronze medals
Mukhammadkodir Rasulov (UZB)	1
Yuya Maeta (JPN)	3
Rohit Dahiya (IND)	1
Alireza Mohmadi (IRI)	5

- Akylbek Talantbekov of Kyrgyzstan originally won the gold medal, but was disqualified after he tested positive for Methasterone. Dias Kalen was upgraded to the gold medal, Alireza Mohmadi to the silver medal and Rohit Dahiya was raised to third and took the bronze medal.

=== 87 kg ===
9 April

Round of 16
Masato Sumi (JPN)	11
Şyhazberdi Öwelekow (TKM)	0
Wang Chengwu (CHN)	0
Jalgasbay Berdimuratov (UZB)	8

Quarterfinals
Nasser Alizadeh (IRI)	1
Masato Sumi (JPN)	1
Saidislomiddin Aslamov (TJK)	1
Sunil Kumar (IND)	9
Atabek Azisbekov (KGZ)	7
Shin Byeong-cheol (KOR)	7
Jalgasbay Berdimuratov (UZB)	5
Nursultan Tursynov (KAZ)	11

Semifinals
Nasser Alizadeh (IRI)	7
Sunil Kumar (IND)	2
Atabek Azisbekov (KGZ)	0
Nursultan Tursynov (KAZ)	12

Final
Nasser Alizadeh (IRI)	8
Nursultan Tursynov (KAZ)	0

Bronze medals
Masato Sumi (JPN)	1
Sunil Kumar (IND)	4
Jalgasbay Berdimuratov (UZB)	2
Atabek Azisbekov (KGZ)	2

=== 97 kg ===
10 April

Round of 16
Lee Se-yeol (KOR)	1
Uzur Dzhuzupbekov (KGZ)	10
Amanberdi Agamämmedow (TKM)	0
Abrorbek Nurmukhammedov (UZB)	8

Quarterfinals
Olzhas Syrlybay (KAZ)	1
Uzur Dzhuzupbekov (KGZ)	3
Azizdzhon Zaripov (TJK)	0
Narinder Cheema (IND)	11
Yuta Nara (JPN)	5
Mehdi Bali (IRI)	7
Abrorbek Nurmukhammedov (UZB)	2
Li Yiming (CHN)	4

Semifinals
Uzur Dzhuzupbekov (KGZ)	9
Narinder Cheema (IND)	0
Mehdi Bali (IRI)	7
Li Yiming (CHN)	1

Final
Uzur Dzhuzupbekov (KGZ)	4
Mehdi Bali (IRI)	7

Repechage round 1
Lee Se-yeol (KOR)	1
Olzhas Syrlybay (KAZ)	4^{F}

Bronze medals
Olzhas Syrlybay (KAZ)	4
Narinder Cheema (IND)	1
Yuta Nara (JPN)	5
Li Yiming (CHN)	2

=== 130 kg ===
9 April

Round of 16
Sota Okumura (JPN)	0
Roman Kim (KGZ)	8
Ali Yaseen (IRQ)	3
Aýbegşazada Kürräýew (TKM)	5^{F}
Kim Min-seok (KOR)	8
Timothy Loh (SGP)	0

Quarterfinals
Amin Mirzazadeh (IRI)	9
Roman Kim (KGZ)	0
Naveen Sevlia (IND)	3
Temurbek Nasimov (UZB)	5
Alimkhan Syzdykov (KAZ)	9
Aýbegşazada Kürräýew (TKM)	0
Kim Min-seok (KOR)	1
Meng Lingzhe (CHN)	1

Semifinals
Amin Mirzazadeh (IRI)	9
Temurbek Nasimov (UZB)	0
Alimkhan Syzdykov (KAZ)	3
Meng Lingzhe (CHN)	11^{C}

Final
Amin Mirzazadeh (IRI)	2
Meng Lingzhe (CHN)	0

Bronze medals
Roman Kim (KGZ)	10
Temurbek Nasimov (UZB)	1
Kim Min-seok (KOR)	3
Alimkhan Syzdykov (KAZ)	5

== Women's freestyle ==
=== 50 kg ===
11 April

Round of 16
~~Nguyễn Thị Xuân (VIE)~~
Chen Yi-jing (TPE)	WO
Jiah Pingot (PHI)	0
Ellada Makhyaddinova (KAZ)	10
Remina Yoshimoto (JPN)	10
Tsogt-Ochiryn Namuuntsetseg (MGL)	0

Quarterfinals
Jasmina Immaeva (UZB)	10
Chen Yi-jing (TPE)	0
Laçyn Annamyradowa (TKM)	0
Cheon Mi-ran (KOR)	12
Neelam Sirohi (IND)	10^{F}
Ellada Makhyaddinova (KAZ)	1
Remina Yoshimoto (JPN)	10
Feng Ziqi (CHN)	2

Semifinals
Jasmina Immaeva (UZB)	8
Cheon Mi-ran (KOR)	1
Neelam Sirohi (IND)	0
Remina Yoshimoto (JPN)	8^{F}

Final
Jasmina Immaeva (UZB)	0
Remina Yoshimoto (JPN)	7^{F}

Repechage round 1
Tsogt-Ochiryn Namuuntsetseg (MGL)	0
Feng Ziqi (CHN)	8^{F}

Bronze medals
Chen Yi-jing (TPE)	2
Cheon Mi-ran (KOR)	4
Feng Ziqi (CHN)	10
Neelam Sirohi (IND)	0

=== 53 kg ===
12 April

Round of 16
Alvina Lim (SGP)	0
Antim Panghal (IND)	10^{F}
Oh Hyun-young (KOR)	7^{F}
Bùi Thị Đào (VIE)	1
Altyn Shagayeva (KAZ)	3
Hsieh Meng-hsuan (TPE)	4

Quarterfinals
Deng Li (CHN)	0
Antim Panghal (IND)	6
Nethmi Ahinsa (SRI)	2
Aktenge Keunimjaeva (UZB)	9^{F}
Bat-Ochiryn Bolortuyaa (MGL)	10
Oh Hyun-young (KOR)	0
Hsieh Meng-hsuan (TPE)	0
Akari Fujinami (JPN)	11

Semifinals
Antim Panghal (IND)	8^{F}
Aktenge Keunimjaeva (UZB)	1
Bat-Ochiryn Bolortuyaa (MGL)	0
Akari Fujinami (JPN)	10

Final
Antim Panghal (IND)	0
Akari Fujinami (JPN)	10

Repechage round 1
Alvina Lim (SGP)	0
Deng Li (CHN)	4^{F}

Bronze medals
Deng Li (CHN)	6
Aktenge Keunimjaeva (UZB)	9
Hsieh Meng-hsuan (TPE)	0
Bat-Ochiryn Bolortuyaa (MGL)	11

=== 55 kg ===
11 April

Quarterfinals		Semifinals		Final
Marina Sedneva (KAZ)	4^{F}
Sito (IND)	0	Marina Sedneva (KAZ)	0
Chinboldyn Otgontuyaa (MGL)	WO	Chinboldyn Otgontuyaa (MGL)	10
Nguyễn Thị Mỹ Trang (VIE)				Chinboldyn Otgontuyaa (MGL)	2
Aruuke Kadyrbek Kyzy (KGZ)	0			Pang Qianyu (CHN)	6
Rino Kataoka (JPN)	11	Rino Kataoka (JPN)	1
Pang Qianyu (CHN)	11	Pang Qianyu (CHN)	6
Shokhida Akhmedova (UZB)	0

Bronze medals
Nguyễn Thị Mỹ Trang (VIE)	6
Marina Sedneva (KAZ)	9^{F}
Shokhida Akhmedova (UZB)	4
Rino Kataoka (JPN)	10

=== 57 kg ===
12 April

Round of 16
Cheng Yu-han (TPE)	5
Nilufar Raimova (KAZ)	6
Bat-Erdeniin Erdenesuvd (MGL)	10^{F}
Trần Thị Ánh (VIE)	1
Danielle Lim (SGP)	0
Anshu Malik (IND)	11

Quarterfinals
Laylokhon Sobirova (UZB)	4^{F}
Nilufar Raimova (KAZ)	0
Bermet Nuridin Kyzy (KGZ)	7^{F}
Kwon Young-jin (KOR)	0
Sae Nanjo (JPN)	10
Bat-Erdeniin Erdenesuvd (MGL)	0
Anshu Malik (IND)	5
Zhang Qi (CHN)	4

Semifinals
Laylokhon Sobirova (UZB)	11
Bermet Nuridin Kyzy (KGZ)	0
Sae Nanjo (JPN)	5
Anshu Malik (IND)	1

Final
Laylokhon Sobirova (UZB)	4
Sae Nanjo (JPN)	11^{F}

Bronze medals
Nilufar Raimova (KAZ)	7
Bermet Nuridin Kyzy (KGZ)	0
Bat-Erdeniin Erdenesuvd (MGL)	0
Anshu Malik (IND)	10

=== 59 kg ===
11 April

Pos	Athlete	Pld	W	L	CP	TP	KGZ	KAZ	UZB
1	Kalmira Bilimbek Kyzy (KGZ)	2	2	0	7	13	—	2–1	11–0
2	Diana Kayumova (KAZ)	2	1	1	5	13	1–3 PO1	—	12–1
3	Sarbinaz Jienbaeva (UZB)	2	0	2	1	1	0–4 SU	1–4 SU1	—

Source: UWW

Pos	Athlete	Pld	W	L	CP	TP	JPN	CHN	IND	MGL
1	Yui Sakano (JPN)	3	3	0	12	26	—	13–2	6–1	7–2 Fall
2	Zhuomalaga (CHN)	3	2	1	9	16	1–4 SU1	—	8–0 Fall	6–4
3	Sarita Mor (IND)	3	1	2	4	5	1–3 PO1	0–5 FA	—	4–1
4	Khürelkhüügiin Bolortuyaa (MGL)	3	0	3	2	7	0–5 FA	1–3 PO1	1–3 PO1	—

Source: UWW

Semifinals
Kalmira Bilimbek Kyzy (KGZ)	2
Zhuomalaga (CHN)	6
Yui Sakano (JPN)	10
Diana Kayumova (KAZ)	0

Final
Zhuomalaga (CHN)	1
Yui Sakano (JPN)	5
Bronze medal
Kalmira Bilimbek Kyzy (KGZ)	11
Diana Kayumova (KAZ)	6

=== 62 kg ===
12 April

Round of 16
Jo Su-been (KOR)	4
Irina Kuznetsova (KAZ)	5
Trần Ánh Tuyết (VIE)	1
Pai Hsin-ping (TPE)	2

Quarterfinals
Luo Xiaojuan (CHN)	6
Irina Kuznetsova (KAZ)	4
Pürevdorjiin Orkhon (MGL)	7^{F}
Sonam Malik (IND)	1
Aisuluu Tynybekova (KGZ)	4^{F}
Dilfuza Aimbetova (UZB)	0
Pai Hsin-ping (TPE)	0
Nonoka Ozaki (JPN)	10

Semifinals
Luo Xiaojuan (CHN)	3
Pürevdorjiin Orkhon (MGL)	7
Aisuluu Tynybekova (KGZ)	2
Nonoka Ozaki (JPN)	2

Final
Pürevdorjiin Orkhon (MGL)	5
Aisuluu Tynybekova (KGZ)	9

Bronze medals
Sonam Malik (IND)	5
Luo Xiaojuan (CHN)	1
Dilfuza Aimbetova (UZB)	0
Nonoka Ozaki (JPN)	2^{F}

=== 65 kg ===
12 April

Pos	Athlete	Pld	W	L	CP	TP	CHN	IND	MGL	UZB
1	Long Jia (CHN)	3	3	0	12	31	—	11–0	10–0	10–0
2	Manisha Bhanwala (IND)	3	2	1	8	8	0–4 SU	—	2–1	6–0 Fall
3	Baatarjavyn Shoovdor (MGL)	3	1	2	5	14	0–4 SU	1–3 PO1	—	13–0
4	Ariukhan Jumabaeva (UZB)	3	0	3	0	0	0–4 SU	0–5 FA	0–4 SU	—

Source: UWW

Pos	Athlete	Pld	W	L	CP	TP	JPN	KAZ	KGZ
1	Mahiro Yoshitake (JPN)	2	2	0	9	13	—	3–2 Fall	10–0
2	Albina Kairgeldinova (KAZ)	2	1	1	3	9	0–5 FA	—	7–7
3	Dilnaz Sazanova (KGZ)	2	0	2	1	7	0–4 SU	1–3 PO1	—

Source: UWW

Semifinals
Long Jia (CHN)	10
Albina Kairgeldinova (KAZ)	0
Mahiro Yoshitake (JPN)	2^{F}
Manisha Bhanwala (IND)	1

Final
Long Jia (CHN)	5
Mahiro Yoshitake (JPN)	3
Bronze medal
Albina Kairgeldinova (KAZ)	0
Manisha Bhanwala (IND)	8^{F}

=== 68 kg ===
11 April

Round of 16
Yelena Shalygina (KAZ)	10
Oguljan Egemberdiýewa (TKM)	0
Firuza Esenbaeva (UZB)	WO
~~Lại Diệu Thương (VIE)~~

Quarterfinals
Ami Ishii (JPN)	10
Yelena Shalygina (KAZ)	0
Ha Min-ji (KOR)	0
Meerim Zhumanazarova (KGZ)	10
Enkhsaikhany Delgermaa (MGL)	10
Nisha Dahiya (IND)	10
Firuza Esenbaeva (UZB)	2
Zhou Feng (CHN)	8

Semifinals
Ami Ishii (JPN)	6
Meerim Zhumanazarova (KGZ)	2
Nisha Dahiya (IND)	7
Zhou Feng (CHN)	6

Final
Ami Ishii (JPN)	10^{F}
Nisha Dahiya (IND)	0

Bronze medals
Yelena Shalygina (KAZ)	0
Meerim Zhumanazarova (KGZ)	0^{R}
Enkhsaikhany Delgermaa (MGL)	2
Zhou Feng (CHN)	9

=== 72 kg ===
12 April

Quarterfinals		Semifinals		Final
Zhamila Bakbergenova (KAZ)	10
Hung Ping-tsen (TPE)	0	Zhamila Bakbergenova (KAZ)	11
Jiang Qian (CHN)	6	Enkh-Amaryn Davaanasan (MGL)	1
Enkh-Amaryn Davaanasan (MGL)	9			Zhamila Bakbergenova (KAZ)	5
Reetika Hooda (IND)	6			Sumire Niikura (JPN)	1
Nurzat Nurtaeva (KGZ)	3	Reetika Hooda (IND)	4
Sumire Niikura (JPN)	11	Sumire Niikura (JPN)	5
Svetlana Oknazarova (UZB)	1

Bronze medals
Hung Ping-tsen (TPE)	0
Enkh-Amaryn Davaanasan (MGL)	11
Svetlana Oknazarova (UZB)	1
Reetika Hooda (IND)	5

=== 76 kg ===
11 April

Round of 16
~~Đặng Thị Linh (VIE)~~
Jeong Seo-yeon (KOR)	WO
Chang Hui-tsz (TPE)	1
Priya Malik (IND)	2

Quarterfinals
Wang Juan (CHN)	7
Jeong Seo-yeon (KOR)	0
Ozoda Zaripboeva (UZB)	1
Elmira Syzdykova (KAZ)	11
Ganbatyn Ariunjargal (MGL)	3
Mizuki Nagashima (JPN)	4
Priya Malik (IND)	0
Aiperi Medet Kyzy (KGZ)	4^{F}

Semifinals
Wang Juan (CHN)	4
Elmira Syzdykova (KAZ)	6
Mizuki Nagashima (JPN)	2
Aiperi Medet Kyzy (KGZ)	3

Final
Elmira Syzdykova (KAZ)	5^{F}
Aiperi Medet Kyzy (KGZ)	0

Repechage round 1
Ozoda Zaripboeva (UZB)	0
Wang Juan (CHN)	10
Priya Malik (IND)	2
Mizuki Nagashima (JPN)	1
