= 2023 World Wrestling Championships – Men's freestyle 97 kg =

Wrestling competitions

Men's freestyle 97 kg at the 2023 World Championships
- Venue: Štark Arena
- Dates: 18–19 September 2023
- Competitors: 35 from 32 nations

Medalists
gold medal	Akhmed Tazhudinov	Bahrain
silver medal	Magomedkhan Magomedov	Azerbaijan
bronze medal	Kyle Snyder	United States
bronze medal	Givi Matcharashvili	Georgia

The men's freestyle 97 kilograms is a competition featured at the 2023 World Wrestling Championships, and was held in Belgrade, Serbia on 18 and 19 September 2023.

This freestyle wrestling competition consists of a single-elimination tournament, with a repechage used to determine the winner of two bronze medals. The two finalists face off for gold and silver medals. Each wrestler who loses to one of the two finalists moves into the repechage, culminating in a pair of bronze medal matches featuring the semifinal losers each facing the remaining repechage opponent from their half of the bracket.

== Results ==
Legend

- F — Won by fall
- R — Retired
- WO — Won by walkover

=== Finals ===
Semifinals		Final
Akhmed Tazhudinov (BRN)	9
Abdulrashid Sadulaev (AIN)	2^{R}	Akhmed Tazhudinov (BRN)	8^{F}
Givi Matcharashvili (GEO)	1	Magomedkhan Magomedov (AZE)	1
Magomedkhan Magomedov (AZE)	6

=== Top half ===
==== Section 1 ====
Round of 64
Şatlyk Hemelýäýew (TKM)	8
Carlos Angulo (COL)	4^{F}

Round of 32
Kyle Snyder (USA)	11
Nishan Randhawa (CAN)	0
Radu Lefter (MDA)	7
Baltmönkhiin Badamdorj (MGL)	4
Carlos Angulo (COL)	2
Maxwell Lacey (CRC)	11^{F}
Magomed Ibragimov (UZB)	0
Akhmed Tazhudinov (BRN)	10

Round of 16
Kyle Snyder (USA)	12
Radu Lefter (MDA)	1
Maxwell Lacey (CRC)	0
Akhmed Tazhudinov (BRN)	10

Quarterfinals
Kyle Snyder (USA)	0
Akhmed Tazhudinov (BRN)	11

==== Section 2 ====
Round of 64

Round of 32
Ben Honis (ITA)	2
Mojtaba Goleij (IRI)	8
Murazi Mchedlidze (UKR)	3
Takashi Ishiguro (JPN)	6
Abdulrashid Sadulaev (AIN)	7
Steyn de Lange (RSA)	0
Lukas Krasauskas (LTU)	0
Vladislav Baitsaev (HUN)	10

Round of 16
Mojtaba Goleij (IRI)	11
Takashi Ishiguro (JPN)	1
Abdulrashid Sadulaev (AIN)	4
Vladislav Baitsaev (HUN)	2

Quarterfinals
Mojtaba Goleij (IRI)	4
Abdulrashid Sadulaev (AIN)	4^{F}

=== Bottom half ===
==== Section 3 ====
Round of 64
Sergey Sargsyan (ARM)	8
Samuel Scherrer (SUI)	6

Round of 32
Givi Matcharashvili (GEO)	5
Magomedgaji Nurov (MKD)	4
Akhmed Bataev (BUL)	5
Mostafa El-Ders (EGY)	0
Sergey Sargsyan (ARM)	4
Sahil Ahlawat (UWW)	5
Alisher Yergali (KAZ)	2
Habila Awusayiman (CHN)	1

Round of 16
Givi Matcharashvili (GEO)	7
Akhmed Bataev (BUL)	5
Sahil Ahlawat (UWW)	1
Alisher Yergali (KAZ)	11

Quarterfinals
Givi Matcharashvili (GEO)	2
Alisher Yergali (KAZ)	0

==== Section 4 ====
Round of 64
Zbigniew Baranowski (POL)	5
Aliaksandr Hushtyn (AIN)	2

Round of 32
Erik Thiele (GER)	11
Thomas Barns (AUS)	0
Kim Jae-gang (KOR)	0
Zbigniew Baranowski (POL)	7
İbrahim Çiftçi (TUR)	10
Utah Mann (TGA)	0
Strahinja Despić (SRB)	0
Magomedkhan Magomedov (AZE)	7

Round of 16
Erik Thiele (GER)	6
Zbigniew Baranowski (POL)	1
İbrahim Çiftçi (TUR)	0
Magomedkhan Magomedov (AZE)	4

Quarterfinals
Erik Thiele (GER)	5
Magomedkhan Magomedov (AZE)	5^{F}

=== Repechage ===
Repechage round 2
Magomed Ibragimov (UZB)	10
Maxwell Lacey (CRC)	0
Strahinja Despić (SRB)	0
İbrahim Çiftçi (TUR)	10

Repechage round 3
Magomed Ibragimov (UZB)	6
Kyle Snyder (USA)	10
İbrahim Çiftçi (TUR)	3
Erik Thiele (GER)	1

Bronze medals
Kyle Snyder (USA)	WO
Abdulrashid Sadulaev (AIN)
İbrahim Çiftçi (TUR)	2
Givi Matcharashvili (GEO)	6

Olympic wrestle-off
Abdulrashid Sadulaev (AIN)
İbrahim Çiftçi (TUR)	WO

== Final standing ==
Rank	Athlete
1st place, gold medalist(s)	Akhmed Tazhudinov (BRN)
2nd place, silver medalist(s)	Magomedkhan Magomedov (AZE)
3rd place, bronze medalist(s)	Kyle Snyder (USA)
3rd place, bronze medalist(s)	Givi Matcharashvili (GEO)
5	İbrahim Çiftçi (TUR)
5	Abdulrashid Sadulaev (AIN)
7	Erik Thiele (GER)
8	Mojtaba Goleij (IRI)
9	Alisher Yergali (KAZ)
10	Zbigniew Baranowski (POL)
11	Maxwell Lacey (CRC)
12	Carlos Angulo (COL)
13	Magomed Ibragimov (UZB)
14	Vladislav Baitsaev (HUN)
15	Sergey Sargsyan (ARM)
16	Akhmed Bataev (BUL)
17	Radu Lefter (MDA)
18	Takashi Ishiguro (JPN)
19	Sahil Ahlawat (UWW)
20	Samuel Scherrer (SUI)
21	Magomedgaji Nurov (MKD)
22	Baltmönkhiin Badamdorj (MGL)
23	Murazi Mchedlidze (UKR)
24	Aliaksandr Hushtyn (AIN)
25	Ben Honis (ITA)
26	Habila Awusayiman (CHN)
27	Şatlyk Hemelýäýew (TKM)
28	Mostafa El-Ders (EGY)
29	Steyn de Lange (RSA)
30	Kim Jae-gang (KOR)
31	Lukas Krasauskas (LTU)
32	Utah Mann (TGA)
33	Nishan Randhawa (CAN)
34	Thomas Barns (AUS)
35	Strahinja Despić (SRB)

Qualified for the 2024 Summer Olympics
