= Akhmed Tazhudinov =

Russian-Bahraini freestyle wrestler (born 2003)

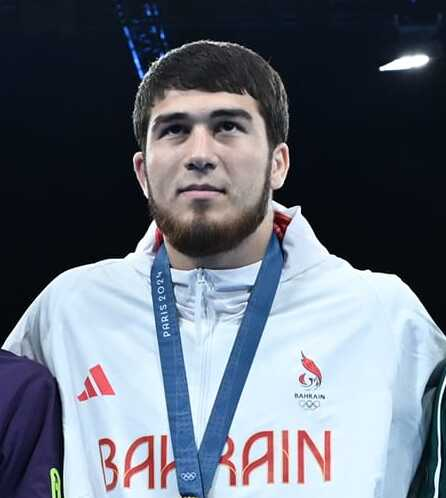
- Tazhudinov in 2024

Personal information
- Full name: Akhmed Magomedovich Tazhudinov
- Nationality: Russian; Bahraini
- Born: Ахмед Магомедович Тажудинов; 25 January 2003 (age 23) Gergebil, Dagestan, Russia
- Height: 1.89 m (6 ft 2 in)
- Weight: 97 kg (214 lb)

Sport
- Country: Russia (2018–2022); Bahrain (2022–present)
- Sport: Amateur wrestling
- Weight class: 97 kg
- Event: Freestyle
- Club: Abdulrashid Sadulaev Wrestling Club
- Coached by: Shamil Omarov

Achievements and titles
- Olympic finals: (gold) (2024)
- World finals: (gold) (2023)
- Regional finals: (gold) (2023) (gold) (2024)
Medal record
Men's freestyle wrestling
Representing Bahrain
Olympic Games
| Gold medal – first place | 2024 Paris | 97 kg |
World Championships
| Gold medal – first place | 2023 Belgrade | 97 kg |
| Bronze medal – third place | 2025 Zagreb | 97 kg |
Asian Championships
| Gold medal – first place | 2023 Astana | 97 kg |
| Gold medal – first place | 2024 Bishkek | 97 kg |
| Bronze medal – third place | 2026 Bishkek | 97 kg |
Asian Games
| Gold medal – first place | 2022 Hangzhou | 97 kg |
Yasar Dogu Tournament
| Gold medal – first place | 2024 Antalya | 97 kg |
Grand Prix
| Gold medal – first place | 2022 Taraz | 97 kg |
| Gold medal – first place | 2023 Bishkek | 97 kg |
| Gold medal – first place | 2025 Madrid | 97 kg |
| Gold medal – first place | 2025 Budapest | 97 kg |
Arab Championships
| Gold medal – first place | 2022 Alexandria | 125 kg |
Representing Dagestan
Russian Wrestling Championships
| Bronze medal – third place | 2022 Kyzyl | 97 kg |

Akhmed Magomedovich Tazhudinov (Russian: Ахмед Магомедович Тажудинов; born 25 January 2003) is a Russian-born Bahraini freestyle wrestler who competes at 97 kilograms. Representing Bahrain, Tazhudinov became the world champion and Asian champion in 2023, and is a multiple-time gold medalist in international tournaments. He won the gold medal in the men's 97 kg event at the 2024 Summer Olympics in Paris, France.

== Career ==
Tazhudinov won one of the bronze medals in the 97 kg category at the 2022 Russian Wrestling Championships. He has been competing for Bahrain since autumn 2022 and made his debut at the Dinmuhamed Kunayev Memorial International Tournament in Taraz, Kazakhstan, in early November 2022, where he won the tournament. A few days later, as part of the Bahrain team in Egypt, he won the Arab Championships.

On 13 April 2023 in Astana, he participated in the 2023 Asian Wrestling Championships and defeated China's Habila Awusayiman in the final to become the Asian champion. On 19 September 2023, he pinned Magomedkhan Magomedov in the finals of the 2023 World Wrestling Championships to win his first Senior World gold medal. In earlier rounds on the way to the title, he defeated Kyle Snyder and Abdulrashid Sadulaev, who between them had won every world or Olympic title at 97 kg dating back to the 2015 World Wrestling Championships.

In his bout with Kyle Snyder, Tazhudinov showed phenomenal wrestling and defeated him 10–0. Sadulaev was unable to continue the fight due to a neck injury and withdrew from the tournament.

A year later, Tazhudinov won the gold medal in the men's 97 kg event at the 2024 Summer Olympics in Paris, France. Following the competition, he underwent surgery to repair a separated AC joint in his right shoulder, which he had sustained at a training camp in Belarus a few weeks prior.

== Championships and achievements ==
Senior level

- 2022 Russian National Championships — 3rd
- 2023 World Championships — 1st
- 2023 Asian Championships — 1st
- 2024 Asian Championships — 1st
- 2024 Summer Olympics — Gold
- 2025 Polyák Imre & Varga János Memorial Tournament — 1st
- 2025 World Championships — 3rd

Junior level

- 2021 Dagestan state championships — 2nd
- 2021 Besik Kudukhov international — 3rd

== Freestyle record ==
Senior Freestyle Matches
| Res. | Record | Opponent | Score | Date | Event | Location |
RAF 07 at 215 lb for the vacant RAF Light Heavyweight Championship
| Loss | 42–7 | (United States) Kyle Snyder | 3–3 | 28 March 2026 | RAF 07 | (United States) Tampa, Florida |
RAF 03 at 285 lb
| Win | 42–6 | (United States) Anthony Cassioppi | Fall | 29 November 2025 | RAF 03 | (United States) Chicago, Illinois |
2025 Islamic Solidarity Games 5th at 97 kg
| Loss | 41–6 | (Azerbaijan) Magomedkhan Magomedov | Forfeit | 7–21 November 2025 | 2025 Islamic Solidarity Games | Riyadh, Saudi Arabia |
| Loss | 41–5 | (Kazakhstan) Rizabek Aitmukhan | TF 3–15 | 7–21 November 2025 | 2025 Islamic Solidarity Games | Riyadh, Saudi Arabia |
| Win | 41–4 | (Cameroon) Cedric Abossolo | Fall 8–0 | 7–21 November 2025 | 2025 Islamic Solidarity Games | Riyadh, Saudi Arabia |
| Win | 40–4 | (Uzbekistan) Sherzod Poyonov | TF 11–1 | 7–21 November 2025 | 2025 Islamic Solidarity Games | Riyadh, Saudi Arabia |
2025 World Championships (bronze) at 97 kg
| Win | 39–4 | (Bulgaria) Akhmed Magamaev | 13–10 | 13–21 September 2025 | 2025 World Championships | Zagreb, Croatia |
| Loss | 38–4 | (Iran) Amir Ali Azarpira | 2–5 | 13–21 September 2025 | 2025 World Championships | Zagreb, Croatia |
| Win | 38–3 | Magomed Kurbanov | 10–9 | 13–21 September 2025 | 2025 World Championships | Zagreb, Croatia |
| Win | 37–3 | (North Macedonia) Magomedgaji Nurov | TF 10–0 | 13–21 September 2025 | 2025 World Championships | Zagreb, Croatia |
2025 Polyák Imre & Varga János Memorial (gold) at 97 kg
| Win | 36–3 | (Poland) Zbigniew Baranowski | TF 11–0 | 17–20 July 2025 | 2025 Polyák Imre & Varga János Memorial | Budapest, Hungary |
| Win | 35–3 | (Georgia (country)) Merab Suleimanishvili | TF 10–0 | 17–20 July 2025 | 2025 Polyák Imre & Varga János Memorial | Budapest, Hungary |
| Win | 34–3 | (Belarus) Aliaksandr Hushtyn | TF 11–0 | 17–20 July 2025 | 2025 Polyák Imre & Varga János Memorial | Budapest, Hungary |
| Win | 33–3 | (France) Adlan Viskhanov | TF 14–2 | 17–20 July 2025 | 2025 Polyák Imre & Varga János Memorial | Budapest, Hungary |
2025 Asian Championships 13th at 97 kg
| Loss | 32–3 | (Iran) Mohammad Mobin Azimi | Forfeit | 25–30 March 2025 | 2025 Asian Continental Championships | Amman, Jordan |
2024 Summer Olympics (gold) at 97 kg
| Win | 32–2 | (Georgia (country)) Givi Matcharashvili | Fall 2–0 | 10–11 August 2024 | 2024 Summer Olympics | Paris, France |
| Win | 31–2 | (United States) Kyle Snyder | 6–4 | 10–11 August 2024 | 2024 Summer Olympics | Paris, France |
| Win | 30–2 | (Kazakhstan) Alisher Yergali | TF 14–2 | 10–11 August 2024 | 2024 Summer Olympics | Paris, France |
| Win | 29–2 | (Iran) Amir Ali Azarpira | 4–3 | 10–11 August 2024 | 2024 Summer Olympics | Paris, France |
2024 Asian Championships (gold) at 97 kg
| Win | 28–2 | (Kazakhstan) Rizabek Aitmukhan | 4–2 | 11 April 2024 | 2024 Asian Continental Championships | Bishkek, Kyrgyzstan |
| Win | 27–2 | (Iran) Mohammad Hossein Mohammadian | 8–2 | 11 April 2024 | 2024 Asian Continental Championships | Bishkek, Kyrgyzstan |
| Win | 26–2 | (Japan) Hibiki Ito | TF 10–0 | 11 April 2024 | 2024 Asian Continental Championships | Bishkek, Kyrgyzstan |
2024 Yasar Dogu Memorial (gold) at 97 kg
| Win | 25–2 | (United States) Jonathan Aiello | TF 10–0 | 9 March 2024 | 2024 Yasar Dogu Memorial International | Antalya, Turkey |
| Win | 24–2 | (Kazakhstan) Rizabek Aitmukhan | Fall 9–3 | 9 March 2024 | 2024 Yasar Dogu Memorial International | Antalya, Turkey |
| Win | 23–2 | (United States) Kollin Moore | TF 11–0 | 9 March 2024 | 2024 Yasar Dogu Memorial International | Antalya, Turkey |
| Win | 22–2 | (Mongolia) Ganbaatar Gankhuyag | 7–1 | 9 March 2024 | 2024 Yasar Dogu Memorial International | Antalya, Turkey |
2022 Asian Games (gold) at 97 kg
| Win | 21–2 | (Iran) Mojtaba Goleij | 6–1 | 6 October 2023 | 2022 Asian Games | Lin'an, China |
| Win | 20–2 | (South Korea) Seo Ju-hwan | 6–1 | 6 October 2023 | 2022 Asian Games | Lin'an, China |
| Win | 19–2 | (Kyrgyzstan) Kanybek Abdulkhairov | Fall 9–0 | 6 October 2023 | 2022 Asian Games | Lin'an, China |
| Win | 18–2 | (China) Habila Awusayiman | 7–3 | 6 October 2023 | 2022 Asian Games | Lin'an, China |
2023 World Championships (gold) at 97 kg
| Win | 17–2 | (Azerbaijan) Magomedkhan Magomedov | Fall 8–1 | 18–19 September 2023 | 2023 World Championships | Belgrade, Serbia |
| Win | 16–2 | (Russia) Abdulrashid Sadulaev | INJ (9–2) | 18–19 September 2023 | 2023 World Championships | Belgrade, Serbia |
| Win | 15–2 | (United States) Kyle Snyder | TF 11–0 | 18–19 September 2023 | 2023 World Championships | Belgrade, Serbia |
| Win | 14–2 | (Costa Rica) Maxwell Lacey | TF 10–0 | 18–19 September 2023 | 2023 World Championships | Belgrade, Serbia |
| Win | 13–2 | (Uzbekistan) Magomed Ibragimov | TF 10–0 | 18–19 September 2023 | 2023 World Championships | Belgrade, Serbia |
2023 K.U. Kozhomkul & R. Sanatbaev Memorial (gold) at 97 kg
| Win | 12–2 | (China) Habila Awusayiman | 10–1 | 3 June 2023 | 2023 Kaba Uulu Kozhomkul & Raatbek Sanatbaev Tournament | Bishkek, Kyrgyzstan |
| Win | 11–2 | (Uzbekistan) Magomed Ibragimov | 5–2 | 3 June 2023 | 2023 Kaba Uulu Kozhomkul & Raatbek Sanatbaev Tournament | Bishkek, Kyrgyzstan |
| Win | 10–2 | (Kazakhstan) Bekzat Urkimbay | 5–2 | 3 June 2023 | 2023 Kaba Uulu Kozhomkul & Raatbek Sanatbaev Tournament | Bishkek, Kyrgyzstan |
| Win | 9–2 | (Kazakhstan) Serik Bakytkhanov | TF 10–0 | 3 June 2023 | 2023 Kaba Uulu Kozhomkul & Raatbek Sanatbaev Tournament | Bishkek, Kyrgyzstan |
2023 Asian Continental Championships (gold) at 97 kg
| Win | 8–2 | (China) Habila Awusayiman | TF 11–0 | 13 April | 2023 Asian Continental Championships | Astana, Kazakhstan |
| Win | 7–2 | (Iran) Mojtaba Goleij | 13–8 | 13 April | 2023 Asian Continental Championships | Astana, Kazakhstan |
| Win | 6–2 | (Kazakhstan) Bekzat Urkimbay | Fall 7–0 | 13 April | 2023 Asian Continental Championships | Astana, Kazakhstan |
2023 Ibrahim Moustafa Memorial 7th at 97 kg
| Loss | 5–2 | (Hungary) Vladislav Baitcaev | 4–6 | 25 February 2023 | 2023 Ibrahim Moustafa Memorial | Alexandria, Egypt |
| Win | 5–1 | (China) Habila Awusayiman | 8–5 | 25 February 2023 | 2023 Ibrahim Moustafa Memorial | Alexandria, Egypt |
2022 Arab Championships (gold) at 125 kg
| Win | | (Egypt) Diaaeldin Kamal | INJ | 8 November 2022 | 2022 Arab Championships | Alexandria, Egypt |
| Win | 4–1 | (Iraq) Ahmed Aljamie | TF 11–0 | 8 November 2022 | 2022 Arab Championships | Alexandria, Egypt |
| Win | | (Kuwait) Abdelaziz Elsabaa | INJ | 8 November 2022 | 2022 Arab Championships | Alexandria, Egypt |
2022 Russian Nationals (bronze) at 97 kg
| Win | 3–1 | (Russia) David Dzugaev | 9–3 | 24–26 June 2022 | 2022 Russian National Championships | (Russia) Kyzyl, Tuva |
| Loss | 2–1 | (Russia) Aslanbek Sotiev | 5–9 | 24–26 June 2022 | 2022 Russian National Championships | (Russia) Kyzyl, Tuva |
| Win | 2–0 | (Russia) Maxim Tolmachev | 13–6 | 24–26 June 2022 | 2022 Russian National Championships | (Russia) Kyzyl, Tuva |
| Win | 1–0 | (Russia) Askhab Boltukaev | 4–1 | 24–26 June 2022 | 2022 Russian National Championships | (Russia) Kyzyl, Tuva |
