= Wrestling at the 2022 Asian Games =

- Venue: Lin'an Sports and Culture Centre
- Dates: 4–7 October 2023
- Competitors: 247 from 29 nations

Wrestling at the 2022 Asian Games was held at the Lin'an Sports and Culture Centre, Lin'an, China from 4 to 7 October 2023.

== Schedule ==
P	Preliminary rounds & Repechage	F	Finals

Event↓/Date →	4th Wed		5th Thu		6th Fri		7th Sat	
Men's freestyle 57 kg					P	F		
Men's freestyle 65 kg					P	F		
Men's freestyle 74 kg							P	F
Men's freestyle 86 kg							P	F
Men's freestyle 97 kg							P	F
Men's freestyle 125 kg							P	F
Men's Greco-Roman 60 kg	P	F						
Men's Greco-Roman 67 kg	P	F						
Men's Greco-Roman 77 kg	P	F						
Men's Greco-Roman 87 kg	P	F						
Men's Greco-Roman 97 kg			P	F				
Men's Greco-Roman 130 kg			P	F				
Women's freestyle 50 kg			P	F				
Women's freestyle 53 kg			P	F				
Women's freestyle 57 kg			P	F				
Women's freestyle 62 kg					P	F		
Women's freestyle 68 kg					P	F		
Women's freestyle 76 kg					P	F		

== Medalists ==
=== Men's freestyle ===
Event	Gold	Silver	Bronze
57 kg	Toshihiro Hasegawa; Japan	Han Chong-song; North Korea	Narmandakhyn Nasanbuyan; Mongolia
57 kg	Toshihiro Hasegawa; Japan	Han Chong-song; North Korea	Aman Sehrawat; India
65 kg	Tömör-Ochiryn Tulga; Mongolia	Rahman Amouzad; Iran	Kim Kwang-jin; North Korea
65 kg	Tömör-Ochiryn Tulga; Mongolia	Rahman Amouzad; Iran	Kaiki Yamaguchi; Japan
74 kg	Younes Emami; Iran	Kirin Kinoshita; Japan	Orozobek Toktomambetov; Kyrgyzstan
74 kg	Younes Emami; Iran	Kirin Kinoshita; Japan	Bekzod Abdurakhmonov; Uzbekistan
86 kg	Hassan Yazdani; Iran	Deepak Punia; India	Javrail Shapiev; Uzbekistan
86 kg	Hassan Yazdani; Iran	Deepak Punia; India	Döwletmyrat Orazgylyjow; Turkmenistan
97 kg	Akhmed Tazhudinov; Bahrain	Mojtaba Goleij; Iran	Habila Awusayiman; China
97 kg	Akhmed Tazhudinov; Bahrain	Mojtaba Goleij; Iran	Ganbaataryn Gankhuyag; Mongolia
125 kg	Amir Hossein Zare; Iran	Mönkhtöriin Lkhagvagerel; Mongolia	Aiaal Lazarev; Kyrgyzstan
125 kg	Amir Hossein Zare; Iran	Mönkhtöriin Lkhagvagerel; Mongolia	Buheeerdun; China

=== Men's Greco-Roman ===
Event	Gold	Silver	Bronze
60 kg	Zholaman Sharshenbekov; Kyrgyzstan	Ayata Suzuki; Japan	Chung Han-jae; South Korea
60 kg	Zholaman Sharshenbekov; Kyrgyzstan	Ayata Suzuki; Japan	Ri Se-ung; North Korea
67 kg	Katsuaki Endo; Japan	Meirzhan Shermakhanbet; Kazakhstan	Danial Sohrabi; Iran
67 kg	Katsuaki Endo; Japan	Meirzhan Shermakhanbet; Kazakhstan	Razzak Beishekeev; Kyrgyzstan
77 kg	Akzhol Makhmudov; Kyrgyzstan	Amin Kavianinejad; Iran	Azat Sadykov; Kazakhstan
77 kg	Akzhol Makhmudov; Kyrgyzstan	Amin Kavianinejad; Iran	Liu Rui; China
87 kg	Jalgasbay Berdimuratov; Uzbekistan	Nasser Alizadeh; Iran	Sunil Kumar; India
87 kg	Jalgasbay Berdimuratov; Uzbekistan	Nasser Alizadeh; Iran	Masato Sumi; Japan
97 kg	Mohammad Hadi Saravi; Iran	Li Yiming; China	Rustam Assakalov; Uzbekistan
97 kg	Mohammad Hadi Saravi; Iran	Li Yiming; China	Takahiro Tsuruda; Japan
130 kg	Amin Mirzazadeh; Iran	Meng Lingzhe; China	Kim Min-seok; South Korea
130 kg	Amin Mirzazadeh; Iran	Meng Lingzhe; China	Alimkhan Syzdykov; Kazakhstan

=== Women's freestyle ===
Event	Gold	Silver	Bronze
50 kg	Remina Yoshimoto; Japan	Kim Son-hyang; North Korea	Zhu Jiang; China
50 kg	Remina Yoshimoto; Japan	Kim Son-hyang; North Korea	Aktenge Keunimjaeva; Uzbekistan
53 kg	Akari Fujinami; Japan	Pang Qianyu; China	Antim Panghal; India
53 kg	Akari Fujinami; Japan	Pang Qianyu; China	Choe Hyo-gyong; North Korea
57 kg	Tsugumi Sakurai; Japan	Jong In-sun; North Korea	Hong Kexin; China
57 kg	Tsugumi Sakurai; Japan	Jong In-sun; North Korea	Laylokhon Sobirova; Uzbekistan
62 kg	Mun Hyon-gyong; North Korea	Nonoka Ozaki; Japan	Sonam Malik; India
62 kg	Mun Hyon-gyong; North Korea	Nonoka Ozaki; Japan	Aisuluu Tynybekova; Kyrgyzstan
68 kg	Zhou Feng; China	Nurzat Nurtaeva; Kyrgyzstan	Naruha Matsuyuki; Japan
68 kg	Zhou Feng; China	Nurzat Nurtaeva; Kyrgyzstan	Enkhsaikhany Delgermaa; Mongolia
76 kg	Aiperi Medet Kyzy; Kyrgyzstan	Zhamila Bakbergenova; Kazakhstan	Wang Juan; China
76 kg	Aiperi Medet Kyzy; Kyrgyzstan	Zhamila Bakbergenova; Kazakhstan	Kiran Bishnoi; India

== Medal table ==
Rank	Nation	Gold	Silver	Bronze	Total
1	Iran (IRI)	5	4	1	10
2	Japan (JPN)	5	3	4	12
3	Kyrgyzstan (KGZ)	3	1	4	8
4	China (CHN)	1	3	6	10
5	North Korea (PRK)	1	3	3	7
6	Mongolia (MGL)	1	1	3	5
7	Uzbekistan (UZB)	1	0	5	6
8	Bahrain (BRN)	1	0	0	1
9	Kazakhstan (KAZ)	0	2	2	4
10	India (IND)	0	1	5	6
11	South Korea (KOR)	0	0	2	2
12	Turkmenistan (TKM)	0	0	1	1
Totals (12 entries)		18	18	36	72

== Participating nations ==
A total of 247 athletes from 29 nations competed in wrestling at the 2022 Asian Games:

- Afghanistan (3)
- Bahrain (4)
- Cambodia (14)
- China (18)
- Chinese Taipei (5)
- India (18)
- Indonesia (6)
- Iran (12)
- Japan (18)
- Kazakhstan (18)
- Kuwait (1)
- Kyrgyzstan (15)
- Laos (1)
- Mongolia (12)
- Nepal (4)
- North Korea (8)
- Pakistan (4)
- Palestine (1)
- Philippines (3)
- Singapore (3)
- South Korea (18)
- Sri Lanka (1)
- Syria (2)
- Tajikistan (9)
- Thailand (11)
- Turkmenistan (9)
- Uzbekistan (18)
- Vietnam (10)
- Yemen (1)
