= Aleksandriyskaya =

Aleksandriyskaya Александрийская
- Stanitsa
- Location within Republic of Dagestan Location within Russia
- Coordinates: 43°54′N 47°07′E
- Country: Russia
- Region: Republic of Dagestan
- District: Kizlyarsky District
- Time zone: UTC+3:00

Aleksandriyskaya (Russian: Александрийская) is a rural locality (a stanitsa) and the administrative centre of Aleksandriysky Selsoviet, Kizlyarsky District, Republic of Dagestan, Russia. The population was 2,437 as of 2010. There are 13 streets.

== Geography ==
Aleksandriyskaya is located 42 km northeast of Kizlyar (the district's administrative centre) by road. Chernyayevka and Sangishi are the nearest rural localities.

== Nationalities ==
Avars, Russians, Dargins and Tabasarans live there.
