= Wrestling at the 2024 Summer Olympics – Men's freestyle 97 kg =

Men's freestyle 97 kg at the Games of the XXXIII Olympiad
- Venue: Grand Palais Éphémère
- Date: 10–11 August 2024
- Competitors: 16 from 16 nations

Medalists
1st place, gold medalist(s)		Akhmed Tazhudinov	Bahrain
2nd place, silver medalist(s)		Givi Matcharashvili	Georgia
3rd place, bronze medalist(s)		Magomedkhan Magomedov	Azerbaijan
3rd place, bronze medalist(s)		Amir Ali Azarpira	Iran

Men's freestyle 97 kilograms competition at the 2024 Summer Olympics in Paris, France, took place on 10–11 August 2024 at the Grand Palais Éphémère in Champ de Mars.

== Background ==
This is the 26th appearance of men's freestyle heavyweight event, debut as a demonstration in 1904, until 1908, it became official, it was appeared in every games, except for 1912.

- 1904: +71.7kg (demonstration)
- 1908: +73kg
- 1920: +80kg
- 1924-1960: +87kg
- 1964-1968: +97kg
- 1972-1996: 100kg
- 2000: 97kg
- 2004-2012: 96kg
- 2016-current: 97kg

Akhmed Tazhudinov won the event by defeating Givi Matcharashvili in the final, marking Bahrain's first ever podium finish in Olympic wrestling, Magomedkhan Magomedov and Amir Ali Azarpira won bronze medals with Azarpira going through repechage.

== Format ==
This freestyle wrestling competition consists of a single-elimination tournament, with a repechage used to determine the winner of two bronze medals. The two finalists face off for gold and silver medals. Each wrestler who loses to one of the two finalists moves into the repechage, culminating in a pair of bronze medal matches featuring the semifinal losers each facing the remaining repechage opponent from their half of the bracket.

== Rules ==
A typical bout consists of two halves of three minutes each separated by a 30-second break. The two competitors compete on a mat, which is nine meters in diameter. Wrestlers try to score points by executing various legal maneuvers. Points ranging from one to five are awarded by the mat referee depending on the degree of difficulty of the maneuvers. Points are also awarded to the opponent in case of infractions such as illegal holds, passivity etc. A wrestler is automatically disqualified if three cautions are awarded during a bout. Forcing an opponent's shoulders to the mat results in an instant victory by fall.

During the course of a match, if a wrestler builds a 10-point advantage over the opponent, the bout is stopped and the leader is declared as the winner by technical superiority. The total scores are totaled at the end of the stipulated six-minute period, and the wrestler with the maximum points wins. In case of a tie, the wrestler who has scored the last point is declared the winner. A competitor might also be declared a winner if the opponent does not turn up or is medically unfit to compete.

== Qualification ==
Sixteen quota places were available with each nation restricted to a maximum of one spot. Five quota places were awarded at the 2023 World Wrestling Championships, which took place from the 16th to 24th of September in Belgrade, Serbia. The finalists of each category in the four continental qualification tournaments (Asia, Europe, the Americas, and the joint Africa & Oceania) were awarded quota places. The remainder of the total quota was allocated at the 2024 World Wrestling Olympic Qualification Tournament, offering a minimum of three quota places.

== Schedule ==
All times are Central European Time (UTC+02:00)

Date	Time	Event
10 August 2024	11:30	Qualification rounds
10 August 2024	18:15	Semifinals
11 August 2024	11:00	Repechage
11 August 2024	19:30	Finals

== Results ==
Sixteen athletes qualified for the competition.

Legend

- F — Won by fall

=== Main bracket ===
Round of 16
Magomedkhan Magomedov (AZE)	9
Luis Miguel Pérez (DOM)	0
Radu Lefter (MDA)	2
Zbigniew Baranowski (POL)	8
Givi Matcharashvili (GEO)	12
Steyn de Lange (RSA)	2
Murazi Mchedlidze (UKR)	5
İbrahim Çiftçi (TUR)	1
Kyle Snyder (USA)	9
Habila Awusayiman (CHN)	5
Arturo Silot (CUB)	5
Erik Thiele (GER)	0
Alisher Yergali (KAZ)	6
Mostafa El-Ders (EGY)	2
Amir Ali Azarpira (IRI)	3
Akhmed Tazhudinov (BRN)	4

Quarterfinals
Magomedkhan Magomedov (AZE)	7
Zbigniew Baranowski (POL)	2
Givi Matcharashvili (GEO)	11
Murazi Mchedlidze (UKR)	0
Kyle Snyder (USA)	5^{F}
Arturo Silot (CUB)	0
Alisher Yergali (KAZ)	2
Akhmed Tazhudinov (BRN)	14

Semifinals
Magomedkhan Magomedov (AZE)	0
Givi Matcharashvili (GEO)	5
Kyle Snyder (USA)	4
Akhmed Tazhudinov (BRN)	6

Final
Givi Matcharashvili (GEO)	0
Akhmed Tazhudinov (BRN)	2^{F}

=== Repechage ===
Repechage
Steyn de Lange (RSA)	3
Murazi Mchedlidze (UKR)	5
Amir Ali Azarpira (IRI)	6
Alisher Yergali (KAZ)	1

Bronze medal matches
Murazi Mchedlidze (UKR)	0
Magomedkhan Magomedov (AZE)	10
Amir Ali Azarpira (IRI)	4
Kyle Snyder (USA)	1

== Final standing ==
Rank	Athlete
1st place, gold medalist(s)	Akhmed Tazhudinov (BRN)
2nd place, silver medalist(s)	Givi Matcharashvili (GEO)
3rd place, bronze medalist(s)	Magomedkhan Magomedov (AZE)
3rd place, bronze medalist(s)	Amir Ali Azarpira (IRI)
5	Murazi Mchedlidze (UKR)
5	Kyle Snyder (USA)
7	Alisher Yergali (KAZ)
8	Zbigniew Baranowski (POL)
9	Arturo Silot (CUB)
10	Steyn de Lange (RSA)
11	Habila Awusayiman (CHN)
12	Mustafa El-Ders (EGY)
13	Radu Lefter (MDA)
14	İbrahim Çiftçi (TUR)
15	Erik Thiele (GER)
16	Luis Miguel Pérez (DOM)
