= 2024 European Wrestling Championships – Men's freestyle 97 kg =

Wrestling competition

Men's freestyle 97 kg at the 2024 European Wrestling Championships
- Venue: Polyvalent Hall
- Location: Bucharest, Romania
- Dates: 16-17 February
- Competitors: 18

Medalists
gold medal	Givi Matcharashvili	Georgia
silver medal	Magomedkhan Magomedov	Azerbaijan
bronze medal	Vladislav Baitcaev	Hungary
bronze medal	İbrahim Çiftçi	Turkey

The men's freestyle 97 kg is a competition featured at the 2024 European Wrestling Championships, and was in Bucharest, Romania on February 16 and 17.

== Results ==
Legend

- F — Won by fall
- WO — Won by walkover

=== Final ===
Final
Magomedkhan Magomedov (AZE)	1
Givi Matcharashvili (GEO)	7

=== Top half ===
Round of 32
Batyrbek Tsakulov (SVK)	10
Ben Honis (ITA)	0

Round of 16
Magomedkhan Magomedov (AZE)	9
Florin Tripon (ROU)	1
Batyrbek Tsakulov (SVK)	7
Radosław Baran (POL)	1
Akhmed Bataev (BUL)	13
Sergey Sargsyan (ARM)	2
Vladislav Baitcaev (HUN)	WO
~~Abdulrashid Sadulaev (AIN)~~

Quarterfinals
Magomedkhan Magomedov (AZE)	13
Batyrbek Tsakulov (SVK)	2
Akhmed Bataev (BUL)	0
Vladislav Baitcaev (HUN)	5

Semifinals
Magomedkhan Magomedov (AZE)	7
Vladislav Baitcaev (HUN)	2

=== Bottom half ===
Round of 32
Erik Thiele (GER)	4
Magomedgaji Nurov (MKD)	3

Round of 16
Givi Matcharashvili (GEO)	13
Lukas Krasauskas (LTU)	2
Aliaksandr Hushtyn (AIN)	3
Radu Lefter (MDA)	3
Illia Archaia (UKR)	0
Erik Thiele (GER)	7
Adlan Viskhanov (FRA)	2
İbrahim Çiftçi (TUR)	9

Quarterfinals
Givi Matcharashvili (GEO)	4
Aliaksandr Hushtyn (AIN)	1
Erik Thiele (GER)	2
İbrahim Çiftçi (TUR)	4

Semifinals
Givi Matcharashvili (GEO)	7
İbrahim Çiftçi (TUR)	2

=== Repechage ===
Repechage round 2
Florin Tripon (ROU)	0
Batyrbek Tsakulov (SVK)	6
Lukas Krasauskas (LTU)	2
Aliaksandr Hushtyn (AIN)	12

Bronze medal match
Batyrbek Tsakulov (SVK)	1
Vladislav Baitcaev (HUN)	4
Aliaksandr Hushtyn (AIN)	5
İbrahim Çiftçi (TUR)	6

== Final standing ==
Rank	Athlete
1st place, gold medalist(s)	Givi Matcharashvili (GEO)
2nd place, silver medalist(s)	Magomedkhan Magomedov (AZE)
3rd place, bronze medalist(s)	Vladislav Baitcaev (HUN)
3rd place, bronze medalist(s)	İbrahim Çiftçi (TUR)
5	Batyrbek Tsakulov (SVK)
5	Aliaksandr Hushtyn (AIN)
7	Erik Thiele (GER)
8	Akhmed Bataev (BUL)
9	Lukas Krasauskas (LTU)
10	Radu Lefter (MDA)
11	Magomedgaji Nurov (MKD)
12	Adlan Viskhanov (FRA)
13	Sergey Sargsyan (ARM)
14	Radosław Baran (POL)
15	Florin Tripon (ROU)
16	Illia Archaia (UKR)
17	Ben Honis (ITA)
—	Abdulrashid Sadulaev (AIN)
