= Liu Minghu =

Chinese freestyle wrestler

Personal information
- Nationality: China
- Born: 刘明虎; 28 July 1998 (age 28) Beihai, China
- Height: 158 cm (5 ft 2 in)

Sport
- Country: China
- Sport: Amateur wrestling
- Weight class: 61 kg
- Event: Freestyle

Achievements and titles
- Regional finals: (silver) (2019) (silver) (2023)
Medal record
Men's freestyle wrestling
Representing China
Asian Championships
Silver medal – second place	2019 Xi'an	61 kg
Silver medal – second place	2023 Astana	61 kg
Olympic Qualification Tournament
Silver medal – second place	2021 Almaty	57 kg
Waclaw Ziolkowski Memorial
Bronze medal – third place	2022 Warsaw	61 kg
World U23 Championships
Bronze medal – third place	2018 Bucharest	61 kg

Liu Minghu (born 28 July 1998) is a Chinese freestyle wrestler. He is a silver medalist at the Asian Wrestling Championships. He competed in the men's 57 kg event at the 2020 Summer Olympics held in Tokyo, Japan.

== Career ==
He represented China at the 2018 Asian Games in Jakarta, Indonesia in the men's freestyle 57 kg event. In 2019, he won the silver medal in the men's 61 kg event at the Asian Wrestling Championships held in Xi'an, China.

He qualified at the 2021 Asian Wrestling Olympic Qualification Tournament to represent China at the 2020 Summer Olympics in Tokyo, Japan.

He competed in the 61 kg event at the 2022 World Wrestling Championships held in Belgrade, Serbia.

== Achievements ==
Year	Tournament	Location	Result	Event
2019	Asian Championships	Xi'an, China	2nd	Freestyle 61 kg
2023	Asian Championships	Astana, Kazakhstan	2nd	Freestyle 61 kg
