= 2023 European Wrestling Championships – Men's freestyle 97 kg =

Wrestling competition

Men's freestyle 97 kg at the 2023 European Wrestling Championships
- Venue: Arena Zagreb
- Location: Zagreb, Croatia
- Dates: 17-18 April
- Competitors: 16

Medalists
gold medal	Givi Matcharashvili	Georgia
silver medal	Magomedkhan Magomedov	Azerbaijan
bronze medal	İbrahim Çiftçi	Turkey
bronze medal	Vladislav Baitcaev	Hungary

The Men's Freestyle 97 kg is a competition featured at the 2023 European Wrestling Championships, and was held in Zagreb, Croatia on April 17 and 18.

== Results ==
Legend

- F — Won by fall
- WO — Won by walkover

Round of 16
Batyrbek Tsakulov (SVK)	4
Murazi Mchedlidze (UKR)	6
Erik Thiele (GER)	8
Sergey Sargsyan (ARM)	0
Lukas Krasauskas (LTU)	0
İbrahim Çiftçi (TUR)	10
Radu Lefter (MDA)	0
Givi Matcharashvili (GEO)	11
Magomedkhan Magomedov (AZE)	12
Ben Honis (ITA)	2
Georgi Dimitrov (BUL)	0
Samuel Scherrer (SUI)	6
Zbigniew Baranowski (POL)	5
Magomedgadji Nurov (MKD)	2
~~Egzon Shala (KOS)~~
Vladislav Baitcaev (HUN)	WO

Quarterfinals
Murazi Mchedlidze (UKR)	4
Erik Thiele (GER)	4
İbrahim Çiftçi (TUR)	3
Givi Matcharashvili (GEO)	4
Magomedkhan Magomedov (AZE)	11
Samuel Scherrer (SUI)	0
Zbigniew Baranowski (POL)	0
Vladislav Baitcaev (HUN)	10

Semifinals
Murazi Mchedlidze (UKR)	1
Givi Matcharashvili (GEO)	9
Magomedkhan Magomedov (AZE)	6
Vladislav Baitcaev (HUN)	0

Final
Givi Matcharashvili (GEO)	4
Magomedkhan Magomedov (AZE)	3

Repechage round 1
Radu Lefter (MDA)	0
İbrahim Çiftçi (TUR)	11
Ben Honis (ITA)	5
Samuel Scherrer (SUI)	1

Bronze medal match
İbrahim Çiftçi (TUR)	12
Murazi Mchedlidze (UKR)	3
Ben Honis (ITA)	6
Vladislav Baitcaev (HUN)	10

== Final standing ==
Rank	Athlete
1st place, gold medalist(s)	Givi Matcharashvili (GEO)
2nd place, silver medalist(s)	Magomedkhan Magomedov (AZE)
3rd place, bronze medalist(s)	İbrahim Çiftçi (TUR)
3rd place, bronze medalist(s)	Vladislav Baitcaev (HUN)
5	Murazi Mchedlidze (UKR)
5	Ben Honis (ITA)
7	Erik Thiele (GER)
8	Samuel Scherrer (SUI)
9	Zbigniew Baranowski (POL)
10	Batyrbek Tsakulov (SVK)
11	Magomedgadji Nurov (MKD)
12	Georgi Dimitrov (BUL)
13	Sergey Sargsyan (ARM)
14	Lukas Krasauskas (LTU)
15	Radu Lefter (MDA)
—	Egzon Shala (KOS)
