= Arash Yoshida =

Japanese freestyle wrestler

Arash Yoshida 吉田アラシ
Personal information
- Nationality: Japan
- Born: 11 January 2004 (age 22) Chiba Prefecture, Japan
- Height: 1.80 m (5 ft 11 in)
- Weight: 97 kg (214 lb; 15.3 st)

Sport
- Country: Japan
- Sport: Wrestling
- Weight class: 97 kg
- Event: Freestyle
Medal record
Men's freestyle wrestling
Representing Japan
World Championships
| Silver medal – second place | 2026 Astana | 97 kg |
| Bronze medal – third place | 2025 Zagreb | 97 kg |
Asian Games
| Bronze medal – third place | 2026 Aichi–Nagoya | 97 kg |
Asian Championships
| Gold medal – first place | 2023 Astana | 92 kg |
| Gold medal – first place | 2025 Amman | 97 kg |
| Gold medal – first place | 2026 Bishkek | 97 kg |
World U23 Championships
| Gold medal – first place | 2025 Novi Sad | 97 kg |
Grand Prix
| Gold medal – first place | 2025 Tirana | 97 kg |
Japan National Championships
| Gold medal – first place | 2023 Tokyo | 97 kg |
| Gold medal – first place | 2024 Tokyo | 97 kg |

Arashi Yoshida (born 11 January 2004) is an Iranian-Japanese freestyle wrestler. He won the gold medal at the 2023 Asian Wrestling Championships, the 2025 Asian Wrestling Championships and the 2026 Asian Wrestling Championships.

== Biography ==
Arash Yoshida was born on 11 January 2004, in Chiba Prefecture, Japan.

Javad Esfanjani, the father of Arash Yoshida, is of Mazanderani origin. He is from the Mazanderani-speaking area of Zarindasht in Firuzkuh. He moved to Karaj at the age of ten, and Mazanderani language is his mother tongue.
