= İbrahim Çiftçi =

Turkish freestyle wrestler

Personal information
- Born: 1 December 1997 (age 28) Erzurum, Turkey
- Height: 1.85 m (6 ft 1 in)
- Weight: 97 kg (214 lb)

Sport
- Country: Turkey
- Sport: Amateur wrestling
- Event: Freestyle
- Club: Ankara ASKI
Medal record
Men's freestyle wrestling
Representing Turkey
European Championships
Bronze medal – third place	2023 Zagreb	97 kg
Bronze medal – third place	2024 Bucharest	97 kg
Yasar Dogu Tournament
Gold medal – first place	2023 Istanbul	97 kg
Bronze medal – third place	2021 Istanbul	97 kg
Grand Prix
Bronze medal – third place	2024 Budapest	97 kg
European U23 Championship
Gold medal – first place	2019 Novi Sad	97 kg
World Juniors Championships
Bronze medal – third place	2017 Tampere	97 kg

İbrahim Çiftçi (born 1 December 1997) is a Turkish freestyle wrestler, competing in the 97 kg division. He is a member of Ankara Aski Spor Club. He is a two-time bronze medalist at the European Wrestling Championships. He competed at the 2024 Summer Olympics in Paris, France.

== Career ==
In 2017, he won the bronze medal in the men's freestyle 97 kg event at the 2017 World Juniors Wrestling Championships held in Tampere, Finland.

In 2019, he won the gold medal in the men's 97 kg event at the 2019 European U23 Wrestling Championship held in Novi Sad, Serbia.

In 2023, he won one of the bronze medals in the men's 97 kg event at the 2023 European Wrestling Championships held in Zagreb, Croatia. İbrahim Çiftçi defeated Ukraine's Murazi Mchedlidze 12–3 in the bronze medal match and won the bronze medal.

He won one of the bronze medals in the men's 97 kg event at the 2024 European Wrestling Championships held in Bucharest, Romania. He competed in the men's 97 kg event at the 2024 Summer Olympics in Paris, France.
