= Magomed Sharipov =

Russia born Bahraini freestyle wrestler

Personal information
- Full name: Magomed Magomedovich Sharipov
- Born: Магомед Магомедович Шарипов; 6 August 2002 (age 24) Makhachkala, Dagestan, Russia
- Height: 1.85 m (6 ft 1 in)
- Weight: 86 kg (190 lb; 13.5 st)

Sport
- Country: Russia (2019–2022); Bahrain (2022–present)
- Sport: Amateur wrestling
- Weight class: 86 kg
- Event: Freestyle
- Club: Abdulrashid Sadulaev Wrestling Club
- Coached by: Shamil Omarov
Medal record
Men's freestyle wrestling
Representing Bahrain
Asian Championships
Silver medal – second place	2026 Bishkek	92 kg
Bronze medal – third place	2023 Astana	92 kg
Bronze medal – third place	2024 Bishkek	92 kg
World U23 Championships
Bronze medal – third place	2025 Novi Sad	92 kg
Grand Prix
Gold medal – first place	2022 Taraz	92 kg
Gold medal – first place	2023 Bishkek	86 kg
Arab Championships
Gold medal – first place	2022 Alexandria	92 kg
Representing Dagestan
Russian Wrestling Championships
Bronze medal – third place	2022 Kyzyl	92 kg

Magomed Sharipov (Russian: Магомед Магомедович Шарипов; born 6 August 2002) is a Russian-born Bahraini wrestler.

== Career ==
He is the younger brother of wrestler Shamil Sharipov. On 27 January 2021 in the final of the Dagestan Junior Championships he lost to Zagid Karimov. On 7 March 2021 took the 2nd place at the SCFD Junior Championship in Khasavyurt, losing in the final to Zagid Karimov. 21 January 2022 in Khasavyurt won the Dagestan Junior Championships. On 24 February 2022, he won a bronze medal at the Dagestan Championship in Kaspiysk. On 27 March 2022 in Kaspiysk he won the Russian Junior Championships. On 20 May 2022 in Moscow in the final of the Ivan Poddubny Memorial he lost to Magomed Kurbanov.

In the autumn of 2022, he began representing Bahrain. On 5 November 2022, he won the international tournament in memory of Dinmukhamed Kunayev in Taraz, Kazakhstan. A few days later, as part of the Bahrain team in Egypt, he won the Arab Championships. On 14 April 2023 in Astana, defeating Mirlan Chynybekov from Kyrgyzstan in the fight for 3rd place, he won the bronze medal of the Asian Championships.
