= Chernyayevka =

Chernyayevka Черняевка
- Selo
- Location within Republic of Dagestan Location within Russia
- Coordinates: 43°56′N 47°01′E
- Country: Russia
- Region: Republic of Dagestan
- District: Kizlyarsky District
- Time zone: UTC+3:00

Chernyayevka (Russian: Черняевка) is a rural locality (a selo) and the administrative centre of Chernyayevsky Selsoviet, Kizlyarsky District, Republic of Dagestan, Russia. The population was 2,279 as of 2010. There are 23 streets.

== Geography ==
Chernyayevka is located 32 km northeast of Kizlyar (the district's administrative centre) by road. Sangishi, Sar-Sar and Novaya Serebryakovka are the nearest rural localities.

== Nationalities ==
Lezgins, Russians, Avars, Dargins, Tabasarans, Aghuls, Laks, Azerbaijanis and Chechens live there.
