= Zhuomalaga =

Chinese freestyle wrestler (born 2001)

Personal information
- Native name: 卓玛拉嘎
- Born: 2001 (age 24–25)

Sport
- Country: China
- Sport: Amateur wrestling
- Weight class: 59 kg
- Event: Freestyle
Medal record
Women's freestyle wrestling
Representing China
Asian Championships
Silver medal – second place	2023 Astana	59 kg

Zhuomalaga (born 2001) is a Chinese freestyle wrestler of Tibetan ethnicity. She won a silver medal in the 59 kg event at the 2023 Asian Wrestling Championships.

== Background ==
Zhuomalaga is of Tibetan ethnicity. She is trained by Xiluo Zhuoma, who won a gold medal at the 2011 World Wrestling Championships.
