= Sangishi =

Sangishi Сангиши Сангиси
- Selo
- Location within Republic of Dagestan Location within Russia
- Coordinates: 43°53′N 47°01′E
- Country: Russia
- Region: Republic of Dagestan
- District: Kizlyarsky District
- Time zone: UTC+3:00

Sangishi (Russian: Сангиши; Nogai: Сангиси, Sangisi) is a rural locality (a selo) in Aleksandriysky Selsoviet, Kizlyarsky District, Republic of Dagestan, Russia. The population was 467 as of 2010. There are 4 streets.

== Geography ==
Sangishi is located 41 km northeast of Kizlyar (the district's administrative centre) by road. Chernyayevka and Aleksandriyskaya are the nearest rural localities.

== Nationalities ==
Nogais and Dargins live there.
