= 2023 Asian Wrestling Championships =

Wrestling competition held in Astana, Kazakhstan

- Host city: Astana, Kazakhstan
- Dates: 9–14 April 2023
- Stadium: Zhaksylyk Ushkempirov Martial Arts Palace

Champions
- Freestyle: Kazakhstan
- Greco-Roman: Iran
- Women: Japan

The 2023 Asian Wrestling Championships was the 19th edition of Asian Wrestling Championships of combined events, and took place from 9 to 14 April in Astana, Kazakhstan. The event was previously scheduled to be held in New Delhi, India.

== Medal table ==
Rank	Nation	Gold	Silver	Bronze	Total
1	Kazakhstan	8	3	9	20
2	Japan	6	4	10	20
3	Iran	6	4	3	13
4	Kyrgyzstan	4	3	6	13
5	China	2	4	6	12
6	Uzbekistan	1	5	5	11
7	India	1	3	11	15
8	Mongolia	1	3	5	9
9	Bahrain	1	0	2	3
10	South Korea	0	1	1	2
Totals (10 entries)		30	30	58	118

== Team ranking ==
Rank	Men's freestyle		Men's Greco-Roman		Women's freestyle	
Rank	Team	Points	Team	Points	Team	Points
1	Kazakhstan	179	Iran	201	Japan	205
2	Japan	129	Kazakhstan	165	China	149
3	Iran	124	Kyrgyzstan	133	India	143
4	Mongolia	120	Uzbekistan	121	Kazakhstan	141
5	Uzbekistan	118	India	120	Uzbekistan	119
6	Kyrgyzstan	109	Japan	116	Mongolia	117
7	India	99	China	101	Kyrgyzstan	101
8	China	91	South Korea	70	Chinese Taipei	48
9	Bahrain	61	Turkmenistan	40	South Korea	41
10	South Korea	46	Tajikistan	30	Vietnam	18

== Medal summary ==
=== Men's freestyle ===
Event	Gold	Silver	Bronze
57 kg	Aman Sehrawat; India	Almaz Smanbekov; Kyrgyzstan	Rikuto Arai; Japan
57 kg	Aman Sehrawat; India	Almaz Smanbekov; Kyrgyzstan	Rakhat Kalzhan; Kazakhstan
61 kg	Taiyrbek Zhumashbek Uulu; Kyrgyzstan	Liu Minghu; China	Tümenbilegiin Tüvshintulga; Mongolia
61 kg	Taiyrbek Zhumashbek Uulu; Kyrgyzstan	Liu Minghu; China	Yasin Rezaei; Iran
65 kg	Rahman Amouzad; Iran	Tömör-Ochiryn Tulga; Mongolia	Ryoma Anraku; Japan
65 kg	Rahman Amouzad; Iran	Tömör-Ochiryn Tulga; Mongolia	Ulukbek Zholdoshbekov; Kyrgyzstan
70 kg	Sanzhar Doszhanov; Kazakhstan	Zafarbek Otakhonov; Uzbekistan	Orozobek Toktomambetov; Kyrgyzstan
70 kg	Sanzhar Doszhanov; Kazakhstan	Zafarbek Otakhonov; Uzbekistan	Yoshinosuke Aoyagi; Japan
74 kg	Darkhan Yessengali; Kazakhstan	Kirin Kinoshita; Japan	Olonbayaryn Süldkhüü; Mongolia
74 kg	Darkhan Yessengali; Kazakhstan	Kirin Kinoshita; Japan	Magomedrasul Asluev; Bahrain
79 kg	Bolat Sakayev; Kazakhstan	Bekzod Abdurakhmonov; Uzbekistan	Deepak Mirka; India
79 kg	Bolat Sakayev; Kazakhstan	Bekzod Abdurakhmonov; Uzbekistan	Amir Hossein Kavousi; Iran
86 kg	Azamat Dauletbekov; Kazakhstan	Alireza Karimi; Iran	Bobur Islomov; Uzbekistan
86 kg	Azamat Dauletbekov; Kazakhstan	Alireza Karimi; Iran	Hayato Ishiguro; Japan
92 kg	Arash Yoshida; Japan	Rizabek Aitmukhan; Kazakhstan	Ganbaataryn Gankhuyag; Mongolia
92 kg	Arash Yoshida; Japan	Rizabek Aitmukhan; Kazakhstan	Magomed Sharipov; Bahrain
97 kg	Akhmed Tazhudinov; Bahrain	Habila Awusayiman; China	Makhsud Veysalov; Uzbekistan
97 kg	Akhmed Tazhudinov; Bahrain	Habila Awusayiman; China	Mojtaba Goleij; Iran
125 kg	Mönkhtöriin Lkhagvagerel; Mongolia	Yusup Batirmurzaev; Kazakhstan	Buheeerdun; China
125 kg	Mönkhtöriin Lkhagvagerel; Mongolia	Yusup Batirmurzaev; Kazakhstan	Anirudh Gulia; India

=== Men's Greco-Roman ===
Event	Gold	Silver	Bronze
55 kg	Pouya Dadmarz; Iran	Rupin Gahlawat; India	Amangali Bekbolatov; Kazakhstan
55 kg	Pouya Dadmarz; Iran	Rupin Gahlawat; India	Ikhtiyor Botirov; Uzbekistan
60 kg	Zholaman Sharshenbekov; Kyrgyzstan	Chung Han-jae; South Korea	Maito Kawana; Japan
60 kg	Zholaman Sharshenbekov; Kyrgyzstan	Chung Han-jae; South Korea	Cao Liguo; China
63 kg	Iman Mohammadi; Iran	Shermukhammad Sharibjanov; Uzbekistan	Neeraj Chhikara; India
63 kg	Iman Mohammadi; Iran	Shermukhammad Sharibjanov; Uzbekistan	Mukhamedali Mamurbek; Kazakhstan
67 kg	Abror Atabaev; Uzbekistan	Kyotaro Sogabe; Japan	Razzak Beishekeev; Kyrgyzstan
67 kg	Abror Atabaev; Uzbekistan	Kyotaro Sogabe; Japan	Almat Kebispayev; Kazakhstan
72 kg	Ibragim Magomadov; Kazakhstan	Sajjad Imentalab; Iran	Adilkhan Nurlanbekov; Kyrgyzstan
72 kg	Ibragim Magomadov; Kazakhstan	Sajjad Imentalab; Iran	Vikas Dalal; India
77 kg	Akzhol Makhmudov; Kyrgyzstan	Amin Kavianinejad; Iran	Kodai Sakuraba; Japan
77 kg	Akzhol Makhmudov; Kyrgyzstan	Amin Kavianinejad; Iran	Liu Rui; China
82 kg	Dias Kalen; Kazakhstan	Alireza Mohmadi; Iran	Yuya Maeta; Japan
82 kg	Dias Kalen; Kazakhstan	Alireza Mohmadi; Iran	Rohit Dahiya; India
87 kg	Nasser Alizadeh; Iran	Nursultan Tursynov; Kazakhstan	Sunil Kumar; India
87 kg	Nasser Alizadeh; Iran	Nursultan Tursynov; Kazakhstan	Jalgasbay Berdimuratov; Uzbekistan
97 kg	Mehdi Bali; Iran	Uzur Dzhuzupbekov; Kyrgyzstan	Olzhas Syrlybay; Kazakhstan
97 kg	Mehdi Bali; Iran	Uzur Dzhuzupbekov; Kyrgyzstan	Yuta Nara; Japan
130 kg	Amin Mirzazadeh; Iran	Meng Lingzhe; China	Roman Kim; Kyrgyzstan
130 kg	Amin Mirzazadeh; Iran	Meng Lingzhe; China	Alimkhan Syzdykov; Kazakhstan

=== Women's freestyle ===
Event	Gold	Silver	Bronze
50 kg	Remina Yoshimoto; Japan	Jasmina Immaeva; Uzbekistan	Cheon Mi-ran; South Korea
50 kg	Remina Yoshimoto; Japan	Jasmina Immaeva; Uzbekistan	Feng Ziqi; China
53 kg	Akari Fujinami; Japan	Antim Panghal; India	Aktenge Keunimjaeva; Uzbekistan
53 kg	Akari Fujinami; Japan	Antim Panghal; India	Bat-Ochiryn Bolortuyaa; Mongolia
55 kg	Pang Qianyu; China	Chinboldyn Otgontuyaa; Mongolia	Marina Sedneva; Kazakhstan
55 kg	Pang Qianyu; China	Chinboldyn Otgontuyaa; Mongolia	Rino Kataoka; Japan
57 kg	Sae Nanjo; Japan	Laylokhon Sobirova; Uzbekistan	Nilufar Raimova; Kazakhstan
57 kg	Sae Nanjo; Japan	Laylokhon Sobirova; Uzbekistan	Anshu Malik; India
59 kg	Yui Sakano; Japan	Zhuomalaga; China	Kalmira Bilimbek Kyzy; Kyrgyzstan
59 kg	Yui Sakano; Japan	Zhuomalaga; China	None awarded
62 kg	Aisuluu Tynybekova; Kyrgyzstan	Pürevdorjiin Orkhon; Mongolia	Sonam Malik; India
62 kg	Aisuluu Tynybekova; Kyrgyzstan	Pürevdorjiin Orkhon; Mongolia	Nonoka Ozaki; Japan
65 kg	Long Jia; China	Mahiro Yoshitake; Japan	Manisha Bhanwala; India
65 kg	Long Jia; China	Mahiro Yoshitake; Japan	None awarded
68 kg	Ami Ishii; Japan	Nisha Dahiya; India	Yelena Shalygina; Kazakhstan
68 kg	Ami Ishii; Japan	Nisha Dahiya; India	Zhou Feng; China
72 kg	Zhamila Bakbergenova; Kazakhstan	Sumire Niikura; Japan	Enkh-Amaryn Davaanasan; Mongolia
72 kg	Zhamila Bakbergenova; Kazakhstan	Sumire Niikura; Japan	Reetika Hooda; India
76 kg	Elmira Syzdykova; Kazakhstan	Aiperi Medet Kyzy; Kyrgyzstan	Wang Juan; China
76 kg	Elmira Syzdykova; Kazakhstan	Aiperi Medet Kyzy; Kyrgyzstan	Priya Malik; India

== Participating nations ==
331 competitors from 22 nations competed.

- Bahrain (4)
- China (30)
- Chinese Taipei (9)
- India (30)
- Iran (20)
- Iraq (7)
- Japan (30)
- Jordan (6)
- Kazakhstan (30)
- Kyrgyzstan (28)
- Mongolia (20)
- Pakistan (3)
- Philippines (3)
- Qatar (1)
- Singapore (10)
- South Korea (26)
- Sri Lanka (5)
- Tajikistan (13)
- Turkmenistan (18)
- Uzbekistan (30)
- Vietnam (7)
- Yemen (1)
