= Magomedkhan Magomedov =

Russian freestyle wrestler

Magomedkhan Magomedov Магомедхан Магомедов
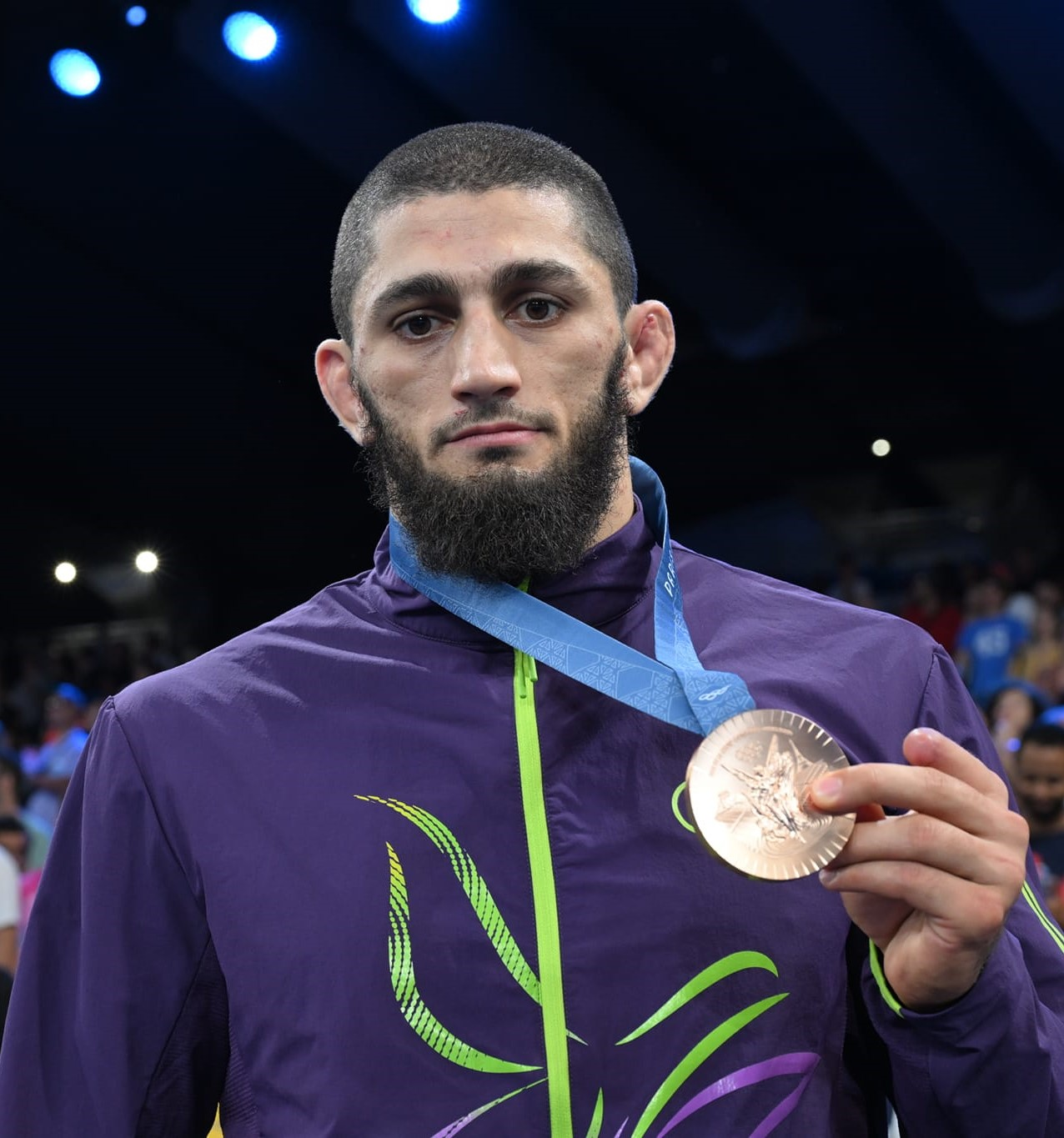
- Magomedov at the 2024 Summer Olympics

Personal information
- Full name: Magomedkhan Magomedovich Magomedov
- National team: Azerbaijan
- Citizenship: Azerbaijani; Russian
- Born: 27 January 1998 (age 28) Aleksandriyskaya, Dagestan, Russia
- Weight: 97 kg (214 lb)

Sport
- Country: Russia; Azerbaijan (since 2022)
- Sport: Sport wrestling
- Event: Freestyle
Medal record
Men's freestyle wrestling
Representing Azerbaijan
Olympic Games
Bronze medal – third place	2024 Paris	97 kg
World Championships
Silver medal – second place	2023 Belgrade	97 kg
Bronze medal – third place	2022 Belgrade	97 kg
European Championships
Gold medal – first place	2022 Budapest	97 kg
Silver medal – second place	2023 Zagreb	97 kg
Silver medal – second place	2024 Bucharest	97 kg
Islamic Solidarity Games
Bronze medal – third place	2025 Riyadh	97 kg
Dan Kolov & Nikola Petrov Tournament
Gold medal – first place	2022 Veliko Tarnovo	97 kg
Grand Prix
Gold medal – first place	2025 Vladikavkaz	125 kg
Silver medal – second place	2023 Budapest	97 kg
Silver medal – second place	2024 Budapest	97 kg
Silver medal – second place	2026 Grozny	125 kg
Silver medal – second place	2026 Vladikavkaz	125 kg
Bronze medal – third place	2023 Zagreb	97 kg
Representing Russia
Golden Grand Prix Ivan Yarygin
Gold medal – first place	2021 Krasnoyarsk	97 kg
Silver medal – second place	2020 Krasnoyarsk	97 kg
Junior World Championships
Gold medal – first place	2018 Trnava	97 kg

Magomedkhan Magomedovich Magomedov (Azerbaijani: Maqomedxan Maqomedoviç Maqomedov, Russian: Магомедхан Магомедович Магомедов; born 27 January 1998) is a Russian-Azerbaijani freestyle wrestler who currently competes at 97 kilograms and represents Dagestan in the national circuit. Magomedov won one of the bronze medals at the 2022 World Wrestling Championships in Belgrade. The 2018 Junior World Champion, Magomedov was the Golden Grand Prix Ivan Yarygin winner in 2021 and the silver medalist in 2020.

He won one of the bronze medals in the men's 97 kg event at the 2024 Summer Olympics in Paris, France.

== Achievements ==
Year	Competition	Venue	Position	Event	Notes
Representing Russia
2020	Golden Grand Prix Ivan Yarygin	Krasnoyarsk, Russia	2nd	Freestyle 97 kg	
2021	Golden Grand Prix Ivan Yarygin	Krasnoyarsk, Russia	1st	Freestyle 97 kg	
Representing Azerbaijan
2022	European Championships	Budapest, Hungary	1st	Freestyle 97 kg	
