= Wrestling at the 2022 Asian Games – Men's freestyle 97 kg =

Men's freestyle 97 kg at the 2022 Asian Games
- Venue: Lin'an Sports and Culture Centre
- Date: 7 October 2023
- Competitors: 15 from 15 nations

Medalists
gold medal	Akhmed Tazhudinov	Bahrain
silver medal	Mojtaba Goleij	Iran
bronze medal	Habila Awusayiman	China
bronze medal	Ganbaataryn Gankhuyag	Mongolia

The men's freestyle 97 kilograms wrestling competition at the 2022 Asian Games in Hangzhou was held on 6 October 2023 at the Lin'an Sports and Culture Centre.

This freestyle wrestling competition consists of a single-elimination tournament, with a repechage used to determine the winner of two bronze medals. The two finalists face off for gold and silver medals. Each wrestler who loses to one of the two finalists moves into the repechage, culminating in a pair of bronze medal matches featuring the semifinal losers each facing the remaining repechage opponent from their half of the bracket.

== Schedule ==
All times are China Standard Time (UTC+08:00)

Date	Time	Event
Saturday, 7 October 2023	10:00	1/8 finals
Saturday, 7 October 2023	10:00	1/4 finals
Saturday, 7 October 2023	10:00	Semifinals
Saturday, 7 October 2023	10:00	Repechages
Saturday, 7 October 2023	17:00	Finals

== Results ==
Legend

- F — Won by fall
- WO — Won by walkover

=== Main bracket ===
1/8 finals
Şatlyk Hemelýäýew (TKM)	8
Mo Sari (CAM)	2
Kanybek Abdulkhairov (KGZ)	10
Sardar Wali Naderi (AFG)	0
Habila Awusayiman (CHN)	3
Akhmed Tazhudinov (BRN)	7
Takashi Ishiguro (JPN)	8
Rahmonjon Mahmadbekov (TJK)	0
Vicky Hooda (IND)	0
Alisher Yergali (KAZ)	10
Magomed Ibragimov (UZB)	7
Mojtaba Goleij (IRI)	13
Ngô Văn Lâm (VIE)
Ganbaataryn Gankhuyag (MGL)	WO

1/4 finals
Seo Ju-hwan (KOR)	6
Şatlyk Hemelýäýew (TKM)	0
Kanybek Abdulkhairov (KGZ)	0
Akhmed Tazhudinov (BRN)	9^{F}
Takashi Ishiguro (JPN)	2
Alisher Yergali (KAZ)	4
Mojtaba Goleij (IRI)	4
Ganbaataryn Gankhuyag (MGL)	2

Semifinals
Seo Ju-hwan (KOR)	1
Akhmed Tazhudinov (BRN)	6
Alisher Yergali (KAZ)	1
Mojtaba Goleij (IRI)	3

Gold medal match
Akhmed Tazhudinov (BRN)	6
Mojtaba Goleij (IRI)	1

=== Repechage ===
Repechage round 1
Habila Awusayiman (CHN)	12
Kanybek Abdulkhairov (KGZ)	2
Magomed Ibragimov (UZB)	4
Ganbaataryn Gankhuyag (MGL)	14

Bronze medal matches
Habila Awusayiman (CHN)	2
Seo Ju-hwan (KOR)	1
Ganbaataryn Gankhuyag (MGL)	8
Alisher Yergali (KAZ)	1

== Final standing ==
Rank	Athlete
1st place, gold medalist(s)	Akhmed Tazhudinov (BRN)
2nd place, silver medalist(s)	Mojtaba Goleij (IRI)
3rd place, bronze medalist(s)	Habila Awusayiman (CHN)
3rd place, bronze medalist(s)	Ganbaataryn Gankhuyag (MGL)
5	Seo Ju-hwan (KOR)
5	Alisher Yergali (KAZ)
7	Kanybek Abdulkhairov (KGZ)
8	Takashi Ishiguro (JPN)
9	Şatlyk Hemelýäýew (TKM)
10	Magomed Ibragimov (UZB)
11	Mo Sari (CAM)
12	Rahmonjon Mahmadbekov (TJK)
13	Sardar Wali Naderi (AFG)
14	Vicky Hooda (IND)
—	Ngô Văn Lâm (VIE)
