= Givi Matcharashvili =

Georgian freestyle wrestler (born 1997)

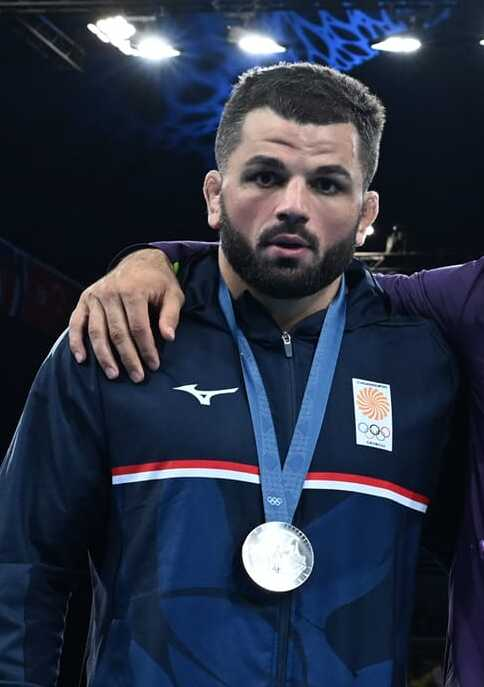
- Matcharashvili in 2024

Personal information
- Born: 17 May 1997 (age 29) Mtskheta, Georgia
- Height: 1.82 m (6 ft 0 in)
- Weight: 97 kg (214 lb)

Sport
- Country: Georgia
- Sport: Amateur wrestling
- Weight class: 97 kg
- Event: Freestyle
Medal record
Men's freestyle wrestling
Representing Georgia
Olympic Games
Silver medal – second place	2024 Paris	97 kg
World Championships
Bronze medal – third place	2022 Belgrade	97 kg
Bronze medal – third place	2023 Belgrade	97 kg
European Championships
Gold medal – first place	2023 Zagreb	97 kg
Gold medal – first place	2024 Bucharest	97 kg
Gold medal – first place	2025 Bratislava	97 kg
European Games
Silver medal – second place	2019 Minsk	125 kg
Yasar Dogu Tournament
Silver medal – second place	2020 Istanbul	97 kg
Bronze medal – third place	2021 Istanbul	97 kg
Grand Prix
Bronze medal – third place	2023 Budapest	97 kg
Bronze medal – third place	2024 Budapest	125 kg
World U23 Championships
Gold medal – first place	2018 Bucharest	97 kg
European U23 Championship
Gold medal – first place	2017 Szombathely	97 kg
Bronze medal – third place	2016 Ruse	97 kg
Bronze medal – third place	2018 Istanbul	97 kg
Bronze medal – third place	2019 Novi Sad	97 kg

Givi Matcharashvili (born 17 May 1997) is a Georgian freestyle wrestler. He won the silver medal in the men's 97 kg event at the 2024 Summer Olympics in Paris, France. He won one of the bronze medals at the 2022 World Wrestling Championships in Belgrade. Matcharashvili represented Georgia at the 2019 European Games in Minsk, Belarus and he won the silver medal in the 125 kg event.

In 2022, Matcharashvili won the silver medal in his event at the Matteo Pellicone Ranking Series held in Rome, Italy.

Matcharashvili debuted for Real American Freestyle at RAF 06 on 28 February 2026, where he defeated Stephen Buchanan by criteria. This fight earned him a Match of the Night award. He lost to Kyle Snyder in a RAF Light Heavyweight Championship bout at RAF 09 on 30 May 2026. Matcharashvili faced Zachery Elam at RAF Georgia on 11 July 2026 and won by decision.

== Achievements ==
Year	Tournament	Location	Result	Event
2019	European Games	Minsk, Belarus	2nd	Freestyle 125 kg
2022	World Championships	Belgrade, Serbia	3rd	Freestyle 97 kg
2023	European Championships	Zagreb, Croatia	1st	Freestyle 97 kg
2023	World Championships	Belgrade, Serbia	3rd	Freestyle 97 kg
2024	European Championships	Bucharest, Romania	1st	Freestyle 97 kg
2024	Summer Olympics	Paris, France	2nd	Freestyle 97 kg
2025	European Championships	Bratislava, Slovakia	1st	Freestyle 97 kg
