= Ganbaataryn Gankhuyag =

Mongol amateur wrestler (born 1996)

Personal information
- Native name: Ганбаатарын Ганхуяг
- Nationality: Mongolia
- Born: 16 March 1996 (age 30) Bulgan, Khovd Province, Mongolia
- Height: 170 cm (5 ft 7 in)

Sport
- Country: Mongolia
- Sport: Amateur wrestling
- Weight class: 97 kg
- Event: Freestyle

Achievements and titles
- Regional finals: (bronze) (2023)
Medal record
Representing Mongolia
Men's freestyle wrestling
Asian Games
Bronze medal – third place	2022 Hangzhou	97 kg
Asian Championships
Bronze medal – third place	2019 Xi'an	86 kg
Bronze medal – third place	2023 Astana	92 kg
World Military Championships
Bronze medal – third place	2024 Yerevan	97 kg
Ranking Series
Silver medal – second place	2023 Bishkek	92 kg
Silver medal – second place	2025 Ulaanbaatar	97 kg
Bronze medal – third place	2023 Zagreb	92 kg
World U23 Championships
Bronze medal – third place	2018 Bucharest	86 kg
Asian U23 Championships
Bronze medal – third place	2019 Ulaanbaatar	86 kg
Men's Greco-Roman wrestling
Asian Games
Bronze medal – third place	2026 Aichi–Nagoya	97 kg
Grand Prix
Bronze medal – third place	2025 Ulaanbaatar	97 kg
Bronze medal – third place	2026 Ulaanbaatar	97 kg

Ganbaataryn Gankhuyag (Mongolian: Ганбаатарын Ганхуяг, born 16 March 1996) is a Mongolian freestyle wrestler. He won the bronze medal in the men's freestyle 97 kg event at the 2022 Asian Games held in Hangzhou, China.

== Career ==
Gankhuyag placed eighth at the 2024 World Wrestling Championships. He has won two bronze medals at the Asian Wrestling Championships: in 2019 (86 kg), 2023 (92 kg). Gankhuyag also won bronze medal in 2022 at the Asian Games (97 kg), with wins over the Alexander Medved Prizes International champion and Olympic medalist Magomed Ibragimov (technical fall), Alisher Yergali (8–1) in the repechage rounds.

He also won bronze medals at the 2024 World Military Wrestling Championships in Yerevan and at both the 2018 U23 World Wrestling Championships in Bucharest and 2019 Asian U23 Wrestling Championships in Ulaanbaatar.
