= Mojtaba Goleij =

Iranian freestyle wrestler

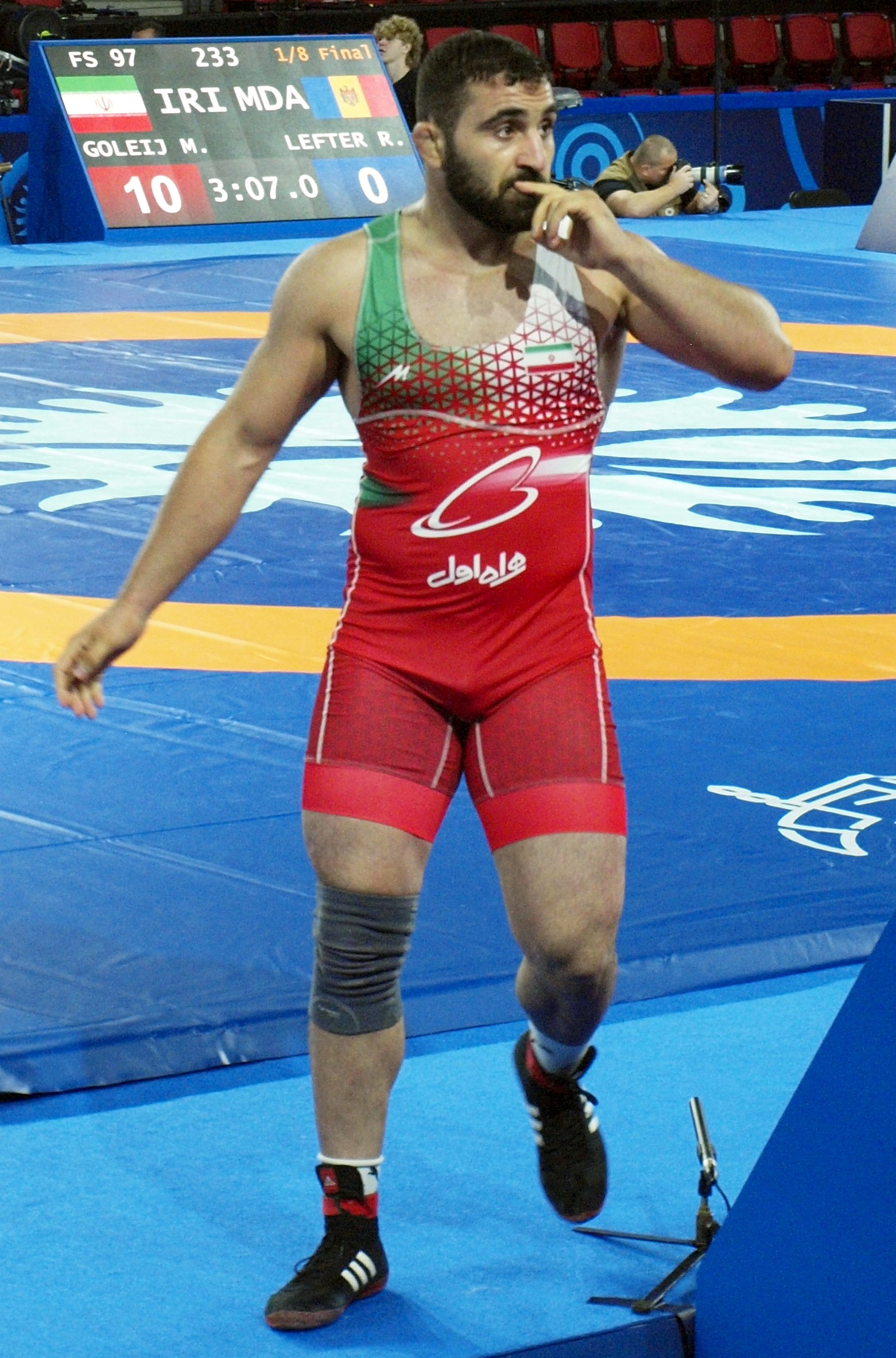
- Mojtaba Goleij at the 2021 World Wrestling Championships in Oslo, Norway

Personal information
- Full name: Mojtaba Mohammadshafie Goleij
- Born: 23 January 1996 (age 30) Tonekabon, Mazandaran, Iran
- Home town: Tonekabon
- Education: Ayandegan Institute of Higher Education
- Height: 183 cm (6 ft 0 in)
- Weight: 97 kg (214 lb)

Sport
- Country: Iran
- Sport: wrestling
- Weight class: 97 kg
- Event: Freestyle
- Coached by: Pejman Dorostkar (national)
Medal record
Men's freestyle wrestling
Representing Iran
World Championships
Bronze medal – third place	2021 Oslo	97 kg
Asian Games
Silver medal – second place	2022 Hangzhou	97 kg
Asian Championships
Gold medal – first place	2020 New Delhi	97 kg
Silver medal – second place	2018 Bishkek	97 kg
Bronze medal – third place	2023 Astana	97 kg
Islamic Solidarity Games
Gold medal – first place	2021 Konya	97 kg
Asian Indoor and Martial Arts Games
Gold medal – first place	2017 Ashgabat	97 kg
World U23 Championships
Gold medal – first place	2017 Bydgoszcz	97 kg
Gold medal – first place	2019 Budapest	97 kg

Mojtaba Goleij (Persian: مجتبی گلیج, born 23 January 1996) is an Iranian freestyle wrestler. He won one of the bronze medals in the men's 97 kg event at the 2021 World Wrestling Championships held in Oslo, Norway. He is also a three-time medalist, including one gold, at the Asian Wrestling Championships.

== Career ==
In 2017, he won the gold medal in the men's 97 kg event at the Asian Indoor and Martial Arts Games held in Ashgabat, Turkmenistan.

He won the gold medal in the men's 97 kg event at the 2020 Asian Wrestling Championships held in New Delhi, India. Two years earlier, he won the silver medal in this event at the 2018 Asian Wrestling Championships held in Bishkek, Kyrgyzstan.

He won the gold medal in his event at the 2021 Islamic Solidarity Games held in Konya, Turkey.

== Achievements ==
Year	Tournament	Location	Result	Event
2017	Asian Indoor and Martial Arts Games	Ashgabat, Turkmenistan	1st	Freestyle 97 kg
2018	Asian Championships	Bishkek, Kyrgyzstan	2nd	Freestyle 97 kg
2020	Asian Championships	New Delhi, India	1st	Freestyle 97 kg
2021	World Championships	Oslo, Norway	3rd	Freestyle 97 kg
2022	Islamic Solidarity Games	Konya, Turkey	1st	Freestyle 97 kg
2023	Asian Championships	Astana, Kazakhstan	3rd	Freestyle 97 kg
