= Habila Awusayiman =

Chinese freestyle wrestler

Personal information
- Native name: 哈比拉·阿吾萨衣滿; Әбусайман Хабила
- Born: 1 June 1998 (age 28) Emin County, Xinjiang, China
- Education: Xinjiang Normal University
- Height: 184 cm (6 ft 0 in)
- Weight: 97 kg (214 lb)

Sport
- Country: China
- Sport: Amateur wrestling
- Weight class: 97 kg
- Event: Freestyle
Medal record
Men's freestyle wrestling
Representing China
Asian Games
Bronze medal – third place	2022 Hangzhou	97 kg
Asian Championships
Silver medal – second place	2023 Astana	97 kg
Bronze medal – third place	2025 Amman	97 kg
Grand Prix
Silver medal – second place	2023 Bishkek	97 kg
Bronze medal – third place	2023 Zagreb	97 kg
National Games of China
Silver medal – second place	2021 Shaanxi	97 kg

Habila Awusayiman (Әбусайман Хабила, born 1 June 1998) is a Chinese Freestyle wrestler. He won a silver medal in the 97 kg event at the 2023 Asian Wrestling Championships held in Astana, Kazakhstan.

== Background ==
Awusayiman was born in 1998 in Emin County, Xinjiang, China. He is of Kazakh ethnicity.

Awusayiman started participating in freestyle wrestling when he was 13 at a sports school.

== Career ==
In September 2021, Awusayiman participated in the Freestyle wrestling 97 kg event of the 2021 National Games of China where he represented Xinjiang province. He reached the final where he obtained a silver medal after losing to Yang Chaoqiang of Shandong province in the final.

In February 2023, Awusayiman participated in the 2023 Grand Prix Zagreb Open where he obtained a bronze medal after defeating Nishan Randhawa of Canada in the bronze medal bout.

In April 2023, Awusayiman participated in the 2023 Asian Wrestling Championships where he obtained a silver medal after losing to Akhmed Tazhudinov of Bahrain in the final.

In June 2023, Awusayiman participated in the 2023 Kaba Uulu Kozhomkul & Raatbek Sanatbaev Tournament where he obtained a silver medal after once again losing to Tazhudinov in the final.

In May 2024, Awusayiman competed at the 2024 World Wrestling Olympic Qualification Tournament and won the wrestle-off against Magomed Ibragimov to qualify for the 2024 Summer Olympics. He competed in the men's freestyle 97 kg event at the Olympics where he was eliminated by Kyle Snyder in the Round of 16.
