= Rizabek Aitmukhan =

Kazakh freestyle wrestler (born 2004)

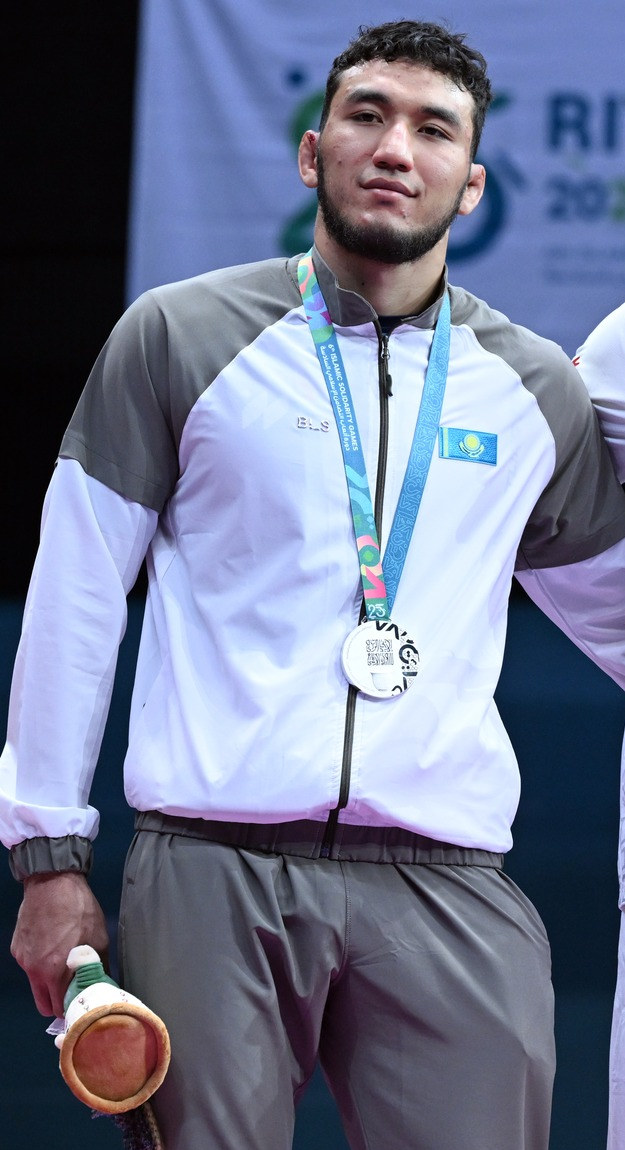
- Aitmukhan in 2025

Personal information
- Native name: Ризабек Айтмұқан
- Born: 29 April 2004 (age 22) Kishkenekol, Kazakhstan
- Height: 1.91 m (6 ft 3 in)
- Weight: 97 kg (214 lb; 15.3 st)

Sport
- Country: Kazakhstan
- Sport: Amateur wrestling
- Event: Freestyle
Medal record
Men's freestyle wrestling
Representing Kazakhstan
World Championships
Gold medal – first place	2023 Belgrade	92 kg
Asian Championships
Silver medal – second place	2023 Astana	92 kg
Silver medal – second place	2024 Bishkek	97 kg
Silver medal – second place	2025 Amman	97 kg
Islamic Solidarity Games
Silver medal – second place	2025 Riyadh	97 kg
World U23 Championships
Gold medal – first place	2024 Tirana	97 kg
Bronze medal – third place	2025 Novi Sad	97 kg
World Juniors Championships
Gold medal – first place	2024 Pontevedra	97 kg
Silver medal – second place	2023 Amman	92 kg
Grand Prix
Silver medal – second place	2022 Taraz	92 kg
Bronze medal – third place	2023 Budapest	92 kg
Bronze medal – third place	2024 Budapest	97 kg
Bronze medal – third place	2026 Tirana	97 kg
Yasar Dogu Tournament
Gold medal – first place	2025 Kocaeli	97 kg
Bronze medal – third place	2024 Antalya	97 kg
Asian U23 Championships
Gold medal – first place	2022 Bishkek	92 kg
Gold medal – first place	2023 Bishkek	92 kg

Rizabek Qanatūly Aitmūqan (Note: Often transliterated as Rizabek Kanatovich Aitmukhan through a Russified Romanization of Ризабек Канатович Айтмухан.) (Kazakh: Ризабек Қанатұлы Айтмұқан; born 29 April 2004) is a Kazakh freestyle wrestler. He won the gold medal in the 92 kg event at the 2023 World Wrestling Championships.

== Career ==
On February 7, 2023, at the age of 18, Aitmukhan became the champion of Kazakhstan in freestyle wrestling among seniors.

On September 18, 2023, he won the first gold medal in the history of Kazakhstan at the World Freestyle Wrestling Championships. Aitmukhan defeated the Hungarian wrestler in the first round with a score of 13:3, and in the second round defeated the European champion of 2023, Turkish Feyzullah Aktürk with a score of 11:0. And in the semifinals, the Kazakh wrestler defeated his Georgian opponent and for the first time in his career reached the final of the World Championship among adults. In the final, Aitmukhan fought with Azerbaijani Osman Nurmogamedov and became the winner.

On April 18, 2026, Aitmukhan challenged Kyle Snyder for the RAF Light Heavyweight Championship at RAF 08, losing by decision. This fight earned him a Match of the Night award.
