= 2026 Asian Wrestling Championships – Results =

These are the results of the 2026 Asian Wrestling Championships which took place between 6 and 12 April 2026 in Bishkek, Kyrgyzstan.

== Men's freestyle ==
=== 57 kg ===
10–11 April

Round of 16
Kim Sung-gwon (KOR)	13
Pei Jiatao (CHN)	0
Merey Bazarbayev (KAZ)	9
Nodirbek Jumanazarov (UZB)	3
Ankush Chandram (IND)	10
Gayan Ekanayake (SRI)	0

Quarterfinals
Batkhuyagiin Mönkh-Erdene (MGL)	7
Kim Sung-gwon (KOR)	0
Aiaal Belolyubskii (TJK)	4
Abdymalik Karachov (KGZ)	8
Fuga Sasaki (JPN)	2
Merey Bazarbayev (KAZ)	1
Ankush Chandram (IND)	0
Milad Valizadeh (IRI)	10

Semifinals
Batkhuyagiin Mönkh-Erdene (MGL)	4
Abdymalik Karachov (KGZ)	1
Fuga Sasaki (JPN)	0
Milad Valizadeh (IRI)	11

Final
Batkhuyagiin Mönkh-Erdene (MGL)	3
Milad Valizadeh (IRI)	14

Bronze medals
Kim Sung-gwon (KOR)
Abdymalik Karachov (KGZ)	WO
Ankush Chandram (IND)	8
Fuga Sasaki (JPN)	2

=== 61 kg ===
11–12 April

Round of 16
Toshihiro Hasegawa (JPN)	6
Assyl Aitakyn (KAZ)	2
Gulomjon Abdullaev (UZB)	4
Zou Wanhao (CHN)	1
Gankhülegiin Batnasan (MGL)	0
Kim Kwang-myong (PRK)	10

Quarterfinals
Ahmad Javan (IRI)	8
Toshihiro Hasegawa (JPN)	5
Kim Chang-su (KOR)	0
Aman Sehrawat (IND)	11
Bekzat Almaz Uulu (KGZ)	3
Gulomjon Abdullaev (UZB)	4
Kim Kwang-myong (PRK)	11
Azatberdi Aşyrgulyýew (TKM)	0

Semifinals
Ahmad Javan (IRI)	9
Aman Sehrawat (IND)	11
Gulomjon Abdullaev (UZB)	0
Kim Kwang-myong (PRK)	3^{F}

Final
Aman Sehrawat (IND)	10
Kim Kwang-myong (PRK)	13

Repechage round 1
Gankhülegiin Batnasan (MGL)	0
Azatberdi Aşyrgulyýew (TKM)	5

Bronze medals
Kim Chang-su (KOR)	0
Ahmad Javan (IRI)	12
Azatberdi Aşyrgulyýew (TKM)	0
Gulomjon Abdullaev (UZB)	11

=== 65 kg ===
10–11 April

Round of 16
Rustamzhan Kakharov (KGZ)	6
Peyman Nemati (IRI)	4
Adi Serikuly (KAZ)	4
Takara Suda (JPN)	6
Ou Xuexian (CHN)	WO
Yun Jun-sik (KOR)
Charles Fernando (SRI)	0
Byambasürengiin Zeneemeder (MGL)	4^{F}

Quarterfinals
Sujeet Kalkal (IND)	10
Rustamzhan Kakharov (KGZ)	0
Takara Suda (JPN)	0
Abdulmazhid Kudiev (TJK)	9
Alibeg Alibegov (BRN)	4
Ou Xuexian (CHN)	4
Byambasürengiin Zeneemeder (MGL)	0
Umidjon Jalolov (UZB)	2^{F}

Semifinals
Sujeet Kalkal (IND)	7
Abdulmazhid Kudiev (TJK)	2
Alibeg Alibegov (BRN)	3
Umidjon Jalolov (UZB)	5

Final
Sujeet Kalkal (IND)	8
Umidjon Jalolov (UZB)	1

Bronze medals
Rustamzhan Kakharov (KGZ)	7
Abdulmazhid Kudiev (TJK)	10
Byambasürengiin Zeneemeder (MGL)	1
Alibeg Alibegov (BRN)	3

=== 70 kg ===
10–11 April

Round of 16
Taishi Narikuni (JPN)	7
Viktor Rassadin (TJK)	4
Yoo Seon-ho (KOR)	0
Shakhzodbek Yarashev (UZB)	8

Quarterfinals
Ernazar Akmataliev (KGZ)	12
Taishi Narikuni (JPN)	9
Wang Siming (CHN)	1
Abhimanyou Mandwal (IND)	11
Sina Khalili (IRI)	10
Sanzhar Doszhanov (KAZ)	3
Shakhzodbek Yarashev (UZB)	4
Tömör-Ochiryn Tulga (MGL)	8

Semifinals
Ernazar Akmataliev (KGZ)	3
Abhimanyou Mandwal (IND)	6
Sina Khalili (IRI)	1
Tömör-Ochiryn Tulga (MGL)	5

Final
Abhimanyou Mandwal (IND)	5
Tömör-Ochiryn Tulga (MGL)	3

Bronze medals
Wang Siming (CHN)	7
Ernazar Akmataliev (KGZ)	16
Shakhzodbek Yarashev (UZB)	0
Sina Khalili (IRI)	11

=== 74 kg ===
11–12 April

Round of 16
Suresh Chunara (NEP)	0
Mustafo Akhmedov (TJK)	10
Batuqinggele (CHN)	3
Begijon Kuldashev (UZB)	5
Watan Annaorazow (TKM)	1
Yernur Nurgazy (KAZ)	10
Yoshinosuke Aoyagi (JPN)	3
Zandanbudyn Sumiyaabazar (MGL)	0
Amir Mohammad Yazdani (IRI)	2^{F}
Anil Munasinghe (SRI)	0
Han Dae-gil (KOR)	0
Jaideep Narwal (IND)	9^{F}

Quarterfinals
Magomedrasul Asluev (BRN)	3
Mustafo Akhmedov (TJK)	1
Begijon Kuldashev (UZB)	5
Yernur Nurgazy (KAZ)	2
Yoshinosuke Aoyagi (JPN)	7
Amir Mohammad Yazdani (IRI)	6
Jaideep Narwal (IND)	0
Orozobek Toktomambetov (KGZ)	2

Semifinals
Magomedrasul Asluev (BRN)	4
Begijon Kuldashev (UZB)	3
Yoshinosuke Aoyagi (JPN)	10
Orozobek Toktomambetov (KGZ)	0

Final
Magomedrasul Asluev (BRN)	0
Yoshinosuke Aoyagi (JPN)	2

Repechage round 1
Zandanbudyn Sumiyaabazar (MGL)	1
Amir Mohammad Yazdani (IRI)	11

Bronze medals
Mustafo Akhmedov (TJK)	7
Begijon Kuldashev (UZB)	6
Amir Mohammad Yazdani (IRI)	9
Orozobek Toktomambetov (KGZ)	3

=== 79 kg ===
10–11 April

Round of 16
Keyvan Gharehdaghi (JPN)	9
Daulet Yergesh (KAZ)	1
Lu Feng (CHN)	5
Mehdi Yousefi (IRI)	6
Zhakshylyk Baitashov (KGZ)	0
Sandeep Singh Mann (IND)	7
Lee Sung-ho (KOR)	1
Somonjon Ikromov (TJK)	6

Quarterfinals
Olonbayaryn Süldkhüü (MGL)	9
Keyvan Gharehdaghi (JPN)	14
Mehdi Yousefi (IRI)	2
Razambek Zhamalov (UZB)	5
Erzo Isakov (JOR)	5
Sandeep Singh Mann (IND)	6
Somonjon Ikromov (TJK)	6
Soltan Sanjar Begenjow (TKM)	1

Semifinals
Keyvan Gharehdaghi (JPN)	4
Razambek Zhamalov (UZB)	3
Sandeep Singh Mann (IND)	10
Somonjon Ikromov (TJK)	0

Final
Keyvan Gharehdaghi (JPN)	2
Sandeep Singh Mann (IND)	1

Repechage round 1
Daulet Yergesh (KAZ)	2
Olonbayaryn Süldkhüü (MGL)	15
Zhakshylyk Baitashov (KGZ)	6
Erzo Isakov (JOR)	2

Bronze medals
Olonbayaryn Süldkhüü (MGL)	WO
~~Razambek Zhamalov (UZB)~~
Zhakshylyk Baitashov (KGZ)	6
Somonjon Ikromov (TJK)	0

=== 86 kg ===
11–12 April

Round of 16
Yudai Takahashi (JPN)	10
Gary Chow (SGP)	0
Bakhodur Kadirov (TJK)	5
Gangsuhe (CHN)	4
Bat-Erdeniin Byambadorj (MGL)	0
Alp Arslan Begenjow (TKM)	10
Bolat Sakayev (KAZ)	11
Lee Gyeong-yeon (KOR)	0
Lakmal Wijesooriya (SRI)	0
Ji Song-gang (PRK)	10
Khidir Saipudinov (BRN)	3
Malik Shavaev (KGZ)	1
Bobur Islomov (UZB)	0
Mukul Dahiya (IND)	2

Quarterfinals
Kamran Ghasempour (IRI)	12
Yudai Takahashi (JPN)	2
Bakhodur Kadirov (TJK)	0
Alp Arslan Begenjow (TKM)	10
Bolat Sakayev (KAZ)	12
Ji Song-gang (PRK)	2
Khidir Saipudinov (BRN)	0
Mukul Dahiya (IND)	9

Semifinals
Kamran Ghasempour (IRI)	11
Alp Arslan Begenjow (TKM)	0
Bolat Sakayev (KAZ)	6
Mukul Dahiya (IND)	12

Final
Kamran Ghasempour (IRI)	7^{F}
Mukul Dahiya (IND)	0

Repechage round 1
Bobur Islomov (UZB)	1
Khidir Saipudinov (BRN)	4

Bronze medals
Yudai Takahashi (JPN)	5
Alp Arslan Begenjow (TKM)	10^{F}
Khidir Saipudinov (BRN)	2
Bolat Sakayev (KAZ)	1

=== 92 kg ===
11–12 April

Round of 16
Cha Seo-hyun (KOR)	0
Ayidusi Hade (CHN)	10
Ismail Kartoev (TJK)	5
Döwletgeldi Myradow (TKM)	0
Punit Kumar (IND)	2
Takashi Ishiguro (JPN)	12
Byambasürengiin Bat-Erdene (MGL)	4
Sadirdin Daminjonov (UZB)	0

Quarterfinals
Magomed Sharipov (BRN)	5
Ayidusi Hade (CHN)	2
Ismail Kartoev (TJK)	2
Iakov Chaplin (KGZ)	2
Mohammad Mobin Azimi (IRI)	9
Takashi Ishiguro (JPN)	0
Byambasürengiin Bat-Erdene (MGL)	0
Azamat Dauletbekov (KAZ)	3

Semifinals
Magomed Sharipov (BRN)	8
Iakov Chaplin (KGZ)	0
Mohammad Mobin Azimi (IRI)	6
Azamat Dauletbekov (KAZ)	0

Final
Magomed Sharipov (BRN)	0
Mohammad Mobin Azimi (IRI)	11

Bronze medals
Ayidusi Hade (CHN)	4
Iakov Chaplin (KGZ)	6
Takashi Ishiguro (JPN)	0
Azamat Dauletbekov (KAZ)	6

=== 97 kg ===
10–11 April

Round of 16
Sherzod Poyonov (UZB)	8
Kanybek Abdulkhairov (KGZ)	2
Rahmonjon Mahmadbekov (TJK)	0
Şatlyk Hemelýäýew (TKM)	10
Triloki Yadav (NEP)	0
Vicky Hooda (IND)	10
Ganbaataryn Gankhuyag (MGL)	3
Seo Ju-hwan (KOR)	0
Bekzat Urkimbay (KAZ)	WO
Habila Awusayiman (CHN)

Quarterfinals
Amir Ali Azarpira (IRI)	10
Sherzod Poyonov (UZB)	0
Şatlyk Hemelýäýew (TKM)	0
Vicky Hooda (IND)	10
Akhmed Tazhudinov (BRN)	6
Ganbaataryn Gankhuyag (MGL)	2
Bekzat Urkimbay (KAZ)	0
Arash Yoshida (JPN)	10

Semifinals
Amir Ali Azarpira (IRI)	2
Vicky Hooda (IND)	0
Akhmed Tazhudinov (BRN)	6
Arash Yoshida (JPN)	15

Final
Amir Ali Azarpira (IRI)	0
Arash Yoshida (JPN)	4

Bronze medals
Sherzod Poyonov (UZB)	7
Vicky Hooda (IND)	5
Bekzat Urkimbay (KAZ)	0
Akhmed Tazhudinov (BRN)	14

=== 125 kg ===
11–12 April

Round of 16
Batbayaryn Nambardagva (MGL)	2
Yedige Kassimbek (KAZ)	2
Taiki Yamamoto (JPN)	0
Dinesh Dhankhar (IND)	11
Arslanbek Turdubekov (KGZ)	5
Zyýamuhammet Saparow (TKM)	0

Quarterfinals
Amir Hossein Zare (IRI)	7
Yedige Kassimbek (KAZ)	0
Kim Gwan-uk (KOR)	4
Buheeerdun (CHN)	9
Khasanboy Rakhimov (UZB)	0
Dinesh Dhankhar (IND)	10
Arslanbek Turdubekov (KGZ)	0
Shamil Sharipov (BRN)	7

Semifinals
Amir Hossein Zare (IRI)	5
Buheeerdun (CHN)	0
Dinesh Dhankhar (IND)	0
Shamil Sharipov (BRN)	2^{F}

Final
Amir Hossein Zare (IRI)	4
Shamil Sharipov (BRN)	0

Bronze medals
Yedige Kassimbek (KAZ)	8
Buheeerdun (CHN)	7
Arslanbek Turdubekov (KGZ)	1
Dinesh Dhankhar (IND)	12

== Men's Greco-Roman ==
=== 55 kg ===
6–7 April

Round of 16
Kim Jong-hyeon (KOR)	4
Rasul Joraýew (TKM)	13
Mohammad Hosseinvand (IRI)	4
Nurzat Kabdyrakhimov (KAZ)	0
Mönkh-Erdeniin Davaabandi (MGL)	1
Ahmad Khaled (JOR)	6

Quarterfinals
Shi Huoying (CHN)	10
Rasul Joraýew (TKM)	0
Mizuki Araki (JPN)	8
Lalit Sehrawat (IND)	9
Ikhtiyor Botirov (UZB)	10
Mohammad Hosseinvand (IRI)	0
Ahmad Khaled (JOR)	1
Ulan Muratbek Uulu (KGZ)	2

Semifinals
Shi Huoying (CHN)	3
Lalit Sehrawat (IND)	11
Ikhtiyor Botirov (UZB)	5
Ulan Muratbek Uulu (KGZ)	3

Final
Lalit Sehrawat (IND)	0
Ikhtiyor Botirov (UZB)	9

Bronze medals
Mizuki Araki (JPN)	0
Shi Huoying (CHN)	9
Mohammad Hosseinvand (IRI)	7
Ulan Muratbek Uulu (KGZ)	1

=== 60 kg ===
7–8 April

Round of 16
Tan Haodong (CHN)	7
Kurmanbek Zhaparov (KGZ)	5
Kim Min-woo (KOR)	1
Ali Ahmadi Vafa (IRI)	12^{F}

Quarterfinals
Alisher Ganiev (UZB)	10
Tan Haodong (CHN)	0
Sahil Kadyan (IND)	2
Yu Shiotani (JPN)	6
Yerbol Kamaliyev (KAZ)	8^{F}
Su Yong-xiang (TPE)	0
Ali Ahmadi Vafa (IRI)	2
Ri Se-ung (PRK)	6

Semifinals
Alisher Ganiev (UZB)	10
Yu Shiotani (JPN)	0
Yerbol Kamaliyev (KAZ)	0
Ri Se-ung (PRK)	8

Final
Alisher Ganiev (UZB)	6^{F}
Ri Se-ung (PRK)	1

Bronze medals
Tan Haodong (CHN)	1
Yu Shiotani (JPN)	5
Ali Ahmadi Vafa (IRI)	10
Yerbol Kamaliyev (KAZ)	0

=== 63 kg ===
6–7 April

Round of 16
Saifulla Kurman (KAZ)	6
Sunny Kumar (IND)	2
Wu Huangsheng (CHN)	10
Choi Hyun-woong (KOR)	13
Islomjon Bakhromov (UZB)	8
Rayan Hawsawi (KSA)	0

Quarterfinals
Azatjan Açilow (TKM)	1
Saifulla Kurman (KAZ)	1
Kaisei Tanabe (JPN)	3
Aftandil Taalaibek Uulu (KGZ)	4
Erfan Jarkani (IRI)	7
Choi Hyun-woong (KOR)	1
Islomjon Bakhromov (UZB)	4
Aref Mohammadi (QAT)	3

Semifinals
Azatjan Açilow (TKM)	0
Aftandil Taalaibek Uulu (KGZ)	10
Erfan Jarkani (IRI)	5
Islomjon Bakhromov (UZB)	3

Final
Aftandil Taalaibek Uulu (KGZ)	7
Erfan Jarkani (IRI)	2

Bronze medals
Kaisei Tanabe (JPN)	9
Azatjan Açilow (TKM)	0
Choi Hyun-woong (KOR)	9^{F}
Islomjon Bakhromov (UZB)	6

=== 67 kg ===
7–8 April

Round of 16
Bagdat Sabaz (KAZ)	4
Chung Han-jae (KOR)	7
Abdumalik Aminov (UZB)	8
Son Man-gwang (PRK)	3
Leng Ji (CHN)	3
Kensuke Shimizu (JPN)	4

Quarterfinals
Razzak Beishekeev (KGZ)	5
Chung Han-jae (KOR)	1^{R}
Sunat Abdulloev (TJK)	0
Ahmad Reza Mohsennejad (IRI)	10
Munthir Jandu (KSA)	0
Abdumalik Aminov (UZB)	9
Kensuke Shimizu (JPN)	5^{F}
Sachin Sahrawat (IND)	0

Semifinals
Razzak Beishekeev (KGZ)	9
Ahmad Reza Mohsennejad (IRI)	0
Abdumalik Aminov (UZB)	2
Kensuke Shimizu (JPN)	5

Final
Razzak Beishekeev (KGZ)	8
Kensuke Shimizu (JPN)	2

Repechage round 1
Leng Ji (CHN)	4
Sachin Sahrawat (IND)	9

Bronze medals
Chung Han-jae (KOR)
Ahmad Reza Mohsennejad (IRI)	WO
Sachin Sahrawat (IND)	6
Abdumalik Aminov (UZB)	5

=== 72 kg ===
7–8 April

Round of 16
Didar Orazberdiýew (TKM)	0
Li Dongyu (CHN)	9
Loiqi Amirkhonzoda (TJK)	2
Taishi Narikuni (JPN)	11

Quarterfinals
Almatbek Amanbek (KAZ)	3
Li Dongyu (CHN)	1
Anil Dahiya (IND)	0
Amantur Ismailov (KGZ)	8
Shakhzod Kuchkorov (UZB)	11
Lim Do-hun (KOR)	0
Taishi Narikuni (JPN)	0
Mohammad Javad Rezaei (IRI)	9

Semifinals
Almatbek Amanbek (KAZ)	3
Amantur Ismailov (KGZ)	1
Shakhzod Kuchkorov (UZB)	0
Mohammad Javad Rezaei (IRI)	9

Final
Almatbek Amanbek (KAZ)	2^{F}
Mohammad Javad Rezaei (IRI)	1

Bronze medals
Li Dongyu (CHN)	9^{F}
Amantur Ismailov (KGZ)	0
Taishi Narikuni (JPN)	0
Shakhzod Kuchkorov (UZB)	9

=== 77 kg ===
6–7 April

Round of 16
Tameem Al-Shammari (QAT)	0
Noh Yeong-hun (KOR)	8
Alisher Ruzimadov (TJK)	6
Bahejiang Halishan (CHN)	9
Yao Lai-hsing (TPE)	5
Amro Sadeh (JOR)	5
Akzhol Makhmudov (KGZ)	7
Isami Horikita (JPN)	3

Quarterfinals
Ali Oskoo (IRI)	5
Noh Yeong-hun (KOR)	2
Bahejiang Halishan (CHN)	4
Aman Baroniya (IND)	6
Doniyorkhon Nakibov (UZB)	9
Amro Sadeh (JOR)	0
Akzhol Makhmudov (KGZ)	9
Kaharman Kissymetov (KAZ)	1

Semifinals
Ali Oskoo (IRI)	13
Aman Baroniya (IND)	3
Doniyorkhon Nakibov (UZB)	0
Akzhol Makhmudov (KGZ)	9

Final
Ali Oskoo (IRI)	3
Akzhol Makhmudov (KGZ)	3

Repechage round 1
Isami Horikita (JPN)	1
Kaharman Kissymetov (KAZ)	9

Bronze medals
Noh Yeong-hun (KOR)	15
Aman Baroniya (IND)	14
Kaharman Kissymetov (KAZ)	1
Doniyorkhon Nakibov (UZB)	10

=== 82 kg ===
7–8 April

Round of 16
Yryskeldi Maksatbek Uulu (KGZ)	3
Liu Rui (CHN)	4
Tatsuya Fujii (JPN)	5
Lee Ba-da (KOR)	3

Quarterfinals
Shahin Badaghi (QAT)	5
Liu Rui (CHN)	3
Aram Vardanyan (UZB)	1
Ibragim Magomadov (KAZ)	3
Mohammad Amin Hosseini (IRI)	9
Didar Amannazarow (TKM)	0
Tatsuya Fujii (JPN)	2
Prince (IND)	4

Semifinals
Shahin Badaghi (QAT)	9
Ibragim Magomadov (KAZ)	8
Mohammad Amin Hosseini (IRI)	10
Prince (IND)	0

Final
Shahin Badaghi (QAT)	4
Mohammad Amin Hosseini (IRI)	3

Bronze medals
Liu Rui (CHN)	3
Ibragim Magomadov (KAZ)	5
Didar Amannazarow (TKM)	1
Prince (IND)	10

=== 87 kg ===
6–7 April

Round of 16
Yahiro Motohashi (JPN)	7
Döwletmyrat Baýramow (TKM)	7
Zheng Shichang (CHN)	WO
~~Jafar Khan (QAT)~~
Gholamreza Farrokhi (IRI)	9
Muhammad Sultonzoda (TJK)	0

Quarterfinals
Asan Zhanyshov (KGZ)	10^{F}
Döwletmyrat Baýramow (TKM)	0
Lee Seung-hwan (KOR)	1
Nursultan Tursynov (KAZ)	7
Sunil Kumar (IND)	5
Zheng Shichang (CHN)	1
Gholamreza Farrokhi (IRI)	9
Mukhammadkodir Rasulov (UZB)	0

Semifinals
Asan Zhanyshov (KGZ)	8
Nursultan Tursynov (KAZ)	0
Sunil Kumar (IND)	0
Gholamreza Farrokhi (IRI)	8

Final
Asan Zhanyshov (KGZ)	11
Gholamreza Farrokhi (IRI)	4

Repechage round 1
Muhammad Sultonzoda (TJK)	0
Mukhammadkodir Rasulov (UZB)	9

Bronze medals
Döwletmyrat Baýramow (TKM)	0
Nursultan Tursynov (KAZ)	9
Mukhammadkodir Rasulov (UZB)	4
Sunil Kumar (IND)	5

=== 97 kg ===
7–8 April

Round of 16
Lee Min-ho (KOR)	11
Amanberdi Agamämmedow (TKM)	0
Abdikodir Jalilov (UZB)	1
Melis Aitbekov (KGZ)	2
Ibrahim Fallatah (KSA)	7
Ganbaataryn Gankhuyag (MGL)	13

Quarterfinals
Mohammad Hadi Saravi (IRI)	8
Lee Min-ho (KOR)	0
Yuri Nakazato (JPN)	0
Islam Yevloyev (KAZ)	8
Nitesh Siwach (IND)	8
Melis Aitbekov (KGZ)	0
Ganbaataryn Gankhuyag (MGL)	0
Wang Zegang (CHN)	8

Semifinals
Mohammad Hadi Saravi (IRI)	3
Islam Yevloyev (KAZ)	1
Nitesh Siwach (IND)	7
Wang Zegang (CHN)	2

Final
Mohammad Hadi Saravi (IRI)	7
Nitesh Siwach (IND)	1

Bronze medals
Lee Min-ho (KOR)	0
Islam Yevloyev (KAZ)	9
Melis Aitbekov (KGZ)	1
Wang Zegang (CHN)	11

=== 130 kg ===
6–7 April

Round of 16
Batbayaryn Nambardagva (MGL)	0
Roman Kim (KGZ)	9
Ömer Amiroğlu (KSA)	0
Rafael Tsitsuashvili (UZB)	9

Quarterfinals
Amin Mirzazadeh (IRI)	9
Roman Kim (KGZ)	0
Kim Min-seok (KOR)	9
Joginder Rathee (IND)	0
Jokhar Uzarov (KAZ)	3
Yuta Nara (JPN)	3
Rafael Tsitsuashvili (UZB)	6
Jiang Wenhao (CHN)	2

Semifinals
Amin Mirzazadeh (IRI)	8
Kim Min-seok (KOR)	0
Yuta Nara (JPN)	2
Rafael Tsitsuashvili (UZB)	7

Final
Amin Mirzazadeh (IRI)	9
Rafael Tsitsuashvili (UZB)	0

Repechage round 1
Ömer Amiroğlu (KSA)	0
Jiang Wenhao (CHN)	9

Bronze medals
Roman Kim (KGZ)	0
Kim Min-seok (KOR)	4
Jiang Wenhao (CHN)	9
Yuta Nara (JPN)	2

== Women's freestyle ==
=== 50 kg ===
8–9 April

Round of 16
Nipuni Wasana (SRI)	0
Kim Son-hyang (PRK)	10
Lin Yi-hui (TPE)	5
Đỗ Ngọc Linh (VIE)	4
Yui Susaki (JPN)	2^{F}
Feng Ziqi (CHN)	0

Quarterfinals
Byambasürengiin Mönkhnar (MGL)	0
Kim Son-hyang (PRK)	10
Cheon Mi-ran (KOR)	0
Aktenge Keunimjaeva (UZB)	5^{F}
Maral Tangirbergenova (KAZ)	9
Lin Yi-hui (TPE)	2
Yui Susaki (JPN)	11
Neelam Sirohi (IND)	0

Semifinals
Kim Son-hyang (PRK)	12
Aktenge Keunimjaeva (UZB)	8
Maral Tangirbergenova (KAZ)	0
Yui Susaki (JPN)	8^{F}

Final
Kim Son-hyang (PRK)	0
Yui Susaki (JPN)	6

Repechage round 1
Nipuni Wasana (SRI)	4
Byambasürengiin Mönkhnar (MGL)	2
Feng Ziqi (CHN)	10
Neelam Sirohi (IND)	8

Bronze medals
Nipuni Wasana (SRI)	0
Aktenge Keunimjaeva (UZB)	3
Feng Ziqi (CHN)	10
Maral Tangirbergenova (KAZ)	0

=== 53 kg ===
9–10 April

Round of 16
Aziza Keldibekova (KGZ)	12
Pabasara Gamage (SRI)	1
Chen Ya-hsin (TPE)	0
Sakibjamal Esbosynova (UZB)	2^{F}
Gankhuyagiin Tsovoo (MGL)	1
Nguyễn Thị Mỹ Linh (VIE)	4

Quarterfinals
Zhang Jin (CHN)	10
Aziza Keldibekova (KGZ)	0
Moe Kiyooka (JPN)	10
Zeinep Bayanova (KAZ)	0
Meenakshi Goyat (IND)	15
Sakibjamal Esbosynova (UZB)	4
Nguyễn Thị Mỹ Linh (VIE)	3
Park Seo-young (KOR)	7

Semifinals
Zhang Jin (CHN)	2^{F}
Moe Kiyooka (JPN)	2
Meenakshi Goyat (IND)	4
Park Seo-young (KOR)	2

Final
Zhang Jin (CHN)	10
Meenakshi Goyat (IND)	0

Bronze medals
Aziza Keldibekova (KGZ)	0
Moe Kiyooka (JPN)	11
Sakibjamal Esbosynova (UZB)	4^{F}
Park Seo-young (KOR)	0

=== 55 kg ===
8–9 April

Quarterfinals		Semifinals		Final
Sowaka Uchida (JPN)	10
Oh Jeong-bin (KOR)	0	Sowaka Uchida (JPN)	10
Odonchimegiin Ariunzayaa (MGL)	12	Odonchimegiin Ariunzayaa (MGL)	0
Dilshoda Matnazarova (UZB)	1			Sowaka Uchida (JPN)	10
Li Yuxuan (CHN)	11			Li Yuxuan (CHN)	6
Aruuke Kadyrbek Kyzy (KGZ)	0	Li Yuxuan (CHN)	11
Hansika Lamba (IND)	7	Hansika Lamba (IND)	1
Shugyla Omirbek (KAZ)	0

Bronze medals
Oh Jeong-bin (KOR)
Odonchimegiin Ariunzayaa (MGL)	WO
Aruuke Kadyrbek Kyzy (KGZ)	1
Hansika Lamba (IND)	6

=== 57 kg ===
9–10 April

Round of 16
Nethmi Ahinsa (SRI)	0
Nguyễn Thị Mỹ Trang (VIE)	10
Batkhuyagiin Khulan (MGL)	10
Tancholpon Kybalbekova (KGZ)	0
Laylokhon Sobirova (UZB)	2
Sara Natami (JPN)	4^{F}

Quarterfinals
Hong Kexin (CHN)	10
Nguyễn Thị Mỹ Trang (VIE)	0
Liao Pei-ying (TPE)	4
Kwon Young-jin (KOR)	7^{F}
Manisha Bhanwala (IND)	2
Batkhuyagiin Khulan (MGL)	8
Sara Natami (JPN)	13
Nilufar Raimova (KAZ)	2

Semifinals
Hong Kexin (CHN)	10
Kwon Young-jin (KOR)	0
Batkhuyagiin Khulan (MGL)	8^{F}
Sara Natami (JPN)	1

Final
Hong Kexin (CHN)	10^{F}
Batkhuyagiin Khulan (MGL)	0

Repechage round 1
Tancholpon Kybalbekova (KGZ)	1
Manisha Bhanwala (IND)	12

Bronze medals
Nguyễn Thị Mỹ Trang (VIE)	2
Kwon Young-jin (KOR)	7
Manisha Bhanwala (IND)	0
Sara Natami (JPN)	10

=== 59 kg ===
8–9 April

Quarterfinals		Semifinals		Final
Viktoriia Khusainova (KAZ)	0
Neha Sangwan (IND)	10^{F}	Neha Sangwan (IND)	5
Xie Mengyu (CHN)	11	Xie Mengyu (CHN)	12
Khürelkhüügiin Bolortuyaa (MGL)	0			Xie Mengyu (CHN)	8
Ahn Hye-bin (KOR)	0			Sena Nagamoto (JPN)	6
Ulmeken Esenbaeva (UZB)	6^{F}	Ulmeken Esenbaeva (UZB)	0
Sezim Zhumanazarova (KGZ)	0	Sena Nagamoto (JPN)	10
Sena Nagamoto (JPN)	10

Bronze medals
Khürelkhüügiin Bolortuyaa (MGL)	4
Neha Sangwan (IND)	10
Sezim Zhumanazarova (KGZ)	12
Ulmeken Esenbaeva (UZB)	13^{F}

=== 62 kg ===
9–10 April

Round of 16
Dilnaz Sazanova (KGZ)	0
Zhang Qi (CHN)	10
Jo Su-been (KOR)	1
Pai Hsin-ping (TPE)	6
Sükheegiin Tserenchimed (MGL)	1
Mun Hyon-gyong (PRK)	2

Quarterfinals
Nonoka Ozaki (JPN)	10
Zhang Qi (CHN)	0
Nigina Sabirova (UZB)	10
Balqis Taaibin (JOR)	0
Tynys Dubek (KAZ)	9
Pai Hsin-ping (TPE)	2
Mun Hyon-gyong (PRK)	3
Mansi Ahlawat (IND)	0

Semifinals
Nonoka Ozaki (JPN)	8^{F}
Nigina Sabirova (UZB)	0
Tynys Dubek (KAZ)	0
Mun Hyon-gyong (PRK)	11

Final
Nonoka Ozaki (JPN)	10
Mun Hyon-gyong (PRK)	0

Repechage round 1
Sükheegiin Tserenchimed (MGL)	10
Mansi Ahlawat (IND)	0

Bronze medals
Zhang Qi (CHN)	4^{F}
Nigina Sabirova (UZB)	0
Sükheegiin Tserenchimed (MGL)	7^{F}
Tynys Dubek (KAZ)	0

=== 65 kg ===
9–10 April

Round of 16
Lili (CHN)	10
Tala Abukheit (JOR)	0

Quarterfinals
Gulnura Tashtanbekova (KGZ)	0
Lili (CHN)	10
Firuza Esenbaeva (UZB)	5
Nyamsürengiin Narkhajid (MGL)	5
Aizhan Suiduova (KAZ)	2
Lee Han-bit (KOR)	10^{F}
Monika Sheoran (IND)	1
Nana Ikehata (JPN)	10

Semifinals
Lili (CHN)	4^{F}
Firuza Esenbaeva (UZB)	0
Lee Han-bit (KOR)	0
Nana Ikehata (JPN)	4

Final
Lili (CHN)	3
Nana Ikehata (JPN)	2

Repechage round 1
Tala Abukheit (JOR)	0
Gulnura Tashtanbekova (KGZ)	10

Bronze medals
Gulnura Tashtanbekova (KGZ)	4^{F}
Firuza Esenbaeva (UZB)	2
Monika Sheoran (IND)	9
Lee Han-bit (KOR)	0

=== 68 kg ===
8–9 April

Round of 16
Cai Sheng-fang (TPE)	4
Đặng Thị Linh (VIE)	15
Svetlana Oknazarova (UZB)	0
Enkhsaikhany Delgermaa (MGL)	11

Quarterfinals
Meerim Zhumanazarova (KGZ)	11
Đặng Thị Linh (VIE)	0
Li Zelu (CHN)	2
Mansi Lather (IND)	1
Miwa Morikawa (JPN)	10
Yelena Shalygina (KAZ)	1
Enkhsaikhany Delgermaa (MGL)	9^{F}
Park Hyeon-yeong (KOR)	0

Semifinals
Meerim Zhumanazarova (KGZ)	1
Li Zelu (CHN)	1
Miwa Morikawa (JPN)	7
Enkhsaikhany Delgermaa (MGL)	0

Final
Meerim Zhumanazarova (KGZ)	2
Miwa Morikawa (JPN)	1

Bronze medals
Đặng Thị Linh (VIE)	0
Li Zelu (CHN)	10
Yelena Shalygina (KAZ)	1
Enkhsaikhany Delgermaa (MGL)	3^{F}

=== 72 kg ===
9–10 April

Quarterfinals		Semifinals		Final
Nurzat Nurtaeva (KGZ)	10
Kim Soo-bin (KOR)	0	Nurzat Nurtaeva (KGZ)	1
Long Jia (CHN)	10	Long Jia (CHN)	11
Erdene-Ochiryn Odgerel (MGL)	0			Long Jia (CHN)	10
Mahiro Yoshitake (JPN)	4^{F}			Mahiro Yoshitake (JPN)	2
Sevinchoy Polvonova (UZB)	0	Mahiro Yoshitake (JPN)	7^{F}
Harshita Mor (IND)	6	Harshita Mor (IND)	2
Zhamila Bakbergenova (KAZ)	5

Bronze medals
Erdene-Ochiryn Odgerel (MGL)	0
Nurzat Nurtaeva (KGZ)	2
Sevinchoy Polvonova (UZB)	0
Harshita Mor (IND)	5^{F}

=== 76 kg ===
8–9 April

Round of 16
Li Wenji (CHN)	12
Yasuha Matsuyuki (JPN)	2

Quarterfinals
Aiperi Medet Kyzy (KGZ)	6^{F}
Li Wenji (CHN)	6
Chang Hui-tsz (TPE)	3
Ozoda Zaripboeva (UZB)	1
Gulmaral Yerkebayeva (KAZ)	5
Kajal Dhochak (IND)	3
Hwang Eun-ju (KOR)	2
Enkh-Amaryn Davaanasan (MGL)	8

Semifinals
Aiperi Medet Kyzy (KGZ)	11
Chang Hui-tsz (TPE)	0
Gulmaral Yerkebayeva (KAZ)	2
Enkh-Amaryn Davaanasan (MGL)	7

Final
Aiperi Medet Kyzy (KGZ)	2
Enkh-Amaryn Davaanasan (MGL)	4

Bronze medals
Li Wenji (CHN)	5
Chang Hui-tsz (TPE)	0
Hwang Eun-ju (KOR)	1
Gulmaral Yerkebayeva (KAZ)	5
