= 2024 Asian Wrestling Olympic Qualification Tournament =

Wrestling competition held in Bishkek, Kyrgyzstan

- Host city: Bishkek, Kyrgyzstan
- Dates: 19–21 April 2024
- Stadium: Bishkek Arena

The 2024 Asian Wrestling Olympic Qualification Tournament was the fifth qualifying tournament for the 2024 Summer Olympics. The event was held from 19 to 21 April 2024, in Bishkek, Kyrgyzstan. The 2024 Asian Wrestling Championships were held at the same venue.

== Qualification summary ==
NOC	Men's freestyle						Men's Greco-Roman						Women's freestyle						Total
NOC	57	65	74	86	97	125	60	67	77	87	97	130	50	53	57	62	68	76	Total
China										Yes				Yes	Yes			Yes	4
Japan		Yes		Yes				Yes											3
India													Yes		Yes			Yes	3
Iran			Yes		Yes				Yes	Yes									4
Kazakhstan					Yes	Yes	Yes		Yes			Yes							5
Kyrgyzstan	Yes	Yes						Yes									Yes		4
Mongolia				Yes		Yes										Yes			3
North Korea							Yes							Yes		Yes	Yes		4
South Korea											Yes	Yes							2
Uzbekistan	Yes		Yes								Yes		Yes						4
Total:10 NOCs	2	2	2	2	2	2	2	2	2	2	2	2	2	2	2	2	2	2	36

== Men's freestyle ==
=== 57 kg ===
19 April

Round of 16
Ali Aburumaila (PLE)	2
Bekzat Almaz Uulu (KGZ)	9
Muhammad Bilal (PAK)	2
Batkhuyagiin Mönkh-Erdene (MGL)	8
Ahmad Javan (IRI)	10
Aiaal Belolyubskii (TJK)	0
Gulomjon Abdullaev (UZB)	4^{F}
Käbe Mätjanow (TKM)	0
Han Chong-song (PRK)	10
Gayan Ekanayake (SRI)	0
Khattab Umer (IRQ)	1
Kim Sung-gwon (KOR)	1
Yerassyl Mukhtaruly (KAZ)	0
Aman Sehrawat (IND)	10

Quarterfinals
Zou Wanhao (CHN)	2
Bekzat Almaz Uulu (KGZ)	3
Batkhuyagiin Mönkh-Erdene (MGL)	14
Ahmad Javan (IRI)	3
Gulomjon Abdullaev (UZB)	7
Han Chong-song (PRK)	1
Kim Sung-gwon (KOR)	1
Aman Sehrawat (IND)	11

Semifinals
Bekzat Almaz Uulu (KGZ)	3
Batkhuyagiin Mönkh-Erdene (MGL)	3
Gulomjon Abdullaev (UZB)	10^{F}
Aman Sehrawat (IND)	0

Qualified athletes
Bekzat Almaz Uulu (KGZ)	Q
Gulomjon Abdullaev (UZB)	Q

=== 65 kg ===
19 April

Round of 32
Alibeg Alibegov (BRN)	6–6	Yun Jun-sik (KOR)

Round of 16
Abdulmazhid Kudiev (TJK)	7
Kotaro Kiyooka (JPN)	10
Yun Jun-sik (KOR)	11
Charles Fernando (SRI)	0
Maiis Aliyev (KAZ)	10
Abdullah Assaf (PLE)	0
Yuan Shaohua (CHN)	3
Muhammad Abdullah (PAK)	3
Mohammed Al-Jawad (IRQ)	0
Ernazar Akmataliev (KGZ)	10
Tseveensürengiin Tsogbadrakh (MGL)	10
Ibrahim Guzan (YEM)	0
Umidjon Jalolov (UZB)	WO
~~Sujeet Kalkal (IND)~~
Kim Kwang-jin (PRK)	9
Jelaletdin Seýidow (TKM)	0

Quarterfinals
Kotaro Kiyooka (JPN)	10
Yun Jun-sik (KOR)	0
Maiis Aliyev (KAZ)	15
Yuan Shaohua (CHN)	16
Ernazar Akmataliev (KGZ)	12
Tseveensürengiin Tsogbadrakh (MGL)	6
Umidjon Jalolov (UZB)	2
Kim Kwang-jin (PRK)	5

Semifinals
Kotaro Kiyooka (JPN)	11
Yuan Shaohua (CHN)	0
Ernazar Akmataliev (KGZ)	5
Kim Kwang-jin (PRK)	3

Qualified athletes
Kotaro Kiyooka (JPN)	Q
Ernazar Akmataliev (KGZ)	Q

=== 74 kg ===
19 April

Round of 16
Bekzod Abdurakhmonov (UZB)	10
Magomet Evloev (TJK)	4
Orozobek Toktomambetov (KGZ)	7
Magomedrasul Asluev (BRN)	1
Jaideep Narwal (IND)	6^{F}
Alp Arslan Begenjow (TKM)	4
Nurkozha Kaipanov (KAZ)	10
Fierre Afan (PHI)	0
Muhammad Asad Ullah (PAK)	10
Lakmal Wijesooriya (SRI)	0
Olonbayaryn Süldkhüü (MGL)	0
Gong Byung-min (KOR)	10

Quarterfinals
Lu Feng (CHN)	9
Bekzod Abdurakhmonov (UZB)	15^{F}
Orozobek Toktomambetov (KGZ)	2
Jaideep Narwal (IND)	2
Nurkozha Kaipanov (KAZ)	10
Muhammad Asad Ullah (PAK)	0
Gong Byung-min (KOR)	4
Younes Emami (IRI)	15

Semifinals
Bekzod Abdurakhmonov (UZB)	6
Orozobek Toktomambetov (KGZ)	0
Nurkozha Kaipanov (KAZ)	0
Younes Emami (IRI)	11

Qualified athletes
Bekzod Abdurakhmonov (UZB)	Q
Younes Emami (IRI)	Q

- Alp Arslan Begenjow of Turkmenistan originally finished 11th, but got disqualified.

=== 86 kg ===
19 April

Round of 16
Kim Gwan-uk (KOR)	6
Döwletmyrat Orazgylyjow (TKM)	5
Nurtilek Karypbaev (KGZ)	10
Heng Vuthy (CAM)	0

Quarterfinals
Magomed Sharipov (BRN)	2
Kim Gwan-uk (KOR)	5
Hayato Ishiguro (JPN)	WO
~~Deepak Punia (IND)~~
Byambasürengiin Bat-Erdene (MGL)	9
Erzo Isakov (JOR)	1
Nurtilek Karypbaev (KGZ)	0
Lin Zushen (CHN)	10

Semifinals
Kim Gwan-uk (KOR)	0
Hayato Ishiguro (JPN)	10
Byambasürengiin Bat-Erdene (MGL)	1
Lin Zushen (CHN)	1

Qualified athletes
Hayato Ishiguro (JPN)	Q
Byambasürengiin Bat-Erdene (MGL)	Q

=== 97 kg ===
19 April

Round of 16
Şatlyk Hemelýäýew (TKM)	8
Andrey Aronov (KGZ)	10
Arash Yoshida (JPN)	10
Deepak Nehra (IND)	0

Quarterfinals
Alisher Yergali (KAZ)	10
Andrey Aronov (KGZ)	0
Seo Ju-hwan (KOR)	2
Habila Awusayiman (CHN)	6^{F}
Magomed Ibragimov (UZB)	5
Ganbaataryn Gankhuyag (MGL)	12^{F}
Arash Yoshida (JPN)	1
Amir Ali Azarpira (IRI)	9

Semifinals
Alisher Yergali (KAZ)	3
Habila Awusayiman (CHN)	2
Ganbaataryn Gankhuyag (MGL)	0
Amir Ali Azarpira (IRI)	3

Qualified athletes
Alisher Yergali (KAZ)	Q
Amir Ali Azarpira (IRI)	Q

=== 125 kg ===
19 April

Round of 16
Jung Yei-hyun (KOR)	11
Zyýamuhammet Saparow (TKM)	9
Mönkhtöriin Lkhagvagerel (MGL)	10
Taiki Yamamoto (JPN)	0
Omar Sarem (SYR)	0
Khasanboy Rakhimov (UZB)	4^{F}
Yusup Batirmurzaev (KAZ)	11^{F}
Zaman Anwar (PAK)	0

Quarterfinals
Deng Zhiwei (CHN)	5
Jung Yei-hyun (KOR)	0
Mönkhtöriin Lkhagvagerel (MGL)	10
Sumit Malik (IND)	0
Shamil Sharipov (BRN)	2
Khasanboy Rakhimov (UZB)	1
Yusup Batirmurzaev (KAZ)	5^{F}
Aiaal Lazarev (KGZ)	0

Semifinals
Deng Zhiwei (CHN)	0
Mönkhtöriin Lkhagvagerel (MGL)	2
Shamil Sharipov (BRN)	3
Yusup Batirmurzaev (KAZ)	7

Qualified athletes
Mönkhtöriin Lkhagvagerel (MGL)	Q
Yusup Batirmurzaev (KAZ)	Q

== Men's Greco-Roman ==
=== 60 kg ===
21 April

Round of 16
Sajjad Ali (IRQ)	0
Aidos Sultangali (KAZ)	9
Mark Ervin Oliveros (PHI)	0
Suparmanto (INA)	8
Alexander Cuevas (SGP)	0
Huang Jui-chi (TPE)	9
Sumit Dalal (IND)	2
Ri Se-ung (PRK)	6
Kim Da-hyun (KOR)	6
Munthir Jandu (KSA)	1

Quarterfinals
Aslamjon Azizov (TJK)	1
Aidos Sultangali (KAZ)	2
Suparmanto (INA)	4
Huang Jui-chi (TPE)	4^{F}
Umit Durdyýew (TKM)	0
Ri Se-ung (PRK)	9
Kim Da-hyun (KOR)	9
Tseveenravdangiin Baljinnyam (MGL)	0

Semifinals
Aidos Sultangali (KAZ)	10^{F}
Huang Jui-chi (TPE)	0
Ri Se-ung (PRK)	3
Kim Da-hyun (KOR)	0

Qualified athletes
Aidos Sultangali (KAZ)	Q
Ri Se-ung (PRK)	Q

=== 67 kg ===
21 April

Round of 16
Karrar Abbas (IRQ)	4
Ro Yong-jin (PRK)	12
Faisal Al-Dossary (KSA)	4
Mohamad Al-Obeid (SYR)	4
Husiyuetu (CHN)	9
Firuz Mirzoradzhabov (TJK)	1
Kyotaro Sogabe (JPN)	9
Ryu Han-su (KOR)	0
Muhammad Aliansyah (INA)	9
Jason Baucas (PHI)	0
Ashu Bazard (IND)	0
Abror Atabaev (UZB)	8
Meirzhan Shermakhanbet (KAZ)	10
Röwşen Atdaýew (TKM)	1

Quarterfinals
Amantur Ismailov (KGZ)	11
Ro Yong-jin (PRK)	0
Faisal Al-Dossary (KSA)	1
Husiyuetu (CHN)	9
Kyotaro Sogabe (JPN)	8
Muhammad Aliansyah (INA)	0
Abror Atabaev (UZB)	3
Meirzhan Shermakhanbet (KAZ)	6

Semifinals
Amantur Ismailov (KGZ)	9
Husiyuetu (CHN)	1
Kyotaro Sogabe (JPN)	11
Meirzhan Shermakhanbet (KAZ)	2

Qualified athletes
Amantur Ismailov (KGZ)	Q
Kyotaro Sogabe (JPN)	Q

=== 77 kg ===
21 April

Round of 16
Hassan Barnawi (KSA)	5
Bazargeldi Ezimow (TKM)	6^{F}

Quarterfinals
Demeu Zhadrayev (KAZ)	9
Bazargeldi Ezimow (TKM)	0
Lee Do-won (KOR)	8
Gadiel Raid (SGP)	0
Vikas Dalal (IND)	0
Liu Rui (CHN)	7^{F}
Amin Kavianinejad (IRI)	7
Ali Mohammed (IRQ)	1

Semifinals
Demeu Zhadrayev (KAZ)	5
Lee Do-won (KOR)	2
Liu Rui (CHN)	5
Amin Kavianinejad (IRI)	6

Qualified athletes
Demeu Zhadrayev (KAZ)	Q
Amin Kavianinejad (IRI)	Q

=== 87 kg ===
21 April

Round of 16
Aryan Azman (SGP)	0
Qian Haitao (CHN)	8
Asan Zhanyshov (KGZ)	11
Yhlas Abdurazakow (TKM)	1
So Sakabe (JPN)	1
Sunil Kumar (IND)	5

Quarterfinals
Park Sang-hyeok (KOR)	3
Qian Haitao (CHN)	8
Sultan Ali Eid (JOR)	5^{F}
Sukhrob Abdulkhaev (TJK)	1
Alireza Mohmadi (IRI)	6
Asan Zhanyshov (KGZ)	3
Sunil Kumar (IND)	2
Jalgasbay Berdimuratov (UZB)	4

Semifinals
Qian Haitao (CHN)	7
Sultan Ali Eid (JOR)	0
Alireza Mohmadi (IRI)	3
Jalgasbay Berdimuratov (UZB)	2

Qualified athletes
Qian Haitao (CHN)	Q
Alireza Mohmadi (IRI)	Q

=== 97 kg ===
21 April

Round of 16
Olzhas Syrlybay (KAZ)	1
Yuri Nakazato (JPN)	2
Kim Seung-jun (KOR)	7
Li Yiming (CHN)	7

Quarterfinals
Rustam Assakalov (UZB)	9
Yuri Nakazato (JPN)	0
Nitesh Siwach (IND)	0
Uzur Dzhuzupbekov (KGZ)	10
Mirzoamin Safarov (TJK)	1
Ibrahim Fallatah (KSA)	3
Kim Seung-jun (KOR)	5
Amanberdi Agamämmedow (TKM)	4

Semifinals
Rustam Assakalov (UZB)	3
Uzur Dzhuzupbekov (KGZ)	1
Ibrahim Fallatah (KSA)	1
Kim Seung-jun (KOR)	5

Qualified athletes
Rustam Assakalov (UZB)	Q
Kim Seung-jun (KOR)	Q

=== 130 kg ===
21 April

Quarterfinals		Semifinals		Qualified athletes
Lee Seung-chan (KOR)	9
Naveen Sevlia (IND)	1	Lee Seung-chan (KOR)	9
Sota Okumura (JPN)	12	Sota Okumura (JPN)	0
Temurbek Nasimov (UZB)	6			Lee Seung-chan (KOR)	Q
Aýbegşazada Kürräýew (TKM)	0			Alimkhan Syzdykov (KAZ)	Q
Alimkhan Syzdykov (KAZ)	9	Alimkhan Syzdykov (KAZ)	7
Roman Kim (KGZ)	4	Roman Kim (KGZ)	7
Ali Yaseen (IRQ)	1

== Women's freestyle ==
=== 50 kg ===
20 April

Round of 16
Kim Son-hyang (PRK)	7
Aktenge Keunimjaeva (UZB)	7
Cheon Mi-ran (KOR)	0
Vinesh Phogat (IND)	10
Laura Ganikyzy (KAZ)	12
Vatansulton Shakarshoeva (TJK)	7

Quarterfinals
Nguyễn Thị Xuân (VIE)	1
Aktenge Keunimjaeva (UZB)	3
Hsieh Meng-hsuan (TPE)	5^{F}
Nipuni Wasana (SRI)	0
Dit Samnang (CAM)	0
Vinesh Phogat (IND)	2^{F}
Laura Ganikyzy (KAZ)	5^{F}
Jiah Pingot (PHI)	0

Semifinals
Aktenge Keunimjaeva (UZB)	4
Hsieh Meng-hsuan (TPE)	2
Vinesh Phogat (IND)	10
Laura Ganikyzy (KAZ)	0

Qualified athletes
Aktenge Keunimjaeva (UZB)	Q
Vinesh Phogat (IND)	Q

=== 53 kg ===
20 April

Round of 16
Batkhuyagiin Khulan (MGL)	8
Park Seo-young (KOR)	6
Aliah Rose Gavalez (PHI)	0
Choe Hyo-gyong (PRK)	10

Quarterfinals
Pang Qianyu (CHN)	5
Batkhuyagiin Khulan (MGL)	2
Shokhida Akhmedova (UZB)	6
Aizhan Sabyrbek Kyzy (KGZ)	4
Nguyễn Thị Mỹ Trang (VIE)	1
Zhuldyz Eshimova (KAZ)	2
Choe Hyo-gyong (PRK)	2^{F}
Nethmi Ahinsa (SRI)	0

Semifinals
Pang Qianyu (CHN)	10
Shokhida Akhmedova (UZB)	0
Zhuldyz Eshimova (KAZ)	0
Choe Hyo-gyong (PRK)	4

Qualified athletes
Pang Qianyu (CHN)	Q
Choe Hyo-gyong (PRK)	Q

=== 57 kg ===
20 April

Quarterfinals		Semifinals		Qualified athletes
Hong Kexin (CHN)	11
Emma Tissina (KAZ)	0	Hong Kexin (CHN)	6^{F}
Jong In-sun (PRK)	11	Jong In-sun (PRK)	8
Khürelkhüügiin Bolortuyaa (MGL)	0			Hong Kexin (CHN)	Q
Laylokhon Sobirova (UZB)	13			Anshu Malik (IND)	Q
Kwon Young-jin (KOR)	2	Laylokhon Sobirova (UZB)	0
Anshu Malik (IND)	12	Anshu Malik (IND)	11
Kalmira Bilimbek Kyzy (KGZ)	1

=== 62 kg ===
20 April

Quarterfinals		Semifinals		Qualified athletes
Pürevdorjiin Orkhon (MGL)	13
Gulmira Aitmuratova (UZB)	2	Pürevdorjiin Orkhon (MGL)	4^{F}
Lee Han-bit (KOR)	6	Lee Han-bit (KOR)	0
Arian Carpio (PHI)	2			Pürevdorjiin Orkhon (MGL)	Q
Long Jia (CHN)	0			Mun Hyon-gyong (PRK)	Q
Mun Hyon-gyong (PRK)	6^{F}	Mun Hyon-gyong (PRK)	6
Mansi Ahlawat (IND)	6	Mansi Ahlawat (IND)	0
Irina Kuznetsova (KAZ)	4

=== 68 kg ===
20 April

Pos	Athlete	Pld	W	L	CP	TP	CHN	UZB	KOR
1	Zhou Feng (CHN)	2	2	0	8	21	—	11–0	10–0
2	Nabira Esenbaeva (UZB)	2	1	1	5	8	0–4 SU	—	8–1 Fall
3	Ha Oh-young (KOR)	2	0	2	0	1	0–4 SU	0–5 FA	—

Source: UWW

Pos	Athlete	Pld	W	L	CP	TP	KGZ	PRK	IND	KAZ
1	Meerim Zhumanazarova (KGZ)	3	2	1	11	17	—	2–6	9–1 Fall	6–2 Fall
2	Pak Sol-gum (PRK)	3	2	1	8	19	3–1 PO1	—	3–8	10–0
3	Nisha Dahiya (IND)	3	2	1	7	19	0–5 FA	3–1 PO1	—	10–0
4	Yelena Shalygina (KAZ)	3	0	3	0	2	0–5 FA	0–4 SU	0–4 SU	—

Source: UWW

Semifinals		Qualified athletes
Zhou Feng (CHN)	4
Pak Sol-gum (PRK)	7	Pak Sol-gum (PRK)	Q
Meerim Zhumanazarova (KGZ)	7	Meerim Zhumanazarova (KGZ)	Q
Nabira Esenbaeva (UZB)	2

=== 76 kg ===
20 April

Pos	Athlete	Pld	W	L	CP	TP	IND	CHN	MGL	KOR
1	Reetika Hooda (IND)	3	3	0	11	30	—	9–6	11–0	10–0
2	Wang Juan (CHN)	3	2	1	8	23	1–3 PO1	—	7–2	10–0
3	Enkh-Amaryn Davaanasan (MGL)	3	1	2	4	10	0–4 SU	1–3 PO1	—	8–5
4	Hwang Eun-ju (KOR)	3	0	3	1	5	0–4 SU	0–4 SU	1–3 PO1	—

Source: UWW

Pos	Athlete	Pld	W	L	CP	TP	KAZ	TPE	UZB
1	Zhamila Bakbergenova (KAZ)	2	2	0	7	21	—	8–0	13–2
2	Chang Hui-tsz (TPE)	2	1	1	5	5	0–3 PO	—	5–4 Fall
3	Svetlana Oknazarova (UZB)	2	0	2	1	6	1–4 SU1	0–5 FA	—

Source: UWW

Semifinals
Reetika Hooda (IND)	7
Chang Hui-tsz (TPE)	0
Zhamila Bakbergenova (KAZ)	1
Wang Juan (CHN)	6

Qualified athletes
Reetika Hooda (IND)	Q
Wang Juan (CHN)	Q
3rd place
Chang Hui-tsz (TPE)
Zhamila Bakbergenova (KAZ)	WO
