= 2026 World Wrestling Championships – Women's freestyle 57 kg =

Women's freestyle 57 kg at the 2026 World Championships
- Venue: Barys Arena
- Dates: 27–28 October 2026
- Competitors: 24 from 24 nations

Medalists
gold medal	Hong Kexin	China
silver medal	Sena Nagamoto	Japan
bronze medal	Iryna Kurachkina	Belarus
bronze medal	Helen Maroulis	United States

The women's freestyle 57 kilograms is a competition featured at the 2026 World Wrestling Championships, and was held in Astana, Kazakhstan on 27 and 28 October 2026.

This freestyle wrestling competition consists of a single-elimination tournament, with a repechage used to determine the winner of two bronze medals. The two finalists face off for gold and silver medals. Each wrestler who loses to one of the two finalists moves into the repechage, culminating in a pair of bronze medal matches, featuring the semifinal losers each facing the remaining repechage opponent from their half of the bracket.

== Results ==
Legend

- F — Won by fall

=== Final ===
Final
Hong Kexin (CHN)	10
Sena Nagamoto (JPN)	0

=== Top half ===
Round of 32
Batkhuyagiin Khulan (MGL)	7
Giullia Penalber (BRA)	3
Tamara Dollák (HUN)	0
Zhala Aliyeva (AZE)	4^{F}
Zineb Ech-Chabki (MAR)	0
Jumoke Adekoye (NGR)	10
Achouak Djamila Tekouk (ALG)	2
Neha Sharma (IND)	4

Round of 16
Hong Kexin (CHN)	11
Batkhuyagiin Khulan (MGL)	0
Zhala Aliyeva (AZE)	8
Magdalena Głodek (POL)	14
Elvira Süleyman Kamaloğlu (TUR)	6
Jumoke Adekoye (NGR)	3
Neha Sharma (IND)	1
Iryna Kurachkina (BLR)	4

Quarterfinals
Hong Kexin (CHN)	10
Magdalena Głodek (POL)	0
Elvira Süleyman Kamaloğlu (TUR)	0
Iryna Kurachkina (BLR)	8

Semifinals
Hong Kexin (CHN)	10
Iryna Kurachkina (BLR)	0

=== Bottom half ===
Round of 32
Oleksandra Khomenets (UKR)	6^{F}
Nethmi Ahinsa (SRI)	8
Anastasiia Iandushkina (RUS)	2
Victoria Báez (ESP)	1
Ulmeken Esenbaeva (UZB)	0
Sena Nagamoto (JPN)	11
Mia Friesen (CAN)	10
Danielle Lim (SGP)	0

Round of 16
Evelina Hulthén (SWE)	4
Oleksandra Khomenets (UKR)	9
Anastasiia Iandushkina (RUS)	5
Nilufar Raimova (KAZ)	8
Luisa Valverde (ECU)	0
Sena Nagamoto (JPN)	7
Mia Friesen (CAN)	0
Helen Maroulis (USA)	11

Quarterfinals
Oleksandra Khomenets (UKR)	6
Nilufar Raimova (KAZ)	12^{F}
Sena Nagamoto (JPN)	4
Helen Maroulis (USA)	2

Semifinals
Nilufar Raimova (KAZ)	0
Sena Nagamoto (JPN)	11

=== Repechage ===
Repechage round 1
Ulmeken Esenbaeva (UZB)	4
Luisa Valverde (ECU)	4^{F}

Repechage round 2
Batkhuyagiin Khulan (MGL)	10
Magdalena Głodek (POL)	0
Luisa Valverde (ECU)	0
Helen Maroulis (USA)	8^{F}

Bronze medals
Batkhuyagiin Khulan (MGL)	11
Iryna Kurachkina (BLR)	12
Helen Maroulis (USA)	5
Nilufar Raimova (KAZ)	2

== Final standing ==
Rank	Athlete
1st place, gold medalist(s)	Hong Kexin (CHN)
2nd place, silver medalist(s)	Sena Nagamoto (JPN)
3rd place, bronze medalist(s)	Iryna Kurachkina (BLR)
3rd place, bronze medalist(s)	Helen Maroulis (USA)
5	Batkhuyagiin Khulan (MGL)
5	Nilufar Raimova (KAZ)
7	Oleksandra Khomenets (UKR)
8	Zhala Aliyeva (AZE)
9	Luisa Valverde (ECU)
10	Jumoke Adekoye (NGR)
11	Mia Friesen (CAN)
12	Anastasiia Iandushkina (RUS)
13	Neha Sharma (IND)
14	Magdalena Głodek (POL)
15	Elvira Süleyman Kamaloğlu (TUR)
16	Evelina Hulthén (SWE)
17	Giullia Penalber (BRA)
18	Achouak Djamila Tekouk (ALG)
19	Victoria Báez (ESP)
20	Nethmi Ahinsa (SRI)
21	Ulmeken Esenbaeva (UZB)
22	Tamara Dollák (HUN)
23	Zineb Ech-Chabki (MAR)
24	Danielle Lim (SGP)
