= Sara Natami =

Japanese freestyle wrestler

Personal information
- Native name: 屶網さら
- Born: 6 November 2000 (age 25) Osaka Prefecture, Japan
- Height: 1.60 m (5 ft 3 in)
- Weight: 57 kg (126 lb; 9.0 st)

Sport
- Country: Japan
- Sport: Wrestling
- Weight class: 57 kg
- Event: Freestyle
Medal record
Women's freestyle wrestling
Representing Japan
Asian Championships
Gold medal – first place	2022 Ulaanbaatar	59 kg
Gold medal – first place	2025 Amman	57 kg
Silver medal – second place	2018 Bishkek	57 kg
Bronze medal – third place	2026 Bishkek	57 kg
Dan Kolov - Nikola Petrov Tournament
Gold medal – first place	2023 Sofia	59 kg
World U23 Championships
Gold medal – first place	2023 Tirana	57 kg
Japan National Championships
Gold medal – first place	2019 Tokyo	59 kg
Gold medal – first place	2024 Tokyo	57 kg
Bronze medal – third place	2023 Tokyo	57 kg

Sara Natami (born 6 November 2000) is a Japanese freestyle wrestler competing in the 57 kg division. She won the gold medal at the 2022 Asian Wrestling Championships and 2025 Asian Wrestling Championships.

== Career ==
In the 2025 Asian Wrestling Championships held in Amman, Jordan, after passing the first round bye, she reached the final by defeating Mongolian Khürelkhüügiin Bolortuyaa with 11-0 technical superiority in the quarterfinals and Chinese Hong Kexin in the semifinals with a pin while leading 2–0. In the final match, she drew 2–2 with North Korea's Son Il-sim and won the gold medal by defeating his opponent with the advantage of the last point.
