= 2023 U23 World Wrestling Championships – Men's Greco-Roman 97 kg =

Wrestling competitions

Men's Greco-Roman 97 kg at the 2023 U23 World Championships
- Venue: Tirana Olympic Park
- Dates: 27–28 October
- Competitors: 21 from 18 nations

Medalists
| gold medal | Pavel Hlinchuk | Authorised Neutral Athletes |
| silver medal | Mustafa Olgun | Turkey |
| bronze medal | Yuri Nakazato | Japan |
| bronze medal | Lucas Lazogianis | Germany |

The men's Greco-Roman 97 kilograms is a competition featured at the 2023 U23 World Wrestling Championships, and was held in Tirana, Albania on 27 and 28 October 2023.

This Greco-Roman wrestling competition consists of a single-elimination tournament, with a repechage used to determine the winner of two bronze medals. The two finalists face off for gold and silver medals. Each wrestler who loses to one of the two finalists moves into the repechage, culminating in a pair of bronze medal matches featuring the semifinal losers each facing the remaining repechage opponent from their half of the bracket.

== Results ==
Legend

- F — Won by fall

=== Final ===
| Final |
| Mustafa Olgun (TUR) | 3 |
| Pavel Hlinchuk (ANA) | 4 |

=== Top half ===
Round of 32
Murad Ahmadiyev (AZE) | 9
Kristián Lukáč (CRO) | 0
Yerzat Yerlanov (KAZ) | 1
Richard Karelson (EST) | 3
Arkyt Orozbekov (KGZ) | 0
Yuri Nakazato (JPN) | 9

Round of 16
Mustafa Olgun (TUR) | 9
Nitesh Siwach (UWW) | 0
Murad Ahmadiyev (AZE) | 9
Luka Katić (SRB) | 1
Valentyn Shkliarenko (UKR) | 1
Richard Karelson (EST) | 1
Yuri Nakazato (JPN) | 3
Roman Balchivschii (MDA) | 0

Quarterfinals
Mustafa Olgun (TUR) | 2
Murad Ahmadiyev (AZE) | 0
Valentyn Shkliarenko (UKR) | 0
Yuri Nakazato (JPN) | 8

Semifinals
Mustafa Olgun (TUR) | 7
Yuri Nakazato (JPN) | 4

=== Bottom half ===
Round of 32
Lasha Tvildiani (GEO) | 1
Hayk Khloyan (ARM) | 4
Jakub Antoszewski (POL) | 0
Pavel Hlinchuk (ANA) | 11

Round of 16
Juan Díaz (VEN) | 0
Cade Lautt (USA) | 4^{F}
Hayk Khloyan (ARM) | 7
Artur Arzumanian (ANA) | 2
Marcus Worren (NOR) | 5
Pavel Hlinchuk (ANA) | 9
Lucas Lazogianis (GER) | 4
Alex Szőke (HUN) | 4

Quarterfinals
Cade Lautt (USA) | 0
Hayk Khloyan (ARM) | 8
Pavel Hlinchuk (ANA) | 9
Lucas Lazogianis (GER) | 0

Semifinals
Hayk Khloyan (ARM) | 0
Pavel Hlinchuk (ANA) | 9

=== Repechage ===
Repechage round 1
Jakub Antoszewski (POL) | 3
Marcus Worren (NOR) | 3

Repechage round 2
Nitesh Siwach (UWW) | 1
Murad Ahmadiyev (AZE) | 6^{F}
Marcus Worren (NOR) | 1
Lucas Lazogianis (GER) | 7^{F}

Bronze medals
Murad Ahmadiyev (AZE) | 1
Yuri Nakazato (JPN) | 3
Lucas Lazogianis (GER) | 5
Hayk Khloyan (ARM) | 3
