= Wrestling at the 2026 Asian Games – Women's freestyle 57 kg =

Women's freestyle 57 kg at the 2026 Asian Games
- Venue: Inae Sports Center
- Date: 3 October 2026
- Competitors: 14 from 14 nations

Medalists
| gold medal | Hong Kexin | China |
| silver medal | Son Il-sim | North Korea |
| bronze medal | Nilufar Raimova | Kazakhstan |
| bronze medal | Akari Fujinami | Japan |

The women's freestyle 57 kilograms wrestling competition at the 2026 Asian Games in Nagoya was held on 3 October 2026 at the Inae Sports Center.

This freestyle wrestling competition consists of a single-elimination tournament, with a repechage used to determine the winner of two bronze medals. The two finalists face off for gold and silver medals. Each wrestler who loses to one of the two finalists moves into the repechage, culminating in a pair of bronze medal matches featuring the semifinal losers each facing the remaining repechage opponent from their half of the bracket.

== Schedule ==
All times are Japan Standard Time (UTC+09:00)

| Date | Time | Event |
|---|---|---|
| Saturday, 3 October 2026 | 10:30 | 1/8 finals |
| Saturday, 3 October 2026 | 10:30 | 1/4 finals |
| Saturday, 3 October 2026 | 10:30 | Semifinals |
| Saturday, 3 October 2026 | 10:30 | Repechages |
| Saturday, 3 October 2026 | 18:00 | Finals |

== Results ==
Legend

- F — Won by fall

=== Main bracket ===
1/8 finals
Mutoharoh (INA) | 0
Laylokhon Sobirova (UZB) | 10
Liao Pei-ying (TPE) | 10
Miriam Grace Balisme (PHI) | 0
Hong Kexin (CHN) | 6^{F}
Nethmi Ahinsa (SRI) | 0
Kwon Young-jin (KOR) | 0
Manisha Bhanwala (IND) | 8^{F}
Batkhuyagiin Khulan (MGL) | 5
Akari Fujinami (JPN) | 16
Son Il-sim (PRK) | 7
Nguyễn Thị Mỹ Trang (VIE) | 0

1/4 finals
Nilufar Raimova (KAZ) | 18
Laylokhon Sobirova (UZB) | 5
Liao Pei-ying (TPE) | 0
Hong Kexin (CHN) | 10
Manisha Bhanwala (IND) | 0
Akari Fujinami (JPN) | 3
Son Il-sim (PRK) | 2^{F}
Siwangi Dube (NEP) | 0

Semifinals
Nilufar Raimova (KAZ) | 0
Hong Kexin (CHN) | 10
Akari Fujinami (JPN) | 0
Son Il-sim (PRK) | 10^{F}

Final
Hong Kexin (CHN) | 7
Son Il-sim (PRK) | 2

=== Repechage ===
Repechage
Nethmi Ahinsa (SRI) | 5^{F}
Liao Pei-ying (TPE) | 2
Nguyễn Thị Mỹ Trang (VIE) | 4^{F}
Siwangi Dube (NEP) | 0

Bronze medal matches
Nethmi Ahinsa (SRI) | 1
Nilufar Raimova (KAZ) | 13
Nguyễn Thị Mỹ Trang (VIE) | 0
Akari Fujinami (JPN) | 10^{F}

== Final standing ==
| Rank | Athlete |
|---|---|
| 1st place, gold medalist(s) | Hong Kexin (CHN) |
| 2nd place, silver medalist(s) | Son Il-sim (PRK) |
| 3rd place, bronze medalist(s) | Nilufar Raimova (KAZ) |
| 3rd place, bronze medalist(s) | Akari Fujinami (JPN) |
| 5 | Nethmi Ahinsa (SRI) |
| 5 | Nguyễn Thị Mỹ Trang (VIE) |
| 7 | Manisha Bhanwala (IND) |
| 8 | Laylokhon Sobirova (UZB) |
| 9 | Liao Pei-ying (TPE) |
| 10 | Batkhuyagiin Khulan (MGL) |
| 11 | Siwangi Dube (NEP) |
| 12 | Kwon Young-jin (KOR) |
| 13 | Mutoharoh (INA) |
| 14 | Miriam Grace Balisme (PHI) |
