= 2026 World Wrestling Championships – Women's freestyle 72 kg =

Wrestling competitions

Women's freestyle 72 kg at the 2026 World Championships
- Venue: Barys Arena
- Dates: 28–29 October 2026
- Competitors: 15 from 15 nations

Medalists
gold medal	Li Zelu	China
silver medal	Wiktoria Chołuj	Poland
bronze medal	Tanu Sharma	India
bronze medal	Mahiro Yoshitake	Japan

The women's freestyle 72 kilograms is a competition featured at the 2026 World Wrestling Championships, and was held in Barys Arena, Astana, Kazakhstan on 28 and 29 October 2026. It is the second World Wrestling Championships hosted by Kazakhstan after the 2019 World Wrestling Championships were held in Astana.

The qualification rounds were held on 28 October while medal matches were held on the 2nd day of the competition. A total of 15 wrestlers competed in this event, limited to athletes weighing less than 72 kilograms.

This freestyle wrestling competition consists of a single-elimination tournament, with a repechage used to determine the winner of two bronze medals. The two finalists face off for gold and silver medals. Each wrestler who loses to one of the two finalists moves into the repechage, culminating in a pair of bronze medal matches, featuring the semifinal losers each facing the remaining repechage opponent from their half of the bracket.

Alla Belinska from Ukraine was the defending champion but didn't participate to defend her title. Li Zelu of China won the gold medal after beating Wiktoria Chołuj from Poland 4–3 in the gold medal match. Tanu Sharma from India and Mahiro Yoshitake from Japan shared the bronze medals.

== Results ==
Legend

- F — Won by fall

=== Main bracket ===
Round of 16
Precious Wieser (USA)	9
Buse Tosun Çavuşoğlu (TUR)	4
Alexandra Anghel (ROU)	0
Zaineb Sghaier (TUN)	9
Tanu Sharma (IND)	2
Wiktoria Chołuj (POL)	12
Li Zelu (CHN)	6^{F}
Ksenia Burakova (RUS)	0
Mahiro Yoshitake (JPN)	9^{F}
Zorigtyn Bolortungalag (MGL)	0
Zsuzsanna Molnár (SVK)	0
Nadiia Sokolovska (UKR)	10
Emilia Creciun (MDA)	2
Zhamila Bakbergenova (KAZ)	13

Quarterfinals
Nurzat Nurtaeva (KGZ)	2
Precious Wieser (USA)	3
Zaineb Sghaier (TUN)	0
Wiktoria Chołuj (POL)	9^{F}
Li Zelu (CHN)	9
Mahiro Yoshitake (JPN)	4
Nadiia Sokolovska (UKR)	1
Zhamila Bakbergenova (KAZ)	9

Semifinals
Precious Wieser (USA)	0
Wiktoria Chołuj (POL)	11^{F}
Li Zelu (CHN)	4
Zhamila Bakbergenova (KAZ)	2

Final
Wiktoria Chołuj (POL)	3
Li Zelu (CHN)	4

=== Repechage ===
Repechage round 1
Tanu Sharma (IND)	5
Zaineb Sghaier (TUN)	4
Ksenia Burakova (RUS)	1
Mahiro Yoshitake (JPN)	4

Bronze medals
Tanu Sharma (IND)	9
Precious Wieser (USA)	5
Mahiro Yoshitake (JPN)	6
Zhamila Bakbergenova (KAZ)	4

== Final standing ==
Rank	Athlete
1st place, gold medalist(s)	Li Zelu (CHN)
2nd place, silver medalist(s)	Wiktoria Chołuj (POL)
3rd place, bronze medalist(s)	Tanu Sharma (IND)
3rd place, bronze medalist(s)	Mahiro Yoshitake (JPN)
5	Precious Wieser (USA)
5	Zhamila Bakbergenova (KAZ)
7	Nadiia Sokolovska (UKR)
8	Zaineb Sghaier (TUN)
9	Buse Tosun Çavuşoğlu (TUR)
10	Nurzat Nurtaeva (KGZ)
11	Emilia Creciun (MDA)
12	Ksenia Burakova (RUS)
13	Alexandra Anghel (ROU)
14	Zorigtyn Bolortungalag (MGL)
15	Zsuzsanna Molnár (SVK)
