= 2026 World Wrestling Championships – Women's freestyle 59 kg =

Women's freestyle 59 kg at the 2026 World Championships
- Venue: Barys Arena
- Dates: 29–30 October 2026
- Competitors: 18 from 18 nations

Medalists
gold medal	Manisha Bhanwala	India
silver medal	Abigail Nette	United States
bronze medal	Mariia Vynnyk	Ukraine
bronze medal	Khürelkhüügiin Bolortuyaa	Mongolia

The women's freestyle 59 kilograms is a competition featured at the 2026 World Wrestling Championships, and was held in Astana, Kazakhstan on 29 and 30 October 2026.

This freestyle wrestling competition consists of a single-elimination tournament, with a repechage used to determine the winner of two bronze medals. The two finalists face off for gold and silver medals. Each wrestler who loses to one of the two finalists moves into the repechage, culminating in a pair of bronze medal matches, featuring the semifinal losers each facing the remaining repechage opponent from their half of the bracket.

== Results ==
Legend

- F — Won by fall

=== Final ===
Final
Abigail Nette (USA)	6
Manisha Bhanwala (IND)	8

=== Top half ===
Round of 32
Natsuki Yamaguchi (JPN)	0
Ruzanna Mammadova (AZE)	5

Round of 16
Mariia Vynnyk (UKR)	6
Erika Bognár (HUN)	2
Ruzanna Mammadova (AZE)	5
Xie Mengyu (CHN)	8
Svetlana Lipatova (RUS)	2
Paula Montoya (COL)	1
Gloria Niyonkuru (BDI)	0
Abigail Nette (USA)	12^{F}

Quarterfinals
Mariia Vynnyk (UKR)	10
Xie Mengyu (CHN)	3
Svetlana Lipatova (RUS)	6
Abigail Nette (USA)	7

Semifinals
Mariia Vynnyk (UKR)	0
Abigail Nette (USA)	6^{F}

=== Bottom half ===
Round of 32
Lydia Pérez (ESP)	12
Esther Asaolu (NGR)	1

Round of 16
Bediha Gün (TUR)	1
Altyn Shagayeva (KAZ)	3
Sarbinaz Jienbaeva (UZB)	2
Jowita Wrzesień (POL)	3
Khürelkhüügiin Bolortuyaa (MGL)	3
Lydia Pérez (ESP)	0
Manisha Bhanwala (IND)	6^{F}
Laurence Beauregard (CAN)	2

Quarterfinals
Altyn Shagayeva (KAZ)	5
Jowita Wrzesień (POL)	1
Khürelkhüügiin Bolortuyaa (MGL)	0
Manisha Bhanwala (IND)	6

Semifinals
Altyn Shagayeva (KAZ)	0
Manisha Bhanwala (IND)	10^{F}

=== Repechage ===
Repechage round 2
Gloria Niyonkuru (BDI)	0
Svetlana Lipatova (RUS)	6^{F}
Laurence Beauregard (CAN)	5
Khürelkhüügiin Bolortuyaa (MGL)	8

Bronze medals
Svetlana Lipatova (RUS)	6
Mariia Vynnyk (UKR)	7
Khürelkhüügiin Bolortuyaa (MGL)	8^{F}
Altyn Shagayeva (KAZ)	0

== Final standing ==
Rank	Athlete
1st place, gold medalist(s)	Manisha Bhanwala (IND)
2nd place, silver medalist(s)	Abigail Nette (USA)
3rd place, bronze medalist(s)	Mariia Vynnyk (UKR)
3rd place, bronze medalist(s)	Khürelkhüügiin Bolortuyaa (MGL)
5	Svetlana Lipatova (RUS)
5	Altyn Shagayeva (KAZ)
7	Lydia Pérez (ESP)
8	Xie Mengyu (CHN)
9	Ruzanna Mammadova (AZE)
10	Jowita Wrzesień (POL)
11	Laurence Beauregard (CAN)
12	Sarbinaz Jienbaeva (UZB)
13	Erika Bognár (HUN)
14	Paula Montoya (COL)
15	Bediha Gün (TUR)
16	Esther Asaolu (NGR)
17	Natsuki Yamaguchi (JPN)
18	Gloria Niyonkuru (BDI)
