= Sena Nagamoto =

Japanese freestyle wrestler (born 2000)

Personal information
- Native name: 永本 聖奈
- Born: 2 July 2000 (age 26) Yokkaichi, Mie, Japan

Sport
- Country: Japan
- Sport: Amateur wrestling
- Weight class: 57 kg 59 kg
- Event: Freestyle
Medal record
Women's freestyle wrestling
Representing Japan
World Championships
Silver medal – second place	2026 Astana	57 kg
Asian Championships
Silver medal – second place	2026 Bishkek	59 kg
U23 World Championships
Silver medal – second place	2023 Tirana	59 kg
U17 World Championships
Silver medal – second place	2017 Athens	56 kg

Sena Nagamoto (永本 聖奈, Nagamoto Sena; born 2 July 2000) is a Japanese freestyle wrestler. In 2026, she was a silver medalist in the 57 kg event at the World Championships and in the 59 kg event at the Asian Championships.

== Career ==
=== Early career ===
Nagamoto began wrestling at the age of 3, at the Yokkaichi Junior Wrestling Club. She won multiple national championships while in elementary school. In her third year at Hazu Junior High School, she finished in second place at the Junior Queens Cup Junior High School Division and third place at the National Junior High School Championships and the National Junior High School Selection Championships. In her second year at Shigakukan High School, she won the Junior Queens Cup Cadet Division, as well as winning a silver medal at the Inter-High School Championships and the World Cadet Championships. In her third year, she won the Asian Junior Championships, as well as finishing in second place in the Inter-High School Championships and third in the All Japan Championships and the All Japan Selection Championships.

=== University ===
Nagamoto enrolled at Shigakkan University in 2019, where she won the All Japan Student Championships and finished in third place at the All Japan Championships. During her time as a university student, she often finished in second and third place.

=== 2023–present ===
In 2023, Nagamoto joined Aisin and won the 59 kg event at the All Japan Selection Championshps, after which she lost to Sae Nanjo in the playoff to determine the representative at the World Championships. At the U23 World Championships in Tirana, she won a silver medal, in which she lost to Solomiia Vynnyk in the final.

In December 2025, Nagamoto won the All Japan Championships. In February 2026, she won the Zagreb Open. In April 2026, Nagamoto competed at the Asian Championships in Bishkek, where she won a silver medal after losing to Xie Mengyu in the final. In October 2026, she competed at the World Wrestling Championships in Astana, where she won a silver medal after losing to Hong Kexin in the final.
