= Wrestling at the 2026 Asian Games – Men's Greco-Roman 97 kg =

Men's Greco-Roman 97 kg at the 2026 Asian Games
- Venue: Inae Sports Center
- Date: 1 October 2026
- Competitors: 11 from 11 nations

Medalists
gold medal	Yuri Nakazato	Japan
silver medal	Nitesh Siwach	India
bronze medal	Ganbaataryn Gankhuyag	Mongolia
bronze medal	Mehdi Bali	Iran

The men's Greco-Roman 97 kilograms wrestling competition at the 2026 Asian Games in Nagoya was held on 1 October 2026 at the Inae Sports Center.

This Greco-Roman wrestling competition consists of a single-elimination tournament, with a repechage used to determine the winner of two bronze medals. The two finalists face off for gold and silver medals. Each wrestler who loses to one of the two finalists moves into the repechage, culminating in a pair of bronze medal matches featuring the semifinal losers each facing the remaining repechage opponent from their half of the bracket.

== Schedule ==
All times are Japan Standard Time (UTC+09:00)

Date	Time	Event
Thursday, 1 October 2026	10:30	1/8 finals
Thursday, 1 October 2026	10:30	1/4 finals
Thursday, 1 October 2026	10:30	Semifinals
Thursday, 1 October 2026	18:00	Finals

== Results ==
Legend

- F — Won by fall

=== Main bracket ===
1/8 finals
Amirkhon Berdikulov (UZB)	7
Lee Min-ho (KOR)	12
Ibrahim Fallatah (KSA)	0
Mehdi Bali (IRI)	7
Islam Yevloyev (KAZ)	11
Wang Zegang (CHN)	8

1/4 finals
Ganbaataryn Gankhuyag (MGL)	3
Lee Min-ho (KOR)	2
Nitesh Siwach (IND)	7
Amanberdi Agamämmedow (TKM)	1
Uzur Dzhuzupbekov (KGZ)	0
Mehdi Bali (IRI)	10
Islam Yevloyev (KAZ)	0
Yuri Nakazato (JPN)	10

Semifinals
Ganbaataryn Gankhuyag (MGL)	0
Nitesh Siwach (IND)	9
Mehdi Bali (IRI)	4
Yuri Nakazato (JPN)	5

Final
Nitesh Siwach (IND)	0
Yuri Nakazato (JPN)	4

=== Repechage ===
Bronze medal matches
Amanberdi Agamämmedow (TKM)	5
Ganbaataryn Gankhuyag (MGL)	9
Islam Yevloyev (KAZ)	1
Mehdi Bali (IRI)	5^{F}

== Final standing ==
Rank	Athlete
1st place, gold medalist(s)	Yuri Nakazato (JPN)
2nd place, silver medalist(s)	Nitesh Siwach (IND)
3rd place, bronze medalist(s)	Ganbaataryn Gankhuyag (MGL)
3rd place, bronze medalist(s)	Mehdi Bali (IRI)
5	Amanberdi Agamämmedow (TKM)
5	Islam Yevloyev (KAZ)
7	Lee Min-ho (KOR)
8	Wang Zegang (CHN)
9	Amirkhon Berdikulov (UZB)
10	Ibrahim Fallatah (KSA)
11	Uzur Dzhuzupbekov (KGZ)
