= 2022 U23 World Wrestling Championships – Men's Greco-Roman 97 kg =

Wrestling competitions

Men's Greco-Roman 97 kg at the 2022 U23 World Championships
- Venue: Pontevedra Municipal Sports Hall
- Dates: 18–19 October
- Competitors: 22 from 22 nations

Medalists
gold medal	Alex Szőke	Hungary
silver medal	Markus Ragginger	Austria
bronze medal	Ali Abedi	Iran
bronze medal	Nitesh Siwach	India

The men's Greco-Roman 97 kilograms is a competition featured at the 2022 U23 World Wrestling Championships, and was held in Pontevedra, Spain on 18 and 19 October 2022. The qualification rounds were held on 18 October while medal matches were held on the 2nd day of the competition. A total of 22 wrestlers competed in this event, limited to athletes whose body weight was less than 97 kilograms.

This Greco-Roman wrestling competition consists of a single-elimination tournament, with a repechage used to determine the winner of two bronze medals. The two finalists face off for gold and silver medals. Each wrestler who loses to one of the two finalists moves into the repechage, culminating in a pair of bronze medal matches featuring the semifinal losers each facing the remaining repechage opponent from their half of the bracket.

== Results ==
Legend

- F — Won by fall

=== Final ===
Final
Markus Ragginger (AUT)	2
Alex Szőke (HUN)	3

=== Top half ===
Round of 32
Ionuţ Goşa (ROU)	3
Ali Abedi (IRI)	4
Giorgi Katsanashvili (GEO)	3
Richard Karelson (EST)	1
Yuri Nakazato (JPN)	3
Anton Vieweg (GER)	0^{R}

Round of 16
Hayk Khloyan (ARM)	3
Mustafa Olgun (TUR)	6
Ali Abedi (IRI)	0
Markus Ragginger (AUT)	8
Aýbegşazada Kürräýew (TKM)	0
Giorgi Katsanashvili (GEO)	9
Yuri Nakazato (JPN)	5
Islam Umayev (KAZ)	0

Quarterfinals
Mustafa Olgun (TUR)	3
Markus Ragginger (AUT)	6
Giorgi Katsanashvili (GEO)	5
Yuri Nakazato (JPN)	1

Semifinals
Markus Ragginger (AUT)	4
Giorgi Katsanashvili (GEO)	1

=== Bottom half ===
Round of 32
José Ferrándiz (ESP)	2
Nitesh Siwach (IND)	10
Alex Szőke (HUN)	9
Nicholas Boykin (USA)	0
Tyrone Sterkenburg (NED)	2
Igor Queiroz (BRA)	7

Round of 16
Sami Samra (EGY)	5
Nitesh Siwach (IND)	10
Alex Szőke (HUN)	9
Luka Katić (SRB)	0
Apostolos Nikolakopoulos (GRE)	1
Igor Queiroz (BRA)	3
Mindaugas Venckaitis (LTU)	1
Valentyn Shkliarenko (UKR)	1

Quarterfinals
Nitesh Siwach (IND)	0
Alex Szőke (HUN)	8
Igor Queiroz (BRA)	5
Valentyn Shkliarenko (UKR)	3

Semifinals
Alex Szőke (HUN)	3
Igor Queiroz (BRA)	0

=== Repechage ===
Repechage round 1
Nicholas Boykin (USA)	4
Luka Katić (SRB)	7

Repechage round 2
Ali Abedi (IRI)	6
Mustafa Olgun (TUR)	3
Luka Katić (SRB)	4
Nitesh Siwach (IND)	13

Bronze medals
Ali Abedi (IRI)	1
Giorgi Katsanashvili (GEO)	1
Nitesh Siwach (IND)	10
Igor Queiroz (BRA)	0

== Final standing ==
Rank	Athlete
1st place, gold medalist(s)	Alex Szőke (HUN)
2nd place, silver medalist(s)	Markus Ragginger (AUT)
3rd place, bronze medalist(s)	Ali Abedidarzi (IRI)
3rd place, bronze medalist(s)	Nitesh Siwach (IND)
5	Giorgi Katsanashvili (GEO)
5	Igor Queiroz (BRA)
7	Yuri Nakazato (JPN)
8	Mustafa Olgun (TUR)
9	Luka Katić (SRB)
10	Valentyn Shkliarenko (UKR)
11	Sami Samra (EGY)
12	Nicholas Boykin (USA)
13	Ionuţ Goşa (ROU)
14	Hayk Khloyan (ARM)
15	Tyrone Sterkenburg (NED)
16	José Ferrándiz (ESP)
17	Mindaugas Venckaitis (LTU)
18	Richard Karelson (EST)
19	Apostolos Nikolakopoulos (GRE)
20	Anton Vieweg (GER)
21	Islam Umayev (KAZ)
22	Aýbegşazada Kürräýew (TKM)
