= Igor Queiroz =

Brazilian Greco-Roman wrestler

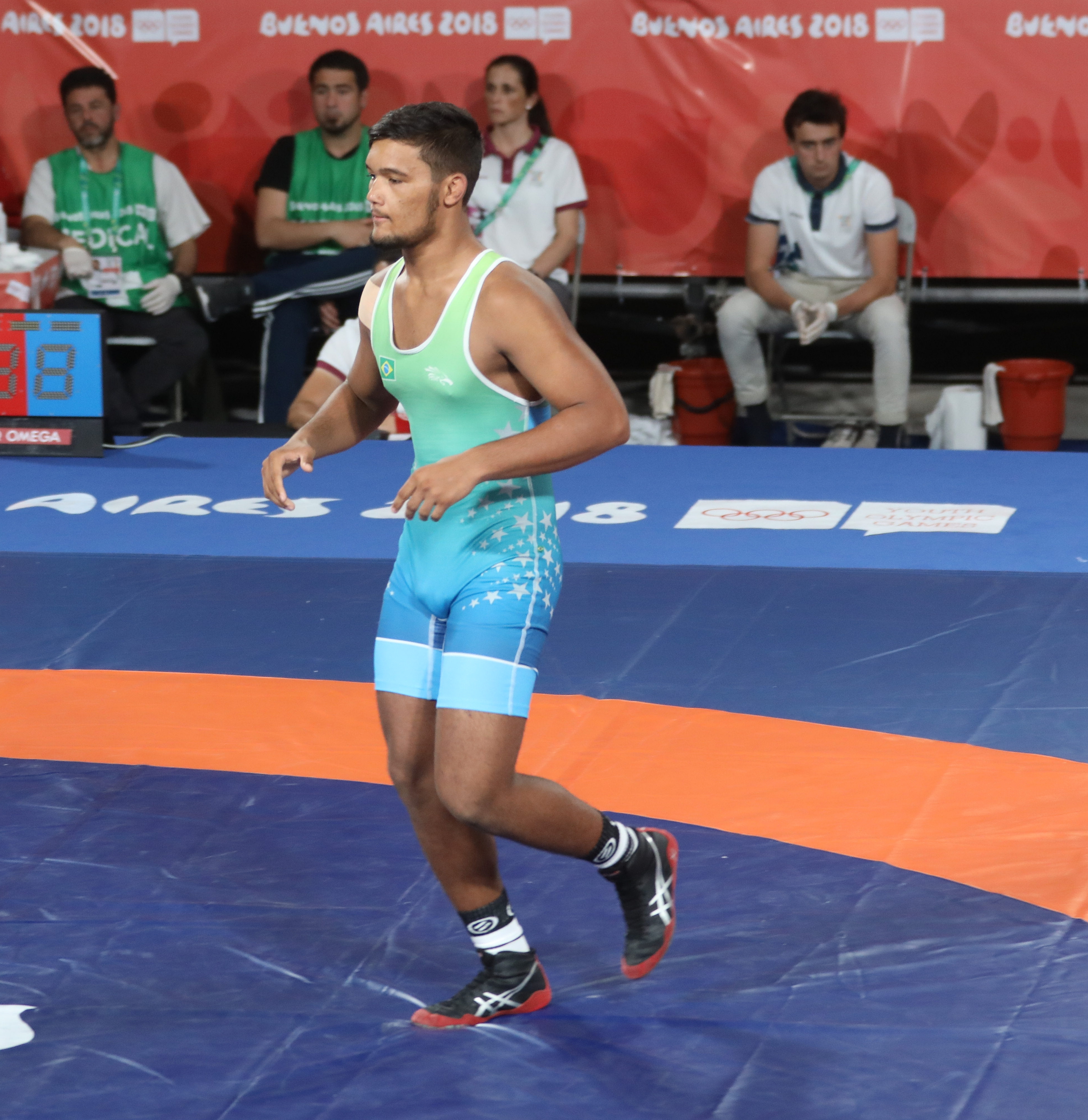
- Queiroz at the 2018 Summer Youth Olympics

Personal information
- Full name: Igor Fernando Alvez de Queiroz
- Born: 24 October 2001 (age 24) Cuiabá, Mato Grosso, Brazil
- Height: 186 cm (6 ft 1 in)
- Weight: 95 kg (209 lb)

Sport
- Country: Brazil
- Sport: Amateur wrestling
- Event: Greco-Roman
Medal record
Men's Greco-Roman wrestling
Representing Brazil
Pan American Games
Bronze medal – third place	2023 Santiago	97 kg
Pan American Championships
Bronze medal – third place	2021 Guatemala	97 kg
Bronze medal – third place	2023 Buenos Aires	97 kg
South American Games
Silver medal – second place	2022 Asunción	97 kg
Junior Pan American Games
Gold medal – first place	2021 Cali	97 kg

Igor Fernando Alvez de Queiroz (born 24 October 2001) is a Brazilian Greco-Roman wrestler.

== Career ==
Queiroz was at the 2018 Summer Youth Olympics held in Buenos Aires, Argentina, finishing in 5th place in the Boys' Greco-Roman 92 kg category.

At the 2021 Pan American Wrestling Championships held in Guatemala City, he won a bronze medal in the 97 kg category.

A month after winning bronze in the adult Pan American Wrestling Championships, Queiroz was champion of the 2021 Junior Pan American Games. As a result, he directly qualified to compete in the 97 kg event at the 2023 Pan American Games in Santiago, Chile.

Queiroz made his World Championship debut at the 2022 World Wrestling Championships, facing Turkish Metehan Basar. He started ahead, but suffered a 1–1 draw in the first round. The Turk scored again and Igor continued in search of the point that would give him a draw and victory. But Basar prevented the Brazilian's attempts and won 2–1. In the next round, Basar was beaten 3-1 by the Armenian Artur Aleksanian and prevented Igor from returning to the repechage.

At the 2022 South American Games, he won a silver medal in the 97 kg category.

At the 2022 U23 World Wrestling Championships, Queiroz reached the semifinals, but was defeated twice in a row, and finished fifth in the Greco-Roman style up to 97 kg category, achieving Brazil's best result in this style considering all the World Championships.

At the 2023 Pan American Wrestling Championships held in Buenos Aires, Argentina, Queiroz won a bronze medal in the 97 kg category. The Brazilian, who had won the bronze medal in 2021, won the second senior class medal of his career.

At the 2023 World Wrestling Championships, Queiroz, number 30 in the world ranking, debuted against world runner-up Rustam Assakalov and ended up being eliminated in the first round.

At the 2023 Pan American Games, he won a bronze medal in the Men's Greco-Roman 97 kg category.
