= Li Zelu =

Chinese freestyle wrestler

Personal information
- Native name: 李泽露
- Born: 1 January 2001 (age 25) Qiubei County, Yunnan, China
- Height: 1.70 m (5 ft 7 in)
- Weight: 68 kg (150 lb; 10.7 st)

Sport
- Country: China
- Sport: Freestyle
- Event: 68 kg
Medal record
Women's freestyle wrestling
Representing China
World Championships
Gold medal – first place	2026 Astana	72 kg
Bronze medal – third place	2025 Zagreb	72 kg
Asian Championships
Gold medal – first place	2025 Amman	68 kg
Bronze medal – third place	2026 Bishkek	68 kg
Grand Prix
Silver medal – second place	2025 Tirana	68 kg

Li Zelu (Chinese: 李 泽露, born 2001) is a Chinese freestyle wrestler competing in the 68 kg division. She won the gold medal at the 2025 Asian Wrestling Championships.

== Career ==
In the 2025 Asian Wrestling Championships held in Amman, Jordan, after bye in the first round, she reached the final by defeating Kazakh Irina Kazyulina in the quarterfinals with a 4–0 lead and Indian Mansi Lather 8–1 in the semifinals. In the final match, she won the gold medal against North Korean Pak Sol-gum by pinning her opponent while leading 4–0.
