= Wiktoria Chołuj =

Polish freestyle wrestler

Personal information
- Born: 14 February 2000 (age 26) Białogard, Poland
- Height: 1.70 m (5 ft 7 in)
- Weight: 72 kg (159 lb)

Sport
- Country: Poland
- Sport: Women's freestyle wrestling
- Event: 72 kg
Medal record
Women's freestyle wrestling
Representing Poland
World Championships
Silver medal – second place	2026 Astana	72 kg
European Championships
Bronze medal – third place	2024 Bucharest	72 kg
Grand Prix
Bronze medal – third place	2022 Rome	68 kg
World U23 Championships
Silver medal – second place	2022 Pontevedra	72 kg
World Juniors Championships
Bronze medal – third place	2019 Tallinn	65 kg
World Cadets Championships
Bronze medal – third place	2017 Athens	70 kg
European U23 Championship
Gold medal – first place	2021 Skopje	72 kg
Gold medal – first place	2022 Plovdiv	72 kg
Gold medal – first place	2023 Bucharest	72 kg
European Juniors Championships
Gold medal – first place	2019 Pontevedra	65 kg

Wiktoria Chołuj (born 14 February 2000) is a Polish freestyle wrestler competing in the 72 kg division. She competed in the 2024 Paris Olympics, losing in the second round to Amit Elor of the United States (8-0).

== Career ==
In 2023, she competed in the women's 68 kg event at the 2023 World Wrestling Championships held in Belgrade, Serbia, and in the U23 championships won the silver medal, behind American gold medal winner Amit Elor.

In 2024, she won one of the bronze medals in the women's freestyle 72 kg event at the European Wrestling Championships held in Bucharest, Romania. She competed at the 2024 European Wrestling Olympic Qualification Tournament in Baku, Azerbaijan and she earned a quota place for Poland for the 2024 Summer Olympics in Paris, France.

She competed in the 2024 Paris Olympics, losing in the second round to Amit Elor of the United States (8-0).

== Achievements ==
Year	Tournament	Location	Result	Event
2024	European Championships	Bucharest, Romania	3rd	Freestyle 72 kg
2026	World Championships	Astana, Kazakhstan	2nd	Freestyle 72 kg
