= 2023 U23 World Wrestling Championships – Women's freestyle 59 kg =

Wrestling competitions

Women's freestyle 59 kg at the 2023 U23 World Championships
- Venue: Tirana Olympic Park
- Dates: 25–26 October
- Competitors: 16 from 13 nations

Medalists
gold medal	Solomiia Vynnyk	Ukraine
silver medal	Sena Nagamoto	Japan
bronze medal	Nitika Kataria
bronze medal	Anastasiia Sidelnikova	Authorised Neutral Athletes

The women's freestyle 59 kilograms is a competition featured at the 2023 U23 World Wrestling Championships, and will held in Tirana, Albania on 25 and 26 October 2023.

This freestyle wrestling competition consists of a single-elimination tournament, with a repechage used to determine the winner of two bronze medals. The two finalists face off for gold and silver medals. Each wrestler who loses to one of the two finalists moves into the repechage, culminating in a pair of bronze medal matches featuring the semifinal losers each facing the remaining repechage opponent from their half of the bracket.

== Results ==
Legend

- F — Won by fall

=== Main bracket ===
Round of 16
Kalmira Bilimbek Kyzy (KGZ)	13
Guldana Bekesh (KAZ)	2
Solomiia Vynnyk (UKR)	10
Nitika Kataria (UWW)	0
Wiktoria Karwowska (POL)	0
Nichole Moore (USA)	9
Michaela Rankin (CAN)	11
Karoline Ortiz (PUR)	6
Ramina Mamedova (LAT)	8^{F}
Ana Maria Puiu (ROU)	0
Nadzeya Bulanaya (ANA)	2
Sena Nagamoto (JPN)	12
Kelsey Barnes (GBR)	0
Amel Rebiha (FRA)	10
Ebru Dağbaşı (TUR)	3
Anastasiia Sidelnikova (ANA)	7

Quarterfinals
Kalmira Bilimbek Kyzy (KGZ)	5
Solomiia Vynnyk (UKR)	11
Nichole Moore (USA)	0
Michaela Rankin (CAN)	7
Ramina Mamedova (LAT)	0
Sena Nagamoto (JPN)	10
Amel Rebiha (FRA)	2
Anastasiia Sidelnikova (ANA)	12

Semifinals
Solomiia Vynnyk (UKR)	10
Michaela Rankin (CAN)	0
Sena Nagamoto (JPN)	5
Anastasiia Sidelnikova (ANA)	2

Final
Solomiia Vynnyk (UKR)	1
Sena Nagamoto (JPN)	1

=== Repechage ===
Repechage round 1
Nitika Kataria (UWW)	5^{F}
Kalmira Bilimbek Kyzy (KGZ)	8
Nadzeya Bulanaya (ANA)	6
Ramina Mamedova (LAT)	1

Bronze medals
Nitika Kataria (UWW)	5^{F}
Michaela Rankin (CAN)	0
Nadzeya Bulanaya (ANA)	3
Anastasiia Sidelnikova (ANA)	6
