= Wrestling at the 2023 Pan American Games – Men's Greco-Roman 97 kg =

Men's Greco-Roman 97 at the 2023 Pan American Games
- Venue: Olympic Training Center in Ñuñoa
- Dates: November 4
- Competitors: 9 from 9 nations

Medalists
Gold medal	Gabriel Rosillo	Cuba
Silver medal	Luillys Pérez	Venezuela
Bronze medal	Kevin Mejía	Honduras
Bronze medal	Igor Queiroz	Brazil

The men's Greco-Roman 97 kg competition of the Wrestling events at the 2023 Pan American Games in Ñuñoa was held on November 4.

== Qualification ==
The winner of each weight category at the 2021 Junior Pan American Games in Cali, Colombia qualified directly, along with the top four at the 2022 Pan American Wrestling Championships and 2023 Pan American Wrestling Championships. The host country (Chile) is guaranteed a spot in each event, but its athletes must compete in both the 2022 and 2023 Pan American Championship. If Chile does not qualify at any of the first two events, it will take the fourth spot available at the 2023 Pan American Championships. A further six wildcards (four men and two women) will be awarded to nations without any qualified athlete but took part in the qualification tournaments.

== Schedule ==
All times are local (UTC−3)

Date	Time	Event
Wednesday, 4 November 2023	10:00	Round of 16
Wednesday, 4 November 2023	11:00	Quarterfinals
Wednesday, 4 November 2023	12:00	Semifinals
Wednesday, 4 November 2023	12:00	Repechage
Wednesday, 4 November 2023	17:00	Finals

== Results ==
Legend

- F — Won by fall

=== Main Bracket ===
Round of 16
Kevin Mejía (HON)	7
Gabriel Rosillo (CUB)	9

Quarterfinals
Carlos Adames (DOM)	0
Gabriel Rosillo (CUB)	9
Joe Rau (USA)	9
José Jourdan (PUR)	0
Luillys Pérez (VEN)	8
Igor Queiroz (BRA)	5
Max Madrid (PAN)	1
Ricardo Gómez (ARG)	3

Semifinals
Gabriel Rosillo (CUB)	8
Joe Rau (USA)	0
Luillys Pérez (VEN)	8
Ricardo Gómez (ARG)	0

Finals
Gabriel Rosillo (CUB)	9
Luillys Pérez (VEN)	1

=== Repechage ===
Repechage round 1
Kevin Mejía (HON)	8
Carlos Adames (DOM)	0

Bronze medal match
Kevin Mejía (HON)	7
Joe Rau (USA)	2
Igor Queiroz (BRA)	7
Ricardo Gómez (ARG)	0

== Final standing ==
Rank	Athlete
1st place, gold medalist(s)	Gabriel Rosillo (CUB)
2nd place, silver medalist(s)	Luillys Pérez (VEN)
3rd place, bronze medalist(s)	Kevin Mejía (HON)
3rd place, bronze medalist(s)	Igor Queiroz (BRA)
5	Joe Rau (USA)
5	Ricardo Gómez (ARG)
7	Max Madrid (PAN)
8	José Jourdan (PUR)
9	Carlos Adames (DOM)
