= 2023 U23 World Wrestling Championships – Women's freestyle 57 kg =

Wrestling competitions

Women's freestyle 57 kg at the 2023 U23 World Championships
- Venue: Tirana Olympic Park
- Dates: 26–27 October
- Competitors: 13 from 10 nations

Medalists
gold medal	Sara Natami	Japan
silver medal	Zhala Aliyeva	Azerbaijan
bronze medal	Elvira Kamaloğlu	Turkey
bronze medal	Reena Sangwan

The women's freestyle 57 kilograms is a competition featured at the 2023 U23 World Wrestling Championships, and will held in Tirana, Albania on 26 and 27 October 2023.

This freestyle wrestling competition consists of a single-elimination tournament, with a repechage used to determine the winner of two bronze medals. The two finalists face off for gold and silver medals. Each wrestler who loses to one of the two finalists moves into the repechage, culminating in a pair of bronze medal matches featuring the semifinal losers each facing the remaining repechage opponent from their half of the bracket.

== Results ==
Legend

- F — Won by fall

=== Main Bracket ===
Round of 16
Bermet Nuridin Kyzy (KGZ)	0
Elvira Kamaloğlu (TUR)	13
Alina Filipovych (UKR)	14
Anna Michalcová (CZE)	4
Sara Natami (JPN)	10^{F}
Xochitl Mota-Pettis (USA)	2
Reena Sangwan (UWW)	2
Zhala Aliyeva (AZE)	2^{F}
Angelika Mytkowska (POL)	0
Shugyla Omirbek (KAZ)	10

Quarterfinals
Alesia Hetmanava (ANA)	1
Elvira Kamaloğlu (TUR)	3^{F}
Alina Filipovych (UKR)	0
Sara Natami (JPN)	7^{F}
Mariia Buzarova (ANA)	0
Zhala Aliyeva (AZE)	2^{F}
Shugyla Omirbek (KAZ)	4
Mia Friesen (CAN)	9

Semifinals
Elvira Kamaloğlu (TUR)	1
Sara Natami (JPN)	8
Zhala Aliyeva (AZE)	10
Mia Friesen (CAN)	0

Final
Sara Natami (JPN)	18
Zhala Aliyeva (AZE)	8

=== Repechage ===
Repechage round 1
Xochitl Mota-Pettis (USA)	2^{F}
Alina Filipovych (UKR)	4
Reena Sangwan (UWW)	10
Mariia Buzarova (ANA)	0

Bronze medals
Xochitl Mota-Pettis (USA)	3
Elvira Kamaloğlu (TUR)	4
Reena Sangwan (UWW)	8
Mia Friesen (CAN)	2
