= Mun Hyon-gyong =

North Korean freestyle wrestler

Personal information
- Native name: 문현경
- Born: 28 February 1998 (age 28)
- Height: 156 cm (5 ft 1 in)

Sport
- Country: North Korea
- Sport: Amateur wrestling
- Weight class: 62 kg
- Event: Freestyle
Medal record
Women's freestyle wrestling
Representing North Korea
Asian Championships
Silver medal – second place	2026 Bishkek	62 kg
Asian Games
Gold medal – first place	2022 Hangzhou	62 kg
Military World Games
Gold medal – first place	2019 Wuhan	62 kg

Mun Hyon-gyong (Korean: 문현경, born 28 February 1998) is a North Korean freestyle wrestler competing in the 62 kg weight category. She won the gold medal at the 2022 Asian Games and the 2019 Military World Games.

== Career ==
Mun became the Asian Games champion at the 2022 Asian Games in Hangzhou, winning the gold medal in the women's freestyle 62 kg event.

Earlier in her career, she won the gold medal at the 2019 Military World Games in Wuhan, China, also in the 62 kg category.

She finished fifth at the 2019 Asian Wrestling Championships.
