= 2026 Asian Wrestling Championships =

- Host city: Bishkek, Kyrgyzstan
- Dates: 6–12 April 2026
- Stadium: Zhashtyk Arena

Champions
- Freestyle: Iran
- Greco-Roman: Iran
- Women: China

The 2026 Asian Wrestling Championships is the 22nd edition of Asian Wrestling Championships of combined events, and took place from 6 to 12 April in Bishkek, Kyrgyzstan.

== Medal table ==
| Rank | Nation | Gold | Silver | Bronze | Total |
|---|---|---|---|---|---|
| 1 | Iran | 6 | 6 | 6 | 18 |
| 2 | Japan | 6 | 5 | 4 | 15 |
| 3 | China | 5 | 1 | 8 | 14 |
| 4 | Kyrgyzstan | 5 | 1 | 6 | 12 |
| 5 | India | 2 | 6 | 9 | 17 |
| 6 | Uzbekistan | 2 | 2 | 7 | 11 |
| 7 | Mongolia | 1 | 3 | 4 | 8 |
| 8 | North Korea | 1 | 3 | 0 | 4 |
| 9 | Kazakhstan | 1 | 0 | 6 | 7 |
| 10 | Qatar | 1 | 0 | 0 | 1 |
| 11 | Bahrain | 0 | 3 | 3 | 6 |
| 12 | South Korea | 0 | 0 | 4 | 4 |
| 13 | Tajikistan | 0 | 0 | 2 | 2 |
| 14 | Turkmenistan | 0 | 0 | 1 | 1 |
| Totals (14 entries) | | 30 | 30 | 60 | 120 |

== Team ranking ==
| Rank | Men's freestyle | | Men's Greco-Roman | | Women's freestyle | |
| Rank | Team | Points | Team | Points | Team | Points |
|---|---|---|---|---|---|---|
| 1 | Iran | 178 | Iran | 195 | China | 205 |
| 2 | India | 162 | Kyrgyzstan | 154 | Japan | 191 |
| 3 | Japan | 127 | Uzbekistan | 136 | Mongolia | 126 |
| 4 | Bahrain | 105 | India | 115 | Kyrgyzstan | 115 |
| 5 | Kyrgyzstan | 102 | Kazakhstan | 112 | India | 110 |
| 6 | Mongolia | 83 | China | 110 | Uzbekistan | 91 |
| 7 | Kazakhstan | 80 | Japan | 100 | South Korea | 79 |
| 8 | Uzbekistan | 78 | South Korea | 88 | Kazakhstan | 79 |
| 9 | Tajikistan | 66 | Turkmenistan | 42 | North Korea | 40 |
| 10 | China | 54 | Qatar | 29 | Chinese Taipei | 40 |

== Medal summary ==
=== Men's freestyle ===
| Event | Gold | Silver | Bronze |
|---|---|---|---|
| 57 kg | Milad Valizadeh; Iran | Batkhuyagiin Mönkh-Erdene; Mongolia | Abdymalik Karachov; Kyrgyzstan |
| 57 kg | Milad Valizadeh; Iran | Batkhuyagiin Mönkh-Erdene; Mongolia | Ankush Chandram; India |
| 61 kg | Kim Kwang-myong; North Korea | Aman Sehrawat; India | Ahmad Javan; Iran |
| 61 kg | Kim Kwang-myong; North Korea | Aman Sehrawat; India | Gulomjon Abdullaev; Uzbekistan |
| 65 kg | Sujeet Kalkal; India | Umidjon Jalolov; Uzbekistan | Abdulmazhid Kudiev; Tajikistan |
| 65 kg | Sujeet Kalkal; India | Umidjon Jalolov; Uzbekistan | Alibeg Alibegov; Bahrain |
| 70 kg | Abhimanyou Mandwal; India | Tömör-Ochiryn Tulga; Mongolia | Ernazar Akmataliev; Kyrgyzstan |
| 70 kg | Abhimanyou Mandwal; India | Tömör-Ochiryn Tulga; Mongolia | Sina Khalili; Iran |
| 74 kg | Yoshinosuke Aoyagi; Japan | Magomedrasul Asluev; Bahrain | Mustafo Akhmedov; Tajikistan |
| 74 kg | Yoshinosuke Aoyagi; Japan | Magomedrasul Asluev; Bahrain | Amir Mohammad Yazdani; Iran |
| 79 kg | Keyvan Gharehdaghi; Japan | Sandeep Singh Mann; India | Olonbayaryn Süldkhüü; Mongolia |
| 79 kg | Keyvan Gharehdaghi; Japan | Sandeep Singh Mann; India | Zhakshylyk Baitashov; Kyrgyzstan |
| 86 kg | Kamran Ghasempour; Iran | Mukul Dahiya; India | Alp Arslan Begenjow; Turkmenistan |
| 86 kg | Kamran Ghasempour; Iran | Mukul Dahiya; India | Khidir Saipudinov; Bahrain |
| 92 kg | Mohammad Mobin Azimi; Iran | Magomed Sharipov; Bahrain | Iakov Chaplin; Kyrgyzstan |
| 92 kg | Mohammad Mobin Azimi; Iran | Magomed Sharipov; Bahrain | Azamat Dauletbekov; Kazakhstan |
| 97 kg | Arash Yoshida; Japan | Amir Ali Azarpira; Iran | Sherzod Poyonov; Uzbekistan |
| 97 kg | Arash Yoshida; Japan | Amir Ali Azarpira; Iran | Akhmed Tazhudinov; Bahrain |
| 125 kg | Amir Hossein Zare; Iran | Shamil Sharipov; Bahrain | Yedige Kassimbek; Kazakhstan |
| 125 kg | Amir Hossein Zare; Iran | Shamil Sharipov; Bahrain | Dinesh Dhankhar; India |

=== Men's Greco-Roman ===
| Event | Gold | Silver | Bronze |
|---|---|---|---|
| 55 kg | Ikhtiyor Botirov; Uzbekistan | Lalit Sehrawat; India | Shi Huoying; China |
| 55 kg | Ikhtiyor Botirov; Uzbekistan | Lalit Sehrawat; India | Mohammad Hosseinvand; Iran |
| 60 kg | Alisher Ganiev; Uzbekistan | Ri Se-ung; North Korea | Yu Shiotani; Japan |
| 60 kg | Alisher Ganiev; Uzbekistan | Ri Se-ung; North Korea | Ali Ahmadi Vafa; Iran |
| 63 kg | Aftandil Taalaibek Uulu; Kyrgyzstan | Erfan Jarkani; Iran | Kaisei Tanabe; Japan |
| 63 kg | Aftandil Taalaibek Uulu; Kyrgyzstan | Erfan Jarkani; Iran | Choi Hyun-woong; South Korea |
| 67 kg | Razzak Beishekeev; Kyrgyzstan | Kensuke Shimizu; Japan | Ahmad Reza Mohsennejad; Iran |
| 67 kg | Razzak Beishekeev; Kyrgyzstan | Kensuke Shimizu; Japan | Sachin Sahrawat; India |
| 72 kg | Almatbek Amanbek; Kazakhstan | Mohammad Javad Rezaei; Iran | Li Dongyu; China |
| 72 kg | Almatbek Amanbek; Kazakhstan | Mohammad Javad Rezaei; Iran | Shakhzod Kuchkorov; Uzbekistan |
| 77 kg | Akzhol Makhmudov; Kyrgyzstan | Ali Oskou; Iran | Noh Yeong-hun; South Korea |
| 77 kg | Akzhol Makhmudov; Kyrgyzstan | Ali Oskou; Iran | Doniyorkhon Nakibov; Uzbekistan |
| 82 kg | Shahin Badaghi; Qatar | Mohammad Amin Hosseini; Iran | Ibragim Magomadov; Kazakhstan |
| 82 kg | Shahin Badaghi; Qatar | Mohammad Amin Hosseini; Iran | Prince; India |
| 87 kg | Asan Zhanyshov; Kyrgyzstan | Gholamreza Farrokhi; Iran | Nursultan Tursynov; Kazakhstan |
| 87 kg | Asan Zhanyshov; Kyrgyzstan | Gholamreza Farrokhi; Iran | Sunil Kumar; India |
| 97 kg | Mohammad Hadi Saravi; Iran | Nitesh Siwach; India | Islam Yevloyev; Kazakhstan |
| 97 kg | Mohammad Hadi Saravi; Iran | Nitesh Siwach; India | Wang Zegang; China |
| 130 kg | Amin Mirzazadeh; Iran | Rafael Tsitsuashvili; Uzbekistan | Kim Min-seok; South Korea |
| 130 kg | Amin Mirzazadeh; Iran | Rafael Tsitsuashvili; Uzbekistan | Jiang Wenhao; China |

=== Women's freestyle ===
| Event | Gold | Silver | Bronze |
|---|---|---|---|
| 50 kg | Yui Susaki; Japan | Kim Son-hyang; North Korea | Aktenge Keunimjaeva; Uzbekistan |
| 50 kg | Yui Susaki; Japan | Kim Son-hyang; North Korea | Feng Ziqi; China |
| 53 kg | Zhang Jin; China | Meenakshi Goyat; India | Moe Kiyooka; Japan |
| 53 kg | Zhang Jin; China | Meenakshi Goyat; India | Sakibjamal Esbosynova; Uzbekistan |
| 55 kg | Sowaka Uchida; Japan | Li Yuxuan; China | Odonchimegiin Ariunzayaa; Mongolia |
| 55 kg | Sowaka Uchida; Japan | Li Yuxuan; China | Hansika Lamba; India |
| 57 kg | Hong Kexin; China | Batkhuyagiin Khulan; Mongolia | Kwon Young-jin; South Korea |
| 57 kg | Hong Kexin; China | Batkhuyagiin Khulan; Mongolia | Sara Natami; Japan |
| 59 kg | Xie Mengyu; China | Sena Nagamoto; Japan | Neha Sangwan; India |
| 59 kg | Xie Mengyu; China | Sena Nagamoto; Japan | Ulmeken Esenbaeva; Uzbekistan |
| 62 kg | Nonoka Ozaki; Japan | Mun Hyon-gyong; North Korea | Zhang Qi; China |
| 62 kg | Nonoka Ozaki; Japan | Mun Hyon-gyong; North Korea | Sükheegiin Tserenchimed; Mongolia |
| 65 kg | Lili; China | Nana Ikehata; Japan | Gulnura Tashtanbekova; Kyrgyzstan |
| 65 kg | Lili; China | Nana Ikehata; Japan | Monika Sheoran; India |
| 68 kg | Meerim Zhumanazarova; Kyrgyzstan | Miwa Morikawa; Japan | Li Zelu; China |
| 68 kg | Meerim Zhumanazarova; Kyrgyzstan | Miwa Morikawa; Japan | Enkhsaikhany Delgermaa; Mongolia |
| 72 kg | Long Jia; China | Mahiro Yoshitake; Japan | Nurzat Nurtaeva; Kyrgyzstan |
| 72 kg | Long Jia; China | Mahiro Yoshitake; Japan | Harshita Mor; India |
| 76 kg | Enkh-Amaryn Davaanasan; Mongolia | Aiperi Medet Kyzy; Kyrgyzstan | Li Wenji; China |
| 76 kg | Enkh-Amaryn Davaanasan; Mongolia | Aiperi Medet Kyzy; Kyrgyzstan | Gulmaral Yerkebayeva; Kazakhstan |

== Participating nations ==
321 competitors from 21 nations competed.

- Bahrain (6)
- China (30)
- Chinese Taipei (8)
- India (30)
- Iran (20)
- Japan (29)
- Jordan (5)
- Kazakhstan (30)
- Kyrgyzstan (29)
- Mongolia (21)
- Nepal (2)
- North Korea (6)
- Qatar (4)
- Saudi Arabia (4)
- Singapore (1)
- South Korea (30)
- Sri Lanka (7)
- Tajikistan (12)
- Turkmenistan (13)
- Uzbekistan (30)
- Vietnam (4)
