= Batkhuyagiin Khulan =

Mongolian wrestler

Personal information
- Native name: Батхуягийн Хулан
- Nationality: Mongolia
- Born: 20 November 1999 (age 26) Baganuur, Mongolia

Sport
- Country: Mongolia
- Sport: Wrestling
- Weight class: 53 kg
- Event: Freestyle

Achievements and titles
- Olympic finals: 5th(2024)
- World finals: (silver) (2022)
- Regional finals: (silver) (2022)
Medal record
Women's freestyle wrestling
Representing Mongolia
World Championships
Silver medal – second place	2022 Belgrade	53 kg
Asian Championships
Silver medal – second place	2022 Ulaanbaatar	53 kg
Silver medal – second place	2026 Bishkek	57 kg
Kaba Uulu Kozhomkul & Raatbek Sanatbaev Tournament
Gold medal – first place	2023 Bishkek	53 kg
Golden Grand Prix Ivan Yarygin
Bronze medal – third place	2022 Krasnoyarsk	53 kg
Bronze medal – third place	2021 Krasnoyarsk	53 kg
Bronze medal – third place	2026 Krasnoyarsk	57 kg
Asian Cadets Championships
Silver medal – second place	2016 Taichung	52 kg

Batkhuyagiin Khulan (born 20 November 1999), is a Mongolian wrestler. She participated at the 2022 Asian Wrestling Championships, being awarded the silver medal in the women's freestyle 53 kg event.

In September 2022, Khulan competed at the 2022 World Wrestling Championships in the women's freestyle 53 kg event. She defeated Jonna Malmgren in the semi-final, but was defeated in the final by Dominique Parrish.

She competed at the 2024 Asian Wrestling Olympic Qualification Tournament in Bishkek, Kyrgyzstan hoping to qualify for the 2024 Summer Olympics in Paris, France. She was eliminated in her second match and she did not qualify for the Olympics. She also competed at the 2024 World Wrestling Olympic Qualification Tournament held in Istanbul, Turkey and she earned a quota place for Mongolia for the Olympics. She competed in the women's 53 kg event at the Olympics. She lost her bronze medal match against Pang Qianyu of China.
