= Manisha Bhanwala =

Indian freestyle wrestler (born 1997)

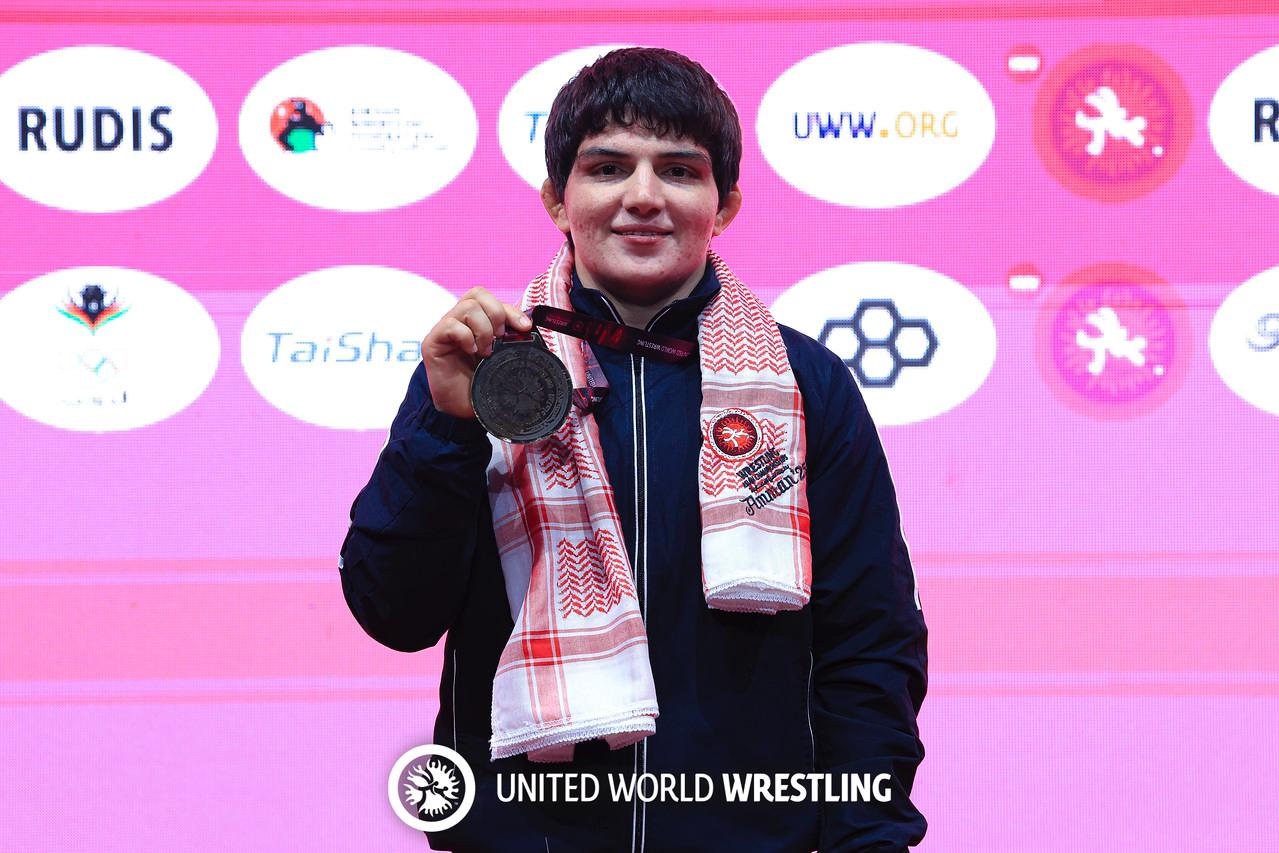
- Bhanwala at the 2025 Asian Championships

Personal information
- Born: 10 February 1997 (age 29) Rohtak, Haryana, India

Sport
- Sport: Wrestling
- Event: Freestyle
- Club: Inspire Institute of Sport
Medal record
Women's freestyle wrestling
Representing India
World Championships
Gold medal – first place	2026 Astana	59 kg
Asian Championships
Gold medal – first place	2025 Amman	62 kg
Bronze medal – third place	2022 Mongolia	65 kg
Bronze medal – third place	2023 Astana	65 kg
Bronze medal – third place	2024 Bishkek	62 kg
South Asian Games
Gold medal – first place	2016 Guwahati	60 kg
Grand Prix
Gold medal – first place	2025 Kocaeli	62 kg
Gold medal – first place	2026 Zagreb	57 kg
Bronze medal – third place	2025 Budapest	62 kg

Manisha Bhanwala (born 10 February 1997) is an Indian freestyle wrestler. She is the first and only Indian woman to win a gold medal at the World Championships. She has also won gold medals at the 2025 Asian Championships and the 2016 South Asian Games.

== Early life ==
Manisha was born in the Rohtak district of Haryana. She started wrestling to lose weight at the behest of her father.

== Senior career results ==
Res.	Record	Opponent	Score	Date	Event	Location
24th at 62 kg
Loss	14-6	Sara Lindborg (SWE)	2-9	19 September 2023	2023 World Wrestling Championships	(Serbia) Belgrade
(gold) Gold Medall at 65 kg
Win	14-5	Yulia Leskovets (UKR)	9-3	3 June 2023	2023 Kaba Uulu Kozhomkul & Raatbek Sanatbaev Tournament	(Kyrgyzstan) Bishkek
Win	13-5	Ölziisaikhany Pürevsüren (MGL)	14-0	3 June 2023	2023 Kaba Uulu Kozhomkul & Raatbek Sanatbaev Tournament	(Kyrgyzstan) Bishkek
Win	12-5	Gaukhar Mukhatay (KAZ)	15-0	3 June 2023	2023 Kaba Uulu Kozhomkul & Raatbek Sanatbaev Tournament	(Kyrgyzstan) Bishkek
Win	11-5	Irina Kazyulina (KAZ)	19-5	3 June 2023	2023 Kaba Uulu Kozhomkul & Raatbek Sanatbaev Tournament	(Kyrgyzstan) Bishkek
(bronze) Bronze Medal at 65 kg
Win	10-5	Albina Kairgeldinova (KAZ)	13-0, Fall	12 April 2023	2023 Asian Wrestling Championships	Astana, Kazakhstan
Loss	9-5	Mahiro Yoshitake (JPN)	7-1, Fall	12 April 2023	2023 Asian Wrestling Championships	Astana, Kazakhstan
Loss	9-4	Long Jia (CHN)	0-15	12 April 2023	2023 Asian Wrestling Championships	Astana, Kazakhstan
Win	9-3	Ariukhan Jumabaeva (UZB)	11-0, Fall	12 April 2023	2023 Asian Wrestling Championships	Astana, Kazakhstan
Win	8-3	Baatarjavyn Shoovdor (MGL)	5-2	12 April 2023	2023 Asian Wrestling Championships	Astana, Kazakhstan
(bronze) Bronze Medal at 62 kg
Loss	7-3	Khadija Jlassi (TUN)	7-11	16 July 2022	2022 Zouhaier Sghaier Ranking Series	(Tunisia) Tunis
Win	7-2	Emma Bruntil (USA)	5-2	16 July 2022	2022 Zouhaier Sghaier Ranking Series	(Tunisia) Tunis
(gold) Gold Medal at 65 kg
Win	6-2	Elis Manolova (AZE)	11-0	3 June 2022	2022 Bolat Turlykhanov Cup	Almaty, Kazakhstan
Win	5-2	Ariukhan Jumabaeva (UZB)	14-0	3 June 2022	2022 Bolat Turlykhanov Cup	Almaty, Kazakhstan
Win	4-2	Dinora Rustamova (UZB)	16-0, Fall	3 June 2022	2022 Bolat Turlykhanov Cup	Almaty, Kazakhstan
Win	3-2	Yelena Shalygina (KAZ)	11-5	3 June 2022	2022 Bolat Turlykhanov Cup	Almaty, Kazakhstan
Loss	2-2	Elis Manolova (AZE)	0-15	3 June 2022	2022 Bolat Turlykhanov Cup	Almaty, Kazakhstan
(bronze) Bronze Medal at 62 kg
Win	2-1	Lee Han-bit (KOR)	9-2, Fall	22 April 2022	2022 Asian Wrestling Championships	(Mongolia) Ulaanbaatar
Loss	1-1	Nonoka Ozaki (JPN)	0-14	22 April 2022	2022 Asian Wrestling Championships	(Mongolia) Ulaanbaatar
Win	1-0	Ayaulym Kassymova (KAZ)	12-0	22 April 2022	2022 Asian Wrestling Championships	(Mongolia) Ulaanbaatar
