= Khürelkhüügiin Bolortuyaa =

Mongolian freestyle wrestler

Personal information
- Native name: Хүрэлхүүгийн Болортуяа
- Nationality: Mongolia
- Born: 3 May 1996 (age 30) Erdenet, Orkhon, Mongolia
- Height: 165 cm (5 ft 5 in)

Sport
- Country: Mongolia
- Sport: Wrestling
- Weight class: 62 kg
- Event: Freestyle
- Coached by: Batsaikhan Idersaikhan

Achievements and titles
- Olympic finals: 10th(2020)
- World finals: (bronze) (2026)
- Regional finals: (silver) (2021)
Medal record
Women's freestyle wrestling
Representing Mongolia
World Championships
Bronze medal – third place	2026 Astana	59 kg
Asian Championships
Silver medal – second place	2021 Almaty	62 kg
Bronze medal – third place	2022 Ulaanbaatar	57 kg
Golden Grand Prix Ivan Yarygin
Gold medal – first place	2020 Krasnoyarsk	62 kg
Bronze medal – third place	2022 Krasnoyarsk	57 kg
Bronze medal – third place	2023 Krasnoyarsk	59 kg
Bronze medal – third place	2026 Krasnoyarsk	59 kg
Yasar Dogu Tournament
Silver medal – second place	2022 Istanbul	57 kg
Silver medal – second place	2024 Antalya	59 kg
Olympic Qualification Tournament
Silver medal – second place	2021 Sofia	62 kg
Asian U23 Championship
Silver medal – second place	2019 Ulaanbaatar	65 kg
Asian Cadets Championship
Bronze medal – third place	2013 Ulaanbaatar	56 kg
Bronze medal – third place	2011 Bangkok	56 kg

Khürelkhüügiin Bolortuyaa (Mongolian: Хүрэлхүүгийн Болортуяа, born 3 May 1996) is a Mongolian freestyle wrestler. She represented Mongolia at the 2020 Summer Olympics in Tokyo, Japan.

== Career ==
In 2019, she won the silver medal in the women's 65 kg event at the Asian U23 Wrestling Championship held in Ulaanbaatar, Mongolia. She also won the silver medal in the women's 62 kg event at the 2021 Asian Wrestling Championships held in Almaty, Kazakhstan.

She qualified at the World Olympic Qualification Tournament in Sofia, Bulgaria to represent Mongolia at the 2020 Summer Olympics in Tokyo, Japan. She competed in the women's freestyle 62 kg event.

In January 2022, she won one of the bronze medals in the women's 57 kg event at the Golden Grand Prix Ivan Yarygin held in Krasnoyarsk, Russia. In February 2022, she won the silver medal in the 57 kg event at the Yasar Dogu Tournament held in Istanbul, Turkey.

In April 2022, she won a bronze medal at the Asian Championships in Ulaanbaatar, Mongolia.

She competed at the 2024 Asian Wrestling Olympic Qualification Tournament in Bishkek, Kyrgyzstan hoping to qualify for the 2024 Summer Olympics in Paris, France. She was eliminated in her first match and she did not qualify for the Olympics.

== Achievements ==
Year	Tournament	Location	Result	Event
2021	Asian Championships	Almaty, Kazakhstan	2nd	Freestyle 62 kg
2022	Asian Championships	Ulaanbaatar, Mongolia	3rd	Freestyle 57 kg
