= Hong Kexin =

Chinese freestyle wrestler

Personal information
- Native name: 洪可新
- Born: 6 January 2003 (age 23) Nanjing, Jiangsu, China
- Height: 163 cm (5 ft 4 in)

Sport
- Country: China
- Sport: Amateur wrestling
- Weight class: 57 kg
- Event: Freestyle
Medal record
Women's freestyle wrestling
Representing China
Olympic Games
Bronze medal – third place	2024 Paris	57 kg
World Championships
Gold medal – first place	2026 Astana	57 kg
Bronze medal – third place	2025 Zagreb	57 kg
Asian Games
Gold medal – first place	2026 Aichi–Nagoya	57 kg
Bronze medal – third place	2022 Hangzhou	57 kg
Asian Championships
Gold medal – first place	2026 Bishkek	57 kg
Bronze medal – third place	2025 Amman	57 kg

Hong Kexin (born 6 January 2003) is a Chinese freestyle wrestler. She won one of the bronze medals in the women's 57 kg event at the 2024 Summer Olympics in Paris, France. She is also a bronze medalist in the 57 kg event at the 2022 Asian Games.

== Background ==
Hong started training in wrestling at Nanjing Sport Institute in 2015. She was selected for the Chinese national team in 2023.

She competed at the 2024 Asian Wrestling Olympic Qualification Tournament in Bishkek, Kyrgyzstan and she earned a quota place for China for the 2024 Summer Olympics in Paris, France. She won one of the bronze medals in the women's 57 kg event at the Olympics.
