= Nitesh Siwach =

Indian greco-roman wrestler (born 2002)

Personal information
- Born: 21 October 2002 (age 24) Jagsi, Sonipat, Haryana

Sport
- Sport: Wrestling
- Weight class: 97 kg
- Event: Greco-Roman
Medal record
Men's Greco-Roman wrestling
Representing India
Event	1st	2nd	3rd
Asian Championships	0	1	1
Asian Games	0	1	0
U23 World Championships	0	0	1
Other	0	1	0
Total	0	3	2
Asian Games
Silver medal – second place	2026 Aichi–Nagoya	97 kg
Asian Championships
Silver medal – second place	2026 Bishkek	97 kg
Bronze medal – third place	2025 Amman	97 kg
U23 World Championships
Bronze medal – third place	2022 Pontevedra	97 kg
Asian Cadets Championships
Silver medal – second place	2019 Nur Sultan	97 kg

Nitesh Siwach (born 21 October 2002) is an Indian greco-roman wrestler from Haryana, who competes in the men's 97 kg category. He won silver medal in 97 kg event at the 2026 Asian Games.

== Early life ==
Siwach is from Jagsi village, Sonipat district, Haryana. He is the son of Anand Siwach, who runs a small time business selling milk. After a knee injury, Siwach quit wrestiling and worked as a milk delivery boy to help his father. After initially playing cricket, he switched to wrestling at Pratap Sports School, Kharkhoda where he trained under Om Prakash Dahiya.

== Career ==
Siwach defeated Mongolia's Ganbaataryn Gankhuyag in the semifinals of 2026 Asian Games by technical superiority (9–0) in the first three-minutes to enter the finals. He became the first Indian to enter the finals of a greco-roman event after the 1962 Asiad. In the quarterfinal, he beat Amanberdi Agamammedov of Turkmenistan by 7–1.

In 2019, he claimed a silver medal at the Cadet Asian Championships. In 2022, he got a bronze medal at the U23 World Championships. In 2025, he bagged a bronze in the Senior Asian Championships and claimed a silver medal in the 2026 Asian Championships.
