= 2026 World Wrestling Championships =

2026 World Championships
- Host city: Astana, Kazakhstan
- Dates: 24 October – 1 November 2026
- Stadium: Barys Arena

Champions
- Freestyle: United States
- Greco-Roman: Iran
- Women: United States

The 2026 World Wrestling Championships was held in Astana, Kazakhstan from 24 October to 1 November 2026. The venue of the competition was Barys Arena. It was the second World Wrestling Championships hosted by Kazakhstan after the 2019 World Wrestling Championships were held in Nur-Sultan.

== Competition schedule ==
All times are (UTC+5:00)

Date	Time	Event
24 October	10.30–14.30	Qualification rounds: GR 55–60–77–82 kg
24 October	19:00–20.30	Semi-finals: GR 55–60–77–82 kg
25 October	10.30–14.30	Qualification rounds: GR 72–97–130 kg; Repechage: GR 55–60–77–82 kg
25 October	16.45–17.30	Semi-finals: GR 72–97–130 kg
25 October	18.00–20.00	Finals: GR 55–60–77–82 kg
26 October	10.30–14.30	Qualification rounds: GR 63–67–87 kg; Repechage: GR 72–97–130 kg
26 October	16.45–17.30	Semi-finals: GR 63–67–87 kg
26 October	18.00–20.00	Finals: GR 72–97–130 kg
27 October	10.30–13.30	Qualification rounds: WW 50–57–65–76 kg; Repechage: GR 63–67–87 kg
27 October	16.30–17.30	Semi-finals: WW 50–57–65–76 kg
27 October	18.00–20.00	Finals: GR 63–67–87 kg
28 October	10.30–13.30	Qualification rounds: WW 53–62–68–72 kg; Repechage: WW 50–57–65–76 kg
28 October	16.30–17.30	Semi-finals: WW 53–62–68–72 kg
28 October	18.00–20.00	Finals: WW 50–57–65–76 kg
29 October	10.30–14.30	Qualification rounds: WW 55–59 kg / FS 65–97 kg; Repechage: WW 53–62–68–72 kg
29 October	16.30–17.30	Semi-finals: WW 55–59 kg / FS 65–97 kg
29 October	18.00–20.00	Finals: WW 53–62–68–72 kg
30 October	10.30–14.30	Qualification rounds: FS 61–70–86–125 kg; Repechage: WW 55–59 kg / FS 65–97 kg
30 October	16.30–17.30	Semi-finals: FS 61–70–86–125 kg
30 October	18.00–20.00	Finals: WW 55–59 kg / FS 65–97 kg
31 October	10.30–14.00	Qualification rounds: FS 57–74–79–92 kg; Repechage: FS 61–70–86–125 kg
31 October	16.30–17.30	Semi-finals: FS 57–74–79–92 kg
31 October	18.00–20.00	Finals: FS 61–70–86–125 kg
1 November	16.30–17.30	Repechage: FS 57–74–79–92 kg
1 November	18:00–20.00	Finals: FS 57–74–79–92 kg

== Medal table ==
* Host nation (Kazakhstan)

Rank	Nation	Gold	Silver	Bronze	Total
1	United States	7	2	6	15
2	Iran	6	4	5	15
3	Russia	4	3	7	14
4	Japan	3	3	4	10
5	China	3	0	3	6
6	Azerbaijan	2	2	2	6
7	India	1	2	1	4
8	Armenia	1	1	1	3
8	Ukraine	1	1	1	3
10	Belarus	1	0	4	5
11	Bulgaria	1	0	2	3
12	Kyrgyzstan	0	2	3	5
13	Moldova	0	2	1	3
14	Hungary	0	2	0	2
15	Kazakhstan*	0	1	4	5
16	Uzbekistan	0	1	2	3
17	Ecuador	0	1	0	1
17	Mexico	0	1	0	1
17	Poland	0	1	0	1
17	Turkey	0	1	0	1
21	Georgia	0	0	5	5
22	Mongolia	0	0	3	3
23	North Korea	0	0	2	2
24	Cuba	0	0	1	1
24	Czech Republic	0	0	1	1
24	Romania	0	0	1	1
24	Sweden	0	0	1	1
Totals (27 entries)		30	30	60	120

== Team ranking ==
Rank	Men's freestyle		Men's Greco-Roman		Women's freestyle	
Rank	Team	Points	Team	Points	Team	Points
1	United States	194	Iran	192	United States	137
2	Russia	185	Azerbaijan	104	Japan	135
3	Iran	133	Uzbekistan	80	China	121
4	Azerbaijan	88	Belarus	63	Ukraine	106
5	Japan	47	Kazakhstan	63	India	94
6	Kyrgyzstan	43	Russia	61	Russia	83
7	Kazakhstan	40	Bulgaria	60	Mongolia	74
8	Georgia	36	Georgia	53	Kazakhstan	63
9	Mongolia	35	China	51	Sweden	33
10	North Korea	30	Armenia	50	Kyrgyzstan	32

== Medal summary ==
=== Men's freestyle ===
Event	Gold	Silver	Bronze
57 kg	Spencer Lee; United States	Roman Bravo-Young; Mexico	Han Chong-song; North Korea Abubakar Mutaliev; Russia
61 kg	Ahmad Javan; Iran	Zaur Uguev; Russia	Kim Kwang-myong; North Korea Marcus Blaze; United States
65 kg	Bo Bassett; United States	Vazgen Tevanyan; Armenia	Rahman Amouzad; Iran Abasgadzhi Magomedov; Russia
70 kg	Ibragim Ibragimov; Russia	Ernazar Akmataliev; Kyrgyzstan	Tömör-Ochiryn Tulga; Mongolia Zain Retherford; United States
74 kg	Inalbek Sheriev; Russia	Nurkozha Kaipanov; Kazakhstan	Amir Mohammad Yazdani; Iran Yoshinosuke Aoyagi; Japan
79 kg	Levi Haines; United States	Mohammad Nokhodi; Iran	Mahamedkhabib Kadzimahamedau; Belarus Ismail Khaniev; Russia
86 kg	Kyle Dake; United States	Arsenii Dzhioev; Azerbaijan	Vladimeri Gamkrelidze; Georgia Malik Shavaev; Kyrgyzstan
92 kg	Amanula Gadzhimagomedov; Russia	Trent Hidlay; United States	Ali Tcokaev; Azerbaijan Miriani Maisuradze; Georgia
97 kg	Kyle Snyder; United States	Arash Yoshida; Japan	Abdulrashid Sadulaev; Russia Hassan Yazdani; Iran
125 kg	Amir Hossein Zare; Iran	Abdulla Kurbanov; Russia	Giorgi Meshvildishvili; Azerbaijan Wyatt Hendrickson; United States

=== Men's Greco-Roman ===
Event	Gold	Silver	Bronze
55 kg	Eldaniz Azizli; Azerbaijan	Payam Ahmadi; Iran	Vakhtang Lolua; Georgia Iskhar Kurbayev; Kazakhstan
60 kg	Koto Gomi; Japan	Ali Ahmadi Vafa; Iran	Aidos Sultangali; Kazakhstan Alisher Ganiev; Uzbekistan
63 kg	Karen Aslanyan; Armenia	Nihat Mammadli; Azerbaijan	Sergey Emelin; Russia Ozodbek Khalimboev; Uzbekistan
67 kg	Saeid Esmaeili; Iran	Aytjan Khalmakhanov; Uzbekistan	Bagdat Sabaz; Kazakhstan Luis Orta; Cuba
72 kg	Danial Sohrabi; Iran	István Váncza; Hungary	Iuri Lomadze; Georgia Amantur Ismailov; Kyrgyzstan
77 kg	Sanan Suleymanov; Azerbaijan	Alexandrin Guțu; Moldova	Ali Oskou; Iran Shuai Mamedau; Belarus
82 kg	Gholamreza Farrokhi; Iran	Yüksel Sarıçiçek; Turkey	Mihail Bradu; Moldova Akzhol Makhmudov; Kyrgyzstan
87 kg	Semen Novikov; Bulgaria	Alireza Mohmadi; Iran	Lasha Gobadze; Georgia Gevorg Tadevosyan; Armenia
97 kg	Kiryl Maskevich; Belarus	Artur Sargsian; Russia	Kiril Milov; Bulgaria Mohammad Hadi Saravi; Iran
130 kg	Fardin Hedayati; Iran	Dárius Vitek; Hungary	Pavel Hlinchuk; Belarus Jiang Wenhao; China

=== Women's freestyle ===
Event	Gold	Silver	Bronze
50 kg	Yui Susaki; Japan	Neelam Sirohi; India	Zeinep Bayanova; Kazakhstan Feng Ziqi; China
53 kg	Moe Kiyooka; Japan	Lucia Yépez; Ecuador	Andreea Ana; Romania Jonna Malmgren; Sweden
55 kg	Everest Leydecker; United States	Nataliia Klivchutska; Ukraine	Ekaterina Verbina; Russia Nagisa Harada; Japan
57 kg	Hong Kexin; China	Sena Nagamoto; Japan	Iryna Kurachkina; Belarus Helen Maroulis; United States
59 kg	Manisha Bhanwala; India	Abigail Nette; United States	Mariia Vynnyk; Ukraine Khürelkhüügiin Bolortuyaa; Mongolia
62 kg	Adaugo Nwachukwu; United States	Nonoka Ozaki; Japan	Amina Tandelova; Russia Bilyana Dudova; Bulgaria
65 kg	Alina Kasabieva; Russia	Irina Rîngaci; Moldova	Feng Yongxin; China Nana Ikehata; Japan
68 kg	Long Jia; China	Meerim Zhumanazarova; Kyrgyzstan	Kennedy Blades; United States Adéla Hanzlíčková; Czech Republic
72 kg	Li Zelu; China	Wiktoria Chołuj; Poland	Tanu Sharma; India Mahiro Yoshitake; Japan
76 kg	Anastasiya Alpyeyeva; Ukraine	Kajal Dhochak; India	Enkh-Amaryn Davaanasan; Mongolia Dymond Guilford; United States

== Participating nations ==
789 wrestlers from 90 countries participated:

- Albania (1)
- Algeria (13)
- Angola (2)
- Argentina (2)
- Armenia (16)
- American Samoa (2)
- Australia (4)
- Austria (5)
- Azerbaijan (23)
- Bahamas (1)
- Burundi (1)
- Belgium (3)
- Brazil (9)
- Bahrain (6)
- Belarus (17)
- Bulgaria (15)
- Central African Republic (1)
- Canada (15)
- Republic of the Congo (1)
- Chile (4)
- China (30)
- Ivory Coast (1)
- Colombia (4)
- Croatia (5)
- Cuba (8)
- Czech Republic (3)
- Dominican Republic (1)
- Ecuador (3)
- Egypt (9)
- Spain (4)
- Estonia (2)
- Finland (4)
- France (9)
- Guinea-Bissau (3)
- Georgia (20)
- Germany (17)
- Ghana (1)
- Greece (2)
- Guatemala (3)
- Hong Kong (4)
- Hungary (13)
- India (30)
- Iran (20)
- Italy (3)
- Jamaica (1)
- Jordan (1)
- Japan (30)
- Kazakhstan (30) (Host)
- Kenya (5)
- Kyrgyzstan (22)
- South Korea (19)
- Kosovo (1)
- Latvia (4)
- Lithuania (8)
- Morocco (9)
- Moldova (21)
- Mexico (2)
- Mongolia (23)
- Marshall Islands (1)
- North Macedonia (7)
- Mauritius (1)
- Namibia (1)
- Netherlands (1)
- Nepal (1)
- Nigeria (11)
- Norway (4)
- Nauru (2)
- Panama (1)
- Peru (1)
- Poland (12)
- North Korea (6)
- Puerto Rico (7)
- Qatar (4)
- Romania (10)
- Russia (30)
- Singapore (2)
- Sri Lanka (2)
- Sierra Leone (2)
- Serbia (6)
- Switzerland (6)
- Slovakia (5)
- Sweden (11)
- Tajikistan (8)
- Chinese Taipei (1)
- Tunisia (2)
- Turkey (30)
- Ukraine (30)
- United States (30)
- Uzbekistan (27)
- Venezuela (9)
- United World Wrestling Refugee Team (From Iran) (2)

== See also ==
- List of World Championships medalists in wrestling (freestyle)
- List of World Championships medalists in wrestling (Greco-Roman)
- List of World Championships medalists in wrestling (women)
