= Yuri Nakazato =

Japanese Greco-Roman wrestler

Personal information
- Nationality: Japanese
- Born: 26 February 2000 Ginowan, Okinawa, Japan

Professional wrestling career
- Sport: Amateur wrestling
- Weight class: 97 kg
- Club: Saga Prefectural Sports Association
Medal record
Representing Japan
Asian Games
Gold medal – first place	2026 Aichi-Nagoya	97 kg
Asian Wrestling Championships
Silver medal – second place	2025 Amman	97 kg
U23 World Championships
Bronze medal – third place	2023 Tirana	97 kg

Yuri Nakazato (Japanese: 仲里 優力, born 26 February 2000) is a Japanese Greco-Roman wrestler. Competing in the 97 kg weight category, he won the gold medal at the 2026 Asian Games and silver at the 2025 Asian Wrestling Championships. He also won a bronze medal at the 2023 U23 World Championships.

== Career ==
Nakazato was born in Ginowan, Okinawa, Japan, and began wrestling at the age of four. He attended Chubu Norin High School before studying at Nippon Sport Science University. He competes in Greco-Roman wrestling in the 97 kg category and is affiliated with the Saga Prefectural Sports Association.

In 2023, Nakazato won the bronze medal in the men's Greco-Roman 97 kg event at the U23 World Championships in Tirana, Albania. At the 2025 Asian Wrestling Championships in Amman, Jordan, he reached the final of the same weight category and won the silver medal after losing to Iran's Mohammadhadi Saravi.

At the 2026 Asian Games in Aichi-Nagoya, Japan, Nakazato competed in the men's Greco-Roman 97 kg event. He defeated Kazakhstan's Islam Yevloyev 10–0 in the quarter-final and Iran's Mehdi Mohammad Balihamzehdeh 5–4 in the semi-final. In the final, he defeated India's Nitesh Siwach 4–0 to win the gold medal for Japan.
