= 2025 Asian Wrestling Championships – Results =

These are the results of the 2025 Asian Wrestling Championships which took place between 25 and 30 March 2025 in Amman, Jordan.

== Men's freestyle ==
=== 57 kg ===
29 March

Round of 16
An Jae-yong (KOR)	0
Rakhat Kalzhan (KAZ)	10
Milad Valizadeh (IRI)	10
Gayan Ekanayake (SRI)	0
Hussein Khudur (IRQ)	11
Li Weiyu (CHN)	3
Almaz Smanbekov (KGZ)	10
Chirag Chikkara (IND)	0
Muqibullah Nezami (AFG)	2
Batkhuyagiin Mönkh-Erdene (MGL)	12
Zainal Abidin (INA)	0
Han Chong-song (PRK)	11
Rin Sakamoto (JPN)	11
Aiaal Belolyubskii (TJK)	1

Quarterfinals
Gulomjon Abdullaev (UZB)	3
Rakhat Kalzhan (KAZ)	5
Milad Valizadeh (IRI)	11
Hussein Khudur (IRQ)	0
Almaz Smanbekov (KGZ)	8
Batkhuyagiin Mönkh-Erdene (MGL)	8
Han Chong-song (PRK)	12
Rin Sakamoto (JPN)	6

Semifinals
Rakhat Kalzhan (KAZ)	0
Milad Valizadeh (IRI)	3
Batkhuyagiin Mönkh-Erdene (MGL)	6
Han Chong-song (PRK)	9

Final
Milad Valizadeh (IRI)	1
Han Chong-song (PRK)	8

Repechage round 1
Gayan Ekanayake (SRI)	0
Hussein Khudur (IRQ)	5^{F}
Zainal Abidin (INA)	0
Rin Sakamoto (JPN)	10

Bronze medals
Hussein Khudur (IRQ)	6
Rakhat Kalzhan (KAZ)	8
Rin Sakamoto (JPN)	1
Batkhuyagiin Mönkh-Erdene (MGL)	5^{F}

=== 61 kg ===
30 March

Round of 16
Ri Kum-chol (PRK)	11
Song Hyeon-sik (KOR)	0
Behruzbey Turanmuratov (UZB)	2
Tümenbilegiin Tüvshintulga (MGL)	4
Dzhamshed Sharifov (TJK)	2
Zou Wanhao (CHN)	12
Suhib Al-Marafi (JOR)	0
Bekbolot Myrzanazar Uulu (KGZ)	11

Quarterfinals
Takara Suda (JPN)	7
Ri Kum-chol (PRK)	4
Tümenbilegiin Tüvshintulga (MGL)	1
Ahmad Javan (IRI)	9
Mukhamed Balgabay (KAZ)	1
Zou Wanhao (CHN)	6
Bekbolot Myrzanazar Uulu (KGZ)	6
Udit Kumar (IND)	9

Semifinals
Takara Suda (JPN)	2
Ahmad Javan (IRI)	2
Zou Wanhao (CHN)	0
Udit Kumar (IND)	2

Final
Takara Suda (JPN)	6
Udit Kumar (IND)	4

Bronze medals
Ri Kum-chol (PRK)	1
Ahmad Javan (IRI)	6
Bekbolot Myrzanazar Uulu (KGZ)	2
Zou Wanhao (CHN)	4

=== 65 kg ===
29 March

Round of 16
Taiyrbek Zhumashbek Uulu (KGZ)	10
Charles Fernando (SRI)	0
Ursus Lee (SGP)	0
Alibeg Alibegov (BRN)	10
Kim Kwang-jin (PRK)	2
Tseveensürengiin Tsogbadrakh (MGL)	2
Yun Jun-sik (KOR)	3
Nursultan Sadyk (KAZ)	10
Kaisei Tanabe (JPN)	6
Umidjon Jalolov (UZB)	0
Sujeet Kalkal (IND)	10
Abdullah Assaf (PLE)	0
Hamka (INA)	0
Wei Baowen (CHN)	10
Gurbanmuhammet Çaryýew (TKM)	0
Abbas Ebrahimzadeh (IRI)	11

Quarterfinals
Taiyrbek Zhumashbek Uulu (KGZ)	2
Alibeg Alibegov (BRN)	0
Tseveensürengiin Tsogbadrakh (MGL)	10^{F}
Nursultan Sadyk (KAZ)	2
Kaisei Tanabe (JPN)	9
Sujeet Kalkal (IND)	0^{R}
Wei Baowen (CHN)	0
Abbas Ebrahimzadeh (IRI)	11

Semifinals
Taiyrbek Zhumashbek Uulu (KGZ)	2
Tseveensürengiin Tsogbadrakh (MGL)	5
Kaisei Tanabe (JPN)	13
Abbas Ebrahimzadeh (IRI)	1

Final
Tseveensürengiin Tsogbadrakh (MGL)	2
Kaisei Tanabe (JPN)	12

Repechage round 1
Kim Kwang-jin (PRK)	5
Nursultan Sadyk (KAZ)	2
Umidjon Jalolov (UZB)	WO
Sujeet Kalkal (IND)

Bronze medals
Kim Kwang-jin (PRK)	2
Taiyrbek Zhumashbek Uulu (KGZ)	1
Umidjon Jalolov (UZB)	0
Abbas Ebrahimzadeh (IRI)	10

- Tseveensürengiin Tsogbadrakh of Mongolia originally won the silver medal, but was disqualified after he tested positive for Testosterone. Kim Kwang-jin was upgraded to the silver medal and Taiyrbek Zhumashbek Uulu to the bronze medal.

=== 70 kg ===
29 March

Round of 16
Mohammed Al-Jawad (IRQ)	7
Yoo Seon-ho (KOR)	1
Begijon Kuldashev (UZB)	10
Şirmuhammet Bekiýew (TKM)	0
Ernazar Akmataliev (KGZ)	5
Nachyn Kuular (KAZ)	4
Vishal Kaliraman (IND)	0
Tömör-Ochiryn Tulga (MGL)	8
Zaid Meslah (JOR)	0
Viktor Rassadin (TJK)	11

Quarterfinals
Yoshinosuke Aoyagi (JPN)	11
Mohammed Al-Jawad (IRQ)	0
Begijon Kuldashev (UZB)	1
Ernazar Akmataliev (KGZ)	7
Wei Tao (CHN)	0
Tömör-Ochiryn Tulga (MGL)	10
Viktor Rassadin (TJK)	11
Sina Khalili (IRI)	2

Semifinals
Yoshinosuke Aoyagi (JPN)	8
Ernazar Akmataliev (KGZ)	8
Tömör-Ochiryn Tulga (MGL)	1
Viktor Rassadin (TJK)	3

Final
Ernazar Akmataliev (KGZ)	5
Viktor Rassadin (TJK)	4

Repechage round 1
Nachyn Kuular (KAZ)	4
Begijon Kuldashev (UZB)	3
Zaid Meslah (JOR)	0
Sina Khalili (IRI)	10

Bronze medals
Nachyn Kuular (KAZ)	0
Yoshinosuke Aoyagi (JPN)	8
Sina Khalili (IRI)	9^{F}
Tömör-Ochiryn Tulga (MGL)	2

=== 74 kg ===
30 March

Round of 16
Orozobek Toktomambetov (KGZ)	11
Aheiyou Tuerxun (CHN)	0
Han Dae-gil (KOR)	10
Lakmal Wijesooriya (SRI)	0
Orts Isakov (JOR)	12
Ali Isam (IRQ)	1
Gilang Ilhaza (INA)	0
Fazliddin Nasritdinov (UZB)	10
Magomedrasul Asluev (BRN)	1
Nurkozha Kaipanov (KAZ)	2
Han Ok-chol (PRK)	2
Batsükhiin Batbayar (MGL)	4
Mohammad Reza Shakeri (IRI)	5
Perman Hommadow (TKM)	0
Jaideep Narwal (IND)	5
Hikaru Takata (JPN)	10

Quarterfinals
Orozobek Toktomambetov (KGZ)	10^{F}
Han Dae-gil (KOR)	0
Orts Isakov (JOR)	3
Fazliddin Nasritdinov (UZB)	10
Nurkozha Kaipanov (KAZ)	10
Batsükhiin Batbayar (MGL)	0
Mohammad Reza Shakeri (IRI)	4
Hikaru Takata (JPN)	0

Semifinals
Orozobek Toktomambetov (KGZ)	10
Fazliddin Nasritdinov (UZB)	1
Nurkozha Kaipanov (KAZ)	6
Mohammad Reza Shakeri (IRI)	1

Final
Orozobek Toktomambetov (KGZ)	1
Nurkozha Kaipanov (KAZ)	2

Repechage round 1
Aheiyou Tuerxun (CHN)	11
Han Dae-gil (KOR)	0
Magomedrasul Asluev (BRN)	4
Batsükhiin Batbayar (MGL)	1

Bronze medals
Aheiyou Tuerxun (CHN)	4
Fazliddin Nasritdinov (UZB)	0
Magomedrasul Asluev (BRN)	2
Mohammad Reza Shakeri (IRI)	2

=== 79 kg ===
29 March

Round of 16
Erzo Isakov (JOR)	0
Ryunosuke Kamiya (JPN)	4
Arsalan Budazhapov (KGZ)	7
Lu Feng (CHN)	5
Seo Bum-gue (KOR)	4
Khidir Saipudinov (BRN)	7
Chander Mohan (IND)	12
Asadbek Karimov (UZB)	2
Kakamyrat Aşyrow (TKM)	2
Mehdi Yousefi (IRI)	12

Quarterfinals
Olonbayaryn Süldkhüü (MGL)	4
Ryunosuke Kamiya (JPN)	0
Arsalan Budazhapov (KGZ)	6
Khidir Saipudinov (BRN)	7
Magomet Evloev (TJK)	6^{F}
Chander Mohan (IND)	6
Mehdi Yousefi (IRI)	11
Daulet Yergesh (KAZ)	4

Semifinals
Olonbayaryn Süldkhüü (MGL)	1
Khidir Saipudinov (BRN)	7
Magomet Evloev (TJK)	5
Mehdi Yousefi (IRI)	8

Final
Khidir Saipudinov (BRN)	0
Mehdi Yousefi (IRI)	10

Repechage round 1
Seo Bum-gue (KOR)	0
Arsalan Budazhapov (KGZ)	4^{F}
Kakamyrat Aşyrow (TKM)	1
Daulet Yergesh (KAZ)	12

Bronze medals
Arsalan Budazhapov (KGZ)	4
Olonbayaryn Süldkhüü (MGL)	4
Daulet Yergesh (KAZ)	0
Magomet Evloev (TJK)	3^{F}

=== 86 kg ===
30 March

Round of 16
Naadambatyn Batbilgüün (MGL)	4
Salimzhoni Khalimzoda (TJK)	2
Abdallah Makoon (JOR)	0
Cao Nan (CHN)	2^{F}
Döwletgeldi Myradow (TKM)	8
Bobur Islomov (UZB)	5
Abolfazl Rahmani (IRI)	10
Mustafa Sohaib (IRQ)	0
Tatsuya Shirai (JPN)	10
Fahriansyah (INA)	0
Mukul Dahiya (IND)	12
Gary Chow (SGP)	0
Lee Gyeong-yeon (KOR)	7
Mukhammad Abdullaev (KGZ)	11

Quarterfinals
Bolat Sakayev (KAZ)	5
Naadambatyn Batbilgüün (MGL)	3
Cao Nan (CHN)	8
Döwletgeldi Myradow (TKM)	3
Abolfazl Rahmani (IRI)	10
Tatsuya Shirai (JPN)	0
Mukul Dahiya (IND)	3
Mukhammad Abdullaev (KGZ)	1

Semifinals
Bolat Sakayev (KAZ)	12
Cao Nan (CHN)	1
Abolfazl Rahmani (IRI)	11
Mukul Dahiya (IND)	0

Final
Bolat Sakayev (KAZ)	4
Abolfazl Rahmani (IRI)	11

Repechage round 1
~~Mustafa Sohaib (IRQ)~~
Tatsuya Shirai (JPN)	WO

Bronze medals
Naadambatyn Batbilgüün (MGL)	2^{F}
Cao Nan (CHN)	2
Tatsuya Shirai (JPN)	4
Mukul Dahiya (IND)	2

=== 92 kg ===
30 March

Round of 16
Abdulkareem Abuidaij (JOR)	1
Sherzod Poyonov (UZB)	11
Takashi Ishiguro (JPN)	WO
Magomed Sharipov (BRN)
Kim Gwan-uk (KOR)	4
Bekzat Rakhimov (KGZ)	6

Quarterfinals
Amir Hossein Firouzpour (IRI)	5
Sherzod Poyonov (UZB)	0
Lin Zushen (CHN)	1
Azamat Dauletbekov (KAZ)	7
Byambasürengiin Bat-Erdene (MGL)	3
Takashi Ishiguro (JPN)	5
Bekzat Rakhimov (KGZ)	7
Deepak Punia (IND)	12

Semifinals
Amir Hossein Firouzpour (IRI)	12
Azamat Dauletbekov (KAZ)	0
Takashi Ishiguro (JPN)	1
Deepak Punia (IND)	8

Final
Amir Hossein Firouzpour (IRI)	10
Deepak Punia (IND)	0

Bronze medals
Sherzod Poyonov (UZB)	1
Azamat Dauletbekov (KAZ)	2
Bekzat Rakhimov (KGZ)	0
Takashi Ishiguro (JPN)	11

=== 97 kg ===
29 March

Round of 16
Mohammad Mobin Azimi (IRI)	10
Jonty Bhati (IND)	0
Rizabek Aitmukhan (KAZ)	10
Muhamad Rudiansyah (INA)	0
Park Jeong-woo (KOR)	0
Şatlyk Hemelýäýew (TKM)	6
Ganbaataryn Gankhuyag (MGL)	3
Makhsud Veysalov (UZB)	1
Kanybek Abdulkhairov (KGZ)	11
Abdullah Arkan (IRQ)	0

Quarterfinals
~~Akhmed Tazhudinov (BRN)~~
Mohammad Mobin Azimi (IRI)	WO
Rizabek Aitmukhan (KAZ)	13
Şatlyk Hemelýäýew (TKM)	0
Habila Awusayiman (CHN)	2
Ganbaataryn Gankhuyag (MGL)	1
Kanybek Abdulkhairov (KGZ)	1
Arash Yoshida (JPN)	11

Semifinals
Mohammad Mobin Azimi (IRI)	0
Rizabek Aitmukhan (KAZ)	2
Habila Awusayiman (CHN)	2
Arash Yoshida (JPN)	11

Final
Rizabek Aitmukhan (KAZ)	1
Arash Yoshida (JPN)	7

Repechage round 1
Muhamad Rudiansyah (INA)	0
Şatlyk Hemelýäýew (TKM)	10

Bronze medals
Şatlyk Hemelýäýew (TKM)	3
Mohammad Mobin Azimi (IRI)	9
Kanybek Abdulkhairov (KGZ)	1
Habila Awusayiman (CHN)	2

=== 125 kg ===
30 March

Round of 16
Zyýamuhammet Saparow (TKM)	11
Sardorbek Kholmatov (UZB)	1
Taiki Yamamoto (JPN)	4
Nursultan Azov (KAZ)	3
Ahmed Salah (IRQ)	5
Kim Gyeong-min (KOR)	4

Quarterfinals
Mönkhtöriin Lkhagvagerel (MGL)	13
Zyýamuhammet Saparow (TKM)	2
Dinesh Dhankhar (IND)	11
Buheeerdun (CHN)	0
Shamil Sharipov (BRN)	11
Taiki Yamamoto (JPN)	0
Ahmed Salah (IRQ)	1
Amir Reza Masoumi (IRI)	11

Semifinals
Mönkhtöriin Lkhagvagerel (MGL)	5
Dinesh Dhankhar (IND)	1
Shamil Sharipov (BRN)	0
Amir Reza Masoumi (IRI)	8

Final
Mönkhtöriin Lkhagvagerel (MGL)	0
Amir Reza Masoumi (IRI)	6

Bronze medals
Zyýamuhammet Saparow (TKM)	12
Dinesh Dhankhar (IND)	14
Ahmed Salah (IRQ)	1
Shamil Sharipov (BRN)	8^{F}

== Men's Greco-Roman ==
=== 55 kg ===
25 March

Round of 16
Nitin (IND)	0
Ro Yu-chol (PRK)	9
Mönkhzayaagiin Sumiyaabazar (MGL)	0
Lu Yun (CHN)	9
Yu Jun-sik (KOR)	1
Kohei Yamagiwa (JPN)	11
Alexander Cuevas (SGP)	0
Sajjad Ali (IRQ)	9
Mostafa Al-Qade (JOR)	3
Yerbol Kamaliyev (KAZ)	9^{F}
Ikhtiyor Botirov (UZB)	9
Abduwali Rahimbaýew (TKM)	0

Quarterfinals
Pouya Dadmarz (IRI)	1
Ro Yu-chol (PRK)	3
Lu Yun (CHN)	0
Kohei Yamagiwa (JPN)	6
Sajjad Ali (IRQ)	12
Yerbol Kamaliyev (KAZ)	3
Ikhtiyor Botirov (UZB)	9
Ulan Muratbek Uulu (KGZ)	0

Semifinals
Ro Yu-chol (PRK)	9
Kohei Yamagiwa (JPN)	11
Sajjad Ali (IRQ)	9^{F}
Ikhtiyor Botirov (UZB)	5

Final
Kohei Yamagiwa (JPN)	7
Sajjad Ali (IRQ)	1

Repechage round 1
Yu Jun-sik (KOR)	2
Lu Yun (CHN)	10
Alexander Cuevas (SGP)	3
Yerbol Kamaliyev (KAZ)	5^{F}

Bronze medals
Lu Yun (CHN)	0
Ro Yu-chol (PRK)	5
Yerbol Kamaliyev (KAZ)	4
Ikhtiyor Botirov (UZB)	8

=== 60 kg ===
26 March

Round of 16
Bakytzhan Kabdyl (KAZ)	0
Kaito Inaba (JPN)	9
Sumit Dalal (IND)	9
Kim Min-woo (KOR)	0
Aslamjon Azizov (TJK)	10
Arslanbek Zakirbaýew (TKM)	1
Ali Abunaseer (JOR)	2
Xi Ziyue (CHN)	5

Quarterfinals
Ri Se-ung (PRK)	12
Kaito Inaba (JPN)	2
Sumit Dalal (IND)	2
Pouya Nasserpour (IRI)	6
Akyl Sulaimanov (KGZ)	4
Aslamjon Azizov (TJK)	3
Xi Ziyue (CHN)	3
Alisher Ganiev (UZB)	13^{F}

Semifinals
Ri Se-ung (PRK)	8
Pouya Nasserpour (IRI)	4
Akyl Sulaimanov (KGZ)	0
Alisher Ganiev (UZB)	9^{F}

Final
Ri Se-ung (PRK)	6
Alisher Ganiev (UZB)	4

Bronze medals
Kaito Inaba (JPN)	1
Pouya Nasserpour (IRI)	1
Xi Ziyue (CHN)	3
Akyl Sulaimanov (KGZ)	3

=== 63 kg ===
25 March

Round of 16
Azatjan Açilow (TKM)	0
Godai Mitani (JPN)	8
Tan Haodong (CHN)	6
Aref Mohammadi (QAT)	3
Chung Han-jae (KOR)	8
Namsrain Ganbayar (MGL)	0
Sultan Assetuly (KAZ)	9
Umesh (IND)	0
Kim Chan (PRK)	13
Suhib Al-Hasanat (JOR)	2

Quarterfinals
Mohammad Mehdi Keshtkar (IRI)	9
Godai Mitani (JPN)	2
Tan Haodong (CHN)	1
Chung Han-jae (KOR)	10
Doolotbek Choibekov (KGZ)	0
Sultan Assetuly (KAZ)	9
Kim Chan (PRK)	0
Aytjan Khalmakhanov (UZB)	9

Semifinals
Mohammad Mehdi Keshtkar (IRI)	9
Chung Han-jae (KOR)	3
Sultan Assetuly (KAZ)	7
Aytjan Khalmakhanov (UZB)	16

Final
Mohammad Mehdi Keshtkar (IRI)	4
Aytjan Khalmakhanov (UZB)	13

Bronze medals
Godai Mitani (JPN)	3
Chung Han-jae (KOR)	6
Kim Chan (PRK)	7
Sultan Assetuly (KAZ)	0

=== 67 kg ===
26 March

Round of 16
Marren McClaren Ravin (SGP)	0
Son Man-gwang (PRK)	9
Kwon Min-seong (KOR)	11
Meirzhan Shermakhanbet (KAZ)	5
Munthir Jandu (KSA)	0
Nozimjon Boykuziev (UZB)	5^{F}
Sunat Abdulloev (TJK)	0
Katsuaki Endo (JPN)	9
Ali Abbas (IRQ)	1
Neeraj Chhikara (IND)	3

Quarterfinals
Saeid Esmaeili (IRI)	10
Son Man-gwang (PRK)	4
Kwon Min-seong (KOR)	0
Nozimjon Boykuziev (UZB)	8
Li Lei (CHN)	7
Katsuaki Endo (JPN)	9
Neeraj Chhikara (IND)	0
Razzak Beishekeev (KGZ)	9

Semifinals
Saeid Esmaeili (IRI)	8
Nozimjon Boykuziev (UZB)	0
Katsuaki Endo (JPN)	1
Razzak Beishekeev (KGZ)	5

Final
Saeid Esmaeili (IRI)	3
Razzak Beishekeev (KGZ)	0

Bronze medals
Son Man-gwang (PRK)	2
Nozimjon Boykuziev (UZB)	2
Neeraj Chhikara (IND)	0
Katsuaki Endo (JPN)	5

=== 72 kg ===
26 March

Round of 16
Loiqi Amirkhonzoda (TJK)	8
Jason Baucas (PHI)	0
Hamad Al-Naimi (QAT)
Kuldeep Malik (IND)	WO
Omar Al-Daraghmeh (JOR)	0
Danial Sohrabi (IRI)	11
Yryskeldi Khamzaev (KGZ)	11
Adilkhan Satayev (KAZ)	7
Issei Honna (JPN)	8
Noh Yeong-hun (KOR)	0
Begmyrat Nobatow (TKM)	9
Ahmed Barahmah (KSA)	0

Quarterfinals
Leng Ji (CHN)	5
Loiqi Amirkhonzoda (TJK)	1
Kuldeep Malik (IND)	0
Danial Sohrabi (IRI)	8
Yryskeldi Khamzaev (KGZ)	4
Issei Honna (JPN)	7^{F}
Begmyrat Nobatow (TKM)	1
Abdullo Aliev (UZB)	4

Semifinals
Leng Ji (CHN)	0
Danial Sohrabi (IRI)	9
Issei Honna (JPN)	1
Abdullo Aliev (UZB)	6

Final
Danial Sohrabi (IRI)	8
Abdullo Aliev (UZB)	0

Repechage round 1
Omar Al-Daraghmeh (JOR)	WO
Kuldeep Malik (IND)

Bronze medals
Omar Al-Daraghmeh (JOR)	3
Leng Ji (CHN)	11
Begmyrat Nobatow (TKM)	0
Issei Honna (JPN)	10

=== 77 kg ===
25 March

Round of 16
Ibragim Magomadov (KAZ)	7
Lee Do-won (KOR)	1
Sagar Thakran (IND)	4^{F}
Aryan Azman (SGP)	0
Yu Jixin (CHN)	6
Amro Sadeh (JOR)	6
Kodai Sakuraba (JPN)
Alireza Abdevali (IRI)	WO
Rafeeq El-Natsheh (QAT)	0
Yao Lai-hsing (TPE)	8
Nyam-Erdeniin Orgil (MGL)	0
Hekim Gurbanmyradow (TKM)	4^{F}
Muslihiddin Uroqov (TJK)	0
Yryskeldi Maksatbek Uulu (KGZ)	8

Quarterfinals
Aram Vardanyan (UZB)	9
Ibragim Magomadov (KAZ)	0
Sagar Thakran (IND)	0
Amro Sadeh (JOR)	10
Alireza Abdevali (IRI)	11
Yao Lai-hsing (TPE)	2
Hekim Gurbanmyradow (TKM)	2
Yryskeldi Maksatbek Uulu (KGZ)	10

Semifinals
Aram Vardanyan (UZB)	9
Amro Sadeh (JOR)	0
Alireza Abdevali (IRI)	4
Yryskeldi Maksatbek Uulu (KGZ)	3

Final
Aram Vardanyan (UZB)	4
Alireza Abdevali (IRI)	2

Repechage round 1
Kodai Sakuraba (JPN)
Yao Lai-hsing (TPE)	WO

Bronze medals
Ibragim Magomadov (KAZ)	11
Amro Sadeh (JOR)	3
Yao Lai-hsing (TPE)	0
Yryskeldi Maksatbek Uulu (KGZ)	2^{F}

=== 82 kg ===
26 March

Round of 16
Toýly Orazow (TKM)	0
Shi Likui (CHN)	9
Mohammad Naghousi (IRI)	1
Mukhammadkodir Rasulov (UZB)	1
Habibjon Zuhurov (TJK)	7
Rahul Badshra (IND)	10

Quarterfinals
Taizo Yoshida (JPN)	5
Shi Likui (CHN)	0
Omar Satayev (KAZ)	11
Kang Bo-seong (KOR)	0
Bekzat Orunkul Uulu (KGZ)	1
Mohammad Naghousi (IRI)	4
Rahul Badshra (IND)	0
Shahin Badaghi (QAT)	9

Semifinals
Taizo Yoshida (JPN)	0
Omar Satayev (KAZ)	10^{F}
Mohammad Naghousi (IRI)	4
Shahin Badaghi (QAT)	3

Final
Omar Satayev (KAZ)	1
Mohammad Naghousi (IRI)	3

Repechage round 1
Mukhammadkodir Rasulov (UZB)	7
Bekzat Orunkul Uulu (KGZ)	1

Bronze medals
Kang Bo-seong (KOR)	6
Taizo Yoshida (JPN)	6
Mukhammadkodir Rasulov (UZB)	5
Shahin Badaghi (QAT)	6

=== 87 kg ===
25 March

Round of 16
Park Sang-hyeok (KOR)	6
So Sakabe (JPN)	1

Quarterfinals
Jalgasbay Berdimuratov (UZB)	10
Park Sang-hyeok (KOR)	0
Asan Zhanyshov (KGZ)	3
Shamil Ozhaev (KAZ)	5
Sunil Kumar (IND)	10
Sukhrob Abdulkhaev (TJK)	1
Huang Jiaxin (CHN)	0
Yasin Yazdi (IRI)	8

Semifinals
Jalgasbay Berdimuratov (UZB)	5
Shamil Ozhaev (KAZ)	1
Sunil Kumar (IND)	1
Yasin Yazdi (IRI)	3

Final
Jalgasbay Berdimuratov (UZB)	7
Yasin Yazdi (IRI)	2

Bronze medals
Park Sang-hyeok (KOR)	1
Shamil Ozhaev (KAZ)	5
Huang Jiaxin (CHN)	1
Sunil Kumar (IND)	5

=== 97 kg ===
26 March

Round of 16
Eduard Babenoshev (TJK)	0
Amanberdi Agamämmedow (TKM)	9
Bekhruz Barnoev (UZB)	9
Ibrahim Fallatah (KSA)	0
Park Je-woo (KOR)	1
Yuri Nakazato (JPN)	12

Quarterfinals
Mohammad Hadi Saravi (IRI)	8
Amanberdi Agamämmedow (TKM)	0
Ilyas Guchigov (KAZ)	0
Nitesh Siwach (IND)	9
Zhang Youfang (CHN)	5
Bekhruz Barnoev (UZB)	1
Yuri Nakazato (JPN)	8
Melis Aitbekov (KGZ)	0

Semifinals
Mohammad Hadi Saravi (IRI)	9
Nitesh Siwach (IND)	0
Zhang Youfang (CHN)	2
Yuri Nakazato (JPN)	3

Final
Mohammad Hadi Saravi (IRI)	8
Yuri Nakazato (JPN)	0

Repechage round 1
Park Je-woo (KOR)	9
Melis Aitbekov (KGZ)	2

Bronze medals
Amanberdi Agamämmedow (TKM)	0
Nitesh Siwach (IND)	9
Park Je-woo (KOR)	3
Zhang Youfang (CHN)	3^{F}

=== 130 kg ===
25 March

Round of 16
Ali Yaseen (IRQ)	9
Prem Saroha (IND)	0
Erlan Manatbekov (KGZ)	0
Fardin Hedayati (IRI)	8

Quarterfinals
Alimkhan Syzdykov (KAZ)	8
Ali Yaseen (IRQ)	0
Al-Mutasem Kasasbah (JOR)	0
Temurbek Nasimov (UZB)	4^{F}
Yuta Nara (JPN)	13
Kim Seon-jae (KOR)	5
Fardin Hedayati (IRI)	8
Jiang Wenhao (CHN)	0

Semifinals
Alimkhan Syzdykov (KAZ)	4
Temurbek Nasimov (UZB)	1
Yuta Nara (JPN)	0
Fardin Hedayati (IRI)	9

Final
Alimkhan Syzdykov (KAZ)	0
Fardin Hedayati (IRI)	7

Repechage round 1
Erlan Manatbekov (KGZ)	15
Jiang Wenhao (CHN)	5

Bronze medals
Ali Yaseen (IRQ)	6
Temurbek Nasimov (UZB)	4
Erlan Manatbekov (KGZ)	3
Yuta Nara (JPN)	7

== Women's freestyle ==
=== 50 kg ===
27 March

Round of 16
Lin Yi-hui (TPE)	8
Dương Thị Nga (VIE)	1
Zhang Yu (CHN)	10
Byambasürengiin Mönkhnar (MGL)	0
Jiah Pingot (PHI)	5
Nipuni Wasana (SRI)	5
Remina Yoshimoto (JPN)	10
Ankush Panghal (IND)	0
Won Myong-gyong (PRK)	10
Gözel Kurbanowa (TKM)	0

Quarterfinals
Svetlana Ankicheva (KAZ)	10^{F}
Lin Yi-hui (TPE)	0
Zhang Yu (CHN)	4^{F}
Nipuni Wasana (SRI)	0
Cheon Mi-ran (KOR)	0
Remina Yoshimoto (JPN)	11
Won Myong-gyong (PRK)	11
Aktenge Keunimjaeva (UZB)	0

Semifinals
Svetlana Ankicheva (KAZ)	0
Zhang Yu (CHN)	10
Remina Yoshimoto (JPN)	5
Won Myong-gyong (PRK)	1

Final
Zhang Yu (CHN)	0
Remina Yoshimoto (JPN)	8

Repechage round 1
Byambasürengiin Mönkhnar (MGL)	5^{F}
Nipuni Wasana (SRI)	0
Ankush Panghal (IND)
Cheon Mi-ran (KOR)	WO

Bronze medals
Byambasürengiin Mönkhnar (MGL)	3
Svetlana Ankicheva (KAZ)	0
Cheon Mi-ran (KOR)	0
Won Myong-gyong (PRK)	10

=== 53 kg ===
28 March

Round of 16
Park Seo-young (KOR)	2
Zeinep Bayanova (KAZ)	4
Aliah Rose Gavalez (PHI)	0
Zhang Jin (CHN)	10
Shokhida Akhmedova (UZB)	5
Hsieh Meng-hsuan (TPE)	6

Quarterfinals
Choe Hyo-gyong (PRK)	10
Zeinep Bayanova (KAZ)	0
Noura Taaibin (JOR)	0
Chinboldyn Otgontuyaa (MGL)	2^{F}
Antim Panghal (IND)	10
Zhang Jin (CHN)	6
Hsieh Meng-hsuan (TPE)	0
Moe Kiyooka (JPN)	10

Semifinals
Choe Hyo-gyong (PRK)	10
Chinboldyn Otgontuyaa (MGL)	0
Antim Panghal (IND)	0
Moe Kiyooka (JPN)	10

Final
Choe Hyo-gyong (PRK)	12
Moe Kiyooka (JPN)	1

Bronze medals
Zeinep Bayanova (KAZ)	10
Chinboldyn Otgontuyaa (MGL)	6
Hsieh Meng-hsuan (TPE)	0
Antim Panghal (IND)	10

=== 55 kg ===
27 March

Round of 16
Oh Kyong-ryong (PRK)	13
Aruuke Kadyrbek Kyzy (KGZ)	2
Bayanmönkhiin Otgontuyaa (MGL)	10
Lee Hye-rim (KOR)	0
Li Yuxuan (CHN)	10
Nishu Bhanwala (IND)	0

Quarterfinals
Haruna Okuno (JPN)	5
Oh Kyong-ryong (PRK)	6
Layal Sukkar (JOR)	0
Dilshoda Matnazarova (UZB)	7^{F}
Zulfiya Yakhyarova (KAZ)	0
Bayanmönkhiin Otgontuyaa (MGL)	11
Li Yuxuan (CHN)	2^{F}
Nguyễn Thị Mỹ Trang (VIE)	0

Semifinals
Oh Kyong-ryong (PRK)	6^{F}
Dilshoda Matnazarova (UZB)	0
Bayanmönkhiin Otgontuyaa (MGL)	0
Li Yuxuan (CHN)	10

Final
Oh Kyong-ryong (PRK)	8
Li Yuxuan (CHN)	1

Repechage round 1
Aruuke Kadyrbek Kyzy (KGZ)	0
Haruna Okuno (JPN)	4^{F}
Nishu Bhanwala (IND)	3
Nguyễn Thị Mỹ Trang (VIE)	0

Bronze medals
Haruna Okuno (JPN)	8
Dilshoda Matnazarova (UZB)	0
Nishu Bhanwala (IND)	0
Bayanmönkhiin Otgontuyaa (MGL)	4^{F}

=== 57 kg ===
28 March

Round of 16
Nilufar Raimova (KAZ)	1
Neha Sharma (IND)	8
Khürelkhüügiin Bolortuyaa (MGL)	14^{F}
Đặng Thị Hiền (VIE)	7
Kwon Young-jin (KOR)	8^{F}
Nethmi Ahinsa (SRI)	8
Liao Pei-ying (TPE)	0
Son Il-sim (PRK)	10

Quarterfinals
Hong Kexin (CHN)	10
Neha Sharma (IND)	0
Khürelkhüügiin Bolortuyaa (MGL)	0
Sara Natami (JPN)	11
Danielle Lim (SGP)	0
Kwon Young-jin (KOR)	7^{F}
Son Il-sim (PRK)	4^{F}
Sezim Zhumanazarova (KGZ)	0

Semifinals
Hong Kexin (CHN)	0
Sara Natami (JPN)	2^{F}
Kwon Young-jin (KOR)	0
Son Il-sim (PRK)	6^{F}

Final
Sara Natami (JPN)	2
Son Il-sim (PRK)	2

Repechage round 1
Liao Pei-ying (TPE)	2^{F}
Sezim Zhumanazarova (KGZ)	0

Bronze medals
Khürelkhüügiin Bolortuyaa (MGL)	0
Hong Kexin (CHN)	10
Liao Pei-ying (TPE)	2
Kwon Young-jin (KOR)	12^{F}

=== 59 kg ===
27 March

Round of 16
Muskan Nandal (IND)	10
Arian Carpio (PHI)	0
Hong Pyol (PRK)	10
Sarbinaz Jienbaeva (UZB)	0

Quarterfinals
Sakura Onishi (JPN)	12
Muskan Nandal (IND)	2
Tancholpon Kybalbekova (KGZ)	2
Togtokhyn Altjin (MGL)	8
Kwon Hyeon-ju (KOR)	0
Xie Mengyu (CHN)	10
Hong Pyol (PRK)	12
Guldana Bekesh (KAZ)	1

Semifinals
Sakura Onishi (JPN)	10
Togtokhyn Altjin (MGL)	0
Xie Mengyu (CHN)	0
Hong Pyol (PRK)	4

Final
Sakura Onishi (JPN)	6
Hong Pyol (PRK)	4

Repechage round 1
Sarbinaz Jienbaeva (UZB)	1
Guldana Bekesh (KAZ)	3

Bronze medals
Muskan Nandal (IND)	4
Togtokhyn Altjin (MGL)	0
Guldana Bekesh (KAZ)	0
Xie Mengyu (CHN)	10

=== 62 kg ===
28 March

Round of 16
Nonoka Ozaki (JPN)	12
Sükheegiin Tserenchimed (MGL)	5
Tynys Dubek (KAZ)	0
Manisha Bhanwala (IND)	11

Quarterfinals
Lili (CHN)	1
Nonoka Ozaki (JPN)	4
Tala Abukheit (JOR)	0
Kim Ok-ju (PRK)	10
Kalmira Bilimbek Kyzy (KGZ)	10
Miyasar Kushmuratova (UZB)	4
Manisha Bhanwala (IND)	3^{F}
Lee Han-bit (KOR)	0

Semifinals
Nonoka Ozaki (JPN)	0
Kim Ok-ju (PRK)	4^{F}
Kalmira Bilimbek Kyzy (KGZ)	1
Manisha Bhanwala (IND)	5

Final
Kim Ok-ju (PRK)	7
Manisha Bhanwala (IND)	8

Repechage round 1
Tynys Dubek (KAZ)	2
Lee Han-bit (KOR)	0

Bronze medals
Tala Abukheit (JOR)	0
Nonoka Ozaki (JPN)	10
Tynys Dubek (KAZ)	3
Kalmira Bilimbek Kyzy (KGZ)	10^{F}

=== 65 kg ===
28 March

Round of 16
Lại Diệu Thương (VIE)	6
Gaukhar Mukatay (KAZ)	2^{F}
Zhang Qi (CHN)	10
Monika Sheoran (IND)	0
Aylah Mayali (PLE)	2
Shakhzoda Allaniyazova (UZB)	12
Bark Jeong-ae (KOR)	13
Balqis Taaibin (JOR)	2

Quarterfinals
Miwa Morikawa (JPN)	9^{F}
Gaukhar Mukatay (KAZ)	2
Zhang Qi (CHN)	10
Dilnaz Sazanova (KGZ)	3
Maýsa Ýusupjanowa (TKM)	4
Shakhzoda Allaniyazova (UZB)	8^{F}
Bark Jeong-ae (KOR)	0
Tüvshinjargalyn Enkhjin (MGL)	4^{F}

Semifinals
Miwa Morikawa (JPN)	8
Zhang Qi (CHN)	4
Shakhzoda Allaniyazova (UZB)	0
Tüvshinjargalyn Enkhjin (MGL)	4^{F}

Final
Miwa Morikawa (JPN)	6
Tüvshinjargalyn Enkhjin (MGL)	2

Bronze medals
Gaukhar Mukatay (KAZ)	0
Zhang Qi (CHN)	10
Bark Jeong-ae (KOR)	1
Shakhzoda Allaniyazova (UZB)	5

=== 68 kg ===
27 March

Round of 16
Gulnura Tashtanbekova (KGZ)	2^{F}
Firuza Esenbaeva (UZB)	8
Mansi Lather (IND)	10
Cai Sheng-fang (TPE)	0

Quarterfinals
Pak Sol-gum (PRK)	11^{F}
Gulnura Tashtanbekova (KGZ)	4
Kim Mi-ju (KOR)	0
Enkhsaikhany Delgermaa (MGL)	9^{F}
Li Zelu (CHN)	4^{F}
Irina Kazyulina (KAZ)	0
Mansi Lather (IND)	WO
Ami Ishii (JPN)

Semifinals
Pak Sol-gum (PRK)	8
Enkhsaikhany Delgermaa (MGL)	2
Li Zelu (CHN)	10
Mansi Lather (IND)	1

Final
Pak Sol-gum (PRK)	0
Li Zelu (CHN)	4^{F}

Bronze medals
Gulnura Tashtanbekova (KGZ)	2
Enkhsaikhany Delgermaa (MGL)	14
Irina Kazyulina (KAZ)	2
Mansi Lather (IND)	12

=== 72 kg ===
28 March

Quarterfinals		Semifinals		Final
Zhamila Bakbergenova (KAZ)	10
Kim Se-hee (KOR)	0	Zhamila Bakbergenova (KAZ)	3
Masako Furuichi (JPN)	3	Masako Furuichi (JPN)	2
Jyoti Berwal (IND)	2			Zhamila Bakbergenova (KAZ)	4
Nurzat Nurtaeva (KGZ)	2			Liu Yuqi (CHN)	1
Svetlana Oknazarova (UZB)	2^{F}	Svetlana Oknazarova (UZB)	2
Liu Yuqi (CHN)	6^{F}	Liu Yuqi (CHN)	5
Zorigtyn Bolortungalag (MGL)	4

Bronze medals
Kim Se-hee (KOR)	0
Masako Furuichi (JPN)	10
Zorigtyn Bolortungalag (MGL)	4^{F}
Svetlana Oknazarova (UZB)	0

=== 76 kg ===
27 March

Round of 16
Ozoda Zaripboeva (UZB)	0
Yangla (CHN)	10
Jiang Yan-ju (TPE)	2
Jeong Seo-yeon (KOR)	9^{F}

Quarterfinals
Aiperi Medet Kyzy (KGZ)	3
Yangla (CHN)	0
Kim Mi-hyang (PRK)	12
Elmira Syzdykova (KAZ)	0
Enkh-Amaryn Davaanasan (MGL)	2
Nodoka Yamamoto (JPN)	4
Jeong Seo-yeon (KOR)	0
Reetika Hooda (IND)	10

Semifinals
Aiperi Medet Kyzy (KGZ)	4^{F}
Kim Mi-hyang (PRK)	0
Nodoka Yamamoto (JPN)	0
Reetika Hooda (IND)	10^{F}

Final
Aiperi Medet Kyzy (KGZ)	7
Reetika Hooda (IND)	6

Bronze medals
Yangla (CHN)	8
Kim Mi-hyang (PRK)	5
Jeong Seo-yeon (KOR)	0
Nodoka Yamamoto (JPN)	10
