= Wrestling at the 2026 Asian Games – Men's freestyle 86 kg =

Men's freestyle 86 kg at the 2026 Asian Games
- Venue: Inae Sports Center
- Date: 2 October 2026
- Competitors: 16 from 16 nations

Medalists
gold medal	Mohammad Nokhodi	Iran
silver medal	Hayato Ishiguro	Japan
bronze medal	Malik Shavaev	Kyrgyzstan
bronze medal	Olonbayaryn Süldkhüü	Mongolia

The men's 86 kilograms freestyle wrestling competition at the 2026 Asian Games was held on 2 October 2026 at the Inae Sports Center in Nagoya. The event was competed by 16 competitors. Mohammad Nokhodi of Iran won the gold medal after defeating Hayato Ishiguro of Japan in the final. Malik Shavaev of Kyrgyzstan and Olonbayaryn Süldkhüü of Mongolia won the bronze medals.

== Background ==
Men's freestyle wrestling was first contested at the 1954 Asian Games in Manila. It has been contested at every edition of the Asian Games since then.

Iran's Hassan Yazdani was the defending champion, having won the gold medal in the men's freestyle 86 kg event at the 2022 Asian Games in Hangzhou. India's Deepak Punia was the silver medalist, while Uzbekistan's Javrail Shapiev and Turkmenistan's Döwletmyrat Orazgylyjow won bronze medals. However, none of them returned to compete in the 2026 edition.

Iran's Mohammad Nokhodi was a five-time World Championships medalist in the 79 kg category, having won silver medals in 2021 and 2022 and bronze medals in 2023, 2024 and 2025. Japan's Hayato Ishiguro won the silver medal in the 86 kg category at the 2025 World Wrestling Championships in Zagreb. He had previously won a bronze medal in the same category at the 2023 Asian Wrestling Championships.

Kazakhstan's Azamat Dauletbekov was a two-time World Championships bronze medalist. He had also won seven medals at the Asian Wrestling Championships including three consecutive gold medals in the 86 kg category in 2022, 2023, and 2024. Mongolia's Olonbayaryn Süldkhüü had won bronze medals in the 79 kg category at the 2025 Asian Wrestling Championships and 2026 Asian Wrestling Championships.

== Format ==
The freestyle wrestling competition was competed as a single-elimination tournament. The two finalists competed against each other for the gold and silver medals. Each wrestler who loses to one of the two finalists moves into the repechage rounds, which is used to determine the bronze medals. The losers of the semifinals compete against the remaining repechage opponent from their half of the bracket in the bronze medal bout.

== Schedule ==
The men's freestyle 74 kg event was held on 2 October 2026 held at the Inae Sports Center in Nagoya.

All times are Japan Standard Time (UTC+09:00)

Schedule
Date	Time	Event
Friday, 2 October 2026	10:30	1/8 finals
Friday, 2 October 2026	10:30	1/4 finals
Friday, 2 October 2026	10:30	Semifinals
Friday, 2 October 2026	10:30	Repechages
Friday, 2 October 2026	18:00	Finals

== Summary ==
The competition consisted of 16 wrestlers representing 16 countries.

Nokhodi won his first two bouts by technical superiority before he defeated Malik Shavaev of Kyrgyzstan to set up a clash with Ishiguro in the final. Ishiguro advanced to the final after defeating Kazakhstan's Azamat Dauletbekov 4–2 in the first round and Pakistan's Noman Zaka 10–0 in the quarterfinals. In the semifinals, he defeated Mongolia's Süldkhüü by technical superiority in 2 minutes and 40 seconds.

In the final, Nokhodi initially established a two point lead in the first period after a takedown. In the second period, Ishiguro attempted a takedown but Nokhodi countered the move and was awarded two points following a successful challenge. While Ishiguro subsequently scored a stepout, Nokhodi responded with a takedown and a stepout to extend his lead to 7–1. In the last minute of the second period, Ishiguro scored two points after tripping Nokhodi and three more points including two stepouts, to reduce the deficit to 7–6. However, Nokhodi defended against Ishiguro's final front body-lock throw attempt and scored two more points to win 9–6. Thus, Nokhodilarimi claimed the gold medal, while Ishiguro settled for silver.

Shavaev and Olonbayar won the two bronze medals. Olonbayar defeated Dauletbekov 5–3 in his bronze-medal bout, scoring a decisive takedown with two seconds remaining after the scores were level. Shavaev defeated Lee Gyeong-yeon of South Korea 12–1 by technical superiority to win the other bronze medal.<

== Results ==
Legend

- F — Won by fall

=== Main bracket ===
1/8 finals
Bobur Islomov (UZB)	10
Nikhil Raj Patel (NEP)	0
Khidir Saipudinov (BRN)	5
Malik Shavaev (KGZ)	9
Lee Gyeong-yeon (KOR)	11
Chiranuwat Chamnanjan (THA)	0
Mohammad Nokhodi (IRI)	11
Rayyan Aburiala (PLE)	0
Olonbayaryn Süldkhüü (MGL)	11
Lakmal Wijesooriya (SRI)	0
Ayidusi Hade (CHN)	1
Alp Arslan Begenjow (TKM)	5
Heng Vuthy (CAM)	4
Nouman Zaka (PAK)	10^{F}
Hayato Ishiguro (JPN)	4
Azamat Dauletbekov (KAZ)	2

1/4 finals
Bobur Islomov (UZB)	2
Malik Shavaev (KGZ)	10
Lee Gyeong-yeon (KOR)	1
Mohammad Nokhodi (IRI)	11
Olonbayaryn Süldkhüü (MGL)	4
Alp Arslan Begenjow (TKM)	0
Nouman Zaka (PAK)	0
Hayato Ishiguro (JPN)	10

Semifinals
Malik Shavaev (KGZ)	0
Mohammad Nokhodi (IRI)	3
Olonbayaryn Süldkhüü (MGL)	0
Hayato Ishiguro (JPN)	10

Final
Mohammad Nokhodi (IRI)	9
Hayato Ishiguro (JPN)	6

=== Repechage ===
Repechage
Rayyan Aburiala (PLE)	0
Lee Gyeong-yeon (KOR)	7
Azamat Dauletbekov (KAZ)	10
Nouman Zaka (PAK)	0

Bronze medal matches
Lee Gyeong-yeon (KOR)	1
Malik Shavaev (KGZ)	12
Azamat Dauletbekov (KAZ)	3
Olonbayaryn Süldkhüü (MGL)	5

== Final standing ==
Rank	Athlete
1st place, gold medalist(s)	Mohammad Nokhodi (IRI)
2nd place, silver medalist(s)	Hayato Ishiguro (JPN)
3rd place, bronze medalist(s)	Malik Shavaev (KGZ)
3rd place, bronze medalist(s)	Olonbayaryn Süldkhüü (MGL)
5	Lee Gyeong-yeon (KOR)
5	Azamat Dauletbekov (KAZ)
7	Nouman Zaka (PAK)
8	Bobur Islomov (UZB)
9	Alp Arslan Begenjow (TKM)
10	Khidir Saipudinov (BRN)
11	Ayidusi Hade (CHN)
12	Heng Vuthy (CAM)
13	Nikhil Raj Patel (NEP)
14	Chiranuwat Chamnanjan (THA)
15	Lakmal Wijesooriya (SRI)
16	Rayyan Aburiala (PLE)
