= 2025 World Wrestling Championships – Men's freestyle 79 kg =

Wrestling competitions

Men's freestyle 79 kg at the 2025 World Championships
- Venue: Arena Zagreb
- Dates: 14–15 September 2025
- Competitors: 27 from 26 nations

Medalists
gold medal	Georgios Kougioumtsidis	Greece
silver medal	Levi Haines	United States
bronze medal	Mohammad Nokhodi	Iran
bronze medal	Khidir Saipudinov	Bahrain

The men's freestyle 79 kilograms is a competition featured at the 2025 World Wrestling Championships, and was held in Zagreb, Croatia on 14 and 15 September 2025.

This freestyle wrestling competition consists of a single-elimination tournament, with a repechage used to determine the winner of two bronze medals. The two finalists face off for gold and silver medals. Each wrestler who loses to one of the two finalists moves into the repechage, culminating in a pair of bronze medal matches, featuring the semifinal losers each facing the remaining repechage opponent from their half of the bracket.

== Results ==
Legend

- F — Won by fall
- WO — Won by walkover

=== Final ===
Final
Georgios Kougioumtsidis (GRE)	3
Levi Haines (USA)	2

=== Top half ===
Round of 32
Dzhabrail Gadzhiev (AZE)	WO
~~Alfred Daniel (SLE)~~
Marko Nikolić (CRO)	0
Aheiyou Tuerxun (CHN)	8^{F}
Georgios Kougioumtsidis (GRE)	10
Ryunosuke Kamiya (JPN)	0
Mikey Labriola (PUR)	10
Amit Chhikara (IND)	0
Alans Amirovs (LAT)	0
Vasyl Mykhailov (UKR)	11

Round of 16
Achsarbek Gulajev (SVK)	1
Dzhabrail Gadzhiev (AZE)	2
Aheiyou Tuerxun (CHN)	0
Georgios Kougioumtsidis (GRE)	11
Mohammad Nokhodi (IRI)	4
Mikey Labriola (PUR)	0
Vasyl Mykhailov (UKR)	6^{F}
Magomet Evloev (TJK)	2

Quarterfinals
Dzhabrail Gadzhiev (AZE)	0
Georgios Kougioumtsidis (GRE)	8
Mohammad Nokhodi (IRI)	2
Vasyl Mykhailov (UKR)	1

Semifinals
Georgios Kougioumtsidis (GRE)	8
Mohammad Nokhodi (IRI)	3

=== Bottom half ===
Round of 32
Iakub Shikhdzamalov (ROU)	2
Akhmed Usmanov (UWW)	6
Dejan Mitrov (MKD)	3
Seo Bum-gue (KOR)	3
Levi Haines (USA)	5
Khidir Saipudinov (BRN)	2
Zelimkhan Khadjiev (FRA)	11
Patrik Leder (CAN)	0
Azymberdi Saparow (TKM)	5
Vlad Stratan (MDA)	14
Metehan Yaprak (TUR)	5
Bolat Sakayev (KAZ)	4

Round of 16
Vladimeri Gamkrelidze (GEO)	1
Akhmed Usmanov (UWW)	4
Seo Bum-gue (KOR)	0
Levi Haines (USA)	10
Zelimkhan Khadjiev (FRA)	7
Vlad Stratan (MDA)	2
Metehan Yaprak (TUR)	5
Olonbayaryn Süldkhüü (MGL)	11

Quarterfinals
Akhmed Usmanov (UWW)	2
Levi Haines (USA)	3
Zelimkhan Khadjiev (FRA)	1
Olonbayaryn Süldkhüü (MGL)	3

Semifinals
Levi Haines (USA)	4
Olonbayaryn Süldkhüü (MGL)	1

=== Repechage ===
Repechage round 1
Ryunosuke Kamiya (JPN)	11
Aheiyou Tuerxun (CHN)	0
Khidir Saipudinov (BRN)	10
Seo Bum-gue (KOR)	0

Repechage round 2
Ryunosuke Kamiya (JPN)	3
Dzhabrail Gadzhiev (AZE)	5
Khidir Saipudinov (BRN)	4
Akhmed Usmanov (UWW)	2

Bronze medals
Dzhabrail Gadzhiev (AZE)	2
Mohammad Nokhodi (IRI)	4
Khidir Saipudinov (BRN)	9
Olonbayaryn Süldkhüü (MGL)	2

== Final standing ==
Rank	Athlete
1st place, gold medalist(s)	Georgios Kougioumtsidis (GRE)
2nd place, silver medalist(s)	Levi Haines (USA)
3rd place, bronze medalist(s)	Mohammad Nokhodi (IRI)
3rd place, bronze medalist(s)	Khidir Saipudinov (BRN)
5	Dzhabrail Gadzhiev (AZE)
5	Olonbayaryn Süldkhüü (MGL)
7	Vasyl Mykhailov (UKR)
8	Zelimkhan Khadjiev (FRA)
9	Akhmed Usmanov (UWW)
10	Aheiyou Tuerxun (CHN)
11	Ryunosuke Kamiya (JPN)
12	Mikey Labriola (PUR)
13	Vlad Stratan (MDA)
14	Metehan Yaprak (TUR)
15	Seo Bum-gue (KOR)
16	Azymberdi Saparow (TKM)
17	Bolat Sakayev (KAZ)
18	Dejan Mitrov (MKD)
19	Iakub Shikhdzamalov (ROU)
20	Achsarbek Gulajev (SVK)
21	Vladimeri Gamkrelidze (GEO)
22	Magomet Evloev (TJK)
23	Marko Nikolić (CRO)
24	Amit Chhikara (IND)
25	Alans Amirovs (LAT)
26	Patrik Leder (CAN)
—	Alfred Daniel (SLE)
