= 2024 World Wrestling Championships – Men's freestyle 79 kg =

Wrestling competitions

Men's freestyle 79 kg at the 2024 World Championships
- Venue: Tirana Olympic Park
- Dates: 30–31 October 2024
- Competitors: 33 from 31 nations

Medalists
gold medal	Magomed Magomaev
silver medal	Mohammad Nokhodi	Iran
bronze medal	Kota Takahashi	Japan
bronze medal	Achsarbek Gulajev	Slovakia

The men's freestyle 79 kilograms is a competition featured at the 2024 World Wrestling Championships, and was held in Tirana, Albania on 30 and 31 October.

This freestyle wrestling competition consists of a single-elimination tournament, with a repechage used to determine the winner of two bronze medals. The two finalists face off for gold and silver medals. Each wrestler who loses to one of the two finalists moves into the repechage, culminating in a pair of bronze medal matches, featuring the semifinal losers each facing the remaining repechage opponent from their half of the bracket.

Each bout consists of a single round within a six-minute limit, including two halves of three minutes. The wrestler who scores more points is the winner.

== Results ==
Legend

- F — Won by fall
- WO — Won by walkover

=== Finals ===
Semifinals		Final
Mohammad Nokhodi (IRI)	8
Avtandil Kentchadze (GEO)	14	Avtandil Kentchadze (GEO)	13
Achsarbek Gulajev (SVK)	3	Magomed Magomaev (AIN)	4
Magomed Magomaev (AIN)	9

=== Top half ===
==== Section 1 ====
Round of 64
Zurab Kapraev (ROU)	1
Zelimkhan Khadjiev (FRA)	4

Round of 32
Mohammad Nokhodi (IRI)	10
Alans Amirovs (LAT)	0
Murad Kuramagomedov (HUN)	5
Cao Nan (CHN)	0
Zelimkhan Khadjiev (FRA)	0
Jordan Burroughs (USA)	4
Magomet Evloev (TJK)	6^{F}
Khidir Saipudinov (BRN)	3

Round of 16
Mohammad Nokhodi (IRI)	3
Murad Kuramagomedov (HUN)	0
Jordan Burroughs (USA)	4
Magomet Evloev (TJK)	2

Quarterfinals
Mohammad Nokhodi (IRI)	6
Jordan Burroughs (USA)	4

==== Section 2 ====
Round of 64

Round of 32
Avtandil Kentchadze (GEO)	11
Metehan Yaprak (TUR)	0
Andrzej Sokalski (POL)	1
Kota Takahashi (JPN)	7
Parvinder Singh (IND)	4
Mikalai Savenka (AIN)	2
Daulet Yergesh (KAZ)	6
Mihail Georgiev (BUL)	2

Round of 16
Avtandil Kentchadze (GEO)	12
Kota Takahashi (JPN)	1
Parvinder Singh (IND)	2
Daulet Yergesh (KAZ)	8

Quarterfinals
Avtandil Kentchadze (GEO)	10
Daulet Yergesh (KAZ)	0

=== Bottom half ===
==== Section 3 ====
Round of 64

Round of 32
Achsarbek Gulajev (SVK)	WO
~~Raffaele Matrullo (ITA)~~
Traian Căpățînă (MDA)	10
Orges Lila (ALB)	0
Arsalan Budazhapov (KGZ)	7
Adam Thomson (CAN)	0
Lucas Kahnt (GER)	5
Ahmad Magomedov (MKD)	2

Round of 16
Achsarbek Gulajev (SVK)	11
Traian Căpățînă (MDA)	4
Arsalan Budazhapov (KGZ)	1
Lucas Kahnt (GER)	5

Quarterfinals
Achsarbek Gulajev (SVK)	2
Lucas Kahnt (GER)	1

==== Section 4 ====
Round of 64

Round of 32
Chemseddine Fetairia (ALG)	0
Shane Jones (PUR)	10
Mirzo Khayitov (UZB)	6
Valentyn Babii (UKR)	6
Magomed Magomaev (AIN)	12
Olonbayaryn Süldkhüü (MGL)	1
Arman Avagyan (ARM)	0
Orkhan Abbasov (AZE)	4

Round of 16
Shane Jones (PUR)	9
Mirzo Khayitov (UZB)	1
Magomed Magomaev (AIN)	7
Orkhan Abbasov (AZE)	1

Quarterfinals
Shane Jones (PUR)	0
Magomed Magomaev (AIN)	10

=== Repechage ===
Repechage round 2
Metehan Yaprak (TUR)	11
Kota Takahashi (JPN)	12
Olonbayaryn Süldkhüü (MGL)	5
Orkhan Abbasov (AZE)	4

Repechage round 3
Kota Takahashi (JPN)	21
Daulet Yergesh (KAZ)	10
Olonbayaryn Süldkhüü (MGL)	4
Shane Jones (PUR)	0

Bronze medals
Kota Takahashi (JPN)	0
Mohammad Nokhodi (IRI)	10
Olonbayaryn Süldkhüü (MGL)	1
Achsarbek Gulajev (SVK)	2

== Final standing ==
Rank	Athlete
1st place, gold medalist(s)	Magomed Magomaev (AIN)
2nd place, silver medalist(s)	Mohammad Nokhodi (IRI)
3rd place, bronze medalist(s)	Kota Takahashi (JPN)
3rd place, bronze medalist(s)	Achsarbek Gulajev (SVK)
5	Olonbayaryn Süldkhüü (MGL)
6	Shane Jones (PUR)
7	Daulet Yergesh (KAZ)
8	Jordan Burroughs (USA)
9	Lucas Kahnt (GER)
10	Magomet Evloev (TJK)
11	Traian Căpățînă (MDA)
12	Orkhan Abbasov (AZE)
13	Arsalan Budazhapov (KGZ)
14	Mirzo Khayitov (UZB)
15	Parvinder Singh (IND)
16	Murad Kuramagomedov (HUN)
17	Zelimkhan Khadjiev (FRA)
18	Metehan Yaprak (TUR)
19	Valentyn Babii (UKR)
20	Mikalai Savenka (AIN)
21	Ahmad Magomedov (MKD)
22	Mihail Georgiev (BUL)
23	Zurab Kapraev (ROU)
24	Andrzej Sokalski (POL)
25	Khidir Saipudinov (BRN)
26	Arman Avagyan (ARM)
27	Cao Nan (CHN)
28	Adam Thomson (CAN)
29	Chemseddine Fetairia (ALG)
30	Alans Amirovs (LAT)
31	Orges Lila (ALB)
—	Raffaele Matrullo (ITA)
DQ	Avtandil Kentchadze (GEO)

- Avtandil Kentchadze from Georgia originally won the gold medal, but was disqualified due to doping.
