= 2026 Ulaanbaatar Open =

- Host city: Ulaanbaatar, Mongolia
- Dates: 4-7 June 2025
- Stadium: Buyant Ukhaa Sport Palace

Champions
- Freestyle: Russia
- Greco-Roman: India
- Women: North Korea

The 2026 Ulaanbaatar Open was a wrestling event held in Ulaanbaatar, Mongolia, from 4 to 7 June 2026. It was held as the third Ranking Series event of United World Wrestling in 2026.

With an aim to reward wrestlers participating in Ranking Series tournaments, the United World Wrestling will award prize money to the medal winners in all weight classes with a total prize money of 390,000 Swiss Francs. The gold medal winners at the four Ranking Series tournaments in 2023 will receive 1500 Swiss Francs with the silver medallists getting 750 Swiss Francs. The two bronze medallists will receive 500 Swiss Francs each.

== Ranking Series ==
Ranking Series Calendar 2026:

- 1st Ranking Series: 4-8 February, Croatia, Zagreb ⇒ 2026 Grand Prix Zagreb Open
- 2nd Ranking Series: 25 February-1 March, Tirana, Albania ⇒ 2026 Muhamet Malo Tournament
- 3rd Ranking Series: 4-7 June, Mongolia, Ulaanbaatar ⇒ 2026 Ulaanbaatar Open
- 4th Ranking Series: 15-19 July, Hungary, Budapest ⇒ 2026 Polyák Imre & Varga János Memorial Tournament

== Medal table ==
* Host nation (Mongolia)

Rank	Nation	Gold	Silver	Bronze	Total
1	India	8	0	9	17
2	Iran	6	3	2	11
3	North Korea	5	4	1	10
4	Russia	3	2	2	7
5	Mongolia*	2	4	6	12
6	Bulgaria	2	4	0	6
7	China	1	3	2	6
8	Kyrgyzstan	1	2	8	11
9	South Korea	1	0	3	4
10	Poland	1	0	2	3
11	Kazakhstan	0	4	7	11
12	Japan	0	2	1	3
13	Turkey	0	1	4	5
14	Nigeria	0	1	2	3
15	Romania	0	0	2	2
16	Australia	0	0	1	1
16	Venezuela	0	0	1	1
Totals (17 entries)		30	30	53	113

== Medal overview ==
=== Men's freestyle ===
Event	Gold	Silver	Bronze
57 kg	Musa Mekhtikhanov; Russia	Han Chong-song; North Korea	Meirambek Kartbay; Kazakhstan
57 kg	Musa Mekhtikhanov; Russia	Han Chong-song; North Korea	Sumit Malik; India
61 kg	Deepak; India	Assyl Aitakyn; Kazakhstan	Ahoura Khateri; Iran
61 kg	Deepak; India	Assyl Aitakyn; Kazakhstan	Adilet Almukhamedov; Kazakhstan
65 kg	Rahman Amouzad; Iran	Shamil Mamedov; Bulgaria	Mohit Kumar; India
65 kg	Rahman Amouzad; Iran	Shamil Mamedov; Bulgaria	Kim Kwang-jin; North Korea
70 kg	Tömör-Ochiryn Tulga; Mongolia	Rustamzhan Kakharov; Kyrgyzstan	Aden Sakybaev; Kyrgyzstan
70 kg	Tömör-Ochiryn Tulga; Mongolia	Rustamzhan Kakharov; Kyrgyzstan	Magomed-Emi Eltemirov; Russia
74 kg	Sagar Jaglan; India	Tamir Eshinimaev; Russia	Tumen Bodiev; Russia
74 kg	Sagar Jaglan; India	Tamir Eshinimaev; Russia	Jaideep Narwal; India
79 kg	Ismail Khaniev; Russia	Mehdi Yousefi; Iran	Olonbayaryn Süldkhüü; Mongolia
79 kg	Ismail Khaniev; Russia	Mehdi Yousefi; Iran	Shamsat Tair; Kazakhstan
86 kg	Mohammad Nokhodi; Iran	Magomed Ramazanov; Bulgaria	Malik Shavaev; Kyrgyzstan
86 kg	Mohammad Nokhodi; Iran	Magomed Ramazanov; Bulgaria	Bolat Sakayev; Kazakhstan
92 kg	Askhab Saadulaev; Russia	Azamat Dauletbekov; Kazakhstan	Abolfazl Rahmani; Iran
92 kg	Askhab Saadulaev; Russia	Azamat Dauletbekov; Kazakhstan	Byambasürengiin Bat-Erdene; Mongolia
97 kg	Mukhamed-Takhir Khaniev; Russia	Tömörbaataryn Demchigdorj; Mongolia	Tuxige; China
97 kg	Mukhamed-Takhir Khaniev; Russia	Tömörbaataryn Demchigdorj; Mongolia	Vicky Hooda; India
125 kg	Dinesh Dhankhar; India	Yedige Kassimbek; Kazakhstan	Kamil Kościółek; Poland
125 kg	Dinesh Dhankhar; India	Yedige Kassimbek; Kazakhstan	Robert Baran; Poland

=== Men's Greco-Roman ===
Event	Gold	Silver	Bronze
55 kg	Payam Ahmadi; Iran	Mönkh-Erdeniin Davaabandi; Mongolia	Muhammet Emin Çakır; Turkey
60 kg	Ali Ahmadi Vafa; Iran	Ro Yu-chol; North Korea	Akyl Sulaimanov; Kyrgyzstan
60 kg	Ali Ahmadi Vafa; Iran	Ro Yu-chol; North Korea	Sahil Kadyan; India
63 kg	Zholaman Sharshenbekov; Kyrgyzstan	Mohammad Mehdi Keshtkar; Iran	Yerkebulan Ardakov; Kazakhstan
67 kg	Jin Xinxin; China	Murat Fırat; Turkey	Tsuchika Shimoyamada; Australia
67 kg	Jin Xinxin; China	Murat Fırat; Turkey	Alamusi; China
72 kg	Danial Sohrabi; Iran	Mohammad Javad Rezaei; Iran	Amanat Samat Uulu; Kyrgyzstan
72 kg	Danial Sohrabi; Iran	Mohammad Javad Rezaei; Iran	Zhantoro Mirzaliev; Kyrgyzstan
77 kg	Stoyan Kubatov; Bulgaria	Bai Amuguleng; China	Bekzat Orunkul Uulu; Kyrgyzstan
77 kg	Stoyan Kubatov; Bulgaria	Bai Amuguleng; China	Noh Yeong-hun; South Korea
82 kg	Deyvid Dimitrov; Bulgaria	Aik Mnatsakanian; Bulgaria	Imur Temirbekov; Kyrgyzstan
87 kg	Sunil Kumar; India	Azat Salidinov; Kyrgyzstan	Lee Seung-hwan; South Korea
87 kg	Sunil Kumar; India	Azat Salidinov; Kyrgyzstan	Luis Avendaño; Venezuela
97 kg	Nitesh Siwach; India	Nurassyl Amanaly; Kazakhstan	Ganbaataryn Gankhuyag; Mongolia
97 kg	Nitesh Siwach; India	Nurassyl Amanaly; Kazakhstan	Lee Min-ho; South Korea
130 kg	Kim Min-seok; South Korea	Batbayaryn Nambardagva; Mongolia	Olzhas Syrlybay; Kazakhstan

=== Women's freestyle ===
Event	Gold	Silver	Bronze
50 kg	Kim Son-hyang; North Korea	Bao Anqi; China	Neelam Sirohi; India
50 kg	Kim Son-hyang; North Korea	Bao Anqi; China	Miyu Nakamura; Japan
53 kg	Oh Kyong-ryong; North Korea	Moe Kiyooka; Japan	Christianah Ogunsanya; Nigeria
53 kg	Oh Kyong-ryong; North Korea	Moe Kiyooka; Japan	Andreea Ana; Romania
55 kg	Choe Hyo-gyong; North Korea	Natsumi Masuda; Japan	Tuba Demir; Turkey
55 kg	Choe Hyo-gyong; North Korea	Natsumi Masuda; Japan	Hansika Lamba; India
57 kg	Manisha Bhanwala; India	Son Il-sim; North Korea	Nilufar Raimova; Kazakhstan
57 kg	Manisha Bhanwala; India	Son Il-sim; North Korea	Elvira Süleyman Kamaloğlu; Turkey
59 kg	Neha Sangwan; India	Hong Pyol; North Korea	Khürelkhüügiin Bolortuyaa; Mongolia
62 kg	Kim Ok-ju; North Korea	Bilyana Dudova; Bulgaria	Mansi Ahlawat; India
62 kg	Kim Ok-ju; North Korea	Bilyana Dudova; Bulgaria	Esther Kolawole; Nigeria
65 kg	Mun Hyon-gyong; North Korea	Zhang Shuai; China	Tüvshinjargalyn Enkhjin; Mongolia
68 kg	Enkhsaikhany Delgermaa; Mongolia	Elizaveta Petliakova; Russia	Kateryna Zelenykh; Romania
68 kg	Enkhsaikhany Delgermaa; Mongolia	Elizaveta Petliakova; Russia	Nesrin Baş; Turkey
72 kg	Wiktoria Chołuj; Poland	Zorigtyn Bolortungalag; Mongolia	Erdene-Ochiryn Odgerel; Mongolia
76 kg	Kajal Dhochak; India	Damola Ojo; Nigeria	Priya Malik; India
76 kg	Kajal Dhochak; India	Damola Ojo; Nigeria	Elmira Syzdykova; Kazakhstan

== Participating nations ==
290 wrestlers from 23 countries:

1. Australia (3)
2. Belarus (1)
3. Bulgaria (6)
4. China (18)
5. India (45)
6. Iran (11)
7. Japan (3)
8. Kazakhstan (31)
9. Kyrgyzstan (12)
10. South Korea (23)
11. Mongolia (72) (Host)
12. Nigeria (4)
13. Philippines (1)
14. Poland (4)
15. North Korea (12)
16. Puerto Rico (1)
17. Romania (5)
18. Russia (17)
19. Singapore (2)
20. Tajikistan (1)
21. Turkey (7)
22. United States (2)
23. Venezuela (9)

== Results ==
=== Men's freestyle ===
==== Men's freestyle 57 kg ====
Round of 16
Ankush Chandram (IND)	8
Sarantuyaagiin Jigüür (MGL)	1
Darian Cruz (PUR)	1
Mönkh-Erdeniin Davaabandi (MGL)	2
Aiaal Belolyubskii (TJK)	8
Han Chong-song (PRK)	18
Pedro Mejías (VEN)	WO
Dengburile (CHN)
Zorigoogiin Batmend (MGL)	1
Abzal Okenov (KAZ)	2
Merey Bazarbayev (KAZ)	2
Musa Mekhtikhanov (RUS)	6
Sumit Malik (IND)	16
Han Sang-boum (KOR)	5

Quarterfinals
Meirambek Kartbay (KAZ)	9
Ankush Chandram (IND)	5
Mönkh-Erdeniin Davaabandi (MGL)	0
Han Chong-song (PRK)	10
Pedro Mejías (VEN)	4
Abzal Okenov (KAZ)	7
Musa Mekhtikhanov (RUS)	8
Sumit Malik (IND)	7

Semifinals
Meirambek Kartbay (KAZ)	1
Han Chong-song (PRK)	4
Abzal Okenov (KAZ)	1
Musa Mekhtikhanov (RUS)	12

Final
Han Chong-song (PRK)	6
Musa Mekhtikhanov (RUS)	6

Repechage round
Aiaal Belolyubskii (TJK)	6
Mönkh-Erdeniin Davaabandi (MGL)	0
Merey Bazarbayev (KAZ)	3
Sumit Malik (IND)	4

Bronze medals
Aiaal Belolyubskii (TJK)	0
Meirambek Kartbay (KAZ)	8
Sumit Malik (IND)	6
Abzal Okenov (KAZ)	3

==== Men's freestyle 61 kg ====
Round of 16
Gankhülegiin Batnasan (MGL)	10
Dorjpüreviin Tserendondov (MGL)	0
Assylzhan Yessengeldi (KAZ)	7
Adilet Almukhamedov (KAZ)	10

Quarterfinals
Zandanbudyn Zanabazar (MGL)	2
Gankhülegiin Batnasan (MGL)	2
Ahoura Khateri (IRI)	2
Assyl Aitakyn (KAZ)	4
Bair Baianduev (RUS)	0
Deepak (IND)	6
Adilet Almukhamedov (KAZ)	3
Georgii Okorokov (AUS)	1

Semifinals
Gankhülegiin Batnasan (MGL)	2
Assyl Aitakyn (KAZ)	3
Deepak (IND)	7
Adilet Almukhamedov (KAZ)	1

Final
Assyl Aitakyn (KAZ)	0
Deepak (IND)	6

Bronze medals
Ahoura Khateri (IRI)	7
Gankhülegiin Batnasan (MGL)	0
Bair Baianduev (RUS)	0
Adilet Almukhamedov (KAZ)	4

==== Men's freestyle 65 kg ====
Round of 16
Batbaataryn Gantulga (MGL)	WO
Sujeet Kalkal (IND)
Byambasürengiin Zeneemeder (MGL)	0
CJ Composto (USA)	10
Shamil Mamedov (BUL)	10
Mohit Kumar (IND)	0
Yun Jun-sik (KOR)	8
Davaanyamyn Törbayar (MGL)	4
Kim Kwang-jin (PRK)	8^{F}
Rohit Singh (IND)	3

Quarterfinals
Ossimzhan Dastanbek (KAZ)	5
Batbaataryn Gantulga (MGL)	1
CJ Composto (USA)	0
Shamil Mamedov (BUL)	10
Adlan Askarov (KAZ)	5
Yun Jun-sik (KOR)	0
Kim Kwang-jin (PRK)	0
Rahman Amouzad (IRI)	5

Semifinals
Ossimzhan Dastanbek (KAZ)	1
Shamil Mamedov (BUL)	12
Adlan Askarov (KAZ)	1
Rahman Amouzad (IRI)	12

Final
Shamil Mamedov (BUL)	10
Rahman Amouzad (IRI)	17

Repechage round
Mohit Kumar (IND)	9^{F}
CJ Composto (USA)	10

Bronze medals
Mohit Kumar (IND)	17
Ossimzhan Dastanbek (KAZ)	6
Kim Kwang-jin (PRK)	7
Adlan Askarov (KAZ)	6

==== Men's freestyle 70 kg ====
Round of 16
Aden Sakybaev (KGZ)	1
Rustamzhan Kakharov (KGZ)	6
Abhimanyou Mandwal (IND)	0
Tömör-Ochiryn Tulga (MGL)	9
Magomed-Emi Eltemirov (RUS)	10
Batsaikhany Zandanbat (MGL)	0

Quarterfinals
Rodion Anchugin (KAZ)	3
Rustamzhan Kakharov (KGZ)	4
Bakdaulet Akimzhan (KAZ)	6
Ösökhbayaryn Baatarkhüü (MGL)	9
Cross Wasilewski (USA)	4
Tömör-Ochiryn Tulga (MGL)	5
Magomed-Emi Eltemirov (RUS)	6
Konstantin Kaprynov (RUS)	2

Semifinals
Rustamzhan Kakharov (KGZ)	10
Ösökhbayaryn Baatarkhüü (MGL)	0
Tömör-Ochiryn Tulga (MGL)	2
Magomed-Emi Eltemirov (RUS)	0

Final
Rustamzhan Kakharov (KGZ)
Tömör-Ochiryn Tulga (MGL)	WO

Repechage round
Aden Sakybaev (KGZ)	8^{F}
Rodion Anchugin (KAZ)	0
Abhimanyou Mandwal (IND)	5
Cross Wasilewski (USA)	2

Bronze medals
Aden Sakybaev (KGZ)	4
Ösökhbayaryn Baatarkhüü (MGL)	3
Abhimanyou Mandwal (IND)	0
Magomed-Emi Eltemirov (RUS)	10

==== Men's freestyle 74 kg ====
Round of 16
Jeon Jin-su (KOR)	0
Tumen Bodiev (RUS)	4
Bayin Erihetu (CHN)	2
Darkhan Yessengali (KAZ)	7
Tamir Eshinimaev (RUS)	6
Han Sang-ho (KOR)	0
Jaideep Narwal (IND)	2^{F}
Batuqinggele (CHN)	2
Han Dae-gil (KOR)	WO
~~Erdenebatyn Tögsjargal (MGL)~~

Quarterfinals
Zandanbudyn Sumiyaabazar (MGL)	0
Tumen Bodiev (RUS)	2
Darkhan Yessengali (KAZ)	1
Tamir Eshinimaev (RUS)	11
Sagar Jaglan (IND)	7
Jaideep Narwal (IND)	2
Han Dae-gil (KOR)	1
Mönkhbatyn Tolui (MGL)	10

Semifinals
Tumen Bodiev (RUS)	1
Tamir Eshinimaev (RUS)	2
Sagar Jaglan (IND)	10
Mönkhbatyn Tolui (MGL)	0

Final
Tamir Eshinimaev (RUS)	2
Sagar Jaglan (IND)	3

Repechage round
Han Sang-ho (KOR)	9
Darkhan Yessengali (KAZ)	7

Bronze medals
Han Sang-ho (KOR)	1
Tumen Bodiev (RUS)	3
Jaideep Narwal (IND)	15
Mönkhbatyn Tolui (MGL)	4

==== Men's freestyle 79 kg ====
Round of 16
Ganboldyn Khangaibayar (MGL)	0
Ismail Khaniev (RUS)	11
Bekzat Rakhimov (KGZ)	6
Mohit (IND)	2

Quarterfinals
Sandeep Singh Mann (IND)	0
Ismail Khaniev (RUS)	10
Olonbayaryn Süldkhüü (MGL)	10
Baatarkhüügiin Gan-Erdene (MGL)	0
Nurdaulet Kuanyshbay (KAZ)	0
Mehdi Yousefi (IRI)	11
Bekzat Rakhimov (KGZ)	0^{R}
Shamsat Tair (KAZ)	6

Semifinals
Ismail Khaniev (RUS)	14
Olonbayaryn Süldkhüü (MGL)	4
Mehdi Yousefi (IRI)	13
Shamsat Tair (KAZ)	2

Final
Ismail Khaniev (RUS)	10
Mehdi Yousefi (IRI)	0

Repechage round
Ganboldyn Khangaibayar (MGL)	7
Sandeep Singh Mann (IND)	11

Bronze medals
Sandeep Singh Mann (IND)	0
Olonbayaryn Süldkhüü (MGL)	10
Nurdaulet Kuanyshbay (KAZ)	4
Shamsat Tair (KAZ)	5

==== Men's freestyle 86 kg ====
Round of 16
Bat-Erdeniin Byambadorj (MGL)	0
Mohammad Nokhodi (IRI)	10
Gary Chow (SGP)	0
Hwang Tae-gyu (KOR)	10
Mukul Dahiya (IND)	0
Malik Shavaev (KGZ)	10
Abdulmuslim Abulmuslimov (RUS)	12
Pürevdagvyn Bilgüündalai (MGL)	2
Magomed Ramazanov (BUL)	8
Bolat Sakayev (KAZ)	2
Gang Suhe (CHN)	6
Lee Gyeong-yeon (KOR)	2

Quarterfinals
Aryan (IND)	0
Mohammad Nokhodi (IRI)	10
Hwang Tae-gyu (KOR)	0
Malik Shavaev (KGZ)	7
Abdulmuslim Abulmuslimov (RUS)	0
Magomed Ramazanov (BUL)	5
Gang Suhe (CHN)	0
Naadambatyn Batbilgüün (MGL)	2

Semifinals
Mohammad Nokhodi (IRI)	8
Malik Shavaev (KGZ)	5
Magomed Ramazanov (BUL)	10
Naadambatyn Batbilgüün (MGL)	0

Final
Mohammad Nokhodi (IRI)	WO
Magomed Ramazanov (BUL)

Repechage round 1
Bat-Erdeniin Byambadorj (MGL)	9
Aryan (IND)	7
Bolat Sakayev (KAZ)	11
Abdulmuslim Abulmuslimov (RUS)	0

Bronze medal matches
Bat-Erdeniin Byambadorj (MGL)	0
Malik Shavaev (KGZ)	10
Bolat Sakayev (KAZ)	10
Naadambatyn Batbilgüün (MGL)	0

==== Men's freestyle 92 kg ====
Round of 16
Azamat Dauletbekov (KAZ)	5
Bekzat Amangali (KAZ)	4
Byambasürengiin Bat-Erdene (MGL)	7
Dembereliin Delgerdalai (MGL)	6

Quarterfinals
Abolfazl Rahmani (IRI)	4
Azamat Dauletbekov (KAZ)	4
Ryu Sung-yup (KOR)	5
Punit Kumar (IND)	16^{C}
Tserenpuntsagyn Ganbat (MGL)	0
Askhab Saadulaev (RUS)	10
Byambasürengiin Bat-Erdene (MGL)	14
Yelnar Shildebay (KAZ)	4

Semifinals
Azamat Dauletbekov (KAZ)	10
Punit Kumar (IND)	0
Askhab Saadulaev (RUS)	5
Byambasürengiin Bat-Erdene (MGL)	0

Final
Azamat Dauletbekov (KAZ)	3
Askhab Saadulaev (RUS)	6

Repechage round
Bekzat Amangali (KAZ)	6
Abolfazl Rahmani (IRI)	8

Bronze medals
Abolfazl Rahmani (IRI)	4^{F}
Punit Kumar (IND)	0
Tserenpuntsagyn Ganbat (MGL)	1
Byambasürengiin Bat-Erdene (MGL)	4

==== Men's freestyle 97 kg ====
Round of 16
Nurdaulet Bekenov (KAZ)	3
Tömörbaataryn Demchigdorj (MGL)	4
Vicky Hooda (IND)	8
Cristián Sarco (VEN)	0
Ganbaataryn Gankhuyag (MGL)	0
Mukhamed-Takhir Khaniev (RUS)	2

Quarterfinals
Thomas Barns (AUS)	2
Tömörbaataryn Demchigdorj (MGL)	9
Kim Pu-reun (KOR)	0
Tuxige (CHN)	11^{F}
Deepak Chahal (IND)	5
Vicky Hooda (IND)	16
Mukhamed-Takhir Khaniev (RUS)	WO
~~Yaraslau Slavikouski (BLR)~~

Semifinals
Tömörbaataryn Demchigdorj (MGL)	2
Tuxige (CHN)	1
Vicky Hooda (IND)	0
Mukhamed-Takhir Khaniev (RUS)	10

Final
Tömörbaataryn Demchigdorj (MGL)	0
Mukhamed-Takhir Khaniev (RUS)	10

Repechage round 1
Nurdaulet Bekenov (KAZ)	6
Thomas Barns (AUS)	0
Ganbaataryn Gankhuyag (MGL)	WO
~~Yaraslau Slavikouski (BLR)~~

Bronze medal matches
Nurdaulet Bekenov (KAZ)	0
Tuxige (CHN)	11
Ganbaataryn Gankhuyag (MGL)	0
Vicky Hooda (IND)	4

==== Men's freestyle 125 kg ====
Round of 16
Kim Gwan-uk (KOR)	1
Yedige Kassimbek (KAZ)	7
Buheeerdun (CHN)	10
Darmaabazaryn Narantulga (MGL)	0
~~Chinbatyn Altangerel (MGL)~~
Dinesh Dhankhar (IND)	WO
Timur Kotaev (RUS)	4
Ronak Dahiya (IND)	3

Quarterfinals
Kamil Kościółek (POL)	1
Yedige Kassimbek (KAZ)	6
Buheeerdun (CHN)	2
José Daniel Díaz (VEN)	2
Robert Baran (POL)	1
Dinesh Dhankhar (IND)	5
Timur Kotaev (RUS)	10
Batbayaryn Nambardagva (MGL)	0

Semifinals
Yedige Kassimbek (KAZ)	2
José Daniel Díaz (VEN)	2
Dinesh Dhankhar (IND)	11
Timur Kotaev (RUS)	0

Final
Yedige Kassimbek (KAZ)	0
Dinesh Dhankhar (IND)	2

Repechage round 1
Kim Gwan-uk (KOR)	0
Kamil Kościółek (POL)	10
~~Chinbatyn Altangerel (MGL)~~
Robert Baran (POL)	WO

Bronze medal matches
Kamil Kościółek (POL)	4
José Daniel Díaz (VEN)	2
Robert Baran (POL)	13
Timur Kotaev (RUS)	2

=== Men's Greco-Roman ===
==== Men's Greco-Roman 55 kg ====
Pos	Athlete	Pld	W	L	CP	TP	IRI	MGL	TUR	IND	MGL
1	Payam Ahmadi (IRI)	4	4	0	16	33	—	8–0	9–0	8–0	8–0
2	Mönkh-Erdeniin Davaabandi (MGL)	4	2	2	9	22	0–4 SU	—	3–12	14–7	5–0 Fall
3	Muhammet Emin Çakır (TUR)	4	2	2	9	24	0–4 SU	4–1 SU1	—	2–7	10–0
4	Lalit Sehrawat (IND)	4	2	2	8	23	0–4 SU	1–3 PO1	3–1 PO1	—	9–1
5	Mönkhzayaagiin Sumiyaabazar (MGL)	4	0	4	1	1	0–4 SU	0–5 FA	0–4 SU	1–4 SU1	—

Source: UWW

==== Men's Greco-Roman 60 kg ====
Quarterfinals		Semifinals		Final
Kim Seung-hak (KOR)	3
Ro Yu-chol (PRK)	13	Ro Yu-chol (PRK)	9
Akyl Sulaimanov (KGZ)	5	Akyl Sulaimanov (KGZ)	0
Baoyinjiya (CHN)	5			Ro Yu-chol (PRK)	0
Sumit Dalal (IND)	10			Ali Ahmadi Vafa (IRI)	10
Kim Da-hyun (KOR)	1	Sumit Dalal (IND)	2
Sahil Kadyan (IND)	1	Ali Ahmadi Vafa (IRI)	5^{F}
Ali Ahmadi Vafa (IRI)	7

Bronze medals
Kim Seung-hak (KOR)	0
Akyl Sulaimanov (KGZ)	9
Sahil Kadyan (IND)	WO
Sumit Dalal (IND)

==== Men's Greco-Roman 63 kg ====
Pos	Athlete	Pld	W	L	CP	TP	IRI	KGZ	IRI	IND
1	Mohammad Mehdi Keshtkar (IRI)	3	3	0	11	25	—	10–1	6–2	9–0
2	Zholaman Sharshenbekov (KGZ)	3	2	1	7	7	1–4 SU1	—	1–1	5–1
3	Erfan Jarkani (IRI)	3	1	2	6	11	1–3 PO1	1–3 PO1	—	8–0
4	Sunny Kumar (IND)	3	0	3	1	1	0–4 SU	1–3 PO1	0–4 SU	—

Source: UWW

Pos	Athlete	Pld	W	L	CP	TP	KAZ	KOR	KAZ
1	Yerkebulan Ardakov (KAZ)	2	2	0	6	14	—	9–3	5–1
2	Choi Hyun-woong (KOR)	2	1	1	4	10	1–3 PO1	—	7–5
3	Doszhan Utepkaliyev (KAZ)	2	0	2	2	6	1–3 PO1	1–3 PO1	—

Source: UWW

Semifinals
Mohammad Mehdi Keshtkar (IRI)	9
Choi Hyun-woong (KOR)	0
Yerkebulan Ardakov (KAZ)	1
Zholaman Sharshenbekov (KGZ)	3

Final
Mohammad Mehdi Keshtkar (IRI)
Zholaman Sharshenbekov (KGZ)	WO
Bronze medal
Choi Hyun-woong (KOR)	4
Yerkebulan Ardakov (KAZ)	7

==== Men's Greco-Roman 67 kg ====
Round of 16
Son Man-gwang (PRK)	1
Tsuchika Shimoyamada (AUS)	10

Quarterfinals
Karanjit Singh (IND)	3
Tsuchika Shimoyamada (AUS)	12
Namsrain Ganbayar (MGL)	2
Jin Xinxin (CHN)	11
Alamusi (CHN)	0
Murat Fırat (TUR)	8
Tserenpuntsagiin Otgonnasan (MGL)	5
Sachin Sahrawat (IND)	8

Semifinals
Tsuchika Shimoyamada (AUS)	2
Jin Xinxin (CHN)	4
Murat Fırat (TUR)	9
Sachin Sahrawat (IND)	0

Final
Jin Xinxin (CHN)	8
Murat Fırat (TUR)	3

Bronze medal match
Namsrain Ganbayar (MGL)	0
Tsuchika Shimoyamada (AUS)	9
Alamusi (CHN)	2
Sachin Sahrawat (IND)	2

==== Men's Greco-Roman 72 kg ====
Round of 16
Anil Dahiya (IND)	0
Amantur Ismailov (KGZ)	4^{F}
Kwon Min-seong (KOR)	3
Zhantoro Mirzaliev (KGZ)	5

Quarterfinals
Amanat Samat Uulu (KGZ)	10
Amantur Ismailov (KGZ)	1
Danial Sohrabi (IRI)	10
Tüvshinbaataryn Borgil (MGL)	0
Mohammad Javad Rezaei (IRI)	10
Sultan Assetuly (KAZ)	0
Zhantoro Mirzaliev (KGZ)	11
Yesönchödöriin Aldarkhüü (MGL)	1

Semifinals
Amanat Samat Uulu (KGZ)	0
Danial Sohrabi (IRI)}	9
Mohammad Javad Rezaei (IRI)	9
Zhantoro Mirzaliev (KGZ)	0

Final
Danial Sohrabi (IRI)	8
Mohammad Javad Rezaei (IRI)	5

Bronze medal match
Tüvshinbaataryn Borgil (MGL)	0
Amanat Samat Uulu (KGZ)	10
Sultan Assetuly (KAZ)	5
Zhantoro Mirzaliev (KGZ)	11^{F}

==== Men's Greco-Roman 77 kg ====
Round of 16
Bai Amuguleng (CHN)	5
Ankit Gulia (IND)	1

Quarterfinals
Lee Kyeong-bin (KOR)	3
Bai Amuguleng (CHN)	8
Bekzat Orunkul Uulu (KGZ)	5^{F}
Aman Khokhar (IND)	3
Jason Baucas (PHI)	0
Stoyan Kubatov (BUL)	9
Noh Yeong-hun (KOR)	8
Tuuliin Ariyabadraa (MGL)	0

Semifinals
Bai Amuguleng (CHN)	7
Bekzat Orunkul Uulu (KGZ)	6
Stoyan Kubatov (BUL)	3
Noh Yeong-hun (KOR)	1

Final
Bai Amuguleng (CHN)	1
Stoyan Kubatov (BUL)	10

Repechage round 1
Ankit Gulia (IND)	9
Lee Kyeong-bin (KOR)	0

Bronze medal match
Ankit Gulia (IND)	0
Bekzat Orunkul Uulu (KGZ)	5^{F}
Jason Baucas (PHI)	0
Noh Yeong-hun (KOR)	4^{F}

==== Men's Greco-Roman 82 kg ====
Pos	Athlete	Pld	W	L	CP	TP	BUL	MGL	MGL
1	Deyvid Dimitrov (BUL)	2	2	0	8	17	—	9–0	8–0
2	Dashjamtsiin Lkhagvasüren (MGL)	2	1	1	3	3	0–4 SU	—	3–1
3	Nyam-Erdeniin Orgil (MGL)	2	0	2	1	1	0–4 SU	1–3 PO1	—

Source: UWW

Pos	Athlete	Pld	W	L	CP	TP	BUL	KGZ	MGL
1	Aik Mnatsakanian (BUL)	2	2	0	7	14	—	5–3	9–1
2	Imur Temirbekov (KGZ)	2	1	1	5	13	1–3 PO1	—	10–0
3	Enkhbayaryn Törbold (MGL)	2	0	2	1	1	1–4 SU1	0–4 SU	—

Source: UWW

Semifinals
Deyvid Dimitrov (BUL)	9
Imur Temirbekov (KGZ)	1
Aik Mnatsakanian (BUL)	9
Dashjamtsiin Lkhagvasüren (MGL)	0

Final
Deyvid Dimitrov (BUL)	5
Aik Mnatsakanian (BUL)	5
Third place
Imur Temirbekov (KGZ)	9
Dashjamtsiin Lkhagvasüren (MGL)	0

==== Men's Greco-Roman 87 kg ====
Round of 16
Lee Seung-hwan (KOR)	5^{F}
Rohit Bura (IND)	0

Quarterfinals
Tsogtbaataryn Batbayar (MGL)	0
Lee Seung-hwan (KOR)	9
Azat Salidinov (KGZ)	9
Baatarkhüügiin Ösökhbayar (MGL)	0
Luis Avendaño (VEN)	10
Prince Pahalwan (IND)	0
Sunil Kumar (IND)	WO
~~Ganboldyn Törbold (MGL)~~

Semifinals
Lee Seung-hwan (KOR)	0
Azat Salidinov (KGZ)	9
Luis Avendaño (VEN)	1
Sunil Kumar (IND)	3

Final
Azat Salidinov (KGZ)	1
Sunil Kumar (IND)	4

Bronze medal match
Baatarkhüügiin Ösökhbayar (MGL)	1
Lee Seung-hwan (KOR)	10
~~Ganboldyn Törbold (MGL)~~
Luis Avendaño (VEN)	WO

==== Men's Greco-Roman 97 kg ====
Quarterfinals		Semifinals		Final
Nitesh Siwach (IND)	3
Juan Díaz (VEN)	1	Nitesh Siwach (IND)	4
Pürevdorjiin Batsuuri (MGL)	0	Ganbaataryn Gankhuyag (MGL)	1
Ganbaataryn Gankhuyag (MGL)	8^{F}			Nitesh Siwach (IND)	13
Lee Min-ho (KOR)	2			Nurassyl Amanaly (KAZ)	9
Adiya (CHN)	2	Lee Min-ho (KOR)	4
Erdenejargalyn Tüvshinsanaa (MGL)	0	Nurassyl Amanaly (KAZ)	10^{F}
Nurassyl Amanaly (KAZ)	5^{F}

Bronze medals
Juan Díaz (VEN)	3
Ganbaataryn Gankhuyag (MGL)	5^{F}
Erdenejargalyn Tüvshinsanaa (MGL)	3
Lee Min-ho (KOR)	12

==== Men's Greco-Roman 130 kg ====
Pos	Athlete	Pld	W	L	CP	TP	KAZ	IND	VEN	MGL
1	Olzhas Syrlybay (KAZ)	3	3	0	13	20	—	3–0 Fall	9–0	8–0
2	Joginder Rathee (IND)	3	2	1	7	14	0–5 FA	—	3–0	11–0
3	Moisés Pérez (VEN)	3	1	2	3	6	0–4 SU	0–3 PO	—	6–4
4	Mönkhdorjiin Lkhagvajamts (MGL)	3	0	3	1	4	0–4 SU	0–4 SU	1–3 PO1	—

Source: UWW

Pos	Athlete	Pld	W	L	CP	TP	KOR	MGL	CHN
1	Kim Min-seok (KOR)	2	2	0	7	11	—	3–1	8–0
2	Batbayaryn Nambardagva (MGL)	2	1	1	4	3	1–3 PO1	—	2–0
3	Dong Zhiyong (CHN)	2	0	2	0	0	0–4 SU	0–3 PO	—

Source: UWW

Semifinals
Olzhas Syrlybay (KAZ)	1
Batbayaryn Nambardagva (MGL)	2
Kim Min-seok (KOR)	9
Joginder Rathee (IND)	0

Final
Batbayaryn Nambardagva (MGL)	0
Kim Min-seok (KOR)	8
Bronze medal
Olzhas Syrlybay (KAZ)	10
Joginder Rathee (IND)	0

=== Women's freestyle ===
==== Women's freestyle 50 kg ====
Round of 16
Bao Anqi (CHN)	10
Maral Tangirbergenova (KAZ)	0
Cheon Mi-ran (KOR)	0
Byambasürengiin Mönkhnar (MGL)	11
Miyu Nakamura (JPN)	10
Mönkhbatyn Mönkhgerel (MGL)	7
Mercy Genesis (NGR)	2
Evin Demirhan Yavuz (TUR)	7

Quarterfinals
Bayarbaataryn Suvd-Erdene (MGL)	0
Bao Anqi (CHN)	10
Byambasürengiin Mönkhnar (MGL)	8
Neelam Sirohi (IND)	12
Sweety (IND)	0
Miyu Nakamura (JPN)	10
Evin Demirhan Yavuz (TUR)	0
Kim Son-hyang (PRK)	11

Semifinals
Bao Anqi (CHN)	5^{F}
Neelam Sirohi (IND)	2
Miyu Nakamura (JPN)	1
Kim Son-hyang (PRK)	4

Final
Bao Anqi (CHN)	0
Kim Son-hyang (PRK)	10

Repechage round
Maral Tangirbergenova (KAZ)	10
Bayarbaataryn Suvd-Erdene (MGL)	0

Bronze medals
Maral Tangirbergenova (KAZ)	0
Neelam Sirohi (IND)	10
Evin Demirhan Yavuz (TUR)	0
Miyu Nakamura (JPN)	4

==== Women's freestyle 53 kg ====
Round of 16
Alexa Álvarez (VEN)	6
Natia Svanidze (RUS)	4
Gankhuyagiin Tsovoo (MGL)	2
Christianah Ogunsanya (NGR)	13
Oh Kyong-ryong (PRK)	14
Tsogt-Ochiryn Namuuntsetseg (MGL)	4
Muskan (IND)	8^{F}
Naogugan (CHN)	2

Quarterfinals
Bayanmönkhiin Otgontuyaa (MGL)	8
Alexa Álvarez (VEN)	2
Christianah Ogunsanya (NGR)	0
Moe Kiyooka (JPN)	10
Meenakshi Goyat (IND)	0
Oh Kyong-ryong (PRK)	10
Muskan (IND)	6
Andreea Ana (ROU)	17

Semifinals
Bayanmönkhiin Otgontuyaa (MGL)	2
Moe Kiyooka (JPN)	4
Oh Kyong-ryong (PRK)	7
Andreea Ana (ROU)	6

Final
Moe Kiyooka (JPN)	6
Oh Kyong-ryong (PRK)	10

Repechage round
Tsogt-Ochiryn Namuuntsetseg (MGL)	4
Meenakshi Goyat (IND)	1

Bronze medals
Christianah Ogunsanya (NGR)	6
Bayanmönkhiin Otgontuyaa (MGL)	6
Tsogt-Ochiryn Namuuntsetseg (MGL)	0
Andreea Ana (ROU)	11^{F}

==== Women's freestyle 55 kg ====
Round of 16
Beatrice Ferenț (ROU)	0
Natsumi Masuda (JPN)	7^{F}

Quarterfinals
Laura Almaganbetova (KAZ)	2
Natsumi Masuda (JPN)	12
Tuba Demir (TUR)	12
Buyandalain Chimgee (MGL)	1
Tömörbaataryn Bayarjargal (MGL)	0
Odonchimegiin Ariunzayaa (MGL)	4^{F}
Hansika Lamba (IND)	0
Choe Hyo-gyong (PRK)	10

Semifinals
Natsumi Masuda (JPN)	14
Tuba Demir (TUR)	5
Odonchimegiin Ariunzayaa (MGL)	0
Choe Hyo-gyong (PRK)	10

Final
Natsumi Masuda (JPN)	0
Choe Hyo-gyong (PRK)	6^{F}

Repechage round 1
Beatrice Ferenț (ROU)	3
Laura Almaganbetova (KAZ)	5

Bronze medal match
Laura Almaganbetova (KAZ)	4
Tuba Demir (TUR)	8
Hansika Lamba (IND)	11
Odonchimegiin Ariunzayaa (MGL)	0

==== Women's freestyle 57 kg ====
Quarterfinals		Semifinals		Final
Kwon Young-jin (KOR)	6
Nilufar Raimova (KAZ)	9^{F}	Nilufar Raimova (KAZ)	0
Son Il-sim (PRK)	11	Son Il-sim (PRK)	4^{F}
Danielle Lim (SGP)	0			Son Il-sim (PRK)	1
Ürjingiin Mönkhchimeg (MGL)	0			Manisha Bhanwala (IND)	3^{F}
Elvira Süleyman Kamaloğlu (TUR)	11	Elvira Süleyman Kamaloğlu (TUR)	1
~~Batkhuyagiin Khulan (MGL)~~		Manisha Bhanwala (IND)	6
Manisha Bhanwala (IND)	WO

Bronze medals
Danielle Lim (SGP)	0
Nilufar Raimova (KAZ)	10
~~Batkhuyagiin Khulan (MGL)~~
Elvira Süleyman Kamaloğlu (TUR)	WO

==== Women's freestyle 59 kg ====
Pos	Athlete	Pld	W	L	CP	TP	IND	PRK	MGL	MGL
1	Neha Sangwan (IND)	3	3	0	11	30	—	10–2	10–0	10–0
2	Hong Pyol (PRK)	3	2	1	9	22	1–3 PO1	—	10–0	10–0
3	Erdenebilegiin Saruul (MGL)	3	1	2	5	6	0–4 SU	0–4 SU	—	6–0 Fall
4	Baljinnyamyn Enkhtüvshin (MGL)	3	0	3	0	0	0–4 SU	0–4 SU	0–5 FA	—

Source: UWW

Pos	Athlete	Pld	W	L	CP	TP	MGL	TUR	RUS
1	Khürelkhüügiin Bolortuyaa (MGL)	2	2	0	10	16	—	8–2 Fall	8–0 Fall
2	Bediha Gün (TUR)	2	1	1	4	12	0–5 FA	—	10–0
3	Eleonora Useinova (RUS)	2	0	2	0	0	0–5 FA	0–4 SU	—

Source: UWW

Semifinals
Neha Sangwan (IND)	7
Bediha Gün (TUR)	0
Khürelkhüügiin Bolortuyaa (MGL)	0
Hong Pyol (PRK)	11

Final
Neha Sangwan (IND)	5
Hong Pyol (PRK)	3
Bronze medal
Bediha Gün (TUR)	1
Khürelkhüügiin Bolortuyaa (MGL)	4^{F}

==== Women's freestyle 62 kg ====
Round of 16
Sükheegiin Tserenchimed (MGL)	0
Astrid Montero (VEN)	4^{F}
Ekaterina Oleinikova (RUS)	0
Nitika (IND)	2
Jo Su-been (KOR)	0
Bilyana Dudova (BUL)	11
Esther Kolawole (NGR)	6
Amina Tandelova (RUS)	0
Togtokhyn Altjin (MGL)	9
Amina Capezan (ROU)	0

Quarterfinals
Mansi Ahlawat (IND)	12
Astrid Montero (VEN)	2
Nitika (IND)	2
Bilyana Dudova (BUL)	4
Kim Ok-ju (PRK)	5
Esther Kolawole (NGR)	4
Togtokhyn Altjin (MGL)	0
Yang Huan (CHN)	4^{F}

Semifinals
Mansi Ahlawat (IND)	4
Bilyana Dudova (BUL)	6
Kim Ok-ju (PRK)	10
Yang Huan (CHN)	0

Final
Bilyana Dudova (BUL)	0
Kim Ok-ju (PRK)	10

Repechage round
Jo Su-been (KOR)	0
Nitika (IND)	5^{F}

Bronze medals
Nitika (IND)	0
Mansi Ahlawat (IND)	10
Esther Kolawole (NGR)	10
Yang Huan (CHN)	0

==== Women's freestyle 65 kg ====
Pos	Athlete	Pld	W	L	CP	TP	PRK	IND	MGL
1	Mun Hyon-gyong (PRK)	2	2	0	8	20	—	10–0	10–0
2	Pulkit Kandola (IND)	2	1	1	3	4	0–4 SU	—	4–2
3	Nyamsürengiin Narkhajid (MGL)	2	0	2	1	2	0–4 SU	1–3 PO1	—

Source: UWW

Pos	Athlete	Pld	W	L	CP	TP	CHN	MGL	MGL
1	Zhang Shuai (CHN)	2	2	0	10	6	—	4–1 Fall	2–0 Fall
2	Tüvshinjargalyn Enkhjin (MGL)	2	1	1	5	11	0–5 FA	—	10–0 Fall
3	Lkhagvasürengiin Erdenebulgan (MGL)	2	0	2	0	0	0–5 FA	0–5 FA	—

Source: UWW

Semifinals
Mun Hyon-gyong (PRK)	5
Tüvshinjargalyn Enkhjin (MGL)	3
Zhang Shuai (CHN)	6^{F}
Pulkit Kandola (IND)	4

Final
Mun Hyon-gyong (PRK)	14
Zhang Shuai (CHN)	2
Third place
Tüvshinjargalyn Enkhjin (MGL)	6
Pulkit Kandola (IND)	3

==== Women's freestyle 68 kg ====
Round of 16
Nathaly Grimán (VEN)	9
Kateryna Zelenykh (ROU)	12

Quarterfinals
Enkhsaikhany Delgermaa (MGL)	8
Kateryna Zelenykh (ROU)	0
Pak Sol-gum (PRK)	WO
~~Irina Kazyulina (KAZ)~~
Elizaveta Petliakova (RUS)	8
Batsükhiin Gantsetseg (MGL)	3
Nesrin Baş (TUR)	10
Erdenebatyn Odzayaa (MGL)	0

Semifinals
Enkhsaikhany Delgermaa (MGL)	7
Pak Sol-gum (PRK)	3
Elizaveta Petliakova (RUS)	9
Nesrin Baş (TUR)	8

Final
Enkhsaikhany Delgermaa (MGL)	8
Elizaveta Petliakova (RUS)	2

Bronze medal match
Kateryna Zelenykh (ROU)	6^{F}
Pak Sol-gum (PRK)	0
Batsükhiin Gantsetseg (MGL)	4
Nesrin Baş (TUR)	4^{F}

==== Women's freestyle 72 kg ====
Pos	Athlete	Pld	W	L	CP	TP	POL	MGL	MGL	IND
1	Wiktoria Chołuj (POL)	3	3	0	14	28	—	11–0	11–0 Fall	6–0 Fall
2	Zorigtyn Bolortungalag (MGL)	3	2	1	8	18	0–4 SU	—	8–0 Fall	10–4
3	Myagmarsürengiin Batsüren (MGL)	3	1	2	5	5	0–5 FA	0–5 FA	—	5–5 Fall
4	Harshita Mor (IND)	3	0	3	1	9	0–5 FA	1–3 PO1	0–5 FA	—

Source: UWW

Pos	Athlete	Pld	W	L	CP	TP	KAZ	MGL	RUS
1	Zhamila Bakbergenova (KAZ)	2	2	0	8	12	—	4–2	8–4 Fall
2	Erdene-Ochiryn Odgerel (MGL)	2	1	1	4	12	1–3 PO1	—	10–4
3	Olesia Bezuglova (RUS)	2	0	2	1	8	0–5 FA	1–3 PO1	—

Source: UWW

Semifinals
Wiktoria Chołuj (POL)	10
Erdene-Ochiryn Odgerel (MGL)	0
Zhamila Bakbergenova (KAZ)	2
Zorigtyn Bolortungalag (MGL)	6

Final
Wiktoria Chołuj (POL)	12
Zorigtyn Bolortungalag (MGL)	2
Bronze medal
Erdene-Ochiryn Odgerel (MGL)	WO
Zhamila Bakbergenova (KAZ)

==== Women's freestyle 76 kg ====
Round of 16
Alexandra Anghel (ROU)	2
Taravyn Tüvshinjargal (MGL)	5
Gan-Ochiryn Urtnasan (MGL)	6
Patrycja Cuber (POL)	2
Wang Xinyan (CHN)	0
Priya Malik (IND)	10
Kajal Dhochak (IND)	7^{F}
Gulmaral Yerkebayeva (KAZ)	1
Hwang Eun-ju (KOR)	0
Enkh-Amaryn Davaanasan (MGL)	4

Quarterfinals
Damola Ojo (NGR)	10
Taravyn Tüvshinjargal (MGL)	0
Gan-Ochiryn Urtnasan (MGL)	0
Priya Malik (IND)	10
Ao Saihan (CHN)	1
Kajal Dhochak (IND)	12
Enkh-Amaryn Davaanasan (MGL)	1
Elmira Syzdykova (KAZ)	6

Semifinals
Damola Ojo (NGR)	5
Priya Malik (IND)	1
Kajal Dhochak (IND)	9^{F}
Elmira Syzdykova (KAZ)	1

Final
Damola Ojo (NGR)	0
Kajal Dhochak (IND)	8

Repechage round
Gulmaral Yerkebayeva (KAZ)	10
Ao Saihan (CHN)	0

Bronze medals
Taravyn Tüvshinjargal (MGL)	0
Priya Malik (IND)	8
Gulmaral Yerkebayeva (KAZ)	3
Elmira Syzdykova (KAZ)	7
