= Mohammad Nokhodi =

Iranian wrestler (born 2001)

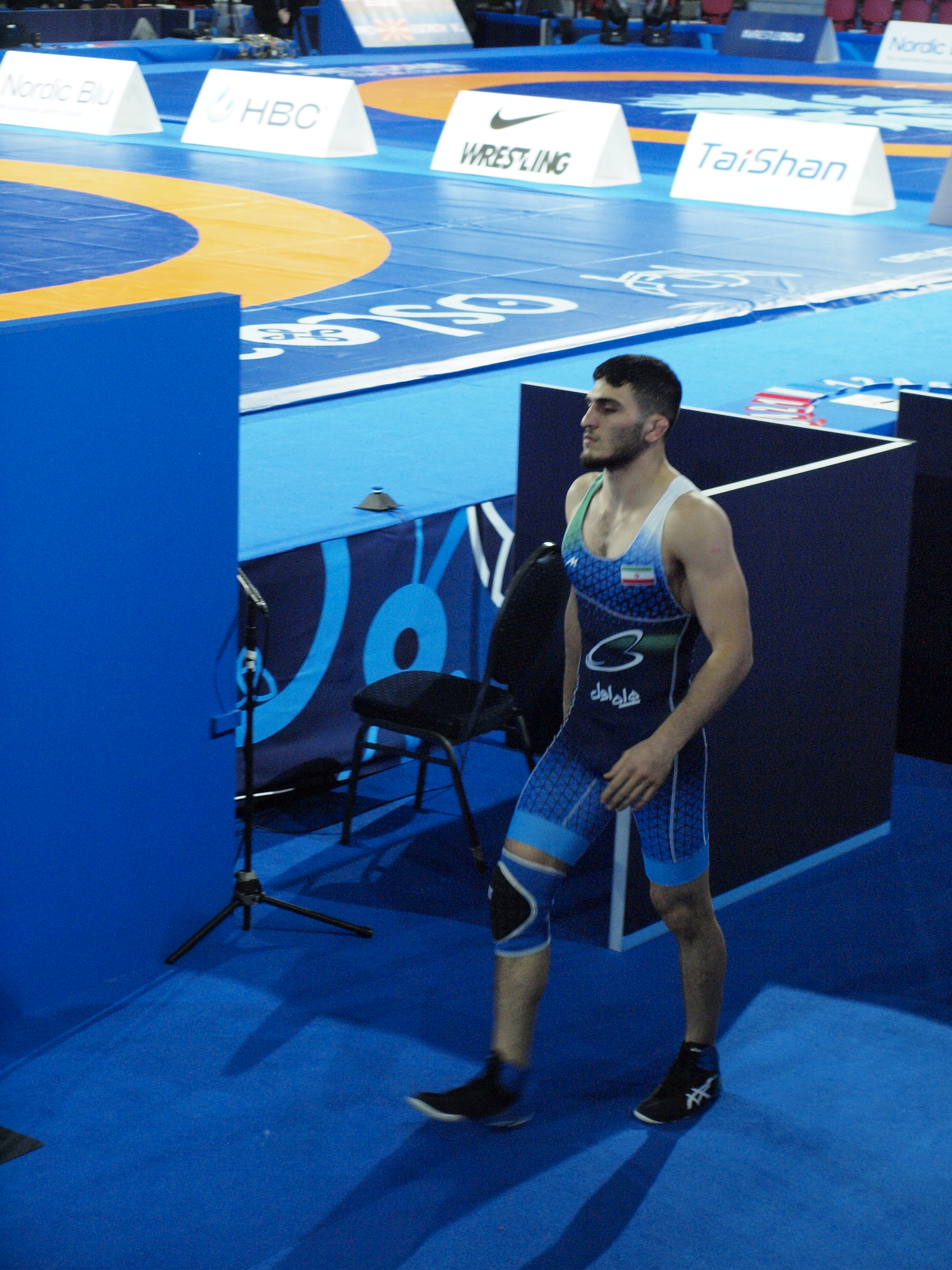
- Mohammad Nokhodi at the 2021 World Wrestling Championships in Oslo, Norway

Personal information
- Native name: محمد نخودی
- Full name: Mohammad Ashghar Nokhodilarimi
- Nationality: Iran
- Born: Mohammad Nokhodi; 7 February 2001 (age 25) Juybar, Mazandaran, Iran
- Height: 187 cm (6 ft 2 in)

Sport
- Country: Iran
- Sport: Wrestling
- Weight class: 79 kg
- Event: Freestyle

Achievements and titles
- World finals: (silver) (2021) (silver) (2022 (silver) (2026) (bronze) (2023) (bronze) (2024) (bronze) (2025)
- Regional finals: (gold) (2024) (bronze) (2019)
Medal record
Men's freestyle wrestling
Representing Iran
World Championships
Silver medal – second place	2021 Oslo	79 kg
Silver medal – second place	2022 Belgrade	79 kg
Silver medal – second place	2024 Tirana	79 kg
Silver medal – second place	2026 Astana	79 kg
Bronze medal – third place	2023 Belgrade	79 kg
Bronze medal – third place	2025 Zagreb	79 kg
Asian Games
Gold medal – first place	2026 Aichi–Nagoya	86 kg
Asian Championships
Gold medal – first place	2024 Bishkek	79 kg
Bronze medal – third place	2019 Xi'an	74 kg
World Cup
Silver medal – second place	2022 Coralville	Team
Yasar Dogu Tournament
Gold medal – first place	2021 Istanbul	79 kg
Grand Prix
Gold medal – first place	2022 Tunisia	79 kg
Gold medal – first place	2023 Budapest	79 kg
Gold medal – first place	2024 Zagreb	79 kg
Gold medal – first place	2026 Tirana	79 kg
Gold medal – first place	2026 Ulaanbaatar	86 kg
World Junior Championships
Gold medal – first place	2021 Ufa	79 kg
U23 World Championships
Silver medal – second place	2019 Budapest	74 kg
Cadet World Championships
Bronze medal – third place	2017 Athens	69 kg
Cadet Asian Championships
Gold medal – first place	2018 Tashkent	71 kg

Mohammad Nokhodi (Persian: محمد نخودی; born 3 February 2001 in Mazandaran, Iran) is an Iranian wrestler.

He won two silver medal in World Wrestling Championships 2021 and 2022.

He won the gold medal in his event at the 2024 Asian Wrestling Championships held in Bishkek, Kyrgyzstan.
