= Olonbayaryn Süldkhüü =

Mongolian freestyle wrestler (born 2001)

Personal information
- Native name: Олонбаярын Сүлдхүү
- Nationality: Mongolia
- Born: 2001 (age 24–25) Jargalant, Arkhangai, Mongolia
- Height: 174 cm (5 ft 9 in)

Sport
- Country: Mongolia
- Sport: Wrestling
- Weight class: 79 kg
- Event: Freestyle

Achievements and titles
- World finals: 5th(2024) 5th(2025)
- Regional finals: (bronze) (2023) (bronze) (2025)
Medal record
Men's freestyle wrestling
Representing Mongolia
Asian Games
Bronze medal – third place	2026 Aichi–Nagoya	86 kg
Asian Championships
Bronze medal – third place	2023 Astana	74 kg
Bronze medal – third place	2025 Amman	79 kg
Bronze medal – third place	2026 Bishkek	79 kg
Grand Prix
Bronze medal – third place	2026 Ulaanbaatar	79 kg
Gold medal – first place	2026 Budapest	79 kg
World Military Championships
Gold medal – first place	2024 Yerevan	79 kg
Bronze medal – third place	2023 Baku	79 kg
Khadartsev Brothers Cup
Gold medal – first place	2025 Vladikavkaz	79 kg

Olonbayaryn Süldkhüü (Mongolian: Олонбаярын Сүлдхүү, born 2001) is a Mongolian freestyle wrestler who competes in the 74–79 kg weight classes.

== Career ==
Süldkhüü won the bronze medal in the 74 kg event at the 2023 Asian Wrestling Championships in Astana, Kazakhstan.

He won the bronze medal in the 79 kg event at 2023 World Military Wrestling Championships, held in Baku, Azerbaijan.

Süldkhüü won the winner title in the 79 kg event at the 2024 World Military Wrestling Championships held in Yerevan, Armenia, defeating 2022 Russian North Caucasian Federal District Champion Mohamad Nasirkhaev 7-0.

He won the bronze medal in the 79 kg event at the 2025 Asian Wrestling Championships held in Amman, Jordan.

Süldkhüü won the gold medal in the 79 kg event at the 2025 Khadartsev Brothers Cup, held in Vladikavkaz, Russian North Ossetia–Alania, with wins over Abdulla Sharapudinov (6-2), 2021 U-20 World Beach Wrestling Champion Jabbarov Farid (3-0), 2018 Dmitri Korkin Tournament and 2019 U-23 European Champion Nikita Suchkov (6-4), and 2019 U-20 European champion Dmitri Kuprin (2-0) who had beaten 2024 World Champion Magomed Magomaev (9-6).

Süldkhüü beat 2023 World Champion Akhmed Usmanov, who was also the reigning European and Russian National Champion, with a score of 3-0 in the 79 kg event at the PWL-10 which was held 8 November 2025 in Moscow, Russia.

He won the 2026 Polyák Imre & Varga János Memorial Tournament in the 79 kg event, defeating multiple U23 European and U20 World Champion Dzhabrail Gadzhiev 5-0.

Süldkhüü won the bronze medal in the 86 kg event at the 2026 Asian Games held in Aichi–Nagoya, Japan, defeating multiple World Championships medalist and Asian Champion Azamat Dauletbekov 5-3.

At the 2026 World Championships in the 79 kg event, Süldkhüü placing fifth, even though he lost on criteria after a 3-3 tie with reigning two-time NCAA Champion Levi Haines, who claimed the World Championship title thanks to flawless victories in his other matches.
