= Muhammet Emin Çakır =

Turkish Greco-Roman wrestler

Personal information
- Nationality: Turkey
- Born: January 1, 2003 (age 23) Gaziantep, Turkey
- Education: Aydın Adnan Menderes University
- Height: 1.67 m (5 ft 6 in)
- Weight: 55 kg (121 lb)

Sport
- Sport: Wrestling
- Event: Greco-Roman wrestling
- Club: İzmir Büyükşehir Belediyespor
Medal record
Representing Turkey
Grand Prix
Bronze medal – third place	2026 Ulaanbaatar	55 kg
Vehbi Emre & Hamit Kaplan Tournament
Gold medal – first place	2025 Kocaeli	55 kg
Dan Kolov & Nikola Petrov Tournament
Silver medal – second place	2026 Plovdiv	55 kg
FISU World Cup
Gold medal – first place	2022 Samsun	55 kg
European U23 Championships
Bronze medal – third place	2024 Baku	55 kg

Muhammet Emin Çakır (born 2003) is a Turkish Greco-Roman wrestler who competes in the 55 kg division. He represents İzmir Büyükşehir Belediyespor and the Turkish national team in international competitions.

== Career ==
In 2023, Çakır won a bronze medal in the 55 kg Greco-Roman event at the European U23 Wrestling Championships held in Bucharest. He won against Georgian wrestler Giorgi Tokhadze, lost to Armenian wrestler Karapet Manvelyan, and won again against Serbian wrestler Sabolc Losonc.

In June 2025, Çakır claimed the gold medal in the 55 kg category at the 2025 Vehbi Emre & Hamit Kaplan Tournament in Kocaeli, one of the most significant achievements of his career. The final match, which pitted him against Indian wrestler Anil Mor, ended with a 1-1 score.

In September 2025, Çakır won the Senior World Championship held in Zagreb, Croatia.

In December 2025, Çakır achieved the title of "Türkiye Champion" at the Senior Türkiye Wrestling Championship in Gaziantep, held from December 7 to 12, and he was accordingly congratulated by a rector professor from his alma mater Aydın Adnan Menderes University.
