= 2026 World Wrestling Championships – Men's freestyle 79 kg =

Wrestling competitions

Men's freestyle 79 kg at the 2026 World Championships
- Venue: Barys Arena
- Dates: 31 October – 1 November 2026
- Competitors: 30 from 30 nations

Medalists
gold medal	Levi Haines	United States
silver medal	Mohammad Nokhodi	Iran
bronze medal	Mahamedkhabib Kadzimahamedau	Belarus
bronze medal	Ismail Khaniev	Russia

The men's freestyle 79 kilograms is a competition featured at the 2026 World Wrestling Championships, and was held in Astana, Kazakhstan on 31 October and 1 November 2026.

This freestyle wrestling competition consists of a single-elimination tournament, with a repechage used to determine the winner of two bronze medals. The two finalists face off for gold and silver medals. Each wrestler who loses to one of the two finalists moves into the repechage, culminating in a pair of bronze medal matches, featuring the semifinal losers each facing the remaining repechage opponent from their half of the bracket.

== Results ==
Legend

- F — Won by fall
- WO — Won by walkover

=== Final ===
Final
Mohammad Nokhodi (IRI)	3
Levi Haines (USA)	4

=== Top half ===
Round of 32
~~JR Bremen Leban (MHL)~~
Erzo Isakov (JOR)	WO
Zhakshylyk Baitashov (KGZ)	5
Rasul Shapiev (MKD)	4
Okan Tahtacı (TUR)	8
Achsarbek Gulajev (SVK)	4
Mahamedkhabib Kadzimahamedau (BLR)	12
Mirzo Khayitov (UZB)	1
Abdelkader Ikkal (ALG)	2
Shamsat Tair (KAZ)	10
Alans Amirovs (LAT)	7
Lee Sung-ho (KOR)	2
Somonjon Ikromov (TJK)	0
Mohammad Nokhodi (IRI)	10

Round of 16
Dzhabrail Gadzhiev (AZE)	11
Erzo Isakov (JOR)	0
Zhakshylyk Baitashov (KGZ)	0
Okan Tahtacı (TUR)	7
Mahamedkhabib Kadzimahamedau (BLR)	12
Shamsat Tair (KAZ)	2
Alans Amirovs (LAT)	2
Mohammad Nokhodi (IRI)	12

Quarterfinals
Dzhabrail Gadzhiev (AZE)	9
Okan Tahtacı (TUR)	3
Mahamedkhabib Kadzimahamedau (BLR)	4
Mohammad Nokhodi (IRI)	6

Semifinals
Dzhabrail Gadzhiev (AZE)	5
Mohammad Nokhodi (IRI)	9

=== Bottom half ===
Round of 32
Levi Haines (USA)	5^{F}
Mohammed Amine Bouazouni (MAR)	0
Connor Church (CAN)	0
Szymon Wojtkowski (POL)	10
Ismail Khaniev (RUS)	11
Hrayr Alikhanyan (ARM)	0
Lilian Balan (MDA)	1
Luka Chkhitunidze (GEO)	4
Mikey Labriola (PUR)	9
Cesar Alvan (BRA)	10
Lu Feng (CHN)	9
Saurabh Yadav (IND)	12
Mathayo Mahabila (KEN)	0
Bohdan Oliinyk (UKR)	8^{F}

Round of 16
Levi Haines (USA)	10
Szymon Wojtkowski (POL)	0
Ismail Khaniev (RUS)	10
Luka Chkhitunidze (GEO)	0
Cesar Alvan (BRA)	21
Saurabh Yadav (IND)	18
Bohdan Oliinyk (UKR)	0
Olonbayaryn Süldkhüü (MGL)	5

Quarterfinals
Levi Haines (USA)	8
Ismail Khaniev (RUS)	1
Cesar Alvan (BRA)	2
Olonbayaryn Süldkhüü (MGL)	9

Semifinals
Levi Haines (USA)	3
Olonbayaryn Süldkhüü (MGL)	3

=== Repechage ===
Repechage round 1
Somonjon Ikromov (TJK)	3
Alans Amirovs (LAT)	4
Mohammed Amine Bouazouni (MAR)	0
Szymon Wojtkowski (POL)	10^{F}

Repechage round 2
Alans Amirovs (LAT)	1
Mahamedkhabib Kadzimahamedau (BLR)	6
Szymon Wojtkowski (POL)	0
Ismail Khaniev (RUS)	10

Bronze medals
Mahamedkhabib Kadzimahamedau (BLR)	3
Dzhabrail Gadzhiev (AZE)	0
Ismail Khaniev (RUS)	6
Olonbayaryn Süldkhüü (MGL)	0

== Final standing ==
Rank	Athlete
1st place, gold medalist(s)	Levi Haines (USA)
2nd place, silver medalist(s)	Mohammad Nokhodi (IRI)
3rd place, bronze medalist(s)	Mahamedkhabib Kadzimahamedau (BLR)
3rd place, bronze medalist(s)	Ismail Khaniev (RUS)
5	Dzhabrail Gadzhiev (AZE)
5	Olonbayaryn Süldkhüü (MGL)
7	Szymon Wojtkowski (POL)
8	Alans Amirovs (LAT)
9	Cesar Alvan (BRA)
10	Okan Tahtacı (TUR)
11	Bohdan Oliinyk (UKR)
12	Erzo Isakov (JOR)
13	Saurabh Yadav (IND)
14	Shamsat Tair (KAZ)
15	Zhakshylyk Baitashov (KGZ)
16	Luka Chkhitunidze (GEO)
17	Mikey Labriola (PUR)
18	Lu Feng (CHN)
19	Rasul Shapiev (MKD)
20	Achsarbek Gulajev (SVK)
21	Somonjon Ikromov (TJK)
22	Lee Sung-ho (KOR)
23	Abdelkader Ikkal (ALG)
24	Lilian Balan (MDA)
25	Mirzo Khayitov (UZB)
26	Mathayo Mahabila (KEN)
27	Connor Church (CAN)
28	Hrayr Alikhanyan (ARM)
29	Mohammed Amine Bouazouni (MAR)
—	JR Bremen Leban (MHL)
