= Kaisei Tanabe =

Japanese wrestler

Personal information
- Born: 10 July 2002 (age 24) Tokyo, Japan

Sport
- Country: Japan
- Sport: Wrestling
- Weight class: 65 kg
- Event: Freestyle

Achievements and titles
- Regional finals: (gold) (2025)
Medal record
Men's Freestyle wrestling
Representing Japan
Asian Championships
Gold medal – first place	2025 Amman	65 kg
Dan Kolov & Nikola Petrov Tournament
Bronze medal – third place	2023 Sofia	61 kg
World Cadet Championships
Bronze medal – third place	2017 Athens	42 kg
Men's Greco-Roman wrestling
Representing Japan
Asian Championships
Bronze medal – third place	2026 Bishkek	63 kg

Kaisei Tanabe (田南部 魁星, Tanabe Kaisei; born 10 July 2002) is a Japanese freestyle wrestler.

== Career ==
In March 2025, Tanabe won the gold medal in the men's 65 kg category at the 2025 Asian Wrestling Championships in Amman, Jordan. He defeated Mongolia’s Tsogbadrakh Tseveensuren with a 12–2 score in the final.

He also earned a bronze medal at the 2017 Cadet World Wrestling Championships.

Kaisei Tanabe is the son of Chikara Tanabe, who won an Olympic bronze medal in Greco-Roman wrestling at the 2004 Athens Olympics. Kaisei started wrestling at the age of 4 and eventually transitioned into freestyle, where he gained international success.
