= Won Myong-gyong =

North Korean freestyle wrestler (born 2000)

Personal information
- Nationality: North Korea
- Born: 1 January 2000 (age 26) North Korea

Sport
- Sport: Sport wrestling
- Event: Freestyle

Korean name
- Hangul: 원명경
- RR: Won Myeonggyeong
- MR: Wŏn Myŏnggyŏng
Medal record
Women's freestyle wrestling
Wrestling World Championships
Gold medal – first place	2025 Zagreb	50 kg
Asian Wrestling Championships
Bronze medal – third place	2025 Amman	50 kg

Won Myong-gyong (Korean: 원명경; born 1 January 2000) is a North Korean freestyle wrestler who competes in 50 kg division. She is an Asian Championships bronze medalist and World Championship gold medalist.

== Career ==
Won gained prominence in the youth and junior categories, in which she won a gold medal in the Cadet Asian Championships in 2016 and later a bronze medal at the Asian Juniors Championships in 2019.

In March 2025, Won competed in the Asian Wrestling Championships held in Amman, Jordan in her category. She was eliminated by Remina Yoshimoto in the semi-finals but won her bronze medal bout by defeating Cheon Mi-ran. Six months later, at the World Wrestling Championships held in Zagreb, Croatia, Won competed in the 50 kg category. After defeating eventual bronze medalist Elizaveta Smirnova in the opening round, she defeated Svetlana Ankicheva in the round of 16, Madison Parks in the quarterfinals, Yoshimoto in the semifinals and Zhang Yu in the finals en route to winning the gold medal.
