= Oh Kyong-ryong =

North Korean wrestler (born 1998)

Personal information
- Born: 11 March 1998 (age 28) North Korea
- Height: 1.60 m (5 ft 3 in)
- Weight: 55 kg (121 lb; 8.7 st)

Sport
- Country: North Korea
- Sport: Freestyle
- Event: 55 kg
Medal record
Women's freestyle wrestling
Representing North Korea
World Championships
Gold medal – first place	2025 Zagreb	55 kg
Asian Championships
Gold medal – first place	2025 Amman	55 kg
Silver medal – second place	2024 Bishkek	55 kg
Golden Grand Prix Ivan Yarygin
Silver medal – second place	2026 Krasnoyarsk	53 kg
Asian Cadet Championships
Gold medal – first place	2015 New Delhi	49 kg

Oh Kyong-ryong (11 March 1998) is a North Korean freestyle wrestler competing in the 55 kg division. She won the gold medal at the 2025 Asian Wrestling Championships.

== Career ==
In the 2025 Asian Wrestling Championships held in Amman, Jordan, she reached the final by defeating Kyrgyz Aruuke Kadyrbek Kyzy with a 13-2 technical superiority in the first round, Japanese Haruna Okuno 6–5 in the quarterfinals and Uzbek Dilshoda Matnazarova 6–0 in the semifinals. She won the gold medal by defeating Chinese Li Yuxuan 8–1 in the final match.
