= Sunil Kumar (wrestler) =

Indian greco-roman wrestler (born 1999)

Personal information
- Born: 29 September 1999 (age 27) Dabarpur, Haryana, India
- Occupation: Chief Ticket Inspector
- Employer: Indian Railways

Sport
- Sport: Wrestling
- Weight class: 87 kg
- Event: Greco-Roman
Medal record
Men's Greco-Roman wrestling
Representing India
Asian Games
Bronze medal – third place	2022 Hangzhou	87 kg
Bronze medal – third place	2026 Aichi–Nagoya	87 kg
Asian Championships
Gold medal – first place	2020 New Delhi	87 kg
Silver medal – second place	2019 Xi'an	87 kg
Bronze medal – third place	2022 Ulaanbaatar	87 kg
Bronze medal – third place	2023 Astana	87 kg
Bronze medal – third place	2025 Amman	87 kg
Bronze medal – third place	2026 Bishkek	87 kg
Grand Prix
Gold medal – first place	2022 Tunis	87 kg
Gold medal – first place	2026 Ulaanbaatar	87 kg
Silver medal – second place	2020 Rome	87 kg
Commonwealth Championships
Gold medal – first place	2017 Johannesburg	87 kg
U23 Asian Championships
Gold medal – first place	2022 Bishkek	87 kg
U20 Asian Championships
Bronze medal – third place	2017 Taichung	84 kg
Bronze medal – third place	2018 New Delhi	87 kg
Bronze medal – third place	2019 Chon Buri	87 kg
U17 Asian Championships
Silver medal – second place	2016 Taichung	85 kg

Sunil Kumar (born 29 September 1999) is an Indian greco-roman wrestler who competes in the men's 87 kg category. In recognition of his contributions to the Indian Greco-Roman wrestling, he was conferred with the Arjuna Award in 2023.
