= Aheiyou Tuerxun =

Chinese freestyle wrestler (born 2000)

Personal information
- Nationality: China

Sport
- Sport: Wrestling
- Event: Freestyle
Medal record
Asian Wrestling Championships
Bronze medal – third place	2025 Amman	74 kg

Aheiyou Tuerxun is a Chinese freestyle wrestler. He competed at the 2025 Asian Wrestling Championships, winning the bronze medal in the 74 kg event.
