= Khidir Saipudinov =

Russia born Bahraini freestyle wrestler (born 2003)

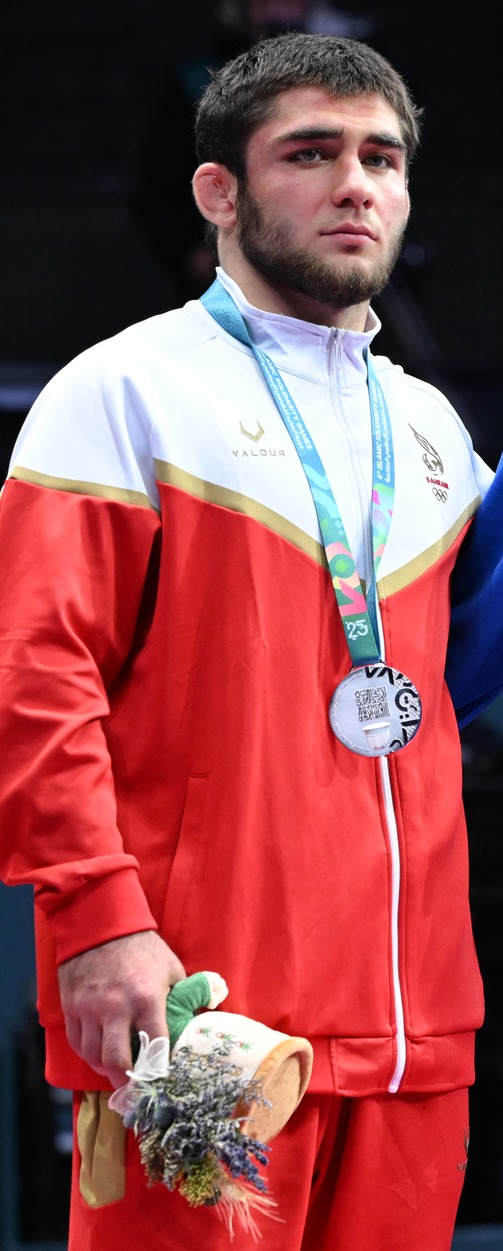
- Saipudinov in 2025

Personal information
- Full name: Khidir Kurbanovich Saipudinov
- Born: Хидир Курбанович Сайпудинов; 3 May 2003 (age 23) Dagestan, Russia
- Height: 1.85 m (6 ft 1 in)
- Weight: 86 kg (190 lb; 13.5 st)

Sport
- Country: Russia (2019–2021); Bahrain (2022–present)
- Sport: Amateur wrestling
- Weight class: 86 kg
- Event: Freestyle
- Club: Abdulrashid Sadulaev Wrestling Club
- Coached by: Shamil Omarov

Achievements and titles
- Regional finals: (bronze) (2024)
Medal record
Men's freestyle wrestling
Representing Bahrain
World Championships
Bronze medal – third place	2025 Zagreb	79 kg
Asian Championships
Silver medal – second place	2025 Amman	79 kg
Bronze medal – third place	2024 Bishkek	79 kg
Bronze medal – third place	2026 Bishkek	86 kg
Islamic Solidarity Games
Silver medal – second place	2025 Riyadh	86 kg
Yasar Dogu Tournament
Gold medal – first place	2024 Antalya	79 kg
Grand Prix
Silver medal – second place	2023 Bishkek	79 kg
Bronze medal – third place	2022 Taraz	79 kg
Arab Championships
Silver medal – second place	2022 Alexandria	86 kg

Khidir Saipudinov (Russian: Хидир Курбанович Сайпудинов; born 3 May 2003) is a Russian-born Bahraini wrestler.

== Career ==
At the end of January 2021, he took 5th place at the Dagestan Youth Championship in Kaspiysk. On 6 March 2021 in Khasavyurt won a bronze medal at the SCFD Youth Championships. On 21 January 2022 in Khasavyurt he became the bronze medallist of the Dagestan Junior Championship in memory of A. Karapetyan and Magomed Ramazanov. In March 2022 in Kaspiysk, he won bronze at the Russian Junior Championship in memory of Hero of Russia Nurmagomed Gadzhimagomedov.

He has been competing for Bahrain since autumn 2022, making his debut at the Dinmuhamed Kunayev Memorial International Tournament in Taraz, Kazakhstan, in early November 2022, where he won a bronze medal. A few days later with Bahrain's national team in Egypt, he finished second at the Arab Championships. In early June 2023, Saipudinov won silver at the UWW ranking tournament in Bishkek, and in mid-June 2023 in Yerevan, he won the Stepan Sarkisian Cup international tournament.

In March 2024, he won the Yaşar Dogu international tournament in Antalya. He won one of the bronze medals in his event at the 2024 Asian Wrestling Championships held in Bishkek, Kyrgyzstan. He competed at the 2024 World Wrestling Olympic Qualification Tournament held in Istanbul, Turkey without qualifying for the 2024 Summer Olympics in Paris, France.
