= 2025 Asian Wrestling Championships =

- Host city: Amman, Jordan
- Dates: 25–30 March 2025
- Stadium: Princess Sumaya Arena

Champions
- Freestyle: Iran
- Greco-Roman: Iran
- Women: Japan

The 2025 Asian Wrestling Championships was the 21st edition of Asian Wrestling Championships of combined events, and took place from 25 to 30 March in Amman, Jordan.

== Medal table ==
Rank	Nation	Gold	Silver	Bronze	Total
1	Iran	9	4	4	17
2	Japan	8	2	11	21
3	North Korea	4	5	4	13
4	Uzbekistan	3	2	2	7
5	Kazakhstan	2	4	5	11
6	Kyrgyzstan	2	2	3	7
7	China	1	3	10	14
8	India	1	3	6	10
9	Mongolia	0	2	7	9
10	Bahrain	0	1	2	3
11	Iraq	0	1	1	2
11	Tajikistan	0	1	1	2
13	South Korea	0	0	3	3
14	Qatar	0	0	1	1
Totals (14 entries)		30	30	60	120

== Team ranking ==
Rank	Men's freestyle		Men's Greco-Roman		Women's freestyle	
Rank	Team	Points	Team	Points	Team	Points
1	Iran	190	Iran	201	Japan	186
2	Japan	146	Uzbekistan	168	China	157
3	Kazakhstan	125	Japan	131	North Korea	155
4	Kyrgyzstan	116	Kazakhstan	98	Mongolia	126
5	Mongolia	101	China	97	India	116
6	India	85	Kyrgyzstan	77	Kazakhstan	98
7	China	71	South Korea	76	Kyrgyzstan	80
8	Uzbekistan	60	North Korea	70	South Korea	69
9	Bahrain	59	India	66	Uzbekistan	65
10	North Korea	55	Iraq	37	Chinese Taipei	36

== Medal summary ==
=== Men's freestyle ===
Event	Gold	Silver	Bronze
57 kg	Han Chong-song; North Korea	Milad Valizadeh; Iran	Rakhat Kalzhan; Kazakhstan
57 kg	Han Chong-song; North Korea	Milad Valizadeh; Iran	Batkhuyagiin Mönkh-Erdene; Mongolia
61 kg	Takara Suda; Japan	Udit Kumar; India	Ahmad Javan; Iran
61 kg	Takara Suda; Japan	Udit Kumar; India	Zou Wanhao; China
65 kg	Kaisei Tanabe; Japan	Kim Kwang-jin; North Korea	Taiyrbek Zhumashbek Uulu; Kyrgyzstan
65 kg	Kaisei Tanabe; Japan	Kim Kwang-jin; North Korea	Abbas Ebrahimzadeh; Iran
70 kg	Ernazar Akmataliev; Kyrgyzstan	Viktor Rassadin; Tajikistan	Yoshinosuke Aoyagi; Japan
70 kg	Ernazar Akmataliev; Kyrgyzstan	Viktor Rassadin; Tajikistan	Sina Khalili; Iran
74 kg	Nurkozha Kaipanov; Kazakhstan	Orozobek Toktomambetov; Kyrgyzstan	Aheiyou Tuerxun; China
74 kg	Nurkozha Kaipanov; Kazakhstan	Orozobek Toktomambetov; Kyrgyzstan	Magomedrasul Asluev; Bahrain
79 kg	Mehdi Yousefi; Iran	Khidir Saipudinov; Bahrain	Olonbayaryn Süldkhüü; Mongolia
79 kg	Mehdi Yousefi; Iran	Khidir Saipudinov; Bahrain	Magomet Evloev; Tajikistan
86 kg	Abolfazl Rahmani; Iran	Bolat Sakayev; Kazakhstan	Naadambatyn Batbilgüün; Mongolia
86 kg	Abolfazl Rahmani; Iran	Bolat Sakayev; Kazakhstan	Tatsuya Shirai; Japan
92 kg	Amir Hossein Firouzpour; Iran	Deepak Punia; India	Azamat Dauletbekov; Kazakhstan
92 kg	Amir Hossein Firouzpour; Iran	Deepak Punia; India	Takashi Ishiguro; Japan
97 kg	Arash Yoshida; Japan	Rizabek Aitmukhan; Kazakhstan	Mohammad Mobin Azimi; Iran
97 kg	Arash Yoshida; Japan	Rizabek Aitmukhan; Kazakhstan	Habila Awusayiman; China
125 kg	Amir Reza Masoumi; Iran	Mönkhtöriin Lkhagvagerel; Mongolia	Dinesh Dhankhar; India
125 kg	Amir Reza Masoumi; Iran	Mönkhtöriin Lkhagvagerel; Mongolia	Shamil Sharipov; Bahrain

=== Men's Greco-Roman ===
Event	Gold	Silver	Bronze
55 kg	Kohei Yamagiwa; Japan	Sajjad Ali; Iraq	Ro Yu-chol; North Korea
55 kg	Kohei Yamagiwa; Japan	Sajjad Ali; Iraq	Ikhtiyor Botirov; Uzbekistan
60 kg	Ri Se-ung; North Korea	Alisher Ganiev; Uzbekistan	Kaito Inaba; Japan
60 kg	Ri Se-ung; North Korea	Alisher Ganiev; Uzbekistan	Xi Ziyue; China
63 kg	Aytjan Khalmakhanov; Uzbekistan	Mohammad Mehdi Keshtkar; Iran	Chung Han-jae; South Korea
63 kg	Aytjan Khalmakhanov; Uzbekistan	Mohammad Mehdi Keshtkar; Iran	Kim Chan; North Korea
67 kg	Saeid Esmaeili; Iran	Razzak Beishekeev; Kyrgyzstan	Son Man-gwang; North Korea
67 kg	Saeid Esmaeili; Iran	Razzak Beishekeev; Kyrgyzstan	Katsuaki Endo; Japan
72 kg	Danial Sohrabi; Iran	Abdullo Aliev; Uzbekistan	Leng Ji; China
72 kg	Danial Sohrabi; Iran	Abdullo Aliev; Uzbekistan	Issei Honna; Japan
77 kg	Aram Vardanyan; Uzbekistan	Alireza Abdevali; Iran	Ibragim Magomadov; Kazakhstan
77 kg	Aram Vardanyan; Uzbekistan	Alireza Abdevali; Iran	Yryskeldi Maksatbek Uulu; Kyrgyzstan
82 kg	Mohammad Naghousi; Iran	Omar Satayev; Kazakhstan	Kang Bo-seong; South Korea
82 kg	Mohammad Naghousi; Iran	Omar Satayev; Kazakhstan	Shahin Badaghi; Qatar
87 kg	Jalgasbay Berdimuratov; Uzbekistan	Yasin Yazdi; Iran	Shamil Ozhaev; Kazakhstan
87 kg	Jalgasbay Berdimuratov; Uzbekistan	Yasin Yazdi; Iran	Sunil Kumar; India
97 kg	Mohammad Hadi Saravi; Iran	Yuri Nakazato; Japan	Nitesh Siwach; India
97 kg	Mohammad Hadi Saravi; Iran	Yuri Nakazato; Japan	Zhang Youfang; China
130 kg	Fardin Hedayati; Iran	Alimkhan Syzdykov; Kazakhstan	Ali Yaseen; Iraq
130 kg	Fardin Hedayati; Iran	Alimkhan Syzdykov; Kazakhstan	Yuta Nara; Japan

=== Women's freestyle ===
Event	Gold	Silver	Bronze
50 kg	Remina Yoshimoto; Japan	Zhang Yu; China	Byambasürengiin Mönkhnar; Mongolia
50 kg	Remina Yoshimoto; Japan	Zhang Yu; China	Won Myong-gyong; North Korea
53 kg	Choe Hyo-gyong; North Korea	Moe Kiyooka; Japan	Zeinep Bayanova; Kazakhstan
53 kg	Choe Hyo-gyong; North Korea	Moe Kiyooka; Japan	Antim Panghal; India
55 kg	Oh Kyong-ryong; North Korea	Li Yuxuan; China	Haruna Okuno; Japan
55 kg	Oh Kyong-ryong; North Korea	Li Yuxuan; China	Bayanmönkhiin Otgontuyaa; Mongolia
57 kg	Sara Natami; Japan	Son Il-sim; North Korea	Hong Kexin; China
57 kg	Sara Natami; Japan	Son Il-sim; North Korea	Kwon Young-jin; South Korea
59 kg	Sakura Onishi; Japan	Hong Pyol; North Korea	Muskan Nandal; India
59 kg	Sakura Onishi; Japan	Hong Pyol; North Korea	Xie Mengyu; China
62 kg	Manisha Bhanwala; India	Kim Ok-ju; North Korea	Nonoka Ozaki; Japan
62 kg	Manisha Bhanwala; India	Kim Ok-ju; North Korea	Kalmira Bilimbek Kyzy; Kyrgyzstan
65 kg	Miwa Morikawa; Japan	Tüvshinjargalyn Enkhjin; Mongolia	Zhang Qi; China
65 kg	Miwa Morikawa; Japan	Tüvshinjargalyn Enkhjin; Mongolia	Shakhzoda Allaniyazova; Uzbekistan
68 kg	Li Zelu; China	Pak Sol-gum; North Korea	Enkhsaikhany Delgermaa; Mongolia
68 kg	Li Zelu; China	Pak Sol-gum; North Korea	Mansi Lather; India
72 kg	Zhamila Bakbergenova; Kazakhstan	Liu Yuqi; China	Masako Furuichi; Japan
72 kg	Zhamila Bakbergenova; Kazakhstan	Liu Yuqi; China	Zorigtyn Bolortungalag; Mongolia
76 kg	Aiperi Medet Kyzy; Kyrgyzstan	Reetika Hooda; India	Yangla; China
76 kg	Aiperi Medet Kyzy; Kyrgyzstan	Reetika Hooda; India	Nodoka Yamamoto; Japan

== Participating nations ==
364 competitors from 25 nations competed.

- Afghanistan (1)
- Bahrain (6)
- China (30)
- Chinese Taipei (6)
- India (30)
- Indonesia (5)
- Iran (20)
- Iraq (9)
- Japan (30)
- Jordan (16)
- Kazakhstan (30)
- Kyrgyzstan (27)
- Mongolia (23)
- North Korea (16)
- Palestine (2)
- Philippines (4)
- Qatar (4)
- Saudi Arabia (3)
- Singapore (6)
- South Korea (30)
- Sri Lanka (5)
- Tajikistan (12)
- Turkmenistan (16)
- Uzbekistan (29)
- Vietnam (4)
