= 2023 World Wrestling Championships – Women's freestyle 59 kg =

Wrestling competitions

Women's freestyle 59 kg at the 2023 World Championships
- Venue: Štark Arena
- Dates: 18–19 September 2023
- Competitors: 22 from 19 nations

Medalists
gold medal	Zhang Qi	China
silver medal	Yuliya Tkach	Ukraine
bronze medal	Jennifer Rogers	United States
bronze medal	Othelie Høie	Norway

The women's freestyle 59 kg is a competition featured at the 2023 World Wrestling Championships, and was held in Belgrade, Serbia on 18 and 19 September 2023.

This freestyle wrestling competition consists of a single-elimination tournament, with a repechage used to determine the winner of two bronze medals. The two finalists face off for gold and silver medals. Each wrestler who loses to one of the two finalists moves into the repechage, culminating in a pair of bronze medal matches featuring the semifinal losers each facing the remaining repechage opponent from their half of the bracket.

== Results ==
Legend

- F — Won by fall

=== Final ===
Final
Zhang Qi (CHN)	4
Yuliya Tkach (UKR)	1

=== Top half ===
Round of 32
Laurence Beauregard (CAN)	0
Anjali Gahlawat (UWW)	12
Khürelkhüügiin Bolortuyaa (MGL)	12^{F}
Krystsina Sazykina (AIN)	5
Tamara Dollák (HUN)	6
Dzhanan Manolova (BUL)	1

Round of 16
Jowita Wrzesień (POL)	0
Sae Nanjo (JPN)	4
Anjali Gahlawat (UWW)	0
Jennifer Rogers (USA)	11
Alyona Kolesnik (AZE)	6
Khürelkhüügiin Bolortuyaa (MGL)	3
Tamara Dollák (HUN)	0
Zhang Qi (CHN)	12

Quarterfinals
Sae Nanjo (JPN)	4
Jennifer Rogers (USA)	6
Alyona Kolesnik (AZE)	0
Zhang Qi (CHN)	8^{F}

Semifinals
Jennifer Rogers (USA)	1
Zhang Qi (CHN)	5

=== Bottom half ===
Round of 32
Jovana Radivojević (SRB)	0
Anastasiia Sidelnikova (AIN)	10
Susana Lozano (MEX)	10
Laralei Gandaoli (GUM)	0
Elena Brugger (GER)	10
Mehlika Öztürk (TUR)	0

Round of 16
Yuliya Tkach (UKR)	5^{F}
Anastasiia Sidelnikova (AIN)	4
Susana Lozano (MEX)	1
Othelie Høie (NOR)	5
Siwar Bousetta (TUN)	1
Elena Brugger (GER)	12
Victoria Báez (ESP)	1
Diana Kayumova (KAZ)	3

Quarterfinals
Yuliya Tkach (UKR)	5
Othelie Høie (NOR)	0
Elena Brugger (GER)	11
Diana Kayumova (KAZ)	0

Semifinals
Yuliya Tkach (UKR)	2^{F}
Elena Brugger (GER)	0

=== Repechage ===
Repechage round 2
Tamara Dollák (HUN)	0
Alyona Kolesnik (AZE)	10
Anastasiia Sidelnikova (AIN)	4
Othelie Høie (NOR)	4

Bronze medals
Alyona Kolesnik (AZE)	0
Jennifer Rogers (USA)	4^{F}
Othelie Høie (NOR)	5
Elena Brugger (GER)	1

== Final standing ==
Rank	Athlete
1st place, gold medalist(s)	Zhang Qi (CHN)
2nd place, silver medalist(s)	Yuliya Tkach (UKR)
3rd place, bronze medalist(s)	Jennifer Rogers (USA)
3rd place, bronze medalist(s)	Othelie Høie (NOR)
5	Alyona Kolesnik (AZE)
5	Elena Brugger (GER)
7	Khürelkhüügiin Bolortuyaa (MGL)
8	Anastasiia Sidelnikova (AIN)
9	Susana Lozano (MEX)
10	Anjali Gahlawat (UWW)
11	Sae Nanjo (JPN)
12	Tamara Dollák (HUN)
13	Diana Kayumova (KAZ)
14	Victoria Báez (ESP)
15	Dzhanan Manolova (BUL)
16	Siwar Bousetta (TUN)
17	Krystsina Sazykina (AIN)
18	Jowita Wrzesień (POL)
19	Jovana Radivojević (SRB)
20	Laralei Gandaoli (GUM)
21	Mehlika Öztürk (TUR)
22	Laurence Beauregard (CAN)
