= 2026 World Wrestling Championships – Women's freestyle 62 kg =

Wrestling competitions

Women's freestyle 62 kg at the 2026 World Championships
- Venue: Barys Arena
- Dates: 28–29 October 2026
- Competitors: 20 from 20 nations

Medalists
gold medal	Adaugo Nwachukwu	United States
silver medal	Nonoka Ozaki	Japan
bronze medal	Amina Tandelova	Russia
bronze medal	Bilyana Dudova	Bulgaria

The women's freestyle 62 kilograms is a competition featured at the 2026 World Wrestling Championships, and was held in Astana, Kazakhstan on 28 and 29 October 2026.

This freestyle wrestling competition consists of a single-elimination tournament, with a repechage used to determine the winner of two bronze medals. The two finalists face off for gold and silver medals. Each wrestler who loses to one of the two finalists moves into the repechage, culminating in a pair of bronze medal matches, featuring the semifinal losers each facing the remaining repechage opponent from their half of the bracket.

== Results ==
Legend

- F — Won by fall

=== Final ===
Final
Nonoka Ozaki (JPN)	11
Adaugo Nwachukwu (USA)	12

=== Top half ===
Round of 32
Togtokhyn Altjin (MGL)	0
Irina Kuznetsova (KAZ)	4^{F}
Naemi Leistner (GER)	6
Améline Douarre (FRA)	1

Round of 16
Amina Tandelova (RUS)	10
Neha Sangwan (IND)	0
Irina Kuznetsova (KAZ)	0
Nonoka Ozaki (JPN)	10
Grace Bullen (NOR)	8^{F}
Naemi Leistner (GER)	1
Nina Bodișteanu (MDA)	0
Esther Kolawole (NGR)	10

Quarterfinals
Amina Tandelova (RUS)	1
Nonoka Ozaki (JPN)	4
Grace Bullen (NOR)	11
Esther Kolawole (NGR)	12

Semifinals
Nonoka Ozaki (JPN)	2
Esther Kolawole (NGR)	1

=== Bottom half ===
Round of 32
Nigina Sabirova (UZB)	0
Laís Nunes (BRA)	4
Zhang Qi (CHN)	5
Ilona Prokopevniuk (UKR)	8

Round of 16
Adaugo Nwachukwu (USA)	10
Sevim Akbaş (TUR)	0
Laís Nunes (BRA)	3
Johanna Lindborg (SWE)	3
Veranika Ivanova (BLR)	10
Ilona Prokopevniuk (UKR)	0
Ester Abraham (NAM)	2
Bilyana Dudova (BUL)	13

Quarterfinals
Adaugo Nwachukwu (USA)	11
Johanna Lindborg (SWE)	1
Veranika Ivanova (BLR)	2
Bilyana Dudova (BUL)	3

Semifinals
Adaugo Nwachukwu (USA)	5
Bilyana Dudova (BUL)	2

=== Repechage ===
Repechage round 2
Irina Kuznetsova (KAZ)	2
Amina Tandelova (RUS)	9^{F}
Sevim Akbaş (TUR)	0
Johanna Lindborg (SWE)	4

Bronze medals
Amina Tandelova (RUS)	7
Esther Kolawole (NGR)	3
Johanna Lindborg (SWE)	2
Bilyana Dudova (BUL)	5

== Final standing ==
Rank	Athlete
1st place, gold medalist(s)	Adaugo Nwachukwu (USA)
2nd place, silver medalist(s)	Nonoka Ozaki (JPN)
3rd place, bronze medalist(s)	Amina Tandelova (RUS)
3rd place, bronze medalist(s)	Bilyana Dudova (BUL)
5	Esther Kolawole (NGR)
5	Johanna Lindborg (SWE)
7	Grace Bullen (NOR)
8	Irina Kuznetsova (KAZ)
9	Veranika Ivanova (BLR)
10	Laís Nunes (BRA)
11	Ilona Prokopevniuk (UKR)
12	Naemi Leistner (GER)
13	Zhang Qi (CHN)
14	Ester Abraham (NAM)
15	Améline Douarre (FRA)
16	Togtokhyn Altjin (MGL)
17	Nigina Sabirova (UZB)
18	Neha Sangwan (IND)
19	Nina Bodișteanu (MDA)
20	Sevim Akbaş (TUR)
