= 2022 World Wrestling Championships – Women's freestyle 62 kg =

Wrestling competitions

Women's freestyle 62 kg at the 2022 World Championships
- Venue: Štark Arena
- Dates: 12–13 September 2022
- Competitors: 24 from 24 nations

Medalists
gold medal	Nonoka Ozaki	Japan
silver medal	Kayla Miracle	United States
bronze medal	Ilona Prokopevniuk	Ukraine
bronze medal	Luo Xiaojuan	China

The women's freestyle 62 kilograms is a competition featured at the 2022 World Wrestling Championships, and was held in Belgrade, Serbia on 12 and 13 September 2022.

This freestyle wrestling competition consists of a single-elimination tournament, with a repechage used to determine the winner of two bronze medals. The two finalists face off for gold and silver medals. Each wrestler who loses to one of the two finalists moves into the repechage, culminating in a pair of bronze medal matches featuring the semifinal losers each facing the remaining repechage opponent from their half of the bracket.

== Results ==
Legend

- F — Won by fall

=== Final ===
Final
Nonoka Ozaki (JPN)	10
Kayla Miracle (USA)	0

=== Top half ===
Round of 32
Bilyana Dudova (BUL)	5
Améline Douarre (FRA)	1
Lydia Pérez (ESP)	0
Johanna Lindborg (SWE)	7^{F}
Nataliia Shafir Mazur (ISR)	4
Yağmur Çakmak (TUR)	16
Lee Han-bit (KOR)	0
Anna Szél (HUN)	4^{F}

Round of 16
Aisuluu Tynybekova (KGZ)	3
Bilyana Dudova (BUL)	2
Johanna Lindborg (SWE)	1
Luisa Niemesch (GER)	7
Ilona Prokopevniuk (UKR)	4^{F}
Yağmur Çakmak (TUR)	0
Anna Szél (HUN)	0
Nonoka Ozaki (JPN)	6^{F}

Quarterfinals
Aisuluu Tynybekova (KGZ)	4
Luisa Niemesch (GER)	0
Ilona Prokopevniuk (UKR)	0
Nonoka Ozaki (JPN)	10

Semifinals
Aisuluu Tynybekova (KGZ)	5
Nonoka Ozaki (JPN)	11

=== Bottom half ===
Round of 32
Sükheegiin Tserenchimed (MGL)	8
Luo Xiaojuan (CHN)	9
Tetiana Omelchenko (AZE)	7
Nguyễn Thị Mỹ Hạnh (VIE)	4
Sonam Malik (IND)	8
Ayaulym Kassymova (KAZ)	0
Ariukhan Jumabaeva (UZB)	3
Ana Fabijan (SRB)	1

Round of 16
Kayla Miracle (USA)	17
Luo Xiaojuan (CHN)	6
Tetiana Omelchenko (AZE)	5
Marwa Amri (TUN)	5
Ana Godinez (CAN)	7
Sonam Malik (IND)	2
Ariukhan Jumabaeva (UZB)	0
Laís Nunes (BRA)	14

Quarterfinals
Kayla Miracle (USA)	6
Tetiana Omelchenko (AZE)	1
Ana Godinez (CAN)	4
Laís Nunes (BRA)	1

Semifinals
Kayla Miracle (USA)	2^{F}
Ana Godinez (CAN)	3

=== Repechage ===
Repechage round 2
Anna Szél (HUN)	0
Ilona Prokopevniuk (UKR)	4^{F}
Luo Xiaojuan (CHN)	3
Tetiana Omelchenko (AZE)	1

Bronze medals
Ilona Prokopevniuk (UKR)	8
Aisuluu Tynybekova (KGZ)	7
Luo Xiaojuan (CHN)	4
Ana Godinez (CAN)	3

== Final standing ==
Rank	Athlete
1st place, gold medalist(s)	Nonoka Ozaki (JPN)
2nd place, silver medalist(s)	Kayla Miracle (USA)
3rd place, bronze medalist(s)	Ilona Prokopevniuk (UKR)
3rd place, bronze medalist(s)	Luo Xiaojuan (CHN)
5	Aisuluu Tynybekova (KGZ)
5	Ana Godinez (CAN)
7	Tetiana Omelchenko (AZE)
8	Johanna Lindborg (SWE)
9	Anna Szél (HUN)
10	Laís Nunes (BRA)
11	Yağmur Çakmak (TUR)
12	Sonam Malik (IND)
13	Bilyana Dudova (BUL)
14	Luisa Niemesch (GER)
15	Ariukhan Jumabaeva (UZB)
16	Sükheegiin Tserenchimed (MGL)
17	Marwa Amri (TUN)
18	Nguyễn Thị Mỹ Hạnh (VIE)
19	Nataliia Shafir Mazur (ISR)
20	Ana Fabijan (SRB)
21	Améline Douarre (FRA)
22	Lee Han-bit (KOR)
23	Lydia Pérez (ESP)
24	Ayaulym Kassymova (KAZ)
