= Madina Bakbergenova =

Kazakhstani freestyle wrestler

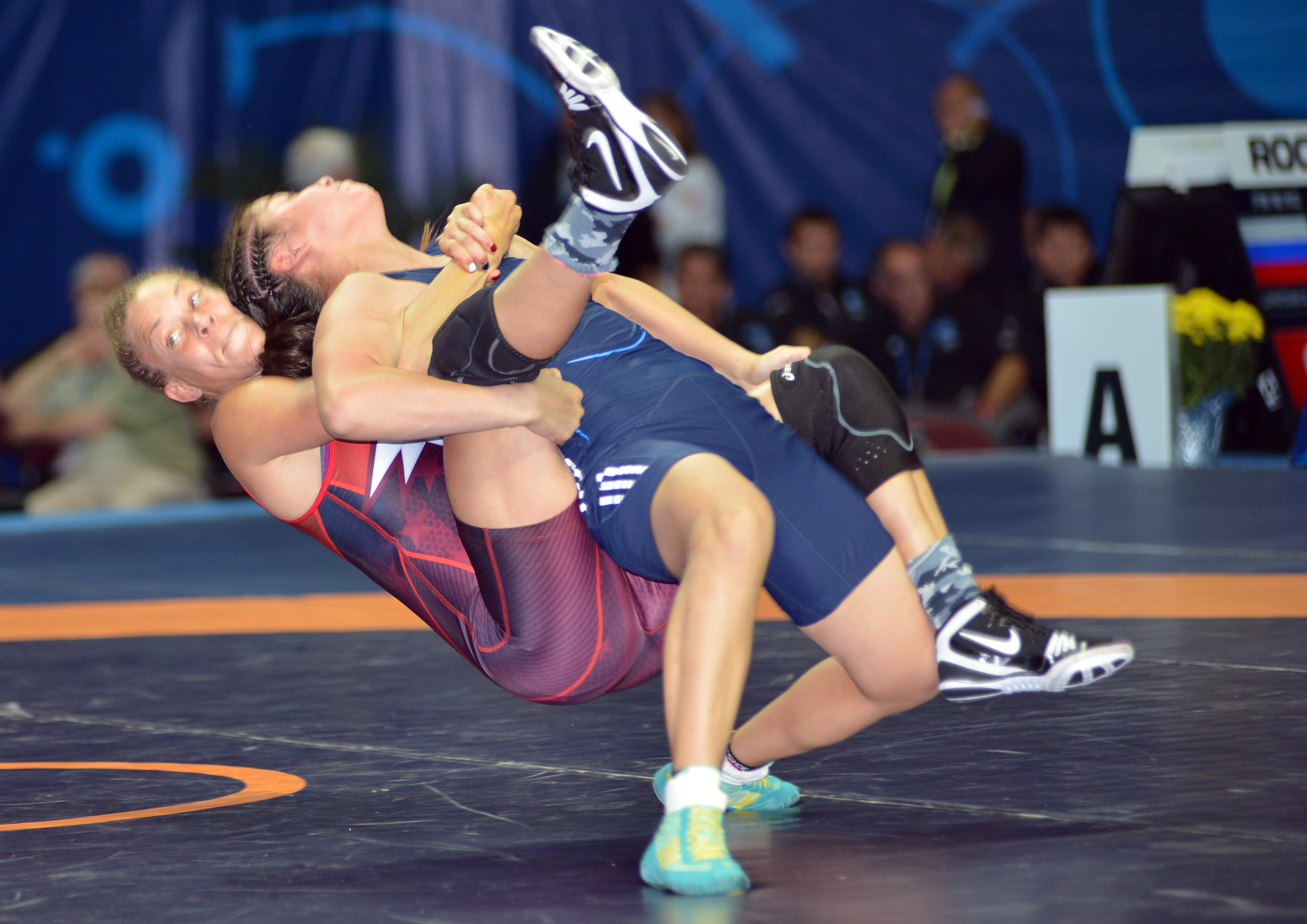
- Bakbergenova (in blue), 2015

Personal information
- Nationality: Kazakhstan
- Born: 6 January 1996 (age 30)
- Height: 165 cm (5 ft 5 in)

Sport
- Country: Kazakhstan
- Sport: Amateur wrestling
- Weight class: 68 kg
- Event: Freestyle
Medal record
Women's freestyle wrestling
Representing Kazakhstan
Asian Championships
| Gold medal – first place | 2022 Ulaanbaatar | 68 kg |
| Bronze medal – third place | 2016 Bangkok | 60 kg |
| Bronze medal – third place | 2020 New Delhi | 59 kg |
Islamic Solidarity Games
| Silver medal – second place | 2021 Konya | 68 kg |
Golden Grand Prix Ivan Yarygin
| Bronze medal – third place | 2020 Krasnoyarsk | 59 kg |
World U23 Championships
| Bronze medal – third place | 2019 Budapest | 65 kg |
Asian U23 Championships
| Silver medal – second place | 2019 Ulaanbaatar | 59 kg |

Madina Bakbergenova (born 6 January 1996) is a Kazakhstani freestyle wrestler. She is a three-time medalist, including gold, at the Asian Wrestling Championships.

== Career ==
In the 60 kg event at the 2015 World Wrestling Championships held in Las Vegas, United States, she was eliminated in her first match by Leigh Jaynes of the United States. Jaynes went on to win one of the bronze medals.

In 2016, Bakbergenova won one of the bronze medals in the 60 kg event at the Asian Wrestling Championships in Bangkok, Thailand.

In 2019, Bakbergenova won the silver medal in the 59 kg event at the Asian U23 Wrestling Championship held in Ulaanbaatar, Mongolia. She also won one of the bronze medals in the 65 kg event at the World U23 Wrestling Championship held in Budapest, Hungary. In the same year, Bakbergenova also competed in the 59 kg event at the World Wrestling Championships held in Nur-Sultan, Kazakhstan where she was eliminated in her first match by Pei Xingru of China.

In 2020, at the Golden Grand Prix Ivan Yarygin held in Krasnoyarsk, Russia, she won one of the bronze medals in the women's 59 kg event. In the same year, she also won the bronze medal in the 59 kg event at the Asian Wrestling Championships in New Delhi, India.

In 2022, Bakbergenova competed at the Yasar Dogu Tournament held in Istanbul, Turkey. She won the gold medal in her event at the 2022 Asian Wrestling Championships held in Ulaanbaatar, Mongolia. Bakbergenova won the silver medal in the 68 kg event at the 2021 Islamic Solidarity Games held in Konya, Turkey. She competed in the 68 kg event at the 2022 World Wrestling Championships held in Belgrade, Serbia.

== Achievements ==
| Year | Tournament | Location | Result | Event |
|---|---|---|---|---|
| 2016 | Asian Championships | Bangkok, Thailand | 3rd | Freestyle 60 kg |
| 2020 | Asian Championships | New Delhi, India | 3rd | Freestyle 59 kg |
| 2022 | Asian Championships | Ulaanbaatar, Mongolia | 1st | Freestyle 68 kg |
