= Robert Ord (disambiguation) =

Robert Ord may refer to:

- Robert Ord (1700–1778), British lawyer and politician
- Robert L. Ord III (born 1940), U.S. Army lieutenant general
