= Wrestling at the 2022 Asian Games – Women's freestyle 62 kg =

Women's freestyle 62 kg at the 2022 Asian Games
- Venue: Lin'an Sports and Culture Centre
- Date: 6 October 2023
- Competitors: 14 from 14 nations

Medalists
| gold medal | Mun Hyon-gyong | North Korea |
| silver medal | Nonoka Ozaki | Japan |
| bronze medal | Sonam Malik | India |
| bronze medal | Aisuluu Tynybekova | Kyrgyzstan |

The women's freestyle 62 kilograms wrestling competition at the 2022 Asian Games in Hangzhou was held on 5 October 2023 at the Lin'an Sports and Culture Centre.

This freestyle wrestling competition consists of a single-elimination tournament, with a repechage used to determine the winner of two bronze medals. The two finalists face off for gold and silver medals. Each wrestler who loses to one of the two finalists moves into the repechage, culminating in a pair of bronze medal matches featuring the semifinal losers each facing the remaining repechage opponent from their half of the bracket.

== Schedule ==
All times are China Standard Time (UTC+08:00)

| Date | Time | Event |
|---|---|---|
| Friday, 6 October 2023 | 10:00 | 1/8 finals |
| Friday, 6 October 2023 | 10:00 | 1/4 finals |
| Friday, 6 October 2023 | 10:00 | Semifinals |
| Friday, 6 October 2023 | 10:00 | Repechages |
| Friday, 6 October 2023 | 17:00 | Finals |

== Results ==
Legend

- F — Won by fall

=== Main bracket ===
1/8 finals
Sonam Malik (IND) | 10
Sushila Chand (NEP) | 0
Mun Hyon-gyong (PRK) | 7^{F}
Long Jia (CHN) | 1
Dilfuza Aimbetova (UZB) | 3^{F}
Lee Han-bit (KOR) | 1
Aisuluu Tynybekova (KGZ) | 4^{F}
Salinee Srisombat (THA) | 0
Nonoka Ozaki (JPN) | 10
Nguyễn Thị Mỹ Hạnh (VIE) | 0
Irina Kuznetsova (KAZ) | 6^{F}
Sükheegiin Tserenchimed (MGL) | 4

1/4 finals
Soeurn Noeurn (CAM) | 0
Sonam Malik (IND) | 10
Mun Hyon-gyong (PRK) | 12
Dilfuza Aimbetova (UZB) | 1
Aisuluu Tynybekova (KGZ) | 1
Nonoka Ozaki (JPN) | 3
Irina Kuznetsova (KAZ) | 12
Pai Hsin-ping (TPE) | 0

Semifinals
Sonam Malik (IND) | 0
Mun Hyon-gyong (PRK) | 7^{F}
Nonoka Ozaki (JPN) | 8^{F}
Irina Kuznetsova (KAZ) | 0

Gold medal match
Mun Hyon-gyong (PRK) | 6
Nonoka Ozaki (JPN) | 6

=== Repechage ===
Repechage round 1
Long Jia (CHN) | 12
Dilfuza Aimbetova (UZB) | 0
Nguyễn Thị Mỹ Hạnh (VIE) | 0
Aisuluu Tynybekova (KGZ) | 10

Bronze medal matches
Long Jia (CHN) | 5
Sonam Malik (IND) | 7
Aisuluu Tynybekova (KGZ) | 2
Irina Kuznetsova (KAZ) | 1

== Final standing ==
| Rank | Athlete |
|---|---|
| 1st place, gold medalist(s) | Mun Hyon-gyong (PRK) |
| 2nd place, silver medalist(s) | Nonoka Ozaki (JPN) |
| 3rd place, bronze medalist(s) | Aisuluu Tynybekova (KGZ) |
| 3rd place, bronze medalist(s) | Sonam Malik (IND) |
| 5 | Long Jia (CHN) |
| 5 | Irina Kuznetsova (KAZ) |
| 7 | Dilfuza Aimbetova (UZB) |
| 8 | Sükheegiin Tserenchimed (MGL) |
| 9 | Lee Han-bit (KOR) |
| 10 | Salinee Srisombat (THA) |
| 11 | Soeurn Noeurn (CAM) |
| 12 | Sushila Chand (NEP) |
| 13 | Pai Hsin-ping (TPE) |
| 14 | Nguyễn Thị Mỹ Hạnh (VIE) |
