= Togtokhyn Altjin =

Mongolian freestyle wrestler (born 2003)

Personal information
- Native name: Тогтохын Алтжин
- Nationality: Mongolia
- Born: 13 April 2003 (age 23)
- Height: 168 cm (5 ft 6 in)

Sport
- Country: Mongolia
- Sport: Wrestling
- Weight class: 59 kg 62 kg
- Event: Freestyle
Medal record
Women's freestyle wrestling
Representing Mongolia
World Championships
Bronze medal – third place	2025 Zagreb	59 kg
Asian Games
Bronze medal – third place	2026 Aichi–Nagoya	62 kg
U15 Asian Championships
Silver medal – second place	2018 Fujimi	54 kg

Togtokhyn Altjin (Mongolian: Тогтохын Алтжин; born 13 April 2003) is a Mongolian freestyle wrestler who has competed in the 59 kg and 62 kg divisions. She is a bronze medalist at the World Wrestling Championships and the Asian Games.

== Career ==
In March 2025, Altjin competed in the 59 kg event at the Asian Wrestling Championships held in Amman, Jordan. She reached the semifinals where she lost to Sakura Onishi and lost her bronze medal match to Muskan Nandal. She then competed in the 2025 Ulaanbaatar Open, where she lost to Nandal in the finals.

Altjin competed in the 59 kg event at the 2025 World Wrestling Championships held in Zagreb, Croatia. In the round of 16, she defeated Viktoriia Khusainova 9–1, while in the following round, she defeated Elena Brugger by fall. Altjin was then eliminated by Onishi by fall in the semifinals. She won her bronze medal match by defeating Anastasiia Sidelnikova 8–4.

Altjin competed in 62 kg event at the 2026 Asian Games, where she was eliminated by eventual gold medalist Nonoka Ozaki in the semifinals. Assigned to the repechage, she won a bronze medal by defeating Mansi Ahlawat.
