= 2024 World Wrestling Championships – Women's freestyle 59 kg =

Wrestling competitions

Women's freestyle 59 kg at the 2024 World Championships
- Venue: Tirana Olympic Park
- Dates: 29–30 October 2024
- Competitors: 22 from 21 nations

Medalists
gold medal	Risako Kinjo	Japan
silver medal	Sükheegiin Tserenchimed	Mongolia
bronze medal	Mansi Ahlawat	India
bronze medal	Elena Brugger	Germany

The women's freestyle 59 kilograms was a competition featured at the 2024 World Wrestling Championships, and was held in Tirana, Albania on 29 and 30 October 2024.

This freestyle wrestling competition consists of a single-elimination tournament, with a repechage used to determine the winner of two bronze medals. The two finalists face off for gold and silver medals. Each wrestler who loses to one of the two finalists moves into the repechage, culminating in a pair of bronze medal matches, featuring the semifinal losers each facing the remaining repechage opponent from their half of the bracket.

Each bout consists of a single round within a six-minute limit, including two halves of three minutes. The wrestler who scores more points is the winner.

== Results ==
Legend

- F — Won by fall

=== Final ===
Final
Sükheegiin Tserenchimed (MGL)	2
Risako Kinjo (JPN)	4

=== Top half ===
Round of 32
Sükheegiin Tserenchimed (MGL)	10
Alejandra Rivera (MEX)	0
Mansi Ahlawat (IND)	2
Jacarra Winchester (USA)	1
Solomiia Vynnyk (UKR)	5
Mariana Cherdivara (MDA)	3

Round of 16
Alyona Kolesnik (AZE)	16
Ana França (BRA)	6
Sükheegiin Tserenchimed (MGL)	8
Laurence Beauregard (CAN)	8
Eda Tekin (TUR)	0
Mansi Ahlawat (IND)	3
Solomiia Vynnyk (UKR)	10
Kateryna Zhydachevska (ROU)	0

Quarterfinals
Alyona Kolesnik (AZE)	0
Sükheegiin Tserenchimed (MGL)	9
Mansi Ahlawat (IND)	4
Solomiia Vynnyk (UKR)	0

Semifinals
Sükheegiin Tserenchimed (MGL)	4
Mansi Ahlawat (IND)	1

=== Bottom half ===
Round of 32
Svetlana Lipatova (AIN)	4
Evelina Hulthén (SWE)	2
Evelina Nikolova (BUL)	10^{F}
Magdalena Głodek (POL)	0
Erika Bognár (HUN)	10
Sierra Brown Ton (JAM)	0

Round of 16
Diana Kayumova (KAZ)	0
Svetlana Lipatova (AIN)	7^{F}
Evelina Nikolova (BUL)	4^{F}
Victoria Báez (ESP)	2
Risako Kinjo (JPN)	4^{F}
Erika Bognár (HUN)	0
Feng Yongxin (CHN)	6
Elena Brugger (GER)	5^{F}

Quarterfinals
Svetlana Lipatova (AIN)	5
Evelina Nikolova (BUL)	3
Risako Kinjo (JPN)	10
Elena Brugger (GER)	0

Semifinals
Svetlana Lipatova (AIN)	0
Risako Kinjo (JPN)	9

=== Repechage ===
Repechage round 1
Alejandra Rivera (MEX)	0
Laurence Beauregard (CAN)	10

Repechage round 2
Laurence Beauregard (CAN)	15
Alyona Kolesnik (AZE)	4
Erika Bognár (HUN)	1
Elena Brugger (GER)	4^{F}

Bronze medals
Laurence Beauregard (CAN)	0
Mansi Ahlawat (IND)	5
Elena Brugger (GER)	6
Svetlana Lipatova (AIN)	3

== Final standing ==
Rank	Athlete
1st place, gold medalist(s)	Risako Kinjo (JPN)
2nd place, silver medalist(s)	Sükheegiin Tserenchimed (MGL)
3rd place, bronze medalist(s)	Mansi Ahlawat (IND)
3rd place, bronze medalist(s)	Elena Brugger (GER)
5	Laurence Beauregard (CAN)
5	Svetlana Lipatova (AIN)
7	Evelina Nikolova (BUL)
8	Solomiia Vynnyk (UKR)
9	Alyona Kolesnik (AZE)
10	Erika Bognár (HUN)
11	Ana França (BRA)
12	Mariana Cherdivara (MDA)
13	Evelina Hulthén (SWE)
14	Jacarra Winchester (USA)
15	Feng Yongxin (CHN)
16	Victoria Báez (ESP)
17	Eda Tekin (TUR)
18	Diana Kayumova (KAZ)
19	Kateryna Zhydachevska (ROU)
20	Magdalena Głodek (POL)
21	Sierra Brown Ton (JAM)
22	Alejandra Rivera (MEX)
