= 2022 U23 World Wrestling Championships – Women's freestyle 62 kg =

Wrestling competitions

Women's freestyle 62 kg at the 2022 U23 World Championships
- Venue: Pontevedra Municipal Sports Hall
- Dates: 20–21 October
- Competitors: 13 from 13 nations

Medalists
gold medal	Nonoka Ozaki	Japan
silver medal	Iryna Bondar	Ukraine
bronze medal	Ana Godinez	Canada
bronze medal	Astrid Montero	Venezuela

The women's freestyle 62 kilograms is a competition featured at the 2022 U23 World Wrestling Championships, and was held in Pontevedra, Spain on 20 and 21 October 2022. The qualification rounds were held on 20 October while medal matches were held on the 2nd day of the competition. A total of 13 wrestlers competed in this event, limited to athletes whose body weight was less than 62 kilograms.

This freestyle wrestling competition consists of a single-elimination tournament, with a repechage used to determine the winner of two bronze medals. The two finalists face off for gold and silver medals. Each wrestler who loses to one of the two finalists moves into the repechage, culminating in a pair of bronze medal matches featuring the semifinal losers each facing the remaining repechage opponent from their half of the bracket.

== Results ==
Legend

- F — Won by fall

=== Main bracket ===
Round of 16
Nonoka Ozaki (JPN)	10
Paulina Danisz (POL)	0
Ana Fabijan (SRB)	0
Yağmur Çakmak (TUR)	10
Ana Godinez (CAN)	9
Irina Kuznetsova (KAZ)	0
Astrid Montero (VEN)	4^{F}
Birgül Soltanova (AZE)	6
Iryna Bondar (UKR)	6
Anna Szél (HUN)	3

Quarterfinals
Pai Hsin-ping (TPE)	0
Nonoka Ozaki (JPN)	10
Yağmur Çakmak (TUR)	4
Ana Godinez (CAN)	14
Alexandria Liles (USA)	0
Astrid Montero (VEN)	4
Iryna Bondar (UKR)	4
Améline Douarre (FRA)	1

Semifinals
Nonoka Ozaki (JPN)	10
Ana Godinez (CAN)	0
Astrid Montero (VEN)	0
Iryna Bondar (UKR)	10

Final
Nonoka Ozaki (JPN)	11
Iryna Bondar (UKR)	0

=== Repechage ===
Repechage round
Paulina Danisz (POL)	6
Pai Hsin-ping (TPE)	4
Anna Szél (HUN)	2
Améline Douarre (FRA)	6

Bronze medals
Paulina Danisz (POL)	0
Ana Godinez (CAN)	11
Améline Douarre (FRA)	1
Astrid Montero (VEN)	3

== Final standing ==
Rank	Athlete
1st place, gold medalist(s)	Nonoka Ozaki (JPN)
2nd place, silver medalist(s)	Iryna Bondar (UKR)
3rd place, bronze medalist(s)	Ana Godinez (CAN)
3rd place, bronze medalist(s)	Astrid Montero (VEN)
5	Paulina Danisz (POL)
5	Améline Douarre (FRA)
7	Yağmur Çakmak (TUR)
8	Anna Szél (HUN)
9	Pai Hsin-ping (TPE)
10	Birgül Soltanova (AZE)
11	Alexandria Liles (USA)
12	Irina Kuznetsova (KAZ)
13	Ana Fabijan (SRB)
