= Ben Ijalana =

American football player (born 1989)

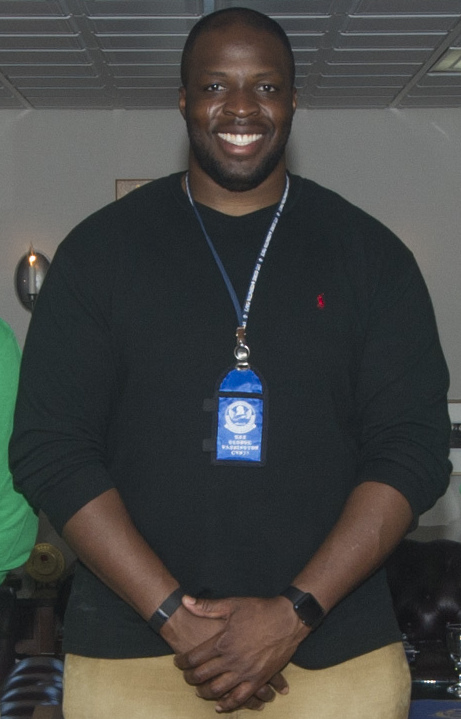
- Ijalana aboard USS George Washington in 2016

No. 79, 71
- Position: Offensive tackle

Personal information
- Born: August 6, 1989 (age 37); New Brunswick, New Jersey, U.S.
- Listed height: 6 ft 4 in (1.93 m)
- Listed weight: 322 lb (146 kg)

Career information
- High school: Rancocas Valley Regional (Mount Holly, New Jersey)
- College: Villanova
- NFL draft: 2011: 2nd round, 49th overall pick

Career history
- Indianapolis Colts (2011–2012); New York Jets (2013–2018); Jacksonville Jaguars (2019)

Awards and highlights
- 2009 FCS All-American (Walter Camp); 2× All-CAA First-team (2008, 2009)

Career NFL statistics
- Games played: 34
- Games started: 13
- Stats at Pro Football Reference

Benjamin Ijalana (/ˌaɪdʒəˈlɑːnə/ EYE-jə-LAH-nə; born August 6, 1989) is an American former professional football player who was an offensive tackle in the National Football League (NFL). He played college football for the Villanova Wildcats and was selected by the Indianapolis Colts in the second round of the 2011 NFL draft.

== Early life ==
Ijalana's parents immigrated to the U.S. from Nigeria. A native of New Brunswick, New Jersey, Ijalana attended Willingboro High School in his freshman and sophomore year, before moving to Hainesport Township and transferring to Rancocas Valley Regional High School, where he was a two-way lineman, and district champion in wrestling.

== College career ==
He started every game at left tackle since his true freshman year at Villanova.

Ijalana was named to the 2010 Outland Trophy watch list as the only Football Championship Subdivision player.

== Professional career ==
=== Pre-draft ===
Pre-draft measurables
Height	Weight	Arm length	Hand span	Wingspan	40-yard dash	10-yard split	20-yard split	20-yard shuttle	Three-cone drill	Vertical jump	Broad jump
6 ft 3 5/8 in (1.92 m)	317 lb (144 kg)	36 in (0.91 m)	10 1/2 in (0.27 m)	6 ft 11 3/8 in (2.12 m)	5.20 s	1.75 s	2.93 s	4.70 s	7.75 s	25.5 in (0.65 m)	8 ft 9 in (2.67 m)
All values from NFL Combine/Pro Day

The Sporting News listed Ijalana as one of the five most "intriguing small-school prospects".

Entering draft day, Ijalana was listed as a second round prospect with the possibility of jumping into the first round. He was projected as a right tackle, following his strong showing as a left tackle in college and his good arm length and hand size. Additionally, he had the ability to fall back as a guard.

=== Indianapolis Colts ===
On day two of the 2011 NFL draft, the Indianapolis Colts traded their 53rd and 152nd pick to the Redskins for the 49th pick to draft Ijalana. He was the highest selected Villanova Wildcat since Howie Long in 1981.

Ijalana played four games in his rookie season before tearing his ACL and landing on injured reserve.

A few weeks after being cleared to play, Ijalana tore his ACL again during training camp in 2012. Ijalana was eventually declared out for the 2012 season. He was waived/injured on August 1, 2012, and he was subsequently placed on injured reserve on August 5.

=== New York Jets ===
Ijalala was claimed off waivers by the New York Jets on September 1, 2013. On April 9, 2016, Ijalana signed a one-year contract extension with the Jets. On March 9, 2017, Ijalana signed a two-year, $11 million contract extension with the Jets.

On February 19, 2018, the Jets declined the second-year option on Ijalana's contract, making him a free agent. However on March 16, 2018, Ijalana re-signed with the Jets on a one-year deal. He was placed on injured reserve on August 15, 2018.

=== Jacksonville Jaguars ===
On August 11, 2019, Ijalana was signed by the Jacksonville Jaguars. He was placed on injured reserve on August 31, 2019.

== Executive career ==
On June 3, 2022, Ijalana was hired by the Philadelphia Eagles as a scouting assistant.
