= Rancocas Valley Regional High School =

High school in Burlington County, New Jersey, US

Address
- 520 Jacksonville Road Mount Holly, Burlington County, New Jersey, 08060; United States
- Coordinates: 40.004394°N 74.780696°W

District information
- Grades: 9–12
- Superintendent: Karen Benton
- Business administrator: Kristen Mari
- Schools: 1

Students and staff
- Enrollment: 1,928 (as of 2024–25)
- Faculty: 136.0 FTEs
- Student–teacher ratio: 14.2:1

Other information
- District Factor Group: DE
- Website: www.rvrhs.com
Ind.	Per pupil	District spending	Rank (*)	9-12 average	%± vs. average
1A	Total Spending	$17,399	5	$18,891	−7.9%
1	Budgetary Cost	13,700	9	15,592	−12.1%
2	Classroom Instruction	7,637	7	8,807	−13.3%
6	Support Services	1,761	7	2,294	−23.2%
8	Administrative Cost	1,637	23	1,592	2.8%
10	Operations & Maintenance	2,048	27	1,954	4.8%
13	Extracurricular Activities	618	9	873	−29.2%
16	Median Teacher Salary	64,027	16	71,726
Data from NJDoE 2014 Taxpayers' Guide to Education Spending. *Of 9-12 districts with any number of students. Lowest spending=1; Highest=47

Rancocas Valley Regional High School
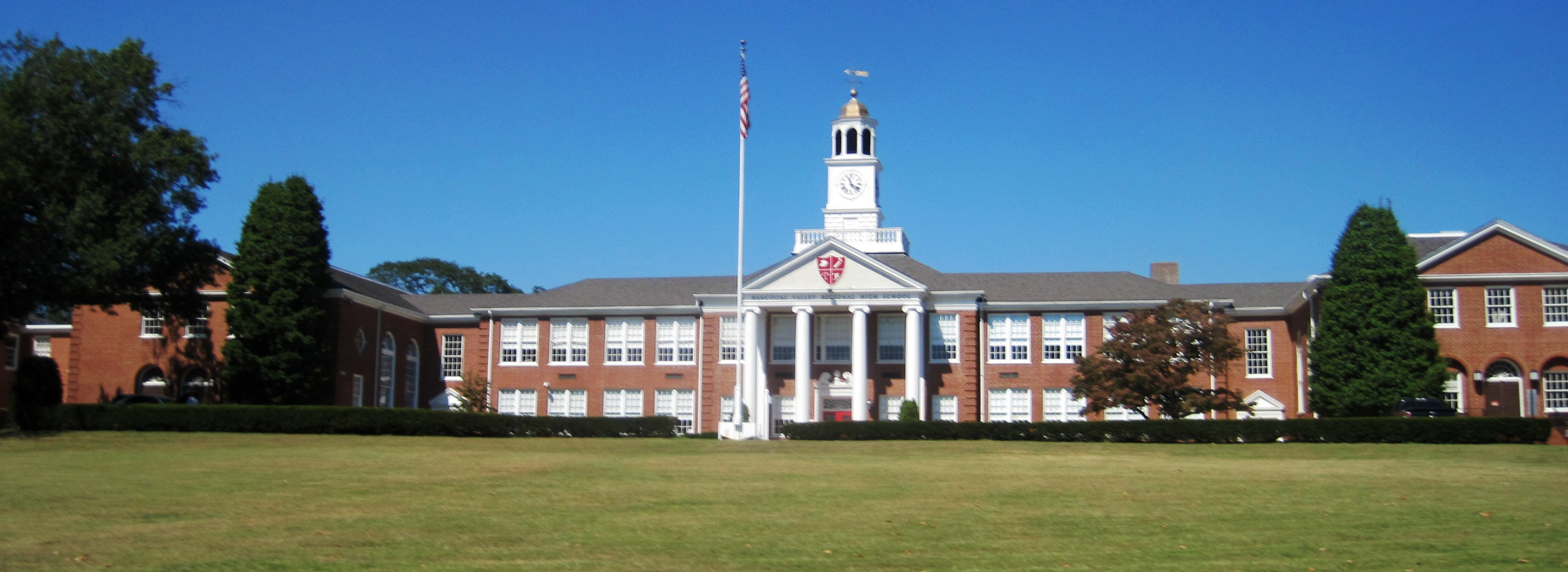
- Front of the school campus

Information
- Type: Public high school
- Established: 1937
- NCES School ID: 341362001230
- Principal: Shawn Counard
- Faculty: 136.0 FTEs
- Grades: 9–12
- Enrollment: 1,928 (as of 2024–25)
- Student to teacher ratio: 14.2:1
- Colors: Red; White
- Athletics conference: Burlington County Scholastic League (general); West Jersey Football League (football)
- Team name: Red Devils
- Accreditation: Middle States Association of Colleges and Schools

Rancocas Valley Regional High School is a regional high school and public school district serving students in ninth through twelfth grades from five communities in Burlington County, in the U.S. state of New Jersey. The district encompasses approximately 40 square miles (100 km^{2}) and comprises the communities of Eastampton Township, Hainesport Township, Lumberton, Mount Holly and Westampton. The school is located in Mount Holly. The school has been accredited by the Middle States Association of Colleges and Schools Commission on Elementary and Secondary Schools since 1938; the school's current accreditation extends until January 2028. The high school is the only facility of the Rancocas Valley Regional High School District.

As of the 2024–25 school year, the school had an enrollment of 1,928 students and 136.0 classroom teachers (on an FTE basis), for a student–teacher ratio of 14.2:1. There were 576 students (29.9% of enrollment) eligible for free lunch and 147 (7.6% of students) eligible for reduced-cost lunch.

== History ==
The school was built on the ruins of the West Jersey Collegiate Institute, a private school for boys that was abandoned at the time of the Civil War. Mount Holly High School was founded in 1895, and after a vote to establish a regional high school, the name "Rancocas Valley Regional High School" was chosen in April 1935. Constructed at a cost of $300,000, a crowd of 500 attended the school's formal dedication ceremonies in October 1937.

Before Lenape High School opened in September 1958, students from Medford, Medford Lakes and Tabernacle Township had attended Rancocas Valley Regional High School. With students in these three communities in ninth and tenth grades attending Lenape, the Rancocas Valley district anticipated a drop in enrollment of 90 students for the 1958-59 school year.

The district had been classified by the New Jersey Department of Education as being in District Factor Group "DE", the fifth highest of eight groupings. District Factor Groups organize districts statewide to allow comparison by common socioeconomic characteristics of the local districts. From lowest socioeconomic status to highest, the categories are A, B, CD, DE, FG, GH, I and J.

== Academic programs ==
Rancocas Valley Regional High School offers a range of college prep, honors, accelerated, Advanced Placement (AP) courses, business and technology education classes. Students can receive college credits by successfully completing specific high school courses through the Burlington County College Accelerated Program (CAP) and Seton Hall University Dual Enrollment Program. Rancocas Valley High School offers over 85 clubs and activities.

RVTV is operated out of the school and showcases sporting events, concerts, graduations and student-created programming.

=== Annex ===
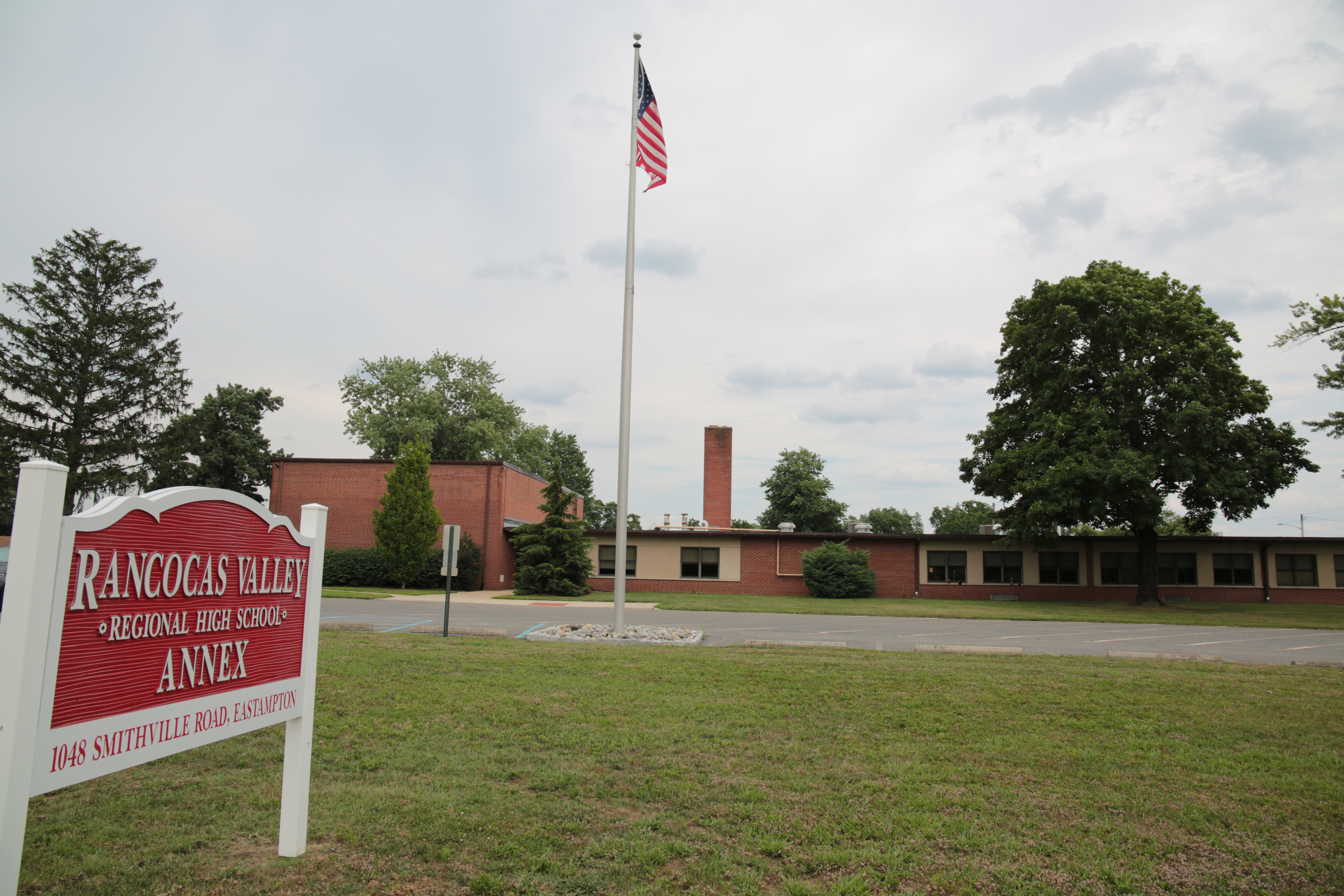
RVRHS Annex Building

The Rancocas Valley Regional High School Annex on Smithville Road in Eastampton Township is home to the district's business offices and the Functional Life Skills Integrated Program (FLIP), a special education program run by the district. Renovations to the Annex facilities were completed in the summer of 2018 to house the new RV PREP education program opening in September 2018. The building formerly housed the Eastampton Elementary School.

== Awards, recognition and rankings ==
The school was the 174th-ranked public high school in New Jersey out of 339 schools statewide in New Jersey Monthly magazine's September 2014 cover story on the state's "Top Public High Schools", using a new ranking methodology. The school had been ranked 255th in the state of 328 schools in 2012, after being ranked 223rd in 2010 out of 322 schools listed. The magazine ranked the school 242nd in 2008 out of 316 schools. The school was ranked 243rd in the magazine's September 2006 issue, which surveyed 316 schools across the state. In recognition of the school’s efforts and the positive outcomes resulting from newly formed programs and initiatives, the Anti-Defamation League (ADL) designated RVRHS a No Place for Hate school in May 2018.

== Athletics ==
The Rancocas Valley Regional High School Red Devils compete in the Burlington County Scholastic League (BCSL), which is comprised of public and private high schools in Burlington, Mercer and Ocean counties in central New Jersey, operating under the jurisdiction of the New Jersey State Interscholastic Athletic Association (NJSIAA). With 1,537 students in grades 10-12, the school was classified by the NJSIAA for the 2019–20 school year as Group IV for most athletic competition purposes, which included schools with an enrollment of 1,060 to 5,049 students in that grade range. The football team competes in the Memorial Division of the 94-team West Jersey Football League superconference and was classified by the NJSIAA as Group V South for football for 2024–2026, which included schools with 1,333 to 2,324 students. Rancocas Valley competes in the BCSL's Liberty Division. The school's mascot is the Red Devil and its colors are red and white.

The boys' cross country team won the Group III state championship in 1960. With a time of 12:34.4, Carl Budden was the top runner at the Group III championship in 1961.

The baseball team won the Group IV state championship in 1975 (defeating runner-up John F. Kennedy High School in the finals) and 1995 (vs. Northern Valley Regional High School at Demarest). The 1975 team finished the season with a 19-7 record after coming from behind to win the Group IV state title with a 6-5 win against Kennedy of Paterson, after tying the game in the seventh inning and scoring the winning run in extra innings. The team won the Group III title in 1995 with a 2-0 win against Northern Valley / Demarest on a series of hits in the game's first inning.

The softball team won state championships in Group III in 1977 (vs. Ramapo High School) and 1994 (vs. Passaic Valley Regional High School), and won in 2005 in Group IV (vs. J.P. Stevens High School). The 1977 team had an 18-4 record after winning the Group III title by defeating Ramapo by a score of 1-0 in the championship game. The 1994 team won the Group III title and finished the season with a 26-1 record with a 12-0 win against Passaic Valley in the championship game. The team won the Group IV title in 2005 with a 2-0 victory against J.P. Stevens in the playoff finals. NJ.com / The Star-Ledger ranked Rancocas Valley as their number-one softball team in the state in 1994 and 2005. The softball team won the 2007 Central, Group IV state sectional championship, edging Manalapan High School 1-0 in the tournament final.

The 1987 football team finished the season with a 9-2 record after winning the NJSIAA South Jersey Group III state sectional title with a 26-0 win against Point Pleasant Borough High School in the championship game. Just two years earlier, in 1985, the team failed to win a single game. RV has produced three first-round NFL draft picks in Franco Harris, Irving Fryar and Alonzo Spellman.

The girls track team won the indoor track Group III state championship in 1987 and the Group IV title in 2017.

The girls' field hockey team won the South Jersey Group III state sectional title in 1992 and the Central Jersey Group IV title in 2006, 2008 and 2018. The team took the Central Jersey Group IV state sectional title with a 2-1 win against Cherokee High School in the tournament final.

The boys basketball team won the Group III state title in 1996 (with a win against Henry Snyder High School in the tournament final) and won the Group IV title in 1998 (vs. John F. Kennedy High School) and 2008 (vs. Piscataway High School). The team won the 1996 Group III state championship with a 71-62 win against Henry Snyder High School and won the 1998 Group IV state championship with a 63-43 win against John F. Kennedy High School in the tournament final. In 2008, boys' basketball team won the Central Group IV state sectional championship with a 70-51 win over Trenton Central High School in the tournament final. The team went on to win the Group IV state championship, the programs' third title, with a 55-43 win against Piscataway High School. In 2011, the boys' basketball team added a sectional championship, by beating Jackson Memorial in the Central Jersey Group 4 title game.

In 1998, the boys' spring track team went undefeated for the first time since 1979.

In 2004, the boys' soccer team was Group IV co-champion with Kearny High School in a game that ended in a scoreless tie after regulation and two overtimes. The 2008 boys' soccer team won the Group IV state championship with a 2-0 win over Clifton High School.

The girls' basketball team won the Group IV state championship in 2011 (defeating John F. Kennedy High School in the tournament final) and 2013 (vs. Eastside High School). The team won the Group IV title in 2011 by a score of 67-52 score in the final game of the playoffs against John F. Kennedy High School. The team won the 2013 Group IV title with a 64-45 win against Eastside High School in the finals.

The boys track team won the Group IV spring / outdoor track state championship in 2015.

The school is represented by an ice hockey team in Varsity Tier I of the South Jersey High School Ice Hockey League.

== Extracurricular activities ==
Rancocas Valley is the home of the Rancocas Valley Regional High School dance team, which has been in existence since 1999 and is the only high school dance team in South Jersey. The team prepares two elite dances every year for their competitions and to perform at basketball games. The team hosts the Reach For The Stars Dance Show in January of every year for the community. Over the course of the year, the team competes in 4 to 5 competitions. One of those competitions is the New Jersey state championship. In the years 2008, 2009, 2010, 2011, 2014 and 2015, the dance team has taken first place in both their Team Performance and their Kick routine. Every year the team raises money for their trip to Florida to compete in the National Dance Alliance (NDA) National Dance Competition. The team dances amongst and against the best dance teams in the country. In 2010 the team took 1st place in their Circus-themed High Kick Routine. This was the first national championship the team has ever won. In 2011 the team took 1st place again with their Time-themed Team Performance routine. In 2014, the team won its third national championship, by winning the Small Varsity Kick division.

In 2004, the RVRHS marching band won their first Group 3 National Championship Title in Allentown, PA for their piece "Pandora's Box". In 2009, The Marching Band won first place at the USSBA Group 3 Open National Championships with a score of 97.2 and came in first place at the USSBA Group 3 Open State Competition. These mark the highest accolades that the Rancocas Valley Marching Band have ever received. The band also won state championships in 2010 in Group 3 Open with a score of 91.825 and receiving the captions best color guard, best music, best overall effect and best visual. On October 30, 2010 the band won first place at the Northern States Competition in Allentown, PA with a score of 95.900, also receiving caption awards for best percussion, best colorguard, best music and best overall effect. They beat many group 3 Open bands from around the region, in states such as New Jersey, Pennsylvania, Connecticut, New York and Virginia. In November 2010, the band won yet again and took home the title for USSBA Group 3 Open National champions with a score of 97.8. They also received best color guard, best music and best overall effect. The Red Devil marching band took home a caption of best music, as well as The Cadets award of excellence at New Jersey state championships on October 18, 2014 at High Point Solutions Stadium.

In May 1971, the school's speech and drama team won 8 individual events, plus best drama and best actor awards at the Rutgers University Camden Speech Festival. In April 1972, a team member won first place in dramatic interpretation at the National Forensic League's New Jersey District Championships.

== Notable alumni ==
Some of the notable alumni from Rancocas Valley include:

- Shaun Bradley (born 1997), American football linebacker for the Philadelphia Eagles
- Kelsi Dahlia (born 1994, class of 2012), competition swimmer specializing in the butterfly who won a gold medal at the 2016 Summer Olympics in the women's 4x100 medley relay
- Pat Fidelia (born 1959), former professional soccer player
- Ryan Finley (born 1991), professional soccer player
- Irving Fryar (born 1962), professional football player who played for the Philadelphia Eagles
- Dan Gakeler (born 1964), former MLB pitcher who played for the Detroit Tigers
- Ron Gassert (1940–2022, class of 1957), professional football player who played in the NFL for the Green Bay Packers
- Jordan Gershowitz (born 1987, class of 2006), television writer, executive producer and author
- Franco Harris (1950–2022, class of 1968), Hall of Fame NFL running back who played for the Pittsburgh Steelers
- Pete Harris (1956–2006), All-American football player at Penn State University; younger brother of Franco Harris
- Ben Ijalana (born 1989, class of 2007), former NFL offensive lineman who played for the Indianapolis Colts and the New York Jets
- Leigh Jaynes (class of 1999), freestyle wrestler
- Erika Kemp (born 1995), distance runner, who specializes in the marathon and half marathon
- Eric Lofton (born 1993), Canadian Football League offensive lineman for the Winnipeg Blue Bombers
- Andrew Macurdy, politician who has represented the 21st Legislative District in the New Jersey General Assembly since January 2026
- Robert L. Ord III (born 1940, class of 1958), U.S. Army lieutenant general
- Barbara Park (1947-2013, class of 1965), best-selling author of the "Junie B. Jones" series of children's books
- Robert C. Shinn Jr. (1937–2023), politician who represented the 8th Legislative District in the New Jersey General Assembly from 1985 to 1994
- Michelle Smith (born 1972/1973, class of 1990), fashion designer
- Alonzo Spellman (born 1971, class of 1989), former NFL defensive tackle and 1st-round draft pick (Chicago Bears)
- DeMya Walker (born 1977, class of 1995), professional basketball player, in the WNBA (Sacramento Monarchs)
- Bryan Ward (born 1972, class of 1990), former Major League Baseball pitcher who played for the Chicago White Sox, Philadelphia Phillies and the Anaheim Angels

== Administration ==
Core members of the administration for the district and school are:

- Karen Benton, superintendent
- Kristen Mari, business administrator and board secretary
- Shawn Counard, principal (with two assistant principals)

== Board of education ==
The district's board of education, comprised of nine members, sets policy and oversees the fiscal and educational operation of the district through its administration. As a Type II school district, the board's trustees are elected directly by voters to serve three-year terms of office on a staggered basis, with three seats up for election each year held (since 2012) as part of the November general election. The board appoints a superintendent to oversee the district's day-to-day operations and a business administrator to supervise the business functions of the district. The seats on the board are assigned to the constituent municipalities based on population, with each district guaranteed a minimum of one seat. Of the nine seats, three are allocated to Lumberton, two each to Mount Holly and Westampton, and one each to Eastampton and Hainesport. The president and vice president are elected from its members at the annual reorganization meeting for a one-year term.
