= Jennifer Rogers (wrestler) =

American freestyle wrestler

Personal information
- Full name: Jennifer Page Rogers
- Born: 14 March 1993 (age 33) Sacramento, United States
- Height: 1.65 m (5 ft 5 in)
- Weight: 59 kg (130 lb; 9.3 st)

Sport
- Country: United States
- Sport: Women's freestyle wrestling
- Event: 59 kg
Medal record
Women's freestyle wrestling
Representing United States
World Championships
Bronze medal – third place	2023 Belgrade	59 kg
Pan American Championships
Gold medal – first place	2015 Chile	60 kg
Gold medal – first place	2021 Guatemala	65 kg
Dan Kolov – Nikola Petrov Tournament
Bronze medal – third place	2022 Tarnovo	62 kg
Bronze medal – third place	2023 Sofia	62 kg
Grand Prix
Gold medal – first place	2023 Budapest	59 kg
World Juniors Championships
Bronze medal – third place	2013 Sofia	63 kg

Jennifer Rogers (born 14 March 1993) is an American freestyle wrestler competing in the 59 kg division.

== Career ==
In 2023, Jennifer Rogers competed in the women's 59 kg event at the 2023 World Wrestling Championships held in Belgrade, Serbia and won one of bronze medals.

== Achievements ==
Year	Tournament	Location	Result	Event
2023	World Championships	Belgrade, Serbia	3rd	Freestyle 59 kg
