= Sonam Malik =

Indian wrestler (born 2002)

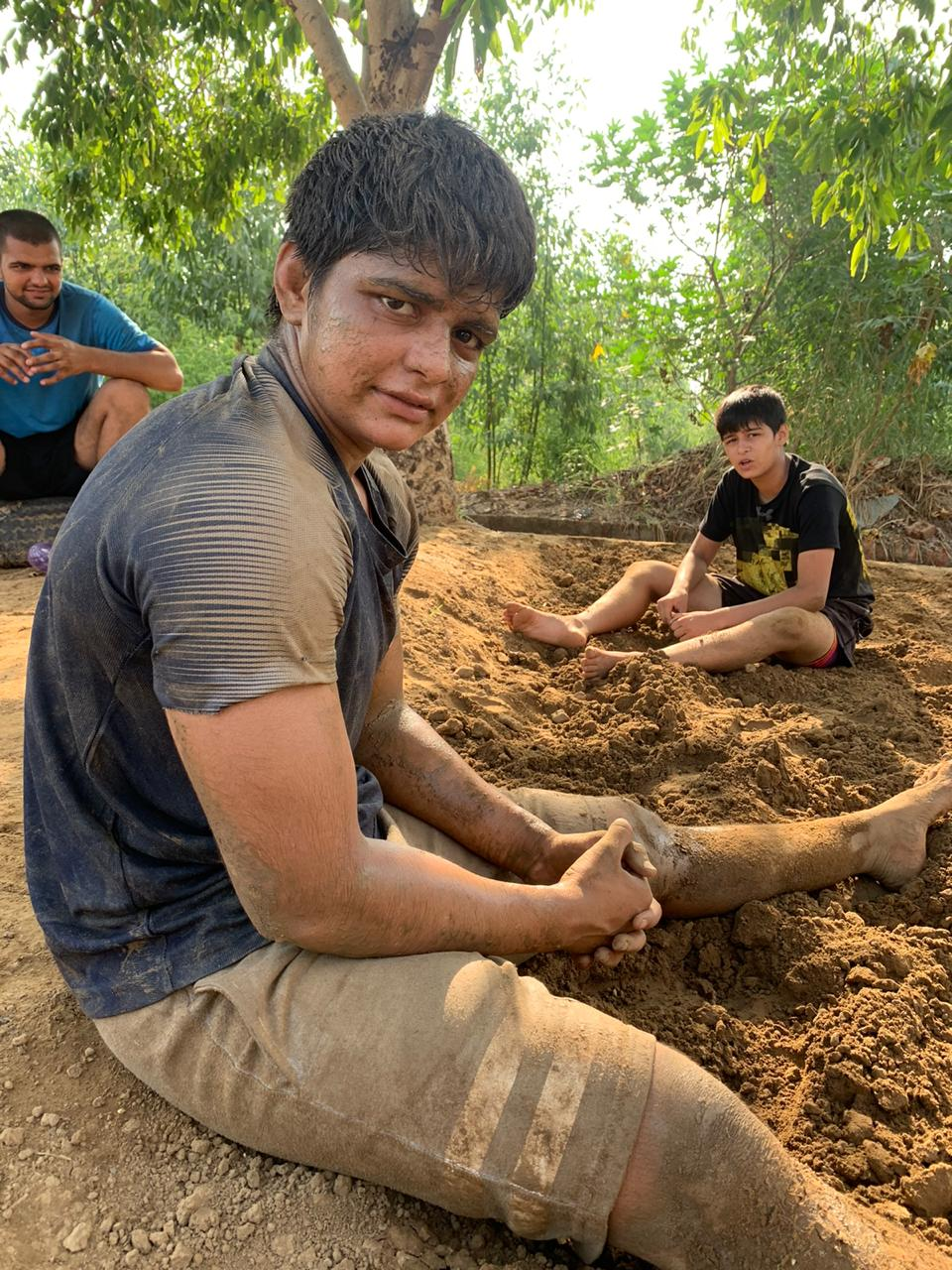

Personal information
- Nationality: Indian
- Born: 15 April 2002 (age 24) Sonipat, Haryana, India

Sport
- Sport: Freestyle Wrestling
- Event: 62 kg
Medal record
Women's freestyle wrestling
Representing India
Asian Games
| Bronze medal – third place | 2022 Hangzhou | 62 kg |
Asian Championships
| Bronze medal – third place | 2023 Astana | 62 kg |
World Junior Championships
| Silver medal – second place | 2022 Sofia | 62 kg |
World Cadet Championships
| Gold medal – first place | 2017 Athens | 62 kg |
| Bronze medal – third place | 2018 Zagreb | 62 kg |
| Gold medal – first place | 2019 Sofia | 62 kg |

Sonam Malik (born 15 April 2002) is an Indian woman wrestler from Sonipat, Haryana. She won a gold medal at the National Games, and two gold medals at the World Cadet Wrestling Championship. She won a bronze in 62 kg in the 2022 Asian Games.

== Personal life and background ==
Malik was born on 15 April 2002 in Madina village of Sonipat, Haryana. Her father and a cousin are wrestlers, who had influence in Malik's decision to pursue the sport. She joined for coaching under coach Ajmer Malik at the Netaji Subhash Chandra Bose Sports Complex in her village. Facilities were inadequate to start with and the coaching academy did not have mats to practice on. The players had to train on the ground, but the ground would turn muddy in rainy days, forcing the players to practice on roads.

In 2017, the wrestler's shoulder was injured in a tournament. The treatment continued for about one-and-half years. In addition to her sports career, Malik is currently pursuing her bachelor of arts degree.

== Professional career ==
Malik won a gold medal at the National School Games in 2016. In 2017, she won a silver in the Cadet National Championship, a gold in the World School Games, a bronze medal in the Cadet Asian Wrestling Championship and finished with a gold in the Cadet World Wrestling Championship. In 2018, she won bronze medals at the Cadet Asian Wrestling Championship and the Cadet World Wrestling Championship. In 2019, Malik again won the gold medal at the Cadet World Wrestling Championship.

In 2020, she defeated 2016 Rio Olympics bronze medallist Sakshi Malik twice. The first of these came in January in trials for the Asian Championship and later for selection to the Asian Olympic Qualifiers in February.

Malik won the silver medal in her event at the 2022 World Junior Wrestling Championships held in Sofia, Bulgaria. She competed in the 62 kg event at the 2022 World Wrestling Championships held in Belgrade, Serbia.

Malik won one of the bronze medals in the women's 62 kg event at the 2022 Asian Games held in Hangzhou, China. She defeated Long Jia of China in her bronze medal match.
