= 2021 World Wrestling Championships – Women's freestyle 62 kg =

Wrestling competitions

Women's freestyle 62 kg at the 2021 World Championships
- Venue: Nye Jordal Amfi
- Dates: 4–5 October 2021
- Competitors: 17 from 17 nations

Medalists
gold medal	Aisuluu Tynybekova	Kyrgyzstan
silver medal	Kayla Miracle	United States
bronze medal	Nonoka Ozaki	Japan
bronze medal	Enkhbatyn Gantuyaa	Mongolia

The women's freestyle 62 kilograms is a competition featured at the 2021 World Wrestling Championships, and was held in Oslo, Norway on 4 and 5 October.

This freestyle wrestling competition consists of a single-elimination tournament, with a repechage used to determine the winner of two bronze medals. The two finalists face off for gold and silver medals. Each wrestler who loses to one of the two finalists moves into the repechage, culminating in a pair of bronze medal matches featuring the semifinal losers each facing the remaining repechage opponent from their half of the bracket.

== Results ==
Legend

- F — Won by fall
- WO — Won by walkover

=== Final ===
Final
Aisuluu Tynybekova (KGZ)	7
Kayla Miracle (USA)	0

=== Top half ===
Round of 32

Round of 16
Aisuluu Tynybekova (KGZ)	6
Nonoka Ozaki (JPN)	4
Merve Karadeniz (TUR)	2
Veranika Ivanova (BLR)	13
Ayaulym Kassymova (KAZ)	1
Ilona Prokopevniuk (UKR)	12
~~Nilukshi Perera (SRI)~~
Ana Godinez (CAN)	WO

Quarterfinals
Aisuluu Tynybekova (KGZ)	6^{F}
Veranika Ivanova (BLR)	6
Ilona Prokopevniuk (UKR)	8^{F}
Ana Godinez (CAN)	0

Semifinals
Aisuluu Tynybekova (KGZ)	5
Ilona Prokopevniuk (UKR)	2

=== Bottom half ===
Round of 32
Luisa Niemesch (GER)	2
Sangeeta Phogat (IND)	5

Round of 16
Kayla Miracle (USA)	14
Enkhbatyn Gantuyaa (MGL)	4
Sung Hwa-young (KOR)	0
Alina Kasabieva (RWF)	4
Alejandra Romero (MEX)	0
Aleksandra Wólczyńska (POL)	4
Sangeeta Phogat (IND)	4
Laís Nunes (BRA)	6

Quarterfinals
Kayla Miracle (USA)	13
Alina Kasabieva (RWF)	2
Aleksandra Wólczyńska (POL)	2
Laís Nunes (BRA)	3

Semifinals
Kayla Miracle (USA)	2
Laís Nunes (BRA)	0

=== Repechage ===
Repechage round 2
Nonoka Ozaki (JPN)	2
Veranika Ivanova (BLR)	0
Enkhbatyn Gantuyaa (MGL)	12
Alina Kasabieva (RWF)	8

Bronze medals
Nonoka Ozaki (JPN)	12
Ilona Prokopevniuk (UKR)	0
Enkhbatyn Gantuyaa (MGL)	7
Laís Nunes (BRA)	6

== Final standing ==
Rank	Athlete
1st place, gold medalist(s)	Aisuluu Tynybekova (KGZ)
2nd place, silver medalist(s)	Kayla Miracle (USA)
3rd place, bronze medalist(s)	Nonoka Ozaki (JPN)
3rd place, bronze medalist(s)	Enkhbatyn Gantuyaa (MGL)
5	Ilona Prokopevniuk (UKR)
5	Laís Nunes (BRA)
7	Alina Kasabieva (RWF)
8	Ana Godinez (CAN)
9	Veranika Ivanova (BLR)
10	Sangeeta Phogat (IND)
11	Aleksandra Wólczyńska (POL)
12	Luisa Niemesch (GER)
13	Merve Karadeniz (TUR)
14	Ayaulym Kassymova (KAZ)
15	Sung Hwa-young (KOR)
16	Alejandra Romero (MEX)
—	Nilukshi Perera (SRI)
