= 2015 World Wrestling Championships – Women's freestyle 60 kg =

Women's freestyle 60 kg at the 2015 World Championships
- Venue: Orleans Arena
- Dates: 11 September 2015
- Competitors: 15 from 15 nations

Medalists
gold medal	Oksana Herhel	Ukraine
silver medal	Sükheegiin Tserenchimed	Mongolia
bronze medal	Dzhanan Manolova	Bulgaria
bronze medal	Leigh Jaynes	United States

The women's freestyle 60 kilograms is a competition featured at the 2015 World Wrestling Championships, and was held in Las Vegas, United States on 11 September 2015.

This freestyle wrestling competition consisted of a single-elimination tournament, with a repechage used to determine the winners of two bronze medals. The two finalists faced off for gold and silver medals. Each wrestler who lost to one of the two finalists moved into the repechage, culminating in a pair of bronze medal matches, featuring the semifinal losers each facing the remaining repechage opponent from their half of the bracket.

Each bout consists of a single round within a six-minute limit, including two halves of three minutes. The wrestler who scores more points is the winner.

The Ukrainian Oksana Herhel won the gold medal after beating Sükheegiin Tserenchimed from Mongolia in the final 10–7. Dzhanan Manolova of Bulgaria and Leigh Jaynes from the United States shared the bronze medals. Manolova beat Sun of China 3–1 and Jaynes beat Netreba from Azerbaijan 4–4 on criteria.

== Results ==
Legend

- F — Won by fall

=== Main bracket ===
Round of 16
Tayla Ford (NZL)	5
Sükheegiin Tserenchimed (MGL)	12
Svetlana Lipatova (RUS)	1
Veranika Ivanova (BLR)	5^{F}
Kiwa Sakae (JPN)	4
Dzhanan Manolova (BUL)	6
Oksana Herhel (UKR)	4^{F}
Breanne Graham (CAN)	0
Irina Netreba (AZE)	11
Hafize Şahin (TUR)	6
Sarita Mor (IND)	2
Emese Barka (HUN)	4
Leigh Jaynes (USA)	12
Madina Bakbergenova (KAZ)	0

Quarterfinals
Sun Yazhen (CHN)	2
Sükheegiin Tserenchimed (MGL)	12
Veranika Ivanova (BLR)	7
Dzhanan Manolova (BUL)	3^{F}
Oksana Herhel (UKR)	5
Irina Netreba (AZE)	4
Emese Barka (HUN)	5
Leigh Jaynes (USA)	10

Semifinals
Sükheegiin Tserenchimed (MGL)	10^{F}
Dzhanan Manolova (BUL)	0
Oksana Herhel (UKR)	4^{F}
Leigh Jaynes (USA)	0

Final
Sükheegiin Tserenchimed (MGL)	7
Oksana Herhel (UKR)	10

=== Repechage ===
Repechage round 1
Tayla Ford (NZL)	4
Sun Yazhen (CHN)	4^{F}
Breanne Graham (CAN)	5
Irina Netreba (AZE)	12

Bronze medals
Sun Yazhen (CHN)	1
Dzhanan Manolova (BUL)	3
Irina Netreba (AZE)	4
Leigh Jaynes (USA)	4
