= 2014 World Wrestling Championships – Women's freestyle 60 kg =

Women's freestyle 60 kg at the 2014 World Championships
- Venue: Gymnastics Sport Palace
- Dates: 10 September 2014
- Competitors: 16 from 16 nations

Medalists
gold medal	Sükheegiin Tserenchimed	Mongolia
silver medal	Yuliya Ratkevich	Azerbaijan
bronze medal	Natalia Golts	Russia
bronze medal	Taybe Yusein	Bulgaria

The women's freestyle 60 kilograms is a competition featured at the 2014 World Wrestling Championships, and was held in Tashkent, Uzbekistan on 10 September 2014.

This freestyle wrestling competition consisted of a single-elimination tournament, with a repechage used to determine the winners of two bronze medals. The two finalists faced off for gold and silver medals. Each wrestler who lost to one of the two finalists moved into the repechage, culminating in a pair of bronze medal matches featuring the semifinal losers each facing the remaining repechage opponent from their half of the bracket.

Each bout consists of a single round within a six-minute limit including two halves of three minutes. The wrestler who scores more points is the winner.

Sükheegiin Tserenchimed of Mongolia won the gold medal after dominating Yuliya Ratkevich from Azerbaijan in the final 11–2. Natalia Golts of Russia and Taybe Yusein of Bulgaria shared the bronze medals. Golts beat Petra Olli of Finland by superiority while Yusein beat Johanna Mattsson of Sweden 6–2.

== Results ==
Legend

- F — Won by fall

=== Main bracket ===
Round of 16
Luo Xiaojuan (CHN)	0
Petra Olli (FIN)	6
Sakshi Malik (IND)	15
Anta Sambou (SEN)	2
Jenna Burkert (USA)	0
Katsuki Sakagami (JPN)	10
Natalia Golts (RUS)	0
Sükheegiin Tserenchimed (MGL)	7
Marianna Sastin (HUN)	2
Michelle Fazzari (CAN)	3
Johanna Mattsson (SWE)	3
Yuliya Ratkevich (AZE)	5
Oksana Herhel (UKR)	4^{F}
Salomat Kuchimova (UZB)	0
Taybe Yusein (BUL)	11
Juliya Satymbekova (KAZ)	0

Quarterfinals
Petra Olli (FIN)	5
Sakshi Malik (IND)	3
Katsuki Sakagami (JPN)	2
Sükheegiin Tserenchimed (MGL)	10^{F}
Michelle Fazzari (CAN)	4
Yuliya Ratkevich (AZE)	8
Oksana Herhel (UKR)	7
Taybe Yusein (BUL)	12

Semifinals
Petra Olli (FIN)	0
Sükheegiin Tserenchimed (MGL)	5
Yuliya Ratkevich (AZE)	11
Taybe Yusein (BUL)	8

Final
Sükheegiin Tserenchimed (MGL)	12
Yuliya Ratkevich (AZE)	3

=== Repechage ===
Repechage round 1
Natalia Golts (RUS)	9
Katsuki Sakagami (JPN)	6
Johanna Mattsson (SWE)	6
Michelle Fazzari (CAN)	4

Bronze medals
Natalia Golts (RUS)	12
Petra Olli (FIN)	1
Johanna Mattsson (SWE)	0
Taybe Yusein (BUL)	6
