= Merve Karadeniz =

Turkish freestyle wrestler

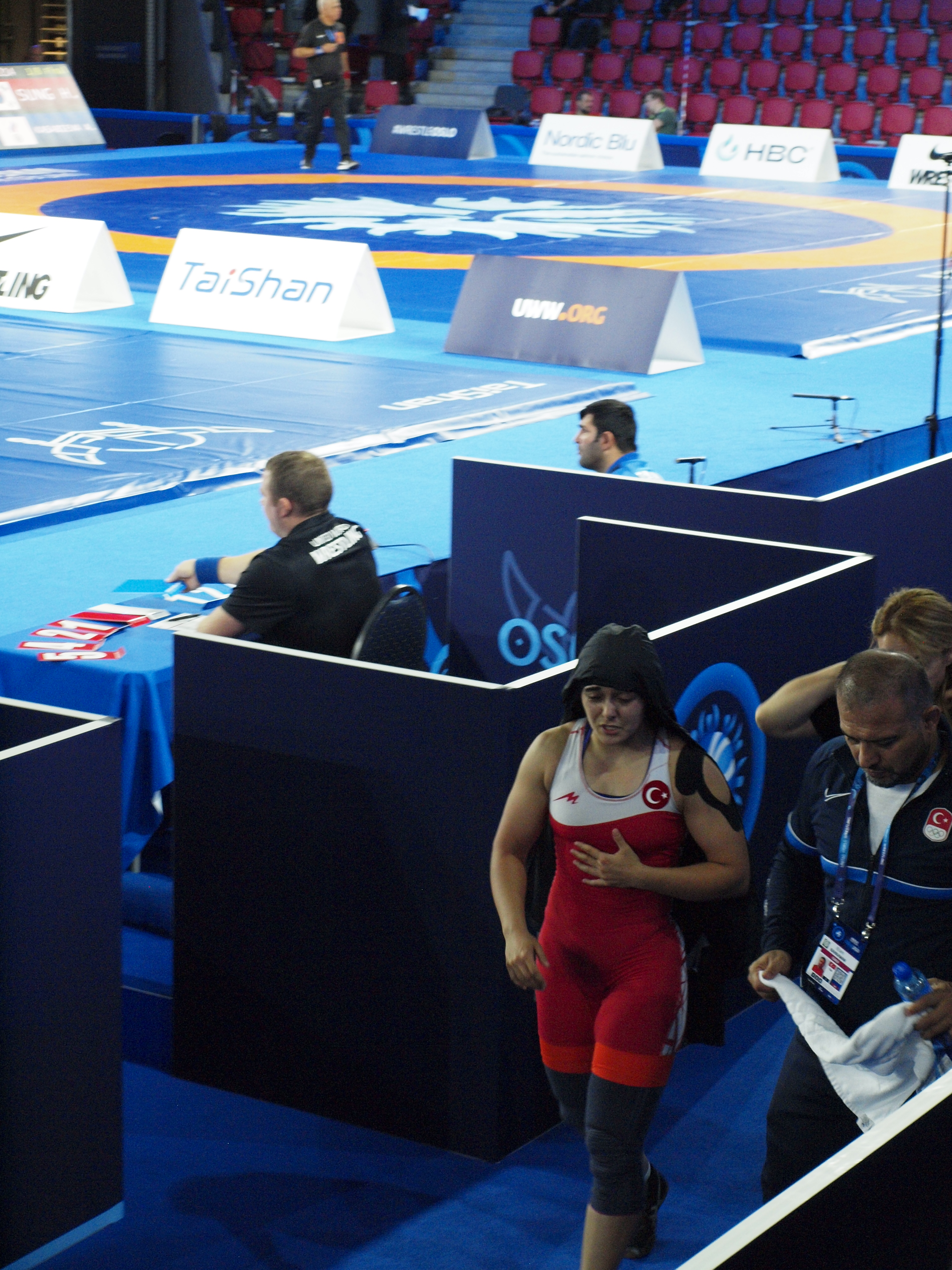
- Karadeniz in 2021

Personal information
- Nationality: Turkish
- Born: Turkey
- Home town: Karabük, Turkey

Sport
- Country: Turkey
- Sport: Women's freestyle wrestling
- Event: 62 kg

Merve Karadeniz is a Turkish female freestyle wrestler, competing in the 62 kg division. She competes also in beach wrestling.

== Sports career ==
Karadeniz became champion at the Turkish Junior Women's Wrestling Championship held in Antalya in April 2021.

She placed 13th in the 62 kg event at the 2021 World Wrestling Championships in Oslo, Norway. She competed in the 62 kg event at the 2021 Islamic Solidarity Games in Konya, Tuyrkey.

She reached the quarterfinals in the 52 kg event at the 2022 European U23 Wrestling Championships in Plovdiv, Bulgaria.

Karadeniz won the gold medal in the 60 kg event at the 2nd Beach Wrestling World Series in Singapore in June 2023. She was also honored with the "Top Technique" award. She won the silver medal in the 62 kg event at the 2023 Yasar Dogu Tournament in Istanbul, Turkey.
