= Shaun Bradley =

American football player (born 1997)

No. 54
- Position: Linebacker

Personal information
- Born: April 8, 1997 (age 29); Mount Holly, New Jersey, U.S.
- Listed height: 6 ft 1 in (1.85 m)
- Listed weight: 240 lb (109 kg)

Career information
- High school: Rancocas Valley Regional (Mount Holly)
- College: Temple (2016–2019)
- NFL draft: 2020: 6th round, 196th overall pick

Career history
- Philadelphia Eagles (2020–2023); Houston Texans (2024)*; Kansas City Chiefs (2025)*
- * Offseason or practice squad member only

Career NFL statistics as of 2024
- Total tackles: 45
- Pass deflections: 1
- Stats at Pro Football Reference

Shaun Russell Ellis-Bradley (born April 8, 1997) is an American professional football linebacker. He played college football for the Temple Owls and was selected by the Eagles in the sixth round of the 2020 NFL draft.

Raised in Mount Holly, New Jersey, he played prep football, in addition to competing in basketball and track, as a student at Rancocas Valley Regional High School.

== College career ==
While mulling offers from Delaware, Rhode Island and others, Bradley committed to Temple too late to be on scholarship, leading him to grayshirt the 2015 season, attending classes at Rowan College at Burlington County before being a part of Temple's 2016 signing class.

== Professional career ==
Pre-draft measurables
Height	Weight	Arm length	Hand span	40-yard dash	10-yard split	20-yard split	20-yard shuttle	Three-cone drill	Vertical jump	Broad jump	Bench press
6 ft 0 5/8 in (1.84 m)	235 lb (107 kg)	31 3/4 in (0.81 m)	9 1/2 in (0.24 m)	4.51 s	1.54 s	2.64 s	4.24 s	7.07 s	32.5 in (0.83 m)	10 ft 1 in (3.07 m)	14 reps
All values from NFL Combine

=== Philadelphia Eagles ===
Bradley was selected by the Philadelphia Eagles in the sixth round with the 196th overall pick of the 2020 NFL draft. On January 1, 2021, Bradley was placed on injured reserve. On December 25, 2021, Bradley was placed on the COVID list. He was activated on December 30.

In 2022, the Eagles made Super Bowl LVII without Bradley, who had suffered a season–ending wrist injury. The Eagles lost 38–35 to the Kansas City Chiefs.

On August 12, 2023, in the Eagles' preseason game against the Baltimore Ravens, Bradley suffered a torn Achilles tendon while handling punt–blocking duties. As a result, he was ruled out for the entirety of the 2023 season.

=== Houston Texans ===
On October 2, 2024, Bradley signed with the Houston Texans practice squad. He was released on November 5.

=== Kansas City Chiefs ===
On January 9, 2025, Bradley signed a reserve/future contract with the Kansas City Chiefs.

On May 1, 2025, Bradley was released by the Chiefs.

== NFL career statistics ==
=== Regular season ===
Year	Team	Games		Tackles					Interceptions						Fumbles	
Year	Team	GP	GS	Cmb	Solo	Ast	Sck	Sfty	PD	Int	Yds	Avg	Lng	TD	FF	FR
2020	PHI	15	0	15	9	6	0	0	0	0	0	0.0	0	0	0	0
2021	PHI	15	1	23	15	8	0	0	1	0	0	0	0	0	0	0
2022	PHI	15	0	7	5	2	0	0	0	0	0	0	0	0	0	0
Career		45	1	45	29	16	0.0	0	1	0	0	0	0	0	0	0
