= Wrestling at the 2026 Asian Games – Women's freestyle 62 kg =

Women's freestyle 62 kg at the 2026 Asian Games
- Venue: Inae Sports Center
- Date: 1 October 2026
- Competitors: 12 from 12 nations

Medalists
gold medal	Nonoka Ozaki	Japan
silver medal	Kim Ok-ju	North Korea
bronze medal	Togtokhyn Altjin	Mongolia
bronze medal	Zhang Qi	China

The women's freestyle 62 kilograms wrestling competition at the 2026 Asian Games in Nagoya was held on 1 October 2026 at the Inae Sports Center.

This freestyle wrestling competition consists of a single-elimination tournament, with a repechage used to determine the winner of two bronze medals. The two finalists face off for gold and silver medals. Each wrestler who loses to one of the two finalists moves into the repechage, culminating in a pair of bronze medal matches featuring the semifinal losers each facing the remaining repechage opponent from their half of the bracket.

== Schedule ==
All times are Japan Standard Time (UTC+09:00)

Date	Time	Event
Thursday, 1 October 2026	10:30	1/8 finals
Thursday, 1 October 2026	10:30	1/4 finals
Thursday, 1 October 2026	10:30	Semifinals
Thursday, 1 October 2026	10:30	Repechages
Thursday, 1 October 2026	18:00	Finals

== Results ==
Legend

- F — Won by fall

=== Main bracket ===
1/8 finals
Sushila Chand (NEP)	0
Togtokhyn Altjin (MGL)	10
Mansi Ahlawat (IND)	6
Irina Kuznetsova (KAZ)	1
Kim Ok-ju (PRK)	2^{F}
Chea Kanha (CAM)	0
Mukhayyo Narzilloeva (UZB)	0
Zhang Qi (CHN)	10

1/4 finals
Nonoka Ozaki (JPN)	12
Togtokhyn Altjin (MGL)	0
Mansi Ahlawat (IND)	5^{F}
Jo Su-been (KOR)	0
Pai Hsin-ping (TPE)	0
Kim Ok-ju (PRK)	12
Zhang Qi (CHN)	10
Sezim Zhumanazarova (KGZ)	0

Semifinals
Nonoka Ozaki (JPN)	6
Mansi Ahlawat (IND)	0
Kim Ok-ju (PRK)	5
Zhang Qi (CHN)	1

Final
Nonoka Ozaki (JPN)	3
Kim Ok-ju (PRK)	0

=== Repechage ===
Repechage
Chea Kanha (CAM)	0
Pai Hsin-ping (TPE)	4^{F}

Bronze medal matches
Togtokhyn Altjin (MGL)	5
Mansi Ahlawat (IND)	2
Pai Hsin-ping (TPE)	0
Zhang Qi (CHN)	10

== Final standing ==
Rank	Athlete
1st place, gold medalist(s)	Nonoka Ozaki (JPN)
2nd place, silver medalist(s)	Kim Ok-ju (PRK)
3rd place, bronze medalist(s)	Togtokhyn Altjin (MGL)
3rd place, bronze medalist(s)	Zhang Qi (CHN)
5	Mansi Ahlawat (IND)
5	Pai Hsin-ping (TPE)
7	Irina Kuznetsova (KAZ)
8	Jo Su-been (KOR)
9	Chea Kanha (CAM)
10	Sushila Chand (NEP)
11	Mukhayyo Narzilloeva (UZB)
12	Sezim Zhumanazarova (KGZ)
