= Enkhbatyn Gantuyaa =

Mongolian freestyle wrestler

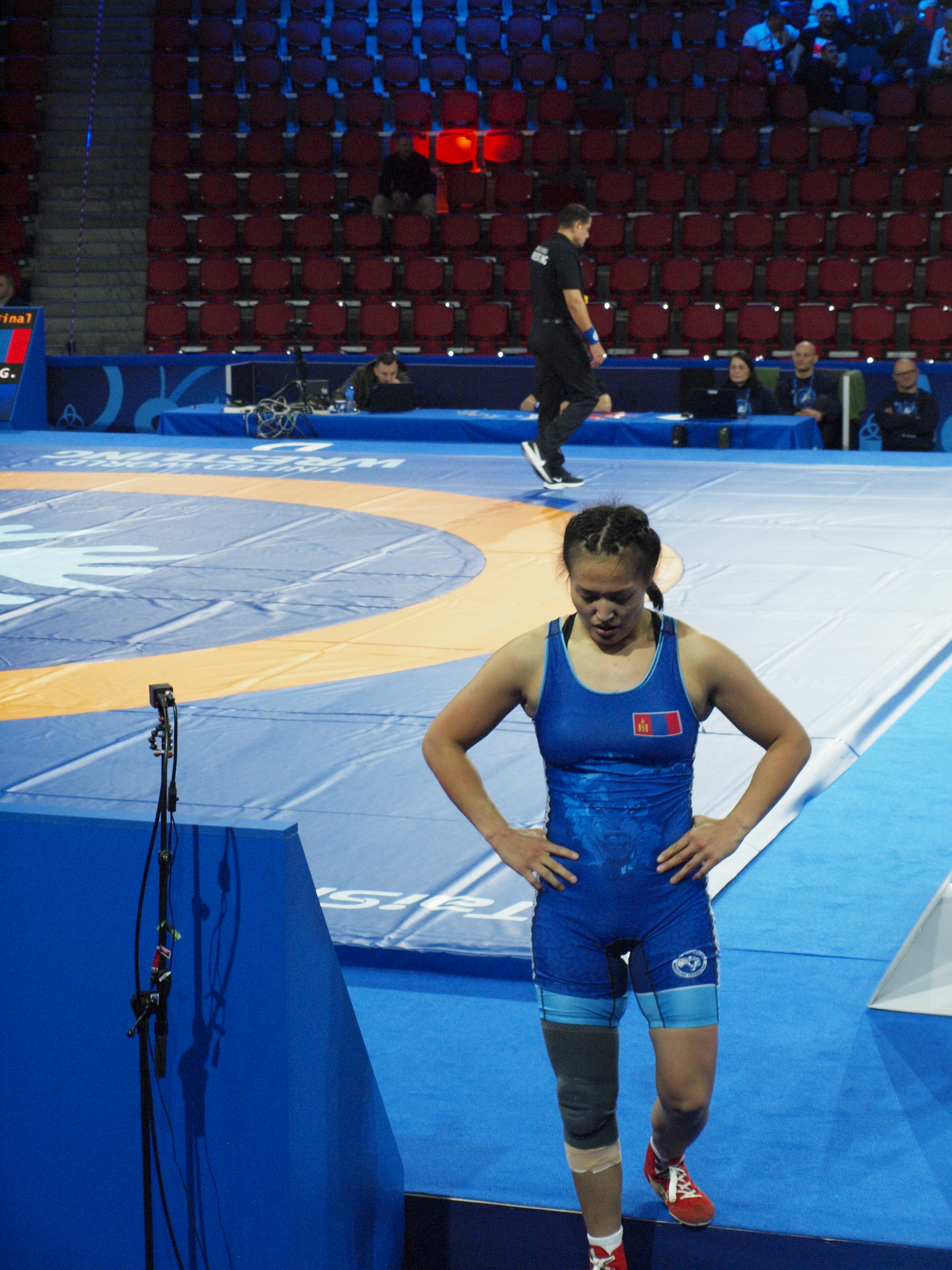
- 2021 World Wrestling Championships

Personal information
- Native name: Энхбатын Гантуяа
- Nationality: Mongolia
- Born: 26 May 1995 (age 31) Mongolia

Sport
- Country: Mongolia
- Sport: Wrestling
- Weight class: 62 kg
- Event: Freestyle
Medal record
Women's freestyle wrestling
Representing Mongolia
World Championships
Bronze medal – third place	2021 Oslo	62 kg
World Cup
Bronze medal – third place	2017 Cheboksary	60 kg
Asian Championships
Bronze medal – third place	2016 Bangkok	58 kg
Golden Grand Prix Ivan Yarygin
Silver medal – second place	2021 Krasnoyarsk	62 kg
Silver medal – second place	2018 Krasnoyarsk	57 kg
Bronze medal – third place	2017 Krasnoyarsk	58 kg
Bolat Turlykhanov Cup
Bronze medal – third place	2022 Almaty	62 kg
U23 World Championships
Bronze medal – third place	2018 Bucharest	62 kg
Bronze medal – third place	2017 Bydgoszcz	60 kg
Asian Junior Championships
Silver medal – second place	2013 Phuket	59 kg
Asian Cadets Championships
Bronze medal – third place	2012 Bishkek	56 kg

Enkhbatyn Gantuyaa (Mongolian: Энхбатын Гантуяа, born 26 May 1995) is a Mongolian freestyle wrestler. She won one of the bronze medals in the women's 62 kg event at the 2021 World Wrestling Championships in Oslo, Norway.
