= Ana Godinez =

Canadian freestyle wrestler

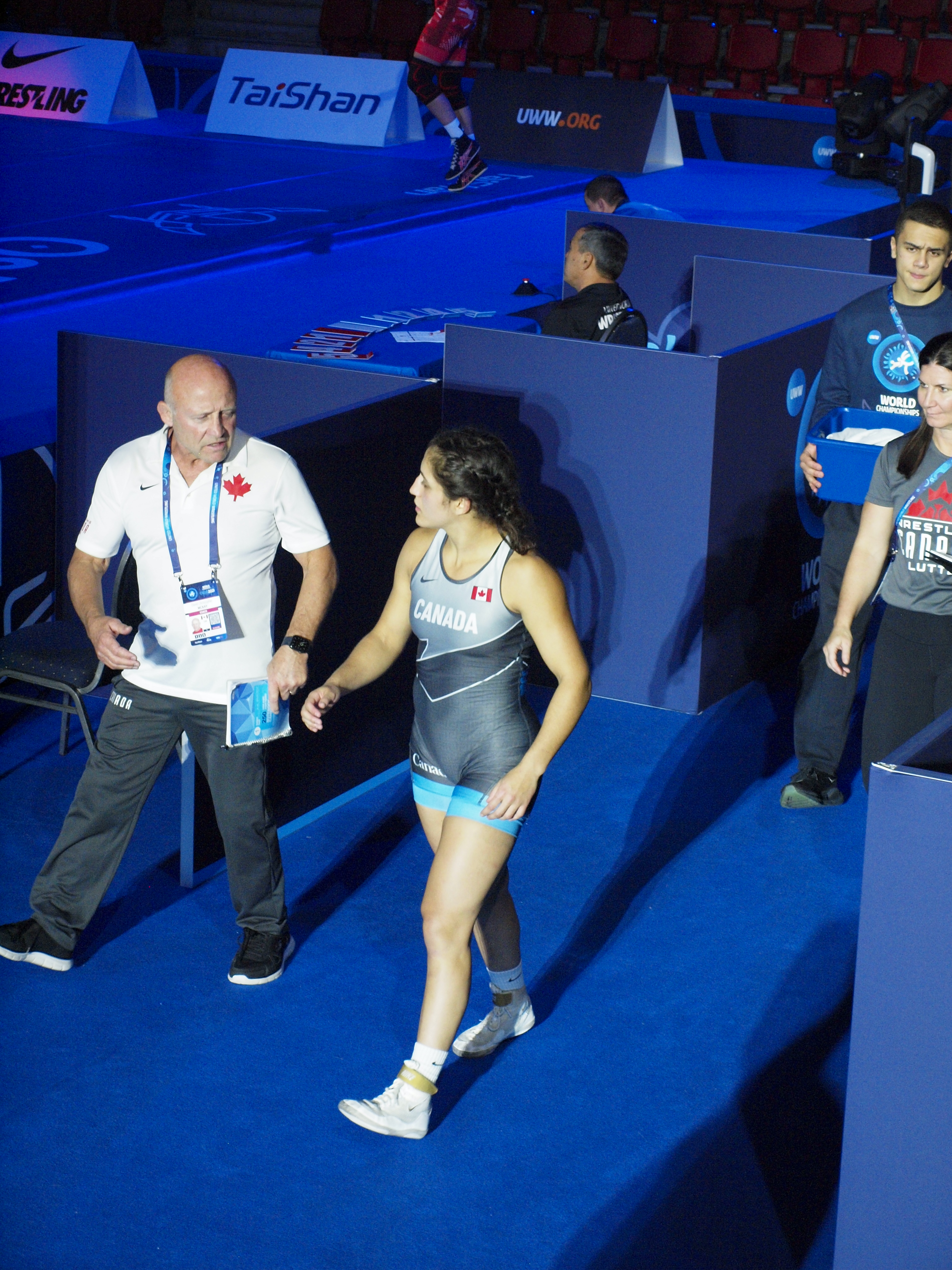

Personal information
- Full name: Ana Paula Godinez Gonzalez
- Nationality: Canadian
- Born: November 26, 1999 (age 26) Aguascalientes, Mexico
- Home town: Burnaby, British Columbia, Canada

Sport
- Country: Canada
- Sport: Amateur wrestling
- Weight class: 62 kg
- Event: Freestyle
- Club: Burnaby Mountain Wrestling Club
Medal record
Women's freestyle wrestling
Representing Canada
Pan American Championships
Gold medal – first place	2022 Acapulco	62 kg
Gold medal – first place	2023 Buenos Aires	62 kg
Gold medal – first place	2025 Monterrey	62 kg
Silver medal – second place	2024 Acapulco	62 kg
Grand Prix
Bronze medal – third place	2025 Budapest	62 kg
Commonwealth Games
Silver medal – second place	2022 Birmingham	62 kg
World U23 Championships
Gold medal – first place	2021 Belgrade	62 kg
Bronze medal – third place	2022 Pontevedra	62 kg
World Junior Championships
Bronze medal – third place	2019 Tallinn	62 kg

Ana Paula Godinez Gonzalez (born November 26, 1999) is a Canadian freestyle wrestler. She is a four-time medallist, including three gold medals, at the Pan American Wrestling Championships. She won the silver medal in the women's 62 kg event at the 2022 Commonwealth Games held in Birmingham, England.

== Career ==
Godinez won one of the bronze medals in the women's 62 kg event at the 2019 World Junior Wrestling Championships held in Tallinn, Estonia. A month later, she competed in the women's 62 kg event at the 2019 World Wrestling Championships held in Nur-Sultan, Kazakhstan.

Godinez won the silver medal in her event at the 2021 Poland Open held in Warsaw, Poland. She competed in the women's 62 kg event at the 2021 World Wrestling Championships held in Oslo, Norway. A month later, she won the gold medal in her event at the 2021 U23 World Wrestling Championships held in Belgrade, Serbia.

Godinez won the gold medal in the women's 62 kg event at the 2022 Pan American Wrestling Championships held in Acapulco, Mexico. She lost her bronze medal match in the 62 kg event at the 2022 World Wrestling Championships held in Belgrade, Serbia. A month later, she won one of the bronze medals in her event at the 2022 U23 World Wrestling Championships held in Pontevedra, Spain.

Godinez won the gold medal in her event at the Grand Prix de France Henri Deglane 2023 held in Nice, France. A few months later, she also won the gold medal in her event at the 2023 Pan American Wrestling Championships held in Buenos Aires, Argentina.

She won the silver medal in her event at the 2024 Pan American Wrestling Championships held in Acapulco, Mexico. A few days later, at the Pan American Wrestling Olympic Qualification Tournament held in Acapulco, Mexico, she earned a quota place for Canada for the 2024 Summer Olympics held in Paris, France. Godinez lost her bronze medal match in the women's 62 kg event at the Olympics.

== Personal life ==
Born in Mexico, Godinez's family emigrated to Canada after a kidnapping threat. Her sister Karla Godinez is also a competitive wrestler. Her sister Loopy Godínez is a professional mixed martial artist.

== Achievements ==
Year	Tournament	Location	Result	Event
2022	Pan American Wrestling Championships	Acapulco, Mexico	1st	Freestyle 62 kg
2022	Commonwealth Games	Birmingham, England	2nd	Freestyle 62 kg
2023	Pan American Wrestling Championships	Buenos Aires, Argentina	1st	Freestyle 62 kg
2024	Pan American Wrestling Championships	Acapulco, Mexico	2nd	Freestyle 62 kg
2025	Pan American Wrestling Championships	Monterrey, Mexico	1st	Freestyle 62 kg
