= 2025 World Wrestling Championships – Women's freestyle 59 kg =

Wrestling competitions

Women's freestyle 59 kg at the 2025 World Championships
- Venue: Arena Zagreb
- Dates: 15–16 September 2025
- Competitors: 22 from 20 nations

Medalists
gold medal	Sakura Onishi	Japan
silver medal	Mariia Vynnyk	Ukraine
bronze medal	Togtokhyn Altjin	Mongolia
bronze medal	Laurence Beauregard	Canada

The women's freestyle 59 kilograms is a competition featured at the 2025 World Wrestling Championships, and was held in Zagreb, Croatia on 15 and 16 September 2025.

This freestyle wrestling competition consists of a single-elimination tournament, with a repechage used to determine the winner of two bronze medals. The two finalists face off for gold and silver medals. Each wrestler who loses to one of the two finalists moves into the repechage, culminating in a pair of bronze medal matches, featuring the semifinal losers each facing the remaining repechage opponent from their half of the bracket.

== Results ==
Legend

- F — Won by fall

=== Final ===
Final
Sakura Onishi (JPN)	17^{F}
Mariia Vynnyk (UKR)	8

=== Top half ===
Round of 32
Viktoriia Khusainova (KAZ)	12^{F}
Zeltzin Hernández (MEX)	1
Laylokhon Sobirova (UZB)	2
Nadzeya Bulanaya (UWW)	2
Sarika Malik (IND)	4
Lydia Pérez (ESP)	2

Round of 16
Elena Brugger (GER)	2
Hong Pyol (PRK)	1
Viktoriia Khusainova (KAZ)	1
Togtokhyn Altjin (MGL)	9
Sakura Onishi (JPN)	10
Laylokhon Sobirova (UZB)	0
Sarika Malik (IND)	0
Anastasiia Sidelnikova (UWW)	12

Quarterfinals
Elena Brugger (GER)	9
Togtokhyn Altjin (MGL)	5^{F}
Sakura Onishi (JPN)	12^{F}
Anastasiia Sidelnikova (UWW)	0

Semifinals
Togtokhyn Altjin (MGL)	0
Sakura Onishi (JPN)	6^{F}

=== Bottom half ===
Round of 32
Victoria Chhen (AUS)	0
Arian Carpio (PHI)	7
Jacarra Winchester (USA)	0
Liang Hong (CHN)	10^{F}
Othelie Høie (NOR)	11
Gunay Gurbanova (AZE)	5

Round of 16
Laurence Beauregard (CAN)	10
Arian Carpio (PHI)	0
Liang Hong (CHN)	0
Bediha Gün (TUR)	12
Jumoke Adekoye (NGR)	2
Othelie Høie (NOR)	3
Mariia Vynnyk (UKR)	10
Erika Bognár (HUN)	0

Quarterfinals
Laurence Beauregard (CAN)	6
Bediha Gün (TUR)	6
Othelie Høie (NOR)	0
Mariia Vynnyk (UKR)	11

Semifinals
Laurence Beauregard (CAN)	5
Mariia Vynnyk (UKR)	10

=== Repechage ===
Repechage round 2
Laylokhon Sobirova (UZB)	5
Anastasiia Sidelnikova (UWW)	5
Erika Bognár (HUN)	1
Othelie Høie (NOR)	9

Bronze medals
Anastasiia Sidelnikova (UWW)	4
Togtokhyn Altjin (MGL)	8
Othelie Høie (NOR)	2
Laurence Beauregard (CAN)	4^{F}

== Final standing ==
Rank	Athlete
1st place, gold medalist(s)	Sakura Onishi (JPN)
2nd place, silver medalist(s)	Mariia Vynnyk (UKR)
3rd place, bronze medalist(s)	Togtokhyn Altjin (MGL)
3rd place, bronze medalist(s)	Laurence Beauregard (CAN)
5	Anastasiia Sidelnikova (UWW)
5	Othelie Høie (NOR)
7	Viktoriia Khusainova (KAZ)
8	Liang Hong (CHN)
9	Bediha Gün (TUR)
10	Laylokhon Sobirova (UZB)
11	Elena Brugger (GER)
12	Arian Carpio (PHI)
13	Sarika Malik (IND)
14	Gunay Gurbanova (AZE)
15	Nadzeya Bulanaya (UWW)
16	Jumoke Adekoye (NGR)
17	Lydia Pérez (ESP)
18	Hong Pyol (PRK)
19	Erika Bognár (HUN)
20	Zeltzin Hernández (MEX)
21	Victoria Chhen (AUS)
22	Jacarra Winchester (USA)
