= Alonzo Spellman =

American football player (born 1971)

No. 90
- Position: Defensive end

Personal information
- Born: September 27, 1971 (age 55); Mount Holly, New Jersey, U.S.
- Listed height: 6 ft 4 in (1.93 m)
- Listed weight: 285 lb (129 kg)

Career information
- High school: Rancocas Valley Regional (Mount Holly)
- College: Ohio State
- NFL draft: 1992: 1st round, 22nd overall pick

Career history
- Chicago Bears (1992–1997); Dallas Cowboys (1999–2000); Detroit Lions (2001); Las Vegas Gladiators (2006)

Awards and highlights
- First-team All-Big Ten (1991); 2× Second-team All-Big Ten (1989, 1990)

Career NFL statistics
- Games played: 123
- Tackles: 207
- Sacks: 43
- Interceptions: 1
- Stats at Pro Football Reference

Alonzo Robert Spellman (born September 27, 1971) is an American former professional football player who was a defensive end in the National Football League (NFL) for the Chicago Bears, Dallas Cowboys, and Detroit Lions. He also was a member of the Las Vegas Gladiators in the Arena Football League (AFL). He played college football at Ohio State University.

== Early life ==
Spellman attended Rancocas Valley Regional High School in Mount Holly, New Jersey. As a senior linebacker, he stood 6 feet 4 inches (1.93 m) tall and weighed approximately 250 pounds (110 kg). He tallied 104 tackles and 14 sacks, receiving USA Today All-American honors, All-state and New Jersey Player of the Year honors.

As a senior in basketball, he averaged 17 points and 22 rebounds per game.

== College career ==
Spellman accepted a football scholarship from Ohio State University. As a true freshman, he was named a starter at outside linebacker, registering 10 tackles for loss (led the team), 4 sacks (tied for the team lead). Some observers in the media considered that this was his best position and best season in college.

As a sophomore, he was moved to defensive end, posting 52 tackles (9 tackles for loss) and 2 sacks. He was suspended for the Liberty Bowl and placed on academic probation, after he was caught sending another person to take a classroom test for him.

As a junior, he earned team MVP honors after making 9 tackles for loss, 3 sacks, 3 passes defensed and one forced fumble in 9 games. He declared for the NFL draft after the season.

== Professional career ==
=== Chicago Bears ===
Spellman was selected by the Chicago Bears in the first round (22nd overall) of the 1992 NFL draft, entering the league as a 20-year-old rookie. He was a backup behind future hall of famer Richard Dent at right defensive end, making 30 tackles, 4 sacks (fourth on the team) and one pass defensed. In 1993, he tallied 28 tackles, and 2.5 sacks.

In 1994, new head coach Dave Wannstedt chose not to re-sign Dent and Spellman became the starter at right defensive end. He recorded 60 tackles, 7 sacks (second on the team), 8 passes defensed (third on the team) and one blocked kick.

In 1995, he was moved from right to left defensive end during training camp. He collected 66 tackles, 8.5 sacks (second on the team), 5 passes defensed and 4 forced fumbles.

In 1996, he posted 78 tackles, 8 sacks (led the team), 2 passes defensed and 3 forced fumbles. He became a restricted free agent after the season, when his rookie contract expired. The Jacksonville Jaguars offered him a four-year $12 million contract that was matched by the Bears.

In 1997, he injured his left shoulder in the fourth game against the New England Patriots, forcing him miss the next 5 contests. He also experienced some off-field incidents and was suspended for 3 games. He finished with 5 starts in 7 games, 15 tackles, 2 sacks and 2 passes defensed. On November 26, he was re-instated to play against the Detroit Lions. On June 12, 1998, he was waived after he refused to leave his publicist's house for eight hours during a standoff with the police, until being arrested. The next day, he left Good Shepherd Hospital, shirtless and shoeless in freezing weather.

=== Dallas Cowboys ===
On July 28, 1999, after being out of football for a year, the Dallas Cowboys took a gamble and signed him as a free agent after he was diagnosed and received treatment for bipolar disorder. He was moved from defensive end to defensive tackle during training camp, and went on to register 16 starts, 43 tackles (tied for tenth on the team), 2 tackles for loss, 22 quarterback pressures (led the team) and 5 sacks (tied for second on the team).

In 2000, he started 15 games, finishing with 33 tackles (3 for loss), 7 quarterback pressures, 2 passes defensed and 5 sacks (second on the team). During his time with the Cowboys he was a solid player, but never regained the previous form he showed with the Chicago Bears.

=== Detroit Lions ===
On August 12, 2001, he signed as a free agent with the Detroit Lions. He was cut to make room for wide receiver Bert Emanuel on October 24.

=== Las Vegas Gladiators (AFL) ===
On October 18, 2005, he was signed by the Las Vegas Gladiators of the Arena Football League, after being out of football for 4 years. He played middle guard in the defense.

== NFL career statistics ==
Year	Team	GP	Comb	Solo	Asst	Sacks	FF	FR
1992	CHI	15	0	0	0	4.0	0	0
1993	CHI	16	19	14	5	2.5	1	0
1994	CHI	16	39	27	12	7.0	1	0
1995	CHI	16	49	32	17	8.5	4	1
1996	CHI	16	45	37	8	8.0	2	0
1997	CHI	7	12	8	4	2.0	0	0
1999	DAL	16	16	13	3	5.0	0	1
2000	DAL	16	24	18	6	5.0	1	0
2001	DET	5	3	3	0	1.0	0	0
Career		123	207	152	55	43.0	9	2

== Struggles with bipolar disorder ==
Spellman exhibited erratic behavior during his time with the Bears. The first public incident occurred in March 1998 when Spellman became enraged when a doctor was late for an appointment. He pulled a telephone off of a wall and threatened suicide. Complicating matters, Spellman had access to alcohol and a firearm and by this time weighed approximately 300 lbs (136 kg). Authorities were called in, and friend and former teammate Mike Singletary persuaded Spellman to check into a hospital. Spellman shortly left the hospital of his own accord.

Spellman was diagnosed with bipolar disorder, but refused to take medication, instead becoming increasingly reliant on illicit drugs and alcohol. This led to even more erratic behavior and run-ins with the law. These problems, along with his refusal to undergo arthroscopic surgery on his injured shoulder led to Spellman's release by the Bears.

Spellman started taking medication and successfully managed his disorder during his time with the Cowboys and Lions. However, after his NFL career ended, Spellman stopped taking his medication and again ran into problems with the law. Most notably, he had a manic episode on July 23, 2002, in which he disrupted a flight from Cincinnati to Philadelphia. Spellman initially suggested that the flight was going to crash, then became verbally abusive to other passengers and threatened members of the flight crew. The plane was forced to make an emergency landing. Spellman was released, but then damaged property at his brother's home and was taken to a psychiatric hospital. He was later arrested on charges of interference with a flight crew. Although doctors confirmed that he had bipolar disorder, Spellman was determined to be legally sane and spent 18 months in federal prison.

In interviews with ESPN, Spellman has said he now knows how important it is to take the medication for his disorder. He had hoped to return to the NFL, but his age and history presented significant barriers to a comeback. He is now "100 percent into" mixed martial arts.

Spellman was arrested again on January 29, 2008, leading authorities on a pursuit after being involved in an apparent altercation at a Tulsa, Oklahoma convenience store. The chase ended after three of the tires on Spellman's car were deflated by spike strips and pepper-spray pellets were fired after Spellman refused to get out of the vehicle. In June 2012, Spellman was released from prison after pleading no contest to ten counts of eluding police officers on the 2008 charge.

Spellman was arrested again on November 2, 2015, after a motor vehicle stop for several outstanding warrants. After being taken into custody he was found in possession of marijuana. He was charged with possession of less than 50 grams of marijuana and turned over to another jurisdiction for the warrant.

== Personal life ==
Spellman made his mixed martial arts debut on November 11, 2006, defeating Antoine Hayes by unanimous decision. The fight was part of XFO 13, "Operation Beatdown", and took place at the Sears Centre in Hoffman Estates, Illinois.

== See also ==
- List of Arena Football League and National Football League players
