= Leigh Jaynes =

American freestyle wrestler

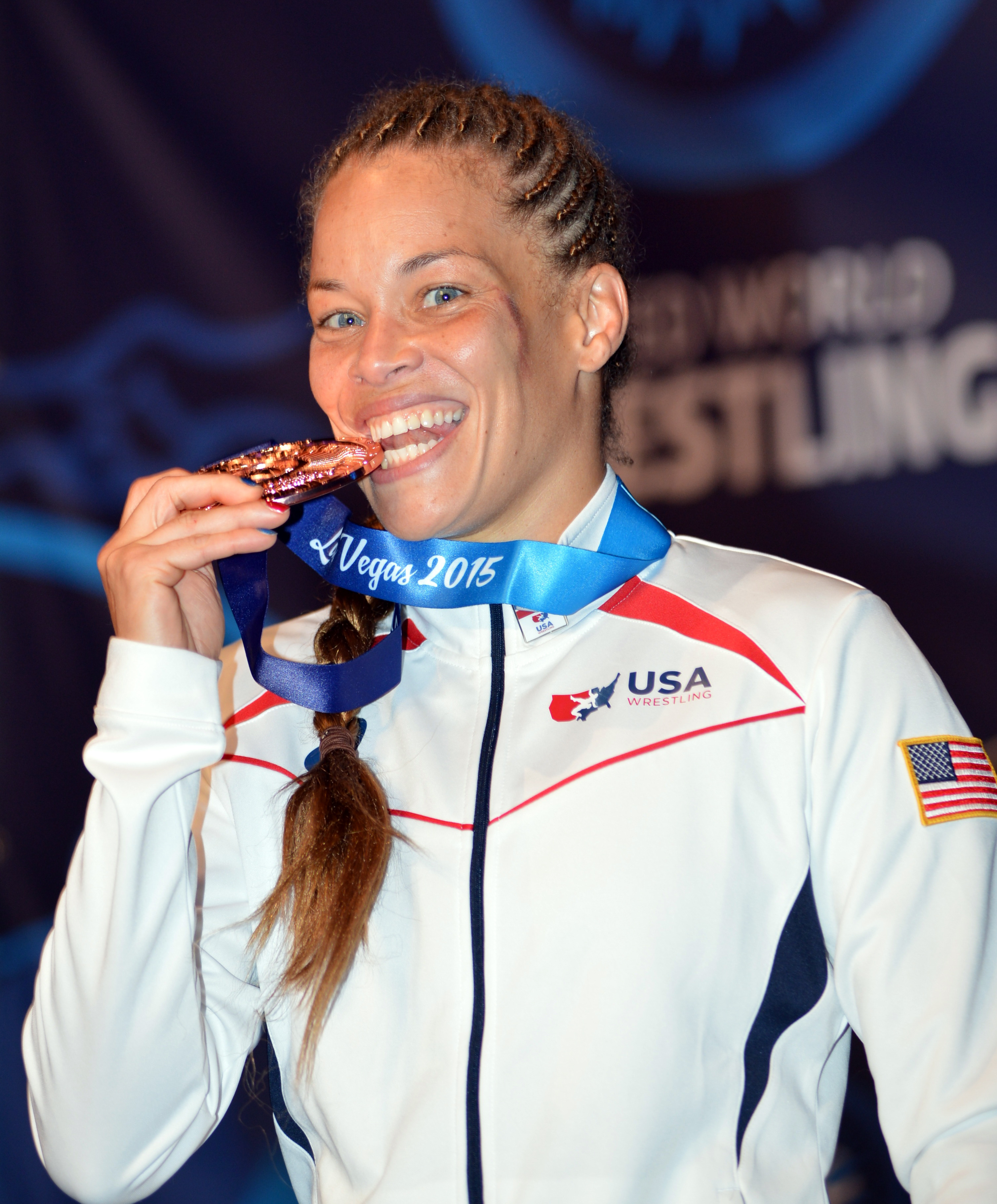
- Leigh Jaynes-Provisor in 2015

Medal record

Women's freestyle wrestling

Representing United States

World Championships
Bronze medal – third place	2006 Beach Worlds	70 kg
Bronze medal – third place	2015 Las Vegas	60 kg

Leigh Evelyn Jaynes (born December 18, 1980) is an American freestyle wrestler and beach wrestler.

== Education and military service ==
Jaynes earned a Bachelor of Science in Exercise Science (Health and Fitness) and a Master of Arts in Management from Missouri Valley College. During the spring of her sophomore year, after facing academic challenges, she enlisted in the U.S. Army Reserve on February 22, 2002, with the goal of establishing a solid financial foundation and building personal discipline.

She began her military career as a combat medic and later earned a commission as a Medical Service Corps officer through Wentworth Military Academy. Jaynes was rated first at the accessions board and served as Cadet Commander throughout the program, demonstrating outstanding leadership and commitment.

== Athletic career ==
Jaynes was a multi-sport athlete growing up, with a strong interest in instrumental music. She participated in dance, swimming, track and field, and cheerleading before discovering wrestling in her senior year at Rancocas Valley Regional High School in Mount Holly, New Jersey. She was encouraged to try out by Coach Brian Bowker. His support and that of his wife, Eileen Bowker, was instrumental in Jaynes’s journey.

Jaynes quickly made her mark in wrestling, becoming a 1999 High School All-American at the USGWA Girl's Folk-Style National Championship. She went on to become a two-time All-American while wrestling for Missouri Valley College. After placing fifth at University Nationals, she qualified as a resident athlete at the U.S. Olympic Training Center in Colorado Springs, where she trained among the nation’s elite as part of the Olympic Development Program.

In addition to her athletic pursuits, Jaynes was actively involved in music. She participated in every band throughout her schooling, serving as drum major and playing both flute and tuba. She was also a six-chair tuba player for the All-South Jersey Wind Ensemble, performing in the iconic 1812 Overture.

Between 2005 and 2016, Jaynes was named to six non-consecutive U.S. national wrestling teams and competed at the 2009, 2012, and 2015 World Wrestling Championships. Representing the U.S. Army in the World Class Athlete Program (WCAP), she became the first military woman in nearly a decade to medal at the World Wrestling Championships. Her photo is displayed at the WCAP facility at Fort Carson, Colorado. In 2015, she won a bronze medal in the women’s freestyle 60 kg division at the World Championships, becoming the first military woman to medal in that weight class. She also earned a bronze medal at the 2015 Pan-American Wrestling Championship and the 2008 World Beach Wrestling Championships.

Jaynes won gold at prestigious international tournaments including the Sunkist International, Dave Schultz Memorial, Henry Delgange Tournament, Alexander Medved, and Bill Farrell International. She was also selected as a wrestler for the Beat the Streets fundraiser, competing on the Intrepid in New York and helping raise $900,000 for inner-city youth.

She credited her success to the intense discipline and consistency of Army training under the leadership of Coach Shon Lewis, to Team USA's elite development and support under Head Coach Terry Steiner, and to the advocacy of Coach Bobby Douglas, who ensured she retained her Olympic Training Center resident status and continued training through pregnancy. The Olympic Training Center environment, combined with her involvement in the Wrestling Mindset program, was pivotal in her journey. Jaynes achieved her 2015 World medal after returning to elite competition post-pregnancy, becoming one of the first American women to return to high-level sport after childbirth. She has since become a strong advocate for athlete mothers, promoting support for women balancing athletic careers and family life.

== After athletic career ==
Leigh Jaynes officially retired from competitive wrestling following the 2016 U.S. Olympic Trials and completed her out-processing from the U.S. Army Reserve on June 16, 2016. Transitioning into coaching, Jaynes became the Head Women's Wrestling Coach at Delaware Valley University, serving from 2019 to 2022. During her tenure, she celebrated her first major coaching victory with a win over NCAA Division I program Sacred Heart University.

In 2022, Jaynes accepted an assistant coaching position at Grand Canyon University in Phoenix, Arizona. She also played a pivotal role in the early development and support of the women’s wrestling program at Johnson & Wales University in Providence, Rhode Island.

Jaynes has volunteered her time and expertise to support the growth of wrestling and youth development initiatives in Cabo Verde.

== Personal life ==
Jaynes was born on December 18, 1980, in Mount Holly, New Jersey. She was raised in a working-class household.

Jaynes pursued higher education at Missouri Valley College, earning a Bachelor of Science in Exercise Science and a Master of Arts in Management. She also completed ROTC training. Leigh served in the Army from 2002 to 2016, reaching the rank of Captain and participating in the World Class Athlete Program.

She was previously married to Olympic Greco-Roman wrestler Ben Provisor, with whom she had a daughter named Evelyn.
