= Robert L. Ord III =

United States Army general (born 1940)

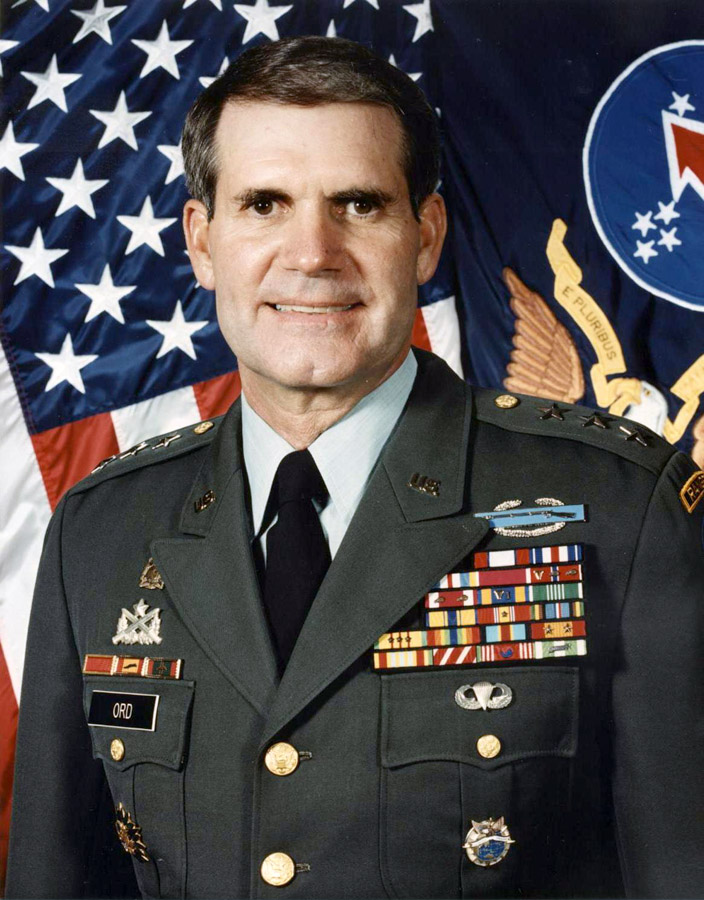
- Born: May 2, 1940 (age 86); Philadelphia, Pennsylvania, U.S.
- Military career
- Allegiance: United States
- Branch: United States Army
- Service years: 1962–1996
- Rank: Lieutenant General
- Commands: United States Army Pacific; 25th Infantry Division
- Conflicts: Vietnam War
- Awards: Army Distinguished Service Medal (2); Silver Star; Defense Superior Service Medal; Legion of Merit (3); Bronze Star Medal (3)

Robert Laird Ord III (born May 12, 1940) is a retired lieutenant general of the United States Army who served as commander of United States Army Pacific from 1993 until 1996.

== Early life and education ==
Born in Philadelphia and raised in New Jersey, Ord graduated from Rancocas Valley Regional High School in 1958. He is an alumnus of the United States Military Academy with a B.S. degree in 1962 and the Georgia Institute of Technology with an M.S. degree in industrial management in 1972. He also received military education at the United States Army War College.

== Military career ==
During the Vietnam War, Ord commanded an Infantry company of the 25th Division in 1966. He then worked as a Personnel Staff Officer for the headquarters of the United States Army Vietnam. Later in the conflict, from 1972 to 1973, he worked as a Senior Adviser for the 41st Ranger Command and as Chief of Plans and Operations for Region IV.

Ord's major commands were the US Total Army Personnel Command in Alexandria, Virginia, from 1990 to 1992, and the 25th Infantry Division prior to taking command of United States Army Pacific (USARPAC). Other significant duties were Chief of Staff for the Combined Field Army in Korea from 1987 to 1989. He also served as Assistant Division Commander for the 7th Infantry Division in Fort Ord, California. He retired in June 1996.

Ord's awards include the Army Distinguished Service Medal, the Silver Star, the Defense Superior Service Medal, the Legion of Merit, and the Bronze Star Medal. In 2002, he was named Dean of the Naval Postgraduate School of International Graduate Studies (SIGS).

In August 2018, President Donald Trump appointed Ord to the American Battle Monuments Commission. He was sworn in on October 16, 2018.
