= Zhang Qi (wrestler) =

Chinese freestyle wrestler

Personal information
- Native name: 张骐
- Born: 11 September 1998 (age 28)

Sport
- Country: China
- Sport: Amateur wrestling
- Weight class: 59 kg
- Event: Freestyle
- Club: Shanxi Provincial team
Medal record
Women's freestyle wrestling
Representing China
World Championships
Gold medal – first place	2023 Belgrade	59 kg
Asian Games
Bronze medal – third place	2026 Aichi–Nagoya	62 kg
Asian Championships
Gold medal – first place	2024 Bishkek	59 kg
Bronze medal – third place	2019 Xi'an	59 kg
Bronze medal – third place	2017 New Delhi	55 kg
Bronze medal – third place	2025 Amman	65 kg
Bronze medal – third place	2026 Bishkek	62 kg
Golden Grand Prix Ivan Yarygin
Gold medal – first place	2018 Krasnoyarsk	57 kg
World U23 Championships
Silver medal – second place	2017 Bydgoszcz	53 kg
World Junior Championships
Silver medal – second place	2018 Trnava	57 kg

Zhang Qi (born 11 September 1998) is a Chinese freestyle wrestler. She won a gold medal in the 59 kg event at the 2023 World Wrestling Championships held in Belgrade, Serbia.

== Background ==
Zhang is from Baishan in Jilin province.

In September 2023, Zhang won a gold medal in the 59 kg event at the 2023 World Wrestling Championships by defeating Yuliya Tkach.
