= Dzhanan Manolova =

Bulgarian freestyle wrestler

Personal information
- Born: 16 May 1993 (age 33) Mainz, Germany

Sport
- Country: Bulgaria
- Sport: Amateur wrestling
- Event: Freestyle
Medal record
Women's freestyle wrestling
Representing Bulgaria
World Championships
Bronze medal – third place	2015 Las Vegas	60 kg
European Championships
Bronze medal – third place	2012 Belgrade	67 kg
Bronze medal – third place	2014 Vantaa	63 kg

Dzhanan Manolova (born 16 May 1993) is a Bulgarian freestyle wrestler. She won a bronze medal at the 2015 World Wrestling Championships held in Las Vegas, United States. She is also a two-time bronze medalist at the European Wrestling Championships.

== Achievements ==
Year	Tournament	Location	Result	Event
2015	World Championships	Las Vegas, United States	3rd	Freestyle 60 kg
