= Sakura Onishi =

Japanese freestyle wrestler

Personal information
- Native name: 尾西 桜
- Born: 23 March 2006 (age 20) Fukuoka Prefecture, Japan
- Height: 1.65 m (5 ft 5 in)
- Weight: 59 kg (130 lb; 9.3 st)

Sport
- Country: Japan
- Sport: Wrestling
- Weight class: 59 kg
- Event: Freestyle
Medal record
Women's freestyle wrestling
Representing Japan
World Championships
Gold medal – first place	2025 Zagreb	59 kg
Asian Championships
Gold medal – first place	2025 Amman	59 kg
Grand Prix
Gold medal – first place	2025 Tirana	59 kg
World U20 Championships
Gold medal – first place	2024 Pontevedra	59 kg
Gold medal – first place	2025 Samokov	59 kg
Gold medal – first place	2026 Bratislava	59 kg
World U17 Championships
Gold medal – first place	2023 İstanbul	53 kg
Silver medal – second place	2022 Rome	53 kg
Japan National Championships
Gold medal – first place	2024 Tokyo	59 kg

Sakura Onishi (Jap. 尾西 桜 Onishi Sakura; born 23 March 2006) is a Japanese freestyle wrestler competing in the 59 kg division. She won the gold medal at the 2025 Asian Wrestling Championships.

== Career ==
In the 2025 Asian Wrestling Championships held in Amman, Jordan, after passing the first round bye, she reached the final by defeating Indian Muskan Nandal 12–2 in the quarterfinals and Mongolian Togtokhyn Altjin 10–0 with technical superiorities in the semifinals. In the final match, she defeated North Korean Hong Pyol 6-4 and won the gold medal.
