= Nonoka Ozaki =

Japanese freestyle wrestler

- Ozaki at the 2021 World Wrestling Championships

Personal information
- Nationality: Japanese
- Born: 23 March 2003 (age 23) Tokyo, Japan
- Education: Keio University
- Height: 164 cm (5 ft 5 in)
- Weight: 68 kg (150 lb)

Sport
- Country: Japan
- Sport: Amateur wrestling
- Weight class: 62 kg; 65 kg; 68 kg
- Event: Freestyle
Medal record
Women's freestyle wrestling
Representing Japan
Olympic Games
Bronze medal – third place	2024 Paris	68 kg
World Championships
Gold medal – first place	2022 Belgrade	62 kg
Gold medal – first place	2023 Belgrade	65 kg
Silver medal – second place	2026 Astana	62 kg
Bronze medal – third place	2021 Oslo	62 kg
Asian Championships
Gold medal – first place	2022 Ulaanbaatar	62 kg
Gold medal – first place	2024 Bishkek	68 kg
Gold medal – first place	2026 Bishkek	62 kg
Bronze medal – third place	2023 Astana	62 kg
Bronze medal – third place	2025 Amman	62 kg
Asian Games
Gold medal – first place	2026 Aichi–Nagoya	62 kg
Silver medal – second place	2022 Hangzhou	62 kg
Grand Prix
Gold medal – first place	2026 Zagreb	62 kg
World U23 Championships
Gold medal – first place	2022 Pontevedra	62 kg
World Juniors Championships
Gold medal – first place	2022 Sofia	62 kg
Summer Youth Olympics
Gold medal – first place	2018 Buenos Aires	57 kg

Nonoka Ozaki (born 23 March 2003) is a Japanese freestyle wrestler. She is a bronze medalist at the 2024 Summer Olympic Games. She is a two-time gold medalist at the World Wrestling Championships and a three-time gold medalist at the Asian Wrestling Championships.

== Career ==
Ozaki won the gold medal in the girls' freestyle 57 kg event at the 2018 Summer Youth Olympics held in Buenos Aires, Argentina. She defeated Anna Szél of Hungary in her gold medal match.

Ozaki won one of the bronze medals in the women's 62 kg event at the 2021 World Wrestling Championships in Oslo, Norway. She defeated Ilona Prokopevniuk of Ukraine in her bronze medal match.

Ozaki won the gold medal in her event at the 2022 Asian Wrestling Championships held in Ulaanbaatar, Mongolia. She also won the gold medal in her event at the 2022 World Junior Wrestling Championships held in Sofia, Bulgaria. In the same year, Ozaki won the gold medal in the 62 kg event at the World Wrestling Championships held in Belgrade, Serbia. She also won the gold medal in the 62 kg event at the 2022 U23 World Wrestling Championships held in Pontevedra, Spain.

Ozaki won the silver medal in the women's 62 kg event at the 2022 Asian Games held in Hangzhou, China. In the final, she lost against Mun Hyon-gyong of North Korea.

She won the gold medal in the 65 kg event at the 2023 World Wrestling Championships held in Belgrade, Serbia. As a result, Ozaki earned a quota place for Japan for the 2024 Summer Olympics in Paris, France. She defeated Macey Kilty of the United States in her gold medal match.

In 2024, she won the gold medal in the women's 68 kg event at the Asian Wrestling Championships held in Bishkek, Kyrgyzstan. She won one of the bronze medals in the women's 68 kg event at the 2024 Summer Olympics. She defeated Blessing Oborududu of Nigeria in her bronze medal match.

== Achievements ==
Year	Tournament	Location	Result	Event
2021	World Championships	Oslo, Norway	3rd	Freestyle 62 kg
2022	Asian Championships	Ulaanbaatar, Mongolia	1st	Freestyle 62 kg
2022	World Championships	Belgrade, Serbia	1st	Freestyle 62 kg
2023	Asian Championships	Astana, Kazakhstan	3rd	Freestyle 62 kg
2023	World Championships	Belgrade, Serbia	1st	Freestyle 65 kg
2023	Asian Games	Hangzhou, China	2nd	Freestyle 62 kg
2024	Asian Championships	Bishkek, Kyrgyzstan	1st	Freestyle 68 kg
2024	Summer Olympics	Paris, France	3rd	Freestyle 68 kg
2025	Asian Championships	Amman, Jordan	3rd	Freestyle 62 kg
2026	Asian Championships	Bishkek, Kyrgyzstan	1st	Freestyle 62 kg
2026	Asian Games	Aichi and Nagoya, Japan	1st	Freestyle 62 kg

== Filmography ==
=== Web shows ===
Year	Title	Role	Notes	Ref.
2025	Physical: Asia	Contestant	Netflix	
