= Laurence Beauregard =

Canadian freestyle wrestler

Personal information
- Born: August 4, 1997 (age 29) Montreal, Quebec

Sport
- Country: Canada
- Sport: Amateur wrestling
- Weight class: 59 kg
- Event: Freestyle
Medal record
Women's freestyle wrestling
Representing Canada
World Championships
Bronze medal – third place	2025 Zagreb	59 kg
Pan American Wrestling Championships
Gold medal – first place	2019 Buenos Aires	59 kg
Gold medal – first place	2022 Acapulco	59 kg
Gold medal – first place	2024 Acapulco	59 kg
Gold medal – first place	2025 Monterrey	59 kg
Silver medal – second place	2018 Lima	59 kg
Silver medal – second place	2026 Coralville	59 kg
Bronze medal – third place	2017 Lauro de Freitas	60 kg
Representing Quebec
Jeux de la Francophonie
Gold medal – first place	2017 Abidjan	55 kg

Laurence Beauregard is a Canadian freestyle wrestler. She is a seven-time medalist, including four gold medals, at the Pan American Wrestling Championships. She won a bronze medal at the 2025 World Championships in Zagreb after taking 5th in 2024.

== Career ==
At the 2019 Pan American Wrestling Championships held in Buenos Aires, Argentina she won the gold medal in the women's 59 kg event. A year earlier, she won the silver medal in this event.

Beauregard won the gold medal in her event at the 2022 Pan American Wrestling Championships held in Acapulco, Mexico. She competed in the 59 kg event at the 2022 World Wrestling Championships held in Belgrade, Serbia.

Beauregard won the gold medal in her event at the 2024 Pan American Wrestling Championships held in Acapulco, Mexico.

== Achievements ==
Year	Tournament	Location	Result	Event
2017	Pan American Wrestling Championships	Lauro de Freitas, Brazil	3rd	Freestyle 60 kg
2018	Pan American Wrestling Championships	Lima, Peru	2nd	Freestyle 59 kg
2019	Pan American Wrestling Championships	Buenos Aires, Argentina	1st	Freestyle 59 kg
2022	Pan American Wrestling Championships	Acapulco, Mexico	1st	Freestyle 59 kg
2024	Pan American Wrestling Championships	Acapulco, Mexico	1st	Freestyle 59 kg
2025	Pan American Wrestling Championships	Monterrey, Mexico	1st	Freestyle 59 kg
2026	Pan American Wrestling Championships	Coralville, United States	2nd	Freestyle 59 kg
