= Sükheegiin Tserenchimed =

Mongolian wrestler

Personal information
- Native name: Сүхээгийн Цэрэнчимэд
- Nationality: Mongolia
- Born: 24 February 1995 (age 31) Khentii, Mongolia
- Height: 164 cm (5 ft 5 in)

Sport
- Country: Mongolia
- Sport: Wrestling
- Weight class: 62 kg
- Event: Freestyle
- Coached by: Tserenbaataryn Khosbayar Tserenbaataryn Tsogtbayar

Achievements and titles
- World finals: (gold) (2014) (silver) (2015) (2024)
- Regional finals: (bronze) (2011, 2014, 2019)
Medal record
Women's freestyle wrestling
Representing Mongolia
World Championships
Gold medal – first place	2014 Tashkent	60 kg
Silver medal – second place	2024 Tirana	59 kg
Silver medal – second place	2015 Las Vegas	60 kg
World Cup
Bronze medal – third place	2022 Coralville	Team
Asian Games
Bronze medal – third place	2014 Incheon	63 kg
Asian Championships
Bronze medal – third place	2011 Tashkent	59 kg
Bronze medal – third place	2014 Astana	60 kg
Bronze medal – third place	2019 Xi'an	57 kg
Bronze medal – third place	2024 Bishkek	62 kg
Bronze medal – third place	2026 Bishkek	62 kg
World U23 Championships
Bronze medal – third place	2018 Bucharest	57 kg
Military World Games
Silver medal – second place	2019 Wuhan	57 kg
World Military Championships
Gold medal – first place	2014 New Jersey	60 kg
Gold medal – first place	2023 Baku	62 kg
Bronze medal – third place	2018 Moscow	62 kg
Golden Grand Prix Ivan Yarygin
Gold medal – first place	2024 Krasnoyarsk	62 kg
Gold medal – first place	2022 Krasnoyarsk	62 kg
Gold medal – first place	2019 Krasnoyarsk	57 kg
Silver medal – second place	2014 Krasnoyarsk	58 kg
Bronze medal – third place	2016 Krasnoyarsk	58 kg
Yasar Dogu Tournament
Gold medal – first place	2022 Istanbul	62 kg
Kaba Uulu Kozhomkul & Raatbek Sanatbaev Tournament
Bronze medal – third place	2023 Bishkek	62 kg
World Junior Championships
Gold medal – first place	2013 Sofie	59 kg
World Cadet Championships
Gold medal – first place	2010 Baku	60 kg

Sükheegiin Tserenchimed (Mongolian: Сүхээгийн Цэрэнчимэд) is a Mongolian freestyle wrestler. She holds a gold medal in the 60 kg bracket at the 2014 World Wrestling Championships and a silver medal in the same bracket in the 2015 World Wrestling Championships.

== Videos ==
- World Championship 2014 - Final
