= Deepak Punia (wrestler) =

Indian freestyle wrestler (born 1999)

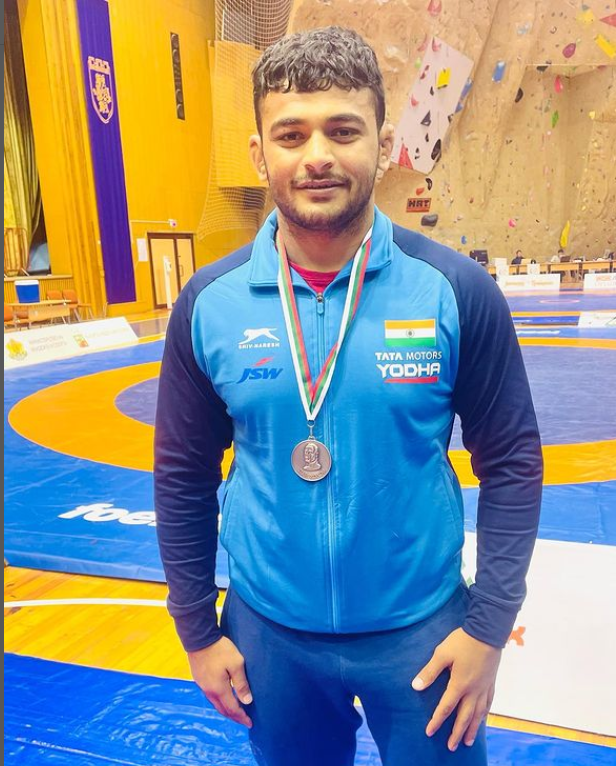
- Punia at the 2022 Yasar Dogu Tournament

Personal information
- Born: 19 May 1999 (age 27) Chhara, Haryana, India
- Military career
- Branch: Indian Army
- Rank: Subedar
- Unit: Rajputana Rifles

Sport
- Sport: Wrestling
- Event: Freestyle
Medal record
Men's freestyle wrestling
Representing India
World Championships
Silver medal – second place	2019 Nur-Sultan	86 kg
Asian Games
Silver medal – second place	2022 Hangzhou	86 kg
Bronze medal – third place	2026 Aichi–Nagoya	97 kg
Asian Championships
Silver medal – second place	2021 Almaty	86 kg
Silver medal – second place	2022 Ulaanbaatar	86 kg
Silver medal – second place	2025 Amman	92 kg
Bronze medal – third place	2019 Xi'an	86 kg
Bronze medal – third place	2020 New Delhi	86 kg
Asian Indoor Games
Bronze medal – third place	2017 Ashgabat	86 kg
Commonwealth Games
Gold medal – first place	2022 Birmingham	86 kg
Grand Prix
Silver medal – second place	2025 Ulaanbaatar	92 kg
Bronze medal – third place	2022 Istanbul	92 kg
Bronze medal – third place	2025 Kocaeli	92 kg
World Junior Championships
Gold medal – first place	2019 Tallinn	86 kg
Silver medal – second place	2018 Trnava	86 kg
Asian Junior Championships
Gold medal – first place	2018 New Delhi	86 kg
World Cadet Championships
Gold medal – first place	2016 Tbilisi	85 kg

Deepak Punia (born 19 May 1999) is an Indian freestyle wrestler. Punia has won a silver medal at the 2019 World Championships in the men's 86 kg event, where he conceded the final by walkover to his idol, Hassan Yazdani. This silver medal earned him a berth at the 2020 Tokyo Olympics, where he finished fifth after narrowly losing the bronze medal match. He later won gold in same event at the 2022 Commonwealth Games and silver at the 2022 Asian Games.

== Senior career results ==
Res.	Record	Opponent	Score	Date	Event	Location
Tied 11th at 86 kg
Loss	50-32	Evsem Shvelidze (GEO)	3-4	10 January 2024	2024 Grand Prix Zagreb Open	(Croatia) Zagreb
Win	50-31	Valentyn Babii (UKR)	4-1	10 January 2024	2024 Grand Prix Zagreb Open	(Croatia) Zagreb
Loss	49-31	Azamat Dauletbekov (KAZ)	2-6	10 January 2024	2024 Grand Prix Zagreb Open	(Croatia) Zagreb
(silver) Silver Medal at 86 kg
Loss	49-30	Hassan Yazdani (IRI)	0-14	7 October 2023	2022 Asian Games	(China) Hangzhou
Win	49-29	Javrail Shapiev (UZB)	7-4	7 October 2023	2022 Asian Games	(China) Hangzhou
Win	48-29	Shota Shirai (JPN)	10-4	7 October 2023	2022 Asian Games	(China) Hangzhou
Win	47-29	Randa Riendesta (INA)	15-0	7 October 2023	2022 Asian Games	(China) Hangzhou
Win	46-29	Magomed Sharipov (BHR)	6-3	7 October 2023	2022 Asian Games	(China) Hangzhou
7th at 92 kg
Loss	45-29	Tariel Gaphrindashvili (GEO)	0-8	9 - 14 April 2023	2023 Kaba Uulu Kozhomkul & Raatbek Sanatbaev Tournament	Bishkek, Kyrgyzstan
Win	44-29	Islyambek Ilyassov (KAZ)	11-2	9 - 14 April 2023	2023 Kaba Uulu Kozhomkul & Raatbek Sanatbaev Tournament	Bishkek, Kyrgyzstan
7th at 92 kg
Loss	43-29	Magomed Sharipov (BHR)	0-8	9 - 14 April 2023	2023 Asian Wrestling Championships	Almaty, Kazakhstan
Win	43-28	Sun Xiao (CHN)	11-2	9 - 14 April 2023	2023 Asian Wrestling Championships	Almaty, Kazakhstan
(gold) Gold Medal at 86kg
Win	42-28	Muhammad Inam (PAK)	6-0	5 August 2022	2022 Commonwealth Games	(United Kingdom) Birmingham
Win	41-28	Alex Moore (CAN)	6-2	5 August 2022	2022 Commonwealth Games	(United Kingdom) Birmingham
Win	40-28	Sheku Kassegbama (SLE)	14-0	5 August 2022	2022 Commonwealth Games	(United Kingdom) Birmingham
Win	39-28	Matthew Oxenham (NZL)	14-0	5 August 2022	2022 Commonwealth Games	(United Kingdom) Birmingham
6th at 92 kg
Loss	38-28	Abdimanap Baigenzheyev (KAZ)	0-5	2 - 5 June 2022	2022 Bolat Turlykhanov Cup	Almaty, Kazakhstan
Loss	38-27	Adilet Davlumbayev (KAZ)	0-5	2 - 5 June 2022	2022 Bolat Turlykhanov Cup	Almaty, Kazakhstan
(silver) Silver Medal at 86kg
Loss	38-26	Azamat Dauletbekov (KAZ)	2-9	19 - 24 April 2022	2022 Asian Wrestling Championships	(Mongolia) Ulaanbaatar
Win	38-25	Kim Gwan-uk (KOR)	8-0	19 - 24 April 2022	2022 Asian Wrestling Championships	(Mongolia) Ulaanbaatar
Win	37-25	Mohsen Mostafavi (IRI)	9-0	19 - 24 April 2022	2022 Asian Wrestling Championships	(Mongolia) Ulaanbaatar
(bronze) Bronze Medal at 92 kg
Win	36-25	Elkhan Asadov (KAZ)	10-2	27 February 2022	2022 Yasar Dogu Tournament	(Turkey) Istanbul
Win	35-25	Mirlan Chynybekov (KGZ)	13-2	27 February 2022	2022 Yasar Dogu Tournament	(Turkey) Istanbul
Loss	34-25	Ahmad Bazrighaleh (IRI)	0-5	27 February 2022	2022 Yasar Dogu Tournament	(Turkey) Istanbul
Win	33-24	Shamil Zubairov (AZE)	7-3	27 February 2022	2022 Yasar Dogu Tournament	(Turkey) Istanbul
(bronze) Bronze Medal at 92 kg
Win	32-24	Parveen Rana (IND)	14-0	20 February 2022	2022 Memorial of Dan Kolov & Nikola Petroff	Veliko Tarnovo, Bulgaria
Loss	31-24	Adlan Tasuyeu (BLR)	2-6	20 February 2022	2022 Memorial of Dan Kolov & Nikola Petroff	Veliko Tarnovo, Bulgaria
Win	30-23	Beka Tcheldize (GEO)	15-2	20 February 2022	2022 Memorial of Dan Kolov & Nikola Petroff	Veliko Tarnovo, Bulgaria
Win	29-23	Irakli Mtsituri (GEO)	11-2	20 February 2022	2022 Memorial of Dan Kolov & Nikola Petroff	Veliko Tarnovo, Bulgaria
Tied 5th at 86kg
Loss	28-23	Myles Amine (SMR)	3-7	5 August 2021	2020 Summer Olympics	(Japan) Tokyo
Loss	28-22	David Taylor (USA)	0-14	5 August 2021	2020 Summer Olympics	(Japan) Tokyo
Win	28-21	Lin Zushen (CHN)	9-4	5 August 2021	2020 Summer Olympics	(Japan) Tokyo
Win	27-21	Ekerekeme Agiomor (NGR)	16-2	5 August 2021	2020 Summer Olympics	(Japan) Tokyo
9th at 86 kg
Loss	26-21	Sebastian Jezierzanski (POL)	0-5	11 June 2021	2021 Poland Open	(Poland) Warsaw
Loss	26-20	Zahid Valencia (USA)	0-5	11 June 2021	2021 Poland Open	(Poland) Warsaw
(silver) Silver Medal at 86kg
Loss	26-19	Hassan Yazdani (IRI)	0-14	18 April 2021	2021 Asian Wrestling Championships	Almaty, Kazakhstan
Win	26-18	Kim Gwan-uk (KOR)	0-5	18 April 2021	2021 Asian Wrestling Championships	Almaty, Kazakhstan
Win	25-18	Bakhodur Kadirov (TJK)	7-4	18 April 2021	2021 Asian Wrestling Championships	Almaty, Kazakhstan
Win	24-18	Isa Shapiev (UZB)	12-3	18 April 2021	2021 Asian Wrestling Championships	Almaty, Kazakhstan
Tied 5th at 86kg
Loss	23-18	Piotr Ianulov (MDA)	2-7	18 December 2020	2020 Wrestling World Cup	Belgrade, Serbia
Loss	23-17	Dauren Kurugliev (RUS)	0-7	18 December 2020	2020 Wrestling World Cup	Belgrade, Serbia
Win	23-16	Uri Kalashnikov (ISR)	11-0	18 December 2020	2020 Wrestling World Cup	Belgrade, Serbia
Win	23-15	Ivars Samusonoks (LAT)	17-8	18 December 2020	2020 Wrestling World Cup	Belgrade, Serbia
(bronze) Bronze Medal at 86kg
Win	22-15	Issa Al Obaidi (IRQ)	14-0	23 February 2020	2020 Asian Wrestling Championships	(India) New Delhi
Loss	21-15	Shutaro Yamada (JPN)	2-7	23 February 2020	2020 Asian Wrestling Championships	(India) New Delhi
Win	21-14	Gankhuyag Ganbaatar (MGL)	11-4	23 February 2020	2020 Asian Wrestling Championships	(India) New Delhi
12th at 86 kg
Loss	20-14	Ethan Ramos (PUR)	2-15	January 2020	2020 Matteo Pellicone Ranking Series	Italy
(silver) Silver Medal at 86kg
Loss	20-13	Hassan Yazdani (IRI)	0-5	22 September 2019	2019 World Wrestling Championships	Nur-Sultan, Kazakhstan
Win	20-12	Stefan Reichmuth (CHE)	11-4	22 September 2019	2019 World Wrestling Championships	Nur-Sultan, Kazakhstan
Win	19-12	Carlos Izquierdo (COL)	10-7	22 September 2019	2019 World Wrestling Championships	Nur-Sultan, Kazakhstan
Win	18-12	Bakhodur Kadirov (TJK)	9-0	22 September 2019	2019 World Wrestling Championships	Nur-Sultan, Kazakhstan
Win	17-12	Adilet Davlumbayev (KAZ)	11-7	22 September 2019	2019 World Wrestling Championships	Nur-Sultan, Kazakhstan
(silver) Silver Medal at 86 kg
Loss	16-12	Aleksandr Qostiyev (AZE)	3-10	14 July 2019	2019 Yasar Dogu Memorial Tournament	(Turkey) Istanbul
Win	16-11	Osman Göçen (TUR)	10-5	14 July 2019	2019 Yasar Dogu Memorial Tournament	(Turkey) Istanbul
Win	15-11	James Patrick Downey III (USA)	14-6	14 July 2019	2019 Yasar Dogu Memorial Tournament	(Turkey) Istanbul
(bronze) Bronze Medal at 86 kg
Win	14-11	Boris Makoev (SVK)	6-3	May 2019	2019 Matteo Pellicone Memorial	Sassari, Italy
Win	13-11	Christian Hipsher (USA)	14-0	May 2019	2019 Matteo Pellicone Memorial	Sassari, Italy
Loss	12-11	Azamat Dauletbekov (KAZ)	0-5	May 2019	2019 Matteo Pellicone Memorial	Sassari, Italy
Win	12-10	Saifedine Alekma (FRA)	11-0	May 2019	2019 Matteo Pellicone Memorial	Sassari, Italy
(bronze) Bronze Medal at 86 kg
Win	11-10	Bakhodur Kadirov (TJK)	11-3	28 April 2019	2019 Asian Wrestling Championships	Xi'an, China
Loss	10-10	Kamran Ghasempour (IRI)	0-14	28 April 2019	2019 Asian Wrestling Championships	Xi'an, China
Win	10-9	Lin Zushen (CHN)	6-4	28 April 2019	2019 Asian Wrestling Championships	Xi'an, China
Win	9-9	Saifedine Alekma (FRA)	14-8	28 April 2019	2019 Asian Wrestling Championships	Xi'an, China
13th at 86 kg
Loss	8-9	Ruslan Abdulaev (RUS)	4-11	February 2019	2019 Memorial of Dan Kolov & Nikola Petroff	Ruse, Bulgaria
Win	8-8	Meruzhan Nikoyan (ARG)	14-0	February 2019	2019 Memorial of Dan Kolov & Nikola Petroff	Ruse, Bulgaria
(bronze) Bronze Medal at 86 kg
Win	7-8	Osman Göçen (TUR)	8-4	July 2018	2018 Tbilisi Memorial Grand Prix of V. Balavadze & G. Kartozia	(Hungary) Tbilisi
Win	6-8	Umidjon Ismanov (UZB)	6-2	July 2018	2018 Tbilisi Memorial Grand Prix of V. Balavadze & G. Kartozia	(Hungary) Tbilisi
Loss	5-8	Saba Chikhradze (GEO)	5-9	July 2018	2018 Tbilisi Memorial Grand Prix of V. Balavadze & G. Kartozia	(Hungary) Tbilisi
Win	5-7	Georgii Rubaev (MDA)	5-0	July 2018	2018 Tbilisi Memorial Grand Prix of V. Balavadze & G. Kartozia	(Hungary) Tbilisi
Tied 16th at 92 kg
Loss	4-7	Liubomyr Sagaliuk (UKR)	0-4	21 October 2018	2018 World Wrestling Championships	(Hungary) Budapest
8th at 92 kg (rep. team India)
Loss	4-6	Hayden Zillmer (USA)	0-10	April 2018	2018 Wrestling World Cup	(United States) Iowa City, USA
Loss	4-5	Dato Marsagishvili (GEO)	0-14	April 2018	2018 Wrestling World Cup	(United States) Iowa City, USA
Win	4-4	Takashi Ishiguro (JPN)	5-2	April 2018	2018 Wrestling World Cup	(United States) Iowa City, USA
Loss	3-4	Ilishkhan Chilayev (KAZ)	4-13	April 2018	2018 Wrestling World Cup	(United States) Iowa City, USA
5th at 86kg
Loss	3-3	Bi Shengfeng (CHN)	0-10	4 March 2018	2018 Asian Wrestling Championships	Bishkek, Kyrgyzstan
Win	3-2	Shota Shirai (JPN)	7-2	4 March 2018	2018 Asian Wrestling Championships	Bishkek, Kyrgyzstan
Loss	2-2	Orgodolyn Üitümen (MGL)	0-7	4 March 2018	2018 Asian Wrestling Championships	Bishkek, Kyrgyzstan
Win		Wisam Shakir (IRQ)	Walkover	4 March 2018	2018 Asian Wrestling Championships	Bishkek, Kyrgyzstan
5th at 86 kg
Loss	2-1	Umidjon Ismanov (UZB)	6-8	9 October 2016	2016 Pune Mayor's Cup	(India) Pune
Win	2-0	Sandro Aminashvili (GEO)	7-2	9 October 2016	2016 Pune Mayor's Cup	(India) Pune
Win	1-0	Tumurbat Mungun (MGL)	2-1	9 October 2016	2016 Pune Mayor's Cup	(India) Pune
