= Wrestling at the 2022 Asian Games – Men's freestyle 86 kg =

Men's freestyle 86 kg at the 2022 Asian Games
- Venue: Lin'an Sports and Culture Centre
- Date: 7 October 2023
- Competitors: 17 from 17 nations

Medalists
gold medal	Hassan Yazdani	Iran
silver medal	Deepak Punia	India
bronze medal	Javrail Shapiev	Uzbekistan
bronze medal	Döwletmyrat Orazgylyjow	Turkmenistan

The men's 86 kilograms freestyle wrestling competition at the 2022 Asian Games was held on 7 October 2023 at the Lin'an Sports and Culture Centre in Hangzhou. The event was competed by 17 competitors from 17 nations. Hassan Yazdani of Iran won the gold medal after defeating Deepak Punia of India in the final. Javrail Shapiev of Uzbekistan and Döwletmyrat Orazgylyjow of Turkmenistan won the bronze medals.

== Background ==
Men's freestyle wrestling was first contested at the 1954 Asian Games in Manila. It has been contested at every edition of the Asian Games since then.

Iran's Hassan Yazdani was the defending champion, having won the gold medal in the same event at the 2018 Asian Games in Jakarta. Lebanon's Domenic Abounader won the silver medal, while Kazakhstan's Adilet Davlumbayev and Mongolia's Orgodolyn Üitümen won the bronze medals. Of the medalists from the previous Asian Games, only Yazdani returned to compete in the 2022 Asian Games.

Yazdani had won the gold medal in the 74 kg category at the 2016 Summer Olympics and the silver medal in the 86 kg category at the 2020 Summer Olympics. He had also won a silver medal at the 2022 and the 2023 World Wrestling Championships. Kazakhstan's Azamat Dauletbekov is a bronze medalist from the 2022 World Wrestling Championships and a two time Asian champion, having won the gold medal at the 2022 and 2023 Asian Wrestling Championships in the 86 kg category.

India's Deepak Punia had won a silver medal at the 2021 and 2022 Asian Wrestling Championships, and a gold medal at the 2022 Commonwealth Games. Other competitors include Bahrain's Magomed Sharipov, who won a bronze medal at the 2023 Asian Wrestling Championships, and Uzbekistan's Javrail Shapiev, who lost in the semifinals of the 2023 World Wrestling Championships to Yazdani.

== Format ==
The freestyle wrestling competition was competed as a single-elimination tournament. The two finalists competed against each other for the gold and silver medals. Each wrestler who loses to one of the two finalists moves into the repechage rounds, which is used to determine the bronze medals. The losers of the semifinals compete against the remaining repechage opponent from their half of the bracket in the bronze medal bout.

== Schedule ==
The men's freestyle 86 kg event was held on 7 October 2023 held at the Lin'an Sports and Culture Centre in Hangzhou. All times are China Standard Time (UTC+08:00)

Date	Time	Event
Saturday, 7 October 2023	10:00	Qualifications
Saturday, 7 October 2023	10:00	1/8 finals
Saturday, 7 October 2023	10:00	1/4 finals
Saturday, 7 October 2023	10:00	Semifinals
Saturday, 7 October 2023	10:00	Repechages
Saturday, 7 October 2023	17:00	Finals

== Summary ==
Punia won 3–2 against Sharipov in the qualification round and won by technical superiority against Indonesia's Randa Riandesta in the next round. In the quarterfinals, he defeated Japan's Shota Shirai 7–3, scoring by two takedowns, one step-out, and two caution points. In the semifinals against Shapiev, Punia trailed 2-3, however, he scored two points after a successful challenge in the final minute to win the bout. Yazdani defeated Kyrgyzstan's Mukhammad Abdullaev in the opening round, Turkmenistan's Döwletmyrat Orazgylyjow in the quarterfinals, and Mongolia's Byambasürengiin Bat-Erdene in the semifinals, all by technical superiority without conceding a single point to his opponents.

In the final, Yazdani defeated Punia 10–0 by technical superiority to successfully defend his Asian Games title. Despite competing in the tournament with his right shoulder heavily taped following an injury during the World Championships, Yazdani ended the bout in 2 minutes and 29 seconds to win the gold medal while Punia settled for the silver medal.

Shapiev and Döwletmyrat Orazgylyjow of Turkmenistan won the bronze medals. Shapiev defeated Sharipov 3–0 in his bronze-medal bout while Orazgylyjow defeated Mongolia's Byambasürengiin Bat-Erdene 12–4 to win the other bronze medal.

== Results ==
Legend

- F — Won by fall

=== Main bracket ===
==== Final ====
Gold medal match
Deepak Punia (IND)	0
Hassan Yazdani (IRI)	10

==== Top Half ====
Qualifications
Deepak Punia (IND)	3
Magomed Sharipov (BRN)	2

1/8 finals
Shota Shirai (JPN)	10
Farhad Malikzada (AFG)	0
Deepak Punia (IND)	11
Randa Riandesta (INA)	0
Azamat Dauletbekov (KAZ)	6
Kim Gwan-uk (KOR)	0
Haider Ali Butt (PAK)	0
Javrail Shapiev (UZB)	11

1/4 finals
Shota Shirai (JPN)	3
Deepak Punia (IND)	7
Azamat Dauletbekov (KAZ)	3
Javrail Shapiev (UZB)	4

Semifinals
Deepak Punia (IND)	4
Javrail Shapiev (UZB)	3

==== Bottom Half ====
Qualifications

1/8 finals
Yanaal Baraze (SYR)	4
Sun Xiao (CHN)	9
Byambasürengiin Bat-Erdene (MGL)	10
Heng Vuthy (CAM)	0
Hassan Yazdani (IRI)	10
Mukhammad Abdullaev (KGZ)	0
Gary Chow (SGP)	0
Döwletmyrat Orazgylyjow (TKM)	11

1/4 finals
Sun Xiao (CHN)	0
Byambasürengiin Bat-Erdene (MGL)	10
Hassan Yazdani (IRI)	10
Döwletmyrat Orazgylyjow (TKM)	0

Semifinals
Byambasürengiin Bat-Erdene (MGL)	0
Hassan Yazdani (IRI)	10

=== Repechage ===
Repechage round 1
Magomed Sharipov (BRN)	10
Randa Riandesta (INA)	0

Repechage round 2
Magomed Sharipov (BRN)	6
Shota Shirai (JPN)	0
Mukhammad Abdullaev (KGZ)	3
Döwletmyrat Orazgylyjow (TKM)	9

Bronze medal matches
Magomed Sharipov (BRN)	0
Javrail Shapiev (UZB)	3
Döwletmyrat Orazgylyjow (TKM)	12
Byambasürengiin Bat-Erdene (MGL)	4

== Final standing ==
Rank	Athlete
1st place, gold medalist(s)	Hassan Yazdani (IRI)
2nd place, silver medalist(s)	Deepak Punia (IND)
3rd place, bronze medalist(s)	Javrail Shapiev (UZB)
3rd place, bronze medalist(s)	Döwletmyrat Orazgylyjow (TKM)
5	Magomed Sharipov (BRN)
5	Byambasürengiin Bat-Erdene (MGL)
7	Shota Shirai (JPN)
8	Azamat Dauletbekov (KAZ)
9	Sun Xiao (CHN)
10	Yanaal Baraze (SYR)
11	Mukhammad Abdullaev (KGZ)
12	Kim Gwan-uk (KOR)
13	Farhad Malikzada (AFG)
14	Heng Vuthy (CAM)
15	Haider Ali Butt (PAK)
16	Gary Chow (SGP)
17	Randa Riandesta (INA)
