= Hassan Yazdani =

Iranian wrestler born 1994

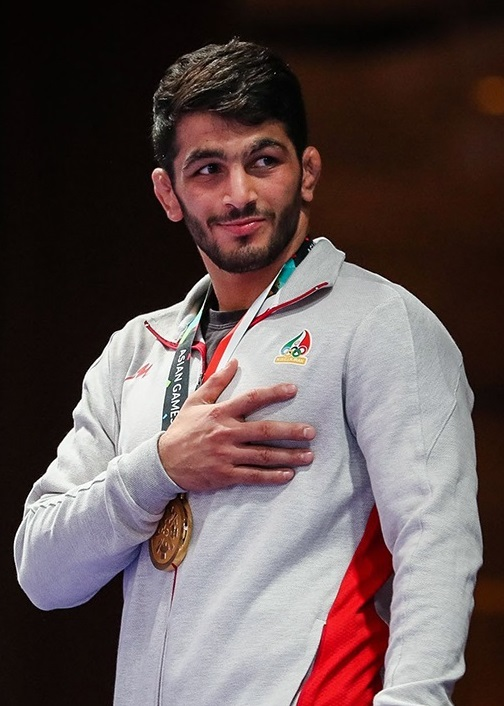
- Yazdani at the 2018 Asian Games

Personal information
- Native name: حسن یزدانی چَراتی
- Full name: Hassan Yazdani Charati
- Nicknames: The Greatest; The Lion King
- Born: December 26, 1994 (age 31) Juybar, Mazandaran, Iran
- Height: 1.82 m (6 ft 0 in)
- Weight: 97 kg (214 lb)

Sport
- Country: Iran
- Sport: Freestyle wrestling
- Turned pro: 2014
- Coached by: Hemmat Moslemi; Mahmoud Esmaeilpour; Mohammad Talaei; Rasoul Khadem; Gholamreza Mohammadi; Pejman Dorostkar
Medal record
Men's freestyle wrestling
Representing Iran
Event	1st	2nd	3rd
Olympic Games	1	2	0
World Championships	3	3	2
Asian Games	2	0	0
Asian Championships	2	0	0
World Cup	3	0	0
World Junior Championships	1	0	0
Asian Junior Championships	1	0	0
World Cadet Championships	0	1	0
Asian Cadet Championships	0	0	1
Other	7	3	0
Total	20	9	3
Olympic Games
Gold medal – first place	2016 Rio de Janeiro	74 kg
Silver medal – second place	2020 Tokyo	86 kg
Silver medal – second place	2024 Paris	86 kg
World Championships
Gold medal – first place	2017 Paris	86 kg
Gold medal – first place	2019 Nur-Sultan	86 kg
Gold medal – first place	2021 Oslo	86 kg
Silver medal – second place	2015 Las Vegas	70 kg
Silver medal – second place	2022 Belgrade	86 kg
Silver medal – second place	2023 Belgrade	86 kg
Bronze medal – third place	2018 Budapest	86 kg
Bronze medal – third place	2026 Astana	97 kg
Asian Championships
Gold medal – first place	2018 Bishkek	86 kg
Gold medal – first place	2021 Almaty	86 kg
Asian Games
Gold medal – first place	2018 Jakarta	86 kg
Gold medal – first place	2022 Hangzhou	86 kg
Islamic Solidarity Games
Gold medal – first place	2017 Baku	86 kg
World Cup
Gold medal – first place	2015 Los Angeles	70 kg
Gold medal – first place	2016 Los Angeles	74 kg
Gold medal – first place	2017 Kermanshah	86 kg
Grand Prix
Gold medal – first place	2015 Kermanshah	70 kg
Gold medal – first place	2015 Paris	70 kg
Gold medal – first place	2022 Almaty	86 kg
Gold medal – first place	2023 Zagreb	86 kg
Gold medal – first place	2019 Russe	86 kg
Gold medal – first place	2024 Budapest	86 kg
Silver medal – second place	2016 Minsk	74 kg
Silver medal – second place	2016 Paris	74 kg
Silver medal – second place	2026 Zagreb	97 kg

Hassan Yazdani Charati (Persian: حسن یزدانی چراتی; born 26 December 1994) is an Iranian freestyle wrestler. Yazdani is an Olympic and world champion in freestyle wrestling in two weight categories.

He became Olympic champion in the 74kg category at the 2016 Summer Olympics after defeating Russian wrestler Aniuar Geduev in the final. The following year, he became world champion at the 2017 World Wrestling Championships in the Men's freestyle 86 kg category. He won his second world title at the 2019 World Wrestling Championships in Kazakhstan and third at the 2021 World Wrestling Championships in Norway. Yazdani has been the sportsman of the year and the best wrestler of Iran several times.

== Career ==
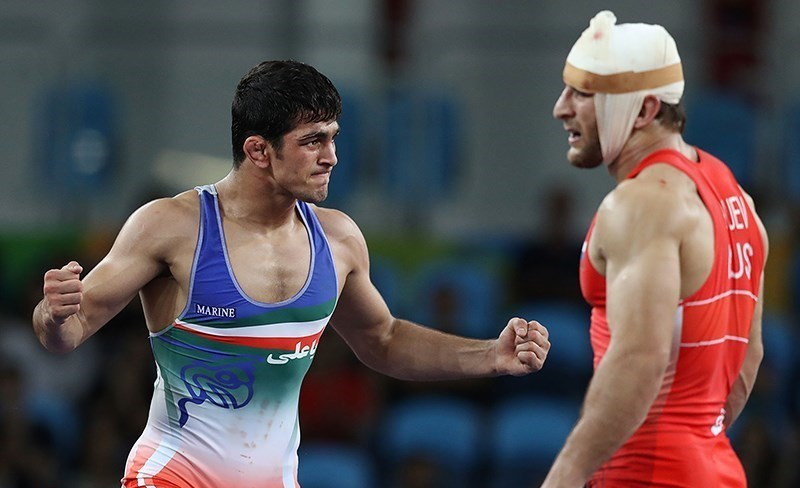
Yazdani celebrates after defeating Aniuar Geduev of Russia during the Men's 74kg Gold Medal Wrestling match of the Rio 2016 Summer Olympics.

Yazdani earned a gold medal at the 2014 Junior World Championships in the 66 kg division, by defeating his American opponent Aaron Pico in the final. The following year, he placed second at the Senior World Championships, losing to Magomedrasul Gazimagomedov of Russia in the finals by a score of 10–3.

After bumping up to 74 kg. Yazdani claimed gold at the 2016 Rio Olympics, defeating Aniuar Geduev 6–6 with criteria by scoring the final points.

After once again bumping up in weight, Yazdani won gold at the 2017 Islamic Solidarity Games in the 86 kg division. He defeated former Olympic gold medalist Sharif Sharifov of Azerbaijan with a score of 11-0 and 2016 Olympic silver medalist Selim Yaşar of Turkey with the same score en route to becoming champion.

In July 2017, Yazdani won the Iran Freestyle Wrestling Nationals at 86 kg, defeating Alireza Karimi 5–0 on his path to victory. This gained him a place at the 2017 World Wrestling Championships in Paris. In 2017 World Wrestling Championships in Paris, Hassan Yazdani participated in 86 kg. He became the champion with decisive wins, 4 out of 5 matches including the final with technical superiority. In the entire championship, Yazdani gave out only two points. Right after the matches, he stated that he "came to Paris for a decisive gold, with no ifs or buts".

He lost to American David Taylor in the men's 86 kg final at the 2020 Summer Olympics. He then scored his first win against Taylor in the final of the men's 86 kg event at the 2021 World Wrestling Championships.

Yazdani won the final by walkover at the 2019 World Wrestling Championships in the freestyle 86 kg category, against India's Deepak Punia, a wrestler that "idolises Yazdani". Yazdani faced Punia next in the wrestling competition at the 2022 Asian Games – in the Men's freestyle 86 kg final, where Yazdani beat Punia 10–0 in a one-sided match.

Yazdani won the silver medal in the men's 86 kg event at the 2022 World Wrestling Championships held in Belgrade, Serbia. He lost to his rival David Taylor in the final.

He again won the silver medal in the men's 86 kg event at the 2023 World Wrestling Championships held in Belgrade, Serbia. He lost to his arch-rival David Taylor for the fifth time, now trailing 1–5 in their head-to-head. He won the gold medal in the men's 86 kg event at the 2022 Asian Games held in Hangzhou, China.

He won the silver medal in the men's freestyle 86 kg event at the 2024 Summer Olympics in Paris, France.

== Personal life ==
On 29 December 2025, Yazdani publicly supported the 2025–2026 Iranian protests, stating: "Wrestling has taught me that falling down is not a bad thing. But staying under pressure and not speaking out is difficult."

== Achievements ==
- Olympic Games – (gold) 2016, (silver) 2020, 2024
- World Championships – (gold) 2017, 2019, 2021 (silver) 2015, 2022, 2023 (bronze) 2018, 2026
- World Cup – (gold) 2015, 2016, 2017
- World Junior Championship – (gold) 2014
- Asian Junior Championship – (gold) 2014
- World Cadet Championship – (silver) 2011
- Asian Cadet Championship – (bronze) 2011
- Asian Games – (gold) 2018, 2022
- Asian Championships – (gold) 2018, 2021
- Islamic Solidarity Games – (gold) 2017
- Takhti Cup – (gold) 2015
- Dan Kolov Tournament – (gold) 2019
- Paris Tournament – (gold) 2015, (silver) 2016
- Aleksandr Medved Prizes – (silver) 2016

== Senior career results ==
Res.	Record	Opponent	Score	Date	Event	Location
2nd Place (with Esteghlal Jouybar) 97 kg
Win	133-9	Mojtaba Goleij (IRI)	4-0	12 December 2025	2025 Iranian Premier League	(Iran) Tehran
Win	132-9	Abolfazl Babaloo (IRI)	10-0	12 December 2025	2025 Iranian Premier League	(Iran) Tehran
(silver) Silver Medal at 86 kg
Loss	131-9	Magomed Ramazanov (BUL)	1-7	9 August 2024	2024 Summer Olympics	(France) Paris
Win	131-8	Myles Amine (SMR)	7-1	8 August 2024	2024 Summer Olympics	(France) Paris
Win	130-8	Dauren Kurugliev (GRE)	9-4	8 August 2024	2024 Summer Olympics	(France) Paris
Win	129-8	Jayden Lawrence (AUS)	10-0	8 August 2024	2024 Summer Olympics	(France) Paris
(gold) Gold Medal at 86 kg
Win	128-8	Trent Hidlay (USA)	12-2	8 June 2024	2024 Polyák Imre & Varga János Memorial Tournament	(Hungary) Budapest
Win	127-8	Azamat Dauletbekov (KAZ)	10-0	8 June 2024	2024 Polyák Imre & Varga János Memorial Tournament	(Hungary) Budapest
Win	126-8	Hayato Ishiguro (JPN)	12-2	8 June 2024	2024 Polyák Imre & Varga János Memorial Tournament	(Hungary) Budapest
Win	125-8	Ethan Ramos (PUR)	13-2	8 June 2024	2024 Polyák Imre & Varga János Memorial Tournament	(Hungary) Budapest
(gold) Gold Medal at 86 kg
Win	124-8	Deepak Punia (IND)	10-0	7 October 2023	2022 Asian Games	(China) Hangzhou
Win	123-8	Byambasürengiin Bat-Erdene (MGL)	10-0	7 October 2023	2022 Asian Games	(China) Hangzhou
Win	122-8	Döwletmyrat Orazgylyjow (TKM)	10-0	7 October 2023	2022 Asian Games	(China) Hangzhou
Win	121-8	Mukhammad Abdullaev (KGZ)	10-0	7 October 2023	2022 Asian Games	(China) Hangzhou
(silver) Silver Medal at 86 kg
Loss	120-8	David Taylor (USA)	3-9, Fall	17 September 2023	2023 World Championships	Belgrade, Serbia
Win	120-7	Javrail Shapiev (UZB)	10-0	16 September 2023	2023 World Championships	Belgrade, Serbia
Win	119-7	Myles Amine (SMR)	7-2	16 September 2023	2023 World Championships	Belgrade, Serbia
Win	118-7	Byambasürengiin Bat-Erdene (MGL)	11-0	16 September 2023	2023 World Championships	Belgrade, Serbia
Win	117-7	Jayden Lawrence (AUS)	8-2, Fall	16 September 2023	2023 World Championships	Belgrade, Serbia
(gold) Gold Medal at 86 kg
Win	116-7	Hayato Ishiguro (JPN)	13-2	1 February 2023	2023 Grand Prix Zagreb Open	(Croatia) Zagreb
Win	115-7	Mark Hall (USA)	10-0	1 February 2023	2023 Grand Prix Zagreb Open	(Croatia) Zagreb
Win	114-7	Abubakr Abakarov (AZE)	11-0	1 February 2023	2023 Grand Prix Zagreb Open	(Croatia) Zagreb
Win	113-7	Sebastian Jezierzanski (POL)	10-0	1 February 2023	2023 Grand Prix Zagreb Open	(Croatia) Zagreb
(silver) Silver Medal at 86 kg
Loss	112-7	David Taylor (USA)	1-7	16 September 2022	2022 World Championships	Belgrade, Serbia
Win	112-6	Boris Makoev (SVK)	10-0	15 September 2022	2022 World Championships	Belgrade, Serbia
Win	111-6	Sebastian Jezierzanski (POL)	11-0	15 September 2022	2022 World Championships	Belgrade, Serbia
Win	110-6	Ivan Ichizli (MDA)	10-0	15 September 2022	2022 World Championships	Belgrade, Serbia
(gold) Gold Medal at 86 kg
Win	109-6	Boris Makoev (SVK)	11-0	5 June 2022	2022 Bolat Turlykhanov Cup	(Kazakhstan) Almaty
Win	108-6	Azamat Dauletbekov (KAZ)	12-1	5 June 2022	2022 Bolat Turlykhanov Cup	(Kazakhstan) Almaty
Win	107-6	Fatih Erdin (TUR)	12-0	5 June 2022	2022 Bolat Turlykhanov Cup	(Kazakhstan) Almaty
(gold) Gold Medal at 86 kg
Win	106–6	David Taylor (USA)	6–2	3 October 2021	2021 World Championships	(Norway) Oslo
Win	105–6	Artur Naifonov (RWF)	8–2	2 October 2021	2021 World Championships	(Norway) Oslo
Win	104–6	Ethan Ramos (PUR)	10–0	2 October 2021	2021 World Championships	(Norway) Oslo
Win	103–6	Azamat Dauletbekov (KAZ)	12–2	2 October 2021	2021 World Championships	(Norway) Oslo
(silver) Silver Medal at 86 kg
Loss	102–6	David Taylor (USA)	3–4	5 August 2021	2020 Summer Olympics	(Japan) Tokyo
Win	102–5	Artur Naifonov (ROC)	7–1	4 August 2021	2020 Summer Olympics	(Japan) Tokyo
Win	101–5	Stefan Reichmuth (SUI)	12–1	4 August 2021	2020 Summer Olympics	(Japan) Tokyo
Win	100–5	Javrail Shapiev (UZB)	11–2	4 August 2021	2020 Summer Olympics	(Japan) Tokyo
(gold) Gold Medal at 86 kg
Win	99–5	Deepak Punia (IND)	10–0	18 April 2021	2021 Asian Championships	(Kazakhstan) Almaty
Win	98–5	Mustafa Abdul-Basit (IRQ)	10–0	18 April 2021	2021 Asian Championships	(Kazakhstan) Almaty
Win	97–5	Hayato Ishiguro (JPN)	10–0	18 April 2021	2021 Asian Championships	(Kazakhstan) Almaty
Winners at 86 kg
Win	96–5	Kamran Ghasempour (IRI)	5–2	9 March 2021	2020 Iran Olympic Trials	(Iran) Tehran
1st Place (with Iran-Mall Club) at 86 kg
Win	95–5	Sajjad Gholami (IRI)	11–1	17 December 2020	2020 Iranian Premier League	(Iran) Tehran
Win	94–5	Morteza Mirzaei (IRI)	10–0	17 December 2020	2020 Iranian Premier League	(Iran) Tehran
Win	93–5	Arash Nayyerabadi (IRI)	11–0	10 December 2020	2020 Iranian Premier League	(Iran) Tehran
Win	92–5	Alireza Karimi (IRI)	10–0	9 December 2020	2020 Iranian Premier League	(Iran) Tehran
Win	91–5	Alireza Karimi (IRI)	13–0	6 October 2020	2020 Iranian Premier League	(Iran) Tehran
Winners at 86 kg
Win	90–5	Ahmad Bazrighaleh (IRI)	11–0	5 November 2020	2020 Iran World Team Trials	(Iran) Tehran
4th Place (with #Ta Sabt Jahani Tous Club) at 86 kg
Win	89–5	Reza Bayat (IRI)	10–0	22 November 2019	2019 Iranian Premier League	(Iran) Tehran
Win	88–5	Ali Mojerloo (IRI)	11–1	22 November 2019	2019 Iranian Premier League	(Iran) Tehran
Win	87–5	Hossein Shahbazi (IRI) (92 kg)	10–0	8 November 2019	2019 Iranian Premier League	(Iran) Mashhad
Win	86–5	Mersad Marghzari (IRI)	10–0	7 November 2019	2019 Iranian Premier League	(Iran) Mashhad
(gold) Gold Medal at 86 kg
Win		Deepak Punia (IND)	Walkover	22 September 2019	2019 World Championships	(Kazakhstan) Nur-Sultan
Win	85–5	Myles Amine (SMR)	11–0	21 September 2019	2019 World Championships	(Kazakhstan) Nur-Sultan
Win	84–5	Artur Naifonov (RUS)	4–2, Fall	21 September 2019	2019 World Championships	(Kazakhstan) Nur-Sultan
Win	83–5	István Veréb (HUN)	9–2, Fall	21 September 2019	2019 World Championships	(Kazakhstan) Nur-Sultan
Win	82–5	Jaime Espinal (PUR)	10–0	21 September 2019	2019 World Championships	(Kazakhstan) Nur-Sultan
Winners at 86 kg
Win	81–5	Kamran Ghasempour (IRI)	6–3	28 June 2019	2019 Iran World Team Trials	(Iran) Tehran
(gold) Gold Medal at 86 kg
Win	80–5	Ali Shabanau (BLR)	16–5	3 March 2019	2019 Dan Kolov & Nikola Petrov Tournament	(Bulgaria) Ruse
Win	79–5	Boris Makoev (SVK)	11–1	2 March 2019	2019 Dan Kolov & Nikola Petrov Tournament	(Bulgaria) Ruse
Win	78–5	Ruslan Abdulaev (RUS)	11–0	2 March 2019	2019 Dan Kolov & Nikola Petrov Tournament	(Bulgaria) Ruse
Win	77–5	Azamat Dauletbekov (KAZ)	10–0	2 March 2019	2019 Dan Kolov & Nikola Petrov Tournament	(Bulgaria) Ruse
Win	76–5	Akhmed Magamaev (BUL)	10–0	2 March 2019	2019 Dan Kolov & Nikola Petrov Tournament	(Bulgaria) Ruse
Win	75–5	Domenic Abounader (LBN)	11–0	2 March 2019	2019 Dan Kolov & Nikola Petrov Tournament	(Bulgaria) Ruse
(bronze) Bronze Medal at 86 kg
Win	74–5	Dauren Kurugliev (RUS)	11–5	21 October 2018	2018 World Championships	(Hungary) Budapest
Win	73–5	Yurieski Torreblanca (CUB)	10–0	21 October 2018	2018 World Championships	(Hungary) Budapest
Win	72–5	Hajy Rajabau (BLR)	10–0	21 October 2018	2018 World Championships	(Hungary) Budapest
Loss	71–5	David Taylor (USA)	6–11	20 October 2018	2018 World Championships	(Hungary) Budapest
(gold) Gold Medal at 86 kg
Win	71–4	Domenic Abounader (LBN)	10–0	19 August 2018	2018 Asian Games	(Indonesia) Jakarta
Win	70–4	Orgodolyn Üitümen (MGL)	12–2	19 August 2018	2018 Asian Games	(Indonesia) Jakarta
Win	69–4	Pawan Kumar (IND)	11–0	19 August 2018	2018 Asian Games	(Indonesia) Jakarta
Win	68–4	Fahriansyah (INA)	10–0	19 August 2018	2018 Asian Games	(Indonesia) Jakarta
Winners at 86 kg
Win	67–4	Kamran Ghasempour (IRI)	8–2	10 May 2018	2018 Iran World Team Trials	(Iran) Tehran
Win	66–4	Hamed Ashegh Hoseini (IRI)	13–0	10 May 2018	2018 Iran World Team Trials	(Iran) Tehran
Win	65–4	Ahmad Bazrighaleh (IRI)	8–0	10 May 2018	2018 Iran World Team Trials	(Iran) Tehran
(gold) Gold Medal at 86 kg
Win	64–4	Orgodolyn Üitümen (MGL)	10–0	4 March 2018	2018 Asian Championships	(Kyrgyzstan) Bishkek
Win	63–4	Javrail Shapiev (UZB)	13–0	4 March 2018	2018 Asian Championships	(Kyrgyzstan) Bishkek
Win	62–4	Azamat Dauletbekov (KAZ)	12–2	4 March 2018	2018 Asian Championships	(Kyrgyzstan) Bishkek
(gold) Gold Medal at 86 kg
Win	61–4	Boris Makoev (SVK)	10–0	25 August 2017	2017 World Championships	(France) Paris
Win	60–4	Vladislav Valiev (RUS)	4–0	25 August 2017	2017 World Championships	(France) Paris
Win	59–4	Aleksandr Qostiyev (AZE)	10–0	25 August 2017	2017 World Championships	(France) Paris
Win	58–4	Piotr Ianulov (MDA)	10–0	25 August 2017	2017 World Championships	(France) Paris
Win	57–4	Azamat Dauletbekov (KAZ)	12–2	25 August 2017	2017 World Championships	(France) Paris
Winners at 86 kg
Win	56–4	Ezzatollah Akbari (IRI)	12–2	7 July 2017	2017 Iran World Team Trials	(Iran) Tehran
Win		Mohammad Javad Ebrahimi (IRI)	Walkover	7 July 2017	2017 Iran World Team Trials	(Iran) Tehran
Win	55–4	Alireza Karimi (IRI)	5–0	7 July 2017	2017 Iran World Team Trials	(Iran) Tehran
Win	54–4	Ezzatollah Akbari (IRI)	11–0	7 July 2017	2017 Iran World Team Trials	(Iran) Tehran
Win	53–4	Esmaeil Mahmoudi (IRI)	10–0	7 July 2017	2017 Iran World Team Trials	(Iran) Tehran
Win	52–4	Hanif Bagherzadeh (IRI)	10–0	7 July 2017	2017 Iran World Team Trials	(Iran) Tehran
(gold) Gold Medal at 86 kg
Win	51–4	Selim Yaşar (TUR)	11–0	20 May 2017	2017 Islamic Solidarity Games	(Azerbaijan) Baku
Win	50–4	Sharif Sharifov (AZE)	11–0	20 May 2017	2017 Islamic Solidarity Games	(Azerbaijan) Baku
Win	49–4	Bakhodur Kadirov (TJK)	10–0	20 May 2017	2017 Islamic Solidarity Games	(Azerbaijan) Baku
(gold) Gold Medal (with Iran) at 86 kg
Loss	48–4	David Taylor (USA)	4–8, Fall	17 February 2017	2017 World Cup	(Iran) Kermanshah
Win	48–3	Pürevjavyn Önörbat (MGL)	11–2	17 February 2017	2017 World Cup	(Iran) Kermanshah
Win	47–3	Serdar Böke (TUR)	11–1	16 February 2017	2017 World Cup	(Iran) Kermanshah
(gold) Gold Medal at 74 kg
Win	46–3	Aniuar Geduev (RUS)	6–6	19 August 2016	2016 Summer Olympics	(Brazil) Rio de Janeiro
Win	45–3	Galymzhan Usserbayev (KAZ)	10–0	19 August 2016	2016 Summer Olympics	(Brazil) Rio de Janeiro
Win	44–3	Soner Demirtaş (TUR)	7–0	19 August 2016	2016 Summer Olympics	(Brazil) Rio de Janeiro
Win	43–3	Asnage Castelly (HAI)	10–0	19 August 2016	2016 Summer Olympics	(Brazil) Rio de Janeiro
(gold) Gold Medal (with Iran) at 74 kg
Win	42–3	Khetag Tsabolov (RUS)	14–4	12 June 2016	2016 World Cup	(United States) Los Angeles
Win	41–3	Alex Dieringer (USA)	10–0	12 June 2016	2016 World Cup	(United States) Los Angeles
Win	40–3	Parveen Rana (IND)	12–2	11 June 2016	2016 World Cup	(United States) Los Angeles
Win	39–3	Ashraf Aliyev (AZE)	9–5	11 June 2016	2016 World Cup	(United States) Los Angeles
Winners at 74 kg
Win	38–3	Mostafa Hosseinkhani (IRI)	2–0	15 April 2016	2016 Iran Olympic Trials	(Iran) Tehran
Win	37–3	Mostafa Hosseinkhani (IRI)	5–1	15 April 2016	2016 Iran Olympic Trials	(Iran) Tehran
(silver) Silver Medal at 74 kg
Loss	36–3	Khetag Tsabolov (RUS)	2–2, Fall	18 February 2016	2016 Aleksandr Medved's Prizes	(Belarus) Minsk
Win	36–2	Arsalan Budazhapov (RUS)	8–1	18 February 2016	2016 Aleksandr Medved's Prizes	(Belarus) Minsk
Win	35–2	Soner Demirtaş (TUR)	12–2	18 February 2016	2016 Aleksandr Medved's Prizes	(Belarus) Minsk
Win	34–2	Bekzod Abdurakhmonov (UZB)	10–5	18 February 2016	2016 Aleksandr Medved's Prizes	(Belarus) Minsk
Win	33–2	Tajudin Akaev (RUS)	10–4	18 February 2016	2016 Aleksandr Medved's Prizes	(Belarus) Minsk
Win	32–2	Martin Obst (GER)	10–0	18 February 2016	2016 Aleksandr Medved's Prizes	(Belarus) Minsk
(silver) Silver Medal at 74 kg
Loss	31–2	Ali Shabanau (BLR)	6–6	30 January 2016	2016 Paris Tournament	(France) Paris
Win	31–1	Alireza Ghasemi (IRI)	8–0	30 January 2016	2016 Paris Tournament	(France) Paris
Win	30–1	Alberto Martínez (ESP)	10–0, Fall	30 January 2016	2016 Paris Tournament	(France) Paris
Win	29–1	Chris Perry (USA)	9–4	30 January 2016	2016 Paris Tournament	(France) Paris
(silver) Silver Medal at 70 kg
Loss	28–1	Magomedrasul Gazimagomedov (RUS)	3–10	12 September 2015	2015 World Championships	(United States) Las Vegas
Win	28–0	James Green (USA)	9–4	12 September 2015	2015 World Championships	(United States) Las Vegas
Win	27–0	Davit Tlashadze (GEO)	6–0, Fall	12 September 2015	2015 World Championships	(United States) Las Vegas
Win	26–0	Miroslav Kirov (BUL)	6–1, Fall	12 September 2015	2015 World Championships	(United States) Las Vegas
Win	25–0	Jung Young-ho (KOR)	16–4	12 September 2015	2015 World Championships	(United States) Las Vegas
Winners at 70 kg
Win		Mehdi Taghavi (IRI)	Walkover	12 June 2015	2015 Iran World Team Trials	(Iran) Mashhad
Win	24–0	Mehdi Taghavi (IRI)	6–4	12 June 2015	2015 Iran World Team Trials	(Iran) Mashhad
Win	23–0	Iman Rahmanizadeh (IRI)	10–0	11 June 2015	2015 Iran World Team Trials	(Iran) Mashhad
Win	22–0	Masoud Kamarvand (IRI)	11–0	11 June 2015	2015 Iran World Team Trials	(Iran) Mashhad
Win	21–0	Morteza Goudarzi (IRI)	10–0	11 June 2015	2015 Iran World Team Trials	(Iran) Mashhad
(gold) Gold Medal (with Iran) at 70 kg
Win	20–0	Nick Marable (USA)	3–1	12 April 2015	2015 World Cup	(United States) Los Angeles
Win	19–0	Ruslan Dibirgadjiyev (AZE)	10–8	12 April 2015	2015 World Cup	(United States) Los Angeles
Win	18–0	Zhan Safian (BLR)	12–1	11 April 2015	2015 World Cup	(United States) Los Angeles
(gold) Gold Medal at 70 kg
Win	17–0	Iman Rahmanizadeh (IRI)	11–0	13 February 2015	2015 Takhti Cup	(Iran) Kermanshah
Win	16–0	Alexander Jachvadze (GEO)	8–2, Fall	13 February 2015	2015 Takhti Cup	(Iran) Kermanshah
Win	15–0	Abbas Yazdani (IRI)	11–0	13 February 2015	2015 Takhti Cup	(Iran) Kermanshah
Win	14–0	Kamran Yunusov (AZE)	13–2	13 February 2015	2015 Takhti Cup	(Iran) Kermanshah
(gold) Gold Medal at 70 kg
Win	13–0	Magomedmurad Gadzhiev (POL)	8–0	1 February 2015	2015 Paris Grand Prix	(France) Paris
Win	12–0	Adam Hall (USA)	11–0	1 February 2015	2015 Paris Grand Prix	(France) Paris
Win	11–0	Giorgi Jikuri (GEO)	13–2	1 February 2015	2015 Paris Grand Prix	(France) Paris
Win	10–0	Arkadiusz Szeja (POL)	2–0, Fall	1 February 2015	2015 Paris Grand Prix	(France) Paris
5th Place (with Kefayati Club) at 70 kg
Win	9–0	Gantulgyn Iderkhüü (MGL)	11–1, Fall	28 November 2014	2014 World Clubs Cup	(Iran) Jouybar
Win	8–0	Morteza Goudarzi (IRI)	11–0, Fall	28 November 2014	2014 World Clubs Cup	(Iran) Jouybar
Win	7–0	Andy Moreno (CUB)	10–0	27 November 2014	2014 World Clubs Cup	(Iran) Jouybar
Win	6–0	Cédric Nimpagaritse (BDI)	10–0	27 November 2014	2014 World Clubs Cup	(Iran) Jouybar
4th Place (with Gaz Mazandaran Club) at 70 kg
Win	5–0	Khetag Tsabolov (RUS)	19–10	31 October 2014	2014 Iranian Premier League	(Iran) Hamedan
Win	4–0	Mostafa Sheikh-Chalandar (IRI)	14–3, Fall	30 October 2014	2014 Iranian Premier League	(Iran) Hamedan
Win	3–0	Nima Elahi (IRI)	11–0	30 October 2014	2014 Iranian Premier League	(Iran) Hamedan
Win	2–0	Masoud Kamarvand (IRI)	4–2	30 October 2014	2014 Iranian Premier League	(Iran) Hamedan
Win	1–0	Hamid Reza Zarinpeikar (IRI)	7–0	30 October 2014	2014 Iranian Premier League	(Iran) Hamedan
