= 2023 World Wrestling Championships – Men's freestyle 86 kg =

Wrestling competitions

Men's freestyle 86 kg at the 2023 World Championships
- Venue: Štark Arena
- Dates: 16–17 September 2023
- Competitors: 48 from 45 nations

Medalists
gold medal	David Taylor	United States
silver medal	Hassan Yazdani	Iran
bronze medal	Myles Amine	San Marino
bronze medal	Azamat Dauletbekov	Kazakhstan

The men's freestyle 86 kilograms is a competition featured at the 2023 World Wrestling Championships, and was held in Belgrade, Serbia on 16 and 17 September 2023.

This freestyle wrestling competition consists of a single-elimination tournament, with a repechage used to determine the winner of two bronze medals. The two finalists face off for gold and silver medals. Each wrestler who loses to one of the two finalists moves into the repechage, culminating in a pair of bronze medal matches featuring the semifinal losers each facing the remaining repechage opponent from their half of the bracket.

== Results ==
Legend

- C — Won by 3 cautions given to the opponent
- F — Won by fall
- R — Retired
- WO — Won by walkover

=== Finals ===
Semifinals		Final
Javrail Shapiev (UZB)	0
Hassan Yazdani (IRI)	10	Hassan Yazdani (IRI)	3
Azamat Dauletbekov (KAZ)	0	David Taylor (USA)	9^{F}
David Taylor (USA)	7^{F}

=== Top half ===
==== Section 1 ====
Round of 64
Andrei Franț (ROU)	0
Osman Göçen (TUR)	10
Vladyslav Prus (UKR)	0
Ilia Hristov (BUL)	3
Aimar Andruse (EST)	0
Rasul Tsikhayeu (AIN)	4
Taimuraz Friev (ESP)	11
Muhammad Inam (PAK)	1

Round of 32
Sebastian Jezierzański (POL)	1
Javrail Shapiev (UZB)	4
Osman Göçen (TUR)	12
Ilia Hristov (BUL)	4
Rasul Tsikhayeu (AIN)	6
Taimuraz Friev (ESP)	2
Hayato Ishiguro (JPN)	10
Tariel Gaphrindashvili (GEO)	4

Round of 16
Javrail Shapiev (UZB)	11
Osman Göçen (TUR)	0
Rasul Tsikhayeu (AIN)	2
Hayato Ishiguro (JPN)	4

Quarterfinals
Javrail Shapiev (UZB)	15
Hayato Ishiguro (JPN)	5

==== Section 2 ====
Round of 64
Yurieski Torreblanca (CUB)	0
Döwletmyrat Orazgylyjow (TKM)	4^{F}
Byambasürengiin Bat-Erdene (MGL)	4
Kang Dea-kyu (KOR)	0
Dejan Mitrov (MKD)	0
Sandeep Singh Mann (UWW)	10
Lars Schäfle (GER)	3
Lin Zushen (CHN)	4

Round of 32
Hassan Yazdani (IRI)	8^{F}
Jayden Lawrence (AUS)	2
Döwletmyrat Orazgylyjow (TKM)	9
Byambasürengiin Bat-Erdene (MGL)	14
Sandeep Singh Mann (UWW)	0
Lin Zushen (CHN)	11
Noel Torres (MEX)	0
Myles Amine (SMR)	10^{C}

Round of 16
Hassan Yazdani (IRI)	11
Byambasürengiin Bat-Erdene (MGL)	0
Lin Zushen (CHN)	4
Myles Amine (SMR)	7

Quarterfinals
Hassan Yazdani (IRI)	7
Myles Amine (SMR)	2

=== Bottom half ===
==== Section 3 ====
Round of 64
Ivan Ichizli (MDA)	1
Arslan Bagaev (AIN)	5
Pedro Ceballos (VEN)	4
Ethan Ramos (PUR)	4
Rakhim Magamadov (FRA)	10
Matteo Monteiro (CPV)	0
Stefan Reichmuth (SUI)	4
Carlos Izquierdo (COL)	5^{F}

Round of 32
Azamat Dauletbekov (KAZ)	9
Domantas Pauliuščenko (LTU)	0
Arslan Bagaev (AIN)	12
Ethan Ramos (PUR)	2
Rakhim Magamadov (FRA)	11
Carlos Izquierdo (COL)	4
Alex Moore (CAN)	2
Abubakr Abakarov (AZE)	12

Round of 16
Azamat Dauletbekov (KAZ)	4^{F}
Arslan Bagaev (AIN)	0
Rakhim Magamadov (FRA)	9
Abubakr Abakarov (AZE)	6^{R}

Quarterfinals
Azamat Dauletbekov (KAZ)	10
Rakhim Magamadov (FRA)	0

==== Section 4 ====
Round of 64
Patrik Püspöki (HUN)	7^{F}
Ivan Masakwe (UGA)	0
Narbek Izabekov (KGZ)
Benjamin Greil (AUT)	WO
William Raffi (ITA)	10
Mark Inguyesi (KEN)	0
Ivars Samušonoks (LAT)	4
Magomed Sharipov (BRN)	9

Round of 32
David Taylor (USA)	2^{F}
Sofiane Padiou Belmir (MAR)	0
Patrik Püspöki (HUN)	0
Benjamin Greil (AUT)	3
William Raffi (ITA)	0
Magomed Sharipov (BRN)	10
Matt Finesilver (ISR)	1
Boris Makoev (SVK)	12

Round of 16
David Taylor (USA)	10
Benjamin Greil (AUT)	0
Magomed Sharipov (BRN)	5
Boris Makoev (SVK)	4

Quarterfinals
David Taylor (USA)	12
Magomed Sharipov (BRN)	2

=== Repechage ===
Repechage round 2
Jayden Lawrence (AUS)	1
Byambasürengiin Bat-Erdene (MGL)	3^{F}
Sofiane Padiou Belmir (MAR)	0
Benjamin Greil (AUT)	10

Repechage round 3
Byambasürengiin Bat-Erdene (MGL)	2
Myles Amine (SMR)	8
Benjamin Greil (AUT)	0
Magomed Sharipov (BRN)	10

Bronze medals
Myles Amine (SMR)	8
Javrail Shapiev (UZB)	5
Magomed Sharipov (BRN)	3
Azamat Dauletbekov (KAZ)	5

Olympic wrestle-off
Javrail Shapiev (UZB)	3
Magomed Sharipov (BRN)	1

== Final standing ==
Rank	Athlete
1st place, gold medalist(s)	David Taylor (USA)
2nd place, silver medalist(s)	Hassan Yazdani (IRI)
3rd place, bronze medalist(s)	Myles Amine (SMR)
3rd place, bronze medalist(s)	Azamat Dauletbekov (KAZ)
5	Javrail Shapiev (UZB)
5	Magomed Sharipov (BRN)
7	Byambasürengiin Bat-Erdene (MGL)
8	Rakhim Magamadov (FRA)
9	Benjamin Greil (AUT)
10	Lin Zushen (CHN)
11	Osman Göçen (TUR)
12	Arslan Bagaev (AIN)
13	Hayato Ishiguro (JPN)
14	Rasul Tsikhayeu (AIN)
15	Döwletmyrat Orazgylyjow (TKM)
16	Carlos Izquierdo (COL)
17	Patrik Püspöki (HUN)
18	Boris Makoev (SVK)
19	Taimuraz Friev (ESP)
20	Abubakr Abakarov (AZE)
21	William Raffi (ITA)
22	Sandeep Singh Mann (UWW)
23	Ilia Hristov (BUL)
24	Ethan Ramos (PUR)
25	Pedro Ceballos (VEN)
26	Ivars Samušonoks (LAT)
27	Tariel Gaphrindashvili (GEO)
28	Lars Schäfle (GER)
29	Alex Moore (CAN)
30	Sebastian Jezierzański (POL)
31	Ivan Ichizli (MDA)
32	Muhammad Inam (PAK)
33	Matt Finesilver (ISR)
34	Stefan Reichmuth (SUI)
35	Jayden Lawrence (AUS)
36	Narbek Izabekov (KGZ)
37	Vladyslav Prus (UKR)
38	Aimar Andruse (EST)
39	Yurieski Torreblanca (CUB)
40	Kang Dea-kyu (KOR)
41	Ivan Masakwe (UGA)
42	Domantas Pauliuščenko (LTU)
43	Andrei Franț (ROU)
44	Dejan Mitrov (MKD)
45	Noel Torres (MEX)
46	Matteo Monteiro (CPV)
47	Mark Inguyesi (KEN)
48	Sofiane Padiou Belmir (MAR)

Qualified for the 2024 Summer Olympics
