= Iran at the 2020 Summer Olympics =

- IOC code: IRI
- NOC: National Olympic Committee of the Islamic Republic of Iran
- Website: www.olympic.ir (in Persian and English)

in Tokyo, Japan July 23, 2021 – August 8, 2021
- Competitors: 65 in 17 sports
- Flag bearers (opening): Samad Nikkhah Bahrami; Hanieh Rostamian
- Flag bearer (closing): Amir Hossein Zare
- Medals Ranked 27th: Gold 3 Silver 2 Bronze 2 Total 7

Summer Olympics appearances (overview)
- 1900; 1904–1936; 1948; 1952; 1956; 1960; 1964; 1968; 1972; 1976; 1980–1984; 1988; 1992; 1996; 2000; 2004; 2008; 2012; 2016; 2020; 2024; 2028

Iran competed at the 2020 Summer Olympics in Tokyo. Originally scheduled to take place during the summer of 2020, the Games were postponed to 23 July to 8 August 2021, because of the COVID-19 pandemic. Since the nation's return in 1948 after having made their debut in 1900, Iranian athletes have attended every edition of the Summer Olympic Games, with the exception of 1980 and 1984 which they boycotted.

== Medalists ==
Medal	Name	Sport	Event	Date
Gold	Javad Foroughi	Shooting	Men's 10 m air pistol	24 July
Gold	Mohammad Reza Geraei	Wrestling	Men's Greco-Roman 67 kg	4 August
Gold	Sajjad Ganjzadeh	Karate	Men's +75 kg	7 August
Silver	Ali Davoudi	Weightlifting	Men's +109 kg	4 August
Silver	Hassan Yazdani	Wrestling	Men's freestyle 86 kg	5 August
Bronze	Mohammad Hadi Saravi	Wrestling	Men's Greco-Roman 97 kg	3 August
Bronze	Amir Hossein Zare	Wrestling	Men's freestyle 125 kg	6 August

== Competitors ==
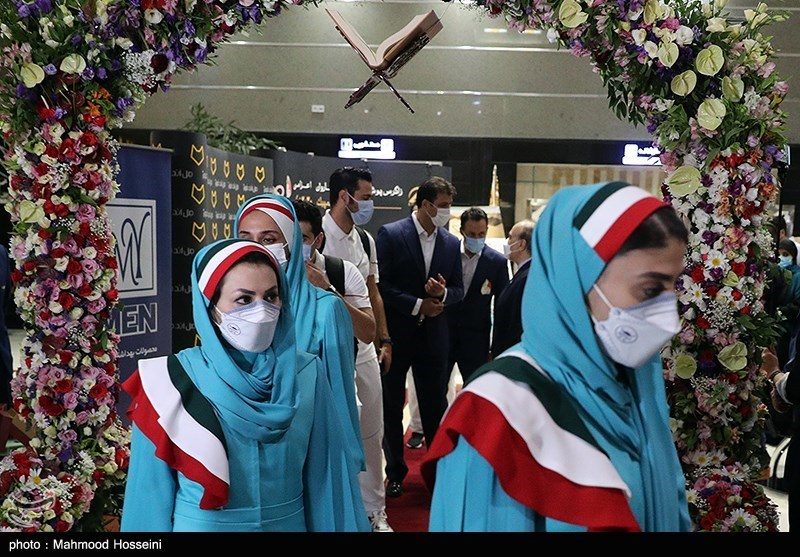
Sending-off of the Iranian delegation to the 2020 Summer Olympics

Sport	Men	Women	Total
Archery	1	0	1
Athletics	2	1	3
Badminton	0	1	1
Basketball	12	0	12
Boxing	2	0	2
Canoeing	1	0	1
Cycling	1	0	1
Fencing	4	0	4
Karate	1	2	3
Rowing	0	1	1
Shooting	2	4	6
Swimming	1	0	1
Table Tennis	1	0	1
Taekwondo	2	1	3
Volleyball	12	0	12
Weightlifting	2	0	2
Wrestling	11	0	11
Total	55	10	65

== Archery ==
One Iranian archer qualified for the men's individual recurve by advancing to the semifinal stage and obtaining one of the three available spots at the 2019 Asian Championships in Bangkok, Thailand.

Athlete	Event	Ranking round		Round of 64	Round of 32	Round of 16	Quarterfinals	Semifinals	Final / BM	
Athlete	Event	Score	Seed	Opposition Score	Opposition Score	Opposition Score	Opposition Score	Opposition Score	Opposition Score	Rank
Milad Vaziri	Men's individual	629	63	Ellison (USA); L 0–6	Did not advance					

== Athletics ==
Iranian athletes further achieved the entry standards, either by qualifying time or by world ranking, in the following track and field events (up to a maximum of 3 athletes in each event):

Key

- Note–Ranks given for track events are within the athlete's heat only
- Q = Qualified for the next round
- q = Qualified for the next round as a fastest loser or, in field events, by position without achieving the qualifying target
- NR = National record
- N/A = Round not applicable for the event
- Bye = Athlete not required to compete in round

Track & road events

Athlete	Event	Heat		Quarterfinal		Semifinal		Final	
Athlete	Event	Result	Rank	Result	Rank	Result	Rank	Result	Rank
Hassan Taftian	Men's 100 m	Bye		10.19	4	Did not advance			
Mahdi Pirjahan	Men's 400 m hurdles	Withdrew ‌‌‌‌‌after testing positive for COVID-19							
Farzaneh Fasihi	Women's 100 m	11.76	1 Q	11.79	8	Did not advance			

Field events

Athlete	Event	Qualification		Final	
Athlete	Event	Distance	Position	Distance	Position
Ehsan Haddadi	Men's discus throw	58.98	26	Did not advance	

== Badminton ==
Iranian women's badminton player, Sorayya Aghaei, got the allocation quotas from the Badminton World Federation after Airi Mikkela withdrew. She is the first ever women's badminton player to represent Iran at the Olympic Games.

Athlete	Event	Group Stage			Elimination	Quarterfinal	Semifinal	Final / BM	
Athlete	Event	Opposition Score	Opposition Score	Rank	Opposition Score	Opposition Score	Opposition Score	Opposition Score	Rank
Sorayya Aghaei	Women's singles	Abdul Razzaq (MDV); W (21–14, 21–7)	He Bj (CHN); L (11–21, 3–21)	2	Did not advance				

== Basketball ==
=== Indoor ===
Summary

Team	Event	Group stage				Quarterfinal	Semifinal	Final / BM	
Team	Event	Opposition Score	Opposition Score	Opposition Score	Rank	Opposition Score	Opposition Score	Opposition Score	Rank
Iran men's	Men's tournament	Czech Republic; L 78–84	United States; L 66–120	France; L 62–79	4	Did not advance			

==== Men's tournament ====
Iran men's basketball team qualified for the Olympics as the highest-ranked Asian squad at the 2019 FIBA World Cup in China, marking the country's return to the sport after a twelve-year absence.

Team roster

The roster was announced on 3 July 2021.

Iran men's national basketball team roster
Players
Coaches

Pos.	No.	Name	Age – Date of birth	Height	Club	Ctr.
G	3	Sina Vahedi	20 – 8 January 2001	1.91 m (6 ft 3 in)	Shahrdari Gorgan	(Iran)
PG	5	Philip Jalalpoor	28 – 14 June 1993	1.85 m (6 ft 1 in)	Medi Bayreuth	(Germany)
PF	7	Mohammad Hassanzadeh	30 – 6 October 1990	2.01 m (6 ft 7 in)	Palayesh Naft Abadan	(Iran)
SF	8	Saeid Davarpanah	33 – 7 September 1987	1.90 m (6 ft 3 in)	Palayesh Naft Abadan	(Iran)
G	13	Mohammad Jamshidi	29 – 30 July 1991	1.99 m (6 ft 6 in)	Shahrdari Gorgan	(Iran)
SF	14	Samad Nikkhah Bahrami (C)	38 – 11 May 1983	1.98 m (6 ft 6 in)	Mahram Tehran	(Iran)
C	15	Hamed Haddadi	36 – 19 May 1985	2.18 m (7 ft 2 in)	Sichuan Blue Whales	(China)
SG	17	Navid Rezaeifar	24 – 23 August 1996	1.91 m (6 ft 3 in)	Shahrdari Gorgan	(Iran)
PF	20	Mike Rostampour	29 – 20 December 1991	2.10 m (6 ft 11 in)	Shahrdari Gorgan	(Iran)
C	23	Aaron Geramipoor	28 – 11 September 1992	2.14 m (7 ft 0 in)	Manchester Giants	(United Kingdom)
PF	41	Arsalan Kazemi	31 – 22 April 1990	2.01 m (6 ft 7 in)	Chemidor Qom	(Iran)
G	88	Behnam Yakhchali	26 – 12 July 1995	1.91 m (6 ft 3 in)	Rostock Seawolves	(Germany)

Head coach

- (Iran) Mehran Shahintab

Assistant coach(es)

- (Iran) Mehrad Atashi
- (Iran) Farzad Kouhian

Legend

- Club – describes last
  club before the tournament
- Age – describes age
  on 25 July 2021

Group play

Pos	Team	Pld	W	L	PF	PA	PD	Pts	Qualification
1	France	3	3	0	259	215	+44	6	Quarterfinals
2	United States	3	2	1	315	233	+82	5	Quarterfinals
3	Czech Republic	3	1	2	245	294	−49	4	
4	Iran	3	0	3	206	283	−77	3	

Source: TOCOG and FIBA
Rules for classification: 1) classification points; 2) head-to-head results; 3) head-to-head game points difference; 4) head-to-head number of game points scored.

25 July 2021
10:00
v

Boxscore

Iran	78–84	Czech Republic
Scoring by quarter: 19–25, 11–21, 16–21, 32–17
Pts: Yakhchali 23; Rebs: Haddadi 10; Asts: Jamshidi 7		Pts: Auda 16; Rebs: Balvín, Satoranský 8 Asts: Satoranský 8

Saitama Super Arena, Saitama
Referees: Matthew Kallio (CAN), Scott Beker (AUS), Yener Yılmaz (TUR)

28 July 2021
13:40
v

Boxscore

United States	120–66	Iran
Scoring by quarter: 28–12, 32–18, 22–13, 38–23
Pts: Lillard 21; Rebs: Booker, Durant 5 Asts: LaVine 8		Pts: Haddadi, Jamshidi 14; Rebs: Haddadi 7 Asts: Jalalpoor, Jamshidi 3

Saitama Super Arena, Saitama
Referees: Antonio Conde (ESP), Yohan Rosso (FRA), Andreia Silva (BRA)

31 July 2021
10:00
v

Boxscore

Iran	62–79	France
Scoring by quarter: 17–22, 10–24, 20–16, 15–17
Pts: Haddadi 18; Rebs: Haddadi 12; Asts: Haddadi 5		Pts: Heurtel 16; Rebs: four players 5 Asts: De Colo 5

Saitama Super Arena, Saitama
Referees: Guilherme Locatelli (BRA), Leandro Lezcano (ARG), Rabah Noujaim (LIB)

== Boxing ==
Iran entered two male boxers into the Olympic tournament. 19-year-old Danial Shahbakhsh (men's featherweight) and Asia's second-seeded boxer Seyed Shahin Mousavi (men's middleweight) secured the spots on the Iranian squad, by scoring a box-off triumph each in their respective weight divisions at the 2020 Asia & Oceania Qualification Tournament in Amman, Jordan.

Athlete	Event	Round of 32	Round of 16	Quarterfinals	Semifinals	Final	
Athlete	Event	Opposition Result	Opposition Result	Opposition Result	Opposition Result	Opposition Result	Rank
Danial Shahbakhsh	Men's featherweight	Hamout (MAR); W 5–0	Álvarez (CUB); L RSC-I	Did not advance			
Seyed Shahin Mousavi	Men's middleweight	Moriwaki (JPN); L 2–3	Did not advance				

== Canoeing ==
=== Sprint ===
Iran qualified a single boat (men's K-1 1000 m) for the Games by winning the gold medal at the 2021 Asian Canoe Sprint Qualification Regatta in Pattaya, Thailand.

Athlete	Event	Heats		Quarterfinals		Semifinals		Final	
Athlete	Event	Time	Rank	Time	Rank	Time	Rank	Time	Rank
Ali Aghamirzaei	Men's K-1 1000 m	3:48.609	5 QF	3:52.834	4	Did not advance			

Qualification Legend: FA = Qualify to final (medal); FB = Qualify to final B (non-medal)

== Cycling ==
=== Road ===
Iran entered one rider to compete in the men's Olympic road race, by virtue of his top 50 national finish (for men) in the UCI World Ranking.

Athlete	Event	Time	Rank
Saeid Safarzadeh	Men's road race	Did not finish	
Saeid Safarzadeh	Men's time trial	1:05:14.62	35

== Fencing ==
Iranian fencers qualified a full squad in the men's team sabre for the first time at the Games, as the highest-ranked nation from Asia outside the world's top four in the FIE Olympic Team Rankings.

Athlete	Event	Round of 64	Round of 32	Round of 16	Quarterfinal	Semifinal	Final / BM	
Athlete	Event	Opposition Score	Opposition Score	Opposition Score	Opposition Score	Opposition Score	Opposition Score	Rank
Mojtaba Abedini	Men's sabre	Bye	Gordon (CAN); W 15–10	Szilágyi (HUN); L 7–15	Did not advance			
Ali Pakdaman	Men's sabre	Bye	Szatmári (HUN); W 15–12	Hartung (GER); W 15–9	Szilágyi (HUN); L 6–15	Did not advance		
Mohammad Rahbari	Men's sabre	Bye	Apithy (FRA); W 15–13	Samele (ITA); L 7–15	Did not advance			
Mojtaba Abedini; Ali Pakdaman; Mohammad Rahbari; Mohammad Fotouhi*	Men's team sabre	—N/a			Italy; L 44–45	Classification semifinal United States; W 45–36	Fifth place final Egypt; L 24–45	6

== Karate ==
Iran entered three karateka into the inaugural Olympic tournament. Sajjad Ganjzadeh (men's +75 kg), Sara Bahmanyar (women's 55 kg), and Hamideh Abbasali (women's +61 kg) qualified directly for their respective kumite categories by finishing among the top four karateka at the end of the combined WKF Olympic Rankings.

Kumite

Athlete	Event	Group stage					Semifinals	Final	
Athlete	Event	Opposition Result	Opposition Result	Opposition Result	Opposition Result	Rank	Opposition Result	Opposition Result	Rank
Sajjad Ganjzadeh	Men's +75 kg	Kvesić (CRO); W 3–1	Hamedi (KSA); D 0–0	Irr (USA); W 6–0	Gaysinsky (CAN); W 2–1	1 Q	Aktaş (TUR); W 2–2	Hamedi (KSA); W 4–0 HAN	1st place, gold medalist(s)
Sara Bahmanyar	Women's −55 kg	Özçelik (TUR); W 5–4	Wen T-y (TPE); L 1–5	Goranova (BUL); L 2–5	—N/a	3	Did not advance		
Hamideh Abbasali	Women's +61 kg	Matoub (ALG); W 4–0	Quirici (SUI); L 0–4	Abdelaziz (EGY); W 9–7	Gong L (CHN); L 4–8	4	Did not advance		

== Rowing ==
Iran qualified one boat in the women's single sculls for the Games by winning the silver medal and securing the second of five berths available at the 2021 FISA Asia & Oceania Olympic Qualification Regatta in Tokyo, Japan.

Athlete	Event	Heats		Repechage		Quarterfinals		Semifinals		Final	
Athlete	Event	Time	Rank	Time	Rank	Time	Rank	Time	Rank	Time	Rank
Nazanin Malaei	Women's single sculls	7:59.01	3 QF	Bye		8:07.32	3 SA/B	7:45.52	6 FB	7:42.57	11

Qualification Legend: FA=Final A (medal); FB=Final B (non-medal); FC=Final C (non-medal); FD=Final D (non-medal); FE=Final E (non-medal); FF=Final F (non-medal); SA/B=Semifinals A/B; SC/D=Semifinals C/D; SE/F=Semifinals E/F; QF=Quarterfinals; R=Repechage

== Shooting ==
Iranian shooters achieved quota places for the following events by virtue of their best finishes at the 2018 ISSF World Championships, the 2019 ISSF World Cup series, and Asian Championships, as long as they obtained a minimum qualifying score (MQS) by May 31, 2020.

Athlete	Event	Qualification		Semifinal		Final	
Athlete	Event	Points	Rank	Points	Rank	Points	Rank
Javad Foroughi	Men's 10 m air pistol	580	5 Q	—N/a		244.8 OR	1st place, gold medalist(s)
Mahyar Sedaghat	Men's 10 m air rifle	629.1	9	—N/a		Did not advance	
Mahyar Sedaghat	Men's 50 m rifle 3 positions	1168	20	—N/a		Did not advance	
Fatemeh Karamzadeh	Women's 50 m rifle 3 positions	1163	22	—N/a		Did not advance	
Fatemeh Karamzadeh	Women's 10 m air rifle	624.9	23	—N/a		Did not advance	
Najmeh Khedmati	Women's 50 m rifle 3 positions	1165	18	—N/a		Did not advance	
Hanieh Rostamian	Women's 10 m air pistol	576	10	—N/a		Did not advance	
Hanieh Rostamian	Women's 25 m pistol	577	28	—N/a		Did not advance	
Armina Sadeghian	Women's 10 m air rifle	622.6	30	—N/a		Did not advance	
Mahyar Sedaghat; Najmeh Khedmati	Mixed 10 m air rifle team	624.9	15	Did not advance			
Javad Foroughi; Hanieh Rostamian	Mixed 10 m air pistol team	575	8 Q	382	5	Did not advance	

== Swimming ==
Iran received a‌n Universality invitation from FINA to send a male swimmer to the 2020 Summer Olympics.

Athlete	Event	Heat		Semifinal		Final	
Athlete	Event	Time	Rank	Time	Rank	Time	Rank
Matin Balsini	Men's 200 m butterfly	1:59.97 NR	33	Did not advance			

== Table tennis ==
Iran entered one athlete into the table tennis competition at the Games. Rio 2016 Olympian Nima Alamian scored a zonal-match triumph for Central Asia to book a men's singles spot at the Asian Qualification Tournament in Doha, Qatar.

Athlete	Event	Preliminary	Round 1	Round 2	Round 3	Round of 16	Quarterfinals	Semifinals	Final / BM	
Athlete	Event	Opposition Result	Opposition Result	Opposition Result	Opposition Result	Opposition Result	Opposition Result	Opposition Result	Opposition Result	Rank
Nima Alamian	Men's singles	Bye	Drinkhall (GBR); L 1–4	Did not advance						

== Taekwondo ==
Iran entered three athletes into the taekwondo competition at the Games. Armin Hadipour (men's 58 kg) qualified directly for their respective weight classes by finishing among the top five, while Mirhashem Hosseini received a spare berth freed up by the 2019 World Grand Slam winner in the men's lightweight category (68 kg), as the next highest-placed taekwondo practitioner, not yet qualified, in the WT Olympic Rankings. On the women's side, Nahid Kiani scored a semifinal victory in the lightweight category (57 kg) to book the remaining spot on the Iranian taekwondo squad at the 2021 Asian Qualification Tournament in Amman, Jordan.

Athlete	Event	Qualification	Round of 16	Quarterfinals	Semifinals	Repechage	Final / BM	
Athlete	Event	Opposition Result	Opposition Result	Opposition Result	Opposition Result	Opposition Result	Opposition Result	Rank
Armin Hadipour	Men's −58 kg	—N/a	Ochoa (COL); W 22–19	Guzmán (ARG); L 6–26	Did not advance			
Mirhashem Hosseini	Men's −68 kg	—N/a	Huang Y-j (TPE); W 18–15	Rashitov (UZB); L 22–34	Did not advance	Lee D-h (KOR); L 21–30	Did not advance	7
Nahid Kiani	Women's −57 kg	Alizadeh (EOR); L 9–18	Did not advance					

== Volleyball ==
=== Indoor ===
Summary

Team	Event	Group stage						Quarterfinal	Semifinal	Final / BM	
Team	Event	Opposition Score	Opposition Score	Opposition Score	Opposition Score	Opposition Score	Rank	Opposition Score	Opposition Score	Opposition Score	Rank
Iran men's	Men's tournament	Poland; W 3–2	Venezuela; W 3–0	Canada; L 0–3	Italy; L 1–3	Japan; L 2–3	5	Did not advance			

==== Men's tournament ====
Iran men's volleyball team qualified for the Olympics by winning the final match and securing an outright berth at the Asian Olympic Qualification Tournament in Jiangmen, China.

Team roster

The Iran roster was announced on 11 July 2021.

Head coach: (Russia) Vladimir Alekno

- 2 Milad Ebadipour OH
- 4 Saeid Marouf (c) S
- 6 Mohammad Mousavi MB
- 9 Masoud Gholami MB
- 10 Amir Ghafour OP
- 11 Saber Kazemi OP
- 12 Morteza Sharifi OH
- 15 Ali Asghar Mojarrad MB
- 17 Meisam Salehi OH
- 19 Mehdi Marandi L
- 21 Arman Salehi L
- 24 Javad Karimi S

Group play

Pos	Team	Pld	W	L	Pts	SW	SL	SR	SPW	SPL	SPR	Qualification
1	Poland	5	4	1	13	14	4	3.500	435	365	1.192	Quarterfinals
2	Italy	5	4	1	11	12	7	1.714	447	411	1.088	Quarterfinals
3	Japan (H)	5	3	2	8	10	9	1.111	437	433	1.009	Quarterfinals
4	Canada	5	2	3	7	9	9	1.000	396	387	1.023	Quarterfinals
5	Iran	5	2	3	6	9	11	0.818	453	460	0.985	
6	Venezuela	5	0	5	0	1	15	0.067	281	393	0.715	

Source: Tokyo 2020 and FIVB
Rules for classification: Tiebreakers
(H) Host

24 July 2021; 19:40 v	Poland	2–3	Iran	Ariake Arena, Tokyo; Referees: Daniele Rapisarda (ITA), Juraj Mokrý (SVK)
24 July 2021; 19:40 v	(25–18, 22–25, 22–25, 25–22, 21–23); Results Statistics			Ariake Arena, Tokyo; Referees: Daniele Rapisarda (ITA), Juraj Mokrý (SVK)

26 July 2021; 09:00 v	Iran	3–0	Venezuela	Ariake Arena, Tokyo; Referees: Hernán Casamiquela (ARG), Susana Rodríguez (ESP)
26 July 2021; 09:00 v	(25–17, 25–20, 25–18); Results Statistics			Ariake Arena, Tokyo; Referees: Hernán Casamiquela (ARG), Susana Rodríguez (ESP)

28 July 2021; 09:00 v	Canada	3–0	Iran	Ariake Arena, Tokyo; Referees: Luis Macias (MEX), Paulo Turci (BRA)
28 July 2021; 09:00 v	(25–16, 25–20, 25–22); Results Statistics			Ariake Arena, Tokyo; Referees: Luis Macias (MEX), Paulo Turci (BRA)

30 July 2021; 19:40 v	Italy	3–1	Iran	Ariake Arena, Tokyo; Referees: Vladimir Simonović (SRB), Denny Cespedes (DOM)
30 July 2021; 19:40 v	(30–28, 25–21, 21–25, 25–21); Results Statistics			Ariake Arena, Tokyo; Referees: Vladimir Simonović (SRB), Denny Cespedes (DOM)

1 August 2021; 19:40 v	Japan	3–2	Iran	Ariake Arena, Tokyo; Referees: Juraj Mokrý (SVK), Daniele Rapisarda (ITA)
1 August 2021; 19:40 v	(25–21, 20–25, 29–31, 25–22, 15–13); Results Statistics			Ariake Arena, Tokyo; Referees: Juraj Mokrý (SVK), Daniele Rapisarda (ITA)

== Weightlifting ==
Iran entered two weightlifters into the Olympic competition. Rio 2016 Olympian and 2017 world champion Ali Hashemi (men's 109 kg) and the reigning Asian champion Ali Davoudi (men's +109 kg) secured one of the top eight slots each in their respective weight divisions based on the IWF Absolute World Rankings.

Athlete	Event	Snatch		Clean & Jerk		Total	Rank
Athlete	Event	Result	Rank	Result	Rank	Total	Rank
Ali Hashemi	Men's –109 kg	184	5	~~228~~	DNF	184	DNF
Ali Davoudi	Men's +109 kg	200	2	241	2	441	2nd place, silver medalist(s)

== Wrestling ==
Iran qualified eleven wrestlers for each of the following classes into the Olympic competition. Five of them finished among the top six to book Olympic spots in the men's freestyle (57 and 86 kg), men's Greco-Roman (60, 77, and 130 kg) at the 2019 World Championships, while five additional licenses were awarded to the Iranian wrestlers, who progressed to the top two finals of their respective weight categories at the 2021 Asian Qualification Tournament in Almaty, Kazakhstan.

On February 19, 2020, United World Wrestling awarded an additional Olympic license to Iran in men's freestyle 125 kg, as a response to the doping violations on the Syrian and Uzbek wrestler at the World Championships.

Key:

- VT (ranking points: 5–0 or 0–5) – Victory by fall.
- VB (ranking points: 5–0 or 0–5) – Victory by injury (VF for forfeit, VA for withdrawal or disqualification)
- PP (ranking points: 3–1 or 1–3) – Decision by points – the loser with technical points.
- PO (ranking points: 3–0 or 0–3) – Decision by points – the loser without technical points.
- ST (ranking points: 4–0 or 0–4) – Great superiority – the loser without technical points and a margin of victory of at least 8 (Greco-Roman) or 10 (freestyle) points.
- SP (ranking points: 4–1 or 1–4) – Technical superiority – the loser with technical points and a margin of victory of at least 8 (Greco-Roman) or 10 (freestyle) points.

Freestyle

Athlete	Event	Round of 16	Quarterfinal	Semifinal	Repechage	Final / BM	
Athlete	Event	Opposition Result	Opposition Result	Opposition Result	Opposition Result	Opposition Result	Rank
Reza Atri	Men's −57 kg	Atlı (TUR); W 3–1 ^{PP}	Bekhbayar (MGL); W 3–1 ^{PP}	Uguev (ROC); L 1–3 ^{PP}	Bye	Gilman (USA); L 1–3 ^{PP}	5
Morteza Ghiasi	Men's −65 kg	Dakhlaoui (TUN); W 3–1 ^{PP}	Punia (IND); L 0–5 ^{VT}	Did not advance			8
Mostafa Hosseinkhani	Men's −74 kg	Dake (USA); L 0–3 ^{PO}	Did not advance				15
Hassan Yazdani	Men's −86 kg	Shapiev (UZB); W 3–1 ^{PP}	Reichmuth (SUI); W 4–1 ^{SP}	Naifonov (ROC); W 3–1 ^{PP}	Bye	Taylor (USA); L 1–3 ^{PP}	2nd place, silver medalist(s)
Mohammad Mohammadian	Men's −97 kg	Odikadze (GEO); L 1–3 ^{PP}	Did not advance				13
Amir Hossein Zare	Men's −125 kg	Khotsianivskyi (UKR); W 3–0 ^{PO}	Shala (KOS); W 4–1 ^{SP}	Petriashvili (GEO); L 1–3 ^{PP}	Bye	Deng Zw (CHN); W 3–0 ^{PO}	3rd place, bronze medalist(s)

Greco-Roman

Athlete	Event	Round of 16	Quarterfinal	Semifinal	Repechage	Final / BM	
Athlete	Event	Opposition Result	Opposition Result	Opposition Result	Opposition Result	Opposition Result	Rank
Alireza Nejati	Men's −60 kg	Melikyan (ARM); L 1–3 ^{PP}	Did not advance				10
Mohammad Reza Geraei	Men's −67 kg	Horta (COL); W 4–0 ^{ST}	Stäbler (GER); W 3–1 ^{PP}	Zoidze (GEO); W 3–1 ^{PP}	Bye	Nasibov (UKR); W 4–1 ^{ST}	1st place, gold medalist(s)
Mohammad Ali Geraei	Men's −77 kg	Peña (CUB); W 3–1 ^{PP}	Starčević (CRO); W 3–1 ^{PP}	Lőrincz (HUN); L 1–3 ^{PP}	Bye	Yabiku (JPN); L 1–4 ^{SP}	5
Mohammad Hadi Saravi	Men's −97 kg	Boudjemlin (ALG); W 4–0 ^{ST}	Kiril Milov (BUL); W 3–0 ^{PO}	Aleksanyan (ARM); L 1–3 ^{PP}	Bye	Savolainen (FIN); W 3–1 ^{PP}	3rd place, bronze medalist(s)
Amin Mirzazadeh	Men's −130 kg	Kim M-s (KOR); W 3–0 ^{PO}	López (CUB); L 0–4 ^{ST}	Did not advance	Alexuc-Ciurariu (ROU); W 3–1 ^{PP}	Kayaalp (TUR); L 1–3 ^{PP}	5

== Demonstration sports ==
=== Taekwondo ===
Team event

A team demonstration event with 5 teams is held. Its medal will not be officially calculated. 5 teams were divided into 2 groups. Iran and Japan are in one group. Iran won against Japan and went to final.

Athlete	Event	Semifinals	Repechage	Final / BM	
Athlete	Event	Opposition Result	Opposition Result	Opposition Result	Rank
Amir Mohammad Bakhshi; Erfan Nazemi; Melika Mirhosseini; Kimia Hemati	Team	Japan; W 52–31	Bye	China; L 22–41	2nd place, silver medalist(s)

== Referees and officials ==
In addition to these athletes, 8 Iranians were invited by different international federations to participate in this event.

Mohammad Mosallaeipour will referee as an Iranian wrestling referee at the 2020 Summer Olympics. Afshin Badiee will serve as a member of the Jury of ITTF and Simin Rezaei will referee in Table tennis.

Also, Majid Naseri Khorram will referee in Cycling in 2020 summer Olympics. Farhad Moradi Shahpar as member of medical commission of the World Swimming Federation (FINA). Ali Moradi (sports executive) as ITO (Technical Representative) in International Weightlifting Federation. Ahmad Donyamali will serve as a board member of the International Canoe Federation, and Pariya Shahriyari will be member of the executive board of FIFA.

== See also ==
- Iran at the 2020 Summer Paralympics
