= Wrestling at the 2020 Summer Olympics – Men's freestyle 86 kg =

Men's freestyle 86 kg at the Games of the XXXII Olympiad
- Venue: Makuhari Messe
- Date: 4–5 August 2021
- Competitors: 16 from 16 nations

Medalists
1st place, gold medalist(s)		David Taylor	United States
2nd place, silver medalist(s)		Hassan Yazdani	Iran
3rd place, bronze medalist(s)		Artur Naifonov	ROC
3rd place, bronze medalist(s)		Myles Amine	San Marino

The men's freestyle 86 kilograms competition at the 2020 Summer Olympics in Tokyo, Japan, took place on 4–5 August 2021 at the Makuhari Messe in Mihama-ku. The qualification rounds were held on 4 August, with medal matches the next day.

This freestyle wrestling competition consists of a single-elimination tournament, with a repechage used to determine the winner of two bronze medals. The two finalists face off for gold and silver medals. Each wrestler who loses to one of the two finalists moves into the repechage, culminating in a pair of bronze medal matches featuring the semifinal losers each facing the remaining repechage opponent from their half of the bracket.

The medals for the competition were presented by the United World Wrestling president Nenad Lalović, IOC Executive Board Member from Serbia, and the medalists' bouquets were presented by Pedro Gama Filho, UWW Board Member from Brazil.

David Taylor from the United States won the gold medal after beating 2016 Olympic Champion Hassan Yazdani from Iran 4–3 in the gold medal match.

== Schedule ==
All times are Japan Standard Time (UTC+09:00)

Date	Time	Event
4 August 2021	11:00	Qualification rounds
4 August 2021	18:15	Semifinals
5 August 2021	11:00	Repechage
5 August 2021	19:30	Finals

== Results ==
=== Main bracket ===
1/8 finals
Hassan Yazdani (IRI)	11
Javrail Shapiev (UZB)	2
Stefan Reichmuth (SUI)	6
Fateh Benferdjallah (ALG)	2
Osman Göçen (TUR)	2
Sosuke Takatani (JPN)	2
Boris Makoev (SVK)	0
Artur Naifonov (ROC)	6
Myles Amine (SMR)	12
Carlos Izquierdo (COL)	2
David Taylor (USA)	11
Ali Shabanau (BLR)	0
Lin Zushen (CHN)	11
Pool Ambrocio (PER)	0
Ekerekeme Agiomor (NGR)	1
Deepak Punia (IND)	12

1/4 finals
Hassan Yazdani (IRI)	12
Stefan Reichmuth (SUI)	1
Osman Göçen (TUR)	1
Artur Naifonov (ROC)	12
Myles Amine (SMR)	2
David Taylor (USA)	12
Lin Zushen (CHN)	3
Deepak Punia (IND)	6

Semifinals
Hassan Yazdani (IRI)	7
Artur Naifonov (ROC)	1
David Taylor (USA)	10
Deepak Punia (IND)	0

Final
Hassan Yazdani (IRI)	3
David Taylor (USA)	4

=== Repechage ===
Repechage
Javrail Shapiev (UZB)	5
Stefan Reichmuth (SUI)	2
Ali Shabanau (BLR)	0
Myles Amine (SMR)	2

Bronze medal matches
Javrail Shapiev (UZB)	0
Artur Naifonov (ROC)	2
Myles Amine (SMR)	4
Deepak Punia (IND)	2

== Final standing ==
Rank	Athlete
1st place, gold medalist(s)	David Taylor (USA)
2nd place, silver medalist(s)	Hassan Yazdani (IRI)
3rd place, bronze medalist(s)	Artur Naifonov (ROC)
3rd place, bronze medalist(s)	Myles Amine (SMR)
5	Javrail Shapiev (UZB)
5	Deepak Punia (IND)
7	Lin Zushen (CHN)
8	Stefan Reichmuth (SUI)
9	Osman Göçen (TUR)
10	Sosuke Takatani (JPN)
11	Fateh Benferdjallah (ALG)
12	Carlos Izquierdo (COL)
13	Ekerekeme Agiomor (NGR)
14	Boris Makoev (SVK)
15	Pool Ambrocio (PER)
16	Ali Shabanau (BLR)
