= 2021 Asian Wrestling Olympic Qualification Tournament =

Wrestling competition held in Almaty, Kazakhstan

- Host city: Almaty, Kazakhstan
- Dates: 9–11 April 2021
- Stadium: Baluan Sholak Sports Palace

The 2021 Asian Wrestling Olympic Qualification Tournament was the fourth and final regional qualifying tournament for the 2020 Summer Olympics. The event was held from 9 to 11 April 2021, in Almaty, Kazakhstan. The 2021 Asian Wrestling Championships were held at the same venue.

== Qualification summary ==
A total of 36 athletes secured a spot in the 2020 Summer Olympics, in Tokyo, Japan. Two spots were given to each of the weight classes in every event. This allows a total of 12 available spots for each event. Every winner and runner-up per class were awarded their place for wrestling, at the 2020 Summer Olympics. Quota places are allocated to the respective NOC and not to the competitor that achieved the place in the qualification event.

NOC	Men's freestyle						Men's Greco-Roman						Women's freestyle						Total
NOC	57	65	74	86	97	125	60	67	77	87	97	130	50	53	57	62	68	76	Total
China	X			X			X			X						X	X		6
India															X	X			2
Iran		X	X		X			X			X								5
Japan									X				X						2
Kazakhstan						X				X				X					3
Kyrgyzstan		X					X		X		X						X	X	6
Mongolia						X							X	X	X			X	5
South Korea								X				X							2
Uzbekistan	X		X	X	X							X							5
Total: 9 NOCs	2	2	2	2	2	2	2	2	2	2	2	2	2	2	2	2	2	2	36

== Men's freestyle ==
=== 57 kg ===
11 April

Round of 16
~~Rei Higuchi (JPN)~~
Tümenbilegiin Tüvshintulga (MGL)	WO

Quarterfinals
Bekbolot Myrzanazar Uulu (KGZ)	6
Muhammad Bilal (PAK)	4
Gulomjon Abdullaev (UZB)	6
Kim Sung-gwon (KOR)	4
Muhamad Ikromov (TJK)	12
Rozgeldi Seýidow (TKM)	1
Tümenbilegiin Tüvshintulga (MGL)	1
Liu Minghu (CHN)	2

Semifinals
Bekbolot Myrzanazar Uulu (KGZ)	4
Gulomjon Abdullaev (UZB)	8
Muhamad Ikromov (TJK)	3
Liu Minghu (CHN)	6

Final
Gulomjon Abdullaev (UZB)	10
Liu Minghu (CHN)	0

Bronze medals
Kim Sung-gwon (KOR)	0
Bekbolot Myrzanazar Uulu (KGZ)	11
Tümenbilegiin Tüvshintulga (MGL)	6
Muhamad Ikromov (TJK)	7

=== 65 kg ===
11 April

Round of 16
Dzhamshed Sharifov (TJK)	0
Ilyas Bekbulatov (UZB)	11
Hussein Al-Azzani (YEM)	0
Hasibagena (CHN)	10

Quarterfinals
Haji Mohamad Ali (BRN)	6
Yun Jun-sik (KOR)	2
Amir Mohammad Yazdani (IRI)	10
Mohammad Abdulkareem (KUW)	0
Ernazar Akmataliev (KGZ)	5
Kerim Hojakow (TKM)	1
Ilyas Bekbulatov (UZB)	10
Hasibagena (CHN)	0

Semifinals
Haji Mohamad Ali (BRN)	0
Amir Mohammad Yazdani (IRI)	10
Ernazar Akmataliev (KGZ)	4^{F}
Ilyas Bekbulatov (UZB)	8

Final
Amir Mohammad Yazdani (IRI)	13
Ernazar Akmataliev (KGZ)	15

Bronze medals
Mohammad Abdulkareem (KUW)	0
Haji Mohamad Ali (BRN)	10
Kerim Hojakow (TKM)	WO
~~Ilyas Bekbulatov (UZB)~~

=== 74 kg ===
11 April

Round of 16
Menghejigan (CHN)	4^{F}
Parinya Chamnanjan (THA)	0
Alymuhammet Öwezmyradow (TKM)	0
Younes Emami (IRI)	10
Abdulrahman Ibrahim (QAT)	0
Sandeep Singh Mann (IND)	11

Quarterfinals
Lee Seung-chul (KOR)	0
Elaman Dogdurbek Uulu (KGZ)	7
Byambasürengiin Bat-Erdene (MGL)	0
Bekzod Abdurakhmonov (UZB)	10
Menghejigan (CHN)	0
Younes Emami (IRI)	11
Sandeep Singh Mann (IND)	6
Gulomdzhon Sharipov (TJK)	2

Semifinals
Elaman Dogdurbek Uulu (KGZ)	2
Bekzod Abdurakhmonov (UZB)	4
Younes Emami (IRI)	10
Sandeep Singh Mann (IND)	0

Final
Bekzod Abdurakhmonov (UZB)
Younes Emami (IRI)	WO

Repechage round 1
Alymuhammet Öwezmyradow (TKM)	6
Menghejigan (CHN)	10

Bronze medals
Byambasürengiin Bat-Erdene (MGL)	2
Elaman Dogdurbek Uulu (KGZ)	2
Menghejigan (CHN)	14
Sandeep Singh Mann (IND)	4

=== 86 kg ===
11 April

Round of 16
Javrail Shapiev (UZB)	7
Domenic Abounader (LBN)	2
Bakhodur Kadirov (TJK)	8^{F}
Abdulkareem Abuidaij (JOR)	7
Gwon Hyeok-beom (KOR)	6
Döwletmyrat Orazgylyjow (TKM)	3

Quarterfinals
Sosuke Takatani (JPN)	2
Ganbaataryn Gankhuyag (MGL)	1
Nurtilek Karypbaev (KGZ)	1
Lin Zushen (CHN)	12
Javrail Shapiev (UZB)	12
Bakhodur Kadirov (TJK)	1
Gwon Hyeok-beom (KOR)	0
Azamat Dauletbekov (KAZ)	10

Semifinals
Sosuke Takatani (JPN)	7
Lin Zushen (CHN)	8
Javrail Shapiev (UZB)	5^{F}
Azamat Dauletbekov (KAZ)	2

Final
Lin Zushen (CHN)	3
Javrail Shapiev (UZB)	7

Repechage round 1
Domenic Abounader (LBN)	2
Bakhodur Kadirov (TJK)	4

Bronze medals
Nurtilek Karypbaev (KGZ)	1
Sosuke Takatani (JPN)	6
Bakhodur Kadirov (TJK)	3
Azamat Dauletbekov (KAZ)	6

=== 97 kg ===
11 April

Round of 16
Mohammad Hossein Mohammadian (IRI)	11
Naoya Akaguma (JPN)	0
Seo Min-won (KOR)	3
Ölziisaikhany Batzul (MGL)	1

Quarterfinals
Magomed Ibragimov (UZB)	8
Muhammad Inam (PAK)	0
Symbat Sulaimanov (KGZ)	5^{F}
Habila Awusayiman (CHN)	0
Zyýamuhammet Saparow (TKM)	4
Mohammad Hossein Mohammadian (IRI)	15
Seo Min-won (KOR)	3
Satyawart Kadian (IND)	6

Semifinals
Magomed Ibragimov (UZB)	11
Symbat Sulaimanov (KGZ)	1
Mohammad Hossein Mohammadian (IRI)	10
Satyawart Kadian (IND)	0

Final
Magomed Ibragimov (UZB)
Mohammad Hossein Mohammadian (IRI)	WO

Repechage round 1
Naoya Akaguma (JPN)	3
Zyýamuhammet Saparow (TKM)	4

Bronze medals
Muhammad Inam (PAK)	10
Symbat Sulaimanov (KGZ)	7
Zyýamuhammet Saparow (TKM)	0
Satyawart Kadian (IND)	5

=== 125 kg ===
11 April

Round of 16
Tetsuya Tanaka (JPN)	4
Şatlyk Hemelýäýew (TKM)	1
Omar Sarem (SYR)	7
Rustam Iskandari (TJK)	10
Mönkhtöriin Lkhagvagerel (MGL)	13
Haroon Abid (PAK)	2

Quarterfinals
Yusup Batirmurzaev (KAZ)	10
Kim Dong-hwan (KOR)	0
Sumit Malik (IND)	7^{C}
Makhsud Veysalov (UZB)	0
Tetsuya Tanaka (JPN)	8
Rustam Iskandari (TJK)	2
Mönkhtöriin Lkhagvagerel (MGL)	7
Aiaal Lazarev (KGZ)	2

Semifinals
Yusup Batirmurzaev (KAZ)	2
Sumit Malik (IND)	0
Tetsuya Tanaka (JPN)	0
Mönkhtöriin Lkhagvagerel (MGL)	9

Final
Yusup Batirmurzaev (KAZ)	4
Mönkhtöriin Lkhagvagerel (MGL)	2

Repechage round 1
Haroon Abid (PAK)	10
Aiaal Lazarev (KGZ)	15^{F}

Bronze medals
Kim Dong-hwan (KOR)	0
Sumit Malik (IND)	5
Aiaal Lazarev (KGZ)	WO
Tetsuya Tanaka (JPN)

== Men's Greco-Roman ==
=== 60 kg ===
9 April

Round of 16
Merdan Allaýarow (TKM)	0
Chung Han-jae (KOR)	11

Quarterfinals
Walihan Sailike (CHN)	9
Mohammad Al-Ajmi (KUW)	0
Firuz Mirzoradzhabov (TJK)	9
Mönkh-Erdeniin Davaabandi (MGL)	0
Huang Jui-chi (TPE)	0
Gyanender Dahiya (IND)	10
Chung Han-jae (KOR)	2
Zholaman Sharshenbekov (KGZ)	6

Semifinals
Walihan Sailike (CHN)	10
Firuz Mirzoradzhabov (TJK)	0
Gyanender Dahiya (IND)	1
Zholaman Sharshenbekov (KGZ)	6

Final
Walihan Sailike (CHN)	3
Zholaman Sharshenbekov (KGZ)	4

Bronze medals
Mohammad Al-Ajmi (KUW)	2
Firuz Mirzoradzhabov (TJK)	4
Chung Han-jae (KOR)	4
Gyanender Dahiya (IND)	3

=== 67 kg ===
9 April

Round of 16
Aram Vardanyan (UZB)	8
Shogo Takahashi (JPN)	7
Meirzhan Shermakhanbet (KAZ)	2
Marlen Asikeev (KGZ)	8
Piyachat Phondet (THA)	0
Ahmad Dahshan (JOR)	9
Sheroz Ochilov (TJK)	0
Mohammad Reza Geraei (IRI)	8
Abdulkarim Al-Hasan (SYR)	1
Tian Qiye (CHN)	3

Quarterfinals
Ryu Han-su (KOR)	9
Azatjan Açilow (TKM)	0
Aram Vardanyan (UZB)	10
Marlen Asikeev (KGZ)	1
Ahmad Dahshan (JOR)	0
Mohammad Reza Geraei (IRI)	8
Tian Qiye (CHN)	3
Ashu Bazard (IND)	5

Semifinals
Ryu Han-su (KOR)	8^{F}
Aram Vardanyan (UZB)	0
Mohammad Reza Geraei (IRI)	9
Ashu Bazard (IND)	0

Final
Ryu Han-su (KOR)	0
Mohammad Reza Geraei (IRI)	9

Repechage round 1
Sheroz Ochilov (TJK)	9
Ahmad Dahshan (JOR)	0

Bronze medals
Azatjan Açilow (TKM)	2
Aram Vardanyan (UZB)	11
Sheroz Ochilov (TJK)	1
Ashu Bazard (IND)	8

=== 77 kg ===
9 April

Round of 16
Bakhit Sharif Badr (QAT)	0
Shohei Yabiku (JPN)	9

Quarterfinals
Rabbia Khalil (PLE)	0
Akzhol Makhmudov (KGZ)	11
Gurpreet Singh (IND)	12^{F}
Kim Hyeon-woo (KOR)	1
Zhang Hujun (CHN)	8
Muhammetberdi Mamedow (TKM)	0
Habibjon Zuhurov (TJK)	3
Shohei Yabiku (JPN)	8

Semifinals
Akzhol Makhmudov (KGZ)	8
Gurpreet Singh (IND)	2
Zhang Hujun (CHN)	2
Shohei Yabiku (JPN)	6

Final
Akzhol Makhmudov (KGZ)	7
Shohei Yabiku (JPN)	3

Repechage round 1
~~Bakhit Sharif Badr (QAT)~~
Habibjon Zuhurov (TJK)	WO

Bronze medals
Rabbia Khalil (PLE)
Gurpreet Singh (IND)	WO
Habibjon Zuhurov (TJK)	5
Zhang Hujun (CHN)	4^{F}

=== 87 kg ===
9 April

Quarterfinals		Semifinals		Final
Sunil Kumar (IND)	7
Sukhrob Abdulkhaev (TJK)	0	Sunil Kumar (IND)	5
Nursultan Tursynov (KAZ)	5	Nursultan Tursynov (KAZ)	9
Masato Sumi (JPN)	3			Nursultan Tursynov (KAZ)	WO
Hossein Nouri (IRI)	9			Peng Fei (CHN)
Şageldi Annaýew (TKM)	0	Hossein Nouri (IRI)	4
Peng Fei (CHN)	9	Peng Fei (CHN)	4
Kim Jin-hyeok (KOR)	0

Bronze medals
Masato Sumi (JPN)	10
Sunil Kumar (IND)	1
Kim Jin-hyeok (KOR)	WO
Hossein Nouri (IRI)

=== 97 kg ===
9 April

Round of 16
Kim Seung-jun (KOR)	1
Olzhas Syrlybay (KAZ)	1

Quarterfinals
Mohammad Hadi Saravi (IRI)	8
Jahongir Turdiev (UZB)	0
Mirzoamin Safarov (TJK)	1
Chen Yanan (CHN)	9
Ravi Rathee (IND)	0
Uzur Dzhuzupbekov (KGZ)	9
Kim Seung-jun (KOR)	4
Yuta Nara (JPN)	3

Semifinals
Mohammad Hadi Saravi (IRI)	10
Chen Yanan (CHN)	2
Uzur Dzhuzupbekov (KGZ)	6
Kim Seung-jun (KOR)	0

Final
Mohammad Hadi Saravi (IRI)	10
Uzur Dzhuzupbekov (KGZ)	0

Bronze medals
Jahongir Turdiev (UZB)	9
Chen Yanan (CHN)	4^{F}
Ravi Rathee (IND)	1
Kim Seung-jun (KOR)	3

=== 130 kg ===
9 April

Pos	Athlete	Pld	W	L	CP	TP	UZB	IND	JPN	KGZ
1	Muminjon Abdullaev (UZB)	3	3	0	13	22	—	9–0	9–0	4–0 Fall
2	Naveen Sevlia (IND)	3	2	1	6	7	0–4 SU	—	1–1	6–3
3	Arata Sonoda (JPN)	3	1	2	4	2	0–4 SU	1–3 PO1	—	1–1
4	Roman Kim (KGZ)	3	0	3	2	4	0–5 FA	1–3 PO1	1–3 PO1	—

Source: UWW

Pos	Athlete	Pld	W	L	CP	TP	KOR	CHN	KAZ
1	Kim Min-seok (KOR)	2	2	0	6	9	—	3–3	6–1
2	Meng Lingzhe (CHN)	2	1	1	4	9	1–3 PO1	—	6–0
3	Georgiy Tsurtsumia (KAZ)	2	0	2	1	1	1–3 PO1	0–3 PO	—

Source: UWW

Semifinals
Muminjon Abdullaev (UZB)	9
Meng Lingzhe (CHN)	0
Kim Min-seok (KOR)	7
Naveen Sevlia (IND)	1

Final
Muminjon Abdullaev (UZB)	WO
Kim Min-seok (KOR)
Bronze medal
Meng Lingzhe (CHN)	5
Naveen Sevlia (IND)	1

== Women's freestyle ==
=== 50 kg ===
10 April

Pos	Athlete	Pld	W	L	CP	TP	JPN	MGL	UZB	IND	KOR
1	Yui Susaki (JPN)	4	4	0	16	41	—	10–0	10–0	10–0	11–0
2	Tsogt-Ochiryn Namuuntsetseg (MGL)	4	3	1	13	30	0–4 SU	—	12–1	8–1 Fall	10–0
3	Dauletbike Yakhshimuratova (UZB)	4	2	2	8	16	0–4 SU	1–4 SU1	—	3–3	12–1
4	Seema Bisla (IND)	4	1	3	6	17	0–4 SU	0–5 FA	1–3 PO1	—	13–2 Fall
5	Cheon Mi-ran (KOR)	4	0	4	1	3	0–4 SU	0–4 SU	1–4 SU1	0–5 FA	—

Source: UWW

=== 53 kg ===
10 April

Pos	Athlete	Pld	W	L	CP	TP	KAZ	MGL	TJK
1	Tatyana Akhmetova-Amanzhol (KAZ)	2	2	0	8	17	—	10–9	7–0 Fall
2	Bat-Ochiryn Bolortuyaa (MGL)	2	1	1	5	19	1–3 PO1	—	10–0
3	Vatansulton Shakarshoeva (TJK)	2	0	2	0	0	0–5 FA	0–4 SU	—

Source: UWW

Pos	Athlete	Pld	W	L	CP	TP	TPE	KOR	UZB
1	Hsieh Meng-hsuan (TPE)	2	2	0	6	21	—	5–0	16–8
2	Kim Hyung-joo (KOR)	2	1	1	3	5	0–3 PO	—	5–3
3	Aktenge Keunimjaeva (UZB)	2	0	2	2	11	1–3 PO1	1–3 PO1	—

Source: UWW

Semifinals
Tatyana Akhmetova-Amanzhol (KAZ)	11
Kim Hyung-joo (KOR)	1
Hsieh Meng-hsuan (TPE)	0
Bat-Ochiryn Bolortuyaa (MGL)	2^{F}

Final
Tatyana Akhmetova-Amanzhol (KAZ)
Bat-Ochiryn Bolortuyaa (MGL)	WO
Bronze medal
Kim Hyung-joo (KOR)
Hsieh Meng-hsuan (TPE)	WO

=== 57 kg ===
10 April

Pos	Athlete	Pld	W	L	CP	TP	IND	KOR	KAZ
1	Anshu Malik (IND)	2	2	0	8	20	—	10–0	10–0
2	Um Ji-eun (KOR)	2	1	1	3	6	0–4 SU	—	6–2
3	Emma Tissina (KAZ)	2	0	2	1	2	0–4 SU	1–3 PO1	—

Source: UWW

Pos	Athlete	Pld	W	L	CP	TP	MGL	UZB	KGZ
1	Boldsaikhan Khongorzul (MGL)	2	2	0	8	20	—	10–0	10–0
2	Shokhida Akhmedova (UZB)	2	1	1	3	6	0–4 SU	—	6–6
3	Nazira Marsbek Kyzy (KGZ)	2	0	2	1	6	0–4 SU	1–3 PO1	—

Source: UWW

Semifinals
Anshu Malik (IND)	12
Shokhida Akhmedova (UZB)	2
Boldsaikhan Khongorzul (MGL)	10^{F}
Um Ji-eun (KOR)	0

Final
Anshu Malik (IND)	4
Boldsaikhan Khongorzul (MGL)	7
Bronze medal
Shokhida Akhmedova (UZB)	4^{F}
Um Ji-eun (KOR)	0

=== 62 kg ===
10 April

Pos	Athlete	Pld	W	L	CP	TP	MGL	KAZ	UZB	KOR
1	Sükheegiin Tserenchimed (MGL)	3	2	1	7	26	—	4–4	12–3	10–6
2	Ayaulym Kassymova (KAZ)	3	2	1	7	18	3–1 PO1	—	5–8	9–0
3	Nabira Esenbaeva (UZB)	3	2	1	7	18	1–3 PO1	3–1 PO1	—	7–0
4	Lee Han-bit (KOR)	3	0	3	1	6	1–3 PO1	0–3 PO	0–3 PO	—

Source: UWW

Pos	Athlete	Pld	W	L	CP	TP	IND	CHN	TPE
1	Sonam Malik (IND)	2	2	0	7	16	—	5–2	11–0
2	Long Jia (CHN)	2	1	1	6	12	1–3 PO1	—	10–0 Fall
3	Pai Hsin-ping (TPE)	2	0	2	0	0	0–4 SU	0–5 FA	—

Source: UWW

Semifinals
Sükheegiin Tserenchimed (MGL)	0
Long Jia (CHN)	10
Sonam Malik (IND)	9
Ayaulym Kassymova (KAZ)	6

Final
Long Jia (CHN)	WO
Sonam Malik (IND)
Bronze medal
Sükheegiin Tserenchimed (MGL)	4
Ayaulym Kassymova (KAZ)	2

=== 68 kg ===
10 April

Pos	Athlete	Pld	W	L	CP	TP	CHN	KGZ	KAZ
1	Zhou Feng (CHN)	2	2	0	6	18	—	7–5	11–2
2	Meerim Zhumanazarova (KGZ)	2	1	1	4	15	1–3 PO1	—	10–3
3	Zhamila Bakbergenova (KAZ)	2	0	2	2	5	1–3 PO1	1–3 PO1	—

Source: UWW

Pos	Athlete	Pld	W	L	CP	TP	IND	KOR	UZB
1	Nisha Dahiya (IND)	2	2	0	7	22	—	13–2	9–4
2	Park Hyeon-yeong (KOR)	2	1	1	4	9	1–4 SU1	—	7–2
3	Svetlana Oknazarova (UZB)	2	0	2	2	6	1–3 PO1	1–3 PO1	—

Source: UWW

Semifinals
Zhou Feng (CHN)	12
Park Hyeon-yeong (KOR)	2
Nisha Dahiya (IND)	3
Meerim Zhumanazarova (KGZ)	13

Final
Zhou Feng (CHN)	8
Meerim Zhumanazarova (KGZ)	0
Bronze medal
Park Hyeon-yeong (KOR)	0
Nisha Dahiya (IND)	8^{F}

=== 76 kg ===
10 April

Pos	Athlete	Pld	W	L	CP	TP	KGZ	MGL	IND	UZB	KOR
1	Aiperi Medet Kyzy (KGZ)	4	4	0	16	42	—	10–0	10–0	10–0	12–1
2	Ochirbatyn Burmaa (MGL)	4	3	1	11	21	0–4 SU	—	5–1	10–1 Fall	6–3
3	Pooja Sihag (IND)	4	2	2	11	13	0–4 SU	1–3 PO1	—	8–2 Fall	4–1 Fall
4	Shakhribonu Ellieva (UZB)	4	1	3	5	5	0–4 SU	0–5 FA	0–5 FA	—	2–4 Fall
5	Jeong Seo-yeon (KOR)	4	0	4	2	9	1–4 SU1	1–3 PO1	0–5 FA	0–5 FA	—

Source: UWW

== See also ==
- 2020 Pan American Wrestling Olympic Qualification Tournament
- 2021 European Wrestling Olympic Qualification Tournament
- 2021 African & Oceania Wrestling Olympic Qualification Tournament
- 2021 World Wrestling Olympic Qualification Tournament
