= 2022 World Wrestling Championships – Men's freestyle 86 kg =

Wrestling competitions

Men's freestyle 86 kg at the 2022 World Championships
- Venue: Štark Arena
- Dates: 15–16 September 2022
- Competitors: 30 from 30 nations

Medalists
| gold medal | David Taylor | United States |
| silver medal | Hassan Yazdani | Iran |
| bronze medal | Boris Makoev | Slovakia |
| bronze medal | Azamat Dauletbekov | Kazakhstan |

The men's freestyle 86 kilograms is a competition featured at the 2022 World Wrestling Championships, and was held in Belgrade, Serbia on 15 and 16 September 2022.

This freestyle wrestling competition consists of a single-elimination tournament, with a repechage used to determine the winner of two bronze medals. The two finalists face off for gold and silver medals. Each wrestler who loses to one of the two finalists moves into the repechage, culminating in a pair of bronze medal matches featuring the semifinal losers each facing the remaining repechage opponent from their half of the bracket.

== Results ==
Legend

- F — Won by fall

=== Final ===
| Final |
| Hassan Yazdani (IRI) | 1 |
| David Taylor (USA) | 7 |

=== Top half ===
Round of 32
Byambasürengiin Bat-Erdene (MGL) | 0
Ivan Ichizli (MDA) | 7
Noel Torres (MEX) | 5
Akhmed Magamaev (BUL) | 6
Sebastian Jezierzański (POL) | 16
Fatih Erdin (TUR) | 6
Boris Makoev (SVK) | 8
Alex Moore (CAN) | 3
Benjamin Greil (AUT) | 9
Patrik Püspöki (HUN) | 2
Tarzan Maisuradze (GEO) | 4
Sanjeet Kundu (IND) | 4
Khasan Zakariiev (UKR) | 4
Abubakr Abakarov (AZE) | 5

Round of 16
Hassan Yazdani (IRI) | 10
Ivan Ichizli (MDA) | 0
Akhmed Magamaev (BUL) | 1
Sebastian Jezierzański (POL) | 1
Boris Makoev (SVK) | 4
Benjamin Greil (AUT) | 0
Tarzan Maisuradze (GEO) | 3
Abubakr Abakarov (AZE) | 1

Quarterfinals
Hassan Yazdani (IRI) | 11
Sebastian Jezierzański (POL) | 0
Boris Makoev (SVK) | 6
Tarzan Maisuradze (GEO) | 5

Semifinals
Hassan Yazdani (IRI) | 10
Boris Makoev (SVK) | 0

=== Bottom half ===
Round of 32
Myles Amine (SMR) | 5
Lin Zushen (CHN) | 3
Ivars Samušonoks (LAT) | 15
Döwletmyrat Orazgylyjow (TKM) | 10
Kim Gwan-uk (KOR) | 0
Taimuraz Friev (ESP) | 4
Yurieski Torreblanca (CUB) | 1
Azamat Dauletbekov (KAZ) | 2
Ethan Ramos (PUR) | 10^{F}
Rakhim Magamadov (FRA) | 12
Bobur Islomov (UZB) | 3
Shota Shirai (JPN) | 4
Aron Caneva (ITA) | 4
Lars Schäfle (GER) | 1

Round of 16
Myles Amine (SMR) | 4
Ivars Samušonoks (LAT) | 0
Taimuraz Friev (ESP) | 2
Azamat Dauletbekov (KAZ) | 4
Ethan Ramos (PUR) | 11
Shota Shirai (JPN) | 0
Aron Caneva (ITA) | 0
David Taylor (USA) | 10

Quarterfinals
Myles Amine (SMR) | 1
Azamat Dauletbekov (KAZ) | 9
Ethan Ramos (PUR) | 0
David Taylor (USA) | 11

Semifinals
Azamat Dauletbekov (KAZ) | 0
David Taylor (USA) | 12

=== Repechage ===
Repechage round 2
Ivan Ichizli (MDA) | 0
Sebastian Jezierzański (POL) | 4
Aron Caneva (ITA) | 0
Ethan Ramos (PUR) | 10

Bronze medals
Sebastian Jezierzański (POL) | 1
Boris Makoev (SVK) | 3
Ethan Ramos (PUR) | 0
Azamat Dauletbekov (KAZ) | 10

== Final standing ==
| Rank | Athlete |
|---|---|
| 1st place, gold medalist(s) | David Taylor (USA) |
| 2nd place, silver medalist(s) | Hassan Yazdani (IRI) |
| 3rd place, bronze medalist(s) | Boris Makoev (SVK) |
| 3rd place, bronze medalist(s) | Azamat Dauletbekov (KAZ) |
| 5 | Sebastian Jezierzański (POL) |
| 5 | Ethan Ramos (PUR) |
| 7 | Tarzan Maisuradze (GEO) |
| 8 | Myles Amine (SMR) |
| 9 | Akhmed Magamaev (BUL) |
| 10 | Taimuraz Friev (ESP) |
| 11 | Abubakr Abakarov (AZE) |
| 12 | Ivars Samušonoks (LAT) |
| 13 | Benjamin Greil (AUT) |
| 14 | Ivan Ichizli (MDA) |
| 15 | Shota Shirai (JPN) |
| 16 | Aron Caneva (ITA) |
| 17 | Döwletmyrat Orazgylyjow (TKM) |
| 18 | Fatih Erdin (TUR) |
| 19 | Noel Torres (MEX) |
| 20 | Sanjeet Kundu (IND) |
| 21 | Khasan Zakariiev (UKR) |
| 22 | Bobur Islomov (UZB) |
| 23 | Lin Zushen (CHN) |
| 24 | Alex Moore (CAN) |
| 25 | Patrik Püspöki (HUN) |
| 26 | Yurieski Torreblanca (CUB) |
| 27 | Lars Schäfle (GER) |
| 28 | Rakhim Magamadov (FRA) |
| 29 | Kim Gwan-uk (KOR) |
| 30 | Byambasürengiin Bat-Erdene (MGL) |
