= Deepak Punia =

Deepak Punia may refer to:

- Deepak Punia (cricketer)
- Deepak Punia (wrestler)
