= Wrestling at the 2024 Summer Olympics – Men's freestyle 86 kg =

Men's freestyle 86 kg at the Games of the XXXIII Olympiad
- Venue: Grand Palais Éphémère
- Date: 8–9 August 2024
- Competitors: 16 from 16 nations

Medalists
1st place, gold medalist(s)		Magomed Ramazanov	Bulgaria
2nd place, silver medalist(s)		Hassan Yazdani	Iran
3rd place, bronze medalist(s)		Aaron Brooks	United States
3rd place, bronze medalist(s)		Dauren Kurugliev	Greece

Men's freestyle 86 kilograms competition at the 2024 Summer Olympics in Paris, France, took place on 8–9 August 2024 at the Grand Palais Éphémère in Champ de Mars.

== Background ==
This is the 25th appearance of men's freestyle middleweight category, debut in 1908, and it has appeared in every games since then except 1912.

- 1908: 73kg
- 1920: 69kg
- 1924-1960: 79kg
- 1964-1968: 87kg
- 1972-1996: 82kg
- 2000: 85kg
- 2004-2012: 84kg
- 2016-current: 86kg

Magomed Ramazanov won the event by beating Hassan Yazdani in the final, Aaron Brooks and Dauren Kurugliev won the bronze medals with Kurugliev going through repechage.

== Format ==
This freestyle wrestling competition consists of a single-elimination tournament, with a repechage used to determine the winner of two bronze medals. The two finalists face off for gold and silver medals. Each wrestler who loses to one of the two finalists moves into the repechage, culminating in a pair of bronze medal matches featuring the semifinal losers each facing the remaining repechage opponent from their half of the bracket.

== Rules ==
A typical bout consists of two halves of three minutes each separated by a 30-second break. The two competitors compete on a mat, which is nine meters in diameter. Wrestlers try to score points by executing various legal maneuvers. Points ranging from one to five are awarded by the mat referee depending on the degree of difficulty of the maneuvers. Points are also awarded to the opponent in case of infractions such as illegal holds, passivity etc. A wrestler is automatically disqualified if three cautions are awarded during a bout. Forcing an opponent's shoulders to the mat results in an instant victory by fall.

During the course of a match, if a wrestler builds a 10-point advantage over the opponent, the bout is stopped and the leader is declared as the winner by technical superiority. The total scores are totaled at the end of the stipulated six-minute period, and the wrestler with the maximum points wins. In case of a tie, the wrestler who has scored the last point is declared the winner. A competitor might also be declared a winner if the opponent does not turn up or is medically unfit to compete.

== Qualification ==
Sixteen quota places were available with each nation restricted to a maximum of one spot. Five quota places were awarded at the 2023 World Wrestling Championships, which took place from the 16th to 24th of September in Belgrade, Serbia. The finalists of each category in the four continental qualification tournaments (Asia, Europe, the Americas, and the joint Africa & Oceania) were awarded quota places. The remainder of the total quota was allocated at the 2024 World Wrestling Olympic Qualification Tournament, offering a minimum of three quota places.

== Schedule ==
All times are Central European Time (UTC+02:00)

Date	Time	Event
8 August 2024	11:30	Qualification rounds
8 August 2024	18:15	Semifinals
9 August 2024	11:00	Repechage
9 August 2024	19:30	Finals

== Results ==
Sixteen athletes qualified for the competition.

Legend

- F — Won by fall

=== Main bracket ===
Round of 16
Azamat Dauletbekov (KAZ)	3
Aaron Brooks (USA)	4
Fateh Benferdjallah (ALG)	0
Hayato Ishiguro (JPN)	11
Magomed Ramazanov (BUL)	12
Alex Moore (CAN)	2
Vladimeri Gamkrelidze (GEO)	1
Javrail Shapiev (UZB)	5
Myles Amine (SMR)	7
Vasyl Mykhailov (UKR)	4
Osman Nurmagomedov (AZE)	11
Byambasürengiin Bat-Erdene (MGL)	2
Dauren Kurugliev (GRE)	11
Ethan Ramos (PUR)	0
Jayden Lawrence (AUS)	0
Hassan Yazdani (IRI)	10

Quarterfinals
Aaron Brooks (USA)	11
Hayato Ishiguro (JPN)	1
Magomed Ramazanov (BUL)	4^{F}
Javrail Shapiev (UZB)	1
Myles Amine (SMR)	16
Osman Nurmagomedov (AZE)	14
Dauren Kurugliev (GRE)	4
Hassan Yazdani (IRI)	9

Semifinals
Aaron Brooks (USA)	3
Magomed Ramazanov (BUL)	4
Myles Amine (SMR)	1
Hassan Yazdani (IRI)	7

Final
Magomed Ramazanov (BUL)	7
Hassan Yazdani (IRI)	1

=== Repechage ===
Repechage
Alex Moore (CAN)	1
Javrail Shapiev (UZB)	6
Jayden Lawrence (AUS)	0
Dauren Kurugliev (GRE)	10

Bronze medal matches
Javrail Shapiev (UZB)	0
Aaron Brooks (USA)	5
Dauren Kurugliev (GRE)	5
Myles Amine (SMR)	4

== Final standing ==
Rank	Athlete
1st place, gold medalist(s)	Magomed Ramazanov (BUL)
2nd place, silver medalist(s)	Hassan Yazdani (IRI)
3rd place, bronze medalist(s)	Aaron Brooks (USA)
3rd place, bronze medalist(s)	Dauren Kurugliev (GRE)
5	Javrail Shapiev (UZB)
5	Myles Amine (SMR)
7	Hayato Ishiguro (JPN)
8	Osman Nurmagomedov (AZE)
9	Alex Moore (CAN)
10	Vasyl Mykhailov (UKR)
11	Azamat Dauletbekov (KAZ)
12	Byambasürengiin Bat-Erdene (MGL)
13	Vladimeri Gamkrelidze (GEO)
14	Fateh Benferdjallah (ALG)
15	Ethan Ramos (PUR)
16	Jayden Lawrence (AUS)
