= Alex Moore (wrestler) =

Canadian freestyle wrestler

Personal information
- Full name: Alexander Robert Moore
- Born: August 18, 1997 (age 28) Montreal, Quebec, Canada
- Height: 178 cm (5 ft 10 in)
- Weight: 86 kg (190 lb)

Sport
- Country: Canada
- Sport: Amateur wrestling
- Event: Freestyle
Medal record
Men's freestyle wrestling
Representing Canada
Commonwealth Games
Bronze medal – third place	2022 Birmingham	86 kg
Pan American Championships
Silver medal – second place	2023 Buenos Aires	86 Kg
Bronze medal – third place	2019 Buenos Aires	86 Kg
Pan American Junior Championships
Gold medal – first place	2017 Lima	84 Kg
Gold medal – first place	2016 Barinas	74 Kg

Alexander Robert Moore (born August 18, 1997) is a Canadian freestyle wrestler competing in the 86 kg freestyle event.

== Personal life ==
Moore grew up with the sport of wrestling and has been involved with it from a young age. Moore attended Selwyn House School, where his father was the wrestling coach; Vanier College; and Concordia University in Montreal.

== Career ==
=== Junior ===
Moore first represented Canada at the 2014 Summer Youth Olympics in Nanjing, China, where he finished in 6th place in the 63 kg freestyle event. Moore followed this up with back to back gold medals at the Pan American Junior Championships in 2016 and 2017.

=== Senior ===
Moore's first senior competition came at the 2018 Commonwealth Games in the Gold Coast, Australia, where Moore finished in fifth place in the 86 event. Moore would also represent Canada at the 2019 Pan American Games in Lima, Peru, where he would finish fifth again in the 86 event.

In 2021, Moore won a wrestle-off to represent Canada at the final Olympic qualifier. In June 2022, Moore was named to Canada's 2022 Commonwealth Games team.

He competed in the 86 kg event at the 2022 World Wrestling Championships held in Belgrade, Serbia.

In 2024, at the Pan American Wrestling Olympic Qualification Tournament held in Acapulco, Mexico, he earned a quota place for Canada for the 2024 Summer Olympics held in Paris, France. He competed in the men's freestyle 86 kg event at the Olympics.
