= Azamat Dauletbekov =

Kazakh freestyle wrestler

Personal information
- Native name: Азамат Дәулетбеков
- Born: 15 March 1994 (age 32) Kazakhstan
- Height: 178 cm (5 ft 10 in)

Sport
- Country: Kazakhstan
- Sport: Amateur wrestling
- Weight class: 86 kg
- Event: Freestyle

Achievements and titles
- World finals: (bronze) (2022, 2023)
- Regional finals: (gold) (2022, 2023, 2024)
Medal record
Men's freestyle wrestling
Representing Kazakhstan
World Championships
Bronze medal – third place	2022 Belgrade	86 kg
Bronze medal – third place	2023 Belgrade	86 kg
Asian Championships
Gold medal – first place	2022 Ulaanbaatar	86 kg
Gold medal – first place	2023 Astana	86 kg
Gold medal – first place	2024 Bishkek	86 kg
Silver medal – second place	2017 New Delhi	86 kg
Bronze medal – third place	2018 Bishkek	86 kg
Bronze medal – third place	2025 Amman	92 kg
Bronze medal – third place	2026 Bishkek	92 kg
Olympic Qualification Tournament
Bronze medal – third place	2021 Almaty	86 kg
Yasar Dogu Tournament
Silver medal – second place	2025 Kocaeli	86 kg
Grand Prix
Gold medal – first place	2022 Khasavyurt	86 kg
Gold medal – first place	2022 Tunis	86 kg
Gold medal – first place	2022 Taraz	86 kg
Gold medal – first place	2024 Taraz	92 kg
Silver medal – second place	2019 Taraz	86 kg
Silver medal – second place	2019 Sassari	86 kg
Silver medal – second place	2026 Ulaanbaatar	92 kg
Bronze medal – third place	2023 Bishkek	86 kg
Bronze medal – third place	2024 Zagreb	86 kg
Bronze medal – third place	2018 Taraz	86 kg
Bronze medal – third place	2026 Tirana	92 kg
World U23 Championships
Silver medal – second place	2017 Bydgoszcz	86 kg
World Junior Championships
Silver medal – second place	2014 Zagreb	84 kg
Asian Junior Championships
Silver medal – second place	2013 Phuket	84 kg
World Cadets Championships
Bronze medal – third place	2011 Szombathely	69 kg
Asian Cadets Championships
Silver medal – second place	2011 Bangkok	69 kg
Representing All-World Team
World Cup
Bronze medal – third place	2022 Coralville	Team

Azamat Dauletbekov (born 15 March 1994) is a Kazakh freestyle wrestler. He is a two-time bronze medalist in the men's 86 kg event at the World Wrestling Championships (2022 and 2023). He is also a six-time medalist, including three gold medals, at the Asian Wrestling Championships. He represented Kazakhstan at the 2024 Summer Olympics in Paris, France.

== Career ==
Dauletbekov won the silver medal in his event at the 2017 Asian Wrestling Championships held in New Delhi, India. In 2018, he won one of the bronze medals in his event at the Asian Wrestling Championships held in Bishkek, Kyrgyzstan. He lost his bronze medal match at the 2020 Asian Wrestling Championships held in New Delhi, India.

Dauletbekov competed at the 2021 Asian Wrestling Olympic Qualification Tournament held in Almaty, Kazakhstan hoping to qualify for the 2020 Summer Olympics in Tokyo, Japan. He did not qualify at this tournament and he also failed to qualify for the Olympics at the World Olympic Qualification Tournament held in Sofia, Bulgaria.

Dauletbekov won the gold medal in his event at the 2022 Asian Wrestling Championships held in Ulaanbaatar, Mongolia. He also won the gold medal in his event at the 2022 Tunis Ranking Series event held in Tunis, Tunisia. He won one of the bronze medals in the men's 86 kg event at the 2022 World Wrestling Championships held in Belgrade, Serbia.

Dauletbekov won the gold medal in his event at the 2023 Asian Wrestling Championships held in Astana, Kazakhstan. He defeated Alireza Karimi of Iran in his gold medal match. He won one of the bronze medals in the men's 86 kg event at the 2023 World Wrestling Championships held in Belgrade, Serbia. As a result, Dauletbekov earned a quota place for Kazakhstan for the 2024 Summer Olympics in Paris, France.

In April 2024, he won the gold medal in his event at the Asian Wrestling Championships held in Bishkek, Kyrgyzstan. He defeated Javrail Shapiev of Uzbekistan in his gold medal match. In August 2024, Dauletbekov competed in the men's freestyle 86 kg event at the Summer Olympics in Paris, France. He was eliminated in his first match by eventual bronze medalist Aaron Brooks of the United States.

== Achievements ==
Year	Tournament	Location	Result	Event
2017	Asian Championships	New Delhi, India	2nd	Freestyle 86 kg
2018	Asian Championships	Bishkek, Kyrgyzstan	3rd	Freestyle 86 kg
2022	Asian Championships	Ulaanbaatar, Mongolia	1st	Freestyle 86 kg
2022	World Championships	Belgrade, Serbia	3rd	Freestyle 86 kg
2023	Asian Championships	Astana, Kazakhstan	1st	Freestyle 86 kg
2023	World Championships	Belgrade, Serbia	3rd	Freestyle 86 kg
2024	Asian Championships	Bishkek, Kyrgyzstan	1st	Freestyle 86 kg
2025	Asian Championships	Amman, Jordan	3rd	Freestyle 92 kg
