= Myles Amine =

Sammarinese-American freestyle wrestler (born 1996)

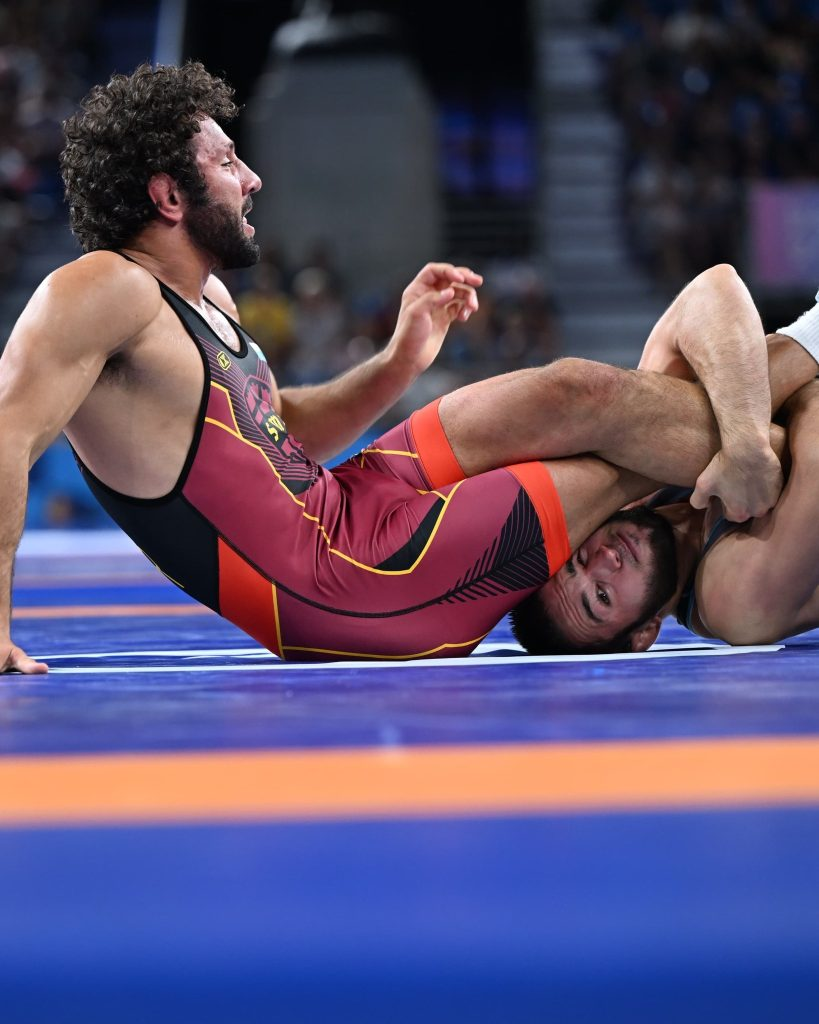
- at the 2024 Summer Olympics

Personal information
- Full name: Myles Nazem Amine
- Nationality: American, Sammarinese
- Born: 14 December 1996 (age 29) Howell, Michigan, U.S.
- Height: 1.78 m (5 ft 10 in)
- Weight: 86 kg (190 lb)

Sport
- Country: San Marino
- Sport: Wrestling
- Weight class: 86 kg
- Events: Freestyle and Folkstyle
- College team: Michigan
- Club: Cliff Keen Wrestling Club
- Coached by: Sergey Beloglazov

Achievements and titles
- Olympic finals: (bronze) (2020)
- World finals: (bronze) (2023)
- Regional finals: (gold) (2022)
Medal record
Men's freestyle wrestling
Representing San Marino
Olympic Games
Bronze medal – third place	2020 Tokyo	86 kg
World Championships
Bronze medal – third place	2023 Belgrade	86 kg
European Championships
Gold medal – first place	2022 Budapest	86 kg
Silver medal – second place	2020 Rome	86 kg
Silver medal – second place	2023 Zagreb	86 kg
Silver medal – second place	2024 Bucharest	86 kg
Bronze medal – third place	2021 Warsaw	86 kg
European Games
Bronze medal – third place	2019 Minsk	86 kg
Mediterranean Games
Gold medal – first place	2022 Oran	86 kg
Grand Prix
Gold medal – first place	2023 Budapest	86 kg
Bronze medal – third place	2021 Warsaw	86 kg
Collegiate Wrestling
Representing the Michigan Wolverines
NCAA Division I Championships
Silver medal – second place	2022 Detroit	184 lb
Bronze medal – third place	2018 Cleveland	174 lb
Bronze medal – third place	2019 Pittsburgh	174 lb
Bronze medal – third place	2021 St. Louis	197 lb
Big Ten Championships
Gold medal – first place	2021 State College	197 lb
Gold medal – first place	2022 Lincoln	184 lb
Silver medal – second place	2018 East Lansing	174 lb
Silver medal – second place	2019 Minneapolis	174 lb
Bronze medal – third place	2017 Bloomington	174 lb

Myles Nazem Amine (born 14 December 1996) is an American-Sammarinese freestyle and folkstyle wrestler who competes at 86 kilograms. Born in the United States, he represents San Marino internationally. He is a graduate of Detroit Catholic Central High School.

== Collegiate career ==
In folkstyle, Amine is a five-time NCAA Division I All-American and two-time Big Ten Conference Champion (four-time finalist) for the Michigan Wolverines. Amine was the top-seeded 197-pound NCAA wrestler heading into the 2021 national championships, but finished third. His paternal grandfather Nazem Amine was also a freestyle wrestler who competed for Lebanon at the 1960 Summer Olympics.

== Freestyle career ==
In freestyle, Amine won bronze for San Marino at the 2020 Summer Olympics and claimed medals at the European Games and the European Championships.

He won the gold medal in the 86 kg event at the 2022 Mediterranean Games held in Oran, Algeria. He competed in the 86 kg event at the 2022 World Wrestling Championships held in Belgrade, Serbia.

He won one of the bronze medals in the men's 86 kg event at the 2023 World Wrestling Championships held in Belgrade, Serbia. As a result, he earned a quota place for San Marino for the 2024 Summer Olympics in Paris, France.

In February 2024, he won the silver medal in the men's 86 kg event at the 2024 European Wrestling Championships held in Bucharest, Romania. In August 2024, he lost his bronze medal match in the men's freestyle 86 kg event at the Summer Olympics in Paris, France. He was also a flag bearer for San Marino during the closing ceremony of the Olympics.

== Personal life ==
He represents San Marino via citizenship passed through his maternal great-grandparents, Germano and Pierina Mularoni.

Olympic Games
Preceded by Arianna Perilli	Flagbearer for San Marino (with Arianna Valloni); Tokyo 2020	Succeeded by Incumbent
