= Kim Gwan-uk =

South Korean freestyle wrestler

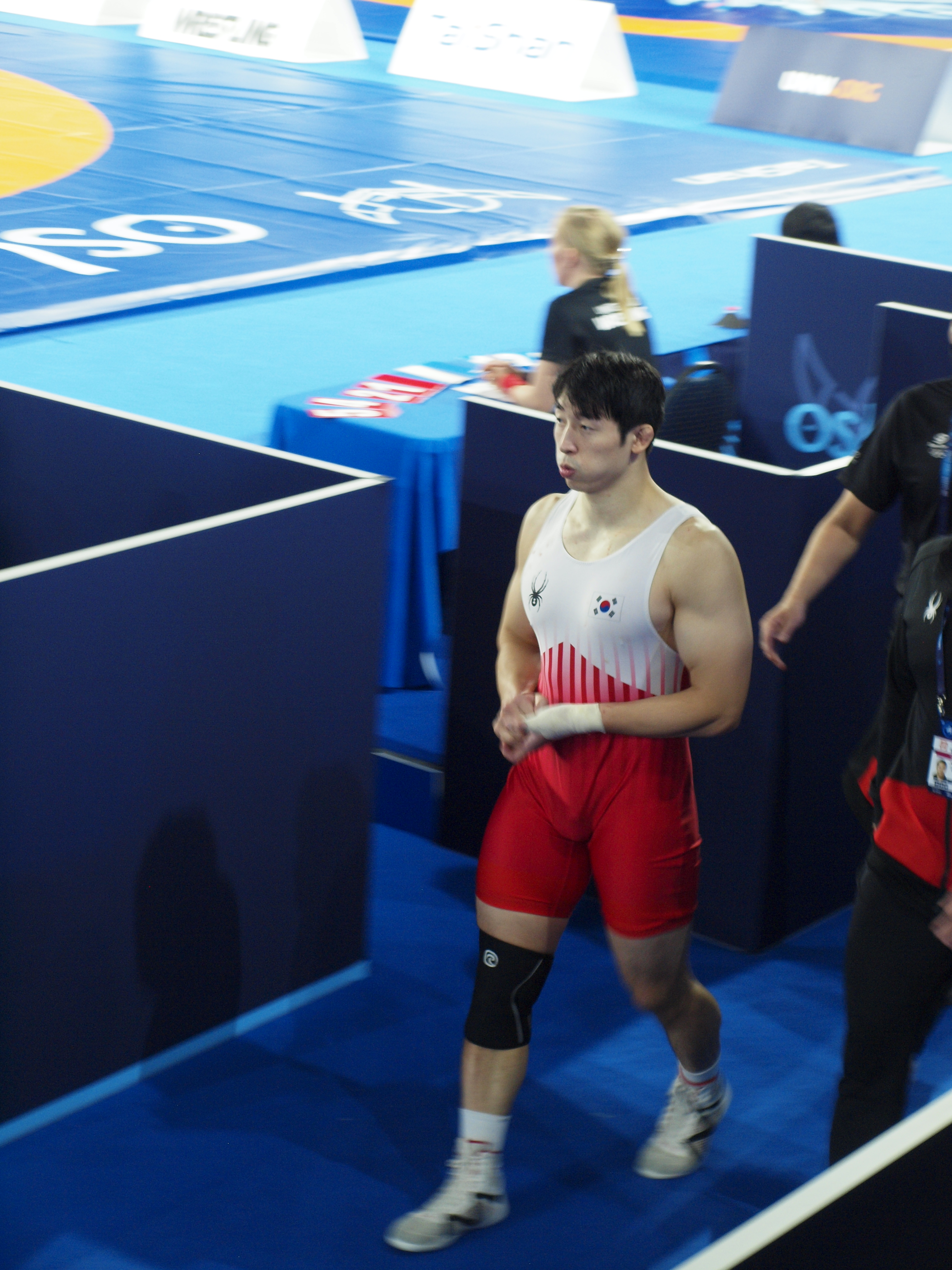

Personal information
- Nationality: South Korean

Sport
- Country: South Korea
- Sport: Freestyle wrestling
- Events: 86 kg, 125 kg
Medal record
Men's Freestyle Wrestling
Representing South Korea
Asian Games
Bronze medal – third place	2014 Incheon	86 kg
Asian Championships
Bronze medal – third place	2021 Almaty	86 kg

Kim Gwan-uk (Korean: 김관욱, born July 22, 1990) is a South Korean freestyle wrestler. He competed in the men's freestyle 86 kg event at the 2016 Summer Olympics, in which he was eliminated in the round of 16 by Reineris Salas.

He competed in the 86 kg event at the 2022 World Wrestling Championships held in Belgrade, Serbia.
