= Boris Makoev =

Slovak wrestler (born 1993)

Boris Makoev Борис Макоев
Personal information
- Native name: Борис Ахсарбекович Макоев
- Nationality: Slovakia
- Born: Boris Akhsarbekovic Makoev; January 22, 1993 (age 33) North Ossetia-Alania, Russia
- Height: 175 cm (5 ft 9 in)

Sport
- Country: Russia (until 2017); Slovakia (since 2017)
- Sport: Wrestling
- Weight class: 86 kg
- Event: Freestyle
- Club: ZK 1904 Košice
- Coached by: Akhsarbek Makoev,Kazbek Dedegkaev

Achievements and titles
- World finals: (silver) (2017) (bronze) (2022)
- Regional finals: (silver) (2024) (bronze) (2020)
Medal record
Men's freestyle wrestling
Representing Slovakia
World Championships
Silver medal – second place	2017 Paris	86 kg
Bronze medal – third place	2022 Belgrade	86 kg
European Championships
Silver medal – second place	2024 Bucharest	92 kg
Bronze medal – third place	2020 Rome	86 kg
Olympic Qualification Tournament
Silver medal – second place	2021 Sofia	86 kg
Bronze medal – third place	2021 Budapest	86 kg
Grand Prix
Silver medal – second place	2022 Almaty	86 kg
Bronze medal – third place	2022 Rome	86 kg
Yasar Dogu Tournament
Bronze medal – third place	2018 Istanbul	86 kg
Dan Kolov & Nikola Petrov Tournament
Bronze medal – third place	2019 Russe	86 kg

Boris Akhsarbekovic Makoev (Russian: Борис Ахсарбекович Макоев; born January 22, 1993, in Ossetia) is a Russian naturalized Slovak freestyle wrestler Ossetian ethnicity who competes at 86 kilograms. In March 2021, he competed at the European Qualification Tournament in Budapest, Hungary and qualified for the 2020 Summer Olympics in Tokyo, Japan.

In 2022, Makoev won one of the bronze medals in his event at the Matteo Pellicone Ranking Series 2022 held in Rome, Italy. He won one of the bronze medals in the men's 86 kg event at the 2022 World Wrestling Championships held in Belgrade, Serbia.

Makoev won the silver medal in the men's 92 kg event at the 2024 European Wrestling Championships held in Bucharest, Romania. He competed at the 2024 European Wrestling Olympic Qualification Tournament in Baku, Azerbaijan hoping to qualify for the 2024 Summer Olympics in Paris, France. He was eliminated in his second match and he did not qualify for the Olympics.
