= Javrail Shapiev =

Uzbek wrestler (born 1997)

Personal information
- Full name: Javrail Nurmagomedovich Shapiev
- Born: 20 April 1997 (age 29)
- Height: 183 cm (6 ft 0 in)

Sport
- Country: Uzbekistan
- Sport: Amateur wrestling
- Weight class: 86 kg
- Event: Freestyle
- Coached by: Magomed Magomedov

Achievements and titles
- Olympic finals: 5th (2020)
- World finals: 5th (2023)
- Regional finals: (bronze) (2023)
Medal record
Men's freestyle wrestling
Representing Uzbekistan
Asian Games
Bronze medal – third place	2022 Hangzhou	86 kg
Asian Championships
Silver medal – second place	2024 Bishkek	86 kg
Grand Prix
Bronze medal – third place	2023 Bishkek	86 kg
Asian Cadets Championship
Bronze medal – third place	2017 Taichung	84 kg

Javrail Shapiev (born 20 April 1997) is an Uzbek wrestler. He competed in the 2020 Summer Olympics. He won a bronze medal at the 2022 Asian Games.

He won the silver medal in his event at the 2024 Asian Wrestling Championships held in Bishkek, Kyrgyzstan. He lost his bronze medal match in the men's freestyle 86 kg event at the 2024 Summer Olympics in Paris, France.
