= Lin Zushen =

Chinese wrestler

Personal information
- Born: 1 March 1994 (age 32) Baise, Guangxi, China

Sport
- Country: China
- Sport: Amateur wrestling
- Event: Freestyle

Lin Zushen (Chinese: 林 祖沈, born 1 March 1994) is a Chinese wrestler. He competed in the 2020 Summer Olympics.
