= 2026 Muhamet Malo Tournament – Men's Greco-Roman =

The men's Greco-Roman competitions at the 2026 Muhamet Malo Tournament were held in Tirana, Albania between 27 February and 1 March 2026.

== Men's Greco-Roman ==
Legend

- F — Won by fall
- R — Retired
- WO — Won by walkover

=== Men's Greco-Roman 55 kg ===
1 March

Round of 16
Rashad Mammadov (AZE)	5
Ulan Muratbek Uulu (KGZ)	1
Billy Sullivan (USA)	4
Vishvajit More (IND)	11^{F}

Quarterfinals
Arsen Zhuma (KAZ)	3
Rashad Mammadov (AZE)	9
Andi Muça (ALB)	0
Lalit Sehrawat (IND)	8
Marlan Mukashev (KAZ)	6
Emin Sefershaev (UWW)	7
Vishvajit More (IND)	10
Rasul Joraýew (TKM)	3

Semifinals
Rashad Mammadov (AZE)	6
Lalit Sehrawat (IND)	5
Emin Sefershaev (UWW)	10
Vishvajit More (IND)	1

Final
Rashad Mammadov (AZE)	1
Emin Sefershaev (UWW)	3

Repechage round 1
Ulan Muratbek Uulu (KGZ)	5
Arsen Zhuma (KAZ)	14

Bronze medal match
Arsen Zhuma (KAZ)	0
Lalit Sehrawat (IND)	9^{F}
Marlan Mukashev (KAZ)	12
Vishvajit More (IND)	12

=== Men's Greco-Roman 60 kg ===
1 March

Final
Nihad Guluzade (AZE)	1
Nihat Mammadli (AZE)	1

Qualification
Dalton Roberts (USA)	3
Kurmanbek Zhaparov (KGZ)	2

Round of 16
Sadyk Lalaev (UWW)	9
Udit Patel (IND)	0
Dalton Roberts (USA)	6
Iskhar Kurbayev (KAZ)	1
Nihad Guluzade (AZE)	8
Akzhol Tuyakov (KAZ)	2
Marat Garipov (BRA)	0
Azatjan Açilow (TKM)	8

Quarterfinals
Sadyk Lalaev (UWW)	9
Dalton Roberts (USA)	0
Nihad Guluzade (AZE)	10
Azatjan Açilow (TKM)	0

Semifinals
Sadyk Lalaev (UWW)	0
Nihad Guluzade (AZE)	8

Qualification

Round of 16
Nihat Mammadli (AZE)	8
Maxwell Black (USA)	0
Yerbol Kamaliyev (KAZ)	8
Vakhtang Lolua (GEO)	7
Bajram Sina (ALB)	0
Suner Konunov (UWW)	8
Suraj Vashisht (IND)	3
Dimitri Khachidze (GEO)	1

Quarterfinals
Nihat Mammadli (AZE)	6
Yerbol Kamaliyev (KAZ)	0
Suner Konunov (UWW)	9
Suraj Vashisht (IND)	0

Semifinals
Nihat Mammadli (AZE)	3
Suner Konunov (UWW)	1

Repechage round 2
Akzhol Tuyakov (KAZ)	3
Azatjan Açilow (TKM)	4
Maxwell Black (USA)	2
Yerbol Kamaliyev (KAZ)	1

Bronze medal match
Azatjan Açilow (TKM)	1
Sadyk Lalaev (UWW)	7
Maxwell Black (USA)	1
Suner Konunov (UWW)	1

=== Men's Greco-Roman 63 kg ===
28 February

Final
Ziya Babashov (AZE)	1
Sakit Guliyev (AZE)	1

Qualification
Ergi Uku (ALB)	0
Aftandil Taalaibek Uulu (KGZ)	9

Round of 16
Saurabh (IND)	2
Yerkebulan Ardakov (KAZ)	13
Aftandil Taalaibek Uulu (KGZ)	1
Yernur Fidakhmetov (KAZ)	7
Murad Mammadov (AZE)	3
Ali Hajivand (IRI)	8
Ziya Babashov (AZE)	8
Mikel Troplini (ALB)	0

Quarterfinals
Yerkebulan Ardakov (KAZ)	0
Yernur Fidakhmetov (KAZ)	9
Ali Hajivand (IRI)	1
Ziya Babashov (AZE)	4

Semifinals
Yernur Fidakhmetov (KAZ)	3
Ziya Babashov (AZE)	7

Qualification

Round of 16
Aref Mohammadi (QAT)	3
Pridon Abuladze (GEO)	3
Igor Punchenko (UWW)	1
Morten Thoresen (NOR)	4
Sakit Guliyev (AZE)	9
Ildar Hafizov (USA)	0
Bakytzhan Kabdyl (KAZ)	6^{F}
Chetan Sharma (IND)	2

Quarterfinals
Pridon Abuladze (GEO)	6
Morten Thoresen (NOR)	9
Sakit Guliyev (AZE)	7
Bakytzhan Kabdyl (KAZ)	1

Semifinals
Morten Thoresen (NOR)	0
Sakit Guliyev (AZE)	9

Repechage round 2
Mikel Troplini (ALB)	0
Ali Hajivand (IRI)	9^{F}
Ildar Hafizov (USA)	9
Bakytzhan Kabdyl (KAZ)	12

Bronze medal match
Ali Hajivand (IRI)	3
Yernur Fidakhmetov (KAZ)	6
Bakytzhan Kabdyl (KAZ)	1
Morten Thoresen (NOR)	2

=== Men's Greco-Roman 67 kg ===
28 February

Final
Meirzhan Shermakhanbet (KAZ)	5
Diego Chkhikvadze (GEO)	1

Qualification
Niklas Öhlén (SWE)	1
Baiaman Karimov (KGZ)	1

Round of 16
Witalis Lazovski (GER)
Joni Khetsuriani (GEO)	WO
Niklas Öhlén (SWE)	10
Gjete Prenga (ALB)	2
Hleb Makaranka (UWW)	1
Mahammad Shukurzade (AZE)	1
Andrés Montaño (ECU)	0
Meirzhan Shermakhanbet (KAZ)	9

Quarterfinals
Joni Khetsuriani (GEO)	3
Niklas Öhlén (SWE)	2
Mahammad Shukurzade (AZE)	0
Meirzhan Shermakhanbet (KAZ)	4^{F}

Semifinals
Joni Khetsuriani (GEO)	1
Meirzhan Shermakhanbet (KAZ)	3

Qualification
Otto Black (USA)	9
Ankit Gulia (IND)	0
Tsuchika Shimoyamada (AUS)	9
Sebastian Nađ (SRB)	5

Round of 16
Kakabaý Kakabaýew (TKM)	3
Karanjit Singh (IND)	3
Otto Black (USA)	4
Yerzhet Zharlykassyn (KAZ)	1
Alston Nutter (USA)	13
Tsuchika Shimoyamada (AUS)	4
Diego Chkhikvadze (GEO)	9
Erzu Zakriev (UWW)	1

Quarterfinals
Karanjit Singh (IND)	0
Otto Black (USA)	8
Alston Nutter (USA)	1
Diego Chkhikvadze (GEO)	10

Semifinals
Otto Black (USA)	4
Diego Chkhikvadze (GEO)	4

Repechage round 2
Andrés Montaño (ECU)	3
Mahammad Shukurzade (AZE)	12
Erzu Zakriev (UWW)	9
Alston Nutter (USA)	0

Bronze medal match
Mahammad Shukurzade (AZE)	1
Joni Khetsuriani (GEO)	2
Erzu Zakriev (UWW)	8
Otto Black (USA)	0

=== Men's Greco-Roman 72 kg ===
1 March

Final
Hojat Rezaei (IRI)	3
Mohammad Javad Rezaei (IRI)	7

Qualification
Magomed Barakhoev (UWW)	6
Amantur Ismailov (KGZ)	7

Round of 16
Ruslan Nurullayev (AZE)	9
Sourav Rana (IND)	0
Amantur Ismailov (KGZ)	1
István Váncza (HUN)	2
Iuri Lomadze (GEO)	5
Benji Peak (USA)	1
Hojat Rezaei (IRI)	11
Didar Orazberdiýew (TKM)	0

Quarterfinals
Ruslan Nurullayev (AZE)	5
István Váncza (HUN)	1
Iuri Lomadze (GEO)	5
Hojat Rezaei (IRI)	8

Semifinals
Ruslan Nurullayev (AZE)	3
Hojat Rezaei (IRI)	7

Qualification

Round of 16
Kamil Akhmetvaleev (UWW)	1
Razzak Beishekeev (KGZ)	7
Nikolay Khapko (KAZ)	9
Xhord Gjoni (ALB)	0
Kamil Czarnecki (POL)	3
Almatbek Amanbek (KAZ)	4
Daniyar Kalenov (KAZ)	0
Mohammad Javad Rezaei (IRI)	7

Quarterfinals
Razzak Beishekeev (KGZ)	10
Nikolay Khapko (KAZ)	3
Almatbek Amanbek (KAZ)	2
Mohammad Javad Rezaei (IRI)	3

Semifinals
Razzak Beishekeev (KGZ)	1
Mohammad Javad Rezaei (IRI)	5

Repechage round 2
Didar Orazberdiýew (TKM)	0
Iuri Lomadze (GEO)	9
Olzhas Syrlybay (KAZ)	1
Almatbek Amanbek (KAZ)	1

Bronze medal match
Iuri Lomadze (GEO)	7
Ruslan Nurullayev (AZE)	4
Almatbek Amanbek (KAZ)	0
Razzak Beishekeev (KGZ)	3^{F}

=== Men's Greco-Roman 77 kg ===
27 February

Final
Sergey Stepanov (UWW)	4
Evgenii Baidusov (UWW)	0

Qualification
Britton Holmes (USA)	0
Kaharman Kissymetov (KAZ)	8
Ilgis Kanybekov (KGZ)	0
Zoltán Lévai (HUN)	2
Davud Mammadov (AZE)	WO
Merey Maulitkanov (KAZ)

Round of 16
Mateusz Bernatek (POL)	6
Konrad Kozłowski (POL)	1
Kaharman Kissymetov (KAZ)	1
Sergey Stepanov (UWW)	3
Amir Abdi (IRI)	3
Zoltán Lévai (HUN)	2
Davud Mammadov (AZE)	5
Aleksa Ilić (SRB)	5

Quarterfinals
Mateusz Bernatek (POL)	0
Sergey Stepanov (UWW)	7^{F}
Amir Abdi (IRI)	9
Aleksa Ilić (SRB)	0

Semifinals
Sergey Stepanov (UWW)	2
Amir Abdi (IRI)	2

Qualification
Aman Khokhar (IND)	2
Shuai Mamedau (UWW)	10
Imran Aliev (UWW)	7
Ramaz Zoidze (GEO)	8
Nishant Phogat (IND)	9^{F}
Klodjan Shehu (ALB)	0

Round of 16
Róbert Fritsch (HUN)	2
Shuai Mamedau (UWW)	0
Ramaz Zoidze (GEO)
Evgenii Baidusov (UWW)	WO
Samuel Bellscheidt (GER)	8
Nishant Phogat (IND)	0
Alexandrin Guțu (MDA)	2
Alireza Abdevali (IRI)	3

Quarterfinals
Róbert Fritsch (HUN)	4
Evgenii Baidusov (UWW)	4
Samuel Bellscheidt (GER)	1
Alireza Abdevali (IRI)	3

Semifinals
Evgenii Baidusov (UWW)	4
Alireza Abdevali (IRI)	1

Repechage round 2
Kaharman Kissymetov (KAZ)	1
Mateusz Bernatek (POL)	1
Ramaz Zoidze (GEO)
Róbert Fritsch (HUN)	WO

Bronze medal match
Kaharman Kissymetov (KAZ)	3
Amir Abdi (IRI)	4
Róbert Fritsch (HUN)	5
Alireza Abdevali (IRI)	3

=== Men's Greco-Roman 82 kg ===
1 March

Round of 16
Dias Kalen (KAZ)	3
Akzhol Makhmudov (KGZ)	4
Tunjay Vazirzade (AZE)	4
Almir Tolebayev (KAZ)	0
George Sikes (USA)	0
Prince (IND)	7
Iraklii Kalandiia (UWW)	1
Adlet Tiuliubaev (UWW)	11
Viktor Nemeš (SRB)	2
Mohammad Amin Hosseini (IRI)	5
Yryskeldi Maksatbek Uulu (KGZ)	2
Shahin Badaghi (QAT)	10
Marjan Kola (ALB)	1
Kamal Bey (USA)	5^{F}
Demeu Zhadrayev (KAZ)	3
Dmitrii Dzhioev (UWW)	1

Quarterfinals
Akzhol Makhmudov (KGZ)	2
Tunjay Vazirzade (AZE)	5
Prince (IND)	0
Adlet Tiuliubaev (UWW)	11
Mohammad Amin Hosseini (IRI)	7
Shahin Badaghi (QAT)	6
Kamal Bey (USA)	3
Demeu Zhadrayev (KAZ)	3

Semifinals
Tunjay Vazirzade (AZE)	1
Adlet Tiuliubaev (UWW)	6
Mohammad Amin Hosseini (IRI)	7
Kamal Bey (USA)	0

Final
Adlet Tiuliubaev (UWW)	2
Mohammad Amin Hosseini (IRI)	6

Repechage round 1
Iraklii Kalandiia (UWW)	10
Prince (IND)	1
Viktor Nemeš (SRB)	9
Shahin Badaghi (QAT)	1

Bronze medal match
Iraklii Kalandiia (UWW)	11^{F}
Tunjay Vazirzade (AZE)	1
Viktor Nemeš (SRB)	2
Kamal Bey (USA)	0

=== Men's Greco-Roman 87 kg ===
27 February

Final
Alan Ostaev (UWW)	12
Lasha Gobadze (GEO)	5

Qualification
Baurzhan Mussin (KAZ)	0
Sunil Kumar (IND)	2

Round of 16
István Takács (HUN)	6
Ihar Yarashevich (UWW)	0
Sunil Kumar (IND)	1
Shamil Ozhaev (KAZ)	7
Alan Ostaev (UWW)	9
Lachin Valiyev (AZE)	1
Asan Zhanyshov (KGZ)	5
Gela Bolkvadze (GEO)	2

Quarterfinals
István Takács (HUN)	4
Shamil Ozhaev (KAZ)	1
Alan Ostaev (UWW)	6
Asan Zhanyshov (KGZ)	1

Semifinals
István Takács (HUN)	0
Alan Ostaev (UWW)	8

Qualification
Islam Yevloyev (KAZ)
Islam Abbasov (AZE)	WO
Milad Alirzaev (UWW)	1
Aleksandr Komarov (SRB)	1

Round of 16
Payton Jacobson (USA)	8^{F}
Adam Gardzioła (POL)	0
Islam Abbasov (AZE)	1
Islam Aliev (UWW)	3
Lasha Gobadze (GEO)	6
Milad Alirzaev (UWW)	6
Jamal Esmaeili (IRI)	9
Azat Salidinov (KGZ)	1

Quarterfinals
Payton Jacobson (USA)	1
Islam Aliev (UWW)	5
Lasha Gobadze (GEO)	3
Jamal Esmaeili (IRI)	1

Semifinals
Islam Aliev (UWW)	0
Lasha Gobadze (GEO)	10

Repechage round 2
Lachin Valiyev (AZE)	1
Asan Zhanyshov (KGZ)	3
Milad Alirzaev (UWW)	7
Jamal Esmaeili (IRI)	0

Bronze medal match
Asan Zhanyshov (KGZ)	4
István Takács (HUN)	8
Milad Alirzaev (UWW)	9
Islam Aliev (UWW)	0

=== Men's Greco-Roman 97 kg ===
1 March

Final
Kiryl Maskevich (UWW)
Artur Sargsian (UWW)	WO

Qualification
Gerard Kurniczak (POL)	1
Iussuf Matsiyev (KAZ)	3
Darius Kiefer (GER)	1
Giorgi Melia (GEO)	1
Artur Omarov (CZE)	8
Keith Miley (USA)	0

Round of 16
Adlan Amriev (UWW)	3
Alex Szőke (HUN)	5
Iussuf Matsiyev (KAZ)	1
Kiryl Maskevich (UWW)	5
Murad Ahmadiyev (AZE)	2
Giorgi Melia (GEO)	2
Artur Omarov (CZE)	2^{F}
Melis Aitbekov (KGZ)	1

Quarterfinals
Alex Szőke (HUN)	1
Kiryl Maskevich (UWW)	1
Giorgi Melia (GEO)	WO
Artur Omarov (CZE)

Semifinals
Kiryl Maskevich (UWW)	7
Giorgi Melia (GEO)	1

Qualification
Uroš Krstin (SRB)	3
Mathias Bak (DEN)	5
Nurassyl Amanaly (KAZ)	6^{F}
Vikrant Bhoriya (IND)	0
Artur Sargsian (UWW)	7
Mahammad Ahmadiyev (AZE)	2

Round of 16
Amir Reza Moradian (IRI)	4
Mathias Bak (DEN)	0
Nurassyl Amanaly (KAZ)	6
Raiymbek Tursyn (KAZ)	2
Michial Foy (USA)	0
Artur Sargsian (UWW)	8
Amanberdi Agamämmedow (TKM)	0
Uzur Dzhuzupbekov (KGZ)	9

Quarterfinals
Amir Reza Moradian (IRI)	5
Nurassyl Amanaly (KAZ)	2
Artur Sargsian (UWW)	9
Uzur Dzhuzupbekov (KGZ)	0

Semifinals
Amir Reza Moradian (IRI)	2
Artur Sargsian (UWW)	3

Repechage round 1
Mahammad Ahmadiyev (AZE)	6
Michial Foy (USA)	2

Repechage round 2
Iussuf Matsiyev (KAZ)	0
Alex Szőke (HUN)	2
Mahammad Ahmadiyev (AZE)	2
Uzur Dzhuzupbekov (KGZ)	8

Bronze medals
Alex Szőke (HUN)	WO
Giorgi Melia (GEO)
Uzur Dzhuzupbekov (KGZ)	4
Amir Reza Moradian (IRI)	2

=== Men's Greco-Roman 130 kg ===
1 March

Final
Konsta Mäenpää (FIN)	0
Marat Kamparov (UWW)	5

Qualification
Jokhar Uzarov (KAZ)	0
Dzmitry Zarubski (UWW)	4

Round of 16
Sulkhan Buidze (GEO)	2
Aden Attao (USA)	0
Dzmitry Zarubski (UWW)	3
Dáriusz Vitek (HUN)	1
Griseldi Kodra (ALB)	0
Hardeep Chhillar (IND)	9
Konsta Mäenpää (FIN)	2
Jello Krahmer (GER)	0

Quarterfinals
Sulkhan Buidze (GEO)	1
Dzmitry Zarubski (UWW)	1
Hardeep Chhillar (IND)	0
Konsta Mäenpää (FIN)	8

Semifinals
Dzmitry Zarubski (UWW)	0
Konsta Mäenpää (FIN)	8

Qualification

Round of 16
Beka Kandelaki (AZE)	7
Alimkhan Syzdykov (KAZ)	3
Ali Iliasov (UWW)	3
Sarkhan Mammadov (AZE)	1
Marat Kamparov (UWW)	3
Olzhas Syrlybay (KAZ)	1
Elias Kuosmanen (FIN)	9
Uttam Rana (IND)	0

Quarterfinals
Beka Kandelaki (AZE)	7
Ali Iliasov (UWW)	3
Marat Kamparov (UWW)	1
Elias Kuosmanen (FIN)	1

Semifinals
Beka Kandelaki (AZE)	1
Marat Kamparov (UWW)	1

Repechage round 2
Jello Krahmer (GER)	9
Hardeep Chhillar (IND)	0
Olzhas Syrlybay (KAZ)	1
Elias Kuosmanen (FIN)	3

Bronze medal match
Jello Krahmer (GER)	0
Dzmitry Zarubski (UWW)	7^{F}
Elias Kuosmanen (FIN)	3
Beka Kandelaki (AZE)	0

== See also ==
- 2026 Muhamet Malo Tournament – Women's freestyle
- 2026 Muhamet Malo Tournament
