= 2026 European Wrestling Championships – Men's Greco-Roman 97 kg =

Men's Greco-Roman 97 kg at the 2026 European Wrestling Championships
- Venue: Tirana Olympic Park
- Location: Tirana, Albania
- Dates: 21–22 April
- Competitors: 21 from 19 nations

Medalists
gold medal	Kiril Milov	Bulgaria
silver medal	Alex Szőke	Hungary
bronze medal	Artur Sargsyan
bronze medal	Vladlen Kozlyuk	Ukraine

The men's Greco-Roman 97 kilograms competition at the 2026 European Wrestling Championships was held from 21 to 22 April 2026 at the Tirana Olympic Park in Tirana, Albania.

== Results ==
Legend

- F — Won by fall

=== Final ===
Final
Kiril Milov (BUL)	3
Alex Szőke (HUN)	1

=== Top half ===
Round of 32
Murad Ahmadiyev (AZE)	7
Arvi Savolainen (FIN)	3
Artur Omarov (CZE)	1
Nikoloz Kakhelashvili (ITA)	4
Gerard Kurniczak (POL)	0
Kiril Milov (BUL)	9

Round of 16
Artur Sargsyan (UWW)	9
Mindaugas Venckaitis (LTU)	0
Murad Ahmadiyev (AZE)	2
Filip Smetko (CRO)	1
Lucas Lazogianis (GER)	3
Nikoloz Kakhelashvili (ITA)	1
Kiril Milov (BUL)	10
Kiryl Maskevich (UWW)	0

Quarterfinals
Artur Sargsyan (UWW)	4
Murad Ahmadiyev (AZE)	0
Lucas Lazogianis (GER)	1
Kiril Milov (BUL)	8

Semifinals
Artur Sargsyan (UWW)	1
Kiril Milov (BUL)	7

=== Bottom half ===
Round of 32
Vladlen Kozlyuk (UKR)	7
Alex Kessidis (SWE)	3
Mikheil Kajaia (SRB)	1
Abdul Kadir Çebi (TUR)	1

Round of 16
Giorgi Melia (GEO)	2
Richard Karelson (EST)	2
Vladlen Kozlyuk (UKR)	9
Patrik Gordan (ROU)	0
Tyrone Sterkenburg (NED)	0
Abdul Kadir Çebi (TUR)	2
Hayk Khloyan (ARM)	3
Alex Szőke (HUN)	8

Quarterfinals
Giorgi Melia (GEO)	2
Vladlen Kozlyuk (UKR)	11
Abdul Kadir Çebi (TUR)	1
Alex Szőke (HUN)	5

Semifinals
Vladlen Kozlyuk (UKR)	0
Alex Szőke (HUN)	3

=== Repechage ===
Repechage round 1
Gerard Kurniczak (POL)	1
Kiryl Maskevich (UWW)	5

Repechage round 2
Kiryl Maskevich (UWW)	4
Lucas Lazogianis (GER)	1
Hayk Khloyan (ARM)	1
Abdul Kadir Çebi (TUR)	1

Bronze medal matches
Kiryl Maskevich (UWW)	1
Artur Sargsyan (UWW)	4
Abdul Kadir Çebi (TUR)	0
Vladlen Kozlyuk (UKR)	7

== Final standing ==
Rank	Wrestler
1st place, gold medalist(s)	Kiril Milov (BUL)
2nd place, silver medalist(s)	Alex Szőke (HUN)
3rd place, bronze medalist(s)	Artur Sargsyan (UWW)
3rd place, bronze medalist(s)	Vladlen Kozlyuk (UKR)
5	Kiryl Maskevich (UWW)
5	Abdul Kadir Çebi (TUR)
7	Murad Ahmadiyev (AZE)
8	Lucas Lazogianis (GER)
9	Nikoloz Kakhelashvili (ITA)
10	Giorgi Melia (GEO)
11	Hayk Khloyan (ARM)
12	Arvi Savolainen (FIN)
13	Alex Kessidis (SWE)
14	Richard Karelson (EST)
15	Mikheil Kajaia (SRB)
16	Filip Smetko (CRO)
17	Artur Omarov (CZE)
18	Gerard Kurniczak (POL)
19	Tyrone Sterkenburg (NED)
20	Mindaugas Venckaitis (LTU)
21	Patrik Gordan (ROU)
