= 2025 Grand Prix Zagreb Open =

- Host city: Zagreb, Croatia
- Dates: 5-9 February
- Stadium: Dom Sportova

Champions
- Freestyle: United States
- Greco-Roman: Iran
- Women: United States

The 2025 Grand Prix Zagreb Open, is a wrestling event will be held in Zagreb, Croatia between 5 and 9 February 2025.It will be held as the first of the ranking series of United World Wrestling in 2025. With an aim to reward wrestlers participating in Ranking Series tournaments, the United World Wrestling will award prize money to the medal winners in all weight classes with a total prize money of 390,000 Swiss Francs. The gold medal winners at the four Ranking Series tournaments in 2023 will receive 1500 Swiss Francs with the silver medallists getting 750 Swiss Francs. The two bronze medallists will receive 500 Swiss Francs each.

== Ranking Series ==
Ranking Series Calendar 2025:

- 1st Ranking Series: 5-9 February, Croatia, Zagreb ⇒ 2025 Grand Prix Zagreb Open
- 2nd Ranking Series: 26 February-2 March, Tirana, Albania ⇒ 2025 Muhamet Malo Tournament
- 3rd Ranking Series: 29 May-1 June, Mongolia, Ulaanbaatar ⇒ 2025 Ulaanbaatar Open
- 4th Ranking Series: 17-20 July, Hungary, Budapest ⇒ 2025 Polyák Imre, Varga János & Kozma István Memorial Tournament

== Competition schedule ==
All times are (UTC+2)

Date	Time	Event
5 February	10.30-14.30	Qualification rounds & repechage FS 57-61-65-70-74-86 kg
5 February	18.00-20.30	Final matches and awarding ceremony: FS 57-61-65-70-74-86 kg
6 February	10.30-14.30	Qualification rounds & repechage FS 79-92-97-125 kg & WW 50-55 kg
6 February	18.00-20.30	Final matches and awarding ceremony: Finals FS 79-92-97-125 kg & WW 50-55 kg
7 February	10.30-14.30	Qualification rounds & repechage WW 59-62-65-68 kg & GR 63-67 kg
7 February	18.00-20.30	Final matches and awarding ceremony: Finals WW 59-62-65-68 kg & GR 63-67 kg
8 February	10.30-14.30	Qualification rounds & repechage WW 53-57-72-76kg & GR 77-87 kg
8 February	18.00-20.30	Final matches and awarding ceremony: Finals WW 53-57-72-76kg & GR 77-87 kg
9 February	10.30-14.30	Qualification rounds & repechage GR 55-60-72-82-97-130 kg
9 February	18.00-20.30	Final matches and awarding ceremony: Finals GR 55-60-72-82-97-130 kg

== Medal table ==
* Host nation (Croatia)

Rank	Nation	Gold	Silver	Bronze	Total
1	United States	8	3	11	22
2	Iran	6	7	1	14
–	Individual Neutral Athletes	5	3	4	12
3	Azerbaijan	3	5	8	16
4	France	2	1	2	5
5	Hungary	1	4	5	10
6	Norway	1	0	1	2
6	Serbia	1	0	1	2
6	Slovakia	1	0	1	2
9	Denmark	1	0	0	1
10	Moldova	0	1	3	4
11	Lithuania	0	1	1	2
11	Uzbekistan	0	1	1	2
13	Canada	0	1	0	1
13	Czech Republic	0	1	0	1
13	Finland	0	1	0	1
16	Croatia*	0	0	2	2
16	Georgia	0	0	2	2
16	Mexico	0	0	2	2
19	Bulgaria	0	0	1	1
19	Romania	0	0	1	1
19	Ukraine	0	0	1	1
Totals (21 entries)		29	29	48	106

== Team ranking ==
Rank	Men's freestyle		Men's Greco-Roman		Women's freestyle	
Rank	Team	Points	Team	Points	Team	Points
1	United States	190	Iran	147	United States	155
2	Iran	182	Azerbaijan	134	Hungary	96
3	Azerbaijan	125	Hungary	119	France	72
4	Georgia	96	Uzbekistan	72	Azerbaijan	65
5	Slovakia	60	Moldova	66	Lithuania	35
6	France	50	Serbia	43	Croatia	27
7	Ukraine	45	Norway	40	Canada	20
8	Poland	32	Croatia	39	Czech Republic	20
9	Moldova	31	Finland	36	Moldova	18
10	Mexico	30	Romania	33	Bulgaria	15

== Medal overview ==
=== Men's freestyle ===
Event	Gold	Silver	Bronze
57 kg	Spencer Lee; United States	Islam Bazarganov; Azerbaijan	Azamat Tuskaev; Serbia
57 kg	Spencer Lee; United States	Islam Bazarganov; Azerbaijan	Roman Bravo-Young; Mexico
61 kg	Ahmad Javan; Iran	Ebrahim Khari; Iran	Nuraddin Novruzov; Azerbaijan
61 kg	Ahmad Javan; Iran	Ebrahim Khari; Iran	Nahshon Garrett; United States
65 kg	Abbas Ebrahimzadeh; Iran	Joseph McKenna; United States	Ali Rahimzade; Azerbaijan
65 kg	Abbas Ebrahimzadeh; Iran	Joseph McKenna; United States	Khamzat Arsamerzouev; France
70 kg	Kanan Heybatov; Azerbaijan	Sina Khalili; Iran	Vasile Diacon; Moldova
70 kg	Kanan Heybatov; Azerbaijan	Sina Khalili; Iran	Austin Gomez; Mexico
74 kg	Tajmuraz Salkazanov; Slovakia	David Carr; United States	Murad Kuramagomedov; Hungary
74 kg	Tajmuraz Salkazanov; Slovakia	David Carr; United States	Giorgi Elbakidze; Georgia
79 kg	Zelimkhan Khadjiev; France	Mehdi Yousefi; Iran	Rocco Welsh; United States
79 kg	Zelimkhan Khadjiev; France	Mehdi Yousefi; Iran	Vladimeri Gamkrelidze; Georgia
86 kg	Zahid Valencia; United States	Arsenii Dzhioev; Azerbaijan	Nate Jackson; United States
86 kg	Zahid Valencia; United States	Arsenii Dzhioev; Azerbaijan	Trent Hidlay; United States
92 kg	Amir Hossein Firouzpour; Iran	Osman Nurmagomedov; Azerbaijan	Michael Macchiavello; United States
92 kg	Amir Hossein Firouzpour; Iran	Osman Nurmagomedov; Azerbaijan	Abubakr Abakarov; Azerbaijan
97 kg	Kyle Snyder; United States	Abolfazl Babaloo; Iran	Jonathan Aiello; United States
97 kg	Kyle Snyder; United States	Abolfazl Babaloo; Iran	Batyrbek Tsakulov; Slovakia
125 kg	Amir Reza Masoumi; Iran	Mason Parris; United States	Hayden Zillmer; United States
125 kg	Amir Reza Masoumi; Iran	Mason Parris; United States	Murazi Mchedlidze; Ukraine

=== Men's Greco-Roman ===
Event	Gold	Silver	Bronze
55 kg	Elmir Aliyev; Azerbaijan	Mehdi Ahadi; Iran	Andrew Koontz; United States
60 kg	Georgii Tibilov; Serbia	Alisher Ganiev; Uzbekistan	Sadyk Lalaev; Individual Neutral Athletes
60 kg	Georgii Tibilov; Serbia	Alisher Ganiev; Uzbekistan	Pouya Naserpour; Iran
63 kg	Dinislam Bammatov; Individual Neutral Athletes	Mohammad Mehdi Keshtkar; Iran	Ellis Coleman; United States
63 kg	Dinislam Bammatov; Individual Neutral Athletes	Mohammad Mehdi Keshtkar; Iran	Aytjan Khalmakhanov; Uzbekistan
67 kg	Håvard Jørgensen; Norway	Valentin Petic; Moldova	Răzvan Arnăut; Romania
67 kg	Håvard Jørgensen; Norway	Valentin Petic; Moldova	Dominik Etlinger; Croatia
72 kg	Levente Lévai; Hungary	Danial Sohrabi; Iran	István Váncza; Hungary
72 kg	Levente Lévai; Hungary	Danial Sohrabi; Iran	Ruslan Nurullayev; Azerbaijan
77 kg	Sergei Stepanov; Individual Neutral Athletes	Zoltán Lévai; Hungary	Sergey Kutuzov; Individual Neutral Athletes
77 kg	Sergei Stepanov; Individual Neutral Athletes	Zoltán Lévai; Hungary	Alexandru Solovei; Moldova
82 kg	Gholamreza Farokhi; Iran	Erik Szilvássy; Hungary	Gurban Gurbanov; Azerbaijan
82 kg	Gholamreza Farokhi; Iran	Erik Szilvássy; Hungary	Mihail Bradu; Moldova
87 kg	Turpal Bisultanov; Denmark	Dávid Losonczi; Hungary	Exauce Mukubu; Norway
87 kg	Turpal Bisultanov; Denmark	Dávid Losonczi; Hungary	Islam Abbasov; Azerbaijan
97 kg	Artur Sargsian; Individual Neutral Athletes	Abubakar Khaslakhanau; Individual Neutral Athletes	Murad Ahmadiyev; Azerbaijan
97 kg	Artur Sargsian; Individual Neutral Athletes	Abubakar Khaslakhanau; Individual Neutral Athletes	Alex Szőke; Hungary
130 kg	Ali Akbar Yousefi; Iran	Konsta Mäenpää; Finland	Marat Kamparov; Individual Neutral Athletes
130 kg	Ali Akbar Yousefi; Iran	Konsta Mäenpää; Finland	Sarkhan Mammadov; Azerbaijan

=== Women's freestyle ===
Event	Gold	Silver	Bronze
50 kg	Nadezhda Sokolova; Individual Neutral Athletes	Gabija Dilytė; Lithuania	Emma Luttenauer; France
53 kg	no competitors		
55 kg	Tatiana Debien; France	Samantha Stewart; Canada	Róza Szenttamási; Hungary
55 kg	Tatiana Debien; France	Samantha Stewart; Canada	Areana Villaescusa; United States
57 kg	Jacarra Winchester; United States	Zhala Aliyeva; Azerbaijan	Not awarded as there were only 2 competitors.
59 kg	Hiunai Hurbanova; Azerbaijan	Alyona Kolesnik; Azerbaijan	Michaela Beck; United States
62 kg	Adaugo Nwachukwu; United States	Amina Tandelova; Individual Neutral Athletes	Bilyana Dudova; Bulgaria
65 kg	Dinara Kudaeva; Individual Neutral Athletes	Enikő Elekes; Hungary	Elizaveta Petliakova; Individual Neutral Athletes
68 kg	Kennedy Blades; United States	Adéla Hanzlíčková; Czech Republic	Noémi Szabados; Hungary
72 kg	Skylar Grote; United States	Pauline Lecarpentier; France	Veronika Vilk; Croatia
76 kg	Yelena Makoyed; United States	Valeriia Trifonova; Individual Neutral Athletes	Kamilė Gaučaitė; Lithuania

== Participating nations ==
307 wrestlers from 30 countries:

1. Azerbaijan (33)
2. Belgium (1)
3. Brazil (1)
4. Bulgaria (1)
5. Canada (1)
6. Croatia (13) (Host)
7. Czech Republic (7)
8. Denmark (3)
9. Ecuador (1)
10. France (8)
11. Finland (6)
12. Georgia (17)
13. Hungary (31)
14. Iran (33)
15. Israel (4)
16. Italy (1)
17. Kazakhstan (1)
18. Lithuania (2)
19. Moldova (15)
20. Mexico (2)
21. Netherlands (2)
22. Norway (3)
23. Poland (8)
24. Romania (5)
25. Singapore (2)
26. Serbia (10)
27. Slovakia (4)
28. Ukraine (7)
29. United States (42)
30. Uzbekistan (13)
31. Individual Neutral Athletes (30)

== Results ==
Legend

- C — Won by 3 cautions given to the opponent
- F — Won by fall
- R — Retired
- WO — Won by walkover

=== Men's freestyle ===
==== Men's freestyle 57 kg ====
Round of 16
Azamat Tuskaev (SRB)	4
Roberti Dingashvili (GEO)	0
Kamil Kerymov (UKR)	6
Roman Bravo-Young (MEX)	9

Quarterfinals
Islam Bazarganov (AZE)	3
Azamat Tuskaev (SRB)	1
Brandon Courtney (USA)	7
Ahoura Khateri (IRI)	7
Spencer Lee (USA)	11
Luka Gvinjilia (GEO)	0
Roman Bravo-Young (MEX)	6
Daniel Deshazer (USA)	2

Semifinals
Islam Bazarganov (AZE)	10
Ahoura Khateri (IRI)	0
Spencer Lee (USA)	8
Roman Bravo-Young (MEX)	3

Final
Islam Bazarganov (AZE)	2
Spencer Lee (USA)	6

Bronze medal match
Azamat Tuskaev (SRB)	11
Ahoura Khateri (IRI)	0
Luka Gvinjilia (GEO)	2
Roman Bravo-Young (MEX)	11

==== Men's freestyle 61 kg ====
Round of 16
Ebrahim Khari (IRI)	10^{F}
Nuraddin Novruzov (AZE)	0
Josh Kramer (ECU)	6
Nahshon Garrett (USA)	12
Michael McGee (USA)	8
Andrii Dzhelep (UKR)	6

Quarterfinals
Leonid Colesnic (MDA)	0
Ebrahim Khari (IRI)	10
Arman Eloyan (FRA)	2
Reza Momeni (IRI)	9
Ahmad Javan (IRI)	7
Nahshon Garrett (USA)	2
Michael McGee (USA)	11
Giorgi Goniashvili (GEO)	14

Semifinals
Ebrahim Khari (IRI)	3
Reza Momeni (IRI)	3
Ahmad Javan (IRI)	9
Giorgi Goniashvili (GEO)	4

Final
Ebrahim Khari (IRI)	0
Ahmad Javan (IRI)	10

Repechage round
Nuraddin Novruzov (AZE)	14
Leonid Colesnic (MDA)	3

Bronze medal match
Nuraddin Novruzov (AZE)	8
Reza Momeni (IRI)	4
Nahshon Garrett (USA)	16
Giorgi Goniashvili (GEO)	11

==== Men's freestyle 65 kg ====
Round of 16
Ali Rahimzade (AZE)	3
Krzysztof Bieńkowski (POL)	0
Nika Zakashvili (GEO)	0
Ali Khorramdel (IRI)	10
Evan Henderson (USA)	11
Goga Otinashvili (GEO)	12
Yasin Rezaei (IRI)	11
Khamzat Arsamerzouev (FRA)	13
Ayub Musaev (BEL)	12
Zoltán Mizsei (HUN)	2

Quarterfinals
Joseph McKenna (USA)	7
Ali Rahimzade (AZE)	4
Ali Khorramdel (IRI)	9
Goga Otinashvili (GEO)	13^{F}
Abbas Ebrahimzadeh (IRI)	8
Khamzat Arsamerzouev (FRA)	3
Ayub Musaev (BEL)	0
Erik Arushanian (UKR)	3

Semifinals
Joseph McKenna (USA)	3
Goga Otinashvili (GEO)	1
Abbas Ebrahimzadeh (IRI)	14
Erik Arushanian (UKR)	4

Final
Joseph McKenna (USA)	6
Abbas Ebrahimzadeh (IRI)	8

Bronze medal match
Ali Rahimzade (AZE)	6
Goga Otinashvili (GEO)	0
Khamzat Arsamerzouev (FRA)	2
Erik Arushanian (UKR)	2

==== Men's freestyle 70 kg ====
Round of 16
Vasile Diacon (MDA)	7
Ihor Nykyforuk (UKR)	4
Austin Gomez (MEX)	5
Kanan Heybatov (AZE)	9
Jarrett Jacques (USA)	3
Ismail Musukaev (HUN)	2

Quarterfinals
Sina Khalili (IRI)	5
Vasile Diacon (MDA)	2
James Green (USA)	4
Alec Pantaleo (USA)	3
Patryk Ołenczyn (POL)	1
Kanan Heybatov (AZE)	11
Jarrett Jacques (USA)	3
Ebrahim Elahi (IRI)	4

Semifinals
Sina Khalili (IRI)	WO
James Green (USA)
Kanan Heybatov (AZE)	10
Ebrahim Elahi (IRI)	5

Final
Sina Khalili (IRI)	1
Kanan Heybatov (AZE)	12

Repechage round
Austin Gomez (MEX)	WO
Patryk Ołenczyn (POL)

Bronze medal match
Vasile Diacon (MDA)	WO
James Green (USA)
Austin Gomez (MEX)	9
Ebrahim Elahi (IRI)	3

==== Men's freestyle 74 kg ====
Round of 16
David Carr (USA)	11
Szymon Wojtkowski (POL)	0
Giorgi Elbakidze (GEO)	6
Luka Chkhitunidze (GEO)	2

Quarterfinals
Kamil Rybicki (POL)	0
David Carr (USA)	10
Ali Rezaei (IRI)	1
Murad Kuramagomedov (HUN)	6
Aghanazar Novruzov (AZE)	0
Tajmuraz Salkazanov (SVK)	5
Giorgi Elbakidze (GEO)	10
Vedran Luketin (CRO)	0

Semifinals
David Carr (USA)	12
Murad Kuramagomedov (HUN)	2
Tajmuraz Salkazanov (SVK)	11
Giorgi Elbakidze (GEO)	0

Final
David Carr (USA)	0
Tajmuraz Salkazanov (SVK)	4

Repechage round
Szymon Wojtkowski (POL)	0
Kamil Rybicki (POL)	2

Bronze medal match
Kamil Rybicki (POL)	0
Murad Kuramagomedov (HUN)	10
Aghanazar Novruzov (AZE)	2
Giorgi Elbakidze (GEO)	3

==== Men's freestyle 79 kg ====
Round of 16
Otar Adeishvili (GEO)	4
Zelimkhan Khadjiev (FRA)	8

Quarterfinals
Andrzej Sokalski (POL)	0
Zelimkhan Khadjiev (FRA)	5
Evan Wick (USA)	2
Rocco Welsh (USA)	6
Achsarbek Gulajev (SVK)	0
Mehdi Yousefi (IRI)	10
Vladimer Gamkrelidze (GEO)	8
Giorgi Gogritchiani (GEO)	3

Semifinals
Zelimkhan Khadjiev (FRA)	4
Rocco Welsh (USA)	2
Mehdi Yousefi (IRI)	4
Vladimer Gamkrelidze (GEO)	1

Final
Zelimkhan Khadjiev (FRA)	5
Mehdi Yousefi (IRI)	3

Repechage round
Otar Adeishvili (GEO)	8
Andrzej Sokalski (POL)	4

Bronze medal match
Otar Adeishvili (GEO)	3
Rocco Welsh (USA)	9
Achsarbek Gulajev (SVK)	0
Vladimer Gamkrelidze (GEO)	7

==== Men's freestyle 86 kg ====
Round of 16
Zahid Valencia (USA)	10
Matt Finesilver (ISR)	0
Mukhammed Aliiev (UKR)	0
Arsenii Dzhioev (AZE)	10

Quarterfinals
Abolfazl Rahmani (IRI)	2
Zahid Valencia (USA)	5
Nate Jackson (USA)	9
Krzysztof Sadowik (POL)	0
Eugeniu Mihalcean (MDA)	2
Trent Hidlay (USA)	3
Arsenii Dzhioev (AZE)	10
Tariel Gaphrindashvili (GEO)	0

Semifinals
Zahid Valencia (USA)	12
Naten Jackson (USA)	2
Trent Hidlay (USA)	0
Arsenii Dzhioev (AZE)	5

Final
Zahid Valencia (USA)	8
Arsenii Dzhioev (AZE)	0

Repechage round
Matt Finesilver (ISR)	WO
Abolfazl Rahmani (IRI)
Mukhammed Aliiev (UKR)
Tariel Gaphrindashvili (GEO)	WO

Bronze medal match
Matt Finesilver (ISR)	2
Nate Jackson (USA)	12
Trent Hidlay (USA)	10
Tariel Gaphrindashvili (GEO)	4

==== Men's freestyle 92 kg ====
Round of 16
Amir Hossein Firouzpour (IRI)	11
Zaur Beradze (GEO)	0
Ben Honis (ITA)	8
Cezary Sadowski (POL)	2
Adlan Viskhanov (FRA)	WO
~~Aaron Brooks (USA)~~
Abubakr Abakarov (AZE)	6
Mohammad Mobin Azimi (IRI)	5
Iuza Tsertsvadze (GEO)	10
Krisztián Angyal (HUN)	0
Ivan Ichizli (MDA)	3
Boris Makoev (SVK)	8
Uri Kalashnikov (ISR)	0
Osman Nurmagomedov (AZE)	5

Quarterfinals
Michael Macchiavello (USA)	0
Amir Hossein Firouzpour (IRI)	5
Ben Honis (ITA)	1
Adlan Viskhanov (FRA)	12
Abubakr Abakarov (AZE)	11
Iuza Tsertsvadze (GEO)	11
Boris Makoev (SVK)	0
Osman Nurmagomedov (AZE)	4

Semifinals
Amir Hossein Firouzpour (IRI)	6
Adlan Viskhanov (FRA)	0
Abubakr Abakarov (AZE)	5
Osman Nurmagomedov (AZE)	6

Final
Amir Hossein Firouzpour (IRI)	11
Osman Nurmagomedov (AZE)	4

Repechage round
Zaur Beradze (GEO)	4
Michael Macchiavello (USA)	12
Boris Makoev (SVK)	4
Uri Kalashnikov (ISR)	2

Bronze medal match
Michael Macchiavello (USA)	9
Adlan Viskhanov (FRA)	1
Boris Makoev (SVK)	2
Abubakr Abakarov (AZE)	9

==== Men's freestyle 97 kg ====
Quarterfinals		Semifinals		Final
Andro Margishvili (GEO)	0
Abolfazl Babaloo (IRI)	6	Abolfazl Babaloo (IRI)	6
Merab Suleimanishvili (GEO)		Jonathan Aiello (USA)	5
Jonathan Aiello (USA)	WO			Abolfazl Babaloo (IRI)	1
Batyrbek Tsakulov (SVK)	11			Kyle Snyder (USA)	12
Radu Lefter (MDA)	0	Batyrbek Tsakulov (SVK)	0
Richárd Végh (HUN)	0	Kyle Snyder (USA)	10
Kyle Snyder (USA)	11

Bronze medals
Andro Margishvili (GEO)
Jonathan Aiello (USA)	WO
Richárd Végh (HUN)	0
Batyrbek Tsakulov (SVK)	10

==== Men's freestyle 125 kg ====
Quarterfinals		Semifinals		Final
Mason Parris (USA)	13
Trent Hillger (USA)	2	Mason Parris (USA)	4
Hayden Zillmer (USA)	17	Hayden Zillmer (USA)	2
Nika Berulava (GEO)	6			Mason Parris (USA)	0
Murazi Mchedlidze (UKR)	0			Amir Reza Masoumi (IRI)	11
Amir Reza Masoumi (IRI)	5	Amir Reza Masoumi (IRI)	8
Kamil Kościółek (POL)	9	Kamil Kościółek (POL)	0
Solomon Manashvili (GEO)	7

Bronze medals
Trent Hillger (USA)	3
Hayden Zillmer (USA)	10
Murazi Mchedlidze (UKR)	6
Kamil Kościółek (POL)	1

=== Men's Greco-Roman ===
==== Men's Greco-Roman 55 kg ====
9 February

Pos	Athlete	Pld	W	L	CP	TP	AZE	IRI	UZB	SGP
1	Elmir Aliyev (AZE)	3	3	0	10	24	—	6–3	10–5	8–0
2	Mehdi Ahadi (IRI)	3	2	1	8	16	1–3 PO1	—	4–2	9–0
3	Jasurbek Ortikboev (UZB)	3	1	2	6	15	1–3 PO1	1–3 PO1	—	8–0
4	Alexander Cuevas (SGP)	3	0	3	0	0	0–4 SU	0–4 SU	0–4 SU	—

Source: UWW

Pos	Athlete	Pld	W	L	CP	TP	MDA	USA	HUN
1	Artiom Deleanu (MDA)	2	2	0	7	15	—	6–1	9–0
2	Andrew Koontz (USA)	2	1	1	6	11	1–3 PO1	—	10–4 Fall
3	Péter Tótok (HUN)	2	0	2	0	4	0–4 SU	0–5 FA	—

Source: UWW

Semifinals
Elmir Aliyev (AZE)	5
Andrew Koontz (USA)	0
Artiom Deleanu (MDA)	0
Mehdi Ahadi (IRI)	9

Final
Elmir Aliyev (AZE)	7
Mehdi Ahadi (IRI)	0
Bronze medal
Andrew Koontz (USA)	9
Artiom Deleanu (MDA)	1

==== Men's Greco-Roman 60 kg ====
Round of 16
Sadyk Lalaev (AIN)	0
Alisher Ganiev (UZB)	8
Melkamu Fetene (ISR)	1
Nihat Mammadli (AZE)	11
Mehroj Bakhramov (UZB)	9
Eldaniz Azizli (AZE)	0
Denis Mihai (ROU)	0
Pouya Naserpour (IRI)	10
Dalton Roberts (USA)	0
Emin Sefershaev (AIN)	11
Huseyn Garibov (AZE)	0
Georgii Tibilov (SRB)	6

Quarterfinals
Maxwell Black (USA)	0
Alisher Ganiev (UZB)	9
Nihat Mammadli (AZE)	6
Mehroj Bakhramov (UZB)	11
Pouya Naserpour (IRI)	10
Emin Sefershaev (AIN)	1
Georgii Tibilov (SRB)	8
Abere Fetene (ISR)	0

Semifinals
Alisher Ganiev (UZB)	9
Mehroj Bakhramov (UZB)	0
Pouya Naserpour (IRI)	0
Georgii Tibilov (SRB)	4

Final
Alisher Ganiev (UZB)	4
Georgii Tibilov (SRB)	6

Repechage round
Sadyk Lalaev (AIN)	8
Maxwell Black (USA)	0
Huseyn Garibov (AZE)	4
Abere Fetene (ISR)	1

Bronze medal match
Sadyk Lalaev (AIN)	9
Mehroj Bakhramov (UZB)	0
Huseyn Garibov (AZE)	1
Pouya Naserpour (IRI)	9

==== Men's Greco-Roman 63 kg ====
Round of 16
Hleb Makaranka (AIN)	9
Corneliu Rusu (MDA)	6
Ellis Coleman (USA)	0
Dinislam Bammatov (AIN)	8
Vitalie Eriomenco (MDA)	4
Otto Black (USA)	0
Erfan Jarkani (IRI)	7
Ildar Hafizov (USA)	5
Aytjan Khalmakhanov (UZB)	14
Murad Mammadov (AZE)	5

Quarterfinals
Ziya Babashov (AZE)	2
Hleb Makaranka (AIN)	1
Dinislam Bammatov (AIN)	9
Vitalie Eriomenco (MDA)	0
Islomjon Bakhromov (UZB)	3
Erfan Jarkani (IRI)	1
Aytjan Khalmakhanov (UZB)	4
Mohammad Mehdi Keshtkar (IRI)	5

Semifinals
Ziya Babashov (AZE)	0
Dinislam Bammatov (AIN)	8
Islomjon Bakhromov (UZB)	1
Mohammad Mehdi Keshtkar (IRI)	10

Final
Dinislam Bammatov (AIN)	10^{F}
Mohammad Mehdi Keshtkar (IRI)	0

Repechage round
Ellis Coleman (USA)	9
Vitalie Eriomenco (MDA)	0

Bronze medal match
Ellis Coleman (USA)	5
Ziya Babashov (AZE)	3
Aytjan Khalmakhanov (UZB)	5
Islomjon Bakhromov (UZB)	4

==== Men's Greco-Roman 67 kg ====
Round of 16
Noe Poč (SRB)	0
Ahmad Reza Mohsennejad (IRI)	8
Valentin Petic (MDA)	5
Răzvan Arnăut (ROU)	0
Hasrat Jafarov (AZE)	5
Morten Thoresen (NOR)	1
Håvard Jørgensen (NOR)	3
Dominik Etlinger (CRO)	0
Sebastian Nađ (SRB)	3
Farid Khalilov (AZE)	3
Alejandro Sancho (USA)	1
Daniial Agaev (AIN)	3

Quarterfinals
Nozimjon Boykuziev (UZB)	3
Ahmad Reza Mohsennejad (IRI)	8
Valentin Petic (MDA)	0
Hasrat Jafarov (AZE)	7^{R}
Håvard Jørgensen (NOR)	1
Sebastian Nađ (SRB)	1
Daniial Agaev (AIN)	3
Mohammad Reza Gholami (IRI)	7

Semifinals
Ahmad Reza Mohsennejad (IRI)	1
Valentin Petic (MDA)	6
Håvard Jørgensen (NOR)	9
Mohammad Reza Gholami (IRI)	0

Final
Valentin Petic (MDA)	1
Håvard Jørgensen (NOR)	9

Repechage round
Răzvan Arnăut (ROU)	WO
Hasrat Jafarov (AZE)
Dominik Etlinger (CRO)	1
Sebastian Nađ (SRB)	1

Bronze medal match
Răzvan Arnăut (ROU)	5
Ahmad Reza Mohsennejad (IRI)	0
Dominik Etlinger (CRO)	10
Mohammad Reza Gholami (IRI)	1

==== Men's Greco-Roman 72 kg ====
Round of 16
Denis Mertl (CZE)	3
Ulvu Ganizade (AZE)	4
Mihai Petic (MDA)	0
Abdullo Aliev (UZB)	9
István Váncza (HUN)	3
Aliaksandr Liavonchyk (AIN)	1
Benji Peak (USA)	0
Mohammad Reza Geraei (IRI)	11
Iman Mohammadi (IRI)	4
Mikko Peltokangas (FIN)	4
Levente Lévai (HUN)	4
Ruslan Nurullayev (AZE)	1
Luka Ivančić (CRO)	3
Matias Lipasti (FIN)	4

Quarterfinals
Danial Sohrabi (IRI)	WO
Ulvu Ganizade (AZE)
Abdullo Aliev (UZB)	0
István Váncza (HUN)	9
Mohammad Reza Geraei (IRI)	8
Iman Mohammadi (IRI)	3
Levente Lévai (HUN)	5
Matias Lipasti (FIN)	1

Semifinals
Danial Sohrabi (IRI)	6
István Váncza (HUN)	1
Mohammad Reza Geraei (IRI)	1
Levente Lévai (HUN)	1

Final
Danial Sohrabi (IRI)	3
Levente Lévai (HUN)	4

Repechage round
Ruslan Nurullayev (AZE)	11
Matias Lipasti (FIN)	0

Bronze medal match
~~Ulvu Ganizade (AZE)~~
István Váncza (HUN)	WO
Ruslan Nurullayev (AZE)	WO
Mohammad Reza Geraei (IRI)

==== Men's Greco-Roman 77 kg ====
Final
Sergei Stepanov (AIN)	4
Zoltán Lévai (HUN)	3

Round of 32
Artur Politaiev (UKR)	2
Antonio Kamenjašević (CRO)	5
Amin Kavianinejad (IRI)	0
Alexandrin Guțu (MDA)	8
Akseli Yli-Hannuksela (FIN)	0
Amir Abdi (IRI)	10
Jonni Sarkkinen (FIN)	1
Sergei Stepanov (AIN)	5
Sanan Suleymanov (AZE)	1
Aleksa Ilić (SRB)	1

Round of 16
Sergey Kutuzov (AIN)	4
Antonio Kamenjašević (CRO)	2
Alexandrin Guțu (MDA)	4
Amir Abdi (IRI)	3
Khasay Hasanli (AZE)	6
Sergei Stepanov (AIN)	7
Sanan Suleymanov (AZE)	7
Róbert Fritsch (HUN)	1

Quarterfinals
Sergey Kutuzov (AIN)	10
Alexandrin Guțu (MDA)	0
Sergei Stepanov (AIN)	4
Sanan Suleymanov (AZE)	0

Semifinals
Sergey Kutuzov (AIN)	0
Sergei Stepanov (AIN)	8

Round of 32
Doniyorkhon Nakibov (UZB)	1
Ali Oskou (IRI)	6
~~Pavel Puklavec (CRO)~~
Aram Vardanyan (UZB)	WO
Illia Valeuski (AIN)	10^{F}
Oliver Krüger (DEN)	2
Maksim Shedz (AIN)	0
Alexandru Solovei (MDA)	6

Round of 16
Michal Zelenka (CZE)	9
Ali Oskou (IRI)	6
Aram Vardanyan (UZB)	0
Zoltán Lévai (HUN)	7
Aryan Bin Azman (SGP)	0
Illia Valeuski (AIN)	9
Alexandru Solovei (MDA)	3
Davud Mammadov (AZE)	0

Quarterfinals
Michal Zelenka (CZE)	1
Zoltán Lévai (HUN)	10
Illia Valeuski (AIN)	4
Alexandru Solovei (MDA)	6

Semifinals
Zoltán Lévai (HUN)	5
Alexandru Solovei (MDA)	1

Repechage round 1
Jonni Sarkkinen (FIN)	5
Khasay Hasanli (AZE)	14

Repechage round 2
Khasay Hasanli (AZE)	0
Sanan Suleymanov (AZE)	8
Aram Vardanyan (UZB)	3
Michal Zelenka (CZE)	1

Bronze medals
Sanan Suleymanov (AZE)	1
Sergey Kutuzov (AIN)	3
Aram Vardanyan (UZB)	1
Alexandru Solovei (MDA)	3

==== Men's Greco-Roman 82 kg ====
Round of 16
Dominik Botos (HUN)	0
Gholamreza Farrokhi (IRI)	9
Jesse Porter (USA)	1
Ilya Bitseyeu (AIN)	3
Uroš Lečić (SRB)	0
Gurban Gurbanov (AZE)	8
Marek Vrba (CZE)	3
Péter Dömök (HUN)	3
Shuai Mamedau (AIN)	3
Mihail Bradu (MDA)	2^{F}
Erik Szilvássy (HUN)	8
Samandar Bobonazarov (UZB)	7

Quarterfinals
Vasile Cojoc (ROU)	0
Gholamreza Farrokhi (IRI)	9
Ilya Bitseyeu (AIN)	0
Gurban Gurbanov (AZE)	6
Marek Vrba (CZE)	0
Mihail Bradu (MDA)	9
Erik Szilvássy (HUN)	1
Karlo Kodrić (CRO)	1

Semifinals
Gholamreza Farrokhi (IRI)	11
Gurban Gurbanov (AZE)	3
Mihail Bradu (MDA)	3
Erik Szilvássy (HUN)	5

Final
Gholamreza Farrokhi (IRI)	6
Erik Szilvássy (HUN)	2

Repechage round
Dominik Botos (HUN)	0
Vasile Cojoc (ROU)	8
Samandar Bobonazarov (UZB)	3
Karlo Kodrić (CRO)	8

Bronze medal match
Vasile Cojoc (ROU)	0
Gurban Gurbanov (AZE)	9
Karlo Kodrić (CRO)	1
Mihail Bradu (MDA)	2

==== Men's Greco-Roman 87 kg ====
Final
Dávid Losonczi (HUN)	4
Turpal Bisultanov (DEN)	5

Round of 32
Dávid Losonczi (HUN)	9
Miloš Perović (SRB)	0
Aleksandr Komarov (SRB)	5
Rafig Huseynov (AZE)	3
Ivan Huklek (CRO)	13
Spencer Woods (USA)	2
Exauce Mukubu (NOR)	6
Matej Mandić (CRO)	3

Round of 16
Vjekoslav Luburić (CRO)	0
Dávid Losonczi (HUN)	9
Aleksandr Komarov (SRB)	3
Patrik Gordan (ROU)	0
Nasser Alizadeh (IRI)	4
Ivan Huklek (CRO)	8
Exauce Mukubu (NOR)	4
Ihar Yarashevich (AIN)	2

Quarterfinals
Dávid Losonczi (HUN)	6
Aleksandr Komarov (SRB)	3
Ivan Huklek (CRO)	1
Exauce Mukubu (NOR)	5

Semifinals
Dávid Losonczi (HUN)	5
Exauce Mukubu (NOR)	0

Round of 32
Ondřej Havelka (CZE)	1
Milad Alirzaev (AIN)	9
Aues Gonibov (AIN)	5
Rahimjon Uzokov (UZB)	0
Jalgasbay Berdimuratov (UZB)	3
Islam Abbasov (AZE)	4
Islam Yevloyev (KAZ)	6
Tamás Lévai (HUN)	1

Round of 16
Stanislau Shafarenka (AIN)	1
Milad Alirzaev (AIN)	6
Aues Gonibov (AIN)	9
Marcel Sterkenburg (NED)	4
István Takács (HUN)	3
Islam Abbasov (AZE)	3
Islam Yevloyev (KAZ)	0
Turpal Bisultanov (DEN)	5

Quarterfinals
Milad Alirzaev (AIN)	3
Aues Gonibov (AIN)	1
Islam Abbasov (AZE)	0
Turpal Bisultanov (DEN)	4

Semifinals
Milad Alirzaev (AIN)	1
Turpal Bisultanov (DEN)	1

Repechage round 1
Miloš Perović (SRB)	1
Vjekoslav Luburić (CRO)	1

Repechage round 2
Vjekoslav Luburić (CRO)	0
Aleksandr Komarov (SRB)	9
Islam Yevloyev (KAZ)
Islam Abbasov (AZE)	WO

Bronze medals
Aleksandr Komarov (SRB)	4
Exauce Mukubu (NOR)	5
Islam Abbasov (AZE)	5
Milad Alirzaev (AIN)	5

==== Men's Greco-Roman 97 kg ====
Final
Abubakar Khaslakhanau (AIN)	2
Artur Sargsian (AIN)	5

Round of 32
Hamidreza Badkan (IRI)	2
Kiryl Maskevich (AIN)	1
Arif Niftullayev (AZE)	3
Tyrone Sterkenburg (NED)	2

Round of 16
Murad Ahmadiyev (AZE)	2
Magomed Murtazaliev (AIN)	1
Hamidreza Badkan (IRI)	0
Abubakar Khaslakhanau (AIN)	8
Shayan Habib Zare (IRI)	8
Arif Niftullayev (AZE)	0
Luka Katić (SRB)	1
Mathias Bak (DEN)	4

Quarterfinals
Murad Ahmadiyev (AZE)	2
Abubakar Khaslakhanau (AIN)	12
Shayan Habib Zare (IRI)	2
Mathias Bak (DEN)	0

Semifinals
Abubakar Khaslakhanau (AIN)	8
Shayan Habib Zare (IRI)	0

Round of 32
Artur Sargsian (AIN)	8
Uladzislau Pustashylau (AIN)	0
Vendel Vitai (HUN)	4
Tomislav Brkan (CRO)	5

Round of 16
Uroš Krstin (SRB)	0
Kristian Lukač (CRO)	3
Artur Sargsian (AIN)	3
Alex Szőke (HUN)	2
Nicu Ojog (ROU)	9
Tomislav Brkan (CRO)	3
Ondřej Dadák (CZE)	1
Arvi Savolainen (FIN)	8

Quarterfinals
Kristian Lukač (CRO)	0
Artur Sargsian (AIN)	11
Nicu Ojog (ROU)	3
Arvi Savolainen (FIN)	5

Semifinals
Artur Sargsian (AIN)	9
Arvi Savolainen (FIN)	0

Repechage round 1
Uladzislau Pustashylau (AIN)	1
Alex Szőke (HUN)	4

Repechage round 2
Hamidreza Badkan (IRI)	5
Murad Ahmadiyev (AZE)	5
Alex Szőke (HUN)	10
Kristian Lukač (CRO)	2

Bronze medals
Murad Ahmadiyev (AZE)	6
Shayan Habib Zare (IRI)	3
Alex Szőke (HUN)	7
Arvi Savolainen (FIN)	1

==== Men's Greco-Roman 130 kg ====
Round of 16
Beka Kandelaki (AZE)	9
Dáriusz Vitek (HUN)	0
Temurbek Nasimov (UZB)	3
Dzmitry Zarubski (AIN)	5
Konsta Mäenpää (FIN)	1
Marat Kamparov (AIN)	1
Artur Sarkisjan (CZE)	1
Sarkhan Mammadov (AZE)	3
Sergey Semenov (AIN)	1
Ali Akbar Yousefi (IRI)	10

Quarterfinals
László Darabos (HUN)	2
Beka Kandelaki (AZE)	8
Dzmitry Zarubski (AIN)	4
Konsta Mäenpää (FIN)	6^{F}
Courtney Freeman (USA)	1
Sarkhan Mammadov (AZE)	3
Ali Akbar Yousefi (IRI)	6
Koppány László (HUN)	1

Semifinals
Beka Kandelaki (AZE)	3
Konsta Mäenpää (FIN)	4
Sarkhan Mammadov (AZE)	1
Ali Akbar Yousefi (IRI)	9

Final
Konsta Mäenpää (FIN)	1
Ali Akbar Yousefi (IRI)	9

Repechage round
Marat Kamparov (AIN)	8
Dzmitry Zarubski (AIN)	0
Sergey Semenov (AIN)	5
Koppány László (HUN)	9

Bronze medal match
Marat Kamparov (AIN)	3
Beka Kandelaki (AZE)	2
Koppány László (HUN)	0
Sarkhan Mammadov (AZE)	4^{F}

=== Women's freestyle ===
==== Women's freestyle 50 kg ====
6 February

Pos	Athlete	Pld	W	L	CP	TP	AIN	LTU	FRA	BRA
1	Nadezhda Sokolova (AIN)	3	3	0	12	34	—	10–0	12–2	12–0
2	Gabija Dilytė (LTU)	3	2	1	8	9	0–4 SU	—	5–3	4–0 Fall
3	Emma Luttenauer (FRA)	3	1	2	5	14	1–4 SU1	1–3 PO1	—	9–4
4	Kamila Barbosa (BRA)	3	0	3	1	4	0–4 SU	0–5 FA	1–3 PO1	—

Source: UWW

==== Women's freestyle 55 kg ====
Quarterfinals		Semifinals		Final
Gerda Terék (HUN)	9
Elnura Mammadova (AZE)	13	Elnura Mammadova (AZE)	1
Róza Szenttamási (HUN)	4	Samantha Stewart (CAN)	12
Samantha Stewart (CAN)	10^{F}			Samantha Stewart (CAN)	2
Ekaterina Verbina (AIN)	10			Tatiana Debien (FRA)	6
Mariana Drăguțan (MDA)	2	Ekaterina Verbina (AIN)	4
Areana Villaescusa (USA)	4	Tatiana Debien (FRA)	5
Tatiana Debien (FRA)	4

Bronze medals
Róza Szenttamási (HUN)	5^{F}
Elnura Mammadova (AZE)	0
Areana Villaescusa (USA)	13
Ekaterina Verbina (AIN)	2

==== Women's freestyle 57 kg ====
8 February

Pos	Athlete	Pld	W	L	CP	TP	USA	AZE
1	Jacarra Winchester (USA)	1	1	0	3	7	—	7–4
2	Zhala Aliyeva (AZE)	1	0	1	1	4	1–3 PO1	—

Source: UWW

==== Women's freestyle 59 kg ====
7 February

Pos	Athlete	Pld	W	L	CP	TP	AZE	USA	HUN
1	Alyona Kolesnik (AZE)	2	2	0	8	8	—	3–0 Fall	5–2
2	Michaela Beck (USA)	2	1	1	3	5	0–5 FA	—	5–2
3	Erika Bognár (HUN)	2	0	2	2	4	1–3 PO1	1–3 PO1	—

Source: UWW

Pos	Athlete	Pld	W	L	CP	TP	AZE	MDA	USA
1	Hiunai Hurbanova (AZE)	2	2	0	8	11	—	8–2	3–0 Fall
2	Mariana Cherdivara (MDA)	2	1	1	4	7	1–3 PO1	—	5–0
3	Sofia Macaluso (USA)	2	0	2	0	0	0–5 FA	0–3 PO	—

Source: UWW

Semifinals
Alyona Kolesnik (AZE)	3
Mariana Cherdivara (MDA)	1
Hiunai Hurbanova (AZE)	6
Michaela Beck (USA)	0

Final
Alyona Kolesnik (AZE)	2
Hiunai Hurbanova (AZE)	4
Bronze medal
Mariana Cherdivara (MDA)
Michaela Beck (USA)	WO

==== Women's freestyle 62 kg ====
7 February

Pos	Athlete	Pld	W	L	CP	TP	USA	AIN	BUL	HUN	HUN
1	Adaugo Nwachukwu (USA)	4	4	0	16	24	—	9–8	5–3	10–0 Fall	WO
2	Amina Tandelova (AIN)	4	3	1	13	22	1–3 PO1	—	3–2	11–0	WO
3	Bilyana Dudova (BUL)	4	2	2	10	7	1–3 PO1	1–3 PO1	—	2–0	WO
4	Nikolett Szabó (HUN)	4	1	3	5	0	0–5 FA	0–4 SU	0–3 PO	—	WO
—	Yasmine Soliman (HUN)	4	0	4	0	0	0–5 FO	0–5 FO	0–5 FO	0–5 FO	—

Source: UWW

==== Women's freestyle 65 kg ====
7 February

Pos	Athlete	Pld	W	L	CP	TP	AIN	HUN	AIN	CRO
1	Dinara Kudaeva (AIN)	3	3	0	11	12	—	5–0	3–2	4–0 Fall
2	Enikő Elekes (HUN)	3	2	1	8	4	0–3 PO	—	4–4	WO
3	Elizaveta Petliakova (AIN)	3	1	2	7	10	1–3 PO1	1–3 PO1	—	4–1 Fall
4	Milla Anđelić (CRO)	3	0	3	0	1	0–5 FA	0–5 IN	0–5 FA	—

Source: UWW

==== Women's freestyle 68 kg ====
7 February

Pos	Athlete	Pld	W	L	CP	TP	USA	CZE	HUN	FRA	HUN
1	Kennedy Blades (USA)	4	4	0	18	32	—	4–0 Fall	10–0	6–0 Fall	12–0
2	Adéla Hanzlíčková (CZE)	4	3	1	11	12	0–5 FA	—	3–2	6–2	3–0 Fall
3	Noémi Szabados (HUN)	4	2	2	7	19	0–4 SU	1–3 PO1	—	10–10	7–0
4	Kendra Dacher (FRA)	4	1	3	6	23	0–5 FA	1–3 PO1	1–3 PO1	—	11–0
5	Karolina Pók (HUN)	4	0	4	0	0	0–4 SU	0–5 FA	0–3 PO	0–4 SU	—

Source: UWW

==== Women's freestyle 72 kg ====
8 February

Pos	Athlete	Pld	W	L	CP	TP	USA	FRA	CRO	HUN	AZE
1	Skylar Grote (USA)	4	4	0	15	33	—	2–0	11–0	10–0	10–0
2	Pauline Lecarpentier (FRA)	4	3	1	9	14	0–3 PO	—	8–0	3–0	3–0
3	Veronika Vilk (CRO)	4	2	2	8	8	0–4 SU	0–3 PO	—	2–1 Fall	6–2
4	Noémi Osváth-Nagy (HUN)	4	1	3	3	11	0–4 SU	0–3 PO	0–5 FA	—	10–1
5	Zahra Karimzada (AZE)	4	0	4	2	3	0–4 SU	0–3 PO	1–3 PO1	1–3 PO1	—

Source: UWW

==== Women's freestyle 76 kg ====
8 February

Pos	Athlete	Pld	W	L	CP	TP	USA	AIN	LTU	HUN
1	Yelena Makoyed (USA)	3	3	0	14	24	—	9–4 Fall	4–2 Fall	11–0
2	Valeriia Trifonova (AIN)	3	2	1	8	14	0–5 FA	—	2–0	8–0 Fall
3	Kamilė Gaučaitė (LTU)	3	1	2	3	8	0–5 FA	0–3 PO	—	6–0
4	Veronika Nyikos (HUN)	3	0	3	0	0	0–4 SU	0–5 FA	0–3 PO	—

Source: UWW
