= 2025 European Wrestling Championships – Men's Greco-Roman 97 kg =

Wrestling competition

Men's Greco-Roman 97 kg at the 2025 European Wrestling Championships
- Venue: X-Bionic Sphere
- Location: Bratislava, Slovakia
- Dates: 12-13 April
- Competitors: 23

Medalists
gold medal	Kiril Milov	Bulgaria
silver medal	Lucas Lazogianis	Germany
bronze medal	Alex Szőke	Hungary
bronze medal	Kiryl Maskevich

The men's Greco-Roman 97 kg is a competition featured at the 2025 European Wrestling Championships, and was held in Bratislava, Slovakia on April 12 and 13.

== Results ==
Legend

- F — Won by fall
- WO — Won by walkover

=== Final ===
Final
Kiril Milov (BUL)	7
Lucas Lazogianis (GER)	1

=== Top half ===
Round of 32
Felix Baldauf (NOR)	1
Nikoloz Kakhelashvili (ITA)	1
Nicu Ojog (ROU)	0
Kiril Milov (BUL)	7
Artsiom Shumski (POL)	1
Giorgi Melia (GEO)	4

Round of 16
Artur Aleksanyan (ARM)	5
Richard Karelson (EST)	1
Nikoloz Kakhelashvili (ITA)	1
Serhii Omelin (UKR)	1
Artur Omarov (CZE)	1
Kiril Milov (BUL)	5
Giorgi Melia (GEO)	1
Alex Szőke (HUN)	4

Quarterfinals
Artur Aleksanyan (ARM)	5
Nikoloz Kakhelashvili (ITA)	2
Kiril Milov (BUL)	3
Alex Szőke (HUN)	3

Semifinals
Artur Aleksanyan (ARM)	1
Kiril Milov (BUL)	2

=== Bottom half ===
Round of 32
Kristian Lukač (CRO)	3
Alex Kessidis (SWE)	5
Artur Sargsian (UWW)	7
Tyrone Sterkenburg (NED)	7
Murad Ahmadiyev (AZE)	12
Beytullah Kayışdağ (TUR)	3
Kiryl Maskevich (UWW)	2
Markus Ragginger (AUT)	1

Round of 16
Lucas Lazogianis (GER)	WO
Alex Kessidis (SWE)
Tyrone Sterkenburg (NED)	6
Mathias Bak (DEN)	3
Mindaugas Venckaitis (LTU)	5
Murad Ahmadiyev (AZE)	5
Kiryl Maskevich (UWW)	8^{F}
Arvi Savolainen (FIN)	2

Quarterfinals
Lucas Lazogianis (GER)	3
Tyrone Sterkenburg (NED)	1
Mindaugas Venckaitis (LTU)	0
Kiryl Maskevich (UWW)	8

Semifinals
Lucas Lazogianis (GER)	5
Kiryl Maskevich (UWW)	1

=== Repechage ===
Repechage round 1
Nicu Ojog (ROU)	2
Artur Omarov (CZE)	8

Repechage round 2
Artur Omarov (CZE)	1
Alex Szőke (HUN)	5
Alex Kessidis (SWE)
Tyrone Sterkenburg (NED)	WO

Bronze medal match
Alex Szőke (HUN)	WO
Artur Aleksanyan (ARM)
Tyrone Sterkenburg (NED)	5
Kiryl Maskevich (UWW)	8

== Final standing ==
Rank	Athlete
1st place, gold medalist(s)	Kiril Milov (BUL)
2nd place, silver medalist(s)	Lucas Lazogianis (GER)
3rd place, bronze medalist(s)	Alex Szőke (HUN)
3rd place, bronze medalist(s)	Kiryl Maskevich (UWW)
5	Artur Aleksanyan (ARM)
5	Tyrone Sterkenburg (NED)
7	Nikoloz Kakhelashvili (ITA)
8	Murad Ahmadiyev (AZE)
9	Artur Omarov (CZE)
10	Giorgi Melia (GEO)
11	Alex Kessidis (SWE)
12	Mindaugas Venckaitis (LTU)
13	Artur Sargsian (UWW)
14	Kristian Lukač (CRO)
15	Mathias Bak (DEN)
16	Beytullah Kayışdağ (TUR)
17	Nicu Ojog (ROU)
18	Felix Baldauf (NOR)
19	Serhii Omelin (UKR)
20	Markus Ragginger (AUT)
21	Georgios Sotiriadis (GRE)
22	Richard Karelson (EST)
23	Arvi Savolainen (FIN)
