= 2026 World Wrestling Championships – Men's Greco-Roman 97 kg =

Wrestling competitions

Men's Greco-Roman 97 kg at the 2026 World Championships
- Venue: Barys Arena
- Dates: 25–26 October 2026
- Competitors: 28 from 28 nations

Medalists
gold medal	Kiryl Maskevich	Belarus
silver medal	Artur Sargsian	Russia
bronze medal	Kiril Milov	Bulgaria
bronze medal	Mohammad Hadi Saravi	Iran

The men's Greco-Roman 97 kilograms is a competition featured at the 2026 World Wrestling Championships, and was held in Astana, Kazakhstan on 25 and 26 October 2026.

This Greco-Roman wrestling competition consists of a single-elimination tournament, with a repechage used to determine the winner of two bronze medals. The two finalists face off for gold and silver medals. Each wrestler who loses to one of the two finalists moves into the repechage, culminating in a pair of bronze medal matches, featuring the semifinal losers each facing the remaining repechage opponent from their half of the bracket.

== Results ==
Legend

- F — Won by fall

=== Final ===
Final
Kiryl Maskevich (BLR)	7
Artur Sargsian (RUS)	1

=== Top half ===
Round of 32
Kiril Milov (BUL)	10
Vladlen Kozlyuk (UKR)	0
Mindaugas Venckaitis (LTU)	2
Uzur Dzhuzupbekov (KGZ)	2
Mohamed Ali Gabr (EGY)	1
Islam Yevloyev (KAZ)	5
Murad Ahmadiyev (AZE)	8
Kwon Jeong-bin (KOR)	0
Timothy Young (USA)	3
Matej Mandić (CRO)	4
Takahiro Tsuruda (JPN)	1
Markus Ragginger (AUT)	4

Round of 16
Alex Szőke (HUN)	2
Kiril Milov (BUL)	3
Mindaugas Venckaitis (LTU)	0
Islam Yevloyev (KAZ)	4
Murad Ahmadiyev (AZE)	8^{F}
Matej Mandić (CRO)	1
Markus Ragginger (AUT)	3
Kiryl Maskevich (BLR)	7

Quarterfinals
Kiril Milov (BUL)	3^{F}
Islam Yevloyev (KAZ)	0
Murad Ahmadiyev (AZE)	4
Kiryl Maskevich (BLR)	5

Semifinals
Kiril Milov (BUL)	5
Kiryl Maskevich (BLR)	7

=== Bottom half ===
Round of 32
Hayk Khloyan (ARM)	10
Hamza Boumadiene (MAR)	0
Mikheil Kajaia (SRB)	1
Roberti Kobliashvili (GEO)	3
Anton Vieweg (GER)	8
Nitesh Siwach (IND)	0
Wang Zegang (CHN)	11
Richard Karelson (EST)	1
Fadi Rouabah (ALG)	0
Alex Kessidis (SWE)	8
Ganbaataryn Gankhuyag (MGL)	3
İbrahim Tığcı (TUR)	5

Round of 16
Mohammad Hadi Saravi (IRI)	8
Hayk Khloyan (ARM)	0
Roberti Kobliashvili (GEO)	1
Anton Vieweg (GER)	1
Wang Zegang (CHN)	0
Alex Kessidis (SWE)	8
İbrahim Tığcı (TUR)	0
Artur Sargsian (RUS)	6

Quarterfinals
Mohammad Hadi Saravi (IRI)	5
Anton Vieweg (GER)	0
Alex Kessidis (SWE)	0
Artur Sargsian (RUS)	4

Semifinals
Mohammad Hadi Saravi (IRI)	1
Artur Sargsian (RUS)	5

=== Repechage ===
Repechage round 2
Markus Ragginger (AUT)	5
Murad Ahmadiyev (AZE)	1
İbrahim Tığcı (TUR)	0
Alex Kessidis (SWE)	6

Bronze medals
Markus Ragginger (AUT)	0
Kiril Milov (BUL)	10
Alex Kessidis (SWE)	0
Mohammad Hadi Saravi (IRI)	3

== Final standing ==
Rank	Athlete
1st place, gold medalist(s)	Kiryl Maskevich (BLR)
2nd place, silver medalist(s)	Artur Sargsian (RUS)
3rd place, bronze medalist(s)	Kiril Milov (BUL)
3rd place, bronze medalist(s)	Mohammad Hadi Saravi (IRI)
5	Markus Ragginger (AUT)
5	Alex Kessidis (SWE)
7	Murad Ahmadiyev (AZE)
8	Anton Vieweg (GER)
9	Islam Yevloyev (KAZ)
10	Wang Zegang (CHN)
11	Hayk Khloyan (ARM)
12	Roberti Kobliashvili (GEO)
13	Matej Mandić (CRO)
14	İbrahim Tığcı (TUR)
15	Mindaugas Venckaitis (LTU)
16	Timothy Young (USA)
17	Ganbaataryn Gankhuyag (MGL)
18	Uzur Dzhuzupbekov (KGZ)
19	Alex Szőke (HUN)
20	Mikheil Kajaia (SRB)
21	Takahiro Tsuruda (JPN)
22	Mohamed Ali Gabr (EGY)
23	Richard Karelson (EST)
24	Nitesh Siwach (IND)
25	Kwon Jeong-bin (KOR)
26	Fadi Rouabah (ALG)
27	Vladlen Kozlyuk (UKR)
28	Hamza Boumadiene (MAR)
