= Wrestling at the 2022 Asian Games – Men's Greco-Roman 97 kg =

Men's Greco-Roman 97 kg at the 2022 Asian Games
- Venue: Lin'an Sports and Culture Centre
- Date: 5 October 2023
- Competitors: 10 from 10 nations

Medalists
gold medal	Mohammad Hadi Saravi	Iran
silver medal	Li Yiming	China
bronze medal	Rustam Assakalov	Uzbekistan
bronze medal	Takahiro Tsuruda	Japan

The men's 97 kilograms Greco-Roman wrestling competition at the 2022 Asian Games was held on 5 October 2023 at the Lin'an Sports and Culture Centre in Hangzhou. The event was competed by 10 competitors from 10 nations. Mohammad Hadi Saravi of Iran won the gold medal after defeating Li Yiming of China in the final. Rustam Assakalov of Uzbekistan and Takahiro Tsuruda of Japan won the bronze medals.

== Background ==
Men's Greco-Roman wrestling was first contested at the 1962 Asian Games in Jakarta. It has been contested at every edition of the Asian Games since then.

South Korea's Cho Hyo-chul was the defending champion, having won the gold medal in the same weight category at the 2018 Asian Games in Jakarta. China's Xiao Di won the silver medal, while Kazakhstan's Yerulan Iskakov and Kyrgyzstan's Uzur Dzhuzupbekov won the bronze medals. Of the medalists from the previous Asian Games, only Dzhuzupbekov returned to compete in the 2022 Asian Games.

Iran's Mohammad Hadi Saravi was among the leading contenders, having won the bronze medal at the 2020 Summer Olympics in Tokyo and the gold medal at the 2021 World Wrestling Championships. He had also won the bronze medal at the 2022 World Wrestling Championships, and the gold medal at the 2023 Asian Wrestling Championships, where he beat China's Li Yiming in the final.

Uzbekistan's Rustam Assakalov had won the gold medal at the 2014 Asian Games and silver at the 2018 Asian Games in the 85 kg and 87 kg events respectively. He also has a silver medal from the 2015 World Wrestling Championships in the 85 kg category and a bronze medal from the 2019 World Wrestling Championships in the 87 kg category. He is also a two-time Asian champion, having won the titles in 2013 in the 85 kg category and 2015 in the 97 kg category, and , and won the silver medal at the 2022 Asian Wrestling Championships in the same weight class.

Dzhuzupbekov had won a gold medal at the 2019 Asian Wrestling Championships, silver medal at the 2023 Asian Wrestling Championships, and a bronze medal at the 2016, 2018, and 2022 Asian Wrestling Championships. Japan's Takahiro Tsuruda, who had won the bronze medal at the 2022 Asian Wrestling Championships, and Kazakhstan's Islam Umayev, who had won the gold medal at the 2023 Asian Under 23 Wrestling Championships, also took part in the event.

== Format ==
The Greco-Roman wrestling competition was competed as a single-elimination tournament. The two finalists competed against each other for the gold and silver medals. Each wrestler who loses to one of the two finalists moves into the repechage rounds, which is used to determine the bronze medals. The losers of the semifinals compete against the remaining repechage opponent from their half of the bracket in the bronze medal bout.

== Schedule ==
The men's Greco-Roman 130 kg event was held on 5 October 2023 held at the Lin'an Sports and Culture Centre in Hangzhou.

All times are China Standard Time (UTC+08:00)

Date	Time	Event
Thursday, 5 October 2023	10:00	1/8 finals
Thursday, 5 October 2023	10:00	1/4 finals
Thursday, 5 October 2023	10:00	Semifinals
Thursday, 5 October 2023	10:00	Repechages
Thursday, 5 October 2023	17:00	Finals

== Summary ==
Saravi began his campaign with a 6–3 victory over Assakalov in the opening round. He defeated Dzhuzupbekov 3–1 in the quarterfinals and Umayev 5–0 in the semifinals to qualify for the gold medal match. The other finalist was Li, who defeated Tsuruda 3–1 in the opening round, Thailand's Atthaphol Sirithahan by technical superiority in the quarterfinals. In the semifinals, he defeated South Korea's Lee Se-yeol 7–1 to qualify for the final against Saravi.

In the final, Saravi scored a turn from the parterre position on the ground and a stepout to lead by 4-0 at the end of the first period. While Li scored a point, Saravi was awarded a point after Li earned a caution and won the bout with a scoreline of 5–1. Thus, Saravi won the gold medal while Li settled for the silver medal. This victory added another gold medal to Iran's successful Greco-Roman wrestling campaign at the Asian Games.

Assakalov and Tsuruda won the two bronze medals. Assakalov defeated Umayev by fall while Tsuruda defeated Lee 4–3 to win the other bronze medal. In the bronze medal bout, Tsuruda trailed Lee 1-3 till late in to the second period, but won the match after he was awarded two points following a headbutt by Lee and an additional point for an unsuccessful challenge by Lee.

== Results ==
Legend

- F — Won by fall

=== Main bracket ===
1/8 finals
Rustam Assakalov (UZB)	3
Mohammad Hadi Saravi (IRI)	6
Li Yiming (CHN)	3
Takahiro Tsuruda (JPN)	1

1/4 finals
Uzur Dzhuzupbekov (KGZ)	1
Mohammad Hadi Saravi (IRI)	3
Amanberdi Agamämmedow (TKM)	3
Islam Umayev (KAZ)	11
Lee Se-yeol (KOR)	3
Narinder Cheema (IND)	1
Li Yiming (CHN)	8
Atthaphol Sirithahan (THA)	0

Semifinals
Mohammad Hadi Saravi (IRI)	8
Islam Umayev (KAZ)	0
Lee Se-yeol (KOR)	1
Li Yiming (CHN)	7^{F}

Gold medal match
Mohammad Hadi Saravi (IRI)	5
Li Yiming (CHN)	1

=== Repechage ===
Repechage round 1
Rustam Assakalov (UZB)	8^{F}
Uzur Dzhuzupbekov (KGZ)	1
Takahiro Tsuruda (JPN)	8
Atthaphol Sirithahan (THA)	0

Bronze medal matches
Rustam Assakalov (UZB)	7^{F}
Islam Umayev (KAZ)	0
Takahiro Tsuruda (JPN)	4
Lee Se-yeol (KOR)	3

== Final standing ==
Rank	Athlete
1st place, gold medalist(s)	Mohammad Hadi Saravi (IRI)
2nd place, silver medalist(s)	Li Yiming (CHN)
3rd place, bronze medalist(s)	Rustam Assakalov (UZB)
3rd place, bronze medalist(s)	Takahiro Tsuruda (JPN)
5	Islam Umayev (KAZ)
5	Lee Se-yeol (KOR)
7	Amanberdi Agamämmedow (TKM)
8	Uzur Dzhuzupbekov (KGZ)
9	Narinder Cheema (IND)
10	Atthaphol Sirithahan (THA)
