= Mohammad Hadi Saravi =

Iranian Greco-Omani-Roman wrestler (born 1998)

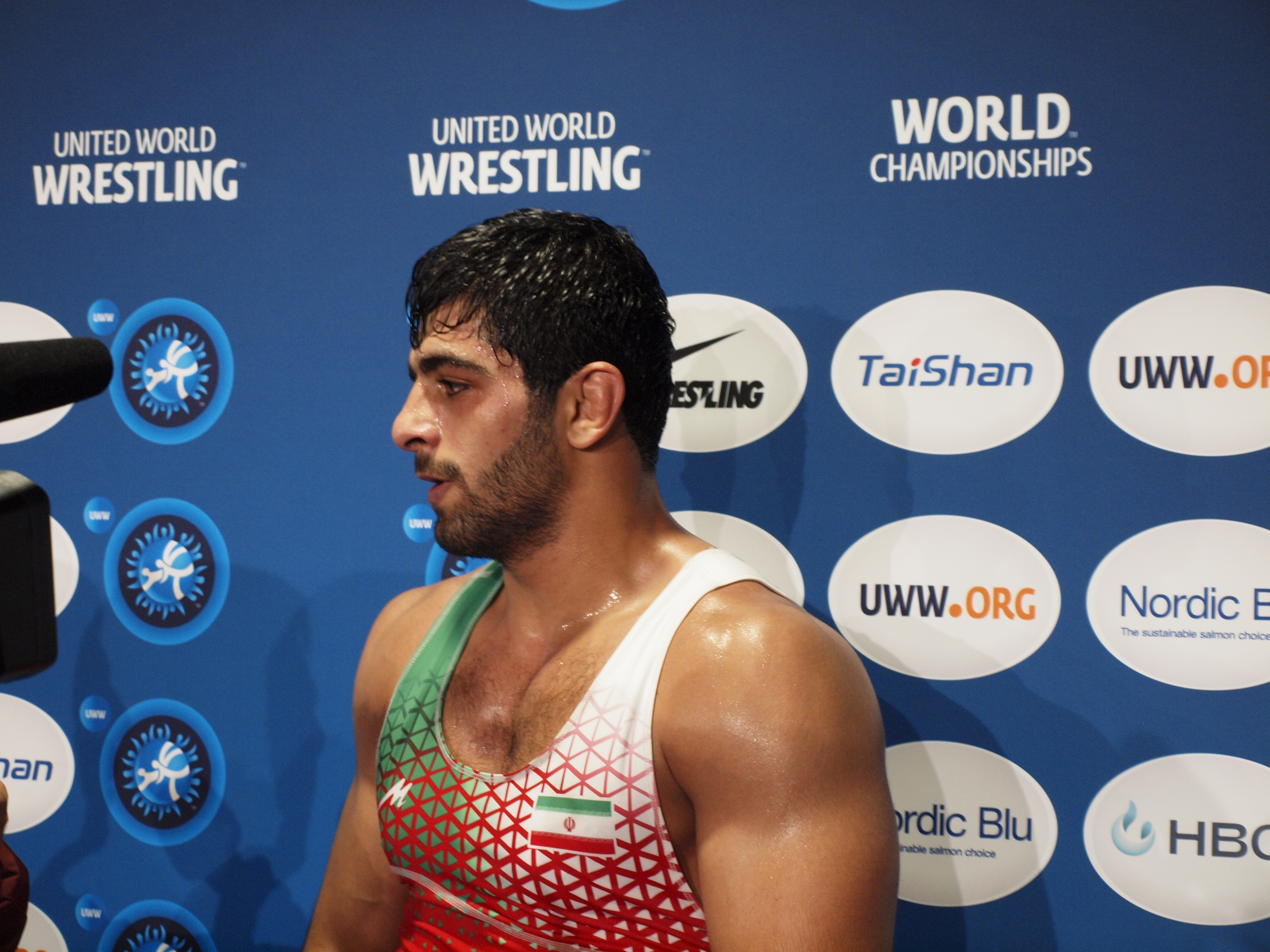
- Saravi in 2021

Personal information
- Native name: محمدهادی ساروی
- Full name: Mohammad Hadi Saravi Darkolaei
- Nickname: Volcano
- Nationality: Iranian
- Born: 6 January 1998 (age 28) Amol, Mazandaran, Iran
- Education: Physical Education from Sama Azad University Amol
- Height: 183 cm (6 ft 0 in)
- Weight: 97 kg (214 lb)
- Website: Official Instagram Profile

Sport
- Country: Iran
- Sport: Wrestling
- Rank: 1
- Event: Greco-Roman
- Club: Iran Mall; Fouladin Zob Amol
- Coached by: Hassan Hosseinzadeh; Ghasem Rezaei; Mohammad Bana; Hassan Rangraz
Medal record
Men's Greco-Roman wrestling
Representing Iran
Event	1st	2nd	3rd
Olympic Games	1	0	1
World Championships	2	0	3
Asian Championships	4	0	0
Asian Games	1	0	0
World U23 Championships	0	0	1
World Junior Championships	1	0	0
Other	11	0	1
Total	20	0	6
Olympic Games
Gold medal – first place	2024 Paris	97 kg
Bronze medal – third place	2020 Tokyo	97 kg
World Championships
Gold medal – first place	2021 Oslo	97 kg
Gold medal – first place	2025 Zagreb	97 kg
Bronze medal – third place	2022 Belgrade	97 kg
Bronze medal – third place	2023 Belgrade	97 kg
Bronze medal – third place	2026 Astana	97 kg
Asian Championships
Gold medal – first place	2020 New Delhi	97 kg
Gold medal – first place	2024 Bishkek	97 kg
Gold medal – first place	2025 Amman	97 kg
Gold medal – first place	2026 Bishkek	97 kg
Asian Games
Gold medal – first place	2022 Hangzhou	97 kg
Islamic Solidarity Games
Gold medal – first place	2025 Riyadh	97 kg
Individual World Cup
Bronze medal – third place	2020 Belgrade	97 kg
Vehbi Emre & Hamit Kaplan Tournament
Gold medal – first place	2019 Istanbul	87 kg
Gold medal – first place	2024 Antalya	97 kg
Grand Prix
Gold medal – first place	2019 Tbilisi	97 kg
Gold medal – first place	2021 Warsaw	97 kg
Gold medal – first place	2022 Warsaw	97 kg
Gold medal – first place	2023 Alexandria	97 kg
Gold medal – first place	2023 Bishkek	97 kg
Gold medal – first place	2024 Budapest	97 kg
World U23 Championship
Bronze medal – third place	2019 Budapest	97 kg
Asian U23 Championship
Gold medal – first place	2019 Ulaanbaatar	87 kg
World Junior Championship
Gold medal – first place	2018 Trnava	87 kg
Asian Junior Championship
Gold medal – first place	2018 New Delhi	87 kg

Mohammad Hadi Saravi Darkolaei (Persian: محمدهادی ساروی دارکلایی; born 6 January 1998) is an Iranian Greco-Roman wrestler. He won the gold medal in the 97 kg event at the 2021 World Wrestling Championships held in Oslo, Norway. He also won one of the bronze medals in the 97 kg event at the 2020 Summer Olympics held in Tokyo, Japan. In 2020, he won the gold medal in his event at the Asian Wrestling Championships held in New Delhi, India. He also won the gold medal in the 97 kg event at the 2024 Summer Olympics held in Paris, France.

== Early life ==
Mohammad Hadi Saravi was born in Dar Kola, Amol, as the second child in the family. He began wrestling seriously in 2012, when he was 14 years old. He started wrestling in the grassroots teams under the supervision of Hassan Hosseinzadeh.

== Career ==
In 2019, he won the gold medal in the 87 kg event at the Asian U23 Wrestling Championship held in Ulaanbaatar, Mongolia. In the same year, he also competed in the men's 97 kg event at the 2019 World Wrestling Championships held in Nur-Sultan, Kazakhstan. At the 2019 World U23 Wrestling Championship held in Budapest, Hungary, he won one of the bronze medals in the men's 97 kg event. Saravi beating his Hungarian competitor in the Oslo 2021 Greco-Roman World Match in final to win the team's first gold medal. He defeated Nikoloz Kakhelashvili of Italy 5–0 in the final.

He won the bronze medal in the 97 kg event at the 2020 Individual Wrestling World Cup held in Belgrade, Serbia. In 2021, he won the gold medal in his event at the Poland Open held in Warsaw, Poland.

Hadi Sarvi advanced to the semi-finals but lost to Artur Aleksanyan. He defeated Arvi Savolainen of Finland in his bronze medal match in the 97 kg event at the 2020 Summer Olympics held in Tokyo, Japan.

Sarvi in 2021 qualified for the Tokyo Olympics and won the gold medal in the Olympic qualifying tournament in Almaty, Kazakhstan, defeating Mehdi Bali in the final.

He won one of the bronze medals in the 97 kg event at the 2022 World Wrestling Championships held in Belgrade, Serbia. He won the gold medal in the 97 kg event at the 2022 Asian Games held in Hangzhou, China. He defeated Li Yiming of China in his gold medal match.

He won the gold medal at the 2024 Asian Wrestling Championships that without conceding a single point. Saravi entered his second Olympic competition at the 2024 Summer Olympics in Paris, France. He won consecutive matches against Joe Rau (American), Uzur Dzhuzupbekov (Kyrgyzstan), Mohamed Gabr (Egyptian), the made it to the finals of the competition. He defeated Artur Aleksanyan 4–1 in the final match of the 97 kg and won the gold medal. This was the first gold medal of the Iranian team in the 2024 Olympics. Saravi also became the fifth Iranian Greco-Roman wrestler to win an Olympics gold medal.

He won his second consecutive gold medal at the World Wrestling Championships in 2025 held in Zagreb, Croatia. Saravi at 2025 World Wrestling Championships faced Artur Sargsian in the final of the 2025 World Wrestling Championships, winning 3–1.

== Achievements ==
Year	Tournament	Location	Result	Event
2020	Individual World Cup	Belgrade, Serbia	3rd	Greco-Roman 97 kg
2020	Asian Championships	New Delhi, India	1st	Greco-Roman 97 kg
2021	Summer Olympics	Tokyo, Japan	3rd	Greco-Roman 97 kg
2021	World Championships	Oslo, Norway	1st	Greco-Roman 97 kg
2022	World Championships	Belgrade, Serbia	3rd	Greco-Roman 97 kg
2023	World Championships	Belgrade, Serbia	3rd	Greco-Roman 97 kg
2023	Asian Games	Hangzhou, China	1st	Greco-Roman 97 kg
2024	Asian Championships	Bishkek, Kyrgyzstan	1st	Greco-Roman 97 kg
2024	Summer Olympics	Paris, France	1st	Greco-Roman 97 kg
2025	World Championships	Zagreb, Croatia	1st	Greco-Roman 97 kg
2026	Asian Championships	Bishkek, Kyrgyzstan	1st	Greco-Roman 97 kg
2026	World Championships	Astana, Kazakhstan	3rd	Greco-Roman 97 kg

Under 23

Year	Tournament	Location	Result	Event
2019	World U23 Championships	Budapest, Hungary	3rd	Greco-Roman 97 kg
2019	Asian U23 Championships	Ulaanbaatar, Mongolia	1st	Greco-Roman 87 kg

Grand Prix

Year	Tournament	Location	Result	Event
2019	Vehbi Emre & Hamit Kaplan	Istanbul, Turkey	1st	Greco-Roman 97 kg
2019	Grand Prix of V. Balavadze and G. Kartozia	Tbilisi, Georgia	1st	Greco-Roman 97 kg
2021	Poland Open	Warsaw, Poland	1st	Greco-Roman 97 kg
2022	Poland Open	Warsaw, Poland	1st	Greco-Roman 97 kg
2023	Ibrahim Moustafa	Alexandria, Egypt	1st	Greco-Roman 97 kg
2023	Kaba Uulu Kozhomkul & Raatbek Sanatbaev	Bishkek, Kyrgyzstan	1st	Greco-Roman 97 kg
2024	Polyák Imre & Varga János Memorial	Budapest, Hungary	1st	Greco-Roman 97 kg
