= 2025 World Wrestling Championships – Men's Greco-Roman 97 kg =

Wrestling competitions

Men's Greco-Roman 97 kg at the 2025 World Championships
- Venue: Arena Zagreb
- Dates: 19–20 September 2025
- Competitors: 29 from 27 nations

Medalists
gold medal	Mohammad Hadi Saravi	Iran
silver medal	Artur Sargsian
bronze medal	Kiryl Maskevich
bronze medal	Murad Ahmadiyev	Azerbaijan

The men's Greco-Roman 97 kilograms is a competition featured at the 2025 World Wrestling Championships, and was held in Zagreb, Croatia on 19 and 20 September 2025.

This Greco-Roman wrestling competition consists of a single-elimination tournament, with a repechage used to determine the winner of two bronze medals. The two finalists face off for gold and silver medals. Each wrestler who loses to one of the two finalists moves into the repechage, culminating in a pair of bronze medal matches, featuring the semifinal losers each facing the remaining repechage opponent from their half of the bracket.

== Results ==
Legend

- F — Won by fall
- R — Retired

=== Final ===
Final
Mohammad Hadi Saravi (IRI)	3
Artur Sargsian (UWW)	1

=== Top half ===
Round of 32
Filip Smetko (CRO)	2
Nitesh Siwach (IND)	3
Michial Foy (USA)	4
Mindaugas Venckaitis (LTU)	0
Rakhat Berzhanov (KAZ)	2
Giorgi Melia (GEO)	7
Arvi Savolainen (FIN)	1
Kiryl Maskevich (UWW)	8
Amanberdi Agamämmedow (TKM)	0
Vladlen Kozlyuk (UKR)	8
Lee Min-ho (KOR)	0
Richard Karelson (EST)	7
Aleksandar Stjepanetic (SWE)	0
Gabriel Rosillo (CUB)	8

Round of 16
Mohammad Hadi Saravi (IRI)	4
Nitesh Siwach (IND)	0
Michial Foy (USA)	0
Giorgi Melia (GEO)	9
Kiryl Maskevich (UWW)	6
Vladlen Kozlyuk (UKR)	5
Richard Karelson (EST)	0
Gabriel Rosillo (CUB)	9

Quarterfinals
Mohammad Hadi Saravi (IRI)	1
Giorgi Melia (GEO)	1
Kiryl Maskevich (UWW)	7
Gabriel Rosillo (CUB)	4

Semifinals
Mohammad Hadi Saravi (IRI)	3
Kiryl Maskevich (UWW)	1

=== Bottom half ===
Round of 32
Artur Omarov (CZE)	3
Yuri Nakazato (JPN)	0
Artur Sargsian (UWW)	9
Markus Ragginger (AUT)	0
Gerard Kurniczak (POL)	1
Lucas Lazogianis (GER)	3
Uzur Dzhuzupbekov (KGZ)	3
Mohamed Ali Gabr (EGY)	2
Nikoloz Kakhelashvili (ITA)	1^{R}
Murad Ahmadiyev (AZE)	4
Abdul Kadir Çebi (TUR)	1
Wang Zegang (CHN)	3^{F}

Round of 16
Alex Szőke (HUN)	1
Artur Omarov (CZE)	1
Artur Sargsian (UWW)	1
Lucas Lazogianis (GER)	1
Uzur Dzhuzupbekov (KGZ)	1
Murad Ahmadiyev (AZE)	5
Wang Zegang (CHN)	1
Artur Aleksanyan (ARM)	5

Quarterfinals
Alex Szőke (HUN)	1
Artur Sargsian (UWW)	1
Murad Ahmadiyev (AZE)	3^{F}
Artur Aleksanyan (ARM)	3

Semifinals
Artur Sargsian (UWW)	1
Murad Ahmadiyev (AZE)	1

=== Repechage ===
Repechage round 1
Markus Ragginger (AUT)	1
Lucas Lazogianis (GER)	7

Repechage round 2
Nitesh Siwach (IND)	4
Giorgi Melia (GEO)	5
Lucas Lazogianis (GER)	2
Alex Szőke (HUN)	3

Bronze medals
Giorgi Melia (GEO)	1
Kiryl Maskevich (UWW)	5^{F}
Alex Szőke (HUN)	5
Murad Ahmadiyev (AZE)	5

== Final standing ==
Rank	Athlete
1st place, gold medalist(s)	Mohammad Hadi Saravi (IRI)
2nd place, silver medalist(s)	Artur Sargsian (UWW)
3rd place, bronze medalist(s)	Kiryl Maskevich (UWW)
3rd place, bronze medalist(s)	Murad Ahmadiyev (AZE)
5	Giorgi Melia (GEO)
5	Alex Szőke (HUN)
7	Gabriel Rosillo (CUB)
8	Lucas Lazogianis (GER)
9	Wang Zegang (CHN)
10	Vladlen Kozlyuk (UKR)
11	Nitesh Siwach (IND)
12	Artur Omarov (CZE)
13	Uzur Dzhuzupbekov (KGZ)
14	Artur Aleksanyan (ARM)
15	Richard Karelson (EST)
16	Michial Foy (USA)
17	Filip Smetko (CRO)
18	Mohamed Ali Gabr (EGY)
19	Rakhat Berzhanov (KAZ)
20	Gerard Kurniczak (POL)
21	Arvi Savolainen (FIN)
22	Markus Ragginger (AUT)
23	Abdul Kadir Çebi (TUR)
24	Nikoloz Kakhelashvili (ITA)
25	Yuri Nakazato (JPN)
26	Mindaugas Venckaitis (LTU)
27	Lee Min-ho (KOR)
28	Amanberdi Agamämmedow (TKM)
29	Aleksandar Stjepanetic (SWE)
