= 2021 U23 World Wrestling Championships – Men's Greco-Roman 97 kg =

Greco-Roman event at World Wrestling Championship

The men's Greco-Roman 97 kilograms is a competition featured at the 2021 U23 World Wrestling Championships, and was held in Belgrade, Serbia on 2 and 3 November.

== Medalists ==
Gold	Artur Sargsian (RUS)
Silver	Pavel Hlinchuk (BLR)
Bronze	Arvi Savolainen (FIN)
Bronze	Markus Ragginger (AUT)

== Results ==
Legend

- F — Won by fall

=== Final ===
Final
Pavel Hlinchuk (BLR)	0
Artur Sargsian (RUS)	9

=== Top half ===
Round of 32
Luca Svaicari (ITA)	1
Albert Yeghikyan (ARM)	9

Round of 16
Beytullah Kayışdağ (TUR)	5
Giorgi Katsanashvil (GEO)	5
Deepanshu Ahlawat (IND)	0
Róbert Érsek (HUN)	8
Arvi Savolainen (FIN)	3
Richard Karelson (EST)	1
Pavel Hlinchuk (BLR)	11
Albert Yeghikyan (ARM)	2

Quarterfinals
Beytullah Kayışdağ (TUR)	1
Róbert Érsek (HUN)	1
Arvi Savolainen (FIN)	5
Pavel Hlinchuk (BLR)	8

Semifinals
Róbert Érsek (HUN)	4
Pavel Hlinchuk (BLR)	4^{F}

=== Bottom half ===
Round of 32
Nicholas Boykin (USA)	8
Gerard Kurniczak (POL)	3
Ondřej Dadák (CZE)	0
Artur Sargsian (RUS)	11
Daniiar Sherimbekov (KGZ)	1
Magriot Marinov (BUL)	7^{F}
Marcus Worren (NOR)	0
Michail Iosifidis (GRE)	6
Markus Ragginger (AUT)	3
Morteza Alghosi (IRI)	1
Aleksandar Simović (SRB)	2
Damian von Euw (SUI)	11
Patrick Neumaier (GER)	8
Daulet Dossybayev (KAZ)	0
Oleksandr Yevdokimov (UKR)	7
Arnoldas Baranovas (LTU)	4

Round of 16
Nicholas Boykin (USA)	0
Artur Sargsian (RUS)	11
Magriot Marinov (BUL)	0
Michail Iosifidis (GRE)	8
Markus Ragginger (AUT)	7
Damian von Euw (SUI)	0
Patrick Neumaier (GER)	4
Oleksandr Yevdokimov (UKR)	0

Quarterfinals
Artur Sargsian (RUS)	8
Michail Iosifidis (GRE)	0
Markus Ragginger (AUT)	3
Patrick Neumaier (GER)	1

Semifinals
Artur Sargsian (RUS)	3
Markus Ragginger (AUT)	1

=== Repechage ===
Repechage round 1
Ondřej Dadák (CZE)	4
Nicholas Boykin (USA)	3

Repechage round 2
Albert Yeghikyan (ARM)	0
Arvi Savolainen (FIN)	8
Ondřej Dadák (CZE)	7
Michail Iosifidis (GRE)	6

Bronze medals
Arvi Savolainen (FIN)	5
Róbert Érsek (HUN)	1
Ondřej Dadák (CZE)	0
Markus Ragginger (AUT)	5
