= 2020 Individual Wrestling World Cup – Men's Greco-Roman 97 kg =

The Men's Greco-Roman 97 kg is a competition featured at the 2020 Individual Wrestling World Cup, and was held in Belgrade, Serbia on 13 and 14 December 2020.

== Medalists ==
Gold	Musa Evloev; Russia
Silver	Alex Szőke; Hungary
Bronze	Artur Omarov; Czech Republic
Bronze	Mohammad Hadi Saravi; Iran

== Results ==
Legend

- F — Won by fall
- R — Retired
- WO — Won by walkover

1/16 finals
	Score	
Artur Aleksanyan (ARM)	1–5	Musa Evloev (RUS)

1/8 finals
Artur Omarov (CZE)	9
Aliaksandr Hrabovik (BLR)	0
Mikheil Kajaia (SRB)	2
Mélonin Noumonvi (FRA)	4^{F}
Michail Iosifidis (GRE)	0
Alex Szőke (HUN)	9
Uzur Dzhuzupbekov (KGZ)	9
Adem Boudjemline (ALG)	0
Mohammad Hadi Saravi (IRI)	9
Hardeep Singh (IND)	1
Nikoloz Kakhelashvili (ITA)	2
Vladlen Kozlyuk (UKR)	0
Süleyman Demirci (TUR)	0
Kiril Milov (BUL)	9
~~Damian von Euw (SUI)~~
Musa Evloev (RUS)	WO

Quarterfinals
Artur Omarov (CZE)	WO
Mélonin Noumonvi (FRA)
Alex Szőke (HUN)	4
Uzur Dzhuzupbekov (KGZ)	3
Mohammad Hadi Saravi (IRI)	2
Nikoloz Kakhelashvili (ITA)	1
Kiril Milov (BUL)	0
Musa Evloev (RUS)	3

Semifinals
Artur Omarov (CZE)	0
Alex Szőke (HUN)	4
Mohammad Hadi Saravi (IRI)	3
Musa Evloev (RUS)	5

Final
Alex Szőke (HUN)	0
Musa Evloev (RUS)	3

Repechage round 1
Artur Aleksanyan (ARM)	WO
Damian von Euw (SUI)

Repechage round 2
Michail Iosifidis (GRE)	2^{R}
Uzur Dzhuzupbekov (KGZ)	4
~~Damian von Euw (SUI)~~
Kiril Milov (BUL)	WO

Bronze medals
Uzur Dzhuzupbekov (KGZ)	1
Artur Omarov (CZE)	4
Kiril Milov (BUL)	0
Mohammad Hadi Saravi (IRI)	3
