= Li Yiming =

Chinese Greco-Roman wrestler

Personal information
- Native name: 李一鸣
- Born: 6 June 1998 (age 28) Yunyang County, Chongqing, China
- Education: Wuhan Sports University
- Height: 185 cm (6 ft 1 in)
- Weight: 97 kg (214 lb; 15 st 4 lb)

Sport
- Country: China
- Sport: Amateur wrestling
- Weight class: 97 kg
- Event: Greco-Roman
Medal record
Men's Greco-Roman wrestling
Representing China
Asian Games
Silver medal – second place	2022 Hangzhou	97 kg
Grand Prix
Silver medal – second place	2023 Bishkek	97 kg
National Games of China
Silver medal – second place	2021 Shaanxi	97 kg

Li Yiming (Chinese: 李一鸣, born 6 June 1998) is a Chinese Greco-Roman wrestler. He won a silver medal in the 97 kg event at the 2022 Asian Games.

== Background ==
Li was born in Yuntang County, Chongqing province.

He started training in wrestling in 2012.

== Career ==
In September 2021, Li won a silver medal in the 97 kg event at the 2021 National Games of China.

In June 2023, Li participated in the 2023 Kaba Uulu Kozhomkul & Raatbek Sanatbaev Tournament and won a silver medal in the 97 kg event after losing the final match to Mohammad Hadi Saravi.

In October 2023, Li participated in the 2022 Asian Games and won a silver medal in the 97 kg event after losing the final match to Saravi again.

He competed at the 2024 Asian Wrestling Olympic Qualification Tournament in Bishkek, Kyrgyzstan hoping to qualify for the 2024 Summer Olympics in Paris, France. He was eliminated in his first match and he did not qualify for the Olympics.
