= 2021 World Wrestling Championships =

17th edition of the combined events

- Host city: Oslo, Norway
- Dates: 2–10 October 2021
- Stadium: Nye Jordal Amfi

Champions
- Freestyle: RWF
- Greco-Roman: RWF
- Women: Japan

The 2021 World Wrestling Championships was the 17th edition of the World Wrestling Championships of combined events and was held from 2 to 10 October 2021 in Oslo, Norway.

The event was subsequent to the 2019 World Championships due to the cancelation of the 2020 edition during the COVID-19 pandemic. The 2020 Individual World Cup was held as replacement for the World Wrestling Championships.

== Medal table ==
Rank	Nation	Gold	Silver	Bronze	Total
1	Iran	7	3	3	13
2	United States	5	5	5	15
3	Japan	5	3	4	12
4	Russian Wrestling Federation	4	5	9	18
5	Kyrgyzstan	2	2	2	6
6	Moldova	2	1	0	3
7	Azerbaijan	1	1	4	6
8	Poland	1	0	3	4
9	Armenia	1	0	1	2
9	Belarus	1	0	1	2
11	Bulgaria	1	0	0	1
12	Georgia	0	3	5	8
13	Germany	0	1	3	4
13	Turkey	0	1	3	4
15	India	0	1	1	2
15	Kazakhstan	0	1	1	2
17	Estonia	0	1	0	1
17	Hungary	0	1	0	1
17	Slovakia	0	1	0	1
20	Mongolia	0	0	6	6
21	Ukraine	0	0	3	3
22	Canada	0	0	1	1
22	Denmark	0	0	1	1
22	Egypt	0	0	1	1
22	Lithuania	0	0	1	1
22	Norway	0	0	1	1
22	Sweden	0	0	1	1
Totals (27 entries)		30	30	60	120

== Team ranking ==
Rank	Men's freestyle		Men's Greco-Roman		Women's freestyle	
Rank	Team	Points	Team	Points	Team	Points
1	Russian Wrestling Federation	173	Russian Wrestling Federation	152	Japan	196
2	United States	168	Iran	146	United States	147
3	Iran	162	Azerbaijan	107	Mongolia	78
4	Georgia	68	Georgia	97	Ukraine	73
5	Turkey	58	Turkey	68	India	67
6	Mongolia	56	Hungary	60	Kyrgyzstan	65
7	Belarus	45	Japan	54	Russian Wrestling Federation	64
8	Azerbaijan	42	Armenia	51	Bulgaria	49
9	Poland	39	Poland	46	Canada	47
10	Armenia	39	Belarus	45	Moldova	45

== Medal summary ==
=== Men's freestyle ===
Weight	Gold	Silver	Bronze
57 kg	Thomas Gilman; United States	Alireza Sarlak; Iran	Horst Lehr; Germany
57 kg	Thomas Gilman; United States	Alireza Sarlak; Iran	Aryan Tsiutryn; Belarus
61 kg	Abasgadzhi Magomedov; Russian Wrestling Federation	Daton Fix; United States	Arsen Harutyunyan; Armenia
61 kg	Abasgadzhi Magomedov; Russian Wrestling Federation	Daton Fix; United States	Toshihiro Hasegawa; Japan
65 kg	Zagir Shakhiev; Russian Wrestling Federation	Amir Mohammad Yazdani; Iran	Alibek Osmonov; Kyrgyzstan
65 kg	Zagir Shakhiev; Russian Wrestling Federation	Amir Mohammad Yazdani; Iran	Tömör-Ochiryn Tulga; Mongolia
70 kg	Magomedmurad Gadzhiev; Poland	Ernazar Akmataliev; Kyrgyzstan	Yevgeny Zherbaev; Russian Wrestling Federation
70 kg	Magomedmurad Gadzhiev; Poland	Ernazar Akmataliev; Kyrgyzstan	Zurabi Iakobishvili; Georgia
74 kg	Kyle Dake; United States	Tajmuraz Salkazanov; Slovakia	Fazlı Eryılmaz; Turkey
74 kg	Kyle Dake; United States	Tajmuraz Salkazanov; Slovakia	Timur Bizhoev; Russian Wrestling Federation
79 kg	Jordan Burroughs; United States	Mohammad Nokhodi; Iran	Radik Valiev; Russian Wrestling Federation
79 kg	Jordan Burroughs; United States	Mohammad Nokhodi; Iran	Nika Kentchadze; Georgia
86 kg	Hassan Yazdani; Iran	David Taylor; United States	Abubakr Abakarov; Azerbaijan
86 kg	Hassan Yazdani; Iran	David Taylor; United States	Artur Naifonov; Russian Wrestling Federation
92 kg	Kamran Ghasempour; Iran	Magomed Kurbanov; Russian Wrestling Federation	Osman Nurmagomedov; Azerbaijan
92 kg	Kamran Ghasempour; Iran	Magomed Kurbanov; Russian Wrestling Federation	J'den Cox; United States
97 kg	Abdulrashid Sadulaev; Russian Wrestling Federation	Kyle Snyder; United States	Mahamed Zakariiev; Ukraine
97 kg	Abdulrashid Sadulaev; Russian Wrestling Federation	Kyle Snyder; United States	Mojtaba Goleij; Iran
125 kg	Amir Hossein Zare; Iran	Geno Petriashvili; Georgia	Mönkhtöriin Lkhagvagerel; Mongolia
125 kg	Amir Hossein Zare; Iran	Geno Petriashvili; Georgia	Taha Akgül; Turkey

=== Men's Greco-Roman ===
Event	Gold	Silver	Bronze
55 kg	Ken Matsui; Japan	Emin Sefershaev; Russian Wrestling Federation	Nugzari Tsurtsumia; Georgia
55 kg	Ken Matsui; Japan	Emin Sefershaev; Russian Wrestling Federation	Eldaniz Azizli; Azerbaijan
60 kg	Victor Ciobanu; Moldova	Zholaman Sharshenbekov; Kyrgyzstan	Stepan Maryanyan; Russian Wrestling Federation
60 kg	Victor Ciobanu; Moldova	Zholaman Sharshenbekov; Kyrgyzstan	Murad Mammadov; Azerbaijan
63 kg	Meisam Dalkhani; Iran	Leri Abuladze; Georgia	Kensuke Shimizu; Japan
63 kg	Meisam Dalkhani; Iran	Leri Abuladze; Georgia	Lenur Temirov; Ukraine
67 kg	Mohammad Reza Geraei; Iran	Nazir Abdullaev; Russian Wrestling Federation	Ramaz Zoidze; Georgia
67 kg	Mohammad Reza Geraei; Iran	Nazir Abdullaev; Russian Wrestling Federation	Almat Kebispayev; Kazakhstan
72 kg	Malkhas Amoyan; Armenia	Sergey Kutuzov; Russian Wrestling Federation	Gevorg Sahakyan; Poland
72 kg	Malkhas Amoyan; Armenia	Sergey Kutuzov; Russian Wrestling Federation	Kristupas Šleiva; Lithuania
77 kg	Roman Vlasov; Russian Wrestling Federation	Sanan Suleymanov; Azerbaijan	Roland Schwarz; Germany
77 kg	Roman Vlasov; Russian Wrestling Federation	Sanan Suleymanov; Azerbaijan	Mohammad Ali Geraei; Iran
82 kg	Rafig Huseynov; Azerbaijan	Burhan Akbudak; Turkey	Adlan Akiev; Russian Wrestling Federation
82 kg	Rafig Huseynov; Azerbaijan	Burhan Akbudak; Turkey	Pejman Poshtam; Iran
87 kg	Kiryl Maskevich; Belarus	Lasha Gobadze; Georgia	Turpal Bisultanov; Denmark
87 kg	Kiryl Maskevich; Belarus	Lasha Gobadze; Georgia	Arkadiusz Kułynycz; Poland
97 kg	Mohammad Hadi Saravi; Iran	Alex Szőke; Hungary	Artur Sargsian; Russian Wrestling Federation
97 kg	Mohammad Hadi Saravi; Iran	Alex Szőke; Hungary	G'Angelo Hancock; United States
130 kg	Ali Akbar Yousefi; Iran	Zurabi Gedekhauri; Russian Wrestling Federation	Iakobi Kajaia; Georgia
130 kg	Ali Akbar Yousefi; Iran	Zurabi Gedekhauri; Russian Wrestling Federation	Oskar Marvik; Norway

=== Women's freestyle ===
Event	Gold	Silver	Bronze
50 kg	Remina Yoshimoto; Japan	Sarah Hildebrandt; United States	Nadezhda Sokolova; Russian Wrestling Federation
50 kg	Remina Yoshimoto; Japan	Sarah Hildebrandt; United States	Dolgorjavyn Otgonjargal; Mongolia
53 kg	Akari Fujinami; Japan	Iulia Leorda; Moldova	Katarzyna Krawczyk; Poland
53 kg	Akari Fujinami; Japan	Iulia Leorda; Moldova	Samantha Stewart; Canada
55 kg	Tsugumi Sakurai; Japan	Nina Hemmer; Germany	Oleksandra Khomenets; Ukraine
55 kg	Tsugumi Sakurai; Japan	Nina Hemmer; Germany	Jenna Burkert; United States
57 kg	Helen Maroulis; United States	Anshu Malik; India	Sae Nanjo; Japan
57 kg	Helen Maroulis; United States	Anshu Malik; India	Erkhembayaryn Davaachimeg; Mongolia
59 kg	Bilyana Dudova; Bulgaria	Akie Hanai; Japan	Baatarjavyn Shoovdor; Mongolia
59 kg	Bilyana Dudova; Bulgaria	Akie Hanai; Japan	Sarita Mor; India
62 kg	Aisuluu Tynybekova; Kyrgyzstan	Kayla Miracle; United States	Nonoka Ozaki; Japan
62 kg	Aisuluu Tynybekova; Kyrgyzstan	Kayla Miracle; United States	Enkhbatyn Gantuyaa; Mongolia
65 kg	Irina Rîngaci; Moldova	Miwa Morikawa; Japan	Johanna Mattsson; Sweden
65 kg	Irina Rîngaci; Moldova	Miwa Morikawa; Japan	Forrest Molinari; United States
68 kg	Meerim Zhumanazarova; Kyrgyzstan	Rin Miyaji; Japan	Tamyra Mensah-Stock; United States
68 kg	Meerim Zhumanazarova; Kyrgyzstan	Rin Miyaji; Japan	Khanum Velieva; Russian Wrestling Federation
72 kg	Masako Furuichi; Japan	Zhamila Bakbergenova; Kazakhstan	Buse Tosun Çavuşoğlu; Turkey
72 kg	Masako Furuichi; Japan	Zhamila Bakbergenova; Kazakhstan	Anna Schell; Germany
76 kg	Adeline Gray; United States	Epp Mäe; Estonia	Samar Amer; Egypt
76 kg	Adeline Gray; United States	Epp Mäe; Estonia	Aiperi Medet Kyzy; Kyrgyzstan

== Participating nations ==
648 competitors from 66 nations participated.

- Albania (1)
- Argentina (1)
- Armenia (12)
- Australia (1)
- Austria (4)
- Azerbaijan (22)
- Bahrain (3)
- Belarus (22)
- Belgium (1)
- Brazil (6)
- Bulgaria (20)
- Canada (15)
- Chile (2)
- Colombia (2)
- Costa Rica (2)
- Croatia (4)
- Czech Republic (4)
- Denmark (3)
- Ecuador (2)
- Egypt (3)
- Estonia (7)
- Finland (5)
- France (9)
- Georgia (20)
- Germany (22)
- Great Britain (3)
- Greece (3)
- Hungary (13)
- India (30)
- Iran (20)
- Israel (3)
- Italy (6)
- Japan (30)
- Kazakhstan (27)
- Kenya (9)
- Kyrgyzstan (15)
- Latvia (3)
- Lithuania (12)
- Mexico (9)
- Moldova (15)
- Mongolia (20)
- Morocco (1)
- Nepal (2)
- Nigeria (2)
- North Macedonia (2)
- Norway (12)
- Palestine (1)
- Poland (23)
- Puerto Rico (2)
- Qatar (1)
- Romania (8)
- Russian Wrestling Federation (30)
- San Marino (1)
- Serbia (9)
- Slovakia (6)
- South Korea (27)
- Spain (2)
- Sri Lanka (5)
- Sweden (8)
- Switzerland (1)
- Tajikistan (1)
- Turkey (30)
- Ukraine (30)
- United States (30)
- Venezuela (1)
- Yemen (2)
- Under the Court of Arbitration for Sport ban, Russia may not use its name, flag, or anthem and must present themselves as "Neutral Athlete" or "Neutral Team" at any world championships until 16 December 2022. Thus, Russian wrestlers competed under a modified flag and the name "Russian Wrestling Federation" (RWF) at the 2021 World Championships.
