= Arthur Sargsyan =

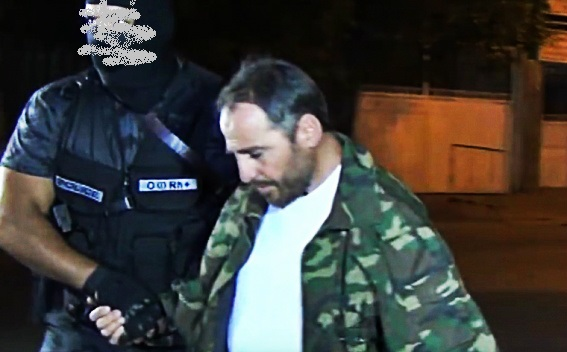
- Born: 9 August 1968; Armenian SSR, USSR
- Died: March 16, 2017 (aged 48); Yerevan
- Occupation: War veteran
- Years active: 1991-1994
- Spouse: no

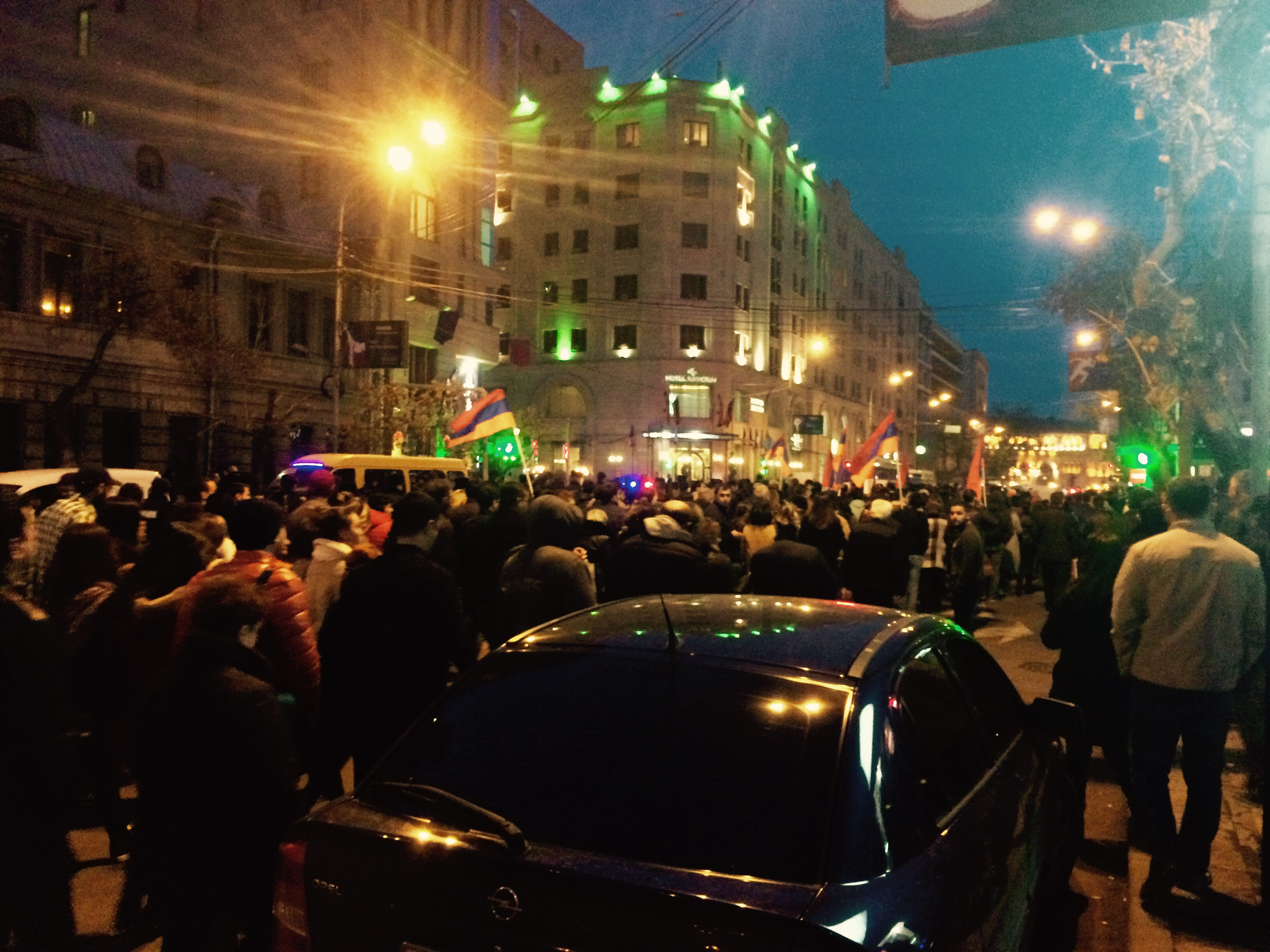
Rally in memory of Arthur Sargsyan.

Arthur Roberti Sargsyan (Armenian: Արթուր Ռոբերտի Սարգսյան), better known as the Bread Bringer was an Armenian handcraft master, First Nagorno-Karabakh War veteran. He is known in Armenia as a man who brought food to the members of Sasna Tsrer armed group during the 2016 Yerevan hostage crisis. While doing it he rushed through the line of policemen, putting his life at risk. He was arrested after the events and went on hunger strike for 25 days. After that, he died of a heart failure derived from complications during surgery on intestinal rupture while being treated at the Armenia Medical Center. Deputy director of the medical center stated that he was taken to hospital, but it was too late. He is seen by many as a symbol of resistance to the Armenian ruling regime's heavy-handed response to popular protests.

He finished the National Polytechnic University of Armenia. During the Karabakh war he also brought meals to the front line and was wounded.

Sargsyan's death escalated protests in Yerevan. Armenian ombudsman demanded maximum transparency in the criminal investigation. Supporters of Arthur Sargsyan organized marches in Yerevan. He was nominated for the annual Aurora Prize.
