= Kiryl Maskevich =

Belarusian Greco-Roman wrestler

Personal information
- Born: 6 March 1998 (age 28) Barysaw, Minsk Oblast
- Height: 180 cm (5 ft 11 in)

Sport
- Country: Belarus
- Sport: Amateur wrestling
- Weight class: 87 kg
- Event: Greco-Roman
Medal record
Men's Greco-Roman wrestling
Representing UWW
World Championships
| Bronze medal – third place | 2025 Zagreb | 97 kg |
European Championships
| Bronze medal – third place | 2025 Bratislava | 97 kg |
Grand Prix
| Silver medal – second place | 2026 Tirana | 97 kg |
Representing Individual Neutral Athletes
European Championships
| Bronze medal – third place | 2024 Bucharest | 87 kg |
Representing Belarus
World Championships
| Gold medal – first place | 2021 Oslo | 87 kg |
| Gold medal – first place | 2026 Astana | 97 kg |
European Championships
| Silver medal – second place | 2021 Warsaw | 87 kg |
Individual World Cup
| Gold medal – first place | 2020 Belgrade | 87 kg |
Dan Kolov & Nikola Petrov Tournament
| Gold medal – first place | 2022 Veliko Tarnovo | 87 kg |
World U23 Championships
| Bronze medal – third place | 2019 Budapest | 87 kg |

Kiryl Maskevich (born 6 March 1998) is a Belarusian Greco-Roman wrestler. He is a silver medalist at both the World Wrestling Championships and the European Wrestling Championships. He also represented Belarus at the 2020 Summer Olympics held in Tokyo, Japan in the men's 87 kg event.

== Career ==
Maskevich won one of the bronze medals in the 87 kg event at the 2019 World U23 Wrestling Championship in Budapest, Hungary. In 2020, he was eliminated in his first match in the 87 kg event at the European Wrestling Championships held in Rome, Italy. In that same year, he won the gold medal in the 87 kg event at the 2020 Individual Wrestling World Cup held in Belgrade, Serbia.

In 2021, Maskevich won the silver medal in the 87 kg event at the European Wrestling Championships held in Warsaw, Poland. In 2022, he won the gold medal in the 87 kg event at the Dan Kolov & Nikola Petrov Tournament held in Veliko Tarnovo, Bulgaria.

He won one of the bronze medals in the 87 kg event at the 2024 European Wrestling Championships held in Bucharest, Romania. He competed at the 2024 European Wrestling Olympic Qualification Tournament in Baku, Azerbaijan hoping to qualify for the 2024 Summer Olympics in Paris, France.

== Achievements ==
| Year | Tournament | Venue | Result | Event |
|---|---|---|---|---|
| 2021 | European Championships | Warsaw, Poland | 2nd | Greco-Roman 87 kg |
| 2021 | World Championships | Oslo, Norway | 1st | Greco-Roman 87 kg |
| 2024 | European Championships | Bucharest, Romania | 3rd | Greco-Roman 87 kg |
| 2025 | European Championships | Bratislava, Slovakia | 3rd | Greco-Roman 97 kg |
