= Artur Sargsian =

Russian Greco-Roman wrestler

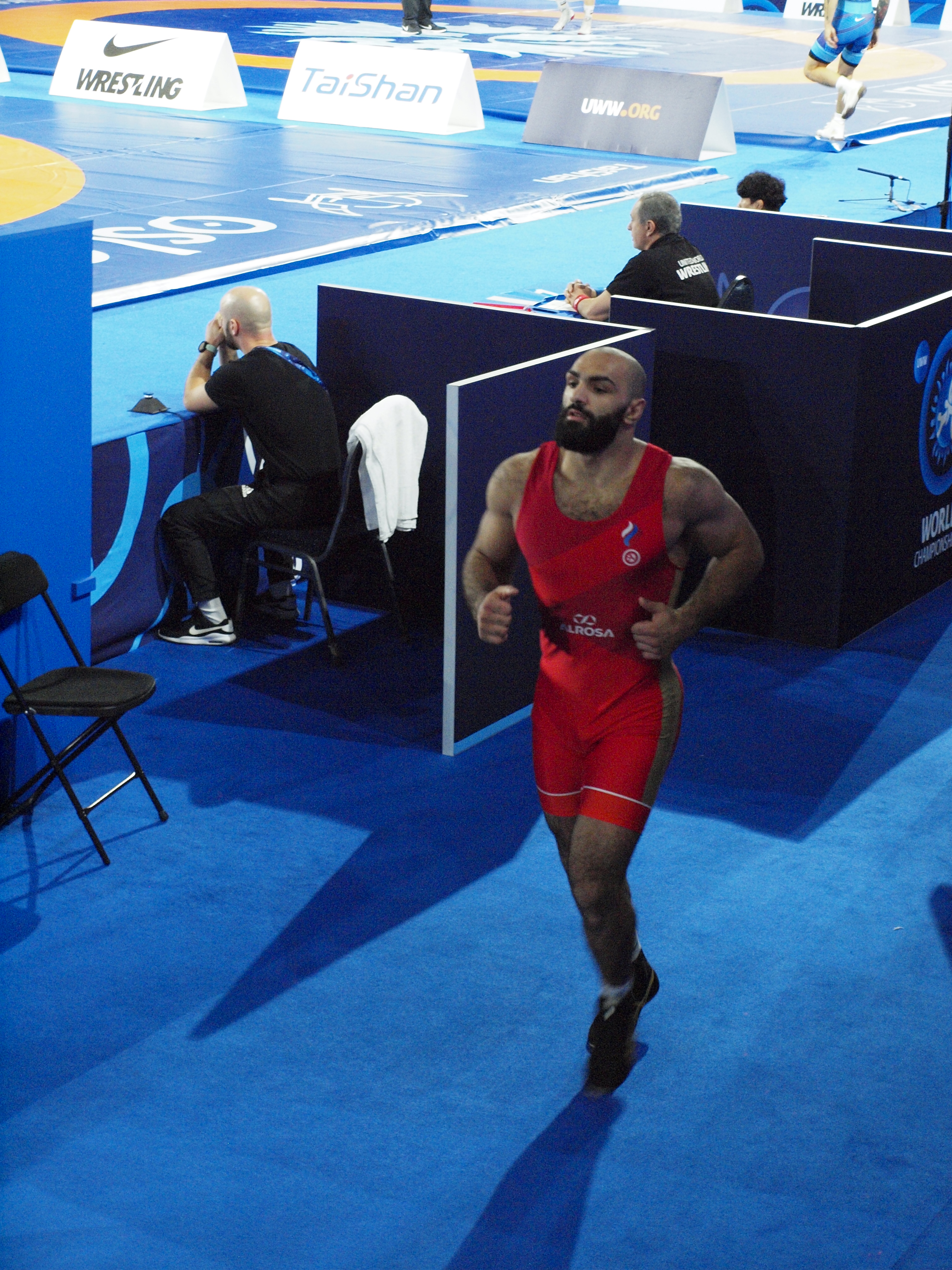
- Artur Sargsian at the 2021 World Wrestling Championships in Oslo, Norway

Personal information
- Born: March 13, 1998 (age 28) Kimry, Tver Oblast, Russia

Sport
- Country: Russia
- Sport: Amateur wrestling
- Event: Greco-Roman
Medal record
Men's Greco-Roman wrestling
Representing Individual Neutral Athletes
World Championships
Silver medal – second place	2025 Zagreb	97 kg
Vehbi Emre & Hamit Kaplan Tournament
Bronze medal – third place	2024 Antalya	97 kg
Grand Prix
Gold medal – first place	2025 Zagreb	97 kg
Representing Russian Wrestling Federation
World Championships
Bronze medal – third place	2021 Oslo	97 kg
Representing Russia
World Championships
Silver medal – second place	2026 Astana	97 kg
World U23 Championships
Gold medal – first place	2021 Belgrade	97 kg
European U23 Championships
Gold medal – first place	2021 Skopje	97 kg

Artur Sargsian is a Russian Greco-Roman wrestler of Armenian descent. He won one of the bronze medals in the 97 kg event at the 2021 World Wrestling Championships held in Oslo, Norway. In his bronze medal match he defeated Nikoloz Kakhelashvili of Italy.

== Career ==
At the 2021 U23 World Wrestling Championships held in Belgrade, Serbia, he won the gold medal in the 97 kg event. In 2024, at the World Olympic Qualification Tournament held in Istanbul, Turkey, he earned a quota place for the Individual Neutral Athletes for the 2024 Summer Olympics held in Paris, France.
