= Murad Ahmadiyev =

Azerbaijani Greco-Roman wrestler (born 2001)

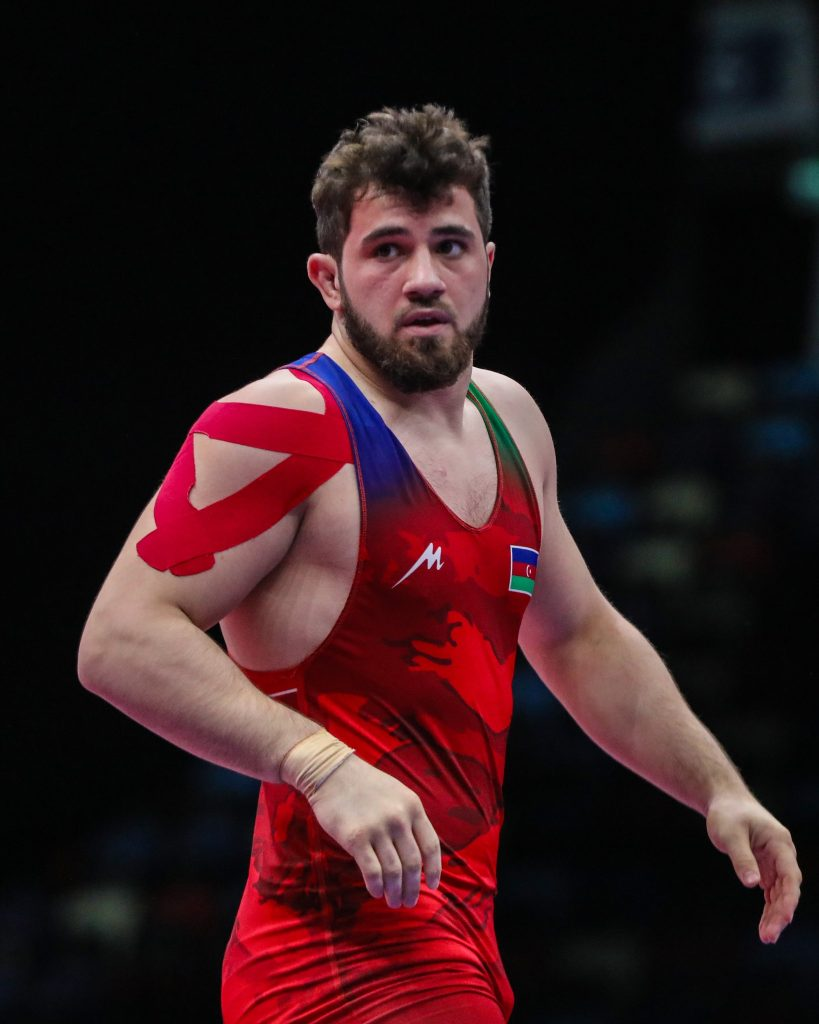
- Ahmadiyev at the 2024 European Wrestling Olympic Qualification Tournament in Baku

Personal information
- Nationality: Azerbaijan
- Born: 6 September 2001 (age 24) Balakan District, Azerbaijan
- Height: 185 cm (6 ft 1 in)

Sport
- Sport: Amateur wrestling
- Weight class: 97 kg
- Event: Greco-Roman wrestling
- Coached by: Elvin Mursaliyev
Medal record
Men's Greco-Roman wrestling
Representing Azerbaijan
World Championships
Bronze medal – third place	2025 Zagreb	97 kg
World Military Championships
Gold medal – first place	2023 Baku	97 kg
Islamic Solidarity Games
Silver medal – second place	2025 Riyadh	97 kg
CIS Games
Silver medal – second place	2023 Minsk	97 kg
European U23 Championships
Gold medal – first place	2023 Bucharest	97 kg
Bronze medal – third place	2024 Baku	97 kg

Murad Ahmadiyev (Azerbaijani: Murad Əhmədiyev; born 6 September 2001) is an Azerbaijani Greco-Roman wrestler who competes in the 97 kg division. He is a member of the Azerbaijani national team. Ahmadiyev won a bronze medal at the 2025 World Wrestling Championships.

== Career ==
Ahmadiyev was born in Balakan District on 6 September 2001. He began wrestling at the local Balakan wrestling school and later joined the national team.

In December 2022, he placed second at the Azerbaijani national freestyle championships in the 92 kg category.

At the 2023 European U23 Wrestling Championships in Bucharest, Ahmadiyev claimed gold in the 97 kg event, defeating Hungary's Alex Szőke in the final.

Later in 2023, he competed at the 2023 U23 World Wrestling Championships in Tirana, Albania, where he placed fifth. The same year, he also won the 2023 Azerbaijan Wrestling Championships in the 97 kg Greco-Roman category.

In 2024, Ahmadiyev earned bronze at the 2024 European U23 Wrestling Championships in Baku. He also participated in the 2024 European Wrestling Championships and both the European and World Olympic qualification tournaments, but did not secure a quota place for the Paris 2024 Olympic Games.

In April 2025, Ahmadiyev wrestled at the 2025 European Wrestling Championships in Bratislava, but was eliminated in the round of 16. In September, he claimed a bronze medal at the 2025 World Wrestling Championships in Zagreb in the 97 kg category.

As of April 1, 2026, with a score of 320 points, holds sixth place in the ranking of Azerbaijani athletes according to the Ministry of Youth and Sports.
