= Alex Szőke =

Hungarian Greco-Roman wrestler

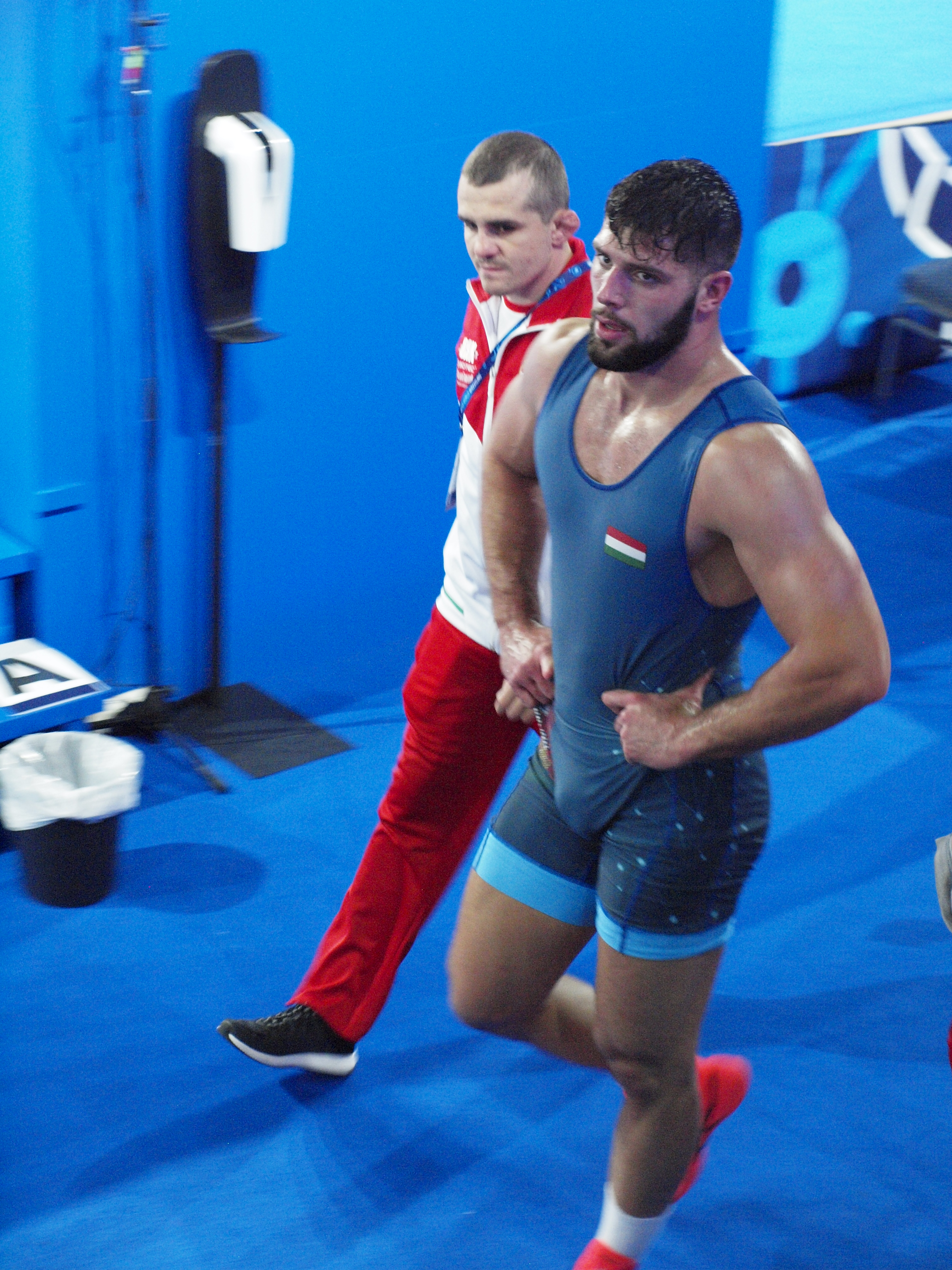
- Szőke at the 2021 World Wrestling Championships in Oslo, Norway

Personal information
- Full name: Alex Gergő Szőke
- Born: 3 March 2000 (age 26) Budapest, Hungary

Sport
- Country: Hungary
- Sport: Amateur wrestling
- Weight class: 97 kg
- Event: Greco-Roman
Medal record
Men's Greco-Roman wrestling
Representing Hungary
World Championships
Silver medal – second place	2021 Oslo	97 kg
Individual World Cup
Silver medal – second place	2020 Belgrade	97 kg
European Championships
Bronze medal – third place	2025 Bratislava	97 kg
World U23 Championships
Gold medal – first place	2022 Pontevedra	97 kg

Alex Gergő Szőke (born 3 March 2000) is a Hungarian Greco-Roman wrestler. He won the silver medal in the 97 kg event at the 2021 World Wrestling Championships held in Oslo, Norway. He also represented Hungary at the 2020 Summer Olympics in Tokyo, Japan.

== Career ==
In February 2020, Szőke competed in the 97 kg event at the European Wrestling Championships in Rome, Italy. In December 2020, he won the silver medal in the 97 kg event at the Individual Wrestling World Cup held in Belgrade, Serbia.

In March 2021, Szőke competed at the European Qualification Tournament in Budapest, Hungary hoping to qualify for the 2020 Summer Olympics in Tokyo, Japan. He did not qualify at this tournament but, in May 2021, he was able to qualify for the Olympics at the World Olympic Qualification Tournament held in Sofia, Bulgaria. At the Olympics, Szőke lost his bronze medal match against Tadeusz Michalik of Poland in the men's 97 kg event.

In 2022, Szőke won one of the bronze medals in his event at the Matteo Pellicone Ranking Series held in Rome, Italy. He competed in the 97 kg event at the 2022 World Wrestling Championships held in Belgrade, Serbia.

Szőke competed at the 2024 European Wrestling Olympic Qualification Tournament in Baku, Azerbaijan hoping to qualify for the 2024 Summer Olympics in Paris, France. He was eliminated in his first match and he did not qualify for the Olympics. Szőke also competed at the 2024 World Wrestling Olympic Qualification Tournament held in Istanbul, Turkey without qualifying for the Olympics.

== Achievements ==
Year	Tournament	Location	Result	Event
2021	World Championships	Oslo, Norway	2nd	Greco-Roman 97 kg
2025	European Championships	Bratislava, Slovakia	3rd	Greco-Roman 97 kg
