= 2026 European Wrestling Championships – Men's freestyle 57 kg =

Wrestling competition

Men's freestyle 57 kg at the 2026 European Wrestling Championships
- Venue: Tirana Olympic Park
- Location: Tirana, Albania
- Dates: 24-25 April
- Competitors: 13

Medalists
gold medal	Islam Bazarganov	Azerbaijan
silver medal	Musa Mekhtikhanov
bronze medal	Manvel Khndzrtsyan	Armenia
bronze medal	Aryan Tsiutryn

The men's freestyle 57 kg is a competition featured at the 2026 European Wrestling Championships, and was held in Tirana, Albania on April 24 and 25.

== Results ==
Legend

- F — Won by fall

=== Main bracket ===
Round of 16
Roman Hutsuliak (UKR)	0
Azamat Tuskaev (SRB)	11
Ivaylo Tisov (BUL)	0
Răzvan Kovacs (ROU)	6^{F}
Manvel Khndzrtsyan (ARM)	12
Horst Lehr (GER)	6
Ion Bulgaru (MDA)	WO
Endrio Avdyli (ALB)
Aryan Tsiutryn (UWW)	10
Yusuf Demir (TUR)	0

Quarterfinals
Musa Mekhtikhanov (UWW)	5
Azamat Tuskaev (SRB)	0
Răzvan Kovacs (ROU)	1
Manvel Khndzrtsyan (ARM)	12
Robert Dingashvili (GEO)	11
Ion Bulgaru (MDA)	1
Aryan Tsiutryn (UWW)	4
Islam Bazarganov (AZE)	9

Semifinals
Musa Mekhtikhanov (UWW)	5
Manvel Khndzrtsyan (ARM)	0
Robert Dingashvili (GEO)	1
Islam Bazarganov (AZE)	11

Final
Musa Mekhtikhanov (UWW)	6
Islam Bazarganov (AZE)	8

=== Repechage ===
Bronze medal matches
Azamat Tuskaev (SRB)	6
Manvel Khndzrtsyan (ARM)	18
Aryan Tsiutryn (UWW)	8
Robert Dingashvili (GEO)	3

== Final standing ==
Rank	Athlete
1st place, gold medalist(s)	Islam Bazarganov (AZE)
2nd place, silver medalist(s)	Musa Mekhtikhanov (UWW)
3rd place, bronze medalist(s)	Manvel Khndzrtsyan (ARM)
3rd place, bronze medalist(s)	Aryan Tsiutryn (UWW)
5	Azamat Tuskaev (SRB)
5	Robert Dingashvili (GEO)
7	Răzvan Kovacs (ROU)
8	Ion Bulgaru (MDA)
9	Horst Lehr (GER)
10	Endrio Avdyli (ALB)
11	Ivaylo Tisov (BUL)
12	Yusuf Demir (TUR)
13	Roman Hutsuliak (UKR)
