= 2025 European Wrestling Championships – Men's freestyle 57 kg =

Wrestling competition

Men's freestyle 57 kg at the 2025 European Wrestling Championships
- Venue: X-Bionic Sphere
- Location: Bratislava, Slovakia
- Dates: 6-8 April
- Competitors: 13

Medalists
gold medal	Nachyn Mongush
silver medal	Azamat Tuskaev	Serbia
bronze medal	Aryan Tsiutryn
bronze medal	Islam Bazarganov	Azerbaijan

The men's freestyle 57 kg is a competition featured at the 2025 European Wrestling Championships, and was held in Bratislava, Slovakia on April 7 and 8.

== Results ==
Legend

- F — Won by fall

=== Main bracket ===
Round of 16
Kamil Kerymov (UKR)	0
Aryan Tsiutryn (UWW)	11
Azamat Tuskaev (SRB)	4
Niklas Stechele (GER)	0
Rocco Terranova (ITA)	1
Roberti Dingashvili (GEO)	11
Nachyn Mongush (UWW)	11
Ivaylo Tisov (BUL)	0
Muhammet Karavuş (TUR)	10
Răzvan Kovacs (ROU)	0

Quarterfinals
Thomas Epp (SUI)	0
Aryan Tsiutryn (UWW)	10
Azamat Tuskaev (SRB)	13
Roberti Dingashvili (GEO)	5
Manvel Khndzrtsyan (ARM)	1
Nachyn Mongush (UWW)	4
Muhammet Karavuş (TUR)	1
Islam Bazarganov (AZE)	8

Semifinals
Aryan Tsiutryn (UWW)	1
Azamat Tuskaev (SRB)	3
Nachyn Mongush (UWW)	5
Islam Bazarganov (AZE)	0

Final
Azamat Tuskaev (SRB)	4
Nachyn Mongush (UWW)	7

=== Repechage ===
Repechage round 1
Niklas Stechele (GER)	9
Roberti Dingashvili (GEO)	5
Ivaylo Tisov (BUL)	15^{F}
Manvel Khndzrtsyan (ARM)	12

Bronze medal match
Niklas Stechele (GER)	1
Aryan Tsiutryn (UWW)	4
Ivaylo Tisov (BUL)	2
Islam Bazarganov (AZE)	12

== Final standing ==
Rank	Athlete
1st place, gold medalist(s)	Nachyn Mongush (UWW)
2nd place, silver medalist(s)	Azamat Tuskaev (SRB)
3rd place, bronze medalist(s)	Aryan Tsiutryn (UWW)
3rd place, bronze medalist(s)	Islam Bazarganov (AZE)
5	Niklas Stechele (GER)
5	Ivaylo Tisov (BUL)
7	Roberti Dingashvili (GEO)
8	Muhammet Karavuş (TUR)
9	Manvel Khndzrtsyan (ARM)
10	Rocco Terranova (ITA)
11	Thomas Epp (SUI)
12	Răzvan Kovacs (ROU)
13	Kamil Kerymov (UKR)
