= 2024 Grand Prix Zagreb Open =

Wrestling event in Croatia

- Host city: Zagreb, Croatia
- Dates: 10–14 January 2024
- Stadium: Dom Sportova

Champions
- Freestyle: United States
- Greco-Roman: Azerbaijan
- Women: Ukraine

The 2024 Grand Prix Zagreb Open also known as 1st Ranking Series was a wrestling event held in Zagreb, Croatia between 10 and 14 January 2024. It was held as the first of the ranking series of United World Wrestling in 2024. With an aim to reward wrestlers participating in Ranking Series tournaments, the United World Wrestling will award prize money to the medal winners in all weight classes with a total prize money of 390,000 Swiss Francs. The gold medal winners at the four Ranking Series tournaments in 2024 will receive 1500 Swiss Francs with the silver medallists getting 750 Swiss Francs. The two bronze medallists will receive 500 Swiss Francs each.

== Ranking Series ==
Ranking Series Calendar 2024:

- 1st Ranking Series: 10–14 January, Croatia, Zagreb ⇒ 2024 Grand Prix Zagreb Open
- 2nd Ranking Series: 6–9 June, Hungary, Budapest ⇒ 2024 Polyák Imre & Varga János Memorial Tournament

== Competition schedule ==
All times are (UTC+2)

Date	Time	Event
10 January	10.00-14.30	Qualification rounds & repechage FS 57-61-65-70-74-86 kg
10 January	18.00-20.30	Final matches and awarding ceremony: FS 57-61-65-70-74-86 kg
11 January	10.00-14.30	Qualification rounds & repechage FS 79-92-97-125 kg & WW 50–55 kg
11 January	18.00-20.30	Final matches and awarding ceremony: Finals FS 79-92-97-125 kg & WW 50–55 kg
12 January	10.00-14.30	Qualification rounds & repechage WW 59-62-65-68 kg & GR 77–87 kg
12 January	18.00-20.30	Final matches and awarding ceremony: Finals WW 59-62-65-68 kg & GR 77–87 kg
13 January	10.00-14.30	Qualification rounds & repechage WW 53-57-72-76 kg & GR 63–67 kg
13 January	18.00-20.30	Final matches and awarding ceremony: Finals WW 53-57-72-76 kg & GR 63–67 kg
14 January	10.00-14.30	Qualification rounds & repechage GR 55-60-72-82-97-130 kg
14 January	18.00-20.30	Final matches and awarding ceremony: Finals GR 55-60-72-82-97-130 kg

== Medal table ==
* Host nation (Croatia)

Rank	Nation	Gold	Silver	Bronze	Total
1	Iran	4	4	2	10
2	Ukraine	4	1	2	7
3	China	3	5	2	10
–	Individual Neutral Athletes	3	1	7	11
4	United States	2	4	7	13
5	Georgia	2	2	3	7
6	Azerbaijan	2	0	5	7
7	Kyrgyzstan	2	0	0	2
8	Hungary	1	3	2	6
9	Turkey	1	2	4	7
10	Bulgaria	1	0	2	3
11	Japan	1	0	1	2
11	Mongolia	1	0	1	2
13	Armenia	1	0	0	1
13	Canada	1	0	0	1
13	United World Wrestling	1	0	0	1
16	Moldova	0	2	2	4
17	Serbia	0	1	2	3
17	Sweden	0	1	2	3
19	Poland	0	1	1	2
20	Finland	0	1	0	1
20	France	0	1	0	1
20	Kazakhstan	0	1	0	1
23	Germany	0	0	3	3
24	Croatia*	0	0	1	1
24	Italy	0	0	1	1
24	Lithuania	0	0	1	1
Totals (26 entries)		30	30	51	111

== Team ranking ==
Rank	Men's freestyle		Men's Greco-Roman		Women's freestyle	
Rank	Team	Points	Team	Points	Team	Points
1	United States	159	Azerbaijan	95	Ukraine	125
2	Iran	115	Hungary	90	China	115
3	Georgia	110	Turkey	81	United States	65
4	Azerbaijan	54	Sweden	50	Kyrgyzstan	50
5	Bulgaria	50	Iran	49	Moldova	50
6	Turkey	39	Georgia	45	Hungary	50
7	United World Wrestling	37	Ukraine	45	Canada	45
8	Ukraine	37	Germany	43	Turkey	45
9	China	35	Serbia	40	Poland	45
10	Hungary	33	France	34	Japan	35

== Medal overview ==
=== Men's freestyle ===
Event	Gold	Silver	Bronze
57 kg	Aman Sehrawat; India	Zou Wanhao; China	Georgi Vangelov; Bulgaria
57 kg	Aman Sehrawat; India	Zou Wanhao; China	Muhammet Karavuş; Turkey
61 kg	Erdenebatyn Bekhbayar; Mongolia	Andrii Dzhelep; Ukraine	Nuraddin Novruzov; Azerbaijan
61 kg	Erdenebatyn Bekhbayar; Mongolia	Andrii Dzhelep; Ukraine	Aliabbas Rzazade; Azerbaijan
65 kg	Vazgen Tevanyan; Armenia	Rahman Amouzad; Iran	Abbas Ebrahimzadeh; Iran
65 kg	Vazgen Tevanyan; Armenia	Rahman Amouzad; Iran	Joseph McKenna; United States
70 kg	Akaki Kemertelidze; Georgia	Giorgi Elbakidze; Georgia	Doug Zapf; United States
74 kg	Jason Nolf; United States	Hossein Abouzari; Iran	Dzhabrail Gadzhiev; Azerbaijan
74 kg	Jason Nolf; United States	Hossein Abouzari; Iran	Murad Kuramagomedov; Hungary
79 kg	Mohammad Nokhodi; Iran	Avtandil Kentchadze; Georgia	Evan Wick; United States
86 kg	Magomed Ramazanov; Bulgaria	Azamat Dauletbekov; Kazakhstan	Evsem Shvelidze; Georgia
86 kg	Magomed Ramazanov; Bulgaria	Azamat Dauletbekov; Kazakhstan	Chance Marsteller; United States
92 kg	Nate Jackson; United States	Andro Margishvili; Georgia	Miriani Maisuradze; Georgia
97 kg	Amir Ali Azarpira; Iran	Kyle Snyder; United States	Kamran Ghasempour; Iran
97 kg	Amir Ali Azarpira; Iran	Kyle Snyder; United States	Isaac Trumble; United States
125 kg	Amir Hossein Zare; Iran	Amir Reza Masoumi; Iran	Deng Zhiwei; China
125 kg	Amir Hossein Zare; Iran	Amir Reza Masoumi; Iran	Mason Parris; United States

=== Men's Greco-Roman ===
Event	Gold	Silver	Bronze
55 kg	Adem Uzun; Turkey	Maksim Stupakevich; Individual Neutral Athletes	None awarded as there were only 2 competitors.
60 kg	Sadyk Lalaev; Individual Neutral Athletes	Victor Ciobanu; Moldova	Anvar Allakhiarov; Individual Neutral Athletes
60 kg	Sadyk Lalaev; Individual Neutral Athletes	Victor Ciobanu; Moldova	Edmond Nazaryan; Bulgaria
63 kg	Leri Abuladze; Georgia	Alexander Bica; Sweden	Georgii Tibilov; Serbia
63 kg	Leri Abuladze; Georgia	Alexander Bica; Sweden	Jacopo Sandron; Italy
67 kg	Parviz Nasibov; Ukraine	Gagik Snjoyan; France	Aslan Visaitov; Individual Neutral Athletes
67 kg	Parviz Nasibov; Ukraine	Gagik Snjoyan; France	Hasrat Jafarov; Azerbaijan
72 kg	Ulvu Ganizade; Azerbaijan	Levente Lévai; Hungary	Dominik Etlinger; Croatia
72 kg	Ulvu Ganizade; Azerbaijan	Levente Lévai; Hungary	Muhammed Ali Göçmen; Turkey
77 kg	Sanan Suleymanov; Azerbaijan	Zoltán Lévai; Hungary	Yunus Emre Başar; Turkey
77 kg	Sanan Suleymanov; Azerbaijan	Zoltán Lévai; Hungary	Nao Kusaka; Japan
82 kg	Erik Szilvássy; Hungary	Alperen Berber; Turkey	Deni Nakaev; Germany
82 kg	Erik Szilvássy; Hungary	Alperen Berber; Turkey	Lukas Ahlgren; Sweden
87 kg	Milad Alirzaev; Individual Neutral Athletes	Alireza Mohmadi; Iran	Aleksandr Komarov; Serbia
87 kg	Milad Alirzaev; Individual Neutral Athletes	Alireza Mohmadi; Iran	Alan Ostaev; Individual Neutral Athletes
97 kg	Abubakar Khaslakhanau; Individual Neutral Athletes	Arvi Savolainen; Finland	Aleksandar Stjepanetic; Sweden
97 kg	Abubakar Khaslakhanau; Individual Neutral Athletes	Arvi Savolainen; Finland	Pavel Hlinchuk; Individual Neutral Athletes
130 kg	Fardin Hedayati; Iran	Meng Lingzhe; China	Dáriusz Vitek; Hungary
130 kg	Fardin Hedayati; Iran	Meng Lingzhe; China	Mantas Knystautas; Lithuania

=== Women's freestyle ===
Event	Gold	Silver	Bronze
50 kg	Yui Susaki; Japan	Feng Ziqi; China	Nadezhda Sokolova; Individual Neutral Athletes
50 kg	Yui Susaki; Japan	Feng Ziqi; China	Dolgorjavyn Otgonjargal; Mongolia
53 kg	Pang Qianyu; China	Stalvira Orshush; Hungary	Jowita Wrzesień; Poland
53 kg	Pang Qianyu; China	Stalvira Orshush; Hungary	Annika Wendle; Germany
55 kg	Samantha Stewart; Canada	Roksana Zasina; Poland	Mariana Drăguțan; Moldova
55 kg	Samantha Stewart; Canada	Roksana Zasina; Poland	Mariia Vinnyk; Ukraine
57 kg	Hong Kexin; China	Zhang Qi; China	Feng Yongxin; China
57 kg	Hong Kexin; China	Zhang Qi; China	Anastasia Nichita; Moldova
59 kg	Alina Filipovych; Ukraine	Mariana Cherdivara; Moldova	Alyona Kolesnik; Azerbaijan
62 kg	Aisuluu Tynybekova; Kyrgyzstan	Kayla Miracle; United States	Alina Kasabieva; Individual Neutral Athletes
62 kg	Aisuluu Tynybekova; Kyrgyzstan	Kayla Miracle; United States	Veranika Ivanova; Individual Neutral Athletes
65 kg	Alla Belinska; Ukraine	Kadriye Aksoy; Turkey	Anne Nürnberger; Germany
68 kg	Zhou Feng; China	Forrest Molinari; United States	Buse Tosun Çavuşoğlu; Turkey
68 kg	Zhou Feng; China	Forrest Molinari; United States	Tetiana Rizhko; Ukraine
72 kg	Iryna Zablotska; Ukraine	Fanni Nađ; Serbia	None awarded as there were only 2 competitors.
76 kg	Aiperi Medet Kyzy; Kyrgyzstan	Wang Juan; China	Kennedy Blades; United States
76 kg	Aiperi Medet Kyzy; Kyrgyzstan	Wang Juan; China	Adeline Gray; United States

== Participating nations ==
543 wrestlers from 48 countries:

1. Algeria (1)
2. Argentina (1)
3. Armenia (1)
4. Azerbaijan (25)
5. Brazil (6)
6. Bulgaria (18)
7. Canada (10)
8. Chile (4)
9. China (37)
10. Croatia (15) (Host)
11. Cuba (3)
12. Czech Republic (4)
13. Ecuador (3)
14. Egypt (10)
15. Finland (5)
16. France (24)
17. Guinea-Bissau (1)
18. Georgia (28)
19. Germany (21)
20. Greece (1)
21. Honduras (1)
22. Hungary (34)
23. Iran (15)
24. Israel (5)
25. Italy (5)
26. Japan (3)
27. Kazakhstan (4)
28. Kyrgyzstan (3)
29. Saudi Arabia (9)
30. Latvia (1)
31. Lithuania (9)
32. Moldova (5)
33. Mexico (1)
34. Mongolia (3)
35. Nigeria (2)
36. Netherlands (2)
37. Norway (7)
38. Poland (17)
39. Puerto Rico (5)
40. Romania (9)
41. Serbia (10)
42. Sri Lanka (1)
43. Switzerland (11)
44. Sweden (9)
45. Turkey (21)
46. Ukraine (35)
47. United States (44)
48. Venezuela (14)
49. Individual Neutral Athletes (27)
50. United World Wrestling (13)

== Results ==
Legend

- C — Won by 3 cautions given to the opponent
- F — Won by fall
- R — Retired
- WO — Won by walkover

=== Men's freestyle ===
==== Men's freestyle 57 kg ====
Main bracket

Round of 16
Darian Cruz (PUR)	2
Zou Wanhao (CHN)	2
Horst Lehr (GER)	3
Diamantino Iuna Fafé (GBS)	1
Luka Gvinjilia (GEO)	5
Brandon Courtney (USA)	2
Li Weiyu (CHN)	1
Islam Bazarganov (AZE)	6
Roberti Dingashvili (GEO)	7
Darthe Capellan (CAN)	2
Muhammet Karavuş (TUR)	4
Aman Sehrawat (UWW)	15
Ahmet Duman (TUR)	2
Zane Richards (USA)	5

Quarterfinals
Georgi Vangelov (BUL)	0
Zou Wanhao (CHN)	3
Horst Lehr (GER)	9
Luka Gvinjilia (GEO)	7
Islam Bazarganov (AZE)	4
Roberti Dingashvili (GEO)	5
Aman Sehrawat (UWW)	11
Zane Richards (USA)	0

Semifinals
Zou Wanhao (CHN)	4
Horst Lehr (GER)	3
Roberti Dingashvili (GEO)	0
Aman Sehrawat (UWW)	11

Final
Zou Wanhao (CHN)	0
Aman Sehrawat (UWW)	10

Repechage round
Darian Cruz (PUR)	2
Georgi Vangelov (BUL)	4
Muhammet Karavuş (TUR)	17
Zane Richards (USA)	8

Bronze medal match
Georgi Vangelov (BUL)	3
Horst Lehr (GER)	1
Muhammet Karavuş (TUR)	14^{F}
Roberti Dingashvili (GEO)	5

==== Men's freestyle 61 kg ====
Main bracket

Quarterfinals		Semifinals		Final
Nuraddin Novruzov (AZE)	10
Giorgi Goniashvili (GEO)	6	Nuraddin Novruzov (AZE)	8
Andrii Dzhelep (UKR)	8	Andrii Dzhelep (UKR)	10
Daniel Popov (ISR)	2			Andrii Dzhelep (UKR)	2
Aliabbas Rzazade (AZE)	5			Erdenebatyn Bekhbayar (MGL)	9
Michael McGee (USA)	4	Aliabbas Rzazade (AZE)	0
Joey Silva (PUR)	4	Erdenebatyn Bekhbayar (MGL)	5^{F}
Erdenebatyn Bekhbayar (MGL)	11

Bronze medals
Daniel Popov (ISR)	3
Nuraddin Novruzov (AZE)	7
Joey Silva (PUR)	2
Aliabbas Rzazade (AZE)	4

==== Men's freestyle 65 kg ====
Final

Final
Rahman Amouzad (IRI)
Vazgen Tevanyan (ARM)	WO

Top half

Qualification
Rahman Amouzad (IRI)	12^{C}
Abdullah Toprak (TUR)	4
Abbas Ebrahimzadeh (IRI)	10
Goderdzi Dzebisashvili (GEO)	0
Edemi Bolkvadze (GEO)	2
Vasyl Shuptar (UKR)	1

Round of 16
Agustín Destribats (ARG)	8
Quentin Sticker (FRA)	3
Rahman Amouzad (IRI)	10
Yuan Shaohua (CHN)	0
Wei Baowen (CHN)	2
Abbas Ebrahimzadeh (IRI)	5
Edemi Bolkvadze (GEO)	3
Krzysztof Bieńkowski (POL)	5

Quarterfinals
Agustín Destribats (ARG)	0
Rahman Amouzad (IRI)	10
Abbas Ebrahimzadeh (IRI)	5
Krzysztof Bieńkowski (POL)	2

Semifinals
Rahman Amouzad (IRI)	12
Abbas Ebrahimzadeh (IRI)	4

Bottom half

Qualification
Ziraddin Bayramov (AZE)	7
Colin Realbuto (ITA)	2
Nino Leutert (SUI)	10
Nahshon Garrett (USA)	8

Round of 16
Khamzat Arsamerzouev (FRA)	1
Vazgen Tevanyan (ARM)	12
Ziraddin Bayramov (AZE)	0
Joseph McKenna (USA)	11
Josh Finesilver (ISR)	5
Nino Leutert (SUI)	4
Sebastian Rivera (PUR)	3
Mikyay Naim (BUL)	1

Quarterfinals
Vazgen Tevanyan (ARM)	5
Joseph McKenna (USA)	2
Josh Finesilver (ISR)	2
Sebastian Rivera (PUR)	7

Semifinals
Vazgen Tevanyan (ARM)	9
Sebastian Rivera (PUR)	1

Repechage round 1
Abdullah Toprak (TUR)	10
Yuan Shaohua (CHN)	0

Repechage round 2
Abdullah Toprak (TUR)	3
Agustín Destribats (ARG)	2
Khamzat Arsamerzouev (FRA)	3
Joseph McKenna (USA)	3

Bronze medals
Abdullah Toprak (TUR)	0
Abbas Ebrahimzadeh (IRI)	10
Joseph McKenna (USA)	10
Sebastian Rivera (PUR)	0

==== Men's freestyle 70 kg ====
Elimination groups

Group A

Pos	Athlete	Pld	W	L	CP	TP	GEO	SUI	BUL
1	Akaki Kemertelidze (GEO)	2	2	0	8	22	—	10–0	12–2
2	Marc Dietsche (SUI)	2	1	1	3	3	0–4 SU	—	3–3
3	Nikolay Dimitrov (BUL)	2	0	2	2	5	1–4 SU1	1–3 PO1	—

Source: UWW

Group B

Pos	Athlete	Pld	W	L	CP	TP	GEO	USA	HUN
1	Giorgi Elbakidze (GEO)	2	2	0	6	11	—	6–5	5–1
2	Doug Zapf (USA)	2	1	1	4	9	1–3 PO1	—	4–0
3	Dániel Antal (HUN)	2	0	2	1	1	1–3 PO1	0–3 PO	—

Source: UWW

Knockout round

Semifinals
Akaki Kemertelidze (GEO)	8
Doug Zapf (USA)	4
Giorgi Elbakidze (GEO)	4
Marc Dietsche (SUI)	2

Finals
Akaki Kemertelidze (GEO)	7
Giorgi Elbakidze (GEO)	4
Bronze medal match
Doug Zapf (USA)	13
Marc Dietsche (SUI)	2

==== Men's freestyle 74 kg ====
Final

Final
Hossein Abouzari (IRI)	1
Jason Nolf (USA)	10

Top half

Qualification
Quincy Monday (USA)	15
Patryk Ołenczyn (POL)	4
Krisztian Biro (ROU)	2
Dzhabrail Gadzhiev (AZE)	6
Kamil Rybicki (POL)	0
Yakup Gör (TUR)	11
Amr Reda Hussen (EGY)	4
Wurenibai Nuerlanbieke (CHN)	4
Tobias Portmann (SUI)	0
Hossein Abouzari (IRI)	11

Round of 16
Yash Tushir (UWW)	0
Quincy Monday (USA)	10
Dzhabrail Gadzhiev (AZE)	4
Yakup Gör (TUR)	3
Younes Emami (IRI)	10
Wurenibai Nuerlanbieke (CHN)	0
Hossein Abouzari (IRI)	8
Vadym Kurylenko (UKR)	0

Quarterfinals
Quincy Monday (USA)	4
Dzhabrail Gadzhiev (AZE)	5
Younes Emami (IRI)	4
Hossein Abouzari (IRI)	4

Semifinals
Dzhabrail Gadzhiev (AZE)	3
Hossein Abouzari (IRI)	10

Bottom half

Qualification
Anthony Montero (VEN)	0
Jason Nolf (USA)	11
Murad Kuramagomedov (HUN)	10
Saifedine Alekma (FRA)	0
Zelimkhan Khadjiev (FRA)	9^{F}
Ivan Stoyanov (BUL)	0
Georgios Kougioumtsidis (GRE)	9
Mitch Finesilver (ISR)	1

Round of 16
Ramazan Ramazanov (BUL)	2
Jason Nolf (USA)	12
Murad Kuramagomedov (HUN)	12
Cesar Alvan (BRA)	2
Lu Feng (CHN)	4
Zelimkhan Khadjiev (FRA)	8
Georgios Kougioumtsidis (GRE)	11
Giorgi Gogritchiani (GEO)	1

Quarterfinals
Jason Nolf (USA)	7
Murad Kuramagomedov (HUN)	0
Zelimkhan Khadjiev (FRA)	0
Georgios Kougioumtsidis (GRE)	8

Semifinals
Jason Nolf (USA)	2^{F}
Georgios Kougioumtsidis (GRE)	0

Repechage round 1
Tobias Portmann (SUI)	5
Vadym Kurylenko (UKR)	4
Anthony Montero (VEN)	3
Ramazan Ramazanov (BUL)	8

Repechage round 2
Tobias Portmann (SUI)	WO
Younes Emami (IRI)
Ramazan Ramazanov (BUL)	0
Murad Kuramagomedov (HUN)	3

Bronze medals
Tobias Portmann (SUI)	3
Dzhabrail Gadzhiev (AZE)	5
Murad Kuramagomedov (HUN)	4
Georgios Kougioumtsidis (GRE)	1

==== Men's freestyle 79 kg ====
Elimination groups

Group A

Pos	Athlete	Pld	W	L	CP	TP	GEO	USA	UKR
1	Avtandil Kentchadze (GEO)	2	2	0	8	23	—	11–0	12–2
2	Evan Wick (USA)	2	1	1	4	10	0–4 SU	—	10–0
3	Denys Pavlov (UKR)	2	0	2	1	2	1–4 SU1	0–4 SU	—

Source: UWW

Group B

Pos	Athlete	Pld	W	L	CP	TP	IRI	IRI	USA
1	Mohammad Nokhodi (IRI)	2	2	0	6	11	—	4–1	7–3
2	Abdollah Sheikhazami (IRI)	2	1	1	4	10	1–3 PO1	—	9–6
3	Joey Lavallee (USA)	2	0	2	2	9	1–3 PO1	1–3 PO1	—

Source: UWW

Knockout round

Semifinals
Avtandil Kentchadze (GEO)	12
Abdollah Sheikhazami (IRI)	2
Mohammad Nokhodi (IRI)	6
Evan Wick (USA)	6

Finals
Avtandil Kentchadze (GEO)	0
Mohammad Nokhodi (IRI)	6
Bronze medal match
Abdollah Sheikhazami (IRI)	4
Evan Wick (USA)	15^{F}

==== Men's freestyle 86 kg ====
Final

Final
Azamat Dauletbekov (KAZ)	5
Magomed Ramazanov (BUL)	8

Top half

Qualification
Mukhammed Aliiev (UKR)	4
Evsem Shvelidze (GEO)	11
Azamat Dauletbekov (KAZ)	6
Deepak Punia (UWW)	2
Zahid Valencia (USA)	2
Valentyn Babii (UKR)	10
Uri Kalashnikov (ISR)	4
Akhmed Aibuev (FRA)	3
Samuel Scherrer (SUI)	WO
~~Hadi Vafaeipour (IRI)~~

Round of 16
Li Peilong (CHN)	3
Evsem Shvelidze (GEO)	11
Azamat Dauletbekov (KAZ)	11
Valentyn Babii (UKR)	0
Gangsuhe (CHN)	0
Uri Kalashnikov (ISR)	11
Samuel Scherrer (SUI)	0
Matt Finesilver (ISR)	4

Quarterfinals
Evsem Shvelidze (GEO)	0
Azamat Dauletbekov (KAZ)	10
Uri Kalashnikov (ISR)	0
Matt Finesilver (ISR)	3

Semifinals
Azamat Dauletbekov (KAZ)	10
Matt Finesilver (ISR)	0

Bottom half

Qualification
Chance Marsteller (USA)	4
Pedro Ceballos (VEN)	0
Vladimeri Gamkrelidze (GEO)	6
Rakhim Magamadov (FRA)	3
Csaba Vida (HUN)	0
Arsenii Dzhioev (AZE)	10
Patrik Püspöki (HUN)	0
Osman Göçen (TUR)	5
Ethan Ramos (PUR)	1
Magomed Ramazanov (BUL)	12

Round of 16
Osman Nurmagomedov (AZE)	1
Chance Marsteller (USA)	3
Vladimeri Gamkrelidze (GEO)	9
Lin Zushen (CHN)	4
Arsenii Dzhioev (AZE)	10
Osman Göçen (TUR)	6
Magomed Ramazanov (BUL)	8
Maxwell Dean (USA)	3

Quarterfinals
Chance Marsteller (USA)	8
Vladimeri Gamkrelidze (GEO)	5
Arsenii Dzhioev (AZE)	1
Magomed Ramazanov (BUL)	5

Semifinals
Chance Marsteller (USA)	0
Magomed Ramazanov (BUL)	10

Repechage round 1
Deepak Punia (UWW)	4
Valentyn Babii (UKR)	1
Ethan Ramos (PUR)	8
Maxwell Dean (USA)	8

Repechage round 2
Deepak Punia (UWW)	3
Evsem Shvelidze (GEO)	4
Maxwell Dean (USA)	3
Arsenii Dzhioev (AZE)	8

Bronze medals
Evsem Shvelidze (GEO)	7
Matt Finesilver (ISR)	3
Arsenii Dzhioev (AZE)	0
Chance Marsteller (USA)	5

==== Men's freestyle 92 kg ====
Elimination groups

Group A

Pos	Athlete	Pld	W	L	CP	TP	USA	GEO	USA	UKR
1	Eric Schultz Jr. (USA)	3	3	0	10	31	—	7–1	12–4	12–2
2	Miriani Maisuradze (GEO)	3	2	1	10	11	1–3 PO1	—	10–0	WO
3	Taylor Lujan (USA)	3	1	2	6	4	1–3 PO1	0–4 SU	—	WO
4	Denys Sahaliuk (UKR)	3	0	3	1	2	1–4 SU1	0–5 IN	0–5 IN	—

Source: UWW

Group B

Pos	Athlete	Pld	W	L	CP	TP	USA	GEO	HUN
1	Nate Jackson (USA)	2	2	0	9	13	—	2–0 Fall	11–1
2	Andro Margishvili (GEO)	2	1	1	3	4	0–5 FA	—	4–3
3	Balázs Juhász (HUN)	2	0	2	2	4	1–4 SU1	1–3 PO1	—

Source: UWW

Knockout round

Semifinals
Eric Schultz Jr. (USA)	2
Andro Margishvili (GEO)	2
Nate Jackson (USA)	10
Miriani Maisuradze (GEO)	0

Finals
Andro Margishvili (GEO)	0
Nate Jackson (USA)	5^{F}
Bronze medal match
Eric Schultz Jr. (USA)	7
Miriani Maisuradze (GEO)	8

==== Men's freestyle 97 kg ====
Final

Final
Kyle Snyder (USA)	3
Amir Ali Azarpira (IRI)	6

Top half

Qualification
Kyle Snyder (USA)	11
Muheite Tuerxunbieke (CHN)	1

Round of 16
Cristian Sarco (VEN)	8
Mostafa El-Ders (EGY)	3
Kyle Snyder (USA)	10
Erhan Yaylacı (TUR)	0
Kamran Ghasempour (IRI)	6
Habila Awusayiman (CHN)	2
Nishan Randhawa (CAN)	4
İbrahim Çiftçi (TUR)	12

Quarterfinals
Cristian Sarco (VEN)	0
Kyle Snyder (USA)	10
Kamran Ghasempour (IRI)	6
İbrahim Çiftçi (TUR)	1

Semifinals
Kyle Snyder (USA)	4
Kamran Ghasempour (IRI)	0

Bottom half

Qualification
Vicky Hooda (UWW)	5
Zbigniew Baranowski (POL)	2
Radosław Baran (POL)	0
Amir Ali Azarpira (IRI)	5

Round of 16
Mamuka Kordzaia (GEO)	1
Adlan Viskhanov (FRA)	1
Vicky Hooda (UWW)	6
Ilia Archaia (UKR)	2
Michael Macchiavello (USA)	0
Amir Ali Azarpira (IRI)	10
Erik Thiele (GER)	4
Isaac Trumble (USA)	8

Quarterfinals
Mamuka Kordzaia (GEO)	0
Vicky Hooda (UWW)	5
Amir Ali Azarpira (IRI)	8
Isaac Trumble (USA)	7

Semifinals
Vicky Hooda (UWW)	0
Amir Ali Azarpira (IRI)	10

Repechage round 1
Muheite Tuerxunbieke (CHN)	0
Erhan Yaylacı (TUR)	11
Radosław Baran (POL)	5
Michael Macchiavello (USA)	0

Repechage round 2
Erhan Yaylacı (TUR)	12
Cristian Sarco (VEN)	2
Radosław Baran (POL)	10
Isaac Trumble (USA)	14

Bronze medals
Erhan Yaylacı (TUR)	1
Kamran Ghasempour (IRI)	3
Isaac Trumble (USA)	8
Vicky Hooda (UWW)	5

==== Men's freestyle 125 kg ====
Final

Final
Amir Hossein Zare (IRI)	5
Amir Reza Masoumi (IRI)	0

Top half

Qualification
Geno Petriashvili (GEO)	14
Dániel Ligeti (HUN)	3
Robert Baran (POL)	6
Yurii Idzinskyi (UKR)	5
Buheeerdun (CHN)	0
Deng Zhiwei (CHN)	3
Nick Gwiazdowski (USA)	10
Gennadij Cudinovic (GER)	0

Round of 16
Kamil Kościółek (POL)	2
Geno Petriashvili (GEO)	3
Robert Baran (POL)	12
Georgi Ivanov (BUL)	2
Amir Hossein Zare (IRI)	10
Deng Zhiwei (CHN)	0
Nick Gwiazdowski (USA)	4
Christian Lance (USA)	2

Quarterfinals
Geno Petriashvili (GEO)	11
Robert Baran (POL)	0
Amir Hossein Zare (IRI)	11
Nick Gwiazdowski (USA)	0

Semifinals
Geno Petriashvili (GEO)
Amir Hossein Zare (IRI)	WO

Bottom half

Qualification
Jonovan Smith (PUR)	1
Sumit Malik (UWW)	2
Vakhit Galayev (AZE)	3
Diaaeldin Kamal (EGY)	2
Solomon Manashvili (GEO)	7
José Daniel Díaz (VEN)	2
Amir Reza Masoumi (IRI)	6
Givi Matcharashvili (GEO)	2

Round of 16
Amar Dhesi (CAN)	2
Sumit Malik (UWW)	1
Vakhit Galayev (AZE)	4
Mason Parris (USA)	15
Giorgi Meshvildishvili (AZE)	7
Solomon Manashvili (GEO)	5
Amir Reza Masoumi (IRI)	3
Youssif Hemida (EGY)	0

Quarterfinals
Amar Dhesi (CAN)	0
Mason Parris (USA)	11
Giorgi Meshvildishvili (AZE)	4
Amir Reza Masoumi (IRI)	8

Semifinals
Mason Parris (USA)	6
Amir Reza Masoumi (IRI)	11

Repechage round 1
Givi Matcharashvili (GEO)	6
Youssif Hemida (EGY)	2

Repechage round 2
Deng Zhiwei (CHN)	7
Nick Gwiazdowski (USA)	4
Givi Matcharashvili (GEO)	1
Giorgi Meshvildishvili (AZE)	2

Bronze medals
Deng Zhiwei (CHN)	WO
Geno Petriashvili (GEO)
Giorgi Meshvildishvili (AZE)	2
Mason Parris (USA)	5

=== Men's Greco-Roman ===
==== Men's Greco-Roman 55 kg ====
Nordic group

Pos	Athlete	Pld	W	L	CP	TP	TUR	AIN
1	Adem Uzun (TUR)	1	1	0	4	10	—	10–2
2	Maksim Stupakevich (AIN)	1	0	1	1	2	1–4 SU1	—

Source: UWW

==== Men's Greco-Roman 60 kg ====
Final

Final
Sadyk Lalaev (AIN)	WO
Victor Ciobanu (MDA)

Top half

Qualification
Ihor Kurochkin (UKR)	9
Marat Garipov (BRA)	0
Tan Haodong (CHN)	0
Gyanender Dahiya (UWW)	2
Anvar Allakhiarov (AIN)	7
Nihat Mammadli (AZE)	5
Sadyk Lalaev (AIN)	7
Munthir Jandu (KSA)	1

Round of 16
Bohdan Hrynyshyn (UKR)	2
Ihor Kurochkin (UKR)	10
Gyanender Dahiya (UWW)	6
Raiber Rodríguez (VEN)	8
Justas Petravičius (LTU)	0
Anvar Allakhiarov (AIN)	7
Sadyk Lalaev (AIN)	5
Hleb Makaranka (AIN)	3

Quarterfinals
Ihor Kurochkin (UKR)	7
Raiber Rodríguez (VEN)	2
Anvar Allakhiarov (AIN)	1
Sadyk Lalaev (AIN)	3

Semifinals
Ihor Kurochkin (UKR)	1
Sadyk Lalaev (AIN)	10

Bottom half

Qualification
Nugzari Tsurtsumia (GEO)	3
Denis Mihai (ROU)	12
Hassan Al-Harthi (KSA)	4
Victor Ciobanu (MDA)	8
Hayden Tuma (USA)	1
Cao Liguo (CHN)	9
Amiran Shavadze (GEO)	1
Georgios Scarpello (GER)	4

Round of 16
Ildar Hafizov (USA)	8
Denis Mihai (ROU)	0
Victor Ciobanu (MDA)	9
Léo Tudezca (FRA)	0
Pridon Abuladze (GEO)	4
Cao Liguo (CHN)	2
Georgios Scarpello (GER)	0
Edmond Nazaryan (BUL)	9

Quarterfinals
Ildar Hafizov (USA)	1
Victor Ciobanu (MDA)	9^{F}
Pridon Abuladze (GEO)	0
Edmond Nazaryan (BUL)	9

Semifinals
Victor Ciobanu (MDA)	3
Edmond Nazaryan (BUL)	3

Repechage round 1
Munthir Jandu (KSA)	0
Hleb Makaranka (AIN)	8
Hassan Al-Harthi (KSA)	0
Léo Tudezca (FRA)	12

Repechage round 2
Hleb Makaranka (AIN)	5
Anvar Allakhiarov (AIN)	11
Léo Tudezca (FRA)	2
Ildar Hafizov (USA)	10

Bronze medals
Anvar Allakhiarov (AIN)	9
Ihor Kurochkin (UKR)	0
Ildar Hafizov (USA)	1
Edmond Nazaryan (BUL)	5

==== Men's Greco-Roman 63 kg ====
Main bracket

Round of 16
Răzvan Arnăut (ROU)	0
Georgii Tibilov (SRB)	9
Ivan Lizatović (CRO)	4
Aleksandrs Jurkjans (LAT)	4
Jacopo Sandron (ITA)	0
Alexander Bica (SWE)	9
Rayan Hawsawi (KSA)	0^{R}
Stefan Clément (FRA)	2

Quarterfinals
Matej Rebić (CRO)	0
Georgii Tibilov (SRB)	9
Aleksandrs Jurkjans (LAT)	0
Leri Abuladze (GEO)	9
Mehmet Çeker (TUR)	9
Alexander Bica (SWE)	11
Stefan Clément (FRA)	4
Murad Mammadov (AZE)	6

Semifinals
Georgii Tibilov (SRB)	5
Leri Abuladze (GEO)	5
Alexander Bica (SWE)	WO
Murad Mammadov (AZE)

Final
Leri Abuladze (GEO)	9
Alexander Bica (SWE)	0

Repechage round
Jacopo Sandron (ITA)	8
Mehmet Çeker (TUR)	5

Bronze medal match
Aleksandrs Jurkjans (LAT)	1
Georgii Tibilov (SRB)	9
Jacopo Sandron (ITA)	WO
Murad Mammadov (AZE)

==== Men's Greco-Roman 67 kg ====
Final

Semifinals		Final
Gagik Snjoyan (FRA)	4
Aslan Visaitov (AIN)	3	Gagik Snjoyan (FRA)	3
Parviz Nasibov (UKR)	4^{F}	Parviz Nasibov (UKR)	4
Hasrat Jafarov (AZE)	2

Top half

Section 1

Qualification
Danial Sohrabi (IRI)	8
Håvard Jørgensen (NOR)	7

Round of 32
Gagik Snjoyan (FRA)	7
Sebastian Nađ (SRB)	0
Neeraj Chhikara (UWW)	9
Néstor Almanza (CHI)	7
Danial Sohrabi (IRI)	WO
Andreas Vetsch (SUI)
Murat Fırat (TUR)	3
Kristupas Šleiva (LTU)	6

Round of 16
Gagik Snjoyan (FRA)	10
Neeraj Chhikara (UWW)	0
Danial Sohrabi (IRI)	2
Kristupas Šleiva (LTU)	7

Quarterfinals
Gagik Snjoyan (FRA)	5
Kristupas Šleiva (LTU)	1

Section 2

Qualification

Round of 32
Joni Khetsuriani (GEO)	5
Mamadassa Sylla (FRA)	3
Saud Al-Subaie (KSA)	0
Aslan Visaitov (AIN)	8
István Váncza (HUN)	3
Mihai Mihuț (ROU)	0
Mohamed Ibrahim El-Sayed (EGY)	12
Ivo Iliev (BUL)	0

Round of 16
Joni Khetsuriani (GEO)	1
Aslan Visaitov (AIN)	3
István Váncza (HUN)	1
Mohamed Ibrahim El-Sayed (EGY)	2

Quarterfinals
Aslan Visaitov (AIN)	7
Mohamed Ibrahim El-Sayed (EGY)	5

Bottom half

Section 3

Qualification
Robert Perez III (USA)	3
Li Lei (CHN)	5

Round of 32
Yanis Nifri (FRA)	15
Faisal Al-Dossary (KSA)	6
Moustafa Alameldin (EGY)	4
Morten Thoresen (NOR)	1
Li Lei (CHN)	10^{F}
Abu Muslim Amaev (BUL)	5
Parviz Nasibov (UKR)	7
Husiyuetu (CHN)	0

Round of 16
Yanis Nifri (FRA)	3
Moustafa Alameldin (EGY)	5
Li Lei (CHN)	1
Parviz Nasibov (UKR)	3

Quarterfinals
Moustafa Alameldin (EGY)	3
Parviz Nasibov (UKR)	3

Section 4

Qualification
Peyton Omania (USA)	2
Oleksii Masyk (UKR)	6

Round of 32
Walihan Sailike (CHN)	2
David Manyik (HUN)	1
Diego Chkhikvadze (GEO)	1
Oleksii Masyk (UKR)	7
Hasrat Jafarov (AZE)	3
Alejandro Sancho (USA)	1
Niklas Öhlén (SWE)	9^{F}
Maksym Liu (UKR)	4

Round of 16
Walihan Sailike (CHN)	1
Oleksii Masyk (UKR)	3
Hasrat Jafarov (AZE)	9
Niklas Öhlén (SWE)	0

Quarterfinals
Oleksii Masyk (UKR)	0
Hasrat Jafarov (AZE)	9

Repechage round 2
Sebastian Nađ (SRB)	8
Neeraj Chhikara (UWW)	0
Husiyuetu (CHN)	1
Li Lei (CHN)	3

Repechage round 3
Sebastian Nađ (SRB)	WO
Kristupas Šleiva (LTU)
Li Lei (CHN)	5
Moustafa Alameldin (EGY)	8

Bronze medals
Sebastian Nađ (SRB)	3
Aslan Visaitov (AIN)	4
Moustafa Alameldin (EGY)	1
Hasrat Jafarov (AZE)	5

==== Men's Greco-Roman 72 kg ====
Main bracket

Round of 16
Levente Lévai (HUN)	7
Calebe Ferreira (BRA)	3
Krisztofer Klányi (HUN)	9
Aliaksandr Liavonchyk (AIN)	0
Aaron Bellscheidt (GER)	2
Dominik Etlinger (CRO)	3
Muhammed Ali Göçmen (TUR)	9
Zsolt Takács (HUN)	0
Ulvu Ganizade (AZE)	8
Iulian Lungu (ROU)	0

Quarterfinals
Luka Malobabić (CRO)	0
Levente Lévai (HUN)	7^{F}
Krisztofer Klányi (HUN)	1
Dominik Etlinger (CRO)	7
Ahmed Barahmah (KSA)	0
Muhammed Ali Göçmen (TUR)	9
Ulvu Ganizade (AZE)	9
Michael Portmann (SUI)	0

Semifinals
Levente Lévai (HUN)	8
Dominik Etlinger (CRO)	0
Muhammed Ali Göçmen (TUR)	1
Ulvu Ganizade (AZE)	7

Final
Levente Lévai (HUN)	0
Ulvu Ganizade (AZE)	7

Repechage round
Calebe Ferreira (BRA)	8
Luka Malobabić (CRO)	7
Iulian Lungu (ROU)	2^{F}
Michael Portmann (SUI)	4

Bronze medal match
Calebe Ferreira (BRA)	0
Dominik Etlinger (CRO)	9
Iulian Lungu (ROU)	0
Muhammed Ali Göçmen (TUR)	9

==== Men's Greco-Roman 77 kg ====
Finals

Semifinals		Final
Yunus Emre Başar (TUR)	3
Sanan Suleymanov (AZE)	3	Sanan Suleymanov (AZE)	5
Zoltán Lévai (HUN)	3	Zoltán Lévai (HUN)	0^{R}
Burhan Akbudak (TUR)	1

Top half

Section 1

Round of 64
Antonio Kamenjašević (CRO)	11
Amir Abdi (IRI)	3
Volodymyr Yakovliev (UKR)	4
Oldřich Varga (CZE)	3
~~Sebastian Aak (NOR)~~
Yunus Emre Başar (TUR)	WO

Round of 32
Ali Arsalan (SRB)	4
Akseli Yli-Hannuksela (FIN)	1
Iuri Lomadze (GEO)	2
Antonio Kamenjašević (CRO)	3
Volodymyr Yakovliev (UKR)	0
Yunus Emre Başar (TUR)	9
Liu Rui (CHN)	4
Attila Tösmagi (HUN)	8

Round of 16
Ali Arsalan (SRB)	9
Antonio Kamenjašević (CRO)	0
Yunus Emre Başar (TUR)	5
Attila Tösmagi (HUN)	3

Quarterfinals
Ali Arsalan (SRB)	1
Yunus Emre Başar (TUR)	8

Section 2

Round of 64
Johnny Bur (FRA)	5
Michal Zelenka (CZE)	7
Joílson Júnior (BRA)	8
Per-Anders Kure (NOR)	5

Round of 32
Ahmet Yılmaz (TUR)	1
Sanan Suleymanov (AZE)	3
Aik Mnatsakanian (BUL)	3
Michal Zelenka (CZE)	1
Joílson Júnior (BRA)	0
Idris Ibaev (GER)	8
Vikas Dalal (UWW)	11^{C}
Ravaughn Perkins (USA)	4

Round of 16
Sanan Suleymanov (AZE)	2
Aik Mnatsakanian (BUL)	0
Idris Ibaev (GER)	10
Vikas Dalal (UWW)	0

Quarterfinals
Sanan Suleymanov (AZE)	9
Idris Ibaev (GER)	0

Bottom half

Section 3

Round of 64
Róbert Fritsch (HUN)	8
Albin Olofsson (SWE)	3
Nao Kusaka (JPN)	8
Stoyan Kubatov (BUL)	7
Khasay Hasanli (AZE)	3
Jonni Sarkkinen (FIN)	8

Round of 32
Yosvanys Peña (CUB)	7
Pavel Liakh (AIN)	7
Zoltán Lévai (HUN)	1
Róbert Fritsch (HUN)	1
Nao Kusaka (JPN)	11
Jonni Sarkkinen (FIN)	0
Dmytro Vasetskyi (UKR)	2
Ibrahim Ghanem (FRA)	5

Round of 16
Pavel Liakh (AIN)	0^{R}
Zoltán Lévai (HUN)	7
Nao Kusaka (JPN)	11
Ibrahim Ghanem (FRA)	0

Quarterfinals
Zoltán Lévai (HUN)	9
Nao Kusaka (JPN)	1

Section 4

Round of 64
Elmar Nuraliev (UKR)	2
Tsimur Berdyieu (AIN)	7
Riccardo Abbrescia (ITA)	3
Benji Peak (USA)	0
Ilie Cojocari (ROU)	1
Mikko Peltokangas (FIN)	3

Round of 32
Fabio Dietsche (SUI)	1
Burhan Akbudak (TUR)	6
Tsimur Berdyieu (AIN)	9
Riccardo Abbrescia (ITA)	0
Mikko Peltokangas (FIN)	8
Hassan Barnawi (KSA)	0
Aleksa Ilić (SRB)	0
Samuel Bellscheidt (GER)	11

Round of 16
Burhan Akbudak (TUR)	8
Tsimur Berdyieu (AIN)	1
Mikko Peltokangas (FIN)	5
Samuel Bellscheidt (GER)	3

Quarterfinals
Burhan Akbudak (TUR)	3^{F}
Mikko Peltokangas (FIN)	0

Repechage round 2
Ahmet Yılmaz (TUR)	7
Aik Mnatsakanian (BUL)	0
Róbert Fritsch (HUN)	WO
Pavel Liakh (AIN)

Repechage round 3
Ahmet Yılmaz (TUR)	10
Idris Ibaev (GER)	1
Róbert Fritsch (HUN)	1
Nao Kusaka (JPN)	5

Bronze medals
Ahmet Yılmaz (TUR)	1
Yunus Emre Başar (TUR)	2
Nao Kusaka (JPN)	8
Burhan Akbudak (TUR)	7

==== Men's Greco-Roman 82 kg ====
Main bracket

Round of 16
Mahmoud Fawzy (EGY)	7
Roland Schwarz (GER)	3
Vasile Cojoc (ROU)	4
Marc Weber (SUI)	0
Deni Nakaev (GER)	1
Karlo Kodrić (CRO)	1
Lukas Ahlgren (SWE)	2
Filip Šačić (CRO)	1
Timmy Sköld (SWE)	1
Erik Szilvássy (HUN)	3
Péter Dömök (HUN)	1
Tornike Dzamashvili (GEO)	4^{F}

Quarterfinals
Alperen Berber (TUR)	4
Mahmoud Fawzy (EGY)	2
Vasile Cojoc (ROU)	5
Deni Nakaev (GER)	10
Lukas Ahlgren (SWE)	1
Erik Szilvássy (HUN)	4
Tornike Dzamashvili (GEO)	9
Mahmoud Hawsawi (KSA)	0

Semifinals
Alperen Berber (TUR)	5
Deni Nakaev (GER)	1
Erik Szilvássy (HUN)	3
Tornike Dzamashvili (GEO)	0

Final
Alperen Berber (TUR)	0
Erik Szilvássy (HUN)	5

Repechage round
Timmy Sköld (SWE)	1
Lukas Ahlgren (SWE)	5

Bronze medal match
Mahmoud Fawzy (EGY)	2
Deni Nakaev (GER)}	6
Lukas Ahlgren (SWE)	6
Tornike Dzamashvili (GEO)	3

==== Men's Greco-Roman 87 kg ====
Finals

Semifinals		Final
Milad Alirzaev (AIN)	8
Daniel Grégorich (CUB)	7	Milad Alirzaev (AIN)	4
Alireza Mohmadi (IRI)	2	Alireza Mohmadi (IRI)	2
Alan Ostaev (AIN)	1

Top half

Section 1

Qualification
Martynas Nemsevičius (LTU)	0
Milad Alirzaev (AIN)	9

Round of 32
Yoan Dimitrov (BUL)	1
Kiryl Maskevich (AIN)	6^{F}
Spencer Woods (USA)	1
Aleksandr Komarov (SRB)	9
Milad Alirzaev (AIN)	5
Hannes Wagner (GER)	0
Ramon Betschart (SUI)	1
Ivan Huklek (CRO)	10

Round of 16
Kiryl Maskevich (AIN)	2
Aleksandr Komarov (SRB)	6
Milad Alirzaev (AIN)	1
Ivan Huklek (CRO)	1^{R}

Quarterfinals
Aleksandr Komarov (SRB)	5
Milad Alirzaev (AIN)	5

Section 2

Qualification

Round of 32
Tomislav Brkan (CRO)	8
Ihar Yarashevich (AIN)	11
Islam Abbasov (AZE)	2
István Takács (HUN)	3
Doğan Kaya (TUR)	4
Daniel Grégorich (CUB)	7
Alex Bjurberg Kessidis (SWE)	5
Qian Haitao (CHN)	0

Round of 16
Ihar Yarashevich (AIN)	1
István Takács (HUN)	1
Daniel Grégorich (CUB)	5
Alex Bjurberg Kessidis (SWE)	2

Quarterfinals
István Takács (HUN)	0
Daniel Grégorich (CUB)	6

Bottom half

Section 3

Qualification
José Moreno (CHI)	0
Bachir Sid Azara (ALG)	9

Round of 32
Marcel Sterkenburg (NED)
Luis Avendaño (VEN)	WO
Alireza Mohmadi (IRI)	5
Wang Chengwu (CHN)	0
Bachir Sid Azara (ALG)	3
Sunil Kumar (UWW)	1
Vjekoslav Luburić (CRO)	1
Achiko Bolkvadze (GEO)	9

Round of 16
Luis Avendaño (VEN)	2
Alireza Mohmadi (IRI)	9^{F}
Bachir Sid Azara (ALG)	5
Achiko Bolkvadze (GEO)	5

Quarterfinals
Alireza Mohmadi (IRI)	3
Achiko Bolkvadze (GEO)	3

Section 4

Qualification
Yaroslav Filchakov (UKR)	3
Nicu Ojog (ROU)	1

Round of 32
Mirco Minguzzi (ITA)	1
Mohamed Metwally (EGY)	10
Damian von Euw (SUI)	3
Yaroslav Filchakov (UKR)	3
Alan Ostaev (AIN)	9
Dávid Losonczi (HUN)	0
Exauce Mukubu (NOR)	12
Ioannis Narlidis (CAN)	4

Round of 16
Mohamed Metwally (EGY)	1
Yaroslav Filchakov (UKR)	3
Alan Ostaev (AIN)	12
Exauce Mukubu (NOR)	8

Quarterfinals
Yaroslav Filchakov (UKR)	1
Alan Ostaev (AIN)	4

Repechage round 1
Martynas Nemsevičius (LTU)	4
Hannes Wagner (GER)	6

Repechage round 2
Hannes Wagner (GER)	WO
Ivan Huklek (CRO)
Wang Chengwu (CHN)	9
Luis Avendaño (VEN)	0

Repechage round 3
Hannes Wagner (GER)	2
Aleksandr Komarov (SRB)	5
Wang Chengwu (CHN)	0
Achiko Bolkvadze (GEO)	8

Bronze medals
Aleksandr Komarov (SRB)	10
Daniel Grégorich (CUB)	0
Achiko Bolkvadze (GEO)	0
Alan Ostaev (AIN)	4^{F}

==== Men's Greco-Roman 97 kg ====
Finals

Semifinals		Final
Murad Ahmadiyev (AZE)	1
Abubakar Khaslakhanau (AIN)	4	Abubakar Khaslakhanau (AIN)	11
Alex Szőke (HUN)	0	Arvi Savolainen (FIN)	2
Arvi Savolainen (FIN)	6

Top half

Section 1

Qualification
Kristian Lukač (CRO)	0
Murad Ahmadiyev (AZE)	9

Round of 32
Vilius Laurinaitis (LTU)	9
Ibrahim Fallatah (KSA)	1
~~Filip Smetko (CRO)~~
Artur Omarov (CZE)	WO
Murad Ahmadiyev (AZE)	3
Mohamed Gabr (EGY)	1
Yevhenii Saveta (UKR)	2
Mikheil Kajaia (SRB)	7

Round of 16
Vilius Laurinaitis (LTU)	1
Artur Omarov (CZE)	1
Murad Ahmadiyev (AZE)	WO
Mikheil Kajaia (SRB)

Quarterfinals
Artur Omarov (CZE)	3
Murad Ahmadiyev (AZE)	6

Section 2

Qualification

Round of 32
Marcus Worren (NOR)	0
Nikoloz Kakhelashvili (ITA)	2
Abubakar Khaslakhanau (AIN)	13
Giorgi Katsanashvili (GEO)	5
Kevin Mejia (HON)	9
Vinko Prodanović (CRO)	3
Luillys Pérez (VEN)	2
Aleksandar Stjepanetic (SWE)	8

Round of 16
Nikoloz Kakhelashvili (ITA)	1
Abubakar Khaslakhanau (AIN)	8
Kevin Mejia (HON)
Aleksandar Stjepanetic (SWE)	WO

Quarterfinals
Abubakar Khaslakhanau (AIN)	8
Aleksandar Stjepanetic (SWE)	0

Bottom half

Section 3

Qualification

Round of 32
Narinder Cheema (UWW)	10
Mario Vuković (SRB)	2
Peter Öhler (GER)	2
Joe Rau (USA)	0
Serhii Omelin (UKR)	5
Alan Vera (USA)	5
Alex Szőke (HUN)	3
Murat Lokiayev (AZE)	1

Round of 16
Narinder Cheema (UWW)	0
Peter Öhler (GER)	9
Alan Vera (USA)	0
Alex Szőke (HUN)	8

Quarterfinals
Peter Öhler (GER)	1
Alex Szőke (HUN)	3

Section 4

Qualification

Round of 32
Mindaugas Venckaitis (LTU)	1
Arvi Savolainen (FIN)	5
Tyrone Sterkenburg (NED)	1
Anton Vieweg (GER)	3
Pavel Hlinchuk (AIN)	11
Tamás Lévai (HUN)	5
Luka Katic (SRB)	0
Beytullah Kayışdağ (TUR)	8

Round of 16
Arvi Savolainen (FIN)	5
Anton Vieweg (GER)	1
Pavel Hlinchuk (AIN)	2
Beytullah Kayışdağ (TUR)	0

Quarterfinals
Arvi Savolainen (FIN)	7
Pavel Hlinchuk (AIN)	0

Repechage round 2
Giorgi Katsanashvili (GEO)	1
Nikoloz Kakhelashvili (ITA)	3
Mindaugas Venckaitis (LTU)	3
Anton Vieweg (GER)	1

Repechage round 3
Nikoloz Kakhelashvili (ITA)	2
Aleksandar Stjepanetic (SWE)	4
Mindaugas Venckaitis (LTU)	0
Pavel Hlinchuk (AIN)	4^{F}

Bronze medals
Aleksandar Stjepanetic (SWE)	3
Murad Ahmadiyev (AZE)	2
Pavel Hlinchuk (AIN)	WO
Alex Szőke (HUN)

==== Men's Greco-Roman 130 kg ====
Final

Final
Meng Lingzhe (CHN)	1
Fardin Hedayati (IRI)	3

Top half

Qualification
Alin Alexuc-Ciurariu (ROU)	2
Delian Alishahi (SUI)	1
Beka Kandelaki (AZE)	1
Sabah Shariati (AZE)	1
Naveen Sevlia (UWW)	0
Fardin Hedayati (IRI)	3

Round of 16
Moisés Pérez (VEN)	5
Vladyslav Voronyi (UKR)	10
Alin Alexuc-Ciurariu (ROU)	0
Dáriusz Vitek (HUN)	2
Jello Krahmer (GER)	1
Beka Kandelaki (AZE)	3
Konsta Mäenpää (FIN)	1
Meng Lingzhe (CHN)	9

Quarterfinals
Vladyslav Voronyi (UKR)	0
Dáriusz Vitek (HUN)	7
Beka Kandelaki (AZE)	1
Meng Lingzhe (CHN)	2

Semifinals
Dáriusz Vitek (HUN)	1
Meng Lingzhe (CHN)	5

Bottom half

Qualification
Franz Richter (GER)	9
Boris Petrušić (SRB)	0
Mantas Knystautas (LTU)	2
Romas Fridrikas (LTU)	0
Fardin Hedayati (IRI)	9
László Darabos (HUN)	0
Adam Coon (USA)	2
Oleksandr Chernetskyi (UKR)	3

Round of 16
Kiryl Hryshchanka (AIN)	1
Franz Richter (GER)	3
Mantas Knystautas (LTU)	4
Sulkhan Buidze (GEO)	3
Jiang Wenhao (CHN)	1
Fardin Hedayati (IRI)	3
Oleksandr Chernetskyi (UKR)	2
Óscar Pino (CUB)	11

Quarterfinals
Franz Richter (GER)	2
Mantas Knystautas (LTU)	3
Fardin Hedayati (IRI)	8
Óscar Pino (CUB)	2

Semifinals
Mantas Knystautas (LTU)	0
Fardin Hedayati (IRI)	8

Repechage round 1
Jiang Wenhao (CHN)	1
László Darabos (HUN)	5

Repechage round 2
Konsta Mäenpää (FIN)	1
Beka Kandelaki (AZE)	8
Óscar Pino (CUB)
László Darabos (HUN)	WO

Bronze medals
Dáriusz Vitek (HUN)	7
Beka Kandelaki (AZE)	4
Mantas Knystautas (LTU)	WO
László Darabos (HUN)

== See also ==
- 2024 Grand Prix Zagreb Open – Women's freestyle
