= 2022 U23 World Wrestling Championships – Men's Greco-Roman 82 kg =

Wrestling competitions

Men's Greco-Roman 82 kg at the 2022 U23 World Championships
- Venue: Pontevedra Municipal Sports Hall
- Dates: 18–19 October
- Competitors: 24 from 24 nations

Medalists
gold medal	Exauce Mukubu	Norway
silver medal	Karlo Kodrić	Croatia
bronze medal	Lukas Ahlgren	Sweden
bronze medal	Beka Guruli	Georgia

The men's Greco-Roman 82 kilograms is a competition featured at the 2022 U23 World Wrestling Championships, and was held in Pontevedra, Spain on 18 and 19 October 2022. The qualification rounds were held on 18 October while medal matches were held on the 2nd day of the competition. A total of 24 wrestlers competed in this event, limited to athletes whose body weight was less than 72 kilograms.

This Greco-Roman wrestling competition consists of a single-elimination tournament, with a repechage used to determine the winner of two bronze medals. The two finalists face off for gold and silver medals. Each wrestler who loses to one of the two finalists moves into the repechage, culminating in a pair of bronze medal matches featuring the semifinal losers each facing the remaining repechage opponent from their half of the bracket.

== Results ==
Legend

- F — Won by fall
- R — Retired
- WO — Won by walkover

=== Final ===
Final
Exauce Mukubu (NOR)	10
Karlo Kodrić (CRO)	1

=== Top half ===
Round of 32
Ilias Pagkalidis (GRE)	2
Gagik Hakobyan (ARM)	1
Jonni Sarkkinen (FIN)	3
Péter Dömök (HUN)	1
Exauce Mukubu (NOR)	4
Ranet Kaljola (EST)	0
Adam Gardzioła (POL)	0
Eric Löser (GER)	6

Round of 16
José Miguel Estévez (ESP)	0
Ilias Pagkalidis (GRE)	11
Jonni Sarkkinen (FIN)	2
Lukas Ahlgren (SWE)	11
~~Rohit Dahiya (IND)~~
Exauce Mukubu (NOR)	WO
Eric Löser (GER)	5^{F}
Ivaylo Ivanov (BUL)	1

Quarterfinals
Ilias Pagkalidis (GRE)	3
Lukas Ahlgren (SWE)	5
Exauce Mukubu (NOR)	5
Eric Löser (GER)	0

Semifinals
Lukas Ahlgren (SWE)	0
Exauce Mukubu (NOR)	11

=== Bottom half ===
Round of 32
Alireza Mohmadi (IRI)	4
Ali Hunç (TUR)	7
Toýly Orazow (TKM)	2
Tesshin Higuchi (JPN)	11
Beksultan Nazarbaev (KGZ)	5
Madamin Mirzoiev (UKR)	1
Semion Brekkeli (MDA)	9
Tyler Cunningham (USA)	1

Round of 16
Karlo Kodrić (CRO)	5
Ali Hunç (TUR)	0
Tesshin Higuchi (JPN)	WO
~~Jones Mabungu (ANG)~~
Temirkhan Baiganin (KAZ)	0^{R}
Beksultan Nazarbaev (KGZ)	1
Semion Brekkeli (MDA)	2
Beka Guruli (GEO)	10

Quarterfinals
Karlo Kodrić (CRO)	8
Tesshin Higuchi (JPN)	0
Beksultan Nazarbaev (KGZ)	1
Beka Guruli (GEO)	1

Semifinals
Karlo Kodrić (CRO)	6
Beka Guruli (GEO)	5

=== Repechage ===
Repechage round 1
Ranet Kaljola (EST)	WO
~~Rohit Dahiya (IND)~~

Repechage round 2
Ranet Kaljola (EST)	6
Eric Löser (GER)	2
Ali Hunç (TUR)	10
Tesshin Higuchi (JPN)	1

Bronze medals
Ranet Kaljola (EST)	1
Lukas Ahlgren (SWE)	7
Ali Hunç (TUR)	0
Beka Guruli (GEO)	9

== Final standing ==
Rank	Athlete
1st place, gold medalist(s)	Exauce Mukubu (NOR)
2nd place, silver medalist(s)	Karlo Kodrić (CRO)
3rd place, bronze medalist(s)	Lukas Ahlgren (SWE)
3rd place, bronze medalist(s)	Beka Guruli (GEO)
5	Ranet Kaljola (EST)
5	Ali Hunç (TUR)
7	Tesshin Higuchi (JPN)
8	Eric Löser (GER)
9	Beksultan Nazarbaev (KGZ)
10	Ilias Pagkalidis (GRE)
11	Semion Brekkeli (MDA)
12	Jonni Sarkkinen (FIN)
13	Alireza Mohmadi (IRI)
14	Toýly Orazow (TKM)
15	Gagik Hakobyan (ARM)
16	Péter Dömök (HUN)
17	Madamin Mirzoiev (UKR)
18	Tyler Cunningham (USA)
19	Ivaylo Ivanov (BUL)
20	Temirkhan Baiganin (KAZ)
21	Adam Gardzioła (POL)
22	José Miguel Estévez (ESP)
—	Rohit Dahiya (IND)
—	Jones Mabungu (ANG)
