= 2024 U23 World Wrestling Championships – Men's freestyle 57 kg =

Wrestling competitions

Men's freestyle 57 kg at the 2024 U23 World Championships
- Venue: Tirana Olympic Park
- Dates: 26–27 October
- Competitors: 19 from 17 nations

Medalists
gold medal	Chirag Chikkara	India
silver medal	Abdymalik Karachov	Kyrgyzstan
bronze medal	Iunus Iavbatirov	Authorised Neutral Athletes
bronze medal	Ali Momeni	Iran

The men's freestyle 57 kilograms is a competition featured at the 2024 U23 World Wrestling Championships, and will be held in Tirana, Albania on 25 and 26 October 2024.

This freestyle wrestling competition consists of a single-elimination tournament, with a repechage used to determine the winner of two bronze medals. The two finalists face off for gold and silver medals. Each wrestler who loses to one of the two finalists moves into the repechage, culminating in a pair of bronze medal matches featuring the semifinal losers each facing the remaining repechage opponent from their half of the bracket.

== Results ==
Legend

- F — Won by fall

=== Final ===
Final
Chirag Chikkara (IND)	4
Abdymalik Karachov (KGZ)	2

=== Top half ===
Round of 32
Iunus Iavbatirov (AIN)	11
Thomas Epp (SUI)	0

Round of 16
Chirag Chikkara (IND)	6
Gakuto Ozawa (JPN)	1
Iunus Iavbatirov (AIN)	8
Ivaylo Tisov (BUL)	3
Vladyslav Abramov (UKR)	5
Sarantuyaagiin Jigüür (MGL)	8
Allan Oralbek (KAZ)	8
Luka Gvinjilia (GEO)	5

Quarterfinals
Chirag Chikkara (IND)	12
Iunus Iavbatirov (AIN)	2
Sarantuyaagiin Jigüür (MGL)	3
Allan Oralbek (KAZ)	3

Semifinals
Chirag Chikkara (IND)	8
Allan Oralbek (KAZ)	0

=== Bottom half ===
Round of 32
Manvel Khndzrtsyan (ARM)	12
Vasif Baghirov (AZE)	2
Daniil Yushkouski (ANA)	12
Stefan Shterjov (MKD)	6

Round of 16
Rocco Terranova (ITA)	8
Ali Momeni (IRI)	15
Manvel Khndzrtsyan (ARM)	11
Muhammet Karavuş (TUR)	8
Max Gallagher (USA)	10
Daniil Yushkouski (AIN)	0
Abdymalik Karachov (KGZ)	9
Xie Qingkan (CHN)	4

Quarterfinals
Ali Momeni (IRI)	9
Manvel Khndzrtsyan (ARM)	8
Max Gallagher (USA)	1
Abdymalik Karachov (KGZ)	1

Semifinals
Ali Momeni (IRI)	3
Abdymalik Karachov (KGZ)	4

=== Repechage ===
Repechage round 2
Gakuto Ozawa (JPN)	1
Iunus Iavbatirov (AIN)	6
Xie Qingkan (CHN)	1
Max Gallagher (USA)	3

Bronze medals
Iunus Iavbatirov (AIN)	6
Allan Oralbek (KAZ)	2
Max Gallagher (USA)	0
Ali Momeni (IRI)	8

== Final standing ==
Rank	Athlete
1st place, gold medalist(s)	Chirag Chikkara (IND)
2nd place, silver medalist(s)	Abdymalik Karachov (KGZ)
3rd place, bronze medalist(s)	Iunus Iavbatirov (ANA)
3rd place, bronze medalist(s)	Ali Momeni (IRI)
5	Allan Oralbek (KAZ)
5	Max Gallagher (USA)
7	Manvel Khndzrtsyan (ARM)
8	Sarantuyaagiin Jigüür (MGL)
9	Daniil Yushkouski (AIN)
10	Xie Qingkan (CHN)
11	Gakuto Ozawa (JPN)
12	Muhammet Karavuş (TUR)
13	Rocco Terranova (ITA)
14	Stefan Shterjov (MKD)
15	Vladyslav Abramov (UKR)
16	Luka Gvinjilia (GEO)
17	Ivaylo Tisov (BUL)
18	Vasif Baghirov (AZE)
19	Thomas Epp (SUI)
