= 2024 European Wrestling Championships – Men's freestyle 57 kg =

Wrestling competition

Men's freestyle 57 kg at the 2024 European Wrestling Championships
- Venue: Polyvalent Hall
- Location: Bucharest, Romania
- Dates: 16-17 February
- Competitors: 12

Medalists
gold medal	Arsen Harutyunyan	Armenia
silver medal	Muhammet Karavuş	Turkey
bronze medal	Islam Bazarganov	Azerbaijan
bronze medal	Roberti Dingashvili	Georgia

The men's freestyle 57 kg is a competition featured at the 2024 European Wrestling Championships, and was held in Bucharest, Romania on February 16 and 17.

== Results ==
Legend

- F — Won by fall

=== Main bracket ===
Round of 16
Ivaylo Tisov (BUL)	0
Kamil Kerymov (UKR)	10
Aryan Tsiutryn (AIN)	4
Islam Bazarganov (AZE)	6
Răzvan Kovacs (ROU)	10
Igor Chichioi (MDA)	0
Nikolaos Vlandos (GRE)	0
Ilman Mukhtarov (FRA)	8^{F}

Quarterfinals
Arsen Harutyunyan (ARM)	10
Kamil Kerymov (UKR)	0
Islam Bazarganov (AZE)	10
Horst Lehr (GER)	0
Roberti Dingashvili (GEO)	5
Răzvan Kovacs (ROU)	4
Ilman Mukhtarov (FRA)	0
Muhammet Karavuş (TUR)	11

Semifinals
Arsen Harutyunyan (ARM)	10
Islam Bazarganov (AZE)	0
Roberti Dingashvili (GEO)	0
Muhammet Karavuş (TUR)	10

Final
Arsen Harutyunyan (ARM)	10
Muhammet Karavuş (TUR)	0

=== Repechage ===
Bronze medal match
Kamil Kerymov (UKR)	8
Islam Bazarganov (AZE)	10
Ilman Mukhtarov (FRA)	0
Roberti Dingashvili (GEO)	11

== Final standing ==
Rank	Athlete
1st place, gold medalist(s)	Arsen Harutyunyan (ARM)
2nd place, silver medalist(s)	Muhammet Karavuş (TUR)
3rd place, bronze medalist(s)	Islam Bazarganov (AZE)
3rd place, bronze medalist(s)	Roberti Dingashvili (GEO)
5	Kamil Kerymov (UKR)
5	Ilman Mukhtarov (FRA)
7	Răzvan Kovacs (ROU)
8	Aryan Tsiutryn (AIN)
9	Nikolaos Vlandos (GRE)
10	Horst Lehr (GER)
11	Ivaylo Tisov (BUL)
12	Igor Chichioi (MDA)
