= 2021 European Wrestling Championships – Men's freestyle 57 kg =

Wrestling competition

The men's freestyle 57 kg is a competition featured at the 2021 European Wrestling Championships, and was held in Warsaw, Poland on April 19 and April 20.

== Medalists ==
Gold	Süleyman Atlı; Turkey
Silver	Nachyn Mongush; Russia
Bronze	Kamil Kerymov; Ukraine
Bronze	Afgan Khashalov; Azerbaijan

== Results ==
Legend

- F — Won by fall

1/8 finals
Aryan Tsiutryn (BLR)	6
Nachyn Mongush (RUS)	7
Ioannis Martidis (GRE)	0
Afgan Khashalov (AZE)	10
Anatolii Buruian (MDA)	0
Răzvan Kovacs (ROU)	7

Quarterfinals
Mikyay Naim (BUL)	9
Beka Bujiashvili (GEO)	5
Süleyman Atlı (TUR)	11
Kamil Kerymov (UKR)	0
Givi Davidovi (ITA)	1
Nachyn Mongush (RUS)	3
Afgan Khashalov (AZE)	3
Răzvan Kovacs (ROU)	3

Semifinals
Mikyay Naim (BUL)	1
Süleyman Atlı (TUR)	3
Nachyn Mongush (RUS)	2
Afgan Khashalov (AZE)	0

Final
Süleyman Atlı (TUR)	6
Nachyn Mongush (RUS)	5

Repechage round 1
Aryan Tsiutryn (BLR)	4
Givi Davidovi (ITA)	0

Bronze medal match
Kamil Kerymov (UKR)	9
Mikyay Naim (BUL)	4
Aryan Tsiutryn (BLR)	2
Afgan Khashalov (AZE)	2

== Final standing ==
Rank	Athlete
1st place, gold medalist(s)	Süleyman Atlı (TUR)
2nd place, silver medalist(s)	Nachyn Mongush (RUS)
3rd place, bronze medalist(s)	Kamil Kerymov (UKR)
3rd place, bronze medalist(s)	Afgan Khashalov (AZE)
5	Mikyay Naim (BUL)
5	Aryan Tsiutryn (BLR)
7	Răzvan Kovacs (ROU)
8	Beka Bujiashvili (GEO)
9	Givi Davidovi (ITA)
10	Anatolii Buruian (MDA)
11	Ioannis Martidis (GRE)
