= 2023 European Wrestling Championships – Men's freestyle 86 kg =

Wrestling competition

Men's freestyle 86 kg at the 2023 European Wrestling Championships
- Venue: Arena Zagreb
- Location: Zagreb, Croatia
- Dates: 18-19 April
- Competitors: 23

Medalists
gold medal	Dauren Kurugliev	Greece
silver medal	Myles Amine	San Marino
bronze medal	Abubakr Abakarov	Azerbaijan
bronze medal	Sebastian Jezierzański	Poland

The Men's Freestyle 86 kg is a competition featured at the 2023 European Wrestling Championships, and was held in Zagreb, Croatia on April 18 and 19.

== Results ==
Legend

- F — Won by fall

=== Final ===
Final
Dauren Kurugliev (GRE)	3
Myles Amine (SMR)	1

=== Top half ===
Round of 32
Andrei Franț (ROU)	1
Simone Iannattoni (ITA)	2
Dauren Kurugliev (GRE)	11
Patrik Püspöki (HUN)	0
Fatih Erdin (TUR)	2
Ruslan Valiev (FRA)	1

Round of 16
Boris Makoev (SVK)	4
Dejan Mitrov (MKD)	1
Simone Iannattoni (ITA)	0
Benjamin Greil (AUT)	10
Ivars Samušonoks (LAT)	0
Dauren Kurugliev (GRE)	10
Fatih Erdin (TUR)	5
Abubakr Abakarov (AZE)	7

Quarterfinals
Boris Makoev (SVK)	11
Benjamin Greil (AUT)	0
Dauren Kurugliev (GRE)	9
Abubakr Abakarov (AZE)	0

Semifinals
Boris Makoev (SVK)	0
Dauren Kurugliev (GRE)	5

=== Bottom half ===
Round of 32
Georgii Rubaev (MDA)	10^{F}
Mushegh Mkrtchyan (ARM)	0
Ilia Hristov (BUL)	1
Taimuraz Friev (ESP)	2
Domantas Pauliuščenko (LTU)	2
Tariel Gaphrindashvili (GEO)	13
Aimar Andruse (EST)	1
Lars Schäfle (GER)	10

Round of 16
Myles Amine (SMR)	7
Georgii Rubaev (MDA)	0
Taimuraz Friev (ESP)	4
Uri Kalashnikov (ISR)	9
Vladyslav Prus (UKR)	7
Tariel Gaphrindashvili (GEO)	14
Lars Schäfle (GER)	1
Sebastian Jezierzański (POL)	6

Quarterfinals
Myles Amine (SMR)	5
Uri Kalashnikov (ISR)	2
Tariel Gaphrindashvili (GEO)	2
Sebastian Jezierzański (POL)	3

Semifinals
Myles Amine (SMR)	3
Sebastian Jezierzański (POL)	2

Repechage round 1
Patrik Püspöki (HUN)	2
Ivars Samušonoks (LAT)	9

Repechage round 2
Ivars Samušonoks (LAT)	0
Abubakr Abakarov (AZE)	8
Georgii Rubaev (MDA)	5
Uri Kalashnikov (ISR)	0

Bronze medal match
Abubakr Abakarov (AZE)	7
Boris Makoev (SVK)	4
Georgii Rubaev (MDA)	1
Sebastian Jezierzański (POL)	1

== Final standing ==
Rank	Athlete
1st place, gold medalist(s)	Dauren Kurugliev (GRE)
2nd place, silver medalist(s)	Myles Amine (SMR)
3rd place, bronze medalist(s)	Abubakr Abakarov (AZE)
3rd place, bronze medalist(s)	Sebastian Jezierzański (POL)
5	Boris Makoev (SVK)
5	Georgii Rubaev (MDA)
7	Tariel Gaphrindashvili (GEO)
8	Benjamin Greil (AUT)
9	Lars Schäfle (GER)
10	Uri Kalashnikov (ISR)
11	Fatih Erdin (TUR)
12	Taimuraz Friev (ESP)
13	Ivars Samušonoks (LAT)
14	Simone Iannattoni (ITA)
15	Vladyslav Prus (UKR)
16	Domantas Pauliuščenko (LTU)
17	Patrik Püspöki (HUN)
18	Andrei Franț (ROU)
19	Ruslan Valiev (FRA)
20	Ilia Hristov (BUL)
21	Dejan Mitrov (MKD)
22	Aimar Andruse (EST)
23	Mushegh Mkrtchyan (ARM)
