= Wrestling at the 2022 Mediterranean Games – Men's freestyle 57 kg =

Wrestling competitions

Men's Freestyle 57 kg at the 2022 Mediterranean Games
- Venue: EMEC Hall
- Date: 28–29 June
- Competitors: 7 from 7 nations

Medalists
gold medal	Muhammet Karavuş	Turkey
silver medal	Levan Metreveli	Spain
bronze medal	Studd Morris	Italy

The men's freestyle 57 kg competition of the wrestling events at the 2022 Mediterranean Games in Oran, Algeria, was held from 27 June to 28 June at the EMEC Hall.

== Results ==
27 June

=== Elimination groups ===
==== Group A ====
Pos	Athlete	Pld	W	L	CP	TP
1	Valentin Damour (FRA)	3	3	0	11	31
2	Studd Morris (ITA)	3	2	1	9	18
3	Gamal Mohamed (EGY)	3	1	2	6	16
4	Nikolaos Vlantos (GRE)	3	0	3	0	0

Source: Oran 2022

	Score		CP
Gamal Mohamed (EGY)	1–12	Valentin Damour (FRA)	1–4 VSU1
Nikolaos Vlantos (GRE)	0–6 Fall	Studd Morris (ITA)	0–5 VFA
Gamal Mohamed (EGY)	10–0	Nikolaos Vlantos (GRE)	4–0 VSU
Valentin Damour (FRA)	8–2	Studd Morris (ITA)	3–1 VPO1
Studd Morris (ITA)	10–5	Gamal Mohamed (EGY)	3–1 VPO1
Valentin Damour (FRA)	11–0	Nikolaos Vlantos (GRE)	4–0 VSU

==== Group B ====
Pos	Athlete	Pld	W	L	CP	TP
1	Muhammet Karavuş (TUR)	2	2	0	8	13
2	Levan Metreveli (ESP)	2	1	1	4	7
—	Salaheddine Kateb (ALG)	2	0	2	1	3

Source: Oran 2022

	Score		CP
Levan Metreveli (ESP)	2–7	Muhammet Karavuş (TUR)	1–3 VPO1
Salaheddine Kateb (ALG)	3–3	Levan Metreveli (ESP)	1–3 VPO1
Muhammet Karavuş (TUR)	6–0 DQ	~~Salaheddine Kateb (ALG)~~	5–0 DSQ

Semifinals
Valentin Damour (FRA)	4
Levan Metreveli (ESP)	8^{F}
Studd Morris (ITA)	0
Muhammet Karavuş (TUR)	10

Final
Levan Metreveli (ESP)	2
Muhammet Karavuş (TUR)	9
Bronze medal
Valentin Damour (FRA)	2
Studd Morris (ITA)	10
