= 2025 World Wrestling Championships – Men's Greco-Roman 87 kg =

Wrestling competitions

Men's Greco-Roman 87 kg at the 2025 World Championships
- Venue: Arena Zagreb
- Dates: 20–21 September 2025
- Competitors: 30 from 28 nations

Medalists
gold medal	Aleksandr Komarov	Serbia
silver medal	Alireza Mohmadi	Iran
bronze medal	Asan Zhanyshov	Kyrgyzstan
bronze medal	Milad Alirzaev

The men's Greco-Roman 87 kilograms is a competition featured at the 2025 World Wrestling Championships, and was held in Zagreb, Croatia on 20 and 21 September 2025.

This Greco-Roman wrestling competition consists of a single-elimination tournament, with a repechage used to determine the winner of two bronze medals. The two finalists face off for gold and silver medals. Each wrestler who loses to one of the two finalists moves into the repechage, culminating in a pair of bronze medal matches, featuring the semifinal losers each facing the remaining repechage opponent from their half of the bracket.

== Results ==
Legend

- F — Won by fall

=== Final ===
Final
Alireza Mohmadi (IRI)	3
Aleksandr Komarov (SRB)	4

=== Top half ===
Round of 32
Patrik Gordan (ROU)	0
Ivan Huklek (CRO)	9
Yaroslav Filchakov (UKR)	8
Erion Ramljak (AUS)	0
Mukhammadkodir Rasulov (UZB)	1
Marcel Sterkenburg (NED)	4
Islam Abbasov (AZE)	8
Stanislau Shafarenka (UWW)	0
Hasan Berk Kılınç (TUR)	5
Asan Zhanyshov (KGZ)	6
Daniel Aleksandrov (BUL)	4
Luis Avendaño (VEN)	0
Hannes Wagner (GER)	1
Alireza Mohmadi (IRI)	5

Round of 16
Dávid Losonczi (HUN)	5
Ivan Huklek (CRO)	3
Yaroslav Filchakov (UKR)	4
Marcel Sterkenburg (NED)	3
Islam Abbasov (AZE)	3
Asan Zhanyshov (KGZ)	4
Daniel Aleksandrov (BUL)	3
Alireza Mohmadi (IRI)	11

Quarterfinals
Dávid Losonczi (HUN)	6
Yaroslav Filchakov (UKR)	2
Asan Zhanyshov (KGZ)	1
Alireza Mohmadi (IRI)	4

Semifinals
Dávid Losonczi (HUN)	3
Alireza Mohmadi (IRI)	6

=== Bottom half ===
Round of 32
Aleksandr Komarov (SRB)	5
So Sakabe (JPN)	3
Karan Kamboj (IND)	0
Payton Jacobson (USA)	8
Islam Yevloyev (KAZ)	9
Lasha Gobadze (GEO)	1
Vigen Nazaryan (ARM)	1
Exauce Mukubu (NOR)	1
Milad Alirzaev (UWW)	4
Luo Jianwen (CHN)	0
Park Sang-hyeok (KOR)	5
Damian von Euw (SUI)	6
Szymon Szymonowicz (POL)	10
Hamza Sertcanli (SWE)	1

Round of 16
Aleksandr Komarov (SRB)	5
Payton Jacobson (USA)	1
Islam Yevloyev (KAZ)	3
Vigen Nazaryan (ARM)	1
Milad Alirzaev (UWW)	6
Damian von Euw (SUI)	4
Szymon Szymonowicz (POL)	0
Turpal Bisultanov (DEN)	5

Quarterfinals
Aleksandr Komarov (SRB)	1
Islam Yevloyev (KAZ)	1
Milad Alirzaev (UWW)	7
Turpal Bisultanov (DEN)	1

Semifinals
Aleksandr Komarov (SRB)	1
Milad Alirzaev (UWW)	1

=== Repechage ===
Repechage round 1
Hannes Wagner (GER)	4
Daniel Aleksandrov (BUL)	1
So Sakabe (JPN)	1
Payton Jacobson (USA)	9

Repechage round 2
Hannes Wagner (GER)	1
Asan Zhanyshov (KGZ)	1
Payton Jacobson (USA)	1
Islam Yevloyev (KAZ)	5

Bronze medals
Asan Zhanyshov (KGZ)	4
Dávid Losonczi (HUN)	2
Islam Yevloyev (KAZ)	1
Milad Alirzaev (UWW)	5^{F}

== Final standing ==
Rank	Athlete
1st place, gold medalist(s)	Aleksandr Komarov (SRB)
2nd place, silver medalist(s)	Alireza Mohmadi (IRI)
3rd place, bronze medalist(s)	Asan Zhanyshov (KGZ)
3rd place, bronze medalist(s)	Milad Alirzaev (UWW)
5	Dávid Losonczi (HUN)
5	Islam Yevloyev (KAZ)
7	Payton Jacobson (USA)
8	Yaroslav Filchakov (UKR)
9	Ivan Huklek (CRO)
10	Islam Abbasov (AZE)
11	Daniel Aleksandrov (BUL)
12	Hannes Wagner (GER)
13	Szymon Szymonowicz (POL)
14	Damian von Euw (SUI)
15	Marcel Sterkenburg (NED)
16	Turpal Bisultanov (DEN)
17	Vigen Nazaryan (ARM)
18	So Sakabe (JPN)
19	Hasan Berk Kılınç (TUR)
20	Park Sang-hyeok (KOR)
21	Exauce Mukubu (NOR)
22	Mukhammadkodir Rasulov (UZB)
23	Lasha Gobadze (GEO)
24	Hamza Sertcanli (SWE)
25	Luis Avendaño (VEN)
26	Luo Jianwen (CHN)
27	Erion Ramljak (AUS)
28	Stanislau Shafarenka (UWW)
29	Karan Kamboj (IND)
30	Patrik Gordan (ROU)
