= 2024 U23 World Wrestling Championships – Men's freestyle 125 kg =

Wrestling competitions

Men's freestyle 125 kg at the 2024 U23 World Championships
- Venue: Tirana Olympic Park
- Dates: 25–26 October
- Competitors: 20 from 18 nations

Medalists
gold medal	Amir Reza Masoumi	Iran
silver medal	Alen Khubulov	Bulgaria
bronze medal	Abdulla Kurbanov	Authorised Neutral Athletes
bronze medal	Volodymyr Kochanov	Ukraine

The men's freestyle 125 kilograms is a competition featured at the 2024 U23 World Wrestling Championships, and will be held in Tirana, Albania on 25 and 26 October 2024.

This freestyle wrestling competition consists of a single-elimination tournament, with a repechage used to determine the winner of two bronze medals. The two finalists face off for gold and silver medals. Each wrestler who loses to one of the two finalists moves into the repechage, culminating in a pair of bronze medal matches featuring the semifinal losers each facing the remaining repechage opponent from their half of the bracket.

== Results ==
Legend

- DSQ — Disqualification
- F — Won by fall
- WO — Won by walkover

=== Final ===
Final
Amir Reza Masoumi (IRI)	11
Alen Khubulov (BUL)	0

=== Top half ===
Round of 32
Jonovan Smith (PUR)	0
Abdulla Kurbanov (AIN)	11
~~Lyova Gevorgyan (ARM)~~	1^{DSQ}
~~Hakan Büyükçıngıl (TUR)~~	0^{DSQ}

Round of 16
Anirudh Kumar (IND)	0
Amir Reza Masoumi (IRI)	10
Abdulla Kurbanov (AIN)	6
Solomon Manashvili (GEO)	0
Pavel Dziatlau (AIN)	WO
Bye
Nicolae Stratulat (MDA)	1
Lucas Stoddard (USA)	8

Quarterfinals
Amir Reza Masoumi (IRI)	10
Abdulla Kurbanov (AIN)	0
Pavel Dziatlau (AIN)	1
Lucas Stoddard (USA)	1

Semifinals
Amir Reza Masoumi (IRI)	10
Lucas Stoddard (USA)	0

=== Bottom half ===
Round of 32
Enkhtüvshingiin Batmagnai (MGL)	4
Omar Ihab Sarem (SYR)	2
Wang Jinhai (CHN)	0
Aydin Ahmadov (AZE)	11

Round of 16
Omarkhan Nadirov (KAZ)	2
Alen Khubulov (BUL)	6
Enkhtüvshingiin Batmagnai (MGL)	4
Volodymyr Kochanov (UKR)	7^{F}
Michał Dubowski (POL)	4
Aydin Ahmadov (AZE)	5
Toyoki Hamada (JPN)	10
Jorawar Dhinsa (CAN)	0

Quarterfinals
Alen Khubulov (BUL)	6
Volodymyr Kochanov (UKR)	1
Aydin Ahmadov (AZE)	4
Toyoki Hamada (JPN)	2

Semifinals
Alen Khubulov (BUL)	10
Aydin Ahmadov (AZE)	0

=== Repechage ===
Repechage round 2
Anirudh Kumar (IND)	2
Abdulla Kurbanov (AIN)	12
Omarkhan Nadirov (KAZ)	2
Volodymyr Kochanov (UKR)	12

Bronze medals
Abdulla Kurbanov (AIN)	10
Lucas Stoddard (USA)	0
Volodymyr Kochanov (UKR)	11
Aydin Ahmadov (AZE)	0

== Final standing ==
Rank	Athlete
1st place, gold medalist(s)	Amir Reza Masoumi (IRI)
2nd place, silver medalist(s)	Alen Khubulov (BUL)
3rd place, bronze medalist(s)	Abdulla Kurbanov (AIN)
3rd place, bronze medalist(s)	Volodymyr Kochanov (UKR)
5	Lucas Stoddard (USA)
5	Aydin Ahmadov (AZE)
7	Pavel Dziatlau (AIN)
8	Toyoki Hamada (JPN)
9	Enkhtüvshingiin Batmagnai (MGL)
10	Omarkhan Nadirov (KAZ)
11	Michał Dubowski (POL)
12	Omar Ihab Sarem (SYR)
13	Anirudh Kumar (IND)
14	Nicolae Stratulat (MDA)
15	Solomon Manashvili (GEO)
16	Jorawar Dhinsa (CAN)
17	Jonovan Smith (PUR)
18	Wang Jinhai (CHN)
DSQ	Lyova Gevorgyan (ARM)
DSQ	Hakan Büyükçıngıl (TUR)
