= 2022 U23 World Wrestling Championships – Men's freestyle 125 kg =

Wrestling competitions

Men's freestyle 125 kg at the 2022 U23 World Championships
- Venue: Pontevedra Municipal Sports Hall
- Dates: 22–23 October
- Competitors: 16 from 16 nations

Medalists
gold medal	Amir Reza Masoumi	Iran
silver medal	Solomon Manashvili	Georgia
bronze medal	Alisher Yergali	Kazakhstan
bronze medal	Tony Cassioppi	United States

The men's freestyle 125 kg is a competition featured at the 2022 U23 World Wrestling Championships, and was held in Pontevedra, Spain on 22 and 23 October 2022. The qualification rounds were held on 20 October while medal matches were held on the 2nd day of the competition. A total of 16 wrestlers competed in this event, limited to athletes whose body weight was less than 125 kilograms.

This freestyle wrestling competition consists of a single-elimination tournament, with a repechage used to determine the winner of two bronze medals. The two finalists face off for gold and silver medals. Each wrestler who loses to one of the two finalists moves into the repechage, culminating in a pair of bronze medal matches featuring the semifinal losers each facing the remaining repechage opponent from their half of the bracket.

== Results ==
Legend

- F — Won by fall

=== Main bracket ===
Round of 16
Georgi Ivanov (BUL)	1
Vakhit Galayev (AZE)	4
Alisher Yergali (KAZ)	10
Zyýamuhammet Saparow (TKM)	0
Amir Reza Masoumi (IRI)	11
Adil Mısırcı (TUR)	0
Jonovan Smith (PUR)	1
Milán Korcsog (HUN)	3
Azamat Khosonov (GRE)	10
Carlos Acebrón (ESP)	0
Jackson Serna (CAN)	0
Yurii Idzinskyi (UKR)	10
Tony Cassioppi (USA)	10
Lior Altshuler (ISR)	0
Solomon Manashvili (GEO)	10
Kai Shutto (JPN)	0

Quarterfinals
Vakhit Galayev (AZE)	4
Alisher Yergali (KAZ)	5
Amir Reza Masoumi (IRI)	10
Milán Korcsog (HUN)	0
Azamat Khosonov (GRE)	5
Yurii Idzinskyi (UKR)	8
Tony Cassioppi (USA)	4
Solomon Manashvili (GEO)	16

Semifinals
Alisher Yergali (KAZ)	3
Amir Reza Masoumi (IRI)	6
Yurii Idzinskyi (UKR)	0
Solomon Manashvili (GEO)	10

Final
Amir Reza Masoumi (IRI)	13
Solomon Manashvili (GEO)	2

=== Repechage ===
Repechage round
Adil Mısırcı (TUR)	0
Milán Korcsog (HUN)	3
Kai Shutto (JPN)	0
Tony Cassioppi (USA)	4^{F}

Bronze medals
Milán Korcsog (HUN)	1
Alisher Yergali (KAZ)	6
Tony Cassioppi (USA)	WO
Yurii Idzinskyi (UKR)

== Final standing ==
Rank	Athlete
1st place, gold medalist(s)	Amir Reza Masoumi (IRI)
2nd place, silver medalist(s)	Solomon Manashvili (GEO)
3rd place, bronze medalist(s)	Alisher Yergali (KAZ)
3rd place, bronze medalist(s)	Tony Cassioppi (USA)
5	Milán Korcsog (HUN)
5	Yurii Idzinskyi (UKR)
7	Azamat Khosonov (GRE)
8	Vakhit Galayev (AZE)
9	Jonovan Smith (PUR)
10	Georgi Ivanov (BUL)
11	Zyýamuhammet Saparow (TKM)
12	Carlos Acebrón (ESP)
13	Jackson Serna (CAN)
14	Lior Altshuler (ISR)
15	Adil Mısırcı (TUR)
16	Kai Shutto (JPN)
