= Selim Yaşar =

Ingush-born Russian-Turkish wrestler

Selim Yaşar Koloi Kartoev Зелимхан Картоев Колой Картоев
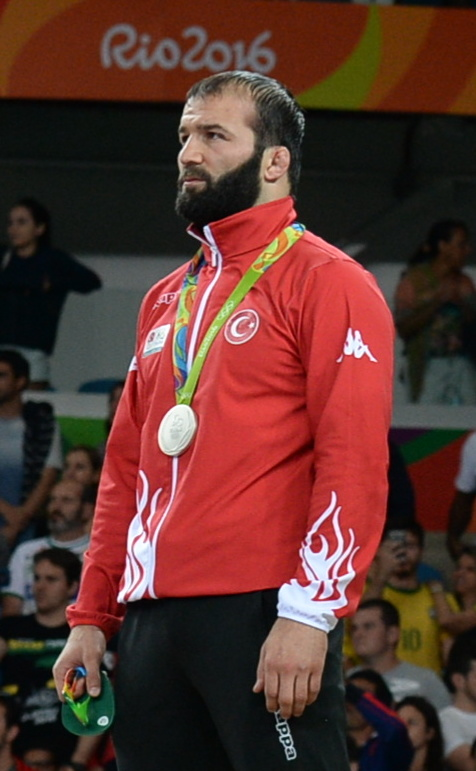
- Yaşar in 2016

Personal information
- Full name: Koloi Mikailovich Kartoev
- National team: Turkey
- Citizenship: Russian; Turkish
- Born: 20 February 1990 (age 36) Dolakova, Nazranovsky District, Ingushetia, Russia
- Height: 1.80 m (5 ft 11 in)
- Weight: 86 kg (190 lb)

Sport
- Country: Russia; Turkey
- Sport: Wrestling
- Rank: Number two in the ranking UWW (in 2015,2016), International Master of Sports.
- Event: Freestyle
- Club: Krasnodar FS Team; RNO-Alania Wrestling Camp
- Coached by: Adam Barakhoev, Abdullah Magomedov, Ovik Safaryan (RUS)
Medal record
Representing Turkey
Men's Freestyle wrestling
Olympic Games
Silver medal – second place	2016 Rio de Janeiro	86 kg
World Championships
Bronze medal – third place	2014 Tashkent	86 kg
Silver medal – second place	2015 Las Vegas	86 kg
European Championships
Bronze medal – third place	2017 Novi Sad	-86 kg
Islamic Solidarity Games
Silver medal – second place	2017 Baku	86 kg
Yasar Dogu Tournament
Gold medal – first place	2021 Istanbul	92 kg
Gold medal – first place	2020 Istanbul	86 kg
Bronze medal – third place	2019 Istanbul	86 kg
Silver medal – second place	2018 Istanbul	86 kg
Silver medal – second place	2016 Istanbul	86 kg
Representing Russia
Junior World Championships
Gold medal – first place	2009 Ankara	84 kg
Junior European Championships
Gold medal – first place	2010 Samokov	84 kg
Gold medal – first place	2009 Tbilisi	84 kg

Koloi Mikailovich Kartoev (Russian: Колой Микаилович Картоев; born 20 February 1990), also known as Selim Yaşar or Zelimkhan Kartoev, is a Russian-Turkish former freestyle wrestler, junior and cadet World Champion. He was a runner-up at the 2015 World Wrestling Championships and bronze medalist at the 2014 World Wrestling Championships. He won the gold medal at the Wenceslas Ziolkowski Memorial XLIX. He is a Turkish national wrestling champion. He won a silver medal at the 2016 Summer Olympics, losing to Russian Abdulrashid Sadulaev in the final bout. Yaşar was a bronze medalist at the 2017 European Wrestling Championships in Novi Sad, Serbia.
