= Milad Alirzaev =

Russian Greco-Roman wrestler

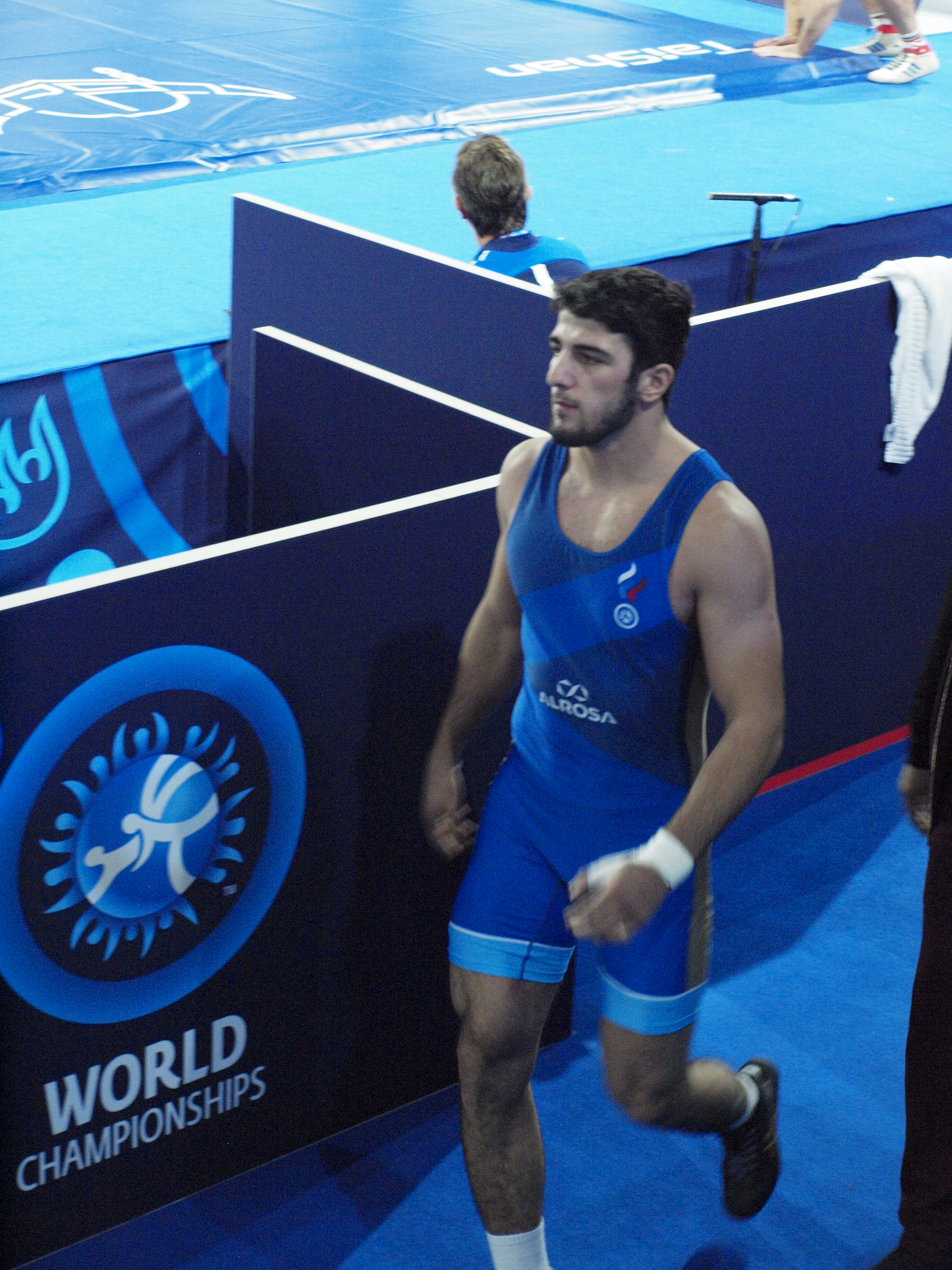
- Milad Alirzaev at the 2021 World Wrestling Championships in Oslo, Norway

Personal information
- Full name: Milad Valerikovich Alirzaev
- Nationality: Russia
- Born: Rutulsky District, Dagestan, Russia
- Weight: 87 kg (192 lb)

Sport
- Country: Russia
- Sport: Amateur wrestling
- Event: Greco-Roman
Medal record
Men's Greco-Roman wrestling
Representing UWW
World Championships
Bronze medal – third place	2025 Zagreb	87 kg
Grand Prix
Bronze medal – third place	2026 Tirana	87 kg
Representing Individual Neutral Athletes
Vehbi Emre & Hamit Kaplan Tournament
Gold medal – first place	2024 Antalya	87 kg
Grand Prix
Gold medal – first place	2024 Zagreb	87 kg
Gold medal – first place	2024 Mladenovac	87 kg
Representing Russia
European Championships
Bronze medal – third place	2021 Warsaw	87 kg
Individual World Cup
Gold medal – first place	2020 Belgrade	82 kg
World U23 Championships
Gold medal – first place	2019 Budapest	82 kg

Milad Alirzaev (Russian: Милад Валерикович Алирзаев; born 13 June 1998) is a Russian Greco-Roman wrestler. He is a bronze medalist at the European Wrestling Championships.

== Career ==
In 2019, he won the gold medal in the 82 kg event at the World U23 Wrestling Championship in Budapest, Hungary. He won the gold medal in the 82 kg event at the 2020 Individual Wrestling World Cup held in Belgrade, Serbia.

In 2021, he won one of the bronze medals in the 87 kg event at the European Wrestling Championships held in Warsaw, Poland.

He competed at the 2024 European Wrestling Olympic Qualification Tournament in Baku, Azerbaijan and he earned a quota place for the Individual Neutral Athletes for the 2024 Summer Olympics in Paris, France. In July 2024, the Russian Wrestling Federation announced that Russian wrestlers would not take part after a unanimous decision to refuse to participate.

== Achievements ==
Year	Tournament	Venue	Result	Event
2021	European Championships	Warsaw, Poland	3rd	Greco-Roman 87 kg
