= Nachyn Mongush =

Russian freestyle wrestler

Personal information
- Full name: Nachyn Olzeevich Mongush
- Nationality: Russia
- Born: 28 January 2000 (age 26) Tuva, Russia
- Height: 170 cm (5 ft 7 in)

Sport
- Country: Russia
- Sport: Wrestling
- Weight class: 57 kg
- Event: Freestyle

Achievements and titles
- Regional finals: (gold) (2025)
- National finals: (silver) (2021) (silver) (2022)
Medal record
Men's freestyle wrestling
Representing United World Wrestling
European Championships
Gold medal – first place	2025 Bratislava	57 kg
Grand Prix
Silver medal – second place	2025 Tirana	61 kg
Representing Russia
European Championships
Silver medal – second place	2021 Warsaw	57 kg
World Military Championships
Gold medal – first place	2021 Tehran	61 kg
European Juniors Championships
Gold medal – first place	2019 Pontevedra	57 kg
Representing Individual Neutral Athletes
Yasar Dogu Tournament
Silver medal – second place	2024 Antalya	57 kg
U23 World Championships
Gold medal – first place	2023 Tirana	57 kg
Representing Tuva
Russian National Championships
Silver medal – second place	2022 Kyzyl	57 kg
Silver medal – second place	2021 Ulan-Ude	57 kg
Bronze medal – third place	2023 Kaspiysk	57 kg
Golden Grand Prix Ivan Yarygin
Gold medal – first place	2025 Krasnoyarsk	57 kg

Nachyn Olzeevich Mongush (born 28 January 2000) is a Russian freestyle wrestler who currently competes at 57 kilograms and represents Tuva in the national circuit. Mongush was a silver medalist at the 2021 European Continental Championships and the 2021 Russian National Championships.

== Major results ==
Year	Competition	Venue	Position	Event	Notes
Representing Russia
2022	Russian National Championships	Kyzyl, Russia	2nd	Freestyle 57 kg	
2021	World Military Championships	Tehran, Iran	1st	Freestyle 57 kg	
2021	European Championships	Warsaw, Poland	2nd	Freestyle 57 kg	
2021	Russian National Championships	Ulan-Ude, Russia	2nd	Freestyle 57 kg	
2019	European Juniors Championships	Pontevedra, Spain	1st	Freestyle 57 kg	
