= Amir Reza Masoumi =

Iranian wrestler (born 2004)

Amirreza Masoumi

Personal information
- Native name: امیررضا معصومی
- Full name: Amirreza Masoumi Valadi
- Nationality: Iran
- Born: 16 September 2004 (age 22) Sowme'eh Sara, Gilan, Iran
- Height: 199 cm (6 ft 6 in)

Sport
- Country: Iran
- Sport: Wrestling
- Weight class: 125 kg
- Event: Freestyle
Medal record
Men's freestyle wrestling
Representing Azerbaijan
Grand Prix
Gold medal – first place	2026 Baku	125 kg
Gold medal – first place	2026 Quba	125 kg
Gold medal – first place	2026 Goygol	125 kg
Representing Iran
Asian Championships
Gold medal – first place	2025 Amman	125 kg
World Cup
Silver medal – second place	2022 Coralville	Team
Yasar Dogu Tournament
Gold medal – first place	2024 Antalya	125 kg
Grand Prix
Gold medal – first place	2022 Tonekabon	125 kg
Gold medal – first place	2025 Zagreb	125 kg
Silver medal – second place	2023 Urmia	125 kg
Silver medal – second place	2024 Zagreb	125 kg
Silver medal – second place	2025 Shiraz	125 kg
World U23 Championships
Gold medal – first place	2022 Pontevedra	125 kg
Gold medal – first place	2024 Tirana	125 kg
World Juniors Championships
Gold medal – first place	2022 Sofia	125 kg
Gold medal – first place	2023 Amman	125 kg
Gold medal – first place	2024 Pontevedra	125 kg
Asian Juniors Championships
Gold medal – first place	2024 Sriracha	125 kg
World Cadets Championships
Gold medal – first place	2021 Budapest	110 kg

Amirreza Masoumi (born 16 September 2004 in Gillan, Iran) is an Iranian wrestler. He competed and represented Iran in the 2022 U23 World Wrestling Championships at Pontevedra, Spain, where he won the gold medal in his event. in late 2025 he signed a contract to Join the Azerbaijan wrestling national team and will represent them starting 2027 His father Fardin Masoumi was a wrestler too.

== Achievements ==
- Coralville, Iowa, United States – (gold) 2022
- Pontevedra Spain– (gold) 2022
- Sofia Bulgaria – (gold) 2022
