= Dauren Kurugliev =

Russian-born Greek freestyle wrestler (born 1992)

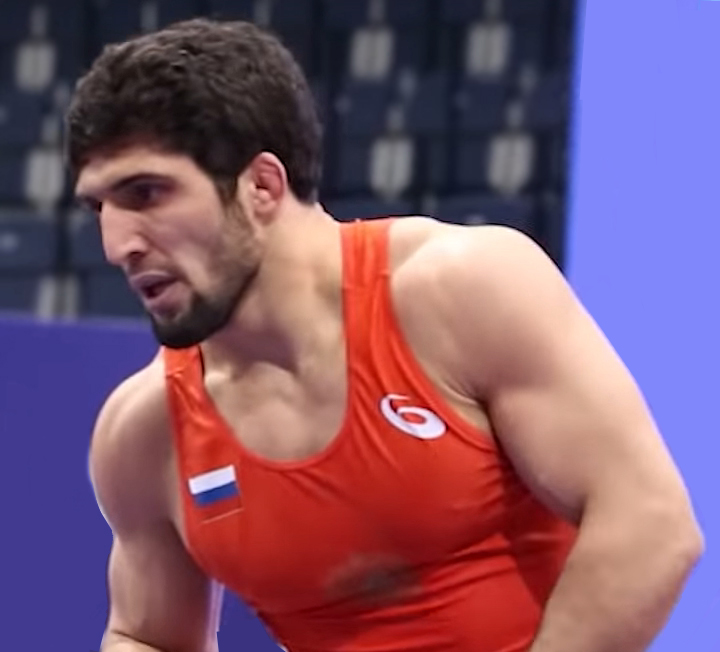
- Kurugliev in 2020

Personal information
- Native name: Даурен Халидович Куруглиев
- Full name: Dauren Khalidovich Kurugliev
- National team: Russia (until 2022); Greece (since 2023)
- Born: 12 July 1992 (age 34) Derbent, Dagestan, Russia
- Height: 1.78 m (5 ft 10 in)

Sport
- Sport: Wrestling
- Weight class: 86 kg
- Event: Freestyle
- Club: Gamid Gamidova wrestling club
- Coached by: Gaidar Gaidarov

Achievements and titles
- World finals: 5th (2018)
- Regional finals: (gold) (2017) (gold) (2019) (gold) (2023)
Medal record
Men's freestyle wrestling
Representing Greece
Olympic Games
Bronze medal – third place	2024 Paris	86 kg
European Championships
Gold medal – first place	2023 Zagreb	86 kg
Gold medal – first place	2024 Bucharest	86 kg
Gold medal – first place	2025 Bratislava	92 kg
Grand Prix
Silver medal – second place	2023 Budapest	86 kg
Mediterranean Games
Gold medal – first place	2026 Taranto	97 kg
Representing Russia
Individual World Cup
Gold medal – first place	2020 Belgrade	86 kg
World Cup
Gold medal – first place	2019 Yakutsk	86 kg
European Games
Gold medal – first place	2019 Minsk	86 kg
European Championships
Gold medal – first place	2017 Novi Sad	86 kg
Representing Dagestan
Russian Championships
Gold medal – first place	2020 Naro-Fominsk	86 kg
Gold medal – first place	2018 Odintsovo	86 kg
Silver medal – second place	2021 Ulan-Ude	86 kg
Golden Grand Prix Ivan Yarygin
Gold medal – first place	2022 Krasnoyarsk	86 kg
Gold medal – first place	2019 Krasnoyarsk	86 kg
Gold medal – first place	2017 Krasnoyarsk	86 kg
Silver medal – second place	2020 Krasnoyarsk	86 kg
Bronze medal – third place	2016 Krasnoyarsk	86 kg
Bronze medal – third place	2015 Krasnoyarsk	86 kg
Bronze medal – third place	2012 Krasnoyarsk	74 kg

Dauren Khalidovich Kurugliev (Russian: Даурен Халидович Куруглиев, Greek: Νταουρέν Κουρουγκλίεφ; born 12 July 1992) is a Russian-born Greek freestyle wrestler, naturalized as a Greek citizen before competing in the 2024 Summer Olympics. He is the 2019 European Games gold medalist, a 3x European champion and a 2024 Olympic bronze medalist.

== Sport career ==
Kurugliev won junior titles including the Russian Junior National Championships in 2011 and the North Caucasian Federal District championships in 2011 and 2013. He competed in the World Cup 2015 in Los Angeles, California and won all three wrestling matches there; he defeated three-time NCAA All-American champion of the Penn State Nittany Lions wrestling Ed Ruth from the United States (by fall), Usukhbaatar Purevee of Mongolia and Aleksandr Gostiev of Azerbaijan. After competing in the American World Cup, he lost in the second round of the 2015 Russian Freestyle Wrestling Championships and so quit his participation there. On 5 July 2015, he lost in the final of the Ali Aliyev Memorial, losing there to Shamil Kudiyamagomedov of Russia.

In 2020, he won the gold medal in the men's 86 kg event at the Individual Wrestling World Cup held in Belgrade, Serbia. Since 2023 he started representing Greece in international level and won two European Championships in 2023 and 2024.

Kurugliev competed at the 2024 European Wrestling Olympic Qualification Tournament in Baku, Azerbaijan hoping to qualify for the 2024 Summer Olympics in Paris, France. He was eliminated in his second match and he did not qualify for the Olympics. A month later, Kurugliev earned a quota place for Greece for the Olympics at the 2024 World Wrestling Olympic Qualification Tournament held in Istanbul, Turkey.

At the 2024 Summer Olympics he won the bronze medal in freestyle wrestling. In the match for the bronze medal he defeated Myles Amine of San Marino.

== Championships and accomplishments ==
- 2011 Russian Junior National Champion
- 2012 Golden Grand-Prix Ivan Yarygin Bronze Medalist – 84 kg
- 2013 Heydar Aliyev Memorial 5th – 84 kg
- 2013 Ramzan Kadyrov & Adlan Varayev Cup Silver Medalist – 84 kg
- 2013 Intercontinental Cup 5th – 84 kg
- 2014 Heydar Aliyev Memorial 10th – 86 kg
- 2014 Golden Grand-Prix Ivan Yarygin 8th – 86 kg
- 2014 Memorial Ali Aliyev 10th – 86 kg
- 2014 Intercontinental Cup Bronze Medalist – 86 kg
- 2014 Russian National Freestyle Wrestling 5th – 86 kg
- 2015 Golden Grand Prix Ivan Yarygin Bronze Medalist - 86 kg
- 2015 Freestyle Wrestling World Cup 4th – 86 kg
- 2015 Russian National Freestyle Wrestling 11th – 86 kg
- 2015 Ali Aliyev Memorial runner-up – 86 kg
- 2015 Ramzan Kadyrov & Adlan Varayev Cup winner – 86 kg
- 2015 Intercontinental Cup winner – 86 kg
- 2016 Golden Grand Prix Ivan Yarygin Bronze Medalist – 86 kg
- 2017 Golden Grand Prix Ivan Yarygin Gold Medalist – 86 kg
- 2017 Yasar Dogu gold medalist – 86 kg
- 2017 European Championships Gold Medalist – 86 kg
- 2019 European Games Gold medalist – 86 kg
- 2023 European Championships Gold Medalist – 86 kg
- 2024 European Championships Gold Medalist – 86 kg
- 2024 Summer Olympics Bronze Medalist — 86 kg
- 2025 European Wrestling Championships Gold Medalist — 86 kg

== Honorary Greek citizenship ==
The exclusion of Russia from all sporting events, as a counter-measure to the country's invasion of Ukraine, deprived many prominent Russian athletes of the opportunity to take part in European competitions. When the United World Wrestling offered Russian athletes the chance to compete with another country, Kurugliev accepted an offer from the Greek Wrestling Federation (EL.O.P.) to compete in Greek colours.

The Greek federation changed his sports citizenship and the wrestler was able to compete and win gold medals at the Men's European Wrestling Championships in Zagreb in April 2023 and in Bucharest in 2024. Following these successes, the EL.O.P. initiated the procedure for him to become a Greek citizen in order to participate in the 2024 Olympic Games. Invoking "Article 13" of the "Greek Citizenship Code", which states that a foreigner may be naturalised as a Greek citizen if he or she has rendered exceptional services to Greece or if his or her naturalisation is in the exceptional interest of the country, the EL.O.P. submitted the relevant application to the Minister of the Interior, Niki Kerameus, on 7 July 2023, asking her to recommend positively to the President of the Republic, that Kurougliev be declared an honorary Greek citizen.

The then Minister did not proceed with the procedure, which resulted in the athlete being unable to qualify for the Olympics through competitions or the world ranking. When the athlete was close to not even qualifying for the pre-Olympic tournament, the federation appealed to the Prime Minister to intervene. The Prime Minister's Office instructed that the procedures should be initiated immediately and that the passport should be issued so that Kurugliev could register for the Olympics. Finally, on 28 February 2024, he took the oath of Greek citizenship before the Secretary General of Citizenship. In the end, he managed to take part in the final qualifying tournament in Istanbul, where he qualified for Paris.
