= 2017 European Wrestling Championships – Men's freestyle 86 kg =

The men's freestyle 86 kg is a competition featured at the 2017 European Wrestling Championships, and was held in Novi Sad, Serbia on May 2.

== Medalists ==
Gold	Dauren Kurugliev; Russia
Silver	Aleksander Gostiyev; Azerbaijan
Bronze	Selim Yaşar; Turkey
Bronze	István Veréb; Hungary

== Results ==
Legend

- F — Won by fall

=== Final ===
Final
Aleksandr Gostiev (AZE)	0
Dauren Kurugliev (RUS)	6

=== Top half ===
==== Section 1 ====
Round of 32

Round of 16
Benjamin Sezgin (GER)	5
Liubomyr Sagaliuk (UKR)	2
Selim Yaşar (TUR)	11
Boban Savev (MKD)	0
Aleksander Gostiyev (AZE)	3
Zbigniew Baranowski (POL)	1
David Radchenko (ISR)	2
Vahe Tamrazyan (ARM)	10

Quarterfinals
Benjamin Sezgin (GER)	0
Selim Yaşar (TUR)	10
Aleksander Gostiyev (AZE)	5
Vahe Tamrazyan (ARM)	3

Semifinals
Selim Yaşar (TUR)	2
Aleksander Gostiyev (AZE)	3

=== Bottom half ===
Round of 32
István Veréb (HUN)	10
Aleksandros Gosta (SRB)	0
Adlan Tasuyeu (BLR)	1
Georgi Sredkov (BUL)	1

Round of 16
Dato Marsagishvili (GEO)	7
Ville Heino (FIN)	1
Stefan Reichmuth (SUI)	0
Denis Balaur (MDA)	10
Boris Makoev (SVK)	0
Dauren Kurugliev (RUS)	4
István Veréb (HUN)	4
Georgi Sredkov (BUL)	2

Quarterfinals
Dato Marsagishvili (GEO)	11
Denis Balaur (MDA)	6
Dauren Kurugliev (RUS)	6
István Veréb (HUN)	2

Semifinals
Dato Marsagishvili (GEO)	2
Dauren Kurugliev (RUS)	4

=== Repechage ===
Repechage round 2
Zbigniew Baranowski (POL)	7
Vahe Tamrazyan (ARM)	2
Boris Makoev (SVK)	5
István Veréb (HUN)	6

Bronze medals
Zbigniew Baranowski (POL)	3
Selim Yaşar (TUR)	4
István Veréb (HUN)	2
Dato Marsagishvili (GEO)	2
