= Alireza Mohmadi =

Iranian Greco-Roman wrestler

Alireza Mohmedi
Personal information
- Native name: علیرضا مهمدی
- Full name: Alireza Azizkhoon Mohmadipiani
- Born: 30 October 2002 (age 24) Izeh, Iran
- Height: 1.86 m (6 ft 1 in)
- Weight: 87 kg (192 lb)

Sport
- Country: Iran
- Sport: Greco-Roman
- Event: 87 kg
Medal record
Men's Greco-Roman wrestling
Representing Iran
Olympic Games
Silver medal – second place	2024 Paris	87 kg
World Championships
Silver medal – second place	2023 Belgrade	82 kg
Silver medal – second place	2025 Zagreb	87 kg
Silver medal – second place	2026 Astana	87 kg
Asian Championships
Silver medal – second place	2023 Astana	82 kg
Dan Kolov & Nikola Petrov Tournament
Bronze medal – third place	2022 Veliko Tarnovo	82 kg
Grand Prix
Gold medal – first place	2023 Bishkek	82 kg
Gold medal – first place	2023 Zagreb	82 kg
Gold medal – first place	2025 Tirana	87 kg
Silver medal – second place	2024 Zagreb	87 kg
World Juniors Championships
Gold medal – first place	2022 Sofia	82 kg
Asian Juniors Championships
Gold medal – first place	2022 Manama	82 kg

Alireza Azizkhoon Mohmadipiani, also known as Alireza Mohmadi (Persian: علیرضا مهمدی; born 30 October 2002), is an Iranian Greco-Roman wrestler competing in the 87 kg division. He won the silver medal in the 87 kg event at the 2024 Summer Olympics in Paris, France.

== Career ==
At the 2023 Asian Championships, Mohmadi defeated his Chinese rival Zhejiang Halishan 7–0 in the quarter-finals of the 82 kg competition and reached the semi-finals. He lost 8–0 to Akilbak Talantbikov of Kyrgyzstan and reached the third place match. Mehdi defeated Rohit Dahia of India 5–1 to win the bronze medal.

Alireza competed in the 2023 World Wrestling Championships event in Belgrade, Serbia and won the silver medal. Alireza Mehdi defeated Serbia's Branko Kovacevic 8–0 in the round of 16 of the men's grappling 82 kg last on and advanced to the quarter-finals. The world bronze medallist defeated Ukraine's Yaroslav Filchakov 4–1 to reach the semi-finals. Mehdi defeated Moldovan Mihail Brado 5–1 and reached the final. World champion and Olympic bronze medallist Refik Huseynov of Azerbaijan was defeated 2–1 and won the silver medal.

He competed at the 2024 Asian Wrestling Olympic Qualification Tournament in Bishkek, Kyrgyzstan and he earned a quota place for Iran for the 2024 Summer Olympics in Paris, France.

== Achievements ==
Year	Tournament	Location	Result	Event
2023	World Championships	Belgrade, Serbia	2nd	Greco-Roman 82 kg
2024	Summer Olympics	Paris, France	2nd	Greco-Roman 87 kg
2025	World Championships	Zagreb, Croatia	2nd	Greco-Roman 87 kg
2026	World Championships	Astana, Kazakhstan	2nd	Greco-Roman 87 kg
