= Muhammet Karavuş =

Turkish freestyle wrestler

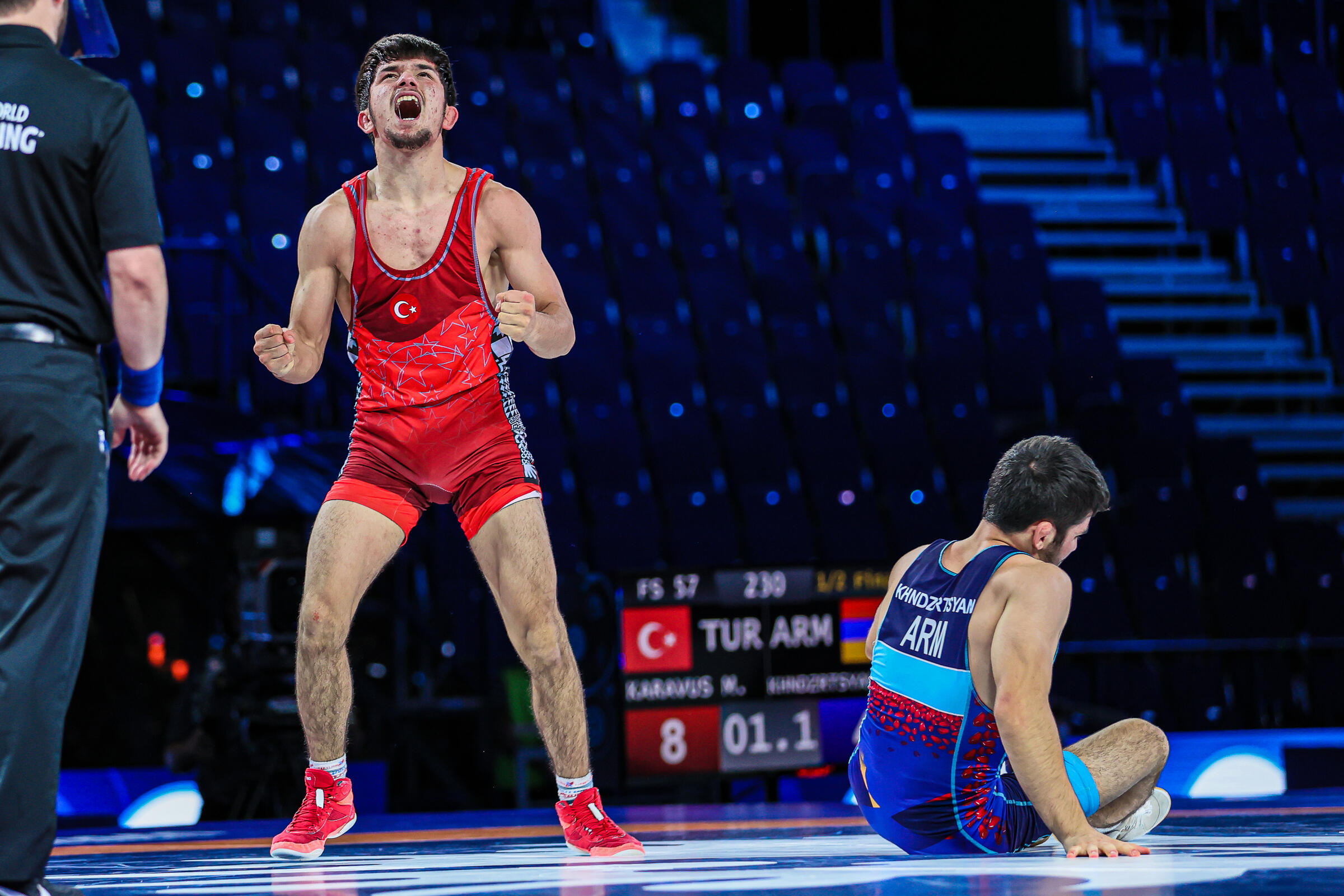
- 2021 World Juniors Championships

Personal information
- Nationality: Turkey
- Born: 10 June 2002 (age 24) Ordu, Turkey
- Education: Kırşehir Ahi Evran University
- Height: 170 cm (5 ft 7 in)

Sport
- Country: Turkey
- Sport: Wrestling
- Weight class: 57 kg
- Event: Freestyle
- Club: Istanbul BB SK

Achievements and titles
- Regional finals: (silver) (2024)
Medal record
Men's freestyle wrestling
Representing Turkey
European Championships
Silver medal – second place	2024 Bucharest	57 kg
Mediterranean Games
Gold medal – first place	2022 Oran	57 kg
Gold medal – first place	2026 Taranto	57 kg
Yasar Dogu Tournament
Gold medal – first place	2026 Antalya	57 kg
Bronze medal – third place	2022 Istanbul	57 kg
Bronze medal – third place	2025 Kocaeli	57 kg
Grand Prix
Bronze medal – third place	2024 Zagreb	57 kg
Bronze medal – third place	2025 Grozny	57 kg
European U23 Championships
Silver medal – second place	2024 Baku	57 kg
World Juniors Championships
Silver medal – second place	2021 Ufa	57 kg
European Cadets Championships
Silver medal – second place	2019 Faenza	55 kg

Muhammet Karavuş (born 10 June 2002) is a Turkish freestyle wrestler competing in the 57 kg division. He is a member of Istanbul BB SK. He won the silver medal in the men's 57 kg event at the 2024 European Wrestling Championships held in Bucharest, Romania.

== Career ==
Muhammet Karavuş won the silver medal in the men's 57 kg event at the 2021 World Junior Wrestling Championships in Russia. Karavuş was a point away from winning the gold but Ramamzan Bagavudinov scripted a win for the ages.

In 2022, he won one of the bronze medals in his event at the Yasar Dogu Tournament held in Istanbul, Turkey. He won the gold medal in the 57 kg event at the 2022 Mediterranean Games held in Oran, Algeria. He competed in the 57 kg event at the 2022 World Wrestling Championships held in Belgrade, Serbia.
