= Islam Bazarganov =

Azerbaijani freestyle wrestler

Personal information
- Native name: Ислам Базарганов
- Born: 1 August 1998 (age 28) Kizilyurt, Dagestan, Russia
- Height: 1.65 m (5 ft 5 in)
- Weight: 57 kg (126 lb; 9.0 st)

Sport
- Country: Azerbaijan
- Sport: Amateur wrestling
- Weight class: 57 kg
- Event: Freestyle
Medal record
Men's freestyle wrestling
Representing Azerbaijan
European Championships
Bronze medal – third place	2024 Bucharest	57 kg
Bronze medal – third place	2025 Bratislava	57 kg
Islamic Solidarity Games
Silver medal – second place	2021 Konya	61 kg
Silver medal – second place	2025 Riyadh	57 kg
European Cadets Championships
Gold medal – first place	2015 Subotica	50 kg

Islam Bazarganov (Russian: Ислам Базарганов; born 1 August 1998) is an Azerbaijani freestyle wrestler who currently competes at 57 kilograms

== Career ==
Bazarganov won one of the bronze medals in the men's 57 kg event at the 2024 European Wrestling Championships held in Bucharest, Romania. He defeated Kamil Kerymov of Ukraine in his bronze medal match.

On April 24, 2026, at the European Championship in Tirana, Islam Bazarganov (57 kg) defeated Aryyaan Tyutrin (UWW) and advanced to the semifinals. On April 25, 2026, in the final he overcame Musa Mekhtikhanov (UWW) with a score of 8:6 and won the gold medal.

== Achievements ==
Year	Tournament	Location	Result	Event
2022	Islamic Solidarity Games	Konya, Turkey	2nd	Freestyle 61 kg
2024	European Championships	Bucharest, Romania	3rd	Freestyle 57 kg
2025	European Championships	Tirana, Albania	1st	Freestyle 57 kg
