= Robert Dingashvili =

Georgian freestyle wrestler

Personal information
- Native name: რობერტ დინგაშვილი
- Born: 23 June 1997 (age 29) Kvareli, Georgia
- Height: 1.72 m (5 ft 8 in)
- Weight: 57 kg (126 lb; 9.0 st)

Sport
- Country: Georgia
- Sport: Amateur wrestling
- Weight class: 57 kg
- Event: Freestyle
Medal record
Men's freestyle wrestling
Representing Georgia
European Championships
Bronze medal – third place	2024 Bucharest	57 kg
Dan Kolov & Nikola Petrov Tournament
Bronze medal – third place	2022 Veliko Tarnovo	57 kg
European U23 Championships
Bronze medal – third place	2019 Novi Sad	57 kg
European Juniors Championships
Silver medal – second place	2016 Bucharest	55 kg
Bronze medal – third place	2015 Istanbul	50 kg

Robert Dingashvili (born 23 June 1997) is a Georgian freestyle wrestler who currently competes at 57 kilograms He won a bronze medal at the 2024 European Wrestling Championships held in Bucharest, Romania.

== Career ==
Dingashvili won one of the bronze medals in the men's 57 kg event at the 2024 European Wrestling Championships held in Bucharest, Romania. He defeated Ilman Mukhtarov of France in his bronze medal match. He competed at the 2024 European Wrestling Olympic Qualification Tournament in Baku, Azerbaijan hoping to qualify for the 2024 Summer Olympics in Paris, France. He was eliminated in his first match and he did not qualify for the Olympics.

== Achievements ==
Year	Tournament	Location	Result	Event
2024	European Championships	Bucharest, Romania	3rd	Freestyle 57 kg
