= Aryan Tsiutryn =

Belarusian freestyle wrestler

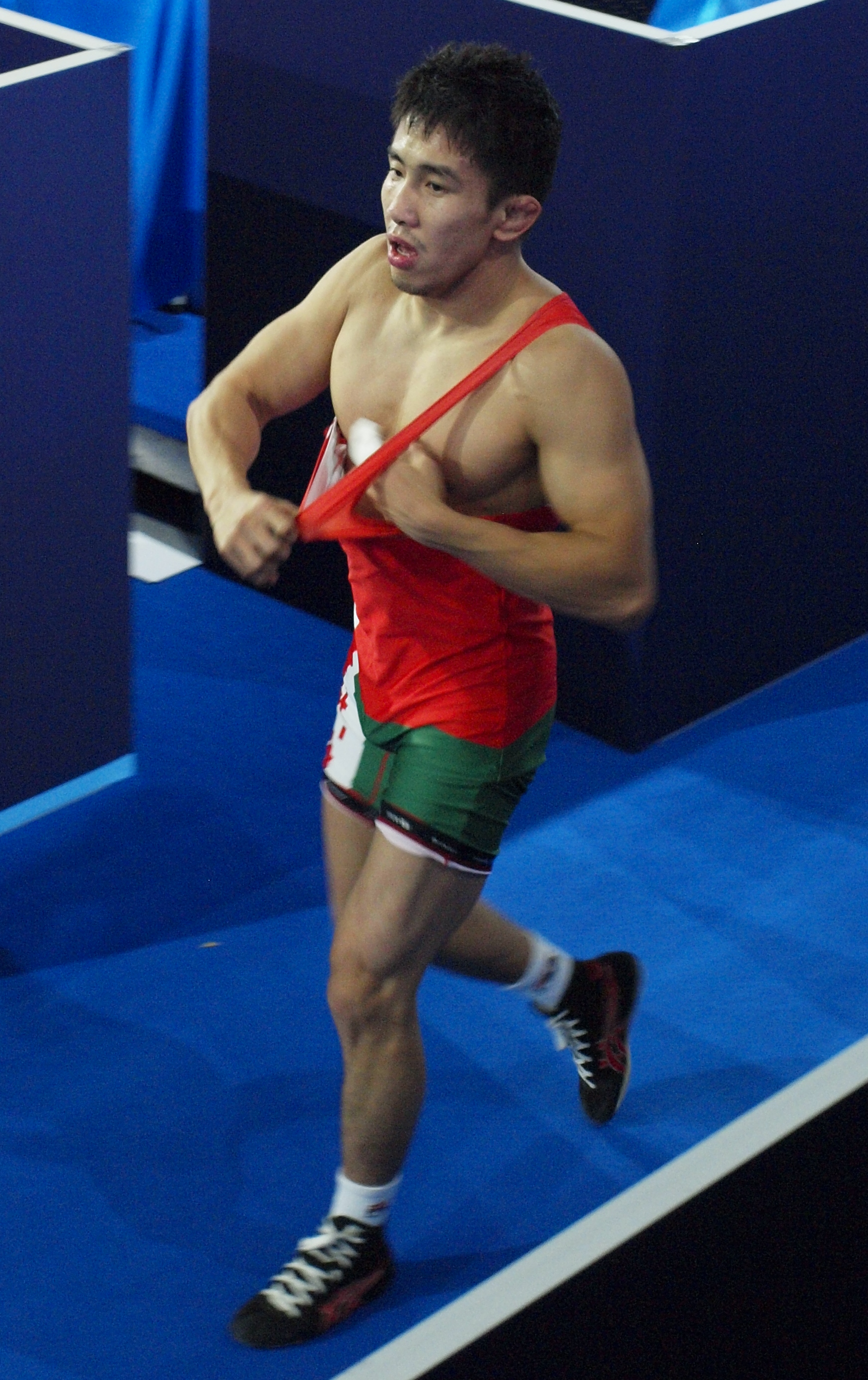
- Aryan Tsiutryn at the 2021 World Wrestling Championships in Oslo, Norway

Personal information
- Native name: Арыйан Иннокентьевич Тютрин
- Full name: Aryian Innokentievich Tyutrin
- Nationality: Russia; Belarus
- Born: 23 November 1994 (age 31) Sakha, Yakutsk
- Height: 162 cm (5 ft 4 in)

Sport
- Country: Russia; Belarus (since 2021)
- Sport: Amateur wrestling
- Weight class: 57 kg
- Event: Freestyle

Achievements and titles
- World finals: (bronze) (2021)
- Regional finals: (bronze) (2025)
Medal record
Men's freestyle wrestling
Representing Belarus
World Championships
Bronze medal – third place	2021 Oslo	57 kg
Golden Grand Prix Ivan Yarygin
Gold medal – first place	2021 Krasnoyarsk	57 kg
Dan Kolov & Nikola Petrov Tournament
Gold medal – first place	2022 Veliko Tarnovo	57 kg
Representing Russia
World Cup
Gold medal – first place	2019 Yakutsk	57 kg
Dan Kolov & Nikola Petrov Tournament
Bronze medal – third place	2019 Russe	61 kg
European Juniors Championships
Bronze medal – third place	2013 Skopje	50 kg
Representing United World Wrestling
European Championships
Bronze medal – third place	2025 Bratislava	57 kg
Representing Individual Neutral Athletes
Grand Prix
Bronze medal – third place	2024 Budapest	57 kg
Representing (Sakha Republic) Sakha
Russian National Championships
Bronze medal – third place	2018 Odintsovo	57 kg
Bronze medal – third place	2016 Yakutsk	57 kg
Bronze medal – third place	2014 Yakutsk	57 kg
Golden Grand Prix Ivan Yarygin
Bronze medal – third place	2020 Krasnoyarsk	57 kg

Aryan Tsiutryn (Russian: Арыйан Иннокентьевич Тютрин; born 23 November 1994) is a Russian and Belarusian freestyle wrestler. He won one of the bronze medals in the men's 57 kg event at the 2021 World Wrestling Championships held in Oslo, Norway.

He competed at the 2024 European Wrestling Olympic Qualification Tournament in Baku, Azerbaijan and he earned a quota place for the Individual Neutral Athletes for the 2024 Summer Olympics in Paris, France, he missed these games, and he was reallocated to Vladimir Egorov.
