= 2020 Individual Wrestling World Cup – Men's freestyle 86 kg =

The men's freestyle 86 kilograms is a competition featured at the 2020 Individual Wrestling World Cup, and was held in Belgrade, Serbia on 17 and 18 December 2020.

== Medalists ==
Gold	Dauren Kurugliev; Russia
Silver	Zbigniew Baranowski; Poland
Bronze	Piotr Ianulov; Moldova
Bronze	Osman Göçen; Turkey

== Results ==
Legend

- F — Won by fall

1/16 finals
	Score	
Bedopassa Buassat (GBS)	0–10	Taimuraz Friev (ESP)

1/8 finals
Dauren Kurugliev (RUS)	8
Akhmed Aibuev (FRA)	0
Boris Makoev (SVK)	1
Piotr Ianulov (MDA)	3
Ivars Samušonoks (LAT)	7
Deepak Punia (IND)	14
Uri Kalashnikov (ISR)	7
Pool Ambrocio (PER)	1
Rasul Tsikhayeu (BLR)	2
Osman Göçen (TUR)	12
Mraz Dzhafarian (UKR)	0
Zbigniew Baranowski (POL)	3
Akhmed Magamaev (BUL)	3
Abubakr Abakarov (AZE)	8^{F}
Hovhannes Mkhitaryan (ARM)	0
Taimuraz Friev (ESP)	10

Quarterfinals
Dauren Kurugliev (RUS)	9
Piotr Ianulov (MDA)	2
Deepak Punia (IND)	8
Uri Kalashnikov (ISR)	0
Osman Göçen (TUR)	4
Zbigniew Baranowski (POL)	4
Abubakr Abakarov (AZE)	0
Taimuraz Friev (ESP)	10

Semifinals
Dauren Kurugliev (RUS)	4
Deepak Punia (IND)	0
Zbigniew Baranowski (POL)	3
Taimuraz Friev (ESP)	2

Final
Dauren Kurugliev (RUS)	5
Zbigniew Baranowski (POL)	1

Repechage round 1
Akhmed Aibuev (FRA)	0
Piotr Ianulov (MDA)	6
Mraz Dzhafarian (UKR)	6
Osman Göçen (TUR)	12

Bronze medals
Piotr Ianulov (MDA)	4
Deepak Punia (IND)	1
Osman Göçen (TUR)	11
Taimuraz Friev (ESP)	8
