= 2021 World Wrestling Championships – Men's freestyle 86 kg =

Wrestling competitions

Men's freestyle 86 kg at the 2021 World Championships
- Venue: Nye Jordal Amfi
- Dates: 2–3 October 2021
- Competitors: 25 from 25 nations

Medalists
gold medal	Hassan Yazdani	Iran
silver medal	David Taylor	United States
bronze medal	Abubakr Abakarov	Azerbaijan
bronze medal	Artur Naifonov	RWF

The men's freestyle 86 kilograms is a competition featured at the 2021 World Wrestling Championships, and was held in Oslo, Norway on 2 and 3 October.

This freestyle wrestling competition consists of a single-elimination tournament, with a repechage used to determine the winner of two bronze medals. The two finalists face off for gold and silver medals. Each wrestler who loses to one of the two finalists moves into the repechage, culminating in a pair of bronze medal matches featuring the semifinal losers each facing the remaining repechage opponent from their half of the bracket.

== Results ==
Legend

- F — Won by fall
- WO — Won by walkover

=== Final ===
Final
David Taylor (USA)	2
Hassan Yazdani (IRI)	6

=== Top half ===
Round of 32
Mukhammed Aliiev (UKR)	11
Rasul Tsikhayeu (BLR)	10
Abubakr Abakarov (AZE)	7
Ahmed Dudarov (GER)	0
Piotr Ianulov (MDA)
Uri Kalashnikov (ISR)	WO

Round of 16
David Taylor (USA)	11
Boris Makoev (SVK)	0
Akhmed Aibuev (FRA)	18
Ivars Samušonoks (LAT)	8
Mukhammed Aliiev (UKR)	2
Abubakr Abakarov (AZE)	13
Uri Kalashnikov (ISR)	0
Sandro Aminashvili (GEO)	4

Quarterfinals
David Taylor (USA)	8^{F}
Akhmed Aibuev (FRA)	0
Abubakr Abakarov (AZE)	10
Sandro Aminashvili (GEO)	2

Semifinals
David Taylor (USA)	6^{F}
Abubakr Abakarov (AZE)	2

=== Bottom half ===
Round of 32
Ganbaataryn Gankhuyag (MGL)	4
Hayato Ishiguro (JPN)	7
Mark Inguyesi (KEN)	0
Noel Torres (MEX)	10
Osman Göçen (TUR)	5
Taimuraz Friev (ESP)	10
Kim Gwan-uk (KOR)	5
Sandeep Singh Mann (IND)	4
Dzhemal Ali (BUL)	2
Ethan Ramos (PUR)	14
Azamat Dauletbekov (KAZ)	12
Sebastian Jezierzański (POL)	1

Round of 16
Artur Naifonov (RWF)	11
Hayato Ishiguro (JPN)	0
Noel Torres (MEX)	2
Taimuraz Friev (ESP)	12
Kim Gwan-uk (KOR)	2
Ethan Ramos (PUR)	13
Azamat Dauletbekov (KAZ)	2
Hassan Yazdani (IRI)	12

Quarterfinals
Artur Naifonov (RWF)	5
Taimuraz Friev (ESP)	2
Ethan Ramos (PUR)	0
Hassan Yazdani (IRI)	10

Semifinals
Artur Naifonov (RWF)	2
Hassan Yazdani (IRI)	8

=== Repechage ===
Repechage round 2
Boris Makoev (SVK)	6
Akhmed Aibuev (FRA)	3
Azamat Dauletbekov (KAZ)	10
Ethan Ramos (PUR)	0

Bronze medals
Boris Makoev (SVK)	5
Abubakr Abakarov (AZE)	9
Azamat Dauletbekov (KAZ)	0
Artur Naifonov (RWF)	3

== Final standing ==
Rank	Athlete
1st place, gold medalist(s)	Hassan Yazdani (IRI)
2nd place, silver medalist(s)	David Taylor (USA)
3rd place, bronze medalist(s)	Abubakr Abakarov (AZE)
3rd place, bronze medalist(s)	Artur Naifonov (RWF)
5	Boris Makoev (SVK)
5	Azamat Dauletbekov (KAZ)
7	Ethan Ramos (PUR)
8	Taimuraz Friev (ESP)
9	Akhmed Aibuev (FRA)
10	Noel Torres (MEX)
11	Uri Kalashnikov (ISR)
12	Mukhammed Aliiev (UKR)
13	Kim Gwan-uk (KOR)
14	Sandro Aminashvili (GEO)
15	Hayato Ishiguro (JPN)
16	Rasul Tsikhayeu (BLR)
17	Ivars Samušonoks (LAT)
18	Osman Göçen (TUR)
19	Sandeep Singh Mann (IND)
20	Ganbaataryn Gankhuyag (MGL)
21	Dzhemal Ali (BUL)
22	Sebastian Jezierzański (POL)
23	Piotr Ianulov (MDA)
24	Ahmed Dudarov (GER)
25	Mark Inguyesi (KEN)
