= 2024 European Wrestling Championships – Men's freestyle 86 kg =

Wrestling competition

Men's freestyle 86 kg at the 2024 European Wrestling Championships
- Venue: Polyvalent Hall
- Location: Bucharest, Romania
- Dates: 17-18 February
- Competitors: 27

Medalists
gold medal	Dauren Kurugliev	Greece
silver medal	Myles Amine	San Marino
bronze medal	Osman Göçen	Turkey
bronze medal	Arsenii Dzhioev	Azerbaijan

The men's freestyle 86 kg is a competition featured at the 2024 European Wrestling Championships, and was held in Bucharest, Romania on February 17 and 18.

== Results ==
Legend

- F — Won by fall

=== Final ===
Final
Myles Amine (SMR)	1
Dauren Kurugliev (GRE)	2

=== Top half ===
Round of 32
Samuel Scherrer (SUI)	2
Taimuraz Friev (ESP)	4
Sebastian Jezierzański (POL)	4
Miko Elkala (FIN)	0
Csaba Vida (HUN)	1
Vasyl Mykhailov (UKR)	11
Vladimeri Gamkrelidze (GEO)	2
Magomed Ramazanov (BUL)	8^{F}
Domantas Pauliuščenko (LTU)	7
Aimar Andruse (EST)	5

Round of 16
Myles Amine (SMR)	6
Taimuraz Friev (ESP)	5
Sebastian Jezierzański (POL)	4
Vasyl Mykhailov (UKR)	5
Ahmad Magomedov (MKD)	2
Magomed Ramazanov (BUL)	6
Domantas Pauliuščenko (LTU)	5
Osman Göçen (TUR)	10

Quarterfinals
Myles Amine (SMR)	9
Vasyl Mykhailov (UKR)	2
Magomed Ramazanov (BUL)	6
Osman Göçen (TUR)	12

Semifinals
Myles Amine (SMR)	8
Osman Göçen (TUR)	8

=== Bottom half ===
Round of 32
Mushegh Mkrtchyan (ARM)	4
Alans Amirovs (LAT)	7^{F}
Arslan Bagaev (AIN)	0
Dauren Kurugliev (GRE)	10
Achsarbek Gulajev (SVK)	1
Lars Schäfle (GER)	1
Aron Caneva (ITA)	3^{F}
Arkadzi Pahasian (AIN)	9
Ivan Ichizli (MDA)	10
Mădălin Mînzală (ROU)	0
Arsenii Dzhioev (AZE)	11
Matt Finesilver (ISR)	1

Round of 16
Benjamin Greil (AUT)	8
Alans Amirovs (LAT)	9
Dauren Kurugliev (GRE)	11
Achsarbek Gulajev (SVK)	0
Aron Caneva (ITA)	0
Ivan Ichizli (MDA)	8^{F}
Arsenii Dzhioev (AZE)	6
Rakhim Magamadov (FRA)	2

Quarterfinals
Alans Amirovs (LAT)	0
Dauren Kurugliev (GRE)	10
Ivan Ichizli (MDA)	9
Arsenii Dzhioev (AZE)	11

Semifinals
Dauren Kurugliev (GRE)	2
Arsenii Dzhioev (AZE)	1

=== Repechage ===
Repechage round 1
Arslan Bagaev (AIN)	9
Achsarbek Gulajev (SVK)	0

Repechage round 2
Taimuraz Friev (ESP)	2
Vasyl Mykhailov (UKR)	8
Arslan Bagaev (AIN)	5
Alans Amirovs (LAT)	0

Bronze medal match
Vasyl Mykhailov (UKR)	0
Osman Göçen (TUR)	8
Arslan Bagaev (AIN)	4
Arsenii Dzhioev (AZE)	6

== Final standing ==
Rank	Athlete
1st place, gold medalist(s)	Dauren Kurugliev (GRE)
2nd place, silver medalist(s)	Myles Amine (SMR)
3rd place, bronze medalist(s)	Osman Göçen (TUR)
3rd place, bronze medalist(s)	Arsenii Dzhioev (AZE)
5	Vasyl Mykhailov (UKR)
5	Arslan Bagaev (AIN)
7	Ivan Ichizli (MDA)
8	Magomed Ramazanov (BUL)
9	Alans Amirovs (LAT)
10	Aron Caneva (ITA)
11	Taimuraz Friev (ESP)
12	Domantas Pauliuščenko (LTU)
13	Sebastian Jezierzański (POL)
14	Achsarbek Gulajev (SVK)
15	Benjamin Greil (AUT)
16	Aimar Andruse (EST)
17	Samuel Scherrer (SUI)
18	Rakhim Magamadov (FRA)
19	Ahmad Magomedov (MKD)
20	Lars Schäfle (GER)
21	Csaba Vida (HUN)
22	Matt Finesilver (ISR)
23	Arkadzi Pahasian (AIN)
24	Mushegh Mkrtchyan (ARM)
25	Vladimeri Gamkrelidze (GEO)
26	Miko Elkala (FIN)
27	Mădălin Mînzală (ROU)
