= 2025 European Wrestling Championships – Men's freestyle 86 kg =

Wrestling competition

Men's freestyle 86 kg at the 2025 European Wrestling Championships
- Venue: X-Bionic Sphere
- Location: Bratislava, Slovakia
- Dates: 8-9 April
- Competitors: 18

Medalists
gold medal	Magomed Ramazanov	Bulgaria
silver medal	Mahamedkhabib Kadzimahamedau
bronze medal	Osman Göçen	Turkey
bronze medal	Artur Naifonov

The men's freestyle 86 kg is a competition featured at the 2025 European Wrestling Championships, and was held in Bratislava, Slovakia on April 8 and 9.

== Results ==
Legend

- F — Won by fall

=== Final ===
Final
Magomed Ramazanov (BUL)	9
Mahamedkhabib Kadzimahamedau (UWW)	5

=== Top half ===
Round of 32
Dejan Mitrov (MKD)	0
Matt Finesilver (ISR)	6

Round of 16
Magomed Ramazanov (BUL)	5
Osman Göçen (TUR)	0
Matt Finesilver (ISR)	8
Mukhammed Aliiev (UKR)	8
Joshua Morodion (GER)	9
Lukas Lins (AUT)	2
Kornelijus Stulginskas (LTU)	0
Sebastian Jezierzański (POL)	11

Quarterfinals
Magomed Ramazanov (BUL)	10
Matt Finesilver (ISR)	0
Joshua Morodion (GER)	2
Sebastian Jezierzański (POL)	4

Semifinals
Magomed Ramazanov (BUL)	9^{F}
Sebastian Jezierzański (POL)	0

=== Bottom half ===
Round of 32
Theodoros Singiridis (GRE)	2
Mahamedkhabib Kadzimahamedau (UWW)	13

Round of 16
Arsenii Dzhioev (AZE)	1
Artur Naifonov (UWW)	2
Miko Elkala (FIN)	0
Rakhim Magamadov (FRA)	11
Eugeniu Mihalcean (MDA)	4
Mahamedkhabib Kadzimahamedau (UWW)	14
Taimuraz Friev (ESP)	8
Tariel Gaphrindashvili (GEO)	7

Quarterfinals
Artur Naifonov (UWW)	5
Rakhim Magamadov (FRA)	0
Mahamedkhabib Kadzimahamedau (UWW)	5
Taimuraz Friev (ESP)	0

Semifinals
Artur Naifonov (UWW)	3
Mahamedkhabib Kadzimahamedau (UWW)	6

=== Repechage ===
Repechage round 1
Theodoros Singiridis (GRE)	0
Eugeniu Mihalcean (MDA)	4^{F}

Repechage round 2
Matt Finesilver (ISR)	0
Osman Göçen (TUR)	11
Eugeniu Mihalcean (MDA)	8
Taimuraz Friev (ESP)	3

Bronze medal match
Osman Göçen (TUR)	4
Sebastian Jezierzański (POL)	2
Eugeniu Mihalcean (MDA)	0
Artur Naifonov (UWW)	10

== Final standing ==
Rank	Athlete
1st place, gold medalist(s)	Magomed Ramazanov (BUL)
2nd place, silver medalist(s)	Mahamedkhabib Kadzimahamedau (UWW)
3rd place, bronze medalist(s)	Osman Göçen (TUR)
3rd place, bronze medalist(s)	Artur Naifonov (UWW)
5	Sebastian Jezierzański (POL)
5	Eugeniu Mihalcean (MDA)
7	Matt Finesilver (ISR)
8	Rakhim Magamadov (FRA)
9	Joshua Morodion (GER)
10	Taimuraz Friev (ESP)
11	Mukhammed Aliiev (UKR)
12	Tariel Gaphrindashvili (GEO)
13	Lukas Lins (AUT)
14	Theodoros Singiridis (GRE)
15	Arsenii Dzhioev (AZE)
16	Dejan Mitrov (MKD)
17	Kornelijus Stulginskas (LTU)
18	Miko Elkala (FIN)
