= Wrestling at the 2021 Islamic Solidarity Games =

- Host city: Turkey, Konya
- Dates: 10–13 August
- Stadium: Konya Technical University Sports Hall

Wrestling at the 2021 Islamic Solidarity Games were held in Konya, Turkey from 10 to 13 August 2022. Each National Olympic Committee (NOC) has the right to participate with a maximum of one wrestler per weight category in all styles (Greco-Roman, women and freestyle).

The Games were originally scheduled to take place from 20 to 29 August 2021. In May 2020, the Islamic Solidarity Sports Federation (ISSF), who are responsible for the direction and control of the Islamic Solidarity Games, postponed the games as the 2020 Summer Olympics were postponed to July and August 2021, due to the global COVID-19 pandemic.

== Competition schedule ==
All times are (UTC+3)

Date	Time	Event
10 August	11.30-17.00	Elimination rounds, semi-finals and repechage FS – 57-65-74-86-97 kg WW – 50-59 kg
10 August	17.30-20.30	Finals FS – 57-65-74-86-97, WW – 50-59 kg
11 August	11.30-17.00	Elimination rounds and repechage FS – 61-70-79-92-125 kg WW – 53-62-72 kg
11 August	17.30-20.30	Finals FS – 61-70-79-92-125 kg WW – 53-62-72 kg
12 August	11.30-17.00	Elimination rounds and repechage GR – 55-63-72-82-97 kg WW – 55-65-76 kg
12 August	17.30-20.30	Finals GR – 55-63-72-82-97 kg WW – 55-65-76 kg
13 August	11.30-17.00	Elimination rounds and repechage GR – 60-67-77-87-130 kg WW – 57-68 kg
13 August	17.30-20.30	Finals GR – 60-67-77-87-130 kg WW – 57-68 kg

== Medal table ==
Rank	Nation	Gold	Silver	Bronze	Total
1	Azerbaijan (AZE)	8	8	7	23
2	Iran (IRI)	8	3	5	16
3	Kyrgyzstan (KGZ)	6	5	3	14
4	Uzbekistan (UZB)	4	4	10	18
5	Turkey (TUR)	2	5	12	19
6	Kazakhstan (KAZ)	1	1	7	9
7	Nigeria (NGR)	1	1	0	2
8	Albania (ALB)	0	1	0	1
8	Guinea (GUI)	0	1	0	1
8	Ivory Coast (CIV)	0	1	0	1
11	Tajikistan (TJK)	0	0	2	2
11	Tunisia (TUN)	0	0	2	2
13	Guinea-Bissau (GBS)	0	0	1	1
13	Turkmenistan (TKM)	0	0	1	1
Totals (14 entries)		30	30	50	110

== Medalists ==
=== Men's freestyle ===
Event	Gold	Silver	Bronze
57 kg	Gulomjon Abdullaev; Uzbekistan	Almaz Smanbekov; Kyrgyzstan	Rakhat Kalzhan; Kazakhstan
57 kg	Gulomjon Abdullaev; Uzbekistan	Almaz Smanbekov; Kyrgyzstan	Aliabbas Rzazade; Azerbaijan
61 kg	Jahongirmirza Turobov; Uzbekistan	Islam Bazarganov; Azerbaijan	Recep Topal; Turkey
61 kg	Jahongirmirza Turobov; Uzbekistan	Islam Bazarganov; Azerbaijan	Majid Dastan; Iran
65 kg	Haji Aliyev; Azerbaijan	Zelimkhan Abakarov; Albania	Morteza Ghiasi; Iran
65 kg	Haji Aliyev; Azerbaijan	Zelimkhan Abakarov; Albania	Adlan Askarov; Kazakhstan
70 kg	Ernazar Akmataliev; Kyrgyzstan	Hossein Abouzari; Iran	Asgar Mammadaliyev; Azerbaijan
70 kg	Ernazar Akmataliev; Kyrgyzstan	Hossein Abouzari; Iran	Bacar Ndum; Guinea-Bissau
74 kg	Turan Bayramov; Azerbaijan	Mohammad Sadegh Firouzpour; Iran	Ikhtiyor Navruzov; Uzbekistan
74 kg	Turan Bayramov; Azerbaijan	Mohammad Sadegh Firouzpour; Iran	Fazlı Eryılmaz; Turkey
79 kg	Ali Savadkouhi; Iran	Muhammet Akdeniz; Turkey	Bekzod Abdurakhmonov; Uzbekistan
79 kg	Ali Savadkouhi; Iran	Muhammet Akdeniz; Turkey	Gadzhimurad Omarov; Azerbaijan
86 kg	Alireza Karimi; Iran	Abubakr Abakarov; Azerbaijan	Osman Göçen; Turkey
86 kg	Alireza Karimi; Iran	Abubakr Abakarov; Azerbaijan	Nurtilek Karypbaev; Kyrgyzstan
92 kg	Ahmad Bazri; Iran	Erhan Yaylacı; Turkey	Bobur Islomov; Uzbekistan
92 kg	Ahmad Bazri; Iran	Erhan Yaylacı; Turkey	Osman Nurmagomedov; Azerbaijan
97 kg	Mojtaba Goleij; Iran	Mustafa Sessiz; Turkey	Magomed Ibragimov; Uzbekistan
97 kg	Mojtaba Goleij; Iran	Mustafa Sessiz; Turkey	Mamed Ibragimov; Kazakhstan
125 kg	Mehdi Hashemi; Iran	Salim Ercan; Turkey	Khasanboy Rakhimov; Uzbekistan

=== Men's Greco-Roman ===
Event	Gold	Silver	Bronze
55 kg	Eldaniz Azizli; Azerbaijan	Jasurbek Ortikboev; Uzbekistan	Aslamjon Azizov; Tajikistan
55 kg	Eldaniz Azizli; Azerbaijan	Jasurbek Ortikboev; Uzbekistan	Amangali Bekbolatov; Kazakhstan
60 kg	Zholaman Sharshenbekov; Kyrgyzstan	Murad Mammadov; Azerbaijan	Ayhan Karakuş; Turkey
60 kg	Zholaman Sharshenbekov; Kyrgyzstan	Murad Mammadov; Azerbaijan	Mukhammadkodir Yusupov; Uzbekistan
63 kg	Shirzad Beheshti; Iran	Tynar Sharshenbekov; Kyrgyzstan	Firuz Mirzoradzhabov; Tajikistan
63 kg	Shirzad Beheshti; Iran	Tynar Sharshenbekov; Kyrgyzstan	Azatjan Açilow; Turkmenistan
67 kg	Hasrat Jafarov; Azerbaijan	Amantur Ismailov; Kyrgyzstan	Abror Atabaev; Uzbekistan
67 kg	Hasrat Jafarov; Azerbaijan	Amantur Ismailov; Kyrgyzstan	Mohammad Javad Rezaei; Iran
72 kg	Mohammad Reza Rostami; Iran	Ulvu Ganizade; Azerbaijan	Mirzobek Rakhmatov; Uzbekistan
72 kg	Mohammad Reza Rostami; Iran	Ulvu Ganizade; Azerbaijan	Murat Dağ; Turkey
77 kg	Akzhol Makhmudov; Kyrgyzstan	Sanan Suleymanov; Azerbaijan	Furkan Bayrak; Turkey
77 kg	Akzhol Makhmudov; Kyrgyzstan	Sanan Suleymanov; Azerbaijan	Amin Kavianinejad; Iran
82 kg	Rafig Huseynov; Azerbaijan	Kalidin Asykeev; Kyrgyzstan	Mukhammadkodir Rasulov; Uzbekistan
82 kg	Rafig Huseynov; Azerbaijan	Kalidin Asykeev; Kyrgyzstan	Emrah Kuş; Turkey
87 kg	Jalgasbay Berdimuratov; Uzbekistan	Ramin Taheri; Iran	Atabek Azisbek; Kyrgyzstan
97 kg	Rustam Assakalov; Uzbekistan	Uzur Dzhuzupbekov; Kyrgyzstan	Mehdi Bali; Iran
97 kg	Rustam Assakalov; Uzbekistan	Uzur Dzhuzupbekov; Kyrgyzstan	Beytullah Kayışdağ; Turkey
130 kg	Ali Akbar Yousefi; Iran	Osman Yıldırım; Turkey	Sabah Shariati; Azerbaijan

=== Women's freestyle ===
Event	Gold	Silver	Bronze
50 kg	Mariya Stadnik; Azerbaijan	Jasmina Immaeva; Uzbekistan	Sarra Hamdi; Tunisia
53 kg	Leyla Gurbanova; Azerbaijan	Aktenge Keunimjaeva; Uzbekistan	Rahime Arı; Turkey
53 kg	Leyla Gurbanova; Azerbaijan	Aktenge Keunimjaeva; Uzbekistan	Ellada Makhyaddinova; Kazakhstan
55 kg	Zeynep Yetgil; Turkey	Shokhida Akhmedova; Uzbekistan	Elnura Mammadova; Azerbaijan
57 kg	Zhala Aliyeva; Azerbaijan	Esther Kolawole; Nigeria	Elvira Kamaloğlu; Turkey
59 kg	Odunayo Adekuoroye; Nigeria	Alyona Kolesnik; Azerbaijan	Dilfuza Aimbetova; Uzbekistan
62 kg	Aisuluu Tynybekova; Kyrgyzstan	Fatoumata Camara; Guinea	Tetiana Omelchenko; Azerbaijan
62 kg	Aisuluu Tynybekova; Kyrgyzstan	Fatoumata Camara; Guinea	Irina Kuznetsova; Kazakhstan
65 kg	Yelena Shalygina; Kazakhstan	Elis Manolova; Azerbaijan	Dilnaz Sazanova; Kyrgyzstan
68 kg	Meerim Zhumanazarova; Kyrgyzstan	Madina Bakbergenova; Kazakhstan	Aslı Demir; Turkey
72 kg	Buse Tosun; Turkey	Gozal Zutova; Azerbaijan	Nour Jeljeli; Tunisia
72 kg	Buse Tosun; Turkey	Gozal Zutova; Azerbaijan	Zhamila Bakbergenova; Kazakhstan
76 kg	Aiperi Medet Kyzy; Kyrgyzstan	Amy Youin; Ivory Coast	Mehtap Gültekin; Turkey

== Participating nations ==
A total of 253 athletes from 31 nations competed in wrestling at the 2021 Islamic Solidarity Games:

- Afghanistan (4)
- Albania (2)
- Algeria (8)
- Azerbaijan (28)
- Bahrain (1)
- Bangladesh (3)
- Cameroon (3)
- Chad (3)
- Guinea (1)
- Guinea-Bissau (1)
- Indonesia (3)
- Iran (20)
- Ivory Coast (1)
- Jordan (2)
- Kazakhstan (19)
- Kyrgyzstan (25)
- Morocco (6)
- Nigeria (2)
- Pakistan (5)
- Palestine (2)
- Qatar (3)
- Saudi Arabia (6)
- Senegal (5)
- Sudan (2)
- Tajikistan (12)
- Tunisia (6)
- Turkey (30)
- Turkmenistan (15)
- Uganda (2)
- Uzbekistan (30)
- Yemen (3)

== Gallery ==
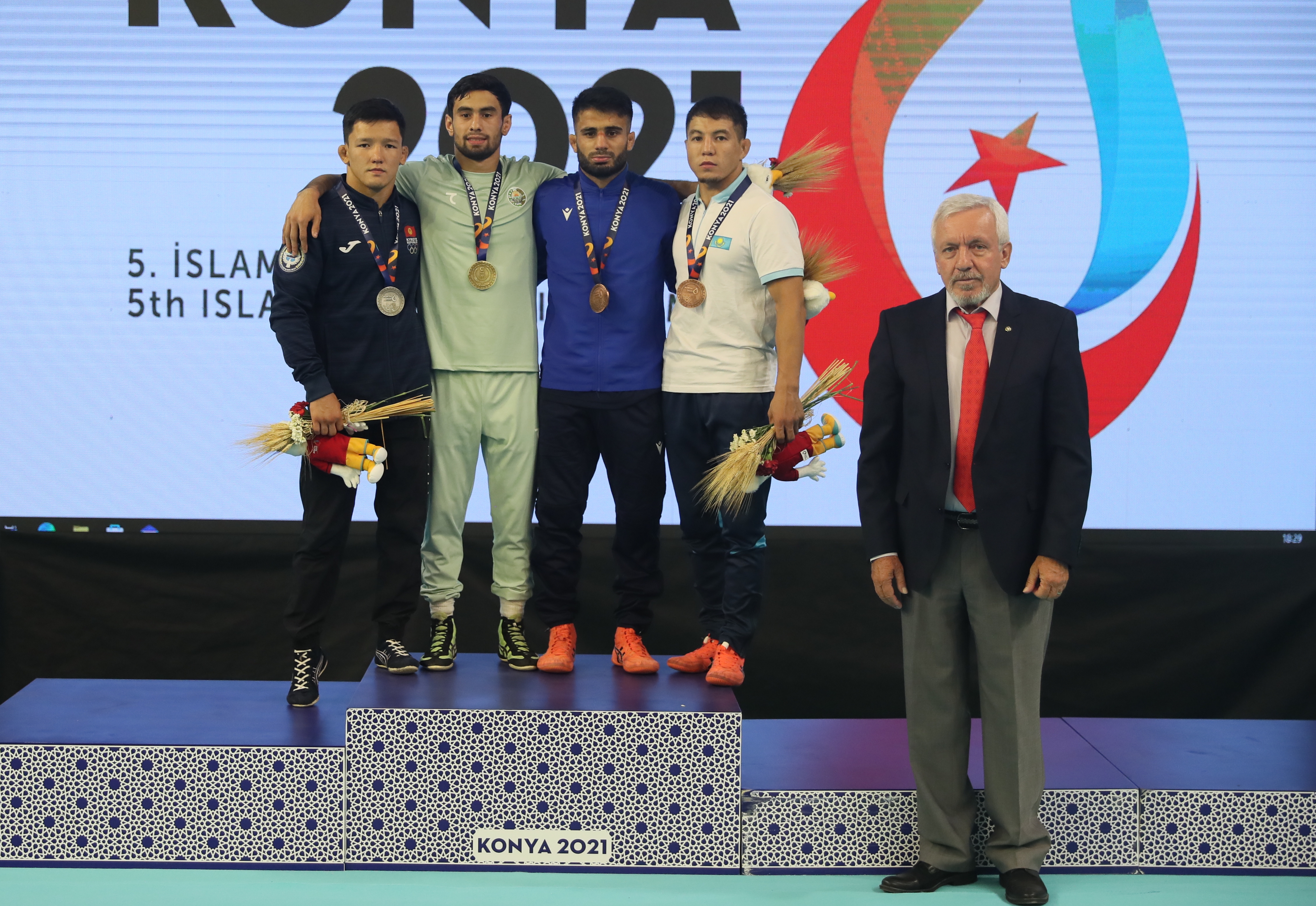
57 kg Medal Ceremony

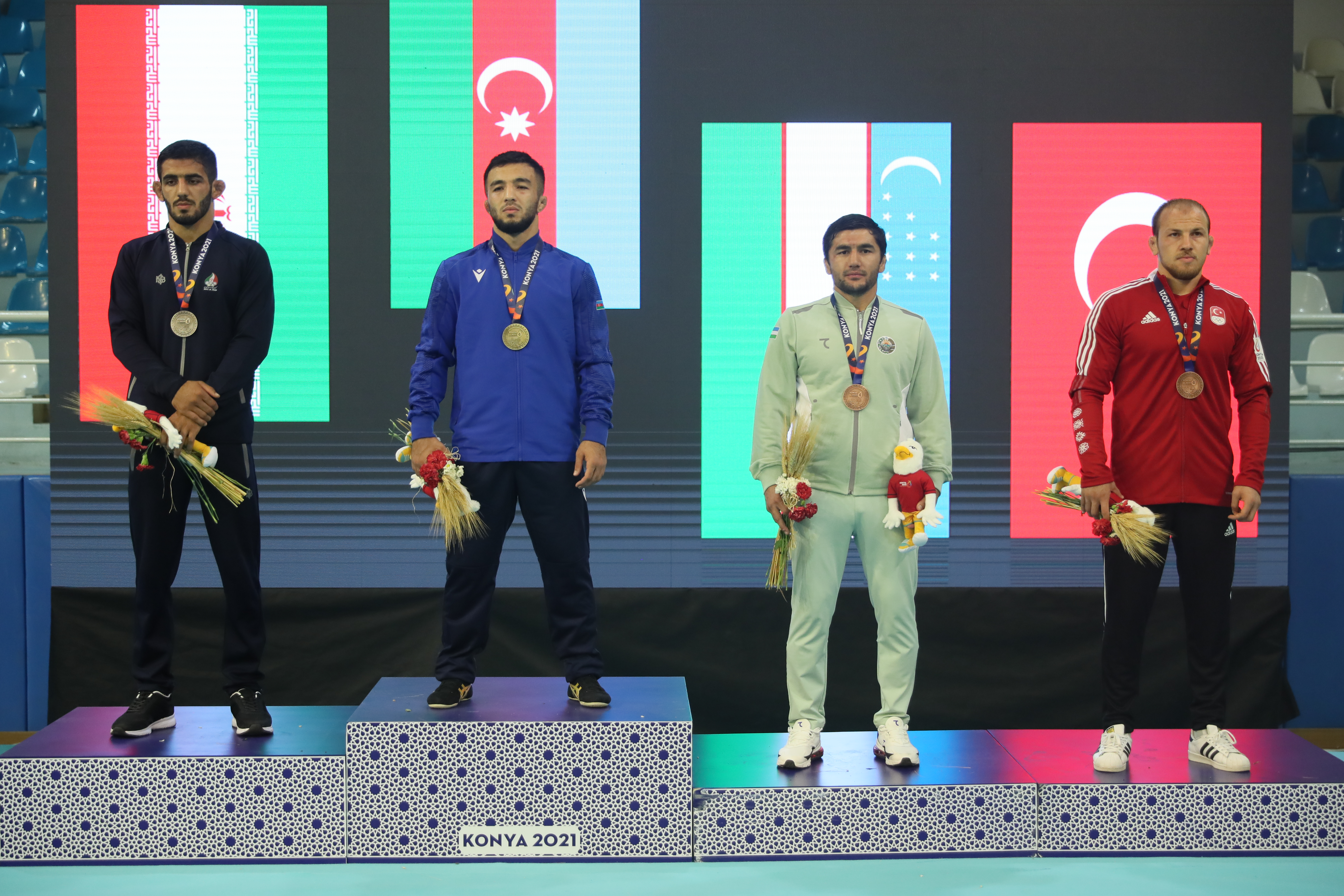
74 kg Medal Ceremony

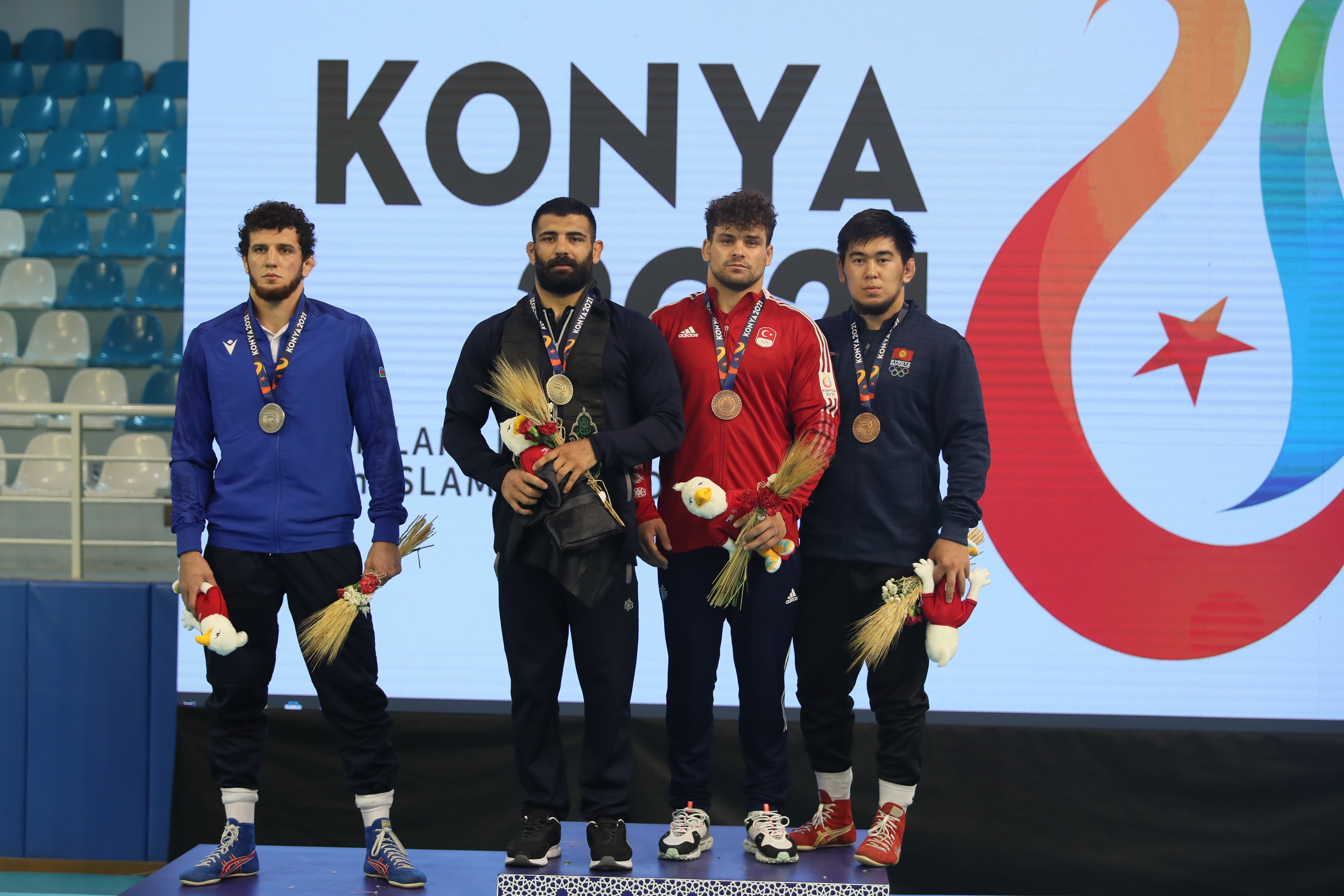
86 kg Medal Ceremony

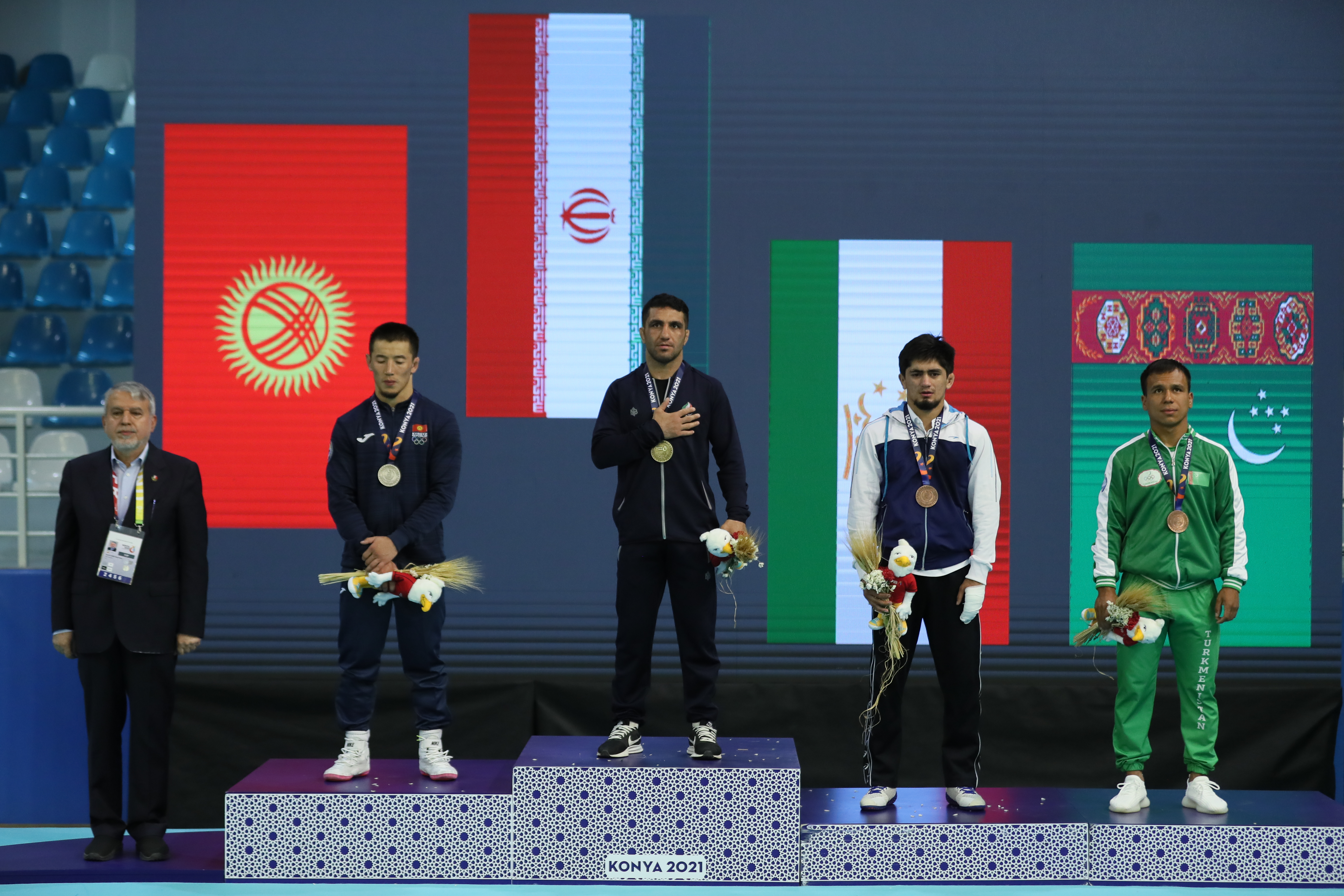
63 kg Medal Ceremony

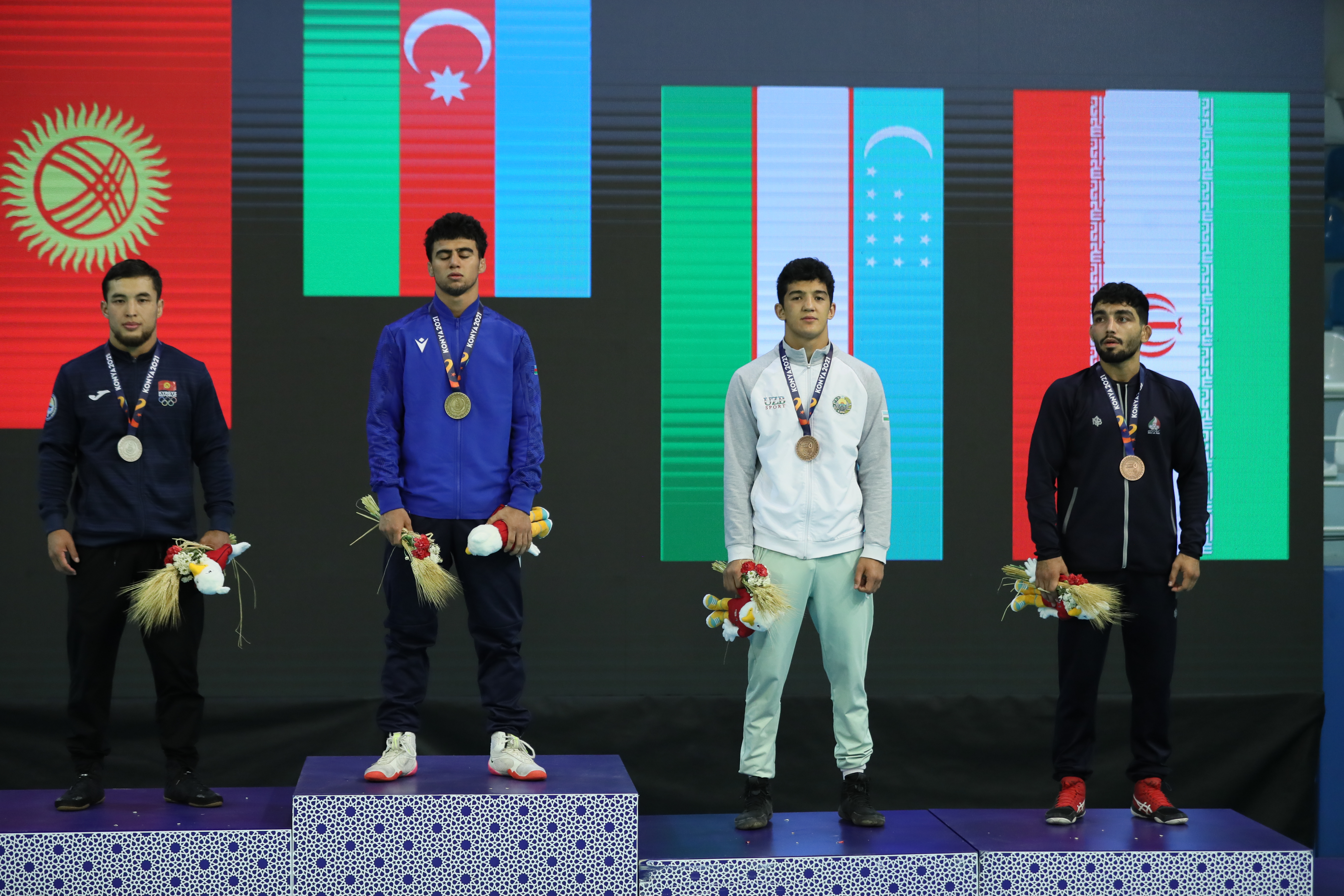
67 kg Medal ceremony

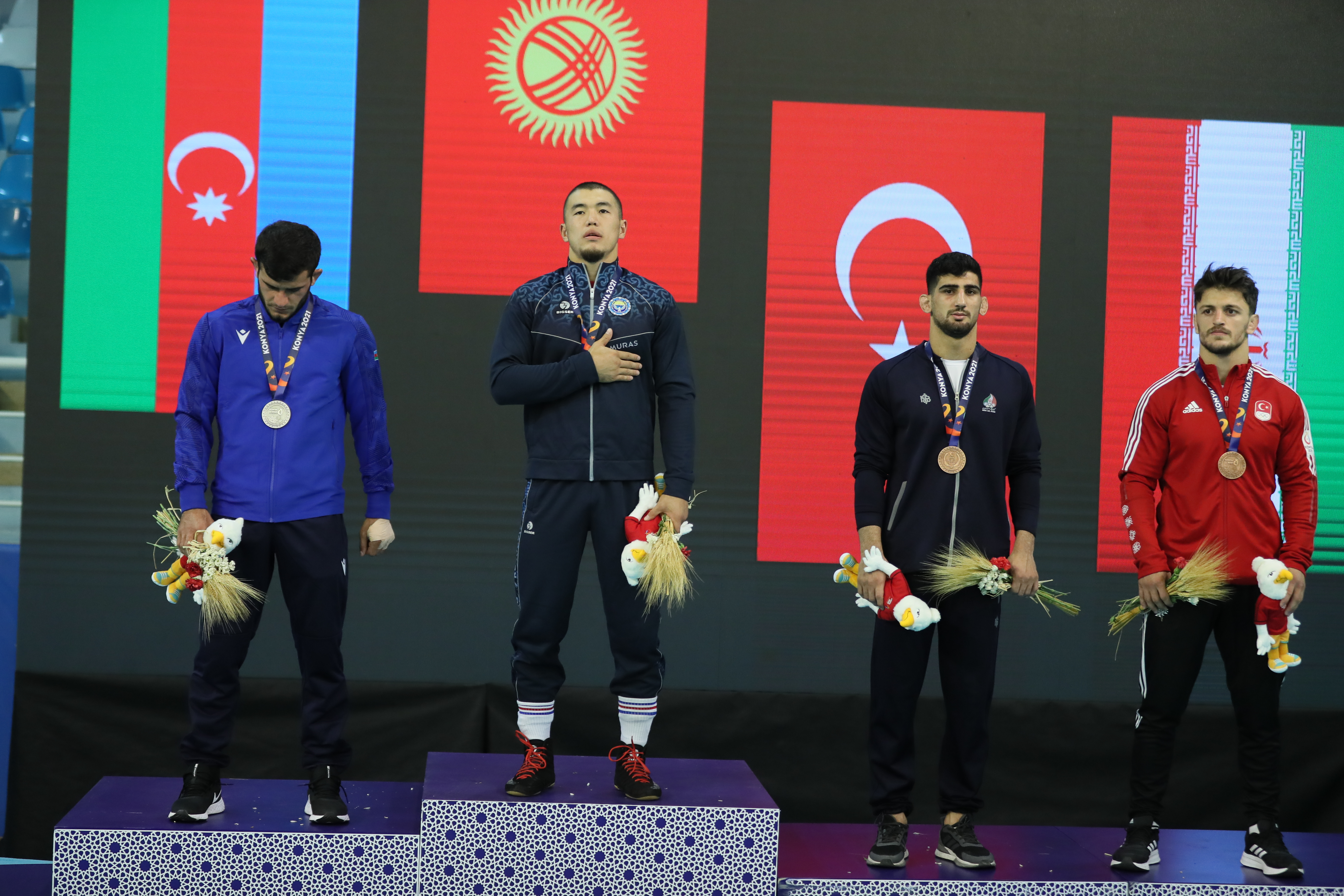
77 kg Medal ceremony

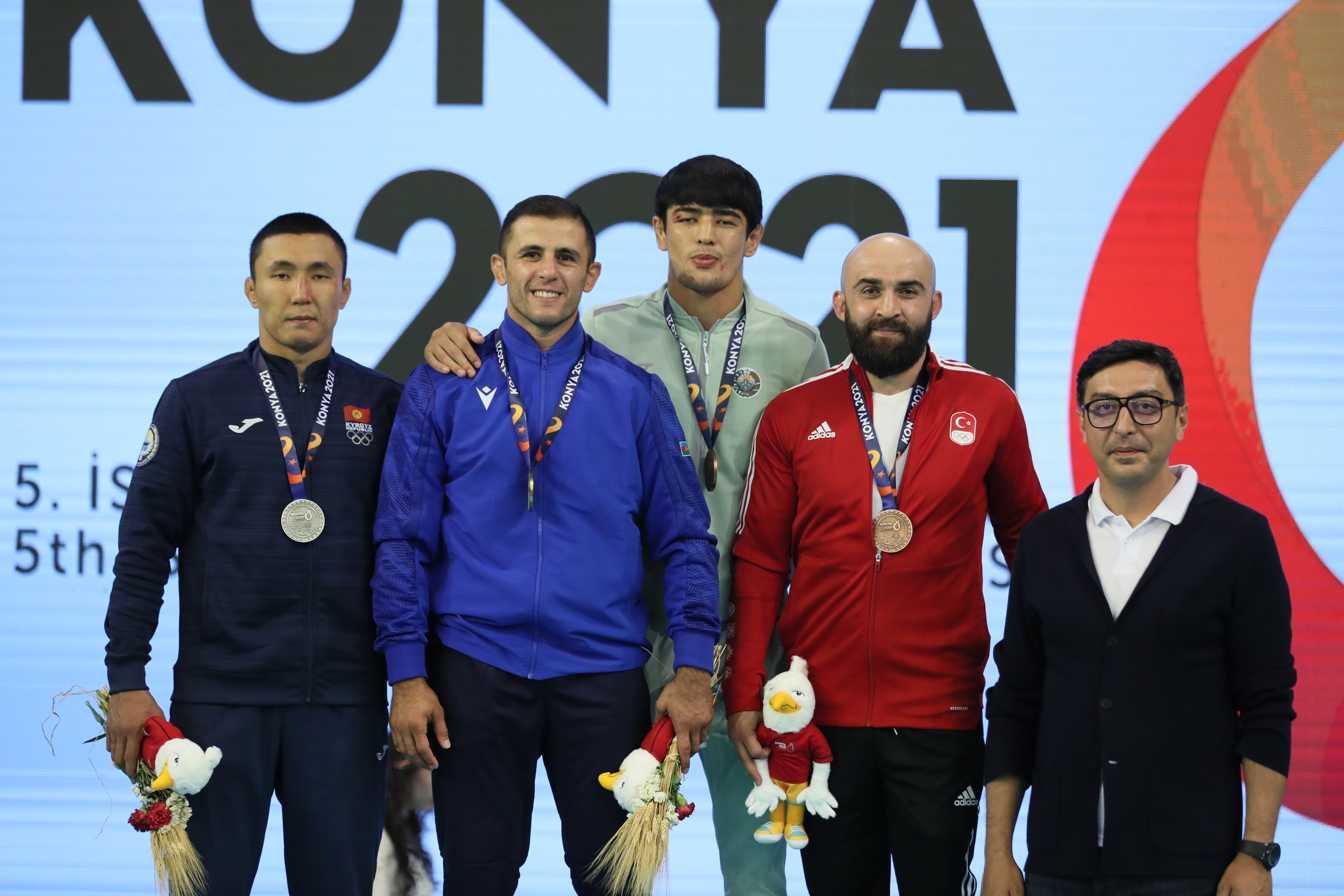
82 kg Medal Ceremony

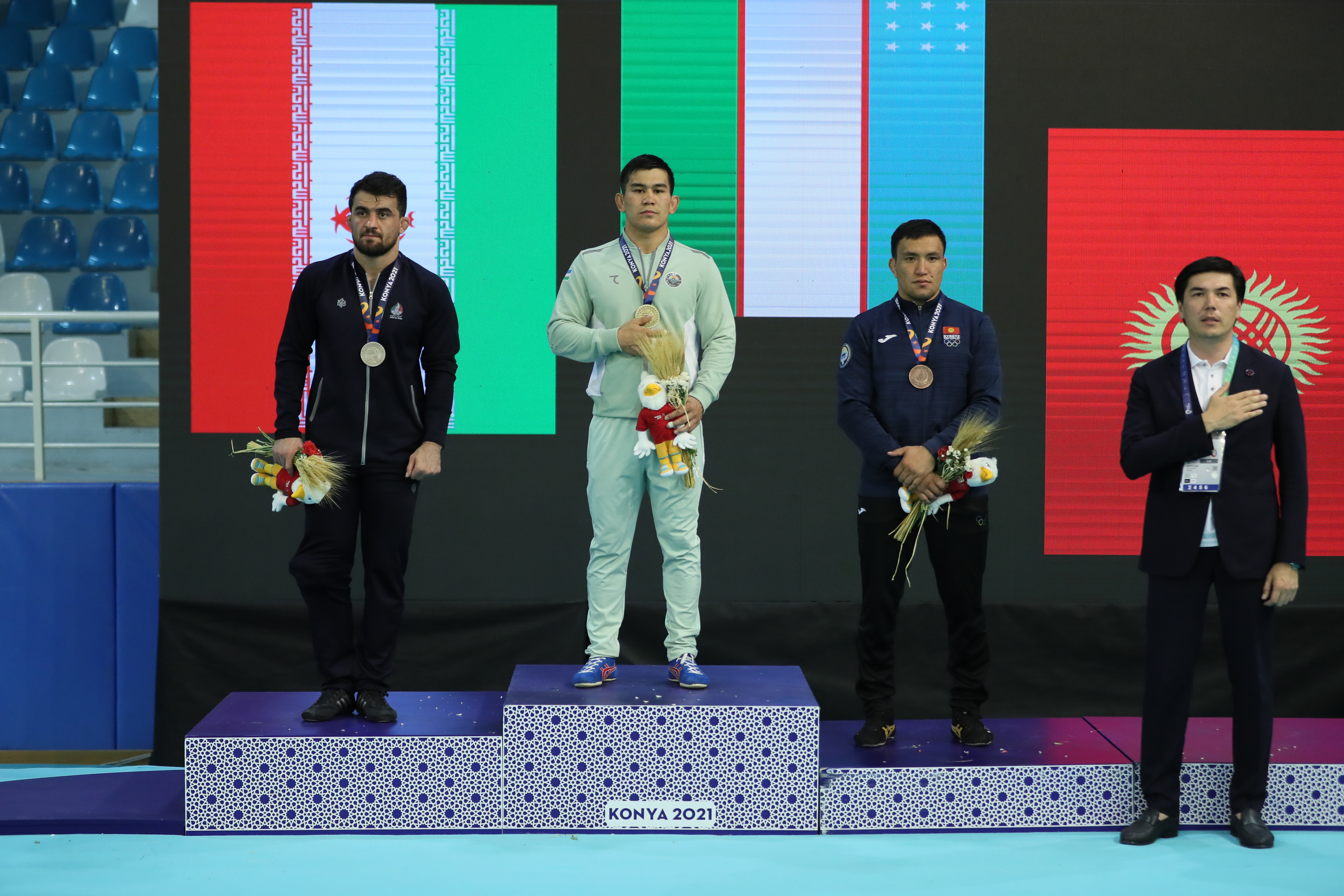
87 kg Medal ceremony

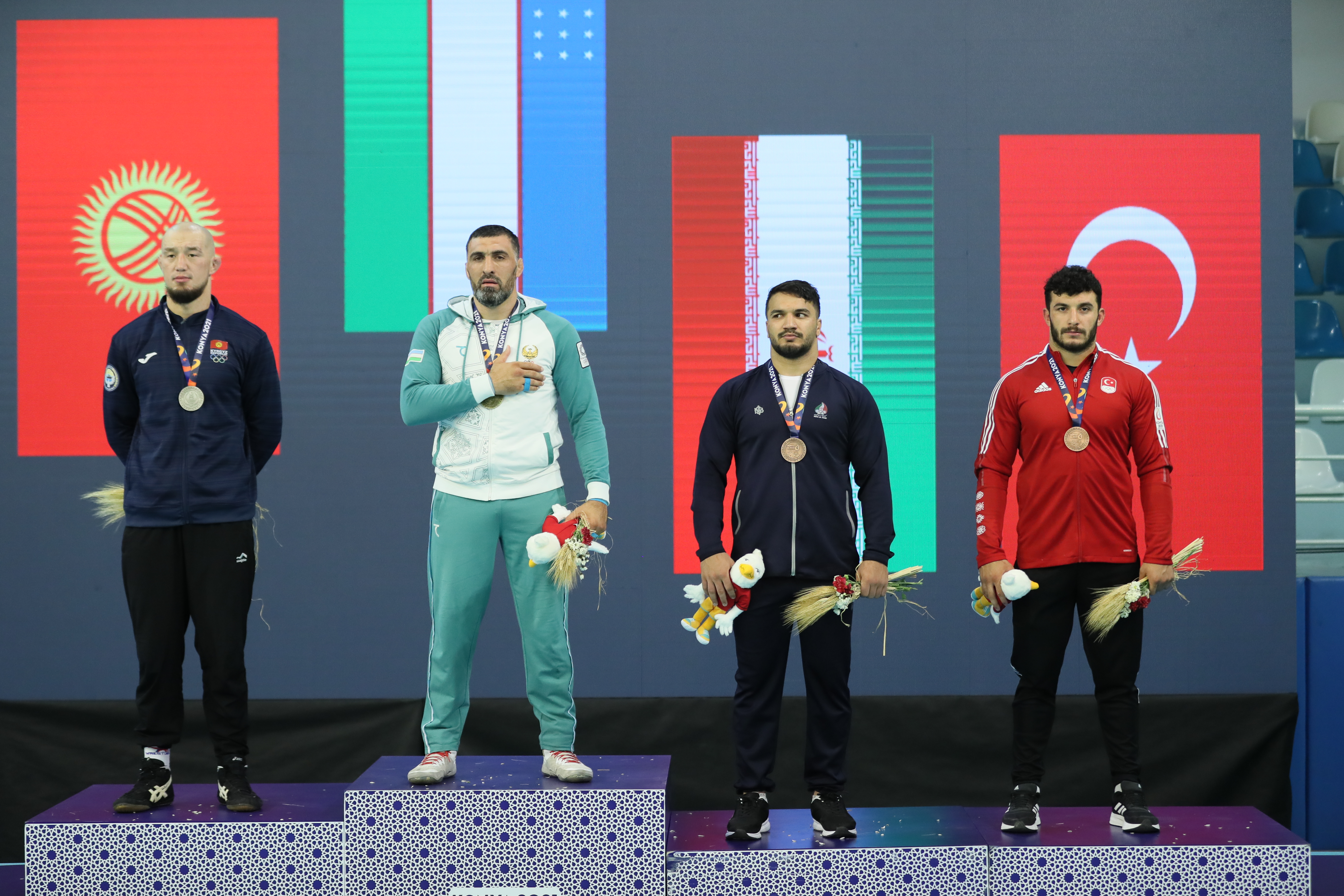
97 kg Medal Ceremony

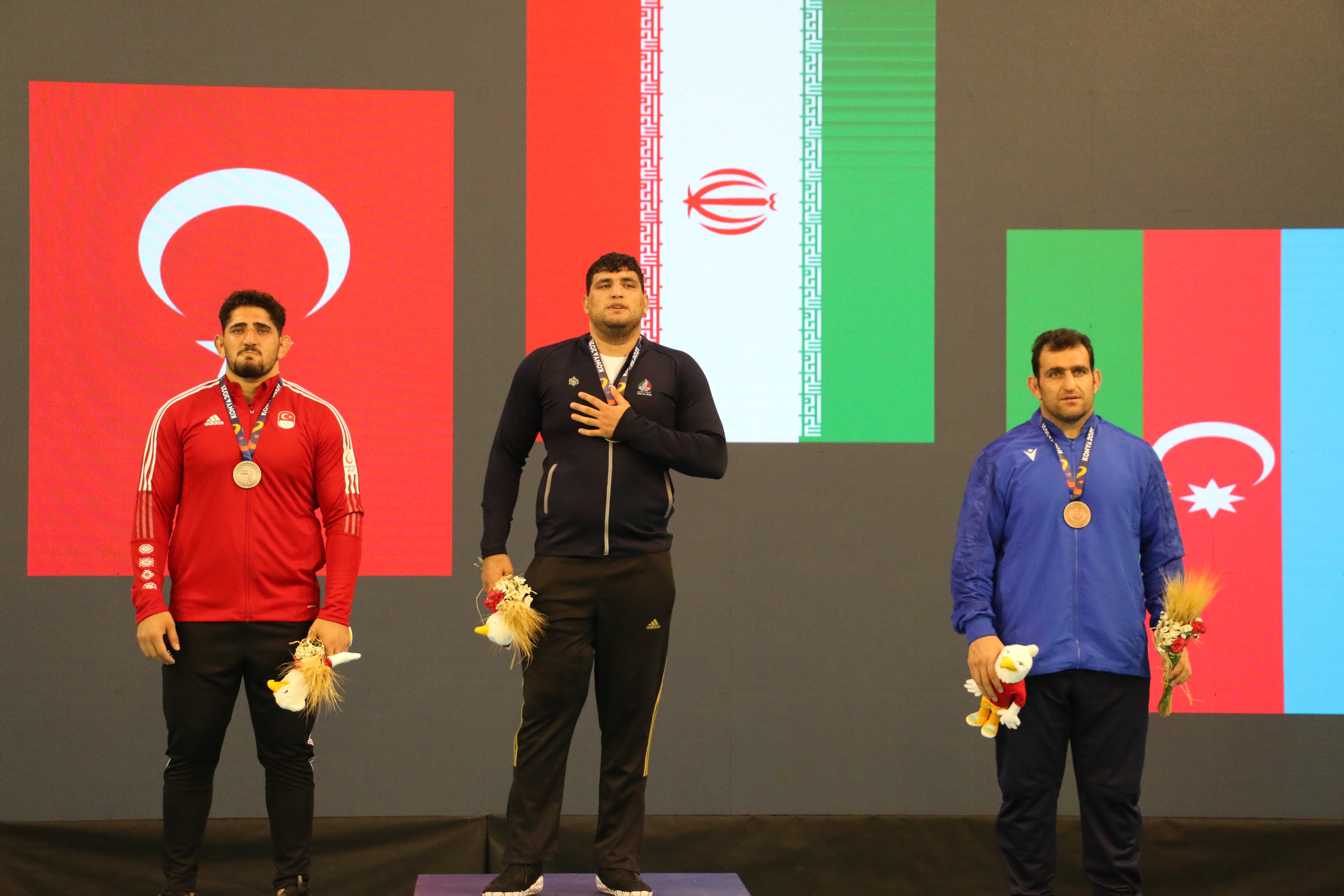
130 kg Medal ceremony

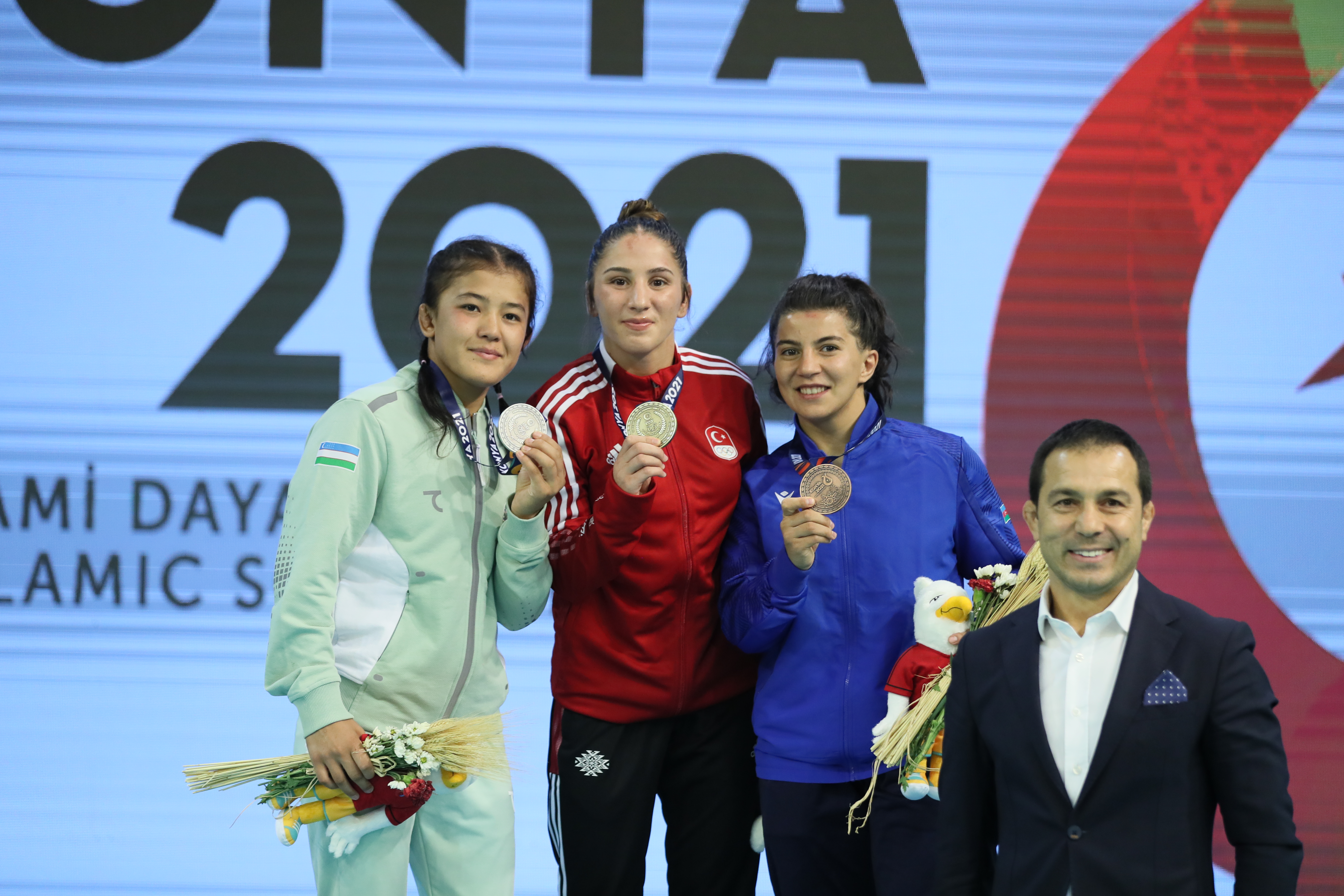
55 kg Medal ceremony

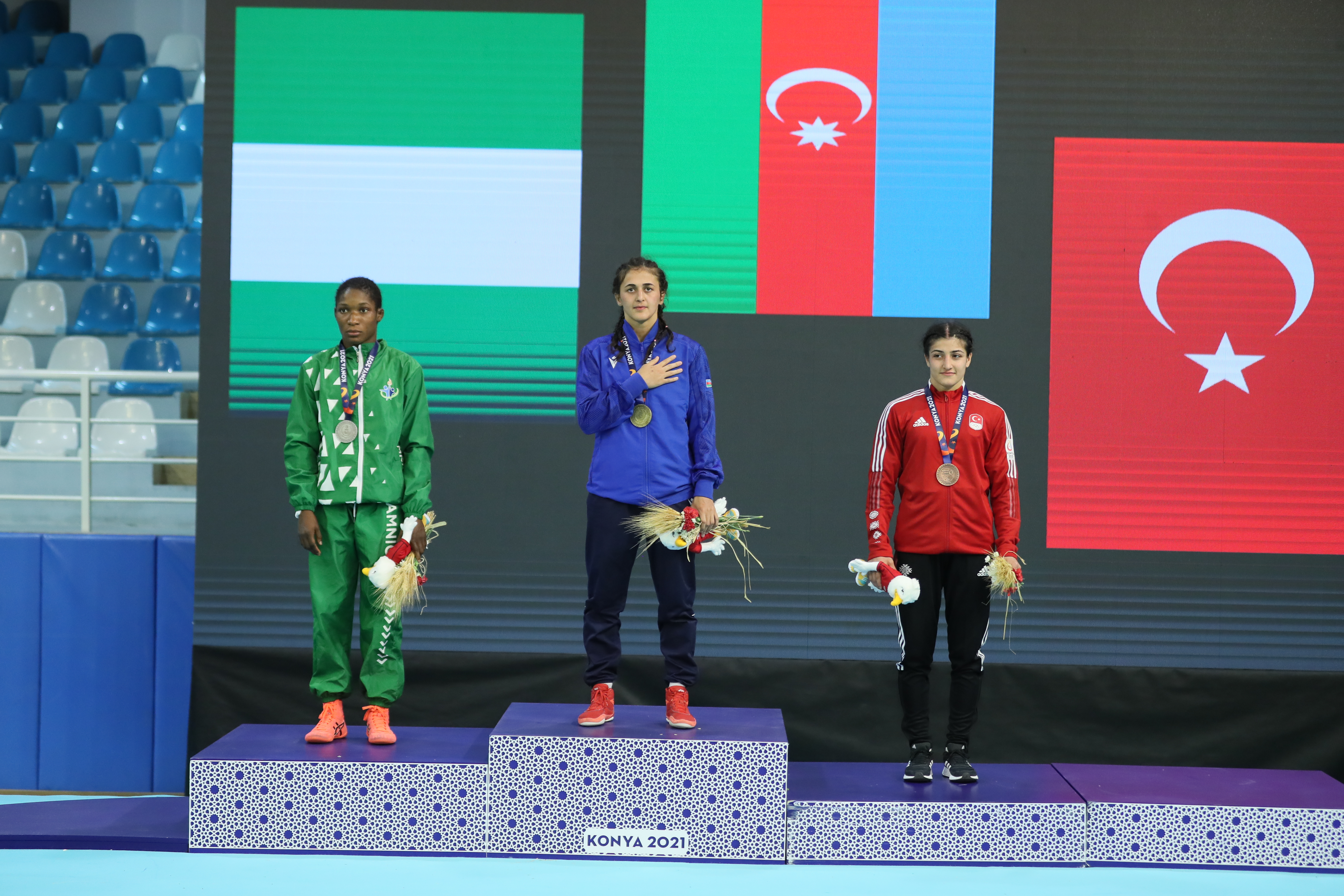
57 kg Medal ceremony

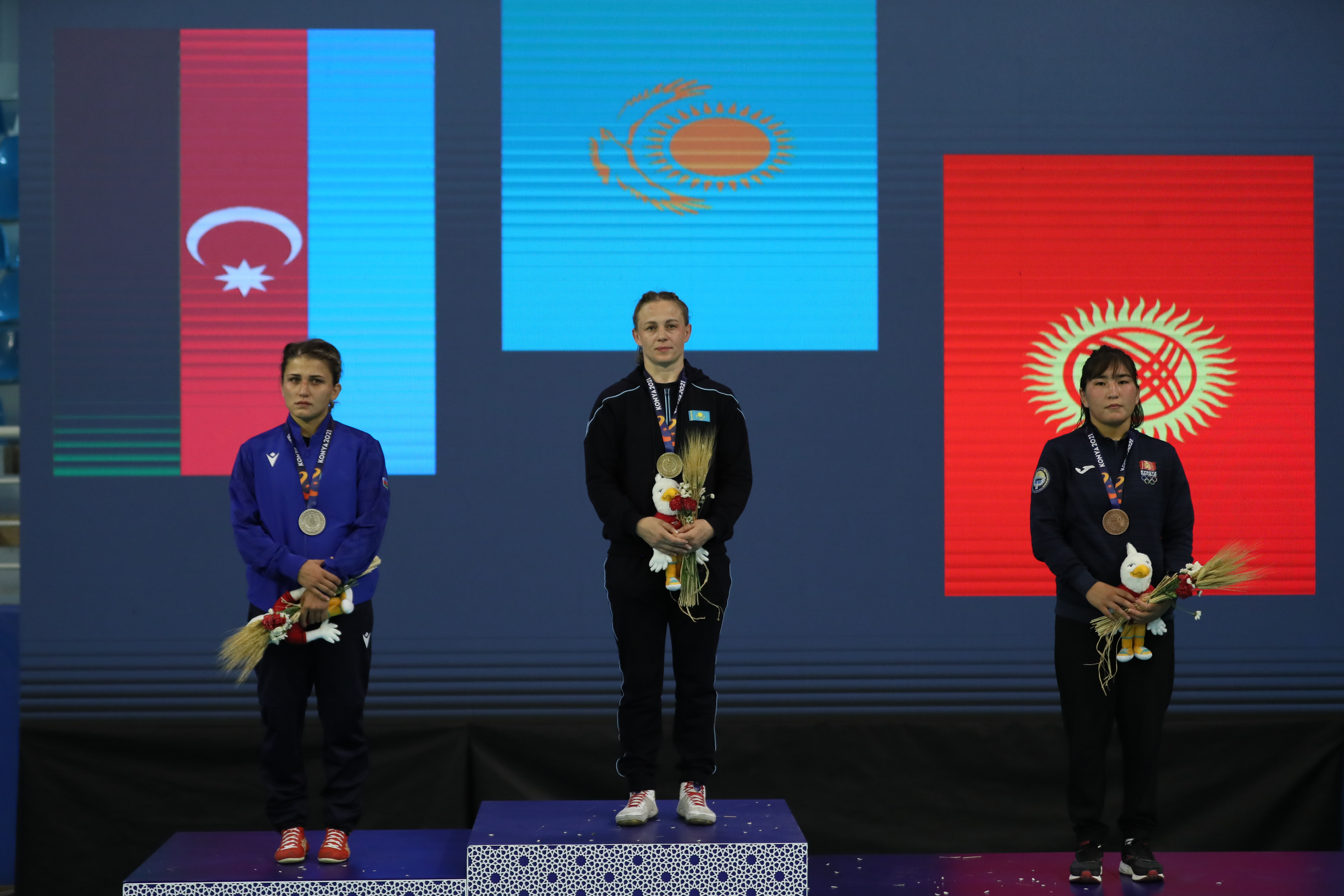
65 kg Medal ceremony

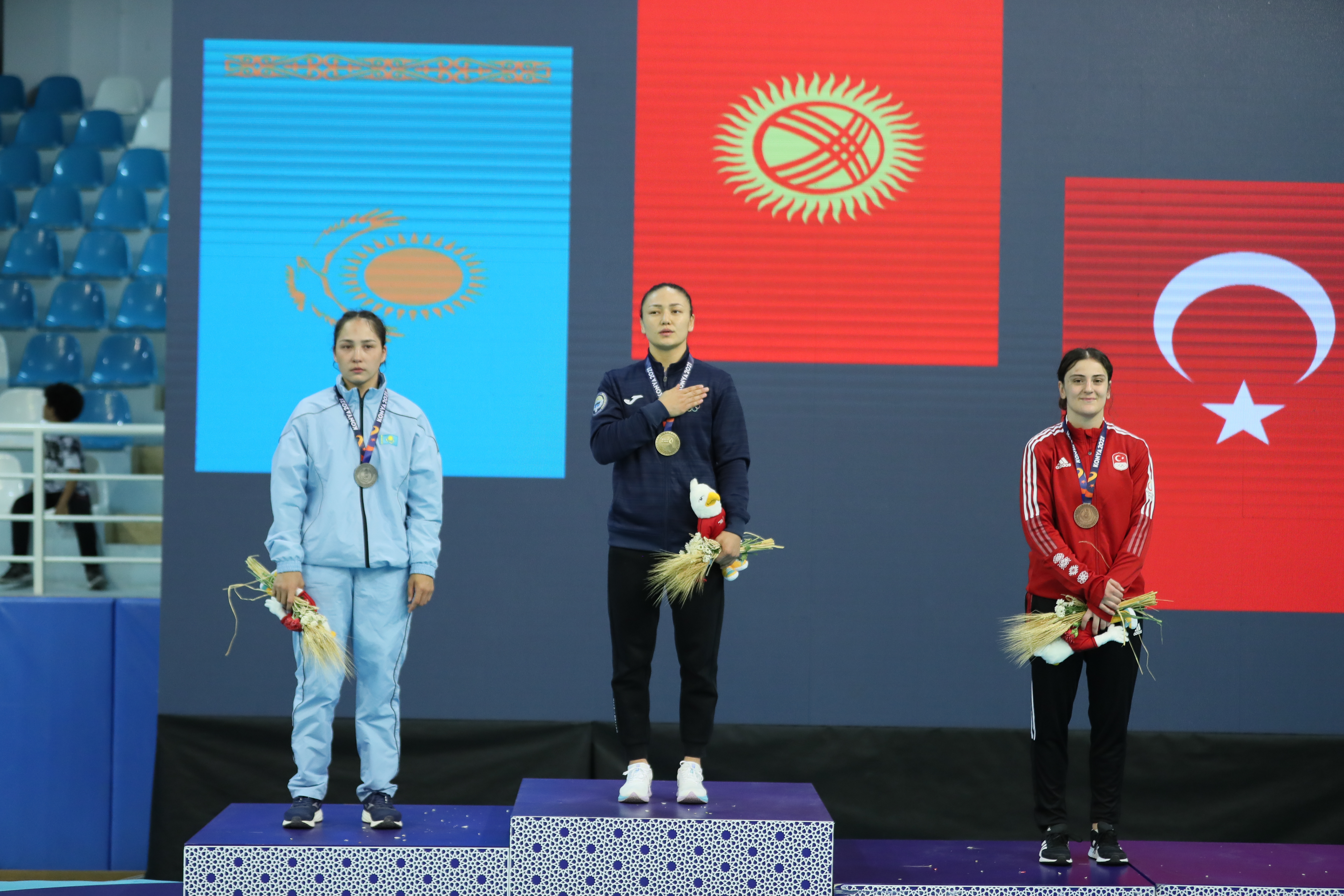
68 kg Medal ceremony

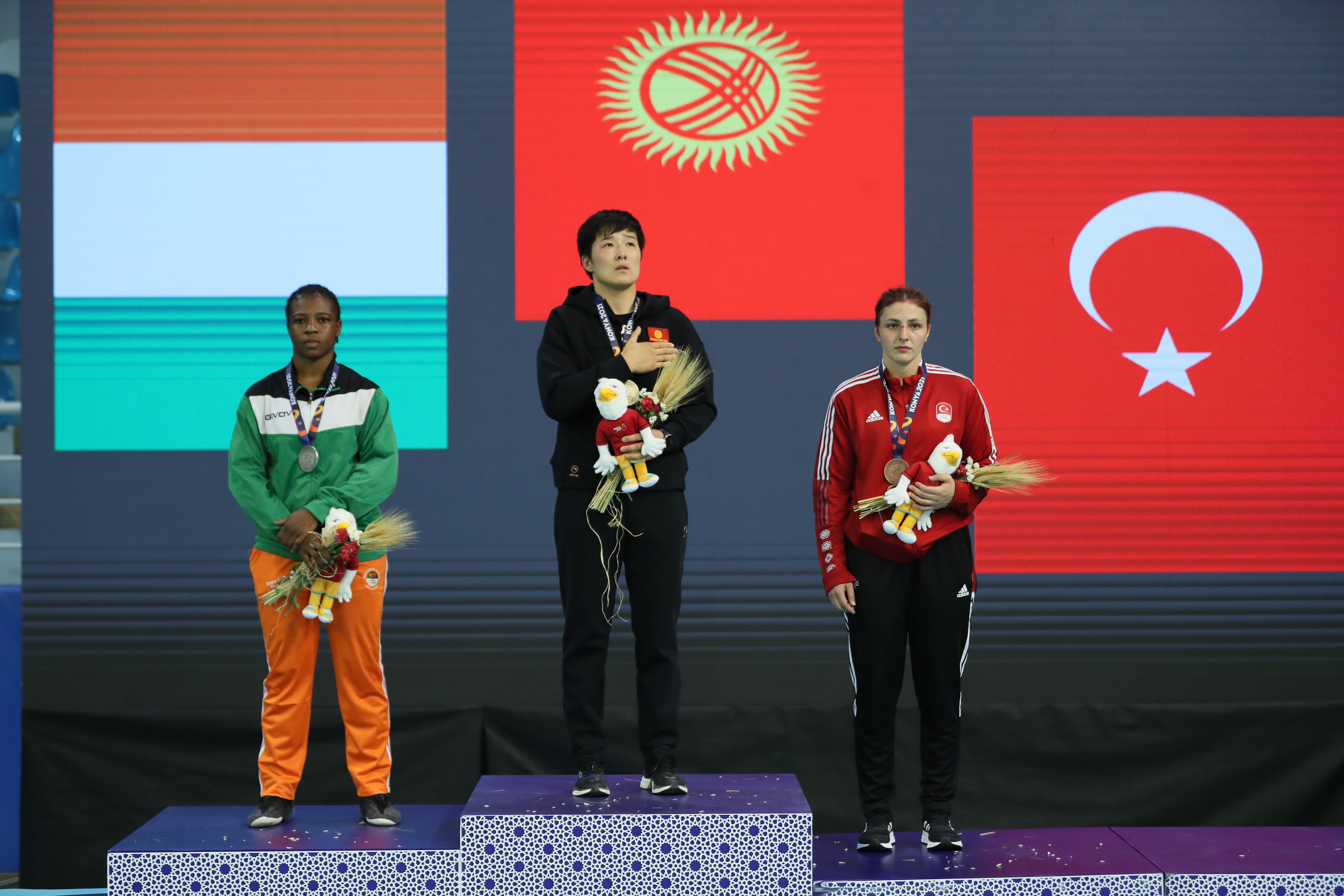
76 kg Medal ceremony

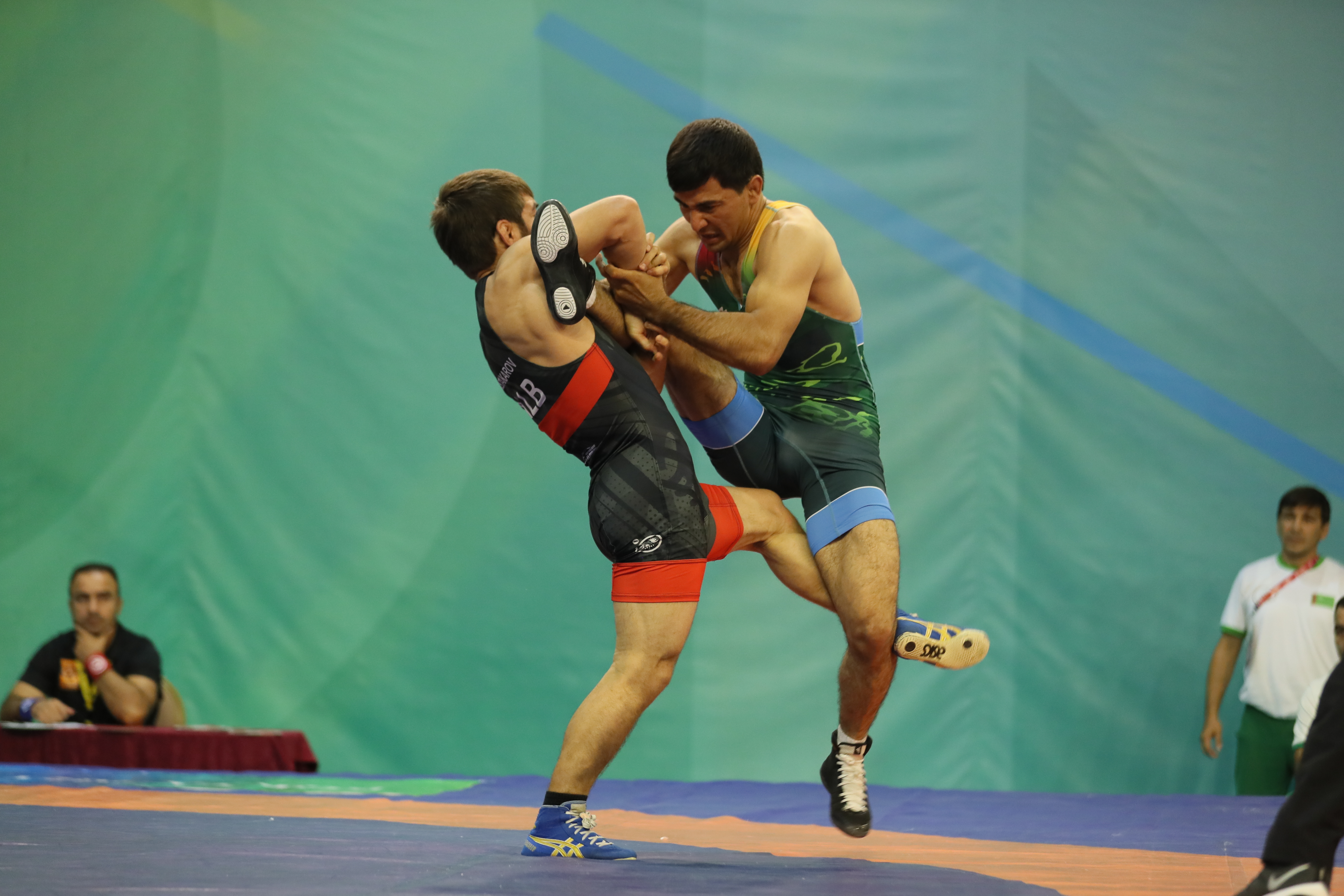
Men's freestyle 65 kg

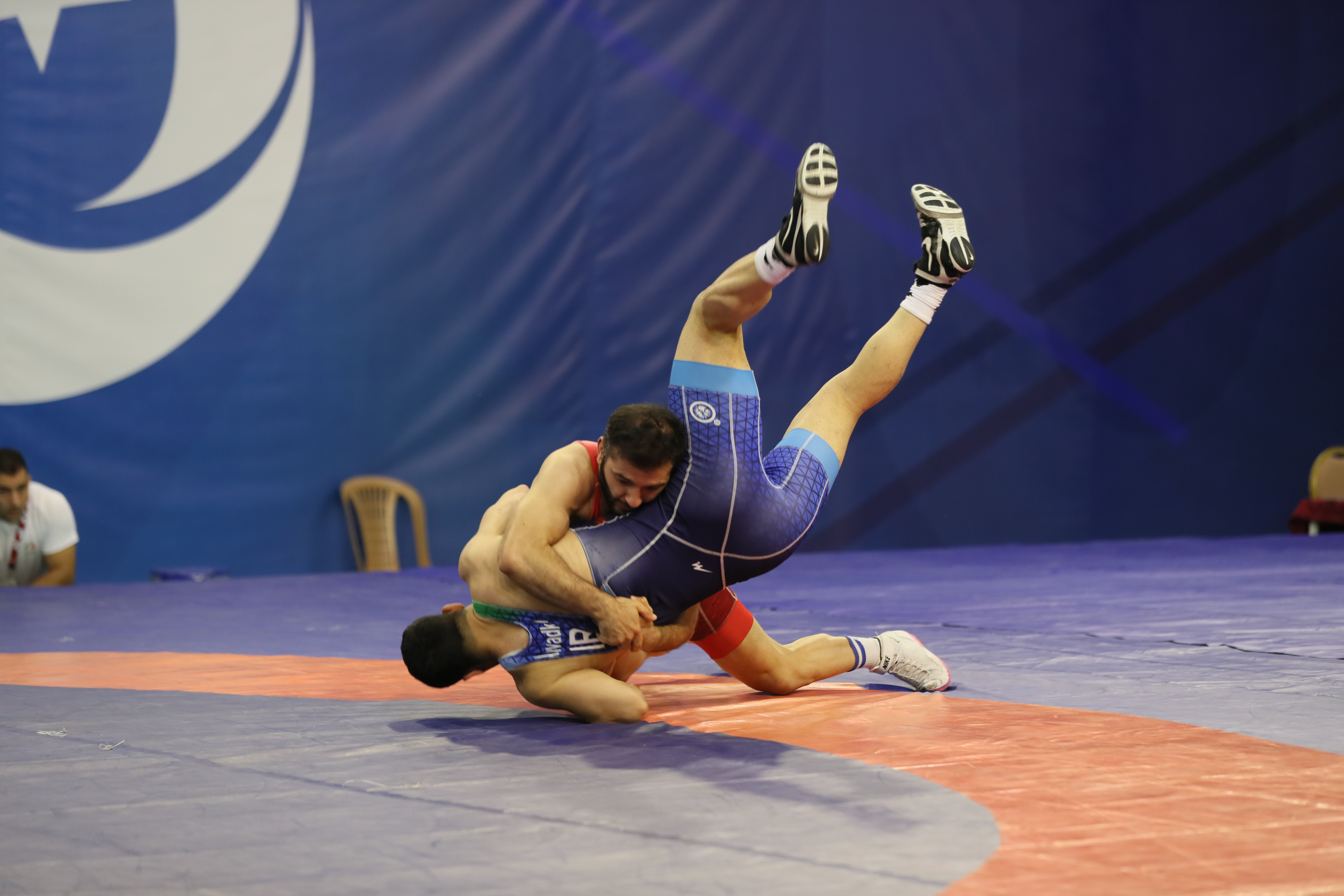
Men's freestyle 79 kg

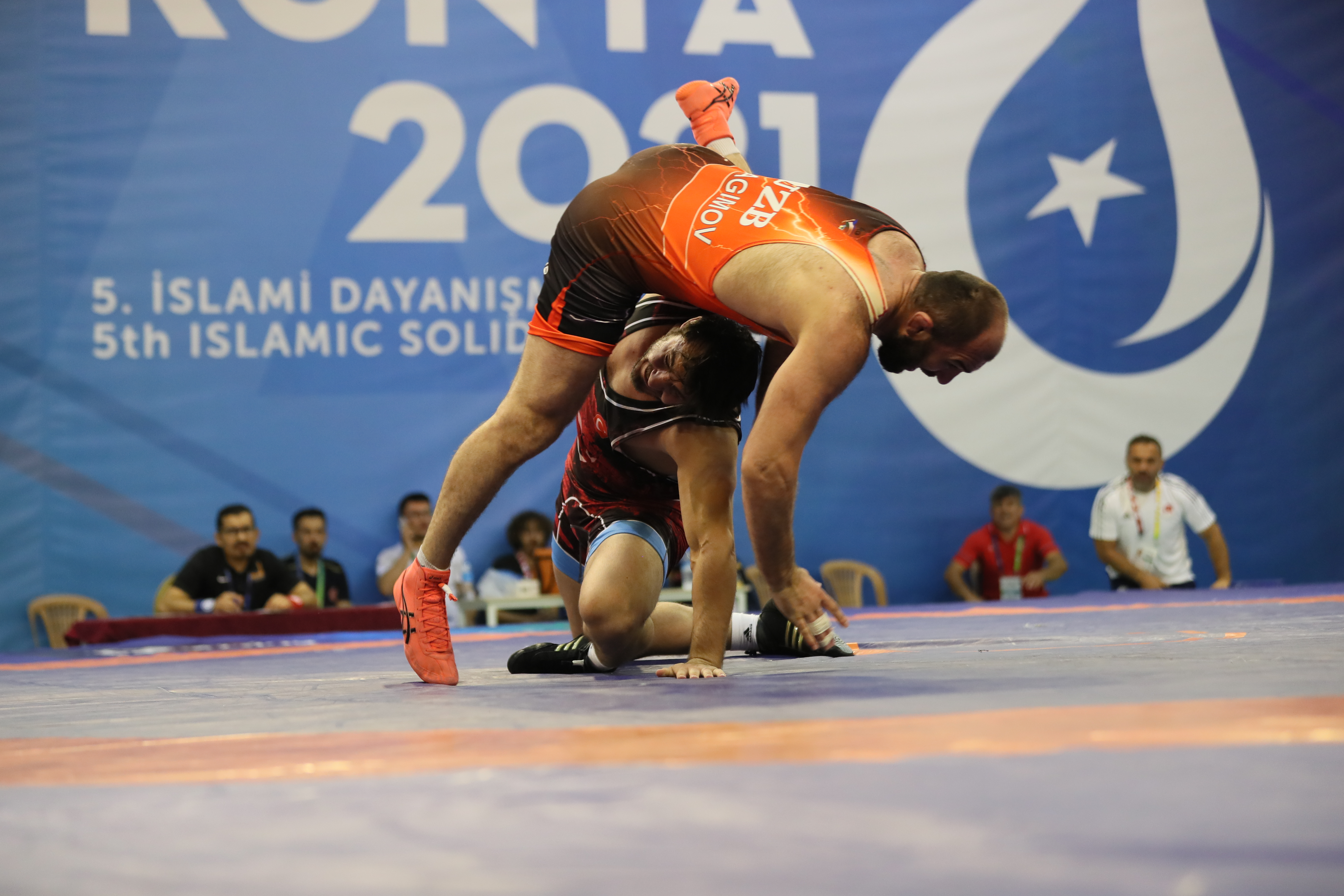
Men's freestyle 97 kg

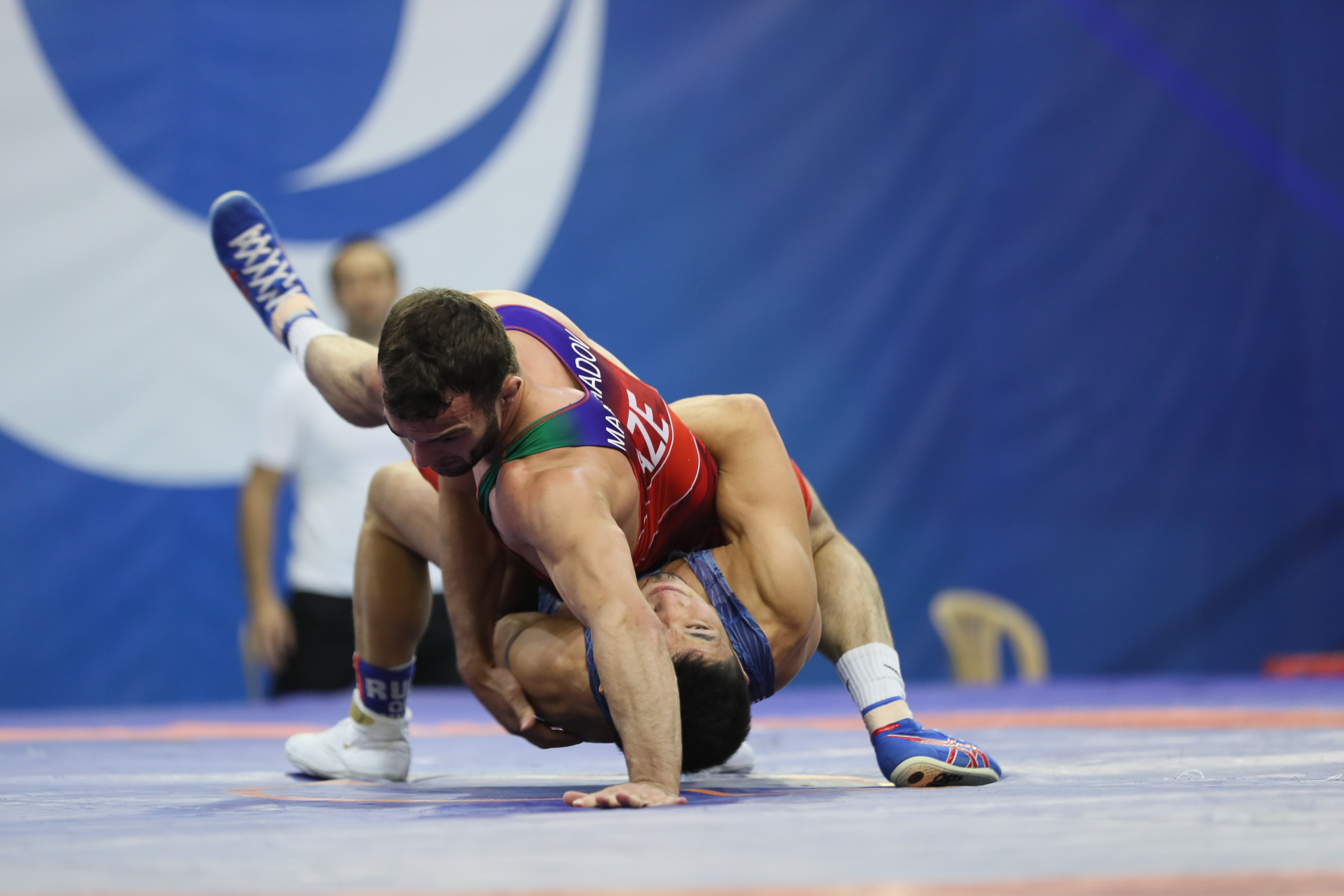
Men's Greco-Roman 60 kg

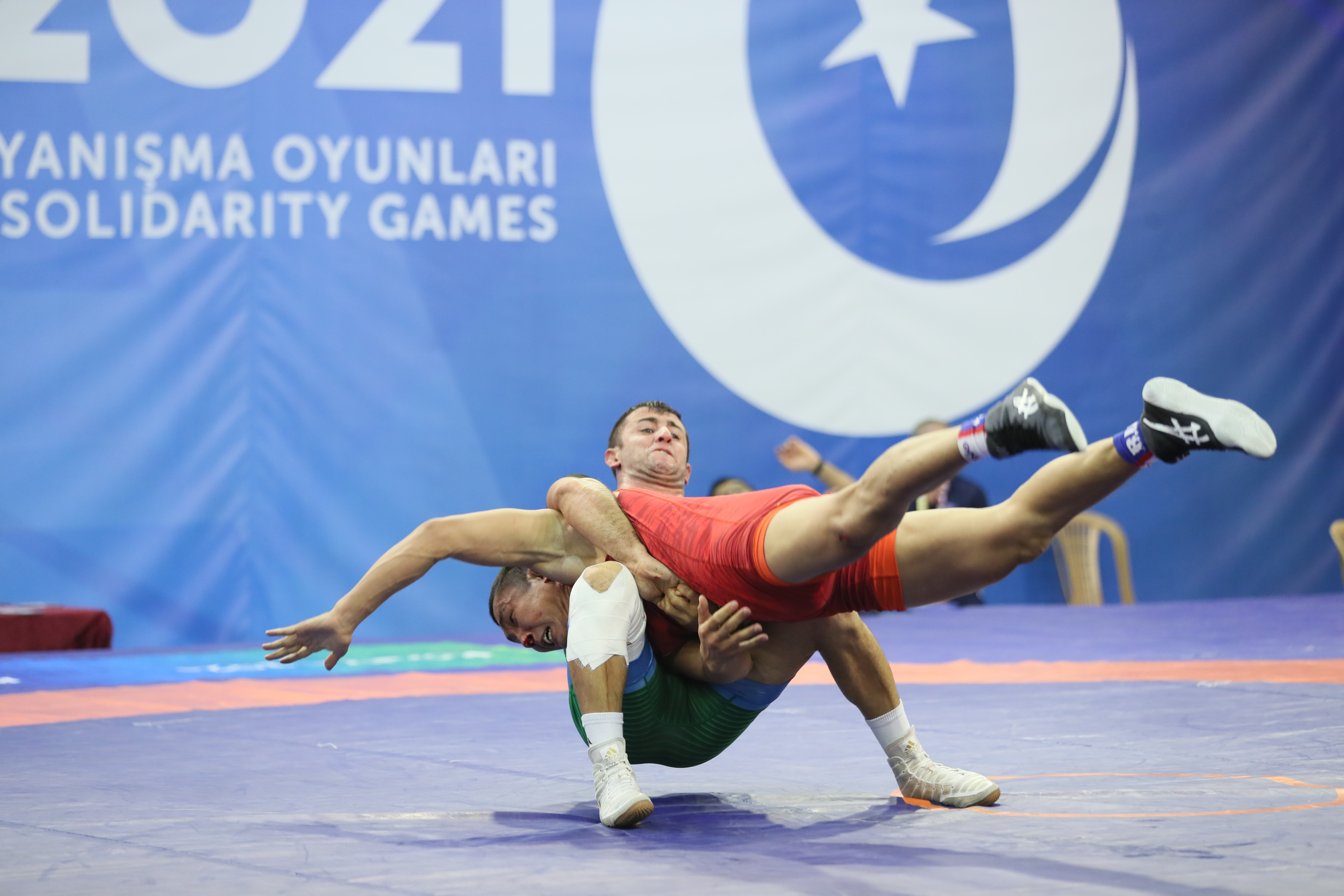
Men's Greco-Roman 82 kg

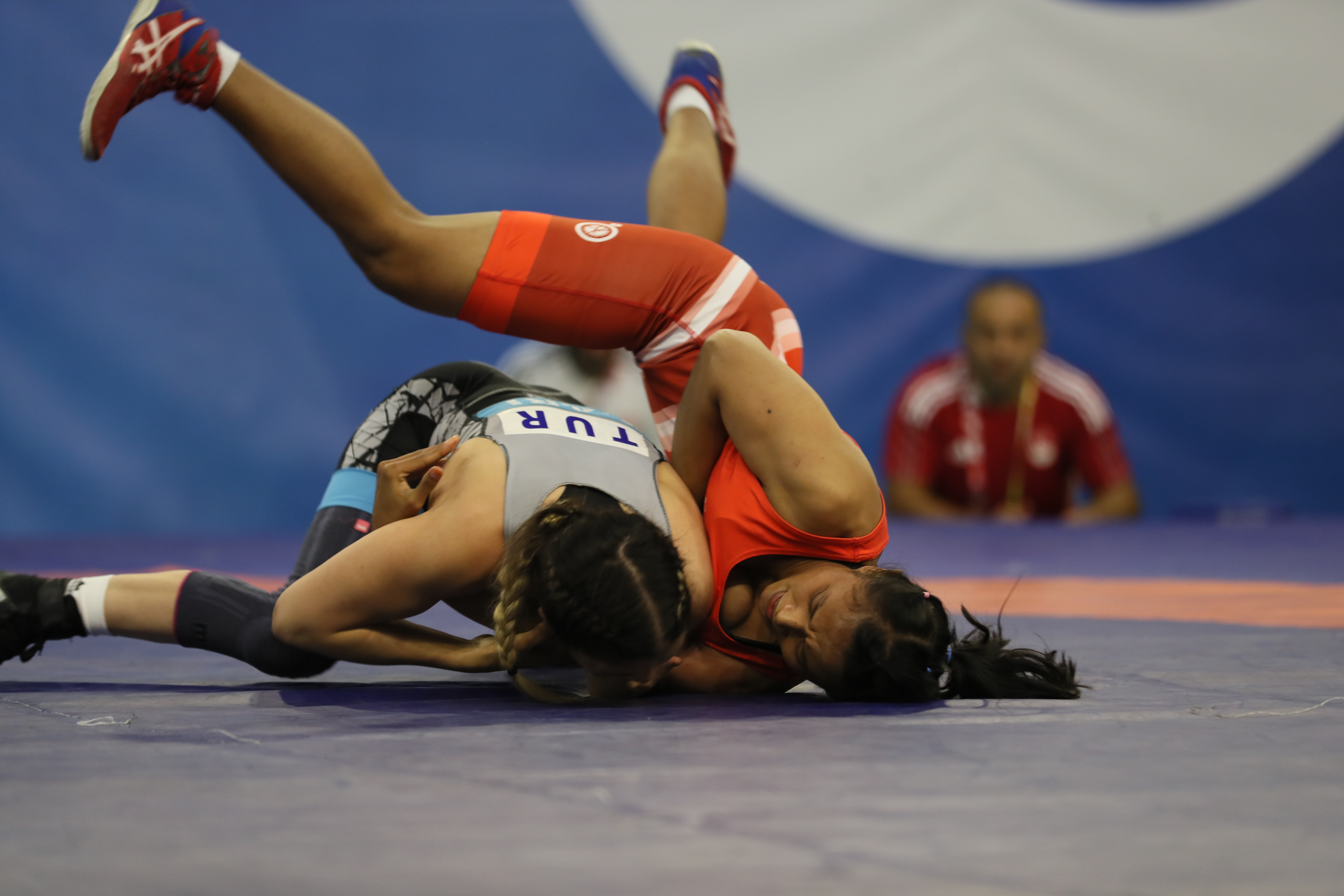
Women's freestyle 53 kg

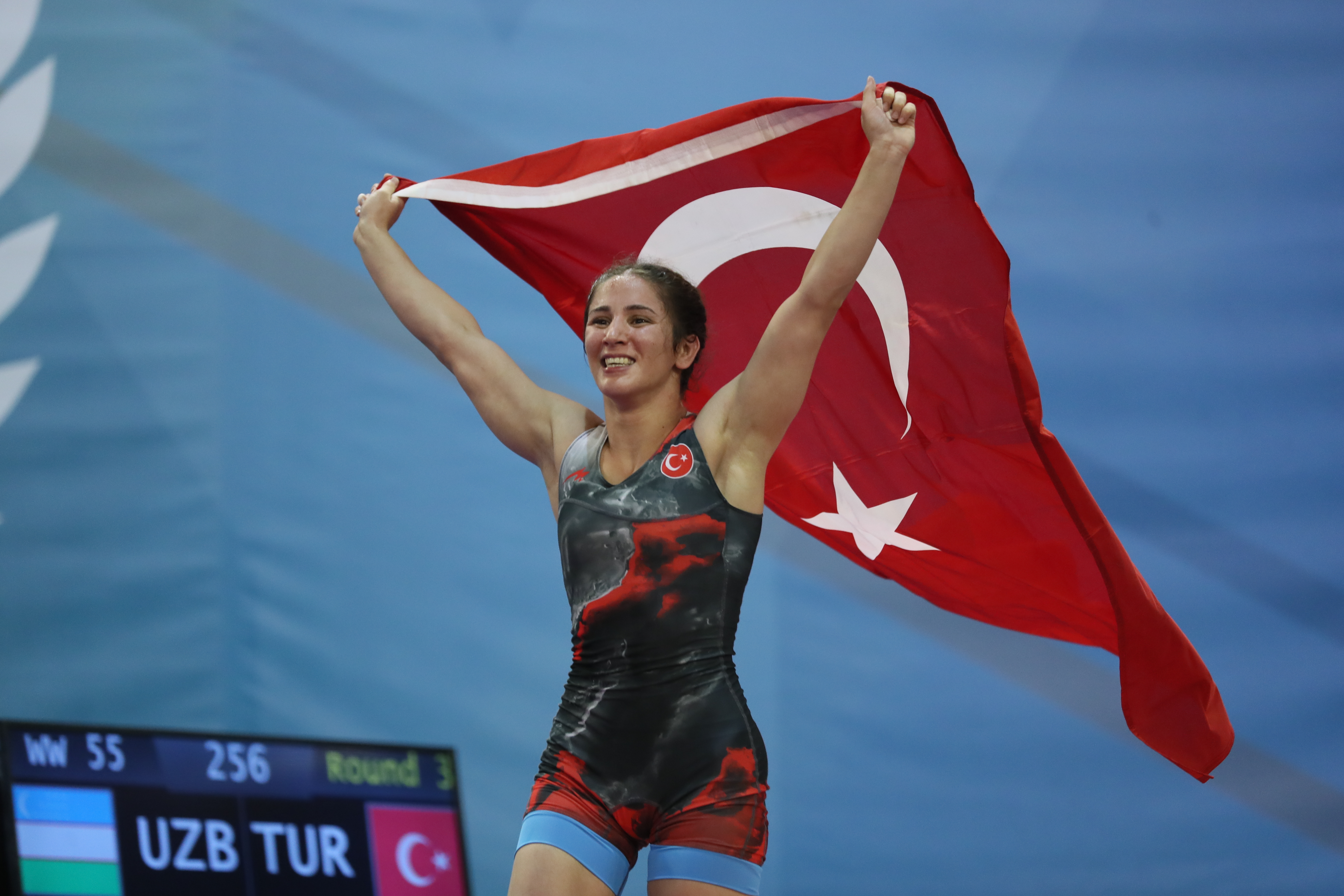
Zeynep Yetgil

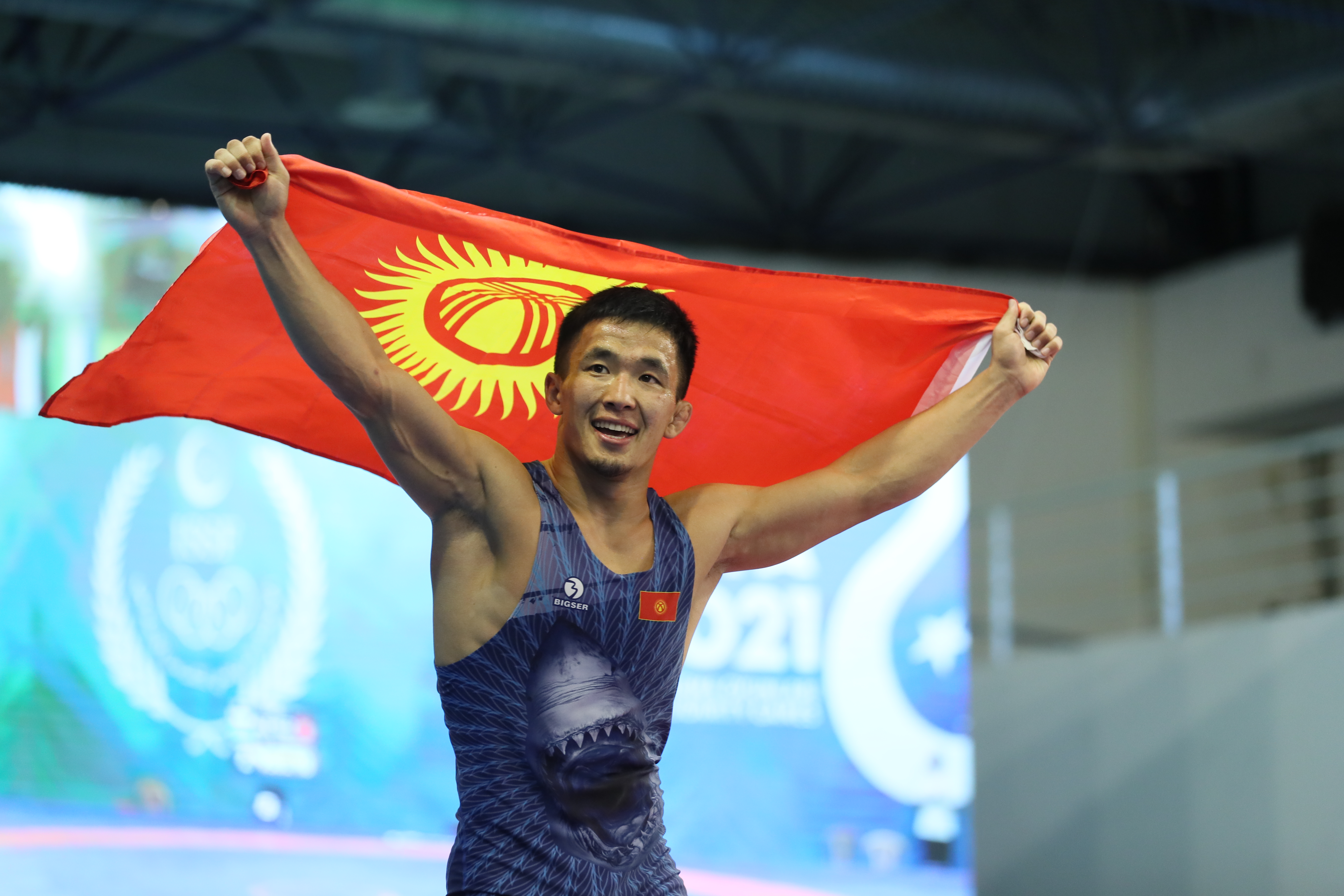
Zholaman Sharshenbekov

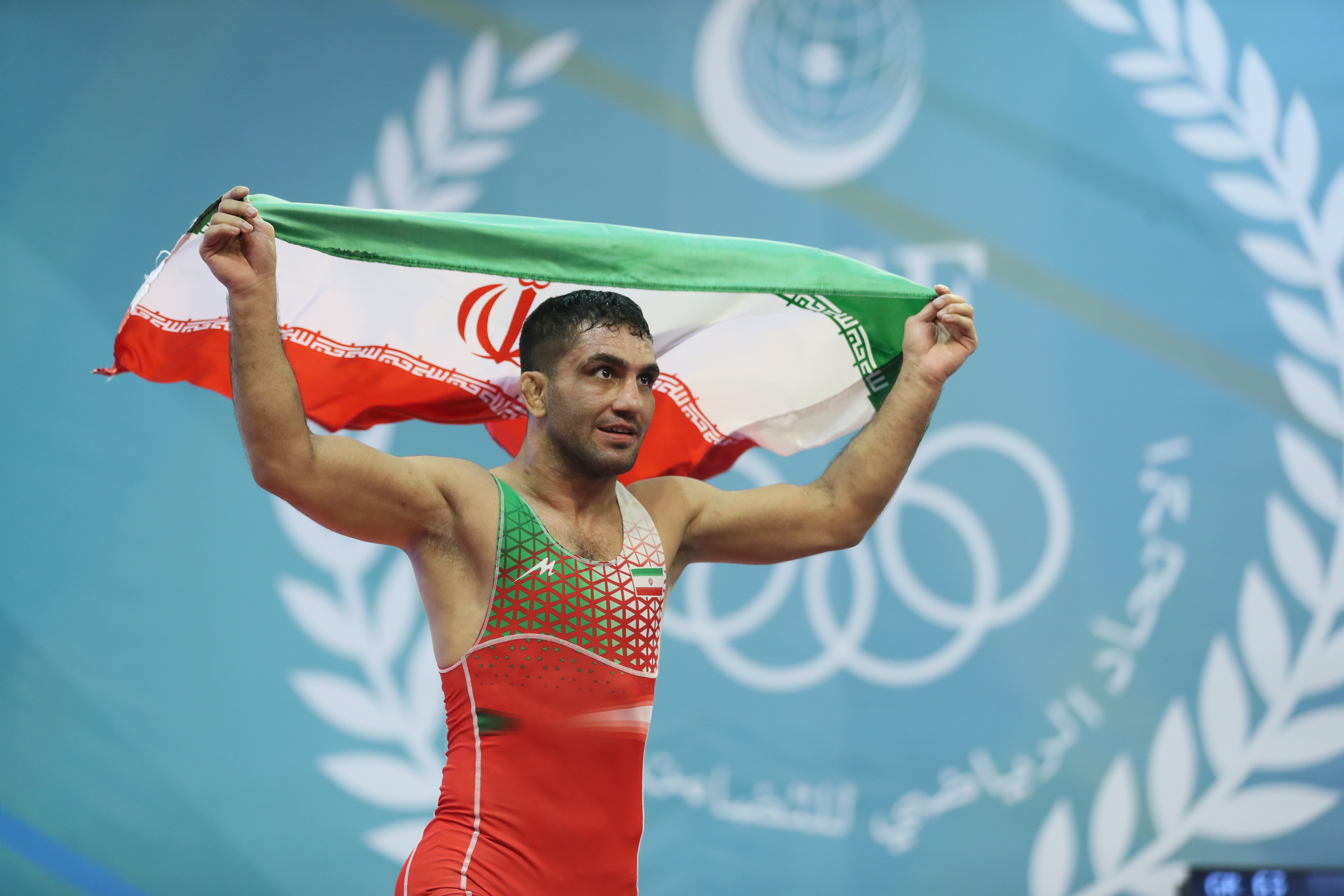
Shirzad Beheshti
