= 2022 European Wrestling Championships – Men's freestyle 86 kg =

Wrestling competition

Men's freestyle 86 kg at the 2022 European Wrestling Championships
- Venue: BOK Sports Hall
- Location: Budapest, Hungary
- Dates: 29-30 March
- Competitors: 15

Medalists
gold medal	Myles Amine	San Marino
silver medal	Abubakr Abakarov	Azerbaijan
bronze medal	Osman Göçen	Turkey
bronze medal	Sebastian Jezierzański	Poland

The men's freestyle 86 kg was a competition featured at the 2022 European Wrestling Championships, and was held in Budapest, Hungary on March 29 and 30.

== Results ==
Legend

- F — Won by fall
- WO — Won by walkover

=== Main Bracket ===
1/8 finals
Patrik Püspöki (HUN)	0
Uri Kalashnikov (ISR)	6
Domantas Pauliuščenko (LTU)	1
Akhmed Magamaev (BUL)	2^{F}
Syerus Eslami (GBR)	0
Osman Göçen (TUR)	10
Boris Makoev (SVK)	2
Tarzan Maisuradze (GEO)	5
Sebastian Jezierzański (POL)	WO
~~Ahmed Dudarov (GER)~~
Akhmed Aibuev (FRA)	1
Ivars Samušonoks (LAT)	4
Denis Balaur (MDA)	1
Abubakr Abakarov (AZE)	12

Quarterfinals
Myles Amine (SMR)	11
Uri Kalashnikov (ISR)	0
Akhmed Magamaev (BUL)	4
Osman Göçen (TUR)	5
Tarzan Maisuradze (GEO)	2
Sebastian Jezierzański (POL)	11
Ivars Samušonoks (LAT)	0
Abubakr Abakarov (AZE)	7

Semifinals
Myles Amine (SMR)	6
Osman Göçen (TUR)	6
Sebastian Jezierzański (POL)	1
Abubakr Abakarov (AZE)	3

Final
Myles Amine (SMR)	9
Abubakr Abakarov (AZE)	5

=== Repechage ===
Repechage round 1
Denis Balaur (MDA)	0
Ivars Samušonoks (LAT)	10

Bronze medal match
Uri Kalashnikov (ISR)	8
Osman Göçen (TUR)	8
Ivars Samušonoks (LAT)	0
Sebastian Jezierzański (POL)	6

== Final standing ==
Rank	Wrestler	UWW Points
1st place, gold medalist(s)	Myles Amine (SMR)	13000
2nd place, silver medalist(s)	Abubakr Abakarov (AZE)	11000
3rd place, bronze medalist(s)	Osman Göçen (TUR)	9500
3rd place, bronze medalist(s)	Sebastian Jezierzański (POL)	9500
5	Uri Kalashnikov (ISR)	8000
5	Ivars Samušonoks (LAT)	8000
7	Akhmed Magamaev (BUL)	7400
8	Tarzan Maisuradze (GEO)	7000
9	Boris Makoev (SVK)	6500
10	Akhmed Aibuev (FRA)	6100
11	Denis Balaur (MDA)	4000
12	Domantas Pauliuščenko (LTU)	3800
13	Patrik Püspöki (HUN)	3600
14	Syerus Eslami (GBR)	3400
15	Ahmed Dudarov (GER)	0
