= Osman Göçen =

Turkish freestyle wrestler

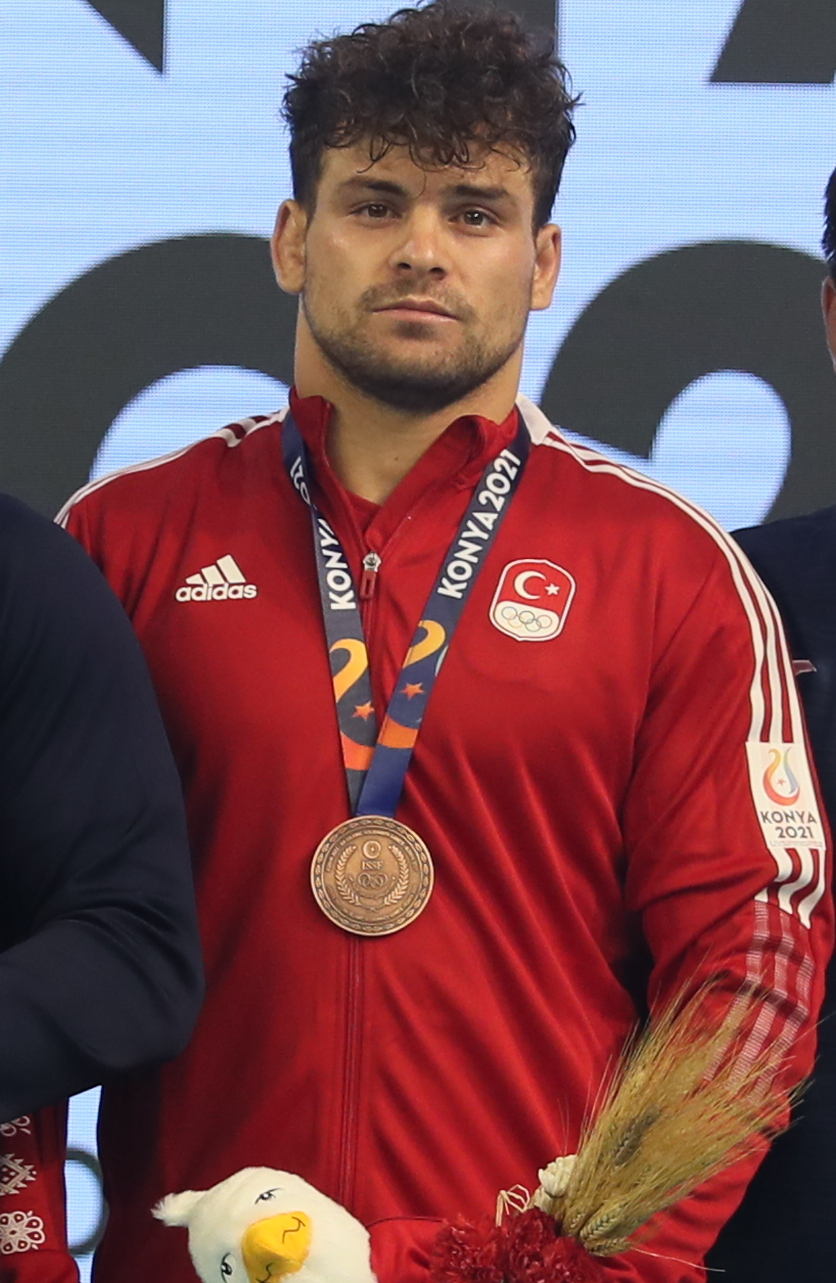
- Göçen at the 2021 Islamic Solidarity Games

Personal information
- Born: 5 January 1997 (age 29) Mersin, Turkey
- Height: 1.79 m (5 ft 10 in)
- Weight: 86 kg (190 lb; 13.5 st)

Sport
- Country: Turkey
- Sport: Amateur wrestling
- Weight class: 86 kg
- Event: Freestyle
- Club: Ankara ASKI SK
Medal record
Men's freestyle wrestling
Representing Turkey
European Championships
Bronze medal – third place	2022 Budapest	86 kg
Bronze medal – third place	2024 Bucharest	86 kg
Bronze medal – third place	2025 Bratislava	86 kg
Individual World Cup
Bronze medal – third place	2020 Belgrade	86 kg
Islamic Solidarity Games
Bronze medal – third place	2021 Konya	86 kg
Bronze medal – third place	2025 Riyadh	86 kg
Yasar Dogu Tournament
Gold medal – first place	2022 Istanbul	86 kg
Bronze medal – third place	2019 Istanbul	86 kg
Bronze medal – third place	2023 Istanbul	86 kg
Bronze medal – third place	2026 Antalya	86 kg
Dan Kolov & Nikola Petrov Tournament
Bronze medal – third place	2023 Sofia	86 kg
Bronze medal – third place	2026 Plovdiv	86 kg
Grand Prix
Gold medal – first place	2025 Ulaanbaatar	86 kg
Silver medal – second place	2022 Tunisia	86 kg
Bronze medal – third place	2023 Budapest	86 kg
Bronze medal – third place	2025 Budapest	86 kg
Bronze medal – third place	2025 Grozny	86 kg
World U23 Championships
Bronze medal – third place	2019 Budapest	86 kg
World Juniors Championships
Silver medal – second place	2016 Macon	84 kg
European Juniors Championships
Bronze medal – third place	2017 Dortmund	84 kg
World University Championships
Gold medal – first place	2018 Goiana	86 kg

Osman Göçen (born 5 January 1997) is a Turkish freestyle wrestler. He is a member of Ankara ASKI SK. He is a two-time bronze medalist at the European Wrestling Championships. He also won one of the bronze medals in his event at the 2021 Islamic Solidarity Games held in Konya, Turkey.

== Career ==
In 2019, Göçen won one of the bronze medals in the men's 86 kg event at the World U23 Wrestling Championship in Budapest, Hungary. In 2020, he also won one of the bronze medals in his event at the Individual Wrestling World Cup held in Belgrade, Serbia.

In March 2021, Göçen qualified at the European Qualification Tournament to compete at the 2020 Summer Olympics in Tokyo, Japan. He competed in the men's 86 kg event where he was eliminated in his second match.

In 2022, Göçen won the gold medal in his event at the Yasar Dogu Tournament held in Istanbul, Turkey. He also won one of the bronze medals in the men's 86 kg event at the 2022 European Wrestling Championships held in Budapest, Hungary. He also won one of the bronze medals in the men's 86 kg event at the 2021 Islamic Solidarity Games held in Konya, Turkey.

Göçen won one of the bronze medals in the men's 86 kg event at the 2024 European Wrestling Championships held in Bucharest, Romania. He defeated Vasyl Mykhailov of Ukraine in his bronze medal match. He competed at the 2024 European Wrestling Olympic Qualification Tournament in Baku, Azerbaijan hoping to qualify for the 2024 Summer Olympics in Paris, France. He was eliminated in his first match and he did not qualify for the Olympics. Göçen also competed at the 2024 World Wrestling Olympic Qualification Tournament held in Istanbul, Turkey without qualifying for the Olympics.

== Achievements ==
Year	Tournament	Location	Result	Event
2020	Individual World Cup	Budapest, Hungary	3rd	Freestyle 86 kg
2022	European Championships	Budapest, Hungary	3rd	Freestyle 86 kg
2022	Islamic Solidarity Games	Konya, Turkey	3rd	Freestyle 86 kg
2024	European Championships	Bucharest, Romania	3rd	Freestyle 86 kg
2025	European Championships	Bratislava, Slovakia	3rd	Freestyle 86 kg
