= Abubakr Abakarov =

Azerbaijani freestyle wrestler

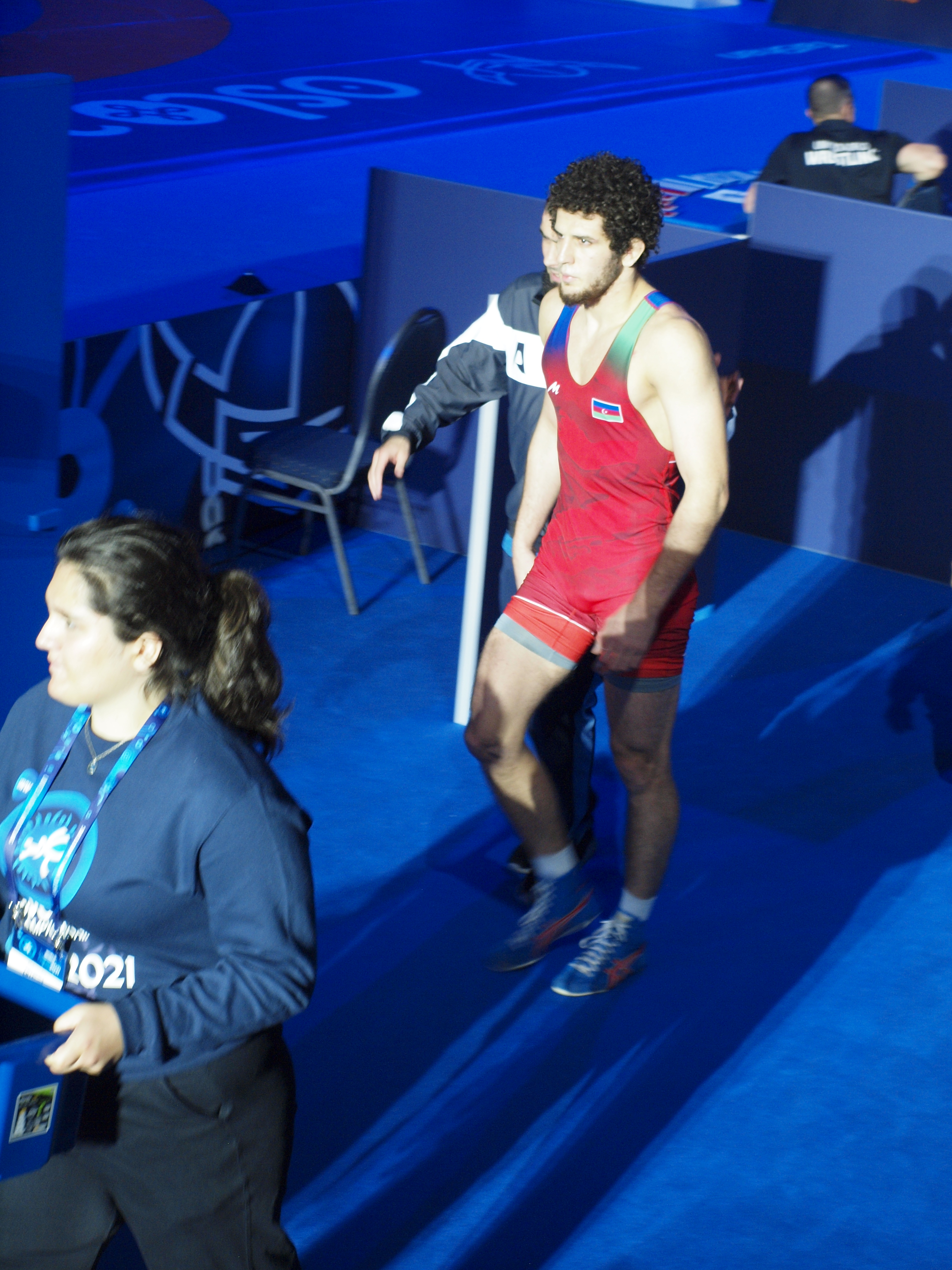
- 2021 World Wrestling Championships

Personal information
- Native name: Абубакр Исламбекович Абакаров
- Full name: Abubakr Islambekovich Abakarov
- National team: Azerbaijan
- Born: 28 January 1999 (age 27) Khasavyurt, Dagestan, Russia
- Height: 185 cm (6 ft 1 in)

Sport
- Country: Azerbaijan
- Sport: Amateur wrestling
- Weight class: 86 kg
- Event: Freestyle
Medal record
Men's freestyle wrestling
Representing Azerbaijan
World Championships
Bronze medal – third place	2021 Oslo	86 kg
European Championships
Silver medal – second place	2022 Budapest	86 kg
Bronze medal – third place	2023 Zagreb	86 kg
Islamic Solidarity Games
Silver medal – second place	2021 Konya	86 kg
Yasar Dogu Tournament
Gold medal – first place	2020 Istanbul	79 kg
Dan Kolov & Nikola Petrov Tournament
Gold medal – first place	2022 Veliko Tarnovo	86 kg
Grand Prix
Gold medal – first place	2022 Rome	86 kg
Gold medal – first place	2024 Warsaw	92 kg
Silver medal – second place	2019 Yakutsk	79 kg
Silver medal – second place	2023 Bishkek	86 kg
Bronze medal – third place	2021 Nice	86 kg
Bronze medal – third place	2025 Zagreb	92 kg
Bronze medal – third place	2025 Budapest	92 kg
World U23 Championships
Silver medal – second place	2019 Budapest	79 kg
European U23 Championships
Gold medal – first place	2022 Plovdiv	86 kg
World Junior Championships
Silver medal – second place	2018 Trnava	74 kg
Bronze medal – third place	2019 Tallinn	79 kg
European Juniors Championships
Gold medal – first place	2019 Pontevedra	79 kg
World Cadets Championships
Gold medal – first place	2016 Tbilisi	69 kg

Abubakr Abakarov (born 28 January 1999) is a Russian-Azerbaijani freestyle wrestler.

== Wrestling career ==
He won one of the bronze medals in the men's 86 kg event at the 2021 World Wrestling Championships held in Oslo, Norway.

In 2019, he won the silver medal in the men's 79 kg event at the World U23 Wrestling Championship in Budapest, Hungary.

He won the gold medal in his event at the 2022 European U23 Wrestling Championship held in Plovdiv, Bulgaria. A few months later, he won the gold medal in his event at the Matteo Pellicone Ranking Series 2022 held in Rome, Italy. He competed in the 86 kg event at the 2022 World Wrestling Championships held in Belgrade, Serbia.
