= Taimuraz Friev =

Spanish freestyle wrestler

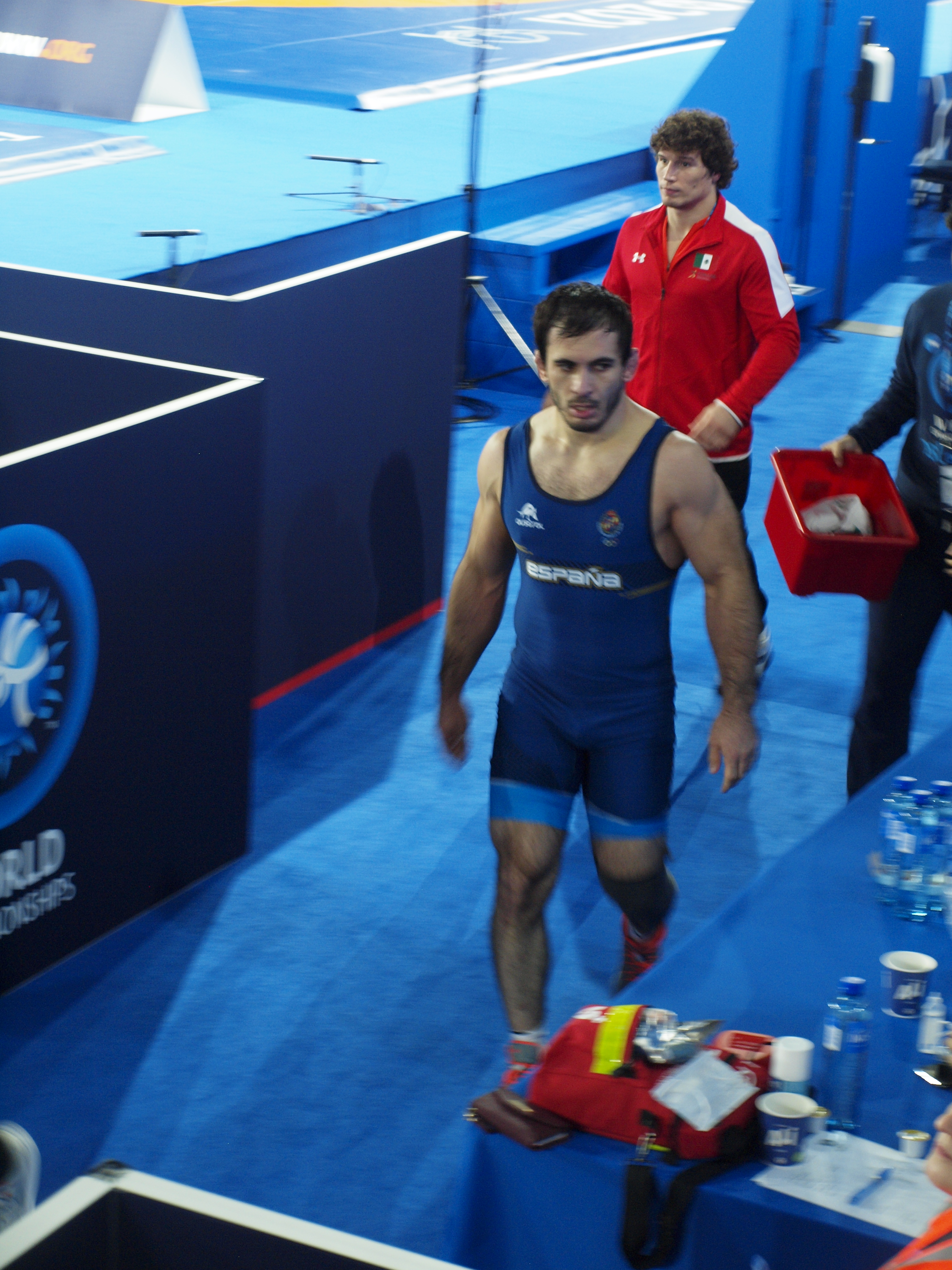

Personal information
- Native name: Фрив Наскидева Таймураз
- Nationality: Spain
- Born: Friev Naskideava Taimuraz; September 15, 1986 (age 39) Vladikavkaz, Russia
- Height: 176 cm (5 ft 9 in)
- Weight: 86 kg (190 lb)

Sport
- Country: Russia; Spain (since 2014)
- Sport: Freestyle wrestling
- Weight class: 86 kg
- Club: Sportclub Lamina
- Coached by: Totras Orchegov, Marik Tedeev
Medal record
Men's freestyle wrestling
Representing Spain
World Championships
Bronze medal – third place	2018 Budapest	86 kg
Representing Russia
Russian Championships
Bronze medal – third place	2009 Kazan	74 kg
Bronze medal – third place	2008 St.Petersburg	74 kg
Junior European Championships
Bronze medal – third place	2005 Wroclaw	74 kg

Taimuraz Ruslanovich Friev (Russian: Таймураз Русланович Фриев; born September 15, 1986, in Vladikavkaz) is a Russian freestyle wrestler of Ossetian descent representing Spain. He competed in the men's freestyle 74 kg event at the 2016 Summer Olympics, where he was eliminated in the Round of 32 by Liván López .

He competed in the 86 kg event at the 2022 World Wrestling Championships held in Belgrade, Serbia. He competed at the 2024 European Wrestling Olympic Qualification Tournament in Baku, Azerbaijan hoping to qualify for the 2024 Summer Olympics in Paris, France. He was eliminated in his second match and he did not qualify for the Olympics.
